= 1969 Cannes Film Festival =

- Official poster of the 22nd Cannes Film Festival
- Opening film: Sweet Charity
- Location: Cannes, France
- Founded: 1946
- Awards: Grand Prix du Festival International du Film: If....
- No. of films: 26 (In Competition)
- Festival date: 8 May 1969 – 23 May 1969
- Website: festival-cannes.com/en

Cannes Film Festival
- 1970 1968

The 22nd Cannes Film Festival took place from 8 to 23 May 1969. Italian filmmaker Luchino Visconti served as jury president for the main competition.

The Grand Prix du Festival International du Film, then the festival's main prize, was awarded to If.... by Lindsay Anderson.

At this edition a new non-competitive section called Directors' Fortnight was created, in response to the cancellation of the 1968 festival.

The festival opened with Sweet Charity by Bob Fosse.

== Jury ==
=== Main Competition ===
- Luchino Visconti, Italian filmmaker - Jury President
- Chinghiz Aitmatov, Soviet author
- Marie Bell, French actress and stage director
- Jaroslav Boček, Czechoslovak
- Veljko Bulajić, Yugoslav filmmaker
- Stanley Donen, American filmmaker and choreographer
- Jerzy Glucksman, Swedish student
- Robert Kanters, French film critic
- Sam Spiegel, American producer

=== Short Films Competition ===
- Charles Duvanel, Swiss
- Mihnea Gheorghiu, Romanian
- Claude Soulé, French CST official

== Official selection ==
=== In Competition ===
The following feature films competed for the Grand Prix du Festival International du Film:

| English title | Original title | Director(s) | Production country |
|---|---|---|---|
| Ådalen 31 | | Bo Widerberg | Sweden |
| All My Good Countrymen | Všichni dobří rodáci | Vojtěch Jasný | Czechoslovakia |
| Antonio das Mortes | O Dragão da Maldade contra o Santo Guerreiro | Glauber Rocha | Brazil |
| The Appointment | | Sidney Lumet | United States |
| Calcutta | | Louis Malle | France |
| Dillinger Is Dead | Dillinger è morto | Marco Ferreri | Italy |
| Don't Let the Angels Fall | | George Kaczender | Canada |
| Easy Rider | | Dennis Hopper | United States |
| End of a Priest | Farářův konec | Evald Schorm | Czechoslovakia |
| Flashback | | Raffaele Andreassi | Italy |
| The Great Love | Le Grand Amour | Pierre Étaix | France |
| Hunting Flies | Polowanie na muchy | Andrzej Wajda | Poland |
| Hymn to a Tired Man | 日本の青春 | Masaki Kobayashi | Japan |
| If.... | | Lindsay Anderson | United Kingdom |
| Isadora | | Karel Reisz | United Kingdom, France |
| It Rains in My Village | Biće skoro propast sveta | Aleksandar Petrović | Yugoslavia |
| Love Circle | Metti, una sera a cena | Giuseppe Patroni Griffi | Italy |
| Machine Gun McCain | Gli intoccabili | Giuliano Montaldo | Italy |
| Man on Horseback | Michael Kohlhaas – der Rebell | Volker Schlöndorff | West Germany |
| The Man Who Thought Life | Manden der tænkte ting | Jens Ravn | Denmark |
| Matzor | מצור | Gilberto Tofano | Israel |
| My Night at Maud's | Ma nuit chez Maud | Éric Rohmer | France |
| The Prime of Miss Jean Brodie | | Ronald Neame | United Kingdom |
| Slaves | | Herbert Biberman | United States |
| Spain Again | España otra vez | Jaime Camino | Spain |
| Z | | Costa-Gavras | France, Algeria |

=== Out of Competition ===
The following films were selected to be screened out of competition:

| English title | Original title | Director(s) | Production country |
|---|---|---|---|
| Andrei Rublev | Андрей Рублёв | Andrei Tarkovsky | Soviet Union |
| Arthur Rubinstein – The Love of Life | L'Amour de la vie – Arthur Rubinstein | François Reichenbach | France |
| The Deserter and the Nomads | Zbehovia a pútnici | Juraj Jakubisko | Yugoslavia |
| Frozen Flashes | Die gefrorenen Blitze | János Veiczi | East Germany |
| Sweet Charity (opening film) | | Bob Fosse | United States |
| That Cold Day in the Park | | Robert Altman | United States, Canada |

=== Short Films Competition ===
The following short films competed for the Grand Prix International du Festival:

- Le Ballet des Jacungos by Jean Manzon
- Cîntecele Renasterii by Mirel Ilieşiu
- Goldframe by Raoul Servais
- L'Homme aux chats by Henri Glaeser
- Moc osudu by Jiří Brdečka
- Niebieska kula by Mirosław Kijowicz
- La Pince à ongles by Jean-Claude Carrière
- Red Arrows by John Edwards
- Short Seven by Jonne Severijn
- Su sambene non est aba by Luigi Gonzo & Manfredo Manfredi
- Toccata by Herman van der Horst
- El Triunfo de la muerte by José María Gutiérrez
- Das Verräterische Herz by Paul Anczykowski
- World of Man by Albert Fischer & Michael Collyer

== Parallel sections ==
=== International Critics' Week ===
The following feature films were screened for the 8th International Critics' Week (8e Semaine de la Critique):

- Cabascabo by Oumarou Ganda (Niger)
- Charles mort ou vif by Alain Tanner (Switzerland)
- Sziget a szárazföldön (The Lady from Constantinople) by Judit Elek (Hungary)
- The Hour of the Furnaces (La Hora de los hornos) by Fernando Solanas (Argentina)
- King, Murray by David Hoffman (United States)
- More by Barbet Schroeder (Luxembourg)
- My Girlfriend's Wedding by Jim McBride (United States)
- Pagine chiuse by Gianni da Campo (Italy)
- La Rosière de Pessac by Jean Eustache (France)
- La Voie by Mohamed Slimane Riad (Algeria)
- In the Year of the Pig by Emile de Antonio (United States)
- Hunting Scenes from Bavaria (Jagdszenen aus Niederbayern) by Peter Fleischmann (West Germany)
- Paris n’existe pas by Robert Benayoun (France)

=== Directors' Fortnight ===
The following films were screened for the 1969 Directors' Fortnight (Quinzaine des Réalizateurs):

- Acéphale by Patrick Deval (France)
- Adam 2 by Jan Lenica (West Germany)
- Ballade pour un chien by René Allio, Gérard Vergez (France)
- Barravento by Glauber Rocha (Brazil)
- Between Salt and Sweet Water (Entre la mer et l'eau douce) by Michel Brault (Canada)
- Brandy in the Wilderness by Stanton Kaye (United States)
- O Bravo Guerreiro by Gustavo Dahl (Brazil)
- Brazil Year 2000 (Brasil Ano 2000) by Walter Lima Jr (Brazil)
- Calcutta (doc.) by Louis Malle (France)
- Capitu by Paulo César Saraceni (Brazil)
- Capricci by Carmelo Bene (Italy)
- Christopher's Movie Matinée by Mort Ransen (Canada)
- Le Cinématographe by Michel Baulez (France)
- De mère en fille (doc.) by Anne-Claire Poirier (Canada)
- Death by Hanging (Kōshikei) by Nagisa Oshima (Japan)
- Diary of a Shinjuku Thief (Shinjuku Dorobō Nikki) by Nagisa Oshima (Japan)
- Drôle de jeu by Pierre Kast (France)
- Duet for Cannibals by Susan Sontag (Sweden)
- The Ernie Game by Don Owen (Canada)
- L'été by Marcel Hanoun (France)
- Face To Face (Cara a cara) by Júlio Bressane (Brazil)
- La primera carga al machete by Manuel Octavio Gomez (Cuba)
- Five Girls Around the Neck (Pět holek na krku) by Evald Schorm (Czechoslovakia)
- Fuoco! by Gian Vittorio Baldi (Italy)
- A Gentle Woman (Une femme douce) by Robert Bresson (France)
- Les Gommes by Francis Deroisy (Belgium)
- Head by Bob Rafelson (United States)
- Het compromis by Philo Bregstein (Netherlands)
- The Illiac Passion by Gregory Markopoulos (France)
- Image, Flesh and Voice by Ed Emshwiller (United States)
- Invasión by Hugo Santiago (Argentina)
- Jardim de guerra by Neville dAlmeida (Brazil)
- Le Joujou Chéri by Gabriel Axel (Denmark)
- Kid Sentiment by Jacques Godbout (Canada)
- Le lit de la Vierge by Philippe Garrel (France)
- Lucía by Humberto Solas (Cuba)
- Mai 68, la belle ouvrage (doc.) by Jean-Luc Magneron (France)
- Marie by Marta Meszaros (Hungary)
- Marketa Lazarová by František Vláčil (Czechoslovakia)
- A Matrimony (Eine Ehe) by Hans Rolf Strobel, Heinrich Tichawsky (West Germany)
- Money, Money by José Varela (France)
- The Most Beautiful Age by Jaroslav Papoušek (Czechoslovakia)
- Mumbo-Jumbo by Jean-Luc Magneron (France)
- Nocturne 29 by Pere Portabella (Spain)
- Nous n’irons plus au bois by Georges Dumoulin (France)
- Our Lady of the Turks (Nostra Signora dei Turchi) by Carmelo Bene (Italy)
- Partner by Bernardo Bertolucci (Italy)
- Paul by Diourka Medveczky (France)
- Paulina Is Leaving (Paulina s’en va) by André Téchiné (France)
- La Poupée Rouge by Francis Leroi (France)
- The Rape of a Sweet Young Girl (Le viol d'une jeune fille douce) by Gilles Carle (Canada)
- Rhodesia Countdown by Michael Raeburn (Southern Rhodesia)
- Scratch Harry by Alex Matter (United States)
- Sirocco (Sirokkó) by Miklos Jancso (Hungary)
- The Smugglers (Les contrebandières) by Luc Moullet (France)
- Soliloquy by Stephen Dwoskin (United Kingdom)
- Straight to the Heart (Jusqu'au cœur) by Jean Pierre Lefebvre (Canada)
- Terry Withmore For an Example by Bill Brodie (Sweden)
- Three by James Salter (United States)
- A Time of Roses (Ruusujen aika) by Risto Jarva (Finland)
- The Trip by Roger Corman (United States)
- Tu imagines Robinson by Jean-Daniel Pollet (France)
- Vie provisoire by Mauricio Gomez Leite (Brazil)
- Les vieilles lunes by David Fahri (Switzerland)
- Vive la mort by Francis Reusser (Switzerland)
- Le Voyage by Fernando Cony Campos (Brazil)
- Wheel of Ashes by Peter Goldman (United States)
- Yvon, Yvonne by Claude Champion (Switzerland)

Short films

- 5/7/35 by Jean Mazeas (France)
- Adrien s’éloigne by Claude Guillemot (France)
- Arrabal by Jacques Poitrenaud (France)
- Athènes, ville sourire by Lambros Liaropoulos (Greece)
- Black Movie by Adrian (filmmaker) (France)
- Chinese Chekers by Stephen Dwoskin (United Kingdom)
- Einer Mädchenhaut by Klaus Schönherr (France)
- Erin Ereinté by Jean-Paul Aubert (France)
- Flash-Parc by Frank Cassenti (France)
- Fuses by Carolee Schneemann (United States)
- Galaxie by Gregory Markopoulos (France)
- Gedanken beim Befühlen by Klaus Schönherr (France)
- Hemingway by Fausto Canel (Cuba)
- Jeanne et la moto by Diourka Medveczky (France)
- Journal de séjour a Marseille by C. Lindenmeyer, Gérard Levy-Clerc (France)
- La page dévoilée by Jim Hodgetts et Mike Marshall (France)
- La poursuite impitoyable by J.J. Schakmundes, R. Guillon (France)
- Le mariage de Clovis by Daniel Duval (France)
- Le Sursitaire by Serge Huet (France)
- Les Stabiles by Christian Lara (France)
- Libi by Otto Muehl (France)
- Marie et le Curé by Diourka Medveczky (France)
- Miss Paris et le Majordome by Georges Dumoulin (France)
- Monsieur Jean-Claude Vaucherin by Pascal Aubier (France)
- N.O.T.H.I.N.G. by Paul Sharits (France)
- Naissant by Stephen Dwoskin (United Kingdom)
- On the Every Day of the Eyes of Death by Robert Beavers (France)
- Paris des Négritudes by Jean Schmidt (France)
- Permanence by Busioc Ionesco (Romania)
- Que s’est-il passé en Mai? by Jean-Pierre Savignac (France)
- Rohfilm by G. Hein (France)
- S. Macht am Sonntag-Nachmittag keinen Film by Dieter Meier (France)
- Scenes from Under Childhood by Stan Brakhage (France)
- Souvenir de la nuit du 4 by Patrice Gauthier, Henry Lange (France)
- Speak by John Latham (United Kingdom)
- The Mysteries by Gregory Markopoulos (France)
- Twice a Man by Gregory Markopoulos (France)
- Untebrochene Flugverbindungen by Dieter Meier (France)
- Versucht mit Synth. Ton by Kurt Kren (France)
- Winged Dialogue by Robert Beavers (France)

== Official Awards ==
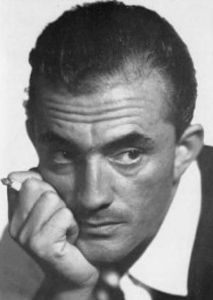
Luchino Visconti, Jury President

=== Main Competition ===
- Grand Prix du Festival International du Film: If.... by Lindsay Anderson
- Grand Prix Spécial du Jury: Ådalen 31 by Bo Widerberg
- Best Director:
  - Glauber Rocha for Antonio das Mortes
  - Vojtěch Jasný for All My Good Countrymen
- Best Actress: Vanessa Redgrave for Isadora
- Best Actor: Jean-Louis Trintignant for Z
- Jury Prize: Z by Costa Gavras (Unanimously)
- Best First Work: Easy Rider by Dennis Hopper

=== Short Films Competition ===
- Grand Prix International du Festival: Cîntecele Renasterii by Mirel Ilieşiu
- Prix spécial du Jury: La Pince à ongles by Jean-Claude Carrière

== Independent Awards ==
=== FIPRESCI Prize ===
- Andrei Rublev by Andrei Tarkovsky

Commission Supérieure Technique

- Technical Grand Prize - Special Mention: All My Good Countrymen by Vojtěch Jasný
- Short film - Special Mention:
- Cîntecele Renasterii by Mirel Ilieşiu
- Toccata by Herman van der Horst

== Media ==
- INA: Opening of the 1969 Festival (commentary in French)
- INA: Closing ceremony Cannes 1969 (commentary in French)
