= Jerome Hiler =

American filmmaker and artist (born 1943)

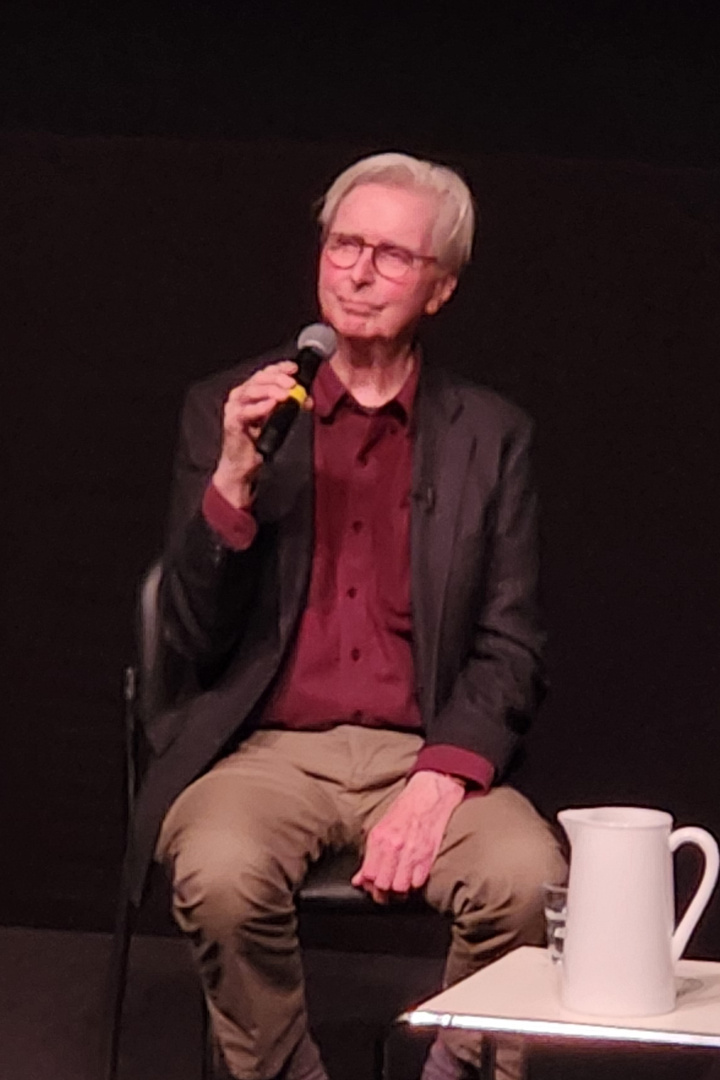
Jerome Hiler in October 2023

Jerome Hiler (born March 27, 1943) is an American experimental filmmaker, painter, and stained glass artist. Having started in New York during the New American Cinema movement, Hiler and his partner Nathaniel Dorsky moved in 1971 to San Francisco, where for many years his work was shown in the context of private salon screenings. He began to publicly screen his films in the late 1990s, releasing new films regularly since 2010. Hiler's work makes use of vivid colors, musical rhythms or structures, and layered superimpositions edited in camera.

== Early life ==
Hiler was born on March 27, 1943, in Jamaica, Queens. He grew up in a religious Catholic family. He enjoyed classical music, particularly Igor Stravinsky. In high school, Hiler enrolled in a program at the Pratt Institute where he learned painting from Natalia Pohrebinska. He was inspired by the abstract expressionists of the time. He followed Jonas Mekas's column in The Village Voice and travelled into Manhattan to attend screenings at the Bleecker Street Cinema.

After graduating high school, Hiler moved into a storefront in the East Village and took a job as a runner on the floor of the New York Stock Exchange. After his eviction from a shared artist’s loft on Eldridge Street, he moved into a Bowery hotel. He met filmmaker Gregory Markopoulos, who had cast a friend of Hiler's in The Illiac Passion, and moved into his Greenwich Village apartment.

== Career ==
=== 1963–1971: New York and New Jersey ===
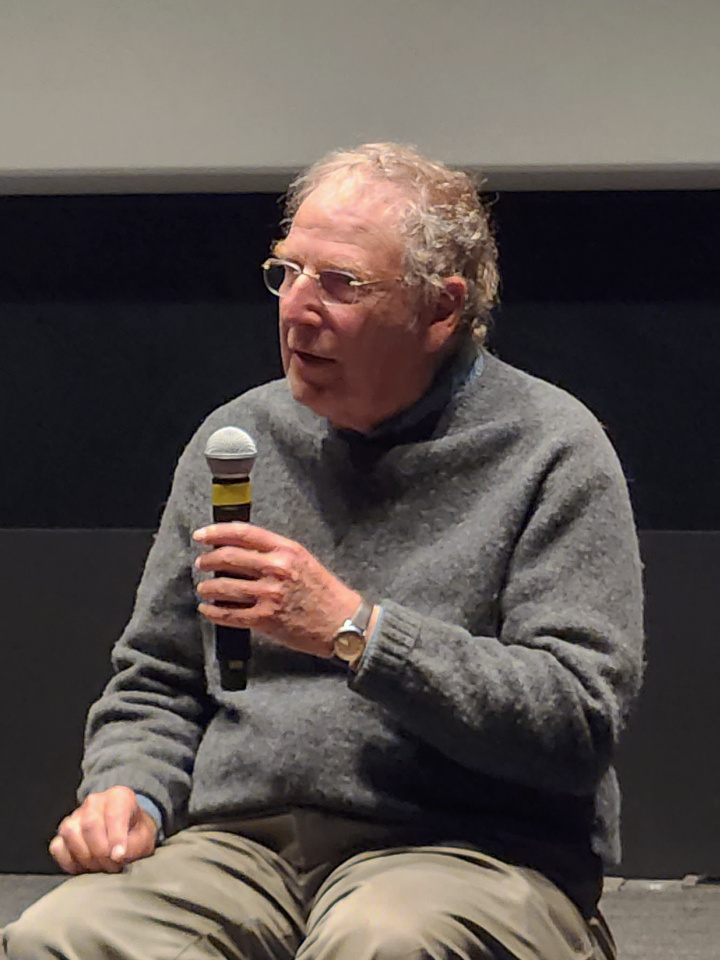
Hiler's partner Nathaniel Dorsky in 2023

Hiler became an assistant for Markopoulos, designing costumes and scouting locations for The Illiac Passion. He borrowed a Bolex 16 mm camera from Markopoulos and began shooting street scenes. He met Nathaniel Dorsky after the 1964 premiere of Dorsky's Ingreen, and the two became romantic partners.

Hiler worked as a projectionist alongside Robert Cowan, at The Film-Makers' Cinematheque at 125 West 41st St. in New York City. He was the first projectionist for Andy Warhol's Chelsea Girls and projected the film countless times. He continued shooting film during this time, preferring reversal film for its speedier development process. This also gave him the ability to continually re-edit his footage in apartment screenings he held regularly. Hiler’s first attempt at a film was born from a 100 foot roll of Kodachrome. It was slightly edited and sent to Dorsky and called Fool's Spring. Dorsky reciprocated with his own 100 foot roll and the two were subsequently titled Two Personal Gifts.

Hiler and Dorsky moved to rural Lake Owassa, New Jersey in 1966. The two were projectionists and programmers at the local branch of the Sussex County Area Reference Library, which commissioned them to make an industrial film. The resulting work Library features a minimalist soundtrack by Tony Conrad and narration by Beverly Grant.

=== 1971–present: San Francisco ===
Hiler moved with Dorsky to San Francisco in 1971, where they became involved with Canyon Cinema and San Francisco Cinematheque. Hiler re-established his practice of holding regular private screenings of his work; however, he did not complete or release any films for many years. During this time, he worked as a carpenter, the caretaker for a convent, and a stained glass artist. In 1990, he shot Acid Rock, a short 9-minute film recorded on Kodak Ektachrome reversal stock. Named after a large rock with the word "acid" on it which appears in the opening, the film exists only as its original print and did not receive distribution.

In 1995, he made Gladly Given. It was born as three 100-foot rolls of assorted content. With some additions and deletions, Hiler declared it complete. At that point, a film collective called Silt offered to include the film on its upcoming program. It was edited in camera as Hiler shot three rolls of film without remembering what had already been recorded on each one. The film was later screened at the 1997 New York Film Festival. Photographer Frederick Eberstadt commissioned Hiler's 2001 film Target Rock.

Hiler's next film project, Music Makes a City, was a documentary co-directed with Owsley Brown III. His work on it was interrupted by illness, and production ended up taking several years. Completed in 2010, the film depicts the resurgence of the Louisville Orchestra, with musical interludes scored to landscape images. Around this time, Hiler began releasing films regularly, motivated to work his footage into fixed form after seeing the difficulty of dealing with unedited reels left behind by other filmmakers after their deaths. His next film Words of Mercury experiments with multiple superimpositions. It premiered at the San Francisco Film Festival before screening at the New York Film Festival and the Whitney Biennial. In the Stone House is edited from footage taken from Hiler's time in New Jersey during the 1960s, and New Shores uses footage from the same period, but shot in California. In 2016 he completed Marginalia, in which he experimented with scratch film techniques, as well as Bagatelle I and Bagatelle II.

== Style ==
Most of Hiler's films are silent, non-narrative works. They are characterized by vivid colors and layered superimpositions. Hiler creates these effects in camera, without the use of digital tools, by capturing images with black backgrounds until a roll is filled and then restarting the roll to add additional layers.

Hiler sometimes discusses his films in relation to other media. He characterizes himself as "a painter by instinct". In lectures on "Cinema Before 1300", he points to the narratives of Gothic stained glass as being a foretaste of cinema. Stained glass appears in some of his work, with camera movements that turn it into swirls of color, and he connects scraping techniques for painted glass to his experiments with scratch film in Marginalia. Hiler's films have their own sense of rhythm, and he cites Stan Brakhage as an influence on his understanding of the relation between cinema and music.

Wheeler Winston Dixon has described Hiler's films as works in which "everyday objects, places, things and people are transformed into integers of light, creating a sinuous tapestry of restless imagistic construction." An Artforum review of Words of Mercury by P. Adams Sitney described him as part of the "rare company of significant if almost invisible filmmakers of the American avant-garde cinema." Manohla Dargis of The New York Times wrote that Hiler's "output is limited but stunning."

== Filmography ==
- Fool's Spring (Two Personal Gifts) (co-made with Nathaniel Dorsky) (1966)
- Library (co-made with Nathaniel Dorsky) (1970)
- Gladly Given (1997)
- Target Rock (2000)
- Music Makes a City (co-directed with Owsley Brown III) (2010)
- Words of Mercury (2011)
- In the Stone House (1967–70/2012)
- New Shores (1979–90/2012)
- Misplacement (2013)
- Bagatelle II (1964–2016)
- Bagatelle I (2016–2018)
- Marginalia (2016)
- Ruling Star (2019)
- Careless Passage (2024)
