= My Hand Outstretched to the Winged Distance and Sightless Measure =

Film cycle by Robert Beavers

My Hand Outstretched to the Winged Distance and Sightless Measure is a film cycle by American avant-garde filmmaker Robert Beavers. It consists of eighteen films in three parts. The films were made from the late 1960s through the early 2000s in different European countries, particularly Greece, Switzerland, and Italy. Most of the works in the cycle are radically re-edited, condensed versions of the original films. The cycle premiered in its entirety in 2005.

== Films ==
=== First part ===
The cycle opens with Early Monthly Segments, a silent film which brings together twenty different sequences. The film started in 1968 as a project called Degeneration, in which Beavers planned to create short filmic self-portraits over the course of his lifetime. Each month's segment involved a new concept for experimenting with the camera apparatus. Beavers created the twenty sketches for Degeneration, mostly out of hotels in Zurich, over two and a half years. He finished editing them but abandoned the concept in 1970 without having prints of the film made. In 1989, Beavers revisited the segments from Degeneration and decided to make a condensed version, which became Early Monthly Segments. Each of the segments reappears, with sound, as a portion of another film in the first part of the cycle.

Winged Dialogue is a portrait of Beavers' partner, filmmaker Gregory Markopoulos, shot on the island of Hydra in 1967. It appears in the cycle both as one of the Early Month Segments and as a separate film. The film unifies Beavers' artistic and romantic passions, combining images of his filmmaking practice with those of Markopoulos. Beavers edited it at an apartment in Rome, owned by actor William Berger and his wife, and at the Meuter-Titra lab in Brussels. He revised Winged Dialogue in 2000.

Plan of Brussels, filmed at the Hotel d'Egmont in Brussels, was made in late 1968 and revised in 2000. Beavers appears as the main character, seen alone in a hotel room. Jacques Ledoux, René Micha, Dimitri Balachoff, and Gisèle Frumkin make appearances as oppressive authority figures. Its macabre, fantastical themes were influenced by the paintings of James Ensor, and some of its imagery was inspired by Carl Theodor Dreyer's film Vampyr. The soundtrack for Plan of Brussels incorporates excerpts of Michel de Ghelderode's marionette play Duvelor ou la Farce du diable vieux.

The Count of Days, filmed in Zurich, was made in 1969 and revised in 2001. It outlines a romantic conflict between a middle-aged man (portrayed by author Stefan Sadkowski), a young woman, and a young man. The events are intercut with images of surgical instruments, underwear, and a dead rat. Beavers was interested in dissection at the time and added images alluding to Sigmund Freud's Rat Man case study. The soundtrack includes Sadkowski reciting his Petermann verließ den Hinterhof, the text of which appears in the film.

Palinode, filmed in Zurich, was completed in 1969 and revised in 2001. It stars Derrik Olsen as a singer who goes shopping and later meets up with a younger woman. Its soundtrack features excerpts of Wladimir Vogel's 1930 oratorio Wagadus Untergang durch die Eitelkeit. The film was inspired by Balthus's painting of Joan Miró with his daughter María Dolores.

Diminished Frame was made in 1970, while Beavers was in West Berlin through a grant from the German Academic Exchange Service, and was revised in 2001. The film deals with the aftermath of the Holocaust. It shows austere urban cityscapes in winter, occasionally turning to show the filmmaker and his tools. Its soundtrack uses sounds intended to evoke crowds: bees buzzing, horses' hooves, and chants of "Sieg Heil".

Still Light was completed in 1970 and revised in 2001. The film's first section was filmed in Hydra. It consists of portraits of architect Ron Krueck, whom Beavers had met through A. James Speyer, set against the landscape. The soundtrack incorporates church bells, water, and cicadas. The second section shows art critic Nigel Gosling in his London apartment. A voiceover by Gosling discusses Beavers' work and medium specificity in cinema.

=== Second part ===
From the Notebook of…, which begins the second part of the cycle, was filmed from 1970 to 1971 while Beavers was living in Florence. It alternates between scenes of the city, Beavers' hotel room at the Pensione Sorrelle Bandini by the Palazzo Guadagni Strozzi Sacrati, and writings in Beavers' notebook. Most of the writings were notes made during the production of Degeneration. Beavers edited the film in late 1971, after moving to Disentis, and revised it in 1998. From the Notebook of… was inspired by Leonardo da Vinci's notebooks and poet Paul Valéry's Introduction à la méthode de Léonard de Vinci.

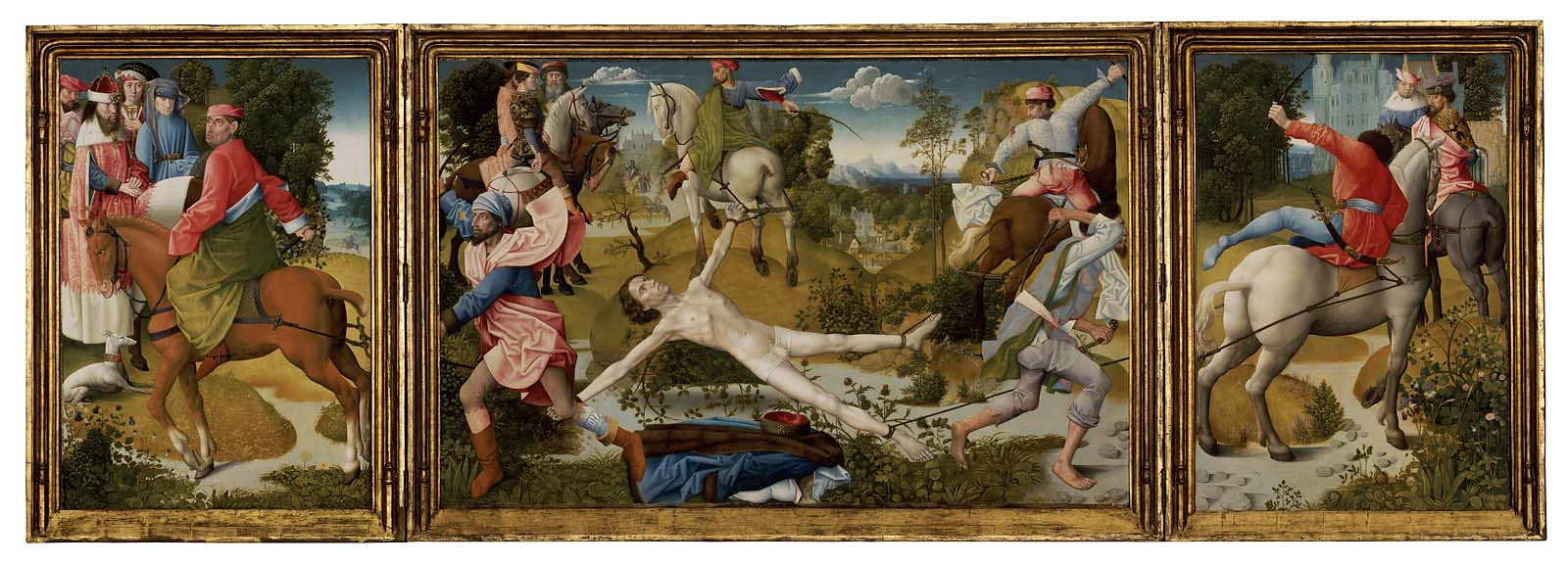
Unknown artist, Martyrdom of Saint Hippolytus, c. 1490

The Painting was made in 1972. It combines long takes shot around the Bern Theaterplatz with close-ups of the Flemish Martyrdom of Saint Hippolytus triptych. The film began with Beavers' notes in 1971, looking at Renaissance paintings in the Uffizi. He observed works that had color and non-color sections and was interested in the Flemish practice of covering the wings of triptychs with grisailles resembling sculptures. He contacted Perry T. Rathbone at the Museum of Fine Arts in Boston and arranged to have the painting's case temporarily removed so the painting could be filmed. Beavers revised the film in 1992 and added images of a broken window and Markopoulos in the bed of a hotel room.

Work Done, filmed in Florence and Grisons, was first completed in 1972. It captures various trades and crafts: felling trees, binding a book, paving a street, and cooking roventini. Inspired by Rainer Maria Rilke's New Poems, Beavers wanted to capture "actions as objects". His revision of the film in 1999 substantially changed how it was organized, moving from self-contained sequences for each of the locations toward more complex, intercut sequences that unite the different actions.

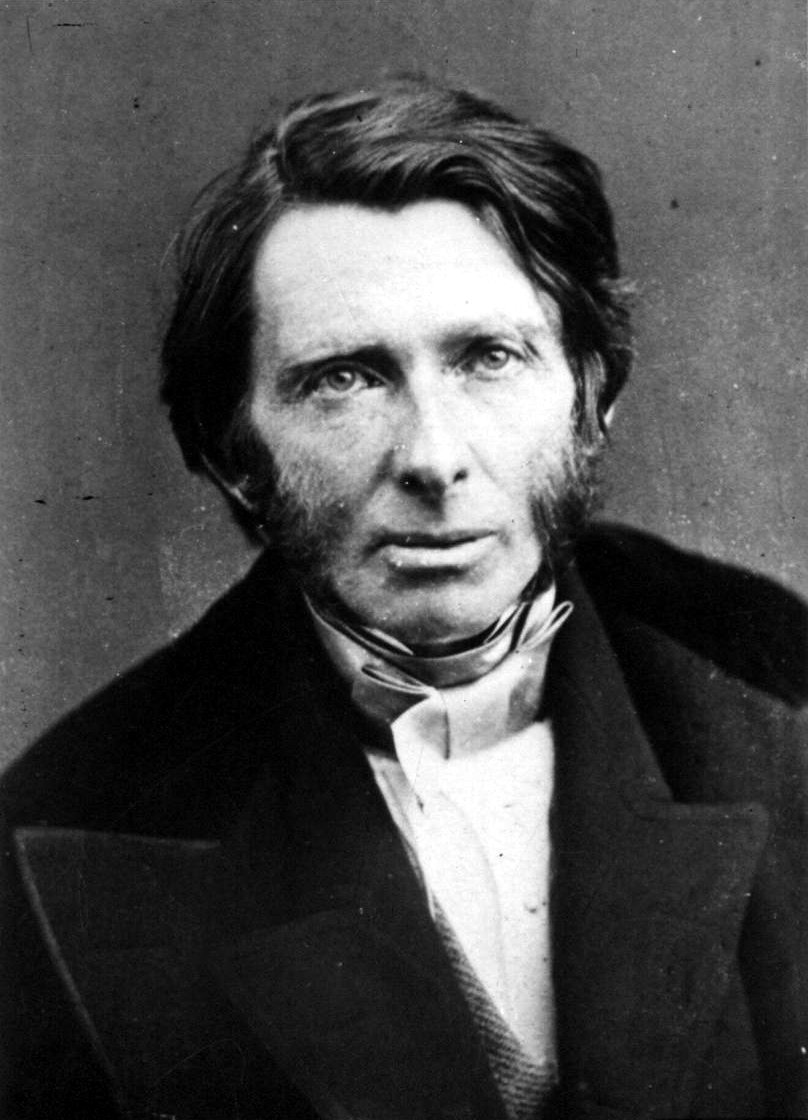
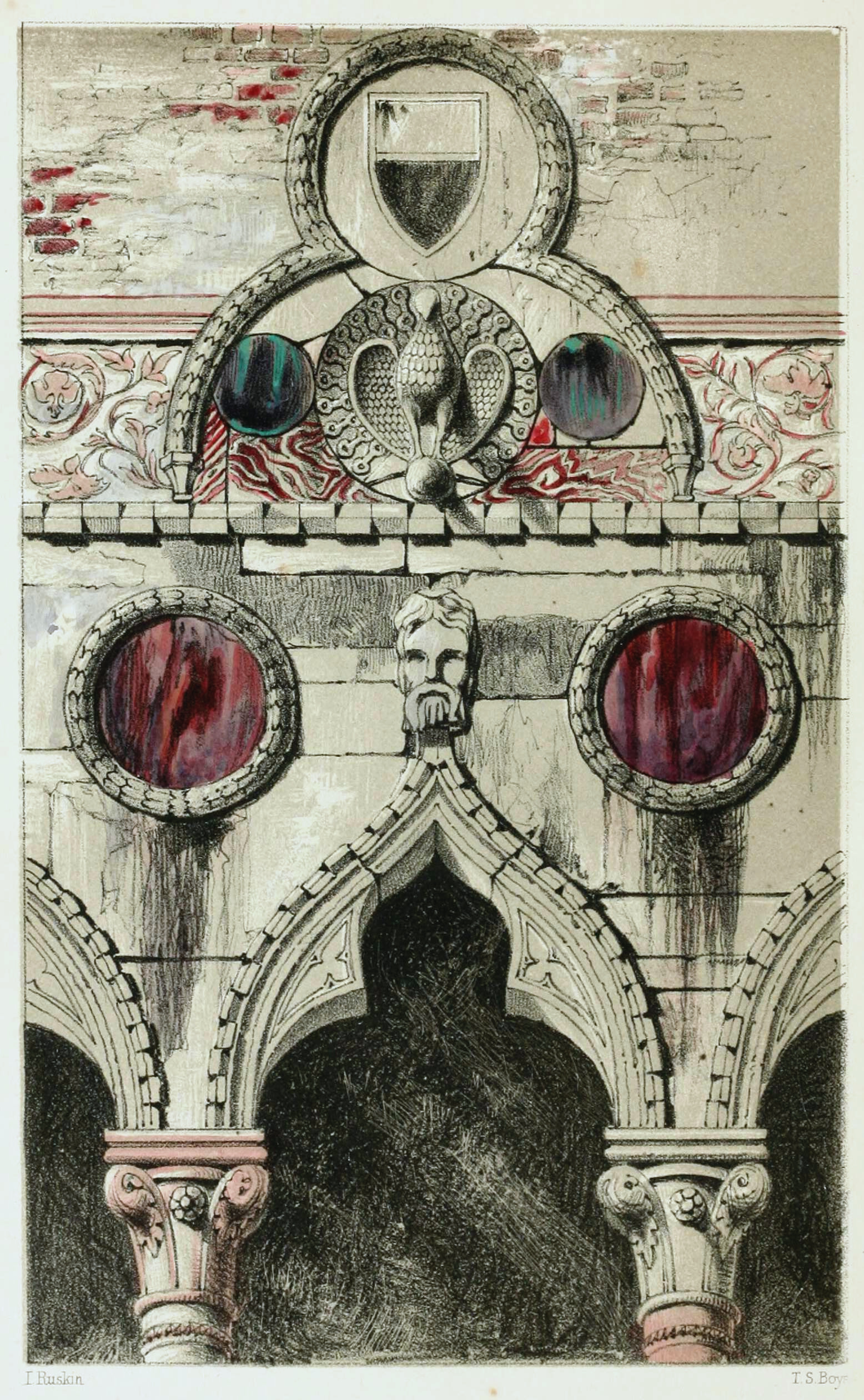
Ruskin, named after John Ruskin (left), is influenced by his illustrations of Venetian architecture in The Stones of Venice (right).

Ruskin, which was filmed starting in 1973 and completed in 1974, was shot in Venice, Grisons, and London. It is named after art critic John Ruskin, whose treatise The Stones of Venice Beavers had received as a gift. The film largely focuses on architectural elements of the cities in which it was shot. Beavers used a single color stock intended for midday outdoor lighting but filmed during early morning, midday, and late afternoon, such that images from each time of day took on a different hue. He also included black-and-white passages which were inspired by the line drawings. The film's original soundtrack features a voiceover of eighteen excerpts from The Stones of Venice. However, Beavers modified it in 1974 to replace the voiceover with the sound of pages turning. He also added a coda showing pages from Unto This Last and falling snowflakes. Beavers re-edited the film in 1992 and added a new soundtrack in 1997.

=== Third part ===
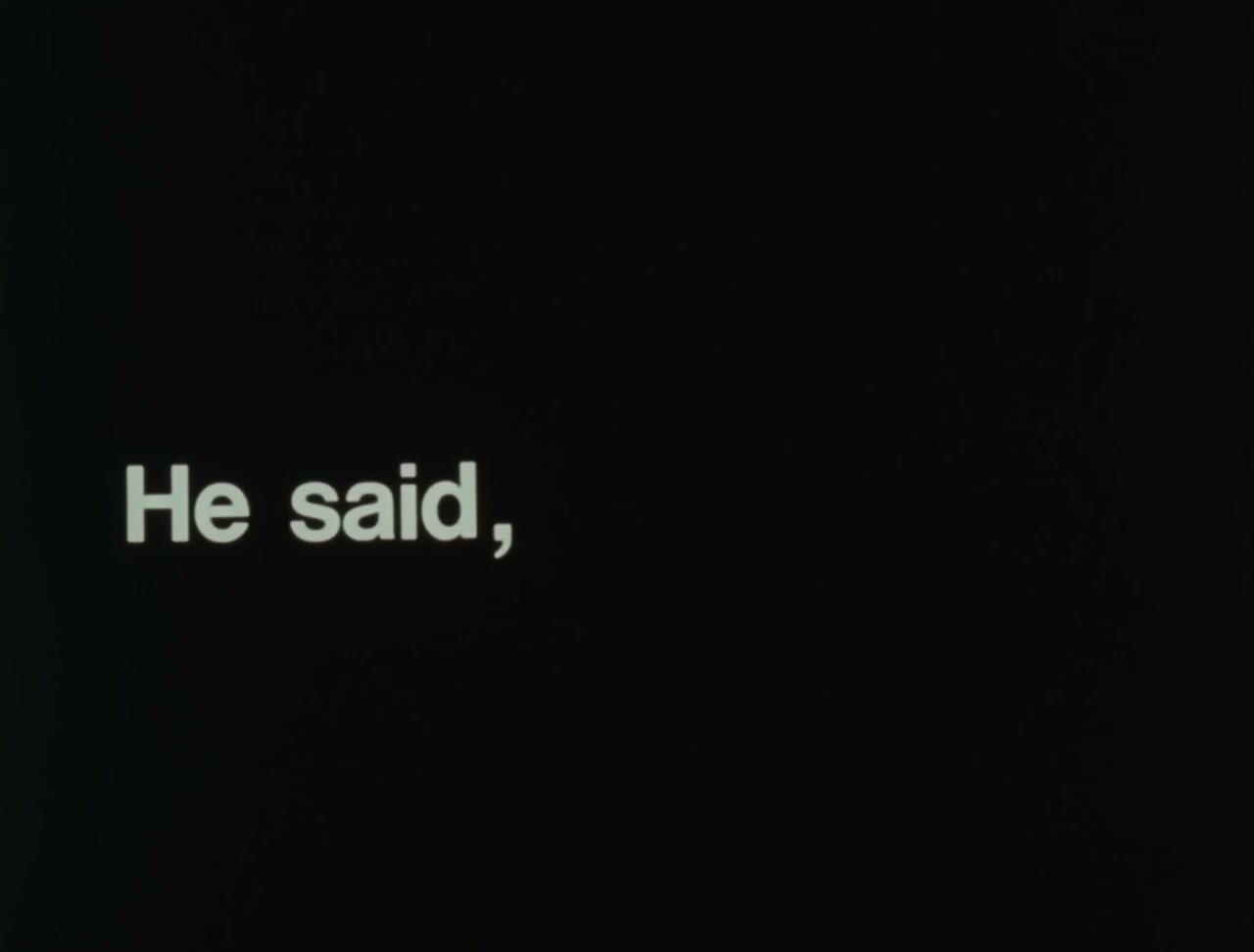
Sotiros uses intertitles that frame its images as the words of a conversation.

Sotiros, the first film in the cycle's third part, originated with three separate films: Sotiros Responds, Sotiros (Alone), and Sotiros in the Elements. Beavers shot Sotiros Responds in Greece and Switzerland, adding intertitles that present the film's images as part of a dialogue. He made Sotiros (Alone) while recovering from an injury in Rome, with excerpts of recordings from Alban Berg's opera Wozzeck. Beavers edited all three films together in 1996.

AMOR, filmed in Austria and Italy, was created in 1980. Its title refers to the Latin word for eros and reverses the Italian name for Rome. The film shows the hedge theater of Mirabell Palace in Salzburg, with curved motifs intended to conjure the domed ceilings of the city's Baroque churches. It includes close-ups of the features on a 10,000 lire banknote—the two reproductions of Andrea del Castagno's Portrait of a Man and the embossed text.

Efpsychi (Greek: Eυψυχι) was filmed from 1980 to 1982, while Beavers was living in Athens. It shows the streets and buildings in Psyri as well as a young man, Vassili Tsindoukidis, weaving in the basement of his parents' workshop. Beavers completed the film in 1983 and revised it in 1996.

Wingseed, shot in the Greek villages of Anavyssos and Lyssarea, was made in 1985. Set amidst the forests' foliage, it shows sheep, goats, and a male nude. Its soundtrack uses a pan flute, wind sounds, the goats' bells, and a shepherd's calls. Wingseed was inspired by themes of fire and creation as they appear in works by the philosopher Heraclitus, architect Francesco Borromini, and poet Gerard Manley Hopkins.

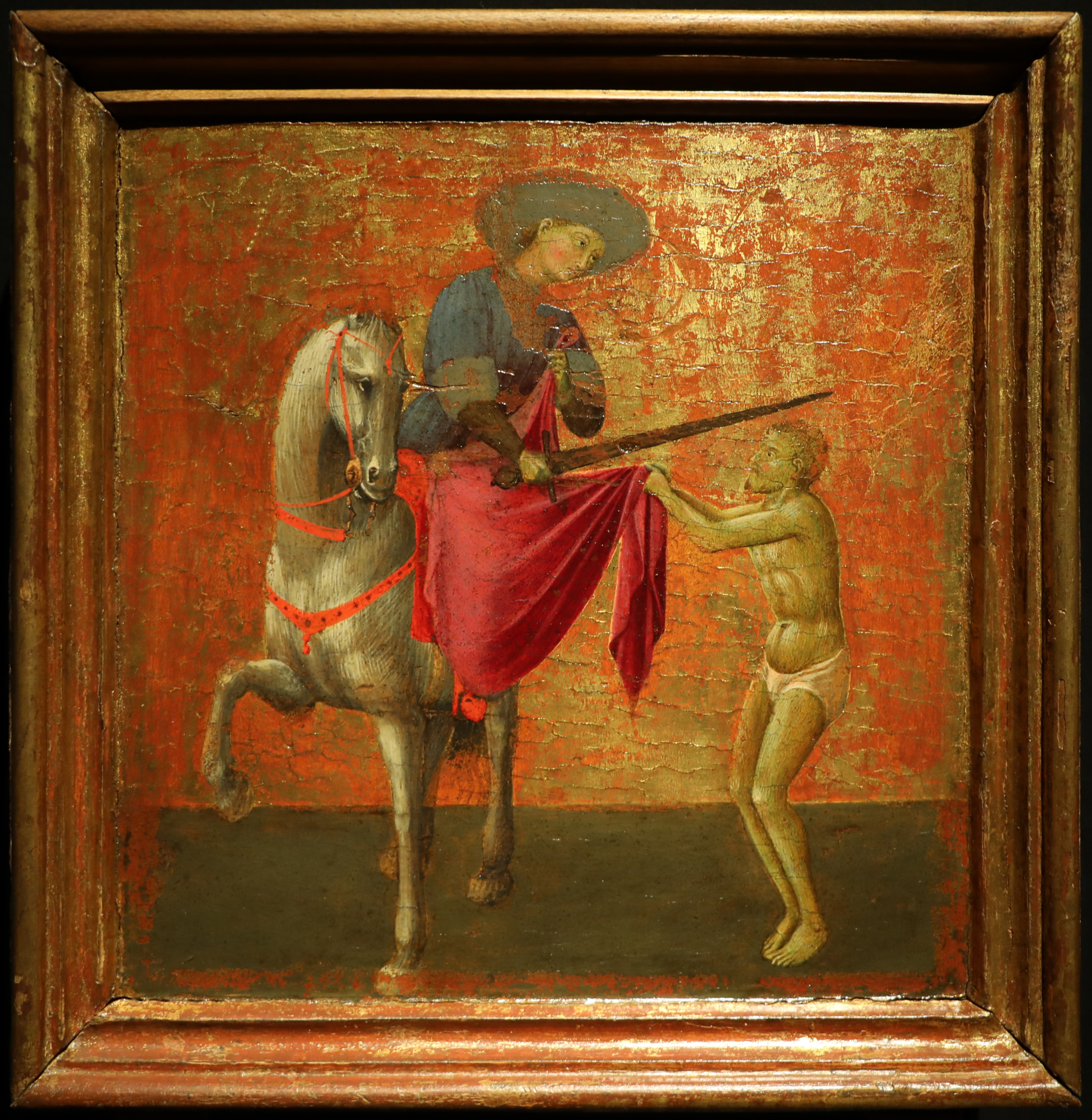
Sassetta, San Martino e il povero, 1433

The Hedge Theater was created from 1986 to 1990, shot mostly in Rome. It is the last film in which Markopoulos appears. It features architectural elements of three buildings designed by Borromini: San Carlo alle Quattro Fontane, Sant'Ivo alla Sapienza, and the Palazzo di Propaganda Fide. These are contrasted with a roccolo in Brescia. The coda depicts the legend of Saint Martin and the Beggar, using images from a panel by Sassetta. The film's camera movements were inspired by Bion's poem "The Boy and Love", in which an elder birdcatcher teaches a novice to wait for a lovebird instead of trying to capture it. Beavers revised The Hedge Theater in 2002, adding a soundtrack.

The Stoas was made between 1991 and 1997, shot in Greece. The beginning of the film shows empty arcades in Athens, before moving to landscapes in Arcadia and finally a vineyard. It originated with a plan for a film titled Stoas and Vases, until Beavers decided that the form of a vase would be difficult to translate to a filmic image. The concept was carried over to the completed film through images of Beavers' cupped hands.

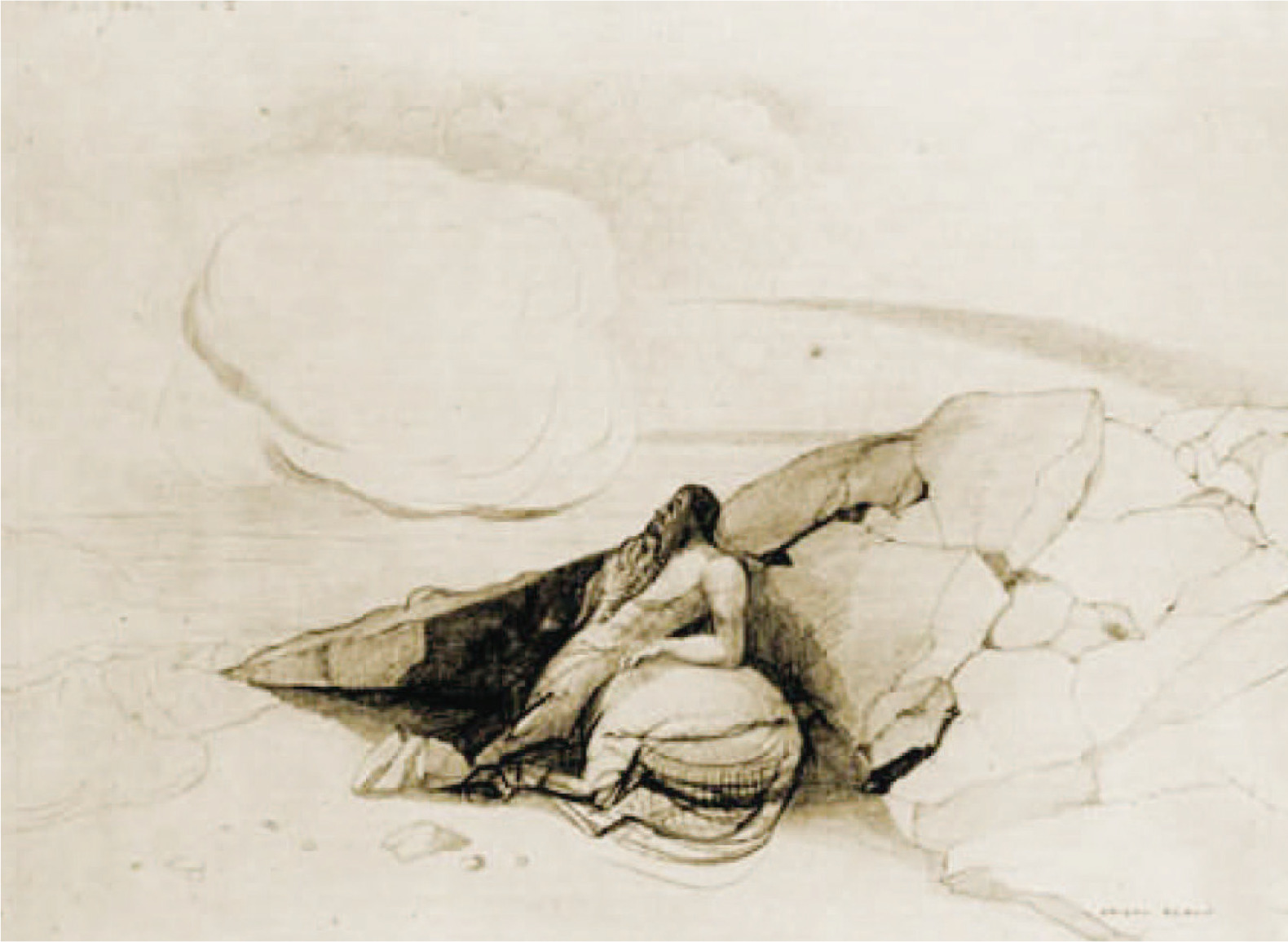
Odilon Redon, Centaur Contemplating a Cloud, 1863

The final film in the cycle, The Ground, was made in Hydra over the course of eight years, from 1993 to 2001. It includes two male figures: Beavers and a stonemason named Stamati. Odilon Redon's drawing Centaur Contemplating a Cloud was an inspiration for the film. Beavers makes reference to it through images of clouds and a donkey's hooves.

== Production ==
After viewing his early films at the Swiss Film Archive in 1988, Beavers wanted to correct what he characterized as "an aggressiveness in my early approach". This led to the idea for My Hand Outstretched to the Winged Distance and Sightless Measure. Beavers spent the late 1980s and 1990s re-editing his previous work and made changes to his earlier films, bringing their style closer to that of his later work.

The re-edited versions are considerably shorter, usually around half as long as the original films. This condensing created a rift between the image and sound tracks, which Beavers described as having "less life" in them. To update the soundtracks, he traveled to some of the original filming locations and taped new audio using a DAT recorder. However, the presence of sounds that would be anachronistic to the original films was a major obstacle. Beavers edited the new soundtracks out of a studio in Egg. The cycle was completed in 2002 with the revised version of The Hedge Theater.

== Analysis and interpretation ==
=== Filming techniques ===
A frame from Still Light in which the image of Ron Krueck is reshaped through the use of a matte and filters

The use of mattes and colored filters to mold an image is a distinctive stylistic trait in the cycle. Beavers achieves this by equipping the camera with a matte box that can hold customized masks and filters. Starting with Winged Dialogue, he also experiments with filters placed inside the camera itself. Beavers sometimes creates shifts in this effect by adjusting the camera's exposure knob during filming. He describes these improvisations as a way to produce a form of "conscious seeing for the spectator".

Beavers also works with movements of the lens turret, leaving the camera running as he adjusts its turret to switch between its 10 mm, 25 mm, and 50 mm lenses. He uses this technique to create multiple effects. Beavers uses it to form transitions between shots. In some shots, turning the turret leads to two simultaneous forms of motion within the frame, and he balances motion within the image with displacement of the image itself. He also uses the curved trajectory of the turret's rotation and the curved outline when the camera lens is off-center, combining them with curved visual elements such as architectural features.

=== Themes and motifs ===
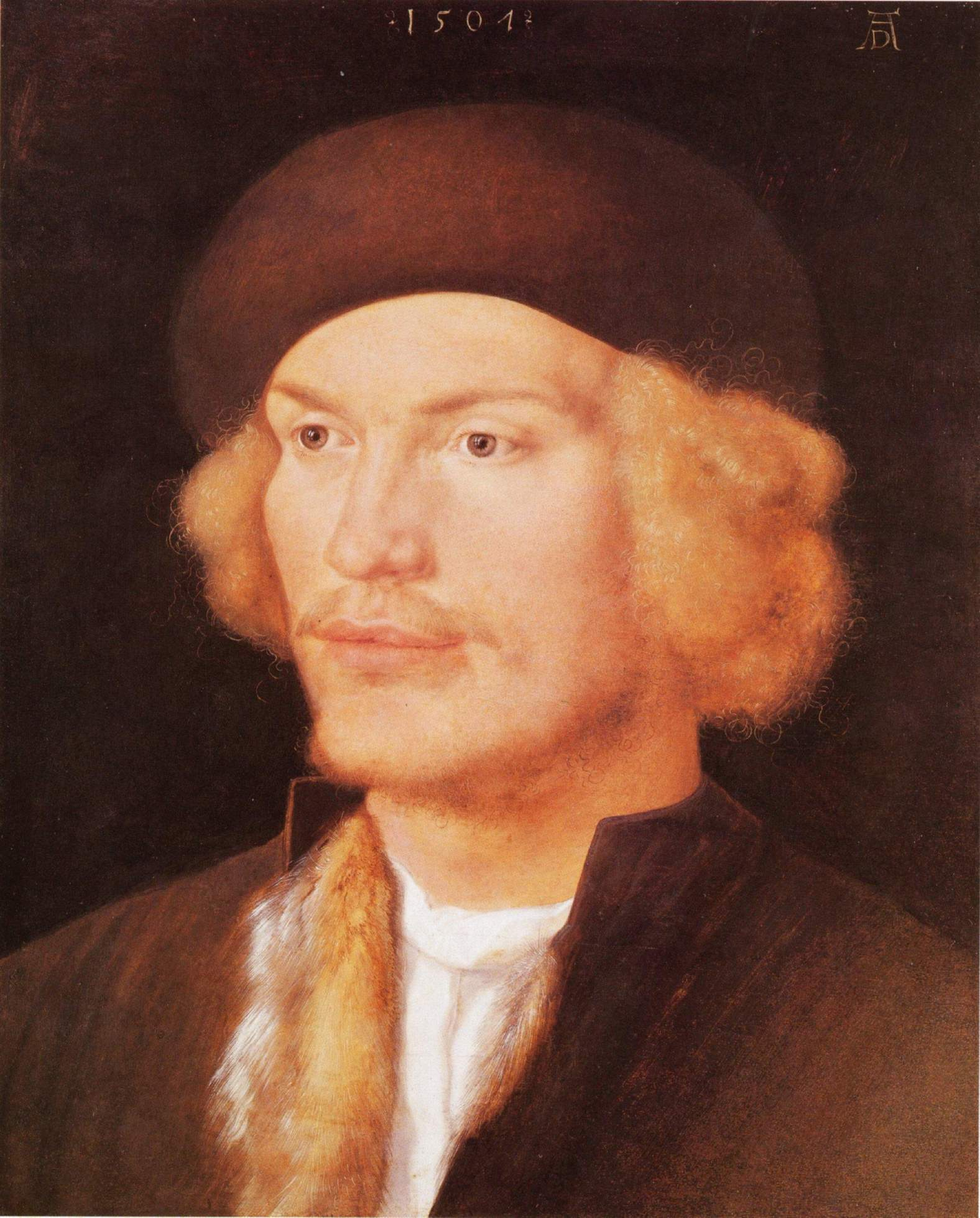
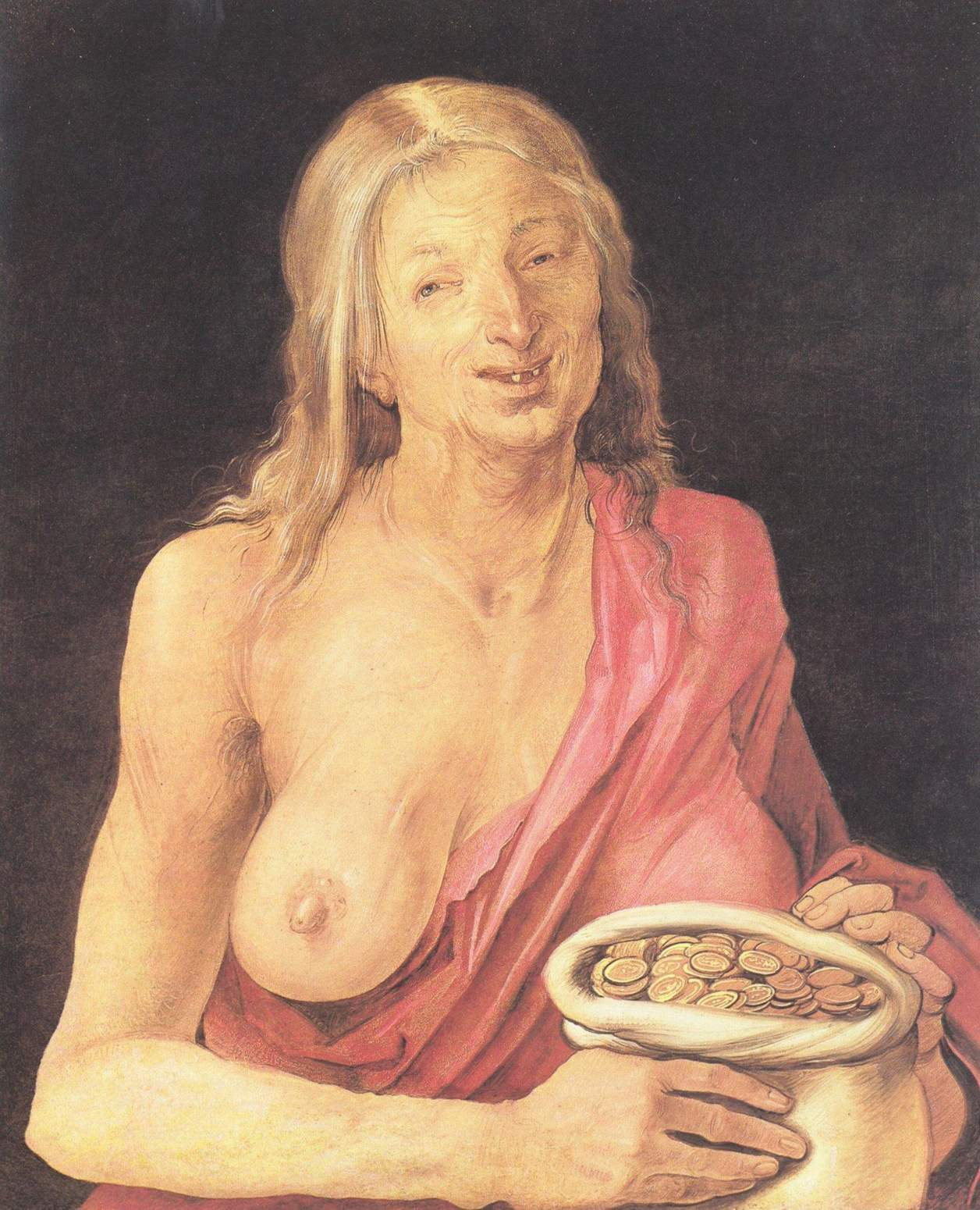
Albrecht Dürer, Portrait of a Young Man and Avarice, 1507

Creating unities between opposite sides is recurring theme in the cycle. This manifests as images of pages turning, the two sides of a hand, and dialogue between people. Beavers was inspired by Albrecht Dürer's two-sided Portrait of a Young Man, which he saw in 1968 at the Kunsthistorisches Museum in Vienna.

Critic P. Adams Sitney interprets the title My Hand Outstretched to the Winged Distance and Sightless Measure as describing "the optical infinity of the focus of the film camera" and "the musical or poetic rhythm of the soundtrack." Beavers' outstretched hand, seen reaching into the film frame, is a motif in Winged Dialogue. The individual films do not have title cards, having had them removed during the revision process, but the sound of flapping wings appears in between them, acting as a surrogate.

== Release ==
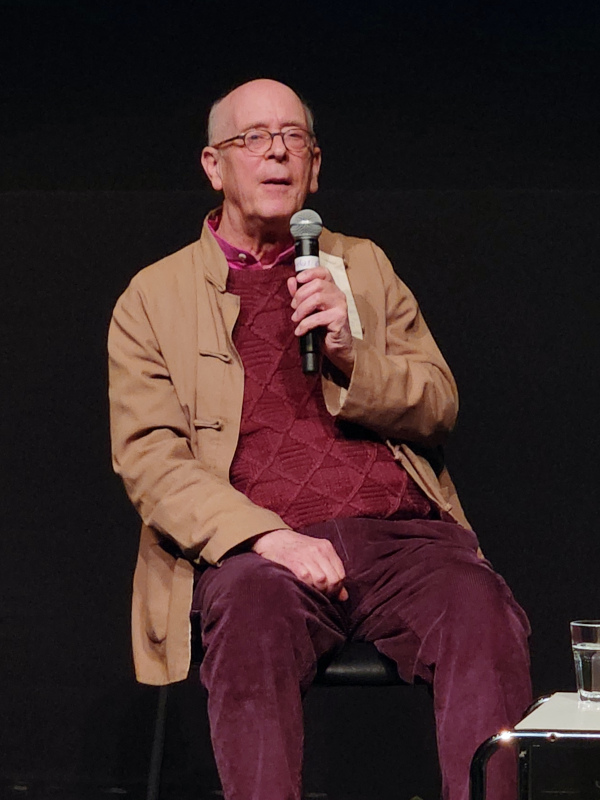
Beavers presenting the cycle in 2026

By the mid-1970s, Beavers had stopped screening his films in the United States entirely and infrequently screened them in Europe. He stopped making prints of his individual films during the 1980s. From 1980 to 1986, Beavers screened some of the works as part of the annual Temenos screenings he organized with Markopoulos. These were outdoor screenings held at Rayi Spartias, a site near Markopoulos's ancestral village of Lyssarea, located in the Arcadian highlands. After the death of Markopoulos in 1992, Beavers began showing his work more regularly.

The completed cycle premiered in its entirety in from October 7 to October 30, 2005, at a retrospective of Beavers' work at the Whitney Museum of American Art. This was followed by screenings at Tate Modern, the Austrian Film Museum, and the Berkeley Art Museum and Pacific Film Archive.

== Bibliography ==
- Balsom, Erika (2017). After Uniqueness: A History of Film and Video Art in Circulation. Columbia University Press. ISBN 978-0-231-17693-4.
- Rutkoff, Rebekah, ed. (2017). Robert Beavers. Austrian Film Museum. ISBN 978-3-901644-69-6.
- Rutkoff, Rebekah (2024). Double Vision: The Cinema of Robert Beavers. MIT Press. ISBN 978-0-262-04876-7.
- Sitney, P. Adams (2008). Eyes Upside Down: Visionary Filmmakers and the Heritage of Emerson. Oxford University Press. ISBN 978-0-19-533115-8.
