= The Ground (film) =

2001 film

- Directed by: Robert Beavers
- Starring: Robert Beavers
- Cinematography: Robert Beavers
- Edited by: Robert Beavers
- Release date: January 2001 (International Film Festival Rotterdam)
- Running time: 20 minutes

The Ground is a 2001 American independent experimental film directed by Robert Beavers. The Ground is the last film in Beavers' 18-film cycle My Hand Outstretched to the Winged Distance and Sightless Measure.

== Plot ==
A short film that draws on a connection between filmmaking and stone cutting, set on the island of Hydra in Greece.

== Cast ==
- Robert Beavers as himself

== Release ==
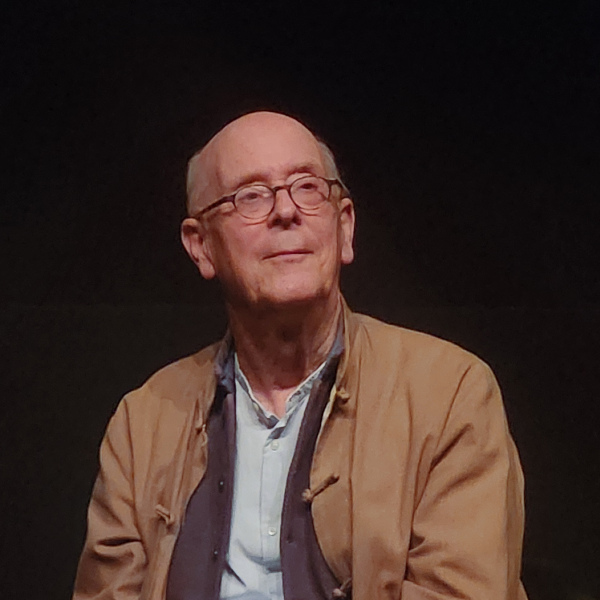
Robert Beavers presenting The Ground in 2026

The film premiered at International Film Festival in January 2001.

== Reception ==
Amy Taubin of The Village Voice wrote that the film "makes a parallel between filmmaking and stone cutting: Both depend not only on chiseling pieces so that they fit together, but also in leaving space enough for something (mind, spirit, soul) to enter or take flight."

Elvis Mitchell from The New York Times wrote that "[the film] feels elegiac, and the scenery is reminiscent of the Greek mountainsides...massive and gorgeous landscapes that have the weight of monuments."

Andrew Reichel from In Review Online contextualized The Ground within Beavers' film cycle by observing that the passing of Beavers' long-time romantic and filmmaking partner, Gregory Markopoulos had a profound impact on the tone of The Ground writing, "As the only film in the cycle to started after Markopoulos passed away, The Ground is inevitably mournful...".

== Legacy ==
In 2020, the film was selected for preservation in the National Film Registry by the Library of Congress after being deemed "culturally, historically, or aesthetically significant".
