= Eniaios =

Experimental film by Gregory Markopoulos

- Directed by: Gregory Markopoulos
- Edited by: Gregory Markopoulos
- Release date: June 25, 2004; (first order)
- Running time: 80 hours
- Countries: Greece; United States
- Language: Silent

Eniaios is a 22-part silent avant-garde film by Gregory Markopoulos, completed in 1991 and released in parts starting in 2004. The film is made from previously released and unreleased films by Markopoulos, arranged into 22 orders totaling 80 hours of footage. An extensive restoration effort on the film began several years after Markopoulos's death in 1992, and as prints of each order have been created, they have been presented in an ongoing premiere, taking place every four years at a remote site near Lyssarea, Greece.

== Production ==
Markopoulos had the idea for Eniaios in 1974, conceiving of a "complete order" of his films. In April 1987 he began focusing on re-editing them. Eniaios contains footage from his previously released works, as well as 67 unreleased films. Markopoulos completed Eniaios in Switzerland in 1991, with the entire work comprising 80 hours of footage.

Markopoulos's editing aimed to completely isolate the images from his work. He removed the sound from his films, as well as effects which combine images like superimpositions or dissolves. Clear or black leader separates distinct images, such that they never touch. Each image is sustained for no more than a few frames. The brief articulation of an image leaves a lingering afterimage which may interact with the following image. The limited perceptibility of the images, due to the short durations and use of flipped images, is offset through repetition.

== Release ==
=== The Temenos ===
During the late 1960s, Markopoulos had begun to envision a pilgrimage site for the purpose of screening films. His 1968 article "Towards a Constructive Complex in Projection" developed this idea, describing it as something similar to a Greek amphitheatre with multiple screens. Critic P. Adams Sitney contrasts the development of this concept with the establishment of Anthology Film Archives in 1970. Markopoulos examined potential locations during the 1970s. He considered two villages in Switzerland, Disentis in the Rhine valley and Lü in Val Müstair, but was concerned that they did not have the "Greek Spirit".

After plans fell through for an event at a grove near Tripoli, Markopoulos held the first Temenos screening at Rayi Spartias in 1980. The site was located near his ancestral village of Lyssarea, located in the Arcadian highlands. He began to screen his films exclusively at Rayi Spartias and called the site a temenos, in reference to Ancient Greek religious practices.

=== Restoration and screenings ===
After Markopoulos's death in 1992, there had been little critical attention toward his work for years. His partner Robert Beavers began showing Markopoulos's films and formed a nonprofit organization dedicated to preserving and distributing them. Several museums held retrospectives, and critic P. Adams Sitney included a chapter about Markopoulos, previously removed at Markopoulos's request, in a 2002 revised edition of his book Visionary Film.

The splices in the original copy of Eniaios became unglued and required an extensive reconstruction effort so it could be printed and screened. Beavers began the restoration in 2000, at Janice Allen's Cinema Arts laboratory in Pennsylvania. The first screening of Eniaios took place on June 25 to June 27, 2004, during which the first three orders were presented. It was held at an outdoor cinema set up in an open field, with a screen, projector, beanbags, and benches. The event was attended by 100–200 people who had travelled to the site.

Since the 2004 event, the film's cycles have premiered at Rayi Spartias on a quadrennial basis, with the 2020 screening delayed to 2022 because of the COVID-19 pandemic. The time between screenings has been dictated by the high cost of creating prints, nearly $30,000 for each order. Funding has come from the distribution income of Markopoulos's and Beavers' films, private donations, and grants. After the first screening, restoration work began at Temenos Archive in Uster, Switzerland, which now holds Markopoulos's films. Restoration efforts moved in 2015 to a studio in Berlin.

== Bibliography ==
- Balsom, Erika (2017). "A Cinematic Bayreuth". After Uniqueness. Columbia University Press. ISBN 978-0-231-17693-4.
- Sitney, P. Adams (2014). "Markopoulos and the Temenos". The Cinema of Poetry. Oxford University Press. ISBN 978-0-19-933703-3.
