= Music Makes a City =

- Directed by: Owsley Brown III; Jerome Hiler
- Narrated by: Will Oldham
- Edited by: Anne Flatté; Nathaniel Dorsky
- Release date: May 20, 2010
- Running time: 103 minutes
- Country: United States
- Language: English

Music Makes a City is a 2010 American documentary film directed by Owsley Brown III and Jerome Hiler. It examines the history of the Louisville Orchestra.

== Production ==
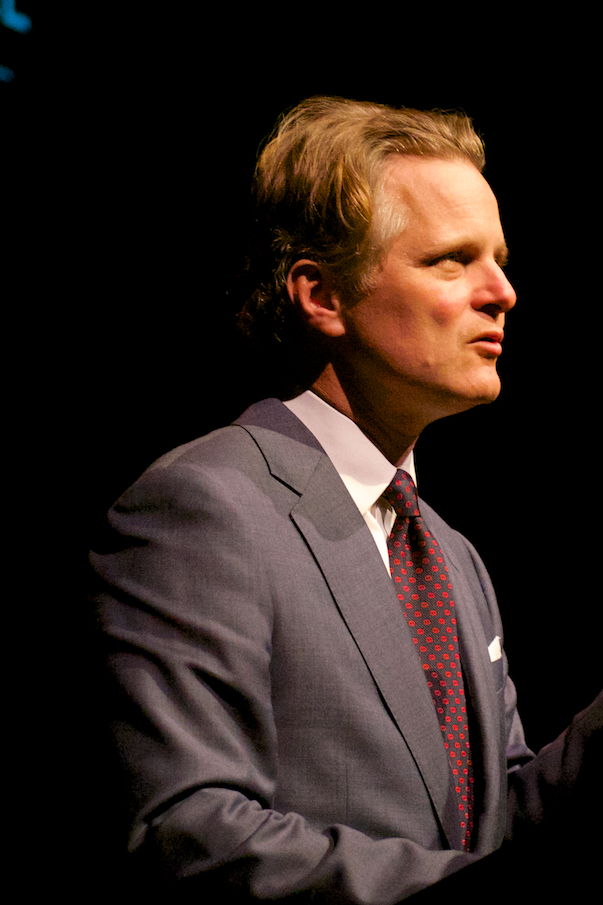
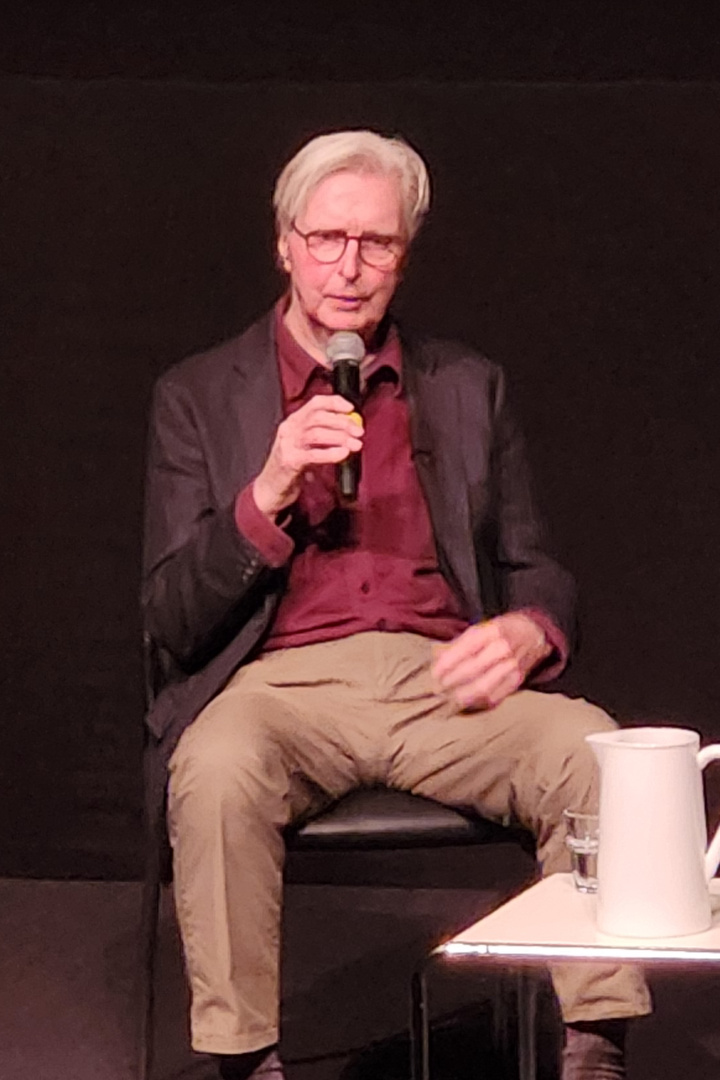
Directors Owsley Brown III and Jerome Hiler

The film was conceived by Brown and Hiler after a performance by the San Francisco Ballet. Hiler was discussing George Balanchine and the impact of strong leadership on culture. He used Mayor Charles R. Farnsley as an example for Brown, whose family came from Louisville. As Hiler explained the story of the Louisville Orchestra, Brown suggested writing a book about it. Hiler responded that making a film would allow them to include the orchestra's music.

Hiler, accustomed to the handheld Bolex camera, worked using a tripod to capture static shots. In adapting to this manner of shooting, he was influenced by Gregory Markopoulos, with whom he had worked during the 1960s. Production took over five years, with delays because of Hiler's health during that time.

The film's soundtrack was assembled by Hiler. Much of it comes from a collection of recordings he found at a used record store on Haight Street. The soundtrack is arranged in an unusual style, where sections about the orchestra are separated by segments in which its music is paired with footage around Louisville. This structure originated in an earlier project by Brown, the 1999 documentary Night Waltz, in which Paul Bowles had required that his music be presented in its original form without dialogue on top of it. Anne Flatté edited the film, which grew as long as 5½ hours in one rough cut, along with Hiler's partner Nathaniel Dorsky.

== Release ==
The film premiered in Louisville at the Brown Theatre and Baxter Avenue Theatres on May 20, 2010. It received a DVD release, and PBS broadcast it nationally in 2014.

This led to the production of Music Makes a City Now, a PBS web series directed by Flatté. The 2015 series follows the Louisville Orchestra under conductor Teddy Abrams.

== Critical reception ==
Describing the film as "happily anomalous", Variety reviewer Ronnie Scheib said that it, "like the unique philharmonic orchestra it celebrates, packs near-radical etudes, concertos and symphonies into a very conservative package." For the Los Angeles Times, Gary Goldstein wrote that "despite its gorgeous soundtrack, historical sweep and wealth of archival material, [the film] is weakened by sluggish pacing and an overly detailed, increasingly narrow focus." Nick Schager of The Village Voice said that Music Makes a City "primarily utilizes traditional aesthetics (archival materials, talking heads), but weaves them together with editorial gracefulness." For Time Out New York, reviewer Andrew Schenker wrote that it included "both a wealth of detail and a tad too much nostalgia".

The film won a Gramophone Classical Music Award for DVD Documentary in 2012.
