= Liodora =

Liodora Λιοδώρα
- Community

- Location within Greece
- Coordinates: 37°38′N 21°51′E
- Country: Greece
- Administrative region: Peloponnese
- Regional unit: Arcadia
- Municipality: Gortynia
- Municipal unit: Iraia
- Elevation: 160 m (520 ft)

Population (2021)
  - Community: 52
- Time zone: UTC+2 (EET)
  - Summer (DST): UTC+3 (EEST)

Liodora (Greek: Λιοδώρα) is a small village in Arcadia, the central region of the Peloponnese area of Greece.

Liodora is part of the Municipal Unit of Iraia, which belongs to the Municipality of Gortynia. It is situated on a low hill near the left bank of the river Ladon, 5 km northeast of Tripotamia, 8 km west of Paloumpa and 17 km northwest of Dimitsana, the capital of the Municipality.

== Geography ==
Liodora is situated in a hilly plateau and features several hills. The view to the south are blocked by a mountain slope. Kryonero has several valleys around the area, which also contains forests, grasslands, farmlands and bushes.

== Information ==
Its main production are olives, citrus, fruits, vegetables and other crops, as well as life stock products. The village can be seen as far as to the north and east.

== History ==
The name Liodora was probably derived from Heliodorus (Greek: Ηλιόδωρος) or Leodorus (Greek: Λεόδωρος), an ancient ruler or nobleman of the area, or it is a derivative of the word "Herodora" (Greek: Ηροδώρα), denoting Hera, the wife of Zeus, giving gifts. About 5 km to the south of the contemporary village was Ancient Irea, a city built next to the Alfeios River, close to Ancient Olympia. In the Middle Ages, the village was the capital of the entire region, which also bared its name.

The location of the lost ancient city of Melaneai (Greek: Μελανεαί) is believed to be in the vicinity of contemporary Liodora. Outside the village there is also an ancient cheese factory.

== Population ==
Year	Population
1981	112
1991	111
2001	114
2011	68
2021	52

View of Liodora

== See also ==
- List of settlements in Arcadia
