= Twice a Man (film) =

1963 American avant-garde film by Gregory Markopoulos

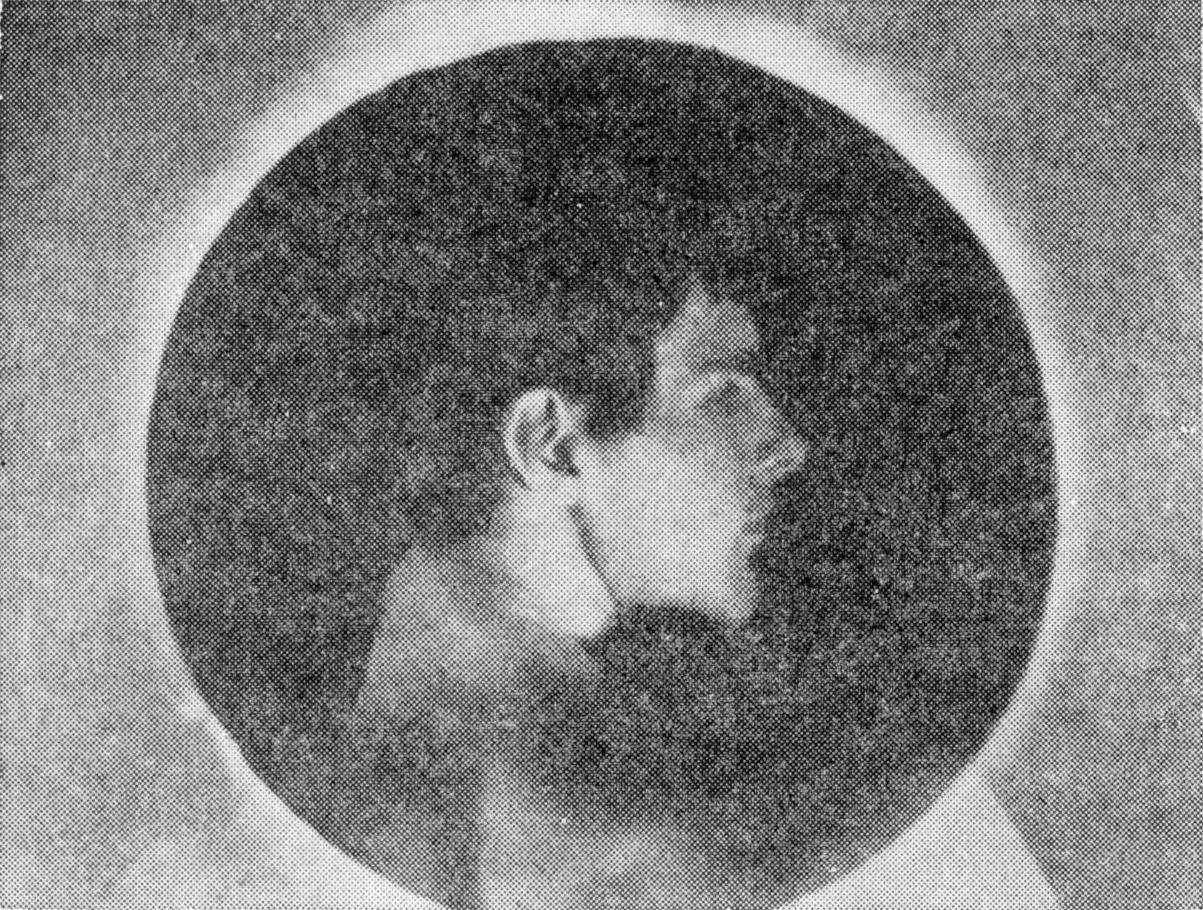
- Publicity still from a 1963 advertisement
- Directed by: Gregory Markopoulos
- Produced by: Gregory Markopoulos
- Cinematography: Gregory Markopoulos
- Edited by: Gregory Markopoulos
- Distributed by: The Film-Makers' Cooperative
- Release date: June 15, 1963
- Running time: 49 minutes
- Country: United States
- Language: English

Twice a Man is a 1963 American avant-garde film directed by Gregory Markopoulos.

== Synopsis ==
The film opens with a black screen and the sound of rain. Paul stands at the edge of a roof, considering suicide, until the artist-physician places his hand on Paul's shoulder. Paul takes the ferry across the New York Harbor and visits his mother.

At his mother's house, memories and dreams of Paul, the artist-physician, and Paul's mother as a young and old woman are shown. In the film's ending, Paul collapses while dancing, and the artist-physician goes to kiss him, their faces merging in superimposition. Once the artist-physician moves away, the image of Paul cracks as if a broken mirror, and a white screen remains.

== Cast ==
- Paul Kilb as Paul
- Albert Torgesen as the artist-physician
- Olympia Dukakis as the young mother
- Violet Roditi as the elder mother

== Production ==
Markopoulos's casting of Olympia Dukakis marked her first screen role. He shot the film in New York in March 1963, using a camera from Charles Levine. Markopoulos originally planned to include sync sound in Twice a Man but revised this several times while making the film. He prepared a script where dialogue was related to the images but not synchronized. He decided to instead use voice-over for a few of the characters before paring this down to voice-over for the mother only. His revised script reduced the dialogue to words and phrases that could be arranged as needed in the soundtrack. Markopoulos edited the scenes in order, with a highly intricate style in which shots may be broken up by sudden, rapid bursts of images.

== Themes ==
Twice a Man is a modern retelling of the Greek myth of Hippolytus. Paul's ferry ride is symbolic of crossing the River Styx. Events at the house make reference to the offering of a lock of hair, the incestuous relation with Phaedra, and the heavenly rebirth. Critic P. Adams Sitney characterizes Twice a Man as a mythopoeic film, connecting it to other contemporary works in American experimental cinema—Dog Star Man, Scorpio Rising, and Heaven and Earth Magic—with a similar interest in myth-making.

== Release ==
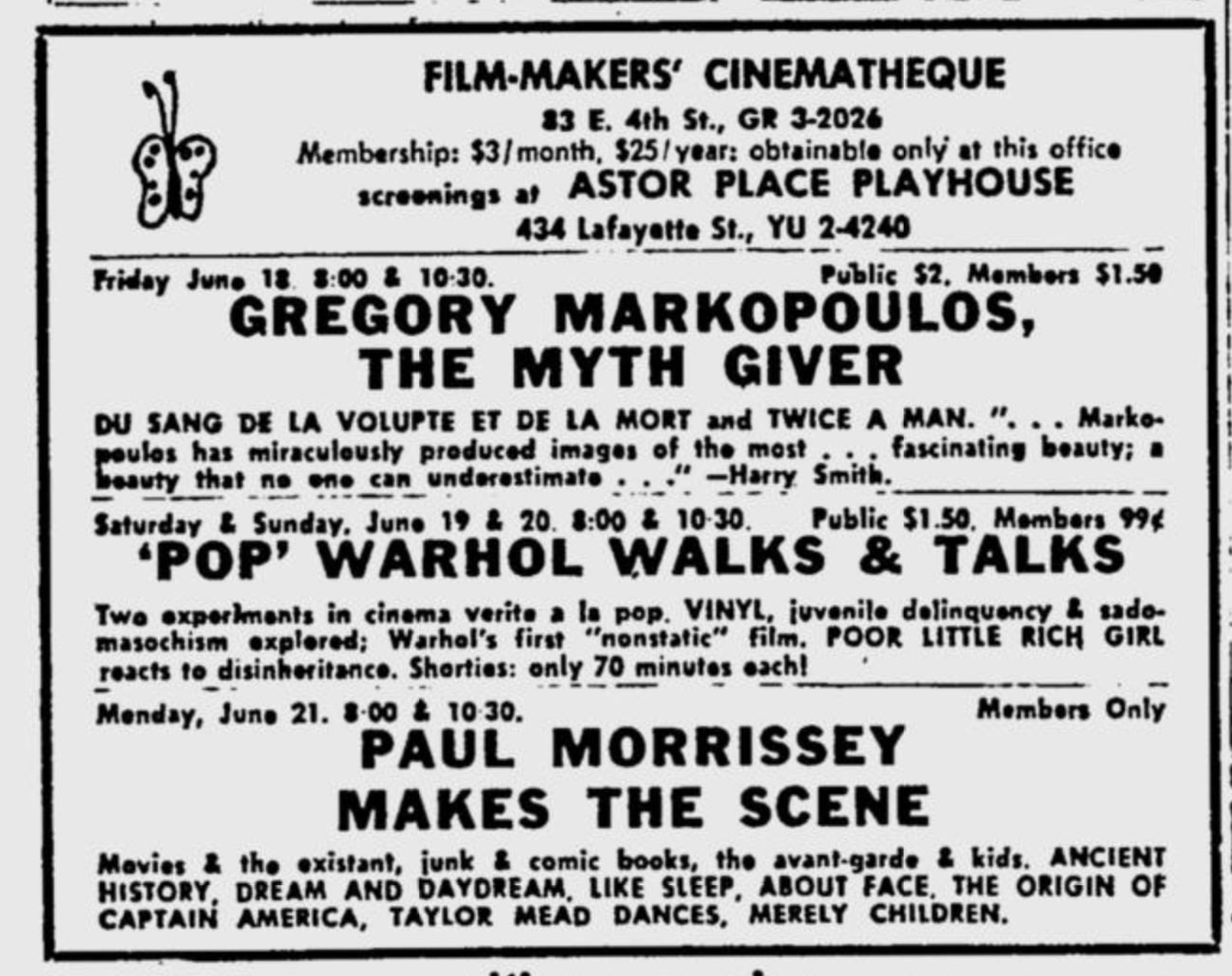
A 1965 advertisement for Du sang de la volupte et de la mort and Twice a Man

During the production process, Markopoulos started to hold public screenings in which he showed his rush prints. A silent version of Twice a Man screened at the Gramercy Arts Theatre on June 15, 1963, as part of a fundraiser organized by the Film-Makers' Cooperative to finish the film. Jonas Mekas documented the premiere in several shots of his film Lost, Lost, Lost. Twice a Man was first shown with its completed soundtrack on October 4, 1963.

Markopoulos submitted the film to the third Knokke-Le-Zoute Experimental Film Festival in Belgium, where it won a $2,000 prize. Because of an incident at the festival where Flaming Creatures could not be screened, Mekas floated the idea of prize recipients refusing their awards; however, Markopoulos decided to accept it.

In 1967, Markopoulos made a double projection of the film called Twice a Man Twice, in which one copy of the original film is played forward and the other in reverse. He included segments from Twice a Man in cycles 4, 8, 15, and 19 of his final project Eniaios. A re-edited version of Twice a Man was screened at the 1997 New York Film Festival.

== Reception ==
Jonas Mekas praised the film in his column for The Village Voice, calling it "the most important and most beautiful film to open in New York this year". Critic Fred Camper credited it as "the film that got me interested in cinema."

Ron Rice's The Queen of Sheba Meets the Atom Man includes a parody of Twice a Man. His rough cut of the film, which was unfinished when he died in 1963, ends on the ferry where Twice a Man begins. Director Werner Schroeter cited the film's "curiously slow, long-drawn-out sequences and frankly gay images of men" as an influence on his 1969 film Eika Katappa. The film is now part of Anthology Film Archives' Essential Cinema Repertory collection.

== Bibliography ==
- Curtis, David (1971). Experimental Cinema. Dell Publishing Co.
- Renan, Sheldon (1967). An Introduction to the American Underground Film. E. P. Dutton & Co.
- Schroeter, Werner; Lenssen, Claudia (2017). Days of Twilight, Nights of Frenzy. University of Chicago Press. ISBN 978-0-226-01911-6.
- Sitney, P. Adams (2002). Visionary Film: The American Avant-Garde, 1943–2000. Oxford University Press. ISBN 978-0-19-514886-2.
- Sitney, P. Adams (2014). The Cinema of Poetry. Oxford University Press. ISBN 978-0-19-933703-3.
- Suchenski, Richard I. (2016). Projections of Memory: Romanticism, Modernism, and the Aesthetics of Film. Oxford University Press. ISBN 978-0-19-027411-5.
