= Dimitris Plapoutas =

Greek general and politician (1786–1864)

Dimitrios Plapoutas
- Δημήτρης Πλαπούτας
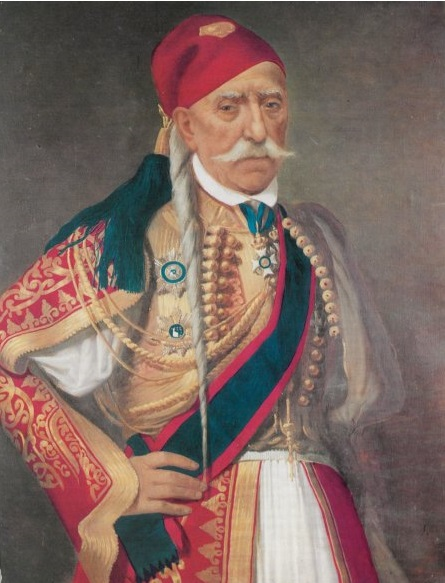
- A portrait of Plapoutas in Royal Phalanx uniform

Senator
- In office 1847–1862
- Monarch: Otto
- Prime Minister: Kitsos Tzavellas; Georgios Kountouriotis; Konstantinos Kanaris; Antonios Kriezis; Alexandros Mavrokordatos; Dimitrios Voulgaris; Athanasios Miaoulis; Ioannis Kolokotronis

Member of Parliament for Karytaina
- In office 1844–1847
- Monarch: Otto
- Prime Minister: Ioannis Kolettis

Personal details
- Born: 15 May 1786 Paloumpa, Morea Eyalet, Ottoman Empire (now Greece)
- Died: 5 July 1864 (aged 78) Paloumpa, Kingdom of Greece
- Parent: Kollias Plapoutas (Father)
- Awards: Order of the Redeemer
- Nickname(s): Koliopoulos; Κολιόπουλος

Military service
- Allegiance: United Kingdom; First Hellenic Republic; Kingdom of Greece
- Branch/service: British Army; Hellenic Army
- Years of service: 18
- Rank: General
- Unit: 1st Regiment Greek Light Infantry; Royal Phalanx
- Battles/wars: Greek War of Independence; Siege of Patras; Battle of Lalas; Siege of Tripolitsa; Battle of Valtetsi; Siege of Acrocorinth; Battle of Maniaki

Dimitris 'Koliopoulos' Plapoutas (Greek: Δημήτρης Κολιόπουλος Πλαπούτας) (1786 – 1865) was a Greek general who fought during the Greek War of Independence against the rule of the Ottoman Empire.

== Biography ==
Plapoutas was born on in Paloumba in the Arcadia region of the Peloponnese, Ottoman Empire, the son of Kollias Plapoutas. This is of course the reason why Theodoros Kolokotronis referred to him simply as "Koliopoulos" (Greek: Ό Κολιόπουλος).

In 1811, he left Paloumba for the Ionian Islands where he became an officer in the 1st Regiment Greek Light Infantry. In 1818, he joined the Filiki Eteria, which was planning to liberate Greece from Ottoman control.

During the revolution, Dimitris Plapoutas took part in the Siege of Tripolitsa, the capture of the Acrocorinth, the Battle of Valtetsi, the Battle of Maniaki and other battles.

After independence, along with General Theodoros Kolokotronis and General Kitsos Tzavelas, Plapoutas supported Prince Otto of Bavaria as the King of Greece. However, later he opposed the Bavarian-dominated regency during his rule. He was charged with high treason and on 7 June 1834 he was imprisoned at the Palamidi along with Kolokotronis and both sentenced to death and both later pardoned in 1835. Plapoutas then became involved in Greek politics and served in Parliament (1844–1847) and in the Senate (1847–1862). He was made an honorary bodyguard of King Otto and was entrusted with escorting him to his new kingdom.

Plapoutas also had a brother, Georgios, who fought alongside him in many battles and died in the Battle of Lalas.

When he was around seventy years old, Plapoutas married a woman in her thirties and had one child, a girl named Athanasia. Plapoutas died shortly afterwards.

His house still stands (albeit heavily damaged from an earthquake during the 1960s) in his home town of Paloumpa, Arcadia.

== Gallery ==
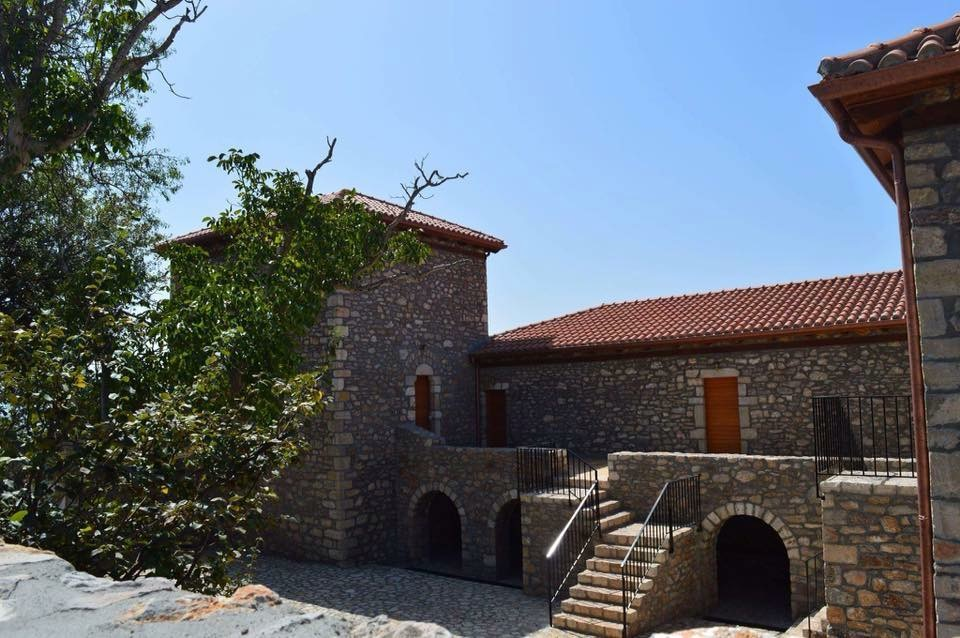
House of Plapoutas

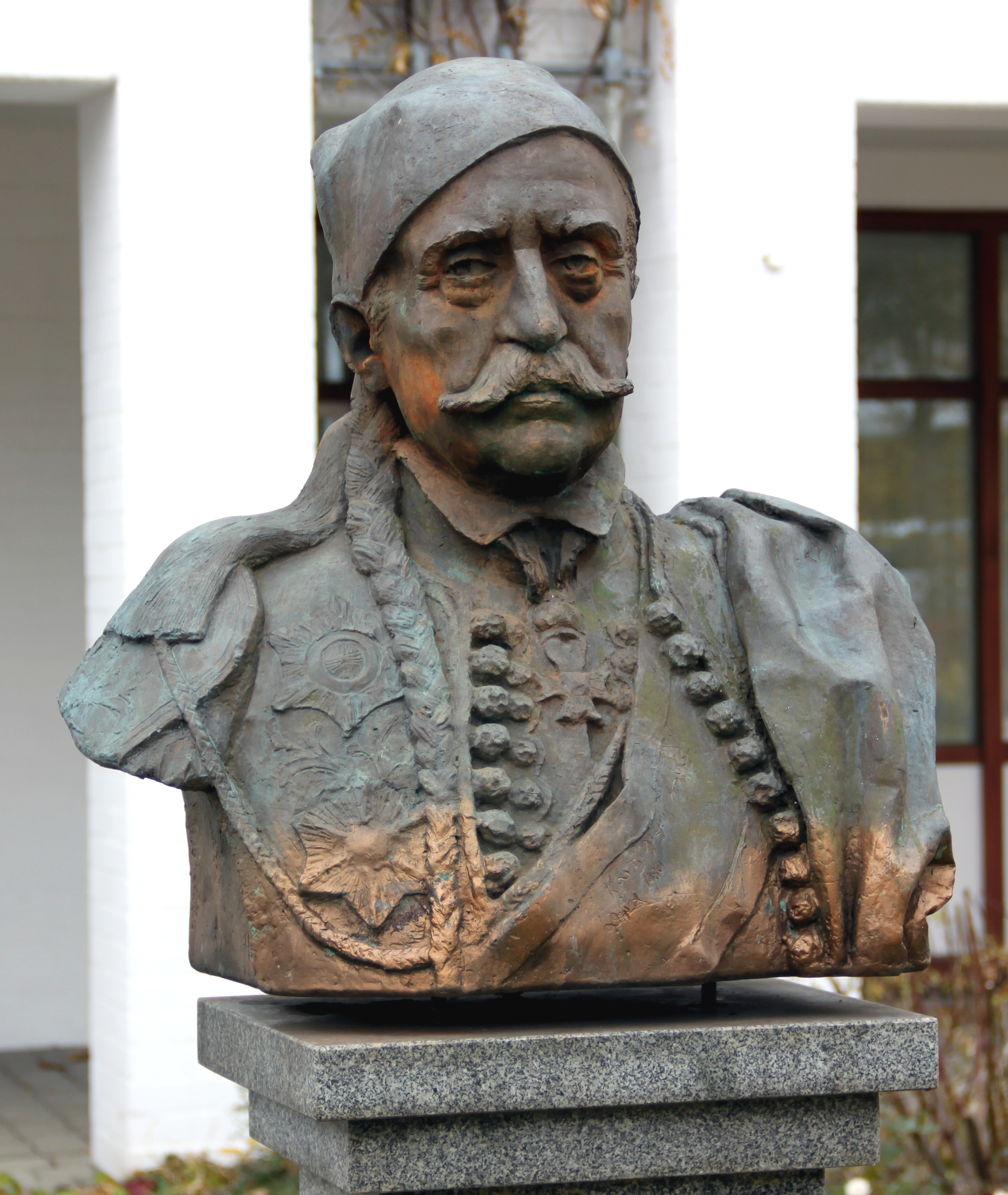
Plapoutas bust in Ottobrunn, Germany
