= Raffaele Andreassi =

Italian film director (1924-2008)

Raffaele Andreassi (L'Aquila, 2 August 1924 - 20 November 2008) was an Italian film director most known for his movie Flashback from 1969. The movie is about a soldier in World War II and received many awards. It was entered into the 1969 Cannes Film Festival and nominated for the Golden Palm. Andreassi also did many documentaries during his director career.

== Career ==
Andreassi began his career as a journalist in the late 1940s. He wrote in numerous magazines and newspapers, including the morning paper Giornale di Sicilia. Andreassi also published several collections of poems. He then devoted himself to writing screenplays for film, especially documentaries. His directorial debut was in 1955 with a comedy "Face rogue" in collaboration with Lance Comfort. In 1960 Andreassi received the Silver Berlin Bear for his short film "I vecchi".

In 1968 he directed "Flashback", a war movie that has received the following awards: Golden Globe's Foreign Press, Grolla Silver premium (St. Vincent), Award of Tourism and Entertainment, Silverstar Festival San Francisco. The film was shown at Cannes where it was nominated for the Golden Palm and received standing ovations.

After Flashback Andreassi collaborated with the most important sections of the RAI. From 1971 to 1975 he was artistic director of the Audiovisual Mondadori. From 1982 to 1983 he taught "techniques of documentary film" at DAMS in Bologna. In 1999 he wrote and directed the documentary "The wolves inside" with non-professional actors, a journey of the author himself in space and time. Andreassi died on 20 November 2008.

== Filmography ==
- I lupi dentro (2000)
- Flashback (1969)
- Uomini e cose (1968)
- Alternative attuali (1966)
- Antonio Ligabue, pittore (1965)
- Gli animali (1965)
- Il silenzio (1964)
- Amore (1963/II)
- I piaceri proibiti (1963)
- Gli stregoni (1961)
- Lo specchio, la tigre e la pianura (1961)
- I vecchi (1960)
- Bambini (1960)
- Il puledrino (1960)
- Nebbia (1960)
- Simone Martini (1958)
- Faccia da mascalzone (1956)
- Risveglio (1956)
- Gli uomini del sale (1954)
- Uomini in bilico (1954)
