= Tripotamia =

Tripotamia Τριποταμιά
- Community
- Location within Greece
- Coordinates: 37°37′N 21°48′E
- Country: Greece
- Administrative region: Peloponnese
- Regional unit: Arcadia
- Municipality: Gortynia
- Municipal unit: Tropaia
- Elevation: 160 m (520 ft)

Population (2021)
  - Community: 130
- Time zone: UTC+2 (EET)
  - Summer (DST): UTC+3 (EEST)
- Postal code: 220 08
- Area code: 27970

Tripotamia (Greek: Τριποταμιά meaning "three rivers", before 1927: Μπέλεσι - Belesi) is a village and a community in the municipal unit of Tropaia in the westernmost part of Arcadia, Peloponnese, Greece. It is situated on a hill above the left bank of the river Erymanthos, 3 km north of its confluence with the Alfeios. The Ladon, another tributary of the Alfeios, flows 2 km east of Tripotamia. The rivers Erymanthos and Alfeios form the border with Elis here. The community consists of the villages Tripotamia, Kapellitsa and Chania. The Greek National Road 74 (Pyrgos - Olympia - Tripoli) passes north of the village. Tripotamia is 2 km east of Aspra Spitia, 6 km southwest of Liodora and 15 km east of Olympia.

== Historical population ==
Year	Population
1981	431
1991	420
2001	323
2011	200
2021	130

== See also ==
- List of settlements in Arcadia
