= Flashback (1969 film) =

1969 film

- Film poster
- Directed by: Raffaele Andreassi
- Written by: Raffaele Andreassi; Maurizio Barendson; Callisto Cosulich; Nelo Risi
- Produced by: Franco Clementi
- Starring: Fred Robsahm
- Cinematography: Raffaele Andreassi
- Music by: Bruno Nicolai
- Release date: 1969
- Running time: 106 minutes
- Country: Italy
- Language: Italian

Flashback is a 1969 Italian drama film directed by Raffaele Andreassi. The film received many awards; Globo d'oro, Grolla Silver premium (Saint Vincent), Award of Tourism & Entertainment and Silverstar Festival San Francisco. It was entered into the 1969 Cannes Film Festival and was nominated for the Golden Palm. At the festival the film received standing ovations.

== Plot ==
In September 1944, Heinz Prulier (Fred Robsahm) is a German soldier stationed as a sniper overlooking his own army from a tree. When he falls asleep, his troops are gone and he is left alone to defend the incoming enemy invasion. Flashbacks recall his wartime experiences and his transition from a human being into a sadistic murderer and rapist. He encounters a prostitute and a giggling girl in this violent feature that reveals the deterioration of human values in the face of the grim realities of war.

== Cast ==
- Fred Robsahm
- Pilar Castel
- Dada Gallotti
- Sandra Dal Sasso
- Gianni Cavina
- Antonietta Fiorito
- Pietro Bonfiglioli
- Gabriele Fornacioni
- Vittorio Gobbi

== Awards ==
- Golden Globe's Foreign Press
- Grolla Silver premium (St. Vincent)
- Award of Tourism and Entertainment
- Silverstar Festival San Francisco
