= The Illiac Passion =

- Directed by: Gregory Markopoulos
- Based on: Prometheus Bound by Aeschylus
- Release date: 1967
- Running time: 90 minutes
- Country: United States
- Language: English

The Illiac Passion is a 1967 American avant-garde film directed by Gregory Markopoulos.

== Production ==
Jerome Hiler was an assistant on The Illiac Passion, working on costumes and scouting locations. Working titles for the film were Prometheus Bound, Himself as Himself, and Eternity. The soundtrack is based on a recording of Markopoulos reading Henry David Thoreau's translation of Prometheus Bound. Markopoulos edited the film in 1965. The intricate arrangement of brief shots raised the cost of printing the film considerably, which delayed the film's release as he raised additional funds.

== Release ==
The Illiac Passion screened at the fourth Knokke-Le-Zoute Experimental Film Festival in 1967. The festival jury made the controversial decision not to consider The Illiac Passion for any prizes, since Markopoulos had previously won for Twice a Man. In the United States, the film opened at the Film-Maker's Cinematheque in April 1968. A planned 1980 screening at the National Gallery of Athens was cancelled out of concern that the film contained nudity. The Illiac Passion is now part of Anthology Film Archives' Essential Cinema Repertory collection.

== Bibliography ==
- Balsom, Erika (2017). After Uniqueness: A History of Film and Video Art in Circulation. Columbia University Press. ISBN 978-0-231-17692-7.
- MacDonald, Scott (2006). A Critical Cinema 5: Interviews with Independent Filmmakers. University of California Press. ISBN 978-0-520-93908-0.
- Michelakis, Pantelis (2013). Greek Tragedy on Screen. Oxford University Press. ISBN 978-0-19-923907-8.
