= Marjorie Keller =

American experimental filmmaker

Marjorie Keller (1950–1994) was an experimental filmmaker, author, activist, film scholar. J. Hoberman called her "an unselfish champion of the avant-garde."

== Early life and education ==
Keller was born in 1950 in Yorktown, New York. The youngest of seven children, Keller grew up in a large, upper-middle-class, Protestant family. As a girl, Keller's mother schooled her in the feminine arts of cooking, gardening and entertaining.

Keller never gave up these skills (she even used them as inspiration for her films), even though other feminists of her time frowned upon such domestic jobs. B. Ruby Rich (a friend, former lover of Keller's and another important member of the feminist film movement), fondly remembers a Passover dinner that Keller made in this passage from her memoir:

"And the food was great, because Margie was already a fabulous cook: for a rebel girl of that era, she was remarkably versed in the female arts."

Keller first attended Tufts University, but finished her coursework at the School of the Art Institute of Chicago after getting expelled from Tufts for participating in a protest in 1972. She then went on to pursue her master's degree and then her doctorate in Cinema Studies at New York University in 1975. During her years at Tufts and the Art Institute of Chicago, Keller was instructed by American avant-garde filmmaker Stan Brakhage and colleague of Saul Levine, Ruby Rich and Diego Cortez.

== Politics ==
Marjorie Keller was deeply entrenched in the politics of her generation. She was arrested for participating in a protest at the White House against Nixon's price control policies, and she actively demonstrated at the Republican National Convention in 1972. Keller openly supported the issues of welfare reform, labor union rights, and AIDS awareness throughout her life. Although politically active, she only made one expressly political film, Hell No: No Cuts!, which dealt with racism and the welfare system.

== Feminism in relation to Keller and her films ==
At the time Keller was making her films, the feminist movement of the 1960s and 70's was in full swing. As a result of this movement, feminist film theory was applied to a majority of films made by women in that era. Keller openly rejected the structural rules and regulations based on feminist film theory. In a review of E. Ann Kaplan's 1983 book Women and Film Keller stated that theory "obfuscates women's film making in the name of feminism." Keller refused to work within the confines set up by film theorists, many of whom had never made a film themselves.

== Filmography ==
Marjorie Keller's work exists in the experimental realm of the lyrical and the "diary" film styles pioneered by Stan Brakhage, Gregory Markopoulos, and Marie Menken (all of whom are cited as being big influences. In her films, Keller used themes and images from her own life and experiences. She explored what it was like to be a feminist in the latter half of the twentieth century, in her own way. Children were also an inspiration to her. This can be seen in both her films and her writings.

Marjorie Keller made over twenty-five films in her brief lifetime.

Hell No: No Cuts!, ca. 1972 (25 min.): silent, black and white; 8 mm

Backsection, ca. 1972 (4.5 min.): silent, black and white; 8 mm

History of Art 3939, ca. 1972 (2.5 min.): silent, color; 8 mm

Turtle, ca. 1972 (2.5 min.): silent, color; 8 mm

Untitled, ca. 1972 (7.5 min.): silent, black and white; 8 mm

Pieces of Eight, 1973 (3 min.): silent, black and white; 8 mm

Duck Fuck/Rube in Galena, 1973 (4 min.): silent, color; 16 mm

Swept, 1973 (3 min.): silent, color; 16 mm

The Outer Circle, 1973 (6.75 min.): sound, color; 16 mm

She/Va, 1973 (3 min.): silent, color; 16 mm

Objection, 1974 (18.25 min.): sound, color; 16 mm

Film Notebook: Part 1, 1975 (12.25 min.): silent, color; 8 mm

Superimposition (1), 1975 (14.75 min.): silent, color; 16 mm

By Two's & Three's: Women, 1976 (7 min.): silent, color; 8 mm

Film Notebook: 1969-76; Part 2, Some of Us in the Mechanical Age, 1977 (27 min.): silent, color; 8 mm

Misconception, 1977 (43 min.): sound, color; 16 mm

The Web, 1977 (10 min.): silent, color; 8 mm

On the Verge of an Image of Christmas, 1978 (10.5 min.): silent, color; 8 mm

Ancient Parts/Foreign Parts, 1979 (6 min.): silent, color; 16 mm

Six Windows, 1979 (7 min.): sound, color; 16 mm

Daughters of Chaos, 1980 (20 min.): sound, color; 16 mm

The Fallen World, 1983 (9.5 min.): sound, black and white, color; 16 mm

Lyrics, 1983 (9 min.): sound, color; Super 8

The Answering Furrow, 1985 (27 min.): sound, color; 16 mm

Private Parts, 1988 (12.75 min.): silent, color; 16 mm

Herein, 1991 (35 min.): sound, color; 16 mm

Part IV: Green Hill, ca. 1993 (3 min.): sound, color; 8 mm

ABC, 1993 (1.5 min): video

== Writings ==
Keller's dissertation, The Untutored Eye: Childhood in the Films of Cocteau, Cornell and Brakhage was published in 1986. She also published a children's pop-up book that she wrote and illustrated herself titled The Moon on the Porch. At the time of her death, she was working on a book about women experimental filmmakers, which was never completed.

== Other work ==
In addition to being a filmmaker, author, activist, and scholar, Keller also served on the board of directors of the Collective for Living Cinema and was the founding editor of their journal, Motion Picture from 1984 to 1987. She was also the head of The Film-Makers' Cooperative in New York for a period of time in the late 1980s, and was a professor of film making and film history at the University of Rhode Island.
