= Aspra Spitia, Elis =

Aspra Spitia Άσπρα Σπίτια
- Community
- Location within Greece
- Coordinates: 37°37′N 21°47′E
- Country: Greece
- Administrative region: West Greece
- Regional unit: Elis
- Municipality: Archaia Olympia
- Municipal unit: Archaia Olympia

Population (2021)
  - Community: 148
- Time zone: UTC+2 (EET)
  - Summer (DST): UTC+3 (EEST)

Aspra Spitia (Greek: Άσπρα Σπίτια) is a village in the municipality Olympia, eastern Elis, Greece. It is situated between the rivers Alfeios and Erymanthos, 4 km northwest of their confluence. It is 2 km west of Tripotamia (Arcadia), 4 km southeast of Vasilaki, 14 km east of Olympia and 30 km east of Pyrgos. Near the village, archeologists have excavated remains of housing from the Neolithic period. The village was affected by the 2007 Greek forest fires.

== Population ==
Year	Village population
1981	385
1991	313
2001	316
2011	195
2021	148

== See also ==
- List of settlements in Elis
