= Iraia =

Iraia Ηραία
- Municipal unit
- Location within the regional unit

- Location within Greece
- Coordinates: 37°37′N 21°57′E
- Country: Greece
- Administrative region: Peloponnese
- Regional unit: Arcadia
- Municipality: Gortynia

Area
  - Municipal unit: 144.0 km^{2} (55.6 sq mi)

Population (2021)
  - Municipal unit: 960
  - Municipal unit density: 6.7/km^{2} (17/sq mi)
- Time zone: UTC+2 (EET)
  - Summer (DST): UTC+3 (EEST)
- Vehicle registration: TP

Iraia (Greek: Ηραία) is a former municipality in Arcadia, Peloponnese, Greece. Since the 2011 local government reform it became a municipal unit of the municipality of Gortynia. The municipal unit has an area of 144.002 km^{2}. Its population is 960, according to the 2021 census. The seat of the municipality was in Paloumpa. The municipality is named after the ancient Arcadian city of Heraia. The region was known in recent times for the construction workers (mastori) who came from the villages of Servos and Lyssarea. Pausanias describes the ancient cities of Heraia and Melaineai and their buildings. An excavation near Lyssarea uncovered buildings, mosaics, as well as gold and silver coins.

== Subdivisions ==
The municipal unit of Iraia consists of 17 communities:

- Agios Ioannis
- Arachova
- Chrysochori
- Kakouraiika
- Kokkinorrachi
- Kokkoras
- Liodora
- Loutra Iraias
- Lykouresis
- Lyssarea
- Ochthia
- Paloumpa
- Psari
- Pyrris
- Raftis
- Sarakini
- Servos

== Notable people ==
The village of Loutra Iraias is the birthplace of the film-maker Constantinos Gavras (Costa-Gavras).
