= Paloumpa =

Paloumpa Παλούμπα
- Community
- Location within Greece
- Coordinates: 37°37′N 21°57′E
- Country: Greece
- Administrative region: Peloponnese
- Regional unit: Arcadia
- Municipality: Gortynia
- Municipal unit: Iraia

Population (2021)
  - Community: 30
- Time zone: UTC+2 (EET)
  - Summer (DST): UTC+3 (EEST)

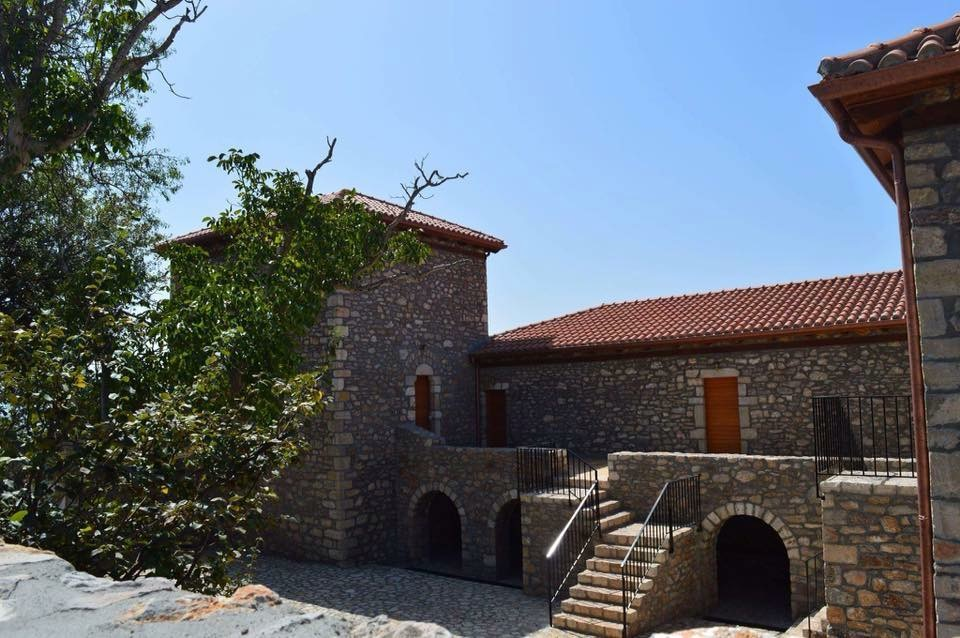
Plapoutas Tower in Greece

Paloumpa (Greek: Παλούμπα, also Palouba) is a town in Arcadia, southern Greece. It is situated on a mountain slope overlooking the valley of the river Alfeios. It was the seat of the former municipality of Iraia. The town is in a remote area, but contains a post office and a KEP - Centre for Serving Citizens. The inhabitants are mainly concerned with animal husbandry. Paloumpa is 4 km southeast of Lyssarea and 9 km northwest of Dimitsana.

== Landmarks ==
The town was almost completely leveled in an earthquake in the 1960s and as a result contains very little architecture from before this period.

=== Church of Saint George ===
The church was built in the nineteenth century on a basic basilica groundplan in a central location within the town. It is dedicated to Saint George, but celebrates on the Dormition of the Virgin. In 2004 a fire which was most likely caused by an unattended oil-lamp gutted the church destroying the exquisitely worked carved wooden iconostasis which had been granted as a gift by King Ludwig I of Bavaria, father of King Otto the first King of the newly established Independent Greek State. Work has commenced under the supervision of the local Ephorate of Byzantine Antiquities to repair the damage and re-roof the structure.

=== Church of Saint Panteleimon ===
The church is on the western edge of the town and is used as a cemetery church.

=== Church of Saint Paraskevi ===
The church is on the hill overlooking the town near a spring.

=== House of Dimitris Plapoutas ===
The House of the Revolutionary hero Dimitris Plapoutas is very centrally located in the town. Once known as "ο πύργος" (The Tower) because it was the biggest house in the town, the house used to be a tri-level mansion with stables. The upper two levels were destroyed in a 1960s earthquake.

== Famous inhabitants ==
- Dimitris Plapoutas (1786-1864) general and politician
- Liakos Liakopoulos
- Panourgias Eliopoulos
