= Toccata (film) =

- Directed by: Herman van der Horst
- Release date: 1969
- Country: Netherlands
- Language: Dutch

Toccata (film) is a 1969 Dutch film directed by Herman van der Horst.

== Cast ==
- Feike Asma
- Dolph de Lange
