= James Notopoulos =

Greek American scholar

- Born: James Anastasios Notopoulos; July 4, 1905; Altoona, Pennsylvania
- Died: October 17, 1967 (aged 62); West Hartford, Connecticut
- Occupation: Classical antiquity scholar
- Years active: 1936–1967
- Known for: Homerist
- Spouse: Jean McKerihan (m. 1934)
- Children: 2

Academic background
- Education: Mercersburg Academy
- Alma mater: Amherst College (BA); Jesus College, Oxford (MA)

Academic work
- Institutions: Trinity College, Connecticut; Columbia University, NY
- Main interests: Homer, Plato, Greek and Cypriot folk songs

James Anastasios Notopoulos (July 4, 1905, Altoona, Pennsylvania – October 17, 1967, West Hartford, Connecticut) was a Greek-American scholar of classical antiquity and a Homerist in particular. He also recorded and published folk songs from Greece and Cyprus.

== Early life and education ==
Notopoulos's parents were from Greece and emigrated to the United States in the early 20th century. His father was Anastasios Nicholas Notopoulos (Greek: Αναστάσιος Νικόλας Νοτόπουλος), born in the 19th century in Tripoli, died in May 1960, in Pinellas, Florida. His mother was Helen Ververis, born in Greece. They were married on August 29, 1903, in Tripoli, and had seven children. James Notopoulos was a student at Mercersburg Academy, graduating in 1924. Then he attained a bachelor of arts degree in 1928 from Amherst College, and an master of arts in 1934 from Jesus College, Oxford.

== Career ==
=== Academic career ===
After non-academic work as a district manager for Penware, Pennler & Alpenn Theatres Corporation in western Pennsylvania, 1933–1936, Notopoulos became an instructor in Greek at Trinity College in Hartford, Connecticut (1936–1938), then assistant professor of classics (1938–1946), and then Hobart Professor of Classical Languages (from 1946) at the same institution. In the interim, he was also briefly a visiting assistant professor of classics at Wesleyan University in Middletown, Connecticut (1938–1939). During a 1952–1952 fieldwork period, he was a visiting professor at the American School of Classical Studies at Athens, Greece. In 1955, back in the US, he became a member of the Latin committee of the College Board Entrance Exams; and for Columbia University in New York City he was a university seminar associate for classical civilization, from 1959.

Notopoulos is best known for his studies of Plato's influence on Shelley, and of Homer as an oral poet. One of his major works is The Platonism of Shelley. Notopoulos went on to write essays on classical influences on Byron, Keats, Emerson, Yeats, T. E. Lawrence, and Nikos Kazantzakis. He was also interested in Greek epigraphy, to which he had been introduced by Tod of Oxford and Ferguson of Harvard. Continuing the work of Ferguson, who had discovered that the twelve Athenian tribes had provided secretaries for the government of Athens in regular and predictable cycles down to the time of Sulla in the first century BC, Notopoulos showed that this practice continued into the third century AD. He thus provided the framework for re-dating many official inscriptions and for establishing the chronology of Athens under the Roman Empire.

Notopoulos's third major interest was in continuing the work of Milman Parry and Albert Lord in viewing Homer as a poet of an oral tradition. He started examining modern Greek oral tradition, his first publication being on the Cretan folk song about Daskalogiannis.

=== Recordings of folk songs in Greece and Cyprus ===
In September 1952, Notopoulos traveled to Greece with funding from the Guggenheim Foundation and the American Philosophical Society to make audio recordings of traditional Greek music and oral poetry. He aimed at creating a similar study to the groundbreaking work of Milman Parry and Albert Lord in the southern Balkans. During his research, he was based in the American School of Classical Studies at Athens, where he was serving as visiting professor and from which he embarked on field trips until August 1953.

He recorded singers, oral poets, instrumentalists, and storytellers in villages and towns across mainland Greece, the islands of Crete and Naxos, and Cyprus. In total, he gathered 645 performances, roughly 90 hours of vocal and instrumental music, on 157 double-sided reel-to-reel tapes. Additionally, he recorded nearly an hour of color and black and white films, and several hundred color photographs, that have been digitised and catalogued by the Center for Hellenic Studies between 2013 and 2018. The collection is remarkable because it spans many popular genres and regional styles of traditional and liturgical music in Greece, Notopoulos recorded multiple variations of songs from various locales and sometimes different versions of a single composition from the same performer and it has excellent audio quality. He recorded the oral epics and ballads still being sung and improvised by poets and traveling minstrels, some of which went back to the Middle Ages but some of which dealt with the Greek War of Independence in the 19th century and even the Nazi invasion of Crete during the World War II. Many of the songs use centuries-old musical and poetic techniques to narrate modern occurrences such as the Italian invasion, Nazi occupation, and other events of World War II.

The result of this study was the recording of more than 1,500 folk songs and ballads on tape, which were copied and deposited in the Library of Congress and excerpts of which were embodied in the C. N. Jackson Lectures delivered at Harvard in 1962 and published in a lengthy article, "Studies in Early Greek Oral Poetry". Notopoulos's original recordings and slides, as well as his unfinished book on oral literature in Greece, were given to Harvard after his death and are stored there in the Milman Parry Collection of Oral Literature. These recordings were later issued on Moe Asch's Folkways label. While at the Library of Congress (American Folklife Center, Archive of Folk Culture), AFS 10,943-10,967, there are twenty-five tapes of Greek heroic poetry, folk tales, and folk songs collected by Notopoulos, 1952–1953.

In 1967, Notopoulos published the book Homer and the Contemporary Heroic Oral Poetry: A Study of Comparative Oral Literature, which contributed greatly to the subject of comparative studies between Homeric and Modern Greek literature.

After his death in 1967, Notopoulos's widow donated his archive to Harvard. The James A. Notopoulos Collection of Modern Greek Ballads and Songs is part of the Milman Parry Collection of Oral Literature. The James A. Notopoulos Collection (approximately 50 reel-to-reel audio tapes) is at Harvard University's Widener Library.

== Personal life ==
He married Jean McKerihan on May 1, 1934. McKerihan was born on May 12, 1909, in the state of Pennsylvania, and died on May 29, 1999, in Farmington, Hartford, Connecticut, at the age of 90. They had two sons. Notopoulos died on 17 October 1967 at the age of 62.

== Publications ==
- The Divided Line of the Platonic Tradition. The Journal of Philosophy, 32 (1935) 57- 66.
- Movement in the Divided Line of Plato’s Republic. Harvard Studies in Classical Phi lology, 47 (1936) 57-63.
- "Mnemosyne in Oral Literature". Transactions and Proceedings of the American Philological Association, 69, 465–493, DOI: 10.2307/283194 (1938)
- The Name of Plato. Classical Philology, 34 (1939) 284-293.
- Porphyry’s Life of Plato. Classical Philology 35 (1940) 135-145.
- Agamemnon 445-447. The Classical Journal 36 (1940) 167-168.
- "The Slaves at the Battle of Marathon". The American Journal of Philology, 62 (3), 352–354, DOI: 10.2307/291670 (1941)
- Plato’s Epitaph. American Journal of Philology, 63 (1942) 272-293.
- Socrates and the Sun. The Classical Journal, il (1942) 260-274.
- Ferguson’s Law in Athens under the Empire.Transactions of the American Philological Association, 64 (1943) 44-65.
- "The Symbolism of the Sun and Light in the Republic of Plato, II". Classical Philology, 39 (4), 163–172 and 223–240 (1944)
- The Date of the Creation of Hadrianis. Transactions of the American Philological As sociation, 77 (1946) 53-56.
- Notes on Athenian Inscriptions of the Empire Period. American Journal ofPhilology, 69 (1948) 515-519.
- Parataxis in Homer: A New Approach to Homeric Literary Criticism. Transactions oftheAmericanPhilologicalAssociation,80(1949)1-23.
- "The Generic and Oral Composition in Homer". Transactions and Proceedings of the American Philological Association, 81, 28–36. DOI: 10.2307/283566 (1950)
- Epigraphical Notes, Hesperia 20 (1951) 64-66.
- Composition by Theme in Homer and in the South-slavic Epos. Ibidem 62 70–80 (1951)
- "The Warrior as an Oral Poet: A Case History". The Classical Weekly, 46 (2), 17–19 DOI: 10.2307/4343240 (1952)
- "Homer and Cretan Heroic Poetry: A Study in Comparative Oral Poetry I. The Song of Daskaloyannes". The American Journal of Philology, 73 (3), 225–250. DOI: 10.2307/292135 (1952)
- Yearbook of the American Philosophical Society 1953, 249-253.
- "The Introduction of Alphabet into Oral Societies". Προσφορά είς Στίλβωνα ΚνριακΙδην, Thessaloniki, 516–524 (1953)
- "New Sources on Lord Byron at Missolonghi". Keats-Shelley Journal, 4, 31–45 (1955)
- "Homeric Similes in the Light of Oral Poetry". The Classical Journal, 52(7), 323–328 (1957)
- "Homer and Geometric Ant. A Comparative Study in the Formulaic Technique of Composition". Άθηνά 61, 65–93. (1957)
- "Byzantium in the Thought and Poetry of William Butler Keats". Πεπραγμένα Θ' Διεθνούς Βνζαντινολογικοϋ Συνεδρίου, 3, Thessaloniki, 188–199. (1958)
- "Homer, Hesiod and the Achaean Heritage of Oral Poetry". Hesperia: The Journal of the American School of Classical Studies at Athens, 29(2), 177–197. DOI: 10.2307/147293 (1960)
- "The Genesis of an Oral Heroic Poem". Greek, Roman and Byzantine Studies, 3(2/3), 135–144. (1960).
- "Folk dances of Greece" in the: Collection of Pamphlets on Folk Dances and Songs. Folkways Records and Service Corporation (1961)
- "The Homeric Hymns as Oral Poetry; A Study of the Post-Homeric Oral Tradition". The American Journal of Philology, 83 (4), 337–368. DOI: 10.2307/292918 (1962)
- "Akritan Ikonography on Byzantine Pottery". Hesperia: The Journal of the American School of Classical Studies at Athens, 33 (2), 108–133, DOI: 10.2307/147182 (1964)
- "Studies in Early Greek Oral Poetry". Harvard Studies in Classical Philology, 68, 1–77, DOI: 10.2307/310798 (1964)
- "'Truth-Beauty' in the 'Ode on a Grecian Urn' and the Elgin Marbles". The Modern Language Review, 61 (2), 180–182, DOI: 10.2307/3720744 (1966)
- Homer and the Contemporary Heroic Oral Poetry: A Study of Comparative Oral Literature (1967)
- The Platonism of Shelley: A Study of Platonism and the Poetic Mind (1969)

=== Discography ===
All released by Folkways Records of New York City:

- Folk Music of Greece (FE 4454; previously released as P 454) (1955)
- Folk Dances of Greece (FE 4467) (1956)
- Modern Greek Heroic Oral Poetry (FE 4468) (1959)
