= P. Adams Sitney =

American film historian (1944–2025)

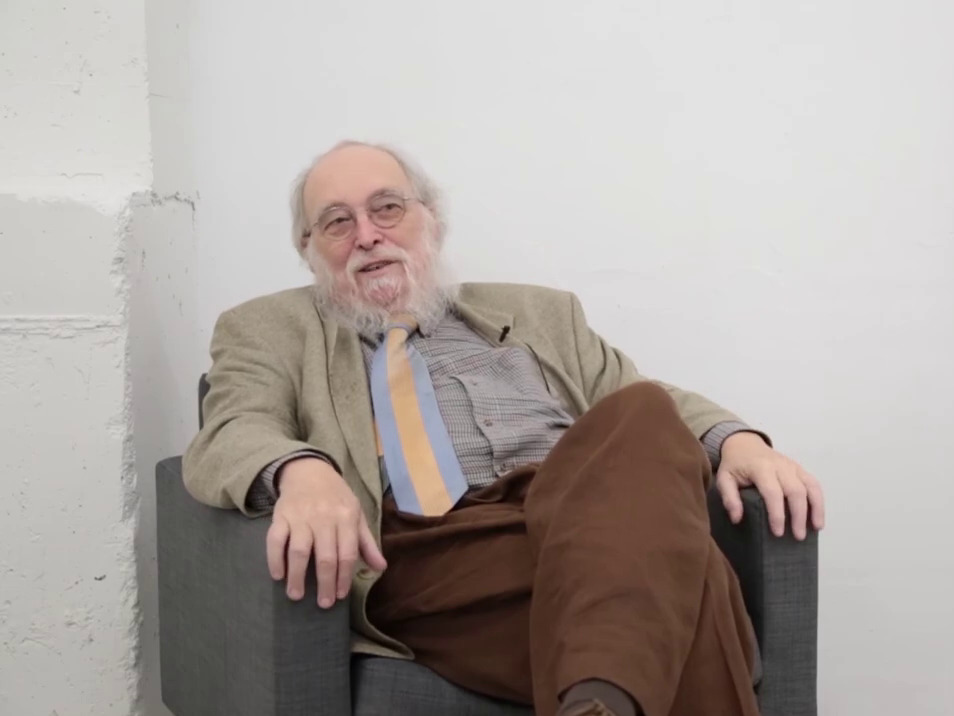
- Sitney in 2018
- Born: August 9, 1944; New Haven, Connecticut, U.S.
- Died: June 8, 2025 (aged 80); South Kingstown, Rhode Island, U.S.
- Occupation: Film historian
- Known for: Co-founder of Anthology Film Archives; Author of Visionary Film (1974)
- Spouses: Julie Adams; Marjorie Keller (died 1994)
- Children: 4

Academic background
- Education: Yale University (A.B., Ph.D.)

Academic work
- Discipline: American avant-garde cinema
- Institutions: New York University; Cooper Union; Princeton University

Paul Adams Sitney (August 9, 1944 – June 8, 2025) was a historian of American avant-garde cinema. His 1974 book Visionary Film was one of the first to chronicle the history of experimental film in the United States.

== Early life and education ==
Paul Adams Sitney was born on August 9, 1944, in New Haven, Connecticut. In a later interview, he described his family as poor; his father ran a small grocery store in downtown New Haven. Sitney said he attended a "ghetto grammar school" where he learned to become "street smart" and developed strong self-confidence.

At age 14, he wandered into a screening of a surrealist film that would set the course of his life: the 1929 Luis Buñuel–Salvador Dalí collaboration, Un Chien Andalou. He soon became involved in many film-related activities. He formed a film society (showing avant-garde classics at the local YMCA) and published the newsletter Filmwise. He managed to recruit Anaïs Nin to contribute articles, and Jean Cocteau to draw cover art. At age 16, he met filmmaker Stan Brakhage, and arranged a screening of his experimental films. Brakhage then sent a sampling of his writings to Sitney, who featured them in an expanded Filmwise issue. The success of Filmwise led to Sitney being asked to write critical commentary for other film publications. At age 17 he was invited to join the editorial staff of Film Culture magazine. He was meanwhile working as a lab assistant at the Yale Medical Center, and also frequenting Yale University's Sterling Memorial Library to read about film.

He traveled to Europe and Buenos Aires with programs of experimental films, "screening and watching them again and again, taking notes, and gathering documentation." He originally attended Trinity College under a full scholarship, where he studied Greek with Professor James Notopoulos. After Sitney's parents divorced and Notopoulos fell ill, Sitney left Trinity and took a year off, during which he lectured in Europe on experimental cinema. He then transferred to Yale University, receiving an A.B. in Greek and Sanskrit in 1967. While at the university, he avoided the Vietnam War draft with the help of a professor. Sitney later returned to Yale to earn a Ph.D. in comparative literature in 1980.

== Career ==
Sitney co-founded in 1970 the Anthology Film Archives on New York City's Lower East Side. It sought to become the world's first "museum of film" that offered repeated screenings of what it deemed noteworthy works. Sitney initially held the post of general director, although he soon found himself ill-suited for its administrative duties, and instead took the role of director of library and publications. He was on the selection committee that chose 330 films to be in the Archives' "Essential Cinema Repertory". He later edited a volume of essays on the selected films, The Essential Cinema (1975).

After editing a series of monographs on individual filmmakers, Sitney published his first major work of scholarship in 1974, Visionary Film: The American Avant Garde. It has been praised as "a brilliant analysis of the groundbreaking films at the heart of the experimental film movement". The book provided an intellectual rigor in its categorization of avant-garde films into genres and subgenres. He went on to write and edit several other books on experimental film theory and film artists.

Sitney worked during the early 1970s with Jonas Mekas, Barbara Rubin, and David Brooks to establish a filmmakers' movement known as the New American Cinema. Sitney was an intellectual leader of the movement. One of his theoretical contributions was to identify four main techniques of structural film: fixed camera position; "flicker" effect; re-photography off the screen; and loop printing. These techniques were implemented by experimental filmmakers in the 1960s to create cinema "in which the shape of the whole film is pre-determined and simplified".

In his academic career, Sitney was Professor of Visual Arts at the Lewis Center for the Arts at Princeton University. Prior to joining Princeton, he taught at the Cooper Union for the Advancement of Science and Art, as well as at Yale, NYU, and Bard College. Despite his many years as a university professor, Sitney could be critical of academia for stifling creativity and experimental art, for example, he once called Princeton "the great enemy of poetry" because "it turns poetry into homework".

Sitney appeared in Jonas Mekas's film Notes for Jerome (1978).

== Personal life and death ==
Sitney was Roman Catholic and a conscientious objector to the Vietnam War. He was married twice; he had two children with his first wife, Julie Adams, and two with his second wife, Marjorie Keller. Sky Sitney, the co-founder of the documentary film festival DC/DOX and a film professor at Georgetown University, was his daughter.

On June 8, 2025, Sitney died of advanced metastatic cancer at his home in Matunuck, in South Kingstown, Rhode Island. He was 80 years old.

== Bibliography ==
=== Author ===
- Visionary Film: The American Avant Garde (PDF). Oxford University Press. 1974. ISBN 978-0195017618. Subsequent editions published in 1980 and 2002.
- Ernie Gehr. Minneapolis: Walker Art Center. 1980. OCLC 9103172.
- Modernist Montage: The Obscurity of Vision in Cinema and Literature. Social Foundations of Aesthetic Forms. Columbia University Press. 1990. ISBN 978-0231071826.
- Vital Crises in Italian Cinema: Iconography, Stylistics, Politics. University of Texas Press. 1995. ISBN 978-0292776876.
- Eyes Upside Down: Visionary Filmmakers and the Heritage of Emerson. Oxford University Press. 2008. ISBN 978-0195331141.
- The Cinema of Poetry. Oxford University Press. 2014. ISBN 978-0199337026.
- Marvelous Names in Literature and Cinema. Crescent Moon Publishing. 2025. ISBN 978-1861719317.

=== Editor ===
- Maya Deren. Filmwise. New Haven: Cinema 16. 1960. OCLC 982198066.
- Stan Brakhage. Filmwise. New Haven: New Haven Film Society. 1961. OCLC 48711686.
- Gregory J. Markopoulos. Filmwise. Hartford: Cinema 16 and the Film-makers Cooperative. 1964. OCLC 48711687.
- Marie Menken; Willard Maas. Filmwise. New Haven: Film-makers Cinematheque. 1967. OCLC 48711688.
- Film Culture Reader (PDF). Praeger Publishers. 1970. LCCN 70099814. Anthology of Film Culture magazine articles; this book was reissued in 2000 by Cooper Square Press.
- The Essential Cinema: Essays on Films in the Collection of Anthology Film Archives. New York University Press. 1975. ISBN 978-0814777688.
- Larry Jordan Retrospective. New York: Anthology Film Archives. 1976. OCLC 9134900.
- Avant-Garde Film: A Reader of Theory and Criticism. New York University Press. 1978. ISBN 978-0814777930.
- The Gaze of Orpheus. Barrytown, New York: Station Hill Press. 1981. ISBN 978-0930794378. Anthology of literary essays by Maurice Blanchot.
- Metaphors on Vision (PDF). New York: Anthology Film Archives. 2017. ISBN 978-0997910209. Stan Brakhage writings first published in 1963 in a special issue of Film Culture.

== See also ==
- Cinephilia
- List of American independent films
- Marjorie Keller
