= Lyssarea =

Lyssarea Λυσσαρέα
- Community
- Location within Greece
- Coordinates: 37°39′N 21°56′E
- Country: Greece
- Administrative region: Peloponnese
- Regional unit: Arcadia
- Municipality: Gortynia
- Municipal unit: Iraia
- Elevation: 700 m (2,300 ft)

Population (2021)
  - Community: 25
- Time zone: UTC+2 (EET)
  - Summer (DST): UTC+3 (EEST)
- Postal code: 220 28
- Area code: 27950

Lyssarea (Greek: Λυσσαρέα; before 1927: Μπουγιάτι Bougiati) is a village in Southwestern Arcadia, Greece. It is part of the municipal unit of Iraia. It is built on the slopes of two hills called Agios Lias and Skylaras and appears amphitheatric with its old stone houses and tile roofs. The oldest dated house in Lyssarea was built in 1787. The majority of old inhabitants were builders (Greek χτιστάδες/μαστόροι). It is 4 km northwest of Paloumpa, 4 km south of Kalliani and 12 km northwest of Dimitsana.

== Population ==
Historical population
Year	Pop.	±%
1981	130	—
1991	227	+74.6%
2001	115	−49.3%
2011	68	−40.9%
2021	25	−63.2%
