= Robert Beavers =

American filmmaker (born 1949)

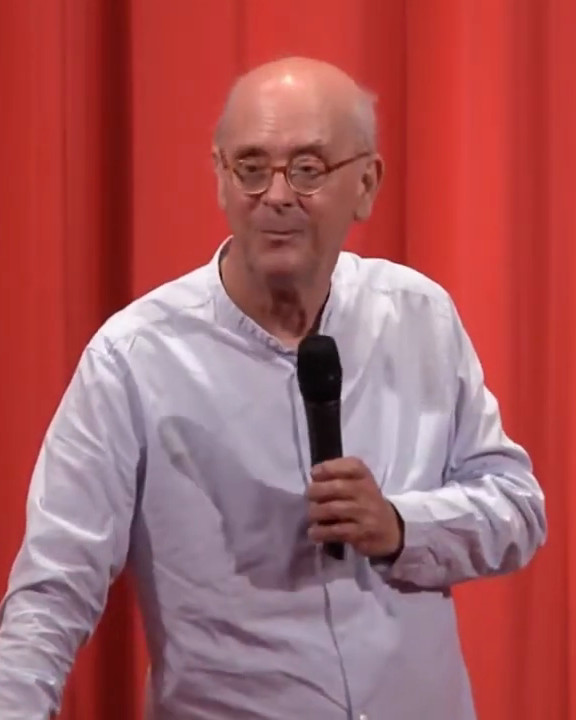
- Robert Beavers in 2019
- Born: February 10, 1949; Brookline, Massachusetts, U.S.
- Education: Deerfield Academy (dropped out)
- Occupation: Filmmaker
- Notable work: My Hand Outstretched to the Winged Distance and Sightless Measure
- Partner: Gregory Markopoulos (1966–1992; his death)

Robert Beavers (born February 10, 1949) is an American experimental filmmaker. Born and raised in Massachusetts, he attended Deerfield Academy which he left before graduating to move to New York in 1965 to pursue filmmaking. He lived in New York until 1967 when he and his partner, Gregory Markopoulos, left the United States for Europe, where they continued to live and make films until Markopoulos's death in 1992.

Both filmmakers restricted the screenings of their films after leaving America, and instead held yearly screenings of their work from 1980 to 1986 at the Temenos, a site near Lyssaraia in Arcadia, Greece. After Markopoulos' death, Beavers founded Temenos, Inc., a non-profit devoted to the preservation of his and Markopoulos's work. Beavers has worked extensively on re-editing his films to create the larger film cycle My Hand Outstretched to the Winged Distance and Sightless Measure.

== Selected filmography ==
- Spiracle (1966)

16mm, color, sound; 12 minutes

- ~Early Monthly Segments (1968?70/2002)~

35mm, color, silent; 33 minutes

- ~Winged Dialogue (1967/2000) and
- ~Plan of Brussels (1968/2000)

35mm, color, sound; 21 minutes
The final edit combines both films on one reel

- ~The Count of Days (1969/2001)

35 mm, color, sound; 21 minutes
The final edit includes part of Early Monthly Segments on the same reel

- ~Palinode (1970/2001)

35mm, color, sound; 21 minutes
The final edit includes part of Early Monthly Segments on the same reel

- ~Diminished Frame (1970/2001)

35mm, black and white, and color, sound; 24 minutes
The final edit includes part of Early Monthly Segments on the same reel

- ~Still Light (1970/2001)

35mm, black-and-white and color, sound; 25 minutes

- ~From the Notebook of (1971/1998)

35mm, color, sound 48 minutes

- ~The Painting (1972/1999)

35mm, color, sound; 22 minutes

- ~Work Done (1972/1999)

35mm, color, sound; 22 minutes

- ~Ruskin (1975/1997)

35mm, black-and-white and color, sound; 45 minutes

- ~Sotiros (1976-78/1996)

35mm, color, sound; 25 minutes
The final edit comprises three earlier films; Sotiros Responds (1976), Sotiros (Alone) (1977), and Sotiros in the Elements (1978)

- ~AMOR (1980)

35mm, color, sound; 15 minutes

- ~Efpsychi (1983/1996)

35mm, color, sound; 20 minutes

- ~Wingseed (1985)

35mm, color, sound; 15 minutes

- ~The Hedge Theater (1986?90/2002)

35mm, color, sound; 19 minutes
Includes footage from Borromini (1986) and San Martino/Il Sassetta (1987-1990)

- ~The Stoas (1991–97)

35mm, color, sound; 22 minutes

- ~The Ground (1993–2001)

35mm, color, sound; 20 minutes

- Pitcher of Colored Light (2007)

35mm, color, sound; 24 minutes

- The Suppliant (2010)

16mm, color, sound; 5 minutes

- Listening to the Space in my Room (2013)

16mm, color, sound; 19 minutes

- Among the Eucalyptuses (2017)

16mm, color; 4 minutes

- “Der Klang, die Welt…” (2018)

16mm, color, sound; 4 minutes

- Dedication: Bernice Hodges (2024)

5 minutes

~Part of the cycle My Hand Outstretched to the Winged Distance and Sightless Measure (1967–2002)

== Bibliography ==
Selected articles:

- Beavers, Robert. Writings Millennium Film Journal no. 32/33 Fall 1988.
- Beavers, Robert. The Searching Measure. University of California, Berkeley Art Museum/Pacific Film Archive, 2004.
- Pipolo, Toni. "An Interview with Robert Beavers" Millennium Film Journal no. 32/33 Fall 1988.
- Iles, Chrissie. "Frames of Mind" Artforum September, 2005.
