= Gregory Markopoulos =

American filmmaker (1928–1992)

- Born: March 12, 1928; Toledo, Ohio, U.S.
- Died: November 12, 1992 (aged 64); Freiburg im Breisgau, Germany
- Education: USC School of Cinematic Arts (dropped out)
- Occupation: Filmmaker
- Notable work: Eniaios; The Illiac Passion; Twice a Man
- Partner: Robert Beavers (1966–1992)

Gregory J. Markopoulos (March 12, 1928 – November 12, 1992) was an American experimental filmmaker.

== Biography ==
Born in Toledo, Ohio in 1928 to Greek immigrant parents, Markopoulos began making 8 mm films at an early age. He attended USC Film School in the late 1940s, and went on to become a co-founder — with Jonas Mekas, Shirley Clarke, Stan Brakhage, and others — of the New American Cinema movement. He was also a contributor to Film Culture magazine, and an instructor at the Art Institute of Chicago.

In 1967, he and his partner Robert Beavers left the United States for permanent residence in Europe. Once ensconced in self-imposed exile, Markopoulos withdrew his films from circulation, refused any interviews, and insisted that a chapter about him be removed from the second edition of Visionary Film, P. Adams Sitney's seminal study of American avant-garde cinema. While he continued to make films, his work went largely unseen for almost 30 years.

Markopoulos dedicated his film (A)lter (A)ction to Rosa von Praunheim. Before von Praunheim became famous, he worked as an assistant-director for Markopoulos.

He died in 1992 in Freiburg im Breisgau, Germany.

== Selected filmography ==
- Du sang, de la volupté et de la mort (1947–48); 3 parts: Psyche, Lysis, Charmides
- The Dead Ones (1949, unfinished)
- Christmas, U.S.A. (1949); 13 min.
- Swain (1950)
- Flowers of Asphalt (1951)
- Serenity (1961)
- Twice a Man (1963)
- Galaxie (1966)
- Ming Green (1966)
- Bliss (1967)
- Eros, O Basileus (1967)
- Himself as Herself (1967)
- The Illiac Passion (1964–67)
- Through a Lens Brightly: Mark Turbyfill (1967)
- The Divine Damnation (1968)
- Gammelion (1968)
- The Mysteries (1968)
- Index - Hans Richter (1969)
- The Olympian (1969)
- Political Portraits (1969)
- Sorrows (1969)
- Alph (1970)
- Genius (1970)
- Hagiographia (1970, first version)
- Moment (1970)
- Cimabue! Cimabue! (1971)
- Doldertal 7 (1971)
- Saint Actaeon (1971)
- 35, Boulevard General Koenig (1971)
- Hagiographia (1973, second version)
- Heracles (1973)
- Meta (1973)
- Prosopographia (1976)
- Eniaios (1948-c.1990, 22 film cycles)

== Preservation ==
The Markopoulos film Galaxie (1966) was preserved by the Academy Film Archive in 2001.
