= Stan Brakhage filmography =

Over the course of more than five decades, the American experimental filmmaker Stan Brakhage produced a large body of work. All films in the filmography are assumed to be silent, in color, and are meant to be shown at 24 frames per second, unless otherwise noted. The Brakhage films, comprising his edited originals, intermediate elements, and other original material, are housed at the Academy of Motion Picture Arts and Sciences Film Archive, where a long-term project is underway to preserve and restore his entire film output.

Fifty-six of these films are available on DVD (as two separate volumes) and Blu-ray from the Criterion Collection.

Legend

Black-and-white
Black-and-white with sound
Color with sound

== 1950s ==
Notes

- During the late 1950s, Brakhage worked on several industrial films, many of them for the city of Pittsburgh.

Stan Brakhage 1950s' filmography
Year	Title	Format	Length	Notes
1952	Interim	16 mm	25 1/2 minutes	Black-and-white; features music by James Tenney
1953	The Boy and the Sea	16 mm	2 minutes	Black-and-white
1953	Unglassed Windows Cast a Terrible Reflection	16 mm	29 minutes	Black-and-white
1954	Desistfilm	16 mm	7 minutes	Black-and-white, sound
1954	The Extraordinary Child	16 mm	13 minutes	Black-and-white
1954	The Way to Shadow Garden	16 mm	11 1/2 minutes	Black-and-white, sound
1955	In Between	16 mm	10 1/2 minutes	First color film; features music by John Cage
1955	Reflections on Black	16 mm	12 minutes	Black-and-white, sound
1955	Untitled film of Geoffrey Holder’s Wedding	16 mm	Unknown	Co-directed with Larry Jordan
1955	The Wonder Ring	16 mm	6 minutes	
1955–1956	Gnir Rednow	16 mm	6 minutes	Co-directed with Joseph Cornell
1955–1956	Centuries of June	16 mm	6 minutes	Co-directed with Joseph Cornell; also known as Tower House, Bolts of Melody, Portrait of June, and June
1956	Flesh of Morning	16 mm	22 minutes	Black-and-white, sound; revised by Brakhage in 1986
1956	Nightcats	16 mm	8 minutes	
1956	Zone Moment	16 mm	3 minutes	
1957	Daybreak and White Eye	16 mm	8 minutes	Black-and-white, sound
1957	Loving	16 mm	5 minutes	
1958	Anticipation of the Night	16 mm	40 minutes	
1959	Cat's Cradle	16 mm	6 minutes	
1959	Sirius Remembered	16 mm	11 minutes	
1959	Wedlock House: An Intercourse	16 mm	11 minutes	Black-and-white
1959	Window Water Baby Moving	16 mm	12 minutes	

== 1960s ==
Stan Brakhage 1960s' filmography
Year	Title	Format	Length	Notes
1960	Mr. Tompkins Inside Himself	16 mm	42 minutes	Adaptation of Mr. Tompkins book by George Gamow
1960	The Dead	16 mm	11 minutes	
1961	Thigh Line Lyre Triangular	16 mm	6 minutes	
1961	Films by Stan Brakhage: An Avant-Garde Home Movie	16 mm	4 minutes	
1961	Dog Star Man: Prelude	16 mm	25 minutes	Part of Dog Star Man cycle
1962	Blue Moses	16 mm	10 minutes	Black-and-white, sound
1962	Silent Sound Sense Stars Subotnick and Sender	16 mm	2 minutes	Black-and-white, sound
1962–1963	Sartre's Nausea	16 mm	4 minutes	Black-and-white; title is a reference to Nausea by Jean-Paul Sartre
1962	Dog Star Man: Part 1	16 mm	31 minutes	Part of Dog Star Man cycle
1963	Mothlight	16 mm	3 minutes	
1963	Oh Life, A Woe Story, The A-Test News	16 mm	6 minutes	Black-and-white
1963	Dog Star Man: Part 2	16 mm	6 minutes	Part of Dog Star Man cycle
1964	Dog Star Man: Part 3	16 mm	8 minutes	Part of Dog Star Man cycle
1964	Dog Star Man: Part 4	16 mm	6 minutes	Part of Dog Star Man cycle
1964	Song 1	8 mm	3 minutes	Part of Songs cycle
1964	Song 2 & Song 3	8 mm	4 1/2 minutes	Part of Songs cycle
1964	Song 4	8 mm	3 minutes	Part of Songs cycle
1964	Song 5	8 mm	4 1/2 minutes	Part of Songs cycle
1964	Song 6 & Song 7	8 mm	4 1/2 minutes	Part of Songs cycle
1964	Song 8	8 mm	3 1/2 minutes	Part of Songs cycle
1965	The Art of Vision	16 mm	270 minutes	Expanded version of the Dog Star Man cycle, using the same footage
1965	Black Vision	16 mm	3 minutes	Black-and-white
1965	Fire of Waters	16 mm	7 minutes	Black-and-white, sound
1965	Pasht	16 mm	5 minutes	
1965	Three Films: Blue White, Blood’s Tone, Vein	16 mm	9 minutes	
1965	Two: Creeley/McClure	16 mm	3 minutes	
1965	The Female Mystique and Spare Leaves (For Gordon)	16 mm	5 minutes	
1965	Song 9 & Song 10	8 mm	7 minutes	Part of Songs cycle
1965	Song 11	8 mm	3 minutes	Part of Songs cycle
1965	Song 12	8 mm	3 minutes	Part of Songs cycle
1965	Song 13	8 mm	3 minutes	Part of Songs cycle
1965	Song 14	8 mm	3 minutes	Part of Songs cycle
1965	15 Song Traits	8 mm	38 1/2 minutes	Part of Songs cycle
1965	Song 16	8 mm	7 minutes	Part of Songs cycle
1965	Songs 17 & 18	8 mm	5 minutes	Part of Songs cycle
1965	Songs 19 & 20	8 mm	8 minutes	Part of Songs cycle
1965	Songs 21 & 22	8 mm	6 minutes	Part of Songs cycle
1966–1967	23rd Psalm Branch	8 mm	69 minutes	Part of Songs cycle; Brakhage later released the film as two halves under the names 23rd Psalm Branch: Part 1 (1979) and 23rd Psalm Branch: Part 2 (1980)
1967	Scenes from Under Childhood (Section One)	16 mm	24 1/2 minutes	Part of Scenes from Under Childhood cycle; available in versions with and without sound
1967	Eye Myth	35 mm	9 seconds	
1968	The Horseman, the Woman and the Moth	16 mm	19 minutes	
1968	Love Making	16 mm	36 minutes	
1968	Songs 24 & 25	8 mm	6 1/2 minutes	Part of Songs cycle; reissued in 16 mm in 1984
1968	Song 26	8 mm	8 minutes	Part of Songs cycle; reissued in 16 mm in 1984
1968	My Mtn. Song 27	8 mm	8 minutes	Part of Songs cycle; reissued in a 20 minute-version on 16 mm in 1987
1969	Song 27 (Part II) Rivers	8 mm	26 minutes	Part of Songs cycle; reissued on 16 mm in 1988
1969	Song 28	8 mm	3 minutes	Part of Songs cycle; reissued on 16 mm in 1985
1969	Song 29	8 mm	3 minutes	Part of Songs cycle; reissued on 16 mm in 1985
1969	American 30's Song	8 mm	35 minutes	Part of Songs cycle; running time given is for 18 frames per second
1969	Window Suite of Children’s Songs	8 mm	24 minutes	Part of Songs cycle.
1969	Scenes from Under Childhood (Section Two)	16 mm	40 minutes	Part of Scenes from Under Childhood cycle
1969	Scenes from Under Childhood (Section Three)	16 mm	25 minutes	Part of Scenes from Under Childhood cycle

=== Industrial films and other works ===
In the early 1960s, Brakhage directed several industrial and educational films, including two for the state of Colorado. He also directed commercials for Rural Electric of Dakota. In 1969, Brakhage served as cinematographer on the short film Nuptiae, directed by James Broughton.

== 1970s ==
Stan Brakhage 1970s' filmography
Year	Title	Format	Length	Notes
1970	Scenes from Under Childhood (Section Four)	16 mm	45 minutes	Part of Scenes from Under Childhood cycle
1970	The Weir-Falcon Saga	16 mm	29 minutes	
1970	The Machine of Eden	16 mm	11 1/2 minutes	
1970	Animals of Eden and After	16 mm	35 minutes	
1970	Sexual Meditation #1: Motel	Super 8	6 minutes	18 frames per second; part of Sexual Meditations cycle
1971	eyes	16 mm	35 minutes	Part of the "Pittsburgh Trilogy"
1971	Deus Ex	16 mm	33 minutes	Part of the "Pittsburgh Trilogy"
1971	The Act of Seeing with One's Own Eyes	16 mm	32 minutes	Part of the "Pittsburgh Trilogy"
1971	Wecht	16 mm	3 minutes	
1971	Angels	16 mm	2 minutes	
1971	Door	16 mm	3 1/2 minutes	
1971	Fox Fire Child Watch	16 mm	3 minutes	
1971	The Peaceable Kingdom	16 mm	8 minutes	
1971	Western History	16 mm	8 minutes	
1971	The Trip to Door	16 mm	12 1/2 minutes	
1971	Sexual Meditation: Room with View	16 mm	4 minutes	Part of Sexual Meditations cycle
1972	The Presence	16 mm	3 1/2 minutes	
1972	Eye Myth Educational	16 mm	2 minutes	Uses footage from Eye Myth
1972	Sexual Meditation: Faun's Room, Yale	16 mm	3 minutes	Part of Sexual Meditations cycle
1972	Sexual Meditation: Office Suite	16 mm	4 minutes	Part of Sexual Meditations cycle
1972	Sexual Meditation: Hotel	16 mm	6 1/2 minutes	Part of Sexual Meditations cycle
1972	Sexual Meditation: Open Field	16 mm	6 minutes	Part of Sexual Meditations cycle
1972	The Process	16 mm	9 minutes	
1972	The Riddle of Lumen	16 mm	13 minutes	
1972	The Shores of Phos: A Fable	16 mm	10 minutes	
1972	The Wold Shadow	16 mm	2 1/2 minutes	
1973	Gift	16 mm	3 minutes	
1973	The Women	16 mm	3 1/2 minutes	
1973	Sincerity I	16 mm	27 minutes	Part of Sincerity cycle
1974	Aquarien	16 mm	3 minutes	
1974	Clancy	16 mm	4 1/2 minutes	
1974	Dominion	16 mm	4 minutes	
1974	Flight	16 mm	5 1/2 minutes	
1974	"He was born, he suffered, he died."	16 mm	7 1/2 minutes	
1974	Hymn to Her	16 mm	2 1/2 minutes	
1974	Skein	16 mm	5 minutes	
1974	Sol	16 mm	4 minutes	
1974	Star Garden	16 mm	22 minutes	
1974	The Text of Light	16 mm	71 minutes	
1974	The Stars are Beautiful	16 mm	19 minutes	Sound
1975	Short Films: 1975	16 mm	38 minutes	A collection of ten works ranging from 2 1/2 to 6 minutes in length that Brakhage distributed as a single piece.: 1. "Jane's Memory"; 2. "Dante's Styx"; 3. "Hollis Frampton"; 4. "Jane's Memory"; 5. "Niagara Falls"; 6. "Stars, Chickens, Eyes, Candles"; 7. "Turning the Raccoon Loose"; 8. "Small Town Streets"; 9. "Forest Love Scene"; 10. "Painted Lightning"
1975	Sincerity II	16 mm	38 minutes	Part of Sincerity cycle
1976	Gadflies	Super 8	12 1/2 minutes	18 frames per second
1976	Sketches	Super 8	9 minutes	18 frames per second
1976	Window	Super 8/16 mm	10 1/2 minutes	18 frames per second
1976	Trio	Super 8/16 mm	6 1/2 minutes	18 frames per second
1976	Rembrandt, Etc., and Jane	Super 8/16 mm	17 1/2 minutes	18 frames per second
1976	Desert	Super 8/16 mm	11 minutes	18 frames per second
1976	Highs	Super 8/16 mm	7 minutes	18 frames per second
1976	Airs	Super 8/16 mm	24 minutes	18 frames per second
1976	Absence	Super 8/16 mm	8 minutes	18 frames per second
1976	Short Films: 1976	16 mm	25 minutes	
1976	The Dream, NYC, The Return, The Flower	Super 8/16 mm	24 1/2 minutes	18 frames per second
1976	Tragoedia	16 mm	35 minutes	
1977	The Domain of the Moment	16 mm	15 1/2 minutes	
1977	The Governor	16 mm	57 1/2 minutes	
1977	Soldiers and Other Cosmic Objects	16 mm	22 minutes	
1978	Bird	16 mm	4 minutes	
1978	Burial Path	16 mm	15 minutes	18 frames per second
1978	Centre	16 mm	13 minutes	18 frames per second
1978	Nightmare Series	16 mm	20 minutes	
1978	Purity and After	16 mm	5 minutes	18 frames per second
1978	Sluice	16 mm	6 minutes	18 frames per second
1978	Duplicity I	16 mm	23 minutes	Part of Duplicity cycle
1978	Duplicity II	16 mm	20 minutes	Part of Duplicity cycle
1978	Thot-Fal’N	16 mm	9 minutes	18 frames per second
1978	Sincerity III	16 mm	35 minutes	Part of Sincerity cycle
1979	@	16 mm	6 minutes	18 frames per second
1979	Creation	16 mm	17 minutes	18 frames per second
1979	I	16 mm	6 minutes	18 frames per second; part of the "Roman Numeral Series" (also called the "Romans")
1979	II	16 mm	9 minutes	18 frames per second; part of the "Roman Numeral Series" (also called the "Romans")
1979	III	16 mm	2 minutes	18 frames per second; part of the "Roman Numeral Series" (also called the "Romans")
1979	IV	16 mm	2 minutes	18 frames per second; part of the "Roman Numeral Series" (also called the "Romans")
1979	V	16 mm	3 minutes	18 frames per second; part of the "Roman Numeral Series" (also called the "Romans")

=== Other missing works ===
Around 1979, Brakhage produced as many as five films using the Polavision developed by Polaroid. These films are estimated to have been about 2 1/2 minutes each in length. Their present whereabouts are unknown.

== 1980s ==
Stan Brakhage 1980s' filmography
Year	Title	Format	Length	Notes
1980	VI	16 mm	10 minutes	18 frames per second; part of the "Roman Numeral Series" (also called the "Romans")
1980	VII	16 mm	5 minutes	18 frames per second; part of the "Roman Numeral Series" (also called the "Romans")
1980	Made Manifest	16 mm	12 minutes	
1980	Other	16 mm	3 minutes	18 frames per second.
1980	Salome	16 mm	3 minutes	18 frames per second.
1980	Sincerity IV	16 mm	37 minutes	Part of Sincerity cycle
1980	Sincerity V	16 mm	35 minutes	Part of Sincerity cycle
1980	Duplicity III	16 mm	23 1/2 minutes	Part of Duplicity cycle
1980	Murder Psalm	16 mm	18 minutes	
1981	1	16 mm	5 1/2 minutes	18 frames per second; part of the "Arabic Numeral Series" (also called the "Arabics")
1981	2	16 mm	7 minutes	18 frames per second; part of the "Arabic Numeral Series" (also called the "Arabics")
1981	3	16 mm	10 1/2 minutes	18 frames per second; part of the "Arabic Numeral Series" (also called the "Arabics")
1981	VIII	16 mm	4 minutes	18 frames per second; part of the "Roman Numeral Series" (also called the "Romans")
1981	IX	16 mm	2 minutes	18 frames per second; part of the "Roman Numeral Series" (also called the "Romans")
1981	Aftermath	16 mm	8 minutes	
1981	The Garden of Earthly Delights	35 mm	1 1/2 minutes	
1981	Nodes	16 mm	3 minutes	
1981	RR	16 mm	8 minutes	
1981	Unconscious London Strata	16 mm	22 minutes	
1981	4	16 mm	10 minutes	18 frames per second; part of the "Arabic Numeral Series" (also called the "Arabics")
1981	5	16 mm	5 minutes	18 frames per second; part of the "Arabic Numeral Series" (also called the "Arabics")
1981	6	16 mm	11 minutes	18 frames per second; part of the "Arabic Numeral Series" (also called the "Arabics")
1981	7	16 mm	11 minutes	18 frames per second; part of the "Arabic Numeral Series" (also called the "Arabics")
1981	8	16 mm	7 minutes	18 frames per second; part of the "Arabic Numeral Series" (also called the "Arabics")
1981	9	16 mm	12 minutes	18 frames per second; part of the "Arabic Numeral Series" (also called the "Arabics")
1981	0 + 10	16 mm	27 1/2 minutes	18 frames per second; part of the "Arabic Numeral Series" (also called the "Arabics")
1981	11	16 mm	10 1/2 minutes	18 frames per second; part of the "Arabic Numeral Series" (also called the "Arabics")
1981	12	16 mm	27 minutes	18 frames per second; part of the "Arabic Numeral Series" (also called the "Arabics")
1981	13	16 mm	5 minutes	18 frames per second; part of the "Arabic Numeral Series" (also called the "Arabics")
1982	14	16 mm	5 1/2 minutes	18 frames per second; part of the "Arabic Numeral Series" (also called the "Arabics")
1982	15	16 mm	7 1/2 minutes	18 frames per second; part of the "Arabic Numeral Series" (also called the "Arabics")
1982	16	16 mm	8 1/2 minutes	18 frames per second; part of the "Arabic Numeral Series" (also called the "Arabics")
1982	17	16 mm	8 minutes	18 frames per second; part of the "Arabic Numeral Series" (also called the "Arabics")
1982	18	16 mm	8 1/2 minutes	18 frames per second; part of the "Arabic Numeral Series" (also called the "Arabics")
1982	19	16 mm	9 minutes	18 frames per second; part of the "Arabic Numeral Series" (also called the "Arabics")
1983	Hell Spit Flexion	16 mm/35 mm	1 minute	Part of "The Dante Quartet"
1984	Egyptian Series	16 mm	17 minutes	
1984	Tortured Dust, part 1	16 mm	23 minutes	
1984	Tortured Dust, part 2	16 mm	21 1/2 minutes	
1984	Tortured Dust, part 3	16 mm	24 1/2 minutes	
1984	Tortured Dust, part 4	16 mm	24 1/2 minutes	
1985	Jane	16 mm	13 minutes	
1986	The Aerodyne	16 mm	3 minutes	Later included as part of Caswallon Trilogy
1986	Fireloop	16 mm	3 minutes	Sound by Joel Haertling; later included as part of Caswallon Trilogy
1986	Dance Shadows by Danelle Helander	16 mm	2 1/2 minutes	Later included as part of Caswallon Trilogy
1986	Confession	16 mm	27 minutes	Also known as Love Sacrifice
1986	The Loom	16 mm	43 1/2 minutes	Also known as Love Sacrifice
1986	Night Music	16 mm/35 mm	30 seconds	Part of Three Hand-Painted Films
1987	Loud Visual Noises	16 mm	3 1/2 minutes	Available in a silent version and a sound version with music by Die Tödliche Doris, Zoviet France, The Hafler Trio, Nurse with Wound, Joel Haertling, and I.H.T.S.O.
1987	The Dante Quartet	16 mm/35 mm	6 minutes	
1987	Kindering	16 mm	3 minutes	Sound by Architects Office
1988	Faustfilm: An Opera, Part 1	16 mm	43 1/2 minutes	Sound; part of the Faustfilm project
1988	I... Dreaming	16 mm	7 minutes	Sound by Joel Haertling
1988	Marilyn's Window	16 mm	9 minutes	Title refers to Brakhage's wife, Marilyn Brakhage
1988	Matins	16 mm	2 1/2 minutes	
1988	Rage Net	16 mm/35 mm	1 minute	Part of Three Hand-Painted Films
1988	Faust's Other: An Idyll	16 mm	44 1/2 minutes	Sound; part of the Faustfilm project
1988	Faust 3: Candida Arbacore	16 mm	27 minutes	Sound by Joel Haertling; part of the Faustfilm project
1988	Faust IV	16 mm	38 1/2 minutes	Sound; part of the Faustfilm project
1989	Visions in Meditation	16 mm	17 1/2 minutes	Part of the Visions in Meditation cycle
1989	Visions in Meditation #2	16 mm	17 minutes	Part of the Visions in Meditation cycle
1989	Babylon Series #1	16 mm	6 minutes	

== 1990s ==
Stan Brakhage 1990s' filmography
Year	Title	Format	Length	Notes
1990	Visions in Meditation #3	16 mm	18 minutes	Part of the Visions in Meditation cycle; subtitled "Plato's Cave"
1990	Visions in Meditation #4	16 mm	19 minutes	Part of the Visions in Meditation cycle; subtitled "D.H. Lawrence"
1990	Babylon Series #2	16 mm	2 minutes	
1990	Babylon Series #3	16 mm	6 minutes	
1990	City Streaming	16 mm	19 1/2 minutes	
1990	The Thatch of Night	16 mm	5 minutes	
1990	Vision of the Fire Tree	16 mm	5 minutes	
1990	Passage Through: A Ritual	16 mm	49 minutes	Music by Philip Corner
1990	Glaze of Cathexis	16 mm	3 minutes	Part of Three Hand-painted Films
1991	Agnus Dei Kinder Synapse	16 mm	4 minutes	
1991	A Child’s Garden and the Serious Sea	16 mm	74 minutes	One of the Vancouver Island films
1991	Christ Mass Sex Dance	16 mm	4 minutes	Sound
1991	Delicacies of Molten Horror Synapse	16 mm	8 minutes	
1992	Crack Glass Eulogy	16 mm	6 minutes	Sound
1992	Interpolations 1–5	35 mm	12 minutes	
1992	Untitled (For Marilyn)	16 mm	11 minutes	The film is officially untitled, but is referred to by the dedication that appears in place of a title card. It is dedicated to his wife Marilyn Brakhage.
1993	Boulder Blues and Pearls and...	16 mm	23 1/2 minutes	Sound
1993	Blossom Gift Favor	16 mm	2 minutes	
1993	Autumnal	16 mm	5 minutes	
1993	Ephemeral Solidity	16 mm	4 1/2 minutes	
1993	The Harrowing	16 mm	2 minutes	
1993	Tryst Haunt	16 mm	3 minutes	
1993	Stellar	16 mm	2 1/2 minutes	
1993	Study in Color and Black-and-white	16 mm	2 minutes	
1993	Three Homerics: Diana Holding Back the Night, The Rolling Sea, and Love Again	16 mm	6 minutes	
1994	Black Ice	16 mm	6 minutes	
1994	Cannot Exist	16 mm	1 minute	
1994	Cannot Not Exist	16 mm	8 minutes	
1994	Chartres Series	16 mm	8 1/2 minutes	
1994	Elementary Phrases	16 mm	34 1/2 minutes	Made in collaboration with Phil Solomon
1994	From: First Hymn to the Night – Novalis	16 mm	2 1/2 minutes	
1994	The Mammals of Victoria	16 mm	34 1/2 minutes	One of the Vancouver Island films
1994	Naughts	16 mm	6 minutes	
1995	I Take These Truths	16 mm	18 minutes	
1995	We Hold These	16 mm	12 minutes	
1995	I...	16 mm	27 minutes	
1995	In Consideration of Pompeii	16 mm	4 1/2 minutes	18 frames per second
1995	Paranoia Corridor	16 mm	3 1/2 minutes	
1995	The "b" Series	16 mm	12 1/2 minutes	
1995	Earthen Aerie	16 mm	3 minutes	
1995	The Lost Films	16 mm	45 minutes	Made of nine untitled films completed in 1991 and 1992
1995	Spring Cycle	16 mm	11 minutes	
1995	...Preludes 1–6	16 mm	11 1/2 minutes	
1995	...Preludes 7–12	16 mm	16 1/2 minutes	
1996	...Preludes 13–18	16 mm	10 minutes	
1996	...Preludes 19–24	16 mm	10 minutes	
1996	Beautiful Funerals	16 mm	2 minutes	
1996	Blue Value	16 mm	3 minutes	
1996	Concrescence	16 mm	4 minutes	Made in collaboration with Phil Solomon
1996	The Fur of Home	16 mm	3 minutes	
1996	Polite Madness	16 mm	3 minutes	
1996	Sexual Saga	16 mm	3 minutes	
1996	Through Wounded Eyes	16 mm	7 minutes	Made in collaboration with Joel Haertling
1996	Two Found Objects of Charles Boultenhouse	16 mm	7 minutes	
1996	Commingled Containers	16 mm	7 minutes	
1997	Shockingly Hot	16 mm	4 minutes	
1997	The Cat of the Worm’s Green Realm	16 mm	15 1/2 minutes	
1997	Last Hymn to the Night – Novalis	16 mm	19 minutes	
1997	Divertimento	16 mm	2 1/2 minutes	
1997	Self Song & Death Song	16 mm	4 1/2 minutes	
1997	Yggdrasill: Whose Roots Are Stars in the Human Mind	16 mm	17 minutes	
1998	...	16 mm	95 minutes	Also known as Ellipses; consists of five separate reels, the last of which has sound. According to film critic and Brakhage scholar Fred Camper, the filmmaker "[had] said that it's acceptable to show any number of these in any order."
1999	The Birds of Paradise	16 mm	3 minutes	
1999	Coupling	16 mm	5 minutes	
1999	Cloud Chamber	16 mm	4 minutes	
1999	Cricket Requiem	16 mm	3 minutes	
1999	The Dark Tower	16 mm	3 minutes	
1999	The Earthsong of the Cricket	16 mm	3 minutes	
1999	The Lion and the Zebra Make God’s Raw Jewels	16 mm	8 1/2 minutes	
1999	Moilsome Toilsome	16 mm	6 minutes	
1999	Stately Mansions Did Decree	16 mm	5 1/2 minutes	
1999	Worm and Web Love	16 mm	4 1/2 minutes	
1999	The Persian Series 1–5	16 mm	20 minutes	

== 2000s ==
Stan Brakhage 2000s' filmography
Year	Title	Format	Length	Notes
2000	The Persian Series 6–12	16 mm	23 minutes	
2000	The Persian Series 13–18	16 mm	9 minutes	
2000	Dance	16 mm	6 1/2 minutes	Starring Vivienne Palmer
2000	The God of Day Had Gone Down Upon Him	16 mm	49 minutes	One of the "Vancouver Island" films
2000	Water for Maya	16 mm	3 1/2 minutes	
2000	Jesus Trilogy and Coda	16 mm	17 minutes	
2001	Rounds	16 mm	14 minutes	
2001	Garden Path	16 mm	7 minutes	Made in collaboration with Mary Beth Reed
2001	Micro Garden	16 mm	4 minutes	
2001	Night Mulch	35 mm	2 minutes	
2001	Very	35 mm	4 minutes	
2001	Micro Garden	16 mm	4 minutes	
2001	Occam's Thread	16 mm	6 minutes	
2001	Dark Night of the Soul	16 mm	3 minutes	
2001	Lovesong	16 mm	11 minutes	Part of the Lovesongs cycle
2001	Lovesong 2	16 mm	3 minutes	Part of the Lovesongs cycle
2001	Lovesong 3	16 mm	9 minutes	Part of the Lovesongs cycle
2001	Lovesong 4	16 mm	3 minutes	Part of the Lovesongs cycle
2002	Lovesong	16 mm	1 minutes	Part of the Lovesongs cycle
2002	Song of the Mushroom	16 mm	2 minutes	Made in collaboration with Joel Haertling
2002	Ascension	16 mm	2 1/2 minutes	
2002	Resurrectus Est	16 mm	8 minutes	
2002	Max	16 mm	3 minutes	
2002	SB (One Minute for Vienna)	16 mm	30 seconds	
2002	Seasons...	16 mm	15 minutes	Made in collaboration with Phil Solomon
2002	Panels for the Walls of Heaven	16 mm	31 minutes	One of the "Vancouver Island" films; the last of Brakhage's longer works
2003	Stan's Window and Work in Progress	16 mm	13 minutes	Stan's Window and Work in Progress were usually shown together; Stan's Window was the last film Brakhage completed before his death, and Work in Progress consists of the last footage he shot.
2003	Chinese Series	35 mm	2 1/2 minutes	A project Brakhage was working on at the time of his death; only printed posthumously
