= List of avant-garde films of the 1960s =

This is a list of avant-garde and experimental films released between 1960 and 1969. Unless where noted, all films had sound and were in black and white.

== 1960–1964 ==
Title	Director	Cast	Nation	Notes	Ref(s)
1960
Actua-Tilt	Jean Herman	Monique Le Porrier, Claude-Jean Phillipe	France		
Arnulf Rainer	Peter Kubelka		Austria		
Bäume in Herbst (Trees in Autumn)	Kurt Kren		Austria		
The Dead	Stan Brakhage	Kenneth Anger	United States		
The Flower Thief	Ron Rice	Taylor Mead	United States		
Savage Eye	Ben Maddow, Sidney Meyers, Joseph Strick		United States		
Vasarely'	Peter Kassovitz		France	Music: "NEG-ALE," by Iannis Xenakis.	
1961
Allures	Jordan Belson		United States	Abstract animation, color.	
The Autumn Feast	Piero Heliczer, Jeff Keen	Piero Heliczer, Kate Heliczer	United Kingdom	Black and white/color, sound on tape.	
Critique de la séparation	Guy Debord		France		
Dadascope	Hans Richter		United States		
A Fire	Ebrahim Golestan		Iran		
Forgotten Faces	Peter Watkins		United Kingdom		
Guns of the Trees	Jonas Mekas		United States		
Mr Hayashi	Bruce Baillie		United States		
Night Tide	Curtis Harrington	Dennis Hopper, Margaret Cameron	United States		
On Sundays	Bruce Baillie	Jean Wong, Roy Ferguson	United States	Begun in 1960. Baillie's first film, a hybrid of documentary and experimental narrative.	
The Sin of Jesus	Robert Frank	Roberts Blossom, Julie Bovasso	United States	Based on story by Isaac Babel, music by Morton Feldman.	
Thigh Line Lyre Triangular	Stan Brakhage	Jane Brakhage	United States		
1962
Baud'larian Capers	Ken Jacobs		United States		
Blue Moses	Stan Brakhage	Robert Benson	United States		
Dog Star Man: Prelude	Stan Brakhage	Stan Brakhage, Jane Brakhage	United States		
Heaven and Earth Magic	Harry Smith		United States		
The House is Black	Forugh Farrokhzad		Iran		
La Jetée	Chris Marker	Hélène Chatelain, Davos Hanich	France		
Regardez-moi, cela suffit	Ben Vautier		France		
Sonne halt!	Ferry Radax	Konrad Bayer	Austria		
Speak	John Latham		United Kingdom		
Thanatopsis	Ed Emshwiller		United States		
1963
Blonde Cobra	Ken Jacobs, Bob Fleischner	Jack Smith, Jerry Sims	United States	Filmed in 1959-60; completed by Jacobs in 1963.	
By the Sea	Pat O'Neill		United States		
Christmas on Earth	Barbara Rubin	Gerard Malanga	United States	Black and white.	
Chumlum	Ron Rice		United States		
The Death of P'town	Ken Jacobs		United States		
Dog Star Man: Part I	Stan Brakhage	Stan Brakhage, Jane Brakhage	United States		
The Existentialist	Leon Prochnik	Ruth Abramson, Gilbert Archer, Edward Blair	United States		
Flaming Creatures	Jack Smith	Jack Smith, Mario Montez, Judith Malina	United States	Color.	
Little Stabs at Happiness	Ken Jacobs	Jack Smith, Jerry Sims	United States	Color; partly filmed in 1959-60 and often dated to 1960, but film states 1963.	
Mothlight	Stan Brakhage		United States		
Normal Love	Jack Smith	Diana Baccus, Beverly Grant, Mario Montez	United States	Color.	
O necem jinem (Something Different)	Vera Chytilová	Vladimir Bosak, Eva Bosáková, Dagmar Cejnkova	Czechoslovakia		
The Queen of Sheba Meets the Atom Man	Ron Rice	Winifred Bryan, Taylor Mead	United States		
Scorpio Rising	Kenneth Anger	Bruce Byron	United States	Color.	
Sun in Your Head	Wolf Vostell		West Germany	Early video art, captured on film; converted back to video in 1967.	
Towers Open Fire	Antony Balch	William S. Burroughs, Brion Gysin	United Kingdom	Black and white/color, first shown in 1966; written by Burroughs.	
TV Plug	Ken Jacobs		United States		
Twice a Man	Gregory Markopoulos		United States		
William Buys a Parrot	Antony Balch	William S. Burroughs	United Kingdom	Color.	
1964
Blue Rider (Godard-art)	Tomislav Gotovac		Yugoslavia		
The Brig	Jonas Mekas	The Living Theatre, Warren Finnerty, Henry Howard, Tom Lilard, Steven Ben Israel, Rufus Collins, Michael Elias, George Bartenieff, Henry Proach, James Anderson	United States		
The Cool World	Shirley Clarke	Hampton Clanton	United States	Black and white, music by Dizzy Gillespie.	
Dog Star Man	Stan Brakhage		United States	Begun in 1961, color, silent.	
Help! My Snowman's Burning Down	Carson Davidson	Bob Larkin	United States	Independently produced surrealist comedy short, nominated for best short subject, Academy Awards 1965. Music by Gerry Mulligan.	
Hugh MacDiarmid: A Portrait	Margaret Tait	Hugh MacDiarmid	United Kingdom		
I Am Cuba	Mikhail Kalotozov	Sergio Corrieri, Salvador Wood	Cuba; Soviet Union		
It Happened Here	Kevin Brownlow, Andrew Mollo	Pauline Murray, Sebastian Shaw	United Kingdom		
The Last Clean Shirt	Alfred Leslie		United States	Dialogue by Frank O'Hara.	
Sleep	Andy Warhol	John Giorno	United States	Filmed in July 1963; first shown in January 1964.	
Song 1	Stan Brakhage	Stan Brakhage, Jane Brakhage	United States	Part of Songs cycle.	
Song 2	Stan Brakhage		United States	Part of Songs cycle.	
Song 3	Stan Brakhage		United States	Part of Songs cycle.	
Song 4	Stan Brakhage		United States	Part of Songs cycle.	
Song 5	Stan Brakhage	Jane Brakhage	United States	Part of Songs cycle.	
Song 6	Stan Brakhage		United States	Part of Songs cycle.	
Song 7	Stan Brakhage		United States	Part of Songs cycle.	
Song 8	Stan Brakhage		United States	Part of Songs cycle.	

== 1965–1969 ==
Title	Director(s)	Cast	Nation	Notes
1965
15 Song Traits	Stan Brakhage	Stan Brakhage, Jane Brakhage	United States	
The Art of Vision	Stan Brakhage	Stan Brakhage, Jane Brakhage	United States	
Award Presentation to Andy Warhol	Jonas Mekas	Andy Warhol, Jane Holzer, Gerard Malanga, Jonas Mekas, Ivy Nicholson, Gregory J. Markopoulos	United States	
Black Vision	Stan Brakhage		United States	
Brus.Wuenscht. Euch.Seine. Weinachten.	Kurt Kren	Günter Brus	Austria	Documentation of a Vienna Actionist piece
Derby	Jože Pogačnik		Yugoslavia	Short documentary of a football match between Olimpija Ljubljana and NK Maribor
Dirty	Stephen Dwoskin		United Kingdom	
Les Escargots	René Laloux, Roland Topor		France	Surreal animation
Film in Which There Appear Edge Lettering, Sprocket Holes, Dirt Particles, Etc.	Owen Land		United States	
Film Magazine of the Arts	Jonas Mekas		United States	
Fire of Waters	Stan Brakhage		United States	
Fuses	Carolee Schneemann		United States	
Kustom Kar Kommandos	Kenneth Anger		United States	
Now!	Santiago Álvarez		Cuba	
Pasht	Stan Brakhage		United States	
Peyote Queen	Storm de Hirsch		United States	Color.
Ruka (The Hand)	Jiří Trnka		Czechoslovakia	Satirical animation
The Saragossa Manuscript	Wojciech Has	Iga Cembrzyńska, Zbigniew Cybulski Joanna Jędryka	Poland	
Schmeerguntz	Gunvor Nelson, Dorothy Wiley		United States	
Silber - Aktion Brus	Kurt Kren	Günter Brus	Austria	Documentation of a Vienna Actionist piece
Song 9	Stan Brakhage		United States	Part of Songs cycle
Song 10	Stan Brakhage		United States	Part of Songs cycle
Song 11	Stan Brakhage		United States	Part of Songs cycle
Song 12	Stan Brakhage		United States	Part of Songs cycle
Song 13	Stan Brakhage		United States	Part of Songs cycle
Song 14	Stan Brakhage		United States	Part of Songs cycle
Song 16	Stan Brakhage		United States	Part of Songs cycle
Song 17	Stan Brakhage		United States	Part of Songs cycle
Song 18	Stan Brakhage		United States	Part of Songs cycle
Song 19	Stan Brakhage		United States	Part of Songs cycle
Song 20	Stan Brakhage		United States	Part of Songs cycle
Song 21	Stan Brakhage		United States	Part of Songs cycle
Song 22	Stan Brakhage		United States	Part of Songs cycle
Two: Creeley/McClure	Stan Brakhage	Robert Creeley, Michael McClure	United States	
Vinyl	Andy Warhol	Gerard Malanga, Edie Sedgwick	United States	Black and white; written by Ronald Tavel, based on Anthony Burgess' novel A Clockwork Orange
The War Game	Peter Watkins	Michael Aspel, Peter Graham	United Kingdom	Made for BBC TV, but not broadcast until 1985
Water Sark	Joyce Wieland	Joyce Wieland		
Wholly Communion	Peter Whitehead	Allen Ginsberg, Michael Horovitz, Ernst Jandl, Adrian Mitchell	United Kingdom	Documents a poetry event held on 11 June 1965 called the International Poetry Incarnation
1966
All My Life	Bruce Baillie		United States	
Andy Warhol's Silver Flotations	Willard Maas		United Kingdom	Shot at the Leo Castelli Gallery in New York City
Cassis	Jonas Mekas		United States	
Castle 1	Malcolm Le Grice		United Kingdom	
Castro Street	Bruce Baillie		United States	
Cerro Pelado	Santiago Álvarez		Cuba	Documentary about the Cuban Olympic team trying to enter Puerto Rico
The Cut-Ups	Antony Balch	William S. Burroughs, Brion Gysin	United Kingdom	Black and white, written by Burroughs
Daisies	Vera Chytilová	Jitka Cerhová, Ivana Karbanová	Czechoslovakia	
Do Not Ask Where We Are Going	Tomislav Gotovac		Yugoslavia	
Faire un effort	Ben (Ben Vautier)		France	
The Flicker	Tony Conrad		United States	Black and white
Hold Me While I'm Naked	George Kuchar	George Kuchar, Donna Kerness	United States	
Outer and Inner Space	Andy Warhol	Edie Sedgwick	United States	
Persona	Ingmar Bergman	Bibi Andersson, Liv Ullmann, Margaretha Krook	Sweden	Black and white
Relativity	Ed Emshwiller			
Report from Millbrook	Jonas Mekas		United States	
Sound?	John Cage, Roland Kirk		United States	
Turn, Turn, Turn	Jud Yalkut		United States	Color. Award of Merit, Ann Arbor Film Festival, 1966
Unsere Afrikareise (Our Trip to Africa)	Peter Kubelka		Austria	Documentary about a hunting trip in Africa
Wintercourse	Paul Sharits		United States	
Word Movie	Paul Sharits		United States	
Yesterday Girl	Alexander Kluge	Alexandra Kluge	West Germany	Black and white
1967
23rd Psalm Branch	Stan Brakhage		United States	Part of Songs cycle
7362	Pat O'Neill		United States	
Beginning	Artavazd Peleshian		Soviet Union	
David Holzman's Diary	Jim McBride	L.M. Kit Carson, Eileen Dietz, Louise Levine, Lorenzo Mans	United States	
Eclipse of the Sun Virgin	George Kuchar	Frances Leibowitz, Debby Roman, Joe Zinzi	United States	
La Femme 100 têtes	Éric Duvivier		France	Surrealist short film
The Great Blondino	Robert Nelson and William T. Wiley	Chuck Wiley	United States	
Hare Krishna	Jonas Mekas	Srila Prabhupada, Barbara Rubin, Philip Corner, Allen Ginsberg	United States	
Hasta la victoria siempre	Santiago Álvarez		Cuba	Government-commissioned documentary about Che Guevara, made within 48 hours of his death
I Am Curious (Yellow)	Vilgot Sjöman	Vilgot Sjöman, Lena Nyman, Börje Ahlstedt	Sweden	Black and white
The Illiac Passion	Gregory Markopoulos	Richard Beauvais, David Beauvais	United States	
The Image	Michael Armstrong (cinematographer)	Michael Byrne (actor), David Bowie	United Kingdom	Black and white, completed in 1967 but not released until 1969, David Bowie's first screen appearance
The Italian Notebook	Jonas Mekas		United States	
Jeanetta Cochrane	Peter Whitehead		United Kingdom	
Kusama's Self-Obliteration	Yayoi Kusama, Jud Yalkut	Yayoi Kusama	United States	
Little Dog for Roger	Malcolm Le Grice		United Kingdom	
Love Affair, or: The Case of the Missing Switchboard Operator	Dušan Makavejev	Slobodan Aligrudić, Eva Ras	Yugoslavia	
Marvo Movie	Jeff Keen		United Kingdom	
Notes on the Circus	Jonas Mekas		United States	
Samadhi	Jordan Belson		United States	Abstract, color
Song 24	Stan Brakhage		United States	Part of Songs cycle
Song 25	Stan Brakhage		United States	Part of Songs cycle
The Song of Assisi	Jonas Mekas	Pier Paolo Pasolini	United States	Travel Songs series
The Song of Avila	Jonas Mekas	Jonas Mekas	United States	Travel Songs series
The Song of Italy	Jonas Mekas		United States	Travel Songs series
Spiracle	Robert Beavers		United States	
Ulysses	Joseph Strick	Barbara Jefford, T. P. McKenna, Milo O'Shea, Maurice Roëves	United Kingdom; United States	Adaptation of the James Joyce novel
Viet Flakes	Carolee Schneemann		United States	
Wavelength	Michael Snow	Hollis Frampton, Roswell Rudd, Amy Taubin, Joyce Wieland	Canada	Structural film
Weekend	Jean-Luc Godard	Mireille Darc, Jean-Pierre Léaud, Jean Yanne	France	
Winged Dialogue	Robert Beavers		United States	
You're Human Like the Rest of Them	B. S. Johnson	William Hoyland	United Kingdom	
1968
2001: A Space Odyssey	Stanley Kubrick	Keir Dullea, Gary Lockwood	United Kingdom; United States	
Alaska	Dore O.		United States	
Around Perception (Autour de la perception)	Pierre Hébert		Canada	Computer animation with hand-drawn soundtrack.
The Bed	James Broughton		United Kingdom	
Cinétracts	Jean-Luc Godard, Chris Marker, Alain Resnais		France	Unsigned mini-films, made in the wake of the May 1968 uprisings, usually shot on 8mm
Contras'city	Djibril Diop Mambéty		Senegal	City film, made in Dakar
Diaries, Notes and Sketches (also known as Walden)	Jonas Mekas	Timothy Leary, Ed Emshwiller, Jack Smith, Mario Montez, Nico, Edie Sedgwick, Andy Warhol, Judith Malina, Storm De Hirsch, Norman Mailer, John Lennon, Yoko Ono	United States	Involves a wide swath of the 1960s NYC avant-garde scene.
Faces	John Cassavetes	Lynn Carlin, Seymour Cassell, Fred Draper, John Marley, Gena Rowlands	United States	
Fando y Lis	Alejandro Jodorowsky	Sergio Kleiner, Diana Mariscal	Mexico	Written by Fernando Arrabal
Flesh	Paul Morrissey	Jackie Curtis, Joe Dallesandro, Candy Darling, Geraldine Smith	United States	Produced by Andy Warhol
Hall	Peter Gidal		United Kingdom	
Hanoi, martes 13	Santiago Álvarez		Cuba	Anti-Vietnam War documentary
La hora de los hornos (Hour of the Furnaces)	Octavio Getino, Fernando Solanas		Argentina	Agitprop documentary, made of segments that could be stopped for audiences to discuss them
The Horseman, the Woman, and the Moth	Stan Brakhage		United States	
I Am Curious (Blue)	Vilgot Sjöman	Vilgot Sjöman, Peter Lindgren, Lena Nyman	Sweden	Black and white
Innocence Unprotected	Dušan Makavejev	Dragoljub Aleksić	Yugoslavia	Reworking of an unreleased film made in 1941
LBJ	Santiago Álvarez		Cuba	Anti-Vietnam War documentary
Lovemaking	Stan Brakhage		United States	
Memorias del Subdesarrollo (Memories of Underdevelopment)	Tomás Gutiérrez Alea	Sergio Corrieri, Daisy Granados	Cuba	
Metamorfosis	António Palolo		Portugal	
The Movie Orgy	Joe Dante, Jon Davison		United States	Massive collage film, running 7.5 hours, cut in 2010 to 4.5 hours
My Mountain Song 27	Stan Brakhage		United States	Part of Songs cycle
N:O:T:H:I:N:G	Paul Sharits		United States	Silent
Pas de deux (Duo)	Norman McLaren	Margaret Mercier, Vincent Warren	Canada	Dance film, uses optical printing. Black and white.
Plan of Brussels	Robert Beavers		United States	18 mins
Rat Life and Diet in North America	Joyce Wieland		Canada	
The Sixth Side of the Pentagon	Chris Marker		France	
Song 26	Stan Brakhage		United States	Part of Songs cycle
Sorbet III	Frans Zwartjes		Netherlands	
Teorema	Pier Paolo Pasolini	Laura Betti, Massimo Girotti, Silvana Mangano, Terence Stamp	Italy	
1969
American 30's Song	Stan Brakhage		United States	Part of Songs cycle
Cain's Film	Jamie Wadhawan	Alexander Trocchi	United Kingdom	
The Color of Pomegranates	Sergei Parajanov	Sofiko Chiaureli, Melkon Aleksanyan, Vilen Galstyan	Soviet Union	Color
The Count of Days	Robert Beavers		United States	21 mins
Easy Rider	Dennis Hopper	Peter Fonda, Dennis Hopper, Jack Nicholson	United States	Hollywood "road movie;" partly experimental
Erwin, Toni, Ilse	Friedl Kubelka vom Gröller		Austria	
Funeral Parade of Roses	Toshio Matsumoto	Shinnosuke Ikehata, Yoshio Tsuchiya	Japan	Black and white
Invocation of My Demon Brother	Kenneth Anger	Kenneth Anger, Mick Jagger	United States	Music composed by Mick Jagger
Katzelmacher	Rainer Werner Fassbinder	Hanna Schygulla, Lilith Ungerer, Rudolf Waldemar Brem	West Germany	Black and white
Lemon	Hollis Frampton		United States	
Love Is Colder Than Death	Rainer Werner Fassbinder	Rainer Werner Fassbinder, Hanna Schygulla, Ulli Lommel	West Germany	Black and white
My Name Is Oona	Gunvor Nelson		United States	
Note to Pati	Saul Levine		United States	
Paradigm	B. S. Johnson	William Hoyland	United Kingdom	
Our Lady of the Sphere	Larry Jordan		United States	
Precautions Against Fanatics	Werner Herzog		West Germany	Spoof documentary
Room	Peter Gidal		United Kingdom	Structural film
Scenes from Under Childhood, Section One	Stan Brakhage		United States	Part of Scenes from Under Childhood cycle
Scenes from Under Childhood, Section Three	Stan Brakhage		United States	Part of Scenes from Under Childhood cycle
Scenes from Under Childhood, Section Two	Stan Brakhage		United States	Part of Scenes from Under Childhood cycle
Song 27 (Part II) Rivers	Stan Brakhage		United States	Part of Songs cycle
Song 28	Stan Brakhage		United States	Part of Songs cycle
Song 29	Stan Brakhage		United States	Part of Songs cycle
Time & Fortune Vietnam Newsreel	Jonas Mekas	Adolfas Mekas	United States	
Tom, Tom, the Piper's Son	Ken Jacobs		United States	
Up Yours Too, Guillaume Apollinaire!	B. S. Johnson		United Kingdom	Short animation
Tales	Cassandra Gerstein, Andrea Loomis, Gail Porter		United States	Made by an all-female crew
Window Suite of Children's Songs	Stan Brakhage		United States	Part of Songs cycle
