= List of avant-garde films of the 1980s =

This is a list of avant-garde and experimental films released in the 1980s.

Title	Director	Cast	Nation	Notes
1980
Amor	Robert Beavers		United States	15 mins, Color
Amy!	Laura Mulvey, Peter Wollen		United Kingdom	
Duplicity III	Stan Brakhage		United States	Part of Duplicity cycle
Germany, Pale Mother	Helma Sanders-Brahms	Eva Mattes, Ernst Jacobi, Elisabeth Stepanek	West Germany	
Lucifer Rising	Kenneth Anger		United States	
Made Manifest	Stan Brakhage		United States	
Other	Stan Brakhage		United States	
Robert Haller’s Wedding	Jonas Mekas	Robert A. Haller, Amy Greenfield	United States	3 mins, Color
Roman Numeral: IV	Stan Brakhage		United States	Part of Roman Numeral Series (also called the "Romans")
Roman Numeral: V	Stan Brakhage		United States	Part of Roman Numeral Series (also called the "Romans")
Roman Numeral: VI	Stan Brakhage		United States	Part of Roman Numeral Series (also called the "Romans")
Roman Numeral: VII	Stan Brakhage		United States	Part of Roman Numeral Series (also called the "Romans")
Salome	Stan Brakhage		United States	
Self-Portrait	Jonas Mekas	Jonas Mekas	United States	20 mins, Color
Sincerity V	Stan Brakhage		United States	Part of Sincerity cycle
1981
Aftermath	Stan Brakhage		United States	
Arabic Numeral Series 1	Stan Brakhage		United States	Part of Arabic Numeral Series (also called the "Arabics")
Arabic Numeral Series 2	Stan Brakhage		United States	Part of Arabic Numeral Series (also called the "Arabics")
Arabic Numeral Series 3	Stan Brakhage		United States	Part of Arabic Numeral Series (also called the "Arabics")
Arabic Numeral Series 4	Stan Brakhage		United States	Part of Arabic Numeral Series (also called the "Arabics")
Arabic Numeral Series 5	Stan Brakhage		United States	Part of Arabic Numeral Series (also called the "Arabics")
Arabic Numeral Series 6	Stan Brakhage		United States	Part of Arabic Numeral Series (also called the "Arabics")
Arabic Numeral Series 7	Stan Brakhage		United States	Part of Arabic Numeral Series (also called the "Arabics")
Arabic Numeral Series 8	Stan Brakhage		United States	Part of Arabic Numeral Series (also called the "Arabics")
Arabic Numeral Series 9	Stan Brakhage		United States	Part of Arabic Numeral Series (also called the "Arabics")
Arabic Numeral Series 0 + 10	Stan Brakhage		United States	Part of Arabic Numeral Series (also called the "Arabics")
Arabic Numeral Series 11	Stan Brakhage		United States	Part of Arabic Numeral Series (also called the "Arabics")
Arabic Numeral Series 12	Stan Brakhage		United States	Part of Arabic Numeral Series (also called the "Arabics")
Arabic Numeral Series 13	Stan Brakhage		United States	Part of Arabic Numeral Series (also called the "Arabics")
The Garden of Earthly Delights	Stan Brakhage		United States	
Murder Psalm	Stan Brakhage		United States	
No Mercy, No Future	Helma Sanders-Brahms	Elisabeth Stepanek, Jorge Reis, Curt Curtini	West Germany	
Nodes	Stan Brakhage		United States	
Le Pont du Nord	Jacques Rivette	Bulle Ogier, Pascale Ogier, Pierre Clémenti	France	
Possession	Andrzej Żuławski	Isabelle Adjani, Sam Neill, Heinz Bennent	France; West Germany	
Roman Numeral: VIII	Stan Brakhage		United States	Part of Roman Numeral Series (also called the "Romans")
Roman Numeral: IX	Stan Brakhage		United States	Part of Roman Numeral Series (also called the "Romans")
RR	Stan Brakhage		United States	
Stonebridge Park	Patrick Keiller		United Kingdom	
T.G.: Psychic Rally in Heaven	Derek Jarman		United Kingdom	Short
The Song of Stockholm	Jonas Mekas		United States	Travel Songs series, 5 mins, Color
Tango	Zbigniew Rybczyński		Poland	
Travel Songs	Jonas Mekas		United States	Travel Songs series, 25 mins, Color
Unconscious London Strata	Stan Brakhage		United States	
1982
The Angel	Patrick Bokanowski	Maurice Baquet, Jean-Marie Bon, Martine Couture	France	
Arabic Numeral Series 14	Stan Brakhage		United States	Part of Arabic Numeral Series (also called the "Arabics")
Arabic Numeral Series 15	Stan Brakhage		United States	Part of Arabic Numeral Series (also called the "Arabics")
Arabic Numeral Series 16	Stan Brakhage		United States	Part of Arabic Numeral Series (also called the "Arabics")
Arabic Numeral Series 17	Stan Brakhage		United States	Part of Arabic Numeral Series (also called the "Arabics")
Arabic Numeral Series 18	Stan Brakhage		United States	Part of Arabic Numeral Series (also called the "Arabics")
Arabic Numeral Series 19	Stan Brakhage		United States	Part of Arabic Numeral Series (also called the "Arabics")
The Atomic Café	Jayne Loader, Kevin Rafferty		United States	
Baby Doll	Tessa Hughes-Freeland		United States	
Chronopolis	Piotr Kamler		Poland	
Dimension of Dialogue	Jan Švankmajer		Czechoslovakia	
The Draughtsman's Contract	Peter Greenaway		United Kingdom	
Hours for Jerome	Nathaniel Dorsky		United States	
In Order to Pass	Chris Kraus		United States	
Macbeth	Béla Tarr	György Cserhalmi, Erzsébet Kútvölgyi, Ferenc Bencze, Imre Csuja, János Derzsi, István Dégi, Attila Kaszás, Gyula Maár, Đoko Rosić, János Ács, Lajos Őze	Hungary	Drama
Koyaanisqatsi	Godfrey Reggio		United States	
Liquid Sky	Slava Tsukerman	Anne Carlisle, Paula E. Sheppard, Susan Doukas	United States	Sci-Fi
Personal Cuts	Sanja Iveković		Yugoslavia	
Pictures on Pink Paper	Lis Rhodes		United Kingdom	
Shift	Toshio Matsumoto		Japan	
Three Crowns of the Sailor	Raúl Ruiz	Jean-Bernard Guillard, Philippe Deplanche, Jean Badin	France	
1983
La Belle captive	Alain Robbe-Grillet	Daniel Mesguich, Gabrielle Lazure, Cyrielle Claire	France	
City of Lost Souls	Rosa von Praunheim		West Germany	
Cosey Fanni Tutti	Doobie Eylath	Cosey Fanni Tutti	United Kingdom	
Cup/Saucer/Two Dancers/Radio	Jonas Mekas	Kenneth King, Phoebe Neville	United States	23 mins, Color
Diary	David Perlov		Israel	TV series
Efpsychi	Robert Beavers		United States	20 mins, Color
First Name: Carmen	Jean-Luc Godard	Maruschka Detmers, Jacques Bonnaffé, Myriem Roussel	France; Switzerland	
Freeze Frame	Peter Tscherkassky		Austria	
Hell Spit Flexion	Stan Brakhage		United States	Part of The Dante Quartet
Messages	Guy Sherwiin		United Kingdom	
No End	Sanja Iveković, Dalibor Martinis		Yugoslavia	
Norwood	Patrick Keiller		United Kingdom	
Pneuma	Nathaniel Dorsky		United States	
Sans soleil	Chris Marker	Florence Delay	France	
Street Songs	Jonas Mekas	The Living Theatre	France	10 mins, Color
Sweet Bunch	Nikos Nikolaidis	Despina Tomazani, Dora Maskalvanou, Takis Moschos	Greece	
Syntagma	Valie Export	Irmilin Hoffer	Austria	
Videodrome	David Cronenberg	James Woods, Debbie Harry	USA	
1984
Blue Monday	The Duvet Brothers		United Kingdom	
The Cabinet of Jan Švankmajer	Stephen Quay, Timothy Quay		United Kingdom	
Egyptian Series	Stan Brakhage		United States	
The Future of Emily	Helma Sanders-Brahms	Brigitte Fossey, Camille Raymond, Hermann Treusch	West Germany	
The Green Witch and Merry Diana	Grayson Perry		United Kingdom	
Ian Breakwell's Continuous Diary	Ian Breakwell		United Kingdom	TV series
Klassenverhältnisse	Straub-Huillet	Christian Heinisch, Mario Adorf, Nazzareno Bianconi	West Germany; France	Drama
Shut the Fuck Up	General Idea		Canada	
Tortured Dust Part I	Stan Brakhage		United States	
Tortured Dust Part II	Stan Brakhage		United States	
Tortured Dust Part III	Stan Brakhage		United States	
Tortured Dust Part IV	Stan Brakhage		United States	
1985
2084	Chris Marker		France	
The Angelic Conversation	Derek Jarman	Judi Dench, Paul Reynolds, Philip Williamson	United Kingdom	
The Epic of Gilgamesh	Stephen Quay, Timothy Quay		United Kingdom	
Les Favoris de la Lune	Otar Iosseliani	Pascal Aubier, Alix de Montaigu, Gaspard Flori	France; Italy	
Hail Mary	Jean-Luc Godard	Myriem Roussel, Thierry Rode, Philippe Lacoste	France; United Kingdom; Switzerland	
Jane	Stan Brakhage		United States	
The Monument of Sacrifice and Orgy	Ana Nuša Dragan, Srečo Dragan		Yugoslavia	
The Practice of Love	Valie Export	Adelheid Arndt, Hagnot Elischka, Rüdiger Vogler	Austria	
The Right Side of My Brain	Richard Kern, Lydia Lunch		United States	
Signal—Germany on the Air	Ernie Gehr		United States	
Super-8 Girl Games	Ursula Pürrer, Hans A. Scheirl		Austria	
Where Evil Dwells	Tommy Turner, David Wojnarowicz		United States	
Wingseed	Robert Beavers		United States	15 mins, Color
A Zed & Two Noughts	Peter Greenaway	Andréa Ferréol, Brian Deacon, Eric Deacon	Netherlands; United Kingdom	
1986
The Aerodyne	Stan Brakhage		United States	Part of the "Caswallon Trilogy"
Caravaggio	Derek Jarman	Sean Bean, Tilda Swinton, Nigel Terry	United Kingdom	
Confession	Stan Brakhage		United States	
Dance Shadows by Danielle Helander	Stan Brakhage		United States	Part of the "Caswallon Trilogy"
The End	Patrick Keiller		United Kingdom	
The Family Album	Alan Berliner		United States	
Fingered	Richard Kern, Lydia Lunch		United States	
Fireloop	Stan Brakhage		United States	Part of the "Caswallon Trilogy"
Foolproof Illusion	Chris Kraus		United States	
Handsworth Songs	Black Audio Film Collective		United Kingdom	
He Stands in a Desert Counting the Seconds of His Life	Jonas Mekas		United States	149 mins, Color, Collage film
Kelimba	Peter Tscherkassky		Austria	
The Loom	Stan Brakhage		United States	Part of the "Caswallon Trilogy"
Mommy, Mommy, Where's My Brain?	Jon Moritsugu		United States	
Nidhiyude Katha	Vijayakrishnan		India	
Night Music	Stan Brakhage		United States	Part of the "Three Handed-Painted Films"
Street of Crocodiles	Stephen Quay, Timothy Quay		United Kingdom	
Thames Film	William Raban	John Hurt	United Kingdom	
Toutes les femmes est Jeanne d'Arc	Suzanne Lemaître		France	
1987
17 Reasons Why	Nathaniel Dorsky		United States	
Alaya	Nathaniel Dorsky		United States	
All Our Secrets are Contained in an Image	Breda Beban, Hrvoje Horvatić		Yugoslavia	
The Black Tower	John Smith		United Kingdom	
Cruel Illness of Men	Igor Aleinikov		Soviet Union	
The Cure for Insomnia	John Henry Timmis IV		United States	
The Dante Quartet	Stan Brakhage		United States	Part of The Dante Quartet
The Deadman	Peggy Ahwesh, Keith Sanborn		United States	
Dream	Dmitrii Frolov		Soviet Union	
Faustfilm: An Opera: Part I	Stan Brakhage		United States	Part of the Faustfilm Project
From the Archives of Modern Art	Eleanor Antin		United States	
How to Shoot a Crime	Chris Kraus, Sylvère Lotringer		United States	
Kindgering	Stan Brakhage		United States	
The Last of England	Derek Jarman	Tilda Swinton, Spencer Leigh, Spring (Mark Adley)	United Kingdom	
Loud Visual Noises	Stan Brakhage		United States	
Morning Patrol	Nikos Nikolaidis	Michele Valley, Takis Spiridakis, Liana Hatzi	Greece	
The Revolutionary Sketch	Gleb Aleinikov, Igor Aleinikov		Soviet Union	
Traktora	Gleb Aleinikov, Igor Aleinikov		Soviet Union	
1988
Alice	Jan Švankmajer	Kristina Kohoutova	Switzerland; Czechoslovakia	
Degrees of Blindness	Cerith Wyn Evans		United Kingdom	
Treasure Island	David Cherkassky		Soviet Union	Animated/life-action TV film
Faust 3: Candida Albacore	Stan Brakhage		United States	Part of the Faustfilm Project
Faust's Other: An Idyll	Stan Brakhage		United States	Part of the Faustfilm Project
I... Dreaming	Stan Brakhage		United States	
The Limits of Vision	Clio Barnard		United Kingdom	
Marilyn's Window	Stan Brakhage		United States	
Matins	Stan Brakhage		United States	
Measures of Distance	Mona Hatoun		United Kingdom	
Powaqqatsi	Godfrey Reggio		United States	
Rage Net	Stan Brakhage		United States	Part of the Three Hand-Painted Films
Virile Games	Jan Švankmajer		Czechoslovakia	
1989
Babylon Series #1	Stan Brakhage		United States	
Begotten	E. Elias Merhige	Brian Salzberg, Donna Dempsey, Stephen Charles Barry	United States	Experimental horror
Clownery	Dmitrii Frolov	Dmitri Shibanov, Dmitri Frolov, Natalya Sourkova, Alexey Zaharov, Viktoriya Zlotnikova, Mark Nahamkin, Yevgeniy Suhonenkov, Alexey Frolov, Alexandr Kostin, Yakov Shmayev, Vyacheslav Gridin	Soviet Union	
The Clouds	Patrick Keiller		United Kingdom	
Ecce Homo	Jerry Tartaglia		United States	
Faust 4	Stan Brakhage		United States	Part of the Faustfilm Project
Looking for Langston	Isaac Julien		United Kingdom	
Marquis	Henri Xhonneux	Francois Marthouret, Valerie Kling, Michel Robin	Belgium; France	
Santa Sangre	Alejandro Jodorowsky	Axel Jodorowsky, Blanca Guerra, Sabrina Dennison	Italy; Mexico	
Tabula Rasa	Peter Tscherkassky		Austria	
Tetsuo: The Iron Man	Shinya Tsukamoto	Tomoroh Taguchi, Kei Fujiwara, Shinya Tsukamoto	Japan	
Visions in Meditation #1	Stan Brakhage		United States	Part of the Visions in Meditation Cycle
Visions in Meditation #2: Mesa Verde	Stan Brakhage		United States	Part of the Visions in Meditation Cycle
The Window	Julius Ziz		Soviet Union	
