= Sirius Remembered =

- Directed by: Stan Brakhage
- Release date: 1959
- Running time: 11 minutes
- Country: United States
- Language: Silent

Sirius Remembered is a 1959 American experimental short film directed by Stan Brakhage. It captures the gradual decomposition of the corpse of Sirius, the Brakhage family's dog, over the course of several months.

== Description ==
The film is divided into three parts. The first shows the relatively undisturbed corpse of Sirius, the second is in winter when the body is covered in snow, and the third shows the decay as it thaws in spring. An increasing number of superimpositions are added over the course of the film.

== Production ==
The Brakhage family's dog Sirius died after being hit by a car. Because of Brakhage's wife Jane's beliefs about death, they opted to place the body in the forest instead of burying it. They laid the corpse beneath a tree not far from their home in Princeton, New Jersey. Because of the winter temperatures, it decomposed very little, and Stan was dismayed to be able to still see the corpse from behind their house. He filmed the corpse repeatedly, usually from mid-distance, working with a handheld 16 mm camera that enabled him to freely gesture while filming. Jane described it to him as a way of bringing movement back to it through camera movements and uprighting it through the camera angle. The last footage was shot in spring, following a visit from Parker Tyler and Charles Boultenhouse who had walked past the area without visibly noticing Sirius's corpse.

After moving to Colorado, Stan edited Sirius Remembered while also beginning to shoot footage for Dog Star Man. Upon seeing the images he was editing, Jane became upset, saying that they made her "feel dirty." This prompted Stan to seek an editing style that would create "an enclosed form" for the images of decay such that they would not directly engage viewers.

== Analysis ==
Sirius Remembered is influenced by the work of Gertrude Stein, to which Brakhage had been introduced by poet Robert Duncan. He pointed to her idea that repetition of a word cannot truly exist, as each subsequent appearance produces a new word based on its context.

Many of the motifs from Sirius Remembered were further developed in Brakhage's Dog Star Man series. The series revisits the themes of the connection between a man and his dog and the slow processes of death and decay. The panning shots from the corpse up to a tree led to the series' image of the white tree. Fred Camper notes that Brakhage's 1971 film The Act of Seeing with One's Own Eyes also uses corpse imagery toward poetic aims, linking its shot of a face being removed from a human skull during an autopsy to the fleeting appearances of Sirius's skull. He contrasts how these images function in the two films, with Sirius's appearance acting as an interruption of the camera movements and the autopsies in The Act of Seeing acting as episodic narratives.

== Critical reception ==
Ernest Callenbach responded negatively to the film, describing Brakhage's cinematography and editing as "jittery…like the effect of a 33rpm record of Webern being played at 78rpm." David Remnick wrote favorably of it in a review for The Washington Post, calling it "so astonishing [in] its craftsmanship that the viewer…tends to forget the grisly object before him." The Los Angeles Times writer Reed Johnson wrote that its fragmented, looping imagery "becomes a lovely, impressionistic memento mori." Sirius Remembered is now part of Anthology Film Archives' Essential Cinema Repertory collection.
