= Thanatopsis (disambiguation) =

Thanatopsis may refer to:

In literature:

- "Thanatopsis," a poem by William Cullen Bryant.

In film:

- Thanatopsis (film), an experimental film by Ed Emshwiller

In music:

- Thanatopsis, an American progressive rock band featuring musician Buckethead
- The Coming Dawn (Thanatopsis), a song written by Kerry Livgrin and recorded by Kansas (band) on their "Somewhere to Elsewhere" album
