= Sexual Meditation: Room with View =

- Directed by: Stan Brakhage
- Release date: 1971
- Running time: 4 minutes
- Country: United States
- Language: Silent

Sexual Meditation: Room with View is a 1971 American experimental short directed by Stan Brakhage. Shot on 16 mm film, the film explores the often blurry nature of gender roles in the copulatory ritual.

It is the second film in the Sexual Meditations cycle, with #1: Motel being shot in 1970.

== Plot synopsis ==
A naked woman is seen sitting on a chair in a room with view. The woman is seen from various angles both in proximity to the camera itself and lying near the open window with her rear exposed towards the audience. This leads the audience to wonder whether the title implies that said view is what lies through the window or is in fact the unclothed woman herself. At this point, a naked man is seen on the same chair as at the opening squatting up and down suggestive of a tantric sex position. His conspicuous distinctness from the female character is evocative of the sexual incompleteness characteristic of Brakhage and his contemporaries. Next, the woman is seen again engaging in a bout of quick pirouettes signifying the lightness with which her gender approaches the mating game. At the climax of the film, the man repeatedly leaps both from the chair and towards the mattress with the intention of conquering the female.

== Critical reception ==
A review in The Village Voice described the film as "pyrotechnically stunning and suffused with sexual excitement." Critic Fred Camper noted similarities with Brakhage's later film The Wold Shadow, which is also structured around a static camera angle that begins as an apparently unaltered image before introducing transformations to it.
