= Blue Moses =

Blue Moses may refer to:

- Blue Moses (film), a 1962 experimental film by Stan Brakhage
- Blue Moses (album), a 1972 jazz album by Randy Weston
