= Unglassed Windows Cast a Terrible Reflection =

- Directed by: Stan Brakhage
- Produced by: Paul Ihrig
- Starring: Larry Jordan; Yvonne Fair
- Music by: James Tenney
- Distributed by: Kino International
- Release date: 1953
- Running time: 29 minutes
- Country: United States
- Language: English

Unglassed Windows Cast a Terrible Reflection is a 1953 American short film directed by Stan Brakhage. Shot while in Brakhage's native Denver, the film stars Larry Jordan (credited as Lawrence Jordan) who later went on to become a film director. Filming was done in Nevadaville, Colorado. Like his other films at the time, it was shot on 16mm film, is black and white and features no dialogue.

== Plot ==
The plot involves four young men and two young women who are out on a drive. After the car breaks down near an abandoned mine, one of the girls begins to explore the mine, while the rivalry between two of her male admirers becomes violent and leads to dire consequences.

== Release ==
The film saw a DVD release in 2007 by Kino on the two disc film collection Avant-Garde 2: Experimental Cinema 1928-1954 alongside Interim, The Way to Shadow Garden and The Extraordinary Child.

== Archive ==
Film elements for Unglassed Windows Cast a Terrible Reflection are held by the Academy Film Archive as part of the Stan Brakhage Collection. The film was preserved by the archive in 2005.

== See also ==
- List of avant-garde films of the 1950s
