= Phil Solomon (filmmaker) =

American filmmaker (1954–2019)

- Born: Philip Stewart Solomon; January 3, 1954; Manhattan, New York City, U.S.
- Died: April 20, 2019 (aged 65) near Boulder, Colorado, U.S.
- Education: Binghamton University Massachusetts College of Art
- Known for: Experimental film, Machinima

Philip Stewart Solomon (January 3, 1954 – April 20, 2019) was an American experimental filmmaker noted for his work with both film and video. In recent years, Solomon had earned acclaim for a series of films that incorporate machinima made using games from the Grand Theft Auto series. His films are often described as haunting and lyrical.

== Biography ==
Originally from New York City, Solomon attended Binghamton University and received a Masters of Fine Arts from the Massachusetts College of Art. One of Solomon's instructors was the experimental filmmaker Ken Jacobs, who started his first class with a screening of Tony Conrad's film The Flicker. Solomon initially disliked the film, but the experience, followed by a screening of his future collaborator Stan Brakhage's Blue Moses, had a profound impact on his development as a filmmaker. Another formative experience came in the form of a lecture by critic Fred Camper on Brakhage's Anticipation of the Night.

Solomon began making films in 1975. He later destroyed some of his early works, many of which were made in imitation of Brakhage.

== Career ==
Solomon was an associate of the influential American experimental filmmaker Stan Brakhage, with whom he taught film at the University of Colorado at Boulder. Solomon and Brakhage collaborated on three films. In a 1992 poll for the British film magazine Sight & Sound, Brakhage picked Solomon's Remains to Be Seen as one of the ten greatest films of all time. The film had previously been selected as one of the top ten films of 1989 by the Village Voice.

Solomon was awarded a Guggenheim Fellowship in 1994. In 2007, he was the recipient of the Thatcher Hoffman Smith Award from the University of Oklahoma. In 2012 Solomon received the Knight Fellowship of the USA (United States Artists) Fellows program, alongside novelist Annie Proulx, sculptor Alison Saar, jazz musician Jack DeJohnette, dancer and choreographer Trisha Brown and artist Theaster Gates.

On April 10, 2010, Solomon's American Falls opened at the Corcoran Gallery of Art in Washington, D.C. The six-projection video/sound installation received great acclaim before closing in July 2010. In conjunction with the Corcoran exhibition, Solomon's career as a filmmaker was explored in "Rhapsodies in Silver," a three-program survey at Washington's National Gallery of Art.

A re-edited, feature-length, single-projection version of American Falls was featured at the New York Film Festival's "Views from the Avant Garde" on October 1, 2010. The single projection version of the film condenses the original multi-projector format into a triptych, placing three independent (yet associative) images next to one another. In Fall 2012, Solomon screened a three-channel version of American Falls at the Museum of the Moving Image in Astoria, New York, as part of the exhibition "Film After Film."

In the May/June 2010 Film Comment poll, The Top 50 Avant-Garde Filmmakers of the Decade, Phil Solomon placed at number 5, tied with his late colleague, Stan Brakhage.

Solomon died on April 20, 2019, from complications following surgery at the age of 65.

== Preservation ==
Solomon's films have been housed at the Academy Film Archive since 2005, and they have preserved several of his films, including As If We Twilight Psalm I: The Lateness of the Hour and What's Out Tonight Is Lost.

== Filmography ==
Year	Title	Notes	Ref(s).
1979-1980	The Passage of the Bride		
1980	Nocturne		
1983	What's Out Tonight Is Lost		
1988	The Secret Garden		
1989/1994	The Exquisite Hour		
1989/1994	Remains to Be Seen		
1992	Clepsydra		
1994	Elementary Phrases	with Stan Brakhage	
1995	The Snowman		
1996	Concrescence	with Stan Brakhage	
1999	Psalm I: "The Lateness of the Hour"		
1999	Psalm II: "Walking Distance"		
2000-2012	American Falls		
2002	Psalm III: "Night of the Meek"		
2002	Seasons...	with Stan Brakhage	
2005	Crossroad	with Mark LaPore	
2007	Rehearsals for Retirement		
2007	Last Days In a Lonely Place		
2008	Still Raining, Still Dreaming		
2013	The Emblazoned Apparitions		
2013	Psalm IV: "Valley of the Shadow"		
