= I... Dreaming =

- A screenshot from I... Dreaming, showing the words "my heart" scratched directly onto the film emulsion
- Directed by: Stan Brakhage
- Release date: 1988
- Running time: 8 minutes
- Country: United States
- Language: English

I... Dreaming is an experimental short film by Stan Brakhage, released in 1988. The film features a soundtrack of Stephen Foster songs, composed by Joel Haertling.

== Production ==
I... Dreaming was described by Brakhage as "extremely autobiographical," and was produced at one of the lowest points in his life, following his separation from wife Jane. Unlike most of the director's works, the film features a soundtrack. Brakhage took a "collage" of Stephen Foster songs, composed by Joel Haertling, and set images to the music. The soundtrack often "jumps" abruptly from one musical phrase or song to another.

Brakhage also scratched chosen song lyrics, such as "sweet spirit" and "see the dark void," directly onto the film emulsion. The visuals interchange between images of Brakhage, appearing a weary old man, and the restless movements of his grandchildren, sometimes captured with a time-lapse camera. The film is composed of "small, minimalist images" and often uses a steady, mounted camera.

== Reception ==
I... Dreaming is often commented upon for its use of soundtrack, an atypical element in Brakhage's work. The film has been likened to the director's earlier "trance films," such as The Way to Shadow Garden (1954) and Reflections on Black (1955), as well as the work of contemporaries Maya Deren, Kenneth Anger, and Gregory Markopoulos. Malcolm Cook, writing for Senses of Cinema, described I... Dreaming as "an emotional experience." Laurel Gildersleeve writes that the film "elicits a melancholy and cold emptiness," and communicates the loss of vitality that comes with growing older. R. Bruce Elder considered the film significant in Brakhage's oeuvre, in that it, alone among Brakhage’s work, challenges the idea of “mind as creating the world anew, with every passing moment, in a triumphant act of the imagination.” Fred Camper praised the imagery of I... Dreaming' as "poetic and suggestive," and interpreted the scratching of phrases as Brakhage acknowledging the impossibility of transcending his sadness.
