= Commingled Containers =

- A screenshot from Commingled Containers, showing underwater patterns
- Directed by: Stan Brakhage
- Release date: 1997
- Running time: 3 minutes
- Country: United States
- Language: Silent

Commingled Containers is an experimental short film by Stan Brakhage, produced in 1997.

== Production ==
In the several years preceding 1997, Brakhage had, for financial reasons, moved away from photography and produced most of his work by painting directly onto celluloid. In 1997, Brakhage was diagnosed with bladder cancer. Just prior to exploratory surgery, Brakhage purchased a Bolex camera, which he used to produce Commingled Containers, described as a "last testament" of sorts. He immersed his camera into the waters of Boulder Creek, Colorado to capture the patterns created by the friction between water and rock.

== Reception ==
Commingled Containers is often interpreted in light of Brakhage's health problems at the time, and is considered to represent the director's own spiritual quest. Scott MacDonald describes the film as "a talisman that expresses Brakhage’s determination to continue his spiritual quest and to offer viewers something of Light, despite his fear of mortality, for as long as it was given to him to remain in the flow of life." R. Bruce Elder wrote that Commingled Containers, unlike most of Brakhage's work, "remains a nearly organic (or biomorphic) abstraction across its entire length."
