= Eye Myth =

1967 film by Stan Brakhage

- Screenshot from Eye Myth, revealing the "hidden" image of a man
- Directed by: Stan Brakhage
- Release date: 1967
- Running time: 9 seconds
- Country: United States

Eye Myth is an experimental short film by Stan Brakhage, produced in 1967. The film has a running time of only nine seconds, but took about a year to produce.

== Production ==
Brakhage described the film's title as follows:

In the eyes, constantly, the eyes are flaring with little...stories, little forms and shapes, some of which are quite disturbing, like the swastika...The little myth that's made up of bits and pieces of painted things onto a piece of film that's called an Eye Myth. In other words, it's not a word myth; myth means mouth, actually...but an Eye Myth is kind of beautifully oxymoronic.

Eye Myth's abstract style, achieved by painting images directly onto the film cells, was inspired when Brakhage was diagnosed with a condition causing rapid eye movement. In producing the film, he hoped to achieve a nervous system feedback "through the physiology of the proximity of the eye and the brain". Eye Myth took Brakhage about a year to produce. He attributes the film's lengthy production period to his being skeptical that "you could make a myth that was just vision,” a doubt that was resolved only by actually "doing it." Brakhage described the film, despite its short length, as being "intrinsically epic." Brakhage has screened Eye Myth alongside Jan Troell's The Emigrants, and argued that "if you give it a chance, the weight of this nine-second film will balance the length of Treoll's film." Brakhage later re-edited images from Eye Myth into the 26-minute work The Horseman, the Woman and the Moth (1968), and the two-minute long Eye Myth Educational (1972).

== Release ==
Eye Myth was first released in 16mm format in 1972, but was not screened in its intended 35mm format until the Telluride Film Festival in 1981. The film was released on DVD and Blu-ray as part of the Criterion Collection's By Brakhage: An Anthology.

== Reception ==
Critic Jeremy Heilman writes that "every viewer will find their own interpretation, whether it be one that's profound, based entirely on the film's aesthetics, or essentially meaningless." Jake Euker, writing for PopMatters, described Eye Myth as "a key work in which Brakhage's abstract, painted film technique comes to the fore."

== Preservation ==
The Academy Film Archive preserved Eye Myth in 2012.

== See also ==
- List of American films of 1967
