= Fire of Waters =

- Directed by: Stan Brakhage
- Release date: 1965
- Running time: 10 minutes
- Country: United States
- Language: English

Fire of Waters is an experimental short film by Stan Brakhage, produced in 1965.

== Production ==
Fire of Waters was inspired by a letter Brakhage received from poet Robert Kelly, in which was written: "The truth of the matter is this that: man lives in a fire of waters and will eternally in the first taste." Brakhage intended the film as "a play of light and sounds" on that theme. The film contains footage shot in a lightning storm with a jerky handheld camera, occasionally showing the panes of the window through which the footage was filmed. Unlike much of the director's work, Fire of Waters contains a soundtrack, which has been described as "mushy, noisy and largely ambiguous - maybe rain, maybe paper rustling, maybe just dirt and water spots on the optical soundtrack." The soundtrack actually consists of slowed down bird calls, wind, and speeded up audio of Jane Brakhage giving birth to daughter Myrenna (an event originally documented, albeit silently, in Brakhage's film Window Water Baby Moving).

== Reception ==
David E. James described Fire of Waters as one of Brakhage's most interesting films, in large part due to its use of sound. Phil Solomon's experimental film Night Lights was inspired by Fire of Waters. Daniel Barnett, in his book Movement as meaning: in experimental film, wrote of his first encounter with Fire of Waters, "I can't ever remember art making me so angry," citing the film's apparent incomprehensibility on initial viewing.

== Archive ==
Film elements for Fire of Waters are held by the Academy Film Archive as part of the Stan Brakhage Collection. The film was preserved by the archive in 2018.

== See also ==
- List of American films of 1965
