= Arabic Numeral Series =

1981–82 American short films

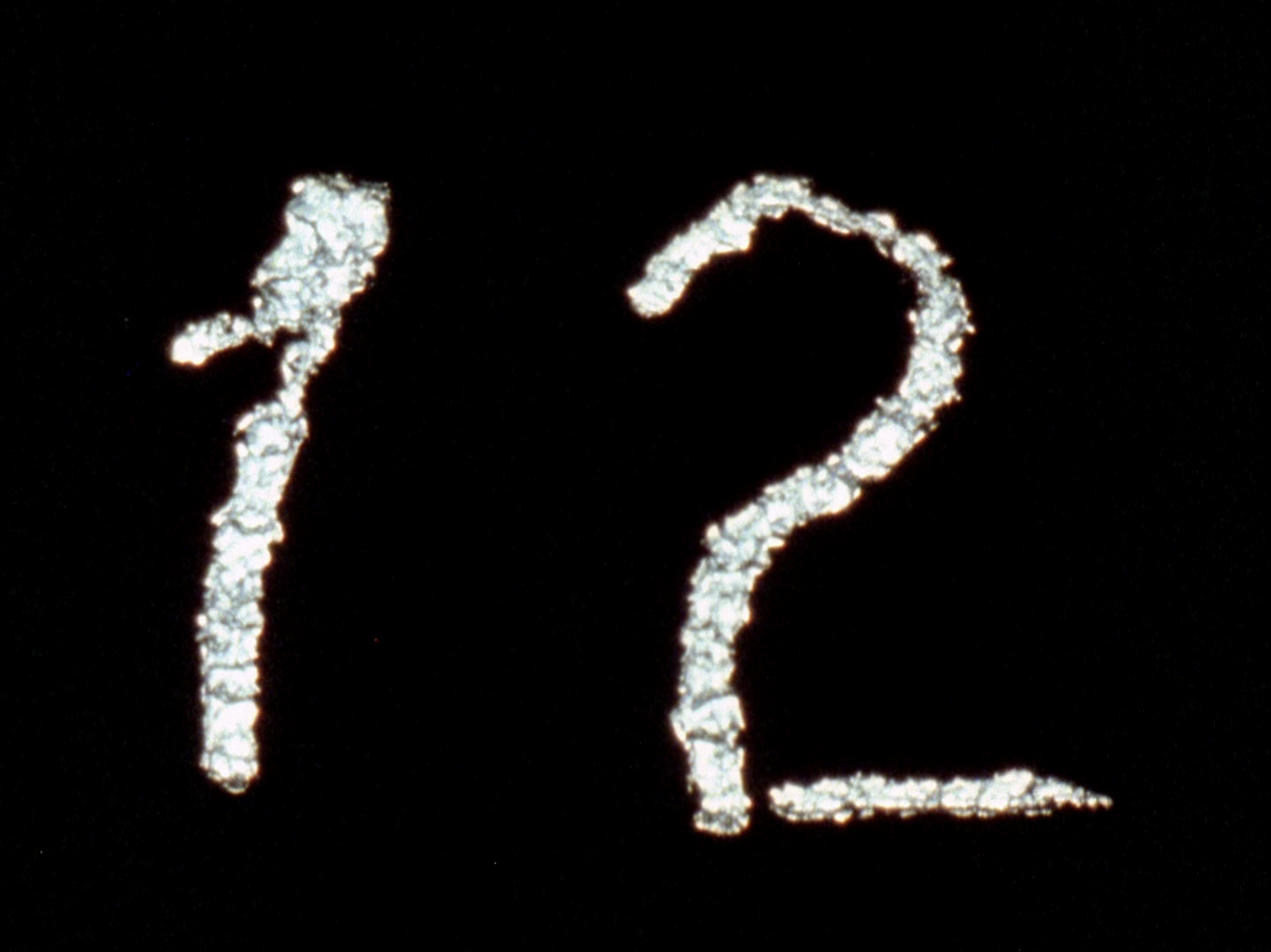
- Title from Arabic 12 (1981)
- Directed by: Stan Brakhage
- Cinematography: Stan Brakhage
- Running time: 196 minutes total
- Country: United States

The Arabic Numeral Series, sometimes referred to as the Arabics, is a series of 19 short 16mm films completed by the American experimental filmmaker Stan Brakhage in 1981 and 1982. The Arabic Numeral Series gets its name from the fact that none of the films included in it have titles, instead opening with an arabic numeral. Brakhage produced another cycle, the Roman Numeral Series, whose films all have Roman numerals instead of titles, around the same time. All of the Arabics are silent and are intended to be projected at 18 frames per second.

Writing in a 1997 introduction to a screening of the complete cycle, film critic Fred Camper referred to the Arabics as being the "richest" of the filmmaker's 1980s cycles, explaining: "With some exceptions, the Arabics take the idea of the void as their ground. That is, the light we do see almost always seems to be set against darkness, or occasionally against white, these momentary flickers that materialize tenuously out of emptiness. But the darkness is not 'night,' or even simply some more abstract absence of light, but a more profound vacuum: it represents a world stripped of all the coordinates of the known, an unmeasurable absence. [...] These lushly sensual, pleasurable-to-view films are also terrifying: their unpredictability, continually enacting new dramas of surprise, alternatively swamps the viewer in light and leaves him adrift in darkness. "

== Films ==
Year	Title	Length
1981	1	5½ minutes
1981	2	7 minutes
1981	3	10½ minutes
1981	4	10 minutes
1981	5	5 minutes
1981	6	11 minutes
1981	7	11 minutes
1981	8	7 minutes
1981	9	12 minutes
1981	0 + 10	27½ minutes
1981	11	10½ minutes
1981	12	27 minutes
1981	13	5 minutes
1982	14	5½ minutes
1982	15	7½ minutes
1982	16	8½ minutes
1982	17	8 minutes
1982	18	8½ minutes
1982	19	9 minutes
