= The Act of Seeing with One's Own Eyes =

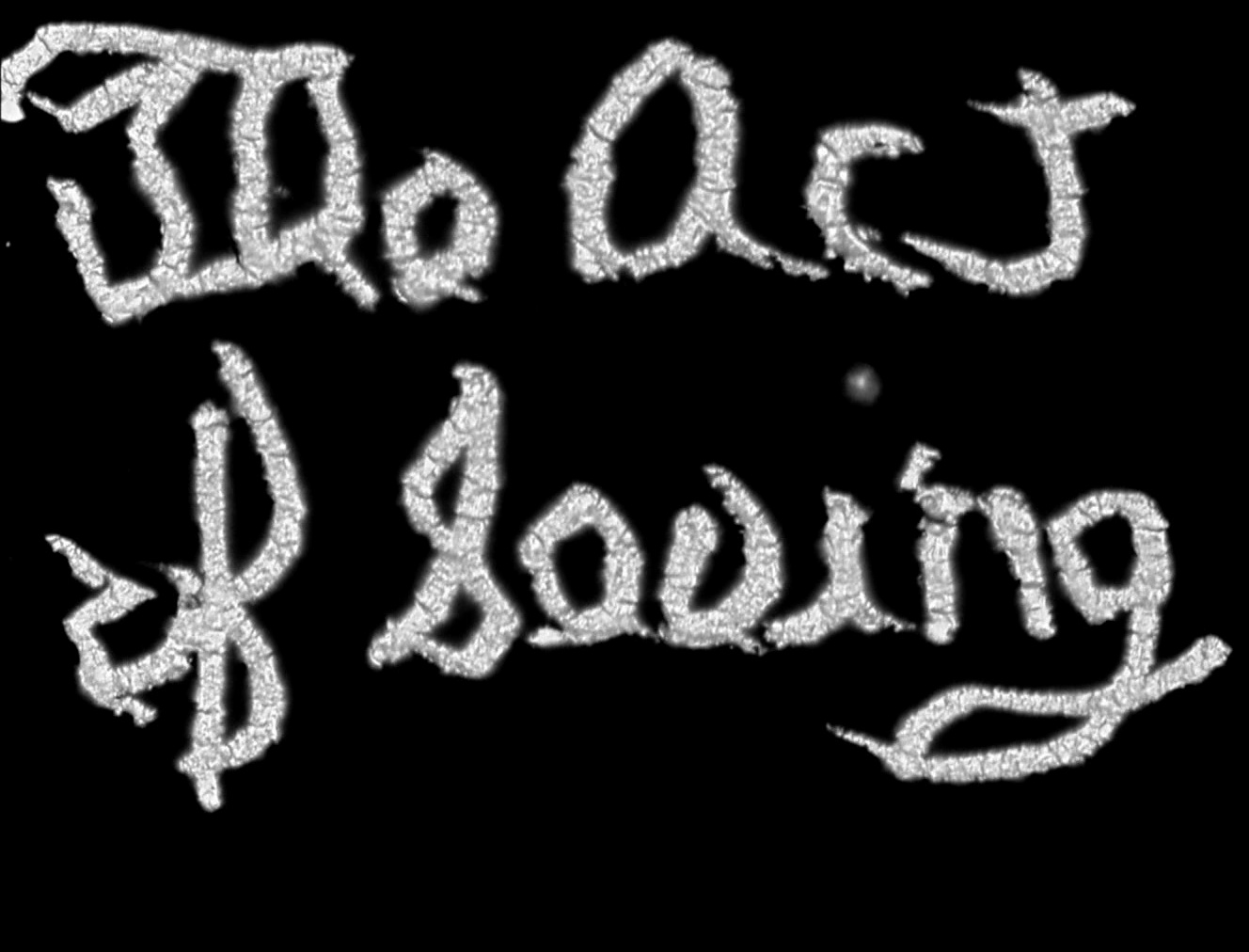
- Directed by: Stan Brakhage
- Cinematography: Stan Brakhage
- Release date: 1971
- Running time: 32 min.
- Country: United States

The Act of Seeing with One's Own Eyes is a 1971 American documentary film by Stan Brakhage. Its title is based on the literal translation of the term autopsy. The film documented the highly graphic autopsy procedures used by forensic pathologists, such as the removal of organs and the embalming process.

The film is part of Brakhage's "Pittsburgh trilogy", a trio of documentary films Brakhage made about the city's institutions in 1971. The other two films are entitled Eyes and Deus Ex. These documentaries are about the police force and a hospital, respectively. American critic Jonathan Rosenbaum referred to The Act of Seeing with One's Own Eyes as "one of the most direct confrontations with death ever recorded on film."

== Production ==
Brakhage shot the documentary using 16-millimetre film without synchronized sound during a visit to a morgue in Pittsburgh. Brakhage used a number of different film stocks in the shooting process.

== Recognition ==
This film has been described as a study in observation and immersion, with one critic deeming Brakhage as a "documentarian of subjectivity", who uses film techniques to "(give) form to his eyesight." This critic argues that the film's primary aim is to "sensitize each viewer to his own subjectivity".

Some critics argued that the silent film style enables viewers to form their own interpretations and judgment on the subject matter. Film critic Fred Camper described the film as "a curious, admittedly creepy, study of the varieties of light reflected off of skin, with luminous fluid appearing to dance with the camera". In a Senses of Cinema profile of Brakhage, film-maker and curator Brian Frye wrote, "The key image of The Act of Seeing With One's Own Eyes is quite likely the bluntest statement on the human condition ever filmed. In the course of an autopsy, the skin around the scalp is slit with a scalpel, and in preparation for exposing and examining the brain, the face of each cadaver is literally peeled off, like a mask, revealing the raw meat beneath. That image, once seen, will never leave you." Martin Smith describes the film as an act of mortality salience, a reminder of the inevitability of death and the joy of being alive. These critiques highlight the shocking, innovative and humane nature of the film.

The Academy Film Archive preserved all three films in 2010.

== See also ==
- List of American films of 1971
- Stan Brakhage filmography
