= The Text of Light =

- Directed by: Stan Brakhage
- Cinematography: Stan Brakhage
- Distributed by: New York Filmmakers Cooperative; Canyon Cinema
- Release date: October 26, 1974
- Running time: 67 minutes
- Country: United States

The Text of Light is a 1974 American experimental film directed by Stan Brakhage.

== Synopsis ==
Time-lapse photography of books, paintings, reflections, and light falling on textures, shot entirely through a glass ashtray.

== Reception ==
The film premiered at the Carnegie Museum of Art on October 26, 1974, as the museum's first program in the Sarah Scaife Gallery. Jonas Mekas described it as a "Cathedral of Light" which "is made up of little fragments of refracted light, fluctuating with tiny movements, and sometimes swift movements." Take One reviewer Bob Cowan panned it, calling it "a kind of visual Muzak" in which "any subtlety of movement within the frame is destroyed by shaky camera movements and abrupt cutting." The film is considered an "epistemological meditation": "This uncommon lens [that is the glass ashtray] generates an equally uncommon image of the world. The density and shape of the glass subtracts linear perspective from the visual field. In this respect, the ash-tray takes up part of the function of rapid camera movements and zooms in other Brakhage films insofar as the ash-tray demolishes perspective. As well, in Text of Light objects lose their individuation, their outlines blurred in masses of light and color." A presentation by Jonathan P. Watts for the Tate underlines the influence of Turner on this film: "In The Text of Light Turner’s influence is felt in the experimental use of colour, and is similarly visionary in the way it collapses naturalistic pictorial space."
