= Scenes from Under Childhood =

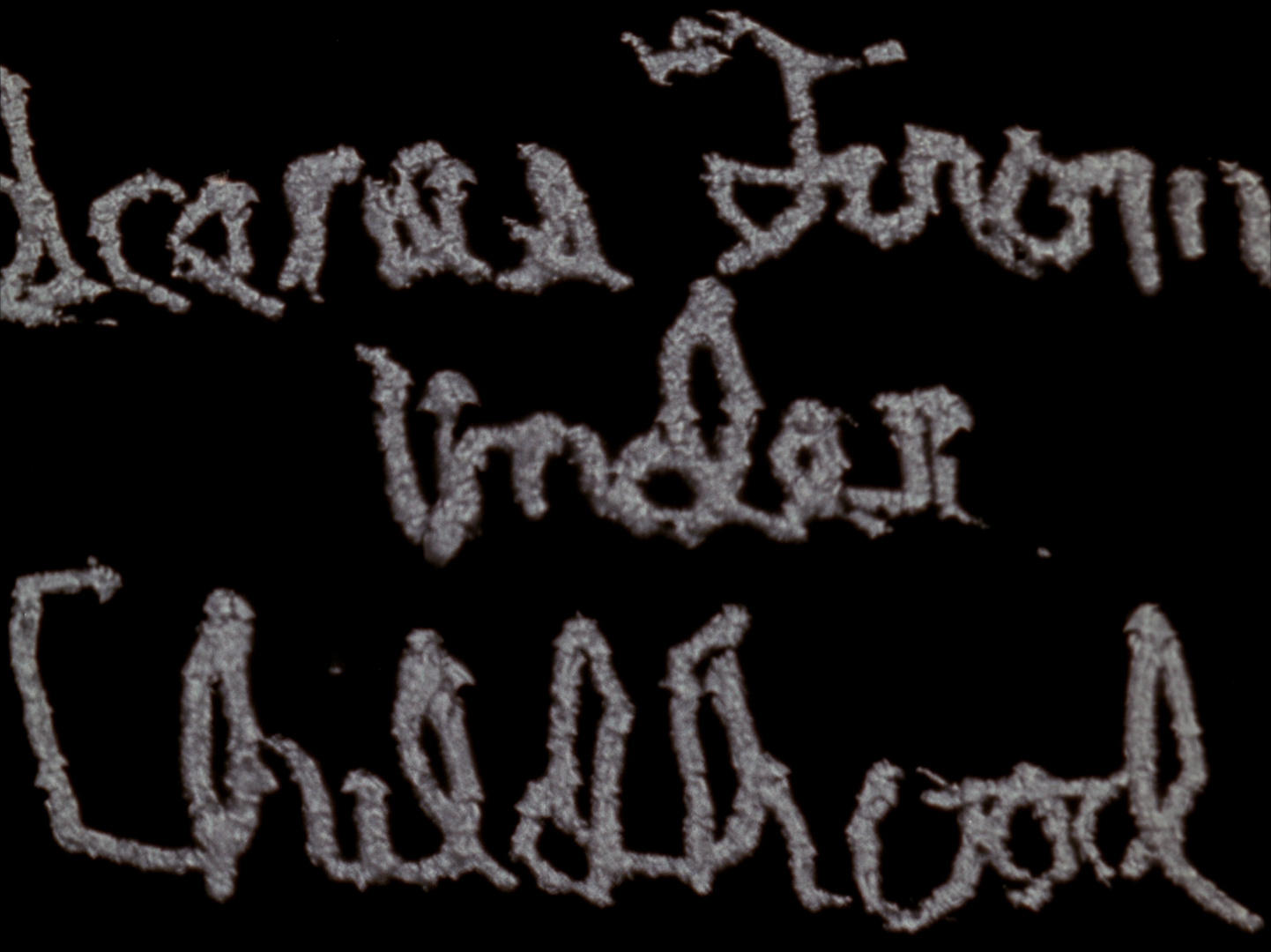
- Directed by: Stan Brakhage
- Running time: Approx. 135 min. (Total)
- Country: United States

Scenes from Under Childhood is a series of 16mm film in four independent sections by the American experimental filmmaker Stan Brakhage produced between 1967 and 1970. All four sections are silent, though Brakhage made a version with sound available for the first section.

The film is often described as an attempt by Brakhage to visualize how his children saw the world. In a 2008 Village Voice review, critic J. Hoberman wrote described the film as a "glorious, two-hour plus romantic epic." In a 1992 poll for the British film magazine Sight & Sound, experimental filmmaker Michael Snow named Scenes from Under Childhood as one of the ten greatest films of all time.

When asked to describe the film, Brakhage himself wrote that it was "a visualization of the inner world of foetal beginnings, the infant, the baby, the child – a shattering of the ‘myths of childhood’ through revelation of the extremes of violent terror and overwhelming joy of that world darkened to most adults by their sentimental remembering of it… a ‘tone poem’ for the eye – very inspired by the music of Olivier Messiaen."

== Sections ==
Year	Title	Format	Length
1967	Section One	16mm	24 1/2 minutes
1969	Section Two	16mm	40 minutes
1969	Section Three	16mm	25 minutes
1970	Section Four	16mm	45 minutes

== Archive ==
Film elements for all four sections of Scenes from Under Childhood are held by the Academy Film Archive as part of the Stan Brakhage Collection. Sections 1 and 3 were preserved by the archive in 2018.

== See also ==
- List of American films of 1967
