= The Art of Vision =

- Directed by: Stan Brakhage
- Starring: Stan Brakhage
- Cinematography: Stan Brakhage
- Edited by: Stan Brakhage
- Release date: 1965
- Running time: 270 minutes
- Country: United States
- Language: Silent film

The Art of Vision is an experimental film directed by Stan Brakhage. This colour silent films reuses footage from Brakhage's Dog Star Man but edited it into a much longer film. A presentation for retrospective screening of the film explains this difference of treatment of the same material: "The rarely screened magnum opus by Stan Brakhage, an expanded version of his "cosmological epic" Dog Star Man. That film was made with multilayered superimpositions; in The Art of Vision, each layer is shown separately."

== Reception ==
The Harvard Film Archive presents The Art of Vision as "a monumental work, regarded as one of Stan Brakhage's greatest films."
