= Anticipation of the Night =

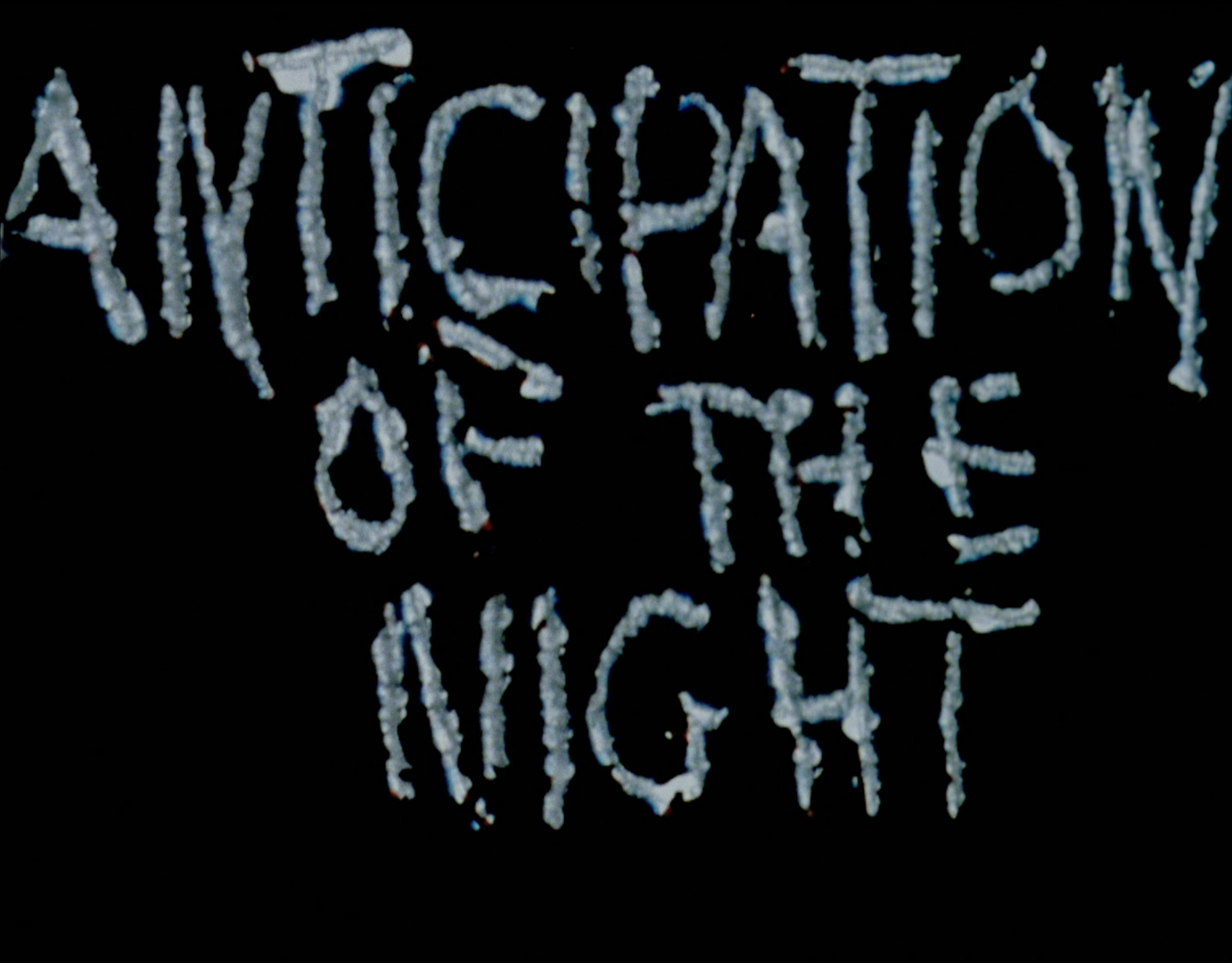
- Directed by: Stan Brakhage
- Release date: 1958
- Running time: 40 minutes
- Country: United States
- Language: Silent

Anticipation of the Night is a 1958 American avant-garde film directed by Stan Brakhage. It was a breakthrough in the development of the lyrical style Brakhage used in his later films.

== Production ==
Brakhage had been moving between New York and Los Angeles, living in poverty, before settling in Denver, Colorado in 1957. He had an idea for a feature film but needed time to plan it and a steady income with which to fund it. Brakhage began filming Anticipation of the Night that summer. He liked the intense images produced by hand-held shooting and practiced holding the camera with no film in it for an hour or two each day. Techniques Brakhage developed for the film became prominent in his directorial style. He presented objects isolated from their locations through asymmetric compositions with no visible horizon. He shot the narrative filtered through a lyrical, first-person perspective. Brakhage also incorporated intangible visual phenomena such as rainbows, halos, and reflected light.

During his time in Denver, Brakhage was engaged to be married, but the wedding was called off. He began considering suicide and intended to film his own hanging and have the footage appended to the film after his death. While editing the film at the end of 1957, Brakhage married Jane Collom, who had been a student in a class he was teaching. Although he no longer planned on committing suicide, he nearly died when he finally shot the hanging scene.

Outtakes from Anticipation of the Night appear in Brakhage's 1961 short film Thigh Line Lyre Triangular.

== Release ==
Brakhage's previous films had been distributed with the help of Cinema 16, a film society in New York. However, the organization's founder Amos Vogel refused to take Anticipation of the Night, believing the film's formlessness would be unwatchable and lead to "some kind of riot". Brakhage refused to give any of his future films to Vogel unless he agreed to take Anticipation of the Night and recent work by Marie Menken. Vogel remained steadfast, leading to Stan and Jane's decision to start distributing films out of their home in Colorado. This conflict later helped instigate the formation of the New American Cinema Group.

Anticipation of the Night was shown at the second Knokke-Le-Zoute Experimental Film Festival in 1958. It was screened the following year as part of the Brussels World Fair's Second International Film Competition. In what Kenneth Anger called "a riot", the audience quickly became agitated and protested against the film. The film was first screened in the United States in August 1961, at the Charles Theater in New York.

The film is now part of Anthology Film Archives' Essential Cinema Repertory collection. A digital transfer of Anticipation of the Night was made for its home release through Re:Voir in 2017, on Blu-ray and DVD.

== Reception ==
Annette Michelson wrote that Brakhage had reached "the threshold of his major innovations", comparing his "cinema of sight" to the emergence of Sergei Eisenstein's "cinema of intellection" in October: Ten Days That Shook the World. P. Adams Sitney remarked that the film was where Brakhage had "forged the new form for which he had been searching: the lyrical film." Ernest Callenbach denounced it, likening its form to "a Mahler symphony—the material appropriate for a delightful song has been pumped up into nearly an hour of meandering repetitions with no real sense of pace…and no precision of impact or emotion." Jonas Mekas listed Anticipation of the Night as one of the best films of 1961.
