= Interim (film) =

1953 film by Stan Brakhage

- Directed by: Stan Brakhage
- Starring: Walter Newcomb; Janice Hubka
- Cinematography: Stan Phillips
- Music by: James Tenney
- Distributed by: Canyon Cinema
- Release date: 1953
- Running time: 25 1/2 minutes
- Country: United States

Interim is a 1953 American short film drama directed by Stan Brakhage. It was the first film directed by Stan Brakhage, whose expansive filmography has made him an influential figure in experimental film.

== Plot ==
The film contains no dialogue, starring only a man and a woman, who meet as if by chance and walk into the countryside together where they stop and kiss. They then return to town before parting again.

== Production ==
The film was shot in black-and-white 16 mm film. Around the time of production, Brakhage was heavily influenced by Italian neorealism.

This was his first of many collaborations on film with composer and childhood friend James Tenney, who wrote the piano score for the film at the age of eighteen. In a foreword published by Brakhage, he cites a fault between himself and Tenney's mother for convincing Tenney to become a musician, shortly before composing the soundtrack for Interim.

== Release ==
16 mm prints of the film are distributed by Canyon Cinema both for rent and for sale to institutions. The organization is also a licensee for many of Brakhage's filmography.
