= The Way to Shadow Garden =

- Directed by: Stan Brakhage
- Release date: 1955
- Running time: 10 minutes
- Country: United States
- Language: Silent

The Way to Shadow Garden is a 1955 American experimental film directed by Stan Brakhage.

== Synopsis ==
A man returns home at night. He blinds himself and picks up the lamp, creating shadows on the walls. The image switches to a negative, and the man staggers through a doorway and collapses. He wakes up in a garden full of flowers.

== Production ==
Brakhage moved from Denver to San Francisco in late 1953, living with poet Robert Duncan and artist Jess Collins. He discovered the Art in Cinema series organized by Frank Stauffacher at the San Francisco Museum of Modern Art. He took odd jobs to finance his filmmaking practice, shooting The Boy and the Sea and The Extraordinary Child.

While living in New York, Brakhage was introduced by James Tenney to the music of Edgard Varèse. Brakhage wanted to use a recording of Varèse's Ionisation for the film's soundtrack. He went to New York to approach Varèse about using it in the film, but his request was rejected because Varèse did not own the copyright to the recording. Brakhage ended up spending some time studying under Varèse and learning about "the relationship between music and film".

== Analysis ==
Critic P. Adams Sitney characterized The Way to Shadow Garden as a trance film. It is influenced by the psychodramas of Maya Deren, such as Meshes of the Afternoon. The film deals with the subjects of sexual anxiety, masturbation, loneliness, and suicide. Fred Camper, in examining the film's use of negative images, identified the film as marking the beginning of Brakhage's shift away from "conventional photographic representation".

== Release ==
The Way to Shadow Garden screened at the second Knokke-Le-Zoute Experimental Film Festival in 1958. It was released on DVD as part of Kino International's Avant-Garde 2: Experimental Cinema 1928–1954 box set, along with Brakhage's early films Interim, Unglassed Windows Cast a Terrible Reflection, and The Extraordinary Child.
