= Our Lady of the Sphere =

- Directed by: Larry Jordan
- Distributed by: Canyon Cinema
- Release date: 1969
- Running time: 10 minutes
- Country: United States

Our Lady of the Sphere is a 1969 American experimental film directed by Larry Jordan.

== Summary ==
The experimental film features ambiguous characters (a boy, a deep-sea diver and a mystical lady with an orbital head) on a surrealist dream-like journey full of various imagery through juxtaposed with symbols and images from themes such as antiquity to the space age, accompanied by alternating backgrounds, before the film ends in a garden.

== Legacy ==
Our Lady of the Sphere is now part of Anthology Film Archives' Essential Cinema Repertory collection. In 2010, it was selected for preservation in the National Film Registry by the Library of Congress.

== See also ==
- List of American films of 1969
- 1969 in film
- Cutout animation
