= The Wold Shadow =

- An image from The Wold Shadow
- Directed by: Stan Brakhage
- Release date: 1972
- Running time: 2 ½ minutes
- Country: United States
- Language: English

The Wold Shadow is an experimental short film by Stan Brakhage, produced in 1972.

== Production ==
The Wold Shadow was inspired when Stan Brakhage, while walking through a forest, had a vision of an anthropomorphic shadow. The experience led him to film a homage to the "god of the forest." The Wold Shadow was produced by placing glass on an easel between his camera and the forest. Between each individual frame, Brakhage painted on the glass, before repeating this process. Production of The Wold Shadow took a full day. Brakhage credits the film with reigniting his interest in painting, and described his choice of title as follows:

"Wold" because the word refers to "forests" which poets later made "plains" and because the work also contains the rustic sense "to kill" - this then my laboriously painted vision of the god of the forest.

== Reception ==
Martin Rumsby, writing in Senses of Cinema, cites The Wold Shadow as a rare instance of Brakhage attempting a work of structural cinema. He nevertheless acknowledges that the film is more "romantic" than most structural films, in that Brakhage is "trying to capture or evoke something mysterious and unknowable." P. Adams Sitney considers The Wold Shadow a continuation of themes expressed in the poetry of Ezra Pound.

== See also ==
- List of American films of 1972
