= Santiago Álvarez (filmmaker) =

Cuban filmmaker (1919–1998)

Santiago Álvarez Román (March 8, 1919 – May 20, 1998) was a Cuban filmmaker. He wrote and directed many documentaries about Cuban and American culture. His "nervous montage" technique of using "found materials," such as Hollywood movie clips, cartoons, and photographs, is considered a precursor to the modern video clip.

== Biography ==
He studied in the United States but in the mid-1940s returned to Cuba, where he worked as a music archivist in a television station and participated in Communist Party activities. After the Cuban Revolution he became a founding member of the Cuban Film Institute (ICAIC) and directed its weekly Latin American Newsreel.

One of his most famous works, the short Now (1964) about racial discrimination in the US, mixed news photographs and musical clips featuring singer/actress Lena Horne. Other well-known works included the anti-imperialist satire LBJ (1968) and 79 Springs (1969), a poetic tribute to Ho Chi Minh.

In 1968, he collaborated with Octavio Getino and Fernando E. Solanas (members of Grupo Cine Liberación) on the four-hour documentary The Hour of the Furnaces, about foreign imperialism in South America.

Among the other subjects he explored in his films were the musical and cultural scene in Latin America and the dictatorships which gripped the region.

The second chapter of French director Jean-Luc Godard's Histoire(s) du cinéma is dedicated to Álvarez, amongst others.

He died of Parkinson's disease in Havana on May 20, 1998, and was buried there in the Colon Cemetery.

== Filmography ==
- Ciclon (Hurricane) (1963)
- Segunda Declaracion de la Habana (1964)
- Now (1965)
- La Guerra Olvidada (Laos: A Forgotten War) (1966)
- Cerro Pelado (1966)
- Hanoi, Martes 13 (1967)
- 79 Primaveras (1969)
- El Sueno del Pongo (The Servant's Dream) (1970)
- De America soy hijo y a ella de debo (Born of the Americas) (1972)
- Y el cielo fue tomado por asulto (And heaven was taken by storm) (1973)
- El tigre saltó y mató, pero morirá... morirá... (The Tiger leaps and kills, but it will die...) (1973)
- Abril de Vietnam an el ano del gato (1975)
- Mi Hermano Fidel (1977)

== See also ==
- Cinema of Cuba
