= Songs (Stan Brakhage cycle) =

1962 series of American artistic films

- Directed by: Stan Brakhage
- Cinematography: Stan Brakhage
- Running time: Approx. 289 min. (Total)
- Country: United States

The Songs are a cycle of silent color 8mm films by the American experimental filmmaker Stan Brakhage produced from 1964 to 1969. They are seen as one of Brakhage's major works and include the feature-length 23rd Psalm Branch, considered by some to be one of the filmmaker's masterworks and described by film historian P. Adams Sitney as "an apocalypse of imagination." One of the filmmaker's most overtly political films, 23rd Psalm Branch is often interpreted as being Brakhage's reaction to the Vietnam War.

== Production of the Cycle ==
During a 1964 visit to New York City, Brakhage's 16mm film equipment was stolen. Unable to afford the cost of replacing the equipment, Brakhage instead opted to buy cheaper 8mm film equipment, which at the time was being marketed to amateurs to use for home movies. The Songs were Brakhage's first works in the medium. Altogether, there are 31 parts to the cycle, all but one of which is numbered in some way. Brakhage would occasionally combine two parts to make one film, making for a total of 25 films, including both parts of Song 27, which were released separately. Though most of the Songs are only a few minutes, some are as long as half an hour and the 23rd part, titled 23rd Psalm Branch, runs 69 minutes. Projected as a series, the cycle runs about 289 minutes.

Starting in 1979, Brakhage released reprinted and revised versions of some of the Songs films, including a 16mm version of 23rd Psalm Branch in two parts. This version runs a total of 78 minutes. In 1987, Brakhage released a 20-minute version of My Mtn. Song 27, the first half of the cycle's 27th part.

== The Films ==
Year	Title	Format	Length
1964	Song 1	8mm	3 minutes
1964	Song 2 & Song 3	8mm	4 1/2 minutes
1964	Song 4	8mm	3 minutes
1964	Song 5	8mm	3 1/2 minutes
1964	Song 6 & Song 7	8mm	4 1/2 minutes
1964	Song 8	8mm	3 1/2 minutes
1965	Song 9 & Song 10	8mm	7 minutes
1965	Song 11	8mm	3 minutes
1965	Song 12	8mm	3 minutes
1965	Song 13	8mm	3 minutes
1965	Song 14	8mm	3 minutes
1965	15 Song Traits	8mm	38 1/2 minutes
1965	Song 16	8mm	7 minutes
1965	Songs 17 & 18	8mm	5 minutes
1965	Songs 19 & 20	8mm	8 minutes
1965	Songs 21 & 22	8mm	6 minutes
1966 / 1967	23rd Psalm Branch	8mm	69 minutes
1968	Songs 24 & 25	8mm	6 1/2 minutes
1968	Song 26	8mm	8 minutes
1968	My Mtn. Song 27	8mm	17 1/2 minutes
1969	Song 27 (Part II) Rivers	8mm	24 minutes
1969	Song 28	8mm	3 minutes
1969	Song 29	8mm	3 minutes
1969	American 30's Song	8mm	35 minutes
1969	Window Suite of Children’s Songs	8mm	24 minutes
