= Larry Jordan (filmmaker) =

American filmmaker

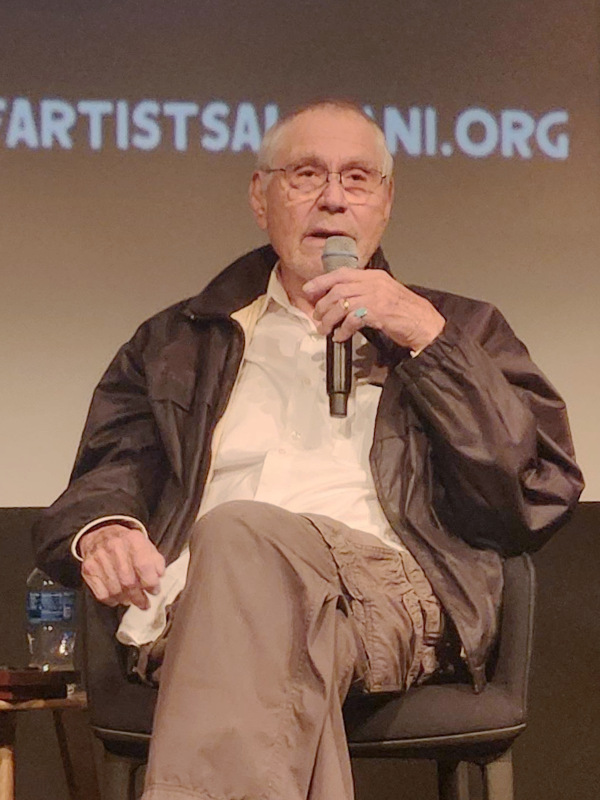
Larry Jordan in 2025

Lawrence Jordan (born 1934) is an American independent filmmaker who is most widely known for his animated collage films. He was a founding member of the Canyon Cinema Cooperative and the Camera Obscura Film Society, and was also a music video director.

== Biography ==
Jordan was born in 1934 in Denver, Colorado. He attended South High School with Stan Brakhage. He attended Harvard University from 1951 to 1953, where he was active in the film society.

Jordan moved to Central City, where he put on plays with friends from high school. Both he and Brakhage began making films during this period, with Jordan appearing in Brakhage's Unglassed Windows Cast a Terrible Reflection and Desistfilm and Brakhage appearing in Jordan's The One Romantic Venture of Edward and Trumpit. While the two were in New York, Jordan met artist Joseph Cornell at his show at the Stable Gallery. He described Cornell's work as "like an anchor" for him, aligning with his own "sensibility of delicate magic".

In 1955, Jordan settled in the San Francisco Bay Area. He appeared as Faust in Robert Duncan's play Faust Foutu, and Jess introduced him to collage novels by Max Ernst, which became a major influence on his filmmaking. He taught Bruce Conner how to edit films, and in 1957 the two founded the Camera Obscura Film Society, which was active until 1962. Jordan made several voyages as a Merchant Marine during this period.

During the 1960s, Jordan was one of the founding members of the Canyon Cinema Cooperative. He was inspired by The Tibetan Book of the Dead when creating his 1969 film Our Lady of the Sphere, now one of his best-known works. In 1970 he received a Guggenheim Fellowship to make Sacred Art of Tibet.

In 2008 Facets Multi-Media released the Lawrence Jordan Album, a DVD collection with 25 of his films. The Camera Obscura Film Society was re-established in 2015, and Jordan's films are screened as part of its annual report in Petaluma, California.

== Legacy ==
Our Lady of the Sphere was inducted into the National Film Registry in 2010.

== Filmography ==
- Man Is in Pain (1954)
- Undertow (1955)
- The One Romantic Adventure of Edward (1956)
- Three (1956)
- Trumpit (1956) with Stan Brakhage
- Waterlight (1957)
- Spectre Mystagogic (1957)
- Triptych in Four Parts (1958)
- Minerva Looks Out into the Zodiac (1959)
- Hymn in Praise of the Sun (1960)
- The Season's Change (1960)
- The Soccer Game (1960)
- The 40 and 1 Nights (or Jess's Didactic Nickelodeon) (1961)
- Pink Swine (1963)
- Portrait of Sharon (1963)
- Rodia-Estudiantina (1963)
- Duo Concertantes (1964)
- Ein Traum Der Liebenden (1964)
- Jewel Face (1964)
- Johnnie (1964)
- The Dream Merchant (1965)
- Gymnopédies (1965)
- Hamfat Asar (1965)
- Big Sur: The Ladies (1966)
- The Old House Passing (1967)
- Hildur and the Magician (1969)
- Our Lady of the Sphere (1969)
- Sacred Art of Tibet (1972)
- Orb (1973)
- Once Upon a Time (1974)
- The Apparition (1976)
- Cut-Out Animation: Larry Jordan (1977)
- The Rime of the Ancient Mariner (1977)
- Ancestors (1978)
- Cornell, 1965 (1978)
- Visions of a City (1978)
- Moonlight Sonata (1979)
- Finds of the Fortenight (1980)
- Carabosse (1980)
- Adagio (1981)
- Masquerade (1981)
- In a Summer Garden (Part 2) (1983)
- The Grove (1983)
- Winter Light (1983)
- Sophie's Place (1986)
- The Visible Compendium (1991)
- The Black Oud (1992)
- Star of Day (1994)
- Postcard from San Miguel (1996)
- Chateau/Poyet (2004)
- Enid's Idyll (2004)
- Poet's Dream (2005)
- Blue Skies Beyond the Looking Glass (2006)
- Silent Sonatas (2007)
- The Miracle of the Don Cristobal (2008)
- Circus Savage (2009)
- Beyond Enchantment (2010)
- Cosmic Alchemy (2010)
- Moments of Illumination (2010)
- Solar Sight (2011)
- Solar Sight II (2012)
- Solar Sight III (2013)
- After the Circus (2013)
- Entr'acte (2013)
- Driving Demons (2014)
- Inferno (2014)
- The Apoplectic Walrus (2015)
- Entr'acte II (2015)
- Night Light (2016)
- Entr'acte III (2017)
- Time Travel (2017)
- Delirium (2018)
- Oz (2019)
- The Ogre's Garden (2019)
- Alchemy (2021)
- Belle du Jour (2021)
- Harper's Bazar (2022)
- Reve d'Or (2023)
- Fairytale (2023)
- The Egg (2024)
- Hommage (2024)
- Dreamscape I (2025)
