= The Dante Quartet =

1987 film by Stan Brakhage

- A hand-painted image from The Dante Quartet
- Directed by: Stan Brakhage
- Release date: 1987
- Running time: 6 minutes
- Country: United States
- Language: Silent

The Dante Quartet is an experimental short film by Stan Brakhage, completed in 1987. The film was inspired by Dante's Divine Comedy, and took six years to produce.

== Production ==
The Dante Quartet was inspired by Brakhage's interest in Dante's Divine Comedy, which he had first encountered in high school at the suggestion of his English professor. In the years since, Brakhage had read almost every English translation of the poem that he could find.

Then comes a moment when suddenly I can't handle the language anymore, like I can't read one more translation of The Divine Comedy, and suddenly I realize it's in my eyes all the time, that I have a vision of Hell, I have even more necessary kind of a way of getting out of Hell, kind of a springboard in my thinking, closing my eyes and thinking what I'm seeing [...] and also purgation, that I can go through the stages of purging the self, of trying to become pure, free of these ghastly visions, and then there is something that's as close to Heaven as I would hope to aspire to, which I call "existence is song." And that all of that was in my eyes all the time, backfiring all these years [...] It's lovely that I can have the language, but I also have a visual corollary of it, but that is a story.

The Dante Quartet took six years to produce. The eight-minute silent film was created by painting images directly onto the film, though he often worked with previously photographed material that was then scraped away or otherwise manipulated. The paint was applied very thickly onto the film, up to half an inch thick. The Dante Quartet was originally painted on IMAX and Cinemascope 70mm and 35mm film; however, it has since been rephotographed onto 35mm and 16mm formats, in which it is now most commonly screened.

The Dante Quartet is divided into four parts, titled Hell Itself, Hell Spit Flexion, Purgation and existence is song, respectively. Brakhage described the sections as follows:

I made Hell Itself during the breakup with Jane [Brakhage] and the collapse of my whole life, so I got to know quite well the streaming of the hypnagogic that's hellish. Now the body can not only feed back its sense of being in hell but also its getting out of hell, and Hell Spit Flexion shows the way out – it's there as crowbar to lift one out of hell toward the transformatory state – purgatory. And finally there's a fourth state that's fleeting. I've called the last part existence is song quoting Rilke, (Note: The title existence is song is specifically taken from Rainer Maria Rilke's Sonnets to Orpheus I,3, though the phrase appears only in the reversed form, "song is existence" (Gesang ist Dasein).) because I don't want to presume upon the after-life and call it “Heaven.”

== Reception ==
Bart Testa praised the "radical daring" of Brakhage's filmmaking, and wrote that The Dante Quartet "condenses into eight visionary minutes what unfolded as great epic. This is the myth of Brakhage's aesthetic brought to bear." Adrian Danks, writing for Senses of Cinema, described the film as offering "an obscure, off-centre and idiosyncratic perspective that is difficult to conceive – at least initially – as anything other than a glorious celebration of the experiential and material possibilities of film stock and projected light."

In 2023, IndieWire ranked the film one of the 100 best films of the 1980s, with critic Samantha Bergeson writing, "That its production required a longer dedication of time and effort from Brakhage than shooting Apocalypse Now in croc-infested waters required from Francis Ford Coppola or dragging a boat over a mountain for Fitzcarraldo did from Werner Herzog only adds to the sense of beholding an artist's magnum opus."
