= Thanatopsis (film) =

- Directed by: Ed Emshwiller
- Release date: 1962
- Running time: 5 minutes
- Country: United States

Thanatopsis is an experimental short film by Ed Emshwiller, produced in 1962.

== Description ==
Thanatopsis features images of a motionless man (Mac Emshwiller) and an indistinct dancing woman (Becky Arnold). The film's soundtrack includes a heartbeat and a hacksaw. The title is from the Greek thanatos ("death") and -opsis ("sight"), the word often translated to mean "meditation on death". Thanatopsis is one of several Emshwiller films to feature dance passages, with others including Lifelines, Dance Chromatic, Fusion, Totem, Chrysalis, and Film With Three Dancers.

== Reception ==
Peter Lev described Thanatopsis as the most fascinating and technically accomplished of Emshwiller's early dance films, and a "disturbing contemplation on death." Jenelle Porter thought the film "visually unadorned yet supercharged by vibrating visual effects and [its] soundtrack."

== See also ==
- List of American films of 1962
