= Blue Moses (film) =

- Directed by: Stan Brakhage
- Starring: Robert Benson
- Release date: 1962
- Running time: 11 minutes
- Country: United States
- Language: English

Blue Moses is a 1962 American experimental film directed by Stan Brakhage, starring Robert Benson.

== Synopsis ==
The film begins with its opening credits, a series dissolves showing the credits written on rocks in a wooded area. A man dressed as a carnival barker emerges from the cave, shown through multiple jump cuts. In the woods, he tells a story about a set of footprints he is investigating. The man reappears in a robe and announces an eclipse, produced with a section of black film leader. He switches to using a Southern accent and explains that the film is about the viewers and notes that there is a filmmaker behind all of the events shown. He is then shown with the previous images projected onto his exposed back. The film returns to him as a carnival barker outside a cave and ends with a series of dissolves.

== Production ==
Blue Moses originated from discussions between Brakhage and Benson on the role of sound, plot, and the cameraman in film. Its use of sound was atypical for Brakhage, who argued that sound interferes with the image, and it was his only film to use sync sound. He stated that he drew on an experience hiking in the mountains with his wife Jane for the film's story about running footprints.

== Analysis ==
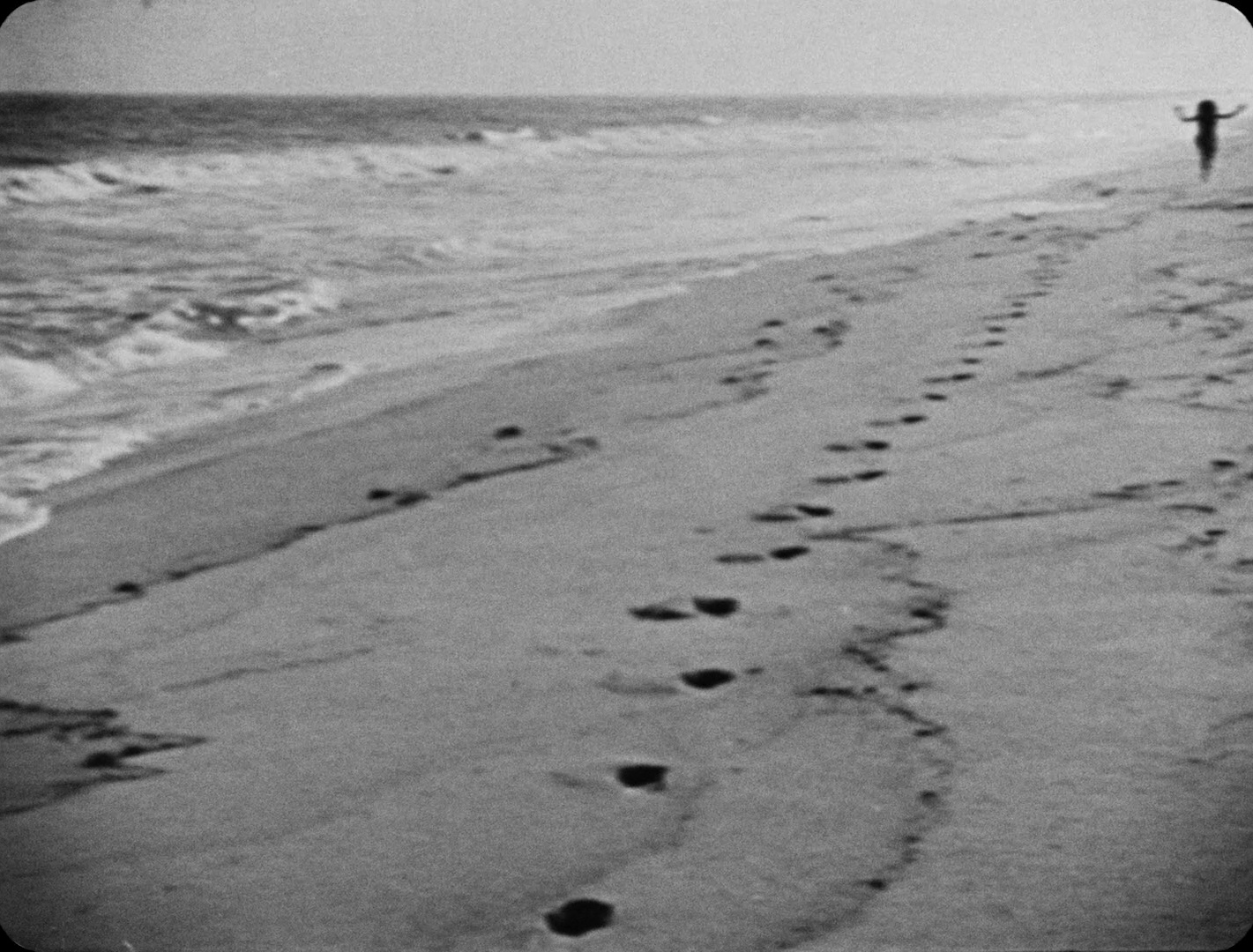
P. Adams Sitney linked the tracks in Blue Moses to the footprints on the beach in Maya Deren's At Land.

Brakhage often draws upon traditional stories in his films. In Blue Moses, he alludes to the story of God showing his back to Moses in the Book of Exodus. He makes use of Plato's allegory of the cave as a metaphor.

Film theorist P. Adams Sitney established Blue Moses as a reaction to the work of Maya Deren. Brakhage's first films had been strongly influenced by Deren's psychodramas, which made use of montage and shot/countershot structures to build "a uniquely cinematic time and space." However, he soon began moving toward films about the act of seeing, a shift Deren had criticized in her essay "Cinematography: The Creative Use of Reality", published in 1960 shortly before her death. Blue Moses makes reference to Deren's 1944 film At Land in its circular structure, the sudden costume changes of its protagonist, and its story about footprints.

== Release ==
Brakhage screened Blue Moses at the third Knokke-Le-Zoute Experimental Film Festival, where it was well received. It is part of Anthology Film Archives' Essential Cinema Repertory collection.

== Sources ==
- Monaco, Paul (2003). The Sixties. University of California Press.
- Sitney, P. Adams (1990). Modernist Montage: The Obscurity of Vision in Cinema and Literature. Columbia University Press.
- Sitney, P. Adams (2002). Visionary Film: The American Avant-Garde, 1943–2000. Oxford University Press. ISBN 978-0195148862.
- Sitney, P. Adams (2011). "Brakhage's Faustian Psychodrama". In James, David (ed.). Stan Brakhage: Filmmaker. Temple University Press.
