= Stan Brakhage =

American filmmaker and writer (1933–2003)

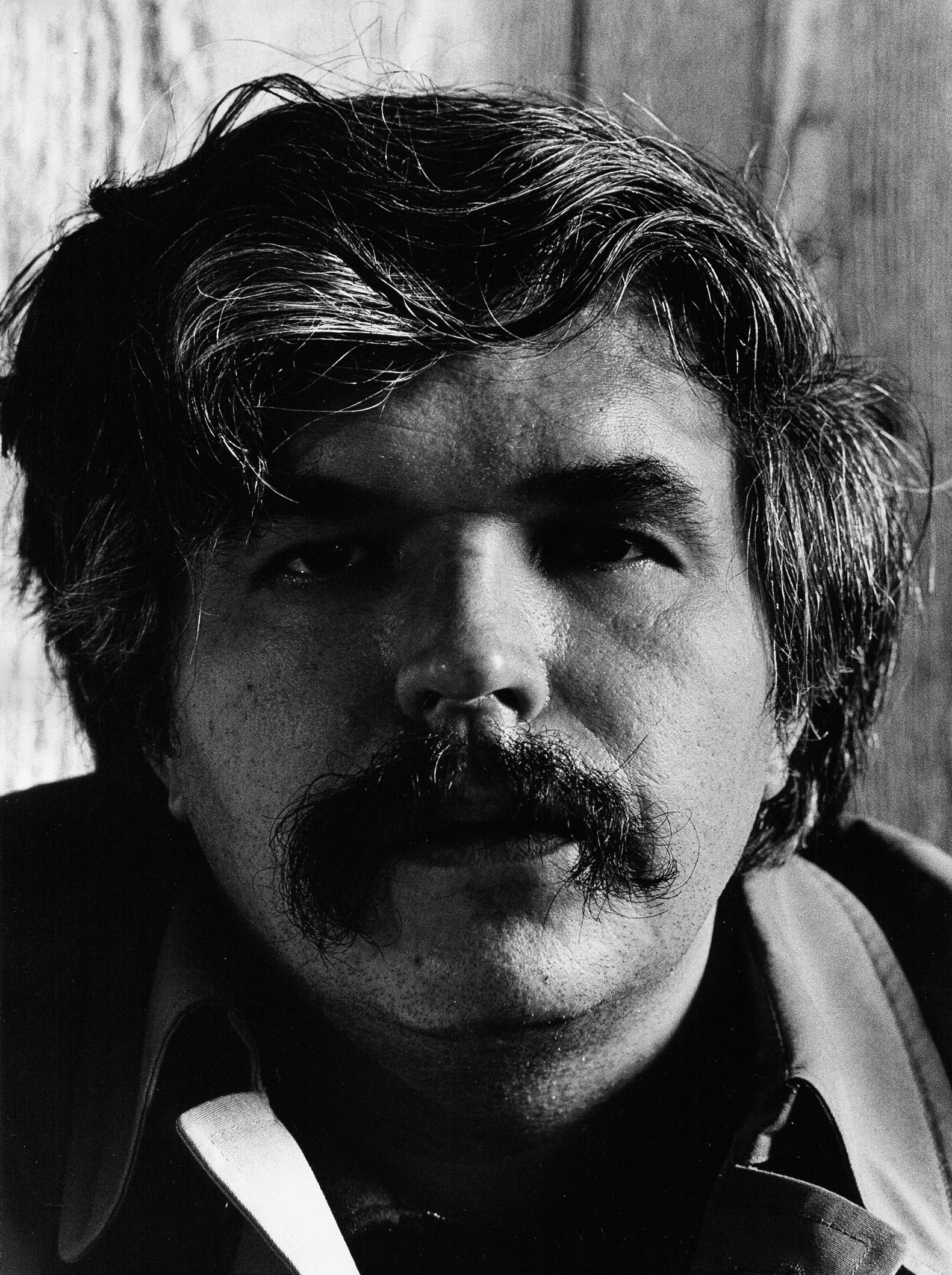
- Photo of Brakhage by Friedl Kubelka, c. 1976
- Born: Robert Sanders; January 14, 1933; Kansas City, Missouri, U.S.
- Died: March 9, 2003 (aged 70); Victoria, British Columbia, Canada
- Occupation: Film director
- Years active: 1954–2003
- Notable work: Dog Star Man, Mothlight, Window Water Baby Moving
- Movement: Avant-garde cinema

James Stanley Brakhage (/ˈbrækɪdʒ/ BRAK-ij; January 14, 1933 – March 9, 2003) was an American experimental filmmaker. He is considered to be one of the most important figures in 20th-century experimental film.

Over the course of five decades, Brakhage created a large and diverse body of work, exploring a variety of formats, approaches and techniques that included handheld camerawork, painting directly onto celluloid, fast cutting, in-camera editing, scratching on film, collage film and the use of multiple exposures. Interested in mythology and inspired by music, poetry and visual phenomena, Brakhage sought to reveal the universal, in particular exploring themes of birth, mortality, sexuality, and innocence. His films are for the most part silent.

Brakhage's films are often noted for their expressiveness and lyricism. While they were for many years obscure and hard to find, many are now archived and readily available on modern home media.

== Biography ==
Born Robert Sanders in Kansas City, Missouri on January 14, 1933, Brakhage was adopted and renamed three weeks after his birth by Ludwig and Clara Brakhage.

As a child Brakhage was featured on radio as a boy soprano, and sang in church choirs and as a soloist at other events. He was raised in Denver, Colorado, where he attended South High School with the filmmakers Larry Jordan and Stan Phillips, and the composers James Tenney and Ramiro Cortes. At South he and other friends (Larry Hackstaff, Walt Newcomb, Gordon Rosenblum, Tom O'Brien, Stan Phillips and others) formed a social and intellectual group, calling themselves "the Gadflies", after Socrates.

Brakhage briefly attended Dartmouth College on a scholarship before dropping out to make films. He completed his first film, Interim, at the age of 19; the music for the film was composed by his school friend James Tenney. In 1953, Brakhage moved to San Francisco to attend the San Francisco Art Institute, then called the California School of Fine Arts. He found the atmosphere in San Francisco more rewarding, associating with poets Robert Duncan and Kenneth Rexroth, but did not complete his education, instead moving to New York City in 1954. There, he met a number of notable artists, including Maya Deren (in whose apartment he briefly lived), Willard Maas, Jonas Mekas, Marie Menken, Joseph Cornell and John Cage. Brakhage would collaborate with the latter two, making two films with Cornell (Gnir Rednow and Centuries of June) and using Cage's music for the soundtrack of his first color film, In Between. Brakhage is on record as having said: "If there is one single filmmaker that I owe the most to for the crucial development of my own film making it would be Marie Menken."

Brakhage spent the next few years living in near poverty, depressed about what he saw as the failure of his work. He briefly considered suicide. While living in Denver, Brakhage met Mary Jane Collom (see Jane Wodening), whom he married in late 1957. Brakhage tried to make money on his films, but had to take a job making industrial shorts to support his family. In 1958, Jane gave birth to the first of the five children they would have together, a daughter called Myrrena, an event Brakhage recorded for his 1959 film Window Water Baby Moving.

In 1959 Brakhage also released the film Cat's Cradle. His friend Carolee Schneemann, who also appeared in several other Brakhage films, appeared in this one, in which she wore an apron at Brakhage's insistence. Despite her friendship with Brakhage, she later described the experience as "frightening," remarking that "whenever I collaborated, went into a male friend's film, I always thought I would be able to hold my presence, maintain an authenticity. It was soon gone, lost in their celluloid dominance--a terrifying experience--experiences of true dissolution."

=== The 1960s and beginning of recognition ===
When Brakhage's early films had been exhibited in the 1950s, they had often been met with derision, but in the early 1960s Brakhage began to receive recognition in exhibitions and film publications, including Film Culture, which gave awards to several of his films, including The Dead, in 1962. The award statement, written by Jonas Mekas, a critic who would later become an influential experimental filmmaker in his own right, cited Brakhage for bringing to cinema "an intelligence and subtlety that is usually the province of the older arts." Writer/critic Guy Davenport, an ardent admirer of Brakhage, invited him to the University of Kentucky in March 1964 and tried to get him a residency there.

From 1961 to 1964, Brakhage worked on a series of five films known as the Dog Star Man cycle. The Brakhages moved to Lump Gulch, Colorado, in 1964, though Brakhage continued to make regular visits to New York. During one of those visits, the 16mm film equipment he had been using was stolen. Brakhage couldn't afford to replace it, instead opting to buy cheaper 8mm film equipment. He soon began working in the format, producing a 30-part cycle of 8mm films known as the Songs from 1964 to 1969. The Songs include one of Brakhage's most acclaimed films, 23rd Psalm Branch, a response to the Vietnam War and its presentation in the mass media.

=== 1970s and 1980s ===
A hand-painted image from The Dante Quartet (1987)

Brakhage explored new approaches to filmmaking in the 1970s. In 1971, he completed a set of three films inspired by public institutions in the city of Pittsburgh. These three films—Eyes, about the city police, Deus Ex, filmed in a hospital, and The Act of Seeing with One's Own Eyes, depicting autopsy—are collectively known as "The Pittsburgh Trilogy". In 1974, Brakhage made the feature-length The Text of Light, consisting entirely of images of light refracted in a glass ashtray. In 1979, he experimented with Polavision, a format marketed by Polaroid, making about five 2 1/2 minute films. The whereabouts of these films are unknown as of 2024. He continued his visual explorations of landscape and the nature of light and thought process, and through the late 1970s and early 1980s produced filmic equivalents of what he termed "moving visual thinking" in several series of photographic abstractions known as the Roman, Arabic, and Egyptian series.

Stan Brakhage taught at the University of Colorado in Boulder off and on, in the late 1970s through the late 1980s. He separated from Jane in 1986, and in 1989 married his second wife, Marilyn; the two went on to have two children together. In the late 1980s, Brakhage returned to making sound films, with the four-part Faustfilm cycle, and also completed the hand-painted film, The Dante Quartet.

Brakhage was awarded the Edward MacDowell Medal in 1989.

=== 1990s and 2000s ===
Brakhage remained extremely productive through the last two decades of his life, sometimes working in collaboration with other filmmakers, including his University of Colorado colleague Phil Solomon. Several more sound films were completed, including Passage Through: A Ritual, edited to the music of Philip Corner, Christ Mass Sex Dance and Ellipses Reel 5, both with music by James Tenney. He also produced the major meditations on childhood, adolescence, aging and mortality collectively known as the "Vancouver Island Quartet," as well as numerous hand-painted works.

Brakhage was diagnosed with bladder cancer in 1996, and his bladder was removed. The surgery seemed successful, but the cancer eventually returned. In a video interview in 2002, he explained that his cancer was caused by the toxicity of the aniline dyes he had used to paint directly onto film.

Brakhage retired from teaching and moved to Canada in 2002, settling with his second wife Marilyn and their two sons in Victoria, British Columbia. Brakhage died there on March 9, 2003, aged 70. The last footage Brakhage shot has been made available under the title Work in Progress. At the time of his death, Brakhage was also working on the Chinese Series, a work that was achieved by scratching directly on to film, a technique that was employed by the French artist Isidore Isou in 1950.

Though not a practicing Christian during his adulthood, Brakhage requested a traditional Anglican service. The funeral was attended largely by family members, as well as a few friends from the filmmaking world, and included a performance of Johann Sebastian Bach's Toccata and Fugue in D Minor.

== Influence ==
In 1961, Jonas Mekas wrote that Brakhage is "one of the four or five most authentic film artists working in cinema anywhere, and perhaps the most original filmmaker in America today". Among Brakhage's students were Eric Darnell, the director of Antz, as well as the creators of South Park, Matt Stone and Trey Parker, and he is featured in their student film Cannibal! The Musical.

Martin Scorsese's The Last Temptation of Christ uses Brakhage's painted film style to depict the death of Jesus on the cross. Scorsese has framed samples of Brakhage's films on his office wall. George Lucas has credited Brakhage as an influence. Don Hertzfeldt cited Brakhage as an influence, saying his work "encouraged lots of my own in-camera-special-effect attempts". Kyle Edward Ball, the director of Skinamarink, cited experimental filmmakers such as Brakhage as an influence on his work. The opening titles to the BBC television series The Living and the Dead (2016) use an excerpt from Mothlight.

The opening track of Stereolab's album Dots and Loops (1997), "Brakhage", is named after him. Sonic Youth, joined by percussionist Tim Barnes, played along with silent Stan Brakhage films at a 2003 benefit show for Anthology Film Archives. The live recording is available as SYR6: Koncertas Stan Brakhage Prisiminimui.

The credits of the film Seven (1995), the 1997 anime film The End of Evangelion, the concluding credits to The Jacket (2005), the 2011 film The Tree of Life and Part 8 of Twin Peaks: The Return (2017) include sequences that writers have characterized as reminiscent of Brakhage's work, although any direct influence has not been confirmed.

== Writings ==
Brakhage wrote a number of books about films, including Metaphors on Vision (1963), A Moving Picture Giving and Taking Book (1971), Film Biographies (1977, Turtle Island Books) and the posthumously published Telling Time: Essays of a Visionary Filmmaker (2003). Transcripts of his talks at the Chicago Art Institute were edited and published as Film at Wit's End: Eight Avant-Garde Filmmakers, (Kingston, New York, McPherson & Co., 1989).

== Archives ==
Brakhage's archival material, including correspondence, manuscripts, and audio recordings, are held by the University of Colorado as part of the collection of the Brakhage Center. Brakhage's films, including original elements and prints, are held by the Academy Film Archive in the Stan Brakhage Collection. The Academy Film Archive has preserved and restored many Brakhage films and continues to do so. Films preserved include Window Water Baby Moving, The Act of Seeing with One's Own Eyes, Anticipation of the Night and Interim.
