= Lucifer Rising (Bobby Beausoleil soundtrack) =

Soundtrack album by Bobby Beausoleil and The Freedom Orchestra
- Released: 1980
- Recorded: 1976–79
- Genres: Psychedelic; progressive rock; hard rock; film score
- Length: 42:55
- Label: Lethal Records

Lucifer Rising is an album composed and recorded by Bobby Beausoleil and the Freedom Orchestra, a band consisting of inmates from Deuel Vocational Institution also known as Tracy Prison. The album is the soundtrack to the 1972 film Lucifer Rising, directed by avant-garde mystic Kenneth Anger. The soundtrack album was initially released on vinyl LP in 1980, and has since been reissued multiple times in CD and LP formats.

== Creation ==
The Lucifer Rising film project had its genesis in 1966 when Kenneth Anger conceived of making a film that would be antithetical to his previous film, Scorpio Rising, a dark film exploring death image fixations in the outlaw motorcycle culture. In contrast, the filmmaker wanted his new film to be a celebration of a rebellious "bringer of light" themed imagery.

In early 1967, Anger attended The Invisible Circus, an erotic-themed counterculture event held at Glide Memorial Church, where Bobby Beausoleil was performing with his band, The Orkustra. Impressed by Beausoleil's performance, Anger approached him about playing the starring role in his new film. After some discussion, Beausoleil agreed on the condition that he would create the soundtrack for the project. They worked on the film project together through the summer of that year but the collaboration fell apart in the fall, coinciding with the rapid disintegration of the counterculture scene in San Francisco.

In 1972, Kenneth Anger approached Jimmy Page of the rock band Led Zeppelin with a proposal to compose the soundtrack for his resurrected film project, Lucifer Rising. Anger announced in a 1972 interview with Variety magazine, that Page would be composing the soundtrack and also stated that the film was near completion. He also (erroneously) claimed that Page was involved in the creation of the film itself.

Composition for the album was halted when Anger, following a dispute with Page's wife Charlotte, was thrown out of the basement of Page's London mansion. Page had previously allowed Anger to reside in the basement for at least the duration of the film's production, although the particulars of the arrangement are unclear. Nevertheless, following his eviction, Anger began to criticize Page and his wife in the press. Anger said, "I'm beginning to think Jimmy has dried up as a musician. He has got no themes, no inspiration, no melodies to offer."

After learning of Page's exit from the production of the soundtrack, state prisoner Bobby Beausoleil wrote to Anger from Tracy Prison (also known as Deuel Vocational Institution) in San Joaquin County, California. Beausoleil suggested that he should compose the soundtrack for Lucifer Rising, as the two had originally agreed a decade earlier. He told Anger that he believed he could obtain approval from the prison administration to record his compositions within the institution. Anger provided a modest $3,000 for the purchase of recording equipment.

Beausoleil enlisted the sponsorship of Minerva Bertholf, a teacher at the prison, to facilitate the purchase of recording equipment. Permission to proceed with the project was granted by the Warden. Beausoleil formed the Freedom Orchestra with fellow inmates, and recorded the album in the prison using instruments built in the prison handicraft shop. Anger was enthusiastic about the project, and he would occasionally visit Tracy Prison to discuss the project with Beausoleil.

Following the debut of the film with its soundtrack in 1980, the 44-minute soundtrack to Lucifer Rising was released on vinyl LP by Lethal Records. Most of the initial copies were sold by Anger at the screenings of his film. Beausoleil reissued the soundtrack in 2005, with additional outtakes from the 1967 iteration of the Lucifer Rising soundtrack in a two-CD package on the Arcanum label. The four-LP anthology The Lucifer Rising Suite followed in 2009, comprising all the project recordings, released on The Ajna Offensive label, with a CD release in 2014. In another collaboration with Ajna Offensive, Bobby Beausoleil released a 2017 commemorative reissue of the original soundtrack as a continuous mix on vinyl LP and limited edition CD.

== Theme ==
The music of Lucifer Rising is closely linked with the occult elements found in Anger's film of the same name. Beausoleil sought to draw on his own mystic life experiences to tell the story of "mythical Lucifer awakening in his pit of despair, rekindling his torch, and rising like a phoenix from the ashes of his own unmaking to begin his long journey from the dark recesses of the underworld — shedding his pride along the way in his uncompromising desire to regain the Beloved." Beausoleil sought to do this by creating dark and sinister sounding music that gradually evolves to a brighter and more uplifting finale. Lucifer Rising is primarily instrumental rock with an otherworldly orchestral feel.

== Reception ==
Professional ratings
Review scores
Source	Rating
AllMusic	4.5/5 stars

Critic J. Scott McClintock gave the soundtrack album 4.5 stars out of a possible 5 for Allmusic.com. Trying to judge the music on its own merits apart from Bobby Beausoleil's criminal history, McClintock wrote that he was "a talented arranger and a fine guitarist", creating music reminiscent of both early Pink Floyd and composer Claude Debussy.

== Soundtrack listing ==
Lucifer Rising: The Soundtrack Album Side one
No.	Title	Writer(s)	Length
1.	"Part I"	Beausoleil	4:10
2.	"Part II"	Beausoleil	5:57
3.	"Part III"	Beausoleil	5:43
4.	"Part IV"	Beausoleil	1:44

Side two
No.	Title	Writer(s)	Length
5.	"Part V"	Beausoleil	15:44
6.	"Part VI"	Beausoleil	10:14

== Personnel ==
- Kenneth Anger – director and filmmaker
- Bobby Beausoleil – soundtrack composer, electric guitar, bass guitar, synthesizer, recordist
- Clem Grogan – electric guitar
- Rick Sutton – electric piano, synthesizer
- Andy Thurston – drums
- Chuck Gordon − bass
- Tim Wills – Fender Rhodes
- Randy Charlton − drums
- Robert Gadbury − sparks
- Page Wood – film poster design; also used on cover of 1981 soundtrack LP
- Michael Moynihan – liner notes (2005 Arcanum reissue)
- Robert Ferbrache - reissue mastering
