= Zachary Lazar =

American novelist

- Born: 1968 (age 57–58); Phoenix, Arizona, U.S.
- Education: Brown University (AB); Iowa Writers' Workshop (MFA)
- Occupation: Novelist
- Website: www.zacharylazar.com

Zachary Lazar (born 1968) is an American novelist. Lazar was born in Phoenix, Arizona. He earned an A.B. degree in Comparative Literature from Brown University (1990) and M.F.A from the University of Iowa Iowa Writer's Workshop (1993). In 2015, he was the third recipient of the John Updike Award from the American Academy of Arts and Letters, "given biennially to a writer in mid-career whose work has demonstrated consistent excellence."

== Career ==
Lazar published his first novel, Aaron, Approximately, in 1998. His second novel, Sway, was a finalist for the Discover Great New Writers Award at Barnes & Noble and was an Editor's Choice at The New York Times Book Review. Appropriating such real-life iconic figures as the early Rolling Stones, Charles Manson acolyte Bobby Beausoleil, and the avant-garde filmmaker Kenneth Anger, Sway is a novelistic exploration of the rise and fall of the Sixties counterculture. The story of the film Invocation of My Demon Brother, its making, and the people involved were the inspiration for it. It was selected as a best book of 2008 by the Los Angeles Times, Publishers Weekly, Newsday, Rolling Stone, the St. Louis Post-Dispatch, and other publications.

In 2009, Lazar published the memoir Evening's Empire: The Story of My Father's Murder. It was selected as a Best Book of 2009 by the Chicago Tribune.

Lazar's third novel, I Pity the Poor Immigrant, tells the story of a fictional American journalist whose investigation into the killing of an Israeli poet leads her into a millennia-old history of violence that encompasses the American and Israeli mafias, the biblical figure of King David, and the Jewish gangster Meyer Lansky. The book was an Editor's Choice at The New York Times Book Review as well as one of that publications's 100 Notable Books of 2014.

In 2018, Lazar published the novel "Vengeance," about mass incarceration at Louisiana's Angola prison. It was the 2019 selection for One Book One New Orleans and also for the Tulane Reading Project, the common read for all incoming freshmen at Tulane University, and was longlisted for the Joyce Carol Oates Prize.

Lazar's 2022 novel "The Apartment on Calle Uruguay" was also longlisted for the Joyce Carol Oates Prize. It was the occasion for a career retrospective review in The New York Review of Books by Andrew Martin.

Lazar is a frequent contributor to The New York Times Book Review. His articles and reviews have appeared in The New York Times Magazine, the Los Angeles Times, Newsday, Bomb, and elsewhere. In 2011, he joined the faculty of Tulane University.

== Awards and grants ==
- Fine Arts Work Center, 1994–5
- James Michener-Copernicus Society Award, 1998
- Barnes & Noble Discover Award finalist for Sway
- Guggenheim Fellowship (2009–2010)
- Hodder Fellow, Princeton University (2009–2010)
- John Updike Award, American Academy of Arts and Letters (2015)
- One Book One New Orleans, "Vengeance," (2019)

== Books ==
- Aaron, Approximately (1998), ISBN 0-06-039211-8
- Sway (2008), ISBN 0-316-11309-3
- Evening's Empire: The Story of My Father's Murder (2009), ISBN 978-0-316-03768-6
- I Pity the Poor Immigrant (2014), ISBN 978-0-316-25403-8
- Vengeance (2018), ISBN 978-1-936787-77-7
- "The Apartment on Calle Uruguay" (2022), ISBN 978-1646221745
