= Fireworks (1947 film) =

1947 film by Kenneth Anger

- Directed by: Kenneth Anger
- Starring: Kenneth Anger
- Music by: Ottorino Respighi
- Distributed by: Cinema 16
- Release date: 1947
- Running time: 14 minutes
- Country: United States

Fireworks is a 1947 homoerotic experimental short film by Kenneth Anger. Filmed in his parents' home in Beverly Hills, California, over a long weekend while they were away, the film stars Anger and explicitly explores themes of homosexuality and sadomasochism. It is the earliest of his works to survive. Fireworks is known for being the first gay narrative film in the United States.

Anger synopsizes the film thus: "A dissatisfied dreamer awakes, goes out in the night seeking a 'light' and is drawn through the needle's eye. A dream of a dream, he returns to bed less empty than before." Adding later, "This flick is all I have to say about being seventeen, the United States Navy, American Christmas, and the Fourth of July."

== Plot ==
The film opens with the image of a sailor holding a lifeless body. A sleeping man (portrayed by Anger) wakes up in bed and gets dressed. The dreamer walks through a door labeled "Gents", to find himself in a bar. He admires the body of a muscular sailor and offers his cigarette, only for the sailor to attack him. The sailor uses a flaming bundle of sticks to light the dreamer's cigarette.

His smoking is interrupted by a group of sailors who chase the man and pin him to the ground. They beat the dreamer and reach into his chest to find a ticking meter inside him. White liquid pours down his body. A sailor unbuttons the crotch of his pants to reveal a Roman candle, which shoots sparks into the air. The dreamer appears with a Christmas tree as a headdress, moving toward a fireplace in which several photographs of the opening shot are burning. The dreamer then appears asleep in bed, next to a man whose head is radiating light.

== Production ==
=== Development ===
During the Zoot Suit Riots, Anger witnessed a group of sailors in white uniforms chase down Mexican men and attack them. He had a persistent dream of men in white uniforms attacking at night, which eventually became a dream about people chasing him. This dream became the premise for Fireworks.

Anger stars in Fireworks as the dreamer, and Gordon Gray plays the sailor from the opening scene. According to Anger's account, he found the cast of Fireworks while sitting in on film classes at UCLA. He convinced some classmates who were in the Navy to steal a few thousand feet of Navy film stock for him to use. They acted in his film, using their summer uniforms as costumes. Ed Earle, a friend of Anger's, has disputed this account, saying that the cast were not sailors, but "people dressed up…He talked everyone into doing it because it was almost as though he was going to make the ultimate porno film."

=== Principal photography ===
Anger upgraded from a spring-wound camera when his grandmother gave him a Bell & Howell 16 mm camera as a birthday gift, which allowed him to film at 24 frames per second. Anger placed the shoot at his parents' home in Beverly Hills over three days; however, his older brother Bob has stated that Fireworks was shot at a home in the Hollywood Hills. One scene was shot in a public bathroom at a park in Olive Hill, California.

=== Post-production ===
"Pines of the Appian Way"
A performance of the last movement of Pines of Rome (1924)

When editing the film, Anger directly scratched the film stock for two scenes. Worried that he might get in trouble trying to sell prints of Fireworks by mail, he scratched out his genitals from one brief shot in a public urinal. In the film's ending, Anger etched in a corona of light around a man's face. He scored the film with Ottorino Respighi's Pines of Rome.

== Themes ==
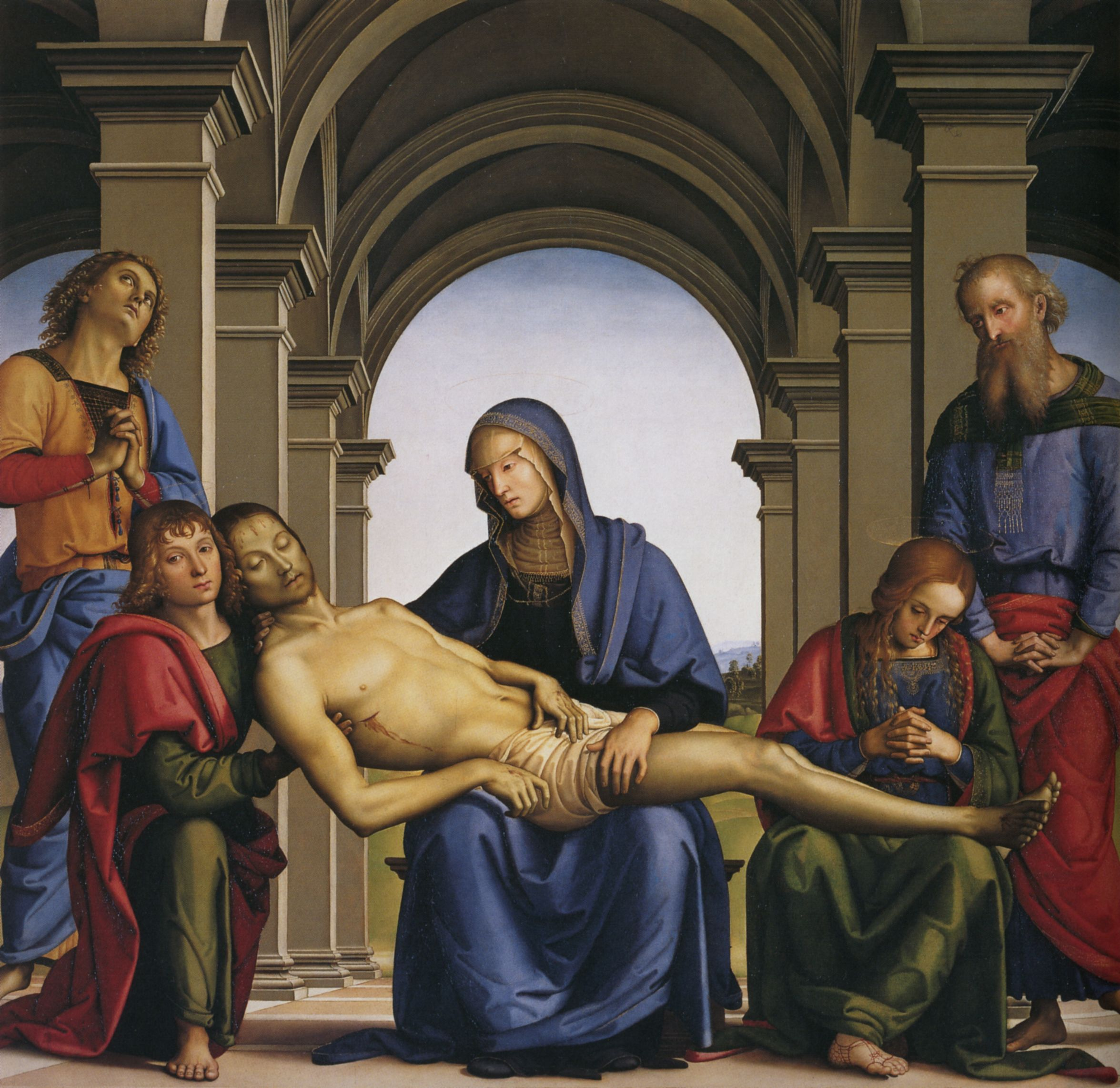
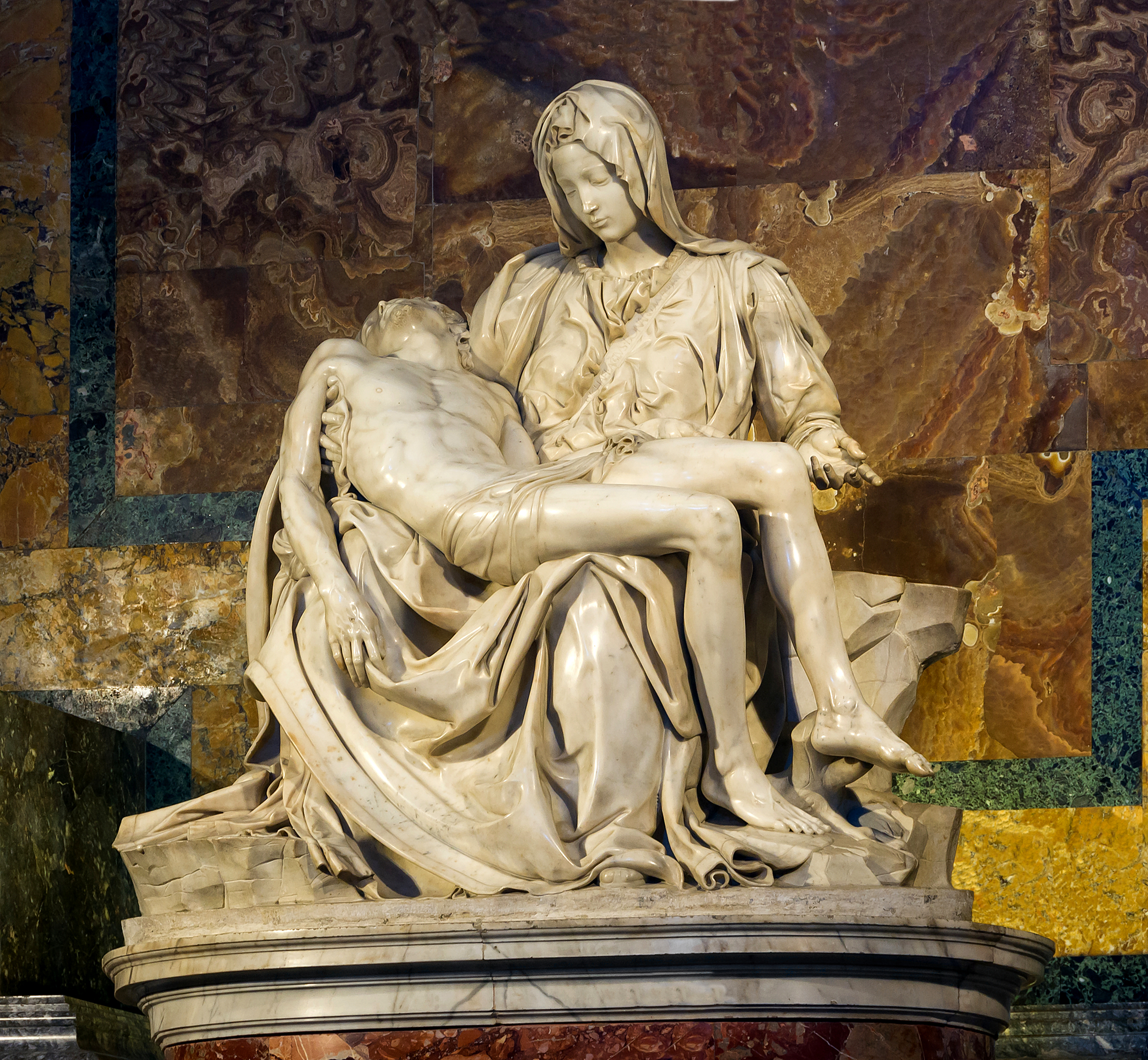
Anger draws on the subject of the pietà (left by Perugino, right by Michelangelo) in his image of a sailor carrying the wounded dreamer (bottom).

Anger was a disciple of occultist Aleister Crowley, through whose teachings Fireworks can be read. The dreamer in the film follows a symbolic process of death, rebirth, and self-realization similar to the Liber Pyramidos, a ritual for self-initiation. In this sense, the "light" sought by the dreamer is a pun, playing off of Lucifer.

The opening scene in which a sailor carries the lifeless body of the dreamer closely follows the Christian image of the pietà, in which the Virgin Mary cradles the dead body of Jesus. Anger's camp re-creation is emphasized with intense, expressionistic lighting of the subject against a dark background; thunder and lightning; and a dolly shot that gradually reveals the scene. This scene and its reappearance as a photograph later in the film conflate masochistic desire with redemptive suffering. Anger has described the role of the sailor by saying that he "was a kind of sex symbol on one level, and on another level there was a great deal of ambivalence and hostility, and fear in the image."

== Release ==
Fireworks was screened privately several times before its public premiere. It first screened publicly in 1947 at the Coronet Theatre in Los Angeles. Anger sold the first print of Fireworks to Alfred Kinsey. Cinema 16 acquired and distributed the film.

Anger continued to make changes to the film after its original release. These edits included truncating a scene where the dreamer writhes on a bathroom floor before the sailors attack him and shortening the moment when Gordon Gray unbuttons his pants to reveal a firecracker. One version used hand tinting for the candle atop the Christmas tree and the halo of light. The use of color bridged Fireworks with Anger's later film Eaux d'Artifice, which similarly ends with a hand-tinted object.

=== Rohauer case ===
Raymond Rohauer of the Coronet Theatre obtained a copy of the film which Anger attempted to recover. After screening Fireworks on October 11, 1957, Rohauer was arrested on obscenity charges. William C. Doran served as prosecutor, with much of his case focusing on the Coronet and its homosexual patrons rather than the content of the film. Doran zeroed in on the sailor with a firecracker and, despite the lack of nudity in Fireworks, persistently referred to it as "the penis scene". Rohauer was found guilty in February 1958 and received a sentence of three years probation with a $250 fine.

Civil rights attorney Stanley Fleishman appealed the decision to the California Supreme Court, which ruled in favor of Rohauer. The court ruled that homosexuality was a valid subject of artistic expression and that overt reference to it could not be considered obscenity. This ruling became a landmark decision for freedom of speech in the United States. Fleishman successfully defended one of Anger's later films, Scorpio Rising, in a similar obscenity trial.

=== Critical reception ===
Critic Lewis Jacobs of The Hollywood Reporter wrote that the taboo subject matter was effectively conveyed through "the film's intensity of imagery, the strength and precision of its shots and continuity," making Fireworks a work of "rare individuality which no literal summary of its qualities can communicate." Tennessee Williams called Fireworks "the most exciting use of cinema I have ever seen." Anger submitted Fireworks to the Festival du Film Maudit in 1949, where the jury awarded it the Poetic Film Prize.

== Legacy ==
Anger's 1953 film Eaux d'Artifice takes its title from feux d'artifice, the French translation of fireworks. His 1969 film Invocation of My Demon Brother is a remake of Fireworks. Anthology Film Archives added Fireworks to its Essential Cinema Repertory collection.

Fireworks was an influence on Robert Duncan's poetry. His poem "The Earth" explicitly mentions the film, and his poems "The Torso" and "An Illustration" both make reference to it.
