= Rabbit moon =

Rabbit moon or variant may refer to:

- Moon Rabbit, a mythological creature created by patterns on the moon, similar to the Man in the Moon
- Rabbit in the Moon, US musical band
- Rabbit's Moon (1950/1972/1979), a US short film
- Rabbit Moon (album), 1997 album by Tarwater (band)
