= Kustom Kar Kommandos =

1965 film by Kenneth Anger

- Title card
- Directed by: Kenneth Anger
- Starring: Sandy Trent
- Release date: 1965
- Running time: 3 min.
- Country: United States

Kustom Kar Kommandos is a 1965 experimental film by Kenneth Anger.

== Plot ==
The 3-minute short features panning shots of a young man (Sandy Trent) buffing a customized hot rod in front of an amorphous pink background, to the tune of "Dream Lover" by The Paris Sisters. Imagery and the choice of camera angles imply an intense eroticism.

== Production ==
Production of the film was funded by a $10,000 grant from the Ford Foundation to Anger following the completion of his biker-themed film Scorpio Rising. Anger's original intent for Kustom Kar Kommandos was to create a feature-length film centering on the role of cars as fetish objects among young American males. However, the Ford Foundation's grant quickly ran out, and only one 3-minute episode was ever produced.
