= Brian Butler (artist) =

American artist and musician

- Occupations: Artist; filmmaker; musician; music video director; writer
- Known for: The Bartzabel Working; Brush of Baphomet; Night of Pan; Uncle Goddamn

Brian Butler is an American artist, filmmaker and musician from Los Angeles, California influenced by the dark arts.

== Career ==
Butler is an artist and filmmaker who explores the dark arts that influence his art pieces, music videos and psychedelic short films.

In 2013, Butler staged a performance of The Bartzabel Working by Aleister Crowley. His film Babylon Working starred Paz de la Huerta and screened at the Museum of Contemporary Art, Los Angeles. Butler produced several films with Kenneth Anger such as Night of Pan with Vincent Gallo. He collaborated with Anger in the band Technicolor Skull and was his manager.

Butler filmed The Dove and the Serpent in Normandy and worked on the music video Modern Art by Black Lips.

== Filmography ==
Year	Title	Producer	Director	Editor	Actor	Screenwriter	Cinematographer	Notes
2000	Ich will!	Yes	No	No	No	No	No	
2004	Disinfo Nation	Segment	No	No	No	No	No	Series
2004	Uncle Goddamn	Yes	No	Yes	No	Yes	No	
2009	My Surfing Lucifer	Yes	No	No	No	No	No	
2009	Night of Pan	Yes	Yes	Yes	Yes	Yes	No	Magus
2009	Brush of Baphomet	Yes	No	Yes	No	No	Yes	
2010	Missoni	Yes	No	No	No	No	No	
2010	42 One Dream Rush	No	Yes	No	Yes	No	No	Magus
2011	The Dove and the Serpent	No	Yes	No	Yes	No	No	
2019	Cinemagician – Conversations with Kenneth Anger	No	No	No	No	No	Yes	
