= Eaux d'Artifice =

1953 film by Kenneth Anger

Eaux d'artifice
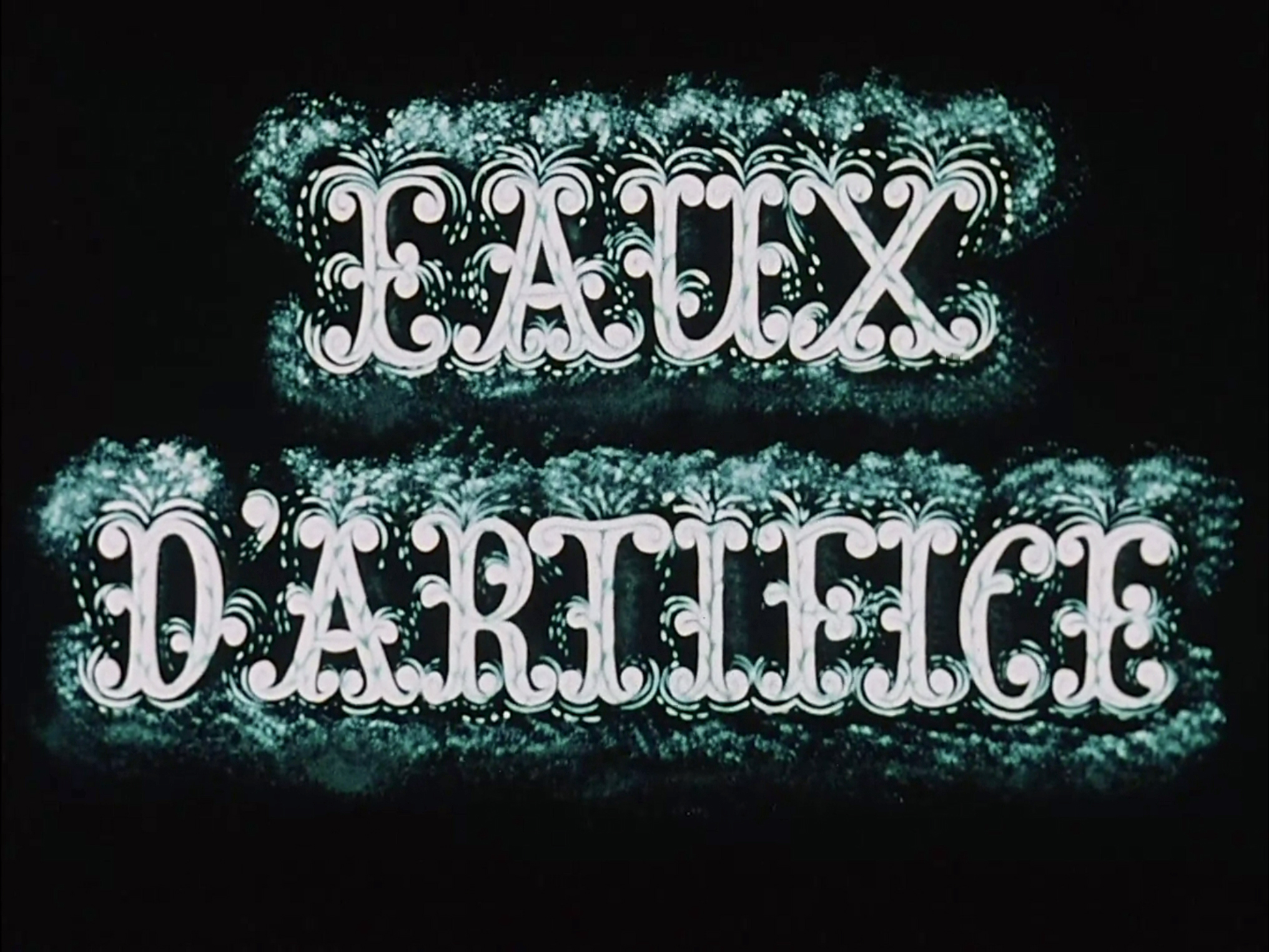
- Directed by: Kenneth Anger
- Produced by: Kenneth Anger
- Starring: Carmilla Salvatorelli
- Cinematography: Kenneth Anger
- Edited by: Kenneth Anger
- Release date: 1953
- Running time: 12 minutes
- Country: United States
- Language: English

Eaux d'artifice (1953) is a short experimental film by Kenneth Anger.

== Summary ==
Full film

The film consists entirely of a woman dressed in eighteenth-century clothes who wanders amidst the garden fountains of the Villa d'Este ("a Hide and Seek in a night-time labyrinth") to the sounds of Vivaldi's "Four Seasons", until she steps into a fountain and momentarily disappears.

== Production ==
The film was shot in the Villa d'Este in Tivoli, Italy. The actress, Carmilla Salvatorelli (not "Carmello"), was "a little midget" Anger had met through Federico Fellini. Anger used a short actress to suggest a different sense of scale, whereby the monuments seemed bigger (a technique he said was inspired by etchings of the gardens in the Villa d'Este by Giovanni Battista Piranesi).

== Inspiration ==
The title, a play on words, is meant to suggest Feux d'artifice (Fireworks), in obvious reference to Anger's earlier 1947 work. Film critic Scott MacDonald has suggested that Fireworks was a film about the repression of (the film-maker's) homosexuality in the United States, whereas Eaux d'Artifice "suggests an explosion of pleasure and freedom."

== Legacy ==
In 1993, this short film was selected for preservation in the United States National Film Registry by the Library of Congress as being "culturally, historically, or aesthetically significant".

== See also ==
- List of avant-garde films of the 1950s
