= Kris Jensen =

American musician (born 1942)

- Born: Peter Kristian Jensen; April 4, 1942 (age 84); New Haven, Connecticut, U.S.
- Genres: Teen pop; rock and roll
- Occupations: Singer, musician
- Instruments: Vocals, guitar, bass
- Labels: Colpix, Kapp, Hickory

Peter Kristian Jensen (born April 4, 1942) is an American singer, bassist, and guitarist.

He was born in New Haven, Connecticut, United States. Jensen began his career in music cutting records for Colpix, for whom he recorded his first single in 1959. He graduated from high school in Fort Lauderdale in 1960 and then recorded with Kapp Records and its subsidiary, Leader Records. In 1962, he moved on to Hickory Records, where he began recording many numbers by Nashville staff songwriters such as Boudleaux and Felice Bryant, Roy Orbison, Joe Melson, and John D. Loudermilk.

In 1962 he recorded "Torture", which Loudermilk had originally written for The Everly Brothers. The song became a hit, reaching No. 20 on the Billboard Hot 100, and after its success the Everly Brothers decided to record it as well. The song proved to be Jensen's only hit, though he recorded at least 30 songs over the course of his career. Kris worked for record producer Snuff Garrett in the 1970’s. "Torture" was featured in the soundtrack of the avant-garde film, Scorpio Rising, directed by Kenneth Anger. Reissues of his catalog were released to LP by Bear Family Records in 1979 and to CD by Sparkletone Records in 1995.
