= Kenneth Anger =

American filmmaker and writer (1927–2023)

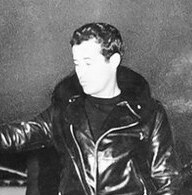
- Kenneth Anger in 1964
- Born: Kenneth Wilbur Anglemyer; February 3, 1927; Santa Monica, California, U.S.
- Died: May 11, 2023 (aged 96); Yucca Valley, California, U.S.
- Occupations: Filmmaker; actor; writer
- Years active: 1937–2010s
- Movement: Avant-garde cinema
- Awards: Maya Deren Award (1996)

Kenneth Anger (born Kenneth Wilbur Anglemyer; February 3, 1927 – May 11, 2023) was an American underground experimental filmmaker, actor, and writer. Working exclusively in short films, he produced almost 40 works beginning in 1937, nine of which have been grouped together as the "Magick Lantern Cycle". Anger's films variously merge surrealism with homoeroticism and the occult, and have been described as containing "elements of erotica, documentary, psychodrama, and spectacle". He has been called "one of America's first openly gay filmmakers", with several films released before homosexuality was legalized in the U.S. Anger also explored occult themes in many of his films; he was fascinated by the English occultist Aleister Crowley and an adherent of Thelema, the religion Crowley founded.

Anger was born into a middle-class Presbyterian family in Santa Monica, California. He began making short films when he was 14 years old, although his first film to gain any recognition was the homoerotic Fireworks (1947). The work's controversial nature led to his trial on obscenity charges, but he was acquitted. A friendship and working relationship subsequently began with pioneering sexologist Alfred Kinsey. Moving to Europe, Anger produced a number of shorts inspired by the avant-garde scene there, such as Eaux d'Artifice (1953) and Rabbit's Moon (1971).

Returning to the U.S. in the early 1950s, Anger began work on several new projects, including the films Inauguration of the Pleasure Dome (1954), Scorpio Rising (1964), Kustom Kar Kommandos (1965), and the gossip book Hollywood Babylon (1965). The latter became infamous for various dubious and sensationalist claims, many of which were disproved, though some remain urban legends. Getting to know several notable countercultural figures of the time, Anger involved them in his subsequent Thelema-themed works, Invocation of My Demon Brother (1969) and Lucifer Rising (1972). After failing to produce a sequel to Lucifer Rising, which he attempted through the mid-1980s, Anger retired from filmmaking, instead focusing on Hollywood Babylon II (1984). In the 2000s he returned to filmmaking, producing shorts for various film festivals and events.

Anger described filmmakers such as Auguste and Louis Lumière, Georges Méliès, and Maya Deren as influences, and has been cited as an important influence on such directors as Martin Scorsese, David Lynch, and John Waters. Kinsey Today argued that Anger had "a profound impact on the work of many other filmmakers and artists, as well as on music video as an emergent art form using dream sequence, dance, fantasy, and narrative." The distinctive aesthetics of music videos, defined by a new visual vocabulary, reflect Kenneth Anger's use of surreal and occult imagery, as well as his focus on mood, primary colors, symbolism, and unconventional narrative forms.

== Biography ==
=== 1927–1936: Early life ===
Kenneth Anger was born as Kenneth Wilbur Anglemyer on February 3, 1927, in Santa Monica, California. His family was Presbyterian, but he became more interested in the occult. His father, Wilbur Anglemyer, was of German ancestry and had been born in Troy, Ohio, while his disabled mother, Lillian Coler (the older of the pair), had English ancestry. Anger's parents met at Ohio State University and after marrying had their first child, Jean Anglemyer, in 1918, followed by a second, Robert "Bob" Anglemyer, in 1921. That year they moved to Santa Monica to be near Lillian's mother, Bertha Coler, who had recently moved there. There Wilbur got a job as an electrical engineer at Douglas Aircraft, earning enough money that they could live comfortably as a middle-class family.

Kenneth Anger, their third and final child, was born in 1927. Growing up, he did not get along with his parents or siblings. His brother Bob later claimed that as the youngest child, Kenneth had been spoiled by his mother and grandmother and became somewhat "bratty". His grandmother Bertha was a strong influence on the young Kenneth and supported the family financially during the Great Depression. It was she who first took Kenneth to the cinema, to see a double bill of The Singing Fool and Thunder Over Mexico. Bertha encouraged his artistic interests and later moved into a house in Hollywood with another woman, Miss Diggy, who also encouraged Kenneth. He developed an early interest in film and enjoyed reading the movie tie-in Big Little books. Kenneth later said, "I was a child prodigy who never got smarter." He remembered attending the Santa Monica Cotillion, where he met Shirley Temple, with whom he once danced.

Anger claimed in Hollywood Babylon II that he played the Changeling Prince in the 1935 Warner Brothers film A Midsummer Night's Dream, but the character was played by a girl named Sheila Brown. Anger's unofficial biographer, Bill Landis, remarked in 1995 that the Changeling Prince was definitely "Anger as a child; visually, he's immediately recognizable".

=== 1937–1946: First films ===
Anger's first film was created in 1937, when he was ten years old. The short, Ferdinand the Bull, was shot on the remains of 16 mm film that had been left unused after the Anglemyers had made home movies with it on a family vacation to Yosemite National Park. In Ferdinand the Bull, which has never been made publicly available, Kenneth dressed as a matador, wearing a cape, while two of his friends from the Boy Scouts played the bull. His second work, created when he was 14, was Who Has Been Rocking My Dreamboat (1941), which Anger has often called his first proper film. It was made from footage of children playing during the summer, accompanied with popular songs by bands including the Ink Spots. The next year, he produced another amateur film, Prisoner of Mars, which was heavily influenced by Flash Gordon. In this science fiction-inspired feature, in which he played the protagonist, Anger added elements taken from the Greek mythological myth of the Minotaur and constructed a small volcano in his back yard as a homemade special effect. Many of these early films are considered lost, with Anger burning much of his previous work in 1967.

I've always considered movies evil; the day that cinema was invented was a black day for mankind.

— Kenneth Anger

In 1944, the Anglemyers moved to Hollywood to move in with family, and Kenneth began attending Beverly Hills High School. It was here that he met Marilyn Granas, who had once been the stand-in for Shirley Temple, and he asked her – alongside another classmate and an older woman – to appear in his next film project, which was ultimately titled Escape Episode. Revolving partially around the occult, the picture was filmed in a "spooky old castle" in Hollywood and was subsequently screened at the Coronet Theatre in Los Angeles. Around this time, Anger also began attending screenings of silent films at Clara Grossman's art gallery, through which he met a fellow filmmaker, Curtis Harrington, with whom he formed Creative Film Associates (CFA). Harrington is said to have introduced Anger to the work of English occultist Aleister Crowley. Crowley's philosophy of Thelema exerted a profound influence on Anger's career. CFA was founded to distribute experimental or "underground" films, such as those of Maya Deren and John and James Whitney, as well as Anger's and Harrington's.

Anger's interest in the occult deepened in high school. He first indirectly encountered the subject through reading L. Frank Baum's Oz books as a child, with their accompanying Rosicrucian philosophies. He was also interested in the works of the French ceremonial magician Eliphas Levi, as well as Sir James Frazer's The Golden Bough, although his favorite writings were Crowley's; he eventually converted to Thelema, the religion Crowley founded.

=== 1947–1949: Fireworks and early career ===
Anger discovered his homosexuality at a time when homosexual acts were illegal in the United States, and he began associating with the underground gay scene. At some point in the mid-1940s, he was arrested by police in a "homosexual entrapment", after which he decided to move out of his parents' home, gaining his own apartment largely financed by his grandmother, and abandoning the name Anglemyer in favor of Anger. He started attending the University of Southern California (USC), where he studied cinema, and also began experimenting with the use of mind-altering drugs like cannabis and peyote. It was then that he decided to produce a film that would deal with his sexuality, just as other gay avant-garde filmmakers like Willard Maas were doing in that decade. The result was the short film Fireworks, which was created in 1947 and exhibited publicly in 1948.

Upon Fireworks's release, Anger was arrested on obscenity charges. He was acquitted after the case went to the Supreme Court of California, which deemed the film art, not pornography. Twenty years old when he made Fireworks, Anger claimed to have been 17, presumably to present himself as more of an enfant terrible. A homoerotic work lasting only 14 minutes, the film revolves around a young man (played by Anger) associating with various navy sailors, who eventually turn on him, stripping him naked, beating him to death, and ripping open his chest to find a compass inside. Several fireworks then explode, accompanied by a burning Christmas tree. The final shot shows the young man lying in bed next to another shirtless man. Of this film, Anger said in 1966: "This flick is all I have to say about being 17, the United States Navy, American Christmas and the fourth of July." He continuously altered and adapted the film until 1980. It was distributed on VHS in 1986.

One of the first people to buy a copy of Fireworks was the sexologist Alfred Kinsey of the Institute for Sex Research. He and Anger struck up a friendship that lasted until Kinsey's death, during which time Anger aided Kinsey in his research. According to Anger's unofficial biographer Bill Landis, Kinsey became a "father figure" whom Anger "could both interact with and emulate." In 1949, Anger began work on the film Puce Women, which unlike Fireworks was filmed in color. It starred Yvonne Marquis as a glamorous woman going about her daily life; Anger later said: "Puce Women was my love affair with Hollywood ... with all the great goddesses of the silent screen. They were to be filmed in their homes; I was, in effect, filming ghosts." Due to lack of funding, only one scene was ever produced, eventually released under the title Puce Moment. That same year, Anger directed The Love That Whirls, a film based on Aztec human sacrifice; because of the nudity it contained, it was destroyed by technicians at the film lab who deemed it obscene.

=== 1950–1953: France, Rabbit's Moon and Eaux d'Artifice ===
In 1950, Anger moved to Paris, France, where he initially stayed with friends who had been forced to leave Hollywood after being blacklisted for having formerly belonged to trade union organizations. He later said he traveled to Paris after receiving a letter from the French director Jean Cocteau in which he told Anger of his admiration for Fireworks (shown in 1949 at Festival du Film Maudit in Biarritz). Upon Anger's arrival, the two became friends, with Cocteau giving him permission to make a movie of his ballet The Young Man and Death, although at the time the project had no financial backers. In Paris, Anger continued producing short films; in 1950 he started filming Rabbit's Moon (also known as La lune des lapins), about a clown who stares up at the Moon, where a rabbit lives, as in Japanese mythology. Anger produced 20 minutes of footage at the Films du Pantheon Studio before he was rushed out of the building, leaving the film uncompleted. He stored the footage in the disorganized archives of the Cinémathèque française and retrieved it in 1970, when he finally finished and released the film. Cinémathèque française head Henri Langlois gave Anger prints of Sergei Eisenstein's Que Viva Mexico!, which he attempted to put into Eisenstein's original order.

[D'Este was] a sexual pervert. There are very few things I call sexual perversion, but he liked to fuck goats, and that is technically a perversion.

— Kenneth Anger

In 1953, Anger traveled to Rome, Italy, where he planned to make a film about the 16th-century occultist Cardinal d'Este. To do so, he began filming at the garden of the Villa d'Este in Tivoli, in which a lady in 18th-century dress walked through the gardens, which featured many waterfalls (an allusion to the fact that d'Este allegedly sexually enjoyed urination), accompanied by the music of Vivaldi. This was supposed to be only the first of four scenes, but the others were not made; the resulting one-scene film was titled Eaux d'artifice. Landis remarked, "It's one of Anger's most tranquil works; his editing makes it soft, lush, and inviting. Eaux d'Artifice remains a secretive romp through a private garden, all for the masked figure's and the viewer-voyeur's pleasure."

=== 1953–1960: Inauguration of the Pleasure Dome and Hollywood Babylon ===
In 1953, soon after the production of Eaux d'Artifice, Anger's mother died, and he temporarily returned to the U.S. to assist with the distribution of her estate. During this return, he began to once more immerse himself in California's artistic scene, befriending the filmmaker Stan Brakhage, who had been inspired by Fireworks. The two collaborated on a film, but it was confiscated at the film lab for obscenity and presumably destroyed. Around this time, two of Anger's friends, the couple Renate Druks and Paul Mathison, held a party with the theme "Come As Your Madness"; Anger attended dressed in drag as the ancient Greek goddess Hekate. The party and its many costumes inspired Anger, who produced a painting of it, and asked several of those who attended to appear in a new film he was creating, Inauguration of the Pleasure Dome. Inauguration, which was created in 1954, is a 38-minute surrealist work featuring many Crowleyan and Thelemite themes, with many of the various characters personifying various pagan gods such as Isis, Osiris, and Pan. One of the actresses in the film was Marjorie Cameron, the widow of Jack Parsons, the influential American Thelemite who had died a few years earlier. Anger played Hekate. He subsequently exhibited the film at various European film festivals, winning the Prix du Ciné-Club Belge and the Prix de l'Age d'Or, as well as screening it in the form of a projected triptych at Expo 58, the World Fair held in Brussels in 1958.

In 1955, Anger and Kinsey traveled to the derelict Abbey of Thelema at Cefalù in Sicily to film a short documentary, Thelema Abbey. Crowley had used the abbey for his commune during the 1920s, and Anger restored many of the erotic wall paintings that were found there, as well as performing certain Crowleyan rituals at the site. The documentary was made for the British television series Omnibus, but was later lost. The next year, after Kinsey's death, Anger decided to return to Paris; he was described at the time as being "extremely remote and lonely".

In desperate need of money, Anger and ghostwriter Elliott Stein wrote a book, Hollywood Babylon, in which he compiled gossip about celebrities, some of which he claimed (with no corroboration or citing of sources) he had been told, including that Rudolph Valentino liked to play a sexually submissive role to dominant women; that Walt Disney was addicted to opiates (reflected in the character of Goofy, who's perpetually stoned on cannabis); and the nature of the deaths of Peg Entwistle and Lupe Vélez. The work was not published in the U.S. initially, and was first released by the French publisher Jean-Jacques Pauvert. A pirated (and incomplete) version was printed in the U.S. in 1965, with the official American version not published until 1974. In response to a lawsuit Gloria Swanson filed against Anger and his publishers, he sent her a foot-long, sugar-filled coffin with "Here lies Gloria" painted on the lid and lined with a paper printed with Hebrew letters spelling "shalom". The coffin is preserved at the University of Texas Harry Ransom Center collection. After obtaining some financial backing from the publication of Hollywood Babylon, his next film project was The Story of O; it was essentially a piece of erotica loosely based on the novel of the same name featuring a heterosexual couple engaged in sadomasochistic sexual activities, although it refrained from showing any explicit sexual images.

=== 1961–1965: Scorpio Rising and Kustom Kar Kommandos ===
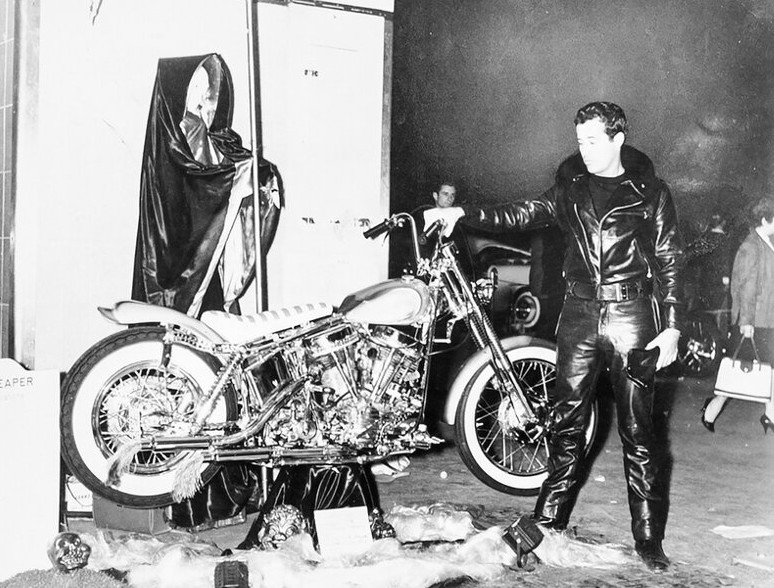
Anger with a motorcycle on the set of Scorpio Rising

In 1961, Anger once more returned to the U.S., where he lived for a time with Marjorie Cameron. He began work on a new feature, Scorpio Rising, about the biker subculture. For this, he employed a biker named Richard McAuley, and filmed him and some of his friends messing around, adding to it scenes of McAuley, or "Scorpio" as he became known, desecrating a derelict church. Anger incorporated more controversial visuals into the piece, including Nazi iconography, nudity, and clips of the life of Jesus Christ taken from the Family Films' The Living Bible: Last Journey to Jerusalem, images of Jesus which are intercut with those of Scorpio. The film has a soundtrack of popular 1960s songs, including "Blue Velvet" by Bobby Vinton, "Torture" by Kris Jensen, and "I Will Follow Him" by Little Peggy March. Anger called the film "a death mirror held up to American culture ... Thanatos in chrome, black leather, and bursting jeans." It immediately became popular on the underground cinema scene but was soon brought to court on obscenity charges. The jury ruled in favor of the prosecutors and Scorpio Rising was banned; the ban was overturned on appeal to the California Supreme Court.

Now living in San Francisco, Anger approached the Ford Foundation, which had just started a program of grants to filmmakers. He showed the foundation his ideas for a new artistic short, Kustom Kar Kommandos, which they approved of, giving him a grant of $10,000. Anger spent much of the money on living expenses and alterations to some of his films, so that by the time he actually created Kustom Kar Kommandos, it was only one scene long. The homoerotic film involved various shots of a young man polishing a drag strip racing car, accompanied by a pink background and The Paris Sisters' song "Dream Lover". Soon after, Anger struck a deal that allowed Hollywood Babylon to be officially published for the first time in the U.S., where it proved a success, selling two million copies during the 1960s. Around the same time Anger also translated Lo Duca's History of Eroticism into English for American publication.

=== 1966–1969: The hippie movement and Invocation of My Demon Brother ===
The mid-1960s saw the emergence of the hippie scene and increasing use of the mind-altering drugs Anger had been using for many years. In particular, the hallucinogen LSD, at the time still legal in the U.S., was very popular, and in 1966 Anger released a version of Inauguration of the Pleasure Dome he called the "Sacred Mushroom Edition", which was screened to people while taking LSD, thereby heightening their sensory experience. By this time, Anger had become well known in the American underground scene, and several cinemas screened his better-known films all in one event. With his growing fame, Anger began to react to publicity much as his idol Crowley had done, for instance calling himself "the most monstrous moviemaker in the underground", a pun on the fact that British tabloids had labeled Crowley "the wickedest man in the world" in the 1920s.

Anger's underground fame allowed him to increasingly associate with other celebrities, including Anton LaVey, the founder of the Church of Satan, who named Anger godfather to his daughter Zeena Schreck. Despite their differing philosophies, Anger and LaVey became good friends and remained so for many years. But Anger also resented some celebrities, such as Andy Warhol, who at the time was achieving success not only in the art world but also in the underground film scene. In 1980, Anger threw paint on the front door of a house Warhol had recently moved out of.

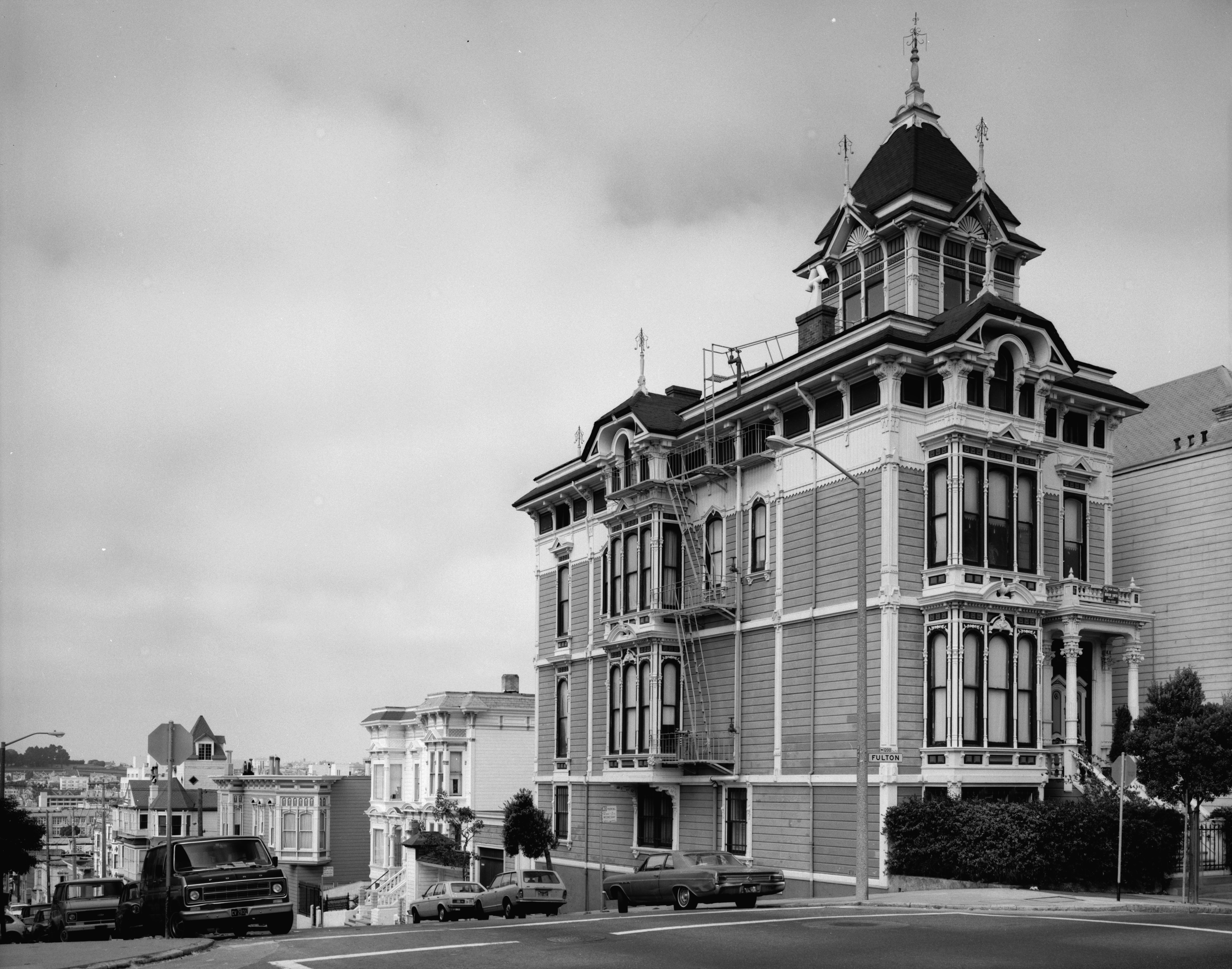
The ornate "Russian Embassy" house in San Francisco, where Anger lived in 1966 and 1967.

In 1966, Anger moved into the ground floor of the William Westerfeld House, a large 19th-century Victorian house in San Francisco also known as the "Russian Embassy". Around this time he began planning a new film, Lucifer Rising, echoing his Thelemite beliefs about the emerging Aeon of Horus. He tattooed Lucifer's name on his chest and began searching for a young man who could symbolically become Lucifer, "the Crowned and Conquering Child" of the new Aeon, for the film. While living at the Russian Embassy, he met and lived with various young men who could fill the role, eventually settling on Bobby Beausoleil. Beausoleil founded a band, the Magic Powerhouse of Oz, to record the film's soundtrack. In 1967, Anger said the footage he had been filming for Lucifer Rising had been stolen, accusing Beausoleil, who denied it. Landis quotes Beausoleil as saying, "[W]hat had happened was that Kenneth had spent all the money that was invested in Lucifer Rising" and that he therefore invented the story to satisfy the film's creditors. Beausoleil and Anger fell out, with the former getting involved with Charles Manson and the Manson Family. Beausoleil later tortured and murdered Gary Hinman in a drug robbery gone wrong, for which he is serving a life sentence as of 2023.

In the October 26, 1967, issue of The Village Voice, Anger publicly reinvented himself by placing a full-page ad declaring, "In Memoriam. Kenneth Anger. Filmmaker 1947–1967". He soon publicly reappeared, this time to claim he had burned all of his early work. The next year he traveled to London, where he first met John Paul Getty Jr., who became Anger's patron, and also met and befriended Mick Jagger and Keith Richards, members of The Rolling Stones, as well as actress/model Anita Pallenberg. Anger decided to use much of the footage created for Lucifer Rising in a new film, Invocation of My Demon Brother, which starred Beausoleil, LaVey, Jagger, Richards, and Anger, the music for which was composed by Jagger. It was released in 1969 and explored many of the Thelemic themes Anger had originally intended for Lucifer Rising. Author Gary Lachman believes the film "inaugurat[ed] the midnight movie cult at the Elgin Theatre." The story of the film, its making, and the people involved inspired Zachary Lazar's novel Sway.

=== 1970–1981: Lucifer Rising ===
Having used up much of the footage originally intended for Lucifer Rising in Invocation of My Demon Brother, Anger made a second attempt to complete Lucifer Rising. He persuaded the singer and actress Marianne Faithfull to appear in the film, and unsuccessfully tried to convince Jagger to play Lucifer; instead he offered his brother Chris the part. Anger subsequently filmed eight minutes of film and showed it to the British National Film Finance Corporation, which agreed to provide £15,000 for Anger to complete it – something that caused a level of outrage in the British press. With this money he could afford to fly the cast and crew to both West Germany and Egypt for filming.

Anger befriended Led Zeppelin guitarist Jimmy Page around this time, the two sharing a great interest in Crowley. At Page's invitation, he traveled to Page's new home in Scotland, Crowley's former residence Boleskine House, to help Page exorcise the building of what Page believed to be a headless man's ghost. Page agreed to produce the soundtrack for Lucifer Rising, and used the editing suite in his London home to shape the music. Anger later fell out with Page's partner, Charlotte, who kicked him out of the house. In retaliation he called a press conference in which he ridiculed Page and threatened to "throw a Kenneth Anger curse" on him. Page's music was dumped from the film and replaced in 1979 by music written and recorded by the imprisoned Beausoleil, with whom Anger had reconciled.

[Lucifer is] a teenage rebel. Lucifer must be played by a teenage boy. It's type-casting. I'm a pagan and the film is a real invocation of Lucifer. I'm much realer than von Stroheim. The film contained real black magicians, a real ceremony, real altars, real human blood, and a real magic circle consecrated with blood and cum.

— Kenneth Anger

Meanwhile, Anger, who had moved to a small apartment on Manhattan's Upper East Side, took the footage he had filmed for Rabbit's Moon in the 1950s, finally released the film in 1972, and again in a shorter version in 1979. Around the same time he also added a new soundtrack to Puce Moment and rereleased it. Also around this time, the publisher Marvin Miller produced a low-budget documentary film based on Hollywood Babylon without Anger's permission, which upset Anger and led to a lawsuit. Anger also created a short film, Senators in Bondage, available only to private collectors and never made publicly available. He had plans to make a film about Aleister Crowley titled The Wickedest Man in the World, but this project never got off the ground.

In 1981, a decade after starting the project, Anger finally finished and released the 30-minute Lucifer Rising. Based upon the Thelemite concept that mankind had entered a new period known as the Aeon of Horus, Lucifer Rising was full of occult symbolism, starring Miriam Gibril as the ancient Egyptian goddess Isis, Donald Cammell as her consort Osiris, Faithfull as Jewish mythological figure Lilith, and Leslie Huggins as Lucifer. Anger once again appeared in the film, as the Magus, the same role he played in Invocation of My Demon Brother.

=== 1982–1999: Retirement ===
Soon after the release of Lucifer Rising, a PBS documentary about Anger and his films, Kenneth Anger's Magick, was made. It was directed by Kit Fitzgerald, who later recalled interviewing Anger in his Manhattan apartment on a very hot July evening, during which he revealed that he was so broke that he had been forced to sell his air conditioner. Anger himself considered producing other films that would continue on from Lucifer Rising in a series, and he began calling his finished film Part I: Sign Language, to be followed by two further parts. But those projects were never finished, and Anger did not produce any further films for nearly two decades. In need of money, he released Hollywood Babylon II in 1984, as well as continuing to screen his films at various festivals and universities and continuing to attempt to produce Lucifer Rising II; around this time he began wearing an eyepatch to these public events, likely due to having been beaten up and getting a bruised eye, a story he told in various interviews, although partly changing the assailant in various versions.

A notorious incident occurred when Anger was invited to appear on Coca Crystal's television show in 1984. Upon arriving at the studio he demanded that somebody pay for his taxi ride there, and when they refused, he attacked talent coordinator Maureen Ivice and tried to drag her into his taxi before she was rescued by other members of staff. Anger reportedly escaped the scene by flinging a $100 bill at the cab driver and screaming, "Get me out of here!"

In 1986, Anger sold the video rights to his films, which finally appeared on VHS, allowing them to have greater publicity. The next year, he attended the Avignon Film Festival in France, where his work was being celebrated in commemoration of the 40th anniversary of Fireworks. Soon thereafter, he appeared in Kenneth Anger's Hollywood Babylon, a BBC documentary directed by Nigel Finch for the Arena series. In 1991, he moved to West Arenas Boulevard in Palm Springs, California, living in what was formerly the estate of his friend Ruby Keeler, where the British Film Institute sent Rebecca Wood to assist him in writing a never-produced autobiography. Instead, in 1995, Bill Landis, who had been an associate of Anger's in the early 1980s, wrote an unofficial biography of him. Anger condemned Landis's book, calling Landis "an avowed enemy".

In 1993, Anger visited Sydney and lectured at a season of his films at the Australian Film Institute Cinema. In an interview given at the time to Black and White magazine, he said he was staying in King's Cross and putting the finishing touches on the final treatment of a feature film about Australian artist and occultist Rosaleen Norton. This project was unrealized.

=== 2000–2023: Return to filmmaking and final years ===
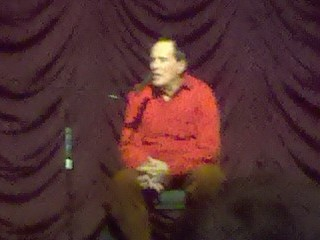
Anger in 2011 speaking at Indiana University.

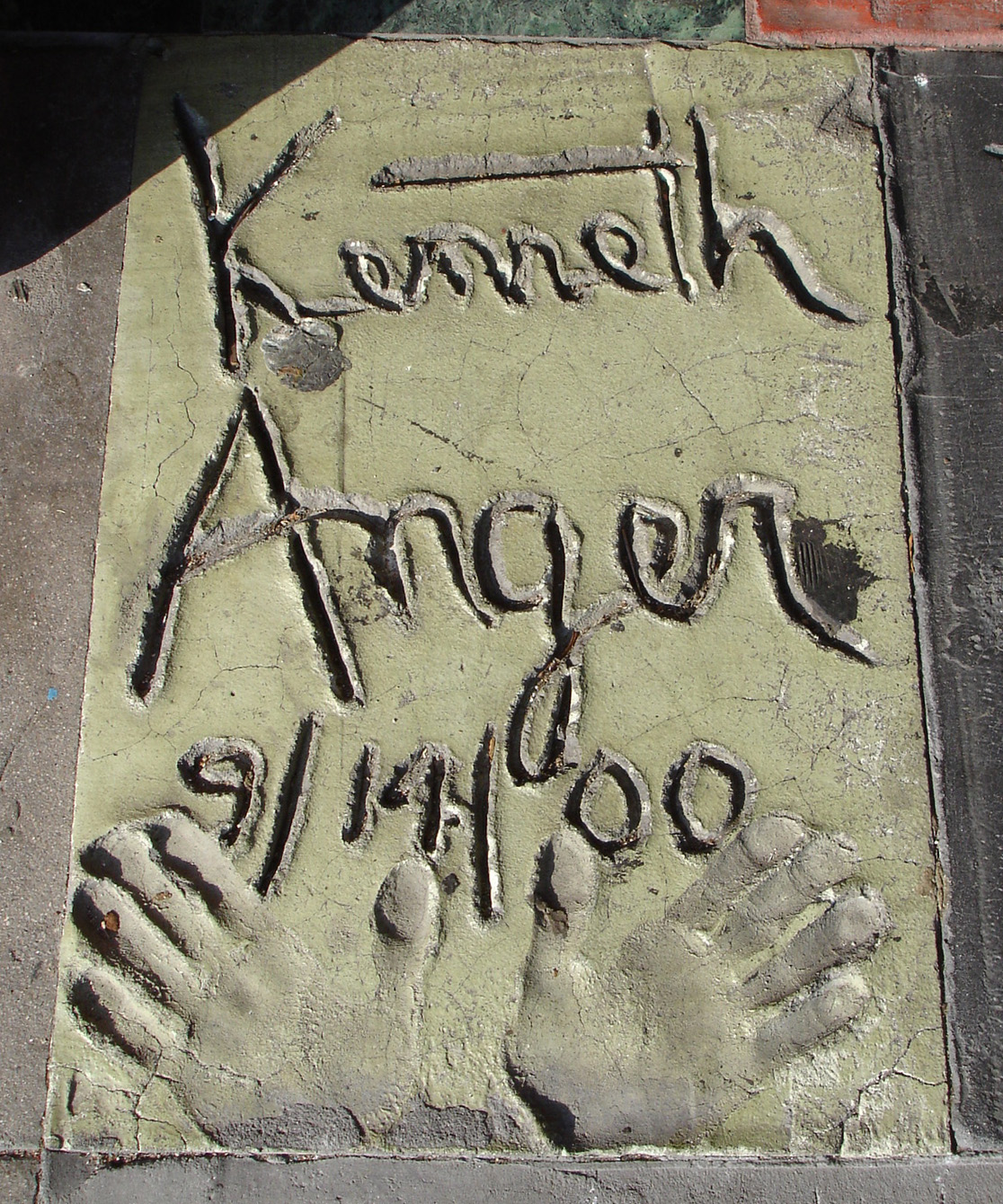
Signature and handprints of Kenneth Anger in front of the Vista Theatre, Los Angeles

In 2000, Anger began screening a new short film, the anti-smoking Don't Smoke That Cigarette, followed a year later by The Man We Want to Hang, which comprised images of Crowley's paintings that had been shown at a temporary exhibition in Bloomsbury, London. In 2004, he began showing Anger Sees Red, a short surrealistic film starring himself, and the same year also began showing another work, Patriotic Penis. Anger soon followed this with a flurry of other shorts, including Mouse Heaven, which consisted of images of Mickey Mouse memorabilia; Ich Will!; and Uniform Attraction, all of which he showed at various public appearances. Anger's final project was Technicolor Skull, with musician Brian Butler, described as a "magick ritual of light and sound in the context of a live performance", in which Anger plays the theremin and Butler plays the guitar and other electronic instruments amid a psychedelic backdrop of colors and skulls.

Anger made an appearance in Nik Sheehan's 2008 feature documentary about Brion Gysin and the Dreamachine, FLicKeR. He also appeared alongside Vincent Gallo in the 2009 short film Night of Pan, written and directed by Brian Butler. In 2009 his work was featured in a retrospective exhibition at the MoMA PS1 in New York City, and the next year a similar exhibition took place in London.

Anger finished writing Hollywood Babylon III but did not publish it, fearing severe legal repercussions if he did. Of this, he said: "The main reason I didn't bring it out was that I had a whole section on Tom Cruise and the Scientologists. I'm not a friend of the Scientologists." Despite withholding legal action against the highly critical 2015 film Going Clear, the Church of Scientology is known to sue those making accusations against it.

In 2019, he became the subject of the documentary short Cinemagician - Conversations with Kenneth Anger, by Swedish author and filmmaker Carl Abrahamsson, which features some of his last recorded interviews.

Anger died at a care facility in Yucca Valley, California, on May 11, 2023, at the age of 96. The announcement of his death was delayed until May 24 while his estate was being settled.

== Themes ==
The logo for an exhibition of Anger's work held in London, 2010.

Several recurring themes can be seen in Anger's cinematic work. One of the most notable is homoeroticism, first seen in Fireworks (1947), which was based on Anger's own homosexual awakening and featured various navy officers flexing their muscles and a white fluid (often thought to symbolize semen) pouring over the protagonist's body. There is similar homoerotic imagery in Scorpio Rising (1963), which stars a muscled, topless, leather-clad biker, and Kustom Kar Kommandos (1965), where a young man sensually polishes a car, with close-up shots of his tight-fitting jeans and crotch. Images of naked men also appear in Invocation of My Demon Brother (1969), where they are eventually filmed wrestling, and Anger Sees Red (2004), in which a muscled, topless man performs press-ups.

Another recurring theme in Anger's films is the occult, particularly the symbolism of his own esoteric religion, Thelema. This is visible in Inauguration of the Pleasure Dome, Invocation of My Demon Brother, and Lucifer Rising, all of which are based on the Thelemite concept of the Aeon of Horus and feature actors portraying pagan gods. Anger linked the creation of film to the occult, particularly the practice of ceremonial magic, something of which Crowley had been a noted practitioner. Anger once said, "making a movie is casting a spell."

One of the central recurring images in Anger's work is flames and light; Fireworks has various examples, including a burning Christmas tree. This relates to Lucifer, a deity to whom Anger devoted one of his films, whose name is Latin for "light bearer".

In many of his films, heavy use is made of music, both classical and pop, to accompany the visual imagery. In Scorpio Rising he makes use of the 1950s/1960s pop songs "Torture" by Kris Jensen, "I Will Follow Him" by Little Peggy March, and "Blue Velvet" by Bobby Vinton. He first used music to accompany visuals in the 1941 work Who Has Been Rocking My Dreamboat?, which uses tracks by the Mills Brothers. His use of popular music to accompany his films has been cited as a key influence on the development of music videos and MTV, although he stated his dislike for the music video industry. On one occasion the band Combustible Edison asked Anger to direct a video to accompany its song "Bluebeard"; he declined, believing that while music could be used to accompany film, it was pointless to do it the other way around.

== Awards ==
- Maya Deren Award, 1996
- Silver Lake Film Festival Spirit of Silver Lake Award (2000)
- San Francisco International Film Festival Golden Gate Persistence of Vision Award (2001)
- Los Angeles Film Critics Association Douglas Edwards Independent/Experimental Film/Video Award (2002), "for his body of work"; tied with Michael Snow, for *Corpus Callosum
- Anthology Film Archives, Life Achievement Award (2010)

== Personality and beliefs ==
If you are a member of the media, you belong to the public. You've made that Faustian bargain with your public. Take me – all of me – I'm yours.

— Kenneth Anger

Anger was known for his reclusive nature and had been called an "extremely private individual", although he gave various interviews over the years, including one with Rocco Castoro of Vice. (Note: Anger actually turned 81 in 2008 but claimed to be younger, as he had repeatedly done throughout his life.) In such interviews, he refused to discuss his name change from Anglemyer to Anger, telling one interviewer: "You're being impertinent. It says 'Anger' on my passport. That's all you need to know. I would stay away from that subject if I were you." But in a 2010 interview, he said: "I just condensed my name. I knew it would be like a label, a logo. It's easy to remember."

Anger once joked that he was "somewhat to the right of the KKK" in his views about black people, opening him up to criticism for racism, though some theorize it was a "Crowley-esque joke". He supported the Tibetan independence movement.

Anger was a Thelemite and belonged to the main Thelemic organization, Ordo Templi Orientis. He viewed many of the men he associated with as living embodiments of Lucifer, a symbol of the Aeon of Horus in Thelemic philosophy, and had his own name inked onto his chest with the Lucifer tattoo. Anger showed an interest in various other religious movements, particularly those that related in some way to occultism. For instance, he was a lifelong friend of Anton LaVey from before the founding of the Church of Satan in the 1960s, even living with him and his family during the 1990s. LaVey also appeared in Anger's Invocation of My Demon Brother as a devilish priest. Anger called himself a pagan and did not consider himself a Satanist. He has called Wicca a "lunar", feminine religion in contrast to Thelema's "solar" masculinity.

== Filmography ==
Date	Title	Length	Notes
1937	Ferdinand the Bull		Lost film
1941–42	Tinsel Tree	3 mins.	A silent black-and-white film that Anger personally hand tinted with gold-scarlet over the flames. It featured a Christmas tree being dressed in decorations, before being shown stripped and bare and set on fire.
1942	Prisoner of Mars	11 mins.	A silent black-and-white film that mixes futuristic science fiction with the ancient Greek myth of the Minotaur. The plot revolves around a character, The Boy Elect from Earth, played by Anger himself, who is sent in a rocket to Mars where he finds himself in a labyrinth filled with the bones of other adolescents sent there in the past.
1943	The Nest	20 mins.	A silent black-and-white film in which a brother (played by Bob Jones) and sister (Jo Whittaker) are examining mirrors when a third figure (Dare Harris), causes them to act violently against one another, before a magical rite takes place in which the sister's binding spell is destroyed by the brother.
1944	Demigods (Escape Episode)	35 mins.	A silent black-and-white film based upon the ancient Greek myth of Andromeda, in which a girl (Marilyn Granas) is imprisoned within a seaside crumbling Neo-Gothic church guarded by a religious fanatic (Nora Watson), till she is saved by a boy representing Perseus (Bob Jones).
1945	Drastic Demise	5 mins.	A silent black-and-white work filmed by Anger in Hollywood on V-J Day. Consisting of footage of a celebratory crowd, it ends with an image of a nuclear mushroom cloud.
1946	Escape Episode	27 mins.	A shortened version of Demigods (Escape Episode), it features Scriabin's The Poem of Ecstasy alongside the sounds of birds, wind and surf.
1947	Fireworks	15 mins.	Filmed in black and white, it is a homoerotic work seen through the eyes of the protagonist, played by Anger himself.
1949	Puce Moment	6 mins.	Filmed in color, starring Yvonne Marquis as a celebrity in her home, and featuring music by Jonathan Halper, Puce Moment lasted only one scene and portrays her examining her dresses and perfume.
1949	The Love That Whirls	unknown	Influenced by James Frazer's anthropological text The Golden Bough, it was set in the Aztec civilisation, and featured a youth who was chosen to be king for a year before being ritually sacrificed. The film was subsequently destroyed at the Eastman-Kodak developing plant, who objected to its theme and nudity.
1950	Rabbit's Moon	16 mins (1971); 7 mins (1979)	Filmed in 35 mm, it is set in a small wooded glade where a clown stares up at the moon, in which a rabbit lives.
1951–52	Les Chants de Maldoror	unknown	Based upon the 1868 novel by Isidore Ducasse, Les Chants de Maldoror, only test shots were produced, in which he employed members of the Marquis de Cuevas ballet.
1953	Eaux d'Artifice	12 mins.	A short, monochromatic film appearing in dark blue, with only one moment of color – a woman opens a fan that glows in bright green. The woman appears in a gown stretching from neck to toe, wearing dark glasses and a feathered headdress. Water flows throughout, from fountains, and suggestively through the mouths and over the faces of statuary. Fluids sensually pulse and flow, reminiscent of sexual climax. In the end the woman steps from a door seemingly from the side of a fountain, and is herself transformed into water. The film is set to the music of Vivaldi's Winter Movement from the Four Seasons.
1953	Le Jeune Homme et la Mort	unknown	Based upon the ballet by Jean Cocteau, this silent black-and-white film starred Jean Babilee as a young man and Nathalie Philipart as Death. It was a 16 mm pilot designed to be used to raise funds to produce a 35 mm Technicolor version, but the funding for this never materialized.
1954	Inauguration of the Pleasure Dome	38 mins.	
1955	Thelema Abbey	10 mins.	A short, black-and-white documentary on Aleister Crowley's Abbey of Thelema in Sicily, which examined many of the exotic frescoes, a study in which Anger was assisted by sexologist Alfred Kinsey.
1961	L'Histoire d'O	20 mins.	Based upon Pauline Réage's 1954 novel, L'Histoire d'O, it revolved around the sado-masochistic sexual activities of a heterosexual couple. Anger would later relate that the money provided for the film had been a part of the ransom paid to the kidnappers of Eric Peugeot, heir to the Peugeot car company fortune.
1963	Scorpio Rising	29 mins.	
1965	Kustom Kar Kommandos	3 mins.	In color, set to the tones of "Dream Lover" by The Paris Sisters, several handsome young men stand admiringly over the chassis of a souped-up hot rod. A young man slowly works the chamois over the chrome and paint of the machine. The young man now smartly dressed in matching pastel blue gets behind the wheel and begins to work the controls. Finally the engine revs and the car rolls away.
1969	Invocation of My Demon Brother	12 mins.	In color, with an electronic score by Rolling Stones lead singer Mick Jagger. The film features an array of occult symbols and activities, including a Satanic funeral for a cat. Demon Brother also includes Anton LaVey as a priest, newsreel footage of the Vietnam War, and clips of The Rolling Stones' July 1969 free concert in London's Hyde Park, their first public appearance after the death of Brian Jones and their first performance with Mick Taylor. Also shown in the concert footage are Jagger's then-girlfriend and pop singer Marianne Faithfull and Keith Richards' wife, actress Anita Pallenberg. Demon Brother is mostly assembled from footage for Anger's original version of Lucifer Rising, including scenes of future Manson Family associate Bobby Beausoleil in the titular role.
1970–1980	Lucifer Rising	29 mins.	
1976	Senators in Bondage		Announced, but never produced
1977	Matelots en Menottes		Announced, but never produced
1979	Denunciation of Stan Brakhage	7 mins.	Announced, but never produced
2000	Don't Smoke That Cigarette!	45 mins.	
2000	Hollywood Babylon	4 mins.	Co-directed with Nico B.
2002	The Man We Want to Hang	12 mins.	Images of artworks by or related to Aleister Crowley with music by Anatol Liadov
2004	Anger Sees Red	4 mins.	Comprises footage of a muscled man, who identifies himself only as "Red", walking through a park and sunbathing, at which he is seen by Anger himself, who is also in the park, before subsequently returning home.
2004	Patriotic Penis		
2005	Mouse Heaven	11 mins.	A montage of rare Mickey Mouse memorabilia, accompanied by a soundtrack of pop songs.
2007	Elliott's Suicide	15 mins.	
2007	I'll Be Watching You	5 mins.	
2007	Green Hell	4 mins.	
2007	My Surfing Lucifer	4 mins.	Using found footage, we are introduced to the short life of Bunker Spreckels, Clark Gable's stepson and surfing legend.
2008	Foreplay	7 mins.	
2008	Ich Will!	35 mins.	
2008	Uniform Attraction	21 mins.	
2009	Brush of Baphomet	1 min.	
2009	Death	42 secs.	Part of the 42 One Dream Rush project, commissioned by 42 Below Vodka.
2010	Missoni	2 mins. 32 secs.	
2013	Airships	9 mins.	

== Books ==
Year	Title	Other
1959	Hollywood Babylon	Anger's most famous work. This book is about the sordid rumors he heard about Hollywood celebrities while living in Los Angeles.
1961	A History of Eroticism	An introduction to Lo Duca's book.
1970	Atlantis: The Lost Continent	An introduction to Aleister Crowley's book.
1984	Hollywood Babylon II	The sequel of Hollywood Babylon. Featuring scandals from after the first book was published.
2001	Suicide in the Entertainment Industry	With David K. Frasier.
20??	Hollywood Babylon III	Written and completed but never published. According to Anger, the book was finished by 2010 but its release was cancelled owing to accusations against actor Tom Cruise and other practitioners of Scientology and that because he criticized Scientology in that chapter, he faced a certain lengthy and costly lawsuit from its official organization, the Church of Scientology, which are notoriously litigious, if it was ever published. Another book, Hollywood Babylon: It's Back!, written by Darwin Porter and Danforth Prince, was published in 2008 and purported to be part III of the Hollywood Babylon series. However, Anger had no involvement with it whatsoever. Indeed, Anger was so upset with this unauthorized work that he used his Thelema magick to curse Porter and Prince.

== See also ==
- List of Thelemites
