= Rabbit's Moon =

1950 film by Kenneth Anger

- Directed by: Kenneth Anger
- Starring: Claude Revenant; André Soubeyran; Nadine Valence
- Release dates: 1971; 1979
- Running time: 16 minutes (1971) / 7 minutes (1979)
- Country: United States

Rabbit's Moon is an avant-garde short film by American filmmaker Kenneth Anger. Filmed in 1950, Rabbit's Moon was not completed (nor did it see release) until 1971.

== Plot ==
Filmed under a blue filter and set within a wooded glade during the night, the plot revolves around a clown, Pierrot, his longing for the Moon (in which lives a rabbit, according to both East Asian folklore and Aztec mythology), and his futile attempts to jump up and catch it. Subsequently, another clown (Harlequin) appears and teases Pierrot, showing him Columbina, with whom he appears to fall in love.

== Cast ==
- Claude Revenant as Harlequin
- Jean Soubeyran as Pierrot
- Nadine Valence as Columbine

== Production ==
The sets were borrowed from French filmmaker Jean-Pierre Melville.

== Music ==
The 1971 version of Rabbit's Moon features a soundtrack consisting of 1950s and '60s pop: "There's a Moon Out Tonight" by The Capris, "Oh, What a Night" by The Dells, "Bye Bye Baby" by Mary Wells, "I Only Have Eyes For You" by The Flamingos and "Tears On My Pillow" by The El Dorados. The 1979 version features only a loop of A Raincoat's "It Came In The Night" as its soundtrack.

== Legacy ==
The film is credited by electronic duo Rabbit in the Moon as the inspiration for their name.

== See also ==
- Commedia dell'arte
- List of avant-garde films of the 1950s
