= Bobby Beausoleil =

American murderer, musician, and painter (born 1947)

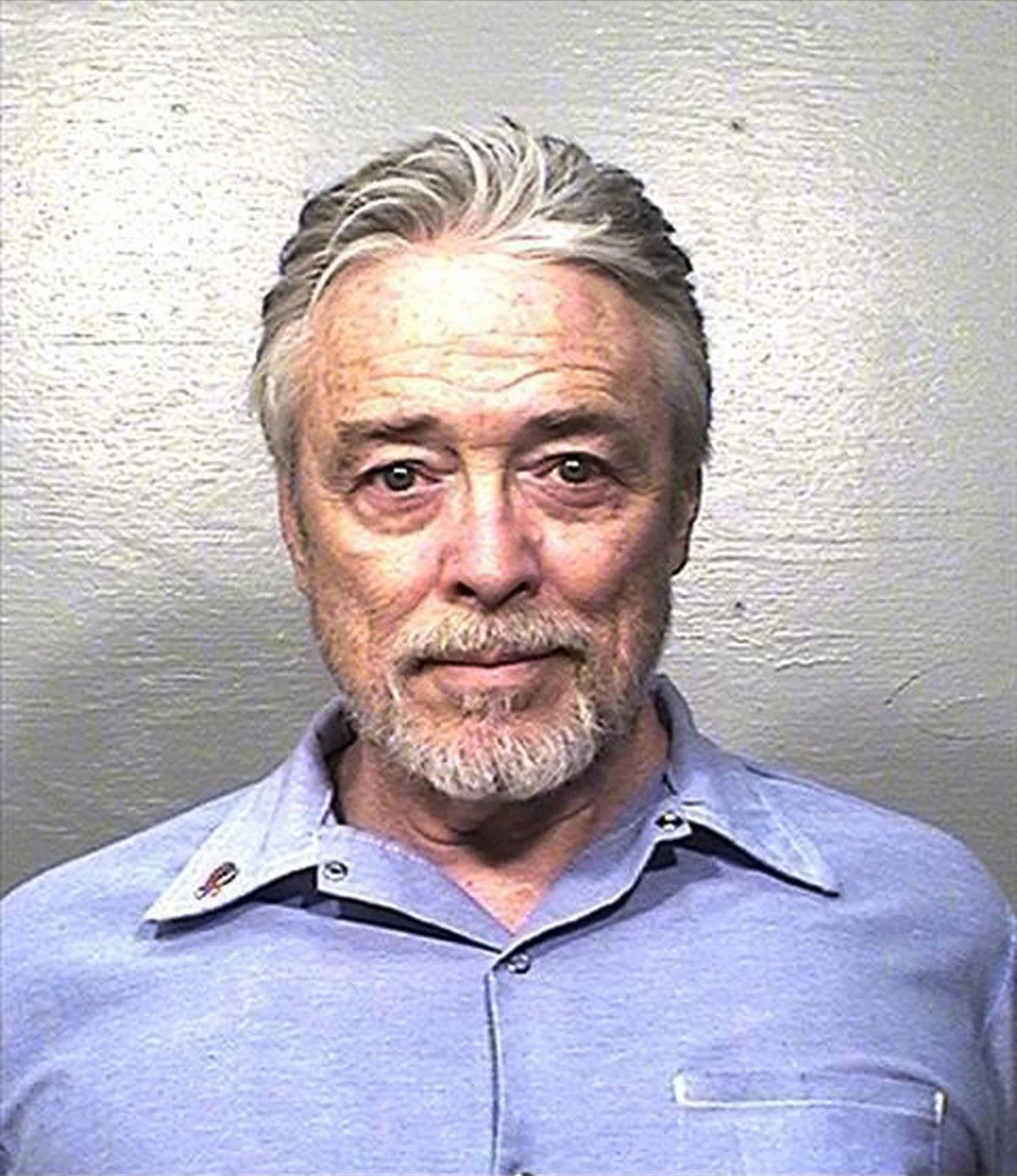
- Mug shot taken on July 1, 2016
- Born: Robert Kenneth Beausoleil; November 6, 1947 (age 79); Santa Barbara, California, U.S.
- Other name: Cupid
- Status: Incarcerated
- Conviction: First degree murder
- Penalty: Death; commuted to life imprisonment

Details
- Date: July 27, 1969
- Killed: 1
- Date apprehended: August 6, 1969

Robert Kenneth Beausoleil (born November 6, 1947) is an American murderer and associate of Charles Manson and members of his communal Manson Family. He was convicted and sentenced to death for the July 27, 1969, fatal stabbing of Gary Hinman, who had befriended him and other Manson associates. Beausoleil was later granted commutation to a lesser sentence of life imprisonment, after the Supreme Court of California issued a ruling that invalidated all death sentences issued in California prior to 1972.

During his incarceration in the California state prison system, Beausoleil has recorded and released music. He has also worked on visual art, instrument design, and media technology. Although a parole board recommended him for parole in January 2019 in his 19th hearing for eligibility, the recommendation was denied by Governor Gavin Newsom.

== Early life ==
Beausoleil was born on November 6, 1947, in Santa Barbara, California, to working-class parents Charles Kenneth Beausoleil and Helen Arlene Mattox. He was the first-born child in a Catholic family and has four siblings. When he was 15, Beausoleil was sent to Los Prietos Boys Camp for ten months for running away from home and a series of juvenile pranks.

After his release, Beausoleil moved to the Los Angeles area and drifted between there and San Francisco, gravitating towards the emerging counterculture music scene and acting. He did brief stints as a guitarist for several rock bands of the era, including The Grass Roots (later to become Love) in 1965 in Los Angeles. Beausoleil then joined The Outfit in San Francisco for several months early in 1966, before founding the free-form psychedelic group The Orkustra alongside David LaFlamme. This lasted until he became involved with underground filmmaker Kenneth Anger in the summer of 1967. He secured a part in Anger's film Lucifer Rising and organized The Magick Powerhouse of Oz band for its soundtrack.

In 1968, Beausoleil was living with Gary Hinman in Topanga Canyon when he met Charles Manson. He became associated with Manson and the communal group known as the "Manson Family".

== Murder of Gary Hinman ==
According to Los Angeles prosecutor Vincent Bugliosi in his book Helter Skelter, Gary Alan Hinman was killed over an issue of money and property that Manson believed Hinman had, and that Manson felt the Family was owed for a Hinman-supplied Beausoleil drug deal gone bad. At Beausoleil's second trial, prosecutors said it had been rumored that Hinman had received a $20,000 inheritance. According to the Los Angeles District Attorney's Office, the slaying became the first in a series of murders committed by the "Family" that set in motion the "Helter Skelter" scenario, which Manson envisioned and preached would happen in the near future in America.

Accompanying Beausoleil that night were Susan Atkins and Mary Brunner. Brunner was granted legal immunity as the key witness for Beausoleil's prosecution. Atkins subsequently became involved in the infamous Tate-LaBianca murders and other crimes perpetrated by Manson and his followers.

Beausoleil went with Atkins and Brunner to Hinman's house in Topanga Canyon, where Beausoleil had lived briefly. They demanded that Hinman give them money, but Hinman said that he did not have any money to give. Beausoleil called Manson at Spahn Ranch and said there was no money. Manson told them to hold Hinman captive at his house and convince him to get the money before Manson arrived.

Bruce Davis drove Manson to the Topanga Canyon home, taking a samurai sword or bayonet. Manson struck Hinman with the sword, severely cutting his face and ear. Some accounts said that he cut off part of Hinman's ear. Beausoleil said he stitched up Hinman's ear with dental floss; other reports say the stitching was done by Atkins and Brunner. Hinman begged for medical attention, but he was held captive at the house and tortured for three days before being killed. Manson told Beausoleil to kill Hinman and to make it look as if the crime had been committed by black revolutionaries, as part of his ideology that a race war was imminent and part of what he called "Helter Skelter". Beausoleil stabbed Hinman to death while Hinman, a devotee of Buddhism, repeated a Buddhist chant. As Hinman lay dying, Beausoleil, Atkins and Brunner took turns smothering him with a pillow.

After killing Hinman, Beausoleil wrote the words "Political piggy" on a wall in Hinman's blood, in an attempt to lead police to believe the murder was done by a group of radicals. He dipped his hand in Hinman's blood and left a paw print, attempting to symbolize The Black Panthers as another way to mislead investigators about Hinman's murder. Beausoleil drove away in Hinman's Fiat. He was arrested on August 6, 1969, after falling asleep in the car, having pulled off the highway at Cuesta Grade, a steep segment of U.S. Route 101 between San Luis Obispo and Atascadero.

In a jailhouse interview twelve years after the murder, Beausoleil asserted that the killing was the result of a drug transaction gone wrong. No reference to a drug deal was made in either of Beausoleil's two trials for the murder or in related books by Ed Sanders and Vincent Bugliosi. According to his 1981 interview published in Oui magazine, Beausoleil first said he had unknowingly supplied members of the Straight Satans Motorcycle Club with a batch of bad mescaline, sold to him by Hinman, and the bikers had demanded their money back. In that interview, he denied that Manson had come to the Hinman residence. Beausoleil said that he had cut Hinman's face himself with a knife during a struggle over a gun. In 1998 he reversed himself about that element of the assault.

Conspirator Susan Atkins stated before her death that she never heard Beausoleil indicate that a drug transaction was related at all to why they went to Hinman's house seeking money from him.

== Conviction, life in prison, and parole hearings ==
On April 18, 1970, a Superior Court jury in Los Angeles found the 22-year-old Beausoleil guilty of first-degree murder of Hinman and sentenced him to death.

Beausoleil's 18-year-old girlfriend, Kathryn "Kitty" Lutesinger, had testified against him during the trial; she was then pregnant by him and later gave birth to a daughter, who would be raised by Lutesinger's parents.

In 1972, following the Supreme Court of California ruling (in the case of People v. Anderson) that the prevailing death penalty statutes were unconstitutional, Beausoleil's sentence was commuted to life imprisonment.

Called as a witness at a 1973 sanity hearing for four other Manson associates, Beausoleil said that he and they would not conform to society's standards of sane behavior. He said,

"I'm at war with everybody in this courtroom. It's nothing personal but the world has been gattling at my brothers and sisters and as long as they are ripping off our world, our friends and our children, you better pray I never get out."

Beausoleil's initial parole suitability hearing was held on August 15, 1978. Prior to 2019, he had a total of 18 suitability hearings; each time the parole board rejected his bid for parole.

Beausoleil attracted some women admirers while in prison. In 1980, he married a 21-year-old fan with whom he had corresponded. Within a year, she sought to annul the marriage, saying he had also been involved with other women.

On April 15, 1982, while incarcerated, Beausoleil was stabbed by other prisoners. After that point he reportedly began to lose his sense of loyalty to Manson and distance himself more from the "Family". He ceased to justify their actions and expressed more regret about what they had done.

In 1994, he requested and was transferred to the Oregon State Penitentiary. His wife, Barbara, whom he had met while in California, moved to Oregon to be near him. Bobby and Barbara had no children together, but she had children from a former marriage. Following the death of his wife and having committed a disciplinary infraction in the Oregon prison, he was transferred back to California in 2015, to the California Medical Facility in Vacaville.

His parole bid was denied in 2016 in part because he was said to have been recording music for sale without permission from the California authorities. Oregon authorities had given him such permission, according to Gary Hinman's cousin Kay Hinman Martley and Sharon Tate's sister Debra Tate. These family members of victims of the Manson murders had been involved in the parole hearings and continued to oppose the release of Beausoleil.

On January 3, 2019, a panel of commissioners of the California Board of Parole recommended that Beausoleil be freed on parole. In recommending parole, the panel cited Beausoleil's youthful offender status as having been a mitigating factor in his crime. They noted that, during his nearly half-century of incarceration, he had pursued creative outlets and pro-social growth, gradually maturing into a person exhibiting compassion and empathy. The Los Angeles District Attorney's office disagreed, saying that the panel's recommendation was "unfortunate".

Kay Martley and Debra Tate also continued to oppose granting parole. Martley stated "this man does not belong outside the walls of prison." Debra Tate repeated the allegation that Beausoleil had been violating prison rules by profiting from the sale of his music and art while in prison. She started a petition on Change.org to ask the governor to deny him parole. Beausoleil's attorney responded to the comment about the music and art activities by saying that "Everything he has produced so far was done with the full permission of the warden of his prior institutions."

As had been the case for several other Manson associates, Governor of California, Gavin Newsom, denied Beausoleil's parole recommendation on April 26, 2019, saying he felt that Beausoleil's release could still pose a danger to society. Six years later, a state parole board panel again recommended on January 7, 2025 that Beausoleil was suitable for a thorough and comprehensive parole review by the Board of Parole Hearings and Gov. Newsom. Governor Newsom reversed Beausoleil's parole recommendation on May 2, 2025.

As of 2023, only two people who have been convicted of murder in the killings committed by the Family have been released from prison: Steve "Clem" Grogan, who was paroled in 1985, and Leslie Van Houten, who was paroled in 2023. Several others, including Manson, Davis and Atkins, have died in prison.

== Private life ==
Beausoleil has three biological children.

== Film roles ==
Beausoleil was to star in Kenneth Anger's 1967 version of the film Lucifer Rising, but little footage was shot before the two had a falling out, and the project was abandoned. Some of the footage was later used in Invocation of My Demon Brother (and again in the resurrected Lucifer Rising film). Beausoleil appeared in the western-styled softcore porn film The Ramrodder (a.k.a. Savage Passion), which also featured his friend Catherine Share. Share later became a full-fledged member of the Manson Family. This film was shot at a small ranch in Topanga Canyon.

Beausoleil at the age of 16 had a brief appearance as Cupid in the 1967 film Mondo Hollywood, a documentary about the social, political, and cultural climate of Los Angeles. It included a wide cast of Hollywood figures, including Manson Family murder victim, hair stylist Jay Sebring.

== Music career ==
In 1965, Beausoleil was for a brief time a member of Arthur Lee's band the Grass Roots. Lee’s band later changed their name to Love to avoid confusion with the San Francisco Bay area group The Grass Roots, but Beausoleil departed before the name change and never recorded with Lee.

By the fall of 1966, Beausoleil had formed a band called The Orkustra. Collaborator violinist David LaFlamme later had success with his band It's a Beautiful Day.

Incarcerated for most of his adult life, Beausoleil has nonetheless produced a significant body of musical recordings, visual art, and writings. Among his most notable works is the soundtrack for Lucifer Rising, an indie-underground film by Kenneth Anger, paired with a prog-rock symphony for a fallen angel's mythical journey. To perform and record his score, Beausoleil assembled a band in prison he called The Freedom Orchestra.

The official Beausoleil soundtrack was originally released on LP by Lethal Records in 1980, the same year the film premiered in New York. A 2004 CD on the Arcanum label also included archival material from The Orkustra and The Magick Powerhouse of Oz. The Lucifer Rising Suite released by The Ajna Offensive in 2009 documents the film's soundtrack project from its beginnings in 1967 to its completion and delivery to the filmmaker in 1979. In addition to the soundtrack, some alternate themes, musical and soundscape experiments, and live performances are included in the boxed set; the anthology box set was released on CD in 2014.

Subsequent additional Beausoleil albums feature compositions often recorded in correlation to and released in conjunction with his drawings and paintings. The 2014 compilation Whispers Through The Black Veil was released on the Wyrd War label, containing the song "The Wailing On Witch Mountain", composed, performed, and recorded in 2012. His most recent musical release is Voodoo Shivaya (2018), a 2-disk concept album recorded between 2008 and 2015. It features both covers and original songs with vocal and instrumental tracks showcasing Beausoleil's instrumental and vocal skills. Guest performances, with the approval of the Oregon State Penitentiary administration, included Annabel Lee Moynihan, Michael Jenkins Moynihan, Robert Ferbrache, and Mike Behrenhausen, all members of the dark folk band Blood Axis. The triple gatefold LP and CD packaging integrates Nicholas Syracuse's photography with calligraphy by Timo Ketola.

== Interviews ==
Truman Capote interviewed Beausoleil in 1972, while the latter was imprisoned in San Quentin State Prison. Capote published the interview in the form of a short story "Then It All Came Down", included in his 1980 book Music for Chameleons. According to his biographers, Capote believed his memory to be infallible and did not keep notes. Following the book's publication, Beausoleil said that Capote took gross literary license in his reporting of the interview from eight years earlier.

== Filmography ==
- 1967: Mondo Hollywood
- 1969: The Ramrodder
- 1969: Invocation of My Demon Brother
- 1972, released 1980: Lucifer Rising, soundtrack composer

== Discography ==
=== Studio albums ===
- 1981: Lucifer Rising (reissued in 2005 and 2016)
- 1997: Running with the White Wolf
- 1998: Mantra: Soundscapes for Meditation
- 2001: Orb
- 2002: 7
- 2009: The Orkustra: Experiments in Electric Orchestra from the San Francisco Psychedelic Underground, 1966-67
- 2013: Dancing Hearts Afire EU LP (reissued on CD in 2016)
- 2014: Orb EU LP
- 2018: Voodoo Shivaya LP and CD

=== Compilations ===
- 2007: Dreamways of the Mystic, Vol. 1
- 2007: Dreamways of the Mystic, Vol. 2
- 2009: The Lucifer Rising Suite (4-LP Boxed Set) Reissued in 2013.
- 2014: The Lucifer Rising Suite CD boxed set

=== Singles ===
- 2002: "Big House Blues"
- 2013: "Red House"
- 2014: "OM's Law"
- 2014: "Angel"
- 2014: "Who Do You Love"
- 2015: "Ghost Highway"
