= Lucifer Rising (film) =

1972 short film by Kenneth Anger

- Title card
- Directed by: Kenneth Anger
- Music by: Bobby Beausoleil
- Release date: 1972 (1980)
- Running time: 29 minutes
- Countries: United States, United Kingdom
- Language: English

Lucifer Rising is a short film by director Kenneth Anger. Although virtually completed in 1972, the film was only widely distributed in 1980, after Bobby Beausoleil delivered the finished soundtrack master.

== History ==
=== Early development: 1966–1967 ===
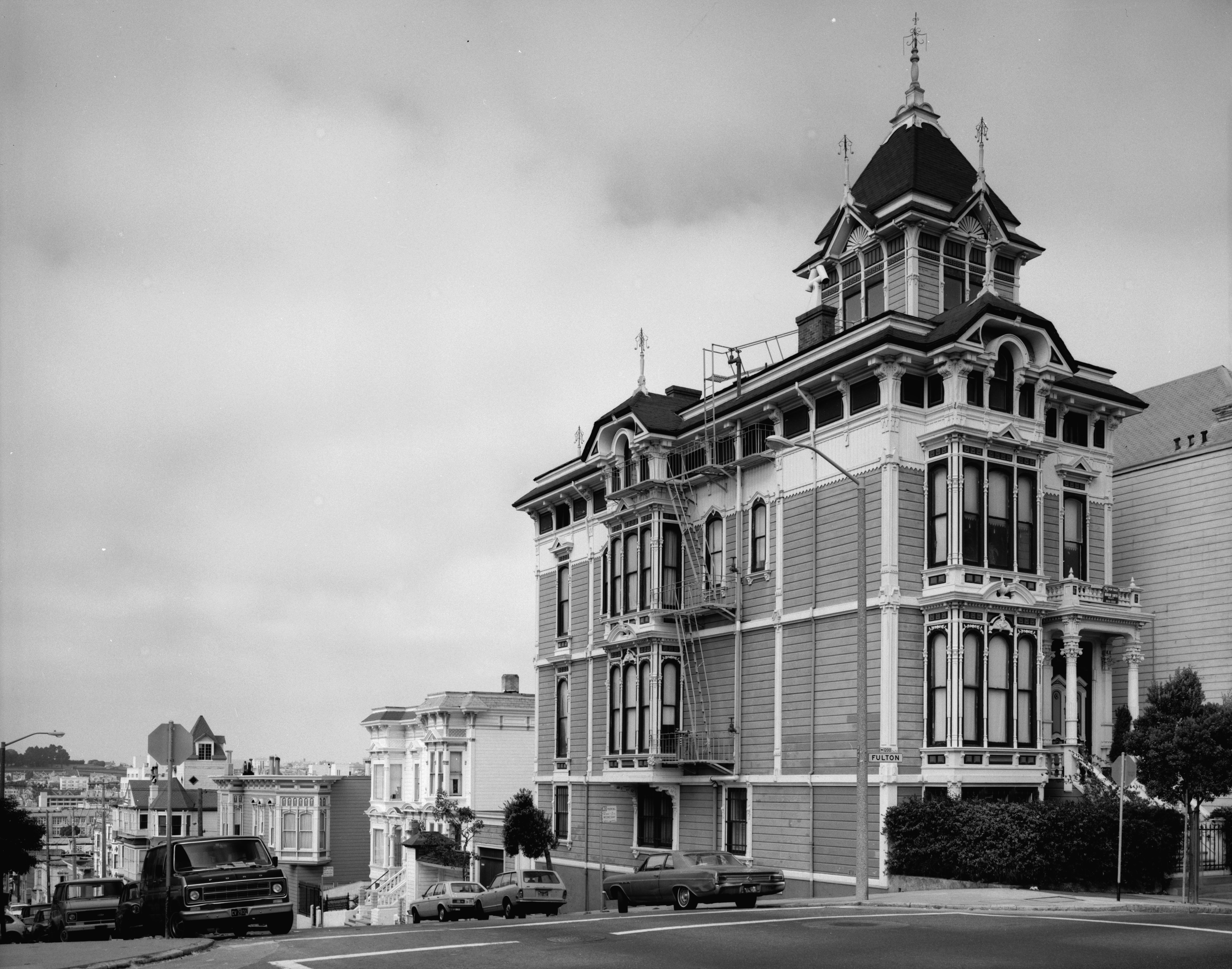
The ornate "Russian Embassy" house in San Francisco, where Anger lived in 1966 and 1967

In mid-1966, Anger began renting a flat on the ground floor of the Westerfeld House, referred to by locals as the Russian Embassy, a dilapidated building located at 1198 Fulton Street in the Alamo Square district of San Francisco. Then in his late thirties, Anger began to plan Lucifer Rising, initially intending for it to document the growing countercultural movement as it existed in California. As Anger stated, he wanted to film "today's new tribe of teenagers, turned-on children – teeny-boppers and adolescent hippies". Anger was influenced by Aleister Crowley's descriptions of Lucifer as the light-bearing god, and was inspired by Crowley's poem "Hymn to Lucifer". According to his biographer Bill Landis, Anger adopted this deity as a "metaphor for the ultimate bad little boy who could corrupt you without coercion". In this context, Lucifer is not the devil but a rebellious mythic hero representing the spirit of the artist.

Anger began to search for a young man who could personify Lucifer for the film, and began to bestow the title of "Lucifer" on any young men who would stay with him at the house for more than a few nights. By late 1966, a young musician named Bobby Beausoleil had moved in with Anger, who had declared him to be his Lucifer. Beausoleil later said that he had first met Anger at the Invisible Circus, an event promoted by The Diggers and The Bay Area Sexual Freedom League at Glide Memorial Church, who had enlisted Beausoleil's band Orkustra to provide musical accompaniment for a troupe of topless belly dancers. Reportedly, Beausoleil was playing his guitar and licking sweat off a woman's breasts when Anger spotted him, later approaching him to offer a part in the film. Beausoleil has disavowed any claims of his having met Anger in Hollywood in 1965, as some have assumed. As Beausoleil later related:

Before we really got into a discussion of what Lucifer Rising was to be about Kenneth showed me his films. I had heard of Scorpio Rising, but I hadn't seen any of his films... The idea for Lucifer was to be the antithesis of Scorpio, which was kind of a death-image type of thing. The concept was that I would be representing the coming of the new age. In a mythological sense, we have come through matriarchy, we have come through the mother goddess. We have come to patriarchy where the goddess is male. And the Aquarian Age is supposed to represent the age of the child. This was the character I was supposed to play.

According to Beausoleil, the agreement that he made with Anger was that, in exchange for his agreement to star in the film, the filmmaker would agree to provide for the young musician's basic needs and would allow him to live at the Embassy, but that he would not be paid for appearing in the film. While staying in Anger's flat, Beausoleil read up on mythology and Thelema from Anger's private library, although he felt that there was tension between them as a result of their different sexualities. Anger was strictly homosexual, while Beausoleil was strictly heterosexual, with the latter opining that Anger "kind of resented the girlfriends I had over, but I wouldn't let that stop me – I was young". Beausoleil served as Anger's chauffeur during this period, and together they attended counter-cultural events such as the Human Be-In at Golden Gate Park in January 1967. During their early conversations, Beausoleil suggested that he could also compose a soundtrack for the film, assembling a band to be known as the Magick Powerhouse of Oz in order to do so, largely out of jazz musicians. Anger agreed to the collaboration.

Anger began filming Lucifer Rising in his typical fragmentary style. Beausoleil expressed frustration, asserting that Anger spent more time talking about the project than actually shooting any film. This early footage starring Beausoleil was instead used in a different film, Invocation of My Demon Brother. One of these scenes featured Anton LaVey, leader of the Church of Satan and founder of the LaVeyan Satanist movement, whom Anger had met through the California occult scene. However, Beausoleil thought LaVey to be "a fuckin' jerk". Anger was aided in the early phases of Lucifer Rising by the filmmaker Richard Patton, who was then residing on the top floor of the Russian Embassy. They developed a friendship, with Patton serving as lighting and camera assistant, later commenting that he learned much about filmmaking from Anger. Anger later noted that he had been frustrated with Beausoleil during the process, stating that "Bobby was fine, except he wanted to dominate. He wanted to direct the film. He was always making too many suggestions." While still in early production, Anger began to produce promotional items for Lucifer Rising, commissioning a poster from Rick Griffin which incorporated an etching by Gustave Doré, Purgatorio, depicting an eagle lifting up a human body wrapped in cloth. To earn money, he continued producing films for private collectors on the side, which were not released for public distribution.

In September 1967, Beausoleil and Anger presented an event titled the Equinox of the Gods to mark the autumnal equinox. The show was to involve the Magick Powerhouse of Oz playing while Anger pantomimed a magical invocation to the new Luciferian age. Anger took LSD before the event; it faced various technical problems and was not deemed a success. Relations between Anger and Beausoleil were increasingly strained, and the latter decided to leave the Embassy, later claiming that he only took his own possessions with him. Anger proceeded to inform the Berkeley Barb underground newspaper that his house had been burgled, and that his camera, props, and footage for Lucifer Rising had been stolen. He subsequently made the claim that Beausoleil was responsible for the theft of the footage. Beausoleil denied the accusation, stating that Anger had spent all the money on frivolous items, that had been invested in the film and that Anger had simply claimed that it was stolen to avoid being punished by his creditors. In October 1967, Anger then posted a full-page advert in the Village Voice declaring his own death with "IN MEMORIAM. KENNETH ANGER. FILMMAKER 1947–1967". In this, he was imitating Crowley, who had faked his own death in order to drum up interest for an art exhibition, although Anger also told friends that it was a stunt to protest the limited finances that were available to independent filmmakers. Anger then furthered this publicity campaign by arriving at the New York City office of the Film-Makers' Collective and burning dozens of his old films, before returning to San Francisco to appear at the funeral for one of the Church of Satan's parishioners.

=== Development and filming: 1968–1972 ===
In 1968, Anger traveled to Britain, where he looked for potential new financiers for his work. In London, he involved himself with the social circle of Robert Fraser and his Indica Gallery in Mayfair, through which he met John Paul Getty Jr., who would become a key patron. It was in this London counter-cultural scene that Anger decided to re-focus Lucifer Rising away from the Californian scene to embrace a more inter-continental approach. It was also in this circle that Anger met rock band The Rolling Stones, becoming friends with lead singer Mick Jagger and guitarist Keith Richards, as well as their respective girlfriends Marianne Faithfull and Anita Pallenberg. Jagger was intrigued by Anger and realized that occultism had the potential to inspire a counterculture movement. Anger tried to convince Jagger to take on the role of Lucifer for the film, something that tempted the musician. Jagger composed music for the film using a newly acquired Moog synthesizer, with Anger later stating that "he was great. He did it for me in one night; we just climbed on the same wavelength." However, Jagger's composition would ultimately be used in Invocation of My Demon Brother rather than Lucifer Rising. He also filmed some footage at a free Rolling Stones concert that was held in Hyde Park, which would subsequently be included in Invocation of My Demon Brother. Anger put together that film using footage produced in San Francisco and London over the previous few years, and in August 1969 it was released on the underground film circuit in the U.S., where it attracted much attention and was screened as a midnight movie at the New York Elgin Theatre.

Still based in London, Anger began to propose a Crowley biopic, although nothing came of it. Still seeking to pursue the Lucifer Rising project, he found a young man named Leslie Huggins to be Lucifer. Although enthusiastic about this new actor, stating that he was "a natural star and absolutely perfect for the part", Huggins soon abandoned the project and Anger. After the disastrous events of the Altamont Free Concert in December 1969, in which a fan brandishing a handgun was killed by Hells Angels, Jagger began to distance himself from Anger. Instead, he offered his brother Chris Jagger for the role of Lucifer, which Anger accepted. The director Donald Cammell was cast in the role of the god Osiris. Anger cast British singer Marianne Faithfull in the role of the goddess Lilith, while her brother Chris was hired as photographer, and the Rolling Stones' personal photographer, Michael Cooper, was also hired to help with the photography. Anger convinced fashion designer Laura Jameson to create the film's costumes and play the role of a priestess in it.

To attract press attention, Anger arranged a photo shoot at his basement flat, in which a number of other film directors were in attendance, among them Cammell himself, Dennis Hopper, and Alejandro Jodorowsky. Anger proceeded to film eight minutes of footage in which he played the role of a magus dancing around a magic circle; he titled this Lucifer Rising, Part I and used it to convince the National Film Finance Corporation to provide him with £15,000 to complete the rest of the film. This action sparked some controversy in the conservative press, with the Sunday Telegraph publishing a March 1971 headline of "Devil Film to Get State Aid". With this monetary backing, Anger flew the cast out to both Exernsteine in Germany and Egypt to get more footage for the film, with The Evening Standard sending a reporter to write an article on their filming in Egypt. On set, Anger repeatedly argued with Chris Jagger, resulting in the latter being fired by the director.

=== Creating a soundtrack: 1972–1980 ===
Back in London, Anger met Jimmy Page of the rock band Led Zeppelin at an auction where they were both bidding for a piece of Crowley memorabilia. Becoming friends, Page invited the filmmaker to stay at his Scottish house on the banks of Loch Ness, Boleskine House, which had once belonged to Crowley. Shortly after, Anger convinced Page to compose the soundtrack for Lucifer Rising, with the rock star also giving Anger permission to move into the basement of his London mansion. Anger publicly revealed that Page was to provide the soundtrack in a February 1972 interview with Variety magazine, in which he erroneously claimed that the film was near completion and announced that Page was involved. Then, in April 1973, he allowed some of the footage for the film to be screened during a public appearance that he made at the State University of New York in Buffalo. However, in October 1976, Anger got into an argument with Page's wife Charlotte, who threw him out of their London home. He was able to collect his belongings later that week, subsequently giving a press conference in which he lambasted both Page and his wife, stating that "I'm beginning to think Jimmy's dried up as a musician. He's got no themes, no inspiration, no melodies to offer."

Learning that Page had been removed from the project, Beausoleil wrote to Anger from Tracy Prison (DVI) in California, suggesting that he compose a soundtrack for Lucifer Rising, as they had originally agreed almost a decade earlier. With aid from a prison teacher, he was able to obtain the necessary musical instruments and recording equipment, and formed the Freedom Orchestra, with Anger visiting Tracy Prison to talk with him about the project. Still enthusiastic about Lucifer Rising, to the press he no longer claimed that Beausoleil had stolen from him, but instead blamed anonymous youths.

Aleister Crowley associate Gerald Yorke is credited as "Thelemic consultant".

Bobby Beausoleil released his 44-minute Lucifer Rising soundtrack on vinyl LP in 1980, on the fly-by-night Canadian label Lethal Records. Many of the 1000 copies of this initial pressing were sold by Anger at theater screenings of his Magick Lantern Cycle, which always ended with Lucifer Rising. In 2005, Beausoleil reissued the soundtrack, with outtakes that included the 1967 version of the soundtrack in a two-disk CD package on the Arcanum label.

The complete anthology of both versions of the soundtrack he recorded with The Magick Powerhouse of OZ, and all of the project recordings was released on vinyl LP as a four-disk boxed set on the Ajna label, The anthology was reissued by Ajna in a CD version of the boxed set in 2004. Beausoleil spoke of his inspiration for composing the score in his liner notes for the boxed set:

When I was originally cast to play Lucifer in '67, my role was described to me as a portrayal of the disobedient angel representing the spirit of love rising to herald the dawn of a new age. When I composed and recorded the soundtrack for a re-conceptualized Lucifer Rising a decade later I drew upon my own life experiences to tell the story in music evocative of the mythical Lucifer awakening from his pit of despair, rekindling his torch, and rising like a phoenix from the ashes of his own unmaking...

In early 2007, the original single-disk vinyl LP of the Lucifer Rising soundtrack was reissued (with a fresh mastering by Robert Ferbrache, and new cover art by the Russian art collective Doping-pong) on the Ajna label.

The original Jimmy Page soundtrack was released in 2012 as Lucifer Rising and Other Sound Tracks. Further music was issued as part of his Sound Tracks box set. Page explained of the latter:

I'm leaving the guitar on it, a 12-string, because that's the guide guitar that's showing me where I'm going to do the overdub. This isn't what got sent to Kenneth Anger, because I didn't want hardly any guitar at all. There's only a little bit of guitar at the end: guitars coming in more across it. But the mix is really, really superb. I'm really proud of it. And I've got some experimental music that was done with bow and Theremin which is like, "Hang on to your seats", because it really, really is something else. It's disturbing. I've got home stuff that I did at the same studio or equipment that I did the Lucifer Rising soundtrack on, with the whole guitar textures and overdubs.

== Cast ==
- Haydn Couts as the magus #1
- Kenneth Anger as the magus #2
- Leslie Huggins as Lucifer
- Bobby Beausoleil as himself (Note: Not in the film—shots were used in Invocation of My Demon Brother)
- Donald Cammell as Osiris
- Marianne Faithfull as Lilith
- Myriam Gibril as Isis
- Chris Jagger as the man in yellow tunic
- Jimmy Page as the man holding the stele of revealing

== Critical assessment ==
The specifically Thelemic associations can make Lucifer Rising initially cold and inaccessible to viewers not versed in such matters, and, admittedly, the narrative is more internalized than any film Anger has made. Yet everyone can appreciate the film as a beautiful work of art in a purely visceral sense.

— Bill Landis, 1995.

Anger biographer Bill Landis described Lucifer Rising as one of the filmmaker's "most popular and enjoyable films". He would further refer to it as "a religious movie ... of the top order", comparing it favourably to the "kitsch" films of that genre such as The Ten Commandments and Mohammad, Messenger of God. He added that the inclusion of the Adept as a character in the film "unlocks the psychodramatic autobiographical element of Anger's moviemaking".

== See also ==
- Hitchcock Estate
