= Invocation of My Demon Brother =

1969 film by Kenneth Anger

- Title card
- Directed by: Kenneth Anger
- Starring: Mick Jagger; Bobby Beausoleil; Anton LaVey
- Cinematography: Kenneth Anger
- Edited by: Kenneth Anger
- Music by: Mick Jagger
- Release date: 1969
- Running time: 11 minutes
- Country: United States
- Language: English

Invocation of My Demon Brother (1969) is an 11-minute film photographed, directed and edited by Kenneth Anger.

== Production ==
Its repetitive noise music soundtrack was composed by Mick Jagger playing a Moog synthesizer. It was filmed in San Francisco at the Straight Theater on Haight Street in Haight-Ashbury and at the William Westerfeld House.

According to Anger, the film, starring Mick Jagger, Manson family member Bobby Beausoleil and Church of Satan founder Anton LaVey, was assembled from scraps of the first version of Lucifer Rising. It includes clips of the cast smoking hashish out of a skull and a Satanic funeral ceremony for a cat.

== Cast ==
- Speed Hacker as wand bearer
- Kenneth Anger as magus
- Lenore Kandel as deaconess
- Bill "Sweet William" Fritsch as deacon
- Van Leuven as acolyte
- Harvey Bialy and Timotha Doane (formerly Bialy) as the brother and sister of the rainbow
- Anton LaVey as his Satanic majesty
- Bobby Beausoleil as Lucifer
- Mick Jagger as himself

== Reception and legacy ==
Invocation of My Demon Brother won the Tenth Annual Film Culture award.

Author Gary Lachman claims that the film "inaugurat[ed] the midnight movie cult at the Elgin Theatre."

== See also ==
- List of American films of 1969
- List of cult films
