= Scorpio Rising (film) =

1963 short film by Kenneth Anger

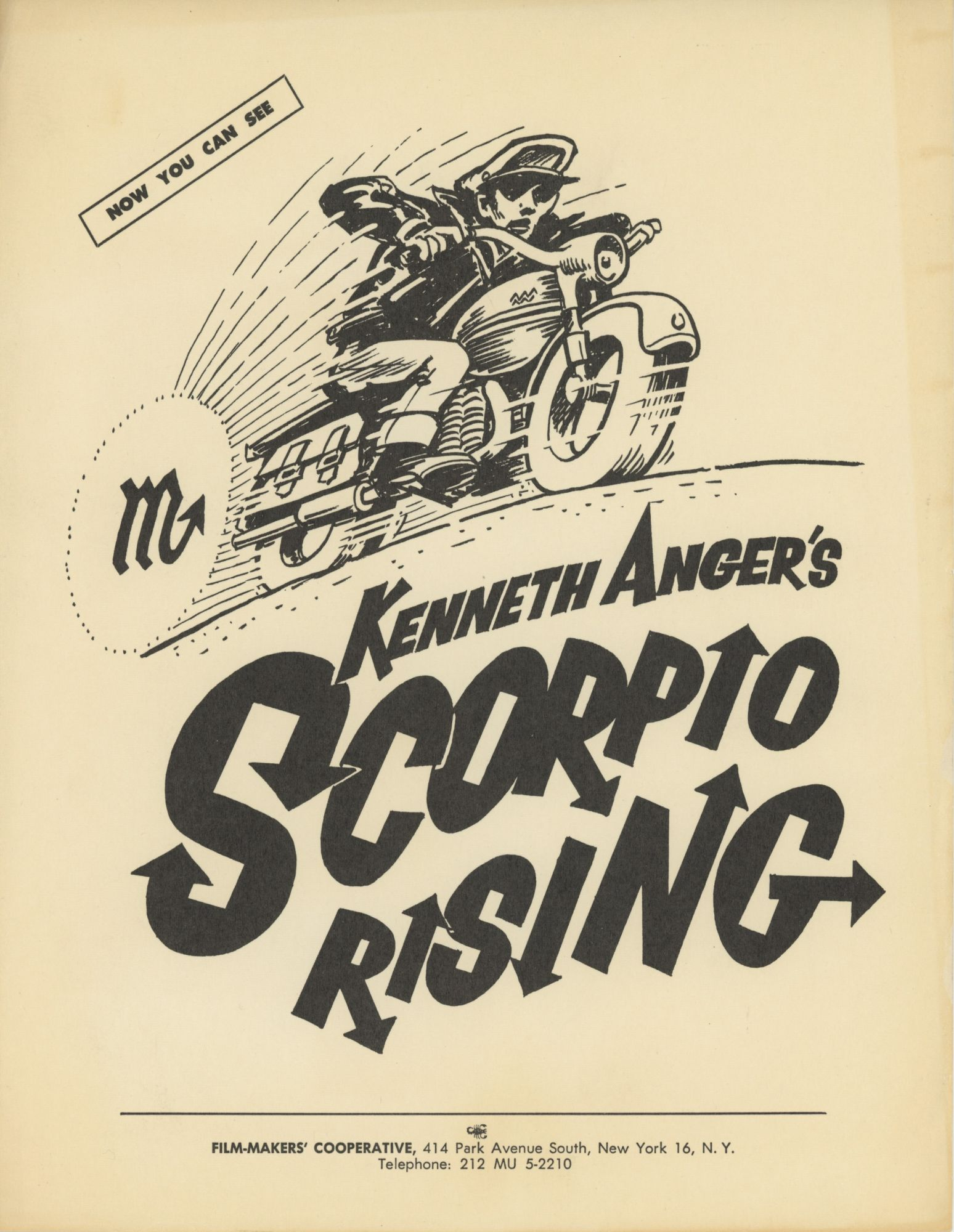
- Flyer promoting a screening of the film, c. 1964
- Directed by: Kenneth Anger
- Written by: Ernest D. Glucksman; Kenneth Anger (uncredited)
- Produced by: Ernest D. Glucksman; Arthur P. Schmidt
- Starring: Bruce Byron
- Cinematography: Kenneth Anger (uncredited)
- Edited by: Kenneth Anger (uncredited)
- Production company: Puck Film Productions
- Release date: October 29, 1963
- Running time: 28 minutes
- Country: United States
- Budget: $10,000

Scorpio Rising is a 1963 American experimental short film shot, edited, co-written and directed by Kenneth Anger, and starring Bruce Byron as Scorpio. Loosely structured around a prominent soundtrack of 1960s pop music, it follows a group of bikers preparing for a night out.

Anger shot most of the film in New York City over the course of three months. His unique style makes extensive use of colorful non-diegetic lighting. Central themes include the occult, biker subculture, homosexuality, Christianity and Nazism. Scorpio Rising also explores the worship of rebel icons of the era, such as James Dean and Marlon Brando (referred to by Anger as Byron's "heroes", likely a direct reference to the trope of the Byronic hero).

The film premiered on October 29, 1963, at the Gramercy Arts Theater in New York City. It became the subject of protests and a lawsuit by the American Nazi Party, an obscenity prosecution overturned by the California Supreme Court, and a copyright lawsuit by the Lutheran Church. Scorpio Rising received praise from film critics and was credited with igniting leather gear and motorcycles as a fad in New York.

The film is recognized as a predecessor to the development of the modern music video and has influenced directors such as Martin Scorsese, John Waters, and Nicolas Winding Refn. In 2022, it was selected for preservation in the United States National Film Registry by the Library of Congress as being "culturally, historically, or aesthetically significant".

== Plot ==
Scorpio Rising is structured in four parts. In "Boys & Bolts" men work on their motorcycles. They dress themselves in leather and pose. "Image Maker" introduces the biker Scorpio. He gets ready to go out, and the film begins intercutting images of Jesus. "Walpurgis Party" shows a biker Sabbath. Their behavior escalates as they moon each other, simulate sodomy, and strip one man's clothes off and cover his genitals in mustard. In the final part "Rebel Rouser", Scorpio holds a destructive ceremony, intercut with images of Jesus, Adolf Hitler, and Nazi iconography. A biker crashes, with the final shot showing the words "Blessed Blessed Oblivion" tattooed on his arm.

== Production ==
=== Casting ===
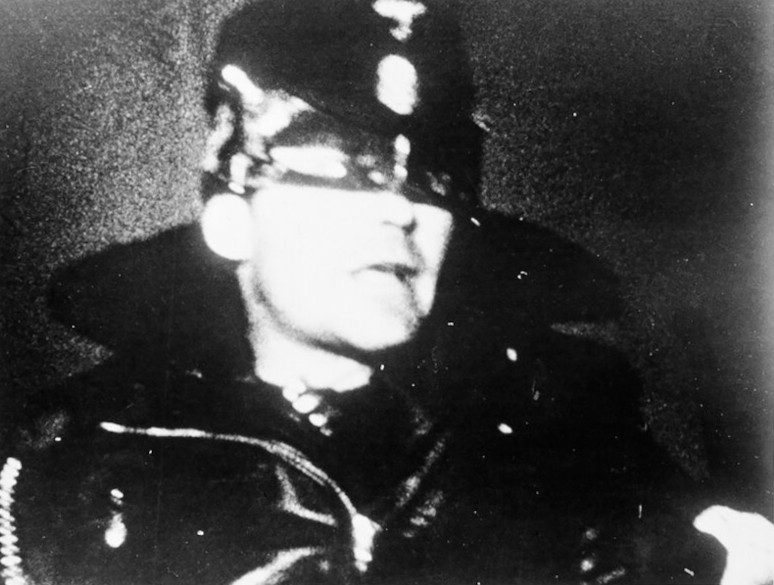
Bruce Byron as Scorpio

After living in Europe for several years, Anger returned to the United States, staying in Brooklyn, New York with Marie Menken and Willard Maas. He encountered a group of bikers who met at Coney Island every weekend. He got to know them by photographing their bikes.

Anger's first choice for the lead actor was Jim Powers; however, Powers died in a car crash. Anger was in Times Square when he first met Richard MacAulay, who went by the name Bruce Byron as an homage to James Byron Dean. Byron also used his astrological sign Scorpio as a nickname, which became the name of the main character.

=== Photography ===
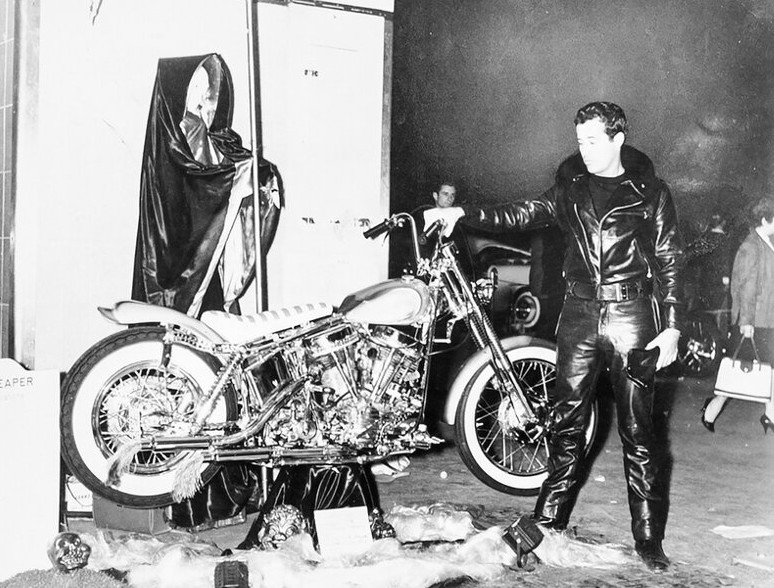
Director Kenneth Anger on set with a motorcycle and a skeleton dressed as the Grim Reaper

Anger spent seven days shooting Byron's scenes. While Byron's wife Rosemary was out of town, they filmed scenes at his apartment in Greenwich Village. He carried around an amulet with a scorpion for good luck. Byron was an ex-Marine. Byron's home was decorated with picture of his idols, James Dean and Marlon Brando. By chance, Brando's appearance in The Wild One was broadcast while they were filming, so Anger shot it off of the television. "His favorite reading material was the comics", and Anger used images from Li'l Abner. Anger shot Byron snorting methamphetamine.

Byron and his wife attended a Halloween party in Brooklyn. Anger bought them four barrels of beer. Anger only filmed the men who attended because they didn't want their girlfriends to be filmed. They initiated a new member by spreading mustard on his genitals. Later that night, they went to an empty, deconsecrated church. The next day, the group went up to a dirt motorcycle track near Walden Pond for their last long-distance race before winter began. According to Anger, a racer died on camera when his motorcycle tipped over and he broke his neck in the crash. However, this claim has never been verified or confirmed.

Anger spent three months in New York filming the bikers. He shot on Ektachrome reversal film. Anger's design makes extensive use of non-diegetic lighting, rendering his subjects in non-natural hues for artistic effect.

In Los Angeles, Anger met a model from Bob Mizer's Athletic Model Guild. He filmed the man in a leather jacket. "This image is a conscious homage to the physique pictorial art of my friend Bob Mizer that had a physique magazine called Physique Pictorial...sort of like, deliberate, self-conscious posing."

=== Post-production ===
Anger edited the film while he was living in Los Angeles. According to him, one day he received a package containing a 16 mm film. He assumed it was for him until he watched it and found that it was an episode of The Living Bible titled "Last Journey to Jerusalem", intended for a Sunday school class at a nearby Lutheran church. He decided to incorporate it into Scorpio Rising, tinting the footage blue. Biographer Bill Landis suggests that Anger more likely purchased the film in a camera store.

In contrast to many of his other films which use dissolves to create a dreamlike mood, Anger relies exclusively on direct cuts in Scorpio Rising. Color became an important device for structuring the film. The dominant color of the film moves from blue to red and ends with green.

Anger described his discovery of Bobby Vinton's "Blue Velvet" as "magick". He had music selected for rest of "Boys & Bolts" but needed a song for the scenes where the bikers dress themselves. He turned on the radio and "exercised his will", and "Blue Velvet" was playing. Anger decided to pay for the rights to the songs so that he could submit Scorpio Rising to film festivals. The clearance cost him $8,000, amounting to roughly half of the film's budget.

== Music ==
Scorpio Rising is considered by some to be the first drama film to feature a rock and roll soundtrack. Anger's use of music was inspired by the experience of seeing people at Coney Island playing music out of their radios.

1. Ricky Nelson – "Fools Rush In (Where Angels Fear to Tread)"
2. Little Peggy March – "Wind-Up Doll"
3. The Angels – "My Boyfriend's Back"
4. Bobby Vinton – "Blue Velvet"
5. Elvis Presley – "(You're the) Devil in Disguise"
6. Ray Charles – "Hit the Road Jack"
7. Martha and the Vandellas – "(Love Is Like a) Heat Wave"
8. The Crystals – "He's a Rebel"
9. Claudine Clark – "Party Lights"
10. Kris Jensen – "Torture"
11. Gene McDaniels – "Point of No Return"
12. Little Peggy March – "I Will Follow Him"
13. The Surfaris – "Wipe Out"

== Release ==
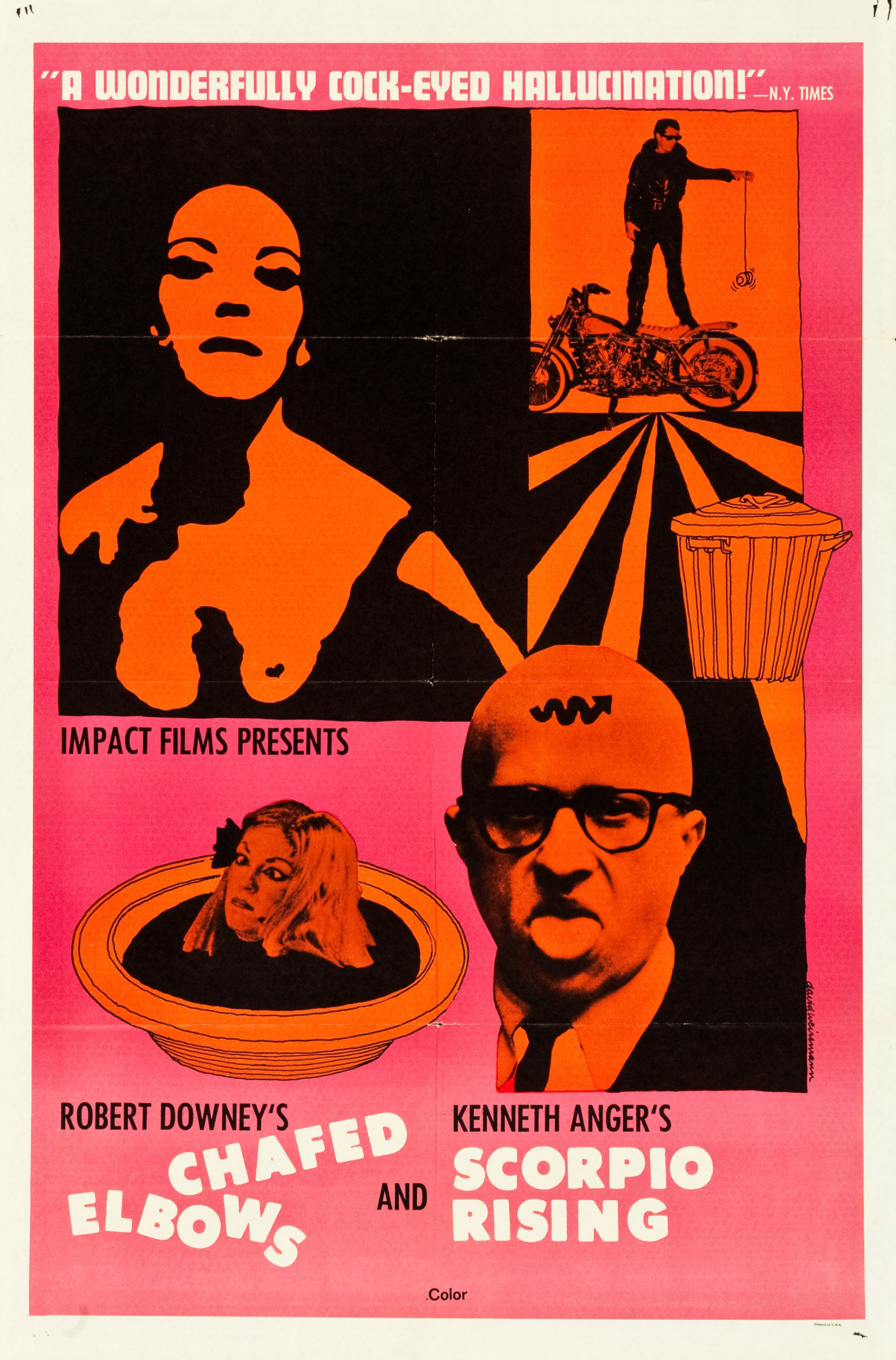
Poster promoting a double-billed screening of Scorpio Rising with Chafed Elbows by Robert Downey Sr., 1966

The film premiered on October 29, 1963, at the Gramercy Arts Theater in New York City. It was screened at the Knokke-Le-Zoute Experimental Film Festival in 1963 and the International West German Short Film Festival in 1964.

When Bleecker Street Cinema in Greenwich Village switched from being a repertory cinema to a first-run theater, its first program was a double bill of Scorpio Rising and The Brig by Jonas Mekas. It continually drew large crowds, with lines around the block. Byron showed up regularly on his Harley-Davidson motorcycle and greeted attendees. Within the rising underground film scene, Scorpio Rising became the most widely distributed movie. Its popularity was credited with igniting leather gear and motorcycles as a fad in New York.

=== Lawsuits ===
When the film was screened at an art theater in Los Angeles, it was protested by the American Nazi Party on the basis that it insulted their flag. The police were ultimately called to the site and arrested the theater manager for public obscenity and canceled the film's run. This happened March 7, 1964 at the Cinema Theater.

Michael Getz was arrested and charged for screening the film. Prosecutor Warren Wolfe argued that Scorpio Rising's homosexual content was a "depiction of certain degenerate activity", and therefore obscene. He asserted that, for a few frames in the part scene, a man's penis was visible. The judge ruled that the film was obscene, and Getz was convicted.

The case was appealed to the California Supreme Court, where the case was settled in Getz's favor. This happened on December 19, 1964. It cost the Cinema Theater $7,000 to defend itself in court. Anger explained in an interview:

When Scorpio Rising was – we've forgotten, in a sense, that it was a groundbreaker, legally…The case had to go to the California Supreme Court to be freed and then it became, like, a landmark case of redeeming social merit. That was the phrase that was used to justify that it wasn't pornography. And, indeed, there's nothing pornographic about it. Somebody had to break the ice and have that kind of case at that time to establish the freedom, because, before then, the police could seize anything they wanted to. What I was doing on the West Coast, Jack Smith was doing on the East Coast with Flaming Creatures. The two films happened at about the same time."

The Nazi Party sued Anger for defamation. The Lutheran Church sued him for copyright infringement, but his use was found to be fair use.

== Critical response ==
Scorpio Rising was praised by West Coast critics upon its initial release. When screened in New York City in 1964, the film garnered additional positive reviews from The New Yorker, Variety and Newsweek. A 1966 review by Brendan Gill called it "a strong and, despite its unpleasant subject matter, beautiful movie".

Nora Sayre of The New York Times reviewed the film in 1975 stating, "Oddly enough, the references to the nineteen-fifties, which seemed dated and rather ponderous in 1965, don't make the film appear old-fashioned now. Admittedly, one then saw it in an unfortunate context – draped in the mystique of the underground, when a number of inferior films employed some similar imagery, such as the juxtaposition of Christ and hipsters, or close-ups of all-purpose skulls. But after a decade's education in put-ons, one can savor the impudent freshness of Scorpio today."

== Legacy ==
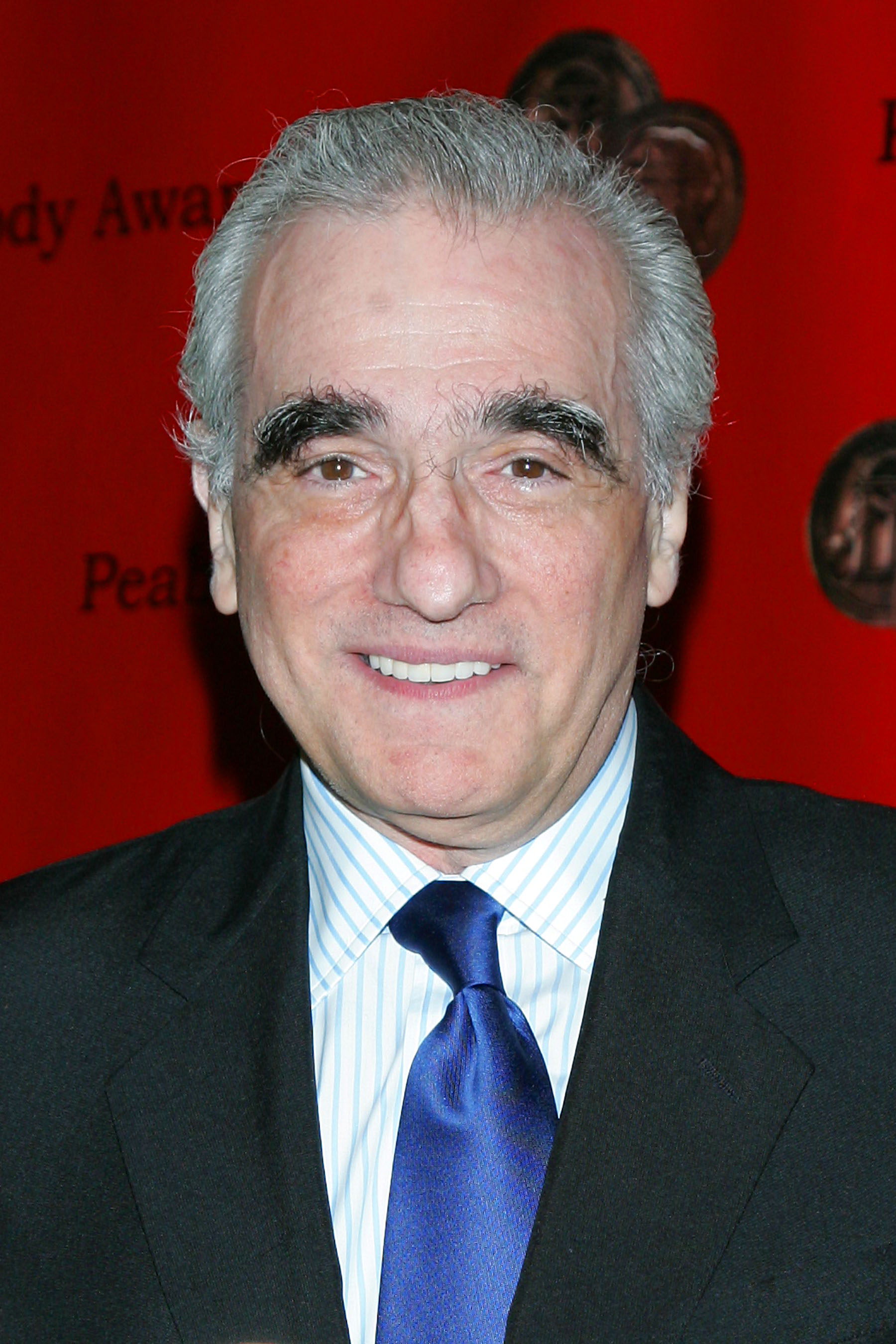
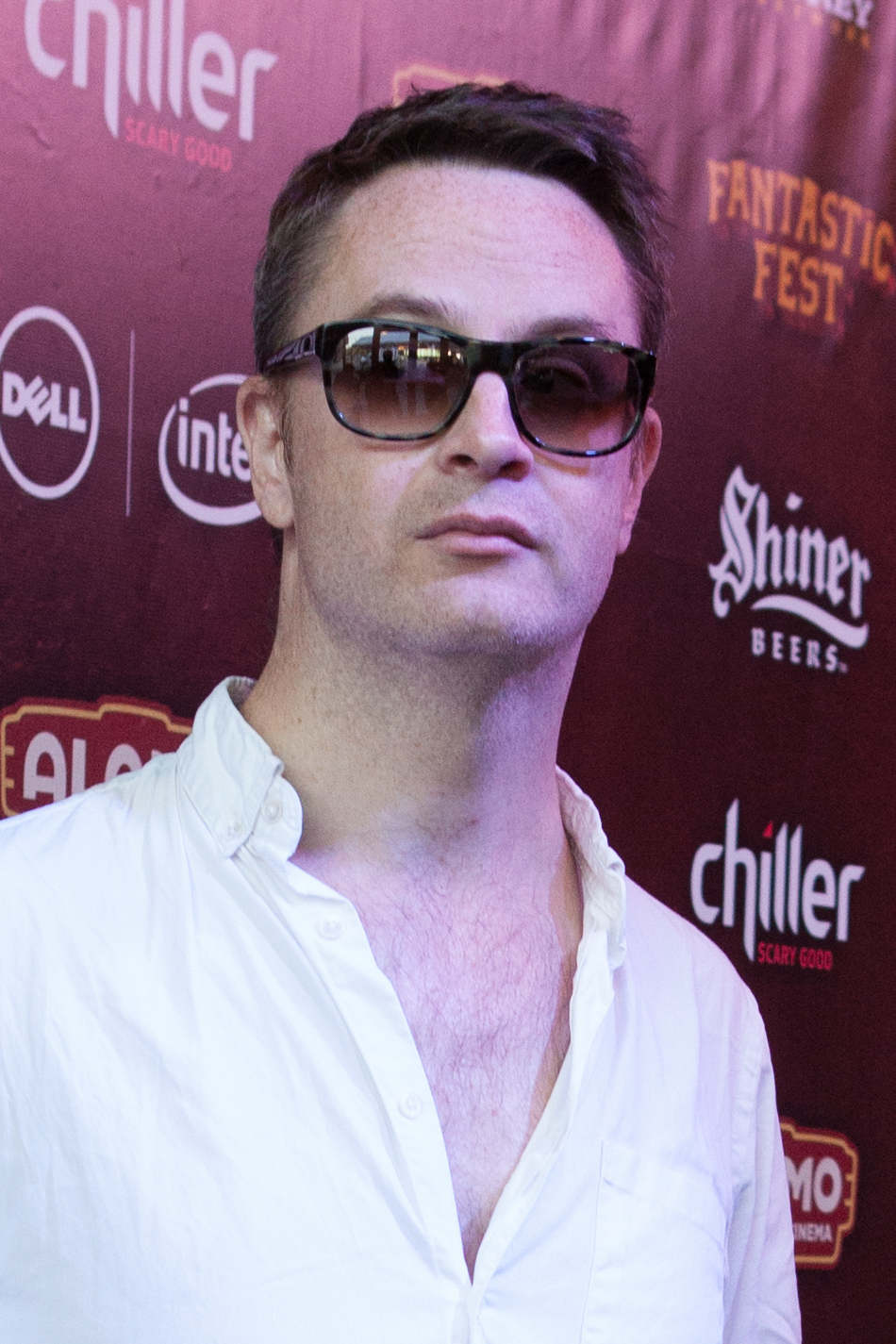
Directors Martin Scorsese and Nicolas Winding Refn have recognized Scorpio Rising as a recurring influence on their work.

Scorpio Rising is now recognized as a predecessor to the development of the music video. Director Martin Scorsese, having seen the film at a screening by Mekas during the mid-1960s, has cited the film as a major influence on his work. He stated that "the way Anger used music in that film, in such perfectly magical harmony with the images, opened my thinking about the role music could play in movies." John Waters has similarly pointed to the use of music in Scorpio Rising as influential. Nicolas Winding Refn identified the film as an inspiration for Bronson and Drive. The title of his 2009 film Valhalla Rising is an homage to Anger's Scorpio Rising and Lucifer Rising.

In the 2012 Sight & Sound poll, the film received votes from five film critics and one director. Scorpio Rising is now part of Anthology Film Archives' Essential Cinema Repertory collection. In 2022, the film was selected for preservation in the United States National Film Registry by the Library of Congress as being "culturally, historically, or aesthetically significant".

At the suggestion of Yukio Mishima, the Art Theatre Guild in Japan named Theatre Scorpio after the film.

The third album by British electronic band Death in Vegas takes its name from the film. The band asked Anger to make an accompanying film, to which he responded, "I haven't even listened to your squalid little dirge." In 2012, British indie pop band Peggy Sue released a cover album with 12 of 14 songs from the film's soundtrack.

== See also ==
- List of American films of 1963
- List of cult films

== Sources ==
- Denisoff, R. Serge; Romanowski, William D. (1991). Risky Business: Rock in Film. Transaction Publishers. ISBN 978-0-88738-843-9.
- James, David E. (1989). Allegories of Cinema: American Film in the Sixties. Princeton University Press. ISBN 978-0-691-04755-3.
- Landis, Bill (1995). Anger: The Unauthorized Biography of Kenneth Anger. HarperCollins Publishers. ISBN 978-0-06-016700-4.
- MacDonald, Scott (2006). A Critical Cinema 5: Interviews with Independent Filmmakers. University of California Press. ISBN 978-0-520-93908-0.
- Sitney, P. Adams (2002). Visionary Film: The American Avant-Garde, 1943–2000. Oxford University Press. ISBN 978-0-19-514886-2.
- Suárez, Juan A. (1996). Bike Boys, Drag Queens, and Superstars: Avant-Garde, Mass Culture, and Gay Identities in the 1960s Underground Cinema. Indiana University Press. ISBN 978-0-253-21033-3.
