= List of avant-garde films of the 1950s =

This is a list of avant-garde and experimental films released in the 1950s. Unless noted, all films had sound and were in black and white.

Title	Director	Cast	Nation	Notes
1950
The Adventures of Jimmy	James Broughton	James Broughton	United States	Music by Weldon Kees.
Un chant d'amour	Jean Genet	Java, André Reybaz	France	Genet's only film as a director
Eaten Horizons	Wilhelm Freddie, Jørgen Roos		France	Surrealist film
Orphée	Jean Cocteau	Jean Marais	France	
Rabbit's Moon	Kenneth Anger	André Soubeyron, Claude Revenant	France	Color
Swain	Gregory Markopoulos, Robert C. Freeman, Jr.	Gregory Markopoulos, Mary Zelles	United States	Based on Hawthorne's novel Fanshawe. Only a drastically shortened version exists; 24 minutes of 50
Tłum (The Crowd)	Walerian Borowczyk		Poland	
1951
Divertissement Rococo	Hy Hirsh		United States	Abstract animation
Ensemble for Somnambulists	Maya Deren		Canada	
Images pour Debussy	Jean Mitry		France	Visualization of music, semi-abstract water film.
Le film est déja commence?	Maurice Lemaître		France	Lettrist film
Le mort du cerf	Dimitri Kirsanoff		France	
A Treatise on Venom and Eternity	Isidore Isou	Isidore Isou	France	Lettrist film
1952
L'anti-concept	Gil J. Wolman		France	Lettrist film
Approaches and Leavetakings	Weldon Kees, Jurgen Ruesch		United States	
Bells of Atlantis	Ian Hugo	Anaïs Nin	United States	Color. Semi-abstract images and electronic music by Bebe and Louis Barron accompany a reading by Nin from her 1936 novella House of Incest.
Form Phases I	Robert Breer		United States	Color, silent abstract animation.
Hand-Mouth Coordination	Weldon Kees, Gregory Bateson		United States	
Hotel Apex	Weldon Kees		United States	Study of the demolition of an old hotel
Hurlements en faveur de Sade	Guy Debord		France	Lettrist film
Interim	Stan Brakhage		United States	Brakhage's first film, scored by James Tenney
1953
The Boy and the Sea	Stan Brakhage		United States	Silent, listed by Camper as "not available"
Color Cry	Len Lye		United States	Color, Drawn-on-film animation, music by Sonny Terry
Come Closer	Hy Hirsh		United States	Color, abstract animation in 3-D
Eaux d'Artifice	Kenneth Anger	Carmilla Salvatorelli	Italy	Color, added to the National Film Registry in 1993
The End	Christopher Maclaine		United States	Early Beat generation film
Eneri	Hy Hirsh		United States	Abstract animation, color.
Form Phases II	Robert Breer		United States	Color, silent abstract animation.
Mandala	Jordan Belson		United States	Abstract animation, color
The Pleasure Garden	James Broughton	Lindsay Anderson, Hattie Jacques, John Le Mesurier	United Kingdom	
Statues Also Die	Chris Marker, Alain Resnais		France	
Unglassed Windows Cast a Terrible Reflection	Stan Brakhage		United States	Silent, listed by Camper as "not available"
1954
Desistfilm	Stan Brakhage		United States	
The Extraordinary Child	Stan Brakhage		United States	Listed by Camper as "not available"
Form Phases IV	Robert Breer		United States	Color, silent abstract animation.
Gyromorphosis	Hy Hirsh		Netherlands	Abstract animation
Inauguration of the Pleasure Dome	Kenneth Anger	Samson de Brier, Anaïs Nin	United States	Color, edited into at least three distinct versions
Un Miracle	Robert Breer, Pontus Hultén		United States	Color, collage animation.
The Way to Shadow Garden	Stan Brakhage		United States	
1955
Atelier de Fernand Léger	Walerian Borowczyk		Poland	Filmed at Fernand Léger's studio in Paris
Aviary	Joseph Cornell		United States	Silent
The Bridge	William Heick	Weldon Kees	United States	Poetic study, based on Hart Crane
Closed Vision	Marc'O.		France	Lettrist film
Dementia, aka Daughter of Horror	John Parker	Adrienne Barrett, Bruno VeSota	United States	Essentially silent psychological horror film, music by George Antheil
Une femme coquette	Jean-Luc Godard	Maria Lysandre, Roland Tolma	France	
Haitian Film Footage	Maya Deren		Haiti	Begun in 1947; later posthumously edited into The Divine Horsemen
In Between	Stan Brakhage		United States	Color, music by John Cage
Jesień (Autumn)	Walerian Borowczyk		Poland	Animation
Joanne, Union Square	Joseph Cornell		United States	Silent
Joanne, Xmas	Joseph Cornell		United States	Silent
Mosaik im Vertrauen (Mosaic in Confidence)	Peter Kubelka		Austria	Written by Ferry Radax
A Portrait of Ga	Margaret Tait		United Kingdom	
Orchard Street	Ken Jacobs		United States	Color, silent
Reflections	Madeline Tourtelot		United States	Color, two distinct versions
Reflections on Black	Stan Brakhage		United States	
Sunday in Peking	Chris Marker		France	
Untitled film of Geoffrey Holder’s Wedding	Stan Brakhage, Larry Jordan		United States	
The Very Eye of Night	Maya Deren		United States	Dance film, choreographed by Antony Tudor
The Wonder Ring	Stan Brakhage		United States	Color, silent
Żywe fotografie (Photographies Vivantes)	Walerian Borowczyk		Poland	Animation
1956
Centuries of June	Stan Brakhage, Joseph Cornell		United States	Color, silent
Flesh of Morning	Stan Brakhage		United States	Revised in 1986
Little Cobra Dance	Ken Jacobs	Jack Smith	United States	
Nightcats	Stan Brakhage		United States	Color, silent
Recreation	Robert Breer	Noël Burch	United States	Color, semi-abstract animation with narration.
Saturday Afternoon Blood Sacrifice	Ken Jacobs	Jack Smith	United States	
Together	Lorenza Mazzetti, Denis Horne	Eduardo Paolozzi, Michael Andrews	United Kingdom	Experimental semi-documentary
Zone Moment	Stan Brakhage		United States	Color, silent
1957
8 x 8: A Chess Sonata in 8 Movements	Jean Cocteau, Marcel Duchamp, Hans Richter		United States	
A to Z	Michael Snow		Canada	"Blue and white" color, silent
Adebar	Peter Kubelka		Austria	Early structural — or in Kubelka's terms, "metric" — film
Adventures of *	John Hubley, Faith Hubley		United States	Color, music score by Benny Carter. Semi-abstract animation.
Angel	Joseph Cornell		United States	Color
Był sobie raz (Once Upon a Time)	Jan Lenica, Walerian Borowczyk		Poland	Cut-out animation
Boy's Games	Joseph Cornell		United States	Silent
Cappuccino	Joseph Cornell		United States	
Children	Joseph Cornell		United States	Silent
Cloche a Travers les Feuilles/Claude Debussy	Joseph Cornell		United States	Revised version of Nymphlight
Daybreak and Whiteye	Stan Brakhage		United States	
Dni Oświaty (Education Days)	Jan Lenica, Walerian Borowczyk		Poland	Animation
A Fable for Fountains	Joseph Cornell, Rudolph Buckhardt		United States	Begun in 1955; revised as "A Legend for Fountains" in 1965
Glimpse of the Garden	Marie Menken		United States	Selected for addition to the National Film Registry in 2007
Nagrodzone uczucia (Requited Sentiments)	Jan Lenica, Walerian Borowczyk		Poland	Animation
Jamestown Baloos	Robert Breer		United States	Color, semi-abstract combination of animation and live action.
Loving	Stan Brakhage	Carolee Schneemann, James Tenney	United States	Color, silent
Strep-tease (Striptease)	Jan Lenica, Walerian Borowczyk		Poland	Animation
A Man and His Dog Out for Air	Robert Breer		United States	Abstract animation, shown with Last Year at Marienbad in its first New York run.
The Man Who Invented Gold	Christopher Maclaine		United States	Partly filmed by Jordan Belson
Nymphlight	Joseph Cornell		United States	Color
1958
Anticipation of the Night	Stan Brakhage		United States	
Beat	Christopher Maclaine		United States	
Broadway by Light	William Klein		France, United States	
Défense d'afficher	Hy Hirsh		France	Color
Dom (House)	Jan Lenica, Walerian Borowczyk		Poland	Animation; Winner of 1958 Belgium International Experimental Film Competition
Free Radicals	Len Lye		United States/New Zealand	
Une histoire d'eau	Jean-Luc Godard, François Truffaut	Caroline Dim, Jean-Claude Brialy	France	Semi-improvised, proto-Nouvelle vague short
A Movie	Bruce Conner		United States	Iconic collage film.
Schwechater	Peter Kubelka		Austria	"Metric" beer commercial
Szkoła (School)	Jan Lenica, Walerian Borowczyk		Poland	Animated photographs
Spatiodynamisme	Tinto Brass, Nicolas Schöffer		France	Color, silent. A visual document of Schöffer's CYSP-1, the first cybernetic sculpture.
Sztandar młodych (Banner of Youth)	Jan Lenica, Walerian Borowczyk		Poland	Animation
The Very Eye of Night	Maya Deren		United States	
1959
Les astronautes	Walerian Borowczyk, Chris Marker		France	Animated
Chasse des Touches	Hy Hirsh		France	Abstract animation
Cat's Cradle	Stan Brakhage		United States	Color, silent
The Diary of an Unknown Soldier	Peter Watkins		United Kingdom	
Eyewash	Robert Breer		United States	Color, silent mixture of abstract animation and live action; exists in two versions.
Hiroshima mon amour	Alain Resnais	Eiji Okada, Emmanuelle Riva	France	Written by Marguerite Duras
Monsieur Tête	Jan Lenica		France	Animation
Odds and Ends	Jane Conger Shimane Belson		United States	
Pull My Daisy	Robert Frank, Alfred Leslie	Allen Ginsberg, Gregory Corso	United States	Beat Generation film, written by Jack Kerouac
The Running Jumping & Standing Still Film	Richard Lester		United Kingdom	
Scotch Hop	Christopher Maclaine		United States	
Season of Strangers	Maya Deren		United States	Unfinished; made as part of Haiku Film Project at Woodstock
Shadows	John Cassavetes	Ben Carruthers, Lelia Goldoni, Hugh Hurd	United States	
Sirius Remembered	Stan Brakhage		United States	Color, silent
Wedlock House: An Intercourse	Stan Brakhage		United States	Silent
Window Water Baby Moving	Stan Brakhage		United States	Color, silent
