= 2003 New York Underground Film Festival =

These are the films shown at the 10th New York Underground Film Festival, held from March 5–11, 2003.

Film Name	Director	Type	Length (minutes)	Notes
#23.3, Book of Mirrors	Joost Rekveld	Experimental 35mm	12	
.airE	Maia Gusberti	Experimental Video	5	
3 Point Perspective	Rebekah Rutkoff	Experimental Video	1	
36	Norbert Pfaffenbichler, Lotte Schreiber	Experimental Video	2	
3D Trick Pony	Ben Coonley	Experimental Video	5	
A.W.O.L.	Robert Banks	Experimental 35mm	3	
Ablution	Eric Patrick	Experimental 16mm	12	
After Wegman	Anne Mcguire	Experimental Video	3	
American Dreams #3	Moira Tierney	Experimental 16mm	5	
American Pork	Seth Grossman, Judd Frankel	Documentary Video	15	
Amy Goodrow: Tape 5925	Eileen Maxson	Experimental Video	6	
An Alchemical Christmas	Thad Povey, The Scratch Film Junkies	Experimental 16mm	6	
An Injury to One	Travis Wilkerson	Documentary 16mm	53	
Asbury	Rick Charnoski, Coan "Buddy" Nichols	Documentary Super-8 On Video	4	
Become the Sky	Laura Dunn	Documentary Video	60	New York Premiere
Between Resistance & Community: The Long Island Do-It-Yourself Punk Scene	Joe Carroll, Ben Hotlzman	Documentary Video	44	
Big Bug Attack	Martha Colburn	Animation 16mm	3	
Buff...'n Muffin	John Davis	Experimental Video	3	
Bullitt Remix	J.X. Williams	Experimental Video	2	
Camera	Kerstin Cmelka	Experimental 16mm	9	
Cat Power at Warsaw	Jem Cohen	Documentary 16mm On Video	5	
Cats Amore	Martha Colburn	Animation 16mm	3	
Chicken Hawk: Men Who Love Boys	Adi Sideman	Documentary 16mm	60	
Christmas 1990	Jenny Stark	Experimental Video	2	
Composition in Red & Yellow	Roger Beebe	Animation Super-8 On Video	2	
Computer Smarts	Animal Charm	Experimental Video	15	
Construct	Daniel Gahr	Experimental 16mm	4	
Cooper/Bridges Fight	Christina Battle	Experimental 16mm	3	
Cortlandt Alley	Laura Kraning	Documentary Video	19	
Cry Baby	Sean Reynard	Short Video	1	
Cubica	M.Ash	Experimental Video	4	
Dacari and Danelli's Demo Tape	Jonnie Ross	Experimental Super-8 On Video	4	
Dark Funeral: A Black Metal Documentary	David Frazier, Sean Scanlan	Documentary Video	17	
Desperate-Not Desperate	Susanne Oberbeck	Short 16mm On Video	10	
Did You Hear Something?	Jenny Stark	Experimental Video	4	
Disquiet	K8 Hardy	Experimental Super-8 On Video	11	
Domestica	Zakery Weiss	Experimental Video	18	
Don't Need You	Kerri Koch	Documentary Video	40	
Double Your Pleasure	M.M. Serra	Experimental 16mm	3	
Earthquake	James Brett	Short 35mm	1	
Estranged	Todd Downing	Short 35mm	14	
Families	James Fotopoulos	Feature 16mm	97	New York Premiere
Flight	James Fotopoulos	Experimental 16mm	3	
Fluff	Todd Verow	Experimental Video	2	
Gentle Jesus and Drugs	Fernando Mole	Documentary 16mm On Video	5	
Gentle-Man	Sean Reynard	Short Video	5	
God Hates America	Jon Nothin'	Documentary Video	5	
Hand Eye Coordination	Naomi Uman	Experimental 16mm	10	
Happy Peppy Sparky Doggy	Robert Todd	Experimental 16mm	2	
Helleskellevision	Martha Colburn	Animation 16mm	10	
High School Reunion	Sarah Jacobson	Documentary Video	16	
Hitler's Hat	Jeff Krulik	Documentary Video	50	
Hot and Bothered: Feminist Pornography	Becky Goldberg	Documentary Video	37	
How Do I Feel About That?	Anthony Disalvo	Short Video	2	
Hunter Dawson	Andrew Dickson	Short Video	10	
Hymn	James Fotopoulos	Experimental Video	90	New York Premiere
I Love You	Haruko Tanaka	Experimental 16mm	2	
I'd Known All Along Exactly What was Going to Happen	Jenny Stark	Experimental Video	5	
Ich Bin Eine Manipulator	Andrew Jeffrey Wright, Clare Rojas	Animation 16mm On Video	4	
In Order Not To Be Here	Deborah Stratman	Experimental 16mm	33	
Infomercial Aesthetics	Daniel Martinico	Experimental Video	4	
Inga	Joe Sarno	Feature 16mm	84	
Joseph & Julia	Kitao Sakurai	Short 35mm	10	
Just Like Golf	E.S. Wochensky	Documentary Video	26	
Kandy Mansion	Lawrence Klein, Joe Pasciascia	Documentary Video	8	
Key West	Thomas Aigelsreiter	Experimental Video	5	
Kinetic Sandwich	Eric Dyer	Experimental Video	3	
Kitchen Sink Opera	Sean Reynard	Short Video	1	
Lick	Hillerbrand+Magsamen	Experimental Video	1	
Liminal Lumen	Luis Recoder	Experimental 16mm	90	
Magnetic Fields Forever	Robert Beck Memorial Cinema	Experimental 16mm		
Mam	Sean Reynard	Short Video	1	
Mark Set Burn	Christine Khalafian	Experimental 16mm	8	
Me Ewid Fella	Sean Reynard	Short Video	1	
Meeting Strangers: Red Light, Green Light	Bill Brose	Animation 16mm	20	
Milk	Sean Reynard	Short Video	6	
Misty	Joe Sarno	Feature 35mm	104	
Moving Back From the Beyond	Paul Tarragó	Short Super-8 On Video	14	
My Kingdom for a Lullaby #4	Michaela Grill, Billy Roisz	Experimental Video	12	
National Archive V.1	Travis Wilkerson	Documentary 16mm On Video	15	
Noble Sacrifice	Vatche Boulghourjian	Documentary Video	40	
Northwest	Rick Charnoski, Coan "Buddy" Nichols	Documentary Super-8 On Video	45	World Premiere
Outline	Sandra Gibson	Experimental 35mm	5	
P.I.F.	Sean Reynard	Animation Video	3	
Perfect Spot	Jennet Thomas	Short Video	14	
Pink Socks	Leighton Pierce	Experimental Video	4	
Pornographic Apathetic	T. Arthur Cottam	Experimental Video	5	
Powwow	Kristin Pepe	Experimental 16mm	7	
Psyche Out 2K3	Beige, Seth Price Collective	Experimental Video		
quadro	Lotte Schreiber	Experimental Video	10	
R.B.'s Eastern Journey	R.B. Umali	Documentary Video	6	
Raised Ranch Complexus	Peggy Awesh, Bobby Abate	Experimental Super-8 On Video	65	
Recc Center	Jay Maldonado	Documentary Video	3	
Scotch Hop	Christopher Maclaine	Experimental 16mm	5	
Scumrock	Jon Moritsugu	Feature Video	79	New York Premiere
Security Anthem	Kent Lambert	Experimental Video	3	
Self Portrait Post Mortem	Louise Bourque	Experimental 35mm	2	
Sideshow	Edie Faig	Animation 35mm	9	
Snow White Wakes Up in Wonderland	Tracey Mcguirl	Experimental Video	14	
Soul Circus	Dylan Griffin	Documentary Super-8 On Video	6	
Springtime for Eva	Russ Forster	Experimental Video	4	
Sundog Verga Matrix	Simon Tarr	Experimental 16mm	4	
Take the Bus	Michaela Schwentner	Experimental Video	4	
Terra Incognita	Ben Russell	Experimental 16mm	10	
The Carpenters	Sean Reynard	Short Video	8	
The Cucumber Incident	Melodie Calvert, Bonita Makuch	Documentary Video	68	
The Dear Hunt	Gritt Uldall-Jessen	Experimental Video	9	
The End	Christopher Maclaine	Experimental 16mm	34	
The Horribly Stupid Stunt (Which Has Resulted in His Untimely Death)	The Yes Men	Documentary Video	45	
The Last News	Reynold Reynolds, Christophe Draeger	Experimental Video	13	
The Magic Kingdom	Jim Trainor	Short 16mm	7	
The Planets	Francesca Talenti	Animation 35mm	6	
The Price of Getting Up	John Carluccio	Documentary Video	12	
the quarry	Ben Russell	Experimental 16mm	4	
The Sand Pit	Jay Magher	Documentary Video	5	
The Scythe	James Fotopoulos	Experimental 16mm	2	
The Sex Cycle	Joe Sarno	Feature 35mm	72	
The Silence of Green	Andreas Horvath	Documentary Super-8 On Video	48	North American Premiere
The Stairway at St. Paul's	Jereon Offermann	Experimental Video	9	
the Unamerican Film Festival	Esther Bell, Ted Passon	Documentary Video	90	
The Very Long Fuse	Steve Hall, Cathee Wilkins	Short Video	3	
The Weather Underground	Sam Green, Bill Siegel	Documentary Video	90	New York Premiere
There There Square	Jacqueline Goss	Experimental Video	14	
The_Future_of_Human_Containment	Michaela Schwentner	Experimental 35mm	5	
To Re-edit the World	David Sherman	Documentary Video	32	
Trailer Town	Giuseppe Andrews	Feature Video	80	World Premiere
Truck	Adrianne Jorge, Tamy Ojala	Documentary Video	55	World Premiere
U	Yuri A	Experimental 16mm	3	
Underground	Emile De Antonio, Mary Lampson, Haskell Wexler	Documentary 16mm	88	
Unkle God	Sean Reynard	Short Video	1	
Untied	Deborah Stratman	Experimental 16mm	3	
Untitled	Eileen Maxson	Experimental Video	4	
Untitled	Andrew Gosselin	Documentary Video	8	
Urban Shift	Zohar Kfir	Experimental Video	4	
Useless	Glen Sanford	Documentary 16mm	27	
Value-Added Cinema: A Product Placement Conpendium	Steve Seid, Peter Conheim	Documentary Video	45	New York Premiere
Vincit Veritas	Remi	Experimental 35mm	10	
WARS	Josef Dabernig	Experimental 16mm	10	
World's Fair World	Bryan Boyce	Experimental Video	9	
Wüstenspringmaus	Jim Finn	Experimental Video	3	
Ye Are The Light of the World (Don't Stare Into the Sun)	Robert A. Greene	Experimental 16mm	10	
Yes	Abbey Williams	Experimental Video	4	
Your Kiss	Euphrosyne P. Konti	Experimental 16mm	3	
Your Name Here	Unknown	Documentary 16mm On Video	10	

== See also ==
- New York Underground Film Festival site
- 2003 Festival Archive
