= Stauffacher (surname) =

Stauffacher is a surname. Notable people with the surname include:

- Barbara Stauffacher Solomon (1928–2024), American landscape architect and graphic designer
- Frank Stauffacher (1917–1955), American experimental filmmaker
- Jack Stauffacher (1920–2017), American printer, typographer, educator, and fine book publisher
- Luke Stauffacher (born 1980), American ice hockey player
- Richard Stauffacher (born 1982), Swiss windsurfer
- Susanne Stauffacher, a.k.a. Susanne Vincenz-Stauffacher (born 1967), Swiss attorney, notary public, and politician
