= Jane Wodening =

American writer (1936–2023)

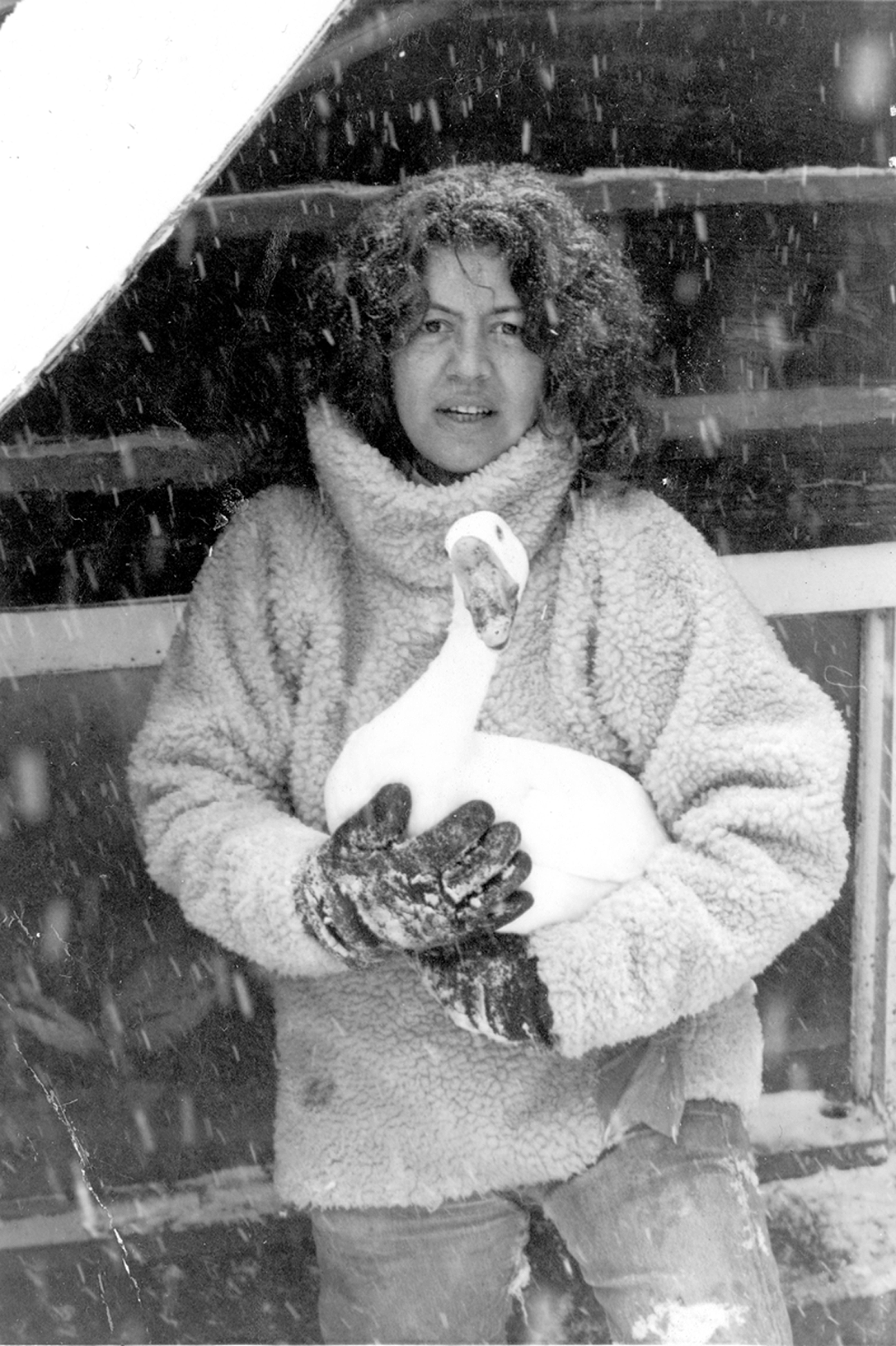
- Jane Wodening c. 1970s
- Born: Mary Jane Collom; September 7, 1936; Western Springs, Illinois, U.S.
- Died: November 17, 2023 (aged 87); Denver, Colorado, U.S.
- Occupation: writer
- Years active: 1976–2023
- Spouse: Stan Brakhage (m. 1957; div. 1987)
- Children: 5

Mary Jane Wodening (née Collom; September 7, 1936 – November 17, 2023) was an American artist and writer. She is best known for her collaborations with experimental filmmaker Stan Brakhage, to whom she was married from 1957 until 1987. During this period, she was known as Jane Brakhage. Wodening featured in Brakhage's short film Window Water Baby Moving, in which her husband filmed her giving birth.

Wodening was an environmentalist and grew her own food and kept animals.

== Life and career ==
Wodening grew up with her brother Jack Collom in Western Springs, Illinois. She married Stan Brakhage in 1957. Before marrying Brakhage, she was studying to be a zoologist. On her reason for dropping out, Wodening said:

I quit school because I was unpopular. I was not the norm, even though I really tried. I wore the right clothes, and I washed myself, I took baths and shaved my armpits, and—oh! The things I did. But it didn't work, none of it worked. I was just weird. I didn't say the right things, I didn't look in the right direction. Out of it, I've always been out of it.

During their marriage, she was featured in one of Brakhage's best-known works, the experimental short film Window Water Baby Moving. In the film, her husband films her giving birth. Critic Archer Winsten described the film as being "so forthright, so full of primitive wonder and love, so far beyond civilization in its acceptance that it becomes an experience like few in the history of movies." The Academy Film Archive preserved Window Water Baby Moving in 2013.

She later appeared in another "birth film" filmed by Brakhage, called Thigh Line Lyre Triangular (1961), though this film was less critically acclaimed. Wodening is also featured in several other works, many of which she played a role in directing, photographing, and editing, such as Cats Cradle (1959), Wedlock House: An Intercourse (1959), and Dog Star Man (1961–64).

Brakhage and Wodening have both said that she played a large role in Brakhage's career. In an interview once, Brakhage is quoted as having said, "'By Brakhage' should be understood to mean 'by way of Stan and Jane Brakhage,' as it does in all my films since marriage. It is coming to mean: 'by way of Stan and Jane and all the children Brakhage.'" Wodening has said:

And so, this point of contention about, was I a partner in Stan's work. Stan said so, over and over again, from the stage. And that's interesting. . . . So, I'll see what I can say, but what I'm speaking from is: I was working on the films.

While Wodening was married to Brakhage, experimental filmmaker and feminist Barbara Hammer made a short documentary about her titled Jane Brakhage. Released in 1974, the film explores her life, with voice-over of Wodening discussing her views on life, nature, philosophy, and being a housewife. In order to focus on Wodening's life, Hammer chose not to include any footage, or mention, of Brakhage (whose work she admired) in the documentary.

After almost 30 years of marriage, Wodening separated from Brakhage in 1986, and the divorce was finalized a year later. Following her divorce, she changed her surname from Brakhage to 'Wodening' as a 'feminine activation of the Germanic god, Woden'. She subsequently lived in her car for two years and drove all over America, creating the book Driveabout. Later, she lived in a tiny cabin at 10,000 feet elevation in the Rocky Mountains, publishing the book Living Up There and collections of short stories.

In 2004, she moved to Denver, Colorado and continued writing books, such as Wolf Dictionary, The Lady Orangutan and Other Stories, Animals I've Neglected to Mention, and Brakhage’s Childhood.

On November 17, 2023, Wodening died at the age of 87 in Denver, Colorado.

=== Scrapbooks ===
In the mid- to late 1960s, Wodening made a set of three scrapbooks that include many of the poets and artists of the time who frequented Brakhage's and her house when they were married. They chronicle Wodening and her family's life during this time period and include newspaper clippings, photos, drawings by both her children and the artists that visited their house, letters from the artists they corresponded with (including Robert Creeley, Edward Dorn, Robert Kelly, and Joseph Cornell), thoughts from daily life, and frames from Brakhage's Mothlight. These are now in the Beinecke Rare Book and Manuscript Library at Yale University. They have been made accessible online.

== Bibliography ==
- Animals I've Neglected to Mention, Sockwood Press, Nederland, 2019
- Driveabout, Sockwood Press, 2016
- Wolf Dictionary, Sockwood Press, 2016
- Brakhage's Childhood, Granary Books, New York, 2016
- The Lady Orangutan and Other Stories, Sockwood Press, 2014
- Living Up There, Baksun Books, Boulder, 2009
- Egypt and Me, Baksun Books, 2012
- First Presence, Baksun Books, 2000
- Mountain Woman Tales, Grackle Books, Nederland, 1994, second edition Mountain Woman Tales and Bird Journal, 1967 - Baksun Books, 2000
- Book of Gargoyles, Baksun Books, 1999
- Moon Songs, situations press, New York, 1997
- The Inside Story, Baksun Books and Rodent Press, 1996
- From the Book of Legends, 100 copies published, Granary Books, New York, 1989, second edition Invisible Books, UK, 1993
- Lump Gulch Tales, Grackle Books, 1993, second edition Baksun Books, 1993

== Filmography ==
- Cats Cradle
- Window Water Baby Moving
- Wedlock House: An Intercourse
- Dog Star Man
- Songs
- Scenes from Under Childhood
- The Machine of Eden
- Star Garden
- Thigh Line Lyre Triangular
