= Jane Belson =

Jane Belson may refer to:

- Jane Conger Belson Shimané (1927–2002), experimental filmmaker
- Jane Belson, lawyer and wife of Douglas Adams
