= 2002 New York Underground Film Festival =

These are the films shown at the 9th New York Underground Film Festival, held from March 6–12, 2002.

Film Name	Director	Type	Length	Notes
A Day in the Hole	Kevin Everson, Roddy Bogawa	Experimental 35mm	6	
A Diamond as Big as the Ritz	Arthur Rocker	Short Super-8 On Video	5	
A Message to Bin Laden	Monroe Bardot	Documentary Video	3	
Abstract Pornographic Film	Chris Jolly	Experimental 16mm	1	
Alien Workshop: Memory Screen	Chris Carter, Mike Hill, Neil Blender	Short Video	1	
Amplified Voices	Angela Aguayo, Lauren Banta	Animation 16mm	1	
Angel's Wild Women	Al Adamson	Feature 35mm	8	
Anorexia Rules, OK!	Cody Critcheloe	Animation 16mm On Video	3	
Autopilot	Robert C. Banks	Experimental 35mm	3	
Bad Coffee	Elizabeth Moore	Short 16mm On Video	3	
Beautiful Frenzy	Christina Hallstrom, Mandra Waback	Documentary Video	52	International Premiere
Beer Goggles	T. Arthur Cottam	Short 16mm	5	
Blind: Video Days	Spike Jones, Karol Winthrop	Short Video	24	
Bridget's Daughter	Charles Olivier	Short Video	25	
Buffalo Common	Bill Brown	Experimental 16mm	23	
Burn	Reynold Reynolds, Patrick Jolley	Short 35mm	10	
Candy Coated Evil	Mike Kuchar	Short Video	7	
Ce qui est fait le mal est fait	Messieurs Delmotte	Experimental Video	4	
Chirpy	John Goras	Animation 16mm On Video	12	
Christabel	James Fotopoulos	Experimental 16mm On Video	70	World Premiere
CLIP (4000 f.)	Robert Todd	Experimental 16mm	3	
Come Alive	Dylan Griffen	Short Super-8 On Video	1	
Condensed Movie #1	Kent Lambert	Experimental Video	9	
Crying Underwater	Alicia Scherson	Experimental Video	17	
Cul de Sac: A Suburban War Story	Garrett Scott	Documentary Video	55	World Premiere
Current	Brian Doyle	Experimental Video	6	
Cyclone Alley Ceramics	George Kuchar	Short Video	12	
Dear Auntie	Matt Wolf	Experimental 16mm On Video		International Premiere
Dildo Heaven	Doris Wishman	Feature Video	70	World Premiere
Dirtboarding Skateopia	Rick Charnoski	Documentary Video	2	
Dogs	Stephanie Barber	Experimental 16mm	15	
Eat	Bill Plympton	Animation 35mm	9	
Eels	Patty Chang	Experimental Video	4	
Einstuerzende Neubauten: Listen With Pain	Christian Beetz, Birgit Herdlitschke	Documentary Video	55	
El Guero	Jim Finn	Experimental 16mm On Video	2	
Everything Will Be Okay	Scott Pagano	Experimental Video	5	
Exposed	Siegfried Fruhauf	Experimental 16mm	9	
Film(Dzama)	Deco Dawson	Experimental 16mm	23	
First Person 911	Luke Joerger, Ray Mendez	Documentary Video	25	
Forrest Project	Michael Jackson Chaney	Experimental 35mm	3	
Four Corners	Ian Toews	Experimental 16mm	6	
Friends Forever	Ben Wolfinsohn	Documentary Video	83	
Getting Stronger Every Day	Miranda July	Experimental Video	6	
Girls For Rent	Al Adamson	Feature 35mm	88	
Gone Over	Christofer Bravo	Experimental 16mm	10	
Grip of the Gorgon	Mike Kuchar	Short Video	11	
Have A Nice Day Alone	Leslie Thornton	Experimental Video	7	
Hillbilly Robot	Todd Rohal	Short Video	23	
Hollywood Inferno (Episode One)	Laura Parnes	Experimental Video	40	
Honey Bunnies on Ice	George Kuchar	Short Video	7	
Horns and Halos	Suki Hawley, Michael Galinsky	Documentary Video	90	North American Premiere
How Does Electricity Work?	Jenny Stark	Experimental Video	3	
I'm simply overwhelmed, I just don't know what to say - Thank you all very much. Good night.	Roddy Bogawa	Experimental Video	20	
In Our Garden	Giuseppe Andrews	Feature Video	87	World Premiere
Introduction to Living in a Closed System	Brittany Gravely	Experimental 16mm	18	
Investigation of a Flame	Lynne Sachs	Documentary 16mm	45	
Ken Burns Give You Something	Kent Lambert	Experimental Video	3	
Lily	Mike Kuchar	Short Video	4	
Little Flags	Jem Cohen	Experimental 16mm On Video	7	
Lockdowns Up	Ashley Hunt	Documentary Video	8	
Lord of the Cockrings	Nick Zedd	Short Video	27	
Love is All	Oliver Harrison	Experimental 35mm	3	
Matinee Idylls	George Kuchar	Short Video	12	
Momus at Luna	Jeff Scher	Documentary 16mm	12	
Negative 10	Jenny Stark	Experimental Video	3	
New World Order Re-Mix	Philipp Virus	Experimental Video	12	
Nitwit	Xan Price	Feature Video	100	World Premiere
No Sunshine	Bjorn Melhus	Experimental Video	6	
Oh Christmas Tree	Juli Berg, Candace Corelli	Experimental Video	2	
On a Shore Beneath the Sky	Mike Kuchar	Short Video	18	
One Mile Per Minute	Bobby Abate	Experimental Super-8 On Video	10	
Our Nation: A Korean Punk Rock Community	Stephen Epstein, Timothy Tangherlini	Documentary Video	39	
Our Vacation Trip	Arunas Kulikauskas	Experimental 16mm	3	
Periodical Effect	Stom Sogo	Experimental Video	10	
Plain English	John Standiford	Experimental 16mm	9	
Prohibited Beats	Julie Covello	Documentary Video	25	
Radio Haiti	Moira Tierney	Documentary 16mm	4	
Resin	Vladimir Gyorski	Animation Video	87	New York Premiere
Resolution	Spencer Parsons	Experimental Video	9	International Premiere
Revolutions Per Minute	Alex Roper	Experimental Video	3	World Premiere
Richart	Rankin Renwick, Dawn Smallman	Documentary Video	23	
Saint Henry Composition	Joe Sola	Experimental Super-8 On Video	5	
Satan's Sadists	Al Adamson	Feature 35mm	86	
Saw Boy Buck!	Richard Mather	Animation Video	3	
Sex Toy	Zakery Weiss	Documentary Video	1	
Showdown	J. X. Williams	Experimental 16mm	8	
Silverplay	Stom Sogo	Experimental Video	10	
Sledding Accident 1986	Chris Jolly	Experimental Video	2	
Slow Business of Going	Athina Tsangari	Feature 35mm	101	
Soundings	Sandra Gibson	Experimental 16mm	5	
Spangled	Jason Blalock	Documentary Video	21	
Standing By Yourself	Josh Koury	Documentary Video	57	New York Premiere
State of the Union	Bryan Boyle	Animation Video		
Teenage Hooker Became Killing Machine in DaeHakRoh	Nam Ki-Woong	Feature Video	60	US Premiere
The 100th Undone	Jacqueline Goss	Experimental Video	9	
The Atlas Moth	Rolf Belgum	Documentary Video	75	
The Drifters, excerpts: Good Together, The Fruit, Jewels	Miranda July	Experimental Video	1	
The Electronic Bra	Anonymous	Documentary Video	1	
The Fat (Facts about skateboarding)	Lucia Helenka	Documentary Video	13	
The Fear	Angel Nieves	Short 16mm	18	
The History of Choking (with Erick Estrada)	Abel Klainbaum	Documentary Video	30	
The Local Sky Enlarger	Jennet Thomas	Experimental Video	27	
The Money Center	Naoko Nozawa	Short Video	15	
The Nagel Incident	Steve Hall	Short Video	16	
The Second Voice	Zakery Weiss	Documentary Video	12	
The Strip Mall Trilogy	Roger Beebe	Experimental Super-8 On Video	9	
then a year	Kelly Reichardt	Experimental Super-8 On Video	14	
Triumf	Seth Price	Experimental Video	16	
Two Minutes Skating in NYC	Andrew Gosselin	Short Video	2	
Untitled	Zakery Weiss	Experimental Video	4	
Well, Well, Well	Elisabeth Subrin	Experimental Video	4	
With Me	Kerstin Cmelka	Experimental 16mm	3	
Ya Private Sky		Experimental Video	3	

== See also ==
- New York Underground Film Festival site
- 2002 Festival Archive
