= James Whitney (filmmaker) =

American film director

- Born: December 27, 1921; Pasadena, California, US
- Died: April 8, 1982 (aged 60); Los Angeles, California, US
- Known for: Film
- Notable work: Lapis, Yantra
- Movement: Visionary Cinema
- Awards: Best Sound, 1949 Brussels Experimental Film Competition

James Whitney (December 27, 1921 – April 8, 1982), younger brother of John, was a filmmaker regarded as one of the great masters of abstract cinema. Several of his films are classics in the genre of visual music.

== Early life ==
James Whitney was born December 27, 1921, in Pasadena, California, and lived all his life in the Los Angeles area. He studied painting, and traveled in England before the outbreak of World War II. In 1940, he returned to Pasadena.

== Career – early works ==
James completed a number of short films over four decades, two of which required at least five years of work. James collaborated with his brother John for some of his early film work.

The first of the brothers' films was Twenty-Four Variations on an Original Theme. Its structure was influenced by Schoenberg's serial principles.

James spent 3 years working on Variations on a Circle (1942), which lasts some 20 minutes, and was made with 8mm film.

James and John created their series of Five Film Exercises (John #1 and #5; James #2, #3 and #4) between 1943 and 1944, for which the brothers won a prize for best sound at the 1949 Brussels Experimental Film Competition.

In 1946, the brothers travelled to San Francisco Museum of Modern Art to show their films at the first of ten annual "Art in Cinema" festivals, organized by Frank Stauffacher.

Following this period, James became more involved in spiritual interests such as Jungian psychology, alchemy, yoga, Tao, and Jiddu Krishnamurti. These interests heavily influenced his later work. James was a potter and ceramicist, interested in raku ware, and examples of his pottery still exist today.

== Career – later works ==
Screenshot from "Lapis" by James Whitney

Between 1950 and 1955, James laboured to construct Yantra. The film was produced entirely by hand. By punching grid patterns in 5 in × 7 in (130 mm × 180 mm) cards with a pin, James was able to paint through these pinholes onto other 5 in × 7 in (130 mm × 180 mm) cards, to create images of rich complexity and give the finished work a very dynamic and flowing motion, but the film was not completed yet. It was first released as a silent film.

A very short, black and white, manipulated fragment from an early version of Yantra was shown at one of the historic Vortex Concerts in San Francisco's Morrison planetarium in early 1959. Soon after Vortex, the film acquired its soundtrack, when Jordan Belson synchronized it to an excerpt from Henk Badings’ "Cain and Abel". This did not occur at the Morrison Planetarium Vortex Concerts, contrary to popular belief (Keefer, 2008).

Analogue computer equipment developed by brother John, allowed James to complete Lapis (1966) in two years, when it might have taken seven years otherwise. James drew dot patterns again for this film, but the camera was positioned using computer control, allowing each image to be overlaid from multiple angles. In this piece, smaller circles oscillate in and out in an array of colors resembling a kaleidoscope while being accompanied by Indian sitar music. The patterns become hypnotic and trance inducing.

Dwija (1973), meaning "twice-born" or "soul" in Sanskrit, is completely solarized, and much of the imagery is re-photographed by rear-projection to create a constant flow of hardly definable transformations of color and form.

Wu Ming (1977), meaning "no name" in Chinese, repeats a single action over and over – a particle disappears into infinity, and returns as a wave. James described the particle-to-wave action in Wu Ming as being "like throwing a pebble into water and seeing the ripples spread out".

His two final films, intended to form a quartet with Dwija and Wu Ming, were Kang Jing Xiang and Li, which were left incomplete when James died April 8, 1982, after a brief and unexpected illness. Kang was completed post-humously according to James' instructions. His short test for Li is believed to be lost.

Several of James' films were preserved by Center for Visual Music, Los Angeles (CVM); HD transfers from their preservation project were seen in major museum exhibitions including Visual Music at MOCA and The Hirshhorn Museum (2005), Sons et Lumieres at Centre Pompidou (2004–05), The Third Mind at The Guggenheim Museum, and other shows. Scholars may view high quality copies of Yantra and Lapis at CVM. CVM also provided prints from this preservation to Centre Pompidou, Paris, which provided support for this project. As of this writing in 2017, the films are largely not in distribution, and difficult to rent or screen.

== Archive ==
The Academy Film Archive houses the Whitney Collection and has preserved over a dozen films from the collection. The collection encompasses the work of John and James Whitney, as well as John's sons Mark, John, and Michael.

== Filmography ==
- Twenty Four Variations on an Original Theme (with John Whitney) (1939–1940) 5 min, 8mm
- 3 Untitled Films (with John Whitney) (1940–1942) 15 min 8mm
- Variations on a Circle (1941–1942) 9 min, 8mm
- Film Exercises #2, #3 (1943–1944) 3 min, 16mm and #4 (1944) 8 min, 16mm. Actually he is credited along with his brother John for their Film Exercises 1 - 5.
- Yantra (1950–1957) 8 min, 16mm. Sound added in 1959.
- Lapis (1963–1966) 10 min, 16mm
- Dwija (1973), 16mm.
- Wu Ming (1977) 17 min, 16mm.
- Kang Jing Xiang (1982) 13 min, 16mm. Completed posthumously.
- Li (unfinished)

OTHER:

- High Voltage (1959) 3 min, 16mm, constructed by Jordan Belson from James' footage, not directed by James
