= Hy Hirsh =

American photographer, filmmaker (1911–1961)

- Born: Hyman Hirsh; October 11, 1911; Philadelphia, Pennsylvania
- Died: November 1961 (aged 49–50); Paris, France
- Known for: Photography, Film, Animation
- Spouse(s): Mae Agronowsky (1934–1936); Marie Gattman (1939–1961)

Hyman Hirsh (October 11, 1911, Philadelphia, Pennsylvania – November 1961, Paris, France), was an American photographer and experimental filmmaker. He is regarded as a visual music filmmaker, as well as one of the first filmmakers to use electronic imagery (filmed oscilloscope patterns) in a film.

== Life and career ==
Hy Hirsh was born in 1911 to Russian immigrants Max and Olga Hirsh. The family moved to Southern California in 1916 where Hy Hirsh developed an interest in filmmaking and photography. At age 19 he began working in Hollywood and was employed by Columbia Studios from 1930 to 1936 as a cameraman and still photographer. He began side work as an art photographer in 1932 and had his first solo exhibition in 1935.

In 1936 Hirsh was employed as a photographer by President Roosevelt's Works Progress Administration, and in 1937 he turned to avant-garde cinema, playing a comic role in the satirical experimental film, Even—As You And I. In 1937, Hirsh moved to San Francisco where he became the official photographer for both the California Palace of the Legion of Honor and the M. H. de Young Memorial Museum, where he photographed artwork, processed film and made prints. He also discreetly used the museum's darkroom for his own artistic pursuits until he left the museum in 1954.

Throughout the 1940s Hirsh worked as a photographer and cinematographer. He collaborated with Sidney Peterson on several films, and after moving to San Francisco, gave technical advice and assistance to numerous abstract filmmakers, including Jordan Belson, Harry Smith, Frank Stauffacher, Patricia Marx and Larry Jordan. He participated in the creation of a number of films before starting to make shis own abstract animated shorts in 1951. An avid jazz fan, Hirsh used the music of Thelonious Monk and the Modern Jazz Quartet, as well as African drumming and Caribbean carnival band to score his films. His love of music became so intertwined with his filmmaking that it is now regarded as visual music.

In 1955 Hirsh relocated to Paris and for a while to Amsterdam where he worked at a puppet animation studio. Commercial photography work for Vanity Fair, Elle, Réalités and other magazines enabled him to travel widely, and he spent some time in Spain. His home in his later years was Paris, France, where he continued his photography and to make experimental films. His shorts, Gyromorphosis (1956) and Autumn Spectrum (1957) won awards at the 1958 Brussels Experimental Film Competition. His films were sometimes accompanied by live jazz musicians and several projectors running at once.

Hirsh's many talents led him to build his own optical printer, and he used then-new wire recording equipment to document live jazz. He also gained repute as a gourmet cook. He is alleged by film historian Willian Moritz to have produced some 15 documentaries for American television, though no documentation has ever been found.

Hirsh died of a heart attack in 1961 in Paris.

The opening credits of Walerian Borowczyk's short stop-motion film Renaissance (1963) include the caption "en hommage á Hy Hirsh" ("in tribute to Hy Hirsh").

== Personal life ==
Hy Hirsh had one child, Diane, with Mae Agronowsky in 1934. The family lived together for two years before Hirsh left, finding traditional family life too confining. In 1939 he married Marie Gattman, a dancer and actress with whom he shared an interest in left-wing politics as well as his bohemian lifestyle. The couple lived in Los Angeles for a short time before moving to San Francisco's Haight Street.

== Photography style ==
Hirsh's early photographs were influenced by California photography movement Group f/64, who had first exhibited in 1932 at the de Young Museum where Hirsh later worked. In 1932. Hirsh's photo work from that period used sharply focused black and white renderings and little manipulation in their process. Hirsh was then influenced by the social documentary of the Farm Security Administration photographers who recorded the impact of the Great Depression on displaced workers and their families. Hirsh followed suit, exploring social issues through visages of vacant lots, rusted machinery, and other images of urban decay. Recognition for these photographs led to seven exhibitions in Los Angeles and San Francisco from 1935 to 1955. A 1936 group show entitled "Seven Photographers" at L.A.'s Stanley Rose Gallery put him alongside the leading figures of West Coast photography, including Ansel Adams, Edward Weston and Brett Weston. Hirsh also appeared in the publication U.S. Camera in 1936, 1937 and 1939.

In 1943 San Francisco Museum of Art featured Hirsh in a solo exhibition. By now Hirsh had moved away from the straight-ahead aesthetic of Ansel Adams and Group f64, and his artistic photography took more cues from the world of experimental film. He made surrealist self-portraits by superimposing negatives of himself with broken sheets of glass. Later in Paris, as a study for one of his films, he shot color slides of old wall posters that were peeling, exposing layers of posters underneath.

== Film technique ==
According to some texts, Hirsh led a disorderly life, maintaining little interest in preserving or completing his own work. In his later career, some of his film screenings were live events with multiple projectors. He treated films as malleable objects by constantly editing and re-editing them, using live music instead of pre-recorded soundtracks. According to several texts by William Moritz, upon Hirsh's death in 1961 in Paris, the police found hashish in his apartment, and impounded all of Hirsh's property, including finished and unfinished films. When the police released the material three years later, many films and papers were missing.

For his first film, Divertissement Rococo (1951), and several subsequent films, he employed filmed oscilloscope imagery. In Come Closer (1953), he acknowledged the then-current fad of 3-D film by layering multi-colored circular imagery, on 2 separate synched films for 3-D projection, intended to be viewed with 3-D glasses. This was later screened by Moritz and a few others as a single film, though it is correctly a 2-panel, 3D film.

In Gyromorphosis (1954), 7 min, made in Amsterdam, Hy Hirsh displays the kinetic qualities of the New Babylon structures of Constant Nieuwenhuys.

For Chasse de touches ("The Chase of Brushstrokes", 1959), Hirsh animated layers of colored oils, and in Autumn Spectrum (1957), used the movement of water and light in Amsterdam to create layers. In 1958 he filmed peeling walls and pieces of old posters in Paris for Defense d'Afficher ("Post No Bills"). In 1961, he scratched animated images over live-action footage for Scratch Pad, which incorporated imagery from previous films and found footage as well.

== Preservation ==
Hirsh's surviving still photographic materials, including hundreds of slides (from Paris, Amsterdam, Spain and his later European years), color prints and gelatin silver prints, are in the archive of Center for Visual Music, Los Angeles.

The Academy Film Archive has preserved a number of Hy Hirsh's films, including Autumn Spectrum, Chasse Des Touches, and Scratch Pad.

== Selected filmography ==
=== Solo works ===
- Divertissement Rococo, 1951
- Eneri, 1953
- Come Closer, stereoscopic, 1953
- Gyromorphosis, 1954
- Autumn Spectrum, 1957
- Défense d'afficher ("Post No Bills"), 1958
- Chasse des Touches 1959
- Scratch Pad, 1961 (18fps with sound)
- La Couleur de la forme, 1961 (non-original music added, original soundtrack unknown)
- Etude Anatomique du Photographe, 1961 (presumed lost)

Décollages recollés, 1960, unfinished, was not listed in Hirsh's CV of completed films, but exists in its unfinished state as a double, two projector film, 16mm, silent.

=== Collaborations ===
- Even—As You And I (1937) with Roger Barlow, Harry Hay and LeRoy Robbins
- The Cage (1947) with Sidney Peterson
- Horror Dream (1947) with Sidney Peterson
- Clinic of Stumble (1948) with Sidney Peterson
- Film No. 4 (1948) with Harry Smith
- The Lead Shoes (1949) with Sidney Peterson
- Notes on the Port of St. Francis (1951) co-produced with director Frank Stauffacher
