= The Adventures of Jimmy =

- Directed by: James Broughton
- Release date: 1950
- Running time: 12 minutes
- Country: United States
- Language: English

The Adventures of Jimmy is a 1950 American short experimental film directed by, and starring, James Broughton. It was Broughton's second film as sole director, following Mother's Day (1948), and was filmed by Art in Cinema founder Frank Stauffacher with an original musical score by Weldon Kees.

== Plot ==
Jimmy (Broughton) is a woodsman who lives in a remote, mountain cabin. Several times he travels to the city in search of a wife, each time changing his appearance and clothing somewhat in hopes of improving his chances.

== Legacy ==
The film reportedly combined elements of farce and slapstick with the emerging experimental film genre, and as such would have been considerably lighter fare than Broughton's prior collaboration with Sidney Peterson, The Potted Psalm (1946) or his own Mother's Day. Although Broughton was no longer including it in his touring film programs by the late 1970s, at that time The Adventures of Jimmy was still available for rental from the Film-Makers' Cooperative and Canyon Cinema. At some point the title was withdrawn from circulation, and The Adventures of Jimmy has become a very difficult title to see; regrettable, as it contains the film score by Weldon Kees. Kees was primarily a poet, painter and short story author whose music making is only sparsely documented.

== See also ==
- List of avant-garde films of the 1950s
