= Jane Conger Belson Shimané =

American film director (1927–2002)

- Born: 1927; Missouri, U.S.
- Died: 2002 (aged 74–75)
- Occupation: filmmaker
- Known for: Odds & Ends (1959)

Jane Conger Belson Shimané (1927–2002) was an American experimental filmmaker.

== Life and career ==
Jane Conger Belson Shimané was born in Missouri. She studied at the San Francisco Art Institute, where she met the artist Jordan Belson. Though she used his name, they never legally married. Her first film, Logos, premiered in 1957 and was screened at festivals in North America, Europe, and Latin America. The animated film featured an electronic score by Henry Jacobs, a sound artist who also collaborated with her husband on the groundbreaking "Vortex" light shows.

In 1959 she made Odds & Ends, a short animated film that pokes fun at the avant-garde film culture of the 1950s. To make the film, she combined recycled travel and advertising footage with her own animations — made from paper cutouts, color fields, and line drawings — and added a "faux hipster" narration by Jacobs, with bongos playing in the background. (Jacobs is credited as "Rheny Bojacs," an anagram of his name.) The narrator natters pretentiously about poetry and jazz, contradicting himself at every turn, one moment claiming that "money doesn't count" and the next mentioning the possibility of grants and subsidies. The satire, which appears to have been aimed at her husband, may have precipitated the end of their marriage. Shimané apparently stopped making films soon after parting with Belson.

== Accolades and legacy ==
In 1960 Odds & Ends won a Creative Film Award, a cash prize awarded by the film society Cinema 16 and the Creative Film Foundation (the scholarship established by Maya Deren for experimental filmmakers). Other winners that year included Robert Breer, Bruce Conner, Ed Emshwiller, and Stan Vanderbeek. Upon receiving the award, Shimané responded, "I don't know just what to say other than I have been extremely impressed with the works of other film makers and 'I just got high and put it together.'" The film is included on Treasures IV: American Avant-Garde Film, 1947-1986, a DVD set published in 2008 by the National Film Preservation Foundation.

Both Logos and Odds & Ends have been preserved by the Academy Film Archive, in 2001 and 2006, respectively.

== Filmography ==
- Logos (1957) 16mm, 2 min.
- Odds & Ends (1959) 16mm, 3:40 min.
