= Jack Collom =

American poet, essayist, and creative writing pedagogue

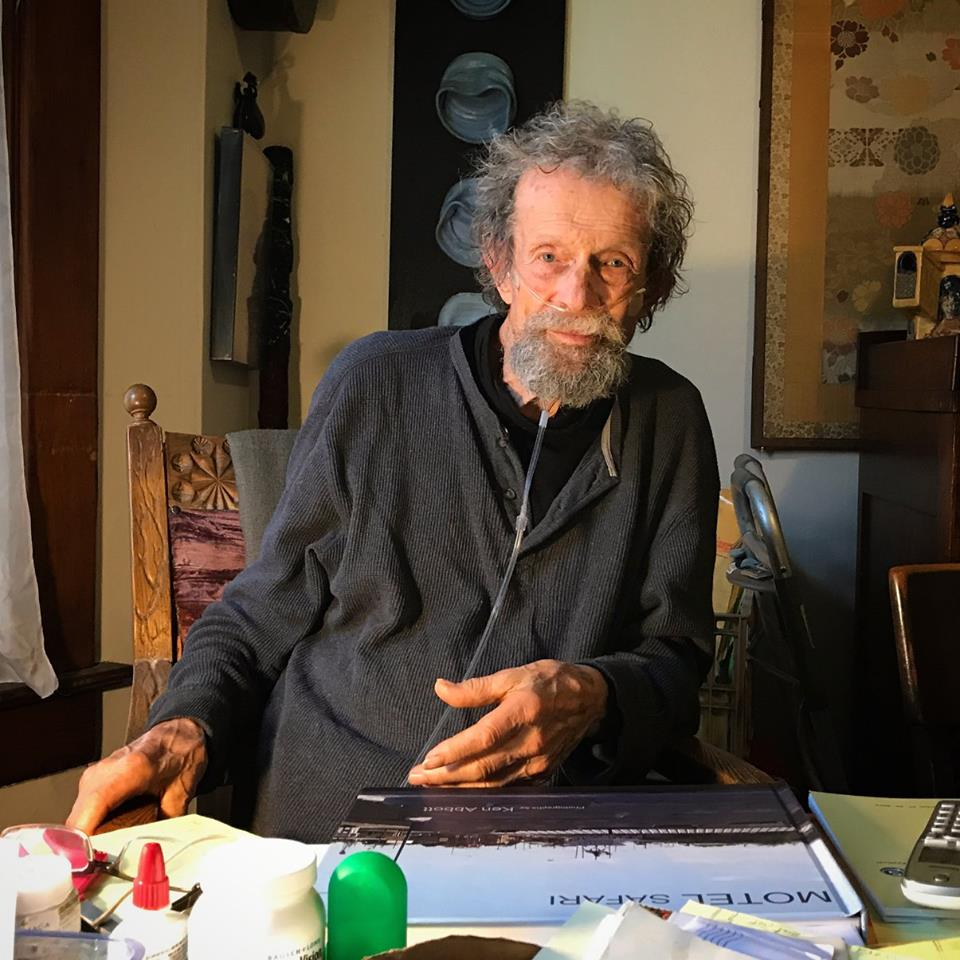
- Jack Collom, was an American poet, essayist, and educator.
- Born: John Aldridge Collom; November 8, 1931; Chicago, Illinois, U.S.
- Died: July 2, 2017 (aged 85); Boulder, Colorado, U.S.
- Education: Colorado A&M; University of Colorado Boulder, BA and MA
- Occupations: Poet; teacher; essayist
- Spouse(s): Edeltraud Maria Teresia Hopps (div. 1974); Mara Meshak (div.); Jennifer Heath
- Children: Nathaniel, Christopher, Franz, Sierra
- Writing career
- Notable awards: NEA Poetry Fellowship (1980, 1990)

John Aldridge Collom (November 8, 1931 – July 2, 2017) was an American poet, essayist, and creative writing pedagogue. Included among the twenty-five books he published during his lifetime were Red Car Goes By: Selected Poems 1955–2000; Poetry Everywhere: Teaching Poetry Writing in School and in the Community; and Second Nature, which won the 2013 Colorado Book Award for Poetry. In the fields of education and creative writing, he was involved in eco-literature, ecopoetics, and writing instruction for children.

== Life and work ==
Jack Collom was born John Aldridge Collom in Chicago on November 8, 1931. He and his sister Jane Wodening grew up in the small town of Western Springs, Illinois, spent much of his time birdwatching, and over the years became an inveterate bird-watcher. Collom moved to Fraser, Colorado in 1947. He studied forestry at Colorado A&M College where he earned a B.S. in 1952. Afterwards, he spent four years in the U.S. Air Force and he started writing poetry in 1955 while stationed in Tripoli, Libya. His unit was next stationed at Neubiberg, a base just south of Munich in Bavaria. It is there he met his first wife (a native German) in 1956. Collom moved back to the US after his discharge from the military but soon returned to Germany for a brief time to get married. They naturalized back to America in 1959 where he worked in factories for twenty years while writing poetry.

Collom received his B.A. in English (1972) and M.A. in English literature (1974) from the University of Colorado Boulder where he had studied on the G.I. Bill. In 1974, he began teaching in the "Poetry-in-the-Schools" programs in Colorado, Wyoming, and Nebraska. In 1980, he began teaching poetry in the public schools of New York City, by way of the "Poets In Public Service" and "Teachers & Writers" programs. Collom continued to teach creative writing to children for the next 35 years in both elementary and secondary schools, where he developed a pedagogy for this type of educational approach.

I think of my general approach as organic, inductive, building from the children's familiars up, rather than teaching them intricate forms to master, or attempting to initiate them into a sophisticated sensibility. Time enough for that, and to avoid its pitfalls, when and if they have written personally for some while, and of course writing personally in some strong sense is what the most developed poetry still is. Heavy programming from me at this point would draw out less of their particular gifts.

Subsequently, Teachers & Writers Collaborative published three books of Collom's essays and commentary on this experience (which included the young students' poems), notably Poetry Everywhere and Moving Windows.

From 1966 to 1977, he published the work of many writers in a little magazine called "The". He was twice awarded Poetry Fellowships from the National Endowment for the Arts and received a Foundation for Contemporary Arts Grants to Artists award (2012). From 1986 until his death in 2017, Collom taught at Naropa University's Jack Kerouac School of Disembodied Poetics as an adjunct professor where he shaped Writing Outreach, a community creative-writing project, into a course. In 1989 he pioneered Eco-Lit, one of the first ecology literature courses ever offered in the United States. Some of his accomplishments as an environmentalist-poet are documented in American Environmental Leaders: From Colonial Times to the Present. His nature writings and essays about the environment were published in various venues, including ecopoetics, The Alphabet of Trees: A Guide to Writing Nature Poetry, and ISLE, the journal of Interdisciplinary Studies in Literature and the Environment.

He read and taught throughout the United States, in Mexico, Costa Rica, Austria, Belgium, and Germany. In 2008, he was the plenary speaker at the "Poetic Ecologies" conference at the Université Libre de Bruxelles. In 2009, he led a three-week Creativity and Aging Program at Woodland Pattern in Milwaukee, Wisconsin.

He worked with numerous dancers, visual artists and musician/composers, and recorded three CDs: Calluses of Poetry and Colors Born of Shadow, with Ken Bernstein, and Blue Yodel Blue Heron, with Dan Hankin and Sierra Collom.

In 2001, his adopted hometown of Boulder, Colorado, declared and celebrated a "Jack Collom Day".

== Personal life ==
I felt, and events have born out, that eco-lit was really an upcoming topic for the world. I was motivated by the cause of ecology—saving nature and ourselves from our own foolish extinction through pollution and overuse of resources—and the fact that it's an art with admirable philosophical achievements. But also for the fun of it. Humor is an important part of the class, and we can go from discussing the most tragic thing to cracking jokes. I'm for that kind of juxtaposition, which sometimes goes against expectations because people want to look upon nature very solemnly due to its beauty or endangered status. But I think humor is as deep as anything.

— Jack Collom

Collom was married three times. He had three sons by his first marriage. He had a daughter through a second marriage.

Jack Collom died in Boulder, Colorado on July 2, 2017.

== Selected publications ==
Poetry

- Arguing with Something Plato Said. (Rocky Ledge Editions, 1990) ISBN 9780961437831
- The Task. (Baksun Books, 1996) ISBN 9781887997065
- Red Car Goes By: Selected Poems 1955–2000. (Tuumba Press, 2001) ISBN 9781931157018
- Exchanges of Earth and Sky. (Fish Drum Press, 2006) ISBN 9781929495085
- Situations, Sings (with Lyn Hejinian). (Adventures in Poetry, 2007) ISBN 9780976161240
- Second Nature. (Boulder, Co: Instance Press, 2012) ISBN 9781887997270
- Dot's Diner (with Elizabeth Robinson). (Colorado Springs, Co: Further Other Book Works, 2017) ISBN 9780989313278

Nonfiction

- Poetry Everywhere: Teaching Poetry Writing in School and in the Community (with Sheryl Noethe). (Teachers & Writers Collaborative, 1994; 2nd edition, 2007) ISBN 9780915924691
- (contributor) Old Faithful: 18 Writers Present Their Favorite Writing Assignments, (ed. Ron Padgett). (Teachers & Writers Collaborative, 1995; 2nd edition, 2007) ISBN 9780915924455
- (editor) A Slow Flash of Light: An Anthology of Poems about Poetry. (Teachers & Writers Collaborative, 2008) ISBN 9780915924561
- Moving Windows: Evaluating the Poetry Children Write. (Teachers & Writers Collaborative, 2000) ISBN 9780915924554
- (contributor) The &NOW Awards 2: The Best Innovative Writing (Illinois), 2013
