= Notes on the Port of St. Francis =

- Directed by: Frank Stauffacher
- Written by: Robert Louis Stevenson
- Produced by: Frank Stauffacher
- Starring: Vincent Price (narrator)
- Distributed by: Film Images Inc.
- Release date: 1951
- Running time: 22 minutes
- Country: United States
- Language: English

Notes on the Port of St. Francis is a 1951 American short impressionistic documentary film on San Francisco, directed by Frank Stauffacher, and with narration written by Robert Louis Stevenson (1882) and read by Vincent Price. The film opens with "An Epitaph" by Walter de la Mare. The film was made in 16mm film, is 22 minutes long, and has been preserved by the Pacific Film Archive at University of California, Berkeley. Stauffacher was assisted by Hy Hirsh, Allon Schoener, Herb Gleitz, and Gene Tepper. The film was co-produced by Stauffacher, the SF Maritime Museum, and the California Historical Society.

On December 18, 2013, the Library of Congress announced that the film had been selected for preservation in the National Film Registry for being "culturally, historically, or aesthetically significant".

== See also ==
- Vincent Price filmography
- National Film Preservation Foundation
