= Henry Jacobs =

American humorist and sound artist

Henry Sandy Jacobs (October 9, 1924 – September 25, 2015) was an American sound artist and humorist.

== Early life and education ==
Jacobs was born in Chicago, Illinois. After a tour in the Air Corps — during which time he acquired some broadcasting experience — he graduated from the University of Chicago, and moved to Mexico City. There, around 1950, he appeared on Mexican radio station XEW and fledgling television station XHTV.

== Graduate school and early sound recordings ==
In 1952, Jacobs returned to Chicago and began experimenting with reel to reel tape recorders, taking particular advantage of the ease with which they made it possible to manipulate sound directly. Ambient, everyday sound, and especially the structural variety of apparently spontaneous sounds, interested him; at one point he ventured to Haiti to make street recordings. While attending graduate courses at the University of Illinois, he also produced a regular program on the campus radio station (WILL) entitled Music and Folklore, which is believed by some to be one of the first presentations of "world music" to an American audience. Jacobs often brought experts in certain ethnic musics onto the show to provide background information. When no experts were available, he would not infrequently fake it - most notably in the case of "Sholem Stein", a putative Hebrew musicologist who claimed that calypso music had deep Rabbinical meanings. These were largely improvised with humorist and colleague Woody Leafer.

== Career as sound artist ==
Pacifica station KPFA in Berkeley started receiving tapes of Music and Folklore not long after the program began, so Bay Area audiences were already familiar with Jacobs when he moved to San Francisco in 1953 and took up the show in person. While still at Berkeley, Jacobs assembled two tape recorders and re-recorded many of the percussive sounds that he had recorded on the road (and in his own studio) while varying the speed of the tape as he re-recorded them, and then spliced the unusual new percussive sounds into tape loops, recording them again into a montage of loops entitled "Sonata For Loudspeakers", which first appeared on the "Radio Program No. 1" Folkways disk, and eventually was included on the 1957 Folkways album, "Sounds of New Music" (Folkways disk no. FX 6160.) Meanwhile, he continued to pursue an interest in all aspects of sound, in the composition of musique concrete, in improvisational theatre and humor. He met poets Lawrence Ferlinghetti, Kenneth Rexroth, Allen Ginsberg, comedian Lenny Bruce (whose first recording was a Jacobs project, Interviews of Our Times), and percussionist Mongo Santamaría.

Most important among these new social contacts were the friendships he struck up with Ken Nordine, "the father of word jazz", and Alan Watts, a gifted raconteur and former Anglican priest best known for popularizing and interpreting Eastern philosophy for a Western audience. Jacobs, upon taking the helm at his friend Bill Loughborough's record label, MEA, in 1959, set about releasing several recordings of Watts. He was co-curator of the Alan Watts archive. Moe Asch, the founder of Folkways Records, offered Jacobs the opportunity to release his first record, Radio Programme No 1 Audio Collage: Henry Jacobs’ Music and Folklore, in 1955.

In 1957, working with artist Jordan Belson, Jacobs produced the Vortex Concerts, a series of concerts featuring new music, including some of Jacobs' own, and that of Karlheinz Stockhausen, and many others - taking place in the Morrison Planetarium in Golden Gate Park, San Francisco. Sound designers, including Walter Murch, the sound designer of Apocalypse Now, commonly regard this as the origin of the (now standard) concept of "surround sound." The program was popular, and Jacobs and Belson were invited to present a version of it at the 1958 World Expo in Brussels. Jacobs appeared as the narrator, "Rheny Bojacs", in Jane Conger Belson Shimané's 1959 film Odds and Ends.

Jacobs' album, The Wide Weird World of Shorty Petterstein consisted largely of encounters between hipsters and unknowing squares. One interviewer asks about art to be told, "Art? He's been with the band about six months. Blows good piano." When the interviewer protests that pianos aren't blown, but played with the hands, Shorty returns the opaque reply, "Blow is like an instrument." Shorty also stars in a 1961 cartoon short, The Interview, directed by Ernest Pintoff.

=== Collaborations with filmmakers ===
Jacobs collaborated with filmmaker Jordan Belson on the soundtrack for an 8-minute, 16 mm film titled Allures, completed in 1961. In 1963, Jacobs released an album titled The Laughing String. With the backing of the American Cancer Society, Jacobs, in collaboration with John Korty, put together an animated short film about quitting smoking, Breaking the Habit, which was nominated for an Academy Award in 1964. This brought Jacobs far enough into the limelight to get remunerative work as a sound consultant. In the late sixties he created radio advertisements for Japan Airlines and supplied audio/visual ideas to Bank of America's marketing division. Jacobs's approach to sound manipulation greatly interested Walter Murch and George Lucas, and he was tapped to provide some improvised soundtrack material and background dialogue for Lucas's film THX 1138. Jacobs was godfather to sound designer Ren Klyce.

In 1972, Jacobs collaborated with Bob McClay and Chris Koch on a series of half-hour television programs for San Francisco public television station KQED. "The Fine Art of Goofing Off" was a sort of philosophical Sesame Street; each program would develop an open-ended theme, like "time" or "work" in an unpredictable collage of brief episodes in a variety of different styles of animation. Alan Watts, improv troop The Committee, artist Victor Moscoso, musicians Mark Unobsky and Pete Sears, Woody Leafer, and Jordan Belson all contributed to the series. The CD/DVD set by this name has been described as " a kaleidescopic array of sound bites that are alternately funny, charmingly nostalgic, bizarre, psychedelic or inexplicable."

Jacobs was joined by David Grieve on a 1973 film, Essential Alan Watts: Man in Nature, Work as Play, which also described Watts' connections to the Beat movement. Some of Jacobs' work is back in print through Locust Music and Important Records. The bulk of his master tapes were destroyed by fire in 1995, though 63 reel-to-reel tapes were rediscovered by Jack Dangers who released a portion of the material in collaboration with Jacobs in 2005.

Henry Jacobs co-stars, together with architect Daniel B-H Liebermann, in Frederik Carbon's documentary feature Sunnyside (2017).

== Personal life ==
Jacobs resided to the north of San Francisco, where he could avoid "electricity and cars." He had three children, practiced Qigong, and was a fervent appreciator of ping-pong and Afro-Cuban music.

== Discography ==
The following is a partial discography:

- Interview with Dr. Sholem Stein on the Origins of Calypso, KPFA
- Shorty Petterstein Interview, KPFA
- Radio Programme No 1 Audio Collage: Henry Jacobs’ Music and Folklore (Folkways, 1955)
- Two Interviews (Fantasy, 1955)
- Interviews of Our Times (Fantasy, 1955)
- "Sonata For Loudspeakers (Tape Loops Demo)" (1953-4). On album: "Sounds of New Music" (Folkways, 1957)
- The Weird Wide World of Shorty Petterstein (World Pacific, 1957)
- Highlights of Vortex (Folkways, 1959)
- Sounds of New Music (Folkways, 1962)
- The Laughing String (MEA, 1963)
- The Wide Weird World of Henry Jacobs/The Fine Art of Goofing Off (Important Records, 2005)
- Around the World with Henry Jacobs (Important)
