= Cat's Cradle (film) =

1959 film by Stan Brakhage

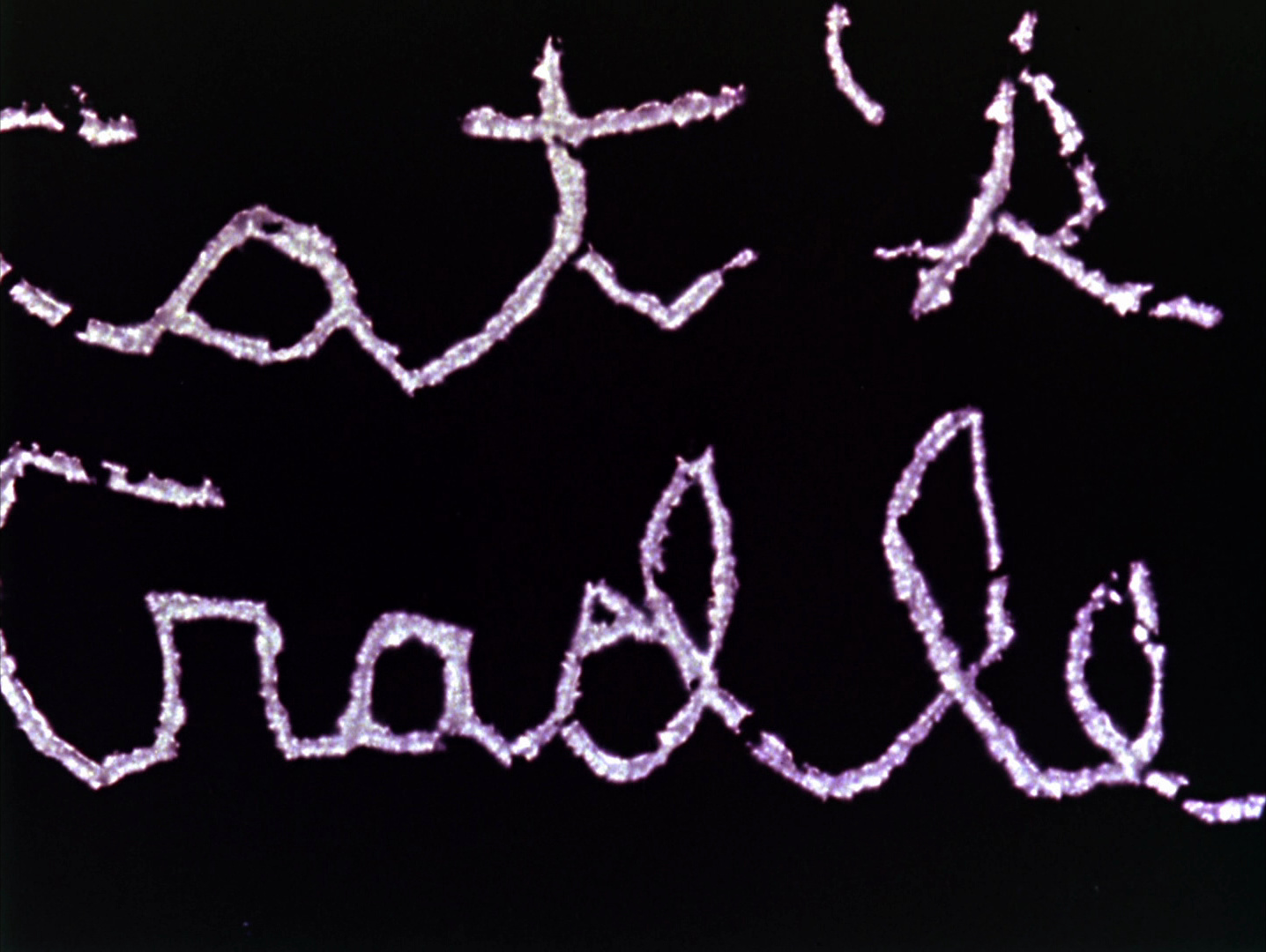
- Directed by: Stan Brakhage
- Starring: Stan Brakhage; Jane Brakhage; James Tenney; Carolee Schneemann
- Release date: 1959
- Running time: 6 minutes
- Country: United States
- Language: English

Cat's Cradle is an experimental short film by Stan Brakhage, produced in 1959. The film was described by Brakhage as "sexual witchcraft involving two couples and a 'medium' cat."

== Production ==
Stan Brakhage in Cat's Cradle.

Cat's Cradle was filmed in Princeton, New Jersey. The film features Stan Brakhage and his wife Jane, as well as composer James Tenney and visual artist Carolee Schneemann. Schneemann, who appeared in several Brakhage films, wore an apron at Brakhage's insistence. Despite her friendship with Brakhage, she later described the experience as "frightening," remarking that "whenever I collaborated, went into a male friend's film, I always thought I would be able to hold my presence, maintain an authenticity. It was soon gone, lost in their celluloid dominance--a terrifying experience--experiences of true dissolution."

The entirely silent film was described by Brakhage as "sexual witchcraft involving two couples and a 'medium' cat." The film features shots of the naked bodies that are, according to writer Walter Metz, "edited in such a way that very little narrative sense can be immediately gleaned from them. As the film wears on, however, it becomes clear that the viewer is witnessing some form of domestic conflict and the intimacy that follows (or perhaps precedes) it." The editing style includes very brief "flash-frames" that interrupt longer shots, a technique that Brakhage would continue to use in such films as Tortured Dust (1984).

== Reception ==
Paul Arthur, in his essay for The Criterion Collection, wrote that Cat's Cradle "does not entirely suppress our recourse to naming but rather floods our typical eye-brain loop with stimuli for which attached language cues are either less than automatic or, in cases of purely sensory appeal, non-existent." Fred Camper, in another essay for The Criterion Collection, remarked upon the mysteriousness of the four characters' interactions, but was nevertheless "kept on edge by the very rapid intercutting... the viewer is at once encouraged to come up with his own interpretations and prevented from settling on any one idea."

== Preservation ==
The Academy Film Archive preserved Cat's Cradle in 2006.

== See also ==
- List of American films of 1959
- List of avant-garde films of the 1950s
