= Hurlements en faveur de Sade =

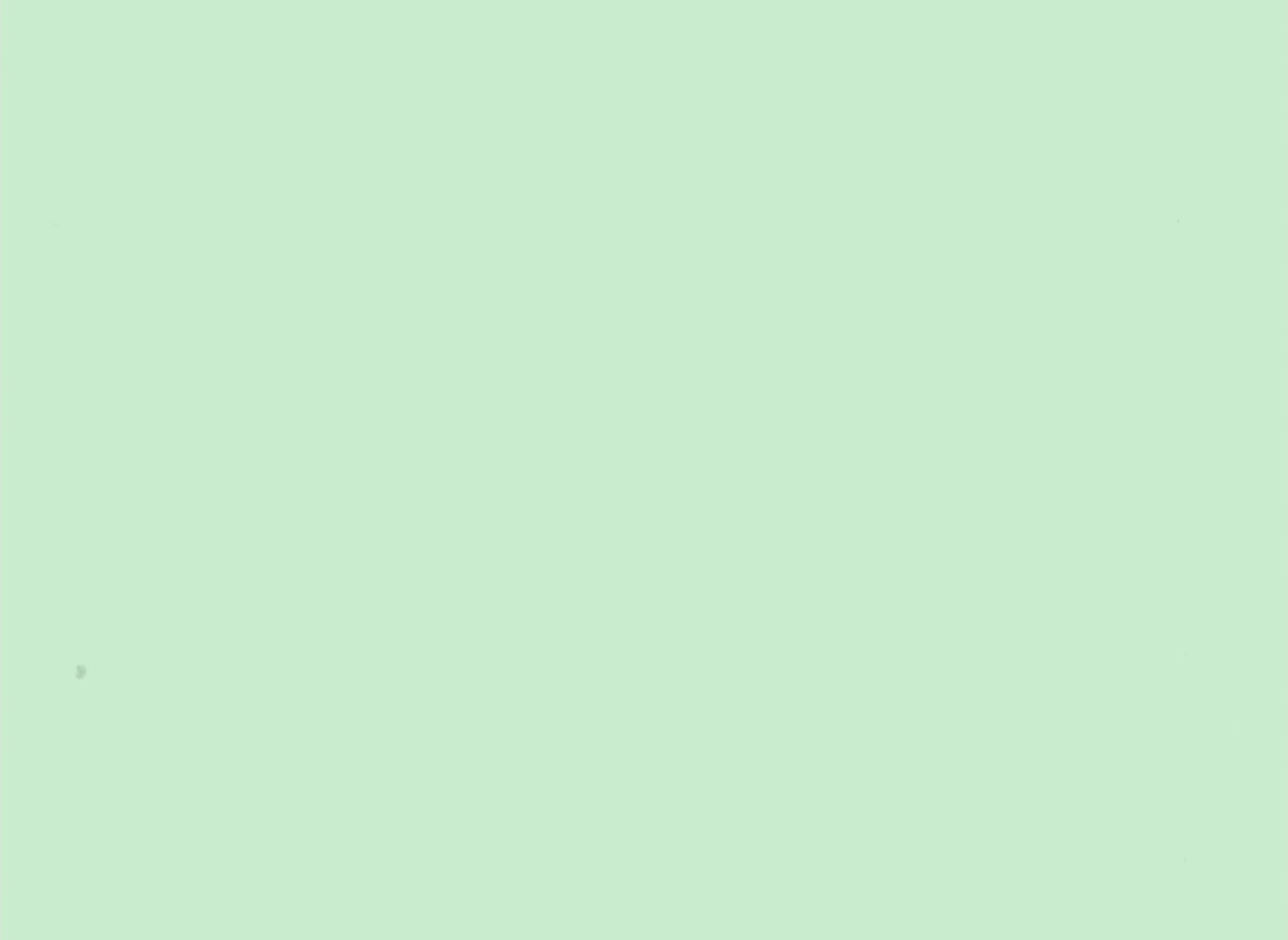
- Hurlements en faveur de Sade is a film resolutely devoid of any image at all, the screen remaining totally white, or totally black, depending on the sequence.
- Directed by: Guy Debord
- Written by: Guy Debord
- Release date: 30 June 1952
- Running time: 80 minutes
- Country: France
- Language: French

Hurlements en faveur de Sade (English: Howlings for Sade) is a 1952 French avant-garde film directed by Guy Debord. Devoid of any images, the film was an early work of Lettrist cinema.

== Description ==
The image track of Hurlements en faveur de Sade contains no actual images, only solid white or solid black frames. It follows the sound track such that when there is speech the screen is white, and when there is silence the screen is black.

The sound track uses text détourned from Isidore Isou's book Esthétique du cinéma, John Ford's film Rio Grande, work by James Joyce, and the French Civil Code. The time between speeches becomes increasingly long throughout the film, and it ends with a 24-minute sequence of silence and darkness.

== Production ==
Debord wrote the original script for Hurlements en faveur de Sade during the winter of 1951–1952. His notes outlined a combination of original scenes and found footage. Debord planned to use newsreel footage, images of himself and other Lettrists, painted film stock, and sequences of solid black. For the film's soundtrack, his notes included Lettrist poetry, text by Guillaume Apollinaire, and music by Antonio Vivaldi. In April 1952 Debord published his original scenario in Ion magazine along with a preface titled "Prolégomènes à tout cinéma futur" (English: "Prolegomena to Any Future Cinema"), Likely as a reference to Immanuel Kant's 'Prolegomena to Any Future Metaphysics'

Debord abandoned most of his original plan for the film and instead used no images at all. He used speeches delivered by himself, Gil J. Wolman, Isidore Isou, Serge Berna, and Barbara Rosenthal.

== Release ==
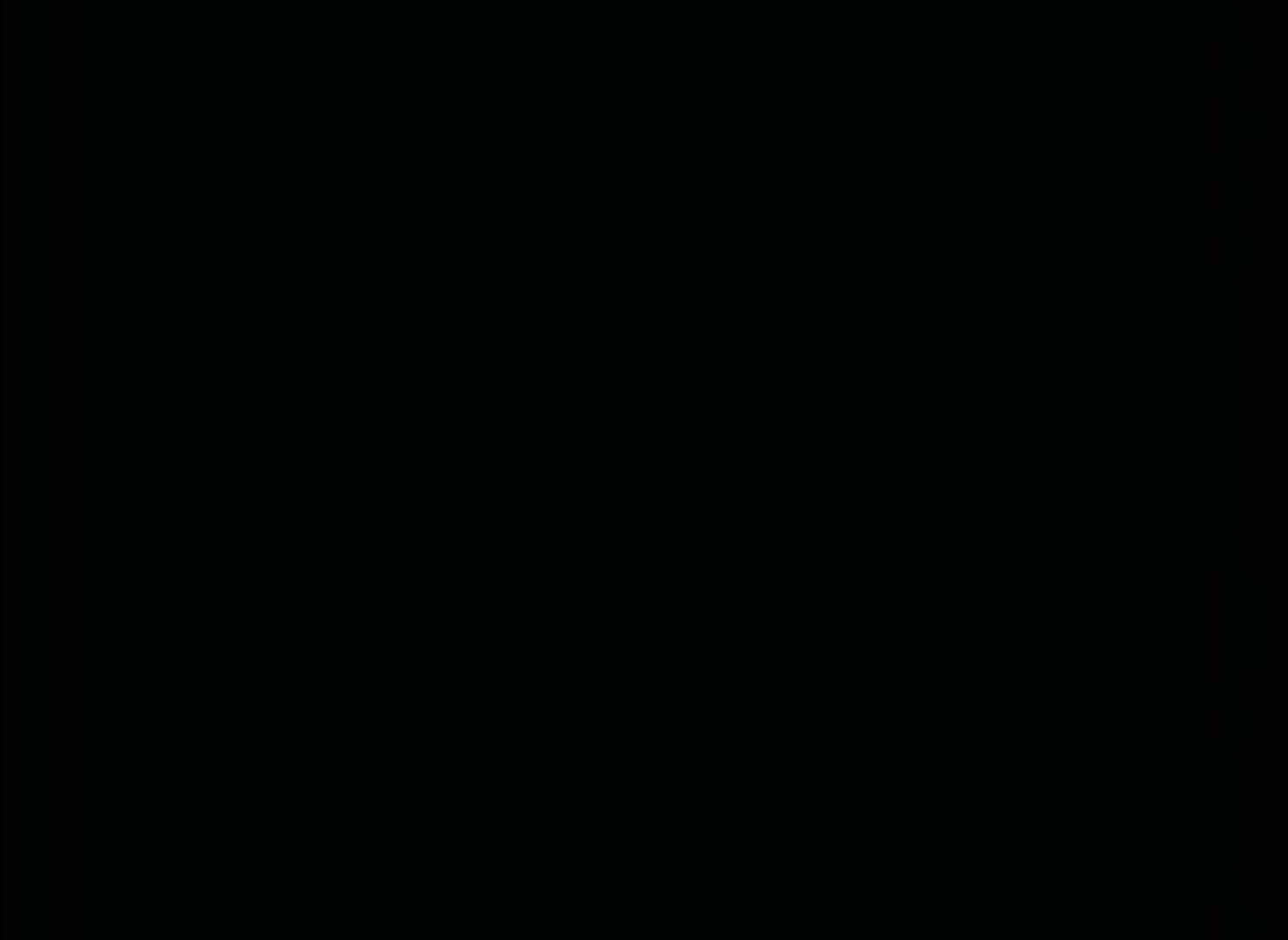
Spectators at the premiere were not able to see the final 24-minute sequence, consisting of a mere black screen without any soundtrack.

Hurlements en faveur de Sade premiered 30 June 1952 at the Ciné-Club Avant-Garde 52 in the Musée de l'Homme. The audience became unruly, and the screening was stopped after twenty minutes.

The film had its UK premiere in 1957 at the Institute of Contemporary Arts in London.

== See also ==
- List of avant-garde films of the 1950s
