= T. Arthur Cottam =

American film director and screenwriter

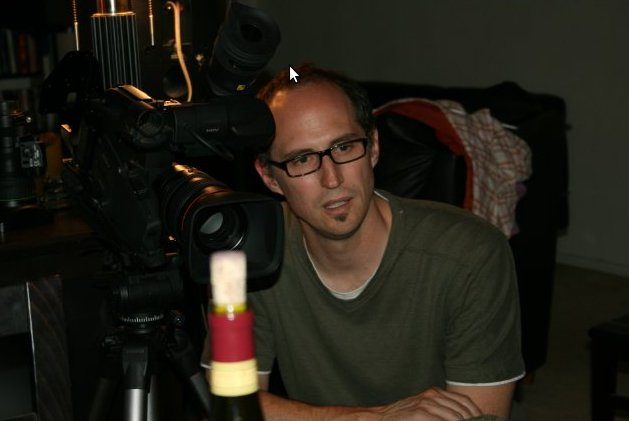
- Cottam on set of film Objects in 2010
- Occupations: Film director, screenwriter, and producer
- Website: www.misfitfilms.com

T. Arthur Cottam is a screenwriter, actor, producer and film director. A graduate of the Film and Television Production program at the Tisch School of the Arts of New York University, Cottam resides in Los Angeles, California. He acted in theatre, and received an Artistic Director Achievement Award from the Valley Theatre League for his role in the theatre production Othello, an alternative mashup adaptation, created and directed by Josh T. Ryan. Cottam directed short films along a topical series called "Dirty Little Shorts".

His existential work Pornographic Apathetic deals with four people recounting pornographic film dialog in a state of apathy. Pornographic Apathetic was featured in numerous movie festivals, and received eight film awards as well as critical acclaim. Cottam's film Carbuncle was featured in 2006 at the Milano Film Festival in Italy, and was recognized with a nomination in the category of "Best Feature Film". His 2006 film Filthy Food received the award for "Best Experimental Short Film" at the festival CineKink NYC. Cottam's film 52 Takes of the Same Thing, Then Boobs was an entrant in the 2010 International Short Film Festival in Piombino, Italy, and was featured in AFI FEST in the same year.

== Education ==
Cottam graduated from the Film and Television Production program at the Tisch School of the Arts of New York University. Cottam's thesis work at NYU was titled Beer Goggles, the film received the Best Editing award at the First Run Film Festival and was featured at the Chicago and New York Underground Film Festivals. He received a Bachelor of Fine Arts degree from NYU in 1998.

== Career ==
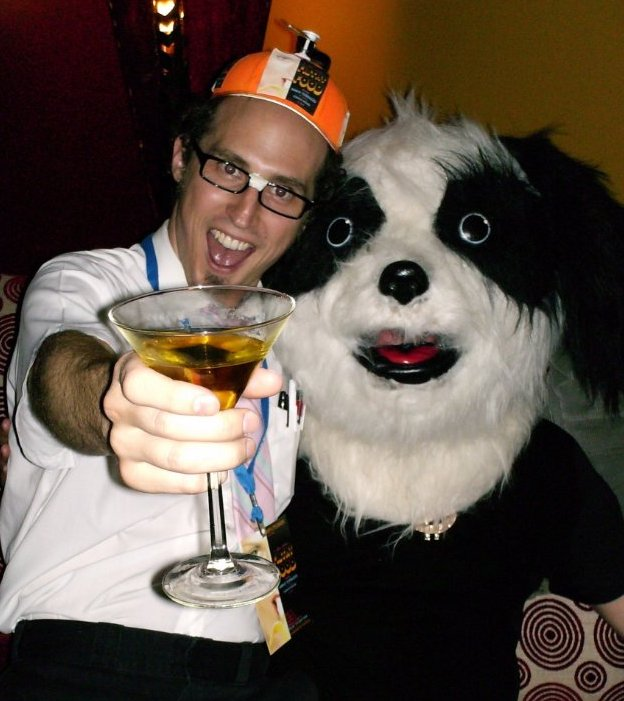
T. Arthur Cottam at the Florida Film Festival (2007)

T. Arthur Cottam is an actor, and film-maker, based in Los Angeles, California. Cottam was a member of Zombie Joe's Underground Theatre Group, and performed along with co-founder, Josh T. Ryan, and actors Denise Devin, Bernadette Larsen, and Zombie Joe, in 2000 for a series of productions titled "Sketches 7: Bury the Hatchet", directed and created by Josh T. Ryan and Zombie Joe. He continued performing in theatre in Los Angeles in 2001. In 2002, Cottam received an Artistic Director Achievement Award from the Valley Theatre League for his role in the theatre production Othello created and directed by Josh T. Ryan. Cottam's short films were produced along a topical series titled, "Dirty Little Shorts". His film Pornographic Apathetic debuted in 2002. The existential plot features four individuals (two women and two men) who recreate dialog from pornographic film while in a state of apathy. Pornographic Apathetic garnered eight film awards, and was featured at more than 50 film festivals.

Pornographic Apathetic received positive reception from journalist Gary Dowell of The Dallas Morning News, who described it as "Especially notable ... an experimental work that strips the mystique from porn". Pornographic Apathetic was selected for inclusion in the Puchon International Fantastic Festival (PiFan) in South Korea; the festival "aims to identify the important elements of fantastic films, such as creativity and popularity". The movie was shown at the Paris Porn Film Fest at the Le Brady cinema, in Paris, France. The film was featured in an exhibit in Vienna, examining the nature of pornography. Writing for San Antonio Express-News, Mike Greenberg observed, "T. Arthur Cottam's Pornographic Apathetic is just about the funniest thing I've ever seen. (The excellent actors are mostly clothed, never touch each other and are nearly motionless, but the dialogue is not suitable for children or bluenoses.)" The film was given a favorable review by reporter Robert W. Butler of The Kansas City Star who covered the piece during its presentation at the Kansas City Filmmakers Jubilee. Butler wrote, "Your ears will burn while watching T. Arthur Cottam's superlative satiric essay on the desensitizing effects of pornography, but you'll also be laughing. ... It's lurid. It's raunchy. It's vile. But all this nasty lubricity is delivered deadpan, a device that deconstructs the whole intention of porn." Marc Mohan reviewed the film during its feature at the Portland International Short Short Film Festival, and wrote that it "makes the most of its one-joke premise". In 2007, The Orlando Sentinel characterized Cottam as a favorite film-maker at the Florida Film Festival. Los Angeles Times journalist Borzou Daragahi cited the film as an example of problems with the adult film industry in an article about a sexual art exhibit; he commented, "The piece makes you laugh while illustrating one of the paradoxes of smut: At its core, it's rather idiotic and boring."

In 2006, Cottam's film Carbuncle competed at the Milano Film Festival, alongside another U.S. film titled The Blood of my Brother by Andrei Berends. Carbuncle received a nomination in the category of "Best Feature Film" at the Milan Film Festival. Cottam's 2006 film Filthy Food was featured in the San Francisco Underground Short Film Festival, and received the award for "Best Experimental Short Film" at the festival CineKink NYC. In 2010, Cottam's film 52 Takes of the Same Thing, Then Boobs was an entrant in the International Short Film Festival in Piombino, Italy. It was featured in a section of the International Short Film Festival which included selections of films that were considered "visionary" and contributed a "visual impact" to cinema. 52 Takes of the Same Thing, Then Boobs was featured in AFI FEST 2010, where Lane Kneedler associate director of programming called it "the most outrageously 'out there' film that we have scheduled". In an interview with Girami, Cottam stated he had intended to direct a feature-length film for some time, and wanted to combine his talents with actors who could improvise in front of the camera. Cottam said he had a great experience working with the actors on the film Carbuncle, and stated he let improvisation be the tool by which the actors could show emotions and create their characters. In September 2010, 52 Takes of the Same Thing, Then Boobs was shown at the Black Rock City Film Festival located at the Burning Man site in the Nevada desert.

== Filmography ==
=== Film ===
Year	Film	Role
2002	Between Us	Director, producer, cinematographer, writer
2002	Beer Goggles	Director, producer, writer
2002	Pornographic Apathetic	Director, producer, cinematographer
2006	Carbuncle	Director, executive producer, cinematographer, writer, actor: "Director", Composer
2006	Filthy Food	Director, producer, cinematographer, writer
2008	Dirty Words: The Letter C	Director, writer, actor
2008	Je dis non, Ali	Co-producer, Cinematographer, Actor: "Le Jongleur"
2010	52 Takes of the Same Thing, Then Boobs	Director, executive producer, cinematographer, writer
2012	Laser Blasters	Director, producer
2012	Objects	Director, producer, cinematographer, writer
2013	Pollywogs	Co-director, Co-producer, Story
2013	The Human Race	Actor

=== Theatre ===
Year	Production	Organization	Role
2002	Othello	Zombie Joe's Underground	Actor

== Awards and nominations ==
Year	Award	Organization	Work	Category	Result
2002	Artistic Director Achievement Award	Valley Theatre League	Othello; Zombie Joe's Underground	Lead Actor, play, comedy	Won
2002	Best in film	First Run Film Festival	Beer Goggles	Best editing	Won
2002	Christopher Wetzel Award	Gene Siskel Film Center	Pornographic Apathetic	Independent Film Comedy	Won
2003	Best in film	Milano Film Festival	Pornographic Apathetic	Best Short Film	Won
2003	Bunny Award	Boston Underground Film Festival	Pornographic Apathetic	Most Effectively Offensive	Won
2004	10 Degrees Hotter Award	Valley Film Festival	Pornographic Apathetic	Best Short Film, Jury Award	Won
2004	Audience Award	Brooklyn International Film Festival	Pornographic Apathetic	Best Experimental	Won
2006	Best in Film	Milan Film Festival	Carbuncle	Best Feature Film	Won

== Arrest ==
On November 9th 2026, Cottam was arrested on suspicion of arranging to meet a minor. However, due to insufficient evidence, Los Angeles County District Attorney's Office did not charge him.

== See also ==
- 2002 New York Underground Film Festival
- 2003 New York Underground Film Festival
- Akira Kurosawa Memorial Short Film Competition
- Cinematography
- Directorial debut
- Filmmaking
- List of directorial debuts
- List of film and television directors
