= The End (1953 film) =

1953 American short film by Christopher Maclaine

- Directed by: Christopher Maclaine
- Narrated by: Christopher Maclaine
- Cinematography: Jordan Belson
- Distributed by: Kinesis
- Release date: October 23, 1953
- Running time: 35 minutes
- Country: United States
- Language: English

The End is a 1953 American short film directed and narrated by Christopher Maclaine. It tells the stories of six people on the last day of their lives. It premiered at the San Francisco Museum of Modern Art as part of Frank Stauffacher's Art in Cinema series. Though the film met audience disapproval at its premiere, it was praised by critics as a "masterpiece" and "a great work of art".

== Plot ==
The film is divided into six sections, each telling the story of a different character. After being shunned by his friends, Walter runs through the city until a man arbitrarily decides to shoot him. Charles, having just killed his landlady and her 7-year-old daughter, wanders through the city before arriving at the Golden Gate Bridge, where he jumps to his death. John, a comedian, performs a funny routine about killing himself before going home and committing suicide.

The beautiful young poet Paul goes to a leper colony to find a lover and see if he can still be loved after contracting leprosy himself. The fifth section shows a series of images set to Beethoven's 9th, and the narrator asks the viewer to write the story. In the final story, two people meet on the beach and play, when a bomb falls from the sky and detonates.

== Production ==
Frank Stauffacher helped secure funding for The End, much of which came from Bob Greensfelder of the Kinesis Film Society. Jordan Belson (who later became known for his own meditative works) served as the film's cameraman, shooting on inexpensive Kodachrome stock. The collaboration between him and Maclaine was marked by frequent conflict. Belson was upset that Maclaine would show up intoxicated in the middle of the night to give photographic directions for their shoots. Much of the film was improvised, including Maclaine's narration.

== Release ==
The End premiered on October 23, 1953, at the San Francisco Museum of Modern Art, as part of Stauffacher's Art in Cinema series. Audience members booed the film, shouting over it and throwing their chairs. The film was distributed by Kinesis. When the company closed in 1957, Maclaine's work didn't find a new distributor up until 1962, when Stan Brakhage and Willard Morrison of the Audio Film Center brought it back into circulation.

The End is part of Anthology Film Archives' Essential Cinema Repertory collection. A transfer was made from Anthology's preservation negative print for the film's DVD release as part of Treasures IV: American Avant-Garde Film, 1947–1986.

== Reception and legacy ==
Critic P. Adams Sitney described The End as a "a deliberately conclusive work" that "mixes the prophecy of immediate doom with nostalgia, as if the earth were already gone". Fred Camper wrote in the Chicago Reader that it was "among the greatest films I've ever seen…[and] unlike any others I know". In his review in The Moving Image, Richard Suchenski called it "Maclaine's best film,…one of the definitive cinematic expressions of the Beat sensibility." Dennis Lim of the Los Angeles Times described The End as "some kind of masterpiece, a Beat-inflected vision of nuclear paranoia."

Brakhage, who attended the film's premiere, said that "in addition to being a great work of art…it is one of the most prophetic of our time." He cited it as an influence on his 1954 film Desistfilm.
