= Fuji (film) =

- Directed by: Robert Breer
- Release date: 1974
- Running time: 8 minutes
- Country: United States
- Language: None

Fuji is a 1974 American animated short film by Robert Breer.

== Summary ==
The film explores the director's artistic rendition of a train ride past Japan's Mount Fuji, using line drawings, rotoscope and live action.

== Reception and legacy ==
In 2002, Fuji was selected for preservation in the United States National Film Registry by the Library of Congress as being "culturally, historically, or aesthetically significant". It is part of Anthology Film Archives' Essential Cinema Repertory collection.

== See also ==
- Experimental film
- Bullet train
