= Window Water Baby Moving =

1959 film by Stan Brakhage

- Screenshot showing the cutting of the newborn's umbilical cord
- Directed by: Stan Brakhage
- Starring: Jane Brakhage (Jane Wodening); Myrrena Brakhage; Stan Brakhage
- Release date: 1959
- Running time: 12 minutes
- Country: United States
- Language: Silent

Window Water Baby Moving is an experimental short film by Stan Brakhage, filmed in November 1958 and released in 1959. The film documents the birth of the director's first child, his daughter Myrrena, by his then-wife Jane Brakhage, later known as Jane Wodening.

== Production ==
Stan Brakhage's wife, Jane, had insisted that Brakhage be present at the birth of their daughter; however, Brakhage felt he would faint if he weren't focused on filming the event. The hospital initially gave permission for filming, but this was later reneged. Instead, Brakhage transferred the birth to their home, hiring a nurse and some expensive emergency equipment. Jane was originally "very, very shy" about being filmed, but eventually relented after Brakhage made "a big dramatic scene and said 'All right, let's forget it!'" Most of the film was photographed by Brakhage himself, but Jane occasionally took the camera to capture her husband's reactions. Jane Brakhage later recalled of the birth:

He [Brakhage] calls the hospital and gets the nurse who says she'll be right there... Stan starts worrying. I continue roaring and panting. Stan stops filming he's so upset. He gets nervous. He tells me to relax and pant. He needs to relax; I'm doing fine. I tell him how much I love him and ask him if he's got my face while I'm roaring and this sets him off again and reassures him, and he clickety-clackety-buzzes while I roar and pant.

Editing of Window Water Baby Moving took place in the evenings over several months. According to Brakhage, a further delay was caused when Kodak seized the film. Brakhage described the event thus: "When I sent in the film to be processed, Kodak sent a page that said, more or less, 'Sign this at the bottom, and we will destroy this film; otherwise, we will turn it over to police.' So then the doctor wrote a letter, and we got the footage back." Brakhage later felt that Window Water Baby Moving had insufficiently captured his emotions at the birth of his child, and, during the birth of his third child, he filmed Thigh Line Lyre Triangular (1961) as an improvement.

== Reception ==
Window Water Baby Moving was often screened on a double-bill with George C. Stoney's 1953 educational film, All My Babies. Brakhage was worried that his film's frank depiction of childbirth would embroil him in legal trouble, remarking "you could definitely go to jail for showing not only sexuality but nudity of any kind - though the idea of childbirth being somehow pornographic has always been offensive and disgusting to me." Brakhage once claimed to have almost died after a screening of the film in South Dakota, saying "they shot at me because they felt I had insulted their wives."

Nevertheless, Window Water Baby Moving has become one of Brakhage's best-known works. Critic Archer Winsten described the film as being "so forthright, so full of primitive wonder and love, so far beyond civilization in its acceptance that it becomes an experience like few in the history of movies." Scott MacDonald credited Window Water Baby Moving with making delivery rooms more accessible to fathers, a view with which Brakhage concurred.

== Preservation ==
The Academy Film Archive preserved Window Water Baby Moving in 2013.

== See also ==
- List of American films of 1959
- List of avant-garde films of the 1950s
