= Une femme coquette =

- Directed by: Jean-Luc Godard
- Screenplay by: Jean-Luc Godard
- Based on: Le Signe by Guy de Maupassant
- Starring: Maria Lysandre; Roland Tolma
- Cinematography: Jean-Luc Godard
- Edited by: Jean-Luc Godard
- Release date: 1955
- Running time: 9 minutes
- Country: France
- Language: French

Une femme coquette (A Flirtatious Woman) (1955) was the first of four short fiction films made by French filmmaker Jean-Luc Godard preceding his work in feature-length narrative film.

The short film is based on the story Le Signe (The Signal) by Guy de Maupassant. It is a nine-minute story of a woman who decides to copy the gesture she has seen a prostitute make to passing men. Then a young man, played by Roland Tolmatchoff, responds. In Maupassant's original tale the scene takes place indoors, the woman having signaled from her window, but in Godard's revision the characters meet by a bench on the Ile Rousseau in Geneva.

== Cast ==
- Maria Lysandre as The Woman
- Roland Tolma as The Man

== Film data ==
- Runtime: 9 min
- Country: France
- Language: French
- Color: Black and White

== See also ==
- List of avant-garde films of the 1950s
- La boulangère de Monceau (also known as The Bakery Girl of Monceau) (1963) by Éric Rohmer
