= Allures (film) =

1961 film

- Directed by: Jordan Belson
- Release date: 1961
- Running time: 8 minutes
- Country: United States
- Language: English

Allures is a 1961 American 16mm abstract short film directed by Jordan Belson.

== Summary ==
Using an evocative combination of sound and light effects, the film has been described by Belson as the "space-iest film that had been done until then", creating "a feeling of moving into the void".

== Legacy ==
In 2011, the experimental film was selected for preservation in the National Film Registry by the Library of Congress.

== See also ==
- 1961 in film
- Special effects
