= Christopher Maclaine =

American filmmaker (1923–1975)

- Born: Clifford Vernard McClain; July 27, 1923; Wapanucka, Oklahoma
- Died: April 6, 1975 (aged 51); Fairfield, California
- Occupations: Poet, filmmaker
- Years active: 1946–1960
- Notable work: The End

Christopher Maclaine (born Clifford Vernard McClain; July 27, 1923 – April 6, 1975) was an American poet and filmmaker.

== Early life ==
Maclaine was born July 27, 1923, in Wapanucka, Oklahoma. His family was of Scottish descent. He attended the University of California, Berkeley, graduating in 1946 with a bachelor's degree in Spanish. He began a graduate program in English but left after one semester.

== Career ==
After leaving UC Berkeley, Maclaine started the literary magazine Contour with Norma Smith. Contour published four issues from 1947 to 1949. Maclaine completed his first film The End in 1953. Filmmaker Jordan Belson was the cameraman for the project. Their collaboration was marked by frequent conflict, with Belson upset that Maclaine would show up intoxicated in the middle of the night.

Maclaine began working with Belson on a second film, The Man Who Invented Gold. Maclaine played the main character, an alchemist whose neighbors believe him to be mad. Unwilling to tolerate Maclaine's behavior, Belson quit before the project was complete. Maclaine took over as cameraman and had two additional actors play the lead. The resulting film was disjointed, cutting between three different people playing the same character and alternating between black-and-white and color footage. Maclaine made two more short films, Beat and Scotch Hop.

== Later life ==
Kinesis, the distributor for Maclaine's films, closed and his films went out of circulation. His health deteriorated after he began to use methamphetamine in the late 1950s. He began to show signs of paranoia, which worsened after being sent to prison for possession of marijuana. Maclaine gave his films to Willard Morrison of the Audio Film Center to be preserved and distributed.

Maclaine suffered permanent brain damage and eventually was unable to recognize people he knew or care for himself. In 1969 he entered the Sunny Acres Convalescent Hospital in Fairfield. Morrison used the rental money from Maclaine's films taking care of him during his time in the hospital. Maclaine died there on April 6, 1975. His films are archived and preserved by Anthology Film Archives.
