= Thigh Line Lyre Triangular =

1961 film by Stan Brakhage

- Directed by: Stan Brakhage
- Starring: Jane Brakhage; Neowyn Brakhage
- Release date: 1961
- Running time: 5 minutes
- Country: United States
- Language: English

Thigh Line Lyre Triangular is an experimental short film by Stan Brakhage, released in 1961, which depicts the birth of the director's third child, a daughter named Neowyn. The film, which involves painting and hand-scratching over photographic images, is more abstract than the director's earlier Window Water Baby Moving, which documented the birth of Brakhage's first-born, a daughter named Myrrenna.

== Production ==
Stan Brakhage felt that Window Water Baby Moving had insufficiently captured his emotions at the birth of his child, and intended Thigh Line Lyre Triangular as an improvement.

Only at a crisis do I see both the sense as I've been trained to see it (that is, with Renaissance perspective, three-dimensional logic, colors as we've been trained to call a color a color, and so forth) and patterns that move straight out from the inside of the mind through the optic nerves - spots before my eyes, so to speak - and it's a very intensive, disturbing, but joyful experience. I've seen that every time a child was born .... Now none of that was in WINDOW WATER BABY MOVING; and I wanted a childbirth film which expressed all of my seeing at such a time.

Like many Brakhage works, Thigh Line Lyre Triangular is a silent film. Unlike Window Water Baby Moving, it was photographed in a hospital. The camera films Jane Brakhage's face and vulva from a low-angle shot near her feet. A layer of paint and deliberate scratches on the surface of the film render the birth itself almost unintelligible. Brakhage himself does not appear in the film, as he intended to "[centre] the occasion in my own eyes."

== Reception ==
Thigh Line Lyre Triangular is often contrasted against Brakhage's previous "birth film," Window Water Baby Moving. William R. Barr wrote that Thigh Line Lyre Triangular lacked the "urgency and intensity" of the earlier film, nevertheless describing it as "a layered, integrated affirmation of all creativity." Steven Dillon wrote that the film “attains the complexity of a lyrical poem by balancing subjective, painterly vision with emancipator, documentary effect.” R. Bruce Elder notes "the irony that [Brakhage], who had so vigorously rejected symbolism, resorted to using symbolism in Thigh Line Lyre Triangular.” James Peterson likened the film to the 1930s and 1940s art of Surrealist painter Joan Miró.
