= Hillerbrand+Magsamen =

Husband and wife collaborative visual art team

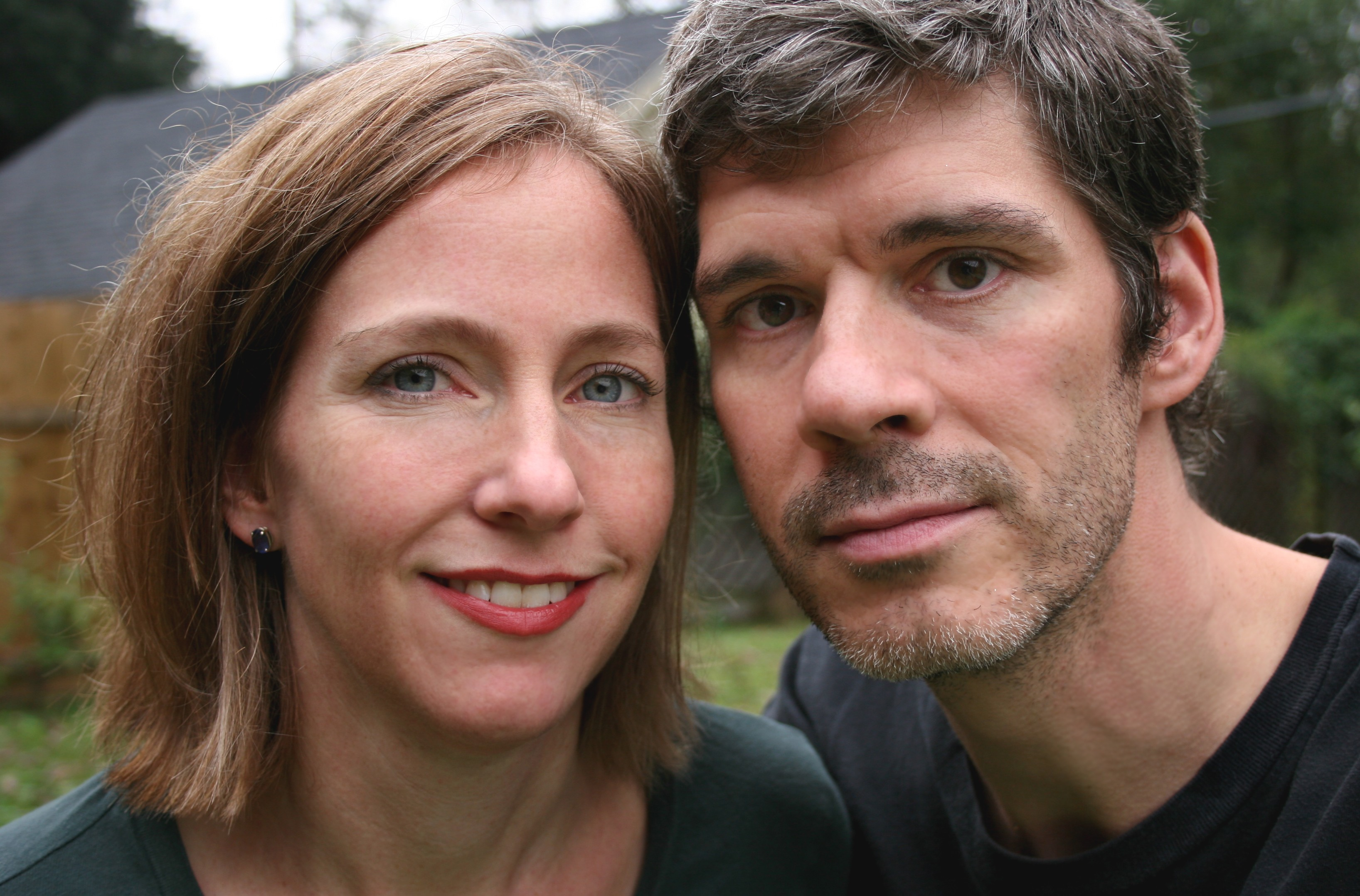
- Born: Denver, Colorado, USA and Durham, North Carolina, USA
- Education: Cranbrook Academy of Art, Bloomfield Hills, Michigan
- Awards: Fulbright Fellowship, Austin Film Society, Houston Arts Alliance
- Website: hillerbrandmagsamen.com

Hillerbrand+Magsamen is the collaborative husband and wife visual art team of Mary Magsamen and Stephan Hillerbrand. Through collaboration, Hillerbrand+Magsamen create sculpture, installation, performance, video, and photographic works to explore family identity, everyday interactions and consumer culture.

== Personal life ==
Mary Magsamen was the curator of Media and Film at Aurora Picture Show 2008–2022. Magsamen earned her BFA from the University of Denver and MFA from the Cranbrook Academy of Art.

Stephan Hillerbrand is currently a professor in the School of Art at the University of Houston. They currently live and work in Houston, Texas. They often include their two children in their work.

== Bio ==
The artists have presented their videos in international film and media festivals including SCOPE Basel, WAND V Stuttgarter Filmwinter, Taiwan International Video Art Exhibition, New York Underground Film Festival, Ann Arbor Film Festival, Brooklyn Underground Film Festival, LA Freewaves New Media Art Festival and Currents Media Festival. Their cinematic installations have also been seen in the Everson Museum of Art, the Cardiff International Festival of Photography by Ffotogallery, the Hudson River Museum, the Center for Photography at Woodstock, the Museum of Fine Arts, Houston, Blue Sky Gallery, and Houston Center for Photography.

Their work has been cited in publications such as The New York Times, Glasstire, The Houston Press, Culture Map, and television.

== Awards ==
- Cinespace, Houston Cinema Arts Festival (2015) 1st Place Winner, juried by Richard Linklater.
- The Sustainable Art Foundation (2015)
- Carol Crow Fellowship from the Houston Center for Photography in Houston, TX (2008)

== Notable works ==
- 'Higher Ground' is an interdisciplinary work consisting of video, sculpture and photography commissioned by the Houston Airport System and the City of Houston.
- 'Whole' is a single channel video that embarks on an epic adventure, this family creates new levels of interaction, communication and exploration by breaking and cutting holes into their actual home to make a habitrail-like environment where they go nowhere fast.
- 'House/hold' a series of 20 Archival Pigement Prints, 20"x28", Edition 1/3. The House/hold photograph series are portraits of our family that playfully capture slices of our daily life with surreal viewpoints and dark humor inspired by actual events from bath time to laundry.
- 'DIY Love' Seat is a playful single channel video that reinterprets our family and its identity. In this dark comedy a woman takes the family couch and cuts out a section with a chainsaw.

== Bibliography ==
- Madeline Schwartzman, See Yourself Sensing: Redefining Human Perception, Black Dog Publishing, June 28, 2011.ISBN 1-907317-29-5
