= Jack Stauffacher =

American printer, typographer, educator, and fine book publisher

- Born: Jack Werner Stauffacher; December 19, 1920; San Francisco, California, United States
- Died: November 16, 2017 (aged 96); Tiburon, California, United States
- Known for: Master printmaker, typography, small book publishing, educator
- Relatives: Frank Stauffacher

Jack Werner Stauffacher (December 19, 1920 – November 16, 2017) was an American printer, typographer, educator, and fine book publisher. He owned and operated Greenwood Press, a small book printing press based in the San Francisco Bay Area.

He taught classes in design, typography, and printmaking at Carnegie Mellon University, Stanford University, University of California, Santa Cruz, and San Francisco Art Institute.

== Biography ==
Stauffacher was born in San Francisco, California, in 1920, and he grew up in nearby San Mateo, California. His father Frank A. Stauffacher was a plumber, and his mother was Elsa R. Stauffacher. His brother, Frank Stauffacher, was a filmmaker and ran the pioneering Art in Cinema series at the San Francisco Museum of Modern Art from 1946 to 1954. His sister in law was designer Barbara Stauffacher Solomon.

At the age of 13, he established the Greenwood Press. The press was named after the street on which it was located, in a small building that he and his father built behind the family home in San Mateo, California. His first printed book appeared in 1941 when he was 20 years old, Washington Irving's "Three Choice Sketches By Geoffrey Crayon, Gent" based on The Sketch Book of Geoffrey Crayon, Gent..

In 1955, he received a Fulbright grant for three years of study in Florence, Italy, and decided to close Greenwood Press. There he met master printers Giovanni Mardersteig and Alberto Tallone, whose work and ideas influenced him profoundly.

After his return to the United States, he became assistant professor of typographic design at Carnegie Mellon University and his work led to the formation of the New Laboratory Press. He went on to become typographic director at Stanford University Press and to teach at the San Francisco Art Institute (SFAI), and University of California, Santa Cruz. One of his former students was artist Tom Killion.

In 1966, he reopened the Greenwood Press in a building at 300 Broadway in the North Beach neighborhood of San Francisco and resumed producing books and limited editions such as Albert Camus and the Men of Stone (1971). In 1967, he was commissioned to redesign the Journal of Typographic Research, later renamed Visible Language. The typographic composition he used for its cover was used for many years.

Stauffacher was added to the distinguished list of AIGA medalists in 2004.

Several of his experimental compositions using wood and metal type are in the permanent collections of the San Francisco Museum of Modern Art (SFMOMA), the Stanford University Library, and the Los Angeles County Museum of Art (LACMA). He was the subject of an article and his work featured on the cover of the groundbreaking Emigre magazine in 1998.

== Publications ==
=== Biography ===
Much of his life and work is documented in the book A Typographic Journey: The History of the Greenwood Press (1999) published as a limited edition book by the Book Club of California.

- Stauffacher, Jack Werner; Humphreys, Glenn (1999). A Typographic Journey: The History of the Greenwood Press. Book Club of California. ASIN B0006R91CK.
- Walker, Franklin; Stauffacher, Jack Werner (1966). The Seacoast of Bohemia: An Account of Early Carmel. Book Club of California. ASIN B0006BPFU8.

=== Greenwood Press publications ===
- Phaidros: A Search for the Typographic Form of Plato's Phaedrus (1 ed.). San Francisco, California: Greenwood Press. 1978.
- Three Choice Sketches (1 ed.). San Mateo, California: Greenwood Press. 1941. pp. Text and display handset in ATF Garamond, printed on Strathmore Book paper, bound in cloth.

=== Art exhibition related ===
- Wooden Letters from 300 Broadway. School of Art and Design, San Jose State University (SJSU). 1999.

== Exhibitions ==
This is a list of select exhibition of Jack Stauffacher.

- 2019 – Between the Lines: Typography in LACMA's Collection (group exhibition), Los Angeles County Museum of Art (LACMA), Los Angeles, California
- 2013 – Stauffacher and (Donald) Judd (group exhibition), Los Angeles County Museum of Art (LACMA), Los Angeles, California
- 2011 – Arch: A Book Project by Holly Downing and Jack Stauffacher (group exhibition), Graham Foundation and Festival of the Architecture Book, Chicago, Illinois
- 2008-2009 – 246 and Counting, Recent Architecture + Design Acquisitions, San Francisco Museum of Modern Art (SFMOMA), San Francisco, California
- 2004-2005 – Belles Lettres: The Art of Typography (group exhibition), San Francisco Museum of Modern Art, San Francisco, California
- 2002 – Jack Stauffacher: Selections from the Permanent Collection of Architecture and Design (solo exhibition), San Francisco Museum of Modern Art, San Francisco, California

== Awards ==
- 1955, Fulbright grant
- 2004, AIGA Medal

== Death and legacy ==
Stauffacher died at home in Tiburon, California, in November 2017, at the age of 96.

His work was the subject of a short biographical documentary film by filmmaker Jim Faris, Jack Stauffacher, Printer (2002).

== See also ==
- Stanford University Press
