= Joe Sola =

American video artist

- Born: June 16, 1966; Chicago, Illinois, U.S.
- Education: University of Michigan; Otis College of Art and Design
- Known for: Video
- Website: Official website

Joe Sola (born June 16, 1966) is a contemporary artist who lives and works in Los Angeles, California. He is known for his satirical video works, most notably Studio Visit (2005) and Saint Henry Composition (2001), unique exhibition installations such as A Painted Horse by Joe Sola (with Matthew Chambers, Sayre Gomez, Rudy K. Slobeck, and others), (2015) and Portraits: an exhibition in Tif Sigfrids’ ear (2013), as well as his collaborative performances with composer Michael Webster.

== Life and education ==
Sola was born in Chicago, Illinois in 1966. He studied American Literature at University of Michigan in Ann Arbor, Michigan, graduating with a B.A. in 1989. He went on to study at Otis College of Art and Design, Los Angeles, California, receiving his M.F.A in 1999.

== Work ==
Sola's works flirt with disaster. Working with video, painting, installation and performance, Sola's practice merges the absurd with cultural critique, referencing both high and low culture found in Hollywood, German philosophy, adult entertainment, and art history. His works, which often use cinematic imagery, question notions of authenticity and aspects of masculinity within contemporary society, prompting viewers to “consider the impact popular culture has on our contemporary psyche".

Using himself, other artists, non-artists, high school football players, professional actors, bodybuilders and models, Sola muddles the boundaries between conceptual art, Hollywood film, performance and social experiment. Such examples include: Employing car salesmen to sell his paintings at an art fair (Car Salesmen Selling my Paintings at Art Los Angeles Contemporary Art Fair, 2015); Getting tackled by high school football players (Saint Henry Composition, 2001); Explaining his drawings to escorts (Talking about my Drawings with Escorts, 2010); Inviting film actors to make conceptual art (Film Actors Make Conceptual Art, 2005); Installing miniature paintings into his dealer's ear (Portraits: an Exhibition in Tif Sigfrids’ Ear, 2013). In 2014, he turned his art gallery into a collectors dining room and hung abstract paintings by contemporary artists on the walls. For Sola's contribution he painted an abstract pattern on a miniature horse and allowed the horse to roam free in the gallery during business hours. For his contribution to the 2002 California Biennial Sola contributed a short documentary video of a ride over the climax of a roller coaster with leading professional actors from the gay adult film industry (Riding with adult video performers, 2002).

Studio Visit

In one of his earlier works, Studio Visit (2005) captures the vulnerability of hosting studio visits. In this piece Sola invites guests to discuss recent artworks and exhibitions, at one point asking them if they would like to see a new performance he does in the studio. He mentions that what they are about to see is art, and then unexpectedly jumps through the window. The onlookers stay seated, stunned, then get up to check if the artist is still alive, while others laugh, realizing the hilarity of it all. Referencing both Yves Klein's Leap into the Void (1960) and Hollywood action films, the short 8-minute video reflects Sola's engagement with Hollywood while also capturing the vulnerability of being an artist and the struggle to communicate with words during a studio visit.

Portraits: an exhibition in Tif Sigfrids' ear

In 2013, Sola presented Portraits: an exhibition in Tif Sigfrids’ ear, the first of several exhibitions the artist made with the gallery over the course of several years. For this exhibition Sola created six miniature oil paintings using a stereo microscope and a .12-millimeter acupuncture needle. Measuring 4/64 - 5/64 inches, the paintings were installed within a miniature white box gallery, which the gallerist then displayed within her ear for the duration of the exhibition. The entire space of the gallery remained empty, except for the gallerist sitting at her desk. The exhibition earned notable attention, cementing Sola “among the savviest of today’s art-court jesters."

For his second exhibition at the gallery in 2014, Sola presented Painted Horse by Joe Sola (with Matthew Chambers, Sayre Gomez, Rudy K. Slobeck, and others). Turning the entire gallery into a fictional art collector's dining room, the exhibition included works by artists Matthew Chambers, Sayre Gomez, Rudy K. Slobeck as well as a miniature horse, Riba, which Sola painted in abstract shapes with pink, purple and yellow vegetable dye. The exhibition was said to provoke “dialogue about the economics of collecting”. In his 2016 exhibition Mertzbau: An Exhibition by Joe Sola Featuring Albert Mertz, 419 salvaged wooden chairs were installed within the small gallery. The chairs were stacked high so as to create three tunnels, and at the end of each one was a work by the artist Albert Mertz. Inspired by the artist Kurt Schwitters's grand work Merzbau (1937), the title serves as a play on references, captured in a quote by Schwitters that was displayed in the window of the gallery: “Being active in several different art forms was a matter of necessity for me as an artist. My goal with the ‘Merzkunst’ was the total work of art that comprises all other forms of art in one artistic unity.”

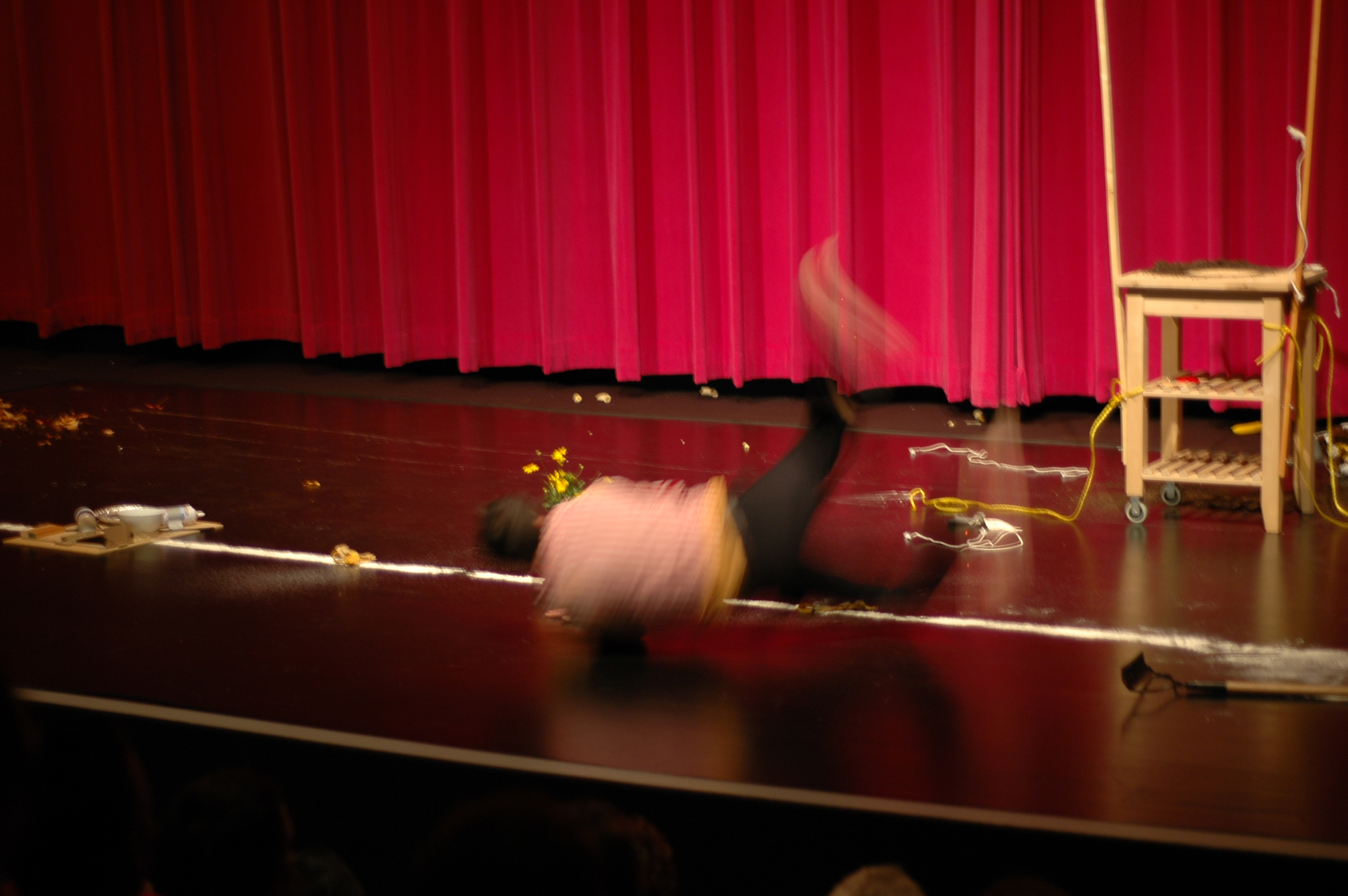
Joe Sola and Michael Webster performing as Shakey's at the Hammer Museum, Los Angeles.

Since 2006, Sola has also collaborated with composer Michael Webster as the duo Shakey's. The performances combine comedy, art historical critique and slapstick silent-movie gestures. They have been presented at art venues such as the Hammer Museum, Los Angeles Contemporary Exhibitions, as well as within self-enclosed installation that invited visitors to put their heads into peep-holes in order to see the show (Shakey’s Mining Adventure, 2007). In 2013, Sola presented Shakey's in 'Der Hintern in Der Luft at 356 Mission in Los Angeles. Dressed as vaudevillian restaurant servers, Sola danced, drew, sculpted, made a sandwich, threw a knife, then a hatchet, then an axe, started and extinguished a fire, culminating in Sola and Webster putting the entire show, including a large Laura Owens painting, through a 1000-pound woodchipper on stage.
