= Robert Breer =

American painter (1926–2011)

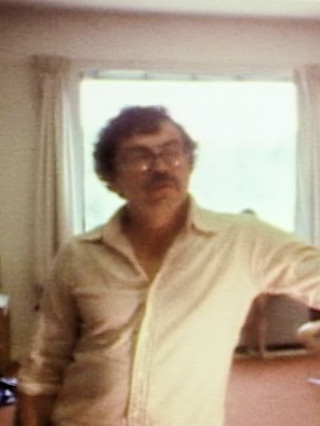
- Robert Breer in 1975
- Born: September 30, 1926; Detroit, Michigan
- Died: August 13, 2011 (aged 84); Tucson, Arizona
- Known for: Experimental film, Abstract painting, Sculpture
- Notable work: Floats
- Movement: Post-Modernism, Modernism

Robert Carlton Breer (September 30, 1926 – August 11, 2011) was an American experimental filmmaker, painter, and sculptor.

== Life and career ==
Born in 1926, Breer began his artistic career as a painter after studying at Stanford University and Paris. "A founding member of the American avant-garde," Breer was best known for his films, which combine abstract and representational painting, hand-drawn rotoscoping, original 16mm and 8mm film footage, photographs, and other materials.

After experimenting with cartoon animation as a child, he started making his first abstract experimental films while living in Paris from 1949 to 1959, a period during which he also showed paintings and kinetic sculptures at galleries such as the renowned Galerie Denise René.

Breer explained some of the reasons behind his move from painting to filmmaking in a 1976 interview:

This was 1950 or '51... I was having trouble with a concept, a very rigid notion about painting that I was interested in, that I was involved with, and that was the school of Mondrian. [...] The notion that everything had to be reduced to the bare minimum, put in its place and kept there. It seemed to me overly rigid since I could, at least once a week, arrive at a new 'absolute.' I had a feeling there was something there that suggested change as being a kind of absolute. So that's how I got into film.

— Robert Breer, transcription of Screening Room with Robert Breer (1976)

Breer also taught at Cooper Union in New York from 1971 to 2001. He received a Guggenheim Fellowship in 1978.

Breer died on August 11, 2011, at his home in Tucson.

== Influences ==
His aesthetic philosophy and technique were influenced by an earlier generation of abstract filmmakers that included Hans Richter, Viking Eggeling, Walter Ruttmann, and Fernand Léger, whose work he discovered while living in Europe. Breer was also influenced by the concept of Neo-plasticism as described by Piet Mondrian and Vasarely.

== Legacy ==
Scholarly publications on Breer's work and interviews with the artist can be found in Robert Breer, A Critical Cinema 2: Interviews with Independent Filmmakers by Scott MacDonald, An Introduction to the American Underground Film by Sheldon Renan, Animation in the Cinema by Ralph Stephenson, and Film Culture magazine.

Breer won the 1987 Maya Deren Independent Film and Video Artists' Award, presented by the American Film Institute.

His film Eyewash was included in Treasures IV: American Avant-Garde Film 1947-1986.

== Archives ==
The following films were preserved by Anthology Film Archives:

- Form Phases I (1952)
- Form Phases II (1953)
- Form Phases III (1954)
- Form Phases IV (1956)
- Un Miracle (1954)
- Recreation (1956)
- Motion Pictures No. 1 (1956)
- Jamestown Baloos (1957)
- A Man and His Dog Out for Air (1957)
- Le Mouvement (1957)
- Eyewash (1959) – both versions
- Blazes (1961)
- Breathing (1963)
- Fist Fight (1964)
- 66 (1966)
- 69 (1969)
- 70 (1971)
- 77 (1970)
- Fuji (1974)
- Swiss Army Knife with Rats and Pigeons (1981)
- Bang! (1986)

The following films were preserved by the Academy Film Archive:

- Form Phases #4 (1954, preserved 2019)
- Sunday Morning Screenings (1960, a trailer for Cinema 16)
- Time Flies (1997, preserved 2018)
- Atoz (2000, preserved 2018)
