= Jordan Belson =

American artist and filmmaker (1926–2011)

- Born: Jordan Belson; June 6, 1926; Chicago
- Died: September 6, 2011; San Francisco
- Occupations: Artist, Film maker

Jordan Belson (June 6, 1926 – September 6, 2011) was an American artist and abstract cinematic filmmaker who created nonobjective, often spiritually oriented, abstract films spanning six decades.

== Biography ==
Belson was born in Chicago, Illinois.

Belson studied painting at the University of California, Berkeley. He saw the "Art in Cinema" screenings at the San Francisco Museum of Art beginning in 1946. The films screened at this series inspired Harry Smith, Belson and others to produce abstract films. Belson's first abstract film was Transmutation (1947), now lost. A few of his films were screened in later screenings of the "Art in Cinema" series. Following these early films, Belson made a few films with his scroll paintings.

He was the recipient of a grant from the Museum of Non-Objective Painting, which later became the Guggenheim (Oskar Fischinger recommended him to the MoNOP curator Hilla von Rebay). Much of Belson's work is meant to evoke a mystical or meditative experience.

In 1957 he began a collaboration with sound artist Henry Jacobs at the Morrison Planetarium in San Francisco, California that lasted until 1959. Together they produced a series of electronic music concerts accompanied by visual projections at the Planetarium, the Vortex Concerts. Belson as visual director programmed kinetic live visuals, and Jacobs programmed electronic music and audio experiments. This is a direct ancestor of the 60s light shows and the "Laserium"-style shows that were popular at planetaria later in the century. The Vortex shows involved projected imagery, specially prepared film excerpts and other optical projections. Not just an opportunity to develop new visual technologies and techniques, the sound system in the planetarium enabled Belson and Jacobs to create an immersive environment where imagery could move throughout the entire screen space, and sound could move around the perimeter of the room.

Belson also created special effects for The Right Stuff (1983).

His last film Epilogue was commissioned for the Visual Music exhibition at the Hirshhorn/Smithsonian and completed in 2005. The New York Times described it as having "lush and misty optics."

Belson died of heart failure at his home in San Francisco on September 6, 2011. He was 85.

== Influence ==
His films had an influence on George Lucas.

== Filmography ==
- Transmutation (1947) – lost
- Improvisation #1 (1948) – lost
- Mambo (1951)
- Caravan (1952)
- Bop-Scotch (1952)
- Mandala (1953)
- Raga (1958)
- Séance (1959)
- High Voltage (1959) with James Whitney
- Allures (1961) 8" short
- LSD (1962) Unfinished film. (According to Belson, it should not be on his filmography)
- Re-entry (1964)
- Phenomena (1965)
- Samadhi (1967)
- Momentum (1968)
- Cosmos (1969)
- World (1970)
- Meditation (1971)
- Chakra (1972)
- Light (1973)
- Cycles (1975) made with Stephen Beck
- Music of the Spheres (1977), original version
- Infinity (1980)
- Quartet (1982) unfinished film
- Fountain of Dreams (1984)
- Northern Lights (1985)
- Mysterious Journey (1997)
- Bardo (2001)
- Epilogue (2005)

== See also ==
- Jane Conger Belson Shimané
- Visual music
- Laser lighting display
