= Frank Stauffacher =

American filmmaker (1917–1955)

- Born: 1917; San Francisco, California, U.S.
- Died: July 24, 1955 (aged 37–38); San Francisco, California, U.S.
- Occupation: Experimental filmmaker
- Spouse: Barbara Stauffacher Solomon (m. 1948)
- Relatives: Jack Stauffacher

Frank Stauffacher (1917 – 24 July 1955) was an American experimental filmmaker, best known for directing the cinema series "Art in Cinema" at the San Francisco Museum of Modern Art from 1946 to 1954.

He was the cinematographer for Mother's Day (1948) and Adventures of Jimmy (1950), two films by James Broughton. His brother, Jack Stauffacher, is a well-known printer and typeface creator. On December 18, 2013, Notes on the Port of St. Francis was selected for the Library of Congress's National Film Registry.

From November 1948 until his death in 1955 from a brain tumor, Stauffacher was married to graphic artist Barbara Stauffacher Solomon.

Stauffacher's short film Zigzag was preserved by the Academy Film Archive in 2013.

== Selected filmography ==
- Sausalito (1948) impressionistic film of Sausalito, California
- Zigzag (1948) color film of neon signs
- Notes on the Port of St. Francis (1951) with narration by Robert Louis Stevenson read by Vincent Price

== Bibliography ==
- Frank Stauffacher, Art in Cinema (San Francisco: Society for Art in Cinema, 1947) first edition
- Barbara Stauffacher Solomon, Memoir of North Beach, SF and Frank Stauffacher n Zyzzyva magazine
