= No-budget film =

Film made with very little or no money

A no-budget film is a film made with very little or no money. Actors and technicians are often employed in these films without remuneration. A no-budget film is typically made at the beginning of a filmmaker's career, with the intention of either exploring creative ideas, testing their filmmaking abilities, or for use as a professional "calling card" when seeking creative employment. No-budget films are commonly submitted to film festivals, the intention being to raise widespread interest in the film.

No-budget films are financed out-of-pocket by the director, who typically takes on multiple roles, or else uses a crew of volunteers.

== Examples ==
In 1960, Ron Rice released The Flower Thief, starring Taylor Mead, to positive reception. The film was produced for less than $1,000 using black-and-white 16 mm 50' film cartridges left over from aerial gunnery equipment used during World War II. In the early 1960s, filmmaker Jack Smith used discarded color-reversal film stock to film Flaming Creatures. John Waters' 1964 black-and-white film Hag in a Black Leather Jacket reportedly cost $30 to make, though Waters has said that he stole the film stock. Craig Baldwin's Flick Skin is entirely made from discarded film, or "found footage", retrieved from a projectionist's booth. The No Wave Cinema movement of the late 1970s, represented by filmmakers such as Vivienne Dick, produced many notable no-budget films shot on Super 8, such as Beauty Becomes The Beast. In 1996, Sarah Jacobson's first feature film, Mary Jane's Not a Virgin Anymore, was made with "one camera, one tape recorder, one mic and, like, four lights". G. B. Jones took 13 years to film, direct and edit on Super 8 film the feature film The Lollipop Generation (2008), which was filmed whenever she could afford to buy a roll of film. In 2012, first-time director Shawn Holmes shot his debut film Memory Lane with non-professional actors and a budget of less than $300. In the same year, Goodbye Promise became the first film distributed online directly to its audience via a crowdfunding platform. The 2013 sci-fi Hyperfutura by James O'Brien employed found footage married to a live action narrative to create a dystopian future on an inventive no-budget scale. The budget for Brian Patrick Butler’s black comedy Friend of the World was so small that it was said to cost less than a monthly spend on coffee, relying on its black and white images and stage play setup.

Footage for no-budget films is often shot on location, either with permission, or without permission (i.e. "guerrilla filmmaking"), using sites such as the filmmaker's home, backyard, or local neighborhood. Jonás Cuarón spent a year taking photographs of his friends and family which he then compiled into his fictional film Year of the Nail (2007).

No-budget films have often been made in the past using Super 8 film or video, but recent films have taken advantage of low-cost digital cameras and editing programs. A notable example of this could be found in the work of ASS Studios, a no-budget film studio founded in 2011 by Courtney Fathom Sell and Jen Miller on the Lower East Side of New York City.

No-budget films can be distributed at film festivals that focus on independent and experimental films, such as the Flicker Film Festival and No Budget Film Festival in Los Angeles, The 8 Fest in Toronto, and the Trasharama A-Go-Go festival in Australia. The Polish brothers distributed their no-budget film For Lovers Only on iTunes and relied on social media to publicize it.

Examples of well-received no-budget films are Kevin Smith's Clerks, Christopher Nolan's Following, Jafar Panahi's Taxi, Shane Carruth's Primer, Robert Rodriguez's El Mariachi, Bruno Stagnaro & Israel Adrián Caetano's Pizza, birra, faso, Nabwana I.G.G.'s Who Killed Captain Alex?, Jörg Buttgereit’s Nekromantik, Cyrus Frisch's Why Didn't Anybody Tell Me It Would Become This Bad in Afghanistan, Gints Zilbalodis's Away, and Frederick C.G. Borromeo's Distortion.

== See also ==
- Kino (movement)
- Low-budget film
- Underground film
- Video art
