= Beverly Grant (actress) =

American actress

- Born: October 14, 1936; Detroit, Michigan, U.S.
- Died: July 4, 1990 (aged 53); London, Ohio, U.S.
- Occupations: Actress; filmmaker

Beverly Grant (October 14, 1936 – July 4, 1990) was an actress and filmmaker who appeared in films by Andy Warhol, Jack Smith, Gregory Markopoulos, Ira Cohen, Ron Rice, and Stephen Dwoskin, on the off-off Broadway stage in works by Ronald Tavel and LeRoi Jones (Amiri Baraka), as well as collaborated with her one-time husband, experimental filmmaker and musician, Tony Conrad. Smith, the avant-garde filmmaker of Flaming Creatures and Normal Love, in which Grant appeared, called her "the queen of the underground – both undergrounds."

== Career ==
A native of Detroit, Grant appeared in Jack Smith's controversial film Flaming Creatures (1963) and his second, unfinished feature film, Normal Love, which began shooting in 1963 as controversy over Flaming Creatures was beginning to erupt. Andy Warhol also appeared as one of the film's "Bathing Beauties," who cavorted on a giant prop wedding cake constructed by Claus Oldenburg.

In Normal Love, Grant played the role of the Cobra Woman in an erotic coupling with the Mummy, played by Tony Conrad. After the shoot, the two began an actual romantic engagement off the set, causing a falling-out with Smith, who saw it as a normative, heterosexual coupling out of sync with the ideal of a transgressive eroticism portrayed in his films.

Among the Warhol films in which Grant appeared (with Smith) were his first full-length film, the unfinished Batman/Dracula, and three Screen Tests, one of which was widely shown as part of Warhol's compilation of screen tests with female subjects that was known as The 13 Most Beautiful Women. In one of the most frequently shown of the Screen Tests, Grant impersonated an anguished silent movie diva, pulling her long, black hair. Grant also appeared in Stephen Dwoskin's Naissant (1964), Ron Rice's Chumlum (1963), Gregory Markopoulos' The Illiac Passion (1967), and Ira Cohen's Invasion of the Thunderbolt Pagoda (1968).

Grant, who studied under Stella Adler, also had a prolific although short career on the off-off-Broadway stage, with roles in LeRoi Jones's The Toilet (1964) and Ronald Tavel's Shower (1965), directed by John Vaccaro, as well as Vaccaro's Theatre of the Ridiculous production of Conquest of the Universe in 1967.

Together, Grant and Conrad produced the feature-length film Coming Attractions (1970) with Warhol superstar Frances Francine, the purely abstract film Straight and Narrow (1970), and Four Square (1971). Like Conrad's experimental film The Flicker (1965), Coming Attractions utilized a flicker-like strobe effect within the narrative.

In 1972, Conrad and Grant toured Europe, meeting many underground filmmakers.

Grant left New York in 1973 to move with Conrad to Yellow Springs, Ohio, where Conrad taught at Antioch College. During this time, she earned a master's degree from Wright State University, and performed in local theater. After she and Conrad divorced in 1976, Grant remained in Yellow Springs, raising the couple's son, Theodore.

In her later years, Grant worked as a drug- and alcohol-abuse counsellor in London, Ohio, where she died of cancer at the age of 54 on July 4, 1990.
