= Bill Flowers =

Bill Flowers may refer to:

- Bill Flowers (artist) (born 1963) an Australian artist
- Bill Flowers (racing driver) (born 1959), American stock car racing driver
