= Justin Peacock =

Justin Peacock may refer to:

- Justin Peacock, character in The Affairs of Martha
- Justin Peacock (filmmaker) of Trasharama A-Go-Go
