= Flaming Creatures =

1963 experimental film by Jack Smith

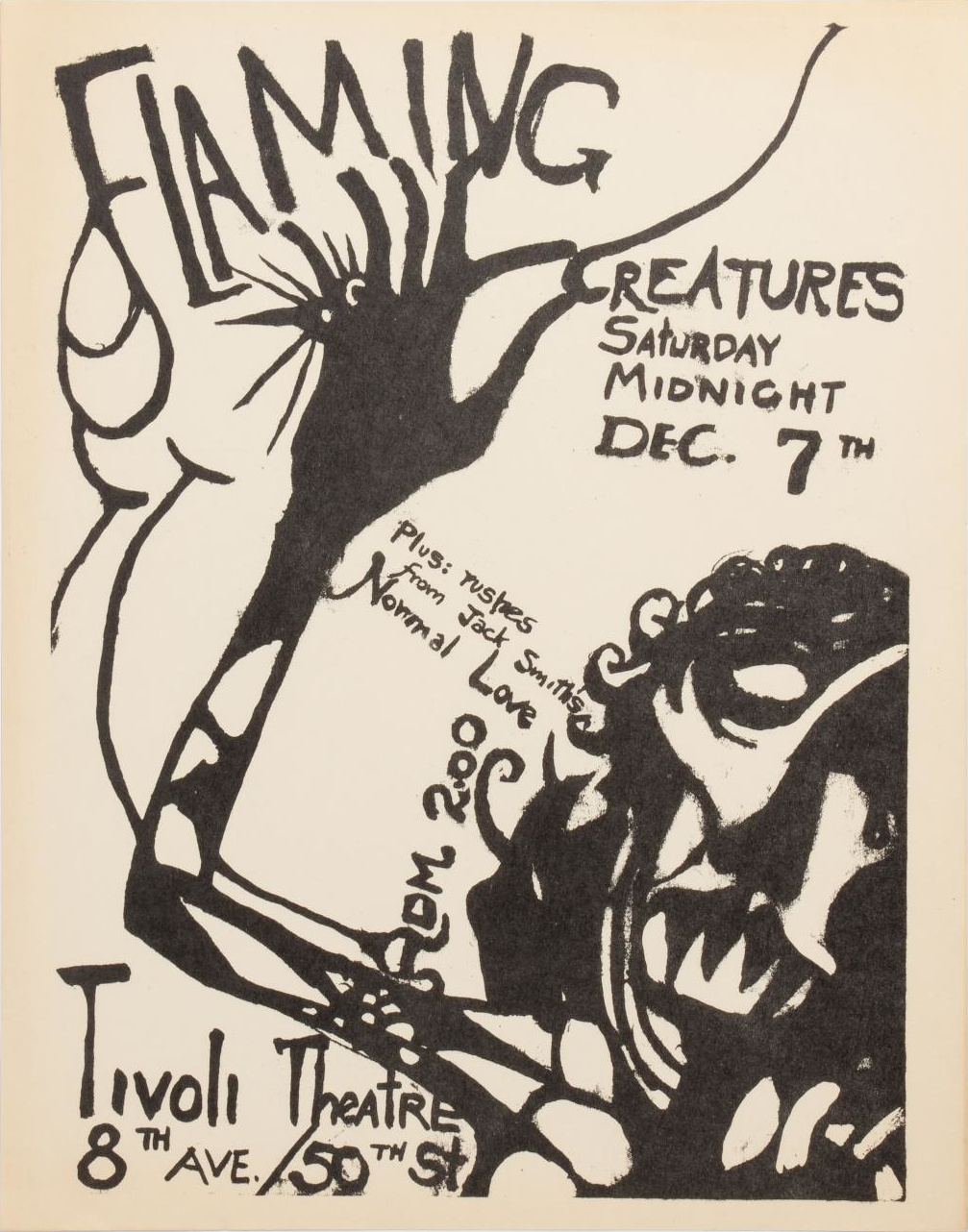
- Theatrical release poster
- Directed by: Jack Smith
- Produced by: Jack Smith
- Starring: Francis Francine; Sheila Bick; Joel Markman; Mario Montez; Judith Malina
- Distributed by: The Film-Makers' Cooperative
- Release date: April 29, 1963
- Running time: 42 minutes
- Country: United States
- Language: English
- Budget: $300

Flaming Creatures is a 1963 American experimental film directed by Jack Smith. The film follows an ensemble of drag performers through several disconnected vignettes, including a lipstick commercial, an orgy, and an earthquake. It was shot on a rooftop on the Lower East Side on a very low budget of only $300, with a soundtrack from Smith's roommate Tony Conrad. It premiered April 29, 1963, at the Bleecker Street Cinema in Greenwich Village.

Because of the film's sexual content, some venues refused to show Flaming Creatures, and in March 1964, police interrupted a screening and seized a print of the film. The screening's organizers (Jonas Mekas, Ken Jacobs, and Florence Karpf) were prosecuted, and the film was ruled to be in violation of New York's obscenity laws. Mekas and critic Susan Sontag mounted a critical defense of Flaming Creatures, and it became a cause célèbre for the New American Cinema movement. Judge Abe Fortas, who had spoken in favor of reversing the convictions, faced scrutiny for his position years later when he was nominated to become Chief Justice of the United States. Flaming Creatures eventually fell out of circulation. After Smith's death, a restoration was undertaken to preserve the film.

== Plot ==
Most of the film's characters are sexually ambiguous, including transvestite, intersex, and drag performers. Flaming Creatures is largely non-narrative, and its action is often interrupted by cutaways to close-ups of body parts.

The film opens with a credits sequence set to the soundtrack of Ali Baba and the Forty Thieves and the announcement that "Ali Baba comes today!". Two creatures laze in a garden and dance. In what Smith called the "smirching sequence", characters apply lipstick while a mock advertisement poses the question, "Is there lipstick that doesn't come off when you suck cocks?" Two creatures chase each other, and one throws the other to the ground. Several creatures gather around her in a rape scene, which grows into a large orgy. The earth begins to quake, and the creatures collapse.

A vampire resembling Marilyn Monroe climbs out of a coffin and drains some of the lifeless creatures. This reignites the action, and the creatures rise again to dance with one another.

== Cast ==
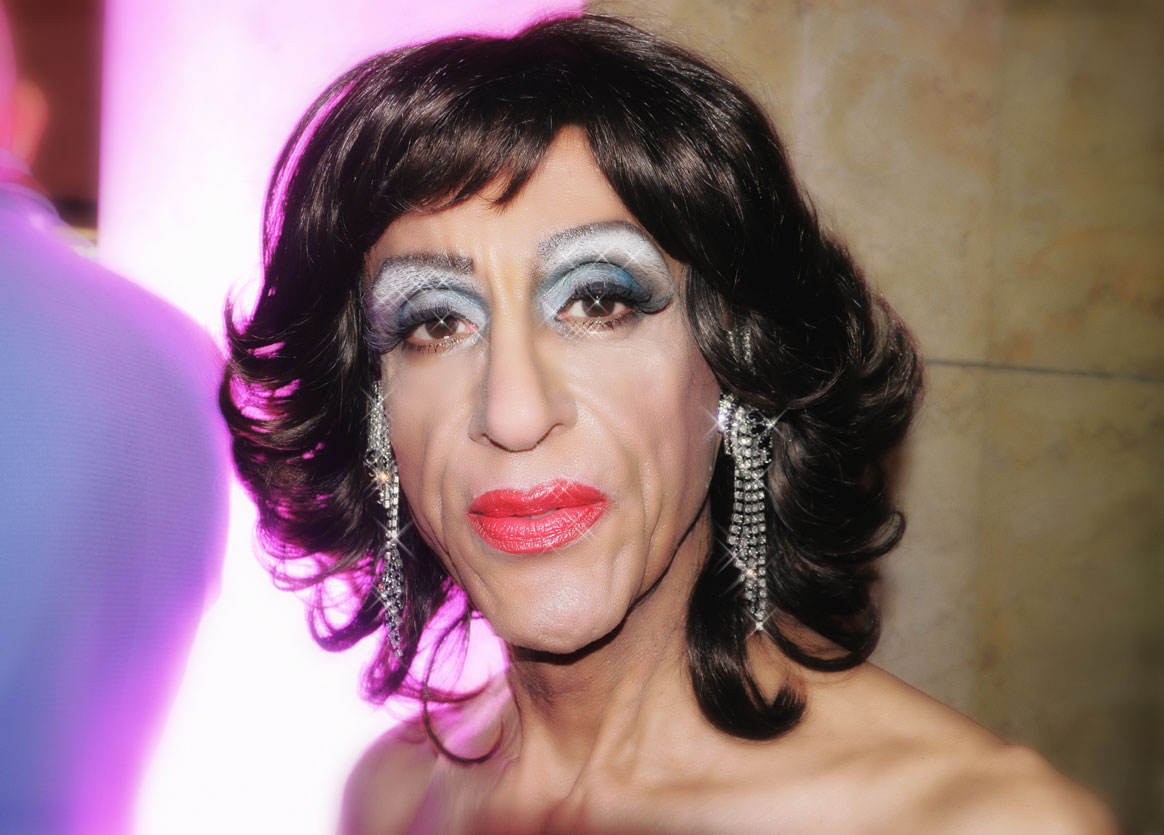
Flaming Creatures marked the first film role for Mario Montez (pictured in 2012).

- Francis Francine as herself
- Sheila Bick as Delicious Dolores
- Joel Markman as Our Lady of the Docks
- Mario Montez as the Spanish girl (credited as Dolores Flores)
- Arnold Rockwood as Arnold
- Judith Malina as the Fascinating Woman
- Marian Zazeela as Maria Zazeela

== Production ==
=== Pre-production ===
Smith shared an apartment with artist Marian Zazeela for a period during the early 1960s. He began taking seminude black-and-white photographs with her as a model, along with Francis Francine, Joel Markman, Mario Montez, Arnold Rockwood, and Irving Rosenthal. This grew into The Beautiful Book, a small volume of photographs published with the help of Piero Heliczer. The book began to develop the aesthetic of Flaming Creatures.

Smith conceived the idea of making a film to serve as a vehicle for Zazeela. However, she began working with composer La Monte Young and was unable to participate in Smith's project. After she moved out, he became roommates with Tony Conrad and replaced Zazeela with Sheila Bick.

=== Filming ===
Filming of Flaming Creatures took place over eight weekend afternoons in mid to late 1962. Many of the models from The Beautiful Book made appearances in the film. Smith held shoots on the roof of the Windsor Theatre, at 412 Grand Street on the Lower East Side. Dick Preston offered his loft above the theatre for use as a prop department and dressing room. Unable able to review rush prints between shoots, Smith made extensive preparations before each session. He filmed the scenes out of order, beginning with the closing dance sequence. The earthquake sequence was shot in intense summer heat, with Smith and Ronald Tavel throwing dust from ceiling plaster onto the actors. Francis Francine was injured after being hit by a large piece of plaster.

Smith filmed on a Bolex 16 mm camera borrowed from Preston. He had observed the effects of using out-of-date film while working on Ken Jacobs' Star Spangled to Death and decided to use the technique after seeing Ron Rice's The Flower Thief. He mixed multiple black-and-white reversal film stocks, mostly specialty or Army surplus stock stolen from the discard bins at a Camera Barn store. These included Kodak Plus-X, Perutz Tropical, Agfa-Ferrania, and DuPont. The rolls were out-of-date, giving parts of the film a foggy or high-contrast texture.

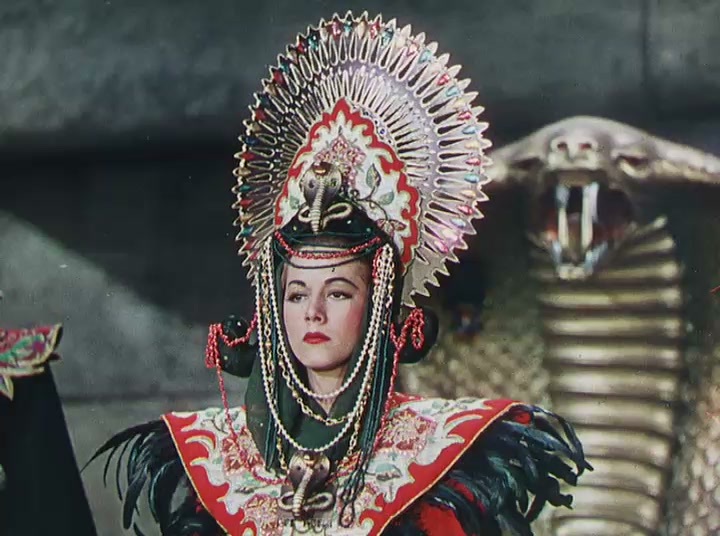
Maria Montez in Cobra Woman (1944)

The film's working title was Pasty Thighs and Moldy Midriffs; Smith also considered using Flaking Moldy Almond Petals, Moldy Rapture, or Horora Femina. He was highly influenced by director Josef von Sternberg and actress Maria Montez, both of whom he discussed in essays published in Film Culture before the film's release. Smith admired von Sternberg's films for their extravagant, exoticist settings; their preferential treatment of visual texture over plot; and the androgynous sexuality of actress Marlene Dietrich. Smith was interested in Maria Montez, a Dominican actress who starred in exotic adventure films during the 1940s, because of her intense, passionate acting style. He incorporated allusions to earthquake scenes from White Savage and Cobra Woman; the wedding procession in Ali Baba and the Forty Thieves; a slave, portrayed by Jeni Le Gon, who attends to Montez's character in Arabian Nights; and promotional imagery of Montez reclining languidly. He made Flaming Creatures as a way to depict "different ideas of glamour" and film "all the funniest stuff he could think of". The film was produced for a very low budget of $300.

=== Post-production ===
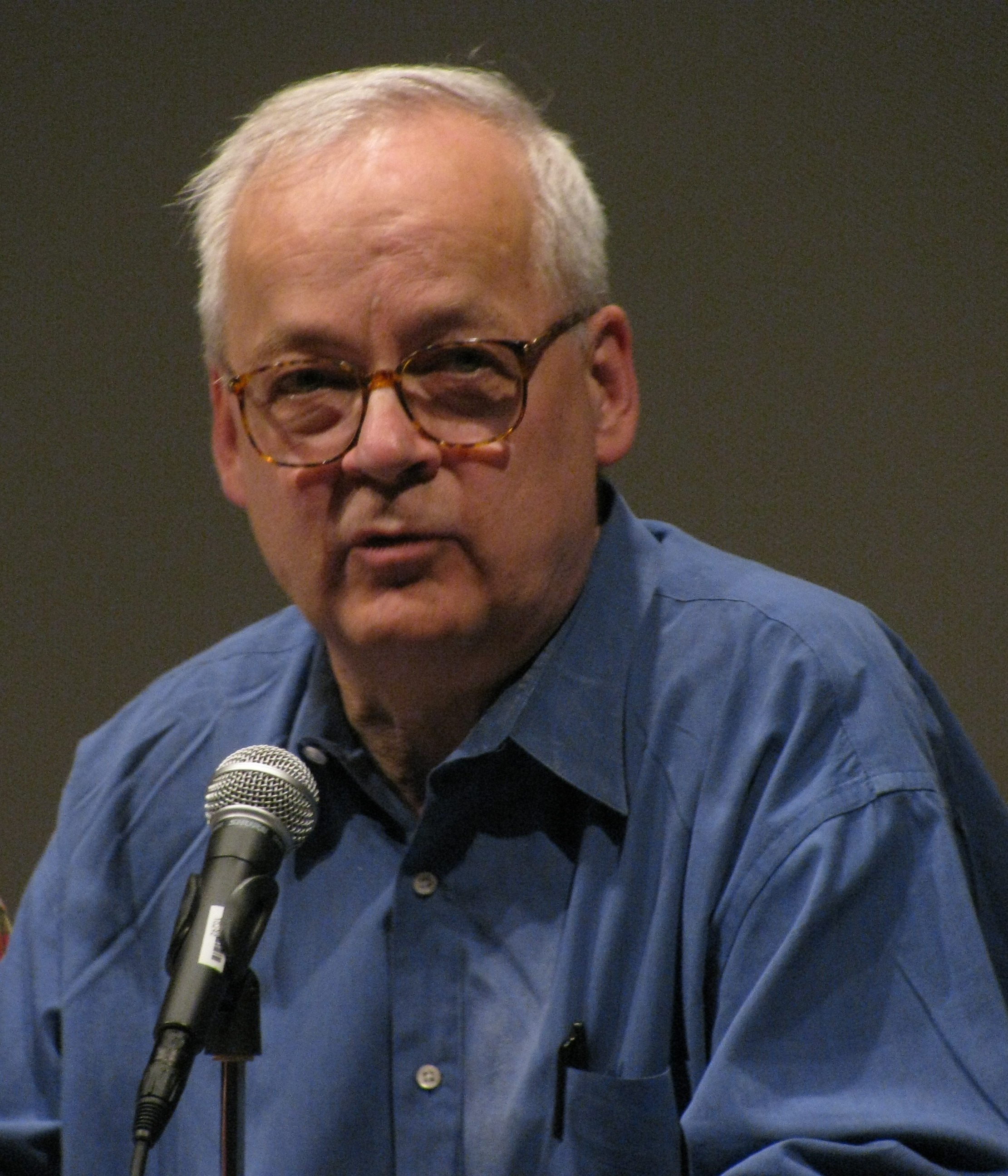
Smith's roommate Tony Conrad (pictured in 2009) produced the soundtrack.

After filming had completed, Smith sent the footage to filmmaker Stan Brakhage in Denver so it could be processed. Brakhage had developed a close relationship with a laboratory there through his own experiences dealing with contentious footage. With the processed footage in hand, Smith edited the film and used most of the production footage in the final cut; Flaming Creatures had a low shooting ratio and only 15 minutes of outtakes. A credit sequence was painted by Zazeela.

Tony Conrad, with whom Smith shared an apartment, produced the film's soundtrack. The two lived in a building on the Lower East Side, where musician Angus MacLise lived and into which Mario Montez ended up moving. They held informal group sessions during the evening, which Conrad recorded. The soundtrack, a tape collage, incorporates "Siboney" by Ernesto Lecuona, "Amapola" by Joseph Lacalle, and various pasodobles.

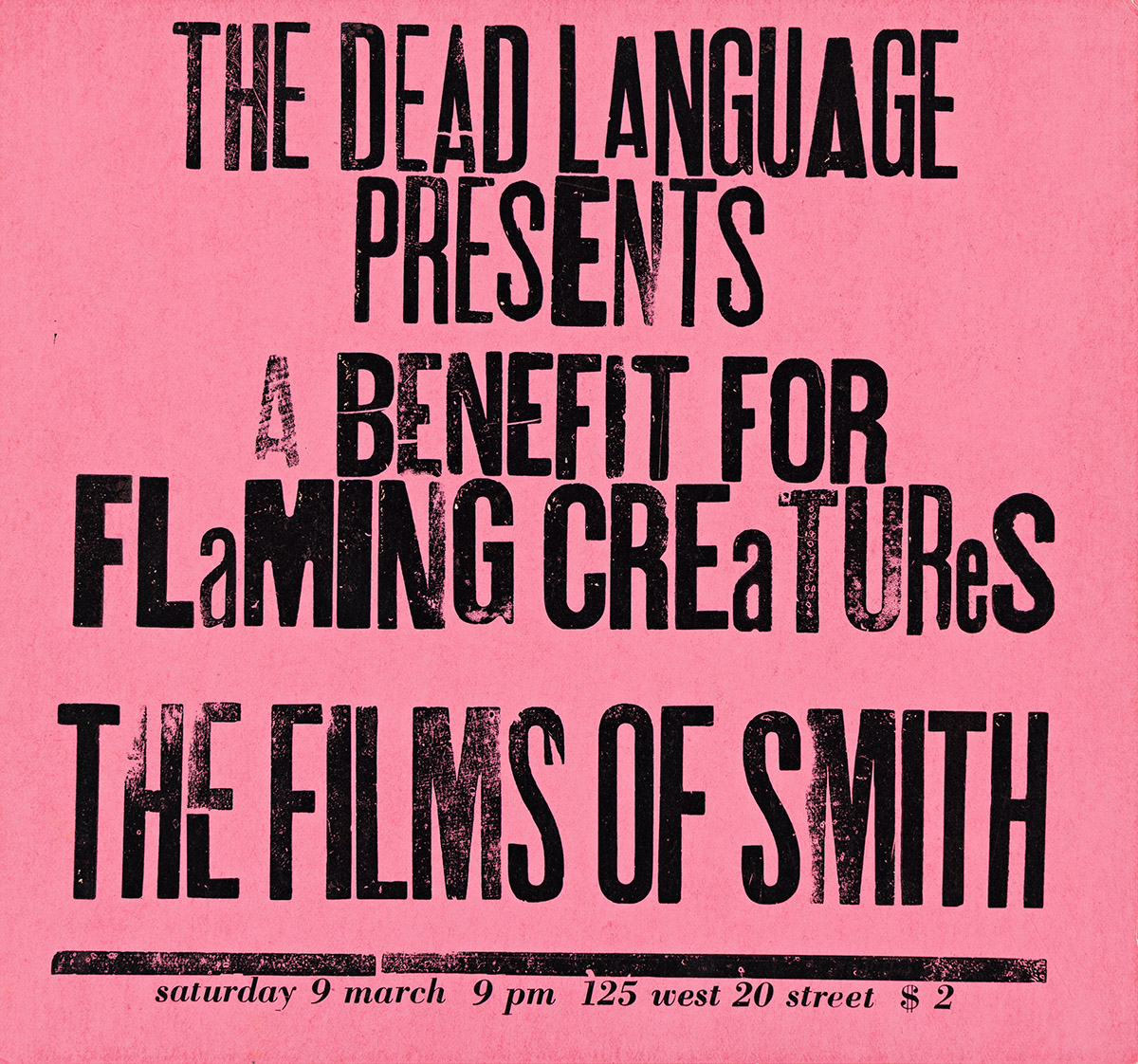
Flyer advertising a March 1963 benefit for Flaming Creatures

As Flaming Creatures was being completed, Smith began screening unfinished versions of it to friends. Heliczer held a benefit for the film at painter Jerry Joffen's loft. Mekas discussed a private screening of the film through his column in The Village Voice, and Conrad produced a second version of the soundtrack for the film's theatrical premiere.

== Release ==
=== Early screenings ===
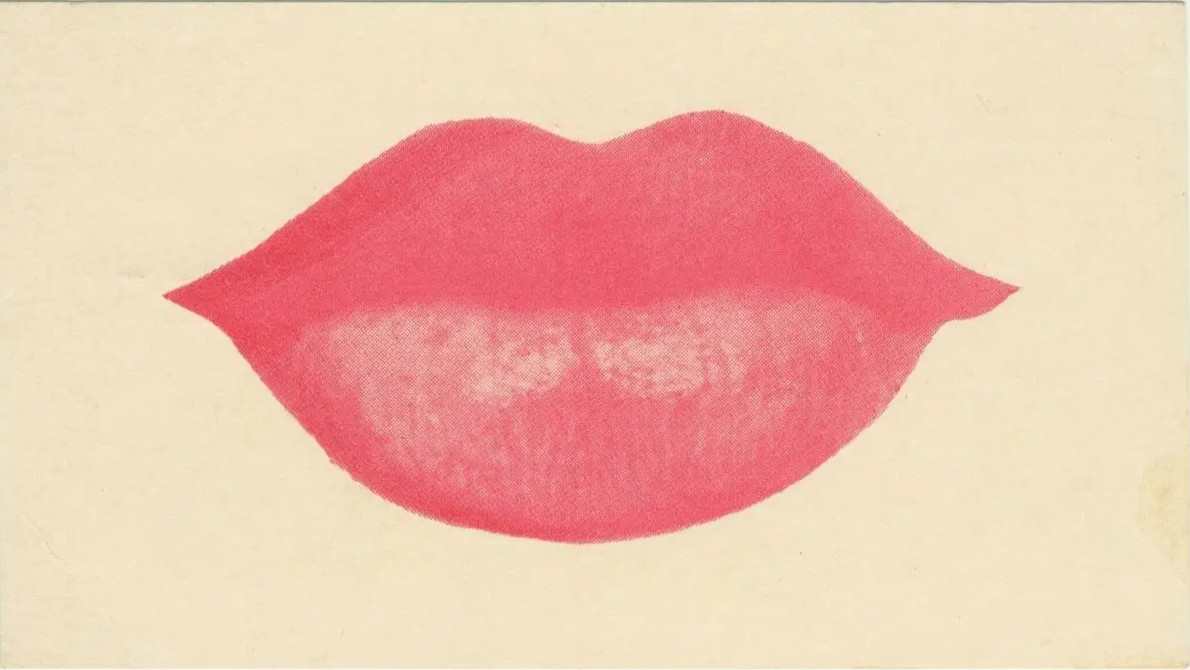
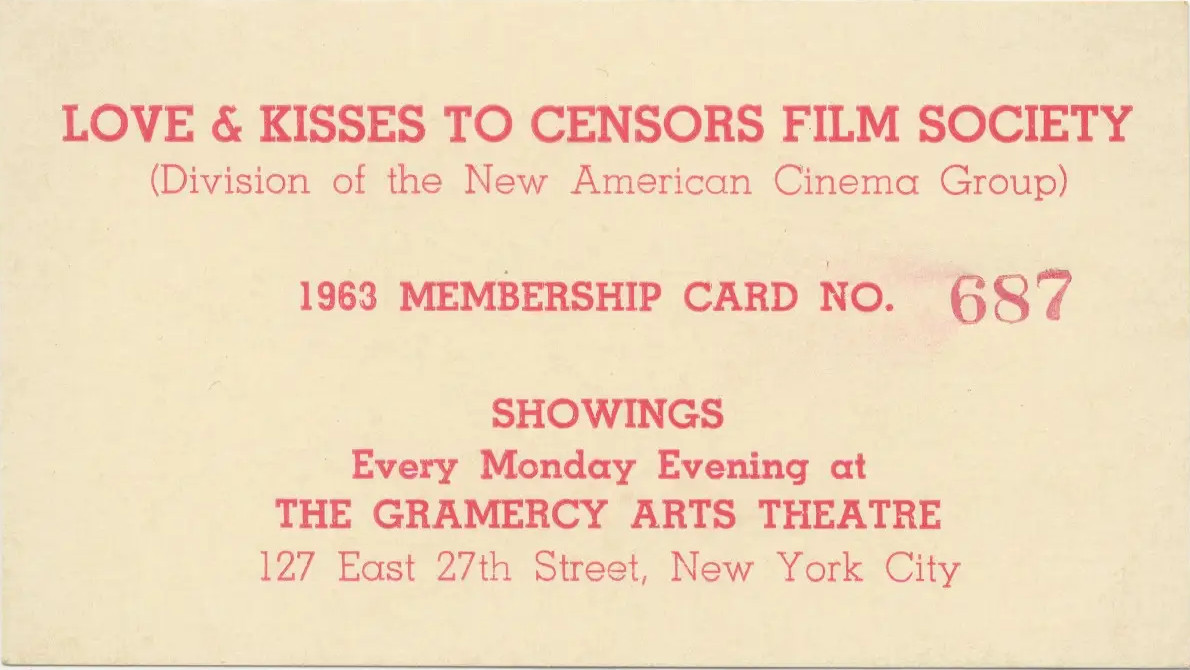
Membership card for the Love and Kisses to Censors Film Society

Flaming Creatures premiered on April 29, 1963 as part of a double feature with Blonde Cobra at the Bleecker Street Cinema in Manhattan, New York. Later screenings were held at the Gramercy Theatre. Because the film had not been submitted for licensing, the shows were free and audiences were asked to donate to the "Love and Kisses to Censors" Film Society. Jonas Mekas and Ken Jacobs presented the film as a midnight screening at the Flaherty Film Seminar in August 1963, a trip depicted in Mekas's film Lost, Lost, Lost.

Film Culture voted in December 1963 to award Smith its Independent Film Award for the film. It rented the Tivoli Theatre, known for showing sexploitation films, and planned a screening of Flaming Creatures, excerpts from Smith's Normal Love, and Andy Warhol's Newsreel. However, the theatre canceled the event due to the obscene content in Flaming Creatures. Several hundred people gathered at the theatre, and Smith was given his award in an impromptu ceremony. A crowd of several hundred people, led by Barbara Rubin, occupied the Tivoli until police could clear the building.

At the third Knokke-Le-Zoute Experimental Film Festival, the selection committee rejected Flaming Creatures out of concern that it fell afoul of Belgium's obscenity laws. In protest, Mekas resigned from the festival jury, and several American filmmakers threatened to withdraw their films. Mekas smuggled in the film in a canister for Stan Brakhage's Dog Star Man and held continuous private screenings out of his hotel. On New Year's Eve, Mekas, Rubin, and P. Adams Sitney forced their way into a projection booth to screen Flaming Creatures and pretended to tie up the projectionist, filmmaker Jean-Marie Buchet. They managed to show a portion of the film, but festival staff turned off power for the projector. As chaos broke out in the theatre, Minister of Justice Piet Vermeylen came to calm the crowd. The incident made news across Europe, and Vermeylen promised reforms in censorship laws.

=== Obscenity trial and censorship ===
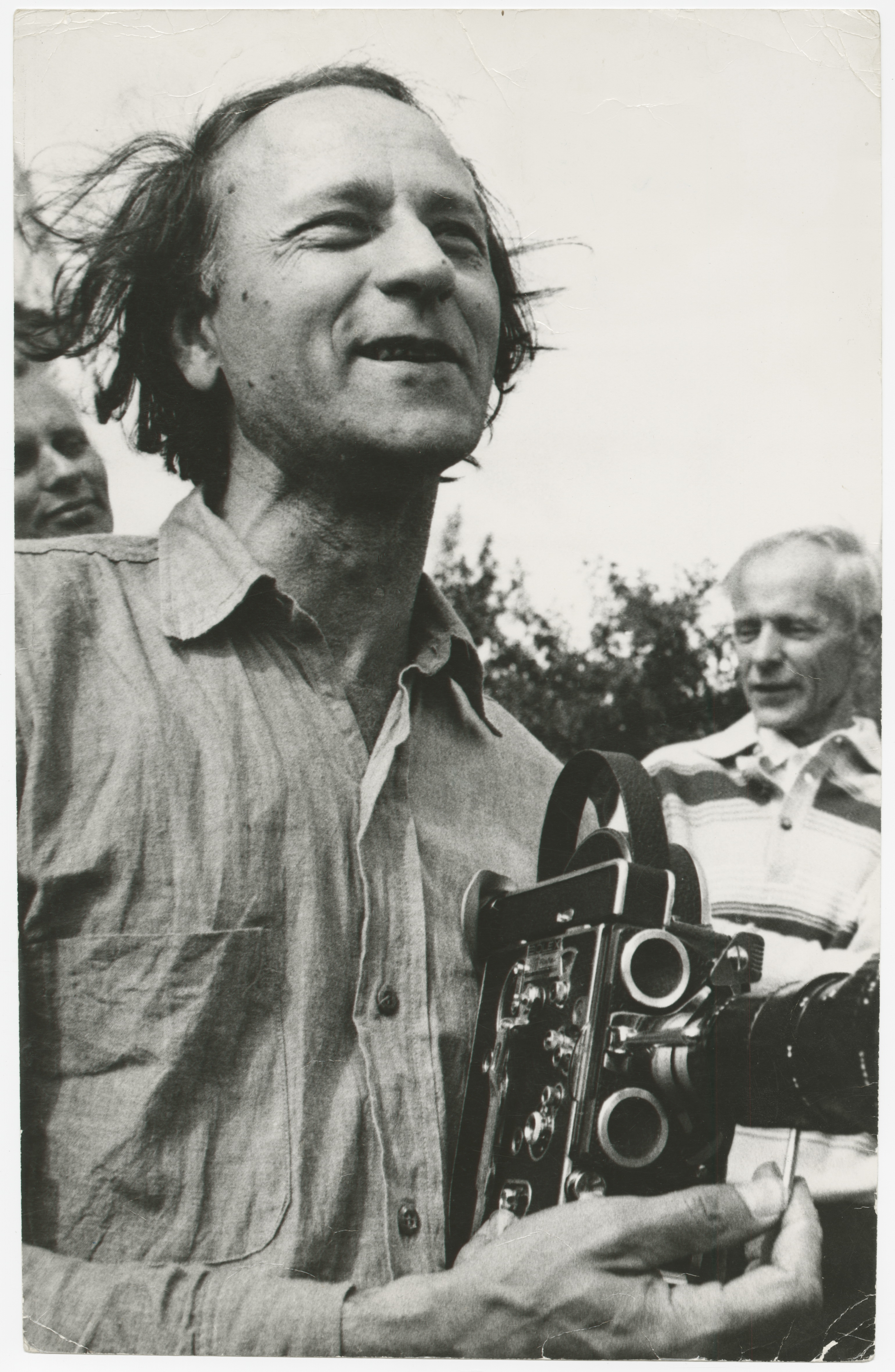
Jonas Mekas (pictured in 1971) was among those arrested and prosecuted for screening the film.

In February 1964, the Film-Makers' Cinematheque successfully showed the films from the Tivoli program at the New Bowery Theater, as a program titled "Our Infamous Surprise Program". During the program's third showing on March 3, police stopped the event while Flaming Creatures was being screened. They arrested Mekas, Jacobs, Florence Karpf, and Jerry Sims and seized the film reels and projection equipment. The police department did not return the only print of Warhol's film, about the making of Normal Love, and it is now considered lost.

Four days after the raid, Mekas held a benefit screening of Jean Genet's Un chant d'amour at the Writers Stage Theatre. The event was intended to raise money for a legal defense fund, but also to publicly link the censorship of Flaming Creatures to the work of a respected artist. Nevertheless, police seized the film, along with Stephen Dwoskin's Newsreel of Two Underground Film Stars Having Breakfast in Bed, and arrested Mekas again for violating obscenity laws. The charges from this screening were dismissed under an agreement that Flaming Creatures not be shown until the legal status of Un chant d'amour was decided.

Jerome Hill, a filmmaker and patron of the arts, agreed to fund the legal defense for Flaming Creatures. Civil rights lawyer Emile Zola Berman accepted the case, believing it would potentially reach the U.S. Supreme Court. Sims, who had been taking tickets, managed to avoid prosecution by claiming he had not seen what was on the screen. People of the State of New York v. Kenneth Jacobs, Florence Karpf and Jonas Mekas was heard on June 12, 1964. As part of the defense, expert testimony came from filmmaker Shirley Clarke, poet Allen Ginsberg, writer Susan Sontag, filmmaker Willard Van Dyke and film historian Herman G. Weinberger. The defendants were convicted but given suspended sentences. They unsuccessfully appealed in the state court on the grounds that the trial had excluded the expert testimony provided, and "whatever view this Court might hold as to the obscenity of 'Flaming Creatures,' it is manifest that the appellants herein believe in good faith that the film is not obscene." The U.S. Supreme Court dismissed an appeal. Fifty years later, the prosecutor for the case issued an apology to Mekas, writing, "Although my appreciation of free expression and aversion to censorship developed more fully as I matured, I should have sooner acted more courageously."

In April 1965, an off-campus screening by students of the University of New Mexico was raided by police, who seized the print. In November 1966, a screening by the UT Austin chapter of Students for a Democratic Society was broken up. A January 1967 screening at the University of Michigan resulted in the confiscation of the film and the arrest of four students, triggering protests and a sit-in by students. A screening at the University of Notre Dame at its Pornography and Censorship Conference in 1969 was canceled. When students attempted to screen prohibited films, police interrupted the event, leading to the school's first known violent conflict between police and students.

=== Later history ===
Smith withdrew Flaming Creatures from circulation while the court case was being appealed, commenting, "I'm sorry about the whole thing…I'd like to stay in obscurity." He continued to show his own print and re-edit it over the years, not wanting his creative works to ossify. By the late 1960s, his print had degraded to the point that it was difficult to project. Anthology Film Archives held the original camera negative of the film, and when Smith requested access to it so he could re-edit it, Mekas refused, out of fear that the print would be damaged. This led to a long-running dispute between the two, with Smith accusing Mekas of stealing the print on behalf of Anthology. The negative was lost until 1978, when Jerry Tartaglia found it in a discarded pile of scrap and returned it to Smith.

It was not until after Smith's death in 1989 that larger institutions started to screen Flaming Creatures. Critic J. Hoberman and performer Penny Arcade saved Smith's belongings and had a restoration of the film made, a project which took five years. The New York Film Festival showed the film in 1991, and the Museum of the Moving Image included it in a 1997 retrospective of Smith's work.

== Critical reception ==
When Flaming Creatures was released in 1963, Film Culture reviewer Ken Kelman described it as a Miltonian "ancient ritual chant…not for the Paradise Lost, but for the Hell Satan gained." In the Saturday Review, Arthur Knight called the film a "faggoty stag-reel ... defiling at once both sex and cinema." Pete Hamill, writing for The Saturday Evening Post, described it as "a sophomoric exercise in the kind of sex that Henry Miller dealt with 30 years ago."

Following the seizure of the film, the director of the Homosexual League of New York called Flaming Creatures "long, disturbing and psychologically unpleasant". Curator Amos Vogel likened it to a film noir that "despite flashes of brilliance and moments of perverse, tortured beauty" was full of "limp genitalia and limp art." Sontag praised the film in a 1966 essay as a "rare modern work of art: it is about joy and innocence." P. Adams Sitney described Flaming Creatures as "a mythic vision of redeemed innocence" in which Smith "utterly transforms his sources and uncovers a mythic center from which they had been closed off." Jonathan Rosenbaum called the film "one of the greatest and most pleasurable avant-garde movies ever made". According to The Village Voice Film Guide, Gregory Markopoulos "was only slightly exaggerating when he commented that ... early audiences were astounded when their secret Hollywood fantasies burst upon the screen".

== Legacy ==
Flaming Creatures became Smith's best-known work and his last finished film. Although he continued filmmaking, his subsequent projects were never given fixed form. Smith was often resentful of the publicity that surrounded the film. His feud with Mekas over the distribution of Flaming Creatures became a recurring subject of his performance pieces, with Mekas represented by a character named "Uncle Fishhook".

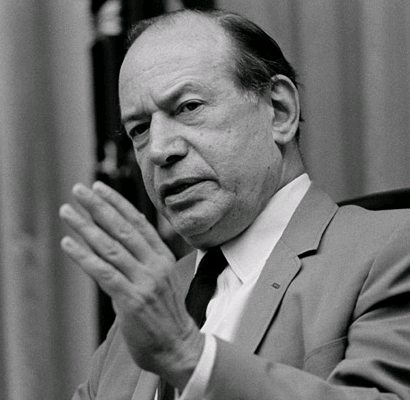
A screening of Flaming Creatures was held during the Chief Justice nomination of Abe Fortas (pictured in 1968).

In 1968, Associate Justice Abe Fortas was nominated to be Chief Justice of the United States. Fortas had previously spoken in favor of reversing the original convictions for screening Flaming Creatures, so Senator James Eastland, chairman of the Senate Judiciary Committee, requested that the print seized at the University of Michigan be sent to Washington. James Clancy, representing Citizens for Decent Literature, showed the film among other material, inviting senators to view what Fortas had held in several decisions did not constitute obscenity. Nixon adviser Pat Buchanan, who dubbed it the "Fortas Film Festival", identified it as one of the most effective tactics in undercutting the nomination.

Anthology Film Archives has placed Flaming Creatures in its Essential Cinema Repertory collection. The Austrian Film Museum has included the film in its cyclical Was ist Film program, preceding Leni Riefenstahl's propaganda film Triumph of the Will. The film is listed in the reference book 1001 Movies You Must See Before You Die, which says "The film's distinctive beauty is due largely to Smith's nimble use of the handheld camera. His unexpected framings yield dense images of fabrics, body parts, and heavily made-up faces."

Video artist Bec Stupak, having never seen the original film, created a "remake" of Flaming Creatures in 2006 based only on descriptions of it. Todd Haynes alluded to the film with a fictional band named the Flaming Creatures in his 1998 feature Velvet Goldmine. Guy Maddin's 2009 film The Little White Cloud That Cried was conceived as a tribute to Flaming Creatures.

== See also ==
- Blonde Cobra
- List of cult films

== Sources ==
- Arthur, Paul (1992). "Routines of Emancipation: Alternative Cinema in the Ideology and Politics of the Sixties". In James, David E. (ed.). To Free the Cinema: Jonas Mekas & the New York Underground. Princeton University Press. ISBN 978-0-691-07894-6.
- Dixon, Wheeler Winston (2006). Visions of Paradise. Rutgers University Press. ISBN 978-0-8135-3797-9.
- Hoberman, J.; Rosenbaum, Jonathan (1983). Midnight Movies. Harper & Row. ISBN 978-0-06-090990-1.
- Hoberman, J. (2008). On Jack Smith's Flaming Creatures. Granary Books. ISBN 978-1-887123-52-5.
- Hoberman, J. (2010). "Flaming Creatures (1963)". In Lim, Dennis (ed.). The Village Voice Film Guide: 50 Years of Movies from Classics to Cult Hits. John Wiley & Sons. ISBN 978-1-118-04079-9.
- Hoberman, J. (2025). Everything Is Now: The 1960s New York Avant-Garde—Primal Happenings, Underground Movies, Radical Pop. Verso Books. ISBN 978-1-80429-086-6.
- Joseph, Branden W. (2008). Beyond the Dream Syndicate: Tony Conrad and the Arts After Cage. Zone Books. ISBN 978-1-890951-86-3.
- Leffingwell, Edward; Kismaric, Carole; Heiferman, Marvin, eds. (1997). Jack Smith: Flaming Creature. Serpent's Tail. ISBN 978-1-85242-429-9.
- MacDonald, Scott (1998). A Critical Cinema 3: Interviews with Independent Filmmakers. University of California Press. ISBN 978-0-520-20943-5.
- McMahon, Kevin J. (2024). A Supreme Court Unlike Any Other. University of Chicago Press. ISBN 978-0-226-83108-4.
- Morrison, James (2007). The Cinema of Todd Haynes: All That Heaven Allows. Wallflower Press. ISBN 978-1-904764-77-9.
- Pierson, Michele (2011). "Introduction". In Pierson, Michele; James, David E.; Arthur, Paul (eds.). Optic Antics: The Cinema of Ken Jacobs. Oxford University Press. ISBN 978-0-19-538498-7.
- Siegel, Marc (1997). "Documentary That Dare/Not Speak Its Name: Jack Smith's Flaming Creatures". In Holmlund, Chris; Fuchs, Cynthia (eds.). Between the Sheets, In the Streets. University of Minnesota Press. ISBN 978-1-4529-0131-2.
- Siegel, Marc (2019). "Flaming Creatures". In Schneider, Steven Jay (ed.). 1001 Movies You Must See Before You Die. B.E.S. Publishing. ISBN 978-1-4380-5075-1.
- Silverstein, Mark (2007). Judicious Choices: the New Politics of Supreme Court Confirmations. W. W. Norton & Company. ISBN 978-0-393-93044-3.
- Sitney, P. Adams (1979). Visionary Film: The American Avant-Garde, 1943–1978. Oxford University Press. ISBN 978-0-19-502486-9.
- Sontag, Susan (2001). Against Interpretation and Other Essays. Picador. ISBN 978-0-312-28086-4.
- Suárez, Juan A. (1996). Bike Boys, Drag Queens, and Superstars. Indiana University Press. ISBN 978-0-253-32971-4.
- Verevis, Constantine (2020). Flaming Creatures. Columbia University Press. ISBN 978-0-231-19147-0.
- Turquety, Benoît (2023). "A Film-maker's Film Histories". In Hagener, Malte; Zimmermann, Yvonne (eds.). How Film Histories Were Made: Materials, Methods, Discourses. Amsterdam University Press. doi:10.1515/9789048554577. hdl:20.500.12657/85023. ISBN 978-94-6372-406-7.
