= Jack Smith (film director) =

American filmmaker (1932–1989)

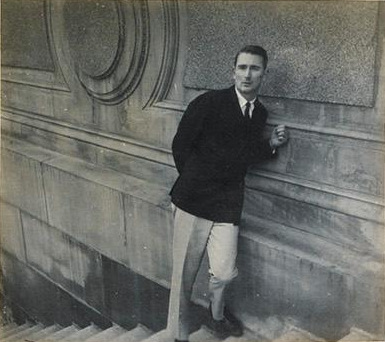
- Jack Smith, c. 1962
- Born: November 14, 1932; Columbus, Ohio, U.S.
- Died: September 18, 1989 (aged 56); New York City, U.S.
- Occupations: Filmmaker, actor, photographer
- Known for: Flaming Creatures (1963)

Jack Smith (November 14, 1932 – September 18, 1989) was an American filmmaker, actor, and pioneer of underground cinema. He is generally acclaimed as a founding father of American performance art, and has been critically recognized as a master photographer.

== Life and career ==
Smith was raised in Texas, where he made his first film, Buzzards over Baghdad, in 1952. He moved to New York City in 1953.

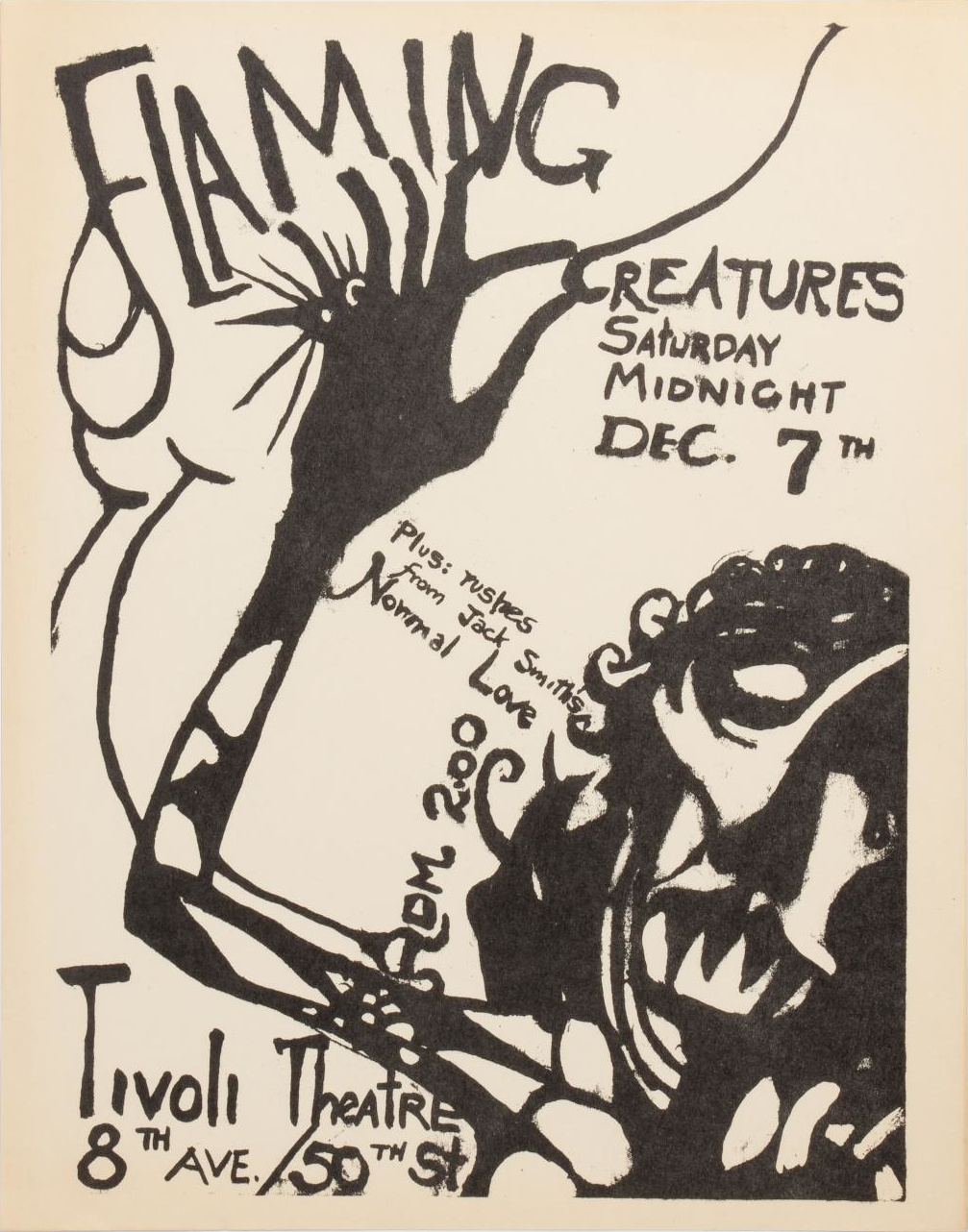
Flaming Creatures (1963)

The most famous of Smith's productions is Flaming Creatures (1963). The film, that first put camp on the map, is a satire of Hollywood B movies and tribute to actress Maria Montez, who starred in many such productions. However, authorities considered some scenes to be pornographic. Copies of the movie were confiscated at the premiere, and it was subsequently banned from public view. Despite not being viewable, the movie gained some anti-heroic notoriety when footage was screened during Congressional hearings and right-wing politician Strom Thurmond mentioned it in anti-porn speeches.

Smith's next movie Normal Love (aka Normal Fantasy, Exotic Landlordism of Crab Lagoon, and The Great Pasty Triumph) (1963–1964) was the only work in Smith's oeuvre with an almost conventional length (120 mins.), and featured multiple underground stars, including Mario Montez, Diane di Prima, Tiny Tim, Francis Francine, Beverly Grant, John Vaccaro, and others. The rest of his productions consists mainly of short movies, many never screened in a cinema, but featured in performances and constantly re-edited to fit the stage needs (including Normal Love).

After his last completed film, No President (1967), (Smith’s follow-up film, Sinbad In the Rented World (1972–1984) was never completed) he created small intermedia performance and experimental theatre work until his death on September 18, 1989, from AIDS-related pneumonia. Smith produced many theatrical mini-productions, often using slide projectors, in his loft and in art space settings such as Artists Space and Colab's The Times Square Show. Descriptors of lobsters as greedy landlords dominate, along with crabs, Atlantis, 1950s exotica music, and camp-glamorous North African costumes. A pungent odor of burning incense and marijuana often perfumed the performances.

Apart from appearing in his own work, Smith worked as an actor. He played the lead in Andy Warhol's unfinished film Batman Dracula, Ken Jacobs's Blonde Cobra, and appeared in several theater productions by Robert Wilson.

Smith also worked as a photographer and founded the Hyperbole Photographic Studio in New York City. In 1962, he released The Beautiful Book, a collection of pictures of New York artists, that was re-published in facsimile by Granary Books in 2001. As a draftsman, his posters, hand written scripts and drawing-notes superimpose a very eccentric personal imagery onto the traditional language of theater.

In 1978, Sylvère Lotringer conducted a 13-page interview with Smith (with photos) in Columbia University's philosophy department publication of Semiotext(e). It was collected in 2013 in Schizo-Culture: The Event, The Book. In 2014, it was released as a limited-ledition vinyl picture disc by Semiotext(e).

In 1987, Smith was awarded an honorary Doctor of Humane Letters (L.H.D.) degree from Whittier College.

== Estate ==
In 1989, New York performance artist Penny Arcade tried to salvage Smith's work from his apartment after his long bout with AIDS and subsequent death. Arcade attempted to preserve the apartment as Smith had transformed it – an elaborate stage set for his never-to-be-filmed epic Sinbad in a Rented World – as a museum dedicated to Jack Smith and his work. This effort failed when the landlord decided to evict them.

Until the mid-2000s, Smith's archive was co-managed by Arcade, alongside the film historian J. Hoberman via their corporation, The Plaster Foundation, Inc. Within ten years of Smith's death, the Foundation, operating largely without funding but through donations and good will, was able to restore all of Smith's films, create a major retrospective curated by Edward Leffingwell at PS 1 (the Contemporary Arts Museum, now part of MoMA), put his films back into international distribution, and publish several books on Jack Smith and his work.

In January 2004, the New York Surrogate's Court ordered Hoberman and Arcade to return Smith's archive to his legal heir, estranged, surviving sister Sue Slater. Hoberman and Arcade fought to dismiss Slater's claim, arguing that she abandoned Jack's apartment and its contents; the Plaster Foundation created the archive and took possession of the work only after 14 years of repeated, documented attempts at communication with her. In a six-minute trial, Judge Eve Preminger rejected the Foundation's argument and awarded the archive to Slater.

By October 2006, the foundation still refused to surrender Smith's archive to the estate, claiming money owed them for expenses associated with managing the archive—and hoping Smith's work would be bought by an appropriate public institution that could safeguard his legacy and keep the works in the public eye. According to curator Jerry Tartaglia, the dispute was resolved as of 2008, with the purchase of Smith's estate by the Gladstone Gallery.

== Legacy ==
Smith was one of the first proponents of the aesthetics which came to be known as 'camp' and 'trash', using no-budget means of production (e.g. using discarded color reversal film stock) to create a visual cosmos heavily influenced by Hollywood kitsch, orientalism and with Flaming Creatures created drag culture as it is currently known. Smith was heavily involved with John Vaccaro, founder of the Playhouse of the Ridiculous, whose disregard for conventional theater practice deeply influenced Smith's ideas about performance art. In turn, Vaccaro was deeply influenced by Smith's aesthetics. It was Vaccaro who introduced Smith to glitter and in 1966 and 1967, Smith created costumes for Vaccaro's Playhouse of the Ridiculous. Smith's style influenced the film work of Andy Warhol as well as the early work of John Waters. While Vaccaro and Smith disputed the idea that their sexual orientation was responsible for their art, both are thought to have been part of the 1960s gay arts movement.

In 1992, performer Ron Vawter recreated Smith's performance "What's Underground about Marshmallows" in Roy Cohn/Jack Smith which he presented in a live performance and which was later released as a film directed by Jill Godmilow and produced by Jonathan Demme.

Playwright Richard Foreman was influenced by Smith.

Tony Conrad produced two CDs from the Jack Smith tape archives subtitled 56 Ludlow Street that were recorded at 56 Ludlow Street between 1962 and 1964.

In 2017, Jerry Tartaglia directed a documentary called Escape from Rented Island: The Lost Paradise of Jack Smith which is a film essay concerning the works of Jack Smith, aimed at the artist's most devoted followers.

In 2009, Germany's Arsenal Institute for Film and Video Art in Berlin staged Five Flaming Days in a Rented World, a festival and conference on Smith's work. The event included several commissioned short films in tribute to Smith's films, the most noted of which was Guy Maddin's The Little White Cloud That Cried.

== Selected filmography ==
By Jack Smith

- 1952: Buzzards Over Baghdad
- 1961: Scotch Tape
- 1963: Flaming Creatures (b/w, 46 minutes)
- 1963: Normal Love (120 minutes)
- 1967: No President (a/k/a The Kidnapping of Wendell Willkie by The Love Bandit, ca. minutes)

With Jack Smith as actor

- 1960: in Ken Jacobs's Little Stabs at Happiness
- 1963: in Jacobs's Blonde Cobra
- 1963: in Ron Rice's Queen of Sheba Meets the Atom Man
- 1963: in Rice's Chumlum
- 1965: in Andy Warhol's Camp
- 1966: in Warhol's Hedy (a/k/a Hedy the Shoplifter) starring Mario Montez and Mary Woronov
- 1971: in John Lennon and Yoko Ono's Up Your Legs Forever
- 1974: in Ted Gershunny's Silent Night, Bloody Night starring Mary Woronov, Patrick O'Neal, John Carradine, Candy Darling, Ondine, and Tally Brown
- 1989: in Ari Roussimoff (Frankenhooker)'s Shadows in the City

About Jack Smith

- 2006: Jack Smith and the Destruction of Atlantis, documentary written, directed, and co-produced by Mary Jordan

== Books by Smith ==
- 1960 16 Immortal Photos
- 1962 The Beautiful Book (dead language press, republished 2001 Granary Books)
- 2026 What's Underground About Marshmallows? Texts by and about Jack Smith/Texte von und über Jack Smith. Herausgegeben von/Edited by Marc Siegel. Texts by Jack Smith, Marc Siegel, Susan Sontag, Stefan Brecht, J. Hoberman, Jonas Mekas, Sylvère Lotringer. Alexander Verlag Berlin. ISBN 978-3-89581-622-2
