= Chumlum =

- Directed by: Ron Rice
- Music by: Angus MacLise
- Release date: 1963
- Running time: 26 minutes
- Country: United States

Chumlum is a 1963 American experimental short film directed by Ron Rice.

== Description ==
Chumlum uses superimpositions dense with visual elements such as people and fabrics.

Chumlum is largely non-narrative, with no dialogue or clear succession of events. It begins with the exterior of a building before moving to a loft inside, where Jack Smith is swinging. Many more people, dressed in elaborate costumes with ambiguous gender presentation, join. They lie in hammocks, smoke opium, caress each other, and dance. Smith appears as a wizard who has cast a spell to entrance and pacify them. The setting shifts to a forest and finally a beach.

The film uses multiple superimpositions to create abstract patterns. Visual elements such as sheets, hammocks, dancers, limbs, pearls, waves, and birds are layered over each other. It contains exoticist visual references to ancient Rome, tropical Latin America, and Orientalism.

== Production ==
During the production of Smith's Normal Love, Rice often accompanied the director to film shoots. After the day's shooting was complete, Smith and the cast members, still in their costumes from the film, sometimes congregated at Rice's loft on Canal Street. Chumlum was made during these visits. Actors in the film include Smith, Beverly Grant, Mario Montez, Gerard Malanga, and Barbara Rubin. One of its outdoor locations was a field of goldenrods that also serves as the setting for Smith's Yellow Sequence.

== Release ==
The Gramercy Arts Theater screened Chumlum in December 1963 with two other films by Rice—The Queen of Sheba Meets the Atom Man and Senseless. The city's license department charged the venue with presenting an improperly licensed program. John Fles arranged the film's West Coast premiere, a double feature with the Flash Gordon serial Rocket Ship.

Anthology Film Archives preserved Chumlum with a 35 mm restoration which premiered in 2018. The film is part of their Essential Cinema Repertory collection. It was digitized for home media as part of the 2009 DVD box set Treasures IV: American Avant-Garde Film, 1947–1986.
