= Up Your Legs Forever =

- Original 1971 U.S. movie poster for a collection of films by Lennon and Ono
- Directed by: John Lennon; Yoko Ono
- Release date: 1971
- Running time: 70 minutes
- Country: United States
- Language: English

Up Your Legs Forever is a 1971 film by John Lennon and Yoko Ono. The film was made on 14 December 1970 on West 61st Street in Manhattan, New York City, though the couple did not have permits to work in the United States at that time.

The film was based on Ono's earlier script Film No. 12 (Up Your Legs Forever). The earlier script was also known as Film No. 12 (Esstacy). The script reads "The camera work of the film should constantly go up, up, up, non-stop. Collect 367 pairs of legs and just go up the legs (from toes to the end of thighs) pair after pair and go on up until you run through the whole 367".

The participants in the film were paid $1 each for their appearance, and each received a black and white instant photograph of them taken by Lennon. The writer Jonathan Cott in his 2013 book Days That I'll Remember: Spending Time With John Lennon & Yoko Ono wrote that Ono told him that "We can't have peace until we expose ourselves to each other. After you communicate like that then maybe we can have peace. And everyone who's in the film, including you, will be a star".

The film was made for a three evening series of films by Lennon and Ono at New York City's Elgin Theater.

Notable participants in the film included filmmaker Shirley Clarke, each member of the band New York Dolls, writer Paul Krassner, lawyer Allen Klein, artist Peter Max, model Taylor Mead, filmmaker Jonas Mekas, filmmaker D. A. Pennebaker, artist Larry Rivers, artist George Segal, film director Jack Smith and writer Tom Wolfe.

== Plot ==
The film shows, one at a time, 367 pairs of human legs. It was shot using an elevator rig that moved the camera vertically, allowing the camera to scan the legs from toes to thigh. The film is 70 minutes in length and ends with a shot of Lennon and Ono's buttocks.

The soundtrack for the film consists of comments made during filming. The film's credits are read out by Lennon.

== Reception ==
In his 1995 book Screen Writings: Texts and Scripts from Independent Films, Scott MacDonald describes Up Your Legs Forever as "less impressive" than other film script adaptations by Ono as it does not advance beyond her "remarkable previous feature No. 4 Bottoms, which focuses on buttocks rather than legs".
