= The Little White Cloud That Cried (film) =

2009 Canadian film

- Directed by: Guy Maddin
- Written by: Lexi Tronic
- Starring: Breanna Rose Taylor; Marcia Ferreira; Eric Wood; Lexi Tronic; Teresa Braun; Zsa Zsa LaBitche; Sex Party Marty
- Cinematography: Evan Johnson
- Edited by: John Gurdebeke
- Production companies: Arsenal Institute for Film and Video Art
- Release date: October 28, 2009 (Hebbel am Ufer)
- Running time: 13 minutes
- Countries: Germany; Canada
- Language: English

The Little White Cloud That Cried is a German-Canadian experimental short film, directed by Guy Maddin and released in 2009. A tribute to underground filmmaker Jack Smith's 1963 film Flaming Creatures, it is a 16 mm film depicting a fantasia in which sea goddesses rise up out of the water to engage in an orgiastic battle. Writer and performer Lexi Tronic described the film as "the story of religious battles in an androgynous world, where everyone is trans-tabulous."

The cast includes Breanna Rose Taylor, Marcia Ferreira, Eric Wood, Lexi Tronic, Teresa Braun, Zsa Zsa LaBitche and Sex Party Marty.

The film premiered on October 28, 2009, at Five Flaming Days in a Rented World, a Smith tribute festival and conference in Berlin, and had its first Canadian screening on November 28, 2009, in Winnipeg, Manitoba.

It was subsequently named to TIFF's year-end Canada's Top Ten list for 2010.
