= Enrico Banducci =

American impresario (1922–2007)

- Banducci outside the hungry i theater, Ghirardelli Square, 1969
- Born: Harry Charles Banducci; February 17, 1922; Bakersfield, California, U.S.
- Died: October 9, 2007 (aged 85); South San Francisco, California, U.S.
- Occupation: Impresario
- Known for: Owner of the hungry i

Enrico Banducci (born Harry Charles Banducci; February 17, 1922 – October 9, 2007) was an American impresario. Banducci operated the Hungry I nightclub in San Francisco's North Beach neighborhood after purchasing the club from its founder, Eric "Big Daddy" Nord, in 1950.

During Banducci's ownership, the Hungry I helped launch the careers of numerous acts, including The Kingston Trio, Lenny Bruce, Mort Sahl, Bill Cosby, Jonathan Winters, and Barbra Streisand, and featured Woody Allen and Dick Cavett before they were well-known. The club is also credited with originating the "brick wall" backdrop, popular in Stand-up comedy presentations.

Banducci later also started the Clown Alley hamburger stand as well as Enrico's Sidewalk Cafe at 504 Broadway, a 1959 restaurant and jazz club, featured in Bullitt, Basic Instinct and Dark Passage.

== Biography ==
Harry Banducci was born in 1922 in Bakersfield, Kern County, California, registered at birth as Henry Banducci on August 20, 1915, to Italian Americans Fred and Meda (née Chicca) Banducci. He came to San Francisco at age 13 to study under the concertmaster of the San Francisco Symphony. He supported himself as a violinist early in life but always maintained that he began playing a little too late to become a truly world-class great player. He also dabbled in singing operatic music with his deep voice and changed his first name to "Enrico" after his idol Enrico Caruso. He was married five times, the first to Raimonde Verney, daughter of a symphony violinist. He began wearing a beret after a health inspector insisted he cover his hair while running a food operation, and continued the practice to hide his eventual baldness. Although he once calculated that he made over $10 million from his various projects, he spent it all on his lavish lifestyle, with a yacht and incessant travel. He spent time in jail, and was involved in a number of brawls, with his friends nicknaming him "Rocky" as a result, long before the Stallone movie. The hungry i went bankrupt at least once. Newspaper columnist Herb Caen frequently chronicled Banducci's adventures, and Les Crane and Ira Blue each had a live radio talk show inside the hungry i for a while circa the early '60s.

In 1981, Mort Sahl, Jonathan Winters, Professor Irwin Corey, Jackie Vernon, Ronnie Schell and a host of others gathered to film a tribute to Banducci that was nationally televised and entitled The hungry i Reunion. The film is intercut with reminiscences by Bill Cosby, Maya Angelou (who started at Banducci's club performing Caribbean songs and patter while imitating a Caribbean accent) and Phyllis Diller.

In 1988, after he lost Enrico's to one of its several closures over the years, he became a hot dog vendor also serving homecooked Italian food in Richmond, Virginia at the "hungry i hot dog stand" on land located in Shockoe Slip, the city's most upscale restaurant district, which he had purchased for his son years earlier, much to the chagrin of the surrounding restaurateurs, who objected in vain to the presence of a small wooden one-man hot dog stand in a parking lot with a sign proclaiming "hungry i hot dog stand" amidst their deluxe multi-floored dining establishments; he moved back to San Francisco in the late 1990s.

Banducci died in his sleep in South San Francisco, California at the age of 85.

Banducci is portrayed by Jon Polito in a large supporting role in the 2014 film Big Eyes.
