= Taylor Mead's Ass =

- Directed by: Andy Warhol
- Starring: Taylor Mead
- Release date: 1964
- Country: United States
- Language: English

Taylor Mead's Ass is a film by Andy Warhol featuring Taylor Mead, consisting entirely of a shot of Mead's buttocks, and filmed at The Factory in 1964.

== Production ==
According to Watson's Factory Made: Warhol and the Sixties, Taylor Mead had achieved a degree of fame that "inspired a backlash." One example was a letter to the editors at The Village Voice in August 1964 by Peter Emanuel Goldman, who was upset by Jonas Mekas's film reviews for the paper: "I have tolerated his praise of films shot without cameras, films shot without lenses, films shot without film, films shot out of focus, films focusing on Taylor Mead's ass for two hours, etc. . . . But the August 13 column in praise of Andy Warhol was a bit too much." Mead replied in a letter to the publication: "Re. Peter Goldman's letter in The Voice, Andy Warhol and I have searched the archives of the Warhol colossus and find no 'two hour film of Taylor Mead's ass.' We are rectifying this undersight with the unlimited resources at our command. Love and kisses." Two days later, Warhol shot the "sixty-minute opus that consisted entirely of Taylor Mead's Ass," during which Mead first exhibits a variety of movement, then appears to "shove a variety of objects up his ass." The film was Mead's last for Warhol "for more than three years", at the end of 1964, "Mead felt betrayed by Warhol for not showing the film." The satirical devices of exaggeration and incongruity are represented by the objects that give characteristics such as simile, symbolism, hyperbole, imagery, and foreshadowing to the film's pop culture iconography in the form of a photo of Lady Bird Johnson; another of Tippi Hedren and Rod Taylor in The Birds; another of Liz Taylor and Richard Burton in The V.I.P.s; and the Beatles on the cover of Life, Hemingway's Moveable Feast, followed by Tolstoy's Anna Karenina, a gay porn magazine entitled BIG, flowers, a vacuum cleaner hose, plus a Scott toilet tissue wrapper, which creates an avant-garde social commentary, historic time-capsule, and psychosexual drama. The film subsequently has received one review on IMDB, from an external source, an internet blog.

The film was described as "seventy-six seriocomic minutes of this poet/actor's buttocks absorbing light, attention, debris" by Wayne Koestenbaum, in Art Forum. In his book, Andy Warhol, Koestenbaum writes, "Staring at his cleft moon for 76 minutes, I begin to understand its abstractions: high-contrast lighting conscripts the ass into being a figure for whiteness itself, particularly when the ass merges with the blank leader at each reel's end. The buttocks, seen in isolation, seem explicitly double: two cheeks, divided in the centre by a dark line. The bottom's double structure recalls Andy's two-paneled paintings..."

== See also ==
- List of American films of 1964
- Andy Warhol filmography
