= Hungry I =

Nightclub in San Francisco, California, US

Coordinates: 37°47′46″N 122°24′18″W

- Interactive map of Hungry I
- Address: San Francisco, California; United States
- Owner: Eric "Big Daddy" Nord
- Type: Nightclub, comedy club, music venue

Construction
- Opened: 1949 or 1950
- Closed: 1970

The Hungry I (stylized as hungry i) was a nightclub in San Francisco, California, originally located in the North Beach neighborhood. It played a major role in the history of stand-up comedy in the United States. It was launched by Eric "Big Daddy" Nord, who sold it to Enrico Banducci in 1951. The club moved to Ghirardelli Square in 1967 and operated mostly as a rock music venue until it closed in 1970.

The name of the nightclub was reused later as a strip club in San Francisco, from the late 1960s until 2019.

== Name ==
Artist Mark Adams said in a 1983 interview about his design of the interior of the club:

In 1950, I was acting and designing sets for an amateur theatrical group. One of the men said he wanted to start a small club where actors could go after rehearsals and have coffee, pastry, a beer, et cetera, and sit around and talk unwind from the work. He asked if I would design the interior, and also think of a name. I came up with hungry I which referred to all the various hungers of the first person singular. The other man changed his name and personality as the club developed, and became Big Daddy Eric Nord of the Beat Generation.

In another story, the lower-case "i" was meant to represent "intellectual". "I was going to call it the Hungry Intellectual, but I ran out of paint" for the sign, Nord would tell interviewers. In another story, the sign was not finished in time for the club's opening, and next-day reviews in the San Francisco papers cemented the name for all time. Banducci swore that it was Freudian and was short for "the hungry id".

== History ==
The hungry i was founded in 1949 or 1950 as an 83-seat venue in the Sentinel Building's basement at the corner of Kearny and Columbus, by Eric Nord, who sold it to Banducci in 1951. After operating it as a venue for folk singers including Stan Wilson, Banducci began hiring comedians in 1953 with Mort Sahl, encouraging them to express themselves freely. Their success caused queues around the block, until Banducci moved the Hungry I to the nearby International Hotel (nicknamed "the I-Hotel") at 599 Jackson Street in 1954.

The hungry i and Banducci were instrumental in the careers of Mort Sahl, who was the pioneer of a new style of stand-up comedy, comic Bill Cosby, comic Lenny Bruce, and minister Malcolm Boyd. The Kingston Trio recorded two noted albums at the hungry i, including the first live performance of their version of "The Lion Sleeps Tonight". Tom Lehrer's final satirical album That Was the Year That Was (1965) was also recorded there, as well as The Limeliters' album Our Men in San Francisco (1963). Phyllis Diller also recorded a live comedy album at the venue in September 1962.

Jazz pianist Vince Guaraldi, folk singer Glenn Yarborough, the Gateway Singers, and comedians Godfrey Cambridge, Professor Irwin Corey and Joan Rivers were also given career boosts from their appearances at the Hungry I, as well as Dick Cavett and Woody Allen. The folk-rock group We Five were signed to A&M Records after Herb Alpert saw them perform there.

John Phillips and his group The Journeymen were the house band in the early 1960s.

The young Barbra Streisand begged Banducci for a single night at his nightclub, insisting that she would soon be a huge star. Banducci agreed to sign the singer, who had never performed professionally but was soon starring in I Can Get It for You Wholesale on Broadway. The resulting concerts (March–April 1963) were well-attended, giving Streisand nationwide acclaim.

On 16 January 1967, Laura Nyro started her debut live performances at the Hungry I. Later in the same year, Ike & Tina Turner performed at the club and a photograph of Tina Turner by Baron Wolman was used for the cover of the second issue of Rolling Stone magazine.

The comedy and folk music scene wilted in the mid-1960s. On 12 October 1967 Banducci closed the club at its International Hotel location and moved to Ghirardelli Square; it was mainly a rock music venue, and closed in 1970. Banducci and many of the club's performers, including Mort Sahl, Jonathan Winters, Irwin Corey, Jackie Vernon, and many others, reunited in 1981 for a one-night performance, which also featured film of the late Lenny Bruce. The event was captured for the nationally televised documentary Hungry I Reunion, produced and directed by Thomas A. Cohen and featuring reminiscences by Bill Cosby, as well as by Maya Angelou, who had performed there early in her career as a singer.

== Strip club ==
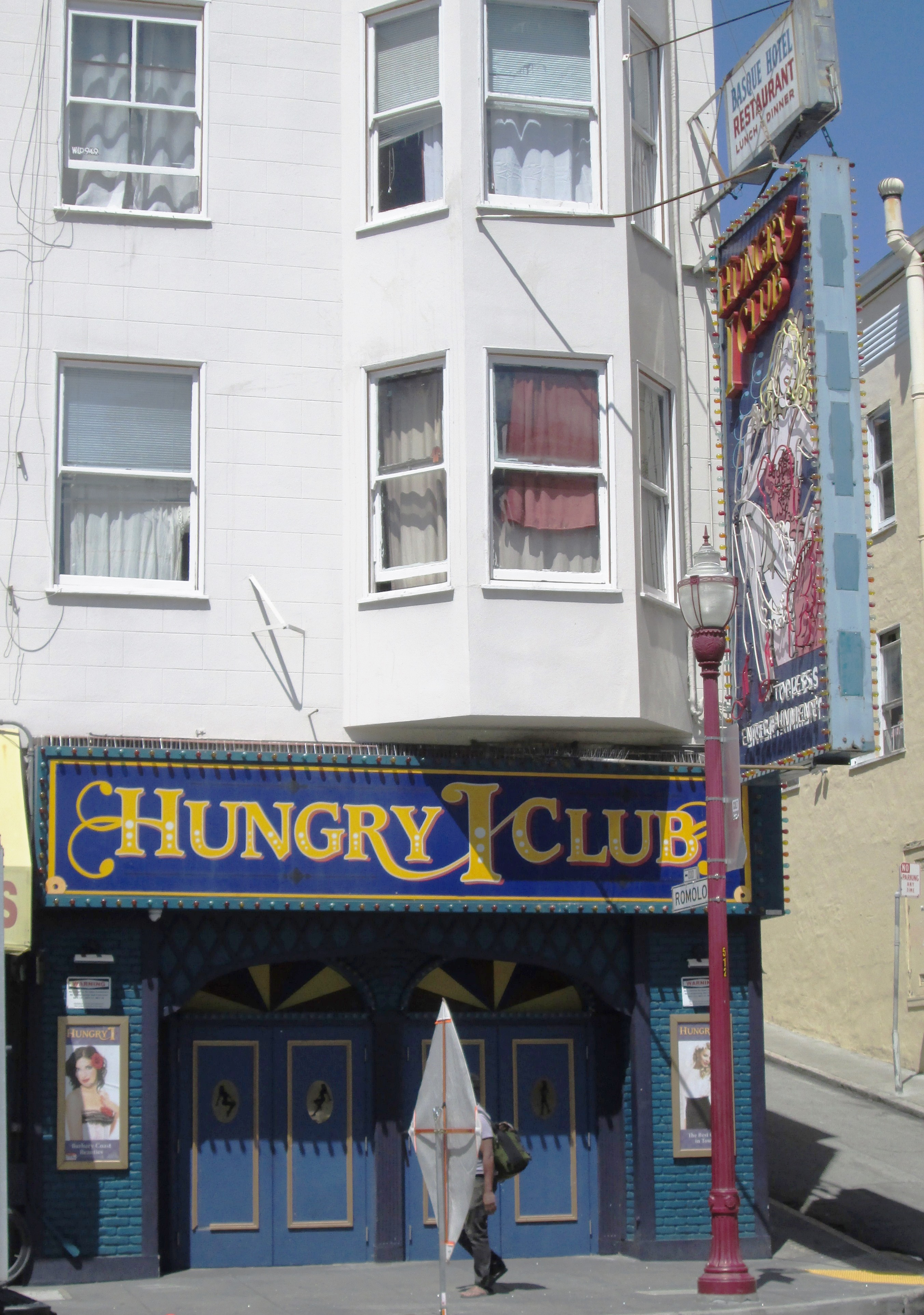
The then-current strip club at 546 Broadway (2017)

In the late 1960s, clubs along the Broadway strip began to transform into fully nude strip clubs run by a consortium of club owners. As the Hungry I was shutting down in its final location at Ghirardelli Square, Banducci sold the rights to its name and logo to this consortium. One of the clubs, Pierre's at 546 Broadway, was promptly renamed "Hungry I Club" and continued to operate as a strip club under various owners, until 2019.

== Exhibition ==
An exhibition on the history of the Hungry I opened March 28, 2007 at the San Francisco Performing Arts Library, now the Museum of Performance & Design, and was on view through August 25, 2007. Alumni who performed at the Hungry I during its heyday—as well as club owner Enrico Banducci and his daughter—gathered for an opening celebration March 27. Among those reminiscing about their appearances at the club were Orson Bean, Shelley Berman, Father Malcolm Boyd, Travis Edmonson, Tom Lehrer, The Kingston Trio, Mort Sahl, Ronnie Schell, and Glenn Yarborough.

== Radio ==
In the 1950s, San Francisco radio station KGO-AM broadcast several talk shows live before an audience from the Hungry I, hosted by Les Crane.

In the early 1960s, Ira Blue broadcast on KGO AM, nightly, from the Hungry I.

Mort Sahl was KGO's overnight announcer in the 1950s.

== See also ==
- The Purple Onion
- List of strip clubs
