= Mario Montez =

Puerto Rican actor

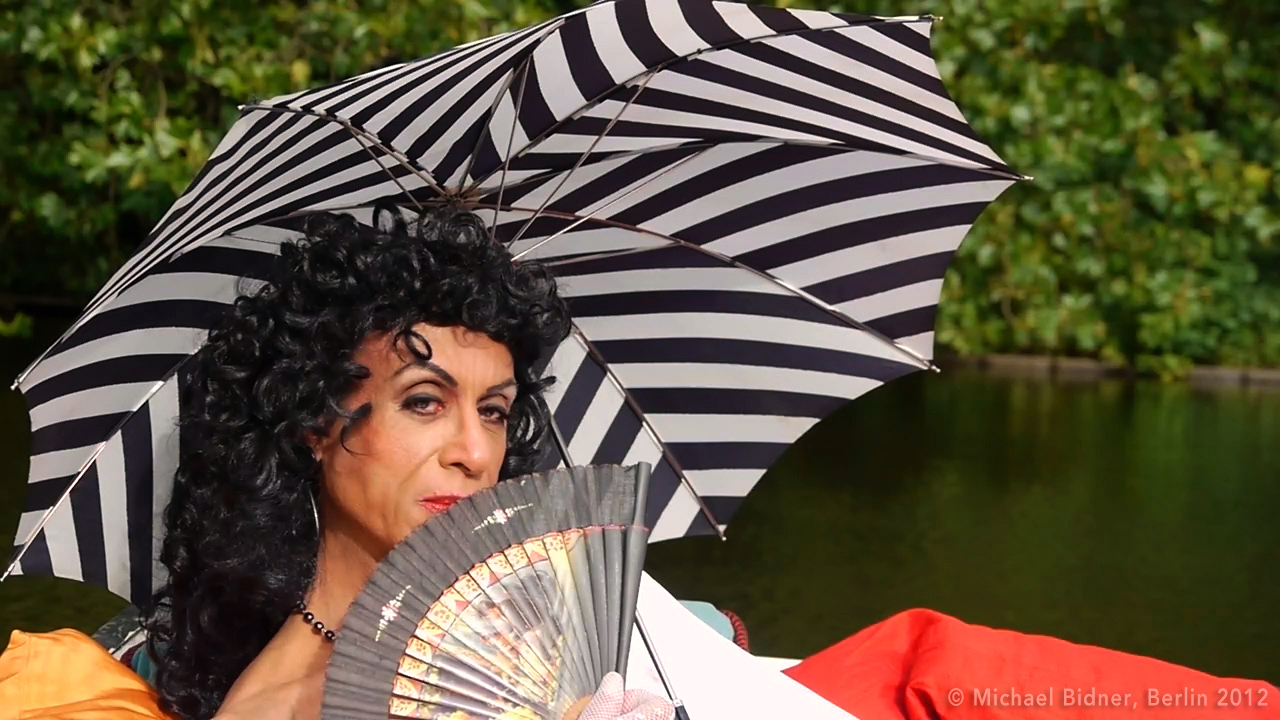
- Still shot of Mario Montez from the short film "A Lazy Summer Afternoon" by John Heys
- Born: René Rivera; July 20, 1935; Ponce, Puerto Rico
- Died: September 26, 2013 (aged 78); Key West, Florida
- Education: Self-taught
- Movement: Pop art

René Rivera (July 20, 1935 – September 26, 2013), known professionally as Mario Montez, was one of the Warhol superstars, appearing in thirteen of Andy Warhol's underground films from 1964 to 1966. He took his name as a male homage to the actress Maria Montez, an important gay icon in the 1950s and 1960s. Before appearing in Warhol's films, he appeared in Jack Smith's underground films Flaming Creatures and Normal Love. Montez also stars in the Ron Rice film Chumlum, made in 1964. Mario Montez, was "a staple in the New York underground scene of the 1960s and '70s."

== Early years ==
Montez was born René Rivera in Ponce, Puerto Rico, in 1935. When he was 8, the family moved to East Harlem where he grew up. In New York, he studied print and graphic arts but worked in clerical jobs.

== Acting career ==
A cross dresser and drag queen, he took his name from the 1940s Hollywood starlet María Montez. His acting career started somewhat by chance when he met avant-garde filmmaker Jack Smith, who included him in his 1963 underground classic Flaming Creatures. Montez did not attend acting school, instead he admits he learned acting "from watching old movies".

Warhol gave Montez the "superstar" status he bestowed on his protégés, but in spite of working in many of his films, Montez never developed a close relationship with the famously laconic Warhol. Montez was also a co-founder of Charles Ludlam's Ridiculous Theatrical Company, which rehearsed at Montez's loft in SoHo.

== Retirement from the film industry ==
In January 1977, Montez moved to Orlando, Florida. After moving to Florida, he quit entertainment altogether and remained out of the public eye until 2006 when he appeared in a documentary about filmmaker Jack Smith. In Florida, he returned to working clerical jobs.

== Honors ==
In March 2010, Montez was honored by Columbia University's Center for the Study of Ethnicity and Race: "Mario is considered one of the most gifted performers of the underground period." In February 2012, Montez was honored with the Special Teddy Award 2012 at the Berlinale for his outstanding role in underground film history. "Mario was the first Superstar ever and the queen mom of all drag queens" John Waters in his laudation at the Teddy Award Ceremony 2012.

== Death ==
He died of a stroke in 2013.

== Filmography ==
=== Directed by Jack Smith ===
- Flaming Creatures, 1962-63 (as Dolores Flores)
- Normal Love, 1963–65
- The Borrowed Tambourine, 1967
- Reefers of Technicolor Island/Jungle Island, 1967
- No President, 1967-1970s

=== Directed by Ron Rice ===
- Chumlum, 1963

=== Directed by Andy Warhol ===
- Mario Banana No. 1, 1964
- Mario Banana No. 2, 1964
- Batman Dracula, 1964 (unfinished)
- Mario Montez Dances, 1964
- Harlot, 1964
- Screen Test No. 2, 1965
- Mario Montez [Screen Tests Portrait], 1965
- Camp, 1965
- More Milk, Yvette, 1965
- Mario Montez and Boy, 1965
- Hedy, 1966
- Ari and Mario, 1966
- Bufferin Commercial, 1966
- The Chelsea Girls, 1966

=== Directed by Piero Heliczer ===
- Dirt, 1965
- Satisfaction

=== Directed by Bill Vehr ===
- Avocada, 1965
- Brothel, 1966
- Waiting for Sugar
- The Mystery of the Spanish Lady
- M. M. for M. M., 1967 (unfinished, lost)

=== Directed by José Rodriguez-Soltero ===
- Life, Death and Assumption of Lupe Vélez, 1966

=== Directed by Frank Simon ===
- The Queen, 1968 (cameo)

=== Directed by Avery Willard ===
- Flaming Twenties, 1968
- The Gypsy's Ball, 1969

=== Directed by Takahiko Iimura ===
- Face, 1969

=== Directed by Roberts Blossom ===
- Movie, 196?

=== Directed by Alfredo Leonardi ===
- Occhio privato sul nuovo mondo, 1970

=== Directed by Helio Oiticica ===
- Agripina é Roma-Manhattan, 1972 (unfinished)

=== Directed by Leandro Katz ===
- Reel Six, Charles Ludlam's Grand Tarot, 1987

=== Directed by Mary Jordan ===
- Jack Smith and the Destruction of Atlantis, 2006

=== Directed by Conrad Ventur ===
- Mario Banana, 2010
- Mario Montez [Screen Test Portrait], 2010
- Atlantis, 2011
- Boca Chica, 2013

=== Directed by John Edward Heys ===
- A Lazy Summer Afternoon with Mario Montez, 2011

== Plays ==
- Conquest of the Universe or When Queens Collide, 1967
- Bluebeard, 1970
- Vain Victory, 1971

== Awards ==
- 2012: Special Teddy
