= Normal Love =

- Directed by: Jack Smith
- Starring: Mario Montez; Diana Baccus; David Sachs; Angus MacLise; Francis Francine; Beverly Grant; Tony Conrad
- Running time: 120 minutes
- Country: United States
- Language: English

Normal Love is an experimental film project by American director Jack Smith. It shows the adventures of an ensemble of glamorously dressed monsters. Smith filmed the project in 1963 and began screening the work in pieces in 1964.

Although Normal Love was never completed, works by Ron Rice, Andy Warhol, and Tony Conrad grew out of it. After Smith's death, the project was released as a two-hour presentation of his footage.

== Plot ==
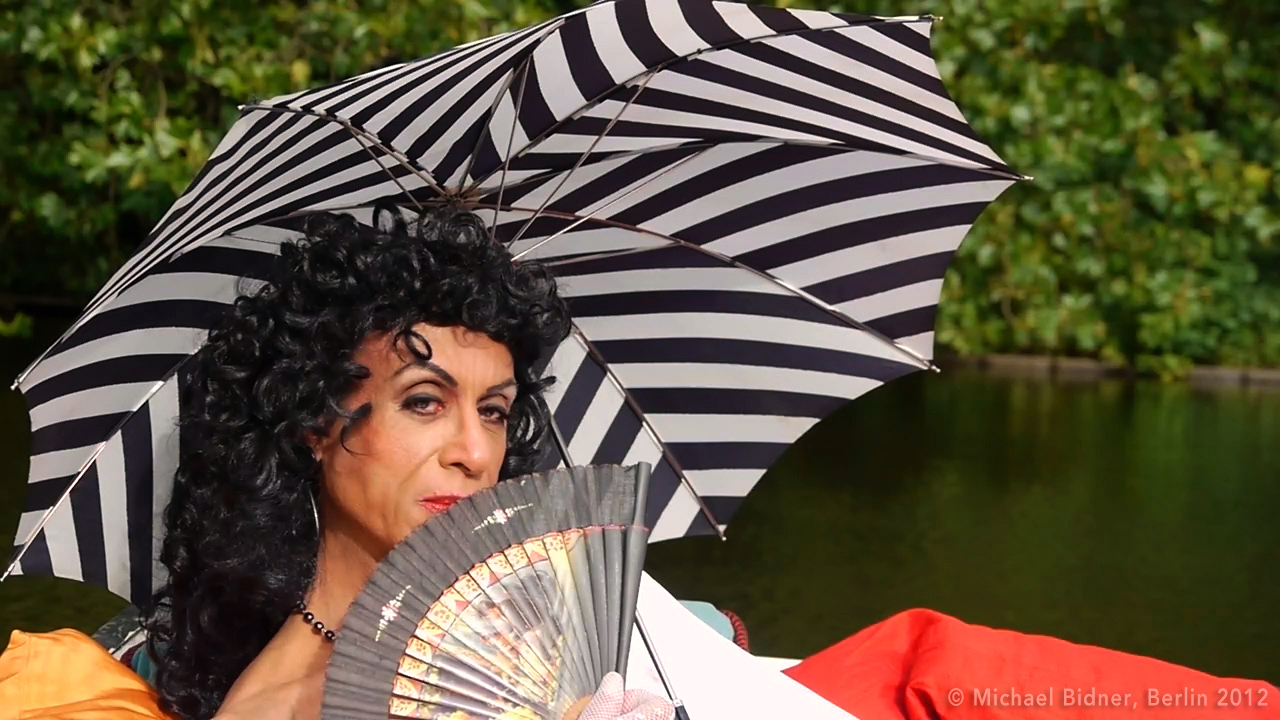
Mario Montez was cast as a mermaid in the film.

Smith broke the film into six sequences. They follow a very loose plot without a clear narrative progression.

The red scene shows the Mermaid languishing indoors. In the swing scene, the Watermelon Man pursues a girl through foliage. When he catches up to her, he pushes her on a swing and they play with a sparkler. In the swamp scene, the girl is pursued by Uncle Pasty, whom she fends off by slamming a pie in his face. The Werewolf rises from the water and traps the Mermaid. After failing to carry her away, he instead offers her a soda.

In the green scene, a group of characters relax on a dock, and the Mongolian Child strokes a skull. A violinist performs as the Cobra Woman dances with her cobra. In the party scene, the characters move to a cow pasture and the Mermaid enjoys a milk bath. In the cake scene, a group of people dance on top of a large cake from which the Pink Faery emerges. The Mummy appears and attacks the dancers until the Mongolian Child shoots the other characters and climbs to the top of the cake.

== Cast ==
- Mario Montez as the Mermaid
- Diana Baccus as the Girl
- David Sachs as the Mongolian Child
- Angus MacLise as a Mummy
- Beverly Grant as the Cobra Woman
- Naomi Levine as the Spider
- Francis Francine as the Cake Girl
- Tony Conrad as a Mummy
- Tiny Tim as the Gilded Hag
- Sheila Bick as the Cobra Lady
- Eliot Cukor as the Werewolf
- John Vaccaro as the White Bat
- Joan Adler as Chorus Cutie
- Diane di Prima as the Pregnant Cutie
- Alex Mead as a Mummy
- Arnold Rockwood as Uncle Pasty
- Teddy Howard as Watermelon Man
- Johnny Foster as Pool Creature
- Andy Warhol appeared in the Cake sequence

== Production ==
=== Filming ===
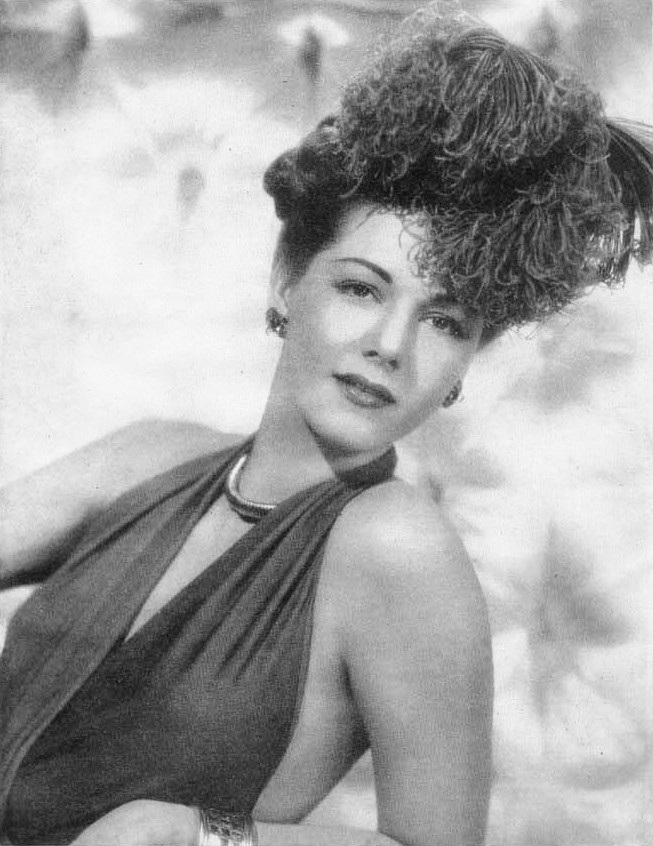
A shrine to Smith's muse Maria Montez appears in the film.

After the scandal produced by his previous film Flaming Creatures, Jack Smith sought to make a more approachable follow-up. He began shooting under the working title The Great Pasty Triumph. Smith wrote out a detailed plan for shooting the film but kept it hidden from cast and crew members during production. Jonas Mekas supplied him with color film and funded the film processing. Smith held shoots over the course of a year. He would often spend hours on makeup and costumes for the cast, slowly immersing them in the reality of the film.

Smith was well known as a devotee of Hollywood studio actress Maria Montez. He told of an account that she had kept a statue of her patron saint in a private chapel and spoke to it daily, demanding that it bring her fortune and admiration. Smith emulated this and built an altar to Montez, where he prayed to her daily, in an apartment on 14th Street, Manhattan. This shrine became the set for the interior scenes of Normal Love, featuring drag queen Mario Montez.

The film's cake sequence was shot in August 1963 at Eleanor Ward's summer home in Old Lyme, Connecticut. Sculptor Claes Oldenburg designed a large wooden cake on which the actors could dance. Additional filming happened at socialite Isabel Eberstadt's home in Cherry Grove.

=== Cinematography ===
Teddy Howard (left) and Diana Baccus (right) in the second section of Normal Love. Their figures are obscured by branches, pink-and-green patterned fabric, and smoke from a sparkler.

Smith used a pink and green color scheme for Normal Love, giving the film a pastoral quality. He was particularly interested in how Baroque painters like Jean-Antoine Watteau used color. Smith would sometimes paint the animals or foliage where he was filming. He created dense compositions using smoke, vegetation, or fabric that allow the actors to blend into the set design. Much of the film's aesthetic is influenced by White Savage, a 1943 adventure film starring Maria Montez.

=== Soundtrack ===
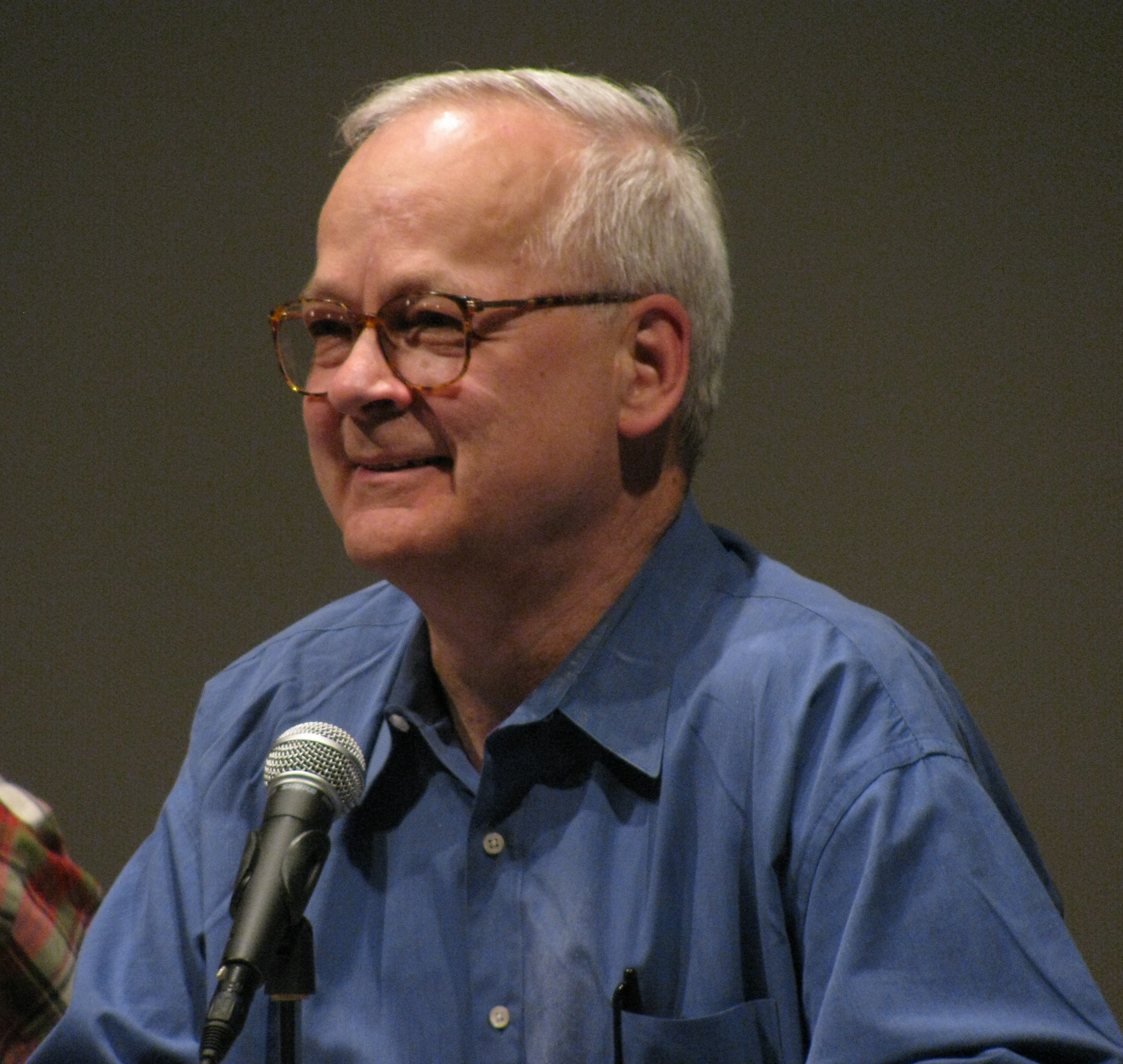
Tony Conrad worked on the film's unfinished soundtrack.

Smith did not record sync sound for Normal Love and enlisted Tony Conrad to produce the soundtrack. Conrad had made the soundtrack for Flaming Creatures and appears in Normal Love as the mummy. Smith's cue sheet for Conrad specifies African drums and joyful classical music in the swing scene, as well as the sound of insects, birds, and frogs for the swamp and party scenes. Smith also planned to incorporate popular music into the soundtrack; his notes specify Hoagy Carmichael's "The Monkey Song" and Patsy Cline's "Walkin' After Midnight", and Amália Rodrigues. In October 1963, he posted a notice in The Village Voice announcing a competition. He called for contestants to submit recordings in the style of Maria Montez saying, "Every time I look into the mirror I could scream because I am so beautiful."

On set, Conrad met actress Beverly Grant, who played the Cobra Woman. The two entered a relationship, which Smith regarded as a betrayal against him. Smith and Conrad fell out, and the soundtrack was not created. Angus MacLise and Walter De Maria have performed live accompaniment when sequences from the film were screened.

== Release ==
Smith was worried that his work would be reproduced or co-opted, so he left Normal Love as a work in progress. While the film was still in production, Smith arranged screenings of the rushes. From 1963 to 1965, he unveiled rushes and rough cuts at the Film-Makers' Cinematheque and at Ron Rice's loft. He would often edit the film from the projection booth at screenings. By removing the projector's takeup reel, he could use tape to re-splice the footage while the projector was running. This technique allowed Smith to extend the duration of the screenings, which could run as long as four hours. He also experimented with flipping the filmstrip so that repeated images would appear reversed from left to right. When the light from the projector hit the film base before the emulsion, it produced images with dimmer, murkier colors.

=== Restoration ===
After Smith's death, filmmaker Jerry Tartaglia worked on the preservation and restoration of Normal Love. Because Smith had integrated material from Normal Love into other films and performance pieces, it was scattered across many reels. Tartaglia used written notes and verbal accounts of the film to identify the images. Smith's continual re-editing physically damaged much of the film.

To reassemble the footage, Tartaglia worked off of a copy of Smith's outline that Conrad had made along with a cue sheet that Conrad had prepared for the soundtrack. The soundtrack consists of records that Smith owned, many of which Smith played when presenting the sequences.

== Related works ==
=== Jack Smith ===
Yellow Sequence is a 15-minute addendum to Normal Love, taking its name from notes by Smith. It stars Francis Francine, Tiny Tim, and David Sachs. In the sequence, Francine dies in a field of golden flowers as Tiny Tim plays a plastic ukulele while perched on top of an abandoned car. Francine's scenes were shot first, and the additional scenes were added after the film reels went missing. Because Yellow Sequence does not appear in Smith's chronology notes, Tartaglia decided to keep it separate from the rest of the Normal Love sequences, and many screenings include it as an epilogue. Smith also added unused footage from Normal Love to his 1966 short film Respectable Creatures.

During the late 1960s, Smith began using footage shot for Normal Love as part of theater and performance works. Performance reels for both Exotic Landlordism and Cement Lagoon include images ostensibly not intended for inclusion in Normal Love.

=== Other filmmakers ===
One of Andy Warhol's earliest films was Andy Warhol Films Jack Smith Filming "Normal Love", a four-minute silent newsreel showing the production of Normal Love. The film screened with Smith's Flaming Creatures at the New Bowery Theater. During the program's third screening on March 3, 1964, the New York City Police Department seized both films, charging the theater staff with showing an obscene film. The convictions were overturned on appeal, but police did not return the only print of Warhol's film, and it is now considered lost.

Filmmaker Ron Rice often accompanied Smith to the shoots for Normal Love. Smith and the cast members sometimes congregated at Rice's loft after shooting was complete, still in their costumes from the film. Rice documented these visits in his 1963 film Chumlum.

In March 1963, Smith, Conrad, and Montez experimented with projecting film at a reduced frame rate to produce a flicker effect. Impressed by the results, Smith planned on incorporating this technique into Normal Love. After Conrad and Smith fell out, the flicker effects that Conrad had devised eventually led to his abstract film The Flicker.
