= Taylor Mead =

American writer (1924–2013)

- Born: December 31, 1924; Grosse Pointe, Michigan, U.S.
- Died: May 8, 2013 (aged 88); Denver, Colorado, U.S.
- Occupations: Actor; writer; performer

Taylor Mead (December 31, 1924 – May 8, 2013) was an American writer, actor and performer. Mead appeared in several of Andy Warhol's underground films filmed at Warhol's Factory, including Tarzan and Jane Regained... Sort of (1963) and Taylor Mead's Ass (1964).

== Career ==
Born in Detroit, Michigan and raised by divorced parents mostly in the wealthy suburb of Grosse Pointe, he appeared in Ron Rice's beat classic The Flower Thief (1960), in which he "traipses with elfin glee through a lost San Francisco of smoke-stuffed North Beach cafés ..." Film critic P. Adams Sitney called The Flower Thief "the purest expression of the Beat sensibility in cinema." Village Voice film critic J. Hoberman called Mead "the first underground movie star."

In 1967, Taylor Mead played a part in the surrealistic play Desire Caught by the Tail by Pablo Picasso when it was set for the first time in France at a festival in Saint-Tropez, among others with Ultra Violet.

In the mid-1970s, Gary Weis made some short films of Mead talking to his cat in the kitchen of his Ludlow Street apartment on Manhattan's Lower East Side called Taylor Mead's Cat. One film of Mead extemporizing on the virtues of constant television watching aired during the first season of Saturday Night Live. He also appeared in films by Rosa von Praunheim, for example in 1979 in Tally Brown, New York. Mead was friend with both (the director and Tally Brown).

In 1995, Mead spent eight hours a day for a week at the Bon Temps bar, New Orleans, being documented in the photobooth costumed as a series of Warholian characters for Blake Nelson Boyd's documentary Photobooth Trilogy. Characters included Superman and Mickey Mouse from Warhol's Myth series and references to Mead's performances in Lonesome Cowboys and Nude Restaurant.

While living on Ludlow Street, Mead read his poetry regularly at The Bowery Poetry Club. His first book of poems, "Taylor Mead on Amphetamines and in Europe", was written in 1968 (Republished by the Taylor Mead Estate, September 2015) His last book of poems (published by Bowery Poetry Books) is called A Simple Country Girl. He was the subject of William A. Kirkley's documentary Excavating Taylor Mead, which debuted at the Tribeca Film Festival in 2005. The film shows him engaging in his nightly habit of feeding stray cats in an East Village cemetery after bar-hopping, and features a cameo by Jim Jarmusch, in which Jarmusch explains that once, when Mead went to Europe, he enlisted Jarmusch's brother to feed the cemetery cats in Mead's absence.

Mead appeared in the final segment of Jarmusch's 2003 film Coffee and Cigarettes. He has been "a beloved icon of the downtown New York art scene since the 60s."

Mead appeared at the Yerba Buena Center for the Arts in San Francisco, from September 18 to 21, 2008, for a series of three films (The Flower Thief, Lonesome Cowboys, and Excavating Taylor Mead) .

== Death ==
Mead was displaced from Ludlow Street in April 2013, receiving a settlement to move out, after many years of a dispute with his landlord. He lived with his niece, Priscilla Mead, in Denver and was planning to return to New Orleans on May 21 to prepare for the opening of his exhibition at the Boyd Satellite Gallery on Julia Street in that city, but he died on May 8, 2013, in Denver. He was 88.

== Filmography ==
- The Flower Thief (1960, directed by Ron Rice) - Flower Thief
- Passion in a Seaside Slum (1962, Short, directed by Bob Chatterton)
- Lemon Hearts (1962, Short, directed by Vernon Zimmerman)
- Too Young, Too Immoral (1962, directed by Raymond Phelan) - Scribbles
- Hallelujah the Hills (1963, directed by Adolfas Mekas) - Convict II
- Tarzan and Jane Regained...Sort Of (1963, directed by Andy Warhol) - Tarzan
- Babo 73 (1964, directed by Robert Downey, Sr.) - President Sandy Studsbury
- Couch (1964, directed by Andy Warhol) - Himself
- Taylor Mead's Ass (1964, directed by Andy Warhol) - Himself
- Le Désir attrapé par la queue (1964, directed by Jean-Jacques Lebel)
- The Nude Restaurant (1967, directed by Andy Warhol) - Harmonica Player
- Imitation of Christ (1967, directed by Andy Warhol) - Hobo
- **** (1967, directed by Andy Warhol)
- European Diary (1967, director)
- The Illiac Passion (1967, directed by Gregory Markopoulos) - The Demon or Sprite
- Dialogue with Che (1968, directed by José Rodriguez-Soltero) - CIA Agent
- The Bizarre Ones (1968, directed by Henri Pachard)
- Lonesome Cowboys (1967, directed by Andy Warhol) - Nurse
- San Diego Surf (1968, directed by Andy Warhol) - Mr. Mead
- Midnight Cowboy (1969, directed by John Schlesinger) - The Party No. 5
- The Secret Life of Hernando Cortez (1968, directed by John Chamberlain)
- Brand X (1970, directed by Wynn Chamberlain) - Viewer / President / Minster / Nurse
- Cleopatra (1970, directed by Michel Auder)
- Up Your Legs Forever (1971, directed by John Lennon and Yoko Ono) - Himself
- Hit Squad (1976, directed by Bruno Corbucci) - Crazy man in New York (uncredited)
- Messalina, Messalina! (1977, directed by Bruno Corbucci) - (uncredited)
- Brothers Till We Die (1978, directed by Umberto Lenzi) - Mentally ill Man (uncredited)
- Feedback (1978, directed by Bill Doukas)
- Tally Brown, New York (1979, documentary, directed by Rosa von Praunheim) - Himself
- Union City (1980, directed by Marcus Reichert) - Mentally ill Man (uncredited)
- Underground U.S.A. (1980, directed by Eric Mitchell) - The uncle
- No Such Thing As Gravity (1989, directed by Alyce Wittenstein)
- C'est vrai! (One Hour) (1990, directed by Robert Frank)
- Buster's Bedroom (1991, directed by Rebecca Horn) - James
- Shadows in the City (1991, directed by Ari M. Roussimoff) - Father
- Last Supper (1992, directed by Robert Frank)
- Natural Born Crazies (1994, directed by George Baluzy)
- Taylor Mead Unleashed (1996, directed by Sebastian Piras)
- Ecstasy in Entropy (1999, Short, directed by Nick Zedd)
- Citizen Toxie: The Toxic Avenger IV (2000, directed by Lloyd Kaufman)
- Coffee and Cigarettes (2003, directed by Jim Jarmusch) - Taylor (segment "Champagne") (voice)
- Excavating Taylor Mead (2005, Short, directed by William A. Kirkley) - Himself
- Electra Elf: The Beginning (2005, directed by Nick Zedd)
- Man Under Wire (2005, directed by Josh Bishop)
- Nubile Nuisance (2006, directed by David B. Wilson) - Father Jocasta
- The Party in Taylor Mead's Kitchen (2011, directed by Jeffrey Wengrofsky)§
- Toilet Gator (2017, directed by Jonathan M. Parisen) - Bar act
- Queen of Sheba Meets the Atom Man (2018, directed by Ron Rice) - The Atom Man (final film role)
