= Camp (1965 film) =

- Directed by: Andy Warhol
- Produced by: Andy Warhol
- Starring: Baby Jane Holzer; Gerard Malanga; Tally Brown; Mario Montez
- Production company: Andy Warhol Films
- Distributed by: The Factory
- Release date: October 1965
- Running time: 67 minutes
- Country: United States
- Language: English

Camp is a 1965 feature-length underground film directed by Andy Warhol at The Factory in New York City.

== Plot ==
The film follows the format of a variety show. After being introduced, people act and perform for a specific period. The performers are listed in the program in order of appearance as Baby Jane Holzer, Paul Swan, Mario Montez, Mar-Mar, Jody Babb, Tally Brown, Jack Smith, Fufu Smith, Donyale Luna, Tosh Carillo, and the host, Gerard Malanga.

== See also ==
- Andy Warhol filmography
