= The Queen of Sheba Meets the Atom Man =

- Directed by: Ron Rice
- Starring: Winifred Bryan; Taylor Mead
- Distributed by: The Film-Makers' Cooperative
- Release date: 1963
- Running time: 109 minutes
- Country: United States
- Language: English

The Queen of Sheba Meets the Atom Man is a 1963 American experimental film directed by Ron Rice. It stars Winifred Bryan as the Queen of Sheba and Taylor Mead as the Atom Man. Featured players are Ron Rice, Julian Beck, Judith Malina, Jack Smith, and Jonas Mekas.

== Summary ==
A violent but sincere protest against the industrial world, Atom Man (Mead) is a mischief maker (sometimes wearing a Chaplinesque bowler hat) who can be seen having fun with Vaseline and Ajax or wandering about in New York.

== Production ==
Rice shot The Queen of Sheba Meets the Atom Man on 16 mm film starting in 1962. It was notable for recording Central Park, Grand Central Terminal and the New York waterfront of that era. Scenes of the Atom Man were shot at the Union Carbide Building, where an exhibit on the "World of the Future" had models explaining atomic energy.

Rice put together a rough cut of the film. At a 1963 benefit to raise funds, he screened over 100 minutes of a purported 3 hours total. Rice died before the editing was complete, so Anthology Film Archives commissioned Mead to finish the film in the early 1980s. The film was restored by Anthology in 2018.
