= Bill Flowers (artist) =

Australian artist (born 1963)

Bill Flowers (born in 1963, in Tasmania, Australia) an Australian painter, printmaker, cartoonist, animator & snake wrangler who lives in Ulverstone, Tasmania. The Lowbrow artworks of Flowers consist of wildlife based works and cartoon animations.

Flowers was a figure in the Australian comic art scene of the 1990s. Flowers created 'The Cat' for Southern Aurora Comics and 'Father Rice the fearless vampire slayer' The Father Rice comics went on to be short films for the Off Planet Films 'Drakenstien' and 'Albino Santa Cop'.

Bill Flowers(II) and Tom Priestley developed a style of animation that lead to first place in 2004 Trasharama A-Go-Go.

His paintings include subjects such as snakes, Tasmanian Devils, and other predators, often getting close to his subjects in the wild.

In December 2010 Flowers exhibited a painting that caused local controversy among church leaders in Tasmania, as it depicted Tasmanian devils posed as the famous Last Supper painting. The title of the painting was I hope this is not their last supper and was meant to be an environmental statement about the endangered Tasmanian devil population.

In 2015, he exhibited a series of paintings made at sea, 'Castaways on Preservation Island', at the Bass Strait Maritime Centre.
