= Eric Nord =

American writer (1919–1989)

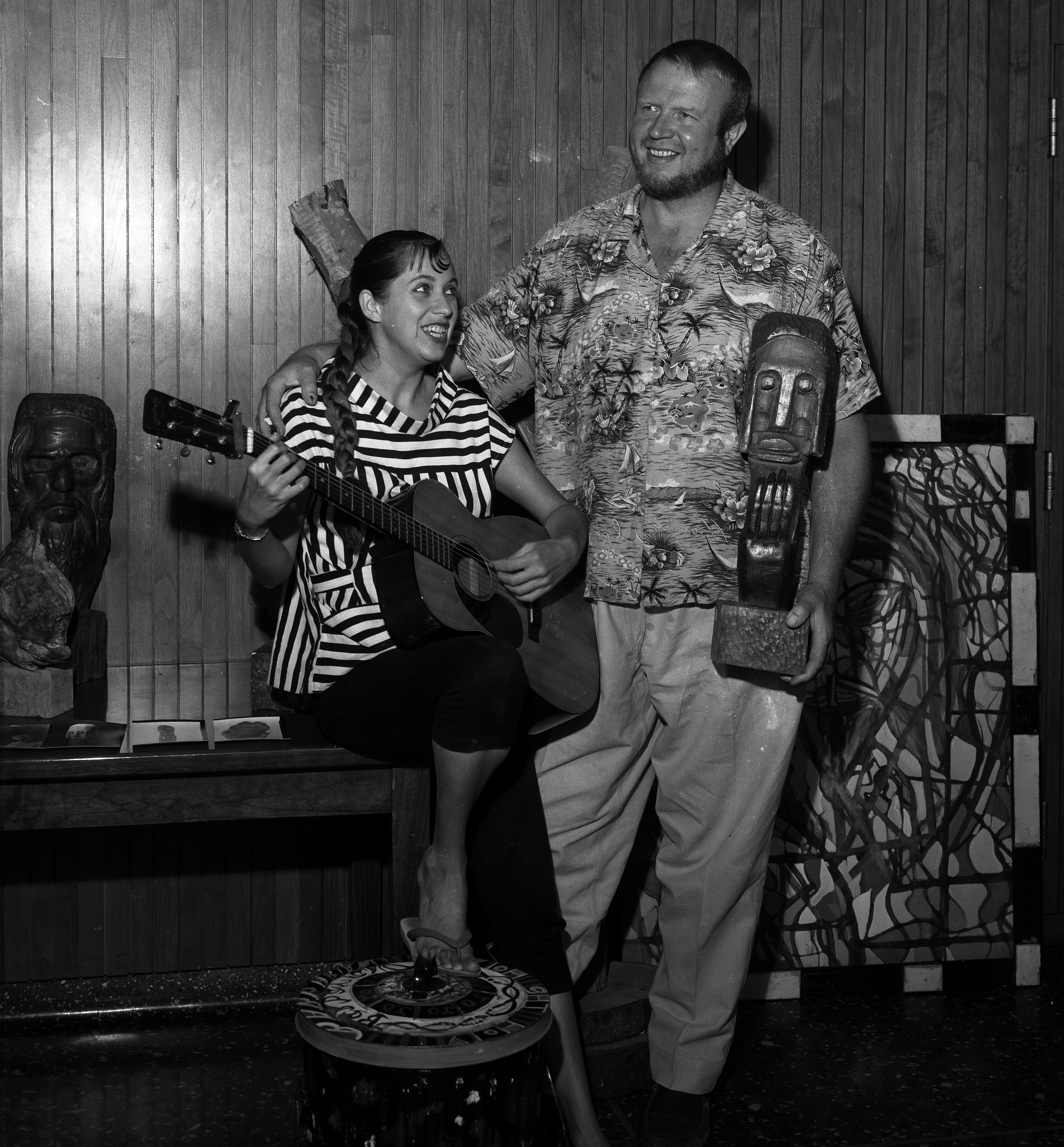
- Eric "Big Daddy" Nord and Julie Meredith at a Police Commission entertainment license hearing for The Gas House, 1959
- Born: Harry Helmuth Pastor; 1919; Krefeld, Germany
- Died: 1989 (aged 69–70); San Jose, California, U.S.
- Other name: Big Daddy
- Occupations: Club owner, poet, actor

Eric "Big Daddy" Nord (1919–1989) was a Beat Generation coffeehouse and nightclub owner, poet, actor, and hipster. Newspaper columnist Herb Caen called him the "King of the Beatniks." Corpulent, standing 6 feet 7 inches tall, Nord was the face of the Beat generation to San Francisco and Los Angeles newspaper readers in the late 1950s and the founder of the hungry i nightclub.

== Early life and education ==
Nord was born Harry Helmuth Pastor in Krefeld, Germany to Dorothea, an American, and Carl Theodore Pastor, a German. As a child, he often accompanied his father on business trips to the United States. His parents divorced in 1920, and when he was 19, he left Germany in 1938.

He studied acting in Los Angeles and took the stage name of Eric Nord. While in Los Angeles, he frequented Agape Lodge of Ordo Templi Orientis, where he studied Aleister Crowley's new religious movement, Thelema, in association with JPL rocket engineer Jack Parsons. He was initiated into the Order at Agape Lodge on December 5, 1942. Lodge records indicate that his brother, Carl Rudolf Pastor, was initiated a week later on December 12, 1942.

== Career ==
In 1943, Nord moved to San Francisco. Shortly after his arrival there, he met and married Mary Hollister with whom he had three or four children, including Carl Paul Pastor. However, Mary left him within a few years.

In the early 1950s, Nord sometimes worked at the Co-Existence Bagel Shop (the self-described "Gateway to Beatnik Land"), a popular hangout in North Beach. (in Bagel Shop Jazz, the poet Bob Kaufman called its patrons "...shadow people...mulberry-eyed girls in black stockings, smelling vaguely of mint jelly…turtle neck angel guys..."). In 1950, Nord rented a basement in North beach where he and a growing number of young people, aspiring beatniks, hung out. He called the place the "hungry i" nightclub. Enrico Banducci later took over club and it became the cradle of stand-up comedy.

In June 1958, on orders from San Francisco mayor George Christopher to crack down on drug use and delinquency in North Beach, San Francisco police raided Nord's Party Pad club and arrested him for operating a public dance without a license. Later that summer, on August 8, in an article titled "Schoolgirl Lost in Beatnik Land", San Francisco Chronicle readers learned that two high school girls in Eric "Big Daddy" Nord's production of Archy and Mehitabel had disappeared after the previous night's performance. Chronicle readers learned how Nord and another man had taken the girls on a car trip. Nord, driving his Oldsmobile at the end of a beatnik procession, saying his interest in the girls was only fatherly, turned himself in at the Hall of Justice. His much-publicized trial ended in December, when he was fined $300 and given three years' probation. Said the presiding judge, "You and your friends in Beatnikland emphasize your unusual ways to give an impression that you have talent, ability and stature, when actually a person looking into you finds no talent at all." Later, the same judge overturned his own verdict.

After his 1958 trial, Nord declared bankruptcy, moved to Venice, Los Angeles, California. In 1959, he opened the Gas House in Venice, a beat hangout in a former homeless haven, and earlier, a fashionable beachfront drugstore. The Gas House was a café that soon became popular with Los Angeles beatniks and poets, who read their work alongside Nord. The Gas House was used as the setting for a cult horror film called The Hypnotic Eye (1960) that featured Nord as a bongo-playing beatnik. The role helped to launch Nord's brief film career. Nord's Gas House existed for three years as a place where writers and musicians could not only live but also entertain, until neighbors complained about the noise, and Nord was forced to seek an entertainment license, which was denied.

He moved to Hawaii in the 1960s, but returned after a short stay. “I was involved in a multimillion-dollar health spa but I got a virus," he explained. He also became involved with a vegetarian group that sought to establish a colony in Guatemala but the effort was cut short by a revolution, friends said.

In the Fall of 1965, Nord, proprietor of a coffee house, the Sticky Wicket in Aptos, also opened The Barn (1965—1968), an art gallery and coffee house, with a large area for concerts, on the site of the Frapwell Dairy Barn (1914—1948), in Scotts Valley. Janis Joplin and the Grateful Dead performed at The Barn. Tom Wolfe describes the Merry Pranksters and Ken Kesey, from La Honda, at The Barn, in the last chapter of The Electric Kool-Aid Acid Test.

In the early 1970s, he operated a "cultural center" in San Francisco's Haight Ashbury neighborhood. In 1972, he appeared as the character 'God' in a San Francisco underground photo-comic titled SuperJesus now rated an underground comix classic. He moved to Los Gatos in 1975.

He died in San Jose, California in 1989.

== Poetry ==
- As He Sees It (Lost Gatos: Free Press, 1968)

== Films ==
- The Flower Thief (1959)
- The Hypnotic Eye (1960)
- Once Upon a Knight (1961)
- Hungry Eye (1971)
- Steel Arena (1973)
