= Trasharama A-Go-Go =

Australian short film festival

Trasharama agogo Short Film Festival
- Official 2017 Trasharama poster
- Status: Active
- Genre: Film festival
- Location: Melbourne Premiere
- Country: Australia
- Website: trasharama.com

Trasharama A-Go-Go is an Australian annual short film festival catering to the low-budget/no-budget end of the movie-market, focusing on genre films (Horror & Sci-fi) under 15 minutes in length. The Festival began 1997, providing emerging horror film makers with a competitive environment to develop their craft and showcase films to audiences, effectively acting as a de facto training ground.

The Festival was conceived by Dick Dale, frontman of Adelaide bands Gacy's Place and Kamikaze. Although having started in Adelaide, South Australia the festival has gained local and national sponsorship allowing it to grow in size and popularity, featuring both national and international submissions and now tours Australia with screenings in most Australian states.

Trasharama A-Go-Go is promoted as "Australia's NASTIEST Short Film FESTERval". Although no festival was held in 2010, the festival returned the following year. Since 2015 the Trasharama agogo film festival has held its annual premiere in conjunction with Melbourne's Monster Fest.

== List of films screened sorted by year ==
1994 – A taste of what was to become the Trasharama festival, one-off screening held at the Crown and Anchor Hotel.

- Blue Dog – Dir. Dick Dale. Followed by performances by local bands Blood Sucking Freaks and Taxed.

1997 – "Trash Film Night" – eleven films from Adelaide and Brisbane, followed by performances by the bands, Blood Sucking Freaks and The Ghouls, screening held at "Mad Love Bar" band venue.
Films screened included:

- Total Recession – Durand Greig
- No Smoking – Warren Mc Carthy & Julian Summers
- Cold Comfort – Kristian Moliere

1998 – "Trash Film Night 2" – Held in Producers Hotel beer garden. Screening of 11 Australian films followed by live performances by the bands Madonna's Armpits and Fear and Loathing.
Films screened included:

- The Creature from Outta Space- Sean Wessex Brown & Justin Peacock
- Attack of the Undead- Peter Spierig
- Vicious Mink- Timothy Spanos & Dean Keep.

1999 – Trasharama A-Go-Go is held at Mercury Cinema in Adelaide, Revolver Nightclub in Melbourne and Side on Cafe in Sydney.
Films screened included:

- Hot Crusty Death- Judd Tilyard
- Blood of a woman- Jonathan Sequeria
- Making a Death Mask- Mark Nichols

2000 – Trasharama A-Go-Go is held at Mercury Cinema in Adelaide, The Zoo in Brisbane, Side on Cafe in Sydney and Revolver in Melbourne.
Films screened included:

- Black Lindy/ White Lindy- Timothy Spanos
- The film John Lennon couldn't make- Rupert Da Costa E Silva
- Zombie Bride Blood Bath- Justin Case

2001
Films screened included:

- Mondo Excreta- Little Clarke May
- Westvale Road- Episode 1 Holy Crap- Dylan Perry
- Rampage of the Undead- Peter Spierig
- Nicholas Dickmuncher- Timothy Spanos

2002 Festival only held in South Australia in 2002, at Mercury Cinema in Adelaide.

- Films shown comprised a "best of" selection from previous years.

2003 Screenings held in Adelaide, Sydney, Melbourne, Brisbane and Perth.
Films screened included:

- The Denim Avenger VS The Undead Bogans – Andy Kite and Rebecca Bogert
- The Twilight of Granitar – Warren Armstrong
- Arakned, Apex of Zombies – Bonnie Hart
- Case #406 – Paul Nicholson
- Bad Company – Aaron Cartwright

2004 Screenings held in Adelaide, Brisbane, Sydney, Melbourne, Perth, Caloundra, Geelong and Newcastle.
Films screened included:

- We Almost Got Shot – Tom Priestley and Bill Flowers
- ZZZZ – James Findley
- Laser Beetles From Venus – Dario Russo
- Head – Peter Duggan
- The Offering – John Anthony Silvestro
- Drop Bears -Brendon Dee
- The Scent of a Man – Shaun Mccarthy
- Pencil Dick – Joe Villanti

2005 Travelled widely around Australia.
Films screened included:

- Best Of 3 – Drew Thompson
- Hair Removal – Troy Gillett
- Return of the Killer Bikini Vampire Girls – John Anthony Silvestro
- Dracenstein – Tom Priestley and Bill Flowers
- Still Born – Emma Mitchell
- A Story, A Song and a Dream – Matt Penney

2006 Travelled widely around Australia.
Films screened included:

- Final Faeces – Frank Daft
- Wok – Mark Alston
- Remake – Kit McDee
- Killer Bikini Vampire Girls Strike Back – John Anthony Silvestro
- The Patrolman – Anthony Marriott & Marc Jager
- The Morning After – Daniel Knight
- Sickie – Stuart Simpson

2007 Travelled widely around Australia.
Films screened included:

- Greedy Guts – Stu Simpson
- Dog Meat – Mat Govoni
- Numb Skulls – Kelly Sheeran
- Foetal Decision – Mitchell Bowker
- Off The Beaten Track – Josh Long
- Killer Bikini Vampire Girls 3: A New Hope – John Anthony Silvestro
- Road Kill – Sam Curtain
- I Piss in Your Eye – Trent Saunders
- The Physique of the Christ – Bill Flowers & Tom Priestley
- Bad Timing – James Teh
- Cheerleader Swapmeat – Steve Kruetzmann & Qtim Broad
- Betty Burgers – Summer DeRoche
- Dan The Dogman – James MacDonald

2008 Travelled widely around Australia.
Films screened included:

- Rabbit Rage (First place)
- Look to the Skies – Liam Jennings & Ben Nichols (Second place)
- Money Shot
- Mooney Street
- The Good Ship Morning Dew
- Death of the Killer Bikini Vampire Girls
- The Life of Piglet
- Look to the Skies
- Stop The Barbies
- Killin' Flies
- Heartbreak Motel
- Do You Have Protection
- Garden of Earthly Delights
- Dr. Poo
- The Day I Got Sacked
- The Box Monster & The Death Bag of Death
- My New Ghoul Friends
- The Love of Victoria Anus – Ari Richards
- The Dog Sex Killer – Frank Daft
- Danny (The Dog Who Farts Fire)
- Family Bizness

2009

- Monster Mash – Timothy Stewart, SA
- The Golden Rule – David Wade, SA
- Dirtbike Dero's – Macho Lama, SA
- Cereal Killer – Daniel Vink, SA
- The Decayed – Josef J Weber, SA
- Vengeance Wears a Tampon – Frank Daft, SA
- The Tramp – Max Miller, Vic
- Gumbys New Tit – Alex Machin, Vic
- Potential Employee – Andrew Dunstan, Vic
- The Body Watchers – Adam Spellicy, Vic
- Hanging at Picnic Rock- Clint Cure, Vic
- The Fish that Eat People – Ross Radiation, NSW
- Attack of the Killer Bananas – Karina Libbey, NSW
- The Bagman Genisus – Kade Ruckman, NSW
- Have Sex and Die! – James Peniata, NSW
- Violet is Dead – Thomas Cruikshank, QLD
- Cravings – Jonathan Jahnke, QLD
- Bound – Marcus Ditzel, QLD
- A Dark Beginning – Aston Wenham, Simon Gill, Stephen Cass, QLD
- Duncan Cunningham's Nightmare – Duncan Cunningham, QLD
- Revenge of the Gnomes – Phillip Nelson, WA
- Trapped – Matt Penny WA
- Granny Basher Stinkweed and the Vic Bitter Bandits – Griff Broham, WA
- Blood Shed – Jason Shipley, Canada
- Mammoth Mammoth – Mat Govoni, Vic
- Botched Eyeball Operation – Clint Enns, Canada
