= J. Hoberman =

American film critic (born 1949)

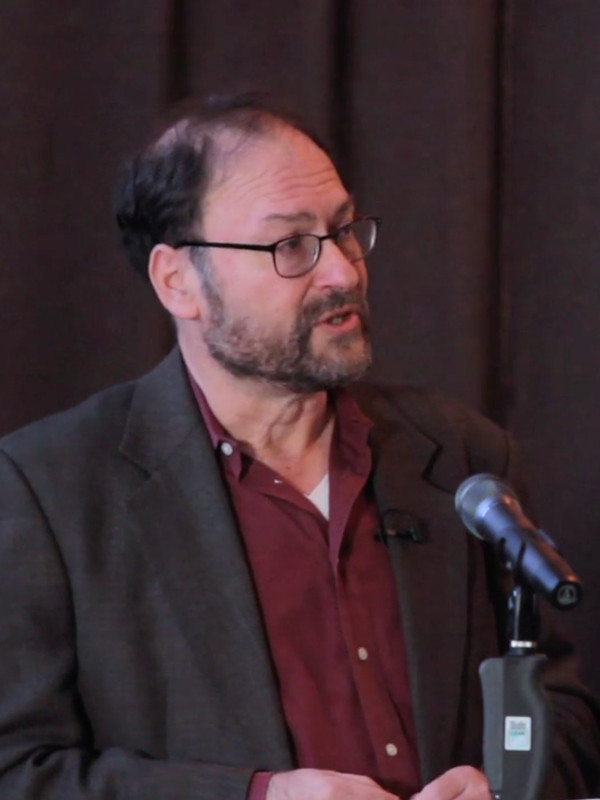
- Hoberman in 2012
- Born: James Lewis Hoberman; March 14, 1949 (age 77); New York City, U.S.
- Education: Binghamton University (BA); Columbia University (MFA)
- Occupations: Film critic; journalist; author; academic
- Children: 2
- Writing career
- Period: 1977–present
- Subject: Film
- Website: j-hoberman.com

James Lewis Hoberman (born March 14, 1949) is an American film critic, journalist, author and academic. He began working at The Village Voice in the 1970s, became a full-time staff writer in 1983, and was the newspaper's senior film critic from 1988 to 2012. In 1981, he coined the term "vulgar modernism" to describe the "looney" fringes of American popular culture (e.g. the animators Tex Avery and Chuck Jones, MAD Magazine, TV pioneer Ernie Kovacs and the films of Frank Tashlin).

== Early and personal life ==
Hoberman was born to a Jewish family in Brooklyn. His ancestors immigrated to the United States from Poland, Ukraine, Austria-Hungary, and Alsace-Lorraine. He grew up primarily in Fresh Meadows, Queens. Hoberman completed his B.A. degree at Binghamton University and his M.F.A. at Columbia University. At Binghamton, prominent experimental filmmaker Ken Jacobs both instructed and influenced him.

Hoberman and his wife, a social worker, married in 1974. They have two daughters. He is an atheist.

== Career ==
After completing his MFA Hoberman worked for The Village Voice under Andrew Sarris. Hoberman specialized in writing about experimental film for the weekly paper: his first published review (in 1977) was of David Lynch's seminal debut film Eraserhead. In the mid-1970s, Hoberman contributed text articles to the underground comix anthology Arcade, edited by Art Spiegelman and Bill Griffith. From 2009 to 2012, Hoberman was the senior film editor at the Village Voice, where he was also an active leader in the staff union.

Hoberman made several short films during the 1970s. Broken Honeymoon #3, originally screened in 1973 and revised in 1978, rearranges footage from an episode of Bewitched. His 1978 film Mission to Mongo explores the connection between popular culture and politics. It uses still images of China, particularly from The Red Lantern and The Red Detachment of Women, and the song "Shanghai Lil" from Footlight Parade, accompanied by text from Karl Marx and Walter Benjamin. Cargo of Lure, made in 1974 and released in 1979, is a single continuous shot showing the Bronx shore from a Circle Line boat. The 1979 film Framed presents footage from a Kodak advertisement, superimposed with quotations from André Bazin and recontextualized by shots of a man holding a picture frame.

Since 1990, Hoberman has taught cinema history at Cooper Union. He has also lectured on film at Harvard and New York University. In addition to his academic and professional career, Hoberman is the author of several important books on cinema, including a collaboration with fellow film critic Jonathan Rosenbaum, entitled Midnight Movies, published in 1983.

In 2006, while reviewing his favorite films of the year, Hoberman wrote, "A curious form of journalism, film reviewing is highly topical yet essentially timeless. It consists of reporting week after week on out-of-body experiences in a parallel universe—subject to its own laws but intermittently visited by millions of others and filled with references to so-called real life." "From a purely subjective point of view, the film event that affected me most deeply would be the two-day screening of Jacques Rivette’s 14-hour Out 1 at the Museum of the Moving Image. But Out 1 had only a single public show—too few to be more than a personal experience."

At the 2008 San Francisco International Film Festival, Hoberman was honored with the prestigious Mel Novikoff Award, an annual award "bestowed on an individual or institution whose work has enhanced the filmgoing public's knowledge and appreciation of world cinema." Hoberman appears in the 2009 documentary film For the Love of Movies: The Story of American Film Criticism, recalling his first movie memory, going with his mother to see Cecil B. DeMille's The Greatest Show On Earth (1952), and how he was mesmerized by a scene in that film that depicts a train crash.

In January 2012, the Village Voice laid off Hoberman in a move to cut costs. Hoberman said, "I have no regrets and whatever sadness I feel is outweighed by a sense of gratitude. Thirty-three years is a long time to be able to do something that you love to do, to champion things you want to champion, and to even get paid for it."

Following his tenure at the Village Voice, Hoberman has contributed articles to other publications, including The Guardian and The New York Review of Books. He also contributes regularly to Film Comment, The New York Times, and The Virginia Quarterly Review.

Hoberman participated in the 2012 Sight & Sound critics' poll, where he listed his ten favorite films as follows: Au hasard Balthazar, Flaming Creatures, The Girl from Chicago, Man with a Movie Camera, Pather Panchali, The Rules of the Game, Rose Hobart, Shoah, Two or Three Things I Know About Her..., and Vertigo.

He is interviewed in the HBO documentary Spielberg to give insight into Steven Spielberg's work.

== Bibliography ==
- Home Made Movies: Twenty Years of American 8mm & Super-8 films. New York: Anthology Film Archives. 1981. ISBN 978-0317559583.
- Hoberman, J.; Rosenbaum, Jonathan (1983). Midnight Movies. Harper & Row. ISBN 978-0060909901.
- Dennis Hopper: From Method to Madness. Minneapolis: Walker Art Center. 1988. ISBN 978-0935640274.
- Vulgar Modernism: Writing on Film and Other Media. Philadelphia: Temple University Press. 1991. ISBN 978-0877228660.
- Bridge of Light: Yiddish Film Between Two Worlds. The Museum of Modern Art, Schocken Books. 1992. ISBN 978-0805241075.
- 42nd Street. BFI Film Classics. London: British Film Institute. 1993. ISBN 978-0851703558.
- The Red Atlantis: Communist Culture in the Absence of Communism. Philadelphia: Temple University Press. 1999. ISBN 978-1566397674.
- On Jack Smith's Flaming Creatures (and Other Secret-flix of Cinemaroc). Granary Books, Hips Road. 2001. ISBN 978-1887123525.
- The Dream Life: Movies, Media, and the Mythology of the Sixties. New York: The New Press. 2003. ISBN 978-1565849785.
- The Magic Hour: Film at Fin de Siècle. Philadelphia: Temple University Press. 2003. ISBN 978-1566399968.
- An Army of Phantoms: American Movies and the Making of the Cold War. New York: The New Press. 2011. ISBN 978-1595580054.
- Film After Film: (Or, What Became of 21st Century Cinema?). New York: Verso Books. 2012. ISBN 978-1781681435.
- Make My Day: Movie Culture in the Age of Reagan. New York: The New Press. 2019. ISBN 978-1595580061.
- Duck Soup. BFI Film Classics. London: British Film Institute. 2021. ISBN 978-1839022258.
- Everything Is Now: Primal Happenings, Underground Movies, Radical Pop, and the 1960s New York Avant-Garde. New York: Verso Books. 2025. ISBN 978-1804290866.
