= The Flower Thief =

- Directed by: Ron Rice
- Written by: Ron Rice
- Produced by: Ron Rice
- Starring: Taylor Mead
- Edited by: Ron Rice
- Release date: 1960
- Running time: 70 minutes
- Country: United States
- Language: English

The Flower Thief is a 1960 underground film directed by Ron Rice.

== Production ==
Shot in 1959 in San Francisco's North Beach neighborhood, the film features non-professional actors like Taylor Mead and Eric "Big Daddy" Nord, and Beat poets living in North Beach such as Bob Kaufman. Skippy Alvarez, who worked at Vesuvio's Bar and lived at The Swiss American Hotel, also appears in the film. She had just returned from attempting to bail Bob Kaufman out of jail. She spoke about how she wished the North Beach police would leave the Beats alone.

The film was produced for less than $1,000 using black-and-white 16 mm 50' film cartridges left over from aerial gunnery equipment used during World War II.

== Release and reception ==
The Flower Thief premiered in 1960 at the Coffee Gallery in San Francisco. It generated little interest, and Mead later had to convince Rice not to destroy the film. Rice screened the film around North Beach several more times and, over objections from Mead, continued to modify The Flower Thief based on audience responses. In April 1962, Cinema 16 presented the film's first New York screening, where the audience was strongly divided. It had a three-week theatrical run, paired with Vernon Zimmerman's To L.A. with Lust, later that year at the Charles Theater. In a review for The New York Times, critic Eugene Archer called it "an original and exciting piece of work."

== See also ==
- List of American films of 1960
