= Ron Rice =

American filmmaker (1935–1964)

- Born: Charles Ronald Rice; 1935; New York City, New York, U.S.
- Died: December 1964 (aged 28–29); Acapulco, Mexico
- Occupation: Filmmaker

Charles Ronald Rice (1935–1964) was an American experimental filmmaker, whose free-form style influenced experimental filmmakers in New York and California during the early 1960s.

== Biography ==
Ron Rice was born in New York City in 1935.

He was 29 when he died of pneumonia in Acapulco, Mexico in December 1964.

== Career ==
=== The Flower Thief ===
Rice twice collaborated with future Warhol star Taylor Mead, including Rice's first and best-known film, The Flower Thief (1960). Created in 1959 for less than $1,000, it used World War II aerial gunnery 16mm film cartridges donated to Rice by Hollywood producer Sam Katzman. In 1962, it was seen by a large New York audience as a selection of Amos Vogel's Cinema 16.

Rice commented on his inventive approach:

In the old Hollywood movie days, studios would keep a man on the set who, when all other sources of ideas failed (writers, directors), was called upon to 'cook up' something for filming. He was called the Wild Man. The Flower Thief has been put together in memory of all the dead wild men who died unnoticed in the field of stunt.

In 2005, after muffled dialogue was restored by the Anthology Film Archives, Ed Halter reviewed the film for the Village Voice:

In Ron Rice's baggy-pantsed beatnik artifact The Flower Thief (1960), Warhol superstar in training Taylor Mead traipses with elfin glee through a lost San Francisco of smoke-stuffed North Beach cafés, oceanside fairgrounds and collapsed post-industrial ruins. Boinging along an improvised picaresque up and down the city's hills, Mead teases playground schoolkids, sniffs wildflowers, gets abducted by cowboys in the park, and has a tea party on a pile of rubble with a potbellied bathing beauty... For consummate subcult critic Parker Tyler, Rice's "dharma-bum films" work by discarding the distinctions between art and life. They "bear resemblance to the lunatic romps of the Marx Brothers, only now the actors are not in comic uniforms, as if the parody were part of real life, not a movie fiction." Today, Mead's Flower Thief uniform—tight hoodie, button-down shirt, three-stripe tennis shoes, and beat-up jeans—can be seen on many an L-train habitué, en route to neo-Bowery facsimiles of post-war cafés, and so the parody has been reversed; such are our own meticulous restorations of the fantasies of other people's youth.

=== Senseless ===
The 28-minute Senseless print was silent, but it played at New York's Charles Theater with Béla Bartók music. This was not planned; it just happened to be one of the few LP records in the projection booth. Each showing was slightly different since the record was never synched with the start of the film at the same place. Cary Collins provided background on the production:

Senseless came out of a film that he planned to make at Eric Nord's island. Rice knew Nord from The Flower Thief, and he knew that Nord purchased an island from the Mexican government with the intent of making that island a Utopia. Unfortunately, Nord forgot to find out if there was water on the island, so when Rice arrived on the island to shoot his film, Nord and his crew realized the mistake they had made and had already cleared off the island. The only thing Ron Rice had left from his trip was some footage that he took on his way to the island to meet Nord. When Rice got back from the trip and arrived in New York, he pooled together his research and the various episodes he had recorded. He devised a potpourri from what he recorded in Mexico and what he had on file and realized that the film would have no plot nor a continuity of a single mediator. Despite the incredible irony, the creation Senseless was completed in 1962. Rice gave credit to Jonas Mekas for the creation of Senseless, but ironically, Senseless is thought of as Rice's most carefully organized formal film.

=== The Queen of Sheba Meets the Atom Man ===
The film describes, poetically, a way of living. The film is a protest which is violent, childish, and sincere—a protest against an industrial world based on the cycle of production and consumption.

— Alberto Moravia, L'espresso

=== Chumlum ===
Rice also worked with underground filmmaker Jack Smith, who appears in Queen of Sheba Meets the Atom Man with Taylor Mead, and in Chumlum. Rice was inspired to make Chumlum while working with Smith on the props for Smith's Normal Love. Chumlum also stars Mario Montez, who appeared in both of Smith's films, as well as several of Andy Warhol's films. Warhol superstar Gerard Malanga also has a role in Chumlum.

Rice's films can still be rented from the Filmmaker's Cooperative. His work paved the way for other experimental filmmakers of the 1960s, including the Kuchar brothers. All but forgotten today, Rice was a major figure of the New American Cinema, and his deeply personal, anarchic films are the work of a true cinematic visionary.

== Awards ==
Rice's Senseless was the winner of the 1962 Filmmaker's Award at New York's showcase of experimental cinema, the Charles Theater. The panel of judges included Variety columnist Herman G. Weinberg and actor Darren McGavin.

Chumlum was selected as one of the 330 films in Anthology Film Archives' Essential Cinema Repertory Collection as chosen by the selection committee of Stan Brakhage, James Broughton, Ken Kelman, Peter Kubelka, Jonas Mekas and P. Adams Sitney.

== Filmography ==
- The Flower Thief (1960)
- The Dancing Master (1961) (Unfinished project with Jerry Jofen)
- Senseless (1962)
- Queen of Sheba Meets the Atom Man (1963)
- Chumlum (1963)
