= Mekas =

Mekas is a surname. Notable people with the surname include:

- Adolfas Mekas (1925–2011), Lithuanian-born American filmmaker, writer, director, and editor
- Jonas Mekas (1922–2019), Lithuanian-born American filmmaker, writer, and curator
