= Semeniškiai =

Semeniškiai may refer to the following places in Lithuania:

- Semeniškiai, Panevėžys
- Semeniškiai, Vilnius
