= Reminiscences of a Journey to Lithuania =

- Directed by: Jonas Mekas
- Produced by: Jonas Mekas
- Starring: Peter Kubelka; Annette Michelson
- Cinematography: Jonas Mekas
- Edited by: Jonas Mekas
- Distributed by: The Film-Makers' Cooperative
- Release date: 1972
- Running time: 88 minutes
- Countries: United Kingdom; West Germany; United States; Lithuania

Reminiscences of a Journey to Lithuania is a 1972 documentary film by Jonas Mekas. It revolves around Mekas' trip back to Semeniškiai, the village of his birth. It was Mekas' second diary film, which narrates through highly personal footage and voiceover the Mekas brothers’ visit to their native Lithuanian village of Semeniškiai, Panevėžys in 1971 after a 27-year absence.

Reminiscences of a Journey to Lithuania is now part of Anthology Film Archives' Essential Cinema Repertory collection. In 2006, the film was selected for preservation in the National Film Registry by the Library of Congress, for its "cultural, aesthetic, or historical significance".
