= Vilnius Guggenheim Hermitage Museum =

Proposed museum in Lithuania

Coordinates: 54.695011°N 25.27113°E

Winning design by Zaha Hadid

Vilnius Guggenheim Hermitage Museum was a proposed art museum in the city of Vilnius, the capital of Lithuania. On 8 April 2008, an international jury named Zaha Hadid, a British-Iraqi architect, the winner of the international design competition for the museum. The Vilnius Guggenheim Initiative was ended after allegations of corruption involving the Jonas Mekas Visual Arts Center.

== Concept ==
As envisioned in 2008, Vilnius Guggenheim Hermitage Museum would have presented exhibitions of new media art, parts of the New York City anthology film archive, and Fluxus art. The Fluxus art movement flourished in New York during the 1960s, and was led by Lithuanian-born artist George Maciunas. Another important part of the exhibition would have been a collection of works by Lithuanian avant-garde film maker Jonas Mekas. These works are currently held by the Jonas Mekas Visual Arts Center. Collections from Saint Petersburg's Hermitage Museum and New York City's Solomon R. Guggenheim Museum would have been displayed as well. Jonas Mekas was a key figure in the New York Fluxus art scene.

It is estimated that the museum would have cost up to 170 million litas (75 million USD). Completion was initially scheduled for 2011. A feasibility study was conducted to explore various aspects of the project's implementation, including market and economic impact analyses. However. due to corruption allegations, the entire project ended.

== Designs ==
Massimiliano Fuksas' design

Design submitted by Daniel Libeskind

Three architects submitted their designs for the final competition: Zaha Hadid, Massimiliano Fuksas, and Daniel Libeskind.

Zaha Hadid, a Pritzker Prize winner, proposed a "mystical object, hovering over spindled artificial landscape strip". She chose to draw a contrast between the building's forms and the vertical forms of nearby skyscrapers. The top of the building reflects surroundings of the Vilnius city. Hadid asserted that "It is especially important today to acknowledge cultural buildings, that they have unique and special morphologies. Those buildings should make an impression on people, people should accept them."

The dominant features of Massimiliano Fuksas' project are crossed domes, which leave an impression of movement. According to Fuksas, huge "eyes" looking into the sky would point and filter daylight into the building. Fuksas asserted that such design principles would allow "visitors to clearly distinguish the exposition halls from other spaces - restaurants and shops - and provide comfortable access to the river." The centre of the building would be reserved for permanent Mekas and Mačiūnas collections.

Daniel Libeskind, winner of the competition to rebuild the World Trade Center, presented his work under the name "Nexus". According to Libeskind, his concept links the history of Vilnius to its present via a Connection. He stated that "This connection is revealed through the structure, which with its wide and slashing arcades covers history and innovation, old panoramas and new skyscrapers, the city and the Neris river". Libeskind also asserted the need to connect nature and architecture: "Tightness between landscape, which turns to building, and building, which converts to landscape, ravels unheard possibility to create a sculptural form, which opens to visitor".

The director of the Hermitage Museum Mikhail Piotrovsky, the director of the Solomon R. Guggenheim Foundation, Thomas Krens, the director of Frankfurt's Museum of Architecture, Peter Schmal, and the vice-chairman of the Lithuanian Architects Union, Gintaras Čaikauskas, were members of the jury that evaluated the designs. Lithuanian PM Gediminas Kirkilas and former Vilnius Mayor Juozas Imbrasas also participated in the decision-making process.

== Controversy and termination of initiative ==
The museum was initially scheduled to open in 2011. Later, it was announced that the museum was scheduled to open in 2013. However, the project was postponed due to alleged illegal channelling of funds to the Jonas Mekas Visual Arts Center and had been under investigation since 2010. The museum project, as of March 2012, was reported as having regained support, including that of Vilnius mayor Artūras Zuokas, even though the embezzlement inquiry was still ongoing.

The Vilnius Guggenheim Initiative was ended after allegations of corruption involving the Jonas Mekas Visual Arts Center, discovered after an audit by the National Audit Office of Lithuania. Finland then received the opportunity to develop the museum in the Guggenheim Helsinki Plan, with no further chances to develop the museum in Vilnius.

== See also ==
- List of Guggenheim Museums
