= Peter Beard =

American photographer and writer (1938–2020)

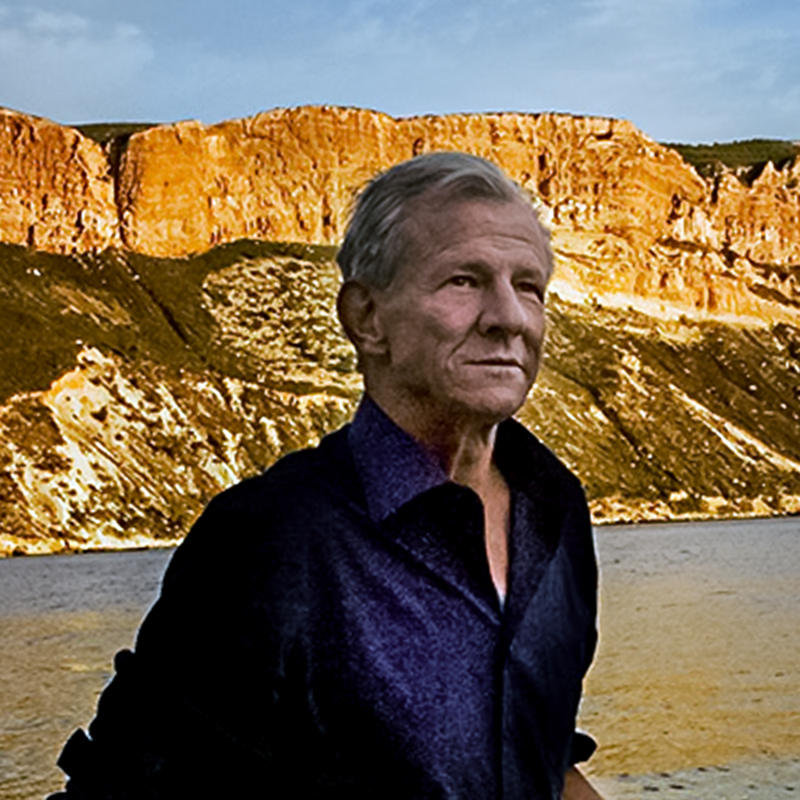
- Beard in 2007
- Born: Peter Hill Beard; January 22, 1938; New York City, United States
- Disappeared: March 31, 2020; Montauk, New York, U.S.
- Died: c. March 31/April 19, 2020 (aged 82); Montauk Point, New York, U.S.
- Body discovered: Camp Hero State Park
- Education: Pomfret School; Yale University (BA)
- Occupation: Artist
- Spouses: Minnie Cushing Beard Coleman (m. 1967; div. 1970) Cheryl Tiegs (m. 1981; div. 1983) Nejma Khanum (m. 1986)
- Children: 1
- Website: www.peterbeard.com

Peter Hill Beard (January 22, 1938 – March 31 / April 19, 2020) was an American artist, photographer, diarist, and writer. He lived and worked in New York City, Montauk, Long Island and Kenya. His photographs of Africa, African animals and the journals that often integrated his photographs, have been widely shown and published since the 1960s.

== Early life and education ==
Peter Hill Beard was born on January 22, 1938, in New York. Descended from distinguished American families on both sides, Beard was one of three sons born to Roseanne (Hoare) Beard and Anson McCook Beard Jr. His middle name commemorates his grandmother Ruth Hill, and her father, Canadian-American railway builder James Jerome Hill, who founded the Great Northern Railway in the United States in the late 19th century, and used his railroad fortune to become a great patron of the arts.

Beard was raised in New York City, Alabama, and Islip, Long Island. He began keeping diaries as a young boy and making photographs, as an extension of the diaries, at the age of 12.

During Pomfret School, at seventeen, he went on a life-changing trip to Africa with Quentin Keynes, the explorer and great-grandson of Charles Darwin, working on a film documenting rare wildlife, including the white and black rhinos of Zululand.

Peter followed grandfather Anson Sr. to Yale University in 1957, with the intention of pursuing pre-med studies, only to switch his major to art history. At Yale, he was tapped into the secret society Scroll and Key. His mentors at Yale included Josef Albers, Richard Lindner and Vincent Scully. Beard graduated with a BA in 1961.

== Art ==
Beard returned to Kenya upon graduation. Working at Tsavo National Park, he photographed and documented the demise of 35,000 elephants and other wildlife, later to become the subject of his first book, The End of the Game. During this time, Beard acquired Hog Ranch, a property near the Ngong Hills adjacent to the coffee farm owned by Karen Blixen, which would become his lifelong home-base in East Africa.

Beard's photographs of Africa, African animals and journals that often integrate his photographs have been widely shown and published since the 1970s. Each of his works is unique, a combination of his photography with elements derived from his daily diary-keeping, a practice he continued until his death in 2020. These volumes contain newspaper clippings, dried leaves, insects, old sepia-toned photos, transcribed telephone messages, marginalia in India ink, photographs of women, quotes, found objects, and the like; these become incorporated, with original drawings and collage by Beard. Certain of his works incorporate animal blood, sometimes Beard's own blood (in sparing quantities), a painting medium the artist favored.

The Peter Beard Studio and Archive was started by Peter and Nejma Beard, and is the primary source for artwork by Peter Beard. The Archive maintains a repository of published and unpublished written and visual material relating to the artist's life, work, projects, travels, exhibitions, and relations with his cohort.

Beard's first exhibition was at the Blum Helman Gallery, New York City, in 1975. Landmark museum exhibitions have been held at the International Center of Photography, New York City, in 1977, and the Centre national de la photographie, Paris, in 1997. Gallery exhibitions followed in Berlin, London, Toronto, Madrid, Milan, Tokyo and Vienna. Beard's work is included in private collections throughout the world.

== Personal life ==
Beard married his first wife, Mary "Minnie" Olivia Cochran Cushing in 1967; their marriage lasted only briefly. In the 1970s, he dated socialites Lee Radziwill and Barbara Allen.

Beard married his second wife, model Cheryl Tiegs, in 1981. They divorced in 1983.

In 1986, he married Nejma Khanum. The couple had a daughter, Zara (born 1988), for whom his book, Zara's Tales, was written.

In 1996, he was badly injured by an elephant but survived.

Beard befriended and in some cases collaborated with many artists, including Andy Warhol, Andrew Wyeth, Francis Bacon, Karen Blixen, Truman Capote, Richard Lindner, and Salvador Dalí. He also photographed many other well-known people. He appeared in Adolfas Mekas's film, Hallulujah the Hills, in 1963, at the first New York Film Festival.

== Death ==
On the afternoon of March 31, 2020, Beard, who was suffering from dementia and ill health after a stroke, wandered away from his Montauk, New York home. On April 19, Beard's body was found by a hunter in a densely wooded area in Camp Hero State Park in Montauk Point, New York.

== Publications ==
=== Selected books ===
- Graham, Alistair, and Beard, Peter (1973). Eyelids of Morning: The Mingled Destinies of Crocodiles and Men. Greenwich, CT: New York Graphic Society. ISBN 0-8212-0464-5
- Beard, Peter; and Gatura, Kamante (1975). Longing for Darkness: Kamante's Tales from Out of Africa. New York: Harcourt Brace Jovanovich. ISBN 0-15-153080-7
- Beard, Peter (2004). Zara's Tales: Perilous Escapades in Equatorial Africa. New York: Knopf. ISBN 0-679-42659-0
- Beard, Peter (1965). The End of the Game. New York: Viking Press. Reprinted New York: Doubleday, 1977. Japan: Camera Manichi, 1978. Germany: Taschen, 2008. ISBN 978-3-8365-0530-7
- Beard, Peter; Beard, Nejma; Edwards, Owen; Aronson, Steven M.L. (2008). Peter Beard (Collector's Edition). Germany: Taschen, 2006. (Art Edition) Germany: Taschen, 2007. (Trade Edition) Germany: Taschen, 2008, 2013, and 2020. ISBN 978-3-8365-7742-7
- Beard, Peter; Paul Theroux. 50th Anniversary Edition of The End of the Game. Taschen. ISBN -978-3-8365-5547-0

=== Catalogues ===
- Bacon, Francis; Beard, Peter (2021). Wild Life: Francis Bacon and Peter Beard. London: Ordovas Books. ISBN 978-1-9996681-7-4.
- Beard, Peter (1993). Diary: From a Dead Man's Wallet: Confessions of a Bookmaker. Japan: Libroport Publishing Co., Ltd. ISBN 978-4-8457-0791-1
- Beard, Peter, and Caujolle, Christian (1996). Peter Beard: Photo Poche #67. Paris: Centre national de la photographie, ISBN 2867541034
- Beard, Peter (1997). Oltre la fine del Mondo. Milan: Grafiche Milani.
- Beard, Peter (1998). Beyond the End of the World. Milan: Universe Publishing (a division of Rizzoli International Publications, Inc.). ISBN 978-0-7893-0147-5
- Beard, Peter (1999). Peter Beard: Stress & Density. Vienna: KunstHausWien, Museums Betriebs Gesellschaft, mbH. ISBN 978-3901247071
- Beard, Peter (1999). Peter Beard: Fifty Years of Portraits. Santa Fe, NM: Arena Editions. ISBN 1-892041-15-4

== Filmography ==
Year	Film	Featured	Director	Producer	Editor	Other
2017	That Summer	Yes	No	Yes	No	No
2013	Peter Beard: A Wild Life	Yes	No	No	No	No
2009	The Making of the 2009 Pirelli Calendar	Yes	No	No	No	No
1998	Peter Beard, Scrapbooks from Africa & beyond		Guillaume Bonn and Jean-Claude Luyat	Canal +		
1994	Montauk Diaries	Yes	No	No	No	No
1988	Last Word from Paradise: With Peter Beard in Africa	Yes	No	No	No	No
1984	Last Word from Paradise	Yes	No	Yes	No	No
1980	Japanese Long Line Tuna Fishing	No	No	No	No	Introducer
1979	Africa: The End of the Game	Yes	No	No	No	No
1976	The Bicentennial Big Foot Blues	No	Yes	Yes	No	No
1975-76	Longing for Darkness	No	No	Yes	Yes	No
1972	Sisters (working title)	Yes	Yes	Yes	No	Initiated
1963	Hallelujah the Hills	Yes	No	No	No	No

== See also ==
- Sandpiper Hill House Windmill
