= Marty Greenbaum =

American painter (1934–2020)

- Born: March 3, 1934; Coney Island, New York
- Died: January 24, 2020 (aged 85)
- Website: martygreenbaum.com

Marty Greenbaum (1934 in New York City – 2020) was an American painter, mixed media assemblage and book artist.

== Life ==
Marty Greenbaum grew up in Coney Island, Brooklyn. In 1952 he attended the University of Arizona with a basketball scholarship and graduated with a Bachelor's degree in 1956. He received his Master's degree in art studies in 1991 from Brooklyn College.

Greenbaum is best known for his mixed media assemblages, paintings, and artist books. Art critic Walter Robinson described Greenbaum’s work as "zanily beautiful art brut paintings” and assemblages resembling "the ritual artifacts of some lost psychedelic tribe.”

Greenbaum appeared in three films: Hallelujah the Hills in 1963 by Adolfas Mekas, Life Dances On, in 1980 by Robert Frank, and The Present in 1996 by Robert Frank. Between 1962 and 1965 he took part in happenings by Allan Kaprow and experimental dance by Yvonne Rainer. Greenbaum authored his own happenings, i.e. Coney Island Carny, including artists such as Eddie Barton, Remy Charlip, Paul Kaplow, Paul Krasner, Al Hanson, Ed Blair, Allen Ginsberg, John Hamond, Eddie Rabkin, Lou Gosset, Renee Renee, Allan Kaprow, Phyllis Yampolsky, Thomas Hoving, Jackie Ferrara, Peter Schumann, Jim Bell, Bill Marshall, Corla Lopez, Bruce Waite, and Mark di Suvero, as well as organizing the Hall of Issues with Phyllis Yampolsky at The Judson Memorial Church.

Greenbaum had several teaching positions in the New York City public school system and was a member of the Creative Artists Public Service program twice, he also participated in various exhibitions with book objects. His work is in several public collections including The Art Institute of Chicago, Artists' Books, The Brooklyn Museum Collection, The Chrysler Museum, Norfolk, VA, Citibank, NYC, Colgate University, Hamilton, NY, Jacksonville Art Museum, Jacksonville, FL, Madison Art Center, Madison, WI, SUNY at New Paltz, NY and more.

== Books as Objects ==
"Greenbaum, an early conceptualist, burned books in the 1960s, exhibiting the remains as 'corpses.' Today, he makes fetishistic notebooks filled with colored paper and scribbled equations, accretions of feathers and Rhoplex."

"Marty Greenbaum and Barton Benes destroy texts to create sculpture: Benes 'Bound Book,' a literal rope and wax imprisonment, and Greenbaum's 'Cutting Up,' a mixed media paste over of muted colors." Some of his most notable artist books include: "Batman" 1963-67, "In '84 Returned in 2004" In Marty's words, "Many techniques and strategies have been used in my mixed media books. By the time of 'In '84 Returned in 2004' I was cutting out shapes and opening up areas in the pages of a finished or an empty book. This device mirrored my sense of movement through space and time, the turning of the pages like a walk through the city, became an exploration of a multidirectional experience, ricocheting back and forth -- the going out and the coming back, the going forward and the return."

== Solo exhibitions (selection) ==
- 2007 Two Artists, Windsor Whip Works, Windsor NY
- 2001 Pacifico Fine Art, NYC
- 1972, 1979, 1985 Allan Stone Gallery, NYC
- 1977 Picker Art Gallery, Colgate University, Hamilton NY
- 1963, 1964, 1965 Stryke Gallery, NYC; In a review of the show, David Bourdon writes: "Marty Greenbaum's work is genuinely messy, crude and seemingly generated by a kind of infantile depravity. The show has the look of a sleazy midway at Coney Island ... It comes on as pathetic, trivial, and awful, and succeeds at being thoroughly enchanting."

== Group and Traveling exhibitions (selection) ==
- 2019 One Plus One Equals Three, curated by Roger Winter, Kirk Hopper Fine Art, Dallas, TX
- 2017 Sorcery & Craft, Allan Stone Projects, New York, NY
- 2008 8 Artists 8 Books, 5 + 5 Gallery, Brooklyn, NY
- 1999 1999 Talent, Allan Stone Gallery, New York, NY
- 1998 Artist Books, Bound & Unbound Gallery, New York, NY
- 1992 Fetishism, Allan Stone Gallery, New York, NY
- Salon of the Book, Caroline Corre, Paris, France; Artists; Books, Centre Georges Pompidou, Paris, France
- 1979 "Book Makers: Center for Book Arts First Five Years", Arthur A. Houghton, Jr. Gallery, The Cooper Union, New York, NY
- 1978 The Detective Show MoMA, PS1, Queens, NY
- 1978 Artists' Books U.S.A., traveling exhibition curated by Peter Frank and Martha Wilson
- 1977 Metamorphosis of the Book, documenta 6, Kassel, Germany; Book Objects, Albright-Knox Gallery, Buffalo, NY
- 1976 Forty Years of American Collage, Buecker & Harpsichords, New York, NY; The Book as Art, Fendrich Gallery, Washington, D.C.; The Object as Poet, National Collection of Fine Arts, Washington, D.C.
- 1975 Artists Make Toys, The Clocktower, New York, NY
- 1970 Fur & Feathers, Museum of Contemporary Crafts, New York, NY; Personal Torment/ Human Concern, Whitney Museum of American Art, New York, NY
- 1968 "Destruction Art," Finch College Museum of Art, New York, NY
- 1965 "Objects, by Dorothea Baer, Jackie Ferrara, Marty Greenbaum, Lulu, Carolee Schneemann, Van Bovenkamp Gallery, New York, NY
- 1961 Hall of Issues, Judson Memorial Church, New York, NY

== Awards (selection) ==
- 1983 The Institute for Arts & Urban Resources, NYC
- 1976 MacDowell Fellowship
- 1975 CAPS Creative Artists Public Service, New York State
- 1974 National Endowment for the Arts
- 1972 CAPS Creative Artists Public Service, New York State; Boskop Foundation, NYC
- 1968 Lannan Foundation, Chicago, IL
