= Bakaitis =

- Lithuanian surname
- m.: Bakaitis
- f.: (unmarried): Bakaitytė
- f.: (married): Bakaitienė

Bakaitis is a Lithuanian surname. Notable people with the surname include:

- Helmut Bakaitis (born 1944), Australian actor and screenwriter
- Vyt Bakaitis (born 1940), Lithuanian-born American translator, editor, and poet
