= Hallelujah the Hills (film) =

- Directed by: Adolfas Mekas
- Written by: Adolfas Mekas
- Produced by: David C. Stone
- Starring: Peter H. Beard; Martin Greenbaum; Sheila Finn; Peggy Steffans; Jerome Raphel; Blanche Dee; Jerome Hill; Taylor Mead; Emsh
- Cinematography: Ed Emshwiller
- Edited by: Adolfas Mekas
- Music by: Meyer Kupferman
- Production company: Vermont Productions
- Release date: 1963
- Running time: 82 minutes
- Country: United States
- Language: English

Hallelujah the Hills is a 1963 American comedy film written, directed and edited by Adolfas Mekas. The picture was his first feature film.

In 1963, after screenings in the Cannes Festival Critics’ section, the Montreal International Film Festival, and the Locarno Festival, where it won the Silver Sail, Hallelujah the Hills made its US debut at the First New York Film Festival at Lincoln Center on September 14, 1963. It received rave reviews and went on to a 15-week engagement at the 5th Avenue Cinema in New York, and movie theaters around the country. It is available in 16mm and 35mm from Anthology Film Archives and the Museum of Modern Art.

== Plot ==
Jack and Leo have visited a small town in Vermont for seven consecutive years for outdoor sports and to court the same woman Vera. Upon their return for an eighth year, both are shocked at the news that she has married another man. They attempt to forget about her by getting drunk but end up reminiscing about all the whimsical memories they had with her. Two different actresses play Vera in flashbacks depending on whether its Jack or Leo telling the story.

== Cast ==
- Peter H. Beard as Jack
- Sheila Finn as Jack's Vera
- Marty Greenbaum as Leo
- Peggy Steffans as Leo's Vera
- Jerome Raphel as Father
- Blanche Dee as Mother
- Jerome Hill as Convict I
- Taylor Mead as Convict II

== Publicity ==
At its debut at the New York Film Festival, Mekas introduced his inspiration for the film, a woman who posed in a bikini. He also parodied Academy Awards ceremonies by formally thanking such "contributors" as Thomas Edison, Sergei Eisenstein and D. W. Griffith.

A pair of black and white photographs pertaining to the movie appeared in the 20 December 1963 year-end double issue of LIFE. One had Mekas and his older brother Jonas who was the picture's assistant director, the other a scene from the film with Beard stuck in an awkward position amongst bare tree branches. Finn, who stars as Jack's Vera, was featured on the cover of the 17 March 1961 issue of the same publication two years earlier.

== See also ==
- List of American films of 1963
