= Guillaume Bonn =

French-African documentary photographer

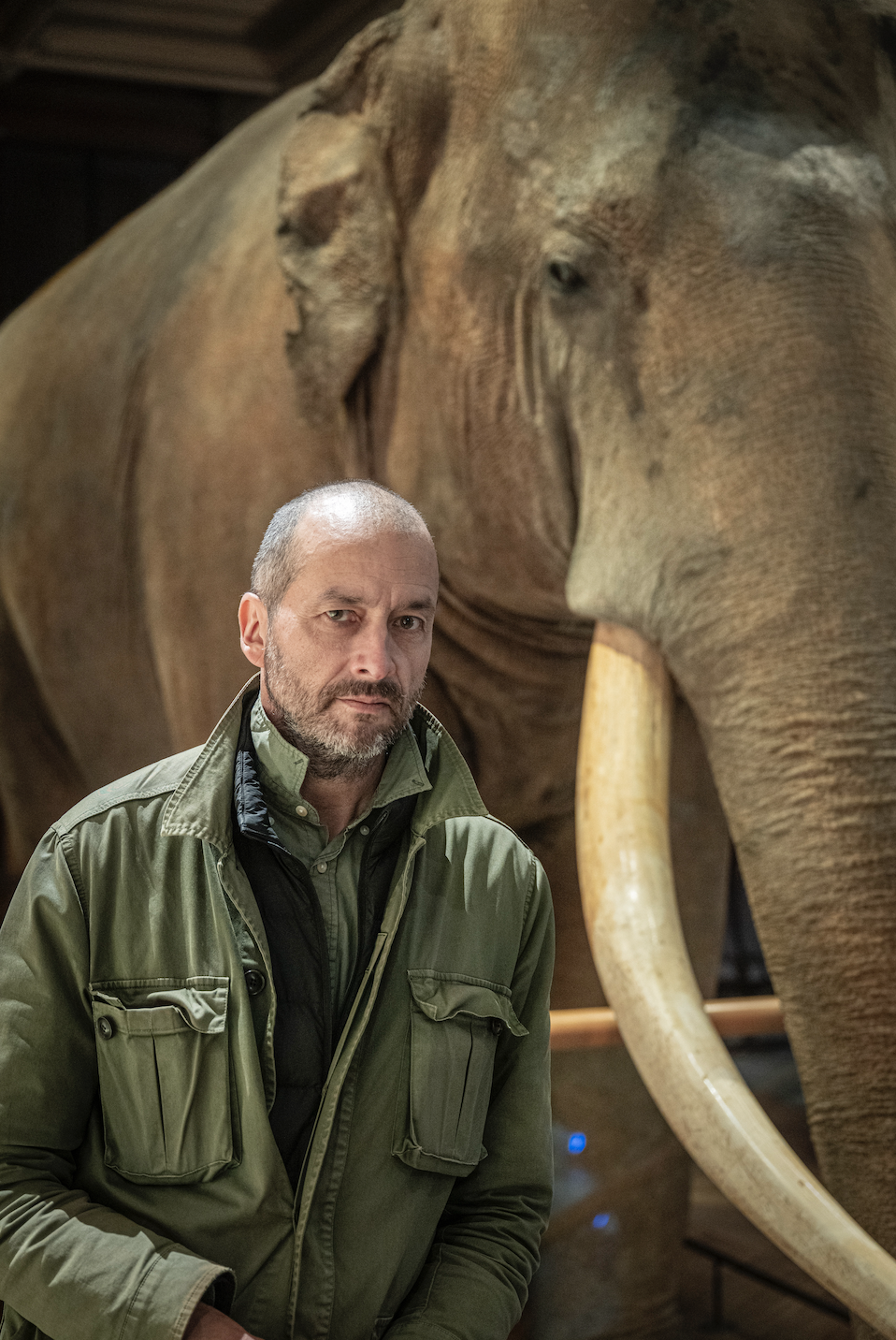
Guillaume Bonn

Guillaume Bonn (born October 6, 1970) is a documentary photographer, author, and filmmaker of French and Malagasy descent.

Bonn's work has focused on conflicts, social issues, and environmental challenges, particularly across Africa. Bonn began his career in the 1990s documenting the conflict in Mogadishu, Somalia. His work has appeared in The New York Times, The Economist, Newsweek, Vogue and Le Monde amongst others. For 15 years, he was a contributor to Vanity Fair. Bonn has also authored several books including the recently released Paradise Inc. and co-directed a documentary about his friend Peter Beard. He is a fellow of the Royal Geographical Society.

== Early life ==
Bonn was born in 1970 in Antananarivo, Madagascar. His French great-grandfather was a military officer and a colonial administrator and his great-grandmother a Malagasy woman. Bonn was raised in Madagascar, the Comoros Islands, North Yemen, Djibouti, and Kenya.

He studied economics at the University of Montreal and international politics at University of Quebec at Montreal (UQAM) before enrolling in a full-time documentary photography program at the International Center of Photography (ICP) in New York City.

== Career ==
Bonn began his career as a photographer at the age of 20, documenting the conflict in Mogadishu, Somalia, shortly after the collapse of the Barre government. In May 1993, he returned to Somalia to work alongside his childhood friend, Dan Eldon, who was covering the Restore Hope operation for Reuters. Eldon was killed in Mogadishu on July 12, 1993, while reporting on what would later become known as the "Bloody Monday" raid, conducted by the U.S. military.

Bonn, alongside journalist Marc Lacey, has reported on the Darfur conflict in Sudan, allegations of child sexual abuse by United Nations peacekeepers in the Democratic Republic of the Congo.

Bonn's work has appeared in The New York Times, Newsweek, Le Monde, the Guardian the Observer and other newspapers and magazines. From 2002 to 2017, Bonn was a contributor to Vanity Fair for 15 years during Graydon Carter's tenure as editor-in-chief.

Bonn has received two grants from the Pulitzer Center for two photography projects on Kenya. His grant work, "Kenya: The Landscape of Turkana County" featured in Newsweek in 2014 in collaboration with Jessica Hatcher. Bonn has won numerous prizes for his photography. He has also been nominated three times for the Prix Pictet (Pictet Prize) in 2012, 2014, and 2015. He was also a finalist for the Lucie Photo Book Prize in 2024.

Bonn has also authored several books, including Mosquito Coast: Travels from Maputo to Mogadishu. His most recent book, Paradise Inc, featuring an introduction by Jon Lee Anderson, was first published in 2024. Bonn co-directed, with Jean-Claude Luyat, a Canal+ documentary about his friend Peter Beard, entitled Peter Beard: Scrapbooks from Africa & Beyond. Bonn would later recall his friendship with Beard in The Gentleman's Journal.

Bonn is also fellow of the Royal Geographical Society.

== Critical reception ==
Alessia Glaviano reviewed Paradise Inc. for Vogue, writing "In a world saturated with images—where beauty is too often divorced from meaning and atrocity reduced to content—Paradise Inc. by Guillaume Bonn offers something far rarer: a work of moral clarity, radical honesty, and necessary discomfort. At once elegy and indictment, memoir and investigation, it is a searing visual and textual reckoning with colonial legacies, environmental collapse, and the politics of representation.”

Writing about his book, Mosquito Coast, Eleanor Brugioni wrote "the title... most evidently represents is a clear analogy between Bonn's photographic and visual work and the literary genre of travel literature, where the African continent indisputably stands out as a geographical and aesthetic literary paradigm."

Jon Lee Anderson writes in The New Yorker: "Like an archeologist, Bonn has the urge to seek out and preserve whatever amounts to a legacy of the past in East Africa. The difference is that he takes pictures, and that the past he seeks to record is quite a recent one."

== Publications ==
=== Books (Monographs) ===
- Paradise Inc, Hemeria 1st Ed. (French) 2024; Revised edition (English) 2025 ISBN 978-2-490952-53-3.
- Bonn, Guillaume (2017). Addis Abeba (1st ed.). Be-Poles. ISBN 978-2-917004-35-7.
- Bonn, Guillaume (2016). Mosquito coast, travels from Maputo to Mogadishu (1st ed.). Germany: Hatje Cantz. ISBN 978-3-7757-3968-9
- Bonn, Guillaume (2007). Le Mal d'Afrique (1st ed.). Empire. ISBN 978-0-9779008-3-1.
- Bonn, Guillaume (2006). Peter beard, Scrapbooks from Africa and beyond (1st ed.). USA: Empire. ISBN 0-9779008-4-3.

=== Contributions ===
Bonn's photography has been featured in a number of books, including:

- Eshun, Ekow (2020). Africa State of Mind: Contemporary Photography Reimagines a Continent. Thames and Hudson. ISBN 978-0-500-54516-4.
- Eshun, Ekow (2020). Africa 21e siècle: Photographie contemporaine africaine (1st ed.). Textuel. ISBN 978-2-84597-806-5.
- Eshun, Ekow (2020). L'Africa del XXI secolo. Fotografie da un continente. Einaudi. ISBN 978-88-06-24555-9.
- Little, Myles (2016). 1%: Privilege in a Time of Global Inequality (1st ed.). Hatje Cantz. ISBN 978-3-7757-4094-4.
- Munk, Nina (2013) The Idealist: Jeffrey Sachs and the Quest to End Poverty. Doubleday. ISBN 978-0-385-52581-7
- Nairobi 24, Kwani, 2008

== Awards ==
Bonn has won a number of awards including:

- PDN Photo Annual, USA, 2007
- POPCAP12 African Contemporary Photography, 2012
- American Photography Winner (35), 2018

He has also been the recipient of two grants from the Pulitzer Center.
