= As I Was Moving Ahead Occasionally I Saw Brief Glimpses of Beauty =

2000 documentary by Jonas Mekas

- Directed by: Jonas Mekas
- Written by: Jonas Mekas
- Produced by: Jonas Mekas
- Cinematography: Jonas Mekas
- Edited by: Jonas Mekas
- Music by: Auguste Varkalis
- Distributed by: Canyon Cinema
- Release date: November 4, 2000 (London Film Festival)
- Running time: 288 minutes
- Country: United States
- Language: English

As I Was Moving Ahead Occasionally I Saw Brief Glimpses of Beauty is a 2000 experimental documentary film directed by Jonas Mekas. The film had its world premiere on November 4, 2000, at the BFI London Film Festival and is a compilation of Mekas' home movies. In 2022, the decennial poll by Sight and Sound magazine named it one of the 250 greatest movies ever made.

== Synopsis ==
Compiled from Mekas' home movies, the film is an attempt by the director to re-construct his life through various home movies filmed over a period of about 30 years, divided into 12 "chapters". Events shown in the film are things such as weddings, gatherings, birthdays and picnics, as well as more landmark personal events such as the first steps of his children. Throughout the film, Mekas offers his own commentary and insight on what the viewer is seeing.

== Reception ==
The New York Times commented that the film was "a first — the home movie as epic" and stated that "Mr. Mekas provides more of an immersion into his personal life than he has allowed anyone to view before in the welter of films he has built up over his career." The Village Voice called the movie an "unabashedly happy film" and noted that "Mekas plays this up with several wry comments, once calling his work 'a film about people who never argue or have fights and love each other.'"
