= Panevėžio apygardos balsas =

Lithuanian weekly newspaper

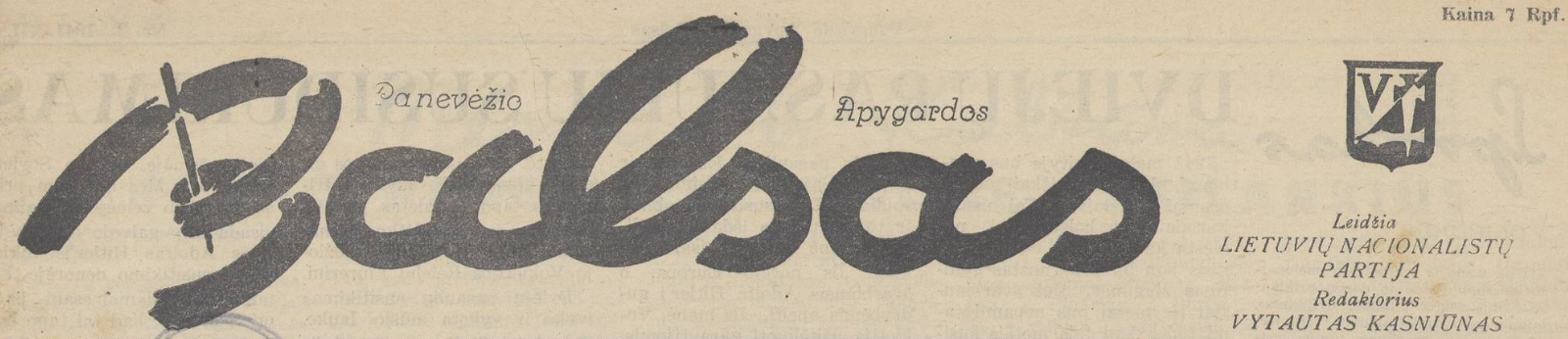
- Type: Weekly newspaper
- Founded: August 1941
- Ceased publication: May–June 1944
- Language: Lithuanian
- City: Panevėžys
- Country: Lithuania

The Panevėžio apygardos balsas (literally: Voice of Panevėžys county) was the weekly newspaper of the Lithuanian Nationalist Party in Panevėžys, which ran since August 1941 until May or June 1944. It was also the newspaper of Panevėžys county.

== History ==
Panevėžio apygardos balsas replaced the weekly Panevėžietis ("Panevėžian") on 29 November 1941. Panevėžietis began to be published in June or 7 July 1941 but was initially called the Išlaisvintas panevėžietis ("Liberated Panevėžian") until its 9th issue in mid-September. Its editor-in-chief was Petras Balčiūnas.

== Editors ==
- Vytautas Kasniūnas and Algirdas Jonas Kaulėnas – 1941–1942
- Jonas Vytautas Narbutas and Jonas Mekas – 1943–1944. At this point in time, this was an underground newspaper.

== Sources ==
- Tapinas, Laimonas (1997). "Panevėžio apygardos balsas" (PDF). Žurnalistikos enciklopedija (in Lithuanian). Vilnius: Pradai. ISBN 9986-776-62-7.
- Bruzgul, Danuta (2008). "LCVA fondo R-1267 pažyma". www.archyvai.lt (in Lithuanian).
