= Walden (1968 film) =

- Directed by: Jonas Mekas
- Produced by: Jonas Mekas
- Narrated by: Jonas Mekas
- Cinematography: Jonas Mekas
- Edited by: Jonas Mekas
- Distributed by: The Film-Makers' Cooperative
- Release date: March 1968
- Running time: 177 minutes
- Country: United States
- Language: English

Walden, originally titled Diaries, Notes and Sketches (also known as Walden), is a 1968 American film by experimental filmmaker Jonas Mekas. After several years of filming everyday scenes from his life, Mekas was commissioned by the Albright–Knox Art Gallery to make Walden. It was his first major diary film, and he named it after Henry David Thoreau's 1854 memoir Walden. Mekas's film has received acclaim as a work of avant-garde cinema.

== Description ==
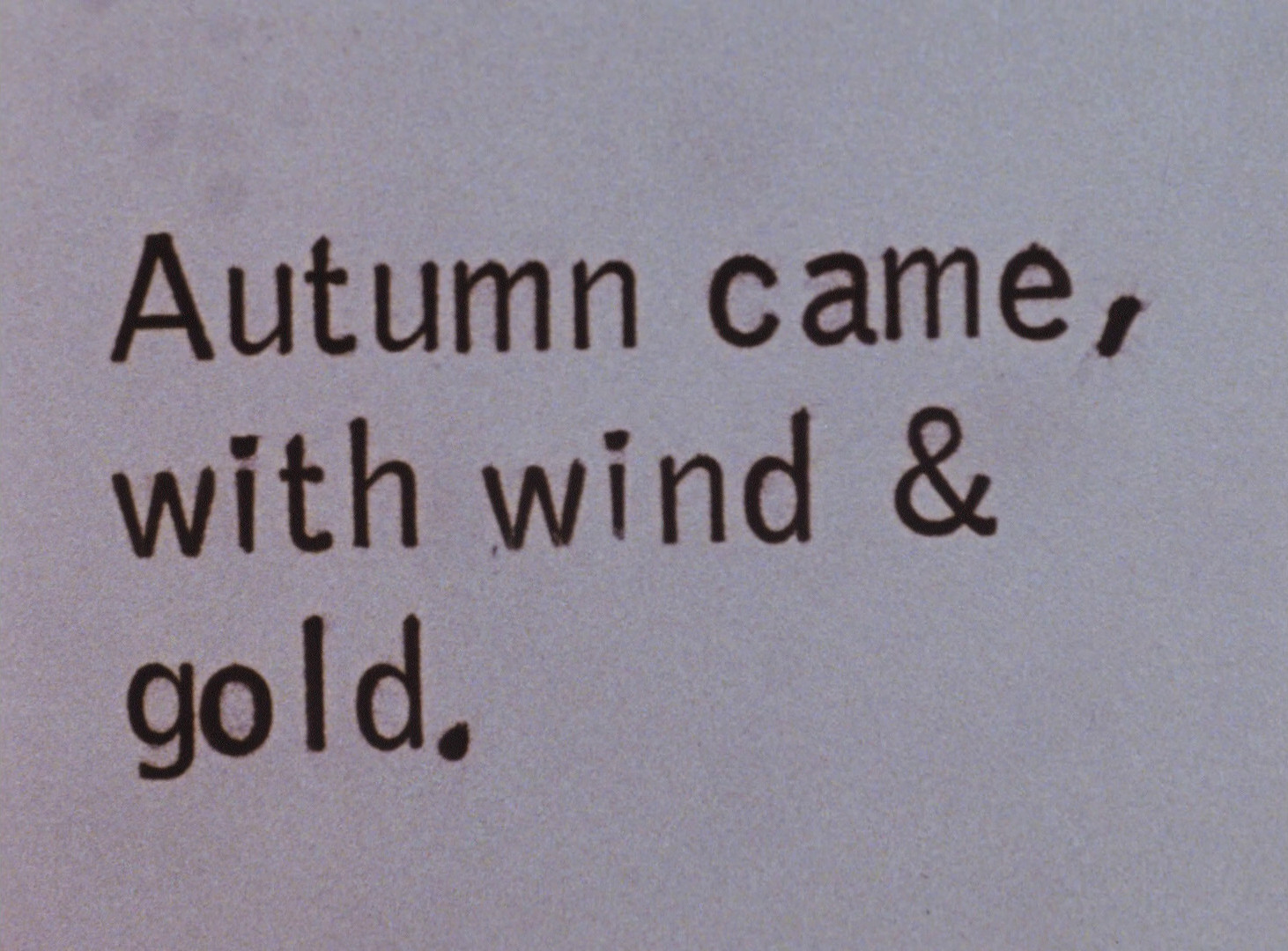
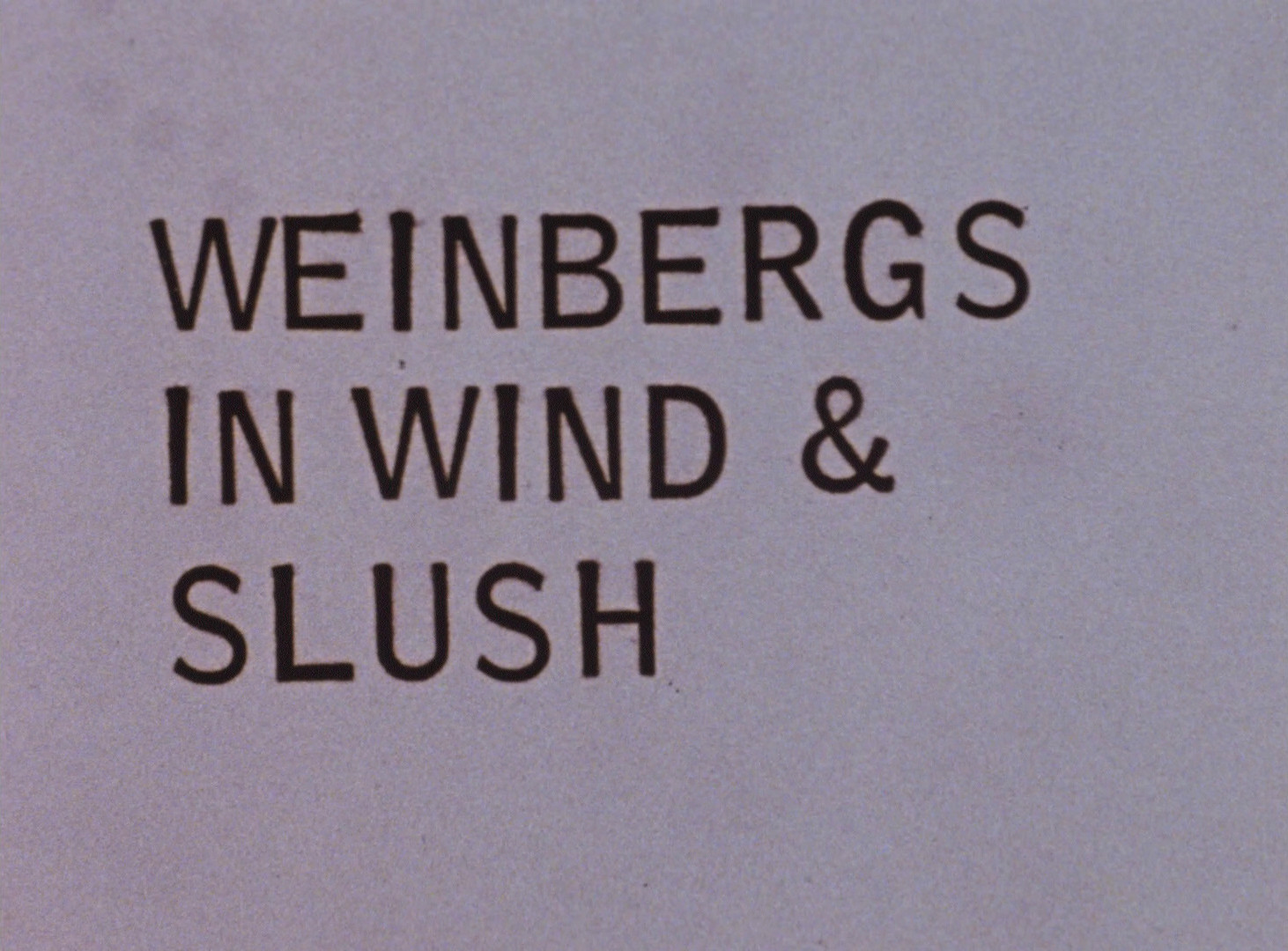
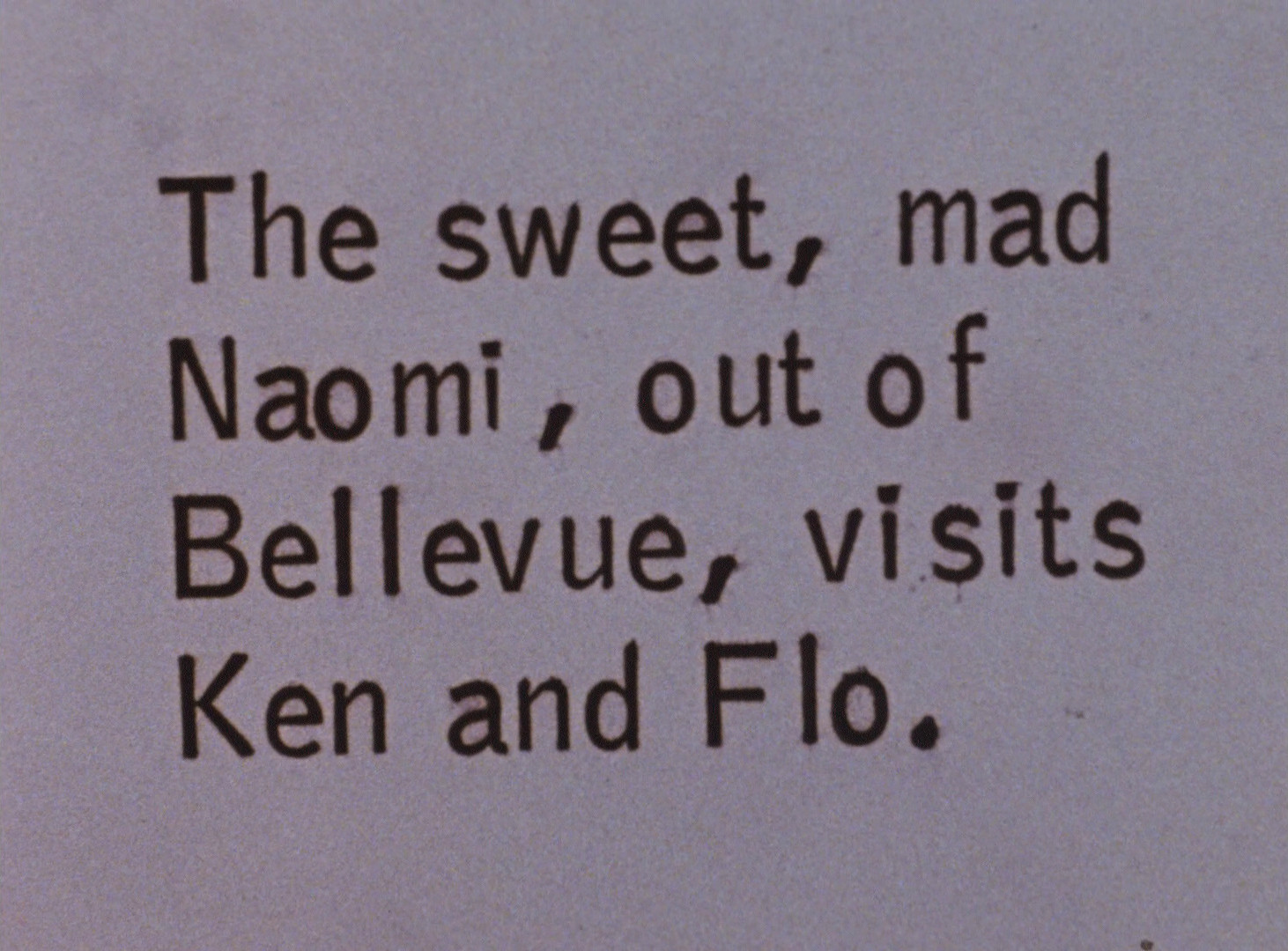
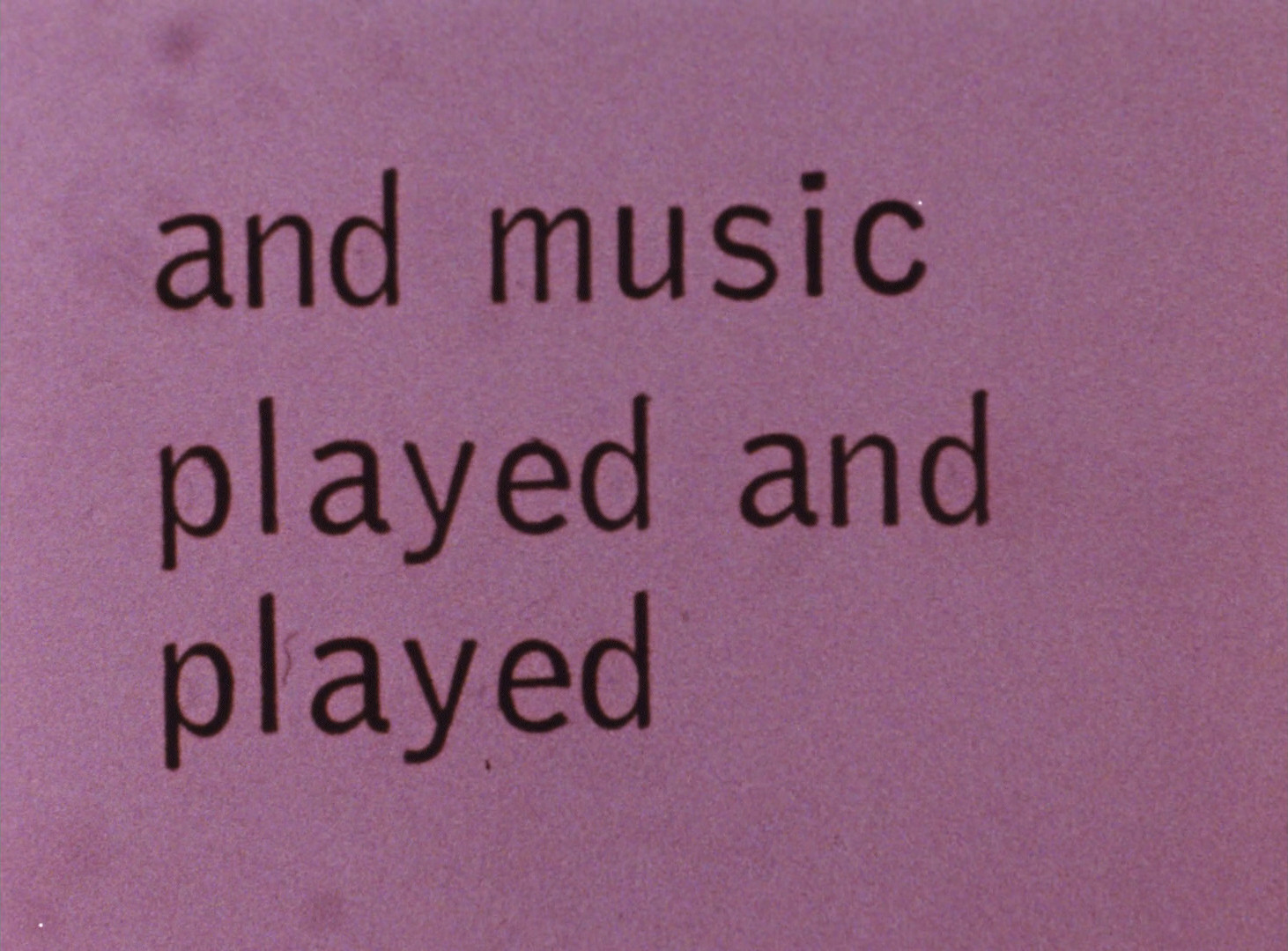
The film includes typed intertitles with poetic descriptions of adjacent scenes.

Walden is divided into four sections. It shows a chronicle of events in Mekas's life, with intertitles describing the images that precede or follow them. The soundtrack alternates between music, narration by Mekas, and environmental sounds.

The scenes show social visits with friends as well as various social events, such as weddings. Many famous figures of the American avant-garde make appearances in the film.

== Production ==
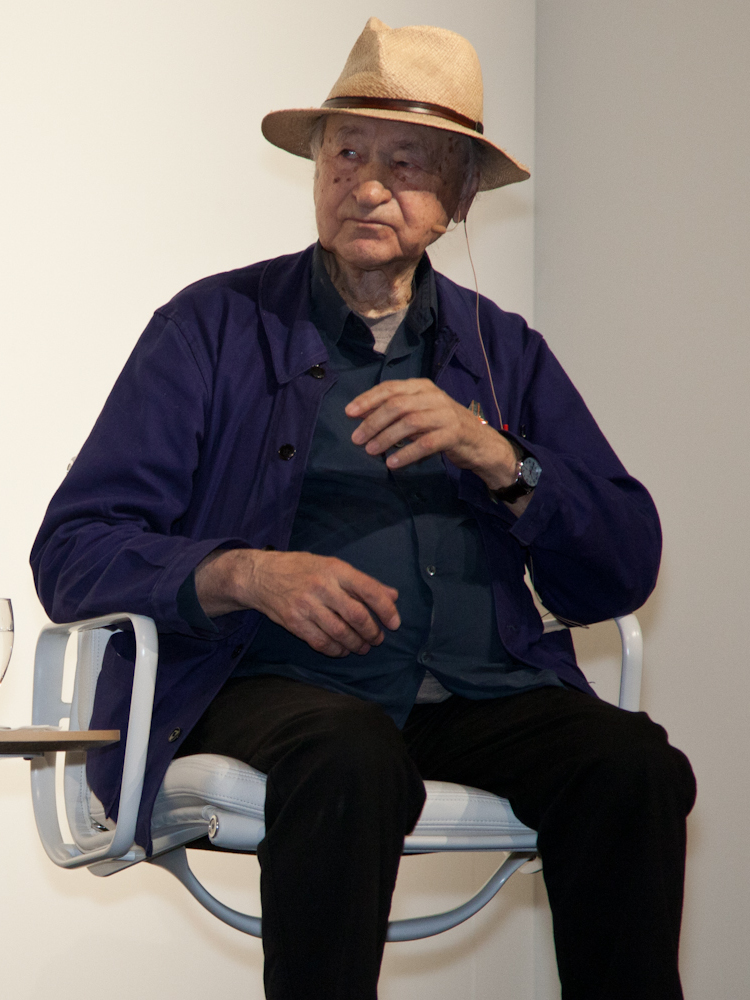
Director Jonas Mekas in 2011

=== Principal photography ===
Mekas shot Walden on a Bolex 16 mm camera between 1964 and 1968. He made use of many types of film stock based on availability, sometimes switching to black-and-white when he ran out of color stock. Mekas ordered one-light prints from film laboratories, and the lack of color timing meant that prints had very different tints. He had a Nagra and a Sony audio recorder with which he recorded sound from the scenes he was filming.

Mekas's cinematography differs sharply from the style of home movies. Where most hobbyists aim to replicate the look and feel of conventional studio movies, Mekas's camera work is aggressive and unstable, moving erratically in wild gestures. The improvisational rhythms of Marie Menken's camera work were a major influence on his style.

=== Post-production ===
As Mekas continued to film over the years, financial constraints limited his ability to make completed films. The Albright–Knox Art Gallery commissioned him to make a film for a celebration it was planning. The gallery gave him ten months to complete the project, with a small grant of around $2,000.

Musician John Cale recorded some background music for the film. Mekas doubled the speed of Cale's recording and used it for a 15-minute segment in Walden. While editing, he played vinyl records, a radio, and televisions in various combinations so that he could seize any opportunity to record interesting music for the film. He used the film stocks' different tints as a way to structure some of the sequences based on color.

Mekas continued editing the film after the premiere and added additional material, using about a third of all the footage he had shot. He finished working on it in 1969.

== Themes ==
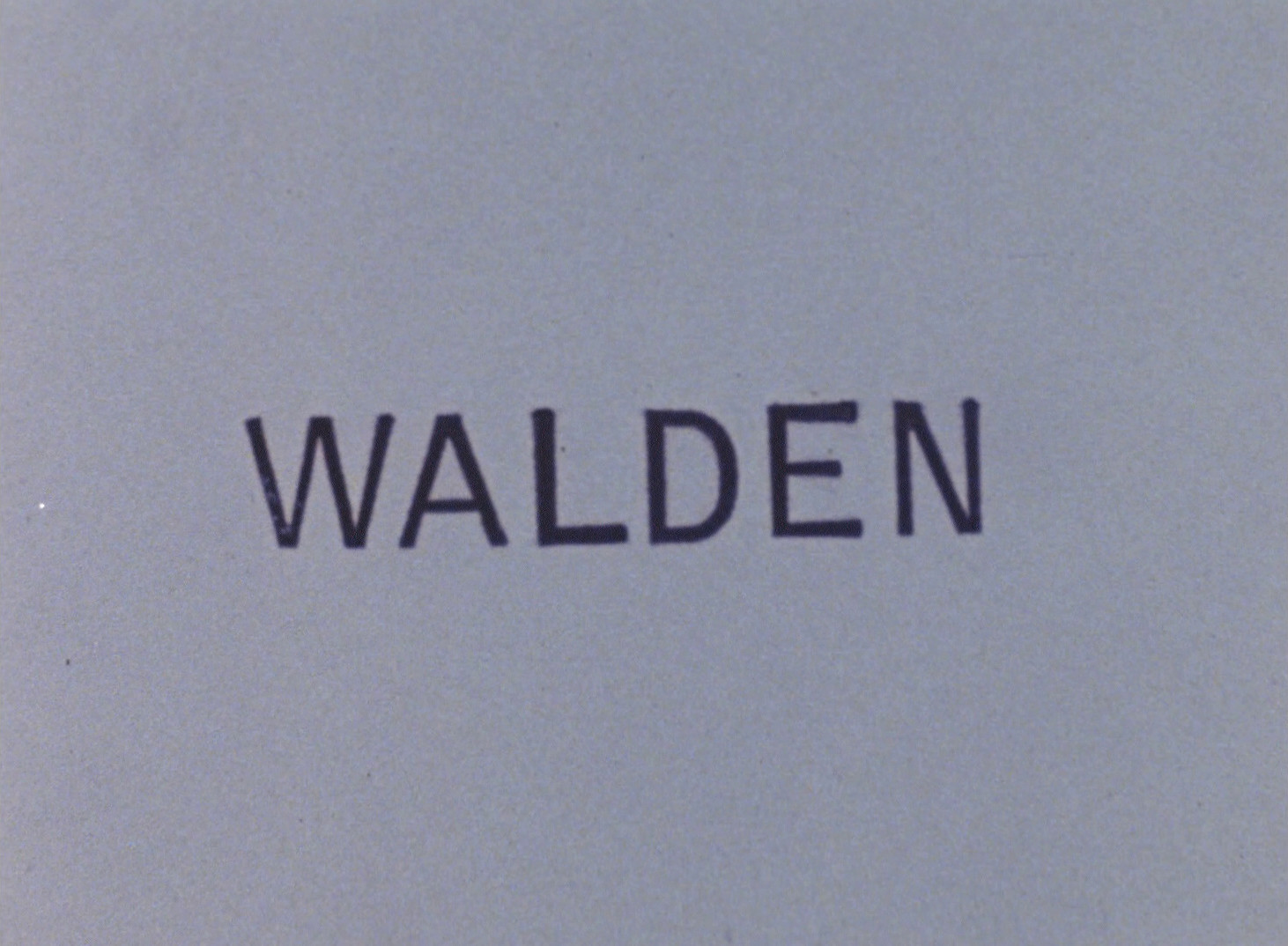
This intertitle appears next to scenes in Central Park.

Mekas titled his film after Thoreau's transcendentalist book Walden. Having first read the book in German during the 1940s, Mekas reread it in English in 1961. Thoreau's memoir became a central metaphor for Mekas's film. Both works emphasize a personal, first-person perspective. Mekas draws a connection between Walden Pond and Central Park through multiple intertitles labeling it "Walden". He explained that the association with Walden was not limited to the park:

To me Walden exists throughout the city. You can reduce the city to your own small world which others may never see. The usual reaction to seeing Walden is a question: "Is this New York?" Their New York is ugly buildings and depressing, morbid blocks of concrete and glass…In my New York there is a lot of nature. Walden is made up of bits of memories of what I wanted to see. I eliminated what I didn't want to see.

The film is dedicated to the Lumière brothers, whose early actuality films were precursors to documentary filmmaking. The Lumières' unstructured, single-shot works depicting informal moments served as an inspiration to avant-garde filmmakers working in new forms outside of mainstream cinema. Mekas also references cinema's past through his use of intertitles, associated with the silent era after they were largely abandoned in the transition to sound.

== Release ==
Before the invitation from the Albright–Knox Art Gallery, Mekas began distributing four short films based on the same footage: Cassis, Notes on the Circus, Report from Millbrook, and Hare Krishna. Different versions of Cassis and Report from Millbrook appear in Walden.

As part of the Buffalo Festival of the Arts Today, Mekas premiered the first cut of Walden at the Albright–Knox Art Gallery in March 1968, before producing the longer final cut. He distributed it through the Film-Makers' Cooperative. The film was selected to screen at the first International Underground Film Festival in London. Jackie Kennedy held a screening of it for Mother's Day. This led to a project, later abandoned, in which Mekas would have documented her life through home movies and family photos. Anthology Film Archives added Walden to its Essential Cinema Repertory collection. The Smithsonian American Art Museum purchased a print of Walden for its collection.

Re:Voir released Walden on VHS in 2003, along with The Walden Book. The book contains a scene-by-scene outline of the original cut of the film. Kino Lorber released the film on Blu-ray in November 2015.

=== Critical reception ===
Contemporary reaction to Walden was positive. Vincent Canby of The New York Times wrote that "Mekas has a remarkable gift for making us see, as if for the first time, what we've been looking at all our lives."

Critic Dave Kehr said that Walden "radiates sociability and warmth…Innocent of technique, it overflows with truth." J. Hoberman wrote that Mekas's camera technique was a breakthrough that "freed [him] from both conventional film technique and narrative restraint."
