= Naujosios Biržų žinios =

Lithuanian weekly newspaper

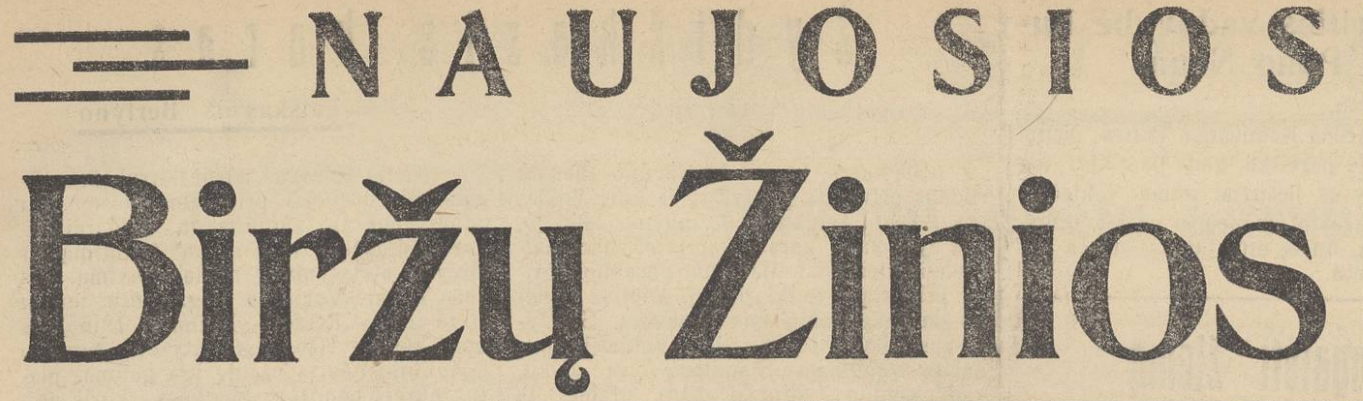
- Type: Initially bi-weekly, then weekly newspaper
- Founded: 1941
- Ceased publication: 1944
- Language: Lithuanian
- City: Biržai
- Country: Lithuania

The Naujosios Biržų žinios (literally: New Biržai news) was the weekly (first few months - bi-weekly) county newspaper on matters of society, politics and literature. It was published in the Biržai county. It was published from 1941 to 1944. A total of 131 issues were published. It was the continuation of the Biržų žinios that was published from 1922 to 1933. From 16 January 1943 to 8 July 1944, the newspaper was published under the old title Biržų žinios.

== History ==
The Lithuanian Activist Front published it. In its first issue on 19 July 1941, the newspaper greeted the Wehrmacht with: "Wir grüssen die siegreiche deutsche Wehrmacht!" (translates to: We salute the victorious German Wehrmacht!).

After the German invasion, the Naujosios Biržų Žinios wrote:

After the Bolsheviks fled, a list of changes in street names was found in the executive committee of Biržai town, in which we find the following changes: the existing Gediminas street is renamed to Kapsukas, Martynas Yčas – Four Communards, Officer Nastopka – Soviets, Jonas Yčas - Kirov, Vytautas Avenue – Stalin's Avenue, Reformed – Komsomol, Shops – Internationale, Markets - Lenin's and others ... Angry tongues said that the city of Biržai itself will be named Kerbelgrad.

Edited by Jonas Mekas (1941–1942), Julius Petronis, editor-in-chief Stasys Lipniūnas.

== Sources ==
- Tapinas, Laimonas (1997). "Panevėžio apygardos balsas" (PDF). Žurnalistikos enciklopedija (in Lithuanian). Vilnius: Pradai. ISBN 9986-776-62-7.
