= Jonas Mekas Visual Arts Center =

Arts centre in Lithuania

Coordinates: 54°41′33″N 25°15′51″E

- Established: 2007
- Location: Vilnius, Lithuania
- Type: Art museum

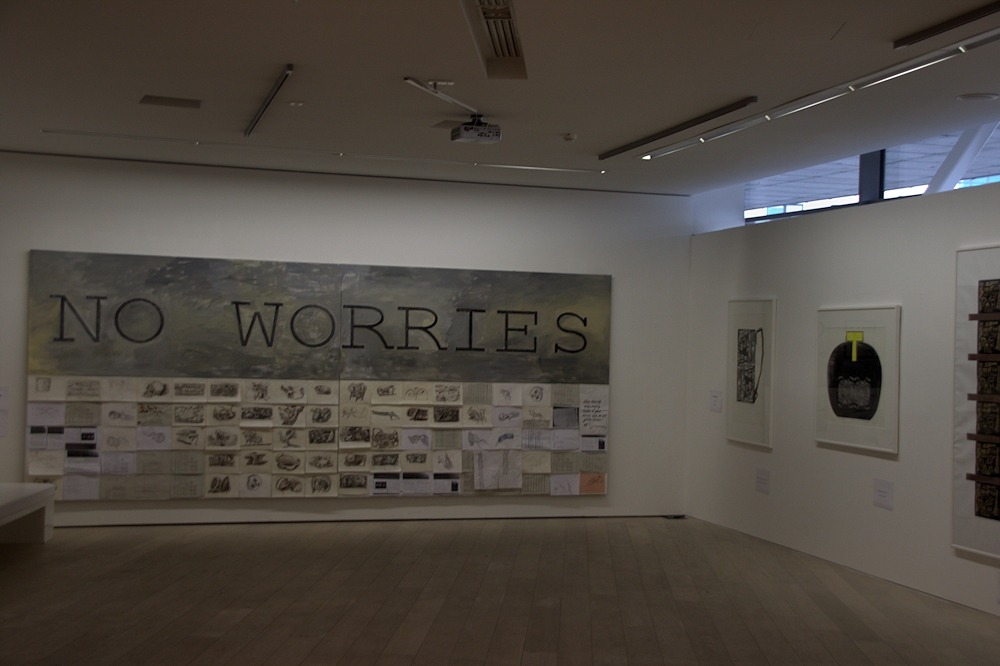
2012 exhibition at the Center

The Jonas Mekas Visual Arts Center (Lithuanian: Jono Meko Vizualiųjų Menų Centras) is an avant-garde arts centre in Vilnius, Lithuania.

The Jonas Mekas Visual Arts Center was opened on November 10, 2007, by acclaimed Lithuanian filmmaker Jonas Mekas. The premiere exhibition featured The Avant-Garde: From Futurism to Fluxus. Part of the recently purchased Fluxus art collection, consisting of 2,600 pieces, is presented to the public in the Visual Arts Center. The total Fluxus collection is worth 12 million litas (5,6 million USD).

According to Mekas, he envisioned it as a place for both living, working artists and for retrospective surveys of artists' work.

== See also ==
- Vilnius Guggenheim Hermitage Museum
