= Jonas in the Jungle =

- Directed by: Peter Sempel
- Starring: Jonas Mekas, Sebastian Mekas, H.U.Obrist M.Scorsese Patti Smith David Carradine G.Zevola Kaspar Koenig Julius Ziz
- Cinematography: Peter Sempel
- Edited by: Peter Sempel
- Music by: August Varkalis, Matthias Schuster, Abwaerts, DieSchmutzigeSchoenheitDerNatur, DirtBikes, Asmus Tietchens, TinyTim.
- Release date: 3 October 2013
- Running time: 98 minutes
- Country: Germany
- Languages: English, Italian, Lithuanian, German subtitles

Jonas in the Jungle is a 2013 documentary film by Peter Sempel about the filmmaker Jonas Mekas. It is part of a long term series of films about Mekas (Jonas in the Desert (1991), Jonas at the Ocean (2004)). The earlier films were focused more on Mekas' work, while this film is more about the life of the 'legend of film avant-garde' as he enters his 90s, still working, and still maintaining relevance in the modern world.

The film also explores the Anthology Film Archives, of which Mekas' was one of the cofounders.

The film premiered Oct 3, 2013, in Hamburg, Germany.
