= Sharon Gilbert =

American artist (1944–2005)

- Born: 1944; Brooklyn, New York
- Died: June 2005 (aged 60–61); Brooklyn, New York
- Citizenship: American
- Education: Cooper Union
- Occupations: Artist, writer
- Spouse: Vyt Bakaitis
- Children: 2

Sharon Gilbert (1944–2005) was a New York-based artist whose work included sculpture, collage, and art books. Her art employs information from print media and photocopy techniques to create socially critical content in her artwork, often from a feminist point of view. Focuses of her work include nuclear radiation poisoning, environmental pollution, chemical warfare, and police brutality. Her most noted work is A Nuclear Atlas (1982) published by the Women's Studio Workshop.

Gilbert's work has been exhibited at venues including the Brooklyn Museum, Museum of Modern Art, Yale University Art Gallery, Printed Matter, the Center for Book Arts, Centre Pompidou, and Harvard Art Museums, among others.

== Biography ==
Gilbert was born in Brooklyn, New York in 1944. Gilbert graduated with a Bachelor's of Fine Art from The Cooper Union in 1966.

She married Lithuanian poet, Vyt Bakaitis. They had two children. Gilbert died in June of 2005.

== Fellowships and art residencies ==
In 1982, Gilbert was awarded an artist residency at the Women's Studio Workshop. Gilbert produced A Nuclear Atlas during the residency. It was published and printed by Women's Studio Workshop.

In 1989, Gilbert was awarded an Artist's Fellowship in the Printmaking, Drawing, & Artist Books division from the New York Foundation for the Arts. A decade later, in 1999, Gilbert was awarded an artist residency at the Ragdale Foundation.

In 2000, Gilbert was selected for a residency at the Virginia Center for the Arts.

== Exhibitions ==
Date	Title	Gallery	Place	Notes
1986	Books by Artists	Centre Pompidou	Paris, France	Group exhibition
January 31, 1988 - April 19, 1988	Committed to Print	Museum of Modern Art	New York, New York	Group exhibition
April 7, 1990 - May 12, 1990	Book Arts in the USA	Center for Book Arts	New York, New York	Group exhibition
1991-1992	25 Years of Feminism, Women's Artist Series, 1971-1996	Rutgers University Libraries	New Brunswick, New Jersey	Group exhibition
March 7, 1992 - May 23, 1992	Completing the Circle: Artists' Books on the Environment	Minnesota Center for Book Arts	Minneapolis, Minnesota	Group exhibition
January 20, 1995 - March 26, 1995	Reinventing the Emblem: Contemporary Artists Recreate a Renaissance Idea	Yale University Art Gallery	New Haven, CT	Group exhibition
1999	Short of Rage: Photocollages	PABA Gallery	New Haven, CT	One person exhibition
February 3, 2000 - May 7, 2000	Working in Brooklyn: Artist Books	Brooklyn Museum	Brooklyn, New York	Group exhibition
2004	Focusing on the Environment, Spirituality, & Social Justice	Book Arts Gallery		Group exhibition - hosted online only
April 17, 2004 - August 15, 2004	Open House: Working in Brooklyn	Brooklyn Museum	Brooklyn, New York	Group exhibition
June 12, 2004 - August 9, 2004	Artists Books	Kunst Centret Silkeborg Bad	Silkeborg, Denmark	Group exhibition

== Book works ==
Year	Title	Notes
1979	3-Mile Island Reproductions	
1980	'80' Faces	
1980	Frei BUCH	
1980	Waste	
1980	Scrapbook of Freiburg	
1980	A Still Life Book	
1981	Via Air Tours	
1982	A Nuclear Atlas	Published by Women's Studio Workshop
1988	Poison America	
1989	Green The Fragile	
1990	Urgent Life	
1991	Action Poses	
1992	Urban Renewal	
1994	Working Time	
1997	Chemical Ways	
2001	Police (State) America	
2003	(So Quiet)	
