= Vyt Bakaitis =

American translator, editor, and poet (1940-2026)

Vyt Bakaitis (1940-2026) was an American translator, editor, and poet born in Lithuania who lived in New York City. His first collection of poetry City Country (1991) was followed by Deliberate Proof (2010). Thirst, the magazine he co-edited with Benjamin Sloan, lasted only a few issues, but his translations of Lithuanian poetry are significant; particularly the 20th-century anthology Breathing Free (2001), which he also edited. Three additional volumes he translated from the Lithuanian are by contemporary poets Jonas Mekas and Julius Keleras.

In 2022, he published Refuge and Occasion (SPD Press). He was married to the late artist Sharon Gilbert.

== Poetry ==
- Bakaitis, Vyt, City Country. New York City : Black Thistle Press, 1991. 146 p. ISBN 0-9628181-2-7
- Bakaitis, Vyt, Deliberate Proof. Brooklyn, NY : Lunar Chandelier Press, 2010. 135 p. ISBN 978-0-9846076-0-0

== Translations ==
- Gyvas atodūsis : lietuvių poezijos vertimai / sudarė ir į anglų kalbą vertė Vyt Bakaitis = Breathing free : poems from the Lithuanian / selected and translated by Vyt Bakaitis. Vilnius : Lietuvos Rašytojų sąjungos leidykla, 2001. 524 p. ISBN 9986-39-183-0
- Keleras, Julius, Eilėraščiai XL English & Lithuanian. XL Poems; translated from Lithuanian by Vyt Bakaitis; foreword by Rimvydas Šilbajoris. Vilnius : Lithuanian Writers' Association Press, 1998. 128 p. ISBN 9986-39-078-8
- Mekas, Jonas, Semeniškių idilės. English & Lithuanian. There is no Ithaca : Idylls of Semeniskiai & Reminiscences; translated from Lithuanian by Vyt Bakaitis; foreword by Czeslaw Milosz. New York City : Black Thistle Press, 1996. 181 p. ISBN 0-9628181-1-9
- Mekas, Jonas, Daybooks 1979-1972; translated from Lithuanian by Vyt Bakaitis; with illustrations. Brooklyn, NY : Portable Press at Yo-Yo Labs, 2003. Unpaginated
