= Deborah Colton Gallery =

Art gallery

Coordinates: 29.72774°N 95.41659°W

Deborah Colton Gallery, located in the West University neighborhood in Houston, Texas, showcases established and emerging contemporary artists from around the world who work in traditional mediums such as painting, works on paper, sculpture, video, and photography, as well as emerging forms such as performance, conceptual future media, and public space installations. Since its inception in 2000, Deborah Colton Gallery has sponsored exhibitions featuring artists from Asia, the Middle East, Russian, Canada, Latin America, and Europe; the Gallery also promotes Texas artists, providing a visual forum to raise awareness of both local and international cultures and promote cross-cultural exchange of ideas. In addition to exhibiting the works of affiliated artists, Deborah Colton Gallery provides consultation services to individuals, corporations, and institutions, helping them to acquire specific works through a comprehensive program of collecting.

Colton became interested in the international art scene while living in Tokyo and Bangkok, where she started a virtual gallery in 1998 featuring multimedia works by artists from China, Japan, Thailand, and other Asian countries. After moving to Houston in 2000, she opened the Deborah Colton Gallery and curated public space exhibitions in conjunction with local and global arts groups, including the exhibition “Thai Expressions in the City” featuring 16 Thai artists. The Deborah Colton Gallery has been a major player in the annual Houston arts event FotoFest, with the exhibit “Reviving Downtown” in 2004 and “Focus on Russia” featuring the works of Olga Tobreluts and Oleg Dou in 2012. In 2016 and 2017, exhibits included women artists of the African diaspora, Syrian artist Fadi Yazigi, and Houston-based artists from the 1970s and 80s.

On the national stage, Steven Zevitas wrote about Deborah Colton Gallery in HuffPost's Arts & Culture section. The Gallery also collaborated with Yoko Ono on her IMAGINE PEACE project, sponsoring an "imagine peace" billboard in Houston in 2011, and later again at the gallery in 2016.
