= Semeniškiai, Vilnius =

Semeniškiai
- Village
- Location within Lithuania
- Coordinates: 54°52′24″N 24°51′5″E
- Country: Lithuania
- County: Vilnius County
- Municipality: Širvintos District Municipality

Population (2011)
  - Total: 5
- Time zone: UTC+2 (EET)
  - Summer (DST): UTC+3 (EEST)

Semeniškiai is a village in Vilnius County, Lithuania. According to the 2011 census, the village has a population of 5 people.
