= Jonas Mekas =

Lithuanian-American filmmaker (1922–2019)

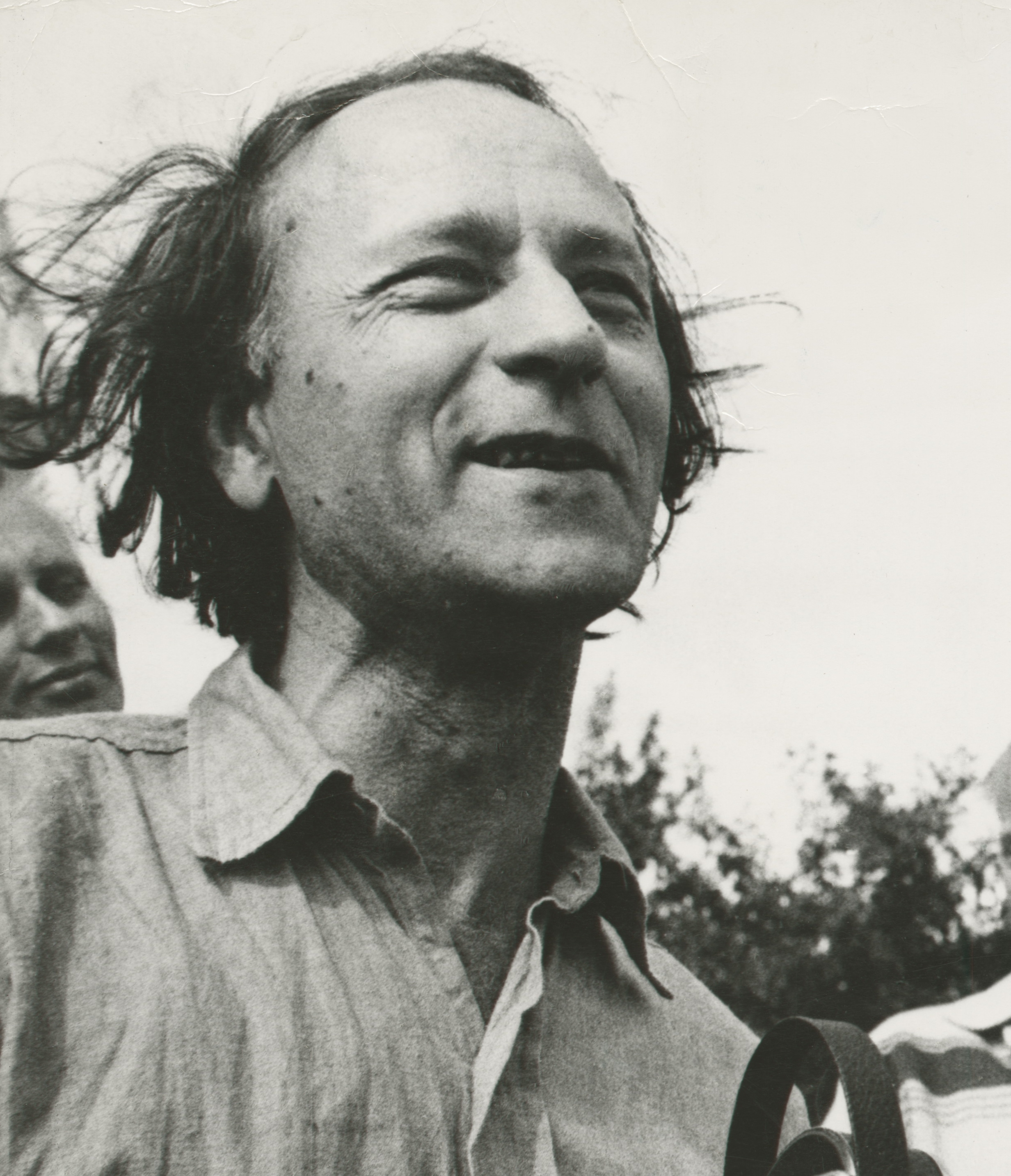
- Mekas in 1971
- Born: December 24, 1922; Semeniškiai, Lithuania
- Died: January 23, 2019 (aged 96); New York City, U.S.
- Education: University of Mainz
- Occupations: Poet; filmmaker; artist
- Years active: 1954–2019
- Movement: Avant-garde cinema
- Spouse: Hollis Melton (m. 1974)
- Children: 2
- Awards: Lithuanian National Prize (1995)

Signature
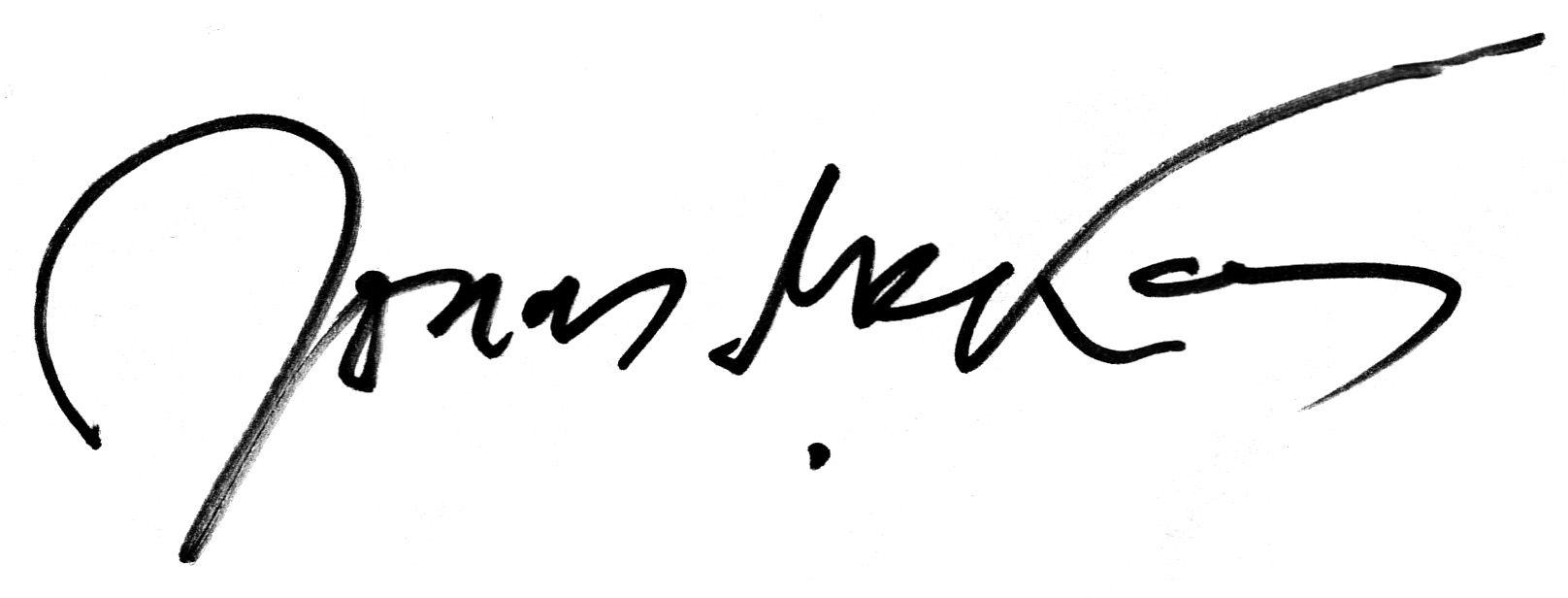

Jonas Mekas (/ˈmiːkɑːs/; Lithuanian: [ˈjonɐs ˈmækɐs]; December 24, 1922 – January 23, 2019) was a Lithuanian (fled the Soviet Regime) filmmaker, poet, and artist who has been called "the godfather of American avant-garde cinema". Mekas's work has been exhibited in museums and at festivals worldwide. Mekas was active in New York City, where he co-founded Anthology Film Archives, The Film-Makers' Cooperative, and the journal Film Culture. He was also the first film critic for The Village Voice.

In the 1960s, Mekas launched anti-censorship campaigns in defense of the LGBTQ-themed films of Jean Genet and Jack Smith, garnering support from cultural figures including Jean-Paul Sartre, Simone de Beauvoir, Norman Mailer, and Susan Sontag. Mekas mentored and supported many prominent artists and filmmakers, including Ken Jacobs, Peter Bogdanovich, Chantal Akerman, Richard Foreman, John Waters, Barbara Rubin, Yoko Ono, and Martin Scorsese. He helped launch the writing careers of the critics Andrew Sarris, Amy Taubin, and J. Hoberman.

During World War II, Mekas edited and contributed to two far-right, collaborationist newspapers under the Nazi occupation of Lithuania, the significance of which has been debated by historians.

His major films include The Brig (1964), Walden: Diaries Notes and Sketches (1968), and Reminiscences of a Journey to Lithuania (1972). His early poetry collection Idylls of Semeniskiai (1948) is a celebrated work in his native Lithuania.

In 2024, the Centre Pompidou dedicated its annual Poetry Day to Mekas, following past editions honoring figures such as Patti Smith and John Giorno. The event, which included readings, screenings, and performances celebrating his literary and cinematic legacy, was held across multiple cities, including Paris, Lviv, Seoul, Los Angeles, Vilnius, and Tehran.

== Early life ==
Mekas was born in Semeniškiai, the son of Elzbieta (Jašinskaitė) and Povilas Mekas on December 24, 1922. As a teenager, he attended the Biržai Gymnasium in Biržai, Lithuania. From 1941 to 1942, living under Nazi occupation, he co-edited and published in the culture section of Naujosios Biržų žinios, founded by the far-right, anti-semitic Lithuanian Activist Front. From 1943 to 1944, he co-edited and published in the culture section of Panevėžio apygardos balsas, a weekly local newspaper published by the fascist Lithuanian Nationalist Party.

In 1944, Mekas left Lithuania with his brother, Adolfas Mekas. They attempted to reach neutral Switzerland by means of Vienna, with fabricated student papers arranged by their uncle. Their train was stopped in Germany, and they were both imprisoned in a labor camp in Elmshorn, a suburb of Hamburg, for eight months. The brothers escaped and hid on a farm near the Danish border for two months until the end of the war. After the war, Mekas lived in displaced persons' camps in Wiesbaden and Kassel. From 1946 to 1948, he studied philosophy at the University of Mainz. By the end of 1949 his brother and he had both secured sponsorship through a job in Chicago and emigrated to the United States. When they arrived, the two decided to settle in Williamsburg, Brooklyn. Two weeks after his arrival, he borrowed money to buy his first Bolex 16mm camera and began recording moments of his life.

He discovered avant-garde film at venues such as Amos Vogel's pioneering Cinema 16, and he began curating avant-garde film screenings at Gallery East on Avenue A and Houston Street and at the Film Forum series at Carl Fisher Auditorium on 57th Street.

== Career ==
In 1954, Mekas and his brother Adolfas founded the journal Film Culture, and in 1958 he began writing his "Movie Journal" column for The Village Voice. In 1962, he co-founded The Film-Makers' Cooperative, and in 1964 the Filmmakers' Cinematheque, which eventually became Anthology Film Archives, one of the world's largest and most important repositories of avant-garde film. Along with Lionel Rogosin, he was part of the New American Cinema movement. He was a close collaborator with artists such as Marie Menken, Andy Warhol, Nico, Allen Ginsberg, Yoko Ono, John Lennon, Salvador Dalí, and fellow Lithuanian George Maciunas.

After leaving The Voice over an editorial dispute, for a short time he wrote a column for The SoHo Weekly News.

Mekas gave the film Heaven and Earth Magic its title in 1964/65.

In 1964, Mekas was arrested on obscenity charges for showing Flaming Creatures (1963) and Jean Genet's Un Chant d'Amour (1950). He launched a campaign against the censorship board, and for the next few years continued to exhibit films at the Filmmakers' Cinematheque, the Jewish Museum, and the Gallery of Modern Art. From 1964 to 1967, he organized the New American Cinema Expositions, which toured Europe and South America. In 1966, Mekas joined the Fluxhouse Cooperative, a group of residences and art studios begun by his fellow Lithuanian George Maciunas. Consisting of at least several buildings, the co-op is sometimes credited in the history of Manhattan's then-derelict Soho neighborhood.

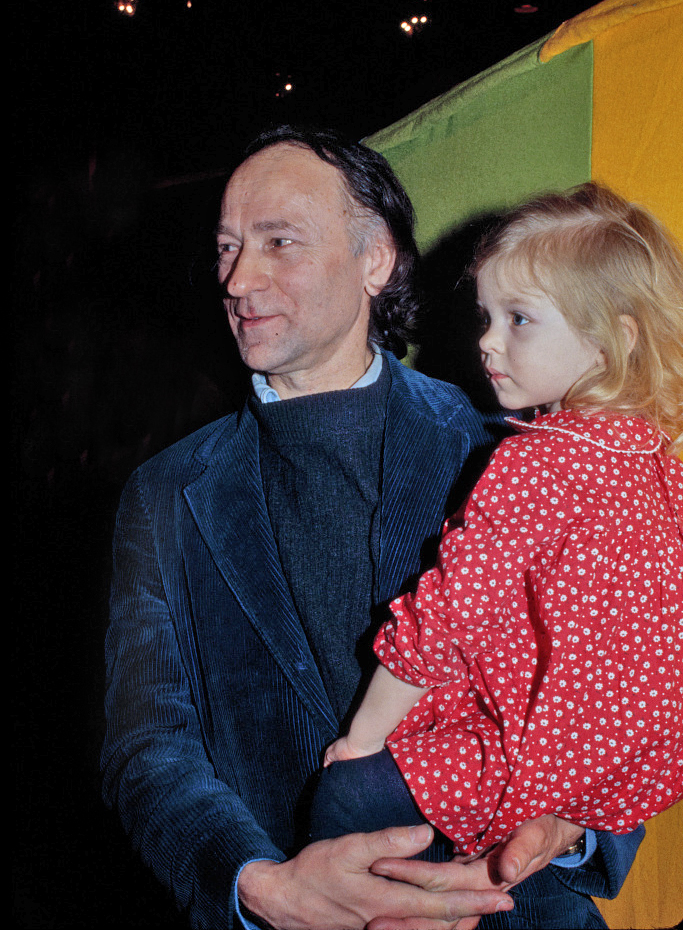
Mekas and his daughter Oona at a demonstration of new Polaroid products at the Waldorf Astoria New York, 1978

In 1970, Anthology Film Archives opened on 425 Lafayette Street as a film museum, screening space, and library, with Mekas as its director. Mekas, along with Stan Brakhage, Ken Kelman, Peter Kubelka, James Broughton, and P. Adams Sitney, began the ambitious Essential Cinema project at Anthology Film Archives to establish a canon of important cinematic works. Mekas's legs appeared in John Lennon and Yoko Ono's experimental film Up Your Legs Forever (1971).

As a filmmaker, Mekas's own output ranged from his early narrative film Guns of the Trees (1961) to "diary films" such as Walden (1969); Lost, Lost, Lost (1975), Reminiscences of a Journey to Lithuania (1972), Zefiro Torna (1992), and As I Was Moving Ahead Occasionally I Saw Brief Glimpses of Beauty (2000), which have been screened at festivals and museums around the world. Mekas' diary films offered a new perspective to the genre and portrayed the cinematic avant-garde scene of the 1960s.

Mekas expanded the scope of his practice with his later works of multi-monitor installations, sound immersion pieces and "frozen-film" prints. Together they offer a new experience of his classic films and a novel presentation of his more recent video work. His work has been exhibited at the 51st Venice Biennial, PS1 Contemporary Art Center, the Ludwig Museum, the Serpentine Gallery, the Jewish Museum, and the Jonas Mekas Visual Arts Center.

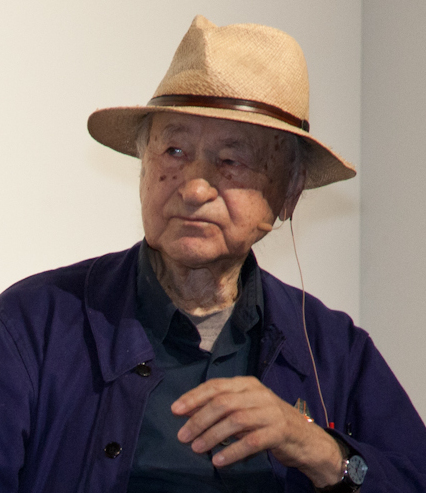
Mekas in 2011

In 2007, Mekas released one film every day on his website, a project he entitled "The 365 Day Project." The online diary is still ongoing on Jonas Mekas's official website. It was celebrated in 2015 with a show titled "The Internet Saga" which was curated by Francesco Urbano Ragazzi at Palazzo Foscari Contarini on the occasion of the 56th Venice Biennale of Visual Arts.

Beginning in the 1970s, Mekas taught film courses at the New School for Social Research, MIT, Cooper Union, and New York University.

Additionally, Mekas was a writer and published his poems and prose in Lithuanian, French, German, and English. His work has been translated into English by the Lithuanian-American poet Vyt Bakaitis in such collections as Daybooks: 1970-1972 (Portable Press at Yo-Yo Labs, 2003) and a bilingual anthology of modern Lithuanian verse, Gyvas atodūsis/Breathing Free, poems (Lietuvos, 2001). Mekas published many of his journals and diaries, including I Had Nowhere to Go: Diaries, 1944–1954 and Letters from Nowhere, as well as articles on film criticism, theory, and technique. In 2007, the Jonas Mekas Visual Arts Center was opened in Vilnius.

One of Mekas's last exhibitions, "Notes from Downtown," took place at James Fuentes Gallery on the Lower East Side in 2018. Mekas's last work, Requiem, premiered posthumously at The Shed in New York City on November 1, 2019. The 84-minute video was commissioned by The Shed and Festspielhaus Baden-Baden. It screened in tandem with a performance of Verdi's Requiem, conducted by Teodor Currentzis and performed by the musicAeterna orchestra.

In 2018, Ina Navazelskis, an oral historian at the National Institute for Holocaust Documentation, United States Holocaust Memorial Museum interviewed Mekas for their Jeff and Toby Herr Oral History Archive. There, he discussed his memories of World War II.

"Jonas Mekas: The Camera Was Always Running", the filmmaker's first retrospective in the United States, was organized by Guest Curator Kelly Taxter and on view at the Jewish Museum in the spring of 2022.

German filmmaker Peter Sempel has made four films about Mekas' works and life, Jonas in the Desert (1991), Jonas at the Ocean (2004), Jonas in the Jungle (2013), and Jonas in the Fields (2021).

In July 2025, the ShowRoom Cinema and Parlor Gallery in Asbury Park, New Jersey, hosted the Jonas Mekas Film Festival, featuring screenings of his diary films and a reception showcasing his photographic stills—attended by his son Sebastian Mekas.

== Personal life ==
Mekas married the poet and editor Hollis Melton on June 7, 1974; the couple later divorced. They had two children, a daughter, Oona, and a son, Sebastian, both of which frequently appear in his "diary films". In a late interview with Alain Elkann, Mekas described his daughter Oona as "an actress and a film-maker operating from Los Angeles" and his son Sebastian as living with him in New York after having studied mathematics in Beijing and then linguistics, while noting that his wife was a "very good photographer.".

His adult children, along with Melton and other close family, frequently feature in his works. They have recalled his sense of belonging within the downtown New York art "family", describing it as a mixed, sometimes difficult circle of figures around Jack Smith, Andy Warhol, The Velvet Underground, and Bob Dylan in which his household played a key role.

In interviews and the documentary Fragments of Paradise, Mekas and his children emphasize that he "filmed moments of life" compulsively and that the camera often felt like his closest companion, a habit his family experienced as a constant presence in their home.

Mekas died at his home in Brooklyn on January 23, 2019, at the age of 96.

== Controversy over World War II activities ==
Mekas long maintained that, while working for local newspapers, he also clandestinely transcribed BBC broadcasts in support of the underground. In 2018, an article in the New York Review of Books by historian Michael Casper challenged Mekas's versions of his wartime activities. Casper claims that Mekas participated "in an underground movement in Biržai that supported the 1941 Nazi invasion of Soviet Lithuania" and worked for "two ultranationalist and Nazi propaganda newspapers, until he fled Lithuania in 1944." Casper noted that Mekas's publications in these newspapers were not anti-Semitic.

At the time, art critic and historian Barry Schwabsky penned a letter to the editor criticizing Casper's essay. He and Casper had an exchange of letters in the New York Review of Books. The United States Holocaust Memorial Museum's website biography of Mekas maintains that he participated in both the anti-Soviet and anti-Nazi undergrounds. Following the 2022 exhibition at the Jewish Museum in New York, Casper published an article entitled "World War II Revisionism at the Jewish Museum" in Jewish Currents. There, he argued that the "art world at large remains deeply invested in the story of Mekas the anti-Nazi", thus perpetuating revisionism not only erasing his roles, but casting him as an anti-Nazi hero.

In an article for the Jewish Telegraphic Agency on Casper's charges against the Jewish Museum, journalist Asaf Shalev also pointed out that two different memos were circulated among the museum employees to dismiss Casper's article. Kelly Taxter, the guest curator of the exhibit, responded to Casper's historical research by saying that "the tone of these emails is often aggressive." This was based on emails shared by the Mekas family, which Shalev also had access to, although Shalev wrote that "Nothing on there looked to me like Casper was bullying Mekas or that Mekas get bullied."

Sovietologist Robert van Voren voiced criticisms of Casper's articles. Saulius Sužiedėlis argued, "The review format of the articles allowed Casper to present judgements without the burden of buttressing his allegations with relevant sources and requisite detail. The resulting narrative turns Jonas Mekas's life as a young man into something that it was not."

The film scholars J. Hoberman and B. Ruby Rich have shown support for Casper's findings. An article in Film Quarterly, B. Ruby Rich stated that, upon Casper's article, "The wagons started circling immediately to protect a sacred figure of the avant-garde." In 2023, both Casper and Sužiedėlis shared their research and perspectives on Mekas in separate interviews with Lithuanian journalist Karolis Vyšniauskas.

== Awards and honors ==
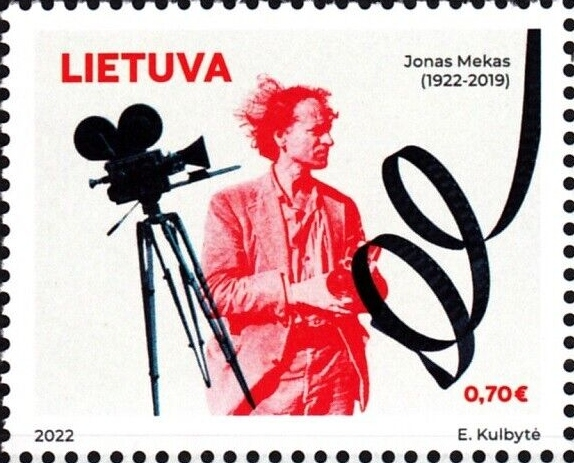
Mekas on a 2022 stamp of Lithuania

- Guggenheim Fellowship (1977)
- Creative Arts Award, Brandeis University (1977)
- Mel Novikoff Award, San Francisco Film Festival (1992)
- Lithuanian National Prize, Lithuania (1995)
- Doctor of Fine Arts, Honoris Causa, Kansas City Art Institute (1996)
- Special Tribute, New York Film Critics Circle Awards (1996)
- Pier Paolo Pasolini Award, Paris (1997)
- International Documentary Film Association Award, Los Angeles (1997)
- Governors Award from the Skowhegan School of Painting and Sculpture, Maine (1997)
- Atrium Doctoris Honoris Causa, Vytautas Magnus University, Lithuania (1997)
- Represented Lithuania at the 51st International Art Exhibition Venice Biennial (2005)
- United States National Film Preservation Board selects Reminiscences of a Journey to Lithuania for preservation in the Library of Congress' National Film Registry (2006)
- Los Angeles Film Critics Association's Award (2006)
- Austrian Decoration for Science and Art (2008)
- Baltic Cultural Achievement Award for Outstanding Contributions to the field of Arts and Science (2008)
- Life Achievement Award at the second annual Rob Pruitt's Art Awards (2010)
- George Eastman Honorary Scholar Award (2011)
- 'Carry your Light and Believe' Award, Ministry of Culture, Lithuania (2012)
- Commandeur de l'Ordre des Arts et Lettres, Ministry of Culture, France (2013)

== Filmography ==
Sources:

- Guns of the Trees (1962) - 1 hour 15 minutes
- Film Magazine of the Arts (1963) - 20 minutes
- The Brig (1964) - 1 hour 8 minutes
- Empire (1964) - 8 hours 5 minutes
- Award Presentation to Andy Warhol (1964) - 12 minutes
- Report from Millbrook (1964–65) - 12 minutes
- Hare Krishna (1966) - 4 minutes
- Notes on the Circus (1966) - 12 minutes
- Cassis (1966) - 4 minutes
- The Italian Notebook (1967) - 15 minutes
- Time and Fortune Vietnam Newsreel (1968) - 4 minutes
- Walden (Diaries, Notes, and Sketches) (1969) - 3 hours
- Reminiscences of a Journey to Lithuania (1971–72) - 1 hour 22 minutes
- Lost, Lost, Lost (1976) - 2 hours 58 minutes
- In Between: 1964–8 (1978) - 52 minutes
- Notes for Jerome (1978) - 45 minutes
- Paradise Not Yet Lost (also known as Oona's Third Year) (1979) - 1 hour 36 minutes
- Street Songs (1966/1983) - 10 minutes
- Cups/Saucers/Dancers/Radio (1965/1983) - 23 minutes
- Erik Hawkins: Excerpts from "Here and Now with Watchers"/Lucia Dlugoszewski Performs (1983) - 6 minutes
- He Stands in a Desert Counting the Seconds of His Life (1969/1986) - 2 hours 30 minutes
- A Walk (1990) - 58 minutes, video
- Scenes from the Life of Andy Warhol (1990) - 35 minutes
- Mob of Angels/The Baptism (1991) - 1 hour, video
- Dr. Carl G. Jung or Lapis Philosophorum (1991) - 29 minutes
- Quartet Number One (1991) - 8 minutes
- Mob of Angels at St. Ann (1992) - 1 hour, video
- Zefiro Torna or Scenes from the Life of George Maciunas (1992) - 34 minutes
- The Education of Sebastian or Egypt Regained (1992) - 3 hours 48 minutes
- He Travels. In Search of... (1994) - 2 hours
- Imperfect 3-Image Films (1995) - 6 minutes
- On My Way to Fujiyama I Met... (1995) - 25 minutes
- Happy Birthday to John (1996) - 24 minutes
- Memories of Frankenstein (1996) - 1 hour 35 minutes
- Birth of a Nation (1997) - 1 hour 25 minutes
- Scenes from Allen's Last Three Days on Earth as a Spirit (1997) - 1 hour 7 minutes
- Letter from Nowhere – Laiskas is Niekur N.1 (1997) - 1 hour 15 minutes
- Silence, Please (2000) - 6 minutes, video
- Requiem for a Manual Typewriter (2000) - 19 minutes, video
- Remedy for Melancholy (2000) - 20 minutes
- Symphony of Joy (1997) - 1 hour 15 minutes
- Song of Avignon (1998) - 5 minutes
- Laboratorium (1999) - 1 hour 3 minutes
- Autobiography of a Man Who Carried His Memory in His Eyes (2000) - 53 minutes
- This Side of Paradise (1999) - 35 minutes
- Notes on Andy's Factory (1999) - 1 hour 4 minutes
- Mysteries (1966–2001) - 34 minutes
- As I Was Moving Ahead Occasionally I Saw Brief Glimpses of Beauty (2000) - 4 hours 48 minutes
- Ein Maerchen (2001) - 6 minutes, video
- Letter to Penny Arcade (2001) - 14 minutes 33 seconds, video
- Williamsburg, Brooklyn (1950–2003) - 15 minutes
- Ar Buvo Karas? (2002) - 2 hours 28 minutes
- Travel Songs 1967-1981 (2003) - 28 minutes
- Notes on an American Film Director at Work (2008) - 64 minutes
- Father and Daughter (2005) - 4 minutes 30 seconds, video
- Scenes from the Life of Hermann Nitsch (2005) - 58 minutes, film and video
- First Forty (2006) - [durations vary]
- 365 Day Project (2007) - [durations vary for each of the 365 short films]
- WTC Haikus (2010) - 14 minutes
- Sleepless Nights Stories (Premiere at the Berlinale 2011) - 1 hour 54 minutes
- My Paris Movie (2011) - 2 hours 39 minutes
- My Mars Bar Movie (2011) - 1 hour 27 minutes
- Correspondences: José Luis Guerin and Jonas Mekas (2011) - 1 hour 40 minutes
- Re: George Maciunas and Fluxus (2011) - 1 hour 27 minutes
- Mont Ventoux (2011) - 3 minutes
- Happy Easter Ride (2012) - 18 minutes
- Reminiszenzen aus Deutschland (2012) - 25 minutes
- Out-takes from the Life of a Happy Man (2012) - 1 hour 8 minutes
- Requiem (2019) - 1 hour 24 minutes

== List of exhibitions ==
Sources:

- Hara Museum of Contemporary Art, Tokyo (1983)
- Galerie National du Jeu de Paume, Paris (1992)
- agnès b. Galerie du Jour, Paris (1992)
- Still Gallery, Edinburgh (1992)
- Laurence Miller, New York (1992)
- Metropolitan Museum of Photography, Tokyo (1992)
- Madrid Art Fair (1997)
- Museum of Contemporary Art, Vilnius (1997)
- "Le Printemps de Cahors," Musée de Cahors Henri-Martin (1998)
- Gandy Gallery, Prague (1998)
- Susan Inglett Gallery, New York (1999)
- Pupelis Gallery, Obeliai, Lithuania (1999)
- agnès b. Galerie du Jour, Paris (1999)
- "La Beautè" festival, Avignon. Films and installation (2000)
- "Laboratorium," Antwerp (2000)
- "Voilà," Musée d'Art Moderne de la Ville de Paris (2000)
- agnès b Galerie du jour, FIAC art fair, Paris (2000)
- Maison Européenne de la Photographie, Paris (2002)
- Documenta 11, Kassel (2002)
- "Jonas Mekas: A Camera for Jonas," Musée d'Art Moderne de la Ville de Paris (2003)
- Utopia Station Pavilion, Venice Biennale. Installation (2003)
- "Dedication to Fernand Léger," Museum of Contemporary Art, Vilnius (2003)
- Sideshow Gallery, Williamsburg, Brooklyn. Frozen film frames (2003)
- Maison Européenne de la Photographie, Paris. Frozen film frames (2003)
- "Fables de l'Identité," Centre National de la Photographie, Paris. Frozen film frames (2003)
- "Farewell to Soho" Moderna Museet, Stockholm (2005)
- "Fragments of Paradise," Maya Stendhal Gallery, New York (2005)
- "As I Was Moving Ahead" representing Lithuania at the 51st edition of the Venice Biennale (2005)
- "Destruction Quartet," Darren Knight Gallery, Sydney (2006)
- "Onestar Stop," Galerie Erna Hécey, Brussels (2006)
- "The Expanded Eye," Kusthalle Zürich (2006)
- Baltic Art Center, Visby (2006)
- Hirshhorn Museum, Washington D.C. (2006)
- "To New York with Love," Gallery Toki no Wasuremono, Tokyo (2006)
- "He Stands in the Desert Counting the Seconds of his Life," Tamayo Contemporary Art Museum, Mexico City.
- "The Diary Film," Göteborgs Konsthall, Sweden (2006)
- "It All Comes Back Now in Glimpses," Sketch Gallery, London (2006)
- "Brief Glimpses of Beauty," Mead Gallery, Warwick Arts Center, UK (2006)
- Centrum Sztuki Współczesnej Zamek Ujazdowski, Warsaw (2006)
- "Recent Work," Maya Stendhal Gallery, New York (2007)
- Serpentine Gallery, London (2007)
- The Film Gallery, FIAC art fair, Paris (2007)
- "Jonas Mekas: The Beauty of Friends being Together," MoMA/P.S.1 (2007)
- Jonas Mekas Visual Arts Center, Vilnius (2007)
- "My Night Life" (with Auguste Varkalis), The Film Gallery, Paris (2007)
- Fondazione Ragghianti, Lucca (2008)
- Museum Ludwig, Cologne (2008)
- "1968," Kunsthalle Bielefeld, Germany (2009)
- "A Few Things I Want to Share with You, My Paris Friends," agnès b. Galerie du jour, Paris (2009)
- "The Beast," FIAC art fair, The Film Gallery, Paris (2009)
- "Destruction Quartet," James Fuentes Gallery, New York (2009)
- "1989," Kunsthalle Wien (2009)
- "Jonas Mekas," Gallery Toki no Wasuremono, Tokyo (2009)
- "To New York with Love," Bas Fisher Invitational, Miami (2009)
- "Destruction Quartet," Kings County Biennial, Brooklyn (2009)
- "Cassis," James Fuentes Gallery, New York Armory Show (2010)
- The Brucennial, New York (2010)
- "To New York with Love," James Fuentes Gallery, New York (2010)
- "Musique Plastique," agnès b. Galerie du jour, Paris (2011)
- agnès b. Howard Street boutique, New York (2011)
- "This Side of Paradise," agnès b. Rue du Jour boutique, Paris (2011)
- "Portraits: Jonas Mekas and Robert Polidori," Edwynn Houk Gallery, New York (2012)
- "Musique Plastique," agnès b. Howard Street boutique, New York (2012)
- "The 365 Day Project," 2B Gallery, Budapest (2012)
- "Reminiszenzen aus Deutschland," Stadtmuseum, Wiesbaden (2012)
- "Prisiminimai iš Vokietijos," Jonas Mekas Visual Arts Center, Vilnius (2012)
- "Images out of Darkness," James Fuentes Gallery, New York (2012)
- Serpentine Gallery, London (2012)
- "The 365 Day Project," Centre Pompidou, Paris (2012)
- DOX Centre for Contemporary Art, Prague (2013)
- MUAC, Mexico City (2013)
- "I Lift My Glass of Wine to You, My Vienna Friends!," Krinzinger Projekte, Vienna (2013)
- Paris Photo L.A., Deborah Colton Gallery, Los Angeles (2013)
- "Outlaw: New Works," Microscope Gallery, Brooklyn (2013)
- agnès b. Marseille (2013)
- "The Sixties Quartet," KIASMA, Helsinki (2013)
- "Let Me Introduce Myself, My Russian Friends!" State Hermitage Museum, Saint Petersburg (2013)
- "Jonas Mekas: In Praise of the Ordinary," The Phi Centre, Montreal (2013)
- "Jonas Mekas / The Fluxus Wall," Bozar Centre for Fine Arts, Brussels (2013)
- "Life Goes On... I Keep Singing," Deborah Colton Gallery, Houston (2013)
- "Jonas Mekas: One Man Show," Cēsis Arts Festival, Latvia (2014)
- "365 Day Project," ZKM, Karlsruhe (2014)
- "Frozen Film Frames: Portraits of Filmmakers," Schnitzer Museum of Art, Eugene, Oregon (2015)
- Internet Saga Pavilion, Venice, Italy (2015)
- "All These Images, These Sounds," A Palazzo Gallery, Brescia, Italy (2015)
- “Let Me Introduce Myself,” Nina Johnson Gallery, Miami (2016)
- Documenta 14, Athens and Kassel (2017)
- “I Sing I Celebrate,” La Neomudéjar, Madrid (2017)
- Boo-Hooray Summer Rental, Montauk (2017)
- “Blue, Yellow, Red, Purple,” Missoni, New York City (2017)
- “Again Again It All Comes Back To Me In Brief Glimpses,” MMCA, Seoul (2017)
- “Like a Flower in a Field,” Reykjavik International Film Festival, Iceland (2018)
- “Jonas Mekas: Notes from Downtown,” James Fuentes Gallery, New York City (2018)
- “Jonas Mekas: let me dream utopias,” Rupert, Vilnius, Lithuania (2019)
- “Jonas Mekas: Ahead, ahead we move through the stormy seas with all sails open,” Apalazzo Gallery, Brescia, Italy (2020)
- “Jonas Mekas and the New York Avant-Garde,” National Gallery of Art, Vilnius, Lithuania (2021)
