= Adolfas Mekas =

American film director (1925–2011)

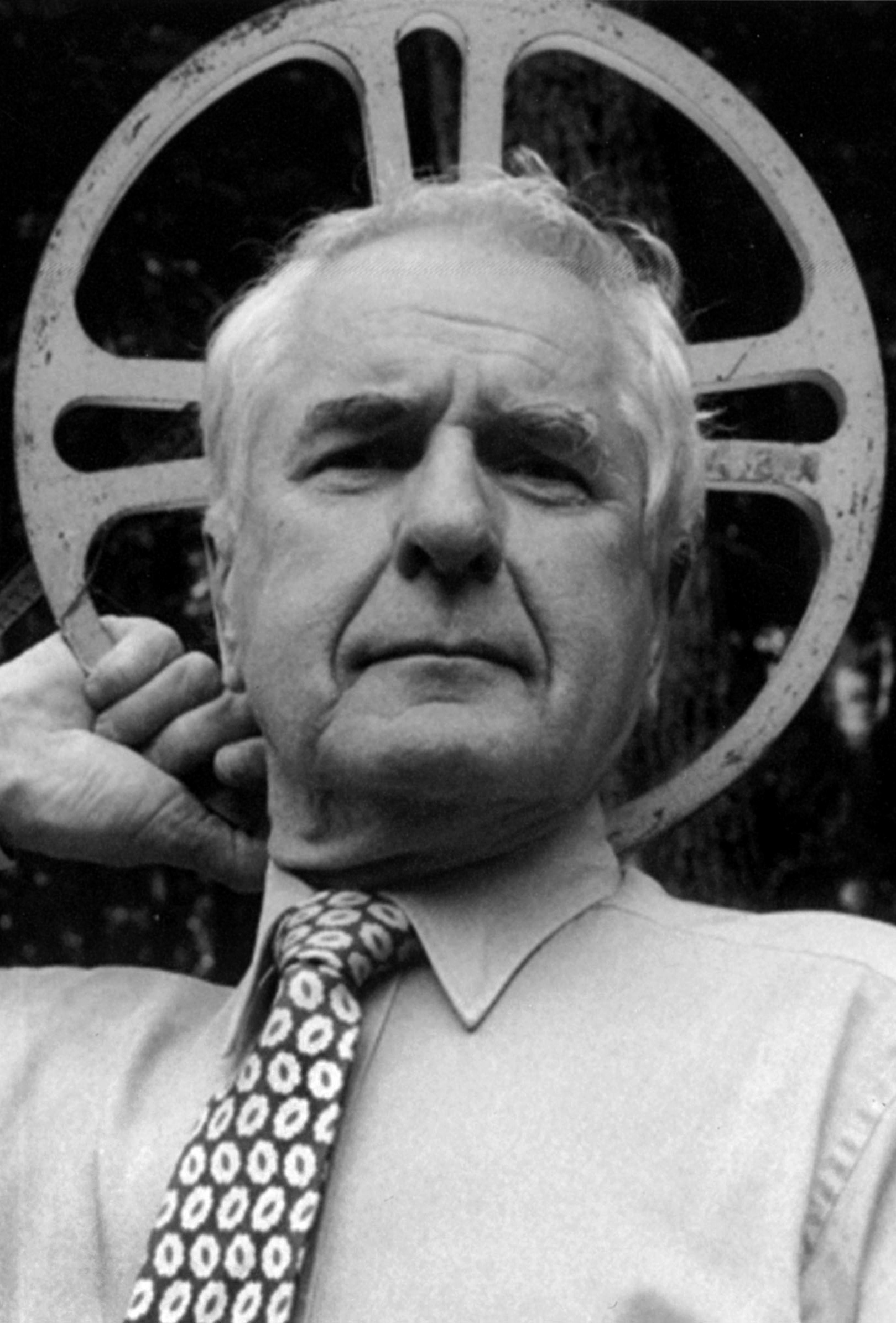
- Born: 30 September 1925; Semeniškiai, Lithuania
- Died: 31 May 2011 (aged 85); Poughkeepsie, New York, U.S.
- Resting place: Bard College Cemetery, Annandale-on-Hudson, New York
- Spouse: Pola Chapelle (m. 1965)
- Children: Sean mekas
- Relatives: Jonas Mekas (brother)

Adolfas Mekas (30 September 1925 – 31 May 2011) was a Lithuanian-born American filmmaker, writer, director, editor, actor and educator. With his brother Jonas Mekas, he founded the magazine Film Culture, as well as the Film-Makers' Cooperative and was associated with George Maciunas and the Fluxus art movement at its beginning. He made several short films, culminating in the feature Hallelujah the Hills in 1963, which was played at the Cannes Film Festival of that year and is now considered a classic of American film.

== Early life ==
Mekas was born on a farm in Semeniškiai, Lithuania, the son of Elzbieta (Jašinskaitė) and Povilas Mekas. His sister was Elžbieta and brothers were Povilas, Petras, Kostas and Jonas. Adolfas was the youngest in the family.

At 14 years old, while still in Lithuania, Mekas saw his first film, Captain Blood starring Errol Flynn. In July 1944, Adolfas and his brother Jonas fled the approaching Red Army, going West in an attempt to reach neutral Switzerland, holding fabricated student papers from the University of Vienna. Their train was redirected and they spent eight months in a forced labor camp near Hamburg, and then entered several displaced persons camps. While in Germany, Adolfas attended classes in literature and theater arts and philosophy in Mainz, where he also wrote and published short stories, novels, and children's books. Having been refused entry into Israel, New Zealand, and Canada, Mekas was sent as a refugee to the United States, where he arrived with his brother at the end of 1949.

== Early years in the United States ==
In the spring of 1950 he purchased a 16mm Bolex camera and took up photography. At the same time, he wrote more than 50 scripts and attended film screenings at the Museum of Modern Art, Cinema 16, Thalia, Stanley, and other venues. He supported himself with a variety of jobs, including washing dishes and working as a foreman in a Castro Convertible factory. He was drafted into the United States Army during the Korean War, where he was assigned to the Signal Corps, and sailed for France in September 1951. On his return to the United States from Europe in 1953, he continued writing and filming and also began organizing the American Film House, along with his brother Jonas. Though the brothers approached many independent filmmakers, none were interested in collaborating on the project. They continued looking for a location in Manhattan for over a year, without success. In 1954 they abandoned the idea of the American Film House and with the money they had borrowed for the project started a film society, which they called the Film Forum. Mekas wrote of the period "We showed films at public schools and at Carl Fischer Hall on 57th Street, wherever we could, until we went bankrupt in the middle of the second film series later in the year just in time to start Film Culture magazine, the first issue of which came out in December 1954."

Film Culture was an outlet for anyone who had something to say about film. P. Adams Sitney wrote of the project "The brothers little realized at the time that they were actually elevating American culture to new heights, and marshaling a level of film criticism that has never been equaled since in our country." Adolfas served as editor of Film Culture until 1968.

Together with his brother in the early 50s, Adolfas wrote, directed and photographed a number of films that were never finished, including his first script in 1950 – Lost, Lost, Lost, Lost, which was later renamed Lost, Lost, Lost, and in 1951, Grand Street – both films documented the fate of displaced persons, old and new immigrants to Brooklyn. In 1953, together with Jonas he wrote, directed and edited a somber romance called Silent Journey, in which he played a principal role. In 1955, with Jonas and Edouard de Laurot, he began Film Essay, a spoof of American avant-garde film of that time.

During those years, he made short trips to Canada to visit friends and find material for the novel he was writing, A Canadian Romance. In 1958 he left New York to spend a year in Oaxaca, Mexico. Living on $1 a day, he was free to write, and he wrote short stories, later published, and began longer works, notably his diaristic work George the Man. While in Mexico, he finished the screenplay for Hallelujah the Hills. In 1959 he returned to the States and to the daily struggle to live and create and express the needs of the growing movement of independent and avant-garde filmmakers in New York.

On 28 September 1960, Adolfas, Jonas and producer Lew Allen hosted a group of 20 independent filmmakers at the Producers Theatre on West 16th Street and by unanimous vote bound themselves into the free and open organization of the New American Cinema. The second meeting took place on September 30 at the Bleecker Street Cinema and the first draft of the statement of aims was read, discussed and approved, and later published in Film Culture. Subsequently, a third and fourth meeting took place, leading to the establishment in 1962 of the Film-makers' Co-op, a distribution organization for the dissemination of independent, experimental and avant-garde films. The New York group included, among others, Lionel Rogosin, Shirley Clarke, Robert Frank, Maya Deren, Peter Bogdanovich and Daniel Talbot.

== Middle years in the United States ==
In 1961 Jonas began shooting Guns of the Trees. Mekas assisted him in all stages of production, writing and editing, and played one of the lead roles in the film. Other actors were Ben Carruthers, Frances Stillman and Argus Speare Juilliard. The controversial film was considered to be a "poetic-political manifesto."

In 1963 Mekas's film Hallelujah the Hills was the surprise hit of the Cannes Festival. Subsequently, it was invited to 27 film festivals, including the first New York Film Festival, the London Festival, the Montreal International Film Festival, the Mannheim Film Festival and the Bombay Film Festival; it won the Silver Sail at the Locarno Festival, was invited to a Command Screening for the Royal Family at Buckingham Palace and had a 15-week run at the Fifth Avenue cinema in New York. Time called it "... the weirdest, wooziest, wackiest screen comedy of 1963." Jean-Luc Godard wrote in Cahiers du Cinéma "Hallelujah proved clearly that Adolfas is someone to be reckoned with. He is a master in the field of pure invention, that is to say, in working dangerously – 'without a net.' His film, made according to the good old principle – one idea for each shot – has the lovely scent of fresh ingenuity and crafty sweetness."

In 1964 Mekas was hired as post-production coordinator and editor of the independent comedy drama Goldstein, which was co-directed by Ben Manaster and Philip Kaufman. Mekas created a Jewish fable, edited as a fugue.

The same year Mekas edited sound and film footage taken by brother Jonas of a performance of The Brig, directed by Judith Malina. It was selected for the New York Film Festival, the London Festival, the Moscow Festival and others and took first prize at the Venice Festival in the documentary category. Variety described it as "...one of the more remarkable films in the entire fest (NY Film Festival '64) is the Jonas and Adolfas Mekas film version of The Living Theatre's The Brig. This filmed-on-the-stage version of a play....has a vitality as film which is unique and does in cinema terms what the seekers for new form in plays and novels are attempting."

In March 1964 he met Pola Chapelle, who became his wife. They were separated before their marriage by the production of his second feature film, The Double Barreled Detective Story, but never again during their long lifetime together. A replica nineteenth-century town was built just outside Johnstown, Pennsylvania, for the location of the film. The screenplay was based on a Mark Twain short story and the film starred Hurd Hatfield and Greta Thyssen. In spite of the performance of Hurd Hatfield, who played two parts in the film, there were problems with the production from the start, and Mekas never got to do a final cut. The producers took the film out of his hands and refused to release it. Nonetheless, with help from his friends, he was able to take a print to the Venice Film Festival of 1965. Gene Moskowitz in Variety wrote "The Double Barreled Detective Story is authentic Mark Twain-esque with all the rustic humor of the 1880s....Mekas shows he has a way with parody and he gets disarmingly innocent performances from his cast."

In the same year Mekas directed Pola Chapelle in a short parody of Italian art films of the time, written by Peter Stone for the Broadway show Skyscraper which starred Julie Harris and Charles Nelson Reilly. Paul Sorvino played opposite Pola in the three-minute film clip which won praise from the critics. NY World Telegram described it as "... a priceless film sequence satirizing Italian movies, for some of the heartiest laughs of the evening." Julius Novick wrote in Village Voice "...there is a film sequence made by Adolfas Mekas: a very funny parody of an Italian movie, in Italian, complete with English subtitles and a projector that goes 'zzzzzzz."

After his marriage in 1965 and for the rest of the 1960s, Adolfas wrote and hustled his scripts to agents and producers while working as an editor and/or post-production coordinator on various independent films, including the soft-core films of Joe Sarno, ABC-TV's Wild World of Sports, and a few TV musicals. He was encouraged by Howard Hausman of the William Morris Agency, who had seen promise in Hallelujah the Hills and had made more than a few attempts at getting Mekas's scripts into the hands of independent producers who would understand their style. Although three of his screenplays remained under consideration at Warner Brothers for a few years, none were ever produced.

In 1967, with a very tight budget, Adolfas made a 16mm black-and-white film from his own script, Windflowers, Elegy for a Draft Dodger. Dominique Noguez in Cahiers du Cinéma wrote "....No frills, no Gipsy violin effects, no second movement of Aranjuez's concerto – and it is thereby, poignant. It is the other side of Vietnam. The stubbornness of a silent young man who is running away....who simply wanted to live."

Shortly after the completion of Windflowers, Adolfas was contacted by Governor Harold E. Hughes of Iowa and his staff. After an interview with the Governor, he was given the job of creating promotional commercials for Hughes's campaign for the United States Senate. He had no experience in the genre, but the challenge was enticing and he spent the summer of 1967 filming Hughes as he stumped the Iowa cornfields. He produced 35 TV commercials for Hughes's election campaign, which was ultimately successful.

In 1968 Mekas wrote, directed, and starred in a 3-minute short entitled Interview with the Ambassador from Lapland. It was photographed by Jonas, with assistance from Shirley Clarke on sound. It was produced by Pola Chapelle. Noguez wrote "In these 3 minutes Mekas is Swift, the horrible and admirable Swift of the 'Modest Proposal.' One really must admit that Mekas has made the USA a bit less loathsome." (Note that Jonas sometimes claimed authorship of this short film, calling it the Time Life Vietnam Newsreel.)

In 1969 Mekas photographed and edited Fishes in Screaming Water a catfilm produced by Pola Chapelle for the First International CatFilm Festival – INTERCAT '69 – which she founded. For the 2nd International Catfilm Festival in 1973, he made the award-winning How to Draw A Cat.

He edited and subtitled Companeras and Companeros in 1970. This was a feature documentary, shot in Cuba by David and Barbara Stone. He edited three versions, one for United States release, one for European release, and one for Cuban release. The same year he cut and edited a film by Yoko Ono, 360 legs, in "Up Your Leg."

In 1972, assisted by Pola Chapelle, Mekas completed an autobiographical film that documented his return to Lithuania after a 27-year absence. Going Home was invited to the New York Film Festival and many other festivals that year. It was part of the Conference on Visual Anthropology at Temple University in 1974 and was chosen by the Museum of Modern Art to be screened in its Anthropological Cinema exhibit, which toured internationally from 1975 to 1977.

== The Bard Years ==
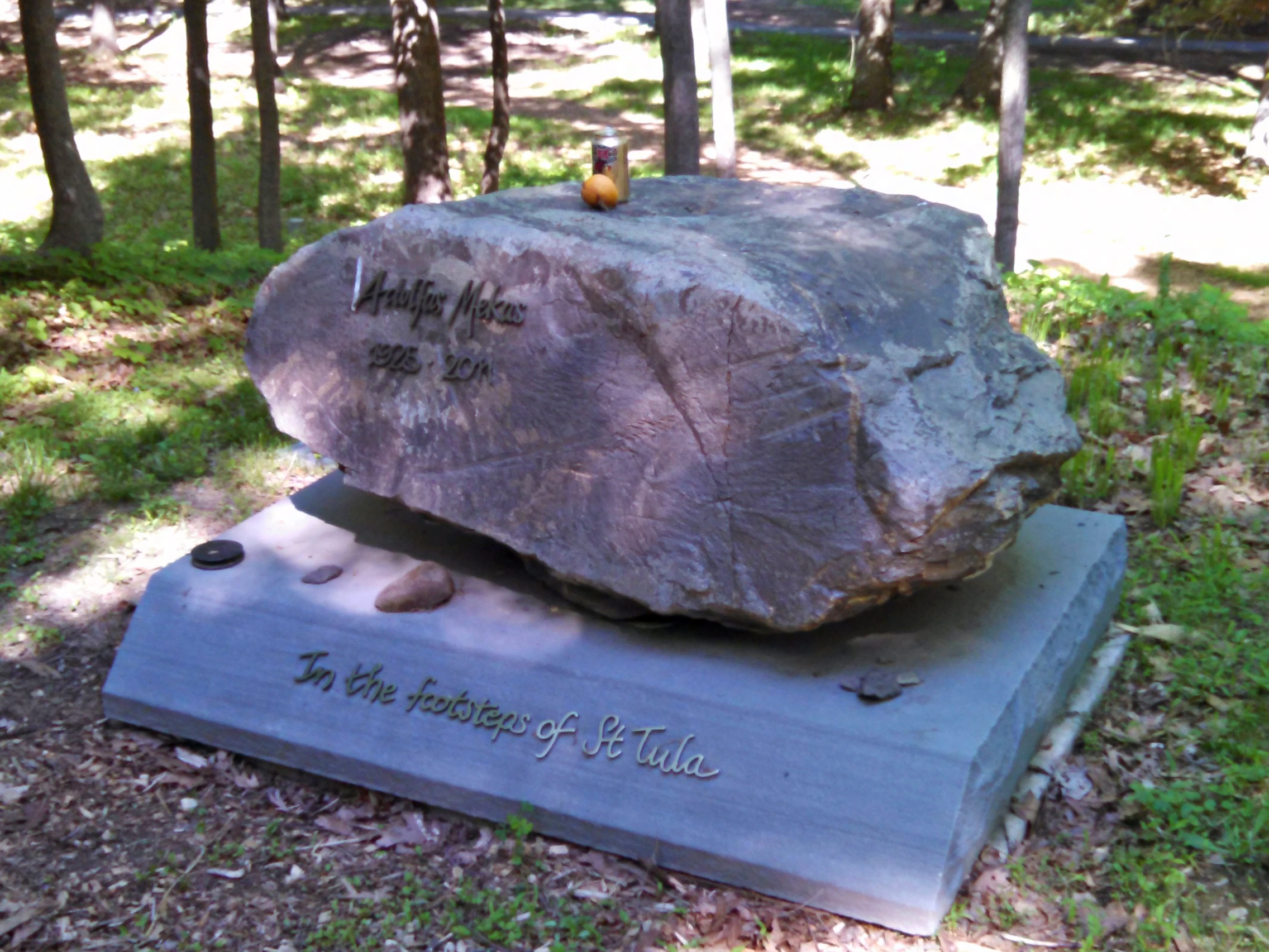
Grave of Adolfas Mekas at Bard College cemetery in Annandale-on-Hudson, New York

On 3 July 1971, Mekas received a teaching contract from Bard College. Soon after, he began organizing the new Film Department. At first denied tenure, he began a campaign believing that, if he were given tenure, the Film Department itself would be tenured. Armed with letters from colleagues in the film world and former students, he was successful, and in 1979 was granted tenure. Mekas, Chapelle, and their son Sean Mekas, an Upstate New York artist, moved to the Hudson Valley, where Adolfas dedicated himself to teaching. Adolph's, a nearby pub also known locally as "Down The Road", became their after hours seminar room.

Only a very small budget was available to the Film Department, and it continued as the "orphan in the storm" for many years. Mekas was not discouraged and rented a truck to visit film friends in New York City once a year with Pola. They looked in their friends' labs for reels, split reels, cores, viewers, projectors and occasionally a moviola, which they took back to the Bard College Film Center. The lack of proper funding of the department worked to energize Mekas and his students in innovative ways. For instance, to raise funds for senior projects in film he held lunchtime auctions outside the dining commons on campus. The film department was small - more than three graduates was rare in the early years – but it was active and visible. During his years as chairman, Adolfas brought to the Bard Film Department some of the most noted independent and experimental filmmakers, including, Bruce Baillie, Ernie Gehr, Andrew Noren, Barry Gerson, Peter Hutton and Peggy Ahwesh and film historians and theorists Paul Arthur, P. Adams Sitney. John Pruitt, and guest faculty – friends including Ken Jacobs, Sidney Peterson, Shirley Clarke and George Kuchar. The Bard Film Department grew in stature and became well-respected.

P. Adams Sitney writes, "what came to be known as the People's Film Department was [Mekas's] theater of hijinks; he surprised even himself with his enormous didactic gifts, his startling administrative skill and his unceasing fount of comic invention. His own fractured education and his nearly total disregard for academic decorum made him the ideal professor. Nowhere in the archive of film is there an invented character who could come near the brilliant, lovable, outrageous mischief that consistently turned his classrooms into arenas of magic. He taught generations how to see and act."

In the summer of 1971, while visiting Italy after his first trip back to the home he had left behind in Lithuania, Mekas had a vision of St. Tula. In Porto Santo Stefano, when he first saw her representation, it was clear that she was the Patron Saint of Cinema. He had no name for her at the time, but took a photo and displayed it in the Film Department. Shortly after, written under her photo in the Carriage House, was seen "St. Tula loves your film. Even if no one else does." The name stuck and an altar was built. Sometime later the "Sayings of St. Tula" was published.

In addition to chairing the Film Department and teaching film courses until 2004, in 1981 he co-founded the Milton Avery Graduate School of the Arts at Bard College and directed the MFA program from '83 to '89. He also taught film courses at the School of Visual Arts in New York City, and was a visiting lecturer at many institutions around the country.

Adolfas Mekas died in the early morning of 31 May 2011. By his bedside was his treatment for the fantasy docudrama he would make on the life and death by fire of the Neapolitan poet, philosopher, and so-called heretic Giordano Bruno. He called Bruno the first Beatnik.

== Partial filmography ==
- Lost, Lost, Lost (1950) with brother Jonas, unfinished
- Grand Street (1951) with brother Jonas, unfinished
- Silent Journey (1953) with brother Jonas, unfinished
- Antifilm #2 (1953)
- Inca (1954) lost
- Film Essay (1955) with brother Jonas, unfinished
- Sunday Junction (1958) with brother Jonas, unfinished
- Guns of the Trees (1961)
- Hallelujah The Hills (1963)
- Goldstein (1964) editor
- The Brig (1964)
- The Double Barreled Detective Story (1965)
- Skyscraper (1965)
- The Swap and How They Make It (1966) editor, post production coordinator & trailers ("hot" & "cool" versions)
- The Love Merchant (1966) editor
- Mimi Benzell (1966)
- Building for the Future (1966)
- A Matter of Baobab (1966)
- Step Out of Your Mind (1966) editor
- Windflowers – Elegy for a Draft Dodger (1967)
- Hawaii Ho! (1968) editor & post production coordinator
- Interview with the Ambassador from Lapland, Time-Life Newsreel (1967)
- Sweet Victory (1968)
- Fishes in Screaming Water (969) editor
- Companeros and Companeras (1970)
- A Matter of Baobab, First Growth (1970)
- Those Memory Years (1970) editor
- A Weekend With Strangers (1970) editor
- Up Your Leg (Yoko Ono in 1970) editor
- A Science Fiction Film in the Latter Twentieth Century (1971) production manager
- Going Home (1972)
- How to Draw a Cat (1973)

== Published works ==
- Mekas, Adolfas, and Jonas Mekas. Iš Pasaku Krašto: Rinktinės Ivairių tautų Pasakos. Vilnius: Dominicus Lituanus, 2013.
- "In August 2009..." 222 autobiographies de Robert Kaplan by his friends – page 469. Association Locus Solus, 2011
- Idylls of Šemeniskiai – Adolfas translated from Lithuanian to English this epic poem by Jonas. Hallelujah Editions 2007
- When the Turtles Collapse by Adolfas Mekas and Pola Chapelle, 1999 Hallelujah Editions 2005
- Nailing the Coffin, by Adolfas Mekas and Jonathan Shipman, 1981 Hallelujah Editions 2005
- The Father, the Son and a Holy Cow by Adolfas Mekas, 1999 Hallelujah Editions 2005
- Hallelujah les Collines (screenplay of "Hallelujah the Hills") L'Avant Scene, No. 64, 1966.
- "Soldiers Fought Bravely to Enter the city". (Short story) Bread&, No 2, 1962; Motive, Vol XXII, No. 3, 1962
- "A Letter From Mexico or a Film Between Two Mafias". Film Culture 20 (1959): 72–79. Print.
- "Chapter XV". (Excerpt from a novel.) Bread&, No 1, 1958.
- Proza II. Collected short stories. Gabija, 1951, in Lithuanian. (from 1945–52 published numerous literary and journalistic articles in various Lithuanian periodicals)
- Proza I. Collected short stories. Žvilgsniai, 1949, in Lithuanian.
- Une Reverence. Poems in prose. Žvilgsniai, 1948, in Lithuanian.
- Knyga Apie Karalius ir Žmones (A Book About Kings and People). Collected short stories. Patria, 1947, in Lithuanian; published again by Humanitas in 1994.
- Iš Svetimo Krašto (From a Foreign Country). Stories for children. Giedra, 1947, in Lithuanian.
- Trys Broliai (Three Brothers). Stories for children. Giedra, 1946, in Lithuanian.
