= Semeniškiai, Panevėžys =

Semeniškiai
- Village
- Location within Lithuania
- Coordinates: 56°9′29″N 24°56′49″E
- Country: Lithuania
- County: Panevėžys County
- Municipality: Biržai District Municipality

Population (2011)
  - Total: 3
- Time zone: UTC+2 (EET)
  - Summer (DST): UTC+3 (EEST)

Semeniškiai is a village in Panevėžys County, in northeastern Lithuania. According to the 2011 census, the village has a population of 3 people. Jonas Mekas, a Lithuanian American filmmaker, poet, and artist who has often been called "the godfather of American avant-garde cinema" was born in Semeniškiai in 1922. His work has been exhibited in museums and at festivals worldwide.
