= Eerik-Niiles Kross =

Estonian politician (born 1967)

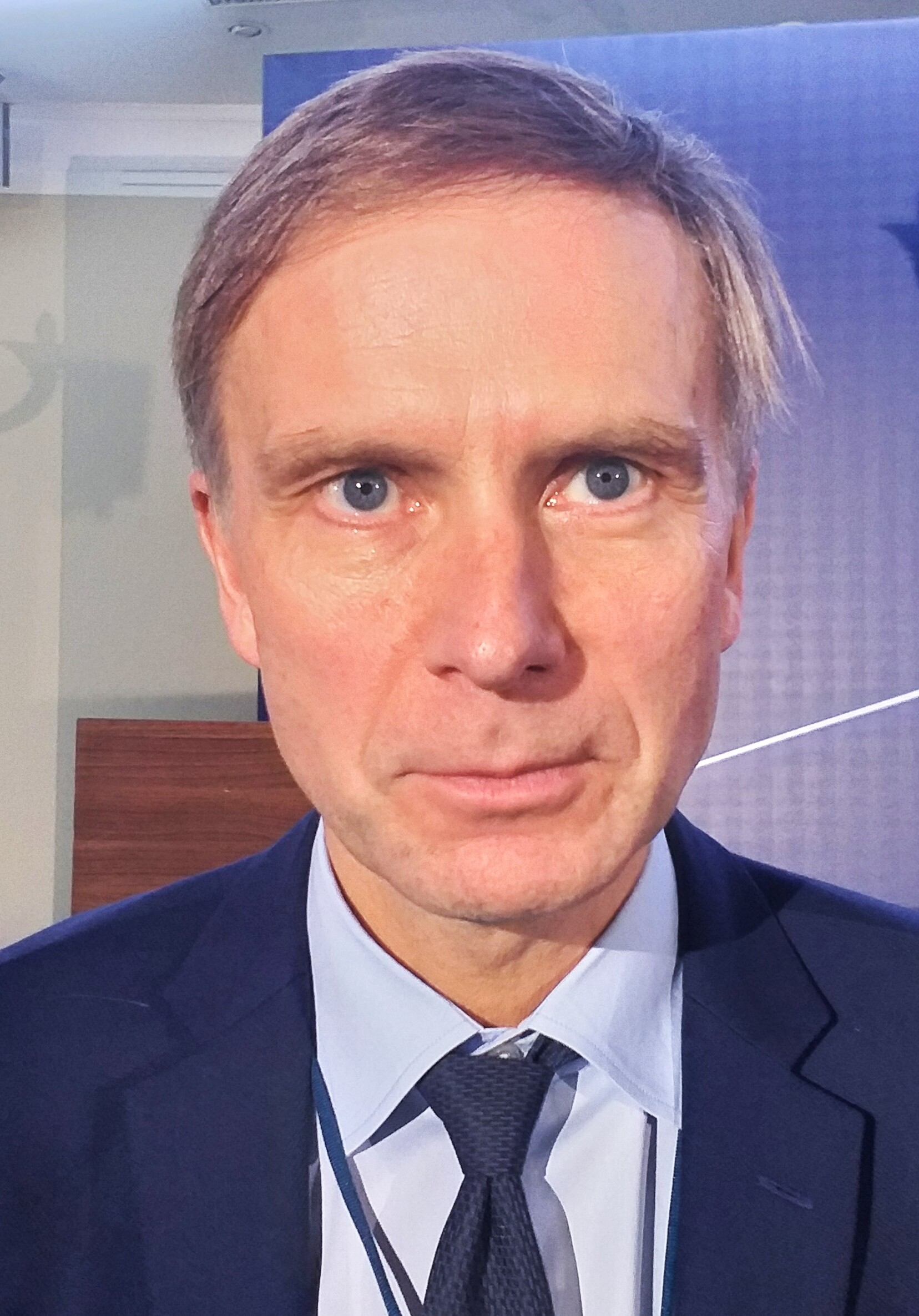
- Kross in 2024

Member of the Riigikogu
- Incumbent
- Assumed office 30 March 2015

Personal details
- Born: 8 September 1967 (age 59) Tallinn, then part of Estonian SSR, Soviet Union (Note: Estonia was occupied and de facto incorporated into the Soviet Union during 1940–1941 and 1944–1991, though this annexation was not legally recognised by most of the international community.)
- Party: Estonian Reform
- Spouse: Mary Jordan
- Parent(s): Jaan Kross; Ellen Niit

Eerik-Niiles Kross (born 8 September 1967) is an Estonian politician, diplomat, former chief of intelligence and entrepreneur. He is a member of parliament (Riigikogu). During the 1980s, Kross was a prominent figure in the anti-Soviet non-violent resistance movement in Soviet occupied Estonia. After re-independence, in 1991, he joined Estonia's Foreign Ministry. He served as the head of intelligence from 1995 to 2000; and as national security advisor to former President Lennart Meri in 2000 and 2001.

Kross represented Estonia as a diplomat in the UK, from 1990 to 1992; then in the US from 1992 to 1995.

Internationally, Kross is best known as a security expert, having worked in Iraq as a Senior Director of the Coalition Provisional Authority being responsible for creating the new Iraqi Ministry of Defense and Military Intelligence. He was an advisor to the Government of Georgia during and after its war with Russia in 2008. He coordinated the Georgian information campaign.

As an observer of foreign affairs, Kross has published more than 100 articles on Russian foreign policy, NATO and Estonian-Russian relations. Kross is a well known critic of the Russian foreign policy and the Russian head of state, Vladimir Putin.

In 2011, Russian authorities accused him of masterminding the 2009 hijacking of the MV Arctic Sea off the coast of Sweden. The Chairman of the Foreign Affairs Committee in Estonia, rejected this accusation as a fabrication by Russia's FSB.

Kross joined the moderate-conservative IRL in November 2011, and was elected to the Party Executive. He served on the Advisory Board to the Ministry of Defense. In October 2014 Kross left the IRL and joined the liberal democratic Estonian Reform Party. At the Parliamentary Elections of 2015 he ran at the Reform Party ticket in the Tallinn 3rd district and won a seat in Parliament after the MEP Urmas Paet did not accept his mandate.

Kross has published several books and written scripts for documentary films. He wrote the script for the 2006 documentary, The Blue Hills (Sinimäed), which received the Estonian Cultural Foundation's Film of the Year Award; also, special mention at the Tallinn Black Nights Film Festival.

Kross is married to the American filmmaker Mary Jordan.

== Education ==
Kross graduated from the University of Tartu in 1991 majoring in history. He also studied at the University of Hamburg, Germany. In 1993, Kross received an MA in History (Political and Social Change in Europe) at the University of London, United Kingdom (School of Slavonic and East European Studies). In 2000-2003 Kross studied at the University of Tartu's Institute of Law.

== Activities in independence movement of Estonia ==
In Soviet occupied Estonia Kross was actively involved in the independence movement. In April 1988, he was one of a three-member group (along with Margus Kasterpalu and Tiit Pruuli) that brought out the banned national flag (blue-black-white). In June 1988, Kross was one of organizers of the First Youth Forum gathering all pro-independence youth organizations of the country. Kross was also one of ideologues of re-establishing of Soviet-banned Estonian academic student organizations. On 1 December 1988 the Estonian Students' Society (EÜS) was reestablished under his leadership. Kross was the first post-war chairman of the Estonian Students Society.

In 1990-91 Kross represented the Estonian independence movement in the United Kingdom running the so-called Estonian Information Bureau in London.

== Activities in foreign representations of Estonia ==
Eerik-Niiles Kross re-established the Estonian Embassy in the UK. He was the first representative (chargé d'affaires) of the restored Republic of Estonia in London, becoming the youngest representative of a foreign government in the history of the London Diplomatic Corps. In 1992 Kross worked as a minister-counselor at Estonian Mission to the UN in New York. In November 1992, Kross took over the representation of Republic of Estonia in United States of America from Ambassador Ernst Jaakson who had maintained Estonia's legal continuity from before World War II; Kross was chargé d'affaires of Estonian Republic until arrival of Ambassador Toomas Hendrik Ilves in summer of 1993. During 1993–1995, Kross worked at the Embassy of Estonia, Washington, D.C. as the Deputy Chief of Mission.

== Activities as Director of Security Coordination of Estonia ==
From 1995 to 2000, Eerik-Niiles Kross was the Intelligence Coordinator of Government of Estonia. In 2000-2001 he was the National Security Adviser to the Estonian president Lennart Meri. Kross was responsible for the security parts of Estonia's Membership Action Plan for Estonia to join NATO. In 2008 the President of Estonia awarded him the Order of the White Star III class for his "contribution to joining NATO".

== Activities in foreign missions in Iraq and Georgia ==
In 2003-2004 Kross worked as Senior Director for Intelligence Institutions Development in the team of Paul Bremer, the Head of the Coalition Provisional Authority in Iraq. He was responsible for the establishment of the new Defense Ministry of Iraq and the military intelligence among other duties. Later Kross worked at the Defense Ministry of Iraq as a senior advisor.

Since 2007 Kross has advised the Government of Georgia and President Mikheil Saakashvili in the field of foreign and media relations as well as security related issues. During the Russian-Georgian War in 2008, Kross led the team of foreign advisors of Georgian government in the field of media and information operations.

== Bronze Soldier ==
In 2007, during the "Bronze Soldier" controversy Kross was a member of the Estonian Government's War Graves Commission. He was appointed by the Defense Minister Jürgen Ligi. The commission had 6 members, each of the members had been appointed by a Government minister. The commission gave the recommendation to the Government to remove a Soviet War Monument ("Bronze Soldier") from central Tallinn to a military cemetery. The monument was removed in late April. The so-called Bronze Night riots of the Russian-speaking youth occurred as a reaction.

== INTERPOL red notice ==
On 18 October 2013, on request by the Russian Federation, The International Criminal Police Organization or INTERPOL published on its website a "wanted" request for Kross on charges of organizing piracy, related to the hijacking of the Finnish-owned MV Arctic Sea in the Baltic in 2009. This happened two days before the Estonian local elections finale on 20 October 2013. During these elections Kross ran as a candidate for mayor for the capital city Tallinn, which led to claims by Estonian officials of a Russian effort to sabotage the elections. On 22 October the Minister of the Interior of Estonia Ken-Marti Vaher said that Estonia will protest the Russian request and will point out to Interpol that it is in violation of the Interpol Constitution to mediate politically motivated cases. James Kirchick, a Washington-based analyst commented on the incident in EU Observer: "Such low tactics are characteristic of Russian interference in its 'sphere of privileged interests,' that is, the independent countries of the former Soviet space which the Kremlin considers to be its imperial playground."

== Political activity ==
During the Parliamentary elections of 2011, Kross ran for a seat in Parliament on the list of Estonian Greens candidates as number one in Pärnumaa, and number two on the all-state list of the party. He received 3579 votes – the biggest number of votes in the entire list of Estonian Greens candidates - 8,8% of all votes in his electoral district, but did not make it to the Parliament. On 5 December 2011 Kross joined the liberal conservative Pro Patria and Res Publica Union (IRL). In January 2012 the IRL Congress elected Kross to the Executive Board of the party. He is also a member of the IRL Tallinn region board and IRL Assembly.

At the local elections of 2013 Kross was the mayor's candidate for the capital Tallinn for IRL. He ran an aggressive campaign and raised the popularity of IRL in the capital from 5% in May to 20% in October. Kross received 6897 votes - the biggest number of votes for a newcomer at local elections in Estonian history - 26.4% of all votes in his electoral district. Edgar Savisaar's Center Party won the elections, Kross became a member of the City Council and the leader of the opposition in Tallinn.

In October 2014 Kross left the IRL and joined the liberal democratic Estonian Reform Party.

During the Parliamentary Elections of 2015 he ran on the Reform Party ticket in the Tallinn 3rd district and won a seat in Parliament after the MEP Urmas Paet did not accept his mandate.

In addition to his role in parliament, Kross has been serving as member of the Estonian delegation to the Parliamentary Assembly of the Council of Europe since 2015. As member of the Estonian Reform Party, he is part of the Alliance of Liberals and Democrats for Europe group. In 2015-2018 he was a member of the Committee on the Honouring of Obligations and Commitments by Member States of the Council of Europe (Monitoring Committee) and the Committee on Migration, Refugees and Displaced Persons. He was also a member of a cross-party delegation to observe the 2017 presidential elections in Serbia. Currently he is the head of the Estonian Delegation to PACE and Vice President of the Monitoring Committee.

== Other activities ==
In 2007 it was reported that Kross and his business partner Heiti Hääl had purchased the remains of the Baltic Exchange building from the UK and wished to re-erect the historical building in Tallinn, Estonia. They planned to deliver the building from London in parts. It was later reported the National Heritage Board of Estonia did not approve the planned location near Tallinn Old Town.

Kross is one of the founders of the Estonian Reserve Officers' association and currently a member of the Court of Honour of the Estonian Reserve Officers' Association.

In 2011 the Estonian media reported that Kross is reconstructing Kõue Manor, a national heritage site near Tallinn. The manor was first mentioned in 1379 and was once owned by the world-famous explorer Otto von Kotzebue. Kross is planning to open an Arts Center in the manor.

The Estonian Chamber of Commerce and Industry awarded Kross' consultancy company Trustcorp "The Most Competitive Service Enterprise 2012" award in October 2012.

On 11 November 2012 Kross was elected the President of the Estonian Judo Association.

== Bibliography ==
- Estonians! / Photography: Jüri Soomägi; Text Eerik-Niiles Kross. Göteborg : Ekstrand & Blennow AB, 1989. ISBN 91-85786-49-7
- Eerik-Niiles Kross. Pro Patria. II. Auraamat langenud ja hukkunud metsavendadele 1944-1978 Okupatsioonide Repressiivpoliitika Uurimise Riiklik Komisjon. Tartu 1998. ISBN 9985-9178-2-0
- Eerik-Niiles Kross. Vabaduse väravad : valik tekste 1988–2006. (Selected essays) Tartu : Ilmamaa, 2007. 422 pages. ISBN 978-9985-77-217-1
- Nation building and the idea of Iraq, Diplomaatia, March/April 2005. Eesti välispoliitika ajakiri
- Lisbon NATO Summit and Russia: Crown Jewels for Chicken Feed? Eurasia Daily Monitor Volume: 7 Issue: 211, 19 November 2010
- Kross. Üksikud head mehed. Kaur Kender, Jaan Kross, Eerik-Niiles Kross. Tallinn 2011. ISBN 978-9949216468
- Putin’s war of smoke and mirrors Politico, 4 September 2016
- Eerik-Niiles Kross THE BALTIC JAMES BOND, Politico 28-list, 2017
