= MV Arctic Sea =

Ship

Coordinates: 48°57′06″N 5°39′19″W

- Outline of the Arctic Sea

History
- Name: 1991: Okhotskoye; 1996: Zim Venezuela; 1998: Alrai; 1998: Torm Senegal; 2000: Jogaila; 2005: Arctic Sea; 2017: Shelly Express; 2018: L.T.W. Express; 2020: Baby Leen
- Owner: Arctic Runner Shipping Inc.
- Operator: Great Lakes Feeder Lines
- Port of registry: 1991: Soviet Union; 1992: Malta; 1998: Jamaica; 1998: Lithuania; 2005: Malta; 2010: Barbados; 2020: Panama
- Builder: Sedef Shipyard, Istanbul, Turkey
- Yard number: 84
- Launched: 22 March 1991
- Christened: 1997
- Completed: 1992
- Identification: IMO number: 8912792
- Fate: Decommissioned
- Status: In Alang, India to be scrapped

General characteristics
- Tonnage: 3,988 GT; 4,706 DWT; 1,618 NT
- Length: 97.80 m (320 ft 10 in)
- Beam: 17.33 m (56 ft 10 in)
- Height: 38.0 m (124 ft 8 in) (from keel)
- Draught: 6.01 m (19 ft 9 in) (summer)
- Depth: 7.01 m (23 ft 0 in)
- Ice class: 1A
- Installed power: 3,400 kW (4,560 hp)
- Propulsion: 1 diesel engine
- Speed: 12.50 knots (23.15 km/h; 14.38 mph)
- Crew: 15

MV Arctic Sea is a cargo ship formerly registered in Malta that was reported missing between late July and mid-August 2009 en route from Finland to Algeria, crewed by Russian sailors and declared to be carrying a cargo of timber. Hijackers allegedly boarded the ship off the coast of Sweden on 24 July 2009. The incident was not immediately reported, and contact with the ship was lost on or after 30 July. The Arctic Sea did not arrive at its scheduled port in Algeria and was reportedly located near Cape Verde instead on 14 August. On 17 August, it was seized by the Russian Navy. An investigation into the incident was started amidst speculation regarding the ship's actual cargo, and there were allegations of a cover-up by Russian authorities. The Arctic Sea was towed into harbor in the Maltese capital of Valletta on 29 October 2009.

The ship's alleged hijacking and subsequent events have remained difficult to understand, as no credible explanation has been presented of its disappearance and Russian authorities' conduct during and after the ship's capture. If confirmed to be an act of piracy, the hijacking of Arctic Sea would be the first known of its kind in Northern European waters for centuries.

The Russian court found all of the alleged hijackers to be guilty of piracy, but this has not led commentators to be any "closer to knowing what actually happened".

== Background ==
In March 2010, the Arctic Sea was owned by a U.S.-based company, Arctic Runner Shipping Inc., and operated by a Canada-based company, Great Lakes Feeder Lines. At the time of the hijacking the vessel was owned by a Finnish company and operated by Solchart Management.

== Boarding incident ==
The ship was crewed by complement of 15 Russian sailors and was declared to be carrying more than $1.8 million worth of timber from Jakobstad, Finland, to Béjaïa, Algeria. The 6,700 cubic meters of sawn timber was sold by Rets Timber, a joint venture between Stora Enso Oyj and UPM-Kymmene Oyj. The ship was between the islands of Öland and Gotland in the territorial waters of Sweden when it was allegedly boarded in the early hours of 24 July 2009 by a group of eight to ten English-speaking men. They approached on an inflatable boat bearing the word "polis" (Swedish for "police"). The ship's owner learned from the captain that the intruders claimed to be police officers, apprehended the crew, searched the ship, and then left, leaving some crew members injured. The Swedish government said that its police forces were not involved in boarding the vessel, and they then launched an investigation.

A spokesman for the European Commission said that the actions had nothing "in common with traditional acts of piracy or armed robbery at sea".

=== Disappearance ===
Route of the Arctic Sea

The British Maritime and Coastguard Agency had the last known radio contact with the vessel as it was passing through the Strait of Dover on 28 July. Nothing extraordinary was detected during the communication, though authorities believe that the crew was coerced not to raise an alarm by the hijackers. The ship continued to send Automatic Identification System signals until 30 July. A press-secretary of the Swedish Police Authority confirmed that one of its investigators had a phone contact with a crew member on 31 July, but refused to disclose its nature. No communication occurred after that; the ship failed to come to Béjaïa on its scheduled arrival date, 5 August. Coastal tracking radar last picked up the ship's signal near Brest, France; it was later reported being observed by a patrol aircraft near the Portuguese coast. The vessel was never seen passing through the Strait of Gibraltar. A hijack alert was issued by Interpol on 3 August.

The Russian Navy dispatched ships from its Black Sea Fleet to search for the vessel and Portugal also conducted a search.

=== Discovery ===
On 14 August the ship was reportedly sighted off Cape Verde. The Russian ambassador to Cape Verde stated that a Russian frigate was heading to the area but that the detection had not been confirmed. Meanwhile, an unnamed military official stated that the ship had indeed been found but that the location was being kept secret from the public for security reasons, without clarifying the statement further.

The Defense Minister of Russia, Anatoliy Serdyukov, announced on 17 August that the ship had been found and seized off the Cape Verde Islands. All 15 crew members were said to be alive and well; they were transferred to the Ladnyy, a Krivak-class frigate, for questioning. At that time no additional details were given. Dmitry Rogozin, Russia's ambassador to NATO, mentioned to the press on 17 August that false information was deliberately supplied to the media in order to keep Russian plans secret.

After the ship's seizure the Malta Maritime Authority stated that the security committee—composed of Maltese, Finnish and Swedish authorities—were aware of the ship's location at all times, but withheld the information to protect the crew.

=== Seizure and investigation ===
On 15 August the Finnish Police issued a statement about their investigation, in cooperation with Swedish and Maltese authorities, into "aggravated extortion and alleged hijacking". The police confirmed that a ransom had been demanded, but did not reveal any details, citing possible threats to life and safety. The ship's owners claimed that they had not received any ransom demands. The security chief of Russian insurance agency Renaissance Insurance Group told Russian newspapers on 18 August that their office was telephoned on 3 August, and the caller claimed to be speaking on behalf of the hijackers, demanding €1.5 million or else the ship would be sunk and crew killed.

On 18 August, the Russian defense minister stated that eight hijackers had been arrested. Names of the suspects were later released (on 25 August). According to the Russian defense minister, four of the arrested men held Estonian passports, two were Latvian, and the other two were Russian citizens. The Estonian Security Police reported on 20 August that six of the eight alleged hijackers were residents of Estonia, and of these, one had Estonian citizenship, two were Russian citizens, and three had undefined citizenship; additionally, several of them were known to have a prior criminal background. Once it became known that most of the alleged hijackers were residents of Estonia, the country joined the international investigation group already consisting of Finland, Sweden, and Malta.

Ships sailing the high seas are generally under the jurisdiction of the flag state (in case of the Arctic Sea, Malta). However, according to the United Nations Convention on the Law of the Sea, piracy is a universal jurisdiction crime so that persons arrested for piracy while in international waters are tried according to the laws of the arresting country: Russia, in this case.

According to the Russian defense minister, the hijackers approached the ship on 24 July on an inflatable boat with a purported engine problem, and were thus taken aboard by the crew. The alleged hijackers denied that any hijacking attempt took place, claiming to be environmentalists who were picked up by the ship after their boat had run out of fuel. Eleven crew members (the captain and several others remained on the ship) were returned to Moscow and held in isolation as witnesses that, quoting Alexander Bastrykin, First Deputy Prosecutor General of Russia, "need[ed] to be immediately interrogated." The Finnish National Bureau of Investigation was not supplied any information on why the crew was being held, and if they were suspected of any wrongdoing. The Russian Foreign Ministry announced that, when captured by the Russian warship, the captain initially claimed that the ship was North Korean, which was subsequently denied by Pyongyang. An attorney representing one of the alleged hijackers stated that it was the captain of the ship who prevented the men (purportedly stranded environmentalists) from disembarking the ship and who actually directed her towards the western coast of Africa. Nine of the eleven detained crew members returned home to Arkhangelsk on 29 August; the remaining two ostensibly were released at a later date. In the meantime, the investigating authorities have placed a gag order on the crew, with a penalty of up to 7 years in prison.

An initial search of the ship found no suspicious cargo, according to the Russian Foreign Ministry. Russian Foreign Minister Sergey Lavrov made a statement on 8 September, saying that nothing suspicious had been found on the Arctic Sea and that Maltese officials would be invited to take part in an inspection of the ship. The Times of Malta reported on 11 September that Maltese police officers and officials had been allowed to enter the ship.

== Conclusion of vessel-related events ==
On 29 October 2009 the Russian Navy finally delivered the Arctic Sea to Malta where, after an inspection by Maltese authorities, it was allowed to enter harbour and was returned to its owner. The four crew members, including the vessel's master, who had remained with the vessel after its seizure by the Russian Navy off the Cape Verde Islands, returned to Russia. Solchart flew a new crew into Valletta. Repairs were made during the week of 3 November and then the ship finally delivered its cargo of sawn lumber to Algeria. In March 2011 6 of the 8 alleged hijackers were sentenced to jail terms ranging from 7 to 12 years. One of the convicted men, Yevgeny Mironov, was sentenced to seven years of hard labor.

=== Media coverage and speculation ===
Doubts have been raised by various sources regarding the Russian authorities' account of hijacking circumstances and events, as well as the nature of the ship's cargo. Unusual aspects of the hijacking of the Arctic Sea have been pointed out by the European Union Commission and the media. This has led to speculation on the nature of the operation.

A rapporteur on piracy for the Assembly of the Western European Union and former commander of the Estonian Defence Forces Tarmo Kõuts was quoted in the Estonian newspaper Postimees as saying, "Only the presence of cruise missiles on board the ship can explain Russia's strange behavior in this whole story." He noted that the size of the naval unit sent out after MV Arctic Sea was larger than that dispatched to deal with the Somali piracy crisis. According to a widely circulated theory, the ship was transporting anti-aircraft weapons and cruise missiles destined for Iran, and the "hijackers" were gangsters hired by the Israeli intelligence service Mossad to prevent the cargo from reaching its destination. Referring to an earlier article in Russia's Komsomolskaya Pravda, The Independent reported that an unnamed general in the Russian Navy spoke of his suspicion that Russian organized crime was illegally shipping S-300 or Kh-55 missiles to Iran. A variation of the story suggested that the Russian government itself had staged the hijacking of the ship once it learned about an unsanctioned missile delivery to the Middle East. Specifically, Mossad was reported to have been tracking the shipment, and, as BBC News reported, informed Russian authorities that the ship was transporting a "Russian air defence system for Iran." The S-300 missiles allegedly were loaded on board when the ship stopped in Kaliningrad.

Other speculation links the hijacking with Syria's aim to purchase MiG-31 jetfighters, which were actually officially ordered in 2007. The order was suspended in May 2009, reportedly either due to Israeli pressure or lack of Syrian funds. However, Russian media reported in September 2009 that Russia intends to deliver those jetfighters. This context speculation that the Arctic Sea could have been carrying up to four MiG-31 hulls for Syria.

The nature of the cargo was initially questioned by Alexander Bastrykin, leader of the Russian investigative team. He stated that he would "not rule out the possibility that [Arctic Sea] might have been carrying not only timber."

On 3 September 2009, it was reported that Russian journalist Mikhail Voitenko had quit his job and fled Russia allegedly after receiving threats regarding his reporting. Before his flight, Mr. Voitenko was the editor-in-chief of the Sovfrakht Marine Bulletin, which first reported the Arctic Sea missing and questioned the official story released by Russian authorities.

Finnish authorities dismissed the possibility that the Arctic Sea was bearing a cargo of nuclear material. Jukka Laaksonen, head of the Finnish Radiation and Nuclear Safety Authority, said radiation tests had been conducted on the ship at a port in Finland before it began its voyage. He also dismissed as "stupid rumours" reports in British and Finnish newspapers that the ship could be carrying a nuclear cargo that could explain its disappearance and the purported hijacking.

Dmitry Rogozin was quoted by Interfax news agency as saying, "Instead of speculating about the nature of the cargo carried on the Arctic Sea and inventing different types of tales ... important lessons should be drawn from this event. ... Instead of wagging their tongues in speculation, European officials should think about the need to tackle this threat of piracy." Sergey Lavrov stated that the Arctic Sea was not secretly carrying advanced Russian missiles, "As for the alleged presence of S-300 systems on board the dry cargo carrier Arctic Sea, this is an absolute lie"; the Russian Prosecutor General's office also denied the presence of anything but timber aboard the ship. Critical of the idea of Iran-bound missiles aboard the Arctic Sea, Russian journalist Maxim Kononenko pointed out that Russia has direct access to Iran through the Caspian Sea. However, Russia deployed two Ilyushin Il-76 transporter planes with a load capacity of at least 45 tons each to Amílcar Cabral International Airport in Cape Verde, which prompts the question whether there was more payload than the 14 crew members and 8 suspects to be taken home. Sal International Airport has a long history as a strategic refueling location for Russian and former Soviet Bloc aircraft flying to and from Latin America and the Caribbean. Speculations say the vessel may have been under Russian control already in an early stage of the incident and rerouted intentionally to thinly populated Cape Verde, where the illegal payload could be secretly unloaded and be brought back to Russia with the local government's support.

In November 2010, the diplomatic cables leak revived the discussion for a period of time, when a senior Spanish prosecutor described "the strange case of the Arctic Sea ship in mid-2009 as 'a clear example' of arms trafficking."

=== Trial ===
As of 24 December 2010, six of the nine accused had pleaded guilty. One of them, Andrei Lunev, a Russian citizen, was believed to have made a plea bargain with the Russian prosecution service. He was tried with no contest and was sentenced to 5 years imprisonment on 7 May 2010. According to the Criminal Code of Russia such an offence is punishable by 5 to 10 years imprisonment, but the maximum term is increased to 15 years if an act of piracy is performed by an organised group.

Dmitry Savins, a citizen of Latvia who earlier pleaded guilty to Russian Prosecution Service, was sentenced to 7 years imprisonment on 11 June 2010. The Russian Prosecution service named Dmitry Savins as a leader of the hijack group. In his testimony, Savins named an Estonian businessman, diplomat and a former chief of the Estonian intelligence service Eerik-Niiles Kross as a mastermind of the operation. A German and an Israeli businessmen were named as related to the crime as well, although no evidence of that was disclosed.

On 3 December 2010, Russian court sentenced Sergei Demchenko, a Latvian businessman, to three years of imprisonment. He had earlier made a plea bargain with Russian Prosecution Service and the trial was with no contest. Amongst those publicly known to be arrested in relation to the hijack, Demchenko appears to be the only person who was not a member of the boarding group. Circumstances around Demchenko's trial have remained vague. Even the fact that he had allegedly been arrested was first reported by media on 1 December, yet as late as on 3 December 2010 it was not known to media when and where Russian police had detained him.

One of the six remaining accused requested a jury trial. This move caused some legal complications, as all the remaining accused had then to be tried by jury as a group. The case was assigned to Arkhangelsk Oblast Court (Arkhangelsk was considered the official place of residence for Arctic Sea crew) and the preliminary hearing was due to take place on 16 December 2010. In accordance with Russian law, earlier testimonies given by Savins et al. as part of a plea bargain would not have been admissible then in jury trial.

During the preliminary hearing it was revealed that the accused who had chosen a jury trial had reportedly changed their minds; therefore the outcome of the case remained subsequently to be decided by judges alone. On 24 March 2011, the court returned its verdict on the remaining accused and "the men – a Russian, a Latvian and an Estonian citizen, as well as three others described as stateless – were given sentences ranging from 7 to 12 years."

In October 2025, Alex Brodsky, formerly known as Alexey Kertsgur, was arrested in Cyprus under a Russian extradition request alleging his involvement in planning the 2009 seizure of the Arctic Sea. The Larnaca District Court approved his extradition to Russia on 25 February 2026.

On 6 October 2026, the Supreme Court of Cyprus rejected his application for habeas corpus, leaving the extradition order in force and ordering that he remain in custody pending extradition. The court held that he had not demonstrated that his detention was unlawful or that extradition to Russia would be unjust or oppressive. The proceedings concerned the legality of his detention and extradition rather than determining his guilt in the alleged 2009 offences.
