= AA9 =

AA-9 or AA9 may refer to:

- Vympel R-33, a Soviet long-range air-to-air missile whose NATO reporting name is the AA-9 'Amos'
- A hieroglyph (𓐗) (Gardiner's designated symbol AA9)
