= Triigi, Harju County =

Village in Estonia

Coordinates: 59°05′55″N 25°14′31″E

Triigi
- Village
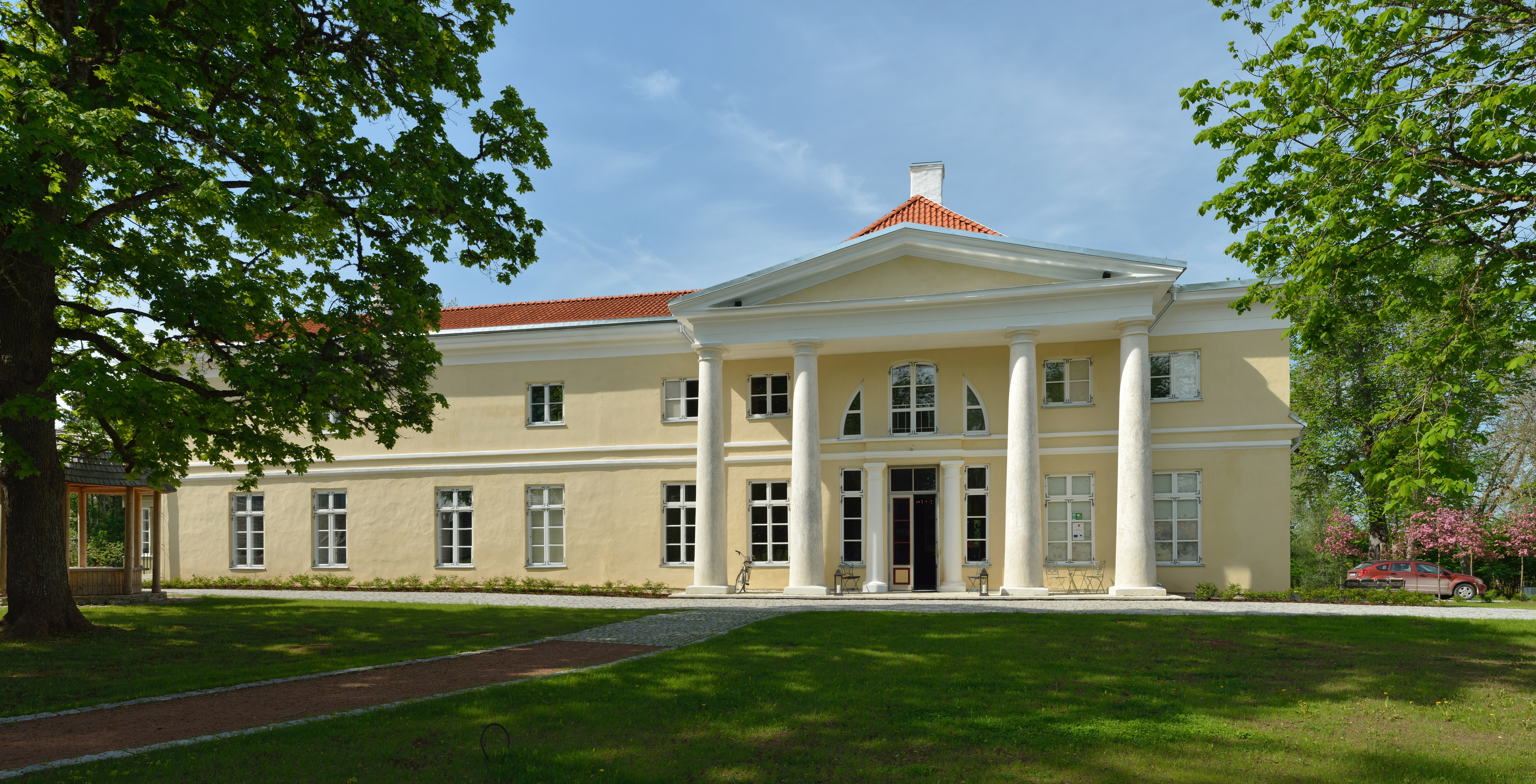
- Kõue-Triigi manor
- Interactive map of Triigi
- Country: Estonia
- County: Harju County
- Municipality: Kose Parish
- Time zone: UTC+2 (EET)
  - Summer (DST): UTC+3 (EEST)

Triigi is a village in Kose Parish, Harju County in northern Estonia. It was a part of Kõue Parish before 2013.

It is the location of Kõue Manor (Triigi Manor; Kau).
