= Mary Jordan (filmmaker) =

Mary Jordan is a Canadian-American filmmaker and activist.

== Career ==
=== Filmography ===
In 2005, Filmmaker magazine named Jordan one of the top 25 New Faces of Independent Film.

Jordan's first feature-length film was Jack Smith and the Destruction of Atlantis, which was named one of the top movies of 2007 by Entertainment Weekly. It later received the Tribeca Film Festival Jury Award, the Best Documentary Award from the Torino Film Festival, and the Jury Award at Dok Leipzig.

=== Philanthropy ===
Jordan is the Founder of Word Above the Street, a non-profit organization that fosters environmental awareness, education, and social advocacy through large-scale public art projects. In 2011 the Ford Foundation awarded Word Above the Street a grant to develop the Water Tank Project.

=== Notable speaking engagements ===
Jordan has spoken on topics such as film and water at The Water Tank Project in Venice (October 2012), Social Gold Summit (September 2013), TEDxTallinn (May 2014), and the French Institute Alliance Francasie (January 2020)

== Controversy ==
In November 2018, Jordan filed a report to the Estonian police about a xenophobic attack against her in the Estonian capital Tallinn. Jordan said one of the attackers wore a badge of the right-radical political party EKRE. The police later issued a statement that they were unable to verify the report and started an investigation into Jordan instead. In the course of the criminal proceedings, it was confirmed that Jordan had knowingly given false testimony to the police on several occasions as a victim during the interrogation. Jordan was charged with making false statements. In October 2019 The Harju District Court ended the case against Jordan upon the request of the Prosecutor without charges. EKRE Chairman and Minister of Interior Mart Helme called the court ruling "absurd" and said the prosecution's motives to end the case look "politically motivated". Jordan issued a statement re-confirming that the attack against her had taken place, that she finds it shameful that the case turned into "media circus" instead of finding the culprits but she prefers not to spend more time on this and considers the case closed. She was fined €3000 for making false statements.

== Personal life ==
As of 2019, Jordan is married to Estonian MP Eerik-Niiles Kross.
