= Jack Smith and the Destruction of Atlantis =

- Directed by: Mary Jordan
- Written by: Mary Jordan
- Produced by: Mary Jordan; Kenneth Wayne Peralta
- Starring: John Waters; Mary Sue Slater; Richard Foreman; Mario Montez; Gary Indiana; Jonas Mekas; Sylvère Lotringer; Thomas Lanigan-Schmidt; Uzi Parnes; John Zorn
- Distributed by: Tongue Press; Monk Media
- Release dates: April 26, 2006 (Tribeca Film Festival); April 11, 2007 (United States)
- Running time: 94 minutes
- Country: United States
- Language: English

Jack Smith and the Destruction of Atlantis is a documentary film that premiered in the 2006 Tribeca Film Festival. It is a collection of interviews and clips by and about the artist Jack Smith. It was directed by Mary Jordan and produced by Tongue Press Productions.

The film was given a limited release in New York movie theaters beginning on April 11, 2007.

Jordan is a Canadian-born filmmaker known for her documentary shorts resulting from extended visits to Africa and Southeast Asia. David Ebony, whose review of the film appeared in Art in America, had met Smith in the late 70s soon after moving to New York and at that time "attempted to assist him with a number of 'slide-show performances.'" Ebony's review, following the documentary, covers some of the difficult exhibition history of Flaming Creatures (1963), Smith's best known film, and difficult collaborations with Jonas Mekas and Andy Warhol and others. Voiceovers from Smith, culled from some 14 hours of interviews with various critics and friends, supplemented the archival visual materials, footage and extensive interviews with filmmaker John Waters, Smith's sister Mary Sue Slater, playwright Richard Foreman, Smith and Warhol star Mario Montez, writer Gary Indiana, and musician John Zorn, among others. Ebony concludes that the film "manages to evoke the quirky and often cantankerous personality of its subject without ever making him seem merely a disgruntled artist and social misfit, as some may think him. ... I feel that Jordan's multifaceted and impassioned portrait rings true. Smith, in fact, comes off in the film as an ingenious art-world Cassandra, more relevant today than ever."

Wesley Morris, whose review appeared in the Boston Globe, was impressed that Jordan "manages to conjure Smith's story while also telling a story about art in America", concluding that Smith was "a pioneer of the sort of event that just doesn't seem possible in an age when counterculture feels like mass culture and very little art is shocking".
