= Thomas Lanigan-Schmidt =

American artist (born 1948)

- Born: 1948 (age 77–78); Elizabeth, New Jersey, United States
- Known for: Collage, Mixed Media

Thomas Lanigan-Schmidt (born 1948) is an American artist who took part in the 1969 Stonewall uprising in New York City, which was a historic turning point in the movement for Gay liberation and LGBT rights. He is on the faculty of New York City's School of Visual Arts.

Lanigan-Schmidt's artwork incorporates materials such as tinsel, foil, cellophane, saran wrap and glitter, embracing kitsch and the intentionally tacky.

== Early years and Stonewall uprising ==
Born in 1948 in Elizabeth, New Jersey, Thomas Lanigan-Schmidt spent most of his childhood in nearby Linden. As a child in 1950s Linden, after Lanigan-Schmidt was assigned to decorate the school bulletin board in his Catholic elementary school, he built a detailed model of a church altar. The impressive model was featured in a local paper while Lanigan-Schmidt was a student at St. Elizabeth School.

In the early 1960s he worked at "odd jobs to help support his family and was bullied by high school thugs." He moved to New York City as a young man and attended Pratt Institute in 1965–66. He applied to, but was rejected by Cooper Union. He later attended the School of Visual Arts.

In the 1960s and '70s Lanigan-Schmidt was an associate of the underground filmmaker Jack Smith. He participated in at least one of Smith's performances, "Withdrawal from Orchid Lagoon", and was interviewed in the documentary Jack Smith and the Destruction of Atlantis. Another member of Lanigan-Schmidt's circle was Charles Ludlam.

Lanigan-Schmidt, who is openly gay, was present at the Stonewall riots in June 1969 when patrons of a gay bar in New York City's Greenwich Village spontaneously fought back against a violent police raid; the uprising became a turning point in the fight for LGBT rights in the United States. Shortly after the riot started, he was photographed by freelance photographer Fred W. McDarrah. He is one of the few recognized Stonewall veterans still living.

Lanigan-Schmidt appears in the 1995 film, Stonewall, in a documentary segment. An installation art piece by Lanigan-Schmidt, Mother Stonewall and the Golden Rats, commemorated the events at the Stonewall Inn.

He also appeared in the 2012 Documentary 'Pay It No Mind - The Life and Times of Marsha P Johnson' Directed by Michael Kasino, where Lanigan-Schmidt was quoted as saying "History isn't something you look back at and say it was inevitable, it happens because people make decisions that are sometimes very impulsive and of the moment, but those moments are cumulative realities."

In recognition of the 40th anniversary of the Stonewall riots, Lanigan-Schmidt was among those invited to the White House to meet with Michelle and Barack Obama.

== Artwork ==
Lanigan-Schmidt began by exhibiting his art in his own apartment; an early major exhibit in 1969 was titled The Sacristy of the Hamptons. Another home exhibit was titled The Summer Palace of Czarina Tatlina. In these early home exhibits, and also in at least one later recreation of an early exhibit, he guided visitors through the exhibit in drag, as the character art collector Ethel Dull. His work has received critical acclaim, despite not being very widely known.

Reasons for Thomas Lanigan-Schmidt's art not reaching a wider audience totally elude me. This is major, major work, reflecting and augmenting today's dialogue in a unique and commanding voice. Many artists, including a generation of Lanigan-Schmidt's students, have been repeatedly amazed, inspired and guided by its panache, rapier-sharp wit, subversiveness and opulent beauty.

— Robert Kushner for Art in America

Lanigan-Schmidt's artwork has been compared to that of Florine Stettheimer, who also used cellophane in her sets for the Gertrude Stein/Virgil Thomson opera Four Saints in Three Acts; his art was included in an exhibit of artists influenced by Stettheimer. His work has also been likened to the religious-themed tinfoil-covered thrones of art brut artist James Hampton. He is sometimes grouped with the Pattern and Decoration art movement, though he says that is "retrospective craziness". His art is noted for its incorporation of Catholic iconography. Joe Brainard is also cited as an influence with his use of decorative collage and queer and religious themes. He has been referenced as an antecedent to Jeff Koons in the intentional use of kitsch in art.

Lanigan-Schmidt's work has been included in major art museum survey exhibits. His art was in the 1984 Venice Biennale, and his trip there inspired his 1985 Venetian Glass Series. His foil rats and drag queens produced in the 1970s were included in the 1995 exhibit "In A Different Light" at the Berkeley Art Museum, which was curated by Lawrence Rinder and Nayland Blake. His art was included in the 1991 Whitney Biennial as well as the Whitney Museum's survey of 20th-century art, "The American century: art & culture 1900-2000."

From November 18, 2012, to April 7, 2013, Lanigan-Schmidt's art was the subject of a retrospective at MoMA PS1.
