= Mikoyan MiG-31 =

Interceptor aircraft

MiG-31
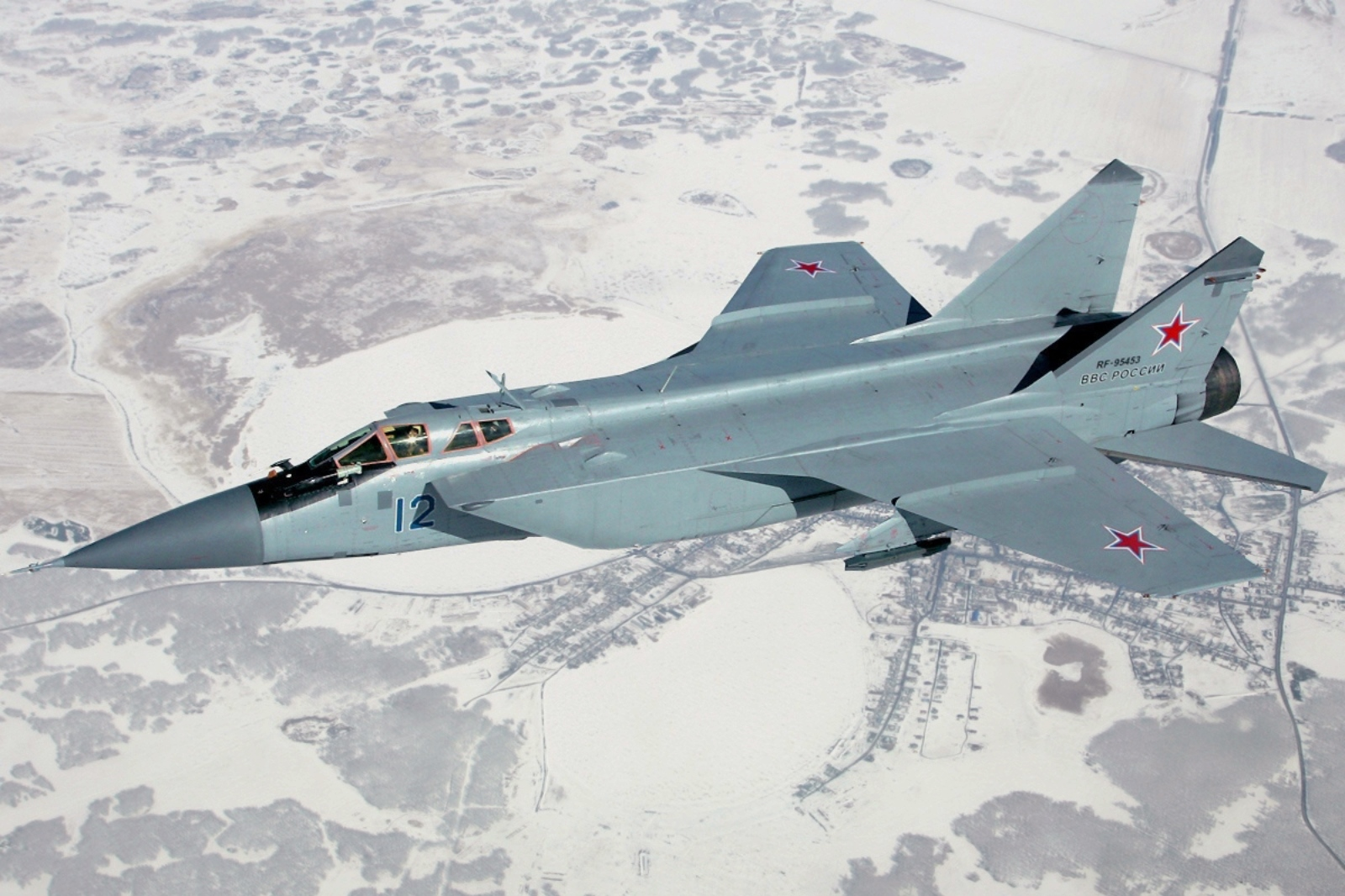
- A Russian Air Force MiG-31DZ in flight over Russia

General information
- Type: Interceptor aircraft
- National origin: Soviet Union
- Manufacturer: Mikoyan-Gurevich/Mikoyan
- Status: In service with the Russian Air Force
- Primary users: Russian Aerospace Forces Kazakh Air Defense Forces (historical)
- Number built: 519

History
- Manufactured: 1975–1994
- Introduction date: 6 May 1981
- First flight: 16 September 1975; 51 years ago
- Retired: 2023 (Kazakh Air Force)
- Developed from: Mikoyan-Gurevich MiG-25

The Mikoyan MiG-31 (Russian: Микоян МиГ-31; NATO reporting name: Foxhound) is a supersonic interceptor aircraft developed for the Soviet Air Forces by the Mikoyan design bureau as a replacement for the MiG-25 "Foxbat", on which it is based and with which it shares design elements.

The MiG-31 is the fastest known operational combat aircraft still active, with a top speed around 3,000 km/h (1,600 knots). It continues to be operated by the Russian Aerospace Forces following the end of the Cold War and the collapse of the Soviet Union in 1991. The other operator, the Kazakh Air Defence Forces, retired the type in 2023. The Russian Defence Ministry expects the MiG-31 to remain in service until at least 2030; that was confirmed in 2020 when an announcement was made to extend the service lifetime of the existing airframes from 2,500 to 3,500 hours. The MiG-31K variant carries the Kh-47M2 Kinzhal conventional or nuclear warhead-capable air-launched ballistic missile.

== Development ==
=== Background ===
The single-seat MiG-25 could achieve high speed, altitude, and rate of climb, but it lacked maneuverability at interception speeds and was difficult to fly at low altitudes. The MiG-25's speed was normally limited to Mach 2.83, but it could reach a maximum speed of at least Mach 3.2 with the risk of engine damage.

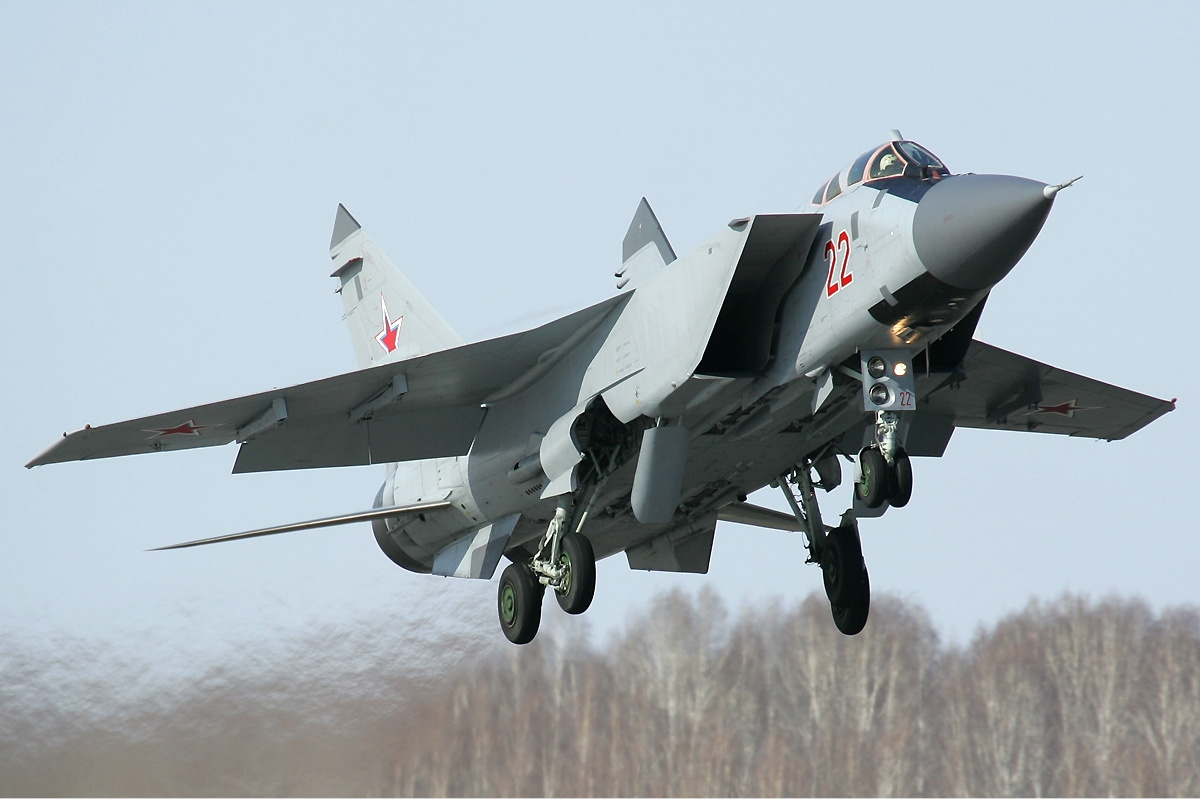
A Russian Air Force MiG-31BM taking off from Chelyabinsk Shagol Airport, 2012

Development of the MiG-25's replacement began with the Ye-155MP (Russian: Е-155МП) prototype, which first flew on 16 September 1975. Although it bore a superficial resemblance to the MiG-25, it had a longer fuselage to accommodate the radar operator's cockpit, and was in many respects a new design. An important development was the MiG-31's advanced radar, capable of both look-up and look-down/shoot-down engagement, as well as multiple target tracking. This gave the Soviet Union an interceptor with the capability to engage the most likely Western intruders (low-flying cruise missiles and bombers) at long range. The MiG-31 replaced the Tu-128 as the Soviet Union's dedicated long-range interceptor, with far more advanced sensors and weapons, while its range is almost double that of the MiG-25.

Like that of its MiG-25 predecessor, the introduction of the MiG-31 was surrounded by early speculation and misinformation concerning its design and abilities. The West learned of the new interceptor from Lieutenant Viktor Belenko, a pilot who defected to Japan in 1976 with his MiG-25P. Belenko described an upcoming "Super Foxbat" with two seats and an ability to intercept cruise missiles. According to his testimony, the new interceptor was to have air intakes similar to the Mikoyan-Gurevich MiG-23, which the MiG-31 does not have, at least in production variants.

=== Production ===
Serial production of the MiG-31 began in 1979, being Rostislav Belyakov its chief engineer. The first production batch of 519 MiG-31s including 349 "baseline models" was produced at the Sokol plant between 1976 and 1988. The second batch of 101 MiG-31DZs was produced from 1989 to 1991. The final batch of 69 MiG-31B aircraft was produced between 1990 and 1994. From the final batch, 50 were retained by the Kazakhstan Air Force after the dissolution of the Soviet Union. Of the "baseline models", 40 airframes were upgraded to MiG-31BS standard.

=== Upgrades and replacement ===
Some upgrade programs have found their way into the MiG-31 fleet, such as the MiG-31BM multirole version with upgraded avionics, new multimode radar, hands-on-throttle-and-stick (HOTAS) controls, liquid crystal (LCD) colour multifunction displays (MFDs), ability to carry the R-77 missile and various Russian air-to-ground missiles (AGMs) such as the Kh-31 anti-radiation missile (ARM), a new and more powerful computer, and digital data links. A project to upgrade the Russian MiG-31 fleet to the MiG-31BM standard began in 2010; 100 aircraft were to be upgraded to the MiG-31BM standard by 2020. Russian Federation Defence Ministry chief Colonel Yuri Balyko has claimed that the upgrade would increase the combat effectiveness of the aircraft several times over. 18 MIG-31BMs were delivered in 2014. The Russian military was to receive more than 130 upgraded MiG-31BMs, with the first 24 aircraft already delivered according to Russian Deputy Defence Minister Yuri Borisov in his press briefing on 9 April 2015.

Russia planned to start development of a replacement for the MiG-31 by 2019. The aircraft would be called PAK-DP (ПАК ДП, Перспективный авиационный комплекс дальнего перехвата – Prospective Air Complex for Long-Range Interception). Development of the new aircraft, designated MiG-41, began in April 2013. Such development is favored over restarting MiG-31 production. In March 2014, Russian test pilot Anatoly Kvochur said that work began on a Mach 4 capable MiG-41 based on the MiG-31. Later reports stated that the development of the MiG-31 replacement was to begin in 2017, with the first aircraft expected to be delivered in 2020, and the replacement entering service in 2025. This has currently yet to happen.

== Design ==
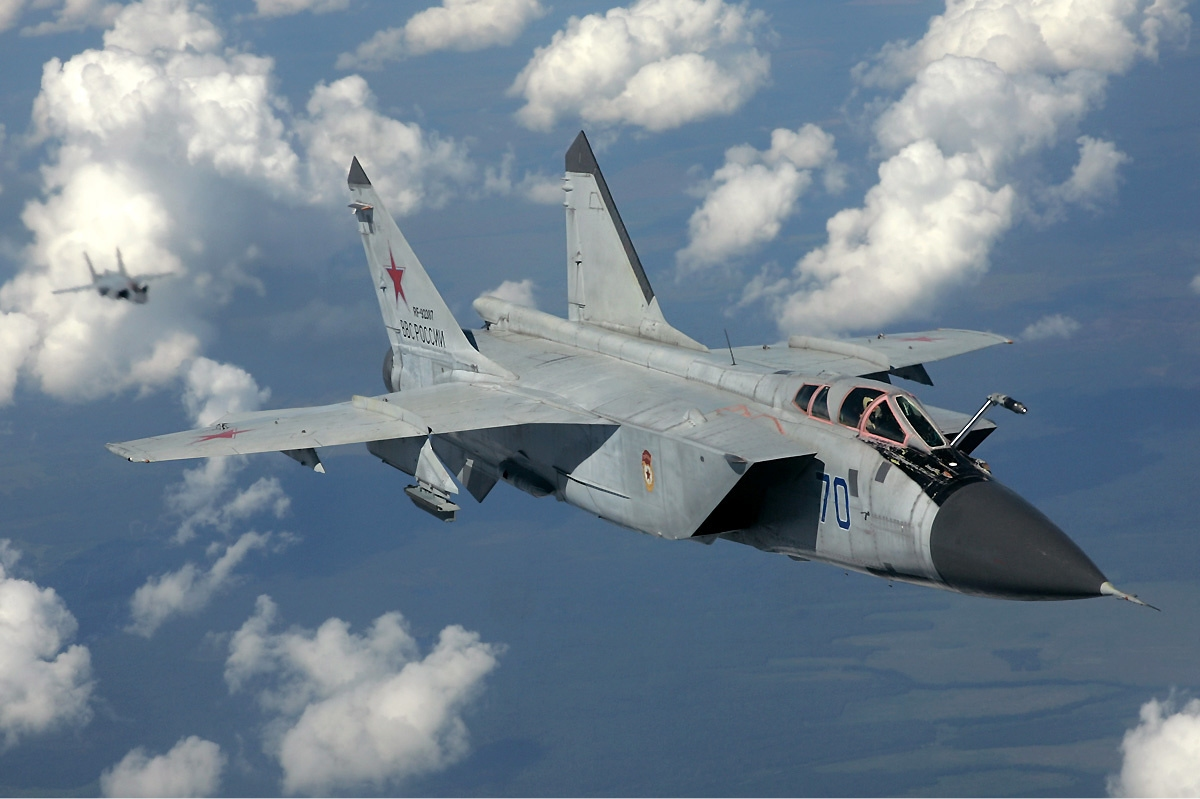
Russian Air Force MiG-31B in 2011

Like the MiG-25, the MiG-31 is a large twin-engined aircraft with side-mounted air intake ramps, a shoulder-mounted wing with an aspect ratio of 2.94, and twin vertical tailfins. Unlike the MiG-25, it has two seats, with the rear occupied by a dedicated weapon systems officer.

The MiG-31 was designed to fulfill these mission objectives:

- Intercept cruise missiles and their launch aircraft by reaching missile launch range in the shortest possible time after departing the loiter area
- Detect and destroy low flying cruise missiles, UAVs and helicopters
- Long-range escort of strategic bombers
- Provide strategic air defense in areas not covered by ground-based air defense systems

The MiG-31 is limited to five g when travelling at supersonic speeds. While flying under combat weight, its wing loading is marginal and its thrust-to-weight ratio is favorable. The MiG-31 is not designed for close combat or rapid turning.

The wings and airframe of the MiG-31 are stronger than those of the MiG-25, permitting supersonic flight at low altitudes. Like the MiG-25, its flight surfaces are built primarily of nickel-steel alloy, enabling the aircraft to tolerate kinetic heating at airspeeds approaching Mach 3. The MiG-31 airframe comprises 49% arc-welded nickel steel, 33% light metal alloy, 16% titanium, and 2% composites. Its D30-F6 jet engines, each rated at 152 kN thrust, allow a maximum speed of Mach 1.23 at low altitude. High-altitude speed is temperature-redlined to Mach 2.83 – the thrust-to-drag ratio is sufficient for speeds in excess of Mach 3, but such speeds pose unacceptable hazards to engine and airframe life in routine use.

=== Electronics suite ===
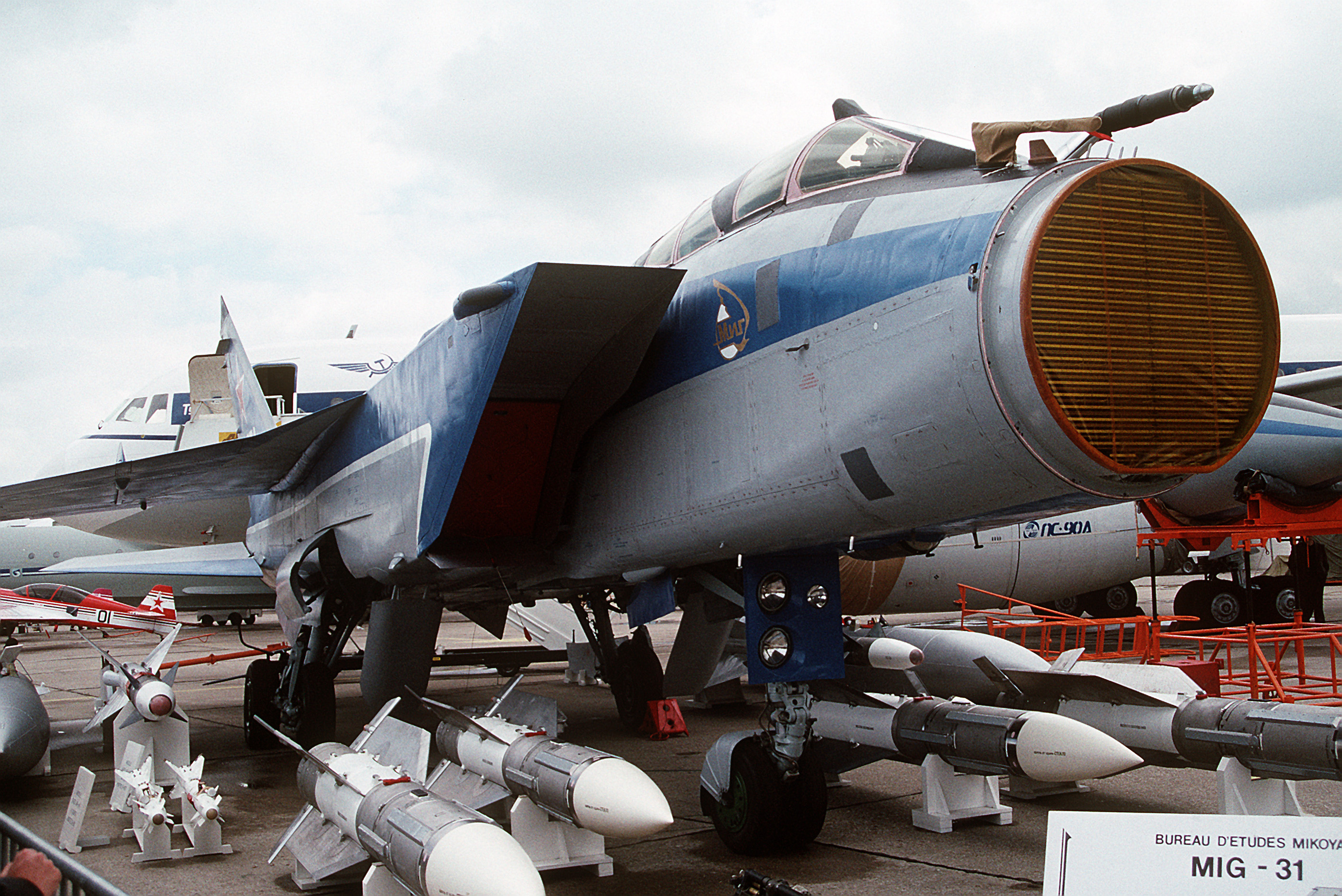
MiG-31BM, Zaslon phased-array radar visible

The MiG-31 was among the first aircraft with a phased-array radar. Its maximum range against fighter-sized targets is about 200 km (120 mi), and it can track up to 10 targets and simultaneously attack four of them with its Vympel R-33 missiles. The radar is matched with an infrared search and track system in a retractable under-nose fairing.

The aircraft was equipped with RK-RLDN and APD-518 digital secure datalinks. The RK-RLDN datalink is for communication with ground-control centers. The APD-518 datalink enables a flight of four MiG-31s to automatically exchange radar-generated data within 200 km (120 mi) of each other. It also enables other aircraft with less sophisticated avionics, such as MiG-23s, 25s, and 29s and Su-15s and 27s, to be directed to targets spotted by MiG-31 (a maximum of four (long-range) for each MiG-31 aircraft). The A-50 AEW aircraft and MiG-31 can automatically exchange aerial and terrestrial radar target designation, as well as air defense. The MiG-31 is equipped with ECM of radar and infrared ranges.

The flight-navigation equipment of the MiG-31 includes a complex of automatic control system SAU-155МP and sighting-navigation complex KN-25 with two inertial systems and IP-1-72A with digital computer, electronic long-range navigation system Radical NP (312) or A-331, electronic system of the long-range navigation A-723. Distant radio navigation is carried out by means of two systems: Chayka (similar to the system of Loran) and «Route» (similar to the system of Omega).

Similarly to the complex S-300 missile system, aircraft group with APD-518 can share data obtained by various radars from different directions (active or passive scanning of radiation) and summarize the data. The target can be detected passively (via its emissions of jamming or use of its radar) and/or actively simultaneously from many different directions (with the MiG-31 using its radar). Every aircraft with the APD-518 will have the exact data, even if it is not involved in the search.

- interacting with ground-based automated digital control system (ACS «Rubezh» Operating radius of 2,000 kilometres (1,200 mi), can control multiple groups of planes), operating modes of remote aiming, semiautomated actions (coordinate support), singly, and also to direct on the target missiles launched from the other aircraft.
- Digital immune system provides the automatic exchange of tactical information in a group of four interceptors, remote one from another at a distance of 200 km (120 mi) and aiming at the target group of fighters with less-powerful avionics (in this case the aircraft performs the role of guidance point or repeater).

A group of four MiG-31 interceptors is able to control an area of air space across a total length of 800 to 900 kilometres (500 to 560 mi); its radar possessing a maximum detection range of 200 kilometres (120 mi) in distance (radius) and the typical width of detection along the front of 225 kilometres (140 mi).

=== Radars ===
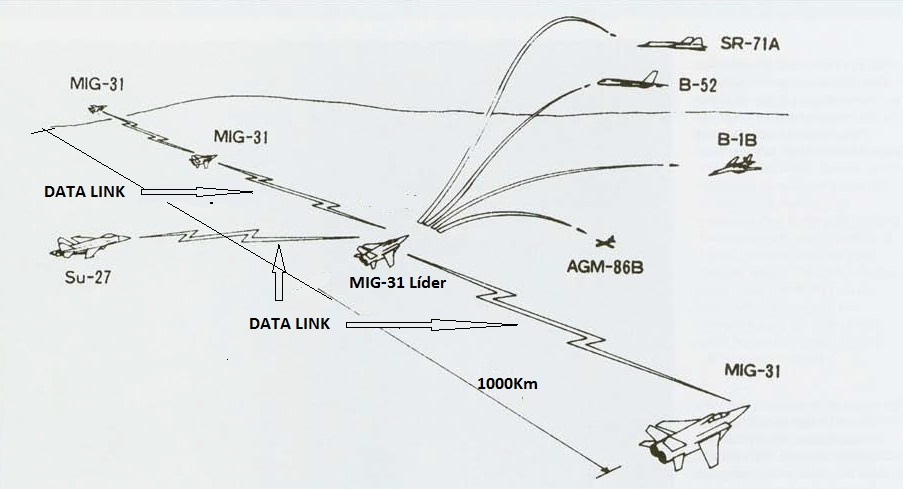
Diagram shows how four MiG-31s can keep up to 1,000 km (620 mi) under control, and how the leader can pass information to friendly fighters.

Adopted in 1981, RP-31 N007 backstop (Russian: Zaslon).

- the range of detection of air targets with Zaslon-A: 200 km (120 mi) (for the purpose of a radar cross-section of 19 m^{2} on a collision angle with probability 0.5)
- target detection distance with radar cross-section of 3 m^{2} (32 sq ft) in the rear within 35 km (22 mi) with a probability of 0.5
- number of detected targets: 24 (was originally 10)
- number of targets for attack: 6 (was originally 4)
- range of automatic tracking: 120 kilometres (75 mi)
- detection of infrared signature targets: 56 kilometres (35 mi)
- Effective in the detection of cruise missiles and other targets against ground clutter
- Until 2000, it was the world's only fighter in service equipped with phased array radar, when the Mitsubishi F-2 entered service with the more advanced J/APG-1 Active Electronically Scanned Array radar.
- Able to intercept and destroy cruise missiles flying at extremely low altitudes.

=== Variant differences ===
The basic differences between other versions and the MiG-31BM are:

- The onboard radar complex of the MiG-31BM can track 24 airborne targets at one time, six of which can be simultaneously attacked by R-33S missiles.
- Modernized variants of the aircraft can be equipped with anti-radiation missiles Kh-31, Kh-25MR or MPU (up to six units), anti-ship Kh-31A (up to six), air-to-surface class missiles Kh-29 and Kh-59 (up to three) or Kh-59M (up to two units), up to six precision bombs KAB-1500 or eight KAB-500 with television or laser-guidance. Maximum mass of payload is 9,000 kilograms (20,000 lb).
- The MiG-31M, MiG-31D, and MiG-31BM standard aircraft have an upgraded Zaslon-M radar, with larger antenna and greater detection range (said to be 400 kilometres (250 mi) against AWACS-size targets) and the ability to attack multiple targets – air and ground – simultaneously. The Zaslon-M has a 1.4 m (4.6 ft) diameter (larger) antenna, with 50–100% better performance than Zaslon. In April 1994 it was used with an R-37 to hit a target at 300 kilometres (190 mi) distance. It has a search range of 400 km (250 mi) for a 19–20 m^{2} (200–220 sq ft) RCS target and can track 24 targets at once, engaging six, or 282 km (175 mi) for 5 m^{2} (54 sq ft). Relative target speed detection increased from Mach 5 to Mach 6, improving the probability of destroying fast-moving targets. The MiG-31BM is one of only a few Soviet aircraft able to intercept and destroy cruise missiles flying at extremely low altitude.

=== Cockpit ===
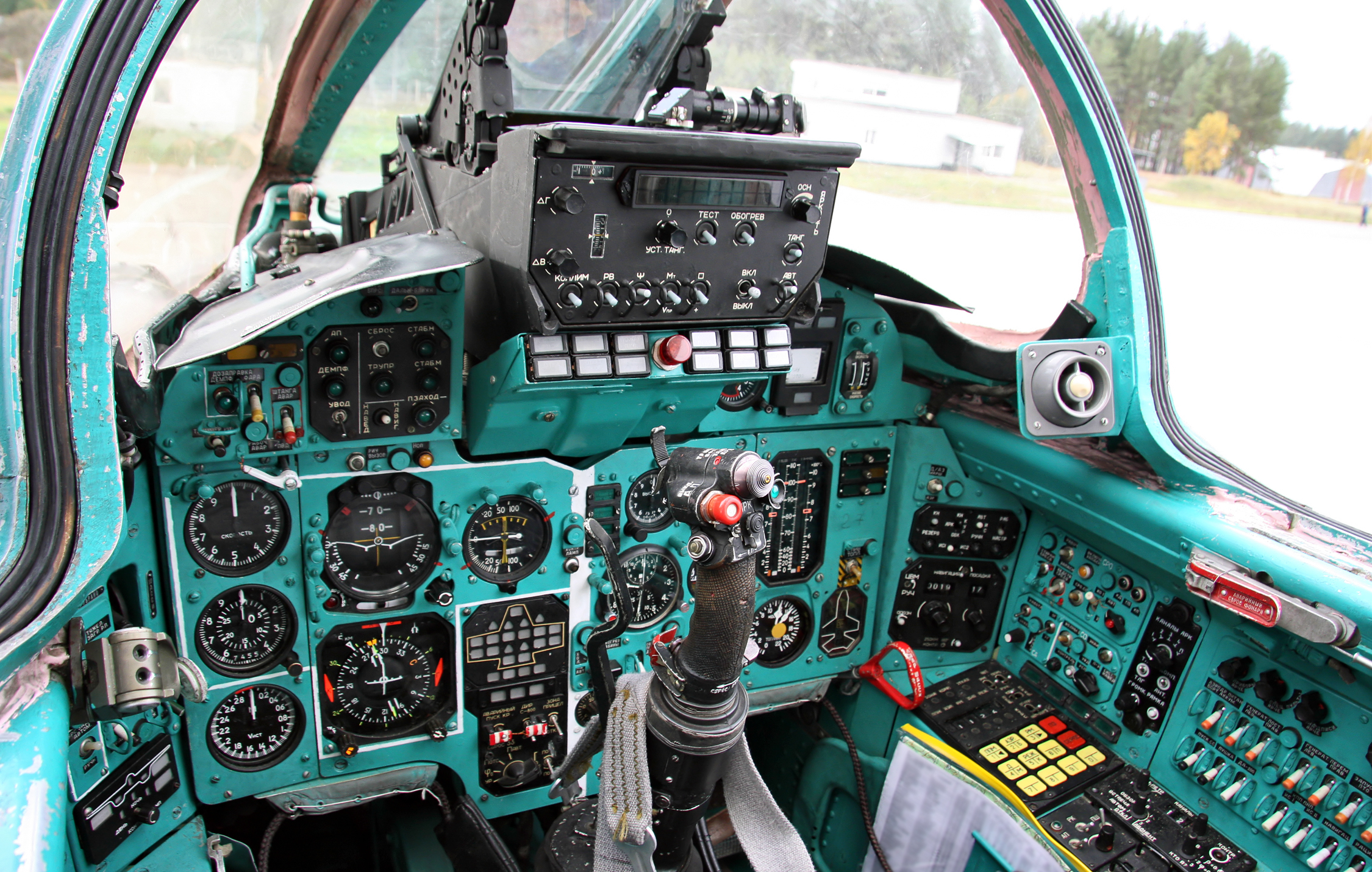
Front seat cockpit of an older MiG-31 variant

The aircraft is a two-seater with the rear seat occupant controlling the radar. Although cockpit controls are duplicated across cockpits, it is normal for the aircraft to be flown only from the front seat. The pilot flies the aircraft by means of a centre stick and left hand throttles. The rear cockpit has only two small vision ports on the sides of the canopy. The presence of the WSO (weapon systems operator) in the rear cockpit improves aircraft effectiveness since the WSO is entirely dedicated to radar operations and weapons deployment, thus decreasing the workload of the pilot and increasing efficiency. Both cockpits are fitted with zero/zero ejection seats which allow the crew to eject at any altitude and airspeed.

=== Armament ===
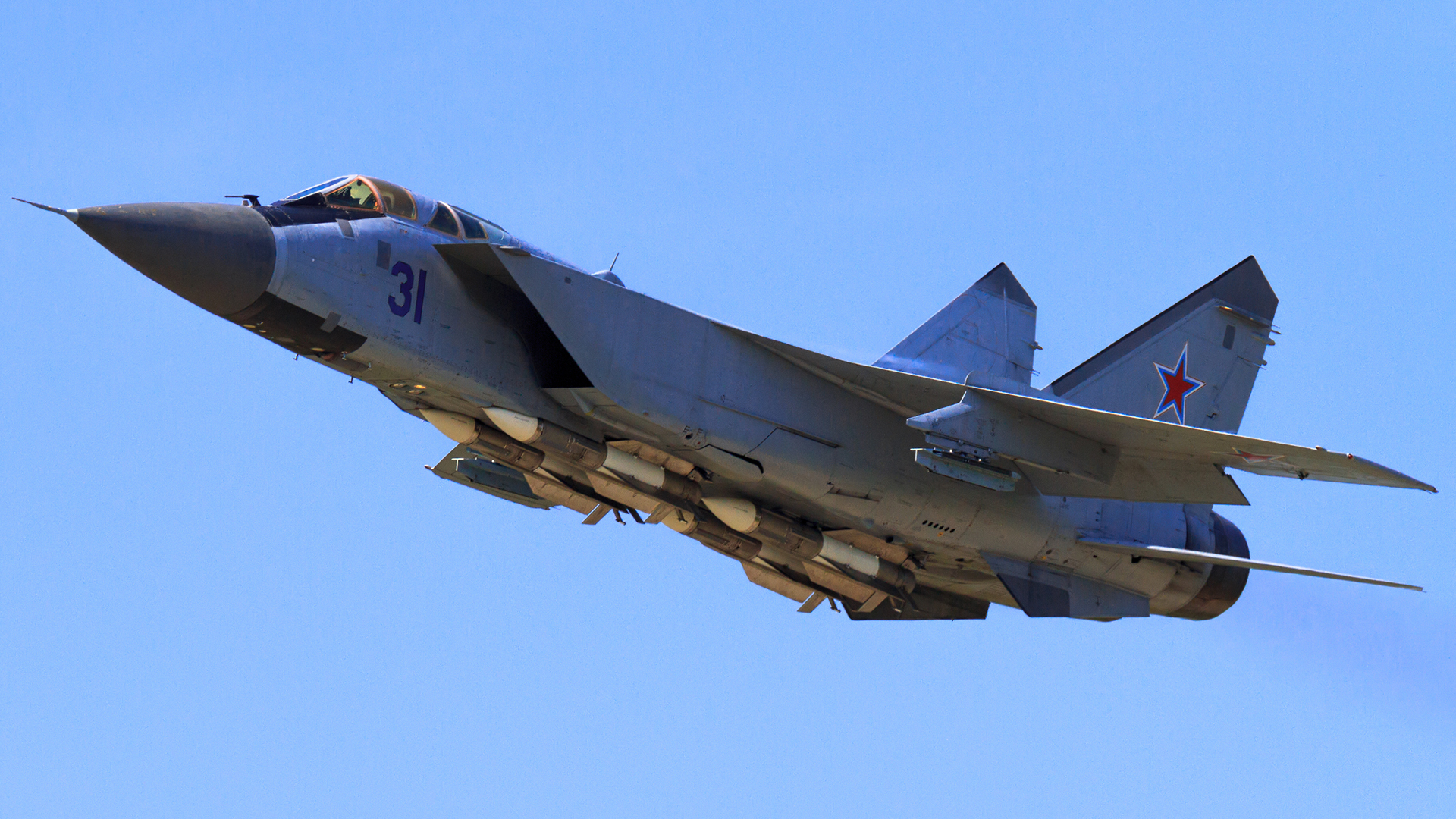
A Russian Air Force MiG-31BM armed with R-33 missiles.

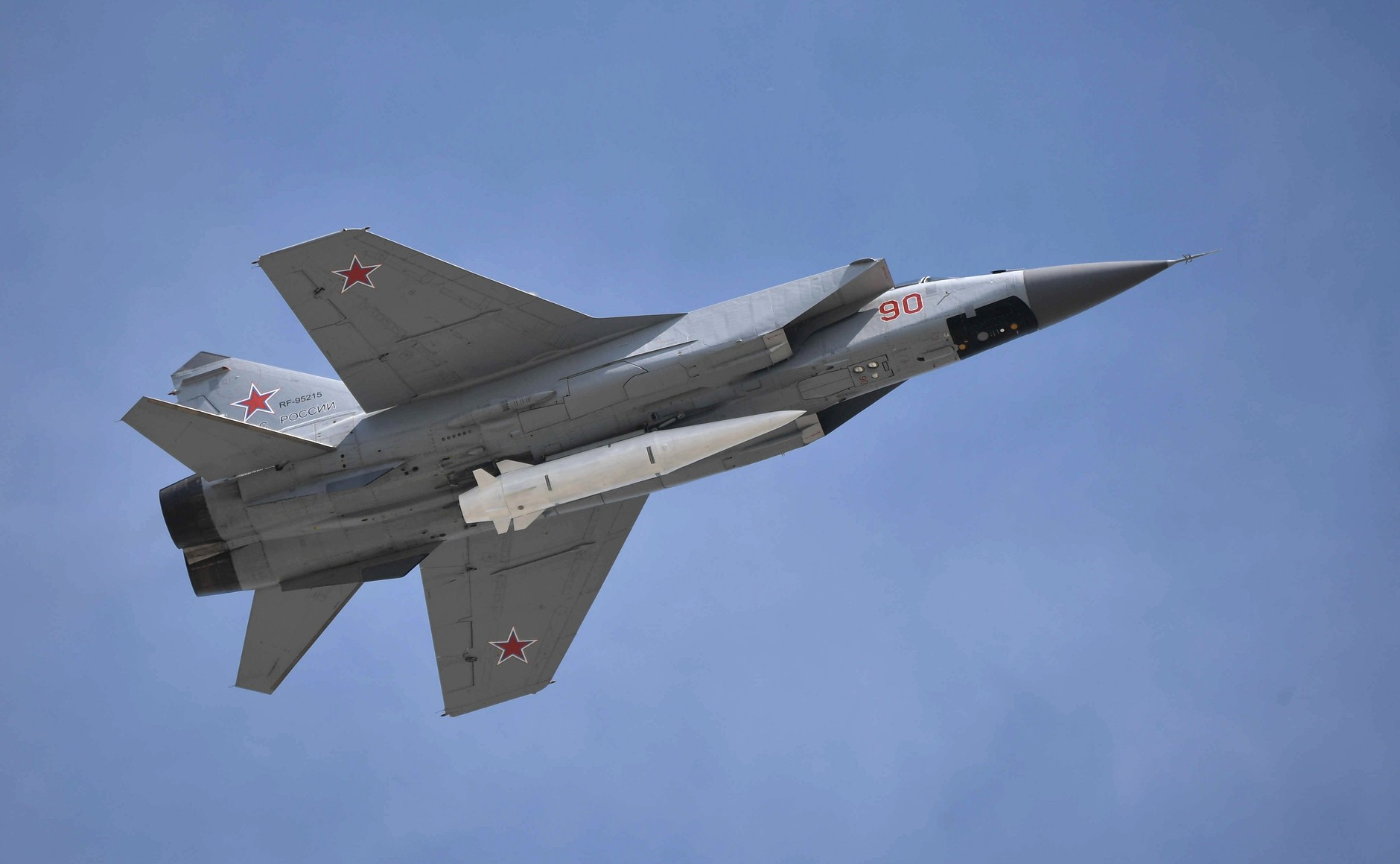
A Russian Aerospace Forces MiG-31BM armed with Kh-47M2 Kinzhal missile.

The MiG-31's main armament is four R-33 air-to-air missiles (NATO codename AA-9 'Amos') carried under the belly.

- One GSh-6-23 23 mm (0.91 in) cannon with 260 rounds. (The MiG-31's predecessor, the MiG-25, did not include a cannon.)
- Fuselage recesses for four R-33 (AA-9 'Amos') or four R-37 (AA-13 'Arrow') (MiG-31BM only).
- Four underwing pylons for a combination of six places for charging (two spaces to add removable fuel tanks)
  - Six R-37 long-range air-to-air missiles 280 kilometres (170 mi).
  - Four R-33 long-range missiles 300 kilometres (190 mi).
  - Kh-31 (AS-17 'Krypton') long-range air-to-ground missiles (200 kilometres [120 mi]) for high-speed target (maneuvering with an overload of 8 g).
  - R-33 (AA-9 "Amos") (1981) 120 kilometres (75 mi), R-33S (1999) 160 kilometres (99 mi).
  - Two or four (superior limit)× R-40TD1 (AA-6 'Acrid') medium-range missiles (R-40 – 50–80 kilometres [31–50 mi]), MiG-25P, 1970) launched at altitudes of 0.5–3 kilometres (0.31–1.86 mi) (maneuvering with overload four g).
  - Four R-60 (AA-8 'Aphid')
    - Four R-73 (AA-11 'Archer') short-range IR missiles,
    - Four R-77 (AA-12 'Adder') medium-range missiles (100 kilometres [62 mi]) for high-speed target (maneuvering with overload of 12 g).
- Some aircraft are equipped to launch the Kh-31P (AS-17 'Krypton') and Kh-58 (AS-11 'Kilter') anti-radiation missiles in the Suppression of Enemy Air Defenses (SEAD) role. Anti-ship missiles Kh-31A (up to six) and air-to-surface missiles Kh-59 and Kh-29T (up to three) or X-59M (up to two units), up to six air bombs KAB-1500, or up to eight KAB-500 with a television or laser-guidance. Maximum weight of the combat load is 9,000 kilograms (20,000 lb).
- One Kh-47M2 Kinzhal high-precision ballistic missile with a range of about 2,000 km (1,200 mi) (including range of launching aircraft), Mach 10 speed. It can carry both conventional and nuclear warheads. To carry the Kh-47M2, modifications were required which also included the removal of the auxiliary power unit (APU) for air-to-air missiles, the resultant MiG-31K has the sole role of an attack aircraft for long range strike.

== Operational history ==
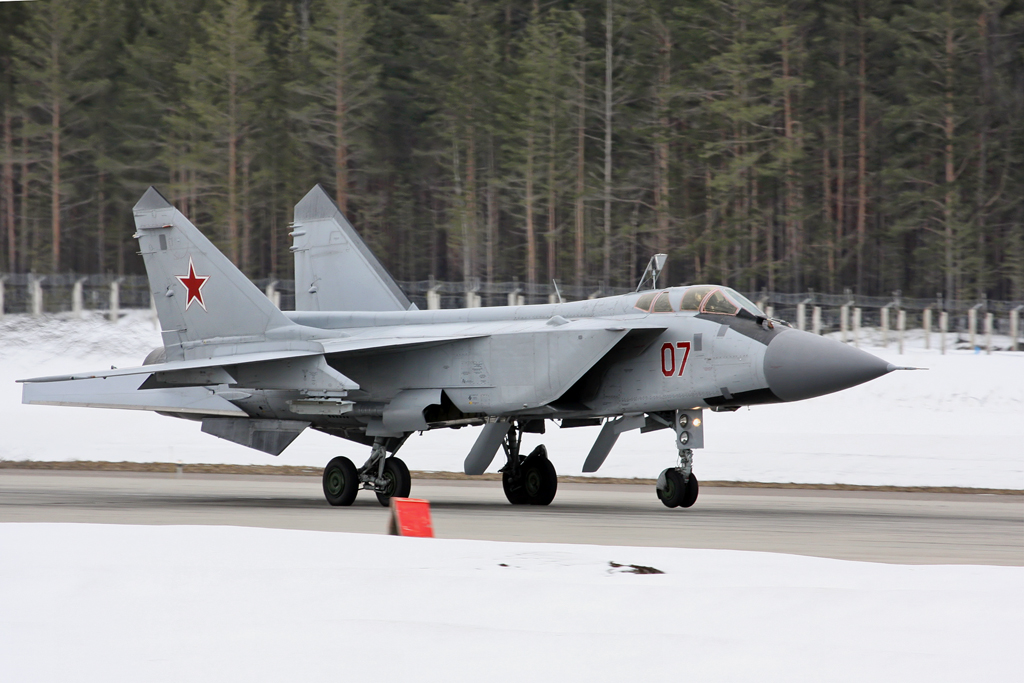
A side view of a MiG-31 from 790th Fighter Order of Kutuzov Aviation Regiment on the runway of Khotilovo airbase, Tver region.

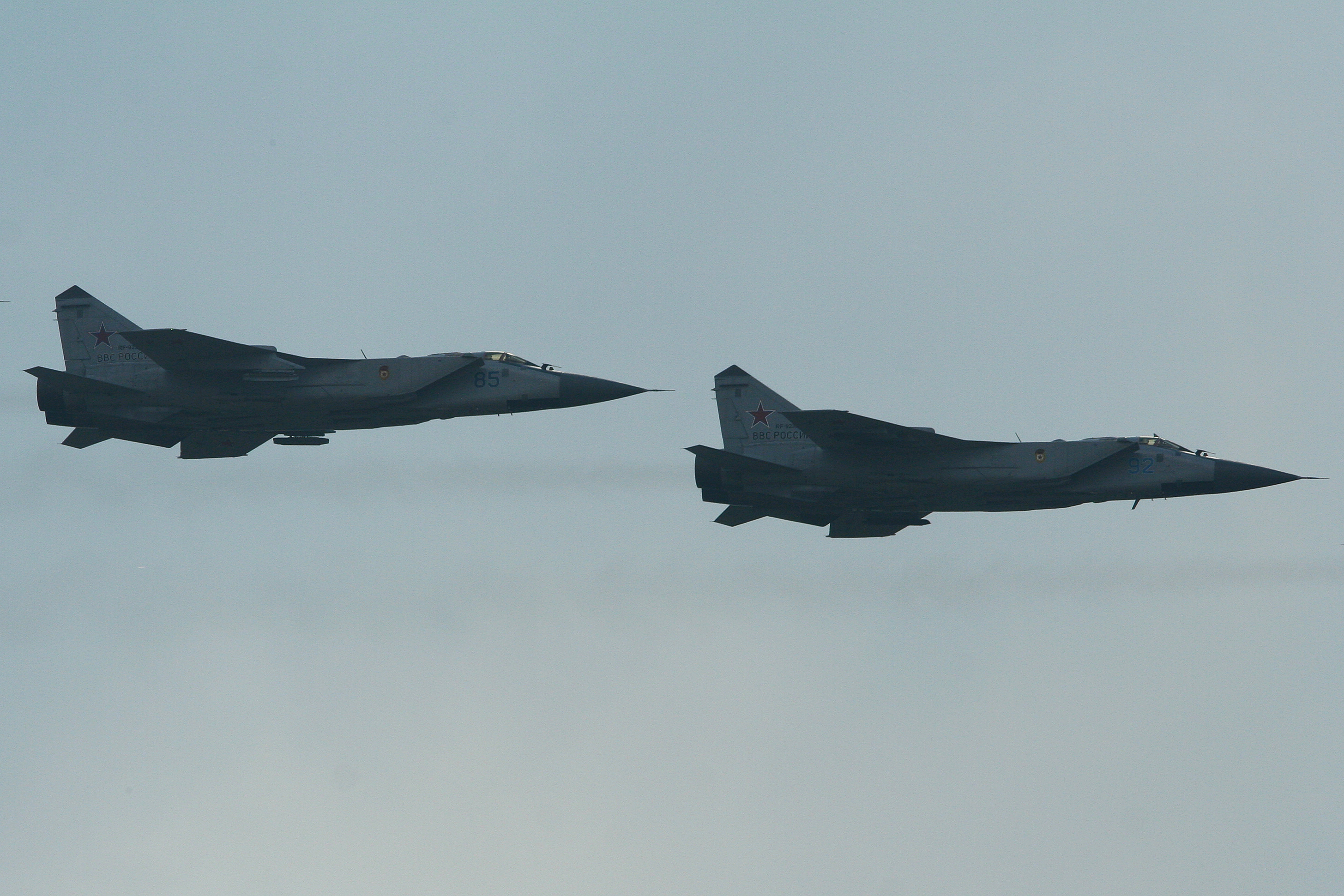
A MiG-31B on left and MiG-31BM on right flying in formation.

=== Soviet Union and the Russian Federation ===
Serial production of the MiG-31 began in 1979. The MiG-31 entered operational service with the Soviet Air Defence Forces (PVO) in 1981.

==== Russian invasion of Ukraine ====
During the 2022 Russian invasion of Ukraine, MiG-31s reportedly shot down several Ukrainian aircraft, mainly by using the long range R-37 air-to-air missile. By remaining at high speed and high altitude, MiG-31s have been able to operate virtually unopposed due to Ukrainian fighters lacking range, speed, or altitude necessary to engage the MiG-31.

As of 8 September 2024, three MiG-31BMs have been visually confirmed as lost, with two being destroyed by Ukrainian missile strikes on Belbek airfield in occupied Crimea on 15 May 2024. The third crashed during takeoff on the same airfield on 1 October 2022, with satellite images showing clear visible wreckage, with the jet having run off the end of the runway, falling off a cliff before exploding.

The R-37M has, since October 2022, been the main threat against the Ukrainian Air Force. The Ukrainian Air Force has a significant lack of fire-and-forget missiles. They relied on the R-27 missiles, both the R-27ER and R-27ET; the R-27ER's range is 60 mi (97 km). A Ukrainian pilot must illuminate a Russian aircraft with radar to guide the missile to the target. Russian pilots firing the active-radar, fire-and-forget R-77 give them the ability to launch their missiles and then take evasive action. Ukrainian pilots were forced to "exploit ground clutter and terrain-masking to get close enough to fire before being engaged". During the first three days of the war both sides lost aircraft. The Ukrainians replaced them with older airframes that were made flyable. The Russian Aerospace Forces turned to the MiG-31 with the R-37M missile that has a range of 200 mi (320 km). Combined with the superior radar on the MiG-31, the Ukrainian Air Force has started losing more aircraft. A report by the Royal United Services Institute states that in October some six R-37Ms were being fired at the Ukrainian Air Force a day. Four MiG-31s were also deployed to Crimea. To avoid R-37M missiles, Ukraine has had to attempt to destroy MiG-31s while they are still on the ground, such as the attack on the Belbek airbase and an attempted drone attack in August.

On the early morning of 4 May 2023, a Kh-47M2 Kinzhal missile was intercepted by the Patriot air defense system according to the commander of the Ukrainian Air Force, general Mykola Oleschuk. The missile was fired from a MiG-31K in Russian airspace. Ukraine confirmed the intercept, saying it used the Patriot missile system protecting the Kyiv region.

On 15 May 2024, Russian-installed officials in Crimea claimed that a missile attack caused explosions and fires near the Belbek airfield. Some missiles (possibly ATACMS) struck dropping cluster munitions on the airfield, and according to photographic evidence and satellite imagery, at least two Russian ground-based air defense systems destroyed, likely destroying two MiG-31s, destroyed a fuel farm and damaged one Su-27.

On the morning of 16 May 2023, six Kh-47M2 Kinzhal missiles were fired at Kyiv. Ukrainian Air Force spokesperson said that they were launched from six MiG-31Ks. Ukraine claims that all Kinzhals were intercepted but one may have damaged a Patriot battery launcher according to US officials, although there is limited evidence.

After they were intercepted by Finnish aircraft over the Gulf of Finland on 19 September 2025, three MiG-31s entered Estonian airspace. The Russians had not presented a flight plan, the aircraft's transponders were switched off and they ignored radio calls. They stayed inside Estonian airspace for 12 minutes before being intercepted by Italian F-35 and escorted back to Russia. Estonia reacted to the incident by calling NATO for Article 4 consultations.

On 18 December 2025, Ukraine claimed it had destroyed a MiG-31 at Belbek airfield and provided video footage that appeared to support the claim.

On 26 April 2026, the Security Service of Ukraine (SBU) announced that it targeted a Russian MiG-31 at Belbek Air Base, near Sevastopol.

=== Kazakhstan ===
Kazakhstan inherited its MiG-31s from the Soviet Union and used them up till 2023, when they were finally retired and put up for auction. Reports emerged that these aircraft were sold to the United States, but this was refuted.

== Variants ==
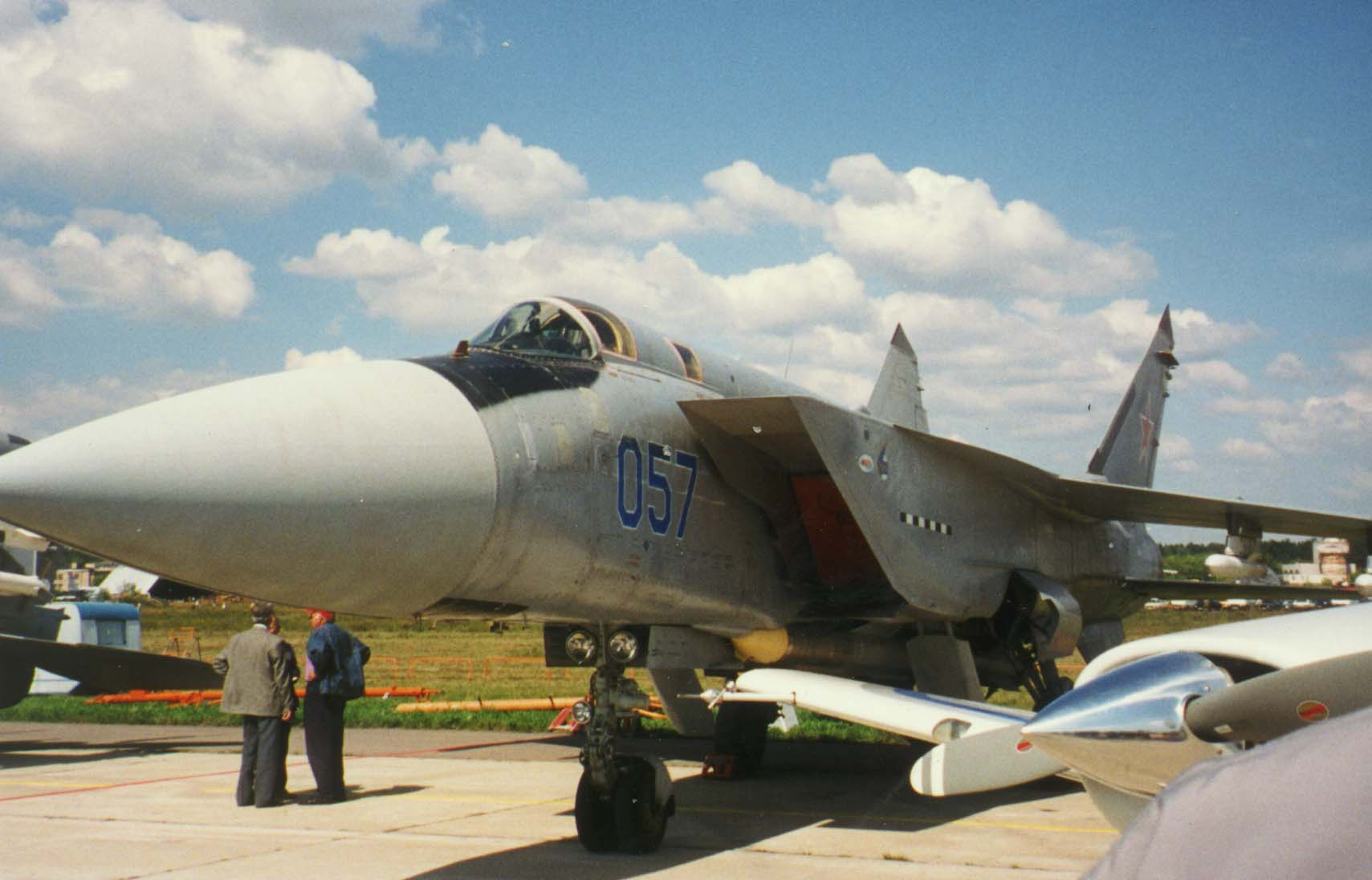
MiG-31M, displayed at the MAKS air show 1995, at Ramenskoye airport

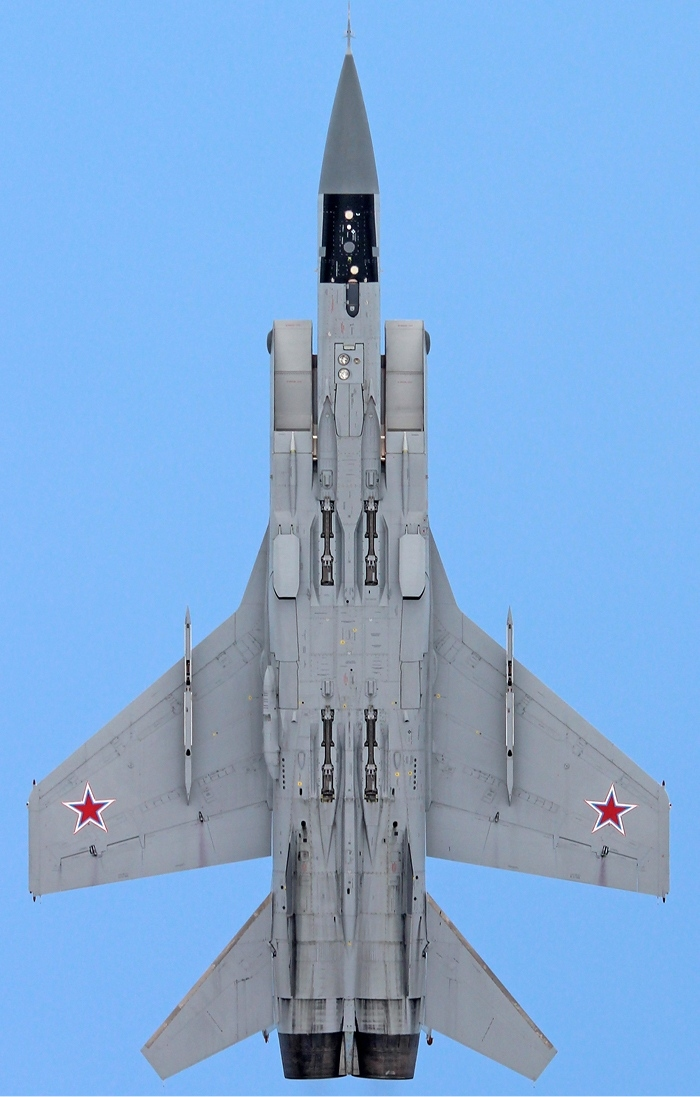
Bottom view of a MiG-31BM

Ye-155MP (MiG-25MP, Izdeliye 83)
Prototype modification of the early MiG-31. First flight on 16 September 1975.

MiG-31 (Izdeliye 01)
First variant which entered in serial production. A total of 500 aircraft were built.

MiG-31M (Izdeliye 05)
Development of a more comprehensive advanced version, the MiG-31M, began in 1984 and first flew in 1985, but the dissolution of the Soviet Union prevented it from entering full production. One piece rounded windscreen, small side windows for rear cockpit, wider and deeper dorsal spine. Digital flight controls added, multifunction CRT cockpit displays, multi-mode phased array radar. No gun fitted in this model, refueling probe moved to starboard side of aircraft, fuselage weapon stations increased from four to six by adding two centre-line stations. Maximum TO weight increased to 52,000 kg (115,000 lb) using increased thrust D-30F6M engines instead of the D-30F6 engines. One prototype and six flyable pre-production units were produced.

MiG-31D (Izdeliye 07)
Two aircraft were designated as Type 31D and were manufactured as dedicated anti-satellite models with ballast in the nose instead of radars, flat fuselage undersurface (i.e. no recessed weapon system bays) and had large winglets above and below the wing-tips. Equipped with Vympel ASAT missiles. Two prototypes were built.

MiG-31LL
Special modification used as a flying laboratory for testing of ejection seats during flight.

MiG-31 (Izdeliye 01DZ)
Two-seat all weather, all altitude interceptor. Designated as MiG-31 01DZ when fitted with air-to-air refueling probe. A total of 100 produced, with 45 being new builds and the rest being conversions from Izdeliye 01 aircraft.

MiG-31B (Izdeliye 01B)
Second production batch with upgraded avionics and in-flight refueling probe introduced in 1990. Its development was the result of the Soviet discovery that Phazotron radar division engineer Adolf Tolkachev had sold information on advanced radars to the West. A new version of the compromised radar was hastily developed. MiG-31B also have the improved ECM and EW equipment with integration of improved R-33S missiles. Long range navigation system compatible with Loran/Omega and Chaka ground stations added. This model replaced the 01DZ models in late 1990.

MiG-31E
Export version of the MiG-31B with simplified avionics. Never entered in serial production.

MiG-31BS (Izdeliye 01BS)
Designation applied to type 01DZ when converted to MiG-31B standard.

MiG-31BM
After passing state testing in 2008, this modernized variant of MiG-31B was approved for introduction into air force of Russia. A total of 50 planes are modified to the MiG-31BM (Bolshaya Modernizatsiya/Big Modernization) standard, in accordance with the 2011 contract. The efficiency of the modernized MiG-31BM is 2.6 times greater than the basic MiG-31. The MiG-31BМ's maximum detection range for air targets was increased in the upgrade to 320 km (200 mi). It had the ability to automatically track up to ten targets, and the latest units can track up to 24 targets and simultaneously engage up to eight targets. The on-board Argon-K is replaced with the new Baget 55-06 computer that selects four targets of the highest priority, which simultaneously are engaged by long-range R-33S air-to-air missiles. A new long range missile R-37 (missile) with a speed of Mach 6 and a range of up to 400 km (250 mi) is developed during the modernization process for use with the newly modernized MiG-31. The MiG-31BM has a multi-role capability, and is capable of using anti-radar, air-to-ship and air-to-ground missiles. Some of its avionics are unified with the MiG-29SMT. It also has a refueling probe. MiG-31BM set a sustained flight record for the model while spending seven hours and four minutes in the air while covering the distance of 8,000 km (5,000 mi).

MiG-31BSM
An upgrade of the BS version, it is the latest modernization variant first time contracted in 2014 for modernization of 60 aircraft, it is very similar in some aspects to the BM standard. Unlike the BS standard, aircraft modernized into the BSM standard are equipped with air refueling probe. Improvements were made to the aircraft canopy, where new and better heat resistant glass was used, thus enabling the MiG-31BSM to fly with cruise speed of 3,000 km/h (1,900 mph) at long distances without any damage. Furthermore, new faster central computer Baget-55-06 is used with addition of multi-functional displays, one for the pilot and three for the weapons operator-navigator. Also there is a new set of navigation equipment. The MiG-31BSM has multi-role capability with ability to use anti-radar, anti-ship and air-to-ground missiles. The main visible difference between the BS and BSM standards a rear-view periscope above the front cockpit canopy.

MiG-31K
Modified MiG-31BM variant able to carry the hypersonic Kh-47M2 Kinzhal ALBM. Ten aircraft were modified by May 2018. With this modification and with removed auxiliary power unit (APU) for air-to-air missiles, the aircraft gained a sole role of an attack aircraft.

MiG-31F
Planned fighter-bomber intended for use with TV, radar and laser-guided ASM weapon systems. Never entered serial production.

MiG-31FE
Planned export version of the MiG-31F.

MiG-31I (Ishim)
Proposed modification for air launch to orbit of small spacecraft with a payload of 160 kg (350 lb) to 300 km (190 mi) altitude or 120 kg (260 lb) to 600 km (370 mi) altitude orbit.

MiG-31 (Izdeliye 08)
MiG-31 modified into a launch-platform for the Izdeliye 293 Burevestnik anti-satellite missile. At least two prototypes are converted. Tests from September 2018.

MiG-31I
The latest version of the aircraft which reportedly adds an in-flight refueling capability and includes different engines, avionics and missiles, fly-by-wire and an electronic remote control system which allows to launch Kinzhal missiles at a predetermined moment. It is assumed that all MiG-31K aircraft will be upgraded to this standard. Completed flight tests in April 2024.

== Operators ==
Russia

- Russian Aerospace Forces
  - 4th Centre for Combat Application and Crew Training (Savasleyka)
  - 22nd Fighter Aviation Regiment (Tsentralnaya Uglovaya)
  - 98th Independent Composite Aviation Regiment (Monchegorsk)
  - 764th Fighter Aviation Regiment (Perm/Bolshoye Savino)
  - 712th Guards Fighter Aviation Regiment (Kansk)
  - 790th Fighter Aviation Regiment (Khotilovo/Borisovskiy)
  - 929th V.P. Chkalova State Flight Test Centre (Akhtubinsk)
    - From 85 to 131 MiG-31BM in inventory as of 2020. Deliveries of updated aircraft drawn from older models stocks continue as of 2024. Ten jets have been modified to the MiG-31K version and carry the Kh-47M2 Kinzhal missile as of May 2018. With this modification and with removed APU for air-to-air missiles, the aircraft gained a sole role of an attack aircraft.
- Russian Naval Aviation
  - 7060th Naval Aviation Air Base (Petropavlovsk-Kamchatskiy/Yelizovo)
    - 10 MiG-31B/BS and 22 MiG-31BM in inventory as of 2020.

=== Former operators ===
Soviet Union

- Soviet Air Forces aircraft passed to the Russian and Kazakh Air Forces after the dissolution of the Soviet Union.
- Soviet Air Defence Forces

Kazakhstan

- Kazakh Air Defense Forces
  - 610th Air Base (Sary-Arka Airport)
    - As of 2022, 31 aircraft were in inventory. The type was retired in 2023 and put up for auction. The aircraft were reportedly sold to US in April 2024. However it remains unclear who bought them, with Kazakh officials claiming that only local companies were allowed to bid.

=== Potential operators and failed bids ===
==== Algeria ====
Algeria was allegedly offered MiG-31s from the MiG corporation in exchange for its older MiG-25s which would be scrapped for parts to supply other MiG-25 users. Nothing came of this, and Algeria was the last operator of the MiG-25, also being the first to receive them in 1979.

==== Finland ====
In 1992 Russia offered the MiG-31 to Finland, which had a selection programme ongoing for a new fighter, but the offer was not submitted to the program, where Russia had submitted the MiG-29. Finland did not accept the offer, and chose the new fighter from the selection programme.

==== Iran ====
Russia was seeking to sell MiG-31 interceptors to the Islamic Republic of Iran Air Force (IRIAF) in response to Iranian calls to modernise their Airforce, with the first attempt occurring in the 1990-1992 time frame as a follow on to the MiG-29 and Su-24 purchase that Iran had made, the deal was also to include large numbers of other platforms and missile systems and would have included 24 airframes. The second attempt was in the 2001, with Iran reportedly paying in advance for the aircraft, but the deal was cancelled in both instances due to American pressure on the Russian government.

==== India ====
India was also offered the MiG-25 for MiG-31 trade deal that Algeria was. Indian pilots flew the MiG-31 in Russia, and the Foxhound was pitched to the IAF multiple times as a capable platform with multiple mission uses and its capable long-range engagement radar and missiles. The IAF has rejected the MiG-31s as a replacement for its MiG-25s (retired in 2006) as its focus was on acquiring more Multi-role aircraft (through the MMRCA) and its other roles could be fulfilled by other platforms (UAVs and Satellites for reconnaissance, Su-30MKIs for air-to-air combat).

==== Syria ====
Syria is reported to have ordered between five and eight MiG-31E aircraft in 2007 for the Syrian Air Force, allegedly partially funded by Iran. A Russian foreign ministry spokesperson - Mikhail Kamiynin - denied these reports stating that no such order had been placed. An order was placed again in 2008 or 2009, but suspended in May 2009 reportedly either due to Israeli pressure or lack of Syrian funds.

== Accidents ==
On 4 April 1984, a MiG-31 crashed while on a test flight, killing Mikoyan chief test pilot Aleksandr Vasilyevich Fedotov and his navigator V. Zaitsev.

On 26 April 2017, a MiG-31 crashed after it was accidentally hit by "friendly fire" during a training session near the Telemba proving ground in the Russian Far East. This occurred during a training exercise over the Telemba proving ground in Buryatia; both crew members ejected successfully. While Russian state media did not offer any details, independent investigators discovered from a leaked government document that the aircraft was shot down by an R-33 missile fired from another MiG-31 and that pilot error from both airplanes was at fault. The report also suggested problems with the Zaslon-AM radar and Baget-55 fire control system that might increase the risk of more accidental shootdowns.

On 16 April 2020, a MiG-31 interceptor of the Kazakh Air Force crashed in the country's Karaganda region.

On 8 April 2022, a MiG-31 of the Russian Aerospace Forces crashed in the Leningrad region.

On 2 December 2022, a MiG-31 of the Russian Aerospace Forces crashed during a training flight in the far eastern Primorsky Region.

On 26 April 2023, a MiG-31 of the Russian Aerospace Forces crashed during a training flight in northern Murmansk. The pilots reportedly ejected and survived.

On 4 July 2023, a MiG-31 of the Russian Aerospace Forces crashed during a training flight over Avacha Bay.

== Specifications (MiG-31) ==
MiG-31 3-view drawing

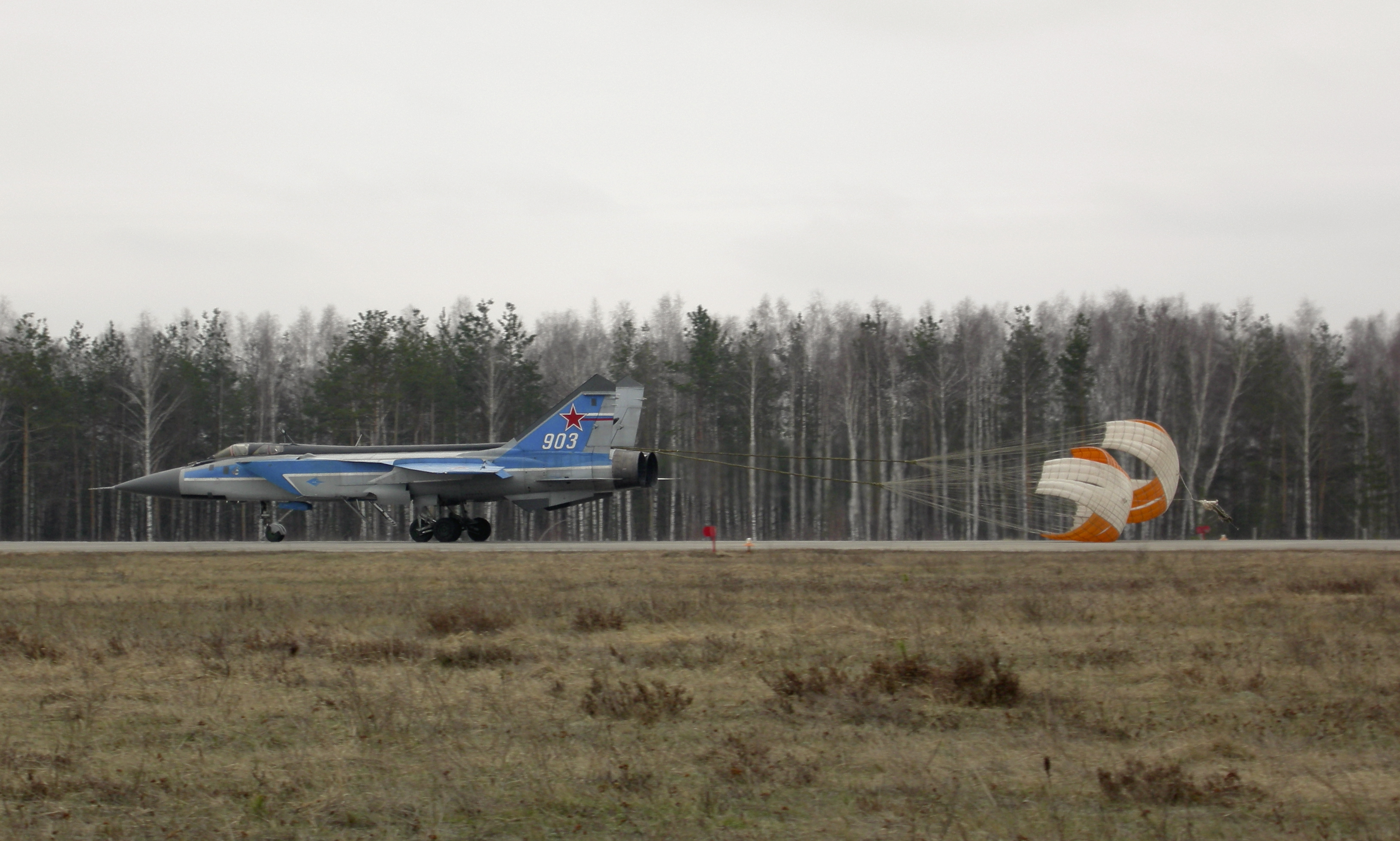
MiG-31E landing, with brake chute deployed

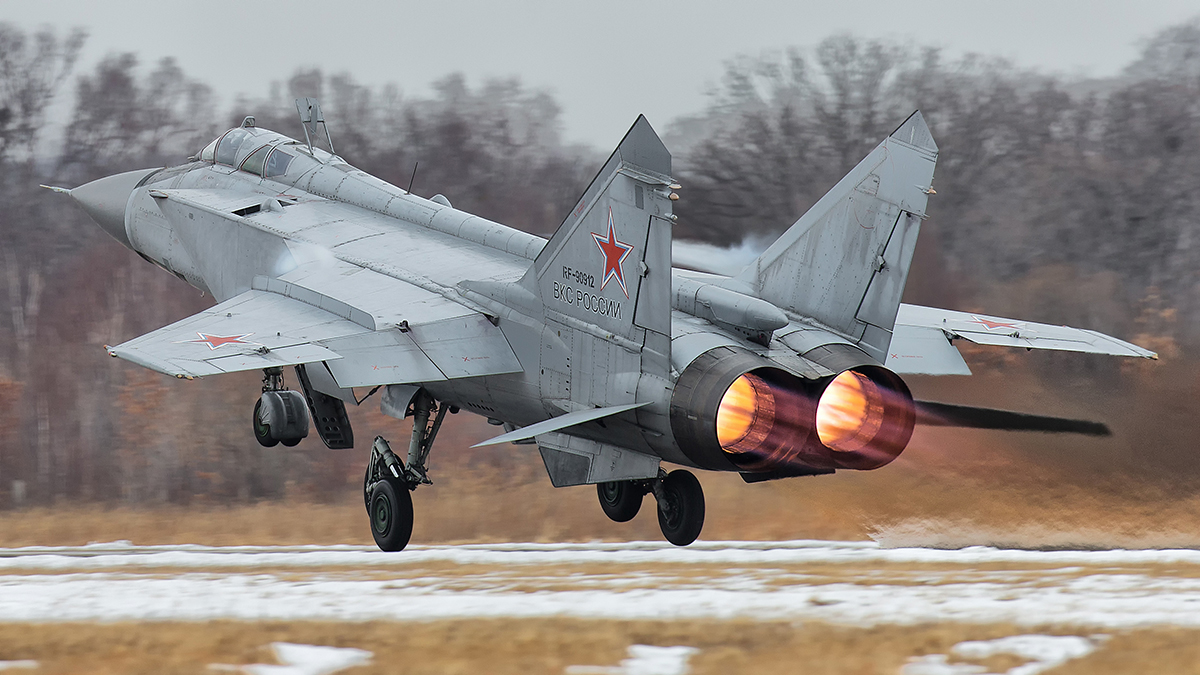
MiG-31BM take-off with afterburner

Data from Great Book of Modern Warplanes, Mikoyan, Combat Aircraft since 1945, airforce-technology.com, deagel.com

General characteristics

- Crew: 2 (pilot and weapons systems officer)
- Length: 22.62 m (74 ft 3 in)
- Wingspan: 13.456 m (44 ft 2 in)
- Height: 6.456 m (21 ft 2 in)
- Wing area: 61.6 m^{2} (663 sq ft)
- Empty weight: 21,820 kg (48,105 lb)
- Gross weight: 41,000 kg (90,390 lb)
- Max takeoff weight: 46,200 kg (101,854 lb)
- Fuel capacity: 35,550 lb (16,130 kg) internals, plus optional external fuel tanks
- Powerplant: 2 × Soloviev D-30F6 afterburning turbofan engines, 93 kN (21,000 lbf) thrust each dry, 152 kN (34,000 lbf) with afterburner

Performance

- Maximum speed: 3,000 km/h (1,900 mph, 1,600 kn) / Mach 2.83 at 21,500 m (70,500 ft)

1,500 km/h (930 mph; 810 kn) / Mach 1.23 at low altitude

- Cruise speed: 2,500 km/h (1,600 mph, 1,300 kn) / Mach 2.35
- Range: 3,000 km (1,900 mi, 1,600 nmi) with 4 × R-33E and 2 drop tanks

5,400 km (3,400 mi; 2,900 nmi) with 4 × R-33E and 2 drop tanks with one aerial refueling

- Combat range: 1,450 km (900 mi, 780 nmi) at Mach 0.8 and 10,000 m (33,000 ft)

720 km (450 mi; 390 nmi) at Mach 2.35 and 18,000 m (59,000 ft)

- Service ceiling: 25,000 m (82,000 ft) +
- g limits: 5+
- Rate of climb: 288 m/s (56,700 ft/min)
- Wing loading: 665 kg/m^{2} (136 lb/sq ft)
- Thrust/weight: 0.85

Armament

- Guns: 1 × 23 mm Gryazev-Shipunov GSh-6-23M rotary cannon with 260 rounds.
- Hardpoints: 4 × semi-recessed under the fuselage and 4 × underwing pylons with capacity of up to 9,000 kg (20,000 lb) of ordnance , with provisions to carry combinations of:
  - Missiles: Air-to-air missiles:
  - 4 × R-33
  - 2 × R-40RD/TD
  - 4 × R-60MK
  - 4 × R-73
  - 4 × R-77
  - 4 × R-37M (MiG-31BM only)
  - 4 × R-77M (MiG-31BM only)
- Air-to-surface missiles:
  - 4 × Kh-58UShKE anti-radiation missile
  - 1 × Kh-47M2 Kinzhal hypersonic air-launched ballistic missile

Avionics

- 8TK IRST
- Phazotron Zaslon passive electronically scanned array radar

== See also ==
- Firefox (novel) and Firefox (film), the premise of which is the theft of a speculated/fictional version of the MiG-31
- MiG-25 Foxbat, the predecessor to the MiG-31

Aircraft of comparable role, configuration, and era

- Grumman F-14 Tomcat
- McDonnell Douglas F-15 Eagle
- Panavia Tornado ADV
- Sukhoi Su-27
- Tupolev Tu-28

Related lists

- List of military aircraft of the Soviet Union and the CIS
