= R-33 (missile) =

- Diagram
- Type: Long range air-to-air missile
- Place of origin: Soviet Union

Specifications
- Mass: 490 kg (1,080 lb)
- Length: 4.14 m (13 ft 7 in)
- Diameter: 380 mm (15 in)
- Wingspan: 1.12 m (3 ft 8 in)
- Warhead: 47.5 kg (105 lb)
- Engine: solid fuel rocket
- Operational range: 120 km (75 mi) - 1981; 160 km (99 mi) - 1999; 304 km (189 mi) - 2012
- Maximum speed: Mach 4.5 (R-37)
- Guidance system: inertial and semi-active radar homing.

The R-33 (Russian: Вымпел Р-33, NATO reporting name: AA-9 Amos) is a long-range air-to-air missile developed by Vympel. It is the primary armament of the MiG-31 interceptor, intended to attack large high-speed targets such as the SR-71 Blackbird, the B-1 Lancer bomber, and the B-52 Stratofortress.

It uses a combination of inertial navigation for initial (midcourse) guidance, followed by semi-active radar homing once the target is within range of the radar seeker. The Zaslon phased array radar of MiG-31 allows six missiles to be guided simultaneously at separate targets.

The R-33 AAM remains in service with the CIS and Russian forces (See MiG-31 operators).

== Development ==
The history of the R-33 missile is tightly bound to the story of its launcher, the MiG-31. The development of the modernized MiG-25, E-155MP, was authorized by a governmental decision of 24 May 1968. There was a competition for future missiles for the E-155MP. Izdeliye 410 by "Vympel" of A.L.Lyapin won, while the K-50 by PKPK of M.R.Bisnovat lost. The missile was assigned the development name K-33, continuing the series of K-13 and K-23 missiles. The development was headed by vice-chief designer V.V.Zhuravlev and leading designer Y.K.Zakharov.

The R-33/MiG-31 missile/interceptor combination is similar to the earlier Bisnovat R-40/MiG-25 combination, although it is much more versatile and modern in that the MiG-25 was very heavily specialized for the interception of large supersonic targets such as the cancelled North American XB-70 Valkyrie bomber, and thus lacks maneuverability and is not suitable for air combat maneuvering. The MiG-31 is a much more versatile and capable aircraft and is still able to employ the older R-40.

Two prototypes were built in 1968, featuring nose-mounted manoeuvring fins and intended for carriage on underwing pylons, similar to the Bisnovat R-40 on board the MiG-25.

The draft project was completed in 1970 and progressed to testing using testbed aircraft. One of these was a converted early-production MiG-25 (aircraft P-10), and was used in 1972 for autonomous test launches from the upgraded APU-40 pylon. A MiG-21 (serial 76211524) was converted into the LL-21 testbed to test the missile seekers, while a Tu-104 jetliner (serial 42324) was converted into LL-104-518 (also known as LL-2) by NTK "Vzlet" to test the MFBU-410/"Zaslon" radar along with missile homing heads mounted on GVM-410 mockups. The space on board the passenger aircraft-based testbed allowed for the carriage of extensive diagnostic and support equipment.

The K-33 was evaluated with the RGS-33 SARH seeker and the TGS-33 IR seeker. Other candidates included active radar homing and dual IR/radar homing seekers. The final decision was made in favor of semi-active radar homing with an inertial initial stage. The homing device, designated MFBU-410 was developed by B.I.Ermakov under the supervision of Akopyan.

The missile design was significantly altered later in 1972. The seeker and warhead were enlarged, the span of the control fins was reduced from 1100 mm to 900 mm. Further, the mounting system was revised to include new under-fuselage slipper pylons, akin to the Phoenix mount on the American F-14, and the missile was reoriented, so it mounted with the fins cruciform rather than diagonal; the fins on the mounting (dorsal) side were made to fold to the side, to lie flush against the belly of the carrying aircraft. Consequently, the missile launch method also needed to be changed. Rather than launching directly from the mounting pylon, the redesigned missile used drop-launch, with the missile being jettisoned from the pylon on launch, and its rocket motor igniting on a time-delay.

A small run of one dummy (for launch system testing), 5 'programmed' (guidance and propulsion only, no warhead) and 8 fully functional trial missiles were built to the new design before the end of 1972. Of those 14, three were launched from the MiG-25P-10 testbed in 1973. Different warhead types (high explosive fragmentation and continuous-rod warhead) were evaluated, and tests of the radar and seeker systems were conducted on the LL-2. 1974 saw 11 more test launches from the MiG-25P-10, and the production of another 40 trial missiles. The first AKU-33 launchers and B-410 warheads were built. "Zaslon" tests continued at Akhtubinsk using the LL-2.

The first flight of the future MiG-31 (aircraft No.831) took place on 16 September 1975, with 12 more flights by the end of the year. The MiG-25P-10 testbed launched 20 more test missiles before being sent for its launchers to be upgraded, and the first telemetric missile launches from the LL-2 were carried out that year.

Development continued in 1976, including launches at PRM-2 parachute targets in April. Factory tests were completed in 1977 with 32 launches from the MiG-31 prototype, the first launch being against a MiG-17 drone on 26 March 1977). The guidance systems were improved during 1978, and the radar/missile combination performed a simultaneous launch at 4 targets in August.

State trials started in March 1979 using MiG-31 No.83210. They were successfully completed in 1980. A government decision on 6 May 1981 recommended R-33 into service.

== Variants ==
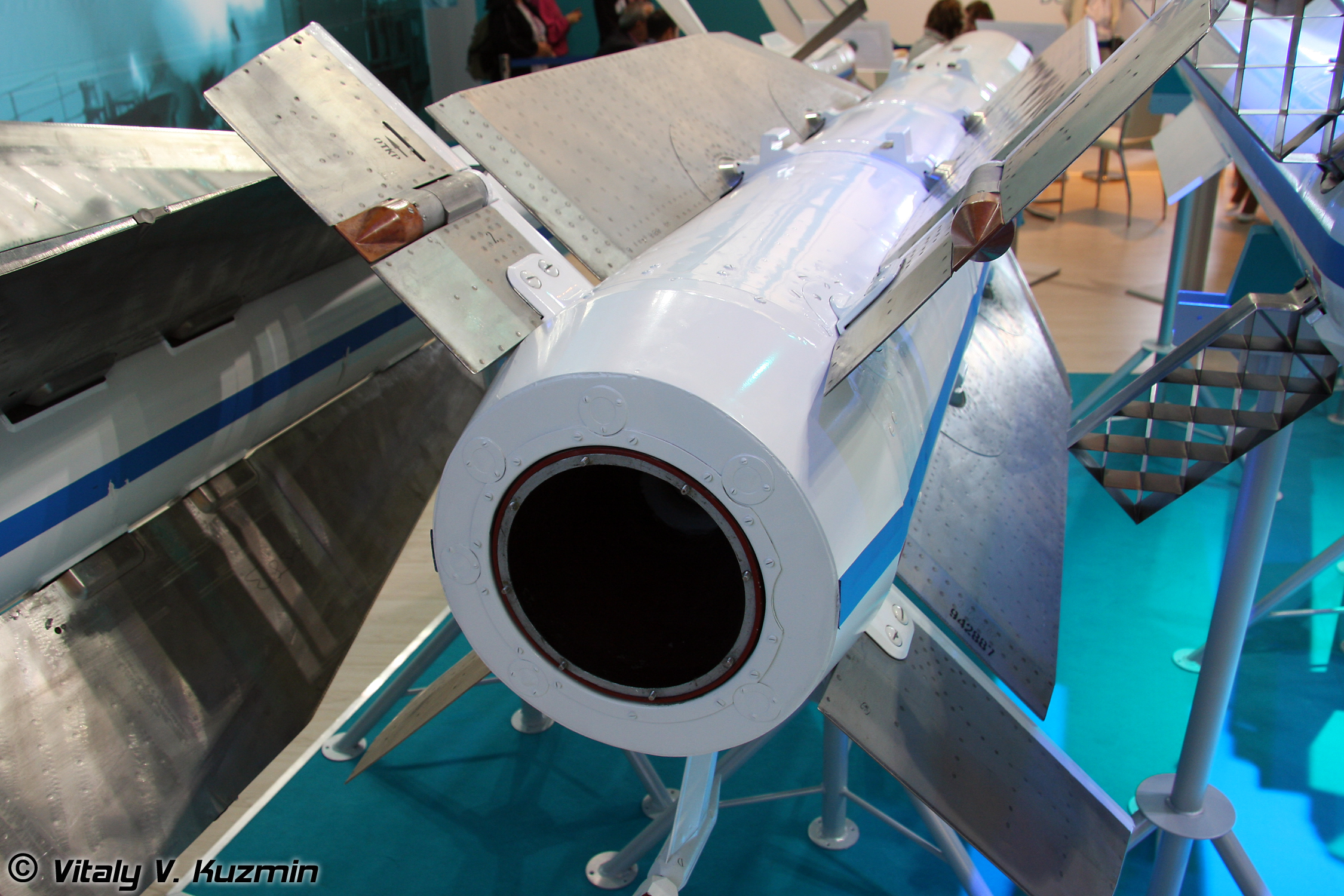
R-33E at MAKS

	R-33	R-33S	R-33E
Maximum launch range, km	120	160	160
Maximum flight speed, Mach	4.5	—	4.5
Length, mm	4250	—	4150
Maximum diameter of the missile body, mm	380	—	380
Wingspan, mm	900	—	900
Rudders span, mm	1180	—	1180
Launch mass, kg	491	—	490
Warhead mass, kg	55	—	47
Maximum overload of targets hit	8g	—	—
Maximum speed of the target, km / h	3700	—	—

R-33
Standard type.
R-33S
Improved version(nuclear-tipped warhead).
R-33E
Export version.
R-37
Further development of the R-33.

== Sources ==
- Gordon, Yefim (2004). Soviet/Russian Aircraft Weapons Since World War Two. Hinckley, England: Midland Publishing. ISBN 1-85780-188-1.
