= Kõue Manor =

Manor in Estonia

Coordinates: 59°5′48.99″N 25°14′24.41″E

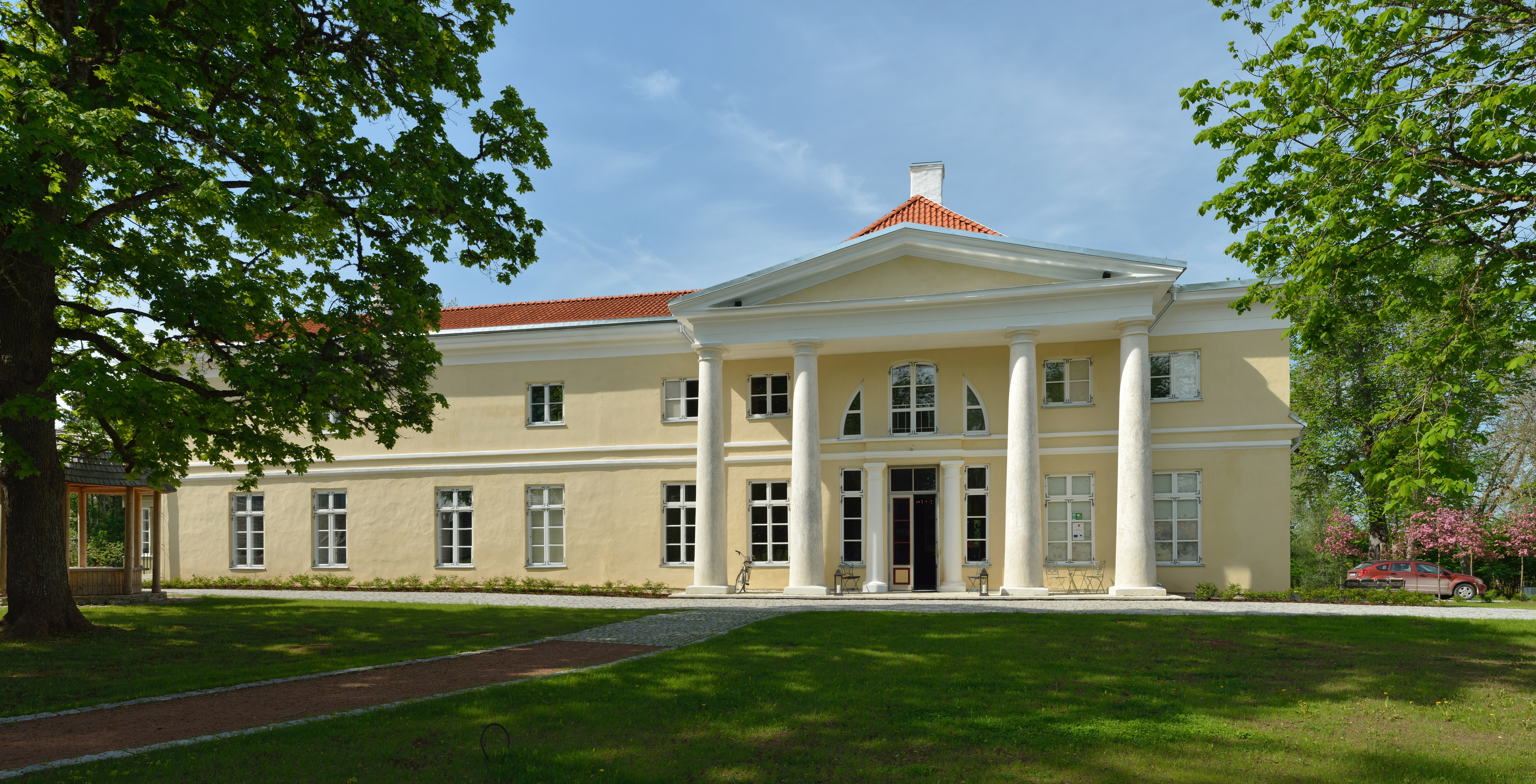
Main building

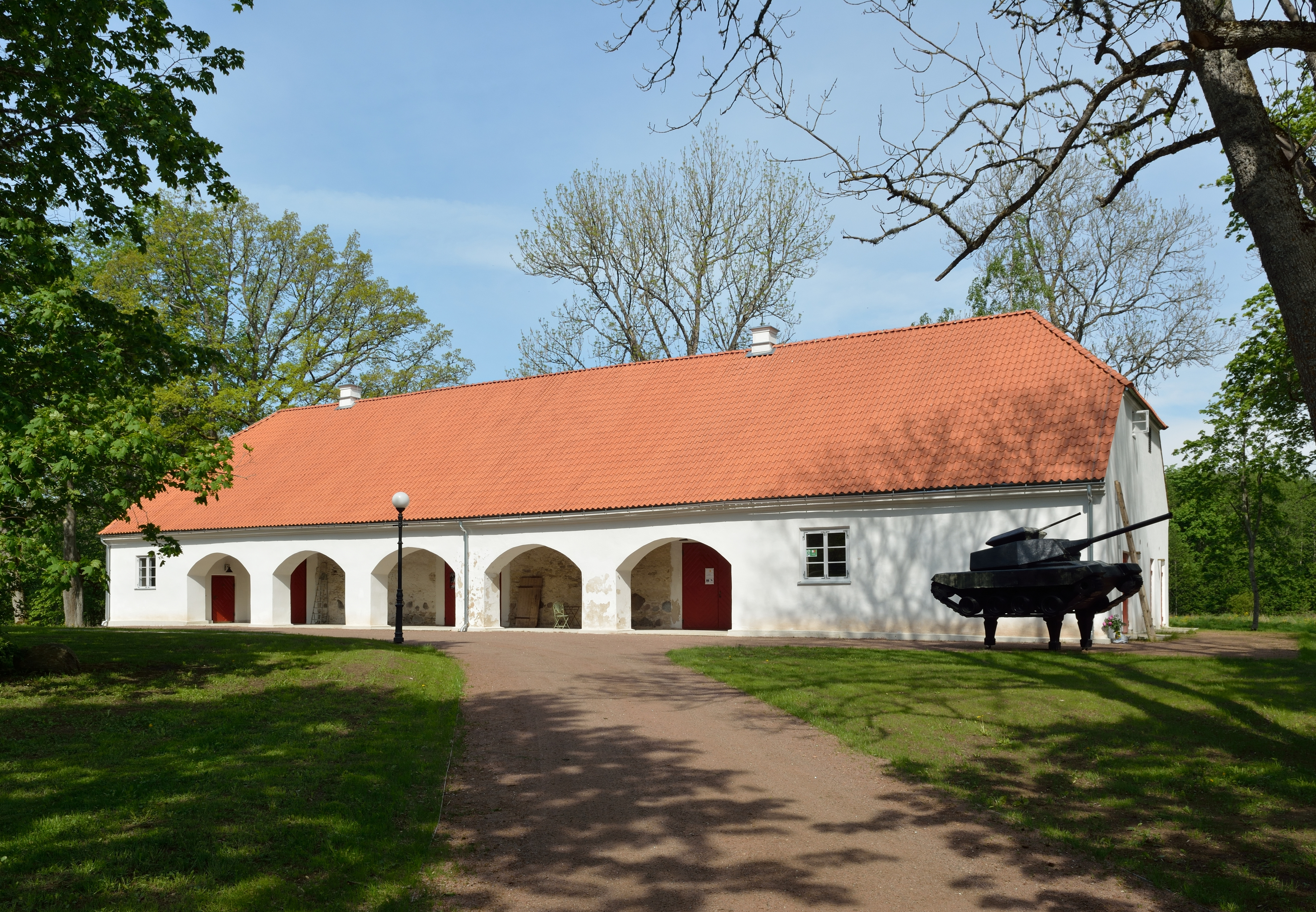
Stable-coach house

Kõue Manor (also Triigi Manor; Estonian: Kõue mõis; German: Kau) is a manor in Triigi, Kose Parish, Harju County, in northern Estonia.

== History ==
First mentioned in the Liber Census Daniae in 1241, the manor's thick and irregular walls suggest that the building was originally a medieval vassal stronghold.

The first known owner of the manor was a vassal of the Danish King Gerhardus de Kouwe (Gerhard from Kau) who served as the mayor of Kau in 1319. However, the fate of this family remains unknown as historical records indicate that Gerhardus might have participated in the failed 1343 uprising of St. George’s Night and lost the ownership of Manor during the suppression of the Estonians in the aftermath. However, Kau has been home to warriors, artists, explorers and statesmen ever since. A renowned warlord Heinrich Dücker owned Kau during the Livonian War in the 1560s. The Head of the Estonian Noble Corporation Tonnies Wrangell lived here at the end of the 16th century. In the early 19th century Kau was the home to a world-famous explorer, Otto von Kotzebue. In 1906 it became a by-manor of nearby Paunküla, owned by the von Hagemeister family. Triigi manor remained in their possession until its expropriation by the newly independent Republic of Estonia in 1919. In the 1920s and 1930s, Kau was owned by a War of Independence hero, the head of Estonian Military Intelligence Colonel Karl Laurits. In 1975, the house was abandoned and left to decay for several decades.

In 2006, Terje Kross and Eerik-Niiles Kross acquired the manor house. Although only a relic of its former self, Mary and Eerik were intrigued by the rich history of the place. Mary—an acclaimed filmmaker and artist—saw the manor's potential and committed herself to breathe new life into the house.

== Main building ==
The oldest part of the main building may date back to the medieval manor house, referring to thick infrequent walls. The main building was built in several stages between the 14th and 19th centuries. During the 17th and 18th centuries, the main building was ornamented with lavish Baroque decorations. The classical appearance of the main building has survived to the present day. Columns adorning both the façade and the right side of the main building extend through two floors and are crowned by flat triangle frontispieces.

Nowadays Kõue Manor is a private property and there is a luxurious hotel, restaurant and art center. In 2010 started with a big renovation that was ended in 2012.
