= Blonde Cobra =

1963 film by Ken Jacobs

- Directed by: Ken Jacobs
- Starring: Ken Jacobs, Jack Smith
- Cinematography: Bob Flieshner
- Distributed by: The Film-Makers' Cooperative
- Release date: April 29, 1963; (New York City)
- Running time: 33 minutes
- Country: United States
- Language: English

Blonde Cobra is a 1963 short film directed by experimental filmmaker Ken Jacobs. Footage for the film was shot by Bob Flieshner. The film is meant to be accompanied by the presence of a live radio during the screening. The film's title was derived from two of Jack Smith's favorite movies, Blonde Venus and Cobra Woman.

Jacobs once described the film as a "look in on an exploding life, on a man of imagination suffering prefashionable Lower East Side deprivation and consumed with American 1950s, '40s, '30s disgust." The film premiered on a double-bill with Flaming Creatures at midnight on April 29, 1963, at the Bleecker Street Cinema in New York City.

== Plot ==
The film captures Jack Smith wearing dresses and makeup, playing with dolls, and smoking marijuana. Paul Arthur writes that the film contains "dizzying quasi-autobiographical rants" which spin on sadism, and that like Jacobs' Little Stabs at Happiness, it contains "languid improvisations studded with the bare bones of narrative incident or, more accurately, its collapse". The film contains Smith droning and singing and wildly cooing and cackling in parts of the film. The "lonely little boy" episode about a little boy living in a large house with 10 rooms has been cited as being "potentially repugnant to many viewers" because of its exploration of sadism against children and childhood sexuality. In this episode the narrator confesses to have "blown up the penis" of a 7-year-old boy with a match.

The film contains numerous other elements which were shocking at the time of release such as references to necrophilia, the use of the word "cunt", the confession of a nun (impersonated in a posh high-pitched voice by Smith) to lesbianism, the holding of a giant would-be dildo, and a portrayal of transvestites. The film features quotes such as "Why shave when I can't think of a reason for living" and "life is a sad business", quoting Greta Garbo. "Let's Call the Whole Thing Off" is then played, described as a "burlesque rendering" of Robert Siodmak's 1944 film Cobra Woman. In another explicit scene, Smith shows his bared buttocks to the camera with a butcher knife handle placed to appear to be protruding from his stabbed anus while he bellows in voice-over: "Sex is a pain in the ass. Sex IS a pain in the ass." Hilary Radner and Moya Luckett consider the film to be a camp portrayal of Rose Hobart.

The film ends with Smith chanting: "A mother's wisdom had dragged me down to this! a crummy loft! a life of futility! hunger! despair!" He then puts a toy gun to his head, with the image of a graveyard in the background; he collapses to the floor with a title card behind that says "Fin". As the film runs out, Smith is heard wailing: "What went wrong? What went wrong? What went wrong?", which presumably refers both to his surviving of a suicide attempt, and the end of the film.

== Cast ==
- Ken Jacobs
- Jack Smith

== Background and production ==
Ken Jacobs made the film out of the surviving footage of two parodies of Hollywood movies shot in the late 1950s that had been abandoned by his friends Bob Fleischner and Jack Smith. The film borrows from various artistic influences, including: the "disruptive techniques" of Bertolt Brecht; John Cage's "embrace of chance operations and indeterminacy"; and Marcel Duchamp's transformation of everyday objects into art. The film's title was derived from two of Smith's favorite movies, Blonde Venus and Cobra Woman.

Jacobs also drafted a set of instructions that were distributed with the film, stipulating that, at specific moments during the film's broadcast, the soundtrack was to be interrupted by a live radio broadcast, to supplement the film's soundtrack. The film projectionist would be prompted by a visual signal shortly after the film began, "to dial in scratches of mostly talk, any kind". The projectionist also looked for additional visual cues within the film, so they would know when to raise and lower the radio's volume or to turn it on and off. Jacobs's instructions were designed to imbue each screening with "elements of chance and singularity", ensuring that, in Jacob's words, the film always "happens when you watch it, happens wherever and whenever it plays".

== Reception ==
Filmmaker Jonas Mekas said, "Blonde Cobra, undoubtedly, is the masterpiece of the Baudelairean cinema, and it is a work hardly surpassable in perversity, in richness, in beauty, in sadness, in tragedy. I think it is one of the great works of personal cinema, so personal that it is ridiculous to talk about." Author Paul Arthur described the film as a "do-it-yourself movie kit whose elements no sane viewer could ever assemble coherently; it resists our every effort at connection or expectation, yet, implausibly, it draws us into a lush world of dark liberties".

British author Tony Rayns said the film "lives up to its reputation as an anarchic masterpiece; Smith crowds the images, and his crazed monologues monopolise the soundtrack; much of the soundtrack's monologues is accompanied only by a blank screen; Blonde Cobra is panic-stricken, funny, and ultimately life affirming." Film scholar David E. James opined that the film "is significant not only for the various formal strategies it employs; the hand-written titles, the cluttered sets and tight framing, the dress-ups and exotic costumes, but also for the way its cult sensibility actively remakes and transforms the outmoded cultural products of the declining Hollywood studio system as objects of playful allusion, often invested with gay subcultural resonance."

Author Marc Siegel states that the film is "generally considered to be one of the masterpieces of the New York underground film scene", and that it is a "fascinating audio-visual testament to the tragicomic performance of the inimitable Jack Smith." P. Adams Sitney wrote: "Jacobs insists upon the idea of a film as a dying organism; the film breaks down before it can get started; with his monumentally angular countenance and movie-star-bright pompadour, Smith is the film's Blonde Cobra; he glows like Jennifer Jones on her beatific Bernadette sick-trip: frail, radiant, hysterical, asthmatic, inspired, innocent and utterly ravished."

Film scholar Ruth Perlmutter wrote that "the narrative and theme of the film was discontinuous; unsynchronized sound, fast cutting interspersed with black leader and long, endurance-testing passages, served to disorient with alternative shock and boredom; but behind the apparent formlessness there were a number of unities – place, characters, imagery; these constants were a juxtaposition of a soundtrack of nonsense and manic, existential despair with garish circus-like color, urban settings, and a pre-Warhol satirization of Hollywood eroticism."

== See also ==
- Experimental film
- List of American films of 1963
- List of LGBTQ-related films of 1963
- Jack Smith and the Destruction of Atlantis
