= List of LGBTQ-related films of 1963 =

This is a list of lesbian, gay, bisexual, transgender or queer-related films released in 1963. It contains theatrically released films that deal with important gay, lesbian, bisexual, transgender or queer characters or issues and may have same-sex romance or relationships as a plot device.

== Films ==
Title	Director	Country	Genre	Cast	Notes
À tout prendre	Claude Jutra	Canada	Drama	Claude Jutra, Johanne Harrelle	Jutra and Harrelle play fictionalized versions of themselves
An Actor's Revenge	Kon Ichikawa	Japan	Drama	Kazuo Hasegawa, Fujiko Yamamoto, Ayako Wakao, Raizō Ichikawa, Shintarō Katsu, Eiji Funakoshi, Chūsha Ichikawa, Narutoshi, Nakamura Ganjirō II, Saburō Date, Eijirō Yanagi	Based on the novel by Otokichi Mikami
The Balcony	Joseph Strick	United States	Drama	Shelley Winters, Peter Falk, Leonard Nimoy, Ruby Dee and Lee Grant	Co-written by Jean Genet, based on his play of the same name
Blonde Cobra	Ken Jacobs	United States	Experimental, short	Ken Jacobs, Jack Smith	
Blow Job	Andy Warhol	United States	Short	DeVeren Bookwalter	
Flaming Creatures	Jack Smith	United States	Experimental	Piero Heliczer	
The Haunting	Robert Wise	United States	Horror, thriller	Julie Harris, Claire Bloom, Richard Johnson and Russ Tamblyn	Based on the novel The Haunting of Hill House by Shirley Jackson
Scorpio Rising	Kenneth Anger	United States	Short	Ernie Allo, Bruce Byron, Frank Carifi, Steve Crandell, Johnny Dodds, Bill Dorfman, Nelson Leigh, John Palone, Barry Rubin and Johnny Sapienza	
The Silence	Ingmar Bergman	Sweden	Drama	Ingrid Thulin, Gunnel Lindblom, Birger Malmsten, Håkan Jahnberg and Jörgen Lindström	
Twice a Man	Gregory J. Markopoulos	United States	Avant-garde, drama	Olympia Dukakis, Paul Kilb, Gerard Malanga, Violet Roditi and Albert Torgessen	
