= Darino =

Darino is a surname. Notable people with the surname include:

- Eduardo Darino (born 1944), Uruguayan film producer, director, animator, and cartoonist
- Siro Darino (born 1976), Argentine footballer

== See also ==
- Darini
- Marino (name)
