= Tom, Tom, the Piper's Son (film) =

- Directed by: Ken Jacobs
- Distributed by: The Film-Makers' Cooperative
- Release date: 1969
- Running time: 86 minutes (1969 version)
- Country: United States
- Language: Silent

Tom, Tom, the Piper's Son is a 1969 American experimental film made by Ken Jacobs. It was made by rephotographing a 1905 film of the same name, directed by G. W. "Billy" Bitzer and released by Biograph. In 2007, the film was selected for preservation in the National Film Registry by the Library of Congress. Jacobs continued to revisit and rework the Biograph film, through film performances in the 1970s and 1980s and through the use of digital technologies in the 2000s.

== Background ==
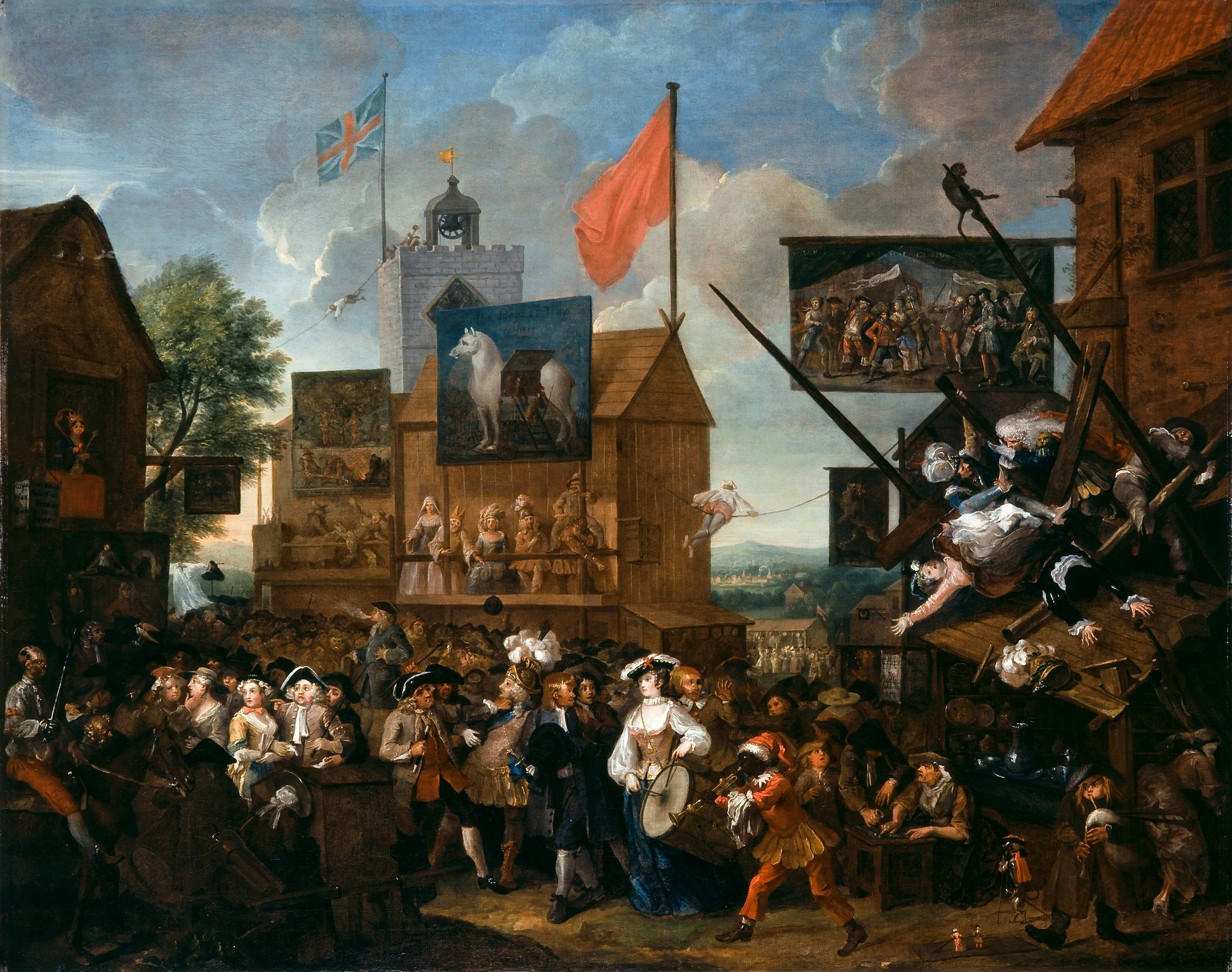
William Hogarth's Southwark Fair (1733)

Ken Jacobs began as a painter before becoming a filmmaker. His work was influenced by that of Hans Hofmann, under whom he studied during the 1950s. Jacobs began shooting films in 1956, working closely with Jack Smith until the dissolution of their partnership during the 1960s. Jacobs's work during this initial period was typified by his eccentric, lyrical short films. After the completion of his 1965 film The Sky Socialist, he shifted away from collaborations with actors.

The 1905 film Tom, Tom, the Piper's Son, which Jacobs used to create his own film, is a silent comedy short film directed by Billy Bitzer and released by the Biograph Company. Its plot is based on "Tom, Tom, the Piper's Son", an English nursery rhyme. In it, a boy named Tom goes to a village fair with his friend. The two steal a pig and are pursued by the villagers until they are caught and arrested. The Biograph film presents the story through several tableaux. The first of these establishes the setting as a fair recreating William Hogarth's painting Southwark Fair.

== Description ==
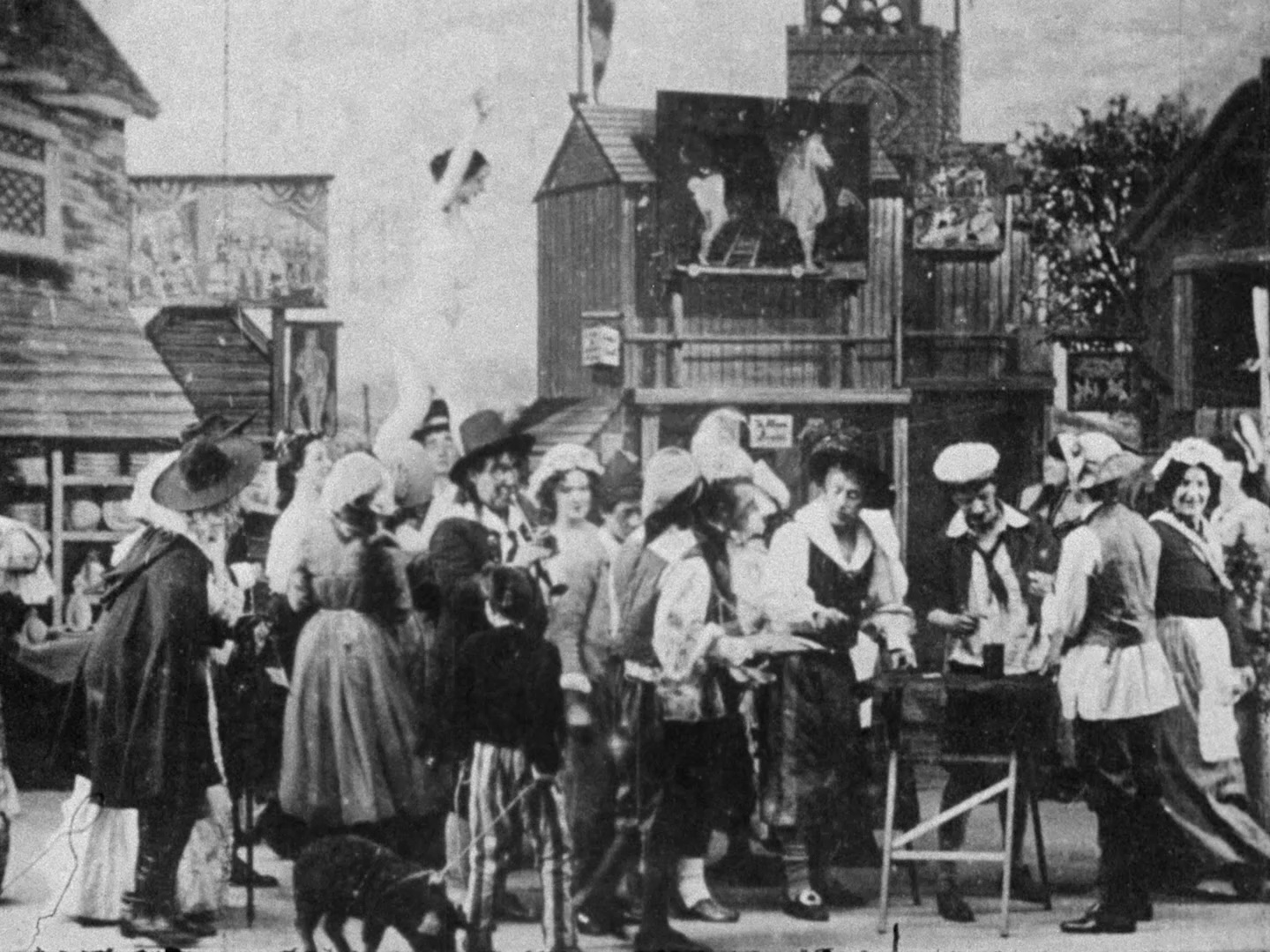
The 1969 film uses the 1905 film of the same name as its source material.

The film begins with the original Biograph film, shown unaltered in its entirety. The majority of the film consists of a section in which the source material is rephotographed. It moves through each of the tableaux from the Biograph film, although not all of the footage reappears and images are reordered without preserving narrative continuity. Fragments of the footage are frozen, slowed, or looped to distend and magnify small details. After the main section, the Biograph film is again presented in its original form. It ends with a short epilogue in which the screen is divided vertically. This section presents still and moving images from a moment of the film, next to solid black or white and flickering patterns.

Projection instructions for the film direct the projectionist to let the entire film strip run through the projector, leave the bulb on and the reel spinning for 20–30 seconds, shut the projector off entirely, and finally leave the cinema in darkness and silence for an additional 20–30 seconds.

== Production ==
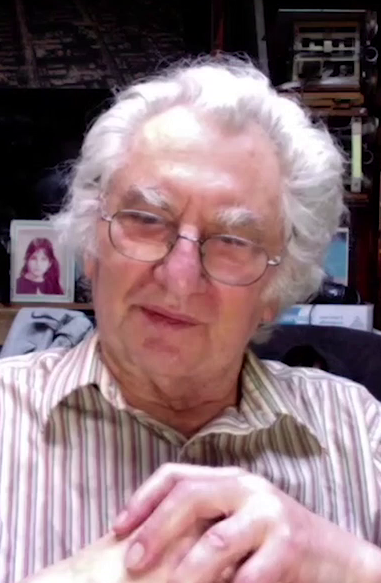
Ken Jacobs in 2021

Preservationist Kemp Niver restored early silent films by transferring paper prints from the Library of Congress to 16 mm reels which he could distribute. In 1968, Jacobs read about a screening by Niver at the Museum of Modern Art, in a New York Times article by Vincent Canby. He rented a print to show his students at St. John's University. The reel included Tom, Tom, the Piper's Son, The Suburbanite (1904), and An Acadian Elopement (1907). Jacobs was unfamiliar with the nursery rhyme on which the Biograph film is based. Because of its dense visual composition, he did not notice the pig being stolen and was left confused why the chase was happening. Only after many viewings did he notice that a pig was present in the scene.

Jacobs worked with his friend Jordan Meyers to rephotograph the Biograph film at his home. Using a Victor Animatograph projector, Jacobs projected the original film onto a translucent screen. He or Meyers then recorded images off the screen, shooting with a handheld Arriflex 16 mm camera. Jacobs first presented unfinished versions of the film in private screenings. He added a color sequence resembling a shadow play as well as a section where the image moves vertically due to the film strip jumping in the projector gate.

== Analysis ==
Jacobs's use of abstraction adopts Hofmann's "push and pull" spatial theories. Byron Davies suggests that its engagement with the filmic surface extends Hofmann's aesthetic model by enacting interactions between the two-dimensional surface and the recessive space it depicts.

Regina Cornwell examines Jacobs's conspicuous use of techniques such as slow motion, wipes, dissolves, masking, flicker, and afterimages to transform the source material and draw the viewer's attention to the filmmaking process. She likens its production to painters who developed their own renditions of prior works, specifically comparing it to Picasso's variations on Manet's Le Déjeuner sur l'herbe and Cézanne's reimagining of Titian's The Bacchanal of the Andrians.

Abigail Child notes that Jacobs's focus on the human form was unique within the structural film movement.

== Release ==
Tom, Tom, the Piper's Son premiered in 1969 at the Huntington Hartford Gallery of Modern Art, as part of a program presented by Jonas Mekas. Jacobs distributed it through the Film-Makers' Cooperative. In 1971, he worked with Judy Dauterman to negative match the 1969 version and revised it during the editing process, with the addition of a new section.

Re:Voir released Tom, Tom, the Piper's Son on PAL VHS in 2000. This version, transferred from a 35 mm print from the Museum of Modern Art, is missing a scene from the original version. The film was released on DVD in 2002 by Re:frame. To accommodate the NTSC frame rate, this version is slower and lasts 133 minutes. Kino Lorber included the film as part of the 2021 Ken Jacobs Collection Vol. 1 on Blu-ray.

== Reception and legacy ==
When the film screened at the Whitney Museum in 1972, New York Times reviewer Roger Greenspun wrote, "Except for the old movie material itself, the film is devoid of charm; and on the scale of technical bravado it is now regularly surpassed by the work of baby filmmakers." Mekas responded in defense of the film, which he called "one of the masterpieces of modern cinema…a most rigorously and subtly executed meditation on another, very early film". Critic Stuart Byron considered Tom, Tom, the Piper's Son "one of the most important American films of recent years", describing it as an analysis of the history of film techniques that had been developed since the early 1900s.

The film is considered a landmark in avant-garde cinema. It was inducted to the National Film Registry in 2007, and is part of Anthology Film Archives' Essential Cinema Repertory collection. Bill Morrison, who is known for his work with archival material, credited Tom, Tom, the Piper's Son with sparking his interest in the Paper Print Collection.

Jacobs continued to revisit and rework the original 1905 film through subsequent projects. Three of his Nervous System performances used footage from it: The Impossible: Chapter One, Southwark Fair (1975), The Impossible: Chapter Three, Hell Breaks Loose (1980), and The Impossible: Chapter Four, Schilling (1980).

The visual effects of the telecine process when digitizing Tom, Tom, the Piper's Son served as inspiration for Jacobs's 2002 film A Tom Tom Chaser. In 2008, he released the anaglyph 3D film Anaglyph Tom (Tom with Puffy Cheeks). Return to the Scene of the Crime, also released in 2008, focuses on only the first shot of the Biograph film.

== See also ==
- List of American films of 1969
- 1905 in film
- Metafilm

== Bibliography ==
- Bordwell, David (1997). On the History of Film Style. Harvard University Press. ISBN 978-0-674-63428-2.
- Eagan, Daniel (2010). America's Film Legacy: The Authoritative Guide to the Landmark Movies in the National Film Registry. Continuum Publishing. ISBN 978-0-8264-1849-4.
- Habib, André (2018). "Drafts and Fragments: Reflections around Bill Morrison and the Paper Print Collection". In Herzogenrath, Bernd (ed.). The Films of Bill Morrison. Amsterdam University Press. ISBN 978-90-8964-996-6.
- Habib, André (2020). "Finding Early Cinema in the Avant-Garde". In Bernardi, Joanne; Cherchi Usai, Paolo; Williams, Tami; Yumibe, Joshua (eds.). Provenance and Early Cinema. Indiana University Press. ISBN 978-0-253-05299-5.
- MacDonald, Scott (2015). Binghamton Babylon: Voices from the Cinema Department, 1967–1977. SUNY Press. ISBN 978-1-4384-5889-2.
- Pierson, Michele; James, David E.; Arthur, Paul, eds. (2011). Optic Antics: The Cinema of Ken Jacobs. Oxford University Press. ISBN 978-0-19-538497-0.
- Sitney, P. Adams (1970). "Structural Film". In Sitney, P. Adams (ed.). Film Culture Reader. Praeger Publishing. ISBN 978-0-8154-1101-7.
- Sitney, P. Adams (1974). Visionary Film: The American Avant-Garde. Oxford University Press. ISBN 978-0-19-501761-8.
