= Orchard Street =

Street in Manhattan, New York

Coordinates: 40°43′21″N 73°59′17″W

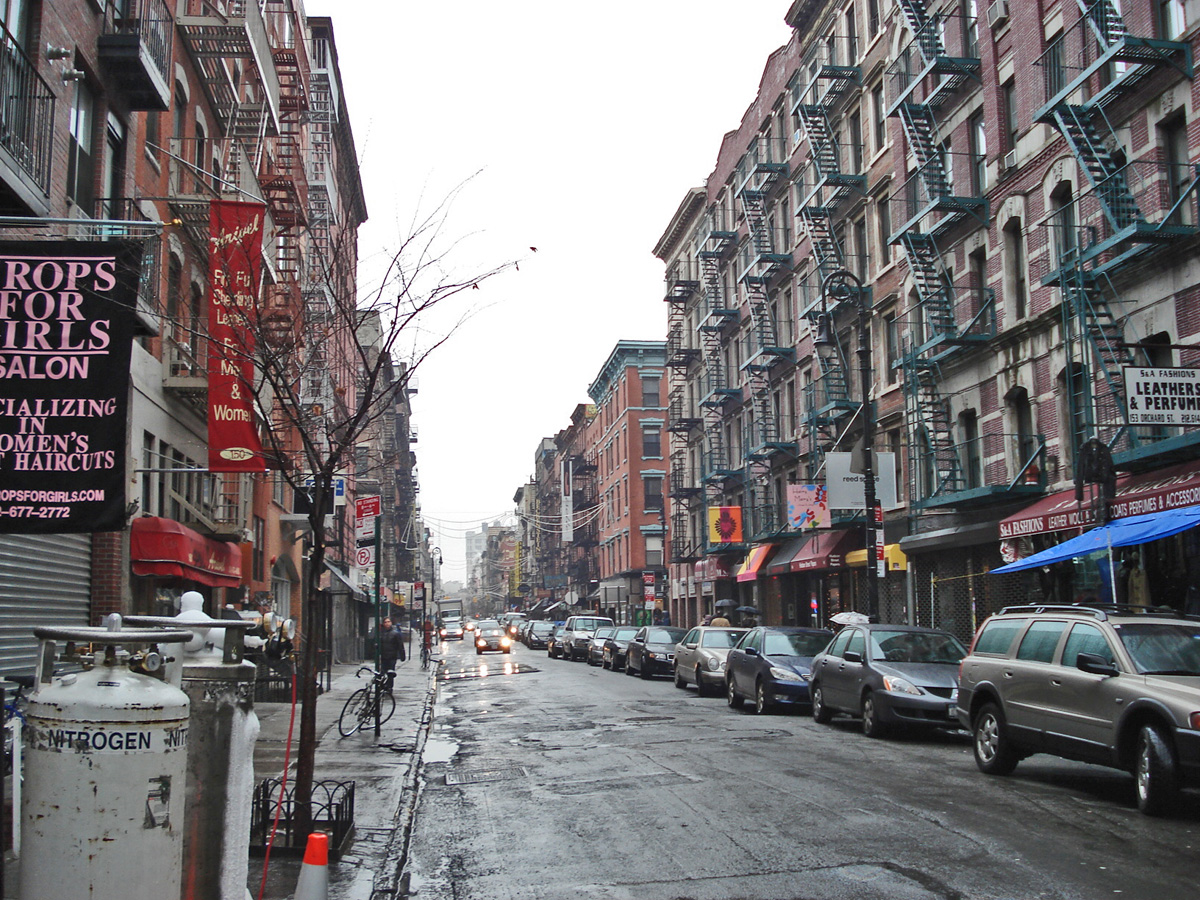
Orchard Street between Stanton and Rivington Streets, looking south, in 2008

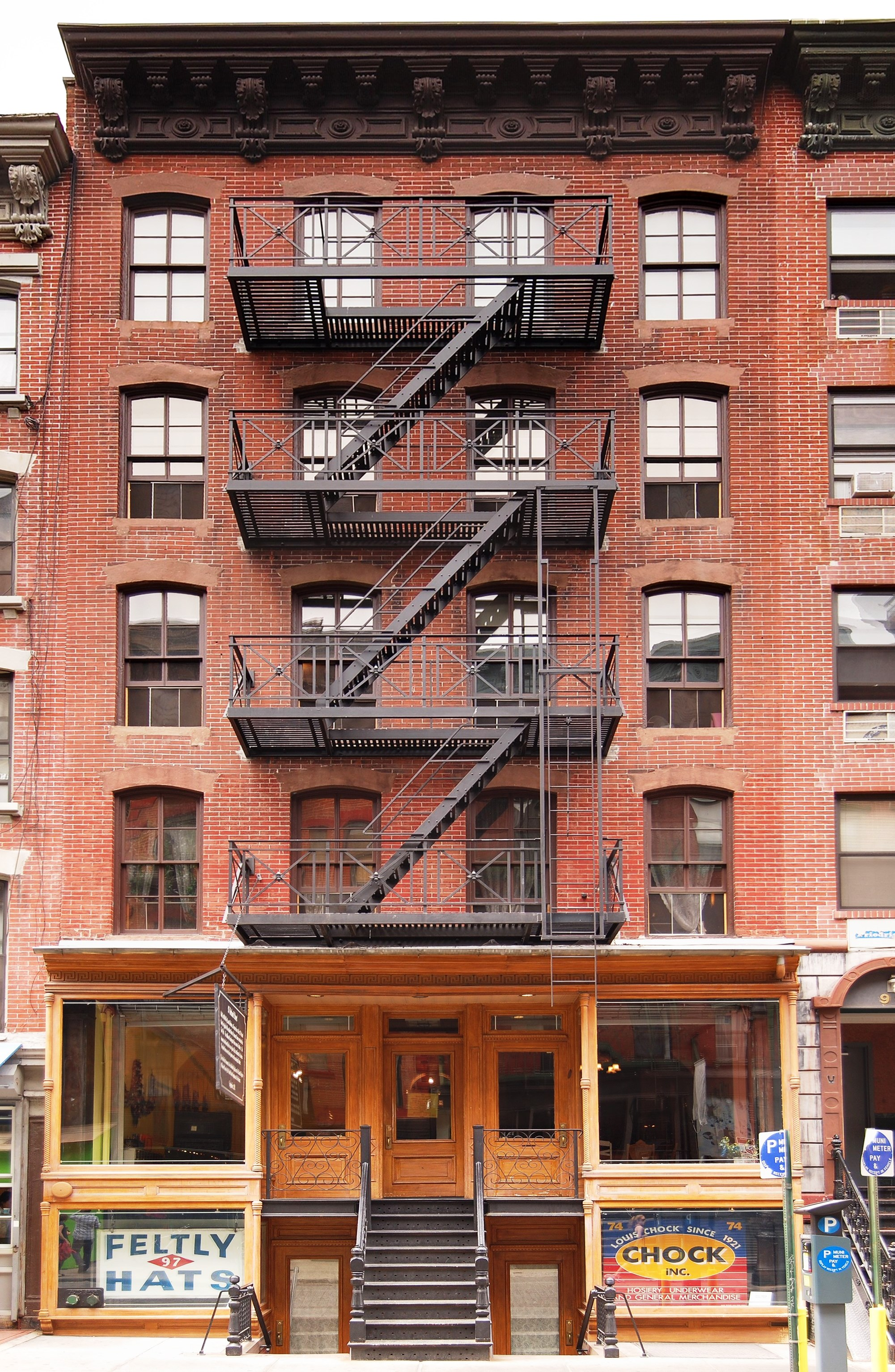
The Lower East Side Tenement Museum

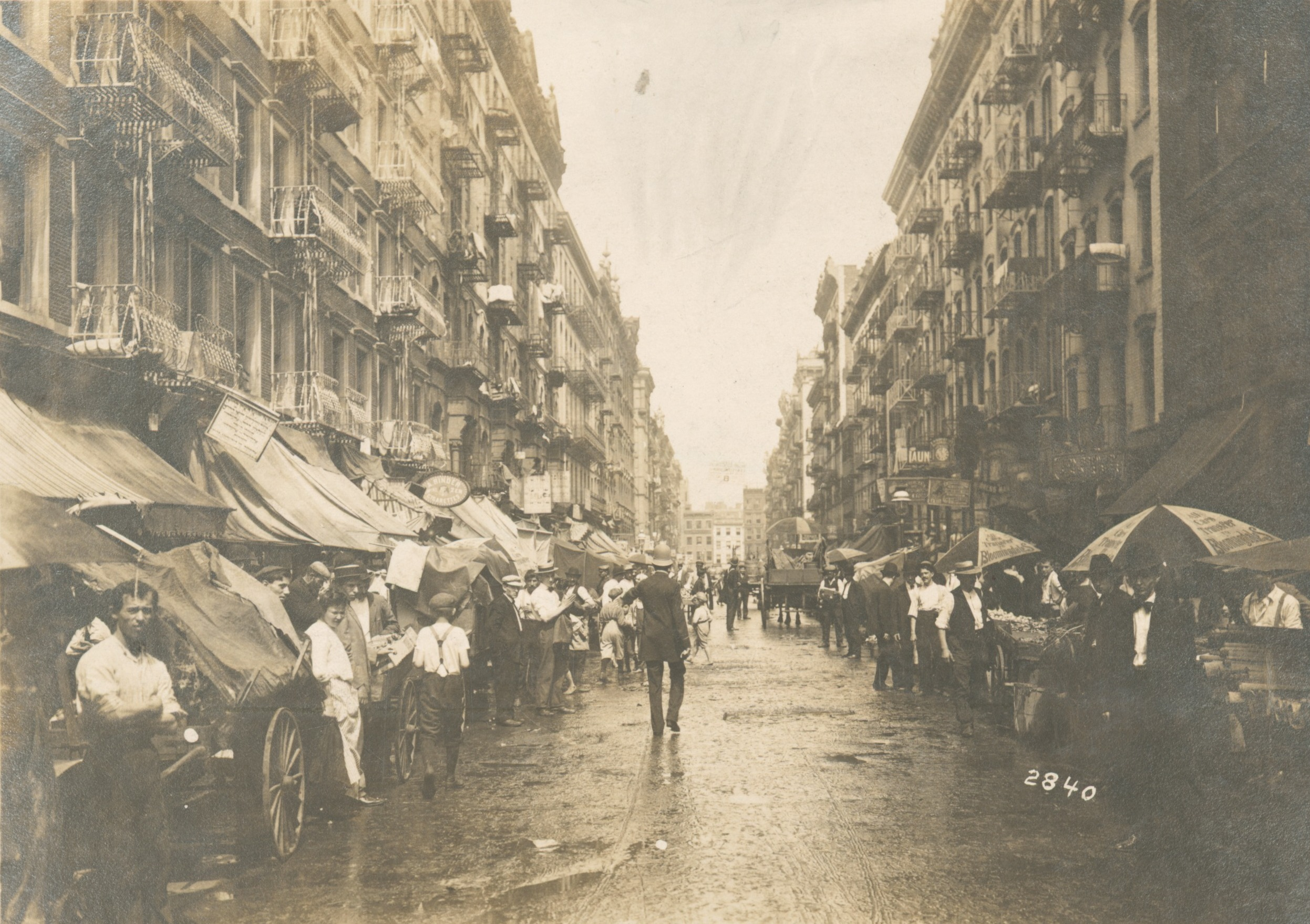
Orchard Street in the late 19th century, seen from Rivington Street

Orchard Street is a street in Manhattan which covers the eight city blocks between Division Street in Chinatown and East Houston Street on the Lower East Side. Vehicular traffic runs north on this one-way street. Orchard Street starts from Division Street in the south and ends at East Houston Street in the north.

== History ==
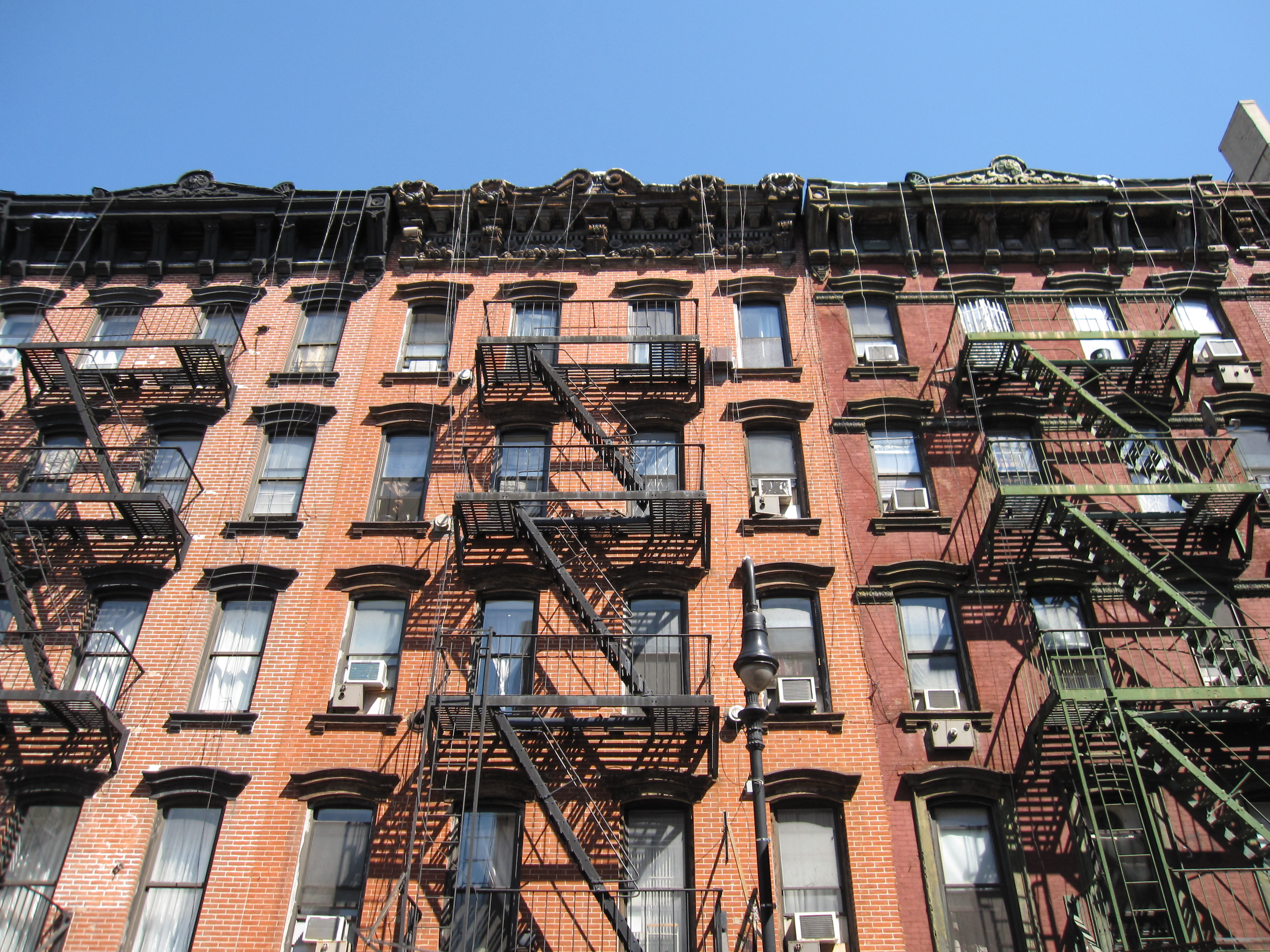
Close-up of tenement houses on Orchard

The orchard in question belonged to James Delancey, who returned to England in 1775, and his farm was declared forfeit.

Orchard Street is often considered the center of the Lower East Side and is lined end to end almost entirely with low-rise tenement buildings with the iconic brick face and fire escapes. First part of Little Germany and later a Jewish enclave, the neighborhood has been home to immigrants from the mid-19th century to the present day. The street's past as the heart of the immigrant experience is captured at the Lower East Side Tenement Museum's centerpiece, the restored 97 Orchard Street tenement.

Like the rest of the Lower East Side, Orchard Street has gone through gentrification in the past decade, especially above Rivington Street, where boutiques and upscale restaurants have opened shop.

The transition has been slower on the lower end of the street, especially below Grand Street, which is part of Chinatown's industrial east end, but new restaurants, bars and art galleries have opened in this area in recent years as well.

Meanwhile, several luxury condominiums now stand or are under construction where immigrant families once shared quarters in cramped tenement buildings. Several boutique hotels have also sprouted in the area, including the Blue Moon Hotel at 100 Orchard St.

Many days of the week and every Sunday, Orchard Street from Delancey to East Houston Street closes to vehicular traffic turning the street into a pedestrian mall with stores setting up tables and racks advertising their wares to passersby.

== Garment history and fashion ==
The street has a long history of merchants manufacturing and selling clothes. In the nineteenth century, the Levine family worked with a single sewing machine to produce garments that would be sold to stores. Through the twentieth century, different immigrant groups including Jewish and Asian immigrants continued to make a living in the garment industry. Despite increasing rent prices in the early 21st century, a few older stores have remained in business alongside a surge in high-end fashion boutiques. This has led to the presence of longstanding businesses next to relatively new stores.

== In popular culture ==
A short film, Orchard Street, was made in 1955 by Ken Jacobs, who used his new 16mm Bell & Howell camera to capture the life of the street one afternoon. Turner Classic Movies has shown it as an avant garde film.

Lower East Side resident and filmmaker Courtney Fathom Sell made Down Orchard Street over the course of four years. The documentary depicts the evictions suffered by many of the store-owners due to continuing gentrification of the neighborhood.

In the musical Ragtime the Latvian immigrant known as Tateh references the corner of Orchard and Rivington, where he makes a living creating silhouettes, in the song "Success": "With ordinary paper, a pair of scissors and some glue I will give you a thing of such beauty!"

== Notable places ==
- The Blue Moon Hotel, 100 Orchard Street
- Lower East Side Tenement Museum, 97 Orchard Street
- Orchard Street Runners, 36 Ludlow Street (formerly 45 Orchard Street)
- Scarr's Pizza, 22 Orchard Street
- Shin Gallery, 68 Orchard Street
