= Manohla Dargis =

American film critic

- Born: Manohla June Dargis
- Education: State University of New York, Purchase (BA); New York University (MA)
- Occupation: Film critic
- Spouse: Lou Amdur (m. 1994)

Manohla June Dargis (/məˈnoʊlə ˈdɑːrɡɪs/ mə-NOH-lə DAR-ghiss) is an American film critic. She is the chief film critic for The New York Times. She is a five-time finalist for the Pulitzer Prize for Criticism.

== Career ==
Before being a film critic for The New York Times, Dargis was a lead film critic for the Los Angeles Times, the film editor at the LA Weekly, and a film critic at The Village Voice, where she had two columns on avant-garde cinema ("CounterCurrents" and "Shock Corridor"). She has been a contributor to anthologies including Women and Film: A Sight and Sound Reader, published by Scarlet Press, and American Movie Critics: An Anthology from the Silents Until Now, published by the Library of America. She wrote a monograph on Curtis Hanson's film L.A. Confidential for the British Film Institute and served as the president and vice-president of the Los Angeles Film Critics Association.

In 2012, Dargis received the Nelson A. Rockefeller Award for contributions to the arts from Purchase College. She was also a finalist for the Pulitzer Prize for Criticism in 2013, 2015, 2016, 2018, and 2019.

== Preferences ==
=== Favorites ===
Dargis participated in the 2012 Sight & Sound Greatest Films of All Time, where she listed her 10 favorite films:

- Au hasard Balthazar (France, 1966)
- Barry Lyndon (USA, 1975)
- Flowers of Shanghai (Taiwan, 1998)
- The Flowers of St. Francis (Italy, 1950)
- The Godfather Part II (USA, 1974)
- Little Stabs at Happiness (USA, 1959-1963)
- Masculin Féminin (France, 1966)
- There Will Be Blood (USA, 2007)
- Touch of Evil (USA, 1958)
- The Wizard of Oz (USA, 1939)

For the 2022 edition of the Sight & Sound poll Dargis' ballot included:

- Au hasard Balthazar (France, 1966)
- The Gleaners and I (France, 2000)
- Flowers of Shanghai (Taiwan, 1998)
- Tokyo Story (Japan, 1953)
- The Godfather Part II (USA, 1974)
- Little Stabs at Happiness (USA, 1959-1963)
- Killer of Sheep (USA, 1977)
- There Will Be Blood (USA, 2007)
- All My Life (USA, 1966)
- Black Girl (Senegal, 1965)

=== New York Times Best of the Year ===
- 2004 – Million Dollar Baby
- 2005 – A History of Violence
- 2006 – Army of Shadows
- 2007 – There Will Be Blood
- 2008 – Happy-Go-Lucky
- 2015 – The Assassin and Mad Max: Fury Road
- 2016 – No Home Movie
- 2017 – Dunkirk
- 2018 – Roma
- 2019 – Pain and Glory
- 2020 – Martin Eden
- 2021 – Drive My Car
- 2022 – EO
- 2023 – Killers of the Flower Moon
- 2024 – All We Imagine as Light
- 2025 – Sinners

== Personal life and education ==
Dargis grew up in Manhattan's East Village, regularly attending St. Mark's Cinema and Theatre 80. She graduated from Hunter College High School and received her BA in literature from State University of New York at Purchase.

She received a Master of Arts in cinema studies from the New York University Graduate School of Arts and Science. In 2007 she returned to graduate school to obtain a Ph.D. in cinema studies.

Dargis married wine expert Lou Amdur in 1994. They live in Los Angeles.

== See also ==
- New Yorkers in journalism

Media offices
| Preceded by Janet Maslin | Chief film critic of The New York Times (with A. O. Scott until 2023); 2000–present | Succeeded by Incumbent |
