= José Rodríguez-Soltero =

Experimental filmmaker

José Rodríguez Soltero
- Born: 1943; Santurce, Puerto Rico
- Died: May 22, 2009 (aged 65–66); New York City, New York
- Education: University of Puerto Rico, San Francisco State University, University of Paris
- Occupations: Filmmaker, Performance Artist
- Notable work: Jerovi (1965), Life, Death and Assumption of Lupe Vélez (1966), Diálogo con el Che (1968)

José Rodríguez Soltero (1943-2009) was an experimental Puerto Rican filmmaker and performance artist whose work was mostly based around the 1960s queer art scene of New York City and the underground film community. Only three of his films from this period have survived: Jerovi (1965), Life, Death and Assumption of Lupe Vélez (1966) and Diálogo con el Che (1968). He also worked on political newsreels with the Young Lords and made a video about Puerto Rico for the United Nations Committee on Decolonization.

== Early life ==
José Rodríguez Soltero was born in 1943 in Santurce, Puerto Rico. He studied at the University of Puerto Rico, where he directed his first film El pecado original (1964).

== Artistic Career in the U.S. ==
In the mid-1960s Rodríguez Soltero moved to the United States, first to San Francisco and later settling in New York City where he worked as editor-in-chief for a short lived quarterly journal titled MEDIUM and imparted courses on film and video at Cooper Union and the Sterling-Manhattan's Public Video Access Center. During this time, Rodríguez Soltero also studied at San Francisco State University and the University of Paris. In 1966 he directed and performed in a theater piece titled LBJ, staged at the Bridge Theater on St. Marks Place, where Rodríguez Soltero burned an American flag while the then hit song “The Ballad of the Green Berets” played in the background, this happening was reviewed by the Village Voice and Life Magazine.

He directed three films while living in the United States: Jerovi (1965), Life, Death and Assumption of Lupe Vélez (1966) and Diálogo con el Che (1968) and was part of the queer underground art and film scene of New York City during the 1960s, where he collaborated with Puerto Rican Warhol superstar Mario Montez, playwright and theater director Charles Ludlam, underground cinema pioneer Jack Smith and Venezuelan performance artist and actor Rolando Peña.

At the turn of the 1960s and up to the mid-1970s Rodríguez Soltero turned to more political projects and collaborated with the Young Lords by producing newsreels known as the Young Lord Bulletins. Also, he made a video about Puerto Rico titled ¡Despierta Boricua! for the United Nations Committee on Decolonization.

In his later years, Rodríguez Soltero had retired from filmmaking and worked for the Department of Social Services in the New York City. He died in 2009.

== Filmography ==
=== El pecado original (1964) ===
Produced while he was a student at the University of Puerto Rico in 1964, El pecado original was a surrealist film made as an homage to Luis Buñuel. It was screened at the International Suncoast Film Festival in Florida in 1965, where it was awarded the Grand Prize. As of 2021, no copies have been found.

=== Jerovi (1965) ===
Commissioned by Jeroví Sansón Carrasco, who also plays the title character, Jerovi was filmed in 1965 in San Francisco. The short-film is a queer reimagining of the myth of Narcissus and was banned from the Ann Arbor Film Festival in 1965, because it was perceived then as pornographic for its depiction of male nudity.

=== Life, Death and Assumption of Lupe Vélez (1966) ===
Produced as a response to Kenneth Anger's description of Mexican actress Lupe Vélez in the book Hollywood Babylon (1959), and its subsequent adaptation by Andy Warhol in his film Lupe (1966), Life, Death and Assumption of Lupe Vélez (1966) was written and directed by José Rodríguez Soltero, and stars Mario Montez as the title character.

=== Diálogo con el Che (1968) ===
Filmed shortly after Che Guevera's death in 1967, Diálogo con el Che stars Rolando Peña as the title character and also features Taylor Mead as a CIA agent. Andy Warhol collaborated with the production and the movie was screened at the Berlin Film Festival in 1969.

== Legacy ==
Shortly before his death in 2009, Rodríguez Soltero's films received an increased attention for his role in the development of the underground queer cinema of the 1960s and he gave consent to The Film-Makers' Cooperative to remaster his surviving works. Jerovi (1965), Life, Death and Assumption of Lupe Vélez (1966) and Diálogo con el Che (1968) are currently available for on demand streaming.
