= Star Spangled to Death =

- Directed by: Ken Jacobs
- Written by: Ken Jacobs
- Distributed by: The Film-Makers' Cooperative
- Release date: 2004
- Running time: 402 minutes
- Country: United States
- Language: English

Star Spangled to Death is a 2004 experimental film directed by Ken Jacobs, consisting almost entirely of archive footage, depicting Jacobs' view of the United States in film.

Jacobs began compiling material in the late 1950s, and premiered the film (almost seven hours in length) at the 2004 New York Film Festival.

It won the Douglas Edwards Experimental/Independent Film/Video Award at the Los Angeles Film Critics Association Awards 2004.

== See also ==
- List of longest films
- Jack Smith - American filmmaker, actor, and pioneer of underground cinema
