= David E. James =

British-American film scholar, filmmaker and poet

David E. James (born 1945) is a British-American film scholar and film maker. He is Emeritus Professor of Critical Studies in The University of Southern California School of Cinematic Arts. He has published books and articles on avant-garde cinema, international cinema, especially that of Korea and China, and countercultural and multicultural film, music and art in Los Angeles and Southern California. He is also a filmmaker and a published poet.

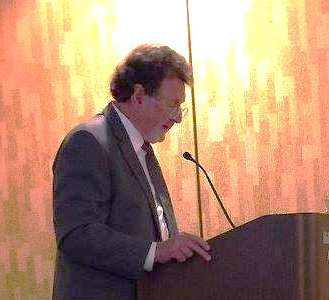
David E. James

== Career ==
James taught at USC from 1990 to 2023, and was Chair of the Division of Critical Studies, most recently in 2012–13. He was Professor of English at Occidental College from 1980–90, and Chair of the Department from 1986–1989. In 1979–80, he was Professor in the English Department at Korea University in Seoul. From 1971–79 he taught in the English Department at the University of California, Riverside. He has held visiting appointments at The University of Cambridge (2016) Nanyang Technological University, Singapore (2018), Viet Nam National University, Hanoi (2006 and 2011), Stockholm University, Sweden (2002), Korea National University of Arts, Seoul (1999), National Taiwan University (1994); Beijing Film Academy (1992), New York University (1989) and Shanghai University of Science and Technology (1988).

== Publications on film studies ==
David James’ most widely known book is Allegories of Cinema: American Film in the Sixties (Princeton, New Jersey: Princeton University Press, 1989.) The book studies what James calls “artisanal” cinema and its relation to the “industrial” cinema of Hollywood studios. He argues for a relationship between these seemingly opposed modes of production, suggesting that explicitly or unconsciously they were in dialogue with each other. For James, alternative cinema is not determined solely by formal and aesthetic choice, but is related to the oppositional, dissident and minority subcultures (Black liberation, Second Wave feminism, anti-Vietnam war activists) that made up their audience. James places such filmmakers as Stan Brakhage and Andy Warhol within this paradigm.

James has continued to work on the legacy of underground and experimental film, editing books on Ken Jacobs and Jonas Mekas and Stan Brakhage.

== Publications on popular culture and media ==
James’ essays and books argued for the significance of underappreciated music and art movements, as well as film, in Southern California, particularly those produced by minority subcultures. In City of Quartz, one of the most famous studies of Los Angeles, Mike Davis places David E. James within a long tradition of radical thinkers about Los Angeles. In the late 1980s, James was a regular reviewer for Artweek, covering shows and performances in Southern California.

In Rock ‘N’ Film: Cinema’s Dance with Popular Music (New York: Oxford University Press, 2016), James connects the two most dominant forms of American popular culture. According to James, Film reproduced the contradictions of popular music, utopian and transformative on the one hand, and subject to commodification and corporate exploitation on the other.

== Films ==
James' recent films, and associated articles, have centered on his ancestral village of Laxton, Nottinghamshire, one of the last remaining examples of open field system of agriculture in the UK.

James' films have been screened at numerous venues.

- My Weakness (16 mm, b/w, 8 mins.), shown at the Whitney Museum of American Art "Young American Filmmakers Program", 21–27 March 1974
- Let Mans Soule Be A Spheare (16 mm, b/w, 6 mins.), screened at the Los Angeles Film Forum, 25 November 1987
- Nine Scenes (1980, 16 mm, color, 20 mins.), shown at the Pasadena Film Forum, 7 December 1981 and the San Francisco Cinematheque, December 1981

== Poetry ==
James is the author of a number of chapbooks of poetry. His poems have been anthologized in several collections of Los Angeles poetry from the 1970s and 1980s, and his readings were recorded in two spoken word albums.

== Books ==
- Power Misses II: Cinema, Asian and Modern. London: John Libbey Publishing, and Bloomington: Indiana University Press, 2021. ISBN 9780861967476.
- Rock ‘N’ Film: Cinema’s Dance with Popular Music. New York: Oxford University Press, 2016. ISBN 9780199387595.
- The Most Typical Avant-Garde: History and Geography of Minor Cinemas in Los Angeles. Berkeley: University of California Press, 2005. ISBN 9780520242586.
- Power Misses: Essays Across (Un)Popular Culture. London: Verso Books, 1996. ISBN 9781859841013.
- Allegories of Cinema: American Film in the Sixties. Princeton, New Jersey: Princeton University Press, 1989. ISBN 978-0691006048.
- Written Within and Without: A Study of Blake's Milton. Frankfurt: Peter Lang, 1977. ISBN 9783261023612.

=== Books edited ===
- Alternative Projections: Experimental Film in Los Angeles, 1945-1980 (co-edited with Adam Hyman) London: John Libbey Publishing, and Bloomington: Indiana University Press, 2015. ISBN 978-0861967155.
- Optic Antics: The Cinema of Ken Jacobs (co-edited with Michele Pierson). New York and London: Oxford University Press, 2011. ISBN 978-0195384987.
- Stan Brakhage: Filmmaker. Philadelphia: Temple University Press, 2005. ISBN 978-1592132720.
- The Sons and Daughters of Los: Culture and Community in L.A. Philadelphia: Temple University Press, 2003. ISBN 978-1592130139.
- Im Kwon-Taek: The Making of a Korean National Cinema (co-edited with Kyung Hyun Kim). Detroit: Wayne State University Press, 2002. ISBN 978-0814328699. Korean translation, Hanul Books: Seoul, 2005; selected as "quality book" (usu doseo) by the Korean Ministry of Education, and a copy placed in every public library in Korea.
- The Hidden Foundation: Cinema and the Question of Class. Minnesota: University of Minnesota Press, 1996. ISBN 9780816627042.
- To Free the Cinema: Jonas Mekas and the New York Underground. Princeton, New Jersey: Princeton University Press, 1992. ISBN 9780691023458.
