= Lloyd Williams (filmmaker) =

American experimental filmmaker (born 1940)

Lloyd Michael Williams (born 1940) is an American experimental filmmaker. He was born in Brooklyn, NY and grew up on Long Island.

He was one of the co-founders of The Film-Makers' Cooperative along with Jonas Mekas. William's works Line of Apogee (1967), Rainbow's Children (1975), Wipes (1963), the Creation (1965) and Opus#5 (1961) were shown at the Museum of Modern Art. The sound tracks for Line of Apogee and Two Images for a Computer Piece were created by Vladimir Ussachevsky (the "father of electronic music") at the Columbia-Princeton Electronic Music Lab. Two Images was shown at the Whitney Museum of Arts as a part of the Composers Showcase. The electronic music was by Ussachevsky and the interlude was a live drum solo.
