= Edward Owens (filmmaker) =

African-American filmmaker and director

Edward Owens (1949–2010) was a queer African-American filmmaker, active within the New American Cinema of the 1960s. A native Chicagoan, he is best known for his experimental films Remembrance: A Portrait Study (1967) and Private Imaginings and Narrative Facts (1968–70).

== Personal life and influences ==
As a teenager, Owens, a resident of Chicago's South Side, spent his free time experimenting with 8mm film. He went on to study painting and sculpture at the School of the Art Institute of Chicago (SAIC). There he met the experimental filmmaker Gregory Markopoulos, who had founded the school's film program. Markopoulos was impressed with Owens' film work and urged him to move to New York City, which he did in 1966. In New York, Markpoulous became a mentor for Owens, introducing him to influential figures in filmmaking and art such as Andy Warhol, Gerard Malanga, Marie Menken, Gregory Battcock and Charles Boultenhouse.

In 1971, after making a few portrait style films in New York and successfully entering the film scene, Owens moved back to Chicago. He ended his film career at the young age of 20, when his self-proclaimed drug addiction and undiagnosed bipolar disorder began to take their toll. The films that now survive from Owen's body of work are three experimental films that he made as an 18-year-old entering New York's underground film community. A fourth surviving title, Autre Fois J'ai Aime Une Femme (1966), was preserved through state-of-the-art 5K digital transfer, facilitated by MM Serra of The Film-Makers' Cooperative along with Owens' three other films.

== Career ==
=== Style ===
Owens' films can characterized by their painterly approach and personal feel. His films from 1966 to 1970 displayed growth within mastering a form. Originally inspired by Markopoulous' own style, Owens was able to create something within his own right. Owens' film are recognizable for their dramatic lighting and the use of superimposition and layering of images. His featurette Tomorrow's Promise (1967) tells a story of emptiness. Created when Owens was only 18 years old, it references Markopoulos's Twice a Man (1963). Owens' approach to lighting and layered images, as well as changes in orientation and color, convey Owens' version of his personal life. Owens' film Remembrance: A Portrait Study (1967) is a portrait of Owens' mother Mildered, and her friends Irene Collins and Nettie Thomas. Within the film, each person is personified through song. "Running Wild" by Marilyn Monroe accompanies Nettie, while "All Cried Out" by Dusty Springfield accompanies Mildred. Private Imaginings and Narrative Facts (1968–70) focuses more directly on Owens' mother, layering her image with those from magazines and other pop cultural sources.

=== Filmography ===
- Autrefois J'ai aime une femme (1966)
- Tomorrow's Promise (1967)
- Remembrance: A Portrait Study (1967)
- Private Imaginings and Narrative Facts (1968–70)

== Death ==
In 1971, Owens left New York for personal reasons and returned to his home state of Illinois. He died, without completing another film, at the age of 60, in October 2010.

== Recognition ==
While Owens' film Remembrance: A Portrait Study graces Parker Tyler's list of the most significant avant-garde films of 1968 in his Underground Film: A Critical History (1969), his work was largely unknown to contemporary audiences until the 2000s, engaged through the Film-Makers Cooperative in New York City. In 2006, Ronald Gregg included Owens' films into a screening series at the University of Chicago titled "Beyond Warhol, Smith, and Anger: Recovering the Significance of Postwar Queer Underground Cinema, 1950-1968". In 2009, the film programmer Ed Halter began working to spark the public's recognition of Edward Owen's work by rediscovering and redistributing his work as well as conducting personal interviews with Owens to better understand his creative vision.

In June 2016, collaborating with IndieCollect, The Film-Makers' Cooperative Executive Director MM Serra arranged for the 5k digital transfer of all four Edwards Owens films within the NACG collection, under the supervision of their digital media specialist Sheldon Henderson. These digital transfers allowed for distribution and world-wide visibility of Owens' films through online Video on Demand programs.

In 2017, curators Mark Godfrey and Zoé Whitley included Owens' films in the exhibition Soul of a Nation: Art in the Age of Black Power, calling them "not only early examples of an experimental filmmaker turning to Black life for their subject, but an even rare case of a queer Black aesthetic on celluloid." Owens' films have also been screened at the Gene Siskel Film Center in Chicago (2018), the LA Film Forum (2019), the Museum of Modern Art in conjunction with The Film-Makers' Cooperative (2019), and the Maysles Documentary Center (2020).
