= Little Stabs at Happiness =

- Directed by: Ken Jacobs
- Starring: Jack Smith; Jerry Sims
- Narrated by: Ken Jacobs
- Distributed by: The Film-Makers' Cooperative
- Running time: 15 minutes
- Country: United States
- Language: English

Little Stabs at Happiness is an American experimental short film by Ken Jacobs.

== Synopsis ==
The film is divided into four chapters. In the first, Jack Smith and a woman sit in a bathtub, where they smoke and play with dolls. The second chapter shows two women sitting on a roof, as a voiceover by Jacobs discusses the film and looks back at his former relationships with the people appearing in it. The section ends with a rapid sequence of shots showing shadows on a wall and people playing on a roof.

In the third chapter, Jerry Sims and a woman sit outside as it rains. It closes with a rapid sequence of shots in which Jacobs and a group of children make chalk drawings on a sidewalk. The final chapter is set to Martha Tilton's "The Happy Bird" and features Smith dressed as a clown, relaxing on a roof and playing with balloons.

== Production ==
In 1956, Jacobs began shooting footage for Star Spangled to Death, a large project that remained unfinished until 2004. He created Little Stabs at Happiness as "a true breather" which gave him an opportunity to take a break from the large scale of Star Spangled to Death. Shooting took place in New York City from 1958 to 1959, on and around a West 75th Street apartment building where Jacobs worked. He added title cards to identify the film's four sections, but it was otherwise edited entirely in camera.

== Release and reception ==
Jacobs showed some of the footage from Little Stabs at Happiness with The Death of P'town in 1961, at the Sun Gallery in Provincetown, Massachusetts. The following year, he first showed an unfinished version of the film at the Charles Theater in New York, as part of a monthly open screening he organized. Since the film did not yet have a soundtrack, he played 78 rpm records to accompany it. The audience response was extremely divided. Jonas Mekas was in attendance, and he later secured funding from Jerome Hill so that the soundtrack could be completed and distribution prints could be made for the recently established Film-Makers' Cooperative. Sheldon Renan described the response as having been "greatly admired by film-makers, but not by audiences." The film is now part of Anthology Film Archives' Essential Cinema Repertory collection.

== Bibliography ==
- Brakhage, Stan (1989). Film at Wit's End. McPherson & Company. ISBN 978-0-914232-99-5.
- Hoberman, J. (2025). Everything Is Now: The 1960s New York Avant-Garde—Primal Happenings, Underground Movies, Radical Pop. Verso Books. ISBN 978-1-80429-086-6.
- Pierson, Michele; James, David E.; Arthur, Paul, eds. (2011). Optic Antics: The Cinema of Ken Jacobs. Oxford University Press. ISBN 978-0-19-538497-0.
- Renan, Sheldon (1967). An Introduction to the American Underground Film. E. P. Dutton & Co.
- Sitney, P. Adams (1979). Visionary Film: The American Avant-Garde, 1943–1978. Oxford University Press. ISBN 978-0-19-502486-9.
