= À tout prendre =

- Directed by: Claude Jutra
- Written by: Claude Jutra
- Produced by: Claude Jutra; Robert Hershorne
- Starring: Claude Jutra; Johanne Harrelle
- Cinematography: Michel Brault; Bernard Gosselin; Jean-Claude Labrecque
- Edited by: Claude Jutra
- Music by: Maurice Blackburn; Jean Cousineau; Serge Garant
- Production companies: Les Films Cassiopée; Orion Films
- Release date: August 10, 1963
- Running time: 99 minutes
- Country: Canada
- Language: French
- Budget: $60,000

À tout prendre (released as All Things Considered in English Canada and as Take It All in the United States) is a Canadian drama film, directed by Claude Jutra and released in 1963. The film stars Jutra and Johanne Harrelle. The film is widely recognized as one of the inaugural films of a new wave of Quebecois cinema for a secular and progressive independent nation.

The film was made with the intention to blend documentary aesthetics with a fictional narrative. Jutra described it as a "re-happening" of events from his life, made "in the manner of Rouch." The film depicted taboo subjects of adultery, interracial sexuality, abortion, and homosexuality. It was his first film made outside the National Film Board.

The film's ending, in which Jutra's character walks off a pier into a river and presumably drowns, eerily foreshadowed his own death in 1986.

== Synopsis ==
The film was a semi-autobiographical portrait of Jutra's own life, focusing on his romantic relationship with actress and model Johanne Harrelle, and his struggle to accept his own homosexuality.

Both Jutra and Harrelle played themselves in the film. Notably, the film version of Jutra commits suicide at the end of the film, drowning himself in the St. Lawrence River, in virtually the same manner which Jutra himself would eventually commit suicide in 1986 after being diagnosed with early-onset Alzheimer's. The film's cast also includes Victor Désy, Tania Fédor, Guy Hoffmann, Monique Joly, Monique Mercure, Patrick Straram and François Tassé, as well as brief cameo appearances by Anne Claire Poirier and François Truffaut.

The film ends with Jutra deliberately walking off the end of a dock into a river, and then his friends are searching everywhere, asking each other: Have you seen Claude?

== Cast ==
- Claude Jutra as Claude
- Johanne Harrelle as Johanne
- Monique Joly as Monique
- Monique Mercure as Barbara
- Victor Désy as Victor
- Tania Fédor as the mother
- Patrick Straram as Nicholas
- François Tassé as actor
- Guy Hoffmann as The priest
- Anne Claire Poirier as a woman with a surprise party

== Background and production ==
It was filmed on location in Montreal on 16mm film in 1963, and then enlarged to 35mm for theatrical release. The majority of the scenes were shot in multiple versions, which allowed Jutra to build a collection of images and sounds to create his film, "like a writer working with his own dictionary of words."

Johanne Harrelle recalls she first met Jutra in 1954, and "Jutra was her first love." She also remembers that when Jutra was preparing to make A tout prendre, he asked her to move in with him, but "the more I lived with him, the more I was thinking it was just because he needed me for his film; it is not my way to linger, so I left."

== Release ==
The film had its premiere at the Montreal International Film Festival in August 1963, and general release began in May 1964. It was released internationally by United Artists, and in Canada by Columbia Pictures. In 1965, an English version, partly sub-titled was released. After its initial release in the 1960s, it was largely unavailable for decades until Jutra's siblings signed over the rights to the Cinémathèque québécoise in 2005.

== Reception ==
Pierre Jutras from La Cinémathèque Québécoise stated "this independent production, amateur in the best sense of the term, relies on improvisation by the actors based on their own memories; the whimsical tone, where laughter and the pleasure of storytelling are essential, even in the most serious moments, gives this work a vitality that remains relevant today."

Colin Young wrote in Film Quarterly, "the film is extremely stylish, in the decorative sense; filled with directorial and editorial flourishes, and it is revolutionary in its structure and narrative form." Overall, he opined it "is a rich, suggestive, provocative work." Eva Voldřichová Beránková observed "it is a remarkable autofiction film in which Jutra responds to Proustian theories about the superiority of literature over cinema and other arts based on direct imitation of reality."

Canadian film critic Thomas Waugh said the film was a "experimental narrative that shows a privileged young filmmaker passionately involved with a black model, who suddenly guesses that he likes boys." Waugh further states the relationship between the two eventually "dissolves in narcissism, rejection and bitterness."

American film critic Bosley Crowther said "one had best be prepared for an uncommon and intensely personal look-in on a man's exposition of his psyche when one goes to see this film." He also opined that ""it is certainly not a picture for an average conventional taste; it is also as amoral as nature; but it is one the swingers and all the buffs will have to see it."

== Accolades ==
Considered a landmark film in the history of Quebec and Canadian cinema, the film won the Grand Prize at the Montreal International Film Festival in 1963, and won the Canadian Film Award for Best Feature Film at the 16th Canadian Film Awards. It also won two awards at the 2nd International Experimental Film Competition in Knokke-Heist.

== See also ==
- Cinema of Canada
- List of Canadian films
- List of LGBTQ-related films of 1963
