= Marja Samsom =

Dutch artist

Marja Samsom is an international conceptual performance artist. She was connected to the early conceptual art movement in Amsterdam and has been living and working in New York City since the 1980s. Samsom's work has been presented by De Appel, The Clocktower, Franklin Furnace, and Participant Inc, and featured in the New York Times and Vogue.

== Life and work ==
=== Amsterdam ===
Marja Samsom began making Super-8 movies in the early 1970s in Amsterdam, soon adding polaroids, printed stills, and live performances to her repertoire. In the late 1970s she performed at De Appel art centre in Amsterdam, Centraal Museum in Utrecht, the Franklin Furnace Archive in New York, and various galleries. Marja Samsom also worked closely with Gallery Swart.

In her work, Samsom often plays with multiple identities, including the housewife and the pin-up. Questioning the artistic identity is an important part of Samsom's work.

During her career, Samsom has taken on various parts. She is most known for Miss Kerr and Miss Behave (Also known as #Mbhave).

Samsom's work also includes themes that can be seen as feminist. For example, in her performance 'Sardine Strip' (performed in De Appel in 1976), Samsom, wrapped in tinfoil, slowly strips. These kind of performances are often received as sensual and feminist. Nevertheless, Samsom does not explicitly define herself as a feminist.

Samsom typically doesn't give an explanation with her work, rather invites the public interpret it in their own way.

=== New York ===
Marja Samsom moved to New York City in 1980, where she continued her underground artistic career, presenting work at various galleries, including Hal Bromm and Bertha Urdang. In 1985 she invented her salon in the East Village, starting as an underground venue that became established as The Kitchen Club. The Kitchen Club became a popular international hub among fellow artists and people in the cultural scene, with guests including Lou Reed, Laurie Anderson, Malcolm McLaren, Jonas Mekas, Catherine Deneuve, and Björk. After celebrating its 20th anniversary in 2010, Samsom closed the Kitchen Club and Chibi's Bar in order to focus entirely on her art practice. In 2011 Samsom was artist-in-residence at New York art institute The Clocktower, presenting her storytelling performance and installation Shrine and hosting the radio show ARTonAIR.

In 2015, Samsom published a copy of her cahier Diary of a Forgotten Actress 1972-79, curated by the photographer duo Inez and Vinoodh. The book contains photographs and images of work from the early years. In 2021 she presented the livestream performance Miss Taken Identities through Participant After Dark. The same year, Samsom published her second book, Miss Taken Identities, containing new photographs and poetry, early polaroids, and previously unseen correspondence between herself and fellow artists.

== Collections ==
Marja Samsom's work is part of various art collections, including:

- Dutch Cultural Heritage Agency: early objects and video works from the late 1970s
- LIMA Dutch media art platform: early performance documentation
- De Appel, Amsterdam: archival documents
- Stedelijk Museum Amsterdam, Amsterdam: archival materials
- The Film-Makers' Cooperative, New York: films
