= Simply Johanne =

2024 documentary film

- French: Johanne, tout simplement
- Directed by: Nadine Valcin
- Written by: Nadine Valcin
- Produced by: Josiane Blanc; Ania Jamila
- Cinematography: Philippe Lavalette
- Edited by: Katherine Asals
- Music by: Jacques Kuba Séguin
- Production company: Sahkosh Productions
- Distributed by: Les Films du 3 mars
- Release date: September 10, 2024 (FCVQ)
- Running time: 75 minutes
- Country: Canada
- Language: French

Simply Johanne (French: Johanne, tout simplement) is a Canadian documentary film, directed by Nadine Valcin and released in 2024. The film is a portrait of Johanne Harrelle, the actress and fashion model who became one of the first significant Black Canadian public figures.

The film premiered at the 2024 Quebec City Film Festival, and went into theatrical release in October 2024.

It was longlisted for the 2024 Jean-Marc Vallée DGC Discovery Award, and won the award for Outstanding Feature Film at the 2024 Reelworld Film Festival.
