= Orchard Street (film) =

1955 film by Ken Jacobs

- Directed by: Ken Jacobs
- Release date: 1955
- Running time: 12 minutes
- Country: United States
- Language: English

Orchard Street is a 1955 silent short film directed by Ken Jacobs. The film depicts everyday street life on Orchard Street in the Lower East Side of Manhattan during the mid-1950s.

== Plot ==
Filmed on location, Orchard Street presents a series of brief shots of pedestrians, children at play, street vendors, and storefronts, capturing the bustle of the neighborhood's open-air market and sidewalk commerce.

== Production ==
Initially intending to create a film about pigeons, Jacobs lacked the finances to travel around New York City to record the animals. In search of a single locale in which to film, and having recently moved to the Lower East Side, Jacobs initially selected Orchard Street to film given its proximity.

Jacobs had grown increasingly critical of capitalism during his two-year tour of duty in the U.S. Coast Guard and he was drawn to the particular form of commerce on Orchard Street. The film is also a reflection on the effect of cruelty. Jacobs' intention to capture the activities of residents in the neighborhood whose population had swelled in the wake of the Jewish in migration after the Holocaust. At the same time, Jacobs reported finding Orchard Street comforting, having grown up in the demographically similar predominately Jewish neighborhood of Williamsburg, Brooklyn.

Jacobs filmed Orchard Street with a Bell & Howell 16mm camera he purchased after returning to New York City after his tour of duty in the Coast Guard. During filming, Jacobs was accompanied by his friend Alan Becker who served as his assistant.

== Legacy ==
Orchard Street inspired the set design of the 2025 Academy Award-nominated film Marty Supreme. Director Josh Safdie was inspired by the film after having first seen Orchard Street during a screening at the Museum of Modern Art. According to production designer Jack Fisk, the film's crew studied Orchard Street in preparation for creating Marty Supreme's sets.

== Sources ==
- Pierson, Michele (2011). "Introduction: Ken Jacobs—A Half-Century of Cinema". In Pierson, Michele; James, David E.; Arthur, Paul (eds.). Optic Antics: The Cinema of Ken Jacobs. New York, NY: Oxford University Press. pp. 3–24. ISBN 0-19538-498-9.
