= Johanne Harrelle =

Canadian actress, model, and writer (1930–1994)

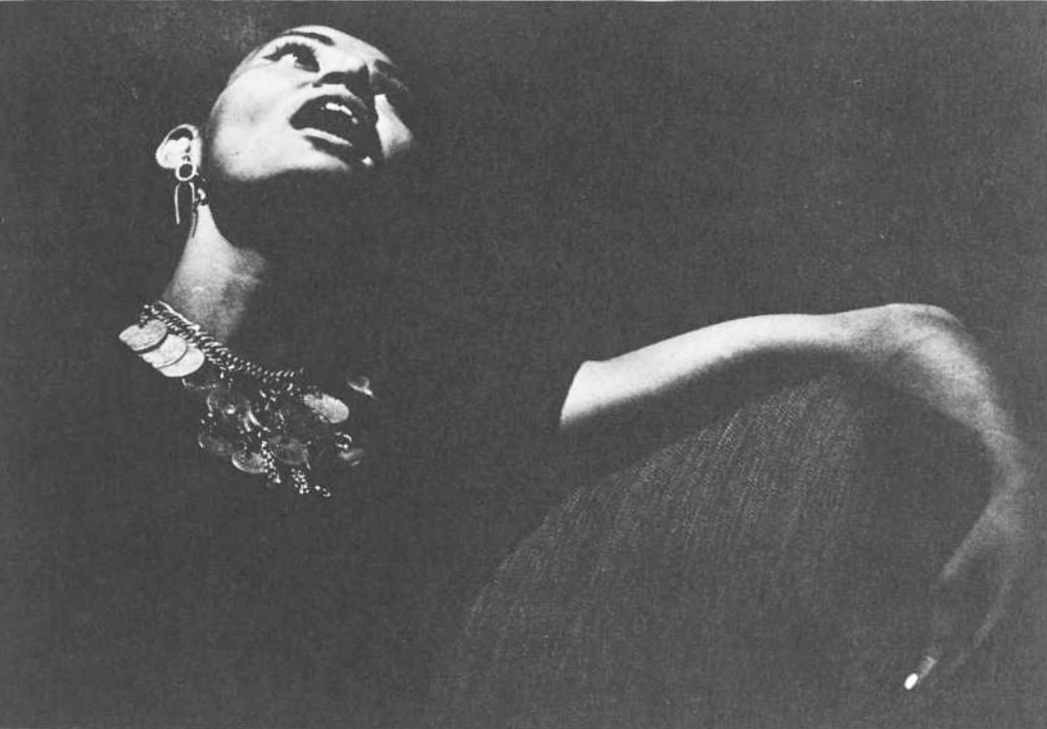
- Born: January 29, 1930; Montreal, Quebec, Canada
- Died: August 4, 1994 (aged 64); Nuns' Island, Quebec, Canada
- Occupations: Actress, model, writer
- Spouse: Edgar Morin (m. 1972; div. 1981)

Johanne Harrelle (January 29, 1930 – August 4, 1994) was a Canadian actress, model, and writer, and the first black woman to rise to prominence in Quebec and Canada's fashion world.

She played a fictionalized version of herself in Claude Jutra's first feature film, À tout prendre (1964). Harrelle, who was romantically involved with Jutra for a time, played the lover and companion to the film's other protagonist, Claude, played by Jutra himself. Her role in the film, as herself, describes the way in which she was perceived as an exotic outsider in French Canada, and people often assumed that she was Haitian, despite having been born in Montreal. These assumptions are played with in the film, as when she performs a song in patois, "Ti-zoizeau."

Johanne was baptized as Joan Harrell. She was raised with her two brothers in an orphanage after their African American father died, and French Canadian mother fell ill when she was only 3 years old. She later became known in the fashion world as Johanne Harrelle. Her first appearance on a fashion runway was at Montreal's upscale Ritz Carlton Hotel in the 1950s, when black models were unheard of, in Canada.

Harrelle, who was married twice, lived for 15 years with her second husband, the renowned Parisian sociologist Edgar Morin. She had two sons, Val Harrelle and Alain Cadieux. Late in life she returned to acting, with small supporting roles in the film The Kiss and the television series Marisol and Scoop.

She died from cancer on August 4, 1994.

In 2024, she was the subject of Nadine Valcin's documentary film Simply Johanne (Johanne, tout simplement).
