= The Film-Makers' Cooperative =

Filmmaker organization in New York, US

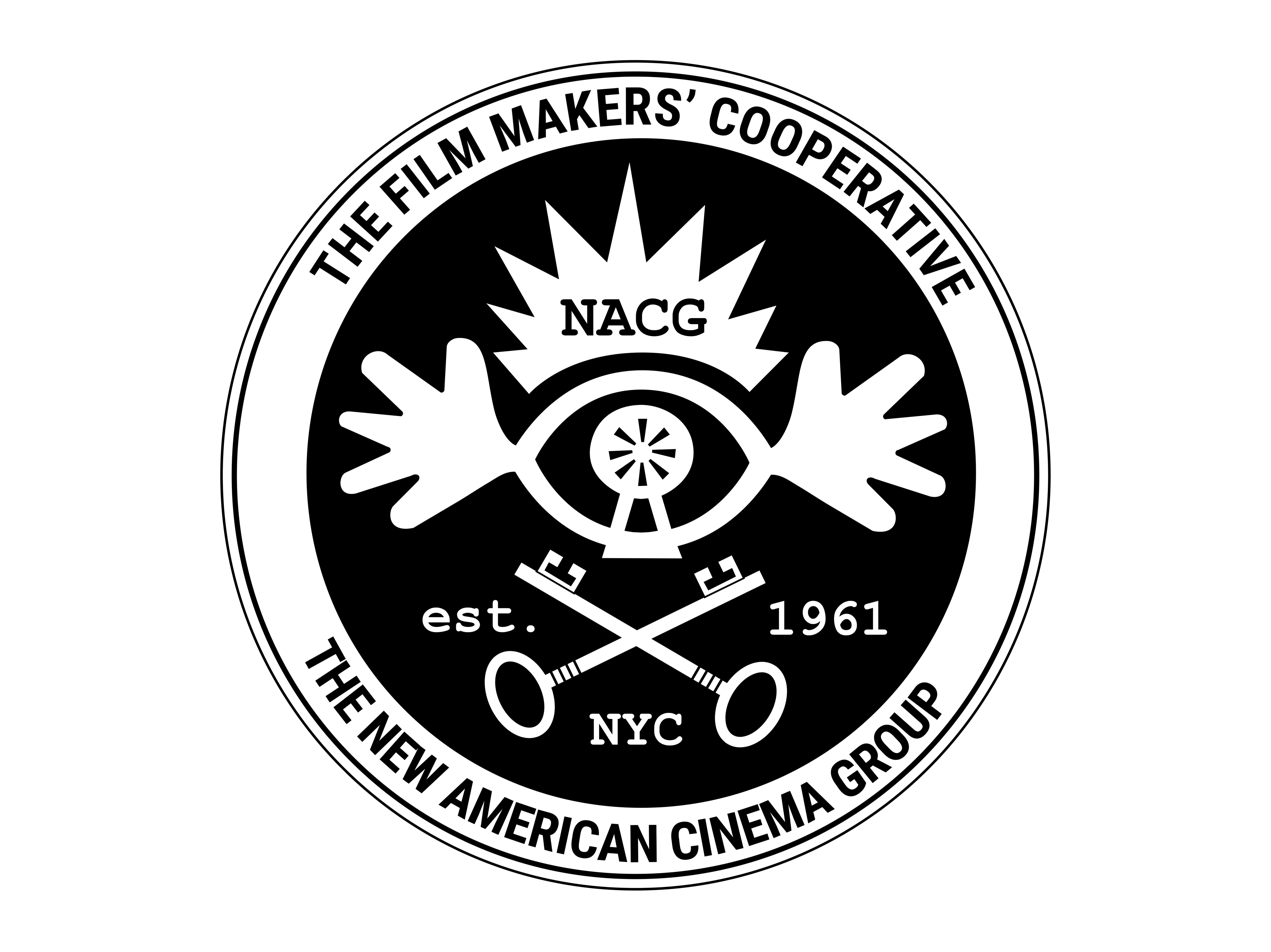
- Established: July 14, 1961; 65 years ago
- Headquarters: 475 Park Avenue South, 6th Floor
- Location: New York, NY, United States
- Key people: David Schwartz, Board President; Emily Singer, Board Vice President
- Website: film-makerscoop.com

The Film-Makers' Cooperative (a.k.a. The New American Cinema Group, Inc.) is an artist-run, non-profit organization founded in 1961 in New York City by Jonas Mekas, Andy Warhol, Shirley Clarke, Stan Brakhage, Jack Smith, Lionel Rogosin, Gregory Markopoulos, Lloyd Michael Williams, and other filmmakers, for the distribution, education, and exhibition of avant-garde films and alternative media.

== History ==
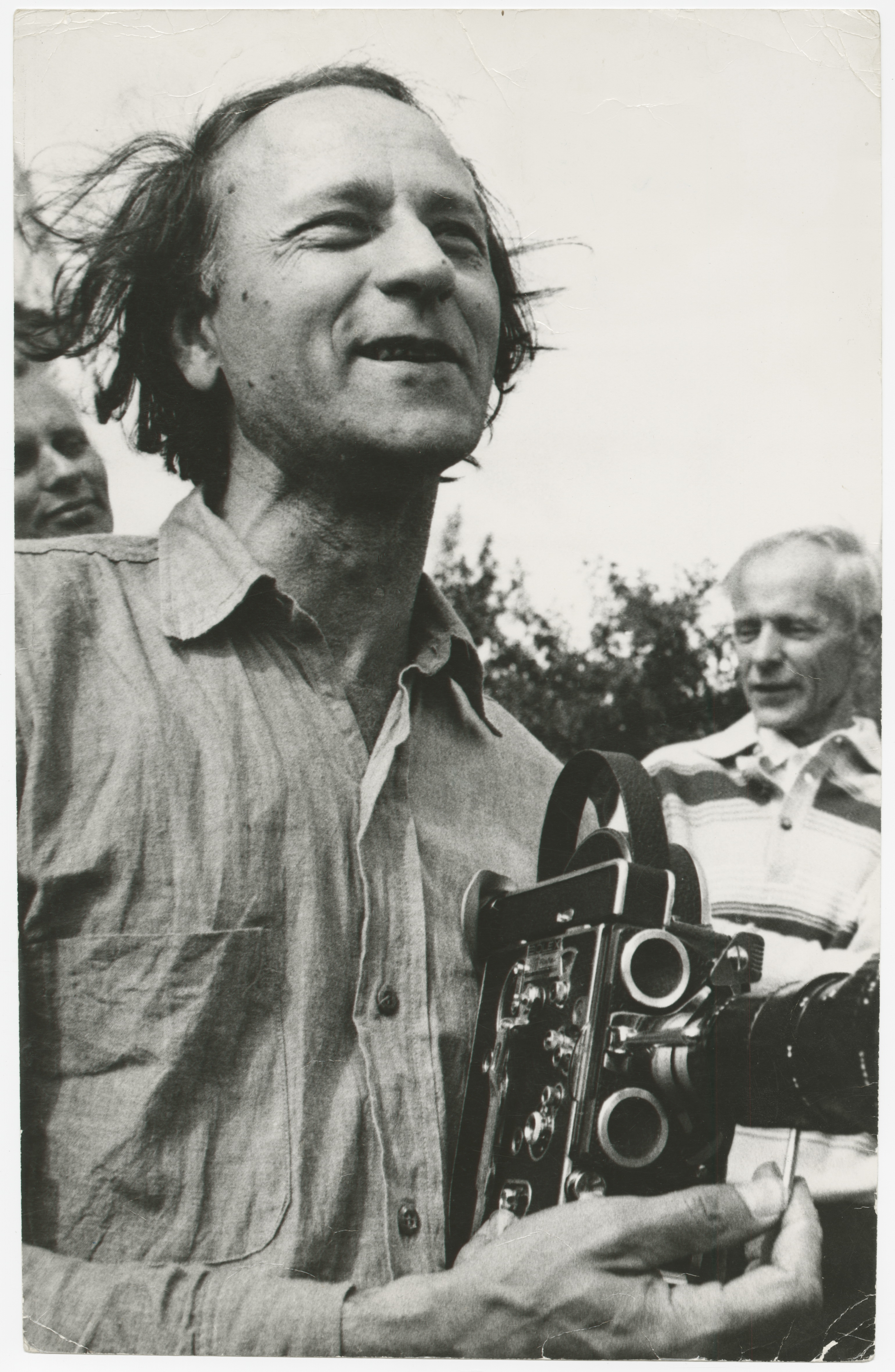
Jonas Mekas, one of the founders of The Film-Makers' Cooperative, pictured in 1971

In the fall of 1960, Jonas Mekas and Lewis Allen organized several meetings with independent filmmakers in New York City that culminated on September 28, 1960, with the group officially declaring themselves the "New American Cinema Group."

On January 7, 1961, at a contentious meeting of the Group, Amos Vogel attempted to stonewall the formation of the distribution center, claiming that his own Cinema 16 organization should be the only distributor of experimental films. However, Vogel was shouted down after it was pointed out that Cinema 16 refused to distribute Stan Brakhage's Anticipation of the Night (1958).

On September 30, 1962, Mekas presented the first draft of a manifesto for the New American Cinema Group, which included a call to form a cooperative distribution center. An excerpt from the manifesto reads:

In the course of the past three years we have been witnessing the spontaneous growth of a new generation of film makers — the Free Cinema in England, the Nouvelle Vague in France, the young movements in Poland, Italy, and Russia, and, in this country, the work of Lionel Rogosin, John Cassavetes, Alfred Leslie, Robert Frank, Edward Bland, Bert Stern, and the Sanders brothers. The official cinema all over the world is running out of breath. It is morally corrupt, esthetically obsolete, thematically superficial, temperamentally boring... As in the other arts in America today — painting, poetry, sculpture, theatre, where fresh winds have been blowing for the last few years — our rebellion against the old, official, corrupt and pretentious is primarily an ethical one. We are concerned with Man [sic]. We are concerned with what is happening to Man [sic]. We are not an esthetic school that constricts the filmmaker within a set of dead principles. We feel we cannot trust any classical principles either in art or life.

In 1966, coop founders started the Film-makers’ Distribution Center, a sister organization for theatrical release.

== About ==
The Film-Makers' Cooperative holds a large collection of avant-garde and experimental films, with over 6,000 titles by more than 2,500 filmmakers and media artists. The collection includes work created on 35mm, 16mm, Super 8mm, 8mm, video, and digital formats. The Cooperative rents out the films in its collection to cinématheques, film festivals, schools, universities, museums, and other art institutions in the United States and around the world.

Based upon a belief common to the founding members that the "official cinema is running out of breath" and has become "morally corrupt, aesthetically obsolete, thematically superficial, temperamentally boring" (as the original 1962 manifesto states), the Film-Makers' Cooperative was a key institution in the heyday of American experimental and underground film in the 1960s and 1970s, and has continued to operate on a non-exclusive basis to ensure the existence of an alternative, non-commercial film culture since then. As a result, the Cooperative is open to anyone who wishes to become a member.

The Film-Makers' Cooperative has inspired similar initiatives both within the United States (Canyon Cinema in San Francisco) and abroad (The London Film-Makers' Co-operative in England, ABCinema in Denmark, and elsewhere).

Besides distributing its members' films, the Film-Makers' Cooperative is continuously involved in film preservation and home media release projects, and in arranging screenings and events in and around New York City. In 2020, the Cooperative expanded its distribution to online video on demand programs, including panels with filmmakers and media artists.

== Directors and Board Members ==
Founding Director: Jonas Mekas
Executive Director: Tom Day
Members of the Board:

- David Schwartz, President
- Emily Singer, Vice President
- Gregg Biermann, Secretary
- Julia Curl
- Eduardo Darino
- Zacarías González
- David Schwartz
- Cody Simons
- Phillip Edward Spradley

Advisory Board:

- Kat Bauer
- cherry brice jr.
- Peter Cramer
- Jeffrey Deitch
- Bradley Eros
- Philip Glass
- Josh Guilford
- Ed Halter
- James Hansen
- Jim Hubbard
- Ken and Flo Jacobs
- Melissa Lyde
- Sebastian Mekas
- Bill Morrison
- Devon Narine-Singh
- Lynne Sachs
- Joel Schlemowitz
- Jack Waters
- Robert Withers

== Notable artists ==
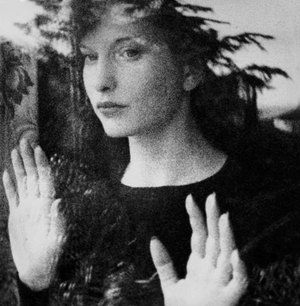
Maya Deren

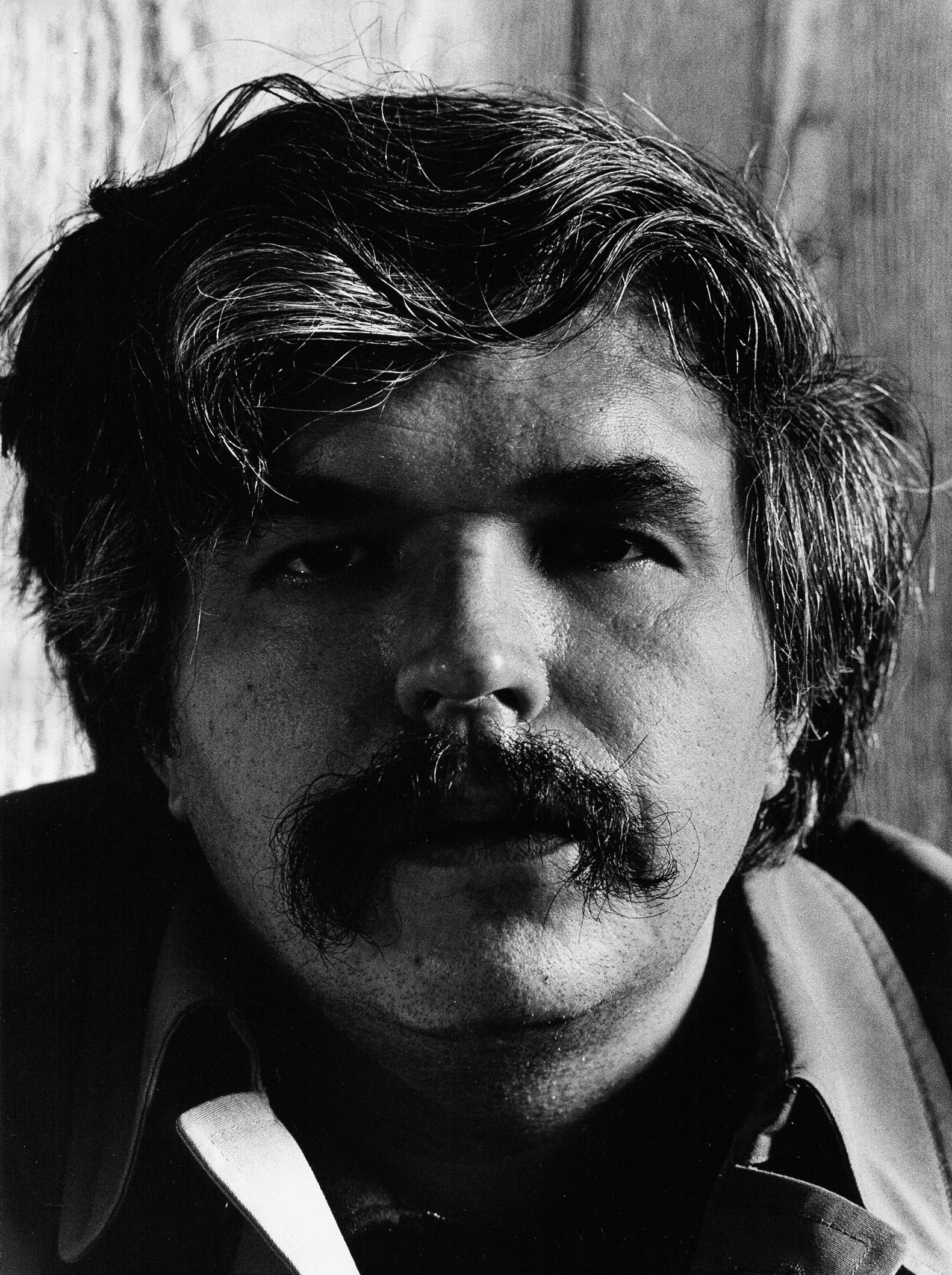
Stan Brakhage

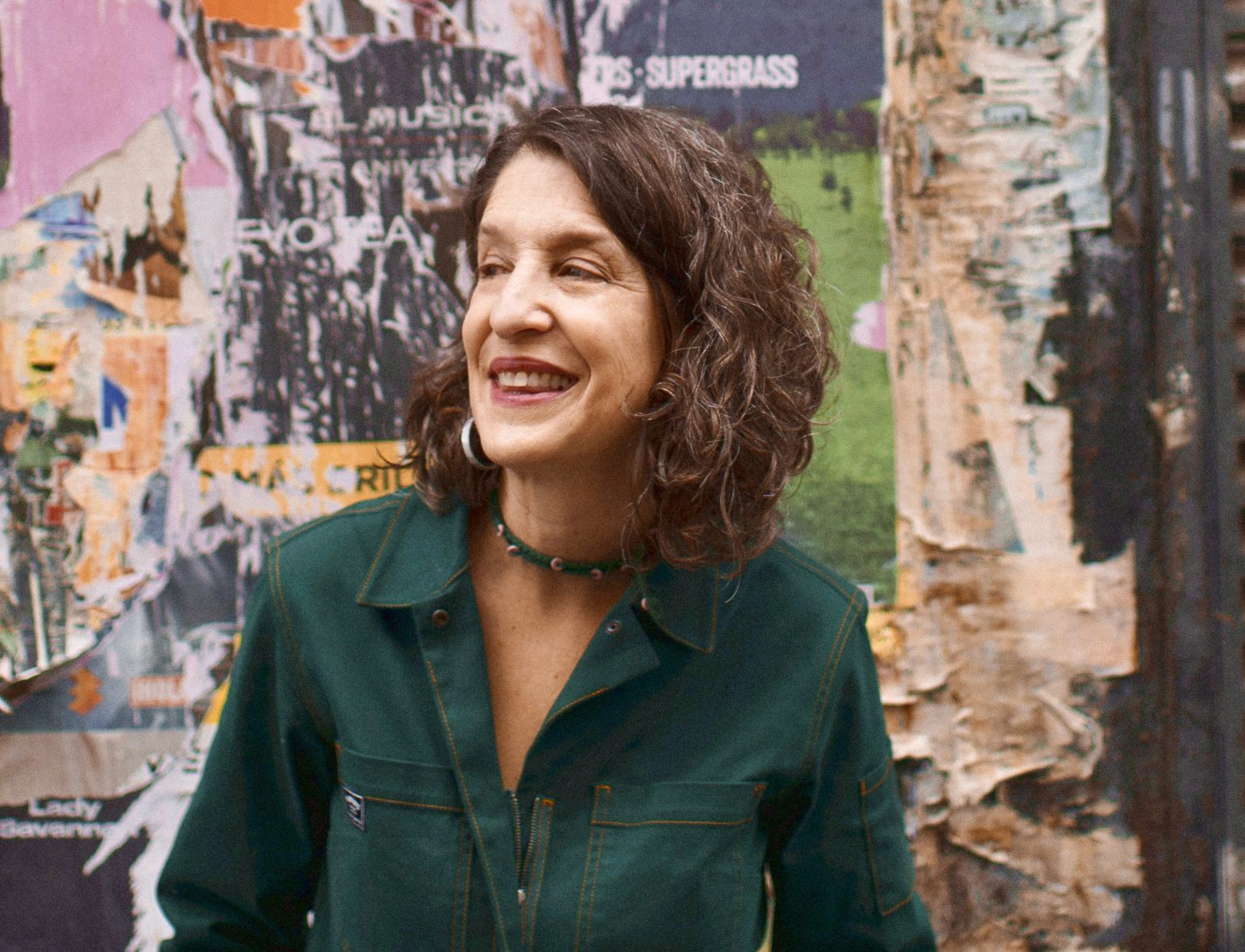
Lynne Sachs

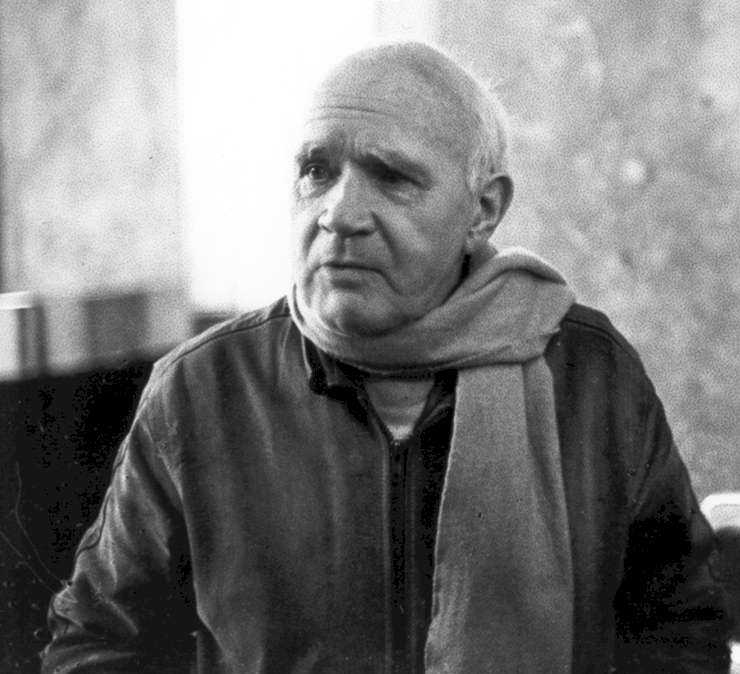
Jean Genet

Notable artists and filmmakers in the collection of the Film-Makers' Cooperative:

- Peggy Ahwesh
- Sara Kathryn Arledge
- Scott Bartlett
- Craig Baldwin
- Zoe Beloff
- Alan Berliner
- Les Blank
- Stan Brakhage
- Rudy Burckhardt
- Shirley Clarke
- Doris Totten Chase
- Abigail Child
- Joseph Cornell
- Eduardo Darino
- Storm De Hirsch
- Donna Deitch
- Maya Deren
- Ed Emshwiller
- Charles Henri Ford
- Hollis Frampton
- Su Friedrich
- Ernie Gehr
- Jean Genet
- Bette Gordon
- Larry Gottheim
- Curtis Harrington
- Emily Hubley
- Faith Hubley
- Takahiko Iimura
- Ken Jacobs
- Marjorie Keller
- Standish Lawder
- Lana Lin
- Willard Maas
- Babette Mangolte
- Taylor Mead
- Jonas Mekas
- Marie Menken
- Bill Morrison
- Edward Owens
- Suzan Pitt
- Jennifer Reeves
- Ron Rice
- José Rodríguez-Soltero
- Barbara Rosenthal
- Lynne Sachs
- Marja Samsom
- Carolee Schneemann
- Paul Sharits
- Harry Everett Smith
- Jack Smith
- Michael Snow
- Warren Sonbert
- Stan VanDerBeek
- Jud Yalkut
- Nick Zedd
