= Eduardo Darino =

American animator and film director

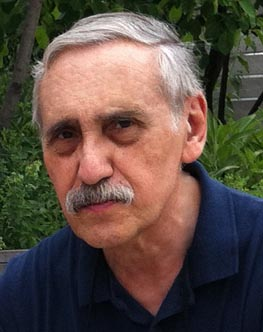
- Darino, at his studio
- Born: 6 February 1944 (age 82); Montevideo, Uruguay
- Other name: Ed
- Occupations: Animator; Narrator; Cartoonist; Film editor Film director
- Children: Lucia
- Website: sites.google.com/site/darinofilms/us-production

Eduardo Darino (born 6 February 1944) is a Uruguayan film producer, director, animator, and cartoonist.

Born in Montevideo, Uruguay, he studied law at the Universidad de la Republica and came to New York in 1973 where he still resides. During his career he has drawn multiple cartoon characters, produced several films, and made multiple television series and documentaries both in Uruguay and the United States.

== Films in Uruguay ==
In his early years, Darino had no access to a camera, so, inspired by Norman McLaren, his first experiments with animation included scratching and painting on the film stock itself.

=== Animation ===
He participated actively in the Cine Club del Uruguay and taught himself how to make films. His earliest work, Creacion (1963), is the first animation to be created over stock film and hand-painted in Uruguay. It was screened at the Annecy International Animated Film Festival in France, receiving a Certificate.

Darino's next films, El Idolo, Sombras sin Luces and Sombras y Luces (1965), are drawn on film stock, but include magnetic sound, like Cocktail de Rayas, which was re-created in digital form in 2011. This was followed by Correcaminos, aka Caminante, the first basic animation and computer art on the continent. It was cited by Clemente Padin as the "forerunner of Latin American code and web animation" in Ovum and other publications. During this time he illustrated book covers for Arca and designed cartoons for Diario Uruguay.

=== Fiction ===
Inspired by the acquisition of a Keystone 16mm camera, he shot El Suicida, a fifteen-minute film, with Felipe Lacroze; and Tan Solo Hombres, a thirty-minute film, with Mario Branda, assisted by Alberto Calvelo, with music by Pedro Zalkind, exploring creative editing to tell the story of a marginalized homeless person. Jose Carlos Alvarez praised this film in his review in La Mañana and it received an award at the Florence International Film Festival in 1976.

Through the years, Darino created animation and ID logos for the programs Telemundo and Telecataplúm. With the latter, he expanded his cartoon skills, drawing the show characters, and exploring cut-out techniques. He received an invitation to a film festival in Cordoba, Argentina, and, knowing that Jan Lenica would be the jury's president, he traveled to meet him. They discussed techniques that Darino later implemented in his own style in Carousel and Hello?

Norman McLaren wrote him an enthusiastic letter and left the door open for him to visit the National Film Board of Canada. When Darino was finally able to make the trip, McLaren was sick and semi-retired. He still has the letter's closing with McLaren's signature pinned up at his desk.

In February 1968 he filmed Apex, with Rodolfo Musitelli and actress Adriana Lagomarsino. This was the first short in CinemaScope done in Uruguay using posterization, years before its use by Andy Warhol in 1970.

Cine Club Fax invited him to develop the first full course in film-making. Darino wanted to work with an industry director and contacted Manuel Antin in Buenos Aires. He suggested Pablo Szir. Szir not only accepted, but brought Jorge Goldenberg, from the Escuela de Cine del Litoral in Santa Fe, along with him. As a final exercise the course produced Delito, focusing on social issues, with Mario Branda and Adela-Gleijer. This short received the Award Premio de la Asociación de Críticos Cinematográficos del Uruguay; Premio Festival de Cine Nacional,Cine Club Fax; and the Premio Nacional de Cinematografía Consejo Departamental de Montevideo, 1964.

Darino was to assist Pablo Szir with several of his films, designing titles or animation for El bombero esta triste y llora and Diario de campamento, and doing animation in Argentina and in Uruguay for Szir's Es un arbol y una nube and Una industria para el pueblo.

=== Documentaries ===
He filmed and directed the feature documentary Copihues Rojos for the Consejo Nacional de Ensenanza Primaria (Uruguay), a co-production with Chile about teachers' exchange between the two countries, and social issues, and Orate Frates about the miraculous San Cono festivities in Florida, assisted by Eduardo Terra.

Horacio Schek from Teledoce asked him to make a pilot for the travel series Pasaporte. Turismo asked for El Lapiz Magico, and Daniel Scheck, from El Pais, had him make Campeon de Campeones about the Uruguayan world soccer championships which closed out Darino's work in the 1980s. He made the animated film El Gallito Luis, combining cartooning with live actors, "way before Roger Rabbit", as Peter Cowie says in the International Film Guide.

At the ICUR, the only department of the university making films at the time, Darino filmed multiple science shorts: "Ancistrus", "Termites", "Spiders", and "Hoplias Malabaricus", continued doing cartoons and worked with Walter Dassory and Roberto Gardiol. Dr. Rodolfo Talice, ICUR's Director, entrusted him with Pontoporia – El delfin del Plata, a film about the language of dolphins, filmed in Punta del Diablo, Rocha, Uruguay. This was made with the participation of Japanese scientists and René Guy Busnel, a partner of Jacques Cousteau, who later published Psycho-acoustic Studies of Dolphins, and many other studies.

== Films in the United States ==
=== Animation ===
As a Fulbright fellow, studying at New York University's (NYU) Tisch School of the Arts, Darino was shocked to learn that the Oxberry animation stand, mentioned in the course catalog, was Francis Lee's and that the school would use it only a few hours a semester. He ended up assisting Lee, to get access to the stand, and animated Carioca for him for TV Globo. He was required to get a basic stand for his NYU thesis, Homomania, sound by Miguel Castro, which he started at ICUR, Uruguay. Eli Hamerow, his editing teacher, introduced the class to the Optical House, where he met Richard "Dick" Rauh.

At this time, Harry Marks was working for ABC and conceived of the idea of the moving logo. Eduardo hung around the 45th Street studios, trying to get a first look at the new technology, and was captivated by the possibilities of motion graphics, a subject he still teaches at Pratt Institute.

Dick Rauh invited him to join ASIFA EAST, where he met John Gatti and Tissa David. Both needed help, but he did not mesh with Gattis' stop-motion style using huge models. He tried key frame animation for Raggedy Ann & Andy, but also quit this because it was not his style. Tissa recommended him for a Charlie Brown special, where he had fun drawing Snoopy.

Although he loved to draw, he could not sit around all day, and he took assignments from two former classmates, Skip Winitsky at Urban Academy and Paul Kimball at ISO. Laurie Anderson asked him to shoot her early animations, and through Bernhard he edited a television spot with the voice of Orson Welles, who called him "a surrealist".

He needed more space, and to lend him money to buy a loft the banks were asking for proof he had "a real job". He was hired as creative director at World Publishing Co., then by Idea Publishing Co. to run their multimedia department. Working long hours, he illustrated many of their publications with his cartoons, signing them "Sylsu", a compound from the name of his wife Sylvia Susana. Once the required six months had passed, he left the publishing industry, setting up his own studio, Darino Films, on Park Avenue South.

After he graduated, NYU asked him to teach some animation workshops. His child Lucia was born, and Darino concentrated on animation for children, with The Bird, The Fox and the Full Moon (Texture Films) and many others. He was encouraged to produce material by his distributor Bernice Coe, since HBO and BRAVO were buying shorts as there were no commercials at that point. Bill Sloan screened his films at Donnell Film Library, and Homomania was shown at MOMA as part of an NYU selection of work by award-winning alumni.

DC Comics sponsored an American Lung Association PR campaign with a "Superman kit", and Darino was chosen to design and animate the cartoon superhero. This exposure landed him assignments to animate "Rainbow Unicorn" for Scott Co, followed by "Sketches of Agemo" and "Baron Sunday". The producers wanted the animation done in Asia, but Darino insisted it could be done in New York, implementing sensible budget-cutting ideas. When the ink and paint jobs were sent overseas he quit.

During a slow time in the industry, he got a one-project art director's job at Roger Wade Productions, where Jim Logan had produced animation. The studio had changed and was not using the Oxberry stand which was collecting dust. Darino made an offer, bought the Master Series animation stand, and ordered the first Cameraman computer system from Bill Ferster. But the gears did not register multiple passes properly, so he sold it.

Darino began to experiment with office duplicators and made Hello? for AT&T for the centennial anniversary of the first telephone conversation. He also produced Carousel, Tango and Kaleidoscope, the first animations using copiers with the CopyMotion system, developed by Darino, which he registered in August 1997. He produced other animated films: Doble o Nada, Setenta veces siete, La Carreta, Gaucho al galope, Rafa-Javi, and Gaviotas-Seagulls based on drawings by his grandsons Rafel and Javier in Punta del Este.

The CopyMotion process had an experimental, abstract flavor. Feeling he needed a realistic look, and in order to control the Oxberry precisely, he bought a Cinetron computer, the top-of-the-line in the industry but also very, very expensive. There were no tutorials then; learning was all by trial and error. Learning the software and generating camera effects, he created a few re-usable backgrounds, and offered camera service.

Sal Mallimo, from Mimondo Productions, used the service sporadically for his Saturday Night Live, The Venture Bros titles, and trailers. One day Mallimo had a cold and sent his art director, who learned about Darino's expertise, liked his work, and asked him to create a star field for a teaser of Star Trek. Barry Rappaport, interviewed by ADA, remembers: "Ed was doing the star fields for our teaser, and he came up with a trick by sandwiching the high-contrast kodaliths on an opal glass under the camera, and …a "glow" came out!!" Today the glow is part of film grammar and special effects tools.

Using the Cinetron, he started "painting with light", creating a name for the studio by his impressive streaks and slit scans. This was not yet computer graphics, but a photographic effect where the camera tracked while moving toward or away from a slit, behind which a back-lit artwork passed, exposing one frame at a time. Autodesk software evolved into the 3D world, and Mark Gerhard, in Petaluma, and Brent Blacken, in San Francisco, showed him the ropes on Animator and 3d max.

Doing interviews for SCIENCE 2000, he was suggested as a reviewer for Typestry. During lunch, they learned about Ed's drawing work and invited him to join a fledgling Pixar studio that had released Luxo Jr and was planning its first feature, Toy Story, in 1995. Darino declined Pixar's offer, preferring to stay in New York.

He signed two series for children, Man the Maker, about inventions, and Forgotten Legends. He tried producing storyboards and pre-production in Uruguay. In the 1980s he attempted to produce animation and films for export from Uruguay, but the political situation made him change his plans. Thirty years later, when he met Nicolás Peña from MoPix and Juan Jose Lopez from Aparato TV they had turned that dream into a reality. Darino Films also animated for The Legend of the Amazon River, narrated by Eli Wallach, The Great Cover Up from Texture Films, Ugly Duckling and Beauty and the Beast with Fred Ladd, and opening animation for Calliope for USA Networks. Maureen Gaffney from the Media Center for Children enthusiastically proposed to include his work in their series. "Your work is wonderful, children like it, and I think our new series would ensure it a place in the brave new world of home video".

Darino designed and animated over 300 ID logos for corporations and networks, including: IBM, Con Edison, New York Public Library, Phillip Morris, Daily News, Manhattan Cable, and AT&T, as well as television stations and international networks. The studio became well known abroad. Notre Monde in Paris had it produce the introduction to the series L'envie de savoir et de comprendre, and its client list expanded with Kalender, GuestMusic and SAV from Spain, Avo films and RAI from Italy, Turkish TRT, and China Public TV. Kailash Studios from Bombay, India landed in New York, and Darino animated a Hindu version of the Little King, Nirma and Vimal. Maazda had a presence in New York and requested cartoons for Rasna, and Mega Pictures commissioned tests for Raju and Chacha, although these plans fell through due to legislation in India protecting local production. At that time Darino was combining the pencil with the digital tablet.

Jeff Schillen from DEC Diamond Entertainment published in video the complete Space Exploration.

=== Documentaries ===
With Marketa Kimbrell's New York Street Theater Caravan, Darino improvised Process over a poem by Pablo Neruda about the Latin American struggle, which was well received at Festival dei Poppoli, in Florence, as well as in Houston and Chicago. He directed The Strangers for the US Bicentennial, Poison on the Walls for the NY City Health Department, and Antonio Frasconi: Against the Grain, which won an award at the Santa Barbara Film Festival, and Los Desaparecidos, which included woodcuts by Antonio Frasconi. During Paez Vilaro's period in New York, Darino did Candombe, with Vilaro's paintings and drawings, and text by Jorge Luis Borges. Humberto Goyen, General Consul from Uruguay, gathered artists in New York at the time. Alfredo Zitarrosa, Serebrier, Julio Alpui, Julian Murguia, and Darino, discussed a return to democracy in Uruguay and proposed action to show active support for Dr. Julio María Sanguinetti. Goyen interested Robert Allen, who backed a package of three titles suggested by Coe Films for HBO, and Darino prepared the docudrama Guri, the Young Gaucho, starring Eli Wallach from a story by Serafin J. Garcia. In order to use Wallach's services, Darino joined the SAG (Screen Actors Guild), and since then he has read many of the Spanish versions of his documentaries. Guri was shot in Uruguay. When Darino arrived on location, the expected return to democracy was delayed. He canceled the other two titles, and abandoned his plans to produce in his homeland.

=== Television specials ===
From then on Darino turned to producing science and nature-ecology series for television. He rejected proposals to create conventional shows, wishing to remain independent and, with his limited crew and budget, produced Save the Earth – Salvar la Tierra (the first time ozone was mentioned as a possible problem), World Disasters, Femmes Fatales, The Best of Slapstick, The World of 3D Studio, and Save Our Planet. He was the editor of over 300 episodes and French versions for the weekly show Hollywood Stars. Also for producer Sam Simerman he did special effects and animation for Biography with Denzel Washington, Tom Hanks, and Hollywood: The Magic Night, about the Oscar Awards.

As editor for SCTV-Entertainment News he did over 150 TV episodes of Hollywood Talks, combining interviews and motion picture EPK footage (material provided for the press reviews).

Madeleine Lopez Silvero asked him to do a fashion show for Galavision, and he accepted as long as he could include his effects. Darino combined graphics, split the screen, and included negative-positive footage. Executive producer Rogelio Sandoval said: [Darino] renovates the "runway" into a broadcasting top show, changing the way we see fashion with La Moda al Dia/Fashion Next, hosted by Janene Sumampow. Pushing the envelope at all times, and looking for original interviews and exclusive images, in Paris Darino met Michele Lagarde, press attaché for Mondial Coiffure and Mondial Beaute, who allowed him to use multiple cameras and unlimited interactive lights, and, in another first, integrating multiple projections, for several high end specials.

Thomas J. Ashley from Millennium Productions signed him for animation and editing on his popular minute series, This Day in Hollywood, This Day in New York and This Day in History.

=== Television series ===
The years for Satcom Digital Libraries show Darino working as producer-director, and in many episodes also editor-animator, of multiple television series and documentaries (serving as On camera host – SAG category – for several educational versions):

- Nature in Danger – nature
- Save The Earth – ecology/nature
- Science 2000 – science-technology
- English for Business & English for Executives
- Our Body Our Health
- Mysteries beyond Our Galaxy – space
- Secrets of Our Planets – space
- Discovering Our Universe – space
- Secrets from Our Galaxy – space
- Miracles of Science and Technology – science-technology
- Next-tech – science-technology
- The World of 3 – computer graphics
- Byte The Pixel – internet
- Cyberworld – web-internet
- Surfing the Web – internet
- Mastering the Internet – internet
- Discover Secrets of Science for Sandra Carter – Disney's Discover

=== Library of Special Visual Effects ===
Using advertisements in Millimeter and Variety magazines, Darino reached out to foreign producers arrived in New York looking for something new. Responding to the needs of these clients, he created a small archive of ready-made scenes, such as a star field, the earth spinning, or an explosion, which he later expanded into "The Library of Special Visual Effects", a collection of eleven hours of ready-to-use animation, openings and bumpers, licensed in more than 68 countries.

=== Experimental, contemporary digital animation ===
Camba Cate writes on Proyecto Cruz del Sur that Darino is one of the few artists who keeps up-to-date with technological changes on a daily basis, mastering film, then video and now computers. Cate cites Javier Kostura's interview on Midem News when Darino forecast: "the VHS is dead, it's the end of tape and DVD may not have a long life. In future years we will see a television station on each Mac and PC." He keeps exploring options: the tapeless camera, streaming video, and new ways of doing animation first with Time Arts' Lumena buffers, then with Adobe LiveMotion (precursor of Flash), and recently with particles.

He specialized in digital compositing in the series Make Believe and motion graphics in the series Is it Type or Image? and "electronic type crumbs", which he still teaches at Digital Arts, Pratt Institute. He experimented with interactive presentations, the most original being the series Irreverent Realities, and with intrusive flashes in public spaces, such as Times Square, Union Square Park, Washington Square, celebrating the anniversaries of artists' deaths, including Pedro Figari, Alfredo Zitarrosa, Juan Carlos Onetti and others.

"Digital imagine consists of 0 and 1, ON and OFF", Darino explains, "so why not animate at the pixel level?", sort of splitting the atom of CGI, which he does. Since rendering particles is a slow process, he joined forces with programmers to develop a system of real time particles, creating multiple shorts combined by subject: Digital Brush-Pincel Digital, Punta del Este (2010–2013). Darino has completed several interactive installations as "Self Scan" about his cancer, helping other patients to learn and consider options, and the series "Irreverent Realities" including animations for the anniversary of Onetti, Figari, Frasconi, Zitarrosa, Paez Vilaro and recently "New York Virtual Tour", exhibited in "It's Liquid", Venice, 2014 and January 2015, "Apex", world premiere, Cinematheque, San Francisco, "Seagulls, Gaviotas" Uruguay, New York, 2018–2019 animation dedicated to Norman McLaren, "Screening Cocktail de Rayas at Red Cat Disney, Ismo Ismo Ismo and Museo Reina Sofia, Madrid.

== Lifetime achievements ==
He contributed multiple achievements to the art of animation: the CopyMotion – Xerox animation process, the cell buffer animation with Lumena, the Library of Special Visual Effects, the tapeless camera, animation at pixel level and real time particles, and so the ADA (Association of Digital Artists) presented him with the decade's Award.

== Awards and honors ==
Film festivals: Annecy, São Paulo, Athens, Bilbao, Lisbon, Nyon, Florence, Cracow, Kenyon, Tenn., Montevideo, Edinburgh, Hiroshima, Washington, Teheran, Helsinki, Bucharest, Rio de Janeiro, and others.

He is (or has been) a member of the following associations:

- AIVF – Association of Independent Film and Video
- ASIFA – Association Internationale du Film d’Animation
- NATPE – National Association of Television Program Executives
- SALALM – The Seminar on the Acquisition of Latin American Library Materials
- SAG – Screen Actors Guild
- NABET – National Association of Broadcast Employees and Technicians
- ACM SGFFRAPH
