= Ken Jacobs =

American filmmaker (1933–2025)

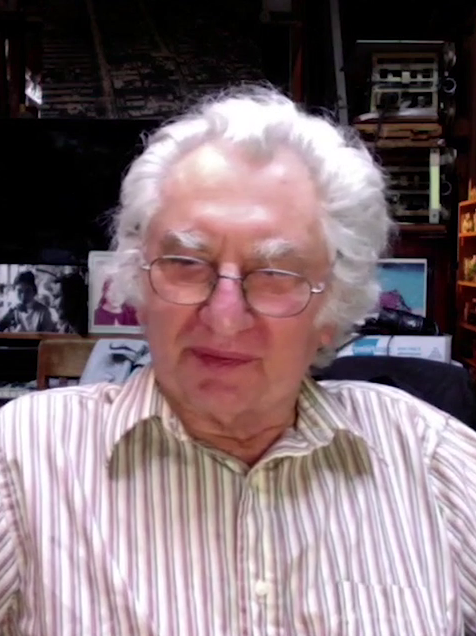
- Jacobs in 2021
- Born: Kenneth Martin Jacobs; May 25, 1933; New York City, U.S.
- Died: October 5, 2025 (aged 92); New York City, U.S.
- Occupation: Filmmaker
- Notable work: Tom, Tom, the Piper's Son
- Spouse: Florence Karpf (died 2025)
- Children: 2, including Azazel Jacobs

Kenneth Martin Jacobs (May 25, 1933 – October 5, 2025) was an American experimental filmmaker. His style often involved the use of found footage which he edited and manipulated. He also directed films using his own footage.

== Early life ==
Ken Jacobs was born in Brooklyn on May 25, 1933. His parents were divorced before he was born. His mother died when he was seven, after which he lived with his father until moving in with his grandmother when he was a teenager. Jacobs grew up in Williamsburg and became interested in cinema and abstract painting from visiting the Museum of Modern Art as a teenager. He attended the Eastern District High School before switching to the School of Industrial Art, where he learned sculpture.

After graduating high school, Jacobs was conscripted into the Coast Guard during the Korean War. Upon returning to New York, he audited a film class at City College taught by Dada artist Hans Richter, where he met filmmaker Jack Smith. Jacobs also studied painting under Hans Hofmann at the Hans Hofmann School of Fine Arts. Hofmann's "push and pull" spatial theories became a major influence on Jacobs's approach to cinema.

== Career ==
Jacobs made his first film, Orchard Street, in 1955, a portrait of the Lower East Side thoroughfare and its inhabitants inspired by the 1948 documentary In the Street. Jacobs directed Blonde Cobra in 1963. This short film stars Smith who directed his own Flaming Creatures the same year. In 1969 he directed Tom, Tom, the Piper's Son (1969, USA), in which he took the original 1905 short film and manipulated the footage to recontextualize it. This is considered an important first example of deconstruction in film. The film was admitted to the National Film Registry in 2007. His Star Spangled to Death (2004, USA) is a nearly seven-hour film consisting largely of found footage. Jacobs began compiling the archival footage in 1957 and the film took 47 years to complete.

Jacobs taught briefly at St. John's University from 1968 to 1969. He taught at the Cinema Department at Harpur College at Binghamton University from 1969 to 2002. He helped with the formation of the Collective for Living Cinema there in 1973, for which he served as an advisor.

In the 1990s, Jacobs began working with John Zorn and experimented with a stroboscopic effect, digital video, and 3D effects. Jacobs died from kidney failure in Manhattan, New York, on October 5, 2025, at the age of 92.

== Personal life ==
Jacobs met Florence "Flo" Karpf in Provincetown, Massachusetts. The couple married, and Flo was a frequent collaborator throughout Ken's film career. They had two children: artist Nisi Ariana and director Azazel Jacobs. Nisi assisted with the production of Ken's digital work during the 2000s. Ken and Flo appear in Azazel's 2008 film Momma's Man, which was shot in his parents' loft. Flo Jacobs died on June 4, 2025, four months before Ken.

== Selected filmography ==
- Orchard Street (1955)
- Little Stabs at Happiness (1960), 14:57 min, color, sound, 16 mm film on video.
- Blonde Cobra (1963), 33 min, color and b&w, sound, 16 mm film on video.
- Window (1964)
- Lisa and Joey in Connecticut (1965), 21:59 min, color, silent, Super 8mm film on video.
- Tom, Tom, The Piper's Son (1969), 133 min, color and b&w.
- Perfect Film (1986)
- Opening the Nineteenth Century: 1896 (1991)
- The Georgetown Loop (1996), 11 min, b&w, silent.
- Circling Zero: We See Absence (2002), 114:38 min, color, sound.
- Star Spangled to Death (2004), 440 min, b&w and color, sound, DVD. Clip collection began in 1956.
- Nymph (2007), 2 min, color, silent.
- Gift of Fire: Nineteen (Obscure) Frames that Changed the World (2007), 27:30 min, anaglyph 3-D color, surround sound.
- The Scenic Route (2008), 25 min, color and b&w, sound.
- 60 Seconds of Solitude in Year Zero, first segment.
- Seeking the Monkey King (2011), 39:42 min, color, 5.1 surround sound, HD video.
- Joys of Waiting for the Broadway Bus (2013), 4–part series, enhanced 3D film digital slides.
- A Primer in Sky Socialism (2013), color 3D film.

== Awards and accolades ==
He was a recipient of the 1994 American Film Institute's Maya Deren Award. In 2012 he received a Creative Capital Moving Image grant award. In 2014 he was named a United States Artists (USA) Fellow.

== Bibliography ==
- Pierson, Michele; James, David E.; Arthur, Paul, eds. (2011). Optic Antics: The Cinema of Ken Jacobs. Oxford University Press. ISBN 978-0-19-538497-0.
- Groo, Katherine; Flaig, Katherine, eds. (2015). New Silent Cinema. Routledge. ISBN 9781317819448.
