= 2004 New York Underground Film Festival =

These are the films shown at the 11th New York Underground Film Festival, held from March 10–16, 2004.

Film Name	Director	Type	Length	Notes
0 degrees	Jan Frederik Groot, Anna Abrahams	Experimental 35mm	11	
03/2003		Documentary 16mm	6	
30 Seconds Hate	Bryan Boyce	Experimental Video	1	
400 Pipes	Coan Nichols, Rick Charnoski	Short Video		
50 Ways to Set the Table	Judy Fiskin	Documentary Video	26	
9 is a Secret	Rankin Renwick	Experimental Video	6	
A Certain Kind of Death	Blue Hadeagh, Grover Babcock	Documentary Video	70	New York Premiere
A Few Good Dykes	Mocha Jean Herrup	Documentary Video	50	World Premiere
A Minor Movie	Jon Miner	Short Video		
A Quiet Moment with Richard	Matthew Etches	Documentary Video	6	
About Baghdad	Suzy Salamy, Maya Mikdashi, Sinan Antoon, Passam Haddad, Adam Shapiro	Documentary Video	15	
Afterlifers	Halflifers	Experimental Video	16	
American Nutria	Matt Mccormick	Documentary Video	11	
Aquarius	Kevin Jerome Everson	Experimental 16mm	2	
Autorickshaw	Andrew Blackwell	Experimental Video	8	
Birds	Steve Hall, Cathee Wilkins	Short Video	5	
Brave New York	Richard Sandler	Documentary Video	55	US Premiere
Bullfight	Kate Haug	Experimental 16mm	7	
California Telephone	Haruko Tanaka	Documentary 16mm	3	
Cats and Pants	Jennifer Matotek	Experimental Video	1	
Celebration of Lights	Jesse Mclean	Experimental 16mm	5	
Certain Women	Bobby Abate, Peggy Ahwesh	Feature Video	75	US Premiere
Cheap Ludes	Jeroen Moi, John Doornik	Short Video	3	
Chopin's Bicycle	Eric Dyer	Experimental Video	5	
Chopstick Bloody Chopstick	Shawn Durr, Wayne Yung	Short Video	15	
Cold Water	Dan Vellucci, Mark Gonzales	Short Video		
Concrete Monkey	Mike Regan	Short Video		
Confederation Park	Bill Brown	Documentary 16mm	30	
Cyclope	Lovid	Experimental Video	4	
Danzante	Sergio Batiz	Documentary 16mm	15	
Decay Hatching	Lovid	Experimental Video	2	
Decision 80	Jim Finn	Experimental Video	10	
Descente	Pierre Reimer	Experimental Video	5	
Dire Mastery	Bernard Roddy	Short 16mm	9	
dissolve	Aaron Valdez	Experimental 16mm	15	
Dr. Jekyll and Mr. Hyde	Paul Bush	Experimental Video	5	
Encinitas Realization	Chris Johanson, Tobin Yelland	Short Video		
Energy Country	Deborah Stratman	Experimental Video	14	
Equestrian	Michiel Van Bakel	Experimental 35mm	3	
Eric the Secret	Joe Quinn	Short Video	4	
Esophagus	James Fotopoulos	Feature Video	70	World Premiere
Famous Irish Americans	Roger Beebe	Experimental Video	8	
Fancy, Fancy Being Rich	Guy Maddin	Experimental 16mm On Video	5	
Figures in the Landscape	Thomas Comerford	Experimental 16mm	11	
Fleshpot on 42nd Street	Andy Milligan	Feature 35mm	76	
Forbidden Fruits	George Kuchar	Short Video	15	
From Pompeii to Xena	Kevin Jerome Everson	Experimental 16mm	5	
Fulton Fish Market	Mark Street	Documentary 35mm	12	
Gaijin	Kent Lambert	Experimental Video		
Gnargoyles’ Llama Nightmare	Dave Kaplan, Rob Collinson	Short Video		
Goldstein: The Trials of the Sultan of Smut	James Guardino	Documentary Video	73	World Premiere
Guru, The Mad Monk	Andy Milligan	Feature 35mm	62	
Hallowe'en	Kerstin Cmelka	Experimental 16mm	3	
Hambone	Steve Hall, Cathee Wilkins	Short Video	3	
Harry Potter Parking Lot	Jeff Krulik	Documentary Video	7	
Hillbilly Doomsday	Bob Ray	Short Video	15	
I Was Born But...	Roddy Bogawa	Documentary 16mm	90	World Premiere
Idiot's Brew	Antonin De Bemels	Experimental Video	10	
In the Shoes of the Dragon	Hrönn Sveinsdottir, Arni Sveinsson	Documentary Video	90	International Premiere
Intelligence Failures: Minutes 39–54	Benj Gerdes	Experimental Video	7	International Premiere
Jonathan Livingston Seagull	Richard Bach, Michael Knight, Dan Nazzareta, Jon Ehinger	Short Video		
Jours en Fleurs (Bloods, Guts and Blossoms)	Louise Bourque	Experimental 35mm	5	
King of Zines: The Concussion Documentary	Dave Amell	Short Video		
La Puppe	Timothy Greenberg	Short Video	9	
Las Historias Mas Sexy Del Mundo (aka The Sexiest Stories on Earth)	Eric Cheever	Short 16mm	15	
Learning Stalls: Lesson Plans	Darrin Martin, Torsten Z. Burns	Experimental Video	7	
Leche	Naomi Uman	Experimental 16mm	30	
Lick My Pussy, Dog	Steve Hall, Cathee Wilkins	Short Video	3	
Live Music Show: People Like Us		Feature Audio		
Live Music Show: Tree Wave		Feature Audio		
Loudmouth Collective/Ugly Duckling Presse	Joel Schlemowitz	Documentary 16mm	20	
Love and a '61	Nick Prevas	Documentary Video	22	
Lunch Break on the Xerox Machine	Marie Losier	Experimental 16mm	3	
Making Things Meaningful	Paul Tarragó	Short Video	8	
Mala Leche	Naomi Uman	Experimental 16mm	47	
Me and a Wall	Chris Satu	Experimental Video	3	
Mi Casa, Su Casa	Pierre Reimer	Experimental 35mm	9	
Moon in Gemini	Abbey Williams	Experimental Video	15	
Morzh/Walrus	Moira Tierney	Experimental 16mm	3	
Mountain State	Bill Brown	Documentary 16mm	20	
Mrs. Butterworth	Albert Ross	Short Video		
N Judah	Sam Green	Experimental 16mm	6	
Niche	Kelly Oliver	Experimental Video	5	
Not Too Much Remember	Tony Gault	Experimental 16mm	11	
Ode To Vert	Helen Stickler	Short Video		
Oil Wells: Sturgeon Road & 97th St.	Christina Battle	Experimental 16mm	3	
Old Glory	Andy Schocken	Documentary Video	7	
One Nation Under Tommy	Josh Gibson, Sallie Patrick, Nayeli Garci-Crespo, Michael Lahey, Chris Jolly	Animation Video	12	
Peep Show	J. X. Williams	Feature 16mm		US Premiere
Pictures from Dorothy	Kevin Jerome Everson	Experimental 16mm	6	
Pink Collared Capers	Don Goldberg	Short Video		
Pretty Things	Michael Lucid, Amanda Quinn	Short Video	15	
private_eyez.mid	Frankie Martin, Cory Arcangel	Experimental Video	3	
Proposal for New Video Transition:	Seth Price	Experimental Video	8	
Psych-Burn	J. X. Williams	Short 16mm		US Premiere
Rejected or Unused Clips Arranged in Order For Lauren, Ed and Kendra	Seth Price	Experimental Video	10	
Reminisce	Ward Howarth	Short Video		
Ringolevio	Mat Mcgrath	Short Video		
Robert Beck Memorial Cinema: Hex	Marie Losier, Bradley Eros, Marianne Shaneen, Ghen Zando-Dennis, Glen Fogel, Brian Frye, Joel Schlemowitz	Feature 16mm		
Roswell	Bill Brown	Documentary 16mm	20	
Satan Claus	J. X. Williams	Short 16mm		US Premiere
Six Videos About Tourism	Robert A. Greene	Experimental Video	13	
Skating Through The Ashes	Ben Galland, Billy Hanley	Short Video		
Soldiers Under Command	Matt Luem, Greg Fiering	Documentary Video	18	
SOS	Paul Schiek, Chris Duncan	Short Video		
Stories from the Genome	Rachel Mayeri	Documentary Video	15	
Strained Andromeda Strain	Les Leveque	Short Video	7	
Strategic Cyber Defense	Dara Greenwald	Experimental Video	4	
Structural Filmwaste. Dissolution 1	Siegfried A. Fruhauf	Experimental Video	4	
Super-Max	Jim Finn	Short Video	13	
Susquehanna	Lovid	Experimental Video	2	
Sweet Pea Drowning in Frivolity: A Character Study	Rebecca Conroy	Documentary 16mm On Video	10	
Tater Tots	Giuseppe Andrews	Feature Video	70	World Premiere
The Bee Hive	Lee Lynch	Short Super-8 On Video	3	
The Body Beneath	Andy Milligan	Feature 35mm	85	
The Graceless	David Sherman	Experimental Video	11	
The Light	Brian Doyle	Experimental Video	10	
The Manson Family	Jim Van Bebber	Feature 35mm	93	US Premiere
The Nest	James Fotopoulos	Feature 16mm	78	New York Premiere
The Oasis Story:	I.F. Svenonius	Animation Video	5	
The Virgin Sacrifice	J. X. Williams	Short 16mm		US Premiere
The World's Best Drug	Travis Foster Kopach, Kean Adam Levreault	Short Video		
This Ain't No Heartland	Andreas Horvath	Documentary 16mm	56	US Premiere
Travis	Kelly Reichardt	Experimental Super-8 On Video	12	
Underworld Cinema: The Life of J.X. Williams	J. X. Williams	Feature 16mm		US Premiere
Unknown Passage: The Dead Moon Story	Jason Summers, Kate Fix	Documentary Video	70	World Premiere
Untitled Archival Medical Film	Unknown	Documentary 16mm	15	
Untitled Flicker	Huckleberry Lain	Experimental 16mm	2	
Untitled Space #1	Lili Chin	Experimental Video	4	
Vice Presents: The Best of TV Carnage		Feature Video		
Violence Against Fruits	Tintin Wulia	Experimental Video	5	
Visitation Rights	George Kuchar	Short Video	18	
Watch	Robert Todd, Michael Dwyer	Documentary Video	13	
Wavelength 3-D	Ben Coonley	Experimental Video	45	
We Interrupt This Empire...	Whispered Media, Video Activist Network, Sf Indymedia	Documentary Video	52	New York Premiere
Weeping Willow	Hiromi Yoshida	Experimental 16mm	6	
Wet Dreams and False Images	Jesse Epstein	Documentary Video	11	
What the 70's Really Looked Like	Matt Mccormick	Feature 16mm		
Whole	Melody Gilbert	Documentary Video	55	New York Premiere
Wizard People, Dear Reader	Brad Neely	Feature 35mm	150	World Premiere
Übermax	Jim Finn	Experimental Video	1	
You Got That, Captain	William Vernon Lemon III	Short Video		
Your Weekend Forecast, with Nora Gamble	Eileen Maxson	Short Video	6	

== See also ==
- New York Underground Film Festival site
- 2004 Festival Archive
