= 2006 New York Underground Film Festival =

2006 film festival edition

These are the films shown at the 13th New York Underground Film Festival, held from March 8–14, 2006

Film Name	Director	Type	Length	Notes
A Short Film	Kelsey Kleiman	Short Video	2:19	
America's Biggest Dick	Bryan Boyce		3:00	
Animal Mother	Jasmin Way	Documentary Video	28:20	
Ariel Pink: Bloody Bagonias	Nicolas Amato		:30	
Ariel Pink: Beverly Kills	Nicolas Amato		2:15	
Around Sanford	Jeff Erbach	Short 16mm	10:30	
August in the Empire State	Gabriel Rhodes, Keefe Murren, co-directed by Michael Galinsky	Documentary Video	70:00	World Premiere
b-alles	Marina Gioti	Experimental Video	2:00	
BARR: Lights Out	Donovan Vim Crony			
Battle of the Child Molesters	Ivan Van Norman	Short Video	5:02	
Because of the War	Jennet Thomas	Experimental Video	13:30	
Ben Coonley	James Fotopoulos	Experimental Video	4:47	
Binge Drinking	Anonymous Documentary	Video	5:00	
Black Mountain: Druganaut	Heather Trawick			
Blockade	Sergei Loznitsa	Experimental 35 mm on Video	50:00	
Bobby Birdman: Steal Yr Face	Jona Bechtolt		3:30	
Bonus: Tone Trad	Jamie Potter			
Buffalo Common	Bill Brown		23:00	
Bulldog in the Whitehouse	Todd Verow	Feature Video	80:00	
Casiotone for the Painfully Alone: The Subway Home	David Enos, Paul Stepahin			
Chapters 1-12 of R. Kelly's Trapped in the Closet Synced and Played Simultaneously	Michael Bell-Smith	Experimental Video	4:27	
Cinnamon	Kevin Everson	Feature Video	71:00	East Coast Premiere
Comets on Fire: Beneath the Ice Age	Elise Irving			
Commercial	Gustáv Hámos	Experimental Video	9:00	
Corpses of Waco (Indian Jewelry): In Love with Loving				
Cot Damn	Njena Jarvis	Short Video	4:00	
Cox and Combs	Brad Neely	Animation Videdo	2:25	
Crazy Girl	Jesper Nordahl	Documentary Video	11:70	
Crime in Choir: The Hoop	Tim Miller		4:00	
Dangerous Men	John Rad	Feature 35mm	80:00	New York Premiere
Danielson: A Family Movie	JL Aronson	Documentary Video	105:00	New York Premiere
Day Is Done (Extracurricular Activity Projective Reconstructions #2- #32)	Mike Kelley	Feature Video	180:00	World Theatrical Premiere
Deerhoof: Wrong Time Capsule	Martha Colburn			
Dialogue #3 (That's not for me to say)	Ruth Maclennan	Experimental Video	11:00	
dirtyglitter 1: Damien	Aron Kantor	Narrative Video	14:00	
Drosophilia	Ruth Maclennan	Animation Video	4:00	
Dynasty Handbag: I Can't Wait	Jibz Cameron, Sue Costibile, Indra Dunis			
Eats Tapes: Pteryd	Nate Boyce			
Faith N Chaos	Robert Banks	Experimental 35mm	2:30	
Fever Dream	Programmed by Rebecca Cleman			
Frisbee: The Life and Death of a Hippie Preacher	David Di Sabatino	Documentary Video	105:00	East Coast Premiere
Full Effect	Jeremy Bailey	Experimental Video	2:20	
Get OVER It, Honey	Flavio Flaviani	Animation Video	10:00	
Getting Stronger Everyday	Miranda July		7:00	
Glitches, Hitches, and Hiccups 2	Susan Giles	Experimental Video	2:58	
Good Times: Vol. 1	Ken Hegan	Short 35mm	3:05	
Hot Throbbing Cock	Tung-Wang Wu	Short Video	15:00	
Hymn of Reckoning	Kent Lambert	Experimental Video	7:00	
I Went to Work Today, I Don't Think I'll Go Tomorrow	Julia Klaering and Nils Olger	Narrative Video	9:00	
If You See Something, Say Something	Josh Safdie	Short Video	3:30	
Interkosmos	Jim Finn	Feature 16 mm on Video	71:00	US Premiere
Intersecticide	Tara Mateik	Experimental Video	7:03	
Invertisement #1	Bryan Boyce	Experimental Video	0:41	
It Was a Crushing Defeat	Matt McCormick			
Johnny Jimmy Joe	Michael Lucid and Amanda Barrett	Short Video	1:00	
Killing Babyface	John Skoog	Experimental Video	2:30	
Lay Down Tracks	Brigid McCaffrey and Danielle Lombardi	Documentary 16mm	60:00	World Premiere
Let Me Count the Ways: Minus 10, 9, 8, 7...	Leslie Thornton	Experimental Video	19:40	
Let's Get It On	Kirsten Stoltmann	Experimental Video	6:00	
Little Spirits	Cecelia Condit	Short Video	8:30	
Mae Shi: Chop2	David Park		1:00	
Making Me Happy	Shiri Bar-On	Documentary Video	9:20	
Malibu	Mark Ther	Short Video	3:42	
Mark Roth	Animal Charm		5:00	
Miss Krimi	Mark Ther	Experimental Video	5:30	
Mister Warning	C.C. and B.N.	Short Video	2:30	
Mom & Pop Shop	Robert Todd and Michael Dwyer	Documentary Video	41:00	
Momma's Boy	John Bryant	Narrative	16:03	
N Judah 5:30	Sam Green		4:00	
No Bra "Munchausen"	Susanne Oberbeck and Guy Nisbett	Short Video	2:45	
November	Hito Steyerl	Documentary Video	25:00	
Numbers: Fuck You Garage	Eric Landmark			
Oh, Daniel	C.C. and B.N.	Short Video	3:10	
Okhotnik (The Hunter)	Hitoshi Hirano	Short 35mm	28:10	
Palestine Blues	Nida Sinnokrot	Documentary Video	80:00	World Premiere
Panels for the Walls of the World	Stan Vanderbeek	Experimental 16mm	8:00	
Paul and the Badger - Episode #1	Paul Tarrago	Short Video	11:20	
Paying Tax is Sexy	Eva Linder	Documentary Video	10:43	
Phase Chancellor (members Matmos): excerpt from live performance	Phase Chancellor			
Portrait #1: Cascadia Terminal	Rankin Renwick	Experimental 16 mm on Video	6:00	
Puce Moment	Kenneth Anger	Experimental 16mm	6:30	
Punk House	Matt Reilly		6:30	
Push {H}it (Abe's the S Stands for Suppa Glitch Out for all You Sukkas! Mix) from Universal Acid	Marisa Olson, Abe Linkoln			
Relax!!!	Flavio Flaviani	Short Video	5:00	
Removed	Naomi Uman		7:00	
Rhinoplasty	Yoshua Okon	Experimental Video	40:00	
Rite of the Black Sun	Bradley Eros	Animation Video	10:00	
Serendipity, 1967	Anonymous	Experimental 8 mm on Video	6:30	
Sexy Midi: Wizards	Kelly Sears			
Shoot	Joe Nanashe	Experimental Video	2:25	
Skating Becomes Vermoutha	David Ozanich	Narrative 16mm	23:00	
Space Computer	C.C. and B.N	Short Video	2:40	
Sports	Robert Greene	Experimental Video	13:00	
Starter Set: In Can Can Descent	Lindsay Beamish			
States of Unbelonging	Lynne Sachs in collaboration with Nir Zats	Documentary Video	63:00	
Sword Boy	Tristan Orchard	Animation Video	5:00	
Tales From The Vertical City	Morgan Currie	Documentary Video	13:00	
Tales of Mere Existence	Lev Yilmaz	Animation Video	7:00	
The Abominable Freedom	Torsten Zenas Burns and Darrin Martin	Experimental Video	41:00	
The Chilling, Thrilling Sounds of the HauntedHouse #1: The Very Long Fuse	Steve Hall and Cathee Wilkins	Short Video	4:10	
The Chilling, Thrilling Sounds of the HauntedHouse #2: The Birds	Steve Hall and Cathee Wilkins	Short Video	5:25	
The Chilling, Thrilling Sounds of the HauntedHouse #3: Your Pet Cat	Steve Hall and Cathee Wilkins	Short Video	4:25	
The Elk Hotel	Skye Thorstenson and Daniel Paul Bates	Feature Video	87:00	World Premiere
The Gossip: Standing in the Way of Control	Wyld File			
The Maryland Trilogy				
The Movie Set	William Ault	Experimental 16mm	10:00	
The Octopus of Infinity				
The Ontological Cowboy	Marie Losier	Documentary 16mm	10:00	
The Other Side	Bill Brown	Documentary 16mm	41:00	
The Pig	James Fotopoulos	Experimental Video	3:00	
The Samantha Smith Project	Irene Lusztig	Documentary Video	50:25	
The Story of Birgitta	Eva Linder	Documentary Video	34:00	
The Subconscious Art of Graffiti Removal	Matt McCormick		16:00	
The Underminer	Todd Downing	Short Video	5:55	
The Wind	Kirsten Stoltmann	Short Video	1:45	
Toilet	Chris Chiappa	Experimental Video	2:30	
Towlines	Matt McCormick	Documentary 16 mm on Video	22:00	
Trinity	James Fotopoulos	Feature Video	108:00	World Premiere
Tussle: Entre Chien et Loup	Alison Childs			
Twenty Minutes	Kevin Jerome Everson	Experimental 35mm	3:00	
Two-Week Vacation	Kevin Jerome Everson	Experimental 16mm	1:16	
Untied	Deborah Stratman		3:00	
Valley Girl	Michelle O'Marah	Feature Video	113:00	World Theatrical Premiere
We Saw it - Like a Flash	Ruth Maclennan	Experimental Video	45:00	
White Rainbow: Full Spectrum Healing Center	Adam Forkner		3:00	
Why Overweight Preteen Girls with Glasses Often Like Unicorns	Jennifer Matotek	Experimental Video	4:15	
Yodeling Lesson	Rankin Renwick		5:00	

== See also ==
- New York Underground Film Festival site
- 2006 Festival Archive
