= 2001 New York Underground Film Festival =

These are the films shown at the 8th New York Underground Film Festival, held from March 7–13, 2001.

Film Name	Director	Type	Length	Notes
...An Incredible Simulation	Jeff Economy & Darren Hacker	Documentary Video	60:00	East Coast Premiere
_relifted	tinhoko		7:00	
A Perfect Ass	Rankin Renwick	Experimental Video		
American Graffity	Seth Price	Experimental 16mm on video	16:00	
Anything for the Ladies	Ingivil Giske & Line K. Lyngstadaas	Documentary Video	24:30	
Audiovisions: New Videos + Music from Austria		Experimental Video	62:00	US Premiere
Aus	Skot, Christian Fennesz	video	4:00	
Automatic Meat Probe	Shawn P. Morrissey	Experimental 16mm	5:00	
Back Against the Wall	James Fotopoulos	Feature 16mm	94:00	World Premiere
Beauty	Bibb Bailey	Documentary 16mm	3:00	
Bouncing in the Corner #36DDD	Dara Greenwald	Experimental Video	2:30	
Breathe	James Fotopolous	Experimental 16mm	00:34	
Burning Man: The Burning Sensation	Alex Nohe	Documentary 35mm	75:00	
Burnside	Corey Wade	Documentary Video	6:00	
Cat Number Six is a Coward	Jerome Gariepy	Short 16mm	8:00	
Coffin Joe: The Strange World of Jose Mojica Marins	André Barcinski & Ivan Finotti	Documentary Video	66:00	East Coast Premiere
Come Softly	Bobby Abate	Experimental Video	11:00	
Communication	Zakery Weiss	Experimental Video	6:15	
comp.tot4 (romutation)	reMI	video	16:00	
Crazy	Bobby Abate	Experimental Video	13:00	
Curse of the Seven Jackals	Chris Jolly	Feature 16mm on video	60:00	New York Premiere
DaumEB	Ben Russell	Experimental 16mm	7:00	
Dirty Girls	Michael Lucid	Documentary Video	18:00	
Do It	Jonas Mekas	Documentary Video	3:00	
Down to the Crux	Michael Lucio Sternbach	Documentary Video	45:00	East Coast Premiere
Drink Me	Lisa Barnstone	Experimental Super 8 on video	4:00	
Drop That Baby Again	Karen Yasinsky	Animation 16mm on video	5:00	
Drowning	James Fotopoulos	Experimental 16mm	2:30	
Election Collectibles	Bryan Boyce	Short Video	4:45	
Encinitas Realization	Chris Johanson	Short 16mm on video	3:00	
Film Sketches (The Stewardess, Pizza Man & Food Critic)	Shannon Plumb	Experimental Video	7:00	
Flip Foot	Paula Kinsel	Experimental Video	3:00	
Forest-Views	Bart Vegter	Experimental 35mm (silent)	18:00	
Forever Bottom!	Nguyen Tan Hoang	Experimental Video	4:00	
Freaks on the Beach	Chase Lounge	Short Super 8 on video	3:00	
Fucked in the Face	Shawn Durr	Feature Video	70:00	
Gang Tapes	Adam Ripp	Feature Video	81:00	East Coast Premiere
Goldfish & Sunflowers	Robert C. Banks, Jr.	Experimental 35mm.	9:00	
Gone	Cecilia Dougherty	Experimental 2-Channel Video	37:00	World Premiere
Greenidge Meantime	Oliver Griffin	Documentary Video	8:00	
Helium	Patty Chang	Experimental Video	6:00	
Hey, Happy!	Noam Gonick	Feature 35mm	75:00.	East Coast Premiere
His Holy Prepuce	Jane Gang	Experimental Super 8 on video	5:00	
Hot Broads	Brittany Hague	Short Super 8 & 16mm on video	17:00	
Hot Trash	Rick Spears	Short Video	10:00	
I Like Men	Anne McGuire	Animation Video	00:40	
I Only Have Eyes for You	Tom Jarmusch & Fabienne Gautier	Experimental Video	7:51	
In Love with Love	Brian Frye	Experimental 16mm	3:00	
In the Cycling Park	Masaki Hosokawa	Short 16mm.	19:00	
In the Ocean	Frank Scheffer	Documentary Video	55:00	
Indonesia	Rick Charnoski	Documentary Super-8 on video	8:00	
Instrument	JFCrgen Moritz	video	5:00	
It Did It	Peter Brinson	Experimental Video	17:00	
Jeffrey's Hollywood Screen Trick	Todd Downing	Animation 35mm	10:00	
Jerks, Don't Say "Fuck"	Zhao Liang	Experimental Video	4:00	
Jimmy Jang Jang	Monroe Bardot	Short Video	3:00	
Jogging	Josef Dabernig	Short 35mm	11:00	
Jugular	Fernanda Ramos	Short 35mm	4:40	
Karate Ruler	Anthony DiSalvo	Short Video	15:30	
Kukla Fran + Adolf	Monroe Bardot	Short Video	3:00	
letters, notes	Stephanie Barber	Experimental 16mm (silent).	4:15	
Looking for Willie	Tom Davis	Documentary Video	6:00	
Lucky	Bobby Abate	Experimental Video	13:00	
Maldoror	Kerri Sharp, Filmgruppe Abgedreht, Caroline Kennedy, Duncan Reekie, Filmgruppe Chaos, Colette Rouhier, Steven Eastwood, Jenigerfilm, Andrew Coram, Hant Film, Paul Tarraga, Jennet Thomas	Feature 16mm	100:00	US Premiere
Meditation #5	Auguste Varkalis	Experimental 16mm (silent)	6:00	
Micromoth	Julie Murray	Experimental 16mm	6:00	
Mind Control Made Easy	Carey Burtt	Short 16mm	13:00	
Monday with the Martins	Jeffrey Erbach	Experimental 16mm	3:30	
More or Less	Mirjam Unger	Short 35mm	18:00	
Mother and Son	Matthew Silver	Short Video	15:45	
Mountain Trip	Siegfried A. Fruhauf	Experimental 16mm	4:00	
Movies for the Blind: Episode 3	Jeff Perkins	Experimental/Performance	70:00	
Mutant Aliens	Bill Plympton	Animation 35mm	80:00	East Coast Premiere
Nature's Assistant: Short Films and Video	Rankin Renwick	Experimental Video	60:00	
notdef./version one	maia./notdef	video	4:00	
Now Let Us Praise American Leftists	Paul Chan	Experimental Video	2:30	
o.T.	Michaela Grill, Takeshi Fumimoto	video	5:00	
Overfart	Ben Pointeker	video	6:00	
pedestrian errors	Cheryl Weaver	Experimental 16mm and Super-8 on video (silent)	3:00	
Pennies For Beer Short	Matthew T.	Super-8 on video	3:50	
Period	Stom Sogo	Experimental Super-8	27:00	
Pie Fight '69	Christian Bruno & Sam Wells	Documentary 16mm	8:00	
Pikkulzz	Xan Price	Experimental Video	6:00	
Pixador	Guiomar Ramos	Documentary Video	23:00	
Planet of the Vamps	George Kuchar	Short Video	25:00	
Plaster Caster: A Cockumentary Film	Jessica Villines	Documentary Video	103:00	World Premiere
Pleasureland	Bryan Poyser	Short 16mm	18:00	
Private Movie	Naomi Uman	Experimental 16mm	6:00	
Psych-Burn	J. X. Williams	Experimental 16mm	3:00	
Punking Out	Maggi Carson, Juliusz Kossakowski & Frederic Shore	Documentary 16mm on video	25:00	
Quicksilver Boy	Anonymous	Documentary Video	2:00	
Receiver	Jon Leone	Documentary Video	20:00	
Rejected	Don Hertzfeldt	Animation 35mm on video	9:17	
rewind	n:ja, shabotinski	video	5:00	
Routemaster - Theatre of the Motor	Ilppo Pohjola	Experimental 35mm	17:00	
Ruins	Jesse Lerner	Feature 16mm	78:00	
Santora	JFCrgen Moritz, Norbert Pfaffenbichler, Christian Fennes	video	4:00	
Satan Was a Lady	Doris Wishman	Feature 35mm on video	80:00	World Premiere
Scary Larry	Ron Beck	Documentary Video	11:30	
Scrotum Maximum	Derk Gerbode, Jan Braren & Rickmer Braren	Short Video	3:46	
Selections from Newpopart.com - "Boredom"	Randy Janson	Experimental Video	3:00	
Self-reflecting	Kirsten Stoltmann	Experimental Video	00:55	
Sharony!	Jennet Thomas	Experimental Video	10:00	
Short Film Series (excerpt)	Guy Sherwin	Experimental 16mm (silent)	2:00	
Shudder (top and bottom)	Michael Gitlin	Experimental 16mm	3:00	
Skateboarding Saved My Life (trailer)	Rob Rundquist, Woody Donahue & Mark "Mavis" Davis	Documentary Film/video	3:00	
slowfall	Cheryl Weaver	Experimental Super-8 on video loop (silent)	5:00	
Some New Romantic / t.v. sounds	Adrianne Jorge	Documentary Super-8 on video	9:00	
Sonic Genetics [New York underground re:mix]	Ian Kerkhof, Frank Scheffer, Dick Tuinder, Gerard Van Der Kaap & Philipp Virus	Experimental Video.	60:00	World Premiere
Sonnenland	Paul Divjak	Documentary 16mm	16:00	
Spit	Jeremy Drummond	Experimental Video	2:27	
Star Spangled Baby Doll	Skizz Cyzyk	Documentary Video	4:00	
Stoked: The Rise and Fall of Gator trailer	Helen Stickler	Documentary Film/video	3:00	
Sub!	Jesse Schmal	Animation 35mm	8:30	
Sugar	Lisa Barnstone	Experimental Super-8 on video	7:00	
The Burley Boys Animation	Jesse Brown	Video.	2:00	
The Clandestine Nautical Carnality of Short I	Tony Conrad	Audio composition CD Recording	3:00	
The Curse	Jacqueline Garry	Feature 16mm	83:00	World Premiere
The Escapades of Madame X	Kerry Laitala & Isable Reichert	Experimental 16mm	10:00	
The Last Olive	Alicia Scherson	Short 16mm	17:00	
The Lost Bundefjord Expedition	Matt Holm	Short	16:00	
The Magic of Radio	Greta Snider	Documentary 16mm	23:00	
The Moschops	Jim Trainor	Animation 16mm	13:00	
The Most Dangerous Game	Stephen Marshall	Documentary Video	8:45	
The Navel	Isaac Mathes	Feature Video	78:00	East Coast Premiere.
the residual artifacts of communication	Richard Mathias Sandoval	Experimental 35mm	6:30	
The Seedling (trailer/excerpt)	Thomas Campbell	Documentary 16mm on video	6:00	
The Stench of Satan	George Kuchar	Short Video	40:00	
The Sunshine	Phil Bertelsen	Documentary 16mm	30:00	
The Tumultuous Tears of Dorothy Dolittle	Derek Curl	Short Video	15:49	
Things to Remember About Daumier	Matthew Konicek	Experimental 16mm	4:15	
Three Legged	John Wood & John Harrison	Experimental Video	3:00	
Tokyo Escalator	Naoko Nozawa	Short Video	11:30	
Transistor	Michaela Schwentner	Experimental Video	6:00	
traxdata	JFCrgen Moritz, Norbert Pfaffenbichler, Christian Fennesz	video	4:00	
True Confessions of an Artist	Kirsten Stoltmann	Experimental Video	5:00	
Uncle Eugene	Aaron Lubarsky	Documentary 16mm on video	14:00	
Unterwerk	Dariusz Kreczek	video	2:00	
Whack	Kent Lambert	Experimental Video	6:00	
What About Me: The Rise of the Nihilist Spasm Band	Zev Asher	Documentary Video	79:00	US Premiere
Wired Angel	Sam Wells	Feature 16mm	95:00	East Coast Premiere.
You Can't Keep a Good Snake Down	Moira Tierney & Masha Godovannaya	Experimental 16mm	4:00	
