= MPG =

MPG or mpg may refer to:

- .mpg, one of a number of file extensions for MPEG-1 or MPEG-2 audio and video compression
- MPG (gene), a human gene coding for N-methylpurine DNA glycosylase
- M.P.G., a 1969 album by Marvin Gaye
- Manual pulse generator, a device normally associated with numerically controlled machinery
- Mark-Paul Gosselaar, American actor
- Matías Pérez García (born 1984), Argentine footballer
- Max-Planck-Gesellschaft (Max Planck Society), a German non-profit research organization
- Media Planning Group, former name of Havas Media, a media division of Havas
- Miles per gallon, a measurement of fuel economy in automobiles, boats and other motorized vehicles
- Milford Proving Ground, one of several General Motors Proving Grounds
- Minutes per game in basketball
- Monopotassium glutamate, a flavor enhancer
- Motor Press Guild, a non-profit association for professionals within the motoring press
- Multiplayer game
- Multiplayer video game
- Multi-touch, physics and gestures, a type of computer touch screen
- Music Producers Guild, an association of music producers in the United Kingdom
- MPG: Motion Picture Genocide, 1997 film
