= 2005 New York Underground Film Festival =

These are the films shown at the 12th New York Underground Film Festival, held from March 9–15, 2005

Film Name	Director	Type	Length	Notes
5 Video Hits	Kent Lambert	Experimental Video	6	
A Family Finds Entertainment	Ryan Trecartin	Experimental Video	41	World Premiere
A Gentleman's Agreement	Fabrice Gygi	Experimental Video	7	
A Thirsty Man	Amir Shabab Razavian	Experimental Video	3	
All About a Girl	Cecelia Condit	Experimental Video	5	
All I Can Be	Erica Hill	Experimental Video		
All Right	Aleesa Cohene	Experimental Video	7	International Premiere
America's Biggest Dick	Bryan Boyce	Experimental Video	3	
Annemiek	Rineke Dijkstra	Experimental Video	4	
Anodyne	Sheri Wills	Experimental 16mm	4	
Ausziehen	Jochen Dehn	Experimental Video	7	
Baby's Room	Rosy Boyer	Experimental 16mm	4	
Beat Time	Joost Rekveld	Experimental Video	9	
Big Bug Attack	Martha Colburn	Animation Video	3	
Big Screen Version	Aaron Valdez	Experimental Video	3	
Big Shtick	Courtney Egan	Experimental Video	3	
Bigger Better	Ton Meijdam	Experimental Video	5	
Boxes, Jesus and Sandwiches	Jennifer Matotek	Experimental Video	1	
Buried in the Backyard	Sarah Prior, Monica Bigler	Documentary Video	30	
bye bye bye	Jeremy Bailey	Experimental Video	5	
Captain Milkshake	Richard Crawford	Feature 35mm	89	New York Premiere
Carfire	John Ayala, John Furgason	Documentary Video	17	
Carnival in Rio		Documentary Video	5	
Circus	Swann Thommen, Annelore Schneider, Claude Piguet	Experimental Video	2	
Code 33	David Bellinson, Michael Galinsky, Suki Hawley, Zachary Werner	Documentary Video	80	New York Premiere
Coded Language (DJ Krust)	Ben Dempsey, Joe Dempsey	Experimental Video	6	
Cone Eater	Takeshi Murata	Animation Video	4	
Danse Macabre	Persijn Broersen	Experimental Video	3	
Definitions of Art	Yuri A	Experimental 16mm On Video	5	
DISED 2604, Prof. Catherine Poplar	Eileen Maxson	Experimental Video	5	
Don Quatro	Alexander Herzog	Experimental Video	3	
don't leave without news	Christine Khalafian	Experimental 16mm	22	
Don't Mouse Around	Jeremy Bailey	Experimental Video	2	
Don't You Bring Me Down Today	Keith Wilson	Experimental Video	4	
Double Dummy	Jennet Thomas	Experimental Video	6	
Dramaturgische Ikonologie	Jose Miguel Biscaya	Experimental Video	5	
Dream Invasion	Jackie Martin	Animation Video	1	
el moro	Jim Finn	Experimental Video	2	
Electrocute Your Stars	Marie Losier	Experimental 16mm	8	
Exist: not a protest film	Esther Bell	Feature Video	80	New York Premiere
Exoticore	Nicolas Provost	Experimental 35mm	27	US Premiere
Fabel	Mariska Van Gelder	Experimental Video	3	
Five	Vas Van Koolwijk	Experimental Video	3	
Floods, Ghosts, and Contamination	Jenny Stark, Mark Yzaguirre	Documentary 16mm On Video	13	
Flowergirls	Robert Todd	Documentary 16mm	14	
Folk Music and Documentary	Seth Price	Experimental Video	5	
Folklore in Landscape	Arno Coenen, Rene Bosma	Experimental Video	3	
Foo-Foo Dust	Gina Levy, Eric Johnson	Documentary Video	37	
Freak Magnet	Kellie Mcgregor	Experimental Video		International Premiere
Getting Nowhere Faster	Tiffany Morgan, Nicole Morgan, Lori Damiano, Lisa Whitaker	Feature Video	45	
Getting to Homebase: The All American Pastime	Irena Fayngold	Experimental Video		
Grand Luncheonette	Peter Sillen	Documentary 35mm	4	International Premiere
Grounded	Matt Mccormick	Documentary 16mm On Video	4	
Harmony	Jim Trainor	Animation 16mm	12	
Heartzburst	Lovid	Experimental Video	4	
Hephaestus of the Airshaft	Jeanne Liotta	Experimental Video	3	
Here After	Patrick Jolly, Rebecca Trost, Inger Lise Hansen	Experimental 35mm	12	
High School Record	Ben Wolfinsohn	Feature Video	90	New York Premiere
How to Get Rid of Head Lice	Erica Norman	Experimental Video		
I am a Boyband	Benny Nemerofsky Ramsay	Experimental Video	5	
I'd Rather Be Dead Than Live in This World	Andrew Semans	Short 16mm On Video	17	
Invisible Cities	Julio Soto	Experimental Video	6	
It Could Happen To You	Elizabeth Henry	Experimental 16mm On Video	8	
It Only Takes a Second		Short Video	3	
Kings of the Sky	Deborah Stratman	Documentary Video	68	
la ardilla	Jim Finn	Experimental Video	2	
Land Marked/Marquette	Thomas Comerford	Experimental 16mm	23	
Let the Good Times Roll	Stanya Kahn, Harry Dodge	Experimental Video	15	
Life is for Living		Short Video	3	
Living a beautiful life	Corinna Schnitt	Experimental Video	13	
Long After The Thrill	Erika Robo	Experimental Video		
Look at Me	Peter Stel	Experimental Video	3	
Lovely Lonely	Ariana Hamidi	Animation 16mm	2	
Lucky 7	Roberta Beck Memorial Cinema	Experimental 16mm		
Manager's Corner	Skizz Cyzyk	Animation 16mm	2	
Manimation	Clare Rojas	Animation Video	1	
Mercenaries!	Robert Banks	Experimental 35mm	3	
Miles Above	Michael Welt	Documentary Video	25	
Milk and Honey	Kate Mccabe	Experimental 16mm	16	
Monologue Exterieur	Francien Van Everdingen	Experimental 16mm	2	
Mulberry Commons	Michael Lucid, Amanda Barrett	Short Video	4	
My Mother's Pants	Mary Addison Hackett	Experimental Video		
My Sisters' Friends Always Seemed So Old	Ted Passon	Experimental Video	5	
Nate Preston, King of Portland	Andrew Dickson	Documentary Video	7	
Neighbors	John Rose	Documentary Video	5	
New School Union Diary	Joel Schlemowitz	Documentary 16mm	30	
Newspaper Only	Carola Dertnig	Experimental Video	1	
Not 360	Ra Di Martino	Experimental 35mm	7	
Nuthin' But the Blues	Rebecca Conroy	Documentary 16mm On Video	7	
Oh My God	John Bryant	Short Video	10	
Papillon d'amour	Nicolas Provost	Experimental Video	4	International Premiere
Pecking Disorder	Sara Kaye	Experimental Video		
PFFR: Legacy 2	PFFR	Feature Video		International Premiere
Planet of the Arabs	Jacqueline Salloum	Short Video	9	
Playground	Lauren Madow	Documentary Super-8 On Video	13	
Preserving Cultural Traditions in a Period of Instability	John Ford	Experimental Video	3	
Promised Land	Nora Meyer	Documentary Video	27	
PYT	Tara Mateik	Experimental Video	3	
Rap	Sarah Kuhn	Experimental 16mm	7	
Reckless Eyeballing	Christopher Harris	Experimental 16mm	13	
Resident of Earth	Paul Tarrago	Experimental Video	15	
Roberta Beck Memorial Cinema Presents: Lucky 7		Feature 16mm		
Sans Simon	Cory Arcangel	Experimental Video	5	
Sarah Nye	Sarah Hanssen	Experimental Video		
SET-4	Jan Van Neunen	Experimental Video	3	
Shit Eat Boy	Bobby Langlais	Documentary Video	10	
Soothsayer	Bobby Abate	Experimental Video	14	
Spicebush	Kevin Jerome Everson	Feature Video	70	
SSSkull	Lovid	Experimental Video	7	
Strongest Man	Jeremy Bailey	Experimental Video	4	
Sugar	Patrick Jolly, Reynold Reynolds	Feature 35mm	80	New York Premiere
Sugar and Spice	Rose Dabbs	Experimental 16mm	2	
Sunday	Justine Haemmerli	Experimental Video		
Sundowning	Rob Kennedy	Experimental Video	5	
T.S.H.	Jesse Lerner	Experimental 16mm	6	
Take My Life Please or A List of Things to Do Today in One Act	Kelly Oliver, Keary Rosen	Experimental Video	5	
The Ant Hill	James Fotopoulos	Feature Video	60	World Premiere
The Bats	Jim Trainor	Animation 16mm	8	
The Bear Hunter	Mary Robertson	Documentary Video	13	
The Birdpeople	Michael Gitlin	Documentary 16mm	61	
The Fetishist	Jim Trainor	Animation 16mm	38	
The Forest for the Trees: Judi Bari v. the FBI	Bernadine Mellis	Documentary Video	53	
The Heart Is Deceitful Above All Things	Asia Argento	Feature 35mm	97	New York Premiere
The Magic Kingdom	Jim Trainor	Short 16mm	7	
The Moschops	Jim Trainor	Animation 16mm	13	
The Ordovicians	Jim Trainor, Lisa Barcy	Animation 16mm	5	
The Party	Abigail Child	Documentary Video	21	
The Rock Music	Victor Alimpiev, Sergey Vishnevsky	Experimental Video	7	
The Slow Escape	Sativa Peterson	Experimental Video		
The Stairway at St Paul's	Jeroen Offerman	Experimental Video	8	
The Student Nurses	Stephanie Rothman	Feature 16mm	85	
The Velvet Vampire	Stephanie Rothman	Feature 16mm	82	
The Will of Dean Snider	Jaime Kibben	Documentary Video	60	New York Premiere
Towlines	Matt Mccormick	Documentary 16mm On Video	22	
transit	Takeshi Inamura	Documentary Super-8 On Video	11	
Under Foot & Overstory	Jason Livingston	Experimental 16mm	34	
Unicorn	Candice Lin	Animation Video	1	
Video Paint 1.0	Jeremy Bailey	Experimental Video	3	
Volcanica	Torsten Z. Burns, Darrin Martin	Experimental Video	9	
What Is It?	Crispin Hellion Glover	Feature 35mm	72	New York Premiere
Who's Your True Love	Karen Yasinsky	Animation 16mm On Video	8	

== See also ==
- New York Underground Film Festival site
- 2005 Festival Archive
