= 2007 New York Underground Film Festival =

These are the films shown at the 14th New York Underground Film Festival, held from March 28 - April 3, 2007.

Film Name	Director	Type	Length	Notes
(Tommy-Chat Just E-mailed Me)	Ryan Trecartin	Experimental Video	7:15	
3/60: Baume Im Herbst	Kurt Kren	Short 16mm	5:00	
According to...	Kevin Jerome Everson	Experimental 16mm On Video	8:45	
And We All Shine On	Michael Robinson	Short 16mm	7:00	
ANTM Cycle 7.5 - Episode 2: The Girl Who Gets Cut	MAXAM	Animation Video	6:04	
Ask the Insects	Steve Reinke	Animation Video	8:00	
Bacchanale	John Amero, Lem Amero	Feature 35mm On Video	70:00	
Battles of Troy	Krassimir Terziev	Documentary Video	51:00	
Battleship Potemkin Dance Edit (120 BPM)	Michael Bell-Smith	Experimental Video	12:30	
Beehive	Ewa Einhorn	Animation Video		
Between Me and Earth	Christopher Miner	Experimental Video	18:00	
Blood of the Earthworm	Brittany Gravely	Experimental 16mm	32:00	
Blow: A Public Service Announcement	Dick Thompson	Animation Video	1:16	
Blue Light	Sandra Gibson	Short 35mm	9:00	
Capital	Ruth Maclennan	Experimental Video	16:00	
Celluloid #1	Steve Staso	Feature 16mm On Video	78:00	New York Premiere
Cervesa Atlas	Janicza Bravo	Experimental Video	0:25	
Chin Music	Mark Hood	Documentary 16mm On Video	13:18	
Colon Karaoke	Brina Thurston	Documentary Video	6:00	
Desert Pumps	Cathee Wilkins, Steve Hall	Short Video	4:00	
Do It	Michael Smith	Experimental Video	3:03	
Each Time I Kill	Doris Wishman	Feature Video	83:00	International Premiere
East 3	Mr. Young	Documentary Video	80:00	New York Premiere
Evergreen	Robert Todd	Experimental 16mm	15:00	
Eviction	Steve Loff	Documentary Video	5:00	
Eyeshot	Diana Heise	Documentary Video	19:54	
Fading Star	John Standiford	Animation 16mm	18:00	
Famous Quotes from Art History	Michael Smith	Experimental Video	1:24	
First Firing	Kelly Oliver, Keary Rosen	Experimental Video	2:38	
For a Blonde... For a Brunette... For Someone... For Her... For You...	Mike Olenick	Experimental Video	5:57	
Frank & Cindy	GJ Echternkamp	Documentary Video	73:00	New York Premiere
Go For It	Michael Smith	Experimental Video	4:49	
Heap	Ewa Einhorn	Animation Video	0:45	
HUSKY	Jenny Drumgoole	Experimental Video	18:00	
i am dancin where you can see me	Iain Bonner	Experimental Video	4:12	
I Like This Sound	Mark Ther	Experimental Video	5:56	
I'm Keith Hernandez	Rob Perri	Documentary Video	19:00	
I'm Serious, She is a Bitch	Rebecca Conroy	Short Video	5:00	
Interplay	Robert Todd	Experimental 16mm	6:30	International Premiere
Intervals and Transformations	Huckleberry Lain	Animation Video	3:30	
Jerry Ruis, Shall We Do This	Josh Safdie, Ariel Schulman	Short 16mm On Video		
July Fix	Jason Livingston	Experimental 16mm	2:00	
K	Ewa Einhorn	Animation Video		
Katunayake Free Trade Zone	Jesper Nordahl	Experimental Video	15:00	
La Trinchera Luminosa del Presidente Gonzalo	Jim Finn	Feature Video	60:00	World Premiere
Lake Affect	Jason Livingston	Experimental Video	1:46	
Life and Times of Robert Kennedy Starring Gary Cooper	Aaron Valdez	Experimental Video	8:00	
Light Work 1	Jennifer Reeves	Experimental Video	8:00	
Losing Ground	Patty Chang	Short Video	6:00	
Lost	Jeanne Finley, John Muse	Experimental Video	3:48	
Lunchfilm	James Fotopoulos, Kevin Jerome Everson, Jem Cohen, Ben Coonley, Mike Plante, Cam Archer, Roger Beebe, James Benning, James Clauer, Bill Daniel, Sharon Lockhart, Eileen Maxson, Carson Mell, Nina Menkes, Chris Peters, Elizabeth Skadden, Sebastian Wolf, Zellner Brothers	Short Video		New York Premiere
Mike	Michael Smith	Animation Video	3:44	
Mike Builds a Shelter	Michael Smith	Experimental Video	24:05	
Nature Mature	James N. Kienitz Wilkins	Experimental 16mm On Video	17:00	
Nice Bombs	Usama Alshaibi	Documentary Video	77:00	New York Premiere
North of the Rug Fibers	Christopher Miner	Experimental Video	2:00	
Notes	Jenny Perlin	Animation 16mm On Video	3:24	
Nubile Nuisance	Carlos Lamontoni	Feature Video	53:13	
NYC Weights & Measures	Jem Cohen	Experimental 16mm On Video	6:15	
Oh Boy!	Jessica Jagtiani	Experimental Video		
Only Just Begun	Jennet Thomas	Experimental Video	8:05	
Origin	Hiromi Yoshida	Experimental 16mm On Video	2:20	
Outstanding Young Men of America	Michael Smith	Experimental Video	9:20	
Paterson - Lodz	Redmond Entwistle	Experimental 16mm		New York Premiere
Paul and the Badger + Ben	Paul Tarragó, Ben Coonley	Experimental Video		International Premiere
Qualities of Stone	Robert Todd	Experimental 16mm	11:00	
Quinquag	Michael Smith	Experimental Video	7:58	
Random Lunacy: Videos from the Road Less Traveled	Victor Zimet, Stephanie Silber	Documentary Video	59:55	New York Premiere
Red without Blue	Brooke Sebold, Benita Naschold Sills, Todd Sills	Documentary Video	74:06	New York Premiere
Regarding the Pain of Susan Sontag (notes on Camp)	Steve Reinke	Animation Video	4:00	
Review	Jenny Perlin	Animation 16mm On Video	3:00	
Sand Quarry	Raphael Grisey	Experimental Video	6:00	
Schweigen	Ewa Einhorn, Misha Stroj	Animation Video	0:37	
Secret Horror	Michael Smith	Experimental Video	13:24	
Shhh... They're Getting Closer	Todd Verow	Experimental Video	5:00	
Slow Jamz	Karthik Pandian	Experimental Video	7:24	
Something Else	Kevin Jerome Everson	Experimental 16mm On Video	2:00	
Sway	Richard Sandler	Documentary Video	33:00	
TERROR!	Ben Rivers	Documentary 35mm On Video	24:00	World Premiere
The Boy in the Air	Lyn Elliot	Experimental Video	2:00	
The General Returns from One Place to Another	Michael Robinson	Experimental 16mm On Video	11:00	
The Great Happiness Space: Tale of an Osaka Love Thief	Jake Clennell	Documentary Video	75:44	
The Insignificant Other	Nail Chiodo	Feature 16mm On Video	88:55	International Premiere
The Mendi	Steve Reinke	Animation 16mm On Video	9:00	
The MUSCO Story	Michael Smith	Experimental Video	5:48	
The Night Before Christmas	Sam Bassett	Short Video	8:00	
The Pig Bromise	Ewa Einhorn, Misha Stroj	Animation Video	1:00	
The Professor	Jason Price	Documentary Video	25:00	
The Results of Energy Neither Being Created Nor Destroyed on a Sunny Day	James Yamada	Experimental Video	4:00	
The Sky Song	James Fotopoulos	Feature Video	79:52	World Premiere
The Truth and the Pleasure	Jennet Thomas	Experimental Video	4:30	
Through These Trackless Waters	Elizabeth Henry	Experimental 16mm On Video	12:30	
Towards	Ewa Einhorn	Animation Video	1:00	
Tube Time!	Short Video			
Ultimate Reality	Jimmy Joe Roche	Experimental Video	18:00	
Underscan	Nancy Holt	Short Video	21:00	
Untitled Film, No. 9	David Butler	Experimental Video	5:23	
Untitled Video on Lynne Stewart and Her Conviction, the Law, and Poetry	Paul Chan	Documentary Video	17:30	
Valley of the Castles (Hunting Eagles)	Ruth Maclennan	Experimental Video	19:50	
Viva	Anna Biller	Feature 35mm	120:00	New York Premiere
Welcome to Normal	Marianna Ellenberg	Animation Video	7:00	
Wing Bowl 13	Jenny Drumgoole	Documentary Video		
You Don't Understand He is a Painter by Nature	James Fotopoulos	Experimental Video	0:40	
You're Not Supposed to be Here	James Fotopoulos	Experimental Video	0:52	

== See also ==
- New York Underground Film Festival site
- 2007 Festival Archive
