= Ed Wood bibliography =

This is a list of the books by Edward D. Wood, Jr.

- Black Lace Drag (1963). Also known as Killer in Drag (from 1965)--as well as Blacklace Drag, The Twilight Land, Homosexual Generation, and translated as La Drag Asesina. The novel concerns a hitman named Glen Marker who kills while in drag as his alter ego Glenda Satin.
- Orgy of the Dead (1966). This novel was released after the movie of the same title but was actually written prior to it. It also features sequences from other Wood movies including The Night the Banshee Cried.
- Parisian Passions (1966). This story involves a transvestite cop investigating the strangling of a number of Paris strippers. The pseudonym on the cover reads "J. X. Williams" although in a printing error, Wood’s name appears on the inside title page.
- Watts...The Difference (1966). AKA Burn, Baby, Burn. A series of flashbacks as a Hollywood cowboy actor and his lover reminisce.
- Sideshow Siren (1966). AKA Naked Bones. A carnival freak escapes a sideshow and a series of gruesome murders ensue.
- Drag Trade (1967). A story about a psychologically damaged male character who was made to wear pink dresses as a child. Ed Wood appears in drag on the cover of this book.
- Bloodiest Sex Crimes of History (1967). His first non-fiction book is written under the pseudonym of "Spenser and West" and details real-life stories of vampirism and cannibalism.
- Security Risk (1967).
- Watts...After (1967). Sequel to Watts...The Difference.
- Devil Girls (1967).
- It Takes One to Know One (1967).
- Death of a Transvestite (1967). Also known as Let Me Die in Drag and Hollywood Drag. This is the sequel novel to 1963’s Black Lace Drag and sees Glen Marker on death row. He requests to die in drag. The story is mostly told through documents such as police reports. As with Drag Trade, Ed Wood features in drag on the cover of some versions of this novel although his anonymity is maintained by a black bar positioned across his eyes. It is sometimes published under the pseudonym of "Woodrow Edwards".
- Suburbia Confidential (1967).
- Nighttime Lez (1968). Tales of sexual experimentation.
- Raped in the Grass (1968). This brutal pornographic novel depicts two young American girls being tortured and raped by rogue Native Americans. It is accompanied by black and white photographs, allegedly taken from a movie of the same title.
- Bye Bye Broadie (1968). Also contains photographs purportedly from a film.
- The Perverts (1968). Published under the name "Jason Nichols".
- The Gay Underworld (1968).
- Sex, Shrouds and Caskets (1968).
- The Sexecutives (1968).
- Sex Museum (1968).
- The Love of the Dead (1968).
- One, Two, Three (1968).
- Hell Chicks (1968).
- Purple Thighs (1968). AKA Lost Souls Delivered. A story about the sexual freedom of hippies.
- Carnival Piece (1969).
- Toni: Black Tigress (1969).
- Mama’s Diary (1969).
- Hollywood Rat Race (1960s). Throughout the sixties, Wood worked on a quasi-memoir detailing the zeitgeist of Hollywood in the sixties. The book also has elements of advice for those trying to establish themselves in show business. Never published at the time, it was first published in the 1990s.
- To Make a Homo (1971).
- Black Myth (1971).
- A Study of the Sons and Daughters of Erotica (1971). A treatise on deviant sexuality, including a quote or two from Criswell. Plugs Glen or Glenda and the then forthcoming A Study of Sexual Practices in Witchcraft and Black Magic, Book Two (1971).
- A Study of Sexual Practices in Witchcraft and Black Magic, Book Two (1971).
- The Sexual Woman: Book 2 (1971).
- The Sexual Man: Book 2 (1971).
- Mary-Go-Round (1972).
- The Only House (1972). This is the novel version of Ed Wood’s movie, ‘Necromania’.
- A Study of Fetishes and Fantasies (1973).
- A Study in the Motivation of Censorship, Sex and the Movies, Book 1 (1973).
- A Study in the Motivation of Censorship, Sex and the Movies, Book 2 (1973).
- Tales for a Sexy Night, Vol. 1 (1973).
- Tales for a Sexy Night, Vol. 2 (1973).
- Outlaws of the Old West (1973). Wood has one non-fiction short in this compilation: "Pearl Hart and the Last Stage."
- Diary of a Transvestite Hooker, The (1973).
- Forced Entry (1974).
- Sex Salvation (1975) aka Saving Grace: The Last Lash
- TV Lust (1977).

Possible works:

- And He Rode All Night
- Black Sexual Habits and Techniques
- The Erotic Spy
- For Love or Money
- Gay Black
- The Greek Connection
- Hollywood Sex Book
- Lesbian Wife Swapping
- Male Wives
- Offbeat Orgies
- The Oralists
- Pleasure Dorm
- The Producer
- Riot, Rape & Revelry
- Sex Life of the Alcoholic
- The Skin Flick
- Strange Sisters
- A Study of Stag Films
- The Svengali of Sex
- Swedish House
- They
- The Trouble With ---?
- Young, Black and Gay
