= Reckless Eyeballing =

Reckless Eyeballing may refer to:

- Reckless Eyeballing, a 1986 novel by Ishmael Reed
- Reckless Eyeballing, a film by Christopher Harris shown at the 2005 New York Underground Film Festival
- Reckless Eyeballing, a 1995 art installation by Keith Piper
