= Cohene =

Cohene is a surname. Notable people with the surname include:

- Aleesa Cohene (born 1976), Canadian film director
- Javier Cohene (born 1987), Paraguayan-Palestinian footballer
