= Camerado =

Film Production Group

Camerado is a commercial film, video and multimedia production group that produces independent, multicultural-themed films, videos, and media events with a prosocial agenda.

Camerado has been operating in Southeast Asia since 2005, and is one of the first few motion picture production companies to be functioning in Cambodia since the departure of the Khmer Rouge regime.

== Background ==
Camerado, which is named for poem Song of the Open Road in Walt Whitman’s Leaves of Grass, was originally established in New York City in 2000 to support the production and launch of the award winning social issue documentary, Bookwars. BookWars premiered at the 2000 New York Underground Film Festival 2000 New York Underground Film Festival, where it won the Best Documentary Award.

Camerado subsequently relocated to New Mexico in 2003 to commence production of the multicultural feature drama, Lost in New Mexico: the strange tale of Susan Hero (2008). The ultra-low budget effort was financed primarily with a World Trade Center disaster grant, following the loss of the original Camerado offices in New York to toxic dust and debris.

The film featured Native American actors and non-actors, and addressed a wide variety of social issue themes, including illegal immigration and human cloning. Lost in New Mexico premiered at the Riverside International Film Festival, and went on to screen at the Route 66 Film Festival, the International Panorama of Independent Film, the Santa Fe Film Festival, and other venues and festivals. The movie is currently represented by Goliath Arts for TV sales in North America and Europe.

In 2004, on the eve of the second US incursion into Iraq, Camerado suspended operations in the United States and relocated to Southeast Asia to undertake prosocial media efforts there.

== Camerado in Southeast Asia ==
In 2005, Camerado was commissioned by the NGO Forum on Cambodia to produce an investigative documentary, Crisis (2005), about landgrabbing in indigenous areas of the Cambodian province of Ratanakiri. The film features Khmer, Jarai, and Tampuen indigenous languages, with a Cambodian voiceover.

Camerado later produced the commissioned documentary, Have Forest, Have Life, (2006) a joint effort of the conservation groups Wildaid, Conservation International, and Fauna and Flora International. Have Forest, Have Life was intended to raise awareness about biodiversity issues in the remote Cardamom forest region of Cambodia. Production of the documentary was unorthodox for a donor-financed documentary, as it utilized fictionalized characters, re-enactments, and dramatic-style narration to engage rural audiences as effectively as possible.

In 2008, Camerado produced Cambodia’s first rockumentary, Vuth Learns to Rock the story of a young Cambodian who hears Western rock music for the first time and learns about the Doors, the Ramones, the Kinks, and other rock luminaries. Produced by Vuth Tep, a Cambodian motorcycle taxi driver who learned to shoot and produce video with Camerado, Vuth Learns to Rock premiered at the 2009 Florida Film Festival and continues to screen at venues around the world.

Unlike the traditionally hierarchical structure of many studios and production groups, Camerado is decentralized and "wiki-like", with talent being incorporated into projects in a participatory basis. With Camerado’s Cambodia-based efforts, local Khmer staff were trained from scratch, due to the generation of skilled media practitioners who were mostly killed off during the Khmer Rouge regime.

== Current activities ==
Camerado is the founder and producer of Cambodia's only international, independent film festival, CamboFest, which was established in 2007 in part to help revive the flagging Cambodian film industry after its destruction during the Khmer Rouge regime. Screenings to date have taken place in Phnom Penh, Siem Reap (home of Angkor Wat), and in rural areas and provincial towns in Cambodia. CamboFest is recognized by the Asia Pacific Screen Awards and others as the sole film submitting organization representing Cambodia for their pan-Asian event.

Camerado founded Cambodia’s first online video sharing portal, CamboTube as a grass-roots effort in 2007 in order to provide a liberalized media outlet for a new generation of Cambodian Internet users, while contributing to Internet and media literacy. The portal was hailed by the Cambodia Daily as “an important tool for democracy”, though it was greeted with wariness by the Cambodian government - who nonetheless did not interfere with its operations.

CamboTube was eventually hampered by digital divide issues which still faces the bulk of the Cambodian population, and is currently being folded into a broader, regional, online channel.

Meetings between Camerado principal Jason Rosette and relevant Cambodian Ministry officials in 2008 led to the production of a copyright guide for usage of pre-Khmer Rouge music, film, and other content, as the intervening Khmer Rouge regime had abolished all ownership and thereby "orphaned" many affected works.

The Camerado-produced Bangkok IndieFest, is an independent film festival in Bangkok, Thailand, which features the world’s first dedicated Edutainment movie competition, alongside purely entertaining films and videos. The festival was conceived to showcase Thai and International independent films and edutainment media in a single, multicultural environment.
