= JX =

JX may refer to:

== People ==
- JX, an early alias of DJ Jake Williams
- J. X. Williams, a pseudonym used by several different authors during the 1960s for many adult novels

== Technology ==
- Roland JX-3P, a MIDI capable synthesizer keyboard which debuted in 1983
- JX (operating system), a Java operating system
- IBM JX, a personal computer that based on IBM PCjr, released in Japan, in 1984
- Infiniti JX, a midsize, three-row family crossover produced by Infiniti which was later renamed Infiniti QX60.

== Other uses ==
- Jx or jx, a digraph in the Esperanto x-system orthography
- Starlux Airlines, a Taiwanese airline (IATA code JX since 2020)
- Jiangxi, a province of China (Guobiao abbreviation JX)
