= Interkosmos (film) =

- Directed by: Jim Finn
- Written by: Jim Finn
- Starring: Dean DeMatteis; Jim Finn; Nandini Khaund; Goran Milos; Ruediger van den Boom
- Cinematography: Dean DeMatteis; Butcher Walsh
- Edited by: Jim Finn
- Music by: Jim Becker; Colleen Burke
- Distributed by: Facets Multimedia
- Release date: 2006
- Running time: 71 min.
- Country: United States
- Language: German/English
- Budget: $12,500

Interkosmos is a 2006 film directed by Jim Finn.

== Plot summary ==
This film is a false documentary about a fictional, top-secret Soviet Interkosmos space mission based in East Germany. Two ships are sent out to set up both an industrial colony on Saturn's moon Titan and a recreational colony on Jupiter's moon Ganymede. The film covers the background of the mission, as well as several radio conversations between the leaders of the two separate colonizing missions, the female Seagull and the male Falcon, who are implied to be in a romantic relationship. Besides colonizing the two moons, part of the mission is also to set up an archive of Socialist culture within the vacuum of space. For reasons not explained within the film, the mission fails, and all records of it are either destroyed or hidden away. However, the last scene reveals Seagull and Falcon to be still alive, as they converse about other failed secret Soviet space missions, most of which resulted in the demise of the entire crew.

== Reception ==
The Village Voice's Dennis Lim called Interkosmos a "a retro gust of Communist utopianism" stating that it "weaves together lovingly faked archival footage, charmingly undermotivated musical numbers, propagandistic maxims ("Capitalism is like a kindergarten of boneless children"), stop-motion animation (of a suitably crude GDR-era level), a Teutonic (and vaguely Herzogian) voiceover, and a superb garage-y Kraut-rock score (by Jim Becker and Colleen Burke). Finn's deadpan is immaculately bone-dry, and his antiquarian fastidiousness is worthy of Guy Maddin." Wired's Jason Silverman ranked Interkosmos alongside Automatons, Puzzlehead, and The Wild Blue Yonder as "Best Shoestring Sci-Fi of 2006" stating that "At times, Interkosmos' hip, deadpan style threatens to grow tiresome, but then Finn injects something unexpected to liven it up. By the end, Interkosmos has coalesced into a colorful portrait of an imagined time where movies and space travel were happy, bubbly things."
