= 2000 New York Underground Film Festival =

These are the films shown at the 7th New York Underground Film Festival, held from March 8–14, 2000.

| Film Name | Director | Type | Length | Notes |
|---|---|---|---|---|
| - - - | Theo Angell | Experimental Video | 6:41 | |
| 4 Ways he tried to tell you | Jennet Thomas | Experimental Video | 6:00 | |
| A Primer for Dental Extraction | Carl Wiedemann | Experimental 16mm on video | 4:30 | |
| A Sudden Loss of Gravity | Todd Verow | Feature Video | 85:00 | US Premiere |
| Aerobicide | Kathleen Hanna & Sadie Benning | Experimental Video | 4:00 | |
| American Gypsy: A Stranger in Everybody's Land | Jasmine Dellal | Documentary Video | 79:00 | |
| Amerikan Passport | Reed Paget | Documentary 16mm | 83:00 | New York Premiere |
| An Accident in Paradise | Micha Klein | | 9:00 | |
| Atari Teenage Riot | Philipp Virus | | | |
| Attack | Philipp Virus | | | |
| Bathing the Baby | Semefo | Experimental Video | 10:00 | |
| Beat Time | Joost Rekveld | | 9:00 | |
| Black & Gold: The Latin King and Queen Nation | Richard Rowley & Jacqui Soohen | Documentary Video | 76:00 | New York Premiere |
| Blow Me | Marcel DeJure | Short 16mm | 10:00 | |
| BookWars | Jason Rosette | Documentary Video | 79:00 | World Premiere |
| Bored to Pieces | Jamie Ruddy | Short 16mm | 5:30 | |
| Born to Lose (The Last Rock and Roll Movie) | Lech Kowalski | Documentary Video | 90:00 | International Premiere |
| Chromasonic | Frank Scheffer | | 13:00 | |
| Chuck | Alex Turner | Short 16mm | 16:23 | |
| Civilisation Virus | Philipp Virus | | | |
| Cocaine Ducks | Philipp Virus | | | |
| Coleslaw Wrestling | Hayley Downs | Documentary Video | 3:00 | |
| Comm Raid on the Potemkin | Enda Hughes | Short 35mm | 3:00 | |
| Cook | Philipp Virus | | | |
| Dance Habibi Dance | Usama Alshaibi | Experimental 16mm on video | 4:00 | |
| Deep Africa | Steve Hall & Cathee Wilkins | Animation Video | 30:00 | |
| Deep Creep | Kate Haug | Experimental 16mm | 7:14 | |
| Destroy 2000 Years of Culture | Philipp Virus | | | |
| Dickhead | Brian Tane | Experimental Video | 3:00 | |
| Do Not Ruin Your Credit | Paul Kell & Faisal Lutchmedial | Experimental Video | 6:30 | |
| Dreams of a Dead Poet (the remix) | Rob Schroder | | 9:00 | |
| Duty Nickels | Richard Morbid | Short 16mm | 10:00 | |
| Ecstasy in Entropy | Nick Zedd | Experimental 16mm | 15:00 | |
| Embryonic | Robert Banks, Jr. | Experimental 35mm | 5:00 | |
| Eyes to Heaven | Shane Hawks | Feature 16mm on video | 88:00 | World Premiere |
| Feminist Fatales | Gritt Uldall-Jessen | Experimental Video | 3:30 | |
| FILM(knout) | Deco Dawson | Experimental 16mm | 9:43 | |
| Fissures | Louise Bourque | Experimental 16mm | 2:30 | |
| Fluff | William E. Jones | Experimental Video | 3:00 | |
| Frozen Hot | Charles Brousseau/Fisher | Feature 35mm on video | 90:00 | New York Premiere |
| Fruit of the Vine | Coan Nichols & Rick Charnoski | Documentary Super-8 on video | 45:00 | World Premiere |
| Frustration | Tom Patterson | Experimental Video | 3:43 | |
| GodAss | Esther Bell | Feature Video | 73:00 | World Premiere |
| Grand Central | Jeff Scher | Experimental 16mm | 15:00 | |
| Hello Kitty | Noel Dowd | Short Video | 14:00 | |
| Hi I'm Steve | Robert Kennedy | Short 16mm | 6:00 | |
| High Rocks | Jason Blalock | Documentary Video | 19:00 | |
| I Saw Bones | Miranda July | | | |
| Interior. Bedroom - Night | Charles Olivier | Short 16mm | 10:00 | |
| Jeff | Mark Hejnar | Experimental Video | 4:00 | |
| Jesse Helms is Cleaning Up America | Bob Judd | Experimental Video | 6:34 | |
| Kids Are United | Philipp Virus | | | |
| Kingdom of Poet O | Dennis Karsten | Documentary 16mm on video | 9:20 | |
| Language Sign Duality is Asymmetrical | Andrej Velikanova & Julia Velikanova | Experimental Video | 11:00 | |
| Lee Hazlewood in New York | Suki Hawley & Michael Galinsky | Documentary Video | 8:00 | |
| Liquid Sky | Slava Tsukerman | Feature 35mm | 114:00 | |
| Live and Let Ride | Tara Cooper | Documentary Video | 15:00 | |
| Look Back, Don't Look Back | Randy Bell & Justin Rice | Documentary 16mm | 30:00 | |
| Low On Ice | Philipp Virus | | | |
| Lucy's Dream | Relah Eckstein | Experimental 16mm | 12:30 | |
| Lullaby | Jennifer Reeder | Experimental Video | 18:00 | |
| Magic City | David Wilson | Documentary 16mm on video | 18:36 | |
| Meat Fucker | Shawn Durr | Short Video | 28:00 | |
| Median Strip | James Schneider | Documentary 16mm | 8:00 | |
| Migrating Forms | James Fotopoulos | Feature 16mm | 80:00 | World Premiere |
| Monk Fish Dream | Naoko Nozawa | Short Video | 31:00 | |
| Monkey vs. Robot!! | Nathan Pommer | Short Super-8/16mm/35mm on video | 2:30 | |
| Morphology of Desire | Robert Arnold | Experimental 16mm | 5:45 | |
| Muckafurgason: Dreaming on a Cloud | Vernon Chatman | Documentary Video | 11:00 | |
| Music for Airports | Frank Scheffer | | | |
| N.Y.H.C. | Frank Pavich | Documentary Video | 87:00 | East Coast Premiere |
| Nest of Tens | Miranda July | Experimental Video | 26:27 | |
| Nest of Tens | Miranda July | | | US Premiere |
| Nitwit Predelick | Xan Price | Short Video | 8:12 | |
| No Place Like Home #1 and #2 | Karen Yasinsky | Animation 16mm on video | 11:00 | |
| Nostalgia for the Future | Ian Kerkhof | | 22:00 | |
| Obsessed with Jews | Jeff Krulik | Documentary Video | 10:00 | |
| Once & Future Queen | Todd Verow | Feature Video | 90:00 | World Premiere |
| Performance | Laura Parnes | Experimental Video | 4:00 | |
| Pigskin Orgasm | Jennifer Cluck & Amber Cluck | Experimental Video | 3:00 | |
| Please Kill Mr. Kinski | David Schmoeller | Documentary Video | 9:00 | |
| pornfilm | Stephanie Barber | Experimental 16mm | 7:00 | |
| Porno Invaders Game | Shojo No Tomo | Animation Video | 3:00 | |
| Preserve Your Estate | Animal Charm | (Live) Experimental Video | 9:30 | |
| Princess 2000: Where Did All the Love Go? | Theresa Dillon | Experimental Video | 4:00 | |
| Quiver | Scott Beveridge | Short 16mm | 5:00 | |
| Recitalc | Seth Price | Experimental 16mm on video | 15:44 | |
| Removed | Naomi Uman | Experimental 16mm | 7:00 | |
| Revolution Action: Live at QEH2 London | Philipp Virus | | | |
| Rock Opera | Bob Ray | Feature 16mm on video | 90:00 | East Coast Premiere |
| Sex on the Fritz: Performance Anxiety | Astria Suparak | | | |
| Shadow Boxers | Katya Bankowsky | Documentary 35mm | 72:00 | |
| Sick To Death | Philipp Virus | | | |
| Sign of the Times | Miriam Kruishoop | | 10:00 | |
| sincerely, joe p. bear | Matt McCormick | Experimental 16mm | 4:00 | |
| Skate or Die Harder! | Helen Stickler | | | |
| Skatopia | Rick Charnoski | Documentary Video | 12:00 | |
| Some Like It Without Sugar | Andrej Velikanova & Julia Velikanova | Experimental Video | 11:00 | |
| Songs for Cassavetes | Justin Mitchell | Documentary 16mm | 87:00 | World Premiere |
| Sonic Fragments: The Poetics of Digital Fragmentation | Ian Kerkhof, Frank Scheffer, Micha Klein, Alexander Oey, Miriam Kruishoop, Rob Schroder, Joost Rekveld | Experimental | 78:00 | International Premiere |
| Special Report | Bryan Boyce | Experimental Video | 4:00 | |
| Spectres of the Spectrum | Craig Baldwin | Feature 16mm | 88:00 | |
| Speed | Philipp Virus | | | |
| Spiders in Love: An Arachnogasmic Musical | Martha Colburn | Animation 16mm | 3:00 | |
| Squat | Savin Yeatman-Eiffel | Animation Video | 7:20 | |
| Standard Industry | Robert Stoetzel | Experimental 35mm | 6:00 | |
| Sunday 10:42 am | Jonathan Green | Experimental Video | 3:00 | |
| Surface 2043 | Meg Hanna | Short Super-8 on video | 28:00 | |
| Surprise Cinema | Bill Plympton | Animation 35mm | 7:00 | |
| Sweat | Philipp Virus | | | |
| Swingers' Serenade | Danny Plotnick | Short 16mm | 23:40 | |
| Talent Show | Laura Parnes | Experimental Video | 4:00 | |
| Target | Animal Charm | Experimental Video | 8:30 | |
| Taxidermy: The Art of Imitating Life | Eva S. Aridjis | Documentary 16mm | 8:00 | |
| Terminator III | Andrej Velikanova & Julia Velikanova | Experimental Video | 11:00 | |
| The Birth of Century Sam | Jesse Brown | Animation Video | 1:52 | |
| The BLVD | Deborah Stratman | Documentary Video | 64:00 | East Coast Premiere |
| The Brady Lunch | Brendan Conway | Documentary Video | 8:00 | |
| The Businessman | Ethan Minsker | Short Video | 16:00 | |
| The Death of Sex | Carey Burtt | Experimental 16mm | 4:00 | |
| The Drowning Room | Reynold Reynolds & Patrick Jolley | Experimental 35mm | 10:00 | |
| The End of the Ego | Alexander Oey | | 10:00 | |
| The Flocculus | Jeff Warrington | Animation Video | 8:00 | |
| The Littlest Circus | Alex Cohn | Short Video | 8:12 | |
| The Love Machine | Gordon Eriksen | Feature 16mm | 82:00 | New York Premiere |
| The Magnificent Andersons | Julie Morrison | Documentary Video | 31:00 | |
| The Manipulators | Andrew Jeffrey Wright & Claire E. Rojas | Animation 16mm | 2:35 | |
| The Penny Marshall Project | Greg Pak | Short Video | 12:30 | |
| The Quest | Francois Miron | Experimental 16mm | 10:00 | |
| The Report Soundtrack | Philipp Virus | | | |
| The Shield Around the K: The Story of K Records | Heather Rose Dominic | Documentary Video | 85:00 | World Premiere |
| The Target Shoots First | Christopher Wilcha | Documentary Video | 60:00 | |
| The Vyrontonin Decision | Matt McCormick | Experimental 16mm | 7:00 | |
| The Warhaul | Tim Vierling | Animation 16mm | 7:00 | |
| Thorn and Toad | Tobin Yelland | Documentary Super-8 on video | 3:15 | |
| Tie Me To The Wall | Philipp Virus | | | |
| Tiger Me Bollix | Andrew Lampert & Moira Tierney | Experimental Super-8 | 3:30 | |
| Tim & Andy Fight and then Go Bowling | John Tagamolila | Short 16mm | 7:00 | |
| Two Cats | James Fotopoulos | Experimental 16mm | 0:47 | |
| Untitled #29.95 | The Video Aktivists | Experimental Video | 15:00 | |
| We All Die | Philipp Virus | | | |
| We Punkeinheit | Philipp Virus | | | |
| Who Needs Hollywood! The Story of Video Pioneer John Door and EZTV | Nina Rota | Documentary Video | 26:30 | |
| Wrist | Matthew Harrison | Experimental 16mm | 5:00 | |
| WSNO | Miranda July | Audio composition CD recording | 9:12 | |
| You Ain't Nothing | Philipp Virus | | | |
| You're A Hero | Philipp Virus | | | |

== See also ==
- New York Underground Film Festival site
- 2000 Festival Archive
