= MPG: Motion Picture Genocide =

- Directed by: Robert Banks
- Release date: 1997

MPG: Motion Picture Genocide is a 1997 film by Robert Banks.

== Summary ==
It is an examination of 100 years of African Americans being murdered in films for cheap thrills and escapism.

== See also ==
- Last House on the Left - the 1972 horror film with the tagline featured on Robert Banks's film "to avoid fainting, keep repeating: it's only a movie"
- Media violence
