= Bill Brown (filmmaker) =

American filmmaker (21st century)

- Born: William Brown; Lubbock, Texas, U.S.
- Education: California Institute of the Arts (MFA); Harvard University (BFA)
- Known for: Documentary and essay film, Photography
- Awards: New York Underground Film Festival Award (2002); USA Film Festival Texas Award (2000)
- Website: www.heybillbrown.com

Bill Brown is a "nomadic" filmmaker, photographer, and author from Lubbock, Texas.

== Style, output and other projects ==
Brown has produced films on the United States–Mexico border, North Dakota missile silos, the Trans-Canada Highway, among other places. The films have been exhibited at numerous film festivals and museums, including the Museum of Modern Art in New York. He describes his films as postcards with a pretty picture but instead of words on the back, his films are narrated with voiceover.

Brown is also the author of a zine called Dream Whip which currently has 15 issues, and the book Saugus to the Sea (ISBN 978-0968974407). In 2001 Brown received the Creative Capital Award in the Discipline of Moving Image.

== Films ==
- Roswell (1994)
- Hub City (1996)
- Confederation Park (1999)
- Buffalo Common (2001)
- Mountain State (2003)
- The Other Side (2006)
- Chicago Corner (2009)
- Document (2012)
- Memorial Land (2012)
- Speculation Nation (2014) co-directed by Sabine Gruffat
- Amarillo Ramp (2017) co-directed by Sabine Gruffat
- XCTRY (2018)
- Life on the Mississippi (2018)
