= Rachel Mayeri =

Racheli Mayeri (born 1969 in Berkeley, California) is an American contemporary artist.

== Life ==
Mayeri was born in 1969 in Berkeley, California. Mayeri received a Master of Fine Arts degree from the University of California, San Diego. She lives in Los Angeles where she is a full professor of Media Studies at Harvey Mudd College.

== Work ==
Mayeri is known for her artworks involving chimpanzees. Her 2011 work Primate Cinema: Apes as Family, billed as "the first film made for chimps", was made in collaboration with the Edinburgh Zoo. The piece was selected for screening at the Berlinale film festival and the 2013 Sundance film festival.

== Awards ==
Mayeri received an honourable mention at the 2011 Prix Ars Electronica.
