= Wyld File =

Wyld File is a commercial music video production company formed in 2005 by the Paper Rad collective and Eric Mast (E*Rock). The company has produced music videos for the band The Gossip ("Standing in the Way of Control"), Beck ("Gameboy Homeboy") and Islands ("Don’t Call Me Whitney, Bobby"). The Paper Rad Collective has also produced numerous music videos for other bands, including Lightning Bolt, Wolf Eyes and the 1960s psychedelic rock band Bubble Puppy, and E*Rock has produced animated music videos for the bands Ratatat, Yellow Swans, Global Goon, and Nice Nice.
