= Jenny Drumgoole =

American multimedia artist

- Known for: Multimedia

Jenny Drumgoole is a multimedia artist, based in Philadelphia, Pennsylvania, who works in both video and performance, as well as photography. Many of her videos include her taking part in competitions such as "The Real Women of Philadelphia" or The Wing Bowl, as well as performing as one of her personas, Soxx Roxx, and many other heightened versions of herself. After spending a lot of time making photographs, she made a switch over to video and performance work. Her first video she made, Wing Bowl 13, started as a photo project where she was photographing competitive eater, Sonya Thomas, at the Wing Bowl in 2005. She found that the sounds that are able to be included into a video, heightened the experience. She also has a video series called "Happy Trash Day!" where she goes around Philadelphia to celebrate the city sanitation workers. In 2017 Drumgoole was the Digital Artist in Residence at the Main Line Art Center in Haverford, Pennsylvania.
