= Multi-touch, physics and gestures =

Method of interacting with electronic devices

In human–computer interaction, MPG stands for "multi-touch, physics and gestures", referencing a common method of interacting with computers and various electronic devices. The most notable MPG device is the Apple Inc iPhone, which makes use of many multi-touch gestures to operate various functions of the phone and applications on the phone.
