= Manual pulse generator =

Computing input device

A manual pulse generator (MPG) is a device that generates discrete pulses, allowing an operator to manually control the movement of a tool or device to a desired position. MPGs are commonly used on computer numerically controlled (CNC) machine tools, microscopes, and other devices requiring precise component positioning. In telerobotics, MPGs are used as a human‑operated interfaces to manually command the motion of equipment, allowing the operator to control positioning tasks directly. A typical MPG consists of a rotatary knob that produces pulses sent to a controller, which interprets each pulse as a command to move the equipment a predetermined increment.

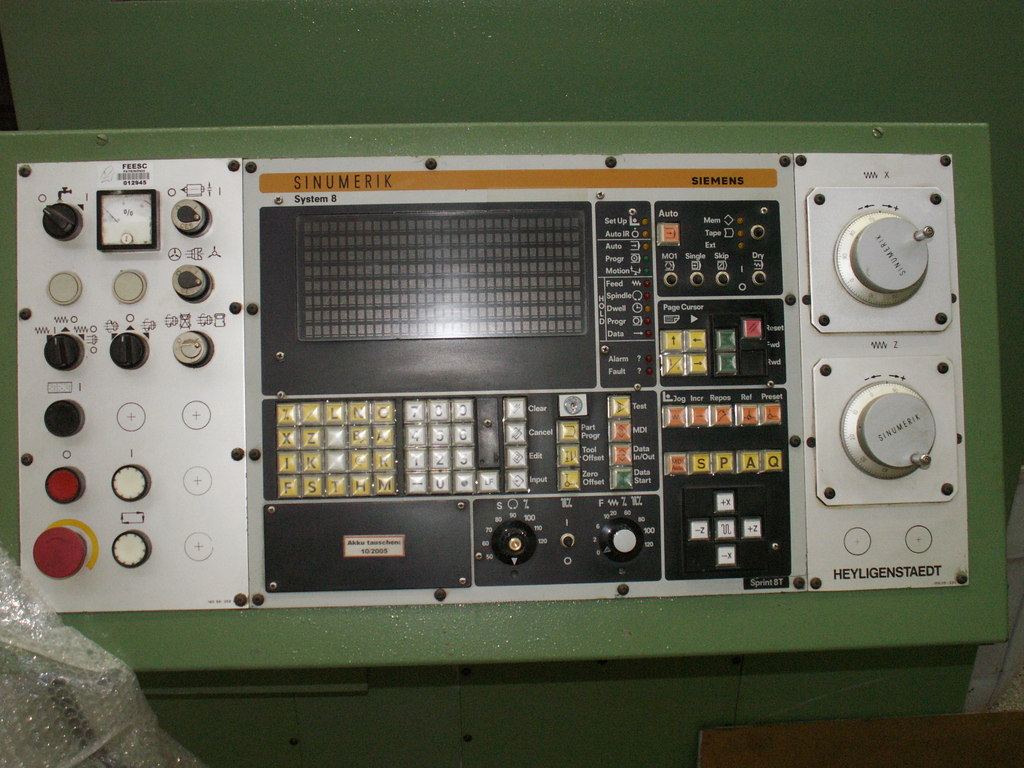
Each of the handwheels on this CNC control actuates a manual pulse generator. One moves the cross-slide (X-axis) and the other moves the Z-axis

For example, the handwheel of a typical CNC control will move any of the slides of the machine by one minimum increment, such as 1 micrometre or 1 ten-thousandth of an inch, for each pulse, and the handwheel will give one ratchet-like click or other haptic click to confirm to the user that a single increment occurred. Several selector switches control the handwheel's output: one allows each of the machine's axes (X, Y, Z, and so on) to be selected in turn; another shifts through several ranges of output, so that one click of the wheel is either one minimum increment, 10 times that, or 100 times that.

The modern trend in CNC user interface design is to place the MPG on a handheld pendant that the operator can carry, making it conveniently independent from the main control panel, just as a game controller is independent from the video game console.
