= Wizard People, Dear Reader =

Unauthorized alternative soundtrack to Harry Potter and the Sorcerer's Stone

Cover art for the audio recording

Wizard People, Dear Reader, released in 2004, is an unauthorized alternative soundtrack to Harry Potter and the Philosopher's Stone, written by Brad Neely, a comic book artist from Fort Smith, Arkansas.

Wizard People, Dear Reader is a narrative retelling of the lives of the characters of The Philosopher's Stone and the world in which they live. Presented in the form of a thirty-five chapter audiobook, this soundtrack is intended to replace the film's audio track.

== Origins ==
Brad Neely, in an interview with Chief magazine, described the beginning of the idea as follows:

Anyway, we were at a bar and were getting a good laugh at a guy who was playing pool all by himself while wearing a hoody over his hat, sunglasses under that and headphones on the outside of all of it. So we started riffing on "What could he possibly be listening to?". Someone who I don't think was me said that he was listening to a book on tape of Harry Potter. And out came the Wizard People narrator. I joked that night that I was going to rush home and record an entire misinformed book on tape of The Sorcerer's Stone, because I had not and have not ever read any Harry Potter books. Once I started making notes for it I realized that an audio track alone could get boring, so I decided to sync it with the movie. Then I took a week or two and made the damn thing. I love it.

== Presentations ==
In 2004, the New York Underground Film Festival rented a print of the film from Warner Bros., screened it with the sound off, and played Neely's soundtrack instead. Shortly thereafter, website Illegal Art made Neely's work available for free download. In the following year, Neely also performed Wizard People live in several cities, until Warner Bros. took action against theatres that had rented prints, and forced them to cancel the shows. Rather than taking legal action, however, Warner Bros. reportedly told theaters which had scheduled a performance of the show that further movies produced by the studio would be withheld unless the dates were cancelled. Carrie McLaren, whose website Illegal-art.net promoted the work, claimed that Neely's use of appropriated plot, characters and themes interlaced with humor constituted a separate work of art in its own right.

== Humor and writing style ==
In Wizard People, Dear Reader, Neely's writing ranges from simple childish mockery, to criticism of the acting and set design, to awkward metaphors, to over-dramatic philosophical speeches. Harry himself is repeatedly referred to as a god, references are made to the "stockpiles of nuclear-level energy" that are his powers, and so on. At one point, Harry calls himself a "beautiful animal" and a "destroyer of worlds". He also repeatedly affirms that he is "Harry fucking Potter". Numerous references are made to characters taking out unseen flasks or drinking alcohol, and Harry is mentioned as being "drunk every day before noon."

Hermione ("Harmony") is repeatedly described as incredibly ugly, Snape ("Snake") is referred to as a hideous woman, and at one point, Neely simply remarks that "Ron loves Twizzlers." (Ron is almost always referred to as "Ronnie the Bear".) A range of other insults see less consistent use, and Harry is also described with various symptoms of dissociative identity disorder, at one point "leaving his multiple personalities in the locker room." The use of spells receives similar twists, with Dumbledore ("Near-Dead Dumbledore") casting the "stand without effort" spell due to his advanced age, while Harry casts the "rarely used winter-begone spell" at a scene transition between winter and spring.

The work makes extensive use of simile: Professor McGonagall ("Hardcastle McCormick") is described as having a voice that is "chilling, like a piano made of frozen Windex," while her "eyes float like smears of fish-scales on her candle-wax stump of a head"; the face of Voldemort ("Val-Mart") "moves like a marmalade baby just out of the womb."

The soundtrack uses heavy descriptions of events, including events the viewer can plainly see: "Blam! Blaam! Blaaam! at the door. The Porktown family scuttles into position, but what busts in the door is far more than expected. It is Hägar the Horrible, the nightmare of hair, a wall of a man."

Neely segues into multiple fantasy sequences that have nothing to do with what is actually going on in the film. One such scene is where Hagrid ("Hägar the Horrible") is explaining Norbert's egg. Instead of regaling Hagrid's encounter with a strange man in a bar, Hägar tells of how Val-Mart impregnated him with the egg, resulting in his survival of a shark attack. Another such scene is where the trio of young wizards encounter Fluffy for the second time and are about to jump down the trap door. Harmony is allegedly decapitated and resurrected without those events occurring onscreen. One of the most elaborate divergences is the sequence where Neville ("the boy known as Upfish") loses control of his broom. Neely narrates Harry's daydream climbing his parents' giant rotten wedding cake thanks to Dumbledore's body ("using his old ribcage, mouth sockets and such for footholds"). As Harry goes to retrieve a winged key at the finale, Neely narrates that Harry goes into a waking dream-like trance. The entire scene is dominated by a rambling vision of Harry's in which he conquers the American continent with a telescope, teaching the natives spells, "and they in turn teach him how to fly across the continent at ridiculous speeds. He learns to slay deer with laser beams from his eyes, and how to make all things around the house out of buffalo parts".

There are also many references to other works throughout: Professor Flitwick is referred to as "Professor Ugnaught" in reference to his similar appearance to the Ugnaughts of Bespin in The Empire Strikes Back, while Val-Mart is made Harry's true father à la Darth Vader. At one point Harry puts on the invisibility cloak and Neely exclaims "Invisibility ON!", as per the Human Torch of the Fantastic Four. Hägar introduces himself as "gatekeeper and keymaster" in reference to Ghostbusters. Neely even refers to future Potter films when he claims that the children are on their way to the Chamber of Secrets.

== Naming ==
A recurring theme in Wizard People is the changing of characters' and locations' names.

Original	"Wizard People" Name
Albus Dumbledore	Dumbledore the Half-dead / Near-Dead Dumbledore
Minerva McGonagall	Hardcastle McCormick / Softcastle McCormick
Rubeus Hagrid	Hägar the Horrible / Hägar the Nightmare of Hair
Harry Potter	H.P., Master P, and others
Dudley Dursley	(ragtime) Roast-Beefy Weefs / Roast-Beefy O'Weefy
Vernon Dursley	various names with a pig theme (e.g. Saltporker, Porkstar, Uncle Baconface, Gigglesnort)
Professor Quirrell	Professor Queerman
Mr Ollivander	Ed Vanders
Voldemort	Val-Mart The Scar Maker / Scar Artist / Dracula
Ron Weasley	Ronnie the Bear / Ronnie the Effing Bear / Ron Weasel / Ron The Mighty
Molly Weasley	Irish lady
Hermione Granger	The Wretched Harmony / The Wretch
Neville Longbottom	Upfish Sinclair
Marcus Flint	Joey Lumbermouth / Woodpile
Adrian Pucey	Ernie
Draco Malfoy	Mouthoil / Malfoil
Argus Filch	Dazzler (Man-servant to Bloody-eyed Cat of Security / the Cat's man whore)
Mrs. Norris	The Bloody-eyed Cat / Head of Security
Severus Snape	Snake, Hideous Woman, Wicked Woman
Hedwig	Turkish Massage Owl, Post Office Bird
Madam Hooch	Catface Meowmers
Oliver Wood	Major Wood
Professor Flitwick	Professor Ugnaught (The Happy Pizza)
Nicolas Flamel	Nick Flannel
Remembrall	Ball filled with mother's blood
Quidditch	Cribbage
Diagon Alley	Calgon Alley
Gringotts Bank	The Goblin Bank of Wobble-Columns
Hufflepuff	Hufferpuffer
Ravenclaw	Viacom
House Cup	Stanley Cup
Prefect	RA (Resident Assistant)
Hospital Wing	The nurse's zone of awesome bedtime succors
Restricted Section	Adult books
Nimbus 2000	Necromo-B-Nimbrosa Alla Fassa Gosso
Quaffle	The "big ball"
Seeker	Sneaker
Keeper	Goalie
Centaur	Man-horse
Devil's Snare	Spaghetti
Gryffindor common room	Gryffindor parlor
Owl	Post office bird / Turkish massage owl
The Mirror of Erised	The Gate of Heaven
The Sorting Hat	Oogity-Boogity hat / grind-dancing hat
The Bloody Baron	The Count of Reeds
The Fat Friar	Little John
J. K. Rowling	J.K. R-Dogs
Unknown	Facer
Unknown	Monster Mash
Unknown	Otter Pop
Unknown	Tony the Shrimp
Unknown	Valazquez
Unknown	Yellow
Unknown	Zoomacroom

== The CDs ==
This soundtrack is composed of two audio CDs, which were made available for free download in MP3 format. The CDs must be played simultaneously with a DVD of the first Harry Potter film, preferably the North American DVD, muted or at low volume.

Two versions of the CD set have been released: the first in summer 2004 and the second in early-mid-2005. As of February 2007, only the second version is available on the Illegal Art website, while the original is available at Brad Neely's website, Creased Comics. The two versions are very similar: differences include "fixing" the weaker lines from the first version, and a more polished and thoroughly-rehearsed performance by Brad.

The first version's CDs can be played completely continuously, and there is no need to alter the discs' timing or volume. In order to play the second version continuously, a delay of approximately three seconds must be inserted between the CDs, and the tracks' volume must be normalized, as the first disc is significantly quieter (approximately 7.7 decibels less) than the second.

== See also ==
- Parodies of Harry Potter
- Neo-Benshi
