= Cecilia Dougherty =

Cecilia Dougherty creates videotapes and digital films which focus on the themes of lesbianism and popular culture. While her early work places lesbians in a cultural territory separate from mainstream society, other projects portray the lesbian experience in terms of commonly held norms; in her own words, "the life of an ordinary lesbian and her working-class family."

Her work, which is created primarily as video art, is actually not chiefly 'about' lesbianism, but is about the nature of individual experience within society, with strong psychological themes. She uses biography, essay, portraiture and autobiography to examine the nature of human experience.

An early influence in Dougherty's life was the poetry of Robert Graves.

She holds a PhD in Media Philosophy from the European Graduate School. Her video works are archived at the Berkeley Art Museum and Pacific Film Archive. She is based in New York.

== Videography ==
- Lynne (2004), 6.00, portrait of writer Lynne Tillman
- Kevin and Cedar (2002), 8:30, portrait of writers Kevin Killian and Cedar Sigo
- Gone (2001), 36:42, dual projection video installation, experimental documentary
- Eileen (2000), 10:20, portrait of writer Eileen Myles
- Laurie (1998), 11:02, portrait of writer Laurie Weeks
- Leslie (1998), 11:04, portrait of writer Leslie Scalapino
- Untitled (Crash) (1997), video installation, collaboration with sculptor Taylor Davis
- The dream and the waking (1997), 15:10, experimental documentary video
- My Failure to Assimilate (1995), 20:00, experimental documentary video
- I’m Leaving Home Without You (You Make Me Feel (Mighty Real)), (1994), single channel video installation
- Joe-Joe (1993), 52:00, experimental biography, video collaboration with artist Leslie Singer
- In flux (1993), 50:00, video diary, collaboration with Leslie Singer
- The Drama of the Gifted Child (1992), 5:30, video essay
- Meet Me in Saint Louis, Fuck Me in Kansas City (1992), video diary, collaboration with artist Leslie Singer
- Coal Miner’s Granddaughter (1991), 80:00, fictionalized autobiography
- Hello World, Goodbye San Francisco (1991), 35:00, video diary, collaboration with artist Leslie Singer
- The Temptation of Jane (1990), 50:00, video diary, collaboration with artist Leslie Singer
- The Passion of Jane (1990), 11:00, video letter
- Grapefruit (1989), 39:10, experimental documentary
- Kathy (1988), 12:00, video essay
- Claudia (1987), 7:50, video essay
- Coat of Arms I (1987), 16:00, essay, slow scan video capture
- Coat of Arms II (1987), 8:00, essay, edited version of slow scan video
- 76 Trombones (1987), 3:30, experimental video
- Fuck You Purdue (1987), 12:00, video plagiarism based on the work of artist Howard Fried
- Birdland (1986), 16:00, narrative
- Sick (1986), 5:30, documentary
- Gay Tape: Butch and Femme (1985), 26:00, documentary
