= Robert Banks (filmmaker) =

American filmmaker (born 1966)

- Born: Robert C. Banks, Jr. September 7, 1966 (age 59); Cleveland, Ohio, U.S.
- Occupation: Experimental filmmaker

Robert C. Banks, Jr. (born September 7, 1966) is an American experimental filmmaker.

== Biography ==
Banks attended the Cleveland School of the Arts and has taught film at Cuyahoga Community College, the Cleveland Institute of Art, and Cleveland State University.

His best known work is the 1992 the mixed media film essay, X: The Baby Cinema, a 4.5 minute, 16 mm short film which chronicled the commercial appropriation of the image of Malcolm X. It was met with disdain from director Spike Lee who made the biopic that same year.

The 1994 feature documentary film, You Can't Get a Piece of Mind explores the world of Cleveland musician and Vietnam veteran, Dan "Supie T" Theman.

Banks has had his films shown at the Sundance Film Festival, was named Filmmaker of the Year at the Midwest Filmmakers Conference, and in 2000, he was the honored guest filmmaker in London at the BBC British Short Film Festival.

Banks lives in Cleveland, Ohio.

== Filmography ==
- (1989) Untitled (16 mm)
- (1990) Froggy Central (16 mm)
- (1992) Eyes (16 mm)
- (1993) X The Baby Cinema (16 mm)
- (1994) My First Drug....The Idiot Box (16 mm)
- (1996) You Can't Get a Piece of Mind (16 mm)
- (1997) MPG: Motion Picture Genocide (35 mm)
- (1998) Jaded (35 mm)
- (1999) Outlet (35 mm)
- (1999) Embryonic (35 mm)
- (1999) Gold Fish Sunflowers (35 mm)
- (1999) Bone Face (35 mm)
- (1999) Love Rusty (8 mm/16 mm/35 mm)
- (2000) Rage Against the Dying Light
- (2002) Autopilot
- (2003) The Devil's Filmmaker: Bohica (cinematographer only)
- (2004) A.W.O.L. (35 mm)
- (2004) Banks vs. Barney (parody of Matthew Barney's Cremaster)
- (2006) Cordoba Nights (A.K.A. 'A Corboba in Bronston') Directed by Luke and Andy Campbell-(16 mm) (co-director of photography only)
- (2019) Paper Shadows (16 mm)
- (2022) Color Me Bone Face

== Awards ==
- Filmmaker of the Year (2001), Midwest Filmmakers Conference
- Jury Citation Award for Outlet, Black Mariah Film Festival
- Prize Pieces Award, National Black Programming Consortium
- Best Experimental for X-The Baby Cinema (1993), The First NY Underground Film Festival
- Won Audience Choice Award for Paper Shadows (2019), at the Chicago Underground Film Festival 2020

== See also ==
- Experimental film
- Structuralist film theory
- Collage film
