= Jim Finn (filmmaker) =

American independent film director and screenwriter

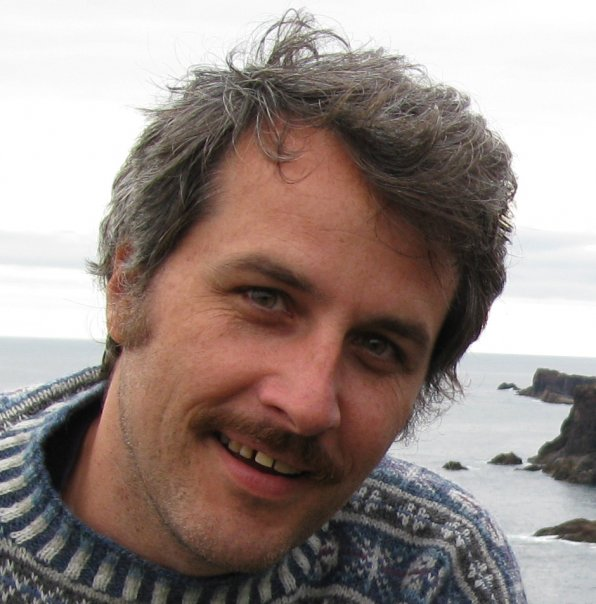
Jim Finn

Jim Finn is the writer/director of what have been called "Utopian comedies." His Communist trilogy of short features is the permanent collection of the MoMA. The first Interkosmos (71 minutes, 2006) is about an East German space colonization mission. The second feature La Trinchera Luminosa del Presidente Gonzalo (60 minutes, 2007) is about a day in the life of a Shining Path women's prison cellblock. The third film in the trilogy The Juche Idea (62 minutes, 2008) is about an artist residency in North Korea. He has been making short films and videos since 1999. His work is available through VDB, Ovid TV, and DA Films.

From 2013-2015 he premiered each of his Inner Trotsky Child films at the New York Film Festival. The first of these is Encounters with Your Inner Trotsky Child, then Zinoviev's Tube: Tape 2 of the Inner Trotsky Child Series, and Chums from Across the Void.

His nonfiction travelogue The Annotated Field Guide of Ulysses S. Grant (61 min, 2020) premiered at Dok Leipzig and played internationally. His psychedelic portrait of the Apostle Paul called The Apocalyptic is the Mother of All Christian Theology won the Critic's Jury Prize at the Pesaro Festival of New Cinema. He premiered a live music version of the film at the Sleeping Giant Festival in Jacksonville, Florida.

He was born in 1968 in St. Louis, Missouri and teaches at Pratt Institute. He started making movies in Chicago in the late 1990s and became a fixture on the underground film and microcinema scene. His short videos appeared at festivals like the International Film Festival Rotterdam, New York Underground Film Festival, Chicago Underground Film Festival and many others. His first feature, Interkosmos premiered at the International Film Festival Rotterdam in 2006 and was called a "retro gust of communist utopianism" in the Village Voice. His second feature made the Top 10 in Experimental Film at the Village Voice in 2007. The Juche Idea has screened at the Museum of Modern Art in New York City, and was produced as part of the Hallwalls Artist-in-Residence Project.
