= Aleesa Cohene =

Canadian artist

- Education: University of Toronto; Kunsthochschule für Medien; Toronto Film School; York University
- Occupations: Artist; Founder/Creative Director, I Know You Know (Creative Agency)
- Known for: Video Artist, Olfactory artist, Performance Artist
- Website: aleesacohene.com

Aleesa Cohene (born 1976 in Vancouver) is a Canadian visual artist based in Los Angeles.

Cohene's practice explores appropriation in media arts, sculpture, and scent, reflecting on broader conversations around the production and circulation of cultural material. Cohene typically works with found materials, scavenging, replicating, and remixing images, sounds, and objects. Their work explores the questions these practices provoke—about transgression, intervention, cultural appropriation, ownership, property, and power.

Their work has been shown in major Canadian museums and galleries in multiple provinces including The Power Plant (Ontario), Contemporary Calgary, MacKenzie Art Gallery (Saskatchewan), and Confederation Centre Art Gallery (PEI). They have been awarded residencies in Canada, the U.S., Denmark, and the Netherlands, and their work has screened internationally. The 2017 project I Don't Get It was commissioned by three major Canadian institutions (The Western Front, The Rooms, and Gallery 44 Centre for Contemporary Photography) for a solo exhibition tour across Canada. Cohene's work is part of the permanent collection of Oakville Galleries, and has been acquired by private collectors.

In 2021, Cohene founded the multidisciplinary creative agency I Know You Know, which works with arts and cultural institutions, artists, scholars and culturally conscious businesses and brands. The agency works with a team of international artists and designers to produce visual identities, digital projects, publications, and environments.

== Education ==
Cohene studied at York University (Philosophy and Religion) and the Toronto Film School (Editorial). They completed a fellowship at the Kunsthochschule für Medien, Cologne, under the mentorship of German experimental filmmaker Matthias Müller in 2010. Cohene also holds a Master's of Visual Studies from the University of Toronto (2013).

== Film and video work ==
Cohene began producing video art in the early 2000s and was quickly recognized for their early work with awards such as the 2004 Images Festival “Best Emerging Artist” Award and Impakt Festival's “Most Remarkable Production” Award. Working primarily in single-channel video at that time, Cohene had already developed a methodology for creating what they call “composites”— combining common gestures, expressions, emotions, and language from a variety of actors into a single character or archetype. The approach to composite characters soon evolved into multi-channel installations, with each video channel embodying a particular composite character. Building from a methodologically constructed archive they have been assembling since the 2000s, Cohene has become known for their expertly edited audiovisual collages, telling oblique, strongly atmospheric stories.

Cohene's work often explores queer identity, race, intimacy, capitalism, and the ways political identities and experiences of injustice bear on human relationships. In working with found footage, they often explore the narratives, emotional landscapes, and political realities that Hollywood movies obscure.

Cohene's practice also includes installations, sculptural work, scent-based art, and dance performances that are often presented in relation to their video work.

== Olfactory and performance art ==
Cohene describes the evolution of working with scent in their practice as a way to address embodied emotions and ideas that cannot be easily translated visually. Many of their exhibition environments include scent, such as in the projects Like Like (2009), That's Why We End (2012), I Know You Know (2014), and I Don't Get It (2017).

From 2013 to 2016, Cohene worked in collaboration with German dancers Jared Gradinger and Angela Schubot, producing a dance work that toured in Berlin, Mannheim, and Toronto. In 2016, the group developed and presented the work at Gallery TPW, in Toronto, Canada in a residency with theorist and filmmaker Eric Cazdyn.

In 2015, Cohene was invited to learn and perform Yvonne Rainer's choreography Transmitting Trio A (1966), along with a mixed group of dance and performance artists. Cohene also regularly collaborates with dancers and choreographers including Canadian choreographer Ame Henderson, dancer Mairi Greig, and dancers/choreographers Jared Gradinger and Angela Schubot.

== Exhibitions ==
Cohene's projects have been widely shown across Canada, the United States, and Europe. Their work has also screened at numerous film festivals in Canada, the United States, France, Germany, the Netherlands, Sweden, Istanbul, Finland, Greece, the UK, Indonesia, and Brazil.

=== Solo exhibitions ===
- Something Better, Flatland Gallery, Utrecht, The Netherlands, 2007
- Something Better, Galerie Articule, Montreal, Canada, 2008
- Something Better, YYZ Artist Outlet, Toronto, Canada, 2009
- Like, Like, Glasmoog Gallery, Cologne, Germany, 2010
- The Rest is Real, Vtape, Toronto, Canada, 2012
- Yes, Angel, Galerie Suvi Lehtinen, Berlin, Germany, 2012
- Yes, Angel, Reykjavík Museum of Photography, Iceland, 2013
- I Told You That Might Happen, Diaz Contemporary, Toronto, Canada, 2013
- I Know You Know, Oakville Galleries, Canada, 2015
- The Same Problem with Benny Nemer, Dunlop Art Gallery, Regina, Canada, 2016
- I Don't Get It, Gallery 44 Centre for Contemporary Photography, Toronto, Canada, 2017
- I Don't Get It, The Rooms, St. John's, Canada, 2018
- I Don't Get It, The Western Front, Vancouver, Canada, 2018
- Kathy, The Shell Projects and Scotiabank Contact Photography Festival, Toronto, Canada, 2020

=== Group exhibitions ===
- Lost and Found: Querying the Archive, Kunsthalle Nikolaj, Copenhagen, Denmark, 2009
- I haven't been a figment of my own imagination, SBC Gallery, Montreal, Canada, 2009
- Signal + Noise Media Art Festival, VIVO Media Arts Centre, Vancouver, Canada, 2010
- Seemed Like a Good Idea at the Time, Or Gallery, Vancouver, Canada, 2010
- Like, Like, Preview Berlin Art Fair with Galerie Suvi Lehtinen, Germany, 2011
- Liminal Work, Galerie Suvi Lehtinen, Berlin, Germany, 2011
- Emotional Blackmail, Southern Alberta Art Gallery, Canada, 2011
- Freedom of Assembly, Oakville Galleries, Canada, 2012
- Coming After, The Power Plant, Toronto, Canada 2012
- Slash: In Between the Normative and Fantasy, kim? Contemporary Art Centre, Riga, Latvia, 2015
- Memories of the Future, Campbell House, Toronto, Canada, 2015
- Rehearsal for Objects Lie on a Table, Justina M. Barnicke Gallery, University of Toronto, Canada, 2016
- The Accursed Share, Artspeak, Vancouver, Canada, 2016
- Vivre ensemble – The Connections, Foreman Art Gallery, Bishops University, Sherbrooke, Canada, 2017
- Nasty, Daniel Faria Gallery, Toronto, Canada, 2017
- Human Capital, MacKenzie Art Gallery, Regina, Canada, 2021
- Human Capital, Contemporary Calgary, Canada, 2022
- Human Capital, Confederation Centre Art Gallery, Charlottetown, Canada, 2023

== Awards and honours ==
Cohene has been longlisted for the Sobey Art Award (Canada's largest prize for young Canadian artists) multiple times: in 2010, 2011, and 2012. They were awarded the 2012 Artist Award from the Toronto Friends of the visual Arts, and have been the recipient of multiple grants and awards from the Canada Council for the Arts and the Ontario Arts Council. In 2018, they were a finalist for the Sadakichi Award for Experimental Work with Scent, The Art and Olfaction Awards. They were a finalist for the 2020 Barbara Hammer Grant, an award for experimental filmmakers supported by the estate of Barbara Hammer.
