= New York Underground Film Festival =

American film event

The New York Underground Film Festival was an annual event that occurred each March at Anthology Film Archives in New York City from 1994 through 2008. It was founded by filmmakers Todd Phillips (Road Trip, Old School) and Andrew Gurland. After Phillips and Gurland turned the festival over to programmer Ed Halter, it became noted for documentary and experimental film programming, and occasionally courted controversy, particularly in its early years.

Some of these have included: premiering the North American Man/Boy Love Association (NAMBLA) documentary Chicken Hawk: Men Who Love Boys in 1994; premiering a film in 1995 that accused Quentin Tarantino of plagiarism; being protested by Reverend Fred Phelps in 2002 (apparently for not choosing to show a film about Phelps); and premiering a theatrical version of Brad Neely's Harry Potter parody Wizard People, Dear Reader, which eventually led to action by Warner Brothers to suppress future theatrical performances of the work.

Nevertheless, though the festival has remained a small affair, and has little value as a market, its programming has attained a certain prestige, especially among younger or more experimental filmmakers. The first year showcased the work of independent animator Bill Plympton. The New York Times described the event "as a collection of love and independence".

In February 2008 the festival organizers announced that, instead of passing on the torch to a younger generation—as has been the tradition—the 15th festival would be the last. Instead two of the former organizers intend to create a new festival under the name Migrating Forms (taking the name from a film by James Fotopoulos).

== List of films shown ==
- 15th festival, April 2–8, 2008
- 14th festival, March 28 - April 3, 2007
- 13th festival, March 8–14, 2006
- 12th festival, March 9–15, 2005
- 11th festival, March 10–16, 2004
- 10th festival, March 5–11, 2003
- 9th festival, March 6–12, 2002
- 8th festival, March 7–13, 2001
- 7th festival, March 8–14, 2000
- 6th festival, March 10–14, 1999
- 5th festival, March 18–22, 1998
- 4th festival, March 19–23, 1997
