= Rankin Renwick =

American artist and filmmaker

Rankin Renwick (born 1961) is an American artist and filmmaker living in Portland, Oregon. Since 1981, they have been working in experimental and documentary forms—writing, producing films, videos, photography, sculpture and installations. In 1996, they started their own production company, called The Oregon Department of Kick Ass. Renwick's art reflects an interest in place, landscape use and transformation, as well as relationships between bodies and landscapes.

Renwick was born in Chicago, Illinois.

== Exhibitions ==
Renwick has created over fifty works that have been shown internationally at sites such as The Centre Pompidou, Museum of Modern Art, The Kitchen, International Film Festival Rotterdam, The Viennale, and The Andy Warhol Museum.

In 2009, with Brian Borrello, she created People's Bike Library of Portland (also known as Zoobomb Pyle) part of the City of Portland and Multnomah County Public Art Collection. In 2013, a 2-day retrospective of her work, "Raw, Raucous and Sublime: 33 ½ Years of Vanessa Renwick" was presented by Oregon Movies, A to Z at the Hollywood Theater in Portland, Oregon.

== Awards ==
Renwick has received several film festival awards, including:

- The Gus Van Sant Award for Best Experimental Film at the Ann Arbor Film Festival (2005)
- The Judges Award at the Northwest Film and Video Festival from Michael Almereyda (2005)
- "The DIY of All-Time Award", The Judges Award from the Northwest Filmmakers' Festival from Mike Plante (2013)
- Bonnie Bronson Fellowship (2014)

== See also ==
- Lovejoy Columns
