= J. X. Williams =

Multi-author pseudonym

J. X. Williams is a pseudonym used by several different authors during the 1960s for many adult novels. It was used accidentally on the cover of Ed Wood's novel Parisian Passions (Ed Wood's name was on the title page), and it had been used by author Victor J. Banis, among others.

More recently, the name J. X. Williams has been used as a pseudonym for film director Noel Lawrence on such films as Peep Show, and The Virgin Sacrifice.
