= James Fotopoulos =

Independent film maker (born 1976)

James Fotopoulos (born 1976, Norridge, Illinois) is an independent filmmaker whose work is low-budget and rigorous, and consists of experimental narrative features, non-narrative shorts, and video installations. He began creating his film projects as a teenager in 1993, and as of 2012, has made over 100 films and videos.

== Partial filmography ==
- Zero (1997)
- Drowning (2000)
- Migrating Forms (2000)
- Insect (2001)
- Christabel (2001)
- Consumed (in 5-parts) (2001)
- Back Against the Wall (2002)
- Families (2002)
- Hymn (2002)
- The River (2002)
- The Swan (2002)
- The Nest (2003)
- Conjunction (2003)
- Jerusalem (2003)
- Sublimation (2003)
- The Fountain (2003)
- The Hemispheres (2003)
- Esophagus (2004)
- The Ant Hill (2004)
- The Pearl (2004)
- 30.40 (2005)
- Shattered (2005)
- Spine Face (2005)
- The Mirror Mask (2005)
- The Hard-Boiled Egg (2006)
- Trinity (2006)
- Go Back and Watch It (2007)
- Knot 1 (2007)
- Knot 2 (2007)
- Knot 3 (2007)
- Knot 4 (2007)
- Knot 5 (2007)
- Knot 6 (2007)
- Knot 7 (2007)
- Knot 8 (2007)
- Sleep Weep (The Zookeeper) (2007)
- Tape 1 (2007)
- The Discovery (2007)
- The Sky Song (2007)
- Untitled (Thanks, Get in...) (2008)
- Surprise! (2009)
- Alice in Wonderland (2010)
- Thick Comb (2011)
- Chimera (2011)
- Dignity (2012)
- THERE (2014)
- The Given (2015)
- Two Girls (2018)

== Recognition ==
Fotopoulos' work was featured in the 2004 Whitney Biennial and he has collaborated with media artist Cory Arcangel.

The Film Journal praises Fotopoulos, writing he is "one of cinema's most unique voices, a filmmaker of uncompromising vision."

Of Fotopoulos' film Migrating Forms, Amy Taubin of The Village Voice wrote that while it was not a pleasurable experience, the film stayed with her most vividly as a "kind of stripped-down Eraserhead", which offered "a formal purity and obsessive power that's all too rare these days".

=== Awards and nominations ===
- 2000 won Best Feature at New York Underground Film Festival for Migrating Forms
- 2005 Creative Capital Grant Film/Video

== Personal ==
James Fotopoulos was raised in Norridge, Illinois. His father was a policeman and his mother a hairdresser. He displayed artistic aptitude as a child and devoted his attention to filmmaking at age 15. His 1997 film Zero, shot when he was 18 years old during his first year as a film student at Columbia College Chicago, was his first feature. In 1998 James founded his production company Fantasma Inc.
