= List of China, IL episodes =

China, IL (meaning China, Illinois) is an American adult animated sitcom created by Brad Neely for Cartoon Network's late night programming block, Adult Swim. The series takes place at the "Worst College in America", located at the edge of town. The school's poor reputation is celebrated by the school's uncaring faculty and staff. Steve and Frank Smith (voiced by Neely) are twin professors at the college, teaching history with limited success, while Professor Leonard Cakes (voiced by Jeffrey Tambor) is the father of undergraduate Mark "Baby" Cakes (also voiced by Neely), who spends his time at college with the school staff. Pony Merks (voiced by Greta Gerwig) is the teacher's aide for the history department at the school, and the most rational of the staff, but still willing to go along with the staff's insane plots to avoid working.

The series was originally conceived as a web series on Adult Swim's defunct comedy website, Super Deluxe, in 2008. Neely, who had done Baby Cakes and The Professor Brothers shorts for Super Deluxe in 2006, envisioned the characters in each series to coexist in the same universe. With the relationship in mind, he produced a four-part internet series entitled China, IL, which was published on Super Deluxe in 2008. An 11-minute special combining the shorts, entitled "China, IL: The Funeral", aired on Adult Swim on May 25, 2008. The series officially premiered on October 2, 2011, and ended on June 14, 2015 with a total of 30 episodes.

== Series overview ==
Season	Episodes	Originally released	
Season	Episodes	First released	Last released
Pilots	2 (1 unaired)	May 25, 2008	January 10, 2010
1	10	October 2, 2011	March 4, 2012
2	10	September 22, 2013	November 24, 2013
3	10	April 5, 2015	June 14, 2015

== Episodes ==
=== Pilots (2008–10) ===
Title	Directed by	Written by	Original release date
"China, IL: The Funeral"	Brad Neely	Brad Neely; Michael Crow	May 25, 2008
Baby Cakes finds the diary of a dead professor. This 4-act special was originally made for Super Deluxe, and was drawn in the style of Neely's Creased Comics videos.
Unaired pilot	Brad Neely; Chris Prynoski	Brad Neely	January 10, 2010

=== Season 1 (2011–12) ===
No. overall	No. in season	Title	Original release date	Prod. code	US viewers (millions)
1	1	"Rewind, Pause, Pay!"	October 2, 2011	101	0.88
A time-traveling Ronald Reagan attempts to have his revenge on Professor Steve Smith for doing Reagan impressions in a talent show.
2	2	"Dean vs. Mayor"	October 9, 2011	102	1.06
The Mayor is tired of the riots sparked by UCI after the latest one following a math competition and challenges The Dean to an arm wrestling contest for control of the school.
3	3	"Baby Boom"	October 16, 2011	103	1.09
When a freak accident causes a science experiment to go horribly wrong, the college has to deal with a giant baby on campus.
4	4	"Coming Out of the Casket"	October 23, 2011	104	1.07
The ghost of a dead professor (Jason Alexander) becomes a little too friendly with Professor Frank, while Steve and Crystal wage war over who will have more students for the upcoming semester.
5	5	"Secret Society"	October 30, 2011	105	1.15
Steve becomes a tenured professor while Pony blackmails The Dean, threatening to expose his sexual fetishism for old strippers, to gain tenure herself.
6	6	"Prom Face/Off"	November 6, 2011	106	1.06
The staff-only prom is held in a condemned building formerly used by Professor Cakes, and Baby Cakes falls for a feral girl with a dark secret.
7	7	"Chinese New Year"	December 27, 2011	108	N/A
The students all fail their finals and the governor threatens to shut down UCI unless they retake the exams and pass. Professor Cakes builds robotic replicas of the professors so they don’t have to teach, but the robots revolt when they learn that the New Year’s ball drop will trigger a self-destruct mechanism.
8	8	"Frankensteve"	February 19, 2012	107	1.28
After suffering near-fatal internal injuries from the annual Faculty League Wrestling match, Professors Frank and Steve are joined at the hip to save both their lives, but use their newly joined body to start winning wrestling matches instead.
9	9	"Dream Reamer"	February 26, 2012	109	N/A
Baby Cakes "friends" his imaginary friend Dream Reamer on Facebook. Now Baby Cakes must go back into the dream world to defeat Reamer.
10	10	"The Dean's List"	March 4, 2012	110	1.04
The Dean issues his Dean's List, which forces professors and students to form teams and compete in a scavenger hunt, which he watches on monitors with China, Illinois' elites, including Baby Cakes. However, to make the contest more interesting, the Dean turns the scavenger hunt into a Running Man-style fight for survival.

=== Season 2 (2013) ===
No. overall	No. in season	Title	Written by	Original release date	Prod. code	US viewers (millions)
11	1	"The Perfect Lecture"	Brad Neely	September 22, 2013	201	1.28
Frank wants to give a perfect lecture on the first day of school, then repeats the process over and over when he stumbles onto the perfect one about Benedict Arnold. Meanwhile, Pony is paranoid about aging after finding a grey hair.
12	2	"Is College Worth It?"	Story by : Brad Neely; Teleplay by : Rebecca Addelman & Brad Neely	September 29, 2013	206	1.28
Pony must take drastic measures to afford UCI's recently raised tuition, while Baby Cakes turns himself into Robin Hood, prompting The Dean to call for Kevin Costner's head. Frank and Steve con their students into giving them extra cash so they can afford to buy jetskis.
13	3	"Do You Know Who You Look Like?"	Brad Neely	October 6, 2013	208	1.51
The history department hires two new professors: One looks just like Steve and starts impersonating him on campus, the other is a Southern belle who captures Frank's attention. Later, Pony is forced to take an extra language course and reveals she doesn't know how to speak Spanish.
14	4	"The Diamond Castle"	Story by : Brad Neely; Teleplay by : Jack Kukoda & Brad Neely	October 13, 2013	205	1.43
Frank, Baby Cakes, and Ronald Reagan search for Thomas Jefferson's secret diamond castle. While they're gone, Steve has to show an inspector named Polly a good time so she'll give UCI's history department its accreditation.
15	5	"Kenny Winker Rules"	Brad Neely	October 20, 2013	203	1.40
Kenny Winker performs a concert in China, IL and is giving away one ticket to hang out with him on his tour bus, The Garden of Hedon. However, a meeting with Baby Cakes makes him question the lyrics of his own songs. Elsewhere, Pony enters into a relationship with a giant bed bug.
16	6	"China-Man Begins"	Brad Neely	October 27, 2013	207	1.73
Frank bets everyone a plate of cheese sticks that he'll become the "Person of the Day" on the local news within a week. Steve and Pony go to extremes to prove to everyone that they're not in love. Baby Cakes tries to deal with new feelings brought on by a salacious chicken nuggets commercial.
17	7	"Total Validation"	Brad Neely	November 3, 2013	209	1.55
Professor Cakes and Baby Cakes go to Total Validation, a new clinic designed to help those in troubled relationships. Steve lets Frank and Pony borrow his Miata while he and his latest girlfriend spend the weekend at her parents' lake house. Things quickly go sour when Steve argues with her about Toy Movie 3.
18	8	"Surfer God"	Story by : Brad Neely; Teleplay by : Rebecca Addelman & Brad Neely	November 10, 2013	204	1.57
God returns to Earth in the form of a surfer dude and starts rewriting his own Ten Commandments, but his appearance leads to the spread of a Beach Boys theme around campus, which Steve can't tolerate. Meanwhile, Professor Cakes uses Frank to test out his new invention, the "Haardvark."
19	9	"Prank Week"	Brad Neely	November 17, 2013	202	1.56
Frank becomes a Buddhist monk after being exiled from the university for playing a forbidden prank on Steve during "Prank Week". After dreaming about Joe McCarthy's "witch hunts" during a lecture, Baby Cakes decides to capture various professors who he suspects are witches, leading to rumors of a serial killer roaming China, IL.
20	10	"Wild Hogs"	Story by : Brad Neely; Teleplay by : Jack Kukoda & Brad Neely	November 24, 2013	210	1.14
The UCI history professors place suggestion boxes in their classrooms, but one student's prank message in Frank's box convinces him to turn anorexic. Baby Cakes helps a foreign transfer student he calls "Aladdin" around campus, convinced that he's a genie. Overwhelmed by his worst fear, an infestation of wild "brown hogs" on campus, The Dean shuts himself off from the world and gives Pony carte blanche to bring the problem under control.

=== Season 3 (2015) ===
No. overall	No. in season	Title	Directed by	Original release date	Prod. code	US viewers (millions)
21	1	"A Gentleman's Bet"	Griffith Kimmins	April 5, 2015	301	1.52
Frank and Steve make a secret bet involving their students, while Pony and Baby Cakes get caught in a think tank.
22	2	"Best Face Forward"	Angelo Hatgistavrou	April 12, 2015	302	1.44
Frank's anus learns to speak, and quickly becomes a world-famous stand-up comedian. Meanwhile Steve becomes ensnared in a net of white brothers.
23	3	"Charlize"	Griffith Kimmins	April 19, 2015	304	1.12
When a mysterious purple fog leaves Earth almost uninhabited, Pony searches for clues as to what happened before she becomes a victim.
24	4	"Crow College"	Angelo Hatgistavrou	April 26, 2015	309	1.41
After learning that Crows have the intelligence of 4-year old humans, The Dean enrolls a murder of them at UCI as new students. Baby Cakes has deep thoughts.
25	5	"Bi-Topping-Ality"	Angelo Hatgistavrou	May 3, 2015	303	1.16
The Mayor bans eating anchovies in China, IL, while Trump's Kid joins UCI as its newest student.
26	6	"Parent's Day"	Griffith Kimmins	May 10, 2015	305	1.36
Students, staff, and their relatives party on campus. Baby Cakes tries to get his parents back together.
27	7	"Displays of Manhood"	Griffith Kimmins	May 17, 2015	306	1.01
Frank proves his masculinity by challenging a boxing legend to a fight. Baby Cakes and Pony battle in a game of Dungeons and Dragons.
28	8	"Life Coaches"	Angelo Hatgistavrou	May 31, 2015	307	1.30
Steve, Frank, Pony and Baby Cakes become life coaches for each other.
29	9	"Gummie World"	Angelo Hatgistavrou	June 7, 2015	310	1.27
Steve and Baby Cakes strike it rich by using a 3D printer to make everyday items out of gummi candy. Frank falls in love with a pubic hair. Pony suspects Sammy is guilty of causing harm to Kim.
30	10	"Magical Pet" "China, IL The Musical"	Griffith Kimmins	June 14, 2015	308	1.05
Hour-long musical episode. Baby Cakes asks his dad for a magical pet to avoid willing himself to death, Frank tries a hair-growth treatment. Steve dates a satyr while Pony dates a cyclops.
