= List of programs broadcast by 2×2 =

This is a list of programs broadcast by 2x2, whether they aired in the past, are currently aired, or are scheduled to air in the future.

== Live-action series ==
- Comedy Central's TV Funhouse with Doug Dale
- The Whitest Kids U' Know (s1ep1 "Triumph of the ill (Hitler Rap)" was removed from TV broadcast, clip showed only on official 2x2 website)
- The Big Bang Theory
- Captain Power and the Soldiers of the Future
- Doctor Who
- Fraggle Rock
- Friends
- The Mighty Boosh
- Sledge Hammer!

=== Original productions ===
- 2X2 News
- Bazooka's Video Salon
- Cliptomaniacs
- Epic File
- Game Cops
- Immortal Movie
- Level Up Show
- Reutov TV
- Reutov TV Discovers Russia
- SuperOleg

== Animated films ==
- Aachi & Ssipak
- Akira
- American Pop
- Aqua Teen Hunger Force Colon Movie Film for Theaters
- Arrietty
- The Boy and the Beast
- Castle in the Sky
- Сhildren of the Sea
- Cowboy Bebop: The Movie
- The Drawn Together Movie: The Movie!
- First Squad
- Grave of the Fireflies
- Heavy Metal
- Howl's Moving Castle
- Kiki's Delivery Service
- Lil' Pimp
- Mirai
- Mutafukaz
- My Neighbor Totoro
- Paprika
- Ponyo
- Porco Rosso
- Princess Mononoke
- Promare
- The Prophet
- Sausage Party
- The Secret of Kells
- The Simpsons Movie
- Song of the Sea
- Spirited Away
- Steamboy
- Whisper of the Heart
- The Wind Rises

== Animated series ==
- 6teen
- 12 oz. Mouse
- Aaagh! It's the Mr. Hell Show!
- Action Man
- Adventure Time
- The Adventures of Peter and Wolf
- Æon Flux
- Allen Gregory
- All Grown Up!
- Aikatsu!
- Amazing Nurse Nanako
- The Amazing World of Gumball
- American Dad!
- Angelic Layer
- The Angry Beavers
- Animals (American TV series)
- Animaniacs
- Apollo Gauntlet
- Aqua Teen Hunger Force
- Aquarion
- Archer
- The Ark
- Armitage III
- Astro Boy (2003)
- Attack on Titan
- Avatar: The Last Airbender
- The Avengers: United They Stand
- Axe Cop
- Baby Blues
- Baby Looney Tunes
- Back at the Barnyard
- Baki the Grappler
- Baldr Force EXE Resolution
- Ballmastrz 9009
- Basilisk
- Batman: The Animated Series
- Batman Beyond
- Batman: The Brave and the Bold
- Beavis and Butt-Head
- Beetlejuice
- Berserk
- Biker Mice from Mars
- Black Blood Brothers
- Black Butler
- Black Lagoon
- Blassreiter
- Blazing Teens
- Bleach
- Blood+
- Bob and Margaret
- Bob's Burgers
- BoJack Horseman
- Bolts & Blip
- The Boondocks
- Brad Neely's Harg Nallin' Sclopio Peepio
- The Brak Show
- Bravest Warriors
- Brickleberry
- Bro'Town
- Bromwell High
- Bubble Bubble Cook
- Bubble Cook Expedition
- Burn-Up Scramble
- Camp Lazlo
- Candy Candy
- Captain Scarlet and the Mysterons
- Captain Star
- Catscratch
- Celebrity Deathmatch
- ChalkZone
- Chowder
- Chrono Crusade
- Clarence
- Class of 3000
- The Cleveland Show
- Clone High
- Close Enough
- Codename: Kids Next Door
- Conan the Adventurer
- Cosmic Cowboys
- Courage the Cowardly Dog
- Cow and Chicken
- Cowboy Bebop
- Coyote Ragtime Show
- The Cramp Twins
- Crapston Villas
- Crash Canyon
- Creature Comforts
- The Critic
- Cupcake & Dino: General Services
- Cyboars
- D.N.Angel
- Dan vs.
- Daphne in the Brilliant Blue
- Daria
- Dating Guy
- Death Note
- Desert Punk
- Devil May Cry: The Animated Series
- Dexter's Laboratory
- Diebuster
- Dinobabies
- Dinofroz
- Dilbert
- Downtown
- Dr. Katz, Professional Therapist
- Dragon Ball Z
- Dragon Ball Super
- Dragon Hunters
- Drawn Together
- The Drinky Crow Show
- Duckman
- Ed, Edd n Eddy
- Eek! The Cat
- El-Hazard: The Wanderers
- El Tigre: The Adventures of Manny Rivera
- Elfen Lied
- Ergo Proxy
- Exchange Student Zero
- Family Guy
- Fantastic Four
- Fantastic Four: The Animated Series
- Father of the Pride
- Fatherhood
- FLCL
- The Flintstones
- The Flintstone Comedy Show
- Foster's Home for Imaginary Friends
- Freak Show
- Fred's Head
- Friday: The Animated Series
- Frisky Dingo
- Fugget About It
- Full Metal Panic!
- Full Metal Panic? Fumoffu
- Full Metal Panic: The Second Raid
- Fullmetal Alchemist
- Futurama
- Future-Worm!
- Galactik Football
- Gankutsuou: The Count of Monte Cristo
- Gary and His Demons
- Gary the Rat
- Generator Rex
- Ghost Hound
- Ghost in the Shell: Stand Alone Complex
- Gilgamesh
- Glenn Martin, DDS
- Good Vibes
- The Goode Family
- Great Teacher Onizuka
- Gregory Horror Show (Removed from 2x2, at the request of RKN)
- Grenadier
- Grendizer
- The Grim Adventures of Billy & Mandy
- Growing Up Creepie
- Gun x Sword
- Gungrave
- Gunslinger Girl
- Gurren Lagann
- Haibane Renmei
- The Hakkenden
- Harvey Birdman, Attorney at Law
- He-Man and the Masters of the Universe
- The Head
- Hellsing
- Hey Joel
- High School Girls
- Home Movies
- Hot Streets (TV series)
- House of Rock
- Huntik: Secrets & Seekers
- I Am Weasel
- Ikki Tousen
- Immigrants
- The Incredible Hulk
- Innovators
- Invader Zim
- Iria: Zeiram the Animation
- Iron Man
- Iron Man: Armored Adventures
- Jeff & Some Aliens
- Jet Groove
- The Jetsons
- Jinki: Extend
- Joe 90
- John Callahan's Quads!
- Johnny Bravo
- Justice League (TV series)
- Justice League Unlimited
- KaBlam!
- Karas
- Karate Kommandos
- Kevin Spencer
- King Arthur's Disasters
- King of the Hill
- King Star King
- Kishin Corps
- KikoRiki
- Kung Fu Panda: Legends of Awesomeness
- Last Exile
- Lazor Wulf
- League of Super Evil
- The Legend of Korra
- The Life & Times of Juniper Lee
- The Life & Times of Tim
- Life's a Zoo
- Legends of Chamberlain Heights
- Littlest Pet Shop
- Loonatics Unleashed
- The Looney Tunes Show
- Lost Universe
- Lucy, the Daughter of the Devil
- Macross Plus
- MAD
- MaXi
- Mankatsu
- Marvel Knights
- The Marvel Super Heroes
- The Marvelous Misadventures of Flapjack
- Mary Shelley's Frankenhole
- The Mask
- Megas XLR
- Metalocalypse
- Minoriteam
- Mission Hill
- Mnemosyne
- Modern Toss
- Mongo Wrestling Alliance
- Monkey Dust
- Monsters vs. Aliens
- Monsuno
- Moonbeam City
- Moral Orel
- The Morph Files
- The Most Notorious "Talker" Runs the World's Greatest Clan
- Mr. Bean
- Mr. Pickles
- My Gym Partner's a Monkey
- My Little Pony
- Nageki no Bourei wa Intai shitai
- Napoleon Dynamite
- Naruto
- Naruto: Shippuden (ended until 318 episodes)
- Neighbors from Hell
- Neon Genesis Evangelion
- The New Adventures of Batman
- The New Adventures of Speed Racer
- The New Adventures of Superman
- The New Batman Adventures
- New Captain Scarlet
- New Fist of the North Star
- Ninja Scroll: The Series
- Ninjago: Masters of Spinjitzu
- Noir
- The Nutshack
- The Oblongs
- Odd Job Jack
- O'Grady
- One Piece
- OOglies
- Out There
- Paranoia Agent
- Parasite Dolls
- The Penguins of Madagascar
- Primal
- The Problem Solverz
- Perfect Hair Forever
- Pickle and Peanut
- Pippi Longstocking
- Pig Goat Banana Cricket
- Pinky and the Brain
- Planet Sheen
- Pokémon
- Pokémon: Black & White
- Pond Life
- Popetown
- The Powerpuff Girls (1998)
- The Powerpuff Girls (2016)
- PriPara
- Project Blue Earth SOS
- Pretty Rhythm
- Puppy in My Pocket: Adventures in Pocketville
- Qumi-Qumi
- Rabbids Invasion (Dub only on 2x2)
- Ragnarok the Animation
- Read or Die
- The Real Ghostbusters
- Regular Show
- The Ren & Stimpy Show
- Ren & Stimpy "Adult Party Cartoon"
- Revolutionary Girl Utena
- Rex the Runt
- Re:Zero
- Rick and Morty
- Ricky Gervais Show
- Ricky Sprocket: Showbiz Boy
- Rise of the Teenage Mutant Ninja Turtles
- The Ripping Friends
- RoboRoach
- Robot Chicken
- Robotech
- Rocket Monkeys
- Rubaki
- Ruby Gloom
- Sailor Moon
- Saladin: The Animated Series
- Sally the Witch
- Samurai 7
- Samurai Champloo
- Samurai Jack
- Sanjay and Craig
- Scooby-Doo, Where Are You!
- Sealab 2020
- Sealab 2021
- The Secret Saturdays
- The Secret Show
- Seth MacFarlane's Cavalcade of Cartoon Comedy
- Shaggy & Scooby-Doo Get a Clue!
- She-Ra: Princess of Power
- Sheep in the Big City
- The Shivering Truth
- Silver Surfer
- The Simpsons
- Sit Down, Shut Up
- Sidekick
- Skunk Fu!
- Skyland
- Slacker Cats
- Son of Zorn
- Sonic Boom
- Soul Music
- South Park
- Space Ghost Coast to Coast
- Spaceballs
- Static Shock
- Spawn
- Spectacular Spider-Man
- Speed Grapher
- Speed Racer
- Spice and Wolf
- Spicy City
- Spider-Man
- Spider-Man and His Amazing Friends
- Spider-Man Unlimited
- Spider-Woman
- Spliced
- SpongeBob SquarePants
- Squidbillies
- Squirrel Boy
- Stargate Infinity
- Star Wars: The Clone Wars (2008)
- Station Zero
- Storm Hawks
- The Strange Chores
- Stressed Eric
- Stripperella
- Stroker & Hoop
- Super Friends
- Superman: The Animated Series
- Superjail!
- Supermansion
- Tak and the Power of Juju
- Taz-Mania
- Teenage Mutant Ninja Turtles (1987)
- Teenage Mutant Ninja Turtles (2003)
- Teenage Mutant Ninja Turtles (2012)
- Tenkai Knights
- The Three Friends and Jerry
- ThunderCats (1987)
- ThunderCats (2011)
- The Tick
- Time Squad
- Titan Maximum
- Tokyo Ghoul
- Tokyo Majin
- Tom & Jerry Kids
- Tom and Jerry Show
- Tom and Jerry Tales
- Tom Goes to the Mayor
- Total Drama Action
- Total Drama All-Stars
- Total Drama Island
- Total Drama: Pahkitew Island
- Total Drama Presents: The Ridonculous Race
- Total Drama: Revenge of the Island
- Total Drama World Tour
- Total Dramarama
- The Trap Door
- Trigun
- Trinity Blood
- Tripping the Rift
- TripTank
- TV Funhouse
- The Twelve Kingdoms
- Ugly Americans
- Undergrads
- Uncle Grandpa
- Unsupervised
- Vandread
- The Venture Bros.
- VH1 ILL-ustrated
- Voltron
- Wallace and Gromit's World of Invention
- Watch My Chops
- Wayside
- Weasel Town
- We Bare Bears
- Welcome to the Wayne
- What It's Like Being Alone
- Witchblade
- Wolf
- Wolverine and the X-Men
- The Wrong Coast
- Wyrd Sisters
- X-DuckX
- X-Men
- The X's
- Xcalibur
- Xiaolin Showdown
- Yakkity Yak
- YOLO: Crystal Fantasy
- Young Justice
- Zombie Hotel

=== Original productions ===
- Atomic Forest
- Enter Ice Cream
- 2X2 Music
- Kit Stupid Show
- Pykhchevo
- School 13: Game Vault
- Valera
- Suspicious Owl
- Conjure From Here
- Caution, Earthlings!
- Caution, Cyber-Earthlings!

=== Short series ===
This is a list of short animated series, which aired or airs on 2x2.

- The Adventures Of Jeffrey! (Removed from 2x2, at the request of RKN)
- Angry Kid
- Bernard
- Angus and Cheryl
- Bricks 'N Brats
- Bugged
- Friday Wear
- Futz!
- Happy Tree Friends (Removed from 2x2, at the request of RKN)
- I Am Baby Cakes
- The Imp
- Lamarinatorr
- Lascars
- Lenore, the Cute Little Dead Girl
- Looney Tunes
- Merrie Melodies
- Minuscule
- Molang
- Mr. Freeman
- Muzzy Comes Back
- Muzzy in Gondoland
- Oscar's Oasis
- Pib and Pog
- Popeye the Sailor
- The Professor Brothers
- Pucca
- Robin
- Shaman's Quest
- Shaun the Sheep
- Suckers
- Tom and Jerry
- A Town Called Panic
- Wishfart
- Wallace and Gromit
- Y'All So Stupid

The channel also broadcasts various animated shorts by the studios Soyuzmultfilm, Studio Ekran and Pilot.
