= Stone and Stone =

American comedy twin duo (both born 1983)

- Born: March 22, 1983 (age 43); New York City
- Occupation: Comedy Duo
- Website: https://www.stoneandstonecomedy.com/

Stone and Stone is an American comedy duo consisting of twin brothers, Adam and Todd Stone (born on March 22, 1983).

== Life and career ==
=== Personal life ===
Adam and Todd Stone were born in New York City. They attended Wesleyan University together and graduated in 2005.

=== Career ===
While at Wesleyan University, the brothers developed a variety show combining their individual performance skills into a single act. During their sophomore year, the brothers gave their first performance as Stone and Stone.

==== Online Series ====
Adam and Todd Stone portrayed recurring roles as The Henchman in Penelope Princess of Pets, a comedic online series developed by the comedy duo of Kurt Braunohler and Kristen Schaal, which also includes a theme song written and performed by comedian/musician Reggie Watts. This web series consisted of 3- to 5-minute webisodes for comedy website Super Deluxe. Penelope premiered online in March 2007, with nine webisodes released. It was picked up soon after to be adapted into a television show for United Kingdom broadcaster Channel 4.

Currently as of (2019) the Stones are working on a new web series called “Going Both Ways.“ It has been accepted into and presented at several prominent festivals around the United States.

==== Comedic short films/commercials/television ====
The Stones have made numerous comedic short videos featured on the web. With highlights including work for Comedy Central's Atom TV. They also starred as principals in a national Verizon FiOS commercial.

The Stones have appeared on NBC’s Last Comic Standing, where they reached the semi-final round in Las Vegas.

==== Live performances ====
The Stone twins have performed in many of the largest comedy clubs in the U.S., including Carolines on Broadway, Gotham Comedy Club, The Laugh Factory, New York Friars' Club, Stand-Up NY and the Upright Citizens Brigade Theatre. Each month, the Stones host the long-running live show, Stone and Stone, at the Peoples Improv Theater.

=== Awards and recognition ===
The Stones are both members of the New York Friars' Club. In February 2008, judges Steve Schirripa and Richard Belzer selected Stone and Stone to advance to the Last Comic Standing, Season 6, semi-finals in Las Vegas.
