= Dan McNamara =

American artist and humorist (born 1984)

- Born: August 24, 1984 (age 42)

Comedy career
- Years active: 2006–present
- Medium: Sketch comedy, Television, Web Series,
- Genres: Absurdism, Satire
- Website: danmcnamara.com

Dan McNamara (born August 24, 1984) is an American artist and humorist who works primarily with video and special effects. McNamara's works include the animated web series The Bear, The Cloud, and God, which appeared on Comedy Central, G4 TV, and Channel Frederator. Four of his projects have been screened at the New York Television Festival, including Redeeming Rainbow, featuring performances by Kristen Schaal and Ellie Kemper.

McNamara's first TV Pilot, The Calderons, was released in 2006 and screened as an official selection at that year's New York Television Festival. His second pilot, Redeeming Rainbow, was completed in July 2007. It was one of four finalists in Comedy Central's Test Pilots competition, and like The Calderons it was also named a New York Television Festival finalist. Noted actress and comedian Kristen Schaal has featured roles in both The Calderons and Redeeming Rainbow. Dan also edited and created visual effects for Penelope Princess of Pets, a web series for Super Deluxe and later a special on Channel 4 in London.

In 2008, McNamara created the animated comedy web series Amazing the Lion for the Independent Comedy Network, featuring the voice acting of Kurt Braunohler, Jordan Carlos, and Seth Herzog. 2009 saw Dan return to the New York Television Festival with Lost Cities, a mockumentary-style travel pilot focusing on a semi-fictitious version of Jersey City, New Jersey, where Dan resided in real life.

McNamara created the popular web series The Bear, The Cloud, and God in 2009. Like Amazing the Lion, The Bear, The Cloud, and God is an animated comedy show that stylistically resembles children's television programming. The Bear, The Cloud, and God has been featured on G4 TV's Attack of the Show! and on Comcast On Demand. In 2010, a compilation of episodes of The Bear, The Cloud, and God gave McNamara his fourth New York Television Festival selection in five years.

McNamara was a member of the comedy group The Upset Triangle, which performed semi-regularly at The People's Improv Theater in Chelsea, Manhattan. He currently works as a senior motion graphics artist at Complex on Hot Ones and a variety of other shows.

In 2018, McNamara fundraised and created the web series Wish Weasel and was featured in Tubefilter's Fund This. Wish Weasel takes place in Astoria, Queens. In 2019, McNamara received a grant from the Queens Council Of The Arts to fund a public screening of Wish Weasel at the Museum Of The Moving Image. Wish Weasel was also nominated for the Test Card Pilot Award by the Edinburgh TV Festival for the 2019 New Voice Awards and screened at 23 festivals in 2019.
