= Chris Royal =

Chris(topher) Royal, Chris Royal, or Royle may refer to:

- Christopher Royal, athlete
- Chris Royal (singer)
- Chris Royal (cookbook author)
