= Dirty Dishes =

American rock band

Dirty Dishes is a New York City-based American rock band founded by songwriter/singer/guitarist Jenny Tuite. Dirty Dishes' style is described as heavy-laden hooks blasting headfirst into speaker-shredding fuzz. Sonically the band has been compared to Smashing Pumpkins, My Bloody Valentine, Radiohead, and Sonic Youth.

== History ==
On January 27, 2015, Dirty Dishes released their debut album “Guilty” on Exploding in Sound Records. Recording for the album was split between Los Angeles, CA and Chelsea, MA. The album was engineered by Chris Thompson and recorded in Thompson’s garage. The album was well-received and described as "enduring a waking dream — it’s both a harrowing and totally beautiful experience” by Stereogum. "Dirty Dishes’ composition is refreshing and intense. Guilty is clearly the result of Tuite's significant growth as a songwriter, and is the kind of record that a band can build a following on." The album cover is a photo of a school that expelled Tuite.

On January 28, 2015 the band released the music video for “Thank You Come Again” The video premiered on The A.V Club and was directed by Pat Bishop of the comedy group Women. The video was inspired by Tuite's experience working at grocery store in Silverlake.

On January 29, 2016 the band released the music video for "Guilty." The video premiered on Independent Music News, and was directed by The Current Sea, the creative team of Sarah Zucker and Brian Griffith. The video features an alien figurine taking a miniature fern out for a walk, eventually liberating the fern on a mountain overlooking Los Angeles, with psychedelic analog visuals.

On February 8, 2016 the band released their single "All of Me." The track premiered on Noisey, along with a long string of national U.S. tour dates.

== Discography ==
=== Studio albums ===
- Guilty (2015)

=== EPs ===
- The Most Tarnished Birds (2012)
- Dirty Dishes (2010)

=== Singles ===
- All of Me (2016)
