= Viray =

Viray is a surname. Notable people with the surname include:

- Bianca Viray (born 1983), American mathematician
- Jim Bruce Viray (born 1985), Filipino basketball player
- Jona Viray (born 1989), Filipino singer and actress
- Pat Viray (born 1985), American soccer player
- Primitivo Viray (born 1960), Filipino economist and academic administrator
