= Hot tub (disambiguation) =

A hot tub is a small, manufactured pool or tub filled with hot water and used for relaxation, massage, or hydrotherapy.

Hot tub may also refer to:

- "Hot Tub" (Drawn Together), a 2004 television episode
- "Hot Tub" (Malcolm in the Middle), a 2004 television episode
- "Hot Tub" (Not Going Out), a 2017 television episode
- "The Hot Tub", a 1995 episode of Seinfeld
- Hot Tub with Kurt and Kristen, a weekly comedy variety show
- Hot Tub Time Machine, a 2010 comedy film
