= South Lakes High School =

Coordinates: 38.932°N 77.339°W

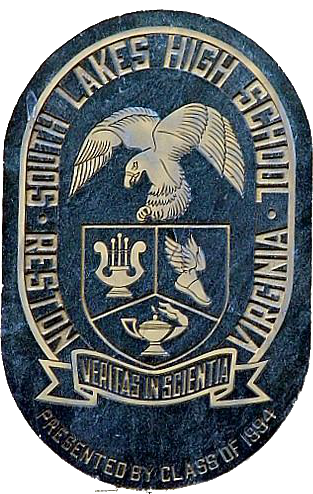

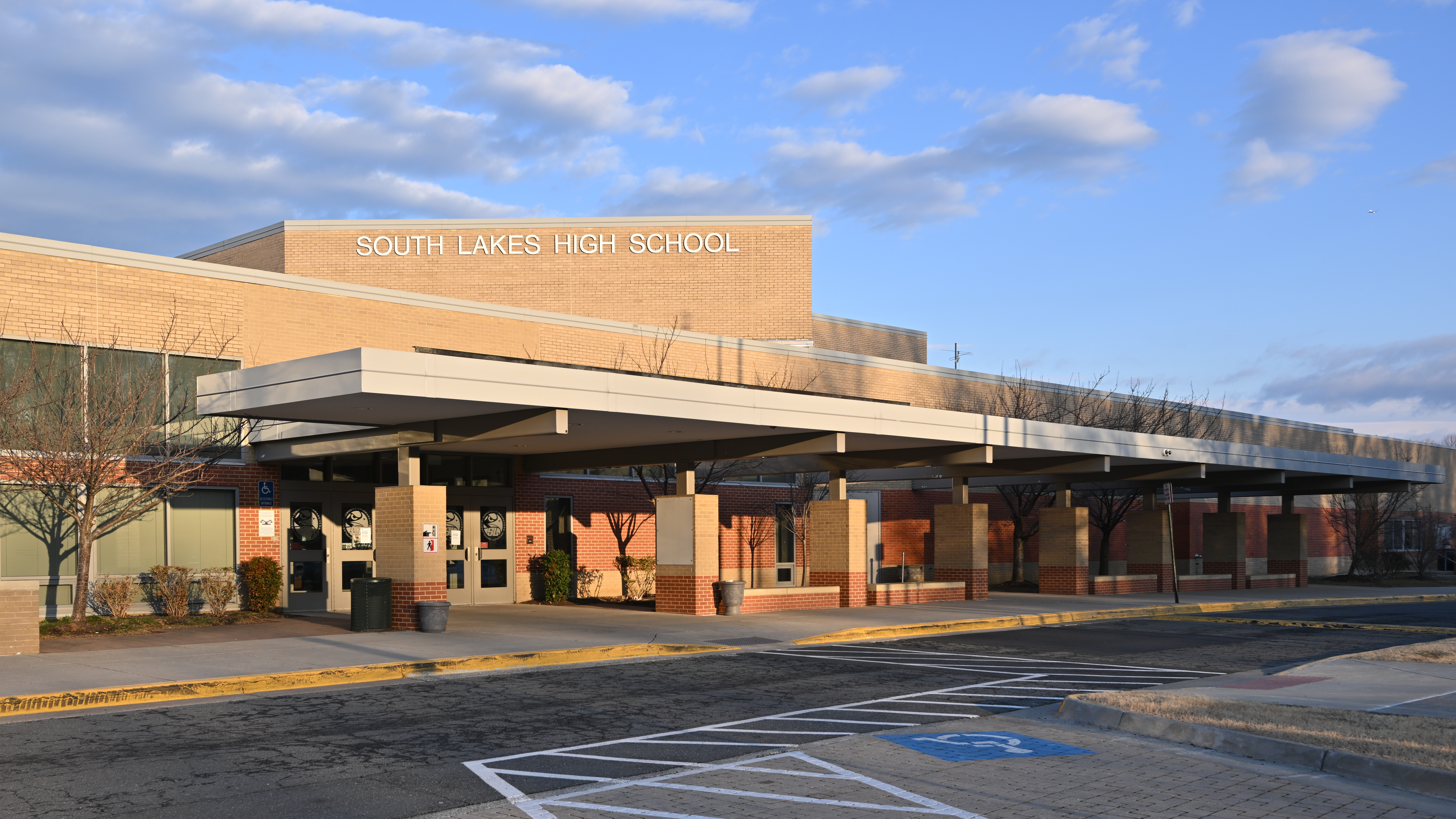

Location
- 11400 South Lakes Drive; Reston, Virginia 20191; United States

Information
- School type: Public high school, secondary school
- Motto: Veritas in Scientia (Truth in Knowledge)
- Founded: 1978; 48 years ago
- School district: Fairfax County Public Schools
- Principal: Carlos Seward
- Staff: 192.31 (on an FTE basis) (2021–22)
- Grades: 9–12
- Gender: Co-Educational
- Enrollment: 2,565 (2021–22)
- Student to teacher ratio: 13.32 (2021–22)
- Colors: Royal Blue; Kelly Green
- Athletics conference: Virginia High School League (VHSL); Concorde District; Northern Region
- Mascot: Seahawk
- Nickname: Seymour
- Feeder schools: Langston Hughes Middle School, Rachel Carson Middle School
- Website: Official website

South Lakes High School is a public high school in Reston, Virginia, United States. The school serves grades 9-12 for the Fairfax County Public Schools.

== History ==
South Lakes High School opened in 1978 with grades 7-10. Students in the first 10th-grade class had attended either Herndon or Oakton High Schools for grade 9. In the 1979-80 school year, the school had grades 7-11. Langston Hughes Intermediate School was supposed to open in the fall of 1980, but there were construction delays. As a result, for the first quarter of the 1980-1981 school year, South Lakes had a split shift so high school (grades 9-12) students attended in the morning and intermediate school (grades 7-8) students attended in the afternoon. Langston Hughes opened in time for 2nd quarter. South Lakes' first graduating class was the class of 1981 (who attended the school for three years).

South Lakes underwent a $55 million renovation from winter 2006 through August 2008. The renovation was completed in time for the 2008–2009 school year. A second renovation, completed in the winter of 2018, gave the school a new wing.

== Athletics ==
South Lakes High School, located in Reston, Virginia, has tradition of athletic excellence across various sports. Competing in the Virginia High School League (VHSL) Class 6 and as a member of the Concorde District, the Seahawks have achieved success at the district, regional, and state levels.

=== Boys' Basketball ===
The South Lakes boys' basketball team has emerged as a powerhouse in recent years. In 2024, the Seahawks clinched their first-ever VHSL Class 6 state championship. They followed this achievement by securing back-to-back state titles in 2025, defeating C.G. Woodson High School 68–60 in the final. Senior forward Jordan Scott, a Michigan State University signee, led the team with 32 points, nine rebounds, five blocks, and three assists in the championship game. Junior Merrick Rillstone added 21 points, including 19 in the second half.

In addition to their state success, South Lakes won their fourth consecutive 6D North Region title in 2025, marking the program's 10th regional championship.

=== Track and Field ===
South Lakes has a storied history in track and field. In 2001 future Olympian Alan Webb set the record for the fastest mile ever run by an American high schooler, with a time of 3:53.43, which as of 2025 still stands. In 2025, the boys' team captured the 6D North Region championship with a commanding performance, amassing 119 points to outpace the runner-up, Wakefield High School, which scored 59 points.

At the state level, the boys' team narrowly missed the VHSL Class 6 indoor track and field title in 2025, finishing just half a point behind West Springfield High School.

=== Cheerleading ===
The South Lakes cheerleading squad has elevated its profile by competing at regional and national levels. Known for their dynamic routines and school spirit, the team has become a central fixture at athletic events and competitions.

=== Cross Country ===
The Seahawks' cross country teams have consistently performed well in invitational meets. Notably, the freshmen girls' team led the way at the Oatlands Invitational, securing first place in the JV Underclassman Girls division.

=== Baseball ===
The South Lakes High School baseball program has experienced significant growth and success in recent years. Competing in the Virginia High School League (VHSL) Class 6 and as a member of the Concorde District, the Seahawks have become a formidable presence in regional and state competitions.

In 2024, the Seahawks clinched their first-ever Northern Region championship, marking a historic achievement for the program. This victory propelled them into the VHSL Class 6 state tournament, where they advanced to the championship game after a dramatic 4–3 semifinal win over Western Branch High School. In the final, South Lakes faced McLean High School but fell short, concluding the season as state runners-up.

The 2024 season was notable not only for team achievements but also for individual performances. Senior third baseman Kameron Johnson made a significant impact by hitting a two-run homer in the state championship game. Additionally, catcher Robbie Reddington was recognized for his sportsmanship during the regional tournament.

In the 2024–25 season, the Seahawks continued to demonstrate competitiveness, finishing with an overall record of 7–12 and a regional record of 4–5. The team secured a notable 11–5 victory over Centreville High School on May 6, 2025.

The program has also produced players who advanced to professional baseball. Notably, Wyatt Toregas played in Major League Baseball from 2009 to 2011.

=== Other Sports ===
South Lakes High School offers a comprehensive athletic program, including football, soccer, swimming, tennis, wrestling, volleyball, baseball, softball, lacrosse, and field hockey. The school continues to foster athletic development and competition across all these disciplines.

== Notable people ==
- Gordon Bellamy, video game executive, former executive director of the International Game Developers Association
- Ethan T. Berlin, writer and comedian, co-creator of the comedy game show Bunk
- Maame Biney, short track speed skater who competed in the 2018 Winter Olympics
- Big Pooh, rapper, half of hip-hop duo Little Brother
- Benny Blanco, rapper, songwriter, producer
- TJ Bush, professional soccer player in the USL League One
- David M. Ewalt, author and journalist
- Kimberly Fiorello, member of the Connecticut House of Representatives from the 149th District
- Nabra Hassanen, murdered Muslim student
- Grant Hill, NBA professional basketball player
- Michael Jackson, NBA professional basketball player
- Deon King, former NFL player
- Derek Lee, former Major League Baseball player
- Thomas Mayo, NFL wide receiver
- Karen Reyes, professional soccer player, on the El Salvador women's national team
- Christopher Royal, former Arena Football League player
- Walter Shaub, director of U.S. Office of Government Ethics from 2013 to 2017
- Michael Shabaz, professional tennis player
- Mikie Sherrill, Governor of New Jersey
- Andrew Siciliano, sports announcer for the Los Angeles Rams
- Wes Suter, gymnast who competed in the 1988 Summer Olympics
- Eddie Timanus, 5-Time Jeopardy! champion; USA Today sportswriter
- Wyatt Toregas, former Major League Baseball player
- Julian Vaughn, former professional basketball player
- Pat Viray, former professional soccer player
- Alan Webb, American mile record-holder and Olympic runner
- Christy Winters-Scott, NBC basketball announcer, University of Maryland women's basketball player, current head girls basketball coach at South Lakes
