= Penelope Princess of Pets =

Penelope: Princess of Pets is a comedy series by comedy duo Kurt Braunohler and Kristen Schaal, in which Schaal stars as Penelope, a woman who can talk with animals. On a mission to save the world by killing a legislator named Stone before it's too late, Penelope is accompanied on her quest by her pet bird Ruby, and orphan friend Kyle (played by Braunohler). The theme song is written and performed by comedian/musician Reggie Watts. Originally a web series of 3- to 5-minute webisodes edited by Dan McNamara for comedy website Super Deluxe, Penelope premiered online in March 2007, with nine webisodes released, before the site was shut down in December 2008. It was picked up soon after to be adapted into a television show for the United Kingdom broadcaster Channel 4.

Produced by Avalon Television and billed as a "one-off special", the half-hour television format backdoor pilot was first broadcast on Comedy Lab on 21 April 2010. Although including various elements and bits from the original web series, the television show has a number of key differences, including altered character back-stories. Whereas the web series title sequence states that Penelope has 3759 hours to save the world, the title sequence for the television show states that Penelope has 3769 hours. The television show features a legislator named Stone like in the web series, but since the TV show is set in the UK rather than the United States, Stone is a Member of Parliament (MP) rather than a senator. While Senator Stone is played by Ali Reza Farahnakian in the web series, in the television show MP Thomas Stone is played by Julian Barratt of The Mighty Boosh. The henchmen played by twin comedians Todd and Adam Stone in the web series are replaced by MP Stone's adopted sons, played by twin actors Sam and Matt Kennard. These secondary characters play a more prominent role in the television series, with MP Stone given main billing in the title sequence.
