= Christy Winters-Scott =

American basketball broadcaster

Christy Winters Scott
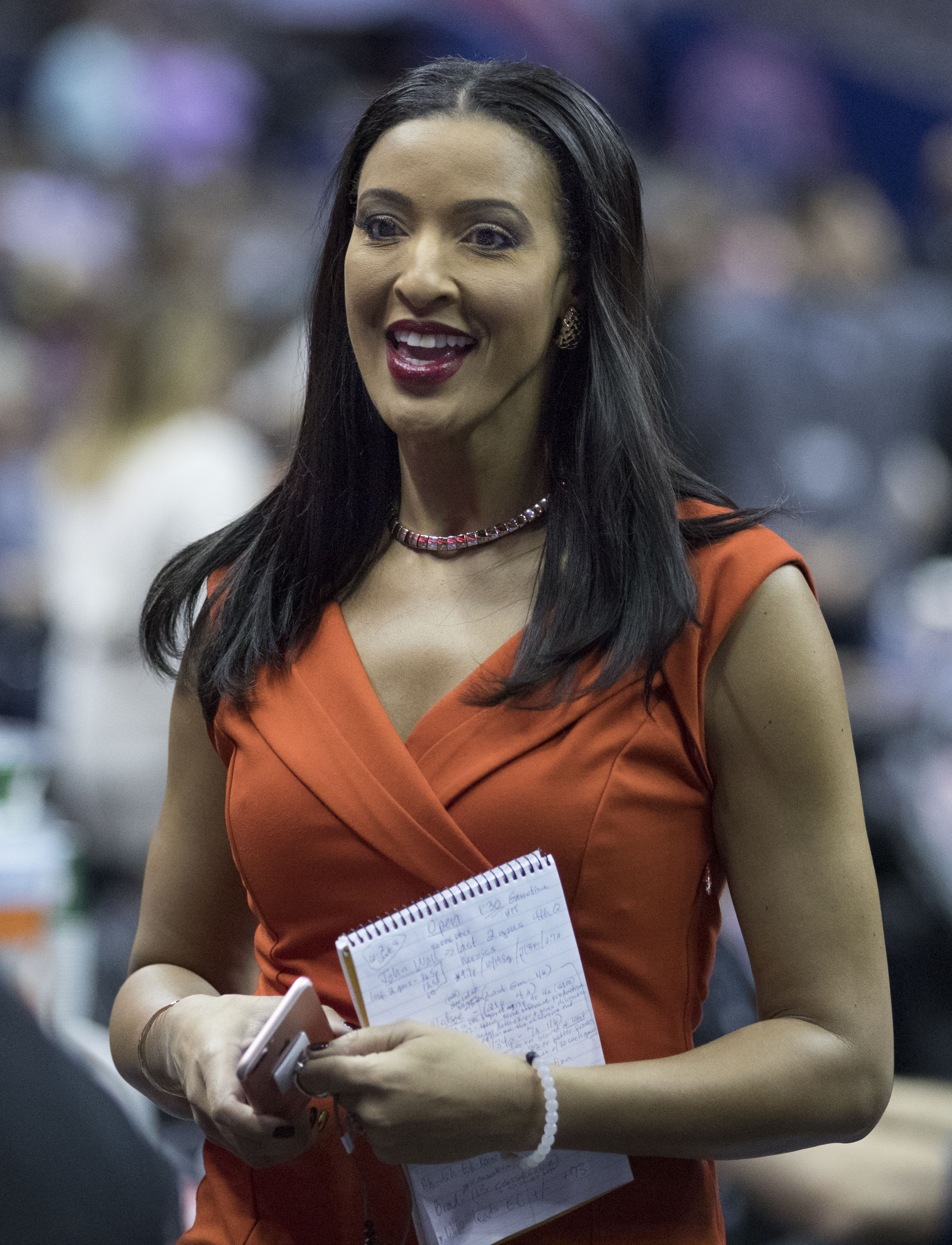

Personal information
- Born: Reston, Virginia, U.S.

Career information
- High school: South Lakes (Reston, Virginia)
- College: Maryland (1986–1990)
- Coaching career: 1993–2022

Career history

Coaching
- 1993–1997: George Mason (Assistant)
- 1997–2002: Maryland (Assistant)
- 2004–2005: Georgetown (Assistant)
- 2005–2022: South Lakes High School

Career highlights
- First Team All-ACC (1989 and 1990); ACC ALL TOURNAMENT TEAM 1988, 1989, 1990.

Christy Winters Scott is a basketball color analyst for college basketball games for ESPN, FSN, The Big Ten Network (BTN), Monumental Sports Network, and Raycom Sports. She has been the lead analyst for BTN Women's Basketball since 2016. She previously was an analyst for ACC Women's games, the ACC Women's Basketball Tournament, and SEC games, and she has been working as an analyst for the NCAA women's basketball tournament since 2012. She also calls WNBA games for the Washington Mystics. She has been the host of the NBA's Washington Wizards pre-game and post-game shows on NBC Sports Washington since 2012, and she also has served as an NBA Analyst for the Wizards for NBCSW.

== Early life ==
Christy Winters-Scott was born in Reston, Virginia and played high school basketball at South Lakes High School. Winters-Scott was the greatest female player to play at South Lakes. Winters-Scott led the Seahawks to a 29–0 record, and she helped them to win the 1986 Virginia AAA State Title during her senior season. Winters-Scott was named DC Metro Area All-Met player of the year by The Washington Post, The Washington Times, and The Fairfax Journal, while averaging 23 points, 14 rebounds, and six blocks per game. Winters-Scott scored 1,785 points, 1,075 rebounds, and 492 blocks for her high school career. Winters-Scott, then known as Christy Winters, eventually elected into the South Lakes Athletics Hall of Fame alongside Grant Hill, who said, "it feels good to be recognized as the male Christy Winters" during his acceptance speech.

== Collegiate and professional career ==
Winters-Scott earned a full scholarship to play collegiate basketball at the University of Maryland from 1986 to 1990. Winters-Scott recorded 1,679 points (second in Maryland history), 723 rebounds (fourth in Maryland history), and played 123 career games (first in school history). Winters is one of only two players to score more than 700 field goals (703) at Maryland. Winters also ranks in the all-time top 10 at Maryland in games started (fourth with 100), blocked shots (fifth with 91) and field goal percentage (eighth with .537).

Winters-Scott helped Maryland to win its eighth ACC Championship in 1989, and she led the team to its third Final Four appearance. Winters-Scott was named First Team All ACC and Kodak All-East Region, while leading the Terps with 533 points as a senior.

Winters-Scott spent a year playing in Pistoia, Italy and another two years in Fribourg, Switzerland, after graduating. She averaged 37 points and 12 rebounds per game, and she had a career high of 48 points, while competing for the Euro Cup, in her final professional season in Switzerland.

== Broadcasting and coaching ==
Winters-Scott decided to change her focus to coaching after her playing career. She became an assistant coach for George Mason University from 1993 to 1997, Maryland from 1997 to 2002, and Georgetown University from 2004 to 2005. Winters-Scott left Georgetown in 2005, in order to accept the head coaching position for her alma mater, South Lakes High School. The South Lakes team had a record of 0–21 in the year before her arrival. She turned around the program by 2009. The team's record was 19–4, and she earned the Liberty District Coach of the Year Award. The South Lakes team qualified for the Virginia State Tournament in 2013 with a 24–6 record. It was the school's first trip to the state tournament since Winters-Scott won the state championship as a player in 1986. She coached the team through the 2021-2022 season.

Winters-Scott earned the "Women In Sports" Coach of the Year Award in 2013. She was recognized as the top female coach, in any sport, in Fairfax County, Virginia. Winters-Scott began to broadcast and produce shows for the Roundball Report, on CTV76 in Maryland, during her coaching tenure at South Lakes.

The Roundball Report shows quickly caught the attention of the DC broadcasting market. Winters-Scott became the new Wizards studio host in 2012, and she called collegiate (men's and women's) basketball on Comcast SportsNet.

Today, Winters-Scott lives with her husband, Jerome Scott, and three children, in Reston, Virginia. Winters-Scott broadcasts 20 to 30 college games a year, all Mystics TV games, and Wizards games. Winters-Scott also holds a resume of awards: ACC 50th Anniversary Team, South Lakes Athletic Hall of Fame, University of Maryland Hall of Fame, ACC Women's Basketball Legend, Shirley Povich Center for Sports Journalism, and Distinguished Terrapin Award. She was most recently recognized by ESSENCE Magazine as one of the top 12 African American female sports reporters in the country.
