= The Super Serious Show =

- Genre: Comedy, Variety, Improv
- Created by: CleftClips

Production
- Producer: CleftClips
- Production locations: Los Angeles, United States

Related
- Hot Tub Variety Show

The Super Serious Show is a live comedy show that mixes stand-up, sketch, musical comedy and videos from a blend of up-and-coming performers and established comedians. Embracing a wide variety of non-polished acts and spontaneity, The Super Serious Show combines elements of traditional club comedy and alternative comedy. The show is often a platform for well-known comics to test new material and "riff," or perform without any planned content. The monthly Los Angeles event features a D.J., food trucks, free food and wine, along with surprise appearances from special guests. In addition to the L.A. installment, the show tours the comedy festival circuit and has appeared at the Edinburgh Festival Fringe, Riot L.A., and South by Southwest in conjunction with Funny or Die and SoundCloud. Notable past performers include Daniel Tosh, Sarah Silverman, "Weird Al" Yankovic, Amy Schumer, Aisha Tyler, Aziz Ansari, Chris Kattan, T.J. Miller, Reggie Watts, Margaret Cho, Demetri Martin, Kristen Schaal, and John Hodgman.
