= Magical Pet =

- China, IL episode
- Episode no.: Season 3 Episode 10
- Directed by: Griffith Kimmins
- Written by: Brad Neely
- Production code: 308
- Original air date: June 14, 2015
- Running time: 44 minutes

Guest appearances
- Cat Power as Kei-ko; Evan Peters as Clint; Rosa Salazar as Barb

Episode chronology
← Previous "Gummie World"	Next → —

"Magical Pet" (also known as "China, IL: The Musical") is the tenth and final episode of the third and final season of the program China, IL. The 44-minute-long episode features ten songs written and arranged by creator Brad Neely. Several producers wrote the episode, including executive producer Daniel Weidenfeld. In it, Leonard Cakes acquires Kei-ko, a talking gorilla, to appease his son's demands for a magical pet. Baby Cakes is more amused by Frank, whose body becomes entirely covered in hair after failing to read the directions of a hair growth stimulant. Frank's brother Steve competes with Pony over who is less shallow romantically.

"Magical Pet" originally aired on June 14, 2015, on Adult Swim. Atlanta-based musician Cat Power provided the voice of Kei-ko, while actors Evan Peters and Rosa Salazar lent the voices of Pony and Steve's dates. The episode was seen by approximately 1.1 million viewers on its first air date. Writers of music- and entertainment-related publications gave its music and themes praise.

== Plot ==
Leonard Cakes gives in to his son Baby Cakes' demands for a "magical pet" and runs to a pet adoption center. Baby Cakes complains there that the pets are unremarkable. Leonard asks him to grow up, putting Baby Cakes in a lethargic state. Frank Smith wants to date his neighbor Cindy, but she refuses to date bald men. He sets out to Chinatown in search of a hair growth stimulant. Frank buys some pills, which cause hair to grow rapidly all over his body. Pony and Steve attempt to prove to one another that appearance is not their primary motivation in starting relationship. Pony sets up a date with Clint, a food blogger, and Steve asks out Barb, a bartender. Steve and Pony separately discover that their dates are a satyr and a cyclops, respectively. Leonard enters the "Fucking with Animals" department on the campus of University of China, Illinois, where he witness the Dean's plans to decompose caged animals to petroleum. Kei-ko, a gorilla with a speech-generating device, sings a swan song. Leonard bargains with the Dean to give the gorilla to his son, but Baby Cakes refuses to take Kei-ko, complaining that she is not really magical.

Frank tries shaving his body, but the hair grows back, sending him to the woods in a panic. Leonard encounters Frank there and asks him to act as Baby Cakes' new pet, bringing Baby Cakes back to high spirits. Pony and Steve reluctantly reveal each other's dates, and the two agree to double date to avoid being accused of being shallow. In Baby Cakes' room, Kei-ko regrets never finding another gorilla to mate with. Frank assures her that there are plenty of gorillas in the wild and promises to release her by some means. Baby Cakes barges in and sends Kei-ko back to the Dean, but when he returns, Frank's stimulant has worn off, making Baby Cakes depressed again. Frank performs a song stressing the "magic" of friendship over material things, cheering Baby Cakes up slightly. Frank warns that they need to rescue Kei-ko. At the Dean's department, Frank wins the gorilla back through bribery, and Frank, Baby Cakes, and Leonard release Kei-ko to the wild. Pony and Steve meet at a restaurant, where their dates reveal themselves as exes. Clint and Barb get physical and partially destroy the restaurant. Steve and Pony laugh over the situation as they discuss future dates. The episode ends with a still-hairy Frank returning home, where his neighbor Cindy sees him while he's trying to enter his apartment. As the hair falls off his body, Frank confronts Cindy over her refusal to date and have sex with him due to superficial reasons. Frank then triumphantly states that he is magical and enters his apartment free of all of his unwanted hair.

== Production ==
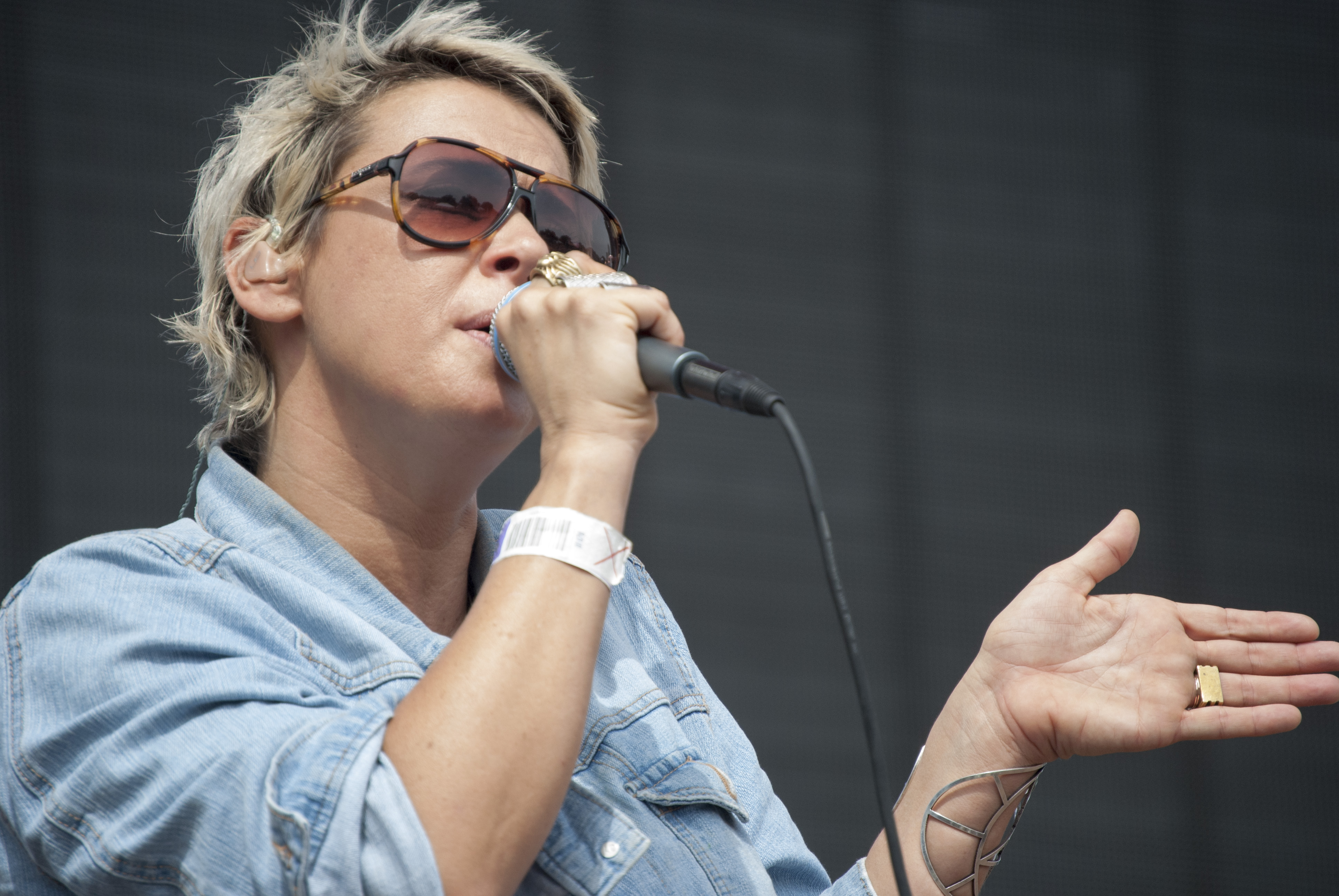
Cat Power (pictured) provided the synthesized voice of Kei-ko.

All ten of the songs in "Magical Pet" were written by Brad Neely, who created China, IL. Program executive producer Daniel Weidenfeld wrote the episode with Rebecca Addelman, L. E. Correia, Greta Gerwig, Chris Goodwin, Kyle McCulloch, and Mehar Sethi. It was the eighth episode produced of the program's third season. The episode has a running time of 44 minutes, double that of a typical episode. The 22-minute limit constantly forced the crew to remove 10 minutes of material from their scripts. They generated enough material for the episode to attempt to push the limit. Adult Swim approved this decision; if not, the crew would have scrapped its musical element. According to Weidenfeld, it was the "most fun ever" to write. The voices of Pony and Steve's love interests were supplied by actors Evan Peters and Rosa Salazar. Weidenfeld and Neely were nervous to approach Peters, but the actor was enthusiastic to finally work in voice acting.

Atlanta-based musician Chan Marshall, stage name Cat Power, performed three of the songs as the voice of Kei-ko's speaking device. The 1995 film Congo served as inspiration for Kei-ko's species and ability to speak. Weidenfeld defined the themes explored in Marshall's songs as "the reason" he and the production crew produce animation. A major theme in those same compositions, Neely said, was the "chain of misery" involved in "all facets" the 21st century. According to the creator, the episode's central themes consisted of friendship and assigning importance and meaning to things relative to a person's life. Neely himself provided the voice of Baby Cakes, Frank, and Steve. The aforementioned character performs several jazz duets with Pony, whose voice was lent by Greta Gerwig. For one of Frank's songs, Neely sought inspiration from the music video for "Stayin' Alive" by the Bee Gees; Baby Cakes' songs reference Disney animated classics.

== Reception ==
Adult Swim originally aired "Magical Pet" on June 14, 2015. This airing received a Nielsen rating of 0.5 for adults aged 18 to 49, in that 0.5 percent of all persons in that age range with a television set viewed the episode. Ranked by this measurement, the episode was the 13th most-watched program on cable television for that date. For households with two or more persons, approximately 1.1 million viewers saw the episode. Liz Ohanesian of Paste called Cat Power's first song the most poignant part of the episode, writing that the burden of self-awareness faced by Marshall's character clarifies the themes of the episode and China, IL altogether. The songs according to Ohanesian heightened the episode's comedy, as did Hulk Hogan's performance as the Dean. James Grebey of Spin considered Marshall's employment on the episode unsurprising, given the network's association with alternative and independent music. The episode serves as China, IL's final episode. Neely announced that Adult Swim passed on a fourth season renewal. He has continued working for the network with a new program, Brad Neely's Harg Nallin' Sclopio Peepio.
