= Ethan T. Berlin =

American screenwriter

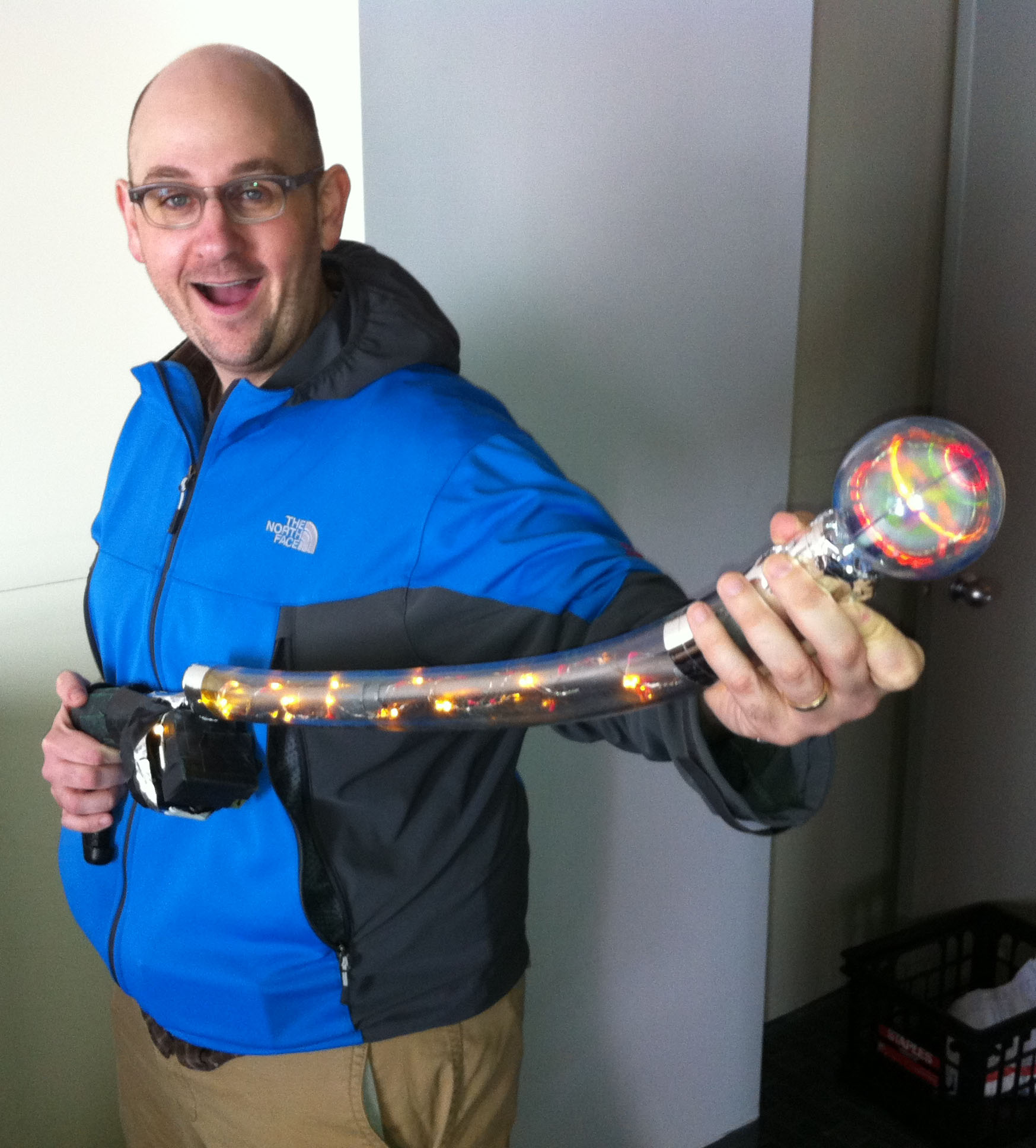
- Occupations: Writer, producer, comedian, actor, cartoonist
- Television: Bunk
- Website: www.ethanberlin.com

Ethan T. Berlin is a writer, television producer, comedian, actor, and cartoonist in the United States. He is a co-creator of IFC's comedy game show Bunk and the creator of the web comic Murray the Nut. Berlin's first book, The Hugely-Wugely Spider was published in 2018. He co-wrote on the comedy television special Night of Too Many Stars which was nominated for an Emmy award in 2013.

== Early life and education ==
Berlin is from Reston, Virginia. He attended South Lakes High School and the Burren College of Art in Ballyvaughn, County Clare, Ireland.

== Career ==
=== Television ===
Berlin's first major writing job was on the Comedy Central puppet prank show, Crank Yankers in 2004. Subsequent writing credits included TBS’s “Lopez Tonight,” HBO’s “Da Ali G Show,” FOX’s "Talkshow with Spike Feresten,” and HBO’s "Night of Too Many Stars: America Comes Together for Autism Programs."

He has executive produced various series, including, FX’s "Totally Biased with W. Kamau Bell,” CNBC’s "The Filthy Rich Guide,” and TruTV’s “Paid off with Michael Torpey". In 2006, Berlin created and executive produced the animated MTV pilot, All-Star American Destiny Trek, a parody of the competition television series genre, which starred Will Arnett and Tom Kenney. In 2012, Berlin co-created, executive produced and starred in the parody game show Bunk on the IFC network.

=== Other media ===
Berlin created the daily web comic series Murray the Nut which ran from 2008 to 2017. In 2018 he wrote The Hugely-Wugely Spider, a children's book. His next book I’m Not A Dog Toy was published in March 2021. He currently stars as the robot L.I.S.A. on the podcast The Big Fib. Berlin teaches classes in comedy writing at various institutions including New York University and SUNY Stonybrook.
