= Bronwyn Lundberg =

American painter

Bronwyn Lundberg is an American digital artist and painter specializing in graphic art. She is notable for her painting of the Lesbian Last Supper of Sandra Bernhard, Ellen DeGeneres, Melissa Etheridge, k.d. lang, Jane Lynch, Rachel Maddow, Heather Matarazzo, Kate Moennig, Rosie O'Donnell, Linda Perry, Portia de Rossi, Wanda Sykes, and Lily Tomlin. Lundberg also collaborates with Sarah Zucker as the Pop Art team YoMeryl. She recently created a mural for a parking lot in the city of West Hollywood.
