= The Harper House =

2021 American adult animated sitcom

- Promotional poster
- Genre: Sitcom
- Created by: Brad Neely
- Written by: Brad Neely
- Starring: Rhea Seehorn; Jason Lee; Ryan Flynn; Tatiana Maslany
- Composers: John Enroth; Albert Fox
- Country of origin: United States
- Original language: English
- No. of seasons: 1
- No. of episodes: 10

Production
- Executive producers: Brad Neely; Katie Krentz; Chris Prynoski; Shannon Prynoski; Ben Kalina
- Producer: Laura Allen
- Editor: Dave Woody
- Running time: 23–24 minutes
- Production companies: Neely Comics; 219 Productions; Titmouse, Inc.; CBS Eye Animation Productions; CBS Studios

Original release
- Network: Paramount+
- Release: September 16 – November 4, 2021

The Harper House is an American adult animated sitcom created by Brad Neely for Paramount+ and starring Rhea Seehorn, Jason Lee, Ryan Flynn, and Tatiana Maslany. The ten-episode series premiered on September 16, 2021.

A week after the release of the final episode, Neely announced that the series had been canceled after one season, and it was quietly removed from the service in late January 2023.

== Premise ==
The series follows the Harpers and focuses on the matriarch and bread-winner Debbie Harper as she is forced to move her family to the poor side of River Creek, Arkansas. Despite their less than ideal living conditions in an old dilapidated house, Debbie does everything she can to reclaim their lost status.

== Cast and characters ==
- Rhea Seehorn as Debbie Harper, working mother
- Jason Lee as Freddie Harper, stay-at-home father
- Tatiana Maslany as Ollie Harper, 11-year-old daughter and Todd's twin
- Ryan Flynn as Todd Harper, 11-year-old son and Ollie's twin
- Gabourey Sidibe as Shauna Bradley, classmate of Ollie and Ryan
- Gary Anthony Williams as Gbenge Bradley, bookshop co-owner and Shauna's father
- Nyima Funk as Katrina Bradley, bookshop co-owner and Shauna's mother
- VyVy Nguyen as Gwen Dang, JimJoe's mother
- Lance Krall as JimJoe Dang, classmate of Ollie and Ryan
- Roberta Colindrez as Tonya Acosta, Debbie's friend who works as a veterinarian
- Tessa Skara as Brenna, Debbie's obnoxious younger sister
- John "Spud" McConnell as Daddie Dan, Debbie's disapproving but loving father
- Chris Diamantopoulos as Dr. Morocco, school principal
- Joanna Hausmann as Ms. Gonzalez, new teacher
- Kelley Frakes, the mayor of River Creek who despises the ethnic community and lower class
- Johnny Frakes, Kelley's son who is the owner of the gated community and has a obsession with Debbie since high school

== Episodes ==
All episodes were written by Brad Neely.

No.	Title	Directed by	Original release date
1	"The Harper House"	Scott Bern	September 16, 2021
The Harpers move into the old Harper House "temporarily" on the poor north side of River Creek while their house in the south gated community is getting renovated. In actuality, Debbie, the matriarch, lost her job at the factory after it was outsourced, they had to sell their house, and now has to work for her father at an awning store. Debbie tries to pitch her new idea for an adjustable awning to her father, Daddie Dan, but he turns it down and informs her that her family is not allowed back at the country club to watch Wrestlmonium. To hide this from their kids, Todd and Ollie, Debbie and her husband Freddie decide to watch Wrestlmonium at home with their new neighbors. Debbie steals the cable, but causes a blackout, leaving everyone frustrated. Debbie finally tells the kids the truth and while upset, they ultimately make up by play wrestling each other.
2	"Conflicting Parenting Books"	Chuck Sheetz	September 16, 2021
When Todd and Ollie return from school with ticks, Debbie tries to use her invention to eradicate them, only to cause damage. The kids' teacher, Ms. Gonzalez, asks Debbie and Freddie about their parenting. Debbie prefers pushing the kids, while Freddie coddles them, leading to the two deciding to challenge each other's beliefs. Meanwhile, Ollie hangs onto a tick and lets it suck her blood; causing her to get woozy. The family take part in the school's leaf collecting competition where the Harpers challenge the other parents' views in child raising. Eventually, Debbie and Freddie realize that both their ways are too radical, but they even each other out, and make up. Todd wins the competition, via cheating, before gloating to his classmates. As the Harpers go to get their reward of ice cream, Ollie's tick explodes.
3	"The Perfect Gift/Marg Truck"	Liza Singer	September 16, 2021
With Debbie's birthday coming up, Freddie decides to get her some sweatpants she briefly admired. However, another woman buys them and he meets with her husband, a dentist, to subtly have them get rid of them. They end up divorcing, so Freddie poses as a counselor and manages to get the pants back. Todd and Ollie are lackadaisical about getting a gift, but change their minds upon seeing that Debbie holds everything they make dear to her. Meanwhile, Tonya and Debbie decide to make a margarita truck to earn more money. Due to the expense, they use cheap Canadian tequila which gives everyone, including Debbie, diarrhea. They outrun the police, due to not having a license, and lose the truck and money. Debbie returns home and poops her pants, but Ollie gives her diarrhea medicine and fish sticks; exactly what she wanted.
4	"That Old House/Friend Stacking"	Scott Bern	September 23, 2021
Todd misses the old house and sees his idol Johnny Frakes trying and failing to sell it, much to his pleasure. Ollie arrives and informs him that Johnny use to date Debbie and realize that he is obsessed with the house, too. They confront him and agree to have closure by writing a letter to a potential buyer. Debbie and Freddie meet the Parkers and befriend them, only to learn that they are "friend stackers", people who only hang in groups. Freddie makes up a story about another family so they can meet. When his lie unravels, Debbie angrily confronts them. To their surprise, the Parkers are more upset about being lied to and break up with them. The Harpers all meet at the house so they can move on. The Parkers are revealed to be the buyers and rip up Todd's letter, causing Johnny to still be obsessed with Debbie.
5	"Baby Talk/Coupon Kid"	Chuck Sheetz	September 30, 2021
Debbie attends a convention to sell her solar following awnings. Her sister Brenna tells her that men will not listen to her unless she utilizes baby talk. She reluctantly does so, but soon finds it humiliating. She ceases, resulting in the buyers to stop listening and losing interest. Brenna tells her that her ideas are good, but that she should let Daddie Dan do the selling. Debbie tries to sell to Shirley Temple, who faked her death, but she dislikes her pitching style. Freddie gets scammed by Shauna with fake coupons. Not wanting to be seen as racist, he finally confronts her and they decide to bet on a soccer game, which Freddie ends up losing. He confronts her father, Gbenga about it and he too realizes that his daughter scammed him as well and was running the Irish Heritage to earn money by fooling the white community. They both end up admiring her scamming abilities with Freddie feeling validated with having a black friend.
6	"Everyone in Town Must Eat a Piece of Barack Obama Before Midnight or the World Ends"	Sarah Seember Huisken	October 7, 2021
Ollie is informed by a crone psychic that everyone in River Creek needs to eat a piece of Barack Obama within 24 hours or the world will end. Everyone, except Debbie and Todd, fall for this with Mayor Kelley Frakes supporting it so that she can wear out the vote on fracking the community. Brenna helps spread the word and soon they get the support of Obama himself who manages to convince everyone to drink his exfoliates. Everyone drinks the Obama filled water and Debbie and Todd reluctantly do so as well. Ollie believes she has made her point while Kelley believes she has won. Obama reveals to Debbie and Todd that he was going along with the hoax so that he could distract Kelley by buying all the companies who would have supported fracking. Debbie worries about Ollie's gullibility, but she quickly informs herself on carbon emissions.
7	"Marshmallow Tests"	Scott Bern	October 14, 2021
Freddie sees that one of his ideas, which Debbie said was dumb, has been made. They collaborate on a new idea: a cough protecting mask with Debbie going "all in". She becomes obsessed to the point that she refuses to do any testing and rushes it out to market while also "firing" Freddie. Meanwhile, Todd tries to cash in his Toys or Bust gift cards, but all the stores shut down. After a failed excursion, Debbie gets on the phone with the former CEO and demands that he buy the toy for Todd. Ollie feels stupid after Todd insulted her the whole time and Debbie realizes she was wrong about Freddie after seeing that the mask has a flaw and faces legal action. The Harpers make up at the ice cream store and buy the masks back from the public. The Halloween store, ironically buys Debbie's masks and perfect it after performing tests.
8	"Home Alone on the 4th of July"	Chuck Sheetz	October 21, 2021
The Harpers prepare to go to the 4th of July celebration, but discover too late that Debbie is banned after last year's event. Forced to stay at Daddie Dan's house, she sees that burglars are breaking in and traps the house. At the celebration, Todd reunites with his friends, who turn out to be jerks, and they drug Freddie who begins to have fun, but hallucinate. Ollie comes back to see what Debbie is up to and they both learn that the burglars were hired by Kelley to rob the houses, so that everyone can buy her new security system. Debbie plans to expose her, but she offers to keep quiet to be let in the festivities. However, Freddie makes a fool of himself and the Harpers are banned for life anyway. On the drive home, the kids' principal Dr. Morocco, has them all conclude what they learned that day and make peace, while he realizes where his drugs went.
9	"Destination Funeral/Making the Lie Real"	Sarah Seember Huisken	October 28, 2021
Debbie is convinced to go on a road trip with Daddie Dan and Brenna as part of a ritual they perform for Mama, they have to go to her hometown to eat an entire barbeque chicken and huckleberry pie while washing it down with a gallon of milk and go to her grave to say there views of her. She soon realizes that Brenna and Daddie Dan are not as committed to it as she had thought. At the funeral, Debbie breaks down about the terrible things Mama had done and the entire family admits the same thing. Daddie Dan admits that he gravitated towards Brenna because she was like Mama and they and Brenna make up, Debbie then realized that the ritual was actually created just so Mama could still be fit (even in death). Freddie tries to impress Gbenga and a critic by claiming he read a book called The Killing Bush. He finds the author and teams up with Tonya to get what the book means. Tonya has sex with him to get the answer and he dies. Freddie tells the critic what the book means and he dies too feeling satisfied. While Freddie and Tonya still do not like each other, they understand one another better.
10	"Bad Help"	Scott Bern	November 4, 2021
To get out of paying taxes, Freddie looks up to see if the Harper House is a historical site. It is, but he and Debbie discover that it belonged to a racist relative who hid a giant KKK statue that is standing on load bearing pillars. Freddie tries to cover it while Debbie removes the statue. Meanwhile, Ollie offers bad help to Todd for his project, unaware of the consequences of her actions. As they take a field trip through the neighborhood along with Mayor Frakes, Debbie accidentally removes the cover and everyone sees the statue while Kelley calls a limo like it was nothing. Freddie announces that he will burn the house, but the Bradleys and Dangs tell him that it is an empty gesture, which Ollie realizes as well, and tell him to just be him. Not realizing that the statue is made of diamonds to pay their taxes, Debbie blows it up where the wind blows the remains to the south side (who just shrugs it off). While the neighbors are slightly upset, the Harpers agree to just continue living life to the best of their ability.

== Production ==
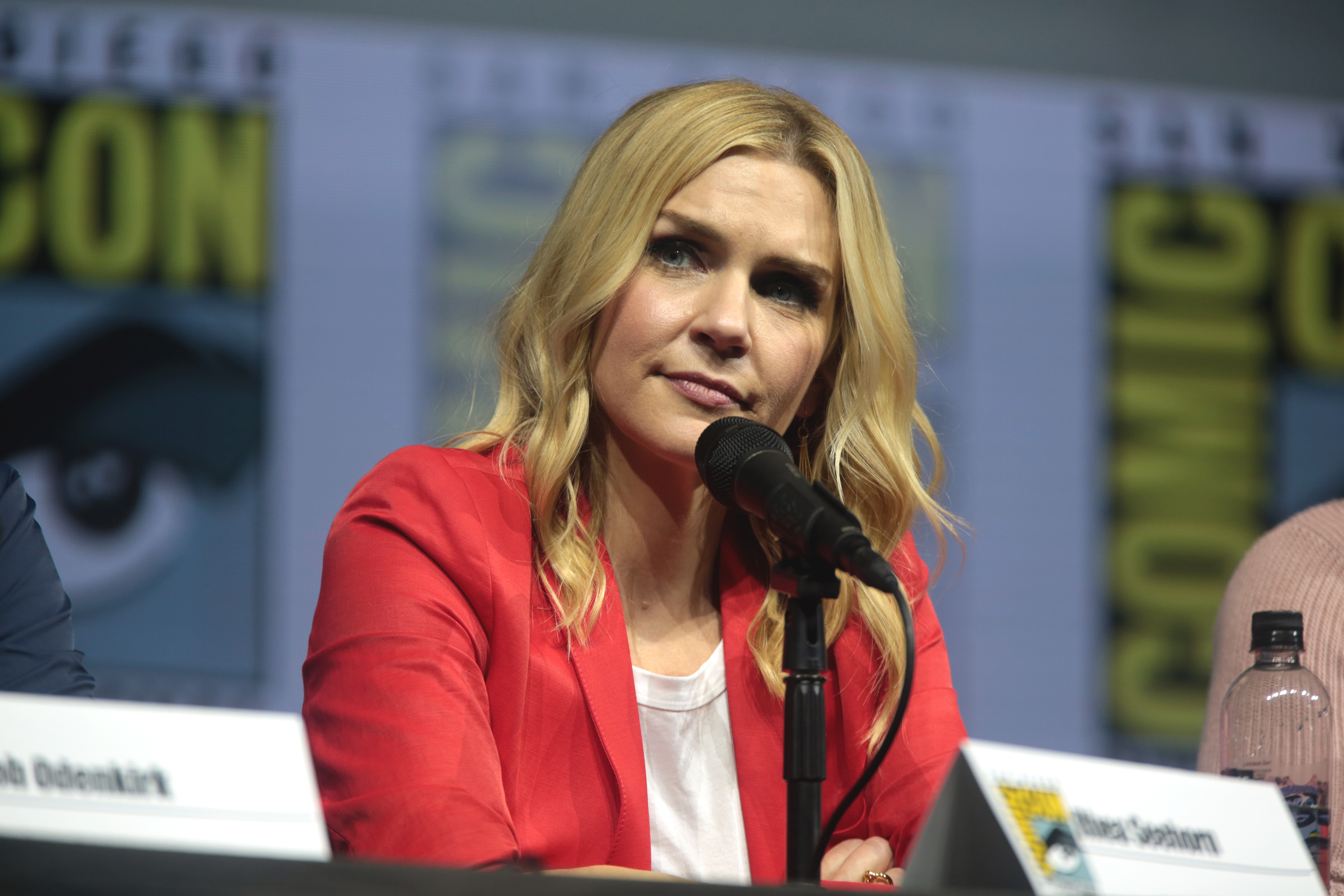
Lead actress Rhea Seehorn

On January 12, 2020, CBS All Access announced that it had given a series order to The Harper House. The series is executive produced by Brad Neely and Katie Krentz. Brian Sheesley serves as supervising director. On October 20, 2020, CBS announced that Ryan Flynn, Rhea Seehorn, Jason Lee, and Tatiana Maslany would star as the Harper family, with Roberta Colindrez, Chris Diamantopoulos, Nyima Funk, Joanna Hausmann, Lance Krall, John "Spud" McConnell, VyVy Nguye, Gabourey Sidibe, Tessa Skara, and Gary Anthony Williams also voicing characters in the series. The 10-episode first season premiered on September 16, 2021.
