= China, IL =

American adult animated sitcom

- Genre: Adult animation Surreal humor Comedy; Animated sitcom
- Created by: Brad Neely
- Written by: Brad Neely
- Directed by: Mike L. Mayfield (S1–2); Griffith Kimmins (S2–3); Angelo Hatgistavrou (S3)
- Starring: Brad Neely; Greta Gerwig; Hulk Hogan; Jeffrey Tambor; Gary Anthony Williams; Jason Walden; Chelsea Peretti; Hannibal Buress; Dave Coulier; Tommy Blacha; Donald Glover
- Composer: Brad Neely
- Country of origin: United States
- Original language: English
- No. of seasons: 3
- No. of episodes: 30 (and 2 pilots) (list of episodes)

Production
- Executive producers: Brad Neely (S2–3); Daniel Weidenfeld; Keith Crofford; Walter Newman
- Producers: Ben Kalina; Chris Prynoski; Vernon Chatman; Shannon Prynoski; Dave Newberg; Ollie Green
- Running time: 11 minutes (S1–2); 22 minutes (S2–3); 44 minutes ("Magical Pet")
- Production companies: Neely Comics; Working for Monsters (S3); Titmouse, Inc.; Williams Street

Original release
- Network: Adult Swim
- Release: May 25, 2008 (pilot)
- Release: October 2, 2011 – June 14, 2015

China, IL (meaning China, Illinois) is an American adult animated sitcom created by Brad Neely for Cartoon Network's nighttime programming block Adult Swim. It follows the surreal adventures of the staff of a college located in the titular city.

The series was originally conceived as a web series on Adult Swim's defunct comedy website, Super Deluxe, in 2008. Neely, who had done I Am Baby Cakes and The Professor Brothers shorts for Super Deluxe in 2006, envisioned the characters in each series to coexist in the same universe. With the relationship in mind, he produced a four-part internet series entitled China, IL, which was published on Super Deluxe in 2008. An 11-minute television special combining the shorts, titled "China, IL: The Funeral", aired on Adult Swim on May 25, 2008. Neely stated that a major inspiration behind the premise of the series derives from his lack of college experiences and his Arkansan upbringing. Episodes are written among a writing staff headed by Neely of six-to-eight people; for voice-over work, the crew works on two or three hours of dialogue for a certain character, followed by storyboard meetings, dailies, and rough cuts, with Neely directing other actors who come in after him.

China, IL ended on June 14, 2015, with a total of 30 episodes, following the series finale "Magical Pet".

== Plot ==
The series takes place at the "Worst College in America", located at the edge of the fictional title town of China, Illinois. The school's uncaring faculty and staff celebrate its poor reputation; they are constantly shown drinking while teaching, or trying to avoid teaching altogether.

== Characters ==
=== Main characters ===
- Steve Smith (voiced by Brad Neely) – The laid-back and hedonistic older brother of Frank Smith who is a history teacher at the University of China, IL.
- Frank Smith (voiced by Brad Neely) – The narcissistic and insecure younger brother of Steve Smith who is also a history teacher at the University of China, IL.
- Pony Merks (voiced by Greta Gerwig) – The teaching assistant of history at the University of China, IL.
- Mark "Baby" Cakes (voiced by Brad Neely) – A large undergraduate who is the son of Leonard Cakes and is often seen with Frank, Steve, and Pony.
- The Dean (voiced by Hulk Hogan) – The unnamed and impossibly macho head of the University of China, IL.

=== Recurring characters ===
- Professor Leonard Cakes (voiced by Jeffrey Tambor) – The father of Mark "Baby" Cakes who is a teacher of "super science".
- Dr. Jack Falgot (voiced by Gary Anthony Williams) – A physician and wrestling coach who runs the campus health center at China, IL.
- Sammy Davis (voiced by Jason Walden) – An elderly female history teacher at the University of China, IL.
- Crystal Peppers (voiced by Chelsea Peretti) – A professor of Spanish, history, and philosophy who is Steve's competitor. It is revealed that she is a transgender woman.
- Matt Attack (voiced by Hannibal Buress) – A student at the University of China, IL. And the star quarterback and pitcher for UCI's football and baseball teams, respectively.
- Gang Sang – A giant panda who is the mascot of the University of China, IL. He is often seen standing around the campus.
- Golden Bowl (voiced by Gary Anthony Williams) – The golden-haired newsman of Channel 3 News and Channel 8 News at China, IL.
- Ronald Reagan (voiced by Dave Coulier) – The 40th President of the United States who has made appearances on this show.
- Mayor (voiced by Tommy Blacha) – The unnamed Mayor of China, IL who is the Dean's nemesis.
- Transfer Billy (voiced by Donald Glover) – New transfer student at UCI.

== Development ==
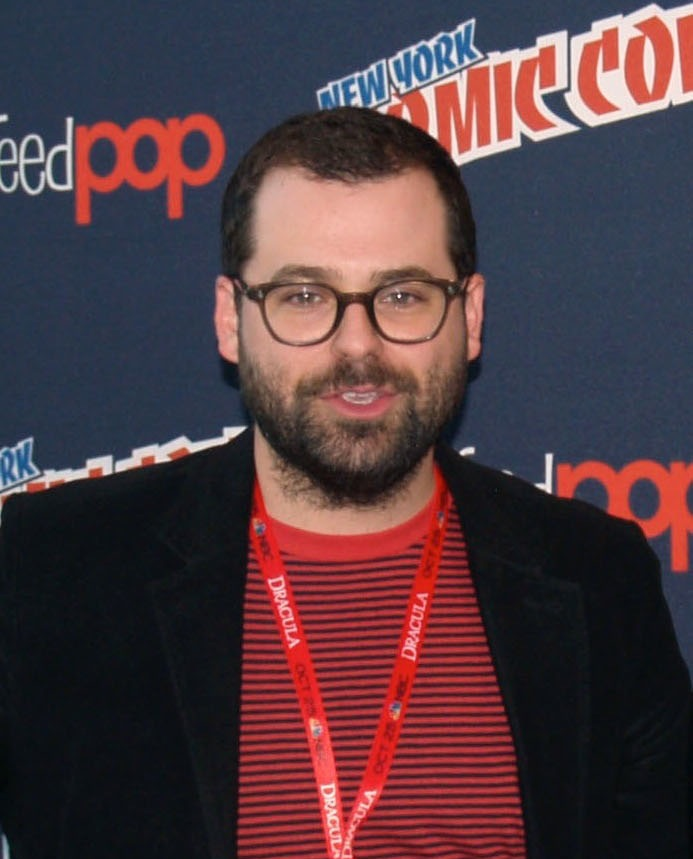
Creator Brad Neely based the series' premise on his view of college.

=== Concept and creation ===
The series was conceived as a web series on Adult Swim's defunct comedy website, Super Deluxe, in 2008. Neely, who had produced I Am Baby Cakes and The Professor Brothers shorts for Super Deluxe in 2006, envisioned the characters in each series to coexist in the same universe. With this relationship in mind, he produced a four-part online series entitled China, IL, hand-drawn by him in his apartment in Austin, Texas. The series was published onto Super Deluxe in 2008. Intended for online consumption, he considered the web series independent from China, IL, due to the differences in format and structure that he stated he feels his work should be dictated by.

Executive producer Daniel Weidenfeld stated in an interview with The Huffington Post that before they knew Super Deluxe would be folded into Adult Swim Video, he talked to senior executive vice president of Adult Swim, Mike Lazzo, about translating the online series to a television special. The special, entitled "China, IL: The Funeral" combined the four-part series into an 11-minute television special, which aired on May 25, 2008. Weidenfeld explained the special "was great, and it was insane that they would have ever put that on TV, but that itself never would have worked as a show." Weidenfeld explained the plot outline for the short, consisting of three stories involving the four main characters; he explained in the interview that having to do "four beginning, middle and ends with one larger beginning, middle and end is the craziest sort of storytelling imaginable." Weidenfeld had previously stated in an interview with MovieWeb that the combination of the shorts "isn't representative of what we've turned this show into. Or what the [original] shorts were, even."

Shortly before Super Deluxe ceased operations, Weidenfeld moved to Los Angeles, while Neely started working as a story consultant for South Park in 2007, during the show's eleventh season. Neely eventually got a deal to write another script for Adult Swim; Weidenfeld and his brother Nick Weidenfeld, who oversaw development for the network encouraged him to use the existing characters in China, IL. Neely stated that he had never done third-person narrative stories for television before, but collaborated with the Weidenfelds anyway and produced a pilot for the network (unrelated to the Super Deluxe shorts); he jokingly stated that "nobody will ever see [it]."

=== Production ===
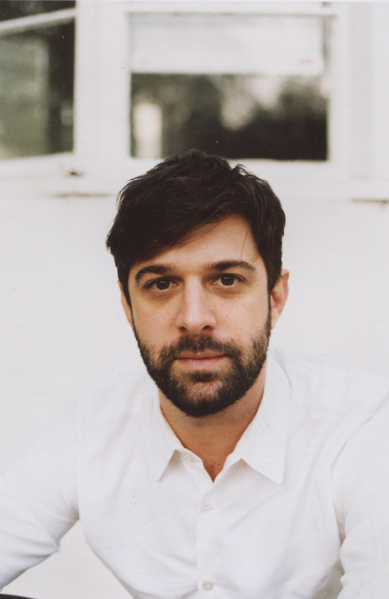
Overseer of development for Adult Swim, Nick Weidenfeld, assisted his brother Daniel along with creator Brad Neely to produce the pilot that would be pitched to the network.

Neely stated in an interview with The A.V. Club that a major inspiration behind the premise of the series derives from his lack of college experiences: "I had this very small slice of an understanding of how college life is. To me, it's high school for adults, and I guess I'm depicting it that way. My sister is a professor. ... I'm around professors, but I'm kind of misinformed a bit. My information is broken and that's what makes China wonky and interesting, because it's what's so fucking wrong about college." Similarly, in the series, Neely parodies popular culture elements that he knows only through passing mentions. The season two episode, "The Diamond Castle", parodies the Mad Men episode, "The Other Woman", which Neely stated he had never watched before; he explained that "We do that often where we'll just take my ignorance and run with it." The A.V. Club interview also has Neely describe aspects of the series inspired by his Arkansan upbringing; he admits that he "talk[s] about [Arkansas] all the time, it turns out. The final episode of the season is about hog infestation. It's happening all over southern United States, where wild boars are just overpopulating—they tear up the land and land owners and cattle ranchers have to hunt these things and put Kevlar vests on their dogs because they have horns and shit."

The second season doubled the running time of the first from 11 minutes to 22 minutes; according to Weidenfeld in an interview with USA Today, this was done in accordance with the network's expanding timeslot. Neely stated that "I think we decided, in concert with the network, that it would benefit the show. The show kept growing, and our storytelling style and structure just needed more room. I didn't know what I was doing when I was writing in the 11-minute format; I was just cramming 22 minutes in there." Weidenfeld considered the first season "essentially 10 mini-pilots" converging into a larger show. He stated that the network thought the increase in length led to a "perfect fit" for the show's expanding universe. He stated that he and his crew had developed up to 300 named characters which will be inserted throughout the series.

In writing for season one, Vernon Chatman, a consulting producer for the series, would assist in outlining and "weighing in" on scripts, while Neely would write all the scripts himself. During season one, Neely said his staff would make each episode encapsulate various genres, stating "We're trying to tell as many different things as we can do in a quarter-hour." Since season two, with the episodes being 22 minutes, the series employs six to eight writers per episode. In their writing room, the crew discusses a given episode synopsis and create a detailed, 22-page outline, which gets sent to the network for notes. After the network approves of the outline and the crew is satisfied with it, the outline gets made into a script, which also goes through the network for notes. According to Neely in the Huffington Post interview, at the height of production of the second season, the production crew was working on six or seven episodes simultaneously, all at various stages of completion.

In the United States, the special was rated TV-MA, while the series is rated TV-14. When asked about the network's Standards and Practices, Weidenfeld stated that "I find when something comes back that you can't say, we're able to skirt around it and make something funnier." According to Neely and Weidenfeld, the network forced them to cut smoking out of the show; Jack Falgot, a character in the series, was planned to smoke on a cigarette in every scene he appeared in. The network issued to have the cigarette changed to a lollipop for broadcast. Neely revealed that his team try to incorporate some of the "hallmark components" of his shorts (e.g. first-person narrative and flashbacks), but find their audience not "really have the patience for that sort of thing". In sticking to a mostly third-person narrative, his team is more confident in the reception toward the series.

An episode takes approximately one year to complete; Neely states that six or seven episodes may be produced simultaneously, all at various stages. Animation is done at Titmouse, Inc. in Los Angeles. When asked about the slideshow presentation of his animated shorts in an interview with The College Hill Independent, Neely felt that the approach was not "an aesthetic choice, it was sort of the only thing I was able to do. I'm not an animator." He stated that, out of "ignorance and not having a whole lot of options", he hand-drew each frame on paper and scanned them into a computer; he felt the restrictions "really paid off and I enjoyed the form. ... But, it never was something I felt I was needing to defend or stick to, or that it represented me artistically." Other changes to the art style from the shorts were dictated by animation director, Mike L. Mayfield. Weidenfeld stated that Mayfield "was instrumental in turning Brad's original style into what we had the first season." Among them were the addition of pupils which, according to Weidenfeld, some of Neely's fans were unhappy over. Neely states that "I had a long run of drawing those Orphan Annie style of eyes. That worked well for print. But as soon as things move, the characters start to look like zombies."

=== Cast ===
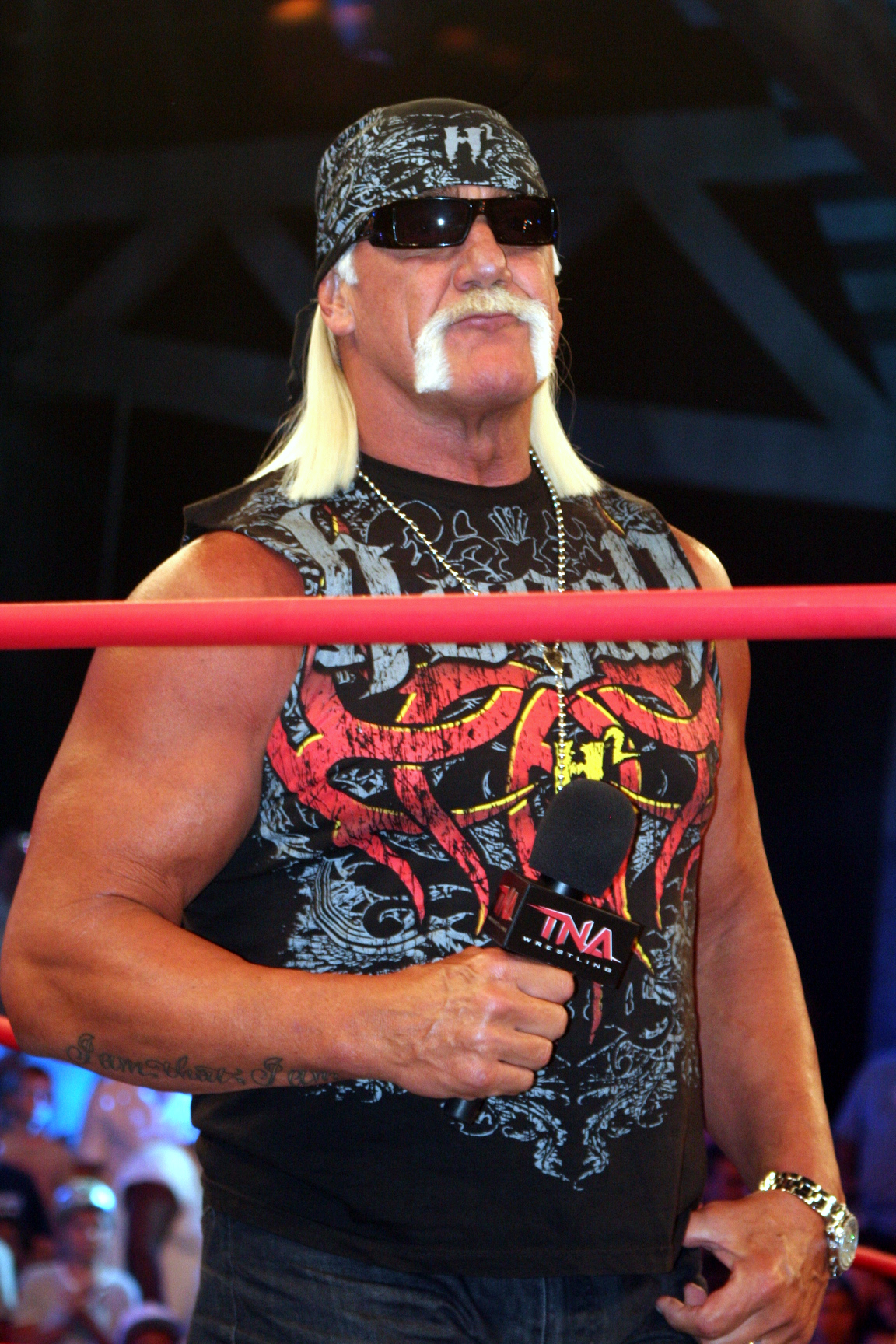
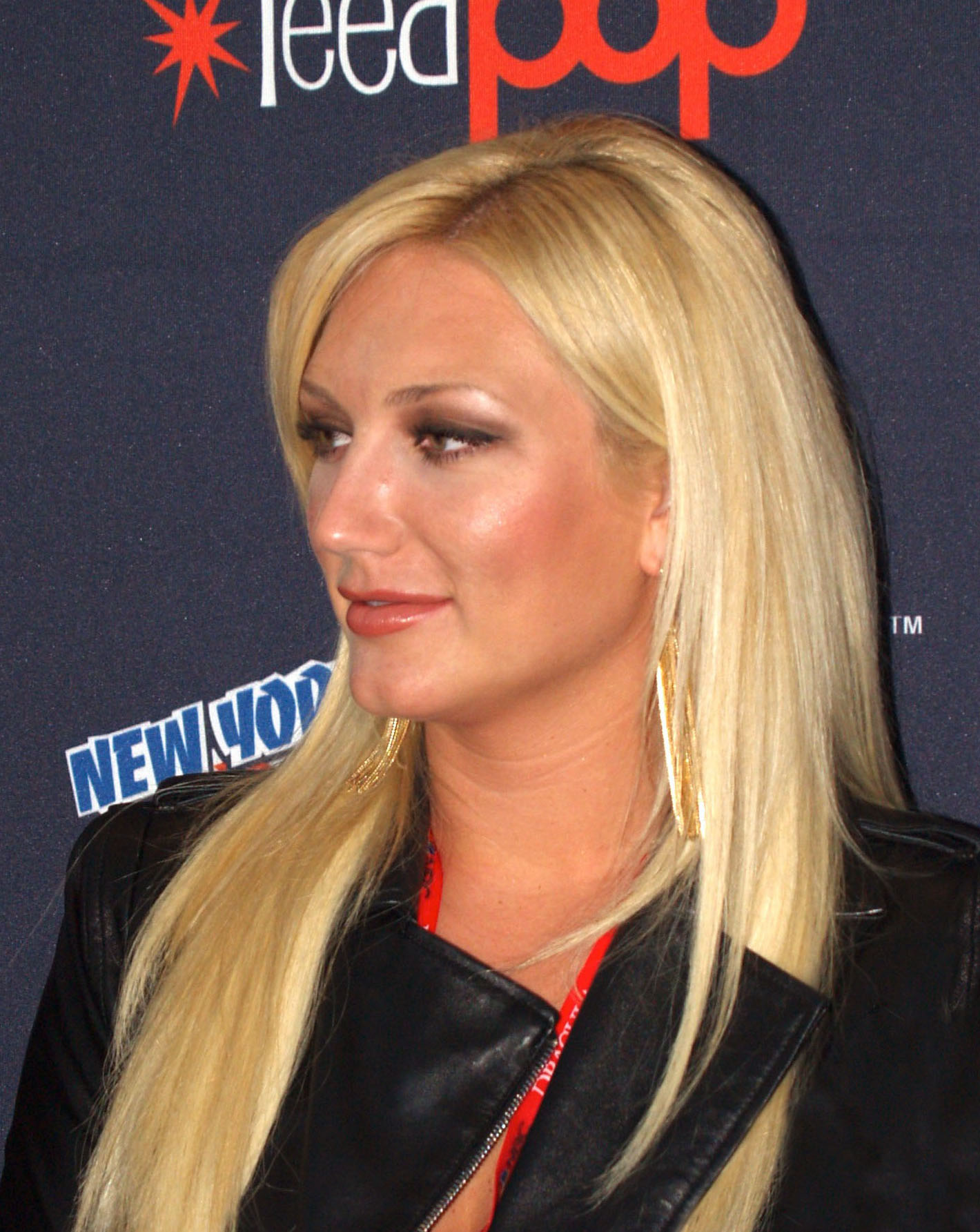
Father–daughter pair Hulk Hogan and Brooke Hogan provided the voices for the Dean and various characters, respectively.

Brad Neely provides the voices for Steve Smith, Frank Smith, and Mark "Baby" Cakes; Weidenfeld states that Neely does "the heavy lifting with the voices ... every episode, he's probably at least 40% of the lines." According to him, it allows for production to run more seamlessly: "Rather than hav[ing] to wait for somebody else's schedule, we just go next door and do it." Neely also records temporary "scratch" lines for other actors to speed up production. Neely stated that in voicing "a full episode's work of somebody, we start the day as an actor." For voice-over work, the crew works on two or three hours of dialogue for a certain character, followed by storyboard meetings, dailies, and rough cuts, with Neely directing other actors who come in after him.

Greta Gerwig voices Pony Merks, and Hulk Hogan portrayed the Dean. Neely states that both were enthusiastic upon reading sample scripts given by them. Jackie Buscarino, Jason Alexander and Brooke Hogan voice various characters throughout the series. According to Brooke, she got involved in the series after being recommended by her father, Hulk Hogan, who voiced the Dean. For the recurring cast: Tommy Blacha plays The Mayor, the Dean's long-time nemesis; Dave Coulier portrays Ronald Reagan; Chelsea Peretti voices Crystal Peppers (and Kim among other various characters), Steve's competitor and a professor of Spanish and History; Jeffrey Tambor voices the father of Baby Cakes and professor of "super science", Leonard Cakes; Jason Walden plays Sammy Davis, a history professor, and Gary Anthony Williams portrays Dr. Jack Falgot, who runs the campus health center.

=== Music ===
Neely, who started recording songs at age 14, drew musical inspiration from improvisational sessions between him and his friends as teenagers. Neely stated in the Huffington Post interview that over 50 songs had been planned for the second season throughout, though only 50 had been selected. In an interview with Comic Book Resources, Neely and Weidenfeld have stated their intentions on doing a musical episode (which they did, the third season's finale). Weidenfeld stated that producing one "would be a difficult thing to write up front, but a Music Man style episode would just be incredible to do. And Brad could do it."

== Episodes ==
Season	Episodes	Originally released	
Season	Episodes	First released	Last released
Pilots	2 (1 unaired)	May 25, 2008	January 10, 2010
1	10	October 2, 2011	March 4, 2012
2	10	September 22, 2013	November 24, 2013
3	10	April 5, 2015	June 14, 2015

The series has completed three seasons with ten episodes each. The first season premiered on October 2, 2011, in the United States; it concluded on March 5, 2012. The second season premiered on September 22, 2013, in the United States; its season finale aired on November 24, 2013. A third season premiered April 5, 2015, continuing the previous seasons 22-minute run time; its season finale, also the series finale, "Magical Pet", aired on June 14, 2015. Brad Neely has confirmed on Twitter that the show is "done forever".

== Reception ==
=== Ratings ===
The series premiere was broadcast on October 6, 2011 and was watched by 888,000 viewers. According to Turner Broadcasting, the premiere increased viewership among men aged 18–24 by 177,000 viewers, meaning that viewership increased 9 percent in its premiere timeslot. Another press release published by Turner reported that the second season saw a double-digit percentage increase in viewership from the first; the second-season premiere was watched by 1.285 million viewers, marking an increase from the first-season premiere.

=== Critical reviews ===
The series has received positive critical reception; in reviewing the series premiere, Phil Dyess-Nugent of The A.V. Club stated that "Neely's talent is still most evident in the strange twists and turns of his imagination and odd spurts of verbal surrealism". He wrote that "the look of the thing is just the delivery system, though there are some striking images and even the occasional striking piece of 'acting'". He described the animation as looking "fairly cheap"; however, he complemented the "soft, pastel-colored style that blunts the obnoxiousness of some of the jokes without blurring out the edge", he stated, that contrasts the style of Adult Swim programs. Jason Zinoman of The New York Times called the series "gleefully deranged", stating the writing of the series "threatens to but never quite tips over into the overwritten cleverness of so much television comedy these days." He compared the art style of the series to South Park, calling it "more lifelike [...] but not by much."

Charles Webb of MTV Geek summarized the first season as "one of the most enjoyably demented shows to make its debut in the Adult Swim lineup this year". He compared it to Superjail! in terms of reaching the aforementioned series' "sweet spot of animated mayhem for me while merrily bouncing along with its boozed-up, sexed-up, lazy, spiteful, underdog faculty all under the employ of a dean voiced by Hulk Hogan." Bradford Evans of Splitsider listed the series as one of the best comedy television series to premiere out of the 2011–12 television seasons. He summarized the first season as a "fast-paced 11-minute animated series ... worthy of catching up on", and praised it for retaining "[Neely's] sensibilities that made him an Internet sensation". Terri Schwartz of Zap2it, in addition to interviewing Neely and Weidenfeld at Titmouse, Inc., gave the second season a positive review. She stated that "Viewers who didn't watch China, IL Season 1 can jump into Season 2 without feeling like they missed anything major."
