= Brad Neely's Harg Nallin' Sclopio Peepio =

American animated television series

- Genre: Sketch comedy
- Created by: Brad Neely
- Written by: Laura Chinn; Gabe Delahaye; Shelby Fero; Chris Goodwin; Angelo Hatgistavrou; Brad Neely; Dave Newberg; Daniel Weidenfeld
- Directed by: Angelo Hatgistavrou
- Voices of: Brad Neely; Affion Crockett; Ilana Glazer; Darrell Hammond; Gabourey Sidibe; Mary Elizabeth Winstead; Lizzo; André 3000; Chelsea Peretti; Kristen Schaal; Jeffrey Tambor; Father John Misty
- Composer: Brad Neely
- Country of origin: United States
- Original language: English
- No. of seasons: 1
- No. of episodes: 10

Production
- Executive producers: Brad Neely; Dave Newberg; Daniel Weidenfeld
- Running time: 11 minutes
- Production companies: Neely Comics; Working for Monsters; Titmouse, Inc.; Williams Street

Original release
- Network: Adult Swim
- Release: July 10 – September 18, 2016

Brad Neely's Harg Nallin' Sclopio Peepio is an American adult animated television series created by Brad Neely, who was also the creator of China, IL. Formatted as a sketch comedy show, it is made up of short films and routines, with songs composed by Neely. The series aired on Adult Swim from July 10 to September 18, 2016.

On November 15, 2016, the series was canceled after one season.

== Contents ==
An animated sketch-comedy show, Harg Nallin' comprises short, singular routines, short films, and songs. Each episode is 15 minutes long, with some sketches lasting only a few seconds. As part of the main cast, Affion Crockett, Ilana Glazer, Darrell Hammond, Gabourey Sidibe, and Neely provide the voices of various characters. One guest star appears each episode.

== Production ==
Brad Neely's Harg Nallin' Sclopio Peepio was announced a week before Adult Swim's upfront in the second week of May 2015. (Note: The show's previous title of TV Sucks was changed during production of the show's first season.) The show is the creation of Brad Neely, who conceived another Adult Swim program, China, IL. Daniel Weidenfeld, executive producer of the aforementioned series, holds the same position on Sclopio Peepio, as does Neely and Dave Newberg. Production of the first season commenced during production of China's third season and ended in January 2016. Before China was canceled in July 2015, the crew was given the impression Sclopio Peepio could intersect with the universe of China while the two aired simultaneously. Neely wanted to produce a fast-paced sketch comedy series because he feels both those qualities apply nicely to animation.

Borrowing the method used for writing China, IL, the show's writers work in a room where they propose roughly 50 ideas for sketches in a sitting. Some of these ideas derive from a list developed by Neely in the course of his life. By the end of the first season's production, 600 sketches were written, but only half were incorporated in the ten episodes of that season. According to Neely, the sketches discussing celebrities like Kanye West or Taylor Swift express his "strange associations" with those subjects rather than that of general public, leading to those sketches making the least sense. A large portion of the sketches are musical, with all songs composed by Neely. In June 2015, Neely was composing 75 pieces; a year later he had completed 100, but only 60 to 70 would appear in the first season.

The production company Titmouse, Inc., provides animation. With Sclopio Peepio, Weidenfeld expressed wanting a return to the arrangement and style of The Professor Brothers and Baby Cakes, two web series by Neely. Both led to the creation of China, which includes the title characters from those web series. The crew had even proposed sketches including characters from China, IL, but these were later cut.

== Title ==
The show's unusual title, according to Neely, is "intentionally meaningless," being made up of the staff's "favorite collection of syllables." It was originally going to be titled TV Sucks, but was renamed during production.

== Release and reception ==
The first episode was released on Vine on June 27, 2016, ahead of its July 10 air date, making the show the first television program to have an episode released on the video-hosting service.

Devin D. O'Leary of the Weekly Alibi found the show unfunny as a whole, perhaps interesting only to enthusiasts of the network's increasingly strange programming. Daniel Kurland of the American Den of Geek, on the other hand, gave it four-and-a-half out of five stars. He called the music catchy and entertaining in their lyrical density and praised the visuals' Dadaism. The short length of some of his favorite sketches was cited as a disappointment.

== Episodes ==
No.	Title	Guest star(s)	Original release date	US viewers (millions)
1	"For Streep"	Mary Elizabeth Winstead, Lizzo	July 10, 2016	0.96
2	"For Knowles"	Lizzo	July 17, 2016	0.98
3	"For Aretha"	André 3000	July 24, 2016	1.09
4	"For Blanchett"	Lizzo	July 31, 2016	1.018
5	"For the Jenners"	Chelsea Peretti	August 7, 2016	0.934
6	"For Winona"	Lizzo	August 14, 2016	1.016
7	"For Sarandon"	Kristen Schaal	August 21, 2016	1.092
8	"For Johansson"	Lizzo	August 28, 2016	1.052
9	"For Charlize"	Jeffrey Tambor	September 11, 2016	0.906
10	"For Alba"	Father John Misty	September 18, 2016	0.808
