= Y'All So Stupid =

- Created by: Devin Flynn
- Voices of: Devin Flynn; Lance Lamont; Todd James; Debbie Tuch
- No. of seasons: 1
- No. of episodes: 13

Production
- Running time: 3-5 minutes 1 minute (ep. 11 only)

Original release
- Network: Super Deluxe
- Release: January 17, 2007 – December 17, 2008

Y'All So Stupid is a sketch comedy web series created by Devin Flynn, an animation director for Wonder Showzen, for SuperDeluxe.com. The series lasted for thirteen episodes before being cancelled in December 2008, before Super Deluxe formed into adultswim.com. The web series received a 2008 Webby Award.

== SuperStupid ==
Five years after the cancellation of Y'All So Stupid. A two-minute pilot was produced by Flynn and Mondo Media titled SuperStupid. The series was never picked up, however.

== Other works ==
Devin Flynn, the creator of the show, would later go on to animate the opening sequence for Aqua Teen Hunger Force Colon Movie Film For Theaters, while Y'All So Stupid was still airing.

== Advertising ==
Various clips were broadcast on Adult Swim in 2007, via promoting Super Deluxe at that time.

== Availability ==
All episodes have resurfaced onto YouTube, as an hour-long marathon on Super Deluxe's YouTube channel, due to the revival of Super Deluxe. All episodes have also been released separately.
