= YoMeryl =

Collaborative art duo

- Born: Bronwyn Lundberg, Sarah Zucker
- Style: Pop art

YoMeryl (founded in 2014) is the name of a pop art duo made up of Bronwyn Lundberg and Sarah Zucker. The name also refers to their gallery and design studio. Lundberg and Zucker are also longtime girlfriends.

YoMeryl's subject matter is varied. Many of the images depict women, such as The Golden Girls, or various lesbian icons. Other influences include RuPaul and The Simpsons.

YoMeryl's first museum commission was from the Brooklyn Museum in collaboration with Lady Gaga's creative producer and Brooklyn Museum board member, Nicole Ehrlich. YoMeryl created pop art inspired GIF animations where famous women interact with various exhibits in the museum. While the GIF art is currently only available digitally, Zucker has said that lenticular versions of the work might be a viable way to translate the GIFs to the physical space of the museum. Zucker has already worked out how to translate her work using lenticular printing and sees the GIF as a modern artistic irreverence.

YoMeryl also offers various kinds of apparel for sale from T-shirts to custom earbuds.

YoMeryl has gone on to create large scale public murals for the city of West Hollywood, GIF animations for the CDC, and more varieties of pop art animation.
