= Pat Viray =

American soccer player (born 1985)

Personal information
- Full name: Patrick Viray
- Date of birth: November 14, 1985 (age 41)
- Place of birth: Reston, Virginia, U.S.
- Height: 5 ft 10 in (1.78 m)
- Position: Midfielder

Youth career
- 2001–2004: South Lakes Seahawks

College career
Years	Team	Apps	(Gls)
2004–2007	VCU Rams	68	(15)

Senior career*
Years	Team	Apps	(Gls)
2008	Richmond Kickers	14	(1)
- * Club domestic league appearances and goals as of November 15, 2018

Pat Viray (born November 14, 1985) is an American former professional soccer player who last played with the Richmond Kickers of the USL Second Division (now USL League One). Viray played college soccer for the VCU Rams.

== Career ==
Viray played one season of professional soccer with the Richmond Kickers. He made 14 appearances, scoring once.
