= Hot Tub with Kurt and Kristen =

- Also known as: Hot Tub Variety Show
- Genre: Comedy; Variety; Improv
- Created by: Kurt Braunohler; Kristen Schaal

Production
- Producer: CleftClips
- Production locations: Los Angeles, United States

Related
- The Super Serious Show

Hot Tub is a weekly variety show hosted by Kurt Braunohler and Kristen Schaal. The show features a mix of alternative comedy from unknown performers to more established comedians. In 2005, Hot Tub was voted “Best Variety Show” by Time-Out New York’s reader poll and has quickly become one of L.A.’s most popular live comedy events. During the first seven years the show saw considerable success at The PIT in Manhattan and Littlefield in Brooklyn, New York. In 2013, under the helm of The Super Serious Show producers CleftClips, Hot Tub relocated to the West Coast at The Virgil in Silver Lake, Los Angeles. In January, 2023, the show again relocated to Permanent Records Roadhouse in the Cypress Park neighborhood of Northeast Los Angeles.

== Style ==
Hot Tub harbors comedy acts that are unusual, odd, experimental, and generally free-wheeling. The show is also a venue in which well-known comedians try out new material and more eccentric bits. There is a great deal of improv, absurd performance art, and audience interaction in many performances. Much of Braunohler and Schaal’s material is fostered by the chemistry that developed from their friendship and extensive professional relationship.

== Notable performers ==
- Aziz Ansari
- Eugene Mirman
- Janeane Garofalo
- Kristen Schaal
- Kurt Braunohler
- Reggie Watts
- John Hodgeman
- Dan Ilic
- T.J. Miller
- Dan St. Germain
- Demetri Martin
- Patton Oswalt
- Kevin Meaney
