= Sarah Zucker =

American artist and writer (born 1985)

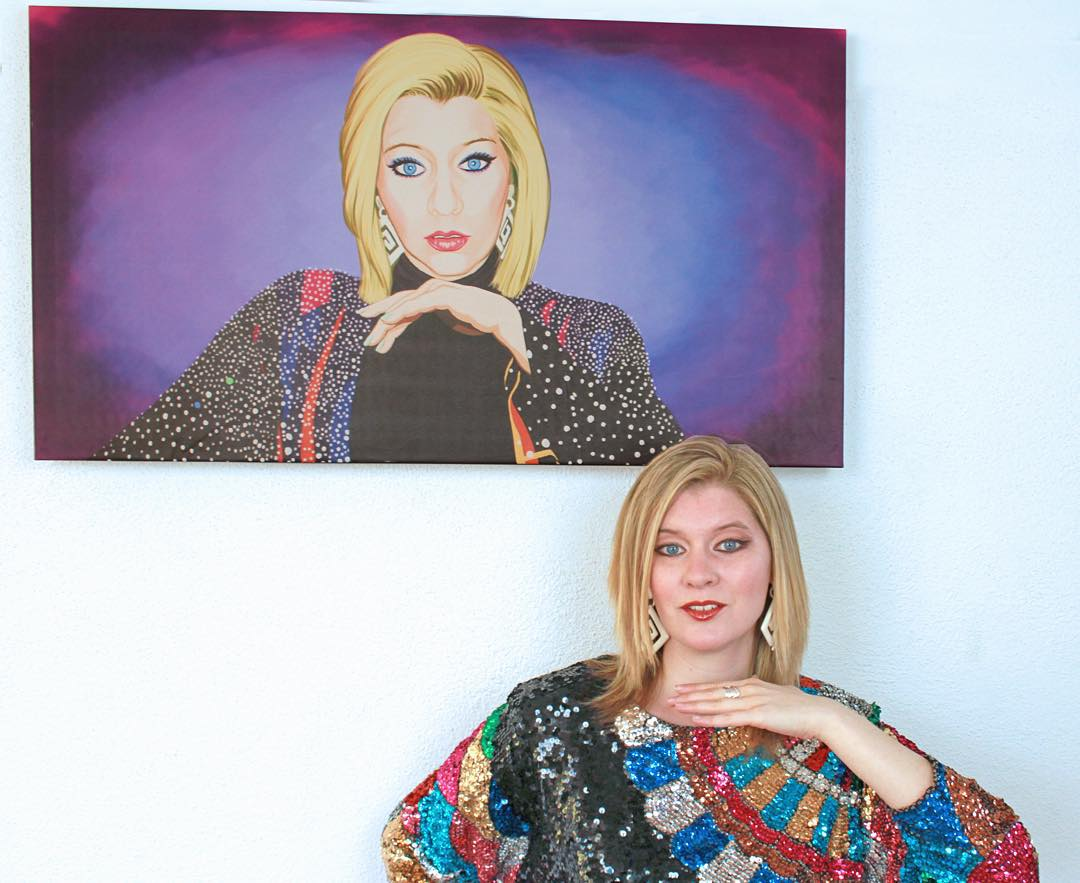
- Education: Northwestern University (BA); New York University (MFA)
- Known for: video art, digital art, comedy writing
- Website: http://www.sarahzucker.com

Sarah Zucker, born 1985, is an American visual artist and writer based in Hollywood, Los Angeles. Known online as The Sarah Show, she specializes in mixing contemporary digital techniques with older analog approaches, such as VHS. Zucker is considered a pioneer of crypto art, releasing digital editions of her video art as non-fungible tokens since 2019.

== Life and career ==
Zucker's work combines video, digital imagery, humor and psychedelic elements. She has described her own work as "time-moshing".

In 2014 Zucker co-founded the design and animation studio YoMeryl with artist Bronwyn Lundberg. The duo presented animated GIFs at the Brooklyn Museum.

In 2021, Zucker's work was included in Sotheby's Natively Digital NFT sale and Bonhams' CryptOGs: The Pioneers of NFT Art.

== Selected art shows ==
- "Natively Digital" at Sotheby's, 2021
- "Venus of Metaverse: A Celebration of Women Creators in Crypto Art" at Tara Digital Collective, 2021
- "CryptOGs": The Pioneers of NFT Art" at Bonhams, 2021
- "Right Click + Save" at Le Freeport in Singapore, 2021
- "DART2121" at Museo della Permanente in Milan, 2021
- "The Gateway" presented by NFTNow x Christie’s at Art Basel Miami, 2021
- "Block Party" at Christie’s Dubai, 2022

== Trivia ==
Zucker is a Jeopardy! champion.
