= Christopher Royal =

American football player and coach (born 1983)

Chris Royal
Virginia–Lynchburg Dragons
- Title: Offensive coordinator

Personal information
- Born: January 19, 1983 (age 43); Reston, Virginia, U.S.
- Listed height: 5 ft 10 in (1.78 m)
- Listed weight: 195 lb (88 kg)

Career information
- High school: South Lakes (Reston, Virginia); Fork Union Military Academy (Fork Union, Virginia)
- College: Marshall
- NFL draft: 2006: undrafted

Career history

Playing
- Wilkes-Barre/Scranton Pioneers (2007); Georgia Force (2008); Iowa Barnstormers (2009); Tulsa Talons (2010); Kansas City Command (2011); San Jose SaberCats (2011); Utah Blaze (2011); Huntington Hammer (2012)*; Milwaukee Mustangs (2012); River City Raiders (2016)*
- * Offseason or practice squad member only

Coaching
- Marshall (GA) (2011); Glenville State (WR) (2014–2015); Lindenwood (DB) (2016); Morehead State (CB) (2017–2018); UT Martin (Nickels) (2022); Millsaps (DC) (2023); Virginia–Lynchburg (OC) (2024–present)

Awards and highlights
- 2011 Beef 'O' Brady's Bowl Champion; af2 Rookie of the Year (2007); 2002 Mid-American Conference Champion; 2002 GMAC Bowl Champion

Career AFL statistics
- Tackles: 235
- Interceptions: 28
- Fumble Recovories: 1
- Pass breakups: 63
- Stats at ArenaFan.com

Christopher Winmond Royal (born January 19, 1983) is an American former football quarterback and defensive back and current cornerbacks coach for Morehead State University.

== Early life ==
Royal attended South Lakes High School for 4 years, and Fork Union Military Academy for 1 year, where he played football and also lettered three years in track. He posted 3,050 career passing yards over two seasons with 38 touchdown passes, while rushing for 689 yards and 12 scores. He broke school records for passing yards in a game (304 with three TDs), as well as for passing yards in a season (1,600) and was named All-District as a quarterback following his junior and senior years. He was the top ranked quarterback and defensive back in the Northern Region of Virginia and was ranked statistically as the No. 2 quarterback in the state. He led the state in interceptions with eight his senior year, when he was selected team captain and was team offensive player of the year. As a defensive player, he recorded 47 tackles and 21 knockdowns as a senior. He was also an All-District performer in track and field, competing in the 200-meter dash, 100-meter dash, triple jump, long jump, high jump, 55-meter dash, 55-meter hurdles, 110 meter hurdles, and 300-meter hurdles. He was also an honor roll student during his senior year.

== College career ==
Royal attended Marshall University in Huntington, West Virginia, where he played as a defensive back. As a junior in 2004, Chris led the Mid-American Conference with 6 interceptions.

== Professional career ==
Royal was invited to the Washington Redskins rookie minicamp in 2006. He was the 2007 Spalding Rookie of the Year for the Wilkes-Barre/Scranton Pioneers of the AF2, after leading the league in interceptions with 14 regular season and 2 postseason (3 total touchdowns).

Royal was second in the Arena Football League in interceptions with 11 while playing for the Tulsa Talons. Royal currently holds franchise records for the Wilkes Barre-Scranton Pioneers and the Tulsa Talons for interceptions.

== Personal ==
Chris Royal is the older brother of free agent NFL wide receiver Eddie Royal.
