= Bunk (TV series) =

- Genre: Comedy; Game show
- Presented by: Kurt Braunohler
- Country of origin: United States
- Original language: English
- No. of seasons: 1
- No. of episodes: 10

Production
- Executive producers: Kurt Braunohler; Dan Lubetkin; Eric Bryant; Ethan T. Berlin; David Martin; Jon Thoday; Richard Allen-Turner
- Production locations: New York City, New York, US
- Running time: 22 minutes
- Production companies: Avalon Television; IFC Original Productions

Original release
- Network: IFC
- Release: June 8 – August 20, 2012

Bunk is a comedy television game show hosted by Kurt Braunohler on IFC in 2012. It was greenlit after being shown at the New York Television Festival. The show featured a rotating panel of three comedian contestants responding to comedic game show prompts in an improvised way. Notable contestants included Dana Gould, Kumail Nanjiani, Eugene Mirman and Alex Borstein.

During an appearance on The Best Show on WFMU with Tom Scharpling, Braunohler announced that Bunk had been canceled.
