= Kurt Braunohler =

American comedian (born 1976)

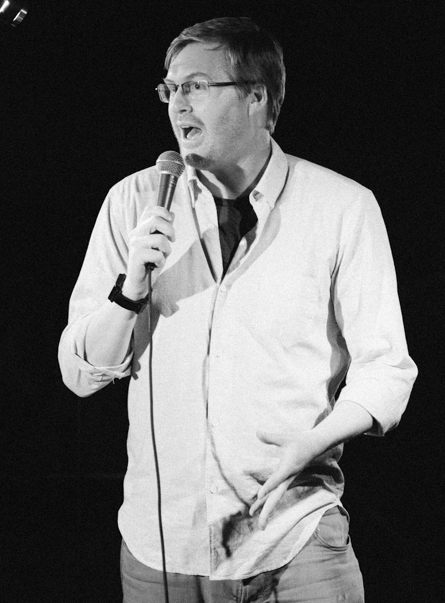
- Braunohler performing in 2013
- Born: February 22, 1976 (age 50); Neptune, New Jersey, United States
- Occupations: Comedian, host
- Notable work: The K Ohle with Kurt Braunohler, Bunk
- Spouse: Lauren Cook (m. 2014)
- Website: www.kurtbraunohler.com

Kurt Braunohler (born February 22, 1976) is an American comedian and co-host of the podcast Bananas on Exactly Right Podcast Network. He was previously the host of IFC's comedy game show Bunk and has appeared on Comedy Central, This American Life, and Radiolab. Braunohler is a frequent collaborator with Kristen Schaal, with whom he created the web series Penelope Princess of Pets.

== Career ==
Braunohler's first major project was the performance project Kurtbot. This was a series of street comedy sketches along with an accompanying website. He had more success with the street theatre project Chengwin. His work with the group earned a number of awards, including being voted by the Village Voice as "Best Hilarious Insane Guerilla Theatre" in 2008.

In 2004, Braunohler began the Neutrino Video Projects. His work with the group garnered widespread praise, and in 2005 the group traveled to the HBO US Comedy Arts Festival in Aspen, as well as to the Edinburgh Festival Fringe in Scotland. The Neutrino Video Projects were awarded "Improv Ensemble of the Year" by the Chicago Improv Festival in 2004.

In 2005, Braunohler began co-hosting Hot Tub with Kristen Schaal, which was voted "Best Variety Show of 2005" by Time Out NY's reader poll.

In 2017, Braunohler had a supporting role in the widely acclaimed movie The Big Sick.

=== Standup ===
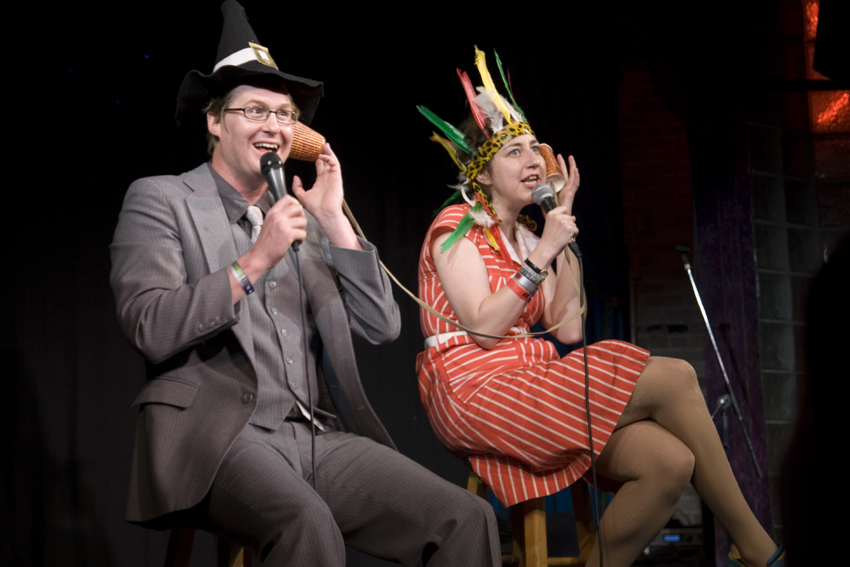
Braunohler and Kristen Schaal on stage at SXSW Comedy Fest, 2010

Braunohler was named one of Variety's "Top 10 Comics to Watch" in 2012, as well as Time Out NY's "50 Funniest New Yorkers". Among other venues Braunohler has performed at the HBO US Comedy Arts Festival, The Comedy Festival, Just for Laughs Comedy Festival in Montreal and Chicago, New York Comedy Festival (named a "Comic to Watch"), SXSW, Bonnaroo, All Tomorrow's Parties, the Edinburgh Fringe Festival (IF.Comedy Award nominee), Melbourne Comedy Festival (Barry Award Winner), the HBO Vegas Comedy Festival, the Chicago Improv Festival ("Improv Ensemble of the Year" Award Winner).

Braunohler's debut comedy album, How Do I Land? was released by Kill Rock Stars on August 20, 2013. The album was recorded live on February 13, 2013, in Seattle, Washington, and February 14, 2013, in Portland, Oregon. In March 2013, Braunohler completed a successful $4,000 Kickstarter campaign by hiring a professional pilot to skywrite "How Do I Land?" in Southern California, in promotion of the album.

=== Radio and podcasts ===
In February 2012, Braunohler was featured episode 457 of This American Life, "What I Did For Love," where he discussed his experience bringing the concept of rumspringa to his monogamous relationship of 13 years. He and his comedy partner Kristen Schaal also appeared on the "Loops" episode of Radiolab in October 2011, and in 2009 the two hosted "High Five! with Kurt and Kristen" on the Sirius XM Satellite Radio Raw Dog Channel. Braunohler also hosted The K Ohle with Kurt Braunohler podcast on the Nerdist network, as well as its spin-off, Emotional Hangs, with co-host Joe DeRosa. He has since become the co-host of Bananas, a podcast on Exactly Right Podcast Network.

In 2014, Braunohler guest starred in the episode "Namer vs. Namer" of John Hodgman's podcast Judge John Hodgman.

=== TV and digital media ===
In 2012 Braunohler hosted the improv game show Bunk on the Independent Film Channel. Since 2012 Braunohler has been an occasional voice contributor to Fox's animated series Bob's Burgers, and he is a frequent roundtable guest on the E! network show Chelsea Lately. He has also performed on Comedy Central's John Oliver Presents. Braunohler was active on Vine, and was named one of the best comedians using the video phone app by Funny or Die.

Braunohler's first television special premiered on Comedy Central on March 3, 2017.

== Personal life ==
Braunholer lived in Asbury Park, New Jersey, before moving to Neptune City, New Jersey.He graduated from the Christian Brothers Academy in 1994. He majored in both English and philosophy at Johns Hopkins University, Baltimore. He became engaged to Lauren Cook in April 2014, and the two got married on September 28, 2014.

== Discography ==
- How Do I Land? (2013)
- Trust Me (2017)
- Fire Crotch, Icy Bottom (2020)
- Banana hammock summer (2020)
