= Super Deluxe =

Entertainment company

- Website type: Entertainment
- Available in: English
- Founded: January 17, 2007; 19 years ago
- Dissolved: October 19, 2018; 8 years ago
- Headquarters: Los Angeles, California, U. S.
- Owner: Turner Broadcasting System
- Founder: Wolfgang Hammer
- Key people: Wolfgang Hammer; (president)
- Website: superdeluxe.com
- Launched: Old iteration: January 17, 2007 – December 17, 2008 (700 days); New iteration: December 9, 2015 – October 19, 2018 (1045 days)
- Current status: Defunct

Super Deluxe was an entertainment company owned by Turner Broadcasting. Founded by Turner Entertainment executives Marc Lazarus and Drew Reifenberger in 2006, the company's main output was in online video, television series, and documentaries. It was revived in the 2010s by media executive Wolfgang Hammer.

== History ==
Turner Broadcasting System announced the launch of Super Deluxe, a digital comedy website, in October 2006. Super Deluxe was first launched on January 17, 2007 and featured digital shorts by comedians including Bob Odenkirk, Maria Bamford, Tim Heidecker, and Eric Wareheim. The website was folded into Adult Swim.com on May 7, 2008.

=== Revival ===
Super Deluxe was relaunched as a new entity in late 2015. The "new" Super Deluxe was a separate entity from its original incarnation, only connected by name. The network features short form videos including comedic shorts, political satire, animation, and music videos. The Super Deluxe production studio focuses on television series and feature films.

Among these videos are Donald Trump related videos by Vic Berger, a frequent collaborator for the comedy duo Tim & Eric. Each of these videos remixes various debate appearances with air horns and crowds chanting Trump's name. During both the 2016 Republican National Convention and the 2016 Democratic National Convention, both Berger and Tim Heidecker covered the events on the Super Deluxe channel. Berger also created an "Oscar bait" version of the 2015 film Straight Outta Compton for Super Deluxe.

In 2017, Vicente Fox, the former President of Mexico, appeared in a series of videos on the channel. In these videos, Fox criticized Trump on a variety of issues, including his proposal to build a wall between America and Mexico and his Cinco de Mayo taco bowl tweet.

In September 2018, it was announced that Super Deluxe, alongside Blink Industries and Conaco, would be producing new episodes of the British web series Don't Hug Me I'm Scared.

On October 19, 2018, Turner Entertainment announced that it would be shutting down Super Deluxe, citing duplication with other WarnerMedia lines of business.

On August 9, 2019, American entertainment company Fullscreen acquired the rights to Super Deluxe and has rebranded the company as Tatered, focusing on similar content as its predecessor. The first Tatered video was uploaded on August 26, 2019, announcing the rebrand and future content.

== Series produced for Super Deluxe ==
Various Super Deluxe programs have featured celebrities such as Billie Eilish, Maria Bamford, Richard Belzer, Norm MacDonald, Bob Odenkirk, Tim & Eric, Chelsea Peretti, Nick Swardson, Nathan Fielder, Oliver Tree, Toby Radloff, and Mike Krol.

=== First iteration (2007–2008) ===
All listed video series from December 16, 2008. Many of these series have made their way to individual YouTube channels, acquired by other networks, or evolved into larger shows.

- (Layers)
- Adventures With The Ambersons
- All My Exes
- Belzervizion
- Black Supaman
- Bobby's Beautiful Bed & Breakfast
- Bobby-Q
- Boxland
- Bronx World Travelers
- Cakey!
- Can't Sleep
- Chasing Donovan
- Children's Guide To Growing Up
- China, IL
- Chunklet Invades Austin
- Chunklet T.N.A. - Rolling Deep
- Comedy by the Numbers
- Country Public Broadcasting System
- Crazy Ass Mofo
- Curious Crackhead
- Cat's in Pajamas
- Danger Squad Action Kickass Team
- David Neher's Homemade Show
- DCLugi TV
- Derek and Simon: The Show
- Diary Of A Lonely DJ, The
- Doing His Best James Dean
- Fark TV
- Formaldehyde Theatre
- Freddy Lockhart's Mixed Media
- Good Side Of Bad News
- Grandma's Inter-web Show
- Hawaiian Tropic
- I Am Baby Cakes
- I Hate My Roommates
- Inhuman Resources
- Kill Me Now
- Killer Mike's Grind Time Sports Show Bang! Bang! Bang!
- Kinda Like News
- Kitten vs. Newborn
- Life 101
- Little Michael Jackson And Me
- Making Friends with Chelsea Peretti
- Maria Bamford Show
- Mater P Theatre
- Maximus Puss
- Miss Artemis: Pet Regressor
- Norm MacDonald Presents: The Fake News
- Party Animals
- Penelope Princess of Pets
- Position of the Day
- Powerloafing
- Psych Ward
- Real Scientific
- Robots vs. Dragons
- Sam's Home
- Scream Engine IV
- Sexus
- Sourced Out
- Space Talk From Dimension Eugene
- Standrea
- Subconscious Channel
- Super Amazing Innovations
- Super Deluxe Newsletter
- Super Deluxe Podcasts
- The Freeloader's Guide To Easy Living
- The Hands Of God
- The Law Of The Jungle
- The Littlest Panther
- The Post Show
- The Professor Brothers
- The Snuz Brothers
- The Ted Zone
- The Wayne & Toby Show
- This Is Now
- Tim and Eric Nite Live!
- Tim And Eric Not Live
- Time Suck
- Too Soon?
- Treasure Trail
- Ulysses S. Grant
- Viral Vidiocy
- W's World
- What's Your Story?
- Whiskers and Mr. Fancy
- Y'all So Stupid
- You Asked For It

=== Revived iteration (2015–2018) ===
==== Series ended when Super Deluxe was closed ====
- Cheap Thrills (2017–2018)
- Memesplaining (2018)
- Sex Stuff (2018)
- Thrift Haul with Fat Tony (2017–2018)
- On Blast (2018)
- Animefit9000 with Caleon Fox (2018)
- Free 4 Me (2018)
- Robot Takeover (2018)
- Food Land (2018)

==== Former series ====
- AnimeFit 9000 (2018)
- Caring (2016)
- Dark Day (2016)
- David (2016)
- Disengaged (2015–2016)
- Fridays (2016)
- Future You (2016)
- Kick Me (2018)
- Magic Funhouse! (2016; moved to Fullscreen)
- Mind Jack (2016)
- Riders (2016)
- Total Hack (2018)
- Turnt Beauty (2016–2018)
- Xtra Sauce (2018)
- YoMeryl’s Panic Attacks (2017)

==== Produced television series ====
- Chambers
- This Close
- Don't Hug Me I'm Scared (unaired TV pilot)
