= Brad Neely =

American comic book artist (born 1976)

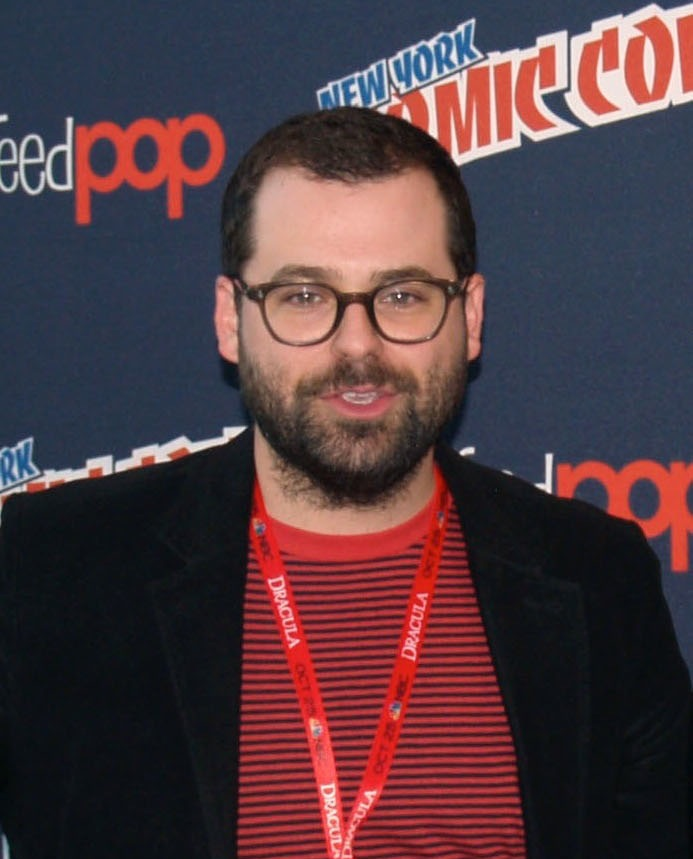
- Neely at the 2013 New York Comic Con
- Born: October 26, 1976 (age 49); Fort Smith, Arkansas, U.S.
- Occupations: Comic book artist; writer; producer; composer; voice actor
- Notable work: China, IL

Brad Neely (born October 26, 1976) is an American comic book artist, writer, producer, composer, and voice actor known for his work on television series such as South Park, China, IL and Brad Neely's Harg Nallin' Sclopio Peepio, the web series I Am Baby Cakes and The Professor Brothers, and Wizard People, Dear Reader.

== Career ==
=== Wizard People, Dear Reader ===
Neely wrote and recorded the Harry Potter spoof Wizard People, Dear Reader in 2003. This audio track replaces the audio for the movie Harry Potter and the Philosopher's Stone, to be played along with the images but rewriting the story, such as making Harry Potter a drunkard. Neely says that the project idea came while in a bar; he and his friends were watching a man wearing headphones and guessing what he was listening to, and Neely began improvising scenes from an imaginary Harry Potter book on tape. According to the Arkansas Times, "as the story nears its end, the narrator increasingly confuses the plot to the point that you begin to wonder if he's paying attention."

After making copies for friends and posting it on the internet, it attained an underground following. It was played at the New York Underground Film Festival, reviewed in the New York Times, and discussed in Salon; Neely also performed live versions. Shows in the East Coast were cancelled after Warner Bros., the owner of the original film, said that if the shows went ahead, the venues hosting could never show any Warner Bros. films again.

Neely is included in the documentary We Are Wizards, a documentary that looks at Harry Potter fans and the musical acts inspired by the novels.

=== Video and television ===
==== Early work ====
Neely is the creator of the animation Cox & Combes' Washington. A rap-filled revisionist take on George Washington, it was included in Spike & Mike's Sick and Twisted Festival of Animation 2007. A reviewer for the Chicago Reader called it "a real find", and it was popular online.

Neely was a writer for the animated series South Park in 2007 and 2009. He has also produced America Now, a 12-part series of 30-second musical shorts for Adult Swim, which was made available on the channel's website.

==== Work set in China, Illinois ====
Neely has created three web animation series set in the fictional town of China, Illinois: I Am Baby Cakes, The Professor Brothers, and China, IL. Baby Cakes shorts are typically in the style of diary entries narrated in the first person by Mark "Baby" Cakes, a philosophical and possibly mentally ill 30-year-old man. The Professor Brothers follows the professional and personal misadventures of Frank and Steve Smith, two brothers who are professors at a local community college whose mascot is a panda bear. China, IL interweaves the two stories, as Baby Cakes falls in love with Frank's recently dead girlfriend after finding her diary, and the two men attempt to come to terms with their emotional pain upon learning of her death.

China, IL was adapted into a TV series of the same name by Cartoon Network and Adult Swim. On May 5, 2008, Super Deluxe began releasing a four-part mini-series by Neely entitled China, IL. The site published an installment once a week, culminating on May 25 with a broadcast of the entire series as one 11-minute episode on Adult Swim. The show was the first original Brad Neely work to be shown on television. On May 23, 2011, Adult Swim announced that China, IL would be one of the new full-length premieres for the fall line-up with Neely having creative and executive producer credits. The first episode was broadcast on October 2, 2011, on Adult Swim. The series ran for three seasons and the last episode, "Magical Pet", aired on June 14, 2015.

==== Later work ====
Neely's second series for Adult Swim, Brad Neely's Harg Nallin' Sclopio Peepio, was announced in May 2015. It was canceled after one season.

In January 2020 it was reported that CBS All Access had ordered an animated comedy series titled The Harper House developed by Neely and Katie Krentz. In October 2020, the cast was announced, including Rhea Seehorn, Jason Lee, Tatiana Maslany and Ryan Flynn as the Harper family.

=== Comics and writing ===
Neely's began the comic series "Creased Comics", a single-paneled comic, in 1996. The Arkansas Times, in a 2007 article, called the style "purposefully crude" and said that "the comics are far from obvious—sometimes head-scratchingly far—but when he's at his best, Neely could be our generation's answer to Gary Larson." Creased Comics ran in the Portland Mercury, starting in 2013. In 2007, Creased Comics was available online, but now links to Neely's other projects.

Neely published his first novel, a parody biography titled You, Me, and Ulysses S. Grant, in 2024. He had begun working on a novel about the Civil War as early as 2007. When asked about it at an event at the Alamo Drafthouse in Austin, Texas, said, "I realized about 500 pages in that it wasn't that funny", and said that he was no longer planning on releasing the book. In a November 2013 Q&A session on Reddit, Neely said, "I work on this book every day. It's become a problem."

== Personal life ==
Brad Neely is originally from Fort Smith, Arkansas. He came from a religious background, which he described as "low-hanging fruit for irreverent comedy". When asked about his beliefs in 2013 he said, "Jury's out, man. I mean, it's impossible to say either way." Neely briefly attended the Pennsylvania Academy of the Fine Arts. He lived in Austin, Texas for ten years, and as of 2013 was living in Los Angeles.
