= 1816 in poetry =

Nationality words link to articles with information on the nation's poetry or literature (for instance, Irish or France).

== Events ==
- This year is known as the "Year Without a Summer" after Mount Tambora had erupted in the Dutch East Indies the previous year and cast enough ash into the atmosphere to block out the sun and cause abnormal weather across much of Northern Europe and the Northeastern United States. This pall of darkness inspires Byron to write his poem "Darkness" in July.
- Lord Byron separates from his wife and in April leaves England to tour continental Europe (never returning), settling in the summer in Switzerland, at the Villa Diodati by Lake Geneva; in late May he meets, and soon becomes friends with, the poet Percy Bysshe Shelley, and Shelley's wife-to-be Mary Godwin. Regular conversation with Byron has an invigorating effect on Shelley's poetry. While on a boating tour the two take together, Shelley is inspired to write his Hymn to Intellectual Beauty. Shelley, in turn, influences Byron's poetry. This new influence shows itself in the third part of Childe Harold's Pilgrimage, which Byron is working on, as well as in Manfred, which he writes in the autumn of this year.
- In late August Percy Bysshe Shelley and Mary Wollstonecraft Godwin return to England from Switzerland, taking with them some of Byron's manuscripts for his publisher.
- Shelley is introduced to John Keats in Hampstead towards the end of the year by their mutual friend, Leigh Hunt, who is to transfer his enthusiasm from Keats to Shelley.
- December 30 — Shelley marries his mistress Mary Wollstonecraft Godwin in London following the suicides on October 9 of her half-sister, Fanny Imlay (by laudanum in Swansea), and on December 10 of his pregnant estranged first wife, Harriet (by drowning in The Serpentine).

== Works published ==
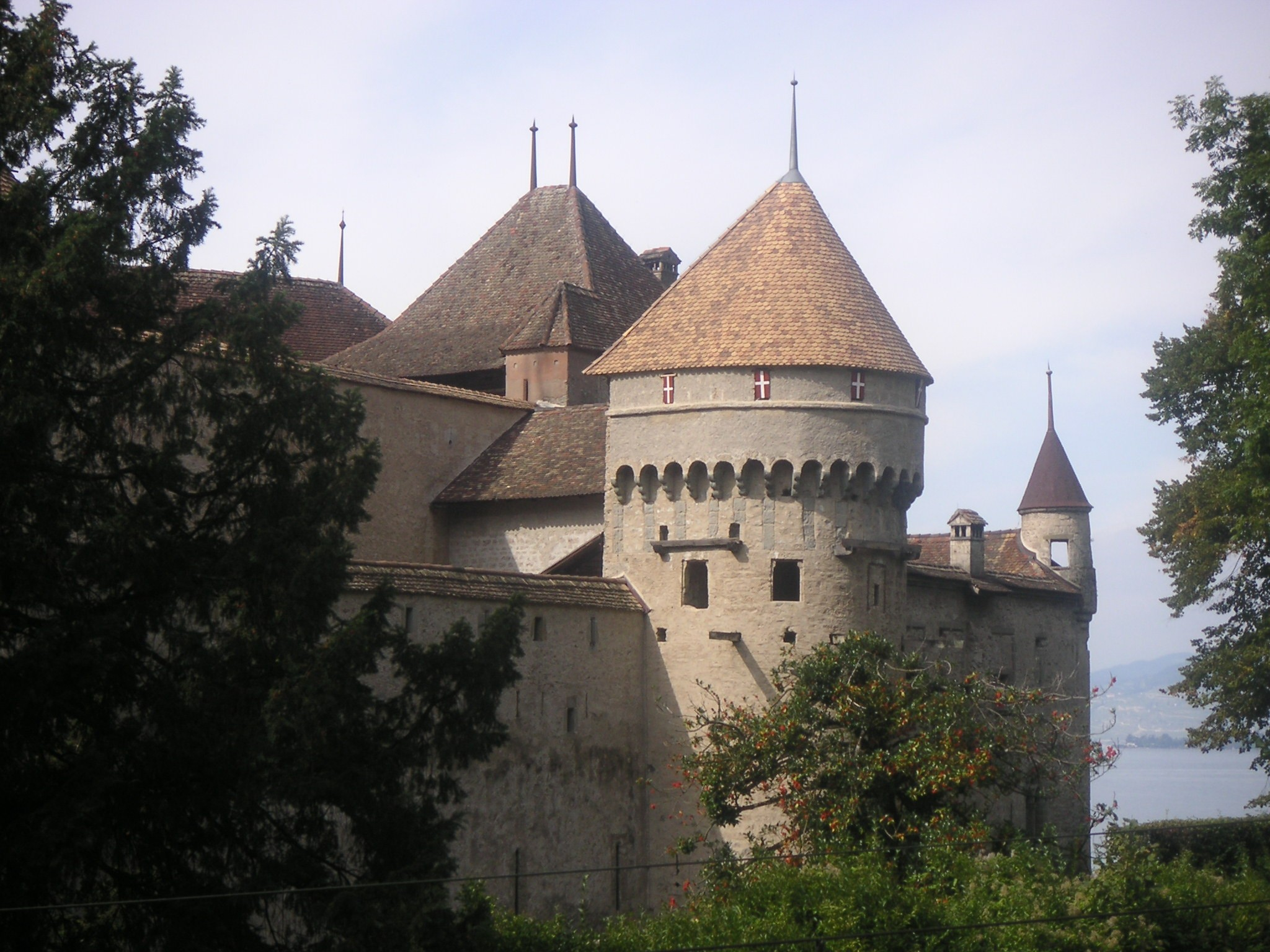
Château de Chillon where much of The Prisoner of Chillon takes place

=== United Kingdom ===
- Eaton Stannard Barrett, The Talents Run Mad; or, Eighteen Hundred and Sixteen
- Mary Matilda Betham, The Lay of Marie
- Thomas Brown, The Wanderer in Norway
- Lord Byron (listed in chronological order of publication):
  - February 13: Parisina published together with The Siege of Corinth
  - April 14: A Sketch from Private Life, about the separation from his wife, Augusta; printed for private circulation; unauthorized publication in The Champion on April 14 of this year
  - April 14: "Fare Thee Well" like A Sketch, about the separation from his wife, also published without authorization in The Champion
  - September 16: Monody on the Death of the Right Honorouble R. B. Sheriden, written at the request of Douglas Kinnaird; spoken at Drury Lane Theatre by Mrs. Maria Davison on this date
  - November 18: Childe Harold's Pilgrimage, Part III; the publisher is able to sell 7,000 copies of both this work and The Prisoner of Chillon, and Other Poems to booksellers at a dinner in December.
  - December 5: The Prisoner of Chillon, and Other Poems
  - Poems
  - "The Dream"
  - "Prometheus"
  - Darkness (inspired by the darkness of this year, see above)
  - Manfred (completed and published 1817)

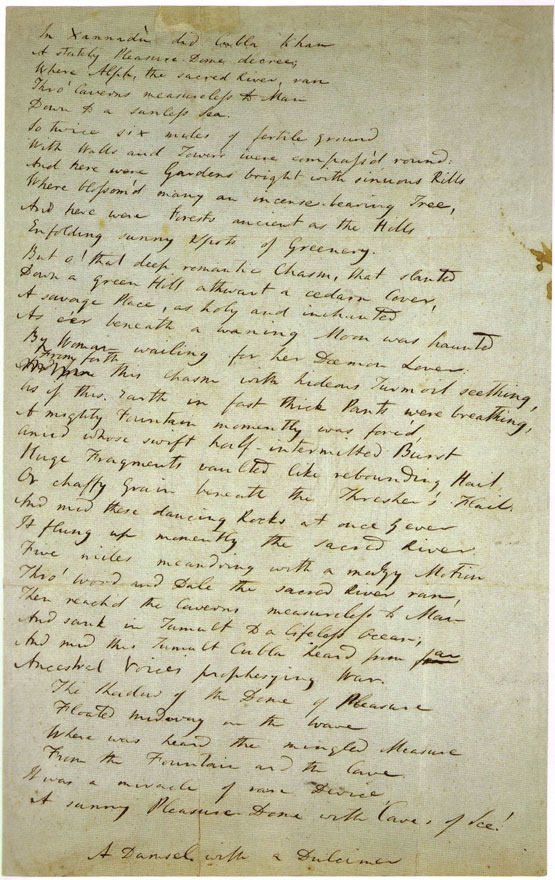
Draft of "Kubla Khan" by Samuel Taylor Coleridge: written 1797; first published 1816

- Samuel Taylor Coleridge, Christabel; Kubla Khan: A Vision; The Pains of Sleep, including "Christabel" and "Kubla Khan" (May 25)
- Jane Ellis, Cerddi, Welsh, first published Welsh language book by a woman
- James Hogg:
  - Mador of the Moor
  - The Poetic Mirror; or, The Living Bards of Britain, published anonymously; has parodies of William Wordsworth, S. T. Coleridge and Robert Southey
- Leigh Hunt, Story of Rimini
- Hannah More, Poems
- Edward Quillinan, The Sacrifice of Isabel
- 'Quiz', illustrated by Thomas Rowlandson, The Grand Master, or Adventures of Qui Hi in Hindostan: a hudibrastic poem in eight cantos
- J. H. Reynolds, The Naiad, with Other Poems, published anonymously
- Percy Bysshe Shelley, Alastor; or, The Spirit of Solitude; and Other Poems (including "Alastor, or The Spirit of Solitude"), published in March
- John Keats, "On First Looking into Chapman's Homer"
- Robert Southey:
  - The Lay of the Laureate: Carmen nuptiale, written for the marriage of Princess Charlotte; a privately printed edition with the title Carmen Nuptiale is also published this year
  - The Poet's Pilgrimage to Waterloo
- John Wilson, The City of the Plague, and Other Poems
- William Wordsworth, Thanksgiving Ode, January 18, 1816

=== United States ===
- Joseph Rodman Drake, "The Culprit Fay", a 600-line poem about a fairy who falls in love with a mortal maiden in the Hudson Valley; republished in 1835 in The Culprit Fay and Other Poems
- John Neal, earliest poetry published in The Portico volumes 1 and 2
- John Pierpont, The Airs of Palestine, a popular long poem which quickly went through three editions; traces the influence of music on Jewish history and praises sacred music; written while the author was a Baltimore shopkeeper, the popular poem gains him a reputation as one of the best American poets of his time
- Lydia Sigourney, using the pen name "Lydia Huntley", Moral pieces, in Prose and Verse, Hartford, Connecticut: Sheldon & Goodwin
- Alexander Wilson, Poems, Chiefly in the Scottish Dialect, poems and a biographical essay on the author's life, posthumously published

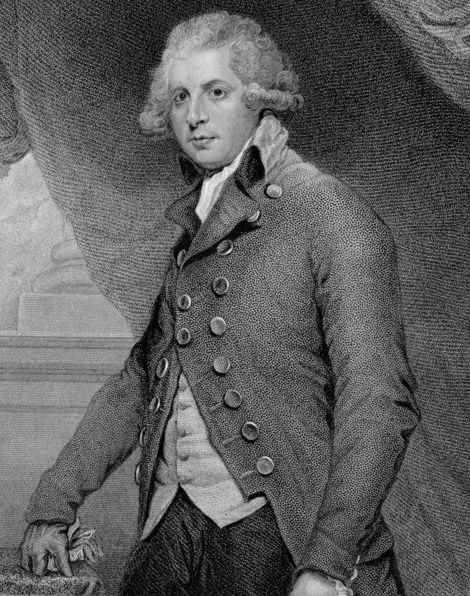
Richard Brinsley Sheridan dies this year aged 64

== Births ==
Death years link to the corresponding "[year] in poetry" article:

- January 16 – Frances Browne (died 1879), Irish poet
- February 18 – Ferdinand Dugué (died 1913), French poet and playwright
- April 21 – Charlotte Brontë (died 1855), English novelist and poet
- April 22 – Philip James Bailey (died 1902), English Spasmodic poet
- April 23 – Douglas Smith Huyghue (died 1891), Canadian and Australian poet, fiction writer, essayist and artist
- April 29 – (Charles William) Shirley Brooks (died 1874), English journalist and poet
- May 2 – Charles Heavysege (died 1876), English-born Canadian poet and dramatist
- August 31 – Josiah D. Canning, born Josiah Dean Cannon (died 1892), American poet
- October 26 – Philip Pendleton Cooke (died 1850), American lawyer and poet

== Deaths ==
Birth years link to the corresponding "[year] in poetry" article:

- June 16 – Hugh Henry Brackenridge (born 1748), American writer, poet, lawyer, judge and Pennsylvania Supreme Court justice
- July 7 – Richard Brinsley Sheridan (born 1751), Irish playwright, Whig statesman, writer and poet
- October 27 – Santō Kyōden 山東京伝, pen name of Samuru Iwase 岩瀬醒, also known popularly as "Kyōya Denzō" 京屋伝蔵 (born 1761), Japanese Edo period poet, writer and artist; brother of Santō Kyōzan

== See also ==
- Poetry
- 19th century in literature
- 19th century in poetry
- List of years in poetry
- List of years in literature
- List of poets
- Golden Age of Russian Poetry (1800–1850)
- Romantic poetry
- Weimar Classicism period in Germany, commonly considered to have begun in 1788 and to have ended either in 1805, with the death of Friedrich Schiller, or 1832, with the death of Goethe
