= Christabel =

Christabel may refer to:

- Christabel (poem), a lengthy poem by Samuel Taylor Coleridge
  - Christabel (film), a 2001 experimental feature by James Fotopoulos based on the poem
  - Christabel, a 1998 lesbian Gothic romance novel by Karin Kallmaker inspired by the Samuel Taylor Coleridge poem
- Christabel (TV series), a 1988 British drama by Dennis Potter, about an English woman married to a German lawyer in Nazi Germany
- Christabel LaMotte, a character in the novel Possession: A Romance
- 2695 Christabel (1979 UE), a main-belt asteroid discovered in 1979
- Lake Christabel, a small lake of New Zealand
- USS Christabel (SP-162), a United States Navy patrol vessel of World War I

== See also ==
- Christabel (given name)
