= Hans Franz Nägeli =

Swiss politician

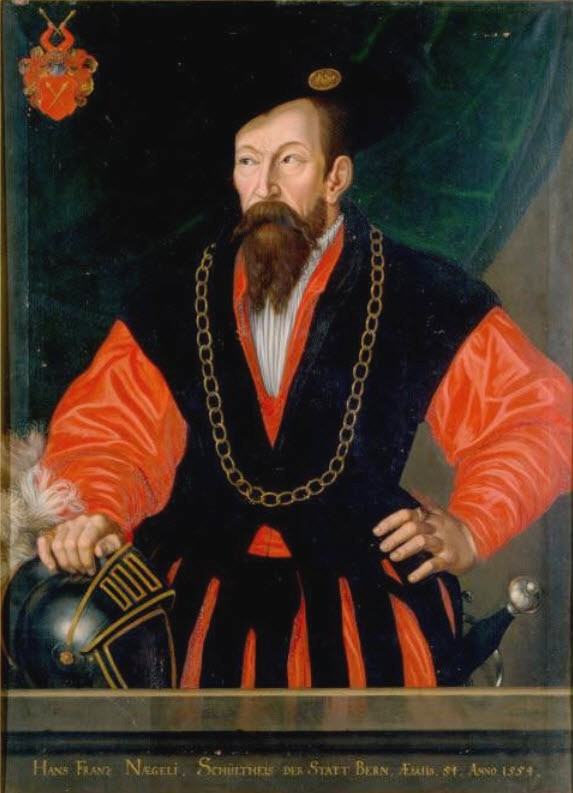
Anonymous portrait, 1554 (Burgerbibliothek of Berne)

Hans Franz Nägeli (c. 1497 – 9 January 1579) was a Swiss politician, military leader and diplomat who was a prominent force in Bern for four decades. He captained the Bernese forces in the campaigns against the forces of the condottiero Gian Giacomo Medici, and the campaign in Valais during the Second War of Kappel. Nägeli is best known for leading the Bernese conquest of Vaud from the Duchy of Savoy in 1536, and also campaigned against the Bishop of Lausanne to free François Bonivard from Chillon Castle. He was the Schultheiß of Bern from 1540 to 1568.

== Biography ==
Nägeli was born around 1497 in Aigle, then in the canton of Bern, into a Bernese patrician family. He was the son of Hans Rudolf Nägeli, the governor of Aigle, and Elisabeth Sommer. His father, who later became a mercenary in Papal and French service, was killed at the Battle of Bicocca in 1522.

Following his father's footsteps, Nägeli became a mercenary and commanded three hundred Bernese troops in Papal service in 1521. He entered the Grand Council of Bern in 1522 and its Small Council in 1529. Nägeli served as Schultheiß (chief magistrate) of Burgdorf from 1525 to 1529, as treasurer of Bern from 1533 to 1540, and as the city's Schultheiß from 1540 to 1568, being elected for a two-year mandate every four years. As a captain in the Bernese army during the Second Musso War, Nägeli expelled the condottiero Gian Giacomo Medici from the Valtellina in 1531. That same year, with 2,000 soldiers, he guarded the border with Valais as part of the Second War of Kappel.

In 1536, Nägeli was made commander-in-chief of the Bernese army during the encirclement of the Republic of Geneva by Charles III, Duke of Savoy. At the head of 6,000 men, he invaded the Savoyard barony of Vaud on 22 January 1536. By 26 February, Nägeli had occupied Moudon, Nyon, and the Pays de Gex almost without a fight, relieved Geneva, and taken Morges, Orbe, and Yverdon. He captured Chillon and Lausanne between 20 March and 21 April. On behalf of Bern's councils, Nägeli appointed Vaud's first Bernese Landvogtei in May 1536, among them his brothers Sebastian at Lausanne and Hans Rudolf at Thonon.

Nägeli's diplomatic career was equally accomplished: he mediated between Geneva and Savoy, and represented Bernese interests at the Federal Diet, in the Catholic towns, in Geneva on several occasions and before King Francis I in Paris in 1537. He participated in peace negotiations in Lausanne from 1563 to 1564, during which Bern, fearing Spanish intervention and at the urging of the other Swiss cantons, returned the Pays de Gex and Thonon to Savoy. Nägeli, who had converted to Protestantism in 1526, promoted the Reformation from 1529, notably in Murten, Neuchâtel, Payerne, and Avenches, and persecuted the Anabaptists. He owned houses on Gerechtigkeitsgasse and today's Nägeligasse in the Old City of Bern, as well as property in Vaud. Nägeli died in Bern on 9 January 1579.
