= Bonnivard =

Bonnivard is a surname. Notable people with the surname include:

- Émilie Bonnivard (born 1980), French politician
- François Bonivard (or Bonnivard) (1493–1570), French politician, nobleman, ecclesiastic, and historian
