= The Prisoner of Chillon (painting) =

Painting by Eugène Delacroix

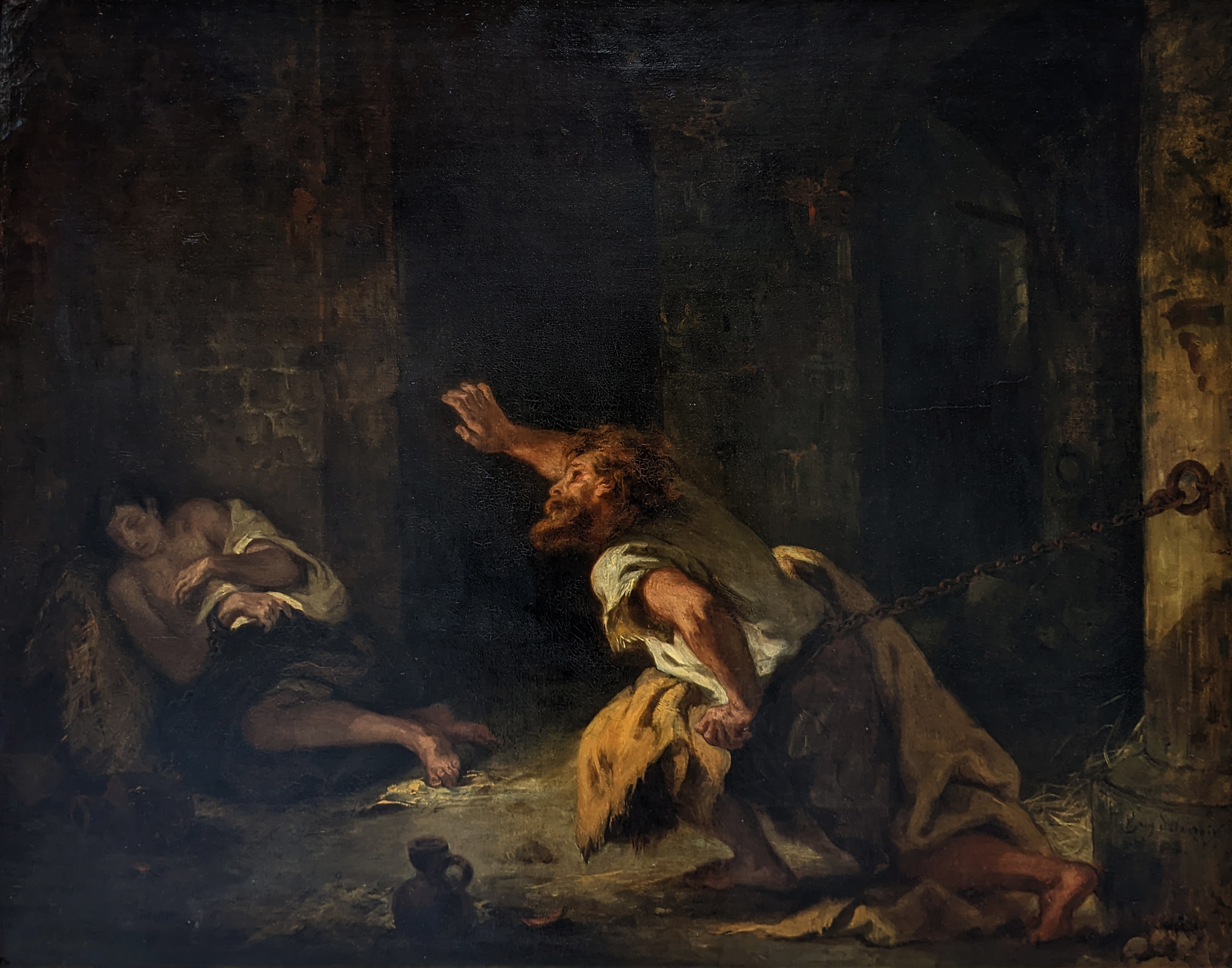
- Artist: Eugène Delacroix
- Year: 1834
- Type: Oil on canvas, history painting
- Dimensions: 73.5 cm × 92.5 cm (28.9 in × 36.4 in)
- Location: Louvre; Paris

The Prisoner of Chillon (French: Le Prisonnier de Chillon) is an 1834 oil painting by the French artist Eugène Delacroix. It depicts a scene from the 1816 poem of the same title by the British writer Lord Byron set in the sixteenth century. It portrays the Swiss hero François Bonivard chained in a dungeon of Chillon Castle, straining to reach out towards his younger brother.

It was exhibited at the Salon of 1835 at the Louvre in Paris. It received a mixed reception, but generally admired for its brushwork and energy. It is now in the collection of the Louvre, having been acquired in 1906.

== Bibliography ==
- Allard, Sébastien; Fabre, Côme (2018). Delacroix. Metropolitan Museum of Art.
- Alston, Isabella (2014). Delacroix. TAJ Books International.
- Davies, Elspeth (1994). Portrait of Delacroix. Pentland Press.
- Johnson, Lee (1981). The Paintings of Eugène Delacroix: A Critical Catalogue, 1816–1831. Vol. 3. Clarendon Press.
