= Prometheus (Byron poem) =

1816 poem by Lord Byron

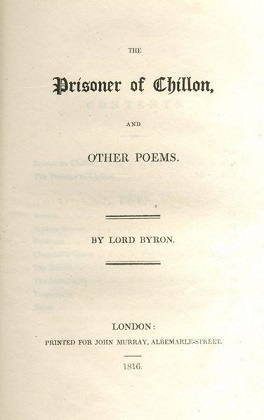
- 1816 first edition title page.
- Author: Lord Byron
- Original title: 'The Prisoner of Chillon, and Other Poems'
- Language: English
- Genre: Poetry, Literature
- Publisher: John Murray
- Publication date: 1816
- Publication place: London
- Media type: Book
- Pages: 60

"Prometheus" is a poem by the English Romantic poet Lord Byron, first published in 1816 by John Murray in The Prisoner of Chillon, and Other Poems collection. The poem is an encomium to Prometheus, a Titan in Greek mythology, who stole fire from the gods to help humanity. The poem focuses on resisting tyranny by making individual sacrifices.

The character of Prometheus mirrors Byron's own image of the hero, known as the "Byronic hero", a solitary, defiant, suffering rebel. His example is meant to empower people to act. Revolutions occur when individuals defy or reject the status quo and imagine a different future. He acts as a catalyst for change.

Byron himself fought in the Greek War for Independence in an attempt to achieve revolutionary change in his own lifetime.

== Background ==
While vacationing together in 1816 (the "year without a summer") at the Villa Diodati in Switzerland, Byron and Percy Bysshe Shelley became heavily influenced by the Prometheus myth.

Percy Bysshe Shelley translated part of Aeschylus's Prometheus Bound (Prometheus Desmotes) for Lord Byron.

Shelley worked on translating the Greek tragedy Prometheus Bound in July 1816. The theme of a hero defying and resisting a tyrannical despot appealed to both Byron and Shelley. Shelley dictated the translation to his later wife Mary.

Inspired by the same themes and conversations, Byron wrote his own poem titled "Prometheus" in July 1816.

Shelley later wrote his own lyrical drama, Prometheus Unbound (1820), based on the myth. Frankenstein; or, The Modern Prometheus (1818), also relied on the same myth.

German Romantic writers such as Johann Wolfgang Goethe, Friedrich Schlegel, and August Wilhelm Schlegel had earlier explored the theme of the Prometheus myth in Romanticism. Byron and Shelley made it central to English Romanticism.

Prometheus is depicted as a Byronic hero, defiant, proud, and sacrificing for a higher cause. The ancient Greek myth of Prometheus centered on his stealing of fire from Zeus, fire being a symbol of creativity and civilization, to help humanity. As a result, he was punished and had to endure eternal torment and pain.

The poem focuses on his suffering and strength of will, instead of highlighting the theft of fire. The poem describes Prometheus' "silent suffering, and intense" and his defiant "will" against "the deaf tyranny of Fate".

It was written in a period of Byron's life after his separation from his wife and his forced departure and exile from England. It was a pessimistic and troubled point in his life. He saw himself as a lonely and persecuted victim, much like Prometheus, defying society and authoritarian power.

The poem had political symbolism representing defiance and resistance to absolute monarchs and tyrannical rules spearheaded by Romantic poets. Prometheus became an avatar or model for resistance and defiance, a firebrand for the age. Both Byron and Shelley perceived the image and example of Prometheus as one that was a metaphor for what they themselves sought to accomplish. Prometheus's struggle "between the suffering and the will" means that he must choose between what is easy and what is right. But to choose what is right entails sacrifice and suffering and loss.

Prometheus was a Titan, a god from Greek mythology who ruled the world before the rise of the Olympians. He incurred the wrath and punishment of Zeus by helping mankind because he saw it as doing the right thing. It was against his own interests. Zeus was known as the Thunderer, the king of the gods, the god of the sky and weather, who used a lightning bolt as his weapon. He chose to battle for the freedom of humans but it was not an easy decision. His will triumphed over fear and danger. He relied on a principled stand although he knew the dangers involved. The poem is an encomium to Prometheus' courage. It emphasizes the value of individual sacrifices to achieve liberty for everyone.

== Summary ==
The poem begins with the speaker acknowledging first "the sufferings of mortality" and then "the rock, the vulture, and the chain" that Prometheus faced as his punishment for helping mankind. He sought to distinguish between humanity's collective suffering under the gods and Prometheus' suffering after he helped them, an individual suffering. He made the decision to sacrifice himself to free mankind.

Prometheus was guided by inner conviction and principle to alleviate human suffering under "the ruling principle of Hate" when his values forced him to "render less ... The sum of human wretchedness." He understood that he had the chance and the power to act for the benefit of mankind. To ignore their suffering would go against all his beliefs and betray his own values. Prometheus also knew what the consequences of giving fire to mankind would be: "The fate [he] didst so well foresee" was a future where he was chained to a rock, but mortals were free to "strengthen [themselves] with [their] own mind": "The fate that thou didst so well foresee/ But would not to appease him tell." He made the decision to sacrifice himself for the benefit of all mankind.

Prometheus had to reject the easy choice in favor of what he knew was right. Prometheus is described as "baffled" by the choice he had to make because it would result in "wretchedness", "resistance", and a "sad, unallied existence." He understood that if he helped mankind his own fate would be decided, a life of misery and suffering. Knowing this, he , nevertheless, chose to succor humanity.

Zeus punished Prometheus for his brazen act of defiance and resistance as he had predicted. He endured intense suffering but did not break under the cruel punishment. He was strengthened by "patience", "endurance", "a firm will", and "a deep sense": "Still in thy patient energy,/ In the endurance, and repulse/ Of thine impenetrable Spirit." He took great pride in his sacrifice for mankind. He was convinced of the value of his heroic stand against Zeus' unbounded tyranny. He remained silent under excruciating torture because he believed that his cause was right.

== Themes ==
The focus of the poem is on tyranny, rebellion, and empowerment. The poem pays homage to the enduring spirit of rebellion and defiance of Prometheus. In the Greek myth, he stole fire from the gods and gave it to mankind. Zeus, the most powerful Olympian god, punished Prometheus for this sacrilege by sentencing him to being chained for eternity to a rock. A vulture would arrive every day and eat his liver.

Zeus is portrayed as a tyrant who oppressed and dominated, relying on fear and ignorance as the basis of his arbitrary power and dictatorial rule. The analogy is with the kings and monarchs who ruled in Byron's own day. The British monarchy was the target of his attacks. Byron uses the mythological Prometheus to celebrate the resistance and rejection of authority seen as tyrannical and oppressive, using his example as an avatar and symbol, a metaphor for reform, rebellion, and revolution.

Prometheus had been motivated to help mankind by witnessing "the sufferings of mortality", by seeing the tyrannical and oppressive rule of the gods with his own eyes. Zeus's reign was harsh and cruel for mankind. Indeed, Zeus was a scourge and enslaver of humanity. His reign is characterized as "inexorable Heaven," "the deaf tyranny of Fate," and "the ruling principle of Hate": "Which torture where they cannot kill;/ And the inexorable Heaven,/ And the deaf tyranny of Fate,/ The ruling principle of Hate."

He drew the parallel to the rule of monarchs in Europe and the rest of the world in his day. Mankind needed to be inspired and awakened to revolt and to rebel. A change was needed but someone had to spark it. And that was the role Prometheus was to play. Zeus created humans so he could enjoy watching them suffer and die: "Which for its pleasure doth create/ The things it may annihilate." He was an arbitrary and oppressive tyrant.

Prometheus is a benefactor and liberator of humanity. He is seen as a traitor to the gods because by helping mankind he diminished the power or control gods have over mankind. Humans achieved independence and freedom from their oppressors. His "crime" was to be "kind", to reduce human misery, to "strengthen Man with his own mind" by giving men fire: "To render with thy precepts less/ The sum of human wretchedness,/ And strengthen Man with his own mind."

Fire is a symbol for knowledge and enlightenment. Prometheus empowered men by giving them knowledge and by freeing them from their bondage and servitude to the gods.

At the close of the second stanza, the power relations between Zeus and Prometheus change. In Prometheus' "Silence" was Zeus's "Sentence": "And in thy Silence was his Sentence,/ And in his Soul a vain repentance,/ And evil dread so ill dissembled."

Zeus could physically punish and restrain and limit Prometheus. But his defiance and inner conviction of being in the right ultimately weakened and even undermined or undercut the power of Zeus. Prometheus had the moral upper hand. Zeus saw by his defiance that Prometheus was a threat and a danger, his silence was the ultimate defiance to Zeus. Zeus then began to feel "a vain repentance" and "an evil dread" that caused his lightning bolt to tremble, the weapon he used to rule gods and to terrorize mortals. Zeus feared the power represented by Prometheus' rebellion to such an extent that his faith in his own power began to weaken. The poem asserts that rebellion itself is a form of power, that defiance and resistance diminish the power of a tyrant. Resistance itself can lessen the power of an oppressive ruler.

In the third stanza, the poem emphasizes that the figure of Prometheus is crucial as "a symbol and a sign": "A mighty lesson we inherit:/ Thou art a symbol and a sign/ To Mortals of their fate and force." His example is intended to empower everyone. Like Prometheus, men and women are capable of patience, endurance, and of possessing an "impenetrable Spirit." Mortals have the traits as he does, which will allow then to achieve liberty and freedom and need not suffer under tyrants and oppressors. They can achieve their own liberation if they inspired by a heroic example, such as that of Prometheus.

The poem concludes with the human spirit being ultimately rewarded for its suffering, in triumph, "triumphant where it dares defy." Like Prometheus, humans possess all the qualities that enable them to rebel and resist against the "funereal destiny" imposed upon them by their tyrants and oppressive rulers. The poem closes with the achievement of "Victory", "making Death a Victory", that a struggle for a noble and just cause is a victory in itself that death cannot destroy or negate.

The work is significant because it made the Prometheus myth a dominant motif of literary Romanticism of that era. Both Byron and Shelley relied on the Promethean ideal in their works.

The work helped to transform the myth into an enduring metaphor for resistance to tyranny and the sacrifices needed to attain it.

== Sources ==
- Kuluşaklı, Emine, and Ferit Şahin. "Prometheus Myth In The Poems Of Lord Byron And Can Yücel." İnönü Üniversitesi Kültür ve Sanat Dergisi 7.1 (2021): 162-169.
- Cooper, Andrew M. "Chains, Pains, and Tentative Gains: The Byronic Prometheus in the Summer of 1816." Studies in Romanticism (1988): 529-550.
- Dennis, Ian. "'Making Death a Victory': Victimhood and Power in Byron's 'Prometheus' and 'The Prisoner of Chillon'." Keats-Shelley Journal 50 (2001): 144-161.
- Hijiya, Yukihito. "Byron and the new Promethean man." (1971). https://digitalrepository.unm.edu/engl_etds/453
- Marchionni, Francesco. "'And Making Death a Victory’: Scepticism and Personal Conflict in 'Childe Harold’s Pilgrimage' I–II and 'Prometheus'." The Byron Journal 48.1 (2020): 45-56.
- Muslim, Hibbe Moussadak. "Prometheus as a Mythological Hero: A Comparison between Byron’s Poem 'Prometheus' (1816) and Miller’s Novel Circe (2018)." Uruk for Humanities 17.2 (2024): 24.
- Stubbs, Irene. Prometheus Lucifer: the revival of the true myth of Prometheus by Byron and Shelley. New York University, 1982.
- Yu, Jie-Ae. "The Problem of Promethean Will." The Byron Journal 31 (2003): 77-83.
- Goslee, Nancy. "Pure Stream from a Troubled Source: Byron, Schlegel and Prometheus." The Byron Journal 10 (1982): 20-37.
- Raizis, Marius. "Byron's Promethean Rebellion in 1816: Fictionality and Self-Projection in His Poetry of that Year." The Byron Journal 19 (1991): 41-52.
