= Villa Zina =

Historic villa in Vevey, Switzerland

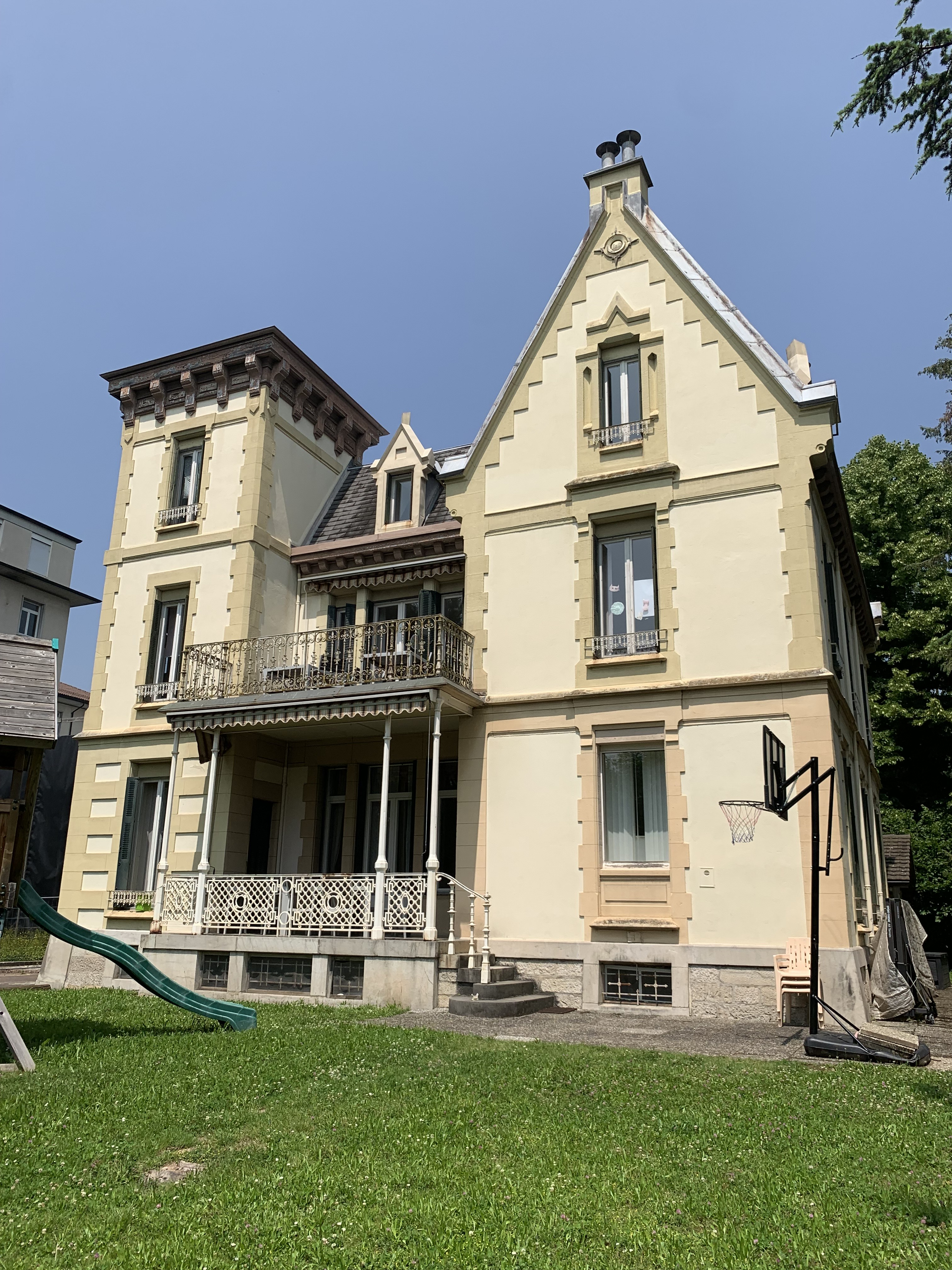

General information
- Architectural style: Historicist, neo-gothic
- Location: Vevey, Canton of Vaud, Switzerland, Bd Paderewski 3, 1800 Vevey
- Coordinates: 46°27′39″N 6°51′17″E
- Construction started: 1877
- Completed: 1878
- Owner: Private ownership (since 2020; previously Fondation des hôpitaux de la Riviera)

Technical details
- Floor area: 412 sqm

Design and construction
- Architects: Charles Nicati, Ernest Burnat

The Villa Zina (formerly Villa Montgomery) is a historic villa located in Vevey, in the Canton of Vaud, Switzerland. Constructed between 1877 and 1878, it was registered in 1995 as a Cultural Property of Regional Significance (Class 2) in the Swiss Inventory of Cultural Property.

Originally a private residence, it later served as an administrative hub for the Hôpital Riviera-Chablais (HRC) before being sold in 2020 and is currently used by the Fondation Enfance Emma Couvreu.

== History ==
The Villa Zina was built between 1877 and 1878 according to the plans of architects Charles Nicati and Ernest Burnat for Auguste Mayor, a Swiss businessman. It later served as the spring residence of Russian princess Vera Lobanoff (born Princess Dolgorouky), nicknamed "la Princesse aux bijoux" (the Princess of Jewels), until her death in 1914. In 1924, a minor fire broke out in the villa's outbuildings, though damage was limited.

Since 1963, the villa was owned by the Fondation des hôpitaux de la Riviera, which used it to house administrative services for the Hôpital Riviera-Chablais (HRC), including the hospital's directorate. Its proximity to the Samaritain Hospital in Vevey—which has since closed—made it a convenient annex for hospital operations during that period.

In 2020, as part of the consolidation of HRC services into the new Centre hospitalier de Rennaz, the Fondation des hôpitaux de la Riviera, then in liquidation, sold the Villa Zina. Since the sale, the villa has been used by the Fondation Enfance Emma Couvreu (formerly Fondation les Airelles).
