= Christabel (poem) =

1800 poem by Samuel Taylor Coleridge

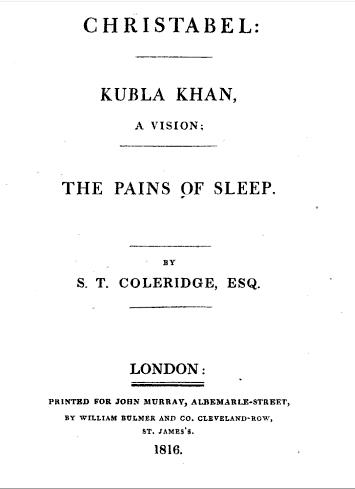
Christabel

Christabel is a long narrative ballad by Samuel Taylor Coleridge, in two parts. The first part was reputedly written in 1797, and the second in 1800. Coleridge planned three additional parts, but these were never completed. Coleridge prepared for the first two parts to be published in the 1800 edition of Lyrical Ballads, his collection of poems with William Wordsworth, but left it out on Wordsworth's advice. The exclusion of the poem, coupled with his inability to finish it, left Coleridge in doubt about his poetical power. It was published in a pamphlet in 1816, alongside Kubla Khan and The Pains of Sleep.

Coleridge wrote Christabel using an accentual metrical system, based on the count of only accents: even though the number of syllables in each line can vary from seven to twelve, the number of accents per line rarely deviates from four.

== Synopsis ==
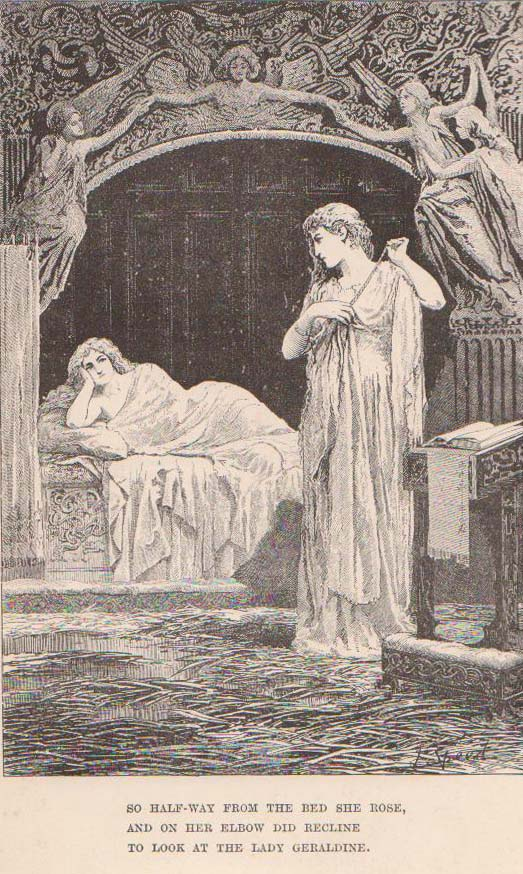
"So halfway from her bed she rose, And on her elbow did recline to look at the Lady Geraldine." from The Blue Poetry Book (1891), ed. Andrew Lang; illus. H. J. Ford and Lancelot Speed. London, Longmans, Green and Co.

The story of Christabel concerns a central female character of the same name and her encounter with a stranger called Geraldine, who claims to have been abducted from her home by a band of rough men.

Christabel goes into the woods to pray by the large oak tree, where she hears a strange noise. Upon looking behind the tree, she finds Geraldine who says that she had been abducted from her home by men on horseback. Christabel pities her and takes her home with her. However, supernatural signs (a dog angrily moaning despite being asleep, fading flames on torches suddenly reigniting, Geraldine being unable to cross an iron gate, denial of prayer) seem to indicate that all is not well. They spend the night together, but while Geraldine undresses, she shows a terrible but undefined mark: "Behold! her bosom and half her side— / A sight to dream of, not to tell! / And she is to sleep by Christabel" (246–48).

Christabel's father, Sir Leoline, becomes enthralled with Geraldine and orders a grand procession to announce her rescue. He ignores the weak objections of his daughter, who, although under enchantment, is starting to realize the enormity of Geraldine's malign nature. The unfinished poem ends here.

(Note: Geraldine and Leoline's names are pronounced to rhyme with "recline": /ˈdʒɛrəldaɪn/ and /ˈliːoʊlaɪn/.)

== Composition and publication history ==
It is unclear when Coleridge began writing the poem which would become Christabel. Presumably, he prepared it beginning in 1797. During this time, he had been working on several poems for Lyrical Ballads, a book on which he collaborated with William Wordsworth. Christabel was not complete in time for the book's 1798 publication, though it did include The Rime of the Ancient Mariner. The first part of the poem was likely completed that year, however. He continued to work on Part II of the poem for the next three years and finished it at Greta Hall in Keswick, where he had moved in 1800. It was also at Keswick that he became addicted to opium. A year later, he added a "Conclusion". The poem is, nevertheless, considered unfinished. He later noted that he was distracted by too many possible endings. He wrote, "I should have more nearly realized my ideal [had they been finished], than I would have done in my first attempt."

The poem remained unpublished for several years. On his birthday in 1803, he wrote in his notebook that he intended "to finish Christabel" before the end of the year, though he would not meet his goal. The poem was first published in the collection of three poems: Christabel; Kubla Khan: A Vision; The Pains of Sleep, by the John Murray Press on 25 May 1816.

== Analysis ==
Christabel
Recording of the poem.

Thematically the poem is one of Coleridge's most cohesive constructs, with the narrative plot more explicit than previous works such as the fragmented Kubla Khan which tend to transcend traditional composure. Indeed, in many respects the consistency of the poem – most apparent from the structural formality and rhythmic rigidity (four accentual beats to every line), when regarded alongside the unyielding mysticism of the account – creates the greatest juxtaposition in the poem.

The transgressive plot of Christabel revolves around the relationship, possibly sexual, of Geraldine and Christabel. Geraldine takes on a proto-vampiric role, with all the antecedent features that that necessitates: external beauty, a revelatory bodily mark, and a physical encounter (with the victims) that leaves them incapacitated. Percy Shelley, a friend of Coleridge's, after reading the poem, purportedly had nightmares and was obsessed with the poem; Epipsychidion, one of his later works, is partially inspired by it. Byron was similarly taken by the poem, and especially the relationship between the women, and wrote to Coleridge (on 18 October 1815): the description of the hall, the lamp suspended from the image, and more particularly of the girl herself as she went forth in the evening – all took a hold on my imagination which I never shall wish to shake off. Christabel, with its female-centric slant, became a symbol of female emancipation. Emmeline Pankhurst, the renowned feminist and suffragette, named her daughter, Christabel Pankhurst after the eponymous character. L'Etre Double by Renée Vivien, which is a work about a lesbian relationship, is heavily inspired by Christabel.

== Influence ==
Christabel was read at Villa Diodati at Lake Geneva by Lord Byron on the night of 18th July, 1816. He was joined by Percy Bysshe Shelley, Mary Godwin (now better known as Mary Shelley), Claire Clairmount, and John William Polidori. The group read a few stories while kept inside for 3 days due to heavy rains, before challenging each other to write new fantastical stories like Christabel and Fantasmagoriana. Godwin's first draft of Frankenstein, or The Modern Prometheus was created from this contest as well as Bryon's Fragment of a Novel and The Prisoner of Chillon, and Polidori's The Vampyre.

Christabel was an influence on Edgar Allan Poe, particularly his poem "The Sleeper" (1831).

It has been argued that Joseph Sheridan Le Fanu's 1872 novel Carmilla is an homage or adaptation of Christabel. Le Fanu's antagonist Carmilla has certain similarities with Christabel's Geraldine; for instance, she cannot cross the threshold of a house, and seems to be stronger at night. Likewise, the heroines of the two works are similar, both Christabel and Laura are the children of deceased mothers currently in the charge of their widowed fathers. Geraldine's presence gives Christabel similar symptoms as Carmilla's does to Laura; both heroines experience troubled sleep and weakness in the morning after spending the night with their guest.

Julia Margaret Cameron's photograph Christabel is named after the poem and depicts the titular character.

In 2002, US experimental filmmaker James Fotopoulos released a feature-length avant-garde cinematic adaptation of Christabel.

The poem is the inspiration for the song "Christabel", by Texan singer and songwriter Robert Earl Keen, which appeared on his 1984 album No Kinda Dancer.

Christabel also influenced the song "Beauty of the Beast" from Nightwish's album Century Child (2002).

Christabel was also an influence on The Cure, who wrote the song "A Foolish Arrangement" based on this poem. It was included on the band's 2004 compilation album Join the Dots: B-Sides and Rarities.

British novelist A.S. Byatt names a fictional romantic poet Christabel in her award-winning novel Possession.

Alex Levy-Heller wrote and directed a Brazilian adaptation in 2018.

Tony Reynolds' 2024 supernatural novel The Woodland Grave features protagonists named Christabel and Geraldine who meet in circumstances closely paralleling the poem.

Oklahoma noise rock band Chat Pile referenced the poem in the title of their song "Christabel ‘26" on their 2026 album Who Loves the Sun.

== See also ==
- 1816 in poetry
