= Ernest Burnat =

Swiss architect (1833–1922)

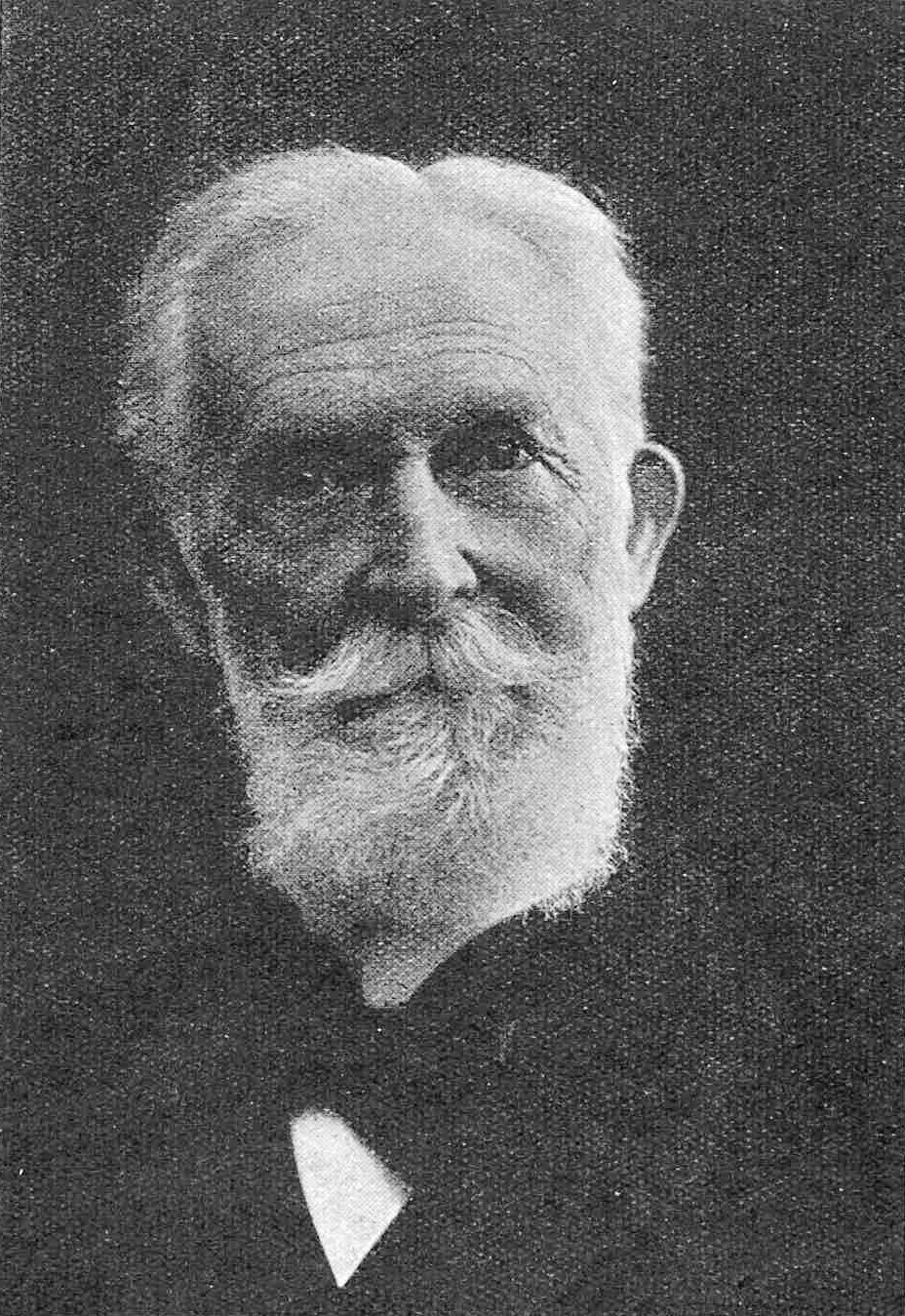
- Born: 7 October 1833; Vevey, Switzerland
- Died: 3 December 1922 (aged 89); Vevey, Switzerland
- Occupation: Architect
- Known for: Restoration of Chillon Castle and Lausanne Cathedral

Ernest Burnat (7 October 1833 – 3 December 1922) was a Swiss architect based in Vevey, in the canton of Vaud, Switzerland.

== Biography ==
Born to a family of independent means, Ernest Burnat studied at the private Gymnase libre in Geneva before attending the industrial design school (école de dessin industriel) in Mulhouse, where he worked alongside architect Émile Müller, known for designing a famous type of workers' housing. He later studied at the École nationale supérieure des Beaux-Arts in Paris from 1855 to 1860. Returning to Switzerland, he practiced architecture in Vevey from 1861 to 1881, partnering with Charles Nicati starting in 1861.

Burnat taught architecture at the École spéciale in Lausanne from 1863 to 1865. He was a member of the restoration commission for Chillon Castle and the technical commission for Lausanne Cathedral, playing a significant role in the restoration of these major landmarks. A bust of him, sculpted by Raphaël Lugeon, adorns the main portal of the cathedral.

A portrait of Burnat, painted in oil by Charles Giron in 1876, is housed in the Historical Museum of Vevey.

== Notable works ==
Burnat, in collaboration with Nicati, designed several significant hotels and historic villas, including:

- Hôtel des Crêtes in Clarens (1864)
- Hôtel du Lac in Vevey (1866–1868)
- Hôtel des Salines in Bex (1869–1872)
- Hôtel National (1872–1874) and the neo-Moorish Kursaal (1880–1881) in Montreux
- Villa Zina in Vevey (1877–1878)

== Bibliography ==
- Chapalay, Justine (2015). "Burnat & Nicati: Trajectoires de deux familles d'architectes associés". Revue vaudoise de généalogie et d'histoire des familles. Trajectoires d’architectes vaudois. Douze carrières de constructeurs des XIXe-XXe siècles: 75–85.
- Bissegger, Paul (1989). "Ernest Burnat et ses concours d'architecture à l'École des Beaux-Arts de Paris (1855-1860)". Revue suisse d'art et d'archéologie: 229–249.
