= Christabel (film) =

2001 film by James Fotopoulos

- Directed by: James Fotopoulos
- Screenplay by: James Fotopoulos
- Based on: Christabel (poem) by Samuel Taylor Coleridge
- Produced by: James Fotopoulos
- Starring: Kiersten DeBrower; Jenna Lecce; Veronica Sheaffer; Cherise Silvestri
- Edited by: Timothy Farrell
- Production company: Fantasma Inc.
- Distributed by: Facets Video (DVD)
- Release date: 2001
- Running time: 74 minutes
- Country: United States
- Language: English

Christabel is a 2001 avant-garde experimental film directed by James Fotopoulos and based on the unfinished poem of the same name by Samuel Taylor Coleridge.

== Production ==
Christabel was Fotopoulos’ first feature length narrative production, consisting of two half-hour segments shot on digital video and two short sequences shot in 16mm film. As an adaptation, it eliminates some of the male characters from the Coleridge text and focuses on the theme of one woman commandeering an evil possession of another.

== Cast ==
- Kiersten DeBrower as Geraldine
- Jenna Lecce as Sir Leoline
- Veronica Sheaffer as Christabel
- Cherise Silvestri as Bard Bracy

== Release ==
The film played on the festival circuit before receiving a DVD release from Facets Video.

== Critical response ==
Austin Chronicle wrote that Chistabel "poses perceptual and emotional challenges to his viewers", and that within the film "sexual symbolism is dense and not for all tastes."

Phil Hall of Film Threat panned the film, writing "for those who actively loathe experimental cinema, please avoid James Fotopoulos’ “Christabel” at all costs. And for those who actively love experimental cinema...well, the same advice applies", expanding that as a “loose adaptation of the poem by Samuel Taylor Coleridge, If this adaptation was any looser, it would fall off the screen." He found the film to be both plotless and pointless, and one that "offers absolutely nothing which could even vaguely or charitably be defined as art, imagination or stimulation."

Conversely, Chicago Reader wrote "Chicagoan James Fotopoulos has garnered critical acclaim", and that of his film Christabel, it was a "creepy, beautiful" feature, and of the film's screening at the 2002 New York Underground Film Festival, The Christian Science Monitor felt that it was a "frontrunner in the festival's avant-garde lineup", with Independent Film & Video Monthly writing Cristabel would "set festivals ablaze".
