= Chillon Castle =

Castle in Veytaux, Switzerland

Château de Chillon
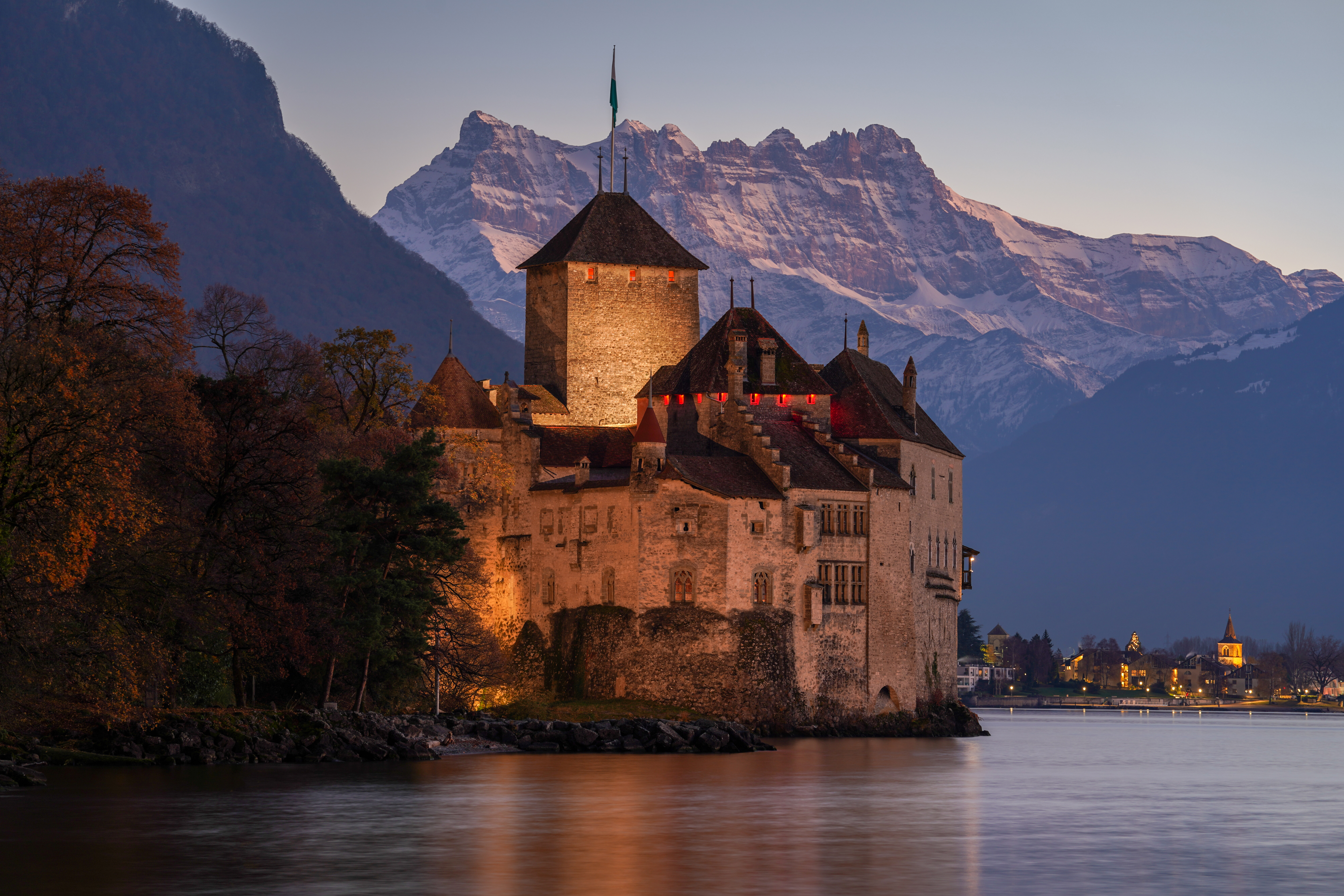
- Chillon Castle at nightfall with the Dents du Midi in the background

- Location within Canton of Vaud Location within Switzerland

General information
- Architectural style: Medieval
- Classification: Historic monument
- Location: Veytaux, Vaud, Switzerland
- Coordinates: 46°24′51″N 06°55′39″E

Design and construction
- Architect: Jacques de Saint-Georges

Website
- chillon.ch/en

Chillon Castle (French: Château de Chillon, pronounced [ʃɑto d(ə) ʃijɔ̃]) is a medieval island castle located on Lake Geneva, south of Veytaux in the Swiss canton of Vaud. It is situated at the eastern end of the lake, on the narrow shore between Montreux and Villeneuve, which gives access to the Alpine valley of the Rhône. Chillon is amongst the most visited medieval castles in Europe. Successively occupied by the House of Savoy, then by the Bernese from 1536 until 1798, it now belongs to the canton of Vaud and is classified as a Swiss Cultural Property of National Significance.

== Etymology ==
According to the Swiss ethnologist Albert Samuel Gatschet, the name Chillon derives from the Waldensian dialect and means "flat stone, slab, platform". The name Castrum Quilonis, attested from 1195, would, therefore, mean "castle built on a rock platform".

== Introduction ==
The castle of Chillon is built on the island of Chillon, a small, steep-sided oval limestone rock that advances into Lake Geneva between Montreux and Villeneuve. The placement of the castle is strategic: it guards the passage between the Vaud Riviera, which allows access to the north towards Germany and France, and the Rhone valley, a quick route to Italy, and offers a viewpoint over the Savoyard coast on the opposite side of the lake. A garrison could thus control (both militarily and commercially) the access to the road to Italy and apply a toll.

Chillon has been a military site since the central Middle Ages and the development of the current castle spans three periods: the Savoy Period, the Bernese Period, and the Vaudois Period.

== History ==
Aerial view (1948)

=== Savoy period ===
A square donjon was built on the island in the 11th century; the identity of the works' commissioner is currently in question. It was built to control the road from Burgundy to the Great Saint Bernard Pass. A charter of 1150, in which Count Humbert III granted the Cistercians of Hautcrêt free passage to Chillon, shows that the castle was under the authority of the House of Savoy.

From the mid 12th century, the castle was the summer home for the Counts of Savoy, who kept a fleet of ships on Lake Geneva. The castle was greatly expanded in 1248 and 1266–7 by Count Peter II. During this time the distinctive windows were added by Master James of Saint George, who is believed also to have added similar windows to Harlech Castle in Wales at a later date.

=== Chillon as a prison ===
The counts and dukes of Savoy used the castle as a residence but also to house prisoners. Its most famous prisoner was probably François de Bonivard, a Genevois monk, prior of St. Victor in Geneva and historian, who was imprisoned there for six years in 1530.

=== Bernese period ===
In 1536, the castle was captured by a Bernese army, and all the prisoners, including Bonivard, were released. The castle became the residence for the Bernese bailiff.

=== Vaudois period ===
In 1798, the French-speaking canton of Vaud drove out the German-speaking Bernese authorities and declared the Lemanic Republic. The Vaudois invited in French troops to help them maintain autonomy from the other Swiss. When the French moved in and occupied, Chillon was used as a munitions and weapons depot.

== Restoration ==
At the end of the 19th century, a systematic restoration of the monument was undertaken, through which an ethic of monumental restoration was developed in one of the first cases of the application of archaeology and history to rebuild a structure in a historically accurate way. This was possible because of the combination of four factors:

- The involvement of pioneering specialists in restoration including Johann Rudolf Rahn, one of the founders of the Swiss Society of Historical Monuments in 1880, and Henry de Geymüller, a specialist in Renaissance architecture who was closely associated with the restoration of buildings such as the Romanesque Church of Saint-Sulpice, Vaud in Saint-Sulpice, the Saint-François church in Lausanne, and the Lausanne Cathedral. The initial lead architect of the restoration at Chillon was Ernest Burnat, who had worked with de Geymüller in restoring Lausanne Cathedral. He initiated a general survey of the fortress, which was continued and intensified by his replacement as lead architect-archaeologist, Albert Naef, who played a major role in the development of archaeology in the Canton of Vaud. Naef devoted twenty years to the study of Chillon. Subordinating aesthetics to historical accuracy, he undertook detailed research into historical archives and conducted extensive archaeological excavations. The process was conscientiously documented in plans, sketches, photographs, and a journal kept by Naef. Until it was abandoned in 1908 the restoration followed a painstaking process of indicating replacement stones with inscriptions on the cut stone (R = Restored; RFS = Restoration facsimile; RL = Free Restoration), or by a change of colour or a red line on the masonry. Naef also restored the interior of the castle, including the tapestries of certain rooms, such as the great room of the bailiff, also called the "great Bernese kitchen".
- The creation in 1887 of The Association for the Restoration of Chillon. From the outset, the Association aimed for an "artistic" restoration with the intention of "giving back to objects the character with which they were clothed, almost a latent life, a life impression of the ideas of their time". It is also planned to create a historical museum at the castle.
- The appointment in 1889 of a Technical Commission comprising renowned art historians and architects who specialised in monument restoration. Alongside Rahn and de Geymüller, it included Théodore Fivel, architect in Chambéry and connoisseur of Savoyard castle architecture, Léo Chatelain, restorer of the Collegiate Church of Neuchâtel, and State architect Henri Assinare. The Commission first met on 27 October 1890 and closely supervised the restoration over subsequent years. De Geymüller played a key role in its success. Drawing on principles published in 1865, and enhanced in 1888, by the Royal Institute of British Architects, he established a framework in the Milestones for the Restoration Program printed in Lausanne in 1896. Naef also joined the Technical Commission on the death of Fivel in 1895.
- The adoption by the Canton of Vaud in 1898 of a law on historic monuments, the first of its kind in Switzerland, which planned to establish a cantonal Commission for historic monuments and to create a cantonal archeologist's post. Naef, who drafted the law, was the first appointee to this function and was responsible for putting in place protection of historical monuments.

The result was judged to be exemplary. In an 1898 lecture to the Zurich Antiquity Society, Johann Rudolf Rahn boasted about it, while the German Emperor, William II, inquired about the Chillon model when planning the reconstruction of the fortress of Haut-Koenigsbourg. Due to these restorations, the castle is in excellent condition and is a good model of feudal architecture.

== Tourism ==
From the end of the 18th century, the castle attracted romantic writers and inspired poets from around the world, including Jean-Jacques Rousseau, Victor Hugo, Alexandre Dumas, Gustave Flaubert, Mary Shelley and Lord Byron. By 1939, helped by its proximity to the popular tourist destination Montreux, the castle was attracting over 100,000 visitors a year. By 2005, this number had increased to 300,000.

Chillon remains, according to the castle's website, "Switzerland's most visited historic monument". Entrance costs 15CHF for an adult. There are parking spaces and a nearby bus stop. Inside the castle are recreations of the interiors of some of the main rooms including the grand bedroom, hall, and cave stores. Visitors can view four great halls, three courtyards, and a series of bedrooms including the Camera domini, which was occupied by the Duke of Savoy and is decorated with 14th-century murals.

== In art and popular culture ==
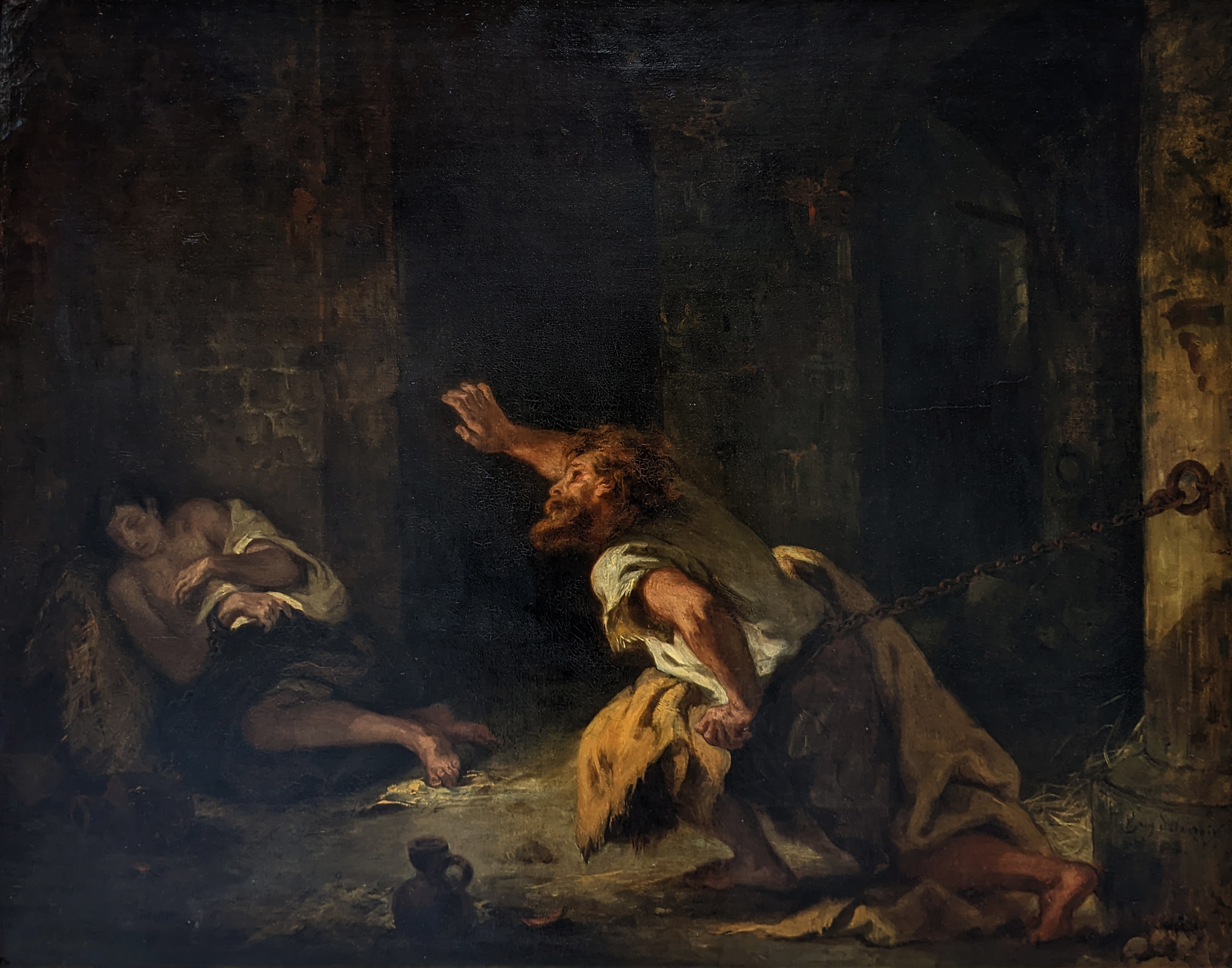
The Prisoner of Chillon by Eugène Delacroix

Having been inspired by the story of François Bonivard after a visit to the castle, Lord Byron wrote a poem entitled The Prisoner of Chillon in 1816 about François. Byron supposedly carved his name on a pillar of the dungeon. The French artist Eugène Delacroix drew inspiration from Byron's poem for his painting The Prisoner of Chillon which was exhibited at the Salon of 1835.

Letitia Elizabeth Landon included a poetical illustration to a painting of the castle by Samuel Prout (engraved by J. B. Allen), 'The Castle of Chillon'. in Fisher's Drawing Room Scrap Book, 1838.

Gustave Courbet painted the castle several times during his Swiss exile in nearby La Tour-de-Peilz. The most famous representation is "The Castle of Chillon", oil on canvas painted in 1874 and currently located at the Musée Courbet in Ornans in France.

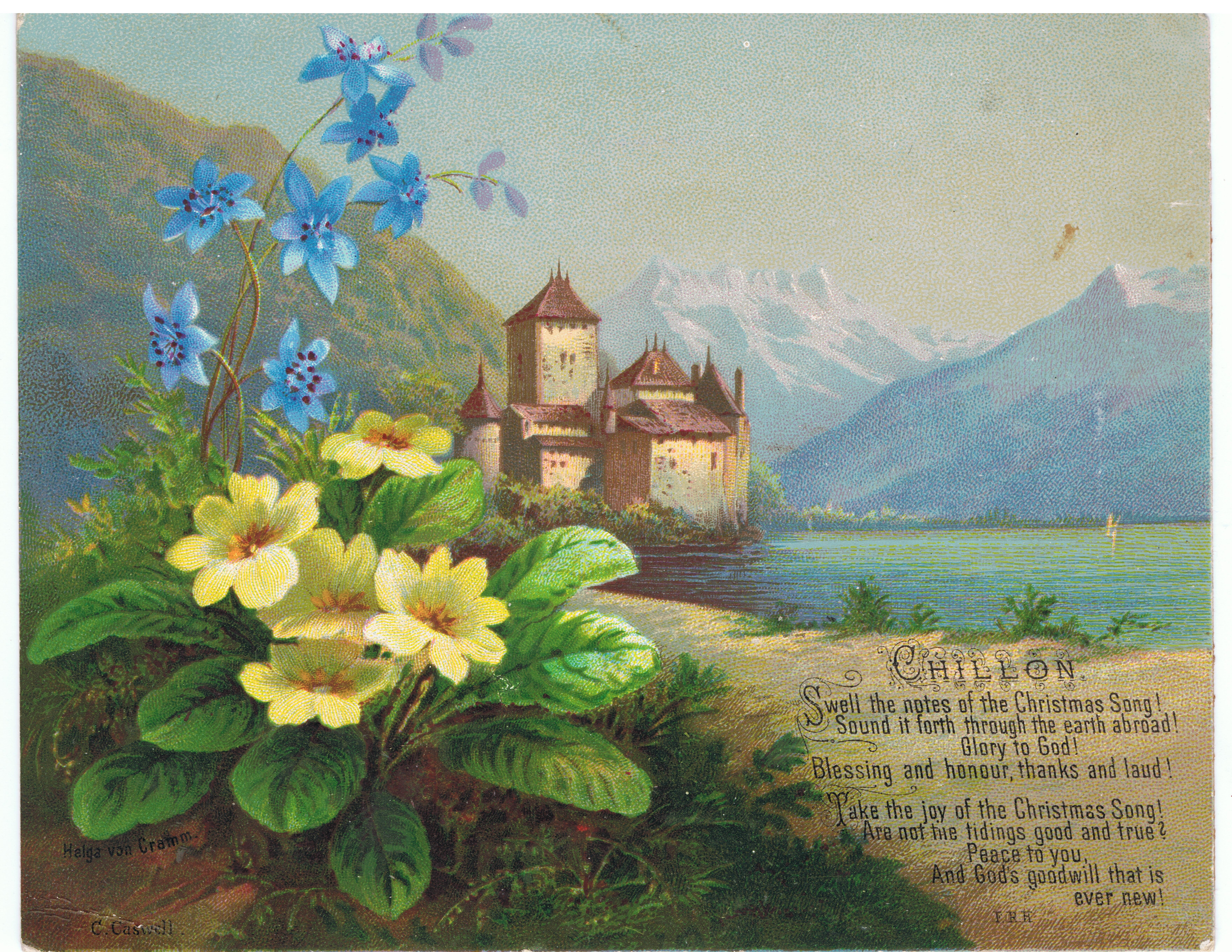
Chromolithograph of Chillon by Helga von Cramm with a Havergal prayer, hymn or poem, c. 1878.

In his 1878 novel Daisy Miller, Henry James has his heroine and a young American compatriot, Winterbourne, visit Chillon Castle. The one-time prison of François Bonivard assumes a symbolic and premonitory significance for Daisy Miller, who thinks she can escape the shackles of social conventions.

In 1890, watchmaker Edouard- GabrielWuthrich, finished a mechanical automaton that took five years to make. Made of zinc, steel and brass it is a 1/100 scale model illustrating the capture of the castle and liberation of François Bonivard by the Bernese in 1536. Measuring 100 cm × 67 cm × 42 cm (39 in × 26 in × 17 in), it is equipped with a music box with original sheet music handwritten by Genevan composer E. Perrin and includes one hundred moving figurines, including many small soldiers and scenes of torture in dungeons visible through barred windows. The automaton disappeared for decades and was eventually purchased by the Association of Friends of Chillon, the Cantonal Museum of Archeology and History (MCAH) and the Castle Foundation, for 59,000 Swiss francs, at an auction held in Paris in March 2016.

The painter E. Lapierre depicted the castle in oil on canvas in 1896.

Chillon was used as the cover image of Bill Evans' 1968 live album Bill Evans at the Montreux Jazz Festival and inspired Prince Eric's castle in the 1989 Disney animated film The Little Mermaid.

Patrick Caulfield's painting After Lunch (1975) includes a photomural of Chateau Chillon.

The castle has twice hosted the Compagnie du Graal theatre company, based in Thonon-les-Bains, in 2009 for a sound and light adaptation of Shakespeare's King Lear and again in 2012 for the creation of an epic fresco inspired by the Titan of Greek mythology, Hyperion.

== Gallery ==
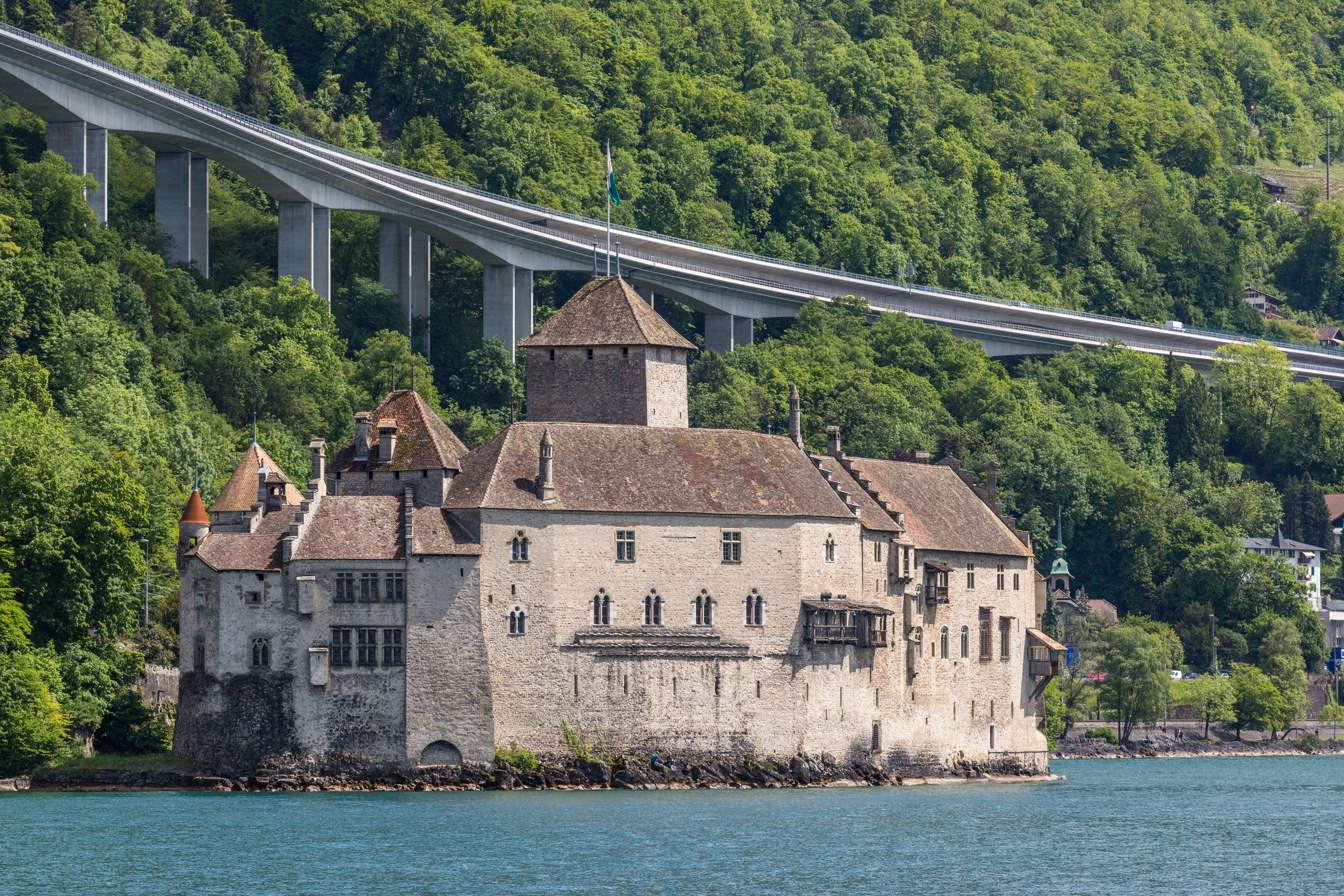
Chillon Castle and Motorway

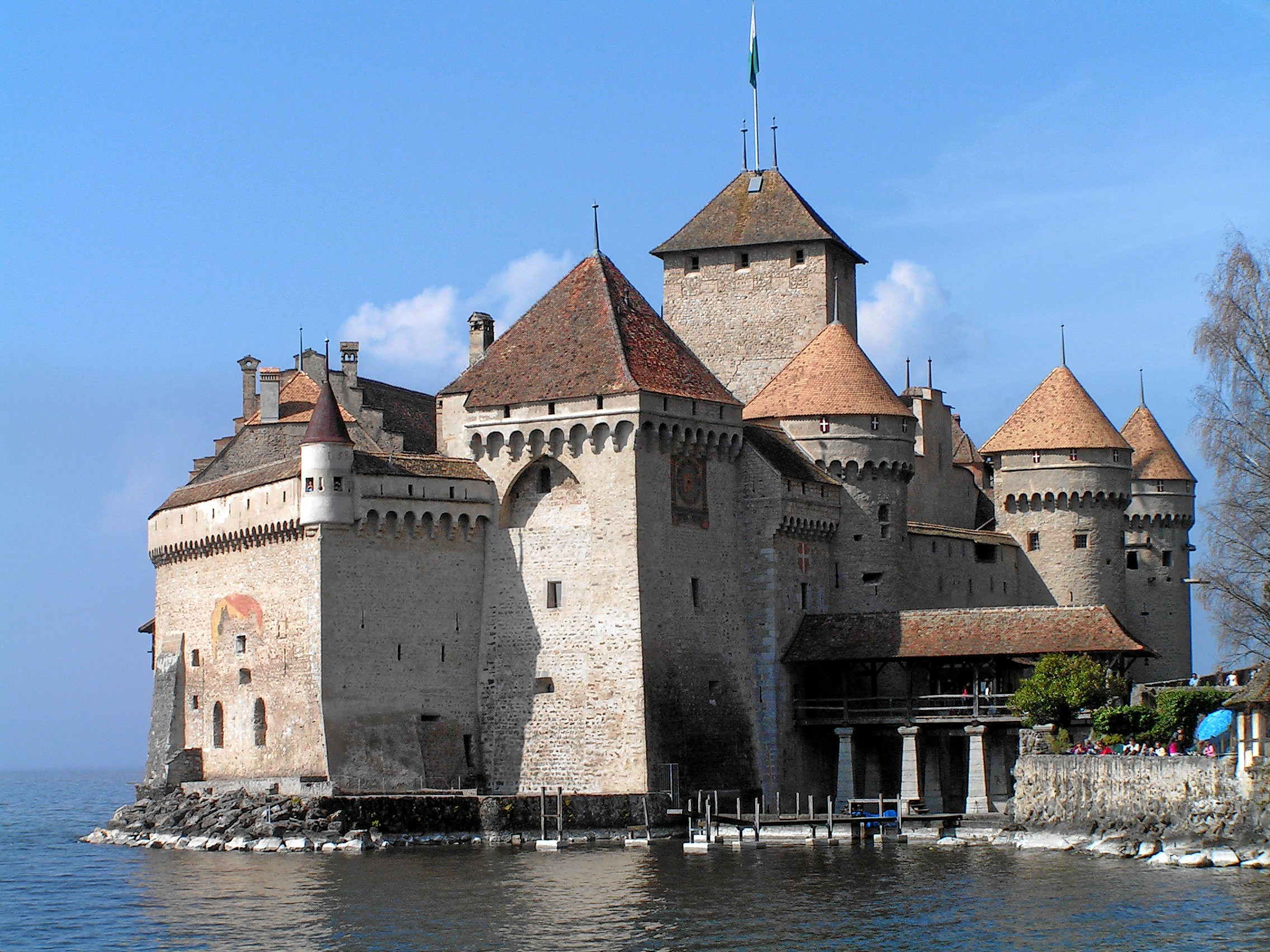
From the south

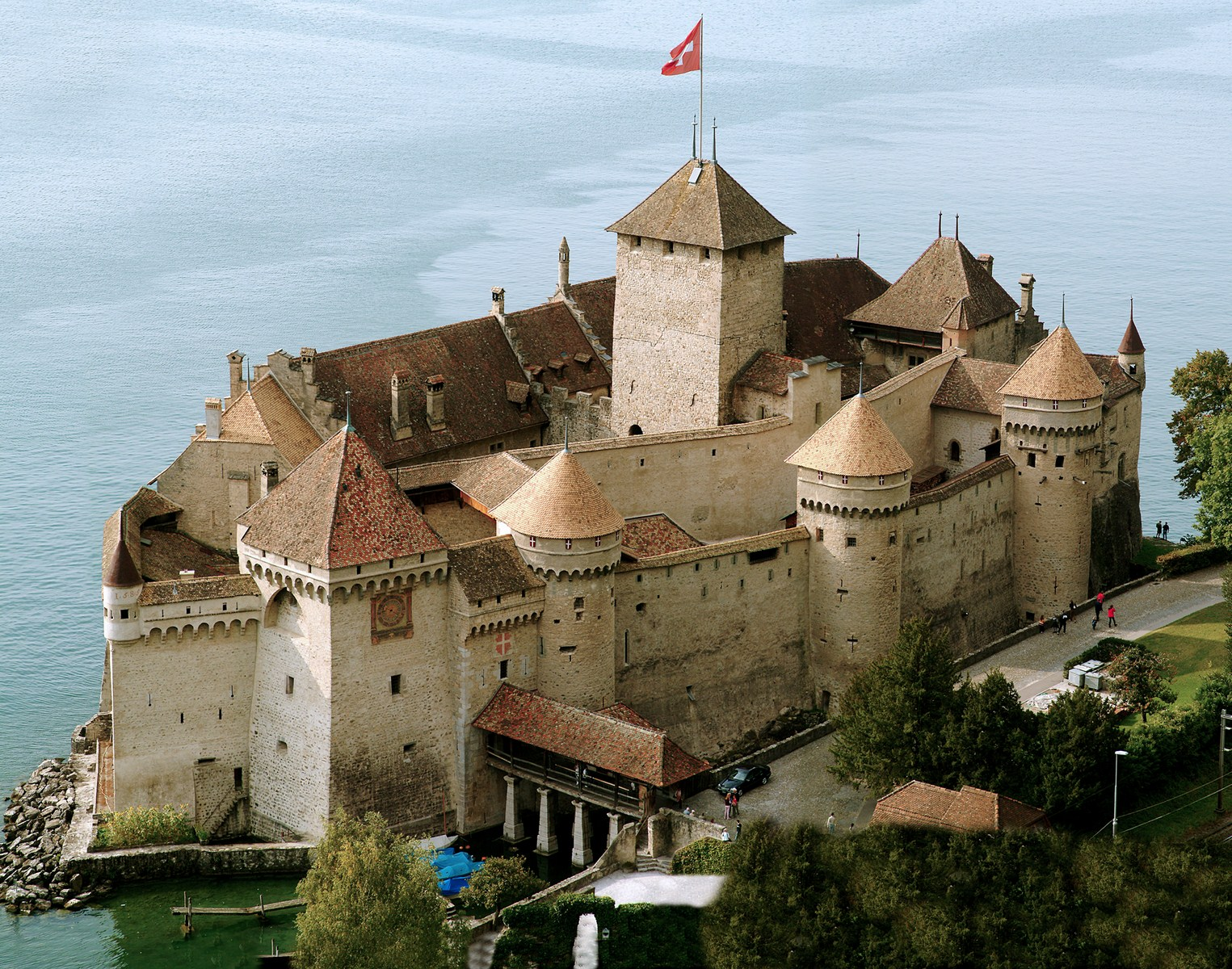
From above

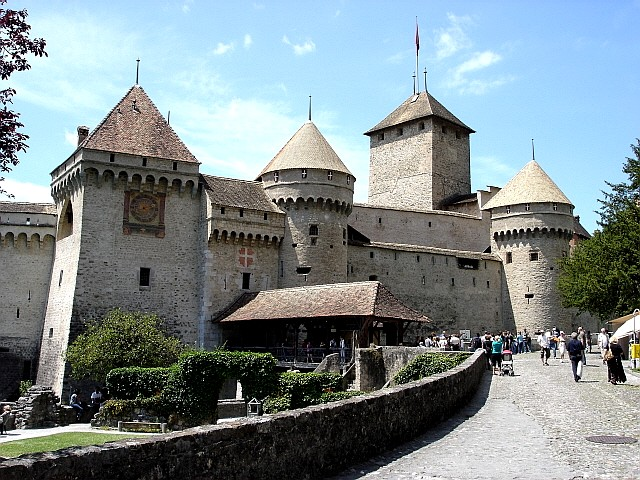
Front

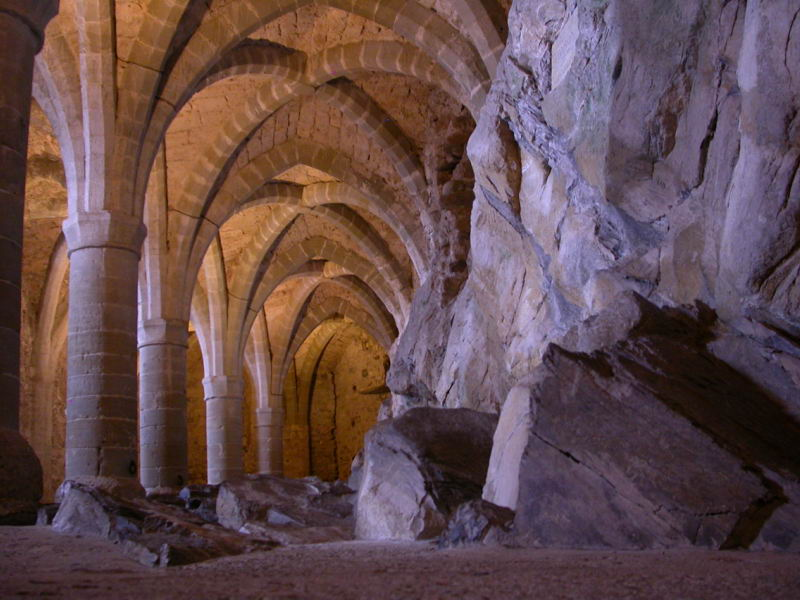
Chillon Castle crypt

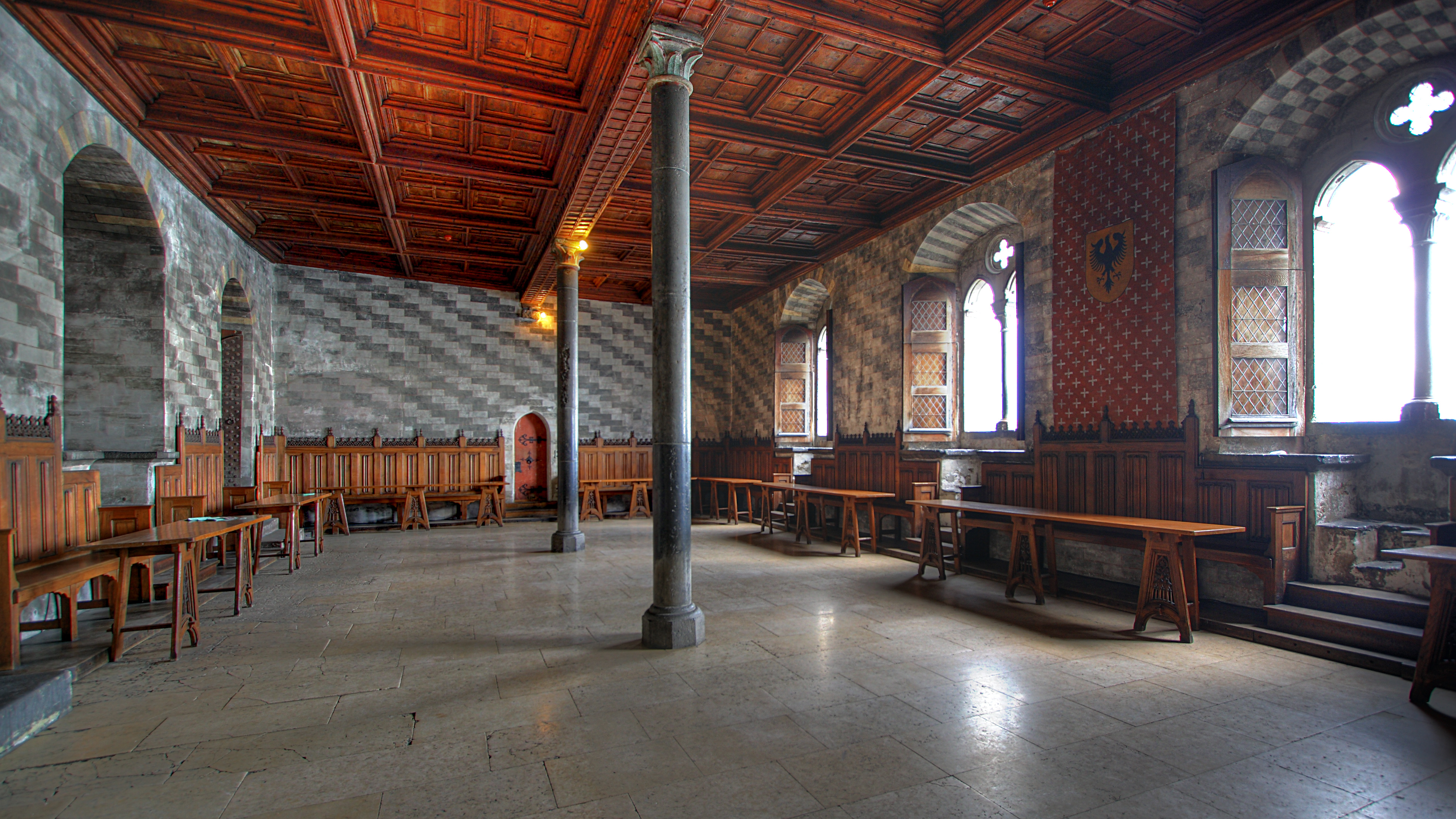
Grand Hall of the Count

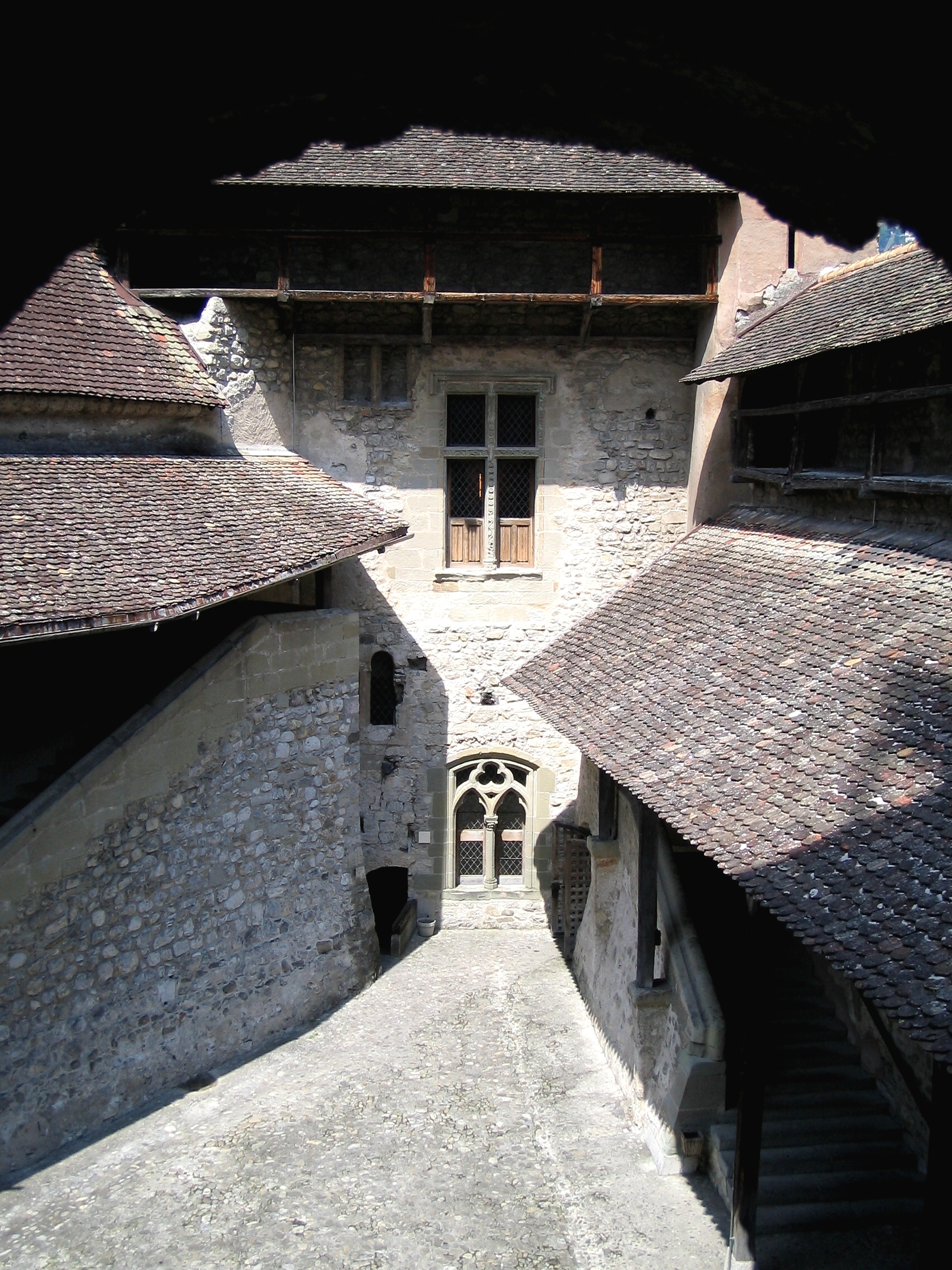
The castle courtyard

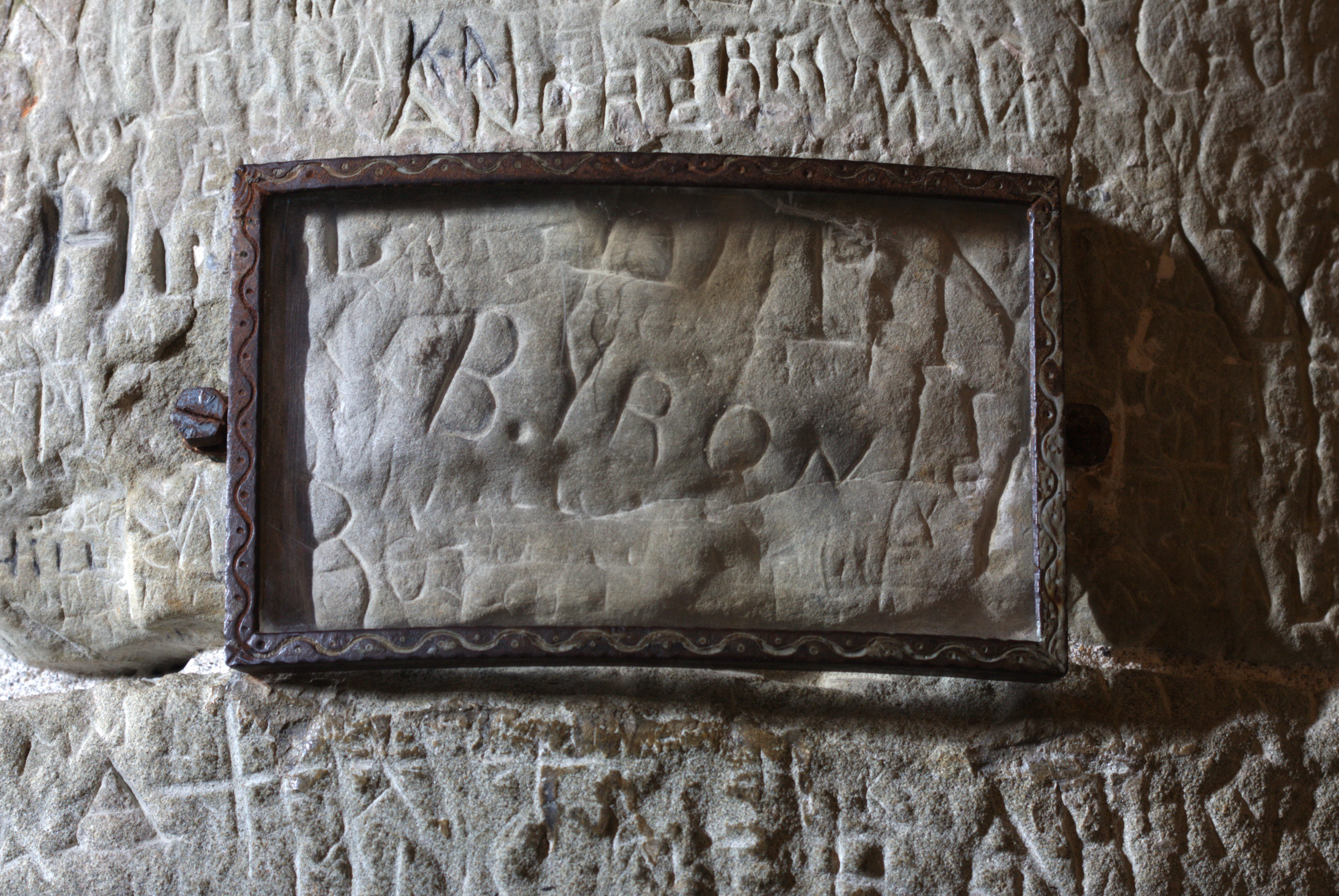
Byron's signature in the dungeon

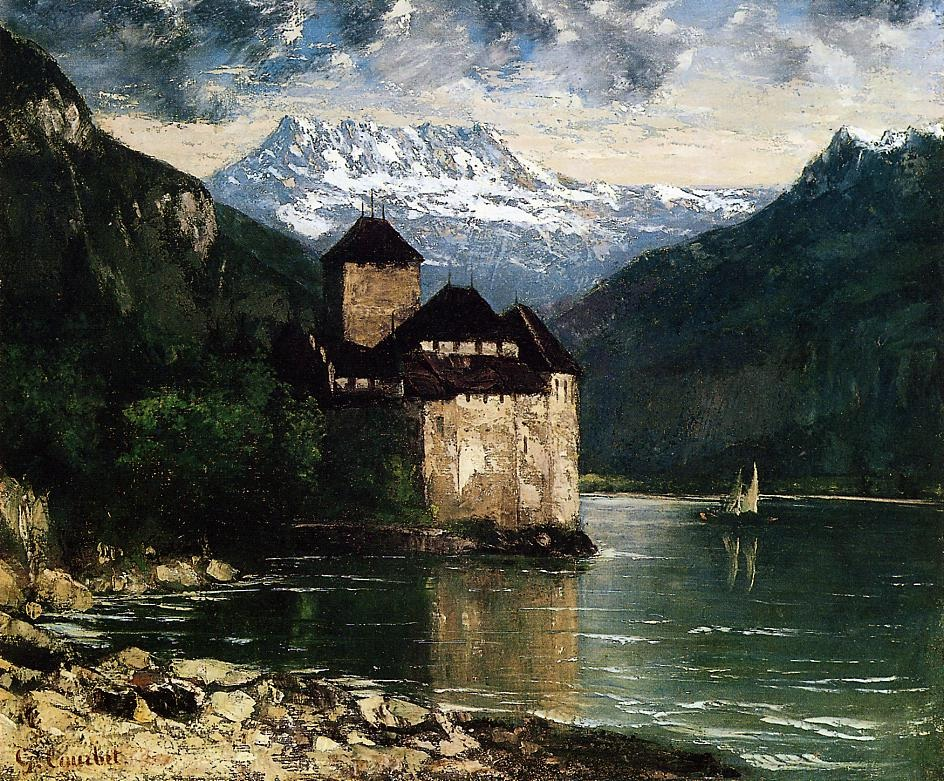
Chateau du Chillon by Gustave Courbet, 1875

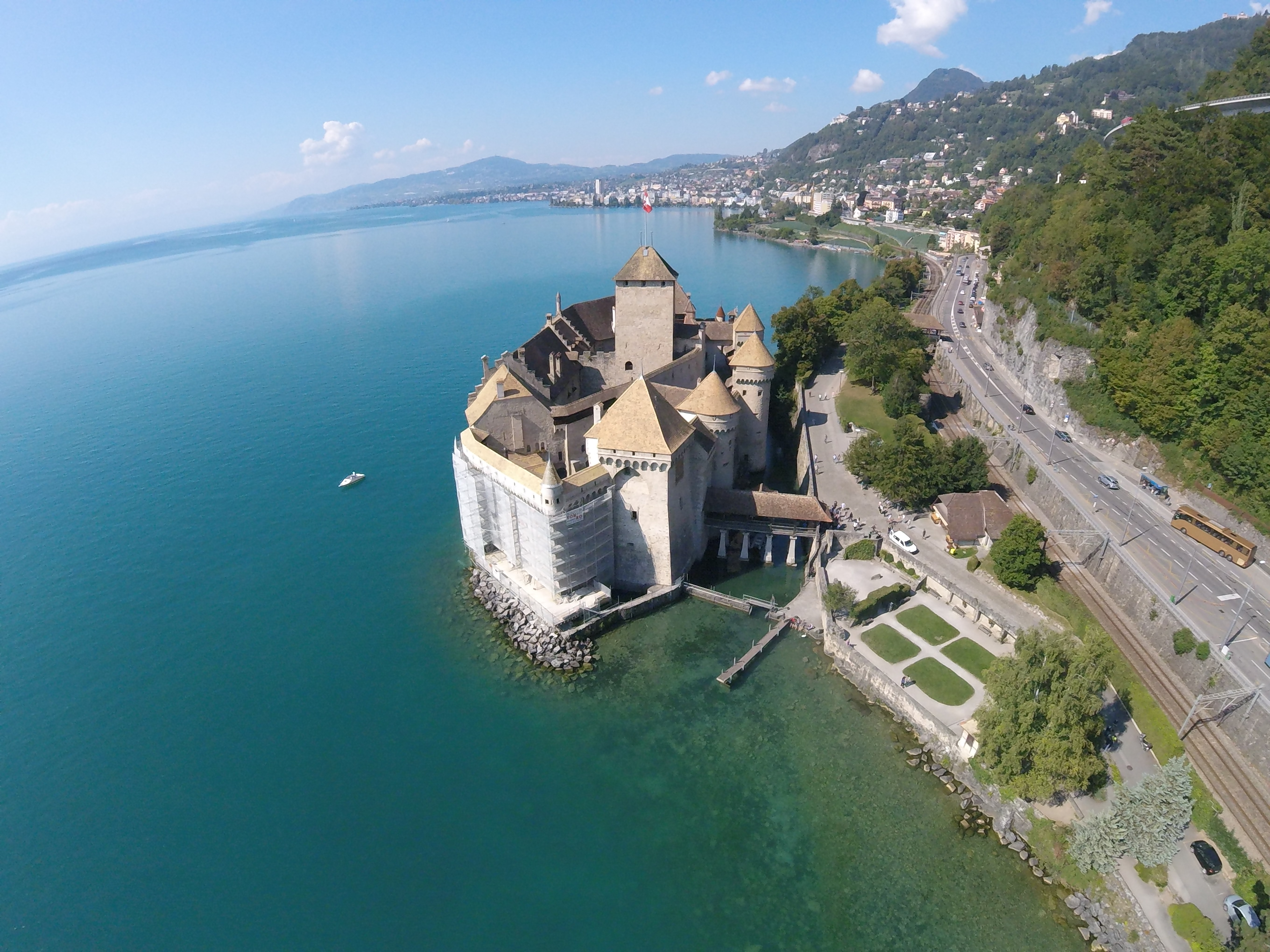
Chillon Castle, aerial view

== See also ==
- Fort de Chillon – a 20th-century fort largely buried in the adjoining hillside
- List of castles in Switzerland
- List of islands of Switzerland
- Tourism in Switzerland
