= The Prisoner of Chillon =

1816 poem by Lord Byron

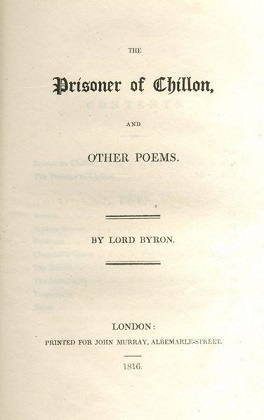
- 1816 first edition title page.
- Author: Lord Byron
- Original title: 'The Prisoner of Chillon, and Other Poems'
- Language: English
- Genre: Poetry, Literature
- Publisher: John Murray
- Publication date: 1816
- Publication place: London
- Media type: Book
- Pages: 60

The Prisoner of Chillon is the title poem of an 1816 collection by Lord Byron. "The Prisoner of Chillon" is a 392-line narrative poem that chronicles the imprisonment of Genevois monk François Bonivard from 1532 to 1536.

The Prisoner of Chillon, and Other Poems was published in 1816 by John Murray in London. The collection included "Sonnet on Chillon", "Sonnet", "Stanzas to —", "Darkness", "Churchill's Grave", "The Dream", "The Incantation" (from Manfred), "Prometheus", and explanatory notes.

== Background ==
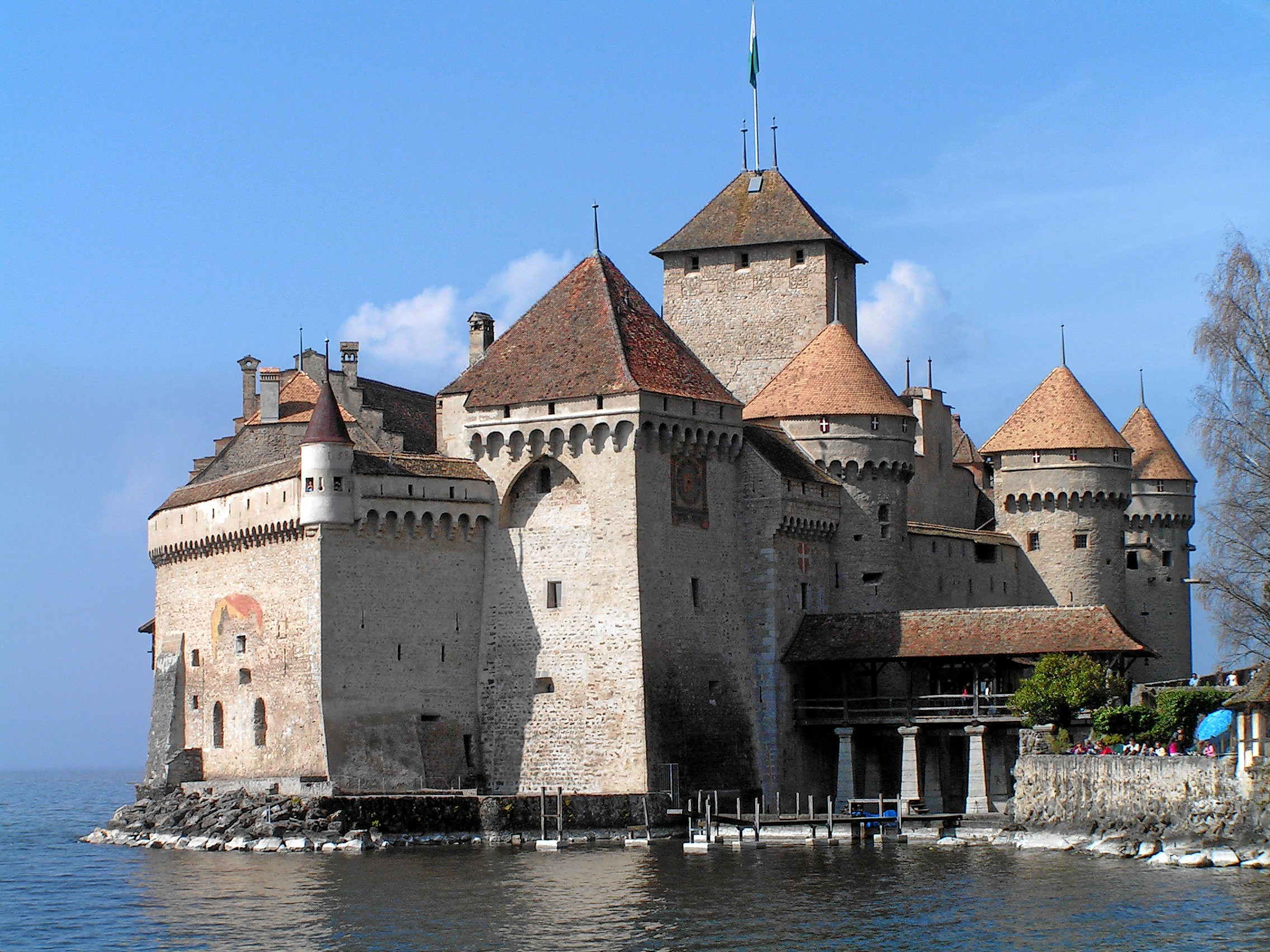
The castle dungeon is under Lake Geneva.

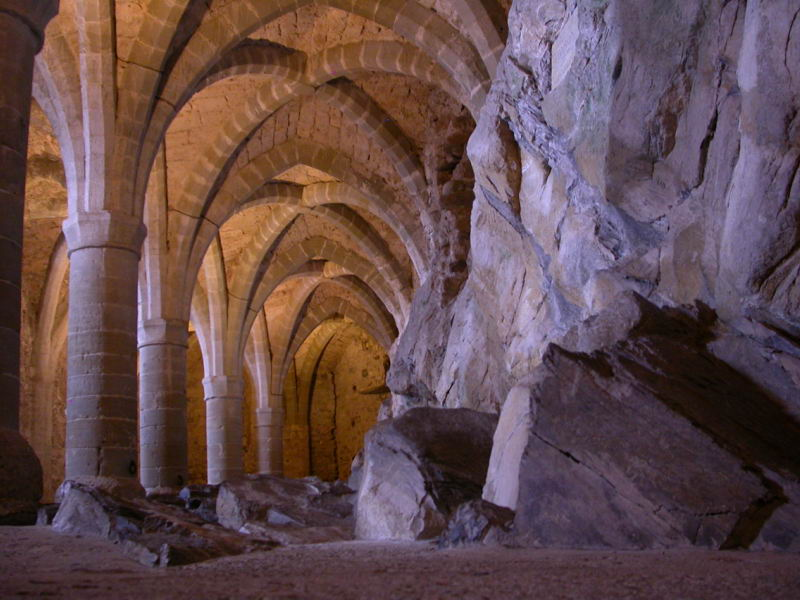
Prisoners were chained to the massive pillars in the dungeon.

Chillon Castle near Montreux, Switzerland.

On 25 June 1816, Lord Byron and his friend Percy Bysshe Shelley sailed across Lake Geneva to visit the three mouths of the Rhône and Chillon Castle. The trip was partially inspired by Shelley's admiration of Jean-Jacques Rousseau's Julie; or, The New Heloise and its vivid depictions of the lake.

Byron and Shelley toured Chillon and etched their names in its stone walls. They also saw the dungeon where François Bonivard was imprisoned. The dungeon is carved out below Lake Geneva. In his travelogue, Shelley recalled there was a mechanism that enabled the space to be flooded at a moment's notice.

As they returned to Villa Diodati on the opposite end of Lake Geneva, a severe storm prevented sailing. Byron and Shelley spent 27–9 June at Hotel de l'Ancre in Ouchy, where Byron likely started drafting "The Prisoner of Chillon".

Other manuscript evidence suggests Byron did not start the poem until after he left Ouchy. He seemed to have finished it by 2 July. Shelley took Claire Clairmont's fair copy of the poetry collection back to England in August. John Murray published 6,000 copies of The Prisoner of Chillon and Other Poems on 5 December 1816.

Byron was never more prolific than in the period after he left England. In addition to "The Prisoner of Chillon", he wrote the third canto of Childe Harold's Pilgrimage and the supernatural drama Manfred. He later wrote an introduction to the poem that quoted Jean Senebier's pocket biography of Bonnivard. This text first appeared in the 1832 edition of his collected works.

== Title poem ==
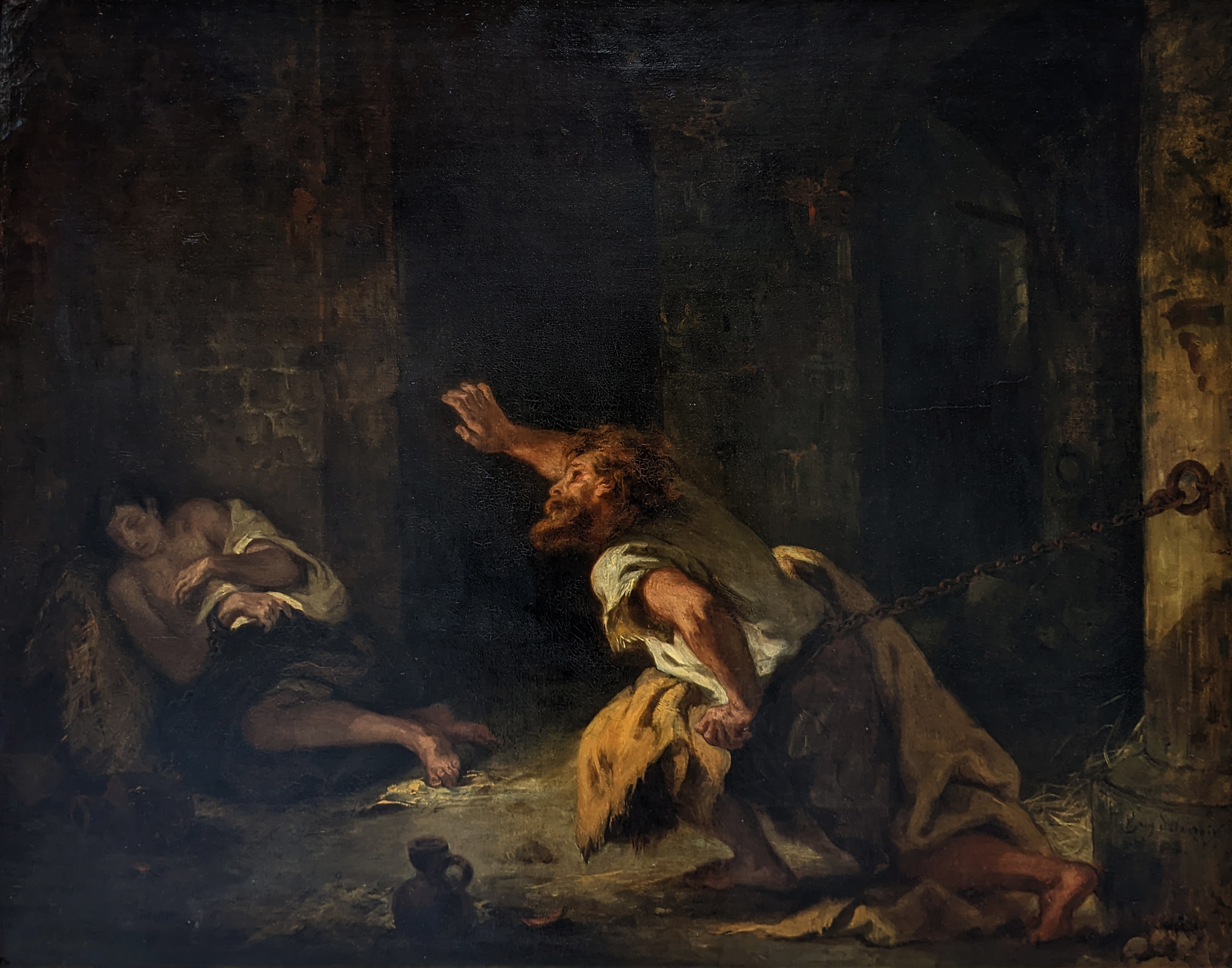
The Prisoner of Chillon by Eugène Delacroix, 1834

"The Prisoner of Chillon" is subtitled "A Fable". It contains 14 stanzas. Like Mazeppa and The Island, "The Prisoner of Chillon" is a romantic verse-tale. Shelley suggested Dante's treatment of Ugolino della Gherardesca in Divine Comedy spurred Byron to write about Bonnivard. In his commentary on Byron's collected works, Eugen Kölbing argued that the poem borrows from "Palamon and Arcite" in John Dryden's Fables, Ancient and Modern. The protagonist of the poem is a typical Byronic victim-hero, an isolated sufferer with a strong will. François Bonivard bore little resemblance to Byron's hero.

The poem is told by the prisoner, who is old and grey. He recalls the tragic fate of his martyred family. His father and brother were burnt at the stake, and two more brothers died in battle. Chained to pillars in Chillon's dungeon, he is imprisoned with his remaining siblings who waste away in the harsh environment. The guards bury them in shallow graves in the dungeon floor.

After their deaths, the prisoner is disconsolate. A visiting bird rekindles his spirit. His jailers soon loose him from the pillar. When he is finally rescued, he sees no difference between prison and freedom.

=== Artwork ===
George Cruikshank created several illustrations for George Clinton's 1825 biography and anthology of Lord Byron. His plate for "The Prisoner of Chillon" features the prisoner freed from his chains while the body of one of his brothers lies behind him. When Eugène Delacroix took up the subject a decade later, his composition is similar to Cruikshank's.

== Other poems ==
"The Sonnet on Chillon" was most likely written after "The Prisoner of Chillon".

The "Sonnet" in the volume is anthologized as "Sonnet to Lake Leman". Byron wrote it in the bound manuscript that he sent to John Murray for publication. Byron adapts the French name for Lake Geneva, which is Léman.

"Stanzas to —" is anthologized as "Stanzas to Augusta". It is another text where Byron deals with the end of his marriage.

"Churchill's Grave, A Fact Literally Remembered" was written after visiting Charles Churchill's burial site on April 24, 1816. Before his exile from England, Byron made the pilgrimage with his friend John Hobhouse. Byron wrote a brief note explaining the poem's debt to William Wordsworth, "of whom there can exist few greater admirers or deplorers than myself".

Byron wrote the "Incantation" in the summer of 1816. In The Prisoner of Chillon, Byron prefaces the text, "The following Poem was a Chorus in an unfinished Witch drama, which was begun some years ago." The implication that "Incantation" was written earlier than 1816 is supported by various manuscript evidence. In the manuscript of Manfred, Byron instructed the publisher to simply insert the copy from The Prisoner of Chillon at the appropriate place in the drama. It occurs at the end of the first scene in Act I. Its invective is directed at Lady Byron.

"Prometheus" was spurred by Shelley's translation that summer of Aeschylus' Prometheus Bound. Mary Shelley's Frankenstein was subtitled "the modern Prometheus". Shelley had dictated his translation to Mary. In 1820, he published his own treatment of the myth, Prometheus Unbound. Byron often referred to the Titan in his work, but he depicts Prometheus as a fundamentally flawed figure. His portrait seems to be drawn from the work of August Wilhelm Schlegel.

== Reception ==
In October 1816, Walter Scott wrote a lengthy piece about Lord Byron's work in Quarterly Review. He described "The Prisoner of Chillon" as "more powerful than pleasing" and the prison "like that of Ugolino, a subject too dismal for even the power of the painter or poet to counteract its horrors." He praised the dungeon's depiction, "it may rival any which Lord Byron has drawn, nor is it possible to read it without a sinking of the heart". Francis Jeffrey, writing at similar length in the Edinburgh Review, found the title poem the most amiable of the volume. Aside from "Darkness", Jeffrey felt the remaining poems were too personal to be of use.

Most other reviews of the book were unfavorable. One critic lampooned the work as another forgery along the lines of Lord Byron's Pilgrimage to the Holy Land.

== Sources ==
- Cochran, Peter, ed. The Manuscripts of the Younger Romantics. Lord Byron. Volume XIII. The Prisoner of Chillon and Don Juan Canto IX. A Facsimile of the Original Draft Manuscripts in the Beinecke Library of Yale University (New York and London: Garland Publishing, 1995), pp. xvi+189.
- Cochran, Peter, ed. "The Prisoner of Chillon". The Newstead Abbey Byron Society. Retrieved 29 January 2026.
- Kędra-Kardela, Anna, and Aleksandra Kędzierska. "From the Profane to the Sacred: Prison-Space Transformations in GG Byron’s 'The Prisoner of Chillon' and O. Wilde’s 'The Ballad of Reading Gaol'." Roczniki Humanistyczne 66.11 (2019): 149-164.
- Wood, Gerald C. "Nature and Narrative in Byron's 'The Prisoner of Chillon'." Keats-Shelley Journal, Vol. 24 (1975), pp. 108-117.
