= François Bonivard =

Genevan patriot, politician and historian

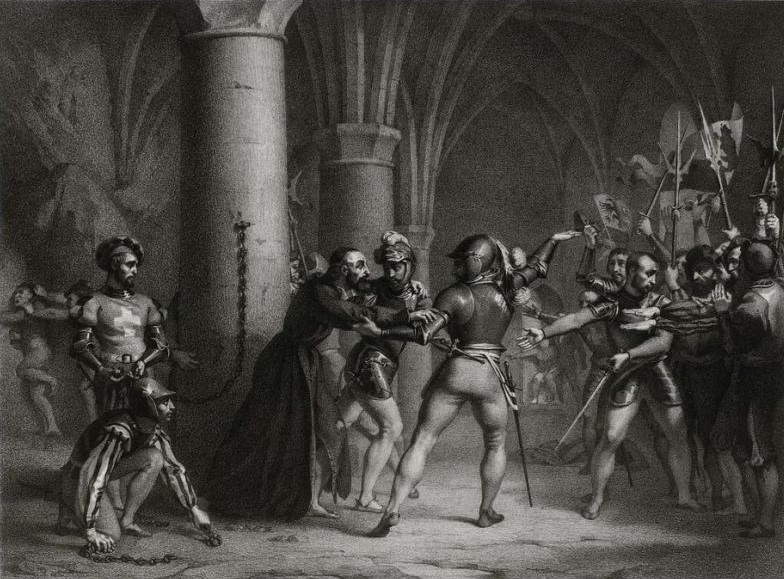
The delivery of Bonivard, painting by Franck-Édouard Lossier (1898)

François Bonivard (or Bonnivard; 1493–1570) was a nobleman, ecclesiastic, historian, and Geneva patriot at the time of the Republic of Geneva. His life was the inspiration for Lord Byron's 1816 poem The Prisoner of Chillon. He was a partisan of the Protestant Reformation, and by most accounts was a libertine, despite his vocation.

== Biography ==
Bonivard was the son of Louis Bonivard, Seigneur de Lunes, and was born at Seyssel into a noble family of Savoy. He was educated by various monks under the jurisdiction of his uncle, Jean-Aimé de Bonivard, who was prior of St.-Victor, a monastery just outside the walls of Geneva. At the age of seven, Bonivard was sent to study at Pinerolo, Italy; for most of his youth, he reportedly preferred amusements to learning. He attended the University of Turin and, on his uncle's death, succeeded him at St.-Victor in 1510.

After Charles III, Duke of Savoy, seized the Bonivards' property except for the priory, Bonivard sided with the patriots of Geneva who opposed the Savoy efforts to control the region. In 1519 he fled Geneva, disguised as a monk, upon news that the Duke was approaching. He was cozened by friends, the Lord of Varuz and Brisset, the Abbot of Montheron of the Pays de Vaud, who betrayed him. They turned him over to the Duke, who imprisoned him at Grolée, one of his castles on the Rhone, from 1519 to 1521. The Abbot of Montheron was given the monastery St.-Victor, but was evidently poisoned by friends of Bonivard, who also worked to release Bonivard from prison. Bonivard returned to the priory in 1527.

The experience was not much of a deterrent; Bonivard continued his political activism. In 1530, he was set upon by the Duke's men when he thought he could spend a safe night in Moudon, and was again handed over to the Duke, who imprisoned him once more, this time underground in the Castle of Chillon. Bonivard was released by the Bernese when they conquered Vaud in 1536. His priory had meanwhile been razed, but Geneva awarded him a pension. He was made bourgeois of Geneva in 1537, a position he felt compelled to renounce due to his precarious finances. The Genevese also awarded him a seat on the Council of Two Hundred in 1537, which granted him a salary. He lived chiefly in Bern and Lausanne after 1538, but returned to Geneva permanently in 1544.

Bonivard was married four times. The first time was to Catherine Baumgartner, perhaps in 1542, which appears to have ended the following year upon her death. He was next married to Jeanne Darmeis, the widow of Pierre Corne, from 1544 until her death in 1552; they "lived very little and very badly together." His third marriage was to another widow, Pernette Mazue or Mazure; they were married 1550–1562. Mazure's fortune, however, was left to her son; though Bonivard's first wife seems to have been a good manager of his estate, he was dedicated to spending money and hosting dinners for his friends, and reportedly scandalized the neighborhood with his parties. He was urged to marry again by neighboring citizens to reduce the scandal. His fourth wife, therefore, was an unfrocked nun, Catherine de Courtaronel or Courtavonne; he was sixty-nine, and there is no evidence that they wished to marry except to quiet the neighbors. A few years later, Catherine was arrested in their house for immorality and infidelity; Bonivard sought to exonerate her, but she was executed by drowning in the Rhone River, and her lover was beheaded.

He is said to have been perpetually in debt, due to his extravagant life-style.

In 1542, he was entrusted with compiling a history of Geneva from its beginning, and wrote that story to the date of 1530 before he died. The manuscript of Chroniqves de Genève (Chroniques de Genève) was sent to John Calvin for correction in 1551, but not actually published until 1831. In his later years, he enlisted the help of Antoine Froment to help with the chronicle.

Other published works include Advis et Devis de la Source de l'Idolatrie et Tryannie Papale, Advis et Devis de Langues (1563), and Advis et Devis sur l'Ancienne et Nouvelle Police de Genève.

In 1551, he donated his considerable library to the public. He left everything to the city of Geneva in his will. He died in 1570 at the age of seventy-seven. His exact date of death is not known because of a gap in the death records of the city.
