= James Esber =

American artist (born 1961)

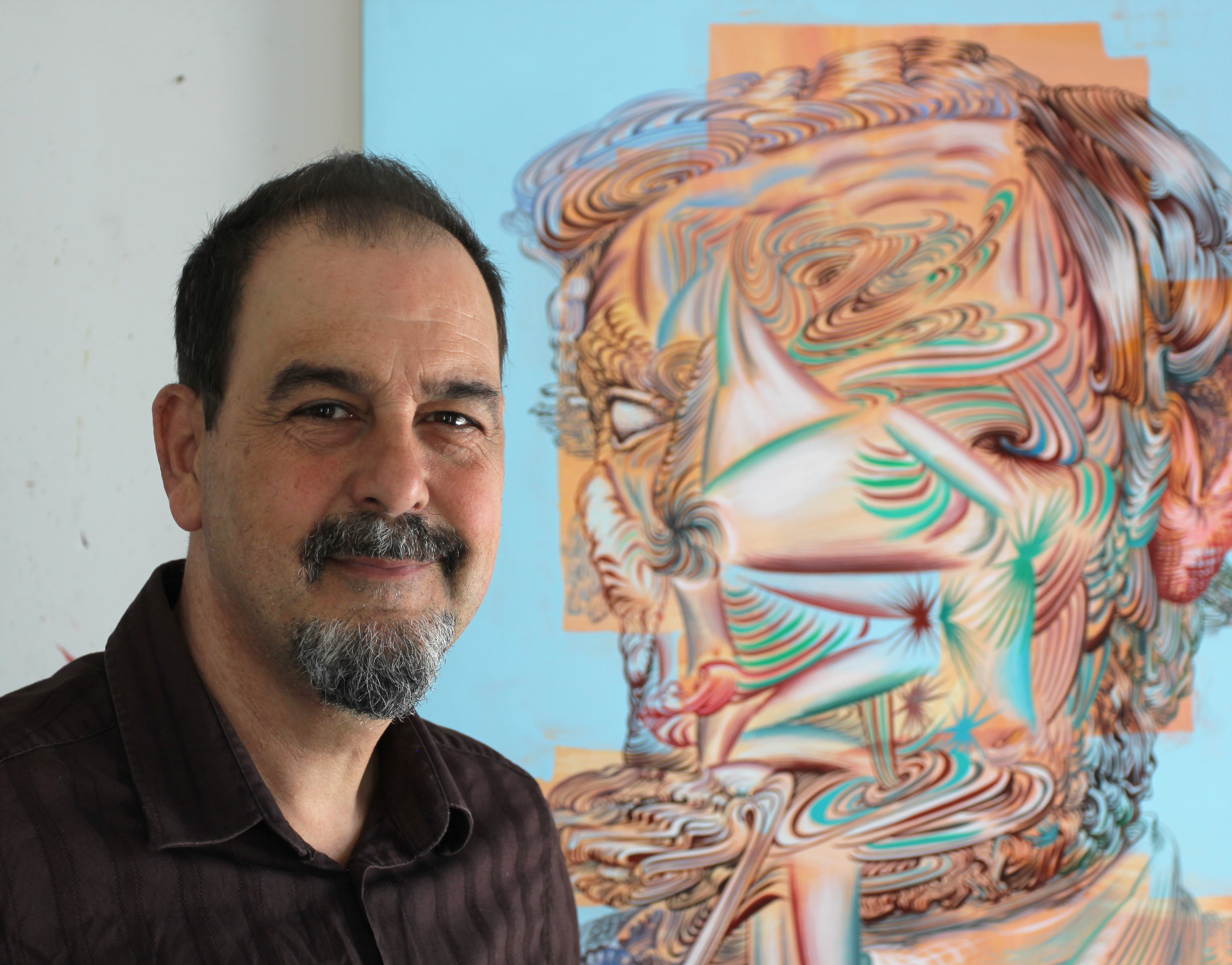
- Born: 1961 (age 64–65); Cleveland, Ohio
- Education: Cleveland Institute of Art, Skowhegan School of Painting and Sculpture, Temple University in Rome
- Style: neo-pop
- Spouse: Jane Fine

James Esber is an artist based in Brooklyn, New York. He is known for paintings that utilize a wide range of materials, including Plasticine, to distort and reconstruct images of American pop culture.

Along with his wife, the artist Jane Fine, he creates collaborative drawings under the pseudonym "J. Fiber".

== Career ==
Esber moved to New York in 1986 and quickly settled in the nascent art community of Williamsburg. He came to prominence as one of only ten artists from New York, including Lisa Yuskavage and John Currin, who were chosen for the Art Under 30: FIAR International Prize, curated by Dan Cameron.

In the early 1990s, Esber completed a series of works called Hate Images, begun while a fellow at the Provincetown Fine Arts Work Center. These paintings transformed images of recognizable stereotypes by distorting them beyond easy recognition, and were similar to the works shown at his first solo exhibition at Pierogi 2000 in Williamsburg. Distortion and plasticity continue to inform Esber's practice, which, described by the artist and critic Drew Lowenstein can be characterized by "grotesque, trippy amalgams on canvas and in plasticine wall adhesions".

Another aspect of this Esber's practice concerns the transformation of presidents Abraham Lincoln and Richard Nixon, which David Geers referred to as a type of historical portraiture in BOMB. Tricky Dick (1997-1998), a flattened and warped cartoon of Richard Nixon, was included in the Pop Surrealism exhibition from 1998 curated by Richard Klein, Dominique Nahas, Harry Philbrick, and Ingrid Schaffner for the Aldrich Museum of Contemporary Art.

Esber is also known for works that involve participatory art practice, including This Is Not a Portrait (2009-2011), in which over a hundred people were tasked with making an ink drawing of Osama bin Laden during the War in Afghanistan.

== Major exhibitions ==
Esber's work has been exhibited nationally and internationally. A retrospective exhibition of his work was held at the Clifford Gallery at Colgate University, where he showed four decades of work. Solo exhibitions have been held at museums and galleries including the Aldrich Contemporary Art Museum, PPOW, and the Southeastern Center for Contemporary Art. Group exhibitions include My Reality: Contemporary Art and the Culture of Japanese Animation at the Brooklyn Museum of Art, Now What? at the Norton Museum of Art, and SITE Santa Fe’s Fifth International Biennial: Disparities and Deformations: Our Grotesque, curated by Robert Storr.

== Awards, fellowships, and residencies ==
- MacDowell, artist residency, Peterborough, New Hampshire (2023, 2001, 1992)
- Yaddo, artist residency, Saratoga Springs, New York (2021, 2012, 1997, 1990)
- Hermitage Artists Retreat, residency, Englewood, Florida (2019, 2017, 2016, 2015)
- New York Foundation for the Arts Fellowship (2008, 2002)
- Pollock-Krasner Foundation Grant (2005)
- Fine Arts Work Center, fellowship, Provincetown, Massachusetts (1991)
- Art Under 30: FIAR International Prize, Milan, Italy, Honorable Mention (1991)

== Selected solo and collaborative exhibitions ==
- Dewey Defeats Truman, Pierogi, New York (2016)
- 87 Ways to Kill Time, Clifford Gallery, Colgate University, Hamilton, New York (2014)
- Your Name Here, Aldrich Contemporary Art Museum, Ridgefield, Connecticut (2011)
- You, Me and Everybody Else, Pierogi, Brooklyn (2010)
- American Delirium, Southeast Center for Contemporary Art, Winston-Salem, North Carolina (2007)
- No Natural Ingredients, Pierogi, Brooklyn, New York (2006)
- James Esber, PPOW (2003)

== Selected group exhibitions ==
- Out of Character (Part II), Mana Contemporary, Jersey City, New Jersey (2023)
- A S K E W, DC Moore Gallery, New York (2022)
- Re: Representation, curated by Dan Cameron, Jonathan Ferrara Gallery, New Orleans (2021)
- Flex, Tang Museum, Skidmore College, Saratoga Springs (2020)
- One Work, Tang Museum, Skidmore College, Saratoga Springs (2014)
- Beasts of Revelation, DC Moore Gallery, New York (2012)
- Thinking Through Drawing: Practice into Knowledge, Macy Art Gallery, Teachers College, Columbia University, New York (catalog) (2011)
- Now What?, Norton Museum of Art, West Palm Beach, Florida (2010)
- Wall Rockets: Contemporary Artists and Ed Ruscha, curated by Lisa Dennison, Buffalo AKG Art Museum, Buffalo, New York (2009)
- In the Land of Retinal Delights: The Juxtapoz Factor, Laguna Art Museum, Laguna Beach, California (2008)
- Art on Paper, Weatherspoon Art Gallery, University of North Carolina at Greensboro (2008)
- Wall Rockets: Contemporary Artists and Ed Ruscha, curated by Lisa Dennison, Flag Art Foundation, New York (2008)
- Mr. President, University Art Museum, University at Albany, State University of New York, Albany, New York (2007)
- Material Pursuits, curated by Evelyn Hankins, Fleming Museum, Burlington, Vermont (2007)
- Next Wave Art, curated by Dan Cameron, Brooklyn Academy of Music, Brooklyn, New York (2007)
- Don’t Know Much About History, Artspace, New Haven (2006)
- Twice Drawn, Part 1, Tang Museum, Skidmore College, Saratoga Springs, New York (2006)
- Twice Drawn, Part 2, Tang Museum, Skidmore College, Saratoga Springs, New York (2006)
- Invitational Exhibition of Painting and Sculpture, American Academy of Arts and Letters, New York (2005)
- Fifth International SITE Santa Fe Biennial: Disparities and Deformations: Our Grotesque, curated by Robert Storr, Santa Fe, New Mexico (2004)
- Open House: Working in Brooklyn, curated by Charlotte Kotik, Brooklyn Museum, Brooklyn (2004)
- The Drawn Page, Aldrich Contemporary Art Museum, Ridgefield, Connecticut (2004)
- Impact: New Mural Projects, PPOW, New York (2004)
- Endless Love, DC Moore Gallery, New York (2004)
- New Economy Painting, ACME Gallery, Los Angeles, California (2002)
- My Reality: Contemporary Art and the Culture of Japanese Animation, curated by Jeff Fleming and Susan Talbot, Des Moines Art Center, Des Moines, Iowa; traveled to the Brooklyn Museum of Art, Brooklyn, New York; Tampa Museum of Art, Tampa, Florida; Contemporary Arts Center, Cincinnati, Ohio; Chicago Cultural Center, Chicago, Illinois; Akron Museum of Art, Akron, Ohio; Norton Museum of Art, West Palm Beach, Florida; and the Huntsville Museum of Art, Huntsville, Alabama (2001)
- Art On Paper, Weatherspoon Art Gallery, University of North Carolina at Greensboro (2000)
- Yaddo Centennial Exhibition, Art in General, New York; traveled to the Hyde Collection, Glens Falls, New York (2000)
- Brooklyn: New Work, Contemporary Arts Center, Cincinnati, Ohio (1999)
- RE: Rauschenberg, Marcel Sitcoske Gallery, San Francisco, California (1999)
- Pop Surrealism, Aldrich Museum of Contemporary Art, Ridgefield, Connecticut (1998)
- Hide And Seek, Bucknell University, Lewisburg, Pennsylvania (1998)
- Working in Brooklyn: Current Undercurrent, Brooklyn Museum, Brooklyn, New York (1997)
- Just What Do You Think You’re Doing, Dave?, WAH (Williamsburg Art and Historical) Center, Brooklyn, New York (1997)
- Painting in an Expanding Field, curated by Saul Ostrow, Bennington College, Bennington, Vermont (1996)
- Maux Faux, Ronald Feldman Fine Arts, New York (1995)
- Faux, Ronald Feldman Fine Arts, New York (1994)
- Salon of the Mating Spiders, Herron Test Site Gallery, Brooklyn, New York (1992)
- FIAR International: Art Under 30, curated by Dan Cameron, Palazzo della Permanente, Milan; travelled to Galleria del Chiostro, Rome; L’Espace Pierre Cardin, Paris; Accademia Italiana della Arti, London; National Academy of Design, New York; and the Wight Art Gallery, University of California, Los Angeles (1991)
- Signs of Landscape, Soho Center for Visual Artists, New York (1989)
- Ten Painters, White Columns, New York (1988)

== Public collections ==
- Norton Museum of Art, West Palm Beach, Florida
- Tang Museum, Skidmore College, Saratoga Springs, New York
- The Museum of Art, Rhode Island School of Design, Providence, Rhode Island
- West Collection, Oaks, Pennsylvania
- Center for Curatorial Studies, Bard College, Annandale-On-Hudson, New York
- Flag Art Foundation Collection, New York
- San Jose Museum of Art, San Jose, California
- Williams College Museum of Art, Williams, Massachusetts
- Hyde Collection, Glenn Falls, New York

== Bibliography ==
- Carey, Brainard (3 June 2010). "Interview with James Esber". Museum of Non-visual Art.
- Geers, David (Fall 2016). "James Esber". BOMB Magazine (137): 156–57.
- Bisbort, Alan (19 May 2011). "The Bin Laden Bounce" (PDF). Hartford Advocate. p. 33. Archived from the original (PDF) on 11 July 2024.
- Miller, Robert (3 May 2011). "A Sudden Shift of History" (PDF). News-Times.
- Smith, Roberta (23 December 2010). "An Artist and His Friends Take on Bin Laden". New York Times.
- Chayka, Kyle (14 December 2010). "Drawings of Portraits of Osama Bin Laden at Pierogi". Hyperallergic.
- Davis, Brendan (February 2009). "James Esber" (PDF). Art Interview Online Magazine.
- Supanick, Jim (4 April 2008). "Makin' Whoopee: A Conversation with J. Fiber, James Esber and Jane Fine with Jim Supanick". The Brooklyn Rail (April 2008).
- Hankins, Evelyn (2007). Material Pursuits (exhibition catalog). Robert Hull Fleming Museum, University of Vermont.
- "Goings On About Town: (Un)natural Selection". New Yorker (30 July 2007).
- Patterson, Tom (28 January 2007). "The Fine Art of Distortion" (PDF). Winston Salem Journal.
