= 124 Ridge Street Gallery =

Art museum

Coordinates: 40.7192°N 73.9828°W

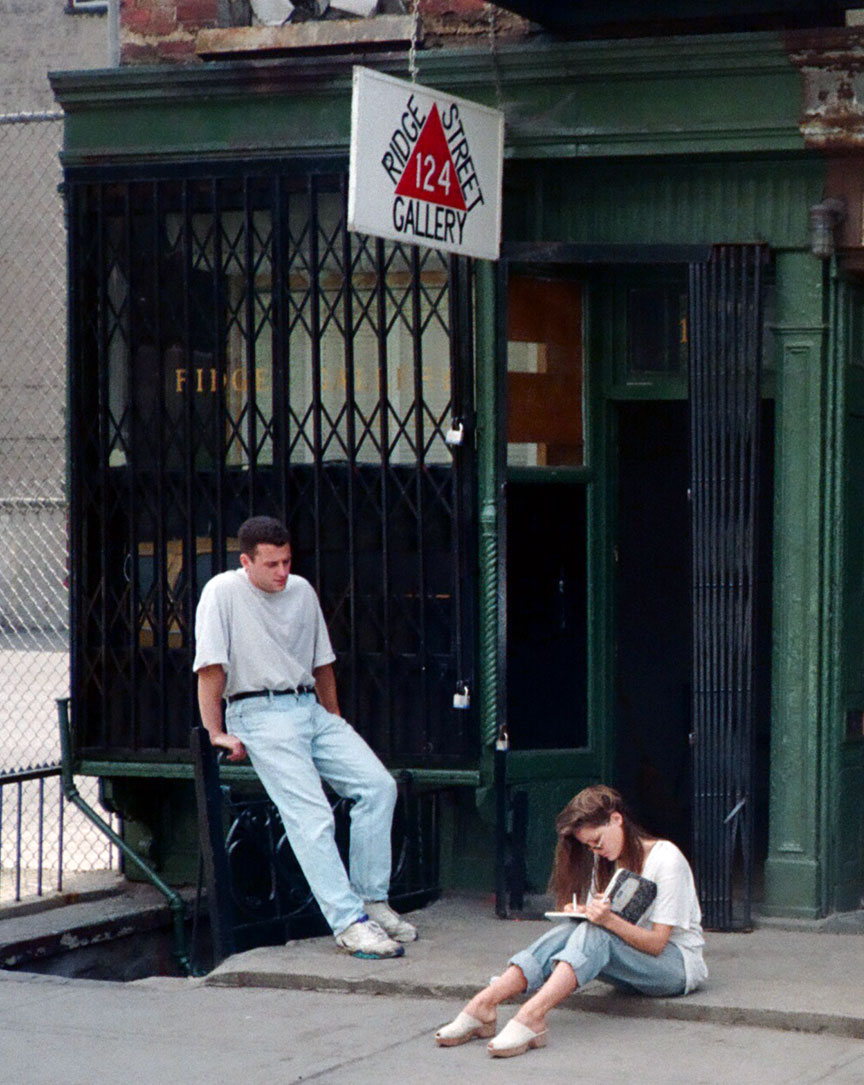
- Exterior view, 1992.
- Interactive map of 124 Ridge Street Gallery
- Location: Manhattan, New York, United States
- Capacity: 30
- Type: Art gallery
- Events: Contemporary art, Underground film

Construction
- Opened: 1985
- Closed: 1997

The 124 Ridge Street Gallery was a collective gallery founded in New York's Lower East Side in 1985. Founding members were Susan Bachemin, Elizabeth Evers, Jane Fine, Matthew Harrison, Michael Kaniecki, Robert McGrath, Heidi Marben, Laurie Olinder, and Joe Vinson. Subsequent members included Amy Berniker, Ruth Pomerantz, Paul Rodriguez, Roger W. Sayre, Ann Shea, Paul Villinski, and Carla Weisberg.

The gallery exhibited art and film from local artists and filmmakers during the 1980s East Village art gallery scene, including Matty Jankowski's 1987 mail art show "The Joke is in the Mail." The film screening series Film Crash was founded at the gallery.

The gallery was closed in 1997.

== Artists exhibited ==
- Michael Abrams
- John Artura
- Tony Atura
- Susan Bachemin
- Maija Beeton
- Amy Berniker
- Evan Brenner
- Daniel Brenner
- Craig Buckbee
- Liz Burns
- Monty Cantsin
- Lauren Chambers
- David Chelsea
- Torture Chorus
- Linus Corraggio
- Sumner Crane
- David Crocker
- Tim Cruse
- Anita Curtis
- Verne Dawson
- Tasha Depp
- Jack Desalvo
- Tracey Dillon
- Jeremy Dine
- Tony DiTerlizzi
- Kate Donnelly
- Lauren Doster
- Eileen Doster
- Leonard Drew
- Matthew Droege
- Osno Endo
- Jim Esber
- Elizabeth Evers
- Madge Evers
- Steve Fairchild
- Toma Fichter
- Jane Fine
- Guilbert Gates
- Darroch Greer
- Rudolph Grey
- Melinda Hackett
- Beth Handler
- Matthew Harrison
- Steven Harvey
- Christy Herron
- Joe Herzfeld
- Bill Hobrecht
- Deborah Holcombe
- Carlton Holmes
- Tim Hunter
- Mizuho Ichioka
- Matty Jankowski
- Kate Johnson
- Michael Kaniecki
- Charles Kohlhase
- Isaac Kosman
- Brandon Krall
- Barbara Kriegh
- Robin Levine
- David Licht
- Bill Lynch
- Anne-Marie Macintyre
- Lisa Mann
- Heidi Marben
- Jerry Marks
- Mill McArthur
- Robert McGrath
- Eva Melas
- Tim Milk
- Susann Minton
- James Monteith
- Ista Mueller
- Adelaide Murphy
- Kestutis Nakas
- Steve Niccolls
- Joe Nunas
- Karl Nussbaum
- Laurie Olinder
- Sarah Oliphant
- Douglas Padgett
- Ethan Phillips
- Jack Pierson
- Jonathan Pierson
- Ruth Pomerantz
- Condy Poorbaugh
- Juan Puntes
- Margaret Riegel
- Mark Rixon
- Rick Rodine
- Paul Rodriguez
- Scott Saunders
- Roger W. Sayre
- David Schlegel
- John Seigurt
- Dan Sevigny
- Ann Shea
- Walter Sipser
- Mary-Paige Snell
- Robert Sussman
- Stow Takeishi
- Tom Venditti
- Paul Villinski
- Joe Vinson
- Melissa Weaver
- Carla Weisberg
- Mike Wilson
- Suzanne Winkler
- Greg Woolard
- Dan Zippi
