= William B. Schade =

American artist (1943 – 2008)

William B. Schade (1943–2008) was an American artist who worked in a wide variety of styles. He created eccentric and colorful images of animals; intricate hand-sewn muslin sculptures containing chickens on architectural bases, and illustrated fold-out books, amongst other types of work. His output depicting animals did not strive for accurate, scientific observation, but rather used artistic license that still allowed for them to be identifiable. The media he used plays an important role in his work. These include handmade paper, paint applied broadly, a distinctive use of drypoint, and stitching that is evident on the cloth sculptures.

== Biographical details ==
William B. Schade was born in Albany, New York in 1943 and was educated at Vincentian Institute and Christian Brothers Academy. He had an undergraduate degree from Southern Illinois University Carbondale and graduate degrees from the State University of New York at Albany (M.A. in printmaking) and the Cranbrook Academy of Art (MFA in printmaking, 1973). He had fellowships from the United States Information Agency and the National Endowment for the Arts, as well as a Fulbright. He had residencies at the MacDowell Colony and Yaddo.

He taught for over thirty years in the art department at The Sage Colleges in Troy and Albany, New York.

Later in life, Schade suffered from both Parkinson's disease and Alzheimers. He died in 2008 in Williamstown, Massachusetts.

== Art work ==
Schade's works focused on animals, both two and three dimensional. His works include drawings, books, drypoints, lithographs, monoprints, paintings, scrolls, temples, sculptures, and furniture.

There were poster-like drawings with the names and descriptions or notable features of each creature. For example, his gouache painting, the Gazza Yam Gaydor (Schade was dyslexic and misspellings are evident in his written notes) is described as "a bad mood reptile." Notes on the work indicate that the tail is "known to smack hippos silly" and the creature eats about "ninety yams a day." His humor is represented throughout his work. His acrylic on linen painting of the Wild Ass Lavender Fowl describes the species:

This breed of chicken was found in the Upper Bronx in 1983, by a city demolishion team, in a abandoned apt. building. The bird numbered at the time about 500. These numbers have drastically dropped, because of the lack of aluminum beer & soda cans on the streets. Since N.Y.S. has passed a returnable container law, cans are no longer thrown around. Which has caused the bird numbers to diminish greatly. For the can was the fowls only source of good old American food."[sic]

Schade used the theme of Noha's (Schade's spelling of Noah's) Ark in a number of his works. These include extremely detailed deck plans of the ark, including the arrangements of the animals and why they are located where they are. He also created a book which describes the many problems Noah faced on the ark, and a series of animal caricatures.

His 2018 exhibit at the Albany Institute of History & Art was described by reviewer William Jaeger: "Almost innocent, nearly childlike, practically playful. William B. Schade's world of invented and exaggerated animals dangles one foot in pure children's book illustration and plants the other in some strange, exquisite zone of the fine arts." Schade, according to one art critic, has a special charm in that he is able to bring laughter to his viewers through his visual depictions, the labels and descriptions on those works, and his misspellings that add extra effect.

While Schade's work is normally quite colorful, his series of fabric sculptures and his sculptures crafted in porcelain are off-white–he used a natural-colored muslin cloth in the case of the fabric sculptures.

== Solo exhibitions ==
- A Menagerie of Whimsey: The Art of William B. Schade. Albany Institute of History & Art. July 14 – December 30, 2018.
- The Last Take Out: Paper Works by William B. Schade. Williams College Museum of Art. July 22 – November 26, 2000.
- The Wild Wonderful World of William Bernard Schade. Art Museum, University at Albany. September 26 – November 14, 1999.
- His work has also been exhibited at the Metropolitan Museum of Art, the Herbert F. Johnson Museum of Art at Cornell University, Dartmouth College, and the Museum of Fine Arts in Springfield, MA.

== Writings ==
- Schade, William B. The Last Takeout. The Chronicle Review. September 8, 2000, p. B23.
