= Matthew Harrison (director) =

American screenwriter, director, and producer

- Harrison at 2008 Cinevegas
- Born: New York City
- Occupations: Film director, screenwriter, producer
- Years active: 1969 to present

Matthew Harrison (born in New York City) is an American television and film director, producer and writer. He first came to prominence when his feature film Rhythm Thief was awarded Special Jury Recognition for Directing at the Sundance Film Festival. His first studio feature Kicked in the Head was executive produced by Martin Scorsese and released by Universal Studios. He directed episodes 1X11 and 1X12 of HBO's Sex and the City.

== Early films ==
Harrison attended PS 41 in downtown Manhattan where he began making 8mm films at age nine. During the 60's, 70's and 80's, Harrison made 8mm and S8mm short films. His first public screening of a film was a 1971 screening of his short S8mm film Mission: Preposterous with an accompanying audio track played using a Wollensak ¼" tape recorder at the Ocean Bay Park Volunteer Fire Department. He completed his undergraduate studies at Cooper Union school of art in New York City. Harrison's 34 minute S8mm film Apartment Eight won Best Comedy at the 1988 New York Film Festival Downtown, was included in Anthology Film Archives “Masters of Super 8” program and received the Mystic Fire Independent Film Award at the 1989 Ann Arbor Film Festival. In 1989 his 27-minute 16mm short film Two Boneheads screened at the Salzburg, Austria Film Festival and was an award winner at the 1990 Long Island Film Festival.

== Film Crash ==
In 1985 Harrison launched a film festival on the Lower East Side, adopting the name Film Crash in early 1988. He was joined later that year by film directors Karl Nussbaum and Scott Saunders. Film Crash grew, playing in venues such as Performance Space 122 and the Angelika Film Center. The festival inaugurated awards in 2014.

== Films for theater ==
During the 1980s and 1990s, Harrison was also a contributing member of the experimental theater group Ridge Theater, producing and directing films for several theater productions, including Jack Benny at La Mama in 1988 and The Manson Family opera at Lincoln Center for the Performing Arts in 1990.

== Feature films ==
In 1992 Harrison's first feature film Spare Me was awarded the Prix Tournage at Avignon Film Festival. He used the cash award from this prize to finance his second feature film Rhythm Thief, which was awarded Special Jury Recognition for Directing at the 1995 Sundance Film Festival. He directed his feature Kicked in the Head for October Films in 1997. Kicked in the Head was executive produced by Martin Scorsese, premiered in the Directors' Fortnight section of the 1997 Cannes Film Festival and was released theatrically by Universal Studios. On June 28, 2006, Harrison premiered his feature film The Deep and Dreamless Sleep at the Avignon Film Festival.

== Television ==
He directed episode 7 of Popular for The WB Television Network and the television show Dead Last for Warner Brothers. According to InkTip.com, Harrison recently optioned the screenplay from screenwriter Anthony Keep, for the original pilot episode of the 30-minute television sitcom "SHOE DOGS".

== Producing ==
In 2002 Harrison executive produced Mark Christensen's debut feature film Box Head Revolution. In 2006 Harrison executive produced Ben Rodkin's debut feature film Big Heart City starring Seymour Cassel and Shawn Andrews.

== Short films ==
Harrison has continued to direct short films. His S8mm short The Bystander From Hell screened at the 1998 Sundance Film Festival and the 1998 Toronto International Film Festival. His S8mm short film Puke screened at the 1999 New York Underground Film Festival. His 16mm short film Wrist screened at the 2000 New York Underground Film Festival and the Bronwyn Keenan Gallery. His short Hey Vendor screened at the 2009 Slamdance Film Festival.

== Music videos ==
Harrison has directed music videos for Lee Curreri, Travis Rush, Evan Clayburn's band Ansel and the Norwegian band Alexandria Quartet.

== Teaching ==
Harrison has taught film at CalArts, American Film Institute, West Los Angeles College, Culver City High School and UCLA Extension Writers' Program.
