= Film Crash =

Annual film festival in California, United States

- Location: Santa Monica, CA, U.S.
- Website: http://www.filmcrash.com/

Film Crash is a California-based annual film festival and screenplay competition, programming independent, animated, experimental, low-budget and underground films. The programmers award prizes.

== History ==
In 1985 film director Matthew Harrison launched a floating film screening series in the East Village, Manhattan, adopting the name Film Crash and its associated logo in early 1988. He was joined later that year by film directors Karl Nussbaum and Scott Saunders.

== Expansion ==
Film Crash grew, playing in venues such as 124 Ridge Street Gallery, Performance Space 122, R.A.P.P. Arts Center, Angelika Film Center, Shooting Gallery, São Paulo Museum of Image and Sound, Hirshhorn Museum in Washington D.C. and Heliotrope Theater in Los Angeles. In 2014 Film Crash was held in Mid-City, Los Angeles on October 22. In 2015 a Screenplay Competition component was added to Film Crash. The 2024 Film Crash festival and screenplay competition was held at the Laemmle Royal Theatre in West Los Angeles on October 12.

== Theater collaboration ==
As a collective of filmmakers, Film Crash also collaborated with the experimental theater group Ridge Theater, producing and directing films for several theater productions including Jack Benny at La Mama in 1988 and The Manson Family opera at Lincoln Center for the Performing Arts in 1990.

== Film production ==
In 2002 Film Crash presented Mark Christensen's debut feature film Box Head Revolution. In 2006 Film Crash produced Ben Rodkin's debut feature film Big Heart City starring Seymour Cassel and Shawn Andrews.

== Film Crash Programs ==
=== 2025 ===
- October 11, 2025 - Laemmle Royal, West Los Angeles
- West Side Walk, Directed by Robert Woolcock, First Prize Short Film
- Composer Bot, Directed by Oktay Ortabasi, First Prize Documentary
- A Poem, Directed by Vasilios Papaioannu, First Prize Experimental Film
- Delulu, Directed by Athan Tom Sklavos, First Prize Drama
- Red Buckets, Directed by Patrick Moser, First Prize Animated Film
- Psychedelic Shack #4 (Afrofuturism), Directed by Karl Nussbaum
- The Age of the Empath, Written by Steve Brown, First Prize 1-Hour Drama Pilot
- Outer Borough, Written by Thomas Loy, First Prize 1/2-Hour Sitcom Pilot
- Captain Antifer and the Mirific Treasure of Kamylk-Pasha, Written by Hakim Benshila, First Prize Action Adventure Screenplay
- Canterbury Trails, Written by Michael Brose, First Prize Comedy Feature Screenplay
- Why Not Her?, Written by Taylor Bartczak, First Prize Dramatic Feature Screenplay
- Dent, Written by Paul Sliwinski, First Prize Horror Screenplay
- The Box, Written by Kristina Van Kirk Hoffman, First Prize Romantic Comedy Screenplay
- Sincerely Departed, Written by Rebecca Leigh, First Prize Dramatic Short Screenplay
- Fugazi, Written by Jeff Kimball, First Prize Thriller Screenplay

=== 2024 ===
- October 12, 2024 - Laemmle Royal, West Los Angeles
- Tehran Is Ours, Directed by Hamideh Azimi, First Prize Animated Film
- Dream Killer, Directed by Patrick Moser, Best Experimental Film
- The Paternal Prism, Directed by Jon Tinsley, First Prize Documentary
- Red Rose Aroma, Directed by Aurel Naqi, Best Drama
- The World After I Die, Directed by Ruiling Tang, First Prize Experimental Film
- EX, Directed by Slavomír Zrebný, First Prize Drama
- The Guilty, Written by Rita Prakash, First Prize 1-Hour Drama Pilot
- My Favorite Narcissist , Written by Diane Thomassin, Michael Miceli, First Prize 1/2-Hour Sitcom Pilot
- Strike, Written by Charles Borg, Johnny Vongnaphone, First Prize Action Adventure Screenplay
- Don't Eat Paper!, Written by Julius Galacki, First Prize Comedy Feature Screenplay
- Copper Town, Written by Rita L Betti, First Prize Dramatic Feature Screenplay
- Malum-The Seven Seals, Written by JTR, First Prize Horror Screenplay
- Ditching Destiny on Halloween, Written by Laura Lewis-Barr, First Prize Romantic Comedy Screenplay
- December to Remember, Written by Melissa Goad, Bob Leone, First Prize Dramatic Short Screenplay
- The Man in the Green Coat, Written by Cindy Lynn Carter, First Prize Thriller Screenplay

=== 2023 ===
- October 14, 2023 - Laemmle Royal, West Los Angeles
- Night Ride from LA, Directed by Martin Gerigk, First Prize Experimental Film
- Suntripping, Directed by Oktay Ortabasi and Scott Saunders
- Nomad, Directed by Reesha Gandhi, Aby Isakov, and Faryal Khan, First Prize Documentary
- Poppy Pop, Directed by Olive Juge, First Prize Animated Film
- Boiz Klub, Directed by Alexis Janae, First Prize Drama
- Letter, Directed by Matthew Harrison
- Psychedelic Ode to Sunshine, Directed by Karl Nussbaum
- Live Love Lunatics, Written by Jamie Stanley, First Prize 1-Hour Drama Pilot
- Iron Phallus, Written by Stephanie Kolar, First Prize 1/2-Hour Sitcom Pilot
- My Mad Madonna, Written by Cinzia Bomoll, First Prize Action Adventure Screenplay
- Sunshine House, Written by NC Ruby, First Prize Comedy Feature Screenplay
- Devotion, Written by Leon McConnell, First Prize Dramatic Feature Screenplay
- Hello, Written by Sophia Lee, First Prize Horror Screenplay
- E.E., Written by Louise Deschamps, First Prize Romantic Comedy Screenplay
- In Spring, The Sun Sets at 7, Written by Catalina Giraldo, First Prize Dramatic Short Screenplay
- Shake Dog Shake, Written by Chas Chang, First Prize Thriller Screenplay

=== 2022 ===
- October 15, 2022 - Laemmle Royal, West Los Angeles
- Parenthesis, Directed by Vasilios Papaioannu, First Prize Experimental Film
- Cristina Zenato and the Reef Shark Connection, Directed by Jason Perryman, First Prize Documentary
- Paw, Directed by Diana Lee Woody, First Prize Comedy
- Al Diaz: Like a Bomb, Directed by Jane Brill, Best Documentary
- Goya Called, Directed by Patrick Moser, First Prize Animated Film
- Cure, Yi Liu, Best Actor
- Cure, Directed by Tina Gu, First Prize Drama
- The Lavender Jungle, Written by Jon Davis, First Prize 1-Hour Drama Pilot
- B is for Bisexual, Written by Laura Valtorta, First Prize 1/2-Hour Sitcom Pilot
- Chaos Becomes Us, Written by Rachel Rios, Best 1/2-Hour Sitcom Pilot
- Major League Priest, Written by Frank Vespe, Finalist 1/2-Hour Sitcom Pilot
- Memory, Written by Milo Ellison, Semi-Finalist 1/2-Hour Sitcom Pilot
- Bloodlines: The Mogadishu Diaries 1992-1993, Written by Eddie Clay Thompkins III, First Prize Action Adventure Screenplay
- Three Unwishes, Written by Troy Harvey Graham, First Prize Comedy Feature Screenplay
- Pretty Doesn't Get You Into The NBA, Written by Frank Vespe, First Prize Dramatic Feature Screenplay
- Quiet Noise, Written by George Basiev, First Prize Horror Screenplay
- 10 Years Ago Today, Written by Shane Spiegel and Justin Reager, First Prize Romantic Comedy Screenplay
- East of Lincoln Blvd., Written by Sophia Louisa Lee, Best Dramatic Short Screenplay
- Hot Rates to Omaha, Written by David-Matthew Barnes, Finalist Dramatic Short Screenplay
- Mermaid, Written by Jerry D. Ochoa, First Prize Dramatic Short Screenplay
- Apache, Written by Adam Seidel, First Prize Thriller Screenplay

=== 2021 ===
- October 16, 2021 - Laemmle Royal, West Los Angeles
- Moorriiss the Robot, Directed by Wade Chitwood, First Prize Comedy
- Two Little People, Directed by Xin Li, First Prize Animated Film
- Valley of Flowers, Directed by Emma Asson, Suno Chen, Sophia Nino, First Prize Documentary
- Duet, Directed by Yadid Licht, Best Animated Film
- 21, Directed by Damian Gonzalez & Jeremy Weinstein, First Prize Short Film
- The Yes Yes Fish, Directed by Patrick Moser, First Prize Experimental Film
- Sucking Wind, Emerson Thomas-Gregory, Best Actor
- Sucking Wind, Directed by Ruby Baker & David Kennedy, First Prize Drama
- The Twelve Chairs, Written by Gregg Greenberg & Michael Rispoli, First Prize 1-Hour Drama Pilot
- Mobnoxious, Written by Frank Vespe, First Prize 1/2-Hour Sitcom Pilot
- As Time Goes By, Written by Jon Davis, First Prize Action Adventure Screenplay
- A Florida Man, Written by Kaido Strange, First Prize Comedy Feature Screenplay
- Westend, Written by Michał Szalonek & Paweł Podlejski, First Prize Dramatic Feature Screenplay
- The Calling, Written by Steven Bogart, First Prize Horror Screenplay
- Bad Romance, Written by Chad Wellinger, First Prize Romantic Comedy Screenplay
- Over and Out, Written by Callie LeClaire, First Prize Dramatic Short Screenplay
- Burn Pattern, Written by Laura Kemp, First Prize Thriller Screenplay

=== 2020 ===
- October 31, 2020 - Online event (due to COVID-19)
- In the Same Direction, Directed by Alexander Craven, First Prize Documentary
- Starfish, Directed by Alicia Buckner, Best Film
- Just a Ride, Directed by Ben Mathie & Becca Godwin, First Prize Experimental Film
- Junior, Directed by Jehnovah Carlisle, First Prize Drama
- A Shore, Directed by Sam Gilberg & Armand Dov Brescia, First Prize Short Film
- The Winter, Directed by Xin Li, First Prize Animated Film
- The Givers, Written by Ruben Estremera & Gregory Wolk, First Prize 1-Hour Drama Pilot
- Currently Katie, Written by Hannah Petosa, First Prize 1/2-Hour Sitcom Pilot
- Stand-Ups, Written by Ruben Estremera & Gregory Wolk, Best 1/2-Hour Sitcom Pilot
- The Seeds We Sow, Written by Scott Harbison, First Prize Action Adventure Screenplay
- Merry Murder, Written by Eric Lambden, First Prize Comedy Feature Screenplay
- Hole Set, Written by Kyle Smith, First Prize Dramatic Feature Screenplay
- At The Mercy of Faith, Written by Samuel Taylor, First Prize Horror Screenplay
- The Officiant , Written by Carla Miles, First Prize Romantic Comedy Screenplay
- Vodoun, Written by Stuart Creque, First Prize Dramatic Short Screenplay
- Cellular Memory, Written by Brian Erwin, First Prize Thriller Screenplay

=== 2019 ===
- October 12, 2019 - Laemmle Royal , West Los Angeles
- Two, Directed by Vasilios Papaioannu, First Prize Experimental Film
- Something Round, Jason Green, Best Actor
- Something Round, Directed by Nikhail Asnani, First Prize Drama
- Kaki No Shizuku, Directed by Daisy Dickinson, First Prize Experimental Film
- The Dressing, Directed by Patrick Moser, First Prize Experimental Drama
- Florise: The Beauty of Haiti, Directed by Albert Rano, First Prize Documentary
- Transference, Directed by James Jaffee, First Prize Experimental Film
- Swank's!, Written by Ed Bookman, First Prize Dramatic Feature Screenplay
- Polymer, Written by Matthew Karges, First Prize Dramatic Short Screenplay
- High Striker, Written by Gerald Rigdon, First Prize Thriller Screenplay
- It's Here, Written by Judson Vaughan, First Prize Horror Screenplay
- Born Again, Written by Daniel Schooling, First Prize Comedy Feature Screenplay
- Rainbow Hunting, Written by Conor McFarland, First Prize Romantic Comedy Screenplay
- Light, Written by Michael Schilf, First Prize 1-Hour Drama Pilot
- Board to Death, Written by Steve Stiefel and Jodi Teti, First Prize 1/2-Hour Sitcom Pilot
- Resurrection Run, Written by Sean Mick, First Prize Action Adventure Screenplay

=== 2018 ===
- October 13, 2018 - Laemmle Royal , West Los Angeles
- Illusion, Directed by Yedan Zhu, First Prize Student Animated Film
- The Midpoint of a Very Long Story, Directed by Ertug Tufekcioglu, First Prize Drama
- My Heart is a Lure, Directed by Patrick Moser, First Prize Experimental Film
- Move, Directed by David Stenseth, First Prize Student Documentary
- Voice, Directed by Takeshi Kushida, First Prize Experimental Drama
- College Nomad, Directed by Albert Rano, First Prize Documentary
- The Hyacinth Girl, Julia Rock, Best Actor
- The Hyacinth Girl, Directed by Marielle Heydt, First Prize Best Movie
- Until We Reach The Sun, Directed by Daisy Dickinson, First Prize Animated Film
- Did You Hear?, Written by Joseph Harrison, First Prize Romantic Comedy Screenplay
- The Color Of Evil, Written by Connie Wilson, First Prize Horror Screenplay
- The Cottages, Written by John Darbonne, First Prize Web/New Media Screenplay
- Back Home, Written by Matthew Baker, First Prize Comedy Feature Screenplay
- Egalité, Written by Michael Head, First Prize 1-Hour Drama Pilot
- 'Til Death, Written by Alexandra Marshall, First Prize Dramatic Short Screenplay
- Paradise Pond, Written by Lorraine Portman, First Prize Thriller Screenplay
- The Mushroom King, Written by Steve Trebilcock, First Prize Action Adventure Screenplay
- Delivery Girl, Written by Katherine Grant Krieger, First Prize Dramatic Feature Screenplay
- My Life With Cats, Written by Bear Kosik, First Prize 1/2-Hour Sitcom Pilot

=== 2017 ===
- October 14, 2017 - Laemmle Royal , West Los Angeles
- Stars, Directed by Han Zhang, First Prize Animated Film
- The Locket, Directed by Spencer Henry Williams, First Prize Student Film
- A Universal Love Story, Directed by Natalie MacMahon, First Prize Short Film
- Voices From Kaw Thoo Lei, Directed by Martha Gorzycki, First Prize Documentary
- Corridory, Directed by Matt Meindl, First Prize Experimental Film
- Penny and Paul, Directed by Brian Rawlins, First Prize Drama
- Penny and Paul, Benjamin Schrader, Best Actor
- The Girls in the House, Written by Tara Leigh, First Prize 1-Hour Drama Pilot
- Blood Trigger, Written by Ron Podell, First Prize Action Adventure Screenplay
- Gamers, Written by Travis Lemke, Jury Prize Comedy Feature Screenplay
- What Goes Up Must Come Down, Written by Nicholas Zingarelli, First Prize Dramatic Feature Screenplay
- Blood Knots, Written by Gregg Malkoff, First Prize Horror Screenplay
- A World Without Men, Written by Malachi Kaplan, First Prize Romantic Comedy Screenplay
- A Run, Written by Dagomir Kaszlikowski, First Prize Dramatic Short Screenplay
- Malicious Intent, Written by Mike Briock, First Prize Thriller Screenplay

=== 2016 ===
- October 22, 2016 - MiMoDa Studio , Los Angeles
- Aeon, Directed by Derek O'Dell, First Prize Animated Film
- Heaven is Now , Directed by Audrey Lorea, First Prize Feature Film
- Atomic Couple, Directed by Rodrigo Espinosa, First Prize Comedy Short
- Competition, Directed by Artur Boruzs, First Prize Student Short
- Retreat Hell, Directed by Riley Robbins, Best Actor Short Film for "Jonathan Medina "
- The Dabbler Man, Directed by Mario Horton, First Prize Dramatic Short
- After the Storm, Directed by Felix Tobin, First Prize Experimental Short
- Dead Van Drivin', Directed by Drew Morris, First Prize Documentary
- Asomnia, Written by Stuart Creque, First Prize 1-Hour Drama Pilot
- Vijay, Written by J. Panchalingam, First Prize 1/2-Hour Sitcom Pilot
- Luther's Gang, Written by Massimiliano Mauceri, First Prize Action Adventure Screenplay
- The World Lifeguard Championship, Written by J. J. Wheeler, Jury Prize Comedy Feature Screenplay
- The Winner Mindset, Written by Doug Jacobson, First Prize Comedy Feature Screenplay
- Big Sister, Written by David Chester, First Prize Dramatic Feature Screenplay
- Nicole, Her Ex & The Killer, Written by Bob Akins, First Prize Horror Screenplay
- Devil's Portal, Written by Frank del Aguila, First Prize Best Los Angeles Screenplay
- Male Delivery, Written by Paul Penley, First Prize Romantic Comedy Screenplay
- Dinosaur, Written by Frederik With-Seidelin Skov, First Prize Dramatic Short Screenplay
- Cajun Justice, Written by Mike Briock, First Prize Thriller Screenplay

=== 2015 ===
- November 15, 2015 - MiMoDa Studio , Los Angeles
- WildLike, Directed by Frank Hall Green, Best Feature Film
- Best before end..., Directed by Nicolas Fogliarini, Best Short Film
- Vessels, Directed by Arkasha Stevenson, Grand Jury Prize & Best Student Short Film
- The Little Match Girl, Directed by Kyoko Yamashita, Best Animated Film
- Italian Justice, Directed by Marzio Mirabella, Best Web/New Media
- Lapsus, Directed by Karim Ouaret, Best Thriller Short Film
- Within, Directed by Natalia Azevedo Andrade, Best Student Animated Film
- Tak Chung Wu, Directed by Tyler Russo, Best Documentary
- September 26, 2015 - Undisclosed Venice Location, Los Angeles
- Who I Am Now, Written by L Elizabeth Powers, First Prize Dramatic Screenplay
- The Body, Written by Sally Shepard, First Prize Comedy Feature Screenplay
- Luis & Madeline, Written by Alain Alfaro, First Prize Romantic Comedy Screenplay
- Raven Winters and the Spirit Vortex, Written by Heather Ostrove, First Prize Action Adventure Screenplay
- Children of the Dead, Written by Jeff Bassetti, First Prize Horror Screenplay
- Lilac, Written by Hank Isaac, First Prize Web/New Media Screenplay
- Bogus Family Vacation, Written by Sundae Jahant-Osborn, First Prize Best Los Angeles Screenwriter
- When You Wish, Written by Troy Graham, First Prize Dramatic Short Screenplay
- You Love Me Why?, Written by John Patishnock, First Prize Comedy Short Screenplay

=== 2014 ===
- October 19, 2014 - MiMoDa Studio , Los Angeles
- Niko, Directed by Ilgar Ozturk, First Prize Thriller Short
- Bittersweet Monday, Directed by Jaime Lee, First Prize Feature Film
- I Know You, Directed by Colin Gerrard, Jury Prize Short Film
- The Caramel Corn Riot, Directed by Guang Cheng Shie, First Prize Short Film
- November, Directed by Eric Esser, First Prize Student Short
- Flavor & Fuel - A Story Of Modern Craftsmanship Produced by Matthew Woodget, First Prize Web/New Media
- Butterfly Fluttering, Directed by Roman Kayumov, Jury Prize Narrative Short

=== 2007 ===
- December 3, 2007 - Echo Park Film Center, Los Angeles
- Elements, Directed by Andrew Blackwood
- The Hesher, Directed by Scott Cummings
- Last Albino Peacock, Directed by Matthew Harrison
- Palm Trees Down 3rd St., Directed by Maria Judice
- Sleazeball, Directed by Joe Paule
- Untitled, Directed by Ben Rodkin
- The Killing Jar, Directed by Aion Velie

=== 1998 ===
- December 16, 1998 - Unterfuton Studios, New York City
- Eureka, Directed by Matthew Harrison
- Purge, Directed by Marc Finkel
- Doctor Loud, Directed by Adam Goldstein

=== 1997 ===
- June 20, 1997 - Den of Cin , New York City
- Bootleg Film Crash Intro, Directed by Matthew Harrison
- Caring For Your Cat, Directed by Matthew Harrison
- West Side Evan, Directed by Matthew Harrison
- Losing Screws, Directed by Kazuho Ohno
- How The Museum Of Natural History Caught The Brontosaurus, Directed by Matthew Harrison
- February 21, 1997 - Den of Cin , New York City
- Rape of Tiprin Slide Show
- Commons Tahiti Footage
- Uncle Hans And The Hamster, Directed by Kirsten
- Nightmare On Water Street, Directed by Matthew Harrison
- Around New York With Harry Zuno, Directed by Matthew Harrison
- Farp Man, Directed by Matthew Harrison
- Color Ade, Directed by Matthew Harrison
- Robin Pillage, Directed by Matthew Harrison
- Finger, Directed by Jennifer Sheppard

=== 1993 ===
- December 8, 1993 - Shooting Gallery, New York City
- Program lost

=== 1992 ===
- August 20, 1992 - São Paulo Museum of Image and Sound, São Paulo, Brazil
- The Man Who Invented The Twinkie, Directed by Karl Nussbaum & Scott Saunders
- Off The Roof, Directed by Susie Klein
- Rupture, Directed by Marcus Fernandez and Emmanuelle Bernard
- Two Boneheads, Directed by Matthew Harrison
- The Beating Chamber, Directed by Scott Saunders
- Lost Avenues, Directed by Bill Morrison
- The Steep And Thorny Way, Directed by Susie Klein
- The Grass Suit, Directed by Gene Pool and Karl Nussbaum
- Purge, Directed by Marc Finkel
- January 12, 1992 - Anthology Film Archives, New York City
- Rupture, Directed by Marcus Fernandez and Emmanuelle Bernard
- Craps, Directed by Rick Rodine
- Dr. Fisher, Directed by (unknown)
- Purge, Directed by Marc Finkel
- The Beating Chamber, Directed by Scott Saunders
- Lost Avenues, Directed by Bill Morrison
- Time Expired, Directed by Danny Leiner
- The Steep And Thorny Way, Directed by Susie Klein
- The Grass Suit, Directed by Gene Pool and Karl Nussbaum

=== 1991 ===
- September 27, 1991 - Angelika Film Center, New York City
- Rupture, Directed by Marcus Fernandez and Emmanuelle Bernard
- Film Crash Intro, Directed by Finkel Nussbaum
- The Beating Chamber, Directed by Scott Saunders
- Lost Avenues, Directed by Bill Morrison
- Time Expired, Directed by Danny Leiner
- Her Fragrant Emulsion, Directed by Lewis Klahr
- The Steep And Thorny Way, Directed by Susie Klein
- The Grass Suit, Directed by Gene Pool and Karl Nussbaum
- Soma Sema, Directed by Bradley Eros and Jeanne Liotta
- September 27, 1991 - Limelight, New York City
- Three, Directed by Matthew Harrison
- March 21, 1991 - Hirshhorn Museum, Washington D.C.
- Two Boneheads, Directed by Matthew Harrison
- Purge, Directed by Marc Finkel
- The Man Who Invented The Twinkie, Directed by Karl Nussbaum & Scott Saunders
- Off The Roof, Directed by Susie Klein
- Covered In Fleas, Directed by Ruth Peyser
- January 21, 1991 - Sundance Film Festival Bootleg Film Crash, Park City, Utah
- Spare Me, Directed by Matthew Harrison

=== 1990 ===
- September 27, 1990 - Kampo Cultural Center, New York City
- Program lost
- July 13, 1990 - 124 Ridge Street Gallery, New York City
- Program lost
- June 29, 1990 - Angelika Film Center, New York City
- Film Crash Goes West, Directed by Karl Nussbaum & Scott Saunders
- Visje Een, Visje Twee, Visje Visje In De Zee, Directed by Kim Niekerk
- Rose Married A Junkie, Directed by Laura Margulies
- Two Boneheads, Directed by Matthew Harrison
- Snowfield, Directed by Bill Morrison
- The Man Who Invented The Twinkie, Directed by Karl Nussbaum & Scott Saunders
- Purge, Directed by Marc Finkel
- Tracks, Directed by Rupert A. Nadeau
- The Lights Are Out But It's Still Too Bright, Directed by Susie Klein
- June 7, 1990 - Heliotrope Theater, Los Angeles
- Film Crash Kids, Directed by Karl Nussbaum
- Snowfield, Directed by Bill Morrison
- Mother Of Wolves, Directed by Peter Mark D'Auria
- Visje Een, Visje Twee, Visje Visje In De Zee, Directed by Kim Niekerk
- Shark Show, Directed by Scott Levy
- Where I'm Coming From, Directed by Scott Saunders
- Jimmy And Red, Directed by Megan Daniels
- Hotel Du Heartbreak, Directed by Adam Green
- Bootleg Film Crash, Directed by Matthew Harrison
- Rose Married A Junkie, Directed by Laura Margulies
- Cityscrapes, Directed by Michael Becker
- Civic Fiesta, Directed by Scott Saunders
- Infarct, Directed by Nino Rodriguez
- Ken And Barbie Get Married, Directed by Michael Haddad
- Sand Castle Intro, Directed by Matthew Harrison
- Two Boneheads, Directed by Matthew Harrison
- Film Five, Directed by Eva Schicker and Ethan Petit
- Manson Promo, Directed by Karl Nussbaum
- The Man Who Invented The Twinkie, Directed by Karl Nussbaum and Scott Saunders
- June 6, 1990 - Heliotrope Theater, Los Angeles
- The Scream, Directed by Karl Nussbaum
- Off The Roof, Directed by Susie Klein
- Purge, Directed by Marc Finkel
- A Bitter Message Of Hopeless Grief, Directed by Jonathan Reiss
- Covered In Fleas, Directed by Ruth Peyser
- Ultimate Goal, Directed by Matthew Harrison
- What God Did On His First Day Off, Directed by Karl Nussbaum
- Tracks, Directed by Rupert A. Nadeau
- Western Sources, Directed by Scott Saunders
- Two Boneheads, Directed by Matthew Harrison
- Made In Manhattan, Directed by Vincent Reilly
- Manson Promo, Directed by Karl Nussbaum
- The Man Who Invented The Twinkie, Directed by Karl Nussbaum and Scott Saunders
- The Affair, Directed by Francine Douwes
- Blue Moon, Directed by Bradley Eros and Jeanne Liotta
- Zippo, Directed by Larry Fessenden
- Cerebral Paisley, Directed by Brian Carroll
- Futility, Directed by Greta Snider
- April 7, 1990 - Brand Name Damages, Williamsburg, Brooklyn
- Consumed, Directed by Matthew Harrison
- Program lost
- April 2, 1990 - Performance Space 122, New York City
- The Mission, Directed by Karl Nussbaum
- Snowfield, Directed by Bill Morrison
- Rads, Directed by Eddie Freeze
- Open Sesame, Directed by Bradley Eros and Jeanne Liotta
- Hemi-Cuda, Directed by Karl Nussbaum
- Tennis Match, Directed by Matthew Harrison
- Laurie Painting No. 1, Directed by Matthew Harrison
- Where I'm Coming From, Directed by Scott Saunders
- Jimmy And Red, Directed by Megan Daniels
- Random Positions, Directed by Jo Bonney and Ruth Peyser
- Ken And Barbie Get Married, Directed by Michael Haddad
- Free Your Ass And Your Mind Will Follow, Directed by Karl Nussbaum
- March 20, 1990 - Dance Theater Workshop, New York City
- Program lost
- March 3, 1990 - Brand Name Damages, Williamsburg, Brooklyn
- Program lost
- January 21, 1990 - Gas Station 2B, New York City
- Hot Pink Messages From Christ, Directed by Matthew Harrison
- The Affair, Directed by Francine Douwes
- The Man Who Invented The Twinkie, Directed by Karl Nussbaum and Scott Saunders
- Two Boneheads, Directed by Matthew Harrison
- January 13, 1990 - 124 Ridge Street Gallery, New York City
- Program lost
- January 11, 1990 - Screening on side of building, East Village, New York City
- Program lost
- January 8, 1990 - Performance Space 122, New York City
- Shooting Gallery, Directed by Bill Morrison
- Bootleg Film Crash Intro., Directed by Matthew Harrison
- Dedicated Underground, Directed by Scott Saunders
- Part Of Your Loving, Directed by Tony DeNonno
- Zippo, Directed by Larry Fessenden
- Son Of Man, Directed by Karl Nussbaum
- The Filmers Almanac Multi-Projection, Directed by Owen O'Toole
- Hot Pink Messages From Christ, Directed by Matthew Harrison
- Purge, Directed by Marc Finkel
- The Affair, Directed by Francine Douwes
- January 3, 1990 - Max Fish, New York City
- The Man Who Invented The Twinkie, Directed by Karl Nussbaum and Scott Saunders
- Two Boneheads, Directed by Matthew Harrison

=== 1989 ===
- November 6, 1989 - Performance Space 122, New York City
- Matt's Phone Call, Directed by Matthew Harrison
- Address To The Assembled Masses, Directed by Scott Saunders
- Dedicated Underground, Directed by Scott Saunders
- The Lights Are Out, But It's Still Too Bright, Directed by Susie Klein
- Swingin' In The Painter's Room, Directed by Greg Mottola
- Pulsate, Directed by Andrea Beeman
- Stiff, Directed by Larry Fessenden
- The Afterlife Of Grandpa, Directed by P.J. Pesce
- Yosef And His Amazing Technicolor Yawn, Directed by Robert Carobene
- Two Boneheads, Directed by Matthew Harrison
- September 11, 1989 - Performance Space 122, New York City
- Film Crash Intro, Directed by Matthew Harrison
- Brains, Directed by David Flanigan
- The Dreamer Never Sleeps, Directed by Peter Mark D'Auria
- Mom, Directed by George Kuchar
- Visje Een, Visje Twee, Visje, Visje In De Zee, Directed by Kim Niekerk
- Composed, Directed by Adam Lichtenstein
- One Nation Under T.V., Directed by Ruth Peyser
- Consumed, Directed by Matthew Harrison
- The Man Who Invented The Twinkie, Directed by Karl Nussbaum and Scott Saunders
- June 14, 1989 - Performance Space 122, New York City
- Film Crash Intro, Directed by Karl Nussbaum
- Off The Roof, Directed by Susie Klein
- Missing Home, Directed by Scott Saunders
- Sunshine Superman, Directed by Richard Rutkowski
- Hotel Du Heartbreak, Directed by Adam Green
- Reserection, Directed by Bill Morrison
- The Man Who Invented The Twinkie Trailer, Directed by Karl Nussbaum and Scott Saunders.
- Two Boneheads, Directed by Matthew Harrison
- April 18, 1989 - Performance Space 122, New York City
- Film Crash Intro, Directed by Chris Burke and Scott Saunders
- Political Spots, Directed by Chris Burke and Scott Saunders
- The Blue Bouquet, Directed by Angelo Restivo
- Covered In Fleas, Directed by Ruth Peyser
- A Book Report, Directed by Star Drooker
- Mother Of Wolves, Directed by Peter Mark D'Auria
- Mass And Masses, Directed by Marko with sound Directed by Steve Jones
- Lunch, Directed by Matthew Harrison
- Coming Attraction, Directed by Karl Nussbaum and Scott Saunders.
- January 18, 1989 - Performance Space 122, New York City
- Film 5, Directed by Eva Schicker with lecture by Ethan Pettit
- The Next Modern World, Directed by Scott Saunders
- Cerebral Paisley, Directed by Brian Carroll
- In Search Of The Pope's Libido, Directed by Karl Nussbaum
- Who Do You Think You Are?, Directed by Mary Filipo
- Ultimate Goal, Directed by Matthew Harrison
- Spiral, Directed by Emily Breer
- Election Night, Directed by Star Drooker and Robert Vuolo

=== 1988 ===
- November 12, 1988 - Gusto House, New York City
- Three, Directed by Matthew Harrison
- The Thunder Of Airplanes, Directed by Scott Saunders
- In Search Of The Pope's Libido, Directed by Karl Nussbaum
- September 24, 1988 - 124 Ridge Street Gallery, New York City
- Program lost
- July 7, 1988 - Cafe Bustelo, New York City
- Santaphobia, Directed by Matthew Harrison
- Tilt-A-Whirl, Directed by Karl Nussbaum
- Safe House, Directed by Adam Ben-Ari
- Traffic Jam, Directed by John Duffy
- The Thunder Of Airplanes, Directed by Scott Saunders
- What God Did On His First Day Off, Directed by Karl Nussbaum
- Apartment Eight, Directed by Matthew Harrison
- Cacklefruit, Directed by Gregory Wendt
- En Passant, Directed by Scott Galliard
- Interior Decorator From Hell, Directed by Sonia Roth
- The Big Itch, Directed by Patricia Crevits
- May 26, 1988 - Cafe Bustelo, New York City
- Man Prays To See Four Things Clearly, Directed by Mike Pratt
- That Horrible Itching, Directed by Scott Saunders
- American Standard, Directed by Tom Kincaid
- Shake It, Directed by Oliver Potterton
- The Shave, Directed by Howard Krupa
- Nazi Girls From Planet Debbie, Directed by Brian Carroll
- Mister Brain, Directed by Matthew Harrison
- Shark Show Coney Island, Directed by Scott Levy
- Coney Island Short, Directed by Scott Saunders
- Sleazy Rider, Directed by Jon Moritsugu
- May 22, 1988 - Socrates Art Park, Williamsburg, Brooklyn
- Consumed, Directed by Matthew Harrison
- Program lost
- April 16, 1988 - 124 Ridge Street Gallery, New York City
- Long Hot Lusty Night, Directed by Brian Carroll
- Your Dreams Can Kill You, Directed by Karl Nussbaum
- Slice Of Life, Directed by Karl Nussbaum
- Loft Rockin', Directed by Matthew Harrison
- How The Museum Of Natural History Caught The Brontosaurus, Directed by Matthew Harrison
- White Noise, Directed by Peter Lehner
- Shark Show Coney Island, Directed by Scott Levy
- Dying Film, Directed by Oliver Potterton
- Rock Trow, Directed by Jon Delapa
- Untitled, Directed by Star Drooker
- Untitled, Directed by Kevin McCarthy
- Untitled, Directed by Lars Fuchs
- March 19, 1988 - 124 Ridge Street Gallery, New York City
- Chimera, Directed by Brian Carroll
- Sex Ghost, Directed by Brian Carroll
- Opera Ontologica, Directed by Schicker & Pettit
- Jelmi In Rio, Directed by Byron Black
- Untitled, Directed by Star Drooker
- Big Box, Directed by Matthew Harrison
- Consumed, Directed by Matthew Harrison
- Real Master Reel, Directed by Gina Giobbo
- Love And Industry, Directed by Scott Saunders
- Cliche City, Directed by Andrew S. Price
- February 18, 1988 - 124 Ridge Street Gallery, New York City
- Program lost
- February 12, 1988 - Minor Injury Gallery, New York City
- Hat Or Hair, Directed by Richard Turtletaub
- Your Dreams Can Kill You, Directed by Karl Nussbaum
- Consumed, Directed by Matthew Harrison
- Death Down By The River, Directed by Eva Schicker
- Cubo Glitz, Directed by Ethan Pettit
- January 22, 1988 - 124 Ridge Street Gallery, New York City
- Dog In A Dish, Directed by Matthew Harrison
- Consumed, Directed by Matthew Harrison
- Homeless, Directed by Evan Brenner
- Sugar Shards, Directed by Rick Rodine

=== 1987 ===
- November 21, 1987 - RAPP Arts Center , New York City
- Blue, Directed by Schicker & Pettit
- All Wound Up, Directed by Linda Morgenstern
- Caring For Your Cat, Directed by Matthew Harrison
- Love's Choice, Directed by Dayton Taylor
- Loraen, Directed by Mark Richardson
- Love And Industry, Directed by Scott Saunders
- Apartment Eight, Directed by Matthew Harrison
- Monroe, Directed by Gina Stone
- The Birthday Fish, Directed by Alex Zamm
- Your Dreams Can Kill You, Directed by Karl Nussbaum
- Video, Directed by John Jackles
- November 14, 1987 - 124 Ridge Street Gallery, New York City
- Program lost
- November 1, 1987 - Gas Station 2B, New York City

The Rivington School vs The Gas Station, Directed by Linus Coraggio

- September 10, 1987 - 124 Ridge Street Gallery, New York City
- Program lost
- July 10, 1987 - RAPP Arts Center, New York City
- Walls, Directed by Patience Prescott
- Cliche City, Directed by Andrew S. Price
- Opera Ontologica, Directed by Schicker & Pettit
- Hat Or Hair, Directed by Richard Turtletaub
- Silk Scarf Trailer, Directed by Frank Pace
- Animal Love, Directed by Draper Shreeve
- Jam, Directed by Dave Brody
- Apartment Eight, Directed by Matthew Harrison
- May 16, 1987 - RAPP Arts Center, New York City
- Waking Up Crazy, Directed by Matthew Harrison
- Untitled, Directed by Eva Schicker
- Damsell Distress, Directed by Matthew Harrison
- Shark Short, Directed by Larry Fessenden
- Untitled, Directed by Richard Turtletaub
- Stiff, Directed by Larry Fessenden
- Park Short, Directed by Monty Cantsin
- White Trash, Directed by Larry Fessenden
- Dance Film, Directed by Howie
- May 1, 1987 - 124 Ridge Street Gallery, New York City
- Program lost
- March 13, 1987 - 124 Ridge Street Gallery, New York City
- Program lost
- February 27, 1987 - RAPP Arts Center, New York City
- Three Ryhmes, Directed by Jay Bachemin
- Untitled Shark Short, Directed by Larry Fessenden
- Laurie Olinder Painting No. 2, Directed by Matthew Harrison
- Three, Directed by Matthew Harrison
- Nightmare On Water St., Directed by Matthew Harrison
- No Answer, Directed by Anna Hurwitz
- Etude, Directed by Frank Pace
- Blind Man, Directed by Andrew S. Price
- Gothic Gardens, Directed by Brian Segal
- Untitled, Directed by Draper Shreeve

=== 1986 ===
- December 12, 1986 - 124 Ridge Street Gallery, New York City
- Surprise Part A, Directed by Draper Shreeve
- Armed Forces, Directed by Tony Carpentiere
- Stiff, Directed by Larry Fessenden
- White Trash, Directed by Larry Fessenden
- New Work, Directed by Nik Mills
- Laurie Olinder Painting No. 1, Directed by Matthew Harrison
- September 27, 1986 - 124 Ridge Street Gallery, New York City
- Concrete, Directed by Russell Johnson
- Take Off Those Silly Sunglasses, Directed by Russell Johnson
- Self Portrait, Directed by Anna Hurwitz
- Stiff, Directed by Larry Fessenden
- White Trash, Directed by Larry Fessenden
- Big Box, Directed by Matthew Harrison
- How The Museum Of Natural History Caught The Brontosaurus, Directed by Matthew Harrison
- Vintage Cooper Union Indescretions, Directed by Nik Mills
- July 10, 1986 - 124 Ridge Street Gallery, New York City
- Roof Slip, Directed by Max Becher
- Steve And Sheba, Directed by Max Becher
- Chicken, Directed by Emily Breer
- Stork, Directed by Emily Breer
- Selected Films, Directed by Paul Gehres
- Caring For Your Cat, Directed by Matthew Harrison
- Sunken Forest, Directed by Peter Harrison
- Beaver, Directed by Anna Hurwitz
- Concrete, Directed by Russell Johnson
- Take Off Those Silly Sunglasses, Directed by Russell Johnson
- Surfer Joe, Directed by Christopher Grimm
- June 14, 1986 - 124 Ridge Street Gallery, New York City
- Program lost
- April 12, 1986 - 124 Ridge Street Gallery, New York City
- Film by Emily Breer
- Film by Art Sanzari
- Film by Anthony Chase
- Film by Matthew Harrison
- The Rivington School vs The Gas Station Film by Linus Coraggio
- Film by John Bauman
- May 17, 1986 - 124 Ridge Street Gallery, New York City
- Program lost
- March 15, 1986 - 124 Ridge Street Gallery, New York City
- Dance Noise, Directed by Jo Andress
- Dead Is Dada, Directed by Tim Milk
- Garbanzo Beans, Directed by John Bauman
- West Side Evan, Directed by Matthew Harrison
- Doris & Inez Speak The Truth, Directed by Jim Murray and David Shaw
- Untitled, Directed by Jim Romaine
- Untitled, Directed by Art Sanzari

=== 1985 ===
- December 6, 1985 - 124 Ridge Street Gallery, New York City
- Program lost
- June 21, 1985 - Club Neither Nor, New York City
- Mister Brain, Directed by Matthew Harrison
- A Tourist Day In New York, Directed by Matthew Harrison
- February 6, 1985 - 130 East 7 Street, New York City
- Mister Brain, Directed by Matthew Harrison
