= Jane Fine =

American visual artist

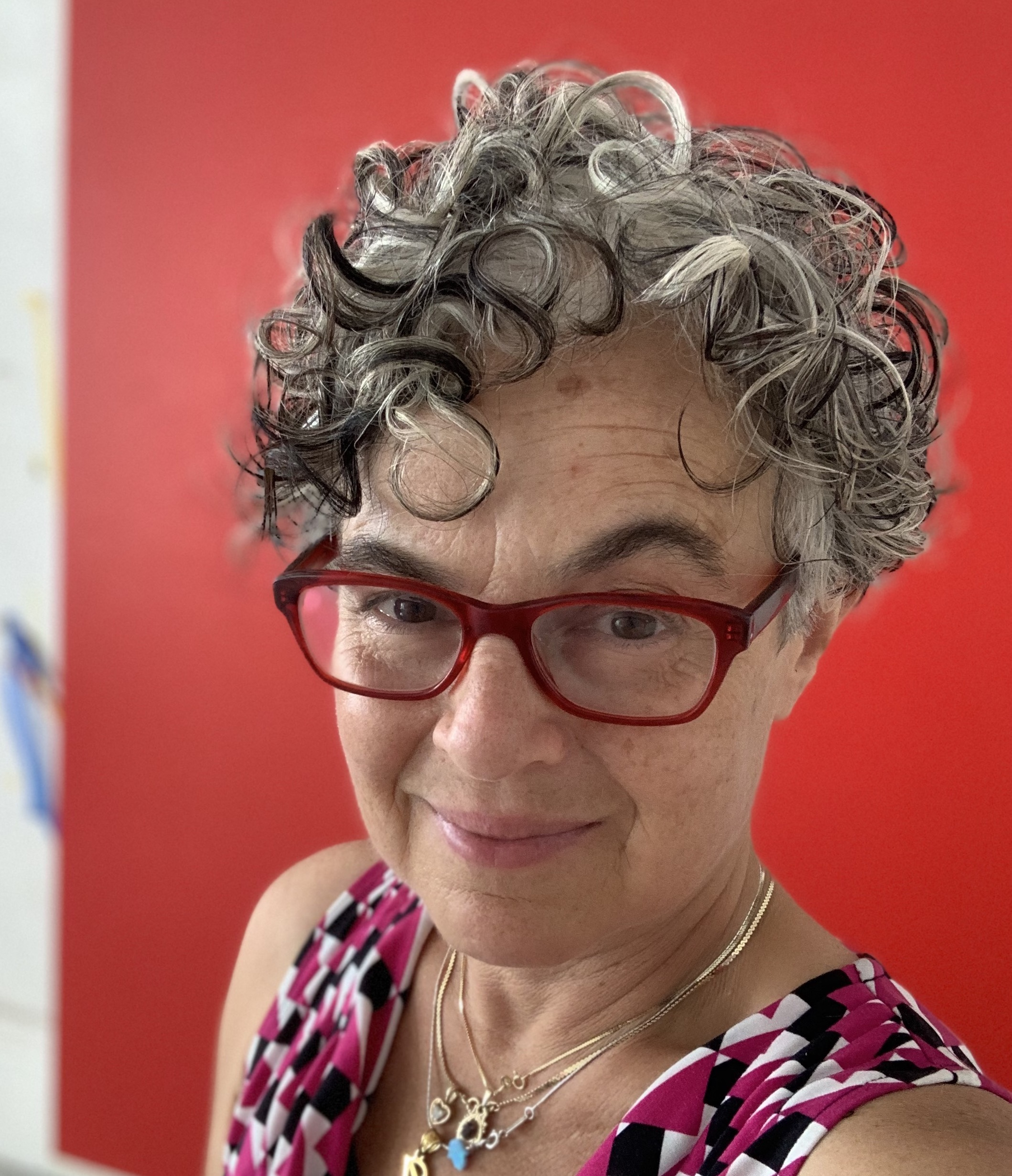
- Born: 1958 (age 67–68); New York City, US
- Education: Harvard University, Tufts University, Skowhegan School of Painting and Sculpture
- Known for: painting, abstraction
- Movement: feminism, neo-pop
- Spouse: James Esber

Jane Fine (born 1958) is an American visual artist. She has been an active participant in Williamsburg, Brooklyn's art scene since the 1980s. Her work has been associated with cartoons, graffiti, and the work of Philip Guston, who she met at Harvard University. She has collaborated on drawings with her husband, the painter James Esber, under the pseudonym "J. Fiber".

== Early life and education ==
Jane Fine grew up in New York City. She attended Hunter College High School and enrolled at Harvard University as a mathematics major, but then switched majors to focus on studio art. After graduating with a B.A. magna cum laude in Visual and Environmental Studies, she studied painting for two years at the School of the Museum of Fine Arts in Boston and went on to receive her M.A. from Tufts University. In 1989, she attended the Skowhegan School of Painting and Sculpture.

== Career ==
In 1985, Fine became one of the founding members of 124 Ridge Street Gallery on the Lower East Side, and participated in the gallery until 1988. In 1986, Fine moved to Williamsburg and became an active participant in the neighborhood's growing artist community, for which she was consulted in Ann Fensterstock's book Art on the Block: Tracking the New York Art World from SoHo to the Bowery, Bushwick and Beyond.

Her 1995 solo show at Casey Kaplan was the gallery's inaugural exhibition. Fine showed her work in some of the first commercial exhibition spaces in Williamsburg, including Annie Herron’s Test-Site and Pierogi (originally named Pierogi 2000). She was represented by Pierogi for over 20 years, where she had seven solo exhibitions. Other one-person exhibitions by Fine have been held at locations including White Columns, Colgate University, and the Mitchell Gallery at the Ringling College of Art and Design.

In 2018, after a 23andMe test, Fine discovered that the man she thought was her biological father was not. She was able to determine the identity of her biological father, a pediatrician she knew as a child named Henry Eisenoff. This patrilineal discovery had a profound impact on the direction of her work, which began to incorporate text as a means to explore the complex range of memories, perceptions, and emotions associated with the event.

== Teaching ==
Fine has held academic teaching positions at several institutions including Alfred University, Hamilton College, the University of California, Davis, the Rhode Island School of Design, and Vassar College. Notably, in 2009, she was the Christian A. Johnson Visiting Artist-in-Residence at Middlebury College.

== Awards and fellowships ==
- New York Foundation for the Arts and New York State Council on the Arts, Artist Fellow in Painting (2024)
- Pollock-Krasner Foundation Grant (2013, 2001)
- The New York Foundation for the Arts, Fellowship in Painting (2008)
- The New York Foundation for the Arts, Visual Artists Fellowship (1994)
- Fine Arts Work Center Fellowship, Provincetown, Massachusetts (1992, 1993)
- National Endowment for the Arts, Visual Artists Fellowship (1989)

== Residencies ==
- Yaddo, Saratoga Springs, New York (2021, 2011, 2001, 1998, 1996)
- MacDowell Fellowship, Peterborough, New Hampshire (2019)
- Stephen Pace Artist Residency, Fine Arts Work Center Provincetown, Provincetown, Massachusetts (2018)
- Hermitage Artist Retreat Fellowship, Englewood, Florida (2015, 2016)
- Golden Foundation Residency, New Berlin, New York (2013)
- Central City Artist Project, Artist-in-Residence, New Orleans (2010)
- Cité Internationale des arts, Residency, Paris, France (1998)
- Millay Colony for the Arts, Austerlitz, New York (1990)

== Selected solo and two-person exhibitions ==
- Three Sided Coin, Catskill Art Space (2024)
- Love, American Style, Pierogi, New York (2018)
- Contents Under Pressure, Pierogi, Brooklyn, New York (2015)
- Ladies and Gentlemen, Please Remain Calm, Clifford Gallery, Colgate University, Hamilton, New York (2014)
- Formulas For Now, Pierogi, Brooklyn, New York (2012)
- Jolly Quagmire, Michael Rosenthal Gallery, San Francisco, California (2010)
- Where Boys with Guns Wear Bows in Their Hair, Prospect 1.5, The Wesley, New Orleans, Louisiana (2010)
- Glad All Over, Pierogi, Brooklyn, New York (2009)
- J. Fiber: World War Me, Pierogi, Brooklyn, New York (2008)
- Skirmish, Pierogi, Leipzig, Germany (2007)
- Shock and Awe, Barbara Davis Gallery, Houston, Texas (2007)
- Friendly Fire, Bernard Toale Gallery, Boston, Massachusetts (2006)
- After Sugar Time, Pierogi, Brooklyn, New York (2004)
- Jane Fine: New Work, Pierogi, Brooklyn, New York (2000)
- Jane Fine, Casey Kaplan, New York (1996)
- Jane Fine, Casey Kaplan, New York (1995)
- White Room: Jane Fine, White Columns, New York (1992)

== Collections ==
- Neuberger Museum of Art, Purchase College, State University of New York, Purchase, New York
- Tang Teaching Museum, Skidmore College, Saratoga Springs, New York
- Harvard Art Museums, Harvard University, Cambridge, Massachusetts
- Hyde Collection, Glens Falls, New York
- University Museum of Contemporary Art, University of Massachusetts Amherst, Amherst
- Williams College Museum of Art, Williams, Massachusetts
- University Art Museum at University at Albany, State University of New York, Albany
- Rhode Island School of Design Museum, Providence, Rhode Island
- Louisiana State University Museum of Art, Baton Rouge, Louisiana
- Art Museum of the University of Memphis, Memphis, Tennessee
- Hunter Museum of American Art, Chattanooga, Tennessee
- West Collection
- Artist Pension Trust

== Bibliography ==
- Jerry Saltz, "25 Things to See, Hear, Watch, and Read Over the Next Two Weeks", New York Magazine, September 16, 2018
- Margaret McCann, "Patrlineations: Jane Fine at Pierogi", Painters' Table, October 3, 2018
- Ann Wood, "Jane Fine Pours Herself Into Her Work", Provincetown Banner, March 15, 2018, p. 27
- D. Eric Bookhardt, "Review: Works by Chris Guarisco, James Esber and Jane Fine", Best of New Orleans, March 19, 2013
- Will Corwin, "Jane Fine", Art Papers, 34, no. 1 (January/February 2010), p. 64
- Stephen Maine, "Jane Fine/Pierogi", Art in America, 97, no. 11 (December 2009), p. 140
- Jim Supanick, "Makin’ Whopee: A Conversation with J. Fiber, James Esber and Jane Fine with Jim Supanick", The Brooklyn Rail, April 2008, pp. 29–33
- Benjamin Genocchio, "What Is War Good For?", New York Times, January 9, 2005
- Gregory Volk, "Big Brash Borough", Art in America, no. 8 (September 2004), pp. 93–97, 142
- Ken Johnson, "Art in Review", New York Times, April 2, 2004
- Stephen Maine, "Dateline Brooklyn", artnet.com, April 2004
- "My Mother’s An Artist", New Yorker, May 26, 2003
- Holland Cotter, "Art Guide", New York Times, March 1, 2002
- Holland Cotter, "For Hikers Seeking Art, Brooklyn is a Left Bank", The New York Times, December 15, 2000
- "Galleries: Jane Fine", New Yorker, November 27, 2000
- Cathy Curtis, '"A Bridge to Brooklyn", Los Angeles Times, November 18, 1997
- Roberta Smith, "Art in Review", New York Times, April 14, 1995
- Stuart Servetar, "Jane Fine", New York Press, April 12, 1995
- Roberta Smith, "Shades of a Rebirth for Painting", New York Times, June 18, 1993
