= The Deep and Dreamless Sleep =

- Directed by: Matthew Harrison
- Written by: Matthew Harrison
- Produced by: Daniel Blumberg; Matthew Harrison
- Starring: Tami Reynolds; Kris Park; Ivan Martin; John Ortiz
- Cinematography: Howard Krupa; Matthew Harrison
- Edited by: Johannes Weuthen
- Music by: LUXURIOUS; Lee Curreri; Peter Freeman; Jeff Rona
- Release date: 2006
- Running time: 81 minutes
- Country: United States
- Language: English

The Deep and Dreamless Sleep is a 2006 American independent feature film adaptation of Dante Alighieri's 14th century poem Divine Comedy, set on the streets of downtown Manhattan, written and directed by Matthew Harrison. A reviewer for Variety described the film as presenting “kinetic visuals, naturalistic perfs and a frequently compelling take on a 700-year-old poem.”

Matthew Harrison's fourth feature film, originated on 16mm, S8mm and DV, premiered worldwide at the Avignon Film Festival and also screened at the 2006 Oldenburg International Film Festival.

The movie features animated segments, dramatizing back-story, photographed by artist Gina Garan using her collection of Blythe dolls. The Deep and Dreamless Sleep is Garan's first movie. The Deep and Dreamless Sleep also features a score by the collaborative team Luxurious, comprising Lee Curreri, Peter Freeman and Jeff Rona.

== Plot ==
This film is the story of Emma, who travels to New York City in search of her runaway lover. Guided by street hustler Brady who claims to know her errant boyfriend's whereabouts, the two set off on a journey through downtown New York City's night world. When Emma locates her lost paramour Neville, the true story of their split reveals Emma is not the innocent she claims.

== Cast ==
- Tami Reynolds as Emma
- Kris Park as Brady
- Ivan Martin as Neville
- John Ortiz as Mervin
- Katharine Hyde as Gwen
- Neil Jain as Neil
- Ed Vassallo as Everitt
- Daniel Harnett as Daniel

== Festivals and critical reception ==
The Deep and Dreamless Sleep premiered worldwide at the 2006 Avignon Film Festival and also had its German premiere at the 2006 Oldenburg International Film Festival.

A reviewer for Oldenburg's Mox magazine wrote “Rapid editing and glamorous images take the film to whole new levels. This film imparts the spirit of an instant classic, which takes on a piece of world literature.”

The catalog description of The Deep and Dreamless Sleep at the Oldenburg International Film Festival stated “There is much to be discovered in Harrison’s strange world, where actors recite their archaic dialogue in verse-like manner. The digital camera-work plays tricks with the light, the editing slows the action down or speeds it up, sometimes skipping whole parts. This is a radical experiment with a unique charm and poetry to it. From the ferries of the Styx (in this case the Hudson) through Hell’s Kitchen and back to the Upper West Side, this film shows us a New York of a different kind.”
