= Apartment Eight =

1987 film

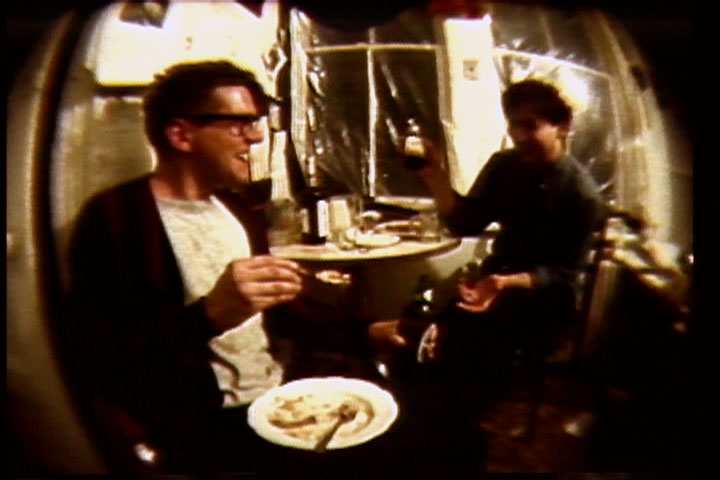
- Super 8mm frame from Apartment Eight
- Directed by: Matthew Harrison
- Starring: Michael Kaniecki; Robert McGrath
- Cinematography: Matthew Harrison
- Edited by: Matthew Harrison
- Music by: Michael Kaniecki & the RSO
- Distributed by: Film Crash
- Release date: July 10, 1987
- Running time: 34 minutes
- Country: United States
- Language: English

Apartment Eight is a 1987 Lower East Side comedy short film by director Matthew Harrison, which won Best Comedy at the 1988 New York Film Festival Downtown and the Mystic Fire Independent Film Award at the 1989 Ann Arbor Film Festival.

Rave-Ups singer Michael Kaniecki (who also wrote the score) and theater director Bob McGrath play former roommates Todd and Martin who, in the early 1980s, briefly led overlapping lives in Apartment Eight. Shot on S8mm film in monthly installments over a one-year period, most of the scenes in Apartment Eight were done as single takes in a cramped Clinton street tenement kitchen, as Todd and Martin re-enact some of the episodes of their downwardly mobile, girlfriend-sharing past. The title theme for the film, credited to Michael Kaniecki & the RSO, was performed by Su Bachemin, George Carter, Michael Kaniecki, and Brian Kaup.

== Cast ==
- Michael Kaniecki as Martin
- Bob McGrath as Todd

== Festivals and showcases ==
Apartment Eight was first screened publicly on July 10, 1987, in the East Village at the RAPP arts center by Film Crash. The film was further programmed at Kino Eiszeit Berlin, Space 2B Gas Station, Old and New Masters of Super 8 at the Anthology Film Archives and at the ICA in London.

In early 2005, New York's New Museum of Contemporary Art included Apartment Eight in their exhibit East Village USA. Curatorial Fellow Emily Rothschild wrote "(Apartment Eight's) inclusion is absolutely crucial to a thorough understanding of the East Village scene." and Flavorpill called the film "derelict".
