= Kicked in the Head (film) =

- Theatrical release poster
- Directed by: Matthew Harrison
- Written by: Kevin Corrigan; Matthew Harrison
- Produced by: Barbara De Fina
- Starring: Kevin Corrigan; Linda Fiorentino; Michael Rapaport; Lili Taylor; James Woods; Burt Young; Bianca Hunter
- Cinematography: Howard Krupa; John Thomas
- Edited by: Michael Berenbaum
- Music by: Stephen Endelman
- Production company: De Fina–Cappa
- Distributed by: October Films
- Release date: September 26, 1997
- Running time: 87 minutes
- Country: United States
- Language: English
- Budget: $4 million
- Box office: $102,739

Kicked in the Head is a 1997 American comedy film directed by Matthew Harrison, who co-wrote the screenplay with Kevin Corrigan. The film stars Corrigan, Linda Fiorentino, Michael Rapaport, Lili Taylor, James Woods and Burt Young. It was released on September 26, 1997, by October Films. The movie was co-executive produced by Martin Scorsese.

== Plot ==
Redmond is a young guy who can't seem to find what exactly he wants to do with his life. When his uncle, Sam, gives him the bag to deliver to some uptown connection, he fails to do so, and it gets them in trouble with Jack, a low-key criminal. After that, tough guy Stretch wants Redmond to take part in his illegal beer business, but before Redmond gets involved, the business ends in a bad way. Redmond is also found having an affair with flight attendant Megan.

== Cast ==
- Kevin Corrigan as Redmond
- Linda Fiorentino as Megan
- Michael Rapaport as "Stretch"
- Lili Taylor as "Happy"
- James Woods as Uncle Sam
- Burt Young as Jack
- Bianca Hunter as Pearl
- George T. Odom as Doorperson
- Olek Krupa as Borko
