= Travis Rush =

American singer-songwriter

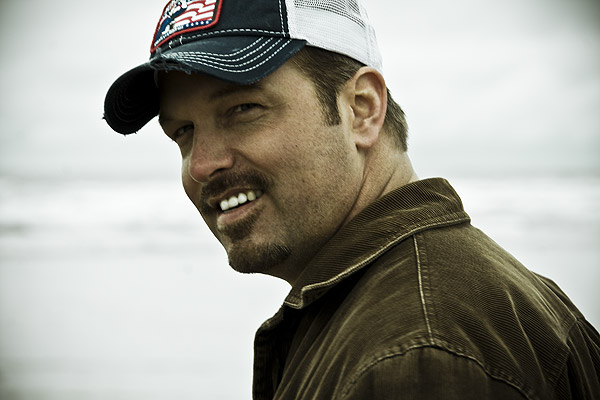

Background information
- Born: Travis Benjamin Rush
- Genres: Country
- Occupation: Singer / Songwriter / Producer
- Instrument: Piano
- Years active: 1987 - present
- Labels: Mason Records
- Website: http://www.travisrush.com

Travis Benjamin Rush is a country music singer from Oregon.

== Discography ==
=== Albums ===
- Come And Get It (2007)
- Feel (2010)

=== Singles ===
Year	Single	Album	US	US Country	US AC	US Pop	US Dig	ECMA
2007	"Come And Get It"	Come And Get It (2007)	-	-	-	-	-	-
2007	"Just For Tonight (Radio Edit)"	(Single Only) (2007)	-	-	-	-	-	No. 3
2010	"Feel"	Feel (2010)	-	-	-	-	-	-

=== Music videos ===
Year	Video	Director
2008	"Just For Tonight"	Matthew Harrison (director)
2010	"You'll Find Your Way"	Dustin Rush
