= Lisa Dennison =

Lisa Dennison is the chairman of Sotheby's North and South America. She was previously the director of the Solomon R. Guggenheim Museum in New York City. She became director in 2005 and resigned in 2007 to work at the auction house Sotheby's, where she is now Chairperson.

== Early life and education ==
Dennison grew up in New Jersey and attended Wellesley College, earning a Bachelor of Arts degree in Art History and French in 1975. She also attended Brown University, receiving a Master of Arts degree in Art History there in 1978.

== Career ==
Dennison first worked at the Guggenheim as a summer intern of Wellesley College in 1973; in 1978 she began working there independently. She worked as an exhibition coordinator, assistant curator, and deputy director and chief curator. In 2003 she was a candidate for the position of director of the Whitney Museum, but the position went to Adam D. Weinberg.

In October 2005, Dennison became the director of the Guggenheim Museum and replaced seventeen-year director Thomas Krens, as the director of the Solomon R. Guggenheim Foundation. She was also approached by the Los Angeles County Museum of Art and the Cleveland Museum of Art to serve as a director there.

As director of the Guggenheim, Dennison organized 35 shows, one of which was a traveling exhibition of 125 works in the Guggenheim’s collection.
