= Lee Curreri =

American actor and musician

- Born: Leonard Charles Curreri; January 4, 1961 (age 65); New York City, U.S.
- Education: Fordham Preparatory School; Manhattan School of Music
- Occupations: Actor, musician
- Known for: Bruno Martelli in Fame
- Website: leecurreri.com

Leonard Charles Curreri (born January 4, 1961) is an American actor and musician, most known for his work in the film Fame (1980) and , its television spinoff (1982–1987).

== Life and work ==
Curreri was born in the Bronx, New York City, and attended high school at Fordham Preparatory School. He attended the Manhattan School of Music.

Curreri played the role of Bruno Martelli, the keyboard virtuoso, in the film Fame and also in its spinoff TV series, also called Fame. He obtained the role in the movie after auditioning in New York City. He appeared on an episode of The New Love American Style.

He played piano with In Vitro, and the Iona College Singers. He is a songwriter and has worked with performers such as Natalie Cole and Phil Perry.

== Partial filmography ==
- Fame (1980) - Bruno Martelli
- Crystal Heart (1986) - Christopher Newley

=== Soundtracks ===
- The Deep and Dreamless Sleep (2006) – with Peter Freeman and Jeff Rona

== See also ==
- The Kids from "Fame"
