= Paul Villinski =

American sculptor (born 1960)

Paul Villinski (born 1960) is an American sculptor best known for his large-scale installations of individual butterflies made from aluminum cans found on the streets on New York City. “A pilot of sailplanes, paragliders and single-engine airplanes, metaphors of flight and soaring often appear in his work. With a lifelong concern for environmental issues, his work frequently re-purposes discarded materials.” He is represented in New York by Morgan Lehman Gallery.

== Biography ==
Paul Villinski has created large-scale artworks since the mid-eighties. Villinski was born in York, Maine, in 1960, son of an Air Force navigator. He has lived and worked in New York City since 1982. He briefly attended Phillips Exeter Academy and the Massachusetts College of Art, and graduated with a BFA with honors from the Cooper Union for the Advancement of Science and Art in 1984. He lives and works in Long Island City, New York, alongside his partner, painter Amy Park, and their son Lark.

== Works ==
Comforter (1994) at the Renwick Gallery in Washington, DC in 2022

Villinski is best known for his sculptural wall works. In the early nineties he began collecting discarded beer cans and cutting them into butterfly shapes. His wall works utilize hundreds of individually cut butterflies mounted into different organic compositions. He has also developed works to include other motifs of flight including bird sculptures, first made from abandoned record albums found after Hurricane Katrina. Later he transformed his entire record collection into artworks. Much of Villinski's work, including his butterfly sculptures and Comforter (1994), grapple with the artist's struggle with addiction and substance abuse.

=== Emergency Response Studio ===
Villinski created a mobile artist studio by salvaging a Federal Emergency Management Agency-style trailer and transforming it into a mobile, sustainable live/work space. His intent was that the trailer be used to house displaced artists or enable artists to be dispatched into post-disaster contexts. The work was created after a visit to post-Katrina New Orleans. The project was first exhibited at Prospect.1 New Orleans, the largest international biennial of contemporary art ever organized in the U.S. up until that point in 2008. The trailer was later a subject of a solo exhibition at Rice University Art Gallery, Houston, Texas and travelled to Ballroom Marfa, in Marfa, Texas; Wesleyan University's Zilkha Gallery; and Middletown, Connecticut, and participated in the New Museum's "Festival of Ideas for the New City", in New York City.

== Exhibitions ==
His work has been included in numerous exhibitions nationally, including:

- "Paul Villinski: Flight Patterns", 2024, Frederik Meijer Gardens & Sculpture Park, Grand Rapids, Michigan
- “Lift”, 2015, Austin Art Projects, Palm Desert CA
- “Paul Villinski: Burst”, 2014-2015, McNay Art Museum in San Antonio, TX
- “Paradigm”, 2014, Morgan Lehman Gallery, New York City
- “Re: Collection”, 2014, Museum of Arts and Design, New York, NY
- “Material Transformations”, 2014, Montgomery Museum of Art, Montgomery, AL
- “Making Mends,” 2012, Bellevue Museum of Arts, Bellevue, WA
- “Passage: A Special Installation,” 2011–Present, Blanton Museum, University of Texas, Austin
- Festival of Ideas for the New City, exhibition of “Emergency Response Studio” organized by The New Museum, 2011, New York, NY
- Never Can Say Goodbye, former Tower Records store, 2010, New York, NY (curated by No Longer Empty)
- “Emergency Response Studio”, 2009, Rice University Gallery, Houston, TX.
- Prospect .1, biennale “Emergency Response Studio”, 2009, New Orleans, LA
- Pricked: Extreme Embroidery, 2008, The Museum of Arts and Design, New York, NY

== Public works ==
The New York Percent for Art program has commissioned "SkyCycles," three full-scale "flying bicycles" to be installed at Ocean Breeze, a new parks and recreation track and field facility located on Staten Island. The City of New Haven Percent for Art Program commissioned “Dreamdesk,” a flying school desk with 18’ wingspan which was installed at the entrance to the East Rock Magnet School in 2014.

== Collections ==
Villinski is collected by many public, private, and corporate institutions and individuals, including:

- Museum of Arts and Design, NY
- New Orleans Museum of Art, LA,
- Miami International Airport, Miami, FL
- The Museum of Contemporary Art, Jacksonville, FL
- The University of Michigan Mott Children’s and Von Voigtlander Women’s Hospital, Ann Arbor, MI

Corporate collections include Fidelity Investments, Microsoft, Progressive Insurance, the Cleveland Clinic, ADP, McCann Erickson International, New York Life, and Ritz-Carlton.

== Recognitions, awards, and residencies ==
- Artist-in-Residence, Serenbe Institute, Chattahoochee Hills, GA, 2012, 2009
- Artist-in-Residence, Socrates Sculpture Park, Long Island City, NY, 2008
- Artist-in-Residence, Ucross Foundation, Ucross, WY, 1992
- Artist-in-Residence, Montalvo Arts Center, Saratoga, CA, 1991
- Agnes Bourne Fellowship in Painting, Djerassi Foundation Resident Artists Program, Woodside, CA, 1988
- National Endowment for the Arts Fellowship Grant, 1987
- Artist-in-Residence, Millay Colony for the Arts, Austerlitz, NY, 1987
- Michael S. Vivo Prize for Excellence in Drawing, The Cooper Union, New York, NY, 1984
- David Berger Award for Excellence, Massachusetts College of Art, Boston, MA, 1982
