= Box Head Revolution =

- Directed by: Mark L Christensen
- Written by: Mark L Christensen; Brian Hemill
- Produced by: Mark L Christensen
- Starring: Adam Cooper; Jenny Kim; James Barry; Ben Daka; Mark Christensen
- Cinematography: Mark L Christensen
- Edited by: Mark L Christensen
- Music by: Ant Man Bee
- Color process: black and white
- Distributed by: Find Art Films
- Release date: August 17, 2002
- Running time: 76 minutes
- Country: United States
- Language: English
- Budget: 7,000

Box Head Revolution is a 2002 black and white science fiction film, directed, produced, edited and co-written by Mark L Christensen.

== Plot ==
On an unknown planet in an uncertain time, a two-tiered society has taken shape. The ruling class live above ground and wear masks on their faces, while the working class labors below the surface of the planet. The lowest order of the underground culture – prisoners, revolutionaries and various troublemakers – are forced to wear boxes locked around their heads. One day, an alien craft crashes on the planet. Gritt (Adom Cooper) and Brythle (Jenny Kim), a pair of rebellious young lovers from the upper tier of the planet's society, discover the wreckage. Unknown to them, the wreckage is a Voyager program space craft that was launched from the United States. in the 1970s. Within the wreckage is a long-playing gold album featuring rock music of the 1970s. Despite the efforts of the ruling class to destroy this album, the young lovers are able to broadcast the music to the planet's oppressed masses. With this musical discovery, the planet faces a sudden and unstoppable turn of events that brings about the eponymous uprising.

== Production and reception ==
Box Head Revolution was the filmmaking debut of Mark Christensen, who was a dancer, a pilot, a two time world champion skateboarder, One of the first innovators of the Snow Board, and a musician before turning to cinema production. In the film’s press notes, he stated he turned to filmmaking because he felt "it would be easier to communicate his ideas through film rather than struggling with a song. "

Box Head Revolution was shot on a very low budget in black-and-white 16 millimeter film, and the cinematography was intentionally out of focus. Dave Kehr, reviewing the film for The New York Times noted, “Mr. Christensen's use of very blurry black-and-white video serves a double purpose. It disguises the complete absence of sets while lending the film the quality of decaying contraband from the indefinite past.”

Box Head Revolution had its theatrical premiere in New York City on August 21, 2002, and reviews were mixed. Edward Havens, writing for the online magazine FilmJerk.com, stated the film "is the most audacious directorial debut to invade American cinemas in a very long time. It's not the best film debut, nor the best looking or most intelligent. And the funny thing is, after watching the film, I don't think Mr. Christensen cares if you like it or not." David Sterritt, reviewing the film for The Christian Science Monitor, commented that the film's "story is almost incoherent, but there's a weirded-out charm to Christensen's visual style – part German Expressionism, part 'Captain Video,' part early David Lynch – all as hazy as a half-remembered dream." But Ken Fox, writing for TV Guide Online, noted: "The onscreen text is riddled with typos, the migraine-inducing B&W photography is often over-exposed and out of focus, the post-synchronized sound is badly looped and Christensen himself can be heard directing his actors. Adventurous — and forgiving — lovers of strange celluloid could do worse. Others will no doubt find the whole experience the longest 76 minutes of their lives." And Shaun Sages, writing for the Movie Navigator online site, found the film to be "weirder than anything you’ll stumble upon watching 4 a.m. Sci Fi Channel programming."

To date, Box Head Revolution has not been commercially released on DVD.
