= University Art Museum (University at Albany) =

- Location: 1400 Washington Avenue, Albany, New York
- Coordinates: 42.686271°N 73.822899°W
- Type: Contemporary art museum
- Owner: University at Albany
- Website: albany.edu/museum

The University Art Museum is the art museum of the State University of New York at Albany.

Founded in 1967, the 9,000-square-foot-facility was designed by architect Edward Durell Stone. The Museum has presented over four hundred exhibitions and its collection is especially strong in contemporary works on paper.

The University at Albany Art Museum Collections comprise over 3,000 objects and reflect 50 years of modern and contemporary art, including paintings, photographs, prints, drawings and sculpture, by many of the most prominent artists of the 20th and 21st centuries. The Museum’s Collections Study Space is a multi-purpose space designed to safely house the University at Albany Fine Art Collections and simultaneously make them accessible to students, faculty, other researchers and scholars, and the community. The Museum's collections include works by Vito Acconci, Xu Bing, Mel Bochner, Manuel Alvarez Bravo, Willem de Kooning, Richard Diebenkorn, Leon Golub, Donald Judd, Grace Hartigan, Ellsworth Kelly, Yasumasa Morimura, Vik Muniz, Louise Nevelson, Eduardo Paolozzi, Robert Rauschenberg, Tim Rollins and K.O.S., James Rosenquist, Dieter Roth, Edward Ruscha, Lorna Simpson, Robert Smithson and Kara Walker.
