= Treasures from American Film Archives =

Six DVD sets by the National Film Preservation Foundation (2000–2013)

The Treasures from American Film Archives series of DVDs is produced by the National Film Preservation Foundation (NFPF), a nonprofit organization created by the U.S. Congress in 1997. The NFPF publishes these DVD sets, with accompanying booklets and extensive commentary, to promote public access to the films preserved by the American archival community.

The NFPF's inaugural DVD set — Treasures from American Film Archives, issued in 2000 — was the first video anthology sampling the range of films preserved by American cultural institutions. Featuring home movies, avant-garde films, documentaries, government films, cartoons, newsreels, political ads, and silent-era narratives saved by 18 archives from Alaska to West Virginia, the set presented 50 historically significant works that had never been available before on video. By providing these examples on video, the set helped popularize the idea of the orphan film. When the first edition went out of print in 2005, it was reissued as the Encore edition.

Since 2000, the NFPF has issued five other box sets, each with a specific theme. More Treasures from American Archives, 1894–1931 showcases the creative range of American motion pictures in their first four decades through examples preserved by the nation's leading silent-film archives. It was the first NFPF set to feature audio commentary. Treasures III: Social Issues in American Film, 1900–1934 looks at socially inflected films during the formative years cinema, when virtually no issue was too controversial for the big screen. Treasures IV: American Avant-Garde Film, 1947–1986 is the first multi-artist survey of the avant-garde film movement in the years following World War II. Treasures 5: The West, 1898–1938 explores how the West was imagined and documented in early cinema. Lost and Found: American Treasures From the New Zealand Film Archive presents a sampling of repatriated American films previously existing only in foreign archives.

To date, six sets of DVDs present 227 films on 17 discs for a total runtime of 3,059 minutes (51 hours). All NFPF-produced sets are region-free and playable around the world. These sets are:

- Treasures from American Film Archives: 50 Preserved Films (2000), 50 films on 4 discs.
- More Treasures from American Film Archives, 1894–1931 (2004), 50 films on 3 discs.
- Treasures III: Social Issues in American Film, 1900–1934 (2007), 48 films on 4 discs.
- Treasures IV: American Avant-Garde Film, 1947–1986 (2008), 26 films on 2 discs.
- Treasures 5: The West, 1898–1938 (2011), 40 films on 3 discs.
- Lost and Found: American Treasures From the New Zealand Film Archive (2013), 13 films on 1 disc.

Another box set was announced in 2011, intended for release in 2014: Treasures 6: Next Wave Avant-Garde, with the following titles: Report by Bruce Conner, Radio Adios by Henry Hills, Hi-Fi Cadets by Lewis Klahr, A Visit to Indiana by Curt McDowell and Ted Davis, Plumb Line by Carolee Schneemann, and 11 thru 12 by Andrea Callard. It has yet to be released.

== The DVD sets ==
=== Treasures from American Film Archives: 50 Preserved Films (2000, encore edition 2005) ===
- Number of discs: 4
- Number of films: 50
- Date range: 1893–1985
- Total runtime: 642 min. (10.7 hrs.)
- Narrator: Laurence Fishburne
- Booklet(s): 150-page book of program notes. Encore edition has 4 booklets accompanying the 4 DVDs.

Select reviews:

- Farnsworth, E (January 15, 2001). "Saving Orphan Films," NewsHour.
- Klein, J (May 27, 2005). "'Treasures' returns as sequel and encore," Chicago Tribune.

The films:
Disc 1

- The Original Movie (1922, 8 min.), moviemaking in the Stone Age, told in silhouette animation; directed by Tony Sarg.
- Early films from the Edison Company
  - Blacksmith Scene (1893, 1 min.), the first commercially shown U.S. film; directed by W. K. L. Dickson.
  - The Gay Shoe Clerk (1903, 1 min.), directed by Edwin S. Porter.
  - Three American Beauties (1906, 1 min.), directed by Edwin S. Porter and Wallace McCutcheon.
- Princess Nicotine; or, The Smoke Fairy (1909, 5 min.), special effects fantasy on the perils of smoking; directed by J. Stuart Blackton.
- The Confederate Ironclad (1912, 16 min.), Civil War adventure with original music score; directed by Kenean Buel.
- Hell's Hinges (1916, 64 min.), directed by William S. Hart (uncredited) and Charles Swickard, produced by Thomas H. Ince.
- The Fall of the House of Usher (1928, 13 min.), an avant-garde retelling of the Poe tale; directed by James Sibley Watson Jr.
- From Groucho Marx's home movies (ca. 1933, 2 min.).
- Running Around San Francisco for an Education (1938, 2 min.), election ad for a school bond issue.
- From Tevya (1939, 17 min.), excerpt from the Yiddish-language classic; directed by Maurice Schwartz.
- Cologne: From the Diary of Ray and Esther (1939, 14 min.), portrait of small-town America made by a local doctor and his wife.
- Private Snafu: "Spies" (1943, 4 min.), an irreverent cartoon made for servicemen; directed by Chuck Jones and written by Dr. Seuss.
- OffOn (1968, 9 min.), psychedelic landmark by Scott Bartlett.

Disc 2

- Paper Print Copyright Deposits
  - Demolishing and Building up the Star Theatre (1901, 1 min.), directed by F. S. Armitage.
  - Move On (1903, 1 min.), directed by Alfred C. Abadie.
  - Dog Factory (1904, 4 mins.), directed by Edwin S. Porter.
- The Lonedale Operator (1911, 17 min.), a race-to-the-rescue melodrama; directed by D. W. Griffith.
- Her Crowning Glory (1911, 14 min.), domestic comedy with John Bunny and Flora Finch; directed by Laurence Trimble.
- The Toll of the Sea (1922, 54 min.), an early 2-color Technicolor feature starring Anna May Wong; script by Frances Marion and directed by Chester M. Franklin.
- From Accuracy First (c. 1928, 5 min.), Western Union employee training film.
- From West Virginia documentaries
  - West Virginia, the State Beautiful (1929, 8 min.), amateur travelogue by Ottis Rymer Snodgrass.
  - One-Room Schoolhouses (c. 1935, 1 min.), footage of one-room Barbour County schoolhouses by Karl Myers and Elmer Myers.
- From Early Amateur Sound Film (1936–37, 4 min.), by home movie enthusiast Archie Stewart.
- Composition 1 (Themis) (1940, 4 min.), stop-motion animation by Dwinell Grant.
- The Battle of San Pietro (1945, 33 min.), stunning combat documentary; directed by John Huston.
- Negro Leagues Baseball (1946, 8 min.), footage of "Goose" Tatum and other greats.
- Battery Film (1985, 9 min.), experimental blend of documentary and animation by Richard Protovin and Franklin Backus.

Disc 3

- The Thieving Hand (1908, 5 min.), comic fable told through stop-motion animation and special effects; from Vitagraph Studios.
- White Fawn's Devotion (1910, 11 min.), a western directed by James Young Deer, the first Native American filmmaker in Hollywood.
- The Chechahcos (1924, 86 min.), Klondike gold rush adventure, the first feature filmed entirely on location in Alaska; directed by Lewis S. Moomaw.
- From Japanese American Communities (1927–32, 7 min.), home movies by a Buddhist priest.
- From Rare Aviation Films
  - The Keystone "Patrician" (1928, 6 min.), promotional film for a new plane.
  - The Zeppelin "Hindenburg" (1936, 7 min.), home movies on board the LZ 129 Hindenburg.
- We Work Again (1937, 15 min.), WPA documentary; includes 4 minutes of the only film of Orson Welles's legendary 1936 "Voodoo" Macbeth.
- From La Valse (1951, 6 min.); choreography by George Balanchine, directed by Carol Lynn.
- The Wall (1962, 10 min.), USIA documentary on the Berlin Wall; directed by Walter de Hoog.
- George Dumpson's Place (1965, 8 min.), Ed Emshwiller's portrait of a folk artist and his world of found objects.

Disc 4

- Peepshow Kinetoscopes
  - Luis Martinetti, Contortionist (1894, 1 min.), directed by W. K. L. Dickson.
  - Caicedo, King of the Slack Wire (1894, 1 min.), directed by W. K. L. Dickson.
- Interior New York Subway, 14th Street to 42nd Street (1905, 5 min.), trip on the new IRT filmed by G. W. Bitzer.
- The Land Beyond the Sunset (1912, 14 min.), slum kids dream of a better life; directed by Harold Shaw.
- I'm Insured (1916, 3 min.), cartoon by Harry Palmer.
- Snow White (1916, 63 min.), the earliest film version; starring Marguerite Clark and directed by J. Searle Dawley.
- From Beautiful Japan (1918, 15 min.), travel-lecture film by Benjamin Brodsky.
- From Rural Life in Maine (ca. 1930, 12 min.), home movies by Elizabeth Woodman Wright.
- The News Parade of 1934 (1934, 10 min.), Hearst Metrotone News recap of the year.
- Rose Hobart (1936, 19 min.), found footage; Joseph Cornell's obscure but entrancing surrealist collage classic.
- The Autobiography of a 'Jeep' (1943, 10 min.), celebration of the indestructible World War II vehicle; directed by Irving Lerner and narrated by Robert Sloan who assumes the role of the Jeep itself.
- From Marian Anderson: the Lincoln Memorial Concert (1939, 8 min.), newsreel reconstruction of this key event in Civil Rights history.

=== More Treasures from American Film Archives, 1894–1931 (2004) ===
- Number of discs: 3
- Number of films: 50
- Date range: 1894–1931
- Total runtime: 573 min. (9.5 hrs.)
- Booklet: 200-page illustrated book with film notes and credits

Four feature films (over an hour in length) are included in this set; also: 46 short advertisements, documentaries, promotional and educational films, and some early experiments with color and sound.

Select reviews:

- Schwartz, L (January 4, 2005). "More Treasures from American Film Archives," Fresh Air.

The films:

Disc 1

- The Dickson Experimental Sound Film (ca. 1894, 1 min.), two men dancing and a man playing a violin in front of a huge metal cone (the microphone for the wax cylinder the sound was recorded on); directed by W. K. L. Dickson.
- Buffalo Bill's Wild West
  - Annie Oakley (1894, 1 min.), directed by W. K. L. Dickson.
  - Buffalo Dance (1894, 1 min.), directed by W. K. L. Dickson.
  - Bucking Broncho (1894, 1 min.), directed by W. K. L. Dickson.
- The Suburbanite (1904, 9 min.), a polite comedy about the exploits of a middle-class family moving to the "burbs" of New Jersey; directed by Wallace McCutcheon.
- The Country Doctor (1909, 14 min.), a tale of a physician torn between his duty to family and profession; directed by D. W. Griffith with an early performance by Mary Pickford.
- The Wonderful Wizard of Oz (1910, 13 min.), earliest known film adaptation of L. Frank Baum's novel; directed by Otis Turner.
- Early Advertising Films
  - Admiral Cigarette (1897, 1 min.), directed by William Heise.
  - Flash Cleaner (ca. 1920, 1 min.)
  - Buy An Electric Refrigerator (1926, 1 min.), from Electric League of Pittsburgh.
  - The Stenographer's Friend (1910, 8 min.), from Edison Manufacturing Company.
- The Invaders (1912, 41 min.), Sioux and Cheyenne conflicts in this early epic western, featuring real Lakota Sioux; directed by Thomas H. Ince and Francis Ford.
- The Hazards of Helen: Episode 26, "The Wild Engine" (1915, 14 min.), an action-packed episode from the movie serial; directed by J. P. McGowan.
- Gretchen the Greenhorn (1916, 58 min.), Dutch migrants who fall victim to a gang of counterfeiters; featuring Dorothy Gish, Elmo Lincoln and Eugene Pallette, directed by Chester M. Franklin and Sidney A. Franklin.
- The Breath of a Nation (1919, 6 min.), Gregory La Cava cartoon on the first day of prohibition.
- De-Light: Making an Electric Light Bulb (1920, 12 min.), from the Ford Motor Company, distributed by Goldwyn Pictures Corporation.
- Skyscraper Symphony (1929, 9 min.), Robert Florey's avant-garde portrait of Manhattan.
- Greeting by George Bernard Shaw (1928, 5 min.), first talkie of the playwright.

Disc 2

- The Streets of New York
  - What Happened on Twenty-Third Street (1901, 1 min.), directed by Edwin S. Porter.
  - At the Foot of the Flatiron (1903, 2 min.), directed by A. E. Weed.
  - New York City "Ghetto" Fish Market (1903, 2 min.), directed by James Blair Smith.
- From Leadville to Aspen: A Hold-Up in the Rockies (1906, 8 min.), train hold-up film made for railroad-car theaters; photographed by G. W. Btizer.
- The Teddy Bears (1907, 13 min.), an Edison short with impressive puppet animation; directed by Wallace McCutcheon and Edwin S. Porter.
- Children Who Labor (1912, 13 min.), crusading melodrama co-produced by the National Child Labor Committee and the Edison company; directed by Ashley Miller.
- Early Color Films
  - From Concerning $1000 (1916, 1 min.)
  - From Exhibition Reel of Two Color Film (ca. 1929, 4 min.)
  - The Flute of Krishna (1926, 7 min.), choreographed by Martha Graham.
- Surviving reel of Lotus Blossom (1921, 12 min.), earliest known film from a Chinese American company; directed by Frank Grandon and James B. Leong.
- Gus Visser and His Singing Duck (ca. 1925, 2 min.), another synchronized sound experiment; possibly directed by Theodore Case.
- Clash of the Wolves (1925, 74 min.), a Rin Tin Tin silent; directed by Noel Mason Smith.
- International Newsreel, Volume 8, Issue 97 (1926, 13 min.)
- Now You're Talking (1927, 9 min.), instructional cartoon on how to use a telephone; directed by Dave Fleischer.
- There It Is (1928, 19 min.), animation by the Inkwell Studios; absurdist comedy two-reeler by Charley Bowers (the great unknown silent movie comedian, stop-action animation innovator and rather surreal filmmaker).
- A Bronx Morning (1931, 11 min.), avant-garde documentary by Jay Leyda.

Disc 3

- Rip Van Winkle (1896, 4 min.), a series of very short scenes adapted from a popular stage play starring Joseph Jefferson (an established stage actor since before the American Civil War); directed by W. K. L. Dickson and photographed by G. W. Bitzer to be shown on flip-card style mutoscope machines.
- Mr. Edison at Work in his Chemical Laboratory (1897, 1 min.), directed by James White.
- Life of an American Fireman (1903, 6 min.), directed by Edwin S. Porter.
- Three films from the Westinghouse Works series (1904, 6 min.), on location in America's largest factory; photographed by G. W. Bitzer.
- Falling Leaves (1912, 12 min.), directed by Alice Guy Blaché.
- Hollywood Promotional Films
  - Exhibitor's reel for Hands Up—A Cyclonic Western Serial (1918, 7 min.)
  - From C-V News [filming Greed in Death Valley] (1923, 4 min.)
  - Movie Lovers' Contest #4 (1926, 3 min.)
- De Forest Phonofilms
  - A Few Moments with Eddie Cantor (ca. 1923, 7 min.)
  - President Coolidge, Taken on the White House Grounds (1924, 4 min.), first talking political spot.
- Inklings, Issue 12 (1925, 6 min.), witty visual puns by Dave Fleischer.
- Lady Windermere's Fan (1925, 89 min.), film adaptation of Oscar Wilde's play; starring Ronald Colman and directed by Ernst Lubitsch.
- Cockeyed: Gems from the Memory of a Nutty Cameraman (ca. 1925, 3 min.), trick photographic views of Manhattan.
- Prologue from The Passaic Textile Strike (1926, 18 min.), docudrama by striking workers to tell their story.
- Tramp, Tramp, Tramp (The Boys are Marching) (1926, 4 min.), follow-the-bouncing-ball sing along with Ko-Ko the Clown; directed by Dave Fleischer.
- From Zora Neale Hurston's Fieldwork Footage (1928, 5 min.), scenes of the rural South filmed by the famed novelist, Zora Neale Hurston.
- Trailers for Lost Films
  - In the Days of Daniel Boone (1923, 2 min.)
  - The Silent Flyer (1926, 2 min.)
  - The American Venus (1926, 2 min.)
  - The Great Gatsby (1926, 1 min.)
  - Beau Sabreur (1928, 1 min.)
  - The Patriot (1928, 3 min.)

=== Treasures III: Social Issues in American Film, 1900–1934 (2007) ===
- Number of discs: 4
- Number of films: 48
- Date range: 1900–1934
- Total runtime: 738 min. (12.3 hrs.)
- Booklet: 200-page illustrated book with film notes and credits

Exposing abuse or lampooning reform, films in the early 20th century put a human face on social problems and connected with audiences in a new way. Topics include: prohibition, abortion, unions, atheism, the vote for women, organized crime, loan sharking, juvenile justice, homelessness, police corruption, immigration—in their first decades, movies brought an astonishing range of issues to the screen.

Select reviews:

- Corliss, R (October 16, 2007). "Treasures III: Social Issues in American Film, 1900–1934", TIME.
- Ellerson, L (October 16, 2007). "A Reality Check from a Century Past", ABC News.

The films:
Disc 1 – "The City Reformed"

- The Black Hand (1906, 11 min.), earliest surviving gangster film; probably directed by Wallace McCutcheon.
- How They Rob Men in Chicago (1900, 1 min.), an elderly man is robbed in Chicago, but some money is left behind on his unconscious person; directed by Wallace McCutcheon.
- The Voice of the Violin (1909, 16 min.), a terrorist plot foiled by the power of music; directed by D. W. Griffith and featuring Mack Sennett in a bit part.
- The Usurer's Grip (1912, 15 min.), melodrama arguing for consumer credit co-operatives; directed by Bannister Merwin.
- From the Submerged (1912, 11 min.), drama about homelessness and slumming parties; directed by Theodore Wharton.
- Hope—A Red Cross Seal Story (1912, 14 min.), a town mobilizes to fight tuberculosis; directed by Charles J. Brabin.
- The Cost of Carelessness (1913, 13 min.), traffic safety film for Brooklyn children; from Universal Film Manufacturing Company.
- Lights and Shadows in a City of a Million (1920, 7 min.), a charitable plea for the Detroit community fund; from the Ford Motor Company.
- 6,000,000 American Children . . . Are Not in School (1922, 2 min.), newsreel inspired by census data; produced by Lewis J. Selznick.
- The Soul of Youth (1920, 80 min.), a feature about an orphan reclaimed for society through the court of Judge Ben Lindsey; directed by William Desmond Taylor.
  - With excerpts from Saved by the Juvenile Court (1913, 4 min.) essentially a political advertisement for Judge Ben Lindsey; directed by Otis B. Thayer.
- A Call for Help from Sing Sing! (1934, 3 min.), Warden Lawes speaks out for wayward teens.

Disc 2 – "New Women"

- Kansas Saloon Smashers (1901, 1 min.), Carrie Nation swings her axe; directed by George S. Fleming and Edwin S. Porter.
- Why Mr. Nation Wants a Divorce (1901, 2 min.), role reversal temperance spoof; directed by George S. Fleming and Edwin S. Porter.
- Trial Marriages (1907, 12 min.), male fantasy inspired by a reformer's proposal, a man tries marriage to several women and finally gives up on matrimony entirely; photographed by G. W. Bitzer.
- Manhattan Trade School for Girls (1911, 16 min.), training impoverished girls for better jobs.
- The Strong Arm Squad of the Future (ca.1912, 1 min.), a suffragette cartoon; from Mutual Film Corporation.
- A Lively Affair (ca. 1912, 7 min.), comedy with women playing poker and child-caring men. The moral is that this is what to expect if women get the vote.
- A Suffragette in Spite of Himself (1912, 8 min.), boys' prank results in an unwitting crusader; directed by Bannister Merwin.
- On To Washington (1913, 1 min.), news coverage of the historic suffragette march.
- The Hazards of Helen, Episode 13: "The Escape on the Fast Freight" (1915, 13 min.), Helen thwarts some robbers and overcomes workplace problems; directed by Helen Holmes and Leo Maloney.
- Where Are My Children? (1916, 65 min.), film against abortion that brings in the issue of birth control as well, which is a bit confusing to modern audiences; starring Tyrone Power Sr. and directed by Lois Weber and Phillips Smalley.
- The Courage of the Commonplace (1913, 13 min.), a young farm woman dreams of a better life; directed by Rollin S. Sturgeon.
- Poor Mrs. Jones! (1926, 46 min.), a woman works endless hard hours on the farm and believes her sister who lives in the city has a much a better life, until she visits her for a week and realizes that the grass is not always greener on the other side; directed by Raymond Evans.
- Offers Herself as a Bride for $10,000 (1931, 2 min.), a woman comes up with a way to survive the depression.

Disc 3 – "Toil and Tyranny"

- Uncle Sam and the Bolshevik-I.W.W. Rat (1919, 1 min.), anti-union cartoon from Ford Motor Company.
- The Crime of Carelessness (1912, 14 min.), tells the story of a workplace fire without references to a specific company, but parallels with the Triangle Factory fire are heavily implied; directed by Harold M. Shaw.
- Who Pays, Episode 12: "Toil and Tyranny" (1915, 35 min.), lumberyard strike brings deadly consequences; directed by Harry Harvey.
- Surviving reel of Labor's Reward (1925, 13 min.), surviving reel showing the American Federation of Labor's argument for buying union made goods.
- Listen to Some Words of Wisdom (1930, 2 min.), why personal thrift feeds the Great Depression.
- The Godless Girl (1928, 128 min.), sensational film about girls' reformatories; directed by Cecil B. DeMille (this is his last completely silent film).

Disc 4 – "Americans in the Making"

- Emigrants Landing on Ellis Island (1903, 2 min.), actual footage of the event; photographed by Alfred C. Abadie.
- An American in the Making (1913, 15 min.), U.S. Steel film promoting immigration and industrial safety.
- Ramona (1910, 16 min.), Helen Hunt Jackson's classic about racial conflict in California; directed by D. W. Griffith and starring Mary Pickford.
- Redskin (1929, 82 min.), racial tolerance epic shot in two-strip Technicolor. Richard Dix plays Wing Foot, son of a Navajo chief who suffers heartache and prejudice before the film's happy ending with Wing Foot bringing peace between the Navajo and Pueblo peoples; about half the film features two-tone color using red and green filters; a technique already used in the 1910s but not often employed due to the extra work and expense. In "Redskin" color is used only for the scenes showing the Navajo and Pueblo Indian people and their land. Directed by Victor Schertzinger.
- United Snakes of America (ca. 1917, 1 min.), World War I cartoon assails home front dissenters.
- Uncle Sam Donates for Liberty Loans (1919, 1 min.), a patriotic cartoon encouraging Americans to buy Liberty Loans.
- 100% American (1918, 14 min.), a young "thriftless" woman impassioned to start saving in order to buy Liberty Loans; directed by Arthur Rosson and starring Mary Pickford.
- Bud's Recruit (1918, 26 min.), brothers serve their country; directed by King Vidor (this is his earliest surviving film).
- The Reawakening (1919, 10 min.), documentary about helping disabled veterans build new lives after the war.
- Eight Prohibition Newsreels (1922–23, 13 min.), footage on raids along with various opinions about the effectiveness of Prohibition.

=== Treasures IV: American Avant-Garde Film, 1947–1986 (2008) ===
- Number of discs: 2
- Number of films: 26
- Date range: 1947–1986
- Total runtime: 312 min. (5.2 hrs.)
- Booklet: 70-page book of program notes; foreword by Martin Scorsese

Independent cinema from Bruce Baillie to Andy Warhol, artists who worked outside the mainstream and redefined American film are collected in this set. An array of films never before released on VHS or DVD with styles ranging from animation to documentary are showcased in this collection of classics and rediscoveries, selected from five of the nation's foremost avant-garde film archives.

Select reviews:

- Henderson, B (March 3, 2009). "Treasures IV: American Avant-Garde Film (1947–1986)," Slant Magazine.
- Lim, D (March 1, 2009). "Avant-garde film gems in 'Treasures IV' collection," The Los Angeles Times.

The films:

Disc 1

- Film No. 3: Interwoven (1947–49, 3 min.) - Harry Smith
- Notes on the Circus (1966, 12 min.) - Jonas Mekas
- Here I Am (1962, 10 min.) - Bruce Baillie
- Fake Fruit Factory (1986, 22 min.) - Chick Strand
- Odds & Ends (1959, 4 min.) - Jane Conger Belson Shimane
- Eyewash (1959, 3 min.) - Robert Breer
- Peyote Queen (1965, 9 min.) - Storm de Hirsch
- 7362 (1967, 10 min.) - Pat O'Neill
- Aleph (1956–66(?), 8 min.) - Wallace Berman
- Note to Patti (1969, 7 min.) - Saul Levine
- By Night with Torch and Spear (1940s?, 8 min.) - Joseph Cornell
- The Riddle of Lumen (1972, 13 min.) - Stan Brakhage
- The End (1953, 34 min.) - Christopher Maclaine

Disc 2

- Bridges-Go-Round (1958, 4 min.) - Shirley Clarke
- Go! Go! Go! (1962–64, 11 min.) - Marie Menken
- Little Stabs at Happiness (1959–63, 15 min.) - Ken Jacobs
- Chumlum (1963, 23 min.) - Ron Rice
- Mario Banana (No. 1) (1964, 4 min.) - Andy Warhol
- I, an Actress (1977, 9 min.) - George Kuchar
- The Off-Handed Jape... and How to Pull It Off (1967, 8 min.) - Robert Nelson, William T. Wiley
- New Improved Institutional Quality (1976, 10 min.) - Owen Land
- Hamfat Asar (1965, 13 min.) - Larry Jordan
- Necrology (1969–70, 11 min.) - Standish Lawder
- Fog Line (1970, 11 min.) - Larry Gottheim
- (nostalgia) (1971, 36 min.) - Hollis Frampton
- Bad Burns (1982, 6 min.) - Paul Sharits

=== Treasures 5: The West, 1898–1938 (2011) ===
- Number of discs: 3
- Number of films: 40
- Date range: 1898–1938
- Total runtime: 596 min. (9.9 hrs.)
- Booklet: 132-page book

A set celebrating the dynamic, gender-bending, ethnically diverse West that flourished in early motion pictures, including both narrative and nonfiction films; travelogues from 10 western states Kodachrome home movies; newsreels about Native Americans; and documentaries and industrial films about such Western subjects as cattle ranching.

Select reviews:

- Kehr, D (September 23, 2011). "The West, When It Was Still Wild," New York Times.

The films:
Disc 1

- The Tourists (1912, 6 min.), tourists run amuck in Albuquerque's Indian market; directed by Mack Sennett and starring Mabel Normand.
- The Sergeant (1910, 16 min.), first surviving narrative shot in Yosemite; directed by Francis Boggs.
- Salomy Jane (1914, 87 min.), a tale of the California Gold Rush; directed by Lucius Henderson and William Nigh and starring Beatriz Michelena, America's first Latina movie star.
- Sunshine Gatherers (1921, 10 min.), canning California Del Monte brand canned fruits, in Prizmacolor; directed by George E. Stone.
- Deschutes Driftwood (1916, 10 min.), riding the rails along the Deschutes and Columbia Rivers.
- The "Promised Land" Barred to "Hoboes" (1936, 2 min.), this newsreel story reports on a crackdown of individuals hopping freight trans.
- Last of the Line (1914, 26 min.), a cross-cultural tragedy; directed by Jay Hunt, produced by Thomas Ince, and starring Sessue Hayakawa.
- The Indian-detour (1926, 16 min.), in the Southwest on a Fred Harvey Company motor tour.
- Native Americans in Newsreels (1921–1938, 5 min.), five newsreels stories about Native Americans.
- We Can Take It (1935, 21 min.), Civilian Conservation Corps at work.

Disc 2

- Over Silent Paths (1910, 16 min.), daughter avenges her father's murder; directed by D. W. Griffith.
- Life on the Circle Ranch in California (1912, 12 min.), documentary about cattle ranching in Santa Monica, California; directed by John B. O'Brien.
- Broncho Billy and the Schoolmistress (1912, 14 min.), America's first cowboy star courts a pistol-packing schoolmarm; directed and starring Gilbert M. Anderson.
- How the Cowboy Makes His Lariat (1917, 3 min.), Pedro León demonstrates the vaquero's art.
- Mexican Filibusters (1911, 16 min.), intrepid woman does her bit for the Mexican Revolution; directed by Kenean Buel.
- The Better Man (1912, 12 min.), Mexican bandit proves his worth; directed by Rollin S. Sturgeon.
- Ammunition Smuggling on the Mexican Border (1914, 41 min.), Texas sheriff reenacts kidnapping by revolutionists in this docudrama.
- Lake Tahoe, Land of the Sky (1916, 6 min.), travelogue celebrating the new auto road. Despite the title, the last two minutes feature the Historic Columbia River Highway and include the Mitchell Point Tunnel there.
- Mantrap (1926, 71 min.), wilderness comedy with Clara Bow and a woman-hating attorney; directed by Victor Fleming.
- From The Golden West (1938, 8 min.), excerpts from a longer film that documents the Los Angeles region; shot by an unknown amateur filmmaker.

Disc 3

- The Lady of the Dugout (1918, 64 min.), story about a bank robber with a heart of gold; directed by W. S. Van Dyke and starring Al Jennings.
- From Passing of the Oklahoma Outlaw (1915, 13 min.), excerpts from a lost docudrama, the celebrated frontier marshal Bill Tilghman reenacts his capture of the Wild Bunch; directed and starring Tilghman.
- The Girl Ranchers (1913, 14 min.), comedy in which sisters inherit the Rough Neck Ranch; directed by Al Christie.
- Legal Advice (1916, 13 min.), a cowboy falls for a lady attorney; produced, directed, written, and starring Tom Mix.
- From Womanhandled (1925, 55 min.), these three excerpts cover most of the original film, which is now lost in its completed form; directed by Gregory La Cava.
- Beauty Spots in America: Castle Hot Springs, Arizona (1916, 6 min.), Castle Hot Springs was a spa for the rich and famous.
- Romance of Water (1931, 10 min.), how Los Angeles got its water.
- A New Miracle in the Desert (1935, 1 min.), bringing Colorado River water to California.
- The West in Promotional Travelogues (1898–1920, 22 min.), tours in seven states; produced by James White.

== Awards for the Treasures DVDs ==
2000

- National Society of Film Critics' Film Heritage Award

2001

- Video Software Dealers Associations's Best of Show Non-Theatrical Award

2004

- National Society of Film Critics' Film Heritage Award

2005

- Il Cinema Ritrovato Festival, Best DVD Series

2009

- National Society of Film Critics' Film Heritage Award
- Il Cinema Ritrovato Festival, Best Avant-Garde Publication

2011

- True West Magazine, Best Classic Western DVD

== Film archives participating in the series ==
- Academy Film Archive of the Academy of Motion Picture Arts and Sciences
- Alaska Film Archives, University of Alaska Fairbanks
- Anthology Film Archives
- George Eastman House
- Japanese American National Museum
- Library of Congress
- Minnesota Historical Society
- Museum of Modern Art
- National Air and Space Museum
- National Archives
- National Center for Jewish Film
- National Museum of American History
- National Museum of Natural History
- New York Public Library
- New Zealand Film Archive
- Northeast Historic Film
- Pacific Film Archive
- UCLA Film & Television Archive
- West Virginia State Archives
