= List of American films of 1901 =

American films were released in 1901 from American Mutoscope and Biograph, Edison, Lubin, and Selig.

Title	Director	Cast	Genre	Notes
Acrobats in Cairo				
An Affair of Honor				
Another Job for the Undertaker	Edwin Stanton Porter			
Arrival of Tongkin Train				
The Artist's Dilemma	Edwin Stanton Porter			
Band and Battalion of the U.S. Indian School				
Barnum and Bailey's Circus				
Beef Extract Room				
Boxing in Barrels				
Branding Hams				
Buffalo Street Parade				
A Busy Corner at Armour's				
The Bund, Shanghai				
Circular Panorama of the Base of the Electric Tower, Ending Looking Down the Mall				
Circular Panorama of the Electric Tower and Pond				
Circular Panorama of the Esplanade with the Electric Tower in the Background				
Coaling a Steamer, Nagasaki Bay, Japan				
Convention of Railroad Passengers				
Cornell-Columbia-University of Pennsylvania Boat Race at Ithaca, N.Y., Showing Lehigh Valley Observation Train				
Couchee Dance on the Midway				
The Donkey Party				
The Finish of Bridget McKeen				
Follow the Leader				
The Fraudulent Beggar				
Fun at a Children's Party				
A Good Joke				
The Gordon Sisters Boxing				
Grand Entry, Indian Congress				
Happy Hooligan April-Fooled				
Happy Hooligan Surprised				
Harbor of Shanghai				
A Hold-Up				
Ice-Boat Racing at Redbank, N.J.				
Indians No. 1				
Jeffries and Ruhlin Sparring Contest at San Francisco, Cal., November 15, 1901				
A Joke on Grandma				
Kansas Saloon Smashers				
Launching of the New Battleship 'Ohio' at San Francisco, Cal. When President McKinley Was There				
Laura Comstock's Bag-Punching Dog				
The Life of a Fireman				
Love by the Light of the Moon				
The Martyred Presidents				
Midway Dance				
Miles Canyon Tramway				
Montreal Fire Department on Runners				
Mounted Police Charge				
The Old Maid Having Her Picture Taken				
Opening of the Pan-American Exposition Showing Vice President Roosevelt Leading the Procession				
Pan-American Exposition by Night				
Panorama of the Exposition, No. 1				
Panorama of the Exposition, No. 2				
Panoramic View of the Fleet After Yacht Race				
Panoramic View of the Temple of Music and Esplanade				
Panoramic View, Asheville, N.C.				
Le Petit chaperon rouge				
Photographing the Audience				
Pie, Tramp and the Bulldog				
President McKinley and Escort Going to the Capitol	Thomas Edison			
President McKinley Taking the Oath	Thomas Edison			
President McKinley's Speech at the Pan-American Exposition				
Pyrate Bay	S-			
The Queen's Funeral				
Le Rêve de Noël				
Rocking Gold in the Klondike				
Ruhlin in His Training Quarters				
Shad Fishing at Gloucester, N.J.				
Terrible Teddy, the Grizzly King				
The Tramp's Dream				
Tramp's Nap Interrupted				
Trapeze Disrobing Act				
A Trip Around the Pan-American Exposition				
Turkish Dance				
Twelve in a Barrel				
Two Rubes at the Theatre				
Upper Falls of the Yellowstone				
Washing Gold on 20 Above Hunker, Klondike				
Wedding Procession in Cairo				
Why Mr. Nation Wants a Divorce				
Wonderful Trick Donkey, The				
The Yacht Race Fleet Following the Committee Boat 'Navigator' Oct. 4th				
You Can't Lose Your Mother-in-Law				

== See also ==
- AFI Catalog of Feature Films
- 1901 in the United States
