= 23 skidoo =

Early 20th century American slang phrase

23 skidoo (sometimes 23 skiddoo) is an American slang phrase generally referring to leaving quickly, being forced to leave quickly by someone else, or taking advantage of a propitious opportunity to leave. Popularized during the early 20th century, the exact origin of the phrase is uncertain.

23 skidoo has been described as "perhaps the first truly national fad expression and one of the most popular fad expressions to appear in the US", to the extent that "Pennants and arm-bands at shore resorts, parks, and county fairs bore either [23] or the word 'Skiddoo'."

"23 skidoo" combines two earlier expressions, "twenty-three" (1899) and "skidoo" (1901), both of which, independently and separately, referred to leaving, being kicked out, or the end of something. "23 skidoo" quickly became a popular catchphrase after its appearance in early 1906.

"23 skidoo" has been often used as a nonsense word without a specific meaning.

== Origin ==
Although there are a number of stories suggesting the possible origin of the phrase, none have been universally accepted.

=== Flatiron Building ===
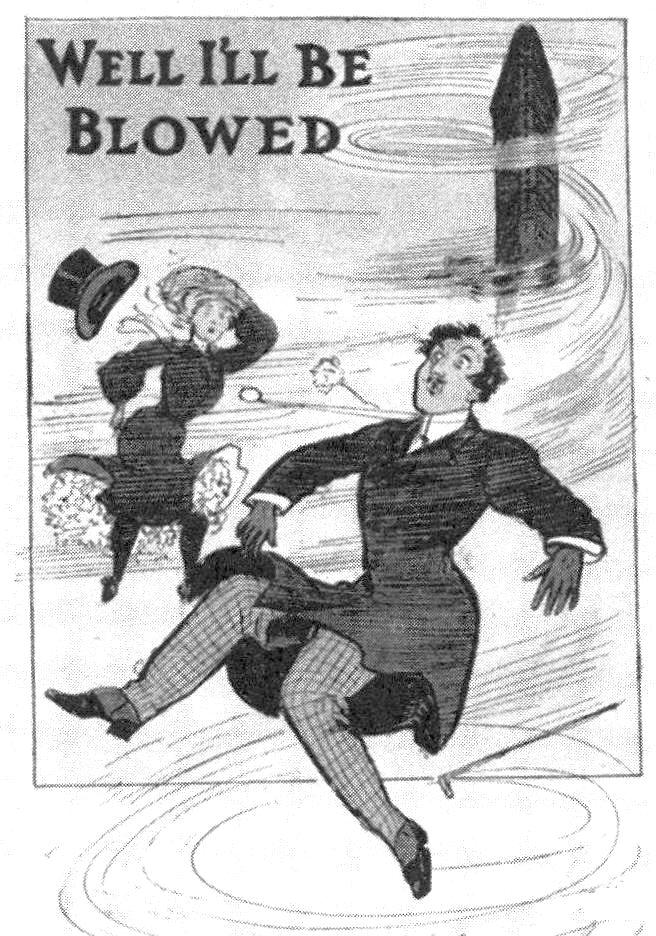
"Well I'll be blowed", postcard of the Flatiron Building, c. 1905

A woman's skirt blows up on 23rd Street, c. 1901 (from What Happened on Twenty-third Street, New York City dir. George S. Fleming and Edwin S. Porter). Police discouraging onlookers were said to be "giving them the 23 Skidoo".

Perhaps the most widely known story of the origin of the expression concerns the area around the triangular-shaped Flatiron Building at Madison Square in New York City. The building is located on 23rd Street at the intersection of Fifth Avenue and Broadway, the latter two of which intersect at an acute angle. Because of the shape of the building, winds swirl around it. During the early 1900s, groups of men reportedly gathered to watch women walking by have their skirts blown up, revealing legs, which were seldom seen publicly at that time. Local constables, when sometimes telling such groups of men to leave the area, were said to be "giving them the 23 Skidoo". An early nickelodeon film, What Happened on Twenty-third Street, which dates from 1901, shows a woman's skirt being lifted by the updraft from a ventilation grate, exposing her knees.

Some consider the Flatiron Building origin claim dubious because the slang expressions "23" and "skidoo" were already in use before 1902, the year in which the Flatiron Building was built.

=== "23" (or "Twenty-Three") ===
The earliest-known report of the slang expression "23" (or "twenty-three") as a code word for asking someone to leave is a newspaper reference on March 17, 1899:

For some time past there has been going the rounds of the men about town the slang phrase "Twenty-three." The meaning attached to it is to "move on," "get out," "good-bye, glad you are gone," "your move" and so on. To the initiated it is used with effect in a jocular manner.

It has only significance to local men and is not in vogue elsewhere. Such expressions often obtain a national use, as instanced by "rats!" "cheese it," etc., which were once in use throughout the length and breadth of the land.

Such phrases originated, no one can say when. It is ventured that this expression originated with Charles Dickens in the Tale of Two Cities. Though the significance is distorted from its first use, it may be traced. The phrase "Twenty-three" is in a sentence in the close of that powerful novel. Sidney Carton, the hero of the novel, goes to the guillotine in place of Charles Darnay, the husband of the woman he loves. The time is during the French Revolution when prisoners were guillotined by the hundred. The prisoners are beheaded according to their number. Twenty-two has gone and Sidney Carton answers to – Twenty-three. His career is ended and he passes from view.

At the time, a stage version of A Tale of Two Cities, The Only Way, was playing in London. The production moved to New York City later that year; it opened at the Herald Square Theatre on September 16, 1899. Less than two months later, popular slang author George Ade described having heard a new slang expression, "twenty-three":

By the way, I have come upon a new piece of slang within the past two months and it has puzzled me. I just heard it from a big newsboy who had a 'stand' on a corner. A small boy with several papers under his arm had edged up until he was trespassing on the territory of the other. When the big boy saw the small one he went at him in a threatening manner and said: 'Here! Here! Twenty-three! Twenty-three!' The small boy scowled and talked under his breath, but he moved away. A few days after that I saw a street beggar approach a well-dressed man, who might have been a bookmaker or horseman, and try for the usual 'touch'. The man looked at the beggar in cold disgust and said: 'Aw, twenty-three!' I could see that the beggar didn't understand it any better than I did. I happened to meet a man who tries to 'keep up' on slang and I asked [about] the meaning of 'Twenty-three!' He said it was a signal to clear out, run, get away.

In the same interview, Ade described two purported origin stories he had heard: that it was "from the English race tracks, twenty-three being the limit on the number of horses allowed to start in one race" or that it had been a signal used in a plot to free a Mexican embezzler from custody in New Orleans.

=== Skidoo ===
Webster's New World Dictionary derives skiddoo (with two d's) as probably from skedaddle, meaning "to leave", with an imperative sense.

The word Skidoo was the name of a Lark-class racing sailboat that competed in races on Long Island Sound during the 1901 racing season. The Skidoo competed every summer through at least 1904.

Skidoo is attested, in its conventional, slang sense, by 1904. Skidoo-wagon (as well as "skidoodle wagon" and "skedaddle wagon") was a short-lived euphemism for automobiles during 1904–1905.

The word skidoo, used by itself as a noun denoting a supposed bringer of bad luck, is attested in the early 1910s, in P. G. Wodehouse's Psmith, Journalist. It appeared in newspapers as early as 1906.

The Ski-Doo brand grew from Bombardier's 1959 introduction of a compact snowmobile. The vehicle was initially intended to be called Ski-Dog, as a modern alternative to sled dogs. However, due to a typographical error, either in a brochure or painted on the prototype, the name appeared as "Ski-Doo", which the company retained, partly due to its distinctiveness and trademark potential.

=== Twenty-three, skidoo! ===
Both of the slang expressions, 23 and skidoo, were used in George M. Cohan's 1904 musical play Little Johnny Jones. Numerous news items from the period credited either Cohan or Tom Lewis (the actor performing the role that spoke those lines in the play) with creating or popularizing one or both of the expressions. Even before the expression "23, skidoo!" became popular in its own right, 23 (or twenty-three) and skidoo were frequently used in conjunction with, or near, one another in the same sentence or paragraph; 23 often as part of the phrase "23 for you [or yours]." For example, "Skiddoo! Git! Twenty-three for yours!", or "Twenty-three for his! Skidoo."

The earliest known use of the expression, in the familiar "23, skidoo!" form, is an advertisement for Billy B. Van's show The Errand Boy:

Billy B. Van's Great Hit, in "The Errand Boy." 23--Skiddoo!! by Miller and Boecher.

The phrase quickly became a ubiquitous catchphrase, and Google Books has many examples of commercial advertisements using "23-Skidoo" that begin in 1906. For example, the edition of The Shoe Retailer for August 4, 1906, volume 59, No. 5 (Boston, MA), has a full-page ad for a "23-Skidoo" sale, with blurbs such as "23-Skidoo/Says Low Price to the Shoe/Now It's Up to You".

On the RMS Titanic there was a watertight door on E Deck numbered 23 which was informally called the "skidoo door" according to the testimony of the Chief Baker Charles John Joughin.

=== Other explanations ===
- Cartoonist "TAD" (Thomas A. Dorgan) was credited in his 1929 obituary in The New York Times as being the "First to say 'Twenty-three, Skidoo.'"
- Baseball player Mike Donlin and comedian Tom Lewis may have created the expression as part of their vaudeville act.
- An article in the June 26, 1906 New York American credits the phrase to Patsey Marlson, then a former jockey hauled into court on a misdemeanor charge. At his hearing, Marlson is asked by the judge how the expression came about. He explains that when he was a jockey, he worked at a track which only had room for 22 horses to start in a line. If a 23rd horse was added, the long shot would be lined up behind the 22 horses on the front line. Apparently, "23 skidoo" implied that if the horse in the back was to have any chance of winning, it would really have to run very fast. Marlson also says in the article that the expression was originally "23, skidoo for you."
- A parody of Henry Miller's well-regarded stage presentation of Charles Dickens's 1859 novel A Tale of Two Cities may have also been the beginning of the phrase. Miller's 1899 production, entitled The Only Way, was staged at the Herald Square Theatre. The final scene of the play portrays a series of executions at a guillotine. As each person is beheaded, an old woman counts. When Sydney Carton, the protagonist of the story, is beheaded, the old woman calls out "Twenty-three!" The grisly scene was remarkable for its time, but it soon became the subject for parody, and the phrase "Twenty-three, skidoo!" was used by Broadway comedians to parody this moment. This seems likely to be an instance of comedians using an already-popular slang juxtaposed against a well-known dramatic moment for the resulting comic effect, and not an indication of invention, although the theatrical usage may have popularized the expression, or made it more widely known.
- It is said that 23 was an old Morse code signal used by telegraph operators to mean "away with you." (The same story accounts for 30 as "end of transmission", a code still used by modern journalists in North America, who place -30- at the end of articles as a sign to editors. However, the Western Union 92 Code, which is the source of 30 and other numbers like 73 and 88 still used in amateur radio, lists 23 as "all stations copy".)
- An early 1900s Death Valley town had 23 saloons (many basically tents). A visit to all, going 23 skidoo, meant having a very good time.
- Death Valley National Park interpreters have sometimes given as an explanation that the early 1900s mining town of Skidoo, California, required that a water line be run from the source of water on Telescope Peak to the town – a distance of 23 miles. Most thought it would be easy, but the immensely hard rock along the course made it very difficult; it was eventually accomplished by a determined engineer. The term "23 Skidoo" was then used as a statement of irony, something like "duck soup": a reference to something apparently easy, but actually very difficult. Other interpreters simply say the 23-mile pipeline and the popular slang phrase is what gave the town its name.
- A jump rope rhyme that ended up "butterfly, butterfly, twenty three to do" dates to 1909 and may be the origin of this phrase.
- In The Literature of Slang (p. 38), W. J. Burke claims that the term "skidoo" was coined in 1906 by the musical comedy star Billy B. Van, citing an article in the Indianapolis Morning Star, March 31, 1906.
- In the 1977 book The Age of Uncertainty by John Kenneth Galbraith, Skidoo 23 refers to the abandonment of a town, Skidoo, in the Panamint Mountains of Death Valley National Park in California in the early 1900s. The number 23 apparently refers to the number of miles water had to be piped to the town and its sole reason for being: the mining of gold. After the mines were depleted, the town ceased to exist.
- In the 1913 book The Confessions of a Con Man as Told to Will Irwin by Will Irwin, 23 relates to a rigged dice game called a cloth that travelled with small American circuses and carnivals in the latter part of the 19th century. It referred to a square marked 23 You Lose on the cloth which had 48 printed squares but only the one You Lose square. After making a big bet, the sucker was at some point persuaded that he had rolled a 23, had thereby lost his money and should stop squawking and beat it. This became, by a logical extension, an in-crowd, underworld expression indicating that for whatever reason the person addressed would not get what he was seeking and should clear out.

== In popular culture ==
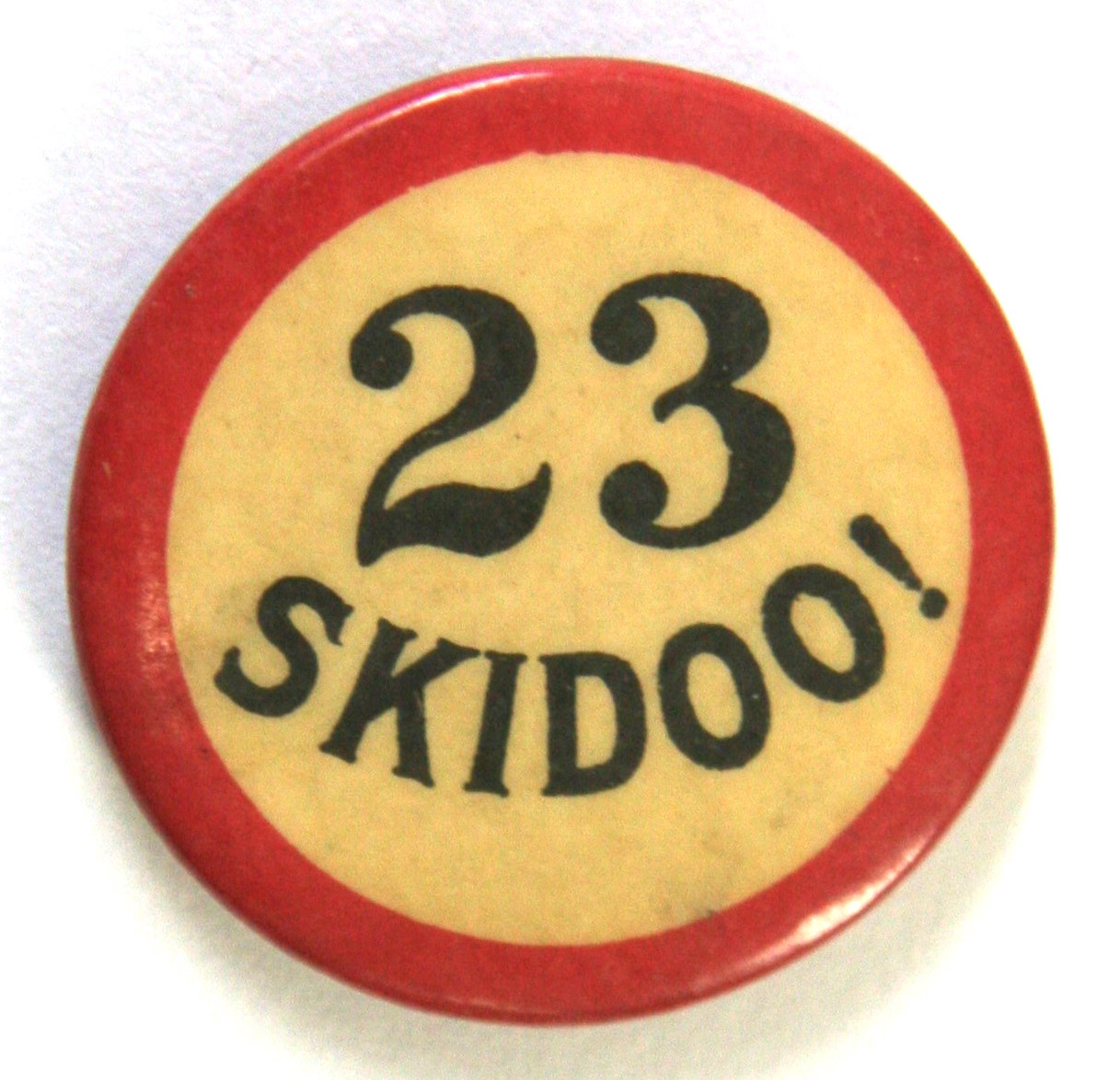
"23 SKIDOO!" on an early 20th century pin-back button

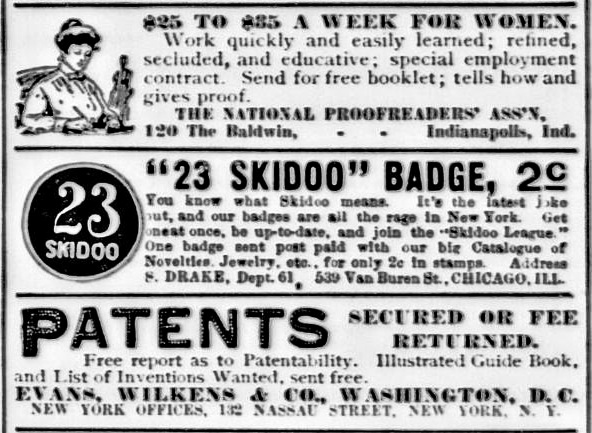
Advertisement for a 23 Skidoo Badge in The New York Tribune (29 July 1906)

=== Early 20th century ===
- The Love Sonnets of a Car Conductor (1908):
  A True McGlook once handed this to me:
  When little Bright Eyes cuts the cake for you
  Count twenty ere you eat the honey-goo
  Which leads to love and matrimony – see?
  A small-change bunk what's bats on spending free
  Can't four-flush when he's paying rent for two.
  The pin to flash on Cupid is 'Skidoo!'
  The call for Sweet Sixteen is 23."
  — Wallace Irwin, The Love Sonnets of a Car Conductor, 1908
- The House Boat Boys; or Drifting Down to the Sunny South (1912):
  "Just back up along the beach, and if you make the first move to do anything I'm going to shoot. Now, twenty-three for yours, mister, Skidoo! We don't want your company; not today," said Thad.
  — St. George Rathbone, The House Boat Boys (1912)
- Make Way for Tomorrow (1937):
  " – Say 99. – What for? That can't cure a cold. I'd rather say 23 to you, but I guess you're too young to know that means "skidoo."
- A Tree Grows in Brooklyn (1943):
  He dispersed the crowd very simply by telling them he'd send for the pie wagon and take them all down to the station house if they didn't twenty-three skidoo.
  — Betty Smith, A Tree Grows in Brooklyn
- Cheaper by the Dozen (1948):
  He took Mother for a ride in his first automobile ... As Dad and Mother, dressed in dusters and wearing goggles, went scorching through the streets of Boston, bystanders tossed insults and ridicule in their direction... "Get a horse. Twenty-three skidoo."
  — Frank B. Gilbreth and Ernestine Gilbreth Carey, Cheaper by the Dozen
- The saying was in popular usage prior to 1912, as it appears in the transcript of the Titanic Inquiry:
  6341. Then was it that watertight door, which you see on the plan is in the alleyway, which is in front of your room?
  – I am not sure, but I think it is No. 23 door.
  6342. I do not know their numbers, but was it the one just forward of your room?
  – Yes, in the alleyway.
  6343. And you actually saw them doing that?
  – Yes, they were working on it.
  6344. You are quite right; it is No. 23 door?
  – We used to call it the skidoo door, on account of the number. That is how I remember the number.
  6345. (The Commissioner.) I do not understand that?
  - It is an American joke.
  6346. Will you explain it?
  – I could not explain it, my Lord.
  6347. (The Solicitor-General.) At any rate, it connects No. 23 with something about skidoo?
  – Yes.
- Aleister Crowley in The Book of Lies (c. 1912–13) titled Chapter 23 "Skidoo", with the comment that "23" and "Skidoo" are American words meaning "Get out".

=== Later use ===
- In an episode of Popeye the Sailor Man (1954), titled "Taxi-Turvy", Olive Oyl asks Popeye to take her to 23 Skidoo Street: "23 Skidoo Street, driver."
- William S. Burroughs wrote a short story in 1967 titled "23 Skidoo Eristic Elite".
- There is a post-punk band originating in the 1970s named 23 Skidoo.
- The password '23skidoo' was used by Microsoft to encrypt WFWSYS.CFG configuration file using RC4, which was used in early Windows for Workgroups installations.
- John Prine uses the phrase as an address in the chorus of his song, "Jesus, the Missing Years" from the 1991 album The Missing Years. ("They all reside down the block inside of 23 Skidoo.")
- In The Simpsons 1994 episode "Burns' Heir", Mr. Burns calls "5-23-skidoo-hut-hut" while attempting to play American football.
- The 2005 hiphop track "Sofa King" by Danger Doom includes the line "Spat what he knew, energy for true. To all fake rappers, twenty-three skidoo."

== See also ==
- 23 enigma
- 6-7
