= Move On =

Move On may refer to:

== Songs ==
- "Move On" (ABBA song)
- "Move On" (4th Avenue Jones song)
- "Move On" (David Bowie song)
- "Move On" (Jonas Brothers song)
- "Move On" (David Jordan song)
- "Move On" (Modern Romance song)
- "Move On" (No Doubt song)
- "Move On" (Rain song)
- "Move On" (The Warren Brothers song)
- "(So Tired of Standing Still We Got to) Move On", 1991 song by James Brown
- "Move On", a song by Jet from the 2003 album Get Born
- "Move On", a song by ATB from the album Distant Earth
- "Move On", a song by Stephen Sondheim from the 1984 musical Sunday in the Park with George
- "Move On", a song by Slaughterhouse
- "Move On", a song by Korn from the album Korn III: Remember Who You Are
- "Move On", a song by Clare Dunn
- "Move On", a song by Paul Stanley from his first solo album, Paul Stanley
- "Move On", a song by Mike Posner from his 2019 album A Real Good Kid
- "Move On", a song by Steve Aoki from his 2022 album Hiroquest: Genesis
- "Move On", a song by Clint Lewis from the 2023 Indian film Garudan

== Television episodes ==
- "Move On" (Desperate Housewives), 2005

== Film ==
- Move On (1903 film), a short film directed by Alfred C. Abadie
- Move On (1917 film), a short comedy film directed by Billy Gilbert and Gilbert Pratt
- Move On (2012 film), a film directed by Asger Leth and written by Matt Greenhalgh

== Organizations ==
- MoveOn, a progressive public policy advocacy group and political action committee
