= Harrisburg, California =

Harrisburg, California may refer to:

- Harrisburg, former name of Warm Springs, Fremont, California
- Harrisburg, Inyo County, California
