= Gilbert Sarony =

- Born: 1858; Toronto, Canada
- Died: December 15, 1910 (aged 52); Pittsburgh, U.S.
- Known for: Comedian, female impersonator

Gilbert Sarony (c.1858 – December 15, 1910) was a Canadian-born comedian and female impersonator in vaudeville as well as early Edison Manufacturing, American Mutoscope, and Siegmund Lubin films. Some sources use the spelling Saroni. In his obituary in Variety he was described as one of the first impersonators of the "old maid" type and was said to be "considered one of the funniest men in the show business."

He was born in Toronto in about 1858, and in 1881 was recorded as working in England as a comedian with the Australian Mammoth Minstrels troupe. He later performed in the United States. His vaudeville performances included minstrel shows where he donned blackface using burnt cork and mimicked African-American characters. He also performed with song and dance team Kelly and Waters. He appeared in a series of early Edison films with Old Maid in the title and had catchphrases.

His performances used pronounced facial expressions for levity.

He was a best man at Annie Hindle's wedding. He died of uremia in Pittsburgh on December 15, 1910, at the stated age of 52.

== Filmography ==
- How Bridget Made the Fire (1900)
- The Finish of Bridget McKeen (1901)
- Old Maid in the Drawing Room (1901)
- The Old Maid Having Her Picture Taken (1901)
- The Old Maid in the Horsecar (1901)
- Gilbert Saroni Preparing for His Act (1903), a Siegmund Lubin film
- The Old Maid’s Lament (1903)
- Burglar and Old Maid (1903)
- Country Sport and Old Maid (1903)
- The Farmer and the Old Maid (1903)
- Giddy Old Maid (1903)
- Old Maid Courtship (1903)
- Old Maid’s Ballet Dance (1903)
- The Old Maid’s Lament (1903)
- Old Maid’s Morning Greeting (1903)
- Old Maid's First Visit to a Theater (1903)
