= From Leadville to Aspen: A Hold-Up in the Rockies =

1906 American film

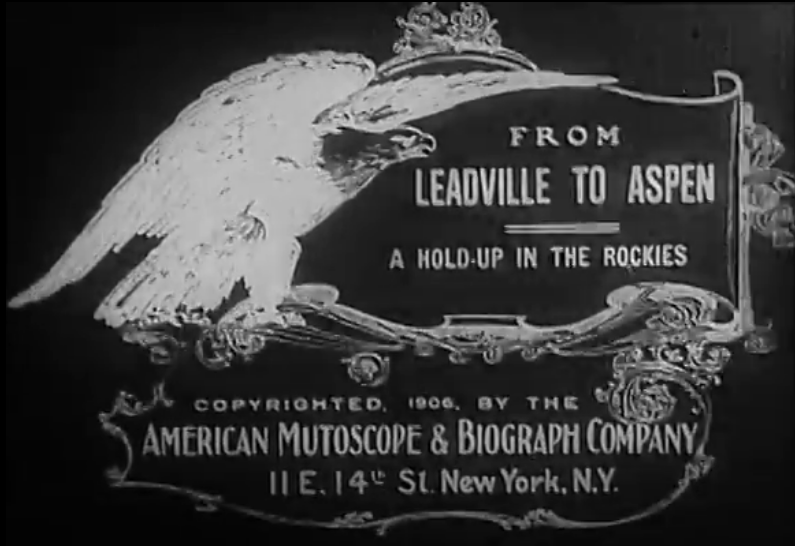
- Directed by: Wallace McCutcheon and Frank J. Marion
- Produced by: American Mutoscope & Biograph Company
- Cinematography: G.W. Bitzer
- Distributed by: American Mutoscope & Biograph
- Release date: June 30, 1906
- Running time: 8 minutes
- Country: United States
- Languages: Silent; English intertitles

From Leadville to Aspen: A Hold-Up in the Rockies is a 1906 American black-and-white short silent Western film from American Mutoscope & Biograph Company. It was directed by Wallace McCutcheon and Frank J. Marion (uncredited) with G.W. Bitzer as cinematographer.

== Plot ==
In the Rocky Mountains, a train is en route from Leadville, Colorado to Aspen. Two bandits erect a pile of logs on the line, causing the engineer to stop the train. The bandits systematically rob the passengers at gunpoint and then make their getaway along the tracks. Later, they hijack a horse and cart.

== Production ==
From Leadville to Aspen is an example of the "phantom rides" genre of film, which show the film from the perspective of the railcar.

The film was produced specifically for Hale's Tours of the World. George C. Hale took the phantom ride genre a step further by transforming a railcar into a theatre to show these films. Such was the case with From Leadville to Aspen. What is unique about this film, however, is that it was a fiction film rather than simply a scenic film, as other Hale Tours films had been. Realistic sound effects were added to the experience.

The outside scenes of From Leadville to Aspen wer shot in Phoenicia, New York on the Ulster and Delaware Railroad with the holdup scene inside the railcar being shot in the Biograph studio.

== Music ==
While it is unknown what specific music was used to accompany the original film, MIT music professor Martin Marks provided accompaniment for inclusion of the film in More Treasures from American Film Archives intended to be historically representative of the genre. Selections included She'll Be Comin' Round the Mountain When She Comes and Beethoven's "Pathetique" Piano Sonata op. 12.
