= Arrival of Tongkin Train =

- Written by: American Mutoscope & Biograph films
- Release date: October 24, 1901
- Country: United States
- Languages: Silent film English intertitles

Arrival of Tongkin Train, also referred to as Arrival of Train, Tien-Tsin, is a 1901 documentary silent film showing the arrival of a train in Tianjin, China. The film was made by American Mutoscope and Biograph Company.

== See also ==
- List of American films of 1901
- American Mutoscope and Biograph Company
