= Eric Burroughs =

American actor (1911–1992)

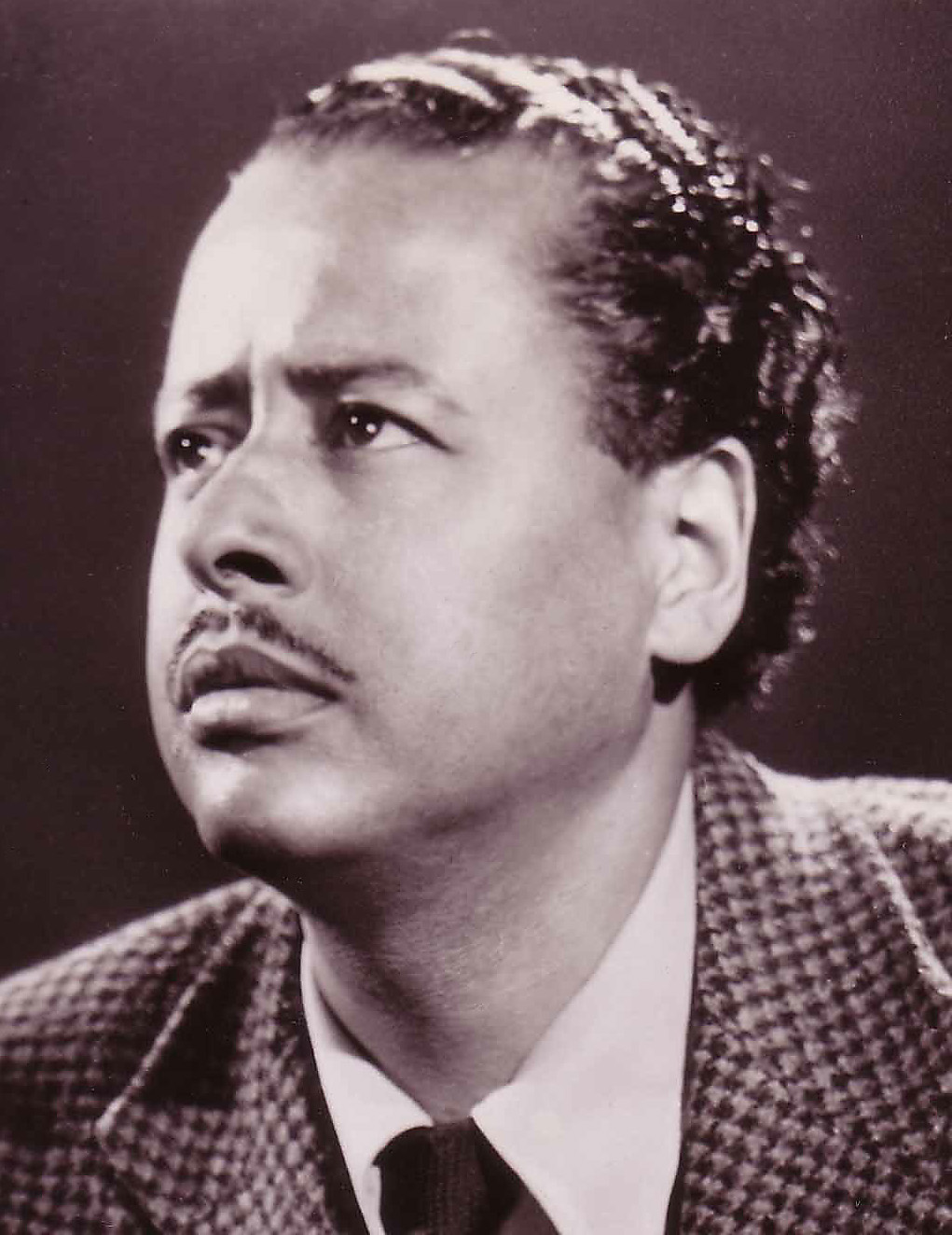
- Born: November 6, 1911; The Bronx, New York City, New York
- Died: November 12, 1992 (aged 81); The Bronx, New York City, New York
- Occupation: Actor

Eric Burroughs (November 6, 1911 – November 12, 1992) was an American stage and radio actor whose career spanned the 1930s to the early 1960s. He appeared in Orson Welles's all-Black Federal Theatre Project production of Macbeth. Burroughs was later lauded by radio giant Norman Corwin as being "the finest Negro actor in radio."

== Biography ==
=== Early years ===
Eric Burroughs was born in The Bronx, New York on November 6, 1911. He was the son of postal worker and Shakespearean reader Charles Burroughs and Williana Burroughs, a New York City public school teacher and Communist party activist.

In the late 1920s, after graduating from high school at the age of 16, Burroughs secured a minor role in the production Harlem, at the Apollo Theatre, starring Isabelle Washington, which ran for six months. His parents, however, wanted him to have a profession, and sent him to Germany to study political science. Instead, he quit after two weeks and enrolled in the Kammerspiele School of the Theatre, Hamburg, run by theatrical producer and director Erwin Piscator, regarded as the foremost exponent of "Epic Theater," a form that emphasized the socio-political content of drama. Burroughs appeared in a Piscator production of The Good Soldier Schweik, as well as various Shakespeare plays including The Merchant of Venice. In 1930 he attended the International Theatre Conference in Hamburg, where he met Tairoff, the director of the Kamerny Theatre, Moscow, and since his mother and brothers were already in the USSR, he accepted Tairoff's invitation to visit the USSR, where he stayed for six months. Returning to Germany, he launched a career in theatre and film. He remained until two weeks after Hitler came to power in 1933, then returned to New York.

Burroughs's German wife, Lotte Manshardt, followed him to New York and they attempted to start an independent theater company called Theater Mass. When this did not succeed, Manshardt returned to Germany in 1935.

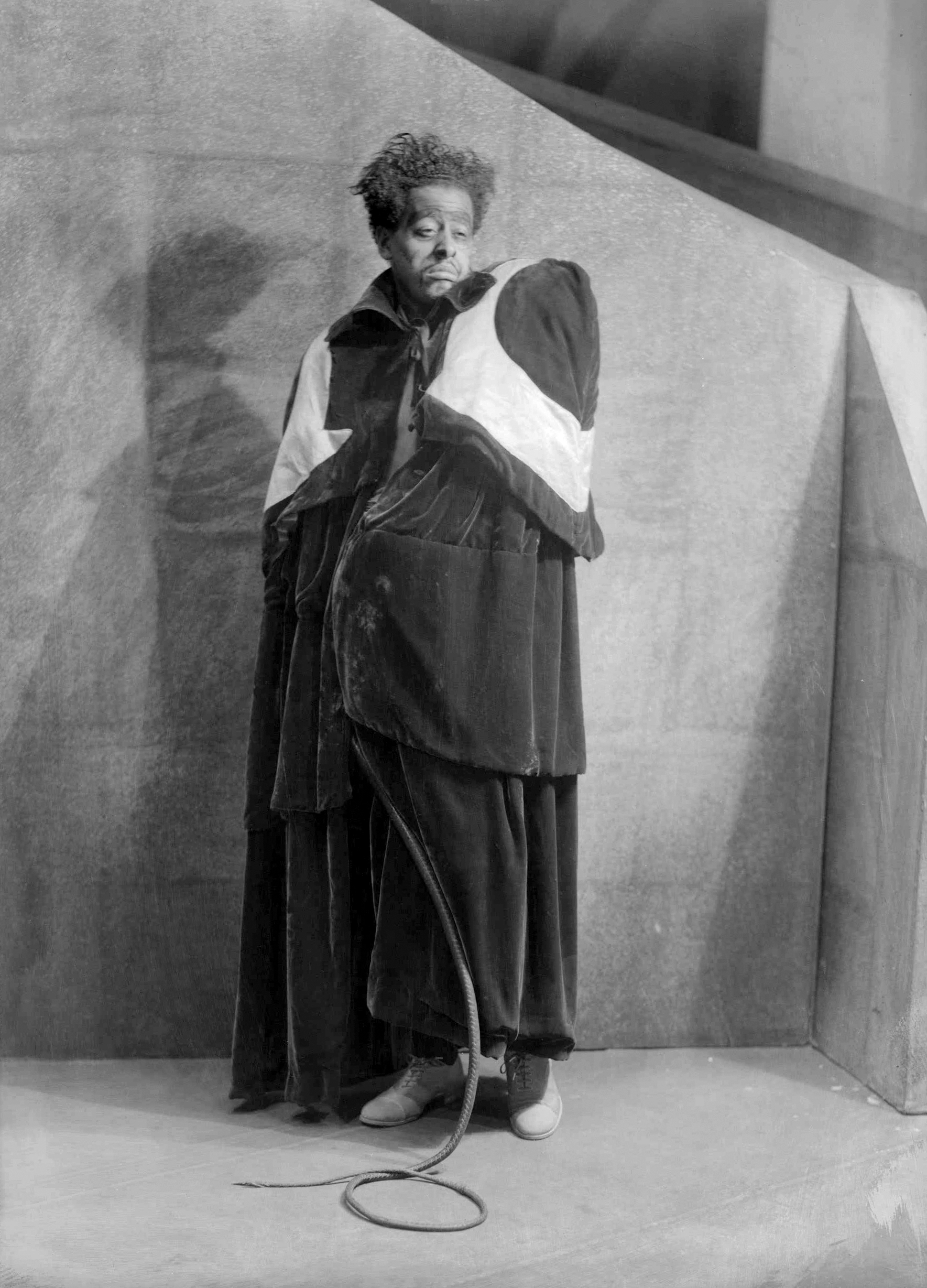
Burroughs as Hecate in the Voodoo Macbeth (April 14, 1936)

=== "Voodoo Macbeth" ===
During the Great Depression the Works Project Administration was given the task of reviving black theater in America. As a part of this effort Burroughs was named as a lead actor in the 20-year-old Orson Welles's 1936 Federal Theatre Project production of Macbeth, featuring an all-black cast.

In this production Burroughs played the role of Hecate, which Welles changed from the witch queen of the original into a male Voodoo priest, complete with cloak and a 12-foot long bull whip.

This staging of Voodoo Macbeth won both popular and critical acclaim, with The New York Times noting that Burroughs's concluding line, "The charm’s wound up!" at the fall of the closing curtain prompted a 15-minute frenzy of cheering throughout the 1200 seat Lafayette Theatre. Burroughs's final line concludes a four-minute excerpt of Macbeth in the WPA documentary short subject, We Work Again (1937). He also starred in the 1937 Broadway play Brown Sugar.

=== Later years ===
Norman Corwin cast Burroughs in the role of the Roman emperor Nero, sent by the Devil to assassinate Santa Claus, in Corwin's 1938 radio play The Plot to Overthrow Christmas. The play was produced again in 1940 and 1944.

During the 1940s and 1950s, Burroughs worked extensively in radio and in a more limited capacity on stage, appearing in a production of The Petrified Forest and in the role of Mr. D in Eartha Kitt's production of Mrs. Patterson. Burroughs also had a small speaking role in the 1959 film, Odds Against Tomorrow.

Burroughs married Melissa Broome in 1950 and had two children.

=== Death and legacy ===
Burroughs died November 12, 1992, at the Bronx Veterans Administration Hospital. He was 81 years old at the time of his death.

== See also ==
- Williana Burroughs
- Works Progress Administration
- Voodoo Macbeth
