= Boxing in Barrels =

- Written by: Lubin Films
- Produced by: Lubin Studios
- Release date: March 23, 1901
- Country: United States
- Languages: Silent film English intertitles

Boxing in Barrels is a silent film written and released by Lubin Studios in 1901. It features a man and a clown boxing in a barrel.

== See also ==
- List of American films of 1901
- Lubin Studios
- Boxing
