= La Charcuterie mécanique =

1896 film by Auguste and Louis Lumière

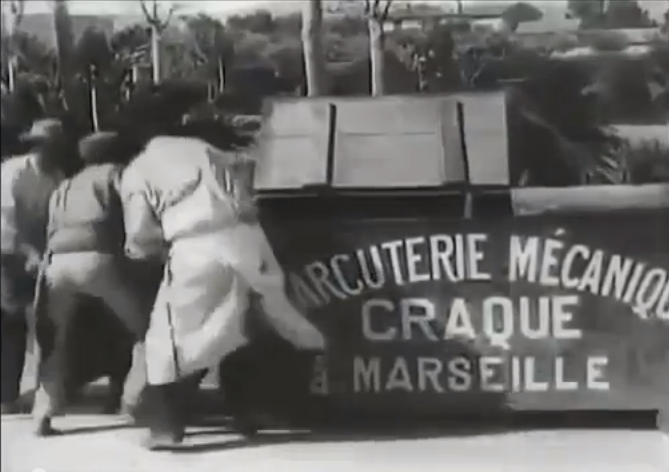
- Scene from the movie by Brothers Lumière
- Directed by: Louis Lumière
- Release date: 1895
- Running time: 49 seconds
- Country: France
- Language: silent

La Charcuterie mécanique

La Charcuterie mécanique (The Mechanical Butcher) is an 1895 "humorous subject" (as classed by its makers) created by the Lumière Brothers. In Phil Hardy's The Aurum Film Encyclopedia: Science Fiction it is listed as the first ever science fiction film. The action involves a live pig that is placed into a machine (essentially a large wooden container). The pig is then turned into various pork products, which are lifted out of the other end of the machine.

The theme was widely repeated in films such as Making Sausages (aka The End of All Things) (1897) by George Albert Smith, which depicted cats and dogs being converted into sausages (along with a duck and a boot) by a machine. American Mutoscope and Biograph made The Sausage Machine the same year, which was a parody of the conveyor belt system. Edison Studios followed with Fun in a Butcher Shop (1901) and Dog Factory (1904), both of which showed pet dogs, again being turned into sausages. The former showed simply a primitive crank, while the latter film depicted an electric machine with a reversible process.
