= We Work Again =

1937 American sponsored film

- Produced by: Work Projects Administration
- Release date: 1937
- Running time: 15 minutes
- Country: United States
- Language: English

We Work Again is a 1937 ephemeral film produced by the Work Projects Administration to promote its employment and training efforts for African-Americans during the Great Depression. Various jobs are shown, including public construction projects, domestic service and health care training, adult education programs and performing arts. It is particularly noted for containing the only existing footage of the 1936 Federal Theatre Project production of Macbeth, directed by Orson Welles and featuring an all-black cast.

== Production ==
We Work Again is a Work Projects Administration documentary short subject produced in 1937 by civil rights activist Alfred Edgar Smith, a member of President Franklin D. Roosevelt's Black Cabinet, and Pathé News. The film presents the positive impact of WPA employment and training programs for African-Americans. Scenes of unemployment are contrasted with scenes of those working in public building projects, land records management and nursery schools, being trained in health care and domestic service, and taking part in adult education classes. The film features programs available for visual artists, musicians, writers and theatre workers.

We Work Again has gained considerable attention because it includes the only known footage of the Negro Theatre Unit's 1936 production of Macbeth staged by Orson Welles. This footage consists of the last few minutes of the play. Maurice Ellis and Charles Collins appear as Macbeth and Macduff, indicating that the filming took place after July 16, 1936, when Ellis succeeded Jack Carter.

A copy of the film is preserved by the National Archives and Records Administration. The film has also been released on DVD on the 4-disc box set Treasures from American Film Archives, compiled by the National Film Preservation Foundation. It is one of the very few films of its genre ever to be released on DVD or any other home format. The film is in the public domain and as such has appeared on several websites, including the Internet Archive.

== Cast ==
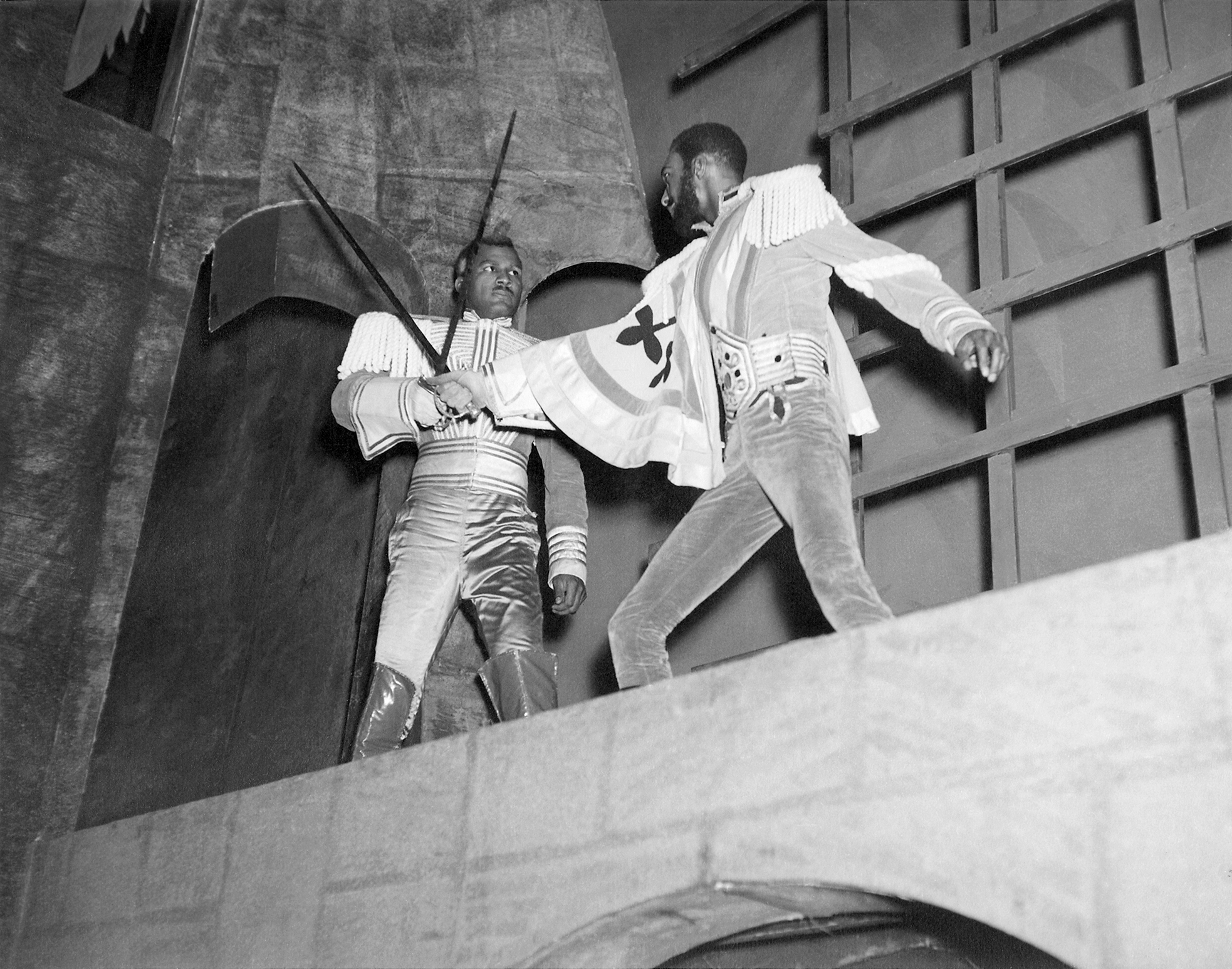
Macduff (Charles Collins) and Macbeth (Maurice Ellis) in the final scene of Macbeth

- William Lawrence, directing an art song ensemble
- Juanita Hall, leading a spiritual choir ("Ezekiel Saw the Wheel")

=== Voodoo Macbeth ===
- Maurice Ellis: Macbeth
- Charles Collins: Macduff
- Eric Burroughs: Hecate
- Zola King: Witch
- Josephine Williams: Witch
- Wilhelmina Williams: Witch

== See also ==
- Treasures from American Film Archives
