= Fog Line =

- Directed by: Larry Gottheim
- Distributed by: The Film-Makers' Cooperative
- Release date: 1970
- Running time: 11 minutes
- Country: United States
- Language: Silent

Fog Line is a 1970 short silent experimental film directed by Larry Gottheim. It shows a rural landscape with slowly dissipating fog.

== Description ==
The faintly visible shapes of the landscape become clearer over the course of the film.

Fog Line is a single, static 11-minute shot of a rural landscape. At the beginning of the film, heavy fog obscures the view. Two sets of telephone lines run across the frame, roughly trisecting the image (thus the title). Over the course of the film, the fog gradually clears, revealing various figures in the field. Several trees are scattered through the area. Two horses enter the frame and graze across the bottom of the image, and a bird flies across the field.

== Production ==
After completing his PhD at Yale University, Gottheim moved up to Binghamton University in New York. He shot Fog Line near his home there. He chose to film a section of the countryside through which horses passed in the morning. He studied the area for months and filmed it multiple times. Gottheim used a telephoto lens to shoot the film.

== Release ==
Fog Line screened at the New York Film Festival in 2005. A digital transfer was made for its inclusion in the 2008 DVD collection Treasures IV: American Avant-Garde Film, 1947-1986.

== Reception ==
Critic Dave Kehr called Fog Line "one of the most hauntingly beautiful of all avant-garde films". In his column for Take One, Bob Cowan praised it as among the best minimalist films he had seen, commenting, "It has a sense of the mysterious; one never knows the precise point at which the transformations take place." Director Paul Schrader remarked that it "demonstrates how magical waiting can be."

== See also ==
- Slow cinema
