= Williana Burroughs =

American teacher and politician (1882–1945)

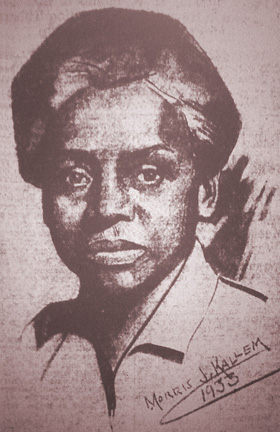
Drawing of Williana Burroughs from the 1933 election campaign, as published in The Daily Worker.

Williana "Liana" Jones Burroughs (January 2, 1882 – December 24, 1945) was an American teacher, communist political activist, and politician. She is best remembered as one of the first women to run for elected office in New York.

== Early years ==
Williana Jones, known to family and friends as "Liane," was born on January 2, 1882, in Petersburg, Virginia. Her mother had formerly been a slave for 16 years, her father died when Williana was just four years old. Her widowed mother left Virginia for New York City, bringing Williana together with a sister and a brother (Gordon Jones), where she worked as a cook. Her mother proved unable to care for her children adequately, however, so Williana spent the next seven years in the Colored Orphan Asylum, located at the time on the corner of 143rd Street and Amsterdam Avenue in Harlem. Her mother was able to retrieve her three children from the orphanage only when Williana was 11.

Williana attended public school in New York, where she was an excellent student. In 1909, Williana Jones married Charles Burroughs, a postal worker and actor. After graduation, she attended New York City Normal College, known today as Hunter College, where she achieved credentials to become a teacher. In 1910 she obtained her first teaching position, in charge of a first grade classroom.

In 1926, Burroughs moved to PS 48 in Queens, New York, where she taught first and second grade children. She was soon recruited into the New York City Teachers Union, in which she was active as part of the communist-led "Rank and File caucus."

== Political career ==
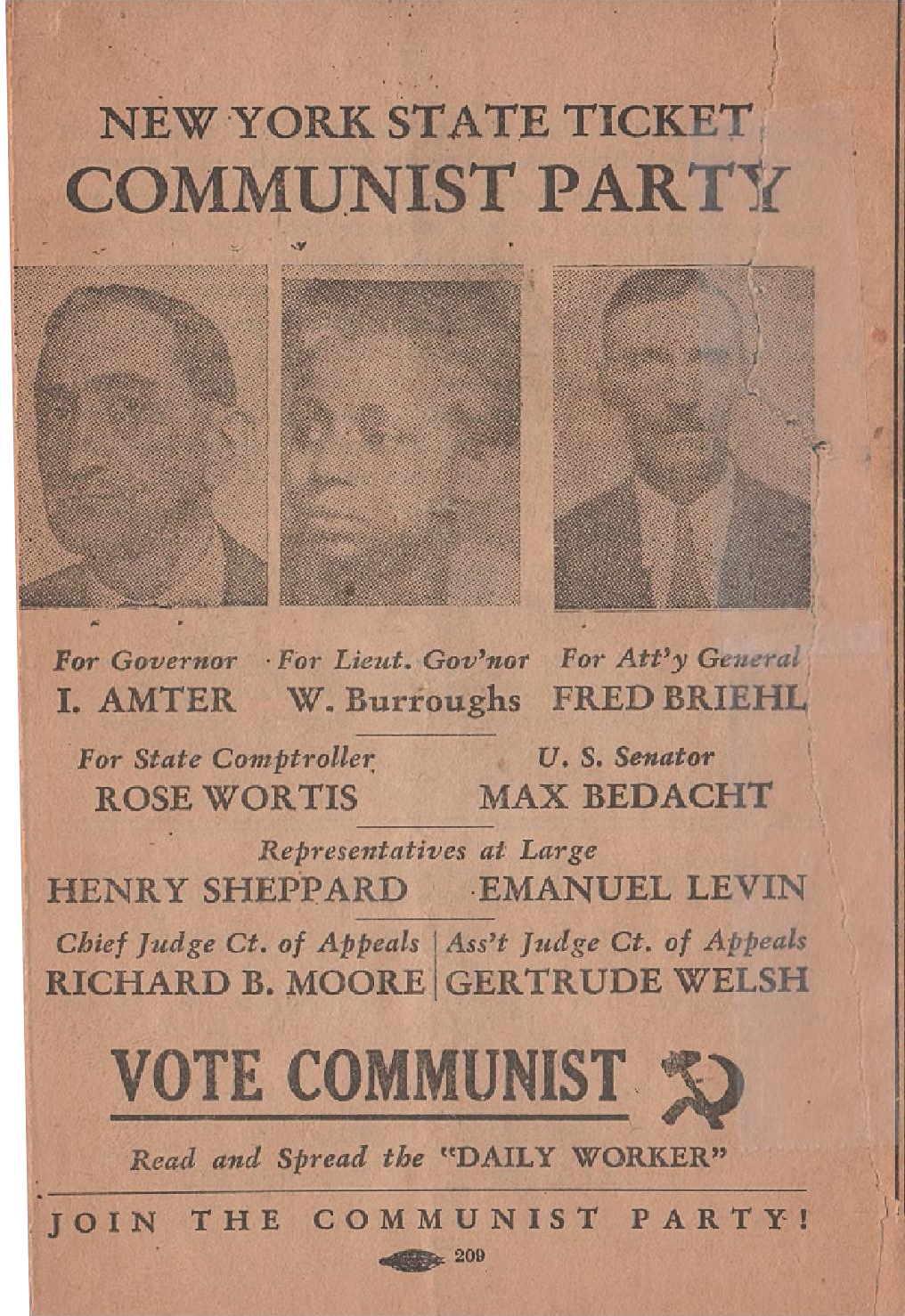
Burroughs as a candidate for lieutenant governor of New York on the Communist Party state ticket, 1934

Williana Burroughs joined the Workers (Communist) Party in September 1926. She became active in the campaign for defense of the Scottsboro boys and was chairman of the Blumberg Defense Council, an organization formed to defend Isidore Blumberg, a teacher removed from the New York public schools system due to his political views.

The Communist Party sent Burroughs to the 6th World Congress of the Communist International in Moscow in the summer of 1928 as a representative of the American Negro Labor Congress, a Communist Party auxiliary group. Burroughs traveled with her husband and her two youngest sons to the convention, with the boys remaining in the Soviet Union to attend school thereafter. Burroughs would not be reunited with them until 1937.

Burroughs made use of the pseudonym "Mary Adams" in the communist movement during the 1920s and 1930s, publishing an article for the party's daily newspaper under that name for May Day 1928. She became prominent within the party organization and was selected as an alternate delegate to the 6th National Convention of the Communist Party USA in March 1929.

Upon returning to the United States in January 1931, she resumed teaching. In 1933 Burroughs spoke out at a meeting of the New York City Board of Education, and in June 1933 Burroughs was dismissed from her post for "conduct unbecoming to a teacher and prejudicial to law and order."

After loss of her teaching position, Burroughs was the Communist Party's candidate for New York Comptroller in the fall of 1933 and the Communist Party's candidate for Lieutenant Governor of New York in 1934. She also ran the Harlem Worker's School from 1933 to 1934.

Burroughs was regarded as one of the CP's most effective witnesses during the public hearings over the 1935 Harlem riot.

She returned to the Soviet Union in the spring of 1937, the year of the Great Terror, where she worked as an announcer and editor for the English-language broadcasts of Radio Moscow, the international shortwave news service of the Soviet government. Burroughs remained in Moscow for virtually the rest of her life. In the spring of 1940 she made a request to return to the United States together with her sons but was persuaded to stay owing to the lack of capable Americans remaining in the USSR. The war intervened and Burroughs and her sons remained in Moscow until 1945, when she finally managed to return to New York with the younger boy.

== Death and legacy ==
Williana Jones Burroughs died on December 24, 1945, at the Manhattan home of her friend Hermie Huiswoud, just two months after her return to the United States and barely more than a week before what would have been her 64th birthday.

Her son Charles Burroughs, the oldest of the boys who had been left in Moscow, retained his American citizenship and was inducted into the U.S. Army early in 1945. After his military service he returned to the United States and in 1961 co-founded the DuSable Museum of African American History in Chicago, of which he remained curator until 1980. A Chicago high school is named after him.

Her son Eric Burroughs became a stage and radio actor.

Her granddaughter Carola Burroughs was interviewed by Yelena Demikovsky for the documentary Black Russians - The Red Experience, about African-Americans who moved to the Soviet Union.

== Works ==
- (as "Mary Adams"): "Record of Revolts in Negro Workers' Past," The Daily Worker, May 1, 1928.
- The Road to Liberation for the Negro People. Contributor with A.W. Berry; Benjamin J. Davis; James W. Ford; Benjamin Carreathers; Angelo Herndon; William L. Patterson; Harry Haywood; Timothy Holmes; Manning Johnson; Richard B. Moore; William Taylor; Louise Thompson; Maude White; Henry Winston; Merrill Work. New York: Workers Library Publishers, 1939.
