= Harrisburg, Inyo County, California =

Unincorporated community in California, United States

Harrisburg
- Unincorporated community
- Location in California Harrisburg (the United States)
- Coordinates: 36°21′50″N 117°06′41″W
- Country: United States
- State: California
- County: Inyo
- Elevation: 4,990 ft (1,520 m)

Harrisburg (formerly Harrisberry) is an unincorporated community in Inyo County, California, United States. It lies at an elevation of 4987 feet (1520 m).

The town was originally named for Shorty Harris and Peter Aguerreberry, discoverers of gold near the site in 1905.

Harrisburg was said to reach approximately 300 at peak population but is currently uninhabited.

== Eureka Mine ==
Between the years of 1905 and 1945, Harrisburg (then Harrisberry) was the site of Eureka mine, which started as a joint venture. Aguerreberry and Captain Fleece, an otherwise unknown figure in history, fought over the land in 1907-1909 and Aguerreberry ended up with possession of the site. He also constructed a two-room structure with a gas stove and fridge, and later in 1941 constructed a guest house.

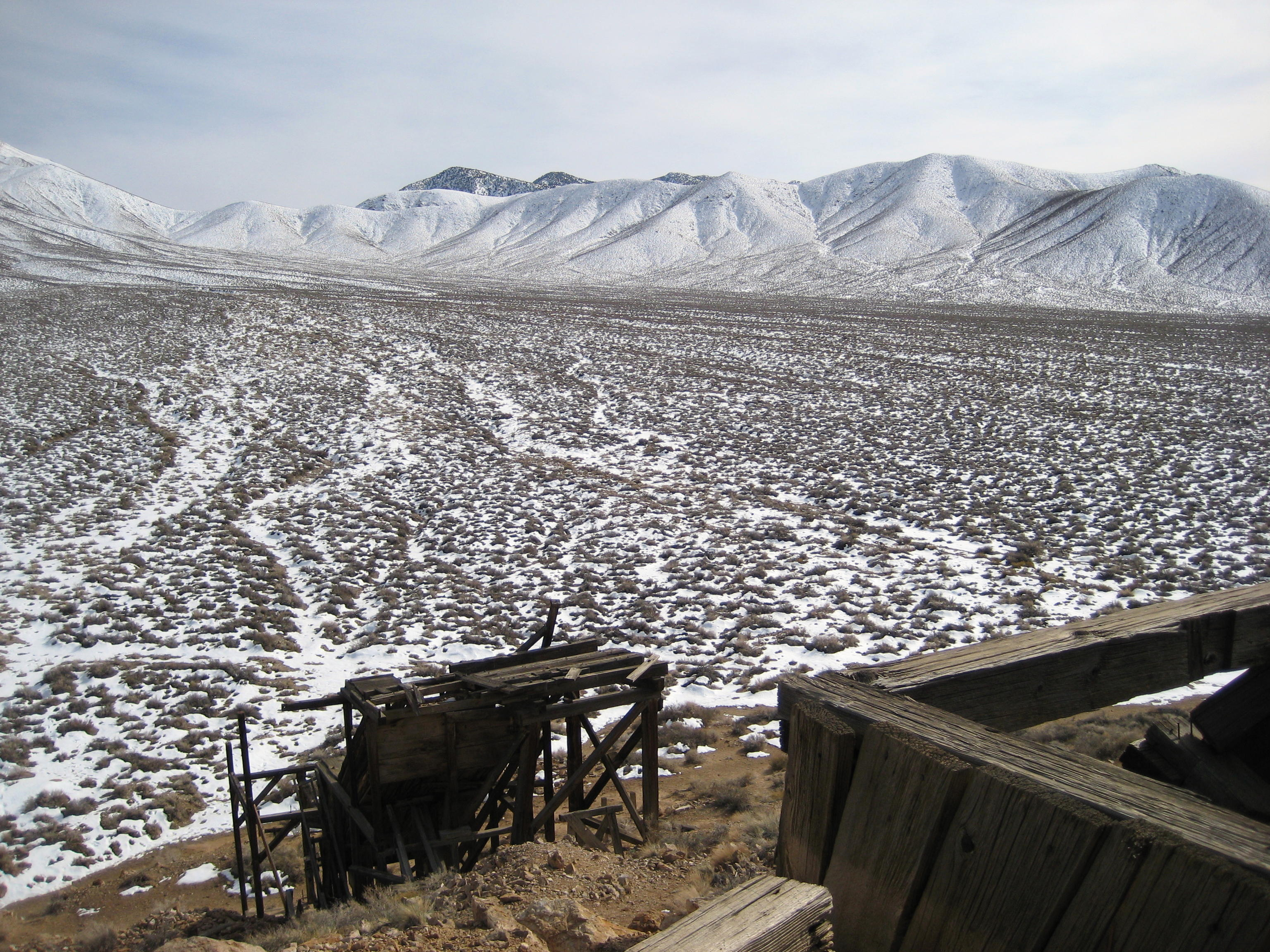
Eureka Mine & Cashier Mill

Between 1907 and Aguerreberry's death in 1945, he mostly worked this site alone, in contrast to the more commercial and industrial enterprises to the north nearer Skidoo.

He died on November 23, 1945 and in 1946 an additional hut was constructed, probably by his nephew, Joseph, the administrator of his estate. The mine is not currently accessible to the public due to dangerous conditions.

== See also ==
- Skidoo, California
