= The Old Maid Having Her Picture Taken =

1901 film by Edwin S. Porter

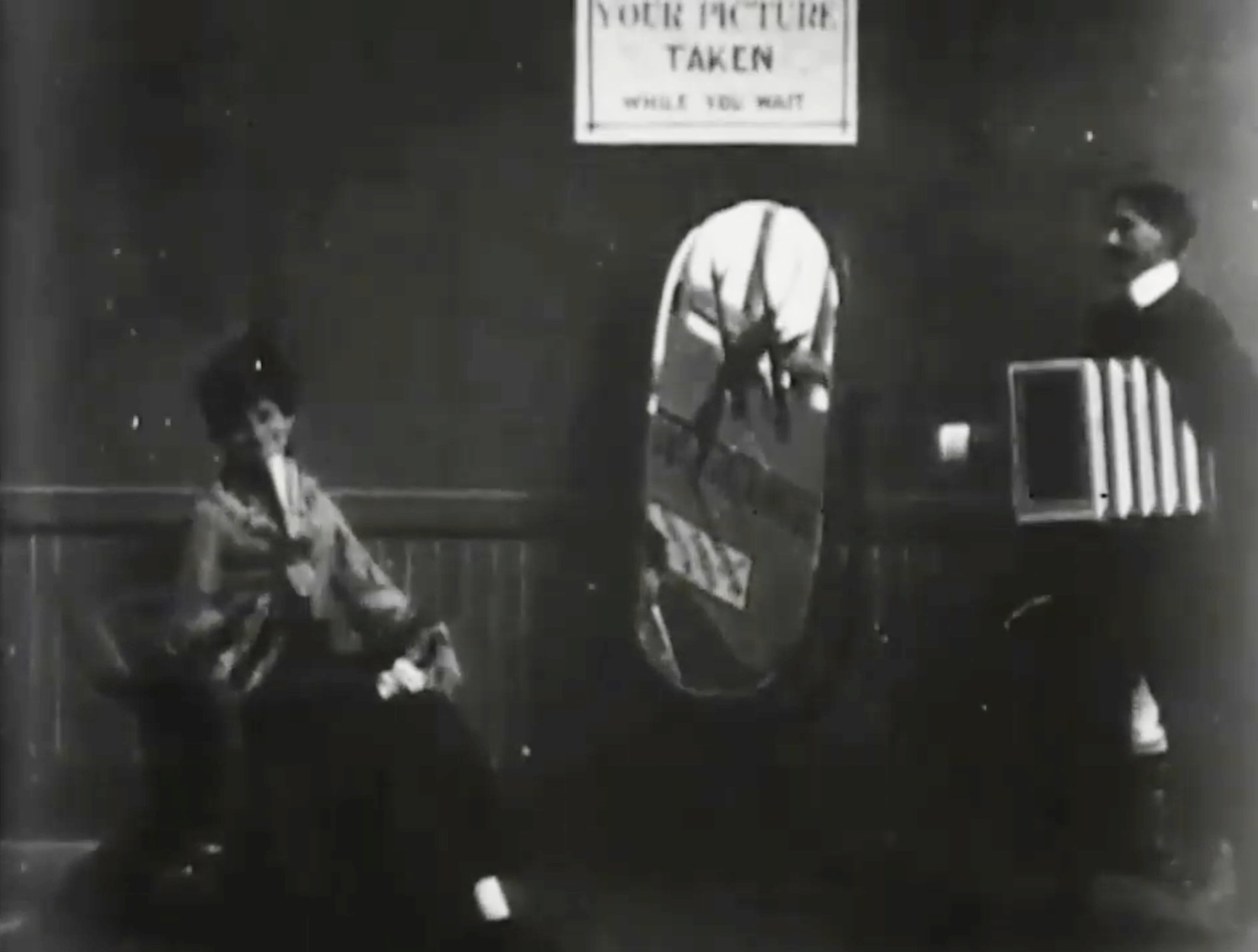
- Directed by: Edwin S. Porter
- Distributed by: Edison Manufacturing Company
- Release date: March 1, 1901
- Running time: 1:15
- Country: United States
- Language: Silent/English

The Old Maid Having Her Picture Taken is a 1901 silent short film directed by Edwin S. Porter in collaboration with George S. Fleming. The comic film depicts an unattractive old woman (played by celebrated vaudeville female impersonator Gilbert Saroni) arriving at a photo studio to have her picture taken, and destroying all of the equipment through the power of her ugliness.

The film exhibitor could pair this film with another 1901 Porter film, The Old Maid in the Drawing Room (also known as The Old Maid in the Horsecar), which was simply a shot of Saroni as the old maid, talking excitedly and making funny facial expressions.

According to Charles Musser in Before the Nickelodeon, "It was suggested that the old maid was busy talking about her adventures at the photo gallery. Thus, if the exhibitor desired, he could combine these two single-shot films to create a more elaborate subject."

== Plot ==
The Old Maid Having Her Picture Taken (1901)

In the film, the old maid is seen in the photo studio, which has a sign that reads "Your Picture Taken While You Wait". The photographer leaves the parlor, and the woman looks at a collection of photographs on the wall. As she gazes at them, the photographs fall to the floor, startling her. She then looks at the clock on the wall; the hands begin to spin crazily, and then the clock joins the photographs on the floor.

Undaunted, the old maid preens in the mirror, which then cracks. When the photographer returns, he's upset to see the mess in his studio, but he seats the woman and prepares to take her picture. As she gazes at the lens, the camera explodes in a shower of dust, comically startling the old maid.

== Reception ==
In Sex Seen: The Emergence of Modern Sexuality in America, Sharon Ullman writes, "[The old maid's] countenance has remarkable destructive power... To modern eyes, it looks like an old joke, and no doubt it echoed with familiarity in 1901 as well. That familiarity is precisely the mechanism by which we are able to identify the woman as a sexual — or, in this case, asexual — icon."

== See also ==
- Edwin S. Porter filmography
