= Kansas Saloon Smashers =

1901 film by Edwin Stanton Porter

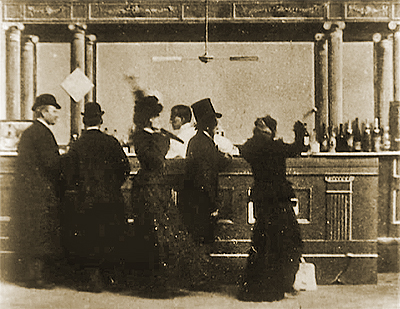
- Nation and her followers attack the saloon
- Directed by: Edwin S. Porter
- Production company: Edison Studios
- Distributed by: Edison Studios
- Release date: March 16, 1901
- Running time: 1 minute
- Country: United States
- Language: Silent

Kansas Saloon Smashers is a 1901 comedy short film produced and distributed by Edison Studios. Directed by Edwin S. Porter, it is a satire of American activist Carrie Nation. The film portrays Nation and her followers entering and destroying a saloon. After the bartender retaliates by spraying Nation with water, policemen order them out; the identities of the actors are not known. Inspiration for the film was provided by an editorial cartoon which appeared in the New York Evening Journal.

Kansas Saloon Smashers became a success upon its March release, and inspired other films about Nation to be produced by Lubin Manufacturing Company and Biograph Company. It was not the only film produced by Edison Studios to mock Nation; released the same year, Why Mr. Nation Wants a Divorce parodied the relationship between Nation and her husband. A print of the film is preserved in the Library of Congress, and it was released on DVD in 2007.

== Plot ==
A bartender is working at a saloon, serving drinks to customers. After he fills a stereotypically Irish man's bucket with beer, Carrie Nation and her followers burst inside. They assault the Irish man, pulling his hat over his eyes and then dumping the beer over his head. The group then begin wrecking the bar, smashing the fixtures, mirrors, and breaking the cash register. The bartender then sprays seltzer water in Nation's face before a group of policemen appear and order everybody to leave.

== Production ==
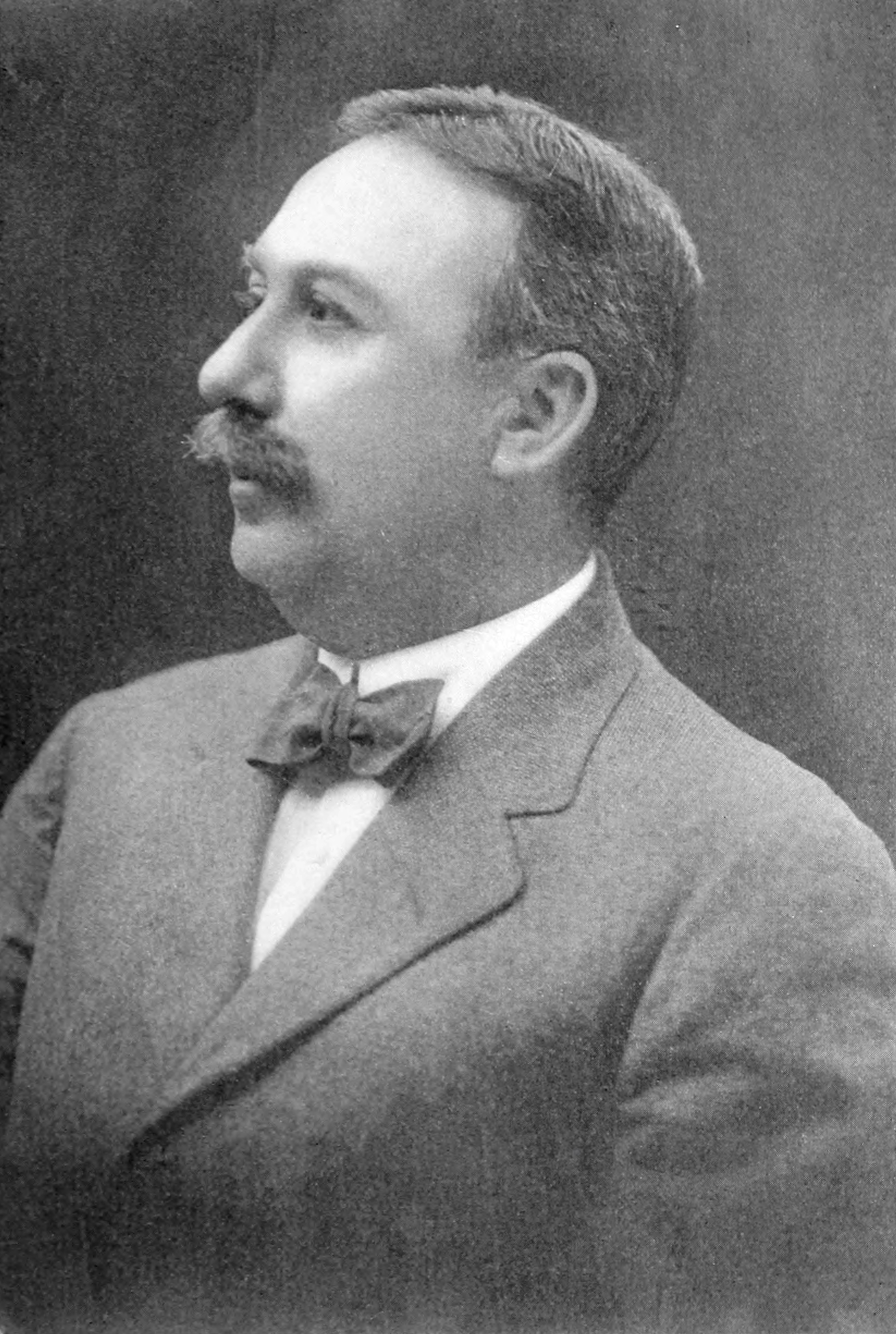
Edwin S. Porter, the film's director

After American activist Carrie Nation first attacked a saloon in December 1900, silent motion pictures dealing with the subject of alcohol began to be produced, a testament to Nation's national notoriety and her influence over studios at the time. Kansas Saloon Smashers was produced by Edison Studios as a parody of Nation's crusade. Charles Musser, a film historian, writes that "the front page of the New York Journal was an excellent indicator of events considered worthy of the Kinetograph Department's attention throughout 1901–1902."

The director of Kansas Saloon Smashers was Edwin S. Porter, a projectionist who came to work for Edison as a cameraman in 1900. Eventually, Porter became the director responsible for all of Edison Studios' output. Porter based the set off of a photograph of a wrecked saloon which appeared in the Journal, while the characters and plot were based on editorial cartoons published in the paper. Porter frequently read the publication when he wanted inspiration on topics that filmgoers would be interested in.

With production supervised by James H. White, Porter was assisted by George S. Fleming during the creation of Kansas Saloon Smashers. Fleming was an actor and scenic designer at Edison Studios, who had joined the studio in January 1901. Porter operated the camera for the film, and also developed the footage. Kansas Saloon Smashers marked one of the first short films to be created under Fleming and Porter's partnership. While none of the identities of the people who appeared in the picture are recorded, it is known the women in the film were played by men in drag, rendering them sexually unattractive.

Kansas Saloon Smashers features stop action techniques, used to portray Nation destroying the bar; it was shot in black-and-white. A copyright was filed for the film on February 2, 1903. The finished product comprised around 60 to 65 feet (around 18 m) of 35 mm film. Kansas Saloon Smashers was not the only satire of Nation to be produced by Edison Studios. Why Mr. Nation Wants a Divorce, a comedy picture released the same year, was inspired by news articles on Nation's husband requesting a divorce.

== Critical analysis ==
The complete film

Kansas Saloon Smashers has been categorized as burlesque, re-enactment, and political satire. Being based on a recent news event, it is noted as helping further the "visual newspaper" style of film. The short portrays saloons as positive, sanitary places rather than immoral establishments. In Musser's book The Emergence of Cinema, he writes that "the women's invasion of a male refuge is seemingly attributed to sexual frustration and the concomitant need for revenge," while author Karen Blumenthal opined that Kansas Saloon Smashers suggests women were only attacking due to a few miscreants being present in the establishments.

Film critic Dave Kehr noted in a 2007 The New York Times article that, along with Why Mr. Nation Wants a Divorce, the film now seems dated due to the fact that "the evil influence of liquor is no longer the burning question it was". Critic Alan Scherstuhl wrote in Village Voice that the film worked as "evidence that the first things our visual mass-media culture sold to its audience were comic licentiousness — and the impulse to clean such filth up."

== Release ==
Initially advertised as Mrs. Carrie Nation and Her Hatchet Brigade, Kansas Saloon Smashers was distributed by Edison Studios and first released on March 16, 1901. A unique publicity still was created for the film, a rare occasion at the time. Upon release, the film was screened at Bradenburgh's Ninth and Arch Street Museum in Philadelphia, where it received an entire bill. Nevertheless, the short made Nation and her followers incensed, and Nation found the view of saloons Porter's film offered to be "disturbing".

The film proved to be very successful, inspiring other films about Nation to be produced by other studios; Biograph Company made Carrie Nation Smashing a Saloon in April, while Lubin Manufacturing Company had produced a film entitled Mrs. Nation and Her Hatchet Brigade by early March. Siegmund Lubin had attempted to capitalize on the success of Kansas Saloon Smashers by making a film where Nation herself appeared; when he was unable to contact her, an actress was hired to play her. Lubin arranged with a Camden bar owner to film a staged destruction scene; however, the actress proved so convincing that bystanders began to destroy the bar for real and Lubin was forced to pay up to seven hundred dollars damage.

Kansas Saloon Smashers film is now in the public domain, and a paper print is preserved in the Library of Congress. This paper print was used to recover the film for a 2007 DVD release, as part of the compilation Social Issues in American Film 1900–1934. The compilation, part of the Treasures from American Film Archives produced by the National Film Preservation Foundation, features several films from the period which had particular focus on common issues at their releases. The other Edison-produced Nation film, Why Mr. Nation Wants a Divorce, is also included.

== See also ==
- Edwin S. Porter filmography

== Bibliography ==
- Blumenthal, Karen (2011). Bootleg: Murder, Moonshine, and the Lawless Years of Prohibition. Roaring Brook Press. ISBN 978-1-4668-0158-5.
- Dunkleberger, Amy (2007). So You Want to Be a Film Or TV Director?. Enslow Publishers. ISBN 978-0-7660-2738-1.
- Eckhardt, Joseph P. (1997). The King of the Movies: Film Pioneer Siegmund Lubin. Fairleigh Dickinson Univ Press. ISBN 978-0-8386-3728-9.
- Grace, Fran (2001). Carry A. Nation: Retelling the Life. Indiana University Press. ISBN 0-253-10833-0.
- Langman, Larry (1998). American Film Cycles: The Silent Era. Greenwood Publishing Group. ISBN 978-0-313-30657-0.
- Mennel, Barbara (2008). Cities and Cinema. Routledge. ISBN 978-1-134-21983-4.
- Moore, James P. (2009). Prayer in America: A Spiritual History of Our Nation. Doubleday Religious Publishing Group. ISBN 978-0-307-55037-8.
- Musser, Charles (1990). The Emergence of Cinema: The American Screen to 1907. University of California Press. ISBN 978-0-520-08533-6.
- Musser, Charles (1991). Before the Nickelodeon: Edwin S. Porter and the Edison Manufacturing Company. University of California Press. ISBN 978-0-520-06986-2.
- Niver, Kemp R. (1967). Motion Pictures From The Library of Congress Paper Print Collection 1894-1912. University of California Press. GGKEY:H0RZ324XH81.
- Pizzitola, Louis (2002). Hearst Over Hollywood: Power, Passion, and Propaganda in the Movies. Columbia University Press. ISBN 978-0-231-11646-6.
- Slide, Anthony (1994). Early American Cinema. Scarecrow Press. ISBN 978-0-8108-2722-6.
