= Alfred C. Abadie =

American photographer (1878–1950)

- Born: Alfred Camille Abadie; December 9, 1878; New York City
- Died: January 1, 1950 (aged 71); San Francisco
- Years active: 1896-1917
- Spouse: Natalie Evaline Harris Abadie

Alfred Camille Abadie (December 9, 1878 – January 1, 1950) was an American photographer and pioneer filmmaker who worked for Thomas Edison. He specialized in actuality films, a predecessor to the standard form of documentary. In 2019, Abadie's Emigrants Landing at Ellis Island was included in the annual selection of 25 motion pictures added to the National Film Registry of the Library of Congress, being deemed "culturally, historically, or aesthetically significant" and recommended for preservation. The two-minute film was the first to record a ferryboat docking at Ellis Island, with dozens of passengers disembarking.

== Biography ==
A New York City native, Abadie began as camera assistant to James H. White at Edison Studios around 1898. In 1903, Edison sent Abadie to Europe, the Middle East and North Africa to make actuality films. This is thought to possibly have been an attempt to keep up with similar subjects popularized by the Lumières. Abadie returned to the United States and kept making similar films for Edison through at least 1904. After leaving Edison, Abadie continued to work as a freelance filmmaker and photographer. He made educational and industrial films, including Birth (1917), which is the first film of the birth of a baby.

== Selected filmography ==
=== As a cinematographer ===
- Railroad Smashup (1904)
- Annual Baby Parade, 1904, Asbury Park, N.J. (1904)
- Emigrants Landing at Ellis Island (1903)
- Move On (1903)
- Market Scene in Cairo, Egypt (1903)

=== As a director ===
- Annual Baby Parade, 1904, Asbury Park, N.J. (1904)
- Move On (1903)

=== As a writer ===
- Birth (1917)

=== As a producer ===
- Turning the Tables (1903)

=== As an actor ===
- The Great Train Robbery (1903)
- What Happened on Twenty-third Street, New York City (1901)

== See also ==
- Actuality films
