= Skidoo, California =

Skidoo
- Unincorporated community
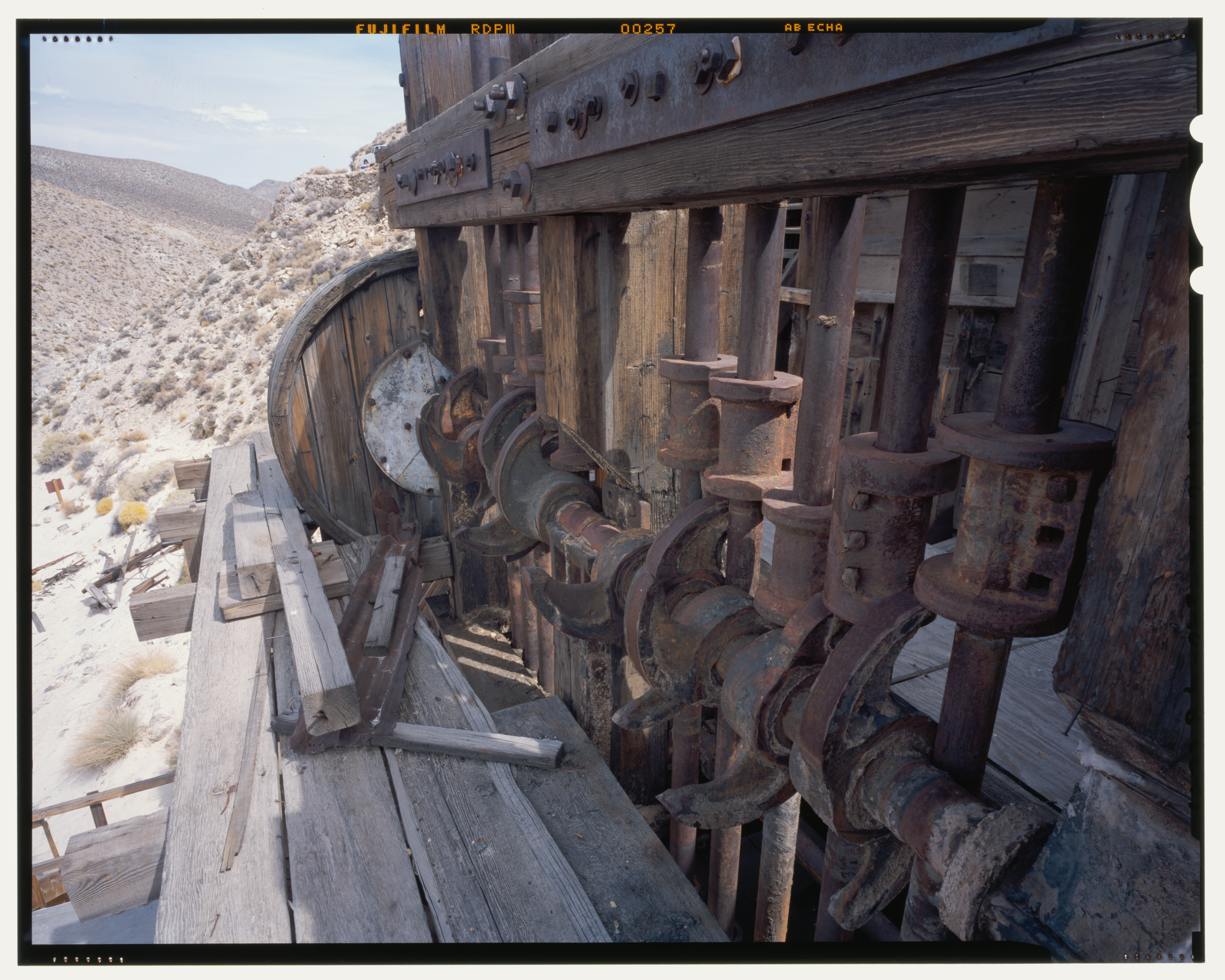
- Stamp batteries at Skidoo Mill
- Nickname: 23 Skidoo
- Location in California
- Coordinates: 36°26′08″N 117°08′51″W
- Country: United States
- State: California
- County: Inyo County
- Elevation: 5,689 ft (1,734 m)
- Skidoo
- U.S. National Register of Historic Places
- U.S. Historic district
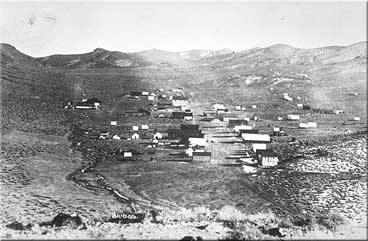
- Skidoo in 1906

- Location within California Location within the United States
- Location: Death Valley National Park, Wildrose District, California
- Area: 4,160 acres (1,680 ha)
- Built: 1906
- NRHP reference No.: 74000349
- Added to NRHP: April 16, 1974

Skidoo (formerly, Hoveck) was an unincorporated community in Inyo County, California. The geographical location of the old town site lies at an elevation of 5,689 feet (1734 m). Skidoo is a ghost town located in Death Valley National Park. It is on the National Register of Historic Places.

== History ==
Skidoo is representative of the boom towns that flourished in Death Valley during the early 20th century. The town's livelihood depended primarily on the output of the Skidoo Mine, a venture operating between 1906 and 1917. During those years the mine produced about 75,000 ounces of gold, worth at the time more than $1.5 million. Two unique items are associated with Skidoo's mining heyday. First the town possessed the only milling plant in the desert operated almost completely by water power. Second, the construction of the water pipeline was a phenomenal engineering feat; its scar can still be seen between its origin near Telescope Peak and the mill site.

The fifteen-stamp amalgamation and cyanide mill built by the Skidoo Mines Company is a rare surviving example of an early 20th-century gravity-feed system for separating gold from its ore.

=== Names ===
The name Skidoo comes from the expression 23 skidoo, a slang expression of the time, for which various origins have been suggested.

The Hoveck post office opened in 1906, changed its name to Skidoo in 1907, and closed in 1917. The name Hoveck honored Matt Hoveck, manager of the Skidoo Mine.

== See also ==
- List of ghost towns in California
