= The Wall (1962 film) =

1962 American propaganda film

- Directed by: Walter de Hoog
- Written by: Walter de Hoog
- Narrated by: Alexander Scourby
- Production companies: Hearst Metrotone News; U.S. Information Agency (USIA)
- Distributed by: National Archives and Records Administration; National Film Preservation Foundation
- Release date: 1962
- Running time: 9 minutes
- Country: United States
- Language: English

The Wall is a 1962 American propaganda film about the erection of the Berlin Wall directed by Walter de Hoog.

== Plot ==
The documentary begins with a group of German children playing football in a street bordering the Berlin Wall. In the course of the game, the ball is kicked over to the other side.

Using raw footage, the film chronicles the erection of the wall, civilian efforts to communicate with and assist East German escapees, and efforts by GDR border guards to thwart them. Shot in the first year after the wall was built, the film was narrated by Alexander Scourby, speaking for a citizen of West Berlin whose mother and children were stranded on the east side of the wall. The man is shown communicating with his children through hand signals; a risky endeavor, as East German civilians who were caught waving or otherwise communicating with people on the western side of the wall risked being forcibly relocated.

For a brief time after the wall was built, civilians were able to escape by jumping from the westward windows of buildings close to the wall. Several such escapes were captured in the film, including one where communist policemen tried to pull a woman back into the room before she fell to the waiting firefighters below. GDR guards are filmed throwing tear gas at civilians on the western side of the wall, who threw the grenades back.

After a short time, the windows of those buildings were bricked up, and barbed wire was strung on the rooftops. Trees and houses are shown being razed, lest they be used as escape routes. In the surrounding countryside, more civilians escape, despite the deployment of minefields and barbed wire. Another escapee is seen being injured in the face when she runs into a barbed wire fence. Another incident captured in the film is the death of Peter Fechter, an 18-year-old bricklayer's apprentice, who was shot by GDR border guards while trying to scale the wall and left to bleed to death. A memorial is shown for others who died trying to escape to West Germany. Three minutes of silence are held on the western side to commemorate those lost and killed, and the film ends with a young boy walking alongside the wall.

== Political censorship ==
The short documentary was preserved by the U.S. National Archives and Records Administration as part of its US Information Agency holdings. Since the film was deemed a propaganda film, the media production could not, by law, be publicly screened released or shown in the United States until after the Cold War between the Eastern Bloc and Western Bloc countries. It was, however, a favorite documentary of Robert F. Kennedy, Attorney General and brother of then president John F. Kennedy, who showed it surreptitiously to visiting Soviet artists.

== Reception ==
The National Film Preservation Foundation wrote that "Like the best USIA films, The Wall distills political events into an emotionally clear and compelling ideological story."
