= The Artist's Dilemma =

- Production company: Edison Studios
- Release date: December 14, 1901
- Running time: 2 minutes
- Country: United States
- Languages: Silent film English intertitles

The Artist's Dilemma is a 1901 American silent fantasy trick film. The short was filmed in New York City and runs two minutes.

== Plot ==
An artist falls asleep. In his dream, a beautiful woman comes out of a grandfather clock, and poses for him to paint. As he's starting to rough out the painting, a demon clown emerges from the clock to cause mischief. Objecting to the artist's methods, the demon uses a single brush to "unpaint" the picture. When the painting is complete, it turns into another woman in an identical dress. The two young women dance, and then kick both the demon and the artist in the face. They merge into a single woman, and then the demon merges with her as well. Left alone with the woman, the artist tries to embrace her, but she turns into the demon and knocks him down. The demon returns to the clock, and the artist to his dream.
