= Larry Gottheim =

American avant-garde filmmaker (born 1936)

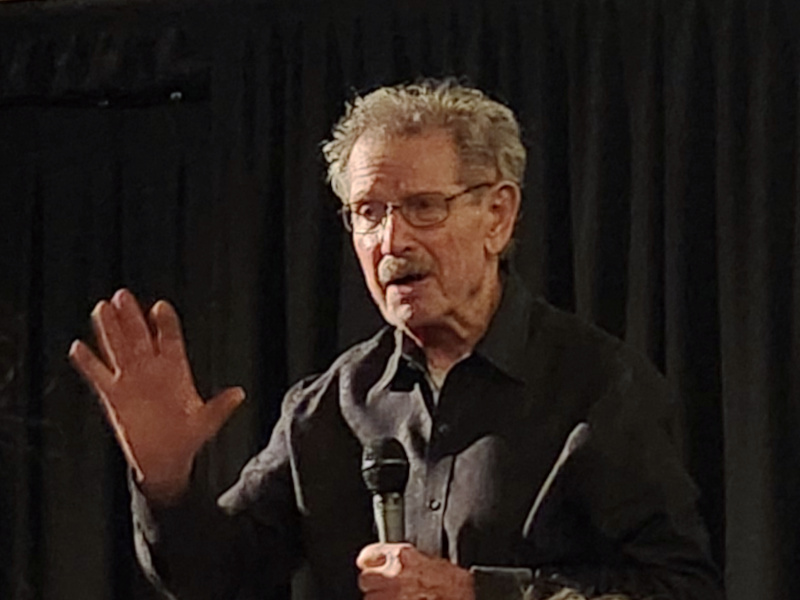
- Larry Gottheim in 2025
- Born: 1936 (age 89–90); New York City, New York
- Occupation: Filmmaker
- Years active: 1970–Present
- Notable work: Fog Line, Elective Affinities

Larry Gottheim (born 1936) is an American avant-garde filmmaker.

== Early life ==
Gottheim attended a high school for music and the arts.

He went to Oberlin College for undergraduate studies, where he became interested in poetry and fiction. He earned a Ph.D. in comparative literature at Yale University.

== Career ==
Gottheim became a faculty member at Binghamton University, where he began teaching literature. He purchased a Bolex camera and began learning how to make films. In 1969 Gottheim brought filmmaker Ken Jacobs to Binghamton, and they established a film department, the first in the SUNY system.

In the early 1970s, Gottheim made short films dealing with duration and landscape. Blues is a single shot of a bowl of blueberries and milk, from which spoonfuls of blueberries are occasionally removed until only milk remains. Corn shows ears of corn being shucked and transferred into a dish, next to the husks. After being boiled off screen, they are returned to the dish, and the lighting subtly changes as they cool. Fog Line is a static shot of a foggy landscape, where figures not discernible at the beginning become perceptible as the fog slowly lifts. Doorway is a slow pan across a snow-covered field. In Barn Rushes, Gottheim recorded several shots of a wooden barn with a camera that moved around its exterior. He likened the technique to a musical composition with multiple variations of a passage or theme. Harmonica is a sound film made in the back of a moving vehicle, where a man improvises a harmonica performance by playing it with his mouth and holding it the window.

Gottheim's Elective Affinities series, named after the novel by Johann Wolfgang von Goethe, is a collection of four films: Horizons, Mouches Volantes, Four Shadows, and Tree of Knowledge. Horizons (1973), his first feature-length film, comprises a series of landscapes, each containing a horizon. Inspired by Virgil's Georgics, Dante, and Antonio Vivaldi's The Four Seasons, Gottheim organized the film around the four seasons and developed editing patterns that act as distinct rhyme schemes for each season. Mouches Volantes (1976) uses a palindromic structure, with seven segments shown once before being repeated in reverse order. Its soundtrack is composed of excerpts from an interview with Angeline Johnson in which she discusses her life with Blind Willie. In Four Shadows (1978), he worked with structures of repetition to enact different relationships between image and sound. Tree of Knowledge (1981) moves between three types of footage: a tree recorded with prominent camera movements, found footage from an educational film, and interviews with psychiatric patients.

Gottheim was awarded a Guggenheim Fellowship in 2023.

== Filmography ==
- Blues (1970)
- Fog Line (1970)
- Corn (1970)
- Doorway (1971)
- Thought (1971)
- Harmonica (1971)
- Barn Rushes (1971)
- Horizons (1973)
- Mouches Volantes (1976)
- Four Shadows (1978)
- Tree of Knowledge (1981)
- Natural Selection (1984)
- Sorry / Hear Us (1986)
- Mnemosyne Mother of Muses (1987)
- The Red Thread (1987)
- Machette Gillette... Mama (1989)
- Your Television Traveler (1991)
- Chants and Dances for Hand (2016)
- Knot/Not (2019)
- Entanglement (2022)
- A Private Room (2024)
- Out of the Fog (2026)
