= Dog Factory =

1904 film by Edwin S. Porter

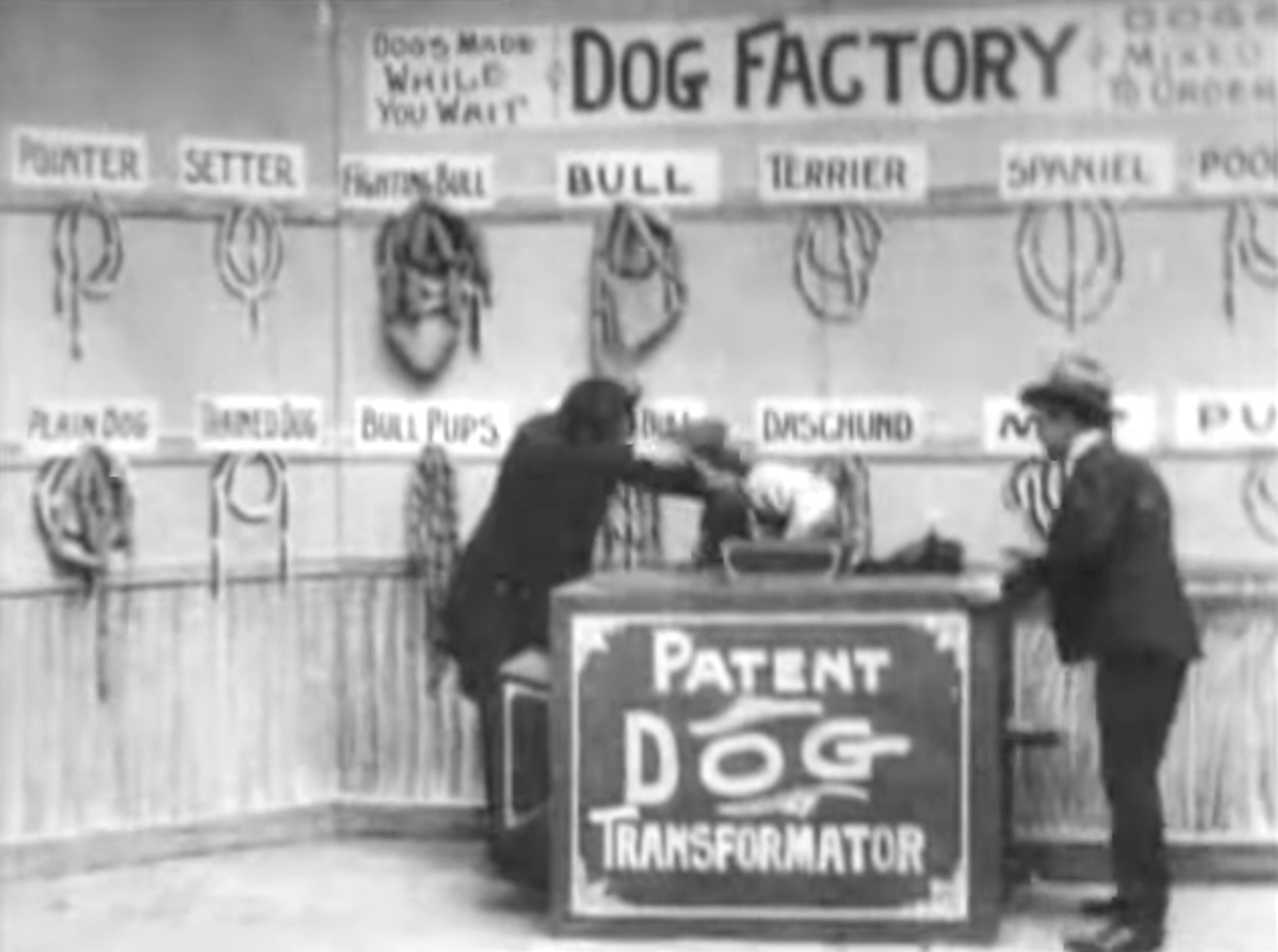
- Directed by: Edwin S. Porter
- Distributed by: Edison Manufacturing Company
- Release date: April 21, 1904
- Running time: 4:30
- Country: United States
- Language: Silent/English

Dog Factory is a 1904 silent comic trick film directed by Edwin S. Porter for the Edison Manufacturing Company. The four-and-a-half minute film offers a comic twist on a popular idea from film and vaudeville. The film concerns two inventors who run a "Dog Factory", in which strings of sausages can be fed into a machine, and turned into live dogs. The film has been described as an early example of science-fiction.

== Plot ==
Dog Factory (1904)

Two men work in a "Dog Factory", with the advertising slogan "Dogs Made While You Wait". The room is hung with racks of sausages, each labeled with the breed of a dog: Pointer, Setter, Spaniel, Poodle. A couple have more whimsical labels: "Plain Dog" and "Trained Dog". In the center of the room is a bulky machine labeled "PATENT DOG TRANSFORMATOR", with a slot at the top and a flap on each side.

A customer enters with three dogs on leashes. One by one, the dogs are inserted into the machine through the slot at the top. One man turns a crank on the machine, and the other man pulls a string of sausages out of the right side of the machine. The three strings of sausages are hung on hooks labeled "Plain Dog", "Trained Dog", and Boston Bull. The customer thanks them and leaves.

The next customer enters and asks for a spaniel. The proprietors take a string of sausages from the "Spaniel" hook, insert it into the machine, turn the crank, and remove a spaniel on a leash from the left side of the machine. The customer thanks them, and leaves with his new dog.

A woman enters and asks for a new dog. The men create a dachsund for her, but he barks too much and the woman says they should take it back. They patiently turn the dachsund into sausages again, and produce a terrier for her instead. The woman is delighted, and leaves with her dog. As the short continues, the proprietors create a trained dog, and a trio of bull pups.

Then a rough-looking customer enters, and asks for a Boston bull — but when the men create a bull for him, the customer brusquely says that's not what he wants, and threatens to punch them. Concerned, the proprietors take a string of sausages from a hook marked "Fighting Bull", and a large dog emerges from the machine and attacks the customer. The tough customer runs away, and the proprietors are pleased to see him go.

== Production ==
La Charcuterie mécanique (1896), a film by Auguste and Louis Lumière which served as the inspiration for several similar films

The film is part of a string of "sausage-making" films, which began in 1895-96 with the Lumière Brothers' La Charcuterie mécanique (The Mechanical Butcher). In that film, a live pig is led into a machine, which turns them into sausages coming out the other end. This inspired other films, including George Albert Smith's Making Sausages (1897), Biograph Studios' The Sausage Machine (1897), and Porter's own Fun in a Butcher Shop (1901). The twist introduced by Dog Factory in 1904 is that the process is reversible, turning sausages back into dogs.

According to Edison's catalog, the two inventors in the film are intended to be Germans.

== Distribution ==
The 240-foot film sold 42 prints during 1904.

== See also ==
- Edwin S. Porter filmography
