= Move On (1903 film) =

- Directed by: Alfred C. Abadie
- Cinematography: Alfred C. Abadie (uncredited)
- Release date: 1903
- Running time: 1 minute (19.5 frame/s) (USA)
- Country: United States

Move On is a 1903 American film directed by Alfred C. Abadie. The film was preserved by the Library of Congress.

== Plot summary ==
Filmed in New York's Lower East Side, the scene is a street where several pushcart vendors have gathered to sell their goods. In the foreground are fruit and vegetable carts. An elevated railroad track crosses over the street in the background. As the film progresses, two policemen can be seen heading up the street toward the camera and ordering all of the vendors to move. One of the policemen approaches the camera waving his nightstick, and the cart in the foreground begins moving. The film ends with a closeup of the policeman scolding the vendor.
