= George S. Fleming =

American actor

George S. Fleming was an English born actor, director, and scenic designer whose short films were influential early projects in the medium.

== Life and career ==
George Stephen Fleming was born in London on or about 12th November 1844, first son of George and Mary Anne Fleming, servants at Buckingham Palace. When George Stephen was 4 years old, his father was promoted and the family relocated to Adelaide Cottage in Windsor's Home Park, where young George grew up. His childhood playmates were often Queen Victoria's children when they frequently visited the Cottage, one being Prince Arthur, who at one point was Canada's 10th Governor General. When George Stephen was in his early twenties he got to know the Castle Photographer, William Bambridge and in 1866 married Bambridge's niece Hannah Matilda Bambridge, daughter of Windsor's Head Postmaster. Jobs as Publican at the Kings Arms, Bagshot, Surrey, and Coal Agent in Maidenhead, Berkshire followed, during which time four children were born, two of whom survived infancy, the last being Mary Ann Louise in September 1877. Some time thereafter George Stephen left home and travelled to the US, probably via Canada. In 1880 he entered the US and found work as an actor and artist in Manhattan, New York. Hannah died in 1885 and shortly after George married Ida Christabel von Wyckoff, a Swedish immigrant. A move to San Francisco, California for a few years was followed by a return to Manhattan by 1895. The Edison Manufacturing Company hired George S. Fleming in January 1901, just as its new roof-top studio on East Twenty-First Street in New York City were opening. Fleming and Edwin S. Porter were frequent collaborators. Fleming left the Edison production team in 1903. George continued to live and work as a freelance artist in Manhattan for a few years but eventually his marriage failed and he moved to Toronto where he worked at the Canadian National Exhibition. In 1911 Prince Arthur, Duke of Connaught and Governor of Canada and his wife visited Toronto where according to her diary for 28th November they met "George Fleming's eldest son". George S Fleming died of pneumonia in Toronto's General Hospital on 11 May 1917 and lies in the city's Prospect Cemetery. He was survived by two English daughters Emma (Elsie) and Mary Ann, plus three American sons, Alfred, Lovell, and Herbert. Mary Ann nursed a wounded Canadian soldier in London during World War 1 and married him in Toronto on 6th September 1919.

== Selected filmography ==
- Execution of Czolgosz with Panorama of Auburn Prison: Production Assistant (uncredited), 1901
- Ice-Boat Racing at Red Bank, N. J.:
- Kansas Saloon Smashers (also titled Mrs. Carrie Nation and Her Hatchet Brigade): Director, 1901
- The Old Maid Having Her Picture Taken: Director, 1901
- President McKinley and Escort Going to the Capitol:
- Trapeze Disrobing Act: Director, 1901
- What Happened on Twenty-third Street, New York City: Director (uncredited), 1901
- Why Mr. Nation Wants a Divorce: Director, 1901
- The Burlesque Suicide, No. 2: Director, 1902
- The Interrupted Bathers: Director, 1902
- Jack and the Beanstalk: Director, Set Designer, 1902
- Life of an American Fireman: Director, 1903
