= What Happened on Twenty-third Street, New York City =

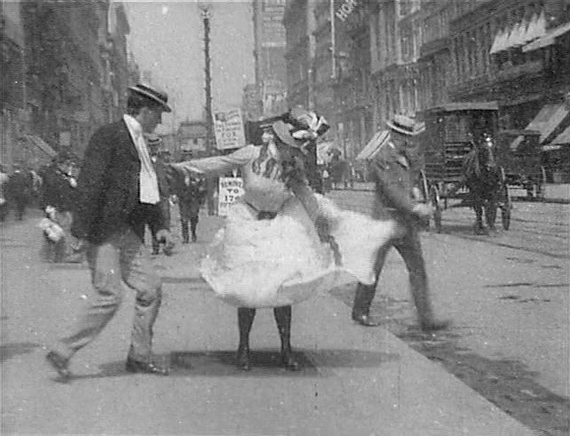
- A screenshot from the film
- Directed by: George S. Fleming; Edwin S. Porter
- Starring: A. C. Abadie; Florence Georgie
- Cinematography: Edwin S. Porter
- Release date: August 1901
- Running time: 77 seconds
- Country: United States

What Happened on Twenty-third Street

What Happened on Twenty-third Street, New York City is a 1901 American short film starring A. C. Abadie and Florence Georgie in which a woman's undergarments are accidentally exposed. A similar 1901 film, Soubrette's Troubles on a Fifth Avenue Stage, also starred Abadie and Georgie.

== Plot ==
The 77-second film depicts a woman, escorted by a man, walking over a grate. The hot air lifts her skirt, she laughs and they walk on.

== Comparisons ==
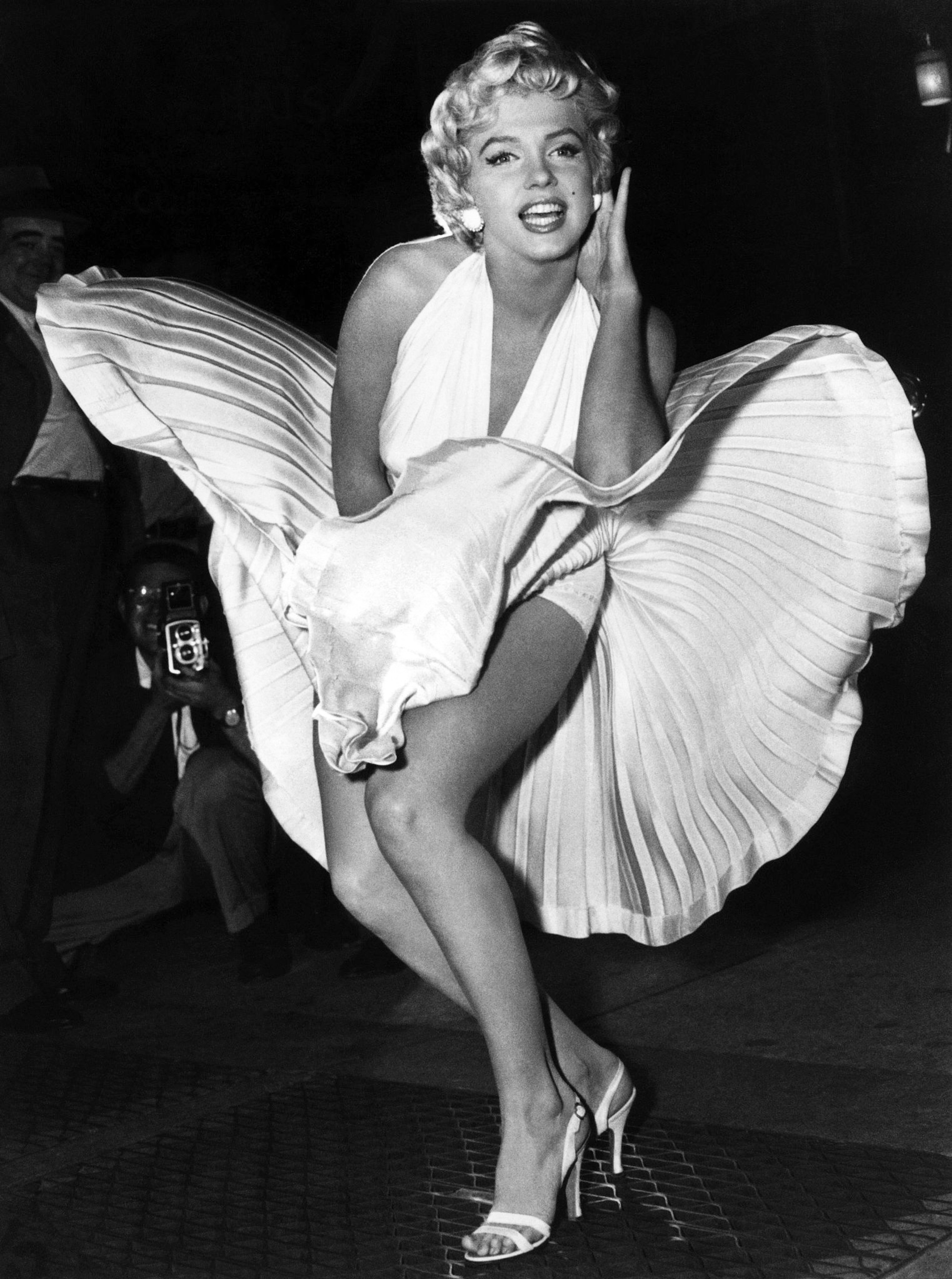
The film has been compared to the iconic image of Marilyn Monroe in a white dress from The Seven Year Itch (1955). Here Monroe poses for photographers in September 1954 during filming.

In 2001, Rosemary Hanes and Brian Taves compared the sequence to the iconic image of Marilyn Monroe in a white dress in the 1955 film The Seven Year Itch, writing "With The Seven Year Itch (1955), the image of Marilyn Monroe's thighs exposed under her billowing skirt entered American popular culture. The Library's motion picture and broadcasting collections provide the opportunity to document not only how women's roles and their depictions have changed throughout the past hundred years, but also how much has remained the same."

Tom Gunning contrasts the two events as narrative devices, writing, "The act of display [in What Happened...] is both climax and resolution here and does not lead to a series of incidents or the creation of characters with discernible traits. While the similar lifting of Marilyn Monroe's skirt in The Seven Year Itch also provides a moment of spectacle, it simultaneously creates character traits that explain later narrative actions."

== See also ==
- Edwin S. Porter filmography
