= Why Mr. Nation Wants a Divorce =

1901 film by Edwin S. Porter

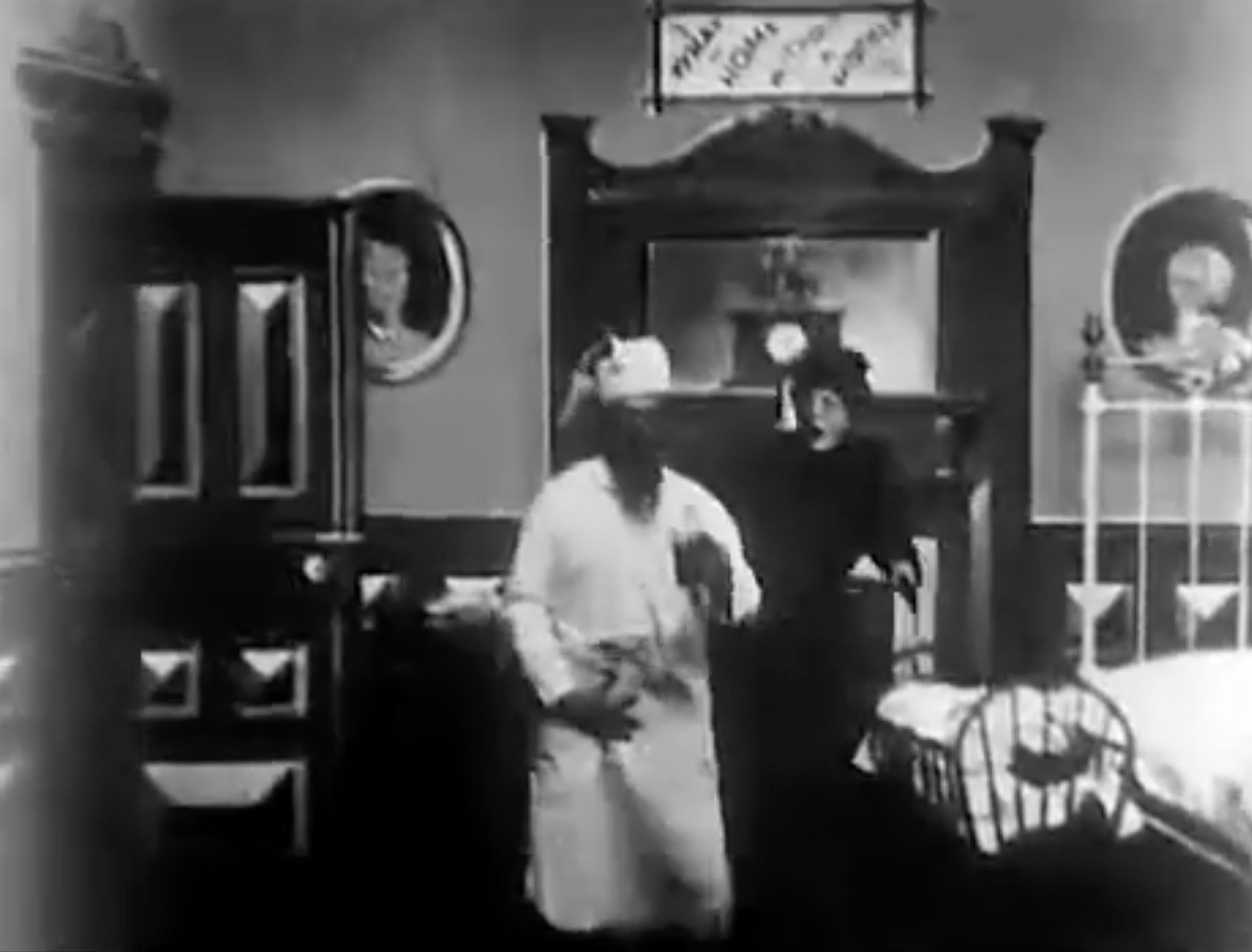
- Directed by: Edwin S. Porter and George S. Fleming
- Distributed by: Edison Manufacturing Company
- Release date: March 1, 1901
- Running time: 1 minute 46 seconds
- Country: United States
- Language: English

Why Mr. Nation Wants a Divorce is a 1901 silent short comedy film directed by Edwin S. Porter and George S. Fleming. It is a satire on the activities of radical temperance advocate Carrie Nation, who was known for her crusade against bars and taverns. Earlier in 1901, Porter directed another film mocking Nation, Kansas Saloon Smashers; this follow-up film was inspired by news reports that Nation's husband demanded a divorce.

== Plot ==
Mr. Nation is seen at home, dressed in a nightshirt and cap, taking care of two children in a bedroom. A sign over the mantelpiece reads "What is Home Without a Mother". In the crib, an infant is crying, and Mr. Nation tries to comfort the baby, picking it up and pacing around the room to quiet the child. The older child gets out of bed, and the man scolds the child, administering a couple of quick spanks on the bottom before bundling the kid back into bed.

Overwrought, Mr. Nation picks up a newspaper, and is outraged to read about his wife's political activities. He crumples up the paper and throws it into the fireplace. He gives the crying baby a bottle, and then, seeking his own liquid refreshment, he reaches under his pillow to retrieve a bottle of whiskey for himself.

A severe Mrs. Nation enters the room, catching her husband taking a swig of whiskey. Outraged, she smacks him, and then pulls him over her knee to administer a humiliating spanking.

== Production ==
Critics surmise that Mrs. Nation was played by a male actor.

== Reception ==
In Sex Seen: The Emergence of Modern Sexuality in America, Sharon R. Ullman wrote that "this satire attacked on several fronts at once, assaulting not only famed temperance reformer Carrie Nation but also Prohibition as a cause, women who deserted their children for social housekeeping activities, and men who permitted themselves to be 'infantilized' by their wives' behavior." Kay Sloan in The Loud Silents agrees that the film's message was that "the temperance workers defied the 'proper' place for women, bullying their weaker husbands and ignoring their children in their crusade to save the American family."

== See also ==
- Edwin S. Porter filmography
