= List of avant-garde films of the 1970s =

This is a list of avant-garde and experimental films released in the 1970s.

Title	Director	Cast	Nation	Notes
1970
The American Soldier	Rainer Werner Fassbinder	Karl Scheydt, Elga Sorbas, Jan George	West Germany	
The Animals of Eden and After	Stan Brakhage		United States	
Berlin Horse	Malcolm Le Grice		United Kingdom	Soundtrack by Brian Eno
Diminished Frame	Robert Beavers		United States	24 mins, B&W and Color
L'Eden et après	Alain Robbe-Grillet	Catherine Jourdan, Richard Leduc, Lorraine Rainer, Pierre Zimmer	France; Czechoslovakia	
Even Dwarfs Started Small	Werner Herzog	Helmut Döring	West Germany	
Fog Line	Larry Gottheim		United States	
Gods of the Plague	Rainer Werner Fassbinder	Hanna Schygulla, Margarethe von Trotta, Harry Baer	West Germany	
I Don't Know	Penelope Spheeris		United States	
It is Not the Homosexual Who is Perverse, But the Society in Which He Lives	Rosa von Praunheim		West Germany	
The Machine of Eden	Stan Brakhage		United States	
Out 1	Jacques Rivette	Hermine Karagheuz, Michèle Moretti, Karen Puig	France	TV series
Palinode	Robert Beavers		United States	21 mins, Color
Performance	Donald Cammell, Nicolas Roeg	James Fox, Mick Jagger, Anita Pallenberg	United Kingdom	
Remedial Reading Comprehension	Owen Land		United States	
Scenes from Under Childhood, Section Four	Stan Brakhage		United States	Part of Scenes from Under Childhood cycle
Serene Velocity	Ernie Gehr		United States	
Sexual Meditation No. 1: Motel	Stan Brakhage		United States	Part of Sexual Meditations cycle
The Song of Moscow	Jonas Mekas		United States	Travel Song series
Thomas Bernhard: Three Days	Ferry Radax	Thomas Bernhard	Austria	
El Topo	Alejandro Jodorowsky	Alejandro Jodorowsky, Brontis Jodorowsky, Maria Lorenzio, David Silva	Mexico	
Trash	Paul Morrissey	Joe Dallesandro, Jane Forth, Holly Woodlawn	United States	
Unfolding	Coni Beeson		United States	
Valerie and Her Week of Wonders	Jaromil Jireš	Helena Anýžová, Karel Engel, Jaroslava Schallerová,	Czechoslovakia	
Vladimir et Rosa	Jean-Luc Godard, Jean-Pierre Gorin	Jean-Luc Godard, Jean-Pierre Gorin, Anne Wiazemsky	France	
The Weir-Falcon Saga	Stan Brakhage		United States	
Zorns Lemma	Hollis Frampton		United States	
1971
The Act of Seeing with One's Own Eyes	Stan Brakhage		United States	Part of the "Pittsburgh Trilogy"
Angels'	Stan Brakhage		United States	
Beware of a Holy Whore	Rainer Werner Fassbinder	Lou Castel, Eddie Constantine, Hanna Schygulla	West Germany	
Carriage Trade	Warren Sonbert		United States	
Critical Mass	Hollis Frampton	Barbara DiBenedetto, Frank Albetta	United States	Part of Hapax Legomena cycle
Deus Ex	Stan Brakhage		United States	Part of the "Pittsburgh Trilogy"
DIrty	Stephen Dwoskin		United Kingdom	
Door	Stan Brakhage		United States	
Dresden Dynamo	Lis Rhodes		United Kingdom	
Eyes	Stan Brakhage		United States	Part of the "Pittsburgh Trilogy"
Football as Never Before	Helmuth Costand	George Best	United Kingdom; West Germany	
Fox Fire Child Watch	Stan Brakhage		United States	
Hand Grenade	Gill Eatherley		United Kingdom	Soundtrack by Neu!
I'm Too Sad to Tell You	Bas Jan Ader		United States	
A Journey to Avebury	Derek Jarman		United Kingdom	
Meditation	Jordan Belson		United States	Abstract, color
N. a pris les dés (N. Took the Dice)	Alain Robbe-Grillet	Catherine Jourdan, Richard Leduc, Pierre Zimmer	France	
(nostalgia)	Hollis Frampton	Michael Snow	United States	Part of Hapax Legomena cycle
The Peaceable Kingdom	Stan Brakhage		United States	
Poem	B. S. Johnson	William Hoyland	United Kingdom	
Punishment Park	Peter Watkins	Paul Alelyanes, Carmen Argenziano, Stan Armsted, Harold Beaulieu, Jim Bohan	United States	
La Région Centrale	Michael Snow		Canada	
Sexual Meditation: Room with View	Stan Brakhage		United States	Part of Sexual Meditations cycle
Still	Ernie Gehr		United States	
Still Light	Robert Beavers		United States	25 mins, Color
Travelling Matte	Hollis Frampton		United States	Part of Hapax Legomena cycle
The Trip to Door	Stan Brakhage		United States	
Throw Away Your Books, Rally in the Streets	Shuji Terayama		Japan	
Viva la Muerte	Fernando Arrabal	Mahdi Chaouch, Núria Espert, Anouk Ferjac	France; Tunisia	
Western History	Stan Brakhage		United States	
W.R.: Mysteries of the Organism	Dušan Makavejev	Milena Dravić, Jagoda Kaloper, Ivica Vidović	Yugoslavia	
1972
Chakra	Jordan Belson		United States	Abstract, color
La Cicatrice Interieure	Philippe Garrel	Nico, Pierre Clémenti, Philippe Garrel	France	
Clocktime Trailer	Stuart Pound		United Kingdom	
The Death of Maria Malibran	Werner Schroeter	Ingrid Caven, Candy Darling, Christine Kaufman, Magdalena Montezuma	West Germany	
The Discreet Charm of the Bourgeoisie	Luis Buñuel	Fernando Rey, Delphine Seyrig, Stéphane Audran	France; Italy; Spain	
Dreamwood	James Broughton		United States	
Dyn Amo	Stephen Dwoskin		United Kingdom	
Ecstasy of the Angels	Kōji Wakamatsu	Michio Akiyama, Masao Adachi, Rie Yokoyama	Japan	
Eye Myth Educational	Stan Brakhage		United States	
From the Notebook of...	Robert Beavers		United States	48 mins, Color
Garden of Luxor	Derek Jarman		United Kingdom	
Hats Off to Hollywood	Penelope Spheeris		United States	
Hotel Monterrey	Chantal Akerman		Belgium	
Letter to Jane	Jean-Luc Godard, Jean-Pierre Gorin		France	
Ordinary Matter	Hollis Frampton		United States	Part of Hapax Legomena cycle
The Painting	Robert Beavers		United States	12 mins, Color
Poetic Justice	Hollis Frampton		United States	Part of Hapax Legomena cycle
Portraits	Barbara Meter		Netherlands	
The Presence	Stan Brakhage		United States	
The Process	Stan Brakhage		United States	
Red Psalm	Miklós Jancsó	Lajos Balázsovits, Bertalan Solti, Janos Koltai	Hungary	
Reminiscences of a Journey to Lithuania	Jonas Mekas		Soviet Union; United States	
Remote Control	Hollis Frampton		United States	Part of Hapax Legomena cycle
Requiem für einen Jungraulichen Koenig	Hans-Jürgen Syberberg	Peter Kern	West Germany	
The Riddle of Lumen	Stan Brakhage		United States	
Sexual Meditation: Faun's Room, Yale	Stan Brakhage		United States	Part of Sexual Meditations cycle
Sexual Meditation: Hotel	Stan Brakhage		United States	Part of Sexual Meditations cycle
Sexual Meditation: Office Suite	Stan Brakhage		United States	Part of Sexual Meditations cycle
Sexual Meditation: Open Field	Stan Brakhage		United States	Part of Sexual Meditations cycle
The Shores of Phos: A Fable	Stan Brakhage		United States	
Special Effects	Hollis Frampton		United States	Part of Hapax Legomena cycle
Threshold	Malcolm Le Grice		United Kingdom	
The Wold Shadow	Stan Brakhage		United States	
1973
Can Dialectics Break Bricks?	René Viénet		France	
The Embassy	Chris Marker		France	
F for Fake	Orson Welles	Orson Welles, Oja Kodar, Joseph Cotten	France; Iran	
Fat Man on a Beach	Michael Bakewell	B. S. Johnson	United Kingdom	TV film
Ganja & Hess	Bill Gunn	Duane Jones, Marlene Clark, Leonard Jackson	United States	
Gift	Stan Brakhage		United States	
H is for House	Peter Greenaway		United Kingdom	
The Holy Mountain	Alejandro Jodorowsky	Alejandro Jodorowsky, Richard Rutowski, Jose Flores	Mexico; United States	
I Will Walk Like a Crazy Horse	Fernando Arrabal	Emmanuelle Riva, George Shannon	France	
Iluminacja	Krzysztof Zanussi	Edward Zebrowski, Marcin Latallo, Włodzimierz Zonn	Poland	
Immoral Tales	Walerian Borowczyk	Lise Danvers, Paloma Picasso, Charlotte Alexandra	France; Hungary; Italy	
Mann & Frau & Animal	Valie Export		Austria	
Occasional Work of a Female Slave	Alexander Kluge	Alexandra Kluge	West Germany	
Reel Time	Annabel Nicolson		United Kingdom	Expanded cinema
... Remote ... Remote	Valie Export		Austria	
The Second Coming of Suzanne	Michael Barry	Sondra Locke, Jared Martin, Paul Sand, Gene Barry	United States	
Sincerity I	Stan Brakhage		United States	Part of Sincerity cycle
The Society of the Spectacle	Guy Debord		France	
Stolen Apples for Karen Blixen	Derek Jarman		United Kingdom	
Television Delivers People	Richard Serra		United States	
Themroc	Claude Faraldo	Michel Piccoli, Béatrice Romand, Jeanne Herviale	France; Italy	
Work Done	Robert Beavers		United States	22 mins, Color
World on a Wire	Rainer Werner Fassbinder	Klaus Löwitsch, Barbara Valentin	West Germany	
Year of the Woman	Sandra Hochman		United States	
1974
Aquarien	Stan Brakhage		United States	
Céline and Julie Go Boating	Jacques Rivette	Juliet Berto, Dominique Labourier, Bulle Ogier	France	
Clancy	Stan Brakhage		United States	
Dominion	Stan Brakhage		United States	
Dyketactics	Barbara Hammer		United States	
Edvard Munch	Peter Watkins	Gro Frås, Geir Westby	Norway; Sweden	
Les Filles de Kamare	René Viénet		France	
Flight	Stan Brakhage		United States	
He Was Born, He Suffered, He Died	Stan Brakhage		United States	
Hymn to Her	Stan Brakhage		United States	
The Phantom of Liberty	Luis Buñuel	Jean-Claude Brialy, Monica Vitti, Paul Frankeur	France; Italy	
Ruskin	Robert Beavers		United States	45 mins, Color and B&W
Skein	Stan Brakhage		United States	
Sol	Stan Brakhage		United States	
Space Is the Place	John Coney	Sun Ra, Erika Leder, Barbara Deloney	United States	
Star Garden	Stan Brakhage		United States	
The Stars Are Beautiful	Stan Brakhage	Jane Brakhage, Stan Brakhage, Myrrena Brakhage	United States	
Suite (212)	Nam June Paik		United States	
Sweet Movie	Dušan Makavejev	Carole Laure, John Vernon, Anna Prucnal	France	
The Text of Light	Stan Brakhage		United States	
They Do Not Exist	Mustafa Abu Ali		Palestine	
Vase de Noces	Thierry Zéno	Dominique Garny	Belgium	
The Wait	Uzi Peres		Israel	
1975
Bataille de Waterloo	Marcel Broodthaers		Belgium	
Black Moon	Louis Malle	Cathryn Harrison, Therese Giehse, Alexandra Stewart	France	
Circling	Peter Donebauer		United Kingdom	
Condition of Illusion	Peter Gidal		United Kingdom	
Evrydiki BA 2O37	Nikos Nikolaidis	Vera Tschechowa, John Moore, Niki Triantafillidi	Greece; West Germany	
India Song	Marguerite Duras		France	
Jeanne Dielman, 23 quai du Commerce, 1080 Bruxelles	Chantal Akerman	Delphine Seyrig, Jan Decorte, Jacques Doniol-Valcroze	Belgium; France	
Light Music	Lis Rhodes		United Kingdom	
The Mirror	Andrei Tarkovsky	Margarita Terekhova, Anatoly Solonitsyn, Nikolai Grinko	Soviet Union	
Nightcleaners, Part 1	Berwick Street Collective		United Kingdom	
Number Two	Jean-Luc Godard	Sandrine Battistella, Pierre Oudrey	France	
Refutation of All the Judgements on Guy Debord's Film 'The Society of the Spectacle'	Guy Debord		France	Situationist film
Semiotics of the Kitchen	Martha Rosler		United States	
Short Films 1975	Stan Brakhage		United States	
Sincerity II	Stan Brakhage		United States	Part of Sincerity cycle
The Tree of Guernica	Fernando Arrabal	Cosimo Cinieri, Ron Faber, Mariangela Melato	France; Italy	
Untitled No. 9	Stan Brakhage		United States	
Untitled No. 10	Stan Brakhage		United States	
1976
A Malgam A	Iván Zulueta		Spain	
Absence	Stan Brakhage		United States	Silent.
Airs	Stan Brakhage		United States	
Comment ça va?	Jean-Luc Godard, Anne-Marie Miéville	Anne-Marie Miéville	France	
Crossroads	Bruce Conner		United States	
Desert	Stan Brakhage		United States	
The Dream, NYC, The Return, The Flower	Stan Brakhage		United States	
The Girl Chewing Gum	John Smith		United Kingdom	
Heart of Glass	Werner Herzog	Clemens Scheitz, Sonja Skiba, Volker Prechtel	West Germany	
Highs	Stan Brakhage		United States	
Jonah Who Will Be 25 in the Year 2000	Alain Tanner	Jean-Luc Bideau, Myriam Boyer, Myriam Mézières	France; Switzerland	
Leo es pardo	Iván Zulueta		Spain	
Lost, Lost, Lost	Jonas Mekas	Peter Beard, Ed Emshwiller, Ken Jacobs, Adolfas Mekas, Jonas Mekas, Tiny Tim, Peter Bogdanovich, Allen Ginsberg, Barbara Rubin, Robert Frank	United States	
Migration, for Jack Nelson	Bill Viola		United States	
Rembrandt, Etc., and Jane	Stan Brakhage		United States	
Short Films 1976	Stan Brakhage		United States	
Tragoedia	Stan Brakhage		United States	
Trio	Stan Brakhage		United States	
Wienfilm 1896-1976	Ernst Schmidt Jr.		Austria	
Window	Stan Brakhage		United States	
1977
Le Camion (The Lorry)	Marguerite Duras	Gérard Depardieu, Marguerite Duras	France	
The Domain of the Moment	Stan Brakhage		United States	
Eraserhead	David Lynch	Jack Nance, Charlotte Stewart, Jeanne Bates	United States	
The Governor	Stan Brakhage		United States	
A Grin Without a Cat	Chris Marker		France	
Hitler: A Film from Germany	Hans-Jürgen Syberberg	Heinz Schubert	West Germany	
House	Nobuhiko Obayashi	Kimiko Ikegami	Japan	
I, an Actress	George Kuchar	George Kuchar, Barbara Lapsley	United States	
Music of the Spheres	Jordan Belson		United States	Abstract, color. A revised version was edited in 2002.
Reflecting Pool	Bill Viola		United States	
Riddles of the Sphinx	Laura Mulvey, Peter Wollen	Merdelle Jordine, Dinah Stabb, Riannon Tise	United Kingdom	
Sentimental Journey	Anne Rees-Mogg		United Kingdom	
Shot Dog Film	Tom Otterness		United States	
Soldiers and Other Cosmic Objects	Stan Brakhage		United States	
Thames Barrier	William Raban		United Kingdom	
Sotiors (Alone)	Robert Beavers		United States	Sotiros trilogy, 12 mins
Sotiros Responds	Robert Beavers		United States	Sotiros trilogy, 25 mins
That Obscure Object of Desire	Luis Buñuel	Carole Bouquet, Ángela Molina, Fernando Rey	France; Spain	
Unsichtbare Gegner (Invisible Adversaries)	Valie Export	Susanne Widl, Peter Weibel, Josef Plavec	Austria	
1978
Bird	Stan Brakhage		United States	
Burial Path	Stan Brakhage		United States	
Centre	Stan Brakhage		United States	
Césarée	Marguerite Duras		France	
Duplicity	Stan Brakhage		United States	Part of Duplicity cycle
Duplicity II	Stan Brakhage		United States	Part of Duplicity cycle
Forza Bastia!	Jacques Tati, Sophie Tatischeff		France	
Hand Exercises	Uzi Peres		Israel	
In Between	Jonas Mekas		United States	
Jubilee	Derek Jarman	Jenny Runacre, Jordan, Nell Campbell	United Kingdom	
Light Reading	Lis Rhodes		United Kingdom	
Nightmare Series	Stan Brakhage		United States	
Notes for Jerome	Jonas Mekas	Jerome Hill, Jonas Mekas, Taylor Mead, Bernadette Lafont, Charles Rydell, Barbara Stone, Noël Burch, Judith Malina, Julian Beck, P. Adams Sitney, Jean-Jacques Lebel, Alec Wilder	United States	
Often During the Day	Joanna Davis		United Kingdom	
Purity, and After	Stan Brakhage		United States	
Sincerity III	Stan Brakhage		United States	Part of Sincerity cycle
Sluice	Stan Brakhage		United States	
Sotiros in the Elements	Robert Beavers		United States	Sotiros trilogy, 8 mins
Thot-Fal'N	Stan Brakhage		United States	
Visions of a City	Larry Jordan		United States	
A Walk Through H: Reincarnation of an Ornithologist	Peter Greenaway		United Kingdom	
1979
@	Stan Brakhage		United States	
Allegoria	Stéphane Marti		France	
Cartoon Le Mousse	Chick Strand		United States	
The Cartoon Theatre of Dr. Gaz	Jeff Keen		United Kingdom	
Creation	Stan Brakhage		United States	
Ear to the Ground	David Van Tieghem		United States	
Eureka	Ernie Gehr		United States	
Fever Dream	Chick Strand		United States	
Orchestra Rehearsal	Federico Fellini	Balduin Baas, Elisabeth Labi, Ronaldo Bonacchi	France; Italy; West Germany	
Paradise Not Yet Lost	Jonas Mekas	Peter Kubelka, Jonas Mekas, Oona Mekas, Hermann Nitsch	United States	
Race d'Ep (The Homosexual Century)	Guy Hocquenghem, Lionel Soukaz		France	TV film
Radio/On	Chris Petit	David Beames	United Kingdom	
Roman Numeral: I	Stan Brakhage		United States	Part of Roman Numeral Series (also called the "Romans")
Roman Numeral: II	Stan Brakhage		United States	Part of Roman Numeral Series (also called the "Romans")
Roman Numeral: III	Stan Brakhage		United States	Part of Roman Numeral Series (also called the "Romans")
Sincerity IV	Stan Brakhage		United States	Part of Sincerity cycle
Stalker	Andrei Tarkovsky	Alexander Kaidanovsky, Anatoly Solonitsyn, Nikolai Grinko	Soviet Union	
Tale of Tales	Yuri Norstein		Soviet Union	
Tally Brown, New York	Rosa von Praunheim	Tally Brown	West Germany; United States	
Thriller	Sally Potter		United Kingdom	
The Wretches Are Still Singing	Nikos Nikolaidis	Alkis Panagiotidis, Konstantinos Tzoumas, Rita Bensousan	Greece	
