= Zorns Lemma =

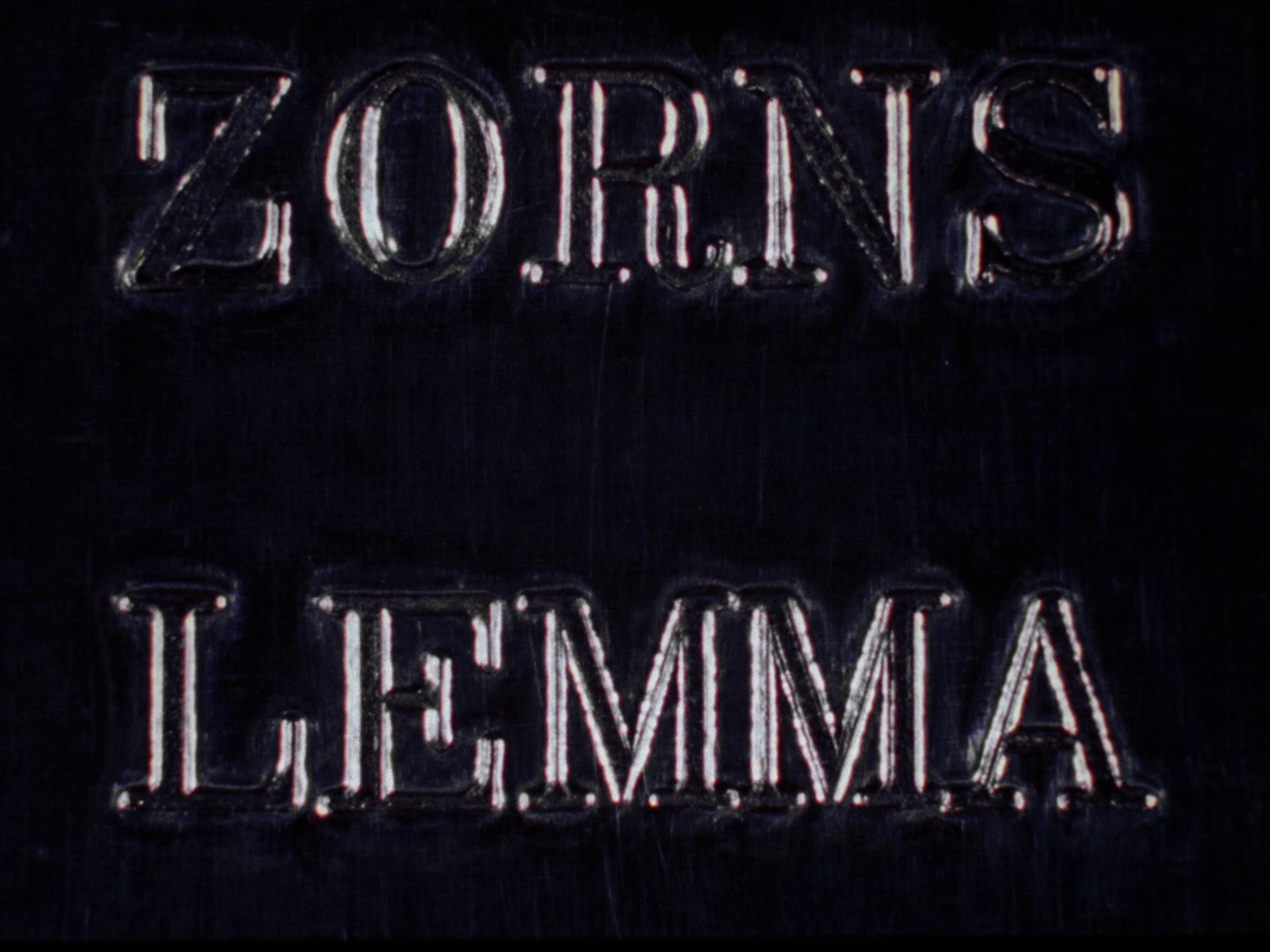
- Title screen
- Directed by: Hollis Frampton
- Starring: Joyce Wieland; Robert Huot; Marcia Steinbrecher
- Release date: 1970
- Running time: 60 minutes
- Country: United States
- Language: English

Zorns Lemma is a 1970 American structural experimental film by Hollis Frampton. Originally starting as a series of photographs, the non-narrative film is structured around a 24-letter classical Latin alphabet. It remains, along with Michael Snow's Wavelength and Tony Conrad's The Flicker, one of the best known examples of structural filmmaking.

== Content ==
The opening section of Zorns Lemma is roughly 5 minutes long. In it a woman reads an abecedary of 24 couplets from The Bay State Primer, an eighteenth century book designed to teach children the alphabet. The film is entirely black during this section.

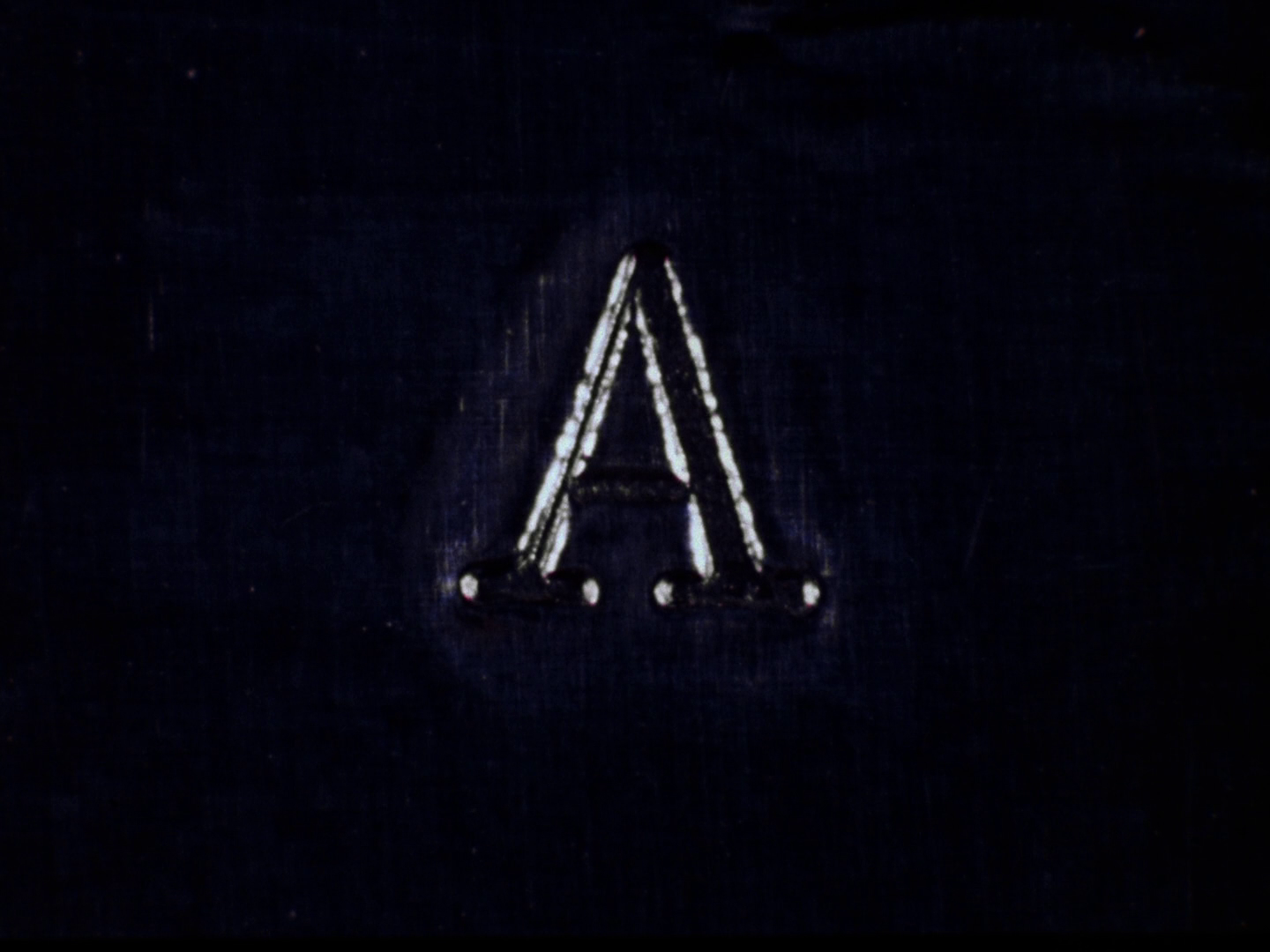
A letter A stamped on tin foil, the first of 24 such letters shown at the beginning of the second section

The film's main section is silent and lasts 45 minutes, broken into 2,700 one-second units. It shows the viewer a 24-part "alphabet" (i & j and u & v are interchanged) that slowly evolves. The section begins by presenting each letter typed on a sheet of tin foil. The alphabet is initially composed of words that appear on street signs, photographed in Manhattan. As the film continues to cycle through the alphabet, individually filmed letters are slowly substituted with abstract moving images. The first four substitutions—fire (x), waves (z), smoke (q), and reeds (y)–depict the four classical elements, and by the end, it is fully composed of moving images which represent them.

The film's conclusion lasts 11 minutes. It shows a man, woman and dog walking through snow. Six women's voices alternate in reading the words of a passage from Robert Grosseteste's medieval document On Light, or the Ingression of Forms, which Frampton translated and edited for the film. The voices read the text at a rate of one word per second. As the film ends, it fades to white.

== Production ==
Zorns Lemma emerged from Word Pictures, a photography project that Frampton made from 1962 to 1963. For Word Pictures, Frampton shot over 2000 black-and-white 35mm photographs of environmental words, seeking to explore the illusions of photography as a medium. However, he had difficulty devising a form in which to present the photographs. During this period, Frampton became less active as a photographer and first started to experiment with filmmaking. He started to make a film by shooting the photographs on a stand but thought the result looked "dead", deciding that he should film the words in color. He began filming static shots of words, carefully framing them with the use of a tripod.

Frampton thought that imposing his own order on the film would make it too similar to a poem, so he decided to use alphabetical order and avoid any conscious connections between words. Because the number of times he had captured each letter varied greatly, he decided to use the "double alphabet" and continuously cycle through the letters. This structure left "holes" to be filled in the film. Frampton decided to gradually substitute out the letters for images, originally planning to use entirely different images each time. Frampton's production notes outline three criteria for selecting the images used. He preferred banal images, with the exception of animals included for "shock value". He preferred "sculptural" images showing work or the "illusion of space or substance". These included painting a wall (k) and changing a tire (t). Frampton worked in "cinematic or para-cinematic reference", often subtly so. The letter d is substituted with cookie dough being sliced with a star-shaped cookie cutter, as a cinematic reference to film "stars". Modular actions—such as a child swinging (l) or assembling Tinkertoys (r)—serve as para-cinematic references to modular time. Frampton set the length of each shot to be one second, or 24 frames. However, 24 of the shots have slight irregularities in their lengths. Frampton instructed key grip David Hamilton that 12 shots should have 23 frames and 12 shots should have 25 frames.

The final section of Zorns Lemma was shot in 1970. Frampton envisioned it as a time for the audience "to empty the mind". When loading and unloading the film rolls, he intentionally exposed them to sunlight and created reel-end flares to emphasize "the materiality of film".

Frampton's films are often titled after specialized scientific disciplines, as in the case of Maxwell's Demon, Prince Rupert's Drops, and Hapax Legomena. In the early 1960s minimalist artist Carl Andre described to Frampton the Dedekind cut, which partitions a totally ordered set into two subsets, one of whose elements are all less than those of the other, and can be used to construct the real numbers. He became interested in the relationship between set theory and film while working on his ongoing project Magellan. Frampton titled Zorns Lemma after Zorn's lemma (also known as the Kuratowski–Zorn lemma), a proposition of set theory formulated by mathematician Max Zorn in 1935. Zorn's lemma describes partially ordered sets where every totally ordered subset has an upper bound. The letters and images in Zorns Lemma are sets whose order is discovered during the course of the film.

== Release ==
Zorns Lemma premiered at the Philharmonic Hall for the 1970 New York Film Festival. It was the first experimental feature film to be screened there. J. Hoberman wrote that it "drove the audience mad", and Howard Thompson observed that "never, at least so far during the Film Festival, have so many Philharmonic Hall viewers slithered outside for a cigarette." Nevertheless, the sale of Zorns Lemma was a financial success for Frampton.

The film was released on home media by the Criterion Collection, as a part of A Hollis Frampton Odyssey in Blu-ray and DVD.

== Reception and legacy ==
Amos Vogel called Zorns Lemma a "radical example of reductive cinema" that warned of "things to come ... 'meaning' (political, psychological, personal, or whatever) has been eliminated and the work exists purely for itself, demanding attention to structure, pattern, and orchestration." Kevin Thomas of the Los Angeles Times described the film as "a thoroughly demanding but highly stimulating exercise in heightening our awareness of the possibilities of visual perception and, indeed, the ways in which we create meaning itself". The experimental filmmaker Ernie Gehr stated, "Zorns Lemma is a major poetic work. Created and put together by a very clear eye, this original and complex abstract work moves beyond the letters of the alphabet, beyond words and beyond Freud."

Critics have interpreted Stan Brakhage's 1972 film The Riddle of Lumen as a response to Zorns Lemma. Director Peter Greenaway has cited the film as an influence on his work, based on its illustration of how to "structure a film without necessarily using narrative". Greenaway's 1973 short film H Is for House presents long lists of words beginning with the letter h, and his later feature films The Draughtsman's Contract and A Zed & Two Noughts feature children reciting abecedaries. Su Friedrich adapted the structure of Zorns Lemma for her 1990 film Sink or Swim. Originally intending to represent each letter of the alphabet with multiple words, Friedrich ultimately used a 26-segment structure that moves in reverse alphabetical order.

Zorns Lemma received three critics' votes in the 2012 Sight & Sound polls of the world's greatest films. It is now part of Anthology Film Archives' Essential Cinema Repertory collection.
