= Carriage trade =

Carriage trade may refer to:

- Trade in carriages
- Carriage trade (social class), category of wealthy customers, those who can afford owning a carriage
- Carriage Trade, 1971 American experimental film
- Carriage trade quadrant, category in customer profitability analysis
