= The Riddle of Lumen =

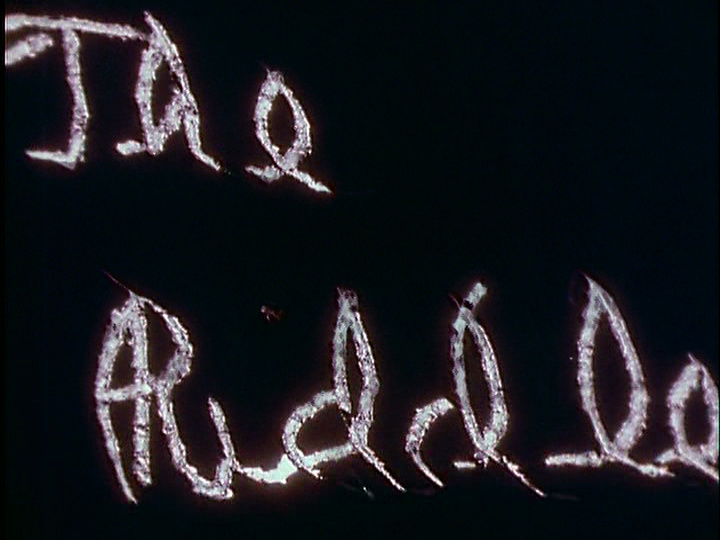
- Directed by: Stan Brakhage
- Cinematography: Stan Brakhage
- Edited by: Stan Brakhage
- Release date: 1972
- Running time: 13 minutes
- Country: United States
- Language: Silent

The Riddle of Lumen is a 1972 American experimental short film by Stan Brakhage.

== Production ==
Brakhage made the film as a response to Hollis Frampton's 1970 film Zorns Lemma. The two filmmakers had been engaged in what P. Adams Sitney described as "a somewhat competitive dialogue about the place of cinema in modernism." He assembled The Riddle of Lumen from footage left over from previous projects.

== Analysis ==
The Riddle of Lumen is an early instance of polyvalent montage. In this style of editing, there are connections between shots that are not immediately obvious to the viewer, but which accumulate over the course of the film. Critic Clinton Delancey notes two recurring images in the film: "that of sunlight flooding through the door or window of a darkened room…and that of light pools bleaching out sections of the floor". Fred Camper identifies it as Brakhage's most abstract film and contrasts it with his other works for its complex patterns of visual substitutions, the monadic context of its imagery, and the way it "works with the light of entire frames [rather than] frames showing light within them".

== Release and reception ==
In his review for The New York Times, A. H. Weiler wrote that "vision and color are artistically heightened as [Brakhage] captures varying light on objects, people, water, streets, skies and forest."

The film was the inspiration for Through the Mysterious Barricade (after F. Couperin) LUMEN 1 (for Stan Brakhage), a 1990 musical improvisation by Fluxus composer Philip Corner. Brakhage used the piece as the soundtrack for his film Passage Through: A Ritual, one of the director's few works to include sound.

The Riddle of Lumen is part of Anthology Film Archives' Essential Cinema Repertory collection. A digital transfer was made for the film's inclusion in the 2008 DVD collection Treasures IV: American Avant-Garde Film, 1947–1986.

== Bibliography ==
- Sitney, P. Adams (2014). The Cinema of Poetry. Oxford University Press. ISBN 978-0-19-933702-6.
- Smigel, Eric (2017). "Sights and Sounds of the Moving Mind: The Visionary Soundtracks of Stan Brakhage". In Rogers, Holly; Barham, Jeremy (eds.). The Music and Sound of Experimental Film. Oxford University Press. ISBN 978-0-19-046989-4.
