= Wenyon & Gamble =

Susan Gamble
- Born: 1957 (age 68–69); Edmonton, London, England
- Education: Winchester School of Art; Goldsmiths College; University of Cambridge
- Known for: Photography, Installation art, Holography
- Awards: UNESCO Prize for the Promotion of the Arts; Shearwater Foundation Holography Award

Michael Wenyon
- Born: 1955 (age 70–71); Dayton, Ohio, U.S.
- Education: University of Bristol; Imperial College London
- Known for: Photography, Installation art, Holography
- Awards: UNESCO Prize for the Promotion of the Arts; Shearwater Foundation Holography Award; Winston Churchill Traveling Fellowship

Wenyon & Gamble is the name used by the art team of Susan Gamble and Michael Wenyon.

Susan Gamble & Michael Wenyon are collaborating visual artists, known for their work using holography and for art works resulting from their residencies in observatories and other scientific institutions. As a team they have worked with photographic technology since 1983. They are married and have lived together since 1981.

In 1993 they were awarded the UNESCO Prize for the Promotion of The Arts, for their contributions to new technology art.

As a team they combine different academic backgrounds: Gamble has a BA in Fine Art from Goldsmiths' College, London and a PhD in the History and Philosophy of Science from Cambridge University. Wenyon has a BSc in physics from Bristol University, UK, and an MSc in optics, from Imperial College London; on graduating, he wrote one of the first popular textbooks on holography.

The British writer Marina Benjamin said about their work:

Wenyon and Gamble are deaf to John Keats's accusation that Newton destroyed the rainbow; they applaud the artistic merit of theory, the authored character of science, and the beauty of artifice.

== Meeting & Early Work ==
Susan Gamble and Michael Wenyon met in 1980 at Goldsmiths' Holography Workshop, Goldsmiths' College, University of London, an experimental studio set up for artists to experiment with holograms, the first such facility in Europe. They were the founding staff of the Workshop, modeled on an open-access print-making studio, providing holographic instruction and equipment rental for visiting artists and art students. The Workshop was funded by the Calouste Gulbenkian Foundation, the Rockefeller Foundation, and the Arts Council of Great Britain. Wenyon & Gamble organized a traveling exhibition from the workshop, The Holography Show, which opened at the Orchard Gallery, Derry and toured to seven other museums in England, Wales and Northern Ireland during 1982; the exhibition featured work by eight artists who had used the facility, including Bill Culbert, Jeremy Diggle, Peter Donebauer, Liliane Lijn and Andrew Logan. Other visiting artists included Bill Molteni and Rick Silberman.

Wenyon & Gamble's first collaborative exhibition, Wenyon & Gamble: New Holograms, was at the Glynn Vivian Art Gallery, Swansea, Wales, in 1984. The exhibition was opened by Sue Davies, the founder of The Photographers' Gallery, London.

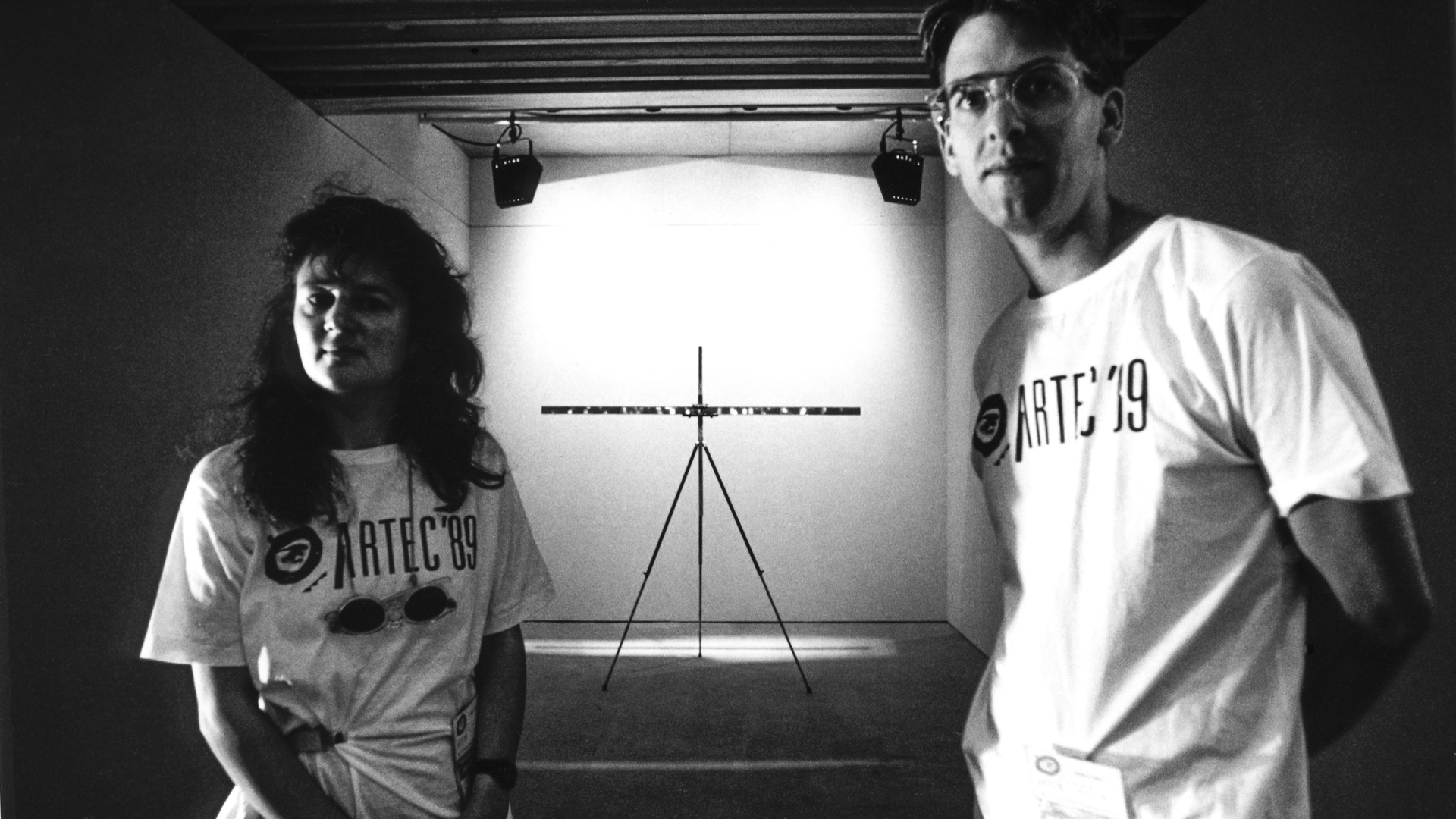
Susan Gamble and Michael Wenyon, Nagoya, Japan, 1989, with 'Zone One' from 'The Heavens'.

== Joint Art Work ==
In 1987, Wenyon & Gamble were appointed artists in residence at the Royal Greenwich Observatory, then based in Herstmonceux Castle, Sussex. It was a joint appointment with the composer and performer Ron Geesin, funded by South East Arts, a regional branch of the Arts Council of Great Britain. Wenyon & Gamble produced holographic works based on the optical experiments of Isaac Newton. They also began to produce work around the themes of optics and science for which they became known in this medium.

Wenyon & Gamble lived in Japan between 1990 and 1992, teaching holography and fine art on the Plastics Arts & Mixed Media postgraduate program at the Institute of Art & Design, University of Tsukuba, near Tokyo. Working in a small holography facility over two years, they made a series of holograms of books from the university library. The books included many English-language art books translated into Japanese—texts by Ernst Gombrich and Bernard Leach—as well as Japanese books which interested the artists for their form and structure but which they were unable to read. The resulting installation Bibliography was exhibited in 1992 at the Tokyo Metropolitan Museum of Photography, and later the same year at the Art Tower Mito in Mito, Ibaraki, with support from the British Council.

The artists received a fellowship from the Leverhulme Trust in 1994 to work at the Royal Observatory, Edinburgh.

Between 1993 and 2000 Wenyon & Gamble were based in Boston, where Gamble was a Fellow at the Center for Advanced Visual Studies, Massachusetts Institute of Technology and Wenyon designed holographic products for the Polaroid Corporation. During this time they produced an installation Bibliomancy of holograms of books using an unused photographic darkroom at the Boston Athenæum, one of America's oldest libraries. Historian Norman Bryson wrote of this work in the exhibition catalog:

The truly fascinating dimension of holography, and of this installation, is its overcoming of historical fixity, or temporal closure: because the hologram exists always and only in the present, it can never be captured and confined within linear time. Its inability to arrive on the scene of history in any definitive or final sense is precisely what is magical about it.

At this time Wenyon & Gamble were also resident artists at the Haystack Observatory of MIT, a radio observatory with no optical telescopes. The photographs they made there, using the telescopes themselves as a rotating camera platform, "are dead-pan representations that demystify the industry of science and its fetishistic dependence upon equipment".

They have also produced public artworks, including The Quiet Sun, 2002, a mosaic in a swimming pool at the White Horse Leisure Centre, Abingdon, Oxfordshire, based on a solar spectrum from the SOHO Satellite managed by the Rutherford Appleton Laboratory.

Using photography since 2000 they have documented scientific laboratories, observatories, and sites used for popular science presentations in the United States, United Kingdom, Cuba and India.

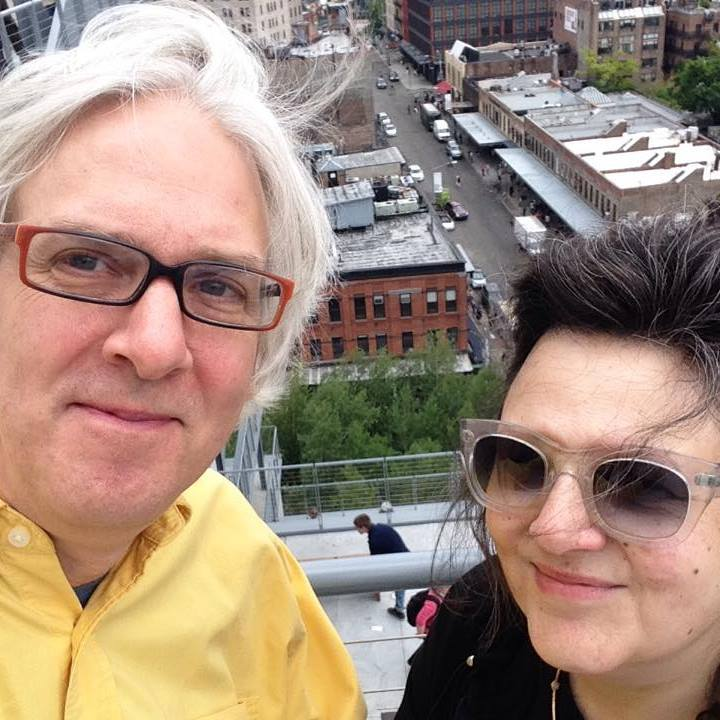
Susan Gamble and Michael Wenyon, New York City. 2016.

Their panoramic photograph of Steve Squyres, the principal investigator on the Mars Exploration Rover team, taken in his office at Cornell University, is in the National Portrait Gallery, Washington, DC; it was exhibited in Americans Now at the Gallery in 2010/11.

The exhibition A Universe held up for Inspection was held at the MagnanMetz Gallery, New York, April 20 – May 25, 2012.

Domes & Palaces – Constructing Science was exhibited at the New York Hall of Science, June 18 – September 11, 2016. Art critic and author Eleanor Heartney wrote an accompanying text about this work

Out of Place is the artists' most recent exhibition at the Magnan Metz Gallery, New York, from November 4 to December 17, 2016.

== Public Collections ==
Wenyon & Gamble's works are in public collections including the Victoria and Albert Museum, the National Academy of Sciences, DeCordova Museum and Sculpture Park, the List Visual Arts Center (MIT), and the National Portrait Gallery (United States). They have exhibited at the Tate Liverpool, and the Whitney Museum of American Art.
