= Nostalgia (1971 film) =

Film by artist Hollis Frampton

(nostalgia)
- Directed by: Hollis Frampton
- Narrated by: Michael Snow
- Release date: 1971
- Running time: 38 minutes
- Country: United States
- Language: English

Nostalgia, styled (nostalgia), is a 1971 American experimental film by artist Hollis Frampton. It is part of his Hapax Legomena series.

== Summary ==
The film is composed of black-and-white still photographs taken by Frampton during his early artistic explorations which are slowly burned on the element of a hot plate, while the soundtrack offers personal comments on the content of the images, read by fellow artist Michael Snow. Each comment/story is heard in succession before the related photograph appears onscreen, thus causing the viewer to actively engage with the 'past' and 'present' moments as presented within the film.

== Legacy ==
In 2003, Nostalgia was selected for preservation in the United States National Film Registry by the Library of Congress as being "culturally, historically, or aesthetically significant". The Librarian of Congress, James H. Billington described it (along with Film Portrait by Jerome Hill) as "avant-garde classics considered eloquent and evocative explorations of memory and family". The film is part of Anthology Film Archives' Essential Cinema Repertory collection.

It is available on the DVD collection Treasures IV: American Avant-Garde Film, 1947-1986 (2008), as well as in a Hollis Frampton box set from the Criterion Collection A Hollis Frampton Odyssey (2012).

== See also ==
- List of American films of 1971
- Nostalgia
- Still image film
