= Special Effects =

A special effect is an illusion or visual trick used in the film, television, theatre, video game, and simulator industries.

Special Effect(s) may also refer to:

- Tokusatsu, Japanese film genre that literally means "special effects."
- Special Effects (album), an album by Tech N9ne
- Special Effects (film), a 1984 film by Larry Cohen
- Special Effects, a 1972 film from Hollis Frampton's Hapax Legomena cycle
- Special Effects: Anything Can Happen, a 1996 documentary film
- SpecialEffect, a UK-based charity
