= Sally Gross (choreographer) =

American postmodernist dancer (1933–2015)

- Born: Sarah Freiberg; August 3, 1933; Lower East Side
- Died: July 20, 2015 (aged 81); Sag Harbor, New York

Sally Gross (née Sarah Freiberg; August 3, 1933 – July 20, 2015) was an American postmodernist dancer.

Freiberg was a Lower East Side-born American dancer, choreographer and teacher of dance from her beginnings in the avant-garde NYC art world in the 1950s until her death. Later known as Sally Gross, she was a notable participant of the avant-garde dance group called the Judson Dance Theater during the 1960s. Gross died in Sag Harbor, New York on July 20, 2015, aged 81, from ovarian cancer.

== Background and career ==
Gross, the youngest child of Jewish immigrant parents from Poland, was born on the Lower East Side. She once created a dance based upon her experiences assisting in her father's pushcart vending business, speaking Yiddish, her first language. A graduate of Washington Irving High School and Brooklyn College, she continued to live and work in New York City throughout most of her life.

She began her dance training at the Henry Street Settlement House, where innovative modern dance choreographer, composer and designer Alwin Nikolais was in residence by 1948, developing his abstract cross disciplinary performance style. Perhaps this experience inspired her lifelong search for diverse approaches to movement, from which she evolved her uniquely spare and personal performance works. Her lifelong studies also included classes and workshops with the modern dancers Erick Hawkins, James Waring, Merce Cunningham and Anna Halprin, in addition to ballet, classical Japanese dance, traditional Balinese dance, the neuro-muscular-skeletal re-education systems of Mabel Elsworth Todd, Lulu Sweigard and Charlotte Selver, yoga, and tai chi.

Perhaps the first major art work Sally Gross appeared in was the iconic Beat Generation 1959 film by Robert Frank and Alfred Leslie, Pull My Daisy, where she played the bishop's sister. She was one of the original participants in the choreography classes offered by musician Robert Dunn at Merce Cunningham's Studio starting in 1960, where he applied ideas from music composition, particularly the chance systems associated with John Cage, to dance composition. She continued to participate in Dunn's classes when they moved into the basement gym of Judson Memorial Church on Washington Square in Greenwich Village. Those sessions led directly into the formation of what became known as the Judson Dance Theater Workshop, founded on rigorously democratic and egalitarian principles that, especially with its rejection of super-technical achievements, was shocking to the establishment dance world of its day but is now regarded as a pivotal cross-disciplinary movement that advanced expanded definitions and tools for dance in particular and performance in general.

During the early 1960s, Gross performed in the company of Merle Marsicano, whose abstract choreography paralleled abstract expressionism then considered the avant-garde in the visual arts, and where she was likely introduced to the approaches to movement based on the ideokinesis system of Lulu Sweigard, as Marsicano had been her long-time assistant.

By 1962 she began a lifetime of yearly performances of her own works in small loft theaters, galleries, churches, outdoor festivals, Merce Cunningham's studio and her own Westbeth studio, besides respected downtown art venues such as the DIA Center for the Arts, the Joyce Soho and Joyce Theater, and The Construction Company. Performing both as a soloist and with her company that usually consisted of women only, she carefully honed her works in collaborations with longtime company members including her daughters, Sidonia and Rachel, and later regulars Jamie Di Mare, Heather Lee, Tanja Meding and Gabriela Simon. Another long-time collaborator was lighting designer Blu, whose work frequently garnered praise, for being "poetic" and "painterly." She also performed in works by Yvonne Rainer, Judith Dunn, Elaine Summers, Meredith Monk, and Robert Wilson, among others.

In addition to teaching dance technique, movement workshops, tai chi, improvisation and choreography classes in her studio, Gross taught at City College of New York for many years, at Fordham University and CUNY/Kingsborough College. She was honored with a 2001 Guggenheim Fellowship, a National Endowment for the Arts US/Japan Creative Artist Fellowship, a Harkness Foundation for Dance award, a 2000 Tanne Award and was a multiple year recipient of the Mary Flagler Cary Charitable Trust/Live Music or Dance Award.

In 2009, Brooklyn College honored her with a Life Time Achievement Award. During guest artist visits and her semester long residency in 2012 at the University of Wisconsin-Madison's Interdisciplinary Arts Institute, she collaborated on two major films with Douglas Rosenberg. Gross continued to perform and create new works until shortly before her death at the age of 81. Her archives will reside at the New York Public Library for the Performing Arts.

== Dance styles and legacy ==
Sally Gross framed her dances in terms of autobiography. "All of my dance is autobiographical," she once said, "I don't think I've left any of my history out." Dance historian Leslie Satin also documents that Gross began "One and Another," a 1983 solo created shortly after the death of her mother, by stating: "I always thought the time would come when I would have to say something…I wouldn’t know what to say, so I decided…to move."

In a New York Times feature article by dance critic Gia Kourlas (February 29, 2004) titled "Vibrating To The Ideas Of Beckett," Ms. Gross said: "I don’t usually talk about the work, because to me the work is the work….There are so many people who have never seen my work, and it's O.K. with me….I’m not politic. I've been here for such a long time, and we’re still doing the work. That's all that really matters."

On other occasions, Ms. Gross spoke of her interest in stillness and silence, titling one work premiered in 2007 as The Pleasure of Stillness, which documentary filmmaker Albert Maysles adopted as the title for his film about her, also completed in 2007. Maysles said, "I was intrigued to see how she is affected by everyday events, movements and occurrences, which she incorporates in her work. At first sight I thought, ‘Where is the dance?’, but I came to admire the intensity and sensitivities that she and her dancers bring to her work. I learned that dance can also be found in stillness."

In describing her works, reviewers evoked such adjectives as simple, small-scale, workmanlike, blunt, wry, tender, delicate, elusive, fundamental, serene, mysterious, and intense unexpressed emotion. New York Times dance critic Jennifer Dunning hailed Sally Gross as "the most poetic of minimalist choreographers." Dunning explained Gross "can indicate complex atmospheres and personal histories with the most minimal of brush strokes and the simplest of props." In a 1988 review, Dunning further admired how Gross "distills powerful emotions and suggestions of social situations in small, delicate and utterly simple pieces that have the quality both of fully wrought masterworks and murmured anecdotes." The Village Voice dance critic Deborah Jowitt wrote: "Every moment in a work by Sally Gross appears to be immaculate, chosen with care," and in another review saw her work as: "Life’s wildness compressed into haiku." Bruce Weber, obituary reporter for The New York Times, wrote: "Ms. Gross's work, built from the fundamentals of spare, precise movement and gesture and staged with a painter's eye for figures in space, was emblematic. Inspired, as she often said, by literature and art, and by details of her own autobiography, she translated those elements into elliptical, impressionistic tableaus."

Her works often depended upon the layering of long series of details, built out over an extended rehearsal period as Gross and her company of dancers improvised upon a score supplied by Gross. Generally only known to the performers, its cues might sound like riddles if heard by the audience. When not referencing an existing literary text, her scores could take the form of poetic bits and pieces by Gross, be a list of body parts, prepositions, numbers or compass directions, or be determined by choices of a set piece or prop, such as a bench, ladder, rope, or roll of photographic paper, and the particulars of the performing space (for instance, more than once in her career she contained a dance within the narrow grey painted stairway between the two floors of her Westbeth studio). Then details of each weekly rehearsal were sifted through, and decisions agreed upon that eventually coalesced into the content of the performance. Jamie Di Mare, who worked with Ms. Gross almost thirty years as a dancer and later joined her as co-teacher at Corlears School, explained how rehearsals began with all walking in unison for a few minutes: "We leave the outside behind and find a peaceful place to focus on the little details….That way we form one unit and breathe together before we even start to rehearse." As a result, the dancers became so attuned to one another that it was not clear if, in performance, elements of improvisation remained.

Revered as a teacher of movement and meditation, she invoked walking and breathing as central elements of each class, the same discipline her company maintained in their warm-up rituals. Gross said in reference to why she began teaching a class largely attended by non-dancers, which continued to meet in her studio for forty years: "I had done lots of things I thought were really appropriate for people who were non-dancers but wanted to dance…I don’t think there’s any end to investigating oneself, because we are constantly changing….So I’m here to change with them."

== List of choreographed works (partial, dated at premiere performance) ==
- (1962) 32.16 Feet per Second Squared, an improvisation with Laura de Freitas and June Ekman. Turnau Opera House, Woodstock.
- (1963) Back Country Blues. Recorded music: Mose Allison's "Back Country Blues".
- (1964) Pearls Down Pat, an improvisation with Carla Blank. Judson Concert #14.
- (1964) Untitled Duet, an improvisation with Carla Blank. Annenberg Auditorium, University of Pennsylvania, Philadelphia.
- (1964) Conjunctions. Large group dance. Judson Concert #16.
- (1964) In Their own Time. Improvisation for six performers with music by Philip Corner. Judson Concert #16).
- (1971) Off the Wall, Westbeth Studio, NY.
- (1975) Rope, duet with harmonicas and rope by Sally and Sidonia Gross
- (1976) One of Us, Two of Us, Maybe Three, performed by Sally, Rachel and Sidonia Gross
- (1980) Split. Westbeth Studio, NY.
- (c. 1980s, exact year unknown) In Her Own Time, performed by Toby Glanternik, Sally Gross, Sidonia Gross, Carol Ritter. Music by Philip Corner, piano. Cubiculo.
- (1981) Parallels. Pratt Institute, Brooklyn and Manhattan.
- (1983) One and Another. Solo, with Gross telling stories in Yiddish.
- (1984) Petit Air, duet and Bee’s Piece. Walden School, NY.
- (1985) Three Rolled Into One. AIR Gallery, NY.
- (1985) In the Beginning. Westbeth Studio, NY.
- (1986) Domain. Creative Time, NY.
- (1987) Crossings. Quartet. A suite in five parts, with music by Peter Griggs; Domain, a duet with Sidonia Gross. Dia Art Foundation. Review: Jennifer Dunning in The New York Times.
- (1988) Coram, with music by Peter Griggs and performed with Iris Brooks and Steven Silverstein; The Other Side; Queue; An Incredibly Foreign Language, to taped readings of texts by Marguerite Duras and Gross. Performed by Sally Gross with Jamie Di Mare, Sidonia Gross, Dara Van Laanen and Julie Winokur. Womanworks Festival at the Joyce Theater. Review: Jennifer Dunning in The New York Times.
- (1989) Letter to Esther, a duet performed by Jamie Di Mare and Sally Gross, with music by Le Mystère des Voix Bulgares. Dia Foundation for the Arts.
- (1990) Frontal Plane. Performed by Jamie Di Mare, Sally Gross, Sidonia Gross, Murray Kelley. Music by Peter Griggs and construction by Patsy Norvell. Warren Street Performance Loft. Reviews: Village Voice; Attitude Magazine.
- (1991) Middle Ground, duet with ladders, music by Yoshi Wada. Cunningham Studio. Review: The New York Times.
- (1991) Dancing at Dia. Including Giacometti Falls, trio with music by Peter Griggs; ALBUM, with music by Eleanor Hovda. Dia Center for the Arts. Review: Village Voice.
- (1992) A Night At The Ohio. Sally Gross and company in collaboration with musicians Peter Griggs and Yoshi Wada, inspired by the work of Samuel Beckett. Ohio Theater.
- (1993) Field of Stones. Performed by Dawn Bauer, Jamie Di Mare, Sidonia Gross, Murray Kelley, Gabriela Simon, Sally Gross. Music by Yoshi Wada with musicians Wayne Hankin, Evans Wolforth and Michael Hinton; Arrangements, in collaboration with guest artist Bryan Hayes. Dia Center for the Arts. Review: The New York Times (03/29/1993).
- (1994) Recuerda, solo; Present, solo; Middle Ground In Two Parts, duet with Jamie Di Mare and ladders; and Margins, quartet with Jamie Di Mare, Sidonia Gross and Gabriela Simon. Review: Deborah Jowitt in Village Voice (06/07/1994).
- (1994) Excerpts from old Works in a new Setting, performed by Jamie Di Mare, Sally Gross, Sidonia Gross, Anne Lall, Gabriela Simon. Lincoln Center Out-Of-Doors at the Fountain Plaza.
- (1995) Dancing at Dia. Performed by Sally Gross with Jamie Di Mare, Mei-Yin Ng, Gabriela Simon, Olga Tragant. Guest Composer Wayne Evan Hankin. Dia Center for the Arts.
- (1996) Divided in Thirds. At Barnard College and University Settlement. Review: The New York Times.
- (1996) Dance and Commentary at SECCA Winston-Salem, NC. Review: Wall Street Journal; and Ackland Art Museum, Chapel Hill, N.C.
- (1996) 25 Years of Dance: Performed by Sally Gross & Company, including Jamie Di Mare, Sidonia Gross, Dominique Simonneaux, Gabriela Simon. Cunningham Studio.
- (1997) Rope. Judson Memorial Church Performance Event for Robert Dunn.
- (1998) Suddenly then She... Performed by Sally Gross, Jamie Di Mare, Jesika Gastonguay, Mei Yin Ng, and Corinne Sarian. Music by Robert Een with Jeff Berman on vibraphone and Katie Geissinger, vocalist. Joyce Soho.
- (1999) Pleasures of the Imagination: 64 Beginnings, an improvisation performed to a text by Spencer Holst, read by Jennifer Farbar and the author. Bank Street Theater.
- (2000) Where’s Jake, a solo with text by Sally Gross; Roof on the Well, a quartet with music by Robert Een, performed with musicians Katie Geissinger and Bill Ruyle and dancers Jamie Di Mare, Mei-Yin Ng, Corinne Sarian and Gabriela Simon; Don, trio with song by Robert Een; an improvised duet with Sally Silvers. At Merce Cunningham Studio; Review: Jennifer Dunning, The New York Times (12/13/2000).
- (2001) Dreaming, performed by Sally Gross with Jamie Di Mare and Gabriela Simon. The Construction Company.
- (2002) At the Border, performed by Sally Gross with Jamie Di Mare, Gabriela Simon. Joyce Soho. Review: The New York Times.
- (2003) Apostrophe, a solo performed by Sally Gross, with music by Gloria Coates; and a work-in-progress, AHA, a trio performed by Jamie Di Mare, Emily Schottland, and Gabriela Simon, with music by Bruce Gremo. Inspired by Wallace Stevens poem "The Well Dressed Man With a Beard", from which the program quotes: "after the final no there comes a yes". The Construction Company. Review: Bearnstow Journal.
- (2004) An evening of new dances including the official premiere of Aha, a trio performed by Jamie Di Mare (red), Tanja Meding (aqua), and Gabriela Simon (black) set to a score by Bruce Gremo and inspired by Wallace Stevens’ poem "The Well Dressed Man With a Beard"; If They Were, a duet performed by Jamie Di Mare and Tanja Meding with music by Somei Satoh; and here and here, a solo performed by Sally Gross with music by Dan Evans Farkas. Joyce Soho. Review: The New York Times.
- (2005) New Work: In Silence, performed by Jamie Di Mare, Tanja Meding, Maria Parshina, Gabriela Simon, and Cho Ying Tsai; With Words, performed by Sally Gross to an audio tape of Joe Chaikin rehearsing Samuel Beckett's Text for Nothing, with video by Karen Robbins; With Music, performed by Jamie Di Mare, Tanja Meding, Maria Parshina, Gabriela Simon, and Cho Ying Tsai with music by Robert Poss. The Construction Company. Review: The New York Times.
- (2006) Seeing Winter Out, an evening of dances by Sally Gross and Company: including premieres of With Words No. 2, a solo by Sally Gross dancing to a recording of Joseph Chaikin rehearsing Samuel Beckett's How It Is, and video by Karen Robbins; With Music No. 2, performed by Jamie Di Mare, Heather Lee, Tanja Meding, Maria Parshina, and Gabriela Simon, with music by Robert Poss. Joyce Soho.
- (2007) The Pleasure of Stillness, including the premieres of Songs, a solo performed by Sally Gross to two Leonard Cohen songs. The Pleasure Of Stillness, performed by Jamie Di Mare, Heather Lee, Tanja Meding, Maria Parshina, Gabriela Simon, with music by Robert Poss. Joyce Soho. Reviews: The New York Times; Village Voice.
- (2008) Cell Phone Piece. Anthology Film Archives Event for Phill Niblock.
- (2008) Middle of Autumn - 1,2,3,4, and Back To 1, including the premieres of At Long Last, a solo performed by Jamie Di Mare; Fold, a duet by Jamie Di Mare and Tanja Meding; A Language All Their Own, with music by Robert Poss. Performed by Jamie Di Mare, Heather Lee, Tanja Meding; L’Autre, a solo with text and performed by Sally Gross. Joyce Soho.
- (2009) One and Another (1983). University of Wisconsin.
- (2009) Short Stories. University Settlement.
- (2010) With Words. Performance with video excerpt at Cunningham Studio.
- (2010) Working in the Studio. At SG's Westbeth studio.
- (2010) Songs. At Hunter College Alwin Nikolais Centennial.
- (2011) Looking Forward, including premieres of Three, with music by Goldmund (Keith Kenniff), Another Three, with music composed and performed by Alex Mincek; and Threefold, in silence, all trios performed by Jamie Di Mare, Heather Lee, and Tanja Meding. Two, a duet performed by Heather Lee and Tanja Meding, with music by Robert Poss; and One, a solo performed by Sally Gross with music by David Byrne and Brian Eno. At Joyce Soho. Reviews: The New York Times; Attitude Magazine.
- (2012) Take Another Look, including premieres of Homage to Mondrian, performed by Jamie Di Mare (blue), Heather Lee (yellow), and Tanja Meding (red) with music by John Cage and costumes by Ann Hamilton;Lines and Phrase, both trios performed by Jamie Di Mare, Heather Lee, and Tanja Meding; and Solo, performed between the trios by Sally Gross, after a poem by Frank Kuenstler. Sally Gross's Westbeth studio.
- (2012) Here And Now With Leo Villareal, in collaboration with University of Wisconsin at Madison workshop participants. Madison Museum of Contemporary Art.
- (2012) Beauty. Site specific in stairwell at Westbeth.
- (2014) Sally, a program shared with choreographer-dancers Sally Silvers and Sally Bowden: including the premiere of Not Everything Is Seen, a solo performed by Sally Gross with music by claves and text. Presented by The Construction Company at University Settlement.
- (2014) Velvet. Site specific at Westbeth.
- (2014) A Sonnet in Movement. Westbeth Art Gallery. Performed by Jamie Di Mare, Heather Lee, Tanja Meding and Gabriela Simon.
- (2014) The Horse’s Mouth. Film excerpt at Tisch School of the Arts/Dance.
- (2015) Door to Door. Site specific performed in a hallway at Westbeth Fest. Performed by Jamie Di Mare, Heather Lee, Tanja Meding.

== List of films documenting the work of Sally Gross (partial) ==
- (1978) Stopped in Her Tracks. Susan Brockman, filmmaker.
- (1982) Lee’s Ferry. Susan Brockman, filmmaker.
- (1984) Black and White. Joshua Blum, filmmaker.
- (1995) Raw Materials. filmmaker unknown.
- (2001) Sally Gross: A Life in Dance. Michael Blackwood, filmmaker.
- (2002) A Life in Dance. Michael Blackwood, director.
- (2004) Portrait. Bryan Hayes, filmmaker.
- (2007) The Pleasure of Stillness. Documentary by filmmaker Albert Maysles, director Kristen Nutile, and producer Tanja Meding. Premiered at the Locarno International Film Festival, Switzerland.
- (2012) Circling. Douglas Rosenberg, filmmaker.
- (2014) Here Now with Sally Gross. Douglas Rosenberg, filmmaker. Premiered at the Lincoln Center film festival, Dance on Camera, New York.

== List of films in which Sally Gross appears as a performer (partial) ==
- (1959) Pull My Daisy. Robert Frank and Alfred Leslie, filmmakers; Jack Kerouac, script.
- (2009) KOOL, Dancing in My Mind. 30 minutes. Short documentary. Directed by Richard Rutkowski and Robert Wilson. Produced by Jorn Weisbrodt, Rutkowski and Hisami Kuroiwa. Co-produced by ARTE and INA. Editing by Keiko Deguchi and Brendan Russell.
- (2011) The Space in Back of You. 68 minute documentary. Premiered at the 2012 Lincoln Center film festival, Dance on Camera, New York. Directed and with principal cinematography by Richard Rutkowski. Produced by Hisami Kuroiwa and Richard Rutkowski. Principal film editor, Keiku Deguchi. Dramaturge: Carla Blank. Includes interviews with David Byrne, musician; Molly Davies, filmmaker; Anna Halprin, choreographer; Simone Forti, choreographer; Hans Peter Kuhn, composer; Yoshio Yabara, designer; Yachiyo Inoue V, the granddaughter of Ms. Hanayagi's master teacher, Yachiyo Inoue IV, and Carla Blank, choreographer, dramaturge.
