= Simon Martin =

Simon Martin may refer to:

- Simon Martin (artist) (born 1965), British artist
- Simon Martin (Mayanist), British historian, epigrapher and Mayanist scholar
- Simon Martin (bowls) (born 1976), Northern Irish lawn bowler
- Simon Martin-Brisac, (born 1992), French field hockey player
