= Steve Squyres =

Professor of Physical Sciences at Cornell University

Steven W. Squyres
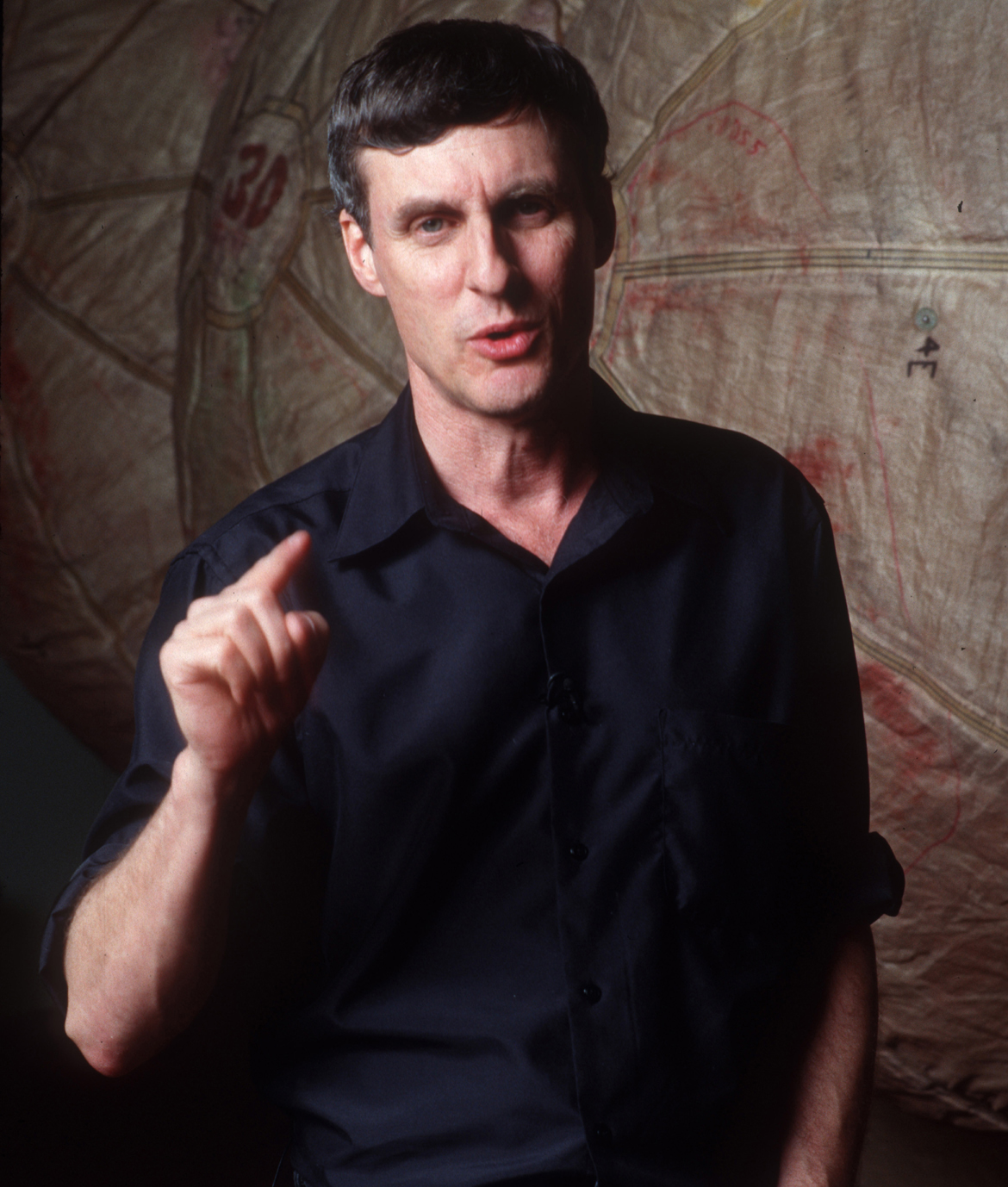
- Born: January 9, 1956 (age 70); Wenonah, New Jersey, U.S.
- Education: Cornell University (B.A. and PhD)
- Occupation: Astronomer
- Known for: Spirit rover and Opportunity rover
- Awards: Harold C. Urey Prize (1987); Carl Sagan Memorial Award (2004); Whipple Award (2012)

Steven Weldon Squyres (born January 9, 1956) is an American geologist and planetary scientist. He was the James A. Weeks Professor of Physical Sciences at Cornell University in Ithaca, New York. His research area is in planetary sciences, with a focus on large solid bodies in the Solar System such as the terrestrial planets and the moons of the Jovian planets. Squyres was the principal investigator of the Mars Exploration Rover Mission (MER).

Squyres is the recipient of the 2004 Carl Sagan Memorial Award and the 2009 Carl Sagan Medal for Excellence in Communication in Planetary Science. Squyres also received the 2010 Mines Medal for his achievements as a researcher and professor. He is the brother of Academy Award-nominated film editor Tim Squyres.

On September 13, 2019, Squyres announced that he would retire from Cornell University on September 22, 2019 to take the position of Chief Scientist at Blue Origin, an aerospace manufacturer.

== Early life ==
Squyres was raised in the town of Wenonah in southwest New Jersey and attended Gateway Regional High School in Woodbury Heights, New Jersey.

== Education ==
Squyres received his B.A. in Geological Sciences from Cornell University in 1978 and his Ph.D. in planetary studies from Cornell University in 1981, where he worked closely with Carl Sagan. He is a member of the Tau Kappa Epsilon (ΤΚΕ) fraternity.

== Career ==
Squyres then spent five years as a postdoctoral associate and research scientist at NASA's Ames Research Center before returning to Cornell University as a faculty member. He received the Harold C. Urey Prize from the Planetary Division of the American Astronomical Society in 1987. In 2007, he was awarded the Benjamin Franklin medal in Earth and Environmental Science from the Franklin Institute in Philadelphia.

=== NASA ===
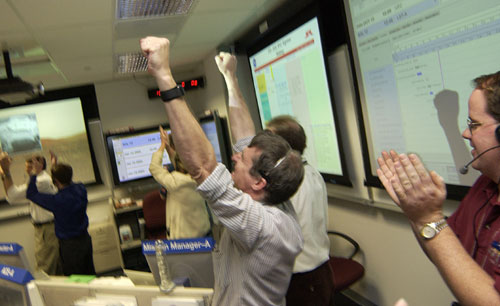
Squyres reacts to the images of Spirit leaving its lander, January 2004

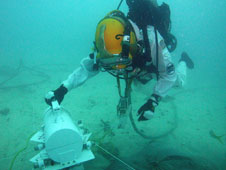
Squyres performing underwater EVA during the NEEMO 15 mission, October 2011

Squyres has participated in many of NASA's planetary exploration missions. From 1978 to 1981 he was an associate of the Voyager mission to Jupiter and Saturn, participating in analysis of imaging data. He subsequently worked as a radar investigator on the Magellan mission to Venus, and with the Near Earth Asteroid Rendezvous mission. Along with his work as principal investigator on the MER (Mars Exploration Rovers), he is also a co-investigator on the 2003 Mars Express and 2005 Mars Reconnaissance Orbiter missions, a member of the Gamma-Ray Spectrometer Flight Investigation Team for the Mars Odyssey mission, and a member of the imaging team for the Cassini to Saturn. Squyres served as Chair of the NASA Space Science Advisory Committee and as a member of the NASA Advisory Council (NAC). In November 2011, NASA Administrator Charles Bolden named Squyres chairman of the NAC, succeeding Kenneth Ford, the founder and director of the Florida Institute for Human and Machine Cognition.

ABC News featured Squyres as its Person of the Week for January 9, 2004, and World News Tonight anchor Peter Jennings said he "has gotten us all excited." Squyres was also given the 2005 Wired Rave Award for science by Wired for overseeing the creation of Spirit and Opportunity that had, at the time, lasted thirteen times longer than expected (1174 vs. 90 Martian days).

Squyres has written a book called Roving Mars: Spirit, Opportunity, and the Exploration of the Red Planet (published August 2005; ISBN 1-4013-0149-5), and appeared on the June 7, 2006 episode of The Colbert Report to discuss it, Mars, and MER. The Disney IMAX documentary film Roving Mars was made from the book.

Squyres was interviewed on 60 Minutes on Sunday, April 6, 2008.

A portrait of Squyres by Susan Gamble and Michael Wenyon was on view in National Portrait Gallery's "Americans Now" exhibition, from August 20, 2010 through July 10, 2011.

On September 19, 2011, NASA announced that Squyres would serve as an aquanaut aboard the Aquarius underwater laboratory during the NEEMO 15 undersea exploration mission from October 17–30, 2011. Delayed by stormy weather and high seas, the mission began on October 20, 2011. On the afternoon of October 21, Squyres and his crewmates officially became aquanauts, having spent over 24 hours underwater. NEEMO 15 ended early on October 26 due to the approach of Hurricane Rina.

Squyres commented in a post-NEEMO 15 interview, "I would love to continue to be part of NEEMO - in any capacity. I'd be happy to go back as a support diver. I think what they are doing is so cool and I was proud to be part of it." In June 2012, Squyres served as a crew member of the NEEMO 16 mission aboard Aquarius, which began on June 11, 2012 and lasted twelve days.

Squyres also contributed to the DAN instrument on the Curiosity rover.

=== Mars Science Laboratory ===
Squyres said in an interview that he would not be the principal investigator for the Mars Science Laboratory, launched in 2011, as he did not want to be away from his family again for a long period (as happened during the Mars Exploration Rover Mission).
