= Lemon (1969 film) =

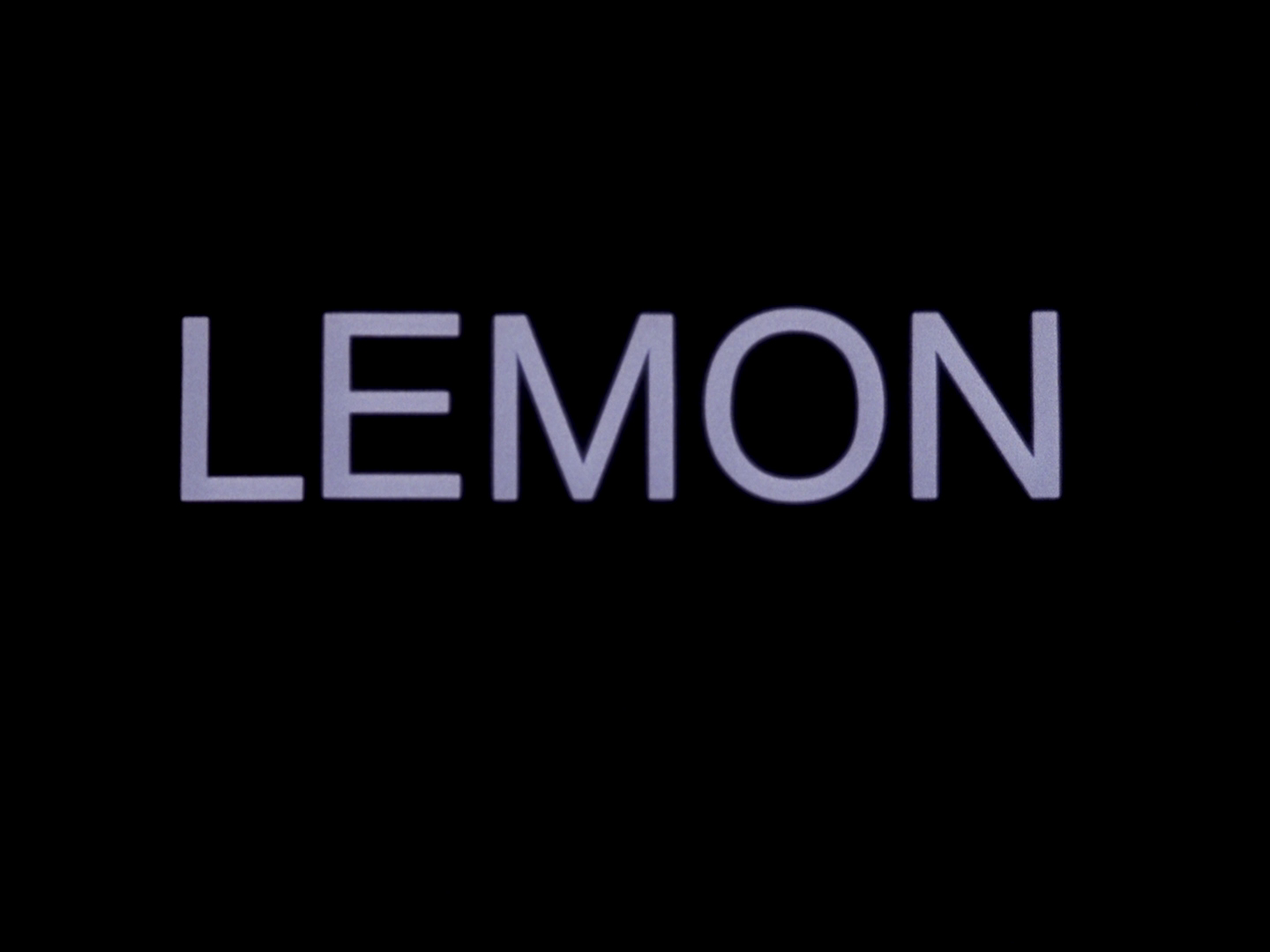
- Directed by: Hollis Frampton
- Distributed by: The Film-Makers' Cooperative
- Release date: 1969
- Running time: 7 minutes
- Country: United States
- Language: Silent

Lemon is a 1969 American experimental short film directed by Hollis Frampton. It shows a lemon under slowly changing lighting conditions.

== Description ==
The lemon, covered by shadow, against a black background

Lemon shows a single lemon in a fixed position, with lighting that changes over the course of the film. At the beginning of the film, the yellow surface appears against a black background, with one end protruding on the right. As the light becomes brighter, more of the lemon becomes visible. The left side of the lemon becomes covered in shadow until only the outline of the right side of the lemon can be seen. After the image briefly fades to black, a back light appears. The lemon becomes a dark silhouette against a bluish background. The film ends with a dedication.

== Production ==
Frampton spent an hour and a half selecting a suitable lemon. He wanted one that would be the "most breastlike, most splendidly citroid." A confused produce manager watched what he was doing, and Frampton ended up purchasing half a dozen lemons.

Frampton shot the film using a Bolex camera. To keep the light source at a fixed distance, he tethered it to a taut wire. He filmed at a higher speed, manually moving the light. Between each take, he had to wind the camera and move the light back slightly. Five dissolves were needed to join the shots into what otherwise resembles a single continuous take.

Lemon is dedicated to artist Robert Huot. Frampton had discussed James Joyce's 1922 novel Ulysses with Huot and told him about a statistical study performed on the text by noted linguist George Zipf. He said an unusually large number of hapax legomena appeared in it, such as the word lemon appearing in a mention of lemon plait (a slight inaccuracy, as Joyce's novel contains the word 'lemon' dozens of times, but only mentions 'lemon plait' once at the beginning of Episode 4). Huot proposed that Joyce had begun with the set of words that were used only once and then added language surrounding them. Frampton considered Lemon "a film that points toward painting", so he included a prominent dedication to Huot, remembering Huot's explanation as a painter's conception of working in a different medium.

== Release and legacy ==
Frampton was financially successful with Lemon, in part because of the low cost to produce the film. In a review for the Chicago Reader, Fred Camper called the film "elegant and humorous", comparing the lighting effects to lunar phases. It has become one of Frampton's most famous films. Lemon was released for home media in 2012, as part of the Criterion Collection's A Hollis Frampton Odyssey on Blu-ray and DVD.

British artist Simon Martin has made reference to the film in his work. His 2010 Untitled, shown at the British Art Show, recreates Lemon as a digital animation. Martin's "Lemon 03 Generations (Turn It Around version)" used a projection of Lemon, reprocessed digitally to deliberately compromise the image quality. American game designer Evan Meaney adapted Lemon as the 2015 art game /le.mon: A remediation game, developed in Unity and WebGL.
