= Marion Faller =

American photographer

- Born: November 5, 1941
- Died: January 15, 2014 (aged 72)
- Occupation: Photographer

Marion Faller (November 5, 1941 – January 15, 2014) was an American photographer. Faller's work has been shown in a range of exhibitions and is held in various public collections.

== Life and work ==
Faller was born Marion Sudol in Passaic, New Jersey. She studied at Hunter College before earning a Masters of Fine Art from the University of Buffalo in the photographic studies program at Visual Studies Workshop. Eventually, she returned to the University of Buffalo, where she taught studio and history of photography courses from 1982 to 2006. In addition, she taught at Colgate University, Hunter College and Marymount Manhattan College. She often collaborated with her husband, experimental filmmaker Hollis Frampton, before his death in 1984. In later years, her photographs focused on the ways in which regular people, often New Yorkers, reflect their identities in inventive displays in and around their domestic spaces.

Faller's major series were Hey Baby, Take My Picture (1972–1975); Second Flora (1977–1979); Vegetable Locomotion (1978); False Impressions (1979); Time Capsule (1979–81) and Neither Nor (1988).

In describing her artistic career, she said:

“My work is about how individuals and communities visually express their values, their interests, and their sense of what is important and beautiful. The subject matter is usually close to home—homes, yards, small businesses and community buildings such as schools or churches. While much of my photography addresses the various ways we celebrate holidays and respond to the changing seasons, I've been photographing flags and other patriotic displays since October 2001. I am trying to document both the ordinary and the extraordinarily inventive ways people are approaching the ritual of displaying the flag— following established traditions and creating new ones. Most of my photographs were made in New York (where I’ve spent most of my adult life) and in New Jersey (where I grew up)."

Hollis Frampton said of Faller's work that it is "ambitious: aesthetically, philosophically, politically. … Best of all, the wit and grace with which it is joined make her work entirely unique." Gina Murtagh praised her "flexibility in charting the quirks of human nature…"

In 2002, she participated in the online project "Flagging Spirits", hosted by the University of Massachusetts.

Faller acted as a juror for Light Work, Central New York Photography Grants, in 1990. She also acted as a panelist for the New York State Council on the Arts (NYSCA) between 1981 and 1985. Faller continued her work with the NYSCA, serving as vice-chair between 1982 and 1983 and chair to the Guidelines Committee in between 1984 and 1985. She was a founding member of Everson Museum of Art in Syracuse New York, and of Soho Photo Gallery.

She was a member of Society for Photographic Education and was a gallery artist of Visual Studies Workshop Gallery.

== Solo exhibitions ==
- Pyramid Arts Center
- Fenimore Art Museum
- Menschel Photography Gallery

== Awards ==
- New York Foundation for the Arts fellowship
- CEPA Gallery (Center for Electronic and Photographic Arts) fellowship
- Light Work fellowship
- 1977: Creative Artist Public Service Program Photographers Fellowship

== Collections ==
Faller's work is held in the following public collections:

- Burchfield Penney Art Center
- George Eastman House
- Walker Art Center
- Visual Studies Workshop
- Light Work
- Fenimore Art Museum
- Albright-Knox Art Gallery
- Castellani Art Museum of Niagara University
- Buffalo Seminary
- National Gallery of Canada
- Addison Gallery of American Art
