= Paul Friedrich (linguist) =

American linguist and anthropologist (1927–2016)

Paul William Friedrich (October 22, 1927 – August 11, 2016) was an American anthropologist, linguist, poet, and Professor of Social Thought at the University of Chicago.

== Early life and education ==
Paul Friedrich was born in Cambridge, Massachusetts to parents Lenore Pelham and political theorist Carl J. Friedrich. His father was a professor of government at Harvard University from 1926 to 1971 and became the president of the American Political Science Association in 1962.

Friedrich initially studied at Williams College in 1945 but left to join the U.S. army in 1946. Stationed in Germany, Friedrich used his linguist skills as an interrogator. He returned to the U.S. and completed his bachelor's degree at Harvard College in 1951. That same year he received his M.A. in Russian from Harvard working with prominent Russian linguist Roman Jakobson. Friedrich received his Ph.D. from Yale in 1957 under the supervision of Sidney Mintz.

== Career ==
Friedrich had two daughters with his first wife Lore Bucher Friedrich, Maria and Susan who later became filmmaker Su Friedrich. In 1955 Friedrich took his wife and young daughters with him to research in the Mexican state of Michoacán. His cultural anthropology work with the Purépecha people led to his best known works, Agrarian Revolt in a Mexican Village (1970; 1977) and The Princes of Naranja: An Essay in Anthrohistorical Method (1987). Both ethnographic works describe indigenous politics and opposition in the region. His works The Tarascan Suffixes of Locative Space: Meaning and Morphotactics (1971) and A Phonology of Tarascan (1973) were among the most detailed as well as earliest modern linguistics of the Purépecha language.

Friedrich returned to Michoacán in the mid-1960s for further study with his second wife material culture specialist Margaret Hardin.

Friedrich's first academic job was as an assistant professor at the University of Pennsylvania from 1959 to 1962. In 1963 Friedrich joined the University of Chicago's Anthropology department where he taught as an associate professor until 1967 and then as professor, achieving emeritus status in 1996. He was awarded the university's Award for Excellence in Graduate Teaching in 1999.

In 2005, his former students honored him with a festschrift titled Language, Culture and the Individual: A Tribute to Paul Friedrich. In 2007 Yale University awarded Friedrich with the Wilbur Cross Medal. A prolific poet, he also published seven collections of poems, some of them focusing on the haiku form.

== Selected publications ==
- Proto-Indo-European Trees (1970)
- Agrarian Revolt in a Mexican Village (1977)
- The Meaning of Aphrodite (1978)
- The Language Parallax. Linguistics, Relativism and Poetic Creativity (1986)
- Music in Russian Poetry (1998)

=== Poetry ===
- From Root to Flower: Selected Poems (2006)
- Handholds: Haiku (2009)
- a goldfish instant: Concord to India haikus (2010)
