= Sink or Swim (1990 film) =

- Directed by: Su Friedrich
- Written by: Su Friedrich
- Narrated by: Jessica Meyerson
- Release date: 1990
- Running time: 48 minutes
- Country: United States
- Language: English

Sink or Swim is an experimental film written and directed by Su Friedrich originally released in 1990.

== Summary ==
Through a series of twenty six short stories, Sink or Swim describes the childhood events that shaped a girl's ideas about fatherhood, family relations, work and play. As the stories unfold, a dual portrait emerges: that of a father who cared more for his career than for his family, and of a daughter who was deeply affected by his behavior. Working in counterpoint to the forceful text are sensual black and white images that depict both the extraordinary and ordinary events of daily life. Together, they create a formally complex and emotionally intense film.

== Background ==
The film's title comes from an incident from Friedrich's childhood when her father taught her to swim by throwing her in the water after explaining the science behind swimming.

== Legacy ==
In 2015, the film was selected for preservation in the United States National Film Registry by the Library of Congress as being "culturally, historically, or aesthetically significant".
