= Frank Kuenstler =

American poet and filmmaker

Frank Kuenstler (1928–1996) was a New York poet and filmmaker. His work appeared in The Nation, the Village Voice, Film Culture, and in such anthologies as Mixed Voices and America: A Prophecy. Lens first appeared in Film Culture No. 33 (Summer 1964). He taught at the School of Visual Arts, edited Bread and Airplane, and was one of the animating spirits of Eventorium, an arts collective on Manhattan’s upper west side.

Audio tapes of two readings can be heard at PennSound . Anthology Film Archives houses the archive of films.

His last two books, In Which and The Seafarer, B.Q.E., and Other Poems, are available from Cairn Editions.

== Literary works ==
- Lens (1964)
- Selected Poems (1964)
- Paradise News (1966)
- Fugitives. Rounds (1966)
- 13½ Poems (1984)
- Continued (1987)
- Miscellany (1987)
- In Which (1994)
- The Seafarer, B.Q.E., and Other Poems (1996)

== Film works ==
His films include

- Color Idioms
- El Atlantis
