= Carriage Trade =

- Directed by: Warren Sonbert
- Release date: 1971
- Running time: 61 minutes
- Country: United States
- Language: Silent

Carriage Trade is a 1971 American experimental film directed by Warren Sonbert.

== Production ==
Carriage Trade was filmed over the course of six years as Sonbert brought a Bolex 16 mm camera with him on international trips. According to his program notes, the filming locations were Afghanistan, Egypt, France, Greece, India, Iran, Italy, Morocco, Nepal, Switzerland, Tunisia, Turkey, the United Kingdom, and the United States.

Early titles for the film were The Tuxedo Theatre, The Bad and the Beautiful, and Tonight and Every Night.

== Style ==
The film marked a major shift in Sonbert's filmmaking. Unlike his earlier short films, which are loosely narrative works that used longer takes, Carriage Trade is a montage work built out of shorter shots.

== Release ==
A 20-minute early cut of the footage from Carriage Trade, then known as The Tuxedo Theatre, was shown at the Jewish Museum in New York on February 11, 1969. Sonbert screened a longer 80-minute cut in London and New York. He edited that down to a final 61-minute version which has become the most widely distributed version. It premiered in 1971 as part of the Museum of Modern Art's Cineprobe series. The Whitney Museum screened it in 1973 as part of its New American Filmmakers series.

Carriage Trade is now part of Anthology Film Archives' Essential Cinema Repertory collection.

== Critical reception ==
For The New York Times, critic A. H. Weiler wrote that it "makes for a slightly dizzying but colorful and far-ranging trip, [but] it also illustrates the talents of an acutely perceptive and artistic film maker."
