= Dwinell Grant =

American artist (1912–1991)

- Born: Clarence Dwinell Grant; 1912; Springfield, Ohio
- Died: May 2, 1991 (aged 78–79); Doylestown, Pennsylvania
- Movement: abstraction, media art, nonobjectivism

Clarence Dwinell Grant (1912 - May 2, 1991) was an American visual artist known for his pioneering contributions to the field of art film.

== Biography ==
Grant began studying landscape painting at an early age with his grandfather Paul Emilio Henking. In 1931, he enrolled at the Dayton Art Institute, where he first was exposed to modernism and abstraction. One year later, he moved to New York, entering the National Academy of Design in 1933.

In 1935, he became an instructor in art and dramatics at Wittenberg College in Ohio. He had little time to paint, but found that working with student dramatics provided a create outlet for his innovative ideas. Although Grant's avant-garde ideas brought some criticism at Wittenberg, colleagues at the Dayton Art Institute encouraged his work. On their suggestion, he wrote to Hilla Rebay at the Guggenheim Foundation, who provided him with ongoing support.

Between 1938 and 1941, Grant made several experimental films, including the animated production "Contrathemis." In 1938, he had his first solo exhibit, at the Dayton Art Institute, and in 1940, he had a one-man show at the Guggenheim. His short, silent animated artworks strongly influenced experimental filmmaking in the following decades.

In 1942, Grant began working for a film company, and made navy training films during World War II. He later worked creating scientific illustration and making films for the medical profession. As his professional career began to take precedence, he exhibited his private creative work only on rare occasions.

His work is in the permanent collections of numerous museums, including the Metropolitan Museum of Art, the Guggenheim, and the Smithsonian American Art Museum.
