= Su Friedrich =

American filmmaker (born 1954)

- Born: December 12, 1954 (age 71); New Haven, Connecticut
- Years active: 1978–present
- Website: sufriedrich.com

Su Friedrich (born December 12, 1954) is an American avant-garde film director, producer, writer, and cinematographer. She has been a leading figure in avant-garde filmmaking and a pivotal force in the establishment of Queer Cinema. Friedrich has produced and directed twenty-seven films and videos.

She is the daughter of American linguist Paul Friedrich.

== Early life and family ==
Su Friedrich was born in 1954 in New Haven, Connecticut. Her mother was German and came to the US with Friedrich's father, Paul Friedrich who was in Germany as an American GI at the time. Friedrich attended the University of Chicago (1971–72) and Oberlin College (1972–1975) from which she earned a B.A. in Art and Art History. She lives and works in Brooklyn, NY, and from 1998 until 2023 was a Professor of Visual Art in the Lewis Center for the Arts at Princeton University, where she has taught film and video production. She made her first film, Hot Water, in 1978.

Friedrich's paternal grandfather was German-American political theorist Carl Joachim Friedrich. Her paternal great-grandfather was the inventor of the surgical rubber glove, professor of medicine Paul Leopold Friedrich, and her paternal great-grandmother a Prussian countess of the von Bülow family.

== Career ==
Friedrich's films regularly combine elements of narrative, documentary, and experimental styles of film-making and often focus on the roles of women, family, and homosexuality in contemporary America. From the onset of her career in the late 1970s, Friedrich has been a leading figure in avant-garde filmmaking and a pivotal force in the establishment of Queer Cinema. Her work has radicalized film form and content by incorporating a feminist perspective and issues of lesbian identity and by creating a remarkable and innovative synthesis of experimental, narrative and documentary genres. Friedrich's films are multi-lingual, moving between the personal and the political, from autobiographical films about family to the investigation of society's notions of sexual identity. Her cinematic palette includes home movies, archival footage, interviews, and scripted narratives.

Friedrich is the recipient of the Cal Arts Alpert Award in the Arts and has received fellowships from the Rockefeller Foundation and John Simon Guggenheim Memorial Foundation, as well as numerous grants from the New York State Council on the Arts, the New York Foundation for the Arts, Independent Television Service, and the Jerome Foundation. Her films and videos are widely screened in the US, Canada, and Europe, and have been the subject of 31 retrospectives, including at the Whitney Museum of American Art, the Rotterdam International Film Festival, The Stadtkino in Vienna, the Pacific Cinematheque in Vancouver, and the National Film Theater in London. Friedrich's work is part of the collection at the Museum of Modern Art, the Art Institute of Chicago, the Royal Film Archive of Belgium, the Centre Pompidou in Paris, and the National Library of Australia. Her complete original film materials are being conserved at the Academy of Motion Picture Arts and Sciences Film Archive in Los Angeles.

Friedrich's films have won many awards, including: for The Odds of Recovery, Best Documentary at Identities Festival in Vienna; for Hide and Seek, Best Narrative Film Award at the Athens International Film Festival, Outstanding Documentary Feature at Outfest '97 in Los Angeles, Special Jury Award at the New York Gay & Lesbian Film Festival and Juror's Choice Award at the Charlotte Film Festival; for Sink or Swim, Grand Prix at the Melbourne Film Festival, the Golden Gate Award at the San Francisco International Film Festival, Gold Juror's Choice Award at the Charlotte Film and Video Festival, Special Jury Award at the Atlanta Film Festival and Best Experimental Film Award at the USA Short Film and Video Festival; for Damned If You Don't, Best Experimental Film Award at the Athens Film Festival and Best Experimental Narrative Award at the Atlanta Film Festival; and for Cool Hands, Warm Heart, Special Merit Award at the Athens Film Festival. Friedrich also won the Peter S. Reed Lifetime Achievement Award in 2000.

The films have been reviewed in numerous publications, including Variety, Premiere, The Village Voice, Artforum, The New York Times, The Nation, Film Quarterly, The Millennium Film Journal, Film Comment, Sight and Sound, Flash Art, Cineaste, The Independent, Heresies Art Journal, Afterimage, and The L.A. Weekly. Essays on her work as well as excerpts from her scripts have appeared in numerous books, including Women's Experimental Cinema (2007), 501 Movie Directors (2007), Contemporary American Independent Film: From the Margins to the Mainstream (2005), Visionary Film: The American Avant-Garde, 1943–2000 (2002), Left In the Dark (2002), The Wedding Complex: Forms of Belonging in Modern American Culture (2002), Girl Director: A How-To Guide (2001), Collecting Visible Evidence (1999), Experimental Ethnography (1999), The New American Cinema (1998), Play It Again, Sam (1998), Film Fatales (1998), Cinematernity (1996), Screen Writings (1994), Women's Films (1994), Queer Looks (1993), Avant-Garde Film: Motion Studies (1993), Vampires and Violets (1992), and Critical Cinema: Volume Two (1992).

The moving image collection of Su Friedrich is held at the Academy Film Archive. The archive has preserved Cool Hands, Warm Heart, Damned if You Don't, and Sink or Swim.

== Filmography ==
Year	Title	Length	Format	Color	Sound
1978	Hot Water	12min.	super-8	b&w	sound
1979	Cool Hands, Warm Heart	16min.	16mm	b&w	silent
1979	Scar Tissue	6min.	16mm	b&w	silent
1981	Gently Down the Stream	14min.	16mm	b&w	silent
1982	But No One	9min.	16mm	b&w	silent
1985	The Ties That Bind	55min.	16mm	b&w	sound
1987	Damned If You Don't	42min.	16mm	b&w	sound
1990	Sink or Swim	48min.	16mm	b&w	sound
1991	First Comes Love	22min.	16mm	b&w	sound
1993	Rules of the Road	31min.	16mm	color	sound
1993	Lesbian Avengers Eat Fire, Too	60min.	video	color	sound
1996	Hide and Seek	65min.	16mm	b&w	sound
2002	The Odds of Recovery	65min.	16mm	color	sound
2004	The Head of a Pin	21min.	video	color	sound
2005	Seeing Red	27min.	video	color	sound
2008	From the Ground Up	54min.	video	color	sound
2012	Practice Makes Perfect	12min.	video	color	sound
2012	Gut Renovation	81min.	video	color	sound
2013	Queen Takes Pawn	6.5min.	video	color	sound
2016	I Cannot Tell You How I Feel	42min.	video	color	sound
2018	Edited by: The Companion Film, version 1	76min.	video	b&w and color	sound
2019	Edited by: The Companion Film, version 2	113min.	video	b&w and color	sound
2020	Cinetracts 5/10/20	2min.	video	color	sound
2022	Today	57min.	video	color	sound

=== Gently Down the Stream ===
The short film consists of texts and rephotographed imagery, which both represents Friedrich's fourteen dreams that are taken from eight years of her journals. Imagery of the Virgin Mary and Christ, a woman rowing a machine in gym, another woman swimming in pool, and body of water are presented with a hand-scratched word at a time, and pulled audience in Friedrich's flow of consciousness in the process to reconstruct and analyze her dream.

=== The Ties That Bind ===
The Ties That Bind is an experimental documentary about the filmmaker’s mother, who was born and lived in southern Germany from 1920-1950. Through a mixture of personal anecdote and social history, she describes the rise of Nazism, the war years, and the Allied occupation, during which she met her future husband, an American soldier. As the title of the film suggests, it depicts the ties that lie between the past and present, between mother and daughter.

=== Damned If You Don’t ===
Damned If You Don’t is about Catholicism and lesbianism, particularly the sexuality of nuns. The narrative in the film has three layers in its structure; a young woman seducing a young nun; adaptation of Powell and Pressburger's film, Black Narcissus (1947) that is about a nun in the convent in Himalayas; reading of Judith C. Brown's Immodest Acts: The Life of a Lesbian Nun in Renaissance Italy. By exploiting the layered narratives, Damned If You Don’t reveals a common assumption in melodrama that all desire is heterosexual, and shows a new direction of depiction of female desire, pleasure and sexuality.

=== Sink or Swim ===
Through a series of twenty six short stories, Sink or Swim describes the childhood events that shaped a girl's ideas about fatherhood, family relations, work and play. As the stories unfold, a dual portrait emerges: that of a father who cared more for his career than for his family, and of a daughter who was deeply affected by his behavior. Working in counterpoint to the forceful text are sensual black and white images that depict both the extraordinary and ordinary events of daily life.

In 2015, the United States Library of Congress selected Sink or Swim for preservation in the National Film Registry, finding it "culturally, historically, or aesthetically significant".

=== Hide and Seek ===
Hide and Seek is an exploration into lesbian adolescence in the 1960s. Lou is a 12-year-old girl who daydreams in a tree house, tries not to watch a sex education film, wins a rock throwing contest, and is horrified to discover that her best friend is taking an interest in earrings and boys. Interwoven with Lou's story are the mostly hilarious, sometimes painful recollections of adult lesbians who try to figure out how they ever got from there to here. Completing the picture are clips from a wide array of old scientific and educational films blended with the black and white images of Lou's world.

=== From the Ground Up ===
Friedrich's work has always used personal narrative to support strong political beliefs. With her recent movie From the Ground Up she follows the coffee road from bean to purchased brew, in a quest to understand how the cup of coffee [she'd] just gotten at the pushcart could cost only fifty cents. Beginning with the farmers in the Guatemalan countryside, we follow the bean from the exporter in Guatemala City, to the importer in Charleston, SC, then on to the roaster in Queens before it ends up in the Manhattan pushcart. Rather than make a traditional social documentary, Friedrich made a film that echoed her own experience, which was that of being stunned by the unimaginable scale and complexity of the coffee industry and the often grueling physical labor required to get those seedling to eventually yield a cup of coffee. During the making of the film Friedrich became a supporter of the fair trade coffee movement, and dedicated the film to the movement and the people involved.

=== Gut Renovation ===
Documentary about the gentrification of Williamsburg, Brooklyn and the displacement of long-term businesses and residents.

== See also ==
- List of female film and television directors
- List of lesbian filmmakers
- List of LGBT-related films directed by women
- Women's cinema
