= Hapax Legomena =

Seven-part film cycle by Hollis Frampton

- Directed by: Hollis Frampton
- Release dates: 1971; 1972
- Country: United States
- Language: English

Hapax Legomena is a seven-part film cycle by American experimental filmmaker Hollis Frampton. The complete cycle premiered in November 1972.

== Production ==
Nostalgia, Critical Mass, and Travelling Matte were the first three of the films to be completed. Frampton began to see them as "a single continuous effort" and, by late 1971, said he "was entirely clear about what was to be done." He considered Hapax Legomena "a single work composed of detachable parts, each of which may be seen separately for its own qualities."

The cycle's title refers to hapax legomenon, a word that appears precisely once in a text corpus. Frampton was interested in the problem that their meaning can be difficult to determine because their context is limited to a single appearance. Frampton had made reference to the phenomenon through his earlier short film Lemon, whose title is a hapax legomenon in James Joyce's novel Ulysses. He originally proposed using Hapax Legomena as the title for a collection of short poems before settling on it for the cycle of films.

== Works ==
=== Nostalgia ===
In Nostalgia, still photographs taken by Frampton are slowly burned on a hot plate. Michael Snow reads personal comments by Frampton; however, the images are shifted such that photographs he discusses appear after the corresponding narration.

=== Poetic Justice ===
Poetic Justice shows a stack of papers, on a table next to a plant and a cup of coffee. Page after page is placed on top of each other, forming a script that tells a surreal story. At the suggestion of Nathan and Joan Lyons, Frampton published it as a book.

=== Critical Mass ===
Critical Mass shows a domestic argument between two characters. It begins with a dark screen and only audio, leading into the main section where the image track is fixed-length segments that partially repeat over each other and the sound track is edited to move in and out of sync with the image. The film was Frampton's first time working with actors. He cast Barbara DiBenedetto and Frank Albetta from Binghamton University as the couple and had them improvise based on a premise he wrote. They shot it in a single take. The film's title comes from critical mass, the smallest amount of nuclear fuel needed to sustain a chain reaction.

=== Travelling Matte ===
Travelling Matte began as video of Binghamton University that Frampton shot on a Portapak. He refilmed the footage on a television, manipulating the image with his hand between the camera and the screen. The film's title refers to a travelling matte, a filmmaking technique where a changing shape is used to merge more than one image.

=== Ordinary Matter ===
Ordinary Matter shows moving images of landscapes and monuments. Frampton shot much of the footage during a trip to England. For the film's soundtrack, he read through the Chinese syllables in a Wade–Giles table, but without intonation. Its title comes from ordinary matter, matter that makes up nearly all the observable universe.

=== Remote Control ===
Remote Control is divided into five sections, each of which uses the same 100-foot reel as its source footage. Frampton filmed television broadcasts one frame at a time whenever the shot changed or panned. The five sections modify the footage in different ways and use different schematizations for displaying numbers from 0 to 40.

=== Special Effects ===
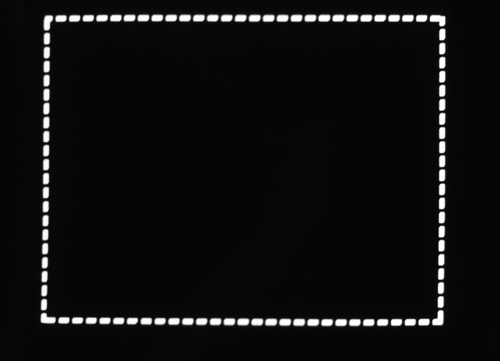
A frame from Special Effects (1972)

Special Effects shows only a white dotted outline of a rectangle which moves around a black background. It is accompanied by a synthesized soundtrack. Frampton created the film by shooting a static image from a distance with a handheld telephoto lens, such that the slight tremor of his body is rendered as the motion of the rectangle.

== Themes ==
Several works in Hapax Legomena deal with other visual media related to film. Nostalgia and Poetic Justice include stories about photography, and the latter is presented in a form similar to a screenplay. Travelling Matte shows the transfer of video to film, and Remote Control transfers television images to film.

Frampton noted that the cycle contains autobiographical elements. Nostalgia is the most explicitly autobiographical, containing several stories from his own life. He separated from his wife after its completion, and the second and third films in the cycle discuss sexual jealousy and relationship struggles.

== Reception and legacy ==
The complete Hapax Legomena cycle premiered in November 1972 at the Walker Art Center. It was shown in London as part of the International Festival of Independent Avant-Garde Film in 1973. Nostalgia (eventually inducted into the National Film Registry in 2003) and Critical Mass were the most commercially successful films from the cycle.

Bill Brand supervised a restoration of the films in 2009, supported through Anthology Film Archives, the National Film Preservation Foundation, the Museum of Modern Art, and the New York University Moving Image Archiving and Preservation Program. The first three films in Hapax Legomena—Nostalgia, Poetic Justice, and Critical Mass—were released on home media in 2012 as part of the Criterion Collection's A Hollis Frampton Odyssey.

== Sources ==
- MacDonald, Scott (2015). Binghamton Babylon: Voices from the Cinema Department, 1967–1977. State University of New York Press. ISBN 978-1-4384-5889-2.
- Sitney, P. Adams (2002). Visionary Film: The American Avant-Garde, 1943–2000. Oxford University Press. ISBN 978-0-19-514886-2.
- Sitney, P. Adams (2008). Eyes Upside Down: Visionary Filmmakers and the Heritage of Emerson. Oxford University Press. pp. 105–120. ISBN 978-0-19-533114-1.
- Zryd, Michael (2023). Hollis Frampton: Navigating the Infinite Cinema. Columbia University Press. ISBN 978-0-231-20157-5.
