= Hollis Frampton =

American filmmaker, photographer (1936–1984)

- Born: Hollis William Frampton Jr. March 11, 1936; Wooster, Ohio, U.S.
- Died: March 30, 1984 (aged 48); Buffalo, New York, U.S.
- Occupations: Artist, filmmaker, writer, photographer.
- Notable work: Zorns Lemma; Lemon; Hapax Legomena
- Spouse(s): Marcia Steinbrecher (m. 1966; div. 1974) Marion Faller (before 1984)

Hollis William Frampton Jr. (March 11, 1936 – March 30, 1984) was an American avant-garde filmmaker, photographer, writer, theoretician, and pioneer of digital art. He was best known for his innovative and non-linear structural films that defined the movement, including Lemon (1969), Zorns Lemma (1970), and Hapax Legomena (1971–1972), as well as his anthology book, Circles of Confusion: Film, Photography, Video: Texts, 1968–1980 (1983).

== Background ==
=== Early life ===
Hollis William Frampton Jr. was born on March 11, 1936, in Wooster, Ohio, to Nellie Cross Frampton and Hollis William Frampton. An only child, he was raised primarily by his maternal grandparents, John and Fanny Cross. Fanny Cross is the subject of Frampton's 1979 film Gloria!. He grew up in Cleveland from the age of ten, and five years later, he entered Phillips Academy in Andover, Massachusetts, where he was accepted on full scholarship. His classmates and friends included the painter Frank Stella and sculptor Carl Andre. Well read as a youth, he had a reputation at Andover as a "young genius". He failed to graduate from Andover, and thus forfeited a National Scholarship to Harvard University. He failed his final History exam on a bet that he could pass without ever reading the textbook. Entering Western Reserve University in 1954, Frampton took a variety of classes (Latin, Greek, German, French, Russian, Sanskrit, Chinese, mathematics) but had not declared a major. He recounted that when he was called in front of the dean after three and a half years of study and 135 hours of credits and asked, once again, if he intended to take a degree, he was told that if so, he needed to take speech, western civilization, and music appreciation. He replied that "I already know how to talk, I already know who Napoleon was and I already like music" and noted that "For that reason I hold no bachelor's degree. I was very sick of school." During this time he had a short-lived radio show on WOBC at Oberlin College.

In 1956, Frampton began correspondence with Ezra Pound after becoming interested in the literary generation of the 1880s. In the fall of 1957, he moved to Washington, D.C. where he visited Ezra Pound almost daily at St. Elizabeth's hospital where Pound was finishing part of his Cantos. There, Frampton writes that he was "privy to a most meaningful exposition of the poetic process by an authentic member of the 'generation of the '80's.' At the same time, I came to understand that I was not a poet." Early the next year, Frampton moved to New York. He renewed his friendships with Andre and Stella, sharing an apartment first with the two of them and then with Andre only. He began photographing artist friends; early projects included documentation of Andre's work, The Secret World of Frank Stella 1958–1962, and portraits of artists such as Larry Poons and James Rosenquist.

In 1973, Frampton joined the faculty of the University of Buffalo.

While at UB, Frampton collaborated with media artist Woody Vasulka in establishing the Digital Arts Lab at UB, which, according to the university website, was "the first US academic program dedicated to digital arts." This same profile mentions that he was one of the pioneers in exploring audio and visual digital media, programming computer software and designing hardware for art production.

At Buffalo, Frampton taught filmmaking, film theory, sound, video, and digital arts in the Department of Media Study from 1973 until his death in 1984. His work at UB also connected experimental film with early digital and electronic media, since UB was an important early site for new media and digital arts.

=== Family ===
Hollis Frampton married Marcia Steinbrecher in September 1966. The couple separated in 1971 and divorced in 1974. He later married Marion Faller, a photographer whom he had met and began living with in early 1971. They lived in Buffalo and Eaton, New York. Together, Frampton and Faller collaborated on several series, including "Vegetable Locomotion" and "False Impressions". Frampton had a stepson by Faller named Will.

=== Death and legacy ===
Frampton died from lung cancer at his Buffalo residence on March 30, 1984, at the age of 48. His 1971 film (nostalgia) was inducted into the National Film Registry in 2003.

== Film ==
As Frampton's photography moved toward exploring ideas of series and sets, he began to make films. He based a lot of his early films on concepts. All of his very early works were either discarded or lost. His earliest surviving work is Information (1966). His early works were reasonably simple in construction. A few of them, including Maxwell's Demon, Surface Tension, and Prince Rupert's Drops, were based on concepts from science. His films gradually increased in scope and ambition. He was seen as a structural filmmaker, working in a style that focused on the nature of film itself. In an interview with Robert Gardner, he stated a discomfort with that term because it was too broad and didn't accurately reflect the nature of his work. Autumnal Equinox (1974) was shot inside a meat-packing plant, and shot using 30 mm film that contained bovine jelly.

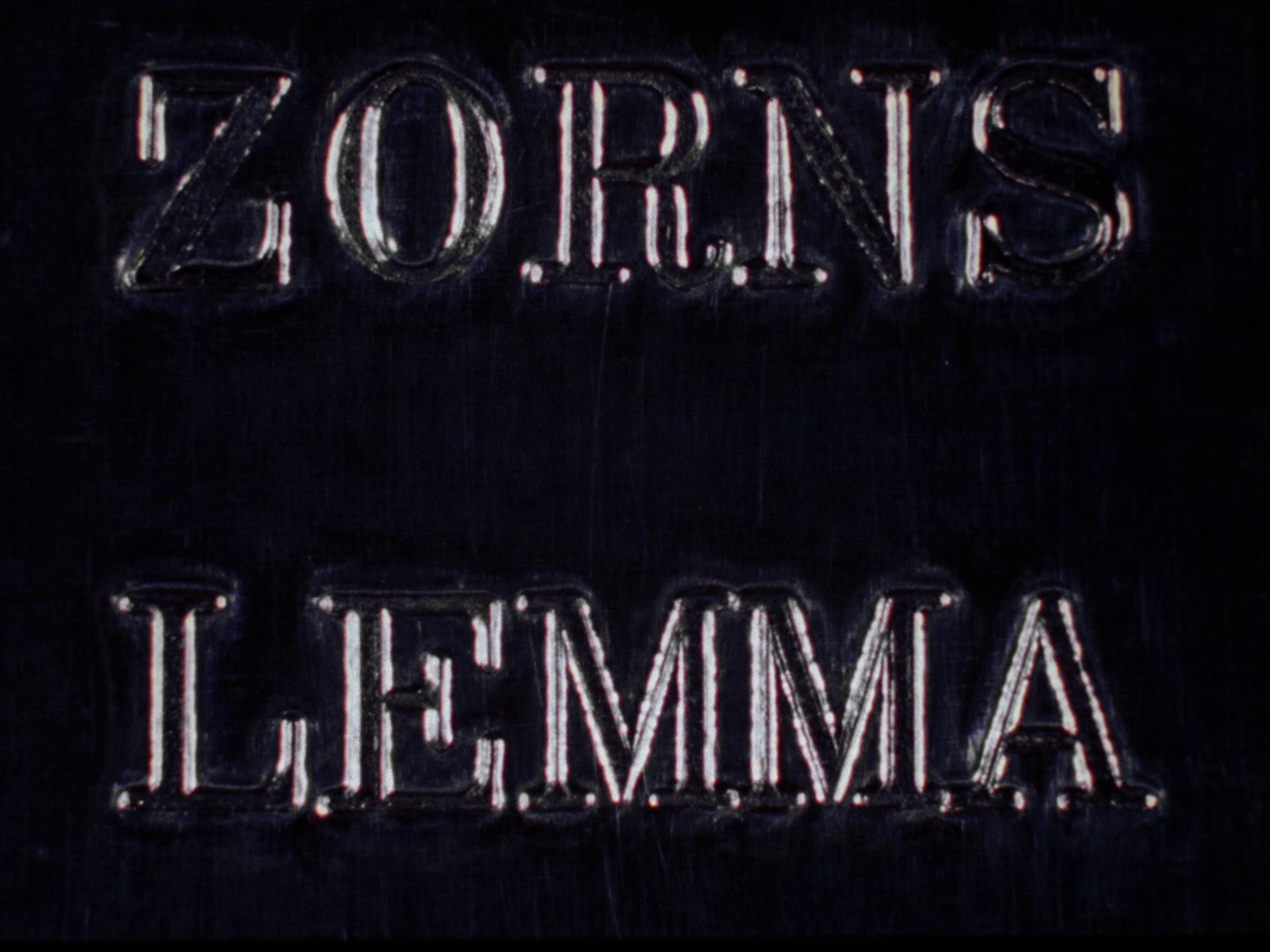
Zorns Lemma (1970)

His most significant work is arguably Zorns Lemma (1970), a film which drastically altered perceptions towards experimental film at the time. It is formed in three different sections. The first is a reading (by Joyce Wieland) of the Bay State Primer, a Puritan work for children to learn the alphabet. The sentences used had foreboding themes such as "In Adam's fall, we sinned all." The second section is based on a text-based work by Carl Andre, which started out with an alphabetical list of words for each letter in the alphabet. Each subsequent list is replaced with a letter until it is just letters. In Zorns Lemma, the concept is reversed. It starts off with a twenty-four-letter alphabet (I/J and U/V are considered one letter), each letter shown for one second of screen time and then looping. The second cycle replaces each letter with a word that starts with each letter. Gradually, the word stills are replaced by an active film shot, such as washing hands or peeling a tangerine until there are only moving images. The third section contains a seemingly single shot of a couple walking across a snowy meadow. The sound is of six women reading one word at a time from Theory of Light. One interpretation of Zorns Lemma was that it was a comment on life's stages, the morality of the Bay State Primer being childhood, the sets of numbers representing maturing and interaction with the world, and the third part representing old age and death.

After Zorns Lemma, he made the Hapax Legomena films, a series of seven films, of which (nostalgia) is the most well known. Several of these films explored the relation between sound and cinema, an area often disregarded in American avant-garde film, by demonstrating a disjointed relationship between the two. Poetic Justice explores a "cinema of the mind", wherein the film takes place in the viewers' imagination(s) as they read title cards. An extremely rare artist book edition of Poetic Justice was printed by the Visual Studies Workshop. His final major film project was a monumental project called Magellan, named after the explorer who first circumnavigated the world. Magellan was intended to be shown as a calendrical cycle, one film for each day of the year. One film from the cycle, Magellan: Drafts and Fragments, is exemplary of Frampton's ambition to create a personal "meta-history" of film; in Drafts and Fragments, he remade the cinema of the Lumieres in 51 1-minute films.

The last few years of his life, Frampton taught at SUNY Buffalo, writing, working on Magellan and ongoing photographic projects with fellow artist and wife Marion Faller, and investigating the relationship between computers and art. He did some initial work with video and sound reproducing with an IMSAI 8080 computer.

According to Harvard Film Archive, the subsequent activities of Hollis Frampton extended from structural films to video art and computer-generated, computer-controlled, and computer-processed imagery, audio and text. The same is confirmed by their description of the collection, which also mentions Frampton's creation of programming software at an early stage of computer art development.

Film study, restoration and print availability through Filmmakers Co-op NY, Anthology Film Archives and NY MoMA. Much of Frampton's work was released by the Criterion Collection on April 26, 2012, as special edition Blu-ray Disc and DVD. His archive is maintained by Anthology Film Archives and the Harvard Film Archive.

== Filmography ==
- Clouds Like White Sheep (1962) 25 min 16mm (reported destroyed)
- A Running Man (1963) 22 min 16mm (reported destroyed)
- Ten Mile Poem (1964) 33 min 16mm (reported destroyed)
- Obelisk Ampersand Encounter (1965) 1:30 min 16mm (reported lost)
- Information (1966) 4 min 16mm
- Manual of Arms (1966) 17 min 16mm
- Process Red (1966) 3:30 min 16mm
- Heterodyne (1967) 7 min 16mm
- Maxwell's Demon (1968) 4 min 16mm
- Snowblind (1968) 5:30 min 16mm
- Surface Tension (1968) 10 min 16mm
- Artificial Light (1969) 25 min 16mm
- Carrots and Peas (1969) 5:30 min 16mm
- Lemon (1969) 7:30 min 16mm
- Palindrome (1969) 22 min 16mm
- Prince Rupert Drops (1969) 7 min 16mm
- Work and Days (1969) 12 mins 16mm
- States (1967, Revised 1970) 17:30 min 16mm
- Zorns Lemma (1970) 60 minutes 16mm
- Clouds of Magellan (1971) 16mm
- Critical Mass (1971) 25:30 min 16mm
- (nostalgia) (1971) 36 min 16mm
- Travelling Matte (1971) 33:30 min 16mm
- Appartus Sum (1972) 3 min 16mm
- Given: . . . (1972) 28 min 16mm
- Hapax Legomena (1971–1972) 3 hrs 22 min 16mm
- Ordinary Matter (1972) 36 min 16mm
- Poetic Justice (1972) 31:30 min 16mm
- Public Domain (1972) 18 min 16mm
- Remote Control (1972) 29 min 16mm
- Special Effects (1972) 10:30 min 16mm
- Tiger Balm (1972) 10 min 16mm
- Yellow Springs (1972) 5 min 16mm
- Less (1973) 1 sec 16mm
- Autumnal Equinox (Solariumagelani) (1974) 27 min 16mm
- Banner (1974) 40 sec 16mm
- INGENIVM NOBIS IPSA PVELLA FECIT (1974) 61:30 min 16mm
- Noctiluca (Magellan's Toys: #1) (1974) 3:30 min 16mm
- SOLARIUMAGELANI (1974) 92 min 16mm
- Straits of Magellan (1974) 51:15 min 16mm
- Summer Solstice (1974) 32 min 16mm
- Winter Solstice (1974) 33 min 16mm
- Drum (1975) 20 sec 16mm
- Pas de Trois (1975) 4 min 16mm
- For Georgia O'Keeffe (1976) 3:30 min 16mm
- Magellan: At the Gates of Death, Part I: The Red Gate (1976) 54 min 16mm
- A & B in Ontario (1984) 16 min
- "Magellan: Drafts and Fragments"
- "More Than Meets The Eye"
- "Otherwise Unexplained Fires"

== See also ==
- Tony Conrad
- Paul Sharits
- Ernie Gehr
- George Landow a.k.a. Owen Land
- Michael Snow, Canadian filmmaker and sculptor
