= Warren Sonbert =

American experimental filmmaker (1947–1995)

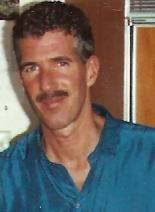
- Born: June 26, 1947; Brooklyn, New York, U.S.
- Died: May 31, 1995 (aged 47); San Francisco, California, U.S.
- Known for: Experimental film
- Notable work: Carriage Trade

Warren Sonbert (June 26, 1947 – May 31, 1995) was an American experimental filmmaker whose work of nearly three decades began in New York in the mid-1960s, and continued in San Francisco throughout the second half of his life. Known for the exuberant imagery of films such as Carriage Trade and especially for their intricate and innovative editing, he has been described as "the supreme Romantic diarist of the cinema" as well as "both a probing and playful artist and a keen intellect reveling in the interplay between all the creative arts."

"Critics have tried to pin down Sonbert's cinema with catchy formulations," wrote David Sterritt, but "his works are not really diary films, since their carefully shaped contours are determined more by aesthetic insight than daily experience, and to compare them with 'explosions in a postcard factory' is to acknowledge their boisterous variety while missing their ecstatic precision."

== Early films ==
A protégé of the avant-garde filmmaker Gregory J. Markopoulos but inspired by the work of Hollywood auteurs like Alfred Hitchcock and Douglas Sirk as well as by experimental cinema, Sonbert premiered his first, short films, to critical enthusiasm, in 1966 while a student at New York University. His first film, Amphetamine, featured a shock cut to two young men passionately embracing as the camera swooped around them in the youthful cinephile's homage to the 360-degree kiss in Hitchcock's Vertigo. The films that followed captured his friends at work and play, often in studios, galleries, or boutiques, and were frequently accompanied by rock songs of the recent period, whose energy added to the power of their rapid editing. In his second film, Where Did Our Love Go?, Sonbert said in 1967, "I used mostly old rock 'n roll—the saddest and most nostalgic music there is."

Roger Greenspun's review of a 1968 retrospective in New York began: "During the last weekend in January the Film Makers' Cinematheque offered a three-and-one-half-hour program consisting of the collected, but not quite complete, works of Warren Sonbert. The program's title, 'Introducing Warren Sonbert,' wasn't really accurate, because several of the films had been shown publicly before ... Sonbert now has a following, as the overflow crowds at the Cinematheque testify, and it seems more than likely that his films will be shown again. I think that anybody interested in the movies should see them, not because Sonbert is what's happening, but because he is so extraordinarily and consistently good. He is also highly enjoyable, fun to look at, apparently without a message but not without meaning."

== Carriage Trade and later films ==
Around 1968, Sonbert stopped using music, and began reediting his old and new images into a longer silent film that intercut many different kinds of footage taken in many different locales. "'Footage from 1967-1970' is the latest title Warren Sonbert has given his ever-growing, ever-changing film," reported Jonas Mekas in his "Movie Journal" in The Village Voice in 1970. "At earlier screenings it has been known as 'The Bad and the Beautiful' and 'Tonight and Every Night.' ... By now the short film of 20 minutes has grown to 80 minutes. What it is a Canto on People and Places. It is the first canto film I know ..." Phillip Lopate has related Sonbert's "suppression of the sound track" in this period to "his love for music, and his desire to give his visuals a 'musical' form"; Sonbert once likened the shots themselves to "notes, chords, or tone clusters."

Sonbert now moved to San Francisco, and his work in progress evolved into the hour-long Carriage Trade (1972), the film in which, as P. Adams Sitney has written, he "found the form that gave new meaning to his earlier work and defined his vocation." Intercutting footage shot with his 16mm Bolex during "travels over four continents in six years," Carriage Trade was the first in a two-decade succession of films with similarly radical montage, in which each cut was designed to open up multiple connections and associations. "From the first stunning cut, between building reflections in twin panes of glass and a distant waterfall that divides the frame similarly, the editing both expands the film's space and creates a variety of links between shots," wrote Fred Camper. "At times Sonbert tweaks the grandeur of his scenes (one magnificent image of Venice cuts to a pet puppy), but just as often he ennobles the ordinary (a man adjusting a woman's clothes becomes a flock of flamingos)."

"Carriage Trade reverses the usual relationship," Scott MacDonald pointed out. "The montage is the film ... Instead of embedding a montage within a narrative, Sonbert embeds shots that have at most minimal narrative elements within montage." Reviewing the 1976 Rude Awakening, Fred Camper asked: "Disconnected but rich, open and non-assertive: what kind of editing has Sonbert discovered? ... The particular result of Sonbert's form and shooting—the images he uses are fully as important as his editing—is an extraordinary kind of heightened seeing. While his photography is for the most part realistic, I never feel as if I am looking at 'real' objects, or 'real' colors. Instead, shape and color exist in a state of disassociated intensity. Colors, turning in on themselves, glow with an inner light. Often, the image becomes a kind of design in which subject and background are seen as parts of a whole decor, one whose elements seem to change each other by being held within that design."

While Carriage Trade is still sometimes considered his masterpiece (Sonbert himself once called it "my magnum opus"), the critic Paul Arthur has argued that "with every successive film the overall shape and rhythmical patterning shift in relation to a particular exploration of theme or set of motifs." In the late 1980s, Sonbert began again using music, but now it was often classical music, as in the final section of Friendly Witness (1989), which had its premiere at the New York Film Festival, as did Short Fuse (1992), with its even more diverse musical accompaniment whereby, Paul Arthur wrote, "the goal of creating a soundtrack that would not simply amplify or subvert themes already embedded in the images but operate semi-independently within a larger structure of meaning was finally realized." New York Times reviewer Stephen Holden noted that Short Fuse pictured "a world in which almost everybody is hard at play. Surfers, a basketball game, parades, hang-gliders, amusement park rides, Las Vegas casinos and all kinds of fun are shown ... But not all is frolic and joy. There are vintage film clips of air and sea battles from World War II [and] shots of violent demonstrations in San Francisco ... by the AIDS protest group Act Up ... The film expresses its political rage almost subliminally ... in contrasting the winning of World War II with the fight against AIDS ... that hasn't been won."

Sonbert taught filmmaking at the San Francisco Art Institute, the School of the Art Institute of Chicago, and Bard College at various times, and regularly reviewed classical recordings and opera, as well as film, for periodicals including The Advocate and the Bay Area Reporter (writing initially under the name "Scottie Ferguson," borrowed from the obsessed protagonist of Hitchcock's film set in San Francisco, Vertigo). During his career, there were retrospectives of his work at the Whitney Museum of American Art (1983), the Berlin International Film Festival (1987), the Centre Pompidou (1987), and the Museum of Modern Art (1994). In 1999, on the occasion of the Guggenheim Museum's presentation of all of his surviving films in versions restored by the Academy Film Archive, initiated by the Estate Project, Lisa Katzman observed in the New York Times that "the films of Sonbert's mature period seem to contain multiple worlds ... In his editing, the images took on a new life; uncoupled from literal meanings and quotidian contexts, they became notes or colors ... Like the Russian montage master Dziga Vertov, Sonbert saw film as a language, and his work demands to be read ... While it is not always possible to grasp the exact psychological or emotional nuance he had in mind while constructing his 'arguments,' as Sonbert once called his films, their sensual appeal can be overpowering." Retrospectives of his work have since been held at the San Francisco Museum of Modern Art (2000), the Centre Pompidou (2002), the Austrian Filmmuseum (2005), the Harvard Film Archive (2008), the Tate Modern (2013), and the Belgian Cinematek (2015).

== Death ==
It is not known when Sonbert first learned that he was HIV-positive. He died of complications from AIDS at his home in San Francisco in 1995. Two years later the New York Film Festival gave the premiere of his posthumous film, Whiplash, which had been completed according to his instructions by his former student Jeff Scher.

== Filmography ==
- Amphetamine (1966)
- Where Did Our Love Go? (1966)
- Hall of Mirrors (1966)
- The Bad and the Beautiful (1967)
- Truth Serum (1967)
- Holiday (1968)
- Carriage Trade (1972)
- Rude Awakening (1976)
- Divided Loyalties (1978)
- Noblesse Oblige (1981)
- A Woman's Touch (1983)
- The Cup and the Lip (1986)
- Honor and Obey (1988)
- Friendly Witness (1989)
- Short Fuse (1992)
- Whiplash (1995–97)
