= Peter Donebauer =

- Born: May 31, 1947 (age 79)
- Education: Manchester University; Royal College of Art, London
- Known for: Video art
- Notable work: 'Entering' (1974), part of the seven-part 'CreationCycle'
- Awards: Arts Council England, British Film Institute, Calouste Gulbenkian Foundation

Peter Donebauer (born 1947) is an English video artist best known for his video artwork 'Entering', part two of his seven-part 'Creation Cycle’, 1972–1978. He also designed and built the Videokalos video synthesizer.

== Life and work ==
Peter Donebauer studied at Manchester University and the Royal College of Art, London.

'Entering' was the first video artwork to be commissioned and nationally broadcast by the BBC. It was shown in the arts programme 'Second House' in 1974; the producer was Mark Kidel. It was created in real-time at the Royal College of Art television studio and transmitted via a live microwave link to Broadcasting House where it was recorded for later broadcast.

In 1975–76, Donebauer partnered with Richard Monkhouse to develop the Videokalos colour synthesizer. It decoded the video signal into its red, green and blue components allowing for complex mixing and interlayering of colours and images. The device allowed “video” to be “played live” like a musical instrument.

Utilising the Videokalos synthesiser, Donebauer founded the Video And Music Performers (VAMP) delivering live interactive performances created between video and music performers. VAMP toured the UK in 1978-79 and had a retrospective performance at Tate Britain in 2006.

Donebauer created other commissioned works within The Creation Cycle, including 'Struggling', a part of his Arts Council award produced in 1974, and three works commissioned by the British Film Institute: 'Circling' and 'Teeming' in 1975, and 'Dawn Creation' in 1976. In 1980 he produced 'Moving' for the Calouste Gulbenkian Foundation and in 1980-81 'The Water Cycle' for Thorn-EMI. Later works include the 'Mandala' Cycle, 1991, and 'Thames Reflections', 2003.

In 1981 he partnered with David Graham to found Diverse Production, producing political programming for the newly formed Channel 4.
