= Simon Martin (artist) =

English artist (born 1965)

Simon Martin (born 1965) is an English artist living and working in London, known for his video works.

== Early life ==
Martin was born in Cheshire, England, in 1965. He attended the Slade School of Fine Art, University College London, between 1985 and 1989.

== Career ==
In 2005, Martin showed his video work Wednesday Afternoon in solo exhibitions at White Columns, New York City; Counter Gallery, London; and The Power Plant, Toronto. Reviewing the New York exhibition in The New York Times, Roberta Smith called the work a "a minor masterpiece of poetic discretion".

In 2011, his film Louis Ghost Chair, commissioned by the British organization Film and Video Umbrella, premiered at the Holbourne Museum in Bath. His film Lemon 03 Generations (Turn it Around version) was presented as an outdoor projection by the Henry Moore Foundation in December 2014.

In 2015, he presented his film UR Feeling in a solo show at the Camden Arts Centre. Known until this point for his films that portrayed only static objects, UR Feeling was his first work to use human performers.

He was included in the 2006 Tate Triennial.

In 2008, he received the £45,000 Paul Hamlyn Foundation visual-arts award.

Since 2005, he has worked in sound art.

== Collections ==
Martin's work is included in the permanent collections of the Dallas Museum of Art and the Tate Museum, London.
