= Anthology Film Archives =

Center for film preservation in Manhattan, New York

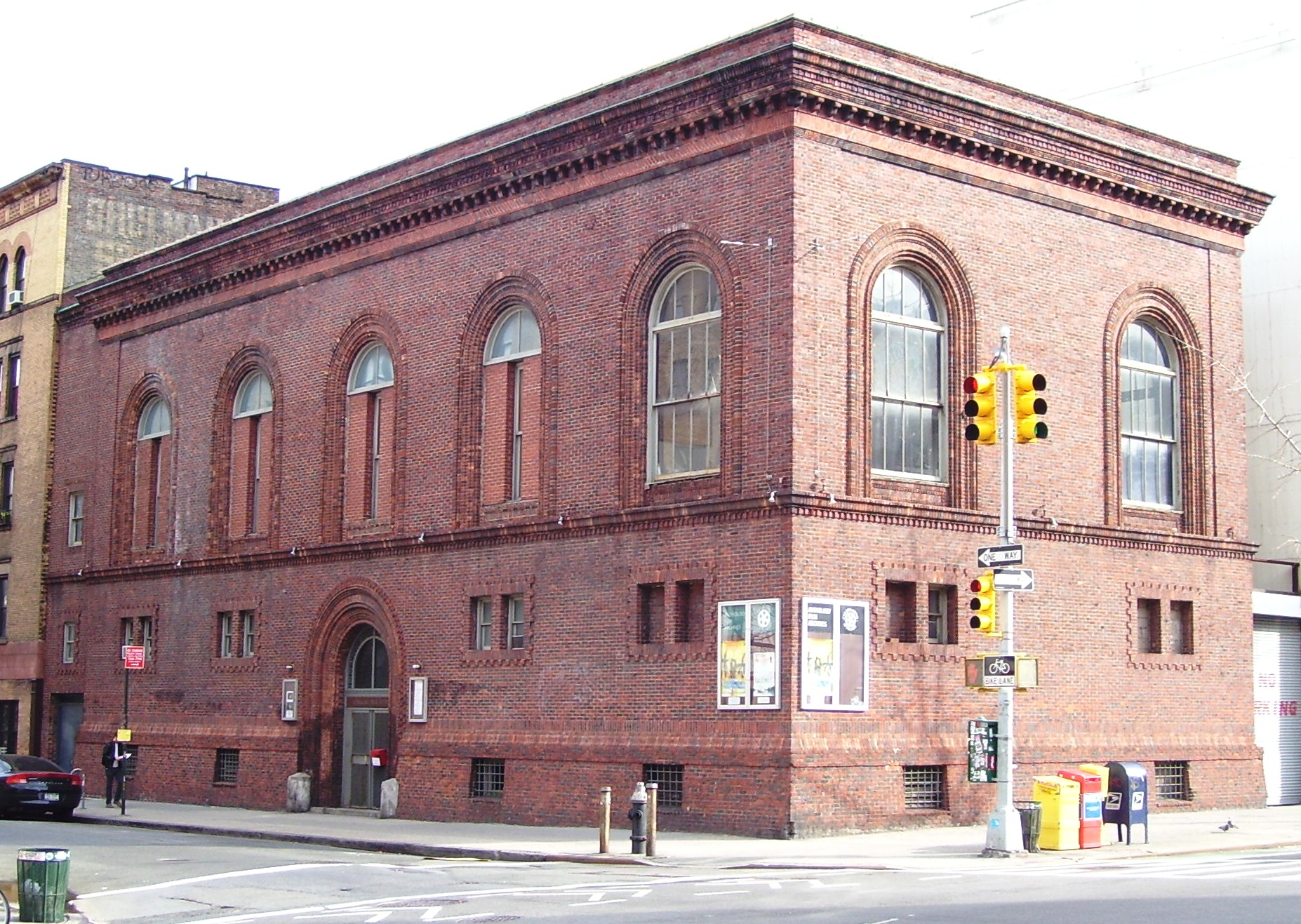
- Anthology's 2nd Avenue building

- Location of Anthology Film Archives in New York City
- Established: November 30, 1970; 55 years ago
- Location: 32 Second Avenue; Manhattan, NY 10003
- Coordinates: 40.724663°N 73.990132°W
- Type: Archive & Cinematheque
- Public transit access: New York City Subway: Second Avenue ( trains); New York City Bus: M15, M21
- Website: anthologyfilmarchives.org

Anthology Film Archives is an international center for the preservation, study, and exhibition of film and video, with a particular focus on independent, experimental, and avant-garde cinema. The film archive and theater is located at 32 Second Avenue on the southeast corner of East 2nd Street, in a New York City historic district in the East Village neighborhood of Manhattan.

== History ==
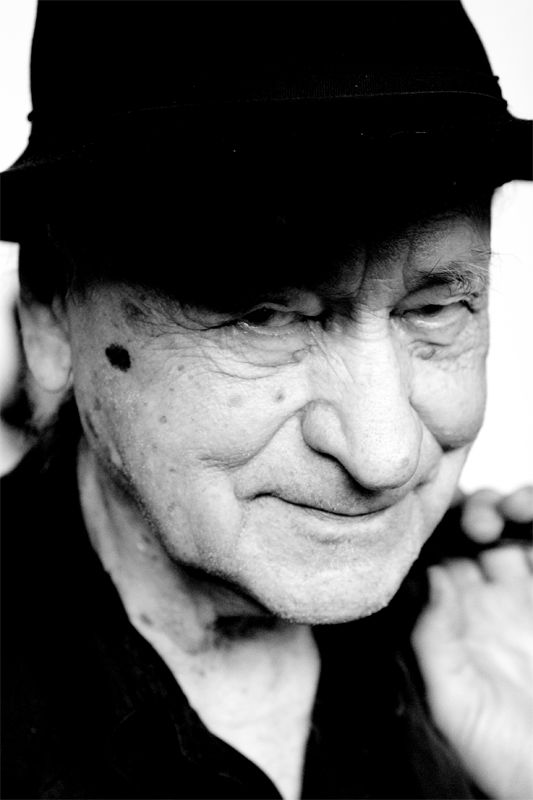
Jonas Mekas, co-founder of Anthology Film Archives

Anthology Film Archives evolved from roots and visions that date from the early 1960s, when Lithuanian artist Jonas Mekas, the founder and director of the Film-makers’ Cinematheque, a showcase for avant-garde films, dreamed of establishing a permanent home where the growing number of new independent and avant-garde films could be shown on a regular basis. This dream became a reality in 1969 when Jerome Hill, P. Adams Sitney, Peter Kubelka, Stan Brakhage, and Mekas drew up plans to create a museum dedicated to the vision of the art of cinema as guided by the avant-garde sensibility. A Film Selection committee – James Broughton, Ken Kelman, Kubelka, Mekas, and Sitney – was formed to establish a definitive collection of films (The Essential Cinema Repertory) and to determine the structure of the new institution.

Anthology opened on November 30, 1970, at the Joseph Papp's Public Theater Building with Jerome Hill as its sponsor. After Hill's death in 1974, Anthology relocated to 80 Wooster Street in SoHo. Pressed by the need for more adequate space, it acquired its present home, a former municipal courthouse, in 1979. Under the guidance of the architects Raimund Abraham and Kevin Bone and at a cost of $1,450,000, the building was adapted to house two motion picture theaters, a reference library, a film preservation department, offices, and a gallery, opening to the public on October 12, 1988.

In 1998, New York University film students began NewFilmmakers, which became a popular weekly series having screened many thousands of documentary, short, and feature films. Films that have played in this series include David Maquiling's Too Much Sleep (1997), Daniel Myrick and Eduardo Sánchez's The Blair Witch Project (1999), Matthew James Sheridan's Wrestlemaniac (2006), Lucas Elliot Eberl's Choose Connor (2007), Usher Morgan's Prego (2015) and Christonikos Tsalikis' I Am Here (2016).

== Programs and collections ==
Anthology Film Archives screens nearly 1,000 public programs annually; features weekly in-person appearances by artists with their work; and publishes historical and scholarly books and catalogs. Anthology maintains an invaluable collection of approximately 20,000 films and 5,000 videotapes and preserves 25-35 films each year with more than 900 titles preserved to date. Anthology's research library holds the world's largest collection of paper materials documenting the history of American and international film and video as art, and is accessed weekly by students, scholars, researchers, writers, artists, and curators.

== Notable artists represented in the collection ==
- Vito Acconci
- Peggy Ahwesh
- Kenneth Anger
- Bruce Baillie
- Ericka Beckman
- Jordan Belson
- Wallace Berman
- Edward Bland
- Lizzie Borden
- Stan Brakhage
- Robert Breer
- James Broughton
- Rudy Burckhardt
- Mary Ellen Bute
- Shirley Clarke
- Bruce Conner
- Tony Conrad
- Joseph Cornell
- Storm de Hirsch
- Manuel De Landa
- Maya Deren
- Robert Downey Sr.
- Ed Emshwiller
- Bradley Eros
- Abel Ferrara
- Fluxus
- Hollis Frampton
- Robert Frank
- Ernie Gehr
- Jean Genet
- Bette Gordon
- Dwinell Grant
- Alexander Hammid
- Hilary Harris
- Jerome Hill
- J. Hoberman
- Peter Hutton
- Ken Jacobs
- Joan Jonas
- Larry Jordan
- Marjorie Keller
- Peter Kubelka
- George Kuchar
- Mike Kuchar
- Frank Kuenstler
- George Landow
- Fernand Léger
- Alfred Leslie
- Helen Levitt
- Jeanne Liotta
- Len Lye
- Danny Lyon
- Willard Maas
- George Maciunas
- Gregory Markopoulos
- Jim McBride
- Taylor Mead
- Jonas Mekas
- Marie Menken
- Robert Nelson
- Nam June Paik
- Sidney Peterson
- Luther Price
- Ron Rice
- Hans Richter
- Lionel Rogosin
- Barbara Rubin
- Carolee Schneemann
- Paul Sharits
- Harry Smith
- Jack Smith
- Michael Snow
- Warren Sonbert
- Frank Stauffacher
- Amy Taubin
- Stan Vanderbeek
- Andy Warhol
- Joyce Weiland
- Jud Yalkut

== The building ==
Manhattan Third District Magistrate's Courthouse and Jail, aka New Essex Market Courthouse, at 32 Second Avenue (aka 43-45 East 2nd Street), opened on April 30, 1919. The three-story brick and terra cotta building was designed in the Renaissance Revival style by Alfred Hopkins, author of a book on prison construction. The design replaced a more ambitious 1913 plan for a 14-story municipal tower.

One of the most notorious gang murders in a neighborhood then notorious for its gangs occurred outside the courthouse doors on August 28, 1923, when "Kid Dropper" was assassinated by gunman Louis Cohen.

The court relocated after February 1946, and the building became a youth center for the Police Athletic League. After 1948, the building was known as the Lower Manhattan Magistrate's Courthouse.

The building lies within the East Village/Lower East Side Historic District, designated by the New York City Landmarks Preservation Commission in 2012.

== In popular culture ==
In the 2004 film Spider-Man 2, the Anthology Film Archives building was used as the exterior of Doctor Octopus' laboratory.
