= Touching =

Touching may refer to:

== Physical contact or sensation ==
- Touch, a sensation processed by the somatosensory system
- Physical intimacy, sensuous proximity or touching
- Forcible touching, a sex offense under New York State law

== Music ==
- Touching (musician), Michael Petkau Falk (born 1979), Canadian singer-songwriter and producer
- Touching (Eric Alexander album), 2013
- Touching (Paul Bley album), 1965

== Other uses ==
- T,O,U,C,H,I,N,G, a 1968 film by Paul Sharits
- Butaritari, formerly Touching Island, an atoll in Kirabati

== See also ==
- Toucheng, a township in Yilan County, Taiwan
