= Arnulf Rainer (film) =

1960 film

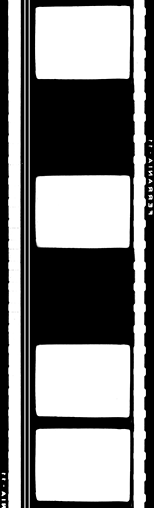
- Film stock with frames
- Directed by: Peter Kubelka
- Release date: May 1960
- Running time: 7 minutes
- Country: Austria
- Language: None

Arnulf Rainer is a 1960 Austrian experimental short film by Peter Kubelka, and one of the earliest flicker films. The film alternates between light or the absence of light and sound or the absence of sound. Since its May 1960 premiere in Vienna, Arnulf Rainer has become known as a fundamental work for structural film. Kubelka released a "negative" version, titled Antiphon, in 2012.

== Structure and content ==
Arnulf Rainer uses only solid black or white film frames, and its audio alternates between white noise and silence. As with his two previous films Adebar and Schwechater, Kubelka arranged Arnulf Rainer as a "metric film", constructed from fixed durations analogous to musical note values. The film is broken into 16 sections, each one lasting precisely 24 seconds (576 frames). The sections are composed of "phrases" that span 2, 4, 6, 8, 9, 12, 16, 18, 24, 36, 48, 72, 96, 144, 192, or 288 frames. All but one of the sections move from longer phrases to shorter phrases. The film creates suspense with the prolonged elements and action with the faster rhythms it uses to alternate between elements.

The rapid, intense patterns of light and sound often produce illusory effects. Interplay between the audio and visual components can make it challenging to distinguish which patterns are being seen and which are heard. Persistent afterimages produce the appearance of swirling colors. Viewers may experience a transparent halo off-screen, particularly during the transitions between sections.

== History ==
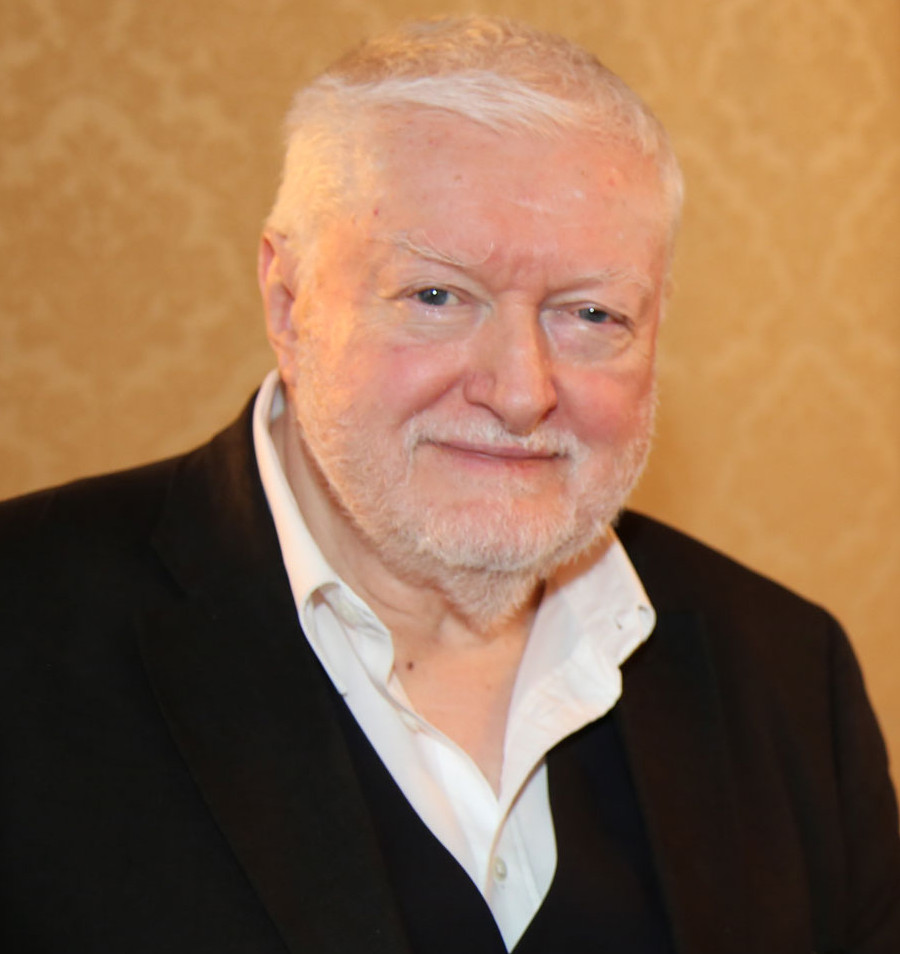
Director Peter Kubelka in 2015

After his clients' negative response to Adebar and Schwechater, Kubelka moved from Vienna, Austria to Stockholm, Sweden. His friend, painter Arnulf Rainer, commissioned him to make a film about Rainer. Before Kubelka was able to purchase film for the project, he laid out patterns on pieces of paper. He made the film out of two strips of film stock—one transparent and one black—and two strips of magnetic sound—one with no signal and one with continuous white noise. Kubelka named the film after Rainer as thanks for sponsoring the project and as a "compromise" in the event that he was disillusioned with the result. Arnulf Rainer premiered May 1960 in Vienna, where most of the audience walked out of the screening. Kubelka has stated that after the premiere, he "lost most of [his] friends because of Arnulf Rainer".

Since its release, Arnulf Rainer has become Kubelka's best known work, embodying his adoption of the frame as the basic unit of cinema instead of the shot. The film is known as a fundamental work for structural film. Critic P. Adams Sitney identified it as one of "only three flicker films of importance", alongside Tony Conrad's The Flicker and Paul Sharits's N:O:T:H:I:N:G. Arnulf Rainer is now part of Anthology Film Archives' Essential Cinema Repertory collection. Kubelka has declined to digitize the film, stating that "cinema is a completely different medium which cannot be imitated by the digital medium."

== Antiphon ==
Kubelka revisited Arnulf Rainer with his 2012 film Antiphon. Antiphon is a "negative" of Arnulf Rainer which switches black for white and silence for sound. Kubelka described the films as "yin and yang". He presented it in an installation titled Monument Film. Monument Film consists of Arnulf Rainer, Antiphon, the two films projected side-by-side, and the two films superimposed.

Monument Film was designed as a film installation that could not be reproduced digitally. Under ideal settings, the superposition of the two films would be a white screen with continuous noise. However, variations in the projectors and speakers reveals the films' common structure. Kubelka has described it as "a duet for projectors." Monument Film premiered at the 2012 New York Film Festival.
