= Kubelka =

Kubelka is a surname. Notable people with the surname include:

- Friedl Kubelka (born 1946), Austrian photographer and filmmaker
- Peter Kubelka (born 1934), Austrian artist
- Susanna Kubelka (1942–2024), French German-speaking writer
