= Film in Which There Appear Edge Lettering, Sprocket Holes, Dirt Particles, Etc. =

1966 short film by Owen Land

- Directed by: Owen Land (as George Landow)
- Release date: 1966
- Running time: 6 minutes
- Country: United States
- Language: English

Film in Which There Appear Edge Lettering, Sprocket Holes, Dirt Particles, Etc. (Note: Some sources use variations on this title, such as Film in Which There Occur Edge-Lettering, Dirt Particles, Sprocket Holes, Etc.) is a 1966 American experimental short film directed by Owen Land.

== Description ==
Film in Which There Appear... is a six-minute loop of the double-printed image of a blinking woman; her image is off-centre, making visible the sprocket holes and edge lettering on the film. According to Land, there is some slight variation in the image onscreen, but "no development in the dramatic or musical sense." Land's intention was to focus attention on the components that film viewers are not supposed to, and do not usually, notice, such as scratches, dirt particles, edge lettering, and sprocket holes. For this reason, Land often scheduled the film first in screenings of his work.

== Production ==
Land created the film to mock the idea of watching a film that doesn't change. The film began life as a 16 mm loop film of "china girl" test leader of a woman blinking, originally used by the Kodak company to test colour reproduction. The loop was intended to be played continuously for 11 minutes, and then, following a commercial break, for another 11 minutes. However, its initial screening was stopped short by a hostile audience reaction. Land printed the loop optically to create Film in Which There Appear.... He has confessed to feeling "very silly" about passively watching the film in a dark cinema, and occasionally stands up to point out details to the film's audience. Land later created a 20-minute split-screen expansion of the same loop, which he claims "looks better because it's more of a horizontal film than a vertical film; you look across it, not into it."

== Reception ==
Film in Which There Appear... is considered an important work in the structural film movement. Fred Camper described Film in Which There Appear... as "a kind of Duchampian found object, a looped test film that focuses attention on the medium and the viewer." J. Hoberman called the film "blandly presented". Juan A. Suárez noted the film's unique element of "indeterminacy and open-endedness", remarking that the more the film is projected, the more scratches and dust it will collect.

== See also ==
- List of American films of 1966
