= Our Trip to Africa =

1966 Austrian avant-garde short film

- Directed by: Peter Kubelka
- Edited by: Peter Kubelka
- Release date: 1966
- Running time: 13 minutes
- Country: Austria
- Language: German

Our Trip to Africa (German: Unsere Afrikareise) is a 1966 Austrian avant-garde short film by Peter Kubelka, originally commissioned as a travel diary documenting a wild game hunt. Kubelka used intricate editing strategies to produce a work about anti-colonialism.

== Production ==
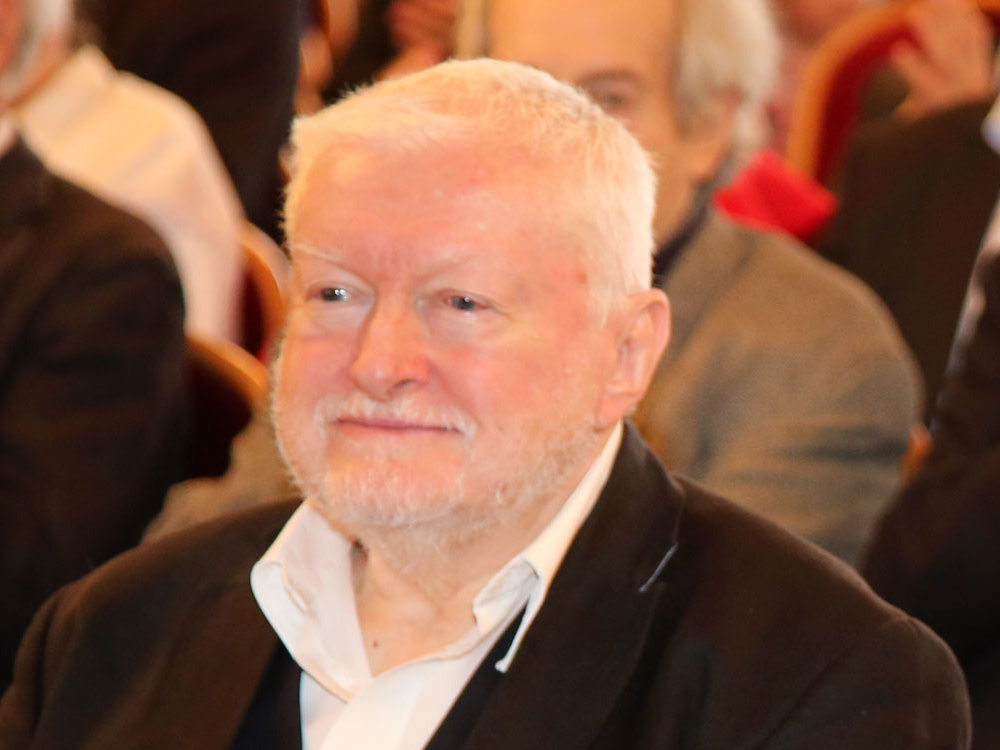
Director Peter Kubelka in 2015

=== Photography ===
Kubelka was hired in 1961 by a couple from Wels, Austria, to document a hunting trip they were taking with three other people. The group traveled from Wels through Yugoslavia to Athens, Greece. From there, they took a ship to Cairo, Egypt and traveled up the Nile.

Over the course of the trip, Kubelka recorded three hours of film and fourteen hours of audio. He shot on Gevaert color positive stock. Since the film stock was sensitive to overexposure, he often intentionally underexposed it. Kubelka used simple compositions whose quick recognisability became useful as part of his elaborate editing strategies.

=== Editing ===
Once the group returned to Vienna, the couple who commissioned the film expected Kubelka would take four to six weeks to complete the film; however, the process ended up lasting five years. Kubelka produced what he described as a "vocabulary" from his recordings. Without money to create a workprint, he worked from a black-and-white negative. He cut out three frames from each shot and placed them on a card, arranging them by color, rhythm, subject, and theme. There were roughly 1,400 shots in total. For each of the audio recordings, he transcribed the sounds phonetically into a version of a symphonic score.

Kubelka initially worked from an editing table belonging to a correspondent for a foreign news service. It became apparent to his financiers that the film he was making was radically different from the film they were expecting from him. In a compromise with their lawyers, Kubelka agreed to give them all material he did not use in his version. In 1964 Jerome Hill gave him a grant to go to the United States and spend two years working on the film. After returning to Vienna, he found that Listo-Film was unable to make optical sound on 16 mm film. Stan Brakhage arranged for him to deliver a lecture in Denver, where Brakhage's lab Western Cine was able to print the film.

=== Soundtrack ===
Kubelka did not do any audio mixing on the film, so all of the sound on Our Trip to Africa was recorded live. He incorporated dialogue, music, and intermittent gunfire. He recorded live music as well as songs broadcast on the radio, with clips of contemporary pop songs, British dancehall music, Egyptian tango, and the score of Around the World in 80 Days. Kubelka's editing was designed to create "synch events" in which image and sound are combined in unique ways. He cited Dziga Vertov and Luis Buñuel as predecessors in his use of juxtaposition in image and sound.

== Themes ==
The editing strategies of Our Trip to Africa form a rendering of colonial exploitation. The violence of hunting wild game is mixed with other footage, suggesting violence against other subjects of the camera. The film's final sequence, in which an indigenous man remarks "I like to visit your country if I find chance", is intended to address the asymmetric relationship between ethnographers and their subjects.

== Release and reception ==
In 1966 Kubelka premiered the completed film for the people who commissioned the film, along with friends and other artists. Upset with how they were portrayed, they nearly attacked him after the screening. Their lawyers demanded that he turn over the film so they could destroy it; the parties reached an agreement that Kubelka would not screen Our Trip to Africa in their hometown. After the film's release, William Gilkerson described it as "a depressing little work, somewhat reminiscent of the Mondo Cane technique, but much more effective and honest."

Our Trip to Africa is now part of Anthology Film Archives' Essential Cinema Repertory collection. In the 2012 Sight & Sound poll, the film received votes from two film critics and two directors. Filmmaker Ashim Ahluwalia included the film in his personal top ten (for The Sight & Sound Top 50 Greatest Films of All Time poll), writing: "Along with Buñuel’s Las Hurdes, Unsere Afrikareise is an understanding of all documentary as a form of colonisation. Essential." Michael Finnissy's 1998 composition Unsere Afrikareise takes its title from Kubelka's film.
