= Deseret =

Deseret (/ˌdɛzəˈrɛt/, Deseret alphabet: 𐐔𐐯𐑅𐐨𐑉𐐯𐐻) is a word in the Book of Mormon.

Deseret may also refer to:

== Places ==
- Deseret, Utah, an unincorporated community
  - Fort Deseret
- Deseret Ranches, Florida, United States
- State of Deseret, a provisional U.S. state, 1849–1851

== Arts, entertainment, and media ==
- Deseret (film), a 1995 experimental documentary film
- Deseret, a fictional state in The Folk of the Fringe (1989) by Orson Scott Card
- Deseret, a fictional state in Harry Turtledove's Southern Victory Series
- Deseret News, a Utah newspaper

== Other uses ==
- Deseret (Book of Mormon), meaning "honeybee"
- Deseret alphabet, a 19th c. phonemic English spelling reform
  - Deseret (Unicode block)
- Deseret Test Center, 1960s U.S. Army CBW test facility
- University of Deseret, 1850–1892, now University of Utah
- Deseret Nation, or #DezNat; users described as alt-right Mormons

== See also ==
- Deseret on Wiktionary
