= The Flicker =

1966 American experimental film by Tony Conrad

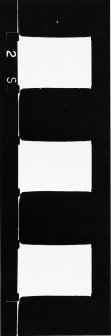
- Film strip with several frames of The Flicker
- Directed by: Tony Conrad
- Release date: March 1966
- Running time: 30 minutes
- Country: United States
- Language: None
- Budget: $300

The Flicker is a 1966 American experimental film by Tony Conrad. Aside from its opening credits, the film uses only solid black or white frames. It changes the rate at which it switches between black and white frames to produce stroboscopic effects.

Conrad spent several months designing the film before shooting it in a matter of days. He produced and distributed The Flicker with the help of Jonas Mekas. The film is now recognized as a key work of structural filmmaking.

== Story ==
The film starts with a warning message, which reads:

WARNING. The producer, distributor, and exhibitors waive all liability for physical or mental injury possibly caused by the motion picture "The Flicker."

Since this film may induce epileptic seizures or produce mild symptoms of shock treatment in certain persons, you are cautioned to remain in the theatre only at your own risk. A physician should be in attendance.

The warning is accompanied by the ragtime tune "Raggedy Ann" played on an old gramophone. The film then goes on to a frame that says "Tony Conrad Presents," and then to a frame that says "The Flicker," at which point it starts. The screen goes white, then after a short while, the screen flickers with a single black frame. This is repeated, at varying rate, again and again until it creates a strobe effect, for which the film is titled. This continues until the film stops abruptly.

== Development ==
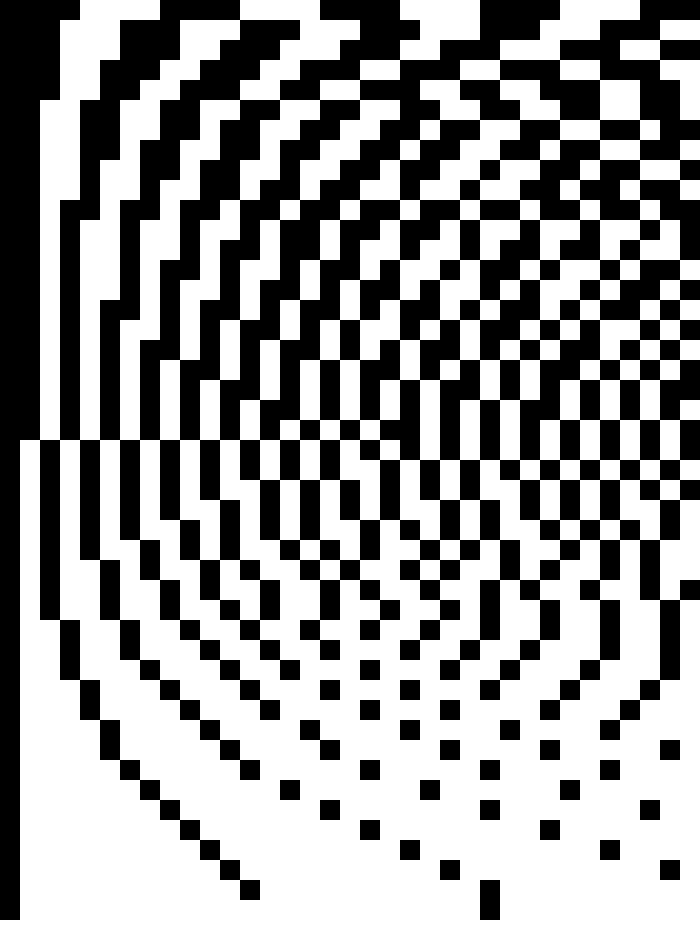
Conrad's design for arranging the black and white frames in The Flicker

The Flicker grew out of experiments by Conrad and Mario Montez. During one conducted in March 1963, Jack Smith found hallucinatory patterns in the projector flicker. Conrad was familiar with the effects of stroboscopic light from a physiology class at Harvard University. Conrad observed the use of strobe lights during a rock show in May 1963 hosted by Murray the K at the Fox Theater in Brooklyn, writing that it "built up excitement to a fantastic and nearly frenzied peak". By November 1964, Conrad had begun designing a flicker movie with "gradually lengthening alternate white & black areas on the film." He made notes on how to expose progressively longer sections of film with black and white, ignoring the frame widths.

Conrad continued planning The Flicker with paper diagrams for several months. He wanted to arrange the frames to create multiple frequencies while balancing the number of black and white frames. He consulted William S. Burroughs's 1964 article "Points of Distinction Between Sedative and Consciousness-Expanding Drugs" while arranging the patterns. In June 1965, Conrad tested various flicker speeds with his friend Lew Oliver. They found that the strobe effect was most powerful between 6 and 16 Hz. Oliver suggested using slightly longer durations for black frames, so Conrad used an extra black frame when constructing cycles of odd length.

== Production ==
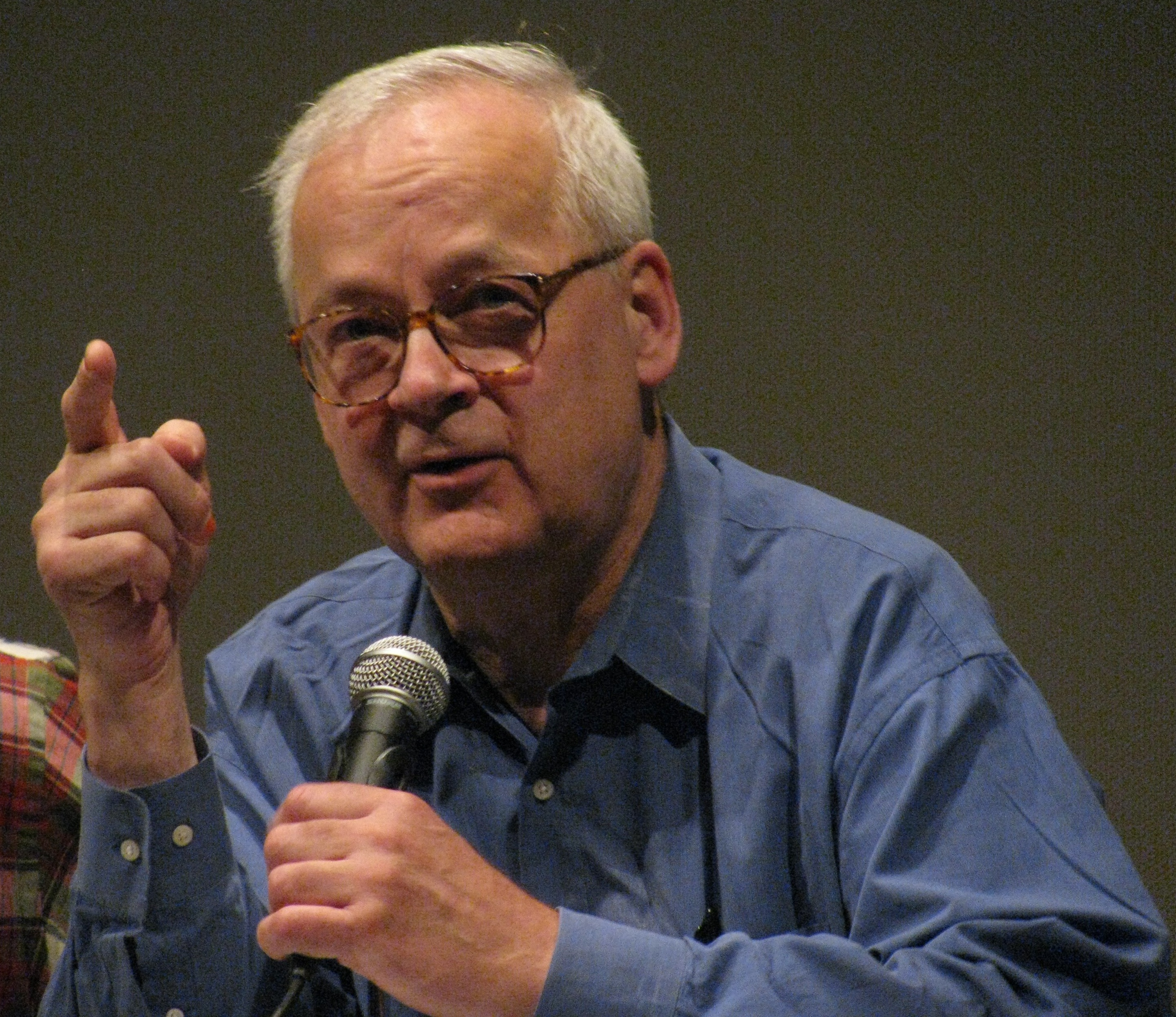
Director Tony Conrad in 2009

Filmmaker Jonas Mekas gave Conrad rolls of film and helped obtain a Bolex camera to use. He shot the black frames by covering the camera lens. He first tried unsuccessfully to shoot the white frames by removing the lens but ultimately ended up shooting a sheet of white paper. Conrad shot the material over the course of a few days. He produced one 16 mm roll with 47 arrangements of black and white frames and made ten copies. He used an inexpensive 8 mm film splicer to reorder the frames such that each of the 47 arrangements was repeated ten times.

Conrad knew a friend who had died from an epileptic seizure, so he talked to a doctor at Columbia Presbyterian Hospital's seizure clinic about the film. He was told that less than 0.01% of the population was affected and that prompting non-epileptic people with a warning could cause them to have "seizures". He was still concerned about legal liability after finding two cases in New York where theater owners had been sued after people suffered reactions from a frame rate of 16 frames per second. With this in mind, he decided to add a warning to the beginning of the film. He also added a long section with the film's credits to lull the audience into a state of compliance, making the flicker effect stronger.

The soundtrack for The Flicker was made by Conrad on a synthesizer that he built solely for the film. He operated the synthesizer around 20 Hz so that the people could hear it as either a rhythm or pitch. The soundtrack uses tape delays and heavy reverb. Conrad intended for the audio to be played from a separate stereo tape because of film's poor sound fidelity.

== Release ==
An unfinished version of The Flicker was previewed at the Film-Makers' Cinemathèque in New York on December 14, 1965. A private screening of the completed film was held there on February 13, 1966, and it had its public premiere the following month. Each of the Cinematheque's screenings had a doctor on-site. The film began to find a larger audience that September through the fourth New York Film Festival at Lincoln Center.

Conrad programmed a digital version of The Flicker for the Amiga computer during the 1980s. After a lab destroyed the original film, Mekas's Anthology Film Archives helped preserve a copy of The Flicker. The film is now part of Anthology Film Archives' Essential Cinema Repertory collection.

== Reception ==
The Flicker often prompted strong reactions from audiences. Mekas noted that most viewers walked out of the first screening. For some people, the film induced headaches or vomiting. Although the frames are entirely black or white, many people report seeing movement, shapes, or colors.

After the film's premiere, East Village Other reviewer Richard Preston called it "a true avant-garde 'film' and/or experience and one that I can't recommend to anyone except the truly adventurous", adding that "On second thoughts maybe this is not only avant-garde but revolutionary also." P. Adams Sitney, in his 1969 article defining structural film, characterized the structure of The Flicker as "one long crescendo–diminuendo ... with a single blast of stereophonic buzz". He wrote that the film "brought a new clarity to Kubelka's Arnulf Rainer". Filmmaker Malcolm Le Grice also likened the film to Arnulf Rainer but noted that the former focused on autonomic reactions to the strobe rate as well as the "awareness of gradually changing modes of perception." Amos Vogel called The Flicker "a great film."

== See also ==
- List of American films of 1965

== Bibliography ==
- Hoberman, J. (2025). Everything Is Now: The 1960s New York Avant-Garde—Primal Happenings, Underground Movies, Radical Pop. Verso Books. ISBN 978-1-80429-086-6.
- Joseph, Branden W. (2008). Beyond the Dream Syndicate: Tony Conrad and the Arts After Cage. Zone Books. ISBN 978-1-890951-86-3.
- Le Grice, Malcolm (1977). Abstract Film and Beyond. MIT Press. ISBN 978-0-262-12077-7.
- MacDonald, Scott (2005). A Critical Cinema 5: Interviews with Independent Filmmakers. University of California Press. ISBN 978-0-520-93908-0.
- Renan, Sheldon (1967). An Introduction to the American Underground Film. E. P. Dutton.
- Singer, Marilyn, ed. (1976). A History of the American Avant-Garde Cinema. American Federation of Arts.
