= China Girl (filmmaking) =

Color test image for movie film

A China Girl image with explanatory labels

A china girl (also known as a girl head, china boy or china animal) is a type of test film, an image of a woman, a man, an animal, an item or a pop culture character accompanied by color bars that appears for a few frames (typically one to four) in the reel leader. A "China Girl" was used by the lab technician for calibration purposes when processing the film (with the still photography equivalent being a "Shirley Card"). The origin of the term is a matter of some dispute but is usually accepted to be a reference to the models used to create the frames: either they were actually china (porcelain) mannequins or the make-up worn by the live models made them appear to be mannequins.

Originally the "China Girl" frames were created in-house by laboratories to varying standards. "China Girls" were in use since the early 1920s, and remained central to film laboratory techniques across the twentieth century. By the mid-1970s, engineers from the Eastman Kodak Company developed the Laboratory Aim Density system as a means of simplifying the production of motion picture prints. Under the LAD system, Kodak created many duplicate negatives of a single China Girl and provided them to laboratories to include in their standard leaders. These LAD frames were exposed to specific guidelines and allowed a laboratory technician to quickly make a subjective evaluation of a print's exposure and color tone by looking at the China Girl herself. If a more objective evaluation were required, a densitometer could be used to compare the density of the color patches in the LAD frame with Kodak's published guidelines.

In keeping with changes to the modern laboratory process, Kodak also provide a "Digital LAD" to be incorporated in the film-out process to check the accuracy of the film printer and processor.

In 2005, "China Girl" images were the subject of an art exhibit by Julie Buck and Karin Segal at the Harvard Film Archive.

The "China girl" has occasionally appeared as a visual trope in experimental films over the years. Some experimental films which use "China girls" include Cosmic Ray (1962) by Bruce Conner, Film in Which There Appear Edge Lettering, Sprocket Holes, Dirt Particles, Etc. (1965–66) by Owen Land, New Improved Institutional Quality: In the Environment of Liquids and Nasals a Parasitic Vowel Sometimes Develops (1976) by Owen Land, Girls on Film (2005) by Julie Buck and Karin Segal, MM (1996) by Timoleon Wilkins, Standard Gauge (1984) by Morgan Fisher, To the Happy Few by Thomas Draschan and Stella Friedrichs, China Girls (2006) by Michelle Silva, and Releasing Human Energies (2012) by Mark Toscano.

"China girl" images appear during the closing credits of Quentin Tarantino's Death Proof.

The narrator and main character in the 2013 novel The Flamethrowers by Rachel Kushner shares her experience as a China Girl model for a film lab in New York City.

== See also ==
- Shirley cards
- Lenna
