= Schwechater =

1958 experimental short film

- Directed by: Peter Kubelka
- Cinematography: Peter Kubelka
- Edited by: Peter Kubelka
- Release date: 1958
- Running time: 1 minute
- Country: Austria

Schwechater [ˈʃvɛçaːtɐ] is a 1958 experimental short film by Austrian filmmaker Peter Kubelka. It is the second entry in his trilogy of metrical films, between Adebar and Arnulf Rainer.

Originally commissioned to make an advertisement for Schwechater Bier, Kubelka edited footage from the shoot based on a complex set of rules, producing a rapid procession of images. Although the company was displeased with the commercial, Schwechater found favour as a work of avant-garde cinema.

== Description ==
Schwechater contains 1,440 frames, making it exactly one minute long when projected at the standard rate of 24 frames per second. The film has no narrative, and it cuts between images quickly enough that they form flickering patterns.

Four different moving images appear throughout the film. One shows a woman sitting at a table as beer is poured into her glass, and another shows her drinking the beer. There is also footage of a champagne glass filled with beer as well as a group of people in a restaurant. It ends with the Schwechater logo.

== Production ==
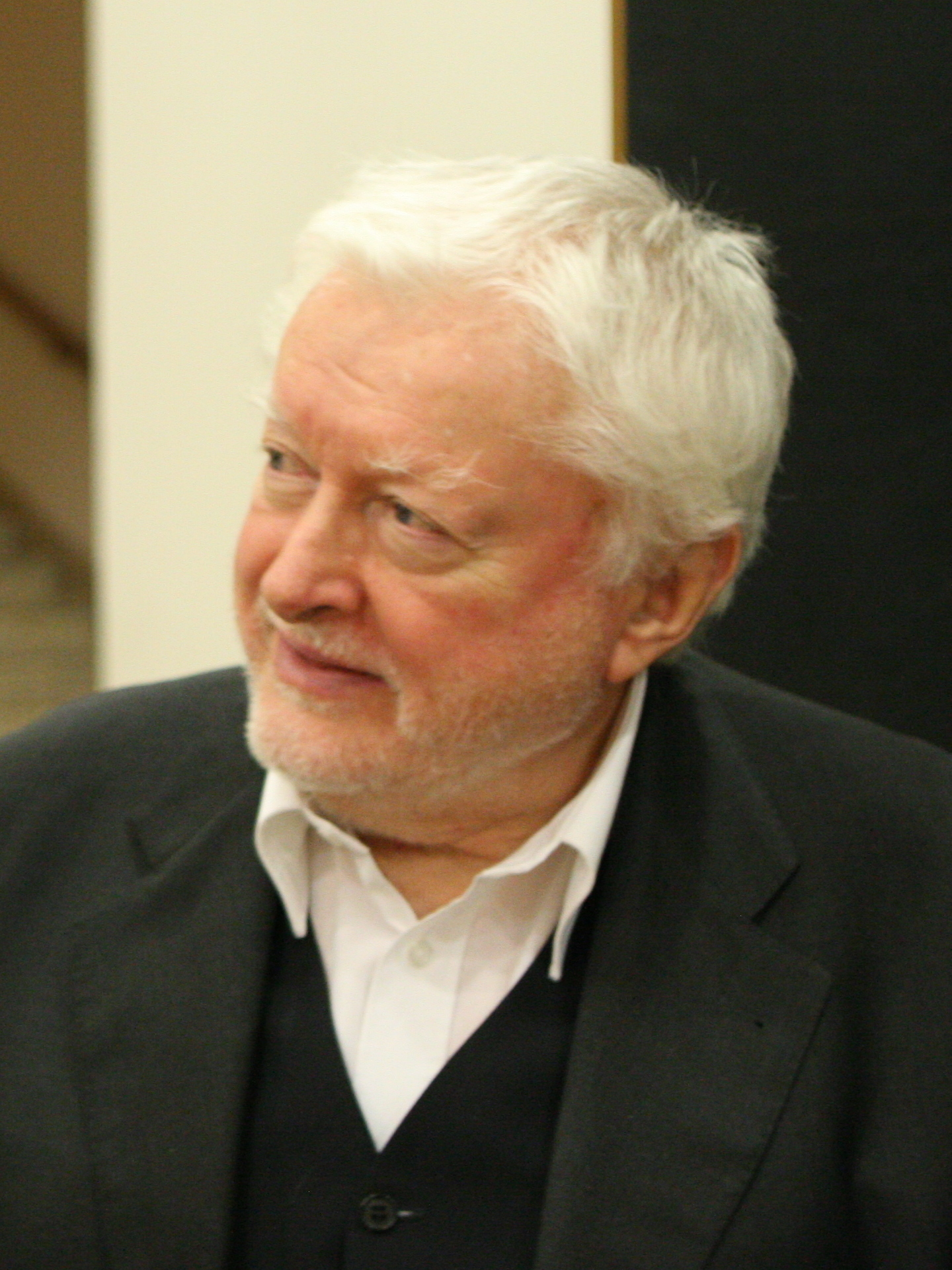
Director Peter Kubelka in 2014

=== Photography ===
The Schwechater Bier brewery commissioned Kubelka to make an advertisement for its beer. Kubelka shot using an old, hand-operated 35 mm scientific camera. The camera had no viewfinder, and Kubelka largely ignored the composition of the images. Once the film stock was used up, Kubelka humored the art director for Schwechater Bier and cranked the empty camera, pretending to continue filming.

=== Editing ===
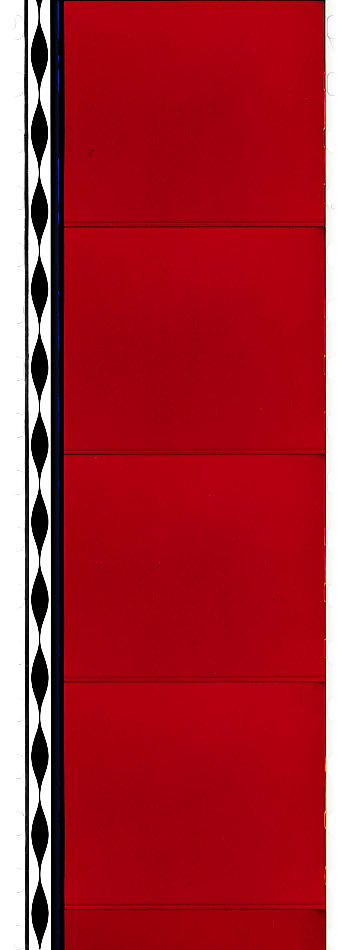
A sequence of red frames from the film

Kubelka used four shots spanning 16, 30, 90, and 1,440 frames as the material for Schwechater. He produced high-contrast positive and negative prints, copied so that each shot looped for exactly 1,440 frames. After getting the developed film from the laboratory, Kubelka let it sit for six weeks until executives from Schwechater Bier began asking about the commercial.

The editing process for Schwechater lasted six months. Kubelka produced a score for the film with a complex system of overlapping structures to determine how to combine the eight film strips. One such structure specifies outlines the gradual permeation of the colour red in Schwechater. The film alternates between black-and-white sequences and red sequences; the black and white sequences decrease in duration from 110 frames down to 10 frames as the red sequences remain are all roughly 30 frames. As such, the film becomes increasingly red over the course of its runtime. The use of red was an ironic way to meet the company's requirement that Kubelka create a color film.

Another structure specifies which frames do and do not contain images. Each sequence of frames with images is immediately followed by a sequence of the same length containing frames showing a solid color—either black or red. The frame count of these sequences traverses the powers of two, from 1 up to 32 and back down.

=== Soundtrack ===
For the film's soundtrack, Kubelka created a score of rasping sounds and beeps. The intermittent periods of sound happen parallel to the red-tinted sequences, with a low hum and one to three sine tones. When the Schwechater logo appears at the end of the film, Kubelka used a sustained, high-pitched sine tone.

== Release ==
After Kubelka delivered the finished version to Schwechater, they stopped payment to him, ended their relation with him, and destroyed the company's print of the film. Initial reaction to Schwechater was very negative. The company sued Kubelka, and the film lab, which had Schwechater as a client, stopped making prints for him. His decision to leave Austria was in part because of the response to Schwechater.

The film found success on the European film festival circuit, and it was included in the third Knokke-Le-Zoute Experimental Film Festival in 1963. After several years, Schwechater Bier requested another print of it. Schwechater is now part of Anthology Film Archives' Essential Cinema Repertory collection.

== See also ==
- List of avant-garde films of the 1950s

== Bibliography ==
- MacDonald, Scott (2008). Canyon Cinema: The Life and Times of an Independent Film Distributor. University of California Press. ISBN 978-0-520-94061-1.
- Noguez, Dominique (1995). "Der Welt-Mensch". In Jutz, Gabriele; Tscherkassky, Peter (eds.). Peter Kubelka (in German). PVS Verleger. ISBN 978-3-901196-19-5.
- Sitney, P. Adams (1974). Visionary Film: The American Avant-Garde, 1943–2000. Oxford University Press. ISBN 978-0-19-514886-2.
- Tscherkassky, Peter (2012). "The World According to Kubelka". In Tscherkassky, Peter (ed.). Film Unframed: A History of Austrian Avant-garde Cinema. FilmmuseumSynemaPublikation. ISBN 978-3-901644-42-9.
