= John Smith (English filmmaker) =

British avant garde filmmaker

- Born: 1952 (age 73–74); Walthamstow, East London, UK
- Occupations: Filmmaker; professor

John Smith (born 1952, Walthamstow, East London, England) is a British avant garde filmmaker and professor of Fine Art based in London. His work has been noted for his use of humour in exploring various themes that often play upon the film spectator's conditioned assumptions of the medium, and he is therefore often associated with structural film.

His 1976 film The Girl Chewing Gum has been called one of the most important avant-garde films of the 20th century.

== Early life and education ==
Smith was born in 1952 in Walthamstow, East London and later studied film at the Royal College of Art. During this time he found inspiration in conceptual art, structural film and spoken word.

== Career ==
While still attending college, Smith made The Girl Chewing Gum in 1976, which remains his best-known work. The film consists of two camera shots and narration by Smith. He directs the movement of passersby, pigeons, and even inanimate objects. The official Tate artwork collection text draws a relation to François Truffaut's 1973 film La nuit américaine, pointing out the shared theme of exposing the work of the director.

Smith lives and works in east London. He is Professor Emeritus of Fine Art at University of East London after teaching for over 40 years. He has also worked as a lecturer at Central Saint Martins. Among his students are musician Jarvis Cocker and film director Carol Morley.

Smith has made more than 60 films over 50 years. He studied together with filmmaker Peter Gidal, a founding member of the London Film-Makers' Co-op. Smith was at some point part of the LFMC, speaking fondly of colleagues such as Ian Breakwell.

== Reception ==
In a 2022 interview article for Frieze, a collaborator of Smith, Juliet Jacques, describes The Girl Chewing Gum as marrying "the 1970s structural film obsession with Brechtian alienation".

In 2013 Smith won the annual Film London Jarman Award.

== Style ==
Smith has said his goal is "making films that are as simple as possible".

== Selected filmography ==
Year	Title	Ref(s).
1975	Associations	
1976	The Girl Chewing Gum	
1977	Hackney Marshes - November 4th 1977	
1984	Shepherd's Delight	
1986	Om	
1987	The Black Tower	
1991	Slow Glass	
1996	Blight	
1999	The Kiss	
1999	Regression	
2001	Lost Sound	
2001-2007	Hotel Diaries	
2003	Worst Case Scenario	
2010	Flag Mountain	
2011	unusual Red cardigan	
2011	The Man Phoning Mum	
2012	Dad's Stick	
2014	White Hole	
2015	Steve Hates Fish	
2016	Who Are We?	
2017	Song for Europe	
2019	A State of Grace	
2020	Citadel	
2020	Covid Messages	
2024	Being John Smith	

== Bibliography ==
- The Arts in the 1970s: Cultural Closure? (with Peter Gidal, Materialist Film (Routledge) and Bart J. Moore-Gilbert), Routledge, 1994, ISBN 0-415-09906-4
