= Adebar =

- Title card
- Directed by: Peter Kubelka
- Release date: 1957
- Running time: 2 minutes
- Country: Austria

Adebar is a 1957 Austrian avant-garde short film directed by Peter Kubelka. It is the first entry in Kubelka's trilogy of metrical films, followed by Schwechater and Arnulf Rainer. Adebar is the first film to be edited entirely according to a mathematical rhythmic strategy.

== Description ==
Adebar uses footage from only eight unique shots that show dancing silhouettes, arranged in 16 rigidly structured sequences. Each sequence spans 104 film frames and consists of four shots lasting 13, 26, or 52 frames. The shots always alternate between positive and negative images. Some freeze on the first or last frame of the shot. The film's soundtrack is a 26-frame loop of Pygmy music.

== Production ==
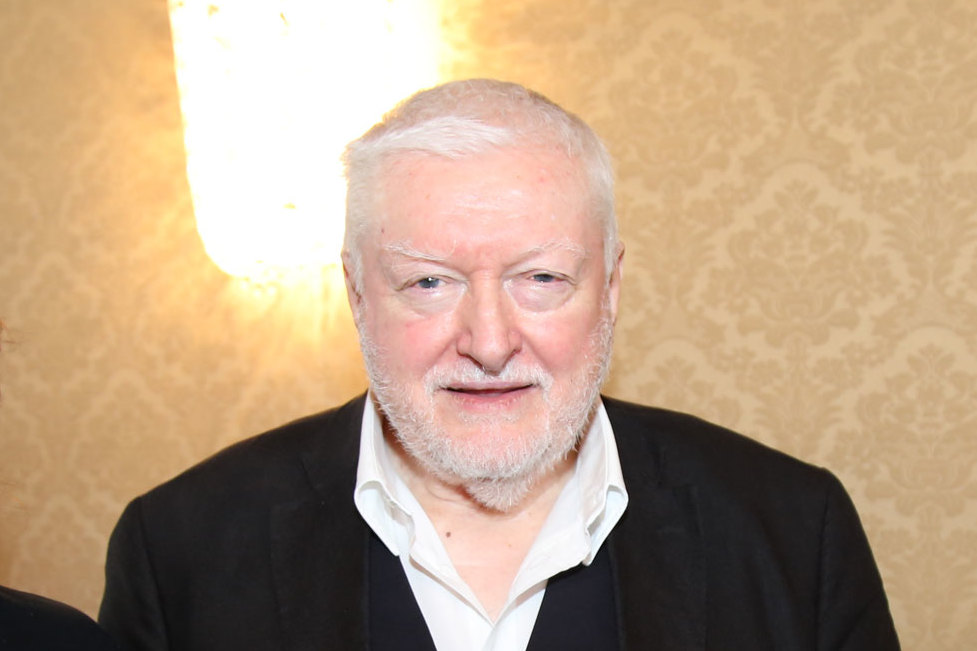
Filmmaker Peter Kubelka in 2015

Kubelka was commissioned to create a commercial for Café Adebar, a dance bar in Vienna. He filmed dancers against a white wall, using extreme backlighting to create silhouettes. Compared to the production of his first film Mosaik im Vertauen, Kubelka was less concerned with composition during production. He waited until after filming and selected images that fit what he wanted for use in Adebar.

== Release ==
Upon Adebar's completion, Café Adebar rejected it as an advertisement. The film was screened at the second Knokke-Le-Zoute Experimental Film Festival in April 1958. Kubelka also exhibited it at the European Forum Alpbach. The film strip had ripped in a projector, so he turned it into a sculpture by cutting it and attaching it to haystack posts so that viewers could examine it and cut off pieces. Adebar is now part of Anthology Film Archives' Essential Cinema Repertory collection.
