= American Dreams: Lost and Found =

1984 film by James Benning

American Dreams: Lost and Found is a 1984 American experimental film by James Benning about two American individuals (baseball legend Henry Aaron and political assassin Arthur Bremer) chasing the "American Dream".

== Synopsis ==
The documentary short recounting the history of America from 1954 to 1976 using the director's personal collection of Hank Aaron memorabilia with excerpts from Bremer's diary on the bottom scroll and audio clips from popular songs and news broadcasts of their respective eras.

== Availability ==
The film was restored by Austrian Film Museum released on DVD by Edition Filmmusuem alongside his 1986 film Landscape Suicide in October 2011.

== See also ==
- Still image film
- Minimalist film
- Structural film
