= Standish Lawder =

American artist and filmmaker (1936–2014)

Standish Dyer Lawder (1936 – 21 June 2014) was an American artist, art historian and inventor, who contributed to the structural film movement in the late 1960s and early 1970s.

== Biography ==
Born in Connecticut in 1936, Lawder attended Williams College and the National Autonomous University of Mexico as an undergraduate, and studied at the Ludwig-Maximilians-Universität München (LMU). While at the LMU, he became a test subject for a neurologist researching phosphenes at around 1960. During these experiments, he was injected with measured amounts of LSD, mescaline and psilocybin, and "spent a whole day in the clinic". In this, he became an early subject of psychedelics. Afterwards, he received his doctor of philosophy as an art historian at Yale University. His thesis, which was later published as The Cubist Cinema, examines the correlation between the history of film and its impact on modern art, described as a holistic overview by Anthony Reveaux in Film Quarterly.

For several decades, Standish ran a community non-profit darkroom called the Denver Darkroom. It began as Standish's dream workspace which he cordially extended to visiting filmmakers, artists, journalists and friends. It was an artistic hotspot housing a large commercial-size black and white darkroom, studios, a library, a kitchen, a dining room/ gallery and sleeping lofts/ prop storage. The demand for the community darkroom was huge, and it became a non-profit in 1998, accepting paid memberships to cover operating costs. Beginning in 2000 classes in Photography were offered by Artists and faculty of Metropolitan State College of Denver (now MSU) at the Denver Darkroom.

Lawder's first wife, Ursula, was the daughter of Richard Strauss-Ruppel and Frieda Ruppel, who later married Dadaist artist Hans Richter. He was with his second wife, Dianne Vanderlip, Curator of Modern art the Denver Art Museum, for 22 years and divorced in 2001.

Lawder died on June 21, 2014.

== Filmography ==
His body of work is purported to span over 25 films and his literary works encapsulates several essays on experimental film. His first endeavors with experimental films started in his basement during a sabbatical of his in the late 1960s and early 1970s. One of his works during this span, Necrology, has been cited by fellow filmmaker Hollis Frampton as "the sickest joke I've ever seen on film".

For the production of his first two films, Runaway and Corridor, Lawder built his own contact printer using an incandescent light bulb housed within a coffee can. With it, he would expose his films by manipulating the brightness of the light bulb, then shined the beam it created through the flashlight tube to the film gate of his camera.

Lawder also used 1950s sex education films on Dangling Participle and animated found footage on Runaway, Raindance and Roadfilm (the latter to the tune of The Beatles "Why Don’t We Do It in the Road?").

== Preservation ==
The Academy Film Archive has preserved several of Standish Lawder's films, including Necrology, Catfilm For Katy and Cynnie and Raindance.

== Selected filmography ==
- 3 x 3: A Tic-Tac-Toe Sonata in 3 Moves (1963)
- Budget Film (1969)
- Catfilm for Ursula (1969)
- Construction Job (1969)
- Eleven Different Horses (1969)
- Headfilm (1969)
- Runaway (1969)
- Specific Gravity (1969)
- Corridor (1970)
- Dangling Participle (1970)
- Roadfilm (1970)
- Necrology (1971)
- Color Film (1971)
- Prime Time (1972)
- Raindance (1972)
- Sixty Suicide Notes (1972)
- Sunday in Southbury (1972)
- Automatic Diaries 1971–73 (1973)
- Catfilm for Katy and Cynnie (1973)
- Regeneration (1980)

== Bibliography ==
=== Books ===
- The Cubist Cinema. New York: New York University Press. 1970. ISBN 978-0814749579.

=== Essays ===
- Lawder, Standish D. (Winter 1961–62). "Ernest Wilhelm Nay: An Evaluation of His Recent Paintings". Art Journal. 21 (2). College Art Association: 101–3. JSTOR 774261.
- ———; Knoll, M.; Kugler, J.; Höfer, O. (1963). "Effects of Chemical Stimulation of Electrically-Induced Phosphenes on their Bandwidth, Shape, Number and Intensity". Stereotactic and Functional Neurosurgery. 23 (3). Basel: 201–26. doi:10.1159/000104299. ISSN 1011-6125. PMID 14033808.
- "Fernand Leger and Ballet Mechanique". Image. 2 (6). London. October 1965.
- Sitney, P. Adams, ed. (1975). "Eisenstein and Constructivism". Essential Cinema. 2. 1. New York University Press: New York. ISBN 978-0814777671.
