= Remedial Reading Comprehension =

- Directed by: Owen Land (as George Landow)
- Release date: 1970
- Running time: 5 minutes
- Country: United States
- Language: English

Remedial Reading Comprehension is an experimental short film by Owen Land, produced in 1970.

== Description ==
Remedial Reading Comprehension takes the form of an ephemeral or educational film. Land combines found colour footage, a mock television commercial about rice, text from a speed-reading manual, and footage of the director running, with the superimposed words, "This Is A Film About You... Not Its Maker." The speed-reading text is taken from "Pupils into Students," an essay written by Jacques Barzun and published in Teacher in America (1945).

Remedial Reading Comprehension forms part of the structural film movement of the 1960s and 70s, in that it considers "film itself as subject matter, its basic structures rather than its actual physical presence." The film opens with a woman dreaming about an auditorium of people, who are sitting down as though about to watch a movie. In this scene, Land's camera assumes the point of view of the movie screen itself.

== Reception ==
Remedial Reading Comprehension is considered a prominent and important work in the structural film movement. Scholar Fred Camper wrote that the film “does not try to build up an illusion of reality, to combine the images together with the kind of spatial or rhythmic continuity that would suggest that one is watching “real” people or objects. It works rather toward the opposite end, to make one aware of the unreality, the created and mechanical nature, of film.” Wheeler Winston Dixon wrote that "the film acts upon us, addressing us, viewing us as we view it, until the film itself becomes a gaze, rather than an object to be gazed upon.” J.D. Connor considered Remedial Reading Comprehension to be an "odd intervention" in the structural film movement, in that it retains "the Romantic interest in dreams and personae" away from which avant-garde cinema had been moving.

== See also ==
- List of American films of 1970
