= Landscape Suicide =

1987 crime and drama film by James Benning

- Directed by: James Benning
- Written by: James Benning
- Produced by: James Benning
- Cinematography: James Benning
- Release date: September 17, 1987
- Running time: 95 min.
- Country: United States
- Language: English

Landscape Suicide is a 1987 American crime and drama film directed and produced by James Benning. The film stars Rhonda Bell and Elion Sucher in the lead roles.

== Background ==
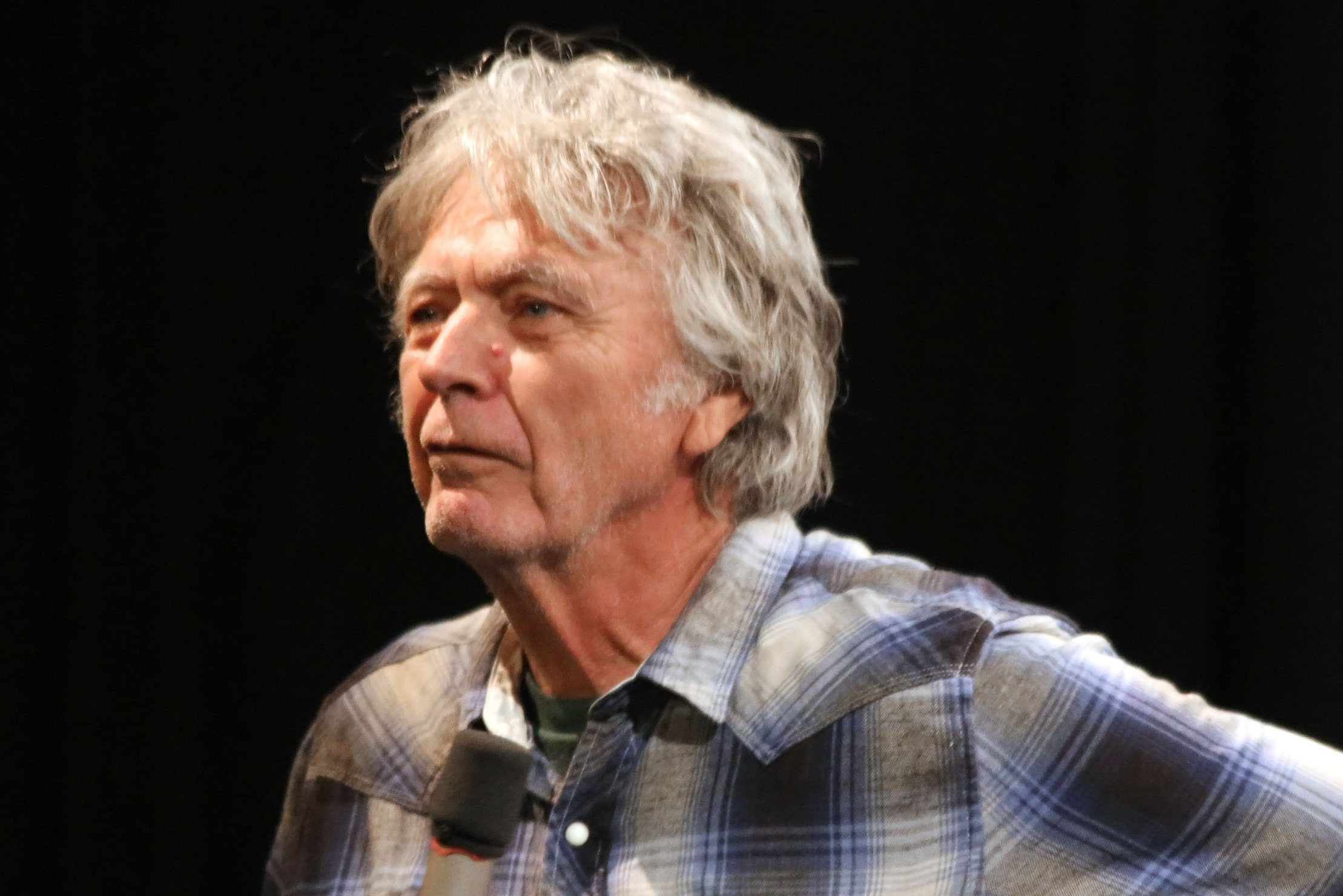
Director James Benning in 2012

Prior to the release of Landscape Suicide, Benning had already built a reputation for his exceedingly long, stationary camera shots of landscapes and industrial scenes. Landscape Suicide sought to combine his structuralist approach with documentary filmmaking.

== Plot ==
The film recounts and parallels two murders that took place 30 years apart. The first half of the film is based on the murder of Kirsten Costas, who was stabbed by her high-school friend Bernadette Protti in Northern California in early 1984. The second half is devoted to the infamous homicides and taxidermies committed by Ed Gein in Wisconsin in the 1950s.

== Reception ==
In a contemporary review, Chicago Tribune film critic Dave Kehr awarded the film three and a half stars and wrote: "It's part of Benning's project in Landscape Suicide to reclaim these deaths from the realm of popular fiction and place them again in a real world. His method is, alternatively, both to refuse to look (the killings, made familiar and even banal by their endless cinematic representation, are not depicted) and to look harder than anyone else. ... The prosperous California suburb is linked to the depressed Midwestern farm town through a shared sense of isolation, desolation and quiet despair. We finally come to understand that both of these towns are located in the same place, somewhere in the dark recesses of the American Dream."

== Availability ==
The film was released on DVD by Edition Filmmusuem alongside his 1984 film American Dreams: Lost and Found in October 2011.

== Cast ==
- Rhonda Bell as Bernadette Protti
- Elion Sucher as Ed Gein
