= The Girl Chewing Gum =

1976 British film by John Smith

- Frame from the film
- Directed by: John Smith
- Release date: 1976
- Running time: 12 minutes
- Country: UK
- Language: English

The Girl Chewing Gum is a 1976 British avant-garde short film directed by John Smith.

== Background ==
The film, made as the ideological opposition to mainstream cinema, was inspired by a scene in François Truffaut's 1973 film Day for Night in which the director gives instructions to the actors, and even tells a dog to urinate on a lamppost.

== Summary ==
At Stamford Road in Dalston Junction of east London, the camera follows pedestrians, cars and birds while a narrator, who appears to be the (fictional) director behind the camera, seems to direct their actions.

== Legacy ==
The film is widely acknowledged as one of the most important avant-garde films of the 20th century.

The Girl Chewing Gum was preserved by the Academy Film Archive in 2019.

== Similar works ==
- 1973: The aforementioned Academy Award-winning Day for Night by François Truffaut
- 2011: The 2 min 28 sec Swedish short film Fågel däruppe by Mårten Nilsson

== See also ==
- Auteur theory
- Postmodernist film
- Structural film
