= James Benning (film director) =

American filmmaker

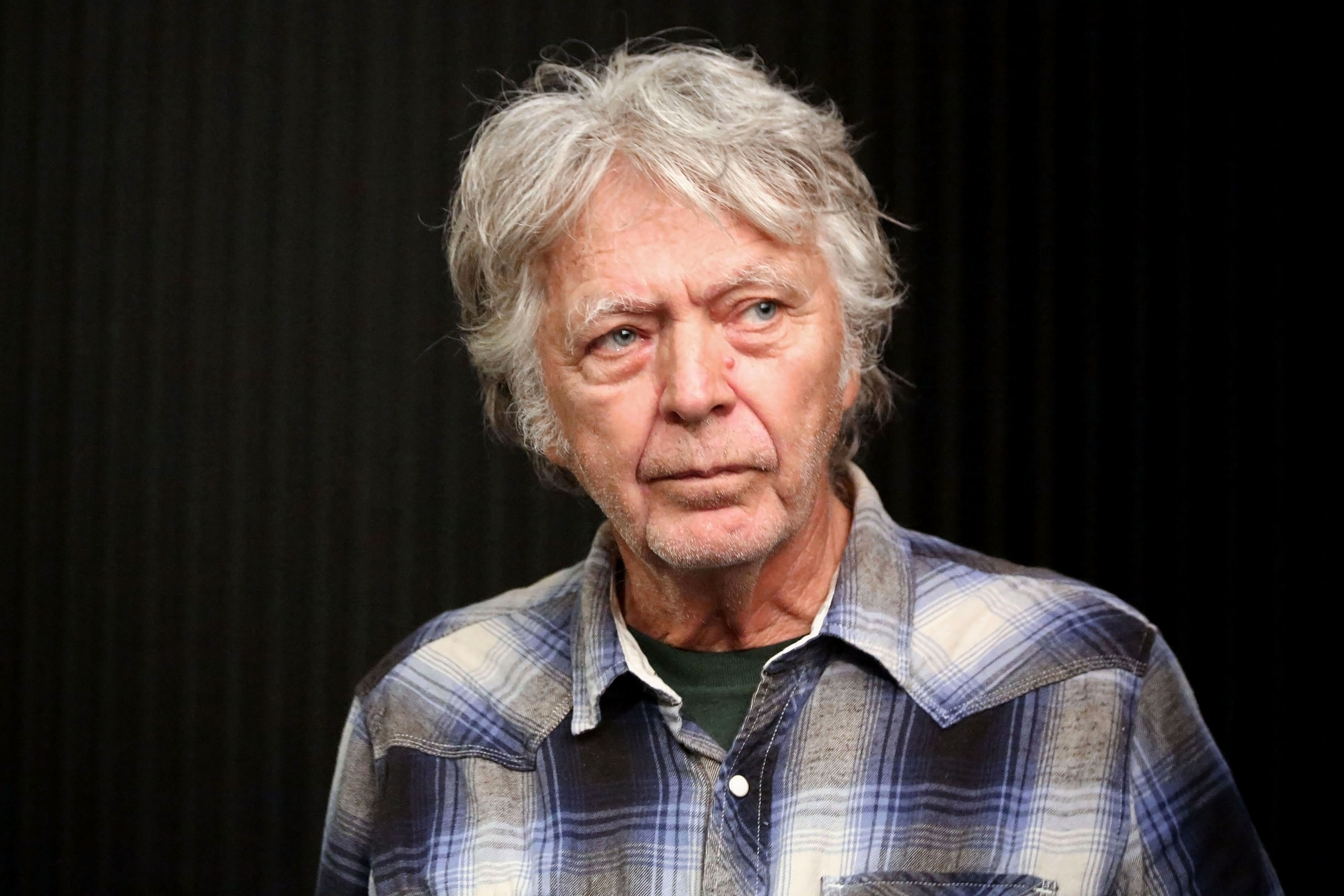
- Benning in 2012.
- Born: 1942 (age 83–84); Milwaukee, Wisconsin, U.S.
- Education: University of Wisconsin–Milwaukee; University of Wisconsin-Madison
- Years active: 1972 – present
- Children: 1, Sadie Benning

James Benning (born 1942) is an American independent filmmaker and educator. Over the course of his 40-year career Benning has made over twenty-five feature-length films that have shown in many different venues across the world. Since 1987, he has taught at California Institute of the Arts (CalArts). He is known as a minimalist filmmaker.

== Early life and education ==
James Benning was born in 1942 in Milwaukee, Wisconsin. Benning played baseball for the first twenty years of his life. He earned an undergraduate and master's degree in mathematics at the University of Wisconsin–Milwaukee, which he attended on a baseball scholarship. Benning experienced a political awakening and racial consciousness during the late 1960s, participating in civil rights protests led by Father James Groppi in segregated Milwaukee.

Benning dropped out of graduate school to forfeit his military deferment since his friends, who were mostly not in school, were being drafted and dying in Vietnam. Benning instead joined the War on Poverty, teaching children of migrant workers in Colorado how to read and write, and helping to start a commodities food program that fed people living in poverty in the Missouri Ozarks. Benning often uses this background as part of his film work.

At the age of 33, Benning received an MFA from the University of Wisconsin–Madison where he had studied with David Bordwell.

For the next four years he taught filmmaking at Northwestern University and CalArts (1988—present).

== Film ==
Benning was hailed cinema's voice of the Midwest with his 1976/1978 films, 11 x 14 and One Way Boogie Woogie, made in Chicago and Milwaukee and the surrounding rural region. In 1980, Benning moved to lower Manhattan, where, with the aid of grants and funding from German Television, he continued to make films, most notably, American Dreams (1984) and Landscape Suicide (1986). Leaving New York after eight years, Benning moved west to teach film/video at California Institute of the Arts, and has taught there ever since. In the early 1990s Benning made a series of text/image films: North on Evers (1991), Deseret (1995), Four Corners (1997), and UTOPIA (1998), often invoking histories of how antagonistic cultural and economic agendas over land use shape landscapes and configure social environments.

Benning has employed diverse methods, themes, structures, and aesthetics, investigating narrative and anti-narrative modes, personal history, race, collective memory, place, industry, and landscape. His philosophy of "landscape as a function of time," and "Looking and Listening" (which is also the name of a course taught by Benning) is particularly evident in his films since 1999 in the form of fixed, stable shots. For instance, each of El Valley Centro, Los, and Sogobi—The California Trilogy (2000–2001) is composed of 35 2½ minute shots. Nightfall (2012) consists of a single 98-minute shot made at a high elevation in the woods in the west Sierras that begins in late afternoon as the sun is going down and ends in near blackness.

Benning's use of duration reflects his accord with Henry David Thoreau's passage from Walden, "No method nor discipline can supersede the necessity of being forever on the alert. What is a course of history, or philosophy, or poetry, no matter how well selected, or the best society, or the most admirable routine of life, compared with the discipline of looking at what is to be seen?"

Benning divides his time between Val Verde, California, and a small town in the Sierra Nevada north of Bakersfield. There, in 2007, Benning built a replica of the cabin Thoreau constructed in 1845 on Walden Pond. The following year Benning erected a copy of the cabin Ted Kaczynski built in 1971 in Montana. Inside the cabins Benning has installed a number of copies he made of paintings by artists that have deeply inspired him, including Bill Traylor, Henry Darger, and Mose Tolliver. These locations are near to California Institute of the Arts where he is teaching in the film department.

== Publication ==
Benning published a book of poems titled Thirty Years to Life in 1973, and Fifty Years to Life, Texts from Eight Films by James Benning in 2000, both with Two Pants Press in Madison, Wisconsin. Reinhard Wulf's feature-length documentary, James Benning: Circling the Image, was released in 2003. In 2007, the Austrian Film Museum also published the first substantial monograph on the filmmaker, James Benning, edited by Barbara Pichler and Claudia Slanar. In 2011, Julie Ault (ed.) collaborated with Benning on the book (FC) Two Cabins by JB, published with A.R.T. Press. Scores of reviews, articles, and essays on Benning's work, as well as interviews with the filmmaker have appeared in publications worldwide.

== Medium ==
Benning worked exclusively in 16mm until the increasing obsolescence of the medium necessitated he convert to digital. His first digital film was Ruhr (2009), commissioned by Werner Ruzicka for the Duisburger Filmwoche. Digital filmmaking allowed him to branch out in different directions including re-makes of Faces (2011) and Easy Rider (2012), as well as the two-hour one shot film Nightfall (2011). Benning's work has always traversed the film sphere and the art field, finding constituencies in both. He made 16mm installations at Art Park (1977), the Walker Art Center (1978), and the Whitney Museum of American Art (1980), and has recently created digital installations at Las Cienegas Projects, Los Angeles, (2011), 21er Haus, Museum of Contemporary Art, Vienna (2012), and Argos, Centrum Voor Kunst en Media, Brussels (2012).

== Distribution ==
Benning is represented by neugerriemschneider, Berlin. He continues to distribute his own films, as he has for his entire career. Benning has been supported by grants from the Rockefeller Foundation, the National Endowment for the Arts, the Guggenheim Foundation, the American Film Institute, New York State Council on the Arts, the Wisconsin Arts Board, and the University Film Association. From the mid-1990s to the mid-2000s Werner Deutsch and Cologne-based WDR-TV supported Benning's work with commissions and the purchase of broadcast rights. The Austrian Film Museum in Vienna is restoring and archiving all of Benning's 16mm films as well as, over time, producing DVDs of the works. The Academy Film Archive, in conjunction with the Austrian Film Museum, preserved Benning's film Chicago Loop in 2013.

== Filmography ==
Date	Name	Medium	Duration	Notes
1971	Did You Ever Hear That Cricket Sound?	16mm, black and white	1 minute	
1972	Time and a Half	16mm, black and white	17 minutes	
1972	Ode to Muzak	16mm, color	3 minutes	
1972	Art Hist. 101	16mm, black and white	17 minutes	
1973	Michigan Avenue	16mm, color	6 minutes	co-created with Bette Gordon.
1973	Honeylane Road			
1973	57			
1974	I-94	16mm, color	3 minutes	co-created with Bette Gordon.
1974	Gleem			
1974	8½ × 11	16mm, color	32 minutes	
1975	The United States of America	16mm, color	27 minutes	co-created with Bette Gordon.
1975	Saturday Night	16mm, color	3 minutes	
1975	An Erotic Film			
1975	9-1-75	16mm, color	22 minutes	
1975	3 Minutes on the Dangers of Film Recording	16mm, black and white with tint	3 minutes	
1976	Chicago Loop	16mm, color	8 minutes	
1976	A to B	16mm, color	2 minutes	
1977	One Way Boogie Woogie	16mm, color	60 minutes	
1977	11 × 14	16mm, color	80 minutes	65-shot narrative featuring a man's affair, a young hitchhiker and a lesbian couple traveling the Midwestern United States.
1978	Grand Opera	16mm, color	81 minutes	
1978	Four Oil Wells	16mm, color, installation	continuous	has been lost.
1979	Oklahoma	16mm, color, installation	continuous	was on a 4 screen installation, has been lost.
1980	Double Yodel	16mm, color, installation	continuous	has been lost.
1981	Last Dance	16mm, color, installation	continuous	has been lost.
1982	Him and Me	16mm, color	88 minutes	
1984	American Dreams: Lost and Found	16mm, color	55 minutes	Benning's Hank Aaron memorabilia with excerpts from Arthur Bremer's diary
1985	O Panama	16mm, color	28 minutes	co-created with Burt Barr.
1986	Landscape Suicide	16mm, color	95 minutes	
1989	Used Innocence	16mm, color	95 minutes	
1991	North on Evers	16mm, color	87 minutes	
1995	Deseret	16mm, color	82 minutes	
1997	Four Corners	16mm, color	80 minutes	
1998	Utopia	16mm, color	93 minutes	
2000	El Valley Centro (California Trilogy part 1)	16mm, color	90 minutes	
2001	Los (California Trilogy part 2)	16mm, color	90 minutes	
2001	Sogobi (California Trilogy part 3)	16mm, color	90 minutes	
2001	B-52 (sound only)			
2004	13 Lakes	16mm, color	133 minutes	added to National Film Registry in 2014.
2004	Ten Skies	16mm, color	101 minutes	
2005	One Way Boogie Woogie / 27 Years Later	16mm, color	121 minutes	
2007	Casting a Glance	16mm, color	80 minutes	
2007	RR	16mm, color	110 minutes	
2009	Ruhr	digital, color	122 minutes	
2010	John Krieg Exiting the Falk Corporation in 1971	digital, black and white, installation	71 minutes	2 screen installation, with 2 objects.
2010	Pig Iron	digital, color, installation	31 minutes	2 screen installation.
2010	Faces	digital, black and white, silent	130 minutes	
2011	Twenty Cigarettes	digital, color, single channel installation	98 minutes	
2011	Nightfall	digital, color	98 minutes	
2011	Two Cabins	digital, color, installation	31 minutes	2 screen installation.
2011	small roads	digital, color	104 minutes	
2012	Easy Rider	digital, color	96 minutes	
2012	The War	digital, color	56 minutes	
2012	Stemple Pass	digital, color	123 minutes	
2013	BNSF	digital, color	193 minutes	
2013	Natural History	digital, color	77 minutes	
2014	Farocki	digital, color, silent	77 minutes	
2016	Spring Equinox	digital, color		
2016	Measuring Change	digital, color		
2017	L. Cohen	digital, color	45 minutes	A film centered around time and change on an Oregon farm field, featuring a Leonard Cohen song.
2020	Maggie's Farm	digital, color	84 minutes	Shot at California Institute of the Arts
2022	The United States of America	digital, color	97 minutes	World Premiere at 72nd Berlin International Film Festival
2022	Allensworth	digital, color	65 minutes	
2024	Breathless	digital, color	87 minutes	World Premiere at Cinema du Réel
2025	little boy			World Premiere at 75th Berlin International Film Festival
2026	Eight Bridges			World Premiere at 76th Berlin International Film Festival

== Personal life ==
Benning's only child is the artist Sadie Benning, born in 1973.

== See also ==
- Slow cinema
- Slow movement
- Art film

== Further publications ==
- Barbara Pichler, Claudia Slanar (Ed.): James Benning. FilmmuseumSynemaPublikationen Vol. 6, Vienna 2007, ISBN 978-3-901644-23-8.
- James Benning, American Dreams / Landscape Suicide, Edition Filmmuseum, 2-disc set, 2011 Österreichisches Filmmuseum
- James Benning, casting a glance / RR, Edition Filmmuseum, 2-disc set, 2012, Österreichisches Filmmuseum
- James Benning, California Trilogy, Edition Filmmuseum, 2-disc set, 2012, Österreichisches Filmmuseum
- James Benning, Deseret / Four Corners, Edition Filmmuseum, 2-disc set, 2013, Österreichisches Filmmuseum
- James Benning, natural history / Ruhr, Edition Filmmuseum, 2-disc set, 2014, Österreichisches Filmmuseum
- James Benning, 11x14 / One Way Boogie Woogie/27 Years Later, Edition Filmmuseum, 2-disc set, 2018, Österreichisches Filmmuseum
- James Benning, Grand Opera. An Historical Romance / O Panama, Edition Filmmuseum, 2021, Österreichisches Filmmuseum
