= T,O,U,C,H,I,N,G =

1968 short film

T,O,U,C,H,I,N,G is a 12-minute short film directed by Paul Sharits in 1968. It uses many of the strategies characteristic of the structural film movement, including a static frame, flicker effects, flash frames and continual audio and visual repetition. The audio track consists exclusively of the filmmaker uttering the word "destroy" over and over until the word begins to lose its meaning and creates the impression of different combinations of words being spoken.

Unlike many clearly algorithmically-driven films of the structural film movement, T,O,U,C,H,I,N,G does not simply follow a sequence of mathematical transformation, but deploys combinations of audio and visual effects to elicit emotional and psychological responses in viewers.
