= Structural film =

Experimental film movement

Structural film was an avant-garde experimental film movement prominent in the United States in the 1960s and a related movement was developed in the United Kingdom in the 1970s. Notable participants include Americans Hollis Frampton and Ernie Gehr, Canadian artist Michael Snow and British filmmaker John Smith.

== Overview ==
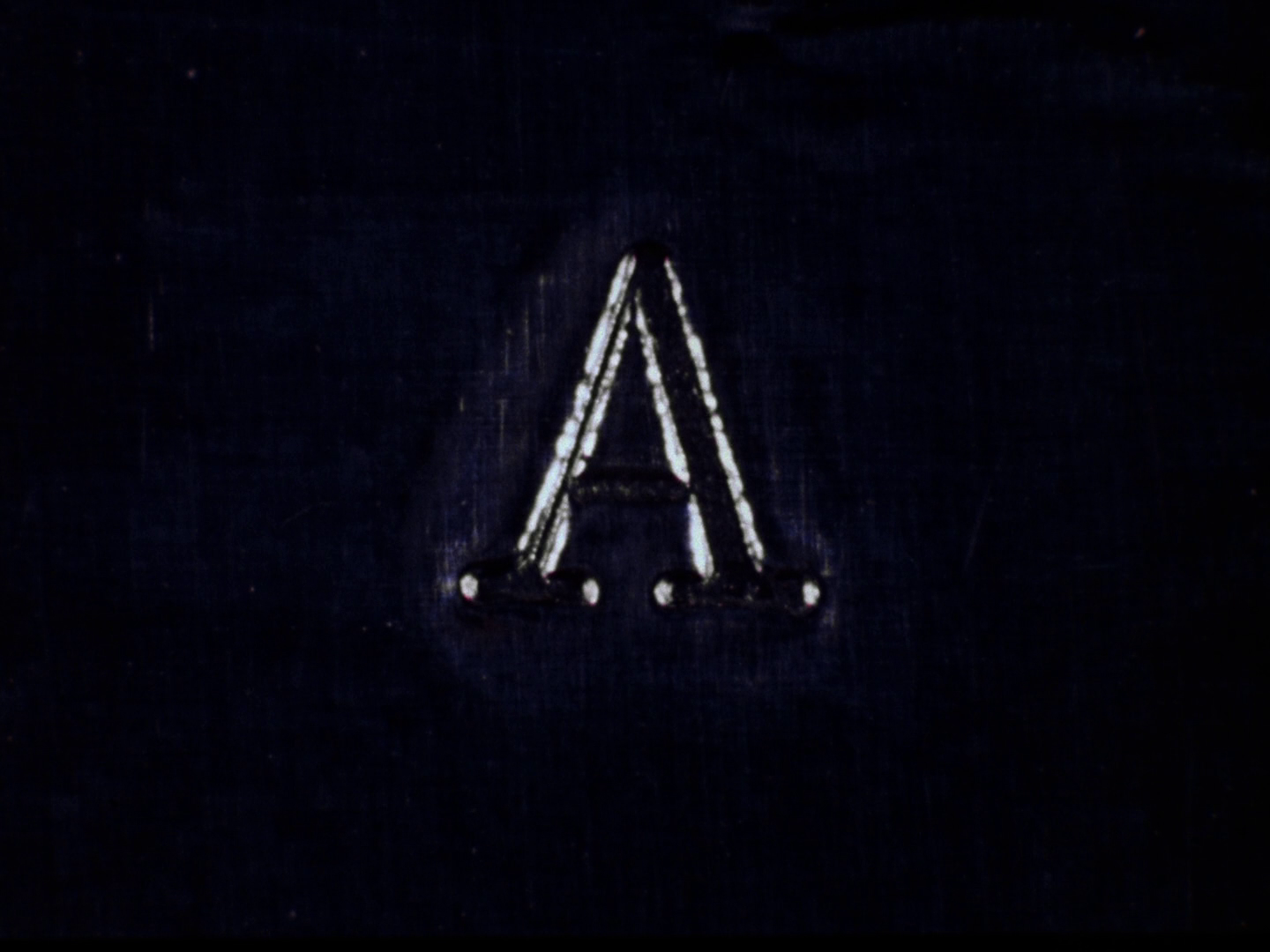
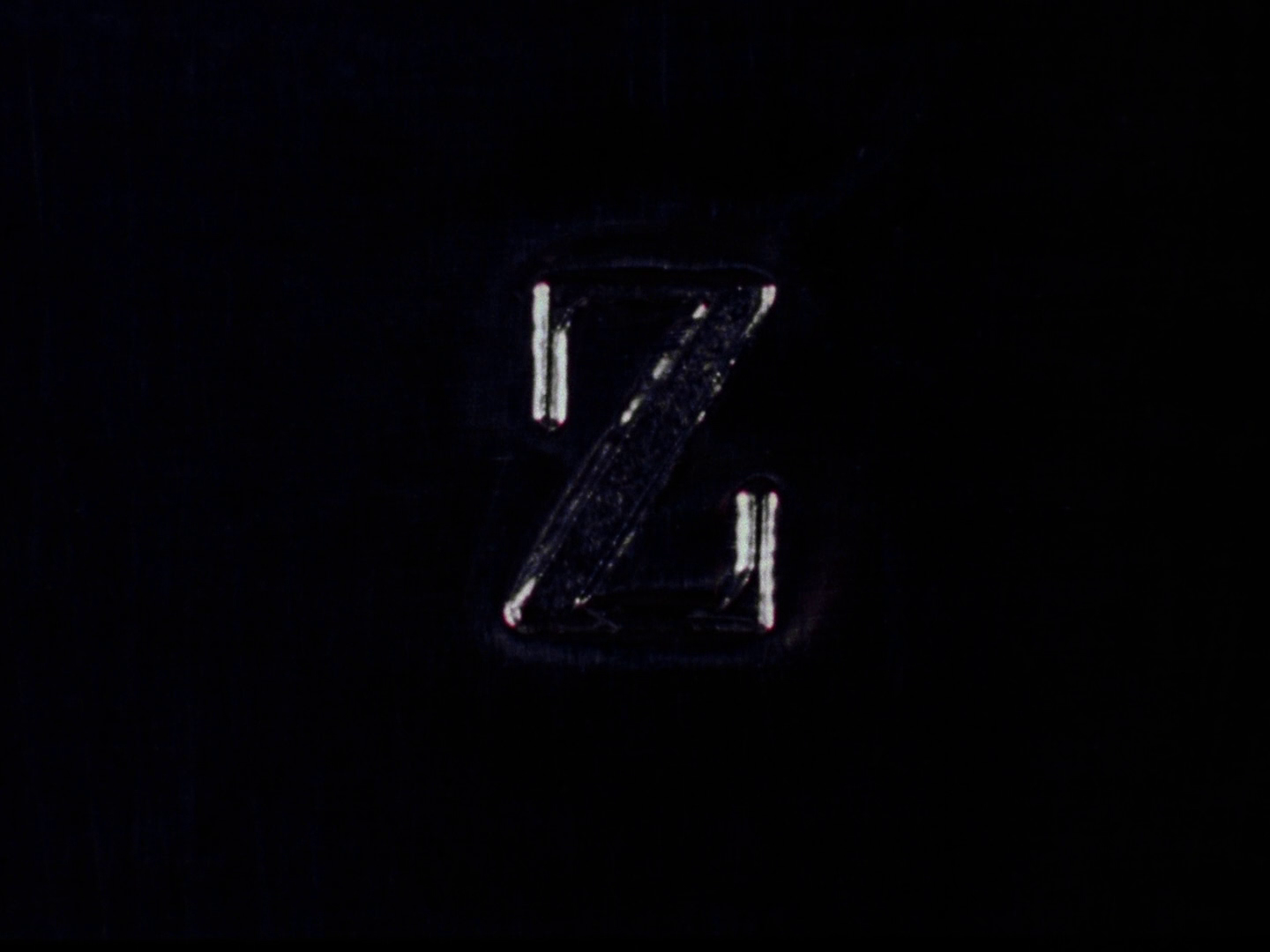
Zorns Lemma (1970) by Hollis Frampton uses the Latin alphabet as a structuring device.

The term was coined by P. Adams Sitney who noted that film artists had moved away from the complex and condensed forms of cinema practiced by such artists as Sidney Peterson and Stan Brakhage. "Structural film" artists pursued instead a more simplified, sometimes even predetermined art. The shape of the film was crucial, leaving the content peripheral. This term should not be confused with the literary and philosophical term structuralism.

== History ==
=== United States ===
The earliest films associated with the structural film movement emerged during the mid 1960s. New York filmmakers from this period whose work was later associated with the term were Tony Conrad, Hollis Frampton, Ernie Gehr, Ken Jacobs, George Landow, Michael Snow, and Joyce Wieland.

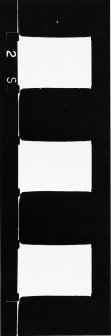
The Flicker (1966) by Tony Conrad produces a flicker effect with alternating solid black and white frames.

The earliest flicker films associated with structural film were made in 1966. Conrad, a minimalist musician, made The Flicker, where solid black and white frames are arranged in different frequencies to produce a flicker effect. Visual artist Paul Sharits made several flicker films—Ray Gun Virus, Piece Mandala/End War, and the Fluxus film Word Movie—in an effort to revisit "the basic mechanisms of motion pictures…working toward a new conception of cinema." The two filmmakers made their respective works without knowledge of each other's practices or earlier examples of flicker films.

Snow's Wavelength (1967) quickly became a turning point. The film shows a loft for 45 minutes from a fixed perspective, progressively zooming in with variations in the image coming from color gels, different film stocks, superimpositions, and negative images. It won the International Experimental Film Festival and was soon recognized as the movement's most significant work.

By the late 1960s, the structural film movement coincided with a shift in experimental cinema away from 1960s counterculture and toward closer affiliations with academia and film theory. In 1969 Film Culture magazine published P. Adams Sitney's essay "Structural Film", in which he coined the term. He published two revisions in the following years. Anthology Film Archives, opened in 1970, was established as an exhibition venue for avant-garde cinema and included structural films in its programming.

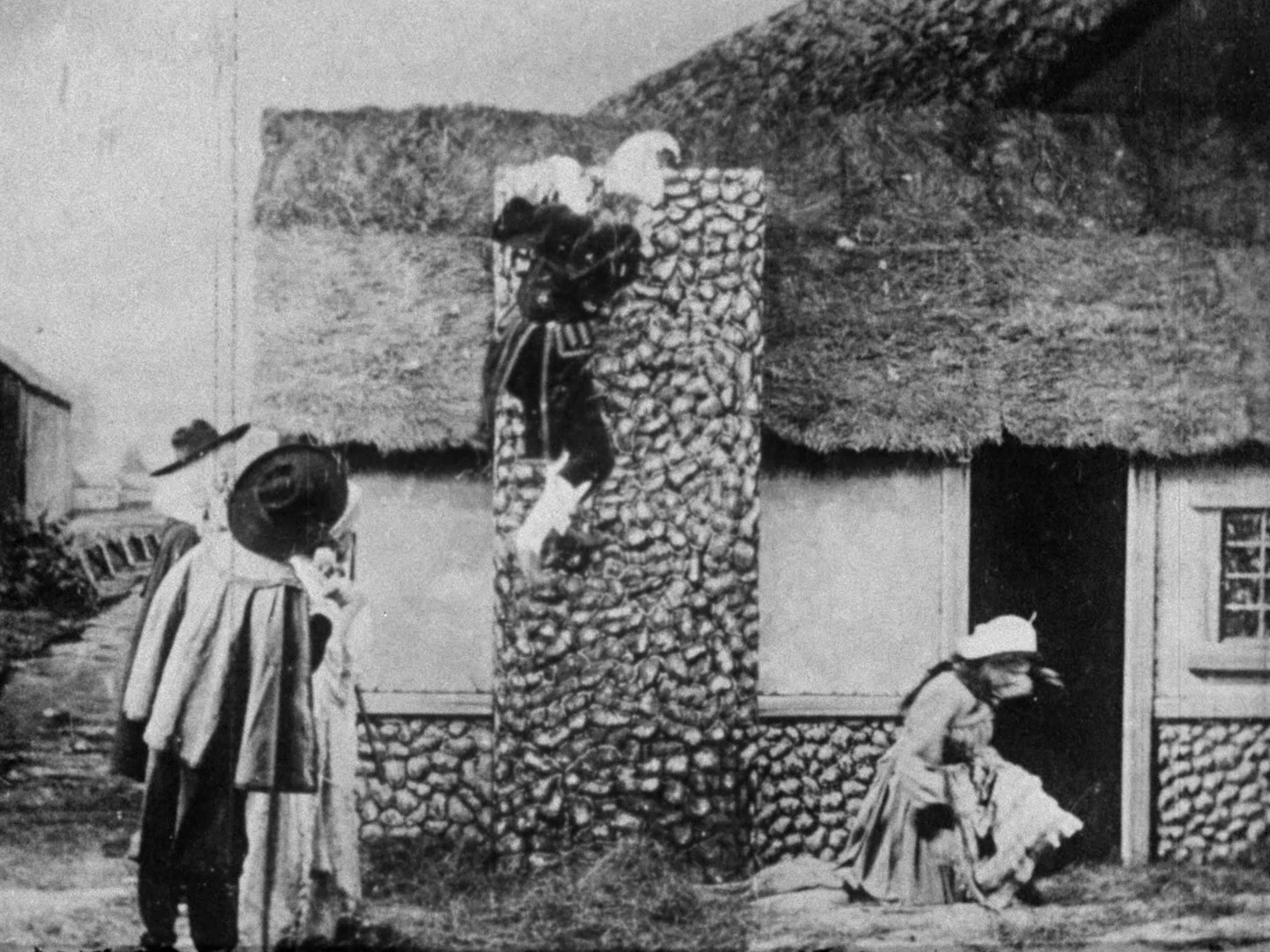
In Tom, Tom, the Piper's Son (1969), Ken Jacobs rephotographs the 1905 Billy Bitzer film of the same name.

The structural film movement was concurrent with a renaissance of the Library of Congress's Paper Print Collection. Since the early 1950s, the library had been making film negatives from its archive of paper prints, used to establish copyright on early cinematic works until 1912. These new prints began to circulate starting in the mid to late 1960s. The sudden availability of these prints generated interest in their intermediate state between still and moving image. Filmmakers such as Jacobs and Frampton made use of the Paper Print Collection as source material for new films.

=== United Kingdom ===
In the United Kingdom, a related "structural/materialist" film movement emerged during the 1970s, similarly focused on the material properties of film. These filmmakers, often associated with the London Film-Makers' Co-op, included David Crosswaite, Fred Drummond, John Du Cane, Mike Dunford, Gill Eatherley, Peter Gidal, Roger Hammond, Mike Leggett, Malcolm Le Grice, and William Raban.

== Characteristics ==
Sitney identified four formal characteristics common in Structural films, but all four characteristics are not usually present in any single film:

- fixed camera position (an apparently fixed framing)
- flicker effect (strobing due to the intermittent nature of film)
- loop printing
- rephotography (off the screen)

It has been noted by George Maciunas that these characteristics are also present in Fluxus films.

== Key films ==
- Sleep (Andy Warhol, 1963)
- The Flicker (Tony Conrad, 1965)
- All My Life (Bruce Baillie, 1966)
- 15/67 TV (Kurt Kren, 1967)
- Wavelength (Michael Snow, 1966–67)
- T,O,U,C,H,I,N,G (Paul Sharits, 1968)
- One Second in Montreal (Michael Snow, 1969)
- Tom, Tom, The Piper's Son (Ken Jacobs, 1969)
- Necrology (Standish Lawder, 1970)
- Variations of a Cellophane Wrapper (David Rimmer, 1970)
- Zorns Lemma (Hollis Frampton, 1970)
- Serene Velocity (Ernie Gehr, 1970)
- Remedial Reading Comprehension (George Landow, 1971)
- Print Generation (J.J. Murphy, 1973/4)
- Damage (Wheeler Winston Dixon, 1974)
- Hand Held Day (Gary Beydler, 1974)
- Pasadena Freeway Stills (Gary Beydler, 1974)
- The United States of America (James Benning and Bette Gordon, 1975)
- Black Forest Trading Post (Andrew Lugg and Stuart Klein, 1976)
- The Girl Chewing Gum (John Smith, 1976)
- Thunder (Takashi Ito, 1982)
- American Dreams: Lost and Found (James Benning, 1984)
- Landscape Suicide (James Benning, 1986)
- Mnemosyne Mother of Muses (Larry Gottheim, 1986/7)
- The Way Things Go (Peter Fischli and David Weiss, 1987)
- Passage à l'acte (Martin Arnold, 1993)
- Forest-Views (Bart Vegtar, 1999)
- Window Work (Lynne Sachs, 2000)
- *Corpus Callosum (Michael Snow, 2002)

== Key filmmakers ==
- Christina Battle
- Christine Lucy Latimer
- Bette Gordon
- James Benning
- Tony Conrad
- Hollis Frampton
- Ernie Gehr
- Richard Kerr
- Standish Lawder
- Birgit and Wilhelm Hein
- Kurt Kren
- George Landow (a.k.a. Owen Land)
- David Rimmer
- Paul Sharits
- Michael Snow
- Joyce Wieland
- Sharon Lockhart

== Legacy ==
Ken Jacobs's Tom, Tom, the Piper's Son and Ernie Gehr's Serene Velocity were each inducted into the National Film Registry.

Several structural films have been included on DVD sets, including the works of Hollis Frampton (released by The Criterion Collection as a part of A Hollis Frampton Odyssey) and Standish Lawder's Necrology which appeared on the 2008 DVD set entitled Treasures IV: American Avant-Garde Film, 1947-1986.

== See also ==
- Non-narrative film
- Still image film
- Collage film
- Minimalist film
- Maximalist film

== Bibliography ==
- Gidal, Peter. Materialist Film Routledge; First Edition, Second Impression edition (Mar. 1989).
- de Lauretis, Teresa and Stephen Heath (eds). The Cinematic Apparatus. Macmillan, 1980.
- Habib, André (2017). "Drafts and Fragments: Reflections around Bill Morrison and the Paper Print Collection". In Herzogenrath, Bernd (ed.). The Films of Bill Morrison: Aesthetics of the Archive. Amsterdam University Press. ISBN 978-90-8964-996-6.
- Habib, André (2021). "Finding Early Cinema in the Avant-Garde: Research and Investigation". In Bernardi, Joanne; Cherchi Usai, Paolo; Williams, Tami; Yumibe, Joshua (eds.). Provenance and Early Cinema. Indiana University Press. doi:10.2307/j.ctv1b742kt.25. ISBN 978-0-253-05299-5.
- Heath, Stephen. Questions of Cinema. Bloomington: Indiana UP, 1981.
- Gidal, Peter, ed. (1978). Structural Film Anthology. British Film Institute. ISBN 0-85170-0535.
- Hoberman, J. (1984). "After Avant-Garde Film". In Wallis, Brian (ed.). Art After Modernism: Rethinking Representation. The New Museum of Contemporary Art. ISBN 978-0-87923-563-5.
- Maciunas, George. "Some Comments on Structural Film by P. Adams Sitney." Film Culture, No. 47, 1969.
- Newland, Paul (2015). British Films of the 1970s. Manchester University Press. ISBN 978-0-7190-8225-2.
- O'Pray, Michael. The British Avant-Garde Film 1926 to 1995: An Anthology of Writings. Indiana University Press, 2003.
- Sitney, P. Adams. Visionary Film: The American Avant-Garde 1943-1978. Second Edition, Oxford University Press 1979
