= Listo-Film =

Austrian film company

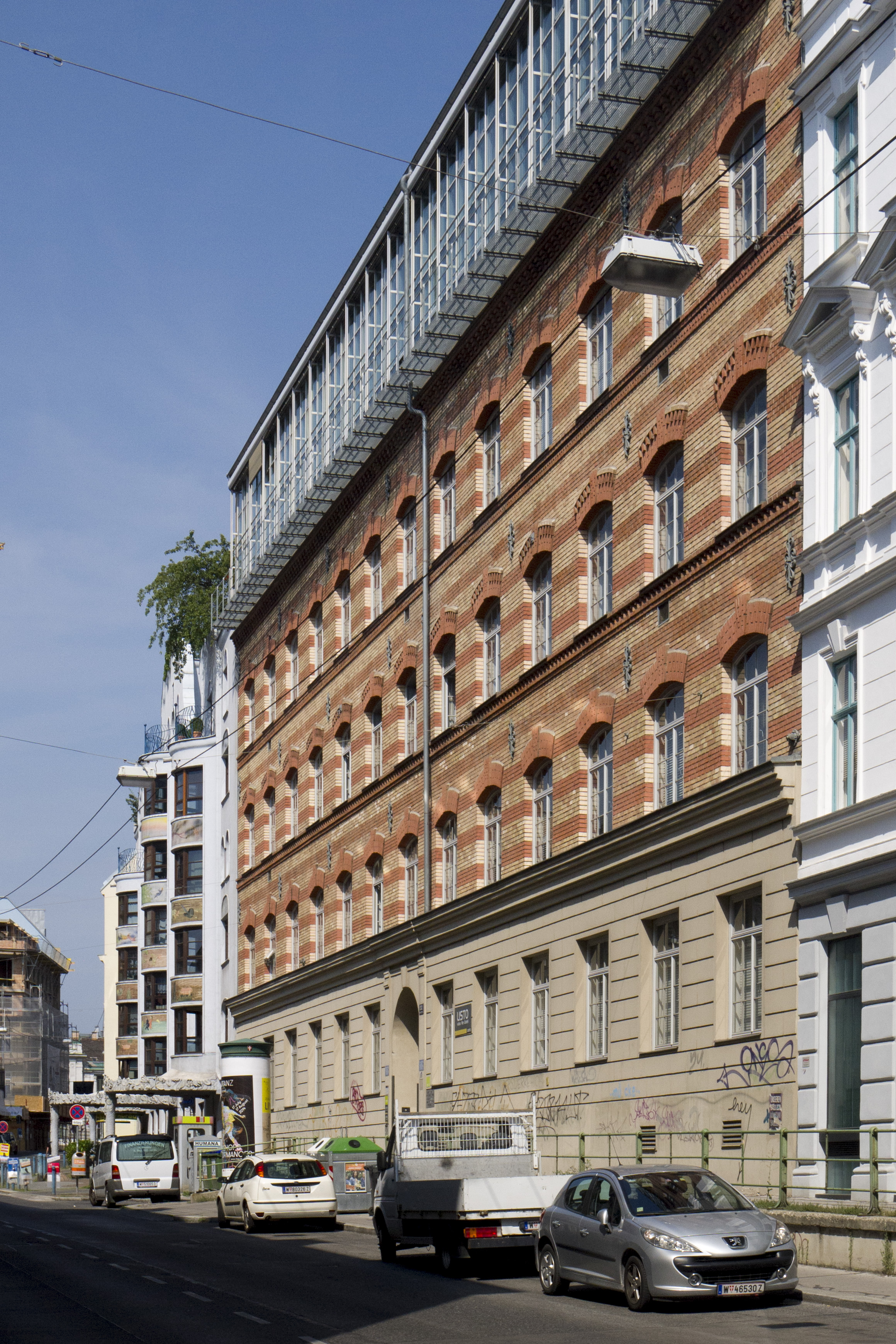
Listo Film headquarters in Vienna-Mariahilf.

Listo Film was a film company based in Vienna from 1919 to 2005, which has continued as Listo Videofilm since 2005. The company was founded in 1919 as a film production company, but ceased production in the post-war period, and subsequently focused exclusively on film copying. With the founding of its subsidiary Listo Videofilm in 1985, the former production company established a new business area as a specialist in digital post-production, 3D animation, and special effects. In 2005, Listo Videofilm finally acquired the film copying facility, premises, and assets of Listo Film.

The Listo Film building is one of the oldest surviving film studios in Europe. However, a project launched in the 1990s to establish an "Austrian Media Museum" in this building failed.

== Silent Film Era ==
In 1919, the Jewish merchants Heinrich Moses Lipsker and Adolf Stotter, with the participation of the cigarette tube manufacturer Adolf Ambor, founded Listo Film, whose name was composed of the initials of the two founders' surnames. Robert Reich was hired as production manager. The company's founding coincided with the approximately five-year period in Austrian film history during which the post-World War I inflation created a film speculation bubble that spawned numerous film companies and around 550 short and feature films. Since the company, unlike most other film producers, had its own well-equipped studio in the attic, many of these films were shot in the Listo studios. Listo-Film also produced its own films, and was thus one of the most important film companies in Austria during those years.

For example, the Pan-Film production's Orlac's Hands (1924) and Der Rosenkavalier (1926) were filmed at the Listo studios. In addition, significant Jewish silent films were produced in-house, such as East and West (1923) by Sidney Goldin, which featured Molly Picon and Jacob Kalich in the leading roles, who were both stars of Yiddish theater. Jewish identity, caught between assimilation and tradition, also played a central role in other productions such as The Burned Jew (1920), Those Who Were Crucified (1920, and "The Apostate" (1927). Many comedies and dramas were also produced, including "Clothes Make the Man" (1922), in which Hans Moser made his film debut.

Listo Film survived the collapse of the "film bubble" between 1924 and 1926, which coincided with a Europe-wide film industry crisis resulting from the aggressive expansion policies of American film producers and which spelled the end for most Austrian film companies. In 1922, Lipsker and Stotter left the company, and Ambor then ran it alone.

== Early Sound Film Era, National Socialism, and Restitution ==
With the introduction of sound film in Austria around 1930, the studio was no longer up-to-date. The volume of orders never again reached anything close to what it had been in the early 1920s, so Ambor did not invest in converting the studio to sound film, and production ceased in 1931. Listo Film limited itself to developing and copying work. In 1931, Ambor had the premises adapted for the clothing factory Robinson, Rubin & Kalwill, which operated under the name "Erka." In 1935, another section of the building was leased to the Hans Cernik machine factory.

After the annexation of Austria by Nazi Germany, the building was "Aryanized," a process carried out in 1939 by Robert Huber. He thus acquired the Erka clothing factory from its Jewish owners. Adolf Ambor, born Abraham Ambor in 1881 in Andrichau, Galicia, emigrated to England in 1938. His partner, Mathilde Ruhm, and her family took over the company and continued production. Listo Film remained undamaged during the war and was expanded to include a sound studio.

After the war, restitution took place in Austria: Ambor, who returned to Vienna in 1947, had the building returned to him by Huber and leased it again to the entrepreneurs Robinson, Rubin & Kalwill, who had also returned. However, Ambor showed no interest in continuing film production. This was continued by Mathilde Ruhm until the mid-1950s. From then on, the company operated as a film processing and copying facility. Ambor died in Vienna in 1961.

== Founding of Listo Videofilm, End of Listo Film ==
In 1985, Franziska Appel, together with Listo Film and under the direction of Elfriede Posch (niece of Mathilde Ruhm), founded Listo Videofilm GesmbH in the same building with the same logo. Initially, the company focused on the post-production and editing of films, but in subsequent years expanded its activities to increasingly specialized areas of film post-production, including computer-generated special effects and animation.

In the early 1990s, film scholar Ernst Kieninger, in collaboration with architect Manfred Wehdorn, developed a concept for an "Austrian Media Museum – Dream Factory Vienna" in the then-detached front section of the Listo building, which had stood empty since the departure of the "Erka" studios. A committee of proponents to support the project was formed from the Association of Austrian Film Producers, the Federal Economic Chamber, the Ludwig Boltzmann Institute for Communication Research and Listo Videofilm itself; interest in using seminar rooms was expressed by the University of Music and Performing Arts Vienna, to which the Film Academy belongs, as well as for a media workshop by the Ministry of Education. The plans were not realized, however. The listed building was renovated from 1997 to 1999 and today, in addition to being used by Listo Videofilm, serves as an office and residential building.

On 14 April 2005, Listo Film filed for bankruptcy. The company's activities, especially film duplication, were taken over by Listo Videofilm.

Today, Listo Videofilm operates as a film duplication facility and post-production service. Until the founding of Synchro Film in 1985, Listo Film operated Vienna's only film copying facility.

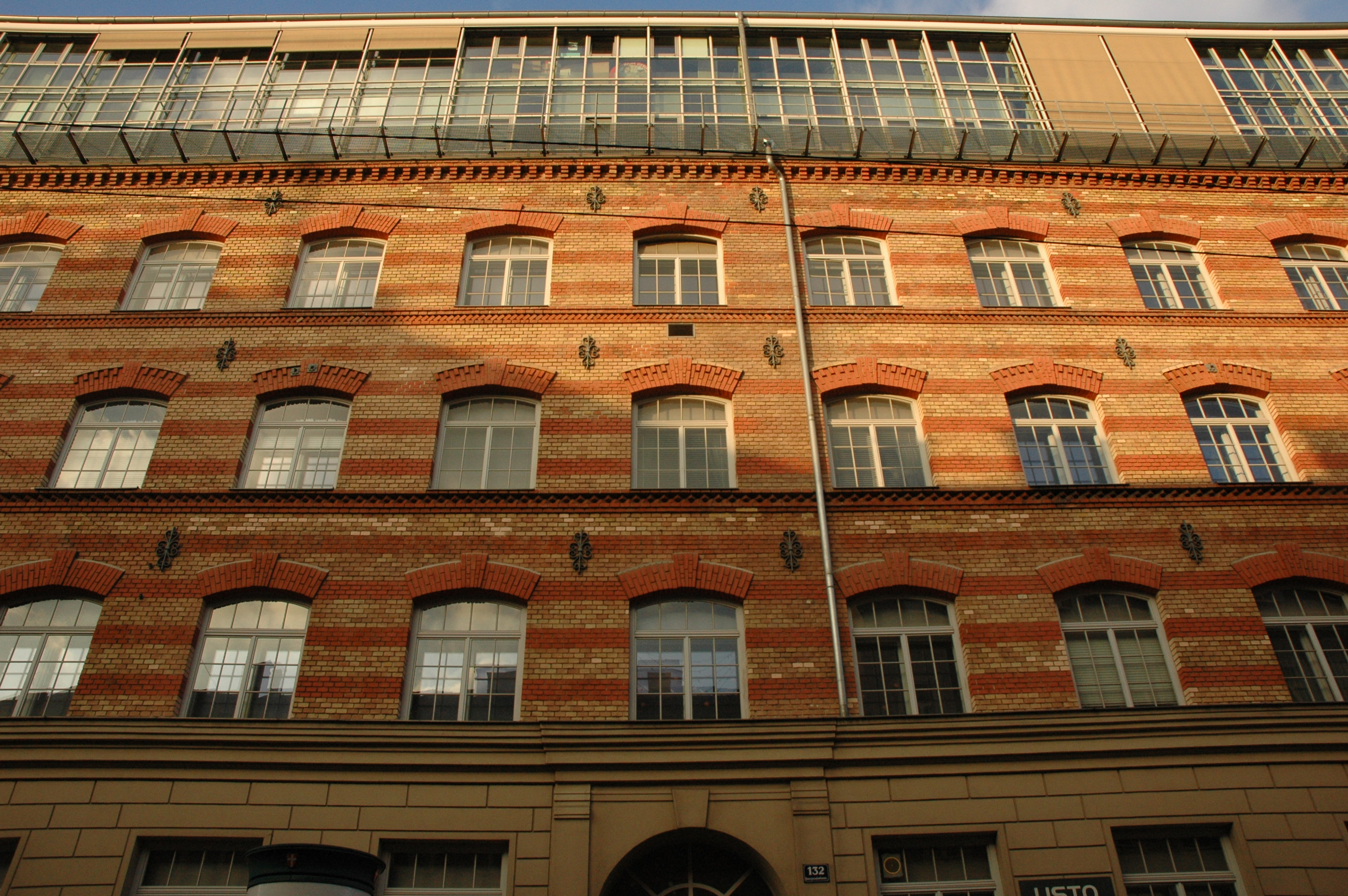
Listo-Film Wien Fassade 2009

== Filmography ==
A selection of films from the Listo Film Production Company (with many of these films only the title is known):

- 1919: They Couldn't Come Together (Director: Ludwig M. Zwingenburg; co-production with Burg-Film)
- 1920: The Burned Jew
- 1920: Those Who Were Crucified (Director: Georg Kundert)
- 1921: The Secrets of a Big City
- 1921: Bob Merker's Last Adventure
- 1921: Autograph Lilli
- 1922: Clothes Make the Man (Director: Hans Steinhoff)
- 1923: East and West (Directors: Sidney M. Goldin, Ivan Abramson; co-production) (with Picon-Film, New York)
- 1924: Orlac's Hands (Director: Robert Wiene)
- 1924: From the Far East
- 1926: Seff on the Path to Strength and Beauty (Advertising film for the Viennese dairy with the comedy duo Cocl & Seff)
- 1927: The Renegade (Director: Alfred Kempf-Desci)
- 1928: Other Women (Director: Heinz Hanus; co-production with Otto-Spitzer-Film)
- 1928: The White Sonata (Director: Louis Seemann)
- 1929: Sensation in the Diamond Club
- 1929: Devotion (Director: Guido Brignone; co-production with Messtro-Film, Berlin)
- 1948: Saxa Loquuntur
- 1953: The Death Arena] (Director: Kurt Meisel; co-production with Bristol-Film Heinz Wolff, Munich)
- 1953: The Great Guilt (1953)
- 1953: The Peasant Rebel (Director: Alfred Lehner)
- 1955: Don't Worry, Franzl (Director: Georg Tressler)

=== Film Copying and Post-Production ===
In Post-Production (Selection):

- 2005: Caché (Director: Michael Haneke)
- 2006: In 3 Days You're Dead (Director: Andreas Prochaska)
- 2007: The Counterfeiters (Director: Stefan Ruzowitzky)
- 2007: Funny Games U.S. (Director: Michael Haneke)
- 2008: Revenge (Director: Götz Spielmann)
- 2008: Let's Make Money (Director: Erwin Wagenhofer)
- 2009: The Bone Man (Director: Wolfgang Murnberger)
- 2009: The White Ribbon – A German Children's Story (Director Michael Haneke)
- 2010: The Accidental Kidnapping of Mrs. Elfriede Ott (Director Andreas Prochaska)
- 2010: Poll (Director Chris Kraus)
- 2011: Breathing (Film)|Breathing (Director Karl Markovics)
- 2011: Lilly the Witch – The Journey to Mandolan (Director Harald Sicheritz)
- 2011: Whores' Glory (Director Michael Glawogger)
- 2012: Love (Director Michael Haneke)
- 2012: Paradise: Love (Director Ulrich Seidl)
