= Susanna Kubelka =

French German-speaking writer (1942–2024)

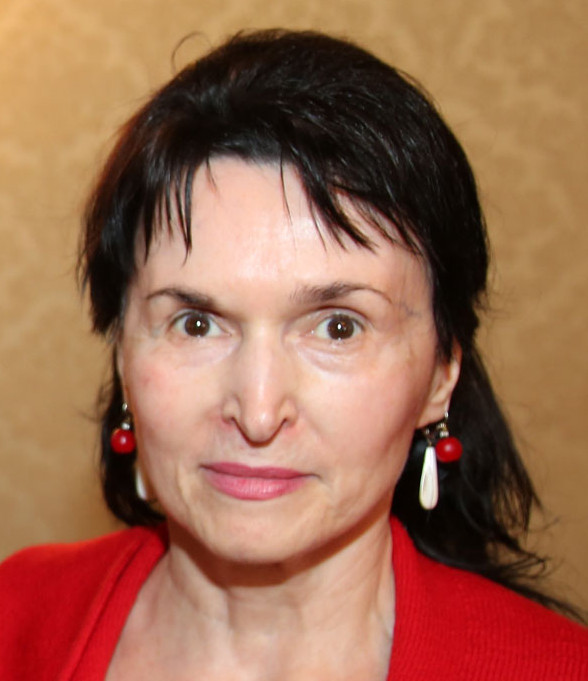
Kubelka in 2015

Susanna Kubelka von Hermanitz (20 September 1942 – 6 May 2024) was an Austrian-born French novelist whose works were written in German.

== Biography ==
She was born on 20 September 1942 in Linz, Austria. Having left high school she briefly worked as a primary school teacher before graduating in English literature. In 1977 she took a Ph.D. with a thesis on the way women were represented in the 18th-century English novel. Later she worked as a journalist for the Vienna newspaper Die Presse. She lived and worked in Australia and England for four years. She was divorced and from 1981 she permanently settled down in Paris. She claimed to favour a vegetarian lifestyle.

Her first book Over Forty at Last was published in 1980. Her most successful novel is Ophelia Learns to Swim of 1987. Her most extensive novel Das gesprengte Mieder (The Broken Girdle; not translated yet) came out in 2000.

Her books have been translated into 29 languages and are published in Germany by Verlagsgruppe Lübbe, in France by Editions Belfond (none in print), and in the United States by MacMillan Publishing Company.

Susanna Kubelka was the sister of the Austrian filmmaker Peter Kubelka. She died on 6 May 2024 in Vienna, at the age of 81.

== Selected works ==
- Endlich über vierzig. Der reifen Frau gehört die Welt (1980)
- Ich fang nochmal an. Glück und Erfolg in der zweiten Karriere (1981)
- Burg vorhanden, Prinz gesucht. Ein heiterer Roman (1983)
- Ophelia lernt schwimmen. Der Roman einer jungen Frau über vierzig (1987)
- Mein Wien (1990)
- Madame kommt heute später (1993)
- Das gesprengte Mieder (2000)
- Der zweite Frühling der Mimi Tulipan (2005)

English translations:

- Over Forty at Last: How to Ignore the "Middle Life" Crisis and Make the Most Out of the Best Years of Your Life, Macmillan (1982) ISBN 0-02-567150-2
