= George Landow (filmmaker) =

American artist and filmmaker (1944–2011)

- Born: George Landow; 1944; New Haven, Connecticut
- Died: June 8, 2011 (aged 66–67); Los Angeles, California
- Occupation: Experimental filmmaker

George Landow (1944 – June 8, 2011), also known as Owen Land, was a painter, writer, photographer and experimental filmmaker. He also worked under the pen names Orphan Morphan (probably a reference to Eugène Ionesco's play The Chairs) and Apollo Jize.

His work is also known to parody the experimental and "structural film" movement, as featured in his 1975 film Wide Angle Saxon. His style of filmmaking is also inspired by Bertolt Brecht, educational films, advertising and television, and employs devices used by such in his films to destroy any sense of "reality", as exhibited in What's Wrong With this Picture 1 and Remedial Reading Comprehension.

Shortly after the release of his film On the Marriage Broker Joke as Cited by Sigmund Freud... (1977), Landow rearranged his name to Owen Land. It is an anagram of "Landow N.E.".

== Early life ==
He was born into a conservative Jewish family before becoming a skeptic in his later years.

According to the film historian Mark Webber, Land made some of his first films as a teenager and his later films, made mostly during the 1960s and 1970s, are some of the first examples of the "structural film" movement. Land's films usually involve word play and have been described by Webber as having humor and wit that separates his films from the "boring" world of avant-garde cinema.

== Education, live theater and retrospectives ==
Land was born and raised in Connecticut, US, and studied drawing, painting, sculpture, industrial design and architecture at Pratt Institute, Art Students League of New York and New York Academy of Art. He graduated with an MFA in painting from New York Academy of Art. He also studied acting and acting improvisation at Goodman Drama School and The Second City in Chicago. His music studies include classical and flamenco guitar, classical piano and music composition and Hindustani classical music at the Ali Akbar Kahn College of Music in San Rafael, California. He taught film production at the School of the Art Institute of Chicago, Northwestern University, San Francisco Art Institute and Art Center College of Design in Pasadena, California. He founded the Experimental Theater Workshop at The Art Institute of Chicago and wrote and directed several musical theater pieces, with original songs and music, including Mechanical Sensuality and Schwimmen mit Wimmen. Retrospectives of Land's films have been held at the Edinburgh International Film Festival in Scotland, the Museum of the Moving Image in Astoria, New York, the International Film Festival Rotterdam in the Netherlands, the Tate Gallery in London, Kunsthalle Bern in Switzerland, and the Whitney Museum of American Art. Until his death, Land was represented by Office Baroque in Brussels, Belgium.

== Death ==
Land was found dead in his Los Angeles apartment on June 8, 2011. His death was announced by Office Baroque on July 13, though the cause of death was not made public.

His last film Dialogues was informed by Land's study of folklore, myth and history, and the theology of all major religions, including Gnosticism and Kabbala. It ironically uses the form of the Platonic dialogue to explore the themes of reincarnation, art criticism and Tantra. It includes pastiches of badly-written well-known Hollywood films, as well as the films of Maya Deren, Stan Brakhage, Jim McBride and others. Dialogues was produced between January 2006 and August 2009 by Eric Michael Kochmer, Benjamin E. Pitts and Skye Le-fever.

== Filmography ==
| Year | Title | Format | Length | Notes |
|---|---|---|---|---|
| 1961 | Two Pieces for the Precarious Life | 16mm | 10 minutes | |
| 1961 | Faulty Pronoun Reference, Comparison and Punctuation of the Restrictive or Non-Restrictive Element | 16mm | 5 minutes | |
| 1961 | A Stringent Prediction at the Early Hermaphroditic Stage | 16mm | 5 minutes | |
| 1962 | Are Era | 8mm | 3 minutes | |
| 1963 | Richard Kraft at the Playboy Club | 8mm | 2 minutes | |
| 1963 | Fleming Faloon Screening | 8mm | 2 minutes | |
| 1963-4 | Fleming Faloon | 16mm | 7 minutes | Color |
| 1964 | Not a Case of Lateral Displacement | 8mm | 8 minutes | |
| 1965 | Leopard Skin | 8mm | 4 minutes | |
| 1965 | Adjacent Yes, But Simultaneous? | 8mm | 3 minutes | |
| 1965 | This Film will be Interrupted after 11 Minutes by a Commercial | 16mm | 12 minutes | |
| 1966 | Film in Which There Appear Edge Lettering, Sprocket Holes, Dirt Particles, Etc. | 16mm | 3:30 minutes | Color; silent |
| 1967 | Bardo Follies | 16mm | 20 minutes | Color; silent |
| 1968 | The Film that Rises to the Surface of Clarified Butter | 16mm | 9 minutes | B/w |
| 1969 | Baroque Slippages | 16mm | 3 minutes | Color; unreleased |
| 1969 | Institutional Quality | 16mm | 5 minutes | Color |
| 1970 | Remedial Reading Comprehension | 16mm | 5 minutes | Color |
| 1971 | What's Wrong With This Picture 1 | 16mm | 5 minutes | B/w and color; silent |
| 1972 | What's Wrong With This Picture 2 | 16mm | 7 minutes | B/w and color; silent |
| 1973 | Thank You Jesus for the Eternal Present | 16mm | 6 minutes | B/w and color |
| 1974 | A Film of Their 1973 Spring Tour Commissioned by Christian World Liberation Front of Berkeley California | 16mm | 12 minutes | Color |
| 1975 | No Sir, Orison! | 16mm | 3 minutes | Color |
| 1975 | Wide Angle Saxon | 16mm | 22 minutes | Color |
| 1976 | New Improved Institutional Quality: In the Environment of Liquids and Nasals a Parasitic Vowel Sometimes Develops | 16mm | 10 minutes | Color |
| 1978 | Diploteratology | 16mm | 7 minutes | Color |
| 1977-9 | On the Marriage Broker Joke as Cited by Sigmund Freud in Wit and its Relation to the Unconscious or Can the Avant-Garde Artist Be Wholed? | 16mm | 18 minutes | Color |
| 1983 | Noli Me Tangere/Don't Touch Me | Video | 6:15 minutes | |
| 1984 | The Box Theory | Video | 15:36 minutes | |
| 1999 | Undesirables (Condensed Version) | 16mm/Video | | |
| 2009 | Dialogues, or A Waist Is A Terrible Thing To Mind | Video | | |

== Legacy ==
His 1976 film New Improved Institutional Quality: In the Environment of Liquids and Nasals a Parasitic Vowel Sometimes Develops appeared on the 2008 DVD set entitled Treasures IV: American Avant-Garde Film, 1947-1986.

The book Two Films By Owen Land (Lux, London) has the complete scripts of Landow/Land's films Wide Angle Saxon and On the Marriage Broker Joke as Cited by Sigmund Freud in Wit and its Relation to the Unconscious or Can the Avant-Garde Artist Be Wholed?, as well as footnotes written by Land interpreting the many references and elements of these two films and a filmography by Mark Webber. Released in May 2011, the book Dialogues - a film by Owen Land (Paraguay Press, Paris) has the complete script of his last film, as well as two interviews with the artist and essays written by Philippe Pirotte, Julia Strebelow and Chris Sharp.
