= Paul Sharits =

American filmmaker (1943–1993)

- Born: February 7, 1943; Denver, Colorado
- Died: July 8, 1993 (aged 50); Buffalo, New York
- Education: University of Denver (BFA) Indiana University Bloomington (MFA)
- Movement: structural film

Paul Jeffrey Sharits (February 7, 1943, Denver, Colorado—July 8, 1993, Buffalo, New York) was a visual artist, best known for his work in experimental, or avant-garde filmmaking, particularly what became known as the structural film movement, along with other artists such as Tony Conrad, Hollis Frampton, and Michael Snow.

Paul Sharits' film work primarily focused on installations incorporating endless film loops, multiple projectors, and experimental soundtracks (prominently used in his 1975 film Shutter Interface).

== Life and career ==
Sharits was born in Denver, Colorado, and earned a Bachelor of Fine Arts in painting at the University of Denver's School of Art where he was a protégé of Stan Brakhage. He also attended Indiana University Bloomington, where he received an Master of Fine Arts in Visual Design. In July 1960, he married Frances Trujillo Niekerk. The couple had a son named Christopher in 1965, and in the same year Sharits' mother committed suicide. Both events would significantly change the trajectory of Sharits' art; he burned all of his early narrative work, missing only one film Wintercourse (1962). Sharits and Niekerk divorced in 1970.

He was subsequently a teacher at the Maryland Institute College of Art, Antioch College, and State University of New York at Buffalo (where he was hired by Gerald O'Grady along with Tony Conrad and Hollis Frampton). Sharits came to Buffalo in 1973 to teach at the Center for Media Study at the State University of New York at Buffalo, joining a group of experimental filmmakers that included Hollis Frampton, James Blue, and Tony Conrad. Son Christopher Sharits suggests on the memorial website that Sharits suffered from bipolar disorder.

From 1973 until 1992, Sharits taught film history and analysis in the Department of Media Study at the University at Buffalo. UB Reporter later identified him as an early member of the Media Study faculty who made important contributions to film and media studies in the United States. His teaching at Buffalo connected his structural film practice to the university's developing Media Study program.

=== Works ===
Drawing from his fine arts background in painting and graphic design, Sharits' creative process started by storyboarding his films with colored ink and graph paper. He would then compose his films frame-by-frame.

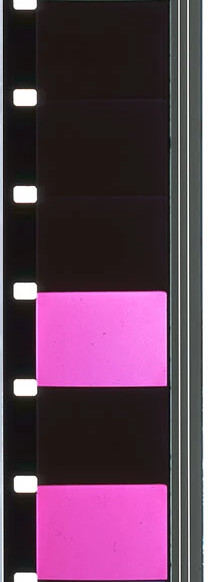
Film strip for N:O:T:H:I:N:G, one of Sharits's flicker films

Sharits' works of the 1960s, when he received the widest acclaim, included influential "flicker" films such as Ray Gun Virus, Piece Mandala/End War, N:O:T:H:I:N:G, T,O,U,C,H,I,N,G (featuring poet David Franks), and S:TREAM:S:S:ECTION:S:ECTION:S:S:ECTIONED. His works of the 70s were among the forerunners of contemporary installation art. Themes of violence permeate his work. His work has been preserved by Anthology Film Archives and is distributed by The Film-Makers' Cooperative and Canyon Cinema.

Sharits's films were later included in MindFrames: Media Study at Buffalo 1973–1990, shown at ZKM in Karlsruhe in 2006, which examined the University at Buffalo's Media Study program and its artists. ZKM's publication presented his films alongside works by James Blue, Tony Conrad, Hollis Frampton, Gerald O'Grady, Steina and Woody Vasulka, and Peter Weibel. The exhibition placed his films within a broader account of experimental film, video, and media practice at Buffalo.

== Death ==
In the late 1980s, Sharits was shot in his stomach at a local bar. He claimed the incident to have been an accident, for he was mistaken for someone else. He later experienced bouts of depression trying to recuperate from his wound, as well as having broken up with a designer named Laurie. Sharits later died silently in 1993, in Buffalo, New York, noted to be the same death place as his film colleagues, James Blue and Hollis Frampton, in a eulogy by former director of George Eastman House, Anthony Bannon.

== Filmography ==
- Wintercourse (1962)
- Ray Gun Virus (1966)
- Unrolling Event (Fluxfilm) (1966)
- Wristtrick (Fluxfilm) (1966)
- Dots 1 & 2 (Fluxfilm) (1966)
- Sears Catalogue (Fluxfilm) (1966)
- Word Movie (Fluxfilm 29) (1966)
- Piece Mandala/End War (1966)
- Razor Blades (1965–68)
- N:O:T:H:I:N:G (1968)
- T,O,U,C,H,I,N,G (1968)
- S:TREAM:S:S:ECTION:S:ECTION:S:S:ECTIONED (1968–71)
- Inferential Current (1971)
- Sound Strip/Film Strip (1971)
- Axiomatic Granularity (1972–73)
- Damaged Film Loop/The Forgetting of Impressions and Intentions (1973–74)
- Synchronousoundtracks (1973–74)
- Color Sound Frames (1974)
- Vertical Contiguity (1974)
- Analytical Studies III: Color Frame Passages (1973–74)
- Apparent Motion (1975)
- Shutter Interface (1975)
- Analytical Studies I: The Film Frame (1971–76)
- Analytical Studies II: Un-Frame-Lines (1971–76)
- Analytical Studies IV: Blank Color Frames (1975–76)
- Dream Displacement (1976)
- Epileptic Seizure Comparison (1976)
- Tails (1976)
- Declarative Mode (1976–77)
- Episodic Generation (1978)
- 3rd Degree (1982)
- Bad Burns (1982)
- Brancusi's Sculpture Ensemble at Tirgu Jiu (1977–84)
- Figment I: Fluxglam Voyage in Search of the Real Maciunas (1977–86)
- Rapture (1987)

=== Incomplete/uncatalogued works ===
- Five Mexican Pyramids (c. 1981)
- Poison (c. 1981)
