= Touching (musician) =

- Birth name: Michael Petkau Falk
- Born: 1979; Winnipeg, Canada
- Occupation(s): Singer-songwriter, producer
- Formerly of: Les Jupes
- Website: wearetouching.com

Michael Petkau Falk, better known as Touching (born 1979), is a singer-songwriter and producer.

== Biography ==
Born in Winnipeg in 1979, Falk attended Canadian Mennonite University. Until 2011, he served as an artistic director for the West End Cultural Centre. Falk was part of the record band, Les Jupes, until 2015 and released an album, Some Kind of Family.

In 2015, was nominated for the Western Canadian Music Award.

In 2016, worked as an artistic director for the Winnipeg International Jazz Festival.

In 2020, started to use the pseudonym, Touching.

In 2021, released albums, Isolation Blues and Littleworlds.

== Discography ==
=== Albums ===
- Some Kind of Family
- Isolation Blues
- Littleworlds
- I Can Be Two People at Once

=== Singles ===
- "Oh General"
- "The Darkness"
- "Let Me Be Lonely With You"
- "All My Worries"
- "Born Lucky"
- "Listen"
- "My Generation Knows"
- "Tony Called the Muscle"
- "Caught in the Middle"
- "Say Something"

== Awards and recognition ==
- 2015: Western Canadian Music Award
