= Deseret (film) =

1995 experimental documentary film

- Directed by: James Benning
- Written by: James Benning
- Produced by: James Benning
- Narrated by: Fred Gardner
- Cinematography: James Benning
- Release date: 1995
- Running time: 82 minutes
- Country: United States
- Language: English

Deseret is a 1995 experimental documentary film written and directed by James Benning and narrated by Fred Gardner. It chronicles the history of Utah from 1852 to 1992 by having the narrator read 93 news stories from The New York Times in chronological order over static shots of Utah. The title refers to the original proposed name for the state of Utah, the Jaredite word for "honeybee" in the Book of Mormon.

== Overview ==
The film alternates between showing a series of consecutive shots with voice-over—one shot for each sentence of the news story—and a single shot without voice-over. The first narrated shot of each news story has the date the article was published superimposed. The shots without narration separate one news story from the next, and these unnarrated shots get shorter and shorter as the film progresses, representing shorter delays between the events happening and being reported in the news. In addition, the evolution of journalistic language over the time period means that the length of the sentences also decreases, which results in an accelerating pace. The cinematography is in black and white for the part of the film which corresponds to the 1800s and then switches to color for the 1900s. Only a handful of shots contain human beings. One of the shots accompanying each story shows where it occurred, either literally or figuratively.

Out of the 93 news stories, more than half are from the first two decades or the last two, with 31 from the 1850s and 1860s and 26 from the 1980s and 1990s; this was a decision made by Benning to invite comparison between the eras. The first 24 news stories are about the establishment of Mormonism in Utah. Stories about the Native Americans in Utah are a recurring subject in the pre-1900 part of the film, and stories about radiation—both naturally-occurring and fallout—are a recurring theme in the post-1900 portion. In the second half of the film, the news stories increasingly focus on environmental issues including toxic waste management, the chemical and biological weapons facility Dugway Proving Ground near Salt Lake City, and the indirect consequences of nuclear weapons testing in neighboring Nevada.

== Production ==
In preparation for the film, Benning spent six months reading every New York Times article about Utah he could find from the founding of the newspaper in 1852 to 1992. After choosing which ones to use in the film, he spent another three months condensing the news stories to a length of eight to ten sentences each, while retaining the original language. Benning chose Fred Gardner as narrator because he could read the text in a monotone voice, making the words rather than the voice convey the drama. Recording the narration took a few months, after which filming commenced. The imagery was recorded on 16 mm camera; Benning carried one camera for shooting black-and-white and one for shooting in color. Shooting on location in Utah lasted for approximately 120 days spread out over a period of 14 months. Editing the film took an additional nine months; the final film contains more than 600 shots.

== Release and reception ==
The film was shown at the 1996 Sundance Film Festival, receiving critical acclaim.
