= Peter Kubelka =

Austrian artist (born 1934)

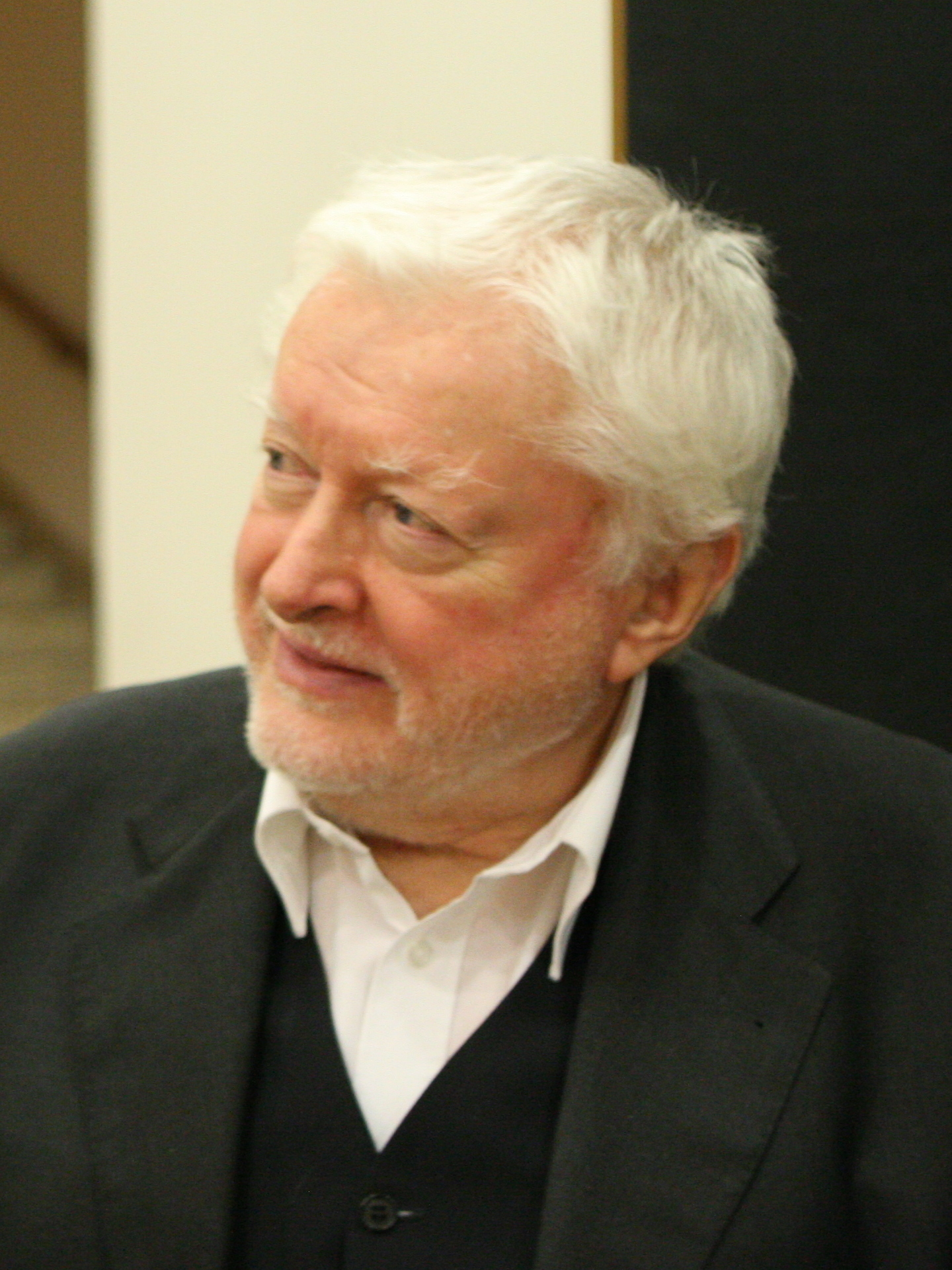
- Kubelka in 2014
- Born: 23 March 1934 (age 91); Vienna, Austria
- Education: University of Music and Performing Arts, Vienna, Centro Sperimentale di Cinematografia
- Known for: Experimental film
- Notable work: Adebar (1957), Arnulf Rainer (1960)
- Awards: Austrian Decoration for Science and Art (2005); Split Film Festival Award for the Outstanding Contribution to the Artistic Development of the Moving Image (2013)

Peter Kubelka (born 23 March 1934) is an Austrian filmmaker, architect, musician, curator and lecturer. His films, few in number, are known to be carefully edited and extremely brief. He is known for his 1966 Unsere Afrikareise (Our Trip to Africa), and for other very short and intricately edited films.

Arnulf Rainer, a short film which alternates black and clear film, and white noise and silence, is considered a seminal work inscribing the edges of film theory. Conflated with a later effort by Tony Conrad called, "The Flicker", a notion developed that "flicker films" were a subcategory of experimental or avant garde. There wasn't, and Kubelka was creating a "pure" film with only the elements of dark and light. While not ignoring Kubelka's efforts, Conrad created a similar piece with a very different concept, focused more on rhythm and perceptual distortion. Kubelka preferred the concrete. Kubelka also created two pieces Adebar (1957) and Schwechater (1958) that were commissioned by businesses (a dance club and a beer brand). While being rejected as ads, his editing and choice of images and sound is seen as almost Platonic ideals of the transposition of dynamic work to the screen in the commercial form.

Kubelka designed the Anthology Film Archives film screening space in the 1970s in New York in its first iteration in the Public Theater building in New York City. The theater had individual seats blocked with visual barriers so that each audience member was totally isolated from other patrons. The theater was painted black and the seating was covered in black velvet. The only light in the room between film showings came from a spotlight aimed at the screen; the only light in the room came from the screen.

Peter Kubelka is the brother of the writer Susanna Kubelka. While his body of art work is limited, his influence on the European and American "avant garde" was significant, and continues to be so. That he named his minimalist masterpiece after his friend, Arnulf Reiner, is only evidence of his subtle influence.

In 2005, he received the Austrian Decoration for Science and Art.

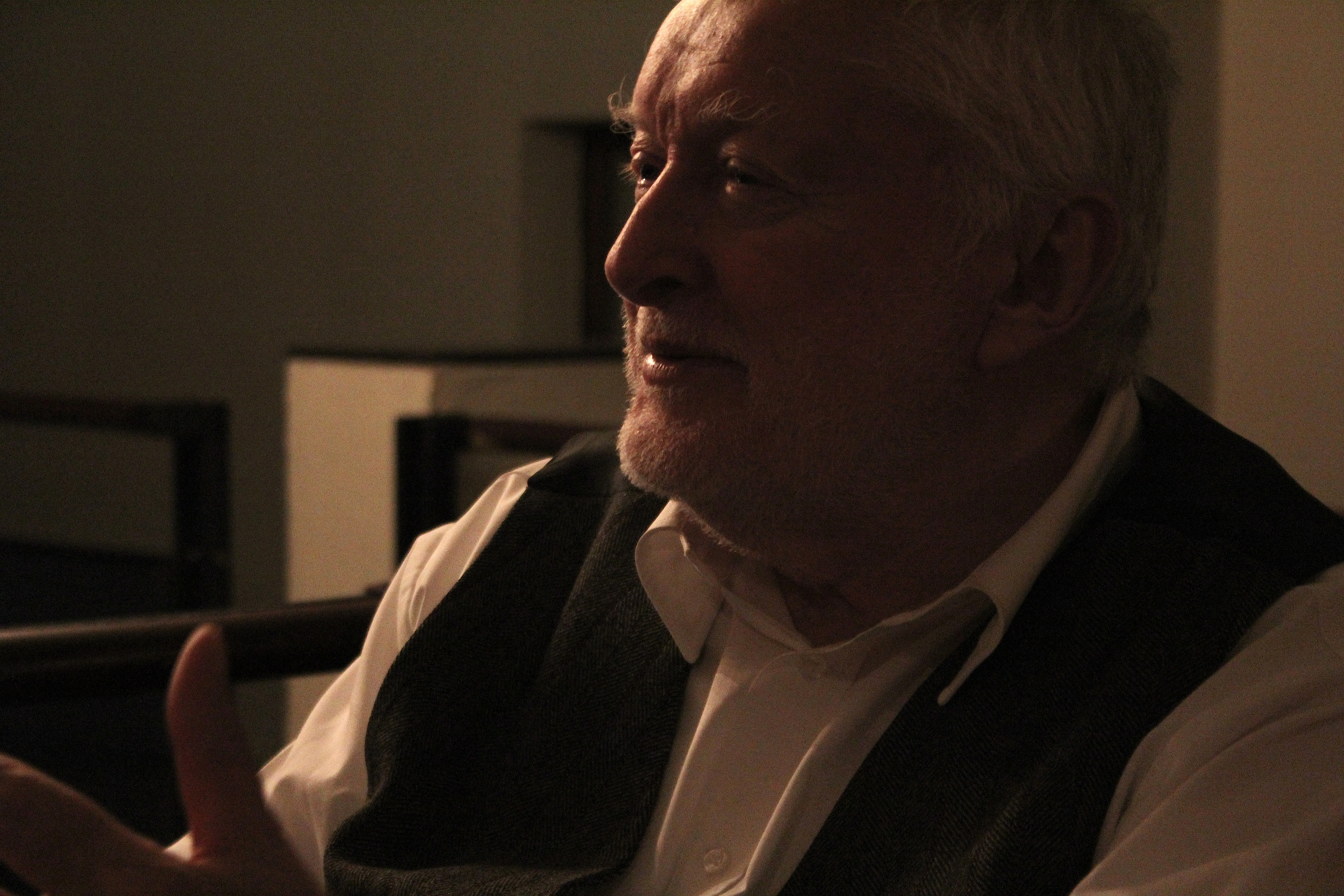
Peter Kubelka giving a master class in 2012

== Selected filmography ==
- Mosaik Im Vertrauen (Mosaic in Confidence) (1955)
- Adebar (1957)
- Schwechater (1958)
- Arnulf Rainer (1960)
- Unsere Afrikareise (Our Trip to Africa) (1965)
- Pause! (1977)
- Dichtung und Wahrheit (Poetry and Truth) (2003)
- Antiphon (2012)
