= 1906 in film =

The year 1906 in film involved some significant events.

== Events ==
- December 14 – Pathé Frères pioneer the luxury cinema with the opening of the Omnia Cinéma-Pathé in Paris.
- December 26 – The world's first feature film, The Story of the Kelly Gang, is released.
- Carl Laemmle opens one of the first movie theaters in Chicago.

== Notable films ==
=== A ===
- Aladdin and His Wonder Lamp (Aladin ou la lampe merveilleuse), directed by Albert Capellani, based on the Middle-Eastern folk tale – (France)
- The Automobile Thieves, directed by J. Stuart Blackton – (US)

=== D ===
- Dream of a Rarebit Fiend, directed by Edwin S. Porter – (US)

=== G ===
- The Gans-Nelson Contest, starring Joe Gans and Battling Nelson – (US)

=== H ===
- The Hilarious Posters (Les Affiches en goguette), directed by Georges Méliès – (France)
- The House of Ghosts (La Maison ensorcelée), directed by Segundo de Chomón – (France)
- Humorous Phases of Funny Faces, directed by J. Stuart Blackton – (US)

=== L ===
- Life of a Cowboy, directed by Edwin S. Porter – (US)
- A Lively Quarter-Day, directed by J. H. Martin – (UK)

=== M ===
- The Magic Roses (Les Roses magique), directed by Segundo de Chomón – (France)
- Mephisto's Son (Le Fils du Diable), directed by Charles-Lucien Lépine – (France)
- The Merry Frolics of Satan (Les Quat'Cents Farces du Diable), directed by Georges Méliès – (France)
- The Mysterious Retort (L'Alchimiste Parafaragaramus ou la Cornue infernale), directed by Georges Méliès – (France)

=== Q ===
- The '?' Motorist, directed by Walter R. Booth – (UK)

=== R ===
- The Rajah's Casket (L'есrin du rajah), directed by Gaston Velle – (France)

=== S ===
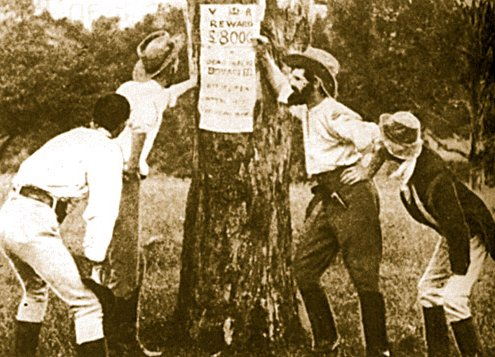
Image of the 1906 film, The Story of the Kelly Gang.

- San Francisco: Aftermath of Earthquake, directed by Robert K. Bonine – (US)
- The Scheming Gambler's Paradise (Le Tripot clandestin), directed by Georges Méliès – (France)
- A Spiritualistic Meeting (Le Fantôme d'Alger) (lost), directed by Georges Méliès – (France)
- The Story of the Kelly Gang (incomplete), directed by Charles Tait – (Australia)

=== T ===
- Three American Beauties, directed by Edwin S. Porter and Wallace McCutcheon Sr. – (US)
- A Trip Down Market Street, directed by the Miles Brothers – (US)

=== V ===
- A Visit to Peek Frean and Co.'s Biscuit Works – (UK)

=== W ===
- Whitsuntide Fair at Preston, produced by Mitchell and Kenyon – (UK)
- A Winter Straw Ride, directed by Edwin S. Porter – (US)
- The Witch (La Fée Carabosse ou le Poignard fatal), directed by Georges Méliès – (France)

== Births ==
Month	Date	Name	Country	Profession	Died
January	1	Manuel Silos	Philippines	Actor, director	1988
January	14	William Bendix	US	Actor	1964
February	5	John Carradine	US	Actor	1988
February	7	Colette Darfeuil	France	Actress	1998
February	10	Lon Chaney Jr.	US	Actor	1973
February	12	Charles Quigley	US	Actor	1964
February	17	Mary Brian	US	Actress	2002
February	21	Jeanne Aubert	France	Actress, singer	1988
February	25	Warren Hymer	US	Actor	1948
February	26	Madeleine Carroll	UK	Actress	1987
March	1	Camilla Spira	Germany	Actress	1997
March	6	Lou Costello	US	Comedian, actor	1959
March	19	Roy Roberts	US	Actor	1975
April	1	Ned Glass	Poland	Actor	1984
April	5	Grady Sutton	US	Actor	1995
April	22	Eddie Albert	US	Actor	2005
April	26	Renate Müller	Germany	Actress	1937
May	1	Josephine Dunn	US	Actress	1983
May	1	Rose Hobart	US	Actress, SAG Official	2000
May	3	Mary Astor	US	Actress	1987
May	8	Roberto Rossellini	Italy	Director, producer, screenwriter	1977
May	19	Bruce Bennett	US	Actor	2007
May	21	Lola Lane	US	Actress, singer	1981
May	30	Lyda Roberti	US	Actress, singer	1938
June	4	Vinton Hayworth	US	Actor, Playwright, Screenwriter	1970
June	17	Evalyn Knapp	US	Actress	1981
June	22	Billy Wilder	Austria-Hungary	Director, producer, screenwriter	2002
June	26	Alberto Rabagliati	Italy	Singer, actor	1974
July	3	George Sanders	UK	Actor	1972
July	17	John Carroll	US	Actor	1979
July	29	Thelma Todd	US	Actress, Businesswoman	1935
August	5	Joan Hickson	UK	Actress	1998
August	5	John Huston	US	Actor, director, screenwriter, Visual Artist	1987
August	9	Dorothy Jordan	US	Actress	1988
August	29	Lurene Tuttle	US	Actress, Acting Coach	1986
August	30	Joan Blondell	US	Actress	1979
September	4	Dita Parlo	Germany	Actress	1971
September	15	Jacques Becker	France	Director, screenwriter	1960
October	6	Janet Gaynor	US	Actress	1984
November	2	Luchino Visconti	Italy	Director, screenwriter	1976
November	14	Louise Brooks	US	Actress, dancer	1985
December	2	Donald Woods	Canada	Actor	1998
December	6	Onest Conley	US	Actor	1989
December	23	Kane Richmond	US	Actor	1973
December	25	Lew Grade	UK	Dancer, producer	1998
December	26	Imperio Argentina	Argentina	Singer, actress	2003
December	27	Oscar Levant	US	Composer, Comedian, Actor	1972
December	30	Carol Reed	UK	Director, producer	1976

== Deaths ==
- May 23 – Henrik Ibsen, author (born 1828)
- July 18 – Gaynor Rowlands, (lantern actress) (born 1883)

== Debuts ==
- Florence Lawrence – The Automobile Thieves (short)
- Gabrielle Robinne – The Troubadour (short)
