= List of American films of 1906 =

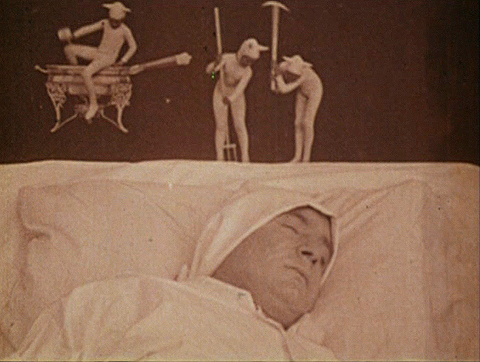
Dream of a Rarebit Fiend

A list of American films released in 1906.

Title	Director	Cast	Genre	Notes
The Automobile Thieves	J. Stuart Blackton	J. Stuart Blackton, Florence Lawrence	Short crime drama	Released 10 November 1906
Dream of a Rarebit Fiend	Wallace McCutcheon and Edwin S. Porter		Short	
From Leadville to Aspen: A Hold-Up in the Rockies	Francis J. Marion and Wallace McCutcheon		Short action/crime western	
Humorous Phases of Funny Faces	J. Stuart Blackton	J. Stuart Blackton	Short animated cartoon	
Kathleen Mavourneen	Edwin S. Porter		Short film	
The Female Highwayman	Bronco Billy Anderson	Margaret Leslie and Howard E. Nicholas	Short crime drama	Released 24 November 1906
A Trip Down Market Street	Miles Brothers		Short film	
Waiting at the Church	Edwin S. Porter		Short film	

== See also ==
- AFI Catalog of Feature Films
- 1905 in the United States
