= Fairmont San Francisco =

Luxury hotel in California, US

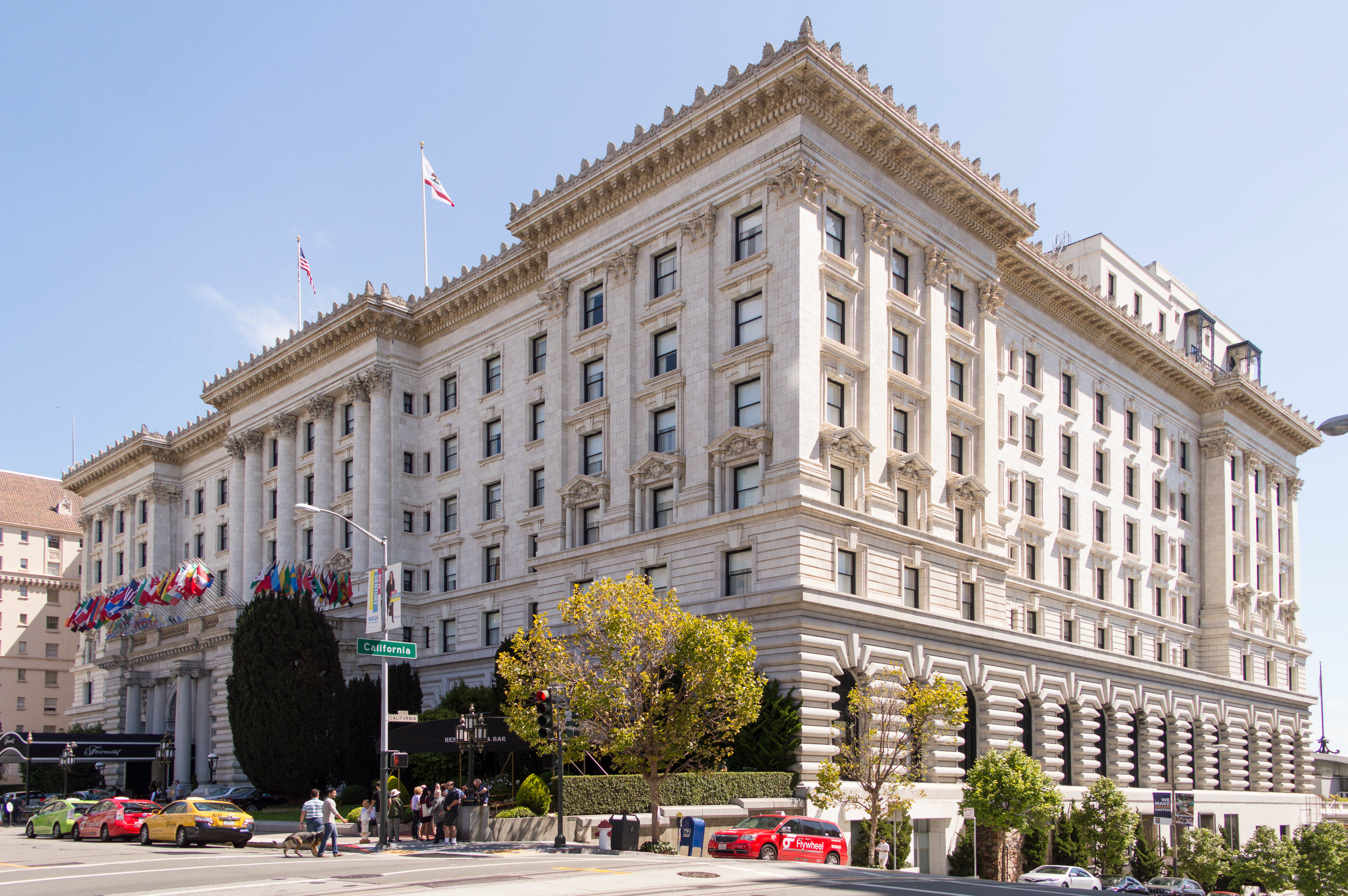

- Location within San Francisco County Location within California Location within the United States
- Hotel chain: Fairmont Hotels and Resorts

General information
- Location: United States, 950 Mason Street; San Francisco, California
- Coordinates: 37.7924°N 122.4102°W
- Opening: Main: 18 April 1907; 119 years ago Tower: 1962
- Owner: Mirae Asset Global Investments
- Operator: Fairmont Hotels & Resorts

Height
- Height: Tower: 99.06 m (325.0 ft)

Technical details
- Floor count: Main: 9 Tower: 29

Design and construction
- Architects: James W. and Merritt J. Reid; Ira Wilson Hoover; Julia Morgan

Other information
- Number of rooms: 591
- Number of suites: >11
- Number of restaurants: Laurel Court Restaurant and Bar; Tonga Room & Hurricane Bar

Website
- www.fairmont.com/sanfrancisco
- Fairmont Hotel
- U.S. National Register of Historic Places
- San Francisco Designated Landmark
- Architectural style: Beaux-Arts
- NRHP reference No.: 02000373
- SFDL No.: 185

Significant dates
- Added to NRHP: April 17, 2002
- Designated SFDL: 1987

The Fairmont San Francisco is a luxury hotel at 950 Mason Street, atop Nob Hill in San Francisco, California. The hotel was named after mining magnate and U.S. senator James G. Fair (1831–94), by his daughters, Theresa Fair Oelrichs and Virginia Fair Vanderbilt, who built the hotel in his honor. The hotel was the vanguard of the Fairmont Hotels and Resorts chain. The group is now owned by Fairmont Raffles Hotels International, but all the original Fairmont hotels still keep their names.

It has been featured in many films, including The Rock. Exterior and interior shots of the hotel were used as stand-ins for the fictional St. Gregory Hotel in the television series Hotel.

It is also notable for its $21,000-per-night 6,000-square-foot 1927 entire-eighth-floor penthouse presidential suite, used by U.S. presidents (Truman, Kennedy, Obama, and Biden), Alfred Hitchcock, Charles, Prince of Wales, Tony Bennett, Mick Jagger and Marilyn Monroe when visiting the Bay Area.

The Fairmont San Francisco was added to the National Register of Historic Places on April 17, 2002. It is a member of Historic Hotels of America, the official program of the National Trust for Historic Preservation.

== 1906 earthquake ==
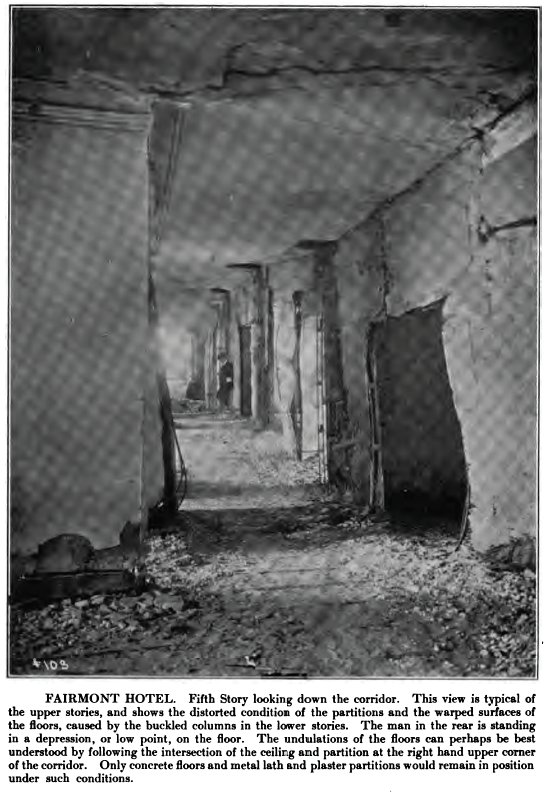
Damage to the fifth floor from the 1906 earthquake

The hotel was nearly completed before the 1906 San Francisco earthquake. Although the structure survived, the interior was heavily damaged by fire, and opening was delayed until 1907. Architect and engineer Julia Morgan was hired to repair the building because of her then innovative use of reinforced concrete, which could produce buildings capable of withstanding earthquakes and other disasters.

== Venues ==
Current and former venues have included the Venetian Room, New Orleans Room, Fairmont Playhouse (1933-1936), Tonga Room, Nob Hill Theatre (1944-1964), Cirque Room (1935-), Papagayo Room (1945-1961), and KSFO studios (1955-1983).

== Tonga Room ==
Among the hotel's attractions is the Tonga Room & Hurricane Bar, a historic tiki bar, which opened in 1945 and was remodeled in 1952, and 1967. Elements of the bar were also "updated" in 2009. It features a bandstand on a barge that floats in a former swimming pool, a dining area built from parts of an old sailing ship, and artificial thunderstorms. In January 2009, the owners announced plans to close the Tonga Room in connection with a renovation and condo conversion of the hotel. In response, a group planned to file an application to make the Tonga Room an official San Francisco landmark. The plans were delayed and Tonga Room is still open today (despite many rumors of its temporary closure).

== United Nations ==
In 1945, the Fairmont hosted international statesmen for meetings which culminated in the creation of the United Nations. Finessing of the United Nations Charter was conducted in the hotel's Garden Room and a plaque at the hotel memorializes the event.

== First concierge in the United States ==
The Fairmont was the first American hotel to offer concierge services. Tom Wolfe, who had trained in Europe, served as the Fairmont's first concierge from 1974 to 1981. He returned to the Fairmont in 1995.

== Ownership change ==
On May 9, 2012, funds managed by Oaktree Capital Management, L.P. and Woodridge Capital Partners LLC, a Los Angeles–based real estate developer and investor, bought the property for $200 million. They also acquired the Mark Hopkins Hotel across the street in 2014.

The hotel was sold again on November 30, 2015, to the South Korean Mirae Asset Global Investments group for $450 million.

== Popular culture ==
The Venetian Room at the Fairmont Hotel was where Tony Bennett first sang "I Left My Heart in San Francisco" in December 1961. A statue of Tony Bennett was unveiled outside the Fairmont on 19 August 2016, in honor of his 90th birthday, the performance and the song's history with San Francisco.

The Fairmont Hotel was used in the establishing shots for the fictional St. Gregory Hotel in the 1983 television series Hotel. The hotel on which the original novel was based is now The Roosevelt New Orleans.

The Fairmont is seen in the movies The Lineup (1958) and The Intern (2015).

Ernie Gehr's avant-garde film Side/Walk/Shuttle was filmed entirely from the Fairmont's elevator.

In the song "Real Good for Free" on the album Miles of Aisles, Joni Mitchell changes the line "I slept last night in a good hotel" to "I slept last night in the Fairmont Hotel".

The Fairmont makes a brief appearance in the film Shang-Chi and the Legend of the Ten Rings, where characters Shang-Chi and his best friend Katy previously worked as valet parkers at the beginning of the film.

Views of the Fairmont lobby

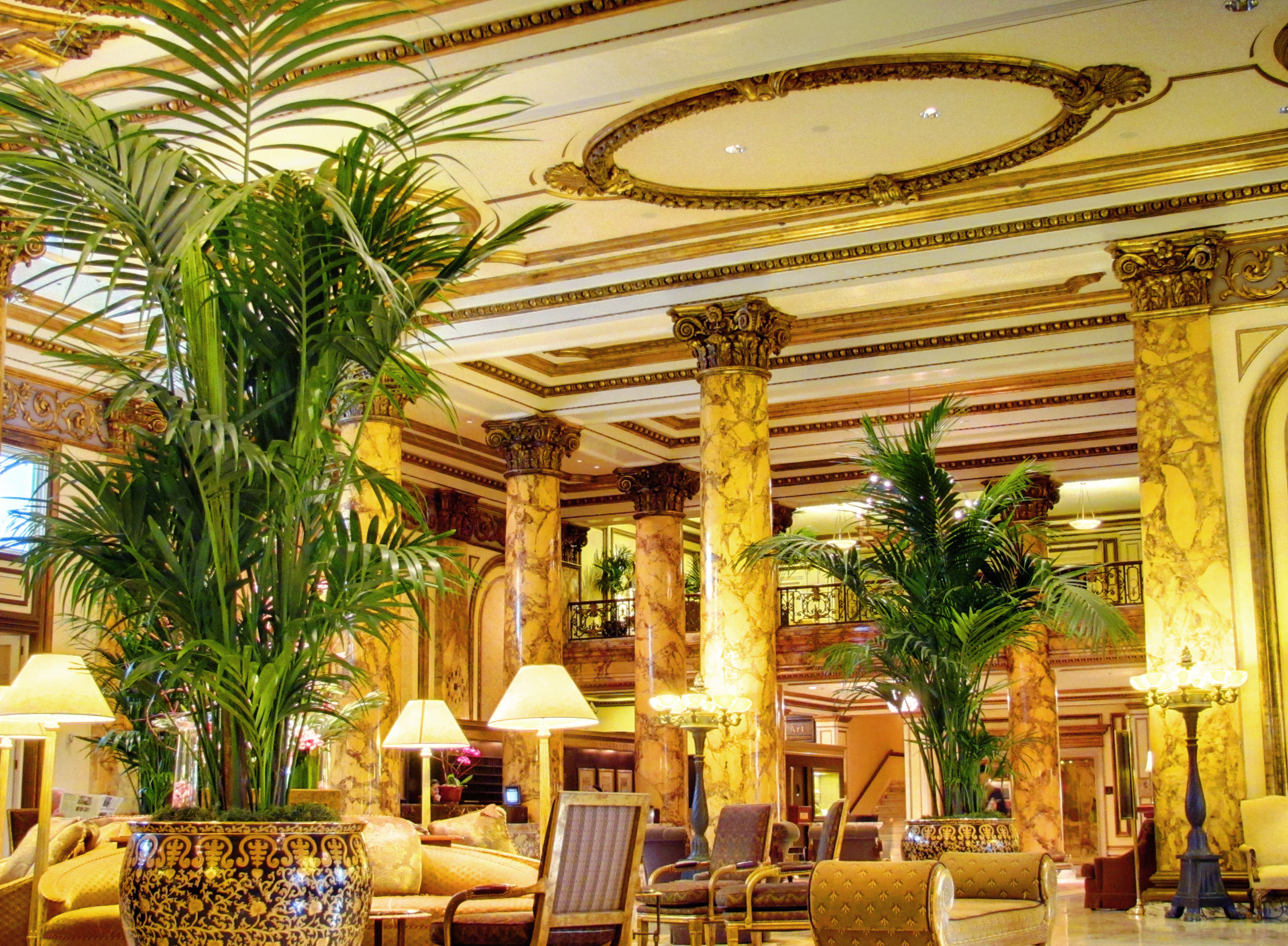

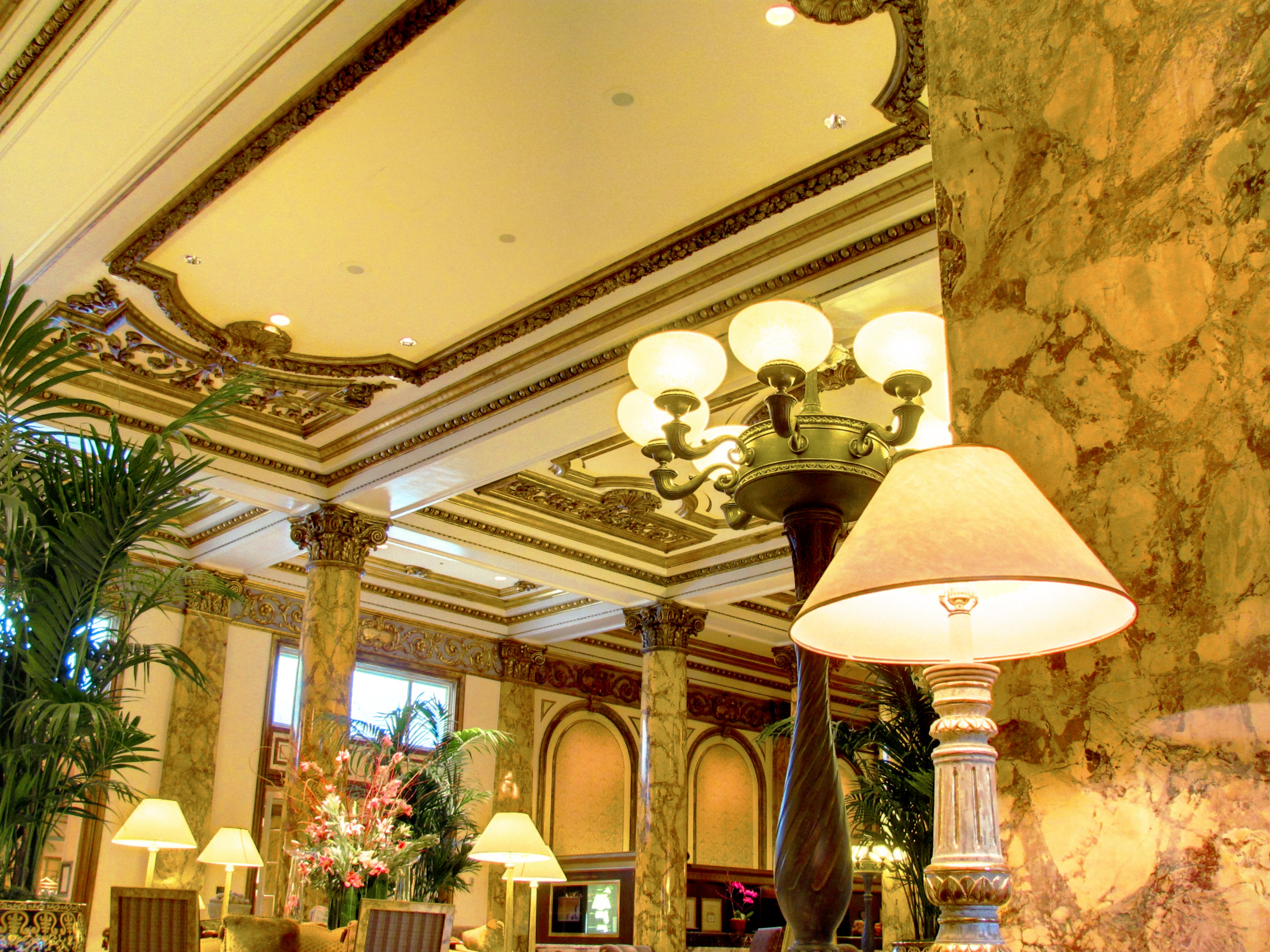

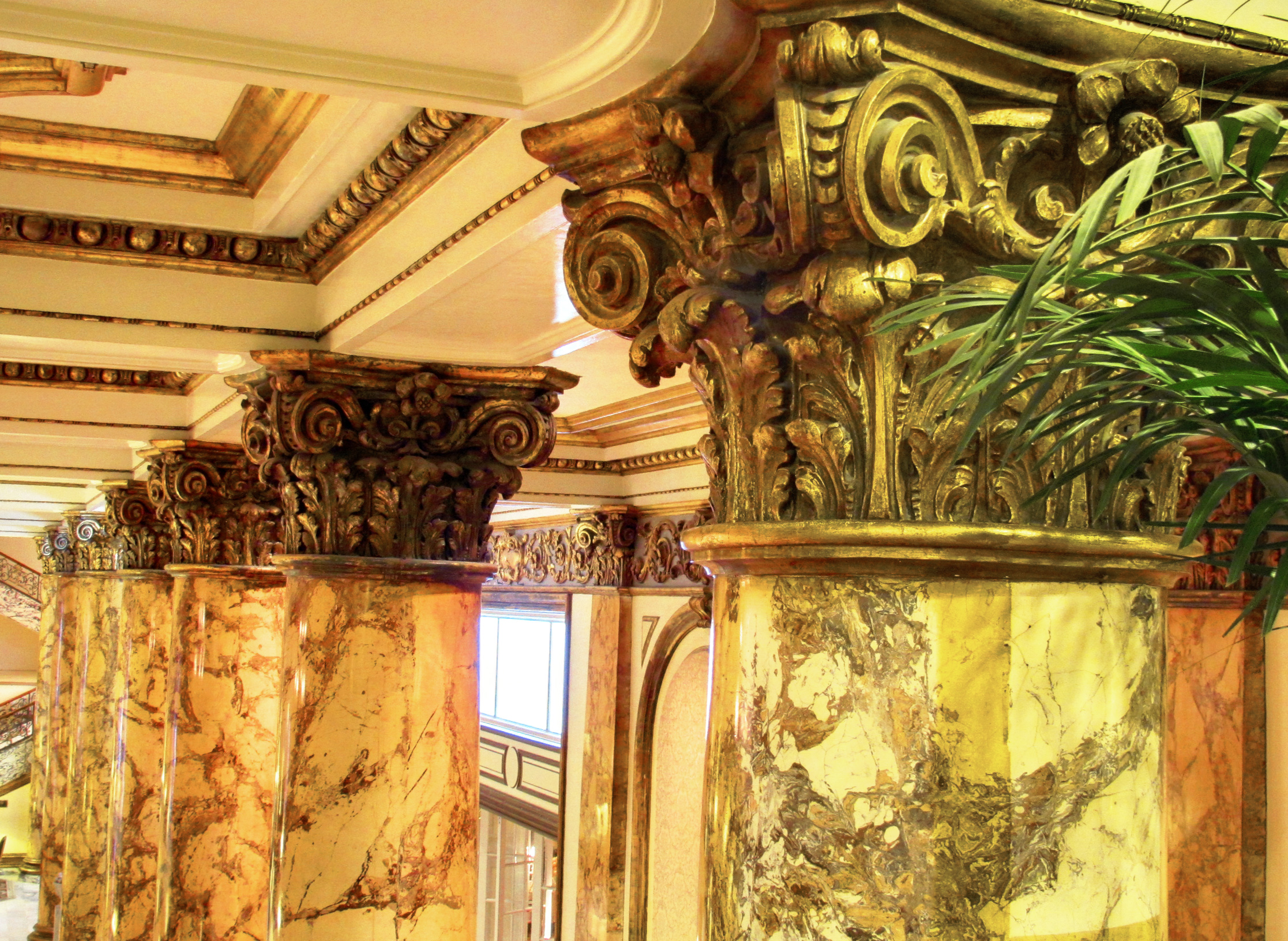

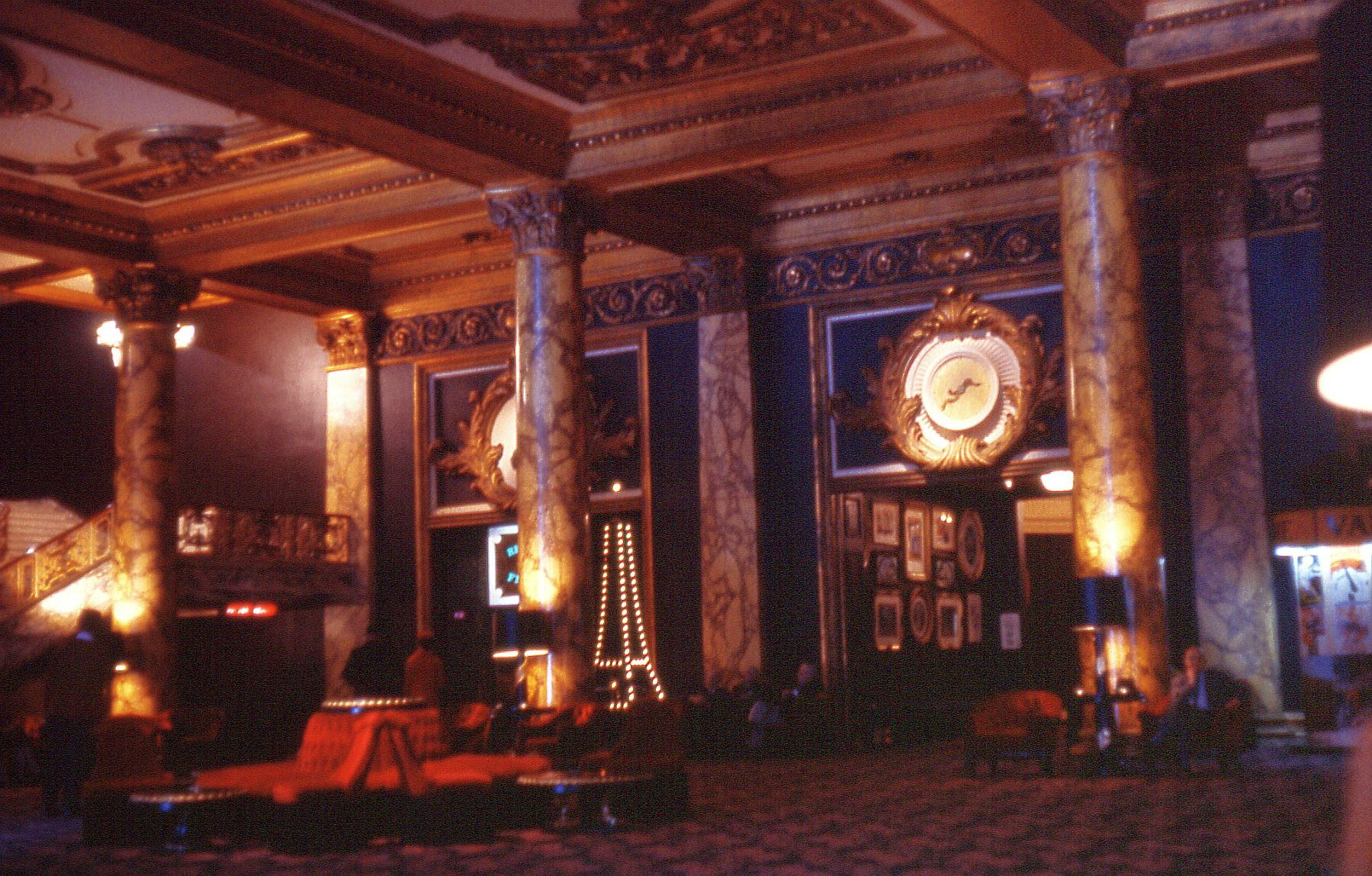
August, 1964

== See also ==
- List of San Francisco Designated Landmarks
