= Eureka (1979 film) =

American experimental film by Ernie Gehr

- The full film
- Directed by: Ernie Gehr
- Based on: A Trip Down Market Street by the Miles Brothers
- Distributed by: The Film-Makers' Cooperative
- Release date: January 13, 1979
- Running time: 30 minutes
- Country: United States
- Language: Silent

Eureka, also known as Geography, is a 1979 American experimental short film by Ernie Gehr. It uses as its source material A Trip Down Market Street, a 1906 phantom ride which traverses Market Street in San Francisco. Gehr rephotographed the film, slowing it considerably by capturing each frame multiple times.

== Production ==
A Trip Down Market Street (1906) is the source material for Eureka.

In August 1974, Gehr participated in the film program New Forms in Films, curated by Annette Michelson. She showed him a 16 mm print of A Trip Down Market Street given to her by Ruth Perlmutter, who had been a student of hers at New York University. Perlmutter had obtained the print from a salesman from the San Francisco Bay Area, who in turn had found it in a trunk of his father's belongings. Gehr was interested in the film because it reminded him of his first experiences in San Francisco. He called Perlmutter to get his own print of the film, and after watching it repeatedly over several months, he decided to make something from it.

To make Eureka, Gehr projected A Trip Down Market Street with a Kodak Analyst projector, which allowed him to project individual frames. He used a Bolex 16 mm camera to record each image four to eight times. Gehr adjusted this ratio throughout the film and sought a speed that would register as being "on a borderline between stillness and motion". The contrast in the image was then increased when Eureka was processed at the film laboratory. The film's title refers to a logo for Eureka, California that appears on a wagon toward the end of the film. Gehr used Fever as a working title for the film but changed it because of the similarity to Paul Morrissey's 1972 film Heat.

== Release and reception ==
Eureka premiered at the Collective for Living Cinema on January 13, 1979. John Pruitt wrote that the film draws "emotional power from poignantly reminding us that in any representational film, the viewer sits before a screen on which a world is projected which he would like to enter, or at least sense in an unmediated manner." J. Hoberman described the effect as "a dizzying and majestic play between the exaggerated flatness of the image and the rigorous perspective it represents." He ranked it as the second best film of the year.

Amy Taubin remarked that "Gehr's very simple choice has increased the complexity of the original, without losing the sense of the film recording a moment in history." Scott MacDonald described the film as a chronicle not only of the history of San Francisco, but the history of a film print, noting the indexical relationship between the projection and preservation of the film and the visual evidence of wear and tear.

== Bibliography ==
- Habib, André (2020). "Finding Early Cinema in the Avant-Garde". In Bernardi, Joanne; Cherchi Usai, Paolo; Williams, Tami; Yumibe, Joshua (eds.). Provenance and Early Cinema. Indiana University Press. ISBN 978-0-253-05299-5.
- MacDonald, Scott (2006). A Critical Cinema 5: Interviews with Independent Filmmakers. University of California Press. ISBN 978-0-520-24594-5.
- Peterson, James (2012). "Is a Cognitive Approach to the Avant-garde Cinema Perverse?". In Bordwell, David; Carroll, Noël (eds.). Post-Theory: Reconstructing Film Studies. University of Wisconsin Press. ISBN 978-0-253-05299-5.
- Pipolo, Tony (2021). The Melancholy Lens: Loss and Mourning in American Avant-Garde Cinema. Oxford University Press. ISBN 978-0-19-755116-5.
- Sitney, P. Adams (2008). Eyes Upside Down: Visionary Filmmakers and the Heritage of Emerson. Oxford University Press. ISBN 978-0-19-533115-8.
