= Still (1971 film) =

- Directed by: Ernie Gehr
- Cinematography: Ernie Gehr
- Edited by: Ernie Gehr
- Distributed by: The Film-Makers' Cooperative
- Release date: 1971
- Running time: 54 minutes
- Country: United States

Still is a 1971 American experimental film by Ernie Gehr. It consists of several long takes of a city street, presented as double exposures taken from the same location at different times of day.

== Description ==
Still comprises eight sections depicting street scenes, each separated by black leader. The first four are silent 3-minute sequences, and the last four are 11-minute sequences with sound. All but the final sequence are double exposures. The scenes show the area around a single city street, capturing the movement of cars and pedestrians as well as three buildings across the street.

The relationship of the soundtrack to the image is often ambiguous. Sections of the film may use audio synchronized with the image or audio from a different moment entirely, and the possibility of sound from off-screen events makes distinguishing between the two cases difficult.

== Production ==
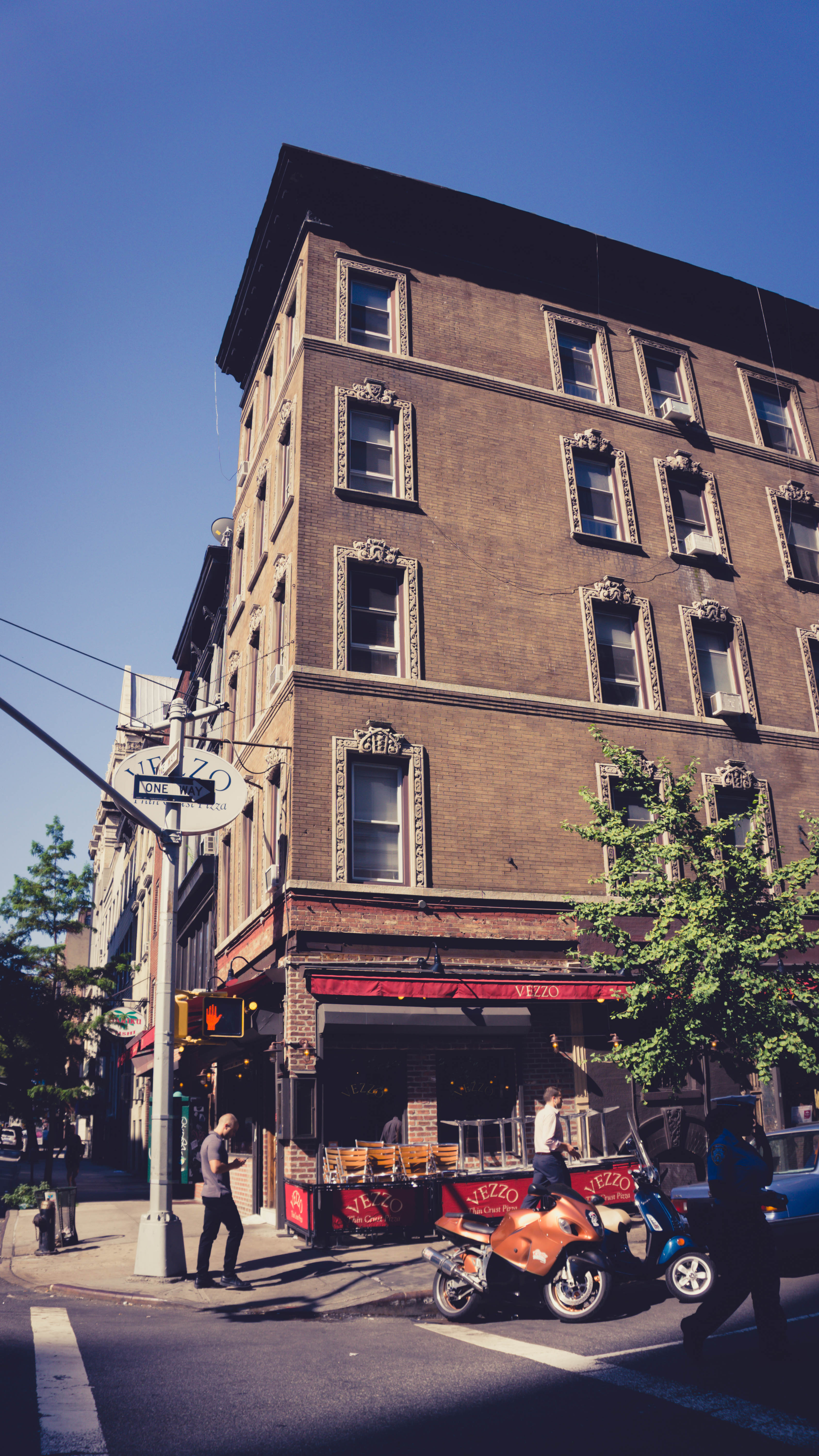
Gehr filmed along a block of Lexington Avenue (shown from the north in 2015).

Gehr worked at the Film-Makers' Cooperative, in a ground-floor office at 175 Lexington Avenue. His desk was near a window, through which he was able to observe the people and cars moving along the street. At one point, Gehr made small rectangles out of black paper, which he taped to the window and peered through as if they were frames. The first four sections were shot on entire 100-foot rolls of film, using a Bolex camera. Gehr's interest in long takes was in part a reaction against the rapid editing seen in more didactic films created to support or oppose the Vietnam War.

Gehr decided that he needed longer takes but lacked equipment for recording longer rolls or synchronous sound. He managed to borrow it from faculty at Binghamton University. Gehr's shooting schedule was limited by his ability to arrange for someone to transport equipment from Vestal into Manhattan. Because he could not leave equipment at the office overnight, each superimposition had to be completed the day it was started, usually by shooting the first take in the morning and waiting a few hours until the positions of shadows and parked cars were substantially different before shooting the second take. The sound was captured using a Nagra recorder. Gehr had difficulty operating the recorder, and Larry Gottheim assisted him for the last take.

== Reception ==
Still became one of Gehr's lesser known films. P. Adams Sitney praised Gehr's technique, writing that "he succeeds in creating a range of image density from the most evanescent to opaque." Richard Foreman described Still as "the first truly Proustian film in which I see mood and atmosphere seem to become slowly crystallized on particular objects" and praised Gehr for having "the good sense, courage and purity of spirit to allow [the depth of the world] to manifest itself within the cannily plotted matrix of his structure". Regina Cornwell called Still "a conscious and contemporary film magic" that unified the actuality films of the Lumière brothers and the trick films of Georges Méliès. J. Hoberman similarly compared it to Méliès and the Lumières and ranked it as the seventh best film of the 1970s. Gilberto Perez wrote that the technique "works wondrously to evoke the mysterious interplay of different times…in the life of a place. This is a film about place in time, and in time we sense that this is a place happily haunted by its ghosts." Still is part of Anthology Film Archives' Essential Cinema Repertory collection.

== Bibliography ==
- MacDonald, Scott (2006). A Critical Cinema 5: Interviews with Independent Filmmakers. University of California Press. ISBN 978-0-520-24594-5.
- Sitney, P. Adams (1979). Visionary Film: The American Avant-Garde 1943–1978. Oxford University Press. ISBN 0-19-502486-9.
