= Serene Velocity =

- Directed by: Ernie Gehr
- Release date: 1970
- Running time: 23 minutes
- Country: United States
- Language: Silent

Serene Velocity is a 1970 American experimental short film directed by Ernie Gehr. Gehr filmed it in the basement hallway of a Binghamton University academic building, using a static camera position and changing only the focal length of the camera. It is recognized as a key work of structural filmmaking and was selected for preservation in the U.S. National Film Registry in 2001.

== Description ==
Serene Velocity lasts twenty-three minutes and is silent. To make the film, Gehr locked his camera down in the center of a hallway, shooting several individual frames at a time. After each set of exposures, he changed the focal length on the lens, zooming in and then out in increasing increments. What begins as a small difference in apparent distance several frames at a time expands to extreme closeups and wide shots jumping back and forth. By the end of the film, the zoom into the end of the hallway reveals a set of double doors with daylight filtering through.

== Production ==
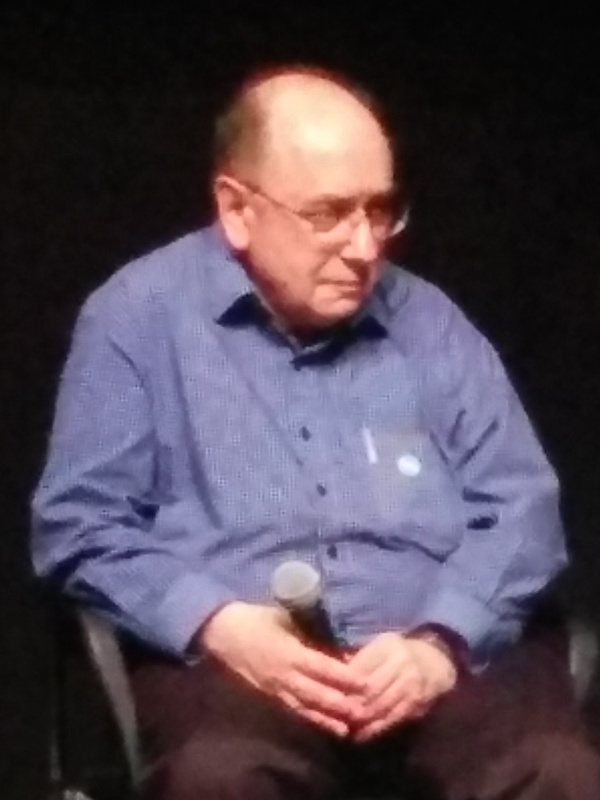
Director Ernie Gehr in 2017

In early 1970 Gehr was at SUNY Binghamton while Larry Gottheim was beginning to form a film department. Gottheim was impressed with Gehr's earlier short films Morning and Wait, and the two became acquainted when Gottheim replaced a damaged print of one of Gehr's works. With the encouragement of Gottheim and Ken Jacobs, Gehr taught two courses there during the summer session. He had been interested in making a film that explored "the intervals between frames–activating the screen plane from frame to frame more dynamically". One day during the session, Gehr was on his way to the film department's editing rooms in a basement and thought of the hallway as an ideal place to film. A long, plain area appealed to him as a good space to "maximize the tension between representation and abstraction".

Gehr began shooting test footage in the basement hallway. He tested mid-range and extreme focal lengths in "bars" of 1, 2, 4, 6, and 8 frames. He decided to use bars of 4 frames, projected at 16 frames per second. This would have been roughly equivalent to 6 frames at 24 frames per second, but Gehr chose a lower frame rate so that each frame would remain on screen longer, accentuating the optical effects. He was surprised by the physical effect of watching the footage and felt nauseated afterward.

The footage for Serene Velocity was shot over the course of one night. Gehr began filming once it was dark outside, planning to take a break for several hours and finish filming during sunrise. He started by alternating between focal lengths of 50 mm and 55 mm. After roughly 60 feet (18 m) of film, he moved each of the lengths apart by 5 mm, to 45 mm and 60 mm, then 40 mm and 65 mm, and so on. He marked off lengths in intervals of 5 mm on a piece of tape and gradually moved the lengths farther apart throughout filming. He manually recorded each frame, and without the use of a cable release his fingers became swollen from holding the shutter button. The process took longer than he had expected; he took only one break to use a restroom and held his head under water to keep awake.

== Analysis and interpretations ==
Serene Velocity shows a one-point perspective view of the hallway that divides it into the ceiling, walls, floor, and doors.

Watching Serene Velocity produces the appearance of motion and other optical effects, positioning it as a cinematic version of op art. Gehr has noted that the effects of watching the film vary significantly based on which part of the screen the viewer focuses on. The composition of the screen is divided into five sections: the ceiling's fluorescent lights and exit signs; the doors, water fountains, and ashtrays on the left and right walls; the reflections on the floor; and the doors in the center of the frame. The perspective lines point to the center of the frame, which would normally be the center of interest, but the motion along the margins of the frame draws attention away. Viewing the images as flat, two-dimensional spaces transforms the work into an abstract, flashing sign. Focusing on individual features of the successive images produces the illusion of motion. The illusion of depth perception can transform the image into an upright pyramid pointing into or out of the screen. Ken Jacobs emphasized this sense of thrusting and described Serene Velocity as a "sexual metaphor, or sex-become cinema", and J. Hoberman described it as a "piston-powered mandala".

Critics have often evaluated Serene Velocity as a metacinematic work. Noël Carroll pointed to the simplified procedure with which it was photographed as an example of minimalist cinema. Carroll wrote that the film, with its lack of movement, is an argument for "the impression of movement" as the essential characteristic of cinema. Critics have drawn parallels with Andy Warhol's 1964 film Empire, an extended, continuous shot of the Empire State Building. Both films advance a philosophical argument with a lack of movement and an emphasis on the recording process.

Gilberto Perez characterized the building's design as a descendant of Bauhaus architecture, calling it "barren and dehumanizing". He interpreted Serene Velocity as "neither a celebration–nor exactly a condemnation" of Bauhaus minimalism.

== Reception and legacy ==
Serene Velocity received a positive reaction from many of Gehr's contemporaries, including Ken Jacobs, Michael Snow, Hollis Frampton, Richard Foreman, Steve Reich, and Andrew Noren. However, the film received little coverage from the press upon its 1970 release, save for a mention by Jonas Mekas. In 1972, Bob Cowan wrote in his column for Take One that Serene Velocity was "one of the few really unique films I have seen during the last few years…It is rare that a film, which on the surface seems to be only a technical tour-de-force, can lift one to such emotional heights as it develops from surprise to surprise." Serene Velocity cemented Gehr's reputation as a structural filmmaker. He demurred to the term, stating "I don't know what that word really means–[Labels] stop people from actually seeing, actually experiencing the work."

Serene Velocity is part of Anthology Film Archives' Essential Cinema Repertory collection. In 2001, the United States Library of Congress deemed the film "culturally significant" and selected it for preservation in National Film Registry. The film was preserved in 2006 by The Museum of Modern Art, which enlarged the original 16 mm print to 35 mm.

Director Laura Poitras began making films while taking a course that Gehr taught at the San Francisco Art Institute. The first film Gehr screened was Serene Velocity, and Poitras has identified it as an influence on her work. For their 2008 short film Lossless #4, Rebecca Baron and Douglas Goodwin used a digital reproduction of Serene Velocity as source material. They fed it through a motion estimation algorithm to create a vector representation of the apparent motion in the film. In the 2012 Sight & Sound Poll of the Greatest Films of All Time, Noël Carroll listed Serene Velocity in his submission.

== See also ==
- List of American films of 1970
