= Signal—Germany on the Air =

- Directed by: Ernie Gehr
- Cinematography: Ernie Gehr
- Release date: November 16, 1985
- Running time: 37 minutes

Signal—Germany on the Air is a 1985 experimental film by Ernie Gehr.

== Synopsis ==
Signal begins with street scenes showing an intersection in West Berlin from different angles. These shots are accompanied only by the environmental noise and separated by brief flashes of white. The film moves to a vacant lot, marked by a billboard as having been the site of a Gestapo torture chamber. Upon returning to the original intersection, the film introduces a soundtrack of brief audio excerpts presented in the style of a radio broadcast. It moves to a nearby rail yard. The film's climax arrives with a sequence of panning shots in the intersection. After scenes of the intersection on a rainy day, Signal ends with a reel-end flare paired with the sound of thunder.

== Production ==
After making his 1981 short film Untitled (Part One) showing Brighton Beach in New York City, Gehr planned to make a second part but abandoned the idea for lack of funds. He began work on Signal through the German Academic Exchange Service and shot most of the film in 1982 during his stay in Berlin. He recorded additional footage during two later trips. Most of the film was shot on Kodachrome, which Gehr appreciated for its intense saturation. A separate section was shot on Fujifilm, giving it a softer appearance. Gehr recorded much of the soundtrack off of a radio.

The film's title alludes to Signal, a German photo journal which published propaganda during the Nazi period. Gehr created the title card by cropping the cover of an issue of Signal, to show its logo and two soldiers' helmets, and adding the film's subtitle.

== Release and reception ==
The film premiered at the Millennium Film Workshop in New York City on November 16, 1985.

Signal has been interpreted as dealing with the Holocaust and historical memory thereof. Gehr's parents were Jewish and lived in Berlin until 1939, shortly before he was born. Critic J. Hoberman, referencing a comment about Eugene Atget, said that the street scenes were filmed "as if they were the scene of a crime", to which Gehr responded that they were. Jeffrey Skoller contextualized the film within ethical questions of representing the Holocaust and described Gehr as "trying to move away from the purely visualizable as the basis for knowledge toward an encounter with the vast emptiness produced by the Shoah."

Harvey Nosowitz linked Signal to Gehr's earlier structural films, which were often analyzed as "self-contained formal constructs", and noted that it brought to the surface a recurring theme of "horror under the surface of daily life." Paul Arthur characterized it as a development of city symphony films like Berlin: Symphony of a Metropolis.

== Bibliography ==
- Arthur, Paul (2005). A Line of Sight: American Avant-Garde Film Since 1965. University of Minnesota Press. ISBN 978-0-8166-4264-9.
- Gunning, Tom (2025). The Attractions of the Moving Image. University of Chicago Press. ISBN 978-0-226-47979-8.
- Pötting, Sven (2020). "Ostwärts–Westwärts: Wege zur Wende im Kurzfilm". In Orth, Dominik; Preußer, Heinz-Peter (eds.). Mauerschau — Die DDR als Film (in German). De Gruyter. ISBN 978-3-11-062724-4.
- Skoller, Jeffrey (2005). Shadows, Specters, Shards: Making History in Avant-Garde Film. University of Minnesota Press. ISBN 978-0-8166-4231-1.
