= Side/Walk/Shuttle =

1991 American experimental film by Ernie Gehr

- Directed by: Ernie Gehr
- Distributed by: Canyon Cinema
- Release date: 1991
- Running time: 41 minutes
- Country: United States
- Language: English

Side/Walk/Shuttle is a 1991 American avant-garde film directed by Ernie Gehr. It shows downtown San Francisco as seen at different angles from a moving elevator.

== Description ==
In Side/Walk/Shuttle, the urban landscape is shown from unusual and disorienting perspectives.

The film's images are composed of 25 shots, with an average duration of around 90 seconds. The film shows the San Francisco cityscape as seen from an elevator moving up and down. The views use a variety of extreme camera angles, often featuring upside-down, sideways, or overhead shots. The film's sound track fades between scenes such as a takeout food counter, a man singing to himself, and crowd noises.

== Production ==
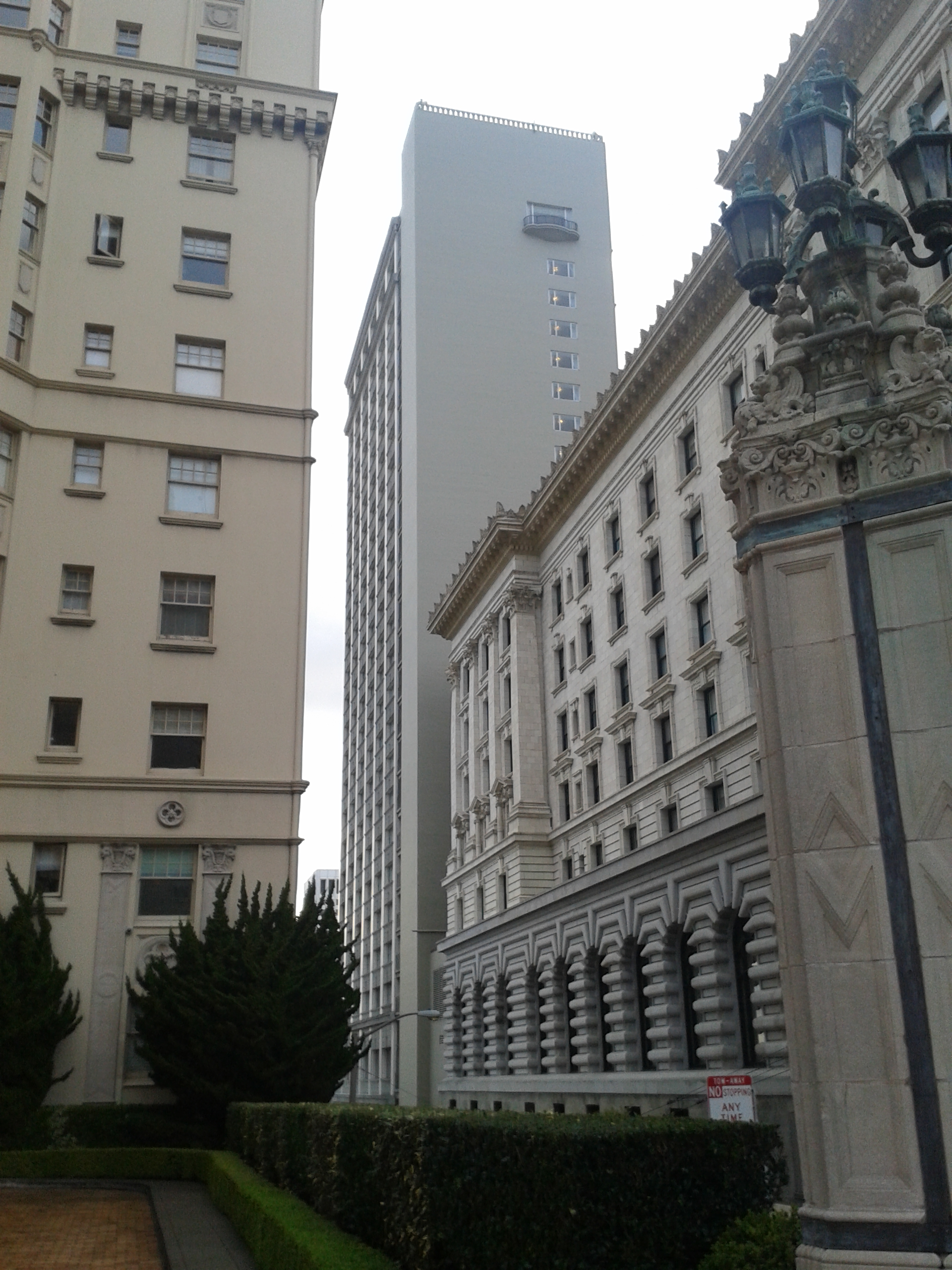
The film was shot from the tower of the Fairmont San Francisco.

Gehr made the film shortly after moving to San Francisco. Filming took place over the course of nearly a year at the Fairmont Hotel in San Francisco. He was interested in the topography of the city, and his process as shaped by "reflections on a lifetime of displacement, moving from place to place and haunted by recurring memories of other places [he] once passed through." He chose the location aware of its close proximity to where Eadweard Muybridge had photographed a panoramic view of the city.

The building had a glass elevator leading to a restaurant at the top, from which Gehr shot the entire film. He began by riding up and down the elevator, making notes and sketches about the angles at which he could position the camera. He filmed between 12:00 p.m. and 1:30 p.m. to minimize reflections on the elevator glass and shadows cast by surrounding buildings. Gehr filmed without asking permission from the hotel, not expecting to need it. After Gehr was asked to leave, he had his friend Adam Hohenberg request permission. The hotel denied their request, primarily because it would interfere with the restaurant's lunchtime rush. Gehr ended up shooting the film discreetly and was kicked out multiple times during production. He shot on 16 mm film with a Bolex camera that had to be hidden under his coat. Because he was unable to set up a tripod, the weight of the handheld Bolex became a major obstacle which prevented Gehr from filming some of the shots he had originally planned.

When Gehr edited the film, he spliced in some of the shots backward. This had the effect of not only flipping the orientation of the image in the film, but reversing the direction of the elevator in the shot and the movement of any objects visible at ground level. The soundtrack was created from cassette recordings Gehr had made in Grand Central Station in New York City, Geneva, Venice, London, and Berlin.

== Release ==
Side/Walk/Shuttle premiered at the San Francisco International Film Festival in 1991. It screened in the "Avant-Garde Visions" program of the 1992 New York Film Festival.

The Museum of Modern Art holds a film-preservation negative of Side/Walk/Shuttle, transferred onto 35 mm film.

== Reception ==
Manohla Dargis called the film a "masterpiece…that turns San Francisco and beyond into a mesmerizing Cubist tableau."

Slant Magazine ranked Side/Walk/Shuttle 100th on its list of the best films of the 1990s. J. Hoberman listed it as one of the best films of 1992 and later placed it 9th on his 1990s list.
