= Tonga Room =

Tiki-themed bar and restaurant in San Francisco

Tonga Room & Hurricane Bar
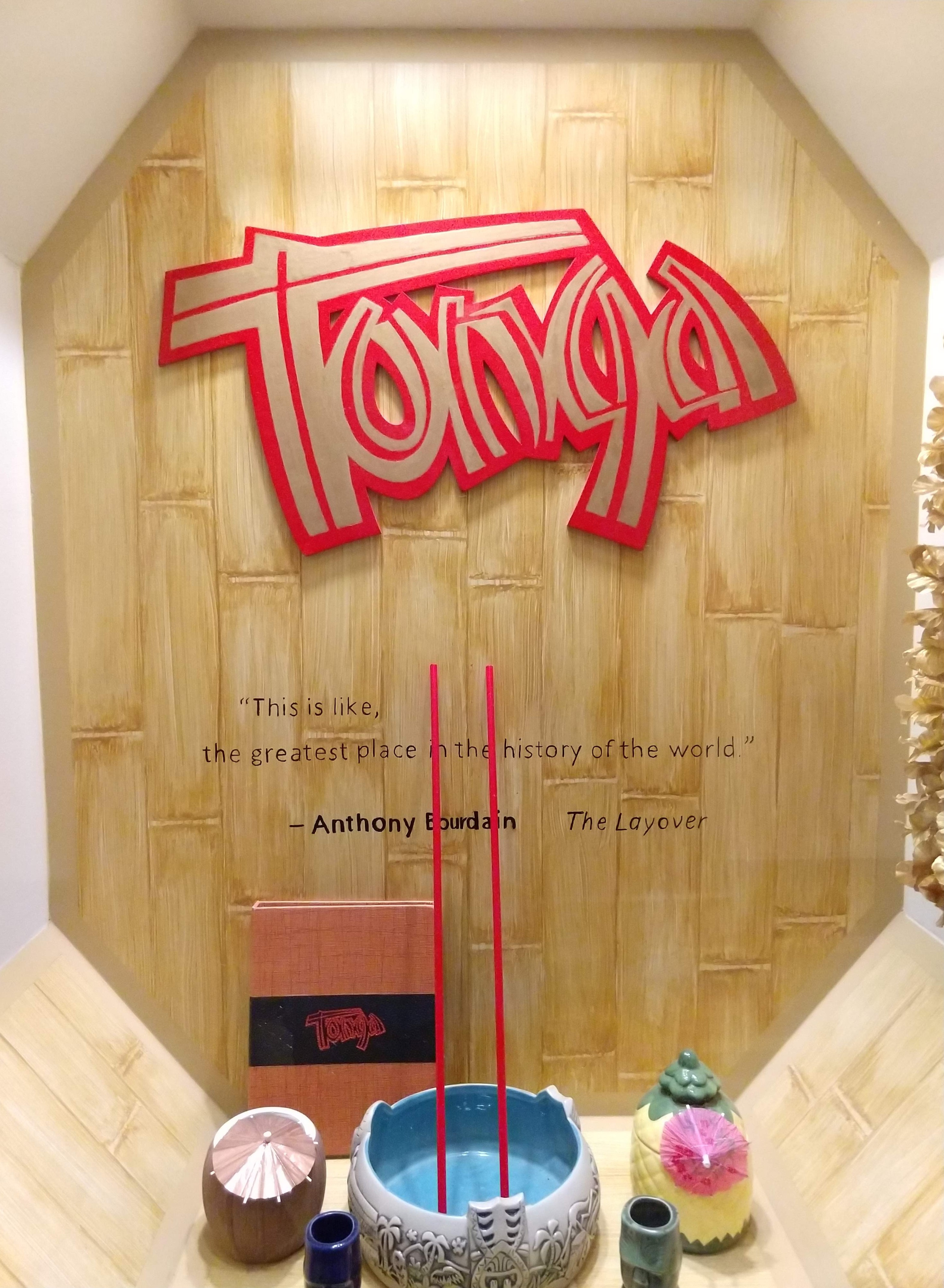
- A display window (2019) near the entrance to the Tonga Room
- Interactive map of Tonga Room & Hurricane Bar

Restaurant information
- Established: 1945; 81 years ago
- Location: Fairmont San Francisco, 950 Mason Street, San Francisco, California, United States
- Coordinates: 37.79214°N 122.41000°W

The Tonga Room & Hurricane Bar is a restaurant and tiki bar in the Fairmont San Francisco hotel in Nob Hill, San Francisco, California. Named after the South Pacific nation of Tonga, this dining and entertainment venue opened in 1945. The Tonga Room replaced the Terrace Plunge, an indoor swimming pool that was installed in the Fairmont in 1929. The pool was transformed into the Tonga Room's lagoon. The restaurant was redesigned again in 1967. In 2024, the Tonga Room started using new glassware, and moved away from ceramic tiki mugs.

A report by the City of San Francisco Planning Department called the Tonga Room a "historical resource." Citing the Polynesian-themed bar's artificial lagoon, rainstorms, and lava rock, the report said: "The Tonga Room exhibits exceptional importance due to its rarity and as one of the best examples of 'high-style' tiki bar/restaurant in San Francisco."

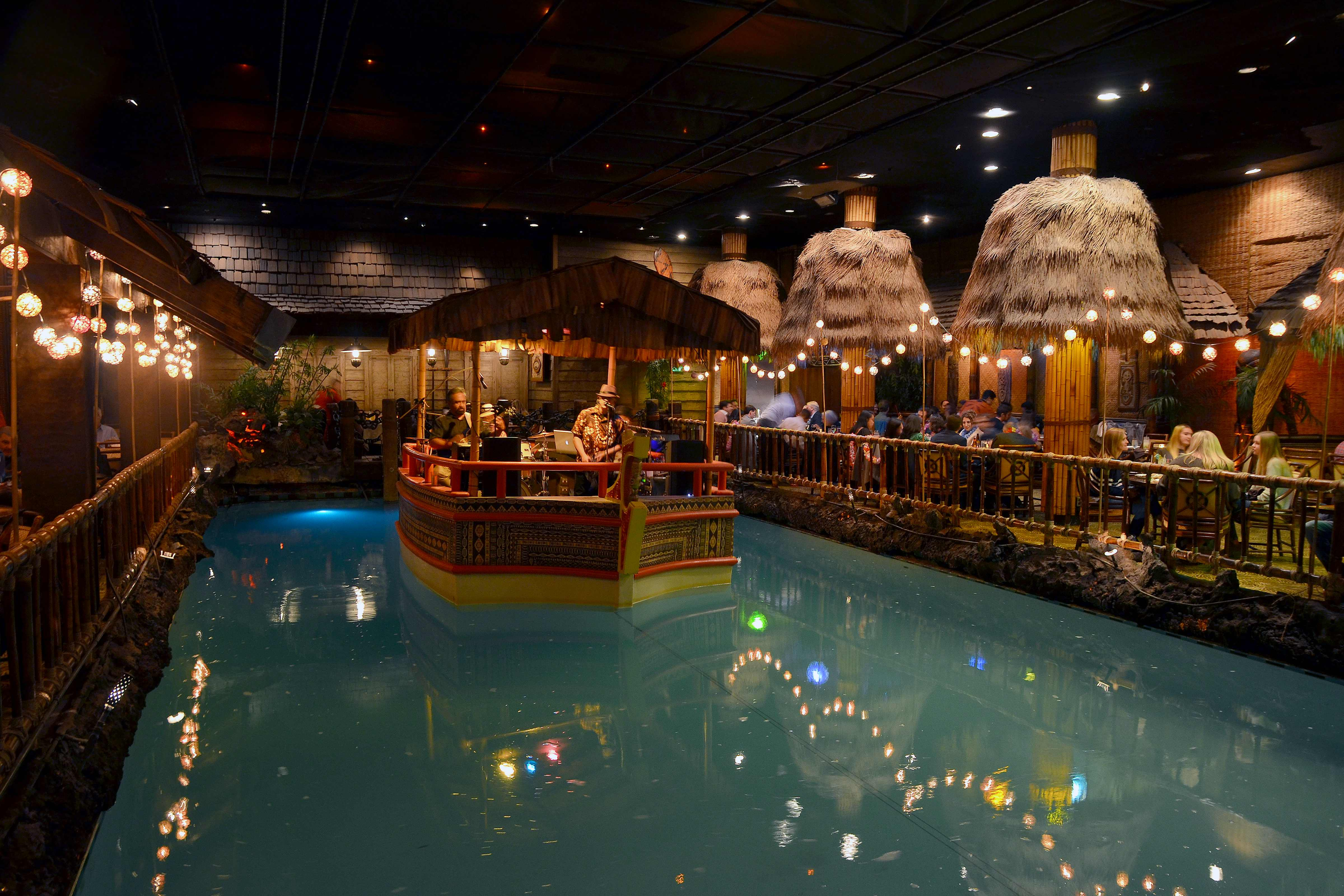
A boat with the band in the pool of the Tonga Room and Hurricane Bar

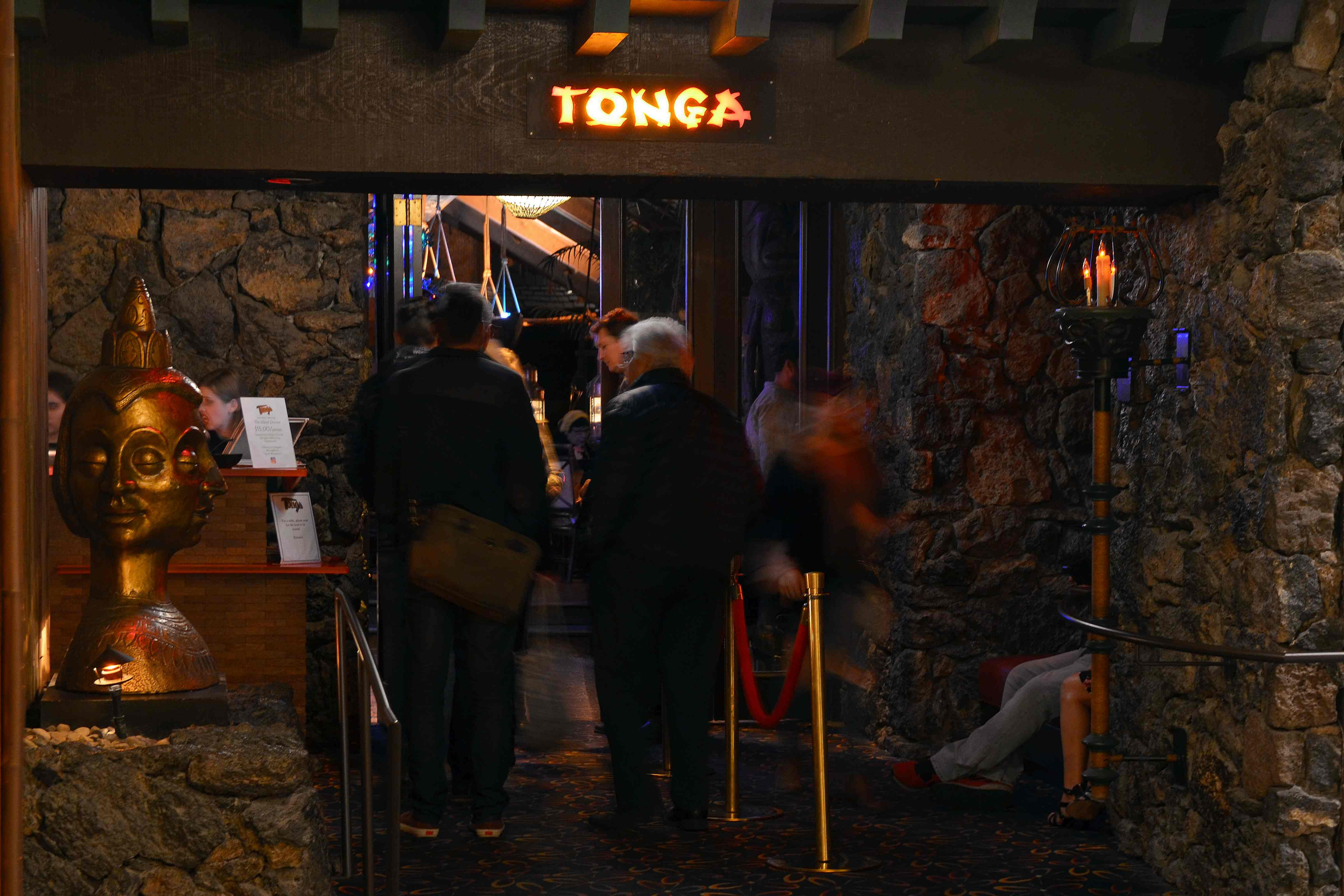
Entrance of the Tonga Room and Hurricane Bar

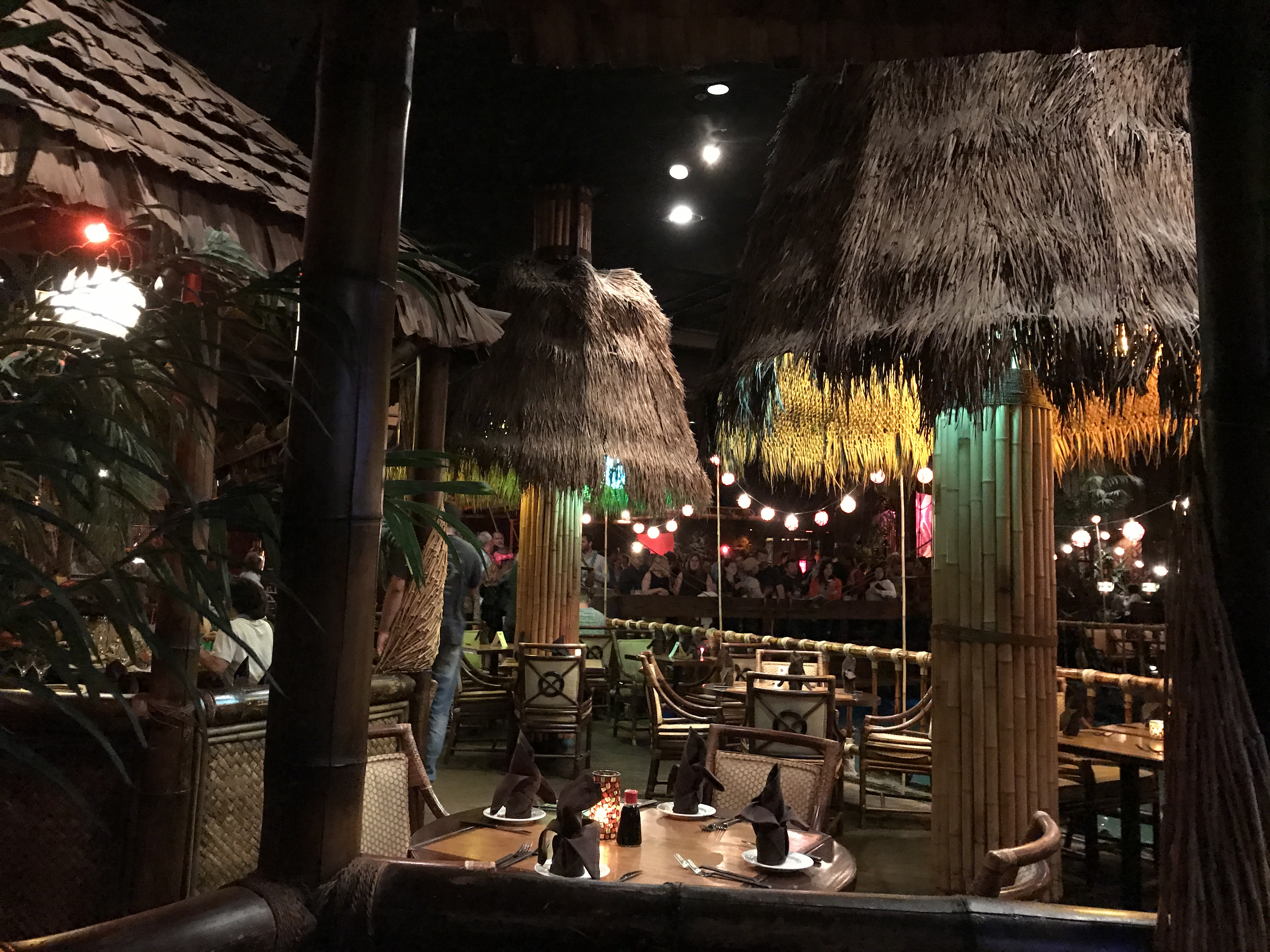
Tonga room restaurant looking towards Hurricane Bar
