= A Trip Down Market Street =

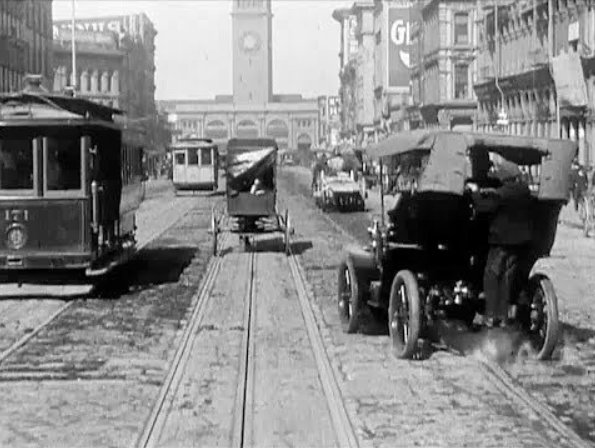
- Produced by: Miles Brothers
- Cinematography: Harry J. Miles
- Distributed by: Hale's Tours of the World
- Release date: April 21, 1906
- Running time: 13 minutes
- Country: United States
- Language: English

A Trip Down Market Street is a 1906 film shot from a cable car as it travels down Market Street in San Francisco. It is notable for capturing the city shortly before the 1906 San Francisco earthquake. The film shows details of daily life in a major early 20th-century American city, including the transportation, fashions and architecture of the era. The film begins at 8th Street and continues eastward to the cable car turntable, at the Embarcadero, in front of the Ferry Building. The perspective of seeing action only ahead and not the vehicle itself was known as a "phantom ride".

On April 17, two of the four Miles Brothers—Harry and Joseph—boarded a train for New York, taking the film with them, but they heard about the earthquake and sent the film to New York while they boarded another train headed back to San Francisco. This ultimately saved the film from destruction, as the Turk Street house of Earl Miles survived the earthquake and the subsequent catastrophic fire but the studio did not.

In 2010, the film was selected for preservation in the National Film Registry by the Library of Congress as being deemed "culturally, historically, or aesthetically significant." In 2016, newly discovered film footage of post-earthquake scenes filmed by the Miles Brothers, including that of a second trip down a now-devastated Market Street, re-emerged online. As a film published in 1906, it is in the public domain.

== Background ==
=== Filming date ===
The full film

The film was initially thought by the Library of Congress to have been made in September or October of 1905, based on the buildings seen to the left and right, and on the angles of sunlight and shadow. Film historian David Kiehn noticed that there were puddles of water seen in the street, and after he examined contemporary newspapers and weather reports, he realized that this estimate was wrong: no rain had fallen in those months. Kiehn located the February 1906 registration record for a car license plate recorded in the film, which confirmed the year of 1906, and he found that the sun's angle would be the same in March as it had been in September.

In 2009, Kiehn suggested that A Trip Down Market Street was filmed in late March or early April of 1906, a period with many rainy days reported. He found an advertisement for the film published in the New York Clipper on April 28, 1906, which stated that the film had been shot "just one week before the complete destruction of every building shown in the picture," though this was a somewhat hyperbolic claim given that a number of buildings seen in the film were heavily damaged and later repaired. Kiehn estimated the filming date as a one of a short span of days centered on April 12, but then he narrowed the date to April 14. Kiehn also found a San Francisco newspaper article published on March 29, 1906, describing the Miles Brothers' intent to film aboard a cable car.

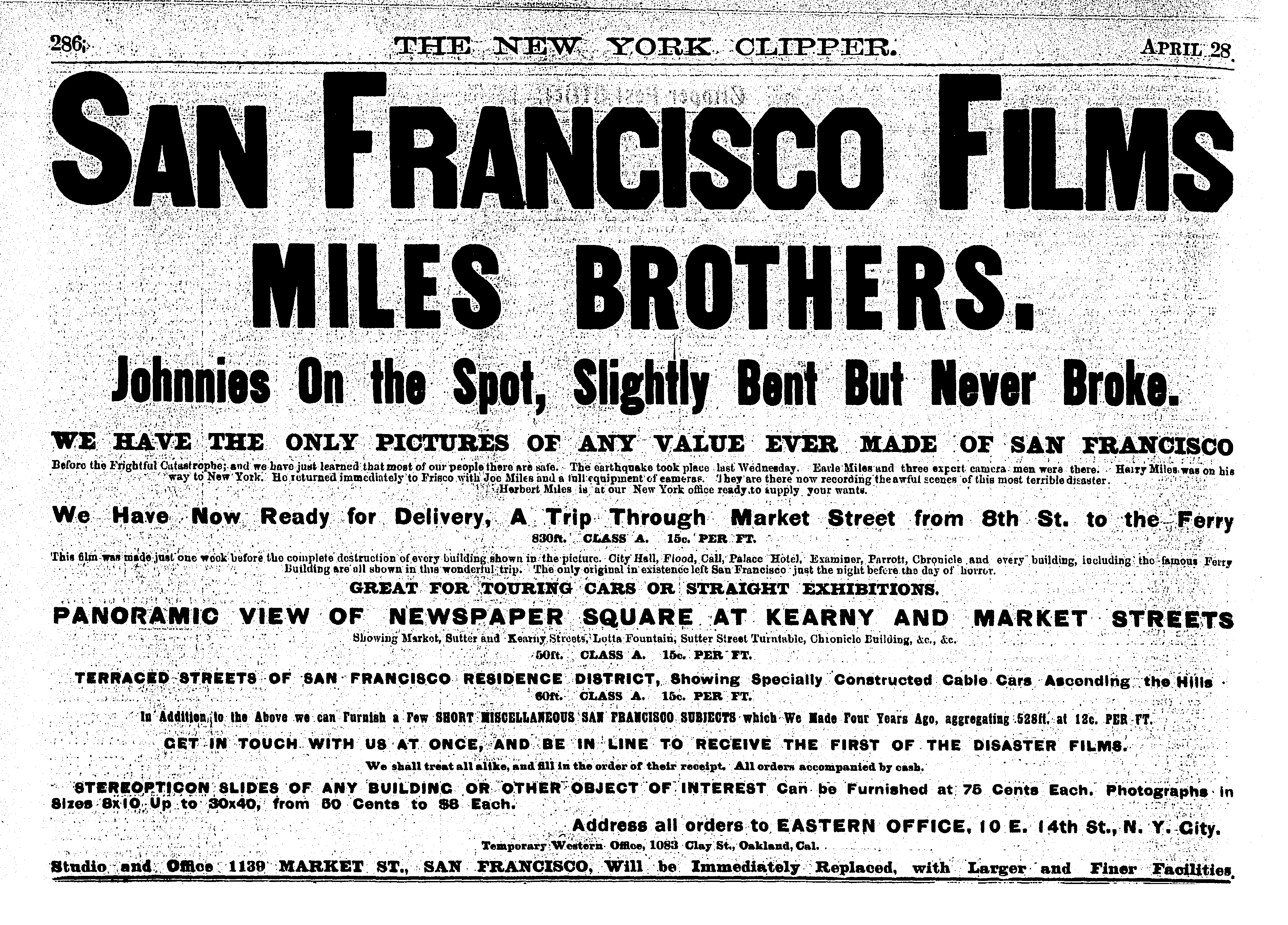
Miles Brothers advertisement for A Trip Down Market Street in the New York Clipper (April 28, 1906)

In 2011, Richard Greene, an engineer with Bio-Rad Laboratories, published research dating the film to March 24–30, 1906, based on the sun throwing well-defined shadows on the Ferry Building. Greene confirmed that the film was shot at about 3:17 p.m., based on the Ferry Building clock. He also notes that his date range is about three weeks prior to the earthquake, inconsistent with the "one week" claim in the New York Clipper advertisement.

=== Traffic ===
The film records a total of 30 cable cars, four horsecars, and four streetcars. At first there also appear to be many automobiles; however, a careful tracking shows that almost all of the autos circle the camera many times—one of them 10 times. This traffic was apparently staged by the producer to give Market Street the appearance of a prosperous modern boulevard with many automobiles. In 1906, the automobile was still something of a novelty in San Francisco, with horse-drawn buggies, carts, vans, and wagons being the common private and business vehicles. The near total lack of traffic control along Market Street emphasizes the newness of the automobile.

== Legacy ==
Four prints of the film are known to have survived. One was acquired by film scholar Ruth Perlmutter, one was acquired by the Library of Congress through the American Film Institute from a San Francisco projectionist, one is in the Prelinger Archives after being acquired by Rick Prelinger from a newsreel cameraman, and one was held by animator Ward Kimball. Ernie Gehr used a copy of Perlmutter's print to make his 1979 experimental film Eureka. Historian David Kiehn, a co-founder of Niles Film Museum in Niles, California, a museum devoted to Essanay Studios, who spent several months studying the film, told CBS News, "[The film] captures something that nobody today has seen any more. It makes a connection. Young and old. They still react with amazement." In 2010, A Trip Down Market Street was selected for preservation in the National Film Registry by the Library of Congress.
