= The Hilarious Posters =

1906 film by Georges Méliès

- Directed by: Georges Méliès
- Starring: Georges Méliès; Vilbert
- Production company: Star Film Company
- Release date: 1906
- Country: France
- Language: Silent

The Hilarious Posters (French: Les Affiches en goguette) is a 1906 French silent trick film by Georges Méliès. It was sold by Méliès's Star Film Company and is numbered 821–823 in its catalogues.

== Plot ==
On a large canvas-and-wood billboard, a man glues a poster showing two stars of L'Amour à crédit, a show at the Parisiana music hall. It is surrounded by posters showing other figures, advertising various products: Poirot meat extract, Tripaulin paint, Nouveau Dépôt porcelain, Poudre de Fées face powder, Quinquina au Cacao liqueur, Trouillottine lamps, and Mignon corsets. The man leaves, and two gendarmes pass by.

As soon as the coast is clear, the people shown in the posters begin coming to life. The two Parisiana stars leave their poster entirely and walk around, busily talking to the residents of the other posters. A fracas breaks out when one of the stars begins flirting with the corset model, and the porcelain vendor drops his wares onto the ground. The figures turn back into flat images as the gendarmes pass by again.

As a well-dressed gentleman crosses in front of the posters, they come alive again and begin throwing all their wares at him. The two gendarmes and two officers rush onto the scene, and all four are soon covered with face powder, powdered paint, and other products. The whole billboard comes toppling down with a crash, revealing the poster residents in real life behind a fence. As the police set the billboard to rights and look through the torn posters, they see all the poster residents dance happily off.

== Production ==
The Hilarious Posters was probably commissioned by Victor de Cottens for showing as part of the 1905 edition of the annual Folies Bergère revue. (Though the descriptions of the show do not mention Méliès, he is credited in the program, and a scene closely resembling the action of the film is described in a surviving copy of the script.) The film may have been inspired by Gaston Velle's film La Valise de Barnum (Pathé, 1904), in which a man shows various posters and the figures in them come to life.

Of the posters shown, "Tripaulin" parodies the paint brand Ripolin; "Mignon" may be the corset brand Mystère, for whom Méliès had made an advertising film; "Nouveau Dépôt" is the Grand Dépôt, a crockery shop; and the Parisiana was a real Paris music hall on the Grands Boulevards, run by the same producer who helmed the Folies, Paul Ruez. L'Amour à crédit, the Parisiana show being advertised, had begun running on 26 August 1905.

Méliès appears in the film as the man who glues the posters, with Vilbert, one of the headlining acts at the Parisiana, playing himself on his poster. The special effects in the film are created by substitution splices and, for the Tripaulin poster, a carefully worked multiple exposure with the three painters filmed at a much greater distance than the rest of the action.
