= Dream of a Rarebit Fiend (film) =

- Dream of a Rarebit Fiend
- Directed by: Wallace McCutcheon; Edwin S. Porter
- Written by: Winsor McCay (comic strip)
- Starring: Jack Brawn
- Cinematography: Edwin S. Porter
- Distributed by: Edison Manufacturing Company
- Release date: February 19, 1906
- Running time: 6 minutes
- Country: United States
- Language: Silent

Dream of a Rarebit Fiend is a 1906 silent trick film directed by Edwin S. Porter for Edison Manufacturing Company. It is a seven-minute live-action film adaptation of the comic strip Dream of the Rarebit Fiend by American cartoonist Winsor McCay. The film was marketed as using several special effects in which "some of the photographic 'stunts' have never been seen or attempted before."

In 2015, the United States Library of Congress selected the film for preservation in the National Film Registry, finding it "culturally, historically, or aesthetically significant".

== Plot ==
The Rarebit Fiend gorges on Welsh rarebit at a restaurant. When he leaves, he begins to get dizzy as he starts to hallucinate. He desperately tries to hang onto a lamppost as the world spins all around him. A man helps him get home. He falls into bed and begins having more hallucinatory dreams.

During a dream sequence, the furniture begins moving around the room. Imps emerge from a floating Welsh rarebit container and begin poking his head as he sleeps. His bed then begins dancing and spinning wildly around the room before flying out the window with the Fiend in it.

The bed floats across the city as the Fiend floats up and off the bed. He hangs off the back and eventually gets caught on a weathervane atop a steeple. His bedclothes tear and he falls from the sky, crashing through his bedroom ceiling. The Fiend awakens from the dream after falling out of his bed.

== Production and release ==
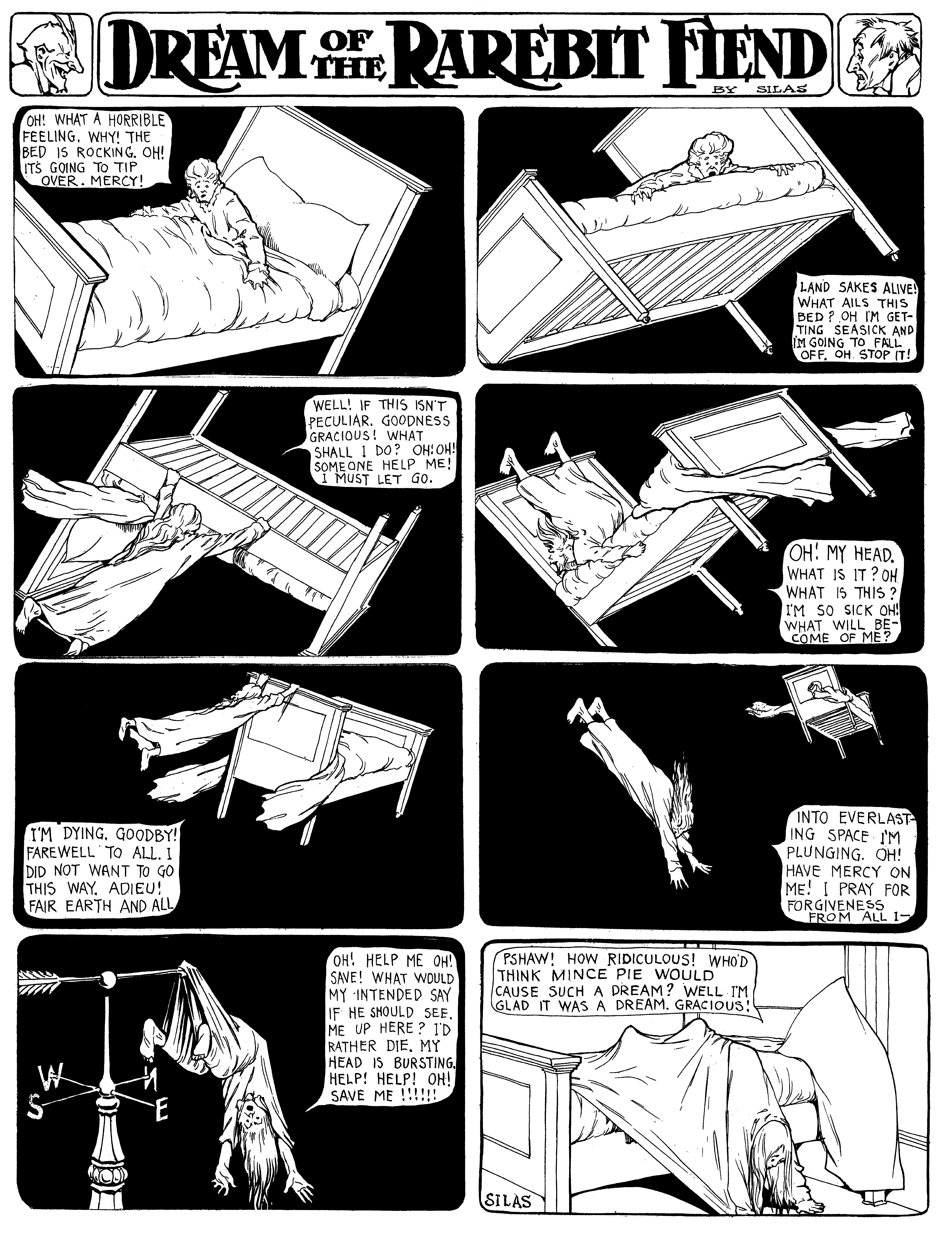
The January 28, 1905, Dream of the Rarebit Fiend comic strip upon which the film was based

The Fiend was played by John P. "Jack" Brawn.

The Edison Military Band performed a piece called "Dream of the Rarebit Fiend" on an Edison cylinder (Edison 9585) in 1907, written by Thomas W. Thurban. The piece was likely inspired by Porter's 1906 film, and may have been intended to accompany it. The piece was written for 18–20-piece band, and has been recorded numerous times.

== See also ==
- Edwin S. Porter filmography

== Works cited ==
- Dover editors (1973). Dreams of the Rarebit Fiend. Dover Publications, Inc. ISBN 978-0-486-21347-7.
- Goldmark, Daniel (2007). "Before Willie: Reconstructing Music and the Animated Cartoon of the 1920s". In Goldmark, Daniel; Kramer, Lawrence (eds.). Beyond the Soundtrack: Representing Music in Cinema. University of California Press. pp. 225–245. ISBN 978-0-520-25070-3.
