= Ernie Gehr =

American experimental filmmaker (born 1941)

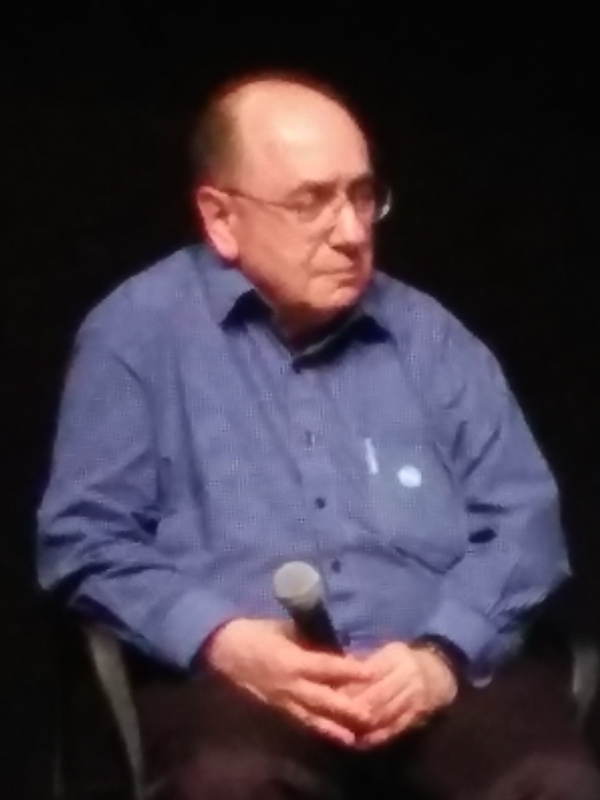
- Ernie Gehr in July 2017
- Born: July 20, 1941 (age 84)
- Known for: Experimental film

Ernie Gehr (born 1941) is an American experimental filmmaker closely associated with the Structural film movement of the 1970s. A self-taught artist, Gehr was inspired to begin making films in the 1960s after chancing upon a screening of a Stan Brakhage film. Gehr's film Serene Velocity (1970) has been selected for preservation in the United States National Film Registry. Gehr served as faculty at the San Francisco Art Institute.

The New York Times described Gehr's work as "abstract, beautiful, mysterious, invigorating, utopian" saying he had "embraced [the] Modernist cry, shunning mainstream narrative to make films in which bubbling grain, streaks of color and pulses of light are the main attraction." His film Essex Street Quartet (2004) was included in the exhibition "The Long Run" at The Museum of Modern Art, New York, from November 11, 2017, to November 4, 2018.

== Filmography ==
- Morning (1968)
- Wait (1968)
- Reverberation (1969)
- Transparency (1969)
- Field (1970)
- Serene Velocity (1970)
- Still (1969–1971)
- Shift (1972–1974)
- Eureka (1974)
- Table (1976)
- Untitled (1977)
- Mirage (1981)
- Untitled: Part One (1981)
- Signal—Germany on the Air (1982–1985)
- Side/Walk/Shuttle (1991)
- Rear Window (1986/1991)
- This Side of Paradise (1991)
- For Daniel (1997)
- Glider (2001)
- Precarious Garden (2004)
- The Morse Code Operator/The Monkey Wrench (2006)
- Before The Olympics (2006)
- Whispers (2008)
- New York Lantern (2008)
- Photographic Phantoms (2014)
- A Commuter's Life (What a Life!) (2015)
