= The Automobile Thieves =

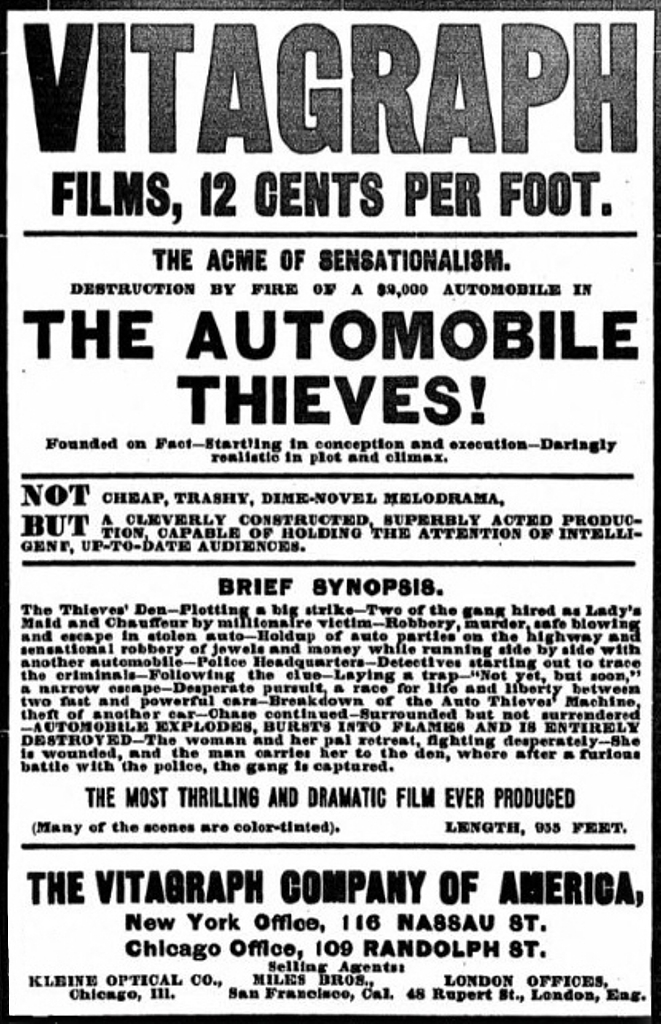
- Advertisement in The New York Clipper
- Directed by: J. Stuart Blackton
- Starring: J. Stuart Blackton; Florence Lawrence
- Production company: The Vitagraph Company of America
- Distributed by: The Vitagraph Company of America
- Release date: November 10, 1906
- Running time: 955 feet (11 minutes)
- Country: United States
- Language: Silent

The Automobile Thieves is an American crime-drama silent film directed by J. Stuart Blackton. The picture stars Blackton and Florence Lawrence. It was released on November 10, 1906 by The American Vitagraph Company; a print of the feature is preserved in the UCLA Film and Television Archive.

== Synopsis ==
Synopsis by Vitagraph in The New York Clipper (November 1906)

In The Thieves' Den, a gang of criminals plans a major robbery. Two of its members take jobs as a lady's maid and chauffeur for a wealthy victim. The gang carries out a robbery involving murder and the use of explosives to break open a safe before escaping in a stolen car. They later hold up motorists on the highway, stealing jewellery and money while driving alongside another vehicle.

At police headquarters, detectives begin investigating the crimes and following clues to track down the gang. Their pursuit leads to a series of narrow escapes and a high-speed chase between two powerful cars. After the criminals' vehicle breaks down, they steal another car and continue their escape. Although eventually surrounded, they refuse to surrender. Their car explodes and catches fire, forcing the woman and her accomplice to retreat while fighting off the police. The woman is wounded, and the man carries her back to the gang's hideout. Following a fierce confrontation with the police, the entire gang is captured.

== Cast ==
- J. Stuart Blackton - Male robber
- Florence Lawrence - Female accomplice

== Background ==
In an advertisement in The New York Clipper, dated 1906, Vitagraph proclaimed that there was a "destruction by fire of a $2,000 automobile" and the picture was "founded on fact - startling in conception and execution - daringly realistic in plot and climax...not cheap, trashy, dime-novel melodrama, but a cleverly constructed, superbly acted production capable of holding the attention of intelligent, up-to-date audience".

This was Florence Lawrence's first movie; she went on to star in more Vitagraph films, but her real name never appeared on the credits. She later went to work with Biograph Studios and after marrying Harry Solter, she moved to Independent Moving Pictures Company of America (IMP). It was at Independent where Lawrence achieved her first real success with The Broken Oath. As a result of her new found popularity, she earned the nickname - "The First Movie Star". She has also been referred to as "The Vitagraph Girl", "The Biograph Girl" and after her move to Independent, "The Imp Girl". Lawrence went on to make over 300 films in her career.
