= Miles Brothers =

Early American film studio

Squires vs Burns, the 1907 fight for the heavyweight title

Harry J., Herbert, Joseph and Earl C. Miles, known together as the Miles Brothers, were pioneers in American cinema who established the first motion picture exchanges in the United States in 1902.

== The Miles Brothers' Exchange ==
According to film historian Lewis Jacobs, the Miles Brothers' Exchange, established by Harry and Herbert Miles, was "one of the most important and profitable developments in motion picture history".

Prior to the exchange system, each exhibitor purchased films directly from the filmmakers, which was a substantial investment. The Miles brothers, who neither made nor showed films, bought up films and rented these to exhibitors at one-fourth the purchase price. Jacobs writes:

Such a plan was heartily welcomed everywhere. The exchange man could continue to rent out films long after they had more than paid for themselves; his profits were large. Manufacturers now had one large customer who practically guaranteed to buy most of their output at higher prices; and they enjoyed an increased market for pictures because exhibitors, paying less for them, could more frequently change their programs...

Jacobs adds that the variety of program offerings, in turn, stimulated attendance, raising profits for exhibitors. Widely adopted, the exchange system introduced by the Miles Brothers led to rivals for the lucrative trade. By 1907, there were over a hundred exchanges operating in major cities throughout the United States.

== A Trip Down Market Street (1906) ==
Their 1906 film A Trip Down Market Street is an historic 13-minute journey down Market Street in San Francisco from 8th Street to the Embarcadero. It provides a rare view of the street four days before the 1906 San Francisco earthquake. The film was long thought to have been made in September 1905, after being dated as such by the Library of Congress based on the state of construction of several buildings.

Film historian David Kiehn, a co-founder of Niles Film Museum in Niles, California, a museum devoted to Essanay Studios, dated the film to the spring of 1906 from automobile registrations and weather records. Kiehn eventually found promotional materials from the film's original release. The Miles Brothers sent the film to New York City by train the night before the earthquake, which destroyed the San Francisco studio where it had been kept. Three prints survive as of 2010, and the film has been digitally restored.

== Sources ==
- Jacobs, Lewis (1967). The Rise of the American Film: Experimental Cinema in America, 1921-1947. New York: Teachers College Press, Columbia University. LCCN 68-25845.
