= Collage film =

Film assembled entirely from found footage

Collage film is a style of film created by juxtaposing found footage from disparate sources (archival footage, excerpts from other films, newsreels, home movies, etc.). The term has also been applied to the physical collaging of materials onto film stock.

== Surrealist roots ==
The surrealist movement played a critical role in the creation of the collage film form. In 1936, the American artist Joseph Cornell produced one of the earliest collage films with his reassembly of East of Borneo (1931), combined with pieces of other films, into a new work he titled Rose Hobart after the leading actress. When Salvador Dalí saw the film, he was famously enraged, believing Cornell had stolen the idea from his thoughts. Predecessors include Adrian Brunel's Crossing the Great Sagrada (1924) and Henri Storck's Story of the Unknown soldier (Histoire du soldat inconnu) (1932).

The idea of combining film from various sources also appealed to another surrealist artist André Breton. In the town of Nantes, he and friend Jacques Vaché would travel from one movie theater to another, without ever staying for an entire film.

== Renaissance ==
A renaissance of found footage films emerged after Bruce Conner's A Movie (1958). The film mixes ephemeral film clips in a dialectical montage. A famous sequence made up of disparate clips shows "a submarine captain [who] seems to see a scantily dressed woman through his periscope and responds by firing a torpedo which produces a nuclear explosion followed by huge waves ridden by surfboard riders." Conner continued to produce several other found footage films including Report and Crossroads among others.

Working at the National Film Board of Canada (NFB) in the 1960s, Arthur Lipsett created collage films such as Very Nice, Very Nice (1961) and 21-87 (1963), entirely composed of found footage discarded during the editing of other films (the former earning an Academy Award nomination). French filmmaker Edouard de Laurot made politically charged collage documentaries such as Black Liberation (1967) and Listen, America (1968) during this period as well.

In 1968, the young Joe Dante made The Movie Orgy, considered an analog precursor to online mashup videos and supercuts, with producer Jon Davidson that featured outtakes, trailers and commercials from various shows and films. (Similar to this cinematic mixtape both in content and humor are 2012's Trailer War and 2020's The AGFA Horror Trailer Show with the former under Dante's supervision.)

== Examples since the 1970s ==
Other notable users of this technique are Chuck Workman with his 1986 Oscar-winning Precious Images, Rick Prelinger known for his use of home movies and ephemeral films on meditative projects like 2004's Panorama Ephemera, Wheeler Winston Dixon known for his 1972 examination of TV advertising Serial Metaphysics, Craig Baldwin in his films Spectres of the Spectrum, Tribulation 99 and O No Coronado and Bill Morrison who used found footage lost and neglected in film archives in his 2002 work Decasia (which alongside Kevin Rafferty's 1982 Cold War satire The Atomic Cafe were inducted to the National Film Registry). A similar entry in the found footage canon is Peter Delpeut's Lyrical Nitrate (1991).

The technique was employed in the 2008 feature film The Memories of Angels, a visual ode to Montreal composed of stock footage from over 120 NFB films from the 1950s and 1960s. Terence Davies used a similar technique to create Of Time and the City, recalling his life growing up in Liverpool in the 1950s and 1960s, using newsreel and documentary footage supplemented by his own commentary voiceover and contemporaneous and classical music soundtracks. Penny Woolcock's 2012 lyrical portrait From the Sea to the Land Beyond uses footage from the BFI National Archive to create a romantically nostalgic mood piece of Britain's relationship to its coastline.

Christian Marclay's The Clock, a 24-hour compilation of time-related scenes from movies, debuted at London's White Cube gallery in 2010. Marclay made several forays into video art that informed The Clock with his 1995 film Telephones, forming a narrative out of clips from Hollywood films where characters use a telephone, and his 1998 film Up and Out combining video from Michelangelo Antonioni's Blowup with audio from Brian De Palma's Blow Out. The latter was an early experiment in the effect of synchronization, where viewers naturally attempted to find intersections between the two works, and it developed the editing style that Marclay employs for The Clock. Paul Anton Smith, assistant editor on Marclay's The Clock, made a similar reconstruction with his 2016 piece about the movie-going experience Have You Seen My Movie?. Other examples of reconstructing mainstream cinema are Guy Maddin's 2017 cine-eassy The Green Fog, a patchwork recreation of Alfred Hitchcock's 1958 thriller Vertigo using clips from other films and TV shows set in San Francisco, and the installation works of Candice Breitz.

A similar art installation by Scottish artist Douglas Gordon, 24 Hour Psycho (1993) consists entirely of an appropriation of Hitchcock's 1960 psychological horror film Psycho, slowed down to approximately two frames per second from its original 24. As a result, the film lasts for precisely 24 hours, rather than the original running time of 109 minutes (1 hour, 49 minutes). A century later, New York-based artist Chris Bors responded by tweaking the film as 24 Second Psycho while accommodating the short attention span of an information age society. Other re-edits of classic movies includes Anne McGuire's Strain Andromeda The (1992) in which Robert Wise's 1971 sci-fi feature The Andromeda Strain is reconstructed shot-by-shot in reverse order of sequences, Matt Bucy's Of Oz the Wizard (2004) in which scenes from MGM's 1939 film adaptation of The Wizard of Oz are re-ordered and alphabetized to dizzying results and David Claerbout's The Pure Necessity (2016) taking Disney's 1967 animated adaptation of The Jungle Book by removing human characters such as Mowgli (alongside the narrative and musical numbers) and redrawing frames of Baloo, Bagheera and other notable animal characters to perform tranquil movements.

The 2016 experimental documentary Fraud (by Dean Fleischer Camp, later known for the Oscar-nominated Marcel the Shell with Shoes On) was sourced from over a hundred hours of home video footage uploaded to YouTube by an unknown family in the United States. The footage was combined with additional clips appropriated from other YouTube users and transformed into a 53-minute crime film about a family preoccupied with material consumption going to extreme lengths in order to get out from under unsustainable personal debt.

Scottish poet Ross Sutherland made his 2015 feature film debut Stand By for Tape Back-Up, consisting of recordings from an old VHS tape left by his late grandfather.

Canadian experimental filmmaker Stephen Broomer's first feature work was Potamkin (2017). The film is about the late pioneering film critic Harry Alan Potamkin (1900-1933), who was one of the first to proclaim cinema as an art form. Potamkin is composed of fragments from the many films he reviewed for newspapers and magazines during the 1920s and 1930s (e.g. Battleship Potemkin, The Passion of Joan of Arc and Metropolis). Other Canadian collage filmmakers in a similar vein are Christina Battle, David Rimmer and Richard Kerr.

Other acclaimed examples of 21st century collage cinema include Raoul Peck's I Am Not Your Negro (2016), Brett Morgen's Grammy Award-winning Moonage Daydream (2022) and the works of Hungarian filmmaker Péter Lichter.

=== Notable collage documentaries ===
- Room 237 (2012)
- The Dead Nation (2017)
- Brother, Can You Spare a Dime? (1975)
- Los Angeles Plays Itself (2003)
- Tarnation (2003)
- June 17th, 1994 (2010)
- Senna (2010)
- Waking Sleeping Beauty (2010)
- Our Nixon (2013)
- 102 Minutes That Changed America (2008)
- We Wish To Inform You We Didn't Know (2010)
- Amy (2015)
- Dawson City: Frozen Time (2016)
- Nobody's Business (1996)
- The World of Tomorrow (1984)
- LA 92 (2017)
- The Endless Film (2018)
- Another Hayride (2021)
- Rewind & Play (2022)
- Fantastic Machine (2023)
- Incident (2023)
- The Best of Me (2024)
- America, Lost and Found (1979)
- American Dreams: Lost and Found (1984)
- American Murder: The Family Next Door (2020)
- The White House Effect (2024)
- The Perfect Neighbor (2025)
- Sawyer Avenue, Sunday Afternoon (2026)

== Comedies ==
Some of the earliest surrealist collage works were humorous. This tradition of using film collage for comedic effect can later be seen in commercial films such as Woody Allen's first film, What's Up, Tiger Lily? (1966) in which Allen took Key of Keys, a Japanese spy film by Senkichi Taniguchi, re-edited parts of it and wrote a new soundtrack made up of his own dialogue for comic effect, and Gerald Potterton's 1971 animated satire Tiki Tiki with animated primates utilizing scenes from Rolan Bykov's subversive fairytale musical Ayboilt–66.

Carl Reiner's 1982 comedy Dead Men Don't Wear Plaid incorporated footage from approximately two dozen classic film noir films along with original sequences with Steve Martin.

Canadian video artist Todd Graham is known for his 1987 cult fan film Apocalypse Pooh, a bizarrely comedic mash-up of Disney's Winnie the Pooh and Francis Ford Coppola's 1979 Vietnam War epic Apocalypse Now.

The 1976 postcard collage Black Forest Trading Post, made by experimental Canadian filmmakers Andrew Lugg and Stuart Klein, sandwiched a postcard image of a Pennsylvania souvenir shop with different improbable and ludicrous backgrounds.

== Physical film collaging ==
Some filmmakers have taken a more literal approach to collage film. Stan Brakhage created films by collaging found objects between clear film stock, then passing the results through an optical printer, such as in Mothlight and The Garden of Earthly Delights.

Another notable collage film that also used this technique is Fruit Flies (2010) by Canadian artist Christine Lucy Latimer similar to Mothlight.

== Animation ==
Examples of animated collage film (which uses clippings from newspapers, comics and magazines alongside other inanimate objects):

- Frank Mouris's Academy Award-winning Frank Film (1973)
- Mike Jittlov's Animato (1977)
- Our Lady of the Sphere (1969)
- Fast Film (2003)
- The films of Lewis Klahr and Janie Geiser
- Charles Braverman's American Time Capsule (1968)
- Heaven and Earth Magic (1962)
- The works of Stan Vanderbeek, Terry Gilliam and Robert Breer
- The aforementioned Mothlight (1963) and The Garden of Earthly Delights (1981)
- Erodium Thunk (2018)
- The Timekeepers of Eternity (2021)
