= Louise Bourque =

French-Canadian film director

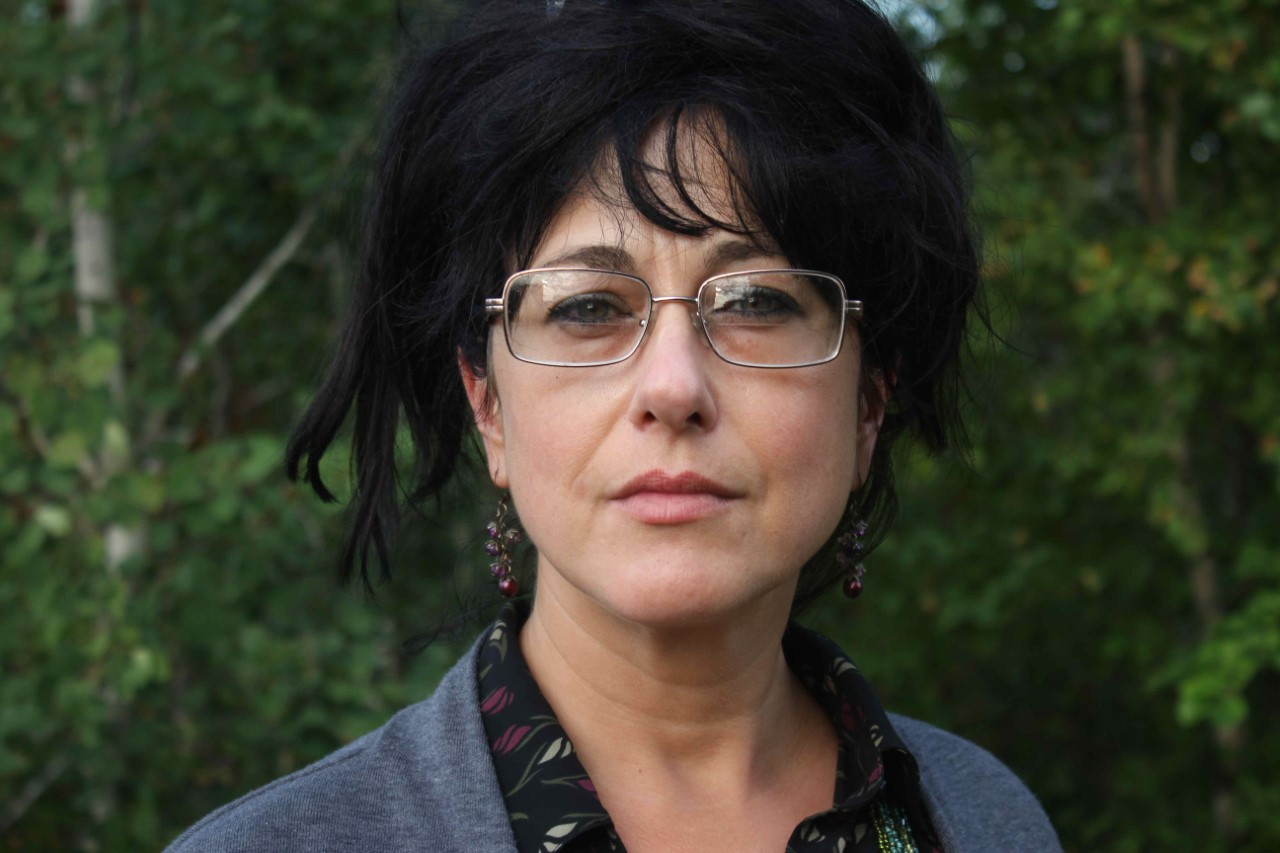
Portrait of filmmaker Louise Bourque

Louise Bourque (born 1963) is an Acadian French Canadian experimental filmmaker.

== Background and career ==
She taught cinema in her native Edmundston and in Boston, Mass. She lives in Montreal after a 25-year absence. She had a relationship with fellow filmmaker Joe Gibbons in the late 1990s before breaking up.

Since 1989, her works involve physical manipulation of emulsion and imprints of memory and trauma using her own home movies and other types of found footage.

== Selected filmography ==
- Bye Bye Now (2022)
- The Bleeding Heart of It (2006)
- Self Portrait Post Mortem (2002)
- Going Back Home (2001)
- The People in the House (1994)
- Just Words (1991)

== See also ==
Other female Canadian collage filmmakers similar in content:

- Christina Battle
- Christine Lucy Latimer
