= The Man Who Could Not Sleep =

1915 film by John H. Collins

The Man Who Could Not Sleep was a 1915 silent film by Edison Studios. The film is now considered a lost film with known extant copies nearly informationless because of nitrate decomposition. It was directed by John H. Collins and based on a script by Mark Swan. It starred Marc McDermott, Julia Calhoun, and Charles Sutton. Footage was featured in Decasia, an American collage film by director Bill Morrisson.

The plot involved a judge named Jeffer (Marc McDermott) who is cursed by a woman to be unable to sleep after an unfair sentence.
