= Truthful Tulliver =

1917 film

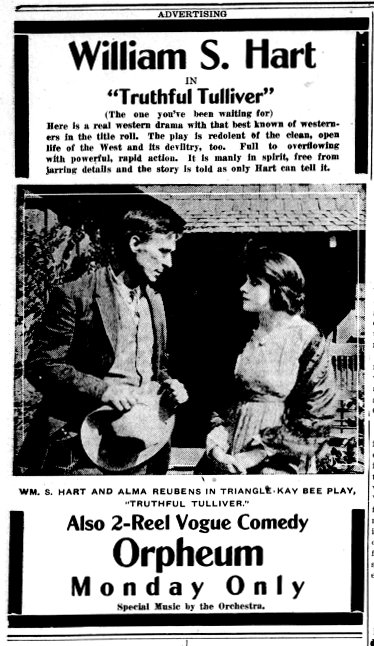
- newspaper ad for the film
- Directed by: William S. Hart
- Written by: J.G. Hawks
- Produced by: Thomas H. Ince
- Starring: William S. Hart; Alma Rubens; Nina Byron
- Cinematography: Joseph H. August
- Production companies: Kay-Bee Pictures; New York Motion Pictures
- Distributed by: Triangle Distributing
- Release date: January 7, 1917
- Running time: 50 minutes
- Country: United States
- Languages: Silent; English intertitles

Truthful Tulliver is a 1917 American silent Western film directed by William S. Hart and starring Hart, Alma Rubens and Nina Byron. Footage was featured in Decasia, an American collage film by director Bill Morrisson.

== Plot ==
Truthful Tulliver is a frontiersman turned newspaper editor who sets up shop in Glory Hole, a lawless border town. While standing at the news office window with Easterner York Cantrell, Truthful sees two sisters, Grace and Daisy Burton, being insulted by drunken customers of the 40 Red Saloon. "Deacon" Doyle manages the saloon but Cantrell secretly owns it. The next day, Truthful runs an editorial in his paper condemning the 40 Red Saloon. Truthful rides his horse into the saloon, lassos Doyle, and drags him behind his horse out of town. Later, Doyle returns and attempts to shoot Truthful. Meanwhile, Daisy confesses to Grace that Cantrell has wronged her and Grace tells this to Truthful. Truthful, who is in love with Grace, misunderstands and thinks Grace wants Cantrell. As Cantrell tries to leave town, Truthful intercepts him. They clear up the misunderstanding, Cantrell decides to marry Daisy, and Truthful embraces Grace warmly.

== Cast ==
- William S. Hart as Truthful Tulliver
- Alma Rubens as Grace Burton
- Nina Byron as Daisy Burton
- Norbert A. Myles as York Cantrell
- Walter Perry as Silver Lode Thompson
- Milton Ross as Deacon Doyle

== Bibliography ==
- Ronald L. Davis. William S. Hart: Projecting the American West. University of Oklahoma Press, 2003.
