= AGFA Horror Trailer Show =

2020 compilation film

The AGFA Horror Trailer Show is a 2020 compilation film compiled by the American Genre Film Archive on 35mm film under the alias Miss N. Limbs (and released on Blu-ray by Vinegar Syndrome January 26, 2021) consisting of horror film trailers unseen since their original theatrical releases alongside drive-in inserts, ads and the 1969 cult animated short Bambi Meets Godzilla. A follow-up, The Cult of AGFA Trailer Show (directed by Joseph A. Ziemba and Bret Berg, who are also known for other collaborative efforts such as Hey Folks! It's the Intermission Time Mixtape!) was released in 2023.

== List of notable films featured ==
- Body Melt (1993)
- Demon Wind (1990)
- Hobgoblins (1988)
- Psychos in Love (1987)
- Blood Hook (1987)
- Nightmare Weekend (1986)
- Evil Laugh (1986)
- Splatter University (1984)
- Scalps (1983)
- The Slayer (1982)
- Final Exam (1981)
- Fear No Evil (1981)
- The Worm Eaters (1977)
- Prey (1977)
- Drive-In Massacre (1976)
- Old Dracula (1974)
- The Man with Two Heads (1972)
- Carnival of Blood (1972)
- The Velvet Vampire (1971)
- I Eat Your Skin (1971)
- I Drink Your Blood (1971)
- The Corpse Grinders (1971)
- Terror, sexo y brujería (1968/1984)
- The Undertaker and His Pals (1966)
- The Embalmer (1965)
- The Incredibly Strange Creatures Who Stopped Living and Became Mixed-Up Zombies (1963; under the title The Teenage Psycho Meets Bloody Mary)
- The Brainiac (1962)
- The Robot vs. the Aztec Mummy (1958)

=== List of notable films featured on The Cult of AGFA Trailer Show ===
- Strangers with Candy (2005)
- Psycho Beach Party (2000)
- The Manson Family (1997)
- The Doom Generation (1995)
- Suture (1993)
- Meatballs 4 (1992)
- Robotrix (1991)
- Robocop 2 (1990)
- Frankenhooker (1990)
- Meet the Feebles (1989)
- The Decline of Western Civilization II: The Metal Years (1988)
- Brain Damage (1988)
- Munchies (1987)
- Blood Diner (1987)
- Rad (1986)
- Cocaine Wars (1985)
- The Peanut Butter Solution (1985)
- Starchaser: The Legend of Orin (1985)
- Rainbow Brite and the Star Stealer (1985)
- Tuff Turf (1985)
- Body Rock (1984)
- Slapstick of Another Kind (1984)
- Forbidden Zone (1982)
- Escape from New York (1981)
- Times Square (1980)
- Foxes (1980)
- C.H.O.M.P.S. (1979)
- Eraserhead (1977)
- Death Race 2000 (1975)
- Pinocchio's Birthday Party (1973)

== The AGFA Horror Trailer Show: Videorage ==
Released as a bonus feature, The AGFA Horror Trailer Show: Videorage features trailers from shot-on-video and direct to video horror flicks from the 1980s-1990s along with a few Nollywood titles thrown in.

=== List of notable films featured on Videorage ===
- Spiritual Challenge (2003)
- Bloody Muscle Body Builder in Hell (1995)
- The Secret Life: Jeffrey Dahmer (1993)
- The Burning Moon (1992)
- Things (1989)
- Woodchipper Massacre (1988)
- Cannibal Campout (1988)
- Death Nurse (1987)
- Terror at Tenkiller (1986)
- Blood Cult (1985)
- The Ripper (1985)
- The Last Slumber Party (1984)
- A Night to Dismember (1983)
- The Long Island Cannibal Massacre (1980)

== See also ==
- Trailer War
- Mystery Science Theater 3000
- The Movie Orgy
