= Hey Folks It's Intermission Time =

Hey Folks It's Intermission Time is a collection of six videotapes featuring drive-in advertisements and snipes from the 1940s up to the 1970s compiled by Something Weird Video starting in the 1990s by founder Mike Vraney.

== Follow-up ==
The 70-minute compilation mixtape, entitled Hey Folks! It's the Intermission Time Mixtape!, was curated by Joseph A. Ziemba and Bret Berg (best known for their 2023 feature Cult of AGFA Trailer Show) and released on a two-disc Blu-ray "video party" set alongside the original VHS compilations in 2024.

== Soundtrack ==
An album featuring excerpts from the 1957 animated classic Let's All Go to the Lobby and others alongside selected musical sections was released on August 11, 2023 by Modern Harmonic.

== See also ==
- Trailer War
- The Movie Orgy
