= Harry Alan Potamkin =

American film critic

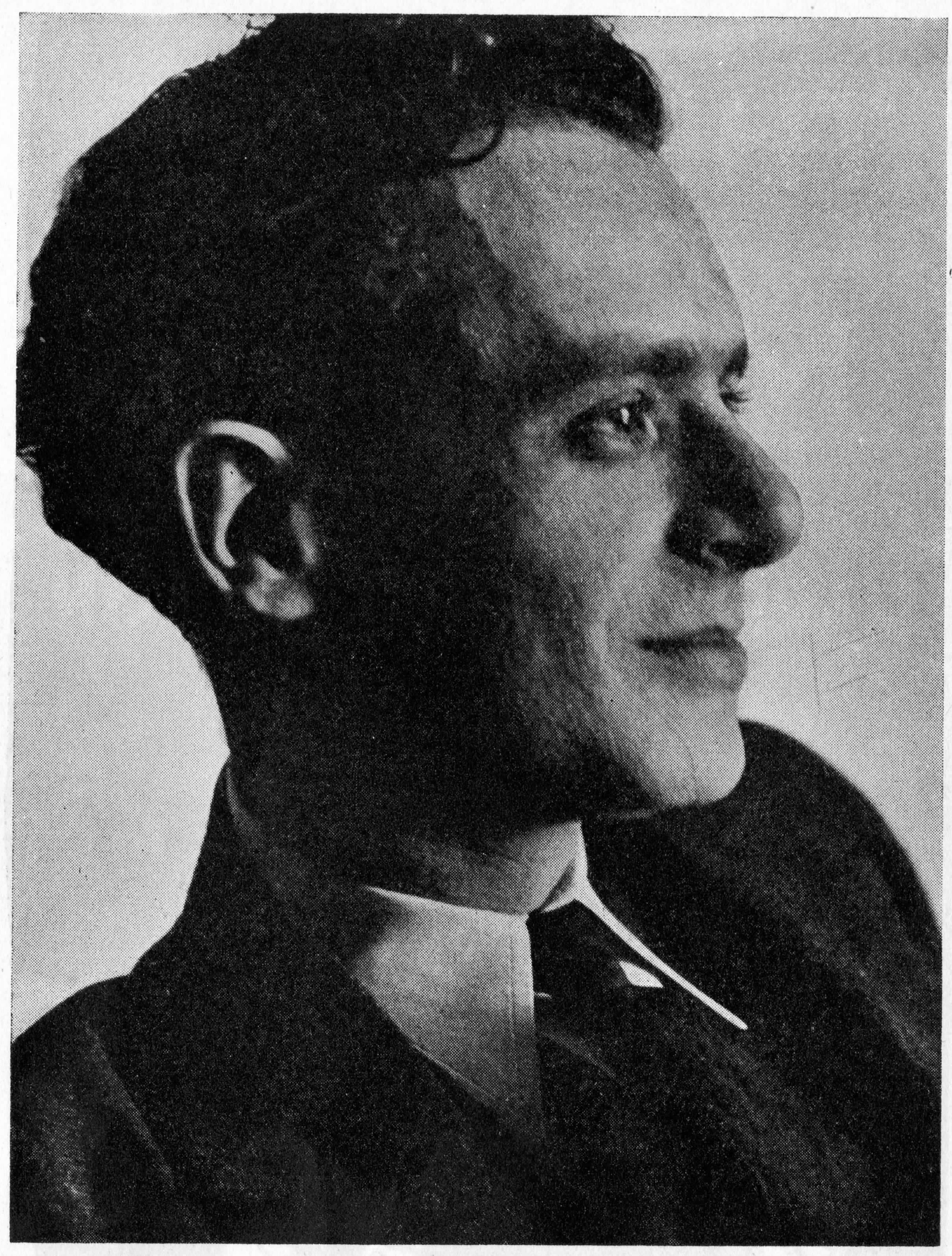
Potamkin c. 1934

Harry Alan Potamkin (April 10, 1900 – July 19, 1933) was an American film critic and poet.

== Biography ==
Potamkin was born in Philadelphia, to Jewish parents who had immigrated from Russia. His sister was the mother of composer Milton Babbitt. Potamkin received a BS degree from New York University in 1921 and worked as a social worker at Smith Memorial Playground in Philadelphia. On his 1925 honeymoon to France, Potamkin discovered film in Paris and was inspired to become a film critic. Potamkin visited the Soviet Union in 1927, where he met with Sergei Eisenstein and Grigori Aleksandrov. In 1930, Potamkin traveled to Kharkiv for the second Congress of the International Union of Revolutionary Writers, in the American delegation along with Joshua Kunitz, William Gropper, and other members of the John Reed Clubs.

== Career ==
His film criticism was published in a wide variety of publications, including The Daily Worker, American Cinematographer, and Hound & Horn. In his writings, Potamkin compared Hollywood films unfavorably to Soviet cinema, though he distinguished between movies produced in Hollywood and ones made in New York. Hollywood, for Potamkin, was "the pimple of the American process, just as America is the pimple of the capitalist process" In several articles, he criticized Charlie Chaplin's films, arguing that they placed too much emphasis on Chaplin's fictional persona instead of class dynamics. Potamkin has been described as the first American film critic to recognize film as a medium that "played an active role in shaping the society that produced it". He proposed a plan for a Marxist film school and library, which, due to his death in 1933, was never realized.

Potamkin was also active as a poet, though Kenneth Rexroth wrote that "the character of the Left press at that time prevented him from being widely published". A collection of his poetry, titled In the Embryo of All Things: The Poems of Harry Alan Potamkin, was published in 2017. He was the author of the operetta Strike Me Red, performed posthumously in 1934, and directed by Will Lee.

== Death and legacy ==
After his death, his funeral was held at the New York Workers School, due to his "revolutionary activity in the workers' struggles". Potamkin's writings inspired experimental filmmaker Stephen Broomer's 2017 feature film Potamkin, which uses footage from the films he reviewed (e.g. Battleship Potemkin, The Passion of Joan of Arc and Metropolis).

== See also ==
- Collage film
- Art film
- Social realism
