= I Was Impaled =

Television series

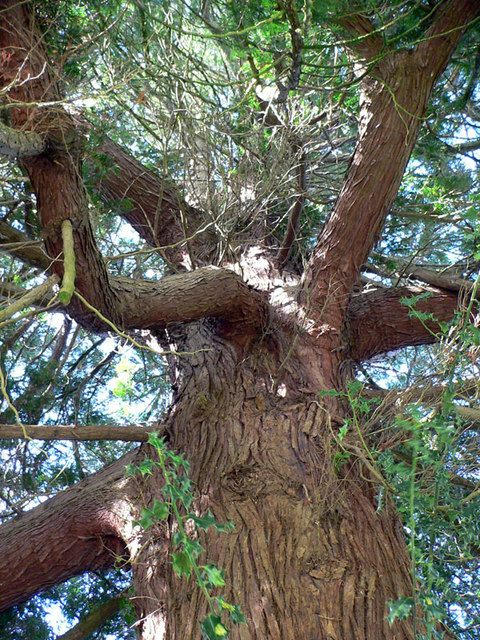
In one episode of I Was Impaled, a woman riding in a truck on a dirt road was impaled by a two-inch thick branch of an evergreen tree similar to this one which broke through the passenger's side window; the branch penetrated her neck and shoulder, but she was saved by medical personnel.

I Was Impaled is an hour-long reality television docuseries show which depicts incidents in which real people were impaled on non-human objects and yet survived. Each hour-long show consists of four separate episodes. It is produced by a British production company entitled Twofour, and shown in the United States on the Discovery Fit & Health channel. and the show aired in Europe, the Middle East, Africa and Latin America under the name Body Invaders. Foreign objects which punctured human bodies include fence posts, garden shears, bicycle pole. The show chronicled the medical rescue involving first responders such as emergency medical technicians as well as doctors who saved the person's life.

== Reception ==
Chicago Tribune critic A. J. Marechal described the show as "bizarre tales of objects being ingested or impaling people's bodies." Critics for National Public Radio, when they first learned of the show's title, wondered whether it was "some kind of rogue intern prank". New York Times critic Neil Genzlinger found the title, itself, to be "jolting". The Oregonian critic Kristi Turnquist thought the show sounded like an "April Fool's joke", but noted how with "cutting edge animation", the show shows "everything", including the horrifying moment of entry to elation at removal of the object. She wrote:

What could this be about? Oh, gee, I dunno, maybe it's stories of people who were IMPALED? And really, who wouldn't want to watch that while sharing quality time with the whole family? Maybe after having grilled a couple of skewers of chicken and veggies out in the backyard. Yum.

— Kristi Turnquist of The Oregonian, 2012

Feminist critic Gwendolyn Audrey Foster described the show as "almost entirely shorn of narrative and any sense of morality." She elaborated:

Bodily harm and gruesome depravity is still presented with lip-smacking relish, as if the entire affair was some sort of ghastly freak show for our depraved amusement. Impalements, horrifying moments, and ghoulish bodily dismemberments are edited together for shock value, though they become almost boring and numbing as a result of their generic display. We become completely numb and pain becomes dull.

— Gwendolyn Audrey Foster in Film International, 2012
