= Quarterly Review of Film and Video =

Academic journal covering moving image studies

- Discipline: Film studies
- Language: English
- Edited by: Vera Dika

Publication details
- Former name: Quarterly Review of Film Studies
- History: 1976-present
- Publisher: Routledge
- Frequency: 8/year

Standard abbreviations
- ISO 4: Q. Rev. Film Video

Indexing
- ISSN: 1050-9208 (print); 1543-5326 (web)
- LCCN: 76001361
- OCLC no.: 719766643

Links
- Journal homepage; Online access; Online archive

The Quarterly Review of Film and Video is a peer-reviewed academic journal covering moving image studies, considered to be among the best-known journals in this field. It is published by Routledge. From 1999 to 2014, Wheeler Winston Dixon and Gwendolyn Audrey Foster were the editors-in-chief of the journal; on December 23, 2014 David Sterritt became the new editor of the journal. The journal is currently edited by Vera Dika.

== History ==
The founding editor was Ronald Gottesman, who began the journal in the middle 1970s. Later editors have included Katherine S. Kovács and Michael Renov. The journal was established in 1976 as the Quarterly Review of Film Studies, obtaining its current title in 1989. It was one of a few journals in the early 21st century which published critical essays about controversial topics.

== Scope ==
The journal covers film history, theory, production, and reception of film, film criticism, video games and installations from various perspectives.

== Abstracting and indexing ==
The journal is abstracted and indexed in:

- British Humanities Index
- Communication Abstracts
- EBSCOhost
- Family Index Database
- Film Literature Index
- International Index to Film Periodicals
- Media Review Digest
- MLA International Bibliography
- Scopus
- Sage Communication Abstracts

== See also ==
- List of film periodicals
