= The Source (1918 film) =

1918 film by George Melford

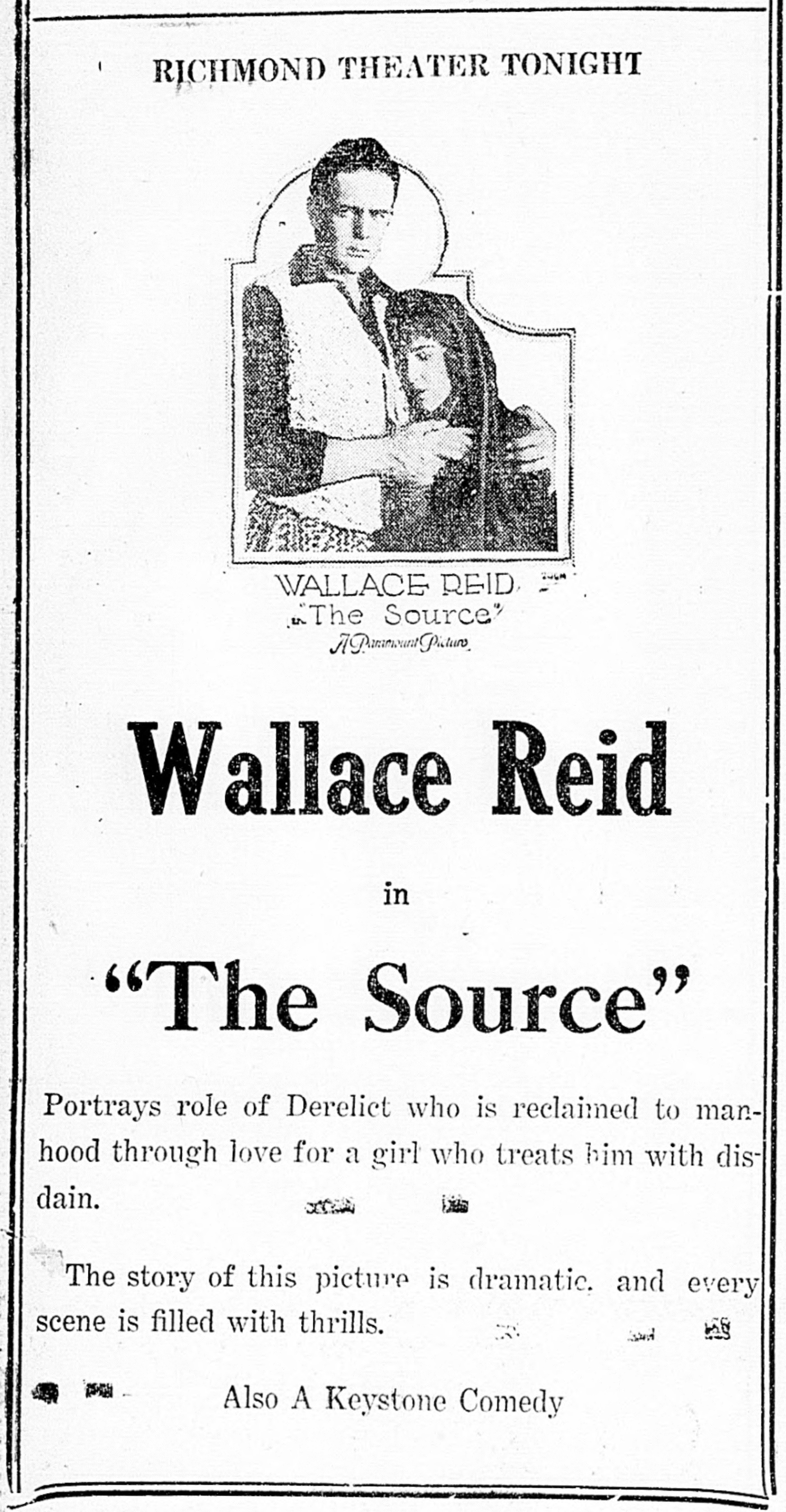
- Contemporary newspaper advertisement
- Directed by: George Melford
- Screenplay by: Monte M. Katterjohn; Clarence Budington Kelland
- Produced by: Jesse L. Lasky
- Starring: Wallace Reid; Ann Little; Theodore Roberts; Raymond Hatton; James Cruze; Noah Beery Sr. Nina Byron
- Cinematography: Paul P. Perry
- Production company: Jesse L. Lasky Feature Play Company
- Distributed by: Paramount Pictures
- Release date: September 8, 1918
- Running time: 50 minutes
- Country: United States
- Language: English

The Source is a lost 1918 American drama silent film directed by George Melford and written by Monte M. Katterjohn and Clarence Budington Kelland. The film stars Wallace Reid, Ann Little, Theodore Roberts, Raymond Hatton, James Cruze, Noah Beery Sr. and Nina Byron. The film was released on September 8, 1918, by Paramount Pictures.

== Plot ==
As described in a contemporary newspaper, the story is about a bad man who finds his way based on the disdain of a lovely young girl.

== Cast ==
- Wallace Reid as Van Twiller Yard
- Ann Little as Svea Nord
- Theodore Roberts as Big John Beaumont
- Raymond Hatton as Pop Sprowl
- James Cruze as Langlois
- Noah Beery Sr. as John Nord
- Nina Byron as Ruth Piggins
- Charles West as Paul Holmquist
- Gustav von Seyffertitz as Ekstrom
- Charles Ogle as 'Sim-Sam' Samuels (*Charles Stanton Ogle)
