= Dawson City: Frozen Time =

2016 film

- Film poster
- Directed by: Bill Morrison
- Written by: Bill Morrison
- Produced by: Bill Morrison; Madeleine Molyneaux
- Edited by: Bill Morrison
- Music by: Alex Somers
- Production companies: Hypnotic Pictures; Picture Palace Pictures
- Distributed by: Kino Lorber; Cineteca Bologna
- Release date: September 5, 2016 (Venice)
- Running time: 120 minutes
- Country: United States
- Language: English
- Box office: $111,619

Dawson City: Frozen Time is a 2016 American documentary film written, edited, and directed by Bill Morrison, and produced by Morrison and Madeleine Molyneaux. First screened in the Orizzonti competition section at the 73rd Venice International Film Festival, the film details the history of the remote Yukon town of Dawson City, from the Klondike Gold Rush to the 1978 Dawson Film Find: a discovery of 533 nitrate reels containing numerous lost films. The recovered silent films, buried beneath a hockey rink in 1929, included shorts, features, and newsreel footage of various events, such as the 1919 World Series.

== Synopsis ==
The 1978 discovery of 533 reels of nitrate film beneath the permafrost of a decommissioned swimming pool, later known as the Dawson Film Find, serves to frame a narrative of the Klondike Gold Rush, the dawn of 20th century America, Hollywood in the silent era, and the history of the town of Dawson City, Yukon, Canada.

Contents of the unearthed reels help portray the story of Dawson City: how native lands of the Trʼondëk Hwëchʼin became a frontier, a boomtown, and an entertainment hub, before industrial monopolies and poverty of resources ensued. The 1957 documentary City of Gold captured Dawson in the shadow of its former glory.

The film utilizes a number of silent film techniques, consistent with the subject matter, including intertitles in place of voice-over narration, as well as archival sound and a prominent musical score. Brief interviews with those who saved the reels have a more contemporary documentary style. Those sequences include the recounting of the film cache's discovery, and of how the problem of delivering such chemically volatile objects was handled. Commercial delivery services refused to transport the film reels, so, ultimately, the Canadian Armed Forces were assigned to transport them to their final destinations in Ottawa and Washington D.C.

== Themes ==
The film begins with a description of the dangers of flammable nitrate film. This offers some insight into the fragility of the cinematic medium, the archive, and perhaps history itself. The story of Dawson City is repeatedly framed in terms of loss, with decay foregrounded by the introduction, the brooding score, and the story itself. Another focus is the history of exploitation in Dawson City, implying a parallel between the economic apparatus of the Klondike Gold Rush and that of the motion picture industry.

== Production ==
Bill Morrison had initially intended for this project to result in something similar to his 12-minute short The Film of Her (1996), but he came to envision a broader scope as his work on it progressed. Morrison was able to recruit Alex Somers as composer after learning that the band Sigur Ros, with whom Somers collaborates, were fans of his previous film Decasia (2002).

Michael Gates and Kathy Jones-Gates, employees of Parks Canada and the Dawson Museum, respectively, were two of the early authorities on the Dawson City Film Find. Morrison filmed an interview with them both in 2014, though he did not originally plan to include the footage in the final film.

== Critical response ==
Dawson City: Frozen Time received positive reviews from critics. On the review aggregator website Rotten Tomatoes, 100% of 62 critics' reviews of the film are positive, with an average rating of 8.10/10; the site's "critics consensus" reads: "Dawson City: Frozen Time takes a patient look at the past through long-lost film footage that reveals much more than glimpses at life through the camera's lens." On Metacritic, the film has a weighted average score of 86 out of 100, indicating "universal acclaim".

Kenneth Turan of the Los Angeles Times wrote: "If you love film, if you’re intoxicated by the way movies combine image and emotion, be prepared to swoon." Glenn Kenny of The New York Times praised the film "as an instantaneously recognizable masterpiece." Deborah Eisenberg, writing in the New York Review of Books, summarized: "Dawson City: Frozen Time is nominally a documentary—it is a documentary—but describing it as a documentary is something like describing Ulysses as a travel guide to Dublin. The film is transfixing, an utterly singular compound of the bizarre, the richly informative, the thrilling, the horrifying, the goofy, the tragic, and the flat-out gorgeous."

The film appeared on more than 100 critics' lists of the best films of 2017, and on numerous lists of the best films of the 2010s, including those from the Associated Press, the Los Angeles Times (Kenneth Turan), and Vanity Fair (Richard Lawson).
