= Death Nurse 2 =

- DVD released by Slasher // Video
- Directed by: Nick Millard
- Written by: Nick Millard
- Produced by: Irmgard Millard
- Starring: Nick Millard; Priscilla Alden; Albert Eskinazi; Irmgard Millard; Frances Millard
- Production company: I.R.M.I. Films Corporation
- Distributed by: Slasher // Video
- Release date: 1988 (United States)
- Running time: 60 minutes
- Country: United States
- Language: English

Death Nurse 2 is a 1988 slasher film written and directed by Nick Millard. It is the sequel to the 1987 film Death Nurse.

== Plot ==
Picking up where the prequel ended, Death Nurse 2 opens with Lieutenant Cal Bedowski demanding to be let into Shady Palms Clinic after discovering human remains in the facility's garage. Nurse Edith Mortley opens the door, stabs the lieutenant, and has her brother, Doctor Gordon Mortley, place the man's body in the garage. Edith then explains that disposing of corpses in the garage is the perfect system, as they will be eaten by the rats that infest it, and the rats will then be killed and fed to unknowing patients of the Mortleys.

At city hall, Sergeant David Gallagher pressures social services worker John Sawyer into finding a facility that will take in Brownie, a violent and alcoholic vagrant who has been harassing local merchants. Using liquor to pacify Brownie, John picks her up and drops her off at Shady Palms. When Edith tries to confiscate Brownie's belongings, the woman attacks her, so Edith stabs her. The seemingly-dead Brownie is dumped in the garage, but she recovers. She knifes Gordon (leaving him confined to a bed for the rest of the film) before Edith finishes her off with a cleaver. While Edith treats Gordon's wounds, it is revealed that Gordon is only a veterinarian, and that Edith was kicked out of nursing school.

Sawyer sweet-talks Edith into admitting another deranged vagrant into Shady Palms, Polish immigrant Mischa Rudinski. Shortly after Mischa arrives, Charity Chandler arrives at Shady Palms to look into the disappearance of her twin sister Faith, Sawyer's predecessor, whom Edith murdered. After Charity leaves, Edith murders Mischa, having grown weary of listening to his incessant anti-socialist rants.

Suspicious of Shady Palms, Charity seeks aid from Sergeant Gallagher, but he simply tells her that he might question Edith if Faith does not reappear in a day or two. Taking matters into her own hands, Charity sneaks into Shady Palms and finds the bodies in the garage. After Edith stabs her to death, Sergeant Gallagher calls and makes an appointment to speak to Edith about Faith. Edith tries to cover up the smell of her and Gordon's victims with lime, but this backfires when the substance drives out into the street the rats that were feeding on the bodies, dragging pieces of human tissue with them. This prompts Sergeant Gallagher to get a warrant to scour Shady Palms. When Gallagher appears with the warrant, Edith slumps on a couch and wordlessly sulks as Gordon calls to her from his room.

== Cast ==
- Priscilla Alden as Nurse Edith Mortley
- Albert Eskinazi as Doctor Gordon Mortley
- Frances Millard as Charity Chandler/Faith Chandler
- Irmgard Millard as Brownie
- Nick Millard as Sergeant David Gallagher
- Fred Sarra as Lieutenant Cal Bedowski

== DVD release ==
Slasher // Video released Death Nurse 2 and its predecessor on DVD in 2012. Limited to 997 copies, the DVD contains features such as two commentaries, interviews, and a short film titled Brownie Goes Shopping.

== Reception ==
Trash Film Guru's Ryan C. stated, "This is quite likely the most blatant, no-bones-about-it, complete waste of time ever put together by anyone for any reason, yet it never manages to be outright boring even though any rational analysis dictates that it certainly should be". In a review for Video Junkie Strikes Back from Beyond the Grave, William S. Wilson referred to Death Nurse 2 as a heavily padded and hilariously inept "assault on the senses".

Justin McKinney of The Bloody Pit of Horror gave Death Nurse 2 a 1 out 4, and wrote, "Possibly behind only Jerry Warren, Millard may actually be one of horror cinema's thriftiest filmmakers, seeing as how he managed to slap together a half dozen 80s horror features using next to no money, a consumer grade camcorder, his friends and family as 'actors' and a bare minimum of new footage. Here, he again liberally recycles scenes from both Criminally Insane (1973) and Satan's Black Wedding (1974); passing them off as Edith's nightmares. Since this is a follow-up, he's also able to pad things out even further by including clips from the first Death Nurse to help push the run-time up to a paltry 60 minutes. Again, there's a new title card for the film, but the same credits from Criminally Insane are re-run. The music from that film is also reused. It's set in the same exact Pepto Bismol-colored San Francisco house the other movies are set in, features most of the same 'actors' from the other movies and features the same aluminum foil-covered weapons for the close-up hacking/stabbing scenes. There are countless zoom shots, many close-ups of Edith's scowling face and numerous scenes of people sitting, sleeping, lounging on a couch or walking through the house that never seem to end".
