= Nina Byron =

New Zealand-American actress (1900–1987)

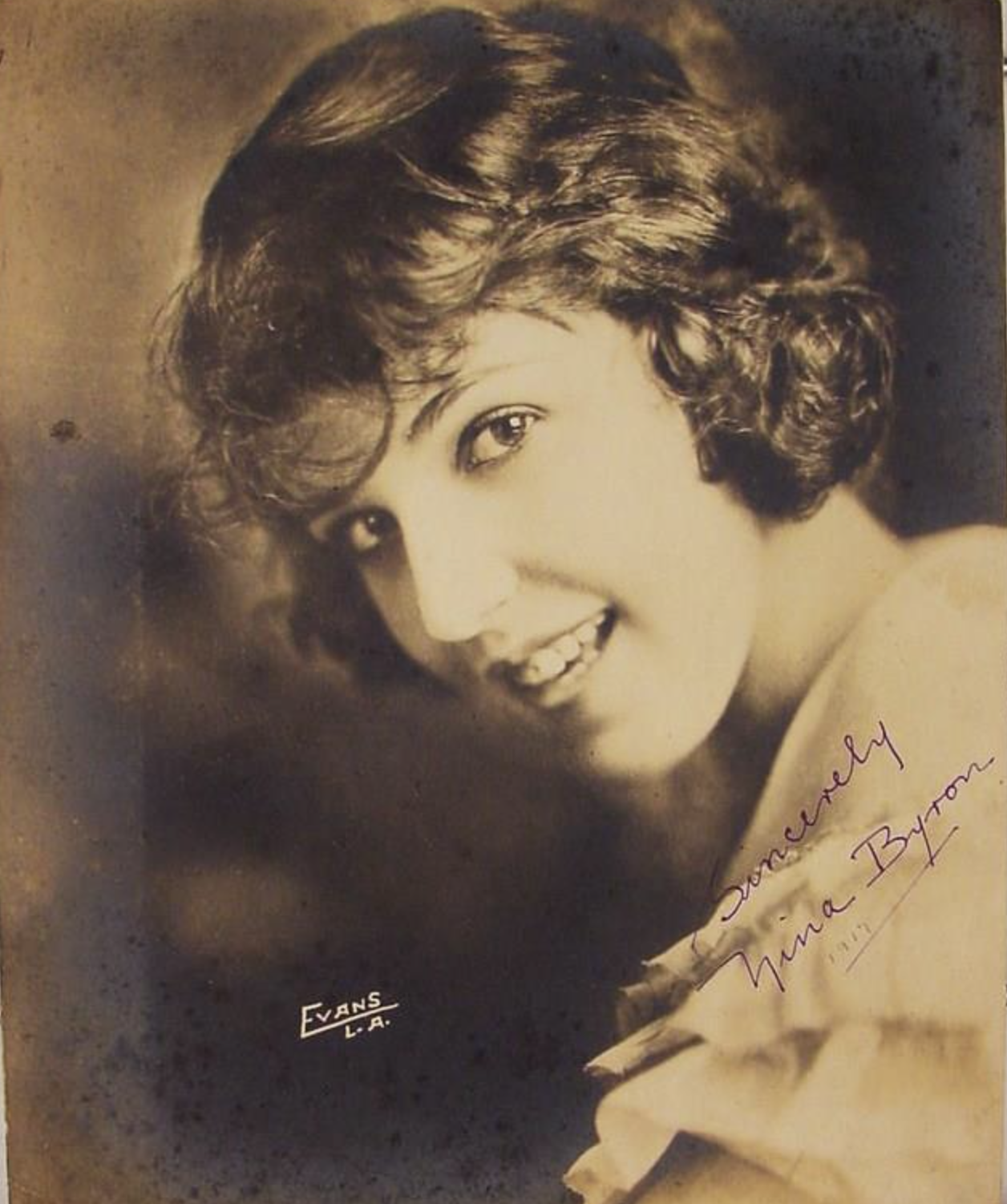
- Byron circa 1917
- Born: Nina Clarice Betts; July 27, 1900; Christchurch, New Zealand
- Died: January 21, 1987 (aged 86); Lynchburg, Virginia, U.S.
- Occupations: Actress; dancer; showgirl
- Spouses: Nicholas Dunaew (m. 1918; div. 1922) Harold Rosson (m. 1924; div. 1926) Frank Hotaling (m. 1939; died 1977)

Nina Byron (born Nina Clarice Betts; July 27, 1900 – January 21, 1987) was a New Zealand–American silent film actress and showgirl.

== Film actress ==
Byron was born Nina Clarice Betts in Christchurch, New Zealand, in 1900 to George Arthur Betts and his wife, Grace (Goodman) Betts. She traveled to the United States and made her first film with William S. Hart in the 1917 production Truthful Tulliver.

As Abby Hope in The Heir of the Ages (1917), Byron was described by a critic as having substantial acting skills. She was the ingenue (stock character) for House Peters. The material she was given to work with, according to the reviewer, did not test her ability. Her character was merely required to laugh like the silent film icon Mary Pickford. Her other film credits are for roles in The Cruise of the Make-Believes (1918), The Source (1918), The Dub (1919), Johnny Get Your Gun (1919), The Boomerang (1919), and her last film, The Broken Butterfly (1919).

== Broadway ==
Byron was a member of the Ziegfeld Follies during 1923 and 1924. She was also featured in the 1924 Broadway musical Paradise Alley.

== Personal life ==
Byron met her first husband, Nicholas Dunaew, in New York City. Dunaew, a Russian silent film actor, claimed to have met Byron in 1916 and brought her and her mother to Los Angeles, where the couple married in 1918. According to Dunaew, they separated in 1920 after she left him. Unhappy with Byron's "reprehensible conduct," Dunaew asked for a divorce, stating: "She has treated me even as her mother treated her father. She left him in New Zealand, and when she heard that he had committed suicide, she laughed; Nina also laughed—these women who had practically killed a man with cruelty laughed at his action in putting himself out of his misery."

Her second marriage was to cinematographer Harold Rosson in 1924. The two divorced in 1926, and she married set designer Frank Hotaling in 1939, to whom she remained married until his death.
