= Serial Metaphysics =

1972 collage film by Wheeler Winston Dixon

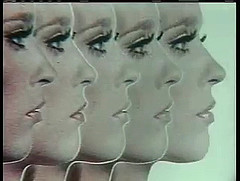
- A still from Wheeler Winston Dixon's film Serial Metaphysics
- Directed by: Wheeler Winston Dixon
- Release date: 1972
- Language: English

Serial Metaphysics is a 1972 collage film by experimental filmmaker Wheeler Winston Dixon.

== Summary ==
An examination of the American lifestyle recut entirely from existing television commercials creating "a vision of the world as viewed through the eyes of the corporate sponsor with a target audience in mind".

Ed Halter from The Village Voice stated that Wheeler's "loopy Americana remix grooves to an increasingly trippy reverb."

== Production ==
The film was edited down all in one night on New Year's Eve from 72 hours of TV commercials.

== Reception and legacy ==
The Whitney Museum of American Art showed the film (twice in 1973 and 1974) where then-curator Bruce Rubin commented that Wheeler "is a masterful film editor. His sensitivity to the movement within the frame and of the camera itself allows for fluidity in his editing that is exuberant and refreshing. It is as though his films tap into our collective unconscious by exploring the surface realities that permeate our lives."

== See also ==
- Criticism of capitalism
- A Corny Concerto - audio from the 1943 animated short can be heard in the film
- Gustav Holst's The Planets and Sergei Rachmaninoff's Piano Concerto No. 2 can also be heard in the film
