= Christine Lucy Latimer =

Canadian experimental filmmaker

Christine Lucy Latimer is a Canadian experimental filmmaker known for her hybrid works using obsolete media and technologies (16mm, home video, etc.).

== Background ==
Raised in the 1990s in a middle-class suburb of Toronto, Latimer was influenced by her artist mother and her father, who was an avid film and television enthusiast. She attributes her artistic approach to her early exposure to art, cinema, and television. Latimer studied at the Ontario College of Art and Design, where her instructors were moving-image artists who had been active in Toronto for decades and identified as either experimental filmmakers or video artists. Latimer opted to study both video and film, with the intention of layering and combining these mediums.

== Selected filmography ==
- Tender (2021)
- House Pieces (2019)
- C2013 (2014)
- Physics and Metaphysics in Modern Photography (2014)
- Nationtime (2013)
- Jane's Birthday (2013)
- Still Feeling Blue About Color Separation (2015)
- Lines Postfixal (2013)
- The Magik Iffektor (2012)
- The Pool (2011)
- Fruit Flies (2010)
- Focus (2009)
- Ghostmeat (2003)
- Program Description (2003)
- Mosaic (2002)

== See also ==
- Lost media
- Found footage
- Christina Battle - another female Canadian collage filmmaker similar in content
