= The Garden of Earthly Delights (1981 film) =

- A screenshot from The Garden of Earthly Delights, showing montane zone vegetation
- Directed by: Stan Brakhage
- Release date: 1981
- Running time: 2.5 minutes
- Country: United States
- Language: English

The Garden of Earthly Delights is an experimental short film by Stan Brakhage, released in 1981. The film was partly inspired by Hieronymus Bosch’s painting of the same name.

== Production ==
The Garden of Earthly Delights, like Brakhage's earlier Mothlight, is considered a "collage film." It was created without the use of a camera, by pasting montane zone vegetation, such as petals, grasses and leaves, onto strips of clear film leader. Brakhage intended the film as "an homage to (but also argument with) Hieronymous Bosch."

At the time I made The Garden [of Earthly Delights], I was very annoyed with Hieronymus Bosch’s painting of the same name, which envisions nature as puffy and sweet, while the humans are suffering these torments. After all, nature suffers as well. As a plant winds itself around, in its desperate reach for sunlight, it undergoes its own torments. We are not the only ones in the world.

Brakhage has also cited as inspiration J.E.H. MacDonald's The Tangled Garden, and the flower paintings of Emil Nolde.

The Garden of Earthly Delights was produced on 16mm film, and is intended to be screened at 18 frames per second; however, this is not possible for many 16mm projectors. The film runs for a total of 2,496 frames. Like Bosch's triptych, Brakhage's film is divided into three sections using alternating black and white leader backgrounds.

== Reception ==
The Garden of Earthly Delights is often viewed as a companion piece to Mothlight. Karli Lukas, writing for Senses of Cinema, described the film as "a brilliant illustration of Brakhage’s philosophies regarding the persistence and particularities (or peculiarities) of vision." Adrian Ivakhiv considers the film "a flickering kaleidoscope of visual intensity by which viewers are drawn in to the very act of seeing the light of projected 'nature.'" Film scholar Scott MacDonald was admiring of the film, remarking that the viewing experience "evokes a complex, multileveled set of implied comparisons between Brakhage's filmmaking and gardening."
