= The Broken Butterfly =

1919 film by Maurice Tourneur

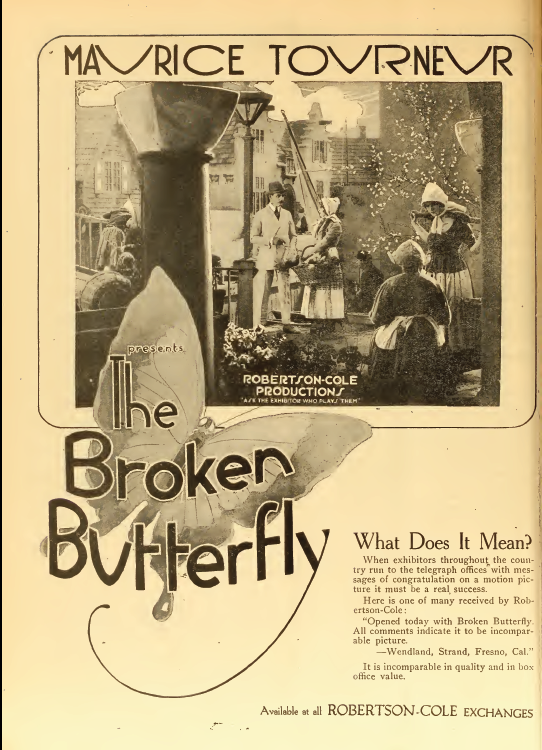
- Advertisement
- Directed by: Maurice Tourneur
- Written by: H. Tipton Steck; Maurice Tourneur; Charles E. Whittaker
- Based on: Marcene by Penelope Knapp
- Produced by: Maurice Tourneur
- Starring: Lew Cody; Mary Alden; Pauline Starke
- Production company: Maurice Tourneur Productions
- Distributed by: Robertson-Cole Distributing Corporation
- Release date: November 1, 1919
- Running time: 5 reels
- Country: United States
- Language: Silent (English intertitles)

The Broken Butterfly (1919) by Maurice Tourneur

The Broken Butterfly is a 1919 American silent drama film directed by Maurice Tourneur and starring Lew Cody, Mary Alden, and Pauline Starke.

== Plot ==
While strolling through the forests of Canada, Marcène Elliot, a naïve young woman meets Daniel Thorn, a composer looking for inspiration for a symphony. They are fascinated by each other and she abandons herself into her lover's arms. Daniel then writes a symphony and calls it “Marcène” after her. He then asks her to accompany him to "the old continent" for the first time, but she refuses, fearing the anger of her Aunt Julie Elliot.

Marcène gives birth to a little girl and then her aunt rejects her. Her own fears push her to attempt suicide. Upon returning, Daniel learns from Aunt Julie that Marcène gave birth to his child and that she drowned herself and her daughter. He then travels to forget his pain and meets Marcène's sister in England where she is playing his symphony. They get to know each other, finally fall in love and get married. Upon returning to Canada, they discover that Marcène and her daughter are still alive, but that Marcène lays dying in her bed. In agreement with his wife, they hide their marriage from Marcène. She dies happy and the couple adopts the little girl.

== Cast ==
- Lew Cody as Daniel Thorn
- Mary Alden as Julie Elliot
- Pauline Starke as Marcène Elliot
- Peaches Johnson (this is probably Peaches Jackson)
- Nina Byron

== Preservation status ==
A print of The Broken Butterfly is listed in the catalog of the French archive Centre national du cinéma et de l'image animée in Fort de Bois-d'Arcy.

== Bibliography ==
- Waldman, Harry. Maurice Tourneur: The Life and Films. McFarland, 2001.
