= The Heir of the Ages =

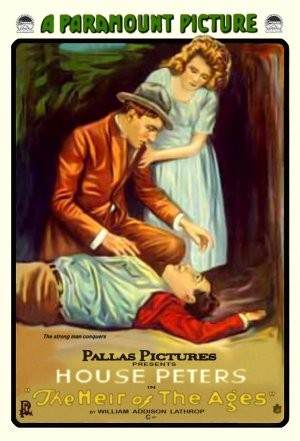
- Theatrical release poster
- Directed by: Edward LeSaint
- Screenplay by: William Addison Lathrop
- Starring: House Peters Sr. Eugene Pallette; Nina Byron; John Burton; Henry A. Barrows; Adele Farrington
- Cinematography: Allen M. Davey
- Production company: Pallas Pictures
- Distributed by: Paramount Pictures
- Release date: June 21, 1917
- Running time: 50 minutes
- Country: United States
- Language: Silent (English intertitles)

The Heir of the Ages is a 1917 American silent drama film directed by Edward LeSaint and written by William Addison Lathrop. The film stars House Peters Sr., Eugene Pallette, Nina Byron, John Burton, Henry A. Barrows and Adele Farrington. The film was released on June 21, 1917, by Paramount Pictures.

== Cast ==
- House Peters Sr. as Hugh Payne
- Eugene Pallette as Larry Payne
- Nina Byron as Abby Hope
- John Burton as Mr. Hope
- Henry A. Barrows as Kearney
- Adele Farrington as The Duchess
