= Nina Barr Wheeler =

American painter

- Nina Barr Wheeler in 1964. Photo: Wheeler Winston Dixon
- Born: September 3, 1909
- Died: May 1, 1978 (aged 68)
- Known for: Painting Stained Glass Murals

Nina Barr Wheeler (September 3, 1909 – May 1, 1978) was an American artist. She worked with Hildreth Meiere on many of her murals, and also was a painter of Catholic religious art. She studied painting at the Art Students League of New York, and the American School in Fontainebleau, France. She painted two murals for the 1940 World's Fair in New York, and was a member of the Architectural League of New York and the National Society of Mural Painters. She designed stained glass windows for the National Cathedral in Washington, DC and murals for the interior of The Tavern on the Green restaurant in New York City. She was most active during the Depression and World War II, and designed many religious triptychs, which were used as portable altars for the armed forces. One of her works can be found in the Smithsonian American Art Museum.

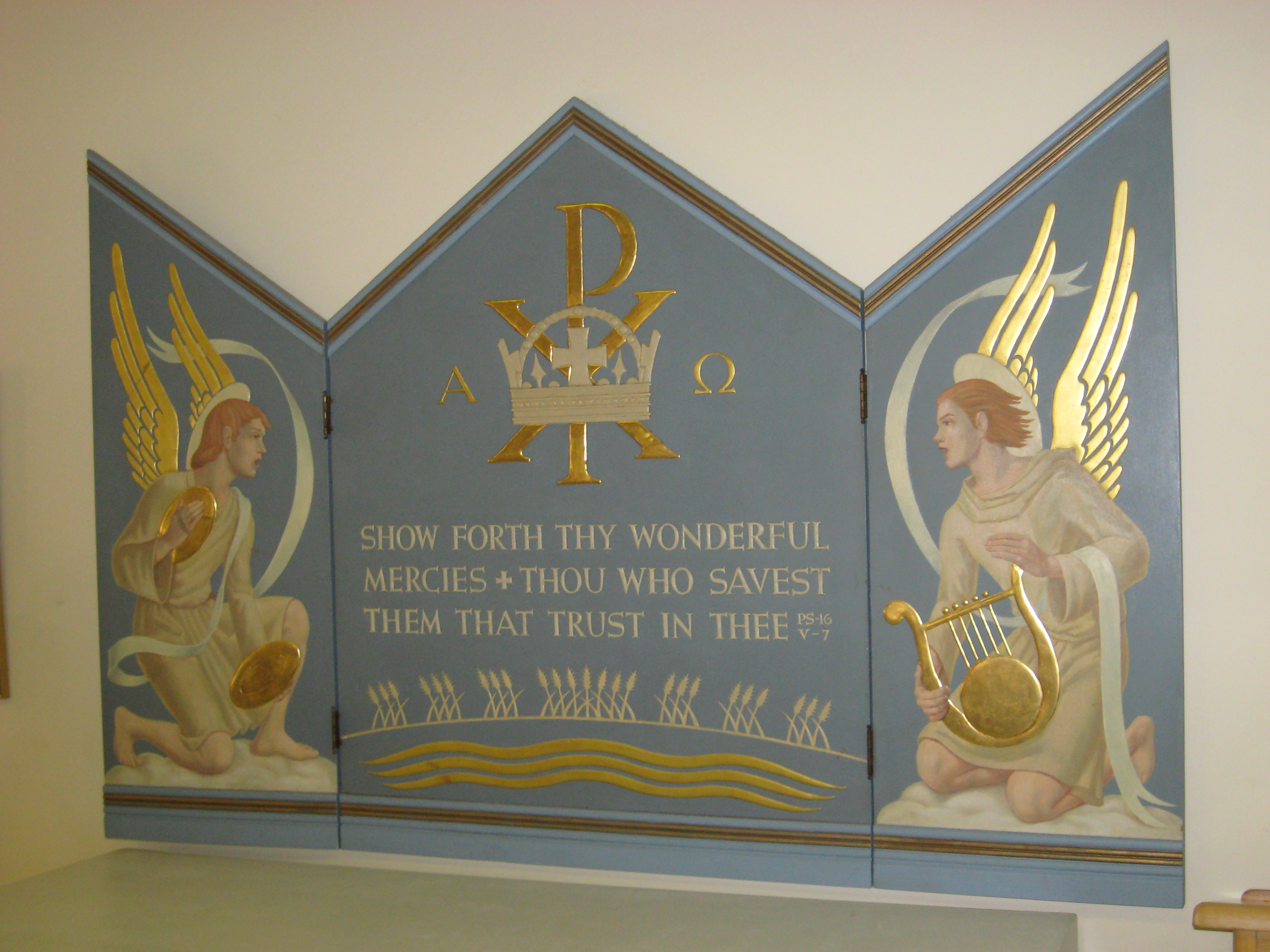
A religious triptych by Nina Barr Wheeler in the collection of Christ Church, Shrewsbury, New Jersey.

In the 1950s and 60s, she taught in the Art Department at Manhattanville College under her married name of Nina Blake. She was married to Hugh Hastings Blake (1903-1970). Moving from Manhattan, she purchased a building site in Newtown, CT in the late 1940s, where she built her own house on 8 acres (32,000 m^{2}) of land, which she named "Topside," and designed maps for the city of Newtown, and was active in social and political affairs in the community. She died in May, 1978. Her nephew is the writer and filmmaker Wheeler Winston Dixon.
