= Johnny Get Your Gun =

1919 film by Donald Crisp

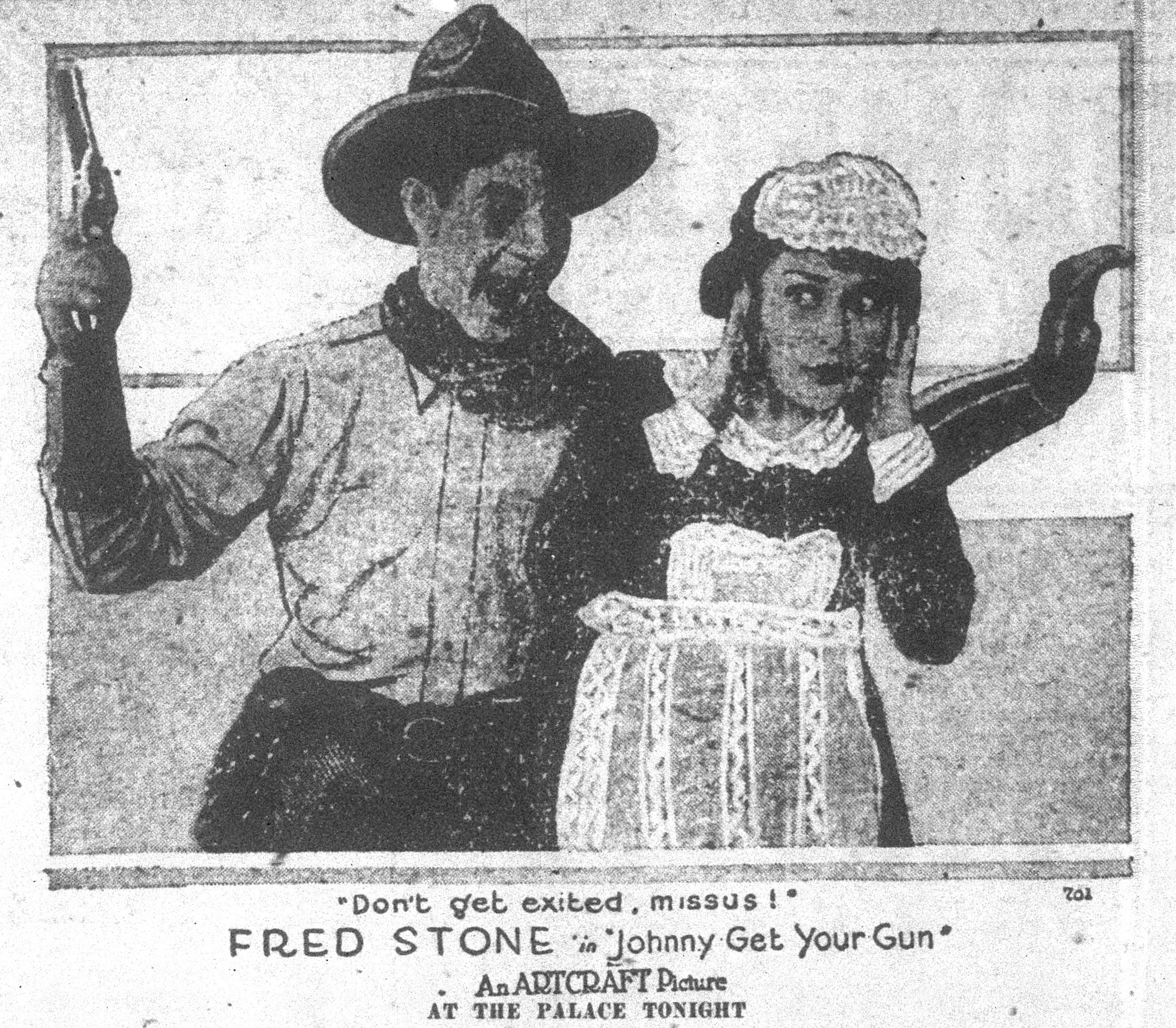
- Contemporary newspaper publicity photo
- Directed by: Donald Crisp
- Screenplay by: Edmund Lawrence Burke; Gardner Hunting
- Produced by: Jesse L. Lasky
- Starring: Fred Stone; Mary Anderson; Casson Ferguson; James Cruze; Sylvia Ashton; Nina Byron; Mayme Kelso
- Cinematography: Henry Kotani
- Production companies: Artcraft Pictures Corporation; Famous Players–Lasky Corporation
- Distributed by: Paramount Pictures
- Release date: March 16, 1919
- Running time: 50 minutes
- Country: United States
- Language: English

Johnny Get Your Gun is a 1919 American comedy silent film directed by Donald Crisp and written by Edmund Lawrence Burke and Gardner Hunting. The film stars Fred Stone, Mary Anderson, Casson Ferguson, James Cruze, Sylvia Ashton, Nina Byron and Mayme Kelso. The film was released on March 16, 1919, by Paramount Pictures.

== Cast ==
- Fred Stone as Johnny Wiggins
- Mary Anderson as Ruth Gordon
- Casson Ferguson as Bert Whitney
- James Cruze as The Duke of Bullconia
- Sylvia Ashton as Aunt Agatha
- Nina Byron as Janet Burnham
- Mayme Kelso as Mrs. Tupper
- Raymond Hatton as Garry
- Jack Hoxie as Bill Burnham
- Dan Crimmins as Pollitt
- Fred Huntley as Jevne
- Ernest Joy as Lawyer Cotter
- Noah Beery, Sr. as Town Marshal
- Clarence Geldart as Director

== Preservation status ==
- A print survives at UCLA Film and Television Archive.
