= The Dub =

1919 film by James Cruze

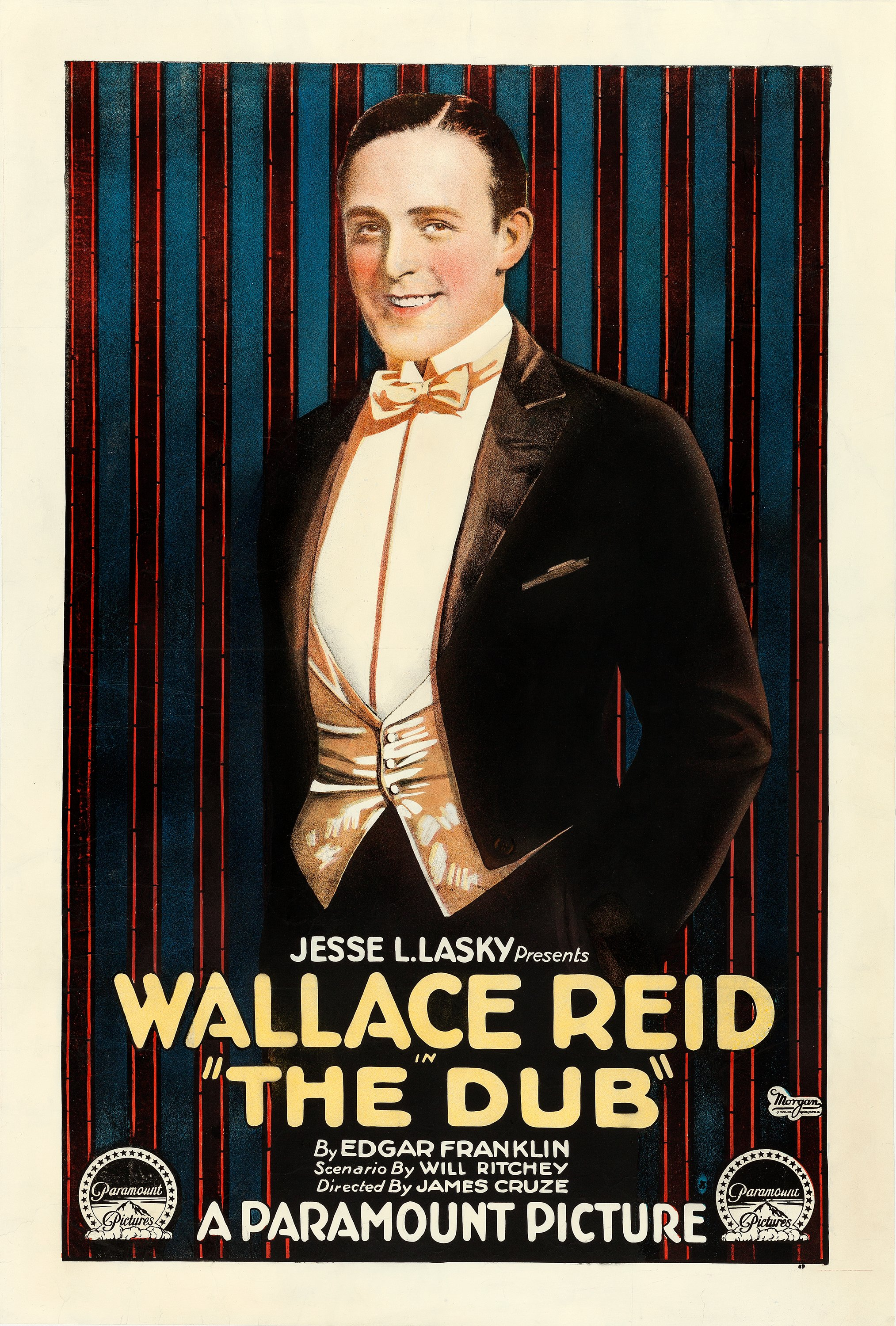
- Film poster
- Directed by: James Cruze
- Screenplay by: Edgar Franklin; Will M. Ritchey
- Produced by: Jesse L. Lasky
- Starring: Wallace Reid; Charles Ogle; Ralph Lewis; Raymond Hatton; Winter Hall; Nina Byron
- Cinematography: Charles Rosher
- Production companies: Famous Players–Lasky Corporation; Jesse L. Lasky Feature Play Company
- Distributed by: Paramount Pictures
- Release date: January 19, 1919
- Running time: 50 minutes
- Country: United States
- Language: Silent (English intertitles)

The Dub is a lost 1919 American silent comedy film directed by James Cruze and written by Edgar Franklin and Will M. Ritchey. The film stars Wallace Reid, Charles Ogle, Ralph Lewis, Raymond Hatton, Winter Hall, and Nina Byron. The film was released on January 19, 1919, by Paramount Pictures.

== Plot ==
When the brokerage firm of Blatch, Markham and Driggs dissolves, Markham steals company records and the option of a valuable mine. Meanwhile, Blatch, who wants the option to expire, so he can then purchase it at a low price, hires attorney Burley Hadden to convince Driggs that he is trying to recover it. Hadden sees John Craig, a bungling construction contractor who needs $800 for his payroll, running nervously from the pop of a paper bag, and offers the supposed "dub" $1,000 to retrieve the papers, thinking he will fail. After Markham tries to dupe John, he meets Enid Drayton, Markham's ward, who is being held a virtual prisoner in Markham's mansion. With the help of a friendly burglar, they retrieve the option and other papers which prove that Markham and Blatch had been cheating Driggs for years. After Driggs rewards John and informs Enid that she owns a million dollar estate, she and John embrace.

== Cast ==
- Wallace Reid as John Craig
- Charles Ogle as George Markham
- Ralph Lewis as Frederick Blatch
- Raymond Hatton as Phineas Driggs
- Winter Hall as Burley Hadden
- Nina Byron as Enid Drayton
- Guy Oliver as Robbins
- Harry O'Connor as James
- William Elmer as Burglar Bill
- Clarence Geldart as Craig's Clerk

== See also ==
- Wallace Reid filmography
