= Splatter University =

- Theatrical release poster
- Directed by: Richard W. Haines
- Screenplay by: Michael Cunningham; Richard W. Haines; John Elias Michalakis (as John Michaels)
- Story by: Michael Cunningham; Richard W. Haines; John Elias Michalakis (as John Michaels)
- Produced by: Richard W. Haines; John Michaels
- Starring: Forbes Riley (as Francine Forbes); Ric Randig; Dick Biel; Kathy LaCommare (as Kathy Lacommare); Laura Gold
- Cinematography: Jim Grib
- Edited by: Richard W. Haines
- Music by: Christopher Burke (as Chris Burke)
- Production company: Aquafilm
- Distributed by: Troma Entertainment
- Release date: April 20, 1984 (Myrtle Beach, South Carolina)
- Running time: 78 minutes
- Country: United States
- Language: English
- Budget: $50,000

Splatter University is a 1984 American slasher film directed by Richard W. Haines and written by Haines alongside Michael Cunningham and John Elias Michalakis. It was distributed by Troma Entertainment.

== Plot ==
In 1981, Daniel Grayham, a man with paranoid schizophrenia, escapes from a mental asylum after killing a doctor and stealing his uniform. Three years later, a sociology teacher at St. Trinian's College is murdered whilst working alone in a classroom, and a new teacher, Julie Parker, is hired by the school's handicapped priest headmaster Father Janson to take her place the following semester.

During her first few weeks at St Trinian's, Julie befriends fellow teachers Cynthia and Mark, the latter of whom she develops a romantic relationship with. Meanwhile, two female students of Julie's are murdered by an unseen, knife-wielding killer — one in a local parking lot, the other at a drive-in movie. Cynthia phones up Julie in the middle of the night to discuss the recent murders and her suspicions of Mark. With the assistance of Cynthia, Julie decides to investigate Mark's apartment while he is out, where she finds both a pocket knife and various newspaper articles on murders occurring in the surrounding area. Mark suddenly returns to the apartment, forcing Julie to flee.

The next day, Cynthia's mutilated corpse is found in a storage room within the college, causing it to be closed early for the day. Julie, deeply upset by the incident, tells Father Janson that she is quitting her job and spends the rest of the day packing her belongings to prepare for leaving town tomorrow. Around the same time, several more students and a teacher are murdered. Julie then calls Father Janson, convinced Mark is the killer, and begs him to meet her at St Trinian's later that night. Mark suddenly appears, prompting Julie to attack him and flee, then speed off to the college.

As she confides in Father Janson about her misgivings, he clarifies that he is not handicapped, that he is Daniel Grayham and has been the murderer all along, his motives having been driven in part by misogyny and religious zealotry. Drawing a knife from his crucifix, Julie turns the knife on him and then runs away. Mark arrives on campus after trailing Julie, but struggles to get inside. Julie hides in the bathroom, but screams and runs out upon stumbling across the bloody remains of a teacher in one of the stalls. She then takes an elevator, but Janson catches up and kills Julie by slicing open her back.

Mark gets inside and discovers Julie's body. Cleaning off any remains, Janson then calls the police in an attempt to frame Mark for the murder, but Mark bursts in and notices a bloody knife sheath disguised as a crucifix on the wall of Janson's office. With his plans foiled, Janson is taken away to an insane asylum, where he is placed in a straitjacket.

== Cast ==
- Forbes Riley (as Francine Forbes) as Julie Parker
- Ric Randig as Mark Hammond
- Dick Biel as Father Janson / Daniel Grayham
- Laura Gold as Cynthia Lockey

== Production ==
The original version of the movie was shot in 1981, and it clocked in at around 65 minutes. 13 minutes of additional scenes with students were filmed the next year to increase the running time.

The filmmakers were originally told they would have two weeks to shoot at Mercy College, but the school cut their time by a week, so many members of the crew wound up sleeping in the classrooms to ensure the film was finished. When students returned to school, they were alarmed to find crew members cleaning up fake blood.

== Critical reception ==
AllMovie criticized the film for its "bone-headed plotting" and "half-hearted execution". In its review, Horror DNA said the film is "pretty forgettable except for a surprise twist ending that still holds up well today".

The website Really Awful Movies also found the film "very weak".
