= Decasia =

- Region 1 DVD
- Directed by: Bill Morrison
- Written by: Bill Morrison
- Produced by: Bill Morrison; Europäischer Musikmonat; Daniel Zippi
- Edited by: Bill Morrison
- Music by: Michael Gordon
- Distributed by: Icarus Films
- Release date: January 2002
- Running time: 67 minutes
- Country: United States
- Language: Silent

Decasia is a 2002 American collage film by Bill Morrison, featuring an original score by Michael Gordon. In 2013, Decasia was included in the annual selection of 25 motion pictures chosen for preservation in the United States National Film Registry by the Library of Congress as being "culturally, historically, or aesthetically significant".

== Summary ==
The film is a meditation on old, decaying silent films, featuring segments of earlier movies re-edited and integrated into a new narrative. Critic Glen Kenny described Decasia as an "abstract narrative about mortality in all of its manifestations."

It begins and ends with scenes of a dervish and is bookended with old footage showing how film is processed. Nothing was done to accelerate the decomposition of the actual film prints, some of which were copied from the University of South Carolina's Moving Image Research Collections as well as deteriorating film footage that Morrison found at the Library of Congress.

The film's musical soundtrack features several detuned pianos and an orchestra playing out of phase with itself, adding to the fractured and decomposing nature of the film.

Various films that were incorporated into Decasia have been positively identified: J. Farrell MacDonald's The Last Egyptian (1914), written, produced, and based on the novel by L. Frank Baum; William S. Hart's Truthful Tulliver (1917); Norman Dawn's A Tokyo Siren (1920); John H. Collins's The Man Who Could Not Sleep (1915); Eddie Lyons's Peace and Quiet (1921) and Phillips Smalley's The Mind Cure (1912). Various Fox Movietone newsreel footage were also used.

== Legacy ==
In 2013, Decasia was selected for preservation by the National Film Registry. It was the first film from the 21st century to be selected. Decasia was included in the September 2014 box set release of Bill Morrison's collected works, from Icarus Films.
