= America, Lost and Found =

1979 documentary by Lance Bird and Tom Johnson

America, Lost and Found is a 1979 documentary film essay directed by Lance Bird and Tom Johnson.

== Summary ==
Made entirely out of newsreels and archival footage, the film summarizes the history of America from the Great Depression to the start of WWII (including the Hindenburg disaster).

=== People featured in the film ===
- Thomas Edison
- Henry Ford
- Huey Long
- Herbert Hoover
- Eleanor Roosevelt
- Franklin D. Roosevelt
- Al Jolson
- Jimmy Durante
- H.G. Wells
- Orson Welles
- Philo Farnsworth
- Howard Hughes

== Cast ==
- Pat Hingle - narrator

== See also ==
- Brother, Can You Spare a Dime? - the 1975 documentary similar in content and structure
- The World of Tomorrow - the 1984 documentary about the 1939 World's Fair
- Stand Up and Cheer! - 1934 film musical featured in the documentary
