= Mothlight =

- A still from Mothlight, showing the wing of an insect
- Directed by: Stan Brakhage
- Release date: 1963
- Running time: 4 minutes
- Country: United States
- Language: Silent

Mothlight is an experimental short film by Stan Brakhage, released in 1963. The film was created without the use of a camera.

== Description ==
Mothlight is a silent "collage film" that incorporates "real world elements." Brakhage produced the film without the use of a camera, using what he then described as "a whole new film technique." Brakhage collected moth wings, flower petals, and blades of grass, and pressed them between two strips of 16mm splicing tape. The resulting assemblage was then contact-printed at a lab to allow projection in a cinema. The objects chosen were required to be thin and translucent, to permit the passage of light. Brakhage reused the technique to produce his later film The Garden of Earthly Delights (1981). Mothlight has been described as boasting a "three-part musical structure."

== Production ==
Brakhage was initially drawn to the idea of using moths in a film when he noticed many of them burning to death in a candle:

Here is a film that I made out of a deep grief. The grief is my business in a way, but the grief was helpful in squeezing the little film out of me, that I said "these crazy moths are flying into the candlelight, and burning themselves to death, and that's what's happening to me. I don't have enough money to make these films, and ... I'm not feeding my children properly, because of these damn films, you know. And I'm burning up here ... What can I do?" I'm feeling the full horror of some kind of immolation, in a way."

After spending some time following live moths with a camera, an exercise that proved fruitless, Brakhage instead turned his attention towards using dead moths:

"Over the lightbulbs there's all these dead moth wings, and I ... hate that. Such a sadness; there must surely be something to do with that. I tenderly picked them out and start pasting them onto a strip of film, to try to ... give them life again, to animate them again, to try to put them into some sort of life through the motion picture machine."

== Reception ==
Mothlight won awards at the 1964 Brussels International Film Festival, and the 1966 Spoleto Film Festival. James Peterson describes Mothlight as belonging "to a new class of films, those that direct attention away from the screen and to the physical object in the projector." Darragh O'Donoghue, writing for Senses of Cinema, praised the way Brakhage "evokes the moth not through cartoon mimicry, but by the fragile sensation of its movement, batting against the screen, hurtling in descent."

Along with Window Water Baby Moving (1959), Mothlight remains one of Brakhage's best-known works, and his most rented. It was released on DVD and Blu-ray as part of the Criterion Collection's By Brakhage: An Anthology.

== See also ==
- List of American films of 1963
