= Trailer War =

American collage film

Trailer War is a 2012 compilation film featuring rare vintage 35mm film trailers created by Drafthouse Films in partnership with director Joe Dante (who started out cutting trailers for B-movie producer Roger Corman) and American Genre Film Archive.

== Summary ==
A meticulous two-hour collection of theatrical coming attraction trailers, including ones from the exploitation cinemas of the 1960s, 1970s and 1980s, curated by Drafthouse programmers Lars Nilsen and Zack Carlson (the latter responsible for saving the 1987 cult classic Miami Connection from obscurity) under the guidance of Dante.

== List of notable films featured ==
- Con El Odio En La Piel
- Amazing Grace
- Thunder Cops
- Penitentiary
- Inframan
- The Man from Hong Kong
- Stunt Rock
- Starcrash
- Animal Protector
- Dead End Drive-In
- H.O.T.S.
- Partners
- The Beach Girls
- The Mad Adventures of Rabbi Jacob
- Mitchell
- The Lawyer
- Big Guns
- Who Saw Her Die?
- Shoot
- Don't Answer the Phone
- Voyage of the Rock Aliens
- Maniac Cop 2
- Amuck!

== See also ==
- Mystery Science Theater 3000
- RiffTrax
- The Movie Orgy
