= Incident (2023 film) =

2023 documentary short film by Bill Morrison

- Directed by: Bill Morrison
- Produced by: Bill Morrison; Jamie Kalven
- Edited by: Bill Morrison
- Production companies: Hypnotic Pictures; Invisible Institute
- Distributed by: The New Yorker Studios
- Release dates: April 25, 2023 (Visions du Réel); August 28, 2024 (The New Yorker)
- Running time: 30 minutes
- Country: United States
- Language: English

Incident is a 2023 American documentary short film directed and edited by Bill Morrison.

== Synopsis ==
The film explores the 2018 killing of Harith "Snoop" Augustus by Chicago police officer Dillan Halley via montages of bodycam and surveillance footage.

== Reception ==
=== Critical response ===
Collin Souter of RogerEbert.com praised the film as a thorough, investigative work—one that "should be more common in the media landscape."

=== Accolades ===
Incident has been selected for numerous film festivals, and was nominated for Best Documentary Short Film at the 97th Academy Awards.

== See also ==
- LA 92
- June 17th, 1994
- Police brutality
