= Death Nurse =

- DVD released by Slasher // Video
- Directed by: Nick Millard
- Written by: Nick Millard
- Produced by: Irmgard Millard
- Starring: Nick Millard; Priscilla Alden; Albert Eskinazi; Irmgard Millard; Frances Millard
- Production company: I.R.M.I. Films Corporation
- Distributed by: Slasher // Video
- Release date: 1987 (United States)
- Running time: 57 minutes
- Country: United States
- Language: English

Death Nurse is a 1987 slasher film written and directed by Nick Millard. It was followed by a 1988 sequel entitled Death Nurse 2.

== Plot ==
From their suburban home, Doctor Gordon Mortley and his sister Nurse Edith run Shady Palms Clinic, a facility that takes in physically- or mentally-ill indigents sent to them by the county. In reality, the Mortleys are con artists who murder their patients, usually during "surgeries" performed on them by Gordon, and continue to bill the state for their care afterward. The only permanent resident of the clinic is the alcoholic Louise Kagel. One day, social services worker Faith Chandler drops off John Davis, a man afflicted with tuberculosis. Edith smothers John and Gordon buries his body, though he is later forced to dig it up and crudely puppeteer it to create the illusion that Davis is still alive when Faith asks to check in on him after bringing Charles Bedowski, who has a heart condition, to Shady Palms.

After Faith's visit, Edith and Gordon kill Bedowski while attempting to replace his heart with a dead dog's. The procedure is interrupted by the Mortley family cat, who grabs the heart. Gordon and Edith chase the cat and deem the transplant a failure. Gordon buries Bedowski's remains, and Edith feeds pieces of him to the rats that live in the garage. The infestation of vermin does not go unnoticed by the authorities, and when Mr. Smith, an environmental health officer, threatens to shut down the clinic, Edith stabs him to death.

Faith herself checks into Shady Palms and grows suspicious of the facility, which causes Edith to knife her after feeding her cooked rats for lunch. Louise witnesses Faith's murder, so Edith kills her with a syringe despite Gordon's fondness for her. Edith has Gordon place the bodies of Smith, Faith, and Louise in the garage, from which their smell attracts the attention of a police lieutenant who had stopped by to visit Charles Bedowski. Observing from a window as the lieutenant opens the garage and discovers what is inside it, a dejected Edith sits on a sofa with Gordon, and the film ends.

== Cast ==
- Priscilla Alden as Nurse Edith Mortley
- Albert Eskinazi as Doctor Gordon Mortley
- Royal Farros as Mr. Powell/Charles Bedowski
- Frances Millard as Faith Chandler
- Irmgard Millard as Louise Kagel
- Nick Millard as John Davis
- Fred Sarra as Lieutenant Cal Bedowski

== DVD release ==
Slasher // Video released Death Nurse and its sequel on DVD in 2012. Limited to 1000 copies, the DVD includes features such as a Q&A with Nick Millard, and a commentary provided by him, Irmgard Millard, and Slasher // Video founder Jesus Terán.

== Reception ==
Rock! Shock! Pop!'s Ian Jane called the film "fascinatingly watchable" despite its horribleness, and wrote, "The acting is amateur hour in the best/worst way possible but say what you will, the movie is something. Exactly what, it's hard to say but as far as slashers go, this one ranks down there with the cheapest of the cheap, the worst of the worse. As such, it's easy to love if you're in the right frame of mind for it. You'd be foolish to take any of it seriously, it's obvious that those making the picture weren't". Slasherpool gave Death Nurse a 2 out of 5, finding some entertainment in Priscilla Alden's performance, the death scenes, and the film's ineptness and absurdity, concluding "The premise isn't a bad one... in fact, in more capable hands, this would make a pretty good black comedy... but you get what you get".
