= Gwendolyn Audrey Foster =

American scholar and filmmaker

- Born: 1960 (age 65–66); United States
- Education: Rutgers University (B.A. English, 1983); University of Nebraska–Lincoln (M.A., 1992; Ph.D., 1995); Douglass College
- Occupations: Scholar, filmmaker
- Known for: Women Who Made the Movies
- Partner: Wheeler Winston Dixon
- Awards: 1998 AAUW Emerging Scholar; 2004 College of Arts & Sciences Distinguished Teaching Award, University of Nebraska–Lincoln

Gwendolyn Audrey Foster is an experimental filmmaker, artist and author. She is Willa Cather Professor Emerita in Film Studies. Her work has focused on gender, race, ecofeminism, queer sexuality, eco-theory, and class studies. From 1999 through the end of 2014, she was co-editor along with Wheeler Winston Dixon of the Quarterly Review of Film and Video. In 2016, she was named Willa Cather Endowed Professor of English at the University of Nebraska–Lincoln and took early retirement in 2020.

== Education ==
Foster received a B.A. Degree in English from Douglass College, Rutgers University in 1983, and earned a master's degree in 1992 and her doctorate (in English) at the University of Nebraska–Lincoln, in 1995.

== Career ==
Foster taught a broad variety of courses that reflect her diverse interests: Experimental Filmmakers, Queer theory and LGBTQ+ film, Apoco-tainment, Eco-Horror and Environmentalism in TV and Film, Italian Postwar Cinema, Challenging, Difficult and Disruptive Films, Spectators as co-authors, Women Filmmakers in Film History, the films of Luis Buñuel, Chantal Akerman, Lucrecia Martel, and Kelly Reichardt, Gender and Film Censorship, Feminist and Marxist Approaches to Film, "Woman's Pictures" and Melodrama, Female Spectatorship, Queer Spectatorship, Race & Post/colonialism in Film, Social Class and Social Mobility in Film, Moms, Maids, & Sex Workers – Redefining Female Heroes in Film, Masculinity in Media, Ozu, Bresson and Dreyer, Japanese and Asian Cinema, Latin American cinema, French Film Directors, Atomic anti-communist hysteria films, screenwriting, and many other courses.

She has written about film-related topics such as eco-feminism, underground film, avant garde film, cultural studies, feminist and Marxist critical theory, and women directors. Foster has made films including the 1991 documentary Women Who Made the Movies as well as the 1994 feature film Squatters, and more recently, a number of short films including the Gaia Triptych (2016) a series of short eco-horror and eco-feminist experimental films including Waste, Not, and Want Not. Foster's other short films include such Earth TV, Echo and Narcissus, Tenderness, Eros and Psyche, Pre-Raphaelite Falls, The Passenger, Pop. 1280 For Jim Thompson, Mirror, Amphitrite, and many other titles. Foster publishes in many journals such as Choice, Senses of Cinema, Film International, and Quarterly Review of Film and Video. She writes and publishes extensively on film studies and cultural studies, along with her filmmaking and installation art projects.

Foster and Wheeler Winston Dixon are coauthors of the popular film history textbook, A Short History of Film. They are Series Editors of "Quick Takes: Movies and Popular Culture," a series of books offering fresh perspectives on film and popular culture published by Rutgers University Press; and "New Perspectives on World Cinema Series" a collection of monographs on global studies in international cinema published by Anthem in the UK.

Her films have been screened at Outfest LA, Bi+ Arts Festival, The Nederlands Filmmuseum, Rice Museum, Collective for Living Cinema, Swedish Cinemateket, National Museum of Women in the Arts, DC, International Film Festival of Kerala, India, Films de Femmes, Créteil, Women's Film Festival of Madrid, Kyobo Center, Korea, Santa Barbara Museum of Art, Metropolitan Museum of Art, Université Laval, Quebec, Forum Yokohama, Anthology Film Archives, Amos Eno Gallery, NY, SLA 307 Art Space, NY, Maryland Institute College of Art, NETV, Studio 44 Stockholm, X-12 Festival, UK, and other museums and festivals around the world.

In March and April 2018, the BWA Contemporary Art Gallery in Katowice, Poland, presented a month long retrospective of Foster's new video work. In May 2018, she presented a screening of her videos, along with the work of Bill Domonkos and Wheeler Winston Dixon at The Museum of Human Achievement in Austin, Texas. In the summer of 2018, she had a one woman show at Filmhuis Cavia in Amsterdam, and her film Self Portrait [Détournement] was screened as part of NewFilmmakers at Anthology Film Archives on September 11, 2018. Her one woman show, Queer Experimental Films was screened July/August 2018 on Salto Netherlands International TV, and she had a one woman show at The Museum of The Future in Berlin, Germany on October 28, 2017. In October 2025, the fourth edition of her book A Short History of Film, co-written with Wheeler Winston Dixon, was published by Rutgers University Press.

== Personal life ==
Foster's life partner is Wheeler Winston Dixon.

== Books ==
- Disruptive Feminisms: Raced, Gendered, and Classed Bodies in Film (Palgrave Pivot, 2016)
- Hoarders, Doomsday Preppers, and the Culture of Apocalypse (Palgrave Pivot, 2014)
- 21st Century Hollywood: Movies in the Era of Transformation, co-written with Wheeler Winston Dixon, Rutgers University Press, 2011
- A Short History of Film, co-written with Wheeler Winston Dixon (Rutgers, 2008), 2nd edition 2013, 3rd Edition, 2018, 4th Edition, 2025.
- Class-Passing: Performing Social Mobility in Film and Popular Culture (Southern Illinois, 2005)
- Performing Whiteness: Postmodern Re/Constructions (SUNY, 2003)
- Experimental Cinema: the Film Reader, co-edited with Wheeler Winston Dixon, London: Routledge, 2002
- Troping the Body: Etiquette, Conduct and Dialogic Performance (Southern Illinois University Press, 2000)
- Captive Bodies: Postcolonialism in the Cinema (State University of New York Press, 1999)
- Women Filmmakers of the African and Asian Diaspora: Decolonizing the Gaze, Locating Subjectivity" (Southern Illinois University Press, 1997)
- Women Film Directors: An International Bio-Critical Dictionary. Westport: Greenwood Press, 1995
- Identity and Memory: The Films of Chantal Akerman (Southern Illinois UP, 2003)

== Filmography ==
Year	Title	Director	Writer	Producer	Notes
1992	Women Who Made the Movies	Yes	Yes		Co-directed with Wheeler Winston Dixon.
