= Stephen Broomer =

Canadian filmmaker

Stephen Broomer (born 1984) is a Canadian experimental filmmaker, film scholar and video essayist. He is the founder of the home video label Black Zero, specializing in rare Canadian experimental films, and is also the host of the acclaimed video essay series Art & Trash (alongside Northern Light and Detours) since 2021.

== Bibliography ==
- Hamilton Babylon: A History of the McMaster Film Board (Toronto: University of Toronto Press, 2016)
- Codes for North: the foundations of the Canadian avant-garde film (Toronto: Canadian Filmmakers Distribution Centre, 2017)
- Secret Museums: The Films of Arthur Lipsett (WLU Press, 2025)

== Selected filmography ==
- Christ Church - Saint James (2011)
- Conservatory (2013)
- Pepper's Ghost (2013)
- Potamkin (2017)
- Tondal's Vision (2018)
- Phantom Ride (2019)
- Resurrection of the Body (2019)
- Lulu Faustine (2020)
- Fat Chance (2021)

== See also ==
- Psychotronic film
- Collage film
- Cinema of Canada
- Cult film
- Pauline Kael - title of the series named after her essay Art, Trash and the Movies
- Film noir
- Cinephilia
