= The World of Tomorrow (film) =

1984 documentary film by Lance Bird and Tom Johnson

The World of Tomorrow is a 1984 American documentary film by Lance Bird and Tom Johnson, with a screenplay by John Crowley.

== Summary ==
A nostalgic look at pre-WWII America and the 1939 World's Fair through black-and-white newsreels and industrial films, but mostly from Kodachrome color home movies.

== Cast ==
- Jason Robards Jr. - Narrator

== Production ==
Produced by WNET with a budget of $298,155, it first was released to theaters for Academy Award consideration and later broadcast on PBS the next year.

== Accolades ==
- 1985 Sundance Film Festival: Grand Jury Prize Documentary (nominated)

== See also ==
- America, Lost and Found - 1979 documentary also by Bird and Johnson focusing on the Great Depression
- List of American independent films
