= Wheeler Winston Dixon =

American filmmaker and scholar (born 1950)

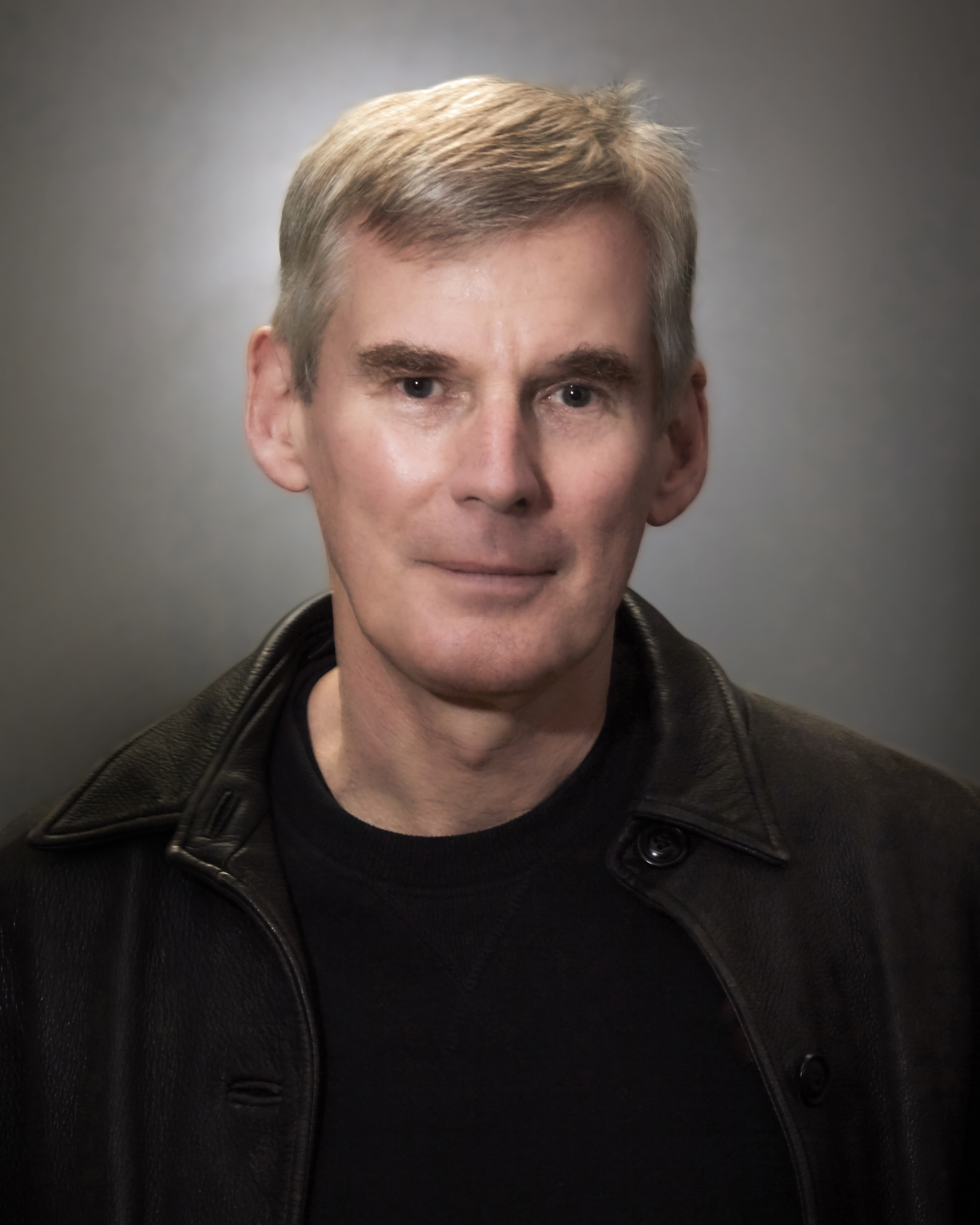
- Wheeler Winston Dixon in 2016
- Born: March 12, 1950 (age 76); New Brunswick, New Jersey, U.S.
- Education: Rutgers University (BA, PhD)
- Occupations: Film critic, film historian, filmmaker, scholar
- Notable work: A Short History of Film, A History of Horror; Experimental films
- Partner: Gwendolyn Audrey Foster

Wheeler Winston Dixon (born March 12, 1950) is an American filmmaker and scholar. His scholarship has particular emphasis on François Truffaut, Jean-Luc Godard, American experimental cinema and horror films. He has written extensively on numerous aspects of film, including his books A Short History of Film (co-authored with Gwendolyn Audrey Foster) and A History of Horror. From 1999 through the end of 2014, he was co-editor, along with Gwendolyn Audrey Foster, of the Quarterly Review of Film and Video. In addition, he is notable as an experimental American filmmaker with films made over several decades, and the Museum of Modern Art exhibited his works in 2003. He taught at Rutgers University, The New School in New York, the University of Amsterdam in the Netherlands, and as of May 2020, is the James E. Ryan professor emeritus of film studies at the University of Nebraska–Lincoln.

== Early years ==
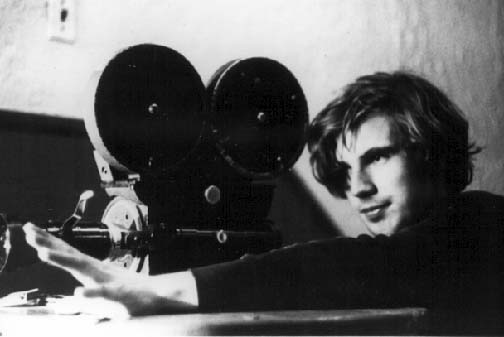
Dixon in 1969.

Dixon was born in 1950 in New Brunswick, a city in New Jersey halfway between New York City and Philadelphia. He grew up in Highland Park, New Jersey, and graduated from Highland Park High School in 1968. In the late 1960s, he was a member of New York's "underground" experimental film scene while working as a writer for Life Magazine and Andy Warhol's Interview magazine. In 1970, he co-founded the musical group Figures of Light. In London, he participated in Arts Lab in Drury Lane, making and screening short films. Returning to the United States, he worked with an experimental Los Angeles-based video collective called TVTV. Dixon received a Ph.D. in English from Rutgers University in 1982.

== Experimental films ==
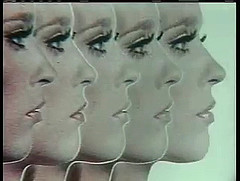
A still from Wheeler Winston Dixon's film Serial Metaphysics

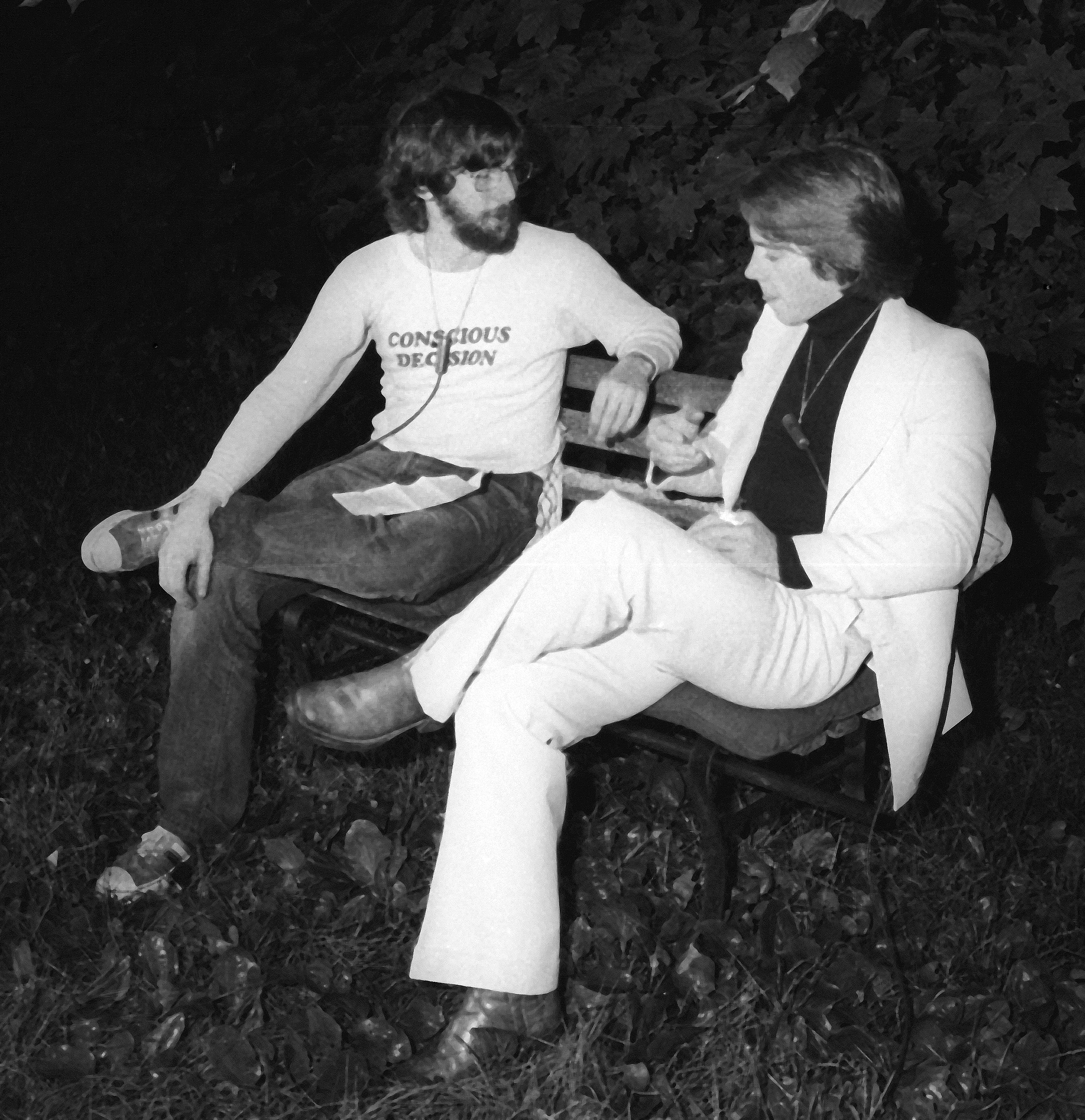
A still from Wheeler Winston Dixon's film An Evening with Chris Jangaard

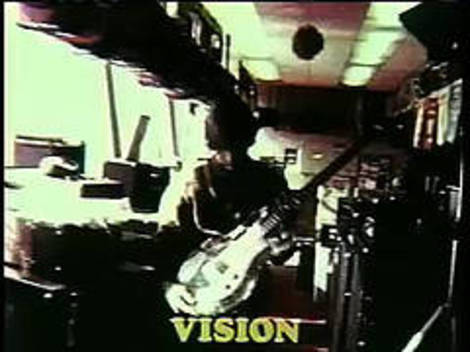
A still from Wheeler Winston Dixon's film London Clouds

During the course of several decades, Dixon made numerous experimental films. In 1991, along with filmmaker Gwendolyn Audrey Foster, he made a documentary entitled Women Who Made the Movies. In 1995, in France, he made a film entitled Squatters. In 2003, the Museum of Modern Art acquired all of his experimental films, including the following:

- Quick Constant and Solid Instant (1969)
- Madagascar, or, Caroline Kennedy's Sinful Life in London (1976)
- Serial Metaphysics (1972)
- What Can I Do? (1993)

His films have also been screened at the British Film Institute, the Whitney Museum of American Art, the Jewish Museum, The San Francisco Cinématheque, Arts Lab, The Collective for Living Cinema and The Kitchen Center for Experimental Art. In March and April 2018, along with Gwendolyn Audrey Foster, the BWA Contemporary Art Gallery in Katowice, Poland, presented a month long retrospective of Foster and Dixon's new video work. In May 2018, he presented a screening of his videos, along with the work of Gwendolyn Audrey Foster and Bill Domonkos at The Museum of Human Achievement in Austin, Texas. In the summer of 2018, he had a one-person show at Filmhuis Cavia in Amsterdam, and his "Catastrophe Series" of ten videos were screened as part of a group show at Studio 44 Gallery in Stockholm, Sweden. In the fall of 2018, he had a one-person show at La Lumière Collective in Montreal, Canada. In December 2018, he had a one-person show at Studio 44 in Stockholm, and a one-person show at the OT301 Gallery in Amsterdam. In January 2019, his complete video work was collected in the UCLA Film and Television Archive in Los Angeles. On June 23, 2019, he had an invited one person screening of his new digital video work at the Los Angeles Filmforum at the Spielberg Theater.

== Scholarship and film criticism ==
Dixon writes extensively. He has published in Senses of Cinema, Cinéaste, Interview, Film Quarterly, Literature/Film Quarterly, Films in Review, Post Script, Journal of Film and Video, Film Criticism, New Orleans Review, Film International, Film and Philosophy and other journals. His book A History of Horror was reviewed by Martin A. David who criticized it as a compilation lacking a narrative structure, although David noted there were "generous and moving portraits" of horror masters such as Bela Lugosi, Boris Karloff, and Lon Chaney Jr. Dixon was quoted commenting on horror films, women directors, Hollywood film moguls, new technologies for delivering movies such as streaming and 3-D, and public relations of movie stars and directors. He has been quoted about the film business, such as discussing firms such as Miramax. His views have been quoted about particular movies. In addition, he has talked about late night television shows. He is regarded as an authority of future trends in filmmaking; for example, in 2013, he described the current decade as a "postfilmic era" when "movie film will no longer exist and all movies will be shot digitally". He predicts that film will cease to exist, since all movies will be digitally delivered to theaters. He has been critical of filmmakers such as Quentin Tarantino:

It's sheer exploitation filmmaking with no resonance, taste or value, but it delivers what the action crowd wants: violence, violence and more violence, all served up with a knowing wink in a very postmodern fashion. In short, Quentin Tarantino movies are long, empty, derivative and junk food for the mind, with no substance or nutritional value.

— Wheeler Winston Dixon, 2012, in USA Today.

As a film historian, he wrote about the moguls of the 1950s:

(The corporate rulers of film) all figured they’d be immortal...They couldn’t envision a world where they didn’t exist. They couldn’t envision a world in which they were not the head of 20th Century Fox or the head of Columbia or the head of Paramount or the head of MGM or the head of Universal. When they died, a huge corporate scramble began.”

— Wheeler Winston Dixon, October 2012

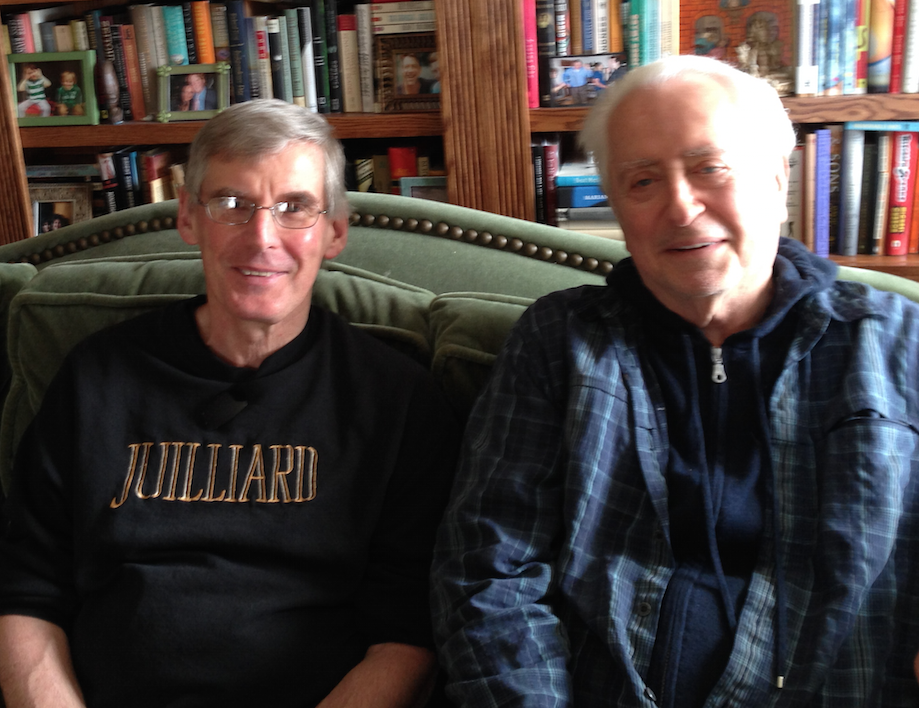
Wheeler Winston Dixon and Robert Downey Sr. in 2016.

In 2014, when computer hackers infiltrated Sony Pictures Entertainment, Dixon was quoted in the Los Angeles Times that the exposure of confidential studio emails and films served as a "wake-up call to the entire industry." In December 2015, he was quoted by Manohla Dargis in the New York Times on the demise of the DVD format, saying that "if you go on Amazon and you see some great black-and-white film, and it’s going for $3, or any kind of foreign or obscure film, buy it, because it’s going out of print, and they’re not going to put them back into print.”

In 2020, the New York Times interviewed Dixon on the new wave of horror films from Universal Studios, and why the more recent "Dark Universe" films were unsuccessful. Dixon noted that "there will be films about Dracula, Frankenstein, the Wolf Man, the Mummy, long after we’re gone. They’ll still be mining these things. But the ones that will be effective will be made by people who are sincerely invested in the material and treat these creatures with deadly seriousness."

In 2016, Dixon returned to experimental cinema working in HD video, with such films as An American Dream, Still Life, and Closed Circuit. From 2010 to 2020, he coordinated film studies at the University of Nebraska–Lincoln. He has also written extensively on the films of the late Robert Downey Sr.; Dixon and Downey were friends from the late 1960s up until Downey Sr.'s death in 2021. In 2022, Dixon participated in the BFI / Sight and Sound poll of the greatest films of all time, selecting Andy Warhol's The Chelsea Girls as his top pick. In October 2025, the fourth edition of his book A Short History of Film, co-written with Gwendolyn Audrey Foster, was published by Rutgers University Press.

== Personal life ==
Dixon is the nephew of the artist Nina Barr Wheeler.

== Publications ==
His books (as author or editor) include:

- Synthetic Cinema: The 21st Century Movie Machine (Palgrave Macmillan, 2019)
- The Films of Terence Fisher: Hammer Horror and Beyond (Auteur / Columbia University Press, 2017)
- A Brief History of Comic Book Movies, with Richard Graham (Palgrave Macmillan, 2017)
- Hollywood in Crisis or: The Collapse of the Real (Palgrave Macmillan, 2016)
- Black & White Cinema: A Short History (Rutgers University Press, 2015)
- Dark Humor in Films of the 1960s (Palgrave Macmillan, 2015)
- Cinema at The Margins (Anthem Press, London, 2013)
- Streaming: Movies, Media and Instant Access (University Press of Kentucky, 2013)
- Death of the Moguls: The End of Classical Hollywood (Rutgers University Press, 2012)
- 21st Century Hollywood: Movies in the Era of Transformation, with Gwendolyn Audrey Foster (Rutgers University Press, 2011)
- A History of Horror (Rutgers University Press, 2010; Second Revised and Expanded Edition, 2023)
- Film Noir and The Cinema of Paranoia (Edinburgh University Press and Rutgers University Press, 2009)
- A Short History of Film, co-authored with Gwendolyn Audrey Foster (Rutgers University Press) and I.B. Tauris, 2008; Second Edition 2013, Third Edition 2018, Fourth Edition 2025)
- Film Talk: Directors at Work (Rutgers University Press, 2007)
- Visions of Paradise: Images of Eden in the Cinema (Rutgers University Press, 2006)
- American Cinema of the 1940s: Themes and Variations (Rutgers University Press, 2006)
- Lost in the Fifties: Recovering Phantom Hollywood (Southern Illinois UP, 2005)
- Film and Television After 9/11 (editor, Southern Illinois UP, 2004)
- Visions of the Apocalypse: Spectacles of Destruction in American Cinema (Wallflower, 2003)
- Straight: Constructions of Heterosexuality in the Cinema (State University of New York Press, 2003)
- Experimental Cinema: The Film Reader, co-edited with Gwendolyn Audrey Foster (Routledge, 2002).
- Disaster and Memory: Celebrity Culture and the Crisis of Hollywood Cinema (Columbia University Press, 1999)
- The Exploding Eye: A Re-Visionary History of the American Experimental Cinema (State University of New York Press, 1997)
- The Films of Jean-Luc Godard (State University of New York Press, 1997)
- The Transparency of Spectacle: Meditations on the Moving Image (State University of New York Press Series in Postmodern Culture, 1998)
- It Looks at You: Notes on the Returned Gaze of Cinema (State University of New York Press, 1995)
- Re-Viewing British Cinema: 1900-1992 (State University of New York Press, 1994)
- The Early Film Criticism of François Truffaut (Indiana University Press, 1993)
- The Cinematic Vision of F. Scott Fitzgerald (UMI Research Press, 1986)

=== Filmography ===
==== Independent films ====
- Wedding (1969)
- Quick Constant and Solid Instant (1969)
- The DC Five Memorial Film (1969)
- London Clouds (1970)
- Serial Metaphysics (1972)
- Waste Motion (1974)
- Tightrope (1974)
- Stargrove (1974)
- Gaze (1974)
- An Evening with Chris Jangaard (1974)
- Dana Can Deal (1974)
- Damage (1974)
- Un Petit Examen, and Not So Damned Petit Either, or, the Light Shining Over the Dark (1974)
- Madagascar, or, Caroline Kennedy's Sinful Life in London (1974)
- The Diaries (1986)
- Distance (1987)
- Women Who Made the Movies (1992), co-directed with Gwendolyn Audrey Foster
- What Can I Do? (1994)
- Squatters (1995)
- An American Dream (2016)
- Summer Storm (2016)
- Still Life (2016)
- The Shapes of Things (2016)
- Closed Circuit (2016)
- City (2016)
- Lago di Garda (2016)
- Acceleration (2016)

==== Commercial films ====
- Amazing World of Ghosts (1978)
- UFO Exclusive (1978)
- Mysteries from the Bible (1979)
- UFO: Top Secret (1979)
- Attack from Outer Space (1979)
- World of Mystery (1979)
