= Sawyer Avenue, Sunday Afternoon =

- Directed by: Bill Morrison
- Produced by: Bill Morrison; Jamie Kalven; María Inés Zamudio
- Edited by: Bill Morrison
- Release date: April 18, 2026 (Visions du Réel)
- Running time: 18 minutes
- Country: United States
- Language: English

Sawyer Avenue, Sunday Afternoon is a 2026 documentary short film edited and directed by Bill Morrison. It examines the mass deportation program led by the United States Immigration and Customs Enforcement (ICE) during the course of one afternoon in a Chicago public park.

== Release ==
The film premiered at the 2026 Visions du Réel, where it received Special Mention in the International Medium Length & Short Film Competition. It was also selected for the 53rd Telluride Film Festival.

== Synopsis ==
On October 12, 2025, a Latino man was seized without warrant by unidentified and masked agents from the United States Immigration and Customs Enforcement on a Sunday afternoon near Chicago's Albany Park.

== Production ==
The film utilizes cell phone and body camera footages to show the chaotic events on said Sunday afternoon.
