= Christina Battle =

Canadian video and installation artist

Christina Battle is a video and installation artist who was born in Edmonton, Alberta, Canada. She holds a Master of Fine Arts from the San Francisco Art Institute (San Francisco, CA) and a certificate in Film Studies from Ryerson University (Toronto, Ontario). She also holds a Bachelor of Science from the University of Alberta (Edmonton, Alberta).

Battle's work has been displayed internationally in Zurich, Switzerland at the VideoEx Experimental Film & Video Festival; at the Jihlava Documentary Festival in Czech Republic; at the EXiS Festival in Seoul, South Korea; at the London Film Festival; at the International Film Festival Rotterdam in the Netherlands; at the Whitney Biennial in New York; and at SF Cinematheque (San Francisco). Her work has also been shown across Canada including in Halifax, Toronto, Winnipeg, Montreal and as far North as Dawson City, Yukon.

Battle has taught film studies at the University of Colorado at Boulder, and at Metro State University of Denver. She is currently based in London, Ontario according to her website.

== Artistic career ==
A biography of Battle by the Canadian Filmmaker's Distribution Centre (CFMDC) traces her artistic beginnings to her employment at Niagara Custom Lab, called "one of the most important film labs for experimental artists in Canada." At the lab, Christina Battle

was introduced to the power of colour and the importance of the lab in shaping it [...] she began to experiment with different film stocks, with ways to push the boundaries of colour processing through timing. She learned to work with contact and optical printers, colour filters, emulsion and tinting.

In 2006, Battle contributed two films for Behind These Walls, a program of short films presented at La Maison du Cinema in Sherbrooke, Quebec. The program shared a name with one of the artist's works (Behind these walls and under the stairs, which was presented first on the program). Battle also contributed the film that closed the presentation (Three hours, fifteen minutes before the hurricane, described in a curatorial essay as "finely outlined Victorianesque drawings collaged onto the surface of the black film stock seemingly float[ing] on the darkened space, intercut with titles that narrate the storm's impending approach"). Later that year, the city of Toronto commissioned her work for Nuit Blanche, curated by Kim Simon.

In 2007, Battle was featured in the "Spotlight Series" of the Canadian Filmmakers Distribution Centre (CFMDC) which coincided with the release of a DVD of her video work. The study guide for the DVD references several of the artist's early films, namely:

- buffalo lifts (2004)
- paradise falls, new mexico (2004), described in a 2014 interview as a "double projection [...] where one screen depicts images of cinematic cowboys rife with all the tropes of the genre, contrasted by the other screen devoted to documenting the ghost towns left behind by the real Wild West."
- fall storm (california, 2003) (2004)
- the distance between here and there (2005)
- hysteria (2006)
- as storms take shape in the distance (2007)

The artist's published book lists her solo exhibitions from this time period:

- Memories of Moments from Here and There: Recent and New Works by Christina Battle (2005), part of the New Directions in Cinema series of the Liaison of Independent Filmmakers of Toronto
- As storms take shape in the distance (2007), at the Fleishman Gallery in Toronto in 2007
- The Progress of the Storm (2008), at the Canadian Film Institute (Cafe Ex), Ottawa
- Archive Fever 1.0 (2009) at International House in Philadelphia, Pennsylvania

In 2008, Battle presented Uncharted Histories: Pirates at the Toronto Images Festival. Her creative techniques were documented in a published essay by Jon Davies:

Battle began with extensive historical research, finding text and images to incorporate into the project. She re-photographed individual images with a trusty 35mm movie camera set to expose individual frames, developed the footage, and then boiled it in order to separate the image-carrying emulsion from the celluloid's base, and finally transferred these fragile images to clear plastic acetate to compose the final image. [...] These collages are necessarily piecemeal due to the breaking down of the original image into 35mm rectuangular fragments. All their edges are visible.

In 2011, Battle was awarded a project commission for the 30th Anniversary of the Liaison of Independent Filmmakers of Toronto.

2011 was also the year of the exhibition Filing Memory at the Foreman Art Gallery in Sherbrooke, Quebec. The central video installation was titled wandering through secret storms (2009), described as "a triptych consisting of FBI archival records that are almost entirely blacked out, rendering the documents incomprehensible, and women filing records."

In 2012, Battle participated in a project called "Archival Dialogues: Reading the Black Star Collection," an event which inaugurated the exhibition space of the Ryerson Image Centre at Ryerson University in Toronto.

Mapping the Prairies Through Disaster (2012) "explores the effects of historical environmental disaster on communities" in the words of interviewer Clint Enns in an interview published in C Magazine / Contemporary Art & Criticism. NOW Magazine (Toronto, ON) described the piece as a video work, with photographs of "decaying rural buildings under sunny skies." The video was overlaid with "short quotes from survivors' descriptions of the storms" and was projected "in a room clad with reflective metal sheeting, a reference to the power of dust storms to electrify metal." The audio was "a soundtrack of staticky 'sferic' recordings [of] broadband impulses created by lightning strikes."

The article in C Magazine contains a description of The Twelve Devil's Graveyards Around the World (2013), which "focuses on an archival document of the same name" in the words of the interviewer. The work is described as "the image of an icosahedron, in addition to an equilateral triangle, the ideal viewing location or the potential site for strange anomalies to occur." The interview also makes reference to a 2013 piece called Explorations of an Unexpected Time Traveller.

2013 also saw the presentation of we're not exactly sure what just happened, "a series of four one-minute films" at the Toronto Urban Film Festival. The publication Blouin Art Info Canada contains a quote from the artist that speaks to the work's provenance:

"I was interested in the subway itself as a platform for disseminating the news," [Christina Battle] says, remarking on how the hurried atmosphere of commuter transit contributes to the potential for news reporting to convey a highly emotional but fundamentally content-less message.

In 2014, Battle presented dearfield, colorado at an exhibition was called What Was Will Be at Gallery 44 in Toronto, Ontario. The magazine Canadian Art described the artist's video installation, starting with images of "the present-day ruins of the town:"

Yellow wildflowers wave in the breeze around structures of rotting wood and peeling paint. Birdsong is audible, as are some crackling sferics [...] that Battle recorded at a very low frequency. [...] Shiny metallic aluminum panels also line the walls and floor around the video projection.

What Was Will Be was featured in ArToronto and in the publication NOW Toronto. Battle's dearfield, colorado is described as "images of the town's deserted and desolate buildings with quotes taken from first-hand accounts of dust storms."

In 2015, the Thames Art Gallery (Chatham, Ontario) presented End Transmission by Christina Battle, which "takes place after an environmental collapse, based on recent disaster headlines, in a soon-to-be future after our own time’s intensifying inequality, debt, climate change, fossil fuel dependency and global food crisis." Also in 2015, Le Centre des arts actuels Skol (Montreal, Quebec) presented The people in this picture are standing on all that remained of a handsome residence, the artist's evocation of the July 31, 1987 tornado in Edmonton, Alberta.

== Curatorial career ==
In 2018, Battle curated an exhibition the Cold Cuts Video Festival in Dawson City, Yukon. There's something in the way featured work by Association for Decentering Landscapes, Tanya Lukin Linklater, Amanda Boulos, and Liz Knox. It opened on March 30 and examined the ways in which artists use the tools of video to stage and frame complex subjects.

On October 17, 2019, Battle curated Reclaiming the Invisible, an event at the John and Maggie Mitchell Art Gallery in MacEwan University. Together, Battle and participants considered how some plants have the ability to absorb more metals than others. A follow-up of the event occurred on November 6 along with a small group of artists.

Battle was guest curator of Grasping at the Roots, an exhibition on view at the John and Maggie Mitchell Art Gallery from January 17 to March 28. The exhibition featured work by Debbie Ebanks Schlums, Serena Lee, Eugenio Salas, and Shawn Tse with recent video by Scott Portingale.Grasping at the Roots took cues from mycorrhizae, mutually beneficial associations between fungi and plants, and operated from the premise that this strategy of care has the ability to foster and develop community in sustainable and meaningful ways. Artists in Grasping at the Roots incorporated a variety of tactics and material forms along with site specificity in order to translate works that perform actively in the world for the space of the gallery.

== Published works ==
In 2011, Battle published Filing Memory, a hard-cover publication in English and French. The book was edited by Vicky Chainey Gagnon, and Battle has described the work as a "collaboration" between herself and the editor. The book was published by the Foreman Art Gallery of Bishop's University in Sherbrooke, Quebec, and was based on the gallery's Fall 2010 exhibition of the artist's work.

The foreword to Filing Memory describes some of Battle's artistic techniques, including collage and photogram techniques, "laying figures on film stock and shining a light onto them to inscribe their shadow into the material." The effect is described as, "multi-layering of colours [...] a shock of vibrancy against a wall of pure black."

Battle has described the exhibit and book as "built around the single-channel video wandering through secret storms," which is about "what is left out of archives and 'official' history records," in her words.

In addition to Filing Memory (2011), Christina Battle has published writing and interviews in INCITE Journal of Experimental Media. In 2011, she contributed "Recalling the International Experimental Media Congress of 2010" to Volume 3 of that publication (2011–2012), which was an analysis of her transcription of some of the talks given at the congress the previous year. In 2015 she contributed "Hollywood Movies, Media Hype, and the Contemporary Survivalist Movement: An Appropriated Study" to INCITE Volume 5. INCITE has also published Christina Battle's interviews with Gwen Trutnau (published January 5, 2015) Leslie Supnet (June 18, 2015), and Jesse Malmed (published September 7, 2017).

== Primary source archive (Artexte, Montreal, Quebec) ==
Primary sources pertaining to Battle's expositions and commissions are available at Artexte (Montreal, Quebec) which is "a library, research centre and exhibition space for contemporary art". As of April 2017, the archive has copies of programs to approximately 20 exhibits of Christina Battle's work.

From the Artexte archive, we can discern:

- The earliest item is a handmade program to New Toronto Works, dated January 31, 2004. Christina Battle showed a short film at this exhibition, which was sponsored by the Liaison of Independent Filmmakers of Toronto (LIFT).
- A program is extant that outlines Christina Battle's work commissioned for the 2006 Whitney Biennial in New York. A second program is available to a show at a New York gallery called White Box.
- A program and self-guided tout booklet are extant for Time Inside the Image [3], which showed at the Foreman Art Gallery of Bishop's University from January 31 to March 31, 2007. (The Foreman Art Gallery would publish Filing Memory by the artist in 2011.)
- A museum program is extant for the Filing Memory exhibit on which the artist's book is based.
- In 2012, Battle was featured at the Aspen Art Museum in Denver, along with six other artists—a program is available.
- Handmade programs are extant for Wandering Through, Across and Within, an exhibition curated by Battle, which was shown in Denver, Colorado (August 30, 2013), Winnipeg, Manitoba (September 23, 2013) and Victoria, British Columbia (October 19, 2013).
- In 2014, Battle held an exhibition and talk at the Klondike Institute of Art & Culture in Dawson City, Yukon for which a program is available.
- The archive includes a program for One In Which We Are, shown at the SOMArts Cultural Center in San Francisco, California. Christina Battle's name was first on the list of artists for this exhibition which took place May 1 to 27, 2015.

== Awards and commissions ==
Battle has earned the following awards and commissions (not an exhaustive list):

- "Archival Dialogues: Reading the Black Star Collection" – Commission – Ryerson Image Centre (Toronto, 2010–12)
- Steamwhistle Homebrew Award for "Excellenece and promise in a local artist: Uncharted Histories: Pirates" (Toronto), 2008)
- Images Festival Steamwhistle Homebrew Award for "Excellenece and promise in a local artist: three hours, fifteen minutes before the hurricane struck" (Toronto), 2008)
- James Broughton Film Award – San Francisco Art Institute (San Francisco, CA, 2005)

== Selected group exhibitions ==
Battle has participated in a number of group exhibitions including:

- Ryerson Image Centre – "Archived Disasters" (commission) – curated by Doina Popescu and Peggy Gale (Toronto, 2012)
- Pacific Cinematique – "wandering through secret storms" – curated by Amy Lynn Kazymerchyk (2012)
- Lexington Art League – Re:play – "Behind the Shadows' & untitled (birds)" – curated by Sarah Wylie A VanMeter (Lexington, KY, 2011)
- Espace Virtuel – "when the wind shifted" – part of Strategies of the Medium / Strategies du Milieu – curated by Ben Donoghue (Chicoutimie, QC, 2009)
- YYZ Artists' Outlet – "Uncharted Histories: Pirates" – As part of the Images Festival (Toronto, 2008)
- Foreman Art Gallery – "Time Inside the Image" – curated by Vicky Chainey Gagnon (Sherbrooke, QC, 2007)
- Mount Saint Vernon Art Gallery – "Pulse: Film And Painting After The Image" – curated by Ingrid Jenkner & Barbara Sternberg (Halifax, NS, 2006)
- Built Blacneh 2006 – "when the wind shifted" – part of civic insomnia – curated by Kim Simon (Toronto, 2006)
- White Box – "The Searchers" – curated by Patricia Malone (New York)
- The Whitney Biennial – Day for Night (New York)
