= Bill Morrison (director) =

American filmmaker and artist

Bill Morrison (born November 17, 1965) is an Academy Award nominated filmmaker and artist. His films often combine rare archival material set to contemporary music, and have been screened in theaters, cinemas, museums, galleries, and concert halls around the world.

== Early life and career ==
Morrison was born in Chicago, Illinois. He attended Reed College from 1983 to 1985, and graduated with a BFA from the Cooper Union School of Art in 1989. He received the President's Citation from Cooper Union in 2016. He has lived and worked in New York City's East Village since 1985.

Morrison had a mid-career retrospective at New York's Museum of Modern Art, October 2014 – March 2015. He is a fellow of the John Simon Guggenheim Memorial Foundation, and has received the Alpert Awards in the Arts, a grant from the National Endowment for the Arts, Creative Capital, and the Foundation for Contemporary Arts Grants to Artists award (2003).

His theatrical projection design with Ridge Theater has been recognized with two Bessie Awards, and an Obie Award.

Morrison has collaborated with some of the most influential composers and performers including John Adams, Gavin Bryars, Bill Frisell, Philip Glass, Michael Gordon, Henryk Górecki, Jóhann Jóhannsson, Kronos Quartet, David Lang, Steve Reich, Michael Harrison, Maya Beiser, Julia Wolfe and Michael Montes among many others. Morrison has occasionally acted in other directors' films, notably Andrew Bujalski's Mutual Appreciation and its quasi-sequel Peoples House.

== Accolades ==
Decasia (2002), his feature-length collaboration with composer Michael Gordon, was selected by the Library of Congress to its National Film Registry in 2013, becoming the first film of the 21st century selected to the list. It has been hailed by J. Hoberman as "the most widely praised American avant-garde film of the fin de siècle." The director Errol Morris reportedly commented while viewing Decasia that "This may be the greatest movie ever made". The film was originally commissioned by the Basel Sinfonietta to be shown on three screens surrounding the audience, behind which 55 musicians performed Michael Gordon's score.

In 2011, Spark of Being, a collaboration with composer/trumpeter Dave Douglas, won The Douglas Edwards Experimental/Independent Film/Video Award at the 2011 Los Angeles Film Critics Association Awards.

In 2014, The Great Flood, a collaboration with composer/guitarist Bill Frisell, received the Smithsonian Magazine's American Ingenuity Award for Historical Scholarship.

In 2016 Morrison presented the world premiere of Dawson City: Frozen Time in the Orizzonti section of the 73rd Venice International Film Festival, and the North American premiere at the 54th New York Film Festival. In 2017, The film was released by Kino Lorber, and was named the Best Documentary of 2017 by the Boston Society of Film Critics, was awarded a Critics' Choice Award for Most Innovative Documentary, an International Documentary Association (IDA) Creative Recognition Award for Best Editing, and was included on over 100 critics lists of the best films of 2017 and was later listed as one of the best films of the decade (2010s) by Associated Press, Los Angeles Times, Vanity Fair, among others. In 2019 it was released on DVD and Blu-ray in the UK by Second Run DVD.

In 2023, Morrison's film Incident (30', 2023) won the Best Short Documentary Award of 2023 from the International Documentary Association and Outstanding Nonfiction Short at the 2025 Cinema Eye Honors. It also earned him his first Academy Award nomination in the Documentary Short category at the 97th Academy Awards.

Morrison's collected works through 2014 were released as a 5-disc box set from Icarus Films in September 2014, and a 3-disc Blu-ray box set from the British Film Institute in May 2015. In 2023 Re-Voir Video released a 15-film blu-ray set of Morrison's work entitled "Footprints".

Critics have commented on the historical dimensions of Morrison's works. Writing about Dawson City: Frozen Time (2016) in The New York Review of Books, Deborah Eisenberg noted, "It’s chastening to witness the pliant material of history as it’s being made and at the same time what that history has come to mean and what it has brought into being." And in the Los Angeles Review of Books, Seth Fein observed that The Village Detective: A Song Cycle (2021) "clarifies how time itself has been the evolving preoccupation of Morrison’s works and, consequently, their most significant contribution, not simply to the history of film but to the practice of history."

== Filmography as director ==
- Sawyer Avenue, Sunday Afternoon (2026)
- Incident (2023)
- Her Violet Kiss (2021)
- let me come in (2021)
- Buried News (2021)
- The Village Detective: A Song Cycle (2021)
- Curly's Thanksgiving (2020)
- Cinematograph (2018)
- Electricity (2018)
- The Unchanging Sea (2018)
- The Letter (2018)
- Weaving (2018)
- Dawson City: Postscript (2017)
- Dawson City: Frozen Time (2016)
- Little Orphant Annie (2016)
- The Dockworker's Dream (2016)
- Back to the Soil (2014)
- Beyond Zero: 1914-1918 (2014)
- The Great Flood (2013)
- All Vows (2013)
- Re:Awakenings (2013)
- Just Ancient Loops (2012)
- Tributes - Pulse (2011)
- The Miners' Hymns (2011)
- Spark of Being (2010)
- Release (2010)
- Dystopia (2008)
- Fuel (2007)
- Who By Water (2007)
- The Highwater Trilogy (2006)
- How To Pray (2006)
- Outerborough (2005)
- Gotham (2004)
- Light is Calling (2004)
- The Mesmerist (2003)
- East River (2003)
- Decasia (2002)
- Trinity (2000)
- Ghost Trip (2000)
- City Walk (1999)
- The Film of Her (1996)
- Nemo (1995)
- The World Is Round (1994)
- The Death Train (1993)
- Footprints (1992)
- Photo Op (1992)
- Lost Avenues (1991)
- Night Highway (1990)
