= The Movie Orgy =

1968 film by Joe Dante

- Title screen from trailer
- Directed by: Joe Dante
- Produced by: Jon Davison
- Edited by: Joe Dante
- Release date: 1968
- Country: United States
- Language: English

The Movie Orgy is a 1968 film directed by Joe Dante and produced by Jon Davison. It was an evolving compilation of film clips, commercials, and film trailers, initially assembled by Dante when he was an undergraduate at the Philadelphia College of Art. At its longest, it ran for seven and a half hours and could be considered the analog prelude to the mash-up videos and supercut edits now prevalent on digital platforms like YouTube and Vimeo.

== Summary ==
The film stands as a simultaneous celebration and campy tweaking of mid-20th century Americana, culling liberally from the B-movie cinema of Dante and Davison's youth (including brief clips from The Phantom Planet and Teenagers from Outer Space), early TV commercials, newsreel footage of early A-bomb tests, cartoons, westerns, sci-fi, bloopers, trailers (including two from "King of Kiddie Matinee" K. Gordon Murray) and war movies as well as clips from children's TV shows its college-age audiences had forgotten they had seen. Perhaps most memorable among these is the excerpted moment from Andy's Gang of a puppeteer-controlled cat and mouse performing “Jesus Loves Me".

Elements of several features are revisited throughout the movie as recurrent, serialized comic motifs. Among these serialized movies in the longer-form version were College Confidential, Speed Crazy, Earth vs. the Flying Saucers, I Was a Teenage Werewolf, Attack of the 50 Foot Woman, Beginning of the End, The Giant Gila Monster and The Amazing Colossal Man that were rotated in and out. Bizarre non-sequitur elements are featured in between the recurrent narrative vignettes, including strange advertisements (including one for Carter's Little Liver Pills) and educational films. The film was designed to be a free-flowing, communal audience experience. Interactivity (e.g. sing-alongs to showcased television show theme songs) was encouraged.

Among the numerous celebrities featured were Rod Serling, Alfred Hitchcock, the Beatles, W.C. Fields, Groucho Marx, Ann-Margret, Ngo Dinh Diem, President Dwight D. Eisenhower, President Richard M. Nixon, The Animals, Dean Martin, and Abbott and Costello.

The song playing during the opening montage is "Flash, Bam, Pow" by The Electric Flag from the soundtrack to the 1967 Roger Corman flick The Trip.

== Release ==
The film, assembled without permission of the clips' owners, toured colleges and repertory cinemas with support from Schlitz beer. The film comprises clips of copyrighted materials, and thus the original edit can only be shown for free when it plays in museums and cinemas around the world. Joe Dante retains a copy. In December 2025, the American Genre Film Archive premiered the first official home video release with a 276 minute version on Blu-ray via Vinegar Syndrome.

It was also eventually released on Blu-ray by AGFA January 27, 2026.

== See also ==
- List of American films of 1968
- List of longest films
- A Movie – the seminal 1958 collage film by experimental filmmaker Bruce Conner, which is similar in structure
- Golden Age of Television (1950s-1960s)
- Americana
- Meme
- Mystery Science Theater 3000 - a cult show which featured some of the aforementioned films
