= Mock Up on Mu =

- Directed by: Craig Baldwin
- Written by: Craig Baldwin
- Produced by: Craig Baldwin
- Starring: Damon Packard; Kal Spelletich; Michelle Silva; Stoney Burke
- Cinematography: Bill Daniel
- Edited by: Sylvia Schedelbauer
- Release date: April 28, 2008 (SFIFF)
- Running time: 114 minutes
- Country: United States
- Language: English

Mock Up on Mu is a 2008 science fiction collage film directed by American experimental filmmaker Craig Baldwin. The film is a fictionalized continuation of the stories of L. Ron Hubbard, Jack Parsons, and Marjorie Cameron. Baldwin assembled it mostly from found footage but began introducing more original live-action footage than in earlier projects.

== Plot ==
In the year 2019, L. Ron Hubbard lives on Mu, a Scientology theme park and rehab center on the Moon. He sends Agent C to Las Vegas to seduce a playboy defense contractor named Lockheed Martin and then Richard Carlson. Carlson turns out to be the assumed identity of Jack Parsons, who has suffered amnesia ever since his purported death in 1952. He realizes that she is a spy and uncovers L. Ron's plot to build a space shuttle between Las Vegas and Mu as a cover for a weapons system.

Agent C and Jack discover the warlock Aleister Crowley living in a cavern. There, she recalls her previous life as Marjorie Cameron and her marriage to Jack; the two renew their relationship. Crowley assembles a resistance army that he turns against L. Ron and Lockheed.

== Cast ==
- Damon Packard as L. Ron Hubbard
- Kal Spelletich as Jack Parsons
- Michelle Silva as Marjorie Cameron
- Stoney Burke as Lockheed Martin

== Production ==
During the 1990s Erik Davis told Baldwin about the connection between Hubbard and Parsons through the Babalon Working. This became part of the characters' backstory in Spectres of the Spectrum, which prompted the Church of Scientology to send Baldwin a letter detailing their own account of Hubbard's time spent in Pasadena. He decided that he "couldn't write a better script than what the Scientologists had already provided," and incorporated the story into what became Mock Up on Mu.

Baldwin drew footage from an archive of thousands of films in the basement of his studio space, describing the process as "availabilism", using available works and creating associations between them rather than expending effort trying to find the best image; in Mock Up on Mu, he focuses particularly on educational and industrial films. He developed several techniques to connect live-action footage to the archival footage. He tinted and distorted the live-action images, used similar blocking to the archival footage, and shot the live-action scenes without sync sound so that the sound is slightly out of sync. Baldwin's rapid style of montage is influenced by the work of Stan Vanderbeek, Arthur Lipsett, and Robert Nelson.

== Release ==
Mock Up on Mu premiered at the 2008 San Francisco International Film Festival. It was screened at the New York Film Festival in 2008.

=== Critical reception ===
Manohla Dargis of The New York Times wrote that the film was "absorbing, confounding, exhausting and altogether stranger and more rib-ticklingly funny than most fiction". In his review for Slant Magazine, Bill Weber described Mock Up on Mu as "clever-to-a-fault" and "determinedly more obscure" than Baldwin's previous works. For Time Out New York, Joshua Rothkopf remarked that "it's nice to see Baldwin's still got fire…[but] even on Mu's own terms, Baldwin has been more savage and clever elsewhere."

Dennis Harvey of Variety magazine said that the "visually, sonically and subtextually dense" nature of the film was challenging but that "assimilating its internal logic actually makes repeat viewings more enjoyable." J. Hoberman spoke favorably of Baldwin's editing style, stating that his "liberated film fragments generate their own charge," and said that although the "narrative is not easy to follow…as with any religion or conspiracy theory, his method is characterized by a logic beyond logic."
