= Stoney Burke (performer) =

American street performer

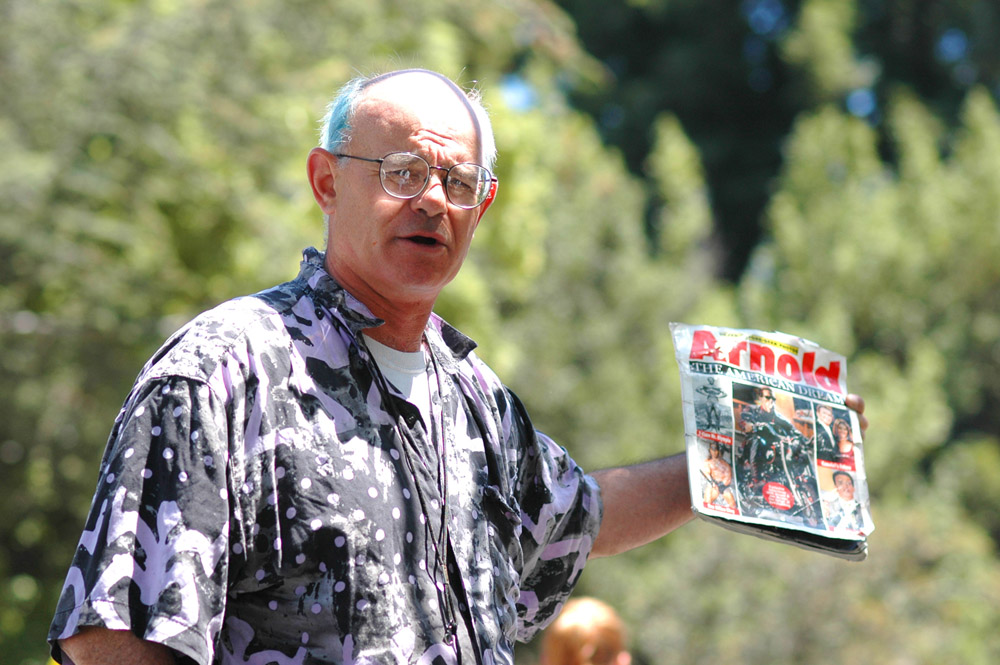
Stoney Burke commenting on Arnold Schwarzenegger becoming the governor of California

Stoney Burke (born January 17, 1953) is an American street performer and actor based in California. His street performances often emphasize the protected right of freedom of speech in the United States, in spite of his many arrests for speaking freely in public on college campuses, with experts categorizing his work as a form of civil disobedience.

In addition to his public speaking, Burke has appeared in many different film and television shows, including the documentary series The 90's, where he performed unscripted, live street interviews with politicians on the floor of the 1992 Republican National Convention. Burke is also the author of the book Weapon: Mouth–Adventures in the Free Speech Zone (2014).

== Early life ==
Stoney Burke was born Patrick Evans Francis Burke in Highland, Michigan, to a home he describes as "unstable." Social workers removed him from his birth mother and placed him in an orphanage at 18 months old. He was later adopted at the age of three and grew up north of Detroit in Romeo, with Irish Catholic parents who were active in the civil rights movement. He remembers his house being vandalized by racists in the neighborhood at the age of eight. He took the name "Stoney" from the 1962–63 TV series about rodeo rider Stoney Burke, portrayed by Jack Lord.

== Career ==
In 1975, Burke moved to Eugene, Oregon, and enrolled as a dance and theater major at the University of Oregon. He moved to the San Francisco Bay area in 1977 to study mime with Leonard Pitt, and soon began performing and commenting on current events. Comedy club listings in Bay Area newspapers show Burke performing at the Comedy Closet and the Other Cafe in February 1980.

Burke says he has "been hassled or arrested so many times practicing my free speech, I would bore you with the truth of it all." One of his first notable arrests occurred at San Francisco State University in 1979, where he was charged with "begging". He soon returned again to campus and was promptly arrested a second time. The next year, he was arrested at least five or more additional times, with his arrest at the 1980 Republican National Convention in July one of the most notable, after calling Henry Kissinger a fascist to his face.

After Ronald Reagan won the 1980 United States presidential election in November of that year, Burke helped organize a student protest at the University of California, Berkeley. The police arrested 52 people for occupying an administration building while 3000 marched in the streets in opposition to Reagan.

Burke is known for his presence on college campuses in California where he performs political comedy, most notably in Berkeley near Sather Gate. Burke routinely engages crowds throughout the day using conservative Republican perspectives as his primary satire subject matter.

Burke obtained a BA in speech and communications from San Francisco State University in 1991.

In another notable incident, an officer on campus wrote up a police report declaring Burke's mouth a "weapon" and used that as justification to arrest him. This was later used as the title for his book Weapon: Mouth–Adventures in the Free Speech Zone (2014).

== Film and television ==
Burke made his first appearance in the avant-garde film Citizen (1982), alongside Whoopi Goldberg in her screen debut. This was followed by his role in the film Alone in the T-Shirt Zone (1986) by Mike B. Anderson, who later became known for his award-winning work on The Simpsons.

He next appeared as himself on the second of three episodes of the American independent documentary series The 90's "Election Special", by Tom Weinberg and Joel Cohen that appeared on the Public Broadcasting Service (PBS) in 1992. On the episode "The Convention", Burke did street interviews at the 1992 Republican National Convention, including those with Pat Buchanan, Dan Quayle, Robert Novak, Jack Kemp, Alfonse D'Amato, and Oliver North. He also visited the Pro-Family, God & Country Rally, and gave a small speech at the main podium to the camera crew: "From this moment on, I declare that we as a people must get our act together, treat each other decently, share the wealth, promote the general welfare... and have fun."

Scott Williams of the Associated Press called this episode of The 90's "the most original in 'alternative television' since public access TV". WTTW, a PBS member television station in Chicago, found Burke's material objectionable and biased against Republicans, and cut much of it from their broadcast in the Chicago area. Video producer Bob Hercules said it was censored because of objections from the religious right and other conservatives.

Burke has also hosted his own show, Stoney Speaks, on public-access television cable TV. Burke was featured in a Swedish documentary called An American in America. He played a soup kitchen server in the 2001 movie Bartleby and a truck driver (credited as "Bike Carrier Driver") who is seen in the film The Matrix Reloaded (2003) carrying a load of motorcycles on his rig. He also had a major role playing Lockheed Martin in Craig Baldwin's Mock Up on Mu.

Stoney Burke in The Matrix Reloaded

== Recognition ==
The San Francisco Board of Supervisors in November 2006, passed a resolution that declared November 14, 2007 "Stoney, A Clown Who Rabble Rouses In Defense of Free Speech, Day".

The University of California, Berkeley, sailing team hosts an annual college sailing regatta named in Burke's honor.

== See also ==
- Swami X
