= Sylvia Schedelbauer =

Filmmaker

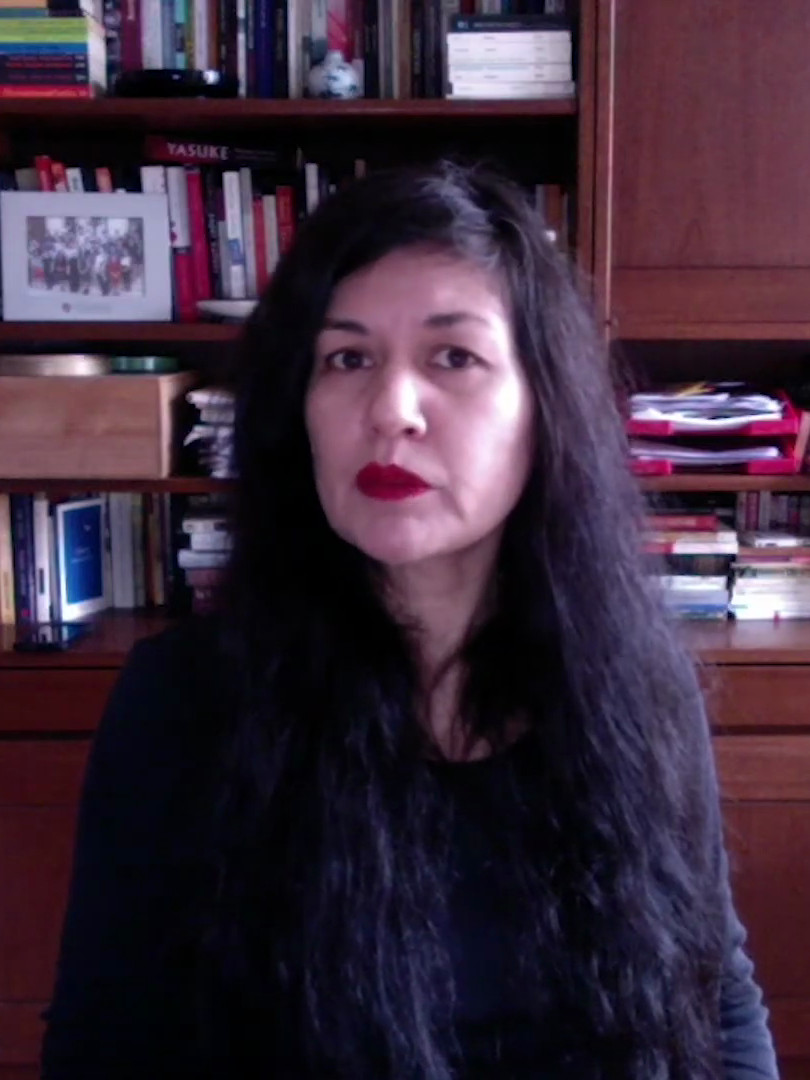
Sylvia Schedelbauer in 2021

Sylvia Schedelbauer (born 1973) is an experimental filmmaker.

== Biography ==
Schedelbauer was born in Tokyo, Japan in 1973, to a German father and a Japanese mother. She moved to Germany to attend the Berlin University of the Arts.

Her first short film Memories (2004) was screened at the International Short Film Festival Oberhausen. It is a documentary that presents a slideshow of family photos with voiceover reconstructing Schedelbauer's family history. Her next film Remote Intimacy marked a transition away from narrative and toward collage, with archival footage taken from home movies, newsreels, and educational films. Schedelbauer worked as an editor on Craig Baldwin's 2008 science fiction collage film Mock Up on Mu.

Schedelbauer's 2011 film Sounding Glass uses a strong flicker effect, with a score by Thomas Carnacki featuring the sounds of glass, water, and string instruments. Her 2014 film Sea of Vapors uses highly layered superimpositions to depict "the female body and its cycles, the connections that we feel toward nature." She used Final Cut Pro to create the film's shifting, flickering patterns, by repeatedly stacking images on top of each and exporting the result. In Wishing Well (2018), Schedelbauer creates a flickering pattern by combining images of a child playing and a drone.
