= Christian Haren =

American actor, model and activist

Christian Haren (February 1, 1935 – February 27, 1996) was an American stage and screen actor, model and community activist.

== Early life ==
Haren was born in San Bernardino County, California. He attended school and colleges in San Bernardino. In his 20s he served in the United States Army during the 1950s.

== Acting career ==
In the 1960s Haren received a studio contract from MGM and starred in Vincente Minnelli's Bells Are Ringing, Otto Preminger's In Harm's Way (a Paramount Pictures film), and Billy Rose's Jumbo. He starred on Broadway in the Bertolt Brecht play The Resistible Rise of Arturo Ui, produced by Tony Richardson.

He is best remembered for playing the role of the Marlboro Man in print advertisements in the early 1960s, and appearing in print ads for Budweiser Beer.

== Activism ==
Haren was openly gay, and was the proprietor of the popular Palm Springs gay bar CC Construction Co. in later years. In 1985, he was diagnosed with AIDS and became active in AIDS prevention education. He started "The Wedge", a "safe sex" AIDS prevention organization for teens in San Francisco. After living with the disease for over a decade, Haren died in 1996. Five well-known Marlboro men died of smoking related illnesses. Haren and Darrell Winfield (21 years as the Marlboro Man) were the two best known of all of men who portrayed the Marlboro Man, but who did not suffer ill effects from smoking.

== Death and legacy ==
Haren died in 1996 in San Francisco, California, of complications from AIDS, at the age of 61.

His life was the subject of the 1998 documentary short Castro Cowboy.

== Filmography ==
Television and Film
Year	Title	Role	Notes
1960	The DuPont Show with June Allyson	Attendant (credited as Chuck Haren)	(TV Series), 1 episode: "Emergency"
1960	Bells Are Ringing	Actor (uncredited)	(Musical film)
1960	Playhouse 90	Second Soldier (credited as Chuck Haren)	(TV Series), 1 episode: "In the Presence of Mine Enemies"
1960	Please Don't Eat the Daisies	Minor Role (uncredited)	(Film)
1962	Billy Rose's Jumbo	Lennie - Roustabout (uncredited)	(Musical film)
1963	Dr. Kildare	Vernon Beasley (credited as Chuck Haren)	(TV Series), 1 episode: "The Mosaic"
1963	The Eleventh Hour	Joe (credited as Chuck Haren)	(TV Series), 1 episode: "Which Man Will Die?"
1963-1964	The Lieutenant	Corporal Sandow / Cpl. Delbert Sandow (credited as Chuck Haren)	(TV Series), 5 episodes: "A Very Private Affair", "Captain Thomson", "A Troubled Image", "Fall from a White Horse" and "Capp's Lady"
1979	Lifeguard	Guy	(Film)
