= Billy Rose's Jumbo =

1962 film directed by Charles Walters

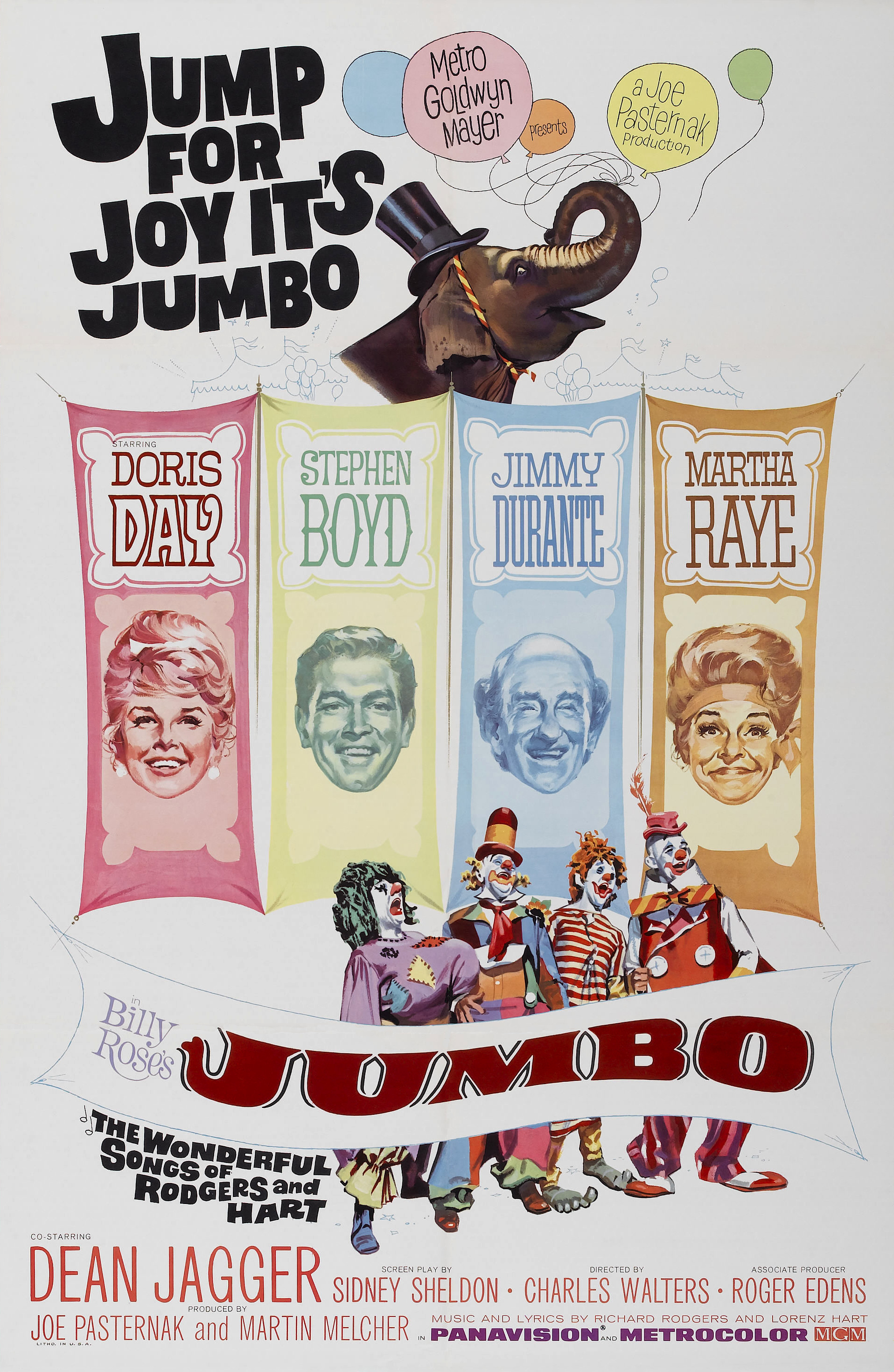
- Theatrical release poster
- Directed by: Charles Walters
- Screenplay by: Sidney Sheldon
- Based on: Jumbo; 1935 play by Ben Hecht; Charles MacArthur
- Produced by: Martin Melcher; Joe Pasternak
- Starring: Doris Day; Stephen Boyd; Jimmy Durante; Martha Raye
- Cinematography: William H. Daniels
- Edited by: Richard W. Farrell
- Music by: Richard Rodgers; Lorenz Hart
- Distributed by: Metro-Goldwyn-Mayer
- Release date: December 6, 1962
- Running time: 127 minutes
- Country: United States
- Language: English
- Budget: $5,256,000
- Box office: $4 million

Billy Rose's Jumbo is a 1962 American musical film released by Metro-Goldwyn-Mayer and starring Doris Day (in her last screen musical), Stephen Boyd, Jimmy Durante and Martha Raye. An adaptation of the stage musical Jumbo produced by Billy Rose, the film was directed by Charles Walters, written by Sidney Sheldon and features Busby Berkeley's choreography. It was nominated for an Academy Award for the adaptation of its Rodgers and Hart score.

The Broadway show Jumbo opened on November 16, 1935 and was the last musical produced at the New York Hippodrome before it was demolished in 1939. Original producer Billy Rose stipulated that if a film version was ever made based on the show, he must be credited in the title, even if he were not personally involved. Both the play and the film feature songs by Rodgers and Hart, although the film borrows two songs from their other shows. Boyd's singing voice was dubbed by studio singer Jimmy Joyce.

== Plot ==
'Pop' Wonder is the owner of the Wonder Circus, which arrives at a local town with its featured attraction, Jumbo the elephant. The circus is however in debt as he has gambled the earnings on craps games. His daughter, Kitty Wonder, is approached by three creditors who demand repayment. She promises that the circus will be sold out tonight so they will earn their money. Meanwhile, a mysterious newcomer named Sam arrives and is hired as a tent hand.

At the circus, various specialty acts perform including Jumbo. While changing costumes, Kitty and Pop learn that two of their acts are leaving as the John Noble Circus will pay them. After Jumbo's act, Pop calls for the Great Mantino, a high-wire act. Mantino does not show up when his name is called, but eventually he does. When the act is done, Sam reveals himself as the performer as the Mantino quit for the Noble Circus. Impressed with Sam's performance, Pop hires him.

To celebrate, Pop takes Sam to a craps game, where he has already gambled the earnings. Kitty finds her father at a saloon and plays a game herself to win the money back. During their carriage ride home, Sam states he switched the dice with loaded ones. Back at the circus, Kitty pays the performers, though she has forgotten about the three creditors. She tries once more to assuage the situation, but unpersuaded, one of them threatens to have the circus foreclosed. Luckily, Jumbo fakes a rampage, causing the creditors to run away.

As it turns out, Sam is the son of rival circus mogul John Noble, whose ambition is to buy the Wonder Circus for himself. Noble enlists Sam to infiltrate their rival and secretly buy Pop's IOUs, and therefore have the creditors grant him control of the circus.

Back on the circus grounds, Pop tries to shoot his longtime fiancée Lulu out of a cannon. Sam and Kitty begin to fall for each other. Later that night, a severe rainstorm rips open the big tent, causing the aerial performers including Kitty to become stuck on the rigs. Sam guides the crew to help the performers jump and land on a catch net. Afterwards, Pop and Lulu agree to marry. Sam consoles Kitty, who is shaken by the near-death experience.

On the day of Pop and Lulu's wedding, John Noble arrives, stating he has purchased Pop's debt for repayment, therefore he owns the Wonder Circus. He casually divulges that Sam is his son. Due to this, Kitty is devastated and Pop decides to retire. Jumbo is soon taken by Noble's men. The next morning, Kitty, Pop and Lulu form their own traveling carnival.

Sam, still in love with Kitty, finds her and expresses guilt for his actions, stating he has left his father. He states he can help revive the Wonder Circus, and as proof, he returns Jumbo back to them. Together, all four of them perform.

== Cast ==
- Doris Day as Kitty Wonder
- Stephen Boyd as Sam Rawlins
  - Jimmy Joyce as Sam's singing voice
- Jimmy Durante as 'Pop' Wonder
- Martha Raye as Lulu
- Dean Jagger as John Noble
- Joseph Waring as Harry
- Lynn Wood as Tina
- Charles Watts as Ellis
- James Chandler as Parsons
- Robert Burton as Madison
- Wilson Wood as Hank
- Norman Leavitt as Eddie
- Grady Sutton as Driver
- Janos Prohaska as Circus Performer
- John Astin as Pilot (uncredited)
- Billy Barty as Joey the Circus Clown (uncredited)
- Chuck Haren as Lennie (uncredited)
- Paul Wexler as Sharpie (uncredited)
- Charlotte Austin as Child's Mother (uncredited)

== Production ==
MGM bought the rights to the musical soon after it reached the stage. In 1947, Charles Walters requested to direct the film, and the studio agreed. In 1950, it was announced Arthur Freed would produce and Howard Keel and Jimmy Durante would star. However, production was delayed for many years because of litigation.

Busby Berkeley emerged from retirement to work on the film, which was his last.

In May 1962, the film's cost was reported as $4.8 million.

== Soundtrack ==
A soundtrack album Billy Rose's Jumbo of the film was issued by Columbia Records in 1962.

== Reception ==
=== Box office ===
According to MGM's records, the film earned $2.5 million in the U.S. and Canada and $1.5 million in other markets, but because of its high cost, it recorded a loss of $3,956,000. It was the last film that producer Joe Pasternak made at MGM.

=== Critical reaction ===
Bosley Crowther of The New York Times called Billy Rose's Jumbo a "conspicuously elephantine show". He further wrote: "The only thing vastly wrong with Jumbo ... is that it is hitting the screen about 25 years late. The aura of wonder and excitement it tries to throw around old fashioned circus life, the sentiment it tries to squeeze and syphon out of an old-time circus manager, the sense of emotional exaltation it tries to pump into a dull tanbark romance—all are such stuff as was familiar in circus pictures that many years ago."

Time magazine praised Walters's direction, writing: "He skillfully mingles cinemagic and circus-pocus, and he almost always gets the best out of his players—including Jumbo, portrayed with massive aplomb by an animal named Sydney, who wears a size 92 top hat and, in profile, looks rather like Durante."

Variety praised the film, writing: "Now, some 27 years later, the showmanship of Metro has turned the combo musical into a great film entertainment with every prospect of big box office."

The film is recognized by the American Film Institute in the 2006: AFI's Greatest Movie Musicals – Nominated

== Home media ==
Billy Rose's Jumbo was released as a Region 1 DVD by Warner Bros. on April 26, 2005 and as part of Volumes 1 and 2 of The Doris Day Collection on April 10, 2007.
