= Image Union =

American independent documentary series

- Genre: Documentary
- Directed by: Miscellaneous
- Country of origin: United States
- Original language: English
- No. of series: 13
- No. of episodes: 417

Production
- Executive producer: Jamie Cesar
- Producer: Tom Weinberg
- Production locations: Chicago, IL
- Running time: 1 hour
- Production company: WTTW

Original release
- Release: 16 November 1978 – December 1999

Related
- The 90's

Image Union is an American independent documentary series created by Jamie Cesar and Tom Weinberg. It was aired on WTTW, a PBS affiliate in Chicago, Illinois and premiered on November 16, 1978. Each hour-long episode was either a "theme show" or a "potpourri" of work from different video makers and the segments were cut together with few transitions or announcer introductions. The show did not have an official end date and reruns regularly ran on WTTW up until the early 2010s.

== Background and overview ==
Prior to Image Union, WTTW aired Nightwatch with Gene Siskel, an all-night show featuring the work of independent producers with call-in audience participation. Siskel's hosting gradually took on the focus of the show and this led producers to feel that their work was being misrepresented or demeaned. These grievances reached their peak at a regional conference between independent producers and their local PBS stations, sponsored by NYC Global Village Video Center.

After WTTW president William J. McCarter finished his speech at the convention, the audience criticized him about Nightwatch for three-and-a-half hours. McCarter listened to the outcry and even scheduled a second meeting with the group. This ultimately led to the creation of Image Union under Tom Weinberg, who was "natural liaison" between the independent and corporate worlds, due to his background in the guerilla film movement. Weinberg was the coordinating producer who selected programs and post-production director. Jamie Cesar was the co-producer, who took over the show when Weinberg left later on to pursue other projects.

In comparison to Nightwatch, Image Union was committed to letting the videos speak. Editing was only done with the independent producers’ cooperation and there was no host to transition between the different clips. In example, the first episode of Image Union featured 11 different films and videotapes, ranging from Swiss and German television commercials to old videos of Mayor Daley, with small fillers sometimes separating them. It was intentionally unique, not expected on PBS and akin to an "art gallery context," as Chicago Reader wrote.

The first 100 programs consisted of more than 400 different segment from Chicago and national sources. The rates paid were $12 per aired minute and the creators had to sign release agreements for WTTW's three-year local rights. It was formatted with a 50:50 ratio for film and videotape. In terms of format, tapes were 3/4-inch cassettes that were time based and films were 16mm, but occasionally Super 8. Both formats were transferred to quad and edited to master quadtape.

It aired for 13 seasons.

== Reception and impact ==
In 1988, Image Union was celebrating its ten-year anniversary. In a feature by Chicago Reader, Weinberg stated that the show had been nominated for 11 Emmys but never won. It was one of the Top 10 WTTW programs and generated 80,000-150,000 viewers each episode.

The success of this show would later enable the WTTW television series The 90's, also produced by Tom Weinberg and very much in similar concept to Image Union.

== Episodes ==
=== Season 1 (1978-80) ===
The first season aired every Saturday at 10PM. It aired 52 weeks a year and had no outside funding as it was all WTTW.

No. overall	No. in season	Title	Original release date
1	1	"Episode NO. 1"	November 16, 1978
2	2	"Episode NO. 2"	November 30, 1978
3	3	"Episode NO. 3"	December 14, 1978
4	4	"Episode NO. 4"	December 28, 1978
5	5	"Episode NO. 5"	January 11, 1979
6	6	"Episode NO. 6"	January 25, 1979
7	7	"Episode NO. 7"	February 8, 1979
8	8	"Episode NO. 8"	February 22, 1979
9	9	"Episode NO. 9: Women"	March 8, 1979
10	10	"Episode NO. 10: Animation"	March 22, 1979
11	11	"Episode NO. 11"	April 5, 1979
12	12	"Episode NO. 12"	TBA
13	13	"Episode NO. 13: Composite"	April 8, 1979
14	14	"Episode NO. 14: Commercial World"	May 19, 1979
15	15	"Episode NO. 15"	TBA
16	16	"Episode NO. 16"	TBA
17	17	"Episode NO. 17"	June 2, 1979
18	18	"Episode NO. 18"	June 9, 1979
19	19	"Episode NO. 19"	June 16, 1979
20	20	"Episode NO. 20: Art & Beauty"	June 23, 1979
21	21	"Episode NO. 21"	June 30, 1979
22	22	"Episode NO. 22"	TBA
23	23	"Episode NO. 23"	TBA
24	24	"Episode NO. 24"	August 18, 1979
25	25	"Episode NO. 25"	August 25, 1979
26	26	"Episode NO. 26: Short Show"	September 1, 1979
27	27	"Episode NO. 27: Super 8's"	September 8, 1979
28	28	"Episode NO. 28: Municipal Mirth"	September 15, 1979
29	29	"Episode NO. 29"	September 29, 1979
30	30	"Episode NO. 30: 15 Min Show"	October 6, 1979
31	31	"Episode NO. 31"	October 13, 1979
32	32	"Episode NO. 32"	October 20, 1979
33	33	"Episode NO. 33"	October 27, 1979
34	34	"Episode NO. 34"	November 3, 1979
35	35	"Episode NO. 35: Alien Nation"	November 10, 1979
36	36	"Episode NO. 36"	November 17, 1979
37	37	"Episode NO. 37: Somersaulters and Aces"	December 1, 1979
38	38	"Episode NO. 38"	December 8, 1979
39	39	"Episode NO. 39"	December 15, 1979
40	40	"Episode NO. 40: Holiday Show"	December 22, 1979
41	41	"Episode NO. 41: The Caribbean Show"	January 5, 1980
42	42	"Episode NO. 42"	TBA
43	43	"Episode NO. 43: Modern Times"	January 12, 1980
44	44	"Episode NO. 44"	January 19, 1980
45	45	"Episode NO. 45"	TBA

=== Season 2 (1980) ===
No. overall	No. in season	Title	Original release date
46	1	"Episode NO. 201"	TBA
47	2	"Episode NO. 202"	TBA
48	3	"Episode NO. 203"	TBA
49	4	"Episode NO. 204: Yanomami"	January 19, 1980
50	5	"Episode NO. 205"	January 26, 1980
51	6	"Episode NO. 206"	February 9, 1980
52	7	"Episode NO. 207: The California View"	February 16, 1980
53	8	"Episode NO. 208"	TBA
54	9	"Episode NO. 209: Space And Video"	February 23, 1980
55	10	"Episode NO. 210"	March 1, 1980
56	11	"Episode NO. 211: REMAKE OF SHOW no. 1"	March 15, 1980
57	12	"Episode NO. 212: Cool Dreams"	March 29, 1980
58	13	"Episode NO. 213"	TBA
59	14	"Episode NO. 214: International Women’s Day"	March 8, 1980
60	15	"Episode NO. 215"	TBA
61	16	"Episode NO. 216"	TBA
62	17	"Episode NO. 217"	TBA
63	18	"Episode NO. 218: The Cost Of Cotton"	March 22, 1980
64	19	"Episode NO. 219"	TBA
65	20	"Episode NO. 220: Five Shorts"	July 12, 1980
66	21	"Episode NO. 221"	TBA
67	22	"Episode NO. 222: Art Institute Videos"	May 31, 1980
68	23	"Episode NO. 223: Bronx Baptism"	June 3, 1980
69	24	"Episode NO. 224"	TBA
70	25	"Episode NO. 225"	TBA
71	26	"Episode NO. 226"	TBA
72	27	"Episode NO. 227"	TBA
73	28	"Episode NO. 228"	TBA
74	29	"Episode NO. 229"	TBA
75	30	"Episode NO. 230: Four More Years"	June 28, 1980

=== Season 3 (1980-81) ===
No. overall	No. in season	Title	Original release date
76	1	"Episode NO. 301"	August 9, 1980
77	2	"Episode NO. 302"	August 9, 1980
78	3	"Episode NO. 303: BARTALK"	August 9, 1980
79	4	"Episode NO. 304"	August 30, 1980
80	5	"Episode NO. 305"	September 6, 1980
81	6	"Episode NO. 306"	September 13, 1980
82	7	"Episode NO. 307"	September 20, 1980
83	8	"Episode NO. 308"	October 4, 1980
84	9	"Episode NO. 309"	October 18, 1980
85	10	"Episode NO. 310"	October 25, 1980
86	11	"Episode NO. 311"	November 1, 1980
87	12	"Episode NO. 312"	November 8, 1980
88	13	"Episode NO. 313"	November 15, 1980
89	14	"Episode NO. 314"	November 22, 1980
90	15	"Episode NO. 315"	November 29, 1980
91	16	"Episode NO. 316: Say Day O"	December 6, 1980
92	17	"Episode NO. 317"	December 13, 1980
93	18	"Episode NO. 318"	December 17, 1980
94	19	"Episode NO. 319"	TBA
95	20	"Episode NO. 320"	TBA
96	21	"Episode NO. 321: Blue Monday"	January 19, 1981
97	22	"Episode NO. 322"	January 14, 1981
98	23	"Episode NO. 323"	TBA
99	24	"Episode NO. 324"	March 7, 1981
100	25	"Episode NO. 325"	March 14, 1981
101	26	"Episode NO. 326"	TBA
102	27	"Episode NO. 327"	TBA
103	28	"Episode NO. 328"	TBA
104	29	"Episode NO. 329: Short Pieces"	March 30, 1981
105	30	"Episode NO. 330"	June 27, 1981
106	31	"Episode NO. 331"	April 20, 1981
107	32	"Episode NO. 332"	TBA
108	33	"Episode NO. 333"	May 18, 1981
109	34	"Episode NO. 334"	TBA
110	35	"Episode NO. 335"	May 4, 1981
111	36	"Episode NO. 336"	TBA
112	37	"Episode NO. 337"	June 18, 1981
113	38	"Episode NO. 338"	TBA
114	39	"Episode NO. 339: Can't Take No More"	June 16, 1981
115	40	"Episode NO. 340"	June 15, 1981

=== Season 4 ===
No. overall	No. in season	Title	Original release date
116	1	"Episode NO. 401"	TBA
117	2	"Episode NO. 402"	TBA
118	3	"Episode NO. 403"	TBA
119	4	"Episode NO. 404"	August 24, 1981
120	5	"Episode NO. 405"	TBA
121	6	"Episode NO. 406"	TBA
122	7	"Episode NO. 407"	TBA
123	8	"Episode NO. 408"	TBA
124	9	"Episode NO. 409"	July 27, 1981
125	10	"Episode NO. 410"	TBA
126	11	"Episode NO. 411"	TBA
127	12	"Episode NO. 412"	August 24, 1981
128	13	"Episode NO. 413"	TBA
129	14	"Episode NO. 414"	September 2, 1980
130	15	"Episode NO. 415"	TBA
131	16	"Episode NO. 416: I'd Like to Hate Myself in the Morning"	September 8, 1981
132	17	"Episode NO. 417: Vietnam Vets"	October 2, 1981
133	18	"Episode NO. 418"	November 2, 1981
134	19	"Episode NO. 419"	November 2, 1981
135	20	"Episode NO. 420: Pandemonium"	November 6, 1981
136	21	"Episode NO. 421: Blue Monday (Stereo)"	November 18, 1981
137	22	"Episode NO. 422"	TBA
138	23	"Episode NO. 423"	TBA
139	24	"Episode NO. 424: Pass/Fail"	January 4, 1982
140	25	"Episode NO. 425: Lots of Little Ones"	January 21, 1982
141	26	"Episode NO. 426: Serbian/Steel"	January 25, 1982
142	27	"Episode NO. 427"	TBA
143	28	"Episode NO. 428: Love Tapes"	February 13, 1982
144	29	"Episode NO. 429: Music Video (Long Version)"	February 18, 1982
145	30	"Episode NO. 430: Inside Spring Training"	March 29, 1982
146	31	"Episode NO. 431"	TBA
147	32	"Episode NO. 432"	TBA
148	33	"Episode NO. 433"	May 3, 1982
149	34	"Episode NO. 434"	TBA
150	35	"Episode NO. 435: Cocaine Express"	May 20, 1982
151	36	"Episode NO. 436: Trinidad/Neighborhood"	May 17, 1982

=== Season 5 ===
No. overall	No. in season	Title	Original release date
152	1	"Episode NO. 501"	TBA
153	2	"Episode NO. 502: Sketches/DE"	June 14, 1982
154	3	"Episode NO. 503: Backabout/Family"	June 14, 1982
155	4	"Episode NO. 504: Writing/Rivers"	June 21, 1982
156	5	"Episode NO. 505"	TBA
157	6	"Episode NO. 506"	TBA
158	7	"Episode NO. 507: Pennylane/Alley"	July 19, 1982
159	8	"Episode NO. 508"	TBA
160	9	"Episode NO. 509: 5 Shorts"	August 30, 1982
161	10	"Episode NO. 510: Cleaning Lady/Music"	August 12, 1982
162	11	"Episode NO. 511: Full of Grace"	August 30, 1982
163	12	"Episode NO. 512: Nuclear Demo... plus 2"	August 30, 1982
164	13	"Episode NO. 513: Dance in Silence"	September 9, 1982
165	14	"Episode NO. 514: Days of Swine and Roses"	October 4, 1982
166	15	"Episode NO. 515"	TBA
167	16	"Episode NO. 516"	TBA
168	17	"Episode NO. 517"	October 18, 1982
169	18	"Episode NO. 518"	October 18, 1982
170	19	"Episode NO. 519: "A Hunger Artist""	November 1, 1982
171	20	"Episode NO. 520"	November 8, 1982
172	21	"Episode NO. 521: 3 Locals"	November 15, 1982
173	22	"Episode NO. 522"	TBA
174	23	"Episode NO. 523"	TBA
175	24	"Episode NO. 524: Death in the West"	January 22, 1983
176	25	"Episode NO. 525: Election Show 1983"	January 24, 1983
177	26	"Episode NO. 526"	TBA
178	27	"Episode NO. 527"	TBA
179	28	"Episode NO. 528: Commercialfest"	February 7, 1983
180	29	"Episode NO. 529"	TBA
181	30	"Episode NO. 530"	TBA
182	31	"Episode NO. 531"	TBA
183	32	"Episode NO. 532: Riverview Plus 2"	February 16, 1983
184	33	"Episode NO. 533: Steve Dahl in "FALKLANDS" & "ROOTBEER RAGS""	March 14, 1983
185	34	"Episode NO. 534"	TBA
186	35	"Episode NO. 535"	TBA
187	36	"Episode NO. 536"	TBA
188	37	"Episode NO. 537: Barking Geckos"	May 9, 1983

=== Season 6 ===
No. overall	No. in season	Title	Original release date
189	1	"Episode NO. 601: Petrified Man"	May 16, 1983
190	2	"Episode NO. 602"	TBA
191	3	"Episode NO. 603"	TBA
192	4	"Episode NO. 604: Shorties"	June 20, 1983
193	5	"Episode NO. 605"	TBA
194	6	"Episode NO. 606"	TBA
195	7	"Episode NO. 607"	TBA
196	8	"Episode NO. 608: "Mayoral Spots""	January 3, 1983
197	9	"Episode NO. 609: Chicago Stories"	September 6, 1983
198	10	"Episode NO. 610"	TBA
199	11	"Episode NO. 611: Trapped"	August 15, 1983
200	12	"Episode NO. 612"	TBA
201	13	"Episode NO. 613"	TBA
202	14	"Episode NO. 614"	TBA
203	15	"Episode NO. 615: Pop Goose"	October 17, 1983
204	16	"Episode NO. 616"	TBA
205	17	"Episode NO. 617"	TBA
206	18	"Episode NO. 618: Uptown Christian Soldiers"	November 14, 1983
207	19	"Episode NO. 619"	TBA
208	20	"Episode NO. 620: Las Vegas: Last Oasis in America"	November 21, 1983
209	21	"Episode NO. 621"	TBA
210	22	"Episode NO. 622"	TBA
211	23	"Episode NO. 623"	TBA
212	24	"Episode NO. 624"	TBA
213	25	"Episode NO. 625: Jamie Jam"	January 23, 1983
214	26	"Episode NO. 626: "Information Withheld""	January 9, 1984
215	27	"Episode NO. 627: "Public People""	January 23, 1984
216	28	"Episode NO. 628: Nicaragua"	March 5, 1984
217	29	"Episode NO. 629: The West Bank: Whose Promised Land?"	March 5, 1984
218	30	"Episode NO. 630: Commercials"	April 17, 1984
219	31	"Episode NO. 631"	March 6, 1984

=== Season 7 (1984-87) ===
No. overall	No. in season	Title	Original release date
220	1	"Episode NO. 701: Three Chicago Women"	July 11, 1984
229	10	"Episode NO. 710: Rock n’ Roll Disciples"	July 22, 1987
240	21	"NO. 721"	February 6, 1985
243	24	"Episode NO. 724: Commercialfest 1984"	February 21, 1985
247	28	"Episode NO. 728: Seven Short Works Outer Space: & Dogs"	April 2, 1985
248	29	"Episode NO. 729: Reclaiming America Plus 2"	April 9, 1985

=== Season 8 (1985-1986) ===
No. overall	No. in season	Title	Original release date
249	1	"Episode 801: Music Videos"	June 26, 1985
253	5	"Episode 805: Box of Treasures: Northwest Coast Indians"	July 24, 1985
260	12	"Episode 812: Animal Crackers"	October 1, 1985
262	14	"Episode 814: Disarmament Survey"	October 14, 1985
263	15	"Episode 815: AFI Excerpts, Prisoners, Life is a Saxophone. Passion"	October 29, 1985
266	18	"Episode 818: Song of Radauti"	November 26, 1985
267	19	"Episode 819: Xmas Show"	December 17, 1985
273	25	"Episode 825: WIDC 1986"	February 11, 1986
276	28	"Episode 828: Commercial Fest 1986"	March 27, 1986
277	29	"Episode 829: My Mother Married Wilbur Stump"	March 27, 1986

=== Season 9 (1986) ===
No. overall	No. in season	Title	Original release date
287	10	"Episode 910: Dan Dinello"	September 9, 1986
300	23	"Episode 923: 10 Shorts"	April 16, 1991

=== Season 10 (1987-88) ===
No. overall	No. in season	Title	Original release date
309	9	"Episode 1009: Aids: Question and Ans., Cocaine: An American Production"	July 28, 1987
323	23	"Episode 1023: Marilyn Monroe"	January 28, 1988
327	27	"Episode 1027: Women in the Director's Chair"	February 18, 1988
333	33	"Episode 1033: I Would Never Do That Again"	April 14, 1988

=== Season 11 (1989) ===
No. overall	No. in season	Title	Original release date
334	1	"Episode NO. 1101: Commercials '88 for '87"	April 21, 1988
335	2	"Episode NO. 1102: Impressions of Harold"	June 29, 1988
345	12	"Episode NO. 1112"	September 1, 1988
346	13	"Episode NO. 1113: Universal Hotel"	September 1, 1988
356	23	"Episode NO. 1123: Winter Shorts"	January 12, 1989
362	29	"Episode NO. 1129: Some Yellowstone Winter Sound"	June 29, 1988

=== Season 12 (1989-90) ===
No. overall	No. in season	Title	Original release date
363	5	"Episode NO. 1205: International Commercials"	June 27, 1989
381	23	"Episode NO. 1223: Women India"	February 25, 1992
382	24	"Episode NO. 1224: Panama A Just Cause?"	February 25, 1990

=== Season 13 (1990-91) ===
No. overall	No. in season	Title	Original release date
395	13	"Episode NO. 1313: Halloween Fright"	September 12, 1990
413	31	"Episode NO. 1331: Iowa and its Presidents"	April 16, 1991

=== Specials ===
No. overall	No. in season	Title	Original release date
414	N–A	"Image Union: All Night"	November 17, 1979
415	N–A	"Episode 1901: 1996 "Bob" Awards"	September 11, 1996
416	N–A	"Show 2116: The Other M.J."	February 1, 1999
417	N–A	"Image Union: An Extraordinary Joe"	December 1999
