= Wyoming Cowboy Hall of Fame =

Hall of fame for cowboys

- Established: 2013
- Location: PO Box 404, Saratoga, Wyoming 82331
- Type: Hall of fame
- Website: WCHF

The Wyoming Cowboy Hall of Fame is a cowboy hall of fame. Established in 2013, the Wyoming Cowboy Hall of Fame exists to enrich Wyoming's cowboy and ranch heritage through various means as it sees fit. Its main purpose in doing this is to recognize individuals in the state who established the first trails and brought this culture here.

== History ==
The inaugural class of inductees ceremony took place in Douglas, Wyoming, in the year 2014, the year the hall opened its doors. More than 500 people attended the event. Senator Mike Enzi, along with the Board of Directors, performed the induction procedure. "This event was really about celebrating the first class of individuals inducted into the Wyoming Cowboy Hall of Fame,” said Scott Ratliff, president of the Board. “It is about recognizing what cowboys stand for." Individuals inducted into the inaugural class included both living and non-living people. The hall of fame allows the board to recognize cowboys who might not otherwise be remembered. The hall of fame is an organization that took 15 years in the making. And as of yet, it only exists as a virtual museum.

== Inductees ==
2019 Inductees

- Arthur "Art" Bales
- Jesse "Jess" Barkhurst
- Robert "Bob" Beard
- Wells Beck
- Harry Aaron Borgialli
- Tom Borgialli
- William "Bill" Carr
- Joe Coykendall
- C.W. "Chuck" & Dick Curtis
- A. Wright Dickinson III
- Jack Finnerty
- William "Bill" Frank Sr. & William "Billy" Frank Jr.
- Joseph Brutus "Joe" Graham
- William "Bill" Hancock
- Glenn E Hanson
- Albert William "Bud" Huseman
- Rulan & Loal Jacobson
- Roy Jarrard
- Lora Reynolds Johnson
- Archie "Arch" Johnson
- Dan Kirkbride
- Bruce Laird
- Jerry Lanchbury
- Jeffery "Nate" & Jim Lupher
- Earl Marsh
- Peter McCulloch
- Gerald McInerney
- Paul "Blinky" Hamilton Miller
- Eugene Paul "Gene" Pearson Sr.
- Carlton Perry
- Georgia Platt
- James "Jim" Ramsay & Wanda Ramsay Walker
- Dale Robbins
- Norman Sanford
- Tom Schutte
- Warren Richard "Dick" Shaw
- William Elmer "Billy" Sherman
- Raymond "Ray" Smith
- Hugh & Mary Vass
- Gary Walker
- Byron E. Wollen

2018 Inductees

- Leland Ward “Buck” Alameda
- Lawrence Atkinson
- B.B. Brooks/McCleary Family
- Kenny “KB” Ballard
- Bernard “Bear Tracks” Betz
- John “Charley” Borgialli
- John E. “Jack” Brodie
- Joseph “Joe” Black Chrisman
- Charlie “Chaz” Cook
- Oley Darlington
- Albert Jerome “Stub” Farlow
- John “Jack” Fitzhugh
- Afton D. “Babe” Green Jr.
- Gene Griffis
- Curtis “Ray” Hammond
- Earl Hardeman
- Harold Harvey
- Mike Henry
- Joe Hickey
- Richard Duane “Dick” Jarrard
- Carl Johnson
- Lonnie “Nav” Mantle
- John “Mexican John” Marroquin
- Frank Lee Martinez
- Morris McCarty
- Eldon “Pete” McKee
- Charles Powers “Charley” Noble
- Francis “Bud” Orton
- Stanley “Henry” Pennoyer
- Harry Harriman (H.H.) “Jim” Price
- Louis “Louie” Rankine
- Clark Leroy “Clarkie” Reynolds
- Donald “Donny” Robbins
- Donald K. “Bill” Scott
- Charles “Charlie” Shaffer
- Frank Shepperson
- Stewart “Sturdy” Sides Jr.
- Sidney Ross “Sid” Skiver
- Harold “Smitty” Smith
- Ronald “Ron” Stoltenberg
- Mary A. “Mickey” Thoman
- Raymond “Ray” Waliser
- Elbert and Hazel Walker
- John Norman Wallingford
- Wales Wenburg
- William C. “Chuck” Wilkinson
- Jesse York

2017 Inductees

- James “Jim” Atkinson
- Richard T. “Bucky” Barnette
- James “Bill” Beard
- Don “Reckless Red” Bell
- Louis D. “Louie” Boles
- Ernest Nathan “Nate” Brown
- Joe W. “J.W.” Buckhaults
- Murray Butler
- Donald “Dee” Clark
- John G. “Jack” Corbett
- Carl Obe Dockery
- Charles Dunning
- Edwin “Eddie” Dvarishkis
- Percy Edwards
- Church Hill Firnekas
- Joseph Stephen “Joe” Fordyce
- George Earl “Rasty” Givens
- Jack Graves
- William Shaw “Bill” Gray
- William “Bill” Greer
- Jimmie & Gloria Grieve
- Robert “Bob” Isenberger
- Albert D. “Bert” Johnson
- Dail Knori
- Frank “Judge” Lilley
- Robert “Bob” Lozier
- Abner Luman
- Hugh “Hughie” Maller
- Lewis “Junior” Martin
- J. William “Bill” Martin
- Walter C. “Buster” McIlvain
- Cecil Vaughn McMillin
- James Oscar “Jim” Middleton
- James Henry “Hank” Miles
- Otto Arthur Herman Miller
- Arthur Lesie “Art” Montgomery
- Howard Paul “Red” Peterson
- Ray Duane Rice
- Benjamin “Ben” Roberts
- Alden C. Robinson
- Harold Scott
- Floyd “Hawk” Shaffer
- Robert L. “Bob” Snyder
- Wes Taylor
- George Donald “Powder River” Thompson
- Billy Wilkinson

2016 Inductees

- William C. "Bill" Brewer
- Robert "Bob" Brislawn
- Max Burch
- Ralph Joseph "Joe" Campbell
- Charles "Chipper" Chatfield
- James H. “Jim” Cheney
- Robert “Bob” DeVeny
- Robert Bertram “Bob” Dixon
- John “Swede” Ellis
- Merrill Farthing
- Walter “Walt” Feuz
- John W. “Johnny” Greet
- Rob Roy McGregor Hamilton
- Robert “Bert” Harvey
- Eugene Hickey
- Mary Frances Tisdale “Mike” Hinckley
- Jelmer Edward Johnson
- Frank & Ernest Johnson
- Alex “Junior” Johnstone, Jr.
- Cherry Jones
- John Keller
- Randall “Randy” Kruger
- Robert Lester “Bob” Leath
- Ernest Leitner
- Leondro “Lee” Martinez
- Dub McQueen
- Ira & Edna McWilliams
- John “Jay” Moody
- Walter “Spud” Murphy
- James “Jim” Nelson
- James John “Jim” Ogg
- Luther Lurton “Lute” Penfield
- Calvin Dee Potter, Sr.
- Jack Reisch
- Thomas Anthony “Tuff” Renner
- Norm Richie
- Murl Jay Robbins
- Frank Benjamin “Wild Horse” Robbins
- Willis “Bill” Ruby
- John S. “Jack” Runner
- Stanford “Stan” Sanford
- Charles A. “Chuck” Sanger
- Carl Schweighart
- Roscoe Newton “Peach” Shaw
- John H. “Jack” Simpson
- Christy Knut Smith
- James “Jim” Stoll
- John C. “Johnny” Streeter
- John & Juanita “Neats” Sussex
- Eugene (Gene) “Curly” Williams*

2015 Inductees

- Martin "Mart" Aimone
- James “Buck” Allemand
- John Bell
- Charles Alexander Blackstone
- Lloyd Cain
- Earl F. “Earlie” Camblin
- Roger Joe “Rog” Claytor
- Charles Powell “Powd” Clemmons
- William B. “Bill” Coy
- Robert L. Crisp
- George Harry Cross
- Honey DeFord
- Elza “Elzy” Eversole
- Rogelio “Roger” Fernandez
- Gary Lee Frank
- Robert Marshall “Bob” Gibbs
- Norris Graves
- Bill & Billie Hackett
- Lyman A. Harmon
- George Hereford
- Ivan “Ike” Herold
- Robert Garnet “Bob” Hladky
- Charles “Harold” Jarrard
- Dennis “Denny” Jones
- Charles P. “Chas” Kane
- Francis A. Kolego
- William H. “Bill” Kruse
- H. Curtis & Ralph C. Larsen
- Roy Elsworth Martin
- Irma Williams Hancock McGuire
- Bill McKee
- James I. Newland
- Gerald LeRoy “Perk” Perkins
- Burl Potter
- William “4W Bill” Pressler
- Charles R. Rankin
- James Newell “Jimmie” Robbins
- William Dale “Bill” Saunders
- Ralph Schuppan
- Alfred F. “Al” Scoon
- William A. “Bill” Scoon
- Leonard Thompson “Bus” Sedgwick
- Eddie & Peggy Shaffer
- Laddie Guy “Lad” Smith
- Harve H. “Slim” Stone
- William Byron “By” Titensor
- Glen T. Wadsworth
- Leonard “Len” Walker
- John Mercer Weintz
- Charles J. “Chuck” Williams
- Darrell Winfield

2014 Inductees

- Tim Barkhurst
- Billie Jean Shepperson Beaton
- Paul Bruegman
- Edwin Earl “Cam” Camblin
- Frank N. "Fearless" Carroll
- Nate Champion
- John Charles “Jack” Esau
- Charles A. “Chuck” Fenton
- John Robert “Cub” Forbes
- Ron Garretson
- Les Gore
- Robert Mills “Bob” Grant
- James Clay “Jim” Hageman
- Jack Hickey
- Guy Holt
- Richard Quay “Dick” Hornbuckle
- Raymond D. Hutson
- James Edward “Jamis” Johnson
- William B. “Will” Jones
- Robert W. “Bob” Manning
- Joseph Michael Maycock
- Ben C. “Benny” Reynolds
- Charles “Ellis” Reynolds
- Frank Rhodes
- J. Ralph “Scotty” Scott
- Anthony Wilkinson “Andy” Sedgwick
- Bill “Cody Bill” Smith
- Howard Wesley “Jack” Sipe, Sr.
- Rhea “Bud” Tillard
- Joseph “Rex” Wardell
- Cecil “Ray” Weber
- Slim Whitt
- Wilkson Brothers - Anthony & John
