= Tribulation 99: Alien Anomalies Under America =

- Directed by: Craig Baldwin
- Written by: Craig Baldwin
- Narrated by: Sean Kilcoyne
- Cinematography: Bill Daniel
- Edited by: Craig Baldwin
- Music by: Dana Hoover
- Distributed by: Drift Distribution
- Release date: 1991
- Running time: 48 minutes
- Country: United States
- Language: English

Tribulation 99: Alien Anomalies Under America is a 1991 science fiction collage film directed by Craig Baldwin. The film presents a chronicle of U.S. involvement in Latin America through a pseudo-documentary about an alien invasion.

== Plot ==
An alien race called the Quetzals flee the destruction of the solar system's tenth planet and find shelter on Earth, hidden under the South Pole. They construct underground cities out of their own excrement, with large networks of caves reaching up to humans' water and sewage systems. When the United States begins nuclear weapons tests in the 1940s, the Quetzals prepare a counterattack. They use their telepathic powers to distort Earth's culture, sowing hatred and violence, and they infiltrate human society with human replicants.

This causes many of the crises of the twentieth century—political assassinations, civil wars growing out of the Cold War, and economic collapses under neoliberal austerity. Harry S. Truman establishes the Central Intelligence Agency to wage a secret war against the Quetzals. The CIA mounts plots against various replicants in Latin America—Jacobo Árbenz in Guatemala, Fidel Castro in Cuba, and Salvador Allende in Chile. The Quetzals retaliate by assassinating John F. Kennedy and infiltrating the Democratic Party. The secret war escalates, and the Panama Canal is flooded with radioactive waste, melting the polar ice caps and flooding the entire planet. A small group of the political elite board spaceships to escape Earth. From space, they rejoice in the planet's destruction.

== Production ==
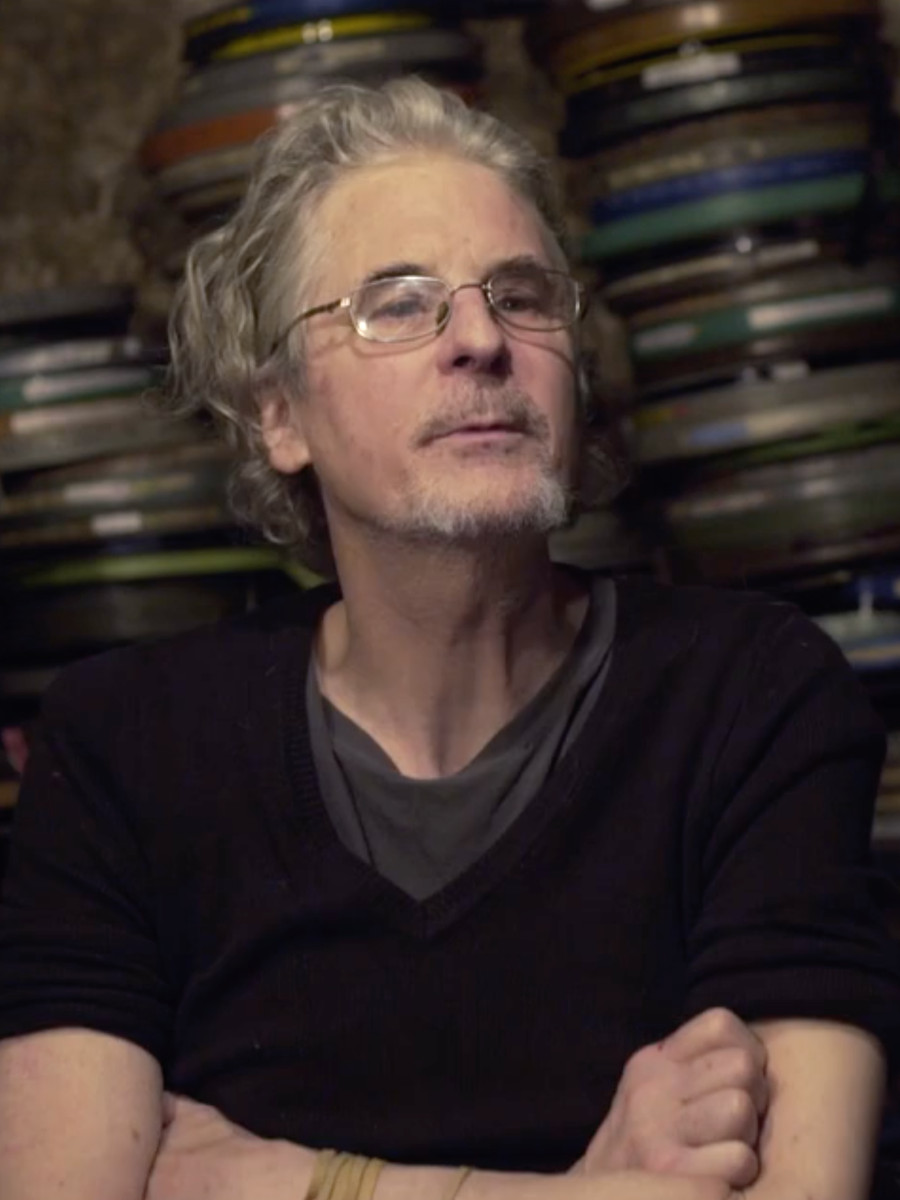
Director Craig Baldwin with his collection of films in 2015

Having worked with the El Salvador Film and Video Projects, Baldwin was interested in solidarity movements happening throughout Latin America. Reading articles about covert operations by the CIA in the CovertAction Information Bulletin, Baldwin thought that "these guys are like scriptwriters working for me…all I've got to do is put it in this movie, people will not believe it." The premise for Tribulation 99 was influenced by the 1970 documentary Chariots of the Gods, which speculated that aliens interacted with humans in visits to Earth long ago.

During the 1980s and 1990s, Baldwin built a large collection of thousands of film works, many of which were discarded by institutions changing to VHS. Material for Tribulation 99 was drawn from this archive of found footage. Instead of building the film around a prepared script, Baldwin edited works from the archive to imply connections and form a story. He enlisted local actor Sean Kilcoyne to do the film's narration, which Kilcoyne performed in an exaggerated form of journalese.

== Themes ==
Tribulation 99 draws from many existing conspiracy theories, such as UFOs, the hollow Earth, and the assassination of John F. Kennedy. It plays on the idea of alien invasion to describe not just attack by extraterrestrials, but also the history of American imperialism in Latin America. Baldwin explained that when the story's literal meaning is "read backward, so to speak, through a mirror, the truth would emerge."

In this way, the film bypasses the didacticism of other kinds of documentary focused on consciousness raising, and it often strikes a comedic tone. Rather than critiquing the ideological distortion of his source material to allow an authentic history to emerge, Baldwin reconstructs them as part of a new narrative. This montage strategy disputes the idea that a historical reality is contained in the images and positions history as a site where multiple ideological narratives compete for dominance.

== Release ==
Tribulation 99 was chosen for distribution by Drift Distribution. After its 1991 release, Ediciones la Calavera published a novelization of the film that November. It contained text and stills from the film. Tribulation 99 was selected for the 1992 San Francisco International Film Festival. It was later released on DVD with two of Baldwin's earlier shorts, Wild Gunman and RocketKitKongoKit.

=== Critical reception ===
J. Hoberman championed the film in a review for The Village Voice, describing it as "at once a sci-fi cheapster, a skewed history of U.S. intervention in Latin America, a satire of conspiratorial thinking, and an essential piece of current Americana". Manohla Dargis described the film as "a vertiginous expression of every bloody footnote to the Monroe Doctrine, cocooned in paranoid fantasies," and likened its frantic editing to the work of Bruce Conner. Dennis Harvey of Variety called it "a hilarious and bizarrely absorbing collage…coherent enough to avoid strictly experimental appeal." In his review for PopMatters, Keith McCrea wrote that "Baldwin manages to confuse, amuse, and inform without seeming arch or heavy-handed" and added that the film's rapid pace allows it to "[avoid] being smug while driving the point home relentlessly."

In 1999 cinema scholar Catherine Russell critiqued Baldwin's film as, "cut off from the historical real," however in a 2003 analysis and lengthy rebuttal to Russell published in The Moving Image: The Journal of the Association of Moving Image Archivists, Michael Zyrd sees the work's ironic voice and paranoid tone of narration as 'real' insofar as they, "mimic the image saturation and chaos of contemporary media culture itself."
