= Death in the West =

- Directed by: Martin Smith
- Release date: 1976
- Running time: 32 minutes
- Country: United Kingdom
- Language: English

Death in the West is a 1976 documentary film directed by Martin Smith, which is believed to contain the first recorded admission from a tobacco company representative that smoking causes health problems.

It was filmed by reporter Peter Taylor alongside a team from the United Kingdom current affairs program This Week. The film aired only once in the UK, from London in September 1976 on Thames Television, to an audience of approximately 12 million viewers, before a court order was obtained preventing it from being re-aired.

== Content ==
The film is composed of three different kinds of footage: old Marlboro commercials, interviews with two Philip Morris executives, and interviews with six American cowboys who have either lung cancer or emphysema, alongside testimony from physicians that the conditions were caused by heavy cigarette use.

The film interviews James Bowling, senior vice president and director of corporate affairs for Philip Morris, as well as Helmut Wakeham, vice-president for the company's USA science and technology department. The interview with Wakeham is believed to be the first recorded admission from a tobacco company representative that smoking causes health problems.

Yeah, cigarettes are [...] So what are we to do, stop living? The best way to avoid dying is not to be born you know. And if one avoided doing all the things which are alleged to be harmful to people these days we would vegetate in a mountain cave.

— Helmut Wakeham (Philip Morris USA) responding to being questioned if cigarettes are unhealthy

Wakeham was also criticised for comparing the ill-effects of smoking to overconsumption of apple sauce.

== Lawsuit ==
Shortly after the film aired, Philip Morris sued Thames Television, successfully obtaining a court order to prevent the film from being shown until its suit could be heard and preventing the filmmakers from publicly discussing the film. Philip Morris' suit accused Thames of both deception and breach of copyright, stating the firm was "sandbagged and double-crossed" into allowing Marlboro commercials to be used in the film, as they thought the film would depict cigarettes in a more favourable manner. Both Mother Jones magazine and The Glasgow Herald doubted this claim, since Peter Taylor had previously made three films for television which portrayed cigarette use in a negative manner. Philip Morris also spent "considerable money" in an attempt to prove the six individuals in the film were not genuine cowboys.

"They sent a couple of lawyers from Kansas City to see me. They just showed up on my doorstep [...] They wanted to prove that maybe other things than cigarettes had caused my emphysema. They were very sly in their questions. [...] They wanted to know how long I had been in the cattle business, was it my vocation or avocation? I've had this ranch 20 years, but they tried to make a big thing of the fact that some of that time I was also teaching school."

— John Holmes, cowboy who was interviewed in the film

Palmer Williams, then senior producer for 60 Minutes in the US, had expressed interest in airing part of the documentary, and the American Cancer Society had plans to use the film in their anti-smoking campaigns. The court order, however, prevented Thames from selling them the film.

Philip Morris stated they would settle out of court, if Thames returned all the footage of the commercials and Phillip Morris employees, thereby effectively destroying the majority of the film. Although Thames' chances of winning the lawsuit were described as good, the filmmakers did not mount a lawsuit to recover the film, as a defence was estimated to cost £100,000, far greater than the amount of money the company could make by recovering and selling the film. Thames eventually settled out of court, signing a confidential agreement that stated they would destroy all their copies of the film. In January 1979, the original film was reported to be sealed in a London court vault.

== Aftermath ==
By January 1979, four of the six cowboys interviewed in the film had died; only one was still alive in 1982. James Bowling died of pancreatic cancer in 1997.

Despite Thames' having agreed to destroy all copies of the film, both the film and photocopies of the confidential agreement leaked out. Stanton Glantz of the University of California obtained an unlicensed copy, which he screened at a public seminar in May 1982. He also gave a copy to San Francisco TV station KRON-TV, which also aired it that month. The film was also shown twice during the penultimate weekend of January 1983 on Chicago's WTTW as an installment of Image Union.

== See also ==
- Marlboro Man
