= Robert C. Norris =

American rancher (1929–2019)

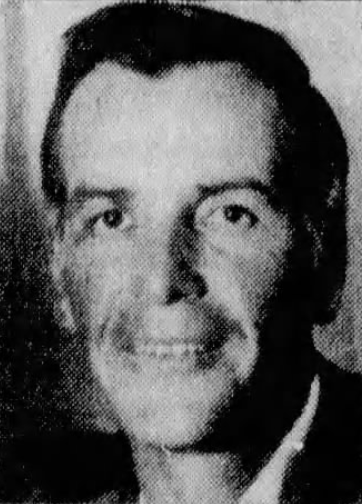
- Norris in 1987
- Born: April 10, 1929; Chicago, Illinois, U.S.
- Died: November 3, 2019 (aged 90); Colorado Springs, Colorado, U.S.
- Education: University of Kentucky
- Occupation: Rancher

Robert C. Norris (April 10, 1929 – November 3, 2019), also known as Bob Norris, was an American rancher. He was perhaps best known for playing the Marlboro Man in numerous Marlboro television commercials.

== Life and career ==
Norris was born in Chicago. He attended the University of Kentucky, majoring in agriculture. He was a rancher.

In the 1950s, Norris played the Marlboro Man in numerous Marlboro television commercials despite the fact he never smoked.

Norris was president of the American Quarter Horse Association during the 1980s.

Norris died on November 3, 2019, in Colorado Springs, Colorado, at the age of 90.
