= The 90's (TV series) =

- Genre: Documentary
- Directed by: Miscellaneous
- Country of origin: United States
- Original language: English
- No. of series: 4
- No. of episodes: 52

Production
- Executive producer: Tom Weinberg
- Producer: Joel Cohen
- Production locations: Chicago, IL
- Running time: 1 hour
- Production company: Fund for Innovative TV

Original release
- Release: 25 June 1989 – October 1992

The 90's is an American independent documentary television series created by Tom Weinberg and Joel Cohen that ran for four years on Public Broadcasting Service (PBS). It premiered on June 25, 1989. The show generated an audience of 25 million and PBS aired it on 160 stations at its national, prime-time peak. Throughout its run, it received praise from outlets across the nation and Billboard described it as "All the things Television was born to do but never does." The show included politics, talk segments, and interviews. Each hour-long episode featured the work of dozens of different independent video producers who mailed tapes for submission, as well as the work of about a dozen "camcorder correspondents" working under contract for the show. It came to an end in 1992.

== Background ==
The 90's can be seen as a continuation of the 1978 series Image Union, also produced by Tom Weinberg and aired on WTTW. With new technology opening up video for the masses, Weinberg and the broadcasting channel felt it was necessary to broadcast independent producers and their unfiltered views, or "real perspectives on real life." Similar to Image Union, The 90's was made up of these compiled clips and submissions, and had no host or narrators, only transitioning between clips with title cards or the occasional voice over by Weinberg. The largest difference between the shows was that Image Union was local, while The 90's had a more national focus and broadcast. In addition, it had video correspondents (6 or 7) in charge of creating and soliciting video content.

Although the earlier episodes were made of videos from people Weinberg and Cohen knew, as the series aired, they received more national and global submissions. To foster this environment, Weinberg and Cohen emphasized for their producers to not get in the way of the content, in order to truly let audiences make their own judgements. For contributors, the incentive besides exposure was a payment of $125 per minute aired.

The series was funded by the John D. and Catherine T. MacArthur Foundation, Corporation for Public Broadcasting, PBS Program Fund, Rockefeller Foundation and Instructional Telecommunications Fund (which later became "Free Speech TV" and Voqal TV).

== Edited episode ==
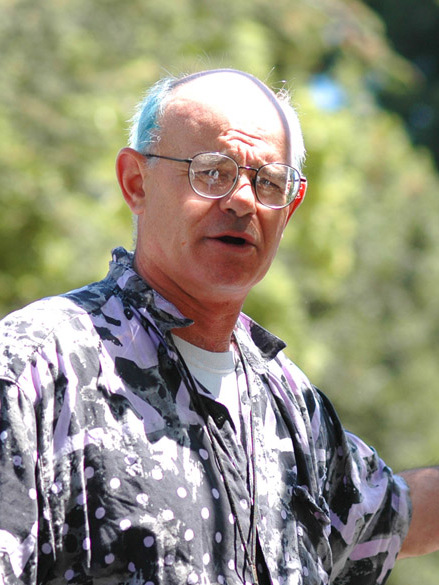
Stoney Burke

In 1992, there was controversy when an episode of The 90's was edited for content by WTTW. KBDI had access to both unedited and edited version, and opted to broadcast the original. KDBI general manager Ted Krichels said of the show: "It is outrageous and off-the-wall some of the time, and if anybody expects it to be some sort of safe show they've got the wrong program. I think what's happening generally is a lot of people are just politically paranoid, and PBS gets funding from government agencies, and it's all political." Chicago Reader wrote that if Tom Weinberg had refused these changes, "WTTW would have disowned the show and very few PBS stations would ever have carried it."

Specifically, Chicago video producer Bob Hercules had directed Stoney Burke, a San Francisco-based political satirist, to do street interviews at the 1992 Republican Convention. While some of Burke's interviews made the final cut, WTTW had removed his interactions with figures like housing secretary Jack Kemp, Senator Alfonse D'Amato, and Oliver North. This was publicized by text in Chicago Reader instead, which showed how Burke was pushing Kemp on vacant public housing and homelessness in Detroit, inflaming D'Amato about his "high-priced" politician status, and challenging North about his role in the CIA's involvement in Nicaragua.

In the Chicago Reader, Bob Hercules was quoted as stating that he considered the matter censorship by WTTW. Hercules suggested that it occurred because of backlash to Channel 11 by the religious right and figures including Jesse Helms and Bob Dole.

WTTW's Bruce Marcus, senior vice president for marketing and communications, justified the changes on the principle of "balance", stating that Hercules' coverage was biased in comparison to what was done by the show for the 1992 Democratic Convention. In comparison, fellow The 90's video producer Scott Jacobs opted for a fly-on-the-wall method to document the activities of John Hart, a leader of the Bill Clinton campaign.

== Reception ==
The first season of The 90's aired in 1989 on two PBS affiliates, KBDI-TV in Denver, Colorado and WTTW in Chicago, Illinois. A year after its first broadcast, in July 1990, The 90's had won a $350,000 grant, designated for prime-time broadcasting. In 1990, the show had already entered its second season and was now being broadcast at 90 stations, "including nine of the top ten markets among PBS affiliates."

In 1991, The 90's joined PBS's national prime-time lineup and it aired its third season every Tuesday on its peak of 160 stations. In September 1991, it also became available on video/VHS tape. The third and fourth season were funded by the $350,000 grant.

For the nine-episode fourth season in 1992, Tom Weinberg had hopes of expanding it into "as many as 11 episodes with a cost of $1.1 million", Current Public Telecommunications Review wrote. The 90's was widely praised at this point. It was reviewed positively by publications like the Los Angeles Times, Daily Herald, Billboard, Camcorder Magazine, Chicago Tribune, The Arizona Republic, The Washington Post, NPR, The Village Voice, North Carolina Airwaves, Minneapolis Star Tribune, Chicago Sun-Times, LA Daily News, The Denver Post, Milwaukee Sentinel, New York Times.

Chicago Reader was skeptical about the show's potential for success and wrote in 1992, "it's hard to imagine—a commercial network being built around [this] program." One reason given was the show's topics, such as an episode about marijuana and its legalization. The Chicago Sun-Times wrote that another episode stood out for its "obvious anti-war slant" and "disturbing... collage of comments and images" in addition to its Memorial Day airdate across 257 PBS stations.

== Cancellation ==
The show ended after 51 episodes, in 1992, when PBS chose not to renew funding. Tom Weinberg and Joel Cohen stated in an interview that the cancellation was likely caused by PBS being afraid of losing funding from CPB as a result of the show, as CPB was funded by Congress and had its Republican members targeted in the Convention episode.

== Episodes ==
The show's episodes were preserved by Media Burn Archive. The preservation and digitization of the collection was made possible from a $79,000 grant from the “Save America’s Treasures” program of the National Endowment for the Humanities in 2011.

=== Season 1 (1989) ===
The title card for the 90's pilot

The pilot of the show was aired in June, 1989. The show was picked up by three stations — KBDI-TV in Colorado, WTTW in Illinois, and a West Virginian station — and was aired every Sunday. KBDI-TV was the presenting station.

The MacArthur Foundation funded the first season's 13 episodes.

No. overall	No. in season	Title	Original release date
1	1	"The 90's: Pilot"	June 25, 1989
2	2	"Episode 101"	July 2, 1989
3	3	"Episode 102"	July 9, 1989
4	4	"Episode 103"	July 16, 1989
5	5	"Episode 104"	July 23, 1989
6	6	"Episode 105"	July 30, 1989
7	7	"Episode 106"	August 6, 1989
8	8	"Episode 107"	August 13, 1989
9	9	"Episode 108"	August 20, 1989
10	10	"Episode 109"	August 27, 1989
11	11	"Episode 110"	September 3, 1989
12	12	"Episode 111"	September 10, 1989
13	13	"Episode 112"	September 17, 1989
14	14	"Episode 113"	September 24, 1989

=== Season 2 (1990) ===
Season 2 was on 90 stations and aired between 10 PM to 12 AM on Saturdays.

No. overall	No. in season	Title	Original release date
15	1	"Episode 201: TV Culture And How It Affects World Views"	February 3, 1990
16	2	"Episode 202: How We Get Around (a.k.a. The Taxi Show)"	February 10, 1990
17	3	"Episode 203: The weed episode"	February 17, 1990
18	4	"Episode 204: Around The World And On The Edge"	February 24, 1990
19	5	"Episode 205: Architecture and Design"	March 3, 1990
20	6	"Episode 206: The Earth and The Environment"	March 10, 1990
21	7	"Episode 207: Focus on Spirituality"	March 17, 1990
22	8	"Episode 208: Relationships, Sexuality, And Some Revolutionary Ideas"	March 24, 1990
23	9	"Episode 209: Kids, Schools, And Learning"	March 31, 1990
24	10	"Episode 210: Love and Caring, Children of War"	April 7, 1990
25	11	"Episode 211: Everyday Addictions: Alcohol and Nicotine"	April 14, 1990
26	12	"Episode 212: An Impressionistic View Of Life In Japan"	April 21, 1990
27	13	"Episode 213: Fun and Games"	April 28, 1990
28	14	"Episode 214: The Environment and Our Oceans"	May 5, 1990
29	15	"Episode 215: The Video Revolution"	May 12, 1990
30	16	"Episode 216: Invasions and Revolutions"	May 19, 1990
31	17	"Episode 217: Life in the Grey Areas"	May 26, 1990
32	18	"Episode 218: Global Warring"	June 2, 1990
33	19	"Episode 219: Love, Marriage, And What Follows"	June 9, 1990

=== Season 3 (1991) ===
Season 3 aired every Tuesday.

No. overall	No. in season	Title	Original release date	Production Date
34	1	"Episode 301: Money, Money, Money"	April 9, 1991	March 14, 1991
35	2	"Episode 302: It's Only TV"	April 16, 1991	February 28, 1991
36	3	"Episode 303: Bartalk"	April 23, 1991	March 7, 1991
37	4	"Episode 304: You Are What You Eat"	April 30, 1991	
38	5	"Episode 305: America: Life, Liberty, And…"	May 7, 1991	April 10, 1991
39	6	"Episode 306: Race And Racism – Red, White, And Black"	May 14, 1991	April 19, 1991
40	7	"Episode 307: Video Kids"	May 21, 1991	
41	8	"Episode 308: The Anti-War Tapes"	May 28, 1991	May 3, 1991
42	9	"Episode 309: The Streets: Music And People"	June 4, 1991	May 10, 1991
43	10	"Episode 310: Prisoners: Rights and Wrongs"	June 11, 1991	May 20, 1991

=== Season 4 (1991-92) ===
Season 4 aired every Friday.

No. overall	No. in season	Title	Original release date	Production Date
44	1	"Episode 401: Taking Chances"	January 24, 1991	December 10, 1991
45	2	"Episode 402: Getting Older"	January 31, 1991	December 19, 1991
46	3	"Episode 403: Guns and Violence"	TBA	January 7, 1992
47	4	"Episode 404: Country Living"	TBA	January 19, 1992
48	5	"Episode 405: It's A Mall, Mall World"	TBA	January 28, 1992
49	6	"Episode 406: The American Way"	TBA	February 7, 1992
50	7	"Election Special: The Primary"	April 1, 1992	March 26, 1992
51	8	"Election Special: The Convention (Producers' cut)"	TBA	September 16, 1992
51	8	"Election Special: The Convention (PBS cut)"	TBA	September 24, 1992
52	9	"Election Special: It's Debate-able"	TBA	TBA

=== 25th Anniversary Special ===
In 2015, Media Burn Archive produced a series of videos to celebrate The 90's 25th anniversary, which were presented on Media Burn's website and YouTube channel. The categories were Global 90's, 90's Characters, 90's People, First Reality TV, Election Specials, and The Media.

== See also ==
- Image Union (1978-1991)
- Vanguard (2008-2013)
- Fault Lines (2009-2018)
