= Marlboro Man =

Cigarette advertising icon

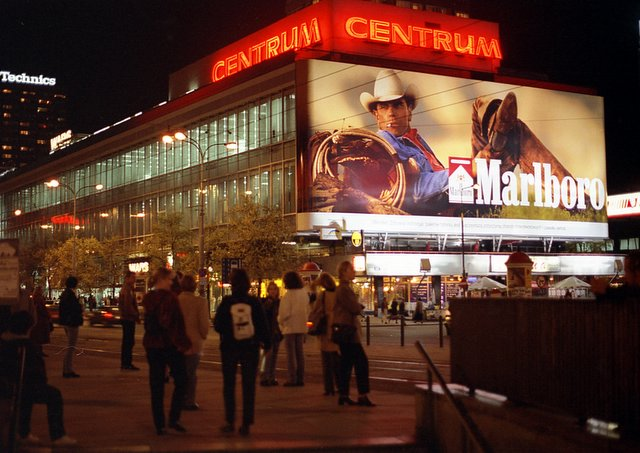
- A Marlboro Man advertisement on a Warsaw building in 2000
- First appearance: 1954; 72 years ago
- Last appearance: 2000; 26 years ago
- Created by: Leo Burnett Worldwide

The Marlboro Man is a figure that was used in tobacco advertising campaigns for Marlboro cigarettes. In the United States, where the campaign originated, it was used from 1954 to 1999. The Marlboro Man was first conceived by advertising executive Leo Burnett in 1954. The images initially featured rugged men portrayed in a variety of roles but later primarily featured a rugged cowboy or cowboys in picturesque wild terrain. (Note: Not always smoking or holding a cigarette, sometimes the cowboy was just a small silhouette in a large landscape, but the brand name or an image of a packet of the product was always shown in large size) The ads were originally conceived as a way to popularize filtered cigarettes, which at the time were considered feminine.

The campaign, created by Leo Burnett Worldwide, is said to be one of the most brilliant advertisement campaigns of all time. It transformed a feminine brand carrying the slogan "Mild as May" into a masculine one in a matter of months. Ellen Merlo, the vice president of marketing services at Philip Morris, was quoted in a 1989 Marlboro advertisement: "We perceive Formula One and Indy car racing as adding, if you will, a modern-day dimension to the Marlboro Man. The image of Marlboro is very rugged, individualistic, heroic. And so is this style of auto racing. From an image standpoint, the fit is good."

Cowboys proved to be popular, which led to the "Marlboro Cowboy" and "Marlboro Country" campaigns.

== Origins ==
Philip Morris & Co. (now Altria) originally introduced the Marlboro brand as a woman's cigarette in 1924. Starting in the early 1950s, the cigarette industry began to focus on promoting filtered cigarettes as a response to the emerging scientific data about harmful effects of smoking. Under the notion that filtered cigarettes were safer, Marlboro, as well as other brands, started to be sold with filters. However, filtered cigarettes, and Marlboro in particular, were considered women's cigarettes. During market research in the 1950s, men indicated that while they would consider switching to a filtered cigarette, they were concerned about being seen smoking a cigarette marketed to women.

The repositioning of Marlboro as a men's cigarette was handled by Chicago advertiser Leo Burnett. Most filtered cigarette advertising sought to make claims about the technology behind the filter: Through the use of complex terminology and scientific claims regarding the filter, the cigarette industry wanted to ease fears about the harmful effects of cigarette smoking. However, Leo Burnett decided to address these fears through an entirely different approach: creating ads completely devoid of health concerns or health claims of the filtered cigarette. Burnett felt that making claims about the effectiveness of filters furthered concerns of smoking's long-term effects.

The proposed campaign was to use manly figures: sea captains, weightlifters, war correspondents, construction workers, etc. The cowboy was to have been the first in this series. Burnett's inspiration for the exceedingly masculine "Marlboro Man" icon came from a 1949 issue of Life magazine featuring a photo of, and story about, Texas cowboy Clarence Hailey Long Jr. Within a year, Marlboro grew from a minor brand to the fourth best-selling brand in America, convincing Philip Morris to solely use the cowboy.

In late 1963, the campaign was revamped. Starting with Carl 'Big-un' Bradley, the actors who played the Marlboro Man were working cowboys, rodeo riders, and stuntmen, and the theme became that of The Magnificent Seven, composed by Elmer Bernstein. Another early real cowboy model was Max Bryan "Turk" Robinson, of Hugo, Oklahoma, who said he was recruited for the role while at a rodeo simply standing around behind the chutes, as was the custom for cowboys who had not yet ridden their event. It took only a few years for the results to register: By 1972, the new Marlboro Man had so much appeal that Marlboro was catapulted to the top of the tobacco industry.

== Casting ==
Initially, cowboy commercials involving the Marlboro Man featured paid models, such as William Thourlby, pretending to carry out cowboy tasks. Among the earliest models were also employees of the advertising agency and the tobacco company itself, such as Andy Armstrong, Leo Burnett's art supervisor, who posed as a Navy lieutenant, and Robert Larking, Philip Morris's sales director. By the mid-1950s, the campaign shifted to professional actors, and cowboy commercials and magazine ads were popularized by actor Paul Birch.

However, Burnett felt that the commercials lacked authenticity, as it was apparent that the subjects were not real cowboys and did not have the desired rugged look. One of the finest was a non-smoking rodeo cowboy, Max Bryan "Turk" Robinson, who was recruited at a rodeo. Another, Robert C. Norris, was recruited after it was discovered he was a friend of John Wayne. He also never smoked, and after a twelve-year run as a Marlboro Man, quit the role to avoid badly influencing his children. He died, age 90, in 2019.

Leo Burnett was not satisfied with the cowboy actors found. Broadway and MGM movie actor Christian Haren won the role as the first Marlboro Man in the early 1960s as he looked the part. Burnett then came across Darrell Winfield, who worked on a ranch, after a cattle rancher by the name Keith Alexander declined the role because he did not believe in smoking. Leo Burnett's creative director was awed when he first saw Winfield: "I had seen cowboys, but I had never seen one that just really, like, he sort of scared the hell out of me (as he was so much a real cowboy)". Winfield, a resident of Riverton, Wyoming, was discovered in 1968 while working on the Quarter Circle 5 Ranch. His immediate authenticity led to his 20-year run as the Marlboro Man, which lasted until 1989. Upon Winfield's retirement, Philip Morris reportedly spent $300 million searching for a new Marlboro Man.

In 1974, Marlboro's marketing agency discovered rancher Herf Ingersoll at a rodeo in Augusta, Montana, and hired him to be photographed as the Marlboro Man.

After appearing as the Marlboro Man in 1987 advertising, former rodeo cowboy Brad Johnson landed a lead role in Steven Spielberg's feature film Always (1989), with Holly Hunter and Richard Dreyfuss.

Wayne Dunafon, a Kansas rancher and competitive rodeo rider, served as a Marlboro Man from 1964 to 1978. He had previously modeled for Lee Rider jeans, Firestone tires, and Chevrolet. Dunafon died of natural causes in 2001.

== Results ==
The use of the Marlboro Man campaign had very significant and immediate effects on sales. In 1954, before the campaign began, annual sales were approximately 18 million cigarettes. By 1955, after the national rollout of the cowboy-themed advertisements, sales surged to 6 billion cigarettes, and Marlboro became the fourth best-selling brand in the United States. By 1957, sales were at $20 billion, representing a 300% increase within two years. Philip Morris easily overcame growing health concerns through the Marlboro Man campaign, highlighting the success as well as the tobacco industry's strong ability to use mass marketing to influence and manipulate the public.

The immediate success of the Marlboro Man campaign led to heavy imitation. R. J. Reynolds adopted the tagline "independent thinkers" for its Old Golds cigarettes, while Liggett & Myers used cowboy and other rugged masculine figures for its Chesterfield brand, accompanied by the slogan "Men of America smoke Chesterfields."

== Smoking-related deaths ==
Five men who appeared in Marlboro-related advertisements—Wayne McLaren, David McLean, Dick Hammer, Eric Lawson and Jerome Edward Jackson, aka Tobin Jackson—died of smoking-related diseases, thus earning Marlboro cigarettes, specifically Marlboro Reds, the nickname "cowboy killers".

Wayne McLaren testified in favor of anti-smoking legislation at the age of 51. During McLaren's anti-smoking activism, Philip Morris denied that McLaren had ever appeared in a Marlboro ad, a position it later amended to say that while he did appear in ads, he was not the Marlboro Man; Winfield held that title. In response, McLaren produced an affidavit from a talent agency that had represented him, along with a pay stub, asserting he had been paid for work on a 'Marlboro print' job. McLaren died before his 52nd birthday in 1992.

David McLean died of lung cancer at the age of 73 in 1995. After his death, his widow, Lilo McLean, sued Philip Morris, claiming that McLean's disease was brought on because he had to smoke multiple packs of cigarettes during advertising shoots. Her case was dismissed, and she was forced to pay the cigarette company's court case costs.

Eric Lawson, who appeared in Marlboro print ads from 1978 to 1981, died at the age of 72 on January 10, 2014, of respiratory failure due to COPD. A smoker since age 14, Lawson later appeared in an anti-smoking commercial that parodied the Marlboro Man, and also in an Entertainment Tonight segment to discuss the negative effects of smoking.

Jerome Edward Jackson, aka Tobin Jackson, died of lung cancer in 2008.

== Cowboys ==
Marlboro television and print ads used several real cowboys who never smoked. The most famous of these was Darrell Winfield, who worked on the Quarter Circle 5 Ranch in Wyoming before being discovered by the Leo Burnett Agency in 1968. Winfield's chiselled rugged good looks made him the macho face of Marlboro cigarettes on television, in newspapers, magazines and on billboards from 1968 to 1989. He was survived by his wife, a son, five daughters, and grandchildren.

The Cowboy and His Elephant, which is ostensibly a biography of Bob Norris and mainly focuses on his raising an elephant on his ranch, also describes how Norris came to be photographed for Life magazine and become the Marlboro Man for the next twelve years.

From 1964 to 1978, Wayne Dunafon was a "Marlboro Man". He was a rancher in Kansas in addition to a long-time competitive rodeo rider. He died of natural causes in 2001.

== Decline ==
In many countries, the Marlboro Man is an icon of the past due to increasing pressure on tobacco advertising for health reasons, especially where the practice of smoking appears to be celebrated or glorified. The deaths described above may also have made it more difficult to use the campaign without attracting negative comment.

The 1998 Tobacco Master Settlement Agreement further restricted outdoor advertising, including billboards featuring the Marlboro Man. The Marlboro Man image continued into the 21st century in countries such as Germany, Poland and the Czech Republic. It last appeared late 2012 in Indonesia, where such cigarette advertisements are still allowed in the country. A year later, in May 2013, it had been officially replaced by Be Marlboro campaign.

It still continues (on tobacco vending machines, for example) in the United States and Japan, where smoking is widespread in the male population at nearly 30%.

== Death in the West ==
Death in the West, a Thames Television documentary directed by Martin Smith and reported by Peter Taylor, is an exposé of the cigarette industry that aired on British television in 1976 and later on U.S. public television in 1982. The documentary contrasted the advertising image of the Marlboro Man with the reality of six real American cowboys dying of cigarette-related illnesses. It also featured an interview with a Philip Morris executive who acknowledged that tar from cigarettes causes cancer in laboratory animals. In its March/April 1996 issue, Mother Jones said of Death in the West: "It is one of the most powerful anti-smoking films ever made. You will never see it." The second sentence refers to the fact that Philip Morris sued the filmmakers, and in a 1979 secret settlement all copies were suppressed. However, Professor Stanton Glantz released the film and San Francisco's then-NBC affiliate KRON-TV aired the documentary in May 1982.

The California Nonsmokers' Rights Foundation, in cooperation with the Risk and Youth: Smoking Project Lawrence Hall of Science University of California, Berkeley, created a manual to accompany the film, titled "A Curriculum for Death in the West". The first two paragraphs of the Introduction read:

The California Nonsmokers' Rights Foundation is pleased to provide this booklet containing a self-contained curriculum for upper elementary and junior high school students to supplement the viewing of "Death in the West." Considered by many to be the most powerful anti-smoking documentary ever made, "Death in the West" contrasts the advertising image of the "Marlboro Man" with the reality of six American cowboys dying of cigarette-related illnesses. The film, produced in England in 1976 and later suppressed by the Philip Morris Company, makers of Marlboro cigarettes, illustrates the intrinsically false nature of cigarette advertising. It makes the Marlboro Man less attractive.
The "Death in the West" Curriculum is designed to maximize the educational and emotional impact of seeing the documentary. The curriculum is based on a comprehensive smoking prevention program created and tested by the Risk and Youth: Smoking Project of the Lawrence Hall of Science, University of California, Berkeley. The activities included here were developed in classrooms throughout the San Francisco Bay Area and adapted specifically for use with the airing of "Death in the West" by KRON-TV of San Francisco.

NBC Monitor produced an investigative TV report titled Death in the West (June 18, 1983), which is accessible at the Internet Archive.

== In popular culture ==
=== Film and television ===
- In Robert Altman's 1973 film The Long Goodbye, Roger Wade (Sterling Hayden) nicknames P.I. Philip Marlowe (Elliott Gould) the Marlboro Man due to his heavy smoking.
- In the film Harley Davidson and the Marlboro Man (1991), Don Johnson portrays the Marlboro Man, a cowboy outlaw who partners with Mickey Rourke's biker character in a neo-Western heist plot.
- In the film The Lost World: Jurassic Park (1997), Ian Malcolm (Jeff Goldblum) refers to the InGen mercenaries as Marlboro Men during a verbal confrontation with Peter Ludlow (Arliss Howard), after the death of Eddie Carr (Richard Schiff).
- In the film Thank You for Smoking (2005), Sam Elliott plays Lorne Lutch, a cancer-stricken former Marlboro Man.

=== Music ===
- The Matt Roy song "Marlboro Man" features the chorus "Marlboro Man ain't cool no more".
- The Paula Cole song "Where Have All the Cowboys Gone?" (1996) features the verse "Where is my Marlboro Man?"
- The Rage Against the Machine song "People of the Sun" (1996) features the verse "I'm the Marlboro Man".
- The Harvey Danger song "Sad Sweetheart of the Rodeo" features the sarcastic verse: "The Marlboro Man died of cancer/And he wasn't a rocket scientist when he was healthy/ha ha ha".
- The Jason Aldean song "Dirt Road Anthem" references "The king in the can and the Marlboro Man".
- The D-A-D song "Marlboro Man" is about the advertisements featuring the character.
- The Neil Young song "Big Green Country" refers to the Marlboro man as "the cancer cowboy", who was "pure as driven snow" before his death.
- The World Entertainment War song "Marlboro Man, Jr." begins, "The Marlboro Man is dead Long live the Marlboro Man! In our dreams he remains the hero of a thousand billboards The ultimate salesman..."
- The 1997 Incubus album S.C.I.E.N.C.E. features the head of the Marlboro Man, as portrayed by the singer's father in the 1960s.
- The Solefald song "Speed Increased To Scaffold" references a Marlboro Man amid a litany of other popular culture references scattered throughout the Neonism album.
- The Strokes' 7th studio album Reality Awaits features one of Richard Prince's Untitled (Cowboy) photographs (depicting the Marlboro Man) as the album cover.
- Noisecontrollers has a song called "Marlboro man".

=== Photography ===
- Artist Richard Prince produced the Untitled (Cowboy) Series (from 1980 to 1992 and ongoing), a series of appropriated rephotographs depicting the Marlboro Man that attempted to 'recontextualise' the stereotypical 'stoic' American Cowboy. One such photograph sold for over $1 million at auction.
- Photographer Norm Clasen took original photographs for the Marlboro Man campaign, which were the images that Richard Prince would go on to appropriate. Clasen's photographs have subsequently gone on view in the gallery setting with his series, Titled (Cowboy).

== See also ==
- Joe Camel
- Elsie the Cow
