= Peter Taylor (journalist) =

British journalist and documentary-maker

Peter Taylor CBE
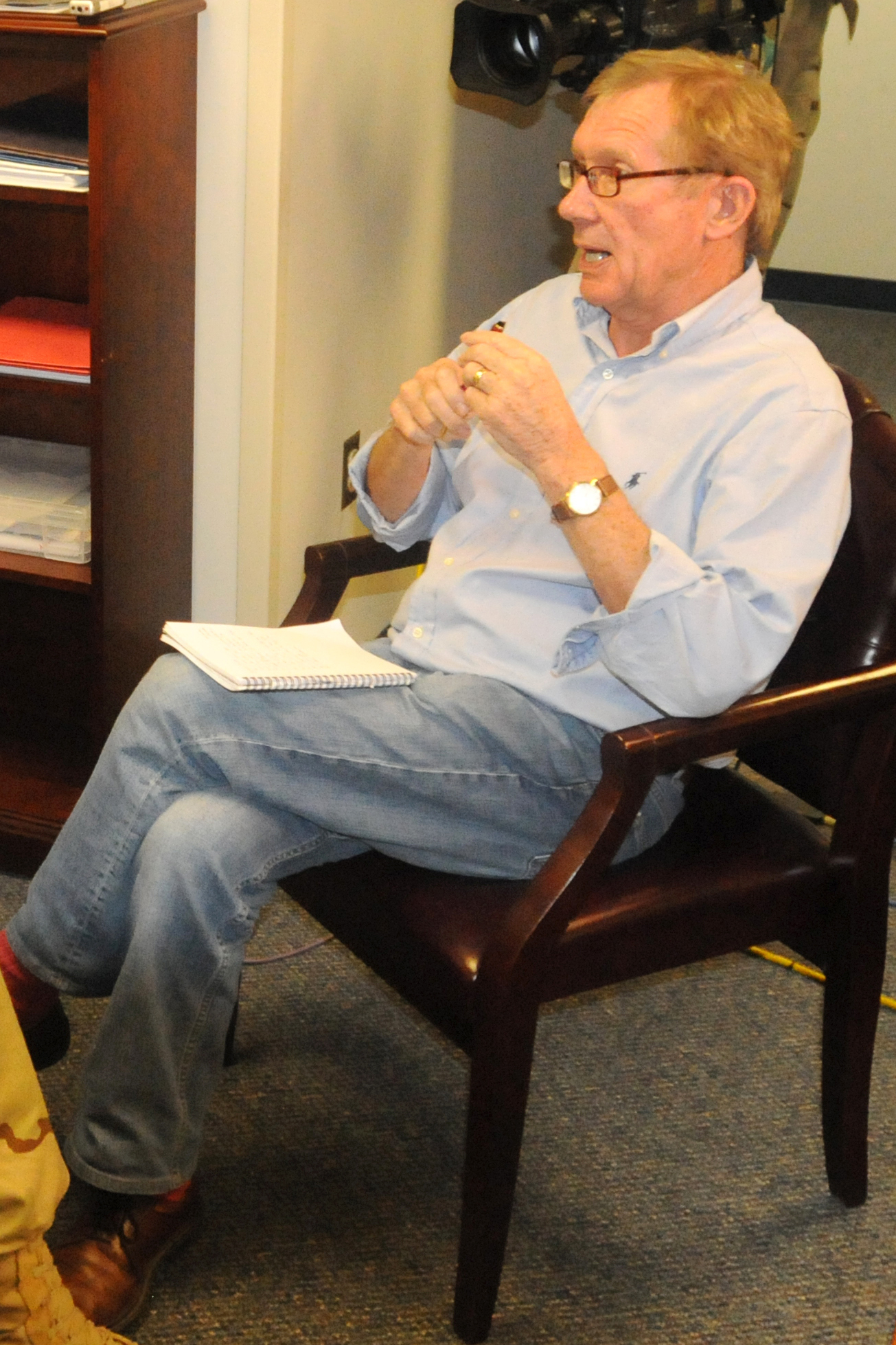
- Peter Taylor interviewing in 2011
- Born: Peter Robert Taylor; 1942 (age 83–84); Driffield, East Riding of Yorkshire, England
- Education: Pembroke College, Cambridge
- Occupations: Journalist, writer, documentary-maker
- Known for: Coverage of The Troubles), Al Qaeda and Islamist extremism, smoking and health
- Spouse: Susan McConachy (m. 1974; d. 2006)
- Children: 2
- Awards: CBE (2025), WHO Gold Medal for Services to Public Health, Royal Television Society awards, BAFTA nominations

Peter Robert Taylor CBE (born 1942) is a British journalist, writer and documentary-maker. He is best known for his coverage of the political and armed conflict in Northern Ireland, widely known as the Troubles, and for his investigation of Al Qaeda and Islamist extremism in the wake of 9/11. He also covers the issue of smoking and health and the politics of tobacco for which he was awarded the WHO Gold Medal for Services to Public Health. He has written books and researched, written and presented television documentaries over a period of more than forty years.

In 2014, Taylor was awarded both a Royal Television Society lifetime achievement award and a BAFTA special award.

== Early life ==
Taylor was born in 1942 in Driffield, East Riding of Yorkshire, and was educated at Barrowcliff Junior School and Scarborough High School for Boys, a state boys' grammar school, followed by Pembroke College, Cambridge, where he read classics, Modern History and Social and Political Sciences.

== Career ==
Taylor's career reporting on political violence began with ITV's This Week in 1967, and continued with BBC's Panorama from 1980 to 2014. His 2013 Panorama special, The Spies Who Fooled the World, investigated the intelligence used to justify the Iraq War. He has made many authored series for BBC1 and BBC2 on the security and intelligence services and five documentary series since the 9/11 attacks on Al Qaeda and Islamist extremism, culminating in his acclaimed The Secret War on Terror to mark the 10th anniversary of 9/11 which the Financial Times described as "a small masterpiece of clarity as to our present condition." In 2015, he investigated the funding of ISIS in his programme World's Richest Terror Army.

Taylor has written nine books on political violence, his latest being Operation Chiffon: The Secret Story of MI5 and MI6 and the Road to Peace in Ireland. Others include Beating the Terrorists? Interrogation in Omagh, Gough and Castlereagh, and his Northern Ireland trilogy on the Troubles called, Provos: The IRA and Sinn Féin, Loyalists, and Brits: The War against the IRA. Each book deals with the Northern Irish conflict from the perspective of one of the three main parties involved: the Provisional IRA; the various Ulster loyalist paramilitary groups; and the British government and security forces. The trilogy provides an insight into all the main groups involved and the violent and political events that occurred throughout this turbulent period in Anglo-Irish history. Taylor's books feature interviews with people connected to some of the most significant incidents and landmark political events in Northern Ireland during this time.

In 2000, Taylor presented the three part BBC2 series Brits on the covert war in Northern Ireland including interviews of former members of 14 Intelligence Company, the RUC Headquarters Mobile Support Unit and MI6. In 2007, he wrote and presented the BBC four-part series, Age of Terror. In April 2012, he was presenter and reporter for the BBC2 two-part series Modern Spies, in which he interviewed serving members of MI5, the Secret Intelligence Service and GCHQ (anonymously). The Guardian described it as "meticulously researched and enviably sourced."

Taylor's documentaries on smoking and health and the politics of tobacco include four for ITV in the 1970s: Dying for a Fag (ITV's This Week 1975); Licence to Kill; Ashes to Ashes (ITV's This Week 1976); and Death in the West. The Marlboro Story. In the 1980s, he continued his investigations into the tobacco industry with BBC TV's Panorama programme: A Dying Industry (BBC 1980) and The Habit the Government can’t Break (BBC 1985). He also published his book, Smoke Ring. The Politics of Tobacco in 1985. In May/June 2014, a new BBC series, Burning Desire was aired with Taylor as the presenter.

In 2014, Taylor was awarded a Royal Television Society lifetime achievement award and a BAFTA special award for his career's contribution to factual and current affairs television. Awarding Taylor his BAFTA, Sir Jeremy Isaacs described him as "Mr Valiant for the Truth", referencing John Bunyan's Pilgrim's Progress. In 2015, Taylor secured the first British television interview with former CIA analyst Edward Snowden, living in exile in Moscow, for Panorama. He was awarded a CBE in the 2025 New Year's Honours List

== Personal life ==
Taylor was married to fellow journalist Susan McConachy from 1974 until her death on 16 November 2006. They had two children, Ben and Sam. He is the older brother of John Taylor, former Presenter & Producer/Director LWT's The London Programme and reporter on Panorama worked on ITV's This Week, presented Carlton Television's Inside Crime, and worked for Channel Five's Crime Report, Reported on London News Network's London Tonight, and was at BBC News.

== Awards ==
Taylor has been the recipient of numerous awards:

- Three Royal Television Society (RTS) Best Home Documentary awards:
  - "Coincidence or Conspiracy?" (Panorama on the Stalker Affair) (1987)
  - "The Volunteer" (from "Families at War") (1990)
  - "Enemies Within" (Inside Story Special on the Maze Prison) (1991)
- RTS Judges Award for his contribution to television journalism (1995)
- RTS Judges Award for his Irish trilogy, "Provos", "Loyalists" and "Brits" (2001).
- Elected Fellow of the Royal Television Society
- RTS Journalist of the Year (2003)
- John Grierson Award for Best Historical Documentary "SAS. Embassy Siege" (2003)
- James Cameron Award "for work as a journalist that combined moral vision and professional integrity" (2008)
- Honorary Doctor of Letters, Bradford University, for his work on terrorism and political violence (2008)
- Christopher Ewart-Biggs prize for lifetime's contribution to Anglo-Irish understanding. (2013)
- Four BAFTA nominations:
  - "Dying for a Fag" (1975)
  - "SAS Embassy Siege" (2003)
  - "Brighton Bomb" (2003)
  - "Generation Jihad" (2010)
- Lifetime achievement award from the Royal Television Society (2014).
- BAFTA special award for his career's contribution to factual and current affairs television (2014)

=== Publications ===
- Beating the Terrorists. Interrogation at Omagh, Gough and Castlereagh (1980). Cobden Trust prize for contribution to human rights.
- Smoke Ring. The Politics of Tobacco (1984)
- Stalker. The Search for the Truth (1986)
- Families at War (1989)
- States of Terror. Democracy and Political Violence (1993)
- Provos. The IRA and Sinn Féin (1998)
- Loyalists (1999)
- Brits. The War Against the IRA (2000)
- Talking to Terrorists. A Personal Journey from the IRA to Al Qaeda (2011)
- Operation Chiffon: The Secret Story of MI5 and MI6 and the Road to Peace in Ireland (2023)
