= Spectres of the Spectrum =

- Directed by: Craig Baldwin
- Written by: Craig Baldwin
- Produced by: Craig Baldwin
- Cinematography: Bill Daniel
- Edited by: Bill Daniel
- Production company: Other City Productions
- Release date: October 5, 1999 (VIFF)
- Running time: 94 minutes
- Country: United States
- Language: English

Spectres of the Spectrum is a 1999 science fiction collage film by American filmmaker Craig Baldwin. The story follows a father and daughter living in post-apocalyptic wasteland as they fight against corporate control of the electromagnetic spectrum. The film mixes found footage with live-action scenes.

== Plot ==
In the year 2007, a telepathic woman Boo Boo and her father Yogi live in a post-apocalyptic wasteland. The New Electromagnetic Order rules the world, opposed by the TV Tesla resistance movement. Boo Boo, able to withstand the radioactive atmosphere, must go back in time 50 years and trace TV broadcasts of Science in Action to find an encoded secret from her grandmother. Meanwhile, Yogi scans the history of the electromagnetic conflict. After decoding the secret message, Boo Boo flies into the Sun to unleash a chain reaction that weaponizes the Sun's energy.

== Cast ==
- Sean Kilcoyne as Yogi
- Caroline Koebel as Boo Boo
- Beth Lisick as Boo Boo (voice)

== Production ==
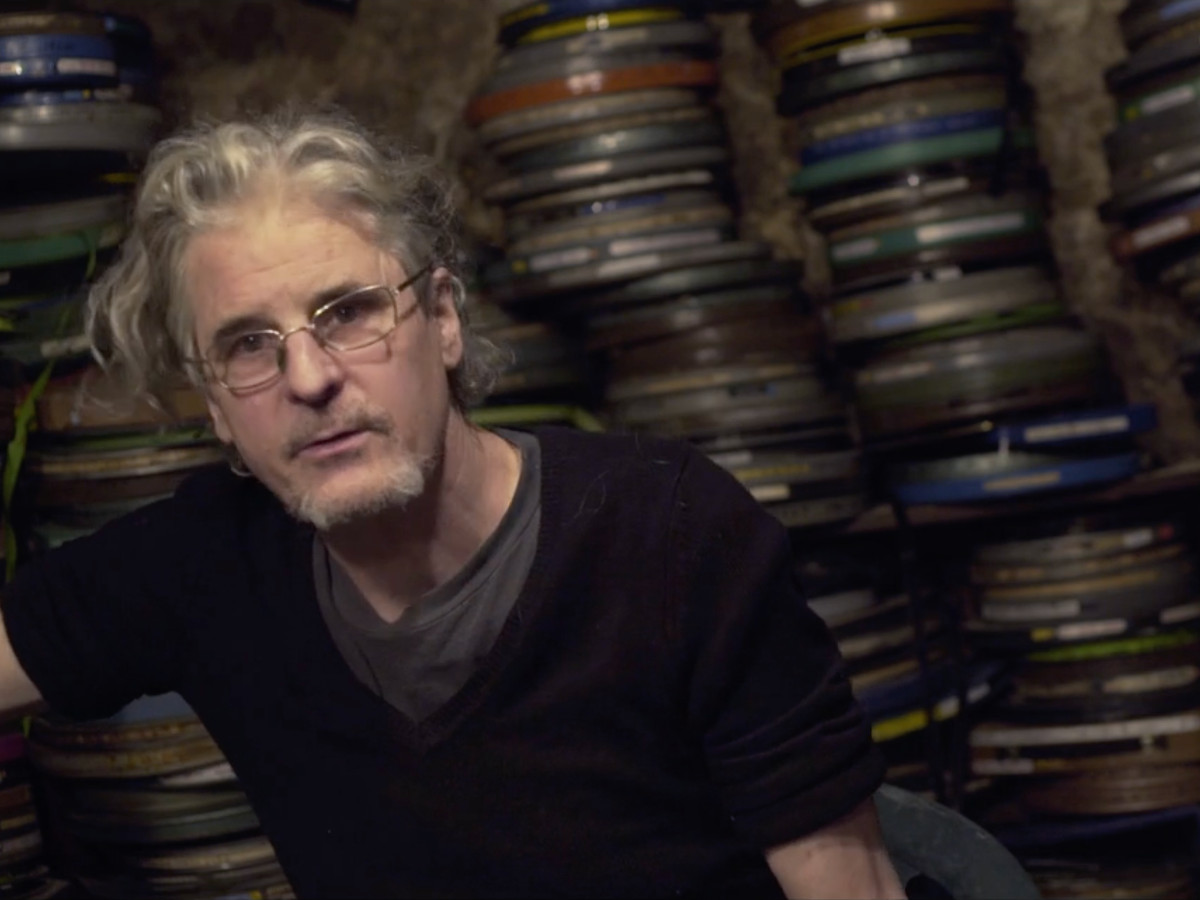
Director Craig Baldwin with his collection of films in 2015

Baldwin worked on Spectres of the Spectrum over three years. The film primarily draws from archival material that Baldwin kept in the basement of his studio space in San Francisco. His collection included hundreds of educational Science in Action episodes, discarded by the Exploratorium. Baldwin was motivated to use these because the show regularly had military figures as guest stars, which he thought perfectly captured "the reality of science being coopted by the military".

Additional live-action scenes were shot on 16 mm film. Caroline Koebel's scenes did not have sync sound, and voiceover was added instead.

== Release ==
Spectres of the Spectrum premiered October 5, 1999 at the Vancouver International Film Festival. It was selected to screen at the 1999 New York Film Festival, the 2000 Whitney Biennial, and the 2000 London Film Festival. When the Church of Scientology found out about a mention of L. Ron Hubbard's time working as an intelligence agent, they sent Baldwin a letter documenting their account of Hubbard's life.

=== Critical reception ===
A. O. Scott wrote that the Spectres of the Spectrum was "exhausting and ultimately bewildering…[but] not without a certain visual and conceptual brilliance, or, thankfully, a sense of humor." Jonathan Romney of The Guardian called it "radical pop art, and head-spinningly entertaining storytelling, if you manage to keep up with it." In his review for Variety magazine, Ken Eisner described it as a "concentrated lightning bolt of fascinating weirdness" but noted that it was relatively inaccessible for mainstream audiences and could become "a coveted item among youthful cognoscenti."
