= Kal Spelletich =

American contemporary artist

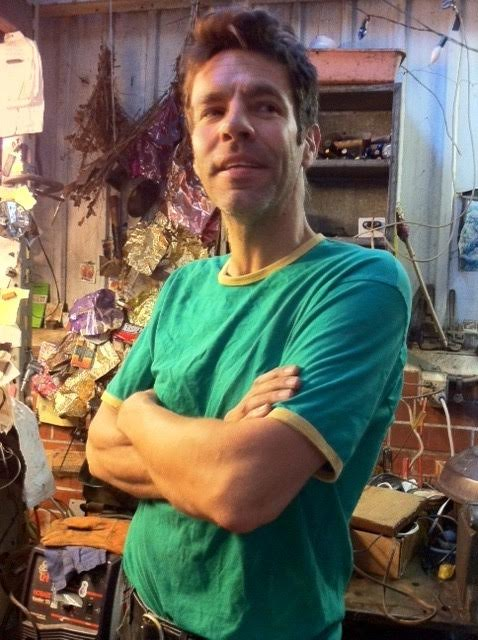
- Born: Kalman Spelletich; 1960 (age 65–66); Davenport, Iowa, U.S.
- Known for: Machine art
- Movement: San Francisco Machine Art

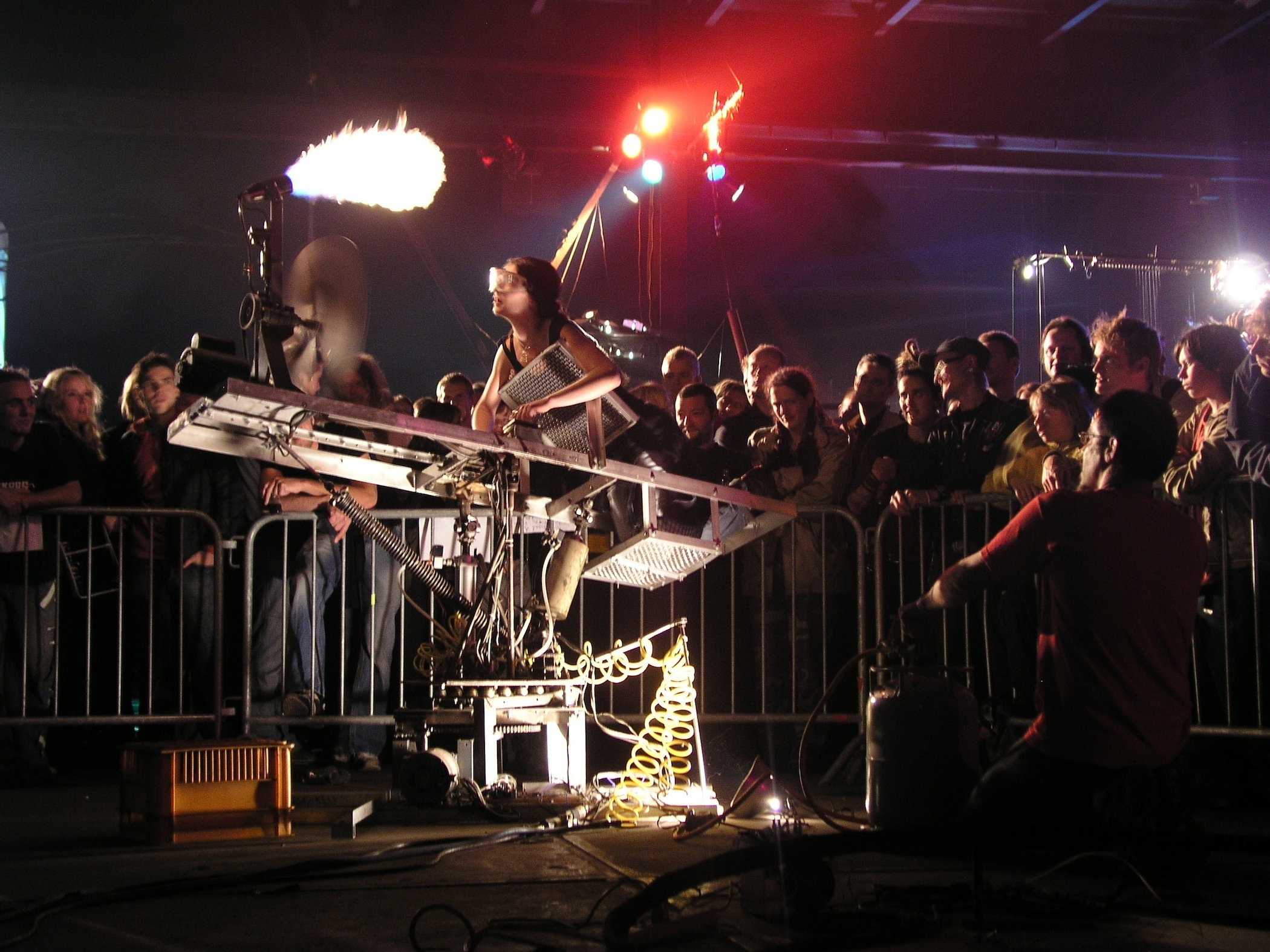
An audience interacts with Flight Simulator, 2002

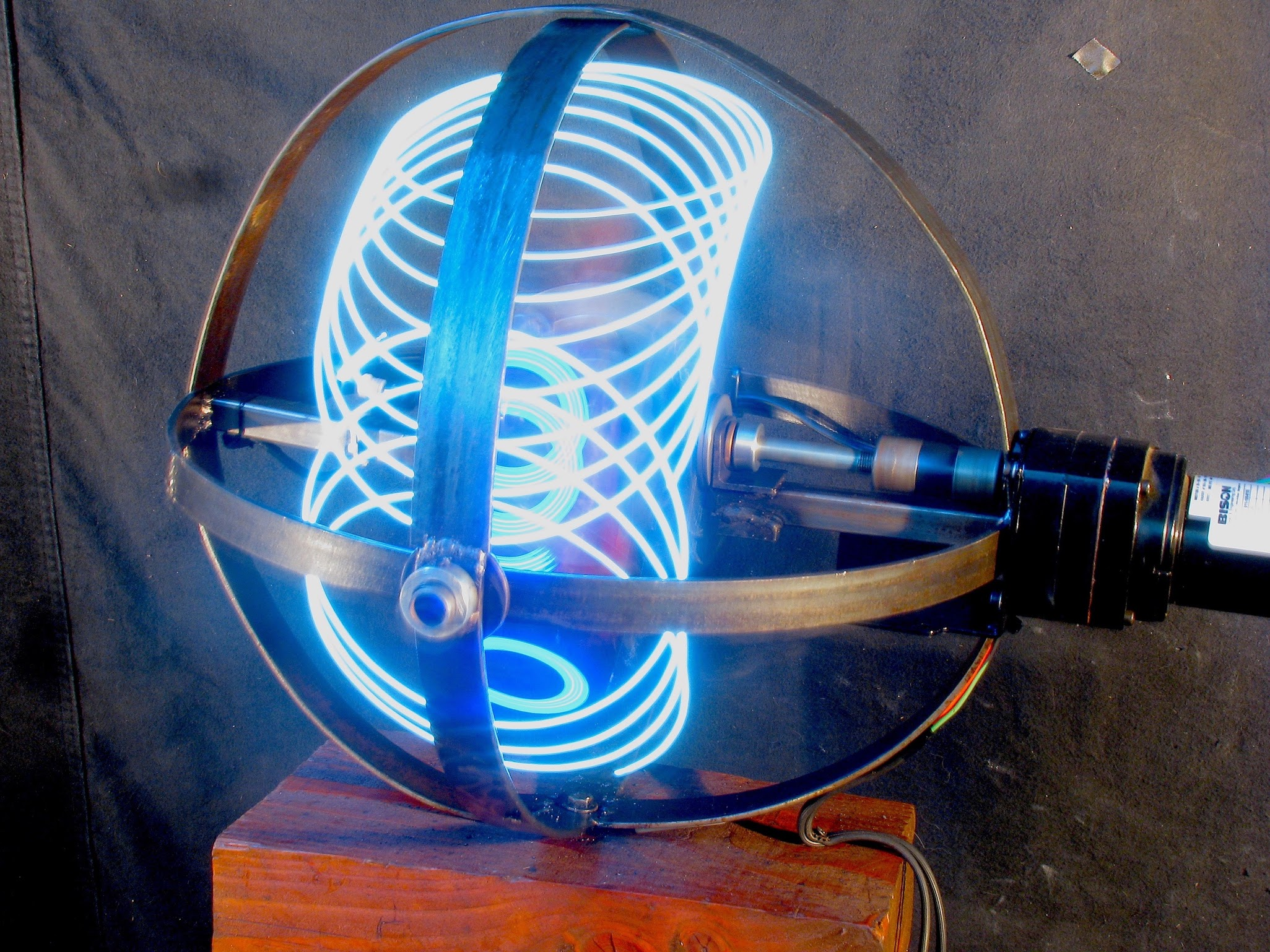
Intention Machine Prayer Wheel, 2015

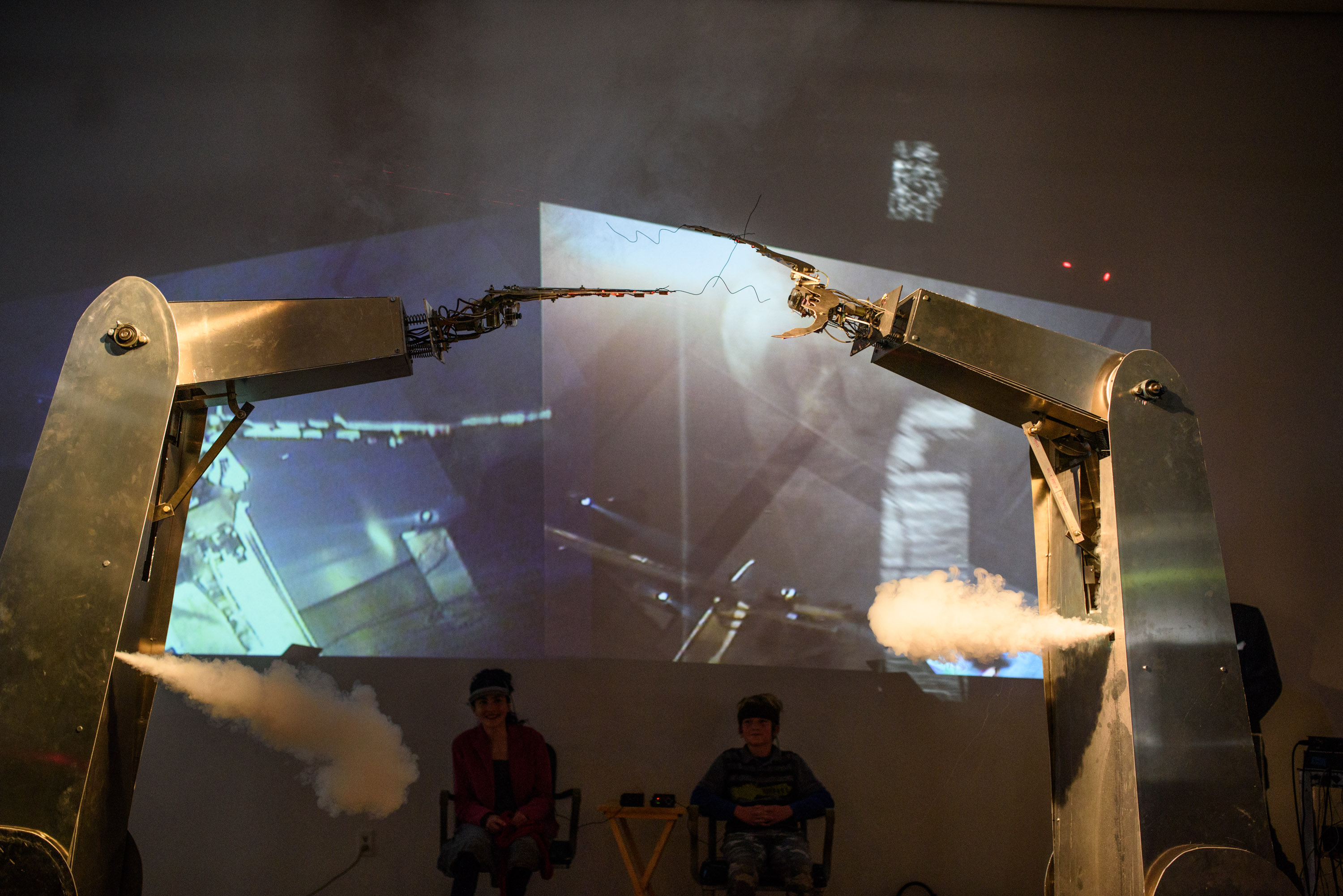
Split Brain Robotics, 2017

Kal Spelletich (/ˈspɛlətɪtʃ/ SPELL-ə-titch) is an American contemporary artist. A pioneer of San Francisco's machine art scene, he hand builds complex machines and robots. Current work, in 2018, includes building functional artificial robotic organs as a residence of the Stochastic Labs in Berkeley California. Through a collaboration with audience members who volunteer to control or operate his sculptures, Spelletich's work explores the interface of robots and humans. Early work frequently incorporated fire and "extremely dangerous" situations, to examine the boundaries of fear, control and exhilaration. By the late 1990s Spelletich started incorporating sensors in his sculptures to engage with questions about technology, spirituality, and play.

== Early life and education ==
Spelletich grew up in Davenport, Iowa, where his parents owned a construction company. The seventh of nine children, he was given a chemistry set at nine, and began to experiment with fire and alchemy. At 18, he joined the International Harvester tractor assembly line and as a member of the United Auto Workers Union, he was exposed to mass production and large scale building processes.

Spelletich attended the University of Iowa. He studied photography and graduated with a BFA in interdisciplinary art. He earned an MFA from the University of Texas, Austin. He helped to start the Austin Media Arts Center after he received his master's degree.

== Career ==
Spelletich is considered a pioneer of San Francisco's machine-art scene. Spelletich builds interactive robots and brain machine interfaces using technology currently at the forefront of scientific research for medical, militaristic or consumer applications.

Spelletich explores emotional boundaries related to risk and play. His work is interactive, requiring participants to enter or operate the piece, often against their instincts of self-preservation. The collaboration with the audience completes the work. His work often includes elements of fear, play, humor and absurdity such as a hugging machine, robots that grab and lift the participants in the air, harvest and respond to bio data and praying robots.

Brain machine interface work began in 2016 and includes Split Brain Robotics (collaboration with Mitch Altman ) which incorporates a hacked EEG as a neural interface and a computer to analyze the data and signal the robots responses.

In September, 2016, Amazon Video greenlit a pilot Budding Prospects that is based on the life of Kal Spelletich in the 1980s.

=== Early work ===
In 1989 Spelletich founded the interactive machine art performance collective Seemen (stylized SEEMEN) — in the 1991 Richard Linklater film Slacker, Spelletich played a character who wore a backpack of television sets, similar to the TV backpacks the Seemen wore in their "often-jarring" performances. He was involved in Austin's music scene, and collaborated with bands including the Butthole Surfers and Scratch Acid. In August 1999, Spin wrote that Spelletich's work was influenced by American punk rock and informed by his "homegrown mechanical expertise" and his "art school exposure to Dadaists and Duchamp." With Seemen, he constructed "notorious" installations at the Burning Man festival such as the three headed hound Cerebus, an animated fire spewing sculpture made of metal.

In 2001, Spelletich began to build pieces that incorporated biofeedback sensors. The Levitator lifted a volunteer based on a device that measured respiration; another piece used breath analysis to connect a turbine jet engine with an afterburner. The installation The EKG Ring monitored volunteers sitting in the center of a ring of fire, with the fire pulsing in time with their heartbeats. In 2006, he constructed "Monkey on Your Back", a backpack robot with multiple arms and EKG sensors that responded to changes in a participant's heart rate.
