= Darrell Winfield =

American rancher and model (1929–2015)

Darrell H. Winfield
- Born: July 30, 1929; Kansas, Oklahoma, U.S.
- Died: January 12, 2015 (aged 85); Riverton, Wyoming, U.S.
- Occupations: rancher, model
- Known for: Marlboro Man in TV and magazine advertisements

Darrell H. Winfield (July 30, 1929 – January 12, 2015) was an American rancher and model best known as "The Marlboro Man" in television commercials and magazine advertisements for Marlboro cigarettes. He was a macho cowboy whose image in advertising from the 1950s to the late 1990s made filtered cigarettes more appealing to men.

== Biography ==
Winfield was born in Kansas, Oklahoma. His family relocated to California's San Joaquin Valley when he was six years old. This move was part of the "Okie migration" of the 1930s in which many midwest farming families, devastated by the Dust Bowl, headed west to California to start over. He was the Marlboro Man from 1968 until 1989. He is also credited with being the most portrayed man in the world by some. Philip Morris has used many cowboys for their ads but has declared that Winfield was "really the Marlboro man."

As an adult, Winfield moved to Wyoming and began ranching. Executives from Leo Burnett Worldwide, an advertising agency, visited the ranch where Winfield was working in June 1968 to take photographs for a new Phillip Morris sales campaign. They liked Winfield's looks and asked him if he would be interested in working for Marlboro. The first Marlboro advertisement featuring Winfield was "The Sheriff".

In a 1986 interview, Winfield stated that he thought that his "life would have basically been the same" had he not been given the chance to work for Marlboro.

== Death and legacy ==
Winfield died in Riverton, Wyoming, on January 12, 2015, aged 85. That year Winfield was inducted into the Wyoming Cowboy Hall of Fame.

== See also ==
- Marlboro Man
