= Craig Baldwin =

American experimental filmmaker

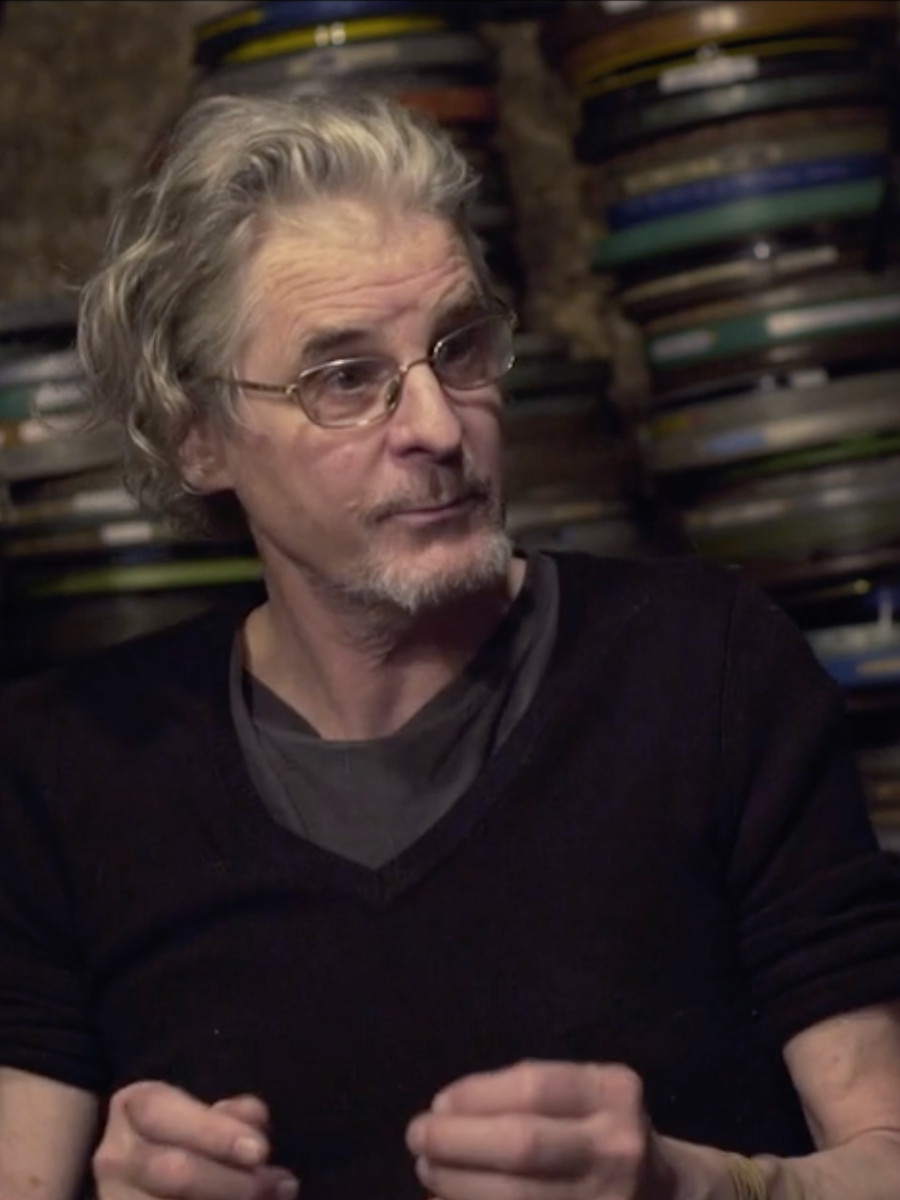
- Craig Baldwin in 2015
- Born: 1952 (age 73–74); Oakland, California, U.S.
- Occupation: Filmmaker
- Notable work: Tribulation 99, Mock Up on Mu

Craig Baldwin (born 1952) is an American experimental filmmaker. He uses found footage from the fringes of popular consciousness as well as images from the mass media to undermine and transform the traditional documentary, infusing it with the energy of high-speed montage and a provocative commentary that targets subjects from intellectual property rights to rampant consumerism.

== Early life ==
Craig Gartrel Baldwin was born in Oakland, California. He grew up the youngest child in a middle-class family in Carmichael. During high school, he became interested in Beatnik culture. He went to underground film screenings and started filming with a Super 8 camera.

Baldwin attended college at University of California, Davis. There, he took film classes through the theatre department and began collecting films. He was also politically active as a student. Baldwin left UC Davis in the early 1970s and later attended the University of California at Santa Barbara.

== Career ==
=== Early activities (1976–1990) ===
Baldwin made his Super 8 film Stolen Movie in 1976 by running into movie theaters and filming the screen. He made his next short film, Flick Skin, while working at porn theaters. Baldwin made his 1978 film Wild Gunman, a critical look at the figure of the Marlboro Man, using clips from the 1974 Nintendo arcade game of the same name, as well as B-movies and advertisements obtained from grindhouses.

In 1984, Baldwin moved to San Francisco's Mission District and contributed to the founding of Artists' Television Access In 1987, he started his long-running Other Cinema series at the space. In 1986, Baldwin earned an M.A. from San Francisco State University. It was there that he first became interested in collage film during his studies with Bruce Conner.

It was during this period that Baldwin started amassing a large collection of film works, many of which were discarded by institutions moving over to VHS. He drew from this collection for his 1986 film RocketKitKongoKit, which narrates the CIA's role in establishing Mobutu Sese Seko's military dictatorship in Zaire (now the DR Congo) and the history of rocket testing there by a German weapons manufacturer. It often visually re-enacts the story with loosely associated footage, such as cartoons, industrial films, or science fiction films. Like many of Baldwin's later works, RocketKitKongoKit used documentary techniques not to present an authoritative history but to counter official histories by presenting alternative histories and blurring the boundaries between them.

An early proponent of culture jamming, Baldwin has altered billboards with political messages and has documented the work of the Billboard Liberation Front through the 1990s.

=== Mid-career work (1991–2000) ===
Tribulation 99: Alien Anomalies Under America (1991) is an account of CIA intervention in developing countries (as well as a critique of paranoid conspiracy theories) presented in the form of a pseudo-documentary that recounts the history of an alien occupation of Latin America in 99 brief ramblings. J. Hoberman put Tribulation 99 as #3 on his list of the ten best films 1991–2000.

Baldwin's ¡O No Coronado! (1992) is a retelling of the invasion of the American southwest by Francisco Vázquez de Coronado in the mid-16th century. It was his first film to include original live-action footage. His next film, Sonic Outlaws, spotlights the Concord-based band Negativland, which was sued in 1991 by U2 over a parody sound collage it had made. Baldwin's film chronicles that case along with various activist groups working for copyright reform.

Baldwin's 1999 film Spectres of the Spectrum is a science fiction allegory that tells the story of a young woman with telepathic powers who travels back in time to save the world from an electro-magnetic pulse. The film takes a cautionary stance against the media outlets in charge of creating and perpetuating the popular mainstream, and in doing so, follows the trajectory, through collage, of media from its beginnings to the present. In 2000 Baldwin received the Moving Image Creative Capital Award.

=== Later work (2001–present) ===
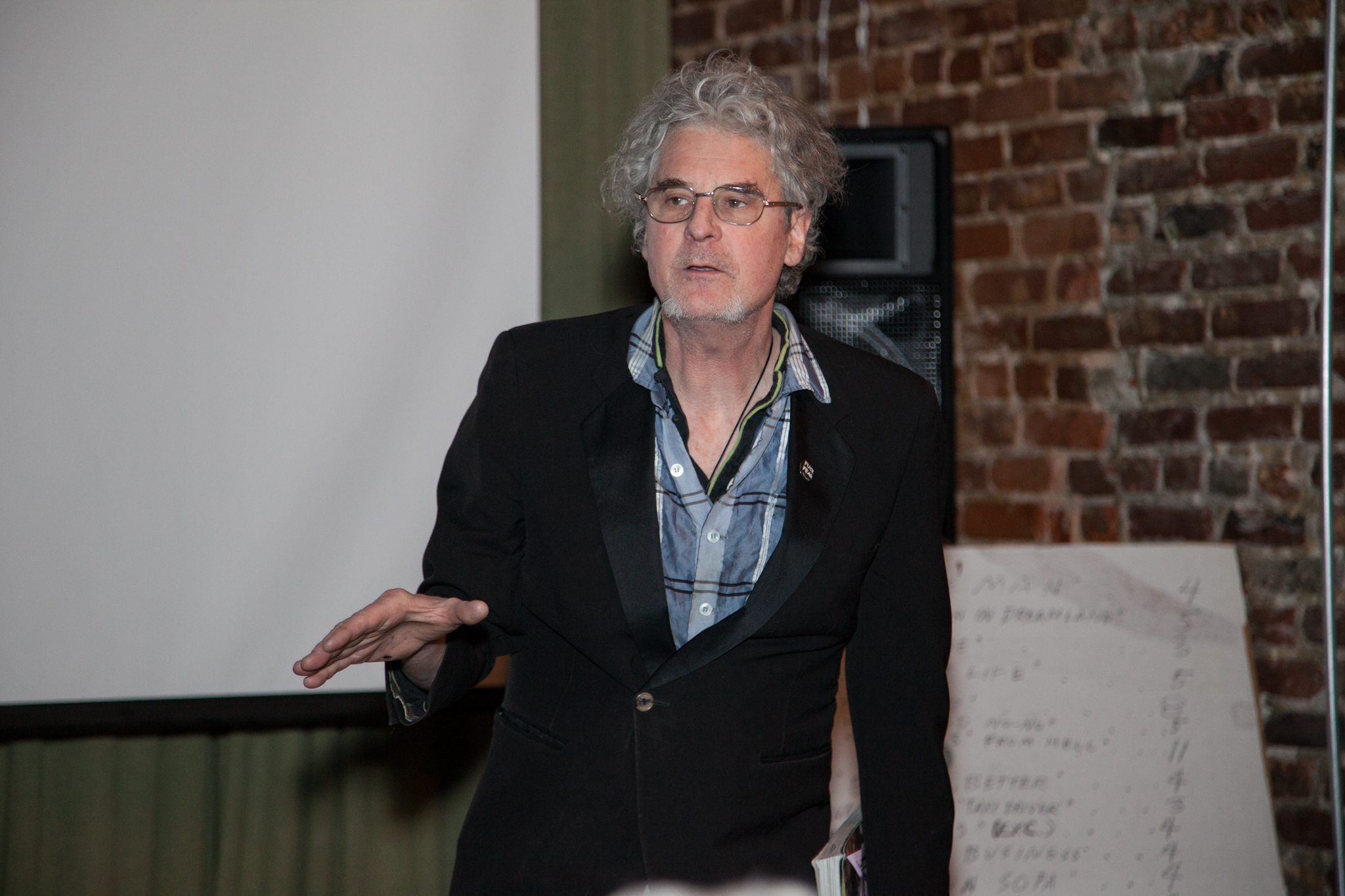
Baldwin in 2012

Baldwin established Other Cinema Digital in 2003 to provide distribution for films by independent, underground, and experimental filmmakers. In 2005 the label partnered with Facets Video to distribute a series of works on DVD.

In 2008, Baldwin created Mock Up on Mu, a fictional story based heavily on real facts of the lives of L. Ron Hubbard, Marjorie Cameron, Aleister Crowley, and Jack Parsons. Mostly assembled from found footage, Mock Up on Mu includes more original live-action footage than in earlier projects.

Baldwin has taught at UC Davis and UC Berkeley. Craig Baldwin: Avant to Live!, a 2023 book published by San Francisco Cinematheque and INCITE, surveys his work and career.

== Filmography ==
- Stolen Movie (1976)
- Flick Skin (1977)
- Wild Gunman (1978)
- RocketKitKongoKit (1986)
- Tribulation 99: Alien Anomalies Under America (1991)
- ¡O No Coronado! (1992)
- Sonic Outlaws (1995)
- Spectres of the Spectrum (1999)
- Mock Up on Mu (2009)
