= Down the Gasoline Trail =

1935 cartoon sponsored film

Down the Gasoline Trail is a 1935 cartoon sponsored film created to promote Chevrolet automobiles. It is about an animated drop of gasoline, who travels through the car, eventually entering the engine and being vapourised. It is in the public domain.

The film features animation layered over still photographs of car parts. It was produced by Jam Handy.

== See also ==
- A Coach for Cinderella
