= Panorama Ephemera =

Panorama Ephemera is a 2004 collage film by film archivist Rick Prelinger.

== Summary ==
A meditative chronicle featuring 64 self-contained sequences from a wide variety of ephemeral films touring conflicted North American landscapes while focusing on familiar and mythical imagery from America's past (1626–1978).

== List of notable films featured ==
- Last Clear Chance (1959)
- Master Hands (1936)
- This Is Hormel (1965)
- The Private Life of a Cat (1947)
- The House in the Middle (1954)
- Age 13 (1955)

== See also ==
- List of films in the public domain
- Americana (culture)
- Internet Archive
- Mystery Science Theater 3000 - featured some of the films shown on Panorama Ephemera
  - RiffTrax - featured some of the films shown on Panorama Ephemera
