= Last Clear Chance =

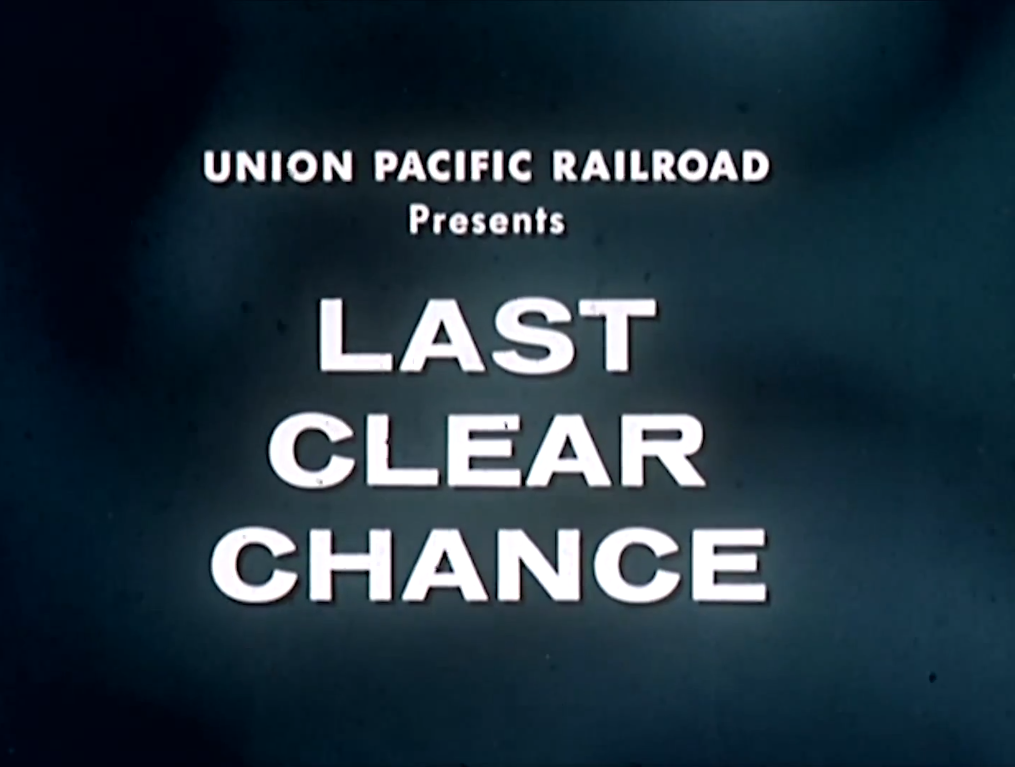
- Title card
- Directed by: Robert Carlisle
- Screenplay by: Leland Baxter
- Produced by: Robert Carlisle
- Starring: William Boyett; Harold Agee; Mrs. Harold Agee; William Agee
- Narrated by: William Boyett
- Cinematography: Bert Spielvogel
- Edited by: Mort Fallick
- Production companies: Wondsel, Carlisle & Dunphy Inc
- Distributed by: Union Pacific Railroad
- Release date: 1959
- Running time: 25 minutes
- Country: United States
- Language: English

Last Clear Chance is a 1959 American short film produced and directed by Robert Carlisle. Sponsored by the Union Pacific Railroad, Last Clear Chance is a safety film intended to warn young drivers to be careful at railroad crossings. The film's cast consists of William Boyett, Harold Agee, Mrs. Harold Agee, Tim Bosworth, William Agee, Christine Lynch, and Lou Spraker. Written by Leland Baxter, the film was shot in parts of Idaho. Wondsel, Carlisle & Dunphy Inc, based in New York City, served as the film's production company.

The film centers on the Dixon family, in particular Alan Dixon, who has recently received his driver's license and is eager to begin driving a car. When Idaho State Trooper Hal Jackson visits the Dixons and learns that Alan's license has arrived, he sits down and tells Alan ways to drive safely and avoid getting into accidents. Although the film is fictional, it was inspired by a real family who experienced a scenario similar to the film. During production, assistance was provided by staff of the National Safety Council, along with the Idaho State Police and the Colorado State Patrol.

Last Clear Chance was distributed by Union Pacific and was featured in a 1993 episode of Mystery Science Theater 3000. A copy of the film is preserved in the Prelinger Archives, where it is able to be downloaded or streamed online free of charge.

== Plot ==
Idaho state trooper Hal Jackson (William Boyett) arrives at the funeral for a young man from the Dixon family who has died in a car accident. Hal, a friend of the Dixon family, does not go inside, feeling it would be too difficult to take. Hal finds it hard to believe that, only a few days ago, the Dixons were a relatively regular family. In flashback, he recounts what led to this death. Frank Jr. (Bill Agee) has returned home for the summer to aid his father, Frank Sr. (Harold Agee), on the family farm. He also visits his girlfriend Betty Hutchins (Christine Lynch). When Frank Sr.'s new tractor arrives at the local train station, Frank Jr.'s brother Alan (Tim Bosworth) wishes to drive it, having recently taken a driver's test. His father disallows it, so Frank Jr. drives it home.

The next day, Alan discovers that his license has arrived in the mail. Ecstatic, he wishes to drive immediately, asking his family members if they need help with any errands. Later, Hal shows up at the Dixon home. Knowing that Alan's license had been scheduled to arrive, he begins to talk to Alan, telling him about things he should know in order to be able to drive safely, the primary emphasis being on railroad crossings: heeding signal lights, listening for train horns and being wary around double-track crossings. As Jackson finishes giving the advice, Frank Jr. and Betty return home. Alan asks his father if he can drive the car into town. His father lets him, and Frank Jr. and Betty agree to go with him to make sure he arrives safely.

Alan begins driving the car down the road, and sees Frank Jr. and Betty in front of him. They look behind to wave to Alan, and he waves back. However, the pair keep driving while looking backwards. Observing that a railroad with an oncoming train is near, Alan desperately tries to signal to them to stop waving and look ahead. When they do not pay attention to him and continue waving, Alan shields his eyes as the two drive right into the path of the train and are struck off-camera. In the aftermath, the car is wrecked on its side, a sheet is pulled over Frank’s nearby body, and Betty is on a gurney and being loaded into the rear of an ambulance by somber medics. Hal is one of the troopers that arrive on the scene of the accident and comforts Alan as he weeps over the death of his brother because he wasn't paying attention to the crossing signals or saw he was trying to warn him about the train approaching.

Back in the present, at the funeral, Hal enters his police car, determined to go back on the road in order to prevent more traffic accidents from occurring, notably in the name of convenient law breaking. When another driver speeds past him, Hal hits his siren and flasher and turns around to pursue him in hopes of preventing another family from suffering what the Dixons went through.

While the primary focus is on driver safety near railroad crossings, other basic driving safety rules are reinforced, such as not passing on hills or curves, not driving or pulling over when fatigued or sleepy and not being a distracted driver. Alan is also shown a police report of an accident where an acquaintance of his had died in an accident due to his reckless driving. Filling out the film is a nostalgic look back at the early 1900s, when such things as horseless carriages were parts of everyday life and four-lane superhighways—in the late 1950s still a relatively new concept—weren't even thought of, and slower and less congested roadways meant fewer dangers in driving; however, Hal cautions that his point is that the human body hasn't changed and that even more attention to safety must be heeded.

== Production ==
The entire film is in the public domain, as a copyright was never registered.

Last Clear Chance was produced and directed by Robert Carlisle. The production was supervised by Francis B. Lewis, who was the Union Pacific Railroad's Director of Safety and Courtesy. Assistance on research for the film was provided by staff of the National Safety Council. A note at the end of the film gives thanks to the Idaho State Police, the Colorado State Patrol, and their respective staffs for "their unstinted cooperation and assistance in making this film."

The film features William Boyett as police officer Hal Jackson. Frank Dixon, Sr. is played by Harold Agee, while his wife Suzanne (billed only as "Mrs. Harold Agee") plays the role of Mrs. Dixon. Future corporate executive William Agee, Harold's real-life son, plays Frank Dixon, Jr. with Christine Lynch appearing as his girlfriend, Betty Hutchins. Tim Bosworth was cast as Alan Dixon, and Lou Spraker plays the grandfather. The film, written by Leland Baxter, features a scenario that was inspired by a real-life family. Bert Spielvogel served as the cinematographer for Last Clear Chance, with Peter Norman working as assistant cameraman. Shot in Kodachrome.

Filming locations include:

≈ 0:40 - 1:57 and 23:25 - 23:47 Kohlerlawn Cemetery 300 6th St. N Nampa, Idaho (43°35'30.29"N 116°33'48.16"W)

≈2:29 - 3:12 Union Pacific depot, Meridian, Idaho; [demolished] (43°36'31.67"N 116°23'26.10"W)

≈3:13 - 3:33 Crossing at Main (First) St and Boise Valley RR MP 457.53 Meridian, ID (43°36'30.95"N 116°23'29.44"W)

≈19:18 - 19:31 Bridge (Avalon) St Kuna, ID at UP crossing MP 447.23 (43°29'20.82"N 116°25'15.11"W)

Main character Hal wears an Idaho State Police uniform. Mort Fallick was the film's editor.

Made five years after The Days of Our Years, another Union Pacific Railroad-sponsored safety film that was also spoofed by MST3K, Last Clear Chance was produced by Wondsel, Carlisle and Dunphy, Inc. in order to inform young drivers how to make sure to avoid accidents. Archivist, author, and filmmaker Rick Prelinger notes that the film also includes other themes, such as "a teen’s feeling of invulnerability, the police officer as authority figure, and the train’s dual role as economic partner and potential killer." Prelinger believes that "longer films aspire to higher goals, and one way to achieve these goals is to pack them with hints of meaning in many directions."

== Reception and legacy ==
Last Clear Chance was originally distributed only in western states that were served by Union Pacific. It was released in 16 mm film, and by 1960 was described as being "shown widely in all sections of the country." A copyright on the film was not registered, and it is in the public domain. A copy of the film is in the Prelinger Archives, and as such it is available to be freely downloaded or streamed from the Internet Archive.

The film was received positively by many people who worked in the safety industry, with it being reported that many of them considered it to be "the most moving and hard-hitting educational film on highway grade crossing accident prevention and traffic safety in recent years." It received an award at a national safety film contest. Rick Prelinger described the film as being "engaging" and opined that it was a "skillful drama." Bill Gibron of DVD Verdict branded the film as "hyper somber" and wrote that "we learn, finally, why reckless driving, trains, and painful automotive accidents don't mix. The question everyone keeps asking is 'Why don't they look?' The answer is simple. They're dopes!"

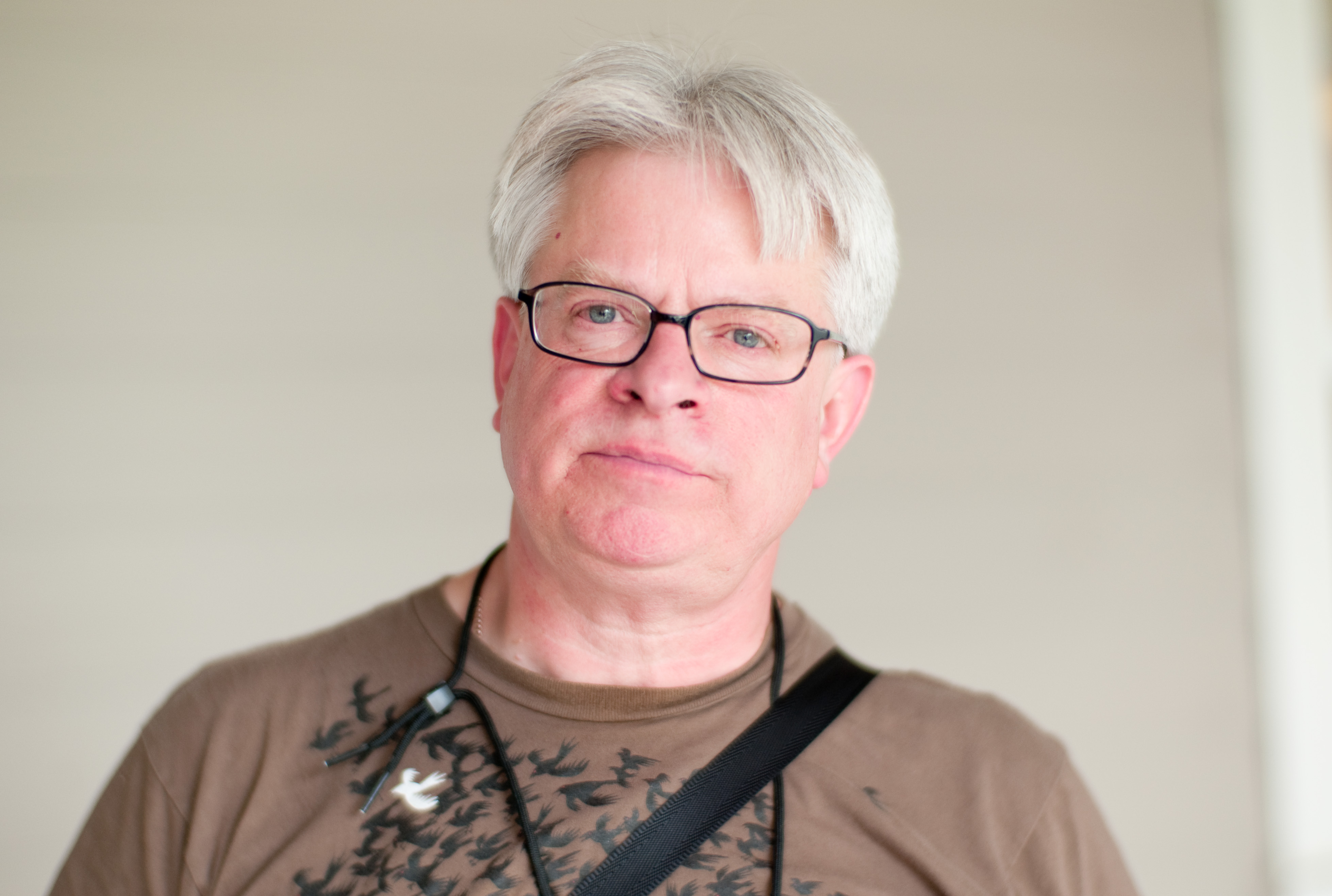
Rick Prelinger used clips from Last Clear Chance in his 2004 film Panorama Ephemera.

Last Clear Chance was featured in an episode of the comedy television series Mystery Science Theater 3000. Last Clear Chance appeared in the twentieth episode of the fifth season, which was broadcast on December 18, 1993. Last Clear Chance became a "huge hit" thanks to its appearance on the show, and it has been described as one of the "Mystery Science Theater 3000 favorites." Actor and writer Kevin Murphy, who plays Tom Servo on the show, opined that Last Clear Chance "is right up there with my all-time favorite shorts." Rhino Entertainment has released the segment featuring Last Clear Chance on VHS, as part of Mystery Science Theater 3000 - Shorts Volume 2. Shorts Volume 2 was later re-released on DVD in 2003, as part of Mystery Science Theater 3000 Collection, Volume 3.

Clips from Last Clear Chance are featured in 2004's Panorama Ephemera, a film created by Rick Prelinger which compiles clips from 64 short films in order to form a cohesive narrative. The clip used from Last Clear Chance is the scene where Frank Jr. and Betty drive into the path of an oncoming train. Panorama Ephemera can be downloaded or streamed for free at the Internet Archive.

It was also spoofed by RiffTrax, consisting of MST3K alumni Michael J. Nelson, Bill Corbett and the aforementioned Kevin Murphy, on August 9, 2022.

== Bibliography ==
- Beaulieu, Trace (April 1, 1996). The Mystery Science Theater 3000 Amazing Colossal Episode Guide. Bantam Books. ISBN 978-0-553-37783-5.
- Gale, Thomson (October 2007). Video Sourcebook: A Guide to Programs Currently Available on Video in the Areas Of: Movies/Entertainment, General Interest/Education, Sports/Recreation, Fine Arts, Heal. Gale / Cengage Learning. ISBN 978-1-4144-0099-0.
- National Safety Council (1960). Transactions - National Safety Congress.
- Prelinger, Rick (2006). The Field Guide to Sponsored Films. National Film Preservation Foundation. ISBN 978-0-9747099-3-2.
- Reinke, Steve; Taylor, Tom (January 1, 2000). Lux: A Decade of Artists' Film and Video. YYZ Books/Pleasure Dome. ISBN 9780920397268.
