= The Princess and the Pauper =

- Production companies: Jam Handy Organization; Chevrolet
- Distributed by: Jam Handy Organization (JHO)
- Release date: January 10, 1939 (United States)
- Running time: 7 minutes
- Country: United States
- Language: English

The film

The Princess and the Pauper is a 1939 Technicolor cartoon sponsored film by Chevrolet. It features Nicky Nome, who also appeared in the previous Chevrolet films A Coach for Cinderella and A Ride for Cinderella, as well as One Bad Knight, Nicky Rides Again and Peg-Leg Pedro. The Princess and the Pauper is in the public domain and runs for approximately ten minutes.

== Plot summary ==
A king offers his daughter's hand in marriage to the wealthiest suitor in the kingdom. She is wooed by the despicable wizard Ali Kazam, but falls for a pauper boy with a yo-yo. The boy is kicked out of the palace by the king's men, whereupon the diminutive magical creature Nicky Nome appears to help him, giving him a flying carpet to travel to a valley of jewels. When Ali Kazam attacks on a vulture, Nicky gradually transforms the carpet into a Chevrolet motor car.

== Cast ==
- Vincent Pelletier as the Narrator (voice)

== See also ==
- A Coach for Cinderella
- A Ride for Cinderella
- Peg-Leg Pedro
- Jam Handy
- Advertising
- Sponsored film
- List of films in the public domain in the United States
