= A Ride for Cinderella =

- Written by: Max Fleischer
- Produced by: Jamison Handy
- Release date: September 2, 1937
- Running time: 9 minutes
- Country: United States
- Language: English

A Ride for Cinderella is a 1937 Technicolor cartoon sponsored film, and is a sequel to A Coach for Cinderella.

== Storyline ==
Cinderella meets her young prince, but has to leave him when the clock turns to midnight. Meanwhile, the head dwarf, Nicky Nome, has to stop the wicked witch, hired by the evil stepsisters, from ruining Cinderella's chance of marrying the prince.

== Production ==
The cartoon is an advertisement for Chevrolet, and a Chevrolet that helps Cinderella get her prince. The cartoon was made by the Jam Handy Organization, famous for their advertising films. It is in the public domain.

== See also ==
- Chevrolet
- Jam Handy
- Fairy tales
- Advertising
- Sponsored film
- A Coach for Cinderella
- Peg-Leg Pedro
- The Princess and the Pauper
