= Megan Prelinger =

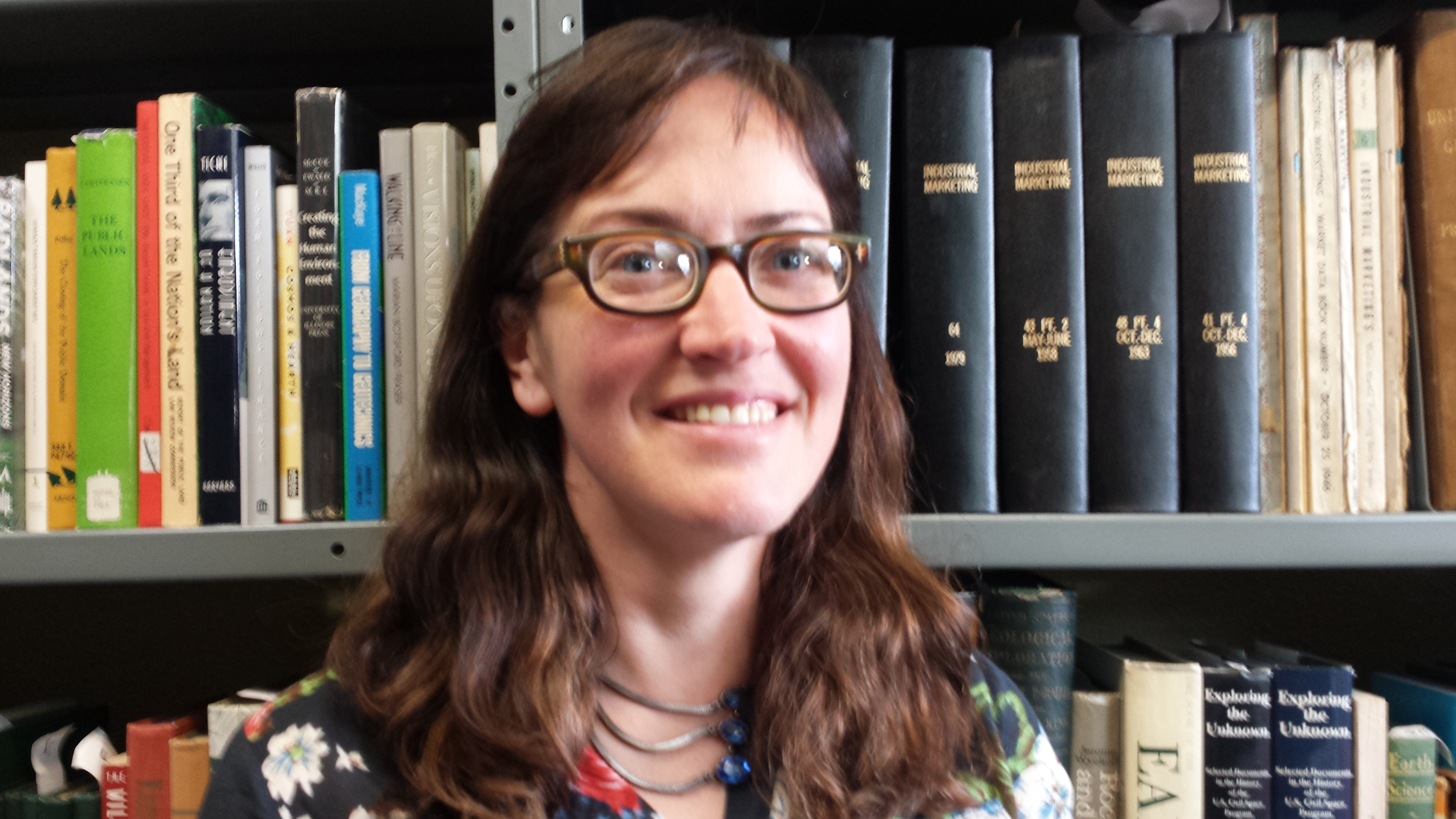
- Megan Prelinger at the Prelinger Library in San Francisco in 2014
- Born: September 25, 1967 (age 59); Yamhill County, Oregon

Academic background
- Education: Reed College

Academic work
- Main interests: Cultural history

Megan Prelinger (née Shaw; born September 25, 1967) is a cultural historian and archivist. She is the co-founder of the Prelinger Library in San Francisco and author of two books: Another Science Fiction: Advertising the Space Race 1957–1962 and Inside the Machine: Art and Invention in the Electronic Age.

== Background, archivist work ==
Prelinger is a fifth-generation Oregonian, born in Yamhill County and raised in Eugene. After graduating Reed College, she embarked on a set of solo road trips through the interior western United States, visiting "landscapes", which she defines as places, not necessarily famous in the conventional sense, that have a human resonance. Working independently, she pursued an academic interest in "ephemeral literature", looking for sources among the discarded material from libraries and the shelves of used book stores and considering what this body of work could reveal about American history.

Rick Prelinger, whose Prelinger Archives pursued similar goals as related to film, read two of her articles in the webzine/magazine Bad Subjects. They married in 1999. The Prelinger Library was launched in 2004 as the merging of their print collections and now contains more than 40,000 publications once thought to be of mere temporary interest: magazines, pamphlets, brochures and similar items that, said Megan, "contain micro-narratives, little stories that don't always make it into books."

In a 2007 Harper's Magazine profile, Gideon Lewis-Kraus described the Prelinger Library as "the command center" of the marriage, "which seems as much a matter of cerebral cultural gambits as of romance." Megan has "greater seriousness of the two" with "a flinty sort of temper, but it is not easy to say anything definitive, as she and Rick tend to freely exchange attributes." Megan is responsible for the library's unique classification system, which is centered on locality, beginning in the library's San Francisco location and ending in outer space. She designed the system to promote the serendipity of "browsing-based discoveries". For example, government documents are found next to their modern-day interpretations; satirical histories are shelved next to serious ones. "Subject-matter fiction is interspersed amongst nonfiction, and trade literature can sometimes stand for a whole topic." In 2010, the San Francisco Bay Guardian awarded the Prelingers a lifetime achievement "Goldies" award.

In 2013, the reopened Exploratorium science museum in San Francisco featured the Observatory Library, curated by the Prelingers, which includes five specially prepared atlases, as well as books, government documents, magazines, and videos that "explore natural and social forces that have impacted the bay's landscape."

== Writing ==
Prelinger's 2010 book, Another Science Fiction: Advertising the Space Race 1957–1962, was inspired by the contemporary advertising found in two publications: Aviation Week and Missiles and Rockets. The book chronicled an era described by Dennis Overbye in The New York Times as "'Mad Men' meets 'Flash Gordon'", a time when the future of space exploration was sometimes given to inflated predictions—lunar gardening and solar-powered space vehicles—as corporations attempted to emblazon their vision of the future and, more practically, drive employee recruitment. Overbye wrote that "it’s hard to know what to be more nostalgic about, all those childhood dreams of space opera or the optimism of an era in which imagination and technology were booming and every other ad ended with a pitch to come work for the thriving company of the future."

Research for the book began as a search for untold stories of the militarized American west and the development of the atomic bomb. As Prelinger read magazine articles of the time, she realized the advertisements "formed a visual language of their own that spoke to all the historical, ideological, and technological complexities that were embedded in the massive changes of the era in history." She views human spaceflight as a cultural project, not just an industrial one, with the advertisements embedding both goals.

Unusual among authors, Prelinger organizes her research using a database, describing herself as a FileMaker hobbyist. For Another Science Fiction, she spent a year cataloging images, eventually growing the database to about 600 records. The approach gave her a free-form medium for examining and sorting through the material using keyword searches, and the final structure varied considerably from how she first conceived it.

Prelinger's second book, Inside the Machine: Art and Invention in the Electronic Age, was published by W.W. Norton & Company in August 2015. The book chronicles the history of electronics from the 1930s to the 1960s and the corresponding work of artists who pictured those advances: in advertising for products, personnel recruitment and company branding, as well as magazine articles and other educational efforts. "Artists bridged the gap between invention and understanding, between business and industry, and between technology and the public." Prelinger wrote in the introduction. As with her previous book, she argues that art has the power to "create the world as we wish to see it."
