= Jam Handy =

American swimmer and entrepreneur (1886–1983)

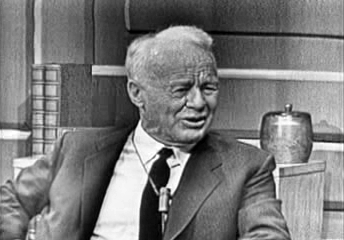
- Handy in 1966

Personal information
- Full name: Henry Jamison Handy
- Nickname: "Jam"
- National team: United States
- Born: March 6, 1886 Philadelphia, Pennsylvania, U.S.
- Died: November 13, 1983 (aged 97) Detroit, Michigan, U.S.

Sport
- Sport: Swimming
- Strokes: Breaststroke, freestyle
- Club: Chicago Central YMCA; Chicago Athletic Association; Illinois Athletic Club
- Coach: William Bachrach (Illinois AC)
Medal record
Representing the United States
Olympic Games
Men's swimming
Bronze medal – third place	1904 St. Louis	440-yard breaststroke
Men's water polo
Bronze medal – third place	1924 Paris	Team competition

Henry Jamison "Jam" Handy (March 6, 1886 – November 13, 1983) was an American Olympic breaststroke swimmer, water polo player, and entrepreneur. He is the founder of the Jam Handy Organization (JHO), a producer of commercially sponsored motion pictures, slidefilms (later known as filmstrips), trade shows, industrial theater and multimedia training aids. Credited as the first person to imagine distance learning, Handy made his first film in 1910 and presided over a company that produced an estimated 7,000 motion pictures and perhaps as many as 100,000 slidefilms before it was dissolved in 1983.

== Athletic achievements ==
Handy was the American Athletic Union long distance swim champion for three years beginning in 1907, and won national championships in all three strokes, prior to the introduction of the butterfly. As a noted innovator in improving stroke methodology, he was one of the first swimmers to use an alternate arm entry style in the backstroke, was instrumental in introducing the Australian crawl to American competition and helped introduce the 2 or 4 beat kick to ease the strain on middle-distance swimmers. While working for the Chicago Tribune, he was a member of both the Chicago Athletic Association and the Illinois Athletic Club, though while working at the Tribune, he often swam in the early morning hours at Chicago's Central YMCA.

He later pioneered the use of film in analyzing and improving stroke technique and positioning. Handy was a talented athlete in water polo and participated in the AAU Sr. National Water Polo Championship in outdoor competition in 1921 and 1923. He competed and trained in Water Polo with the Chicago Central Y, and later with the Illinois Athletic Club's strong program from around 1915–1928.

== Olympics ==
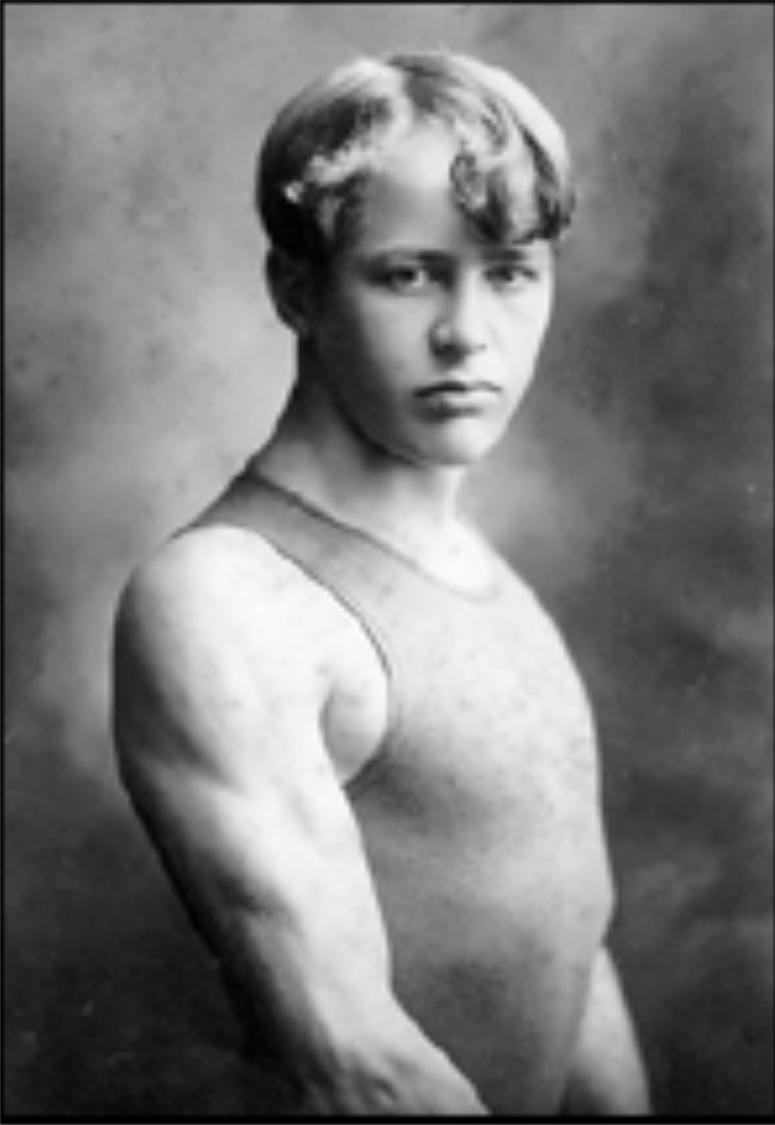
Handy at the 1904 Olympics

Handy swam in the 1904 Olympics in St. Louis, where he placed 3rd in the 440-yard breaststroke, winning the bronze medal. The distance had rarely been swum in Olympic competition and there were originally few entrants. Handy decided to participate shortly before the event, and in the final heat touched just an instant before Georg Hoffmann of Germany, who placed fourth on the heels of Handy. Handy placed sixth in the 880-yard freestyle, and in non-medal events, placed 2nd in the 880 yard handicap, and third in the one mile handicap.

He was selected as an alternate as part of the U.S. Water polo team coached by William Bachrach selected primarily from the Illinois Athletic Club at the 1924 Olympics in Paris, France. The U.S. team won a bronze medal, though Handy was unable to compete in the final. In the final match, the American team took third place in an unexpected 3–2 victory over the Swedish team. With his participation, he established a new record for the longest period of time between first and last Olympic competitions.

Handy appeared swimming in a commercial from 1978 asking for the public to support American athletes training for the 1980 Olympic games before the boycott. At the time of his filming, he was the oldest living United States Olympic medalist.

=== Athletic honors ===
In 1965, Handy was inducted into the International Swimming Hall of Fame. In 1977, he was inducted into the USA Water Polo Hall of Fame. He was admitted to the prestigious Helms Foundation Swimming Hall of Fame in 1960.

== Education and early career ==
Handy attended North Division High School in Chicago, and then the University of Michigan during the 1902–03 academic year. During that time he was working as a campus correspondent for the Chicago Tribune when on May 8 he wrote an article about a lecture in the Elocution 2 class given by Prof. Thomas C. Trueblood as a "course in lovemaking." Handy went on to describe how Trueblood had dropped to a bended knee in order to demonstrate how to make an effective marriage proposal. John T. McCutcheon, a Chicago Record Herald cartoonist, followed the next day with a cartoon about a "Professor Foxy Truesport" showing his class how to best have sex.

Neither Trueblood nor university President James B. Angell were amused. Ten days after the initial article was published, Handy was suspended for a year for "publishing false and injurious statements affecting the character of the work of one of the Professors." Handy was told he could re-apply one year later. Instead, Handy decided to apply to a different school, but he was unable to gain acceptance to other schools because of what had happened at the University of Michigan. Handy was accepted to the University of Pennsylvania but was told to leave after two weeks of classes.

Tribune editor Medill McCormick tried to intervene on Handy's behalf, but Angell refused to change the suspension. At that point, McCormick offered Handy a job. Handy worked in a number of departments at the Tribune. It was during his time working on the advertising staff that Handy observed that informing and building up salespeople's enthusiasm for the products they were selling helped to move more merchandise. He also began researching exactly what made people buy a particular product.

Handy left the Tribune to do further work on corporate communications. He worked with John H. Patterson of National Cash Register, who had used slides to help train workers. With help from another associate, Handy began making and distributing films that showed consumers how to operate everyday products. After World War I broke out, Handy began making films to show how to operate military equipment. During this time the Jam Handy Organization was formed.

== Marriage ==
Handy was married to Helen Hoag Rogers and had five children. One of his daughter Chaille's children is the printmaker Garner Tullis. Another of his daughter Chaille's children is the inventor Barclay J. Tullis.

== Filmmaking ==
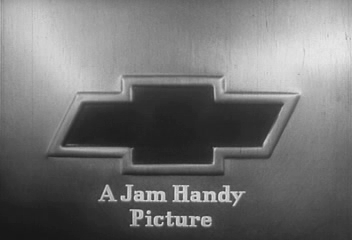
End title of the 1930s Mass Selling films, produced by the Jam Handy Organization for Chevrolet Motor Company, which showed a spinning Chevrolet hubcap coming to a stop

After World War I, Handy was the Chicago-Detroit industrial representative for Bray Productions, creating films for the auto industry, Bray's largest private client.

General Motors selected Handy's organization to produce short training films as well as other training and promotional materials. One such film was 1940's Hired! – a training film for sales managers at Chevrolet dealerships; which is also featured in the Mystery Science Theater 3000 episodes Bride of the Monster and Manos: The Hands of Fate. Many films produced by the Jam Handy Organization were collected by Prelinger Archives and may be seen and downloaded at the Internet Archive.

Master Hands, the legendary 1936 documentary sponsored film (or as was called a "capitalist realist drama"), was selected by the National Film Registry for preservation in 1999.

Between 1936 and 1938, the Jam Handy Organization made a series of six animated fantasy sales films for Chevrolet featuring a gnome named Nicky Nome, which showed new Chevrolet automobiles saving the day from villains, often in retellings of classic tales such as Cinderella, the subject of two of those films, A Coach for Cinderella and A Ride for Cinderella. The other films were Nicky Rides Again, Peg-Leg Pedro, The Princess and the Pauper, and One Bad Knight.

The Jam Handy Organization produced the first animated version of the new Christmas story Rudolph the Red-Nosed Reindeer (1948), sponsored by retailer Montgomery Ward and directed by Max Fleischer.

Handy also produced films for other companies and for schools. He's estimated to have produced over 7,000 films for the armed services during World War II. Handy was noted for taking only a one-percent profit on the films, while he could have taken as much as seven percent. He was noted for never having a desk at work, instead using any available workspace. Handy's suits did not have pockets, as he thought they were a waste of time.

== Degrees ==
Despite Handy's troubles with the University of Michigan, his son-in-law Max Mallon, granddaughter Susan Webb, and great-granddaughter Kathryn Tullis received degrees from the school. Handy would receive an honorary doctorate from Eastern Michigan University.

== Death ==
Handy died in Detroit on November 13, 1983, at the age of 97. He swam on a regular basis until just a few days before his death. Prior to his death, he was the last living medalist of the 1904 Olympic Games.

The Jam Handy advertising and marketing firm was displaced by Campbell Ewald as General Motors' principal advertising agency. The loss of those funds was responsible, during the year of his death, for the demise of Handy's agency, which had been located on East Grand Blvd in Detroit.

== Archival sources ==
Handy's personal papers and the surviving Jam Handy Organization records are housed at the Burton Historical Collection at the Detroit Public Library. His family and ancestry are featured in a historical collection held at the William L. Clements Library at the University of Michigan. The Clements Library also published a book titled Annals and Memorials of the Handys and Their Kindred by Isaac W.K. Handy, edited by Mildred Handy Ritchie and Sarah Rozelle Handy Mallon (Ann Arbor, 1992). An hour-long interview with Jamison Handy (published December 26, 1961) is available at Internet Archive.

== See also ==
- List of Olympic medalists in swimming (men)
- List of Olympic medalists in water polo (men)
- List of members of the International Swimming Hall of Fame
- Industrial film
- Collage film
