= Prelinger Library =

Serendipity library in San Francisco

Coordinates: 37°46′29″N 122°24′34″W

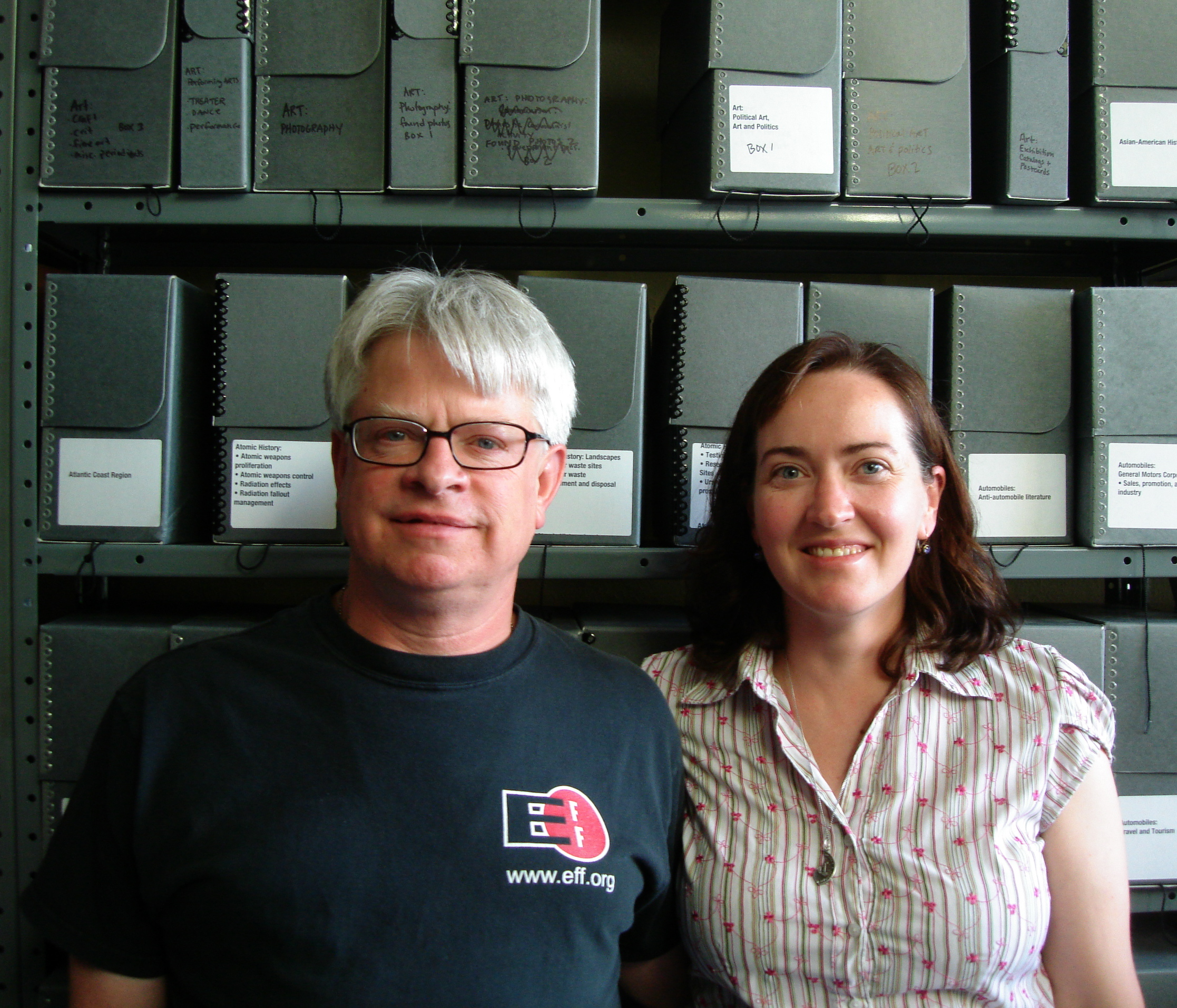
Rick and Megan Prelinger, founders of the Library

The Prelinger Library is a privately funded public library in San Francisco founded in 2004 and operated by Megan Prelinger and Rick Prelinger. It holds over 50,000 books, periodicals and pieces of print ephemera. Prelinger Library considers itself a "hybrid library" that blurs the distinction between digital and non-digital; as of 2009 it had over 3,700 e-books online and has been digitizing much of its collection.

The Prelingers were able to take advantage of lower rents after the dot-com bust to rent the space for the library. By its fourth year, the library was hosting approximately 1,000 visitors annually. Visitors are encouraged to drink complimentary tea and chat with other guests about what they have found.

== Collection ==
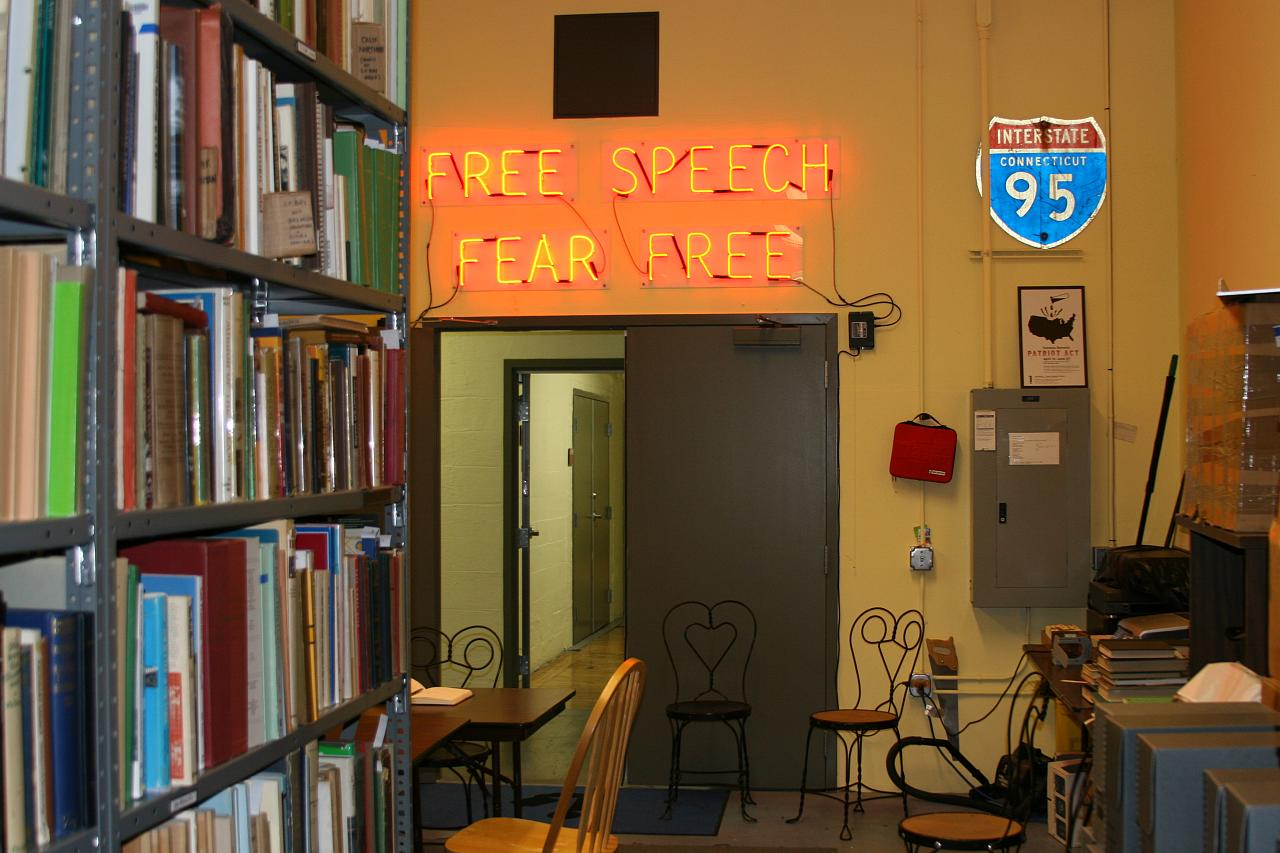
Interior of Prelinger Library, showing the artwork "Patriot Act" by Rankin Renwick, the neon “Free / Speech / Fear / Free” sign that hangs above the door

The library is unusual in that it uses a custom system of organization designed by Megan that intends to facilitate and emphasize browsing and does not allow books to be checked-out. For example, the section on "Suburbia" is next to the section on "Domestic Environments", then "Architecture", which becomes "Graphic Design", which in turn leads to "Typography" and "Fine Arts", and then "Advertising" and "Sales". Some of the other themes include San Francisco, space, transportation, art history, landscape, photography and museums. Megan Prelinger has her own organization system that is different from the Dewey Decimal Classification system and there is no card catalog. In 2010, the Prelingers used a 'Geo-spatial taxonomy', organizing books on states, for example, geographically with Alaska at the top left and Florida at the bottom.

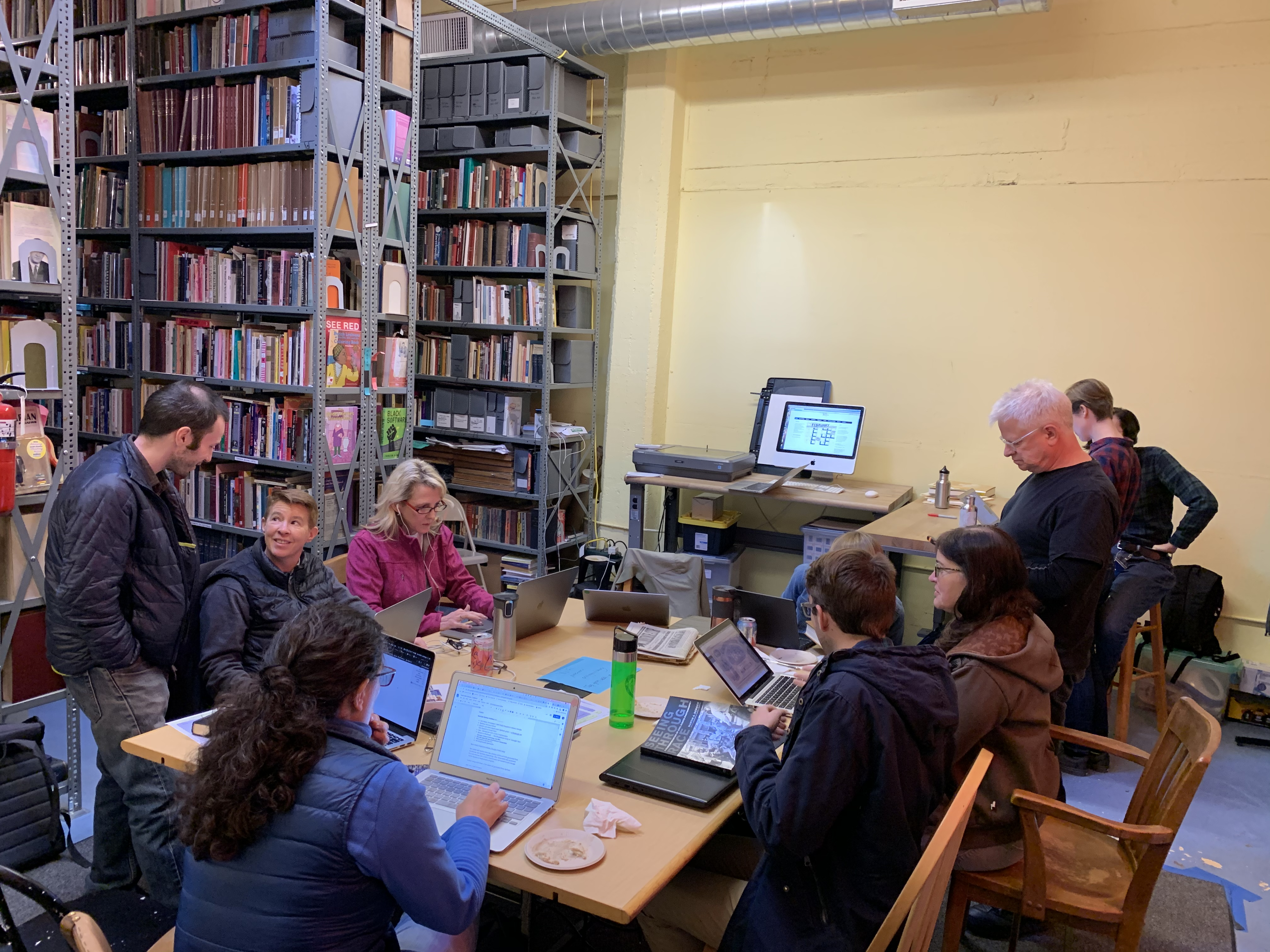
Workspace in the library

The library was inspired in part by the Warburg Institute Library in London, founded by German art historian Aby Warburg. His disciple Fritz Saxl wrote: "The overriding idea was that the books together—each containing its larger or smaller bit of information and being supplemented by its neighbors—should by their titles guide the student to perceive the essential forces of the human mind and its history." Warburg built his library to find connections and relationships between antiquity and the Renaissance. Likewise, the Prelingers' library in part addresses the relationships among intellectual property, the evolution of media and cultural production.

Prelinger is a "serendipity" library, a library that emphasizes the experience of browsing and discovering things that were formerly unknown. The library can also be seen as a counterbalance to modern public libraries, which, as part of digital-library initiatives, emphasize computers and databases and are no longer a "mere warehouse for books". Megan Prelinger said the library is "a local workshop, not an institution. We serve tea, and we encourage photography and scanning and any other form of non-destructive appropriation. That kind of environment is very natural to people in the millennial generation and people who have grown up during the resurgence of craft and DIY spaces." Some of those who say the library has inspired their creative work include authors Jenny Odell, Gary Kamiya and Annalee Newitz.

As of 2015, it held roughly "30,000 bound objects, 60,000 loose sheets and another 10,000 zines." Rick and Megan Prelinger started collecting in 1982, and would source many of the books came from libraries that no longer wanted them, as well as private brokers, donors and e-Bay. They prioritized books with images or that focused on subjects you were less likely to find in other libraries. The library itself is 72 feet deep with 14-foot high shelves.

== See also ==
- Mechanics' Institute, San Francisco
- Prelinger Archives
