= Peg-Leg Pedro =

1938 film

Peg-Leg Pedro is a 1938 Technicolor cartoon sponsored film.

== Summary ==
A boy and girl on a trip are attacked by pirates while looking for treasure. It features the character Nicky Nome.

== Production ==
The cartoon is actually an advertisement for Chevrolet. It is a spin-off of A Coach for Cinderella & A Ride for Cinderella. The film is in the public domain.

== See also ==
- A Coach for Cinderella
- A Ride for Cinderella
- The Princess and the Pauper
- Chevrolet
- Jam Handy
- Advertising
- Sponsored film
