= The Heart of Cleveland =

1924 film

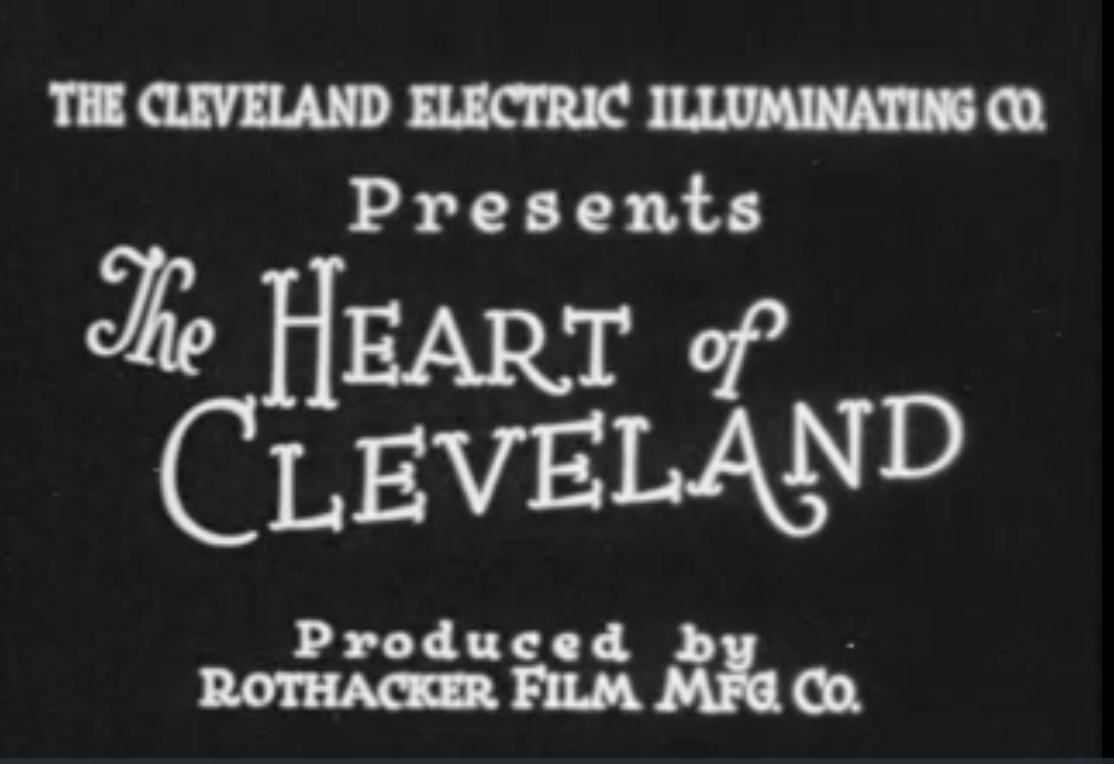
- Directed by: John Freese
- Story by: Frank J. Ryan
- Starring: The boy – Billy Redmond. The girl – Lorraine Schmidt. The aviator – Ted Mars. The aviator’s sister – Dede Fitzpatrick. The farmers – Mr. and Mrs. Frank Van Arnsdale. The Illuminating Company representative – A. H. McKenzie
- Production companies: Rothacker Film Manufacturing Company (Chicago, Illinois)
- Distributed by: Cleveland (Ohio) Electric Illuminating Company (CEI)
- Release date: 1924
- Running time: 29 minutes
- Country: United States
- Language: Silent

The Heart of Cleveland is a twenty-nine-minute silent film released in 1924 sponsored by the Cleveland Illuminating Company (CEI) and produced by Rothacker Film Manufacturing Company.

A 1925 article about the film in the Cleveland Plain Dealer reported that the mystery around generating and distributing electricity had been "made as clear as chopping wood by a motion picture, just produced which has been exhibited in various parts of Cleveland."

In addition to the social impacts related to electric power and its impact on new technologies for the home, the film tells an important story related to industrial history. When the film was made, CEI had just installed its first pulverized coal-burning boilers at Lake Shore—the first in Ohio and much more efficient than older boilers.

In 1925, the company installed the largest steam turbine in the world at the time. Lake Shore's output jumped to 284,000 kilowatts. Pulverized coal became the standard method for coal-burning power plants in the 20th century. The CEI Lake Shore power station operations demonstrate the mass-scale technology necessary to increase electricity availability in the U.S.

In 2021, the National Film Preservation Foundation awarded the Hagley Museum and Library a grant to preserve a copy of the film.

== Synopsis of film ==
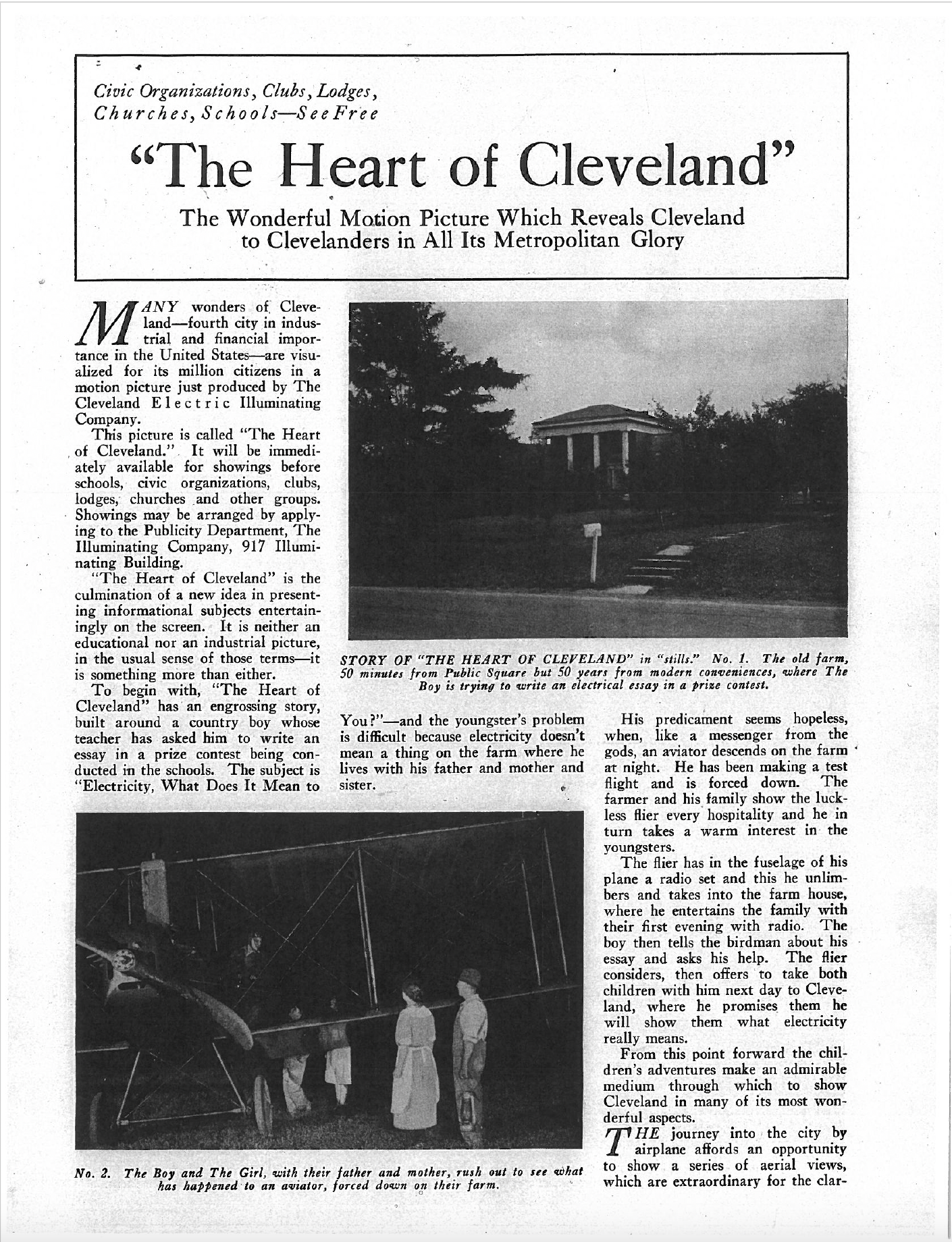
Page 2 of Illuminating Company (Cleveland, Ohio) brochure on the making of the 1924 silent film "The Heart of Cleveland"

The Heart of Cleveland opens on a farm "fifty minutes from the [Cleveland] Public Square but fifty years from modern improvements." The principal characters, two young children, are doing their chores while the mother prepares dinner on a wood-burning stove.

While eating dinner, the boy announces that he has to write a school essay on electricity, and the father confesses he isn't going to be able to do much to help. At that moment, a mail plane makes a forced landing in the yard of the farm. With his portable radio set, the pilot gives the family its first introduction to wireless. The pilot joins the family for dinner and offers to take the children to Cleveland the following day to learn about electricity and how it works.

The children embark on a two-day tour of an electrified Cleveland, with stops at modernized homes, offices, even CEI’s Lake Shore Station itself, the “world’s largest steam-electric” plant. They see the many elements of electric power production during a tour of the plant. The film ends with the boy learning by radio that he won the prize with his electricity essay. The farm family settles into their newly electrified home courtesy of the expanded rural electric service of the Cleveland Electric Illuminating Company.

Through the eyes of the two children, the film's narrative demonstrates how miraculous it must have been to see things like a radio and the phonograph for the first time. Many of the inventions and innovations highlighted throughout the film were less than twenty-five years old at the time.

== Cast ==
The boy – Billy Redmond The girl – Lorraine Schmidt The aviator – Ted Mars The aviator’s sister – Dede Fitzpatrick The farmers – Mr. and Mrs. Frank Van Arnsdale The Illuminating representative – A. H. McKenzie

== Production and background ==
The movie was shot on location throughout the city of Cleveland and includes aerial footage of downtown Cleveland and the surrounding areas. More broadly, the film represents a period before the now near-ubiquitous electrified home—a time when electricity was still considered a luxury for many. The film demonstrates the wonders of a wired home, showing how it made artificial light possible and introduced a slew of new household appliances such as vacuums and washing machines.

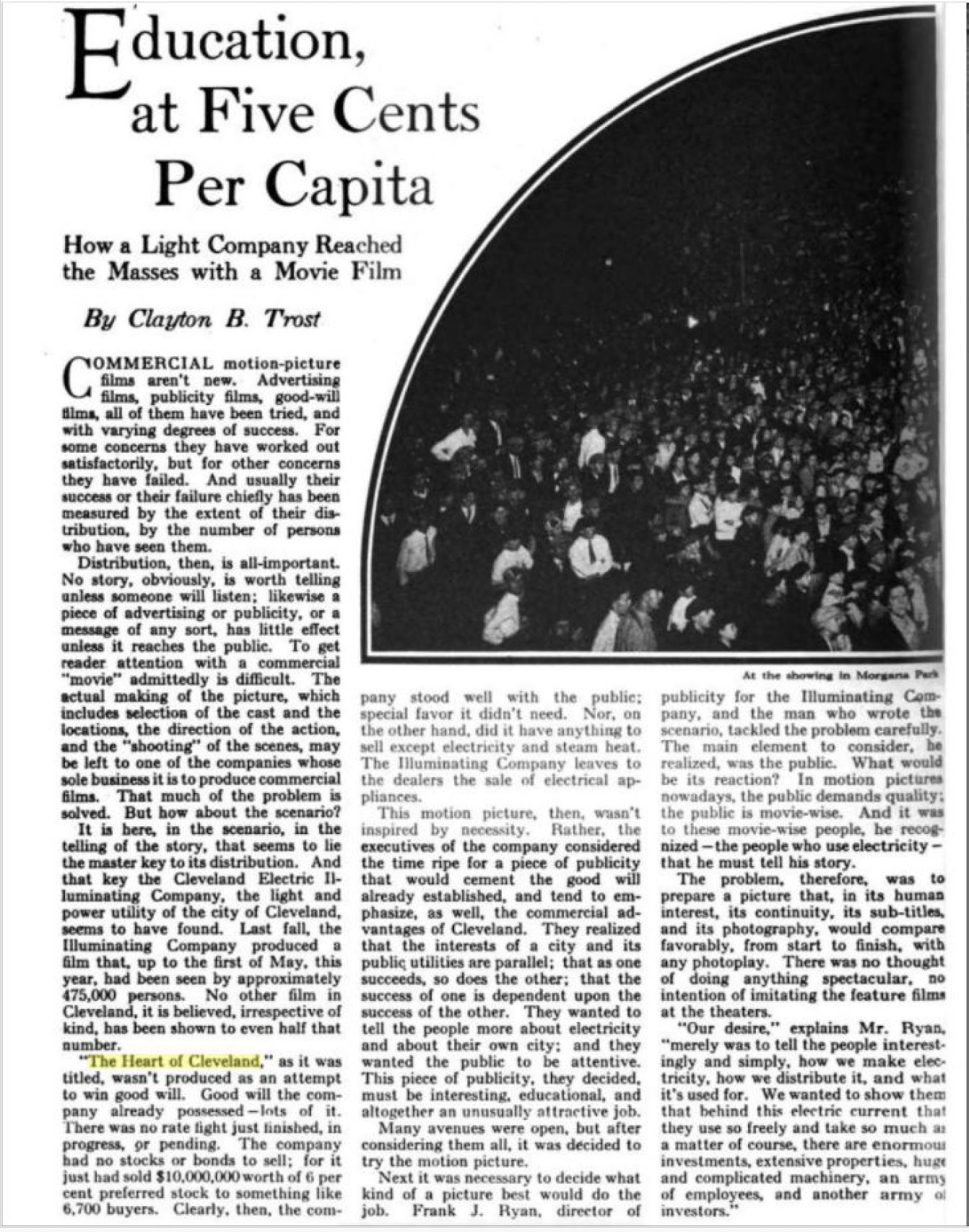
An article on the film in the July 1925 issue of Business noted that in the first six months of 1925, 475,000 people had seen the movie – 230,000 in theatres and 245,000 at other showings. It had run in over 122 theatres.

An article on the film in the July 1925 issue of Business noted that in the first six months of 1925, 475,000 people had seen the movie – 230,000 in theatres and 245,000 at other showings. It had run in over 122 theatres. When it played in the Cleveland Civic Auditorium, it packed the building – 19,000 people – the biggest crowd in its history. It was also shown to 5th graders and older in every school with an auditorium in the Cleveland school system.

In 2021, the National Film Preservation Foundation, an independent, nonprofit organization created by the U.S. Congress to help save America's film heritage, awarded the Hagley Museum and Library a grant to preserve a copy of the film found in the Library’s Cinécraft Productions sponsored film collection.

== See also ==
- Rural electrification
- National Film Preservation Foundation
