= William Boyett =

American actor (1927–2004)

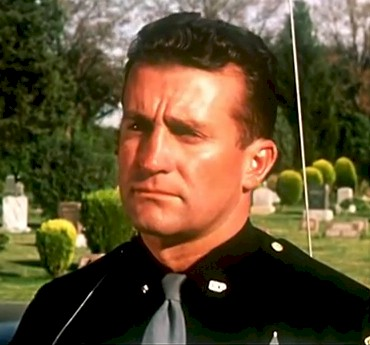
- Boyett in the Public Safety Council film Last Clear Chance (1959)
- Born: Harry William Boyett; January 3, 1927; Akron, Ohio, U.S.
- Died: December 29, 2004 (aged 77); Mission Hills, California, U.S.
- Occupation: Actor
- Years active: 1951–1998
- Spouses: Willagene Wither (1947–1950); Joan Reynolds (1957–2004) (his death) (2 children)
- Children: One daughter, one son

Harry William Boyett (January 3, 1927 – December 29, 2004) was an American actor best known for his roles in law enforcement dramas on television from the 1950s through the 1990s.

== Early years ==
Boyett was born in Akron, Ohio, the son of Harry Lee and Darcy Stafford. Harry Lee's parents were Dorsey H. and Carrie Evelyn Flowers, who married in McLennan County, Texas, on July 9, 1899. Dorsey and Carrie lived in Waco, Fort. Worth and San Antonio, Texas. Boyett often played roles of characters in uniform. His paternal grandfather, Dorsey, participated in the Spanish American War as a corporal in Company F, 2nd Texas Infantry and was also stationed in Laredo, Texas, in 1917, in charge of all non-commissioned officers in Company M, 37th Infantry, while the United States was in conflict with Mexico.

Carrie remarried and in the 1930 U.S. Census, Harry William is enumerated as "Harry" with Carrie, William Cason, and his older brother, Wallace, at 2103 Proctor Avenue in Waco, Texas. Harry William, who was then known as Harry, attended Waco High School, where he was active in theater, the Rostra Literary Society, the Junior Classical League, Boys Chorus, and as a junior was a Texas Interscholastic League contestant in Declamation. While at Dorsey High School in Los Angeles, he won a Shakespeare competition, which led to acting jobs in radio. The 1940 U.S. Census shows that although he was living in Los Angeles on April 1, 1935, he had returned to Waco, and he was again living with his grandmother, Carrie, and his step-grandfather, William Cason. He later permanently moved with his family to Los Angeles, California.

His father, Harry Lee Boyett, served in World War I in the U.S. Navy. Harry Lee married Margaret on September 4, 1925, in St. Clair County, Michigan, while working as a rubber worker. On a ship's registry sailing from Havana to New Orleans, in October of 1932, he listed his address as Paramount in Hollywood, California. It also reports his birth date is February 15, 1899, and he was born in Waco. He died at age 36 after having emergency surgery. He and his mother, Carrie, are buried in Rosemound Cemetery, in Waco.

== Military service ==
Boyett served in the Navy during World War II and afterward performed on the stage in both New York City and Los Angeles.

== Television ==
In 1954, Boyett played respected settler Jim Hardwicke in the Death Valley Days episode "11,000 Miners Can't Be Wrong". Boyett was typecast as a law-enforcement officer, most notably as Dan Mathews (Broderick Crawford)'s patrol officer on Highway Patrol, where he appeared in 65 episodes, either as Sgt. Johnson or Sgt. Williams, between 1955 and 1959; Boyett also portrayed a policeman in such diverse series as Gang Busters; The Man Behind the Badge; I Led 3 Lives; M Squad; The Detectives; Sea Hunt; Bat Masterson; Batman; Gomer Pyle - U.S.M.C.; and Star Trek: The Next Generation.

Jack Webb, the executive producer of Adam-12, selected Boyett for the role of LAPD Sergeant “Mac" MacDonald after several performances (such as playing Sgt. Sam Hunter) in both iterations of Webb's Dragnet. (Boyett can also be seen uncredited as a bailiff in the 1954 movie version.) Boyett appeared as MacDonald on Adam-12 for its entire 1968–1975 run.

He also made eight guest appearances on CBS's Perry Mason throughout the series' nine-year run, mostly in law-enforcement roles. In 1962, he played slain police officer Otto Norden in "The Case of the Hateful Hero". The defendant was his rookie partner James Anderson played by Richard Davalos, cousin of series regular Lt. Anderson played by Wesley Lau. He also played a corporate executive, Buck Osborn, in the 1961 episode "The Case of the Renegade Refugee". In the 1961 My Three Sons episode "Fire Watch", he was a forest ranger.

Boyett appeared in a number of television programs, such as Official Detective, Navy Log, Laramie, Tales of the Texas Rangers, I Spy, The Man from U.N.C.L.E. (uncredited; "The Secret Sceptre Affair" from 1965), The Andy Griffith Show, Family Affair, Fantasy Island, The Love Boat, The Rockford Files, The A-Team, Gunsmoke (S7E24’s “Coventry”), Knight Rider, Space Patrol, Rescue 8, Whirlybirds, Ripcord, Murphy Brown and Night Court. He also appeared in numerous episodes of Emergency! as Chief McConnikee of Los Angeles County Fire Department's Battalion 14. Boyett appeared as Dr. Dupree in 3 episodes of How the West Was Won in 1978.

== Film ==
Boyett also acted in several motion pictures, such as The Hidden (1987) and The Rocketeer (1991). Boyett earned much praise for his highly unusual role in The Hidden as a hospital patient named Jonathan P. Miller, possessed by an alien being with a taste for red Ferraris and rock and roll music. He also appeared in a well-known short public safety film entitled Last Clear Chance (1959) as Patrolman Hal Jackson. Interest in the film was renewed by its appearance in a 1993 episode of Mystery Science Theater 3000. Boyett's other small roles as a police officer include the crime dramas Vice Squad (1953) with Edward G. Robinson and Shield For Murder (1954) with Edmond O'Brien.

== Death ==
Boyett died December 29, 2004, in Mission Hills, California, five days before his 78th birthday, from complications of pneumonia and kidney failure.

== Filmography ==
- Street Bandits (1951) as Detective (uncredited)
- Without Warning! (1952) as Cop Hit by Martin (uncredited)
- Torpedo Alley (film) (1952) as Submariner (uncredited)
- By the Light of the Silvery Moon (1953) as Miss LaRue's Associate (uncredited)
- So This Is Love (1953) as George Gershwin (uncredited)
- Vice Squad (1953) as Officer Kellogg (uncredited)
- Return from the Sea (1954) as Sailor (uncredited)
- Dragnet (1954) as Grand Jury Bailiff (uncredited)
- Shield for Murder (1954) as Policeman Cooper (uncredited)
- Private Hell 36 (1955) as Mr. Stinson (uncredited)
- Big House, U.S.A. (1955) as Ranger at Park Exit (uncredited)
- Strange Lady in Town (1955) as Lieutenant Keith (uncredited)
- Running Wild (1955) as Minor Role (uncredited)
- Inside Detroit (1956) as Blair U.A.W. Friend (uncredited)
- Forbidden Planet (1956) as Crewman (uncredited)
- Somebody Up There Likes Me (1956) as Military Policeman Escort at Fight (uncredited)
- Francis in the Haunted House (1956) as Kissing Man (uncredited)
- Behind the High Wall (1956) as Policeman (uncredited)
- Beyond a Reasonable Doubt (1956) as Staff (uncredited)
- Fighting Trouble (1956) as Chips Conroy (uncredited)
- Emergency Hospital (1956) as Mike - Traffic Officer (uncredited)
- Until They Sail (1957) as U.S. Marine (uncredited)
- Young and Dangerous (1957) as Pier Cop (uncredited)
- Big-Foot Wallace (1957, TV Movie) as First Prisoner
- The Lady Takes a Flyer (1958) as Flight Mechanic (uncredited)
- As Young as We Are (1958) as Eric (uncredited)
- Tarawa Beachhead (1958) as Ullman (uncredited)
- Last Clear Chance (1959 Safety Film) as Officer Hal Jackson
- It Started with a Kiss (1959) as Alec (uncredited)
- Who Was That Lady? (1960) as Howard (uncredited)
- Sea Hunt (1958-1960, TV Series) as Policeman / Assistant District Attorney / Police Lieutenant / Paul Garrick / Spy / Saboteur / Mr. Hanson / Eddie Mahar / Newscast / Delmar
- My Three Sons TV series (8 Jun 1961) as Joe Mitchell in "Firewatch" / (25 Nov 1965) as Coach in "My Son, the Ballerina" / (16 Feb 1967) as Cowboy in "My Son, the Bullfighter" / (10 Feb 1968) as Captain in "Dear Enemy"
- That Girl "The Mail Man Cometh" (Season 2, Episode 12, 11/30/1967, TV Series) as photographer
- Sam Whiskey (1969) as Corporal
- Airport (1970) as Jack Ingram
- Vanished (1971, TV Mini-Series) as Commander Prescott
- Mobile Two (1975, TV Movie) as Lieutenant Don Carter
- Gemini Man (1976, TV Mini-Series) as 1st Officer
- Emergency! (1976-1978, TV Series) as Chief McConnike, Battalion 14 / Battalion Chief #14 / Captain, Station #39
- Washington: Behind Closed Doors (1977, TV Mini-Series) as Hard Hat
- Confessions of the D.A. Man (1978, TV Movie)
- Every Girl Should Have One (1978) as Detective Rand
- Ike: The War Years (1979, TV Mini-Series) as General Ward Hoffenberg
- When a Stranger Calls (1979) as Sergeant Sacher
- The Golden Gate Murders (1979, TV Movie) as Bridge Supervisor
- Bloody Birthday (1981)
- Space Raiders (1983) as Taggert
- The Christmas Tree Train (1983, TV Movie) as Ranger Jones (voice)
- Getting Physical (1984, TV Movie) as Desk Sergeant
- Sam's Son (1984) as Coach Sutter
- Which Witch Is Which (1984, TV Movie) as Ranger Jones (voice)
- The Turkey Caper (1985, TV Movie) as Ranger Jones (voice)
- The Deliberate Stranger (1986, TV Movie) as Aspen Detective
- Native Son (1986) as Reporter #3
- The Young and the Restless (1986) as Walter Edmonson
- The Hidden (1987) as Jonathan P. Miller
- Gypsy Angels (1990) as Mr. Allman
- The Rocketeer (1991) as Government Liaison
- Strays (1991, TV Movie) as Dr. Lyle Sokol
- The Wish That Changed Christmas (1991, TV Movie) as Officer Jones (voice)
- Newsies (1992) as Judge Movealong Monahan
- Girls in Prison (1994, TV Movie) as Dr. Shainmark
- Blood Run (1994, TV Movie) as Briskin
- Theodore Rex (1995) as Desk Sergeant
- The Adventure Machine (2000, TV movie) as Ranger Jones (voice)

== Selected Television ==
Year	Title	Role	Notes
1953	Death Valley Days	Jim Hardwicke	Episode "11,000 Miners Can't Be Wrong"
1955	Highway Patrol	Sergeant Johnson or Sergeant Williams	46 Episodes
1957	Alfred Hitchcock Presents	Captain Davidson	Season 3 Episode 5: "Silent Witness"
1959	Have Gun - Will Travel		Season 4, Episode 7 "Fragile"
1961	My Three Sons	Joe Mitchell	Season 1 Episode 36: "Firewatch"
1963	The Alfred Hitchcock Hour	Radio Operator	Season 2 Episode 9: "The Dividing Wall"
1964	The Alfred Hitchcock Hour	Young Policeman	Season 2 Episode 21: "Beast in View"
1965	Gunsmoke	Jake - rich rancher	Season 10 Episode 31: “Gilt Guilt”
1965	My Three Sons	Coach	Season 6 Episode 10: "My Son, the Ballerina"
1966	Get Smart	Skipper	Season 2, Episode 9 "Rub-a-Dub-Dub...Three Spies in a Sub"
1967	My Three Sons	Cowboy	Season 7 Episode 21: "My Son, the Bullfighter"
1968	My Three Sons	Captain	Season 8 Episode 23: "Dear Enemy"
1968	Adam-12	Sergeant Mac Donald	127 Episodes
1972	Mission: Impossible	Louis Parnell	Episode "Leona"
1988	Star Trek: The Next Generation	Lieutenant Dan Bell	Season 1, Episode 12 "The Big Goodbye"
