= William Agee =

American businessman (1938–2017)

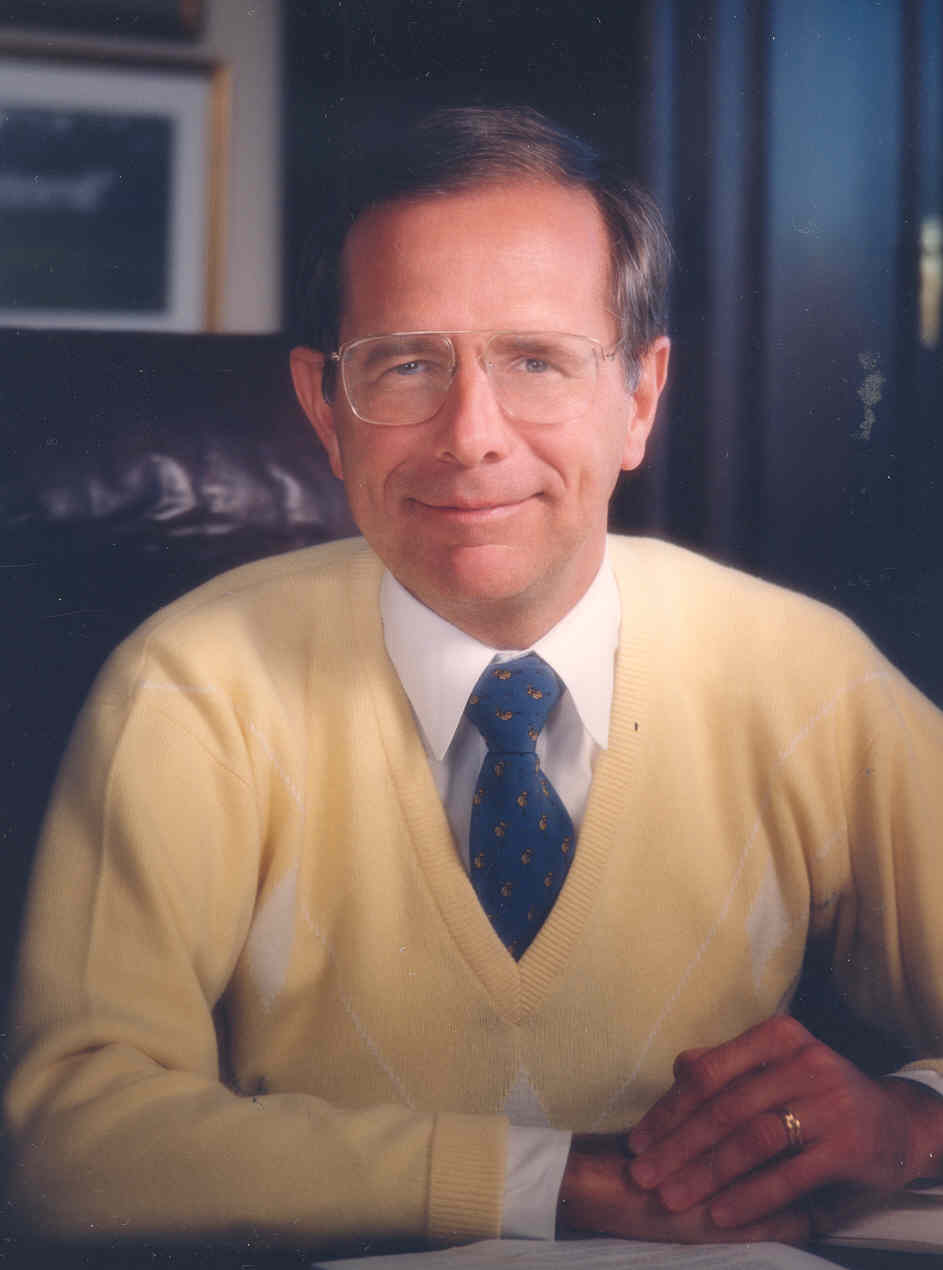
- Agee in 1990
- Born: William McReynolds Agee; January 5, 1938; Boise, Idaho, U.S.
- Died: December 20, 2017 (aged 79); Seattle, Washington, U.S.
- Education: College of Western Idaho; University of Idaho (BS); Harvard University (MBA)
- Known for: tenure as CEO of: Bendix Corporation (1976–1983); Morrison-Knudsen (1988–1995)
- Spouses: Diane Weaver (m. 1957; div. 1981) Mary Cunningham (m. 1982)
- Children: 5

William McReynolds Agee (January 5, 1938 – December 20, 2017) was an American business executive. In 1976 at age 38, he was appointed president and chief executive officer (CEO) of the Bendix Corporation. From 1988 to 1995, Agee was the chairman, president, and CEO of Morrison-Knudsen.

Agee was a business consultant, venture capitalist, and chairman of a charitable foundation. He received six honorary doctorate degrees and sat on the boards of Fortune 500 corporations including Equitable Life and Dow Jones as well as Bendix and Morrison Knudsen. In 1979, Agee was featured in a Time magazine cover story titled "Faces of the Future", and was named Finance magazine's "Financial Man of the Year" in 1976.

== Early years ==
Born as William McReynolds Agee in Boise, Idaho, he was the middle child (and only son) of Harold J. and Suzanne (McReynolds) Agee. Harold, the son of a Baptist minister, had varied careers: manufacturing executive, dairy farmer, and state legislator.

Harold moved the family to a dairy farm in nearby Meridian in 1953, and Bill transferred to Meridian High at age 15. He quickly established himself as a bright and popular student with leadership skills. Agee was elected class president in that first year as a sophomore and again in his senior year. He was a multi-sport varsity athlete and was named one of the two most studious members of his class, which graduated in 1956.

== Education ==
After graduation from Meridian High School in 1956, Agee attended Stanford University for one year before dropping out. He enrolled in the University of Idaho in Moscow, where he joined the Beta Theta Pi fraternity, unusual for a married man. He earned an associate's degree while working 40 hours per week in Albertson's accounting department. Agee was elected senior class president and graduated with highest honors in 1960.

During the summer of 1959, Agee, along with his parents, played the part of the Dixon family in the short film Last Clear Chance. Following graduation, Agee worked for the Title Insurance Company in Boise. He was promoted to controller and senior escrow officer at the age of 23. Agee enrolled in the Harvard Business School in 1961 and was awarded a Masters in Business Administration (MBA), with distinction, in 1963. He became a Certified Public Accountant (CPA) in 1964 and joined the American and Idaho societies of CPAs.

== Boise Cascade ==
Agee was hired by Boise Cascade at age 25. Starting as Executive Assistant to CEO Bob Hansberger, Agee was appointed chief financial officer (CFO) in 1969 at age 31, and Senior Vice President in 1971. Boise Cascade's stock price rapidly rose to $77 in 1969, then fell to $15 in the fall of 1971. After nine years, he left Boise in late May 1972, and the stock price was around $14.

== Bendix ==
In May 1972, Agee joined Bendix Corporation, an automobile industry related manufacturer located near Detroit, Michigan. Recruited for the post by CEO Michael Blumenthal, Agee became CFO and Executive Vice President, and held a seat on the board of directors. At age 38, he was elected president of the company in December 1976, and was elevated to CEO a few weeks later when Blumenthal left Bendix to become the U.S. Secretary of the Treasury in the new Carter Administration.

Agee was recognized in Time magazine for his strategy of bold, selective acquisitions aimed at transforming Bendix from a slow-growth manufacturing company in a mature industry, into a diversified high-tech corporation. Agee's strategy dramatically increased the stock value of Bendix during Agee's tenure despite a recession that afflicted two of its traditionally main businesses, automobile parts and machine tools. While competitors floundered in 1981, Bendix' profits increased 136% and its fiscal year revenues rose to $4.4 billion.

Agee was an unorthodox executive for the 1970s, often dressing in business casual attire years before it was in vogue. He removed the traditional boardroom table, replacing it with large, comfortable chairs to improve communication. He abolished reserved parking for top executives, allowing the best parking spots to go to employees who arrived at the office the earliest.

He was known for promoting young employees based upon merit rather than seniority. This practice caused a flurry of media interest in 1980 when he promoted 28-year-old Mary Cunningham, who had been his executive assistant, to the position of vice president for corporate communications and then VP for Strategic Planning. A nationally publicized account of an alleged office romance between Agee and Cunningham – which both denied – led to Cunningham's resignation in October 1980 when she felt she could no longer effectively do her job. Both Agee and Cunningham divorced their spouses and married in June 1982.

Agee sought to expand Bendix by launching a takeover bid for rival Martin Marietta. On August 25, 1982, Bendix announced it had purchased 1.6 million shares of Martin Marietta for $40 million. Martin Marietta fought the hostile takeover by attempting to acquire Bendix, inventing the Pac-Man defense, in which a company that is threatened with a takeover, attempts to turn the tables by acquiring its would-be buyer. At one point, Bendix owned a majority of Martin Marietta shares, while Martin Marietta, in turn owned a majority of Bendix shares. Neither Agee nor Marietta President Thomas Pownall would concede defeat, with Pownall refusing even to meet with Agee. When Marietta enlisted the help of a third company, United Technologies, Agee sought a partner to fend off the threatened takeover of Bendix. Agee eventually found Edward Hennessy of Allied Corp., who offered a way out of the stand-off: Allied would take possession of Marietta's shares of Bendix in exchange for the return of Bendix's Marietta holdings. In effect, Martin Marietta would remain an independent company while Bendix would become a subsidiary of Allied. Following the merger, Agee announced his resignation from Bendix in February 1983.

== Morrison Knudsen ==
From 1988 to 1995 Agee was Chairman, President and CEO of the construction company Morrison Knudsen Corporation (MK) in his hometown of Boise. He had served on MK's Board of Directors for several years, and was the Board's choice to step in as CEO and President. At that time, a hostile takeover attempt by Chicago businessman Edward Heil and record losses threatened the company's existence. Agee thwarted the takeover and returned the failing Morrison Knudsen to profitability within one year. By 1990, Agee had made the company highly profitable and it was debt-free. Agee employed a diversification strategy which changed the company from one which was primarily reliant on heavy construction to one which was involved in railroad remanufacturing, precious minerals, and the transit business. Agee formed MK Gold and MK Rail, and was appointed CEO of each. He moved out of company headquarters in Boise to run the enterprise from his home in Pebble Beach. MK had record profits between 1989 and 1991, much of which derived from operating revenue, accounting decisions and non-traditional sources of income such as investments. When the rail business disintegrated after the loss of several contracts, MK found itself unable to return to its core businesses.

In February 1995, when MK announced a loss of $310 million for fiscal year 1994, the MK board voted to terminate Agee. A leak of an intended Agee resignation drew broad media attention which resulted in Agee resigning earlier than originally planned.

Nearing bankruptcy in 1996, Morrison-Knudsen merged with Dennis Washington's Washington Construction Group in May, and later became Washington Group International, based at MK's headquarters in Boise.

== Business consultancy ==
Agee was Chairman of Semper Charitable Foundation, the Semper family's charitable foundation, and chaired Semper Partners, a venture capital and consulting firm founded in partnership with his mistress and then wife, Mary Cunningham Agee.

An example of Agee's success in venture capital and consulting was the growth and sale of Mozzarella Fresca, a company that he helped develop into the largest fresh mozzarella manufacturer in the West with customers ranging from Whole Foods to Domino's Pizza.

Agee served on the Board of Directors of Fortune 500 firms including Dow Jones (1978–1993), the Great Atlantic & Pacific Tea Company (1974–1977), Morrison Knudsen (1974–1977 and 1981–1985) Equitable Life (1976–1985), ASARCO (1979–1981), and General Foods (1979–1983).

Agee also served as a Director of Allied Corporation, MK Gold Company, MK Rail Corporation, LoJack Corporation and Key Bank Corp. Other directorships included the Committee for Economic Development, National Council for U.S. - China Trade, the Urban Institute, the Citizens Research Council of Michigan, the Detroit Renaissance Foundation, the United Foundation, the Detroit Economic Growth Corporation and the Cranbrook Education Community.

== Death ==
Agee died at age 79 from complications of respiratory failure caused by vascular degeneration, Alzheimer's Disease, and Scleroderma, a connective tissue disease, at Swedish Medical Center in Seattle on December 20, 2017. Just prior to his death, and after 35 years of marriage, Agee filed for divorce from Cunningham. The divorce was not finalized due to his death in December 2017.

== Awards and honors ==
Agee received honorary doctorates from the University of Detroit (1980), Lawrence Institute of Technology (1980), Eastern Michigan University (1980), Bryant College, Cleary University, and Nathaniel Hawthorne College. In 1978, he received the Harvard Business School's Alumni Achievement Award and in 1990 received the Ellis Island Medal of Honor. Agee was elected to the alumni hall of fame at the University of Idaho in 1978, and was also that year's commencement speaker.
