= Upshot-Knothole Encore =

Nuclear weapons test conducted by the United States

Upshot–Knothole Encore
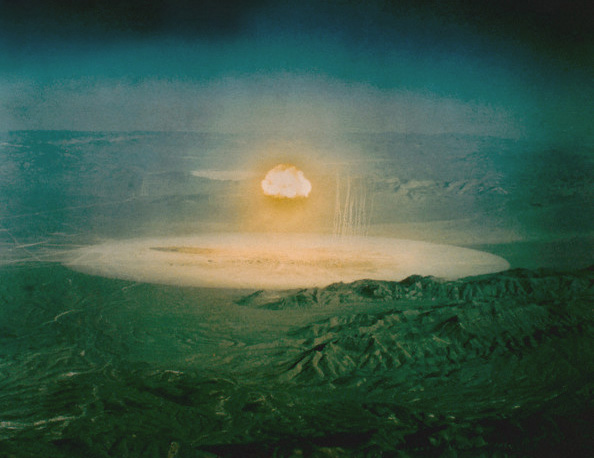
- The explosion, viewed from the air

Information
- Country: United States
- Test series: Operation Upshot–Knothole
- Test site: Nevada Test Site, Area 5
- Date: May 8, 1953
- Test type: Atmospheric
- Yield: 27 kt

Test chronology

Upshot–Knothole Encore was a nuclear weapons test conducted by the United States as part of Operation Upshot–Knothole. It took place on May 8, 1953 in Yucca Flat, in the Nevada Test Site.

== Test location ==
The test device, codenamed Encore, was detonated at 8:30 local time by performing an airdrop of a Mk-6D bomb from 19,000 feet (5,800 m) with a B-50 Superfortress over Area 5 at the Nevada Test Site. At 2,423 feet (739 m), the bomb detonated, although it was 15 feet (4.6 m) west and 937 feet (286 m) south of its designated target. The estimated yield of the weapon was 30-36 kilotons, although it yielded 27 kilotons. In the codename "Encore", the letter "E" was a reference to the "effects" of weapons testing.

== Effects testing ==
As Encore was an effects test, multiple objects were subjected to the blast, including trees. Since the Nevada Test Site sits in a desert and does not contain trees, the United States Forest Service transported 145 Ponderosa pines from a nearby canyon to Area 5. The trees were then placed in holes at Frenchman Flat, and cemented into the ground, 6,500 feet from ground zero. The initial release of thermal radiation ignited many of the trees, and the subsequent blast wave blew them over. Model houses built for the test were recorded to produce the Civil Defense film The House in the Middle.

Soldiers were brought in to view the blast as part of the Desert Rock exercises. 3,500 soldiers from all over the country participated in the exercises, and were formed into Combat Battalion teams. In addition to this, six hundred high-ranking personnel and congressmen were on hand to view the exercises, which were aimed to "indoctrinate troops in atomic weapons in order that they will know how to protect themselves and their equipment in event of an enemy atomic attack in combat situations".
