= Master Hands =

1936 film

Master Hands, full movie from 1936

Master Hands is a 1936 sponsored documentary film short which shows what work is like in a Chevrolet automobile factory. It was produced by the Jam Handy Organization, a pioneer in industrial film production.

== Credits ==
Notables for this film include original music by Samuel Benavie, cinematography by Gordon Avil, and film editing by Vincent Herman.

== Legacy ==
In 1999, Master Hands was selected for preservation in the United States National Film Registry by the Library of Congress as being "culturally, historically, or aesthetically significant".

== See also ==
- Jam Handy
- Prelinger Archives
