= A Coach for Cinderella =

- Directed by: Max Fleischer
- Produced by: Jamison Handy
- Music by: Sammy Timberg
- Production company: Fleischer Studios
- Distributed by: Jam Handy Organization
- Release date: September 24, 1936
- Running time: 9 minutes
- Country: United States
- Language: English

A Coach for Cinderella is a 1936 Technicolor animated cartoon sponsored film based on the Cinderella fairy tale. Directed by Max Fleischer for Jaminson Handy, the film is an advertisement for Chevrolet automobiles.

== Summary ==
The story begins with Cinderella wishing to have a better life, away from her evil stepsisters. There is a gnome that is watching Cinderella live a strenuous life. When Cinderella falls asleep the gnome takes Cinderella's measurements, then leaves to meet other gnomes in the woods. He tells them that Cinderella has done quite a bit for them when they were in need, so they should return the favor. The gnomes decide to help Cinderella by making her a dress for the ball, and a car that she can travel in. They use various things around the forest to make her a carriage. Then, they put it through the "modernizer" and at the end of the clip it is revealed to be a new Chevrolet. Cinderella then goes out to the ball in the car, with the rest of the story told by the sequel A Ride for Cinderella.

== Availability ==
This film is in the public domain.

== See also ==
- Chevrolet
- Jam Handy
- Fairy tales
- Advertising
- Sponsored film
- A Ride for Cinderella
- Peg-Leg Pedro
- The Princess and the Pauper
