= The House in the Middle =

1954 American film

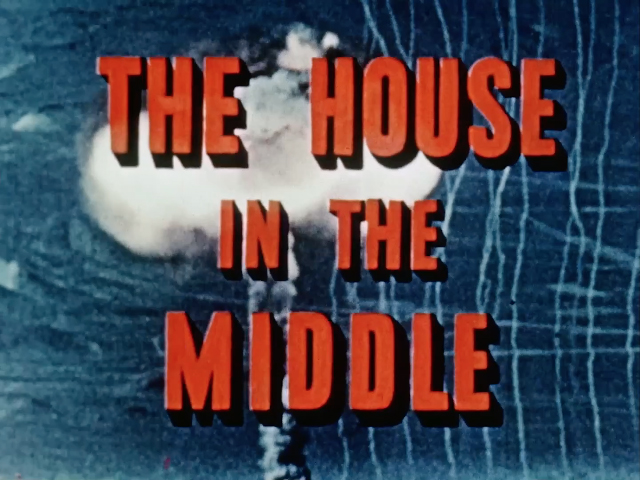
Intertitle of the 1954 version of The House in the Middle, selected for preservation in the National Film Registry

The House in the Middle is the title of two American documentary film shorts (13 minutes), respectively from 1953 and 1954, which showed the effects of a nuclear bomb test on a set of three small houses.

== 1953 version ==
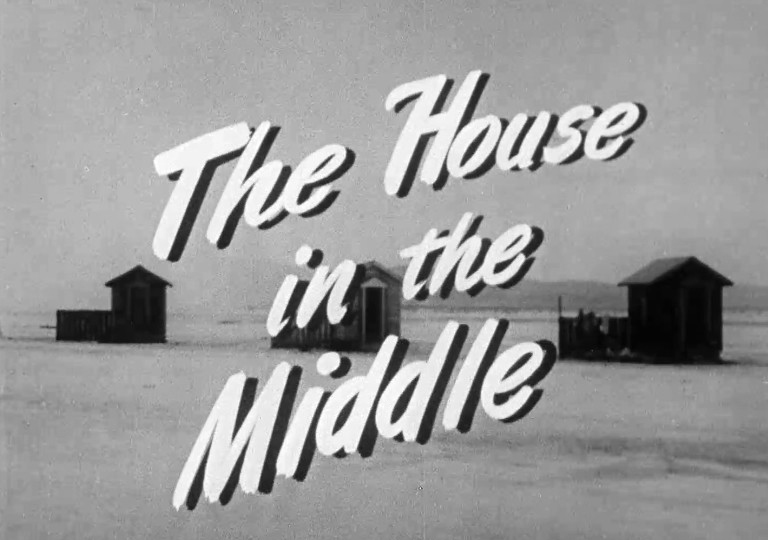
Intertitle of the original 1953 version

The black-and-white 1953 film was created by the Federal Civil Defense Administration to attempt to show that a clean, freshly painted house (the middle house) is more likely to survive a nuclear attack than its poorly maintained counterparts (the right and left houses).

== 1954 version ==
The House in the Middle (1954)

A color version was released the next year by the National Clean Up – Paint Up – Fix Up Bureau, a "bureau" invented by the National Paint, Varnish and Lacquer Association trade group (now known as the American Coatings Association).

== Production ==
Footage for the film was recorded during the Upshot-Knothole Encore test at the Nevada Test Site on May 8, 1953.

== Legacy ==
In 2001, the Library of Congress deemed the 1954 film "culturally, historically, or aesthetically significant" and selected it for preservation in the National Film Registry.

It was featured on Rick Prelinger's 2004 collage film Panorama Ephemera.

== See also ==
- Fallout Protection
- The Bomb
- Duck and Cover
- The Atomic Cafe
