= One Bad Knight =

1938 animated advertisement by the Jam Handy Organization

One Bad Knight is a 1938 theatrical advertisement for Chevrolet, produced by the Jam Handy Organization, featuring the gnome, Nicky Nome.

== Plot ==
To the tune of "The Love Bug Will Bite You," a "love bug" sprays a pair of frogs, a pair of birds and Nicky's "horse hopper," Hortense, with a love potion.

A young boy, pulling a toy horse, sees a wanted poster for the Black Knight, then meets a princess. While he and the princess are picking flowers, the unnamed hero boy encounters Nicky, while the Black Knight kidnaps the princess.

King Louis, a trencherman, leaves his dinner table to rescue the princess, only to be repulsed by the Black Knight's castle.

Overnight, Louis is lamenting how to breach such a strong castle, mentioning many horsepower, a mobile fortress and great speed. Nicky then whispers to Louis, and through the remainder of the night, a Trojan horse is built.

At dawn, Louis looks out of the right eye of the Trojan horse and says, "Give up, Blackie?" only to be answered with a salvo of arrows that surrounded the eye where Louis issued his challenge. Louis replied, "Let 'em have it!"

A hatch opens in the front of the Trojan horse, and out drives the hero boy at the wheel of a 1938 Chevrolet. The wheels bounce over logs and rocks to tout their "Knee-Action" suspension, arrows go in and out of the vent windows to tout their "Draft-Free Ventilation," rocks bounce off the roof to tout their "Turret-Top" roof, and then the car bulldozed the castle walls with the sound effect of a steam locomotive blowing its whistle for a railroad crossing.

The hero boy returns in the undamaged car to the last turret standing in the castle, rushing up a spiral staircase to free the princess and to battle the Black Knight, although with a wooden toy sword. The hero boy winds up on his back, and the Black Knight picks up a battleaxe and swings it at the boy, who rolls out of the way. When the knight hits the floorboard, it acts like a catapult, hurling the knight down the spiral staircase to his doom. The Princess and the hero boy kiss.

Back at the king's castle, Louis knights the hero boy for bravery on the field of combat, and offers the hero boy one wish, pushing his daughter toward the boy. The boy looked at the Chevrolet and said, "One wish, Sire?" The boy looked again at the car and back at the king, and said, "Double or nothing, Your Majesty!" Louis gave the boy a waving, left-handed salute.

Flanked by knights on horseback singing "The Love Bug Will Bite You," the young couple drive away in the Chevrolet. Nicky and Hortense appear from behind the grille and shake hands. The End.
