= The Home Electrical =

1915 film by General Electric

The Home Electrical was a 1915 one-reeler promotional silent short film produced by the American company General Electric that showcased the latest electrical appliances at the time, such as washing machine, vacuum cleaner, electric car and toaster. The main character is a young man named Mr. Newhouse, who tests new household products in a house filled with technological innovations. The film is 11 minutes long. The film won two gold medals at the Panama–Pacific International Exposition, a San Francisco world's fair that lasted between February 20 and December 4, 1915.
