= Rick Prelinger =

American film director

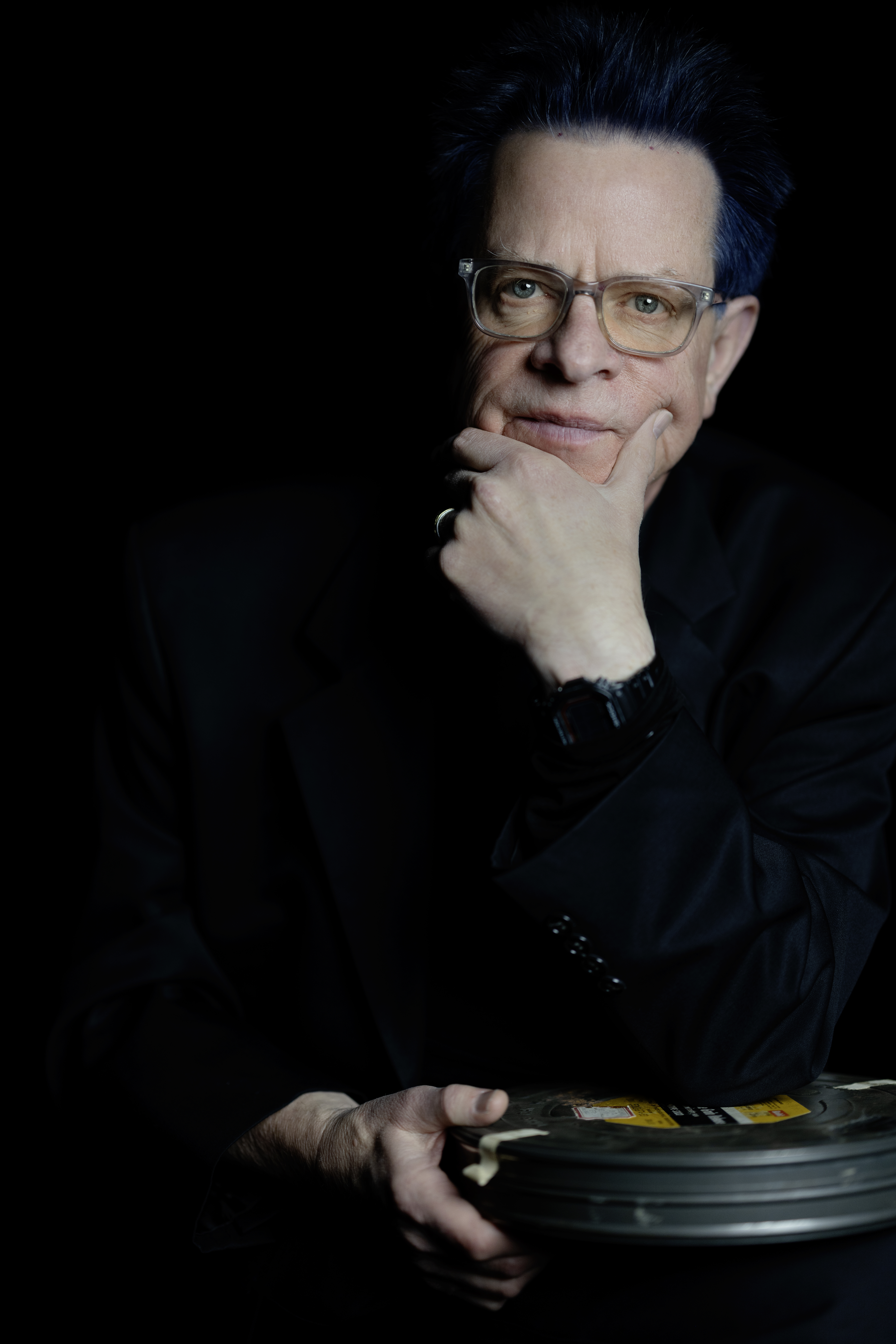
- Prelinger at the Long Now in 2025
- Education: University of California, Berkeley
- Occupations: Archivist, writer, filmmaker
- Known for: Prelinger Archives, Prelinger Library
- Website: www.prelinger.com

Rick Prelinger is an American archivist, writer, and filmmaker. He is also professor emeritus at the University of California, Santa Cruz. Prelinger is best known as the founder of the Prelinger Archives, a collection of 60,000 advertising, educational, industrial, and amateur films acquired by the Library of Congress in 2002 after 20 years' operation.

Rick has partnered with the Internet Archive to make over 6,000 films from Prelinger Archives available online for free viewing, downloading and reuse. With the Voyager Company, a pioneer new media publisher, he produced fourteen LaserDiscs and CD-ROMs with material from his archives, including Ephemeral Films, the Our Secret Century series and Call It Home: The House That Private Enterprise Built, a laserdisc on the history of suburbia and suburban planning (co-produced with architect Keller Easterling). For Prelinger, "archives are a primary weapon against amnesia."

== Life ==
Prelinger worked at The Comedy Channel from its startup in 1989 until it merged with the comedy network HA! to become Comedy Central. He then worked at Home Box Office until 1995. Prelinger has taught in the MFA design program at New York's School of Visual Arts and lectures widely on American cultural and social history and on issues of cultural and intellectual property access. He sat (2001–2004) on the National Film Preservation Board as representative of the Association of Moving Image Archivists, was board president of the San Francisco Cinematheque (2002–2007), and is a board member of the Internet Archive and a professor in the Department of Film & Digital Media at UC Santa Cruz. With spouse Megan Prelinger he is co-founder of the Prelinger Library, a reference library located in San Francisco, California.

== Works: films and writings ==
His feature-length film Panorama Ephemera, consisting of 64 self-contained segments from various ephemeral films, opened in Summer 2004. He has also produced such archival home movie compilation films Lost Landscapes of San Francisco (15 annual films, 2006–2020), Lost Landscapes of Detroit (three films, 2010–2012 and a fourth and fifth, Yesterday and Tomorrow in Detroit, 2014 and 2015) and All-Is-Well (2016). He received the Creative Capital Award in 2012 to make the home movie compilation film No More Road Trips?, which premiered in Austin, Texas, at South by Southwest in March 2013. A summary of his 2019 film Useful Prophecies states that:

"While the distance between cinema and truth is often impossible to bridge, some films reveal more than we might think any films could. Such is the case with the long-neglected body of useful cinema —films produced because they had jobs to do, like sponsored, educational, and industrial films— and home movies, sometimes revelatory works that seem to spring from the unconscious. Built from the collections of Prelinger Archives, one of the world’s largest collections of nonfiction films and home movies, this program builds a prophetic portrait of futures to come as proposed by filmmakers who let these visions speak through them."

He wrote The Field Guide to Sponsored Films (2007) which "describes 452 historically or culturally significant motion pictures commissioned by businesses, charities, advocacy groups, and state or local government units between 1897 and 1980." It is available as a printed book and also available for free download from the National Film Preservation Foundation.

== See also ==
- Sponsored film
- List of films in the public domain
- Americana (culture)
