= Prelinger Archives =

Film collection

The Prelinger Archives is a collection of films relating to U.S. cultural history, the evolution of the American landscape, everyday life, and social history. Originally based in New York City from 1982 through 2002, it has been based in San Francisco since.

== History ==
The Archives were founded by Rick Prelinger in 1982 to preserve what he calls "ephemeral" films: films sponsored by corporations and organizations, educational films, and amateur and home movies. Typically, ephemeral films were produced to fulfill specific purposes at specific times, and many exist today only by chance or accident. About 65% of the Archive's holdings are in the public domain because their copyrights have expired, or because they were U.S. productions that were published without proper copyright notice.

== Criteria ==
The stated goal of the Prelinger Archives is to "collect, preserve, and facilitate access to films of historic significance that haven't been collected elsewhere".

By 2001, it had acquired 60,000 completed films of varying lengths and over 30,000 cans of unedited film. In 2002, the Library of Congress acquired the physical films held in the Archives as of that date. The Archives made two subsequent donations to Library of Congress totalling some 65,000 cans of film, primarily industrial and educational titles. As of spring 2015, the Archives holds about 8,000 films in videotape and digital form, approximately 14,000 home movies, and 1,000 industrial and sponsored films acquired since 2002.

Compared to many other moving-image archives, Prelinger Archives provides a relatively high level of public access to its collections. Over 8,500 public domain films are available for download and unrestricted reuse on the Internet at the Internet Archive. All the films in the archives can be licensed for production use through Getty Images.

Prelinger Archives currently focuses principally on collecting home movies and amateur film, and has approximately 30,000 items as of Fall 2023.

== Gallery ==
Perversion for Profit part 1

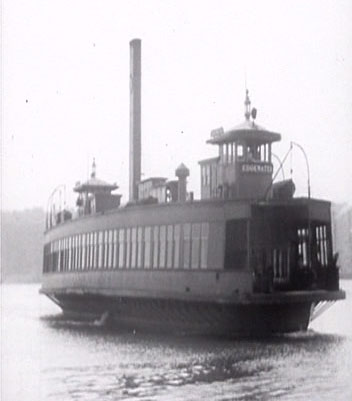
The 125th Street Ferry in New York City from 1941.

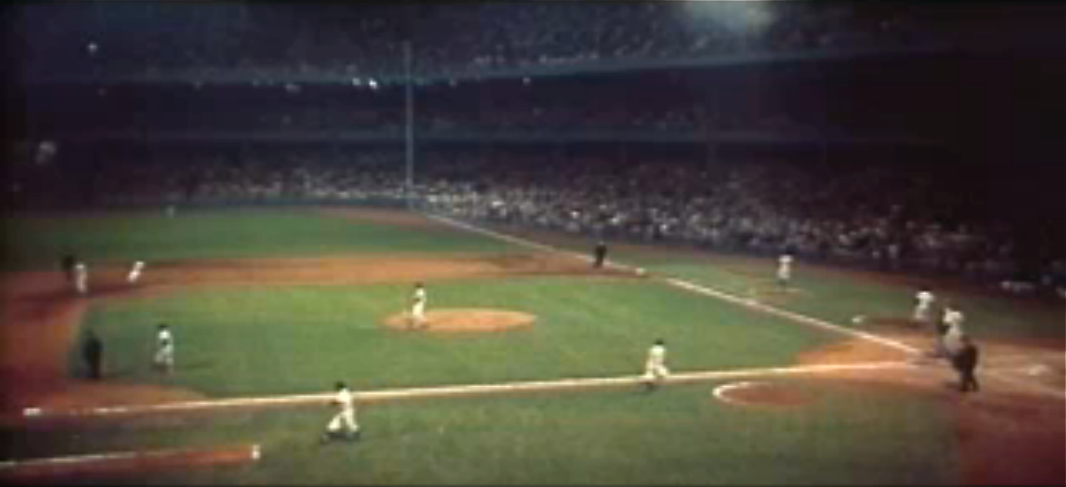
Yankee Stadium, 1956 screen capture
