= Sponsored film =

Film genre

Sponsored film, or ephemeral film, as defined by film archivist Rick Prelinger, is a film made by a particular sponsor for a specific purpose other than as a work of art: the films were designed to serve a specific pragmatic purpose for a limited time. Prelinger estimates that 300,000 industrial and institutional films were made in the U.S. – far more than theatrical films. Many of the films are orphan works since they lack copyright owners or active custodians to guarantee their long-term preservation.

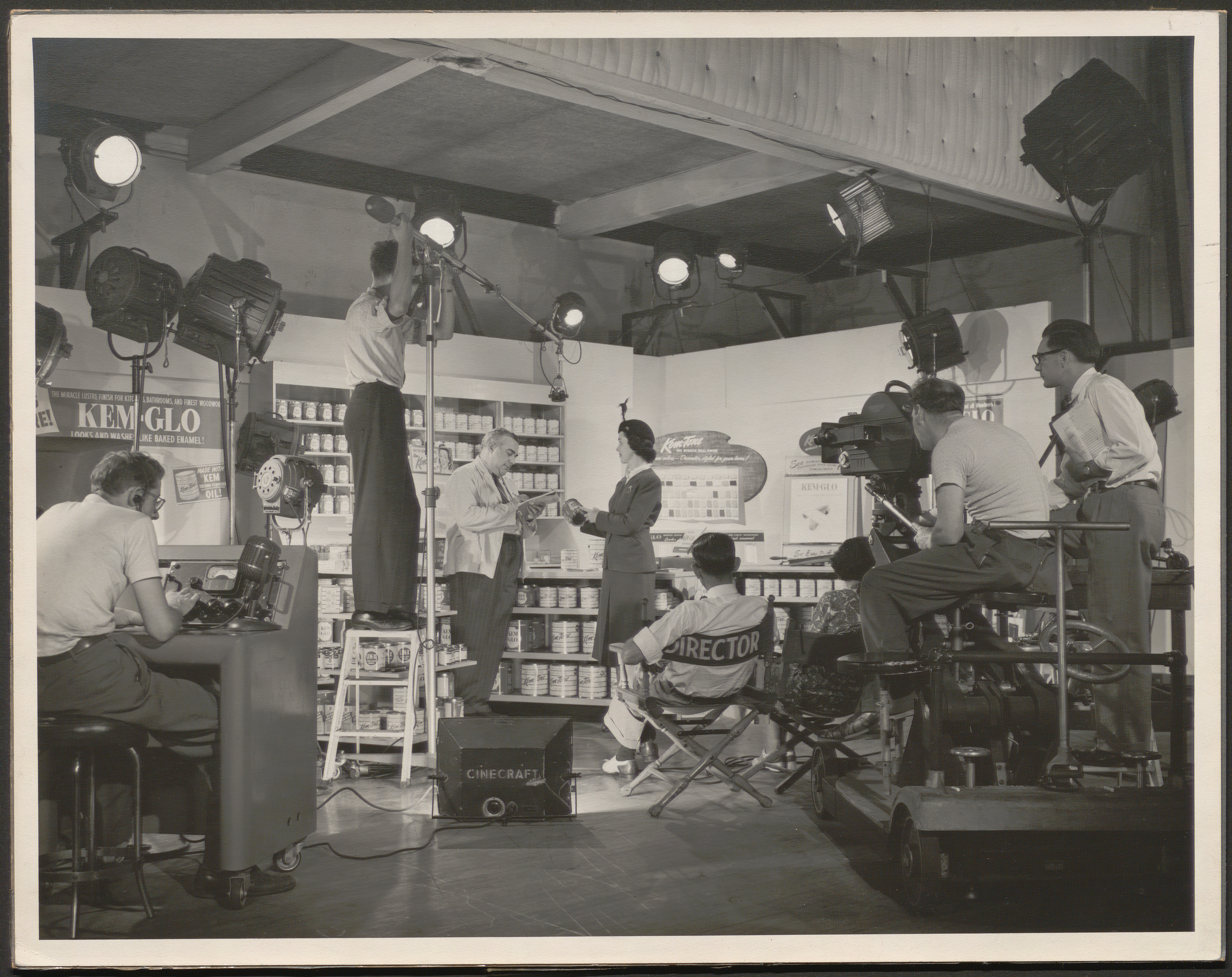
A behind-the-camera look at the cast and crew filming the 1949 Sherwin-Williams Company sponsored film “Sell the Facts.”

== Types of sponsored film ==
Films that fall under the sponsorship genre include industrial video or business films, industrial musicals, training films, advertising films, educational films, religious films, travelogues, medical and scientific films, government films, and advocacy films by social service organizations and/or trade organizations.

While some may borrow themes from well-known film genres such as western film, musicals, and comedies, what defines them is a sponsored rhetoric to achieve the sponsor's goals, rather than those of the creative artist.

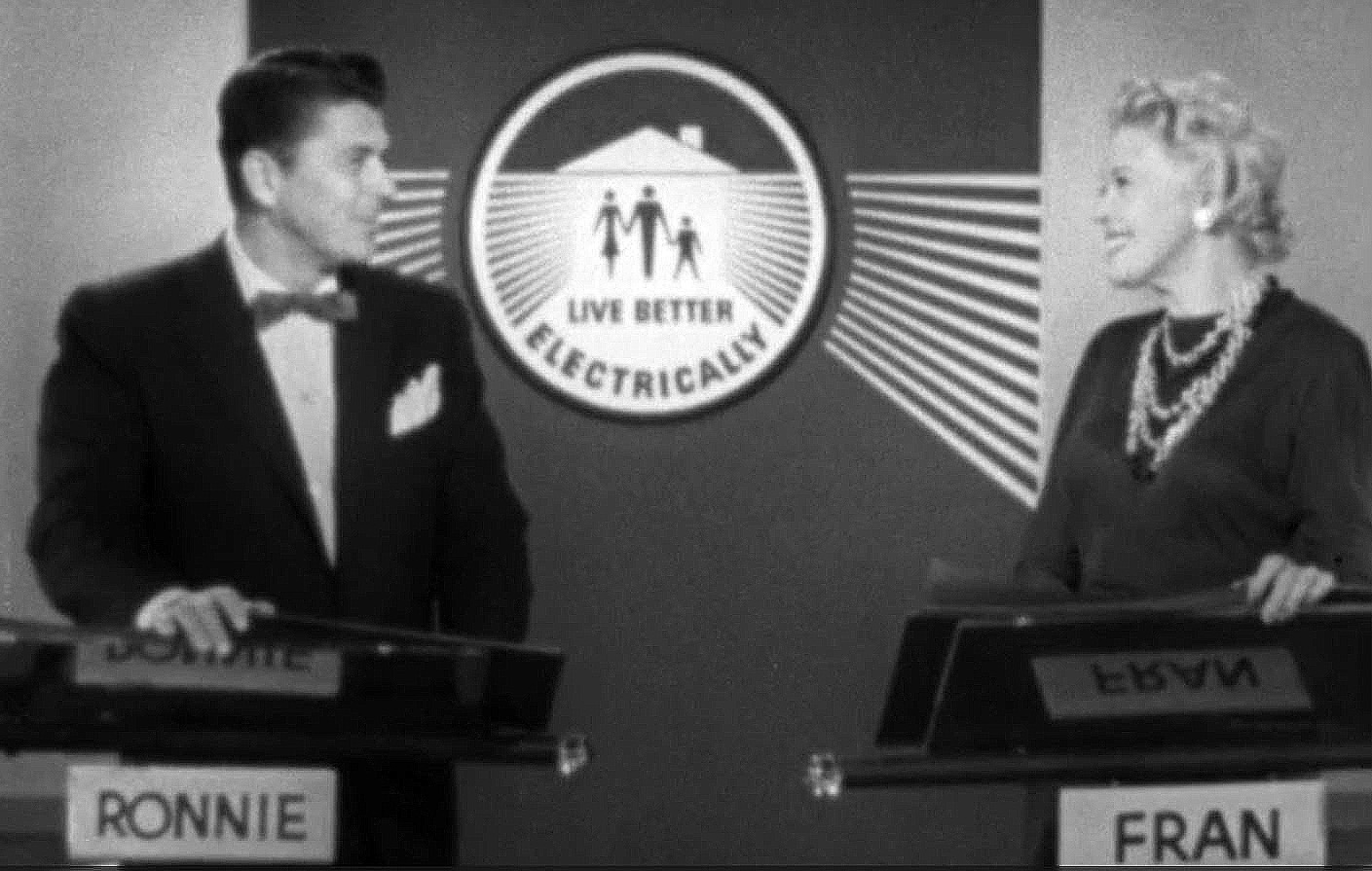
Ronald Reagan and Fran Allison starred in “How will you rate in ’58?,” a General Electric dealer training film.

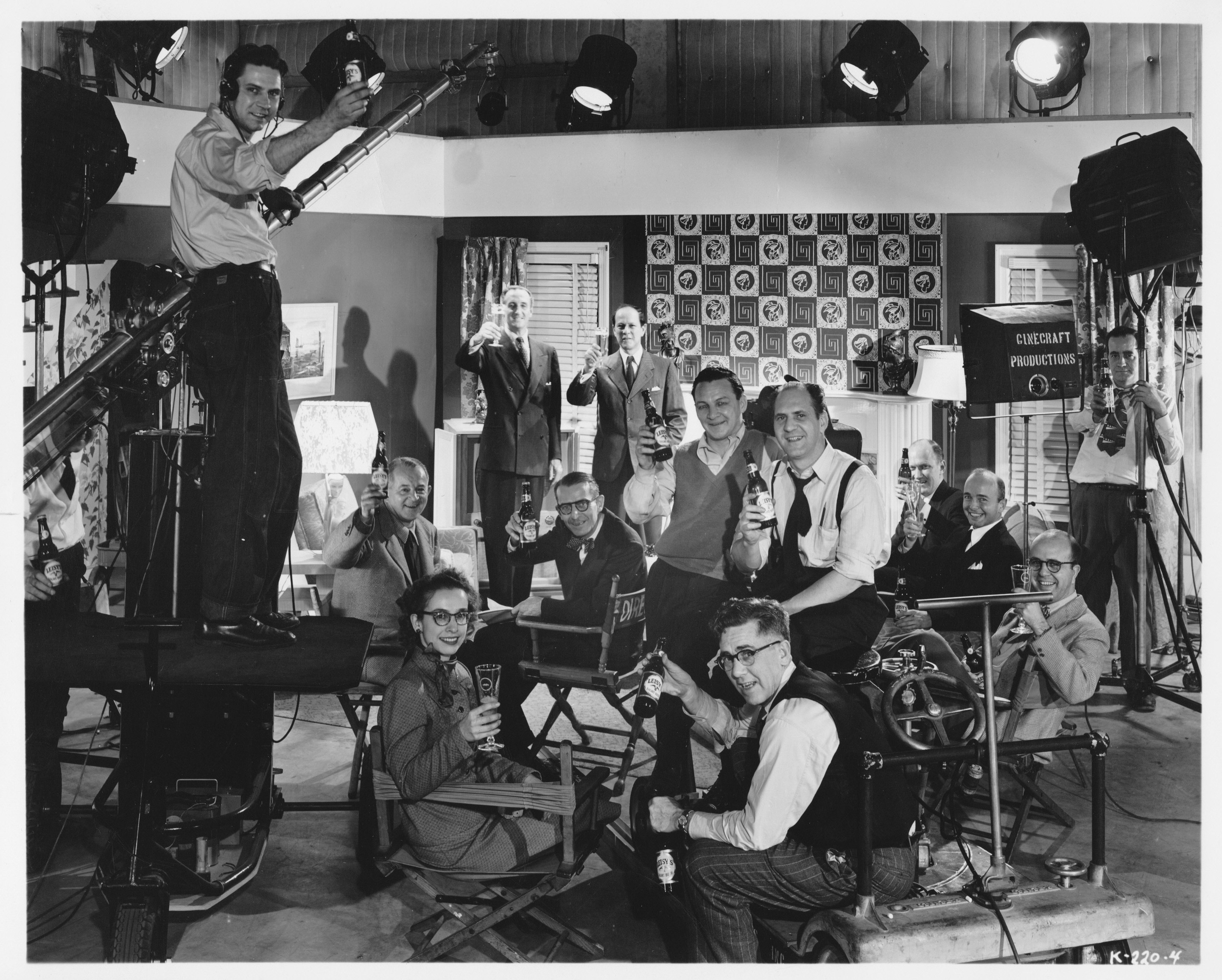
Prominent actors and other notables, including Basil Rathbone who did many portrayals of Sherlock Holmes, appeared in sponsored films

Theatrical actors and other notables frequently appeared in sponsored films.

Sponsored films were usually loaned at no cost, except sometimes postage, to clubs, schools, and other groups. America's largest companies - AT&T, DuPont, Ford, General Electric, General Motors, Republic Steel, Standard Oil, and Westinghouse Electric Company - were for decades active sponsored film producers and distributors; others included airlines who offered travelogues on their destinations.

== History ==
Sponsored films have been produced since the early years of the motion picture industry.

The Stenographer's Friend (1910) or, What Was Accomplished by an Edison Business Phonograph, a silent film about how productivity and office politics improve with the introduction of the Edison company’s wax-cylinder dictating machine, is one of the earliest examples of a U.S. company specifically making a film to sell a product. Another early sponsored film is Back to the Old Farm, a one-reel feature produced by the Essanay Film Company in Chicago in August 1911 for International Harvester. The farm equipment company had shown films of plants and equipment at state fairs and other gatherings before this film, but Back to the Old Farm is thought to be their first sponsored film. General Electric produced one of the earliest in-house sponsored films, The Home Electrical (1915). In the 11-minute silent film, a man shows off his electrical household appliances, including a sewing machine, vacuum cleaner, electrically heated pan, toaster, stove, washing machine, and cigar lighter. Another early example of a sponsored film is the Rothacker Film Manufacturing Company's The Heart of Cleveland (1924) for the Cleveland Electric Illuminating Company.

Before the invention of 16 mm film, sponsored films were shot on 35 mm nitrate-based film. The cameras for shooting and the projectors showing 35 mm film were expensive, and the nitrate-based film was highly flammable, releasing hazardous gases as it deteriorated.

In 1923, Eastman Kodak introduced the first 16 mm film outfit, consisting of a camera, projector, tripod, screen, and splicer. The system was advertised as a cheap, safe, and easier-to-store alternative to 35 mm film. 16 mm film was the first successful format to use acetate safety film exclusively as a film base. Another plus, 16 mm film was particularly well-suited for non-theatrical distribution, meaning films could be shown outside of traditional movie theaters. Sponsored film producers quickly adopted the new film format.

The post-World War II period through the 1950s is considered the golden age of sponsored films. In that period, the sponsored film industry employed thousands and supported two long-running trade journals, Educational Screen (1922-1971) and Business Screen (1938-1982).

In the early years of commercial television, local television stations often used sponsored films as "filler" programming.

In the 1950s, almost every American city of any size had at least one sponsored film studio. Cleveland, Ohio, for example, was home to over a dozen sponsored film studios.

Theatrical film studios, including Walt Disney Pictures, produced sponsored films along with hundreds of studios that specialized in the genre.

== Awards ==
The 1948 Cleveland Film Festival was the first American film festival dedicated to recognizing the importance of sponsored films. By 1956, dozens of cities and organizations were running sponsored film festivals, and the organizers of the Cleveland Film Festival stopped running the festival. Sponsored film festivals continued on but never regained their popularity or influence.

A number of sponsored films have been nominated for Academy Awards, and several have won Oscars, mainly in the Documentary Feature and Documentary Short categories.

== Sponsored Films That Have Won an Academy Award ==
Film Title / Year Released/ Sponsor
A Time for Burning (1966). Sponsor: Lutheran Film Associates. Oscar for Best Documentary Feature (1967)
Benjy (film) (1951). Sponsor: Los Angeles Orthopaedic Hospital. Oscar for Best Documentary Short Subject (1952)
Giuseppina (1959). Sponsor: British Petroleum Company. Oscar for Best Documentary Short Subject (1959)
Churchill's Island (1941). Sponsor: National Film Board of Canada. Oscar for Best Documentary Short Subject (1942)
December 7th (1943). Sponsor: U.S. Navy. Oscar for Best Documentary Short Subject (1944)
Skyscraper (1959). Sponsor: Tishman Realty & Construction Co.; Reynolds Metals Co.; Bethlehem Steel Co.; Westinghouse Elevator Co.; York Air Conditioning. Oscar for Best Live Action Short Subject (1959)
The House I Live In (1945 film). Sponsor: Anti-Defamation League of B'nai B'rith. Honorary Academy Award for director Mervyn LeRoy (1946)
The Redwoods (1967). Sponsor: Sierra Club. Oscar for Best Documentary Short Subject (1967)
To Be Alive! (1964). Sponsor: S. C. Johnson & Son. Oscar for Best Documentary Short Subject (1965)
Why Man Creates (1968). Sponsor: Kaiser Aluminum and Chemical Corp. Oscar for Best Documentary Short Subject (1968)
Wild Wings (1965). Sponsor: British Transport Films. Oscar for Best Documentary Short Subject (1966)

At least a dozen sponsored films have been selected for the Library of Congress National Film Registry because they are "culturally, historically, or aesthetically significant."

== Sponsored Films Selected for the National Film Registry ==
Film Title / Year Released/ Sponsor/ Year Inducted
A Time for Burning (1966). Sponsor: Lutheran Film Associates. Inducted into the National Film Registry in 2005
Duck and Cover (1952). Sponsor: Federal Civil Defense Administration. Inducted into the National Film Registry in 2004
All My Babies: A Midwife's Own Story (1952). Sponsor: Georgia Dept. of Public Health. Inducted into the National Film Registry in 2002
Louisiana Story (1948). Sponsor: Standard Oil Co. of New Jersey. Inducted into the National Film Registry in 1994
Master Hands (1936). Sponsor: Chevrolet Motor Co. Inducted into the National Film Registry in 1999
Powers of Ten (1977). Sponsor: IBM Corp. Inducted into the National Film Registry in 1998
The City (1939). Sponsor: American Institute of Planners, through Civic Films Inc., with funding from Carnegie Corp. of New York. Inducted into the National Film Registry in 1998
The Forgotten Frontier (1931). Sponsor: Frontier Nursing Service Inc. Inducted into the National Film Registry in 1996
The House in the Middle (1954). Sponsors: National Paint, Varnish, and Lacquer Association; National Clean Up–Paint Up–Fix Up Bureau; Federal Civil Defense Administration. Inducted into the National Film Registry in 2001
The Making of an American (1920). Sponsor: Dept. of Americanization, State of Connecticut. Inducted into the National Film Registry in 2005
The River (1938 film). Sponsor: U.S. Government (Farm Security Administration/Resettlement Administration. Inducted into the National Film Registry in 1990.
To Fly! (1976). Sponsor: Conoco Inc. Inducted into the National Film Registry in 1995
Westinghouse Works, 1904. Sponsor: Westinghouse Electric & Manufacturing Co. Inducted into the National Film Registry in 1998
Why Man Creates (1968). Sponsor: Kaiser Aluminum and Chemical Corp. Inducted into the National Film Registry in 2002

Significant collections of sponsored films exist in the Anthology Film Archives, A/V Geeks, George Eastman Museum, Hagley Museum and Library, The Museum of Modern Art, National Archives and Records Administration, Northeast Historic Film, the Orgone Archive, the Prelinger Archives, the Smithsonian's National Museum of American History, UCLA Film & Television Archive, and the USC School of Cinematic Arts Hugh M. Hefner Moving Image Archive.

== See also ==
- Prelinger Archives
- Internet Archive § Moving image collection
- Industrial musical
- Industrial video
