= Deaths in March 2008 =

The following is a list of notable deaths in March 2008.

Entries for each day are listed alphabetically by surname. A typical entry lists information in the following sequence:

- Name, age, country of citizenship at birth, subsequent country of citizenship (if applicable), reason for notability, cause of death (if known), and reference.

== March 2008 ==
=== 1 ===
- Haroldo de Andrade, 73, Brazilian radio presenter (Rádio Globo), multiple organ dysfunction syndrome.
- Dora Dolz, 66, Spanish-born Dutch artist.
- Kevin Dunn, 57, British Bishop of Hexham and Newcastle.
- Bhanbhagta Gurung, 86, Nepalese Gurkha soldier, recipient of the Victoria Cross.
- Raúl Reyes, 59, Colombian FARC second-in-command, airstrike.
- Moustafa Soheim, 70, Egyptian Olympic fencer.
- Sid Spindler, 75, Polish-born Australian senator (Democrats) (1990–1996), liver cancer.
- Andrey Tissin, 32, Russian world and European canoeing champion, Olympian and coach, drowning.
- George Toley, 91, American collegiate tennis coach.

=== 2 ===
- Sofiko Chiaureli, 70, Georgian actress.
- Barbara Anne Davis, 77, American baseball player (AAGPBL)
- Roger Gill, 35, Guyanese Olympic sprinter, car accident.
- Jeff Healey, 41, Canadian singer ("Angel Eyes") and actor (Road House), sarcoma.
- Carl Hoddle, 40, English footballer (Leyton Orient, Barnet), brain aneurysm.
- Paul Raymond, 82, British pornographic magazine publisher and property magnate.
- Ted Robinson, 84, American golf course architect, pancreatic cancer.
- Frederick Seitz, 96, American physicist who co-discovered the Wigner-Seitz cell.

=== 3 ===
- Bertil Albertsson, 86, Swedish runner.
- Vizol Angami, 93, Indian Naga politician.
- Ramón Barquín, 93, Cuban army colonel and diplomat, opponent of Fulgencio Batista, led 1956 coup attempt, cancer.
- William Brice, 86, American painter and UCLA professor, injuries from fall.
- Giuseppe Di Stefano, 86, Italian operatic tenor, after long coma following assault.
- Donald S. Lopez Sr., 84, American deputy director of the National Air and Space Museum, heart attack.
- Malcolm McKenna, 77, American paleontologist.
- Norm O'Neill, 71, Australian cricketer, throat cancer.
- Annemarie Renger, 88, German politician (SPD), Speaker of Parliament (1972–1976).
- Iván Ríos, 45, Colombian FARC commander, shot by his Chief of Security.
- Norman Smith, 85, British singer, recording engineer (The Beatles, Pink Floyd) and record producer.
- Kenneth Woollcombe, 84, British Bishop of Oxford (1971–1978).

=== 4 ===
- Hossein Alikhani, 63, Iranian NGO founder, political scientist and author, leukemia.
- Richard Davis Anderson, 86, American mathematician.
- Erwin Ballabio, 89, Swiss football goalkeeper.
- Robert Bruning, 79, Australian actor, heart attack.
- Gary Gygax, 69, American game designer, co-creator of Dungeons & Dragons.
- Tina Lagostena Bassi, 82, Italian politician.
- Elena Nathanael, 61, Greek actress, lung cancer.
- Leonard Rosenman, 83, American film composer (Barry Lyndon, Star Trek IV: The Voyage Home, Bound for Glory), Oscar winner (1977, 1978), heart attack.
- Semka Sokolović-Bertok, 72, Croatian actress, stroke.
- George Walter, 79, Antiguan Premier (1971–1976), heart attack.

=== 5 ===
- Eve Carson, 22, American student leader (UNC Chapel Hill), shot.
- Derek Dooley, 78, British footballer and former chairman of Sheffield United.
- Elfriede Kaun, 93, German 1936 Olympic bronze medalist in the high jump.
- Nader Khalili, 72, Iranian architect, heart failure.
- John C. Mackie, 87, American Representative from Michigan (1965–1967).
- Richard Miles McCool, 86, American Medal of Honor recipient for actions during World War II.
- Don McFarlane, 81, Canadian Olympic sprinter.
- Stephen Oliver, 66, American actor (Peyton Place), gastric cancer.
- Sixty Rayburn, 91, American politician.
- Hajibey Sultanov, 86, Azerbaijani astronomer, fire accident.
- Joseph Weizenbaum, 85, German-born American computer scientist, inventor of ELIZA computer program, stroke.
- Ihor Yemchuk, 77, Ukrainian Olympic silver (1952) and bronze (1956) medal-winning rower.

=== 6 ===
- Gloria Shayne Baker, 84, American songwriter (Rain Rain Go Away, Do You Hear What I Hear?), lung cancer.
- Lili Boniche, 87, Algerian-born French singer of Andalusian Arabic songs.
- Don Curtis, 80, American professional wrestler, stroke.
- Kurt Eberling Sr., 77, German-American inventor of SpaghettiOs, cancer.
- Gustaw Holoubek, 84, Polish film and theatre actor and politician.
- Stanislav Konopásek, 84, Czech ice hockey player, Olympic silver medalist (1948).
- Peter Poreku Dery, 89, Ghanaian cardinal, Archbishop of Tamale (1974–1994).
- Kiddinan Sivanesan, 51, Sri Lankan Tamil Parliament member (TNA), roadside bomb.
- Malvin Wald, 90, American screenwriter (The Naked City).

=== 7 ===
- Ossie Álvarez, 74, American Major League Baseball player (Washington Senators, Detroit Tigers).
- Luisa Isabel Álvarez de Toledo, 71, Spanish noblewoman and author.
- Isaías Carrasco, 43, Spanish Basque politician, shot.
- Leonardo Costagliola, 87, Italian football goalkeeper (ACF Fiorentina).
- Dick Durrell, 82, American founding publisher of People magazine, lung cancer.
- David Gale, 86, American mathematician, heart attack.
- Charles A. Gillespie Jr., 72, American diplomat, Ambassador to Colombia and Chile, cancer.
- Leon Greenman, 97, British Holocaust survivor, only Englishman sent to Auschwitz.
- Julius Paltiel, 83, Norwegian Holocaust survivor.
- Francis Pym, 86, British Conservative Party politician, Foreign Secretary (1982–1983).
- Howard Wing, 92, Chinese Olympic cyclist.

=== 8 ===
- Lucy G. Acosta, 81, Mexican-American activist.
- Sadun Aren, 85, Turkish academic and politician.
- Carol Barnes, 63, British ITN news presenter, stroke.
- Donald C. MacDonald, 94, Canadian politician, former leader of the Ontario New Democratic Party.
- Les Smith, 80, English footballer (Wolves, Aston Villa), cancer.

=== 9 ===
- Varvara Seminnikova, 117, Russian longevity claimant.
- Gus Giordano, 84, American Emmy Award-winning jazz dancer, pneumonia.
- Edward L. Hart, American poet and Mormon hymnwriter.
- Florent Jodoin, 85, Canadian Olympic cyclist.
- Simon Reisman, 88, Canadian chief negotiator of the Canada-United States Free Trade Agreement, cardiac arrest.

=== 10 ===
- Galo Ador Jr., 39, Filipino cartoonist.
- Richard Biegenwald, 67, American serial killer.
- William Bradford, 61, American serial killer, natural causes.
- Hugh Brown, 88, British Labour politician, Parliamentary Under-Secretary of State for Scotland (1974–1979).
- Charles Wayne Day, 65, American blues guitarist, wrote the distinctive riff in "Secret Agent Man".
- Robert P. Foster, 90, American academic administrator, president of Northwest Missouri State University (1964–1977).
- Ricardo García, 81, Mexican Olympic cyclist.
- Dennis Irwin, 56, American jazz double bassist, complications of cancer.
- Ana Kalandadze, 83, Georgian poet.
- Vangelis Kazan, 70, Greek actor.
- Lee Ho-seong, 41, South Korean baseball player, thief and murderer, suicide by drowning.
- Radovan Lukavský, 88, Czech actor.
- Sai Htee Saing, 57, Burmese singer.
- Otto Schnellbacher, 84, American football and basketball player, cancer.

=== 11 ===
- J. I. Albrecht, 77, American-born Canadian manager and director in the Canadian Football League, complications from a stroke.
- Zakaria Deros, 62, Malaysian former politician, heart attack.
- John Roderick, 93, American journalist (AP) and author, extensively covered China (1930s–2000s), heart failure and pneumonia.
- Phyllis Spira, 64, South African prima ballerina, complications of surgery.
- Dave Stevens, 52, American comic book writer and artist (The Rocketeer), leukemia.
- Michael J. Todd, 50, British Chief Constable of Greater Manchester Police, exposure.
- Lukas Vischer, 81, Swiss theologian.

=== 12 ===
- Alan Buckley, 66, British rugby union and rugby league player.
- Folke Eriksson, 82, Swedish Olympic water polo player.
- Erwin Geschonneck, 101, German actor.
- Jorge Guinzburg, 59, Argentine journalist and comedian, pulmonary infection.
- Alun Hoddinott, 78, Welsh composer.
- Cassià Maria Just, 81, Spanish cleric, former abbot of Santa Maria de Montserrat, stroke.
- Howard Metzenbaum, 90, American politician, Senator from Ohio (1974, 1976–1995).
- Ovidiu Iuliu Moldovan, 66, Romanian actor, cancer.
- Károly Németh, 85, Hungarian politician.
- Lazare Ponticelli, 110, Italian-born last official French veteran of World War I.
- Asesela Ravuvu, 77, Fijian politician and former University of the South Pacific academic, natural causes.
- Tom Tuohy, 90, British chemist, averted potential disaster at Windscale.

=== 13 ===
- Tessa Birnie, 73, New Zealand concert pianist.
- Iosif Boyarsky, 90, Russian former Soyuzmultfilm director, one of the fathers of Soviet animation.
- Claire Brooks, 76, British politician.
- Louise Da-Cocodia, 73, British anti-racism campaigner.
- Martin Fierro, 66, American saxophonist, cancer.
- Scarlet Garcia, 23, Filipino model, shot.
- Terry Moloney, 68, Irish hurler.
- Chike Obi, 86, Nigerian mathematician and politician.
- Rafael Tufiño, 85, Puerto Rican painter and printmaker, lung cancer.

=== 14 ===
- Taslim Arif, 53, Pakistani cricketer, lung infection.
- Gary Binfield, 42, British swimmer, heart attack.
- Mel Brandt, 88, American actor and announcer.
- Clyde Cameron, 95, Australian politician, MP (1949–1980), Minister in the Whitlam Government.
- Mike Dawson, 54, American football player, heart attack.
- Stig-Olof Grenner, 68, Finnish Olympic swimmer
- Chiara Lubich, 88, Italian Catholic activist, founder of the Focolare Movement.
- Ingvald Ulveseth, 83, Norwegian politician.

=== 15 ===
- Sambhaji Angre, 87, Indian politician.
- Jacob DeShazer, 95, American bombardier, participant in the Doolittle Raid.
- Mikey Dread, 54, Jamaican singer, record producer and broadcaster, brain tumor.
- Vytautas Kernagis, 56, Lithuanian singer, television announcer, gastric cancer.
- G. David Low, 52, American astronaut, colon cancer.
- Benjamin Ngoubou, 82, Gabonese foreign minister.
- Sam C. Pointer Jr., 73, American federal judge for the District Court for the Northern District of Alabama (1970–2000).
- Ken Reardon, 86, Canadian ice hockey defenceman (Montreal Canadiens), Alzheimer's disease.
- Ross Scaife, 47, American classicist and digital humanist, cancer.
- Yury Tsuranov, 72, Soviet Olympic sport shooter.
- Vicki Van Meter, 26, American pilot, suicide by gunshot.

=== 16 ===
- Anura Bandaranaike, 59, Sri Lankan politician, complications from cancer.
- Bill Brown, 95, Australian cricket captain, member of 1948 Invincibles team.
- Ola Brunkert, 61, Swedish session drummer for ABBA, injuries from accidental fall.
- Wayne Davis, 44, American football player, motor neurone disease.
- Ivan Dixon, 76, American actor (Hogan's Heroes, A Raisin in the Sun, Porgy and Bess), complications from kidney failure.
- Gary Hart, 66, American professional wrestling manager, heart attack.
- John Hewer, 86, British actor (Captain Birdseye), natural causes.
- Otto Jemelka, 93–94, Czech Olympic modern pentathlete.
- Daniel MacMaster, 39, Canadian rock vocalist (Bonham), group A streptococcal infection.
- Mary Meader, 91, American aerial photographer.
- Bob Purkey, 78, American baseball player (Cincinnati Reds, Pittsburgh Pirates), Alzheimer's disease.
- John Shedd Reed, 90, American president of the Atchison, Topeka and Santa Fe Railway (1967–1986), natural causes.
- Laurus Škurla, 80, Slovak-born American first hierarch of the ROCOR.
- Jonathan Williams, 79, American poet, photographer and publisher, founder of The Jargon Society.

=== 17 ===
- Roland E. Arnall, 68, American owner of Ameriquest Mortgage, Ambassador to the Netherlands (2006–2008), cancer.
- Claude Farell, 93, Austrian actress.
- Kim Goetz, 50, American basketball player.
- Claus Luthe, 75, German automobile designer.
- Georges Pisani, 89, French Olympic sailor

=== 18 ===
- Hazel Barnes, 92, American philosopher.
- Andrew Britton, 27, British-born spy novelist, undiagnosed heart condition.
- Mariano Di Gangi, 84, Canadian Presbyterian minister.
- Philip Jones Griffiths, 72, British photojournalist, cancer.
- Martin Halliday, 81, British physician.
- Jyrki Hämäläinen, 65, Finnish journalist, editor of Suosikki magazine.
- Anthony Minghella, 54, British director (The English Patient, Cold Mountain, The Talented Mr. Ripley), Oscar winner (1997), post-surgery haemorrhage.
- Geoffrey Pearson, 80, Canadian diplomat, son of former Prime Minister Lester B. Pearson.
- Anton Pongratz, 60, Romanian Olympic fencer.
- Maral Rahmanzadeh, 92, Azeri painter, visual artist.
- Oreste Rizzini, 67, Italian voice actor, stomach cancer.
- Justin Wright, 27, American animator (Ratatouille), heart attack.

=== 19 ===
- Joe Blackledge, 79, British cricketer, former captain and president of the Lancashire County Cricket Club.
- Sir Arthur C. Clarke, 90, British science fiction author (2001: A Space Odyssey), heart failure.
- Hugo Claus, 78, Belgian author, voluntary euthanasia.
- John Dowie, 93, Australian sculptor, stroke.
- Mia Permanto, 19, Finnish singer, finalist in Idols, accidental drug overdose.
- Raghuvaran, 49, Indian actor, cardiac arrest.
- Paul Scofield, 86, British actor (A Man for All Seasons, Quiz Show, Henry V), Oscar winner (1967), leukaemia.
- Chantal Sébire, 53, French esthesioneuroblastoma patient and euthanasia activist, Pentobarbital overdose

=== 20 ===
- Eric Ashton, 73, British rugby league player for Wigan and Great Britain, cancer.
- Sobhan Babu, 71, Indian actor, cardiac arrest.
- Ann Baumgartner, 89, American aviator.
- Alexandru Custov, 53, Romanian footballer.
- Prince Ferdinand, Duke of Castro, 81, Italian claimant to headship of the House of Bourbon-Two Sicilies.
- Jon Hassler, 74, American author, progressive supranuclear palsy.
- Al Hofmann, 60, American drag racer, heart attack.
- Carlos Galvão de Melo, 86, Portuguese general, Conservative member of National Salvation Junta.
- Bestia Salvaje, 46, Mexican lucha libre wrestler, liver disease.
- Brian Wilde, 80, British actor (Porridge, Last of the Summer Wine, The Dustbinmen).

=== 21 ===
- Gadzhi Abashilov, 58, Russian journalist, chief of VGTRK TV company in Dagestan, shot.
- Anna Alchuk, 52, Russian poet and visual artist, suicide.
- Henri Blaffart, 42, Belgian wildlife conservationist for Conservation International in New Caledonia, drowned.
- Tamás Bujkó, 48, Hungarian judo competitor, stabbed and beaten.
- Denis Cosgrove, 59, British geographer and Alexander von Humboldt professor of geography at UCLA, cancer.
- Klaus Dinger, 61, German drummer (Neu!, Kraftwerk), heart failure.
- Roy Foster, 62, American baseball player (Cleveland Indians).
- Lynne Golding-Kirk, 87, Australian ballerina, complications of surgery.
- George Gross, 85, Canadian sports journalist, founding sports editor of the Toronto Sun, heart attack.
- Shusha Guppy, 72, Iranian writer and singer.
- Raymond Leblanc, 92, Belgian comic book producer and publisher (The Adventures of Tintin).
- John List, 82, American mass murderer, complications from pneumonia.
- Gabriel París Gordillo, 98, Colombian military governor, chairman of Colombian Military Junta.
- Waltrude Schleyer, 92, German widow of Hanns-Martin Schleyer, advocate against the Red Army Faction.
- Ilyas Shurpayev, 32, Russian journalist responsible for North Caucasus news on Channel One, murder by strangulation.
- Merv Wallace, 91, New Zealand cricket captain (1952–1953).

=== 22 ===
- Robert Dyk, 71, American television reporter (ABC News, WMTW-TV), cancer.
- Cachao, 89, Cuban musician credited with creating mambo, renal failure.
- Robert J. McIntosh, 85, American politician, U.S. Representative from Michigan (1957–1959).
- Harvey Picker, 92, American philanthropist.
- Adolfo Suárez Rivera, 81, Mexican cardinal, Archbishop Emeritus of Monterrey, brain hemorrhage.

=== 23 ===
- Abdallah al-Ajmi, 29, Kuwaiti bomber, suicide by explosive vest.
- Big Jack Armstrong, 62, American radio DJ.
- Heath Benedict, 24, American football offensive lineman (Newberry College), 2008 NFL draft prospect, hypertrophic cardiomyopathy.
- Al Copeland, 64, American restaurateur, founder of Popeyes Chicken, salivary gland cancer.
- Hugo Correa, 81, Chilean journalist and science fiction writer.
- Maryam Farman Farmaian, 94, Iranian feminist activist.
- E. A. Markham, 68, Montserrat-born British poet and writer.
- George Switzer, 92, American mineralogist, acquired the Hope Diamond for the Smithsonian Institution, pneumonia.
- Chase Tatum, 34, American World Championship Wrestling wrestler and road manager for Outkast, apparent accidental drug overdose.
- Vaino Vahing, 68, Estonian writer and psychiatrist.

=== 24 ===
- Severin Cecile Abega, 52, Cameroonian author and anthropologist.
- Chalmers Alford, 53, American jazz guitarist, diabetes.
- Neil Aspinall, 66, British road manager for The Beatles and executive of Apple Corps, lung cancer.
- Rafael Azcona, 81, Spanish screenwriter, lung cancer.
- Victor Christ-Janer, 92, American architect.
- John Cushley, 65, Scottish footballer (Celtic, West Ham United), motor neurone disease.
- Ray Drinkwater, 76, British footballer (Queens Park Rangers).
- Boris Dvornik, 68, Croatian actor, stroke.
- Mary Joan Nielubowicz, 79, American head of the Navy Nurse Corps (1983–1987).
- Hal Riney, 75, American advertising executive, founder of Publicis & Hal Riney, cancer.
- Dina Sassoli, 87, Italian actress.
- Sam Toy, 84, British chair of Ford UK (1980–1986).
- Richard Widmark, 93, American actor (Kiss of Death, Judgment at Nuremberg, Against All Odds).
- Sherri Wood, 28, Canadian journalist (Toronto Sun), brain cancer.

=== 25 ===
- Art Aragon, 80, American boxer, stroke.
- Ben Carnevale, 92, American college basketball coach.
- Tony Church, 77, British actor.
- Jimmy Dell, 83, British Wing Commander and test pilot.
- Ronald Dick, 76, British Royal Air Force officer.
- Thierry Gilardi, 49, French journalist and TF1 sports commentator, heart attack.
- William G. Hyland, 79, American intelligence official.
- Sergey Kramarenko, 61, Russian football player.
- Abby Mann, 80, American screenwriter (Judgment at Nuremberg), Oscar winner (1962), heart failure.
- Herb Peterson, 89, American fast food pioneer, inventor of the McDonald's Egg McMuffin.
- Gene Puerling, 78, American vocal jazz musician, singer, musical arranger for the Hi-Los and Singers Unlimited.
- Edward Rafeedie, 79, American senior judge for the California Central District Court, cancer.
- Sérgio de Souza, 73, Brazilian journalist, co-founder and editor of Caros Amigos magazine, respiratory illness.
- Ivan Toms, 55, South African physician, activist against apartheid and conscription, meningitis.

=== 26 ===
- Hawley Ades, 99, American choral arranger.
- Christian Bergelin, 62, French politician.
- Robert Fagles, 74, American professor, poet and translator of ancient epics, prostate cancer.
- Donald Hunter, 81, English footballer (Southport).
- Manuel Marulanda, 78, Colombian founder and commander-in-chief of terrorist organization FARC.
- Wally Phillips, 82, American radio personality, pioneer of talk radio, Alzheimer's disease.

=== 27 ===
- Jean-Marie Balestre, 86, French former president of FISA and later FIA.
- Beverly Broadman, 60, American broadcaster with CNN and CBS News, cancer.
- Billy Consolo, 73, American baseball player and coach, heart attack.
- George Pruteanu, 60, Romanian literary critic and senator, heart attack.

=== 28 ===
- Mohammad Asaduzzaman, 60, Bangladeshi university academic and administrator, cardiac arrest.
- Lorne Ferguson, 77, Canadian ice hockey player.
- Kunio Lemari, 65, Marshall Islands acting President (1996–1997).
- Michael Podro, 77, British art historian.
- Herb Rich, 79, American football player.
- Ron Slinker, 62, American professional wrestler.
- Helen Yglesias, 92, American novelist.

=== 29 ===
- Fereydun Adamiyat, 87, Iranian historian.
- Albert Alcalay, 90, American abstract artist.
- Angus Fairhurst, 41, British artist, suicide by hanging.
- Allan Ganley, 77, British jazz drummer.
- Josef Mikl, 78, Austrian painter, cancer.
- Isabella Nardoni, 5, Brazilian murder victim, thrown out of window.
- Ralph Rapson, 93, American architect, heart attack.
- Jock Stallard, 86, British Labour MP and life peer.
- Myint Thein, 62, Burmese National League for Democracy spokesman, stomach cancer.

=== 30 ===
- Marie-Françoise Audollent, 64, French actress, accidental fall.
- Anders Göthberg, 32, Swedish guitarist (Broder Daniel).
- Douglas Kent Hall, 69, American writer and photographer.
- David Leslie, 54, British racing driver and commentator, Farnborough air crash.
- Sean Levert, 39, American R&B singer.
- Richard Lloyd, 63, British racing driver and team owner, Farnborough air crash.
- Jim Mooney, 88, American comic book artist (Batman, Spider-Man, Thor).
- David D. Newsom, 90, American Ambassador to the Philippines (1977–1978), respiratory failure.
- Dith Pran, 65, Cambodian-born American journalist, survivor of the Killing Fields, pancreatic cancer.

=== 31 ===
- Pippa Bacca, 33, Italian performance and feminist artist, strangulation.
- Nikolai Baibakov, 97, Russian economist, Gosplan head (1955–1957, 1965–1985), pneumonia.
- Jules Dassin, 96, American film director (The Naked City, Rififi, Never on Sunday), influenza.
- William Louis Dickinson, 82, American judge and Representative from Alabama (1965–1993), colon cancer.
- Eliyahu Boruch Finkel, 60, Israeli rabbi and lecturer.
- Robert F. Goheen, 88, American President of Princeton University (1957–1972), Ambassador to India (1977–1980), heart failure.
- Bill Keightley, 81, American equipment manager for Kentucky Wildcats men's basketball since 1962, bleeding from spinal tumor.
- Halszka Osmólska, 77, Polish palaeontologist.
- David Todd, 93, American architect, designed Manhattan Plaza, former chairman of NYC Landmarks Preservation Commission.
