= Gadzhi =

Gadzhi may refer to:

People:

- Gadzhi Abashilov (1950–2008), Russian journalist and chief of Dagestan's outlet of state-owned VGTRK media company
- Gadzhi Gadzhiev (born 1945), Russian football manager, currently coaching Anzhi Makhachkala
- Gadzhi Navruzov (born 1989), Russian professional football player

Places:

- Gadzhi-Eynali, village in the Masally Rayon of Azerbaijan
