= Guerrilla phase of the Second Chechen War (2008) =

Part of a Russian war in the Caucasus

== Timeline ==
=== January ===
- January 1 – Three high-ranking police officers were assassinated in separate incidents in Chechnya and Dagestan, local Interior Ministry officials said. Rebel sources said 7 pro-Russian policemen were killed in a series of sniper attacks in Grozny.
- January 8 – Police killed two rebels in the Derbent district of Dagestan, Russian media reported. A group of rapid-response policemen were shot at in Ingushetia, killing one and wounding another, Interfax reported.
- January 10 – Six rebels were killed during a two-day operation's in Tabasaran district of Dagestan, Dagestan Interior Ministry said. Internal Troops soldier was wounded. One of Doku Umarov's men was killed in Grozny, Chechen Interior Minister said. A car bomb in Dagestan injured Gazi Gaziyev, a deputy of the Dagestan's People Assembly and the regional railways chief, and his driver.
- January 14 – An apartment siege in Makhachkala, capital of Dagestan, ended with three alleged guerrillas killed and one policeman injured, the local police chief said. In Chechnya gunmen killed one police officer and wounded another in a southern forested area. A suspected militant was killed in an exchange of gunfire in the center of Grozny, the ministry said. A resident of the Ingush village of Kantyshevo, was killed in a shoot-out in the village of Verkhniye Achaluki in Ingushetia's Malgobeksky district.
- January 15 – Police attacked a home in Grozny, killing four suspected rebels, including Uvais Tachiyev, the alleged leader of a rebel group, while one OMON officer was wounded, Chechnya's Interior Ministry said. Kavkaz Center claimed one police officer died and another one was wounded, when militants attacked a police car near the village of Achaluki, Ingushetia.
- January 16 – RIA Novosti reported that one police officer was killed and six others wounded in the a clash with rebels in the Vedensky District, and that one militant was killed in retaliatory fire. Itar Tass reported that the body of the deputy commander of the Ingushetian OMON, Senior Lieutenant Movsar Martazanov, was found in the city of Karabulak, Ingushetia with numerous gunshot wounds. Chechenpress claimed several Russian and pro-Russian troops were killed during a fierce fight in the Kurchaloyevsky District.
- January 18 – Chechenpress reported that large-scale battles broke out in the area of Marzoi-Mohk in the Vedensky District and in the village of Alleroi in the Kurchaloyevsky District during previous week, resulting in the deaths of about 20–30 Russian and pro-Russian troops.
- January 19 – Itar Tass reported that two policemen were wounded in shooting in Chechnya, near the village of Serzhen-Yurt; Kavkaz Center claimed at least two Spetsnaz soldiers were killed and three or four wounded in the shootout. Chechenpress reported that the Russian forces suffered on that day one fatal loss and nine injuries in the fighting in the area of the villages of Niki-Hita and Marzoi-Mohk. An armored vehicle collided with a bus in Chechnya's capital Grozny, killing a woman an injuring five people, Chechen parliamentarian Sharal Beldurov told Interfax.
- January 20 – Two Interior Troops soldiers were killed and one wounded in a rebel attack in eastern Chechnya, a Ministry source reported.
- January 21 – Kavkaz Center reported that "many soldiers" died during four days of fighting near Marzoi-Mohk in the Kurchaloyevsky District. Russian agencies did not report on fighting in this district since January 16. KC reported simultaneous attacks on police stations and border troops in Nazran; no casualties were reported by the Russian sources.
- January 22 – Gunmen ambushed a minibus in Ingushetia killing one soldier and injuring three army officers, after a car carrying explosives blew up killing the driver, news agencies reported.
- January 23 – Two Russian servicemen were killed and three more wounded in an attack on a car in Ingushetia, RIA Novosti reported. RIAN also reported two militants were killed and one fatally wounded in a shootout with federal troops in Dagestan.
- January 25 – Kavkaz Center claimed heavy fighting near Vedeno killed at least 8 soldiers and wounded 9 others as well as several rebels. They also claimed militants attacked a UAZ vehicle near Grozny, killing one soldier and wounding 3 others.
- January 27 – A Russian serviceman and a local policeman were killed in a battle with rebels during a security sweep in the Nozhai-Yurt region in southern Chechnya's mountains, officials said. Another two local police officers were wounded and two rebels were killed in the ensuing gunbattle, Russia's Interior Ministry said.
- January 28 – One serviceman was killed and another three were wounded in a shootout with militants near the village of Bamut, Achkhoy-Martanovsky District. As a result of the attack, the next day the Chechen village Gekhi 25 kilometers away has been subject to artillery fire, leading to protests from the republic's President Ramzan Kadyrov. A day later Kavkaz Center claimed that a Russian base in Bamut was attacked by heavy machine guns, light mortars and grenade launchers, killing seven soldiers and injuring nine.
- January 30 – A policeman was killed and another one wounded by rebels in the village of Ekazhevo in Ingushetia's Nazranovsky district, Prague Watchdog reported. In a separate incident, two young men, Ramzan Nalgiyev and Dzhabrail Mutsulgov, were killed in the Ingush village of Surkhakhi. According to local law enforcers they were involved in acts of terrorism, but relatives said they were innocent civilians. A contract serviceman has been "abducted" on a reconnaissance operation in Chechnya, law enforcement sources told Interfax. Rebel sources later reported the servicemen was executed, after interrogation; the execution was said to be revenge for the dead of two women, Malika and Zama, who died during a December 2007 sweep operation in Grozny.

=== February ===
- February 2 – Two officers of the Chechen Interior Ministry's Second Traffic Police Regiment were killed and another one was wounded in armed clash near the village of Mesedoi in the Vedeno district Chechnya, Interfax reported.
- February 3 – Ingush police source told Itar Tass that the militants opened fire at a Nazran police patrol from a car, injuring three policemen and a refugee from Chechnya.
- February 7 – Police killed 2 suspected militants in a shootout in the village of Avadan in Dagestan on the border with Azerbaijan and apprehended a third. 2 policemen were badly wounded and one militant was killed in an attack on the policemen, Itar Tass reported. One of the policemen lost his leg in the assault Two young men were also reported to be forcibly disappeared in the republic in late January. The Grozny Garrison Military Court handed down a three-year suspended sentence for "negligence" to Interior Ministry Troops Lieutenant Colonel Aleksei Korgun. Korgun pleaded guilty to having given the command to open fire on March 24, 2007, on three women, killing one and injuring two.
- February 9 – Alkavkaz claimed an IED killed at least 3 soldiers in the Nozhay-Yurt district, Chechnya.
- February 11 – 2 rebels were detained in Chechnya, officials reported. Alkavkaz claimed at least 2 soldiers were killed by an IED in the Vedeno-district, Chechnya.
- February 12 – 3 rebels and a district police chief were killed and 3 policemen were wounded (including at least one badly wounded) during a gun battle in Dagestan, regional Interior Ministry said. Also in Dagestan, a roadside bomb hit a police car near the town of Khasavyurt, severely wounding one policeman. Muhannad, leader of the Arab Mujahideen in Chechnya has been reportedly killed by officers of the Russian Interior Ministry during a search operation near the village of Arshty in Ingushetia, a source in the Ministry told Interfax. Interfax refuted Muhannad's death the same day, saying it was a different militant
- February 13 – 2 militants and one FSB officer were killed in a shoot-out in the village of Lukovskaya in North Ossetia, according to Russian media. Interfax reported a total of four people had died.
- February 14 – Militants fired at a police vehicle in Nazran, Ingushetia, wounding 6 officers, Interfax reported.
- February 15 – 4 rebels were killed, in a clash near Chechnya's Shatoysky district, the Chechen ministry reported. Before the battle the militants had attacked a police transport vehicle. No reports on federal casualties were made.
- February 15 – Alkavkaz claimed at least two soldiers were killed in fighting near Tsa-Vedeno village in the Vedeno district, Chechnya
- February 20 – A police officer died and others were wounded, when militants attacked a checkpoint in Ingushetia, Interfax reported. In a separate incident in Ingushetia, one MVD officer was killed and another one was wounded, when militants launched an attack, Ingushetiya.ru reported. An alleged militant leader has been detained in Dagestan, officials reported.
- February 22 – 2 police officers were wounded in Ingushetia, after militants opened fire, Interfax reported. Rebel sources claimed, at least 1 officer was killed and 5 others were wounded. One of the officers died in the hospital. Rebel sources reported a UAZ military vehicle exploded in Chechnya killing 3 soldiers and seriously wounding 2 others. A police officer accidentally shot his colleague dead at a check-point near the Ingush village of Yandare, Interfax reported
- February 23 – Two officers were wounded, when Militants attacked a Police vehicle in Ingushetia, Interfax reported.
- February 26 – Rebel sources claimed 3 police officers were killed and more injured in an ambush near the village of Zhani-Vedeno, Chechnya.
- February 28 – Two males and a pregnant woman were killed in a counter-terrorist operation in the suburb of Nazran, Ingushetia. Security forces assure that the killed were militants who offered armed resistance, but their family and neighbours said no armed resistance was given and the victims weren't militants. The bodies were returned to their relatives next month without their internal organs.

=== March ===
- March 1 – Alkavkaz claimed 2 soldiers were killed and three wounded, after a military vehicle was blown up by militants in Chechnya's Nozhay-Yurt district.
- March 5 – Rebel sources claimed one soldier was killed and 4 wounded, after rebels detonated an IED on a BTR armored personnel carrier in Chechnya's Nozhay-Yurt region.
- March 6 – A detained suspect wounded a high-ranking policeman while attempting to escape from investigation prison in Ingushetia, Russian media reported. The suspect then blew himself up with a grenade.
- March 7 – The head of the North Ossetian Interior Ministry's UBOP (Organized Crime Squad) Mark Metsayev was assassinated in the capital Vladikavkaz. Investigators established that his car was rammed and was then shot dead by three gunmen who fled the scene. The Ossetian Jamaat Kataib al-Khoul claimed responsibility for the assassination. Two police officers were wounded, after militants opened fire near the administration building in the village of Ekazhevo in Ingushetia. A police officer was wounded in Grozny, Chechnya, after unknown gunmen opened fire.
- March 11 – A Russian soldier was injured by a mine blast in Chechnya's Shalinsky District. Alkavkaz claimed three soldiers were killed and four wounded during fighting Chechnya's Shalinsky District. At least one soldier was injured in Shali according to Livechechnya. Alkavkaz claimed two soldiers were killed and two wounded, after militants bombed a Ural truck in Chechnya's Kurchaloy district. The bombing was confirmed by the authorities, but no casualties were reported.
- March 14 – Up to 6 guerrillas and at least 2 Russian MVD servicemen died during an operation in Dagestan's Buynaksk district, law enforcement authorities reported. Three are other servicemen were reported wounded. Rebels confirmed the deaths of 5 guerrillas and claimed six soldiers were killed and four wounded. In two separate incidents, one FSB officer was killed and two others were wounded by militants in Ingushetia, and a police lieutenant was fatally shot in his car in Ingushetia by a gunman. Chechnya's First Deputy Interior Minister Nikolai Simakov claimed police killed 19 insurgents and arrested 78 since 2008.
- March 15 – Alkavkaz claimed 3 soldiers were killed, when guerrillas attacked a Russian BTR in Chechnya's Vedeno district.
- March 16 – Rebel websites confirmed the deaths of 3 guerrillas killed during fighting in Chechnya's Vedeno district. A UAZ vehicle with 5 OMOM members was damaged by a roadbomb in Kabardino-Balkaria, reportedly no casualties.
- March 17 – Reports came out that an assassination attempt on Putin and Medvedev had been foiled on March 2. A sniper, allegedly a Tajik national, was arrested with a sniper rifle inside an apartment that oversaw Putin and Medvedev on the day of the presidential elections in Russia. The FSB refutes these reports. KavkazCenter had published an article on March 7 that they had information from inside the Chechnya's government that the FSB planned to assassinate Medvedev to keep Putin in power, and they described Medvedev would be assassinated by sniper fire. The former chairman of the state farm in Mutsalaul, Dagestan was assassinated in Khasavyurt, Dagestan. A Russian armored personnel carrier was attacked with a roadside bomb in Grozny, Chechnya, reportedly with no casualties. Another roadside bomb went off in Kabardino-Balkaria, reportedly nobody suffered.
- March 19 – At least 5 law-enforcement officers, at least 3 rebels and at least 2 civilians were killed in a raid on an administration building in Chechnya's Urus-Martan district, during which rebels held the village of Alkhazurovo for hours. Rebels reported that a group of 70 rebel fighters had entered Alkhazurovo and that no fewer than 13 policemen had been killed in the ensuing battle, with 7–10 policemen wounded and several taken prisoner. Police confirmed the deaths of four policemen and an employee of the military prosecutor's office, as well as three more wounded. Both sides blamed each other for the civilian casualties. Two large military bases were present 6 and 7 kilometers away from the scene, but no backup had arrived. A roadside bomb damaged two Russian armoured personnel carriers and wounded two soldiers in Ingushetia.
- March 20 – 2 police officers were shot overnight in Moscow. Police returned fire, wounding the assailant, who was subsequently detained while the other assailant escaped Ria Novosti reported. A police car was blown-up in Ingushetia, one officer was wounded. A police officer was wounded, when a police car was fired at in Kabardino-Balkaria. The European Court of Human Rights condemned Russia for the disappearance of two Chechen brothers, Lom-Ali and Umar-Ali Aziyev, in Grozny in September 2000.
- March 21 – A car with 5 police officers was fired at in Grozny, Chechnya, wounding one officer. A bomb exploded at a police checkpoint in Ingushetia, reportedly nobody was hurt. Russian ministry reported 61 Russian troops were killed in 2008 An official was wounded by a grenade blast in Dagestan's derbentskeyeo district. Ilyas Shurpayev, Russia's First Channel correspondent in Dagestan, and Gadzhi Abashilov, head of the local TV station GTRK Dagestan, whose names had allegedly been put on a blacklist of journalists by a Dagestani weekly newspaper, were killed in Moscow and Makhachkala, respectively.
- March 23 – Guerrillas in Chechnya opened fire on an FSB Mi-8 helicopter, which was damaged and reportedly made an emergency landing. A police officer was injured and a local killed during a skirmish with rebels in Urus-Martan, Chechnya. Alkavkaz claimed 2 federals were killed and others wounded by a road-bomb in Chechnya's Shali district.
- March 24 – At least 2 police officers were killed in Chechnya's Kurchaloyevsky District and at least one police officer was killed and another wounded, when gunmen attacked a police vehicle in Khasav-yurt, Dagestan. Kavkaz Center claimed three officers were killed and more wounded in the attack in Chechnya and that two officers were killed in the attack in Dagestan and two others heavily wounded. At least 4 people including at least 2 police officers were injured, when a car bomb detonated near a bank in the city of Nazran, Ingushetia. Reportedly the police officers were seriously wounded. Kavkaz Center claimed all four victims were police officers. A resident, Khazbulat Sharipov aged 19, was shot dead by Kadyrovtsy officers near Grozny, Chechnya, allegedly for offering armed resistance during a passport check. Rebels claimed four officers were killed and more wounded during an ambush in a village in Chechnya's Nozhay-Yurt district. Two MVD officers were seriously injured because of rockfall in Chechnya's Shatoi district.
- March 25 – Two Ossetian police officers were injured on the border with Ingushetia, after rebels opened fire.
- March 26 – Alkavkaz claimed 3 servicemen were killed and more wounded, when guerrillas blew up a Russian BTR near Vedeno.
- March 27 – Three alleged guerrillas have been killed in the town of Dagestanskiye Ogni, East Dagestan, Russian media reported.

=== April ===
- April 1 – Three military officers have been injured in Chechnya, after an armored vehicle explosion, Interfax reported. A civilian was killed, when an IED missed a bus of police guards in Makhachkala, Dagestan. A Russian contract soldier was shot dead by one of his colleagues, which was reported to be an accident.
- April 3 – Rebels held the village of Yandi-Kotar, in Chechnya's Urus-Martan district, for several hours, a resident told Kavkazy-Uzel, conducting a search operation for police staff in people's homes. A Vedeno policeman reported that infrequently rebels set up checkpoints to kill those who show police ID as one of their new tactics.
- April 5 – Three Russian servicemen were wounded, when militants fired on a military police convoy in Ingushetia's Sunzhensky district.
- April 6 – A local resident was severely injured, when his car was hit by an armored personnel carrier, with about 200 angry residents preventing the APC from leaving until police had arrived. Since 2002, there have been five accidents involving armored military vehicles and civilian transport in Ingushetia, in which civilians have been killed or seriously injured.
- April 11 – A police officer was killed and several more wounded, when their car came under fire by militants in Sagopshi, Ingushetia.
- April 13 – A top judge, Khasan Yandiev, deputy head of Ingushetia's Supreme Court, was assassinated in Karabulak, Ingushetia. Yandiev had chaired trials of both Islamic rebels and corrupt officials. A Dagestani militant leader, Ismail Yangizbiyev, was killed in Khasavyurt, Dagestan. Two police officers died in a frontal crash with another vehicle, severely injuring two other persons, in Gudermes, Chechnya.
- April 15 – A military vehicle carrying 4 special forces members was ambushed in Nalchik, Kabardino-Balkaria, but reportedly nobody was injured.
- April 16 – One Russian soldier was killed and another "gravely" wounded, when an IED exploded a gas pipe in Grozny, Chechnya. Nine officers from a special purpose police unit have been injured, when militants raided an OMON base in Karabulak, Ingushetia. A local resident, allegedly one of the participants, was detained. Many police vehicles were damaged in the raid and at least one of the wounded is said to be in "grave condition".
- April 18 – The chief of the police in Chechnya's Sunzhensky District, Ali Gaytamurov was found shot dead in Assinovskaya, Ingushetia, after he was abducted on April 17. In the same night the administration building of Assinovskaya was set on fire and burned down. An explosive device blew up in the home of the mayor of Nazran, Ingushetia, Beyali Oozdoeva in a possible assassination attempt, but nobody was hurt.
- April 20 – A Russian deputy commander of a spetsnaz company of the Internal Troops, Sr. Lieutenant Eugene Dzhandarov, was killed and a soldier heavily wounded during a skirmish in the village of Eshelkhatoy, in Chechnya's Vedeno District. Two young girls were shot dead, according to Chechnya's human rights ombudsman Nurdi Nukhazhiev, when someone fired on the car, in which the representative of the Chechen human rights ombudsman in the Vedeno district, Khasambek Zubairaev, was driving. The gunfire reportedly killed Zubairaev's two nieces, aged 5 and 8, and wounded his brother and sister. Nukhaziev alleged that forces of Sulim Yamadayev's Vostok Spetsnaz battalion carried out the attack. No details about the shooting incident or who may have been responsible for it were provided by law-enforcement or other relevant government agencies.
- April 21 – Police reported of a large-scale raid by rebel forces in several villages in the Urus-Martan and Achkhoi-Martan districts of Chechnya. According to their data the rebel forces were numbered around 80-100and that 23 Kadyrovtsy officers were killed, 15 captured and many buildings and vehicles destroyed.
- April 22 – An Mi-8 helicopter of the FSB was heavily damaged by gunfire and made a successful emergency landing in the Achkhoi-Martan district of Chechnya, Law-Enforcement agencies reported.
- April 23 – At least two FSB colleagues were heavily injured, according to the Ria news agency, when their car was fired at by militants in the settlement of Surkhakhi in the Nazran region of Ingushetia. The site Ingushetiya.ru reported instead that 3 colleagues were killed and one was heavily wounded.
- April 24 – Two soldiers were wounded, of which at least one heavily, by an explosive device at a checkpoint near Nazran, Ingushetia. According to Ingushetiya.ru a military vehicle was damaged during the explosion.
- April 27 – According to the Russian Joint Group of Forces in the North Caucasus, 32 insurgents and 17 federal troops had been killed since March 2008.
- April 29 – Two rebel fighters were killed in Chechnya's Vedeno district, according to local military officials. The rebels were allegedly involved in the April 20 shooting, in which by some reports two girls died. A wounded rebel was detained, after being hurt while trying to plant a mine in Chechnya's Vedeno district according to Chechnya's MVD. A Russian contract soldier was injured, when militants fired at a group of soldiers in South-Eastern Chechnya, Chechnya's MVD reported.

=== May ===
- May 2 – At least one soldier and an officer were killed and another officer wounded during a clash in Urus-Martan Chechnya, in which participated an estimated 30 rebels, Federal officials reported. The officers were of the Kadyrov patrol regiment. An estimated four rebels were wounded as traces of blood were later found on the forest tracks. The rebel-linked website Kavkaz Center however, claimed that at least nine law enforcement officers were killed in a gunfight that lasted for four hours. One officer was wounded by gunfire in Nazran, Ingushetia, Interfax reported.
- May 4 – The commander of a detachment of Kadyrov's patrol service regiment was assassinated near his home in the Vedeno region of Chechnya, Itar Tass reported. A contract soldier was killed, when his car fell down a cliff in the Shamilskogo region of Dagestan. The cause was said to be rockfall. The house of a former Federal officer was fired at by a grenade launcher in Ingushetia, but nobody was hurt according to police reports.
- May 5 – Five police officers were killed and two others heavily wounded by a roadside bomb in Grozny, the capital of Chechnya. The officers were working on security ahead of the inauguration of Russia's president Dmitry Medvedev. In a separate incident, another officer was killed in Grozny, after unidentified assailants opened fire on two police trucks, carrying eight officers. A mass grave with seven bodies was discovered in Gudermes, Chechnya, officials reported. One soldier was wounded by a mine-blast in Chechnya's Vedeno district, officials reported. At least one serviceman was wounded in Nazran, Ingushetia by militant fire.
- May 6 – One soldier was killed and 14 others heavily wounded, when their Ural vehicle overturned In Ingushetia's Nazran district. The official cause was reported to be a human error. A skirmish between Russian servicemen and up to 15 guerrillas occurred in Komsomol, Chechnya. Chechnya's MVD reported there were no victims.
- May 12 – One soldier was injured, when guerrillas attacked a checkpoint in Shelkovskiy, Chechnya.
- May 14 – Three policemen were killed near Nazran, Ingushetia, after their patrol vehicle had been ambushed on a highway.
- May 15 – Two MVD officers were killed and one police officer heavily wounded during an ambush on their vehicle in Gubden, karabudakhkentskogo region, Dagestan. A police checkpoint was ambushed in the Sunsha region of Chechnya, but reportedly there were no casualties.
- May 18 – Three soldiers, including a commander and deputy commander, were injured during a skirmish with an estimated 15 guerrillas in Tangi, Chechnya. One official was wounded, when guerrillas attacked a police base.
- May 19 – An ex- MVD officer was injured by an explosive device in Nalchik, Kabardino-Balkaria.
- May 20 – Two MVD officers Pyatigorsk were injured, when their vehicle was fired at by gunmen. According to the commander of the Combined Group of Forces in the North Caucasus, Major General Nikolai Sivak stated that 17 Russian servicemen had been killed so far in 2008, an increase compared to last year. He also claimed that 32 guerrillas had been killed.
- May 21 – A soldier of the Dagestani SOBR was killed along with a guerrilla who refused to surrender, after militants had surrounded his apartment in Makhachkala, Dagestan. One additional officer was wounded. One gunmen was killed and an MVD officer wounded in the Nadterechniy district of Chechnya. A high-ranking military official was gravely wounded by small arms fire in Grozny, Chechnya.
- May 23 – Two Interior Ministry troops were wounded by an explosive device in the Sunzhensky district of Ingushetia. A group of guerrillas attacked a military post in Nazran, Ingushetia. Reportedly nobody was injured.
- May 24 – An UBOP officer and a guard were shot dead in the village of Dugulubgei, Kabardino-Balkaria. A guerrilla commander by the name of Abu Isupkhadzhiev was killed, when he blew himself with a hand grenade to avoid being captured, after being surrounded by militants in the village of Valerik, Achkhoi-Martan district, Chechnya. Russian forces clashed with a group of nine gunmen, near the town of Gandalbos, Ingushetia, close by another clash occurred with another group of militants numbering about 30, but no casualties are reported. A 17-year-old schoolboy was injured, when a vehicle was shot at carrying several schoolboys. Authorities blame federal soldiers for the shooting, but opposition website ingushetiya.ru quoted eyewitnesses who are convinced the shooting was done by Ingush militias.
- May 25 – A high-ranking officer, Colonel Akhmedudin Absaludinov, was assassinated in Makhachkala, Dagestan.
- May 26 – An explosive device planted under a car belonging to a top official from Dagestan's Finance Ministry went off in Makhachkala, Dagestan. According to a police source, the explosion seriously damaged the car, but no one was injured in the attack.
- May 28 – A senior lieutenant was severely wounded by a gunshot wound to the chest in Achkhoy-Martan, Chechnya, which was said to be self-inflicted.
- May 29 – Three Russian servicemen were killed and one wounded, when gunmen opened fire on their vehicle near the village of Verkhnie Achaluki in Ingushetia. One contract soldier was heavily injured by an improvised explosive device (IED) in Komsomol, Chechnya.
- May 30 – A former deputy in Ingushetia's parliament and a cousin of the republic's ex-president Ruslan Aushev was heavily injured by gunshots in Ingushetia. A gunman attacked police officers in Nalchik, Kabardino-Balkaria. Reportedly nobody suffered. The gunman was reportedly arrested the next day.

=== June ===
- June 1 – A deputy in the parliament of Karachaevo-Cherkessia, Murat Akbaev, was assassinated in the republic's capital, Cherkessk. An alleged rebel was killed in Grozny, Chechnya, after refusing to surrender.
- June 2 – A police officer was killed, after an estimated 4 to 5 fighters attacked a checkpoint near Malgobek, Ingushetia. Police officers were injured, when fighters attacked them near the village of Kantyshevo, Ingushetia. A Russian soldier was heavily wounded by a mine-blast in Yandy, Chechnya. Guerrillas attacked a checkpoint in the village of Kiri, in the Sharoyskiy region of Chechnya. Reportedly there were no casualties.
- June 3 – An Mi-8 helicopter carrying 12 soldiers was shot at and heavily damaged in the Vedeno district of Chechnya. One contract soldier was wounded. One fighter was killed, and two police officers heavily wounded during a special operation in Yandare, Ingushetia.
- June 5 – One person was killed and two others heavily wounded, when their vehicle came under fire in the Urus-Martan region of Chechnya. Officials suspect rebels of carrying out the attack, having assumed that the residents were police officers.
- June 6 – An explosion ripped apart a car carrying a district police chief in Chechnya, gunmen then shot at the burning vehicle killing the police chief and wounding 2 others.
- June 7 – Russian special forces killed 3 rebels during a shootout with rebels in Khasavyurt, Dagestan. One of the rebels was a 15-year-old wrestling champion named Movsar Shaipov.
- June 8 – The head of the anti-organized crime directorate (UBOP) of Ingushetia's Interior Ministry, Bembulat Bogolov, was shot to death in Nazran. One soldier was killed and another seriously wounded, when gunmen attacked the group near a rail terminal in the town of Khasavyurt, west of Dagestan's capital Makhachkala. A skirmish occurred near Vedeno, Chechnya, between soldiers and 3 fighters, but reportedly nobody was injured on the federal side. The next day officers delayed a wounded fighter linked to the skirmish.
- June 9 – A bomb exploded in a café frequented by police in Chechnya seriously injuring 5 policemen and 2 bystanders. The café is located not far from the base of a Chechen Interior Ministry OMON special unit. One soldier was killed and another wounded, when guerrillas fired on a military train. Gunmen shot and killed a senior lieutenant of the police in the city of Nazran, Ingushetia. One soldier was injured by a gunman in Tyrnyauze, Kabardino-Balkaria. A bomb exploded in Nazran near the home of Magomed Khazbiev, the head of the organizing committee for the Ingush national protest, but nobody was hurt.
- June 11 – Russian special forces killed five people, including one woman, in an operation against insurgents in the southern region of Ingushetia police reported. Unknown fighters attempted to blow up soldiers of the OMON special unit in Chechnya's Shali district, but reportedly nobody was hurt. The Jamestown Foundation notes that this attack, and the June 9 café bombing might be carried out by the Federal Zapad battalion as an act of revenge.
- June 13 – A large group of 25–60 rebels led by "Amir Aslanbek" launched raids against Chechen police and Kadyrovtsy in the eastern village of Benoi, Chechnya. According to Kavkaz Center 12 Kadyrovtsy were killed in the raid, 19 wounded and 13 officers were captured for intelligence purposes and later released as well as loads of weapons and ammo taken from police officers houses and 15 houses belonging to police officers were burnt down.
- June 14 – Two alleged rebels, including one female, were killed during a special police operation in the village of Bairamaul in Dagestan's Khasavyurt district. A blast in Makhachkala, Dagestan, killed a resident, after it went off near an administrative buildings. The victim was a jogger believed to have inadvertently triggered the bomb.
- June 16 – Three FSB border guards were killed and five wounded, when militants attacked an FSB automobile column in the village of Chishki in Chechnya's Groznensky district, which was traveling to Vladikavkaz. The three slain border guards were reported as Captain Vladimir Karasev of Ryazan Oblast, Senior Lieutenant Yevgeny Klyukin of Saransk in the Republic of Mordovia and Junior Sergeant Pyotr Bravok of Bryansk Oblast. The rebel website Kavkaz Center claimed the attack was a "final examination for young mujahideen". A police officer was heavily wounded in the Vedeno region of Chechnya by an explosive device. A Nazranovskogo ROVD officer and his relative were wounded by militants in Nazran Ingushetia. In an earlier attack on officers in Nazran one officer received light injuries. Fighters destroyed a BMP-vehicle In the village of Bamut in the Achkhoy-Martanovskogo region of Chechnya. Reportedly no officers suffered in the attack, but a local bystander received light injuries.
- June 20 – Two attacks on police officers occurred in the town of Khasavyurt and in the Sergokalinskiy region of Dagestan. Reportedly nobody was hurt in either of the attacks.
- June 21 – Three MVD officers were wounded and one rebel reportedly killed during a skirmish between MVD officers and a group of an estimated ten rebels in the populated area of Makhkety, Chechnya. A roadside bomb hit near a ural truck with Russian soldiers in the Gubdenskiy region of Dagestan. Reportedly nobody suffered from the explosion. One and a half-hour later, militants attacked the vehicle with officers of the patrol- point-duty service in the town of Dagestanskiye Ogni, Dagestan. Again reportedly nobody was injured.
- June 22 – Four federal officers and two civilians were injured, when militants fired an apartment building in the city of Tyrnyauz, Kabardino-Balkaria. One MVD serviceman from Adygea was killed, when armed fighters from inside a vehicle fired upon a column of five motor vehicles containing servicemen from Adygea, in the village of Mekenskaya, Chechnya. Five minutes later one FSB officer was wounded, when fighters attacked FSB officers in the village of Petropavlovsk, in the suburb of Grozny, Chechnya.
- June 23 – Three rebels were reportedly killed in the village of Makhkety in the Vedeno district of Chechnya according to the FSB.

=== July ===
- July 2 – Kavkazcenter.com reported that an ambush on a Russian military vehicle killed 2 Russian troops and wounded 5 others. No casualties were incurred by the rebels. About 15 minutes, after the first attack the rebels opened fire on a patrol of local Chechen security forces seriously wounding 2.
- July 5 – Russian security forces reported 1 police officer was killed and 5 were wounded by rebel action in the republics of Dagestan and Ingushetia. One officer was killed while another was wounded by grenade fire in Ingushetia; one officer was wounded by gunfire in Ingushetia and Dagestan's Interior Ministry reported 3 policemen were wounded, when a bomb went off near their vehicle in the town of Khasavyurt, Dagestan.
- July 6 – A seven-hour shootout between Russian soldiers and suspected rebels holed up in a house in the republic of Ingushetia left two dead on each side, the Russian Interior Ministry reported.
- July 8 – A Russian policeman was killed and another was wounded in a gunfight with suspected rebels in the Chechen capital Grozny, police said. Three policemen were shot and killed early on Tuesday in Baksan, a small town in Russia's North Caucasus region of Kabardino-Balkaria, news agency Interfax said quoting local law enforcement.
- July 9–15 rebels killed 3 men linked to the security forces in the village of Muzhichy, which nestles in the foothills of the Caucasus mountains in southern Ingushetia, next to Chechnya.
- July 12 – 1 Chechen security official died and 2 other Chechen troops were wounded by an IED set off near their military convoy in the village of Belgatoi, Chechnya. Also another serviceman was injured in an explosion by a booby-trap in the forest, near the village of Khatun, the Vedeno district.
- July 13 – Rebels killed two policemen as they guarded a scientific research station in a remote village in the Caucasus mountains of Kabardino-Balkaria.
- July 14 – Sources in Chechen President Kadyrov's inner circle reported that the brother of Chechen Rebel leader Dokka Umarov, Ahmad Umarov, escaped from President Ramzan Kadyrov's prison, after turning himself in 2 years previously under an amnesty deal. A massive manhunt was launched in the surrounding villages and forest. So far whereabouts of Ahmad Umarov are unknown though one theory is he is going to join the rebels and his brother. Also 2 police officers were injured, when rebels attacked them in a drive-by shooting in Russia's North Caucasus Republic of Chechnya, a police source reported.
- July 15 – 9 Russian soldiers were killed and 4 injured by an explosion in an ammunition depot in the southern Chechnya. Rebels in Ingushetia killed Akhmet Murazbekov former police chief of a small village in Ingushetia near the capital Magas. Also in Dagestan Russian Police killed 1 rebel who threw a grenade at their checkpoint.
- July 16 – A policeman was killed and 4 policemen were injured in the blast and a shootout in Chechnya, a source in the Chechen law enforcement reported.
- July 20 – 3 Chechen police officers guarding an Interior Ministry trailer were killed by rebels.
- July 21 – Rebels armed with heavy machine guns and grenade launchers attacked a convoy of Interior Ministry troops in the Nazran region of Ingushetia, wounding five soldiers, police investigators reported.
- July 24 – Rebels fired a rocket propelled grenade at the house of Malgobek criminal investigations department chief, Isa Korigov, in Ingushetia. Nobody was injured in the initial attack but, when police officers approached an IED went off severely wounding 7 police officers, including Isa Korigov.
- July 30 – Rebels killed a Russian Interior Troop and three others were injured in a clash with a group of gunmen in Chechnya. Also a car bomb exploded outside the regional police headquarters in Ingushetia, killing at least two police officers.

=== August ===
- August 1 – In the Republic of Ingushetia, a soldier for the Russian Interior Ministry was killed and another wounded during a raid on a house, in which a gun battle ensued.
- August 2 – One police officer was killed and another wounded, when their patrol car came under attack nearby the city of Nazran, Ingushetia.
- August 13 – A car with FSB personnel was attacked, whilst travelling on a Federal Highway in the Gudermessky District of Chechnya. The attackers, wielding automatic weapons, fired from a moving car in oncoming traffic. One agent was wounded in the attack.
- August 15 – 2 police officers were killed and a further two wounded in separate attacks in Chechnya. Both attacks were perpetrated with small arms.
- August 19 – 2 Russian soldiers were killed and another injured in a gunfight and IED attack by Chechen rebels in the village of Niki-Khita, southeast of Grozny.
- August 22 – A pickup truck hauling fireworks and escorted by a police vehicle came under attack on a Federal Highway in Ingushetia. The passenger of the truck was killed and several others, including the police officers in the accompanying vehicle, were injured, when the gunfire caused the fireworks to explode. Elsewhere in Ingushetia, explosions were reported in the village of Malgobek, but without casualty.
- August 24 – A Russian armored vehicle was struck by explosives and gunfire, while on patrol near the village of Agishty in Chechnya. Two officers were killed and a further two were wounded in the attack.
- August 25 – One police officer was killed and another wounded, when three men riding in a car opened fire on the policemen with pistols, after being stopped for a routine document check in Urus-Martan, Chechnya.
- August 30 – 2 Russian soldiers were killed and 11 were wounded, when two suicide bombers rammed a jeep packed with explosives into a Russian military camp in Vedeno. Another Russian soldier died in an IED attack in the village of Serzhen-Yurt during patrols. Also two senior Russian officers were killed and 6 were seriously wounded in an ambush on their convoy. 2 more Russian police officers were shot dead at a checkpoint in Kabardino-Balkaria, when unknown assailants opened fire with automatic weapons from a forested area.

=== September ===
- September 1 – Two police officers were killed and another wounded, when militants opened fire on a police station early in the morning in the village of Achaluki, Ingushetia.
- September 4 – Five rebels were killed in Khasavyurt, Dagestan when the former brick factory they were hiding in was raided by agents from the Russian Federal Security Service. Two agents were wounded and one civilian was killed in the operation.
- September 7 – 6 rebels were killed and 2 police officers were wounded in a shootout with police in Nazran, Ingushetia.
- September 8 – In Dagestan Abdul Madzhid and 2 rebels were killed along with 10 Russian special commandos in a firefight in southern Dagestan. 3 Russian troops were killed in a gunfight with rebels in Dagestan during an operation targeting rebels in the mountains. Elsewhere in Dagestan, 3 rebels were killed when Russian troops tried to stop their vehicle at a checkpoint. According to the Interior Ministry one of the dead was Ilgar Malachiyev, a suspected separatist leader. 2 more Dagestani police officers were killed in an unidentified location when their vehicle was ambushed by unknown assailants. In Chechnya, 7 police officers were wounded after an IED exploded near their convoy.
- September 9 – 2 Chechen policemen were severely wounded when a roadside bomb went off near their vehicle in Benoi.
- September 10 – Rebels killed the cousin of Ingushetian President Murat Zyazikov in Nazran and rebels also killed 2 Dagestani policemen drive-by shooting.
- September 13 – Two policemen were killed when an unknown assailant opened fire on them before fleeing.
- September 15 – Ingush police commandos raided a house in Nazran, Ingushetia causing a gunfight that left 4 commandos killed, 8 wounded and 2 rebels killed.
- September 16 – In the Ingush village of Verkhniye Achaluki, Russian security forces launched an attack on rebels leaving 4 Russian troops and 3 rebels dead. A 10 kilogram explosive device was destroyed with a controlled explosion in the Dagestani capital of Makhachkala.
- September 17 – 10 rebels and 1 FSB agent were killed in a gunbattle in southern Dagestan. An ambush on the Galashki-Datykh highway in Ingushetia targeting a Ural truck left 4 Interior Ministry troops dead.
- September 18 – In Grozny, Chechnya one member of the Zapad Battalion was killed and a further two injured when their vehicle was attacked by small arms fire. Rebels in Makhachkala, Dagestan seriously wounded five Russian police officers when they launched an overnight attack on a police outpost.
- September 19 – Renat Ismailov, a militant on the Russian federal wanted list, was killed during a shootout with police in the Dagestani capital of Makhachkala.
- September 23 – In Nazran, Ingushetia 2 Russian Interior Ministry were wounded in a rocket propelled grenade attack. Additionally in Grozny, a car bomb was disarmed by FSB agents before it could be detonated.
- September 30 – A car bomb targeted Ingushetia Interior Minister Medov in an assassination attempt. Medov was unhurt but 2 bodyguards were wounded.

=== October ===
- October 1 – In Vladikavkaz, the director of the North Ossetian criminal investigation department was assassinated, along with his son, when unknown assailants ambushed the car they were travelling in.
- October 3 – One Russian soldier was killed in the Shalinsky District of Chechnya when rebels opened fire on his car in the early morning. The rebels were able to make off with a small arms cache and a grenade launcher from the dead soldier's car.
- October 7 – 2 militants were killed in Kabardino-Balkaria when the car they were travelling in was stopped by police. The two men, armed with Kalashnikov rifles, opened fire on the police who subsequently shot the men dead.
- October 21 – Rebels ambushed a Russian police truck in Dagestan killing 5 and wounding 9 others.
- October 24 – 15 people were seized as hostages by militants from a slot arcade in the Sunzhensky District of Ingushetia. Three of the hostages were police officers in Chechnya and one other hostage was an Ingush police officer. In neighboring Chechnya, a series of three separate bomb blasts caused eleven casualties. The first, an IED attack, killed one soldier and wounded two more. The second, another IED attack, injured one police officer responding to a house fire. 7 FSB agents investigating this attack were wounded when a third bomb went off.
- October 28 – Three militants were killed in the Chechen capital of Grozny during a special operation conducted by the FSB and local police.

=== November ===
- November 2–7 Ingush police officers were injured when an IED blew near the car they were investigating.
- November 10 – In Karabulak, Ingushetia a car bomb went off near an Ingush Police Headquarters killing 10. Also in Grozny, Chechen rebels attacked a police station killing 1 police officer and wounding 4 others.

=== December ===
- December 28 – Russian military forces attacked a rebel camp in the Sunzha District of Ingushetia killing 12 rebels.
- December 29 – Major General Valery Lipinsky, deputy commander of the North Caucasus arm of Russia's Interior Ministry forces was shot and killed by rebels in Makhachkala, Dagestan.
