= Marilene Felinto =

Marilene Felinto Barbosa de Lima (born 1957) is a Brazilian journalist and writer.

== Life and career ==
Born in Recife, Pernambuco, in 1968 she moved to São Paulo with her family. She graduated in Letters (Portuguese-English) from the Faculty of Philosophy, Letters and Human Sciences at the University of São Paulo in 1981. She is also a translator having translated to Portuguese works by authors such as Joseph Conrad, Edgar Allan Poe, Thomas Wolfe, and John Fante

Felinto received the Jabuti Award in the Newcomer Author category in 1983. She taught a short course on Brazilian literature at the University of California at Berkeley in 1992, in addition to having participated in a cultural circuit of Brazilian literature at Haus Der Kulturen der Welt (Germany) in 1994 and the Paris Book Fair in honor of Brazil in 1998, at the invitation of the French Ministry of Culture.

She entered journalism in 1989 and was a columnist for Folha de S. Paulo and Caros Amigos. Felinto is currently a columnist for Revista Gama, on the UOL website. She writes about politics, feminism, racism and social issues. Felinto obtained her master's degree in Clinical Psychology from the Pontifical Catholic University of São Paulo in 2019, with the dissertation "Autobiography of a Fiction Writing", under the supervision of Peter Pál Pelbart.

== Works ==
=== Novels ===
- 2002: Obsceno abandono: amor e perda (Record)
- 1987: O lago encantado de Grongonzo (Guanabara)
- 1982: As Mulheres de Tijucopapo (Paz e Terra, 34, Ubu)
  - English version: The Women of Tijucopapo (translation and foreword by Irene Matthews; University of Nebraska Press, 1994).

=== Crônicas ===
- 2000: Jornalisticamente incorreto (Record)

=== Short stories ===
- 2022: Mulher feita e outros contos (Fósforo)
- 2019: Contos Reunidos (Edição da Autora)
- 2019: Sinfonia de contos da infância: para crianças e adultos (Edição da Autora)
- 1991: Postcard (Iluminuras)
