= Broadman =

Broadman may refer to:

== People with the surname Broadman ==
- Beverly Broadman, journalist
- Harry G. Broadman, businessman

== Other uses ==
- Broadman Press, a predecessor of B&H Publishing Group
