= Asesela Ravuvu =

Fijian academic and political leader

Asesela Ravuvu (10 May 1931 — 11 March 2008) was a Fijian academic and political leader. The Director of Pacific Studies at the University of the South Pacific, Professor Ravuvu was appointed to the Fijian Senate by the Great Council of Chiefs in 2001, to one of the 14 Senate seats (out of 32 in total) allocated to the Great Council. As of September 2005, he held the position of Leader of the House in the Senate, but retired from this body in 2006.

He was from the Province of Naitasiri and was born and brought up in the highlands of Viti Levu in the village of Nakorosule. He deemed himself a "Kai-Colo" meaning from the highlands and remained a true Fijian at heart.

== Attitudes towards Fiji's chiefly system ==
During the Fiji coup of 2000, Ravuvu told Pacific Journalism Online on 28 May 2000 that most chiefs had lost the power to influence their own people. Traditionally, he said, chiefs had been selected on merit and could be overthrown if they failed to perform up to the expectations of their people. Colonial rule from 1874 onwards, however, had seen the British rulers establish an elite group of chiefs who supported their interests. This had led to a system that became "increasingly hereditary and difficult to change," which in turn had ultimately resulted in a loss of chiefly power. "(When) the people of the land no longer have the power to select and install their leaders, the chiefs lose their mana or power," he said. This he blamed for the actions of rebel leader George Speight, who led the putsch against the elected government of Prime Minister Mahendra Chaudhry and called for the resignation of the President, Ratu Sir Kamisese Mara, the Paramount Chief of the Lau Islands.

When the common people became better educated, Ravuvu said, chiefs felt their hold on the community to be under threat. To reinforce their authority, many chiefs reacted by emphasizing traditional values, particularly those that reinforced the status quo. Many of these "traditions," according to Ravuvu, were in fact colonial legacies and constructions that had been relabelled as indigenous traditions. He called for a democratizing of the chiefly system. "It is high time that the people are given back the flexibility and power to select and install their leaders who will be accountable to them if they are to prosper and forge ahead in the present modern and increasingly global context," he declared.

== Calls for political and judicial reform ==
On 29 August 2005, Ravuvu said that discussions on major issues like land reform and politics were being hampered by the way parliament had become too politicized. He said it would be more constructive to hold a summit of leaders, with input from the Great Council of Chiefs and from the private sector, to discuss national issues in a more informal setting.

Ravuvu also called for the judicial system to be reorganized. The existing system of using trial assessors was not conducive to justice and fairness, he considered, and the former jury system should be reinstated. He called for the English judicial model to be scrapped in favour of the American one.

== Career ==
Ravuvu worked with the Fiji Ministry of Education for 24 years. In 1963 he was the recipient of the United States Government "Fulbright" Scholarship to study in the United States of America with a focus on elementary education system.

He was a polling Officer in Fiji's first general election in 1968 and saw at first hand the consternation and fear of the indigenous Fijians when they first went to the poll.

In the early 1970s he joined Nasinu Teachers Training College as a Lecturer. During his tenure he was also appointed Vice Principal.

He joined the United States Peace Corps Fiji Office for two years before joining the University of the South Pacific as a Lecturer.

Ravuvu was one of the first graduates of the University of The South Pacific in 1970 with a Bachelor of Arts Degree in Education. He received his Doctor of Philosophy (PhD) in anthropology from the University of Auckland, with a thesis on Fijian ceremonies.

Ravuvu was appointed Professor of Pacific Studies at the USP in the wake of the Fiji coups of 1987. Prior to his professorship, he was also holding the appointment of the Director of Pacific Studies at the University of the South Pacific. During this time he had published some of his writings, The Fijian Way of Life 1976, The Fijian Ethos 1987, Development or Dependence 1988, The Facade of Democracy 1991. His last book, Façade of Democracy, published in 1991, argued for "a degree of political paramountcy" in order to allow all races to live together peacefully. He also wrote that "Fijians generally perceive Indians as mean and stingy, crafty and demanding to the extent of being considered greedy, inconsiderate and grasping, uncooperative, egotistic, and calculating. Indians on the other hand, view Fijians as "jungalis" or bushwhackers, still behind the times and backward, naive and foolish, and generally poor. They are seen as lazy, proud and extravagant, pound-foolish and undependable. These perceptions of each other are nearly always subdued and latent yet only need some slight provocations to bring them to the fore, which at times culminates in open physical confrontations."

In the 1999 parliamentary election, Ravuvu was an unsuccessful candidate for the Christian Democratic Alliance.

Following the 2000 coup, the interim government of Prime Minister Laisenia Qarase named Ravuvu to head a Commission to rewrite the 1997 Constitution, which Fijian ethno-nationalists criticized as giving too many concessions to the Indo-Fijian community. On 15 November 2000, however, the High Court reinstated the suspended Constitution, a decision upheld by the Court of Appeal on 1 March 2001. Between the High Court decision and the appeal, the Commission continued to function. Ravuvu defended this by saying on 20 November that politics must come before law and legalities, a comment that sparked considerable public outrage.'

Ravuvu was first married to Paulini Kinisimere, who hailed from Bua) and with whom he had six daughters and one son - Vuki, Amelia, Lusi, Josese, Merewalesi, Makelesi and Evisake. He had no children with his second wife, Makitalena Waqa, who hailed from Naisogovau, Dravo, Tailevu.

== Awards ==
In July 1992, Ravuvu was the inaugural recipient of the Nayacakalou Medal, conferred by the Polynesian Society of the University of Auckland.
