= Gadzhi Navruzov =

Russian footballer

Personal information
- Full name: Gadzhi Nadirovich Navruzov
- Date of birth: 11 April 1989 (age 37)
- Height: 1.89 m (6 ft 2 1/2 in)
- Position: Defender

Senior career*
Years	Team	Apps	(Gls)
2009	FC Sportakademklub Moscow	22	(0)
2010	FC SKA-Energiya Khabarovsk	21	(0)
2011	FC SKA-Energiya Khabarovsk	0	(0)
2013	FC Sportakademklub Moscow (amateur)		
2013–2014	FC Volga Tver	20	(0)
- * Club domestic league appearances and goals

Gadzhi Nadirovich Navruzov (Russian: Гаджи Надирович Наврузов; born 11 April 1989) is a former Russian professional football player. Currently he is a professional fighter, competing in multiple disciplines.

== Club career ==
He played in the Russian Football National League for FC SKA-Energiya Khabarovsk in 2010.

== Fighting career ==
After his footballing career Navruzov went on to become a fighter, earning himself the nickname "Assault Rifle" or "Machine Gun".

He made his fighting debut in 2012, while also still playing football. In March 2018 he became world champion Thai boxing. In March 2021 news agency Reuters ran a story on bareknuckle fighting in Russia which featured Navruzov.

According to fighting statistics website Tapology as of March 2023 Navruzov has a pro boxing record of 2-1-0.
