= Gadzhi-Eynali =

- Location within Azerbaijan
- Coordinates: 39°05′N 48°48′E
- Country: Azerbaijan
- Rayon: Masally
- Time zone: UTC+4 (AZT)
  - Summer (DST): UTC+5 (AZT)

Gadzhi-Eynali is a village in the Masally Rayon of Azerbaijan.
