= Sérgio de Souza =

Brazilian journalist and writer

Sérgio de Souza (1934 – March 25, 2008) was a Brazilian journalist and writer. Born in Bom Retiro, São Paulo, De Souza co-founded the Caros Amigos, a left leaning, monthly Brazilian political magazine, and served as its editor.

Sérgio de Souza died of a respiratory illness on March 25, 2008, at the age of 73.
