= Terry Moloney (hurler) =

Irish hurler

Personal information
- Native name: Toirleach Ó Maoldomhnaigh (Irish)
- Born: 1939 County Tipperary, Ireland
- Died: 13 March 2008 (aged 68) London, England

Sport
- Sport: Hurling
- Position: Goalkeeper
Club
- Years: Club
- Arravale Rovers
Club titles
- Tipperary titles: 0
Inter-county
Years	County	Apps (scores)
1958-1961	Tipperary	6 (0-00)
Inter-county titles
- Munster titles: 1
- All-Irelands: 0
- NHL: 2

Terence Moloney (1939 - 13 March 2008) was an Irish hurler who played as a goalkeeper for the Tipperary senior team.

Born in County Tipperary, Moloney first played competitive hurling during his schooling at the Abbey CBS and St. Flannan's College. He arrived on the inter-county scene at the age of seventeen when he first linked up with the Tipperary minor team, before later joining the intermediate side. He joined the senior panel during the 1958 championship. Moloney later became a regular member of the starting fifteen, and won one Munster medal and two National Hurling League medals. He was an All-Ireland runner-up on one occasion.

At club level Moloney played both hurling and Gaelic football with Arravale Rovers.

Throughout his career Moloney made 6 championship appearances. He retired from senior inter-county hurling following the conclusion of the 1961 championship.
