= Harry G. Broadman =

American executive (born 1954)

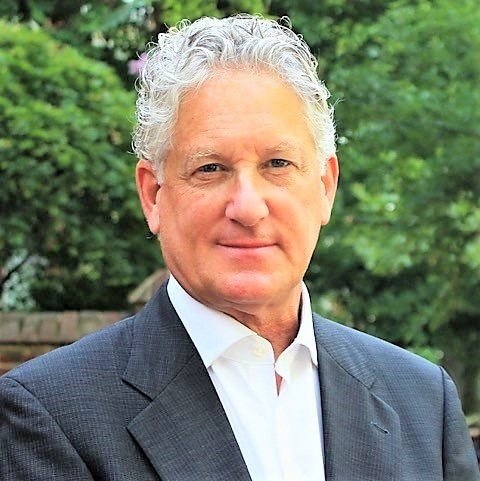
- Born: Harry G. Broadman; December 23, 1954 (age 71); New York City, NY, United States
- Education: Brown University (1977) and The University of Michigan (1981)
- Occupations: International Investment Executive and Global Business Strategist; Authority on Trade, Antitrust, Corporate Governance, Sustainability, and Innovation; Independent Corporate Director
- Website: harrygbroadman.com

Harry Gerard Broadman (born December 23, 1954, in New York City) is an international investment executive and global business strategist; an authority on trade, antitrust, corporate governance, sustainability, and innovation; and a non-executive corporate director. He is a Partner, managing director, and Chair of the Emerging Markets Practice and Chair of the Committee on Foreign Investment in the United States (CFIUS) Practice at the Berkeley Research Group LLC and on the faculty of Johns Hopkins University.

== Early life ==
Broadman was born in New York City, attended The Loomis Chaffee School, and graduated from Brown University in 1977 with an A.B. magna cum laude in economics and history. He was elected to Phi Beta Kappa in 1977. In 1978 he received his Master of Arts in economics, and in 1981 his Ph.D. in economics from The University of Michigan.

== Career ==
Broadman served as a consultant on energy security at the Rand Corporation in 1979 and from 1980 to 1981 he was a research fellow at the Brookings Institution.

He became a fellow and assistant director of the Center for Energy Policy Research at Resources for the Future (RFF) in 1981, where he worked on measuring the social costs of fossil fuels, U.S. oil import policy, regulatory reform of the natural gas industry, and oil exploration and development in non-OPEC developing countries.

Broadman joined the Harvard University faculty in 1984 with three different appointments. In Harvard's Faculty of Arts and Sciences Economics Department he taught international business investment. As a faculty member of Harvard's Kennedy School he taught energy economics and policy. He was also a faculty fellow at Harvard's Energy and Environmental Policy Center. While at Harvard he co-authored an article arguing for placing a $10.00 tariff on imported oil to curb U.S. petroleum consumption in order to reduce the social costs to the U.S. from the exposure of the national economy to external disturbances in the world oil market.

He served as the Chief Economist of the US Senate Committee on Governmental Affairs, then chaired by Senator John Glenn beginning in 1987, and in 1990, Broadman joined the administration of President George H. W. Bush to become Chief of Staff of the President's Council of Economic Advisers.

Subsequently, and continuing into the administration of Bill Clinton, Broadman was appointed as United States Assistant Trade Representative, with responsibility for overseeing the US government's negotiations of bilateral investment treaties (BITs) with foreign governments as well as its negotiations of the General Agreement on Trade in Services as part of the Uruguay Round multilateral trade agreement that established the WTO. He also led the negotiations of the foreign investment provisions of the North America Free Trade Agreement (NAFTA). He represented the US Trade Representative on the board of the Overseas Private Investment Corporation (OPIC) and on the inter-agency Committee on Foreign Investment in the United States (CFIUS).

From 1993 to 2008, he held several positions in the World Bank, where he managed the bank's loan operations and economic policy reform programs in China, especially on restructuring the country's industrial state owned enterprises and its shift towards a market-oriented economy; in The Russian Federation and other countries within the Commonwealth of Independent States (CIS), advising the authorities on the design and operation of their privatization, competition policy, corporate governance and trade and foreign investment programs; the Balkans; and sub-Saharan Africa.

In 2005 the World Bank published his book, From Disintegration to Reintegration: Eastern Europe and The Former Soviet Union in International Trade, and in 2007 the World Bank published his book, Africa's Silk Road: China's and India's New Economic Frontier.

Broadman joined former US Secretary of State Madeleine Albright’s consultancy, The Albright Group, as managing director in 2008 at the same time former German Vice Chancellor Joschka Fischer joined the firm. Concurrently Broadman joined Albright Capital Management LLC, an alternative investment and private equity fund focused exclusively on emerging markets.

In 2011, he was appointed Senior Managing Director at PricewaterhouseCoopers (PwC) to establish and lead PwC's Emerging Markets Business Growth Strategy Management Consulting Practice and serve as PwC's Chief Economist.

He became CEO and Managing Partner of Proa Global Partners LLC in 2015 and also joined the Johns Hopkins University faculty that year. In 2019 he joined the Berkeley Research Group LLC.
