= Peter Pál Pelbart =

Hungarian-born Brazilian philosopher and essayist

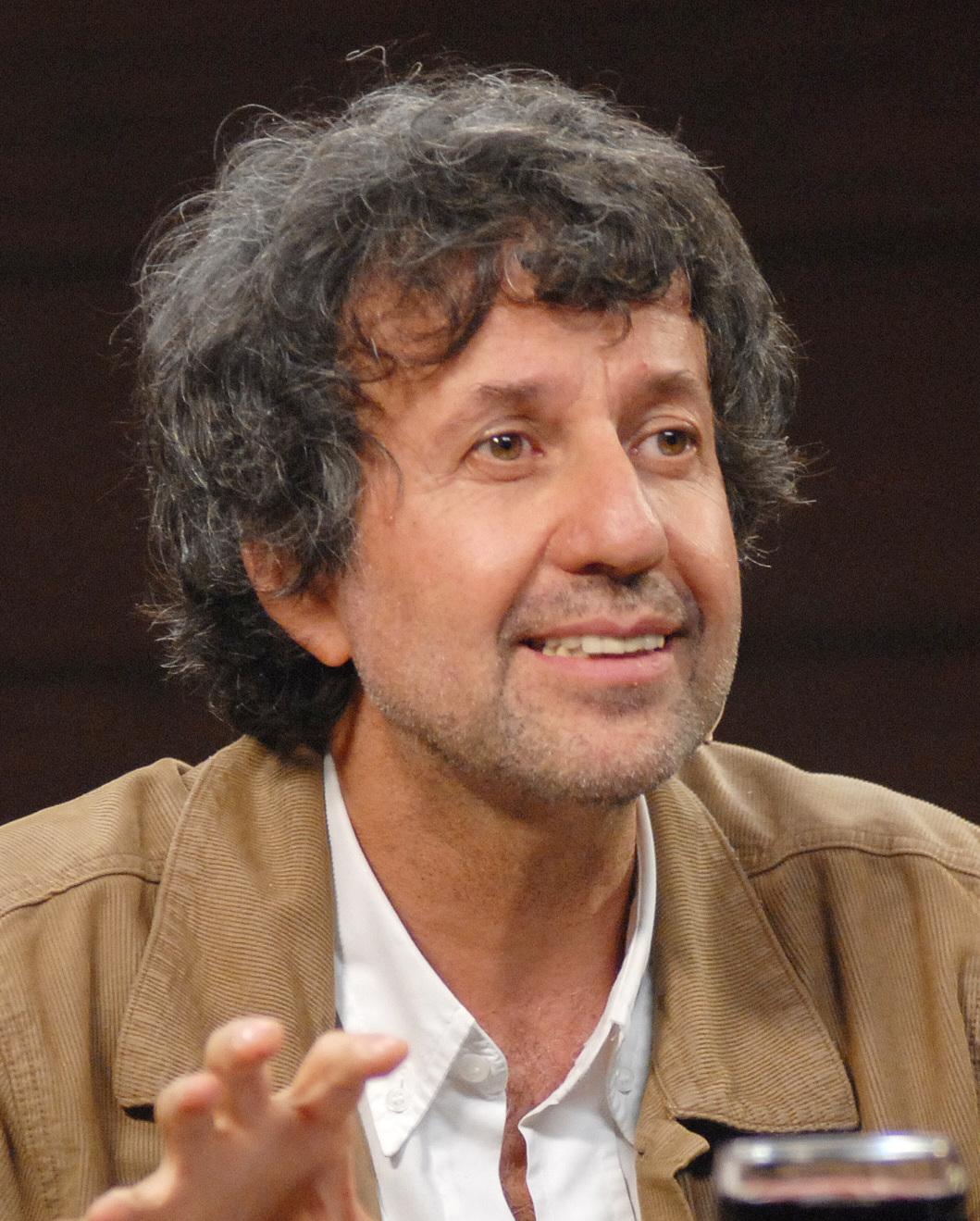
- Pelbart in 2008
- Born: 1956 (age 69–70); Budapest, Hungary

Education
- Education: University of the Sorbonne

Philosophical work
- School: Deleuzian
- Institutions: Pontifical Catholic University of São Paulo

Peter Pál Pelbart (born 1956) is a Hungarian-born Brazilian philosopher and essayist. He is a professor of philosophy at the Pontifical Catholic University of São Paulo and an essayist of Deleuzian orientation.

== Life ==
Born in Budapest in 1956, Peter Pál Pelbart moved with his family to Brazil as a child. He trained in philosophy at the University of the Sorbonne and then returned to São Paulo.

The themes of his books revolve around the question of time (the image of time in Gilles Deleuze: O tempo não-reconcilado ), schizophrenia (the relationship between philosophy and madness : Da clausura do fora ao fora da clausura ) and of biopolitics.

He animates and coordinates the Ueinzz theater company made up of psychiatric patients.

From his two experiences, philosophical and schizo-analytical, he theorizes contemporary subjectivities, in particular those ranging from exhaustion to nihilism. He is a member, with Suely Rolnik, of the Center for Research on Subjectivity.

== Selected works ==
- (pt) Da clausura do fora ao fora da clausura, Brasiliense, 1989
- (pt) In Nau do tempo-rei, Imago, 1994
- (pt) O tempo não-reconcilado, Perspectiva, 1998
- (pt) A Vertigem por um fio: políticas da subjetividade contemporânea, Iluminuras, 2000, 222 p.
- (pt) Vida Capital: ensaios de biopolítica, Iluminuras, 2003, 252 p.
- (es) Filosofia de la Desercion: Niilismo, Locura y Comunidad, Tinta Limon, 2009
