= Varvara Seminnikova =

Russian longevity claimant (1890–2008)

- Born: Varvara Konstantinovna Dyakonova; 10 May 1890 (claimed); Zhigansk, Zhigansky District, Sakha Republic, Russia
- Died: 9 March 2008 (aged 117); Saskylakh, Anabarsky District, Sakha Republic, Russia
- Spouse: Alexei Semennikov
- Parents: Konstantin Stefanov-Dyakonov (father); Maria Konstantinovna Dyakonova (mother)

Varvara Konstantinovna Semennikova (née Dyakonova; 10 May 1890 – 9 March 2008) She was a Russian Evenki longevity claimant who asserted that she was the oldest person in the world from August 2006, following the death of María Esther de Capovilla. However, her age was not internationally verified by any source, including Guinness World Records or the Gerontology Research Group.

== Biography ==
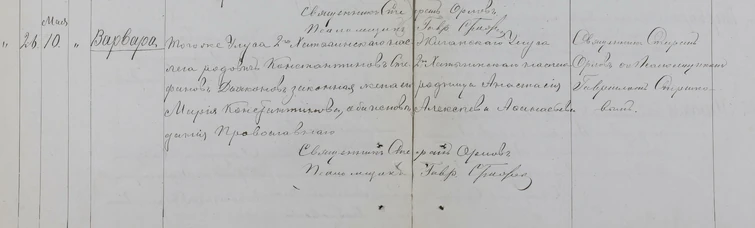
Birth record of Varvara Konstantinovna Dyakonova

Varvara Seminnikova was born on 10 May 1890, to Konstantin Stefanov-Dyakonov and his wife, Maria Konstantinovna. "The 1890 register of the Bulun Spasskaya Church (under the Yakutsk Ecclesiastical Consistory) contains an entry recording the birth on May 10 of Varvara, daughter of Konstantin Stefanovich Dyakonov, a member of the 2nd Khatygin Nasleg in the Zhigansk Ulus, and his lawful wife, Maria Konstantinovna. The sacrament of baptism was administered on November 8 of that same year by Priest Stefan Orlov, with Anastasia Alekseevna Afanasyeva, a fellow member of the same nasleg in the Zhigansk Ulus, serving as godmother."

In 1944, she married Alexei Semennikov, a hunter 27 years her junior. It was one of two of her marriages from which she had two children who died in their youth. At the age of 58, she adopted an 8-month-old girl, from which she had several grandchildren and great-grandchildren.

Semennikova smoked until she was 100 and, once she became a celebrity of sorts, received numerous awards, including a necklace of diamonds. In October 2007, it was reported that she was living with her 59-year-old adopted daughter Elena and 17-year-old grandson and it was also reported she had four children and 10 grandchildren.

Varvara Semennikova died in Saskylakh, Anabarsky District, Sakha Republic, Russia on 9 March 2008, at the claimed age of 117 years, 304 days. If this claim were verified, she would have been the oldest living person, as well as the fifth-oldest person in history. The only agency that has agreed with her age is the National Archive of Yakutia, who verified her as having been born in 1890 based on archived church records. The Gerontology Research Group possesses a church record for her dated 8 November 1890, made by the priest Stefan Orlov; however, as no other records, such as a marriage record, have been found, they have not confirmed her age.

The records found included a church record (1890), a marriage record extract (1944), as well as an identity document issued in the early 2000s.
