= Kurt Eberling Sr. =

Inventor of SpaghettiOs

Kurt Eberling Sr. (17 June 1930 – 6 March 2008) was a German-American chef and the inventor of SpaghettiOs.

Born in Aachen, Germany, Eberling immigrated to the United States in 1951, first working at a tavern in Philadelphia where he learned to cook. Eberling served with the army in Germany and Austria during the Korean War, and met his wife during this time. After the war Eberling went to work in the kitchens of the research and development department at Campbell's, where he developed products for the US and international markets. Eberling created the idea of canned "spaghetti and meatballs" when he saw a strand of spaghetti curled up in the sink. He took the idea to his supervisor, Heinz Fisher, and Ralph Miller. When they brought it to Campbell president William Beverly Murphy, he recommended switching to the Campbell spaghetti sauce, which they did. The product then went to marketing and Donald Goerke. Goerke's role as the face of the products development resulted in his being most often called the "father of Spaghetti-Os".

Eberling died of cancer on 6 March 2008.
