= Henri Blaffart =

Belgian conservationist, environmentalist (1965 – 2008)

Henri Blaffart (22 June 1965 – 21 March 2008) was a Belgian conservationist and environmentalist.

== Biography ==
Henri Blaffart graduated from the Faculty of Agronomic Science of Gembloux in Belgium in 1990 with a degree in agronomy, with an emphasis on forests and water. Blaffart began working on various conservation projects throughout the world following his graduation, including Ethiopia, Cambodia, Samoa and Papua New Guinea before moving to New Caledonia.

Blaffart began working on a Conservation International project, the Mont Panié Special Botanical Reserve project in New Caledonia, in 2002. He officially joined Conservation International in 2006 as the Mont Panié project chief. Blaffart worked with the Kanak communities on the environmental management of Mont Panié, which is located in New Caledonia's North Province. He actively worked with a number of New Caledonian organizations to protect the Mont Panié reserve, including the government of North Province, the Dayu Biik Association, which comprises local Kanak tribes, the Caledonian Institute of Agronomy and other scientific, social and governmental organizations.

Henri Blaffart was swept away and accidentally drowned while trying to cross the Tiendanite River in North Province on 21 March 2008. He was 42 years old and was survived by his mother and sister, who both reside in Belgium.
