= Lynne Golding-Kirk =

Australian ballet dancer

Lynne Golding-Kirk (13 April 1920 – 21 March 2008) was an Australian prima ballerina.

Golding-Kirk was born Lynne Golding in Paddington, New South Wales, lived in Marrickville and attended Sydney Girls High School. At age 15 she left school to devote herself exclusively to ballet. She became the prima ballerina for the Tivoli circuit, performing two shows each day. In 1951 she was selected for Melbourne's National Theatre Ballet and danced the dual role of Odette/Odile in Swan Lake.

Golding went on to perform in Europe and South America. Moving to New York to study and teach, she met dancer Alan Hope Kirk; they married in 1958 and subsequently performed together.

Returning to Australia in 1965, Golding-Kirk opened her own studio. She retired in 2000.
