= Beverly Broadman =

American journalist

Beverly Broadman (c. 1948 – March 27, 2008) was an American journalist who was one of the original reporters for CNN. She joined CNN in 1980, just a month before CNN's first broadcast on the air.

== Career ==
Broadman began her career CNN at CNN Sports, but later held a variety of positions at the cable news network. She was promoted to a news manager at CNN's domestic assignment desk. Broadman had been working at as editor at the network's news planning desk in the recent years before her death. She covered major world events for CNN, including the 1986 Space Shuttle Challenger explosion and the September 11 terrorist attacks in 2001. Broadman was a 1972 graduate of the City University of New York with a Masters in Speech and Theater/Communications.

Beverly Broadman, who was known as Bev, died on March 27, 2008, of cancer at the age of 60. CNN President Jim Walton sent a memo to CNN staffers saying: "There is no way I can capture the importance of her contributions over 28 years, so I'll say simply this: Bev was a journalist, proud of our profession and proud to be part of CNN. We're better because of her."
