= Gadzhi Abashilov =

Russian journalist (1950–2008)

Gadzhi Akhmedovich Abashilov
- Born: 1950; Gunib district, Dagestan, USSR
- Died: 21 March 2008 (aged 58); Makhachkala, Dagestan, Russia
- Education: Dagestan State University
- Occupation: Journalist

Gadzhi Akhmedovich Abashilov (Russian: Гаджи Ахмедович Абашилов; 1950 – 21 March 2008), also known as Haji Abashilov, was a Russian journalist and chief of the Republic of Dagestan's outlet of state-owned VGTRK media company. He was assassinated in Makhachkala, Dagestan on 21 March 2008 at 19:45 local time.

== Early life and education ==
Gadzhi Abashilov was born in the Gunib district of Dagestan in 1950. He graduated from Dagestan State University after studying at the foreign languages faculty.

== Career ==
From 1975 to 1991, Abashilov was employed in local Komsomol structures, and in late 1980s he led Dagestani VLKSM Committee. From 1991 to 2006, Abashilov was chief editor of "Molodezh' Dagestana" (Молодежь Дагестана, Youths of Dagestan). In 1999, he was elected a member of local legislature, then was appointed deputy head of republican ministry of information, national policy and external affairs. Abashilov also presented his own television programme until 2007. January 2007, he became chief of Dagestan State Television and Radio Broadcasting Company.

== Death ==
Gadzhi Abashilov was assassinated in the evening of 21 March 2008. His car was fired on in the central part of Makhachkala where Abashilov died at the scene and his driver was injured. In the early hours of the same day another Dagestani journalist, Ilyas Shurpayev, who had worked for years in the republic as a correspondent of NTV and Channel One, was found strangled in Moscow.

== Reactions ==
The Director-General of UNESCO, Koïchiro Matsuura, condemned both murders on 28 March 2008.
