= Caros Amigos =

Brazilian magazine

- Editor: Hamilton Octávio de Souza
- Categories: Politics, culture
- Frequency: Monthly
- Publisher: Editora Casa Amarela
- Total circulation: 48,000 (October 2007)
- First issue: April 1997
- Final issue: December 2017
- Country: Brazil
- Based in: São Paulo
- Language: Brazilian Portuguese
- Website: www.carosamigos.com.br

Caros Amigos (Portuguese: Dear friends) was a monthly alternative Brazilian magazine based in São Paulo.

== History and profile ==
Caros Amigos was established in April 1997 by a group of professionals, including journalists, publicists, writers and intellectuals. Sérgio de Souza, the co-founder and editor of the magazine, died on 25 March 2008. The magazine focuses on politics, social issues and culture from a left wing point of view.

Caros Amigos was published in São Paulo and distributed throughout the country by Editora Casa Amarela. The magazine features articles from a large spectrum of left-wing authors, such as José Arbex, and Frei Betto, which is now an objector of Lula.

In March 2013 eleven journalists of Caros Amigos were fired due to their protest over poor working conditions.

In December 2017 the magazine announced it would cease publishing its print edition, becoming a digital only magazine.

== Notable contributors ==
- Frei Betto
- Fidel Castro
- Ferréz
- Ana Miranda
- Eduardo Suplicy
- Edu Montesanti
