= Ilyas Shurpayev =

Russian journalist (1975–2008)

Ilyas Imranovich Shurpayev
- Born: July 25, 1975; Makhachkala, Dagestan,
- Died: March 21, 2008 (aged 32); Moscow
- Other names: Ильяс Имранович Шурпаев
- Occupation: Journalist
- Known for: Murdered in Moscow

Ilyas Imranovich Shurpayev (Russian: Ильяс Имранович Шурпаев; 25 July 1975, Makhachkala – 21 March 2008, Moscow) was a Russian television journalist and Channel One (Russia) correspondent.

== Life and career ==
Shurpayev was born in Makhachkala, Dagestan, and graduated from a local university with a specialization in philology. He worked for Channel One and mostly served in Russia's North Caucasus region, including Dagestan and Chechnya.

== Death ==
On 21 March 2008, Shurpayev was found dead in his apartment in Moscow with stab wounds and a belt around his neck. A fire was set in the apartment after the attack, and a sum of money was stolen. Hours before his death, Shurpayev wrote a blog post, entitled "Now I am a dissident!", saying that the owners of a Dagestan newspaper had banned his column and told its staff not to mention his name in publications.

The investigations committee of the Russian prosecutor's office opened a criminal case into the murder.

On the night he was murdered, he asked the concierge to admit two young men to his building, saying they were his guests. A week later it was reported that Shurpayev met them in a park known as a popular place for gay liaisons. The two suspects were Tajik, and one of them had served a term for robbery. Both men fled to Tajikistan.

On 30 July 2008, two Tajik citizens, 25-year-old Masrudzhon Yatimov and 21-year-old Nadzhmiddin Mukhiddinov, were found guilty of Shurpayev's murder by the Supreme Court of Tajikistan and sentenced to 21 years imprisonment each. Both admitted their guilt.
