= 2008 in film =

The year 2008 involved many major film events. The Dark Knight was the year's highest-grossing film, while Slumdog Millionaire won the Academy Award for Best Picture (out of eight Academy Awards).

== Evaluation of the year ==
2008 has been widely considered to be a very significant year for cinema.

The entertainment agency website IGN described 2008 as "one of the biggest years ever for movies." It stated, "2008 was the year when the comic book movie genre not only hits its zenith, but also gained critical respectability thanks to The Dark Knight. Animated films also proved a huge draw for filmgoers, with Pixar's WALL-E becoming not only the highest grossing toon but also the most lauded. Things got off on the right foot with the monster movie madness of Cloverfield. Marvel got down to business laying the groundwork for their superhero team-up The Avengers with the blockbuster hit Iron Man and their respectable attempt at rebooting The Incredible Hulk. The games-to-film genre took a hit this year, with only Max Payne proving to be a worthy adaptation of the source material. We also saw the highly anticipated big-screen returns of iconic characters like Batman, James Bond, and Indiana Jones – some were more successful than others."

The film industry and review website IndieWire described 2008 as "a stellar year for movies" that "gave us tons of unforgettable classics" such as The Wrestler, 4 Months, 3 Weeks and 2 Days and Che.

== Highest-grossing films ==
The top 10 films released in 2008 by worldwide gross are as follows:

Highest-grossing films of 2008
Rank	Title	Distributor	Worldwide gross
1	The Dark Knight	Warner Bros.	$997,000,000 (Note: Excludes grosses from subsequent re-releases.)
2	Indiana Jones and the Kingdom of the Crystal Skull	Paramount	$786,636,033
3	Kung Fu Panda	Paramount	$631,744,560
4	Hancock	Sony	$629,443,428
5	Mamma Mia!	Universal	$609,841,637
6	Madagascar: Escape 2 Africa	Paramount	$603,900,354
7	Quantum of Solace	Sony / MGM	$589,580,482
8	Iron Man	Paramount	$585,796,247
9	WALL-E	Disney	$521,311,860
10	The Chronicles of Narnia: Prince Caspian	Disney	$419,665,568

For 2008, the top ten films consisted of three superhero films, three animated films, three action films and one musical film.

=== Box office records ===
- In the domestic box office, 2008 came very close in passing 2007 as the highest-grossing year, falling short by just $30 million.
- On August 4, The Dark Knight reached a $400 million domestic gross in a record time of 18 days. The previous record was held by Shrek 2, which reached it in 43 days. On August 31, after 45 days in release, The Dark Knight reached $500 million domestically, becoming only the second film in history after Titanic to cross the half-billion-dollar domestic milestone, as well as the first film of the 2000s decade to cross that milestone. Worldwide, it grossed $997 million on its initial release, and an IMAX reissue in 2009 saw it become the fourth film to gross $1 billion at the global box office. It also surpassed Harry Potter and the Philosopher's Stone as the highest-grossing film ever distributed by Warner Bros. until it was surpassed by Harry Potter and the Deathly Hallows – Part 2 in 2011.
- Mamma Mia! became the highest-grossing film in UK history until it was surpassed by Avatar in 2010.
- Slumdog Millionaire set several records. At the worldwide box office, it became the most successful British independent film of all time. At the UK box office, it became the highest-grossing British independent film (surpassing Four Weddings and a Funeral), the highest-grossing British film without US studio investment, and the biggest ever weekly "increase for a UK saturation release" (surpassing Billy Elliot).

== Events ==
Month
Day
Event
January
7
Due to the 2007–2008 Writers Guild of America Strike, NBC and the Hollywood Foreign Press Association scrap plans to hold its 65th Golden Globe Awards ceremony and instead hold a press conference announcing the winners
13
The 65th Golden Globe Awards winners were announced.
16
The 61st BAFTA Awards nominations were announced with Atonement the leading film with 14 nominations closely followed by No Country for Old Men and There Will Be Blood, both with 7 nominations
17 – 27
The 26th Sundance Film Festival is opened with the world premiere of Martin McDonagh's In Bruges and screens over 120 films. The Grand Jury and Audience Award prizes are awarded to Frozen River and The Wackness, respectively. The festival is closed by the world premiere of Bernard Shakey's CSNY/Déjà Vu
22
The 80th Academy Awards nominations were announced with No Country for Old Men and There Will Be Blood the leading films with 8 nominations each, closely followed by Atonement and Michael Clayton, both with 7
The Oscar-nominated actor Heath Ledger, 28, is found dead at his home in Manhattan, New York City, from an accidental prescription pills overdose.
23 – 3
The 37th Rotterdam International Film Festival is opened with the world premiere of Lucía Cedrón's narrative feature-film debut Lamb of God (Cordero de Dios).
26
The 60th Directors Guild of America Award dinner is held in the Hyatt Regency Century Plaza, Los Angeles. The Outstanding Directorial Achievement in Feature Film prize is awarded to Joel and Ethan Coen
27
The 14th Screen Actors Guild Awards ceremony is held in the Shrine Exposition Center, Los Angeles.
February
7 – 17
The 58th Berlin International Film Festival is opened with the world premiere of Martin Scorsese's Shine a Light and screens over 350 films. The Golden Bear prize is awarded to Elite Squad. The Silver Bear prizes are awarded to Paul Thomas Anderson, Best Director, Reza Naji, Best Actor and Sally Hawkins, Best Actress. The festival is closed by the international premiere of Michel Gondry's Be Kind Rewind
8
The 35th Annie Awards ceremony is held in the UCLA's Royce Hall, Los Angeles. The Best Animated Feature prize is awarded to Ratatouille
9
The 60th Writers Guild of America Awards are announced in a brief statement. The Best Adapted Screenplay and Best Original Screenplay prizes are awarded to Joel and Ethan Coen (No Country for Old Men) and Diablo Cody (Juno), respectively
10
The 61st BAFTA Awards ceremony is held in the Royal Opera House, London. Anthony Hopkins is honoured with the Academy Fellowship.
12
The members of the WGA agree a three-year deal with the AMPTP and vote to end the 3-month 2007–2008 Writers Guild of America Strike
23
The 28th Golden Raspberry Awards ceremony is held in Santa Monica, California.
The 23rd Independent Spirit Awards ceremony is broadcast. The Best Film award is given to Juno. The Best Actor and Best Actress awards are given to Philip Seymour Hoffman and Elliot Page respectively
24
The 80th Academy Awards ceremony is held in the Kodak Theatre, Hollywood.
March
3
The 28th Genie Awards
9
The 13th Empire Awards is held in the Grosvenor House Hotel in London, England.
13 – 21
7th Tiburon International Film Festival
April
4 – 13
10th Sarasota Film Festival
23 – 4
7th Tribeca Film Festival
- 2008 Best Narrative Feature – Let the Right One In
- 2008 Best Documentary – Pray the Devil Back to Hell
24 – 8
51st San Francisco International Film Festival
May
14 – 25
Entre les murs wins the Palme d'Or while Gomorrah receives the Grand Prix at the Cannes Film Festival.
22 – 15
34th Seattle International Film Festival
26
Indiana Jones and the Kingdom of the Crystal Skull earns $126 million in the United States and Canada, becoming the highest-grossing debut of 2008 and the second-highest-grossing for a Memorial Day weekend debut behind Pirates of the Caribbean: At World's End.
June
1
The 2008 MTV Movie Awards winners were announced
A massive fire destroys portions of facilities at Universal Studios in Universal City near Los Angeles.
14 – 22
11th Shanghai International Film Festival
18
Iron Man becomes the first movie of 2008 to earn $300 million in the United States and Canada.
18 – 29
62nd Edinburgh International Film Festival. The festival launches a new sidebar celebrating the spirit of discovery, including selections Bigga than Ben, Blood Car, Crack Willow, Spike, Strange Girls, and The Third Pint.
July
17 – 26
8th Era New Horizons Film Festival
August
4
The Dark Knight reached $400 million in record time at 18 days. The previous record was held by Shrek 2, which reached it in 43 days.
6 – 16
61st Locarno International Film Festival
21 – 1
32nd Montreal World Film Festival
27 – 6
65th Venice International Film Festival
September
4 – 13
33rd Toronto International Film Festival
15 – 20
33rd Polish Film Festival in Gdynia
18 – 27
56th San Sebastián International Film Festival
23 – 30
6th Bangkok International Film Festival
October
1 – 12
16th Raindance Film Festival
15 – 30
52nd London Film Festival
18 – 26
21st Tokyo International Film Festival
November
18 – 28
32nd Cairo International Film Festival
December
5 – 14
10th Jakarta International Film Festival
4 – 14
23rd Mar del Plata International Film Festival

== Awards ==
Category/Organization	14th Critics' Choice Awards January 8, 2009	66th Golden Globe Awards January 11, 2009		Producers, Directors, Screen Actors, and Writers Guild Awards	62nd BAFTA Awards February 8, 2009	81st Academy Awards February 22, 2009
Category/Organization	14th Critics' Choice Awards January 8, 2009	Drama	Musical or Comedy	Producers, Directors, Screen Actors, and Writers Guild Awards	62nd BAFTA Awards February 8, 2009	81st Academy Awards February 22, 2009
Best Film	Slumdog Millionaire		Vicky Cristina Barcelona	Slumdog Millionaire		
Best Director	Danny Boyle; Slumdog Millionaire					
Best Actor	Sean Penn; Milk	Mickey Rourke; The Wrestler	Colin Farrell; In Bruges	Sean Penn; Milk	Mickey Rourke; The Wrestler	Sean Penn; Milk
Best Actress	Anne Hathaway; Rachel Getting Married; Meryl Streep; Doubt	Kate Winslet; Revolutionary Road	Sally Hawkins; Happy-Go-Lucky	Meryl Streep; Doubt	Kate Winslet; The Reader	
Best Supporting Actor	Heath Ledger; The Dark Knight					
Best Supporting Actress	Kate Winslet; The Reader				Penélope Cruz; Vicky Cristina Barcelona	
Best Screenplay, Adapted	Simon Beaufoy; Slumdog Millionaire			Simon Beaufoy; Slumdog Millionaire		
Best Screenplay, Original	Simon Beaufoy; Slumdog Millionaire			Martin McDonagh; In Bruges		Dustin Lance Black; Milk
Best Animated Film	WALL-E					
Best Original Score	Slumdog Millionaire; A. R. Rahman		—N/a	Slumdog Millionaire; A. R. Rahman		
Best Original Song	"The Wrestler"; The Wrestler		—N/a	—N/a		"Jai Ho"; Slumdog Millionaire
Best Foreign Language Film	Waltz with Bashir		—N/a	—N/a	I've Loved You So Long	Departures
Best Documentary	Man on Wire; Stealing America: Vote by Vote (tie)	—N/a	—N/a	Man on Wire	—N/a	Man on Wire

Palme d'Or (61st Cannes Film Festival):

The Class (Entre les murs), directed by Laurent Cantet, France

Golden Lion (65th Venice International Film Festival):

The Wrestler, directed by Darren Aronofsky, United States

Golden Bear (58th Berlin International Film Festival):

Elite Squad (Tropa de Elite), directed by José Padilha, Brazil

People's Choice Award (33rd Toronto International Film Festival):

Slumdog Millionaire, directed by Danny Boyle, United Kingdom

== 2008 films ==
=== By country/region ===
- List of American films of 2008
- List of Argentine films of 2008
- List of Australian films of 2008
- List of Bangladeshi films of 2008
- List of Bengali films of 2008
- List of Bollywood films of 2008
- List of Brazilian films of 2008
- List of British films of 2008
- List of Canadian films of 2008
- List of Chinese films of 2008
- List of French films of 2008
- List of Hindi films of 2008
- List of Hong Kong films of 2008
- List of Italian films of 2008
- List of Japanese films of 2008
- List of Mexican films of the 2000s
- List of Pakistani films of 2008
- List of Russian films of 2008
- List of South Korean films of 2008
- List of Spanish films of 2008
- List of Kannada films of 2008
- List of Malayalam films of 2008
- List of Tamil films of 2008
- List of Telugu films of 2008
- List of Turkish films of 2008

=== By genre/medium ===
- List of action films of 2008
- List of animated feature films of 2008
- List of avant-garde films of 2008
- List of crime films of 2008
- List of comedy films of 2008
- List of drama films of 2008
- List of horror films of 2008
- List of science fiction films of 2008
- List of thriller films of 2008
- List of western films of 2008

== Births ==
- January 3 – Raegan Revord, American actress
- January 24 – Chlaui Malayao, Filipina child actress
- March 12 – Cameron Crovetti, American actor
- March 14 – Abby Ryder Fortson, American actress
- March 17 - Kaylee Hottle, American deaf actress (died 2026)
- April 17 - Gavin Warren, American actor
- June 3 – Harshaali Malhotra, Indian actress
- June 10 – Helena Zengel, German actress
- June 14 – Giulia Benite, Brazilian actress
- July 15 – Iain Armitage, American actor
- July 17 – Jensen Gering, American actor
- July 19 – Beau Gadsdon, British actress
- July 31 – Banks Repeta, American actor
- August 1 – Emma Berman, American actress
- August 5
  - Izzy G., American actress
  - Hudson Meek, American actor (died 2024)
- August 31 – Milo Machado-Graner, French actor
- September 18 – Jackson Robert Scott, American actor
- October 15 - Colin O'Brien, American actor
- November 2 - Sunny Sandler, American actress
- November 23
  - Asher Blinkoff, American actor
  - Chloe Coleman, American actress
- December 22 – Madeleine McGraw, American actress
  - December 31 - Evie Templeton, British actress

== Deaths ==
Month	Date	Name	Age	Country	Profession	Notable films
January	1	Peter Caffrey	58	Ireland	Actor	I Went Down; Taffin
January	2	George MacDonald Fraser	82	UK	Screenwriter	The Three Musketeers; Red Sonja
January	2	Brice Mack	90	US	Background Artist	Fantasia; Alice in Wonderland
January	5	Edward Kłosiński	65	Poland	Cinematographer	Three Colours: White; Europa
January	10	Maila "Vampira" Nurmi	86	US	Actress	Plan 9 from Outer Space; Sex Kittens Go to College
January	15	Brad Renfro	25	US	Actor	The Client; Ghost World
January	18	Lois Nettleton	80	US	Actress	Period of Adjustment; Butterfly
January	19	Suzanne Pleshette	70	US	Actress	The Birds; Support Your Local Gunfighter
January	21	Russell Lloyd	92	UK	Film Editor	The Man Who Would Be King; Moby Dick
January	22	Kenneth Higgins	88	UK	Cinematographer	Georgy Girl; Darling
January	22	Heath Ledger	28	Australia	Actor	The Dark Knight; Brokeback Mountain
January	22	Kevin Stoney	87	UK	Actor	Strongroom; The Blood Beast Terror
January	25	Christopher Allport	60	US	Actor	To Live and Die in L.A.; The Lincoln Conspiracy
January	25	Louisa Horton	87	US	Actress	All My Sons; Swashbuckler
February	2	Barry Morse	89	UK	Actor	Kings of the Sun; The Changeling
February	3	Charles Fawcett	92	US	Actor	War and Peace; The 300 Spartans
February	4	Augusta Dabney	89	US	Actress	That Night!; The Paper
February	6	John Alvin	59	US	Poster Artist	Star Wars; E.T. the Extra-Terrestrial
February	7	Tamara Desni	94	Germany	Actress	Fire Over England; Blue Smoke
February	8	Eva Dahlbeck	87	Sweden	Actress	Secrets of Women; A Lesson in Love
February	9	Robert DoQui	73	US	Actor	RoboCop; Nashville
February	10	Roy Scheider	75	US	Actor	Jaws; The French Connection
February	11	James Quinn	88	UK	Producer	Herostratus; Overlord
February	12	Oscar Brodney	100	US	Screenwriter	Harvey; The Glenn Miller Story
February	12	David Groh	68	US	Actor	Two-Minute Warning; The Return of Superfly
February	13	Kon Ichikawa	92	Japan	Director	The Burmese Harp; Tokyo Olympiad
February	13	Lionel Mark Smith	62	US	Actor	Magnolia; Spartan
February	14	Perry Lopez	76	US	Actor	Chinatown; Kelly's Heroes
February	14	Trevor Williams	76	UK	Production Designer	Police Academy; The Changeling
February	18	Alain Robbe-Grillet	85	France	Screenwriter, Director	Last Year at Marienbad; L'Immortelle
February	19	Mary Barclay	91	UK	Actress	A Touch of Class; Rasputin the Mad Monk
February	19	David Hildyard	91	UK	Sound Engineer	Cabaret; Fiddler on the Roof
February	19	David Watkin	82	UK	Cinematographer	Out of Africa; Chariots of Fire
February	22	Dennis Letts	73	US	Actor	Cast Away; A Perfect World
February	23	Carl Pingitore	84	US	Film Editor	Dirty Harry; Play Misty for Me
February	25	Sidney Beckerman	87	US	Producer	Marathon Man; Red Dawn
February	28	John Bliss	77	US	Actor	Intolerable Cruelty; Art School Confidential
February	29	Gayne Rescher	83	US	Cinematographer	Star Trek II: The Wrath of Khan; A Face in the Crowd
March	4	Leonard Rosenman	83	US	Composer	Barry Lyndon; Bound for Glory
March	5	Ronald Pierce	98	US	Sound Engineer	The Sting; Earthquake
March	6	Alex Sharp	86	US	Stuntman, Actor	The Goonies; Planet of the Apes
March	6	Malvin Wald	90	US	Screenwriter	The Naked City; Al Capone
March	7	Kay Callard	84	Canada	Actress	West of Suez; The Flying Scot
March	7	George Tyne	91	US	Actor	A Walk in the Sun; Sands of Iwo Jima
March	16	Ivan Dixon	76	US	Actor, Director	A Patch of Blue; A Raisin in the Sun
March	18	Anthony Minghella	54	UK	Director, Screenwriter, Producer	The English Patient; Cold Mountain
March	19	Arthur C. Clarke	90	UK	Screenwriter	2001: A Space Odyssey
March	19	Paul Scofield	86	UK	Actor	A Man for All Seasons; Quiz Show
March	24	Rafael Azcona	81	Spain	Screenwriter	Belle Époque; La Grande Bouffe
March	24	Richard Widmark	93	US	Actor	Kiss of Death; Judgment at Nuremberg
March	25	Art Aragon	80	US	Actor	Fat City; To Hell and Back
March	25	Abby Mann	80	US	Screenwriter	Judgment at Nuremberg; A Child Is Waiting
March	31	Jules Dassin	96	US	Director	The Naked City; Never on Sunday
April	1	Mosko Alkalai	77	Israel	Actor	Blaumilch Canal; The Fox in the Chicken Coop
April	1	Floyd Simmons	84	US	Actor	Written on the Wind; South Pacific
April	1	Maury Winetrobe	85	US	Film Editor	Funny Girl; Ice Castles
April	2	Guy McElwaine	71	US	Producer, Executive	Exorcist: The Beginning; The Good Shepherd
April	5	Charlton Heston	84	US	Actor	Ben-Hur; The Ten Commandments
April	8	Stanley Kamel	65	US	Actor	Domino; Inland Empire
April	11	Willoughby Goddard	81	UK	Actor	Young Sherlock Holmes; Jabberwocky
April	14	Ollie Johnston	95	US	Animator	Snow White and the Seven Dwarfs; The Jungle Book
April	14	June Travis	93	US	Actress	Ceiling Zero; The Case of the Black Cat
April	15	Hazel Court	93	UK	Actress	The Raven; The Curse of Frankenstein
April	18	Kay Linaker	94	US	Actress, Screenwriter	The Murder of Dr. Harrigan; Charlie Chan in Rio
April	18	Joy Page	83	US	Actress	Casablanca; The Bullfighter and the Lady
April	23	Dave Atkins	67	UK	Actor	Hellraiser; Plunkett & Macleane
April	24	Tristram Cary	82	UK	Composer	The Ladykillers; Quatermass and the Pit
April	28	Alan Jaggs	90	UK	Film Editor	Treasure Island; Conquest of the Planet of the Apes
April	29	Julie Ege	64	Norway	Actress	On Her Majesty's Secret Service; Up Pompeii
May	1	Bernard Archard	91	UK	Actor	The Day of the Jackal; Krull
May	1	Terry Duggan	76	UK	Actor	2001: A Space Odyssey; Beautiful Thing
May	2	Beverlee McKinsey	72	US	Actress	They Shoot Horses, Don't They?; Bronco Billy
May	4	Fred Haines	72	US	Screenwriter, Director	Ulysses; Steppenwolf
May	8	Dorothy Green	88	US	Actress	The Big Heat; Palm Springs Weekend
May	12	Robert Russell	71	UK	Actor	Bedazzled; Witchfinder General
May	12	Claudio Undari	73	Italy	Actor	Sabata; Everything Happens to Me
May	13	Jill Adams	77	UK	Actress	The Green Man; Private's Progress
May	13	John Phillip Law	70	US	Actor	Barbarella; Danger: Diabolik
May	14	John Forbes-Robertson	80	UK	Actor	The Vampire Lovers; The Vault of Horror
May	15	Alexander Courage	88	US	Orchestrator, Composer	Jurassic Park; The Mummy
May	15	Hanna Hertelendy	88	Hungary	Actress	Rosemary's Baby; In Like Flint
May	16	Sandy Howard	80	US	Director, Producer	Meteor; A Man Called Horse
May	18	Irma Córdoba	94	Argentina	Actress	Outside the Law; Atorrante
May	18	Joseph Pevney	96	US	Director	Female on the Beach; Tammy and the Bachelor
May	22	Harry Lange	77	Germany	Production Designer	Return of the Jedi; 2001: A Space Odyssey
May	24	Dick Martin	86	US	Actor	The Glass Bottom Boat; Air Bud: Golden Receiver
May	26	Sydney Pollack	73	US	Director, Producer, Actor	Out of Africa; Tootsie
May	28	Earle Hagen	88	US	Composer, Orchestrator	Call Me Madam; Gentlemen Prefer Blondes
May	29	Harvey Korman	81	US	Actor	Blazing Saddles; Dracula: Dead and Loving It
June	2	Bo Diddley	79	US	Singer, Actor	Trading Places; Blues Brothers 2000
June	2	Mel Ferrer	90	US	Actor, Director	Scaramouche; Lili
June	7	Dino Risi	91	Italy	Director, Screenwriter	The Easy Life; Torture Me But Kill Me with Kisses
June	11	Jean Desailly	87	France	Actor	La Peau Douce; Le Professionnel
June	15	Sydney J. Bartholomew Jr.	54	US	Production Designer	Dumb and Dumber; Me, Myself & Irene
June	15	Stan Winston	62	US	Makeup Artist	Jurassic Park; Aliens
June	17	Henry Beckman	86	Canada	Actor	Breakfast at Tiffany's; Marnie
June	17	Cyd Charisse	86	US	Actress, Dancer	The Band Wagon; Silk Stockings
June	18	Jean Delannoy	100	France	Director	La Symphonie Pastorale; Les amitiés particulières
June	22	George Carlin	71	US	Actor, Comedian	Bill & Ted's Excellent Adventure; Dogma
June	22	Dody Goodman	93	US	Actress	Grease; Splash
June	23	John Furlong	75	US	Actor	Blazing Saddles; All the President's Men
June	24	William Vince	45	Canada	Producer	Capote; Crash
June	26	Lilyan Chauvin	82	France	Actress	Lost, Lonely and Vicious; Silent Night, Deadly Night
June	29	Don S. Davis	67	US	Actor	Con Air; Cliffhanger
July	1	Adele Palmer	92	US	Costume Designer	The Best of Everything; The Quiet Man
July	2	Elizabeth Spriggs	78	UK	Actress	Sense and Sensibility; Paradise Road
July	4	Evelyn Keyes	91	US	Actress	Gone with the Wind; The Seven Year Itch
July	6	Nonna Mordyukova	82	Russia	Actress	Commissar; The Diamond Arm
July	7	Bruce Conner	74	US	Director	A Movie; Marilyn Times Five
July	8	Harry Spalding	95	Canada	Screenwriter	The Watcher in the Woods; Chosen Survivors
July	9	Charles H. Joffe	78	US	Producer	Annie Hall; Manhattan
July	17	Larry Haines	89	US	Actor	The Odd Couple; The Seven-Ups
July	22	Greg Burson	59	US	Voice Actor	Jurassic Park; Mr. Magoo
July	22	Patrick Connor	81	UK	Actor	Brazil; Lifeforce
July	22	Estelle Getty	84	US	Actress	Mannequin; Stop! Or My Mom Will Shoot
July	27	Youssef Chahine	82	Egypt	Director	Sira` Fi al-Wadi; Le Chaos
July	27	Marisa Merlini	84	Italy	Actress	Pane, Amore e Fantasia; The Traffic Policeman
July	29	Luther Davis	91	US	Screenwriter	Kismet; Lady in a Cage
August	1	Gertan Klauber	76	UK	Actor	Carry On; Octopussy
August	7	Bernie Brillstein	77	US	Producer	The Blues Brothers; Ghostbusters
August	9	Bernie Mac	50	US	Actor, Comedian	Ocean's Eleven; Guess Who
August	10	Isaac Hayes	65	US	Actor, Singer, Songwriter	Shaft; Escape from New York
August	11	George Furth	75	US	Actor	The Cannonball Run; Blazing Saddles
August	11	Terence Rigby	71	UK	Actor	Get Carter; Tomorrow Never Dies
August	14	Robert Jessup	78	US	Cinematographer	Race with the Devil; Silent Rage
August	15	Molly McClure	89	US	Actress	Mrs. Doubtfire; City Slickers
August	16	Roberta Collins	63	US	Actress	Death Race 2000; Caged Heat
August	19	Julius Carry	56	US	Actor	The Last Dragon; The New Guy
August	24	Morris Sullivan	91	US	Producer	All Dogs Go to Heaven; Rock-a-Doodle
August	24	Peter Sutton	65	UK	Sound Engineer	The Empire Strikes Back; Labyrinth
August	25	Marpessa Dawn	74	US	Actor	Black Orpheus; Le Bal du Comte d'Orgel
August	25	Rita Quigley	85	US	Actress	Whispering Footsteps; The Howards of Virginia
August	31	Ken Campbell	66	UK	Actor	A Fish Called Wanda; Creep
August	31	Jerry Reed	71	US	Actor, Singer	Smokey and the Bandit; The Waterboy
September	1	Michael Pate	88	Australia	Actor, Director	Thunder on the Hill; The Court Jester
September	2	Bill Melendez	91	Mexico	Animator, Director, Producer	Fantasia; A Boy Named Charlie Brown
September	6	Anita Page	98	US	Actress	Our Dancing Daughters; The Broadway Melody
September	8	Celia Gregory	58	UK	Actress	The Baby of Mâcon; Agatha
September	18	Florestano Vancini	82	Italy	Director, Screenwriter	The Assassination of Matteotti; Blow Hot, Blow Cold
September	19	David Jones	74	UK	Director	Betrayal; 84 Charing Cross Road
September	20	William Fox	97	UK	Actor	Omen III: The Final Conflict; The Lavender Hill Mob
September	24	Irene Dailey	88	US	Actress	Five Easy Pieces; The Amityville Horror
September	26	Paul Newman	83	US	Actor, Director	Cat on a Hot Tin Roof; The Color of Money
September	29	Louis Guss	90	US	Actor	The Godfather; Moonstruck
October	1	Robert Arthur	87	US	Actor	Ace in the Hole; Yellow Sky
October	5	Kim Chan	90	China	Actor	The Fifth Element; Lethal Weapon 4
October	5	Ken Ogata	71	Japan	Actor	The Pillow Book; Mishima: A Life in Four Chapters
October	7	Peter Copley	93	UK	Actor	The Sword and the Rose; The Elusive Pimpernel
October	8	Eileen Herlie	90	UK	Actress	The Story of Gilbert and Sullivan; Hamlet
October	11	Vija Artmane	79	Latvia	Actress	The Andromeda Nebula; The Arrows of Robin Hood
October	11	Neal Hefti	85	US	Composer	Batman; The Odd Couple
October	11	Mark Shivas	70	UK	Producer	The Witches; Jude
October	11	Gil Stratton	86	US	Actor	Stalag 17; Girl Crazy
October	13	Guillaume Depardieu	37	France	Actor	Tous les matins du monde; Pola X
October	15	Edie Adams	81	US	Actress	The Apartment; It's a Mad, Mad, Mad, Mad World
October	15	Nathan Davis	91	US	Actor	Thief; Risky Business
October	15	Vicki Graef	58	US	Costume Designer	Half Baked; Assault on Precinct 13
October	18	Xie Jin	84	China	Director	Hibiscus Town; Legend of Tianyun Mountain
October	19	Rudy Ray Moore	81	US	Actor	Dolemite; The Human Tornado
October	23	Gianluigi Braschi	45	Italy	Producer	Life Is Beautiful; The Monster
October	24	Milton Katselas	75	US	Director	Butterflies Are Free; 40 Carats
October	27	Roy Stewart	83	Jamaica	Actor	Live and Let Die; Twins of Evil
October	31	Jonathan Bates	68	UK	Sound Engineer	Gandhi; A Fish Called Wanda
October	31	John Daly	71	UK	Producer	The Terminator; Platoon
November	1	Yma Sumac	85	Peru	Singer, Actress	Secret of the Incas; Omar Khayyam
November	5	B. R. Chopra	94	India	Director, Producer	Naya Daur; Kanoon
November	5	Michael Crichton	66	US	Screenwriter, Director	Jurassic Park; Twister
November	5	Michael Higgins	88	US	Actor	Death Becomes Her; The Conversation
November	8	Arthur A. Ross	88	US	Screenwriter	Brubaker; The Great Race
November	11	María Elena Marqués	81	Mexico	Actress, Singer	The Pearl; Romeo and Juliet
November	17	Irving Brecher	94	US	Screenwriter, Director	Meet Me in St. Louis; Bye Bye Birdie
November	17	Ennio De Concini	84	Italy	Screenwriter	Divorce Italian Style; Black Sunday
November	19	John Michael Hayes	89	US	Screenwriter	Rear Window; To Catch a Thief
November	20	June Vincent	89	US	Actress	Black Angel; Shed No Tears
November	26	De'Angelo Wilson	29	US	Actor	8 Mile; Antwone Fisher
December	1	Paul Benedict	70	US	Actor	This Is Spinal Tap; The Addams Family
December	2	Malcolm Cooke	79	UK	Film Editor	Flash Gordon; Death on the Nile
December	5	Nina Foch	84	Netherlands	Actress	An American in Paris; Scaramouche
December	5	Beverly Garland	82	US	Actress	D.O.A.; Gunslinger
December	8	Robert Prosky	77	US	Actor	Thief; Dead Man Walking
December	8	Bob Spiers	63	UK	Director	Spice World; That Darn Cat
December	12	Van Johnson	92	US	Actor	The Caine Mutiny; A Guy Named Joe
December	13	Christine Carère	78	France	Actress	Don Juan; A Certain Smile
December	16	Sam Bottoms	53	US	Actor	Apocalypse Now; The Outlaw Josey Wales
December	16	Richard Coleman	78	UK	Actor	Ben-Hur; The Dam Busters
December	17	Paul Greco	53	US	Actor	The Warriors; Next of Kin
December	18	John Costelloe	47	US	Actor	Die Hard 2; Doubt
December	18	Jack Douglas	81	UK	Actor	Carry On; The Boys in Blue
December	20	Robert Mulligan	83	US	Director	To Kill a Mockingbird; Summer of '42
December	21	Dale Wasserman	94	US	Screenwriter	Man of La Mancha; Mister Buddwing
December	24	Harold Pinter	78	UK	Screenwriter, Actor, Director	Sleuth; The French Lieutenant's Woman
December	25	Eartha Kitt	81	US	Actress, Singer	The Emperor's New Groove; Holes
December	25	Ann Savage	87	US	Actress	Detour; Apology for Murder
December	30	Bernie Hamilton	80	US	Actor	The Swimmer; Carmen Jones
December	31	Brad Sullivan	77	US	Actor	The Untouchables; The Sting
December	31	Donald E. Westlake	75	Mexico	Screenwriter	The Stepfather; The Grifters

== Film debuts ==
- Susana Abaitua – The Good News
- Mahershala Ali – The Curious Case of Benjamin Button
- Nerea Camacho – Camino
- Jessica Chastain – Jolene
- Emory Cohen – Afterschool
- Nelly Furtado – Max Payne
- Boyd Holbrook – Milk
- Felicity Jones – Flashbacks of a Fool
- Joey King – Horton Hears a Who!
- Nick Kroll – Adventures of Power
- Jennifer Lawrence – Garden Party
- Thom Michael Mulligan – A Gothic Tale
- Margot Robbie – Vigilante
- Gina Rodriguez – Calling It Quits
- Jeremy Strong – Humboldt County
- Sai Tamhankar – Black & White

== See also ==
- 2008
