= Take the 5:10 to Dreamland =

- Directed by: Bruce Conner
- Release date: 1976
- Running time: 6 minutes
- Country: United States

Take the 5:10 to Dreamland is a 1976 short experimental film by Bruce Conner, using the technique of found footage. It is composed out of found images from the 1940s–1950s from different sources such as educational hm and soundtrack. It is closely related to Valse Triste, another found footage short by Bruce Conner.

== Background and production ==
The main catalyst for Take the 5:10 to Dreamland was the soundtrack composed by Patrick Gleeson, a dreamlike trance of different long, pacing tones and birdcalls. According to Bruce Conner, the first time he heard the composition, he started to envision dreamlike images appearing and disappearing.

The sepia tinting, which adds a lot to the nostalgic atmosphere, was actually unintentional and the result of a couple of problems Conner and Gleeson had with the transformation of the sound to the optical printer.

Bruce Conner: "It seemed to me that the appropriate color was sepia, but I wouldn’t have thought about making a sepia-toned print if that situation hadn’t occurred."

== Relation to Valse Triste (1977) ==
After finishing Take the 5:10 to Dreamland, Bruce Conner started working on Valse Triste (1977), which he calls "an extension of Take the 5:10 to Dreamland". Although he didn't have the same sound problems with this film, he decided to make it sepia-toned as well, so the two films go together as a pair. Some of the images of Take the 5:10 to Dreamland are re-used. The dream is present again; the first shot is a little boy going to sleep, the images that follow are his 'dream' about the past, full of trains, cars, factories, typical American suburbs and fences. Nature is almost absent here; we see images of men and industry, images in movement. The rhythm is quicker, and the sad but vivid waltz on the soundtrack give this film an entire other feel, less dreamlike and more specifically rooted in the nostalgic American past.

== Influences ==
Both films are a homage to surrealist cinema and the trance films of Maya Deren, Kenneth Anger and Sidney Peterson.

The radio show I Love A Mystery (a program Bruce loved as a kid to the tune by Sibelius) also influenced Valse Triste.

== See also ==
- "Mongoloid"
- A Movie – 1958 experimental collage film directed by Bruce Conner
- Report
