= Cosmic Ray (film) =

1962 film

- Directed by: Bruce Conner
- Starring: Beth Pewther; Joan Brown
- Music by: Ray Charles
- Release date: March 1962
- Running time: 4 minutes
- Country: United States
- Language: English

Cosmic Ray is a 1962 American experimental short film directed by Bruce Conner. With both found footage and original material, it features images of countdown leader, a nude woman dancing, a Mickey Mouse cartoon, and military exercises. It is soundtracked by a performance of Ray Charles's "What'd I Say" and has been recognized by some critics as one of the first music videos.

== Synopsis ==
The film is soundtracked by a live recording of Ray Charles's "What'd I Say". During the song's opening, the film begins with an extended section of black leader, followed by multiple countdown leaders. Its first images are of artist Beth Pewther dancing nude, superimposed with street lights and fireworks. A variety of found images are intercut, including mushroom clouds and imagery of American militia. The climax of the film comes in a sequence where weapons from documentaries are edited with a Mickey Mouse cartoon, in which a phallic cannon fires at Mickey before falling limp. This leads to a passage in which Pewther appears holding a skull and painter Joan Brown sits stationary wearing different types of headgear. The film ends with black leader as an announcer closes the show.

== Production ==
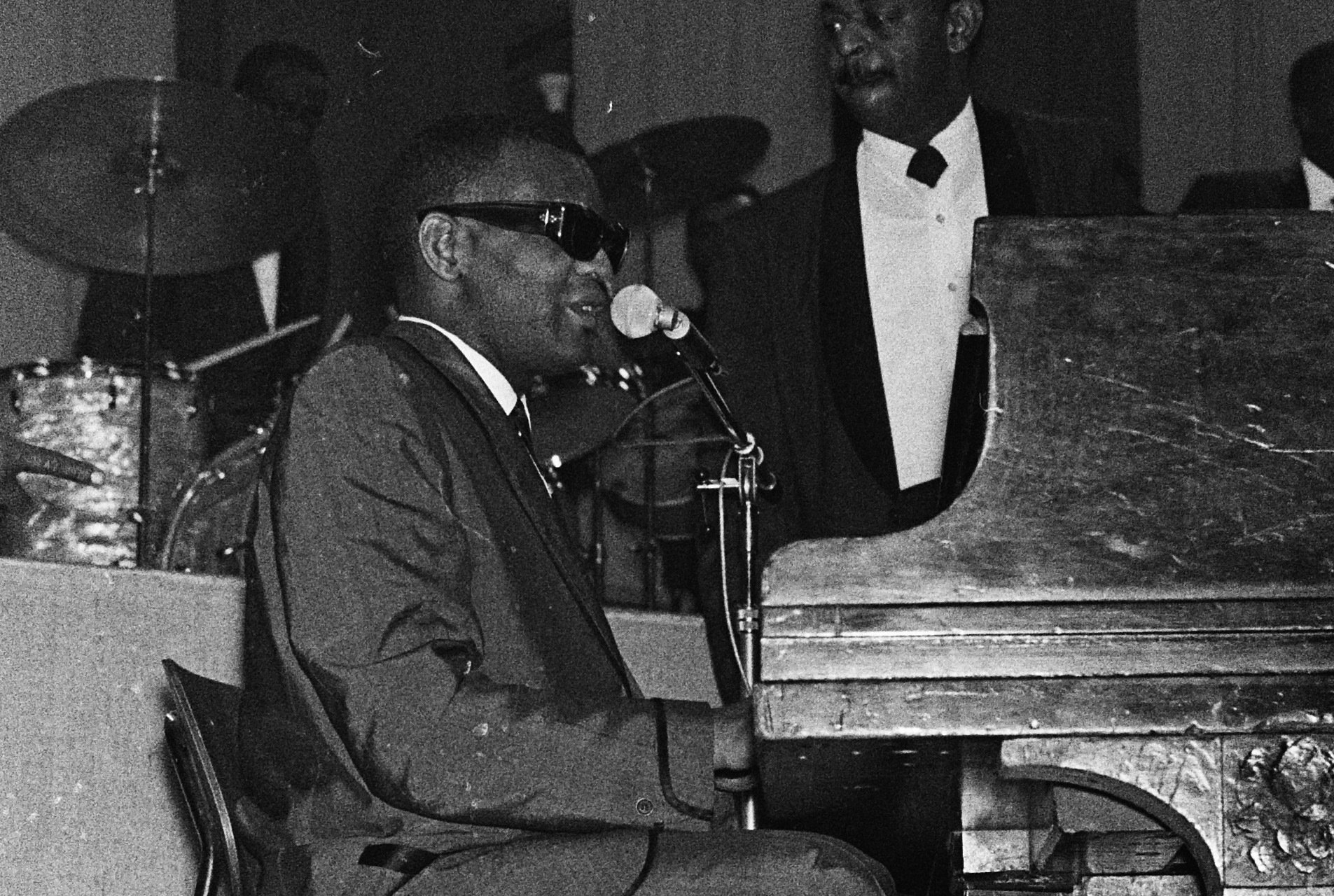
The film's soundtrack uses a live performance by Ray Charles (pictured in 1963).

Conner's first film, A Movie, was a collage film made almost entirely out of found footage. For his next project, he began shooting more original material. He filmed local artist Beth Pewther dancing and painter Joan Brown wearing various costumes. Conner's highly kinetic approach to the handheld camera led to images that were often out of focus or streaked from loss of registration.

Conner edited the footage to a concert performance from Ray Charles in Person, of Charles performing "What'd I Say" in Atlanta. Discussing the connection between the music and image, he explained, "I felt that I was, in a way, presenting the eyes for Ray Charles, who is a blind musician…I was supplying his vision." Conner spent four months editing the film. He began in 1960 while living in San Francisco but was interrupted when Conner moved to Mexico City. There, Walter Hopps assisted him in finishing the film and it was completed in 1961. Conner's editing made use of layered superimpositions and abraded the film strip using punch holes. The film's title is a pun on the name of the particle and that of Ray Charles.

== Themes ==
Critics P. Adams Sitney and R. Bruce Elder draw parallels between the structure of Cosmic Ray and that of a sexual encounter, with the Mickey Mouse sequence serving as the climax. The film in turn attracts and repels viewers as it alternates between images of eroticism and violence. Conner had envisioned the film as an anti-war statement.

I see the relationship…as a battle between creative and destructive forces. If the creative forces can be re-channeled into the services of destructive forces, the destruction is even more powerful than it ever was before…Here were the elements involved basically with the creative process—the life process, of sex, being born, children, birth. And that process was being twisted and turned around into alienation, distancing between people so that you couldn't understand them at all.

— Bruce Conner, 1974

The mushroom cloud is a recurring image in Conner's work, also appearing in A Movie and Crossroads. In dealing with cinematic images that are normally unseen or unnoticed, Conner includes a china girl, an image of a woman used in film leader.

== Release ==
Cosmic Ray premiered in March 1962, at the Batman Gallery in San Francisco. Conner's options for screening it were limited because the film showed a woman's pubic hair. Curator John Coplans arranged a show at California College of Arts and Crafts later that year but had difficulty finding a museum or theatre to screen it.

The film was screened at the second Knokke-Le-Zoute Experimental Film Festival in 1963. Conner was eventually able to secure multiple distributors for Cosmic Ray: Canyon Cinema, the Film-Makers' Cooperative, the Museum of Modern Art, Cinema 16, and the Creative Film Society. Chick Strand recalled Canyon's first screening of it, at the Berkeley YMCA, "The audience would not let us stop showing it. The place was rocking; they were all pretty stoned." The film's high profile was beneficial for the recently founded distributor.

== Reception and legacy ==
The film was well-received upon release. Sheldon Renan called Cosmic Ray one of "the most successful audience pleasers in the underground." In a review for The New York Times, Brian O'Doherty described it as "a Pop art masterpiece, with a sophistication of means, a control of ambiguous effects and expressive intent far removed from surrealism." The review, which also covered a gallery exhibition, created confusion as people expected Conner's films to be part of the exhibition, and he struggled to sell his assemblage and collage work. This caused Conner to resent the emphasis placed on his filmmaking over work in other media.

The film was awarded third prize at the 1964 Independent Film-Makers Festival in Palo Alto, California. Cosmic Ray earned Conner a $10,000 grant from the Ford Foundation. It has been credited as one of the first music videos. The film is part of Anthology Film Archives' Essential Cinema Repertory collection.

== Alternate versions ==
In 1965, Conner created Eve-Ray-Forever, a multiscreen projection of three 8 mm films. The center film is a copy of the last two thirds of Cosmic Ray. The left film combines the rest of Cosmic Ray with new material. The right film contains outtakes of Beth Pewther and other footage. The three films have different lengths, so when played on a loop, they sync in different ways each time. The Rose Art Museum purchased Eve-Ray-Forever for $150.

By the 2000s, the film materials had degraded to the point that they could not easily be restored. Although Conner wanted his work to be exhibited on film, he eventually allowed them to be digitized. He worked with editor Michelle Silva to create Three Screen Ray, a three-channel version of Cosmic Ray. When it appeared in a 2016 retrospective of Conner's works, J. Hoberman listed it as the best film of the year.

== See also ==
- Jump cut
- 1962 in film

== Sources ==
- Anker, Steve; Geritz, Kathy; Seid, Steve, eds. (2010). Radical Light: Alternative Film and Video in the San Francisco Bay Area, 1945–2000. University of California Press. ISBN 978-0-520-24911-0.
- Brakhage, Stan (1989). Film at Wit's End: Eight Avant-Garde Filmmakers. McPherson & Company. ISBN 978-0-929701-16-5.
- Crow, Thomas (2023). The Artist in the Counterculture. Princeton University Press. ISBN 978-0-691-23616-2.
- Curtis, David (2020). London's Arts Labs and the 60s Avant-Garde. Indiana University Press. ISBN 978-0-86196-748-3.
- Elder, R. Bruce (2006). A Body of Vision: Representations of the Body in Recent Film and Poetry. Wilfrid Laurier University Press. ISBN 978-0-88920-276-4.
- Hatch, Kevin (2012). Looking for Bruce Conner. MIT Press. ISBN 978-0-262-01681-0.
- MacDonald, Scott (2008). Canyon Cinema: The Life and Times of an Independent Film Distributor. University of California Press. ISBN 978-0-520-25087-1.
- Renan, Sheldon (1967). An Introduction to the American Underground Film. E. P. Dutton.
- Sitney, P. Adams (2002). Visionary Film: The American Avant-Garde, 1943–2000. Oxford University Press. ISBN 978-0-19-514886-2.
- Yue, Genevieve (2020). Girl Head: Feminism and Film Materiality. Fordham University Press. ISBN 978-0-8232-8956-1.
