= Valse Triste (film) =

- Directed by: Bruce Conner
- Release date: 1977
- Running time: 5 minutes
- Country: United States

Valse Triste is a 1977 five minute experimental collage film by Bruce Conner set to Jean Sibelius's piece of the same name.

== Summary ==
An autobiographical take of the filmmaker's childhood in 1940s Kansas with sources that parallels his own life experiences.

== Relation to Take the 5:10 to Dreamland (1976) ==
After finishing Take the 5:10 to Dreamland, Bruce Conner started working on this film, which he calls ‘an extension of Take the 5:10 to Dreamland’ . Although he didn't have the same sound problems with this film, he decided to make it sepia-toned as well, so the two films go together as a pair. Some of the images of Take the 5:10 to Dreamland are re-used. The dream is present again; the first shot is a little boy going to sleep, the images that follow are his ‘dream’ about the past, full of trains, cars, factories, typical American suburbs and fences. Nature is almost absent here; we see images of men and industry, images in movement. The rhythm is quicker, and the sad but vivid waltz on the soundtrack give this film an entire other feel, less dreamlike and more specifically rooted in the nostalgic American past.

== Influences ==
The film a homage to surrealist cinema and the trance films of Maya Deren, Kenneth Anger and Sidney Peterson.

The radio show I Love A Mystery (a program Bruce loved as a kid to the tune by Sibelius) also influenced Valse Triste.
