= Jean Conner =

American artist (born 1933)

- Born: Jean Sandstedt; 1933 (age 92–93); Lincoln, Nebraska, US
- Education: University of Nebraska; University of Colorado
- Known for: Collage, Painting
- Spouse: Bruce Conner

Jean Conner née Sandstedt (born 1933) is an American artist.

== Biography ==
Jean Conner was born in Lincoln, Nebraska and earned her BFA from the University of Nebraska, going on to earn her MFA from the University of Colorado, Boulder.

Conner was part of the "Rat Bastard Collective". She married Bruce Conner in 1957. They moved to San Francisco.

Conner has five works in the collection of the San Francisco Museum of Modern Art. In 2017, her work was shown at Karma Gallery. The San Jose Museum of Art will present the first comprehensive solo exhibition of her work with an accompanying publication from May 7-Sept 25, 2022.

== Work ==
Jean Conner creates intimate, moody collages with images of women and the natural world, which are often appropriated from magazines and advertisements. She appeared as part of the small but influential scene of the Bay Area in the 1950s and 60s, and until recently she rarely showed her work in public. Conner's work is the collections of the Whitney Museum of American Art, San Francisco Museum of Modern Art, the Museum of Contemporary Art, Los Angeles, and the San Jose Museum of Art.
