= Breakaway (1966 film) =

- Directed by: Bruce Conner
- Starring: Toni Basil
- Cinematography: Bruce Conner
- Edited by: Bruce Conner
- Music by: Toni Basil
- Release date: 1966
- Running time: 5 minutes
- Country: United States
- Language: English

Breakaway is a 1966 American short film by Bruce Conner. It shows Toni Basil dancing to her song "Breakaway". The film has a palindromic structure in which the second half of the film reverses the image and sound of the first half. Breakaway is often cited as a precursor to the development of the music video.

== Description ==
Breakaway is a 5-minute black-and-white film showing Basil against a black backdrop, set to her song of the same name. As it begins she poses in a black leotard, with black frames which create a strobing effect. During the first verse, she is shown in a white slip, and fast zooms move back and forth between extreme close-ups and medium shots. The first chorus contains a longer unbroken shot of Basil blowing a kiss and caressing herself. In the second verse, the film cross-cuts between shots in which Basil appears in different outfits, moving in and out of focus. The second chorus uses a slow motion of her jumping. The second half of the film is a reversed version of the sound and images in the first half, such that the two sections are mirror images of each other.

== Production ==
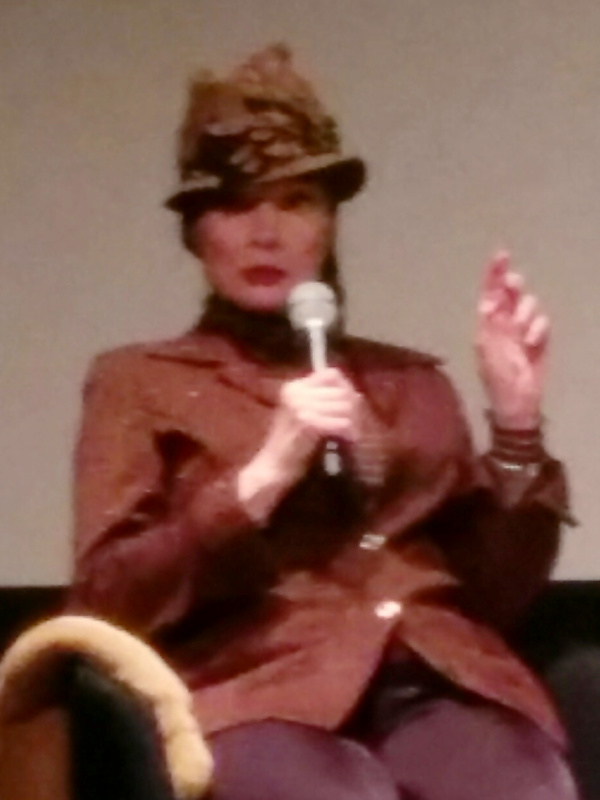
Breakaway stars Toni Basil (pictured in 2016).

Conner and Basil met through a group of mutual friends including Conner's roommate Dean Stockwell and Basil's boyfriend Dennis Hopper. Long before Basil had recorded her song, Conner approached her about putting her in a film. Basil provided her own wardrobe, making a flower garland and cutting out holes in her tights.

Shooting happened in October 1964, in an apartment on the Santa Monica Pier. Conner used a Bolex 16 mm camera. Stockwell was also there, filming the shoot. Footage from the first day of filming was largely unusable, so they continued for a second day with Hopper helping to light it. Basil improvised her choreography.

In February 1966, Basil released her debut single "I'm 28", with "Breakaway" as the B-side. Conner edited his earlier footage of Basil to the song later that year. Because of the hundreds of splices used, the editing process was laborious and lasted several weeks.

== Release ==
When Conner took over performances of the North American Ibis Alchemical Light Company, he used Breakaway for some of the shows. The film was not intended as a promotional device for the single, and Basil's frontal nudity in the film limited its commercial use. However, it became known as a precursor to the music video because of its fast editing, dancing, and soundtrack.

Shortly after Breakaway, Basil directed A Dance Film Inspired by the Music of Jim Morrison in 1968, a similarly experimental work which makes use of superimpositions and flicker effects. Stockwell's footage from the Breakaway shoot has been screened as a separate work, often with the Rolling Stones' "Goin' Home" as accompaniment. In 2006, Conner turned this footage into the short film Pas de Trois. The title refers to the dance of the three people on the set—Conner, Basil, and Stockwell.
