= Bruce Conner =

American artist (1933–2008)

- Born: Bruce Guldner Conner; November 18, 1933; McPherson, Kansas, U.S.
- Died: July 7, 2008 (aged 74); San Francisco, California, U.S.
- Education: University of Nebraska, University of Colorado
- Known for: Experimental film, assemblage, sculpture, painting, collage, photography, drawing, conceptual pranks
- Notable work: A Movie (film), Rat Bastard (assemblage)
- Spouse: Jean Conner

Bruce Conner (November 18, 1933 – July 7, 2008) was an American artist who worked with assemblage, film, drawing, sculpture, painting, collage, and photography.

== Biography ==
Bruce Conner was born November 18, 1933, in McPherson, Kansas. His well-to-do middle-class family moved to Wichita, when Conner was four. He attended high school in Wichita, Kansas. Conner studied at Wichita University (now Wichita State University) and later at University of Nebraska, where he graduated in 1956 with a bachelor of fine arts degree. During this time as a student he visited New York City. Conner worked in a variety of media from an early age.

=== Early career (mid 1950s / early 1960s) ===
In 1955, Conner studied for six months at Brooklyn Museum Art School on a scholarship. His first solo gallery show in New York City took place in 1956 and featured paintings. In 1957 Bruce Conner dropped out of the Master of Fine Arts (MFA) program at the University of Colorado in Boulder, Colorado and moved to San Francisco. His first solo shows in San Francisco, in 1958 and 1959, featured paintings, drawings, prints, collages, assemblages, and sculpture. The Designer's Gallery in San Francisco held Bruce's third solo show. The gallery featured black panels which set off his drawings. One of his paintings, Venus, was displayed in the gallery window. The painting showed a nude inside a form representing a clam shell. A local policeman confronted the gallery owners to get it removed, "as children in the neighborhood might see the painting." The American Civil Liberties Union stood behind the gallery's right to display it, and the matter never became an issue.

Conner first attracted widespread attention with his moody, nylon-shrouded assemblages, complex amalgams of found objects such as women's stockings, bicycle wheels, broken dolls, fur, fringe, costume jewelry, and candles, often combined with collaged or painted surfaces. Erotically charged and tinged with echoes of both the Surrealist tradition and of San Francisco's Victorian past, these works established Conner as a leading figure within the international assemblage "movement." Generally, these works do not have precise meanings, but some of them suggest what Conner saw as the discarded beauty of modern America, the deforming impact of society on the individual, violence against women, and consumerism. Social commentary and dissension remained a common theme among his later works.

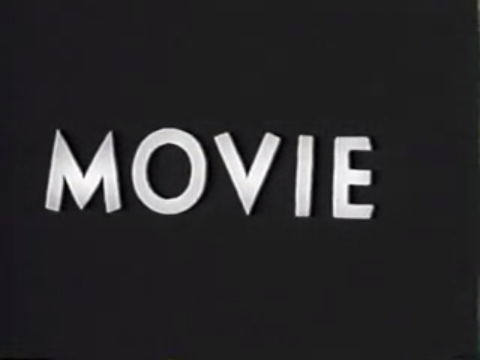
A Movie (1958)

Conner also began making short movies in the late 1950s. He explicitly titled his movies in all capital letters. Conner's first and possibly most famous film was entitled A Movie (1958). A Movie was a "poverty film", in that instead of shooting his own footage Conner used compilations of old newsreels and other old films. He skillfully re-edited that footage, set the visuals to a recording of Ottorino Respighi's Pines of Rome, and created an entertaining and thought-provoking 12-minute film, that while non-narrative has things to say about the experience of watching a movie and the human condition. In 1994, A Movie was selected for preservation by the National Film Registry at the Library of Congress. Conner subsequently made nearly two dozen mostly non-narrative experimental films.

In 1959, Conner founded what he called the Rat Bastard Protective Association. Its members included Jay DeFeo, Michael McClure (with whom Conner attended school in Wichita), Manuel Neri, Joan Brown, Wally Hedrick, Wallace Berman, Jess Collins, Carlos Villa and George Herms. Conner coined the name as a play on 'Scavengers Protective Society'. A 1959 exhibition at the Spatsa Gallery in San Francisco involved an early exploration by Conner into the notion of artistic identity. To publicize the show, the gallery printed up and distributed an exhibition announcement in the form of a small printed card with black borders (in the manner of a death announcement) with the text "Works by the Late Bruce Conner."

A work of Conner's titled Child—a small human figure sculpted in black wax, mouth agape as if in pain and partially wrapped in nylon stockings, seated in—and partly tied by the stockings to—a small, old wooden child's high chair—literally made headlines when displayed at San Francisco's De Young Museum in December 1959 and January 1960. A meditation or perhaps comment on the then pending Caryl Chessman execution, the work horrified many. "It's Not Murder, It's Art," the San Francisco Chronicle headlined; its competitor the News-Call Bulletin headlined its article, "The Unliked 'Child'". The sculpture was acquired by the New York Museum of Modern Art in 1970, but greatly deteriorated in subsequent years, such that the museum kept it in storage for long periods and Conner at times asked that it not be shown or suggested it no longer existed. In 2015–2016, another attempt to restore the work was undertaken, involving months-long efforts by two conservators. The work was successfully restored and displayed in It's All True, a retrospective exhibition which opened at Museum of Modern Art in July 2016.

A New York City exhibition of assemblages and collage in late 1960 garnered favorable attention in The New York Times, The New Yorker, Art News, and other national publications. Later that year Conner had the first exhibition at the Batman Gallery, in San Francisco; Ernest Burden, owner and designer of the Designer's Gallery in San Francisco assisted Conner and the Batman owners and had the entire gallery painted black, similar to the last show at the Designer's Gallery to showcase Bruce's work, and the show received very favorable reviews locally. Another exhibition in New York in 1961 again received positive notices.

In 1961, Conner completed his second film, Cosmic Ray, a 4-minute, 43 second black-and-white quick edit collage of found footage and film that Conner had shot himself, set to a soundtrack of Ray Charles' "What'd I Say." The movie premiered in 1962; most suggest the film concerns sex and war.

=== Mid-career (early 1960s to c. 2000) ===
Conner and his wife, artist Jean Conner, moved to Mexico c. 1962, despite the increasing popularity of his work. The two — along with their just-born son, Robert — returned to the USA and were living in Massachusetts in 1963, when John F. Kennedy was assassinated. Conner filmed the television coverage of the event and edited and re-edited the footage with stock footage into another meditation on violence which he titled Report. The film was issued several times as it was re-edited.

In 1964, Conner had a show at the Batman Gallery in San Francisco that lasted just three days, with Conner never leaving the gallery. The show was announced only via a small notice in the want ads of the Los Angeles Times. Part of the exhibition is documented in Conner's film Vivian. Toward the end of 1964, London's Robert Fraser Gallery hosted a show of Conner's work, which the artist documented in a film called London One Man Show. Also that year, Conner decided he would no longer make assemblages, even though it was precisely such work that had brought him the most attention.

According to Conner's friend and fellow film-maker Stan Brakhage in his book Film at Wit's End, Conner was signed into a New York gallery contract in the early 1960s, which stipulated stylistic and personal restraint beyond Conner's freewheeling nature. It is unlikely that Conner would ever sign such a restrictive document. Many send-ups of artistic authorship followed, including a five-page piece Conner had published in a major art publication in which Conner's making of a peanut butter, banana, bacon, lettuce, and Swiss cheese sandwich was reported step-by-step in great detail, with numerous photographs, as though it were a work of art. Just before Conner moved to Mexico in 1961, he repainted a worn sign on a road surface so that it read "Love".

Conner produced work in a variety of forms from the 1960s forward. He was an active force in the San Francisco counterculture of the mid-1960s as a collaborator in Liquid light shows at the legendary Family Dog Productions at the Avalon Ballroom. He also made—using the new-at-the-time felt-tip pens—intricate black-and-white mandala-like drawings, many of which he subsequently (in the very early 1970s) lithographed into prints. One of Conner's drawings was used (in boldly colored variations) on the cover of the August, 1967 issue (#9) of the San Francisco Oracle. He also made collages made from 19th-century engraving images, which he first exhibited as The Dennis Hopper One Man Show.

He also made a number of short films in the mid-1960s in addition to Report and Vivian. These include Ten Second Film (1965), an advertisement for the New York Film Festival that was rejected as being "too fast;" Breakaway (1966), featuring music sung by and danced to by Toni Basil; The White Rose (1967), documenting the removal of fellow artist Jay DeFeo's magnum opus from her San Francisco apartment, with Miles Davis's Sketches of Spain as the soundtrack; and Looking for Mushrooms (1967), a three-minute color wild ride with the Beatles' "Tomorrow Never Knows" as the soundtrack. (In 1996 he created a longer version of the film, setting it to music by Terry Riley). In 1966, Dennis Hopper invited Conner to the location shoot for Cool Hand Luke; the artist shot the proceedings in 85mm, revisiting this footage in 2004 to create his film Luke.

During the 1970s Conner focused on drawing and photography, including many photos of the late 1970s West Coast punk rock scene. A 1978 film used Devo's "Mongoloid" as a soundtrack. Conner in the 1970s also created along with photographer Edmund Shea a series of life-size photograms called Angels. Conner would pose in front of large pieces of photo paper, which after being exposed to light and then developed produced images of Conner's body in white against a dark background. Throne Angel, in the collection of the Honolulu Museum of Art, is an example with the artist crouching on a stool. Conner also began to draw elaborately folded inkblots.

In the 1980s and 1990s Conner continued to work on collages, including ones using religious imagery, and inkblot drawings that have been shown in numerous exhibitions, including the 1997 Whitney Biennial. Throughout Conner's entire body of work, the recurrence of religious imagery and symbology continues to underscore the essentially visionary nature of his work. 'May the Heart of the Tin Woodsman be with You from 1981, in the collection of the Honolulu Museum of Art, is an example of the artist's collages that are both mystical and symbolic. It is an engraving collage, with glue, melted plastic and charred wood.

In 1999, to accompany a traveling exhibition, a major monograph of his work was published by the Walker Art Center, titled 2000 BC: The Bruce Conner Story, Part II. The exhibition, which featured specially built in-gallery screening rooms for Conner's films as well as selected assemblages, felt-tip pen and inkblot drawings, engraving collages, photograms, and conceptual pieces, was seen at the Walker, the Modern Art Museum in Fort Worth, the de Young in San Francisco, and the Museum of Contemporary Art in Los Angeles.

=== Late career (c. 2000 to 2008) ===
Conner announced his retirement at the time of the "2000 BC" exhibition, but in fact continued to make art until shortly before his death. However, much of this work, including in particular the many inkblot drawings he made, including a series responding to 9/11, were presented using pseudonyms or the name "Anonymous." Conner also made collages from old engravings, and completed (depending on how they are counted) three or four experimental films. He also used computer-based graphics programs to translate older engraving collages into large-sized woven tapestries, and made paper-based prints in that way as well. Various other artistic projects were completed as well, including in the year of his death a large assemblage titled King. Conner also in late 2007 directed and approved an outdoor installation of a large painting, resulting in what one observer suggested is a final work-in-progress.

== Films ==
His innovative technique of skillfully montaged shots from pre-existing borrowed or found footage can be seen in his first film A Movie (1958). His subsequent films are most often fast-paced collages of found footage or of footage shot by Conner; however, he made numerous films, including Crossroads, his 30-plus-minute meditation on the atom bomb, that are almost achingly deliberate in their pace.

Conner was among the first to use pop music for film soundtracks. His films are now considered to be the precursors of the music video genre. They have inspired other filmmakers, such as Conner's friend Dennis Hopper, who said, “Bruce’s movies changed my entire concept of editing. In fact, much of the editing of Easy Rider came directly from watching Bruce’s films."

Conner's works are often metamedia in nature, offering commentary and critique on the media — especially television and its advertisements — and its effect on American culture and society. His film Report (1967) which features repetitive, found footage of the Kennedy assassination paired with a soundtrack of radio broadcasts of the event and consumerist and other imagery — including the film's final image of a close-up of a "Sell" button — may be the Conner film with the most visceral impact. Bruce Jenkins wrote that Report "perfectly captures Conner's anger over the commercialization of Kennedy's death" while also examining the media's mythic construction of JFK and Jackie — a hunger for images that "guaranteed that they would be transformed into idols, myths, Gods."

Conner's collaborations with musicians include Devo (Mongoloid), Terry Riley (Looking for Mushrooms (long version) and Easter Morning), Patrick Gleeson and Terry Riley (Crossroads), Brian Eno and David Byrne (America is Waiting, Mea Culpa) and three more films with Gleeson (Take the 5:10 to Dreamland, Television Assassination, and Luke). His film of dancer and choreographer Toni Basil, Breakaway (1966), featured a song recorded by Basil.

== Prints and tapestries ==
Conner also continued to work on editioned prints and tapestries during the last 10 years of his life. These works often used digital technology to revisit earlier imagery and themes; for example, his Jacquard tapestry editions, created in collaboration with Donald Farnsworth of Magnolia Editions in Oakland, CA, were translated from digitally manipulated scans of small-scale paper collages, made in the 1990s from engraving illustrations from Bible stories.

== Death ==
Conner, who had twice announced his own death as a conceptual art event or prank, died on July 7, 2008, and was survived by his wife, American artist Jean Sandstedt Conner, and his son, Robert.

== Archives ==
The Bruce Conner papers are held by the Bancroft Library at the University of California, Berkeley. Conner's film Crossroads was preserved by the Academy Film Archive, in conjunction with the Pacific Film Archive, in 1995.

== Bruce Conner: It's All True (2016 Retrospective Exhibition) ==
In July 2016, It's All True, a career-spanning retrospective of Conner's work co-organized by the San Francisco Museum of Modern Art and New York's Museum of Modern Art, opened at the latter institution. Roberta Smith of The New York Times called the exhibition an "extravaganza" and "a massive tribute, with some 250 works in nearly 10 media." Smith described Conner as a "polymathic nonconformist" who was "one of the great outliers of American Art" and "fearlessly evolved into one of America’s first thoroughly multidisciplinary artists." Poet and critic John Yau, writing in Hyperallergic, suggested that Conner "possessed the third or inner eye, meaning he was capable of microscopic and macroscopic vision, of delving into the visceral while attaining a state of illumination." J. Hoberman, in the New York Review of Books, focused on Conner’s movies, including Crossroads (1976), assembled from previously classified government footage of the 1946 Bikini Atoll atomic bomb test, which is shown in its own room in the exhibition. That film, Hoberman wrote, “seems like an exemplary—and rare—instance of twentieth-century religious art” for which “[t]he word ‘awe-inspiring’ barely communicates the cumulative sense of wonder and dread” experienced while watching it.

It's All True opened at the San Francisco Museum of Modern Art on October 29, 2016, with some 85 works added to those seen at New York's Museum of Modern Art. San Francisco Chronicle critic Charles Demarais observed that there were "something like 18 discrete galleries" in the show and "that virtually every room seems to contain at least one masterwork.". He also called it "the best art museum exhibition of 2016, brilliantly unraveling the complex and conflicting personae of the Bay Area’s most important all-around artist". Critic Kenneth Baker concluded that the "apocalyptic and psychedelic qualities" of Conner's work "play well against the shrill vulgarity, social desperation and economic cruelty of current domestic and world affairs. It lends the show an uncanny timeliness.". Artist Julia Couzens wrote that it was a "staggering exhibition" in which "[t]he viewer walks into a searching, visionary world of masquerades, dark desire, mordant wit and spiritual transcendence.". Remarking on the exhibition, artist Sarah Hotchkiss called Conner's career "fascinating and enduringly salient" and offered that it was difficult to write about his practice in "both a concise and comprehensive way" because "[t]here's just so much there there.".

== Filmography ==
- A Movie (1958)
- Cosmic Ray (1961)
- Vivian (1964)
- Ten Second Film (1965)
- Easter Morning Raga (1966)
- Breakaway (1966)
- Report (1963–1967)
- The White Rose (1967)
- Looking for Mushrooms (1967)
- Permian Strata (1969)
- Marilyn Times Five (1973)
- Crossroads (1976)
- Take the 5:10 to Dreamland (1976)
- Valse Triste (1977)
- Mongoloid (1978)
- Mea Culpa (1981)
- America is Waiting (1982)
- Television Assassination (1995)
- Looking for Mushrooms (long version, 1996)
- Luke (2004)
- Eve-Ray-Forever (three screen installation) (2006)
- Three Screen Ray (three screen installation) (2006)
- His Eye is on the Sparrow (2006)
- Easter Morning (2008)

== Exhibition ==
- 2010: Les Rencontres d'Arles festival, France;
- 2014: Crossroads & Works on Paper, November 8 – December 20, Kohn Gallery, Los Angeles, CA
- 2014: Inherent Vice: This is Not a Bruce Conner Exhibition, January 18 – April 27, di Rosa, Napa, CA
- 2015: Bruce Conner: Somebody Else's Prints , February 13 – May 16, San Jose Institute of Contemporary Art, San Jose, CA
- 2016: Bruce Conner: It's All True, July 3–October 2, 2016, The Museum of Modern Art
- 2016-17: Bruce Conner: It's All True, October 29, 2016 – January 22, 2017, San Francisco Museum of Modern Art
- 2017: Bruce Conner: It's All True, February 22, 2017 – May 22, 2017, Museo Nacional Centro de Arte Reina Sofía
- 2021: Stations: Some Recent Acquisitions, January 8, 2021 – April 11, 2021, Morris and Helen Belkin Art Gallery, Vancouver, BC
- 2022: Bruce Conner: Light of Darkness, October 8, 2022 – March 5, 2023, Fundació Antoni Tàpies

== Contributions ==
2008 Life on Mars, the 2008 Carnegie International

== Selected bibliography ==
- Sophie Dannenmüller: "Bruce Conner et les Rats de l'Art", Les Cahiers du Musée national d'art moderne, Editions du Centre Pompidou, Paris, n° 107, avril 2009, p. 52-75. (text in French)
- 2000 BC: The Bruce Conner Story Part II. Exh. cat. edited by Joan Rothfuss. Contributions by Kathy Halbreich, Bruce Jenkins, Peter Boswell. Walker Art Center, Minneapolis 1999.
- Bruce Conner: In the Estheticization of Violence, by Frederic Colier, 2002, Book Case Engine
- Rogers, Holly and Jeremy Barham: The Music and Sound of Experimental Film, New York: Oxford University Press, 2017.
