= Crossroads (1976 film) =

- Directed by: Bruce Conner
- Music by: Patrick Gleeson; Terry Riley
- Release date: 1976
- Running time: 36 minutes
- Country: United States

Crossroads is a 1976 short film directed by Bruce Conner. It features 37 minutes of extreme slow-motion replays of the July 25, 1946 Operation Crossroads Baker underwater nuclear test at Bikini Atoll in the Pacific. The event was captured for research purposes by five hundred cameras stationed on unmanned planes, high-altitude aircraft, boats near the blast, and from more distant points on land around the Atoll. The location was selected in part because the network of islands formed an almost complete ellipse around the detonation site, allowing for a comprehensive documentation of the event from numerous angles. The music is by Patrick Gleeson and Terry Riley.

== Summary ==
The first section of the film is coupled with an apparently synchronous on-location soundtrack that includes realistic syntheses of bird-sounds, a distant jeep, waves lapping on the beach and human voices. It is not initially evident that these sounds are not authentically tied to the images they accompany. Conner first allows doubt of his simulation when he breaks the sound delay displacement to set the sound of the blast "in sync" with the visual event. In the first shots of the film, the blast is heard moments after it is seen. This accounts for the disparity between the speeds of light and sound. Having the visual and sonic events occur simultaneously, which is to say out of what would be actual sync, makes the depiction an aesthetic simulation of the event rather than a document of an actual one. This choice serves as a deliberate cinematizing of its content.

== Preservation ==
The Academy Film Archive, in conjunction with the Pacific Film Archive preserved Crossroads in 1995.
