= Report (film) =

- Directed by: Bruce Conner
- Release date: 1967
- Running time: 13 minutes
- Country: United States
- Language: English

Report is a 1967 short (13 minute), avant-garde film by Bruce Conner. It consists of found footage concerning the assassination of United States President John F. Kennedy.

== Summary ==
A two-part meditation on the John F. Kennedy assassination that also dissects the phenomenon of the news media as a means of processing the event with recordings of said assassination and other imagery created as a method by Bruce Conner to show the effect Kennedy's death had on the public and the media.

== Legacy ==
It is listed in the book 1001 Movies You Must See Before You Die.

== See also ==
- List of American films of 1967
- JFK (film)
