= Marilyn Times Five =

- Directed by: Bruce Conner
- Starring: Arline Hunter
- Release date: 1973
- Running time: 14 minutes
- Country: United States
- Language: English

Marilyn Times Five is a 1973 experimental film by American filmmaker Bruce Conner.

== Plot ==
It is an exploration of how a film's form can influence audience perception of the content of film. An image of a female is looped several times. With each repetition, the content looses some of its emotional charge until the viewer experiences visual exhaustion.

For this film, the footage comes from Apple Knockers and Coke, a famous porno loop from the late '40s featuring Monroe look-alike Arline Hunter while the song "I'm Through With Love" by Marilyn herself is playing.

== See also ==
- 1973 in film
- Pop art
- Found object
