= A Movie =

1958 experimental collage film directed by Bruce Conner

- The title cards from A Movie
- Directed by: Bruce Conner
- Release date: June 10, 1958
- Running time: 12 minutes
- Country: United States
- Language: English
- Budget: $350

A Movie (styled as A MOVIE) is a 1958 experimental collage film by American artist Bruce Conner. It combines pieces of found footage taken from various sources such as newsreels, soft-core pornography, and B movies, all set to a score featuring Ottorino Respighi's Pines of Rome.

The film is recognized as a landmark work in American experimental cinema, particularly as an early example of found footage. A Movie was selected for preservation in the National Film Registry in 1994.

== Content ==
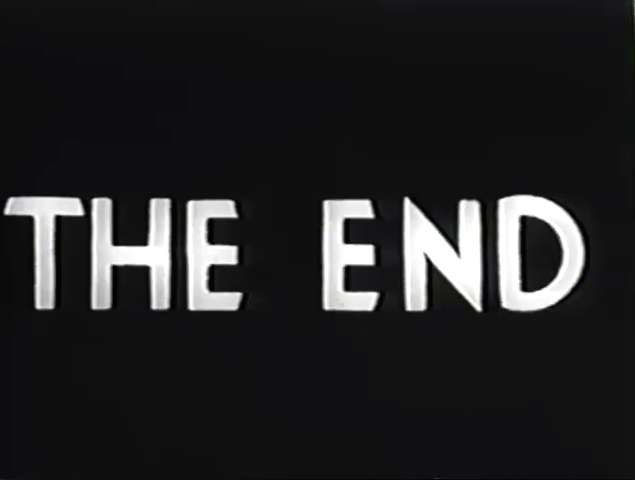
A Movie has multiple false endings announced in its intertitles.

A Movie opens with its longest shot, an extended production credit with Bruce Conner's name. After the opening credits, the countdown leader is interrupted by a shot of an undressed woman removing her stockings. Once the countdown completes, an intertitle falsely announces "The End" of the film. The film moves into a montage of cavalry, tanks, race cars, and a charging elephant.

Another false ending precedes footage of zeppelins and tightrope walkers. In one well-known sequence, a man in a submarine looks through a periscope to see a woman posing in a bikini, leading to the launch of a torpedo and a mushroom cloud. This leads to water sporting accidents and racing mishaps. As the musical score swells, a succession of violent scenes ensues, including aerial bombings, the Hindenburg disaster, and firing squads. The film closes with a scuba diver exploring a shipwreck.

== Background ==
Bruce Conner developed the concept for A Movie many years before he began working on it. He was inspired early on by a battle scene in the Marx Brothers' Duck Soup that builds a montage from stock footage. He envisioned a film combining images and sounds from many different movies and, when watching movies, often imagined possible sequences that could be created from them.

Conner and Larry Jordan began the Camera Obscura Film Society during the late 1950s. Conner was interested in the film leader used by projectionists that went unseen by the audience. He had a filmstrip given to him by writer Lee Streiff which showed a nude woman, and he thought about inserting the strip in the countdown leader at a Camera Obscura screening of Triumph of the Will. When Jordan found out about the plan, he threatened to quit the society. Conner decided that the only way for him to carry out this vision would be to insert such a sequence in a film of his own.

== Production ==
Jordan showed Conner how to edit film and offered him the use of a Griswold film splicer. Describing cinema as "a rich man's art form", Conner looked to store-bought footage as an economical alternative to shooting original material. He purchased a condensed Hopalong Cassidy western, a short novelty film called Thrills and Spills, a Castle home movie containing German propaganda, and a newsreel compilation titled Headlines of 1953.

Conner primarily worked in assemblage at the time, and he originally planned to use the film as part of an installation piece. The installation would fill a 10-foot (3.0 m) cube into which people could walk. The film would have no soundtrack; instead, the installation would play the film as a loop with sound coming from tape players, radio, and television. However, Conner was not able to fulfill his original vision. The cost of a rear projection machine for the installation was prohibitively expensive.

"Pines of the Villa Borghese"
A performance of the first movement of Pines of Rome (1924)

He decided to make the film a stand-alone work and edited the segments together using a radio to time them. During one editing session, Respighi's Pines of Rome came on the radio and synced well with the ending. Pines of Rome had been used ten years earlier by Kenneth Anger for his avant-garde short film Fireworks. Conner made a recording from the first, second, and fourth movements and added the music to the completed image track. He was unsure how to clear the rights to the music and used the recording without authorization. He completed the film on a budget of $350 (equivalent to $3,906 in 2025).

== Release ==
A Movie premiered June 10, 1958, at the East and West Gallery in San Francisco. It was part of a reception for Conner's first solo art show. Shortly after, the film was acquired for distribution by Cinema 16 in New York. When local distributor Canyon Cinema emerged in the early 1960s, A Movie was one of its more well-known offerings.

== Legacy ==
At its 1960 Creative Film Awards Presentation, the Creative Film Foundation gave A Movie an Award of Distinction, with Michael McClure describing its comedy "not [as] a free laugh but the reconstruction of human depth, achievement and emotion". It has gone on to be recognized as a landmark piece of avant-garde cinema. In 1994, A Movie was selected for preservation in the United States National Film Registry by the Library of Congress as being "culturally, historically, or aesthetically significant".

Filmmaker Peter Hutton has cited A Movie as an influence on his work. Artist Christian Marclay first saw the film as a student, and it influenced his own practice of appropriating materials and establishing new connections between them. Alan Berliner's 1985 film Everywhere at Once uses Pines of Rome for its soundtrack in an homage to A Movie. Jennifer Proctor remade it in 2010 as A Movie by Jen Proctor. Her digital remake follows the original nearly shot for shot, using footage downloaded from YouTube and LiveLeak.

== See also ==
- List of avant-garde films of the 1950s
- Blonde Cobra
- Rose Hobart

== Bibliography ==
- Aitken, Doug (2006). Broken Screen: 26 Conversations with Doug Aitken. Distributed Art Publishers. ISBN 978-1-933045-26-9.
- Conner, Bruce (2010). "How I Invented Electricity". In Anker, Steve; Geritz, Kathy; Seid, Steve (eds.). Radical Light: Alternative Film and Video in the San Francisco Bay Area, 1945–2000. University of California Press. ISBN 978-0-520-24911-0.
- Frieling, Rudolf; Garrels, Gary, eds. (2016). Bruce Conner: It's All True. San Francisco Museum of Modern Art. ISBN 978-0-520-29056-3.
- MacDonald, Scott (1998). A Critical Cinema 3: Interviews with Independent Filmmakers. University of California Press. ISBN 978-0-520-20943-5.
- MacDonald, Scott (2006). A Critical Cinema 5: Interviews with Independent Filmmakers. University of California Press. ISBN 978-0-520-93908-0.
- MacDonald, Scott (2008). Canyon Cinema: The Life and Times of an Independent Film Distributor. University of California Press. ISBN 978-0-520-94061-1.
- Piranio, Michelle, ed. (1999). 2000 BC: The Bruce Conner Story Part II. Walker Art Center. ISBN 978-0-935640-61-8.
- Sterritt, David (2013). "Wrenching Departures: Mortality and Absurdity in Avant-Garde Film". In Pomerance, Murray (ed.). The Last Laugh: Strange Humors of Cinema. Wayne State University Press. ISBN 978-0-8143-3855-1.
- Vogel, Amos (2002). "Program Notes Compiled by Amos Vogel for the 1960 Creative Film Awards Presentation, in January 1961". In MacDonald, Scott (ed.). Cinema 16: Documents Toward a History of the Film Society. Temple University Press. ISBN 978-1-4399-0530-2.
- Wees, William C. (1993). Recycled Images: The Art and Politics of Found Footage Films. Anthology Film Archives. ISBN 978-0-911689-19-8.
- Zimmermann, Patricia R.; MacDonald, Scott (2017). The Flaherty: Decades in the Cause of Independent Cinema. Indiana University Press. ISBN 978-0-253-02688-0.
