= Devore, San Bernardino =

Unincorporated community in California, United States

Devore
- Neighborhood
- Devore Heights
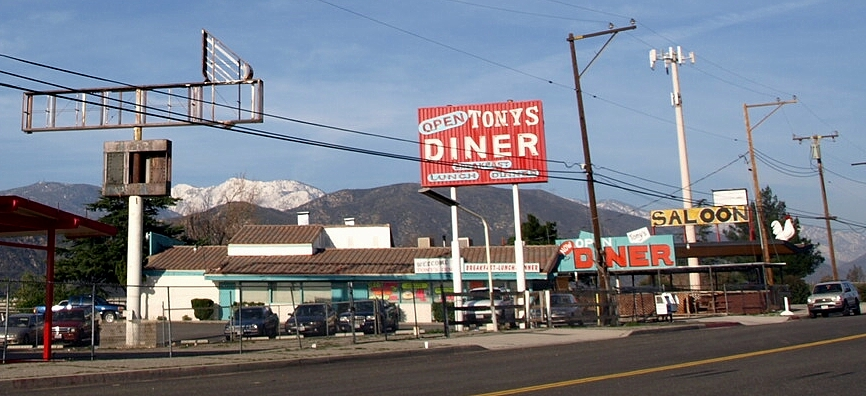
- Roadside business in Devore along former historic U.S. Route 66 (Cajon Boulevard)

- Location within the state of California Devore (the United States)
- Coordinates: 34°12′59″N 117°24′05″W
- Country: United States
- State: California
- County: San Bernardino County
- City: San Bernardino
- Elevation: 2,510 ft (770 m)
- Time zone: UTC-8 (Pacific (PST))
  - Summer (DST): UTC-7 (PDT)
- ZIP codes: 92407
- Area codes: 909 and 840
- GNIS feature ID: 270868

Devore Heights, or Devore, is a residential rural neighborhood of the city of San Bernardino, California. It is located just north of the junction of Interstate 15 and Interstate 215, about 12 miles northwest of downtown San Bernardino. It is also the last town to pass through before taking the Cajon Pass to reach Hesperia, California. The area is just outside the boundaries of the San Bernardino National Forest; nearby cities and communities include Verdemont, University Hills, Rancho Cucamonga, Fontana, and Rialto. Glen Helen Pavilion/Amphitheater, the largest amphitheater in North America, is located just south of Devore. Devore is completely within the city's 92407 ZIP Code and is within the 909 and 840 area codes as well.

== History ==
Devore, in the northernmost corner of the original Rancho Muscupiabe in Township 2 North, Range 5 West, is an unincorporated community north of San Bernardino City in San Bernardino County bordering the San Bernardino National Forest in the foothills of the San Bernardino Mountain Range between Cajon Pass and valley cities. It also includes several pieces of private property that border the Muscupiabe Rancho within the National Forest.

The San Andreas Fault runs through the hills in the upper end of Devore. In Cajon Creek/Wash below Devore run the Glen Helen and San Jacinto Faults. Ground water barriers exist between the San Andreas and Glen Helen Faults. Other earthquake rifts, like the Peters Fault, also rumble in Devore on occasion.

The name changed a few times, from El Cajon de Muscupiabe to Rancho Muscupiabe (both names were being used during the 1858 survey) to The Martin District (1887) to The Guernsey Tract (1895) to The Glen Helen Tract (1901) to Kenwood Heights (1903), and finally to Devore a year or so later. For years residents called Devore “The Southern Portal of the Cajon Pass”.

Michael White, who had arrived in the US in 1817, received the Muscupiabe grant in 1842. He had become a Mexican citizen by then, had married a prominent Hispanic maiden, the daughter of Eulalie Perez, and his Spanish name was Don Miguel Blanco. He was situated in Cable Canyon, and his job was to watch the pass for horse-thieving Indians. He quit-claimed half the Rancho to A.P. Crittenden of San Francisco and Isabella Granger of Los Angeles County in 1855. Two years later, the Whites sold the remaining half to Henry Hancock, the L.A. County deputy surveyor, who had originally surveyed the Rancho.

Kenwood Corporation, a clothing manufacturer specializing in railroad uniforms, was located in the ritzy part of Chicago and in Delaware. A high-ranking official, possibly vice president, John A. Devore was sent to Southern California in 1901 at the age of 42 to cement relationships with the railroads. He was accompanied by his wife, Anna, and her brother, Walter Evans. Devore bought land from John and Nettie (Hawley) Cole, who had a 294.68-acre Jersey dairy in the hills at the top of Kimbark Ave., and 1394 acres from John M.C. and Elizabeth Marble of Los Angeles.

In 1902, the Kenwood Corporation contracted with Chicago Title and Trust Company to mortgage the Devore property for $560,000 and to issue 2800 bonds worth $200 each. They were to be paid to the “investors” at a rate of $1.50 on the first and 15th of each month for 36 months. The Kenwood Commercial Company agreed to plant, cultivate, and maintain orchards and vineyards on the lands with trees and vines and crops most suitable to the climate and most profitable to the company. Kenwood Commercial Company filed for bankruptcy in Illinois on August 9, 1904, and for $1,000, the land of the Kenwood Company was deeded to John A. Devore in 1905. Robert N.C. Wilson and H.A. Barclay represented the California Southern Railroad Company since the deed of transfer to John Devore excluded the railroad right of way. An additional deed in 1906 transferred from Walter Evans, M.L. Cook, H.L. and J.H. and M.D. and C.H. Allison, F.S. Scheuer, and J.S. Bright, Jr. to John A. Devore many of the placer mining claims.

Devore died young in 1907. John Devore's vision for the land that now bears his name was evidently for a place of grace and beauty, and authors of his time lauded him for the lovely homes, rock walls, and gardens he had incorporated into the design of the community. Much of his effort was destroyed by the Flood of 1938.

By the end of 1910, the R.W. Poindexter Company of Los Angeles had transferred most of the Devore/Thomas land to Thomas S. Wadsworth, C.W. Hollister, J.A. Crandall, and Walter W. Brown, and the Devore Land Company was established. Anna (Devore) Thomas and William Thomas deeded to Title Insurance and Trust Co. of L.A. portions in Sections 21 and 22, as well as 20.

McGroarty in his 1914 History of Southern California says, “Devore is a station on the Santa Fe Railroad, nine miles north of San Bernardino, near the center of a new territory skirting the foothills. (The Devore Depot was the largest, most ornate of the stations built along the Cajon Pass track for fuel and water stops for the train engines.)

La Fuze in her 1971 Saga of the San Bernardinos described early Devore as a thousand-acre bench showplace producing grapes, apples, peaches, pears, (and plums).

In the 1950s, maps showed Devore on the lower lands, from Cajon Blvd. to Glen Helen, and Devore Heights was on the hill. With the land-grabs by San Bernardino and the I15 freeway so successful, not much of Devore is left except Devore Heights.

The area in the foothills of the ranges is composed of alluvial flows, which leave behind many canyons from where the flows originated. Canyons in Devore are often named after “original” landowners or those who came later and changed the names. Cable Canyon was named for the two Cable brothers who had a ranch there and were active in local politics during the 1870s.

Hopper Canyon was named for Henry and Julia (Akers) Hopper, who settled in the area with their seven children. Akers Canyon, now one of the Kimbarks, was named for Julia's father Larkin B. Akers, or Frank (who married Charlotte Swarthout) or John M. Akers, who also farmed in Martin District in the late 1800s. The three traded land among them.

Middleman Falls was named after a New York farmer who settled in the area and was registered to vote in 1886. His name, James Petty Medlin, was mispronounced thereafter as Middleman. Medlin was rich in water rights, but that might have led to his murder in 1895. His land was sold at auction in 1906 for $81.25 to D. Walter Evans, brother of Anna Devore.

Wilson Creek took its name from Robert N.C. Wilson, who was dealing in land (including Glen Helen) and water all through the Pass in 1883 and became part of the Muscoy Water Company. This “invisible” man left little paper trail.

Pittman Canyon was named for Dr. Henderson Pittman, who bought his (now Mathews) property in 1913. Ames Canyon was named for settler Robert Earl Ames, who came with the Mormons and stayed. Swarthout (farmers and transporters) and Cleghorn (lumber cutters) are also names of early settlers, as was John Hansen (now E. Kimbark).

Devore has been composed of fiercely independent residents who have valued solitude, privacy, the rural lifestyle, and appreciation of nature, both wild and domesticated, whether that is the way its founders intended or not—or whether that’s the way it stays. Others move to Devore because its relative remoteness is conducive to concealing activities and lifestyles that would not be accepted in town.

Most of the mine claims filed were more practical than golden dreams: asbestos, calcite, talc, and clay. John Devore bought some placer claims to expand his land holdings, but he also bought claims for calcite.

Portland Cement was shipped from Europe until about 1904, so people had to mine calcite (lime) and make their own building materials. The kilns in the Kimbark Canyons were especially useful then. There was probably another kiln near the railroad tracks, as well as the one in Keenbrook.

Theodore and Harriet Walker, property dealers in Los Angeles bought over half of Devore in 1915. Mr. and Mrs. R.K. Walker, relatives of Theodore and Harriet also bought some Devore land, including the Devore Ranch and house. Mrs. R.K. Walker lived there for years and made a name for herself in flower and produce shows. Robert B. Peters, whose wife Florence was the daughter of the Theodore Walkers, also became involved in buying Devore land as early as 1915. He and his wife owned considerable property in Devore and lived in the big Devore house. After managing the ranch for several years for the R.K. Walkers, R.B. Peters bought it from Mrs. R.K. Walker, whose husband and two partners had purchased the ranch. Peters also was instrumental in the formation of the Mesa Alta Orange Company, a large landholder in Devore from 1928 to 1940.

Devore Land Company, a corporation based in Los Angeles, deeded all its water rights in Devore to the Devore Water Company on June 17, 1904, and additional rights were deeded on December 19, 1911. Devore Water Company still exists as a rare municipal water producer.

=== Devore Depot ===
The Devore Station, a concrete and rock structure, was sturdier and more ornate than most of the other train stations on the Cajon Pass run, which were made of wood. The Devore Depot, a two-story building designed by architect Harrison Allbright, was used between 1908 and 1930. It was demolished around 1958. The upstairs office was used by Station Master Herbert B. Davis and his wife Jennie Cook Davis, postmistress and well-known local poet. Photos available in Devore, A Scrapbook.

== Education ==
Devore is served by the San Bernardino City Unified School District. Devore is home to Kimbark Elementary, a 2016 California Gold Ribbon School. While no middle or high schools are located within the neighborhood, the nearby neighborhoods of Verdemont and University Hills have a middle school and high school, respectively. Kimbark School opened in 1968. It was preceded by Cajon School just south of Devore Road on Cajon Blvd. Cajon School, one large room that could be divided into two by a sliding wall, was built in 1924 of native rocks by residents of Devore on land donated by R. B. Peters, one of the community's most illustrious residents. A four room wing was added in 1949 to accommodate students through sixth grade. That Cajon School was preceded by an earlier one on the other side of Cajon Blvd. which functioned from 1870 to 1921, when the Cajon School District was annexed by San Bernardino.

== Local attractions ==
Glen Helen Amphitheater (also known as Glen Helen Pavilion or G.H. Amphitheater), is a local, open-air venue that hosts many music festivals and performances. Originally designed and opened in 1982 by Steve Wozniak, and with a maximum capacity of 65,000 people, it is the largest open-air amphitheater on the continent; generally, most amphitheaters accommodate anywhere from 10,000 to 25,000 people, making G.H. Pavilion more than double the average capacity. The orchestra, box and loge sections can seat up to 10,902 people, with the lawn section at the back fitting an additional 54,098.

Mountain High is a ski resort in Wrightwood that is open during the colder months for snow sports, including skiing and snowboarding.

Local attractions of Devore
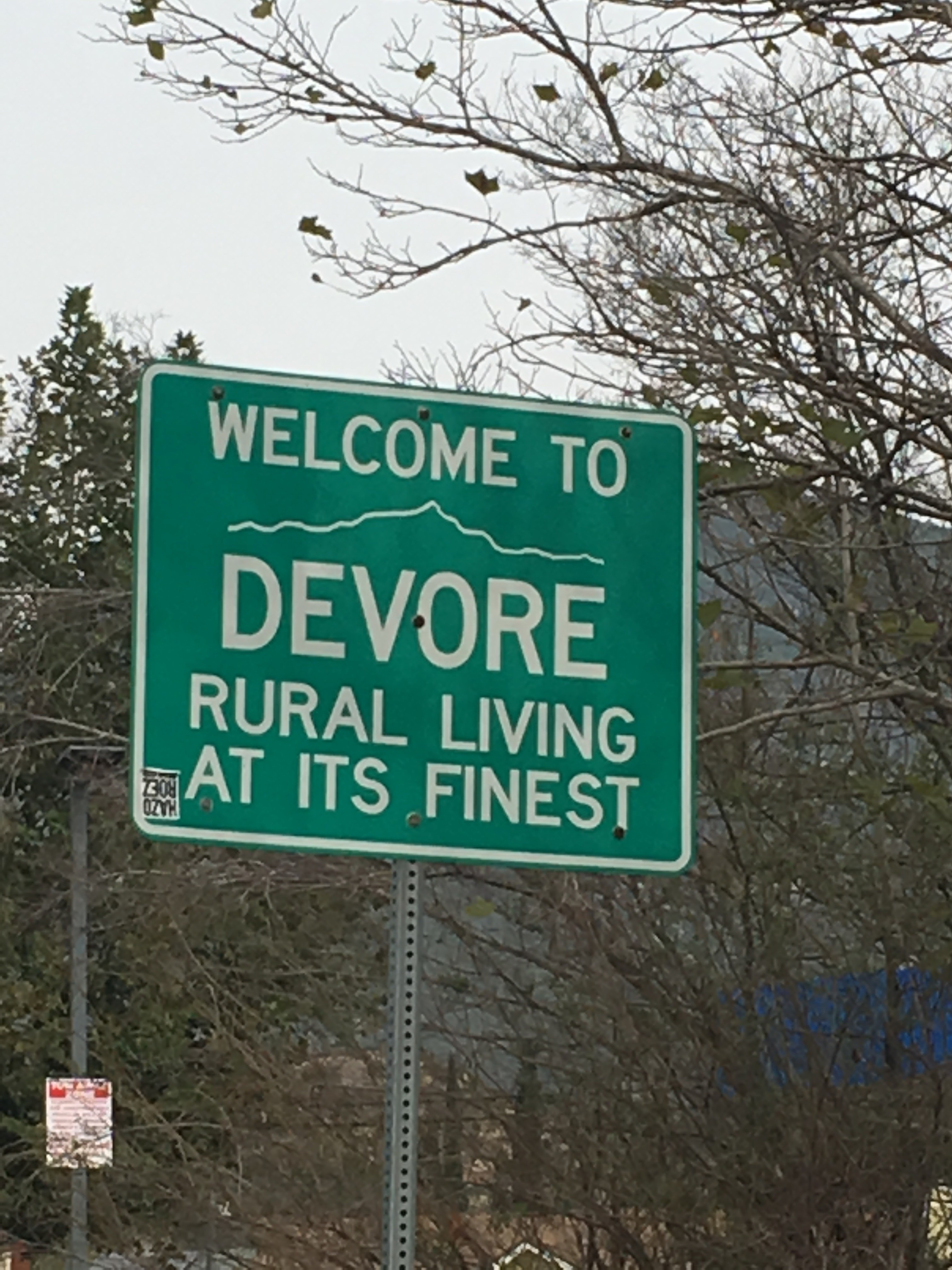
Devore City Sign

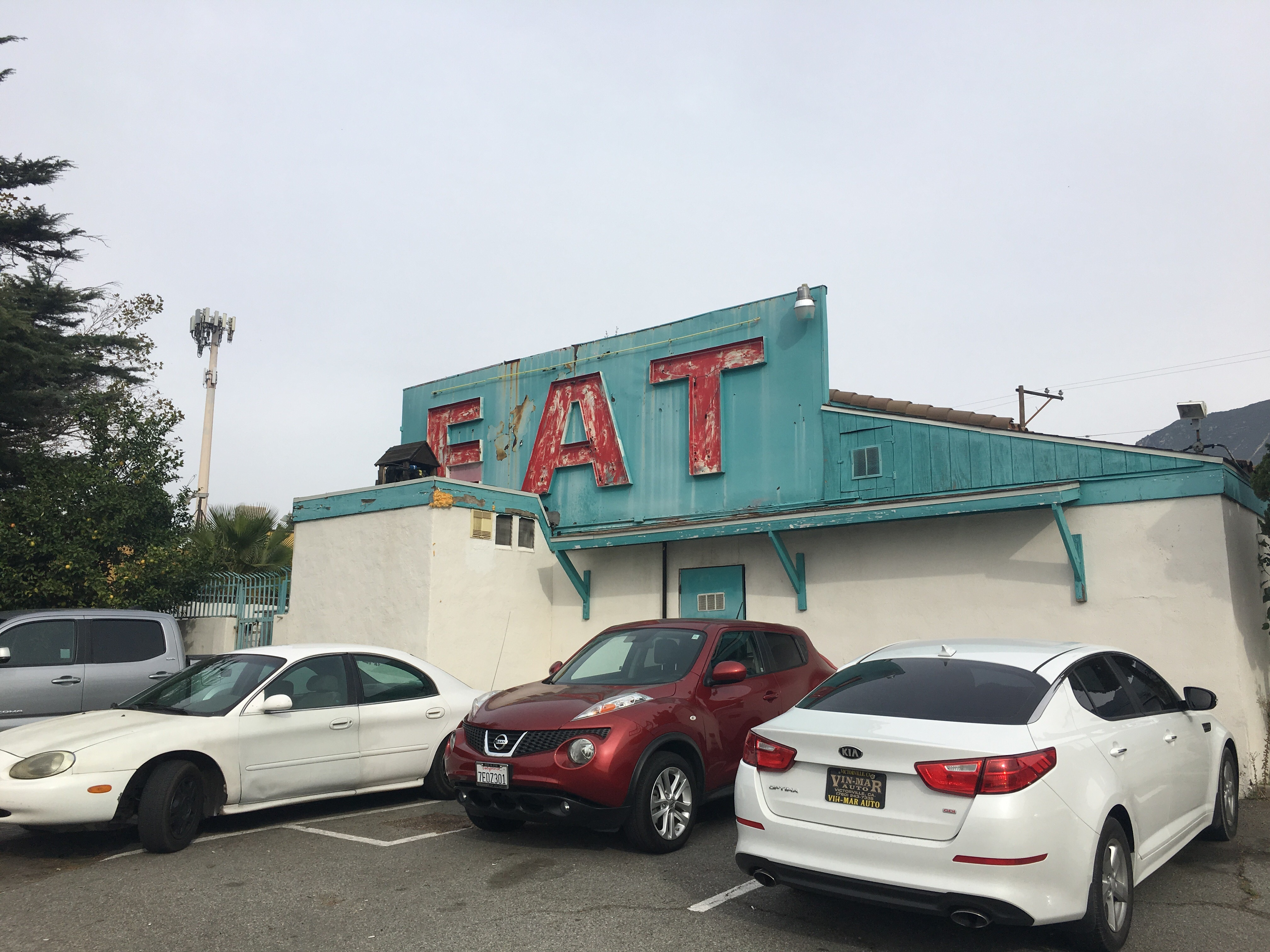
Papa Tony's Diner

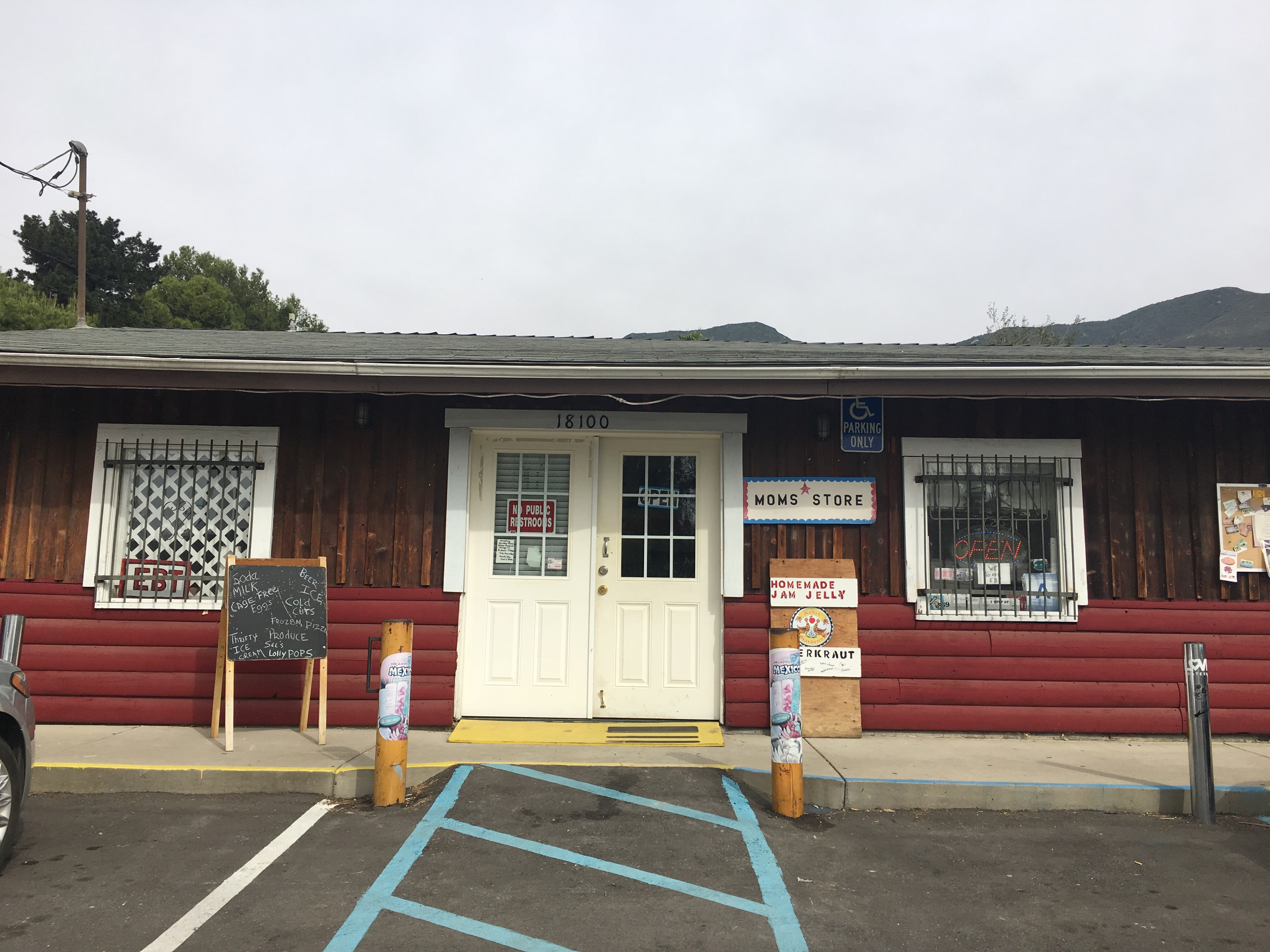
Mom's Country Store

== The Old Fire ==
Devore suffered from a fire on October 25, 2003. The fire began at Waterman Canyon around 9:00 A.M and by 6:30 P.M the fire had grown up to 10,000 acres. The fire burned 91,281 acres, destroyed 940 residences, 30 commercial buildings and 300 outbuildings. More than 4,000 firefighters were called in effort to put this fire out. The Old Fire grew and spread towards the San Bernardino Mountains. The Old Fire grew so big that it merged with another existing fire, the Grand Prix Fire, across the Interstate 15 Freeway. Combined, these fires caused damage that spanned more than 30 miles wide. When this fire hit Devore, the city was still recovering from the Panorama Fire from November 1980 which had burned 23,800 acres. The Old Fire resulted in 6 deaths and evacuation of over 70,000 citizens.
