= Blair Park, San Bernardino =

- Neighborhood community
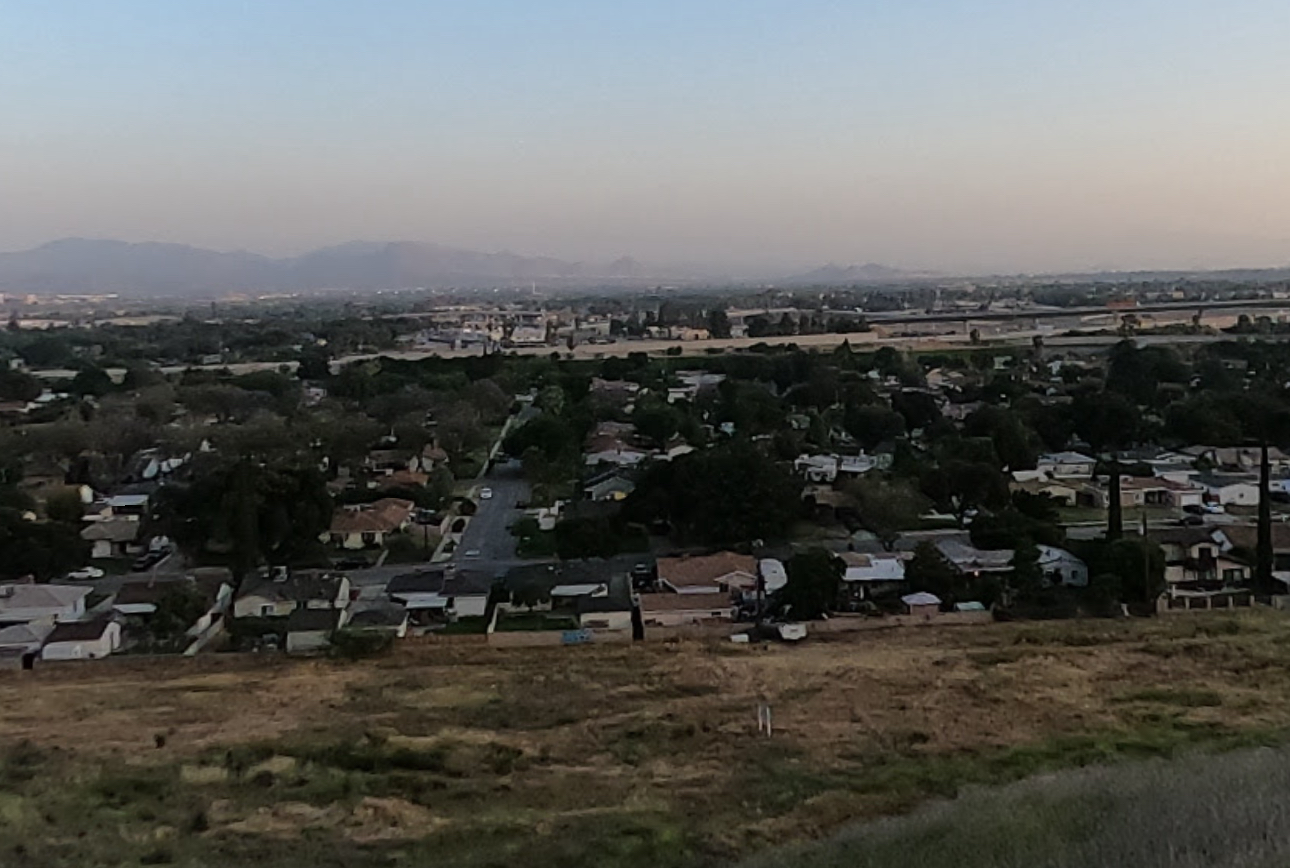
- View of West Blair Park
- Nicknames: BP, Blair
- Location of the Blair Park, San Bernardino in California
- Coordinates: 34°10′44″N 117°19′37″W
- Country: United States
- State: California
- County: San Bernardino
- City: San Bernardino
- Elevation: 1,486 ft (453 m)

Population (2024)
  - Total: 6,270
- Time zone: UTC-8 (PST)
  - Summer (DST): UTC-7 (PDT)

Blair Park is a neighborhood in the city of San Bernardino, California. Like most neighborhoods in San Bernardino, the boundaries are informal; by common usage, Blair Park is bounded on the west by the 215 freeway; on the east by E street; on the south by the 210 freeway;and on the north by the Shandin Hills. Its main commercial streets are 30th street, Little Mountain Drive and E street.

== Geography ==
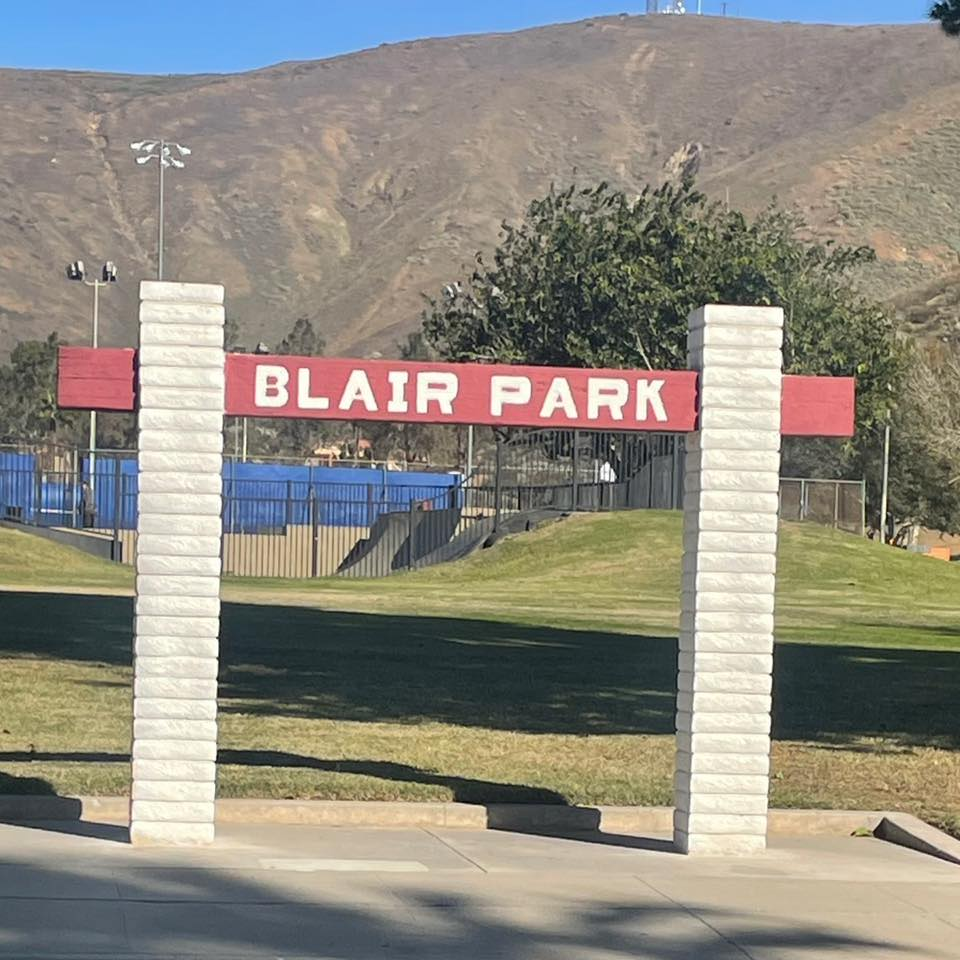
Sign at Blair Park with the Shandin Hills visible in the background

Blair Park is located 5 miles (8.0 km) north of downtown San Bernardino in San Bernardino County, California. The elevation ranges from 1,221 to 1,900 feet, and it is in the Pacific Time Zone (UTC-8, UTC-7 in the summer). Blair Park is completely within the Riverside - San Bernardino Metropolitan Area of California, the 2nd largest in the state, and the 12th largest in the nation. Blair Park is made up of large, mature trees and consists of many hills. The neighborhood is home to a 34 acre park of the same name with 3 baseball diamonds and a skatepark.

== Transportation ==
San Bernardino city is a member of the joint-powers authority Omnitrans, this includes Blair Park. The San Bernardino Express (sbX) Green Line, a bus rapid transit system, runs from its northern terminus in Verdemont, heading south through downtown and Hospitality Lane, all the way to Loma Linda. The Marshall Boulevard Station services the neighborhood.

== Education ==
Blair Park is completely located within the San Bernardino City Unified School District, and is located 3 miles (4.8 km) south of top-nationally ranked California State University, San Bernardino. In addition, Blair Park has one elementary school, Marshall Elementary School. No middle schools lie within the neighborhood boundaries but Shandin Hills Middle School and Arrowview Middle Schools are the closest. Furthermore, the neighborhood does not have any high schools but the nearby University District contains Cajon High School.
