= Muscoy, California =

Muscoy
- Census-designated place
- Interactive map of Muscoy
- Location in the United States
- Coordinates: 34°09′15″N 117°20′39″W
- Country: United States
- State: California
- County: San Bernardino

Area
  - Total: 3.041 sq mi (7.876 km^{2})
  - Land: 3.041 sq mi (7.876 km^{2})
  - Water: 0 sq mi (0.000 km^{2}) 0%
- Elevation: 1,388 ft (423 m)

Population (2020)
  - Total: 10,719
  - Density: 3,525/sq mi (1,361/km^{2})
- Time zone: UTC−8 (Pacific)
  - Summer (DST): UTC−7 (PDT)
- ZIP code: 92407
- Area code: 909
- FIPS code: 06-50132
- GNIS feature ID: 1652756

Muscoy is a census-designated place (CDP) in the Inland Empire region of San Bernardino County, California, United States. The population was 10,719 at the 2020 census, up from 10,644 at the 2010 census. Muscoy shares ZIP code 92407 with the communities of Verdemont, Devore Heights, Rosena Ranch and Arrowhead Farms in northwestern San Bernardino. Residents enjoy a semi-rural setting with large lots where they can raise horses and other livestock, nursery plants, and fruit trees. For this reason, much of Muscoy is included in the county Additional Agriculture (AA) overlay, which specifies the types and quantities of animals that may be kept on each parcel. A distinctive feature of Muscoy life today is motor vehicles and equestrians sharing the roadways.

== History ==
Spanish and Mexican land grants made up much of the Inland Empire during the early 1800s. Among these ranchos included Rancho Santa Ana Del Chino, Rancho Cucamonga, Rancho San Bernardino and Rancho Muscupiabe.

Rancho Muscupiabe encompassed what is now Muscoy as well as portions of San Bernardino. The area’s recorded history dates back to 1843 when the land was granted to Michael White. The name Muscoy is believed to be a shortened version of Muscupiabe. In 1891, two local ranchers formed the Muscoy Mutual Water Company, which helped to establish the community’s name and identity.

In 1926, the Muscoy Water Company sold its holdings to C.H. Jonas and J.B. Roof. The new owners created a land company and by the spring of 1927, the company had amassed thousands of acres for development and sale under the name Muscoy Ranch.

Roads and water infrastructure were built to serve one-to-ten-acre parcels. Following World War II, population growth accelerated and the community began transitioning from an agricultural area to a suburban residential area.

As the population grew, Muscoy supported its own newspaper, the Muscoy News. In 1947, community leaders established the Muscoy Chamber of Commerce to address the needs of the community. During the 1950s and 1960s, additional businesses opened to serve travelers and residents, while more families settled permanently in the Muscoy area. The community also had its own Little League program.

Today, Muscoy is home to the Baker Family Learning Center, one of the newest branches of the San Bernardino County Library system. The land for the center was donated by Muscoy native Neal T. Baker, the founder of the Inland Empire fast food chain Baker’s Drive-Thru.

The Baker Family Learning Center features a meeting room, computer lab, library and a preschool. In partnership with the county’s Head Start program, it also offers parent engagement programs. Today, over 12,000 people call Muscoy home. In 1989, a gasoline pipeline explosion caused two deaths.

== Geography ==
Muscoy is located at 34°9′22″N 117°20′48″W (34.156009, -117.346552). Elevation ranges from 1240' in the south to 1600' in the north.

According to the United States Census Bureau, the CDP has a total area of 3.0 square miles (7.8 km^{2}), all land.

Muscoy is bordered on the west by Lytle Creek wash, most of the time a dry river bed, other times the scene of raging flash floods.

== Demographics ==
Historical population
Census	Pop.	Note	%±
1970	7,091		—
1980	6,188		−12.7%
1990	7,541		21.9%
2000	8,919		18.3%
2010	10,644		19.3%
2020	10,719		0.7%
U.S. Decennial Census; 1850–1870 1880-1890; 1900 1910 1920; 1930 1940 1950; 1960 1970 1980; 1990 2000 2010

Muscoy was first listed as an unincorporated place in the 1970 U.S. census; and then as a census designated place in the 1980 U.S. census.

=== 2020 census ===
As of the 2020 census, Muscoy had a population of 10,719 and a population density of 3,524.8 inhabitants per square mile (1,360.9/km^{2}). The median age was 29.7 years. The age distribution was 31.4% under the age of 18, 11.6% aged 18 to 24, 26.8% aged 25 to 44, 21.9% aged 45 to 64, and 8.4% aged 65 or older. For every 100 females, there were 102.6 males, and for every 100 females age 18 and over, there were 101.7 males age 18 and over.

The census reported that 99.4% of the population lived in households, 0.6% lived in non-institutionalized group quarters, and no one was institutionalized. In addition, 99.7% of residents lived in urban areas, while 0.3% lived in rural areas.

There were 2,375 households, out of which 56.8% included children under the age of 18, 51.7% were married-couple households, 8.8% were cohabiting couple households, 21.6% had a female householder with no partner present, and 17.9% had a male householder with no partner present. 7.5% of households were one person, and 2.3% were one person aged 65 or older. The average household size was 4.49. There were 2,090 families (88.0% of all households).

There were 2,448 housing units at an average density of 805.0 units per square mile (310.8 units/km^{2}). Of these, 2,375 (97.0%) were occupied and 73 (3.0%) were vacant. Of occupied units, 52.9% were owner-occupied and 47.1% were occupied by renters. The homeowner vacancy rate was 0.3%, and the rental vacancy rate was 2.5%.

Racial composition as of the 2020 census
Race	Number	Percent
White	1,930	18.0%
Black or African American	308	2.9%
American Indian and Alaska Native	339	3.2%
Asian	76	0.7%
Native Hawaiian and Other Pacific Islander	27	0.3%
Some other race	6,377	59.5%
Two or more races	1,662	15.5%
Hispanic or Latino (of any race)	9,476	88.4%

=== Demographic estimates ===
In 2023, the US Census Bureau estimated that 35.5% of the population were foreign-born. Of all people aged 5 or older, 18.1% spoke only English at home, 79.9% spoke Spanish, 1.3% spoke other Indo-European languages, and 0.8% spoke Asian or Pacific Islander languages. Of those aged 25 or older, 52.4% were high school graduates and 6.1% had a bachelor's degree.

=== Income and poverty ===
The median household income in 2023 was $57,726, and the per capita income was $21,271. About 15.5% of families and 19.1% of the population were below the poverty line.

=== 2010 census ===
At the 2010 census Muscoy had a population of 10,644. The population density was 3,382.4 inhabitants per square mile (1,306.0/km^{2}). The racial makeup of Muscoy was 4,459 (41.9%) White (11.0% Non-Hispanic White), 454 (4.3%) African American, 125 (1.2%) Native American, 101 (0.9%) Asian, 16 (0.2%) Pacific Islander, 4,992 (46.9%) from other races, and 497 (4.7%) from two or more races. Hispanic or Latino of any race were 8,824 persons (82.9%).

The census reported that 10,355 people (97.3% of the population) lived in households, 289 (2.7%) lived in non-institutionalized group quarters, and no one was institutionalized.

There were 2,231 households, 1,445 (64.8%) had children under the age of 18 living in them, 1,231 (55.2%) were opposite-sex married couples living together, 423 (19.0%) had a female householder with no husband present, 279 (12.5%) had a male householder with no wife present. There were 236 (10.6%) unmarried opposite-sex partnerships, and 16 (0.7%) same-sex married couples or partnerships. 197 households (8.8%) were one person and 68 (3.0%) had someone living alone who was 65 or older. The average household size was 4.64. There were 1,933 families (86.6% of households); the average family size was 4.76.

The age distribution was 3,780 people (35.5%) under the age of 18, 1,555 people (14.6%) aged 18 to 24, 2,719 people (25.5%) aged 25 to 44, 1,998 people (18.8%) aged 45 to 64, and 592 people (5.6%) who were 65 or older. The median age was 24.9 years. For every 100 females, there were 102.8 males. For every 100 females age 18 and over, there were 102.2 males.

There were 2,443 housing units at an average density of 776.3 per square mile, of the occupied units 1,268 (56.8%) were owner-occupied and 963 (43.2%) were rented. The homeowner vacancy rate was 3.7%; the rental vacancy rate was 8.2%. 5,914 people (55.6% of the population) lived in owner-occupied housing units and 4,441 people (41.7%) lived in rental housing units.

According to the 2010 United States Census, Muscoy had a median household income of $39,239, with 33.0% of the population living below the federal poverty line.

== Education ==
Muscoy is served by the San Bernardino City Unified School District, through Vermont Elementary and Muscoy Elementary schools, and through the PAL Center, a charter school. The US Department of Labor operates Inland Empire Job Corps Center, where young adults can complete high school and learn a career or trade.

== Politics ==
In the California State Legislature, Muscoy is in the 29th senatorial district, represented by Democrat Eloise Reyes, and in the 45th Assembly district, represented by Democrat James Ramos.

In the United States House of Representatives, Muscoy is in California's 33rd congressional district, represented by Democrat Pete Aguilar.

Muscoy is located within the 5th Supervisorial district of San Bernardino County. A board of local citizens appointed by the Supervisor, and approved by the whole Board of Supervisors, constitutes the Muscoy Municipal Advisory Council (MAC). The Muscoy MAC currently meets on the third Tuesday of even-numbered months at County Fire Station #75, at 7:00pm.

An informal group, Concerned Citizens, meets on the first Friday of each month at Muscoy United Methodist Church to discuss quality-of-life issues for formal presentation for action by the Board of Supervisors.
