= Blair Park =

Blair Park may refer to:

- Blair Park (Piedmont), a small park in the city of Piedmont, California
- Blair Park, San Bernardino, a neighborhood in San Bernardino, California

== See also ==
- Blair Drummond Safari Park
