= The Montclarion =

The Montclarion may refer to:

- the student newspaper of Montclair State University
- a weekly newspaper published in Montclair, Oakland, California by the East Bay Times
