= Hospitality Lane District, San Bernardino =

Coordinates: 34.066°N 117.279°W

- District community
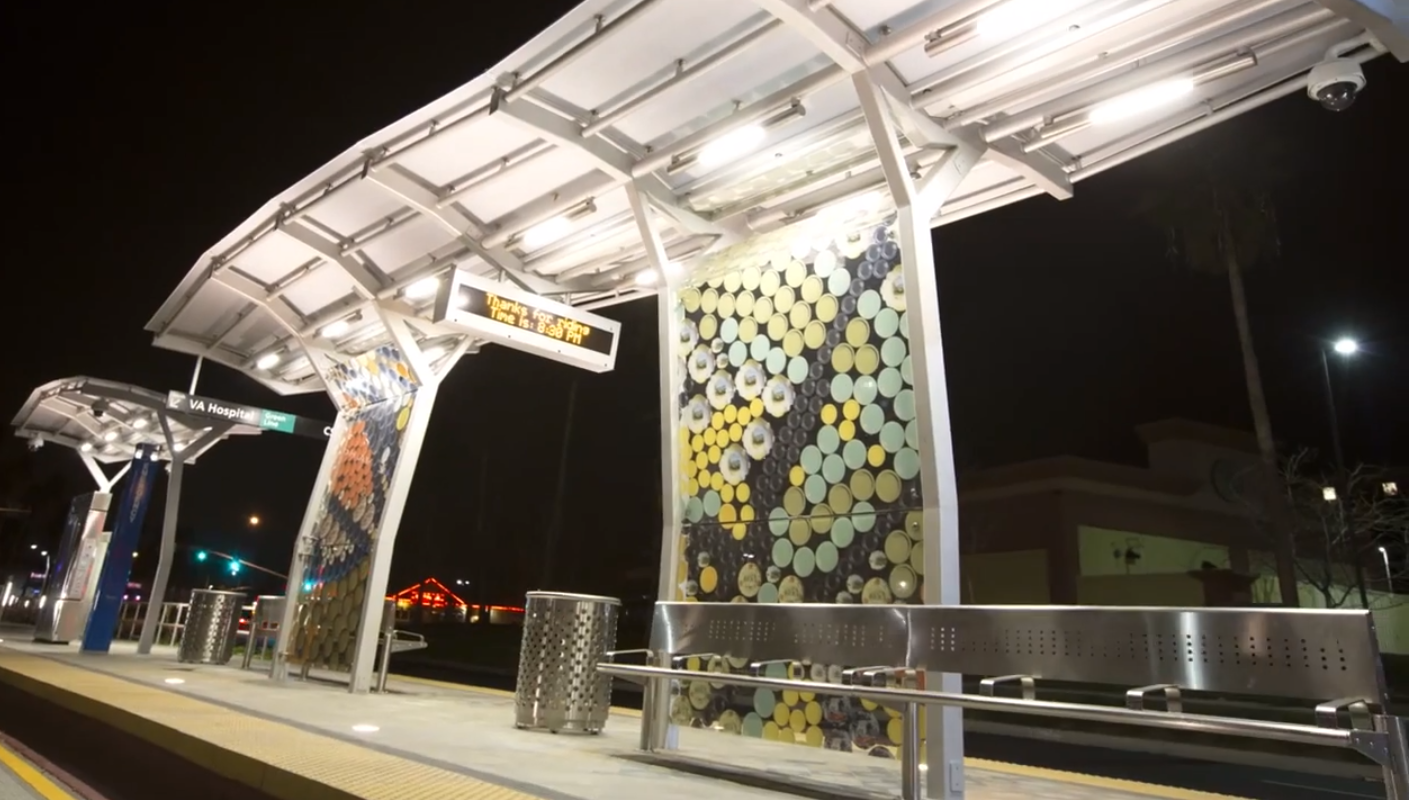
- Hospitality Lane - West sbX Station
- Nicknames: The Lane; Hospitality
- Interactive map of Hospitality Lane District, San Bernardino
- Country: United States
- State: California
- City: San Bernardino
- Elevation: 1,157 ft (353 m)
- Time zone: UTC-8 (PST)
  - Summer (DST): UTC-7 (PDT)

The Hospitality Lane District is a central business district in San Bernardino, California, located 2–3 miles (3–5 km) southeast of the city's downtown area along the street of the same name. It is adjacent to Interstate 10, and is only a few miles away from San Bernardino International Airport. The district is home to the headquarters for the San Bernardino Community College District. The district primarily includes retail establishments, dining, and many of the city's hotels; it has been described as a "center of shopping and restaurant activity" in the San Bernardino Valley with some of the Inland Empire's "finest hotels, restaurants and office buildings". In addition, the area has attracted office development. Hospitality Lane is one of the most prosperous and developed areas in San Bernardino, a city which is otherwise economically troubled. However, the district has experienced increased crime as a result of its development, particularly due to its nightclubs. The district was built in a depressed area of San Bernardino after the city's Redevelopment Agency cleared the land and sold it to developers. In 2006, the last vacant property in Hospitality Lane was sold; at the time, the district had 16 restaurants. In 2011, the city proposed a center-lane exclusive high-speed bus line known as sbX in the Hospitality Lane area and is under construction as of 2013 with an expected launch date of January 2014. In 2008, the district experienced a small downturn as several businesses in the area closed; local economists stated that the downturn may have been caused by the economic recession.
