= Rosa Parks Memorial Building =

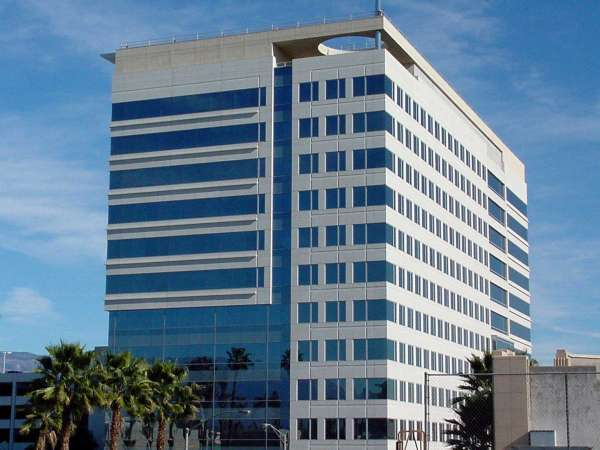

General information
- Location: San Bernardino, California, United States
- Coordinates: 34.1067°N 117.2933°W
- Opened: 1990s

The Rosa Parks Memorial Building is a 13-story high-rise located in downtown San Bernardino, California. It was built in the 1990s and designed by architect Richard Keating. The building serves as government headquarters for San Bernardino County and California's Inland Empire region.

The building is the second tallest in the city of San Bernardino and fourth tallest in the Inland Empire by height since the new San Bernardino Justice Center building, is 200 feet (61 m) but only has 11 floors; that building opened in 2014.
