= Shandin Hills =

Mountain range of the Transverse Ranges in California, United States

- Location within California Location within the United States

Highest point
- Peak: Little Mountain
- Elevation: 1,749 ft (533 m)

Geography
- Country: United States
- State: California
- County: San Bernardino
- City: San Bernardino
- Range coordinates: 34°9′29.035″N 117°18′59.160″W
- Parent range: Transverse Ranges
- Topo map: USGS San Bernardino North

The Shandin Hills are a low mountain range of the Transverse Ranges system of Southern California.

== Geography ==
The hills are located within the City of San Bernardino, in southern San Bernardino County.

The Shandin Hills are separate and south of the San Bernardino Mountains foothills, and not as high in elevation. The dominant mountain of the hills is Little Mountain, at 564 metres (1,850 ft) in elevation.

I-215 passes through the mountain range via the Shandin Pass, connecting not only the University District and Downtown San Bernardino, but also the South and North San Bernardino boroughs.
