= Montclair, Oakland, California =

Montclair
- Neighborhood of Oakland
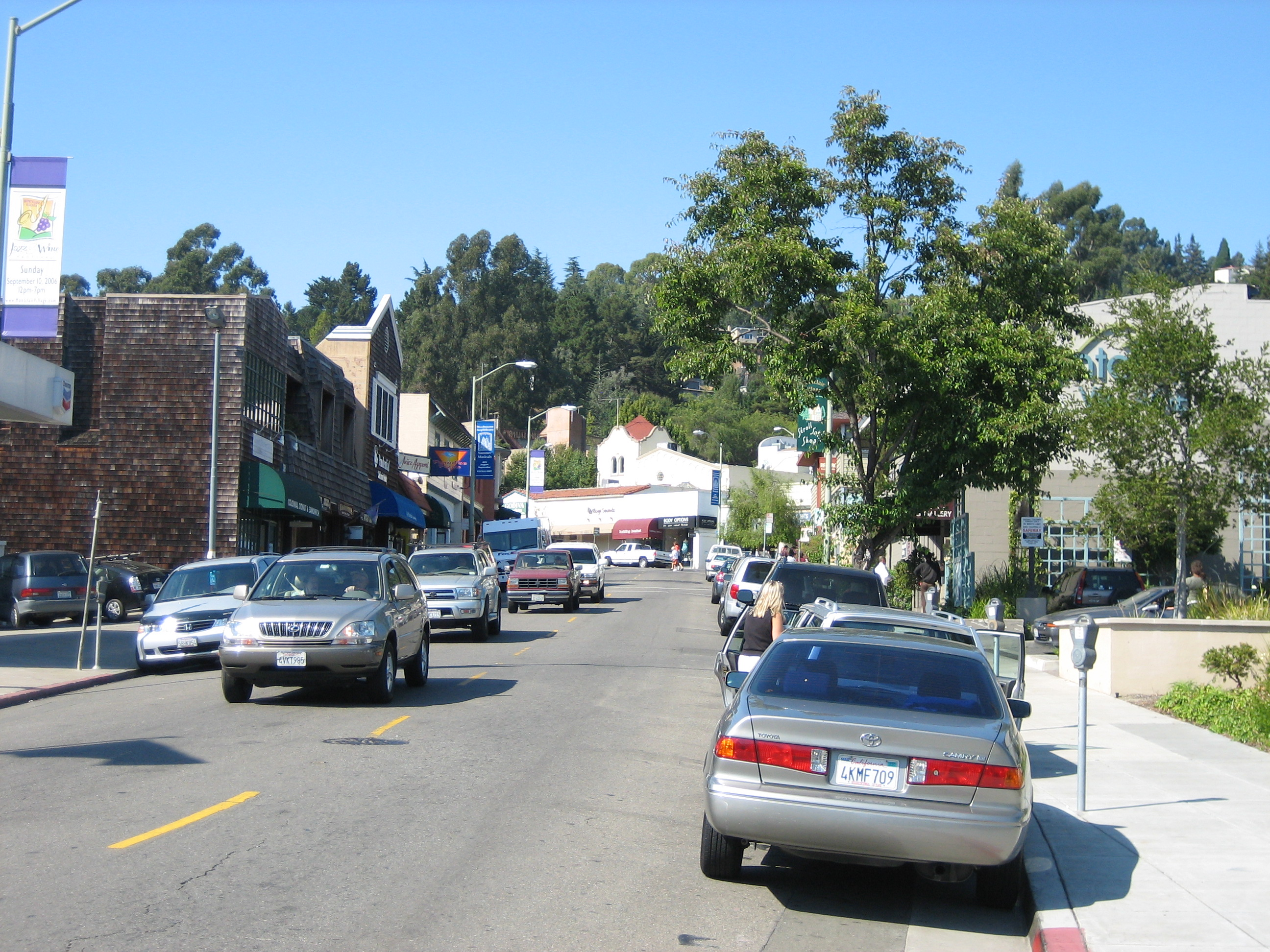
- A street view of Montclair Village

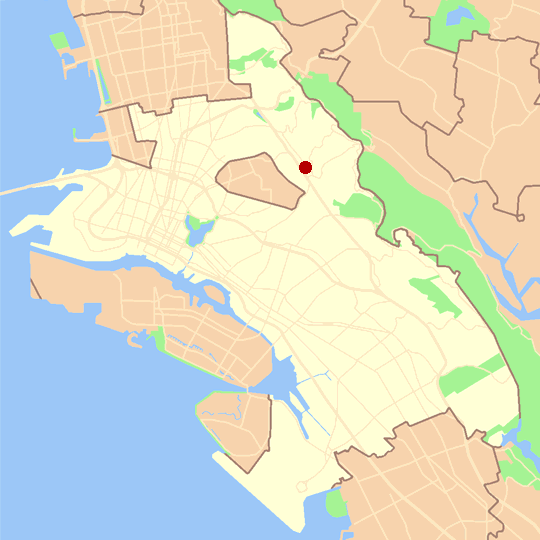
- Location in Oakland
- Coordinates: 37.832222°N 122.209167°W
- Country: United States
- State: California
- County: Alameda
- City: Oakland

Montclair (also known as the Montclair District or Montclair Village) is a hillside neighborhood in Oakland, California, United States. Montclair is located along the western slope of the Oakland Hills from a valley formed by the Hayward Fault to the upper ridge of the hills.

Although there is no formal definition of the neighborhood, the general boundaries are Highway 24 to the north, Joaquin Miller Road to the south, the city of Piedmont to the west and the Contra Costa County border to the east. The center of the neighborhood is a compact shopping district known as Montclair Village, which is located next to Highway 13 in the bottom of the valley. It lies at an elevation of 640 feet (195 m).

== Geography ==
The Montclair district is situated around the Hayward Fault which forms a valley running primarily northwest to southeast. The district rises to the west slightly and to the east to the crest of the Oakland hills.

Prior to modern development Montclair was geographically demarcated by two creek valleys, one on the northeast and one on the southwest, that both run mostly east to west from the Oakland Hills down to the valley formed by the Hayward Fault and beyond.

On the northwest the upper reaches of Temescal Creek run down Thornhill Drive and Pinehaven Road. The creek remains visible above ground in the upper sections along Thornhill and Pinehaven. The creek has two branches that join at the intersection of Thornhill and Pinehaven. From this confluence the creek flows down the south side of Thornhill until Thornhill Elementary School where it then undergrounds and flows down the remainder of Thornhill and then down Mountain Blvd. to Broadway Terrace, before draining into Lake Temescal.

On the southeast end of Montclair, the north fork of Sausal Creek (also called Shephard Creek) runs down Shepherd Canyon. At Highway 13, near the parking lot of the Montclair Golf Course, the north fork of Sausal Creek has its confluence with the south fork (also called Palo Seco Creek) running from the eastern hills (encompassing Joaquin Miller Park). The creek then runs down through Dimond Canyon and across the flatlands (mostly in culverts) to San Francisco Bay.

== History ==
Prior to the Spanish Mission era, native Huchiun and Jalquin tribes of Ohlone Indians populated the general area.

In 1820, Montclair and Dimond Canyon were part of the land from El Cerrito to San Leandro which was granted to Luis Maria Peralta. In 1842, Peralta divided his land among his sons and the San Antonio section, including Montclair and Dimond Canyon, went to his son Antonio Maria Peralta.

In the northern creek valley, Thornhill Road dates back to some of the earliest development of Montclair. This was an old 19th century logging road built by and named after Hiram Thorn. Thorn's road brought redwood logs to Oakland out of the vast forest known as the Moraga Redwoods where he ran a lumber mill at Pinehurst Road near Huckleberry Botanic Regional Preserve west of the community of Canyon. Thornhill later became a toll road to Contra Costa County.

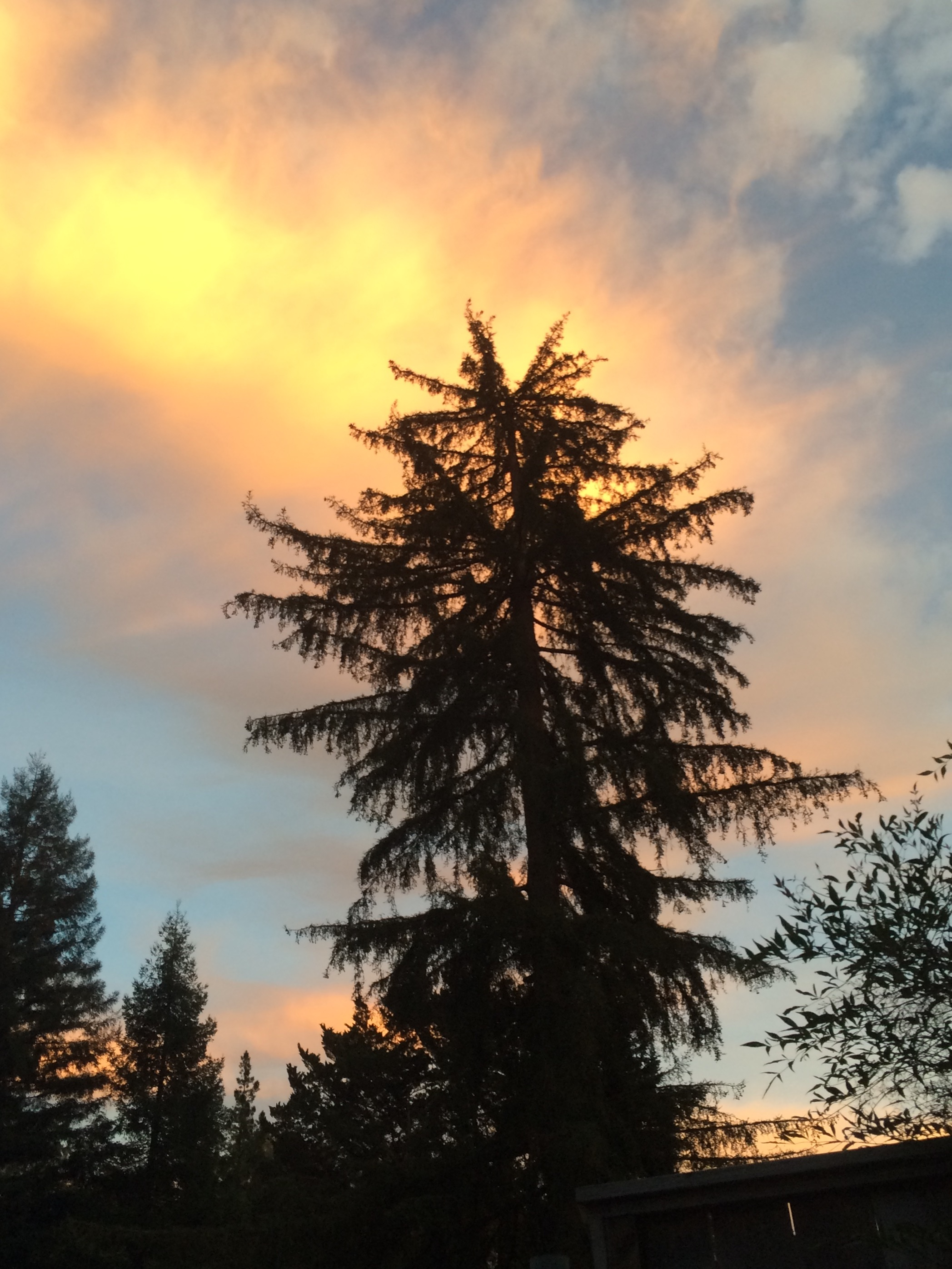
Large redwood tree in Montclair

From Shepherd Canyon extending toward the southeast, the Bayside hills were covered in a vast redwood forest known as the San Antonio Redwoods. Two especially tall trees (the Navigation or Blossom Rock trees) were used by sailors as a navigation aid to avoid Blossom Rock near Yerba Buena Island. Around 1847, settlers started logging the San Antonio redwood forest. In 1850, the area's first steam sawmill was built on the edge of Montclair at Palo Seco Creek in the head of Dimond Canyon. A logging road to the mill was built high along the northern side of Dimond Canyon which later became Park Boulevard. This logging road connected to a wharf at the foot of 13th Avenue and was used to transport the logs down Dimond Canyon to the Bay. By 1860, the San Antonio forest was logged completely. A second logging occurred after the 1906 San Francisco earthquake. In this instance the second growth redwoods (approximately 50 years old) as well as the stumps from the first generation trees were logged. One of the largest redwood stumps ever found (32 feet in diameter) is in the Oakland hills and only a single old growth redwood (the Grandfather) remains. Current third growth redwoods are protected in parks including Reinhardt Redwood Regional Park, Joaquin Miller Park and Roberts Regional Recreation Area and redwoods of various ages are found in many Montclair neighborhoods.

After the first logging period, Caspar Hopkins, an early settler of the Fruitvale District, formed the Sausal Creek Water Company and built a dam and reservoir at the upper end of Dimond Canyon. The reservoir later became part of the East Bay Water Company and remained until the early 1920s. Early maps show a road passing the reservoir along what is now Waterhouse Road and extending up towards the dam along the current Upper Dimond Canyon Trail. In 1867, Hugh Dimond purchased the canyon.

In the first half of the 20th century, the main line of the Sacramento Northern Railroad ran through Montclair. The tracks ran southward from Lake Temescal and crossed into Montclair over a trestle at Moraga Ave. and Thornhill Dr. There is now a pocket park located here in remembrance of this crossing. The route then ran along a high berm between Montclair Recreation Center and Montclair Elementary School before crossing Mountain Blvd. and Snake Road via trestle and then continued up Shepherd Canyon to a tunnel, the west portal of which was located immediately below Saroni Drive. Today, much of the old right-of-way above the village and in Shepherd Canyon is a pedestrian and bicycle path. Although all the old railroad trestles throughout Montclair were removed decades ago, in recent years a pedestrian bridge was built in the same location of one of them, across Snake Road, to connect the two major sections of the pedestrian pathway. The pathway was paved at the same time.

In 1956, the State of California proposed the construction of a freeway through Shepherd Canyon, connecting to a proposed southern crossing of San Francisco Bay and running through a tunnel to Moraga, then northward toward Pleasant Hill. The proposal was dropped by the late 1960s.

One of the first schools located in Montclair was at the current site of the now-closed Moraga Avenue firehouse and was named in honor of John Coffee Hays, one of the founders of the city of Oakland. The Hays school was closed in 1913.

Though sparsely populated since the logging days the major residential subdivision of the village and hills began in the 1920s.

The 1927 Montclair firehouse was designed in the Hansel and Gretel style by Eldred E. Edwards of the Oakland Public Works Department. Following the 1989 Loma Prieta earthquake the Oakland Fire Department built a new station house on Shepherd Canyon Road and, upon completion, vacated the 1927 structure.

In March 1930, the Montclair branch of the Oakland Public Library was opened on Mountain Blvd. near Thornhill Dr. to serve the growing village. The small building was built in a similar architectural style as the firehouse, an English cottage-style, and remains in use today. After 1965, additions were completed for the children's room and patio at the rear of the original building.

Many homes on the north western edge of the Montclair district were burned in the Oakland firestorm of 1991.

== Parks ==
These parks are in or closely border the Montclair district.

- Beaconsfield Canyon
- Blair Park
- Dimond Canyon Park
- Huckleberry Botanic Regional Preserve
- Joaquin Miller Park
- Lake Temescal Regional Recreation Area
- Marjorie Saunders Park
- Montclair Railroad Trail
- Montclair Recreation Center
- North Oakland Regional Sports Center
- Dr. Aurelia Reinhardt Redwood Regional Park
- Robert Sibley Volcanic Regional Preserve
- Roberts Regional Recreation Area
- Shepherd Canyon Park
- Short Line Pocket Park

== Neighborhood and area groups ==
- Montclair Neighborhood Council – a volunteer community group whose purpose is to act as a liaison with community residents, organizations, police officers, and city officials to prevent, identify, and resolve challenges in the community.
- Montclair Tennis Association – a community tennis association with events held at the Montclair and other near-by public tennis courts.
- Montclair Village Association – an Oakland business improvement district comprising more than 200 businesses located in or near Montclair Village.
- Piedmont Pines Neighborhood Association – one of Oakland's oldest homeowner's associations whose vision is to make Piedmont Pines a scenically beautiful, safe and diverse community.

== Notable people ==
- Dave Brubeck, jazz pianist and composer
- Jerry Brown, politician
- Robert Greenberg, composer, pianist, author, and music historian
- Joyce Maynard, author
- Delroy Lindo actor
