= Verdemont, San Bernardino =

- Neighborhood community
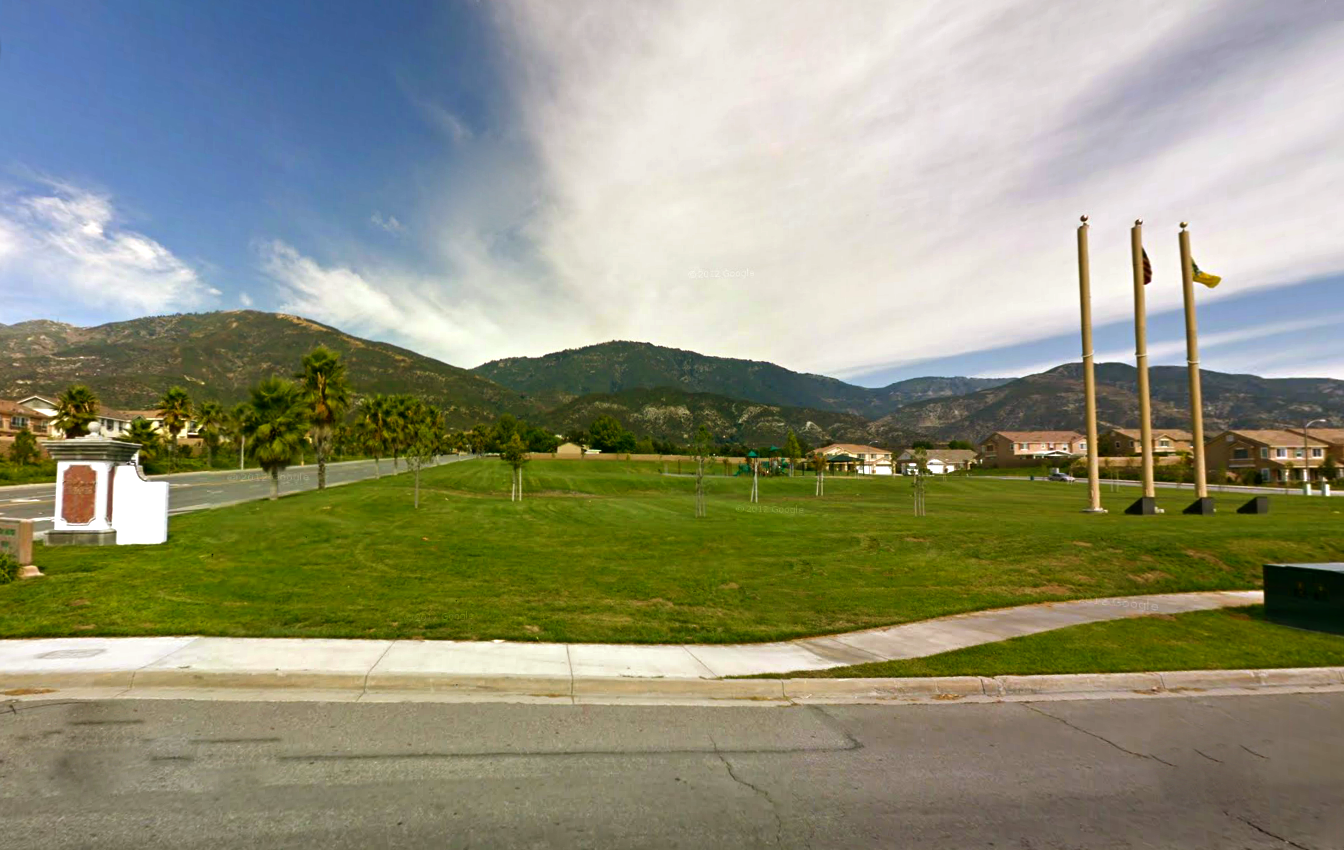
- Tom Minor Park
- Nicknames: V-mont; Northside
- Country: United States
- State: California
- City: San Bernardino
- Elevation: 2,500 ft (760 m)

Population (2006)
  - Total: 22,621
- Time zone: UTC-8 (PST)
  - Summer (DST): UTC-7 (PDT)
- ZIP code: 92407
- Area code: 909

Verdemont, also known as Verdemont Heights, is a foothill and suburban neighborhood located in the northern portion of the city of San Bernardino, California. The neighborhood contains the Western Region Little League headquarters. Verdemont is one of the city's most desirable neighborhoods, holding the city's high income families, along with Arrowhead Springs, and the University District. Verdemont is home to most of the city's million dollar homes.

== Geography ==
Verdemont is located 10 miles (16 km) north of downtown San Bernardino in San Bernardino County, California. The coordinates are latitude 34.193 and longitude -117.368, and the elevation ranges from 1,921 to 2,500 feet, and it is in the Pacific Time Zone (UTC-8, UTC-7 in the summer). Verdemont is part of the Inland Empire Metropolitan Area of California, the 3rd largest in the state, and the 12th largest in the nation. Verdemont is made up of mainly desert shrub. Verdemont consists of many hills and lacks vegetation.

=== Parks ===
Verdemont has five major parks: Verdemont Park and Al Guhin Park, both located on the northern end of the neighborhood, while Littlefield Memorial Park is located on the southern part. Ronald Reagan Park, serves as an educational site, as the park, which honors the 40th President of the United States, is home to a piece of the Berlin Wall. Tom Minor serves as the main park, welcoming people to the neighborhood on the southern region bordering University Town.

== Transportation ==
The City of San Bernardino is a member of the joint-powers authority Omnitrans, including Verdemont. The San Bernardino Express (sbX), a bus rapid transit system, runs from its northern terminus in Verdemont, heading south through downtown and Hospitality Lane, all the way to Loma Linda.

== Education ==
Verdemont is located within the San Bernardino City Unified School District, and is located 2 miles (3.2 km) north-west of top-nationally ranked California State University, San Bernardino. In addition, Verdemont has two elementary (Palm Avenue Elementary, North Verdemont Elementary School), and one middle school (Magnolia Heights Middle School). Although Verdemont does not have any high schools, the nearby University District contains the popular Cajon High School.

== Little League baseball ==
Al Houghton Stadium and the Western Regional Little League headquarters are located on the northern parts of Verdemont. During the first two weeks of August, Verdemont hosts eleven western states in the West and Northwest regional tournaments. During this time, Verdemont gets much media attention.
