= Panorama Fire =

1980 wildfire in Southern California

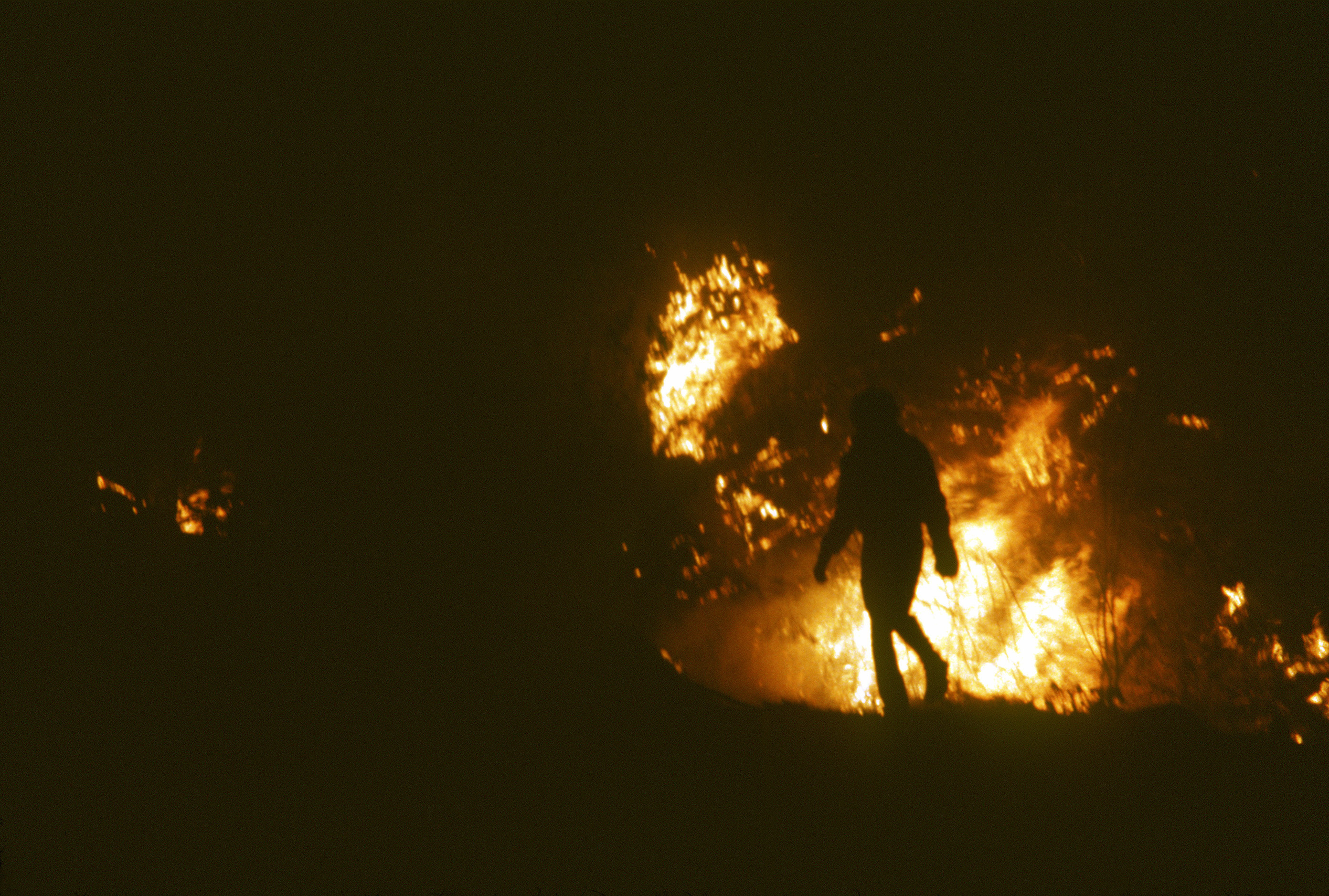
- A nighttime view of a firefighter silhouetted against the flames of the Panorama Fire
- Date: November 24, 1980 –; December 1, 1980; (8 days)
- Location: San Bernardino County, California
- Coordinates: 34.226°N 117.309°W

Statistics
- Burned area: 28,800 acres (11,655 ha; 45 sq mi; 117 km^{2})

Impacts
- Deaths: 4
- Injuries: 77
- Structures destroyed: 325
- Cost: $40 million ($156 million today)

Ignition
- Cause: Arson
- Perpetrator: Unknown
- Motive: Unknown

Map
- Location of the Panorama Fire in Southern California

The Panorama Fire was a destructive and fatal wildfire in the U.S. state of California's San Bernardino County. The fire began on November 24, 1980, and was fully contained on December 1, 1980. The fire was set by an unknown arsonist about 10:50 a.m. near Panorama Point, a county equipment depot along California State Route 18 in the San Bernardino Mountains. The fire's growth was exacerbated by strong Santa Ana winds that reached 90 miles an hour, pushing the flames into populated areas in Waterman Canyon and the city of San Bernardino. 325 structures were destroyed, including 310 homes.

When the fire occurred, it was the fourth most destructive wildfire in recorded California history and the most destructive in the history of San Bernardino County. It has since passed out of the top 20 destructive wildfires statewide, and its structure toll in San Bernardino County was surpassed in 2003 by the Old Fire.

The fire resulted in four fatalities: Earl F. Welty, 83, and his wife, Edith, 82, who were caught in the fire; Joseph Benjamin, 54, who collapsed while watering his roof; and Rosa Myers, 64, who suffered a heart attack while being evacuated.

== Fire progression ==
On November 24, winds were so strong that air tankers were grounded and firefighters reported being pelted by rocks the size of golf balls.

By 1:00 PM on November 25, the fire had burned roughly 10,000 acres and was 10% contained. High winds, of 30 to 40 miles per hour with gusts to 60, continued to ground air tankers.
