= San Bernardino International Airport =

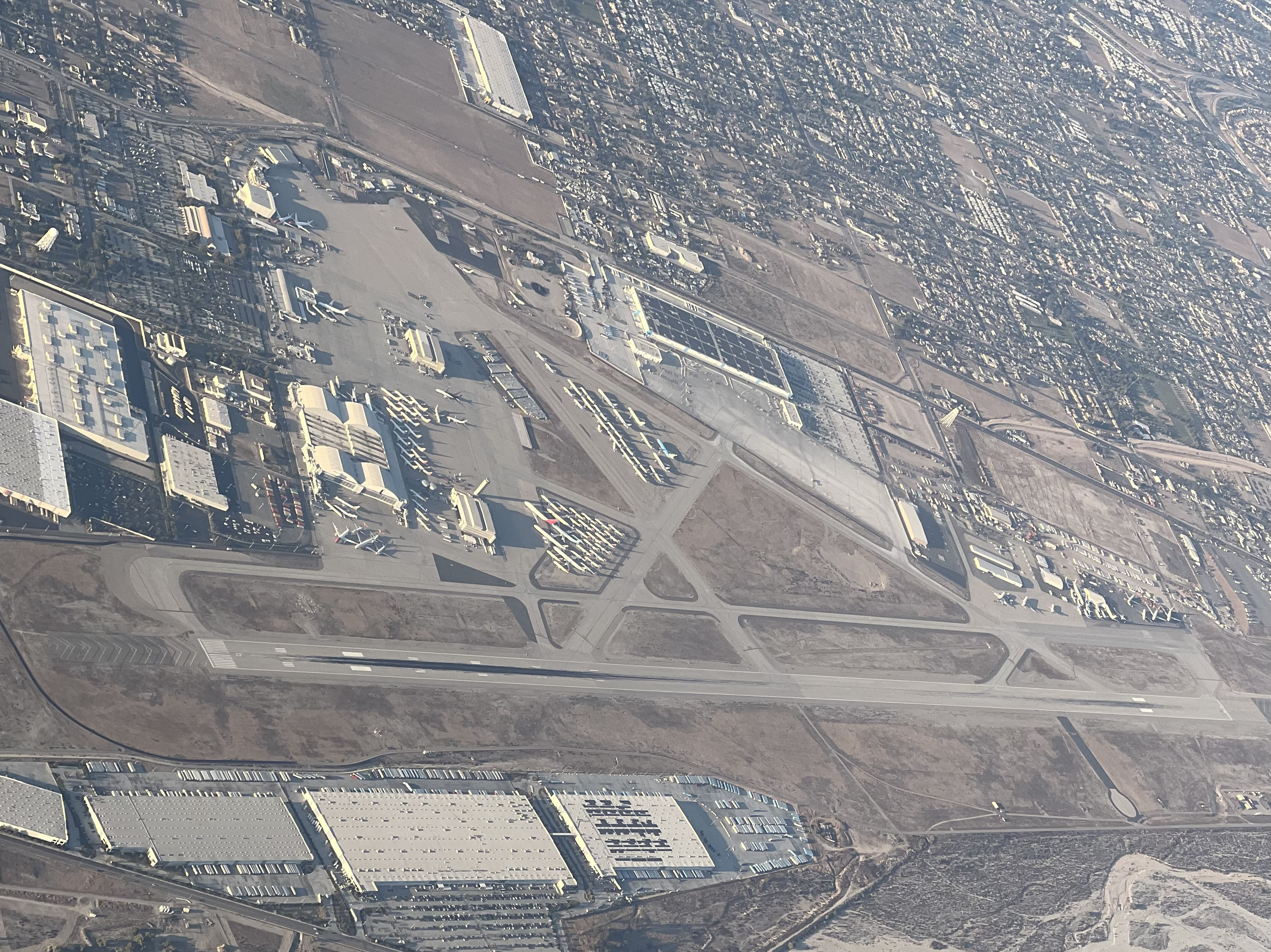
- IATA: SBD; ICAO: KSBD; FAA LID: SBD

Summary
- Airport type: Public
- Owner: San Bernardino International Airport Authority (SBIAA)
- Operator: SBIAA
- Serves: San Bernardino / Inland Empire
- Location: San Bernardino, California, United States
- Hub for: Amazon Air
- Elevation AMSL: 1,159 ft (353 m)
- Coordinates: 34.095°N 117.235°W
- Website: flysbd.com

Maps
- FAA airport diagram
- Interactive map of San Bernardino International Airport

Runways
Direction	Length		Surface
Direction	ft	m	Surface
6/24	10,000	3,048	Concrete

Statistics (2025)
- Aircraft operations: 66,830
- Total passengers: 62,000
- Total cargo (tons): 669,500 US tons
- Source: Federal Aviation Administration

San Bernardino International Airport (IATA: SBD, ICAO: KSBD, FAA LID: SBD) is a public airport two miles (3.2 km) southeast of downtown San Bernardino, California, in San Bernardino County, California, United States. The airport covers 1,329 acres (538 ha) and has one runway that can accommodate the largest existing aircraft, including the Airbus A380 and the Boeing 747.

The facility is a commercial, general aviation, and cargo airport on the site of the former San Bernardino Municipal Airport, which was converted during World War II into the San Bernardino Air Depot in 1942 and which was subsequently renamed "Norton Air Force Base", before being decommissioned with the fall of the Soviet Union.

San Bernardino International Airport encompasses three passenger terminals: a domestic terminal served by Breeze Airways, an international terminal with U.S. Customs and Border Protection processing facility, and the Luxivair SBD executive terminal, an airport-owned fixed-base operator.

== History ==
Norton Air Force Base opened shortly after the attacks on Pearl Harbor. Norton was placed on the Department of Defense's base closure list in 1989.

Most parts of San Bernardino International Airport were completed in 2011, though a customs facility was still under construction. San Bernardino International Airport was built to conform to aviation-demand modeling and allocations performed as part of the 2008 Regional Transportation Plan (RTP) of the Southern California Association of Governments (SCAG), the Metropolitan Planning Organization for San Bernardino, Los Angeles, Riverside, Ventura, Imperial, and Orange counties.

The RTP projected 9.4 million passengers and 1.29 million tons of air cargo at San Bernardino International Airport in 2035 with improved ground access provided, in part, by high-speed rail. The California High-Speed Rail Authority is currently performing alternatives analysis regarding the Los Angeles-to-San Diego segment, which includes, along the I-215 alignment, an optional station location at Rialto Avenue and E Street in the city of San Bernardino.

U.S. Customs and Border Protection agents are available on call to clear imported goods. The airport is used as a base for United States Forest Service planes fighting forest fires. The runway is 10,000 feet (3,000 m) long, easily accommodating all commercial aircraft.

=== San Bernardino County grand jury and FBI investigations ===
An audit completed June 2011 at the request of a grand jury investigation found examples of potential mismanagement and financial irregularities. In September 2011, as part of a special joint corruption task force, the FBI raided the offices of the airport and the home of airport developer Scot Spencer to secure internal documents. In late September 2011, Don Rogers, the Director of the SBIA Authority (SBIAA) resigned.

=== Launch of commercial passenger service ===
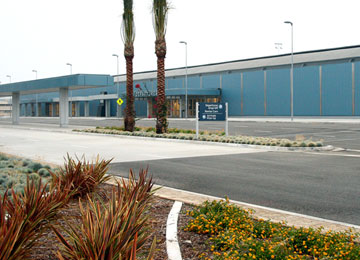
San Bernardino International Airport domestic terminal.

San Bernardino International Airport encompasses three passenger terminals: a domestic terminal served by Breeze Airways, an international terminal with a U.S. Customs and Border Protection processing facility, and the Luxivair SBD executive terminal, an airport-owned fixed-base operator.

In April 2017, Volaris, a Mexican low-cost airline, announced the beginning of flights to Guadalajara, Mexico, for launch on June 29, 2017. However, these plans were later postponed to November 2017, before being cancelled altogether. In March 2022, Breeze Airways first announced plans to operate passenger service at the airport with flights to San Francisco. Scheduled passenger service finally began on August 4, 2022, when Breeze became the first commercial airline to operate passenger flights in and out of SBD's never-used domestic air terminal.

== Airlines and destinations ==
=== Passenger ===
Airlines	Destinations	Refs.
Breeze Airways	Provo, San Francisco	

== Statistics ==
Busiest routes from SBD (August 2025 – July 2026)
Rank	City	Passengers	Carrier(s)
1	San Francisco, California	19,790	Breeze
2	Provo, Utah	6,450	Breeze

== Location ==
The airport and some of the surrounding area is within the city of San Bernardino and the Inland Valley Development Agency. The surrounding areas are being redeveloped by Hillwood. The airport is about two miles east of downtown San Bernardino and 14 miles northeast of Riverside. It is six miles northwest of Redlands, on the outskirts of Highland. Motorists can use the San Bernardino Freeway (Interstate 10), Barstow Freeway (Interstate 215), or the Foothill Freeway (SR 210).

== Ground transportation ==
The Omnitrans route 15 bus connects from North Del Rosa Drive and East Rialto Street to the San Bernardino Transit Center, where Metrolink connections are available to several locations including Los Angeles Union Station.

== In popular culture ==
The airport was the filming location for the 1996 movie Executive Decision, the 2001 movie The Fast and the Furious and the 2004 Martin Scorsese film The Aviator using a Lockheed Constellation preserved by the National Airline History Museum, and flown in for the shoot, with one hangar "dressed" as a Trans World Airlines facility.
