= University District, San Bernardino =

- Neighborhood community
- Nicknames: The UD, University
- Location of the University District, San Bernardino in California
- Coordinates: 34°10′44″N 117°19′37″W
- Country: United States
- State: California
- County: San Bernardino
- City: San Bernardino
- Elevation: 1,486 ft (453 m)
- Time zone: UTC-8 (PST)
  - Summer (DST): UTC-7 (PDT)

The University District, often referred to as University or University Hills, is a foothill community and college town located approximately 5–8 miles north of downtown San Bernardino, California. The District is named after the California State University, San Bernardino. It is one of the most desirable neighborhoods in San Bernardino along with the Hospitality Lane District. As California State University, San Bernardino grew so did the region around it; it used to be nothing but mid-desert farmland, but has been developing quickly to become a neighborhood important to not only San Bernardino but also the entire region.

== Location ==
Like all San Bernardino neighborhoods, the boundaries of the University District are informal; by common usage, the University District is bounded on the west by Cajon Blvd.; on the east by the San Bernardino Mountains (Electric Avenue); on the south by the Shandin Hills; and on the north by the San Bernardino Mountains. Its main commercial streets, University Parkway and Kendall Drive, are known throughout the city as student nightlife hotspots.

Some parts of the University District have had names of their own. For example, on the districts southside some locals refer to it as Shandin Hills because of the local hills, which go by that name.

== Education ==
In addition to California State University, the San Bernardino City Unified School District serves the University District. The Following schools lie within the UD:

High Schools:

- Cajon High School

Middle Schools:

- Shandin Hills Middle School

Elementary Schools:

- Arrowhead Elementary School
- Hillside Elementary School
- Kendall Elementary School
- Newmark Elementary School
- North Park Elementary School
- Little Mountain Elementary School

== University Hills ==
University Hills is a current project planned for the district.
