= SbX =

Bus rapid transit service in San Bernardino County, California

sbX

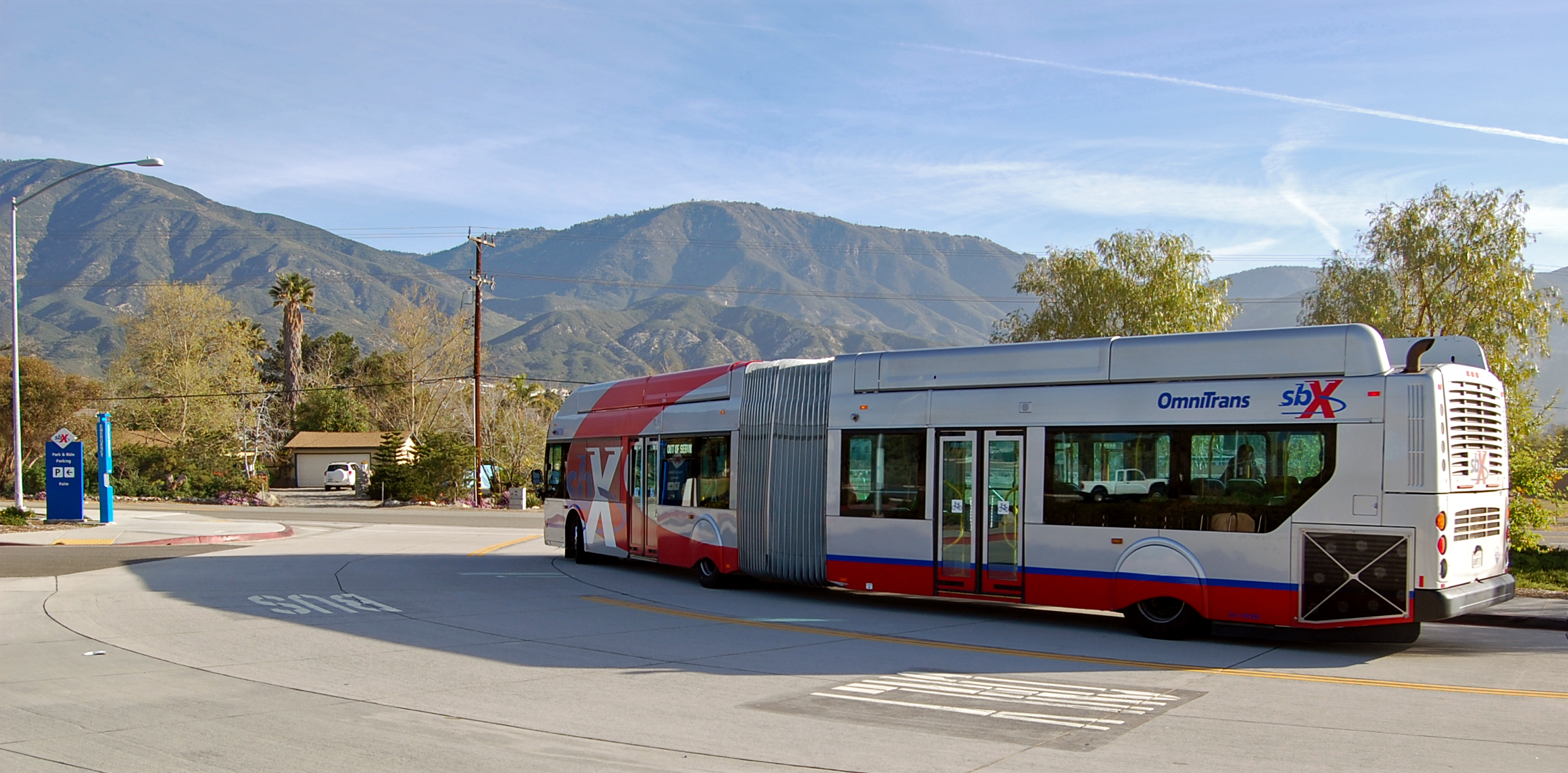
- sbX bus at Palm station

Overview
- Operator: Omnitrans
- Garage: San Bernardino/East Valley
- Began service: April 28, 2014
- Predecessors: Route 2 (still in operation)

Route
- Communities served: San Bernardino, California; Loma Linda, California
- Landmarks served: California State University, San Bernardino; National Orange Show Events Center; Inland Center; Loma Linda University
- Length: 15.7 mi (25 km)

Service
- Frequency: 10–15 minutes (weekdays); 20 minutes (Saturday)
- Operates: 5 am–10 pm (weekdays); 6 am–9 pm (Saturday)
Route map
Green Line highlighted in green

sbX is a bus rapid transit (BRT) service in San Bernardino and Loma Linda, California, United States. It is operated by Omnitrans, a public transportation agency in southwestern San Bernardino County. It intended to be a brand of BRT service that will eventually traverse major surface streets throughout Omnitrans' service area.

The Institute for Transportation and Development Policy (ITDP), under its BRT Standard, has given the initial sbX corridor (the Green Line) corridor a Bronze ranking.

== History ==
=== Initial Development ===
Planning for the sbX BRT system started in 2004, when Omnitrans released its 2004 System-Wide Transit Corridor Plan for the San Bernardino Valley. Among the 10 preliminary corridors identified for potential BRT service, the E Street Corridor (later known as the sbX Green Line) between California State University, San Bernardino (CSUSB) and Loma Linda VA Hospital was identified as the highest priority corridor. Further planning of this route led to a one-stop extension northwest to a park-and-ride at Kendall Drive & Palm Avenue. The OmniTrans Board approved this preferred path in 2008.

=== Construction ===
Construction for the Green Line began in February 2012. It was set to finish in late 2013, but was pushed back due to ongoing construction at San Bernardino's downtown transit center. Service began in April 2014.

Omnitrans upgraded its East Valley vehicle maintenance facility in San Bernardino, including modifications to its parking lot, service bays, bus wash, and fueling facility, to accommodate the 60-foot buses, all of which have been purchased and acquired, to run on the sbX Green Line corridor.

=== Network expansion ===
The San Bernardino County Transportation Authority (SBCTA) is currently planning to grow the system to 10 BRT lines in the San Bernardino Valley.

Omnitrans has received a grant from the Federal Transit Administration to conduct an alternatives analysis for the Holt Boulevard/4th Street Corridor and the cities of Ontario and Fontana are both conducting studies on the feasibility of bus rapid transit along the corridor in their cities. Additionally, planners in Rancho Cucamonga are exploring recommendations on how to support high-density, transit-oriented development along the Foothill Boulevard corridor (Historic Route 66).

==== Purple Line ====
The Purple Line, also known as the West Valley Connector, is an under construction sbX route connecting Pomona–Downtown station to Ontario International Airport. It was expected to open in fall 2026, but has since been delayed to spring 2027, with 21 stations at launch primarily along Holt Boulevard.

The Purple Line is slated to replace Omnitrans Route 82 west of the Ontario Mills mall with 15 minute frequencies.

==== Mid Valley Connector ====
The Mid Valley Connector is a planned bus rapid transit route that will connect the Purple Line with the Green Line.

== Operations ==
=== Green Line ===
On weekdays, buses come every 10 minutes during peak hours and every 15 minutes outside of that. Saturdays have 20-minute frequencies. No service on Sundays.

Station	Type	Location	Notes and Connections	Photo
Palm	C PR	Kendall Dr & Palm Av	Omnitrans: 2	
CSUSB	M	5500 University Pkwy	Located on the campus of California State University San Bernardino; Omnitrans: 2, 6, 312; SunLine Transit Agency: 10 Commuter Link; Victor Valley Transit Authority: 15	
Little Mountain	C	Kendall Dr & Little Mountain Dr	Closest station to Cajon High School (walking distance); Omnitrans: 2	
Shandin Hills	C	Kendall Dr & Shandin Hills Dr/40th St	Omnitrans: 2	
Marshall	C PR	E St & Marshall Bl	Station serves the Blair Park neighborhood. Omnitrans: 2	
Highland	C	E St & Highland Av	Serves San Bernardino High School and San Bernardino Adult School; Omnitrans: 2, 3/4	
Baseline	C	E St & Baseline St	Exclusive sbX bus lanes begin two blocks south near 10th Street; Omnitrans: 2	
Civic Center	M PR	E St & Court St	Serves Downtown, City Hall, and San Bernardino County Court House; Omnitrans: 2	
San Bernardino Transit Center	M PR	E St & Rialto Av	Serves San Bernardino Transit Center, San Manuel Stadium and Loma Linda University Health Care Center; Metrolink: Arrow Inland Empire–Orange County San Bernardino; Omnitrans: 1, 2, 3, 4, 6, 8, 10, 14, 15, 215, 290, 305, OmniAccess; Beaumont Transit: Commuter Link 120; Mountain Transit: Big Bear OTM (5), Crestline OTM (6); Riverside Transit Agency: Commuter Link 200; SunLine Transit Agency: 10 Commuter Link; Victor Valley Transit Authority: 15	
Inland Center Mall	M	E St & N Mall Wy	Serves National Orange Show Events Center and Inland Center; Omnitrans: 2	
Hunts Lane	M	Hospitality Lane at Hunts Lane	Serves County Hall of Records; Omnitrans: 2	
Carnegie	M	Hospitality Ln & Carnegie Dr	Omnitrans: 2	
Tippecanoe	M	Hospitality Ln & Tippecanoe Av	Southernmost sbX station in San Bernardino city limits Exclusive bus lanes end here Omnitrans: 2, 8	
Redlands Blvd.	C PR	Anderson St & Court St	Northernmost station in Loma Linda; Omnitrans: 2, 8	
Loma Linda University	C	Anderson St & Prospect St	Serves Loma Linda University and Loma Linda University Medical Center; Omnitrans: 2	
VA Hospital	C	Benton St & Barton Rd	Omnitrans: 2, 19; Beaumont Transit: Commuter Link 125; Riverside Transit Agency: 14	
Type Code: C = Curbside station or M = Median station | PR = Station has park and ride

=== Purple Line ===
Station	Type	Location	Notes and Connections
Pomona Transit Center	PR	Pomona	Amtrak: Sunset Limited, Texas Eagle; Metrolink: Riverside; Foothill Transit: Silver Streak, 195, 197, 286, 291, 292, 480, 482, 486; Omnitrans: 61
Holt Av/Garey Av	C	Pomona	Foothill Transit: 195, 197, 291, 292, 482, 486
Holt Av/Towne Av	C	Pomona	Foothill Transit: 195, 292
Holt Av/Clark Av	C	Pomona	
Holt Av/Indian Hill Bl	C	Pomona	Serves Indian Hill Village; Foothill Transit: 480
Holt Bl/Ramona Av	C	Montclair	Omnitrans: 88
Holt Bl/Central Av	M	Montclair	Omnitrans: 85
Holt Bl/Mountain Av	M	Ontario	Omnitrans: 84
Holt Bl/San Antonio	M	Ontario	
Holt Bl/Euclid Av	M	Ontario	Amtrak: Sunset Limited, Texas Eagle (at Ontario station); Amtrak Thruway: 19; Omnitrans: 83, 87
Holt Bl/Campus Av	M	Ontario	Omnitrans: 87
Holt Bl/Grove Av	M	Ontario	
Holt Bl/Vineyard Av	C	Ontario	
Ontario International Airport	C PR	Ontario	Serves Ontario International Airport
Inland Empire Bl/Archibald Way	C	Ontario	Serves Ontario Convention Center
Inland Empire Bl/Porsche Way	C	Ontario	
Ontario Mills	C PR	Ontario	Riverside Transit Agency: 204
Rancho Cucamonga station	C PR	Rancho Cucamonga	Metrolink: San Bernardino; Omnitrans: 82
Foothill Bl/Milliken Way	C	Rancho Cucamonga	
Foothill Bl/Rochester Av	C	Rancho Cucamonga	
Victoria Gardens btwn N/S Main St	C PR	Rancho Cucamonga	
Type Code: C = Curbside station or M = Median station | PR = Station has park and ride
