= Rancho Muscupiabe =

Mexican land grant in California

Coordinates: 34.170°N 117.350°W

Rancho Muscupiabe was a 30,145-acre (121.99 km^{2}) Mexican land grant in present day San Bernardino County, California given to Michael C. White on April 29, 1843, by Governor Manuel Micheltorena. The name comes from the Serrano word muscupiabit, meaning "place of little pines." The rancho was adjacent to Cajon Pass.

A separate grant for Cajon de Muscupiabe was given to Juan Bandini by Governor Alvarado in 1839 for the exclusive right to cut timber for 30 years in an area described by meets and bounds, about 1 league.

== History ==
In 1843, Michael White, also known as Miguel Blanco, was granted rights to Rancho Muscupiabe. The land was home to a village of Serrano Indians. White was married to the daughter of Eulalia Perez, the housekeeper of the San Gabriel Mission (located about 45 miles west), and was persuaded to set up a rancho on the path used by raiding bands of nomadic indigenous people. He built a fortified home that overlooked the pass and the Mojave Trail. White left after nine months of having his cattle stolen.

With the cession of California to the United States following the Mexican-American War, the 1848 Treaty of Guadalupe Hidalgo provided that the land grants would be honored. As required by the Land Act of 1851, a claim for Rancho Muscupiabe was filed with the Public Land Commission in 1853, and the grant was patented to Michael White on June 22, 1872 for 30,144.88 acres.

A separate claim for Cajon de Muscupiabe was filed by Juan Bandini in 1852, but was rejected by the Board Jan. 8, 1856, because it was a timber cutting grant only.
