= Blair Park (Piedmont) =

Park in Piedmont, California, United States

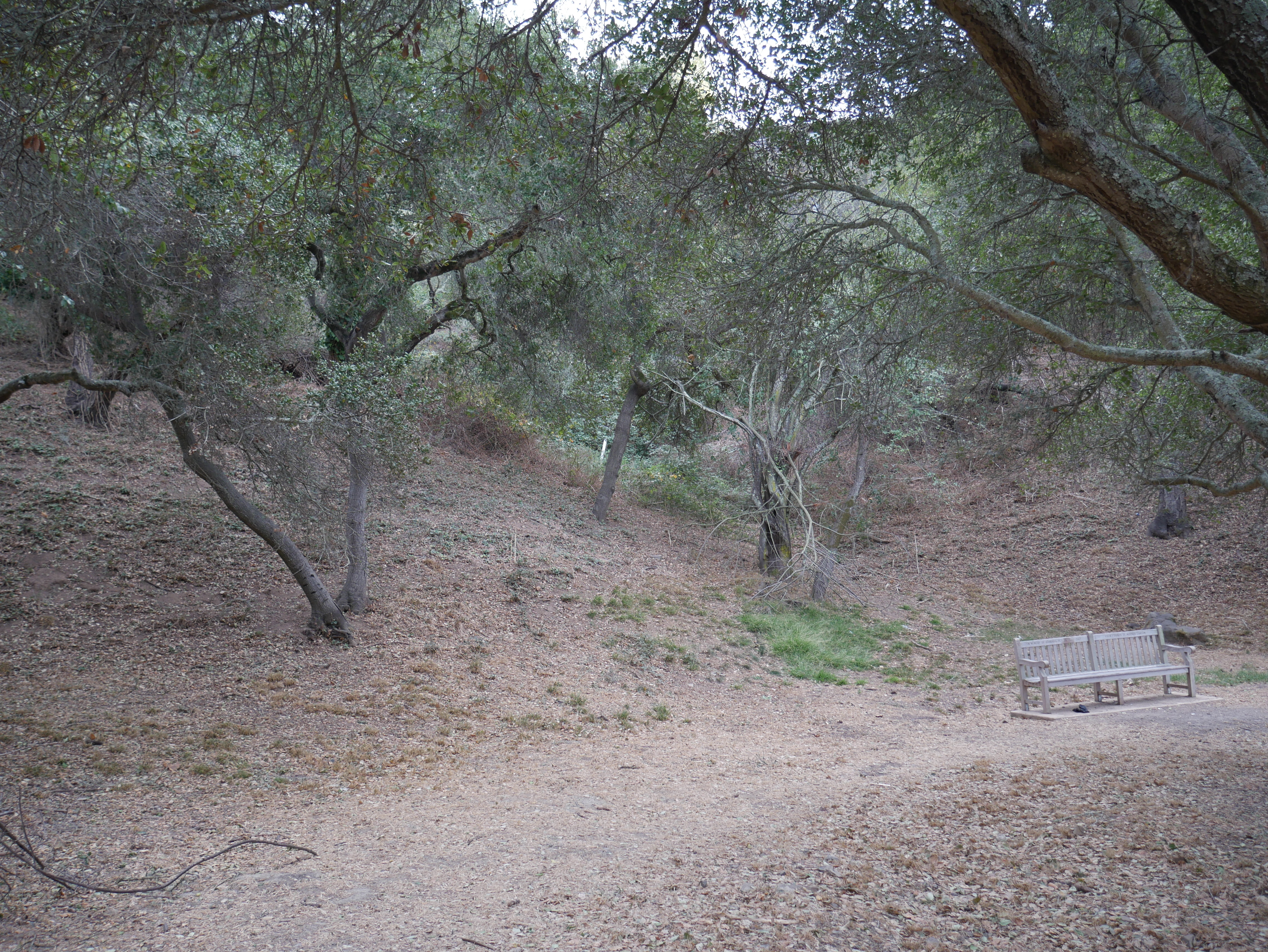
- Interactive map of Blair Park
- Type: Open space reserve
- Location: Piedmont, California
- Coordinates: 37°49′47″N 122°13′41″W
- Area: 5.5 acres (2.2 ha)

Blair Park is a small park in the city of Piedmont, California located in the Oakland Hills near the head of Moraga Canyon.

Originally developed as a 75-acre (30 ha) amusement park, it was much larger than the 5.5 acres (2.2 ha) it currently occupies. Blair Park is the only natural open space left in the city of Piedmont.

== Geography ==
Blair Park is situated near the head of Moraga Canyon which runs east to west starting at Highway 13 and ending at Pleasant Valley Avenue in Oakland, California.

The northern boundary of the current Blair park is Moraga Avenue which is a main thoroughfare running low along the south edge of the canyon. The southern boundary is the top of the steep canyon wall that rises from a level narrow strip up to a residential areas along Scenic Avenue and Alto Avenue in Piedmont.

The level area between Moraga Avenue and the southern canyon wall is landfill and covers what is commonly referred to as Cemetery Creek which is a headwater to Glen Echo Creek.

The eastern and western boundaries are not well defined by any specific geological features.

== History ==
Blair Park was originally a 75-acre amusement park named Blair's Park. Construction started in 1884. In 1888 it was renamed Oakland Park but was still commonly referred to as Blair Park. The amusement park featured waterfalls and lakes on Cemetery Creek. Horse-drawn (and later cable-drawn) streetcars took people up to the park where they would walk, picnic, sail boats, ride horses, attend concerts and watch acrobats and aeronauts perform from balloons.

Beginning in 2009 the park was the center of a significant controversy to convert it to a large sports complex that would cover most of the existing natural open space. Eventually this project was rejected by the Piedmont City Council and a plan to enhance the park to an even more natural state with improved drainage and removal of invasive non-native flora began.
