= Downtown San Bernardino =

- Neighborhood
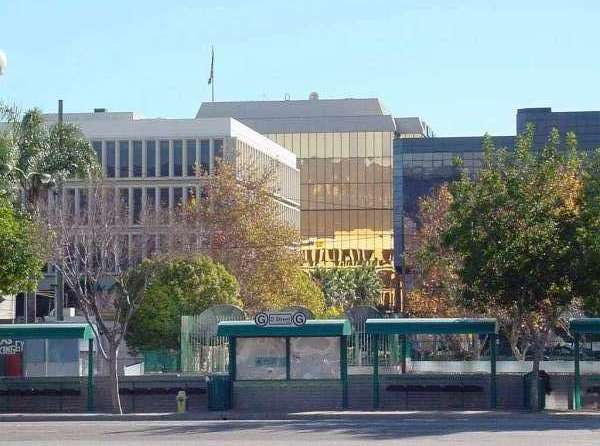
- Downtown San Bernardino
- Nickname(s): DTSB, Central City
- Interactive map of Downtown San Bernardino
- Coordinates: 34°7′46″N 117°17′35″W
- Country: United States
- State: California
- City: San Bernardino
- Elevation: 1,059–1,500 ft (323–457 m)
- Time zone: UTC-8 (PST)
  - Summer (DST): UTC-7 (PDT)
- Website: Official website

Downtown San Bernardino or DTSB is a neighborhood in the city of San Bernardino, California, in San Bernardino County, United States. It is home to city and county government buildings, and to the city's central business district. The downtown area of San Bernardino is home to multiple (and the only) diplomatic missions for the Inland Empire, being one of only four California cities with multiple consulates (the other cities being Los Angeles, San Diego, and San Francisco). The governments of Guatemala (opened July 2014) and Mexico have established their consulates in the civic center. Downtown San Bernardino is bounded by I-215 to the west, Waterman Avenue to the east, Baseline Street to the north, and Mill Street to the south.

The San Bernardino City Council has initiated several redevelopment efforts. The city's Economic Development Agency presented the council with a draft of the Downtown Core Vision / Action Plan in 2009, created in partnership with the urban planning firm EDAW, as a guide for revitalizing downtown San Bernardino over the next 10 years. The city has also discussed the construction of a new government center/civic plaza that will contain an iconic 24-story tower. On May 11, 2014 the county of San Bernardino opened a 12-story, 200-foot-tall courthouse known as the San Bernardino Justice Center. The county is consolidating many county-wide court functions into the new structure, which is the tallest building in San Bernardino.

== Parks ==
=== Seccombe Lake ===
Seccombe Lake Park includes a lake named after a former Mayor of San Bernardino. It is located at the corner of 5th Street and Sierra Way. On December 10, 2015, federal authorities searched the lake after receiving a tip that the shooters in the San Bernardino terrorist attack visited on the day of the attack. A dive team searched for evidence, but nothing relevant was found.

== Entertainment district ==
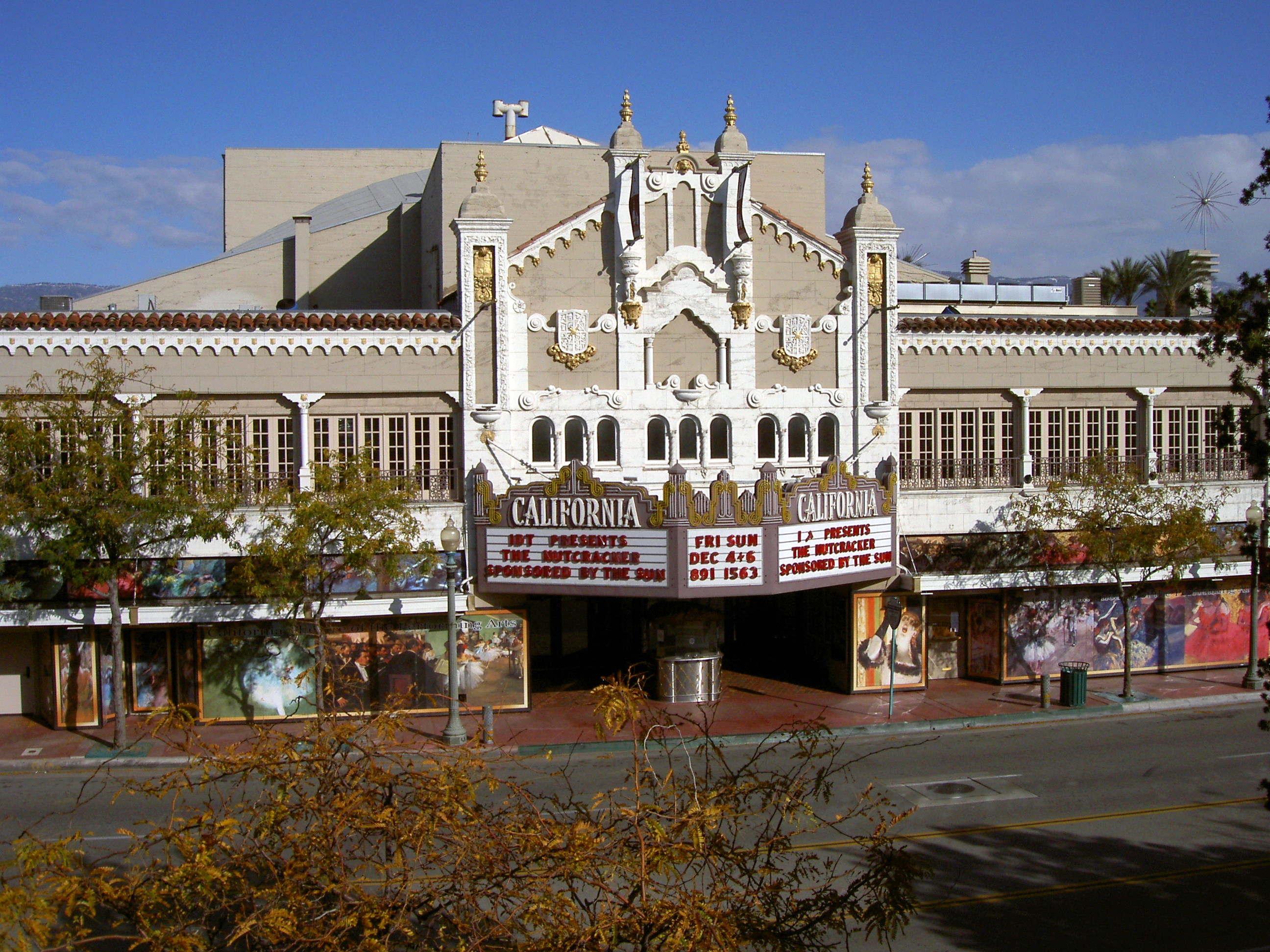
The historic California Theater.

Downtown is home to three performing arts venues and a movie theater, the most for any central business district in the Inland Empire. The city is planning a new district along Fourth Street. The key aspect of the plan is to make the area around the California Theater and future Regal San Bernardino Theater Square Stadium 14 site on Fourth Street as an area for entertainment and dining. The Regal Stadium 14 opened in the spring of 2012, but the need for new dining opportunities remains.

=== Opening of Regal Entertainment Group ===
Downtown San Bernardino had a large, luxurious, two-story theater until it closed in September 2008. Maya Cinemas was expected to open at the old site of the CinemaStar on February 27, 2009, however it failed to do so, and plans for a downtown San Bernardino theater were scratched. As of January 2011, Regal Entertainment Group was in negotiations with the city of San Bernardino to open a theater in the former Cinema Star site. In November 2011, the city of San Bernardino approved a negotiation with Regal has now taken over/rehabilitated the theater, which opened on June 29, 2012 with RPX under the name of Regal San Bernardino Theater Square Stadium 14 & RPX.

== Norman F. Feldheym Central Library ==
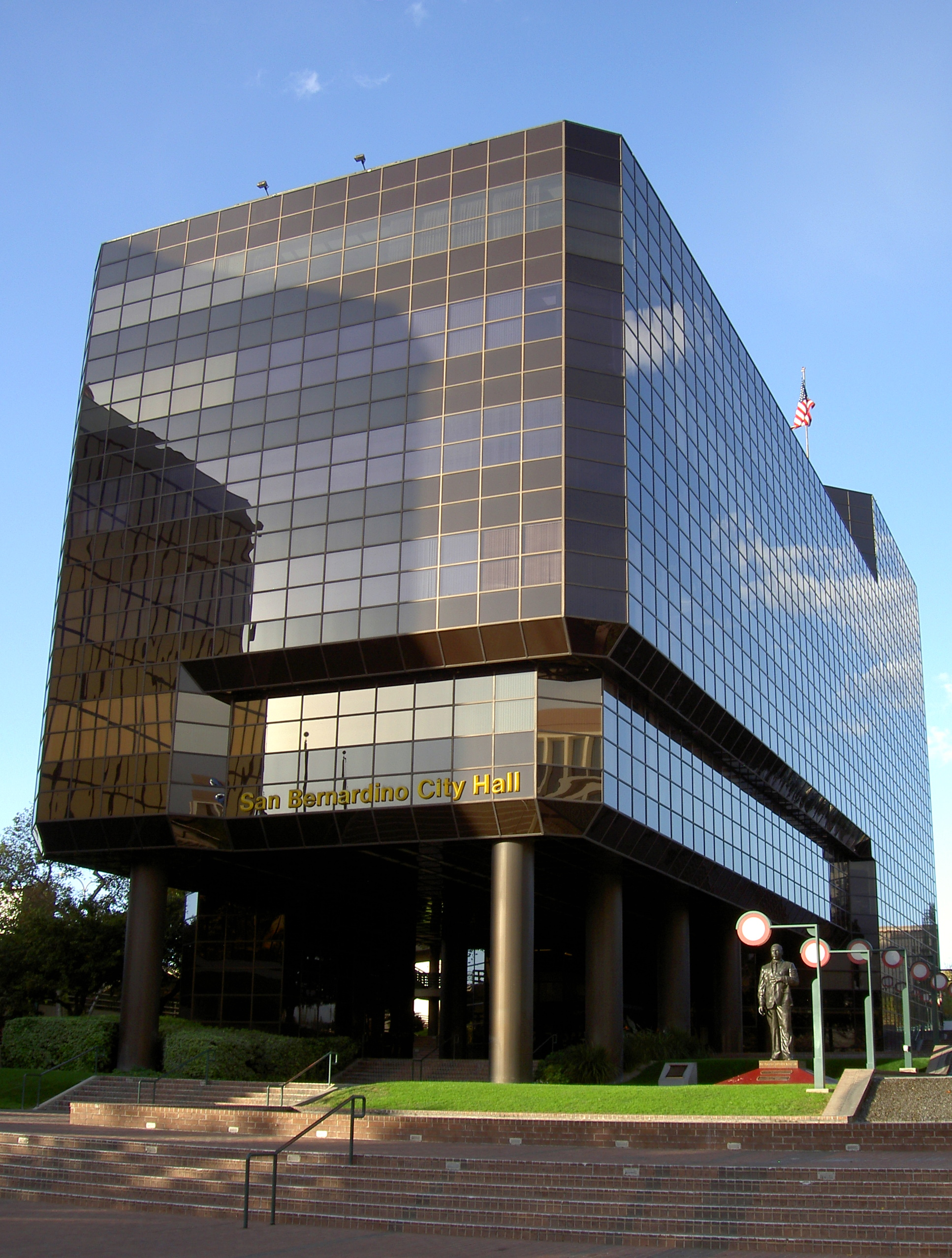
San Bernardino City Hall

The Norman F. Feldheym Central Library is the flagship of the San Bernardino Public Library system. It opened on September 30, 1985, and is the city's fifth central library building since the first one was operated out of a rented house in 1891. Architects Gregory Villanueva and Oscar Arnoni designed the 64,000-square-foot (5,900 m^{2}) $6 million facility, which was named in honor of Rabbi Norman F. Feldheym. The library provides a number of cultural enrichment programs for youth and adults in the local community. Partnering with the San Bernardino City Unified School District, the library supports a community Reading Festival for third-graders and their families. The library also sponsors an annual book fair at Cal State San Bernardino, reading clubs, and an "Academy of Public Scholars" critical review club devoted to works of Continental philosophy.

== City Hall ==
San Bernardino's third City Hall was built by John M. Cooper in 1937-1938 and demolished in 1969.

San Bernardino's current City Hall, its fourth iteration, is a six-story building designed in 1963 by César Pelli to reflect the urban environment around it. Completed in 1972, the City Hall is modernist in style, has curtain walls, and is clad entirely in glass, with slim aluminum mullions. Parts of the building are raised off the ground by pilotis.

== Downtown universities ==
American Sports University was a private, non-profit sports business university in the downtown area which has remained unaccredited since its inception in 2006; it is seeking accreditation. It was granted approval to operate from the Bureau for Private Postsecondary and Vocational Education of the State of California. It closed in 2016.

California State University, San Bernardino has plans to open a downtown campus/center near the 2nd/E Street intersection.

== Transportation ==
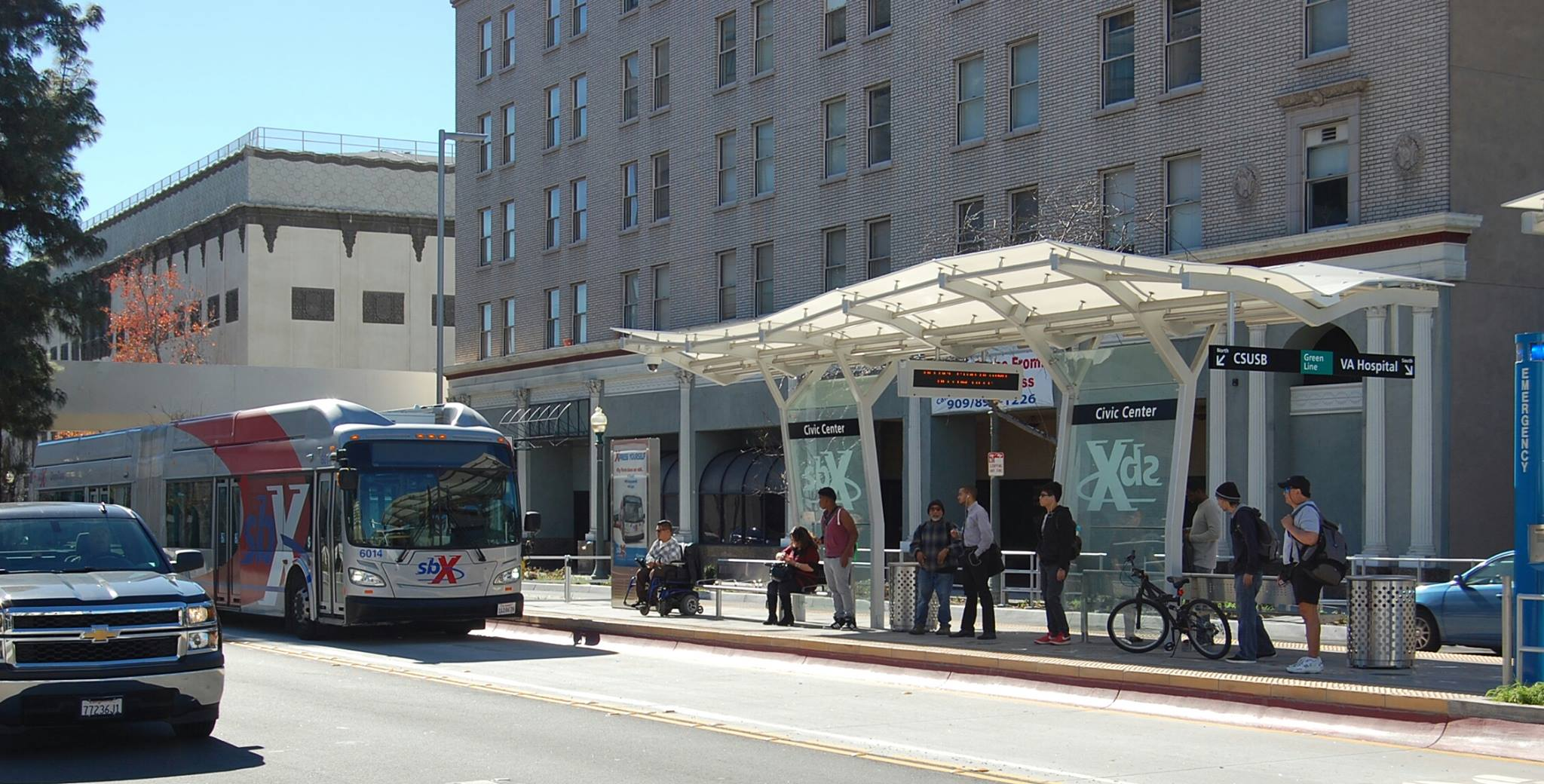
sbX Green Line's Civic Center Station in downtown San Bernardino, northernmost downtown stop.

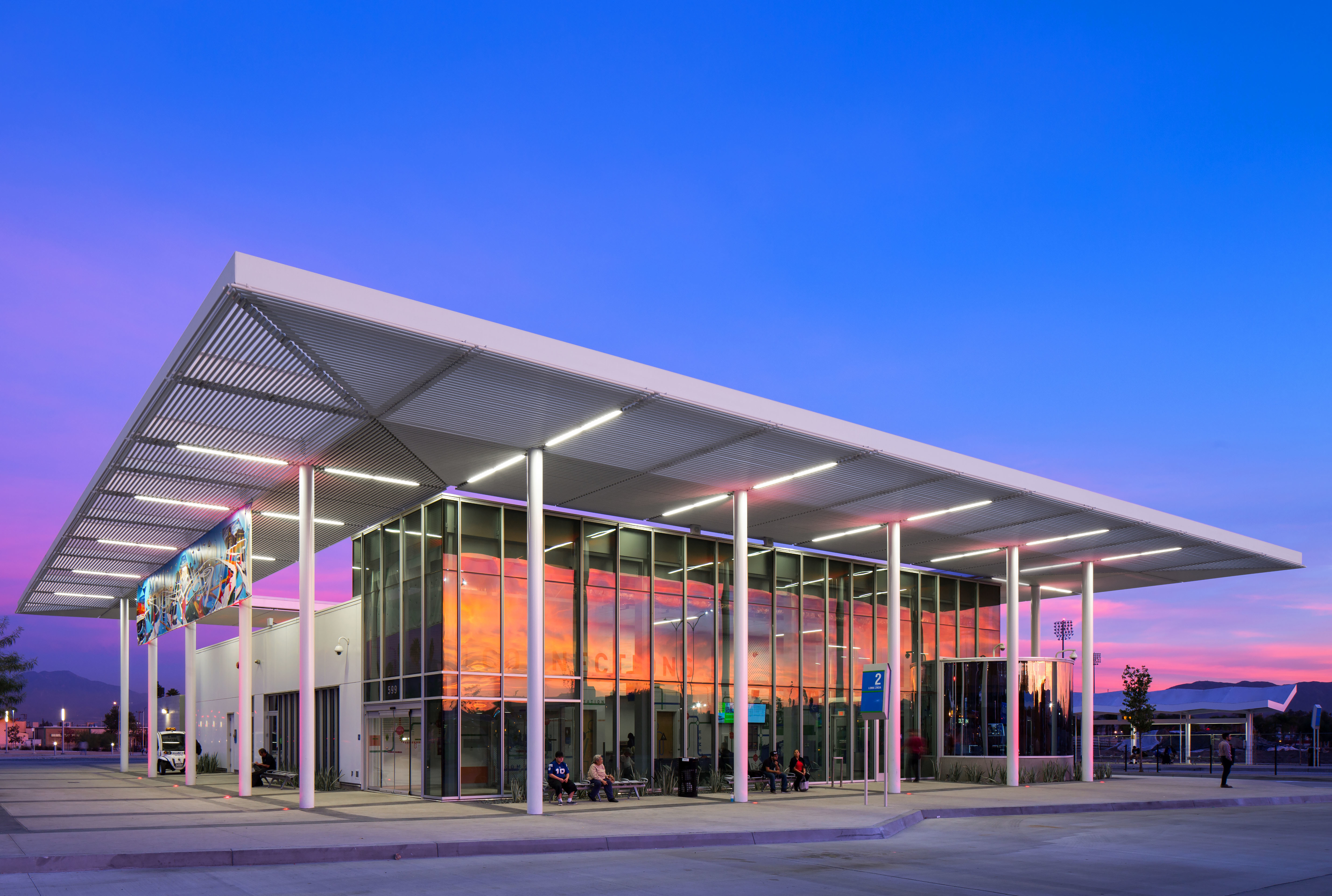
Downtown Transit Center

=== Transit Center ===
The Downtown Transit Center is located on a five-acre site located on the southwest corner of Rialto Avenue and E Street near the San Manuel Stadium. The Transit Center connects the Mountain Areas and the High Desert with the rest of Southern California, via Omnitrans, the Mountain Area Regional Transit Authority and the Victor Valley Transit Authority. It serves as a transfer point for bus routes the county, with connections to the sbX Bus Rapid Transit system, which connects Verdemont/California State University, San Bernardino to the Veterans Hospital in Loma Linda and the Downtown San Bernardino Passenger Rail System; which is a one-mile Metrolink extension from the Santa Fe Depot, and the Arrow commuter rail service with stops en route to the University of Redlands.

=== San Bernardino International Airport ===
The San Bernardino International Airport provides both domestic and international air services. Bus services serve the airport, which lies two miles (5 km) from downtown.

== Buildings ==
=== Main buildings ===
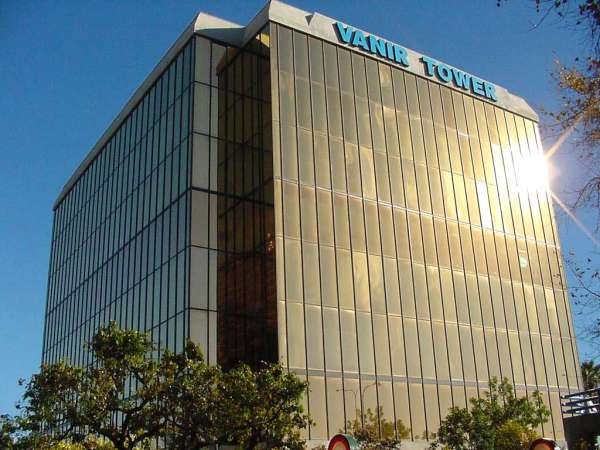
Vanir Tower

Rank	Name	Street address	Year	Use
1	San Bernardino Justice Center	West 3rd St., San Bernardino	2014	Government
2	Rosa Parks Memorial Building	464 West 4th St., San Bernardino	1998	Government
3	The Enterprise Building *as of 2017* (formerly known as: The Andreson Building)	320 North E St., San Bernardino	1927	Office Space and Entertainment Hub
4	Hotel & Convention Center	295 North E St., San Bernardino	1987	Hotel
5	St. Bernardine Plaza	Fifth St., San Bernardino		Residential
6	Vanir Tower	290 North D St., San Bernardino	1974	Office
7	San Bernardino City Hall	300 North D St., San Bernardino		Government
8	303 Building	303 West Third St. San Bernardino	1966	Government
9	The Heritage Building	440 W. Court St. San Bernardino	1946	

=== Other buildings ===
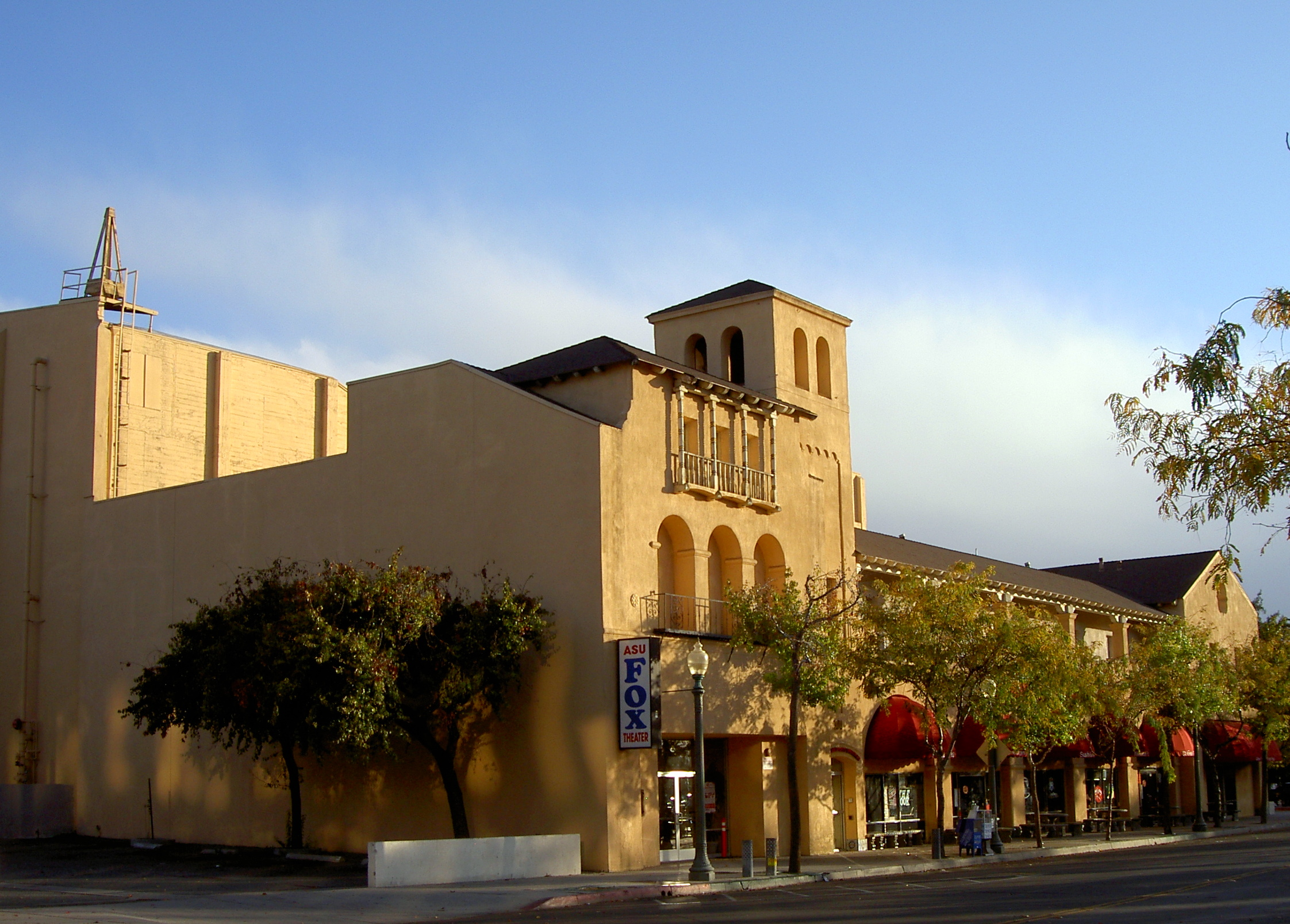
American Sports University's Fox Theatre

- San Bernardino Employment and Training Agency Building
- The Enterprise Building (formerly known as The Andreson Building)
- American Trust Building
- Bank Of America Building
- Wells Fargo Building
- Chase Building
- First American Title Building
- Building 505
- San Bernardino County Center Building
- County of San Bernardino Court 2 Building in 3rd Street
- County Records Tower
- Vanir Tower
- Norman F. Feldheym Central Library
- Medrobrook Tower

== Gallery ==
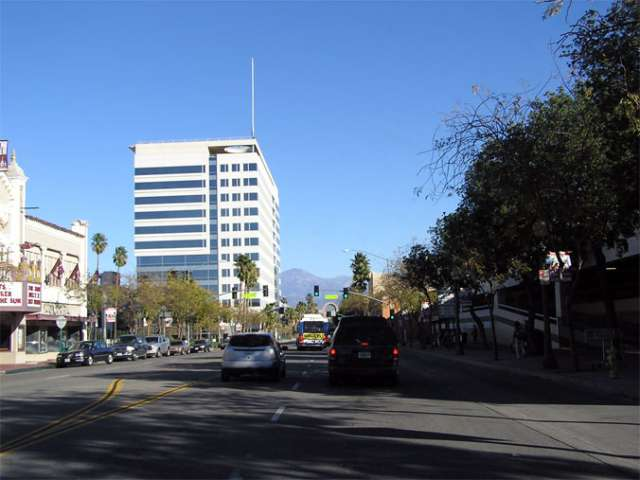
4th street dubbed "Broadway" at street level

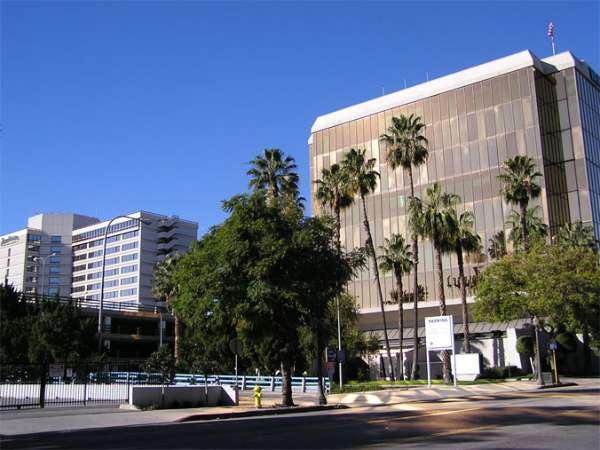
DowntownSan Bernardino in 2004

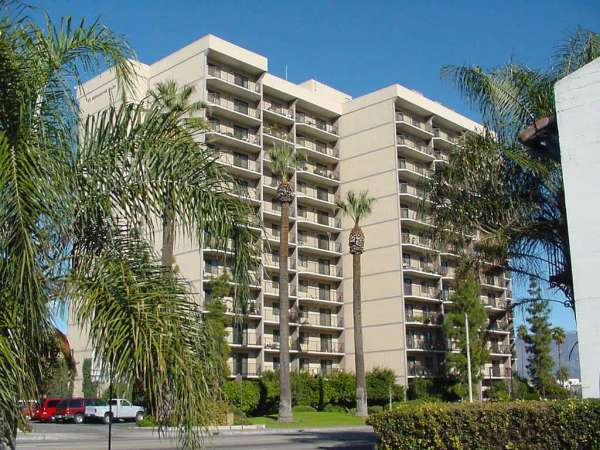
Building in Downtown called the San Bernardino Plaza

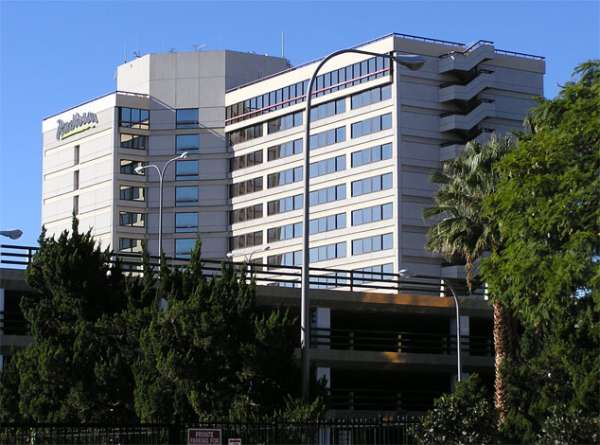
Downtown Hotel Tower 1

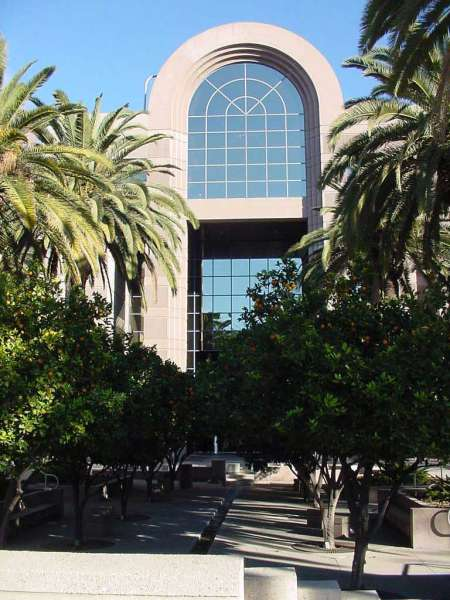
Court District of San Bernardino County called the Arrowhead Plaza

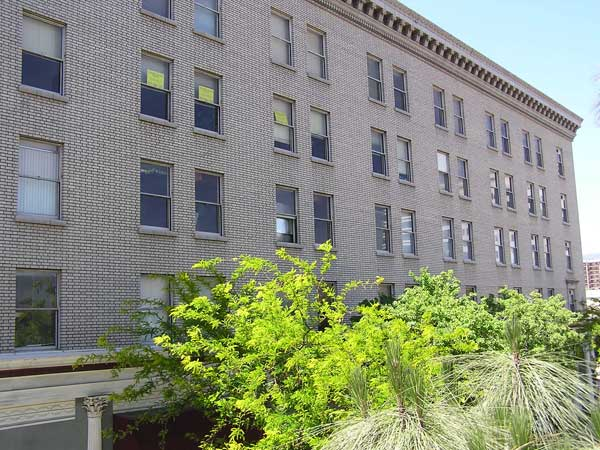
The Enterprise Building FKA The Andreson Building

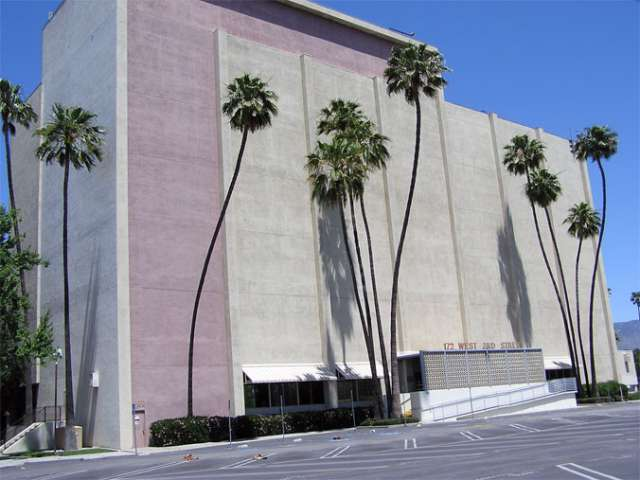
San Bernardino County Records Tower

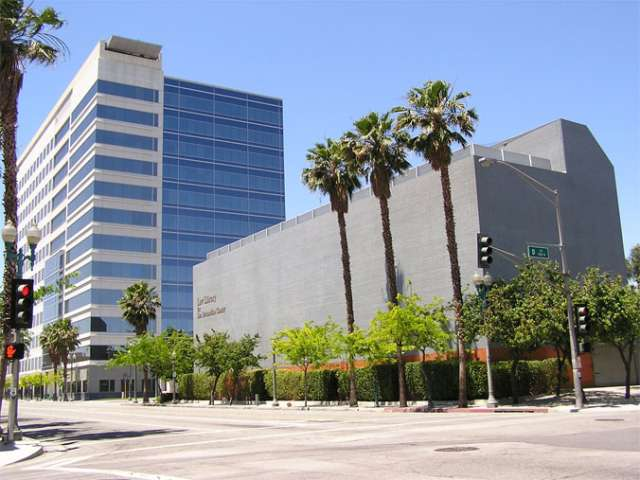
Rosa Parks Memorial Building next to the San Bernardino County Law Library

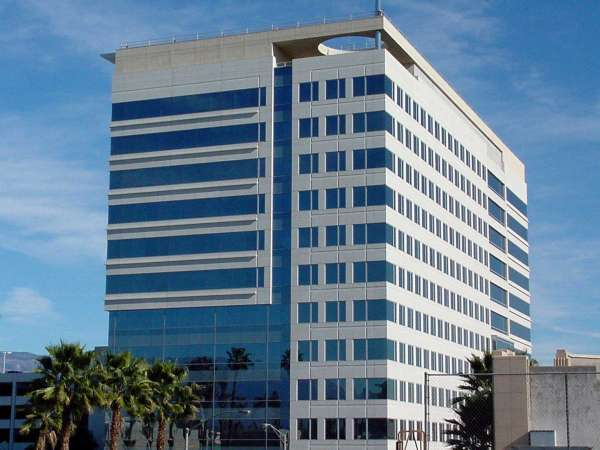
Rosa Parks Memorial Building view from mid-height

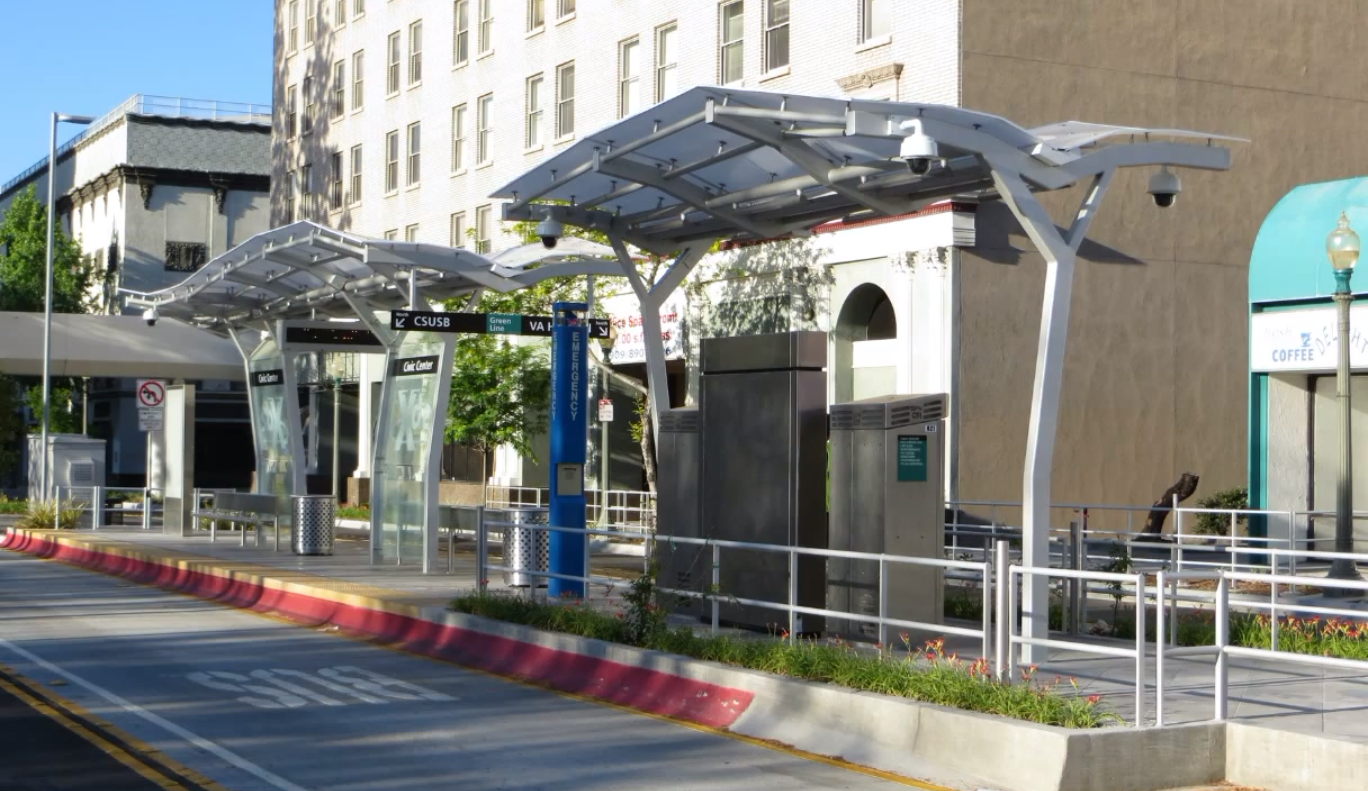
sbX Civic Centre Station

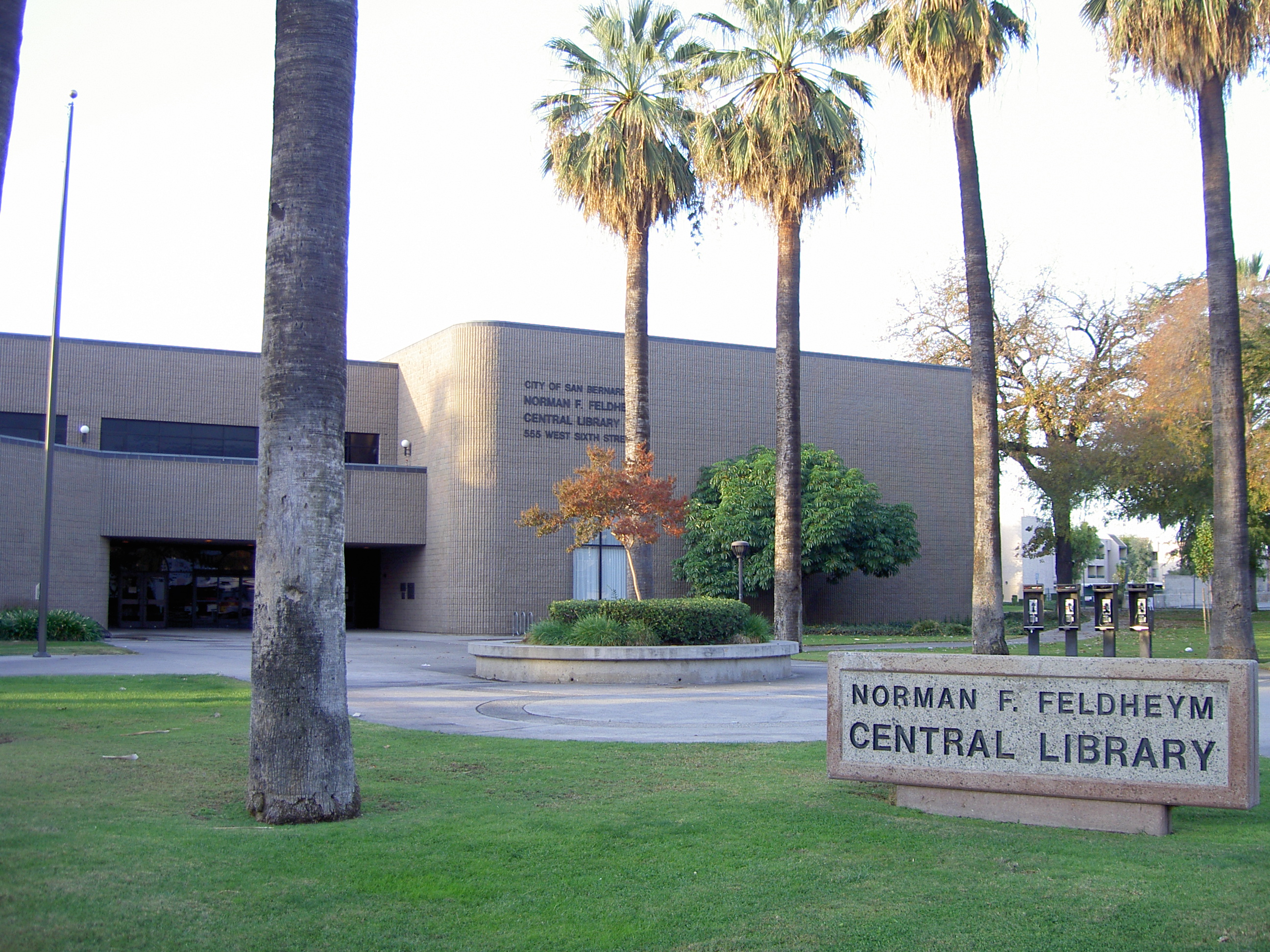
Central Library

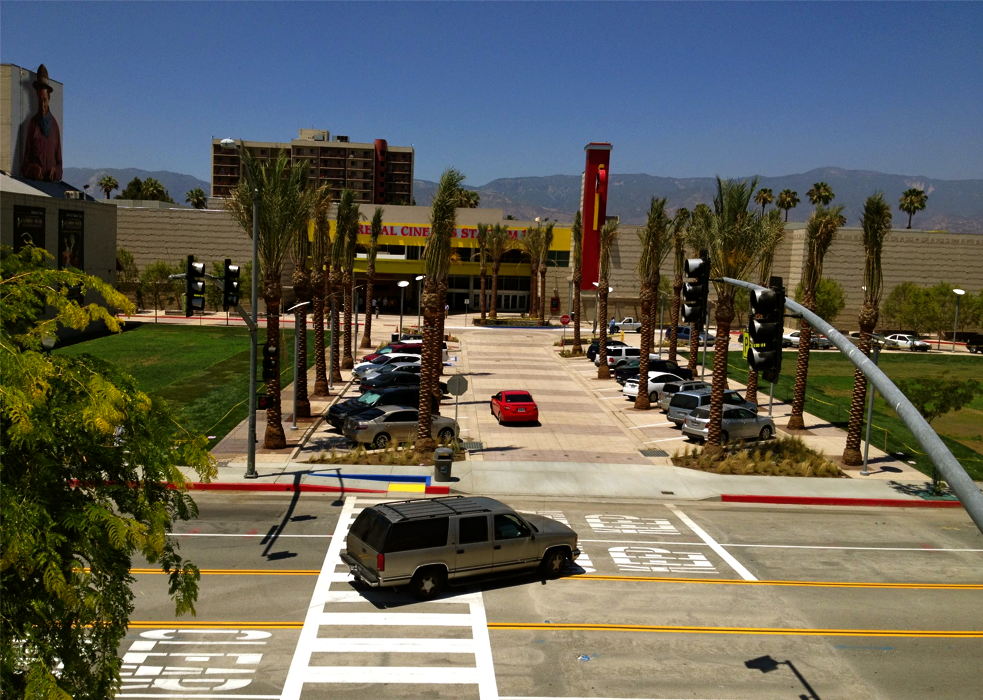
Regal Cinema at the Theater District
