= San Bernardino, California =

City in California, United States

- City
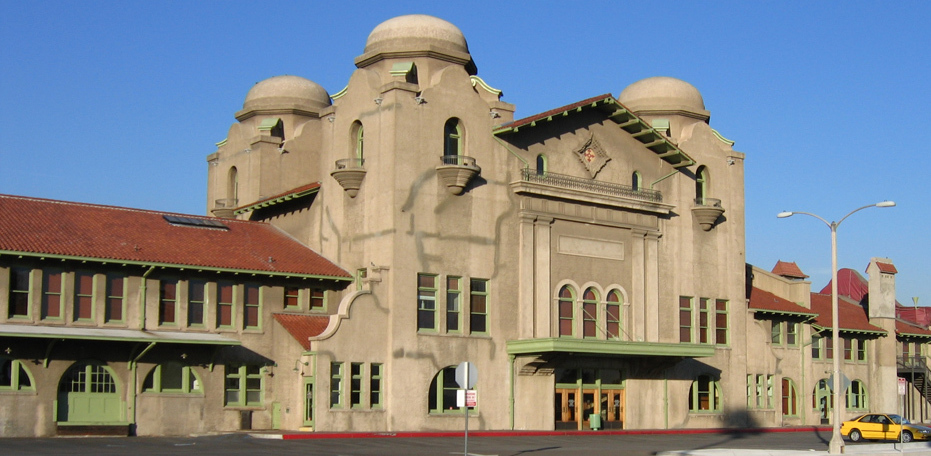
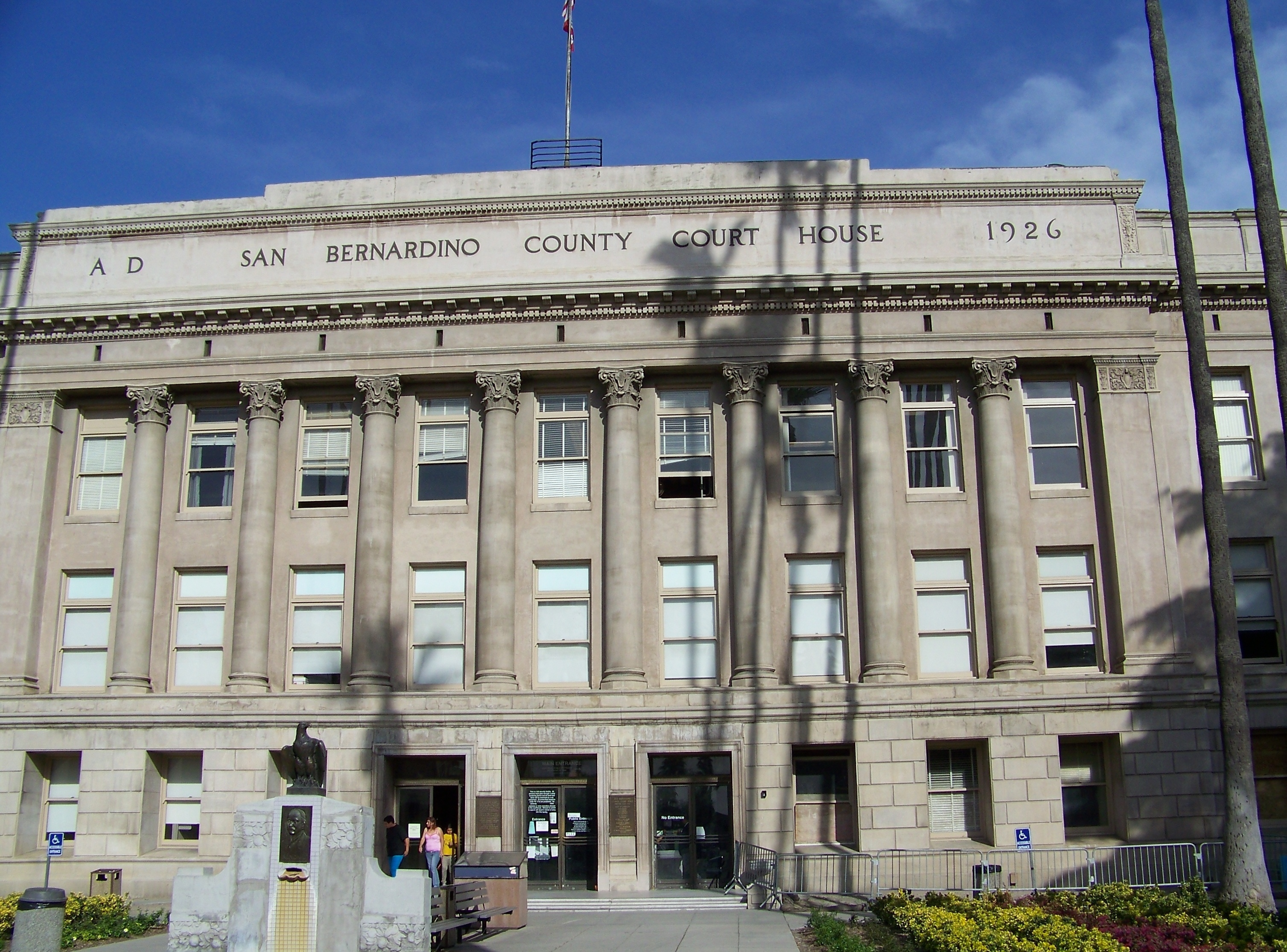
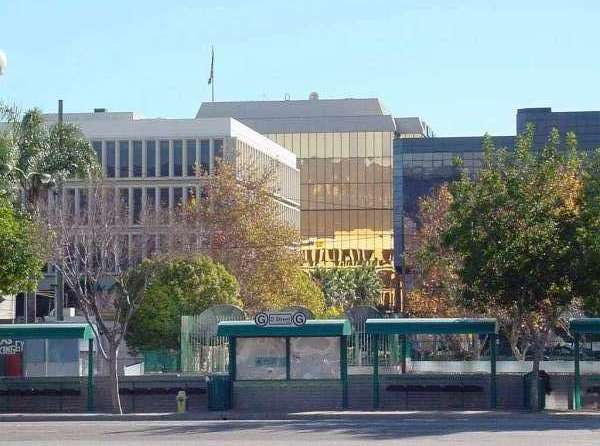
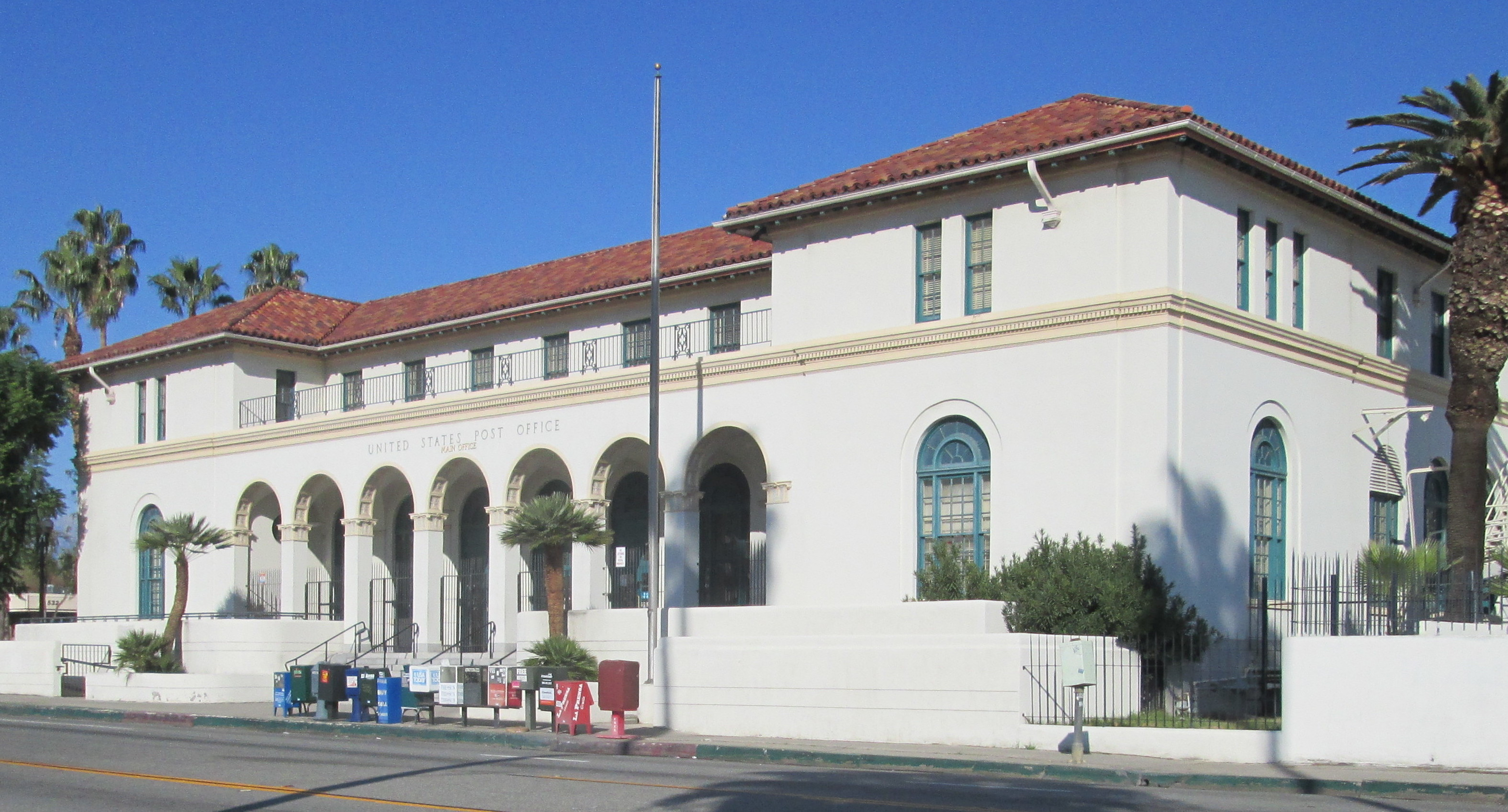
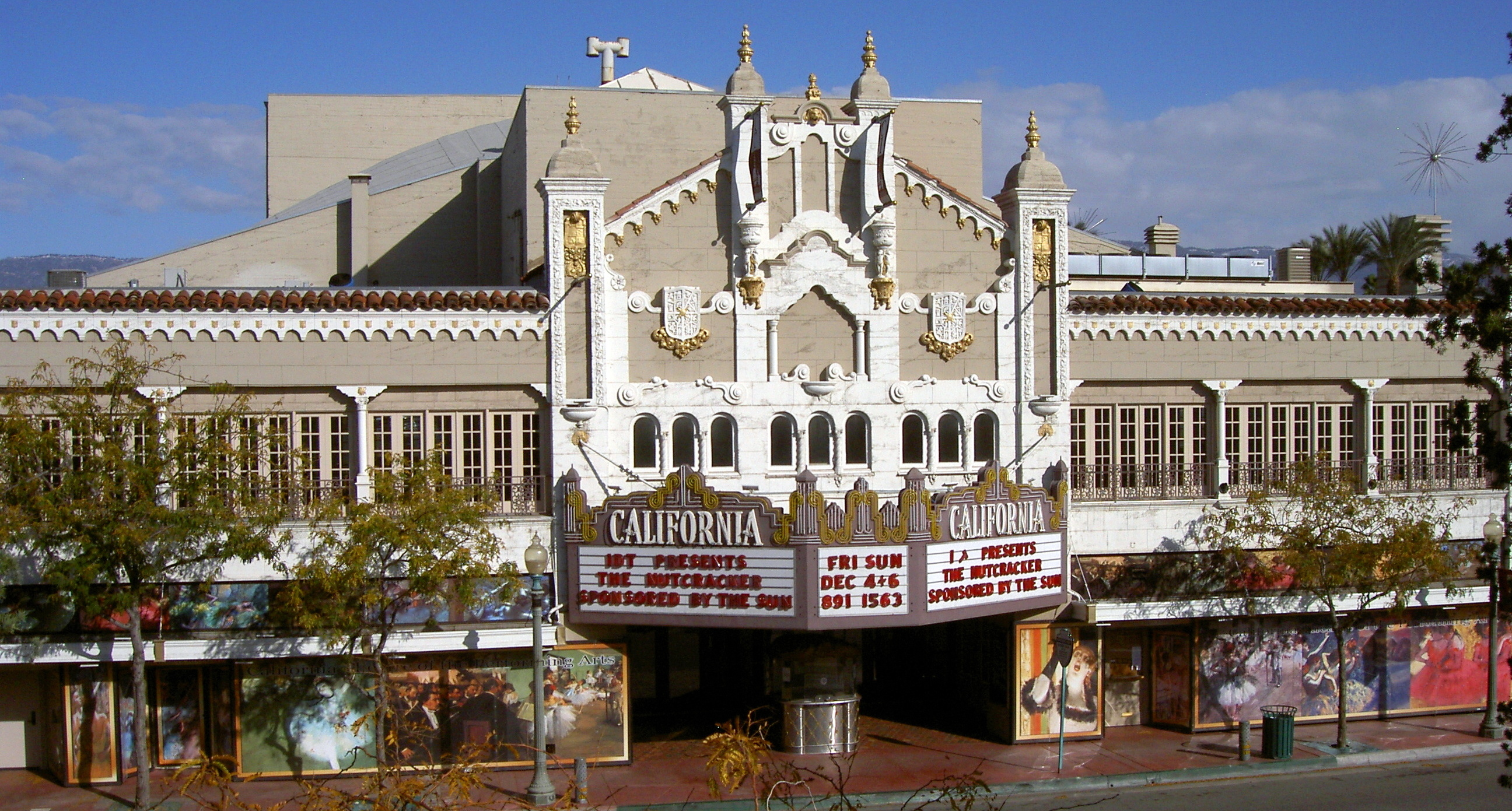
- San Bernardino Santa Fe Depot San Bernardino County Courthouse Downtown San Bernardino U.S. Post Office California Theatre

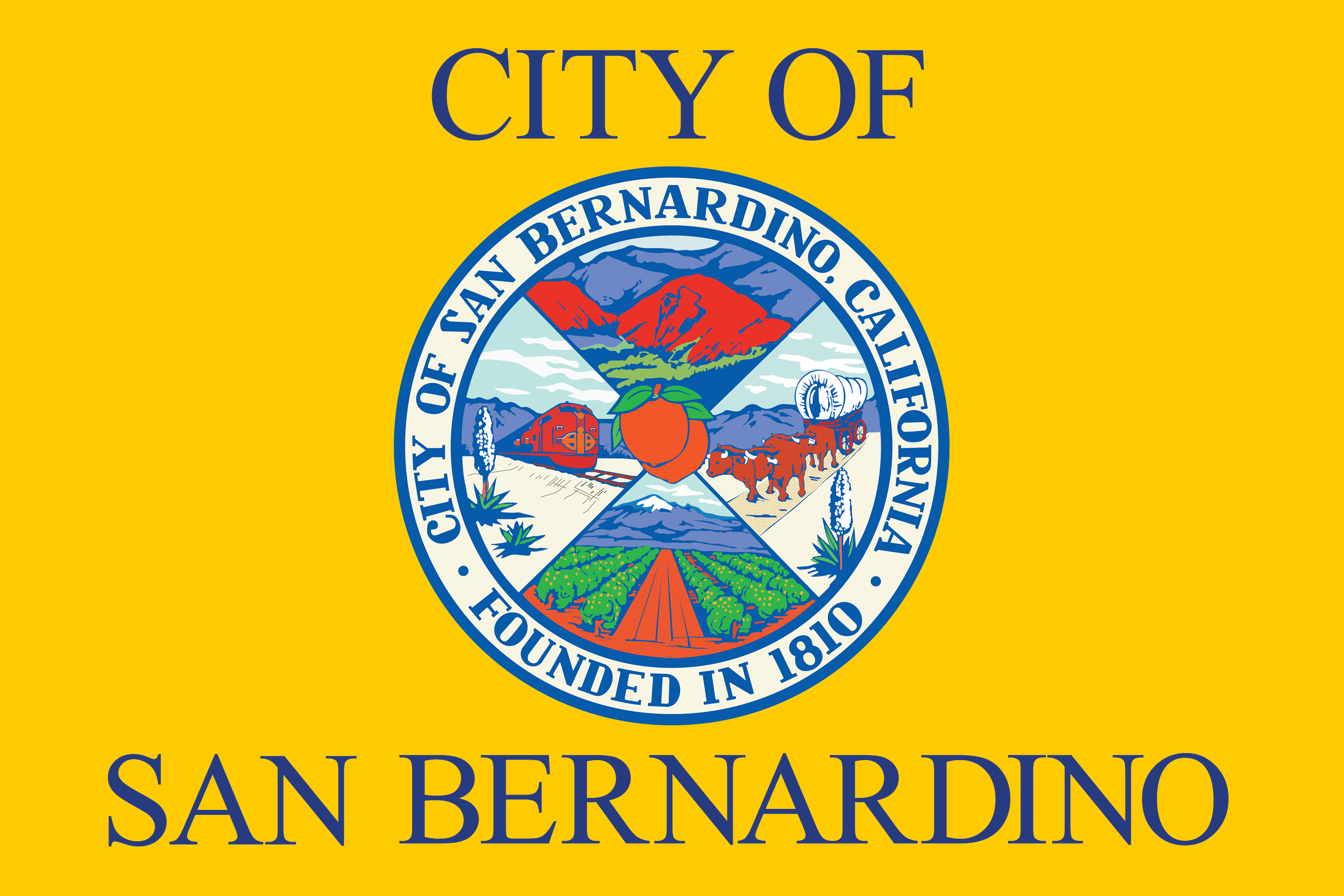
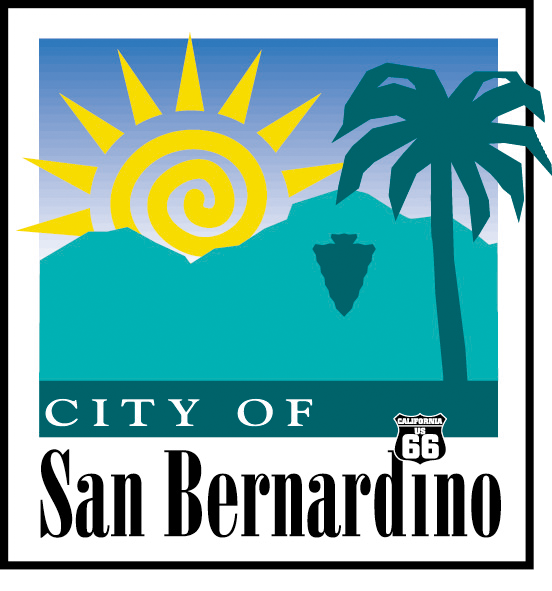
- Flag Seal Logo
- Nicknames: SB; San Berdoo; Berdoo; Gate City; City on the Move; The Friendly City; The Heart of Southern California; The 'Dino
- Interactive map of San Bernardino, California
- Location within California Location within the United States
- Coordinates: 34°6′15″N 117°17′32″W
- Country: United States
- State: California
- Metropolitan statistical area: San Bernardino/Riverside
- Urban Area: Greater San Bernardino Area
- County: San Bernardino
- Incorporated: August 10, 1869
- Named for: Bernardino of Siena

Government
  - Type: Council-manager
  - Mayor: Helen Tran (D)
  - Mayor Pro Tempore: Juan Figueroa
  - City manager: Eric Levitt
  - City attorney: Sonia R. Carvalho

Area
  - City: 62.46 sq mi (161.77 km^{2})
  - Land: 62.13 sq mi (160.92 km^{2})
  - Water: 0.33 sq mi (0.85 km^{2}) 0.53%
- Elevation: 1,053 ft (321 m)

Population (2020)
  - City: 222,101
  - Rank: 1st in San Bernardino County; 18th in California; 107th in the United States
  - Density: 3,575/sq mi (1,380.2/km^{2})
  - Metro: 4,744,214 (US: 12th)
- Time zone: UTC−08:00 (PST)
  - Summer (DST): UTC−07:00 (PDT)
- ZIP Codes: 92401–92408, 92410–92415, 92418, 92420, 92423, 92424, 92427
- Area code: 909, 840, 760
- FIPS code: 06-65000
- GNIS feature IDs: 1661375, 2411777
- Website: sanbernardino.gov

San Bernardino (/ˌsæn ˌbɜːrnəˈdiːnoʊ/ SAN BUR-nə-DEE-noh; Spanish: [ˌsãm beɾ.naɾˈð̞i.no]) is a city in and the county seat of San Bernardino County, California, United States. Located in the Inland Empire region of Southern California, the city had a population of 222,101 in the 2020 census, making it the 18th–most populous city in California. The Riverside–San Bernardino metropolitan area at 4.74 million residents is the 12th-largest metropolitan area in the nation. San Bernardino is the economic, cultural, and political hub of the San Bernardino Valley, sharing that distinction for the wider Inland Empire with its twin city of Riverside.

San Bernardino was named in 1810, when Spanish priest Francisco Dumetz led an expedition through the area. In 1839, the Mexican government granted Californio ranchero José del Carmen Lugo the right to settle the area, which was formalized when he was granted Rancho San Bernardino in 1842. Following the American Conquest of California, the largely unsettled rancho was purchased by Mormon settlers who founded the town of San Bernardino in 1851, later incorporated as a city in 1854. After most of the Mormons left in 1857, the city grew significantly in the late 19th century as a commercial hub at the crossroads between Southern California and the American Southwest. Today, San Bernardino is an important hub for the Inland Empire and Southern California. The governments of El Salvador, Guatemala, and Mexico have established the metropolitan area's only consulates in the downtown area. Furthermore, the city's University District serves as a college town, as it is home to California State University, San Bernardino.

== History ==
=== Indigenous ===
The city of San Bernardino, California, occupies much of the San Bernardino Valley, a valley long inhabited by the Tongva. Several of their villages dotted the San Bernardino valley prior to the arrival of Europeans in the valley. Kaawchama was perhaps the most significant in the region, being a regional center for trade that was connected to villages in Southern California and the Colorado River through the Mohave Trail, that was used by the Mohave, Serrano, Cahuilla, Payomkawichum, and others. The village was located in the eastern expanse of Tovaangar, and was established along the Santa Ana River.

=== Spanish and Mexican era ===
With the establishment of Mission San Gabriel in 1771, Spanish missionaries traveling through the area expressed a desire to establish a supply station in the area, which became the Guachama Rancheria. The settlement was also referred to as Politana and became the first Spanish settlement in what they referred to as San Bernardino Valley, named for Bernardino of Siena, being established in 1810 as a mission chapel and supply station by the Mission San Gabriel.

Two years later the settlement was destroyed by local tribesmen, following powerful earthquakes that shook the region. Several years later, the Serrano and Mountain Cahuilla rebuilt the Guachama Rancheria, and in 1819 invited the missionaries to return to the valley. They did and established the San Bernardino de Sena Estancia. Serrano and Cahuilla people inhabited Politana until long after the 1830s decree of secularization and the 1842 inclusion into the Rancho San Bernardino land grant of the José del Carmen Lugo family.

=== Post-Conquest era ===
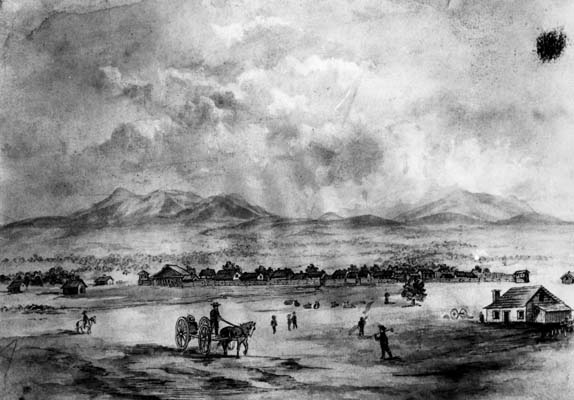
View of Fort San Bernardino in 1852

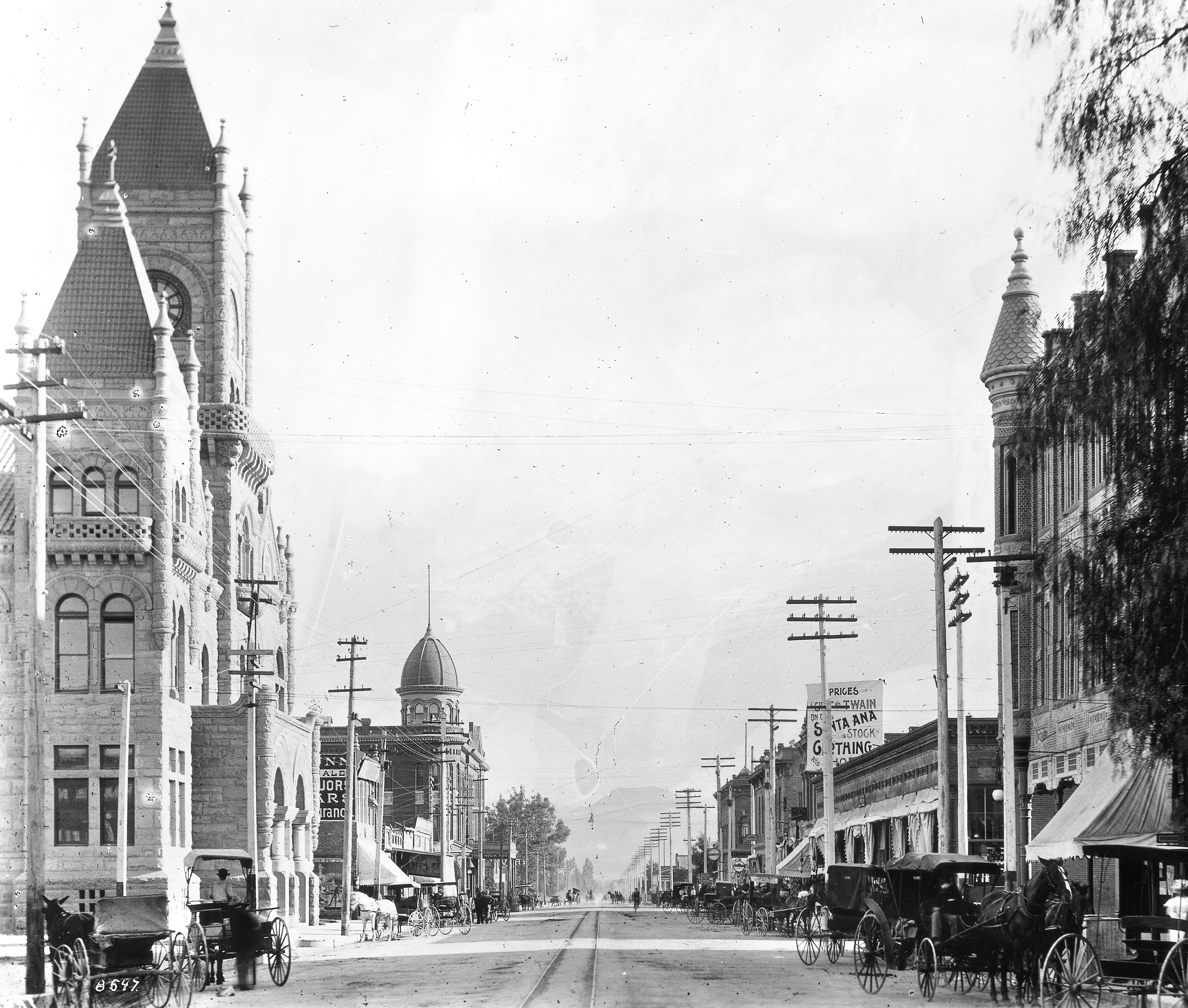
Downtown San Bernardino in 1905

The area was not largely settled until 1851, following the American Conquest of California. The first Anglo-American colony was established by pioneers associated with the Church of Jesus Christ of Latter-day Saints in 1851. San Bernardino County was formed in 1853 from parts of Los Angeles County. Mormons laid out the town based on the "City of Zion" plan which was typical of Mormon urban planning. Mormon colonists developed irrigated, commercial farming and lumbering, supplying agricultural produce and lumber throughout Southern California.

The city was officially incorporated in 1857. Later that year, most of the colonists were recalled by Brigham Young in 1857 due to the Utah War. Some Mormons would stay in San Bernardino and some later returned from Utah, but a real estate consortium from El Monte and Los Angeles bought most of the lands of the old rancho and of the departing colonists. They sold these lands to new settlers who came to dominate the culture and politics in the county, and San Bernardino became a typical American frontier town. Many of the new land owners disliked the sober Mormons, indulging in drinking at saloons now allowed in the town. Disorder, fighting and violence in the vicinity became common, reaching a climax in the 1859 Ainsworth–Gentry Affair.

In 1860 a gold rush began in the mountains nearby with the discovery of gold by William F. Holcomb in Holcomb Valley early 1860. Another strike followed in the upper reach of Lytle Creek. By the 1860s, San Bernardino had also become an important trading hub in Southern California. The city, already on the Los Angeles – Salt Lake Road, became the starting point for the Mojave Road from 1858 and Bradshaw Trail from 1862 to the mines along the Colorado River and within the Arizona Territory in the gold rush of 1862–1864.

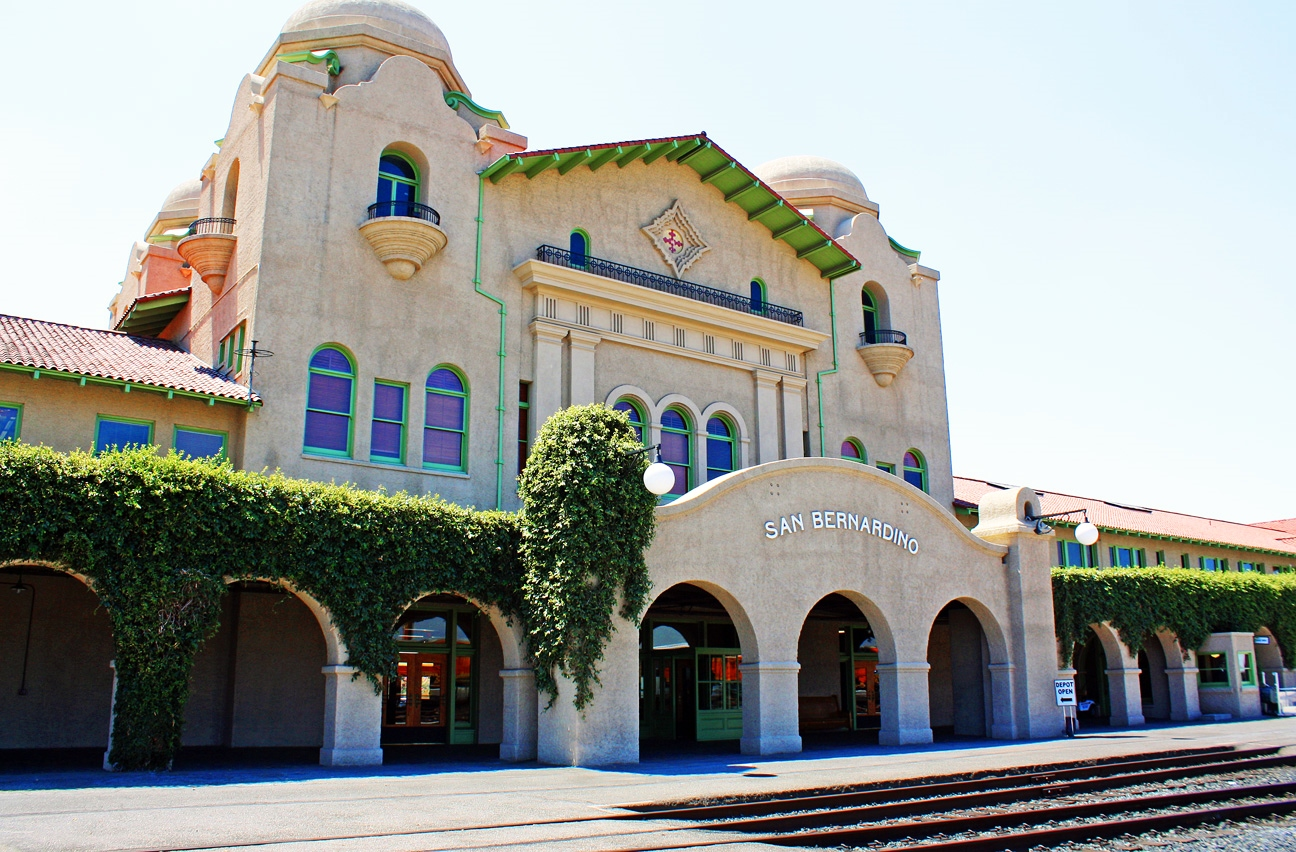
San Bernardino's Santa Fe Depot, built in 1918 in a Mission Revival style

In a 2007 report in The California Geographer, however, California State University, San Bernardino geography professor Norman Meek noted that the first direct record of the feature appeared in an 1864 photograph taken shortly after the establishment of the health resort by David Noble Smith at the hot springs. No mention of the arrowhead appears in any records of Spanish travelers in the area in the 18th or early 19th centuries, nor in records of Mormon settlement in the area in the 1850s, nor in the first scientific geological survey conducted in the area of the feature in 1853. Meek conducted analysis of soil samples, finding no significant difference in substrate composition of arrowhead itself compared to its surroundings aside from increased traces of fire retardant chemicals used for wildfire control, casting doubt on the hypothesis that the feature could be explained as a purely natural formation. Based on this, and the sudden increase in reports and purported legends of the arrowhead in late 19th century reporting and advertising for the resort, Meek contended that "the arrowhead may be a human-made advertisement created sometime in the late 1850s or early 1860s, perhaps by the founder of the hot springs resort". He suggested that the feature may have been constructed with the help of local native tribespeople, possibly modifying a landslide scar.

By 1889, word of the springs, along with the hotel on the site (and a belief in the effect on general health of the water from the springs) had grown considerably. Hotel guests often raved about the crystal-clear water from the cold springs, which prompted Seth Marshall to set up a bottling operation in the hotel's basement. By 1905, water from the cold springs was being shipped to Los Angeles under the newly created "Arrowhead" trademark.

Indigenous people of the San Bernardino Valley and Mountains were collectively identified by Spanish explorers in the 19th century as Serrano, a term meaning highlander. Serrano living near what is now Big Bear Lake were called Yuhaviatam, or "People of the Pines". In 1866, to clear the way for settlers and gold miners, state militia conducted a 32-day campaign slaughtering men, women, and children. Yuhaviatam leader Santos Manuel guided his people from their ancient homeland to a village site in the San Bernardino foothills. The United States government in 1891 established it as a tribal reservation and named it after Santos Manuel.

In 1867, the first Chinese immigrants arrived in San Bernardino.

In 1883, California Southern Railroad established a rail link through San Bernardino between Los Angeles and the rest of the country.

=== Modern era ===
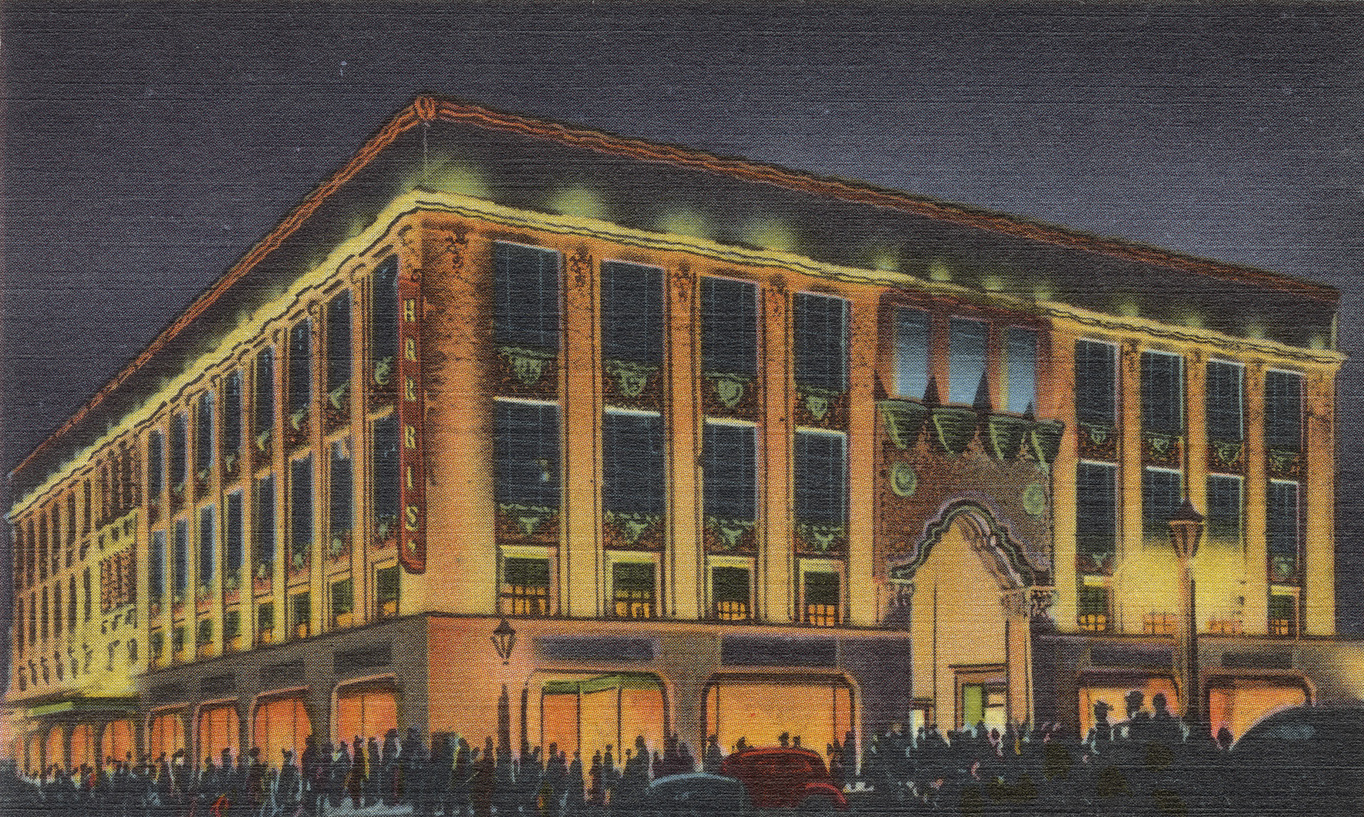
The historic California Churrigueresque-style Harris Department Store in 1940

In 1905, the city of San Bernardino passed its first charter.

Norton Air Force Base was established during World War II. In 1994, Norton Air Force Base closed to become San Bernardino International Airport.

In 1940, Richard and Maurice McDonald founded McDonald's, along with its innovative restaurant concept, in the city. In 1955, Glen Bell started his first taco stand after learning from Gloria Hoyle at Mitla Café, later developing into the first Taco Bell.

San Bernardino won the All-America City award in 1977.

On May 12, 1989, a massive derailment took place along Duffy Street at the Muscoy area, when a Southern Pacific trona train lost control while descending the Cajon Pass. The disaster killed 4 people and destroyed seven homes. Then, on May 25, an underground petroleum pipeline ruptured, killing 2 more people and burning down 11 more homes.

In August 2012, San Bernardino filed for Chapter 9 bankruptcy, with more than $1 billion in debt. The move froze the city's payments to creditors, including its pension payments to the California Public Employees' Retirement System for nearly a year. San Bernardino became the largest city at the time to file for a Chapter 9 bankruptcy; this was superseded by Detroit's filing in July 2013. Following a judge's approval, the city emerged from bankruptcy in February 2017, making it one of the longest municipal bankruptcies in the United States.

On December 2, 2015, a terrorist attack left 14 people dead and 22 seriously injured.

== Geography ==
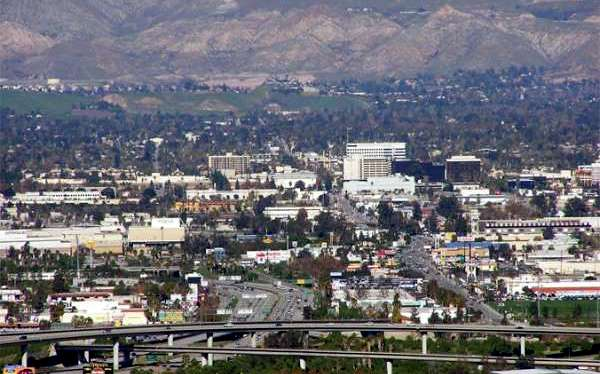
View of Downtown San Bernardino

According to the United States Census Bureau, the city has a total area of 62.5 square miles (162 km^{2}), of which 62.1 square miles (161 km^{2}) is land and 0.3 square miles (0.78 km^{2}), or 0.53%, is water.

The city lies in the San Bernardino foothills and the eastern portion of the San Bernardino Valley, roughly 60 miles (97 km) east of Los Angeles. Some major geographical features of the city include the San Bernardino Mountains and the San Bernardino National Forest, in which the city's northernmost neighborhood, Arrowhead Springs, is located. At the base of the mountains lies the San Andreas Fault, which passes through the northern areas of the city, and where several smaller faults lie in close proximity. The Cajon Pass adjacent to the northwest border; City Creek, Lytle Creek, San Timoteo Creek, Twin Creek, Warm Creek (as modified through flood control channels) feed the Santa Ana River, which forms part of the city's southern border south of San Bernardino International Airport. The city has several notable hills and mountains; among them are Perris Hill (named after Fred Perris, an early engineer, and the namesake of Perris, California); Kendall Hill (which is near California State University); and Little Mountain, which rises among Shandin Hills (generally bounded by Sierra Way, 30th Street, Kendall Drive, and Interstate 215).

San Bernardino is unique among Southern Californian cities because of its wealth of water, which is mostly contained in underground aquifers.

Seccombe Lake is a man-made lake at Sierra Way and 5th Street. It is named after a former mayor.

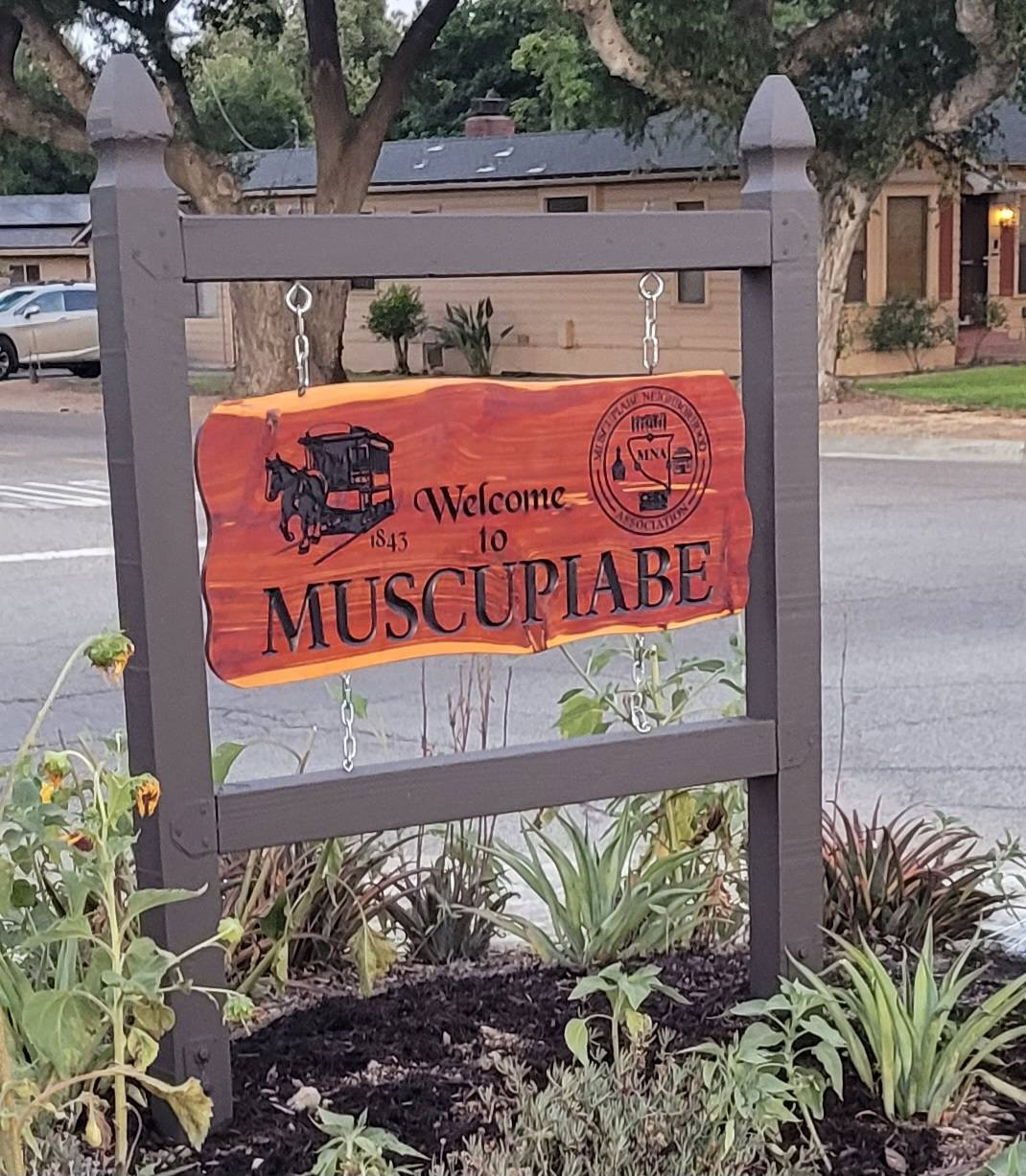
Muscupiabe

Muscupiabe is a suburban neighborhood in the city, located about 3 mi (4.8 km) north of the civic center. Its name comes from the Indigenous Serrano meaning "place of little pines" due to its location near the Cajon mountain pass' pine trees. Muscupiabe borders three California freeways, California State Route 210, California State Route 259 and I-215, hence the neighborhood's nickname, the Triangle. Muscupiabe is primarily home to single family homes with large lots, mature leafy willows, and tall pines.

=== Climate ===
January snowfall in the eastern San Bernardino Valley, Shandin Hills are visible in the background.

San Bernardino features a hot-summer Mediterranean climate (Csa in the Köppen climate classification) with warm winters and hot, dry summers. Relative to other areas in Southern California, winters are colder. Frost and chilly-to-cold morning temperatures are common during the winters. The particularly arid climate during the summer prevents tropospheric clouds from forming. As a result, summer temperatures rise to highs typical of hot desert climates, with the highest recorded summer temperature at 118 °F (48 °C) on July 6, 2018. July is the hottest month on average, and December the coolest.

In the winter, snow flurries occur upon occasion. San Bernardino gets an average of 16 inches (406 mm) of rain, hail, or light snow showers each year. Arrowhead Springs, San Bernardino's northernmost neighborhood gets snow, heavily at times, due to its elevation of about 3,000 feet (910 m) above sea level.

The seasonal Santa Ana winds are felt particularly strongly in the San Bernardino area as warm and dry air is channeled through nearby Cajon Pass at times during the autumn months. In extreme cases, the winds approach speeds of 60 miles per hour (97 km/h), downing power lines and causing property damage. The winds, along with the cycle of cold wet winters and hot dry summers, markedly increase the danger of wildfire in the foothill, canyon and mountain communities.

Climate data for San Bernardino, California, 1981–2010 normals, extremes 1893–2004
Month	Jan	Feb	Mar	Apr	May	Jun	Jul	Aug	Sep	Oct	Nov	Dec	Year
Record high °F (°C)	94 (34)	93 (34)	97 (36)	103 (39)	112 (44)	116 (47)	116 (47)	116 (47)	117 (47)	111 (44)	99 (37)	93 (34)	117 (47)
Mean daily maximum °F (°C)	68.4 (20.2)	69.2 (20.7)	72.7 (22.6)	77.8 (25.4)	83.4 (28.6)	90.1 (32.3)	96.2 (35.7)	97.3 (36.3)	92.8 (33.8)	84.0 (28.9)	74.3 (23.5)	67.1 (19.5)	81.1 (27.3)
Daily mean °F (°C)	55.6 (13.1)	56.5 (13.6)	59.2 (15.1)	63.5 (17.5)	68.9 (20.5)	74.3 (23.5)	79.9 (26.6)	80.7 (27.1)	76.8 (24.9)	69.0 (20.6)	59.9 (15.5)	54.4 (12.4)	66.6 (19.2)
Mean daily minimum °F (°C)	42.8 (6.0)	43.8 (6.6)	45.7 (7.6)	49.2 (9.6)	54.3 (12.4)	58.5 (14.7)	63.6 (17.6)	64.2 (17.9)	60.8 (16.0)	54.1 (12.3)	45.5 (7.5)	41.8 (5.4)	52.0 (11.1)
Record low °F (°C)	16 (−9)	21 (−6)	26 (−3)	26 (−3)	33 (1)	37 (3)	42 (6)	40 (4)	36 (2)	29 (−2)	24 (−4)	19 (−7)	16 (−9)
Average precipitation inches (mm)	3.15 (80)	4.06 (103)	2.53 (64)	1.02 (26)	0.25 (6.4)	0.07 (1.8)	0.03 (0.76)	0.13 (3.3)	0.25 (6.4)	0.82 (21)	1.29 (33)	2.41 (61)	16.01 (406.66)
Average precipitation days (≥ 0.01 in)	6.0	7.2	6.8	3.2	1.7	0.6	0.5	0.5	1.4	2.4	3.2	4.8	38.3
Source 1: NOAA
Source 2: XMACIS2

== Demographics ==
Historical population
Census	Pop.	Note	%±
1880	1,673		—
1890	4,012		139.8%
1900	6,150		53.3%
1910	12,779		107.8%
1920	18,721		46.5%
1930	37,481		100.2%
1940	43,646		16.4%
1950	63,058		44.5%
1960	91,922		45.8%
1970	106,869		16.3%
1980	118,794		11.2%
1990	164,164		38.2%
2000	185,401		12.9%
2010	209,924		13.2%
2020	222,101		5.8%
U.S. Decennial Census

=== Racial and ethnic composition ===
San Bernardino, California – Racial and ethnic composition Note: the US Census treats Hispanic/Latino as an ethnic category. This table excludes Latinos from the racial categories and assigns them to a separate category. Hispanics/Latinos may be of any race.
Race / Ethnicity (NH = Non-Hispanic)	Pop 2000	Pop 2010	Pop 2020	% 2000	% 2010	% 2020
White alone (NH)	53,630	39,977	28,649	28.93%	19.04%	12.90%
Black or African American alone (NH)	29,654	29,897	26,134	15.99%	14.24%	11.77%
Native American or Alaska Native alone (NH)	1,129	867	742	0.61%	0.41%	0.33%
Asian alone (NH)	7,594	8,027	8,734	4.10%	3.82%	3.93%
Native Hawaiian or Pacific Islander alone (NH)	582	704	754	0.31%	0.34%	0.34%
Other race alone (NH)	288	361	1,123	0.16%	0.17%	0.51%
Mixed race or Multiracial (NH)	4,502	4,097	4,840	2.43%	1.95%	2.18%
Hispanic or Latino (any race)	88,022	125,994	151,125	47.48%	60.02%	68.04%
Total	185,401	209,924	222,101	100.00%	100.00%	100.00%

=== 2020 ===
The 2020 United States census reported that San Bernardino had a population of 222,101. The population density was 3,574.7 inhabitants per square mile (1,380.2/km^{2}). The racial makeup of San Bernardino was 24.2% White, 12.6% African American, 2.3% Native American, 4.2% Asian, 0.4% Pacific Islander, 39.6% from other races, and 16.8% from two or more races. Hispanic or Latino of any race were 68.0% of the population.

The census reported that 97.4% of the population lived in households, 1.2% lived in non-institutionalized group quarters, and 1.4% were institutionalized.

There were 63,545 households, out of which 45.6% included children under the age of 18, 41.9% were married-couple households, 9.6% were cohabiting couple households, 30.3% had a female householder with no partner present, and 18.3% had a male householder with no partner present. 18.3% of households were one person, and 7.6% were one person aged 65 or older. The average household size was 3.4. There were 48,167 families (75.8% of all households).

The age distribution was 28.1% under the age of 18, 11.3% aged 18 to 24, 28.7% aged 25 to 44, 21.7% aged 45 to 64, and 10.1% who were 65 years of age or older. The median age was 31.2 years. For every 100 females, there were 96.6 males.

There were 66,147 housing units at an average density of 1,064.6 units per square mile (411.0 units/km^{2}), of which 63,545 (96.1%) were occupied. Of these, 48.5% were owner-occupied, and 51.5% were occupied by renters.

In 2023, the US Census Bureau estimated that the median household income was $63,988, and the per capita income was $23,980. About 15.9% of families and 19.5% of the population were below the poverty line.

=== 2010 ===
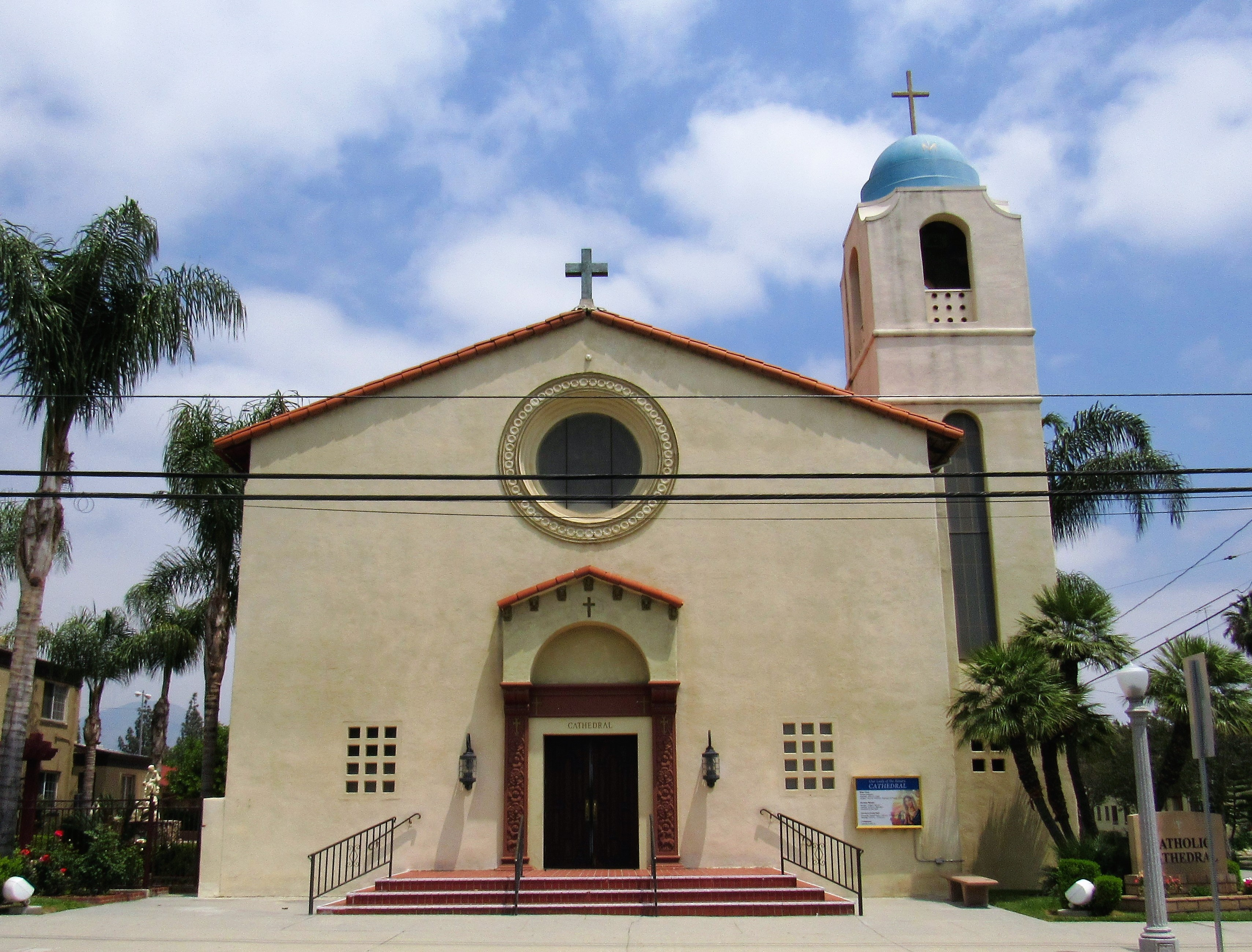
Our Lady of the Rosary Cathedral is the seat of the Roman Catholic Diocese of San Bernardino.

The 2010 United States census reported that San Bernardino had a population of 209,924. The population density was 3,519.6 inhabitants per square mile (1,358.9/km^{2}). The racial makeup of San Bernardino was 95,734 (45.6%) White (19.0% Non-Hispanic White), 31,582 (15.0%) African American, 2,822 (1.3%) Native American, 8,454 (4.0%) Asian, 839 (0.4%) Pacific Islander, 59,827 (28.5%) from other races, and 10,666 (5.1%) from two or more races. There were 125,994 Hispanic or Latino residents of any race (60.0%).

The Census reported that 202,599 people (96.5% of the population) lived in households, 3,078 (1.5%) lived in non-institutionalized group quarters, and 4,247 (2.0%) were institutionalized.

There were 59,283 households, out of which 29,675 (50.1%) had children under the age of 18 living in them, 25,700 (43.4%) were opposite-sex married couples living together, 13,518 (22.8%) had a female householder with no husband present, 5,302 (8.9%) had a male householder with no wife present. There were 5,198 (8.8%) unmarried opposite-sex partnerships, and 488 (0.8%) same-sex married couples or partnerships. 11,229 households (18.9%) were made up of individuals, and 4,119 (6.9%) had someone living alone who was 65 years of age or older. The average household size was 3.42. There were 44,520 families (75.1% of all households); the average family size was 3.89.

There were 67,238 residents (32.0%) under the age of 18, 26,654 (12.7%) aged 18 to 24, 56,221 (26.8%) aged 25 to 44, 43,277 (20.6%) aged 45 to 64, and 16,534 (7.9%) who were 65 years of age or older. The median age was 28.5 years. For every 100 females, there were 97.2 males. For every 100 females age 18 and over, there were 94.0 males.

There were 65,401 housing units at an average density of 1,096.5 units per square mile (423.4 units/km^{2}), of which 29,838 (50.3%) were owner-occupied, and 29,445 (49.7%) were occupied by renters. The homeowner vacancy rate was 3.2%; the rental vacancy rate was 9.5%. 102,650 people (48.9% of the population) lived in owner-occupied housing units and 99,949 people (47.6%) lived in rental housing units.

According to the 2010 United States Census, San Bernardino had a median household income of $39,097, with 30.6% of the population living below the federal poverty line.

=== Ethnic diversity ===
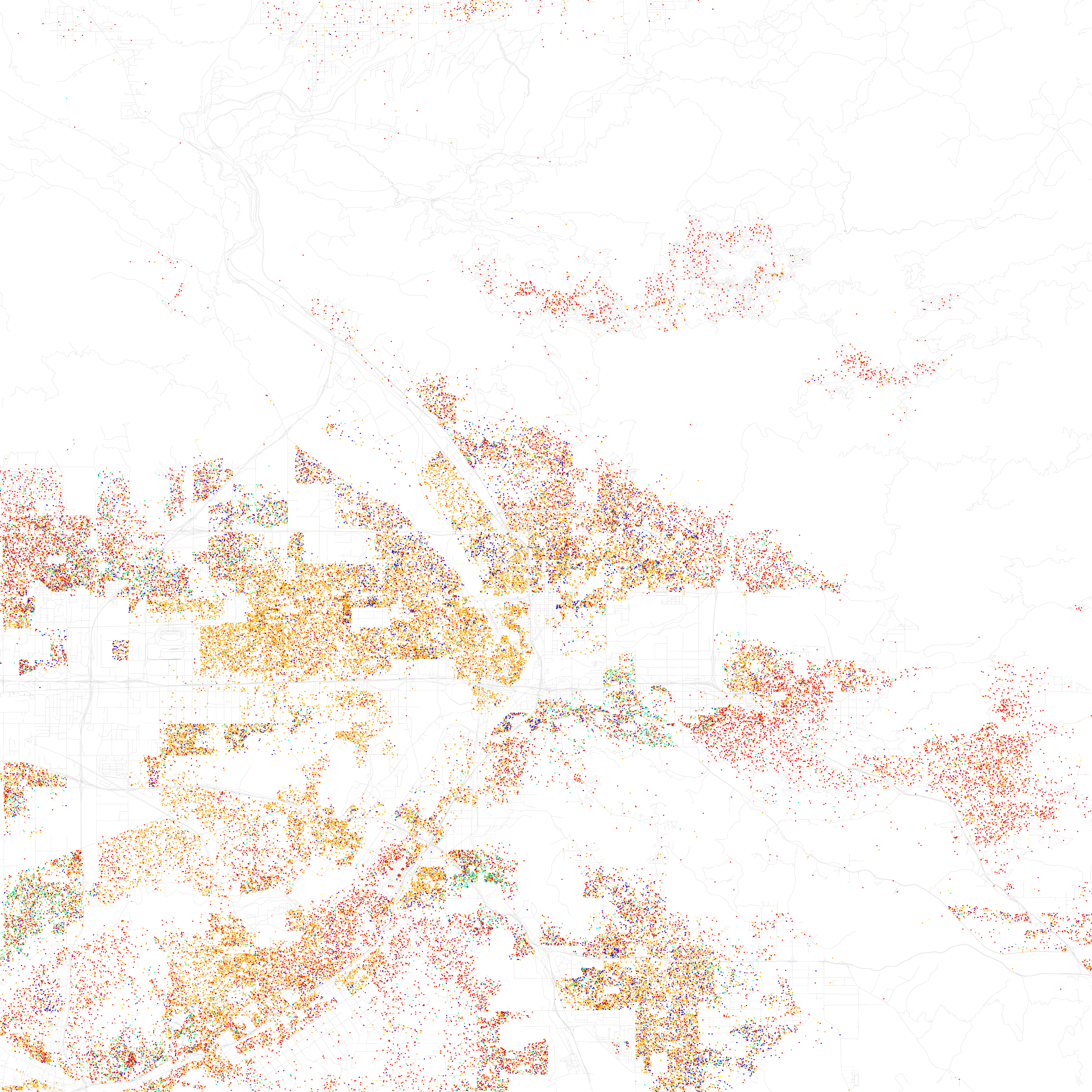
Map of racial distribution in San Bernardino, 2010 U.S. Census. Each dot is 25 people: ⬤ White ⬤ Black ⬤ Asian ⬤ Hispanic ⬤ Other

Western, central, and parts of eastern San Bernardino are home to mixed-ethnic working class populations, of which the Latino and African-American populations comprise the vast majority of the city. Historically, many Latinos, primarily Mexican-Americans and Mexicans, lived on Mount Vernon Avenue on the West Side. Since the 1960s, the Medical Center (formerly known as Muscoy) and Base Line corridors were mostly black, in particular in the east side and west side areas centering on public housing projects Waterman Gardens and the public housing on Medical Center drive. The heart of the Mexican-American community is on the West and Southside of San Bernardino, but is slowly expanding throughout the entire city. San Bernardino's only Jewish congregation moved to Redlands in December 2009.

Some Asian Americans live in and around the city of San Bernardino, as in a late 19th-century-era (gone) Chinatown and formerly Japanese-American area in Seccombe Park on the east end of downtown, and a large East-Asian community in North Loma Linda. Others live in nearby Loma Linda to the south across the Santa Ana River. Filipinos are the largest Asian ethnic group in San Bernardino. There is a historic Italian-American community in San Bernardino. There is a rapid increase of Guatemalan immigrants in San Bernardino and the Inland Empire. The white population in San Bernardino has declined while the Hispanic and Asian populations have increased.

Spanish and Tagalog, the former of which is spoken at home by 37.4% of San Bernardino County residents, are the most common spoken foreign languages. 54.3% of residents five years or older speak only English at home, and 45.7% speak another language.

Ancestry of San Bernardino County's population according to the 2022 American Community Survey
Name	% of citizens claiming ancestry
American	2.8
Arab	1.1
Czech	0.1
Danish	0.2
Dutch	0.6
English	4.2
French, excluding Basque	0.9
French Canadian	0.1
German	4.6
Hungarian	0.1
Irish	3.9
Italian	2.1
Lithuanian	0.1
Norwegian	0.6
Polish	0.6
Portuguese	0.3
Russian	0.2
Scotch-Irish	0.2
Scottish	0.7
Slovak	0.1
Subsaharan African	0.8
Swedish	0.4
Swiss	0.1
Ukrainian	0.1
Welsh	0.3
West Indian	0.3

== Economy ==
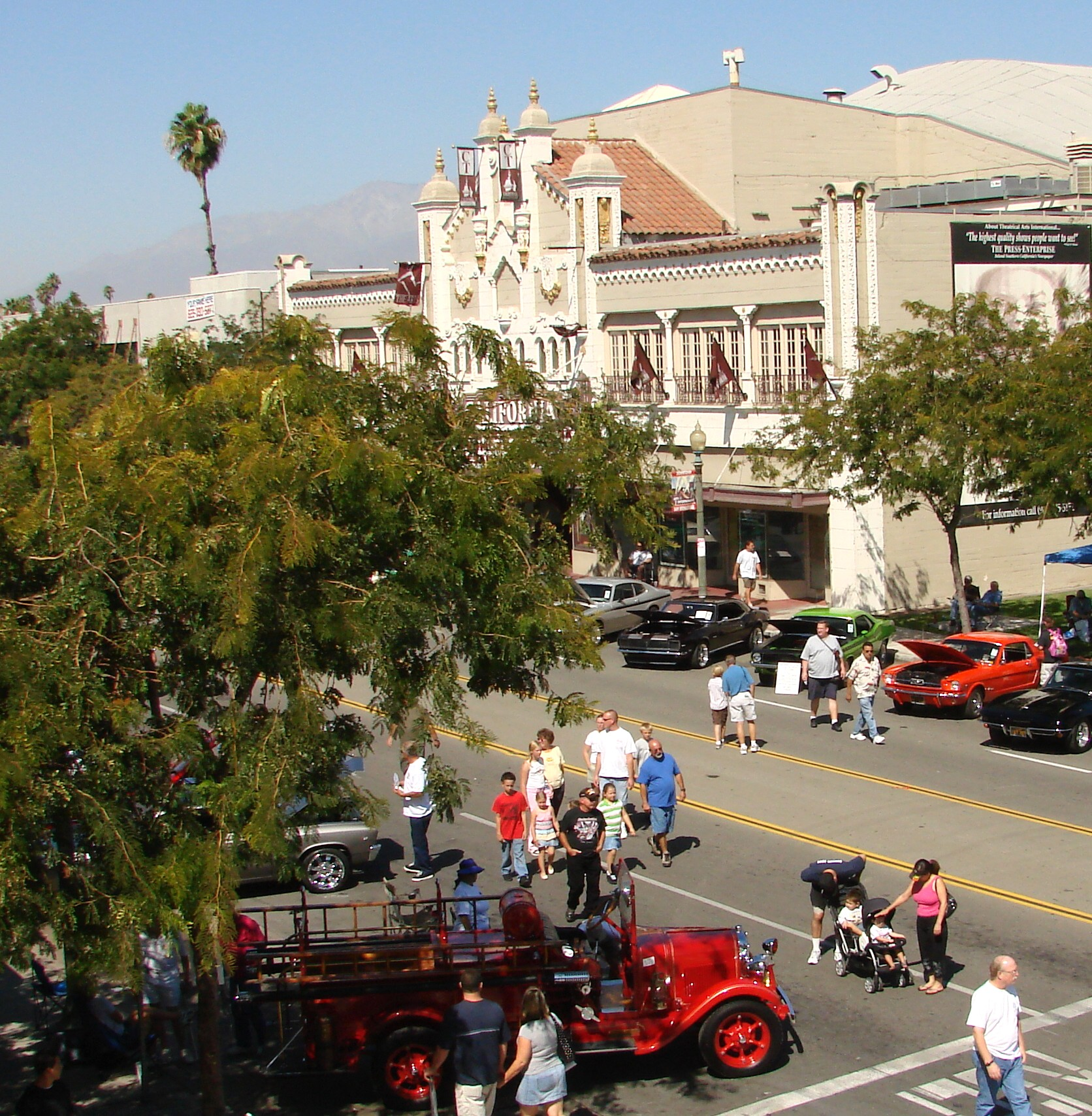
Event in Downtown San Bernardino

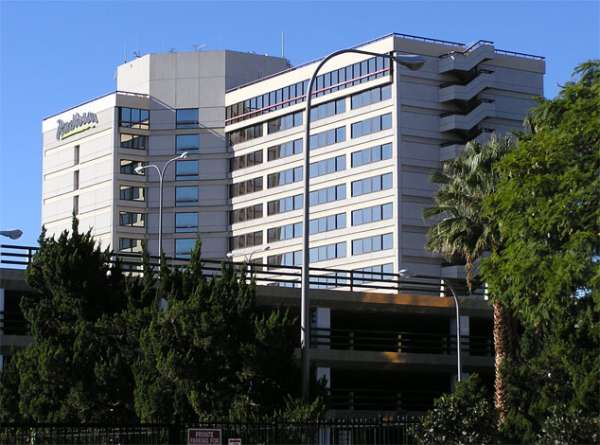
Hotel in Downtown San Bernardino

The city's location close to the Cajon and San Gorgonio passes, and at the junctions of the I-10, I-215, and SR-210 freeways, positions it as an intermodal logistics hub. The city hosts the Burlington Northern and Santa Fe Railway's intermodal freight transport yard, the Yellow Freight Systems' cross-docking trucking center, and Pacific Motor Trucking. Large warehouses for Kohl's, Mattel, Pep Boys, and Stater Bros. have been developed near the San Bernardino International Airport.

San Bernardino's economic decline can be traced to significant transportation shifts that redirected traffic and commerce. The relocation of the I-15 to run through Rancho Cucamonga and Ontario diverted Los Angeles and San Diego-bound traffic and shoppers away from the city. Meanwhile, the extension of the CA-210 east to Redlands created a more direct route to Palm Springs and Pasadena, further bypassing San Bernardino and steering regional growth toward neighboring cities.

The closing of Norton Air Force Base in 1994 resulted in the loss of 10,000 military and civilian jobs and sent San Bernardino's economy into a downturn that has been somewhat offset by more recent growth in the intermodal shipping industry. The jobless rate in the region rose to more than 12 percent during the years immediately after the base closing. As of 2007 households within one mile of the city core had a median income of only $20,480, less than half that of the Inland region as a whole. Over 15 percent of San Bernardino residents are unemployed as of 2012, and over 40 percent are on some form of public assistance. According to the US Census, 34.6 percent of residents lived below the poverty level in 2012, making San Bernardino the poorest city for its population in California, and the second-poorest in the United States (after Detroit).

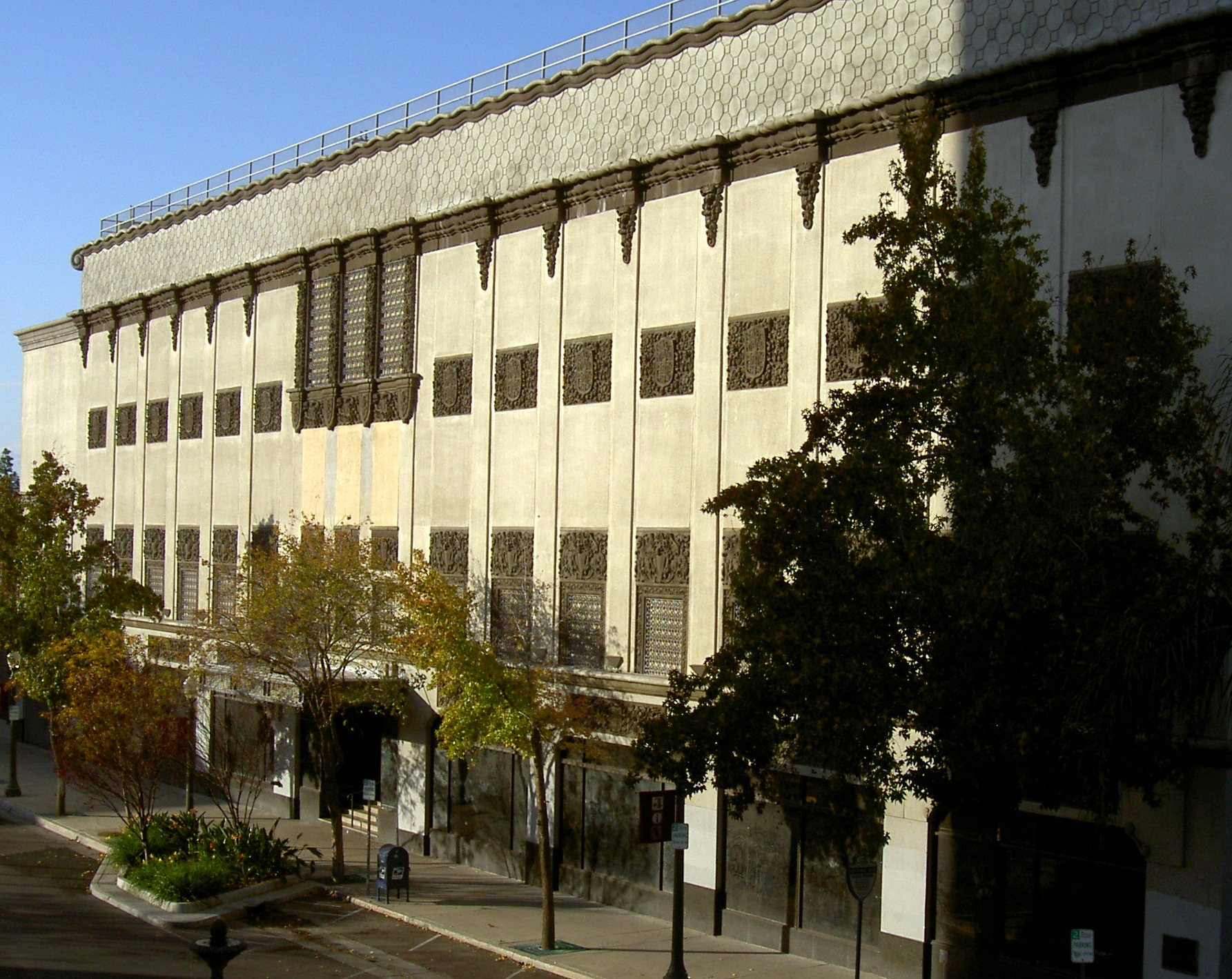
The California Churrigueresque style Harris Company Building

Top employers

Government, retail, and service industries dominate the economy of the city of San Bernardino. From 1998 to 2004, San Bernardino's economy grew by 26,217 jobs, a 37% increase, to 97,139. Government was both the largest and the fastest-growing employment sector, reaching close to 20,000 jobs in 2004. Other significant sectors were retail (16,000 jobs) and education (13,200 jobs).

According to the city's 2020 Comprehensive Annual Financial Report, the top employers in the city are:

Employer	# of employees
Stater Bros.	15,000–25,000
County of San Bernardino	5,000–14,999
San Bernardino City Unified School District	5,000–14,999
Kohl's	5,000–14,999
Barrett Business Services, Inc.	1,000–4,999
San Bernardino Community College District	1,000–4,999
California Department of Transportation	1,000–4,999
Loma Linda University Medical Center	1,000–4,999
City of San Bernardino	1,117
California State University, San Bernardino	1,000–4,999

== Arts and culture ==
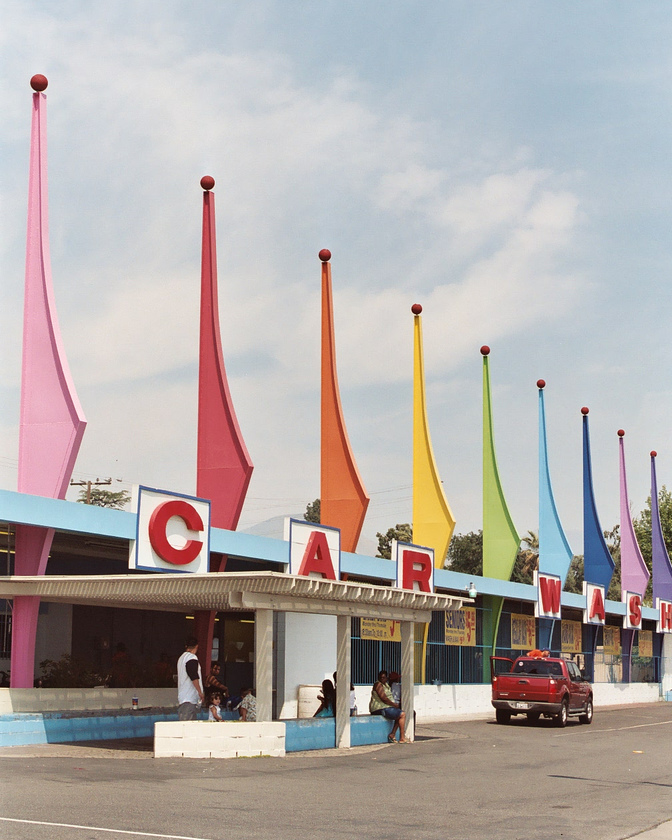
A Googie-style car wash

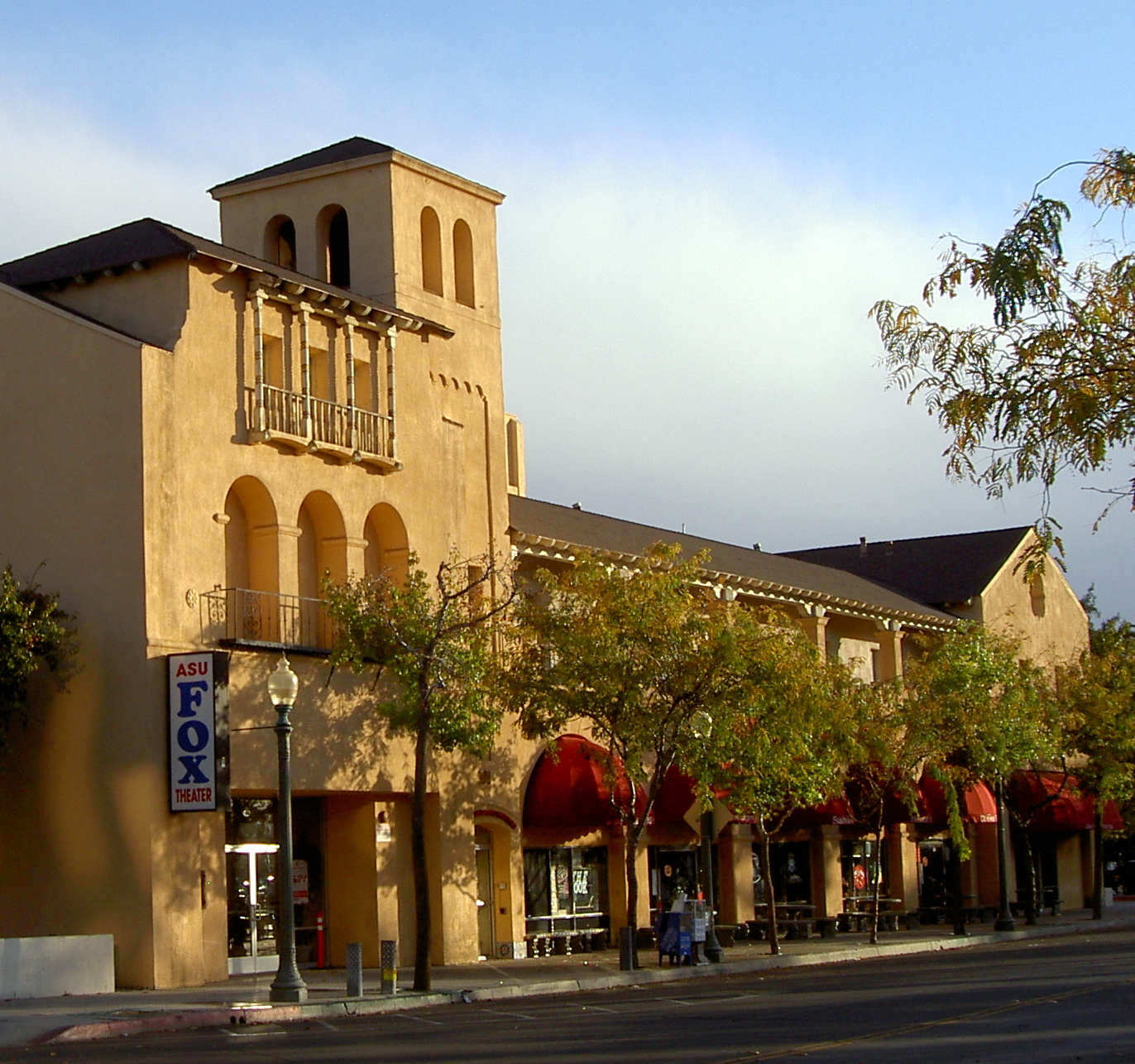
The historic Fox Theatre

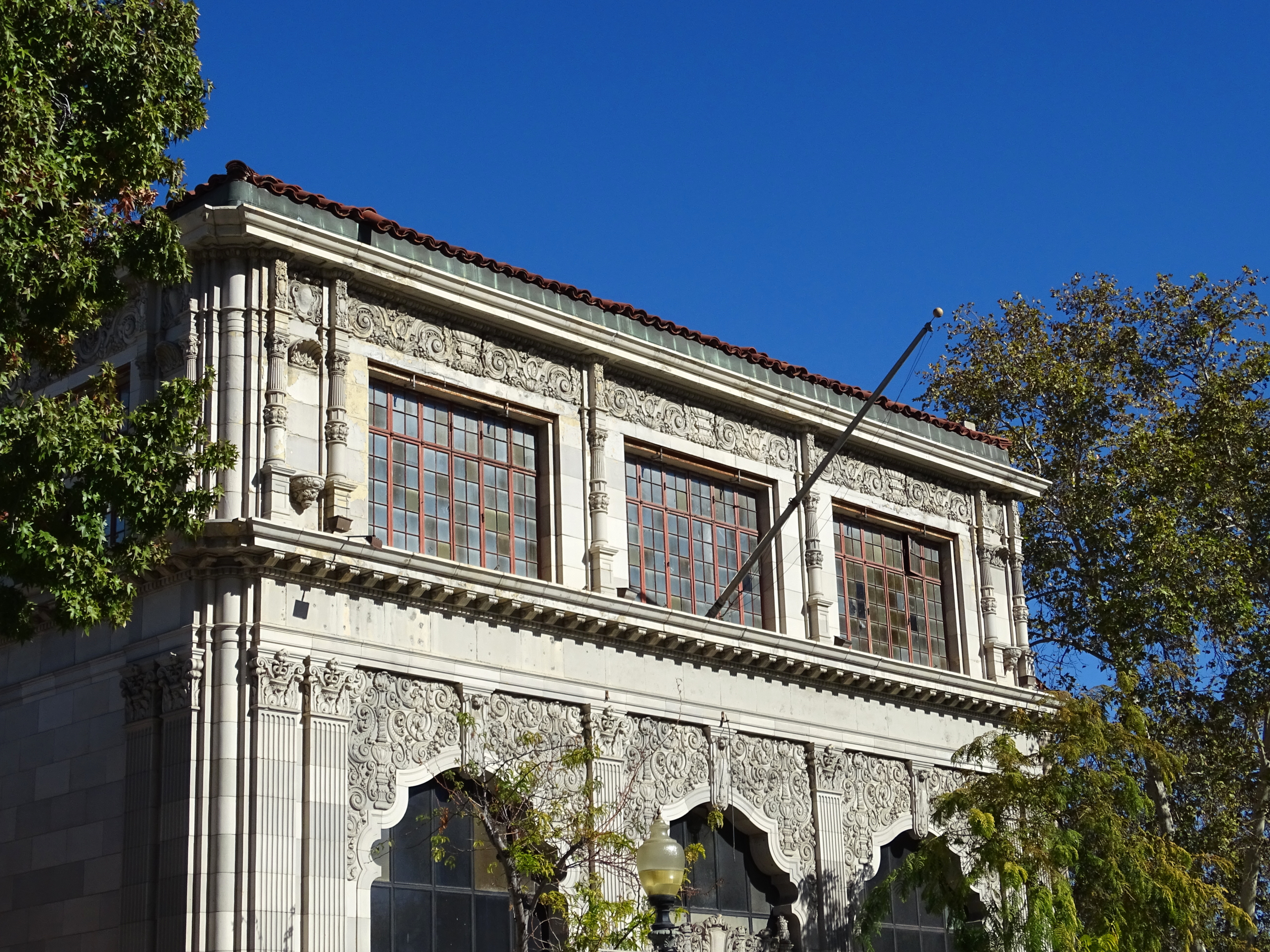
The Spanish Colonial Revival style Heritage Building, designed after the Casa Consistorial in Sevilla, Spain

Berneice's Barber Shop, San Bernardino, photographed by John Margolies in 1977

San Bernardino hosts several major annual events, including: Route 66 Rendezvous, a four-day celebration of America's "Mother Road" that is held in downtown San Bernardino each September; the Berdoo Bikes & Blues Rendezvous, held in the spring; the National Orange Show Festival, a citrus exposition founded in 1911 and also held in the spring; and, the Western Regional Little League Championships held each August, as well as the annual anniversary of the birth of the Mother Charter of the Hells Angels Motorcycle Club, Berdoo California Chapter.

San Bernardino is home to the historic Arrowhead Springs Hotel and Spa, located in the Arrowhead Springs neighborhood, which encompasses 1,916 acres (7.75 km^{2}) directly beneath the Arrowhead geological monument that presides over the San Bernardino Valley. The resort contains hot springs, in addition to mineral baths and steam caves located deep underground. Long the headquarters for Campus Crusade for Christ, the site now remains largely vacant and unused since their operations moved to Florida. The $300 million Yaamava Resort & Casino, one of the few in southern California that does operate as a resort hotel, is located approximately one mile from the Arrowhead Springs Hotel and Spa.

=== Museums ===
The Robert V. Fullerton Museum of Art, located on the campus of California State University, San Bernardino, contains a collection of Egyptian antiquities, ancient pottery from present-day Italy, and funerary art from ancient China. In addition to the extensive antiquities on display, the museum presents contemporary art and changing exhibitions.

The Heritage House holds the collection of the San Bernardino Historic and Pioneer Society. The San Bernardino County Museum of regional history in Redlands has exhibits relating to the city of San Bernardino as well.

The San Bernardino Railroad and History Museum is located inside the historic Santa Fe Depot. A Route 66 museum is located on the historic site of the original McDonald's restaurant.

Specialty museums include the Inland Empire Military Museum, the American Sports Museum, and the adjacent WBC Legends of Boxing Museum.

=== Performing arts ===
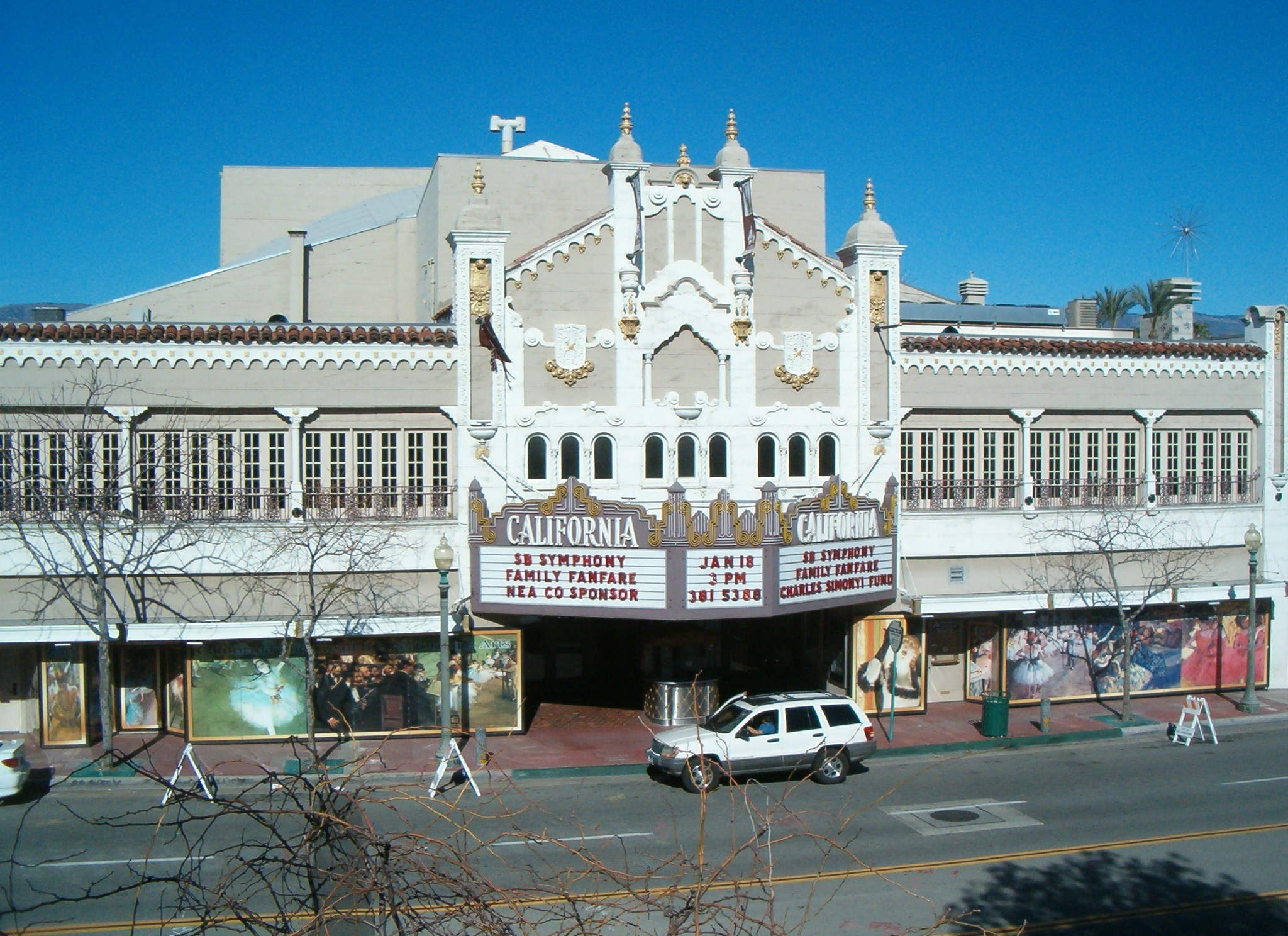
The historic California Theatre

- The 1928 California Theatre (San Bernardino), California Theater of the Performing Arts in downtown San Bernardino hosts an array of events, including concerts by the San Bernardino Symphony Orchestra, as well as touring Broadway theater productions presented by Theatrical Arts International, the Inland Empire's largest theater company.
- San Manuel Amphitheater, originally Glen Helen Pavilion at the Cajon Pass is the largest amphitheater in the United States.
- National Orange Show Festival The National Orange Show Events Center contains: the Orange Pavilion; a stadium; two large clear-span exhibition halls; a clear-span geodesic dome; and several ballrooms.
- Coussoulis Arena in the University District is the largest venue of its type in San Bernardino and Riverside Counties.
- Sturges Center for the Fine Arts, including the 800-seat Sturges Auditorium, hosts lectures, concerts, and other theater.
- Children's theater company Junior University presents musical performances at the San Manuel Performing Arts Center at Aquinas High School during the summer and in December.
- The historic 1929 Fox Theater of San Bernardino, located downtown and owned by American Sports University, has recently been restored for new use.
- The Lyric Symphony Orchestra in nearby Loma Linda, California presents concerts in the city and nearby communities.

== Sports ==
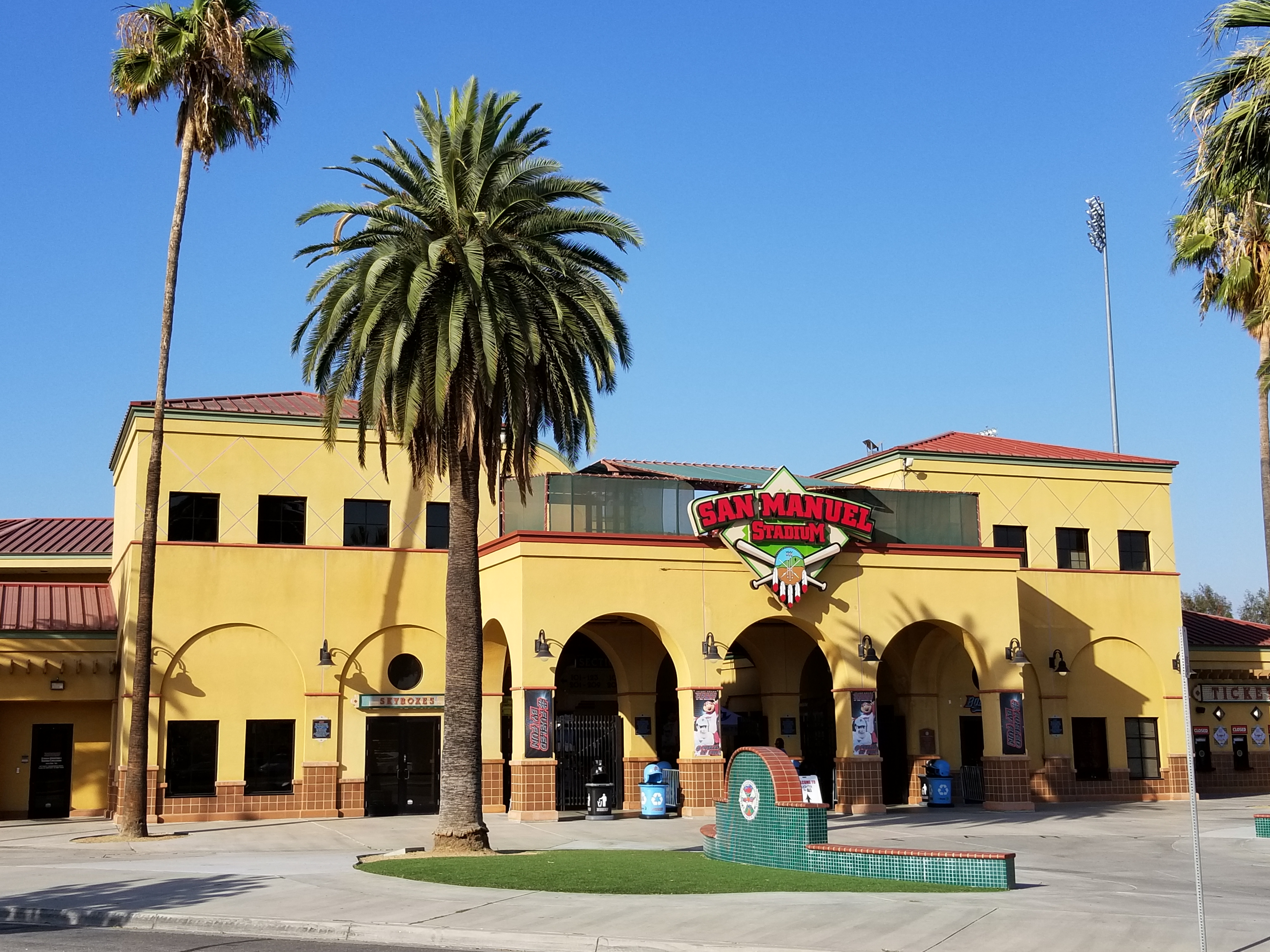
San Manuel Stadium, home of the Inland Empire 66ers

The California State University, San Bernardino (CSUSB) Coyotes compete at the NCAA Division II level in a variety of sports. San Bernardino Valley College competes in the CCCAA and is the only school to offer football at the collegiate level in San Bernardino.

CSUSB used to play their home baseball games at the downtown venue, Arrowhead Credit Union Park, but now play all their home games at the uptown venue, Fiscalini Field.

San Bernardino has had other professional and semi-pro teams over the years, including the San Bernardino Jazz professional women's volleyball team, the San Bernardino Pride Senior Baseball team, and the San Bernardino Spirit California League Single A baseball team.

The Glen Helen Raceway has hosted off-road motorsport races such as rounds of the AMA Motocross Championship, Motocross World Championship and Lucas Oil Off Road Racing Series.

San Bernardino also hosts the BSR West Super Late Model Series at Orange Show Speedway. The series fields many drivers, including NASCAR Truck Series regular Ron Hornaday Jr., who drove the No. 33 in a race on July 12, 2008.

The city hosts the Inland Empire 66ers baseball club of the California League, which since 2011 has been the Los Angeles Angels Single A affiliate. The team was the Los Angeles Dodgers Single A affiliate from 2007 to 2010. The 66ers play at San Manuel Stadium in downtown San Bernardino.

== Parks and recreation ==
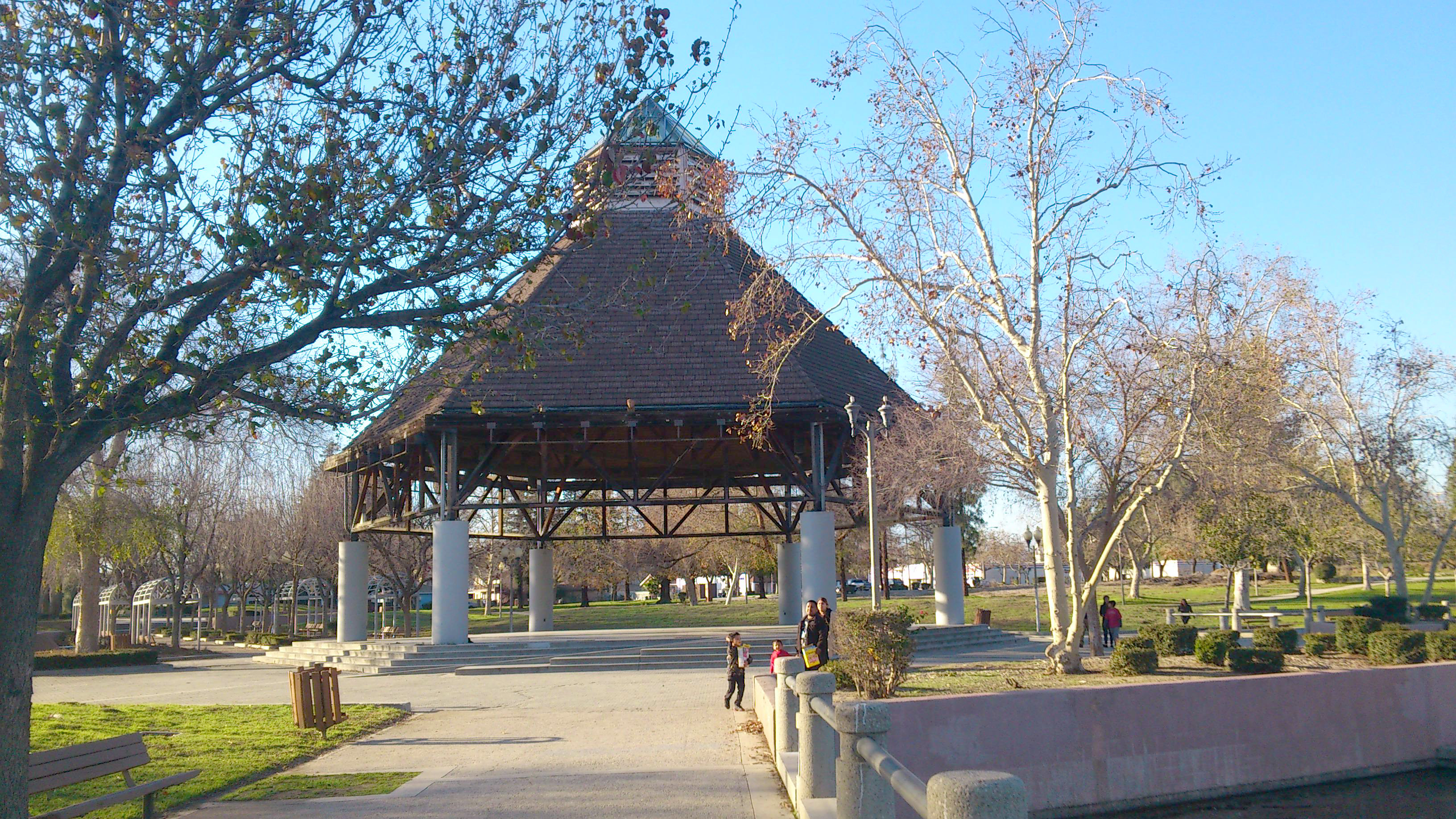
Seccombe Lake Park

San Bernardino offers several parks and other recreation facilities. Perris Hill Park is the largest with Roosevelt Bowl, Fiscalini Field, several tennis courts, a Y.M.C.A., a senior center, a shooting range, hiking trails, and a pool.

Other notable parks include: the Glen Helen Regional Park, operated by the County of San Bernardino, is located in the northernmost part of the city.

Blair Park is another midsized park near the University District, it is home to a well known skate park and various hiking trails on Shandin Hills, also known as Little Mountain.

In 2017, San Bernardino park opened its newest park, named in honor of local heroes Bryce Hanes and Jon Cole.

== Government ==
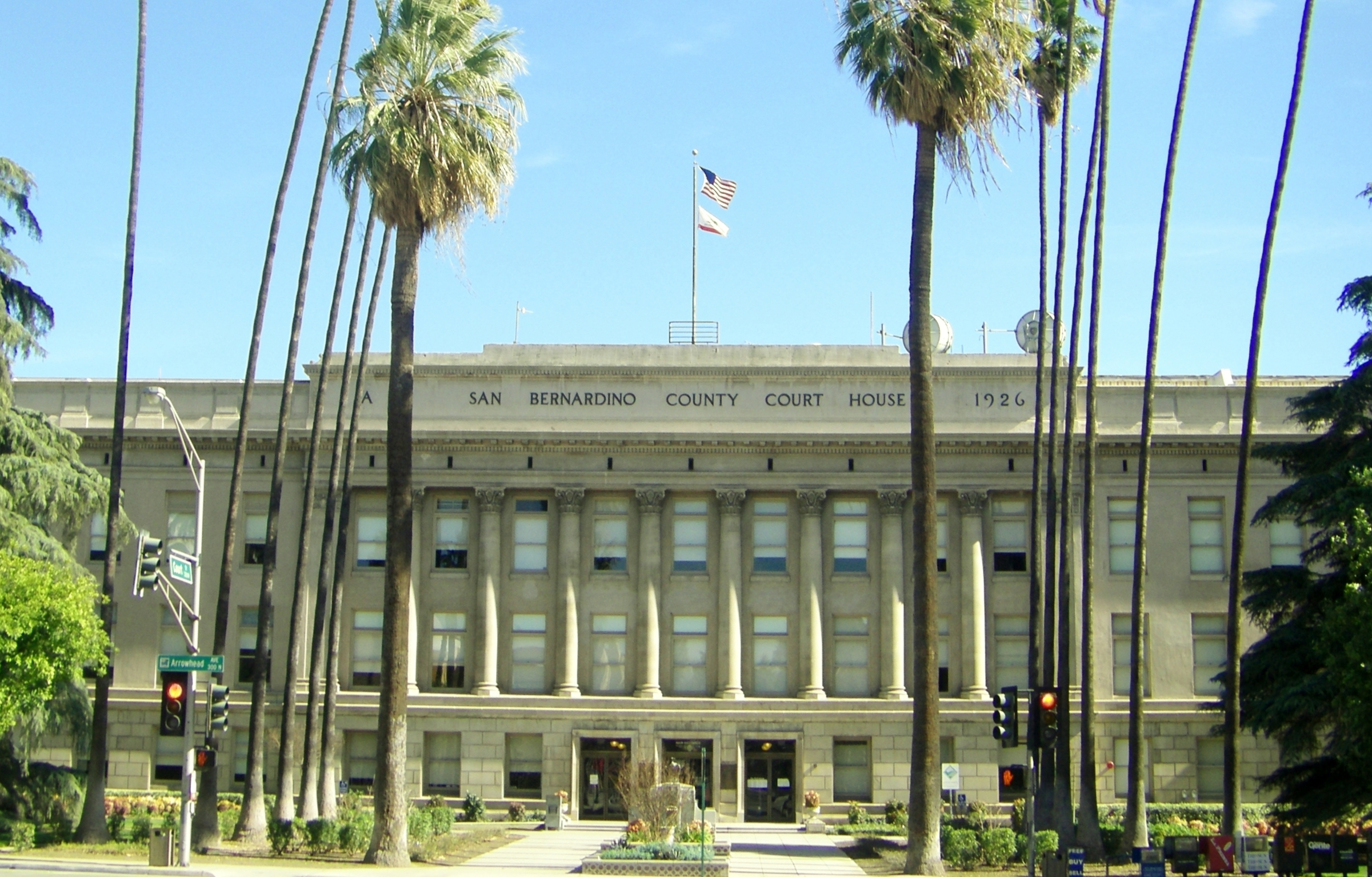
The historic San Bernardino County Court House, built in 1927

The city of San Bernardino is a charter city; the first charter was passed in 1905, while the most recent charter was passed in 2016. The 2016 charter revision made the mayor position largely ceremonial without voting powers, thus the mayor now has to work with a seven-member city council that sets directions of the city and a chief executive who see the day-to-day running of the city. San Bernardino is the county seat of San Bernardino County, the largest organized county in the contiguous United States by area.

The current Mayor of San Bernardino is Helen Tran. The current city council is made up of Theodore Sánchez, Sandra Ibarra, Juan Figueroa, Fred Shorett, Kimberly Knaus, Mario Flores and Treasure Ortiz . Bob Holcomb (1922–2010) was the longest-serving mayor of San Bernardino to date, holding the office from 1971 until 1985 and again from 1989 to 1993.

In the California State Senate, San Bernardino is split between the 20th senatorial district, represented by Democrat Caroline Menjivar, and the 23rd senatorial district, represented by Republican Suzette Martinez Valladares. In the California State Assembly, it is split between the 40th Assembly district, represented by Democrat Pilar Schiavo, and the 47th Assembly district, represented by Republican Greg Wallis.

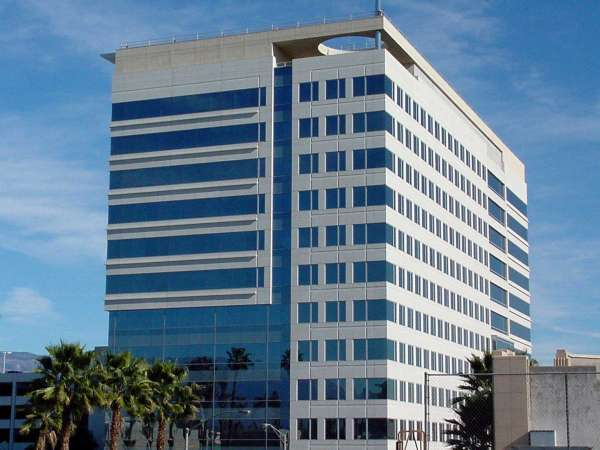
The Rosa Parks Memorial Building hosts government departments of San Bernardino County.

In the United States House of Representatives, San Bernardino is in California's 33rd congressional district, which has a Cook PVI of D+12 and is represented by Democrat Pete Aguilar.

Public safety

San Bernardino has long battled high crime rates. According to statistics published by Morgan Quitno, San Bernardino was the 16th most dangerous US city in 2003, 18th in 2004 and 24th in 2005. San Bernardino's murder rate was 29 per 100,000 in 2005, the 13th-highest murder rate in the country and the third highest in the state of California after Compton and Richmond. Police efforts have significantly reduced crime in 2008 and a major drop collectively since 1993 when the city's murder rate placed ninth in the nation. Thirty two killings occurred in 2009, a number identical to 2008 and the lowest murder rate in San Bernardino since 2002, but only a third of cases led to arrests. According to findings by the U.S. Census Bureau, San Bernardino was among the most poverty-stricken cities in the nation, second nationally behind Detroit.

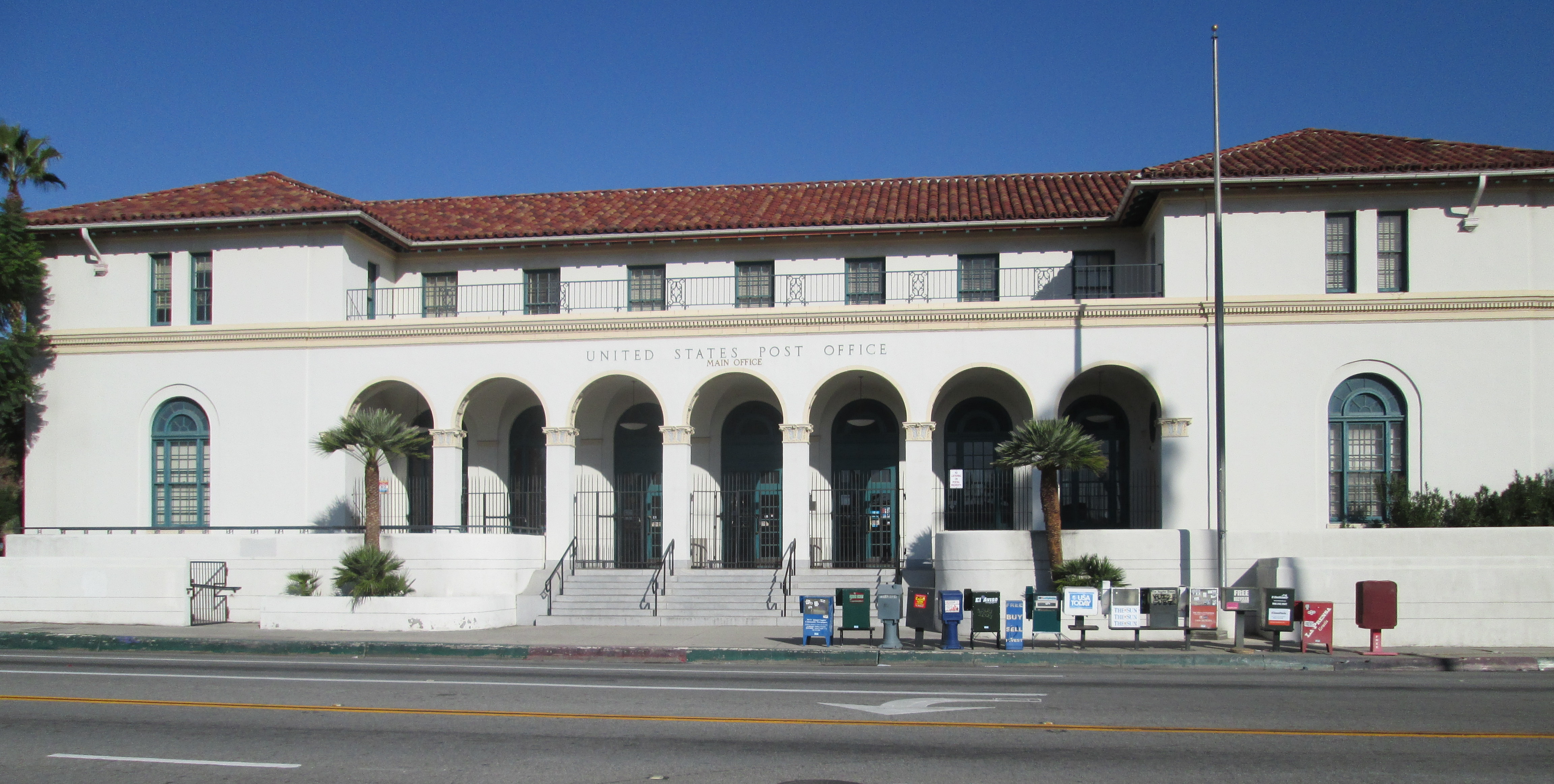
San Bernardino Downtown Station

Bankruptcy

On July 10, 2012, the City Council of San Bernardino decided to seek protection under Chapter 9, Title 11, United States Code, making it the third California municipality to do so in less than two weeks (after Stockton and the town of Mammoth Lakes), and the second-largest ever. According to state law, the city would normally have to negotiate with creditors first, but, because they declared a fiscal emergency in June, that requirement did not apply. The case was filed on August 1.

=== Foreign consulates ===
The governments of Guatemala, Mexico, and El Salvador have established consulates in the downtown area of the city.

== Education ==
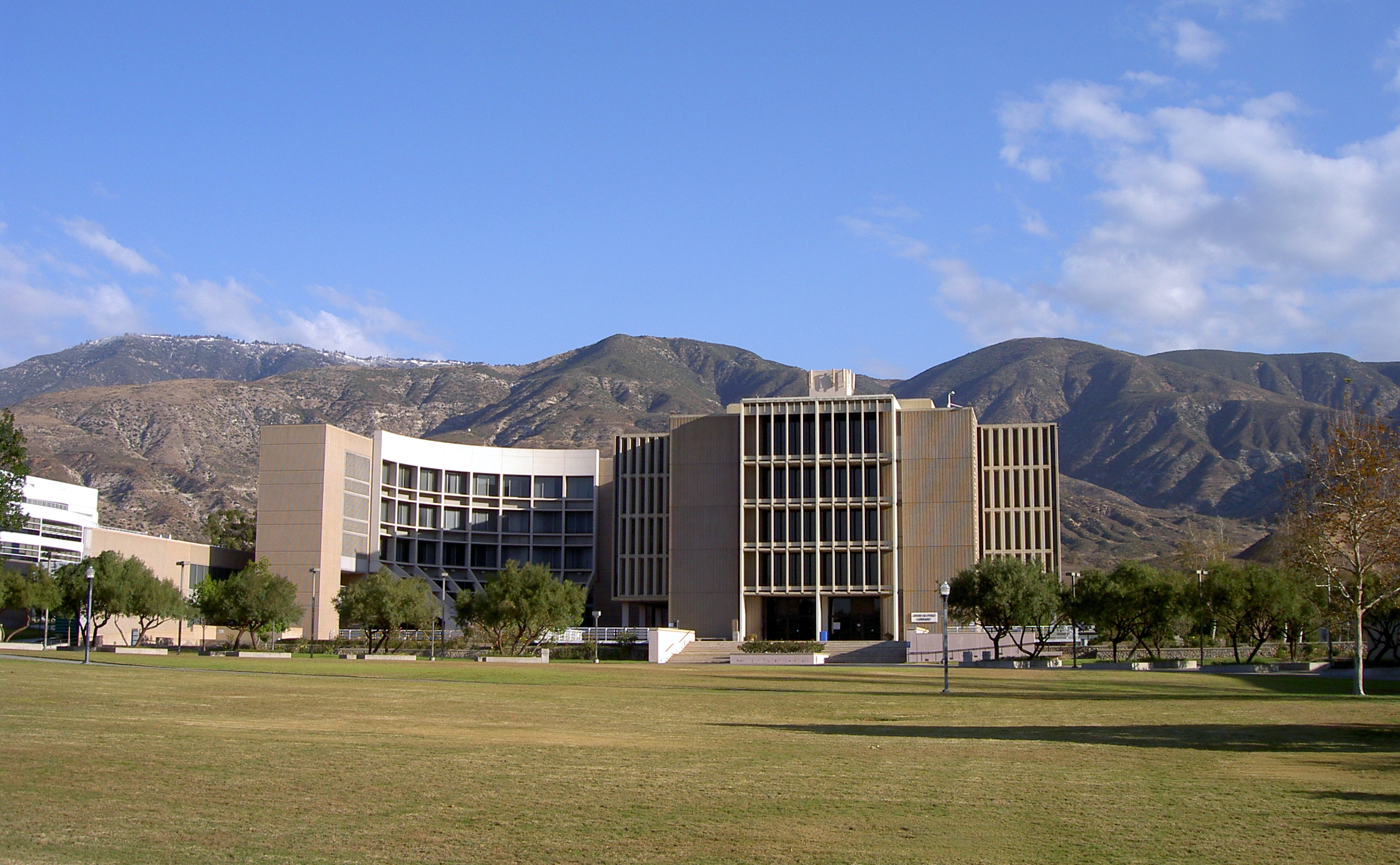
Pfau Library as seen from University Parkway

Most of San Bernardino is within the San Bernardino City Unified School District, the eighth largest district in the state, although it is also served by Colton, Redlands (far south east) and Rialto (far west) Unified School Districts.

Local public high schools include Aquinas High School, Arroyo Valley High School, Cajon High School, San Bernardino High School, Pacific, San Gorgonio High School, and Indian Springs High School. RUSD's Rialto High School is in San Bernardino. Despite (Note: The City of Houston, Texas, explains the discrepancy: "The U.S. Postal Service establishes ZIP codes and mailing addresses in order to maximize the efficiency of their system, not to recognize jurisdictional boundaries.") the Rialto address, the school is in the San Bernardino city limits, not the Rialto city limits.

=== Colleges and universities ===
San Bernardino is notably home to California State University, San Bernardino (CSUSB), a campus of the CSU System. Founded in 1965, CSUSB is located in the University District of San Bernardino.

Other higher education in the area includes:

- California University of Science and Medicine
- San Bernardino Valley College
- The Art Institute of California – Inland Empire
- American Sports University
- Inland Empire Job Corps Center
- UEI College
- Summit Career College

== Media ==
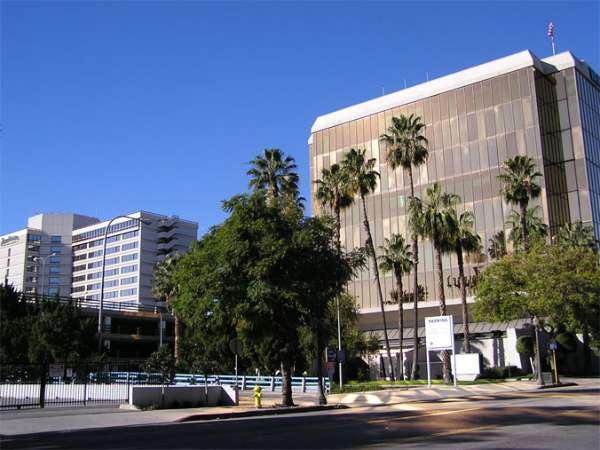
Downtown San Bernardino

San Bernardino is part of the Los Angeles Nielsen area. As such, most its residents receive the same local television and radio stations as residents of Los Angeles. KVCR-DT, a PBS member station operated by the San Bernardino Community College District, is the only local San Bernardino television station. KPXN, an Ion Television network owned-and-operated station for Los Angeles, is licensed to San Bernardino, but the station maintains no physical presence there. Most of the northern section of San Bernardino cannot receive over-the-air television broadcasts from Los Angeles because Mount Baldy, and other San Gabriel Mountain peaks, block transmissions from Mount Wilson.

Historically, San Bernardino has had a number of newspapers. Today, the San Bernardino Sun, founded in 1894 (but was the continuation of an earlier paper) publishes in North San Bernardino, and has a circulation area roughly from Yucaipa to Fontana, including the mountain communities. The Precinct Reporter has been publishing weekly since 1965, primarily serving African American residents. Its circulation also includes Riverside County and Pomona Valley. There is also the Black Voice News that previously served Riverside has been in the area over 30 years and has more recently served African Americans that live in the community. Another local newspaper centered mostly around the African American community is the Westside Story Newspaper, established in 1987. Their coverage area extends to the greater area of San Bernardino County. They currently operate locally and online. The Inland Catholic Byte is the newspaper of the Roman Catholic Diocese of San Bernardino. The Los Angeles Times is also widely circulated. Another local newspaper serving the Mexican-American/Chicano/Californio community is El Chicano.

== Transportation ==
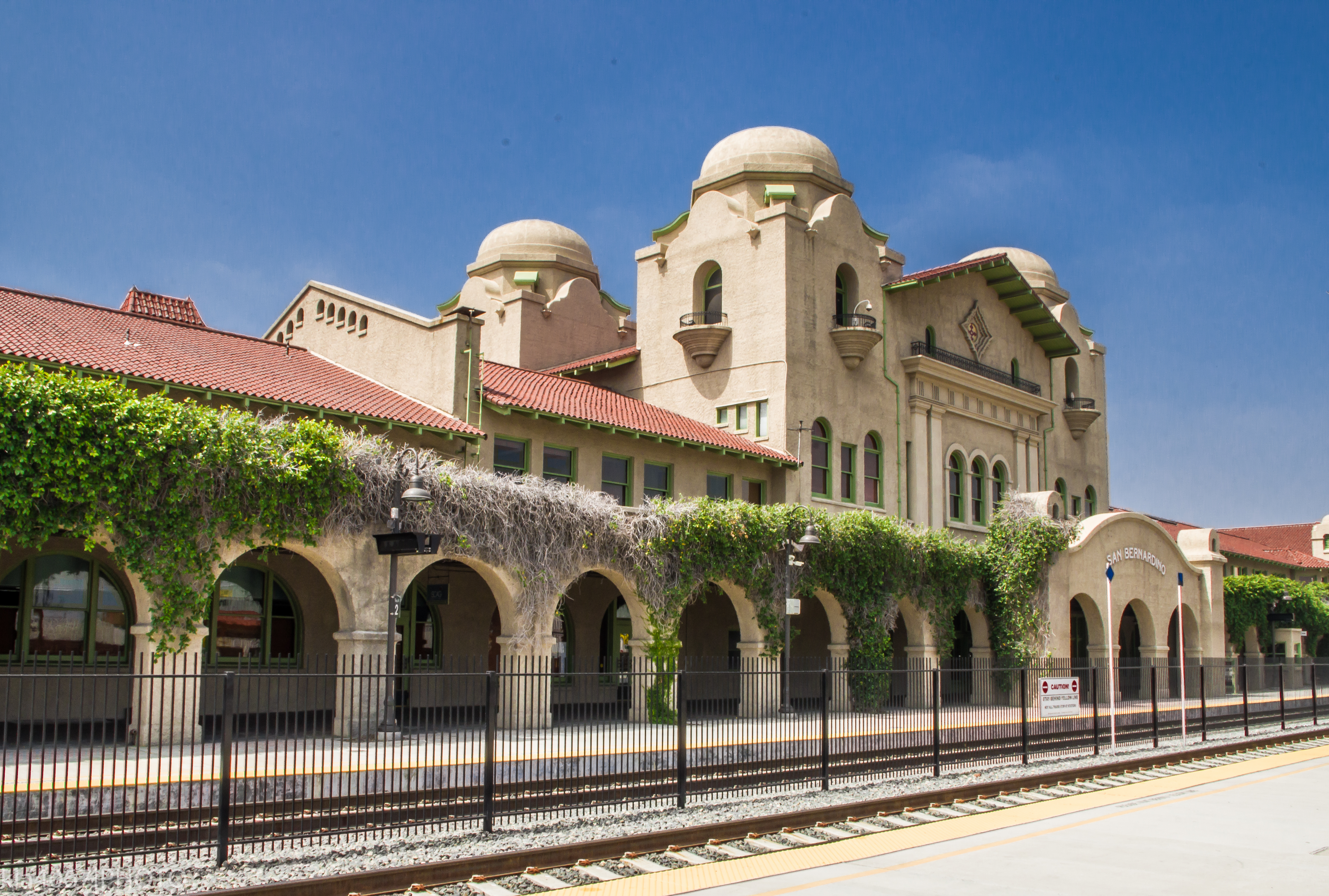
San Bernardino Santa Fe Depot

The city of San Bernardino is a member of the joint-powers authority of Omnitrans and MARTA. A bus rapid transit corridor, called the sbX Green Line, connects the north part of the city near California State University, San Bernardino and the Verdemont Hills area with the Jerry L. Pettis VA Medical Center in Loma Linda, CA. Additional bus routes and on-demand shuttle service for the disabled and elderly is also provided by Omnitrans. MARTA provides a connection between downtown and the mountain communities.

Major local thoroughfares include San Bernardino Freeway, Barstow Freeway, Foothill Freeway, and Waterman Avenue.

=== Rail ===
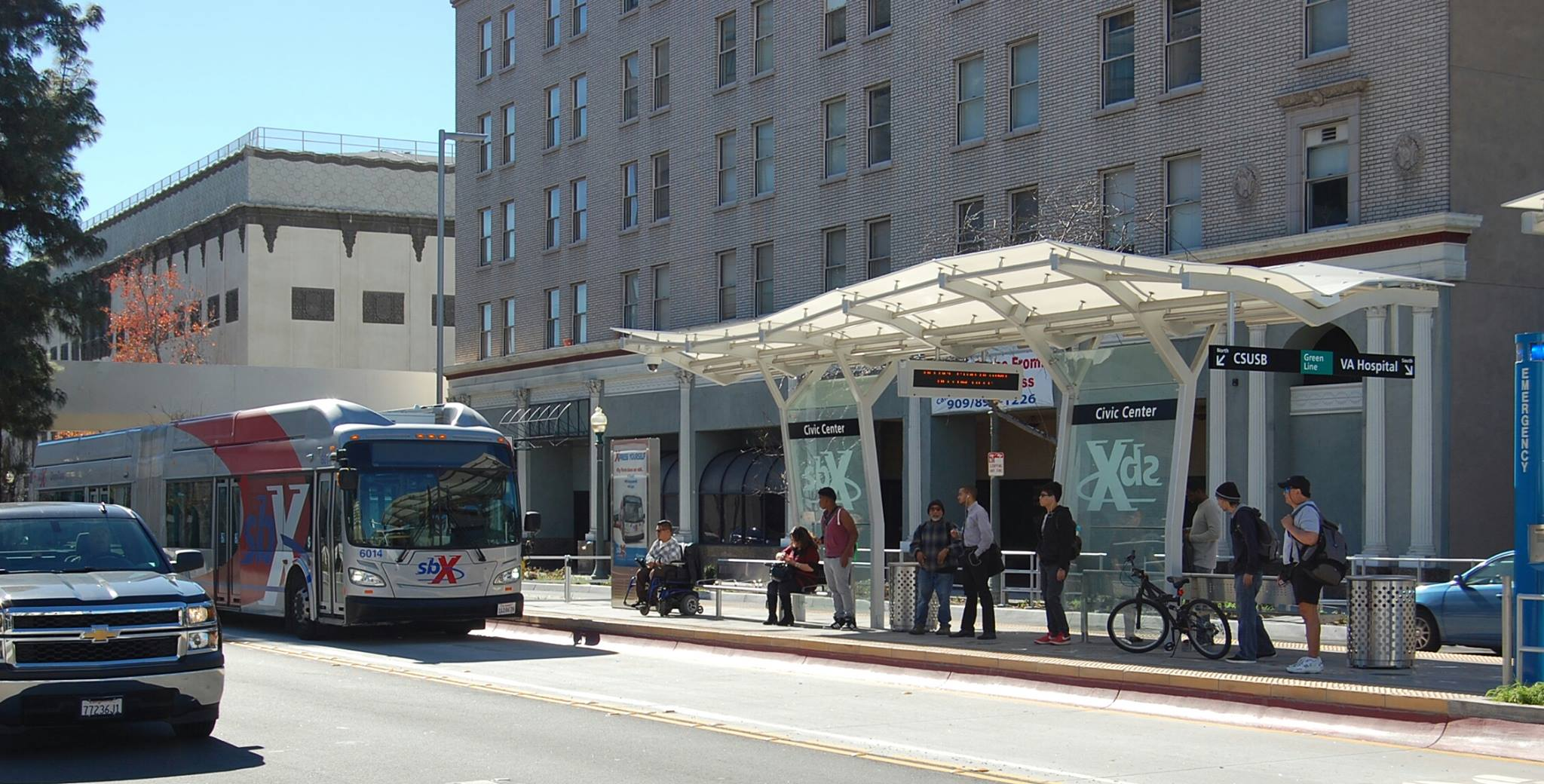
The sbX Civic Center station in Downtown San Bernardino

Amtrak's Southwest Chief, operating between Los Angeles and Chicago, has one daily train in each direction that stops at the San Bernardino station.

San Bernardino is served by the Metrolink regional rail service. Two lines serve the city: the Inland Empire–Orange County Line and the San Bernardino Line. The San Bernardino Transit Center in the downtown area is where passengers can connect with the sbX Green Line BRT, and regular bus service from MARTA, Omnitrans, and VVTA.

Arrow is a passenger rail link to neighboring Redlands that opened in 2022. Trains begin at the San Bernardino Transit Center and make an additional stop at Tippecanoe Avenue before continuing into Redlands.

From 1941 to 1947, the city was served by the Pacific Electric Upland–San Bernardino Line.

=== Airports ===
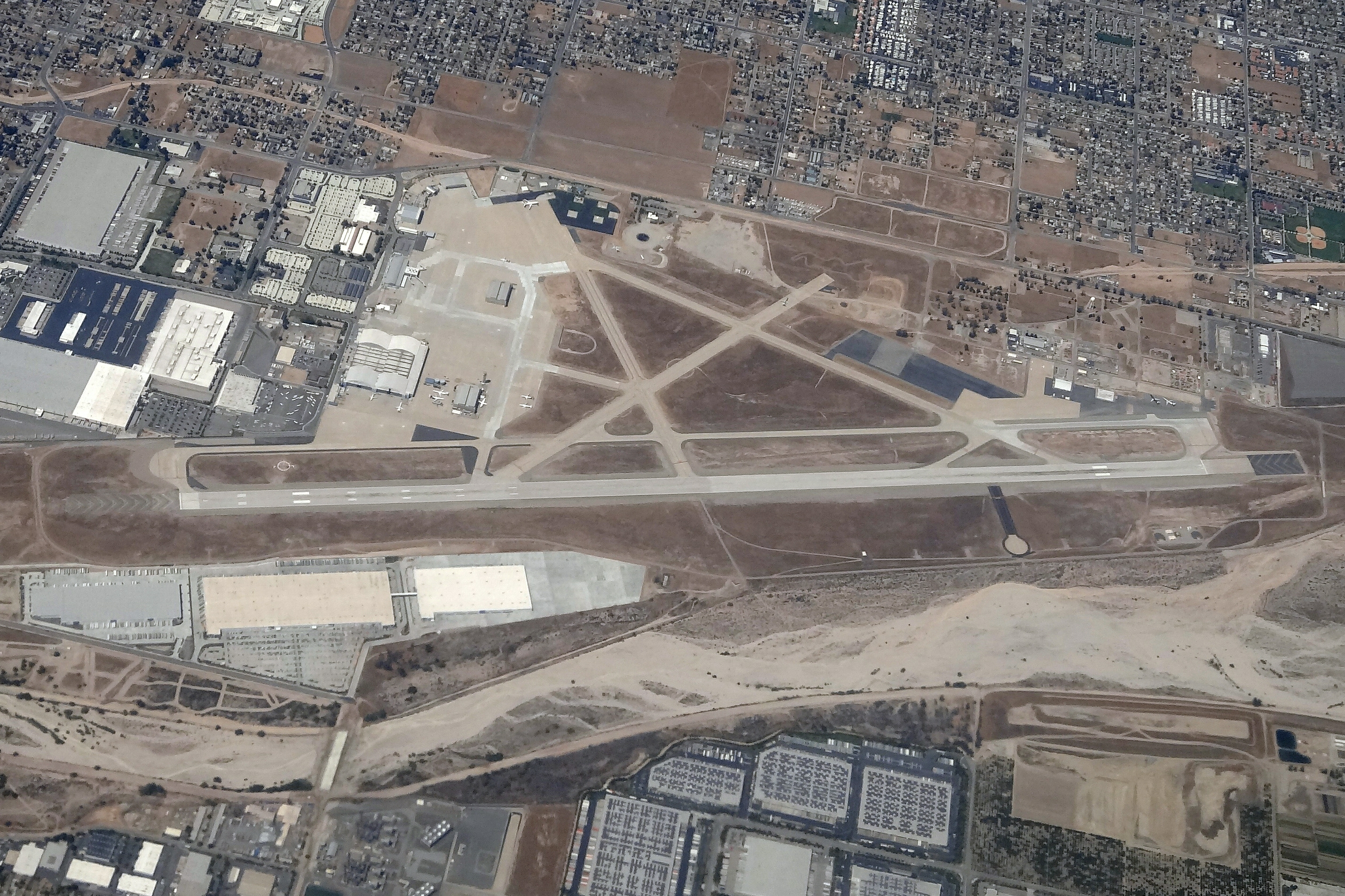
San Bernardino International Airport

San Bernardino International Airport is physically located within the city and provides commercial passenger air service. The airport is the former site of Norton Air Force Base which operated from 1942 – 1994. In 1989, Norton was placed on the Department of Defense closure list and the majority of the closure occurred in 1994, with the last offices finally leaving in 1995. Several warehouses have been, and continue to be, built in the vicinity.

The facility, itself, is within the jurisdiction of the Inland Valley Development Agency, a joint powers authority, and the San Bernardino Airport Authority. Hillwood, a venture run by H. Ross Perot Jr., is the master developer of the project, which it calls AllianceCalifornia. The airport currently offers commercial passenger service out of its both the domestic and international terminals.

== Sister cities ==
San Bernardino's sister cities are:

- Villahermosa, Mexico
- Goyang, South Korea
- Herzliya, Israel
- Ifẹ, Nigeria
- Kigali, Rwanda
- Mexicali, Mexico
- Roxas City, Philippines
- Tachikawa, Japan
- Tauranga, New Zealand
- Yushu, China
- Zavolzhye, Russia

== See also ==
- List of largest California cities by population
