= American Sports University =

University in San Bernardino, California

Coordinates: 34.1063°N 117.2918°W

- Type: Private
- Established: 2006
- Founders: Harry Hwang
- Endowment: N/A
- President: Vacated
- Academic staff: 20
- Administrative staff: 10
- Students: Last Enrolled: 50
- Location: San Bernardino, California, United States
- Campus: Urban
- Mascot: Eagles
- Website: americansportsuniversity.com

American Sports University was a private sports business university in San Bernardino, California. It remained unaccredited since its inception in 2006 until the Department of Consumer Affairs denied renewal of its license in 2016.

== Location ==
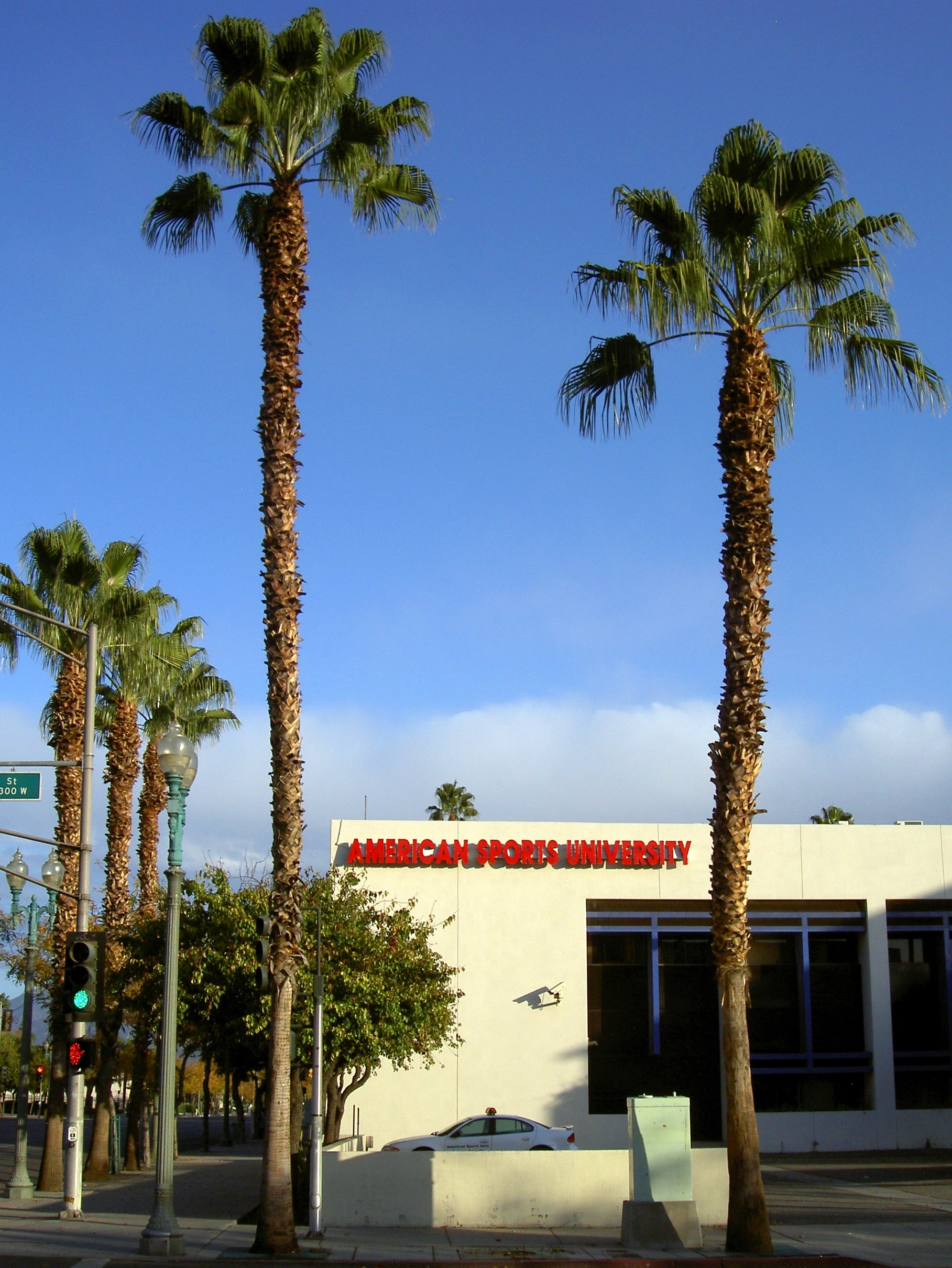
American Sports University

The American Sports University's building was located in Downtown San Bernardino.

== History ==
ASU opened in the fall of 2006. Dr. Donald Singer was the initial president of the university, and Dr. Harry Hwang was the founder and chairman of the board. The board of directors had five members including Hwang's wife and daughter.

Several buildings that composed the former ASU campus were previously owned by the San Bernardino Sun. The campus spanned two blocks and included instructional classrooms, a dormitory, the ASU gym (formerly the San Bernardino Sun printer press), and the future nursing school building (formerly the San Bernardino Public Defender's Office).

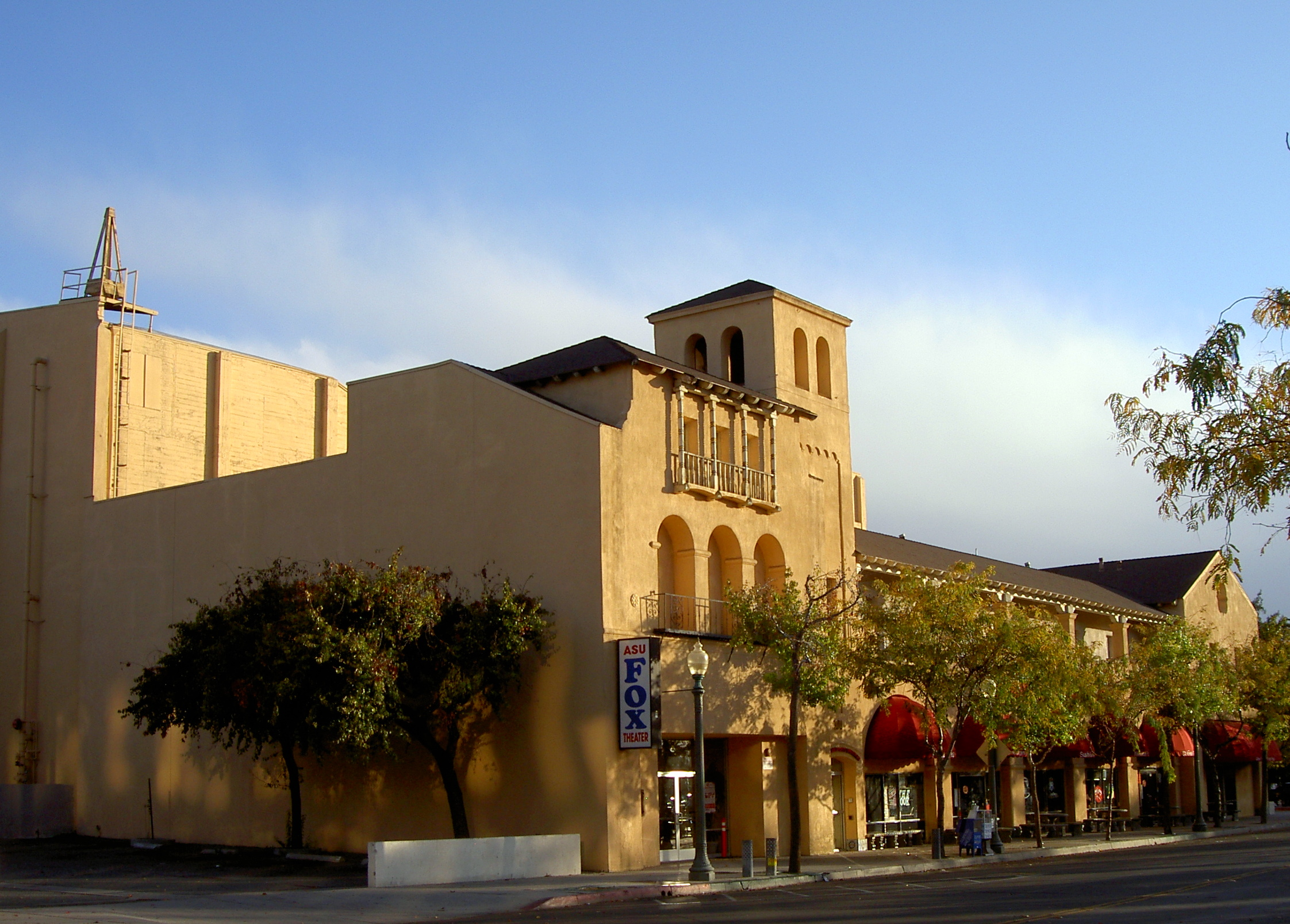
Fox Theatre

The historic Fox Theatre of San Bernardino was also a part of ASU's campus. All original seating that was once part of this building has been removed to accommodate weekly raves the school had typically hosted. Despite closure, the building is still being used for events.

In an early effort to expand the university, Hwang had filed applications to turn part of downtown Fourth St. into a campus walkway and start up a sports-oriented charter high school in the city which never materialized.

== American Sports University Gym ==
The gym, which had been part of the university campus, is still in operation and currently hosts boxing classes.

== Academics ==
American Sports University offered several sports-related programs.

Programs include:

- Graduate Degree Programs
  - Master of Science in Sports Education
- Undergraduate Degree Programs
  - Bachelor of Science in Sports Education
  - Bachelor of Science in Golf Management
  - Bachelor of Science in Sports Management
  - Bachelor of Science in Sports Coaching
  - Bachelor of Science in Sports Health
  - Bachelor of Science in Sports Training and Fitness
  - Bachelor of Science in Sports Recreation Management
  - Bachelor of Science in Sports Marketing

== Athletics ==
Non-Traditional Athletics Available

- Tae Kwon Do

== WBC Legends of Boxing Museum ==
Despite the school's closure, The Administration Building continued to host the WBC Legends of Boxing Museum, until the museum's relocation to Los Angeles. The WBC Legends of Boxing Museum is the only museum sanctioned and dedicated to fighters of the WBC. The first members to be honored and enshrined at the museum was the WBC Hall of Fame Class of 2008. Class of 2008 Inductees were Ken Norton, Danny Lopez, Armando Ramos, Lennox Lewis, Genaro Hernandez, Gabriel Ruelas, Diego Corrales, Roger Mayweather, Paul Banke, Bobby Chacon, Armando Muniz, Rene Arredondo, and Alberto Davila.

The museum contains memorabilia from past WBC champions that is showcased on standing glass cases, wall cases and more. Some of the WBC legends whose memorabilia are on display include Muhammad Ali, Mike Tyson, Julio César Chávez, Lennox Lewis, Marco Antonio Barrera, Ken Norton, Diego Corrales, Erik Morales, Danny Lopez, Roger Mayweather, Rene Arredondo, Bobby Chacon, Salvador Sánchez, and Laila Ali.

== Notable alumni ==
- Nia Abdallah, 2004 Olympic silver medalist (Taekwondo)
- R. Jay Soward, former NFL wide receiver for the Jacksonville Jaguars (did not graduate)

== Former Campus ==
American Sports University is defunct, and the building was used for low-income housing. The property though, was neither zoned for residential use nor maintained by the owner of record. Up to a possible one hundred tenants were notified September 28, 2022 they must vacate.
