= WBC Legends of Boxing Museum =

Coordinates: 34.1063°N 117.2918°W

The WBC Legends of Boxing Museum, located in Los Angeles (formerly at the defunct American Sports University in San Bernardino, California), is a museum that pays honor to the achievements and accomplishments of some of the most famous boxers of all time, more specifically past World Boxing Council champions. The WBC is one of the four (WBA, WBC, WBO, IBF) major sanctioning bodies in boxing. The museum's motto is, "Great fighters may retire, but their greatness lives on forever." This quote was created by Board Member Eric Casillas.

== Purpose ==
The museum enables boxing fans as well as the general public to come view items and artifacts which are displayed for inspiration, learning, and enjoyment for the continued legacy of boxing.

== History ==
The World Boxing Council has been in existence since the early 1960s and has crowned some of the most legendary boxers to ever lace them up, yet, prior to the opening of the museum, there was no place that housed the treasures and history of past WBC Champions. In June 2008 that all changed. Former WBC President Dr. Jose Sulaiman, founder and chairman of American Sports University Dr. Harry Hwang, WBC Supervisor Dr. Rudy Tellez, WBC LBM Co-Chairman Jaime Ochoa and Vincent Johnson and Directors Angel Ochoa and Eric Casillas are the founding fathers of this museum and spearheaded its creation. A Grand Opening was held on June 27, 2008, and an estimated 700 people including fans, civic leaders, press, and legendary fighters attended this event.

== WBC Hall of Fame ==
The WBC has a long-standing history of champions. The WBC Hall of Fame includes fighters like Bob Foster, Mike Tyson, Muhammad Ali, Sugar Ray Leonard, Jose Napoles, Nino Benvenuti, Ken Norton, Salvador Sanchez, Ruben Olivares, Lupe Pintor, Marvin Hagler, Joe Frazier, Wilfred Benítez, Wilfredo Gómez and more.

== Board of directors ==
The WBC Legends of Boxing Museum is run by a Board of Directors who fulfill duties ranging from the induction of fighters, design of the museum, setting and preparing events, contacting press and media, review and consideration of prized artifacts, hosting induction ceremonies, etc. The Board of Directors currently has 15 members.

== Inductees ==
Those that are honored and inducted into the WBC Legends of Boxing Museum are screened by the Board of Directors that rigorously review the achievements and accomplishments of the boxer nominated. The nominee will gain induction upon majority vote. If the boxer does not receive a majority vote decision by the board members, the individual may be nominated in the future for reconsideration of his induction into the WBC Legends of Boxing Museum. Typically, the boxer needs to be five years retired from the sport to be eligible for induction and must have displayed outstanding achievements and accomplishments in their boxing career.

== Inaugural Members of the WBC Legends of Boxing Museum ==
The first members honored and enshrined at the museum was the WBC Hall of Fame Class of 2008. Class of 2008 Inductees were Ken Norton, Danny "Lil Red" Lopez, Armando Ramos, Erubey "Chango" Carmona, Lennox Lewis, Genaro "Chicanito" Hernandez, Gabriel Ruelas, Diego "Chico" Corrales, Roger Mayweather, Rodolfo "El Gato" González, Paul Banke, Bobby Chacon, Armando Muniz, Rene Arredondo, and Alberto Davila.

== Lifetime Achievement Awards ==
The museum also presents a lifetime achievement award. The WBC Legends of Boxing Award for Lifetime Achievement was established and sanctioned first in 2008 by Chairman Dr. Rudolph J. Tellez to honor an individual who has made significant fundamental contributions to the world of pugilism, either through a single branch of the sport or through a body of work combining different elements of boxing. These contributions, whether they have been in boxing competition, promotion, training, announcing, sports journalism, photography, leadership or mentorship, must have had a lasting impact on the boxing world and must have demonstrated a lifetime commitment to progress and promotion of the Sweet Science. The 1st Annual Lifetime Achievement Awards were presented at the 2008 WBC Legends of Boxing Museum Inaugural Induction Ceremony at the American Sports University in San Bernardino, Ca, U.S.A. on 27 June 2008. Twelve awards were given on that day and were presented to notable boxing figures such as Cleto Reyes, founder of the glove manufacturing company Industria Reyes, legendary world champion trainer Floyd Mayweather Sr., world champion trainer and manager Bennie Georgino, Ken Thompson, owner of Thompson's Boxing Promotions and former World Boxing Hall of Fame President Adolfo Perez, among others.

== How Memorabilia is Placed into the Museum ==
Items are placed into the museum by a variety of ways. Prized personal possessions are given to the museum for enshrinement by the inducted fighter. Items can be placed into the museum by the WBC Legends of Boxing Museum Board of Directors that are deemed of significant WBC boxing value. Items can be given to the museum by family members or the managing team of a deceased past WBC champion that is receiving an award or induction. Some of the memorabilia in the museum includes; autographed gloves, autographed pictures, WBC championship belts, posters, trophies from inductees, etc.

== Memorabilia from Fighters that are on Display ==
The museum is filled with memorabilia from past WBC champions that is showcased on standing glass cases, wall cases and more. Some of the WBC legends whose memorabilia are on display include Muhammad Ali, Mike Tyson, Julio Cesar Chavez, Lennox Lewis, Marco Antonio Barrera, Ken Norton, Diego Corrales, Erik Morales, Danny "Little Red" Lopez, Roger Mayweather, Rene Arredondo, Bobby Chacon, Salvador Sanchez, and Laila Ali among many more WBC boxing greats.

== Visiting ==
The museum is open to the public and is free of charge. The museum welcomes all people to come view the treasures and history of the greatest WBC Champions. Special visits are available upon request and include private showings and tours for schools, boxing clubs, boxing organizations, community leaders, boxing fans, etc...

== Quick Notes ==
- The WBC Legends of Boxing Museum is the only boxing museum on the west coast.
- The WBC also has a museum that honors WBC champions in Mexico City, Mexico.
