= 2026 San Bernardino mayoral election =

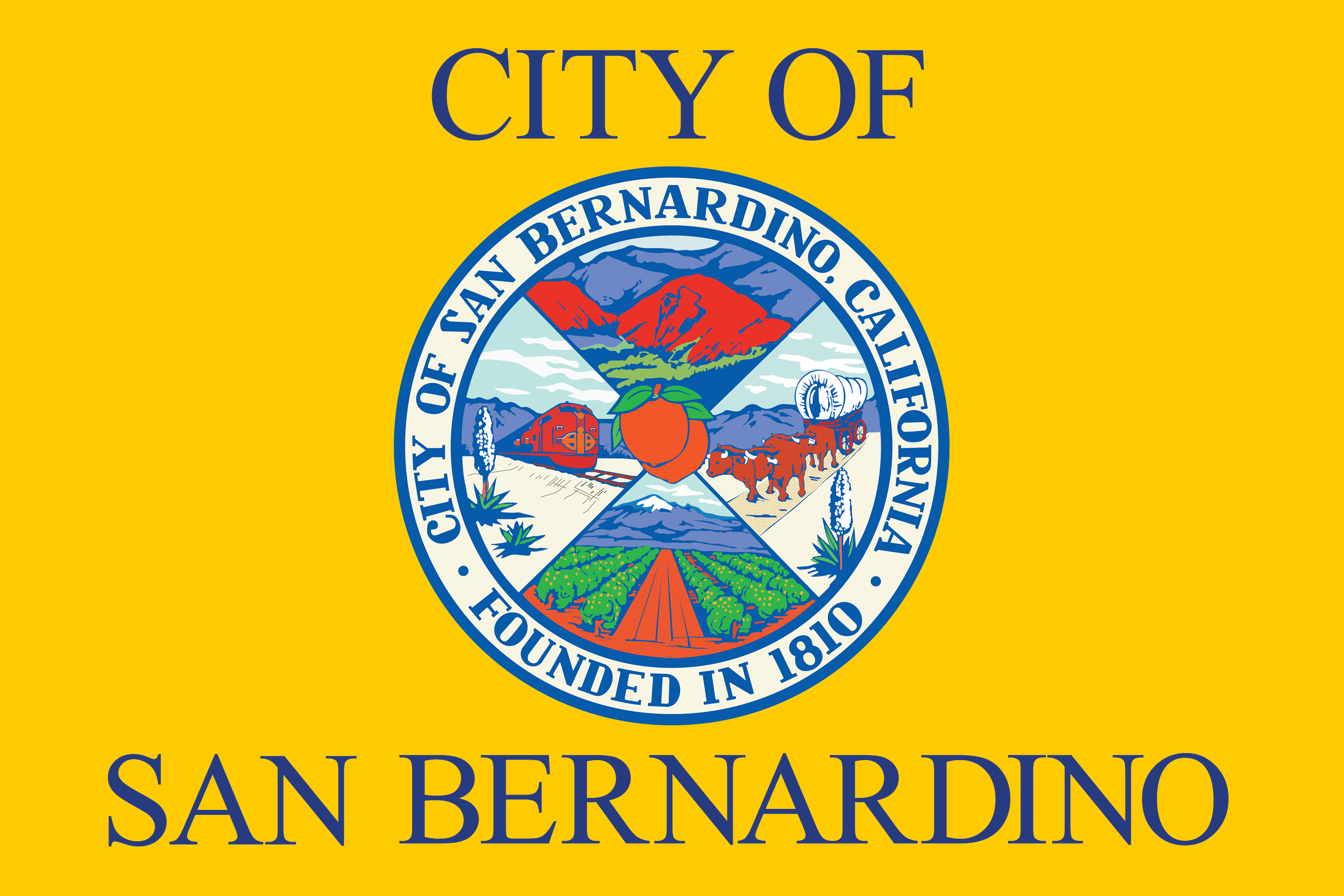
- June 2, 2026 (primary) (Note: Cancelled general election was scheduled for November 3, 2026.)
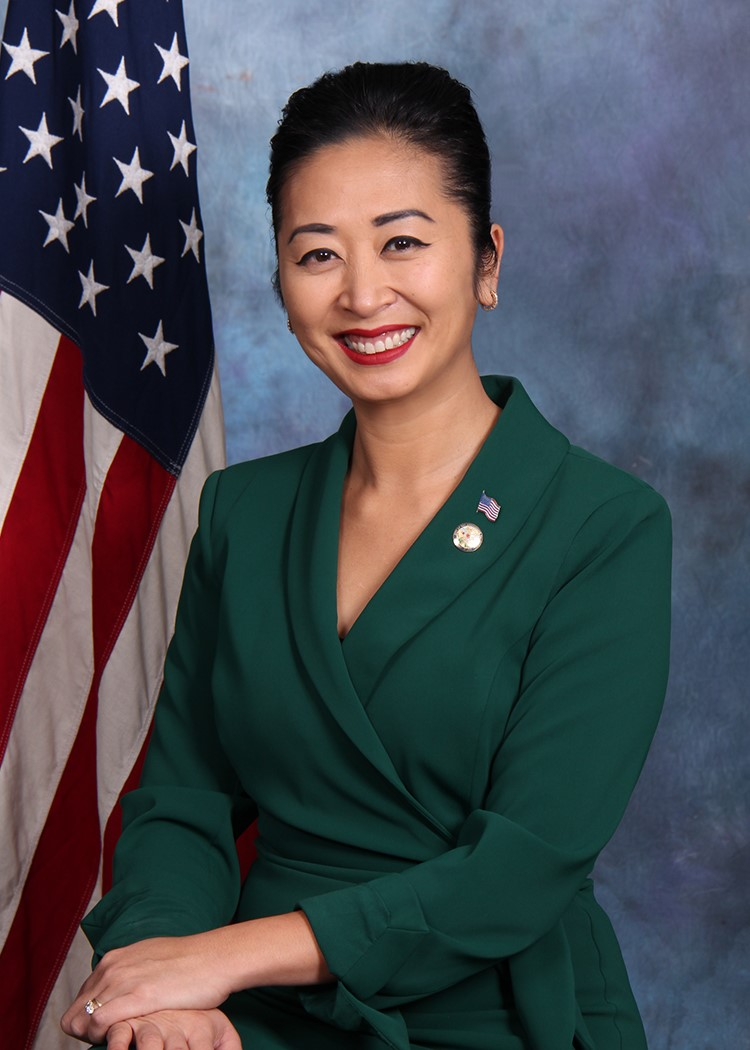

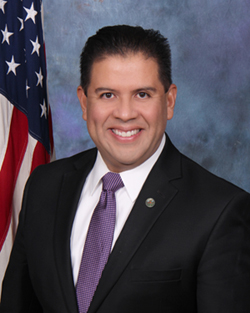
Candidate	Helen Tran	Ivan Garcia	Rick Avila
Popular vote	14,011	2,641	2,610
Percentage	54.65%	10.30%	10.18%
Candidate	Ronnika Ngalande	Amy Malone	John Valdivia
Popular vote	2,509	2,314	1,553
Percentage	9.79%	9.03%	6.06%
Mayor before election
Helen Tran
Elected mayor
Helen Tran

A general election was scheduled to be held on November 3, 2026, to elect the mayor of San Bernardino, California. The top-two primary election took place on June 2, 2026, with incumbent mayor Helen Tran winning re-election to a second term after securing an outright majority of the vote, thereby preventing a general election from taking place.

== Candidates ==
=== Declared ===
- Rick Avila, construction business owner
- Ivan Garcia, planning commissioner
- Amy Malone, public relations consultant
- Ronnika Ngalande, planning commissioner
- Helen Tran, incumbent mayor (2022–present)
- John Valdivia, former mayor (2018–2022)

== Endorsements ==
Helen Tran

Labor unions

- National Union of Healthcare Workers
- Teamsters Joint Council 42

Organizations

- Democratic Mayors Association
- Planned Parenthood

Political parties

- San Bernardino County Democratic Party

== Results ==
2026 San Bernardino mayoral election
Primary election
Candidate	Votes	%
Helen Tran	14,011	54.65%
Ivan Garcia	2,641	10.30%
Rick Avila	2,610	10.18%
Ronnika Ngalande	2,509	9.79%
Amy Malone	2,314	9.03%
John Valdivia	1,553	6.06%
Total votes	25,638	100.0%
