= 2014 San Bernardino mayoral election =

San Bernardino mayoral election, 2014
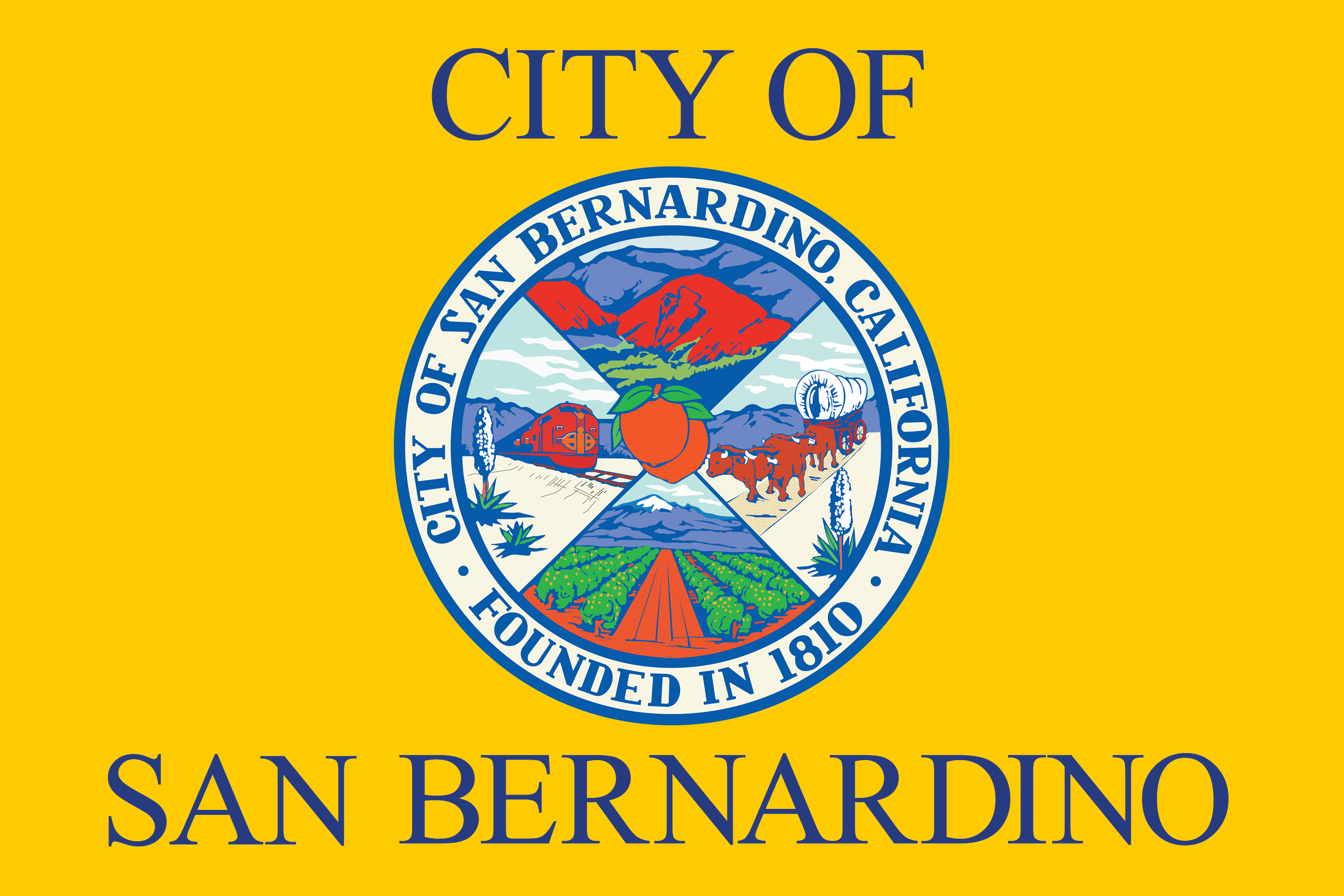
- February 4, 2014
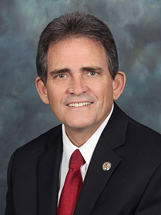

Candidate	R. Carey Davis	Wendy McCammack
Popular vote	6,905	5,242
Percentage	56.85%	43.15%
Mayor before election
Pat Morris
Democratic
Elected mayor
R. Carey Davis

The 2014 San Bernardino mayoral election was held on February 4, 2014, to elect the mayor of San Bernardino, California. It saw the election of R. Carey Davis.

No runoff was necessary.

Municipal elections in California are officially non-partisan.

== Results ==
2014 San Bernardino mayoral election
Candidate	Votes	%
R. Carey Davis	6,905	56.85
Wendy McCammack	5,242	43.15
Total votes	12,147	
