= KVCR =

KVCR may refer to:

- KVCR (FM), a radio station (91.9 FM) licensed to serve San Bernardino, California, United States
- KVCR-DT, a television station (channel 5, virtual 24) licensed to serve San Bernardino, California
