= 2022 San Bernardino mayoral election =

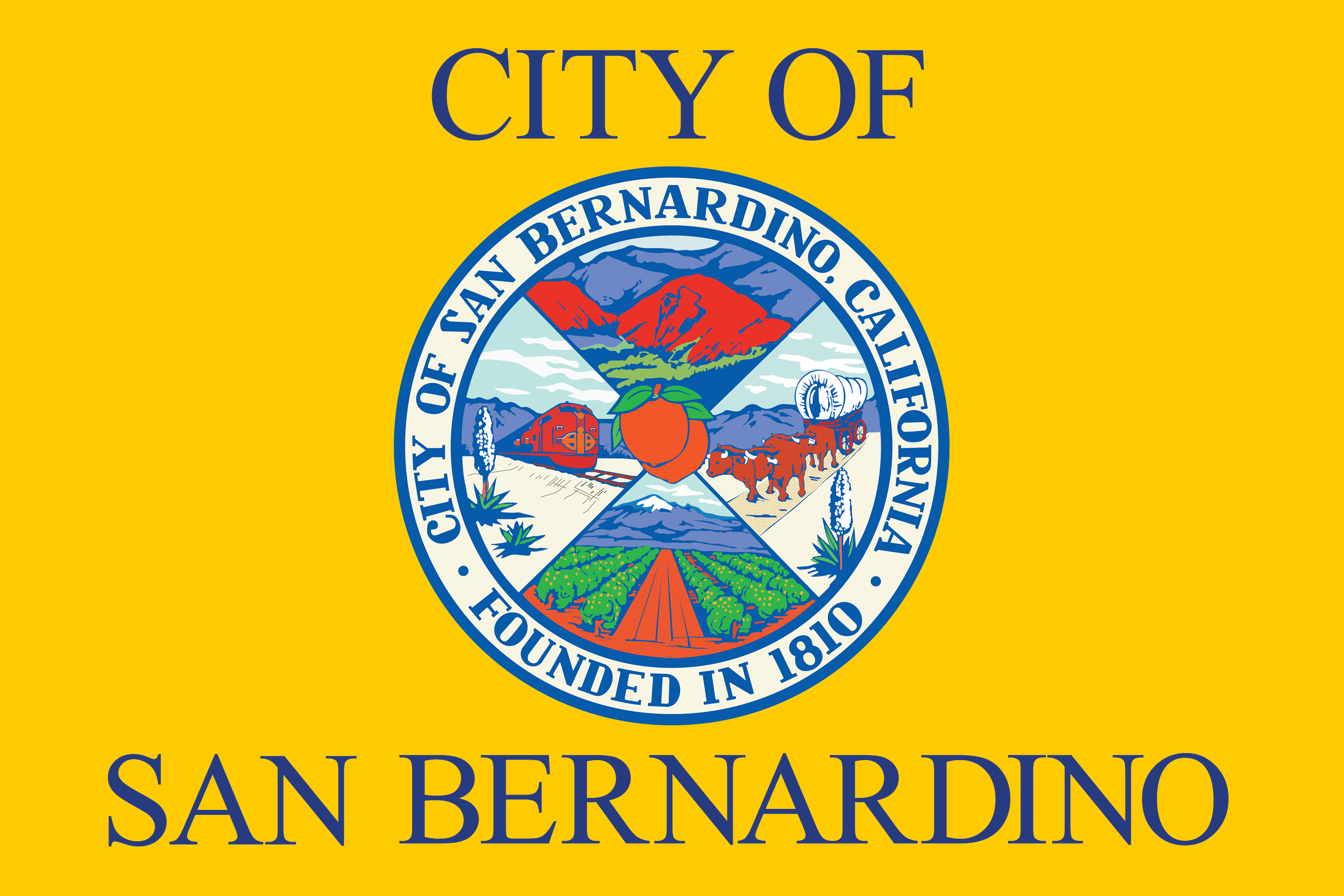
- June 7, 2022 (primary); November 8, 2022 (general)
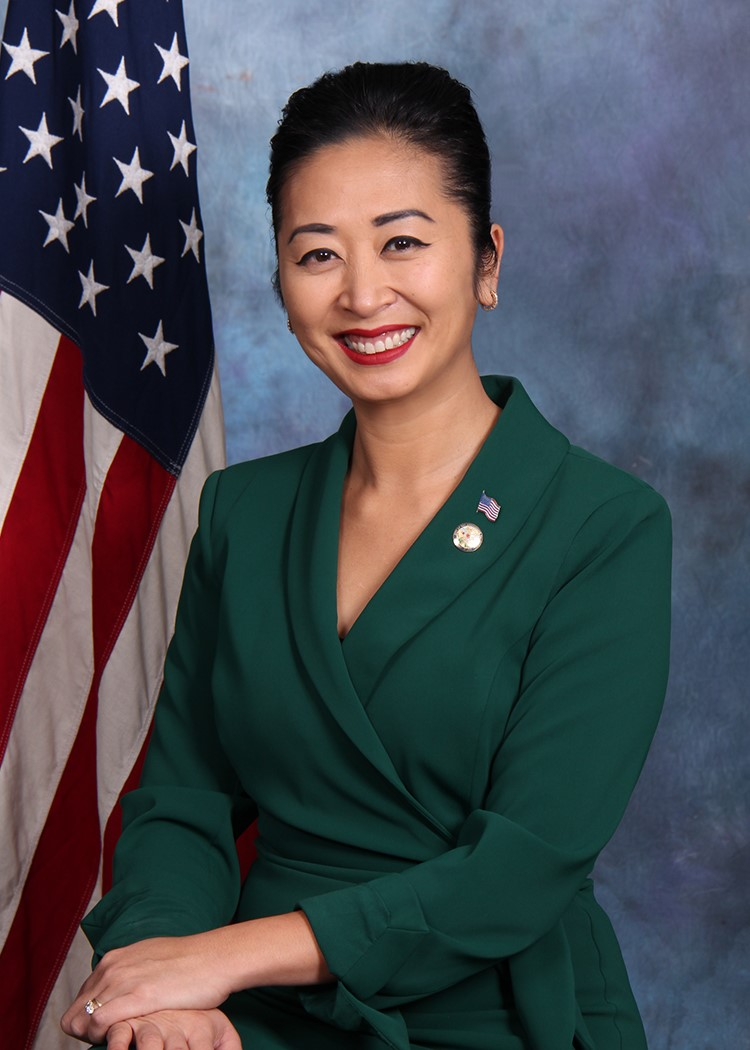

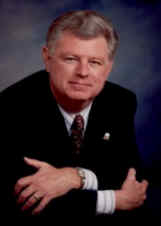

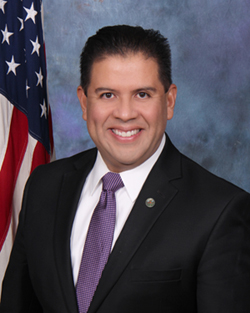

Candidate	Helen Tran	Jim Penman
First round	7,310; 41.65%	3,510; 20.00%
Runoff	16,869; 62.78%	10,002; 37.22%
Candidate	John Valdivia	Treasure Ortiz
First round	2,970; 16.92%	2,375; 13.53%
Mayor before election
John Valdivia
Elected mayor
Helen Tran

The 2022 San Bernardino mayoral election was held on November 8, 2022, to elect the mayor of San Bernardino, California. San Bernardino uses a top-two primary, and the first round of voting was held on June 7, 2022. Candidates could win the election outright by receiving more than 50% of the vote, but no candidate received a majority. Seven candidates took part in the primary election, including incumbent mayor John Valdivia, former City Attorney from 1987 to 2013 Jim Penman, and San Bernardino Director of Human Resources Helen Tran.

== Processes ==
In the first round of voting, Tran received a plurality of the vote with 41.65%, but failed to win outright. Penman earned the second-most number of votes and moved forward to the next round. Incumbent mayor John Valdivia, who had been censured by the City Council for misusing public funds, failed to make it past the first round.

Helen Tran and Jim Penman advanced to the general election held on November 8. Penman was formerly the City Attorney from 1987 to 2013 when he was recalled from office. Penman officially conceded on Wednesday, November 8, by phone.

Tran, who formerly served as the city's Director of Human Resources received 62.7% of the vote, becoming the first Asian-American and third female mayor of the city, and the first Vietnamese American woman elected mayor of any American city.

== Candidates ==
Seven candidates qualified for the June 7, 2022, nonpartisan mayoral primary.

- Helen Tran (Democratic), businesswoman, former director of human resources for San Bernardino and West Covina
- Jim Penman, former San Bernardino city attorney (1987–2013)
- John Valdivia (Republican), incumbent mayor of San Bernardino
- Treasure Ortiz (Democratic), college professor at California State University, San Bernardino and political activist
- Henry Gomez Nickel (Republican), former San Bernardino city councilman from the 5th ward (2014–2020)
- Gabriel Jaramillo
- Mohammad Khan, business owner

== Endorsements ==
Helen Tran

Federal officials

- Ted Lieu, U.S. representative from California

State officials

- Anthony Rendon, speaker of the California State Assembly
- Betty Yee, California State Controller

Local officials

- Pat Morris, former mayor of San Bernardino (2006–2014)
- R. Carey Davis, former mayor of San Bernardino (2014–2018)

Political parties

- San Bernardino County Democratic Party

Labor unions

- Service Employees International Union Local 121RN
- United Food and Commercial Workers Local 1167

Organizations

- CHIRLA Action Fund
- East Valley Association of Realtors
- National Organization for Women, Riverside County chapter
- Planned Parenthood of Orange and San Bernardino Counties' Community Action Fund
- Run for Something

Newspapers

- The San Bernardino Sun and The Press-Enterprise (Southern California News Group editorial board)
Jim Penman

Local officials

- Judith Valles, former mayor of San Bernardino (1998–2006)
- Barbara Flores, member of the San Bernardino City Unified School District Board of Education

Former local officials

- Ben Gonzalez, former chief of the San Bernardino Police Department

== Results ==
2022 San Bernardino mayoral election
Primary election
Candidate	Votes	%
Helen Tran	7,310	41.65%
Jim Penman	3,510	20.00%
John Valdivia (incumbent)	2,970	16.92%
Treasure Ortiz	2,375	13.53%
Henry Gomez Nickel	728	4.15%
Gabriel Jaramillo	459	2.62%
Mohammad Khan	197	1.12%
Total votes	17,549	100.0%
General election
Helen Tran	16,869	62.78%
Jim Penman	10,002	37.22%
Total votes	26,871	100.0%
