= 2005–06 San Bernardino mayoral election =

San Bernardino mayoral election, 2005–06
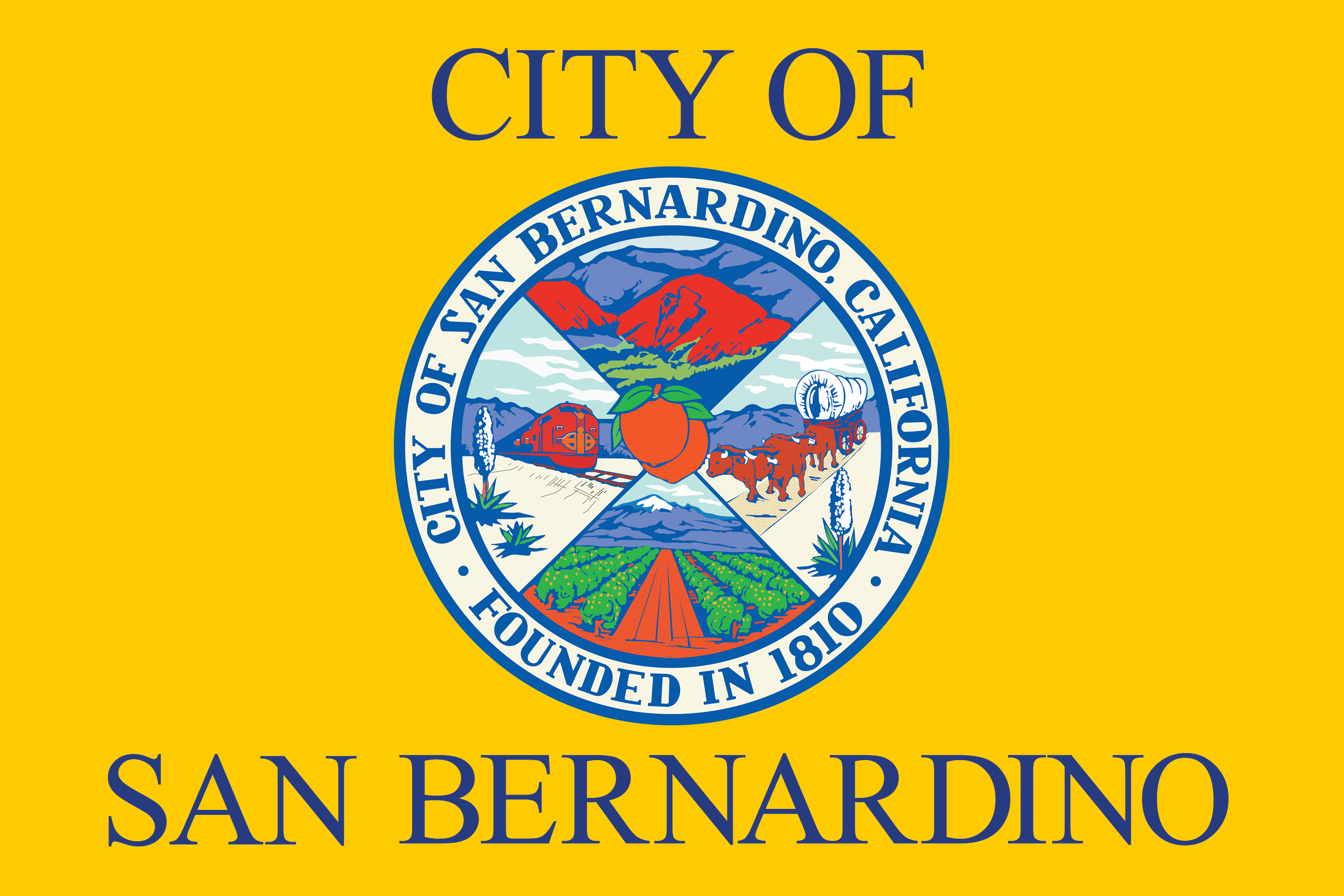
- November 8, 2005; February 7, 2006
- Turnout: 23.34%
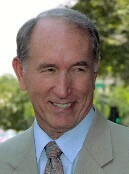

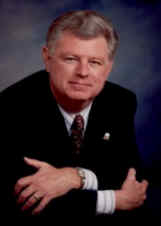
Candidate	Pat Morris	James F. "Jim" Penman
Party	Democratic	Nonpartisan
First-round vote	11,249	6,648
First-round percentage	43.42%	25.66%
Second-round vote	10,093	5,809
Second-round percentage	63.47%	36.53%
Candidate	Chas A. Kelley	Rick Avila
Party	Nonpartisan	Nonpartisan
First-round vote	4,079	3,425
First-round percentage	15.74%	13.22%
Mayor before election
Judith Valles
Elected mayor
Pat Morris
Democratic

The 2005–06 San Bernardino mayoral election was held on November 21, 2005, and February 16, 2006, to elect the mayor of San Bernardino, California. It saw the election of Pat Morris.

== Results ==
=== First round ===
First round results
Candidate	Votes	%
Pat Morris	11,249	43.42
James F. "Jim" Penman	6,648	25.66
Chas A. Kelley	4,079	15.74
Rick Avila	3,425	13.22
Michael Ellison-Lewis	466	1.80
Write-in	42	0.16
Total votes	25,909	

=== Runoff ===
Runoff results
Candidate	Votes	%
Pat Morris	10,093	64.47
James F. "Jim" Penman	5,809	36.53
Total votes	15,902	
Turnout	{{{votes}}}	23.34%
