= 2018 San Bernardino mayoral election =

San Bernardino mayoral election, 2018
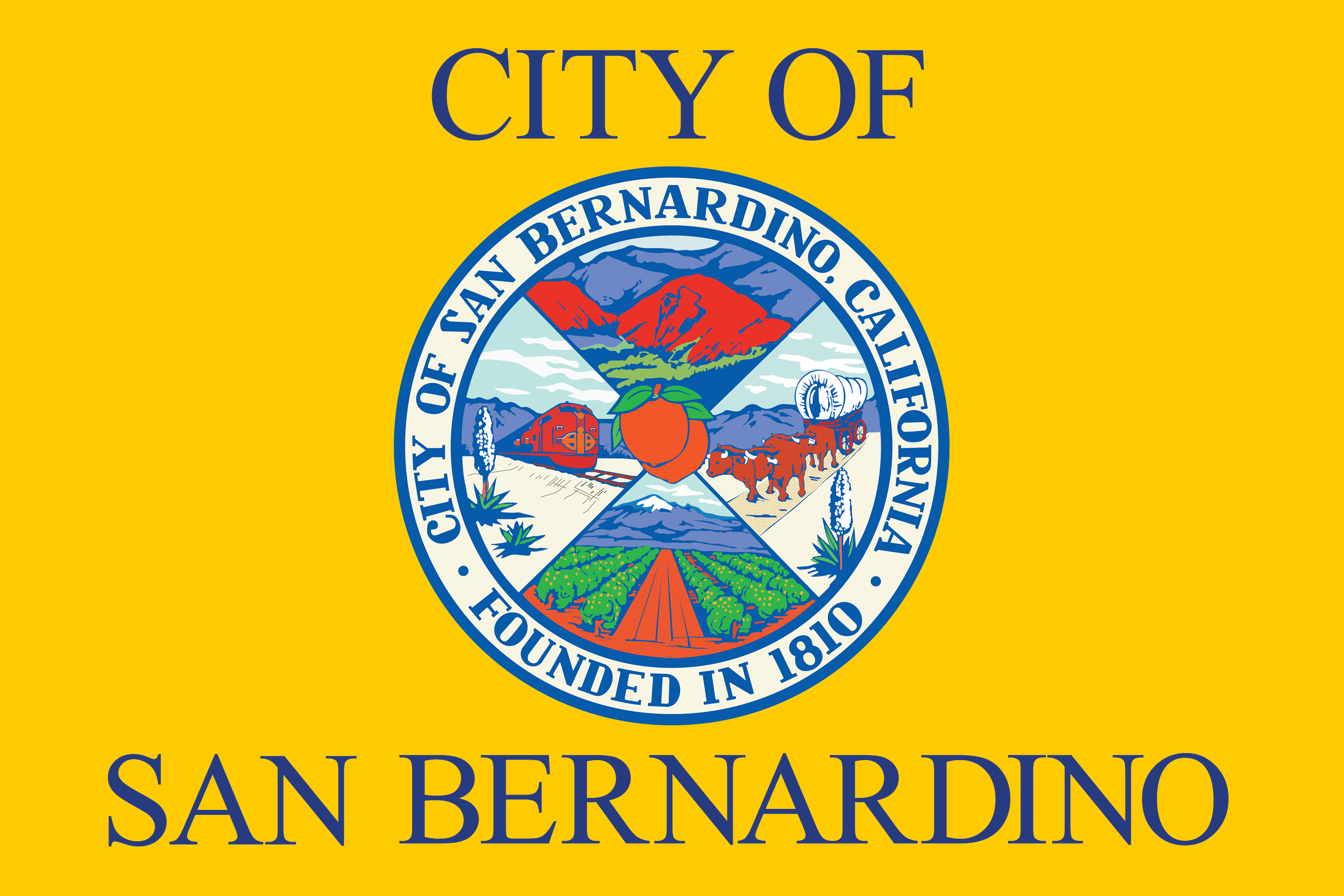
- June 5, 2018 (first round); November 6, 2018 (runoff)
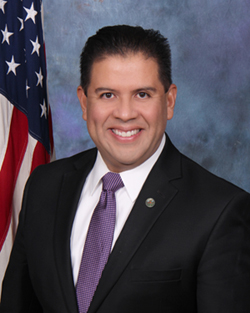

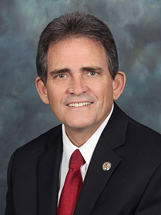

Candidate	John Valdivia	R. Carey Davis	Danny Tillman
First-round vote	6,747	5,243	2,964
First-round percentage	35.75%	27.78%	15.71%
Second-round vote	19,155	17,327
Second-round percentage	52.51%	47.49%
Candidate	Rick Avila	Georgeann Hanna
First-round vote	1,414	1,324
First-round percentage	7.49%	7.02%
Mayor before election
R. Carey Davis
Elected mayor
John Valdivia

The 2018 San Bernardino mayoral election was held on June 5, 2018, and November 6, 2018, to elect the mayor of San Bernardino, California. It saw the election of John Valdivia, who defeated incumbent mayor R. Carey Davis.

Municipal elections in California are officially non-partisan.

== Results ==
=== First round ===
First round results
Candidate	Votes	%
John Valdivia	6,747	35.75
R. Carey Davis (incumbent)	5,243	27.78
Danny Tillman	2,964	15.71
Rick Avila	1,414	7.49
Georgeann "Gigi" Hanna	1,324	7.02
Karmel Roe	732	3.88
Danny Malmuth	448	2.37
Total votes	18,872	100

=== Runoff results ===
Runoff results
Candidate	Votes	%
John Valdivia	19,155	52.51
R. Carey Davis (incumbent)	17,327	47.49
Total votes	36,482	100
