= San Bernardino Valley College =

Community college in San Bernardino, California, US

Coordinates: 34°05′14″N 117°18′38″W

- Former name: San Bernardino Junior College
- Motto: 'Your future starts here.'
- Type: Community College
- Established: 1926
- Affiliations: San Bernardino Community College District
- Chancellor: Diana Z. Rodriguez
- President: Dr. Scott W. Thayer (interim)
- Faculty: 577 (148 Full-time & 429 Part-time)
- Administrative staff: 459
- Students: 17,044
- Location: San Bernardino, California, United States
- Campus: Urban, 82 acres (33 ha)
- Colors: Blue and Gray
- Mascots: Wolverines (2001–present), Indians (1926–2000)
- Website: www.valleycollege.edu

San Bernardino Valley College is a public community college in San Bernardino, California. It is accredited by the Western Association of Schools and Colleges. The college has an enrollment of 17,044 students and covers 82 acres (33 ha). Valley College is also a part of the San Bernardino Community College District which includes Crafton Hills College located in nearby Yucaipa and the Professional Development Center in San Bernardino.

== History ==
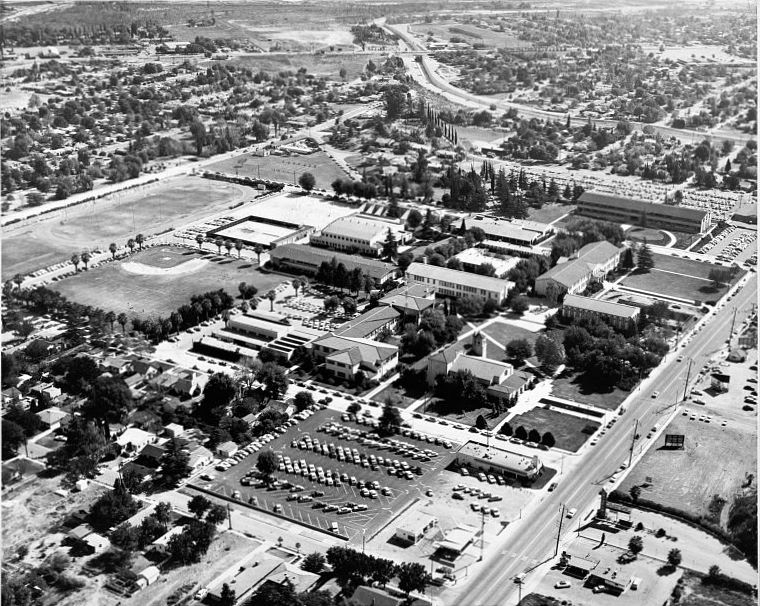
San Bernardino Junior College, circa 1933

San Bernardino Junior College was established in 1926. Its campus was split between San Bernardino High School and Colton High School and consisted of 140 students and one administrator, George H. Jantzen, who was dean of the college. Today, San Bernardino Valley College offers classes to 25,000 students and runs on an annual budget of $59 million. The college district, which includes two campuses, has 148 full-time faculty, 429 part-time faculty and staff of 459. It serves multiple high school districts, and the district encompasses nearly 500 square miles (1,300 km^{2}).

== Academics ==
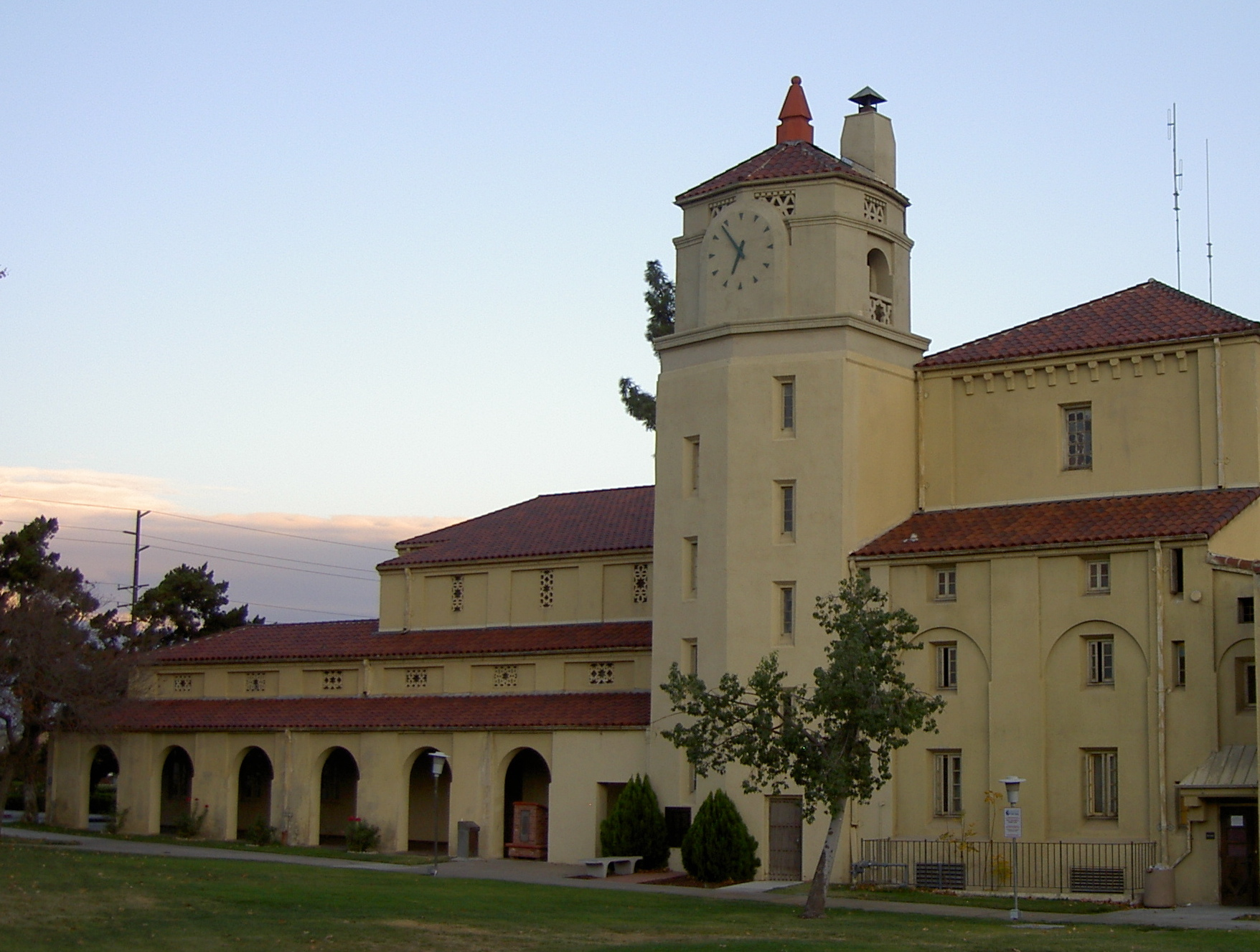
SBVC's historic Spanish Colonial Revival auditorium.

The college offers courses that correspond to the lower division requirements of the University of California and the California State University system so qualified students can transfer to four-year institutions with junior standing. The college also provides specialized programs that lead directly to employment or to improving the skill and knowledge of those already employees in the work force. These include Associate of Arts degree programs, Associate of Science degree programs, and certificates.

== Student life ==
San Bernardino Valley College also offers its students a diverse selection of clubs. At San Bernardino Valley College there are more than 30 clubs and organizations representing a variety of academic and career pursuits. There are also a number of special interest groups.

== Middle College High School at SBVC ==
Middle College High School (MCHS) is one of nine high schools in the San Bernardino City Unified School District (SBCUSD). There are six comprehensive high schools and three additional alternative/continuation high schools. MCHS is identified as a specialized alternative high school focused on dual enrollment for underserved, underprepared and traditionally underrepresented populations.

MCHS was designed in 2001 as an alternative high school for high potential but underperforming students as a joint project of the SBCUSD and San Bernardino Valley College (SBVC). MCHS is located directly north of the SBVC campus and draws its students from the entire attendance area of SBCUSD.

Students who attend MCHS are concurrently enrolled at MCHS and SBVC, where students are able to earn a significant number of college units while completing their high school diploma. Each year, a number of MCHS graduating seniors do earn the Associates of Arts Degree from SBVC. The vision of MCHS is that every MCHS scholar will graduate from a four-year college with preparation for career, leadership, and personal success.

== Athletics ==
San Bernardino Valley College is a member of the Inland Empire Athletic Conference (IEAC) for nine of its 12 sports. Men's and women's track and field are not sponsored by the IEAC. SBVC football is a member of the American Division-Mountain Conference in the Southern California Football Association (SCFA). Each sport has a different competitive alignment within the conference.

From 1926 to 2000 SBVC's fight name was the Indians. In January 2001, it was changed to the Wolverines.

The men's and women's basketball teams played their home games in the Joseph W. Snyder Gymnasium from 1975 to 2016.

Fall sports:

- Cross country (men's)
- Cross country (women's)
- Soccer (men's)
- Soccer (women's)
- Football
- Volleyball (women's)

Winter sports:

- Basketball (men's)
- Basketball (women's)

Spring sports:

- Baseball
- Softball
- Track and field (men's)
- Track and field (women's)

== Seismic reconstruction ==
The college's original builders were unaware of local fault hazards, and constructed the campus upon an elevated pressure ridge (the Bunker Hill Dike) along the San Jacinto Fault Zone, which bisects the campus and ran under the foundations of some buildings. Between 2001 and 2010, several of the campus' major buildings have been demolished and new ones built nearby.

=== Original survey ===
In 1935, with the damage from the 1933 Long Beach earthquake still a recent memory, SBVC hired John Buwalda of the Caltech Seismological Laboratory to assess seismic hazards. Buwalda discovered and reported the presence of the fault, specifically recommending "a thousand-foot-wide zone of no building, which basically took in almost the entire campus. They [SBVC] ignored his advice, even though they paid for his report."

=== 1990s ===
The trustees of SBVC hired Professor Kerry Sieh, also of Caltech, to perform a seismic hazard study in 1995–96. This confirmed the danger of the fault to the campus. Excavated trenches revealed that the surface trace of the fault passed through four of the school's buildings. Eight other buildings were determined to be at risk due to secondary ground fracturing or their location across an active surface fold caused by shallow blind thrust faulting. The buildings, most over 50 years old, were not built to modern seismic standards and it was decided that creating new buildings away from, and parallel to, the fault would be more sensible than retrofitting the aging ones.

=== 2000–2010 ===
Buildings replaced included the Administration Building, the Library, the Student Center/Cafeteria Building, the Art Building, the Physical Sciences Buildings, the Life Science Building, and North Hall. Prominently preserved is the Auditorium. Built in 1938 by the Works Progress Administration, the ornate building contains the clock tower that is featured on many of the college's publications.

== Notable alumni ==
- Susan Anton: singer and actress; Miss California 1969; second runner-up Miss America 1969
- Bob Bees: American football player
- George Brown, Jr.: member of the United States House of Representatives from 1963–1971 and 1973–1999, representing the San Bernardino and Riverside regions of California
- John Butler (American Football): National Football League General manager of the Buffalo Bills and the San Diego Chargers.
- Wilmer Carter: Member of the California State Assembly, 62nd District from 2002–present and namesake of Wilmer Amina Carter High School
- Julio Cruz (baseball): former professional baseball player who played second base in the major leagues from 1977–1986; with the Seattle Mariners, from 1978 through 1983, he stole over 40 bases each season and was the team's all-time leader in that statistic.
- Rich Dauer: former professional baseball player who played with the Baltimore Orioles primarily as an infielder from 1976–85; was an All-American at the University of Southern California and helped the Trojans win the 1974 College World Series; currently the third base coach for the Colorado Rockies
- Gerald R. Eaves: San Bernardino County Board of Supervisors from 1992–2000; California State Assemblyman from 1984–1992; Mayor of Rialto from 1980–1984; Rialto City Council from 1977–1980.
- Dino Ebel: Third base coach for the Los Angeles Dodgers
- Johnnie Harris: Arena Football League defensive specialist with the Philadelphia Soul. He has previously played for the Tampa Bay Storm (1996–1998), the Orlando Predators (2005), and the Grand Rapids Rampage (2006). Harris also played in the National Football League as a defensive back for the Oakland Raiders (1999–2001) and the New York Giants (2000–2003)
- Bobby Hosea: SBVC football player, actor; played in over 70 TV and film lead roles, including The O.J. Simpson Story and D.C. Sniper: 23 Days of Fear
- Ken Hubbs: second baseman who played from 1961 to 1963 for the Chicago Cubs in the National League
- Al Jury: football official in the National Football League (NFL) from 1978 to 2004 as a field judge then as a back judge when the league swapped position names in 1998. Over the course of his NFL career, Jury was selected to officiate in a record-tying five Super Bowls: XX in 1986, XXII in 1988, XXIV in 1990, XXVIII in 1994 and XXXIV in 2000
- Dirk Kempthorne: U.S. Secretary of the Interior from 2006–2009; Governor of Idaho from 1999–2006; U.S. Senator from Idaho from 1993–1999
- Jerry Lewis (politician): member of the United States House of Representatives since 1979, representing the California's 41st congressional district; former chairman of the House Appropriations Committee
- Pat Morris (politician): Mayor of San Bernardino 2006–2014; founder the San Bernardino Boys and Girls Club; Judge, San Bernardino County Superior Court from 1976–2005
- Craig Newsome: NFL cornerback who played for the Green Bay Packers and the San Francisco 49ers. He was the starting cornerback on the 1996 Green Bay Packers championship team. He also had a forced fumble and an interception in Super Bowl XXXI
- Chris Parker: American football player
- Joseph C. Rodriguez: United States Army soldier who was awarded the Medal of Honor - the United States' highest military decoration for his actions near Munye-ri, Korea during the Korean War
- Julie Sommars: actress; nominated for a Golden Globe Award for Best Supporting Actress in a Drama
- Twyla Tharp: dancer and choreographer. She has won Emmy and Tony awards, and currently works as a choreographer in New York City
- John Trudell: author, poet, actor, musician, and Native American political activist
- Mike Ulufale: American football player
- Judith Valles: Mayor of San Bernardino 1997–2005, she is the first Latina elected mayor in the City's history; in 2001 she ran unopposed for a second term
- Tyree Washington: sprinter; 5-time gold medalist in the 4 × 400 m relay and the 400m
- Jim Weatherwax: member of the Super Bowl I champion Green Bay Packers
- Jimmy Webb: songwriter; his compositions include "Up, Up and Away", "By the Time I Get to Phoenix", "Wichita Lineman", "Galveston" and "MacArthur Park". His songs have been recorded or performed by Glen Campbell, The 5th Dimension, Richard Harris, Frank Sinatra, Elvis Presley, Isaac Hayes, and R.E.M., among others
- Charles E. Young: Chancellor emeritus and professor at the UCLA School of Public Affairs; chancellor of the University of California, Los Angeles from 1968–1997; president of the University of Florida 1999–2004; currently the chief executive officer of the Los Angeles Museum of Contemporary Art

== In popular culture ==
- In the Moonlighting episode "The Dream Sequence Always Rings Twice," David Addison is woken up while wearing an SBVC Indians basketball jersey.

== See also ==
- Category:San Bernardino Valley College alumni
