= 2009 San Bernardino mayoral election =

San Bernardino mayoral election, 2009
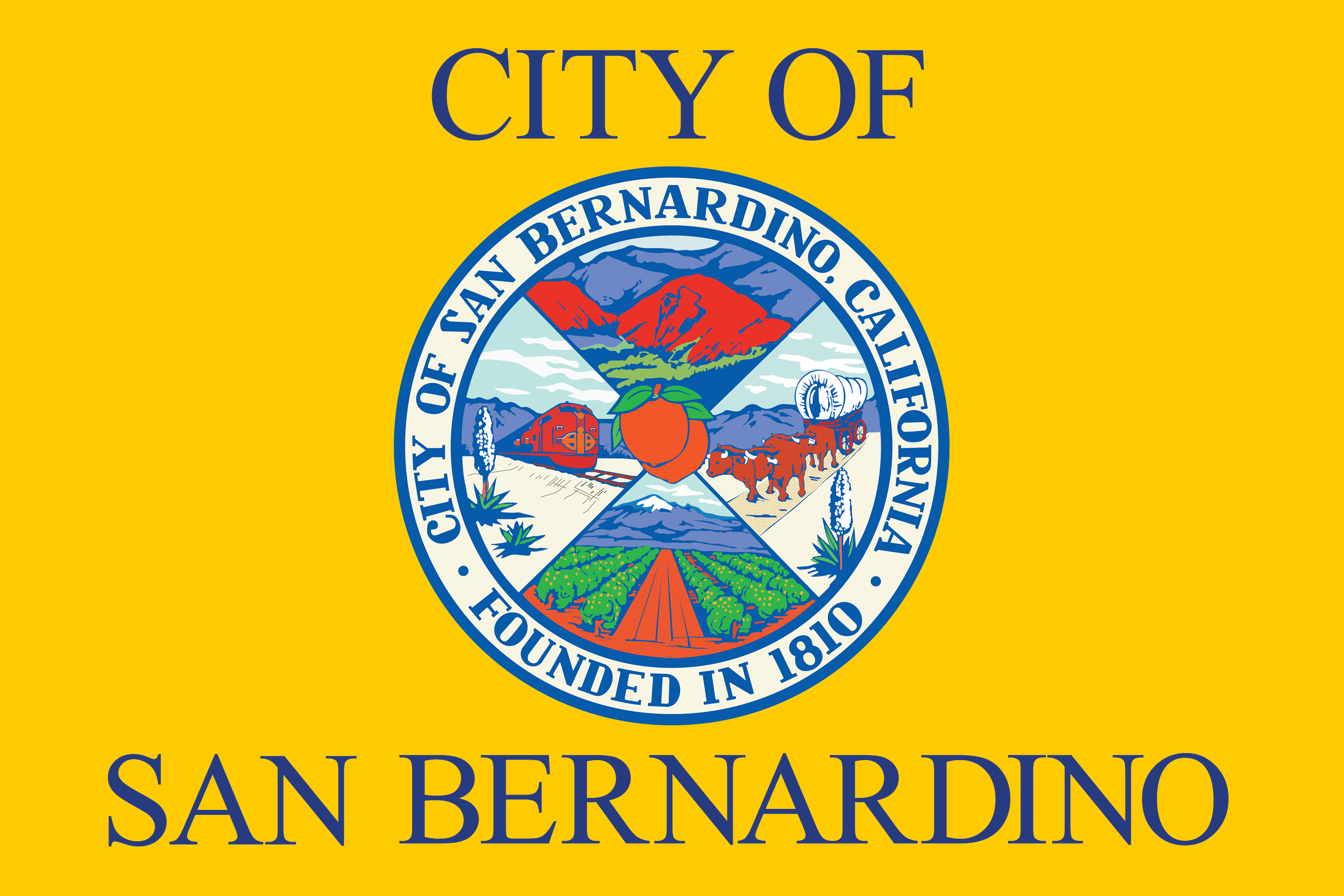
- November 3, 2009
- Turnout: 21.92%
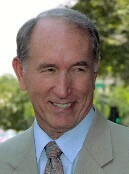

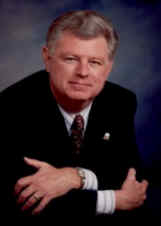

| Candidate | Pat Morris | James F. “Jim” Penman |
| Party | Democratic | Nonpartisan |
| Popular vote | 8,349 | 5,376 |
| Percentage | 55.05% | 35.45% |
| Candidate | Rick Avila |
| Party | Nonpartisan |
| Popular vote | 1,205 |
| Percentage | 7.95% |
Mayor before election
Pat Morris
Democratic
Elected mayor
Pat Morris
Democratic

The 2009 San Bernardino mayoral election was held on November 3, 2009, to elect the mayor of San Bernardino, California. It saw the reelection of incumbent mayor Pat Morris.

A candidate won out right pass 50% No runoff was needed.

== Results ==
Results
| Candidate | Votes | % |
|---|---|---|
| Pat Morris (incumbent) | 8,349 | 55.05 |
| Jim Penman | 5,376 | 35.45 |
| Rick Avila | 1,205 | 7.95 |
| Total votes | 15,166 | |
