= Bob Holcomb =

American politician

27th and 29th Mayor of San Bernardino
- In office 1971–1985
- Preceded by: Al Ballard
- Succeeded by: Evlyn Wilcox
- In office 1989–1993
- Preceded by: Evlyn Wilcox
- Succeeded by: Tom Minor

Personal details
- Born: March 1, 1922 San Bernardino, California, U.S.
- Died: November 29, 2010 (aged 88) Loma Linda, California, U.S.
- Spouse: Penny Holcomb (1946–2010, his death)
- Education: UC Berkeley, UC Hastings College of Law
- Profession: lawyer, politician

William Robert "Bob" Holcomb (March 1, 1922 – November 29, 2010) was an American politician and attorney. Holcomb was the longest serving mayor of San Bernardino, California, to date. He held office as San Bernardino's mayor from 1971 until 1985, and returned to office again from 1989 until 1993. Holcomb has been widely credited with preserving the independence of the San Bernardino Valley Municipal Water District and its local water supply.

== Biography ==
=== Early life ===
Holcomb was born on March 1, 1922, in San Bernardino, California to Grant Holcomb and Eleanor Burkham Holcomb. Holcomb was the great-grandson of prospector William F. Holcomb, who first discovered gold in 1860 while hunting for bears in the San Bernardino Mountains near Big Bear Lake. The region of William Holcomb's discovery in the San Bernardino Mts. is still known as Holcomb Valley. Bob Holcomb's father, Grant Holcomb, served as the mayor of San Bernardino from 1925 until 1927.

He graduated from San Bernardino High School in 1940 and enrolled at the University of California, Berkeley. However, Holcomb left UC-Berkeley before completing his bachelor's degree in order to enlist in the U.S. Army on October 13, 1942. Holcomb served in the United States Army Air Corps during World War II for three years as a B-17 pilot with the 412th Bomb Squadron, 95th Bomb Group. He flew military bombing missions from the United Kingdom to Nazi Germany during the war.

Holcomb was honorably discharged from the U.S. Army on October 26, 1945. He married his wife, Pearl "Penny" Pennington, on July 7, 1946. The couple had four children - Jay, William, Robert and Terri Lee.

Holcomb returned to the University of California, Berkeley, where he completed his Bachelor of Arts in law on June 16, 1949. He then received a law degree from the University of California, Hastings College of the Law in 1950. He worked as an attorney for fourteen years before entering public office in 1964.

=== Political career ===
He began his political career as a leading opponent of a proposed merger between San Bernardino's local water district, San Bernardino Valley Municipal Water District, with the larger Metropolitan Water District of Southern California (MWD), based in Los Angeles. During the 1964 election, voters in the eastern San Bernardino Valley were asked in a ballot question whether they wanted to keep the San Bernardino Valley Municipal Water District as an independent entity or merge it into the neighboring Metropolitan Water District of Southern California. Holcomb spearheaded the campaign to preserve local water rights for the city of San Bernardino.

Supporters of the merger, which included San Bernardino's major media, political and business figures, argued that the city would suffer water shortages if local communities did not link with the MWD, which draws its water supply from the Colorado River. Proponents of the merger included the editor and editorial board of San Bernardino's major newspaper, The San Bernardino Sun, which was called the Sun-Telegram at the time. To counter the influence of The San Bernardino Sun-Telegram editorial page on the water issue, Holcomb founded and distributed his own small, weekly newspaper, "The Independent Press" (later re-founded as the city's major weekly published media retitled "San Bernardino's Free Press"), to publish opposition views of the proposal.

Holcomb successfully led the election campaign to retain the San Bernardino Valley Municipal Water District's independence. Voters defeated the proposal in 1964 and Holcomb has since been widely credited with retaining San Bernardino's local water rights. Shortly after the water merger's electoral defeat, then San Bernardino Mayor Donald G. "Bud" Mauldin appointed Holcomb president of the city's Board of Water Commissioners on May 4, 1964.

Holcomb's preservation of San Bernardino's local water rights is also credited with attracting California State University system to the city, which constructed California State University, San Bernardino. A local supply of water was needed to construct the campus.

=== Mayor of San Bernardino ===
Holcomb served as Mayor of San Bernardino from 1971 until 1985. He returned to office again from 1989 until 1993. Holcomb oversaw the completion of several new projects in the city during his tenure. These included the construction of the San Bernardino City Hall; the western headquarters of the Little League; the Central City Mall, which is now called the Carousel Mall; and the San Bernardino County administrative center. An eleven-foot statue of Martin Luther King Jr. was also installed in San Bernardino under Holcomb's direction.

Holcomb died of heart failure at Jerry L. Pettis Memorial Veterans Medical Center in Loma Linda, California, on November 29, 2010, at the age of 88. He was survived by his wife since 1946, Penny Holcomb, and three children - Terri Lee Holcomb-Halstead, William Holcomb and Robert Holcomb. His fourth child, Jay Holcomb, died in 1977. Penny Holcomb died four months later.

On May 6, 2014, San Bernardino City Unified School District's Board voted unanimously to rename Little Mountain Elementary School after Holcomb.
