= Wildwood Canyon =

Valley in California, United States of America

Coordinates: 34°00′52″N 117°01′10″W

Wildwood Canyon is a canyon and California state park in the eastern foothills of the San Bernardino Mountains, within San Bernardino County, southern California.

It is located near the city of Yucaipa, in the Inland Empire region. It is surrounded by the San Bernardino National Forest on the eastern and northern sides.

== History ==
The indigenous Cahuilla were traditionally active in the area of Wildwood Canyon, as were the Serrano and Tongva. The area near Yucaipa was known as a crossroads for traveling indigenous people.

Historic buildings remain in the park from the 1930s Hi Up House ranch and 1940s Hunt Ranch eras.

After a flood threatened developers' housing subdivision plans, the California Department of Parks and Recreation acquired 900 acres (360 ha) in the canyon. In May 2003 a park dedication ceremony was held at Wildwood Canyon.

== Wildwood Canyon State Park ==
Wildwood Canyon State Park is currently open only for day use, from sunrise to sunset. The primary activities are horseback riding, hiking, and mountain biking.

The canyon lies between the San Andreas Fault on the north and the San Jacinto Fault to the south.

Wildwood Canyon hosts diverse wildlife. Birds commonly seen include the California quail, western meadowlark, towhee, phainopepla, red-tailed hawk, Bewicks wren, Bullocks oriole, and white-tailed kite. Bobcats, black bears, and gray foxes can be found in the park. Mountain lions use the canyon as a wildlife corridor. The San Diego pocket mouse, a threatened species due to declining to habitat loss, is found in the canyon.

The dominant plant communities are grasslands in most open areas, and chaparral and sage scrub on the slopes. Dominant chaparral plants include chamise (Adenostoma fasciculatum), scrub oak (Quercus berberidifolia), California lilacs (Ceanothus), black sage (Salvia mellifera), buckwheats, monkey flowers, Our Lord's candle (Hesperoyucca whipplei), and silk tassel bush (Garrya).

Coast live oak (Quercus agrifolia) and California sycamore (Platanus racemosa) woodlands are found along drainages and in the canyons.

== See also ==
- California chaparral and woodlands
- Protected areas of San Bernardino County, California
- San Bernardino Mountains topics
