= May Montoya Jones =

American clubwoman

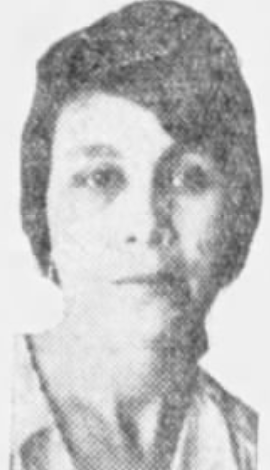
- May Montoya, from a 1919 newspaper
- Born: Mary Montoya Cole; 1880s Texas
- Died: 1973 (age 89)
- Other names: Sunflower, Warcaziwin, May Jones Montoya, Marie M. Jones, May Jones
- Occupation(s): Clubwoman, lecturer, writer

May Montoya Cole Jones (born about 1884, died 1973) also known as Warcaziwin or Sunflower, was an American writer, lecturer, and clubwoman based in Los Angeles, California.

== Early life ==
Mary "May" Montoya Cole was born in Texas, the daughter of John Albert Cole and Carolina Montoya Cole. Her father was a physician from Illinois; her mother was from Texas. She had younger brothers Robert Fontaine Cole and John Albert Cole.

== Career ==
As a young woman, Montoya wrote about boxing and legal subjects for the Los Angeles Express and Los Angeles Herald newspapers. She also wrote for periodicals, including New Outlook. She was adopted into the family of Oglala Sioux chief Luther Standing Bear in Los Angeles in 1929, and welcomed at Pine Ridge Indian Reservation in 1934. She assisted Standing Bear in writing True Stories of the Sioux, My Indian Boyhood, and Land of the Spotted Eagle (1933). She managed Standing Bear's business affairs from 1935, and held the rights to these books when Standing Bear died in 1939.

In Los Angeles, Jones was president of the American Indian Woman's History and Art Club, and secretary of the American Indian Women's Club and the Popular Science Society. She spoke on American Indian history and culture at the Southwest Museum in 1928, and to various church and community groups, often in costume and with music and slides. In 1932, in connection with the 1932 Summer Olympics in Los Angeles, she was slated to represent Native American religious traditions at a Parliament of World Religions.

Jones was connected with the San Bernardino County Museum later in life; she spoke at the museum's annual gala in 1960 and 1964. In 1963, she taught a class in ethnology at the museum. and the museum published her booklet, The Lore and Symbolism of Birds and their Relation to Man. One of her speeches was reprinted in Aboriginal American Oratory: The Tradition of Eloquence among the Indians of the United States (1965).

== Personal life and legacy ==
In 1910, Mary Cole married O. G. (Orange Glen) Jones, one of the founders of Huntington Park. Her husband was describe as being a Pawnee, and a collector of "ancient pottery and relics". The Joneses divorced in 1935. She lived in Yucaipa with her brothers in the 1960s. She died in 1973, at the age of 89. Some of her collected artifacts are on display at the Crazy Horse Memorial.
