= KVCR-DT =

Television station in San Bernardino, California

- San Bernardino–Riverside–; Palm Springs, California; United States
- City: San Bernardino, California
- Channels: Digital: 5 (VHF); Virtual: 24
- Branding: KVCR PBS

Programming
- Affiliations: 24.1: PBS; for others, see § Subchannels

Ownership
- Owner: San Bernardino Community College District
- Sister stations: KVCR

History
- First air date: September 11, 1962
- Former call signs: KVCR-TV (1962–2009)
- Former channel numbers: Analog: 24 (UHF, 1962–2009); Digital: 26 (UHF, 2004–2019)
- Former affiliations: NET (1962–1970)
- Call sign meaning: Valley College Radio

Technical information
- Licensing authority: FCC
- Facility ID: 58795
- ERP: 25.8 kW
- HAAT: 540 m (1,772 ft)
- Transmitter coordinates: 33°57′57.4″N 117°17′9.1″W
- Translator(s): 22 KJHP-LD (Morongo Valley) (Palm Springs)

Links
- Public license information: Public file; LMS
- Website: www.kvcr.org

KVCR-DT (channel 24) is a PBS member television station in San Bernardino, California, United States. It is owned by the San Bernardino Community College District alongside NPR member KVCR (91.9 FM). The two stations share studios at the Media & Communications Building on the campus of San Bernardino Valley College on South Mt. Vernon Avenue in San Bernardino; KVCR-DT's transmitter is located atop Box Springs Mountain.

KVCR is Southern California's oldest operating public television station, beginning broadcasts in September 1962. As public stations signed on in the Los Angeles area, KVCR continued to provide local programming for the Inland Empire as well as telecourses from San Bernardino Valley College and instructional content for schools. The station had a limited broadcast range until it moved its transmitter to Box Springs Mountain in 1983.

In the 2000s, KVCR replaced KOCE as the public television station broadcast into the Coachella Valley, including Palm Springs; it continues to operate a translator and provide a dedicated subchannel, KVCR PBS Desert Cities, for this area. KVCR is also the founding station for the First Nations Experience network, which was started in 2010 with a gift from the San Manuel Band of Mission Indians. State government support in the early 2020s forestalled a cost-cutting plan which would have seen the KVCR stations switch from public media to student-run outlets. KVCR produces local programming for the Inland Empire.

== History ==
=== Early years ===
In 1959, the board of trustees of San Bernardino Valley College gave approval for an exploratory study on activating ultra high frequency (UHF) channel 24, which had been allocated for educational television use by the Federal Communications Commission (FCC) in 1952 but was never assigned; recent changes in state law had allowed the community college to set up and finance its own TV station. The college applied for a construction permit on August 12, 1960, even though trustees were at first hesitant about the concept. One trustee wanted to merely apply for the permit to keep the college's hold on the channel. The FCC granted the permit on July 6, 1961, but trustees initially rejected funds to build the station in a 3–2 vote. The chairman of the board of trustees, in casting the deciding vote, stated, "I personally believe it is not our function to take education beyond the campus, here."

Less than a month after that vote, with high community interest in the project, trustees changed their minds and unanimously voted to build out KVCR-TV, which would be the first educational television station in the state to be run by a junior college. It was seen as more cost-effective to broadcast on campus than to wire campus buildings for a closed-circuit system. Construction of the facility was complete by June 12, 1962, when the first test pattern was sent out, but the first program was not broadcast until September 11. That night, after 15 minutes, the station went off the air because a capacitor failed in the transmitter. KVCR-TV was the only educational station to broadcast in Southern California at the time of its creation. In addition to educational programs for schools and college telecourses, the station also presented educational programs from National Educational Television (NET), forerunner to PBS.

The station grew quickly. Originally broadcasting 10 to 15 hours a week, it doubled its output to 30 hours in 1963. By 1965, KVCR-TV was broadcasting daytime instructional television for 23 school districts in San Bernardino County, including on translators to rebroadcast its signal. KVCR-TV also served as an extension of the broadcasting program at Valley College. The station was entirely student-operated and by 1967 aired 10 to 15 hours a week of local programs, including a weekly public affairs program as well as a daily newscast during the school year. Even though National Educational Television began feeding programs on network lines to stations in 1967, KVCR-TV continued to receive all its NET and PBS programming through KCET in Los Angeles until it was directly connected to the network in June 1972.

With a small signal originating from the Valley College campus, the station's coverage was limited for most of the first 20 years of its history. In 1973, a translator was activated near the campus of the University of California, Riverside; this expanded KVCR-TV coverage to Riverside, which was blocked from the main San Bernardino signal by terrain. The university also had television production capabilities and could produce programs for air on the station. A volunteer support group for KVCR radio and television, Friends of KVCR, was formed in 1973; the next year, the station received a federal grant that allowed it to upgrade to all-color broadcasting. The transmitter had been previously modified to allow the station to pass through network programs in color, a fact station officials were not aware of until they were called by a viewer who complimented them on their color signal.

=== Regional growth ===
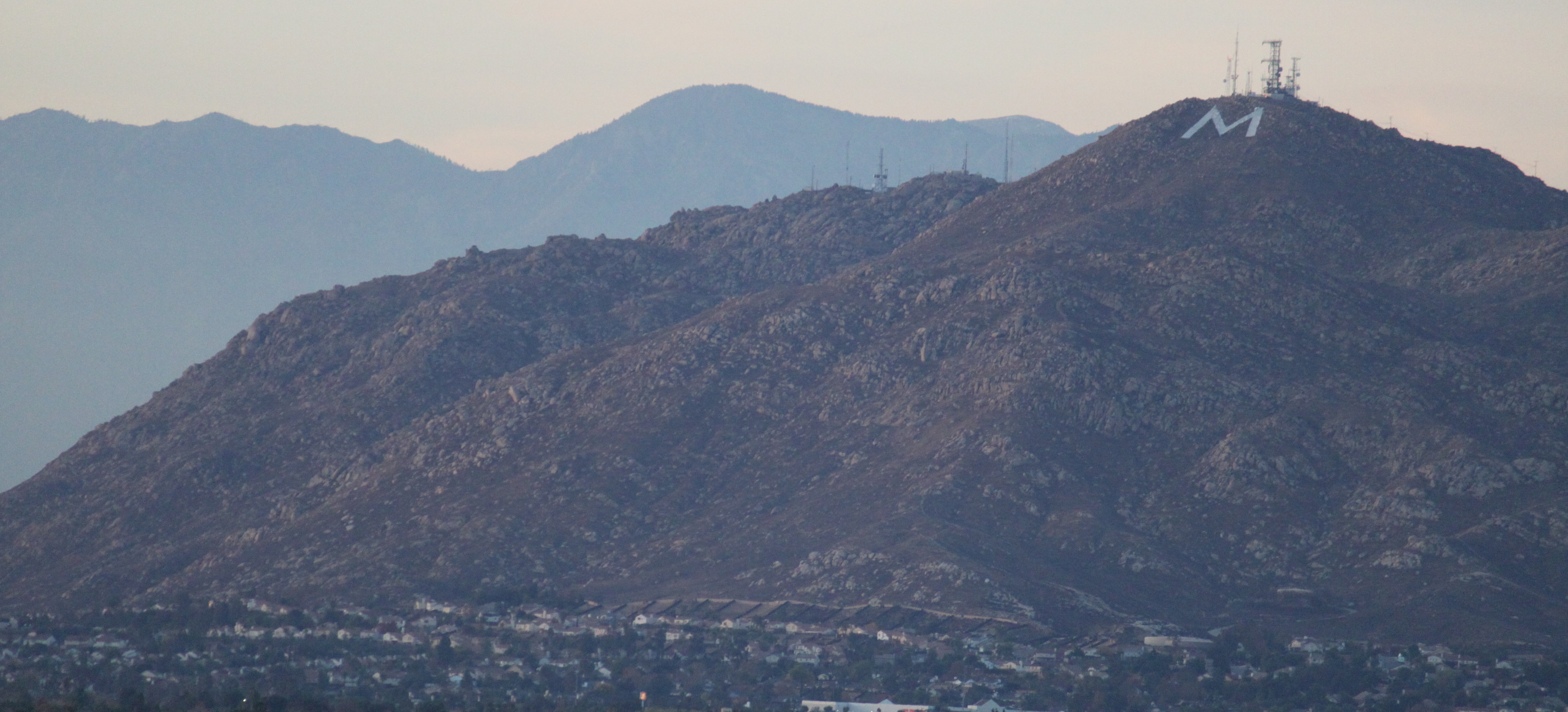
KVCR-TV moved its transmitter to Box Springs Mountain in 1983, greatly increasing its coverage area.

In 1980, KVCR-TV began planning for a major power increase and transmitter site relocation. This would replace the original facility, which used a transmitter 10 years older than KVCR-TV itself, with a site on higher terrain. Several sites, including Sunset Ridge (used by KHOF-TV), were analyzed, but planning soon focused on Box Springs Mountain near the University of California, Riverside campus. After receiving a $650,000 federal grant in December 1981 and awarding contracts for construction work in September 1982, the new facility came into use on December 5, 1983, adding an expected 1 million viewers to the station's coverage area. With the new coverage area, KVCR also began increasing its on- and off-air fundraising activities, hiring its first development director and campaigning for donations on the air. By 1997, when general manager Thomas Little retired after 20 years running KVCR radio and television, the stations had more than 12,700 paid members.

In the 1980s and 1990s, KVCR produced an array of public affairs series covering the Inland Empire region. These included On Call, Dialogues, Impacto, and Ebony Issues. In 1986, the station debuted the weekly I Remember Television, which presented programs from the first decade of American television history with historical context but later broadened to cover the 1950s and 1960s. The program remained in production for 22 years. Local dining program Table for Two, hosted by food critic Allan Borgen, aired from 1990 to 2007.

=== Digitalization and budget woes ===
After Little's retirement, Lew Warren became the station's general manager. Motivated by complaints from viewers, he had KVCR-TV switch from being a secondary PBS station in the Program Differentiation Plan—airing 25 percent of the network's output after a minimum eight-day delay—to a primary station. This meant that the full PBS lineup aired on KVCR-TV for the first time in its history. It also was a major expense. In 1997, the station paid PBS approximately $224,000; those payments were set to increase to $544,000 in 1998. However, KCET protested that KVCR should be required to pay the full per-household-covered rate for programs, not a discounted rate like PBS often permitted secondary stations in large markets to pay. The PBS directors agreed with KCET and increased the total bill to about $800,000 a year.

While that was under way, KVCR experienced two major transmitter faults in late 2002. A heat wave in the Inland Empire caused a tube in the transmitter to blow on August 31, 2002; the station was off air until September 18. The transmitter then failed again in a rainstorm in early November; it was out for 23 days until a temporary transmitter could be installed and put in service on November 30. The station missed broadcasting PBS programs during this time as well as 20 college telecourses. The temporary equipment was used until a new antenna and digital-capable transmitter were installed in June 2004. KVCR continued to broadcast digitally on channel 26 after the digital television transition on June 12, 2009.

KVCR-TV's carriage of all PBS programming ended in 2003 in response to state-mandated budget cuts. The community college was forced to cut $10 million of its $70 million budget; returning to the Program Differentiation Plan saved the station $600,000. Whereas viewers had once complained that KVCR did not have every PBS show, now they were complaining that it heavily duplicated KCET. One new addition came in November 2003 when KVCR-TV began carrying a newscast produced by the Inland California Television Network (ICTN), a venture of Cal State San Bernardino, the city, and the Los Angeles News Group. ICTN continued to air on the station until it shut down in February 2005.

Another major task for KVCR in the 2000s was relocating the station out of its longtime studio location, North Hall on the Valley College campus. North Hall had been slated for demolition for some time. The relocation had originally been conceived to help allow the station to meet the FCC-mandated technological upgrade to digital broadcasting and specified a site at the former Norton Air Force Base. However, the station faced an unusually large construction cost; because the facility would primarily be for educational use, it would be subject to Field Act requirements. Ultimately, the KVCR stations stayed on the Valley College campus and moved to a new Media & Communications Building in 2011.

=== Expansion to the Desert Cities ===
In September 2003, PSTV Partners, which operated a television translator on channel 55 (cable 16) serving the Palm Springs area, decided to begin broadcasting KVCR instead of KOCE-TV on its translator because its owner, Jonathan Sussman, felt the Orange County station was not sufficiently responsive to the interests of the Coachella Valley and fretted about a possible sale of KOCE. Sussman also owned Raven Productions, a local program producer, and began contributing several Coachella Valley-oriented programs to KVCR's lineup. In 2005, the station moved to channel 9 over-the-air and on cable after Sussman hired lawyers to argue that the noncommercial channel needed a lower position on cable. At that time, it was the only public station with a broadcast transmitter in the area. KVCR renewed its lease for five-year terms in 2008 and 2013.

In 2016, PSTV Partners transferred the license of K09XW-D to KCETLink, the parent organization of KCET. KVCR rebuilt KJHP-LD, a separate translator, in 2020 to continue to provide service in Palm Springs.

=== First Nations Experience ===
In 2010, KVCR received a $6 million donation from the San Manuel Band of Mission Indians to start a television channel airing programming about Native American communities in the United States, with a goal to distribute it nationally. The service, First Nations Experience (FNX), began broadcasting as a subchannel on September 25, 2011. The San Manuel Band donated another $6 million to KVCR in 2015 to support expanding FNX.

=== Incentive auction and possible disaffiliation from PBS ===
The KVCR stations, typically reliant on contributions from the community college district for much of their operating funding, began to see cutbacks in the 2010s. In 2012, the district cut its support from $1.7 million to $900,000 and advised the stations to plan on receiving no funding for the 2013–2014 fiscal year, and rumors swirled that the radio and television stations could become managed by public broadcasters in Los Angeles. The board then gave the stations an extra year of public support.

In 2017, KVCR sold its UHF-band television spectrum for $157 million in the 2016 United States wireless spectrum auction and moved to very high frequency (VHF) channel 5. The cash infusion represented 150 percent of the entire budget of the community college district. It was the 11th-largest incentive auction payment to any station nationwide and the largest for a station in the Los Angeles area. The KVCR stations themselves ultimately received $44 million plus $9 million for its endowment, while $80 million was invested by the district and $20 million was earmarked for its pension fund.

In anticipation of the cash infusion from the auction, 2017 also brought a major rebrand of the KVCR stations as the "Empire Network" along with eight new local shows. The changes were made to provide increased differentiation from the Los Angeles-area PBS stations, provide content for the underserved Inland Empire, and reduce KVCR's reliance on programming from PBS. However, in 2018, multiple shows were canceled as part of a downscaling of the program changes; 35 employees were dismissed as a result. The discontinuation of programming was cited by observers as part of an inconsistent station strategy; the KVCR stations had gone through five general managers between 2012 and 2018, including two hirings in 2017 alone.

Despite the incentive auction windfall, KVCR continued to run annual deficits; by late 2020, trustees projected that the KVCR stations would soon need to draw on the principal of the stations' endowment to cover operating expenses. Trustees authorized a plan that October that would likely have ultimately led to the stations becoming student-run outlets and disaffiliating from NPR and PBS. The interim chancellor of the KVCR stations, José F. Torres, recommended to the trustees in April 2021 that the stations be folded into Valley College's Institute of Media Arts. Community backlash to this proposal was significant enough that trustees contacted Inland Empire representatives in the California state legislature, leading to the passage that July of AB 132, an appropriations bill that allocated $4 million for the continuing operation of the KVCR stations. In 2022, the state of California allocated $15 million in funding that secured the stations' future as public media outlets and also led to the establishment of a student training lab within KVCR.

In December 2022, after the end of her two-year term in the California State Senate and a failed bid for a seat on the San Bernardino County Board of Supervisors, senator Connie Leyva became the new executive director of KVCR radio and television.

== Funding ==
For the year ending June 30, 2022, KVCR-DT had operating revenue of $2.6 million, including $830,000 in viewer contributions. The Corporation for Public Broadcasting provided $617,000 in grants, while the San Bernardino Community College District provided $495,000 in non-cash institutional support. The station had 6,159 members.

== Local programming ==
KVCR's local programs are oriented to the Inland Empire and Desert Cities areas. The station airs a television simulcast of Inland Edition, the flagship public affairs program of KVCR radio, and the annual Redlands Bowl Summer Music Festival. As the originating station for FNX, KVCR also produces the channel's weekly news program, FNX Now, and other specialty programs and documentaries.

== Technical information ==
=== Subchannels ===
KVCR-DT's transmitter is located atop Box Springs Mountain. The station's signal is multiplexed:

Subchannels of KVCR-DT
Subchannel	Res.	Short name	Programming
24.1	720p	KVCR-HD	PBS
24.2	480i	KVCRFNX	First Nations Experience
24.3	480i	KVCR-DC	KVCR Desert Cities
24.4	480i	KVCRCRE	Create
