= James E. Cunningham =

American politician

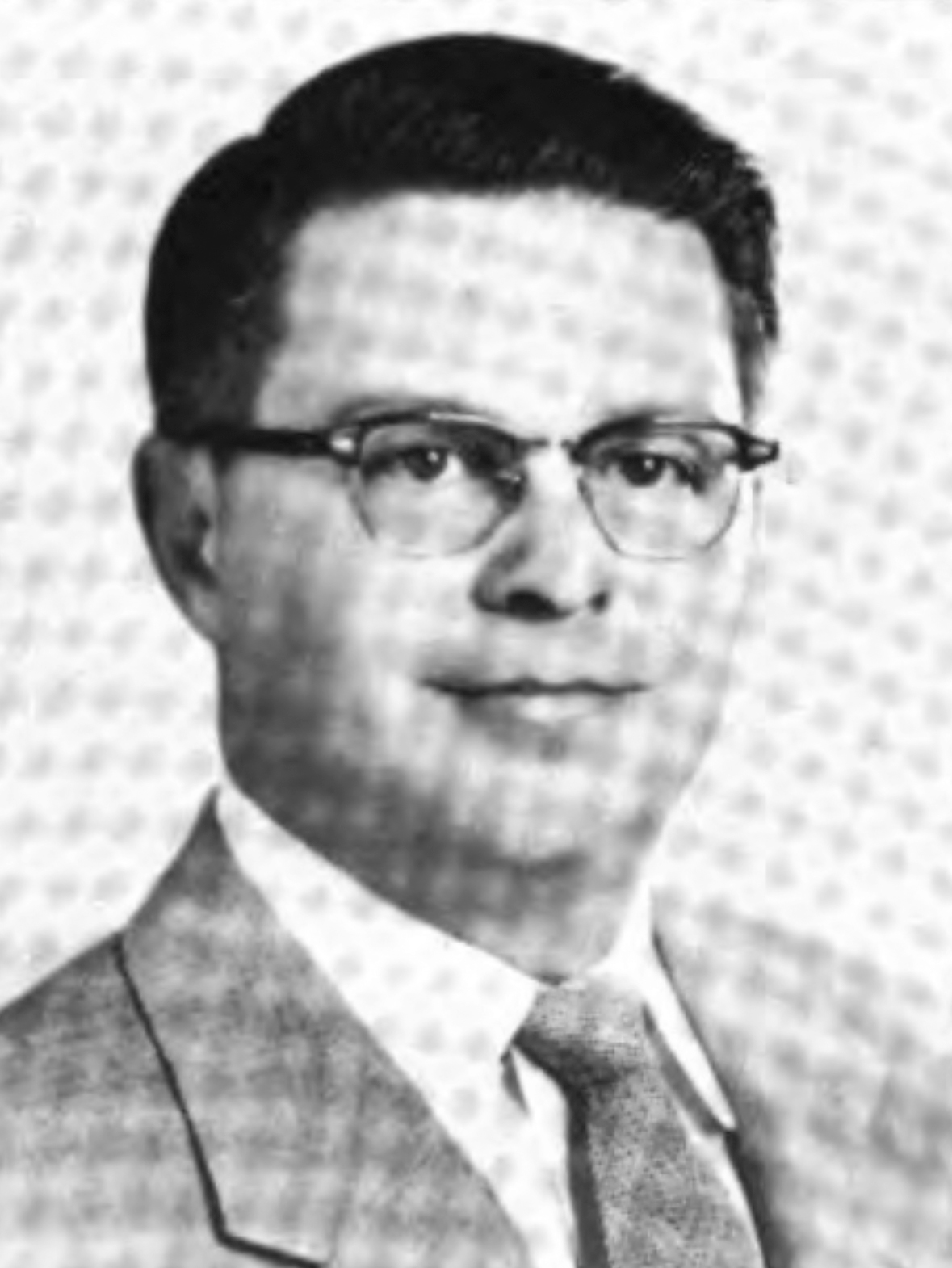

Member of the California Senate from the 36th district
- In office January 8, 1951 – September 10, 1957
- Preceded by: Ralph E. Swing
- Succeeded by: Raymond H. Gregory

19th Mayor of San Bernardino
- In office May 12, 1947 – December 15, 1950
- Preceded by: Will C. Seccombe
- Succeeded by: Clarence T. Johnson

Personal details
- Born: August 28, 1916 Santa Barbara, California, U.S.
- Died: June 6, 1992 (aged 75)
- Party: Republican
- Spouse: Louise Ruth Cunningham
- Children: 6

Military service
- Allegiance: United States
- Branch/service: United States Army; United States Air Force
- Battles/wars: World War II

James E. Cunningham (August 28, 1916 – June 6, 1992) was an American politician who served in the California State Senate for the 36th district from 1951 to 1957 and during World War II he served in the United States Army. He was mayor of San Bernardino and worked as a judge.
