= KVCR (FM) =

Public radio station in San Bernardino

- San Bernardino, California; United States
- Broadcast area: Riverside-San Bernardino-Inland Empire
- Frequency: 91.9 (MHz) (HD Radio)
- Branding: KVCR

Programming
- Format: Public radio
- Affiliations: NPR; Public Radio Exchange; American Public Media

Ownership
- Owner: San Bernardino Community College District

History
- First air date: November 2, 1953
- Call sign meaning: "Valley College Radio"

Technical information
- Licensing authority: FCC
- Class: B
- ERP: 3,800 watts
- HAAT: 494 meters (1,621 ft)
- Transmitter coordinates: 33.9659°N 117.2856°W

Links
- Public license information: Public file; LMS
- Webcast: Listen live
- Website: www.kvcrnews.org

KVCR (91.9 MHz) is an FM non-commercial public radio station located in San Bernardino, California, broadcasting to the Riverside-San Bernardino-Inland Empire area. It is owned by the San Bernardino Community College District, along with channel 24 KVCR-DT. KVCR asks for donations from its listeners, especially during fundraisers, usually held for a week, several times per year.

KVCR's radio format features news/talk syndicated programming from National Public Radio, the Public Radio Exchange and American Public Media, branded as "NPR 91.9". KVCR's studios are located at the Media & Communications Building on the campus of San Bernardino Valley College on South Mt. Vernon Avenue in San Bernardino, and its transmitter is located atop Box Springs Mountain.

== History ==
KVCR first signed on on November 2, 1953. It was the first junior college-owned radio station in southern California. In 1962, it added a public TV station, KVCR-TV 24, which affiliated with PBS.

KVCR became a network affiliate of NPR in the spring of 1970. A year later, KVCR was among the 80 stations in the U.S., five of them in California, to air the first edition of All Things Considered. Prior to July 2005, KVCR was branded as Inland Public Radio airing a mix of news along with classical music syndicated from Classical 24 during midday hours, evenings and weekends. Over time, the classical music programming was dropped as news/talk programming proved to be a bigger draw during fundraisers. KVCR is the primary affiliate for National Public Radio, Public Radio International and American Public Media in the Riverside/San Bernardino market.

Until the 2007 season, KVCR carried most of the games of the Inland Empire 66ers, a minor-league baseball team in the California League. Few NPR stations air minor league baseball.

In March 2013, when Talk of the Nation, which KVCR aired on tape-delay, was cancelled by NPR, KVCR made adjustments to its daytime schedule, adding a second hour of Here and Now at 10 am, and clearing Day to Day for broadcast in the afternoon. Fresh Air was moved to 3 pm, leading into All Things Considered. KVCR's afternoon schedule is now nearly identical to that of KCRW in Santa Monica, the exceptions being local news breaks.

== Programming ==
National programming originating from KVCR includes American Parlor Songbook, hosted by JP Houston. Music show KVCaRts is filmed by sister station First Nations Experience.
