= R. Carey Davis =

American politician

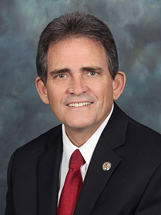
- Official portrait, 2014

33rd Mayor of San Bernardino
- In office March 3, 2014 – December 19, 2018
- Preceded by: Pat Morris
- Succeeded by: John Valdivia

Personal details
- Born: San Bernardino, California, U.S.
- Party: Republican
- Spouse: Johnetta Davis
- Children: 4
- Education: Cal Poly San Luis Obispo (bachelor's degree); California State University, San Bernardino(MBA)
- Profession: CPA

Richard Carey Davis is an American politician who served as the mayor of San Bernardino, California as its 28th mayor. Davis was elected mayor in 2014. He lost the general election on November 6, 2018, after advancing from the primary on June 5, 2018.

== Early life and education ==
Davis was born in San Bernardino and graduated from Pacific High School there. He received his bachelor's degree from Cal Poly San Luis Obispo and his Master of Business Administration from California State University, San Bernardino.

== Career ==
Davis is a certified public accountant, who works as a controller in Los Angeles for Hehr International, a manufacturer of RV doors and windows.

He became involved in city politics in spring 2013. He ran for mayor in a ten-candidate field and in the November 5, 2013, election gained second place, being narrowly edged for first place by 7th Ward city council member Wendy McCammack. Davis and McCammack then proceeded to a February 4, 2014, runoff election, in which Davis defeated Wendy McCammack; turnout was low. He was sworn in on March 3, 2014.

Davis ran for the mayor of Mesa, Arizona in 2024, in which he was defeated in the nonpartisan primary election.
