= Helen Tran (politician) =

American politician

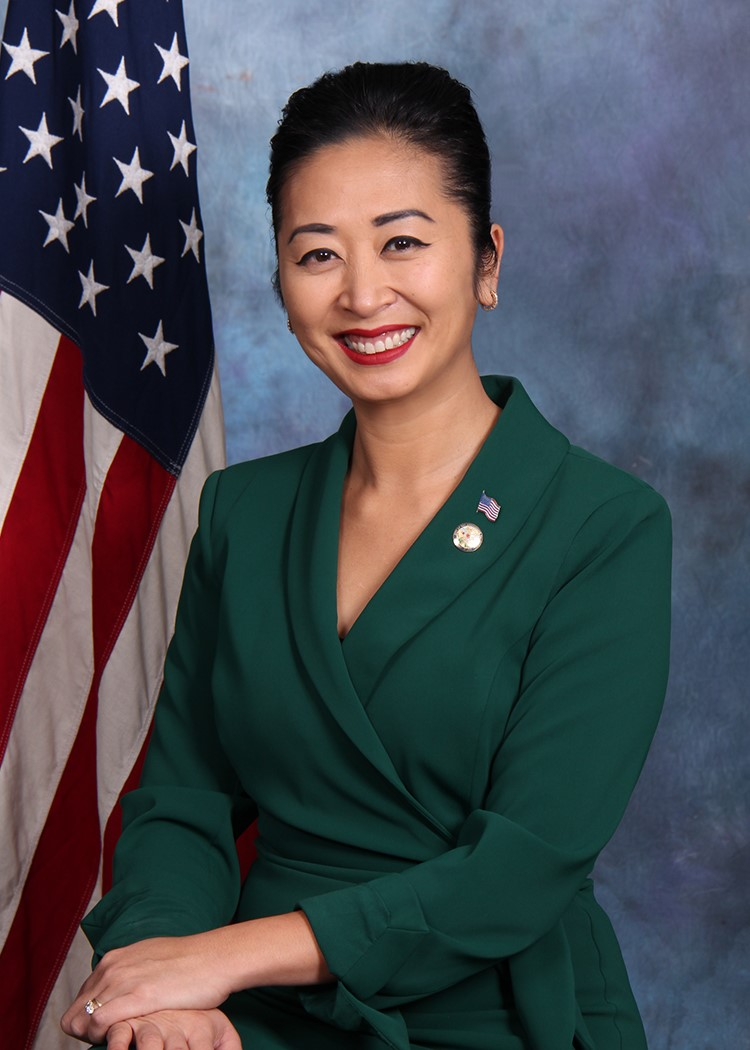
- Official portrait, 2023

35th Mayor of San Bernardino
- Incumbent
- Assumed office December 21, 2022
- Preceded by: John Valdivia

Personal details
- Born: Helen Nguyen; April 16, 1982 (age 44) San Diego, California, U.S.
- Party: Democratic
- Education: University of California, Santa Cruz

Helen Tran (née Nguyen; born April 16, 1982) is an American politician who has served as the mayor of San Bernardino, California, since 2022. She is the city's first Asian American mayor, and the first Vietnamese American woman to be elected mayor of any U.S. city.

== Early life and education ==
Tran was born in San Diego, California to Kim Lam and Victor Nguyen. Her parents had fled Vietnam for Thailand, from where they were relocated to the United States in 1981. At age six, she moved to San Bernardino, where Tran attended Cajon High School. She became the first in her family to earn a college degree when she graduated from University of California, Santa Cruz with a bachelor's degree in American studies in 2004.

== Career ==
Tran worked for the City of San Bernardino for nearly fourteen years within human resources and served as the Director of that department for four years. In 2019 she worked for the City of West Covina as the Director of Human Resources and Risk Management. She has stated that she will resign from this role once her term in office begins.

In a special city council meeting called on February 2, Tran vetoed an amendment to San Bernardino's city charter which would have eliminated her position while setting term limits on the council members. The amendment was passed 4–3, which the charter allowed Tran as the mayor at-large to veto.

== Personal life ==
Tran is married to Kong Tran. The couple have four children.
