= Crafton Hills College =

Community college in Yucaipa, California, US

- Other name: Crafton/CHC
- Type: Public community college
- Established: 1972
- Parent institution: San Bernardino Community College District
- President: Kevin Horan
- Students: 5,019 (2022)
- Location: Yucaipa, California, U.S. 34°2.45′N 117°6.05′W
- Campus: Suburban
- Colors: Green & yellow
- Mascot: Roadrunner
- Website: www.craftonhills.edu

Crafton Hills College (CHC) is a public community college in Yucaipa, California. CHC is part of the California Community College system. It offers associate degrees and career and technical certificates. Since its opening in 1972, more than 200,000 people have attended Crafton Hills and the college now serves approximately 6,500 students each semester with day, evening, and online classes.

== History ==
Crafton Hills College is a public institution in Yucaipa, California. Its campus is located in a rural with a total enrollment of 6,012. On September 11, 1972, Crafton Hills College (CHC) welcomed its first students as the State's newest publicly supported community college. Much of the college is built on Serrano land that Ruben and Lester Finkelstein donated through their foundation The Finkelstein Foundations. The original donation included 167 acres of land in 1966 with 76 more acres in 1970 and finally donating 251 acres of additional land. As the newer of the two colleges in the San Bernardino Community College District (SBCCD), CHC provided added capacity to serve Yucaipa and other east valley communities with high quality two-year college programs for transfer to four-year colleges and certificate programs for those eyeing jobs in certain workforce areas. Since its opening, CHC has enrolled 182,049 students and awarded approximately 16,466 degrees and 13,854 certificates (as of spring 2021). CHC was first accredited by the Accreditation Commission of Community and Junior Colleges (a division of the Western Association of Schools and Colleges) in 1975 and has remained fully accredited ever since. Crafton Hills College (CHC) is one of 114 colleges in the California Community College system, the largest college system of higher education in the world.

The school utilizes a semester-based academic year. The student-faculty ratio is 24-to-1. The school has an open admissions policy and offers credit for life experiences.

The in-state tuition and fees for 2020–2021 were $1,178, and out-of-state tuition and fees were $8,498. There is no application fee.

Students can earn degrees and certificates in 45 different fields. Popular programs include: Biological and Physical Sciences, Social Sciences, General, and Business Administration and Management, General.

== Academics ==
CHC offers majors in the liberal arts and sciences, vocations, and technical studies. Students can receive multidisciplinary degrees, including Fine Arts, Health Sciences, Liberal Studies - Teacher Preparation, and Social Science, and the Fire Science and Emergency Medical Services-Paramedics programs are some of the finest community college programs in the state, with CHC the primary trainer for paramedics in San Bernardino and Riverside counties. CHC also has the distinction of being the top community college in the Inland Empire when it comes to degree/certificate completion rates and course retention/success rates. Crafton Hills College is accredited by the Accrediting Commission for Community and Junior Colleges of the Western Association of Schools and Colleges, an institutional accrediting body recognized by the Council for Higher Education Accreditation and the U.S. Department of Education. In addition, our Basic Firefighter Academy is accredited by CAL FIRE and the Office of the State Fire Marshall (OSFM), the EMT certificate is accredited locally by Inland Counties Emergency Medical Agency (ICEMA), the Paramedic program is accredited by the Commission on Accreditation of Allied Health Education Programs (CAAHEP), the Radiologic Technology program is accredited by the Joint Review Commission on Education in Radiologic Technology (JRCERT), and the Respiratory Care program is accredited by the Commission on Accreditation for Respiratory Care (CoARC).

== Student life ==
Student demographics as of Fall 2023
| Race and ethnicity | Total |
|---|---|
| Hispanic | 54% |
| White | 29% |
| Asian | 6% |
| Multiracial | 5% |
| African American | 4% |
| Filipino | 1% |
| Unknown | 1% |

College clubs change on a yearly basis. Crafton Hills publishes an annual art and literature magazine, The Sand Canyon Review. The College Honors Institute (CHI) provides graduates with priority admission and scholarship consideration at many public and private four-year institutions. Theater arts productions, art exhibits, social activities, interactive workshops, cultural events, and musical performances occur year-round.

== Athletics ==
Crafton Hills College has men's and women's swim teams that began in Spring 2018 and men's and women's water polo teams that began in Fall 2019. Crafton created a men's & women's cross-country team in 2022. The Crafton Hills Aquatics Center features a 50 meter by 25 yards Olympic Swimming Pool kept at 80 degrees year-round. The college hosts an annual California Classic Para Swim Meet.

== Public Safety Training Center ==
Crafton Hills College broke ground on a new Public Safety Training Center, a specialized fire training structure that will be used by the college's Fire Academy and regional partners. The project is made possible by Measure CC, a bond approved by voters in 2018 to fund upgrades in the San Bernardino Community College District. Crafton Hills College started its Fire Academy in 1982, making it the second oldest fire academy in California. The academy enrolls about 30 students per semester, with two academies a year. The Training Center held a grand opening ceremony on January 12, 2024.

== Finkelstein Performing Arts Center ==
Crafton began construction on a new 24,100 sq. ft. Performing Arts Center in May 2023. The new performing space will house instructional spaces for music, theater and dance programming will be ready for students in early 2025.

== See also ==
- Category:Crafton Hills College people
