= Yucaipa, California =

City in California, United States

- City
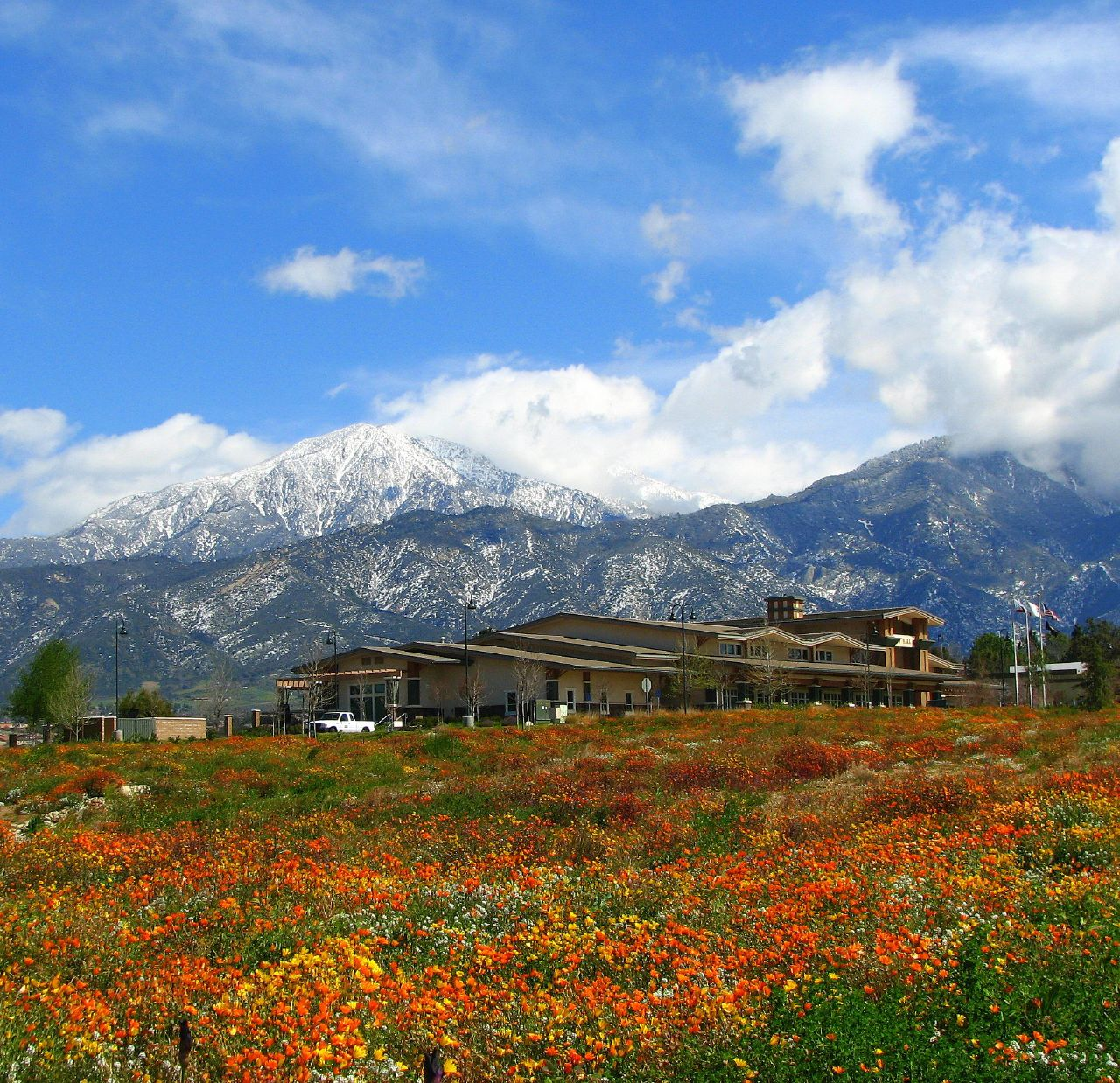
- Yucaipa City Hall, with San Bernardino Peak in the background

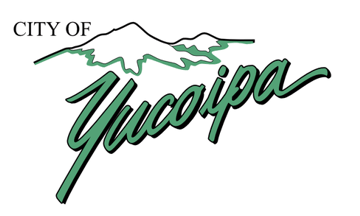
- Flag
- Interactive map of Yucaipa, California
- Location in the United States Yucaipa (California) Yucaipa (the United States)
- Coordinates: 34°02′01″N 117°02′35″W
- Country: United States
- State: California
- County: San Bernardino
- Incorporated: November 27, 1989

Government
  - Type: Council-Manager
  - Mayor: Jon Thorp

Area
  - Total: 28.27 sq mi (73.22 km^{2})
  - Land: 28.27 sq mi (73.22 km^{2})
  - Water: 0 sq mi (0.00 km^{2}) 0.02%
- Elevation: 2,618 ft (798 m)

Population (2020)
  - Total: 54,542
  - Density: 1,929.3/sq mi (744.91/km^{2})
- Time zone: UTC-8 (PST)
  - Summer (DST): UTC-7 (PDT)
- ZIP code: 92399
- Area code: 909
- FIPS code: 06-87042
- GNIS feature ID: 1652818
- Website: yucaipa.gov

Yucaipa (Serrano: Yukaipa't) is a city located 10 miles (16 km) east of San Bernardino, in the Inland Empire region of San Bernardino County, California, United States, on the eastern edge of the Greater Los Angeles area. The population was 54,542 at the 2020 census, up from 51,367 at the 2010 census. Yucaipa has the distinction of being the longtime home to a large population of Serrano Native Americans.

== History ==
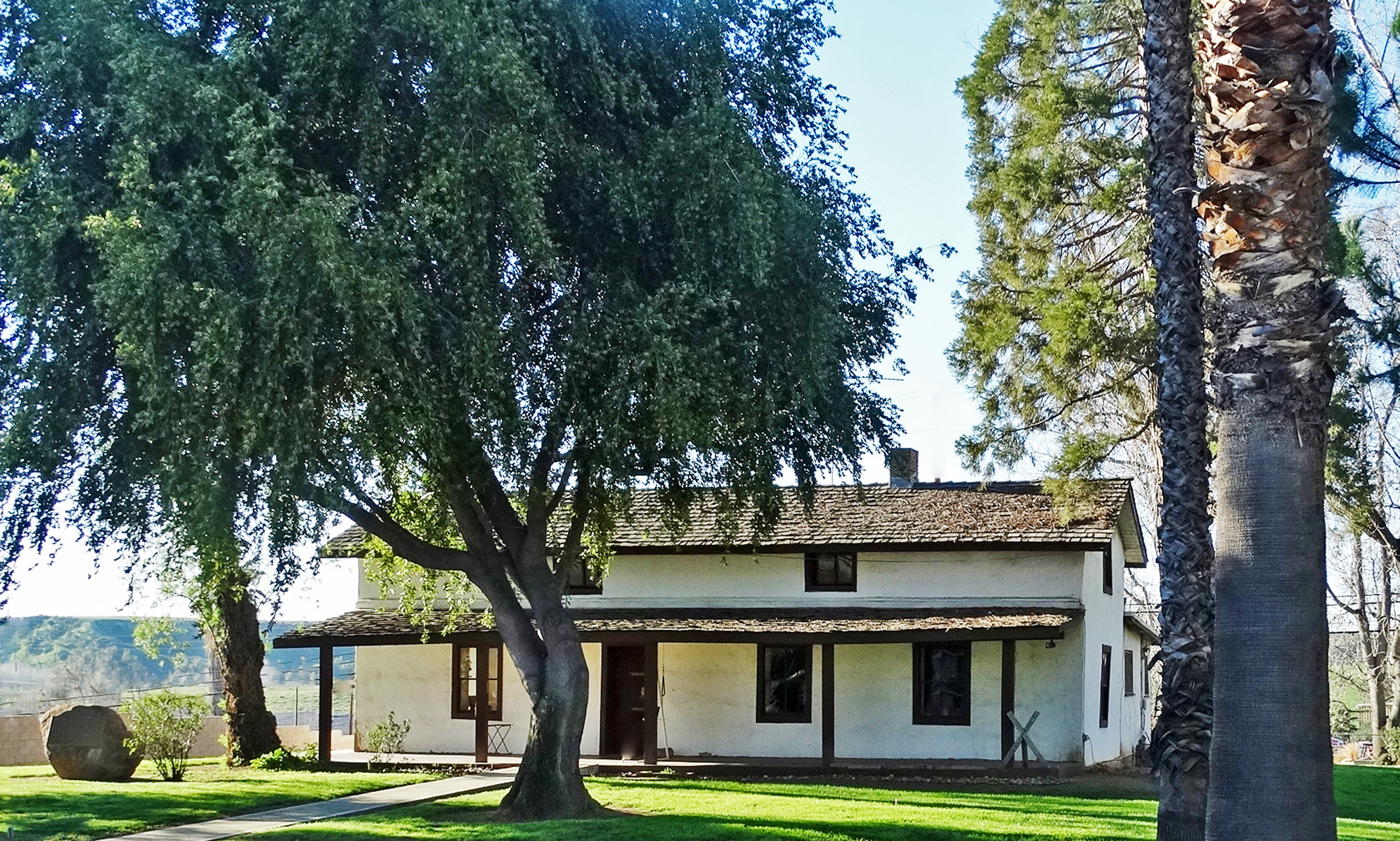
Yucaipa Adobe, built in 1842, by Californio ranchero Diego Sepúlveda, is the oldest building in the city.

Yucaipa Rancheria
- Interactive map of Yucaipa Rancheria
- Location: Yucaipa, California

History
- Built: 1842

California Historical Landmark
- Designated: September 11, 1957
- Reference no.: 620

Prior to the Spanish colonization of the Americas and the arrival of European settlers from Mexico, the Yucaipa Valley was known as Yukaipa't, which meant "green valley" in the Serrano American Language. The land was home to the Serrano Native Americans for thousands of years. Today, some of their descendants are enrolled in the San Manuel Band of Mission Indians.

Two male settlers had "discovered" The City of Yucaipa. The land was untouched. with orange groves, from end to end. Redlands got its name, because its dirt was red.

=== Yucaipa Adobe ===
Yucaipa Adobe
- Interactive map of Yucaipa Adobe
- Location: Yucaipa, California

History
- Built: 1842

California Historical Landmark
- Designated: September 11, 1957
- Reference no.: 528

Near the Rancheria is the Yucaipa Adobe, which is believed to be the oldest house in San Bernardino County. Diego Sepúlveda, nephew of Antonio María Lugo, built the Adobe in 1842 on land that was part of the Rancho San Bernardino granted in 1842 to the Lugos. It had formerly been land controlled by San Gabriel Mission. The Rancho suffered losses of cattle and horses from raids by Native Americans coming through Cajon Pass and Banning Pass from the deserts. Eventually, they sold the Rancho to Mormon settlers in September 1851. The Adobe's later owners included John Brown Sr., James W. Waters, and the Dunlap family; it was acquired by San Bernardino County in 1955. The site is marked by California Historical Landmark #528.

The nearby Oak Glen area is best known for its apple orchards, some of which are operated by the direct descendants of the original founders (the Parrish, Wilshire, Rivers, and Law families). The Parrish Pioneer Ranch and orchard were founded by Enoch Parrish in 1876, with the other families coming into the area later.

=== 21st century ===
At 1:53 p.m. on June 16, 2005, Yucaipa experienced a 4.9 Mw earthquake that was centered four miles (6.4 km) north of the center of town. It had a maximum Mercalli intensity of VI (Strong) and was felt from downtown Los Angeles to some areas of San Diego. Three people were injured.

In 2016, Yucaipa broke ground on a multipurpose performing arts center on the corner of Acacia Avenue and California Street. Sitting on 2.7 acres (11,000 m^{2}) in the heart of uptown, the 16,200 ft^{2} (1,510 m^{2}) venue hosts a variety of events, including community theater, open-air concerts, dance, and other arts-related events. The performing arts center officially opened in Spring 2019.

== Geography ==
Yucaipa is located in southern California, approximately 72 miles (116 km) east of Los Angeles. The city is approximately 2,600 ft (790 m) above sea level and is bordered by Redlands to its west and Calimesa to its south. The unincorporated communities of Cherry Valley, Mentone and Oak Glen collectively account for Yucaipa's northernmost outskirts.

According to the United States Census Bureau, the city has a total area of 28.3 square miles (73 km^{2}), all land.

=== Parks ===
Yucaipa is home to Yucaipa Regional Park, Flag Hill Veterans Memorial Park, Seventh Street Park, "I" Street Park, Wildwood Park, Yucaipa Community Park, the Bryant Glen Sports Complex, the Rick McCowan Regional Soccer Complex, and Wildwood Canyon State Park.

=== Climate ===
According to the Köppen Climate Classification system, Yucaipa has a Mediterranean climate, abbreviated Csa on climate maps.

Climate data for Yucaipa (2,630 feet above sea level)
Month	Jan	Feb	Mar	Apr	May	Jun	Jul	Aug	Sep	Oct	Nov	Dec	Year
Record high °F (°C)	83 (28)	88 (31)	95 (35)	100 (38)	106 (41)	109 (43)	114 (46)	113 (45)	112 (44)	106 (41)	94 (34)	86 (30)	114 (46)
Mean daily maximum °F (°C)	63 (17)	65 (18)	69 (21)	74 (23)	81 (27)	89 (32)	96 (36)	97 (36)	92 (33)	81 (27)	71 (22)	63 (17)	78 (26)
Daily mean °F (°C)	52.0 (11.1)	53.0 (11.7)	55.5 (13.1)	59.5 (15.3)	65.5 (18.6)	71.5 (21.9)	78.0 (25.6)	79.0 (26.1)	74.5 (23.6)	65.5 (18.6)	57.5 (14.2)	51.5 (10.8)	63.6 (17.6)
Mean daily minimum °F (°C)	41 (5)	41 (5)	42 (6)	45 (7)	50 (10)	54 (12)	60 (16)	61 (16)	57 (14)	50 (10)	44 (7)	40 (4)	49 (9)
Record low °F (°C)	11 (−12)	19 (−7)	21 (−6)	25 (−4)	31 (−1)	35 (2)	42 (6)	38 (3)	37 (3)	29 (−2)	20 (−7)	20 (−7)	11 (−12)
Average precipitation inches (mm)	3.91 (99)	4.45 (113)	3.09 (78)	1.19 (30)	0.65 (17)	0.17 (4.3)	0.35 (8.9)	0.26 (6.6)	0.49 (12)	1.03 (26)	1.57 (40)	2.33 (59)	19.49 (493.8)
Source: Weather Channel

== Demographics ==
Historical population
Census	Pop.	Note	%±
1970	19,284		—
1980	23,345		21.1%
1990	32,824		40.6%
2000	41,207		25.5%
2010	51,367		24.7%
2020	54,542		6.2%
U.S. Decennial Census

=== Racial and ethnic composition ===
Yucaipa city, California – Racial and ethnic composition Note: the US Census treats Hispanic/Latino as an ethnic category. This table excludes Latinos from the racial categories and assigns them to a separate category. Hispanics/Latinos may be of any race.
Race / Ethnicity (NH = Non-Hispanic)	Pop 2000	Pop 2010	Pop 2020	% 2000	% 2010	% 2020
White alone (NH)	31,626	33,866	30,589	76.75%	65.93%	56.08%
Black or African American alone (NH)	353	736	743	0.86%	1.43%	1.36%
Native American or Alaska Native alone (NH)	277	242	257	0.67%	0.47%	0.47%
Asian alone (NH)	455	1,358	1,525	1.10%	2.64%	2.80%
Native Hawaiian or Pacific Islander alone (NH)	35	62	81	0.08%	0.12%	0.15%
Other race alone (NH)	61	86	305	0.15%	0.17%	0.56%
Mixed race or Multiracial (NH)	839	1,074	2,258	2.04%	2.09%	4.14%
Hispanic or Latino (any race)	7,561	13,943	18,784	18.35%	27.14%	34.44%
Total	41,207	51,367	54,542	100.00%	100.00%	100.00%

=== 2020 census ===
As of the 2020 census, Yucaipa had a population of 54,542 and a population density of 1,929.4 inhabitants per square mile (744.9/km^{2}). The median age was 39.6 years. The age distribution was 23.6% under the age of 18, 8.0% aged 18 to 24, 25.0% aged 25 to 44, 26.3% aged 45 to 64, and 17.2% who were 65 years of age or older. For every 100 females there were 94.9 males, and for every 100 females age 18 and over there were 92.9 males age 18 and over.

The census reported that 99.2% of the population lived in households, 0.3% lived in non-institutionalized group quarters, and 0.5% were institutionalized. 96.2% of residents lived in urban areas, while 3.8% lived in rural areas.

There were 19,479 households, of which 34.1% had children under the age of 18 living in them. Of all households, 51.8% were married-couple households, 6.2% were cohabiting-couple households, 15.9% were households with a male householder and no spouse or partner present, and 26.1% were households with a female householder and no spouse or partner present. About 23.0% of all households were made up of individuals, and 11.9% had someone living alone who was 65 years of age or older. The average household size was 2.78. There were 13,944 families (71.6% of all households).

There were 20,190 housing units at an average density of 714.2 units per square mile (275.8 units/km^{2}), of which 19,479 (96.5%) were occupied. Of occupied units, 72.7% were owner-occupied and 27.3% were occupied by renters. Of all housing units, 3.5% were vacant. The homeowner vacancy rate was 1.0% and the rental vacancy rate was 4.2%.

Racial composition as of the 2020 census
Race	Number	Percent
White	34,970	64.1%
Black or African American	828	1.5%
American Indian and Alaska Native	829	1.5%
Asian	1,600	2.9%
Native Hawaiian and Other Pacific Islander	93	0.2%
Some other race	8,346	15.3%
Two or more races	7,876	14.4%

=== 2023 estimates ===
In 2023, the US Census Bureau estimated that 10.5% of the population were foreign-born. Of all people aged 5 or older, 77.2% spoke only English at home, 18.8% spoke Spanish, 2.3% spoke other Indo-European languages, 1.6% spoke Asian or Pacific Islander languages, and 0.0% spoke other languages. Of those aged 25 or older, 89.2% were high school graduates and 26.2% had a bachelor's degree.

The median household income was $92,401, and the per capita income was $38,468. About 7.0% of families and 8.9% of the population were below the poverty line.

== Government ==
In the California State Legislature, Yucaipa is in the 19th senatorial district, represented by Republican Rosilicie Ochoa Bogh, and in the 47th Assembly district, represented by Republican Greg Wallis.

In the California's 23rd congressional district, represented by Republican Jay Obernolte.

From November 1999, Richard (Dick) D. Riddell was the longest-serving mayor (and the oldest, at age 88) in Yucaipa's history. In November 2012, at the request of newly sworn councilman Bobby Duncan, Denise Hoyt was named the new Mayor. As of 2025, Yucaipa's City Council was composed of Mayor Jon Thorp, Mayor Pro Tem Chris Venable, Councilmember Bob Miller, Councilmember Judy Woolsey and Councilmember Justin Beaver.

== Education ==
The Yucaipa-Calimesa Joint Unified School District serves both cities, with the following schools:

- Elementary (K–5): Dunlap, Chapman Heights, Calimesa, Ridgeview, Valley, Wildwood, Inland Leaders Charter School, Competitive Edge Charter Academy
- Middle school (6–8): Park View Middle School, Mesa View Middle School (in Calimesa), Competitive Edge Charter Academy, Inland Leaders Charter School
- High school: Yucaipa High School (9–12), Green Valley High School (10–12)

The city is also home to Crafton Hills College, operated by the San Bernardino Community College District.

== Public safety ==
The San Bernardino County Sheriff's Department serves Yucaipa—including the nearby unincorporated towns of Mentone, Oak Glen, Forest Falls, Angelus Oaks, and Mountain Home Village—from its regional station at 34282 Yucaipa Boulevard (a larger replacement opened on July 1, 2014, next to City Hall at 34144 Yucaipa Boulevard). Since there is no official jail facility at this station, suspects are booked at either Central Jail in downtown San Bernardino or the West Valley Detention Center in Rancho Cucamonga.

Yucaipa has contracted operation of its fire department to the California Department of Forestry and Fire Protection (now known as "Cal Fire") which serves the city from three stations: the 33000 block of Yucaipa Boulevard, Bryant Street (in the "North Bench" area), and the southwest corner of Fifth Street and Wildwood Canyon Road. Cal-Fire also provides paramedic level emergency medical service while patient transport by ground is handled by American Medical Response.

== California Historical Landmark ==
Marker at the site reads:

- NO. 620 YUCAIPA RANCHERIA - Yucaipa Valley supported a large population of Serrano Indians. The fertile valley was watered by springs and creeks. The Indians called this area 'Yucaipat' which meant 'wet lands.' These Native Americans lived at this village site most of the year, with occasional excursions to the mountains to gather acorns and other food items during the harvesting season.

Marker at the site reads:

- NO. 528 YUCAIPA ADOBE - Constructed in 1842 by Diego Sepúlveda, nephew of Antonio María Lugo, this is believed to be the oldest house in San Bernardino County. The land, formerly controlled by San Gabriel Mission, was part of the Rancho San Bernardino granted to the Lugos in 1842. The adobe's later owners included John Brown Sr., James W. Waters, and the Dunlap family, it was acquired by San Bernardino County in 1955.

== Notable people ==
- Susan Anton - Miss California 1969, singer and actress
- Matt Carson - professional baseball player
- Tyler Chatwood - professional baseball player for the Toronto Blue Jays
- Matt Davidson - professional baseball player
- Noble Johnson - actor
- May Montoya Jones - writer, lecturer
- Corky Miller - professional baseball player
- Lois Rodden - astrologer, author of Data News
- Mark Teahen - professional baseball player
- Taijuan Walker - professional baseball player

== See also ==
- California Historical Landmarks in San Bernardino County, California
- History of San Bernardino, California
