= John Valdivia =

American politician (born 1975)

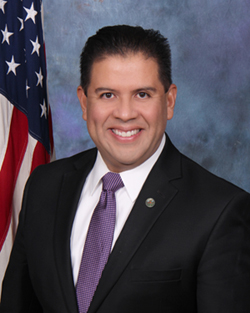
- Official portrait, 2020

34th Mayor of San Bernardino
- In office December 19, 2018 – December 21, 2022
- Preceded by: R. Carey Davis
- Succeeded by: Helen Tran

San Bernardino Mayor Pro Tem
- In office 2016–2017

San Bernardino City Councilman from the 3rd Ward
- In office March 2012 – December 2018

Personal details
- Born: July 19, 1975 (age 51) San Bernardino, California, U.S.
- Party: Republican
- Spouse: Bethany Valdivia
- Children: 2
- Education: Evangel University; Fuller Theological Seminary; Azusa Pacific

John Valdivia (born July 19, 1975) is an American politician who served as the 34th mayor of San Bernardino, California. Valdivia was unsuccessful in his bid for re-election in the 2022 San Bernardino mayoral election. In 2021, Valdivia became the first elected official in 20 years to be censured by the San Bernardino City Council for alleged misuse of public funds.

== Early life and education ==
John Valdivia was born on July 19, 1975, in San Bernardino, California. He received his bachelor's degree from Evangel University. His graduate studies include a Masters of Divinity from Fuller Theological Seminary and a Master of Business Administration from Azusa Pacific University.

== San Bernardino Councilman ==
From March 2012 to December 2018, Valdivia served as the Councilman for the Third Ward in San Bernardino. The ward includes the Auto Center, the Inland Center Mall, Hospitality Lane business corridor, the restaurant row, and the entertainment corridor.

In November 2011, Valdivia was elected with nearly 70% of the total vote, he was sworn into office March 2012.

In February 2014, Valdivia announced his candidacy for California's 31st Congressional District with the Republican Party. Valdivia dropped out of the race one month later citing timing issues and a desire to work on city issues.

Transient Occupancy Tax during his tenure increased from $2.2 million in 2012 to almost $5 million in 2018 by the end of Valdivia's term as Councilman. The transient occupancy tax pays for San Bernardino's police officers and firefighters.

Voters in his third ward district elected him for another term in November 2015.

== Mayor of San Bernardino ==
=== Election ===
On July 6, 2017, Valdivia announced his intention to run in the 2018 election for Mayor of San Bernardino against the incumbent R. Carey Davis. In the June 5, 2018 primary election Valdivia finished first place with 36 percent (35.8%) of the vote; Davis was the runner up with 28 percent (27.8%). As no candidate received a majority of the primary votes to be elected outright Valdivia and Davis advanced to a November 6 runoff election. In the election held on November 6, 2018, Valdivia received 19,155 votes (52.5%) to Davis's 17,327 (47.5%). Valdivia was sworn in as mayor on December 19, 2018.

=== Priorities ===
Valdivia's four main objectives as mayor were "pro-growth, pro-development, pro-safety, and pro-business". Mayor Valdivia objectives were met with mixed and ironic results. Prior to taking office, former Mayor Valdivia was at a shuttered Illegal Marijuana operation for a meet and greet with a criminal defendant (Hanshing Li) on November 14, 2018 just prior to a robbery and shooting at said operation.

Valdivia was a supporter of community-focused policing, in March 2019 the Mayor and City Council voted to reorganize the police department into a five-district policing structure, paving the way toward reopening police substations in the future.

=== Boards ===
John Valdivia was the President of the San Bernardino International Airport Authority (SBIAA); he was originally appointed on February 27, 2019, Valdivia's economic development efforts did not hold up to what he claimed while in office, as California Attorney General found that the Airport Gateway Specific Plan championed by Valdivia and SBIAA and IVDA agency colleagues would displace 2,600 residents in a majority-Hispanic community

== Scandals ==
In February 2020, former city employees filed complaints against the City of San Bernardino claiming that Mayor John Valdivia had subjected them to a hostile work environment and would direct sexual comments and innuendos toward them. Valdivia rejected the claims and said they were "politically driven."

In March 2020, a field representative for the city filed a complaint stating that Valdivia had instructed his chief of staff to falsify performance evaluation forms, giving negative reviews to the two former employees that filed sexual harassment claims against Valdivia in February. On March 12, 2020, Assemblymember Eloise Reyes called on Valdivia to take a leave of absence until the claims were proven to be true, and, if they were proven, to "resign immediately."

In April 2020, a fourth complaint was filed by another former employee, also claiming Valdivia created hostile environments and accusing him of sexual harassment. Valdivia was accused of insisting that he and the employee develop a personal relationship outside of work or he would fire her if she refused. This was the third sexual harassment claim filed by a former city employee.

Also in April 2020, Valdivia requested $50,000 from the City of San Bernardino to go toward the legal fees incurred from the claims against him. At the April 15, 2020 Regular Meeting of the Mayor and City Council, the City Council voted 4–3 in favor of tabling the decision to fund legal representation to Valdivia. Council Members Theodore Sanchez (Ward 1), Fred Shorett (Ward 4), Henry Nickel (Ward 5), and Jim Mulvihill (Ward 7) voted in favor of tabling. Council Members Sandra Ibarra (Ward 2), Juan Figueroa (Ward 3), and Bessine Littlefield-Richard (Ward 6) voted against tabling.

Additionally, the City of San Bernardino has paid $50,000 since February to an independent investigator over the claims brought forward against Valdivia. In May, the investigator requested an additional $30,000 to continue the investigation.

On December 2, 2021, San Bernardino City Council voted to censure Valdivia after an investigation commissioned by the Council found that Valdivia misused public funds for a private promotional event. The investigation also concluded that between September 2019 and April 2021, Valdivia requested reimbursement from the city for travel and hotel costs that overlapped with large financial contributions to Valdivia's reelection campaign. City Council has suggested that it will consider additional penalties for Valdivia, including possible criminal charges and removal from regional boards.

== Personal life ==
Valdivia resides in San Bernardino with his wife, Bethany, and their two children.

== Electoral history ==
=== City Council ===
2011 San Bernardino City Council Ward 3 election
Candidate	Votes	%
John Valdivia	826	69.24
Tobin Brinker	367	30.76
Total votes	1,193	100

2015 San Bernardino City Council Ward 3 election
Candidate	Votes	%
John Valdivia	719	100
Total votes	719	100

=== Mayor ===
2018 San Bernardino mayoral election
Candidate	First round		Runoff	
Candidate	Votes	%	Votes	%
John Valdivia	6,747	35.75	19,155	52.51
R. Carey Davis (incumbent)	5,243	27.78	17,327	47.49
Danny Tillman	2,964	15.71		
Rick Avila	1,414	7.49		
Georgeann "Gigi" Hanna	1,324	7.02		
Karmel Roe	732	3.88		
Danny Malmuth	448	2.37		
Total	18,872	100	36,482	100
