= Judith Valles =

American politician (1933–2026)

Judith Valles (December 1933 – 21 June 2026) was an American educator and former politician. She was the first Hispanic mayor of San Bernardino.

The daughter of Gonzalo and Jovita Valles, both Mexican immigrants, she was born in San Bernardino and was educated at San Bernardino High School and at San Bernardino Valley College (SBVC). She taught elementary school and high school while earning a BA in English from the University of Redlands. Valles went on to earn a master's degree in Spanish literature from the University of California, Riverside and to do doctoral work at the University of California, Los Angeles. She later completed a doctorate in Education at the University of Redlands.

In 1965, she became a member of the faculty at SBVC, where she taught Spanish until 1984. At SBVC, Valles was:

- head of the department of foreign languages from 1972 to 1976
- chair of the division of humanities from 1976 to 1981
- dean of Extended Day and Summer Session from 1981 to 1983
- administrative dean of academic affairs from 1983 to 1987
- executive vice president of academic and student affairs from 1987 to 1988

She was named to the SBVC Alumni Hall of Fame in 1991.

In 1988, she became president of Golden West College, becoming the first Latina president of a California college or university, and was chief executive until 1993. She has also been a trustee for San Bernardino Community College District. She was also host and producer for a Spanish-language television show for KVCR-TV.

She was elected mayor of San Bernardino in 1998 and reelected in 2002. After completing her second term as mayor, she was president of Los Angeles Mission College for three years. In 2012, she became a member of the San Bernardino Municipal Water Department Board of Commissioners.

In 1989, she received the Citizen of Achievement Award from the League of Women Voters and, in 1990, was named Outstanding Women of Orange County Award by the YWCA. In 2003, she was awarded the Ohtli Medal by the government of Mexico.

In 2015, she published a book As My Mother Would Say: Como Decia Mi Mama about life lessons that she received from her mother.

Valles died on 21 June 2026, at the age of 92.
