= San Bernardino Community College District =

Public community college system in California, United States

- Motto: 'Enhancing your life with quality education'
- Type: Community College district
- Established: 1926; 100 years ago
- Affiliations: California Community Colleges System
- Chancellor: Diana Z. Rodriguez
- Students: 18,000
- Location: San Bernardino, California, United States; 34.0666°N 117.2737°W
- Campus: Urban
- Website: www.sbccd.edu

The San Bernardino Community College District (SBCCD) is a public community college system in Crafton Hills College and San Bernardino Valley College in southern California. It part of the California Community Colleges System.

Since 1926, SBCCD has served residents of Big Bear, Bloomington, Calimesa, Colton, California, Grand Terrace, Highland, Lake Arrowhead, Loma Linda, Redlands, Rialto, San Bernardino and Yucaipa. SBCCD also educates and informs residents of all ages through Empire KVCR (FM), the NPR and PBS affiliate station for Inland Southern California on 91.9 FM and TV channel 24.

== History ==
The San Bernardino Community College District (SBCCD) was formed in 1926, originally as the San Bernardino Valley Union Junior College District and the first union district formed in the state.

== The Free College Promise ==
On March 8, 2019, San Bernardino Community College District announced that it would offer two years of tuition-free education to 1,000 high school graduates from its service area, starting with the class of 2019. The Free College Promise would be offered at San Bernardino Valley College and Crafton Hills College, and include free textbooks, personalized student support services, and priority registration to help students earn an associate degree, transfer to a UC or Cal State, or earn a career training certificate in two years.

== Crafton Hills College ==
Crafton Hills College is a community college located in Yucaipa, California. Dr. Kevin Horan is the president of the campus since 2019.

== San Bernardino Valley College ==
San Bernardino Valley College is a community college in San Bernardino, California. It is accredited by the Western Association of Schools and Colleges. The two-year college has an enrollment of approximately 12,000 students and covers 82 acres.
