= Pat Morris (politician) =

American mayor (born 1938)

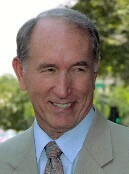
- Morris in 2013

32nd Mayor of San Bernardino
- In office March 7, 2006 – March 3, 2014
- Preceded by: Judith Valles
- Succeeded by: R. Carey Davis

Personal details
- Born: Patrick Joseph Morris; 1938 (age 87–88) Needles, California, US
- Party: Democratic
- Spouse: Sally W. Morris
- Children: 2
- Education: University of Redlands (B.A.); Stanford University (J.D.)
- Profession: Judge; Politician

Patrick Joseph Morris (born January 1938) is an American politician. He was the Mayor of San Bernardino, California from 2006 to 2014, and is a member of the Democratic Party.

== Early life ==
Morris was born and grew up in Needles, California, along the Colorado River, where his father worked for the railroad. He graduated cum laude, Phi Beta Kappa, and was a member of Kappa Sigma Sigma at the University of Redlands. He received his J.D. degree from Stanford Law School and was admitted to the State Bar of California on June 5, 1963.

== Career ==
He served in the Army Reserve for three years. For three years he served as a San Bernardino County Deputy District Attorney. He left the District Attorney's Office to enter private practice law, primarily family law. During his time in private practice, Morris served on the San Bernardino City Unified School District's Board of Education. He helped found the San Bernardino Boys and Girls Club.

=== Judge ===
California Governor Jerry Brown appointed Morris to the San Bernardino County Superior Court in 1976. For three years, he served as San Bernardino County's first full-time Family Law Supervising Judge and organized the court's first Family Law Department. From 1981 to 1984, he served as the Superior Court Presiding Judge. During this time, Morris was named Inland Southern California's Trial Judge of the Year for his outstanding contributions to the administration of justice.

For the next five years, Morris served as Presiding Judge of the Juvenile Court. As Presiding Judge, he established the San Bernardino County Children's Network - a comprehensive interagency networking system to coordinate and enhance services to high-risk children. In July 1991, the National Council of Juvenile and Family Court Judges awarded Morris its highest award for Meritorious Service to the Juvenile Courts of America.

In 1990, Morris returned to the criminal courts and soon thereafter he established one of California's first drug treatment court programs. Since then, Morris has advocated statewide, nationwide, and internationally for treatment alternatives for non-violent addicts in the criminal justice system. Morris has twice been invited to the White House to discuss the issue of Drug Courts, and he has presented the Drug Court program to international conferences at the United Nations, and in Ireland, England and Italy. Following the model of the Drug Courts, in 1999, Morris established one of the nation's first Mental health courts to treat the seriously mentally ill caught in the criminal justice system.

=== Mayor ===
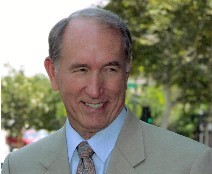
Mayor Pat Morris in 2006

In 2005, he took leave from the San Bernardino Superior Court to run for mayor of San Bernardino. He won the initial election in November 2005, but not by the required majority. On February 7, 2006, Morris won the mayoral run-off election against City Attorney James "Jim" Frank Penman by 64% of the vote. Morris was sworn in on March 7, 2006 as mayor. He appointed his son, Jim Morris, to be his chief of staff. The position is unpaid because San Bernardino's Charter prohibits nepotism.

He was reelected in 2009.

In July 2012, with a city budget deficit of at least $45 million and headed towards Chapter 9 bankruptcy after a city council vote, Major Pat Morris stated, "It is a dark day for the city."
