= List of mayors of San Bernardino, California =

Mayor of the City of San Bernardino
- Seal of the City of San Bernardino

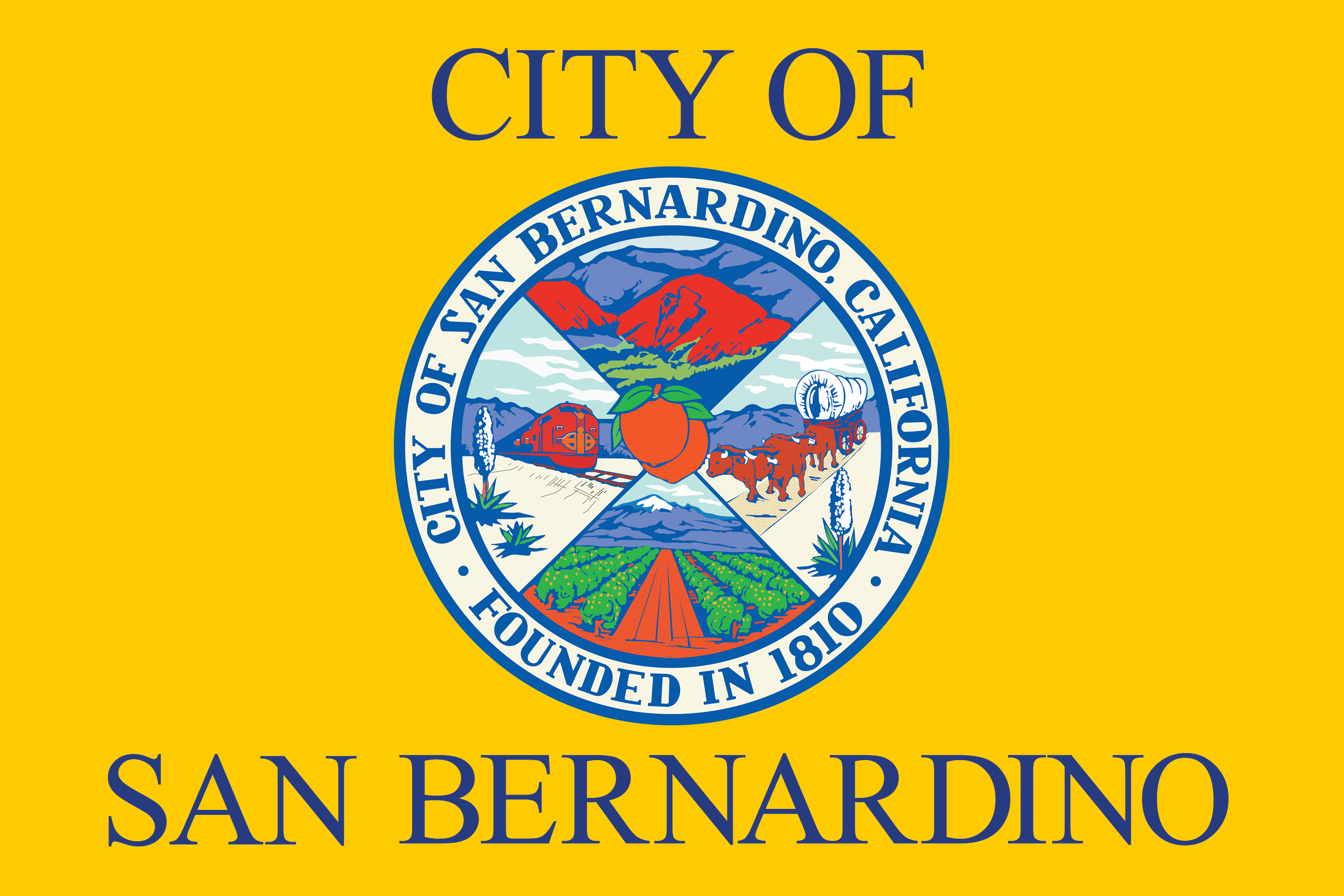
- Flag of the City of San Bernardino

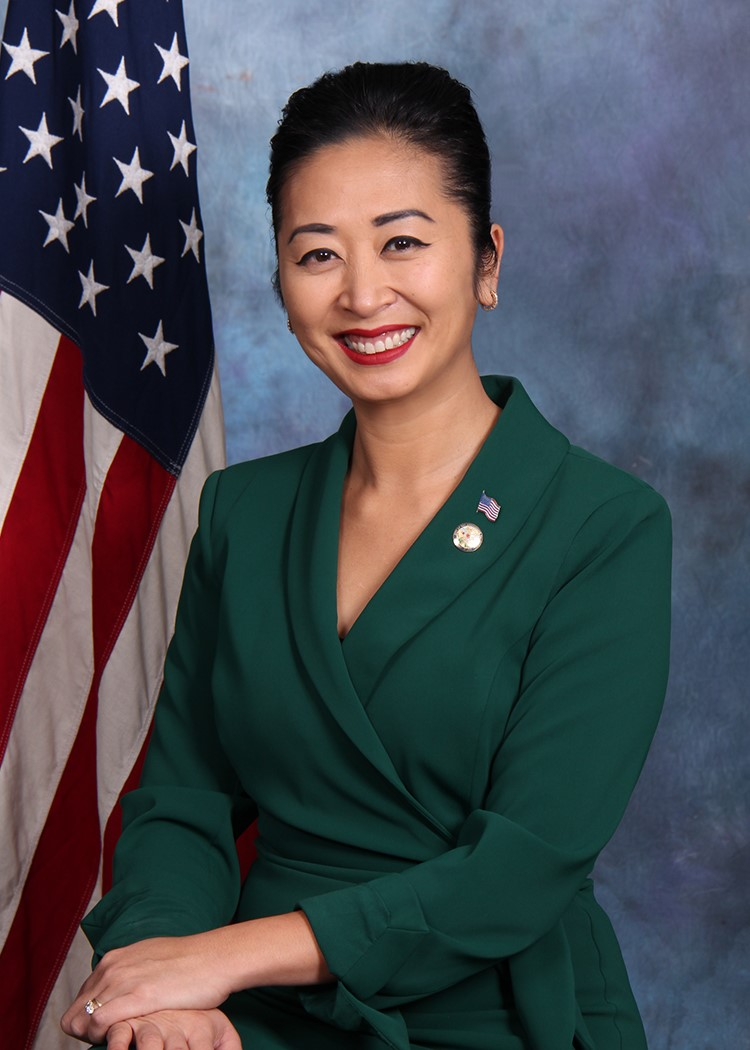
- Incumbent; Helen Tran since December 21, 2022
- Formation: 1854
- First holder: Amasa M. Lyman

This is a list of mayors of San Bernardino.

== List ==
List of mayors
Image	Mayor	Begin term	End term
	Amasa M. Lyman	1854	1854
	Charles C. Rich	1855	1855
	Hiram Merritt Barton	May 8, 1905	June 24, 1907
	John J. "Pop" Hanford	June 24, 1907	May 10, 1909
	Samuel W. McNabb	May 10, 1909	May 8, 1911
	Joseph S. Bright	May 8, 1911	May 12, 1913
	Joseph W. Catick	May 12, 1913	May 10, 1915
	George H. Wixom	May 10, 1915	May 12, 1919
	John A. Henderson	May 12, 1919	May 9, 1921
	Samuel W. McNabb	May 9, 1921	February 9, 1925
	Grant Holcomb	February 9, 1925	May 9, 1927
	Ira N. Gilbert	May 9, 1927	May 13, 1929
	John C. Ralphs Jr.	May 13, 1929	May 11, 1931
	Ira N. Gilbert	May 11, 1931	May 8, 1933
	Ormond W. Seccombe	May 8, 1933	May 3, 1935
	Clarence T. Johnson	May 13, 1935	May 8, 1939
	Henry C. McAllister	May 8, 1939	May 12, 1941
	Will C. Seccombe	May 12, 1941	May 12, 1947
	James E. Cunningham	May 12, 1947	December 15, 1950
	Clarence T. Johnson	December 16, 1950	May 14, 1951
	George C. Blair	May 14, 1951	May 9, 1955
	Raymond H. Gregory	May 9, 1955	December 31, 1957
	Elwood D. "Mike" Kremer	December 31, 1957	May 11, 1959
	Raymond H. Gregory	May 11, 1959	May 8, 1961
	Donald G. "Bud" Mauldin	May 8, 1961	May 10, 1965
	Al C. Ballard	May 10, 1965	May 10, 1971
	W. R. "Bob" Holcomb	May 10, 1971	June 2, 1985
	Evlyn Wilcox	June 3, 1985	June 5, 1989
	W. R. "Bob" Holcomb	June 5, 1989	June 7, 1993
	Tom Minor	June 7, 1993	March 2, 1998
	Judith Valles	March 2, 1998	March 6, 2006
	Patrick J. Morris	March 6, 2006	March 3, 2014
	R. Carey Davis	March 3, 2014	December 19, 2018
	John Valdivia	December 19, 2018	December 21, 2022
	Helen Tran	December 21, 2022	Incumbent
