= Fatima's Grill =

Lebanese–Mexican fusion restaurant in Los Angeles

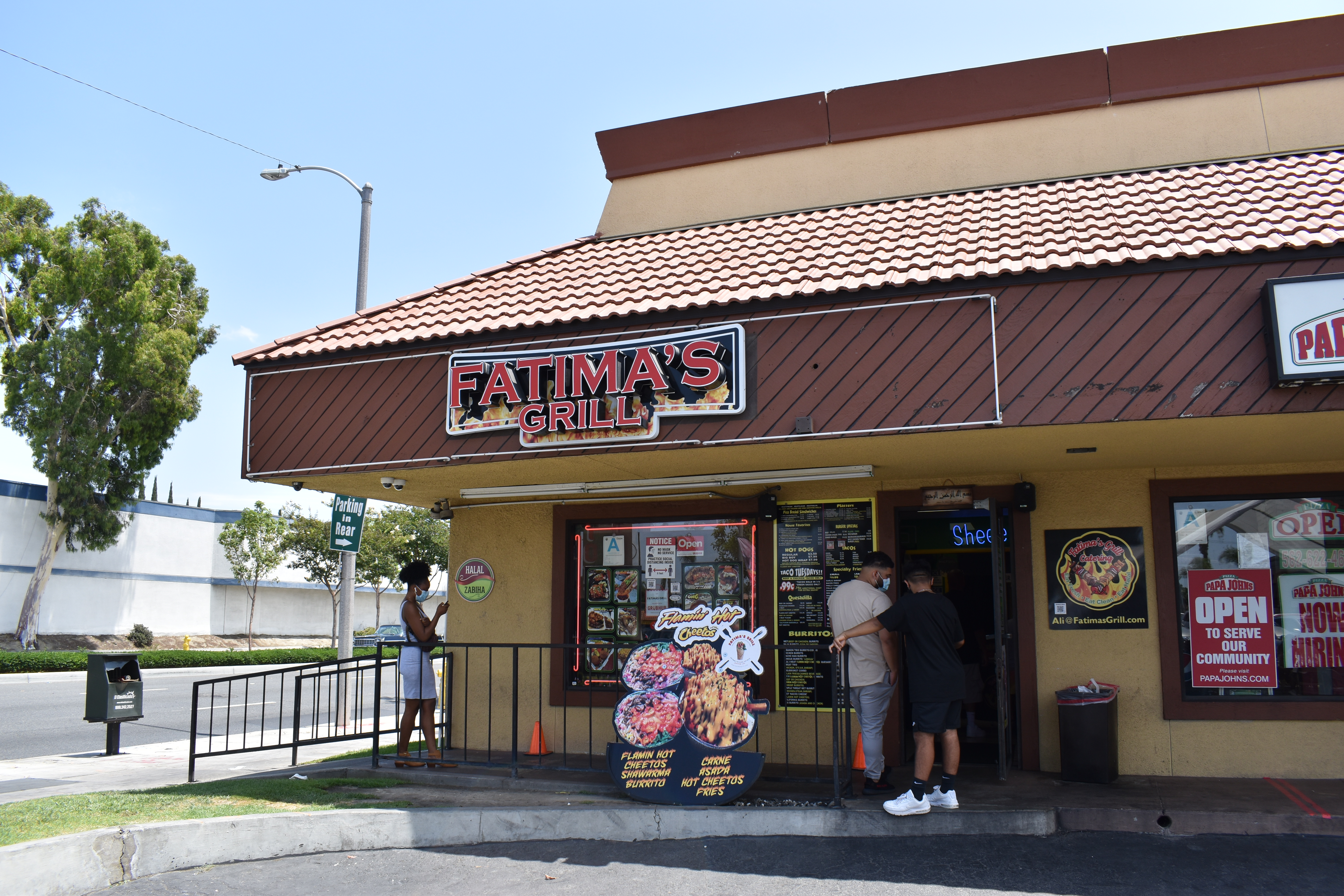
- Interactive map of Fatima's Grill

Restaurant information
- Established: 2016
- Owner: Ali Elreda
- Food type: Fusion (Lebanese–Mexican)
- Dress code: Casual
- Location: 7840 Firestone Boulevard, Downey, California, 90241, United States
- Coordinates: 33°56′38.5″N 118°8′26.8″W
- Website: www.fatimas-grill.com

Fatima's Grill is a restaurant specializing in Lebanese and Mexican fusion cuisine. First opened as a taco stand in 2016, its main location is presently located at 7840 Firestone Boulevard in Downey, California, part of the Gateway Cities region of Los Angeles County.

== History ==
Fatima's Grill was opened in the summer of 2016 by Ali Elreda, a Lebanese American who grew up in the predominantly-Hispanic neighboring city of Bell. The restaurant is named after his daughter.

Elreda, who previously had no significant cooking experience, conceived of the restaurant and many of his recipes while working in the kitchen at the Federal Correctional Institution, Safford in Arizona, where he was serving a 7.5-year sentence for drug trafficking. After opening the restaurant, Elreda at one point had to return to Safford to list his ingredients, as he sourced many of the items he uses in his dishes from the prison commissary.

In January 2022, Fatima's Grill opened a second location along Gage Avenue in Bell, with basketball players Stephen Jackson and Matt Barnes serving as special guests for the location's opening. Subsequent expansions would lead to the restaurant opening franchised locations in Montebello, Long Beach and Paramount, and in November 2022 it announced that it would open its first location outside of California in Dearborn, Michigan, with additional locations also opening in Brooklyn in New York City as well as in downtown Los Angeles.

== Location and concept ==
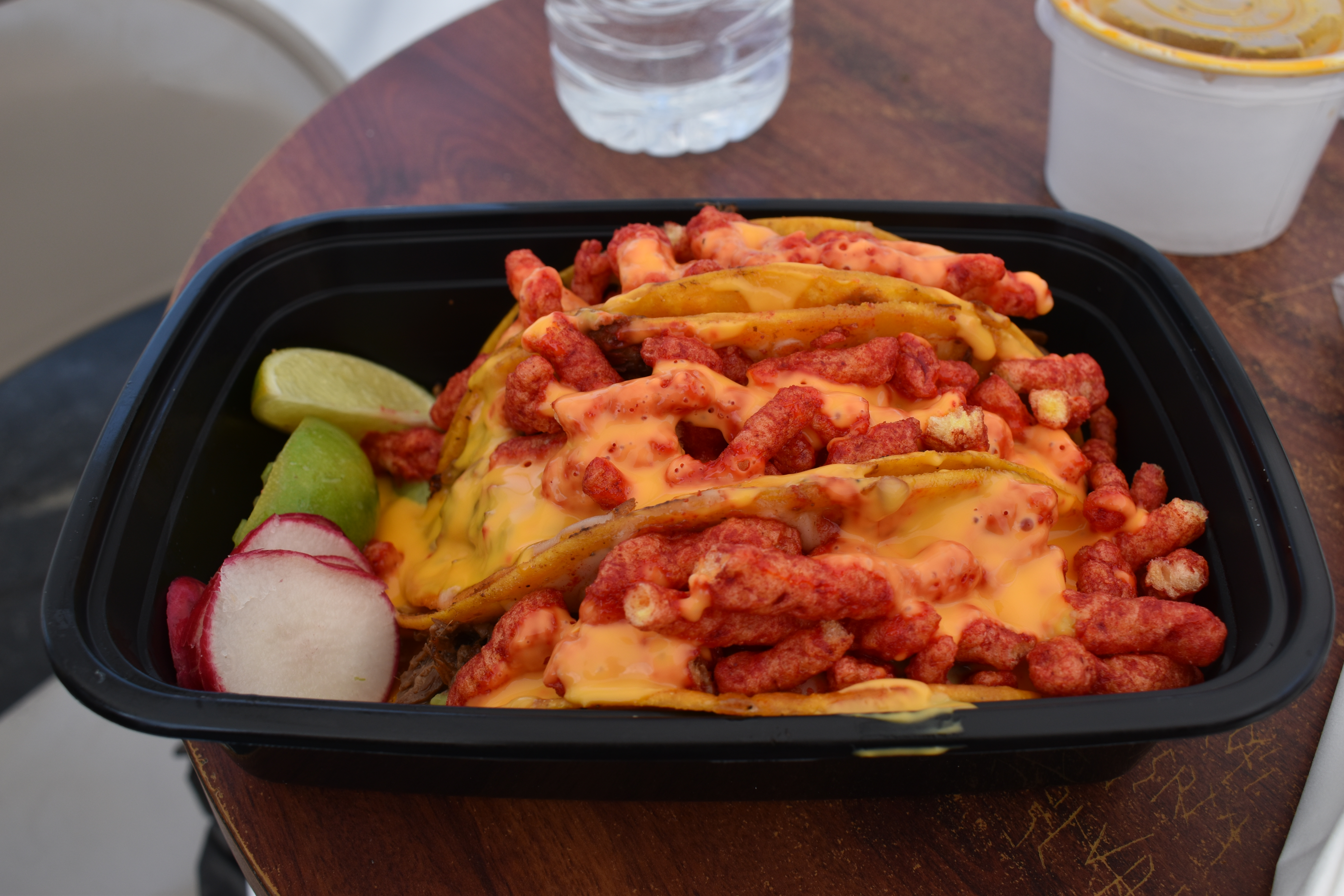
A quesabirria from Fatima's Grill topped with Flamin' Hot Cheetos

Fatima's Grill currently occupies a corner space in a strip mall along Firestone Boulevard, located across from a Stater Bros. supermarket, and down the street from Johnie's Broiler, another notable Downey restaurant. The restaurant serves around two hundred customers daily, with much of its traffic being driven by its Instagram account, which has over 165,000 followers. A number of celebrities have patronized the restaurant as a result of social media, including singer Sean Kingston and basketball player Bryon Russell.

The restaurant's menu is anchored around different variations of burritos, tacos, quesadillas, wraps and French fries, informed by Elreda's experiences in prison and his need to cook with whatever ingredients that were available. Much of the restaurant's success is driven by the visual nature of its social media presence, with diners taking pictures of their orders in a way that helps them go viral, in turn driving further traffic. Many dishes feature Flamin' Hot Cheetos as a signature ingredient, which was introduced to the menu at the suggestion of Elreda's daughter in September 2017, and are now considered to be some of the menu's most popular offerings. All meat served by the restaurant is halal.

Due to the COVID-19 pandemic in California, Fatima's Grill closed its dining room and transitioned to a takeout-only operation, with staff members covering for one another particularly when their family members contracted the disease. In the summer of 2020, a viral TikTok video led a crowd of hundreds of people to congregate at the restaurant, which led to hours-long waits for food. The incident led to Elreda nearly closing the restaurant entirely, though ultimately it was decided instead to very strictly enforce pandemic restrictions.

== See also ==
- Spread (prison food)
