= Mario Ybarra, Jr. =

American artist

Mario Ybarra Jr.
- Born: 1972 (age 53–54); Wilmington, California
- Education: MFA, University of California, Irvine; BFA, Otis College of Art and Design

Mario Ybarra, Jr. (born 1972, Wilmington, California) is a Southern California artist working with site-specific installations, murals, and community-based initiatives. He cofounded the arts collective Slanguage with performance artist Karla Dias in the early 2000s.

== Education and early life ==
Mario Ybarra, Jr. graduated with an MFA from University of California, Irvine, in 2001, where he studied under Daniel Joseph Martinez, and acquired a BFA from Otis College of Art and Design, Los Angeles (1999). He grew up in the neighborhood of Wilmington, a port area in Los Angeles, where his parents were dockworkers.

== Work ==
He worked as studio assistant for Rubén Ortiz-Torres after graduating from UC, Irvine. He has actively created socially-engaged artworks since. His installations and community-based projects are informed by street iconography and graffiti art, popular culture, and collective movements as well as his Mexican American identity. Ybarra has been involved with arts education, grassroots organizing, and arts administration through an artist-run gallery in Los Angeles, California. He is a founding member of the artists' collective Slanguage.

=== Exhibitions (selection) ===
Ybarra, Jr.'s works were featured in significant art exhibitions such as Made in L.A., the Los Angeles Biennial (2012), and the Hammer Museum; the 2008 Whitney Biennial, New York; and Phantom Sightings: Art After the Chicano Movement at the Los Angeles County Museum of Art (2008). Mario Ybarra, Jr.'s work is included in the collection of the Pérez Art Museum Miami, Florida.

The Huntington Library in collaboration with the Vincent Price Art Museum at East Los Angeles College, invited artists Carolina Caycedo and Mario Ybarra Jr. to create new artwork inspired the art collection, library archives, and botanical gardens. Ybarra Jr. produced drawings, which were exhibited in the two-person show "Rituals of Labor and Engagement" in 2019.

In 2023, he presented Personal, Small, Medium, Large, Family, and installation commenting on mass incarceration in the United States and immigrant communities, at the University Art Gallery at California State University, Dominguez Hills (CSUDH).

== Awards and recognition ==
Mario Ybarra Jr. was an artist-in-residence at the Pasadena City College; and at the Fabric Workshop and Museum, Philadelphia, between 2011 and 2013. He has been awarded a Levitt Fellowship from Williams College, Massachusetts, in 2008.

In 2023, he was a recipient of a U.S. Latinx Artist Fellowship from the U.S. Latinx Art Forum.
