= Prison food =

Meals served to prisoners

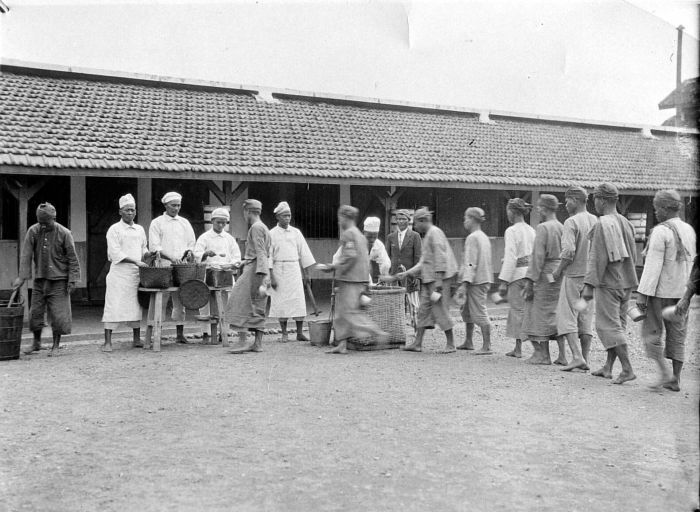
Prisoners lining up for food in the prison of Malang, East Java, some time between 1921 and 1932

Prison food or jail food is the term for meals served to prisoners while incarcerated in correctional institutions. While some correctional institutions prepare their own food, many use staff from on-site commercial food service companies to prepare food. Prisoners will typically receive a set number of standard meals per day from the prison. In some jails and prisons, they can supplement their diets by purchasing additional foods at the commissary with money earned from working in the correctional institution or sent by outsiders.

== Around the world ==
=== North America ===
==== United States ====
There is no nationwide mandate for state and local prisons on the minimum amount of calories or nutrients a meal must contain.

Dietary, religious, and ethical concerns are taken into consideration to a certain extent. As of October 2, 2016, federal prisons offer their inmates a vegan meal option for breakfast, lunch, and dinner. Jewish prisoners may be issued kosher rations.

====== Preparation ======
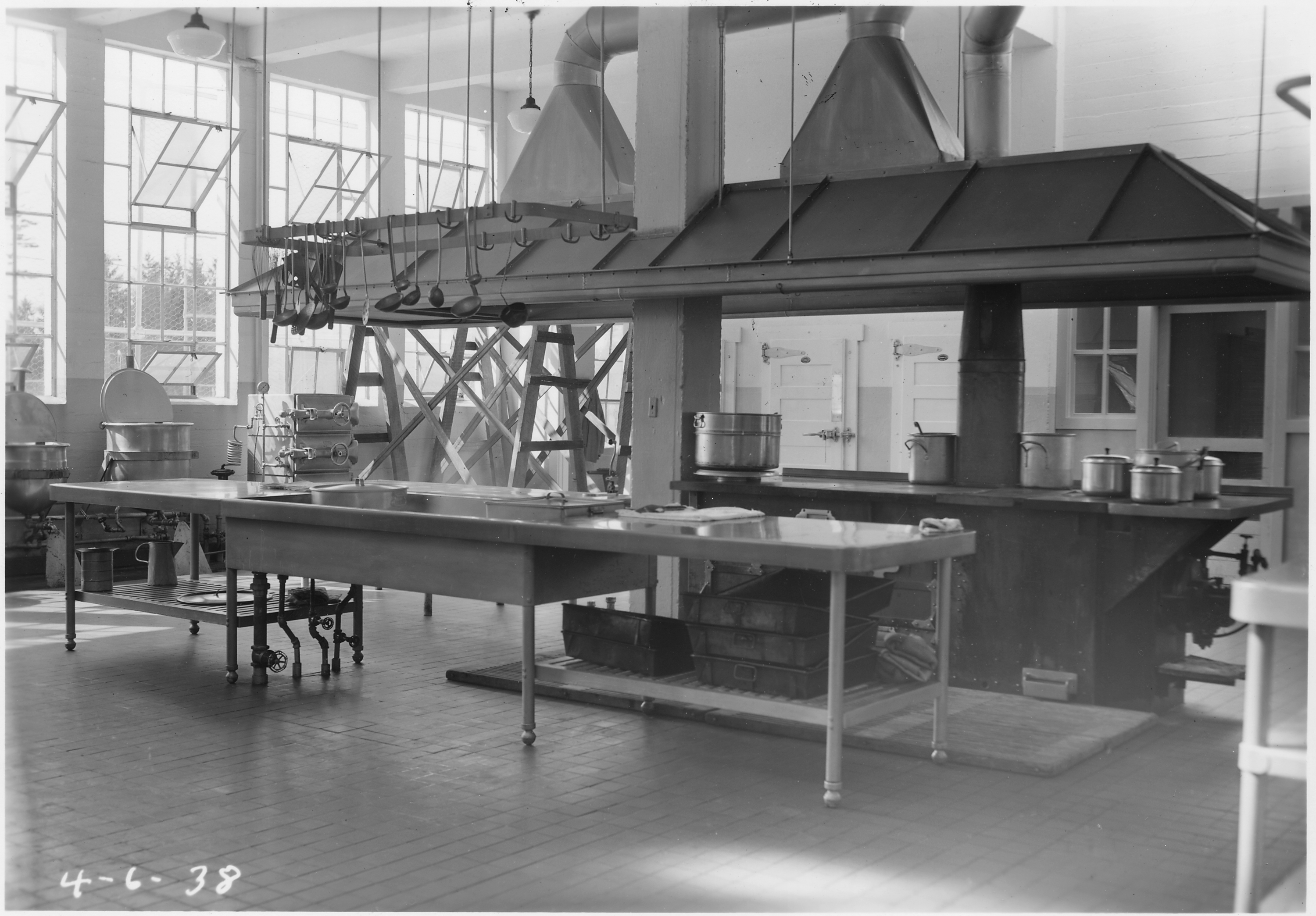
Inmates' kitchen at the farm of the Federal McNeil Island Corrections Center in Puget Sound, April 6, 1938

Often, private civilian contractors are responsible for all aspects of food preparation, including training, adherence to recipes, food safety, theft prevention, and portion control. State prisons often prefer to conduct their own inspections; however, they may opt for accreditation from a nonprofit organization such as the American Correctional Association. Approximately 80% of state departments of corrections are involved with such oversight organizations.

Most prison food in the United States is prepared with the blast-chill method, which allows a large number of meals to be prepared and then reheated at meal times. In the US, this technique was pioneered by the New Jersey correctional system, in January 1982.

Inmates may also purchase food at the prison commissary, such as chocolate bars, beef jerky, honey, peanut butter, bread, ramen noodles, coffee, and snack cakes.

===== Example of meals =====
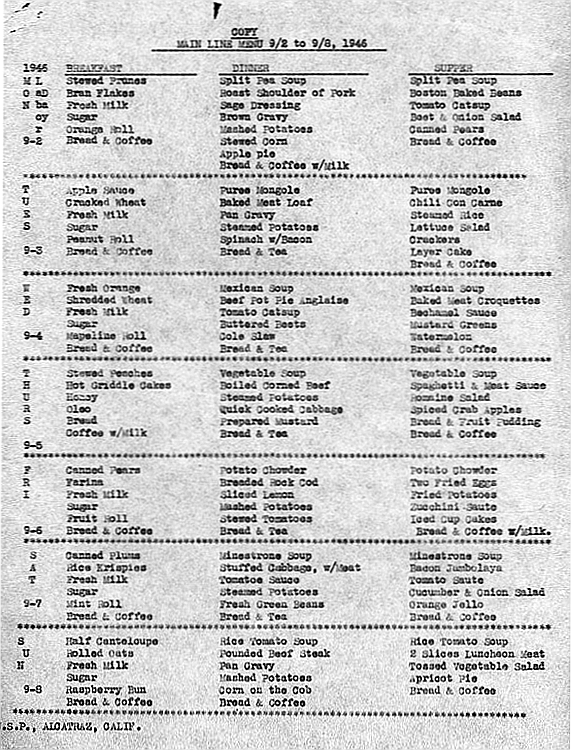
1946 Alcatraz Federal Penitentiary menu

An example of a meal from a state prison is as follows:

- 2–3 oz (57–85 g) of meat or meat by-product
- half a cup of vegetables
- three-quarters of a cup of a starch
- three-quarters of a cup of salad with dressing

In U.S. federal prisons, breakfasts usually consist of a Danish pastry, hot or cold cereal, and milk. The other two meals of the day include foods such as chicken, hamburgers, hot dogs, lasagna, burritos, tacos, and fish patties. Inmates only have access to milk in the mornings, and have access to water and a flavored drink for the other two meals.

Prisoners have been known to create prison "spreads", or privately prepared meals with items purchased from a prison commissary, obtained from government-mandated meals to prisoners, or obtained from a prison kitchen. Spreads can often become communal gatherings of prisoners, with the general expectation that each prisoner contributes one aspect of the meal. Prison spreads are largely a response to inadequate food quality, quantity and/or variety within the meals served by the prison itself.

===== Problems =====
There have been several documented examples of mass foodborne illness within prisons from the food served. There have been hunger strikes from prisoners protesting being served food that makes them ill after eating. Whistleblowers and reporters have documented mouse droppings and various violations of standards in prison kitchens.

It is no longer allowed for family to bring food nor share with loved ones behind bars; rather, families can transfer money for a fee to allow inmates to purchase packaged foods such as prepared noodle packages and candy from the prison store. There is thus usually no way for inmates to ever have access to fresh food.

Hunger is a problem in prisons. 94 percent of formerly incarcerated people surveyed by Impact Justice said they could not eat enough to feel full. A 2025 report by the New Yorker described more than two dozen cases of death by starvation and malnutrition in jails across the country. Aramark, who has provided the meals to many prisons in the U.S. since 2004, has been sharply criticized for lowering standards and not providing sufficient quantities of edible food.

===== Legal standards =====
Although there is a certain amount of self-regulation, most oversight occurs as a result of inmate litigation. Complaints against prison food have been made on the grounds of breach of Constitutional Amendments. In particular, claims of inadequate food may breach the Eighth Amendment banning cruel and unusual punishment, and denial of specific food requirements on religious grounds breach the First Amendment. It was not until 1976, during the Estelle v. Gamble case, that courts began to use the Eighth Amendment for issues involving cruel and unusual punishment against inmates; however, the issues must involve 1.) "Whether the injury was objectively, sufficiently serious," and 2.) "Whether the prison official was deliberately indifferent to the inmate's needs." This can be interpreted by different courts in various ways. For example, one court may see depriving a disobedient inmate of food as "sufficiently serious," therefore going against the Eighth Amendment, while another court may see it as an appropriate measure of punishment, therefore in line with the Eighth Amendment.

Supreme Court cases in 1987, Turner v. Safley and O'Lone v. Estate of Shabazz, created a test that balanced the constitutional rights of prisoners to exercise their religion freely against the rights of the prisons to punish inmates and keep the prison in order. Whether or not a prison has breached an inmate's religious dietary rights is now judged from the cases of Turner and O'Lone. While this test is still in use, many other constitutional points come into play, and it is still a widely debated issue.

=== Europe ===
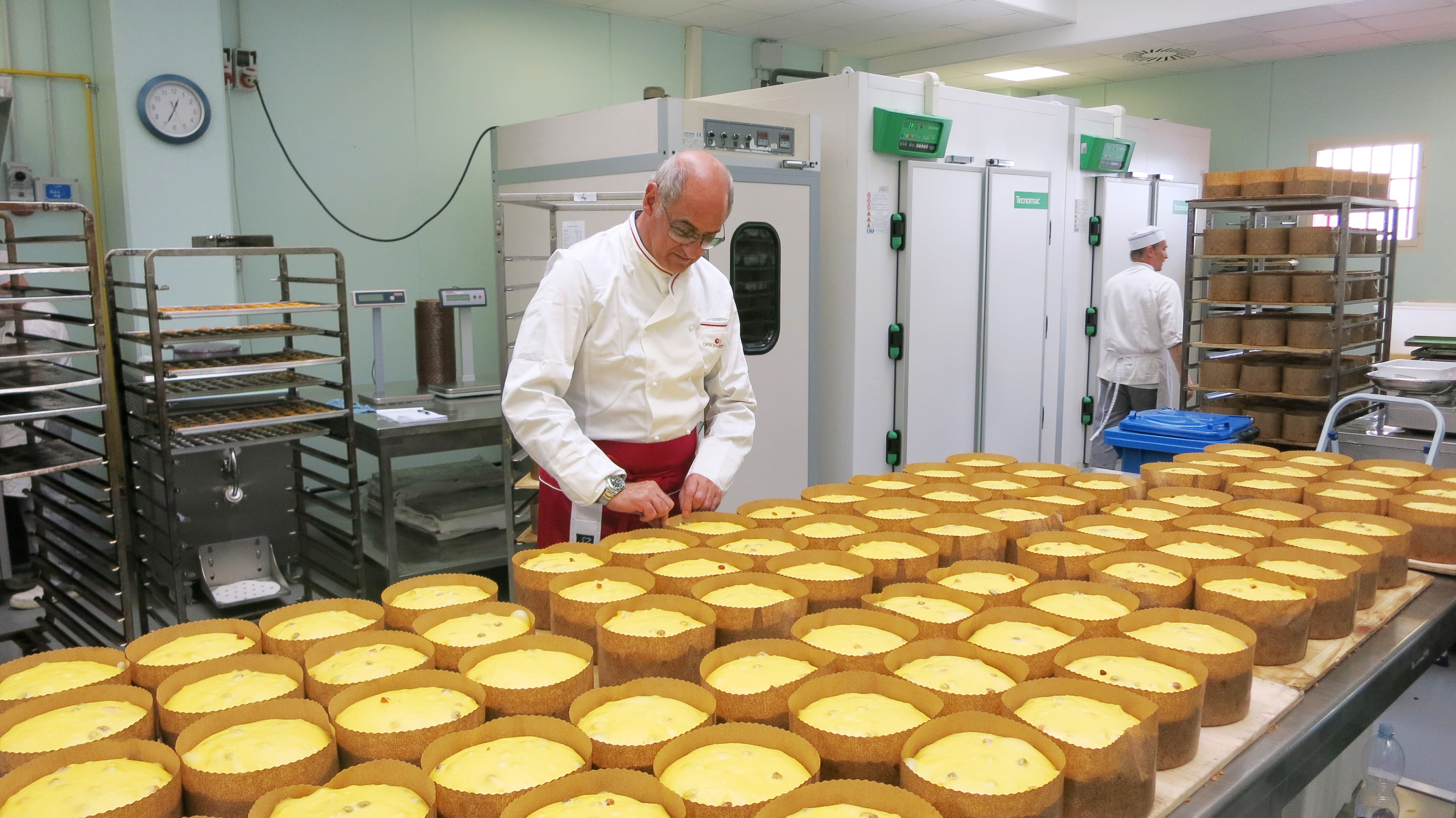
Panettone being prepared in a prison kitchen in Padua, Italy, 2014

==== Poland ====
A prison service officer—a chef—supervises the proper preparation of meals in each unit. He is also the one who supervises the inmates employed in the kitchen. Prisoners are involved at every stage of meal preparation, from peeling vegetables, preparing individual ingredients, cooking and dividing food portions. They are employed in the kitchen on a paid or unpaid basis, and their assignment to particular tasks depends primarily on their education and skills. All meals are carefully selected in terms of nutritional value. Depending on the type of prison, meals are delivered to the cell or, as is the case in semi-open and open prisons, inmates eat them in canteens.

The officer of the quartermaster's department is responsible for determining what is included in the menu and for diversifying the meals. He prepares individual diets with the participation of a health care worker. A convict staying in a prison or pretrial detention facility receives drinks and meals with appropriate nutritional value three times a day, including at least one hot meal. The energy value of meals included in the daily diet of prisoners is not less than 2,800 kcal for prisoners under 18 years of age and 2,600 kcal for other prisoners. The food rations allocated consider the type of work performed and the age of the convict, and, if possible, also religious and cultural requirements.

There are 7 types of meals available in the units:

- meals prepared for prisoners over 18 years of age –"P"
- meals prepared for prisoners under 18 years of age – "M"
- therapeutic meals: easily digestible, diabetic, individually assigned to the inmate
- meals prepared considering religious and cultural requirements
- meals prepared for inmates working in particularly onerous conditions.

Convicts have the opportunity to receive meals that take into account religious or cultural requirements, for example, a dietary standard without pork (so-called "Muslim diet") or vegetarian. Some inmates deliberately declare converting to Islam or Judaism to change their meal plan.

===== Examples of meals =====
Sample daily meal plan for "P" option from a Kraków prison includes:

- Breakfast—tea, bread, margarine, pork knuckle sausage
- Lunch—dill soup with rice, beef goulash, potatoes, cucumber salad, compote
- Dinner—tea, bread, margarine, pressed luncheon meat.

Another sample daily meal from Łódź prison looked as follows:

- Breakfast: wheat bread, "bread fat-spread", homogenized cheese and apples
- Lunch: celery soup with potatoes, chicken wings with vegetables, rice, mixed vegetable salad and apple compote
- Dinner: identical to breakfast, except for replacing the cheese with cottage cheese

==== United Kingdom ====
In jails in the late 1830s prisoners were issued a spoon, a 2 imperial pints (1.1 L) zinc dish for broth, and a 3-gill (3/4 imperial pint (430 ml)) zinc bowl for milk. During winter, when milk was in short supply, prisoners would occasionally be provided with treacle water.

Strict rules governed the quantity of food given to prisoners. For example, a female who was not in condition for work would receive around 1 1/2 imperial pints (850 ml) of broth and 6 ounces (170 g) of bread. A male prisoner who was in condition for work would get 2 imperial pints (1,100 ml) of broth and 12 ounces (340 g) of bread.

Breakfast, served at 7:30 am, would comprise 5 ounces (140 g) ounces of oatmeal porridge with 3/4 imperial pint (430 ml) of milk. Lunch, served at 12:00 pm, consisted of soup and bread. Each pint of soup was required to contain 1 ounce (28 g) of ox head or marrow bones, 1 1/2 ounces (43 g) ounces of barley, 1/2 ounce (14 g) of green peas, 1 1/2 ounces (43 g) ounces of leeks, and various other vegetables. Supper was served at 6:00 pm and consisted of 5 ounces (140 g) ounces of oatmeal porridge and 1/2 imperial pint (280 ml) of milk.

Up until about 2004 (in most prisons), prison meals were prepared by prisoners under the supervision of prison employees. The move towards privatization of meal preparation and rationing resulted in numerous changes from historical practices. In some prisons, such as HMP Norwich, the prison meals are still prepared by prisoners.

===== Current food =====
The average daily allowance per prisoner is £1.87, and can be as low as £1.20. In some cases, particularly in juvenile institutions, allowances can be as high as £3.45 per day.

In 2004-05, the Prison Service spent £94 million on catering, the largest components of which were food (£43 million) and catering staff (£32 million). Significant improvements have been made to the Prison Service’s catering arrangements resulting in financial savings and improved quality of service. Since 2003-04, savings have been made from expenditure on food (up to £2.5 million each year or about six per cent of expenditure on food) and on catering staff (£1.7 million a year or about five per cent of expenditure on staff) – mainly through the civilianisation of catering staff posts. Savings have also arisen from more efficient procurement (up to £1.2 million a year) and reduced stockholdings of food (a one-off saving of some £2 million).

Meals are generally not made from seasonal produce, but instead use convenience foods such as canned goods, frozen vegetables, hamburgers and pies.

===== Examples of meals =====
Examples of menus in a London prison are as follows:

Lunch:

- Vegetarian pasta bake
- Chicken & mushroom pie
- Jamaican beef patty
- Corned beef & pickle roll
- Jacket potato & coleslaw

Dinner:

- Vegetable supreme
- Chicken supreme
- Chicken curry
- Grilled gammon
- Pork pie salad

=== Africa ===
==== Egypt ====
Regular meals served to prisoners are basic. For lunch prisoners are typically served dishes such as cold pieces of boiled meat, eggs, or skinny chicken bones, white rice, and vegetable soup, and dinner consists of foods such as ful medames (a traditional Egyptian dish of fava beans, vegetable oil, and cumin) with stale bread made from mixed flours. Each prison has a canteen where prisoners can buy additional food such as meat, vegetables, and fruits to supplement their diet. Many prisoners also have food brought to them by their families.

==== Ethiopia ====
The standard prison meal in Ethiopia is injera with stew, most often made with beans and usually with no meat. Prisoners are typically fed three times a day with the same meal.

==== Rwanda ====
Prisoners receive two basic meals a day, a breakfast of maize or sorghum porridge and a lunch or dinner of a maize porridge called Ugali and beans. Extra food is available for purchase at the prison canteen or can be brought by visitors.

=== Asia ===
==== Bangladesh ====
Historically, prisoners in Bangladesh were served a breakfast of bread and molasses, a practice that had been in place since the British colonial era in the 18th century. The meal consisted of 116 grams of bread and 14.5 grams of molasses, remaining unchanged for over 200 years.

In 2019, the government introduced a new breakfast menu, replacing the colonial-era offering. The updated menu includes bread, vegetables, sweets, and khichdi (a spiced rice and lentil dish). The change is part of broader prison reforms aimed at improving nutrition and prisoner morale.

==== Saudi Arabia ====
Prisoners in Saudi Arabia are served foods such as bread and sandwiches for breakfast, chicken, mutton, and fish for lunch, and rice and vegetables for dinner. Prisoners also receive rations such as salads, milk, and juice.

==== South Korea ====
Kongbap, a dish consisting of white or brown rice cooked together with grains, peas, and beans, is a common staple in Korean prisons. Prisoners are also served dishes such as bread with tomato sauce, cheese, soup, salad, and soy milk at breakfast and bone marrow and vegetable soup, kimchi, and beansprouts at lunch. Other foods such as fruits and meats are available for purchase at prison commissaries.

==== Vietnam ====
Every prisoner is entitled to 17 kilograms of rice, 15 kilograms of vegetables, 0.7 kilograms of meat, 0.8 kilograms of fish, 0.5 kilograms of sugar, and 1 kilogram of salt per month.

==== Pakistan ====
===== Punjab =====
In Punjab, the prison diet is structured with a weekly menu that includes:

- Breakfast: Roti and tea daily, with variations such as Aaloo Bhujia (potato curry) and Halwa (sweet dish) on specific days.
- Lunch: A mix of vegetables, lentils (like Dal Gram and Dal Mash), and chicken dishes, with special items like sweet rice on certain days.
- Dinner: Often includes chicken, beef, or vegetable dishes served with roti. Special meals are provided during religious festivals like Ramzan, Eid-ul-Fitr, and Eid-ul-Azha, which include additional items like syrup, dates, and special sweets.

===== Sindh =====
In Sindh, the prison menu follows a structured plan:

- Breakfast: Options like Aaloo Bhujia with oily roti, Anda Ghotala (scrambled eggs), and double roti (bread) with margarine.
- Lunch: Typically includes chicken dishes like Chicken Aaloo Qeema (minced chicken with potatoes) and Chicken Haleem, as well as various vegetable curries.
- Dinner: Features dishes like Mix Daal with seasonal vegetables, Karhi Pakora, and Chicken curry with seasonal vegetables. Special desserts like Milk Sawayiyan or Kheer are also served.

==== Taiwan ====
Taiwanese prisons typically serve simple meals. Breakfast in some prisons may include soy milk and rice rolls. Lunch and dinner may include rice, vegetables, fish, and meat. One prison in Taichung serves up to 4 and 1/2 tons of rice to the inmates every day. This amounts to just 500g of rice per prisoner per day plus some vegetables or fish.

=== Oceania ===
==== Australia ====
Prisons in Australia are operated by the correctional systems of the state and territories, with meal regulations varying accordingly. However, as of 2004 all state and territory governments had adopted the Standard Guidelines for Corrections in Australia, which provide that all prisoners should have "continuous access to clean drinking water and with nutritional food adequate for health and wellbeing, at the usual hours prepared in accordance with the relevant health standards".

Food quality was historically poor in Australian gaols and was a frequent source of prisoner discontent. Several riots at Fremantle Prison and the Bathurst riots were attributed in part to instances where prisoners were served contaminated meals. The 1978 report of the Royal Commission into New South Wales Prisons found that food at maximum-security prisons was "at best unpalatable and at worst not fit for human consumption".

==== New Zealand ====
The New Zealand Department of Corrections is required by law to provide three meals per day, one of which must be hot, and meals cannot be more than 14 hours apart. As of February 2020, the average meal cost is $6.03 per prisoner per day.

An example daily prison menu includes the following:

- Breakfast: Cornflakes and milk; two slices of toast with margarine and peanut butter; tea and sugar.
- Lunch: Two mixed grain sandwiches: one roast beef, relish and salad (or tomato, mayo and salad) and one egg, mayonnaise and salad; one serving of fresh fruit
- Dinner: Two chicken sausages (or vegan sausages), two servings of vegetables, potato, onion gravy, one serving of fresh fruit, and milk
- Supper: Muffin

== List of prison foods ==
- Last meal – In the United States, when prisoners are on death row they are entitled to one last meal of their choice, which is served to them two hours before they are executed. Studies show that most of the time death row inmates choose foods that are high in calories and fat such as french fries and hamburgers. In some US states, for example, Texas, last meals were limited to 20 dollars. However, in other states such as Florida and Indiana, last meals are limited to 40 dollars. California allows for up to 50 dollars to be spent on the last meal. Most states require that the last meal be locally available. If the meal exceeds these price limits they will either reduce the portions or make the inmate choose something else. For example, a Texas inmate who asked to be served 24 soft shell tacos was only given 4. It was also found that last meal requests reflected the inmates' nationality.
- Nutraloaf – Nutraloaf is given to prisoners as a punishment. Nutraloaf usually is a blended concoction of previous days' meals. Nutraloaf can be described as very bland and cardboard-like. The morality behind nutraloaf is a widely controversial issue. Many argue that serving nutraloaf to prisoners is unethical and goes against particular rights. Prison staff argue that the use and the threat of nutraloaf reduces violence tremendously. In the Spring of 2012, in Prude v. Clarke, Judge Richard A. Posner ruled that an inmate’s exclusive diet of nutraloaf violated the Eighth Amendment’s prohibition against cruel and unusual punishment.
- Mystery meat – similar to bologna sausage
- Porridge – a former staple in UK prisons
- Kongbap – a Korean grain and legume dish associated with prison food service
- Ričet – a European barley, bean, vegetable and pork stew sometimes associated with prisons
- Gruel
- Prison spreads
- Pruno

== See also ==
- Hardtack, the military ration of hard bread
- Prison commissary, an alternative commercial source of prison food
