= Leland Francis Norton =

Leland Francis Norton (March 12, 1921 in San Bernardino, California – May 27, 1944 in France) was a captain in the US Army Air Forces who died heroically during a bombing mission in World War II in Europe.

== Biography ==
Norton was born March 12, 1921, in San Bernardino, California. His parents were Thomas F Norton and Vernice Katherine Hopkins. Norton attended Elliott Elementary School, Arrowview Junior High School, and San Bernardino High School. Norton then attended San Bernardino Valley College.

In the fall of 1941, Norton dropped out of college and joined the Royal Canadian Air Force. In March 1942, Norton transferred to the US Army Air Force. He was sent first to Maine, and then to Greenland, where he participated in rescue work. He applied for combat, and was trained during the summer of 1943. By 1944, Norton was Deputy Commander of the 640th Bombardment Squadron in the United Kingdom.

On May 27, 1944, while attacking a German marshaling yard on his 16th combat mission, Norton's A-20 Havoc bomber was struck by antiaircraft fire. Norton ordered his crew to bail out of the aircraft, but he stayed at the controls to ensure their safe evacuation. Norton died during the plane crash near Amiens, France. According to one source, Norton did parachute out of the bomber, but was killed by the exploding bombs when the plane crashed.

== Aftermath ==
For his heroic actions, Norton was posthumously awarded the Distinguished Flying Cross (DFC), the highest Army Air Force Award, for "self sacrificing regard for the safety of his crew and fellow men bringing great distinction on himself and the Army Air Forces." Norton was also awarded a Purple Heart

In 1950, San Bernardino Air Force Base was renamed Norton Air Force Base in Norton's honor. His portrait hung in the Officers' Club until the base closure in 1994.

Norton was originally buried outside France in the US Military cemetery, but in 1952 his parents went to France and brought him home. He is buried in Mt View Cemetery in San Bernardino, California / PLOT: Lawn K- 709-213

Stater Bros., a supermarket company in Southern California, presents the Leland F. Norton award each year to a local resident in honor of Norton.

In 2011, the San Bernardino City United School District broke ground on Norton Elementary School
