= Slanguage (disambiguation) =

Slanguage may refer to:

- Slang, a vocabulary of an informal register that is spoken but not formally written (which slanguage is a vocabulary of)
- Slanguage, a jargon used by Variety magazine's writers
- Slanguage (album), by Daddy Kev
- Slanguage (artist collective), an artist collective in Los Angeles, California
- SLanguages, a conference about language education in Virtual Worlds
