= Mira Loma Air Force Station =

United States Air Force facility

- Part of Air Force Logistics Command
- Located in Mira Loma, California

Site information
- Type: Air Force Base
- Controlled by: United States Air Force
- Condition: Sold

Location
- Coordinates: 34°01′33″N 117°31′59″W

Site history
- Built: March 1942
- In use: Open 1942 – closed 1986

Mira Loma Air Force Station is a closed facility of the United States Air Force. It served as a depot for ICBM missile programs operated at Norton Air Force Base and Vandenberg Air Force Base, California. It also supported civil defense radiological equipment testing and maintenance.

== History ==
=== Quartermaster Corps ===
The site of Mira Loma Air Force Station was originally constructed during World War II as the former Army Quartermaster Supply Depot at Mira Loma, California.

At Mira Loma Quartermaster Depot Colonel Charles E. Stafford established the Advance Communications Zone depot in January 1942, and on 5 June 1942 activated the San Bernardino branch, California quartermaster depot, and the Mira Loma quartermaster depot.

The military reservation was situated north of Mira Loma at the corner of Etiwanda Avenue and Highway 60. Land for the facility was purchased in 1942 in support of wartime efforts. The depot consisted of warehouses, an administration building, infirmary, training building, garage, officer's quarters, sewage disposal plant and several other buildings.

Colonel Stafford headed the depot until March 1944, when he was reassigned as special representative of the quartermaster general at the Advance Communications Zone depot in San Bernardino. His replacement was Brigadier General William R. White, following a four-year tour of duty as quartermaster for the Army force in the Central Pacific.

With the conclusion of the war in September 1945, Brigadier General White, commanding general of the Mira Loma quartermaster depot, conforming with basic policy established by the president, established a 40 hour administrative work week, Monday through Friday. "Where it is necessary for certain operating divisions to maintain a skeleton crew on Saturday and Sunday, the work week of a sufficient number of employes, [sic] will be staggered to permit the retention of a skeleton force on those days. The shorter work week will eliminate overtime pay and will give depot employees a two days a week rest after years of strenuous overtime work, General White said."

"The Mira Loma Quartermaster Depot under the Army Quartermaster Corps had an overseas distribution mission for subsistence, general supplies, clothing and equipage. Major Bryce J. Torrence has been the commanding officer."

=== Transfer to Air Force ===
Most of the property was transferred to the U.S. Air Force in 1954 and redesignated Mira Loma Air Force Station. Effective 1 January 1955, the facility became the Mira Loma Air Force Annex, under the jurisdiction of the San Bernardino Air Materiel Area, announced Maj. Gen. Edward W. Anderson, SBAMA commander.

The transfer involves an installation with approximately 527 acres of land with 1,550,000 square feet of improved open storage area. Approximately 204 Army civilian employes [sic] are also being transferred to Air Force rolls. Most of these are being retained at Mira Loma.

At present a majority of the warehouse space is occupied by fuel tanks for the Sacramento Air Materiel Area. Other Air Force supplies and Air Force non-temporary household goods, are also stored there. Also in storage is some Army technical service property and some Navy property.

With the departure of Maj. Torrence, who has given valuable assistance to the Air Force during transfer procedures, Maj. Jules M. Povala, who has been with the SBAMA Base Supply Division, was appointed military officer in charge. Steven F. Capasso will remain as administrative assistant to Maj. Povala."

In January 1957, Brig. Gen. James L. Jackson, deputy commander at SBAMA, announced the consolidation of heavy land transportation responsibilities under the Army. This change affected about 25 personnel who were transferred to other duties. "Under the new plan, the Army will assume responsibility for all heavy land transportation of supplies by rail, bus and truck.

In the late 1950s, Mira Loma AFS was designated the Office of Civil and Defense Mobilization Radiological Maintenance Shop for the Arizona and Southern California areas of Region VII, operating from OCDM Warehouse No. 931. As solid-fuel Minuteman missiles entered service from 1962, the more problematic liquid-fueled Atlas and Titan systems were removed from alert status. "All of the Atlas Ds were phased out between May and October 1964. From January through March 1965, SAC removed the Atlas Es and Fs, and by June 1965 had deactivated all of the Titan I missiles as well. The Atlas ICBMs were shipped to San Bernardino Air Material Area, Norton AFB, for storage; the Titans were stored at Mira Loma Air Force Station, near Vandenberg AFB." News accounts dated 12 December 1963 stated, however, that "Mira Loma Air Force Station at Ontario will be closed and its mission transferred to other installations in the area by December 1964." This was part of Secretary of Defense Robert S. McNamara's economy moves to consolidate military installations.

All remaining Titan I launch vehicles had been shipped to storage at Mira Loma AFS, Riverside County, by 18 April 1965. These were scrapped at Mira Loma in the spring of 1966.

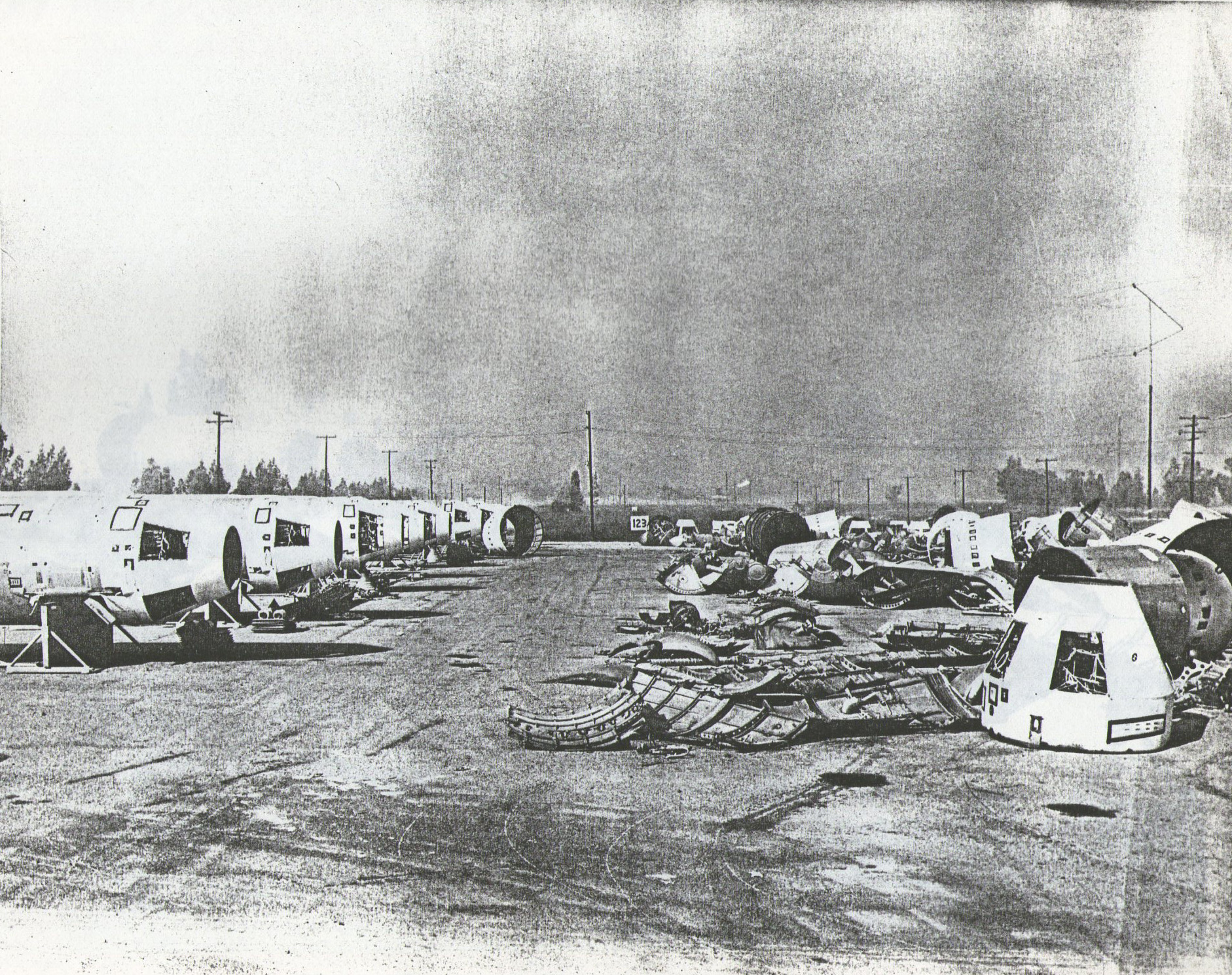
Titan-I ICBM SM vehicles being destroyed at Mira Loma AFS for the SALT-1 Treaty

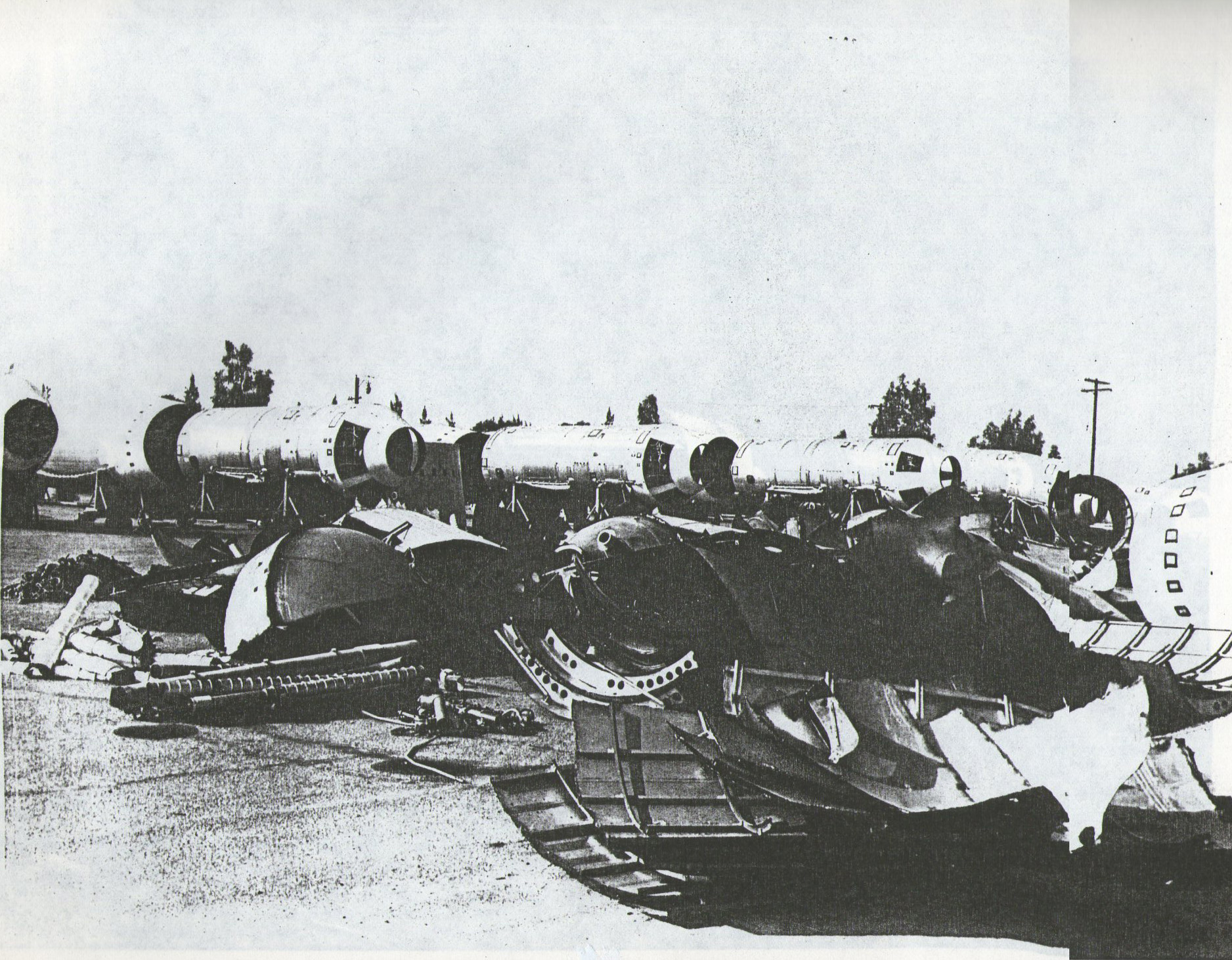
Titan-I ICBM SM vehicles being destroyed at Mira Loma AFS for the SALT-1 Treaty

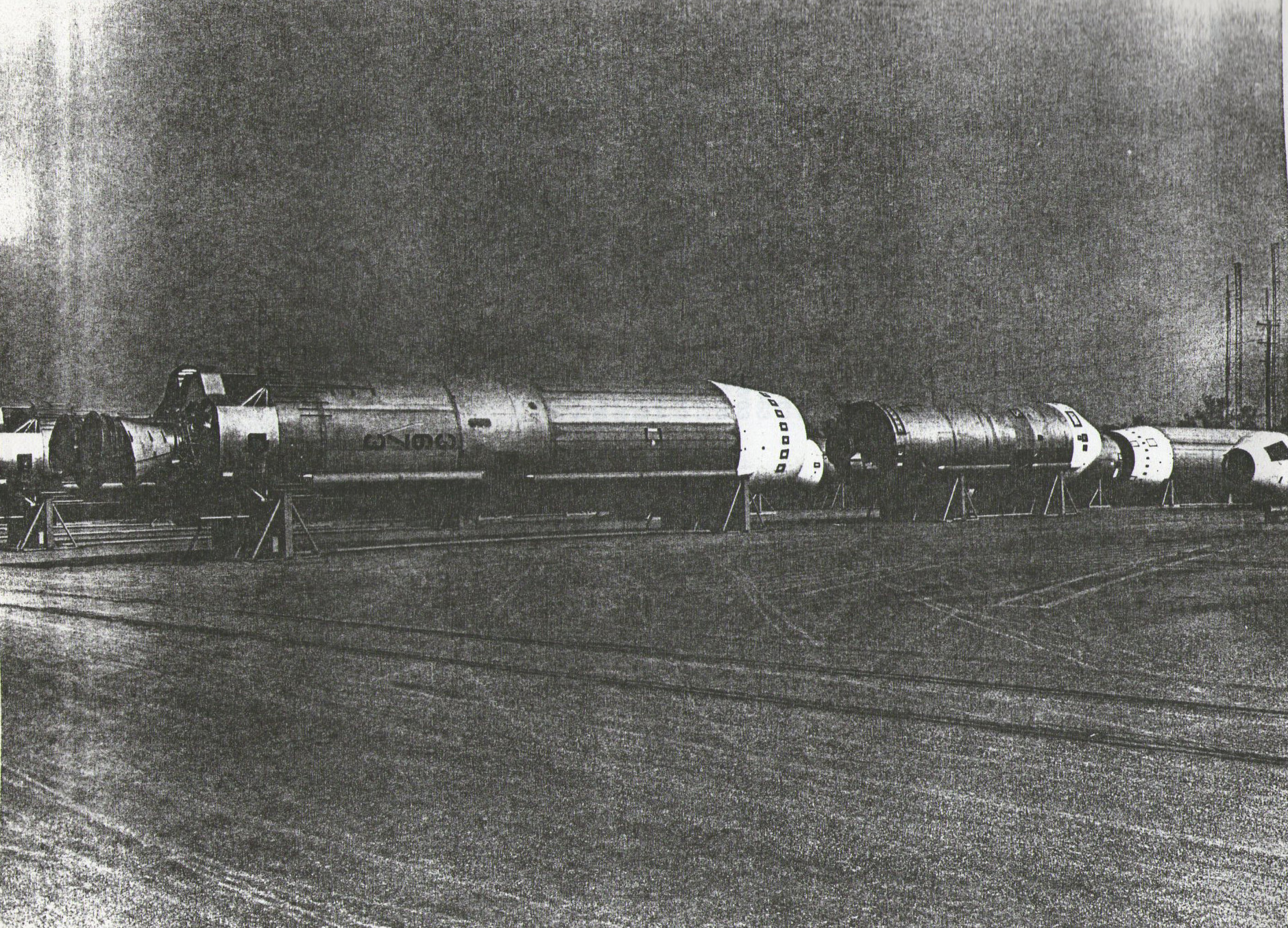
Titan-I ICBM SM vehicles being destroyed at Mira Loma AFS for the SALT-1 Treaty

=== Disposal ===
Approximately 2/3 of the land was sold to a private entity (Mira Loma Space Center) who re-developed the site as an industrial and commercial office park.

==== Rail Systems Inc. ====
Rail Systems Inc, founded in 1973 as a subsidiary of Rohr Industries and sold to North American Car Corporation (NACC) in 1977, used parts of Mira Loma Space Center to rebuild about 300 rail cars for Amtrak between 1973 and 1975.

Rail car refurbishment for Amtrak in May 1974
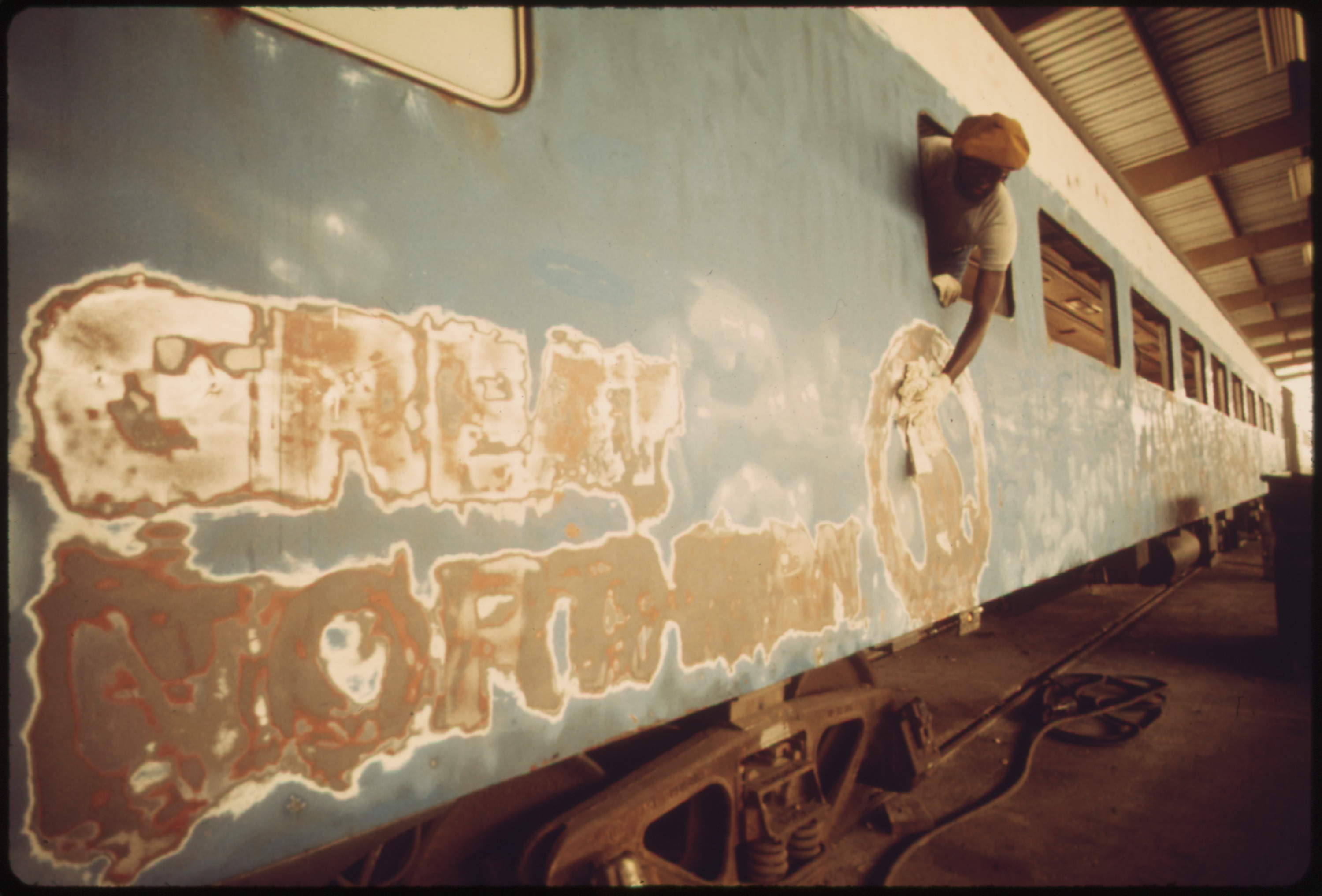

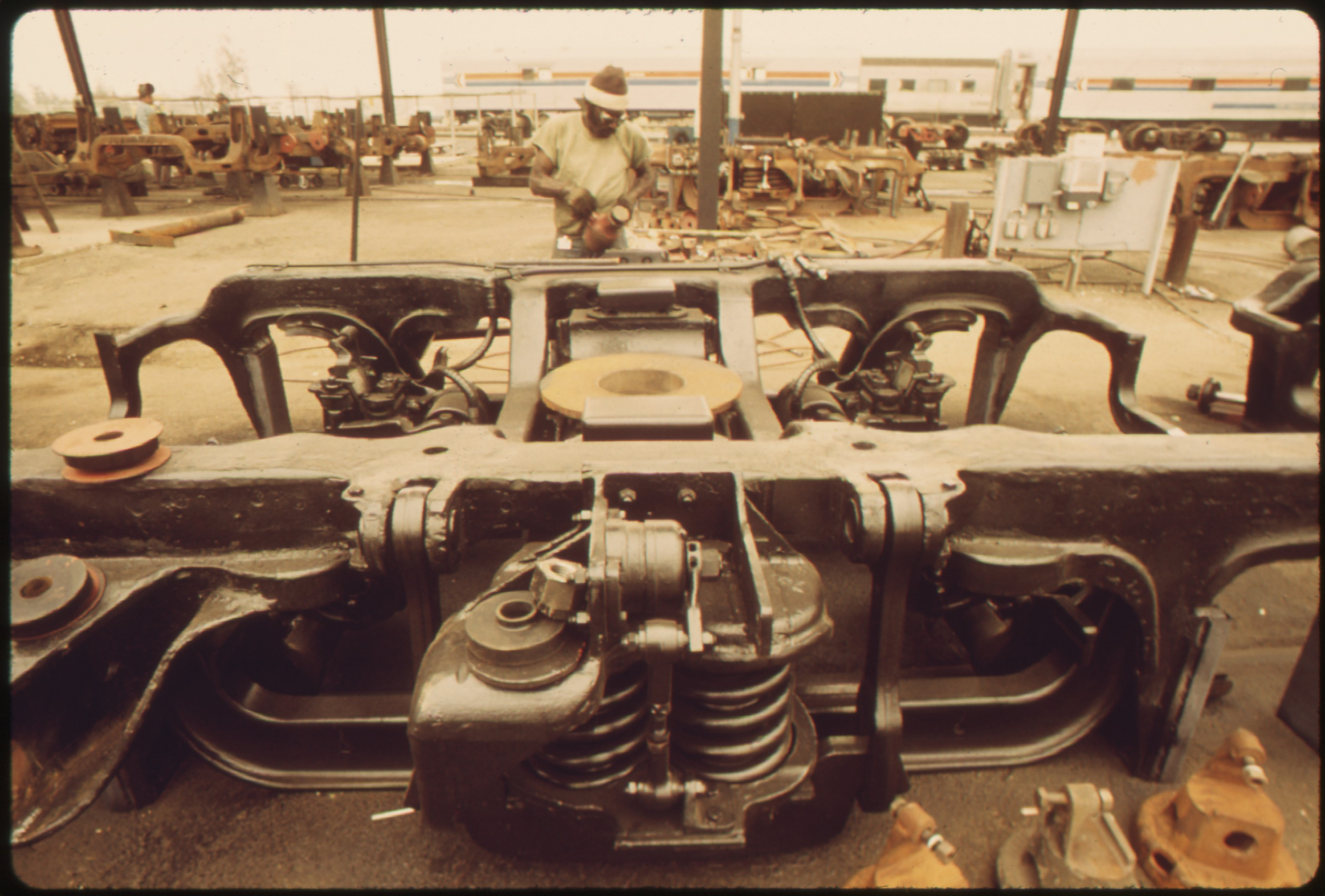

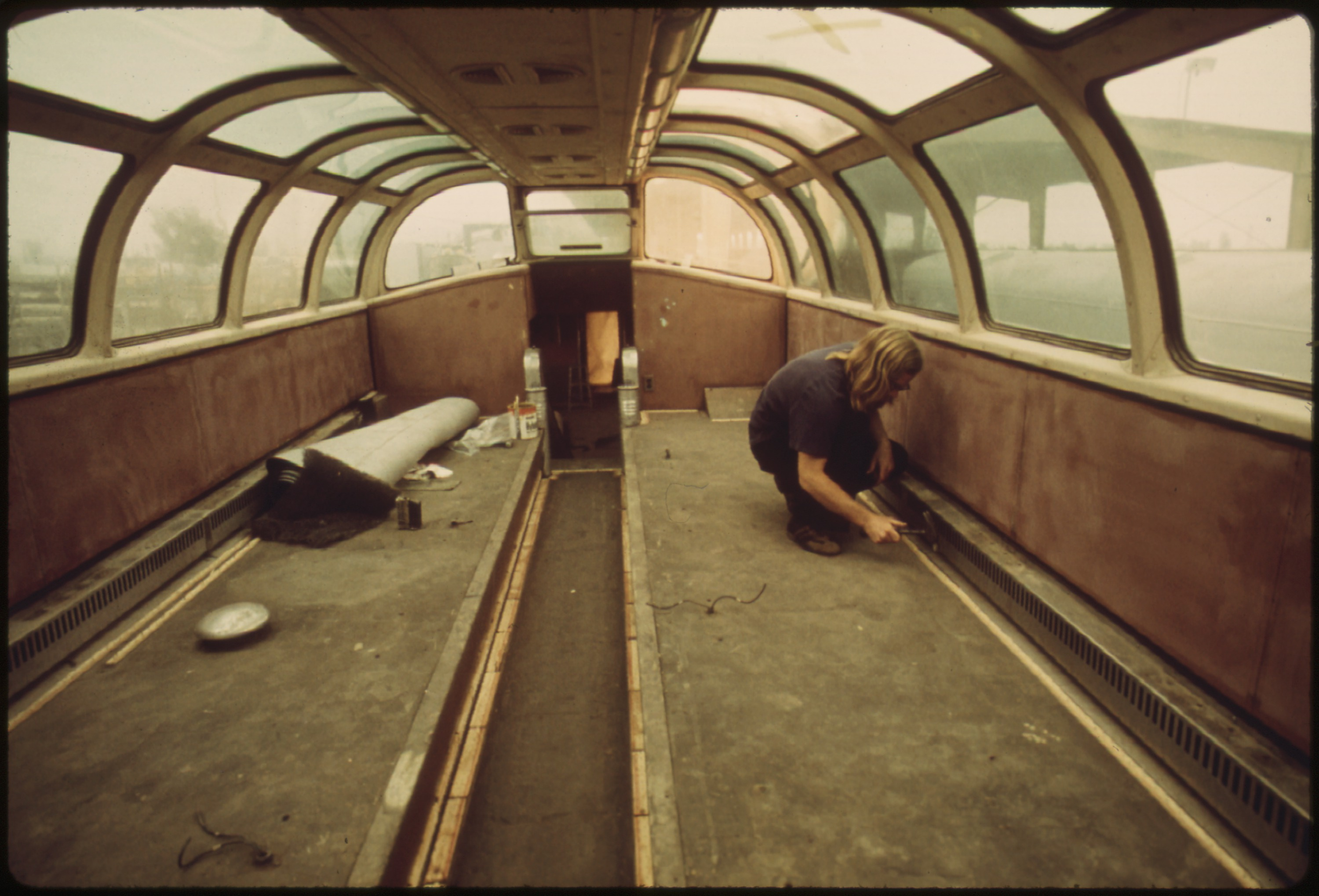

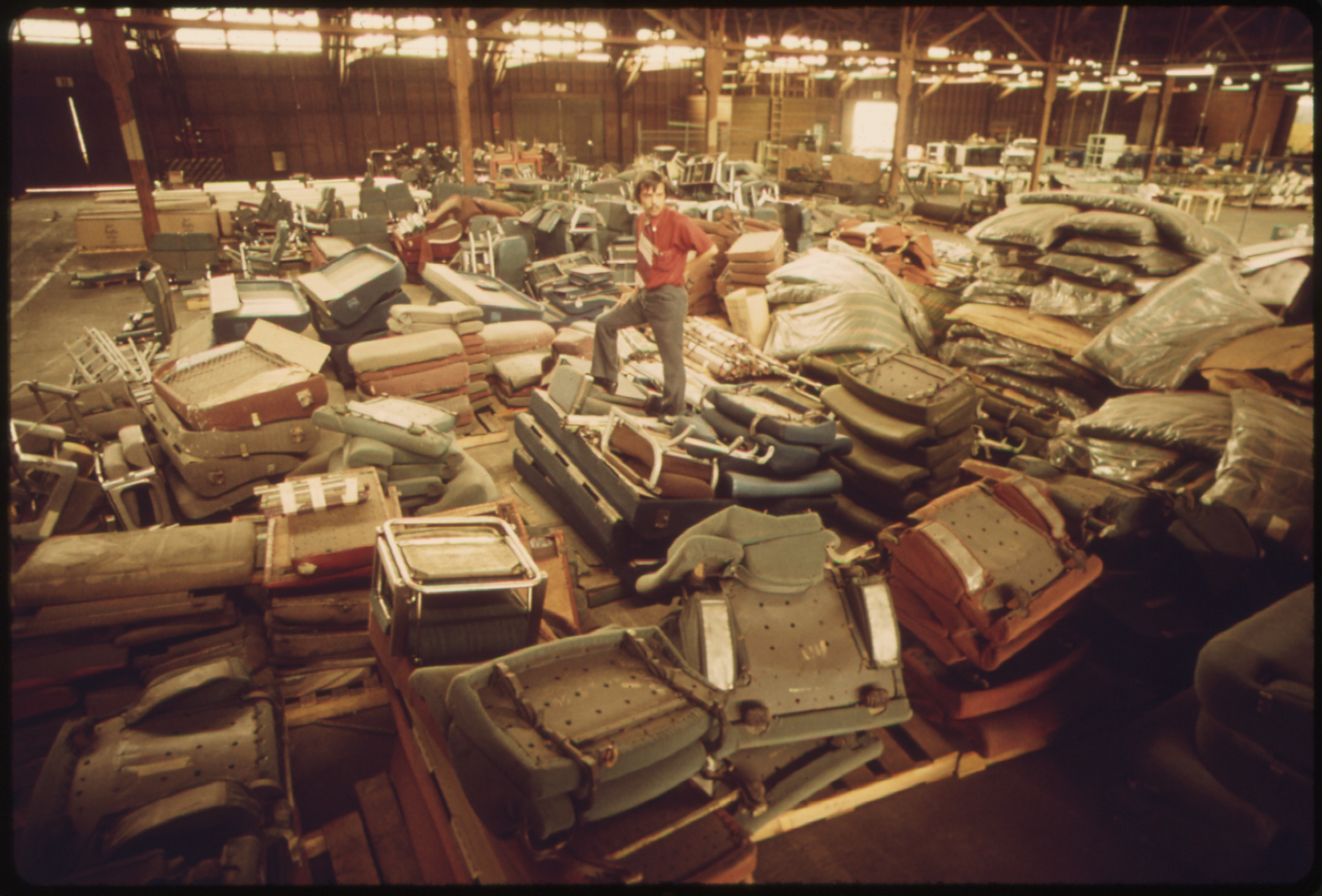

==== County of Riverside ====
The remaining portion of the property was sold to the County of Riverside in 1986. Not surprisingly, perchlorate, used in rocket fuel, has been detected at the site.

In 2022 it was demolished to build a large Amazon warehouse.
