= Kongbap =

Korean rice dish with soybeans

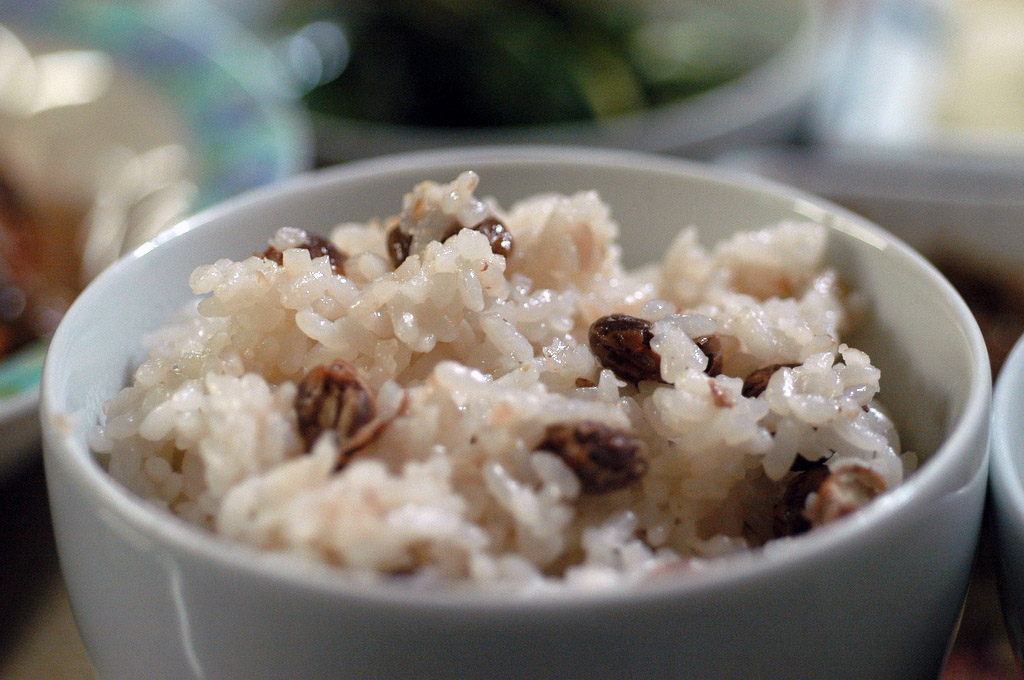
- Alternative names: Soybean rice
- Type: Bap
- Place of origin: Korea
- Associated cuisine: Korean cuisine
- Main ingredients: Rice, soybeans
- Similar dishes: Patbap

Korean name
- Hangul: 콩밥
- RR: kongbap
- MR: k'ongbap
- IPA: [kʰoŋ.bap̚]

Kongbap (Korean: 콩밥) is a Korean dish of white or brown rice cooked together with one or more varieties of soybeans. Kongbap may be made from scratch by combining and cooking together dried rice and soybeans—usually black soybeans. Outside Korea, the word "kongbap" is commercially used in premixed multi-grain packages in dried form. In Korea, multigrain rice consisting of grains other than soybeans is called japgok-bap (mixed cereal rice).

== Etymology ==
The Korean word kong (bean) alone usually refers to soybeans and is contrasted with other words like pat meaning adzuki beans. As such, kongbap (bean rice) would not also be applied to patbap (red bean rice). Rice cooked with beans other than soybeans, such as French beans (gangnangkong in Korean) or peas (wandu in Korean), are usually named using the specific bean name, as in gangnang-kong-bap (French bean rice) or wandu-kong-bap (pea rice).

== Kongbap in culture ==
Although it is generally acknowledged as a nutritious food, kongbap was not universally enjoyed as it was associated with imprisonment. Kongbap had long been a staple of Korean prison food. The Korean phrase kongbap meokda (콩밥 먹다; literally "to eat kongbap") translates colloquially as "to be imprisoned." This is similar to a phrase in England with the same meaning: "to do porridge."

With a recent health food trend in South Korea, the popularity of beans has risen and kongbap is more commonly eaten in Korean households than before.

== Similar dishes ==
- Japgok-bap (mixed-grain rice) is a bap including short-grain white and brown rice, green peas, adzuki beans, black soybeans, yulmu (Coix lacryma-jobi var. ma-yuen), black glutinous rice, barley and sorghum. The dried mixture is generally soaked in water for several hours or overnight before cooking, in order to ease the softening process of the beans while cooking.
- Patbap (red bean rice) is made from red adzuki beans.

== Gallery ==
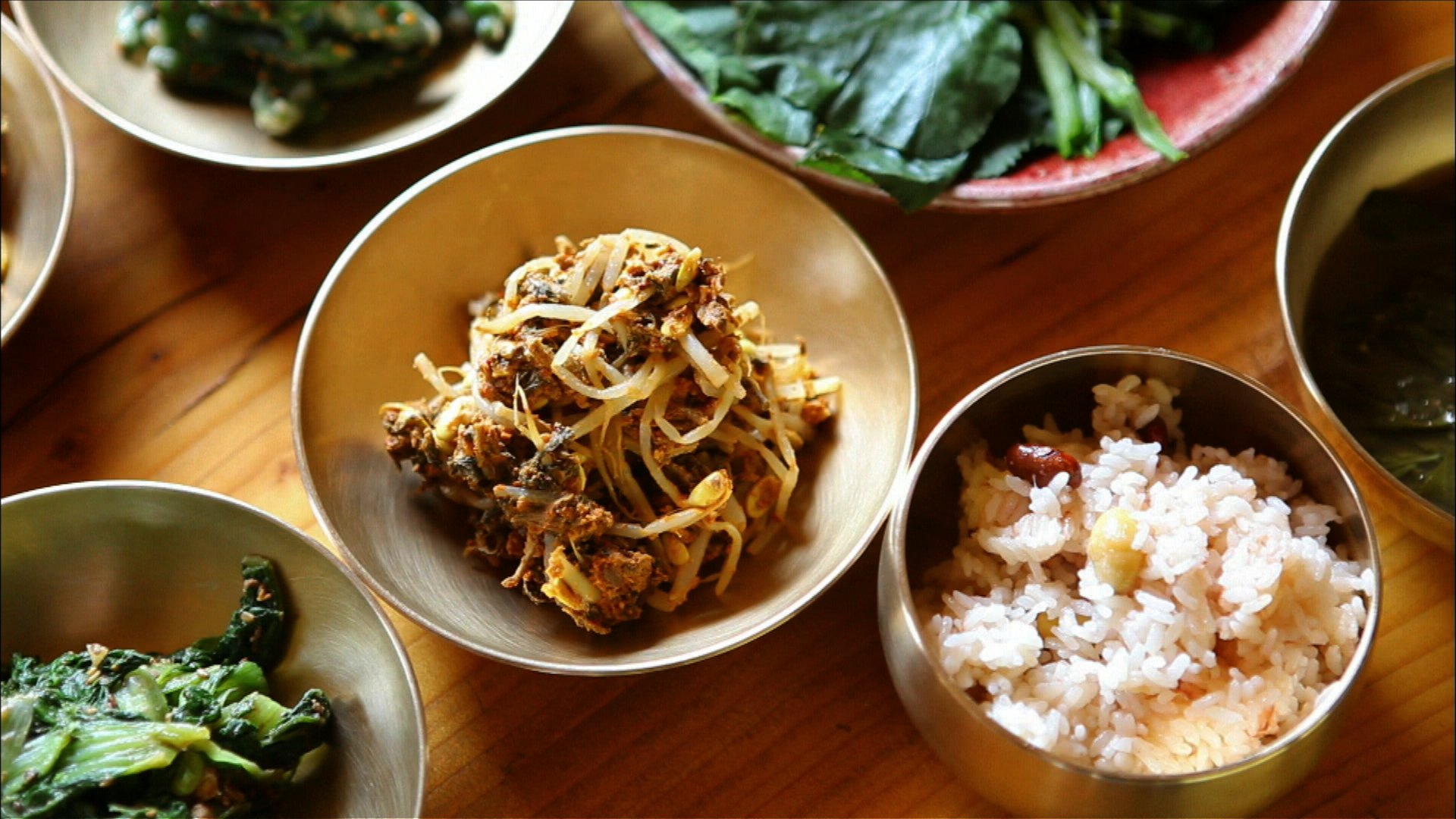
Namul (vegetable side dishes) and kongbap (lower right)

== See also ==
- List of rice dishes
- Rice and beans
- Ritschert – a European barley, bean, vegetable and pork stew also sometimes associated with prisons
- Nutraloaf – a meal common in the American penal system
