= Prison commissary =

Store within a prison

Commissary list, circa 2013.

A prison commissary or canteen is a store within a correctional facility, from which inmates may purchase products such as hygiene items, snacks, writing instruments, etc. Typically inmates are not allowed to possess cash; instead, they make purchases through an account with funds from money contributed by friends, family members, etc., or earned as wages, and prisons set a maximum limit of funds that can be spent by each inmate on commissary.

== History ==
In 1930, the U.S. Department of Justice authorized and established a commissary at each federal institution.

== Operation ==
Some prison commissaries are staffed by government employees and inmates, while others have been completely privatized. Significant price markups are common in prison commissaries, although some prison systems set maximum markups; for instance, the Delaware Department of Correction has a 20% maximum markup. $100 million in purchases were made from Texas' prison system alone in 2009. Prison commissary is a privilege that is often taken away for infractions.

== Items used as currency ==
Certain items tend to be used as currency by inmates. Cigarettes were a classic medium of exchange and some jails in both the United States and United Kingdom sell electronic cigarettes. However, in the wake of widespread prison tobacco bans, a number of other prison commissary items have taken precedence.

These include postage stamps, honey buns, instant ramen noodles, and packets of mackerel.

Instant ramen noodles—often called "soups" in prison—are a popular item due to the often bland nature of prison food, the durability of ramen noodle packages, and the uniformity or fungibility based on how one "soup" can easily be exchanged for another or multiple can be exchanged for other goods or services between prisoners in an illicit prison economy. As prison budgets are cut in the US, ramen has become a popular commodity to supplement food needs.

Packets of mackerel are another such item. In some prisons, packets of mackerel fish or "macks" has also taken prominence as a currency, as it is priced closely with one US dollar, and maintains stability. In 2021, one "mack" was equal to about one dollar; by late 2023 the price had inflated to $1.30.

These ingredients are often used by inmates to prepare meals, colloquially called "spreads".

== See also ==
- Commissary (store)
- Prison food
- Public grocery store
- Inmate telephone system – Phone systems for the incarcerated
