= Spread (meal) =

Meal made by prison inmates

A spread is a prison meal made by inmates. Spreads are often made with commissary ingredients, such as instant ramen and corn puffs. Spreads can be simple meals, or elaborate and inventive combinations of ingredients. Spreads may be used to supplement or replace the government-mandated meals provided to prisoners by the prison, due to the unpalatable and insubstantial nature of many prison meals.

== Purpose and history ==
The preparation and consumption of evening "spreads" can be a social bonding experience. Although the term "spread" was coined in US prisons, similar improvised meals are made in prisons around the world, including in the United Kingdom and many Asian countries.

A study on self-catering in Danish prisons found that being able to make choices and exercise responsibility regarding their foods had a positive impact on prisoners. The study concluded that the ability to prepare their own food according to personal preferences and cultural affinity could have a positive impact on prisoners' social re-integration after prison.

=== United States ===
The importance of spread and other commissary foods has led to the use of ramen as a currency in some prisons in the United States. The Michigan Department of Corrections reported that ramen was the most sold commissary item in 2016, ahead of coffee, rice, soap and razors. A 2016 study of a male state prison in the United States indicated that Top Ramen noodles were one of the most valuable prison commodities, due to the declining quality and quantity of food in many prisons. Diminished access to commissary food during the COVID-19 pandemic has caused inmates in some prisons to have anxiety over their ability to obtain adequate food.

== Preparation ==
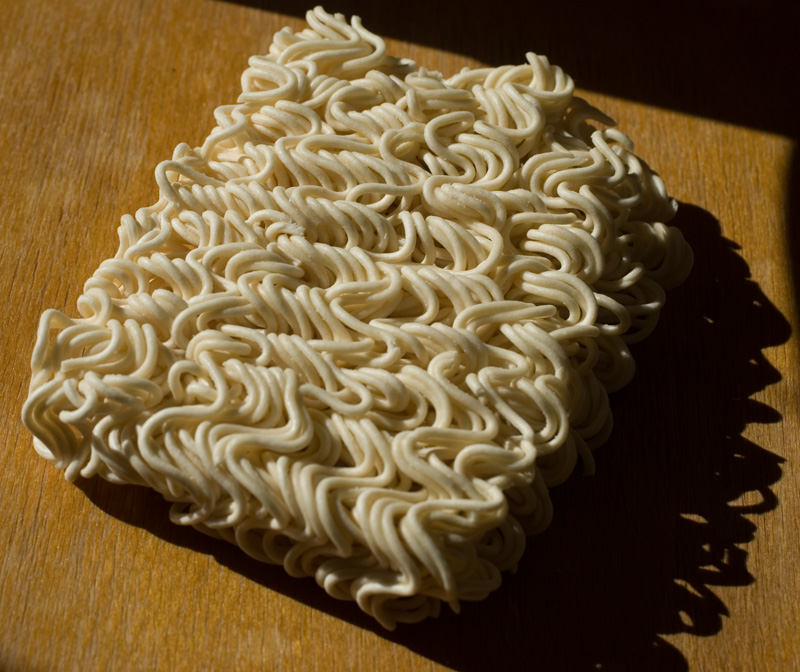
Typical instant noodles used in prison spreads

Spreads are often created using ingredients purchased from prison commissaries or saved from meals provided by the prison. Prisoners are forced to use substitutes for cooking appliances and tools due to prison safety regulations. Common substitutions include hot plates which do not reach boiling point in place of stoves, and ID cards in place of knives or other cutting tools. Some prisoners create heating elements by improvising a "stinger" by using electricity and metal nail clippers to heat up a pot of water.

== Variations and ingredients ==
The base ingredient for most spreads is cooked instant ramen noodles, to which other ingredients are added for flavor and nutritional value. Shelf stable snack ingredients like pork rinds, corn puffs, drink mixes and canned tuna are often combined into improvised recipes. Some dishes are approximations of common meals enjoyed by inmates such as dumplings, tamales, or soups, while others are more experimental. Inmates are limited in the ingredients available to them because of the expense of commissary food, often relying on money sent from relatives outside of prison.

== See also ==
- Karla Diaz, performance artist whose work focuses on spreads.
- Nutraloaf
- Prison food
- Prison wine
