= Norton Air Force Base =

US Air Force base

Norton Air Force Base
- Part of Air Mobility Command (AMC)
- Located in San Bernardino, California
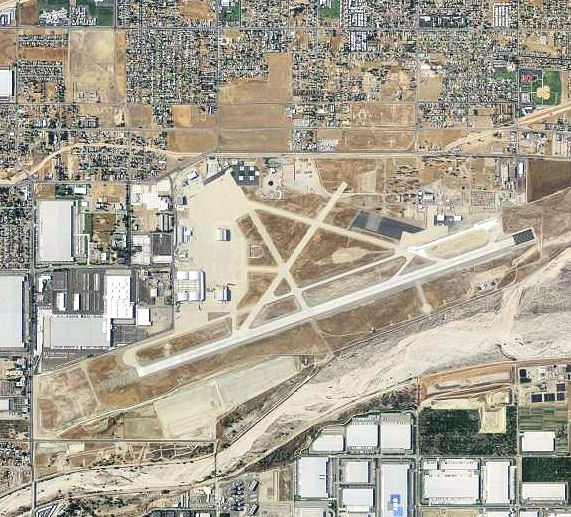
- 2006 USGS airphoto

Site information
- Type: Air Force Base
- Controlled by: United States Air Force

Location
- Location in the United States Location in California
- Coordinates: 34°05′43″N 117°14′06″W

Site history
- Built: March 1942
- In use: May 1942 – April 1994

Garrison information
- Garrison: Air Mobility Command
- Occupants: 63d Airlift Wing (various designations) (1967–1994)

Norton Air Force Base (IATA: SBD) (1942–1994) was a United States Air Force facility 2 miles (3.2 km) east of downtown San Bernardino in San Bernardino County, California.

== Overview ==
For the majority of its operational lifetime, Norton was a logistics depot and heavy-lift transport facility for a variety of military aircraft, equipment and supplies as part of Air Materiel/Air Force Logistics Command (1946–1966), then as part of Military Airlift/Air Mobility Command (1966–1994).

Major secondary missions of Norton Air Force Base was as Headquarters Air Defense Command for Southern California, during the 1950s and 1960s. The Air Force Audio-Visual Center produced air force films for training and public relations. The Air Force Now film, shown at monthly commander's calls at air force bases around the world was produced at Norton. Norton hosted numerous Air Force Reserve transport units. The Office of the Inspector General was located at Norton, as was the Directorate of Aerospace Safety and the Air Force Audit Agency Headquarters.

Norton AFB was closed in 1994 as a result of Base Realignment and Closure action 1988.

== History ==
=== Leland Francis Norton ===
Norton Air Force Base was named for San Bernardino native Captain Leland Francis Norton (1920–1944). His parents were Mr. and Mrs. Thomas F. Norton, of 716 Twenty-first Street, San Bernardino. He was commissioned 6 September 1942, at Columbus, Mississippi. Lieutenant Norton was sent to England in January 1944 after duty in the North Atlantic, flying from bases in Greenland. His parents received word on 5 May 1944 that he had been promoted to the rank of captain following a series of pre-invasion "softening-up" bombing missions. While attacking a marshaling yard on his 16th combat mission, Captain Norton's Douglas A-20 Havoc was struck by antiaircraft fire on 27 May 1944 near Amiens, France. After ordering his crew to bail out, Captain Norton perished with his aircraft. His portrait hung in the officers' club until base closing.

=== World War II ===
Norton Air Force Base began before World War II as Municipal Airport, San Bernardino, under Army Air Corps jurisdiction. The $100,000 publicly owned 900-acre site (360 ha) was dedicated on Tuesday, 17 December 1940. Due to inclement weather, the ceremonies were held on the grounds of the National Orange Show rather than at the airport itself. During the summer of 1941, it became a training base to meet the needs of the 30,000 Pilot Training Program. In December 1941, within days after the attack on Pearl Harbor, combat-ready fighter planes arrived to protect the Los Angeles area from enemy attack.

The first commanding officer was Colonel (later Major General) Lucas Victor Beau Jr., from February 1942. He set up his initial office at the San Bernardino Chamber of Commerce.

On 1 March 1942, the airport was renamed San Bernardino Army Air Field and the San Bernardino Air Depot was established there. The first aircraft arrived at the new base on 2 June 1942. The base was under the administration of the Fourth Air Service Area Command. All runways were completed by December and night flying was initiated in March 1943. Requests to establish commercial air service by Western Air Lines in mid-late 1942 were refused.

In September 1942, the personnel and training division at the base began a training program for aircraft mechanics and maintenance men, which, by mid-1944, was the largest school of its type in the Air Service command.

The weekly newspaper for the air depot in this era was named the Areascope.

During the war, Norton's primary function was the repair and maintenance of aircraft. In mid-1944, as the Army Air Force reduced its training programs, and hundreds of basic and primary training aircraft were flown to the base from all over the west for maintenance and storage.

In February 1944, the Army relocated the regulating station that had operated in the facilities of the Municipal Park in Colton since September 1943 to the Base General Depot in San Bernardino. This unique operation primarily regulated rail traffic between communications and war zones, including the evacuation of patients using hospital trains. The installation also trained personnel in the important work of transportation.

A branch post office of the San Bernardino post office was established in mid-March 1944, replacing an APO address out of Los Angeles that previously served the Base General Depot. Civilians replaced the Army personnel that previously operated the post office at the base.

A large batch of Douglas A-20 Havoc bombers were maintained at the air depot in August 1944 in strategic reserve, ready to be deployed within 72 hours to whatever fighting front required them.

An open house for the public, celebrating the thirty-seventh anniversary of U.S. Army aviation, and the first since the base was established, was held on 1 August 1944. Noted the lead editorial in the San Bernardino Daily Sun that date, "At a cost of $50,000,000, approximately 1,800 acres of farmland has been converted in a period of 28 months into a bustling military establishment. The San Bernardino Air Service command is geared to rebuild 1,000 aircraft engines monthly, to provide mountains of vital supplies for Army Air force installations at home and abroad, to overhaul gun turrets, wings and tail assemblies, repair propellers and improve landing gears. To quote its own slogan, the Air Service command 'keeps 'em flying' for victory."

On 2 August 1944, the Railroad Commission authorized the Associated Telephone Company, Ltd., to sell to the War Department for $36,138 its district telephone plant at the San Bernardino Army Air Field. The War Department already owned part of the facilities, and asked for the sale to eliminate mixed ownership.

By 1945, the base was processing hundreds of new aircraft monthly, readying them for shipment overseas. Types handled included P-51s, F-5 reconnaissance modifications of P-38s, P-47s, and P-61s. San Bernardino Air Service Technical Command also refurbished C-47s, which had seen heavy service, with the 100th C-47 refurbished at the beginning of August 1945, an overhaul process taking 16 days at a rate of one every day and a half.

An open house celebrating the Army Air Force's thirty-eighth birthday was held on 1 August 1945, with a brand new B-29 flown from the Seattle factory and a P-80 both publicly exhibited for the first time in the region. A YP-59A, 42-108771, was flown for the crowd of ~50,000.

At the end of the war, the base became a processing and separation center for the millions of servicemen being discharged. The separation center opened for business on 17 September 1945, part of an immediate program to speed up the release of a backlog of 135,000 AAF men and women, one of 32 temporary discharge bases established. San Bernardino was responsible for handling requests from qualified personnel within a 300-mile radius.

=== Desert Training Center ===
During World War II, San Bernardino Army Airfield provided administrative and logistical support for the United States Army Desert Training Center (DTC). The DTC was a massive training facility set up in the Mojave Desert; largely in Southern California and Western Arizona. Its mission was to train United States Army and Army Air Corps units and personnel to live and fight in the desert, to test and develop suitable equipment, and to develop tactical doctrines, techniques and training methods. Known sub-bases and auxiliaries set up to support DTC Army Air Force activities were:

- Desert Center Army Airfield 33°45′10″N 115°19′35″W
- Rice Army Airfield 34°03′30″N 114°48′48″W
- Gibbs Auxiliary Field 32°48′56″N 117°08′22″W
- Peik Auxiliary Field 32°46′19″N 117°12′52″W

=== Post-war ===
Western Air Lines sought again in September 1945 to introduce air service at San Bernardino but the application was denied by the Army Air Force due to heavy congestion at the depot at the time.

Housing shortages affected the base in 1946. On 15 May, Lt. Paul Smith, in charge of housing for San Bernardino Army Airfield, disclosed that 125 enlisted men and officers were seeking accommodations for themselves and their families. "They either have their families in hotels or tourist camps or are unable to be with them. We are particularly interested in relieving this condition for the enlisted men, because of the expense to the men in maintaining their families in hotels," he said. He urged property owners to contact the field's personnel affairs office, by telephone or mail, when vacancies occur.

On 7 April 1947, George G. Lundberg was named base commander.

With Congress loosening purse strings and calling for a greatly strengthened Air Force in 1948, San Bernardino Air Depot began hiring the first of 3,500 civilian workers in May, as authorized by the base's reactivation program. The depot hired 450 for immediate requirements with the remainder of the 3,500 added over the next six months. In June 1948, 2,190 civilians were employed at the base representing an annual payroll of $1,539,000.

=== California Air National Guard ===
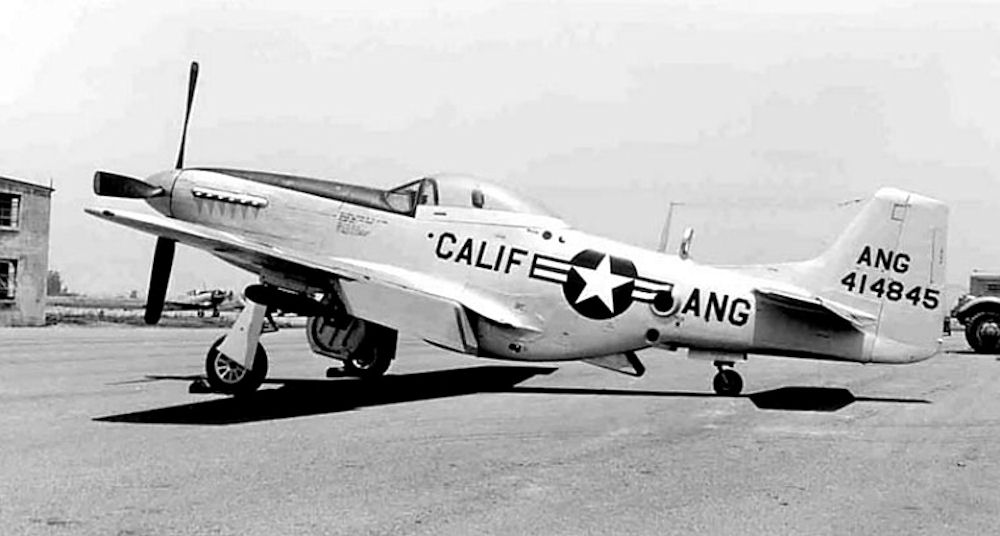
196th Fighter Squadron – North American P-51D-10-NA Mustang, 44-14845, 1947

The wartime 411th Fighter Squadron was allotted to the California Air National Guard, on 24 May 1946 and redesignated as the 196th Fighter Squadron. It was organized at Norton Air Force Base, on 12 September 1946 and federally recognized on 9 November 1946. The squadron was equipped with P-51D Mustangs and assigned to the 146th Fighter Group, at Van Nuys Airport by the National Guard Bureau.

The squadron trained for tactical fighter missions and air-to-air combat under the supervision of Fourth Air Force. In June 1948, the unit received 25 F-80C Shooting Star aircraft. The 196th was one of the first Air National Guard units to receive these new jets.

The 196th was federalized on 10 October 1950 due to the Korean War and departed Norton at this time.

=== Air Base Wing ===
From 1 May 1953, installation support was provided by the 2848th Air Base Wing. This unit replaced the 2950th Air Base Wing, and would last until 8 July 1964.

=== Expansion ===
Bids were opened on 15 September 1953 for nearly a million dollars of work at Norton, including a 2,450-foot extension of the southwest - northeast runway bringing it to 10,000 feet, long enough for anything in the inventory. The extension required the closing of the east end of Mill Street at Tippecanoe Avenue, and the relocation of the Pacific Electric track, both of which right-of-ways the runway would cross. The project included taxiways and drainage facilities. The widening of the runway by 50 feet to 200 feet was also proposed. Traffic to Redlands was rerouted off of Mill Street to Central Avenue.

"Directives to acquire land for the runway lengthening were signed in June by the secretary of the Air Force and sent to the Los Angeles office of the U.S. Army Corps of Engineers."

=== Logistics Depot ===
With the air force moving into the jet age by the mid 1940s, Norton began overhauling jet engines in 1945, and the San Bernardino Air Materiel Area became one of three air force jet overhaul centers by 1953. To accommodate the largest Strategic Air Command (SAC) bombers, the main runway was extended to 10,000 ft by 1954. B-45 Tornado upgrades were performed at Norton in the late 1940s and into the 1950s.

Effective 1 January 1955, the former Army Quartermaster depot at Mira Loma became the Mira Loma Air Force Annex, under the jurisdiction of the San Bernardino Air Materiel Area, announced Maj. Gen. Edward W. Anderson, SBAMA commander.

On 22 March 1956, the San Bernardino Daily Sun reported that "In compliance with stated Air Force policy directing the depots to concentrate their immediate efforts in support of weapons systems with high priority and tactical value, Headquarters AMC recently advised San Bernardino that depot shops here had been selected to service and maintain F100 fighter aircraft. Moving with justifiable speed, the first group of aircraft are already on the base and have started through the IRAN [inspect and repair as necessary - Ed.] line. Numbers to be handled the balance of fiscal 1956 and subsequently is classified information, but the volume is sufficient to occupy some hundreds of NAFB employes [sic] in both Maintenance and Supply, as well as to fill the big hanger [sic] and apron with many of the hottest operational aircraft in existence. Present plans call for locating a double production line for F100s where the B45 aircraft is currently being handled inside the big hangar on the east. The B45 operation will be moved gradually outside to apron space now under construction." The article also noted the addition of B-66s, F-102s, and J57 turbojets to SBAMA responsibility.

Construction of an 18-hole golf course on the base was announced on 29 March 1956.

On 29 November 1957, General Thomas D. White disclosed the development of an anti-missile called the Wizard, the assignment of intercontinental and intermediate-range ballistic missile programs to SAC, and a transfer of the 1st Missile Division to SAC. The San Bernardino Air Force Depot was to assume support for long-range ballistic missile programs. Five civilian contractors attached to the Directorate of Ballistic Missiles at Norton Air Force Base were killed on 21 April 1958 in the crash of United Airlines Flight 736. They were en route to conferences at Offutt Air Force Base, headquarters of SAC.

In the 1960s, Norton expanded its depot support mission by supporting Titan and Atlas Intercontinental Ballistic Missiles (ICBM's), with depot-level logistical support. Also, the Space and Missile Systems Organization (SAMSO), which managed the LGM-30 Minuteman and LGM-118 Peacekeeper programs, was located at Norton from the 1960s. "In January 1961 the new Air Force Secretary, Eugene M. Zuckert, met with top Air Force officials to consider a proposal to relocate the Ballistic Missile Division from Inglewood to San Bernardino Air Materiel Area at Norton AFB, California." As solid-fuel Minuteman missiles entered service, the more problematic liquid-fueled Atlas and Titan systems were removed from alert status. "All of the Atlas Ds were phased out between May and October 1964. From January through March 1965, SAC removed the Atlas Es and Fs, and by June 1965 had deactivated all of the Titan I missiles as well. The Atlas ICBMs were shipped to San Bernardino Air Material Area, Norton AFB, for storage; the Titans were stored at Mira Loma Air Force Station, near Vandenberg AFB." Upon base closure, the mission of SAMSO was transferred to Los Angeles Air Force Station, later, Los Angeles Air Force Base.

On 8 July 1964, the 2848th Air Base Wing was replaced by the 2848th Air Base Group.

The Air Materiel Area was disestablished in 1966.

=== Strategic Airlift ===
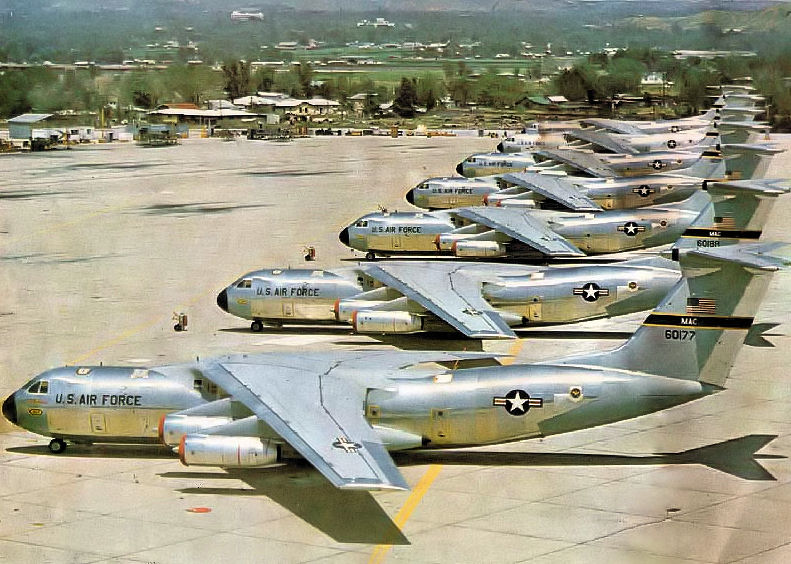
New 63d MAW C-141As on the ramp at Norton AFB, 1967. Serial 66-0177 is in foreground. This aircraft would become the "Hanoi Taxi" and today is on permanent display at the National Museum of the United States Air Force

A change of mission in 1966 from Air Force Logistics Command to Military Airlift Command (MAC) meant that Norton became one of six Military Airlift Command strategic-airlift bases, supporting US Army and Marine Corps' airlift requirements among other functions. Also, a new MAC passenger terminal was built to replace the World War II era (1944) facility to better handle passenger traffic, primarily to and from Southeast Asia. The new airline-style building was activated in 1968. The base newspaper in this era was named The Globetrotter.

Discreet C-130 Hercules modification tests were conducted out of Area II of the base in the late 1960s, with the 1198th Operational Evaluation and Training Squadron operating four highly classified C-130E(I) special operations testbeds modified at Lockheed Air Services, at near-by Ontario Airport under projects Thin Slice and Heavy Chain. Their electronics suites were developed for and identical to those of the MC-130 Combat Talon, with the addition of AN/APQ-115 Forward looking infrared, and 1198th OE&TS test missions were flown out of Takhli Royal Thai Air Force Base, Thailand, under project "Heavy Chain", with the aircraft painted all-black.

A base railroad system interchanged with the Pacific Electric/Southern Pacific branch line on the south side of the installation. When base rail operations were discontinued in the late 1970s, the base diesel locomotive, a General Electric centercab B/B 90/90, USAF 8580, was donated to the Orange Empire Railway Museum at Perris, California.

=== Air Defense Command ===
In 1950, Air Defense Command activated the 27th Air Division (Defense) at Norton AFB, being assigned to the Western Air Defense Force. Its mission was the air defense of southern California and later southern Nevada. By 1953, its area of control included a small portion of Arizona. The 27th AD controlled both aircraft interceptor squadrons, as well as general surveillance antiaircraft radar squadrons.

In 1955, the 27th AD established a Manual Air-Defense Control Center (ADCC) (P-84) at Norton to monitor and track aircraft in Southern California. This manual site was replaced in 1959 by a Semi Automatic Ground Environment (SAGE) Data Center (DC-17) 34°06′19″N 117°13′05″W. The SAGE system was an automated computer network linking Air Force (and later FAA) General Surveillance Radar stations into a centralized center for air defense, intended to provide early warning and response for a Soviet nuclear attack. It was initially under the Los Angeles Air Defense Sector (LAADS), established on 1 February 1959 by redesignation of 27th Air Division.

LAADS was inactivated on 1 April 1966 and the designation was returned as the 27th Air Division, being stationed at Luke AFB, Arizona under Fourth Air Force as part of a consolidation with the inactivating Phoenix Air Defense Sector. DC-17 at Norton was inactivated a few months later on 25 June 1966, its mission being consolidated with SAGE Data Center DC-21 at Luke AFB under the 27th AD.

The SAGE Direction Center closed in 1966 along with the other ADC facilities at Norton. It became the home of the Air Force Audiovisual Service. The windowless, temperature controlled SAGE structure was perfect for film storage. It also was the home of the Air Combat Camera Service. After Norton closed in April 1994, the facility was essentially abandoned, and remained so until 2018 when the building was demolished to make room for future development.

=== Closure ===
Norton was placed on the Department of Defense's base closure list in 1989 (the same year that the DoD signed the Federal Facilities Agreement with the EPA).

The closure was cited as due to environmental wastes, inadequate facilities, and air traffic congestion (due to air traffic from Ontario International Airport, twenty miles (32 km) west, and Los Angeles International Airport, 60 miles (97 km) west).

The last of the facilities on the base were closed in 1995.

=== Previous names ===
- Municipal Airport San Bernardino (under Army Air Forces jurisdiction), 2 July 1942
- San Bernardino Army Air Field, 14 July 1942
- San Bernardino Air Field, 24 December 1947
- San Bernardino Air Force Base, 13 January 1948
- Norton Air Force Base, 2 March 1950 – 1 April 1994

=== Major commands to which assigned ===
- Fourth Air Force, 2 July 1942 – 13 October 1942
- Air Service Command, 13 October 1942 – 14 July 1944
- AAF Materiel and Services Command, 14 July – 31 August 1944
- AAF Technical Services Command, 31 August 1944 – 1 July 1945
- Air Technical Services Command, 1 July 1945 – 9 March 1946
- Air Materiel Command, 9 March 1946 – 1 April 1961
- Air Force Logistics Command, 1 April 1961 – 1 July 1966
- Military Airlift Command, 1 July 1966 – 1 June 1992
- Air Mobility Command, 1 June 1992 – 1 April 1994

=== Major units assigned ===
- 2193rd Communications Squadron

- 11th Station Complement, 11 May 1942 – 1 February 1943
- 499th Base HQ/Air Base Squadron, 1 February 1943 – 1 April 1944
- 4126th Army Air Force Base Unit, 1 April 1944 – 26 September 1947
- 4126th Air Force Base Unit, 26 September 1947 – 31 August 1948
- 2928th Depot Maintenance Group, 31 August 1948 – 1 May 1953
- 9077th Air Reserve Group, 17 June 1949 – 1 November 1955
- 29th Air Depot Wing, 10 November 1949 – 10 November 1951
- San Bernardino Air Material Area, 1 December 1949 – 1 July 1966
- 1002d Inspector General Group, 1950s - 31 December 1971
- 2950th Depot Training Wing, 7 November 1951 – 19 November 1952
- 2848th Air Base Wing, 1 May 1953 – 1 April 1967
- Air Force Audio-Visual Center, 8 April 1969 – 30 March 1994
- 63d Military Airlift Wing, 1 April 1967 – 30 March 1994
- 944th Military Airlift Group, 25 March 1968 – 1 July 1993 (AFRES)
- 445th Military Airlift Wing, 1 July 1973 – 30 March 1994 (AFRES)
- 27th Air Division, 20 September 1950 – 1 October 1959
- Los Angeles Air Defense Sector, 15 February 1959 – 25 June 1966
- 1st Fighter-Interceptor Wing, 1 December 1951 – 6 February 1952
- 4705th Defense Wing, 1 February 1952 – 1 March 1952
- 659th Aircraft Control and Warning Squadron, 20 June 1953 – 22 June 1955
- 685th Aircraft Control and Warning Squadron, 1 January 1951 – 6 February 1952
- 865th Radar Squadron (SAGE), 8 November 1955 – 1 April 1956

- 1601st USAF Dispensary (Medical and Dental Clinics), dates including 1967-1970
- 630 Maintenance Squadron (Total years unknown, but was probably organized in April 1967 along with the 63d MAW. The 630 MS did exist in 1969-70 as noted on my orders when assigned there)
- Military Airlift Command Non-Commissioned Officer Academy
- 1835th E&I Squadron

=== Highlights ===
- On 24 March 1944, the second of only two Vultee XP-54 experimental fighters made its first and only flight, landing at Norton with a failed Lycoming engine. The XP-54 project was canceled and the airframe grounded to support the first prototype.
- Norton AFB served as the last assignment for Chuck Yeager. He retired at the base on 1 June 1975.
- Norton AFB was the final duty station of Sgt. John Levitow, the lowest ranking member of the Air Force to be awarded the Medal of Honor, where he served as a loadmaster with the 63d Military Airlift Wing.
- The famed C-141 Starlifter Hanoi Taxi was based at Norton AFB with the 63d Military Airlift Wing at the time of its famous missions as part of Operation Homecoming.
- In 1957, while flying aboard a C-124 Globemaster II, the WAF Band was invited by General James L. Jackson, Deputy Commander of the San Bernardino Air Materiel Area, Air Materiel Command, to move to his headquarters at Norton AFB. The move took place in January 1958. The band retained its training and chain-of-command connection with the USAF band school at Bolling AFB, Washington, D.C. At Norton, the band found it easier to schedule C-124 planes and pilots to keep up their touring schedule. Upon arriving, the 55 female airmen discovered that their new housing facilities were tiny cubicles for rooms and that the shared bathroom had no doors on the toilet stalls, a disappointing change from their former quarters at Lackland AFB, Texas, and at Bolling. The women worked to transform the barracks into a more homey atmosphere. The WAF Band was inactivated in 1961. Because of the warm climate and welcoming environment, some of the women airmen settled permanently in the San Bernardino area after their tour of duty.

== Current status ==
The aviation facilities of the base were converted into San Bernardino International Airport, and 3 of the 4 stationed squadrons (all 4 of which were part of the 63d and 445th Military Airlift Wings) – C-141 Starlifter, C-21, and C-12 Huron aircraft – were moved to nearby March Air Force Base, while the remaining squadron – C-141 aircraft – was moved to McChord Air Force Base, Washington. Control of the airport and surrounding facilities was turned over to a consortium consisting of several nearby cities to manage and oversee its operation. In March 2018, United Parcel Service began operating five cargo flights each week out of the airport. Previously, UPS used the airport for holiday shipments to the company's hub in Louisville. FedEx Express also began operating daily cargo flights out of San Bernardino International Airport in October 2018 under terms of a new 10-year agreement. In recent years, the airport has added more than 60 acres of concrete ramp, a new 5,000-square-foot cross-dock building with 1.6 acres of secured landside ramp, nearly 100 acres of developable land and specialized cargo equipment. Charter as well as private flights do operate from SBIA and it is also used as a base for firefighting planes when needed.

Recently, private development on the former base has helped turn the unused land into jobs and revenue for the city of San Bernardino as several companies have opened distribution centers on the property. Mattel opened a distribution center in 2004, consolidating three smaller ones in Southern California into a single location. Stater Brothers Markets built a new headquarters and a centralized warehousing facility. The completion of the project in 2007 consolidated the headquarters and a warehouse in nearby Colton and other warehouses in the Inland Empire into a single location. Industrial buildings used by Pep Boys Auto and Kohl's are located on the premises.

== Norton in popular culture ==
- Norton AFB was the filming site of The Twilight Zone episode "The Last Flight" in which a World War I Royal Flying Corps pilot is transported in time in a cloud to 1959. An authentic Nieuport 28 was provided and flown by Frank Tallman, a Hollywood stunt pilot. The episode first aired on 5 February 1960.
- Norton AFB is mentioned in the 1992 film Sneakers. Dan Aykroyd's character Mother states "O.K., boss, this LTX-27 concealable mic is part of the same system that NASA used when they faked the Apollo Moon landings. Yeah, the astronauts broadcast around the world from a soundstage at Norton Air Force Base in San Bernardino, California. So it worked for them, shouldn't give us too many problems."
- While preparing for The Division Bell Tour, Pink Floyd spent most of March 1994 rehearsing in a hangar at Norton AFB.
- Some scenes for The Fast and the Furious movies were filmed on the flight lines.
- The X-Files season 7 Episode "Closure" was filmed on the base.
- Hangar and runway scenes of The Aviator were filmed on the flightline.
- A scene from the 1979 film When Hell Was in Session starring Hal Holbrook was filmed at Norton Airforce Base. Holbrook (who played Commander Jeremiah Denton) arrives and is processed to leave Vietnam. A nearby hangar and a C-141 can be seen, as well as some Norton Airmen who were used as extras.

== See also ==
- San Bernardino International Airport
- California World War II Army Airfields
- List of USAF Aerospace Defense Command General Surveillance Radar Stations
- Norton AFB Museum http://www.nafbmuseum.org/
