= William R. White (United States Army officer) =

United States Army general

Brigadier General William Robert White (January 14, 1887 – March 5, 1975) was a United States Army officer who served in both World War I and World War II. Following a combat command in the first conflict, he transferred to the quartermaster corps and served in various capacities throughout the second war.

== Service history ==
During World War I, General White commanded a company in the Fourth machine gun battalion, Second division. “In 1920 he transferred to the quartermaster corps and had held various positions in the war department and other important assignments.”

“Shortly after the attack on Pearl Harbor, General White was appointed director of food control for the civilian population of the Hawaiian islands by the military governor, which position he administered until the return to civilian control. In addition to this assignment he commanded the war dog training center in Honolulu, where dogs were trained as attack, warning, and undercover dogs for use in our combat areas.”

In March 1944, General White took command of the Army’s quartermaster depot at Mira Loma, California, following a four-year tour of duty as quartermaster for the Army force in the central Pacific. He held this post through the end of the war in 1945.

== Education ==
General White was a graduate of the command and general staff school at Fort Leavenworth, Kansas; the Army War College, Washington, D.C.; and the quartermaster corps school.

== Honours ==
General White was decorated by the French government following World War I, and received the Legion of Merit for his work in the central Pacific area.
