= Karla Diaz =

American performance artist

- Born: Los Angeles
- Education: Master of Fine Arts
- Alma mater: California Institute of the Arts
- Notable work: Prison Gourmet
- Spouse: Mario Ybarra Jr.

Karla Diaz is an American artist who collects recipes from prison inmates and recreates them in performance using only ingredients and utensils available to those incarcerated. Her multi-media participatory performance piece Prison Gourmet comments on system-impacted communities and people, the politics of food and questions about institutional power. She has been exhibited in Spain, the UK and at multiple museums in the US. She teaches at California State University Long Beach. She and her husband cofounded the artists' collective Slanguage.

== Early life and education ==
Diaz was born in Los Angeles. She grew up there and in Mexico. She received a Master's in Fine Arts from California Institute of the Arts in 2004.

Diaz first became aware of recipes created by inmates when a mentor, poet Manazar Gamboa, who between the ages of 20 and 43 had spent 17 years in state prisons, shared the "special recipe" for his favorite dish. Diaz recollected that the recipe, an imitation of tuna casserole, included tuna, mayonnaise, hot sauce, pickle juice, and was topped with crumbled crackers. She later described it as not tasting very good.

== Career ==
Diaz collects recipes from prison inmates and recreates them in performance using only the ingredients and makeshift utensils available to those incarcerated. Prison Gourmet is a multi-media participatory performance which focuses the food prisoners make for themselves as a supplement to that served to them by the institution. The performances comment on issues of system-impacted communities and people, the politics of food and questions about institutional power.

In 2010 Diaz's brother was incarcerated, and she learned that the prison commissary offered a limited selection of shelf-stable foods such as dry snacks such as chips or corn puffs and instant noodles. She recalled the dish Gamboa had prepared and began writing to inmates and former inmates in California, asking for their recipes. As of 2015 she had received 200 recipes. Some of the recipe instructions are very detailed, calling for specific equipment such as a 6" square paper box, a 12.5 ounce cereal bag with no holes, or commonly jury-rigged prison cooking devices such as a stinger. Some call for specific techniques such as putting ingredients and hot water into a plastic bag, tying the bag off, wrapping it in a towel to retain the heat, and allowing it to sit for a half hour to cook the ingredients. Recipes she has collected include imitations of traditional Mexican soups. The most common recipe she receives are for spreads, which usually involve topping instant noodles with dry snacks and/or other ingredients.

In 2010 Diaz began exhibiting a 2-hour performance piece, Prison Gourmet, first performed for the Los Angeles County Museum of Art's EATLACMA event, in which she demonstrates the preparation of an imitation of orange chicken, a recipe calling for pork rinds coated in a mixture of strawberry jelly and Kool Aid. After performances the audience is invited to sample the dish. Since then she has exhibited at the Whitney Museum, the Institute of Contemporary Art, the Newcomb Art Museum, the San Jose Museum of Art, the Serpentine, the Institute Cervantez, Pitzer College, MOCA, and ESMoA.

According to Diaz, prison food recipes are less about the dishes' taste and more about "a reminder of humanity, community, and the person you were on the outside". The inmate from whom she'd received the orange chicken recipe told her that although the finished dish was a poor imitation of the original, making and eating it reminded him of the times he and his daughter had made real orange chicken for themselves and of spending that time with her.

Diaz is on the faculty at California State University Long Beach. She and her husband, Mario Ybarra, also run an artists' collective, Slanguage, which they co-founded in 2002.

== Recognition ==
Diaz has received a Los Angeles Arts Recognition award. In 2015 she received a grant from the Art Matters Foundation. She has done three residencies as a Lucas Arts Fellow at the Montalvo Arts Center. She and Ybarra, representing Slanguage, did a residency at 18th Street Arts Center.
