= Ritschert =

Stew from Bavaria, Austria and Slovenia

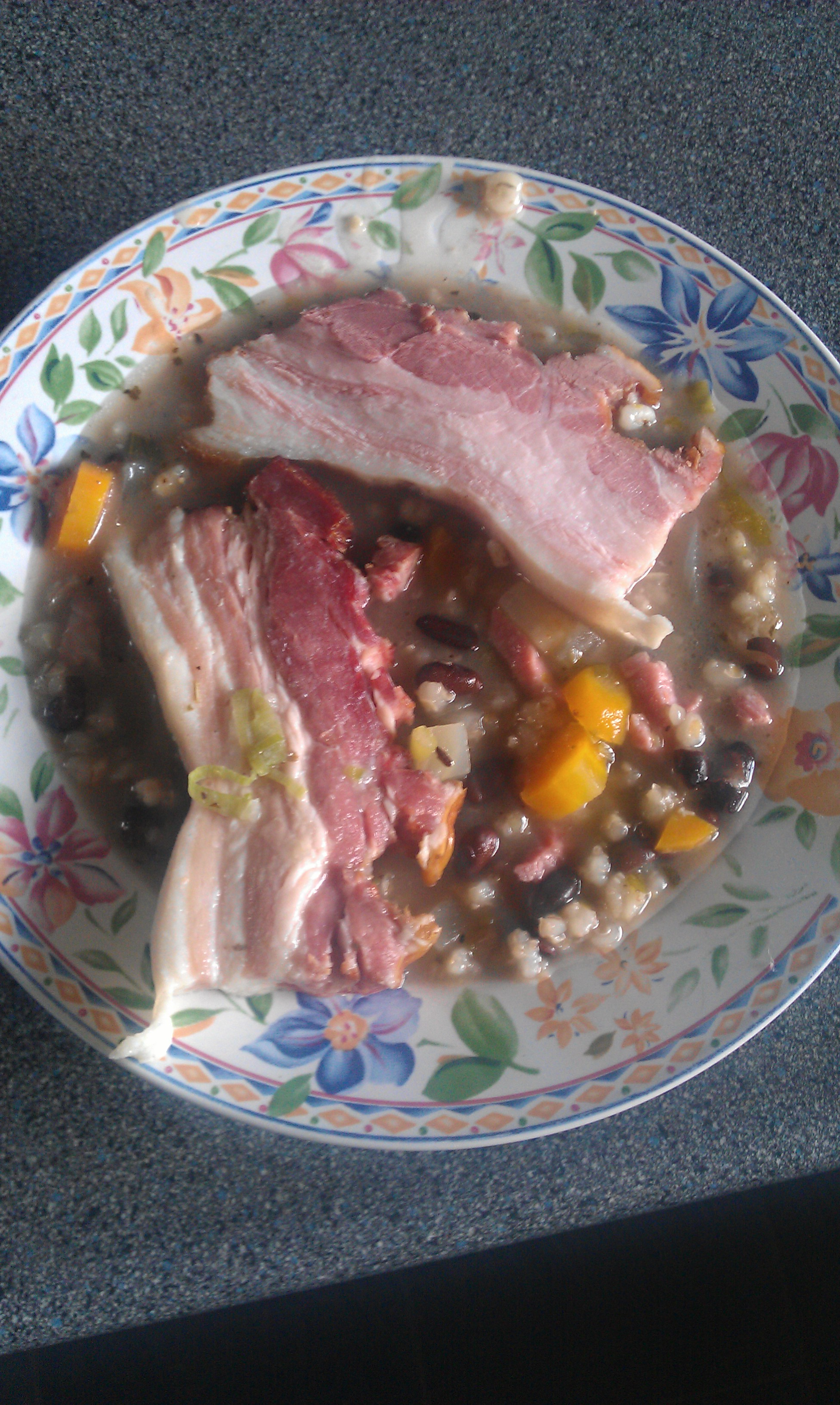

Ričet (German: Ritschert) is a traditional dish found in Slovenia, Austria, Bavaria and parts of Croatia (continental Northern regions). It is a thick soup containing pot barley, beans, potatoes, carrots, parsley, celery, leeks, tomatoes, onions, garlic, and usually a substantial amount of cured pork. Depending on the amount of water used, it may be a soup or a thick porridge similar to a risotto.

== Etymology ==
The word ričet is typical of central Slovenia, including Ljubljana, and derives from Styrian German ritschet or ritschert. Etymologists suggest that ričet is a derivation from two German expressions: rutschen, "to slip, slide", and rutschig, "slippery". In fact, ričet is fairly greasy dish.

It has a historical reputation of being served to prisoners.

== See also ==
- Slovenian cuisine
- Kongbap, the Korean grain and legume dish, also sometimes associated with prison food service
