= Nutraloaf =

Food served in prisons for additional nutrients

- Alternative names: Meal Loaf, prison loaf, disciplinary loaf, food loaf, lockup loaf, confinement loaf, seg loaf, grue, special management meal, vomit loaf, punishment loaf, the loaf
- Type: Meal
- Course: Main
- Place of origin: United States
- Serving temperature: Room temperature

Nutraloaf, also known as meal loaf, prison loaf, disciplinary loaf, food loaf, lockup loaf, confinement loaf, seg loaf, warden burger, grue, bran bar, or special management meal, is food served in prisons in the United States, and formerly in Canada, and may be served to inmates who have misbehaved, abused food, or inflicted harm upon themselves or others. It is similar to meatloaf in texture but has a wider variety of ingredients. Prison loaf is usually bland and relatively unpleasant, but proponents argue that nutraloaf provides enough nutrition to keep prisoners healthy by providing nutrients and protein.

== Preparation ==
There are many recipes that include a range of foods, from vegetables, fruit, meat, and bread or other grains. The ingredients are blended and baked into a solid loaf. One version of the loaf is made from a mixture of ingredients that include ground beef, vegetables, beans, and bread crumbs. Other versions include mechanically separated poultry and "dairy blend".

== Legality ==
Nutraloaf is served as a utilitarian, unappetizing meal to prisoners, allowing for basic nutrient and vitamin quotas to be met, often as a punishment. The overall legality of forced sustenance based on nutraloafs has been questioned, with some considering it to be a human rights violation.

Lawsuits regarding nutraloaf have taken place in multiple US states. In March 2008, prisoners brought a case before the Vermont Supreme Court, arguing that since Vermont state law does not allow food to be used as punishment, nutraloaf must be removed from the menu. The Vermont Supreme Court held that the nutraloaf and water diet constitutes punishment as it was designed to be unappetizing and required a hearing prior to it being served to prisoners. Other state courts in Illinois, New York, and West Virginia have upheld nutraloaf against 8th Amendment challenges over claims that it constituted cruel and unusual punishment.

Nutraloaf's usage has generally been upheld in federal courts, with rulings in favor of nutraloaf's usage from the 8th and 9th Circuit courts. A similar food item was mentioned by the U.S. Supreme Court in 1978 in Hutto v. Finney while ruling that conditions in the Arkansas penal system constituted cruel and unusual punishment. Among other complaints, prisoners reported being fed "grue", described as "a substance created by mashing meat, potatoes, oleomargarine, syrup, vegetables, eggs, and seasoning into a paste and baking the mixture in a pan". The majority opinion delivered by Justice John Paul Stevens upheld an opinion from the 8th Circuit Court that the grue diet be discontinued. In April 2010, Sheriff Joe Arpaio of Maricopa County, Arizona won a federal judgment in favor of the constitutionality of nutraloaf. In Gordon v. Barnett, the District Court for the Western District of Washington ruled that although it was not cruel and unusual, nutraloaf is a punishment and that prisoners are entitled to a due process hearing before being subjected to it.

The standards of the American Correctional Association, which accredits prisons, discourage the use of food as a disciplinary measure, but adherence to the organization's food standards is voluntary. Denying inmates food as punishment has been found to be unconstitutional by the courts, but because the loaf is generally nutritionally complete, it is sometimes justified as a "dietary adjustment" rather than a denial of proper meals.

As of 2016, California, New York, Massachusetts, and Minnesota have banned serving nutraloaf to inmates.

== See also ==
- Gruel
- Hardtack, hard bread of military and naval use
- Horsebread, a European bread eaten by the poor in the Middle Ages
- Humanitarian daily ration
- Kongbap, a staple in Korean prisons, various mixtures of rice, grains, peas, and beans
- Pemmican
- List of diets
