= Stater Bros. =

American supermarket chain in California

Stater Bros. Markets
- Type: Private
- Industry: Grocery store
- Founded: August 17, 1936; 90 years ago Yucaipa, California, U.S.
- Founders: Cleo Stater; Leo Stater
- Headquarters: 301 S. Tippecanoe Ave., San Bernardino, California, U.S.
- Number of locations: 171 stores throughout Southern California, primarily in the Inland Empire (San Bernardino and Riverside Counties)
- Key people: Pete Van Helden (CEO); Greg McNiff (President)
- Products: Bakery, dairy, deli, floral, frozen foods, general grocery, liquor, meat, produce, seafood, snacks
- Revenue: US$4.2 billion (2015)
- Number of employees: 18,000
- Parent: La Cadena Investments
- Website: staterbros.com

Stater Bros. Markets is a privately held supermarket chain, based in San Bernardino, California, with 171 stores in Southern California. It was founded in Yucaipa, California, on August 17, 1936, by twin brothers Cleo and Leo Stater when they purchased the market owned by Cleo's boss, W. A. Davis, with a $600 down payment ($13,921 in 2025 dollars). Cleo recalled to the Inland Empire Business Press in 1998, that the owner of the market across the street from Davis' gave him the other $300 to make the full down payment. Stater Bros. went public in 1964; Cleo, Leo, and their brother Lavoy sold their interests to the now-defunct Long Beach–based Petrolane Gas Service in 1968. The chain has been owned fully by Stater Bros. Holdings, a subsidiary of La Cadena Investments, owned by Stater's late chairman, president and CEO, Jack H. Brown, since 1986.

In 1999, Stater bought 43 plus one future Albertsons and Lucky supermarkets during Albertsons' merger with American Stores. This acquisition expanded Stater into new areas, including the Antelope Valley and San Diego County. It entered the Fortune 500 for the first time in 2006 at #493, the first notable Inland Empire–based company to do so. In 2006, the headquarters began construction of a 2,000,000-square-foot (190,000 m^{2}) facility at San Bernardino International Airport (formerly Norton Air Force Base) from its former location on the Colton–Grand Terrace border. In 2018, Stater sold its SuperRX pharmacy division to CVS.

== Stores ==
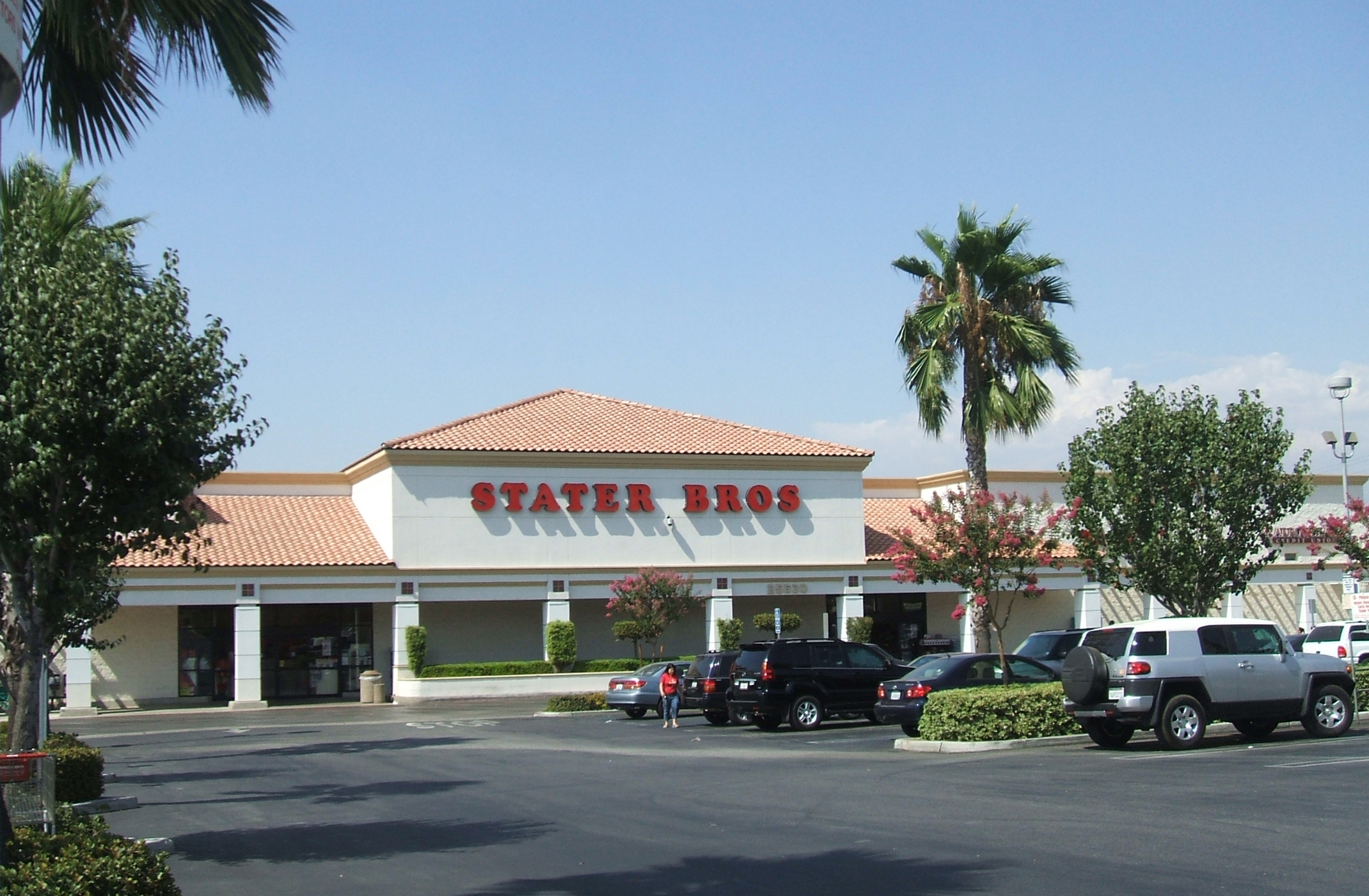
Stater Bros. Market in Loma Linda, California

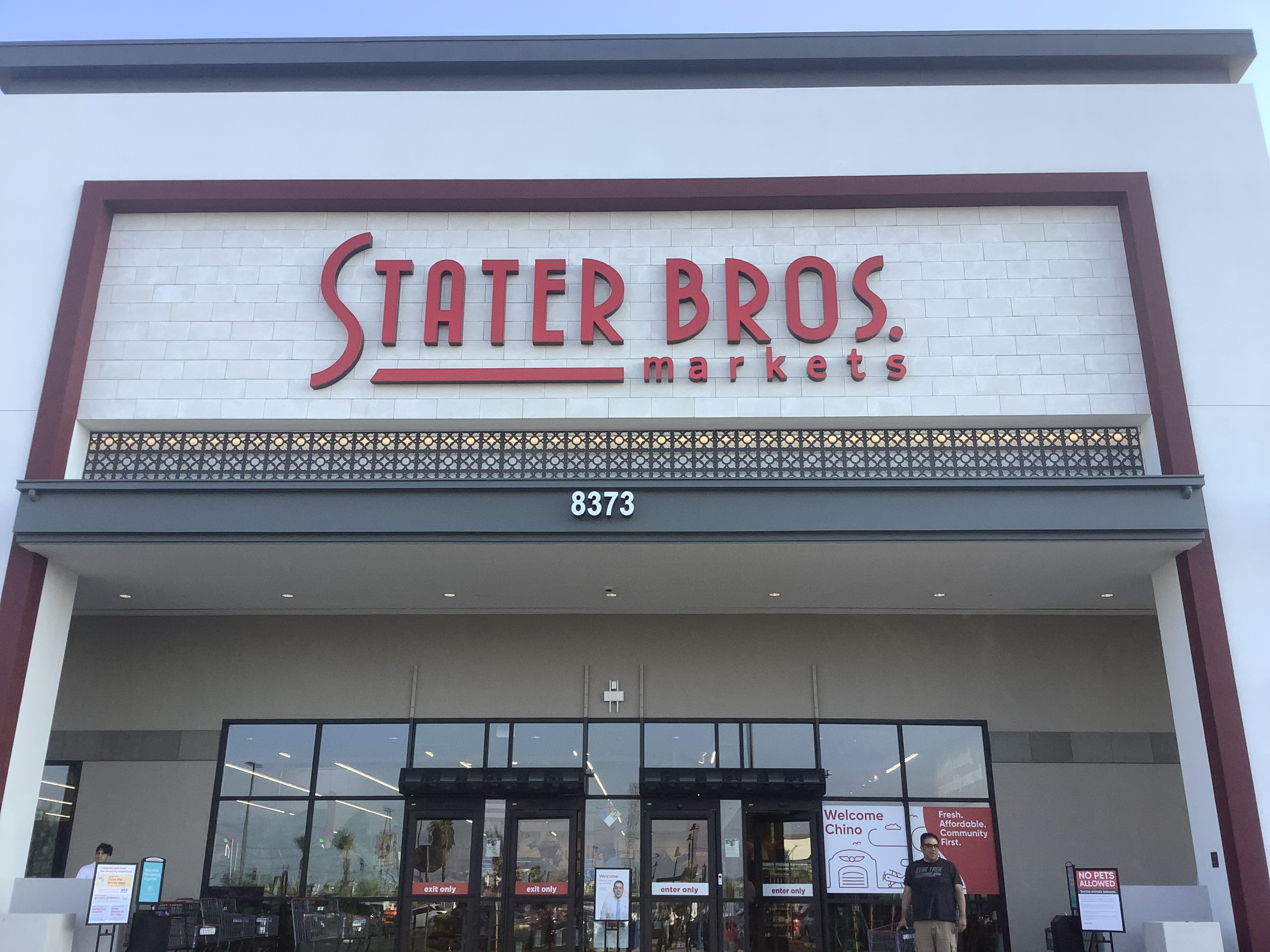
A newer Stater Bros. Market in Chino, California, shortly after its opening in 2023

Throughout its Inland Empire home turf, Stater Bros. stores are concentrated heavily throughout San Bernardino and Riverside counties in Southern California. The chain also has a presence throughout Orange County.

In Los Angeles County, Stater Bros. stores are mainly in communities east of the Long Beach Freeway (I-710) and in communities connected by the Antelope Valley Freeway (SR 14) from Santa Clarita to Lancaster. Stater Bros. also has stores in northern areas of San Diego County generally located between the Ted Williams Parkway (SR 56) and the San Luis Rey Mission Expressway (SR 76) from Oceanside to Ramona. There is also one store in Ventura County, located in Simi Valley. Also, there are two stores in eastern Kern County, located in Ridgecrest and Mojave.

== Management ==
Jack H. Brown joined Stater Bros. in 1981 as the company's president. He was chief executive and president for 35 years. In January 2016, Pete Van Helden was appointed president and chief executive, and Brown became executive chairman. Brown died on November 13, 2016. On December 12, former CFO Phillip J. Smith was elected chairman. Smith was also elected chairman, president and CEO of Stater Bros. Holdings.

== Slogans ==
For many years, Stater Bros. Markets did not have an official corporate slogan. The unofficial phrase was "It's our meat that made us famous." In the early 1990s, "The Eco-Friendly Leader in the Heartland" was introduced as the official slogan, which was later changed to "The Low-Priced Leader in Your Hometown", then supplanted by an unofficial slogan "An American Tradition To Serve Your Family Well". As of 2006, the slogan had been replaced with a lengthy phrase with an emphasis on rhymed words. Found on almost every single plastic bag and VHS tape: "Lowering Prices Everyday to Help You Save on What You Pay!" Currently, the slogan is "Fresh. Affordable. Community First.”

== Route 66 Rendezvous ==
Since 1990, Stater Bros. has hosted the annual Stater Bros. U.S. Route 66 Rendezvous classic car cruise. However, because of bankruptcy of the city of San Bernardino in 2012, the event was cancelled until further notice. In 2014, San Bernardino hosted an alternative show, "Rendezvous Back to Route 66".
