= Slanguage (artist collective) =

Art group

Slanguage is an exhibition space and artist collective in Wilmington, Los Angeles, California founded by Mario Ybarra Jr., Juan Capistan and Karla Diaz in 2002. Slanguage works with community artists, curators and historians on projects and workshops. Slanguage describes its art-making practice as a "three pronged approach" including "education, community-building, and interactive exhibitions."

Slanguage divides its space between experiments with media and ideas, and public performances and exhibitions. The New York Times cited Slanguage as an example of an "ever more important" type of exhibition space that provides a forum for work "uncongenial to an increasingly conservative art establishment" and for the work of students graduating from art schools "in numbers the commercial gallery system cannot begin to absorb."

From September through November, 2009, Slanguage was the resident artist group with The Museum of Contemporary Art, Los Angeles, as part of MOCA's Engagement Party program. Other Slanguage projects include Sweeney Tate, a 2007 art installation at Tate Modern, and The Peacock Doesn't See Its Own Ass/Let's Twitch Again: Operation Bird Watching in London, for the Serpentine Gallery's Uncertain States of America exhibition in 2007.
