= List of avant-garde films of the 1990s =

This is a list of avant-garde and experimental films released in the 1990s.

Title	Director	Cast	Country	Notes
1990
A Walk	Jonas Mekas	Jonas Mekas	United States	58 mins, Color
Absurd	John Maybury		United Kingdom	
Archangel	Guy Maddin	Kyle McCulloch, Kathy Marykuca, Sarah Neville	Canada	
Babylon Series #2	Stan Brakhage		United States	Part of the Babylon Series
Babylon Series #3	Stan Brakhage		United States	Part of the Babylon Series
Bilokacija	Marina Gržinić, Aina Šmid		Yugoslavia	
City Streaming	Stan Brakhage		United States	
Close-Up (1990 film)	Abbas Kiarostami		Iran	
The Comb	Brothers Quay		United Kingdom	
The Death of Stalinism in Bohemia	Jan Švankmajer		Czech Republic	
The Garden	Derek Jarman	Mark Adley, Spencer Leigh, Tilda Swinton	United Kingdom	
Geography	Breda Beban, Hrvoje Horvatić		Yugoslavia	
Glaze of Cathexis	Stan Brakhage		United States	Part of the Three Hand-Painted Films
How to Live in the German Federal Republic	Harun Farocki		West Germany	
Mob of Angels: Baptism	Jonas Mekas	Layne Redmond	United States	61 mins, Color
Moscow Portraits	Marina Gržinić, Aina Šmid		Yugoslavia	
Passage Through: A Ritual	Stan Brakhage		United States	
Scenes from the Life of Andy Warhol: Friendships & Intersections	Jonas Mekas	Andy Warhol, John Cale, Allen Ginsberg, Mick Jagger, John F. Kennedy, Jr., John Lennon, Gerard Malanga, Sterling Morrison, Nico, Yoko Ono, Lou Reed, Barbara Rubin, Edie Sedgwick, Dennis Hopper	United States	36 mins, Color
Singapore Sling	Nikos Nikolaidis	Meredyth Herold, Panos Thanassoulis, Michele Valley	Greece	
Tenamonya Connection	Masashi Yamamoto	Reiko Arai	Japan; Hong Kong	
The Thatch of Night	Stan Brakhage		United States	
Vision of the Fire Tree	Stan Brakhage		United States	
Visions in Meditation #3: Plato's Cave	Stan Brakhage		United States	Part of the Visions in Meditation Cycle
Visions in Meditation #4: D.H. Lawrence	Stan Brakhage		United States	Part of the Visions in Meditation Cycle
You Be Mother	Sarah Pucill		United Kingdom	
1991
Agnus Dei Kinder Synapse	Stan Brakhage		United States	
A Child's Garden and the Serious Sea	Stan Brakhage		United States	
Carl G. Jung by Jerome Hill or Lapis Philosophorum	Jonas Mekas, Jerome Hill	Jerome Hill, Carl Jung	United States	29 mins, B&W
Christ Mass Sex Dance	Stan Brakhage		United States	
Delicacies of Molten Horror Synapse	Stan Brakhage		United States	
Delicatessen	Marc Caro, Jean-Pierre Jeunet	Dominique Pinon, Marie-Laure Dougnac, Jean-Claude Dreyfus	France	Surrealist film
Edward II	Derek Jarman	Tilda Swinton, Nigel Terry, Andrew Tiernan, Steven Waddington	United Kingdom	
Europa	Lars von Trier	Jean-Marc Barr, Barbara Sukowa, Ernst-Hugo Järegård	Denmark	
Flaming Ears	Ursula Pürrer, Hans A. Scheirl, Dietmar Schipek		Austria	
Franz Kafka	Piotr Dumala		Poland	
Naked Lunch	David Cronenberg	Peter Weller, Judy Davis, Ian Holm	Canada; UK	
Prospero's Books	Peter Greenaway	John Gielgud, Michael Clark, Michel Blanc	UK; France	
Quartet Number One	Jonas Mekas	Jonas Mekas, Ken Jacobs, Flo Jacobs	United States	8 mins, Color
Traveling at Night	Chris Kraus		United States	
Tribulation 99: Alien Anomalies Under America	Craig Baldwin		United States	
1992
Acidfilmda	Metamkine		France	
The Bride, The Bachelors – Even	Sanja Iveković, Dalibor Martinis		Yugoslavia	
A Cage of Flame	Kayla Parker		United Kingdom	
Crack Glass Eulogy	Stan Brakhage		United States	
The Education of Sebastian or Egypt Regained	Jonas Mekas	Jean Houston	United States	228 mins, Color
Falling Lessons	Amy Halpern		United States	
Fatima's Letter	Alia Syed		United Kingdom	
I am My Own Woman	Rosa von Praunheim	Charlotte von Mahlsdorf	Germany	
Interpolations I-V	Stan Brakhage		United States	
The Last Bolshevik	Chris Marker		France	
Manufacturing Consent: Noam Chomsky and the Media	Mark Achbar, Peter Wintonick	Noam Chomsky	United States	
Jidlo	Jan Švankmajer		Czech Republic	
Side/Walk/Shuttle	Ernie Gehr		United States	
Untitled (For Marilyn)	Stan Brakhage		United States	
Videograms of a Revolution	Haron Farocki, Andrei Ujică		Romania; Germany	
Wittgenstein Tractatus	Péter Forgács		Hungary	
Zefiro Torna or Scenes from the Life of George Maciunas (Fluxus)	Jonas Mekas	George Maciunas	United States	35 mins
1993
Anamorphosis, or De Artificiali Perspectiva	Brothers Quay		United Kingdom	
Artwar	Jeff Keen		United Kingdom	
The Attendant	Isaac Julien		United Kingdom	
Autumnal	Stan Brakhage		United States	
Blossom-Gift/Favor	Stan Brakhage		United States	
Blue	Derek Jarman	John Quentin, Nigel Terry, Derek Jarman	United Kingdom	
Boulder Blues and Pearls and...	Stan Brakhage		United States	
Careful	Guy Maddin	Kyle McCulloch, Gosia Dobrowolska, Sarah Neville	Canada	
Ephemeral Solidity	Stan Brakhage		United States	
Eyewitnesses in Foreign Countries	Gustav Deutsch, Mostafa Tabbou		Austria; Morocco	
Fast Trip, Long Drop	Gregg Bordowitz		United States	
Franz Kafka's It's a Wonderful Life	Peter Capaldi	Richard E. Grant	United Kingdom	
Gender Troublemakers	Xantha Philippa Mackay, Mirha-Soleil Ross		Canada	
The Harrowing	Stan Brakhage		United States	
Passage à l'acte	Martin Arnold		Austria	
Project Eleonara	Rühm T		Estonia	
Smoking/No Smoking	Alain Resnais	Sabine Azéma, Pierre Arditi	France; Italy	
Stellar	Stan Brakhage		United States	
Stille Nacht II: Tales from the Vienna Woods	Brothers Quay		United Kingdom	
Stille Nacht IV: Can't Go Wrong Without You	Brothers Quay		United Kingdom	
Study in Color and Black and White	Stan Brakhage		United States	
Three Homerics	Stan Brakhage		United States	
Tryst Haunt	Stan Brakhage		United States	
Wittgenstein	Derek Jarman	Karl Johnson, Michael Gough, Tilda Swinton	United Kingdom	
1994
A.13 (short)	William Raban		United Kingdom	
Black Ice	Stan Brakhage		United States	
Cannot Exist	Stan Brakhage		United States	
Cannot Not Exist	Stan Brakhage		United States	
Chartres Series	Stan Brakhage		United States	
Elementary Phrases	Stan Brakhage		United States	
Faust	Jan Švankmajer	Petr Čepek	Czech Republic; France; United Kingdom; Germany	
From: First Hymn to the Night - Novalis	Stan Brakhage		United States	
London	Patrick Keiller	Paul Scofield	United Kingdom	
Luna 10	Marina Gržinić, Aina Šmid		Slovenia	
The Mammals of Victoria	Stan Brakhage		United States	
Naughts	Stan Brakhage		United States	
Postcards from America	Elizabeth Gill, Chris Hoover, Steve McLean	James Lyons, Michael Tighe, Olmo Tighe	United States	
Roy Cohn/Jack Smith	Ron Vawter, Anita Thacher, Jill Godmilow	Coco McPherson, Ron Vawter	United States	
Sátántángo	Béla Tarr	Putyi Horváth, László Lugossy, Mihály Víg	Hungary	
Seduction of a Cyborg	Lynn Hershman Leeson		United States	
Vanya on 42nd Street	Louis Malle	Wallace Shawn, Larry Pine, Andre Gregory	United States	
What She Wants	Ruth Lingford		United Kingdom	
Why I Never Became a Dancer	Tracey Emin		United Kingdom	
1995
Above the Lake	Dmitrii Frolov	Peter Kremis, Romil Rachev, Natalya Surkova	Russia	
A3 – Apatija, AIDS in Antarktika	Marina Gržinić, Aina Šmid		Slovenia	
The 'b' Series	Stan Brakhage		United States	
Cremaster 1	Matthew Barney		United States	
Earthen Aerie	Stan Brakhage		United States	
I...	Stan Brakhage		United States	
I Take These Truths	Stan Brakhage		United States	
If 6 was 9	Eija-Liisa Ahtila		Finland	
Imperfect Three-Image Films	Jonas Mekas		United States	6 mins, Color
In Consideration of Pompeii	Stan Brakhage		United States	
JLG/JLG: Self-Portrait in December	Jean-Luc Godard		France	
The Lost Films	Stan Brakhage		United States	
Lumière and Company	Various directors		France; Spain; Sweden	
Memories of Frankenstein	Jonas Mekas	The Living Theatre	France	95 mins, Black & White
Neurosia: Fifty Years of Perversion	Rosa von Praunheim		Germany	
On My Way to Fujiyama I met..	Jonas Mekas		United States	25 mins, Color
Out of the Present	Andrei Ujică		Romania	
Paranoia Corridor	Stan Brakhage		United States	
Sonic Outlaws	Craig Baldwin		United States	
Spring Cycle	Stan Brakhage		United States	
Tokyo Fist	Shinya Tsukamoto	Shinya Tsukamoto, Kaori Fujii, Kohji Tsukamoto	Japan	
We Hold These	Stan Brakhage		United States	
1996
Beautiful Funerals	Stan Brakhage		United States	
Blue Value	Stan Brakhage		United States	
Breaking the Waves	Lars von Trier	Emily Watson	Denmark	
Cinema Is Not 100 Years Old	Jonas Mekas		United States	4 mins, Color
Comingled Containers	Stan Brakhage		United States	
Concrescence	Stan Brakhage		United States	
Conspirators of Pleasure	Jan Švankmajer	Petr Meissel	Switzerland; United Kingdom; Czech Republic	
Crash	David Cronenberg	James Spader, Deborah Kara Unger, Elias Koteas, Holly Hunter, Rosanna Arquette	Canada; United Kingdom	
The Film of Her	Bill Morrison		United Kingdom	
For Ever Mozart	Jean-Luc Godard	Madeleine Assas, Bérangère Allaux	Switzerland; France	
The Fur of Home	Stan Brakhage		United States	
Gallivant	Andrew Kötting		United Kingdom	
Georgetown Loop	Ken Jacobs		United States	
Happy-End	Peter Tscherkassky		Austria	
Hide and Seek	Su Friedrich		United States	
Irma Vep	Olivier Assayas	Maggie Cheung, Jean-Pierre Léaud	France	
Passagen	Lisl Ponger		Austria	
The Pillow Book	Peter Greenaway	Vivian Wu, Ewan McGregor, Yoshi Oida	United Kingdom; France; Netherlands	
Polite Madness	Stan Brakhage		United States	
Prelude 1	Stan Brakhage		United States	
Prelude 2	Stan Brakhage		United States	
Prelude 3	Stan Brakhage		United States	
Prelude 4	Stan Brakhage		United States	
Prelude 5	Stan Brakhage		United States	
Prelude 6	Stan Brakhage		United States	
Prelude 7	Stan Brakhage		United States	
Prelude 8	Stan Brakhage		United States	
Prelude 9	Stan Brakhage		United States	
Prelude 10	Stan Brakhage		United States	
Prelude 11	Stan Brakhage		United States	
Prelude 12	Stan Brakhage		United States	
Prelude 13	Stan Brakhage		United States	
Prelude 14	Stan Brakhage		United States	
Prelude 15	Stan Brakhage		United States	
Prelude 16	Stan Brakhage		United States	
Prelude 17	Stan Brakhage		United States	
Prelude 18	Stan Brakhage		United States	
Prelude 19	Stan Brakhage		United States	
Prelude 20	Stan Brakhage		United States	
Prelude 21	Stan Brakhage		United States	
Prelude 22	Stan Brakhage		United States	
Prelude 23	Stan Brakhage		United States	
Prelude 24	Stan Brakhage		United States	
Sexual Saga	Stan Brakhage		United States	
Shockingly Hot	Stan Brakhage		United States	
Song of the Salamander	Jonas Mekas	Oona Mekas	United States	10 mins, Color
Terminus for You	Nicolas Rey		France	
Through Wounded Eyes	Stan Brakhage		United States	
Triste	Nathaniel Dorsky		United States	
Two Found Objects of Charles Boultenhouse	Stan Brakhage		United States	
Village of Dreams	Yōichi Higashi	Mieko Harada, Kaneko Iwasaki, Hosei Komatsu	Japan	
1997
Astor Place	Eve Heller		United States	
Birth of a Nation	Jonas Mekas	Over 160 artists	United States	85 mins, Color
The Cat of the Worm's Green Realm	Stan Brakhage		United States	
Divertimento	Stan Brakhage		United States	
Film Ist.	Gustav Deutsch		Austria	
Gummo	Harmony Korine	Jacob Reynolds, Nick Sutton, Jacob Sewell	United States	
Happy Birthday to John	Jonas Mekas	John Lennon, Yoko Ono, Ringo Starr, Andy Warhol, Allen Ginsberg, Shirley Clarke, Miles Davis, Paul Krassner, George Maciunas	United States	24 mins, Color
How I Learned to Stop Worring and Love Ariel Sharon	Avi Mograbi		Israel	
Last Hymn to the Night - Novalis	Stan Brakhage		United States	
Letters from Nowhere	Jonas Mekas	Jonas Mekas	United States	75 mins, Color
Level Five	Chris Marker	Catherine Belkhodja	France	
Lost Highway	David Lynch	Bill Pullman, Patricia Arquette, Balthazar Getty	United States	Surrealist film
Mein Herz – niemandem!	Helma Sanders-Brahms	Lena Stolze, Thomas Ruffer, René Schubert	Germany	
The Mirror	Jafar Panahi	Mina Mohammad Khani, Kadem Mojdehi	Iran	
Nam June Paik’s Piano Piece	Jonas Mekas	Nam June Paik	United States	6 mins, Color
Post-socializem + Retroavantgarde + IRWIN	Marina Gržinić, Aina Šmid		Slovenia	
Robinson in Space	Patrick Keiller	Paul Scofield	United Kingdom	
Scars	James Herbert	Carter Davis, Alexandra Rosetti	United States	
Scenes from Allen’s Last Three Days on Earth as a Spirit	Jonas Mekas	Allen Ginsberg, Gregory Corso, Jonas Mekas, Patti Smith, Amiri Baraka	United States	67 mins, Color and Black & White
Self Song/Death Song	Stan Brakhage		United States	
Still Life	Harun Farocki		Germany	
Story of I	Jo Ann Kaplan		United Kingdom	
Today	Eija-Liisa Ahtila		Finland	
Uncut	John Greyson	Matthew Ferguson, Michael Achtman, Damon D'Oliveira	Canada	
Yggdrasill: Whose Roots Are Stars In The Human Mind	Stan Brakhage		United States	
1998
... Reel Five	Stan Brakhage		United States	
... Reel Four	Stan Brakhage		United States	
... Reel One	Stan Brakhage		United States	
... Reel Three	Stan Brakhage		United States	
... Reel Two	Stan Brakhage		United States	
Alone. Life Wastes Andy Hardy	Martin Arnold		Austria	
L'Arrivée	Peter Tscherkassky		Austria	
Dandy Dust	Hans A. Scheirl	Hans Scheirl, Leonora Rogers-Wright, Suzie Krüger, Tres Trash Temperilli	Austria	
Fear and Loathing in Las Vegas	Terry Gilliam	Johnny Depp, Benicio del Toro, Craig Bierko	United States	
Female Mystique and Spare Leaves	Stan Brakhage		United States	
Festen	Thomas Vinterberg	Trine Dyrholm, Ulrich Thomsen, Henning Moritzen, Thomas Bo Larsen, Birthe Neumann, Paprika Steen	Denmark	
Histoire(s) du cinéma	Jean-Luc Godard		France	
His-story	Deimantas Narkevičius		Lithuania	
The Idiots	Lars von Trier	Jens Albinus, Anne Louise Hassing, Bodil Jørgensen, Troels Lyby, Louise Meirtiz	Denmark	
Money, A Mythology of Darkness	Vassilis Mazomenos		Greece	
Patti Smith at Anthology Film Archives Febr. 19, 1998	Jonas Mekas	Patti Smith, Lou Reed	United States	5 mins, Color, The First 40 Cycle
Pi	Darren Aronofsky	Sean Gullette, Mark Margolis, Ben Shenkman	United States	
Shulie	Elisabeth Subrin		United States	
Song of Avignon	Jonas Mekas	Angus MacLise, Jonas Mekas	United States	9 mins, Color, The First 40 Cycle
Troika	Jennifer Montgomery	Jenny Bass, Lev Shekhtman, Marina Shterenberg	United States	
Variations	Nathaniel Dorsky		United States	
1999
Alternating Currents	Stan Brakhage, Phil Solomon		United States	
Beau travail	Claire Denis	Denis Lavant, Michel Subor	France	
The Birds of Paradise	Stan Brakhage		United States	
Cloud Chamber	Stan Brakhage		United States	
Consolation Service	Eija-Liisa Ahtila		Finland	
Coupling	Stan Brakhage		United States	
Cremaster 5	Matthew Barney	Norman Mailer, Matthew Barney, Lauren Pine	United States	
Cricket Requiem	Stan Brakhage		United States	
Dancing with Hydra	Takuji Suzuki		Japan	
The Dark Tower	Stan Brakhage		United States	
E-CLIP-SE	Chris Marker		France	
The Earthsong of the Cricket	Stan Brakhage		United States	
Fiorucci Made Me Hardcore	Mark Leckey		United Kingdom	
Get Ready	Peter Tscherkassky		Austria	
Julien Donkey-Boy	Harmony Korine	Ewen Bremner, Chloë Sevigny, Werner Herzog	United States	
Laboratorium Anthology	Jonas Mekas		United States	100 mins, Color
Letter to John from Jonas	Jonas Mekas	Jonas Mekas	United States	25 mins, Color
The Lion and the Zebra Make God's Raw Jewels	Stan Brakhage		United States	
Outer Space	Peter Tscherkassky		Austria	
Persian Series #1	Stan Brakhage		United States	
Persian Series #2	Stan Brakhage		United States	
Persian Series #3	Stan Brakhage		United States	
Persian Series #4	Stan Brakhage		United States	
Persian Series #5	Stan Brakhage		United States	
See You in Hell, My Darling	Nikos Nikolaidis	Vicky Harris, Valeria Christodoulidou, Paschalis Tsarouhas	Greece	
Stately Mansions Did Decree	Stan Brakhage		United States	
Stereoscope	William Kentridge		South Africa	
This Side of Paradise	Jonas Mekas	Jacqueline Kennedy, John F. Kennedy, Jr., Caroline Kennedy, Lee Radziwill, Andy Warhol	United States	35 mins, Color
Worm and Web Love	Stan Brakhage		United States	
