= Found footage (appropriation) =

Use of footage as a found object

In filmmaking, found footage is the use of footage as a found object, appropriated for use in collage films, documentary films, mockumentary films and other works.

== Use in commercial film ==
Often, fictional films imitate this style in order to increase their authenticity, especially the mockumentary genre. In the dramatized and embellished pseudo-documentary film F for Fake (1973), director Orson Welles borrows all shots of main subject Elmyr de Hory from a BBC documentary, rather than fabricating the footage himself.

Stuart Cooper's Overlord uses stock footage of the landing on Normandy during World War II to increase realism. The footage was obtained from the Imperial War Museum in the UK. Other parts of the film were shot by Cooper; however, he used old World War II-era film stock with World War II-era lenses.

== Music video and VJing ==
A certain style of music video makes extensive use of found footage, mostly found on TV, like news, documentaries, old (and odd) films etc. The forefather of found footage music videos was artist Bruce Conner who screened Cosmic Ray in 1961. Prominent examples are videos of bands such as Public Enemy and Coldcut. The latter also project video material during their stage show, which includes live mixing of video footage. Artists such as Vicki Bennett, also known as People Like Us, or the video artist Kasumi with the film Shockwaves, use Creative Commons archives such as the Prelinger Archives.

== Practitioners ==
- Anti-Banality Union
- Martin Arnold
- Craig Baldwin
- Dara Birnbaum
- Abigail Child
- Bruce Conner
- Joseph Cornell
- William Farley
- Federica Foglia
- Péter Forgács
- Barbara Hammer
- Ken Jacobs
- Svetlana Kopystiansky
- Igor Kopystiansky
- Brett Morgen85 decibel Monks
- Matthias Müller
- Dennis Nyback
- Vivian Ostrovsky
- Paul Pfeiffer
- Rick Prelinger
- Luther Price
- Phil Solomon
- Chick Strand
- System D-128
- Peter Tscherkassky
- René Viénet

== See also ==
- Experimental film
- Found Footage Festival
- Mashup (video)
- Montage (filmmaking)
- Vietnam in HD, in which thirteen Americans retell their stories in the Vietnam War paired with found footage from the battlefield
- VJing
- WWII in HD, in which twelve American service members retell their stories in World War II paired with found footage from the battlefield
- Remix culture
