= Beatrix*JAR =

American artists

Beatrix*JAR is a Minneapolis-based artistic collective of Bianca Janine Pettis (born 1973) and Jacob Aaron Roske (born 1977). Formed in 2003, the pair works across multiple artistic disciplines. Their eagerness to try anything paired with their “Yes…and “ approach to art making has led them to creating work in Video, Sound Art, Performance, Visual Art and Theater. Beatrix*Jar also works as Artist/Educators having spent numerous years leading hands-on Circuit Bending Workshops paired with Live Sound Collage Performances, Artist Residencies, Sound Art Festivals and Community Engagement Events. As Visual Artists Beatrix*Jar has created Murals, Art Exhibitions and fabric birds and cats they call Art Pets.

== History ==
Bianca Janine Pettis was born in Denver, Colorado. As a child she lived in Los Angeles and Houston finally settling down in Charlotte, North Carolina, with her mother Sally, a painter.

Pettis became involved in theatre during high school and went on to perform with "Focus Teen Family Theater", a group sponsored by the Charlotte chapter of Planned Parenthood dedicated to performing teen issues like peer pressure, college and bullying. As the AIDS Crisis started to become an issue Pettis went on to perform with "Focus on AIDS", also sponsored by Planned Parenthood but dedicated to educating the public about the AIDS crisis.

Pettis went on to study theater at the North Carolina School of the Arts Pre-Professional Acting Program in Winston Salem, North Carolina, and she received a BA in Theater from Antioch College in Yellow Springs, Ohio. During College, Pettis interested in creating solo performances and writing plays, took an internship at the Minneapolis based Playwrights' Center. After college she moved to Minneapolis where she worked for a number of years as a professional actress and went on to write and perform numerous solo performance pieces.

In 2003, after deciding to take a break from acting, she enrolled in a Film and Video Classes at the Minneapolis Community and Technical College, where she met her partner Jacob Aaron Roske eventually forming Beatrix*Jar. In 2017, Pettis received an MFA in Fine Art from the University of Minnesota.

Jacob Aaron Roske as born in St. Louis Park, Minnesota. He grew up in a house that constantly streamed the AM Radio which he cites as inspiration for his sonic experiments. Roske received an AA in Sound Art and an AA in Video Art from the Minneapolis Community and Technical College. He went on to receive a BA in Fine Art from the University of Minnesota.

From 2007 to 2011, Beatrix*JAR traveled extensively demonstrating do-it-yourself electronics and experimentation with over 250 conceptual sound art performances and hands-on circuit bending workshops. Their work was featured in art museums, night clubs, universities, libraries, hacker spaces, and art galleries all over the United States including the Walker Art Center in Minneapolis, the Wexner Center for the Arts in Columbus, Ohio, The Andy Warhol Museum in Pittsburgh, the Museum of Contemporary Art San Diego, the American Visionary Art Museum in Baltimore, and the High Museum of Art in Atlanta.

In 2010 Beatrix*JAR received a Bush Foundation fellowship for Media Arts. Roske and Pettis took a two-year creative sabbatical in San Diego. They began creating fabric birds and cats that they call Art Pets. After about two years, the duo returned to Minnesota. In 2012 they briefly ran a pop-up gallery called the Beatrix*JAR Open Experimental Studio, where they hosted live performances, circuit bending workshops, and sewing lessons.

Inspired by the audio works of John Cage and the paintings of Jean-Michel Basquiat, in 2013 Beatrix*JAR started adding Audio Playgrounds to their repertoire. Audio Playgrounds breakdown the wall between performer and observer by allowing audiences to make the sounds.

In 2020, Beatrix*Jar premiered a radio program called The Beatrix*Jar Show. The duo was also commissioned by the Walker Art Center to create musical compositions for Bruce Baille's short "Tung" and Mark Bradford's video short "Practice". Beatrix*Jar also created a large scale mural called "Bird Enterprise Zone" for the St. Paul neighborhood Creative Enterprise Zone.

== Performance style ==
Beatrix*Jar is most noted for their unique performances and non-traditional approach to music, the band draws its inspiration from AM Radios paired with Flash Cameras, Modified Children's Toys, Samples and electronic beats. Beatrix*JAR self-released four albums: I Love You Talk Bird (2005), Golden Fuzz (2007), Art*Star (2010), and Hot*mess (2019).

"What sets Beatrix*JAR apart from these various media manipulators is its particular method of music generation -- Roske and girlfriend Bianca Pettis rely for their sound sources on rearranging the innards of electronic devices. Onstage, their setup fits entirely on a small table: an AM radio, a flash camera, four Speak and Spells (or Reads or Maths), a Casio keyboard, a Yamaha drumbox, and a Denon CDJ, scratched by Pettis (a.k.a Beatrix)." - Manny Thiener, Pittsburgh Daily
