= Thorn Road =

Former road from Oakland to timberlands

Thorn Road was a toll road from Oakland, California to the Moraga Valley. A photograph of it appears in a 1951 edition of the Southern California Historical Quarterly. It was built by Hiram Thorn and succeeded Prince's Road. It became Thornhill Drive.

Prince's Road was another lumbering road in the area and was abandoned. Thorn had a sawmill in the Moraga Redwoods near Pinehurst, California. The road was begun in 1853 and followed the San Leandro Creek watershed. Part of it is now in the Huckleberry Botanic Regional Preserve.

== See also ==
- Canyon, California
