= Fake Fruit Factory =

- Directed by: Chick Strand
- Distributed by: Canyon Cinema
- Release date: 1986
- Running time: 22 minutes
- Country: United States
- Language: Spanish

Fake Fruit Factory is a 1986 American experimental documentary film by Chick Strand.

== Summary ==
The film documents women making artificial fruits and vegetables in a small Mexican factory owned by a white American man. The footage mainly focuses on the color and movement involved in the process of manufacturing, and the conversations between the female workers, who mainly discuss men. Later in the film, the workers are shown driving to the beach, where they prepare lunch, relax, and continue to gossip. In the film's brief epilogue, it is revealed that the owner's Mexican wife later took over ownership of the factory after her husband ran off with a cocktail waitress.

== Legacy ==
In 2011, Fake Fruit Factory was selected for preservation in the United States National Film Registry by the Library of Congress, deemed a "culturally, historically, or aesthetically significant" film.

== Availability ==
Fake Fruit Factory appears on the DVD Treasures IV: American Avant-Garde Film, 1947-1986.
