= Luther Price =

American experimental filmmaker (1962–2020)

Luther Price (pseudonym) (January 26, 1962 – June 13, 2020) was an experimental filmmaker and visual artist.

== Biography ==
Price was born in Marlborough, Massachusetts in 1962. He received a BFA in Sculpture and Media/Performing Arts from Massachusetts College of Art and Design, where he studied with Saul Levine. Before taking the name Luther Price, he worked under various pseudonyms, including Brigk Aethy, Fag, and Tom Rhoads. While at Massachusetts College of Art and Design, Luther collaborated with students in the Studio for Interrelated Media on many projects including creating events, performance art, music projects and exhibitions. He was an experimental filmmaker whose work has been widely screened in the United States and Europe at such venues as the Museum of Modern Art, the Whitney Museum of American Art, and the San Francisco Cinematheque. He was an adjunct professor at the Massachusetts College of Art and Design and the School of the Museum of Fine Arts at Tufts teaching his popular "Hand-made Films" curriculum.

Price's Super 8mm and 16mm films are usually constructed from found footage and often include controversial subject matter, such as pornography, surgical footage, and psychodramatic performances, as well as physical interventions into the actual material of the film stock. Later in his career he began crafting individual 35mm slides shown on slide projectors. His work was featured prominently in the 2012 Whitney Biennial. Roberta Smith of the New York Times called him "one of the Biennial's stars." Ed Halter selected his Inkblot films as the Best Film of 2011, noting "[his films] struggle through the projector with an unsettlingly existential corporeality." His films are distributed by Canyon Cinema in San Francisco, The Film-Makers' Cooperative in New York, and Light Cone in Paris. He was represented by Callicoon Fine Arts. He died at his home in Revere, Massachusetts on June 13, 2020, at the age of 58.

== Selected works ==
- Green (1988) (as Tom Rhoads) Super 8 mm, color, sound, 36 minutes
- Warm Broth (1988) (as Tom Rhoads) Super 8mm, color, sound, 30 minutes
- Sodom (1989) Super 8 mm, color, sound, 21 minutes
- Clown (1991) Super 8 mm, color, sound, 13 minutes
- Meat (1992) Super 8 mm on video, color, sound, 60 minutes, also a 2-hour performance
- Bottle Can (1993) Super 8 mm, color, sound, 20 minutes
- Eruption Erection (1994) Super 8 mm, color, sound, 10 minutes,
- Jellyfish Sandwich (1994) Super 8 mm, color, sound, 17 minutes
- Run (1994) Super 8 mm, color, sound, 13 minutes
- A. (1994) Super 8 mm, b&w, sound, 60 minutes
- Me Gut No Dog Dog (1994) Super 8 mm, color, sound, 42 minutes
- Meat Situation 04 (1997) Super 8 mm, color, sound, 4 minutes
- Mother (1998–1999) Super 8 mm, color, sound, 25 minutes
- Home (1990–1999) Super 8 mm, b&w, sound, 13 minutes
- Ritual 629 (1990–1999) Super 8 mm, color, sound, 15 minutes
- Recitations (1999) Super 8 mm, color, sound, 10 minutes
- Yellow Goodbye (1999) Super 8 mm, color, sound, 10 minutes
- Meat Blue 03 (1999) Super 8 mm, color, sound
- Res hat ions (2000) Super 8mm, b&w, sound, 10 minutes
- #5, (2000) Super 8mm, color, sound
- I'll Cry Tomorrow, Parts 1 and 2 (2000) Super 8mm, color, sound, 20 minutes
- Dead Ringer (2000) Super 8mm, color, sound, 3 minutes
- A Patch of Green (2004) 16mm, 4 minutes
- Nice Biscotts #2 (2005) 16mm, 10 minutes
- September Song (2005) 16mm, 5 minutes
- Dipping Sause (2005) 16mm, 8 minutes
- Turbulant Blue (2005–6) 16mm, 9 minutes
- Inside Velvet K (2006) 16mm, 10 minutes
- Fancy (2006) 16mm, 12 minutes
- Tamponia (2007) 16mm, 8 minutes
- Suffering Biscuits (2007) 16mm, 20 minutes
- Shelly Winters (2010) 16mm, 11 minutes
- After the Garden: Silking (2010) 16mm, 6 minutes

== Bibliography ==
- Gangitano, Lia; Myles, Eileen (1998), Luther Price: Imitation of Life, New York: Thread Waxing Space, ISBN 1-891027-06-9
- Hansen, James (2013), The Fall of Days: Luther Price's Nine Biscuits (2004-08), Millennium Film Journal, Issue 58, Fall 2013: 124-29
- Jones, William E. (2020), Passages: Luther Price (1962–2020), ArtForum, online
- Price, Luther; Halter, Ed (2023), New Utopia and Light Fracture, Rochester: Visual Studies Workshop Press, ISBN 9780898222128
