= Castro Street (film) =

- Directed by: Bruce Baillie
- Produced by: Bruce Baillie
- Distributed by: Canyon Cinema
- Release date: 1966
- Running time: 10 minutes
- Country: United States
- Language: No dialogue

Castro Street (1966) is a visual nonstory short documentary film directed by Bruce Baillie.

== Summary ==
Inspired by Satie, the film uses the sounds and sights of a city street—in this case, Castro Street near the Standard Oil Refinery in Richmond, California, complete with diesel trains and gas plants—to convey the street's own mood and feel as there is no dialogue in this non-narrative experimental film.

== Legacy ==
In 1992, the film was selected for preservation in the United States National Film Registry by the Library of Congress as being "culturally, historically, or aesthetically significant". The Academy Film Archive preserved Castro Street in 2000.

== See also ==
- List of American films of 1966
- City symphony
