= Betzy =

Betzy is a given name. Notable people with the name include:

- Betzy Akersloot-Berg, Norwegian-born painter in the Netherlands
- Betzy Bromberg, American director, editor, and experimental filmmaker
- Betzy Cuevas, Mexican footballer
- Betzy Holter, Norwegian actress
- Betzy Kjelsberg, Norwegian feminist and politician
- Betzy Madrid, Panamanian model and beauty pageant titleholder

== See also ==
- French corvette Betzy (1793)
