= All My Life (1966 film) =

1966 American experimental short film

- Directed by: Bruce Baillie
- Distributed by: Canyon Cinema
- Release date: 1966
- Running time: 3 minutes
- Country: United States
- Language: English

All My Life is a 1966 American experimental short film directed by Bruce Baillie. It shows a continuous shot of a fence, soundtracked by Ella Fitzgerald's 1936 debut single "All My Life". Film critic P. Adams Sitney identified it as an early example of what he termed structural film.

== Description ==
As the camera pans along the fence, bright red flowers enter the frame.

The film consists of a single shot that begins panning along a picket fence. As the camera continues to pan, red flowers on the fence are seen. The film ends after the camera angles upward to show a horizontal telephone wire and, finally, a blue sky. It uses "All My Life" by Ella Fitzgerald as its soundtrack.

== Production ==
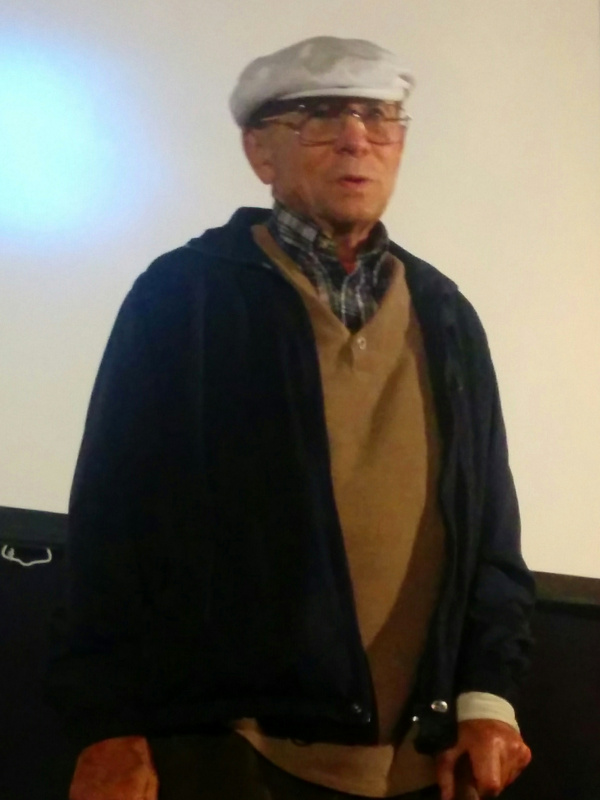
Director Bruce Baillie in 2016

All My Life was shot during a summer trip Baillie took to Caspar, California. Baillie had been admiring the quality of the sunlight, and while driving back down to San Francisco on the second day, he insisted on stopping so he could film. He used a camera with a telephoto lens, set up on a tripod so he could pan and adjust focus at the same time. Having only one roll of outdated Ansco 16 mm film to use, Baillie practiced the timing first and had a friend call out the minutes as they passed. He filmed All My Life as one continuous shot that ended by angling up into the sky.

Baillie had "All My Life" in mind for the soundtrack because it had been playing at Paul Tulley's cabin where they had been staying. The record player there had a potato sack over its speaker, giving it a scratchy sound that Baillie wanted to use. He completed the film at the Morningstar Commune in Sebastopol, California.

== Release ==
The film was released in 1966 and distributed through Canyon Cinema, a cooperative co-founded by Baillie. When a new internegative was created in 1989, retaining the film's vibrant colors was a key concern. The Kodak 7390 stock that Baillie had used for his prints was no longer available, and to replicate the intense red hues of the flowers, preservationists decided against the cyan correction typically used when transferring to the lower-contrast Kodak 7389. It is now part of Anthology Film Archives' Essential Cinema Repertory collection. A digital transfer was made for All My Life's home release in 2013, in a DVD collection of some of Baillie's work.

== Reception and legacy ==
Film critic Manohla Dargis called All My Life "one of the most perfect films that I've ever seen". P. Adams Sitney identified it as an early example of what he termed structural film, in particular for its monomorphic form and its emphasis on the mechanics of filmmaking tools. Filmmaker Chris Welsby remarked that "it has taken me, quite literally, all my life so far to truly appreciate the simple elegant beauty of this cinematic gem. There is nothing in the film that could be changed for the better." Phil Solomon called it "one of the great works of film art". Steve Anker commented that the film's "steady rhythm" and its contrasts between natural and manufactured subjects creates "a rich interplay of color, form, and dimensionality that pivots between a sense of nostalgia and the inevitability of time passing".

Filmmaker Laida Lertxundi cited the camera movement in All My Life as an influence on her 2009 film My Tears Are Dry.
