= Earth 2 =

Earth 2 may refer to:

- Earth 2 (TV series), 1994–1995 American science fiction television series
- Earth II, a 1971 American science fiction television pilot
- Earth II, a 2022 American collage film by the Anti-Banality Union
- Earth 2 (album), 1993 album by drone metal band Earth
- In the fictional universe of DC Comics:
  - Earth-Two, a parallel world in the DC Multiverse; the home of DC's Golden Age heroes
  - JLA: Earth 2, a graphic novel about another alternate Earth in the DC Universe
- Earth analog, a planet similar to Earth
- Planet Earth II, 2016 UK TV documentary series
