= Betzy Bromberg =

American experimental filmmaker

- Occupations: Former Director of the Program in Film and Video at California Institute of the Arts, Visual Effects Supervisor, Film Director, Cinematographer, Editor, Sound Designer, Professor.
- Years active: 1976–present
- Notable work: Voluptuous Sleep (2011), A Darkness Swallowed (2005)

Betzy Bromberg is an American director, editor, and experimental filmmaker. She was the Director of the Program in Film and Video at California Institute of the Arts (2002 - 2019), and remains in the position of full time Faculty. Her work has been shown at the Rotterdam, London, Edinburgh, Sundance and Vancouver Film Festivals as well as the Museum of Modern Art (New York City), Museum of Fine Arts, Boston, the San Francisco Cinematheque, the Harvard Film Archive (Cambridge), Anthology Film Archives (New York City), the National Film Theater (London), The Vootrum Centrum (Belgium) and the Centre Georges Pompidou (France).

Bromberg studied at CalArts in the late 1970s with Chick Strand, and for many years was an optical effects supervisor in the special effects industry.

== Background ==
Bromberg originally studied journalism and photography at Northwestern University before she became a filmmaker. Bromberg started making her first films at Sarah Lawrence College in 1977, where she studied both film and electronic music. After she graduated from college, Betzy Bromberg relocated to Los Angeles and studied at CalArts under Chick Strand. Later, she spent over twenty years working in the Hollywood industry as an optical effects camerawoman and supervisor. She began teaching in 1990 and in 2002, she became the Director of the Program in Film and Video at CalArts after the industry abandoned analog effects and moved much production overseas.

== Style ==
Bromberg's earlier films were influenced by New York, where she spent was born and raised, and spent part of her college career. She is known for her experimental avant-garde stylistic approach in cinema. In many of her works she experiments with the intersection of documentary and avant-garde.

Bromberg's work in the Hollywood industry of optical effects allowed her to carry over technical and problem solving skills to her experimental work without detriment to its avant-garde themes. Additionally, her experimental film works have all been shot in 16mm, an analog medium which Bromberg says she will work with until "either I'm done or it's done," in reference to the dominance of digital filmmaking in Hollywood.

The style of Bromberg's experimental films is described as slowly evolving into the abstract, consciously free of the special effects of her industry career, and evocative of "a retrieval of a kind of visual innocence." Bromberg's use of light and the transformation of the movement of light over time is the basis of her filmmaking and can be seen throughout her works.

== Directorial filmography ==
Film name	Details
Glide of Transparency	2016, 16mm, color, sound, 89 minutes, a film in three parts. The third feature-length experimental film following a Darkness Swallowed and Voluptuous Sleep. Sound: Betzy Bromberg, Dane A. Davis, Stephen Small, Robert Allaire, Pam Aronoff Vocals: Pam Aronoff; sound mix: Dane A. Davis.
Voluptuous Sleep	2011, 16mm, color/sound, 95 minutes, experimental film Part I: Language is a Skin Sound and Music: Dane A. Davis, Zack Settel, Jean-Pierre Bedoyan, Pam Aronoff, James Rees, and Betzy Bromberg Part II: And the Night Illuminated the Night Music: Robert Allaire, performed by the Formalist Quartet Screened and exhibited: Premiered at REDCAT; festival premiere at the New York Film Festival: Views From The Avant-Garde. The Hirshhorn Museum in Washington D.C., the Buenos Aires Festival Internacional de Cine Independiente (BAFICI 2012), the Bradford International Film Festival (United Kingdom), the CinemaSpace at the Segal Centre of Performing Arts (Montreal) as part of Suoni per iI Popolo Avant-Garde Music Festival, and the Guggenheim Bilbao (Spain) Award: 50th Ann Arbor Film Festival (2011)
a Darkness Swallowed	2005, 16mm color/sound, 78 minutes, experimental film Director, Cinematographer and Editor: Betzy Bromberg; Music: Zack Settel, Jean-Pierre Bedoyan, Paul B. Cutler, Pam Aronoff, Jacob Ross, Dane A. Davis, Bromberg Resin Sculptures: Stephen Small Screened and exhibited: 2006 Sundance Film Festival, the Seoul Film Festival (South Korea), the Athens International Film Festival (Greece), the Bradford International Film Festival (England), Seattle International Film Festival (Washington), the Centro de Cultura Contemporanea de Barcelona, (Spain), and Ponrepo, theater of the Czech National Film Archives (Prague, Czech Republic).
Divinity Gratis	1996, 16mm, color, sound, 59 minutes, documentary/experimental Director, Editor, and Producer: Betzy Bromberg Cast: Duchess DeSade, Kory Ivy Vence, Kirby White Music: Kirby White, Claire Dishman, Dianna Rose. Cinematography: Betzy Bromberg, Claire Dishman, Brian Bailey, Dianna Rose Sound: Dane A. Davis Title Design: Peter L. Levine
Body Politic (god melts bad meat)	1988, 16mm, color/sound, 40 min.
Temptation	1987, 16mm, color, sound, 4 minutes, music video Director: Betzy Bromberg, for Tom Waits
Az Iz	1983, 16mm, color, sound, 37 minutes
Marasmus	1981, 16mm, color, sound, 24 minutes, collaborated with Laura Ewig
Soothing the Bruise	1980, 16mm, color/sound, 21 minutes.
Ciao Bella	1978, 16mm, color/sound, 13 minutes
Petit Mal	1977, 16mm, color, sound, 18 minutes
You Can Practically Taste It With Your Eyes	1977, Super-8, color, sound, 45 minutes, collaborated with Lauren Abrams
Screaming Susan	1977, Super-8, B/W animation, 3 minutes
Tachycardia	1977, Super-8, hand-processed, color, sound, 80 minutes

== Recognition ==
2011 Voluptuous Sleep

- premiered at the 2011 New York Film Festival: Views From The Avant-Garde.
- listed as one of the Best Films for 2011 in both the New York Times and Indiewire.
- Awarded the Stan Brakhage award at the 50th Ann Arbor Film Festival.
- Screened at the Bradford International Film Festival in the United Kingdom.
- Premiered at the Buenos Aires Festival Internacional de Cine Independiente, BAFICI in 2012.
- Premiered at Buenos Aires International Festival of

2005 a Darkness Swallowed

- Premiered at the 2006 Sundance Film Festival.
- Screened at Seoul Independent Film Festival in South Korea.
- Screened at the Athens International Film Festival in Greece.
- Screened at the Bradford International Film Festival in the United Kingdom.
- Screened at the Seattle International Film Festival in Washington.
- Screened at Buenos Aires International Festival of Independent Cinema, BAFICI in 2007 as part of a Retrospective of Bromberg's films.
