= Eve Heller =

American film producer

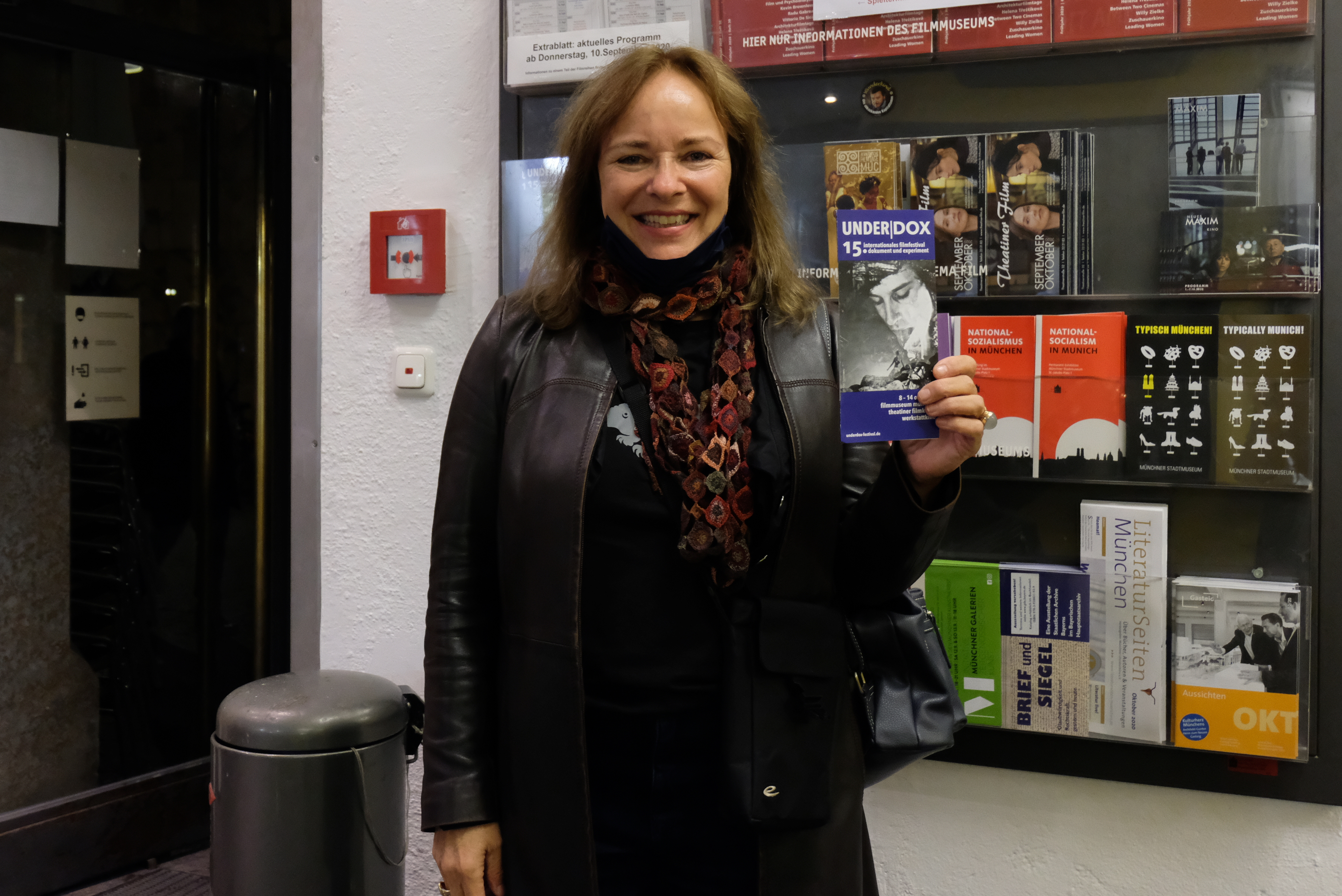
Eve Heller after a lecture on her films in Munich (2020)

Eve Heller, born in 1961 in Amherst, is an American filmmaker based in Vienna, Austria.

Her work has been shown at the New York Film Festival, the Whitney Museum of American Art, the Pacific Film Archives, the International Film Festival Rotterdam, the Louvre and the Austrian Film Museum.

Her German mother and Austrian father had to emigrate from Austria to the United States in 1938 because of the Nazis. Heller grew up bilingual. She attended the University at Buffalo's Department of Media Studies and studied filmmaking at Bard College. Her teachers there included Peggy Ahwesh, Abigail Child, Peter Hutton, Paul Sharits and Tony Conrad. She also studied German literature and Interdisciplinary Studies.

At the age of 17, studying in Buffalo, she started filmmaking. Heller claims that the lively avantgarde scene there concerning all kinds of disciplines had a great influence on her work.

Heller works with 16mm film, sometimes hand-processed. She uses an JK optical printer to work on found footage frame by frame, enlarging image details and dissecting and composing the material in cut-up technique reminiscent of William S. Burroughs. Through the editing of slowed-down and layered images she brings her source material into a new context and creates a dreamlike atmosphere. By doing so she also makes the materiality of the medium she works with palpable.

Besides filmmaking Heller teaches on analog filmmaking and works as a translator, specializing in texts about cinema.

Her partner is the Austrian filmmaker Peter Tscherkassky. They worked together on the book "Film Unframed: A History of Austrian Avant-Garde Cinema" which describes the historical and aesthetic evolution of Austrian avant-garde film.

== Filmography ==
- Astor Place (10 min, 1997)
- Behind This Soft Eclipse (10 min, 2004)
- Creme 21 (10 min, 2013)
- Her Glacial Speed (10 min, 2001)
- Juice (4 min, 1982–2010)
- Last Lost (14 min, 1996)
- One (2 min, 1978–2010)
- Ruby Skin (4 min 30 sec, 2005)
- Self-Examination Remote Control (5 min, 1981–2010)
