= Sobrante Ridge Regional Preserve =

Park in California, United States

Coordinates: 37°57′54″N 122°15′53″W

- Location within San Francisco Bay Area Location within California Location within the United States
- Location: Richmond, California, Contra Costa County, California
- Area: 277 acres (1.12 km^{2})
- Created: 1985
- Operator: East Bay Regional Park District

Sobrante Ridge Regional Preserve (SRRP) is a regional park in Richmond, Contra Costa County, California and is part of the East Bay Regional Parks (EBRPD) system. (Note: The name is sometimes incorrectly written as Sobrante Ridge Botanic Regional Preserve.) The park preserves one of the few habitats of the Alameda manzanita, which is deemed extremely rare, according to EBRPD.

== History ==
The land on which SRRP lies was once part of the Rancho El Sobrante grant that the government of Mexico gave to Juan Jose Castro. Although the cited source gives 1840 as the date of the grant, several other sources say that the grant was made in 1841. (Note: Sobrante translates to "excess" or "left over" in English, according to EBRPD. The name was used because the land was "left over" after most of the available land had previously been granted by the government.)

The site was owned in more recent times by Cutter Laboratories, a Berkeley-based pharmaceutical company. Cutter raised horses and cattle on the property, using blood from the animals to produce vaccines for diphtheria and tetanus. The German pharmaceutical company bought the entire Cutter company in 1974. Part of the Sobrante Ridge property was dedicated to EBRPD by a local construction company in 1980.

== Features ==
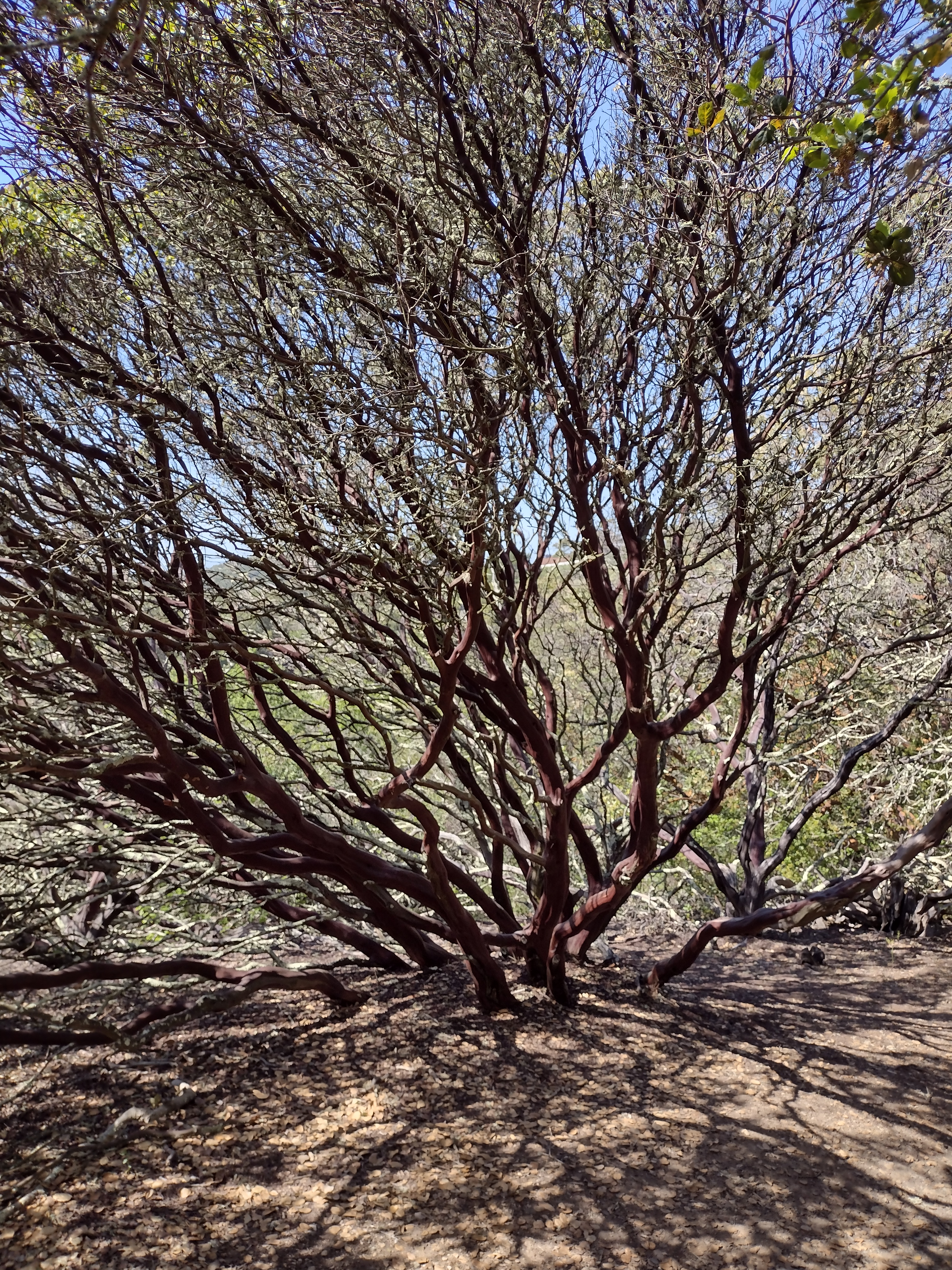
Alameda manzanita in the SRRP

The preserve covers 277 acres (1.12 km^{2}). Flora includes oak/bay woodland, coyote brush scrub, Alameda manzanita and open grassland.

== Activities ==
- Popular activities include: hiking, dog walking, picnicking, bird watching, bicycling (on approved trails) and naturalist programs.
- Picnic tables are available on a first-come, first-served basis and cannot be reserved. There are no reservable campsites.
- The preserve has three entrances: Coach Drive, Conestoga Drive and Heavenly Ridge Lane, all in Richmond. Hiking trails also lead to the preserve from Pinole Valley Park in Pinole, California and through the Pinole Watershed in Unincorporated Contra Costa County via the Bay Area Ridge Trail.
- Trails are either dirt fire roads or single-track, multi-use trails that are not rated as wheel-chair accessible. EBRPD plans to install a wheelchair-accessible gate at the Heavenly Ridge Lane entrance in the future, but the schedule has not been announced.

== See also ==
- Alameda manzanita
- Rancho El Sobrante
