= Amy Halpern =

American experimental filmmaker (1953–2022)

Amy Halpern (1953 – August 15, 2022) was an American experimental filmmaker.

== Biography ==
Amy Halpern was born in 1953 to Ben and Lois Jule Halpern. Ben was a publicist for United Artists and MCA Universal. She grew up in New York City, where she learned about experimental film through attending programs with her father at the Museum of Modern Art. Halpern trained as a dancer and joined the Lynda Gudde Dance Company, studying under Anna Sokolow and Meredith Baylis. She attended Binghamton University for six months.

While working as a typist, Halpern began making short 8 mm films, before transitioning to 16 mm. She co-founded the Collective for Living Cinema in 1972 and was involved with Ken and Flo Jacobs' New York Apparition Theatre. Her silent film Filament (The Hands) shows Mikis Theodorakis conducting at Independence Hall. It uses changes in film stock to make his gestures increasingly grainy and abstract.

In the mid-1970s, Halpern moved to Los Angeles to study film at UCLA. There, she appeared in Chick Strand's Soft Fiction and worked closely with filmmakers of the L.A. Rebellion. She also worked on mainstream Hollywood movies like Godzilla 1985 and Alien Resurrection, serving as best boy/electrician on Stand and Deliver and I'm Gonna Get U Sucker. Halpern's only feature-length film, Falling Lessons, consists of vertically panned shots of nearly 200 faces.

Halpern and her husband David Lebrun created the production company Night Fire Films, for documentary and animated works. She worked closely with the Single Wing Turquoise Bird light show, originally established by Lebrun in the 1960s.

Halpern died on August 15, 2022, in Los Angeles.
