= Flaming Ears =

1992 Austrian experimental lesbian science fiction film

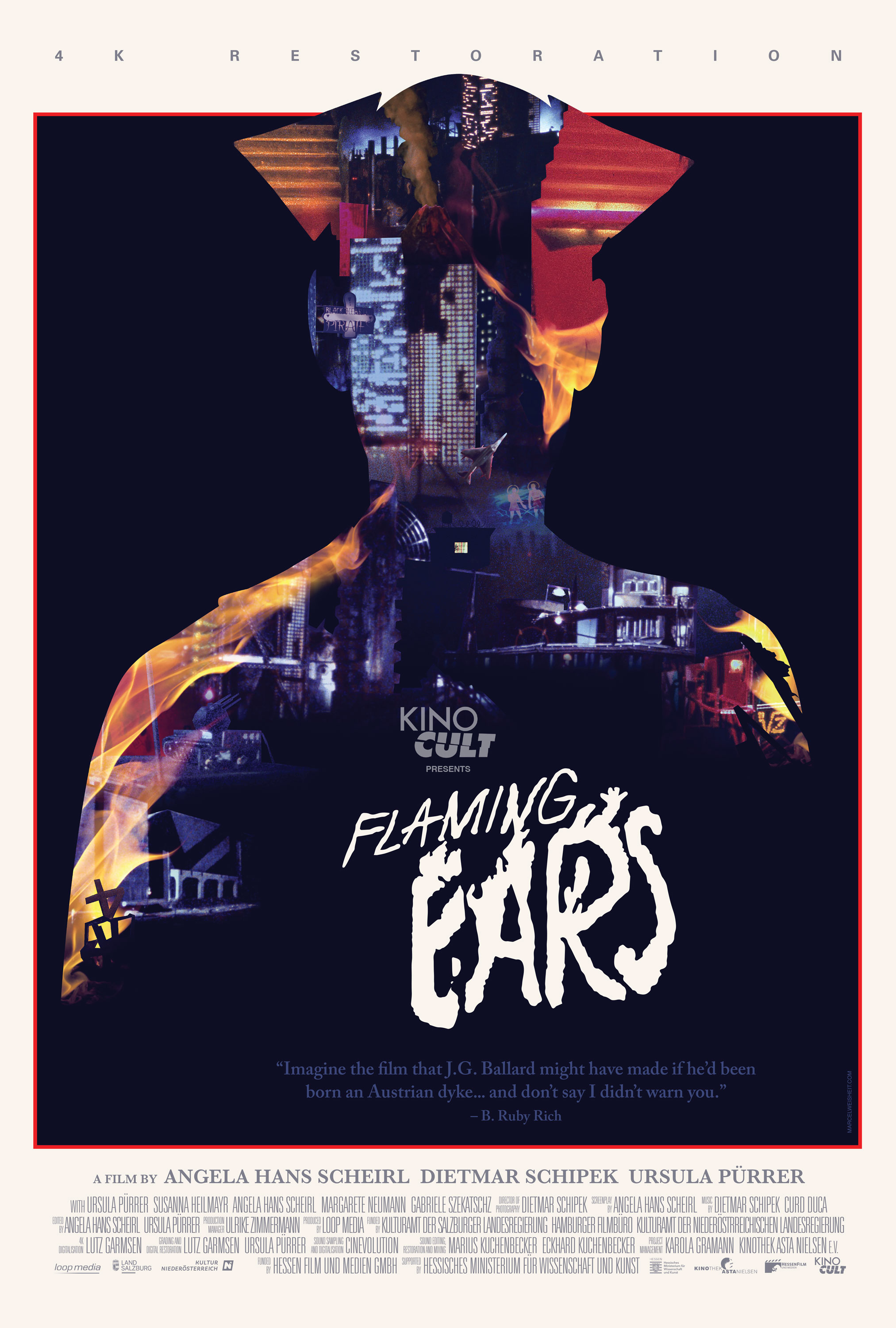
- Flaming Ears Theatrical release poster
- Directed by: A. Hans Scheirl; Ursula Pürrer; Dietmar Schipek
- Written by: Ursula Pürrer; Dietmar Schipek
- Produced by: Barbara Moorse; Martin Moszkowicz
- Starring: Susana Helmayr; Ursula Pürrer; A. Hans Scheirl; Margarete Neumann; Gabriele Szekatsch
- Cinematography: Manfred Neuwirth; Margarete Neumann
- Music by: Dietmar Schipek
- Distributed by: Kino Lorber
- Release date: June 1992 (Austria)
- Running time: 84 mins
- Country: Austria
- Languages: German; French; English

Flaming Ears (transl. The Fan) is a 1992 Austrian experimental science fiction queer film directed by and starring A. Hans Scheirl, Ursula Pürrer, and Dietmar Schipek. The film is set in the burned-out fictional city of Asche in the year 2700 and follows the tangled lives of three characters: a comics artist named Spy, a clubgoing pyromaniac named Volley, and an enigmatic reptile-eating alien named Nun.

A restoration of the film was released in theaters on November 16, 2022. The restored Flaming Ears was reconstructed from prints after the original negatives and sound recordings were lost.

== Plot ==
Set in the year 2700 in the fictional burned-out city of Asche, the story follows the tangled lives of three women. Spy is a comic book artist whose printing presses are burned down by Volley, a sexed-up pyromaniac. Seeking revenge, Spy goes to the lesbian club where Volley performs every night. Before she can enter, Spy gets into a fight and is left wounded in the streets. She is found by Nun, an amoral alien in a red plastic suit who lives on a diet of rats and plastic reptiles and also happens to be Volley's lover. Nun takes the injured Spy home and must hide her from Volley.

== Cast ==
- Susana Helmayr as Spy
- Ursula Pürrer as Volley
- A. Hans Scheirl as Nun
- Margarete Neumann as M
- Gabriele Szekatsch as Blood
- Anthony Escott as Man with Cactus
- Luise Kubelka as Girl
- Dietmar Schipek as Corpse Washer
- Heiderose Hildebrand as Tailor
- Sabine Perthold as Tolisa
- Norbert Gmeindl as Explosive Dealer
- Bella Gmeindl as Explosive Dealer
- Billa Gmeindl as Explosive Dealer
- Karin Melton as Club Bouncer
- Monika Bernold as Club Bouncer
- Birge Krondorfer as Vampire
- Arleen Schloss as Passerby
- Birgit Langenberger, Julia Kordina, Gabi Mattes, Gerda Ambros, Ulli Sladek, Gabi Prosek, Brigitta Palkner, Brigitte Luise Roth, Karin Rick, Liselotte Brodil, Bea Sommersguter, Ingrid Kaindl, Uli Aigner, Jana Cejpek, Gudrun Kampl, and Andrea Witzmann as Clubgoers

== Style and production ==
Flaming Ears was shot on Super 8 and features extensive use of miniatures, stop-motion animation, and matte painting. The film was produced with a small cast and on a low budget. The film's directors and writers also perform in the film as actors.
