= Arctostaphylos pallida =

- Arctostaphylos pallida in Oakland

Conservation status
- Critically Imperiled (NatureServe)

Scientific classification
- Kingdom: Plantae
- Clade: Tracheophytes
- Clade: Angiosperms
- Clade: Eudicots
- Clade: Asterids
- Order: Ericales
- Family: Ericaceae
- Genus: Arctostaphylos
- Species: A. pallida

Binomial name
- Arctostaphylos pallida Eastw.

Species of flowering plant

Arctostaphylos pallida, commonly known as pallid manzanita, Oakland Hills manzanita, and Alameda manzanita, is an upright manzanita shrub from the Ericaceae, or heath family. It is endemic to the eastern San Francisco Bay Area of Northern California.

== Description ==
Arctostaphylos pallida grows to around 6–13 ft (1.8–4.0 m) in height. The branches on the shrub are reddish or grayish (more reddish) and they have twigs that tend to be bristly. The ovate to triangular leaves are bristly, strongly overlapping and clasping. They are 1.0 to 1.8-inch (46 mm) long and 0.8 to 1.2-inch (30 mm) wide.

The dense, white flowers are urn-shaped and 0.2 to 0.3-inch (7.6 mm) long. The flowering period is from November to March.

A. pallida commonly co-occurs with another manzanita species, brittle leaf manzanita (Arctostaphylos crustacea subsp. crustacea), but the latter is a burl-forming species with spreading leaves. A. pallida does not form burls.

Characteristic crowded leaves on short petioles

Underside of leaves is nearly smooth

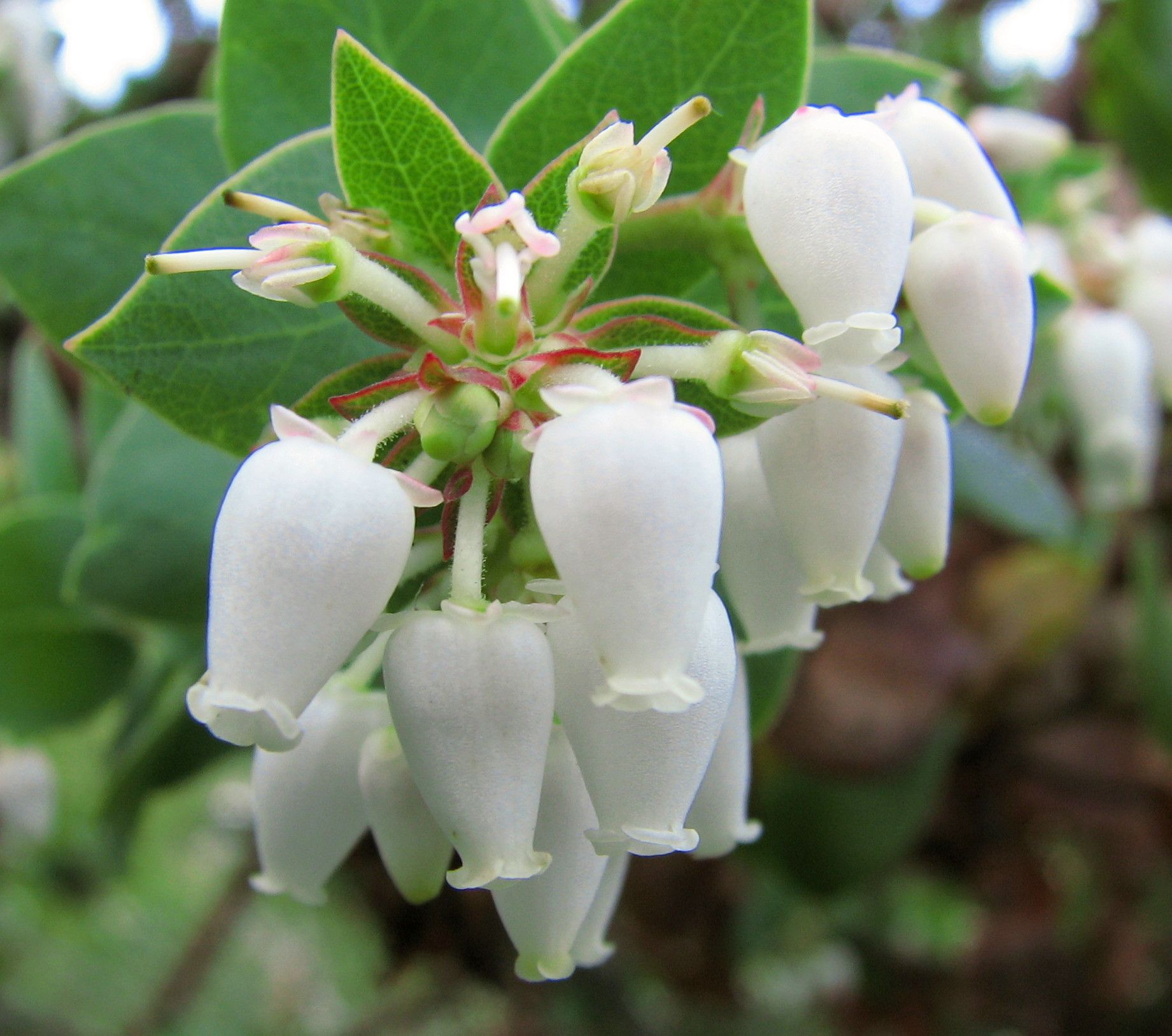
The flowers

The growth habit: note lack of burl

== Distribution ==
The species is found from 656–1,460 feet (200–445 m) in elevation, primarily on thin soils composed of chert and shale. The plants are found in manzanita chaparral habitat of the montane chaparral and woodlands ecosystem, and is frequently surrounded by oak woodlands and other chaparral shrubs.

Endemism

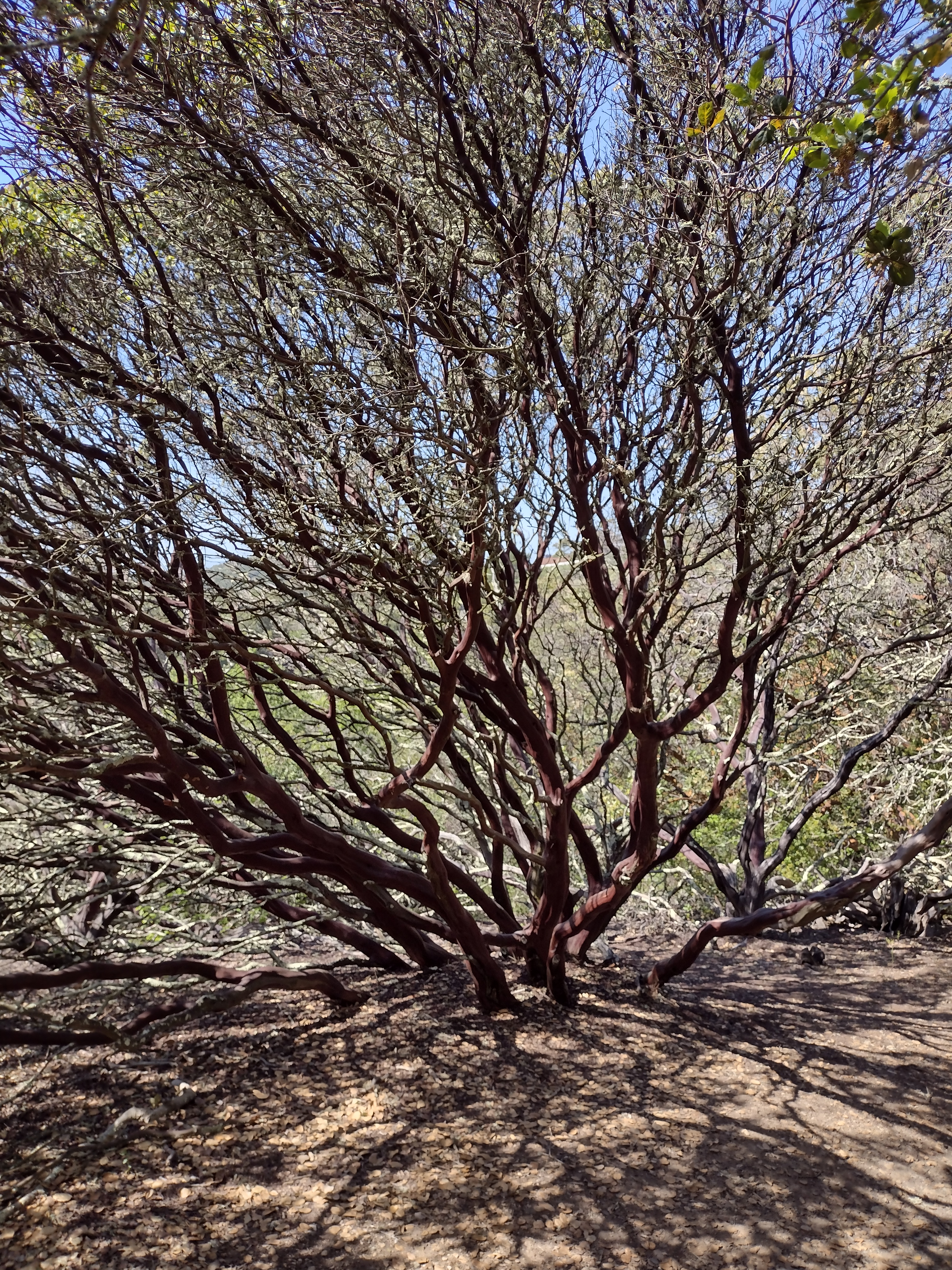
Alameda manzanita in the Sobrante Ridge Regional Preserve

Arctostaphylos pallida is known from approximately 13 populations in Alameda and Contra Costa counties. The two largest populations, which are owned by the East Bay Regional Park District, are located at Huckleberry Ridge—Huckleberry Botanic Regional Preserve in Alameda and Contra Costa Counties and at Sobrante Ridge Regional Park in Contra Costa County.

Several other small, natural and planted populations occur in Alameda and Contra Costa counties. The two largest groups occupy an area of approximately 82 acres (330,000 m^{2}). These two populations are found in maritime sage and chaparral, a habitat with mesic soil conditions and a maritime influence. Many smaller populations occur in coastal scrub.

=== Threats ===
The primary threats to the species are the effects of fire suppression, and shading and competition from native plants, and introduced and invasive species. To a lesser extent, the species is threatened by fungal infection, herbicide spraying, hybridization, construction of roads, and the ongoing effects of habitat fragmentation and loss.

This is a federally listed threatened species. It was listed as an endangered species by the California Department of Fish and Game in November 1997. The California Native Plant Society has placed it on List 1B (rare or endangered throughout its range).

== See also ==
- List of California native plants
- Index: Endemic flora of California
