= Bruce Baillie =

American film director (1931–2020)

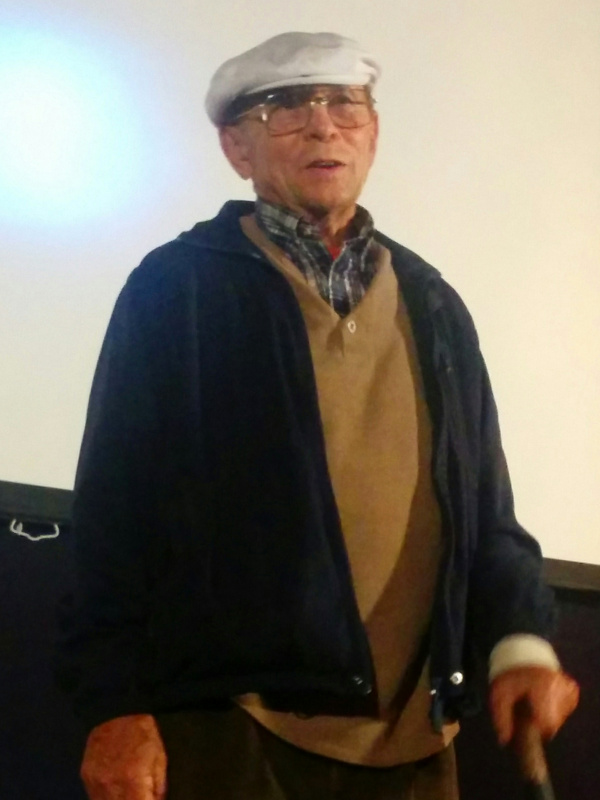
- Baillie in 2016
- Born: September 24, 1931; Aberdeen, South Dakota, U.S.
- Died: April 10, 2020 (aged 88); Camano Island, Washington, U.S.
- Education: University of Minnesota; University of California, Berkeley; London School of Film Technique
- Occupation: Experimental filmmaker
- Spouse: Lorie Apit (m. 1986)
- Children: 2

Bruce Baillie (September 24, 1931 – April 10, 2020) was an American experimental filmmaker.

== Early life ==
Baillie was born in Aberdeen, South Dakota, on September 24, 1931, to Gladys and E. Kenneth Baillie. His father, E. Kenneth Baillie, was a sculptor who taught at Northern State Teachers College. After graduating high school, Baillie served in the Navy during the Korean War. He studied art at the University of Minnesota and the University of California, Berkeley, before studying filmmaking at the London School of Film Technique.

== Career ==
Baillie moved to Canyon, California, in 1960, working as a longshoreman and making short films. He got a projector and army surplus screen to put on shows in his backyard. Chick Strand and Ernest Callenbach became involved with the exhibition program, known as Canyon Cinema, and eventually they began holding screenings around the Bay Area.

Also, in 1961, Baillie, along with friend and fellow cinematic artist Chick Strand, founded San Francisco Cinematheque.

His body of cinematic work includes Quick Billy, To Parsifal, Mass for the Dakota Sioux, Castro Street, All My Life, Valentin de las Sierras, and Tung.

== Personal life ==
Baillie married Lorie Apit in 1986. They had two children, Wind Gwladys Baillie and Keith Kenneth Baillie. Baillie died on April 10, 2020, in Camano Island, Washington.

== Legacy ==
In 1991, he was the recipient of AFI's Maya Deren Independent Film and Video Artists Award.

His 1966 short film Castro Street was selected in 1992 for the United States National Film Registry.

In 2012, Stanford University acquired Baillie's archives and the archives of Canyon Cinema. The Academy Film Archive has preserved a number of Bruce Baillie's films, including Castro Street, Still Life, Cherry Yogurt, Little Girl, Roslyn Romance (Is It Really True?), and Quick Billy Rolls.

His films influenced George Lucas, who would attend screenings of Canyon Cinema in his youth.

== Filmography ==
- On Sundays (1960–1961)
- David Lynn's Sculpture (1961, unfinished)
- Mr. Hayashi (1961)
- The Gymnasts (1961)
- Friend Fleeing (1962)
- Everyman (1962)
- News #3 (1962)
- Have You Thought of Talking to the Director? (1962)
- Here I Am (1962)
- A Hurrah for Soldiers (1962–1963)
- To Parsifal (1963)
- Mass for the Dakota Sioux (1964)
- The Brookfield Recreation Center (1964)
- Quixote (1964–1965, revised 1967)
- Yellow Horse (1965)
- Tung (1966)
- Castro Street (1966) filmed on Castro Street in Richmond, California
- All My Life (1966)
- Still Life (1966)
- Termination (1966)
- Port Chicago Vigil (1966)
- Show Leader (1966)
- Valentin de las Sierras (1971)
- Quick Billy (1971)
- Roslyn Romance (Is It Really True?): Intro. 1 & II (1978)
- Roy Eldridge (1987)
- The P-38 Pilot (1990)
- The Holy Scrolls (completed 1998)
- Pietà (1998)
- Salute (1999)
- Robert Fulton (2011)
- Don Larson (2014)
- Les Memoires d'un Ange (Remembering Life) (2014) Video work unfinished.
- "Dr Bish's Birthday", by Yeh Tung (2015)
- Little Girl (Released in 2014, made in 1966)
- I Wish I Knew (Released in 2015, original VHS from 1989)
- Commute (2015) with Lorie Baillie.
- To the Women Soldiers of Kobani & Damascus (2015) Video by Bill McLane, poem by Bruce Baillie & Eliza McLane.
