= Marina Gržinić =

Slovenian philosopher and theoretician

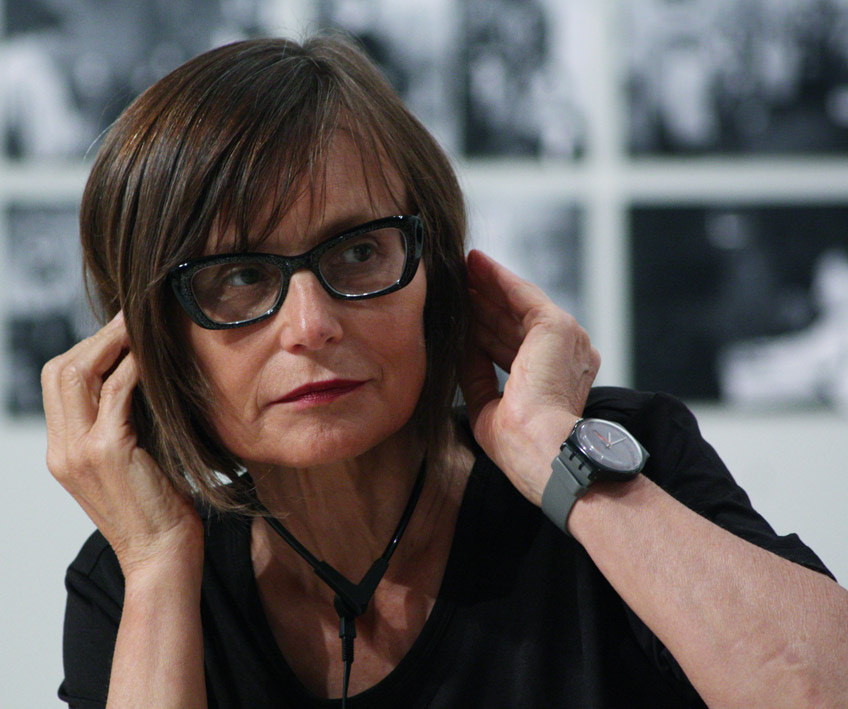
Gržinić in 2014

Marina Gržinić (born 1958) is a philosopher, theoretician, and artist from Ljubljana. She is a prominent contemporary theoretical and critical figure in Slovenia. Since 1993, she is employed at the Institute of Philosophy at the Scientific and Research Center of the Slovenian Academy of Science and Arts (short ZRC-SAZU in Slovenian and SRC-SASA in English). Today, she serves as a professor and research adviser. For her scientific work, she received the Golden SASA sign in 2007. Since 2003, she has also served as a Full Professor at the Academy of Fine Arts in Vienna, Austria. She publishes extensively, lectures worldwide, and is involved in video art since 1982.

== Early life and education ==
Marina Gržinić was born in 1958 in Rijeka (Yugoslavia), in present-day Croatia. She was raised in an Italian minority family. She moved alone to Ljubljana at the age of seventeen (after completing her gymnasium studies in Rijeka). She received her Bachelor of Arts in analytical sociology in 1985, completed her Master of Arts in 1991 at the Faculty of Arts, and received her doctoral title in 1995 from the Department of Philosophy, Faculty of Arts, University of Ljubljana. The title of her dissertation was Virtual Reality: Achronic Time, Paraspace, and Simulation. Gržinić was one of the first, if not the first in Slovenia and maybe ex-Yugoslavia, with a doctorate in philosophy and virtual reality, cyberspace, cyberfeminism (Haraway), postcolonial theory (Trinh T. Minh-ha), French structuralism, and media theory (Baudrillard, Couchot, Klonaris/Thomadaki, Virilio, etc.). In the period from 1997 to 1998, she completed her postdoctoral academic training in Japan, at the University of Tokyo (she received the Japan government grant, JSPS) and spent a year with Professor Machiko Kusahara.

== Career ==
In Ljubljana, she engaged in the constitution of what is today known as the Ljubljana alternative or subcultural movement that, in the 1980s, developed new artistic practices (like video and performance) politically engaged movements such as the LGBT+ scene, and many other processes that were constitutive for the discussion of the position of art and culture in Slovenia in connection with demands and struggles for a political emancipated life that bypasses the middle-class bourgeoisie perception of the Slovenian society and reality.

=== Theory ===
Gržinić's theoretical work focuses on contemporary philosophy and aesthetics after modernism. Her work is directed towards a theory of ideology, theory of technology, biopolitics/necropolitics, video technology, and transfeminism in connection with decoloniality. Gržinić's work cannot be easily circumscribed in this or that school or discipline, though in recent years, she has brought forward global critical philosophy, which is both daring and dangerously concrete in being alert, critical for the local, against racism, coloniality and globally questioning capitalism, and necropolitics.

It is important to highlight her theoretical approach that is between the politically performative theory and activist criticism and theory in action. This means that Gržinić's position is not a disengaged area of interpretation that derives from theoretical and philosophical contemplation but that her work in philosophy, theory, and arts derives from concrete theoretical practice and interventions and related cultures.

She regularly implements her research results in the processes of education and as well in other disciplines, especially art disciplines. She finally engages significantly in public life at home and abroad, being part of different struggles politically and socially motivated against capitalism and its processes of dispossession, racism, and brutal discrimination.

=== Art/video ===
Gržinić is active in video art and media art since 1982. She works in collaboration with Aina Šmid, an art historian and artist from Ljubljana.

From November 11, 2022, to February 28, 2023, the Loža Gallery Koper, Slovenia, hosted a major retrospective exhibition of works and visual installations by Marina Gržinić & Aina Šmid, from 1982 to 2022, entitled ODPADNIŠKE ZGODOVINE / STORIE DISSIDENTI / DISSIDENT HISTORIES, curated by Mara Ambrožič Verderber. A comprehensive study by Tjaša Kancler is published in the leaflet for the exhibition and in the reader.

== Selected works ==
Books from 1995 on:

- V vrsti za virtualni kruh : čas, prostor, subjekt in novi mediji v letu 2000, (Zbirka Sophia, 1996, 5). Ljubljana: Znanstveno in publicistično središče, 1996. SLOVENIAN
- Rekonstruirana fikcija : novi mediji, (video) umetnost, postsocializem in retroavantgarda : teorija, politika, estetika : 1997–1985, (Knjižna zbirka Koda). Ljubljana: Študentska organizacija Univerze, Študentska založba, 1997. SLOVENIAN
- U redu za virtualni kruh, (Biblioteka Intermedia, knj. 2). Zagreb: Meandar, 1998. CROATIAN
- Fiction reconstructed : Eastern Europe, post-socialism & the retro-avant-garde. Vienna: Selene, 2000. ENGLISH
- Estetika kibersveta in učinki derealizacije, (Zbirka Prizma). Ljubljana: Založba ZRC, ZRC SAZU, 2003. SLOVENIAN
- Situated contemporary art practices : art, theory and activism from (the east of) Europe. Ljubljana: Založba ZRC: = ZRC Publishing; Frankfurt am Main: Revolver – Archiv für aktuelle Kunst, 2004. ENGLISH
- Avangarda i politika : istočnoevropska paradigma i rat na Balkanu, (Bibliteka Slovenica). Belgrade: Belgradeski krug, 2005. SERBIAN
- Estetika kibersvijeta i učinci derealizacije, (Basic). Zagreb: Multimedijalni institut; Sarajevo: Košnica – centar za komunikaciju i kulturu, 2005. CROATIAN
- Une fiction reconstruite : Europe de l'Est, post-socialisme et rétro-avant-garde, (Ouverture philosophique). Paris; Budapest; Torino: Harmattan, 2005. FRENCH
- Re-politicizing art, theory, representation and new media technology, (Schriften der Akademie der bildenden Künste Vienna, Vol. 6). Vienna: Schlebrügge.Editor, cop. 2008. ENGLISH
- Necropolitics, Racialization, and Global Capitalism. Historicization of Biopolitics and Forensics of Politics, Art, and Life. Marina Gržinić and Šefik Tatlić, Lexington books, 2014.
- Regimes of invisibility in contemporary art, theory and culture: image, racialization, history. Marina Gržinić, Aneta Stojnić and Miško Šuvaković, eds., Cham: Palgrave Macmillan. cop. 2017.
- Shifting corporealities in contemporary performance: danger, im/mobility and politics, Marina Gržinić and Aneta Stojnić, eds., (Avant-gardes in performance). Cham: Palgrave Macmillan. cop. 2018.
- Border Thinking. Disassembling Histories of Racialized Violence. Marina Gržinić, ed., Vienna, Berlin: Publication Series of the Academy of Fine Arts Vienna. Vol 21., and Sternberg Press, 2018.
- Arte-Política-Resistencia, Tjaša Kancler, Barcelona: Ediciones t.i.c.t.a.c., 2018. SPANISH
- Opposing Colonialism, Antisemitism, and Turbo-Nationalism. Rethinking the Past for New Conviviality. Marina Gržinić, Jovita Pristovšek, Sophie Uitz, eds. PEEK/FWF Research Project Vienna, 578 pp., Cambridge Scholars, United Kingdom, 2020.
- Dialogues for the Future: Countering the Genealogy of Amnesia, Marina Gržinić, Šefik Tatlić in collaboration with Valerija Zabret, Jovita Pristovšek, Tjaša Kancler, and Sophie Uitz, 312 pp., Center for Cultural Decontamination CKZD, Belgrade, Serbia, Academy of Fine Arts Vienna; PEEK/FWF Research Project Vienna, 2020.
- Re-Activating Critical Thinking in the Midst of Necropolitical Realities: For Radical Change, Marina Gržinić, Jovita Pristovšek, 458 pp., eds. Cambridge Scholars, United Kingdom, 2022.
- Parallel Histories of Slovenia's Empowerment and Urbanity 1980-1990-2000. The collection of material compiled by Marina Gržinić.
