= Martin Arnold (filmmaker) =

Austrian film maker

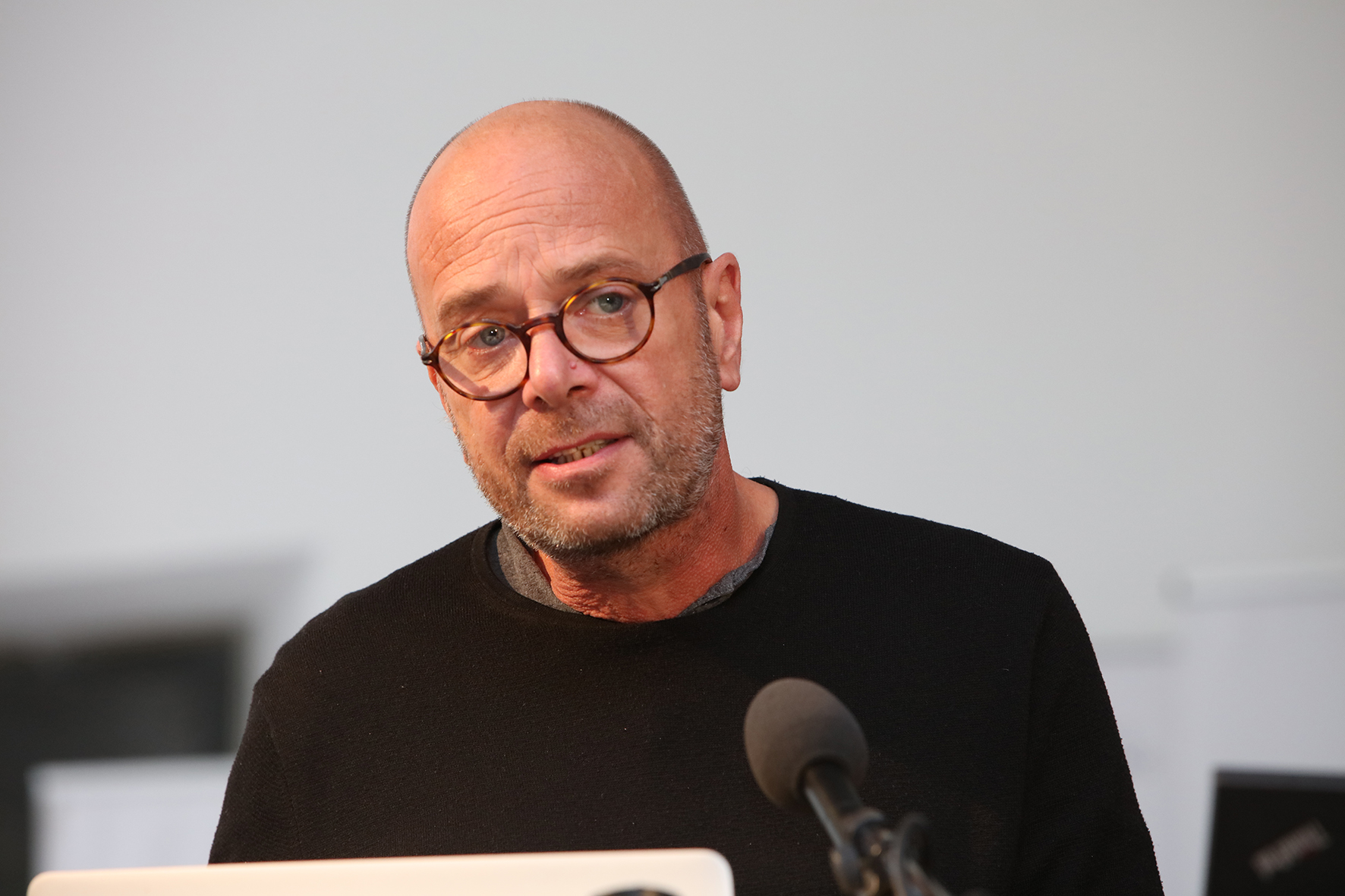
- Martin Arnold in 2018
- Occupation: Filmmaker
- Website: martinarnold.info

Martin Arnold (born 1959 in Vienna, Austria) is an experimental filmmaker known for his obsessive deconstruction of found footage.

== Career ==
Arnold's films are intensely cut sequences in which several seconds of old movie clips are taken and stretched out into much longer works. The figures on the screen flip back and forth between frames, as the motion is repeated and reversed, and numerous single frame cuts are made. His intent is to create, or possibly unearth, narratives concealed within the mundane films from which he samples. In films such as Pièce Touchée (1989) and Passage à l'acte (1993) for example he uses several seconds of the films The Human Jungle and To Kill a Mockingbird, the latter to create a bizarre story of aggression and tension within a traditional American family.

== Later works ==
In a later group of short film loops such as Soft Palate (2010) and Whistle Stop (2014), Arnold seems to discover psychoanalytic underbellies in the most popular form of post-war family entertainment, animation, and its most iconic characters such as Mickey Mouse (using two of Mickey's shorts, one of them Mickey's Delayed Date), Tom And Jerry, Daffy Duck (Draftee Daffy) and Goofy (How To Play Golf).

== Accolades ==
His work has been shown at 168 international film festivals, including Cannes, Rotterdam and New York. At these festivals he has won 34 awards, such as the Golden Gate Award at the San Francisco International Film Festival (1990), the Primo Premio at the Arco Madrid's Week of Experimental Cinema (1994) and the Main Award at the International Short Film Festival Oberhausen (1998). For his entire oeuvre he was awarded for Honors for Art in Cinema by the State of Austria (1994) and the Province of Lower Austria (1995). In addition to festival screenings, Arnolds's films have been shown at various cinematheques such as the Cinematheque in Paris, the Cinematheque Royale in Brussels, the National Film Theatre in London, the San Francisco Cinematheque, and the Cinematheque of the MoMA in NYC. Arnold's work was also included in museum exhibitions at places such as the Witte de With in Rotterdam, the Bozar in Brussels, the Barbican Art Center in London, the Kunsthaus Zürich and the Hamburger Kunstverein, among others. Essays on his work and at-length interviews have appeared in several film and art magazines including Afterimage, Film Quarterly, Frieze Magazine, Cahiers du Cinéma, and Semiotiques, and in catalogues and books such as Martin Arnold – Gross Anatomies by Martin Janda and Martin Arnold – Deanimated by Gerald Matt and Thomas Miessgang, A Critical Cinema 3 by Scott MacDonald, L’Art du mouvement by Jean-Michel Bohours for the Centre Georges Pompidou. Reviews of his film and installation works were published in numerous papers including The New York Times, The Village Voice, The Chicago Weekly Reader, L. A. Weekly, The Guardian, Le Monde, La Liberation and Die Neue Zürcher Zeitung.

== Personal life ==
He taught at several American universities and art schools such as the University of Wisconsin, Milwaukee (1995), the San Francisco Art Institute (1996/97), Bard College (2000/01), Binghamton University (2004–2007) and CalArts (2008). In Europe Arnold had guest professorships at the Städelschule in Frankfurt (1999), the FAMU in Prague (2009/10) and the University of Art and Design in Linz (1998).

== Selected filmography ==
=== 2014 ===
- Whistle Stop, format variable, color, sound, 3:30 loop

=== 2013 ===
- Charon, format variable, color, silent, 00:08 loop
- Hydra, format variable, color, silent, 00:21 loop
- Nix, format variable, color, silent, 00:05 loop
- Tooth Eruption, format variable, color, sound, 5:20 loop

=== 2011 ===
- Haunted House, format variable, color, sound, 3:00 loop
- Self Control, format variable, color, sound, 2:00 loop

=== 2010 ===
- Soft Palate, format variable, single screen, color, sound, 3:10 loop
- Shadow Cuts, format variable, color, sound, 4:20 loop

=== 2007 ===
- Coverversion, format variable, color, sound, 7:30 loop
- Cloudy Insulin, format variable, 2 screens, color, sound, 6:00 loops

=== 2005 ===
- Silent Winds, format variable, 3 screens, color, sound, 12:00 loops

=== 2003 ===
- Jeanne, quicktime data, b/w, silent, endless loop

=== 2002 ===
- Deanimated, format variable, b/w, sound, 60:00 loop
- Dissociated, format variable, 2 screens, b/w, sound, 8:00 loops
- Forsaken, format variable, 2 screens, b/w, 9:00 loops

=== 1998 ===
- Alone. Life Wastes Andy Hardy, format variable, b/w, sound, 15:00

=== 1997 ===
- Psycho. Viennale Spot, 35mm, b/w, sound, 1:00

=== 1996 ===
- Don’t - The Austrian Film, 35mm, b/w, sound, 3:00

=== 1994 ===
- Kunstraum Remise. Spot, 35mm, color, sound, 1:00

=== 1993 ===
- passage à l’acte, format variable, b/w, sound, 12:00

=== 1989 ===
- pièce touchée, format variable, b/w, sound, 16:00
