= Anti-Banality Union =

Experimental filmmaking collective

The Anti-Banality Union is an American experimental filmmaking collective. Since 2011 the group has made four collage films that use found footage from Hollywood studio films, re-edited to draw out political themes.

== Description ==
The collective began with three members but has changed over time; its members remain anonymous. They have cited the Situationist International as an influence but distinguish their form of détournement as "letting the integrated spectacle speak for itself" instead of "using the master's tools to say something you already wanted to say." The group's logo is an exclamation mark and question mark arranged to form a hammer and sickle symbol.

== Works ==
The group's first film Unclear Holocaust assembles 50 disaster films set in New York City. It premiered in 2011, on the 10th anniversary of the September 11 attacks.

The Anti-Banality Union's second film was conceived of while waiting for the release of a friend arrested at Occupy Wall Street protests. It began as a cataloging of police deaths in Hollywood films before growing into a narrative of escalating police violence. They edited 122 movies together to create Police Mortality. The film's narrative begins with the suicide of a retired police officer and continually escalates, through protests and a police strike, into a large battle between police forces. It premiered at Spectacle Theater on February 26, 2013.

The group's third film State of Emergence uses footage from zombie films, removing zombies from the narrative. It shows its characters' struggle to survive while escaping a rapid societal collapse. The film premiered on October 19, 2014, at Spectacle Theater.

Following several years of inactivity, the Anti-Banality Union began work on Earth II, which took five years to complete. It depicts a climate collapse, drawing from a wider range of sources but concentrating on science fiction and climate fiction movies. Compared to the collective's earlier works, it more closely resembles a Hollywood blockbuster and adheres to a traditional three-act structure. Earth II premiered at Spectacle Theater in January 2022.

== Filmography ==
- Unclear Holocaust (2011)
- Police Mortality (2013)
- State of Emergence (2014)
- Earth II (2022)
