= Peter Tscherkassky =

Austrian avant-garde filmmaker (born 1958)

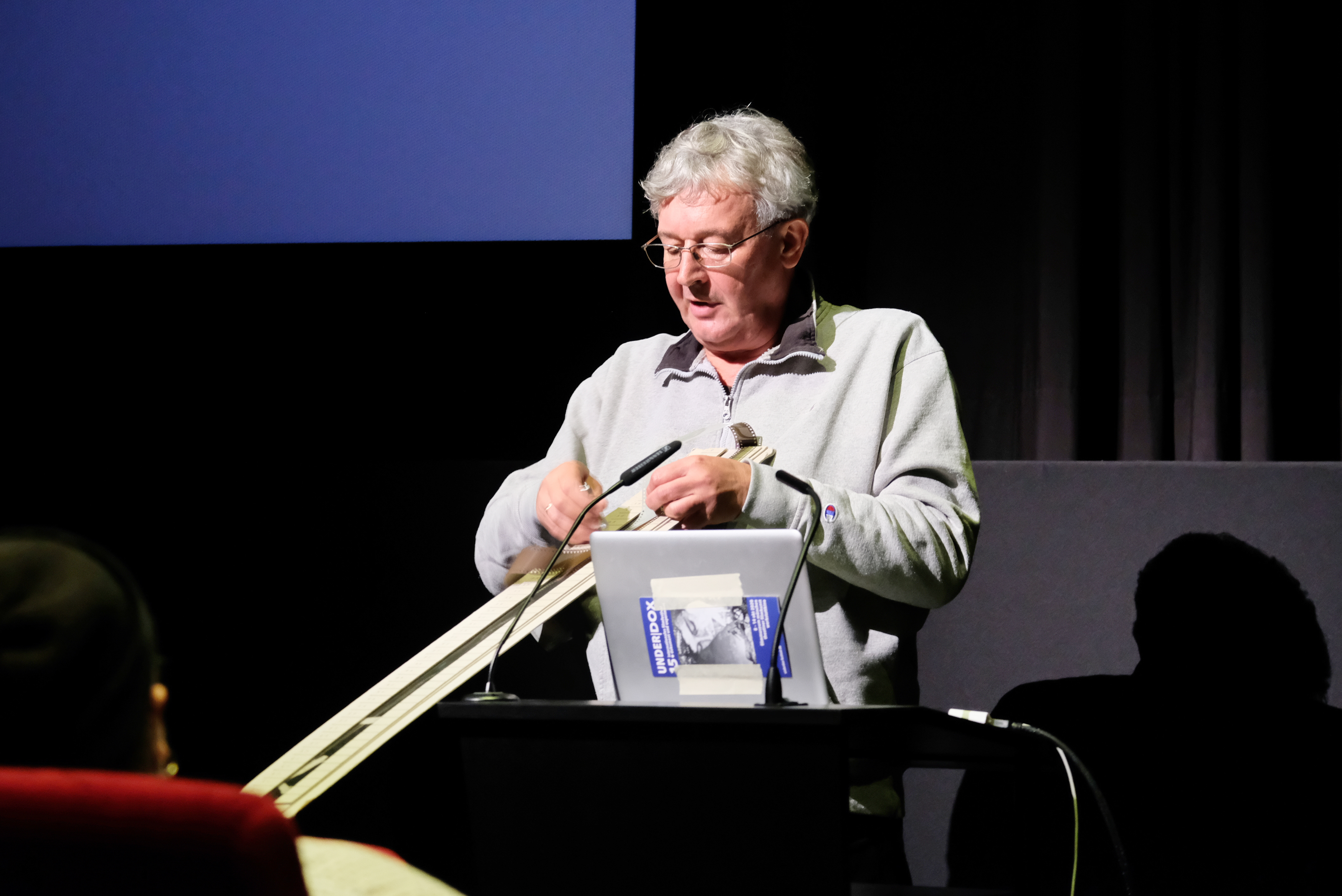
Peter Tscherkassky during a lecture, explaining his working method (2020)

Peter Tscherkassky (born October 3, 1958) is an Austrian avant-garde filmmaker who works primarily with found footage. Tscherkassky works primarily with found footage, constructing his films by hand in the darkroom by copying and rearranging source material.

== Early life ==
Tscherkassky was born October 3, 1958, in Vienna, Austria. He attended the Primary School in Mistelbach from 1965 to 1969 and Jesuit boarding school from 1969 to 1975 in Vienna. He attended BORG (high school) Mistelbach and graduated in June 1977. From 1977 to 1979 Tscherkassky studied journalism and political science as well as philosophy at the University of Vienna. His first encounter with avant-garde film was in January 1978 when he attended a five-day lecture series by P. Adams Sitney at the Austrian Film Museum.

== Film career ==
Tscherkassky began filming in 1979 when he acquired Super-8 equipment and before the end of the year he had scripted and started off the shooting of Kreuzritter. Throughout his career he conceived numerous film festivals, including “The Light of Periphery: Austrian Avant-Garde Film, 1957–1988” (1988), “Im Off der Geschichte” (1990), “Found Footage: Filme aus gefundenem Material” (1991), and “Unknown Territories: The American Independent Film” (1992). He was also the founding member of the newly Austria Filmmakers Cooperative which began in 1982 and resigned from his position there in 1993. His work Instructions for a Light and Sound Machine (2005) had its world premiere at the Cannes Film Festival in the Director's Fortnight programme.

== Filmography ==
- Bloodletting (1981)
- Erotique (1982)
- Love Film (1982)
- Freeze Frame (1983)
- Holiday Movie (1983)
- Miniaturen: Many Berlin Artists in Hoisdorf (1983)
- Motion Piction (1984)
- Manufracture (1985)
- Kelimba (1986)
- Shot Countershot (1987)
- Tabula Rasa (1987/89)
- Parallel Space: Inter-View (1992)
- Happy-End (1996)
- L'Arrivée (1997/98; using footage from L'Arrivée d'un train en gare de La Ciotat (1896) by the Lumiere Brothers and Mayerling (1968) by Terence Young)
- Outer Space (1999; using footage from The Entity (1982) by Sidney J. Furie)
- Get Ready (1999)
- Dream Work (2001; using the same film as Outer Space)
- Instructions for a Light and Sound Machine (2005; using footage from The Good, The Bad and The Ugly (1967) by Sergio Leone)
- Nachtstück (Nocturne) (2006)
- Coming Attractions (2010)
- The Exquisite Corpus (2015)
- Train Again (2021)

== See also ==
- Martin Arnold - closely associated with Tscherkassky
- Cinephilia
