= Canyon, California =

Unincorporated community in California, United States

Canyon
- Unincorporated community
- Location in California Canyon (the United States)
- Coordinates: 37°50′02″N 122°09′54.1″W
- Country: United States
- State: California
- County: Contra Costa

Government
  - State Senator: Tim Grayson (D)
  - State Assembly: Rebecca Bauer-Kahan (D)
  - U.S. House: Mark DeSaulnier
  - Contra Costa County Supervisor (District 2): Candace Andersen
- Elevation: 1,138 ft (347 m)

Population
  - Total: 208
- GNIS ID: 255912
- FIPS code: 06-10830

Canyon, formerly known as Sequoya or Sequoia Canyon, Elkhorn, and The Redwoods, is an unincorporated community located near the border of Contra Costa and Alameda counties, in the U.S. state of California. It is situated between Oakland and Moraga in the San Francisco Bay Area. Canyon resides on the Spanish land-grant tract named Laguna de los Palos Colorados (Lake of the Red Trees). The community is named for its location in the upper canyon of San Leandro Creek along the eastern slope of the Berkeley Hills. Canyon lies at an elevation of 1138 feet (347 m).

The community is mainly traversed by Pinehurst Road and Canyon Road. The homes of the community are nestled amongst the steep, narrow private roads and footpaths that extend from the redwood groves and ferns along the creek, through the mixed live oak, bay, and madrone forests on the steep hillsides, up to the chaparral and knobcone pines that grow along the ridge.

== History ==
Canyon has a colorful history. Logging camps and notorious saloons helped establish a local reputation for rowdiness in the nineteenth century. A vast forest known as the Moraga Redwoods once covered the valley that is now Canyon. An extant fire trail west of the spot where Pinehurst Road makes a sharp hairpin turn near Huckleberry Botanic Regional Preserve was previously known as Winding Way on some maps, and was originally an old 19th century logging road built by Hiram Thorn. In the 1850s, Thorn operated a mill on the site. Thorn built the road to bring redwood logs out of the forest and to his mill, and then over the mountain into Oakland via the Temescal Creek route on the northwest edge of Montclair Village. The Oakland part of the route is now known as Thornhill Road.

In the first half of the 20th century, the local water company, East Bay Municipal Utilities District, purchased much land south of town. They constructed the Upper San Leandro Reservoir, which, as it filled up, slowly flooded the former towns of Valle Vista and Redwood. The reservoir also flooded several neighborhoods of Canyon itself. In fact, the only reason Canyon is not the size of neighboring Moraga is because of a lack of a viable water resource. The few people that do live there are mostly commuters and retired people who like the town's seclusion and its proximity to San Francisco, Oakland, and San Jose.

Earlier in the 20th century, the Sacramento Northern Railway ran through the canyon for which the community is named. The rails ran on a bench (still present) above Pinehurst Road, upon exiting a long tunnel from Oakland at the site of Thorn's road. The eastern portal (called Eastport by the railroad) just north of Canyon was buried by a landslide in 1980 and is no longer visible, but was located on the inside of the hairpin turn on Pinehurst Road.

=== Associations ===
Today's residents still work together to maintain their own roads and water systems, and Canyon Community Association volunteers provide mediation services, emergency planning, and interface with county and state agencies. The Canyon Community Association was created as a reaction when Moraga, a neighboring incorporated town, attempted to encroach on property. When a roadway was failing, the Road Association raised $30,000 to rebuild. Much of the land beyond the community is owned by the East Bay Municipal Utility District (EBMUD).

=== Culture and traditions ===
In the late 1960s, Canyon became a center of political and social protest and creative alternative lifestyles. Canyon Cinema of San Francisco was founded by neighbors here in the 1960s. In the summer of 1967 Country Joe and the Fish with the Youngbloods played a benefit for the Canyon School.

Since 1971, the community of Canyon, California has maintained an annual tradition of decorating a memorial Christmas tree in honor of Christopher, a young boy who died that year. Planted over his ashes behind the family's home, the tree is decorated each December 12 with handmade ornaments created by local children and residents. While originally intended to remember Christopher, the tradition has expanded to include ornaments for other deceased community members, serving as a broader memorial within the town.

The tree located at the entrance to Old Redwood Highway is a landmark that also acts as a community bulletin board, communication hub, and home directory.

=== Land use disputes and countercultural period (1951–1970) ===
By 1951, the East Bay Municipal Utilities District (also referred as East Bay MUD) purchased land in the area to reduce the risk of water contamination from future building developments, which led county officials to impose a moratorium on new construction in Canyon. East Bay MUD determined that the residents' septic tanks would contaminate the creek which flows into the San Leandro Reservoir. Author John van der Zee described Canyon's transformation, noting that "[t]his rustic redevelopment policy, zealously pursued during the 1950s and '60s, restored natural vegetation, brought about an upsurge in wildlife, increased privacy--and reduced the community by half its houses and more than half its people."

Resisting East Bay MUD's land acquisitions, Canyon residents joined together to collectively purchase available property. In 1967, when a twenty-six-acre bloc was put up for sale, a cooperative land association called the Water Brothers outbid East Bay MUD for the property at a price of $60,000. A builder, Barry Smith, found out that a widow had sold the acres to East Bay MUD, and hired a real estate lawyer to get her out of the contract. Through word-of-mouth and ads in the underground press, he found 14 people to collectively purchase the land. The event is described in the 1970 book Eco-Catastrophe:

"This group of buyers decided that except for each individual's homesite, they would hold the land in common. They began to call themselves the Water Brothers Association, a name derived from Robert Heinlein's Stranger in a Strange Land, in which the sharing of water becomes the highest honor one man can bestow upon another--thus the notion of 'water brothers.'"

In response to the purchase of 26 acres by Water Brothers, East Bay MUD influenced the Board of Supervisors to pass a new ordinance that restricted new construction by prohibiting the issuance of septic tank permits. The 1969 enforcement orders required Canyon residents to install a centralized sewage system with new taxes and maintenance costs—an arrangement that ran counter to the community's long-standing resistance to formal civic structures. Resident Doug McMillan proposed a community-managed sewage disposal system. His Preliminary Engineering Report on the Canyon Community Special Services District outlined a self-financed water recycling plan intended to provide sewage treatment, irrigation, and firefighting at a lower cost than a conventional sewer system. The proposal was reviewed in a series of supervisor's hearings through the summer of 1969 and finally defeated by the county water and health authorities, and East Bay MUD.

In February 1969, an earlier complaint from three long-standing residents prompted the Contra Costa County authorities to order ten sheriff's deputies, two state narcotics agents, three county building inspectors, and an animal control officer to evict forty people—nearly a quarter of Canyon's inhabitants. Eviction cases appeared before Judge Robert Cooney. A standoff ensued but ended peacefully.

By 1970, residents of Canyon clashed with county and utility officials over their right to remain and build in the area. They formed a community services district, but county supervisors rejected it. Resident spokesperson Sally Keher led efforts to defend the town. Contra Costa county building inspector Rudolph John Kraintz condemned several homes, including two tree houses, as unsafe, while former utilities commissioner William M. Bennet represented residents in hearings before the Board of Supervisors, highlighting ongoing tensions over housing regulation and community independence.

As county hearings continued, conditions in Canyon began to shift. In April 1970, newly appointed East Bay MUD general manager John Harnett ended the agency's long-standing policy of purchasing land in Canyon, citing public criticism and local opposition. Following the change the utility district undertook cleanup and rehabilitation efforts in the area, including providing garbage containers and replacing barbed wire fencing with low timber rails, signaling an improvement in relations between the district and the community.

=== Shell Oil pipeline explosion (March 17, 1969) ===
During a strike in March 1969, a disgruntled worker bombed the Shell Oil pipeline that ran through Canyon. On March 17, after a minor blast had been reported around 9 p.m., the Sheriff's department has dispatched two patrol cars to investigate. The 160-resident community was evacuated after a larger blast was reported at 11:30 p.m. Oakland sent three fire companies to aid the Moraga fire department. After 1 a.m. the fire was reported under control. The explosion killed a Shell employee and injured at least seven persons, including five sheriff's deputies. Jet fuel leaked into San Leandro Creek and caused an explosion. The old dance hall burned down. The town's general store, which had been established in 1855, and the post office were burned down.

== Climate ==
Canyon enjoys a cool summer Mediterranean climate (Koppen classification csb) similar to that of the nearby city of Oakland, though slightly warmer. Fog maintains the cool summer weather.

== Demographics ==
Historical population
Census	Pop.	Note	%±
2000	211		—
2010	211		0.0%
2020	212		0.5%
2023 (est.)	208		−1.9%

The 2020 United States census reported Canyon had a population of 208. The population density was 59 inhabitants per square mile (23/km^{2}).

Canyon, California – Racial and ethnic composition Note: the US Census treats Hispanic/Latino as an ethnic category. This table excludes Latinos from the racial categories and assigns them to a separate category. Hispanics/Latinos may be of any race.
Race / Ethnicity (NH = Non-Hispanic)	Pop 2010	Pop 2020	% 2010	% 2020
White alone (NH)	188	184	89.11%	86.8%
Black or African American alone (NH)	2	5	0.94%	2.36%
Native American or Alaska Native alone (NH)	2	0	0.94%	0%
Asian alone (NH)	12	5	5.69%	2.36%
Other race alone (NH)	0	3	0%	1.41%
Mixed race or Multiracial (NH)	7	15	3.32%	7.07%
Total	211	212	100.00%	100.00%

== Administration ==
Public decision-making occurs through informal, consensus-based community meetings, as Canyon lacks a city council or formal local government. The phone tree, updated annually by unknown volunteers, also serves broader public safety communication needs.

== Infrastructure ==
The only public services in the community are the local post office (ZIP Code 94516) where all mail is picked up, and the three-room schoolhouse Canyon Elementary School, a 68-student K-8 public school, located on Pinehurst Road on the banks of the Upper San Leandro Creek. Canyon Elementary School operates as its own district. It has a school board, and the principal also serves as the district superintendent.

A notion of the community's unconventionality may be gleaned from the fact that the school lunch menu features organic milk and produce, Niman Ranch beef, and hormone and antibiotic free chicken. The community is in area code 925.

As John van der Zee wrote in his book about the town, Canyon (1972):

A small assemblage of mostly unconventional dwellings, mostly built by the nonconformists who live in them, it is a consciously ecological community that recycles everything it can. In Canyon, the mutual respect and the cohesion of neighbors revive the vital satisfactions once intrinsic in human communities, and its 'civil agencies' are functions of the inhabitants.

In addition to keeping post office boxes, residences are not located on formal street addresses. Unofficial street names include Boulevard of the Stars, Mermaid's Cove and Fuzzy Frog Ravine. Directions in the area are often given using local landmarks and natural features. In response to the Oakland Hills fire in 1989, Fire officials wanted houses to have numbers. According to a 2002 news article published in the Contra Costa Times, the numbering system was completed although only for official use.

Water service in Canyon is partially provided by the Moraga Heights Mutual Water Company, a non-profit cooperative. Established in the 20th century, the company originally distributed spring water and now sources water from a well located on a nearby hill. Built in the late 1980s, the well includes a treatment system and is subject to regular oversight by the Contra Costa County Health Department, which conducts monthly sampling and extensive testing every three years. The water system infrastructure was designed and installed by the members themselves, who also perform ongoing maintenance. Each household is equipped with a water meter, and costs are distributed based on usage, covering materials for system upkeep rather than the water itself.

Between 2011 and 2013, a Carmelite monastery was located on a ranch in the western area of the town. The nuns moved in 2014 to a building in the nearby town of Kensington, California.

== Crime and public safety ==
Canyon residents value close community ties and self-reliance. After a bomb scare raised concerns about effectiveness of county law enforcement, locals formed informal neighborhood watch groups.

Crime in Canyon is low and rarely reported, with only a handful of incidents. The sheriff's office seldom patrols the area, and residents prefer to handle issues themselves, relying on community association.

Fire protection is a community effort. The area is served by the Moraga Fire Department and the U.S. Forest Service, though emergency response times can be delayed due to the remote location. As a result, residents have developed an informal system for early fire response, including an air raid siren and a community phone tree that alerts neighbors to the location of a fire. Although the community considered forming a certified volunteer fire department, concerns about legal liability deterred formalization.

== Timeline ==
- 1850s: First settlers
- 1913: Passenger service on the Oakland, Antioch and Eastern railroad begins
- 1918: First Canyon School is built
- 1922: Canyon Post Office is built
- 1927: Canyon given its name
- 1993: Old school replaced by a three-classroom building
