= Anita Thacher =

American visual artist and experimental filmmaker (died 2017)

- Born: 1940 or 1936
- Died: September 8, 2017 (aged 76–77)
- Occupations: Filmmaker; Visual Artist; Installation Artist; Painter
- Spouse: Ken Nochimson (until 2017)
- Website: Anita Thacher

Anita Thacher (died September 8, 2017) was an American visual artist and experimental filmmaker based in New York. Her work has been displayed around the world and included in the collections of many museums such as the MoMA in New York, the Metropolitan Museum of Art, the J. Paul Getty Museum, and the Art Institute of Chicago.

She is known for films such as Homage to Magritte (1974), Loose Corner (1986) and the trilogy of shorts, Cut (2013), Chase (2015), and The End (2015). She is also known for the installation piece "Illuminated Station" at the Greenport Long Island train station.

== Education ==
She studied English literature at The New School for Social Research, earnings a bachelor's degree. She also studied painting at the New York Studio School of Drawing, Painting, and Sculpture.

== Career ==
Over the course of her career Thacher created numerous paintings and art installations as well as sixteen experimental art films. The first being "Permanent Wave" in 1968 and "Back Track" (1969) with Dennis Hopper. Through the 1970s she continued to make experimental films creating one of her most famous pieces "Homage to Magritte" in 1974 with Dennis Oppenheim and Dee Dee Halleck. Homage to Magritte is a series of surrealist visuals that evoke the work of famous painter René Magritte. In this period many of her films were shown at festivals, such as Sea Travels (1978) which was screened at The American Film Festival in 1979.

Thacher's work continued to play with the surrealist nature of film. In the 1981 group show "Film as Installation", Thacher's still in-progress piece "Loose Corner" (1980–1986) was said to work "to 'sabotage' film's trompe l'oeil illusionism". The film originally featured fellow artist and friend, Francesca Woodman, but this version was never exhibited as Woodman died before all the scenes were complete.

Thacher was both a friend, colleague, and neighbor to Woodman. Commentators have suggested that Woodman's suicide had a large personal effect on Thacher who in 1981, the year of Woodman's death, created the art installation "Light House" which contained an empty chair with images of people projected onto in. The piece reflects impermanence, absence and the presence of loss. She also continued making experimental films in this period, screening one at Berlin International Film Festival in 1987.

In 1995, Thacher was commissioned to create "Illuminated Station" a public work of art and installation piece around an 1894 train station built in Greenport Long Island. She permanently added new sets of cobalt blue, yellow and green LED lights that frame the station and its eaves in light. The building is owned by the MTA, but as of 2005 it now houses the East End Seaport Museum and Maritime Foundation.

Thacher was also a fellow and resident of the MacDowell Colony for 7 years in the late 70s and 80s. She also served on the board of directors from 1979 to 1985.

=== Post-Death ===
Thacher's work has continued to be shown following her death. In 2017, her analog slide show installation Anteroom was displayed and Thacher was described both as a "traditional modernist" and "ahead of her time". The work was later acquired by the Guggenheim in 2018.

In 2017, many of Thacher's films were added to the Academy of Motion Picture Arts and Sciences' Academy Film Archive for preservation and restoration. In 2022, her film "Loose Corner" (1983) was exhibited again and received a comment in The New Yorker as "cleverly linking Cubist sight gags and casually surreal vignettes."

== Themes ==
Thacher's film work was largely surrealist, creating absurdist visuals and playing with the unreality of film and projection.

In some of her films, Thacher's remixing and recutting of existing footage has been noted as part of a trend of female visual artists deconstructing dominant cultural codes and sexism.

== Filmography ==
- Permanent Wave (1968)
- Manhattan Doorway (1968–1980)
- Back Track (1969)
- Mr. Story (1972)
- Homage to Magritte (1974)
- Sea Travels (1978)
- The Breakfast Table (1979)
- Loose Corner (1980–1986)
- One Art (1987)
- Painted Earth, the Art of the Mimbres Indians (1989)
- To The Top (1991)
- Docking at X (2001)
- Lost / In Memoriam (2006)
- Cut (2013)
- Chase (2015)
- The End (2015).
