= Chick Strand =

American film director

- Chick Strand, ca. 1970. Photo by Neon Park
- Born: Mildred D. Totman; December 3, 1931; San Francisco, U.S.
- Died: July 11, 2009 (aged 77)
- Occupation: Film director
- Years active: 1964–1995

Mildred "Chick" Strand (December 3, 1931 – July 11, 2009) was an American experimental filmmaker and ethnographer based in California and Mexico. Chick Strand's filmmaking approach combined anthropological methods with experimental filmmaking techniques, and incorporated personal elements from her own life experiences with societal forces and realities. Strand contributed to the movement of women's experimental cinema in the early 1960s–1970s as "a pioneer in blending avant-garde techniques with documentary" Strand also influenced the independent filmmaking movement of the 1960s as the editor of Canyon CinemaNews. Feminist issues and anthropological inquiries about the human condition are frequent themes in Strand's films. However, because Strand's films and work were often deeply personal and subjective, they were often rejected from male-dominated academic circles of anthropologists and critiqued for being non-academic works.

== Biography ==
Born Mildred D. Totman in Northern California she was given the nickname "Chick" by her father. Her father, Russel Totman, was a bank teller in the Bay Area. Her mother, Eleanor Totman, was a homemaker in Berkeley, CA. Strand described her family as "working people" who had lived in California for hundreds of years. She married her first husband, Paul Anderson Strand, in 1957, and they had one son, film editor Eric Strand, best known for his work on Donnie Darko.

Chick Strand studied anthropology at the University of California, Berkeley, and was interested in photography and collages due to taking a photography course early on in life before becoming involved in filmmaking. In the early 1960s, Strand organized film happenings with filmmaker Bruce Baillie. The two would show experimental films in their backyards in Berkeley, California. Strand met her second husband, Neon Park, an artist, in the early 1960s in Berkeley. They were collaborators in art and life for over 30 years, dividing their time between Los Angeles and San Miguel de Allende, a small town in Mexico. Neon Park died from ALS (Lou Gehrig's disease) in 1993. In 1966 she enrolled in the ethnography program at UCLA, and after graduating in 1971 taught for 24 years at Occidental College. While in Mexico, Strand made documentary films about the people she met there. In later years she became a painter.

Though Chick Strand often incorporated female characters and narratives in her film, she denies being a part of the Women's Movement. Instead, she posits that her work is more about human experience in general, and not necessarily explicitly about female experience.

== Career ==
Chick Strand's work during the 1960s, 1970s, and 1980s influenced the subsequent era of subjectivity and ethnographic film in the 1990s. The films that she produced during the 1960s and 1970s reflected the cultural and political atmosphere of the United States during that time, resulting in the films expressing liberal and radical overtones evidenced in the exploratory nature of her films. Strand used images in film to project her belief of cultural relativity and the importance of context.

Chick Strand and Bruce Baillie were among the group of filmmakers that founded the Canyon Cinema film society in 1961. The "community-oriented screenings evolved into a formal organization" called the San Francisco Cinematheque. In 1967, Canyon Cinema was re-established as an artist-run film distribution company. Strand said most filmmakers involved "considered Canyon Cinema and the Cinematheque as sort of one thing but doing different things," Throughout the 1960s, Strand also edited Canyon Cinema News, a filmmaker's newsletter that "supplied information about alternative film production and exhibition practices," Bruce Baillie taught Chick Strand basic film technique before launching film projects together. Chick Strand made her first film at age 34.

Mosori Monika (1969) is a documentary about colonialism in Venezuela, told from the points of view of an elderly Warao woman, a Franciscan nun and the filmmaker herself. Other films on Latin America include Cosas de mi Vida (1976), Guacamole (1976) and Mujer de Milfuegos (Woman of a Thousand Fires) (1976). Strand's ethnographic films are distinctive for their complex layering of sound and image, and the juxtaposition of found footage and sound with original images. Later works include Cartoon le Mousse (1979), Fever Dream (1979) and Kristallnacht (1979). Fake Fruit Factory (1986) is included on the National Film Preservation Foundation's 2009 DVD Treasures IV: American Avant-Garde Film, 1947-1986. Soft Fiction (1979) is a short film that includes various personal narratives, told from the points of view of five women, mostly about their sexual and sensual experiences.

== Style and themes ==
Chick Strand is best known for her unique use of camera and film editing techniques to portray metaphorical meaning through image. Strand often used camera techniques such as image overlapping and superimposed images in her films. Sound and image are relied upon to convey meaning through Strand's films.

Strand used film as an ethnographic method for investigating the lived experiences of various communities. She believed that traditional anthropological research methods of ethnography could be fused with art through filmmaking. Her work explores notions of objective reality, philosophical questions of theory of mind, and the barrier between theories of mind and scientific reality.

Themes of gender and sexuality are frequent topics of her work. Strand released the film Soft Fiction (1979) during the second wave of feminism which included narratives and histories of women who experienced rape, incest, drug addiction, and vulnerability. Strand used her position as filmmaker to explore notions of femininity and the male gaze that often dominates popular cinema and films. She attempted to deconstruct unequal power relations and structures through her work with experimental film.

== Preservation ==
Her films have been screened at the Museum of Modern Art and the Tate. An early promotional film for Sears, made with Pat O'Neill and Neon Park, is held along with her complete body of work in the collection of the Academy of Motion Picture Arts and Sciences. The Academy Film Archive has preserved a number of Strand's films, including Cartoon Le Mousse, Eric and the Monsters, and Fever Dream. In 1996, Strand won the Maya Deren Award from the American Film Institute to honor independent avant-garde and experimental filmmaking. In 2011, Fake Fruit Factory was selected to the U.S. National Film Registry.

== Legacy ==
Chick Strand's aesthetic style, editing techniques and ethnographic approach to films about women are of interest to film scholars and are considered to have been "ahead of the time" Strand was working in. Her work has been reappraised by film scholars and continues to be studied for its influence in women's experimental cinema.

In 2023, a profile of Strand was featured in the New York Times' Overlooked section, celebrating the impact of historical figures whose deaths went previously unreported by the newspaper.

== Filmography ==
Year	Title
1964	Eric and the Monsters
1966	Angel Blue Sweet Wings
1967	Anselmo
1967	Waterfall
1970	Mosori Monika
1976	Cosas de mi Vida
1976	Elasticity
1976	Guacamole
1976	Mujer de Milfuegos (Woman of a Thousand Fires)
1979	Cartoon le Mousse
1979	Fever Dream
1979	Kristallnacht
1979	Loose Ends
1979	Soft Fiction
1986	Anselmo and the Women
1986	Artificial Paradise
1986	By the Lake
1986	Coming up for Air
1986	Fake Fruit Factory
1995/2011	Señora con Flores / Woman with Flowers
