= Ashley Hans Scheirl =

Austrian transgender artist and filmmaker

Hans Scheirl, also known as A. Hans Scheirl, Angela Scheirl, Hans Angela Scheirl or Ashley Hans Sheirl, (born 1956) is a transgender artist and filmmaker from Salzburg, Austria.

Scheirl first began his transition at the age of 40 with testosterone shots. He currently identifies as "boy, drag-king, transvestite, transgender...[and] insect." He has also performed in some experimental groups including the music group "8 oder 9" in Vienna in 1978. Scheirl's films use "the cinematic apparatus as a technology for perverting representation". He outlines his work as "cyber-cinema for the trans-X patriarchal fin-de-millenium."

== Education ==
In 1975 he attended the Academy of Fine Arts in Vienna, Austria and received a diploma in Conservation and Technology of Art in 1980. In 2003 Scheirl received a master's degree in Art Studies at Central Saint Martins College of Art and Design in London, England.

== Career ==
=== Film ===
In 1979 Scheirl directed 52 super-8 films and two short films in 1986. He also directed two short 16mm films in 1988. In 1991 he co-directed, co-edited, and performed in Flaming Ears (1991), and directed Dandy Dust (1998). Scheirl is known to use film as a medium to experiment with gender and identity, often through montage, and relates some of his film to the "cyborg" identity. He has also stated that his intention with film is to create a new medium of communication through film. Scheirl had taken part in numerous films including Venus Boyz (2002) by Gabriel Baur, Pansexual Public Porn (1998) by Del laGrace Volcano, and the Making of Dandy Dust (2001) by Tina Keane.

==== Flaming Ears (1991) ====
Also known as Rote Ohren fetzen durch Asche, Flaming Ears is an 83-minute post-apocalyptic feature film directed by A. Hans Scheirl, Ursula Pürrer, and Dietmar Schipek. The film focuses on three women, Spy, Volley, and Nun in the city of Asche in the year 2700 and draws on themes of romantics and lesbianism.

==== Dandy Dust (1998) ====
Dandy Dust is a 94-minute experimental sci-fi feature film directed, written, and produced by Scheirl. The film features a gender fluid cyborg character that time travels to discovers parts of past self-consciousness. This film features a fragmented plot, nudity, stop motion animation, gritty visuals, and themes of sex and sexuality through the use of bodily fluids and prosthetic reproductive organs. Characters in the film include Dandy Dust, Super Mother Cyniborg XVII Duchess of Loft & Spire, Sir Sidore, and Spider Cunt Boy.

=== Art ===
Scheirl has been creating paintings since 1995 and became the Professor for "Contextual Painting" at the Academy of Fine Arts in Vienna, Austria in 2006.

== Filmography ==
| Year | Title | Co-Directors | Length |
|---|---|---|---|
| 1979 | Straßbilder | | 11 min |
| 1979 | Ein ester Lebensmittelfilm | | 5 min |
| 1979 | Hände Hoch! | | 160 sec |
| 1979 | Artistin in de Zirkuskuppel und Hezattacke | | 110 sec |
| 1980 | Men & Masks 2 | | 2 min |
| 1980 | Noch Kokoseis | | 3 min |
| 1980 | Saxofone & Spione | | 5 min |
| 1980 | Charles tanzt | | 3 min |
| 1980 | Paris | | 1 min |
| 1980 | Meyva Suyu | | 40 sec |
| 1980 | Gerüstfilm | | 3 min |
| 1980 | For Men` | | 1 min |
| 1981 | Straße II | | Loop |
| 1981 | The Ascension | | 4 min |
| 1981 | Tigerin | | 2 min |
| 1981 | Bei dieser Geschwindigkeit fetzen die Haare | | 3 min |
| 1983 | Musikfilm: DNA | | 2 min |
| 1983 | Jocasta taucht auf | | 5 min |
| 1983 | Orlando | | 3 min |
| 1983 | Frau Zemo | | 9 min |
| 1984 | anna alpha nacht | | 15 min |
| 1984 | Men & Masks II | | 4 min |
| 1984 | Ostern '84 | Ursula Pürrer | 6 min |
| 1984 | Piß in Rosa | Ursula Pürrer | 2 min |
| 1984 | Bauchtanz | Ursula Pürrer | 5 min |
| 1984 | Wald- und Wiesenfilm | Ursula Pürrer | 3 min |
| 1984 | Anna Wackelt | Ursula Pürrer | 2 min |
| 1984 | Metall & Blumen | Ursula Pürrer | 3 min |
| 1984 | Sex & Crime | Ursula Pürrer | 3 min |
| 1984 | Kampf und Kuß | Ursula Pürrer | 3 min |
| 1984 | Hochhaus & Reißverschluß | Ursula Pürrer | 1 min |
| 1984 | Nacht-Plakat-U-Bahn | Ursula Pürrer | 5 min |
| 1984 | Maria Meistert Metall und Anna Arbeitet Anständig | Ursula Pürrer | 3 min |
| 1984 | LGP | Ursula Pürrer | 3 min |
| 1985 | Body Building (with Zora Marie Bauer) | Ursula Pürrer | 3 min |
| 1985 | Das Schwarze Herz Tropft - Bastelanleitung zu - rinnen | Ursula Pürrer | 11 min |
| 1985 | Gezacktes Rinnsal schleicht sich schamlos schenkelnässend an | Ursula Pürrer | 4 min |
| 1985 | Im Garten der Gelben G. | Ursula Pürrer | 9 min |
| 1985 | Rhabarber & Zucker | Ursula Pürrer | 1 min |
| 1985 | Ein Schlauchboot & Austern | Ursula Pürrer | 3 min |
| 1985 | Super-8 Girl-Games | Ursula Pürrer | 2 min |
| 1985 | Rote Schnitte und die Luft dazwischen | Ursula Pürrer | 4 min |
| 1985 | Gleichzetig nackt | | 2 min |
| 1986 | Im Original farbig | Ursula Pürrer | 14 min |
| 1986 | Slocking Walkman (music video) | Ursula Pürrer Dietmar Schipek | 2 min |
| 1989 | The Abbotess & the Flying Bone (16mm) | Dietmar Schipek | 18 min |
| 1990 | Die Vampirin auf der Kraftwagenbedarfsstation (35mm) (Cinema-Spot for Mörderinnen Film Festival) | Ursula Pürrer Dietmar Schipek | 35 sec |
| 1992 | Rote Ohren fetzen durch Asche (Flaming Ears) (16mm) | Ursula Pürrer Dietmar Schipek | 84 min |
| 1993 | The Savings Pouch (TV-Spot for First Sex Channel 4 U.K.) | | 1 min |
| 1994 | Dandy Dust - The Showreel | | 6 min |
| 1995 | Summer of 1995 | Jewels Barker | 10 min |
| 1995 | Dandy Dust - The Trailer | | 10 min |
| 1996 | 1/2 Frösche Ficken Flink | | 17 min |
| 1998 | Dandy Dust (16mm) | | 94 min |

== Awards ==
In 2012, Scheirl received the "Kunstpreis der Stadt Wien" and the "Jane Bowles Serious Elegance CHEAPy Underground Über Alles for Sci-fi DIY Aesthetic Innovation and Gender Creative Visionary Art" awards.
