= San Francisco Cinematheque =

American film society

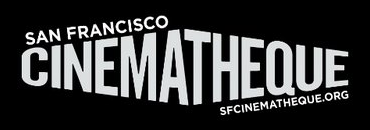
- Predecessor: Canyon Cinema
- Formation: 1961; 65 years ago
- Type: 501(c)(3)
- Tax ID no.: 94-2361837
- Legal status: Nonprofit organization
- Location: San Francisco, California, United States
- Director: Steve Polta
- Website: www.sfcinematheque.org

San Francisco Cinematheque is a San Francisco-based film society for artist-made cinema. It was created in 1961 by a group of filmmakers, including Bruce Baillie and Chick Strand. This screening program grew into Canyon Cinema before being split off into a sister organization, originally named the Foundation for Art in Cinema, during the 1970s.

San Francisco Cinematheque is one of the Bay Area's longest-running outlets for exhibiting experimental film. It produces the annual film festival Crossroads.

== History ==
Canyon Cinema began as a film exhibition outlet in Canyon, California. Its early programs were programmed by Bruce Baillie, Chick Strand, and Emory Menefee and featured a mixture of experimental work and conventional narrative films. After starting in Baillie's backyard, they struggled to find a regular venue until Stiles Hall at UC Berkeley became its first long-term venue. As Canyon grew during the 1960s to include a distribution office and nationwide newsletter, its exhibition program came to focus on experimental film and appeared at new venues around the Bay Area. It moved into a church on Union Street in 1967 and took on the name Canyon Cinematheque. The film department at San Francisco Art Institute had a theater built in 1969, which became the primary venue for Cinematheque screenings for several decades.

Canyon Cinema obtained nonprofit status in California but was denied by the federal government because its distribution program made a profit for its members. As a result, Canyon restructured its operations, and in 1976 the Foundation for Art in Cinema was formed as a sister organization. Under Steve Anker and David Gerstein in the 1980s, the foundation took on the name San Francisco Cinematheque. The organization expanded its scope with its first video art programs in 1984 and Cinematograph, a journal edited by local artists, the following year. The Cinematheque moved to the Yerba Buena Center for the Arts as its primary venue in 1994 and then to California College of the Arts in 1999.

== Description ==
San Francisco Cinematheque exhibits artist-made cinema with around 35 screenings each year in the Bay Area. It publishes the Cinematograph journal of film and media art. It also has a collection of thousands of publications, periodicals, and files in its research archive.

== Crossroads ==
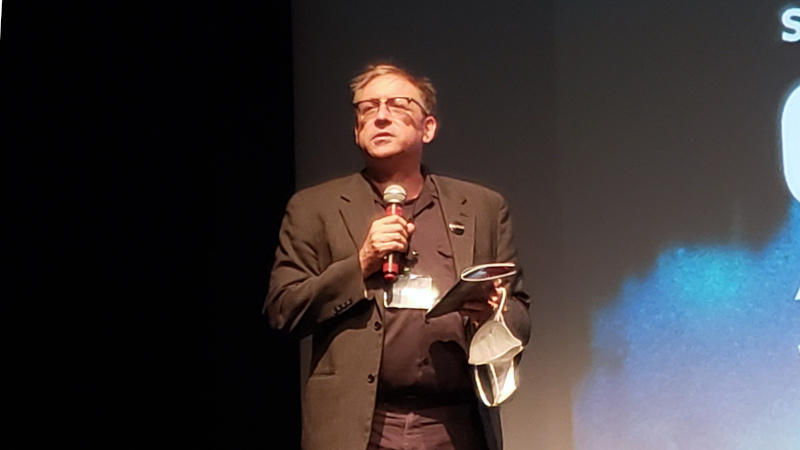
San Francisco Cinematheque director Steve Polta presenting Crossroads 2022

In April 2010, San Francisco Cinematheque presented the first Crossroads, a film festival for artist-made film and video work. Crossroads has since become an annual festival offering, alongside works by established practitioners in the field of artist-made cinema, a major platform for performance-based work and younger or lesser-known filmmakers.
