= Huckleberry Botanic Regional Preserve =

Nature reserve in the US

Coordinates: 37.845°N 122.19°W

- Location within Oakland, California Location within California Location within the United States
- Type: Botanical preserve
- Location: San Francisco Bay Area, California
- Nearest city: Oakland, California
- Area: 241 acres (0.98 km^{2})
- Operator: East Bay Regional Park District

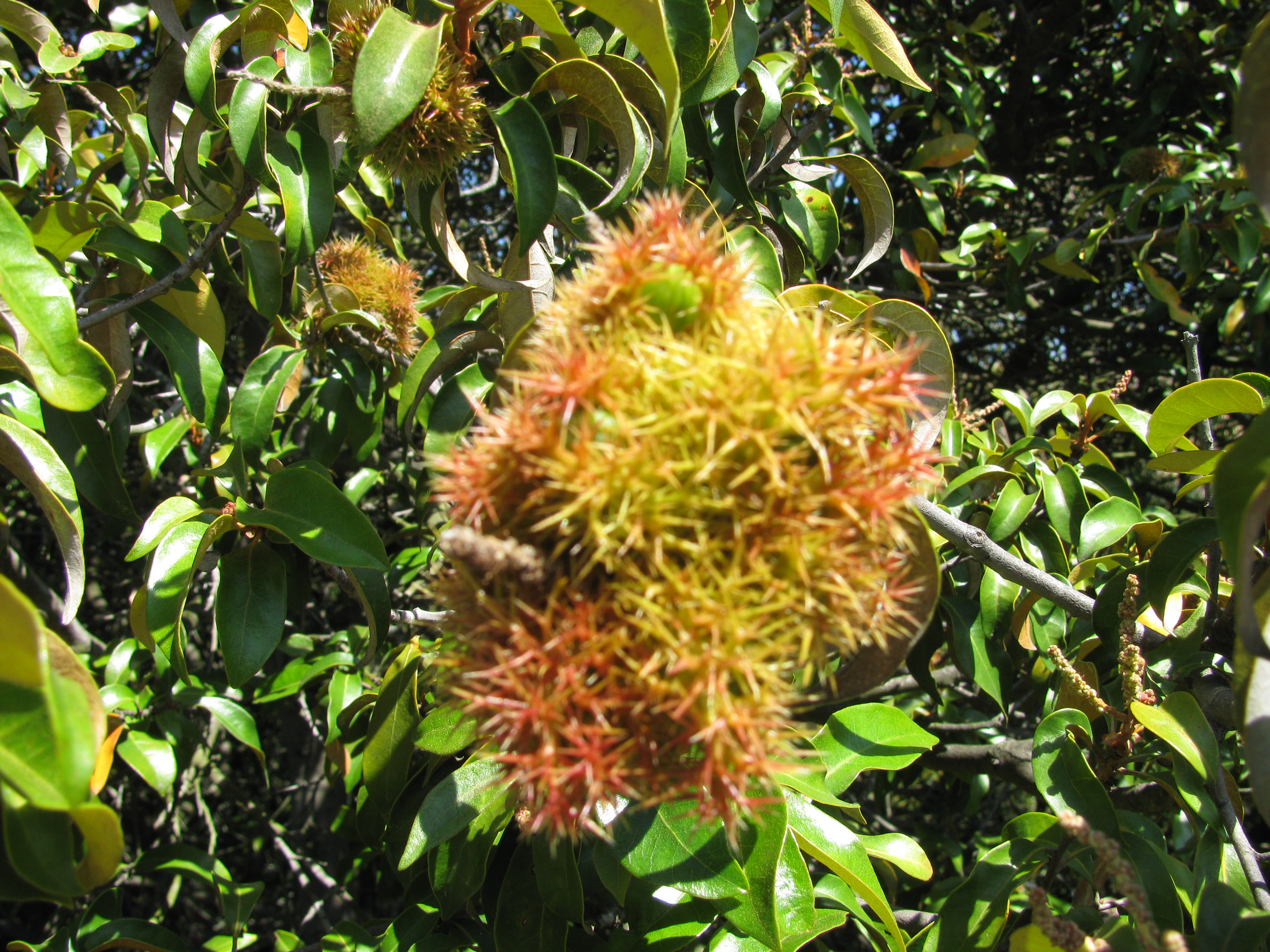
Golden chinquapin (Chrysolepis chrysophylla), at the Preserve

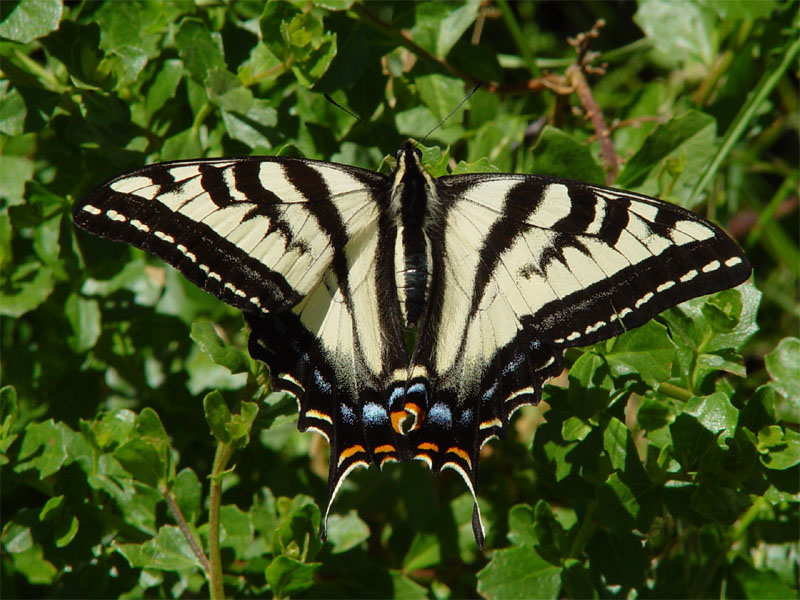
Pale Swallowtail butterfly (Papilio eurymedon) at the Huckleberry Botanic Preserve

Huckleberry Botanic Regional Preserve is a 241 acres (0.98 km^{2}) regional park and nature reserve in the Oakland Hills, in the eastern East Bay (San Francisco Bay Area) region of the San Francisco Bay Area of California. It is within Alameda and Contra Costa Counties. It is a park within the East Bay Regional Parks District system. The Preserve is named after the California Huckleberry (Vaccinium ovatum) which grows abundantly within its habitat.

== Geography ==
The Huckleberry Botanic Regional Preserve is on the crest of the Oakland Hills, located above Oakland and Orinda. It represents a relic plant association found only in certain areas along the coastal climate region of California, where specific soil and climatic conditions still exist. It is a very diverse botanical area for native plants of the mixed evergreen forest and montane chaparral and woodlands ecoregions and plant communities. Trails connect the preserve with Robert Sibley Volcanic Regional Preserve on the north, and Redwood Regional Park on the south.

The Huckleberry Trail is a 1.7 miles (2.7 km) self-guided nature path that loops through the Preserve. Besides the California Huckleberry, other plants include the Golden chinquapin (Chrysolepis chrysophylla), western leatherwood, Douglas iris, wood fern and western sword fern. Trees include California Bay (Umbellularia californica), Coast live oak (Quercus agrifolia), pallid manzanita, brittleleaf manzanita, and California hazelnut.

== Visitation ==
The park is open year-round, between 5:00 AM and 10:00 PM daily, unless otherwise posted. No dogs are permitted in the park because of the sensitive plant habitat. There are no reservable campgrounds or picnic sites. Parking is free.

== See also ==
- California mixed evergreen forest
- List of California native plants
- Vaccinium ovatum
