= Canyon Cinema =

American non-profit film corporation

- Formation: 1967; 59 years ago
- Founders: Bruce Baillie
- Founded at: Canyon, California
- Type: 501(c)(3)
- Tax ID no.: 46-0649341
- Legal status: Nonprofit organization
- Location(s): San Francisco, California, United States
- Executive director: Brett Kashmere
- Website: canyoncinema.com

Canyon Cinema is an American nonprofit organization for distributing independent, avant-garde, and artist-made films. After starting in the 1960s as an exhibition program, it grew to include a nationwide newsletter and a distribution cooperative. Its exhibition activities were split off to form the San Francisco Cinematheque.

== History ==
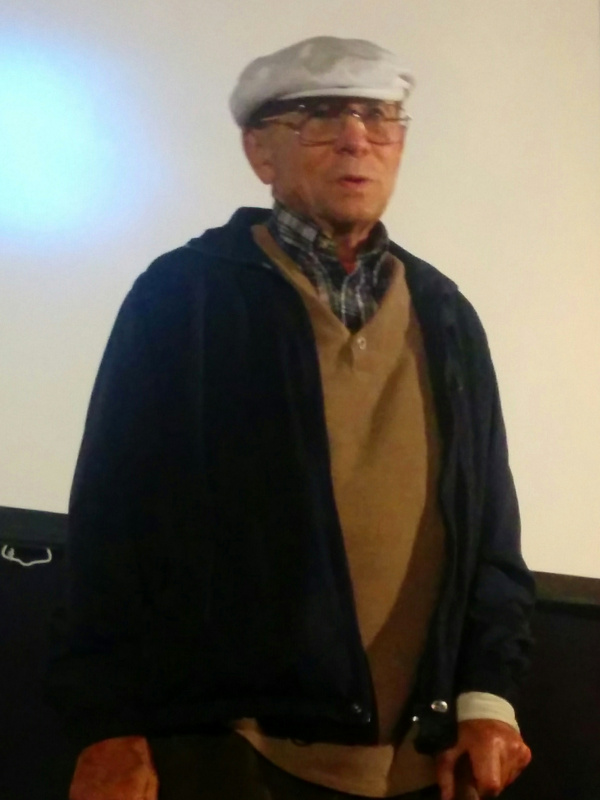
Co-founder Bruce Baillie at a Canyon Cinema Salon screening in 2016

Canyon Cinema informally began in 1960 as an exhibition outlet in Canyon, California. Filmmaker Bruce Baillie got a projector and army surplus screen to put on shows in his backyard. Chick Strand and Ernest Callenbach became involved, and they began holding screenings around the Bay Area. Programming was intended to distribute the work of experimental filmmakers' that otherwise were not accepted by mainstream distributors. Early programming included popular cinema, particularly from Castle Films, and avant-garde cinema but over time came to focus exclusively on the latter.

Callenbach, an editor for Film Quarterly, had the idea to publish a regular newsletter. The first issue of the News came in December 1962, and the publication later became the Cinemanews and the Canyon Cinema News.

Distribution activities began in 1966 with the establishment of a film distribution office. The Canyon Cinema Cooperative formally incorporated on February 26, 1967. Later that year, the growing exhibition program was made into Canyon Cinematheque. Income from distribution declined during the 1970s, resulting in a reorganization of Canyon's operations. The cinematheque was split off as San Francisco Cinematheque, which obtained nonprofit status in 1977.

Canyon expanded its mission in 1994 to include the sale of videotapes. It later began offering DVDs for sale as well.

Stanford University obtained Canyon's business archives, including Cinemanews, in 2010. In 2013 the Canyon Cinema corporation was dissolved, following the transfer of its assets and operations to the Canyon Cinema Foundation, a 501(c)(3) nonprofit.

== Description ==
Canyon Cinema distributes a collection of more than 3,400 works from approximately 280 artists. These include 8 mm, Super 8, 16 mm, and 35 mm film prints as well as digital media. It holds a free salon series at the New Nothing Cinema.
