= New Hollywood =

1960s–1980s American film movement

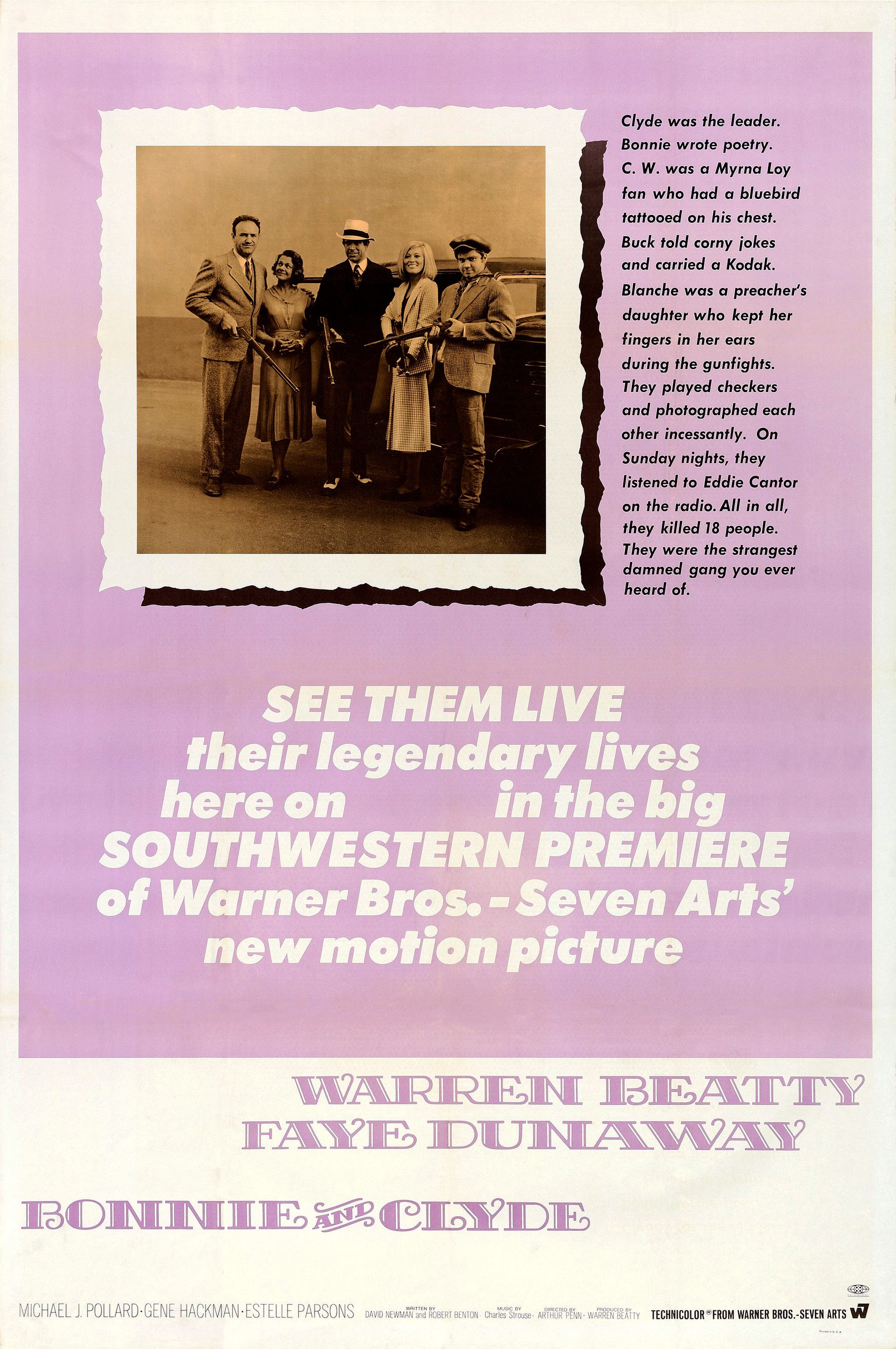
- Bonnie and Clyde (1967), one of the films that defined New Hollywood
- Years active: mid-1960s to early 1980s
- Location: United States
- Influences: Classical Hollywood cinema; French New Wave; Italian cinema; Japanese cinema; Art film; Experimental film; Direct cinema; Golden Age of Television (1950s); B movies; American independent film
- Influenced: Cinéma du look; Poliziotteschi; American eccentric cinema; Peak TV; Neo-noir

The New Hollywood, Hollywood Renaissance, or American New Wave, was a movement in American film history from the mid-1960s to the early 1980s, when a new generation of filmmakers came to prominence. They influenced the types of film produced, their production and marketing, and the way major studios approached filmmaking.

It was precipitated by the demise of the studio system and the rise of television, after which the commercial success of films was diminished. In New Hollywood films, the film director, rather than the studio, took on a key authorial role.

The definition of "New Hollywood" varies, depending on the author, with some defining it as a movement and others as a period. The span of the period is also a subject of debate, as well as its integrity, as some authors, such as Thomas Schatz, argue that the New Hollywood consists of several different movements. The films made in this movement are stylistically characterized in that their narrative often deviated from classical norms.

Successful films of the early New Hollywood era include Bonnie and Clyde, The Graduate, and Easy Rider while films whose box office failure marked the end of the era include New York, New York, Sorcerer, Heaven's Gate, They All Laughed, and One from the Heart.

== History ==
=== Background ===
In fact, The Wild Angels was kind of a... it was a big success for the New Hollywood. It was Roger Corman, it was Peter Fonda, Nancy Sinatra, it was a New Hollywood kind of movie, and it was very anti-the Old Hollywood, it was very hard-edged, violent, you know, it was not at all an Old Hollywood movie. And I didn't, I wasn't particularly aware of it. Then the following year was Bonnie and Clyde. Shadows had come out in the early '60s, so that was really the first sign of a kind of off-Hollywood movement.
– Peter Bogdanovich

Following the Paramount Case (which ended block booking and ownership of theater chains by film studios) and the advent of television (where Gore Vidal, Rod Serling, John Frankenheimer, Arthur Penn, Paddy Chayefsky and Sidney Lumet worked in their earlier years), (Note: Attributed to multiple sources:) both of which severely weakened both the traditional studio system and the Motion Picture Production Code (or the Hays Code), Hollywood studios initially used spectacle to retain profitability. Technicolor developed a far more widespread use, while widescreen processes and technical improvements, such as CinemaScope, stereo sound, and others, such as 3-D, were invented to retain the dwindling audience and compete with television. However, these were generally unsuccessful in increasing profits. By 1957, Life magazine called the 1950s "the horrible decade" for Hollywood. It was dubbed a "New Hollywood" by a press.

In the 1950s and early 1960s, Hollywood was dominated by musicals, historical epics, and other films that benefited from the larger screens, wider framing, and improved sound. However, audience shares continued to dwindle, and had reached alarmingly low levels by the mid-1960s. Several costly flops, including Doctor Dolittle, Tora! Tora! Tora! and the Julie Andrews vehicle Star!, each failed attempts to replicate the success of Mary Poppins, Doctor Zhivago and The Sound of Music, put great strain on the studios. Both British and American press dismissed filmmakers Alfred Hitchcock and Howard Hawks as "frivolous entertainers and nothing more" while praising more respectable "models of American art films" like Stanley Kramer's Judgment at Nuremberg. American underground cinema was usually regarded as "marginal and parochial" even with the debut features of John Cassavetes (Shadows in 1959) and Shirley Clarke (The Connection in 1961) as both were being praised by Esquire film critic Dwight Macdonald (despite being hostile to other underground titles like Jonas Mekas's 1963 manifestation Guns of the Trees).

By the time the Baby Boomer generation started to come of age in the mid-late 1960s, "Old Hollywood" was rapidly losing money; the studios were unsure how to react to the much-changed audience demographics. The change in the market during the period went from a middle-aged high school-educated audience in the mid-1960s to a younger, more affluent, college-educated demographic: by the mid-1970s, 76% of all movie-goers were under 30, 64% of whom had gone to college. European films, both arthouse and commercial (especially the Commedia all'italiana, the French New Wave, the Spaghetti Western), and Japanese cinema were making a splash in the United States – the huge market of disaffected youth seemed to find relevance and artistic meaning in movies like Michelangelo Antonioni's Blowup, with its oblique narrative structure and full-frontal female nudity.

The desperation felt by studios during this period of economic downturn, and after the losses from expensive movie flops, led to innovation and risk-taking, allowing greater control by younger directors and producers. Therefore, in an attempt to capture that audience that found a connection to the "art films" of Europe, the studios hired a host of young filmmakers and allowed them to make their films with relatively little studio control. Some of whom, like actor Jack Nicholson, Dennis Hopper (who also was the main lead in Curtis Harrington's 1961 supernatural thriller Night Tide, distributed by Corman's American International Pictures) and director Peter Bogdanovich, were mentored by "King of the Bs" Roger Corman while others like celebrated cinematographer Vilmos Zsigmond worked for lesser-known B movie directors like Ray Dennis Steckler, known for the 1962 Arch Hall Jr. vehicle Wild Guitar and the 1963 horror musical flick The Incredibly Strange Creatures Who Stopped Living and Became Mixed-Up Zombies. This, together with the breakdown of the Hays Code following the Freedman v. Maryland court case in 1965 and the new ratings system in 1968 (reflecting growing market segmentation) set the scene for the New Hollywood.

=== Bonnie and Clyde and The Graduate ===
A defining film of the New Hollywood generation was Bonnie and Clyde (1967). Produced by and starring Warren Beatty and directed by Arthur Penn, its combination of graphic violence and humor, as well as its theme of glamorous disaffected youth, was a hit with audiences. The film eventually won Academy Awards for Best Supporting Actress (Estelle Parsons) and Best Cinematography.

When Jack L. Warner, then-CEO of Warner Bros. Pictures, first saw a rough cut of Bonnie and Clyde in the summer of 1967, he hated it. Distribution executives at Warner Bros. agreed, giving the film a low-key premiere and limited release. Their strategy appeared justified when Bosley Crowther, middlebrow film critic at The New York Times, gave the movie a scathing review. "It is a cheap piece of bald-faced slapstick comedy," he wrote, "that treats the hideous depredations of that sleazy, moronic pair as though they were as full of fun and frolic as the jazz-age cut-ups in Thoroughly Modern Millie..." Other notices, including those from Time and Newsweek magazines, were equally dismissive.

Its portrayal of violence and ambiguity in regard to moral values, and its startling ending, divided critics. Following one of the negative reviews, Time magazine received letters from fans of the movie, and according to journalist Peter Biskind, the impact of critic Pauline Kael in her positive review of the film (October 1967, New Yorker) led other reviewers to follow her lead and re-evaluate the film (notably Newsweek and Time). Kael drew attention to the innocence of the characters in the film and the artistic merit of the contrast of that with the violence in the film: "In a sense, it is the absence of sadism — it is the violence without sadism — that throws the audience off balance at Bonnie and Clyde. The brutality that comes out of this innocence is far more shocking than the calculated brutalities of mean killers." Kael also noted the reaction of audiences to the violent climax of the movie, and the potential to empathize with the gang of criminals in terms of their naiveté and innocence reflecting a change in expectations of American cinema.

The cover story in Time magazine in December 1967, celebrated the movie and innovation in American New Wave cinema. This influential article by Stefan Kanfer claimed that Bonnie and Clyde represented a "New Cinema" through its blurred genre lines, and disregard for honored aspects of plot and motivation, and that "In both conception and execution, Bonnie and Clyde is a watershed picture, the kind that signals a new style, a new trend." Biskind states that this review and turnaround by some critics allowed the film to be re-released, thus proving its commercial success and reflecting the move toward the New Hollywood. The impact of this film is important in understanding the rest of the American New Wave, as well as the conditions that were necessary for it.

Also released the same year was another era-defining hit about the celebration of youthful rebellion The Graduate, starring Anne Bancroft and Dustin Hoffman, with soundtrack by the popular folk duo Simon & Garfunkel and directed by Mike Nichols (for which he won the film's sole Oscar for Best Director), about Benjamin, a young college graduate rejecting the traditional values of his parents and their hypocritical society alongside a future in "plastics".

These initial successes paved the way for the studio to relinquish almost complete control to these young filmmakers. In the mid-1970s, idiosyncratic, startlingly original films such as Paper Moon, Dog Day Afternoon, Chinatown, and Taxi Driver, among others, enjoyed critical and commercial success. These successes by the members of the New Hollywood led each of them in turn to make more and more extravagant demands, both in the studios and eventually on the audience.

== Characteristics ==
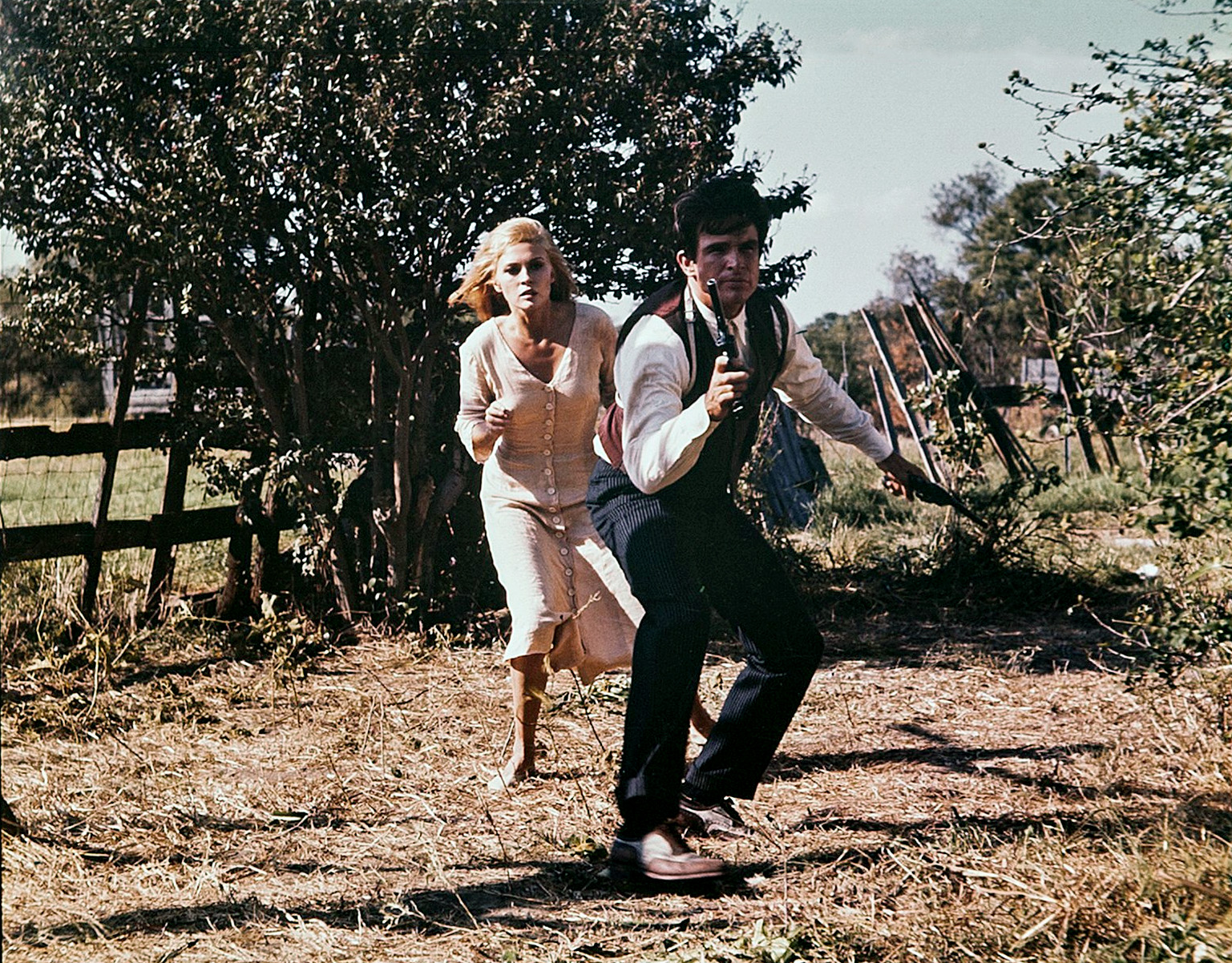
Bonnie and Clyde (1967)

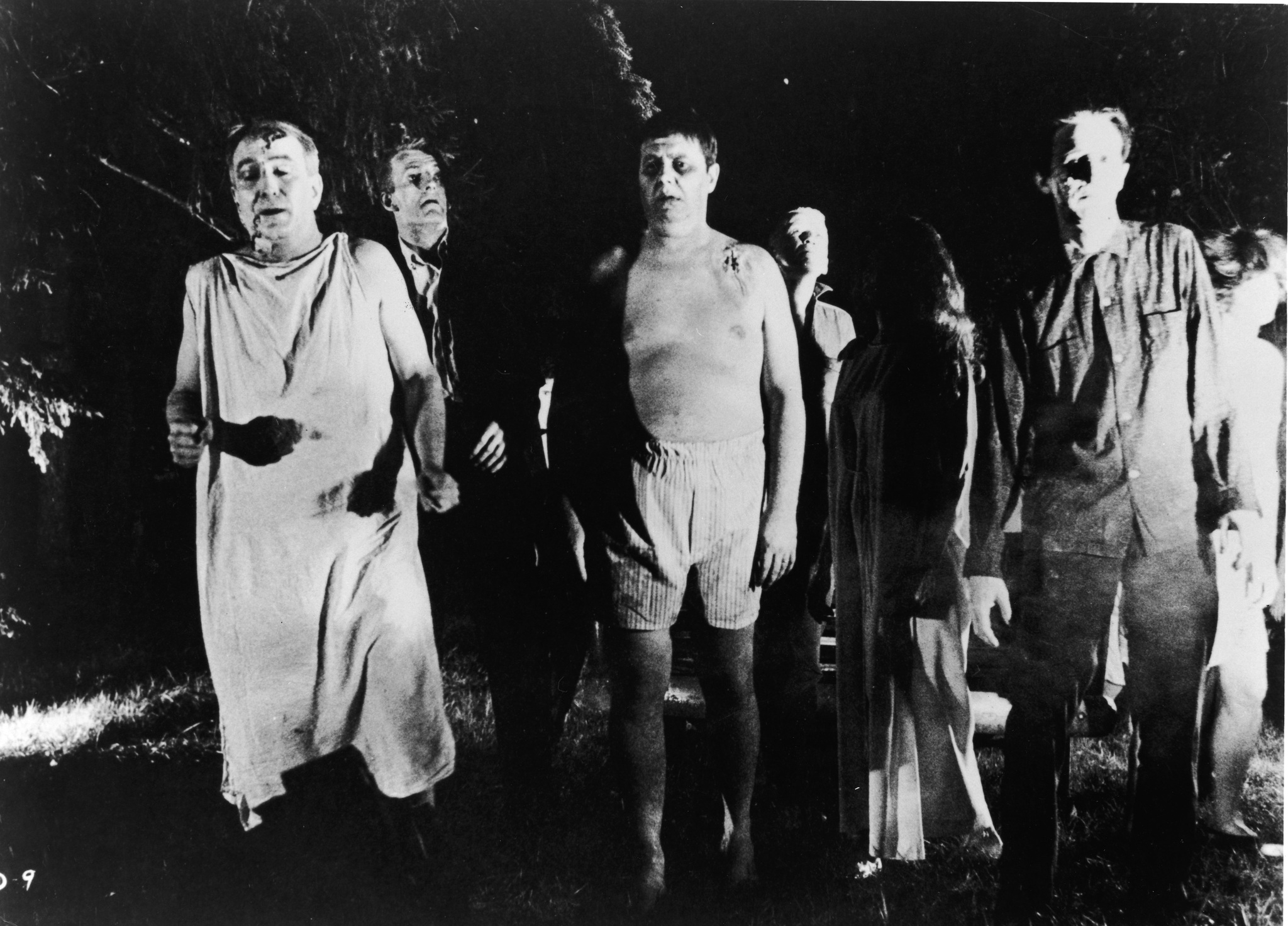
Night of the Living Dead (1968)

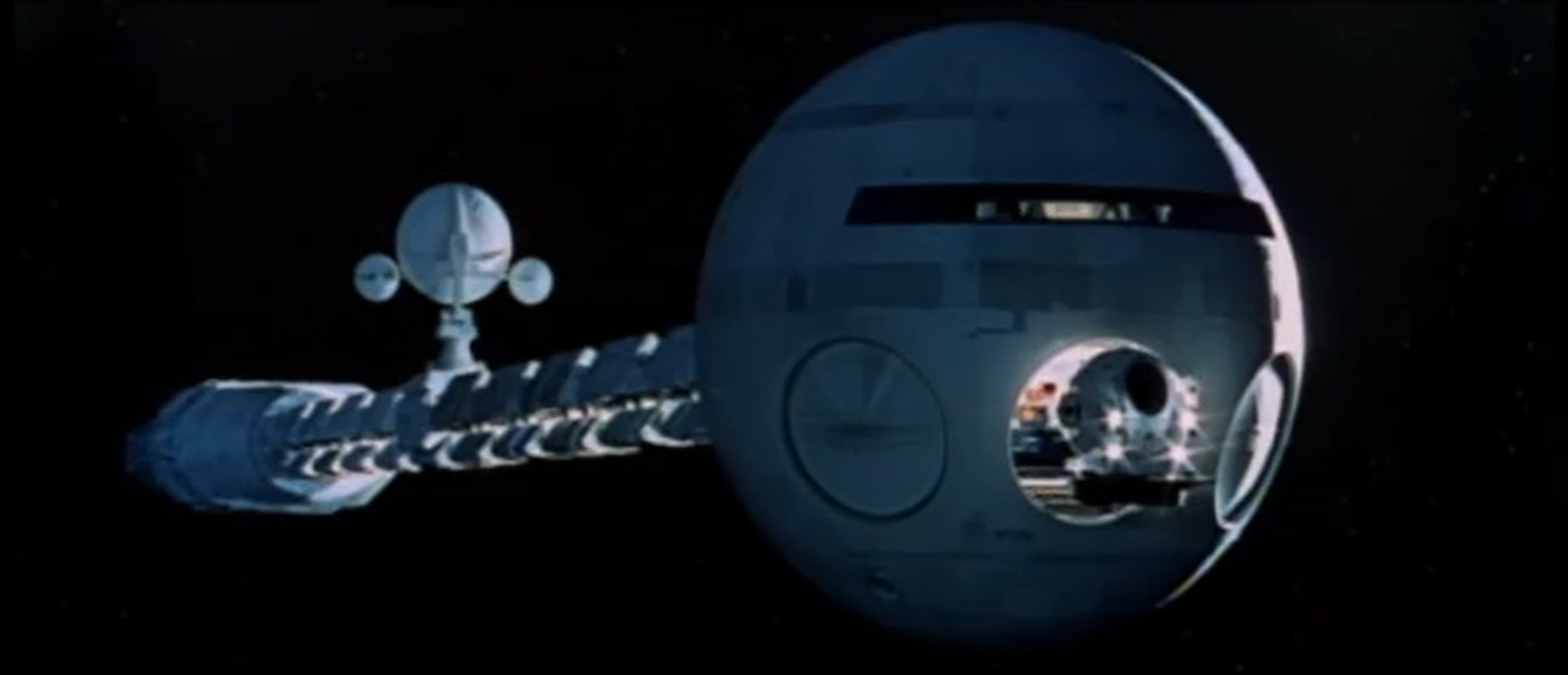
2001: A Space Odyssey (1968)

The new generation of Hollywood filmmakers was most importantly, from the studios' view, young, therefore able to reach the youth audience they were losing. This collective of actors, screenwriters and directors, dubbed the "New Hollywood" by the press, briefly changed the business from the producer-driven Hollywood system of the past as Todd Berliner has written about the period's unusual narrative practices.

The 1970s, Berliner says, marks Hollywood's most significant formal transformation since the conversion to sound film and is the defining period separating the storytelling modes of the studio era and contemporary Hollywood. New Hollywood films deviate from classical narrative norms more than Hollywood films from any other era or movement. Their narrative and stylistic devices threaten to derail an otherwise straightforward narration. Berliner argues that five principles govern the narrative strategies characteristic of Hollywood films of the 1970s:

- Seventies films show a perverse tendency to integrate, in narrative incidental ways, story information and stylistic devices counterproductive to the films' overt and essential narrative purposes.
- Hollywood filmmakers of the 1970s often situate their film-making practices in between those of classical Hollywood and those of European and Asian art cinema.
- Seventies films prompt spectator responses more uncertain and discomforting than those of more typical Hollywood cinema.
- Seventies narratives place an uncommon emphasis on irresolution, particularly at the moment of climax or in epilogues, when more conventional Hollywood movies busy themselves tying up loose ends.
- Seventies cinema hinders narrative linearity and momentum and scuttles its potential to generate suspense and excitement.

Seventies cinema also dealt with female identity in the era of second wave feminism, masculine crises featuring flawed male characters, downbeat conclusions and pessimistic subject matters (Note: Attributed to multiple sources:) alongside emotional realism in female identity stories, negative attitudes toward authoritative institutions and other aspects of American life and hard-nosed depictions of an America reeling from tense conflicts like The Vietnam War and President Richard Nixon's Watergate scandal. Some New Hollywood titles like Hopper's acid western The Last Movie and Brian De Palma's musical Phantom of the Paradise had more eccentric characteristics including indulgent storylines and dizzying disregard of genre conventions.

Thomas Schatz points to another difference with the Hollywood Golden Age, which deals with the relationship of characters and plot. He argues that plot in classical Hollywood films (and some of the earlier New Hollywood films like The Godfather) "tended to emerge more organically as a function of the drives, desires, motivations, and goals of the central characters". However, beginning with mid-1970s, he points to a trend where "characters became plot functions".

During the height of the studio system, films were made almost exclusively on set in isolated studios. The content of films was limited by the Motion Picture Production Code, and though golden-age film-makers found loopholes in its rules, the discussion of more taboo content through film was effectively prevented. The shift towards a "new realism" was made possible when the Motion Picture Association of America film rating system was introduced and location shooting was becoming more viable. New York City was a favorite spot for this new set of filmmakers due to its gritty and grimy atmosphere.

Because of breakthroughs in film technology (e.g. the Panavision Panaflex camera, introduced in 1972; the Steadicam, introduced in 1976), the New Hollywood filmmakers could shoot 35mm camera film in exteriors with relative ease. Since location shooting was cheaper (no sets need to be built) New Hollywood filmmakers rapidly developed the taste for location shooting, resulting in a more naturalistic approach to filmmaking, especially when compared to the mostly stylized approach of classical Hollywood musicals and spectacles made to compete with television during the 1950s and early 1960s. The documentary films of D.A. Pennebaker, Emile de Antonio, the Maysles Brothers and Frederick Wiseman, among others, also influenced filmmakers of this era.

However, in editing, New Hollywood filmmakers adhered to realism more liberally than most of their classical Hollywood predecessors, often using editing for artistic purposes rather than for continuity alone, a practice inspired by European art films and classical Hollywood directors such as D. W. Griffith and Hitchcock. Films with unorthodox editing included Easy Rider's use of jump cuts (influenced by the works of experimental collage filmmaker Bruce Conner) to foreshadow the climax of the movie, as well as subtler uses, such as those to reflect the feeling of frustration in Bonnie and Clyde, the subjectivity of the protagonist in The Graduate and the passage of time in the famous match cut from 2001: A Space Odyssey. Dense sound design was also commonplace during this era.

Also influential were the works of experimental and structural filmmakers Arthur Lipsett, Stan Brakhage, Bruce Baillie, Jordan Belson, John Whitney, Scott Bartlett, Maya Deren, Andy Warhol, Michael Snow and Kenneth Anger with their combinations of music and imagery and each were cited by George Lucas, Francis Ford Coppola and Martin Scorsese as influences. The New Hollywood generation of directors and screenwriters (each educated at either USC, UCLA, NYU and AFI) such as Coppola, Lucas, Scorsese, Steven Spielberg, John Milius and Paul Schrader were sometimes jokingly labeled as "Movie Brats" or "Young Turks".

The end of the production code enabled New Hollywood films to feature anti-establishment political themes, the use of rock music, and sexual freedom deemed "counter-cultural" by the studios. The youth movement of the 1960s turned anti-heroes like Bonnie and Clyde and Cool Hand Luke into pop-culture idols, and Life magazine called the characters in Easy Rider "part of the fundamental myth central to the counterculture of the late 1960s." Easy Rider also affected the way studios looked to reach the youth market. The success of Midnight Cowboy, in spite of its "X" rating, was evidence for the interest in controversial themes at the time and also showed the weakness of the rating system and segmentation of the audience.

== Interpretations on defining the movement ==
For Peter Biskind, the new wave was foreshadowed by Bonnie and Clyde and began in earnest with Easy Rider. Biskind's book Easy Riders, Raging Bulls argues that the New Hollywood movement marked a significant shift towards independently produced and innovative works by a new wave of directors, but that this shift began to reverse itself when the commercial success of Jaws and Star Wars led to the realization by studios of the importance of blockbusters, advertising and control over production (even though the success of The Godfather was said to be the precursor to the blockbuster phenomenon).

Writing in 1968, critic Pauline Kael argued that the importance of The Graduate was in its social significance in relation to a new young audience, and the role of mass media, rather than any artistic aspects. Kael argued that college students identifying with The Graduate were not too different from audiences identifying with characters in dramas of the previous decade. She also compared this era of cinema to "tangled, bitter flowering of American letters in the 1850s".

Filmmaker Quentin Tarantino identified in his 2022 book Cinema Speculation that:

"regular moviegoers were becoming weary of modern American movies. The darkness, the drug use, the embrace of sensation-the violence, the sex, and the sexual violence. But even more than that, they became weary of the anti-everything cynicism... Was everything a bummer? Was everything a drag? Was every movie about some guy with problems?"

In 1980, film historian/scholar Robert P. Kolker examined New Hollywood film directors in his book A Cinema of Loneliness: Penn, Kubrick, Coppola, Scorsese, Altman, and how their films influenced American society of the 1960s and 1970s. Kolker observed that "for all the challenge and adventure, their films speak to a continual impotence in the world, an inability to change and to create change."

John Belton points to the changing demographic to even younger, more conservative audiences in the mid 1970s (50% aged 12–20) and the move to less politically subversive themes in mainstream cinema, as did Thomas Schatz, who saw the mid- to late 1970s as the decline of the art cinema movement as a significant industry force with its peak in 1974–75 with Nashville and Chinatown.

Geoff King sees the period as an interim movement in American cinema where a conjunction of forces led to a measure of freedom in filmmaking yet also pointed out that scholarships about the era tend to center on two versions: the auteur-driven indie and blockbuster eras. Todd Berliner says that 70s cinema resists the efficiency and harmony that normally characterize classical Hollywood cinema and tests the limits of Hollywood's classical model.

According to author and film critic Charles Taylor (Opening Wednesday at a Theater or Drive-In Near You), he stated that "the 1970s remain the third — and, to date, last — great period in American movies". Author and film critic David Thomson also shared similar sentiments, to the point of dubbing the era "the decade when movies mattered".

Video essayist Leigh Singer wrote that this celebrated period revered the epic dramas and serious state-of-the-nation addresses "made by homebred auteurs" (The Last Picture Show, The Godfather, Chinatown, Nashville, Network and Taxi Driver) over less respectable genre pictures.

Author A.D. Jameson (I Find Your Lack of Faith Disturbing), on the other hand, claimed that Star Wars was New Hollywood's finest achievement that actually embodied the characteristics of the respected "serious, sophisticated adult films" while questioning the often-told critical narrative of said "last great decade of American cinema".

Author Julie A. Turnock, in her book Plastic Reality, stated that one common explanation as to why both Star Wars and Close Encounters succeeded was that each film offered hopeful optimism for troubling times as opposed to the "doom and gloom" cinema of the era that audiences were getting tired of with emphasis on mistrust in authority, pessimistic and fatalistic views of the future and anti-heroic aimlessness.

Columbia University professor Elanor Johnson tracked down six horror classics (Rosemary's Baby, The Exorcist, The Stepford Wives, The Omen, Alien and The Shining) made during this era from a feminist perspective in her 2025 book Scream with Me: Horror Films and the Rise of American Feminism 1968–1980.

Nathan Rabin, writing for an article commemorating the movie's 40th anniversary at Boston.com in 2015, contested that Jaws, despite being labeled by conventional wisdom as the film that killed the quirky New Hollywood, didn't feel like one by today's vantage point.

The Austrian Film Museum, which held a 2013 program entitled The Real Eighties featuring some New Hollywood titles like The King of Comedy, Blow Out and American Gigolo, stated that:

All ills spring from the 1980s. A transitional decade that witnessed the film industry's restructuring along the lines of President Reagan's neoliberal agenda, the eighties did away with the last remnants of New Hollywood while laying the foundations for today's High Concept wasteland – thus goes an all too familiar tale of decline. The retrospective The Real Eighties questions this commonplace of film history and sides with the mainstream of Hollywood cinema: filmic realisms of the 1980s – in immediate proximity to the dream factories of Steven Spielberg or George Lucas, yet at odds with the decade's political and aesthetic imperatives – await rediscovery.

Daniel Joyaux, writing for Roger Ebert.com on the Criterion Collection's 2024 release of the 1983 Tom Cruise classic Risky Business, shared similar concerns:

There's a long-held belief about Hollywood history that, from basically the moment Heaven's Gate nearly bankrupted United Artists in 1980 to the moment Sex, Lies, and Videotape kicked off the indie boom of the '90s, studio executives had an almost pathological aversion to any movie with artistic ambition. There's at least some truth to this, and seminal texts like Peter Biskind's 1998 book Easy Riders, Raging Bulls have cooked those kernels of truth into a full-blown mythologizing of '70s and '90s Hollywood, while the '80s remain largely dismissed as a creative wasteland.

In their 2022 book We Are the Mutants: The Battle for Hollywood from Rosemary's Baby to Lethal Weapon, authors Kelly Roberts, Michael Grasso and Richard McKenna argued that the dominant narrative, the myth about "outlaws" taking over Hollywood to form the last and best "golden age" of American cinema, was created in large part to the conventional wisdom of the emerging film critic industry canonizing the auteurs instead of recognizing that they were destined to be the "new bosses" alongside overshadowing independent films coming out from the same era that also tackled the country's psychic mood. They also reinterpreted The Texas Chainsaw Massacre as a allegory about capitalist violence and the decline of traditional American industry, The Exorcist as a backlash to Women's Lib and Silent Running as an exposé on the solipsistic American counterculture.

Steven Hyden, writing for Grantland, called the Movie Brats the "cinematic version" of classic rock, to the point of roll calling Spielberg as the Beatles, Scorsese as the Velvet Underground, Coppola as Bob Dylan, Lucas as Pink Floyd, Robert Altman as Neil Young, Brian De Palma as Led Zeppelin, Bogdanovich as the Beach Boys and Hal Ashby as the Kinks.

In his 2026 book Last Kings of Hollywood, author Paul Fischer declared that Speilberg "speaks the language of the camera better than anybody else", depicted Lucas as a sellout "who lost his BS detector and has drunk his own Kool-Aid" and claiming that Coppola "was the hardest one to pin down" pointing out his self-indulgent philandering and "willingness to treat the creative life as if it's an experiment".

Stephen Vagg, writing for Filmink, argued that studios such as Cinema Center Films were very much part of New Hollywood but did not receive credit because they were short lived operations and/or owned by television networks.

Paul Thomas Anderson's 1997 film Boogie Nights, about the "golden age" of the adult film industry, can be seen as an allegory of the demise of this era.

== Criticism ==
Los Angeles Times article film critic Manohla Dargis described New Hollywood as the "halcyon age" of 1970s filmmaking, that "was less revolution than business as usual, with rebel hype". She also pointed out in her New York Times article that the era's enthusiasts insist this was "when American movies grew up (or at least starred underdressed actresses); when directors did what they wanted (or at least were transformed into brands); when creativity ruled (or at least ran gloriously amok, albeit often on the studio's dime)."

Molly Haskell, in her book From Reverence to Rape: The Treatment of Women in the Movies, described how this era of cinema "with its successive revelations, progressed like a stripper, though awkwardly—like a novice in a hurry to get off the stage".

This era was also infamous for its excessive decadence and on-set mishaps (as was the case for Apocalypse Now when the tumultuous production was documented by Eleanor Coppola which in turn became her 1991 documentary Hearts of Darkness: A Filmmaker's Apocalypse). (Note: Attributed to multiple sources:) Incidents plaguing the behind-the-scenes of some of the horror films from this era (such as Rosemary's Baby, The Exorcist, Twilight Zone: The Movie, Poltergeist and The Omen) were also the subjects for the docuseries Cursed Films. Even Spielberg, who co-directed/co-produced Twilight Zone with John Landis, was so disgusted by the latter's handling of a deadly helicopter accident that resulted in the death of three actors (Vic Morrow and two Vietnamese children), that he ended their friendship and publicly called for the end of New Hollywood. (De Palma and Friedkin shared similar sentiments about the crash.) When approached by the press about the accident, he stated:

"No movie is worth dying for. I think people are standing up much more now, than ever before, to producers and directors who ask too much. If something isn't safe, it's the right and responsibility of every actor or crew member to yell, 'Cut!'

Turner Classic Movies personality John Malahy, in his book Rewinding the '80s, noted that a growing problem with this era was the director's ego spending millions on elaborate cinematic dreams that almost no one shared (e.g. Cimino's Heaven's Gate).

The Golden Raspberry Awards — better known as The Razzies — emerged during the twilight of this era dishonoring productions such as Freidkin's Cruising and Cimino's Heaven's Gate alongside two megamusicals responsible for setting up the awards: Xanadu and Can't Stop the Music, the latter of which eventually became the first recipient of Golden Raspberry Award for Worst Picture).

== Legacy ==
The films of New Hollywood influenced future mainstream and independent filmmakers such as Quentin Tarantino, Edgar Wright, Paul Thomas Anderson and Noah Baumbach. Todd Phillips's 2019 DC Comics adaptation Joker, alongside the film's period setting, was inspired by the Martin Scorsese classics Taxi Driver and The King of Comedy, while Alexander Payne's 2023 film The Holdovers took inspiration from Ashby's works. Tarantino's 2019 Academy Award-winning Once Upon a Time in Hollywood lamented the end of the Golden Age while signalling the beginning of this era. The Godfather Part III; Texasville; and The Two Jakes—each released in 1990—count as "sequels" to three New Hollywood classics, respectively: The Godfather Part II; The Last Picture Show; and Chinatown. (The sequels were directed respectively by Francis Ford Coppola; Peter Bogdanovich; and Jack Nicholson, who played the lead in Polanski's 1974 neo-noir and reprises his role here in The Two Jakes.)

Such films also influenced both the Poliziotteschi genre and discoploitation films in Italy, and a decade later the Cinéma du look movement in France. The narrative for the 1983 British shot-on-video film Suffer Little Children was influenced in part by Brian De Palma's Carrie and John Carpenter's Halloween.

American Eccentric Cinema has been noted as influenced by this era. Both traditions have similar themes and narratives of existentialism and the need for human interaction. New Hollywood focuses on the darker elements of humanity and society within the context of the American Dream in the mid-1960s to the early 1980s, with themes that were reflective of sociocultural issues and were centered around the potential meaninglessness of pursuing the American Dream as generation upon generation was motivated to possess it. In comparison, American Eccentric Cinema does not have a distinct context, as its films show characters who are very individual and their concerns are very distinctive to their own personalities.

The New American Cinema has been ripe for parody, as in Peter Jackson's 1989 Muppet satire Meet the Feebles (spoofing the Russian Roulette scene from The Deer Hunter); Ernie Fosselius's spoofs Hardware Wars (1978) and Porklips Now (1980); Jim Reardon's cult 1986 animated student film Bring Me the Head of Charlie Brown, spoofing Taxi Driver, The Wild Bunch, and Bring Me the Head of Alfredo Garcia; and Canadian video artist Todd Graham's 1987 cult fan film Apocalypse Pooh, a bizarrely comedic mash-up of Disney's Winnie the Pooh and Coppola's Apocalypse Now.

"New Hollywood" is also the name of a 1990 NBC News special hosted by Tom Brokaw about the then "new" Hollywood industry of the 1980s and early 1990s making epic mainstream blockbusters, personal mid-budget fare and smaller independent efforts. (Note: Attributed to multiple sources:)

== See also ==
- Blaxploitation – Film genre
- Counterculture of the 1960s – Anti-establishment cultural phenomenon
- A Decade Under the Influence – The 2003 documentary about the New Hollywood
- Easy Riders, Raging Bulls – Peter Biskind's controversial account of this era of filmmaking
- Exploitation film – Popular during that time
- Vetsploitation – Film genre about an ex-military fighter as a key character
- Hippie exploitation films – Film genre
- L.A. Rebellion – Alternative African-American cinema in the 1970s–1980s
- List of New Wave movements
- Midnight movie – Popular during this era
- Modernist film – Film genre
- Vulgar auteurism – Movement in latter-day cinephilia and film criticism
- Z Channel: A Magnificent Obsession – 2004 documentary about the troubled life of programmer Jerry Harvey and his California-based movie channel that aired director's cut editions of films such as The Wild Bunch and Heaven's Gate
