= Script doctor =

Writer hired to rewrite an existing script

A script doctor is a writer or playwright hired by a film, television, or theatre production company to rewrite an existing script or improve specific aspects of it, including structure, characterization, dialogue, pacing, themes, and other elements. They are usually brought in for scripts that have been almost "green-lit" during the development and pre-production phases of a film to address specific issues with the script, as identified by the financiers, production team, and cast.

Script doctors generally do their work uncredited for a variety of commercial and artistic reasons. For instance, to receive credit under the Writers Guild of America screenwriting credit system requires a second screenwriter to contribute more than 50 percent of an original screenplay or 33 percent of an adaptation. As script doctors generally do not contribute enough to a screenplay to qualify to the guild, production companies are not compelled to provide them with credit. Some script doctors will also work uncredited due to artistic reasons, including not wanting to be associated with projects which fail despite their intervention.

== Examples ==
Many screenwriters have done uncredited work on screenplays:

- Paul Attanasio: Speed (1994), Air Force One (1997), Armageddon (1998), Patch Adams (1998), Town & Country (2001), and The Bourne Ultimatum (2007). "I really enjoy doing them. I basically analogize it to being the closer in baseball. There's something about the nature of that kind of pressure, where you're coming in at the ninth inning and throwing your fastball to three batters and leaving, that's exhilarating," Attanasio is quoted as saying in a 2002 Los Angeles Times article.
- Al Boasberg: The General (1926), A Night at the Opera (1935) and A Day at the Races (1937).
- Carrie Fisher: Hook (1991), Sister Act (1992), Lethal Weapon 3 (1992), Last Action Hero (1993), The River Wild (1994), and The Wedding Singer (1998). An Entertainment Weekly article from May 1992 described Fisher as "one of the most sought-after doctors in town." When asked if she was still working as a script doctor in December 2008, she said: "I haven't done it for a few years. I did it for many years, and then younger people came to do it and I started to do new things. It was a long, very lucrative episode of my life. But it's complicated to do that. Now it's all changed, actually. Now in order to get a rewrite job, you have to submit your notes for your ideas on how to fix the script. So they can get all the notes from all the different writers, keep the notes and not hire you. That's free work and that's what I always call life-wasting events."
- Ben Hecht: Twentieth Century (1934), A Star Is Born (1937), Angels with Dirty Faces (1938), Gone with the Wind (1939), Stagecoach (1939), Foreign Correspondent (1940), Cornered (1945), Gilda (1946), Rope and Cry of the City (1948), Strangers on a Train (1951), Angel Face (1952), and Cleopatra (1963). According to a November 1999 article from The Guardian, "[Uncredited script doctoring is] a tradition that goes back to the mighty Ben Hecht. Hecht was a snob, and hanging out at the Algonquin with Dorothy Parker, it suited him to downplay his movie work, so he only received credit for about half of the 100 plus films he worked on."
- Herman J. Mankiewicz: Monkey Business (1931), Horse Feathers (1932), Million Dollar Legs (1932), The Wizard of Oz (1939)
- Tom Mankiewicz: The Deep (1977), The Spy Who Loved Me (1977), Superman (1978), Moonraker (1979), and Superman II (1980). He was credited as "creative consultant" on Superman by director Richard Donner. In a June 2012 interview, Robert Crane, who co-wrote Mankiewicz's autobiography My Life as a Mankiewicz (2012), said: "I think script doctoring was an in road for him. People had liked what they'd seen with the Bond films, especially the dialogue. I think that caught the attention of agents and studio heads, and they said, 'I want Mankiewicz to come in here and work on this project.' He spent a lot of time at Warner Brothers and Universal working on scripts."
- Elaine May: Reds (1981), Tootsie (1982), and Labyrinth (1986).
- John Sayles: Apollo 13 (1995) and Mimic (1997). Sayles has stated that the script doctor's main role is to help others tell their stories. He decides which jobs to accept based on whether there is a germ of an idea for a movie he would actually like to see. He has also stated that he works harder when writing for others than he does on his own work.
- Aaron Sorkin: Schindler's List (1993), The Rock (1996), Excess Baggage (1997), and Enemy of the State (1998). In an October 2010 interview, Sorkin told a journalist: "With the script doctoring, I did it for Jerry Bruckheimer for a while, because I was just going through a period where I was having a very difficult time coming up with my own ideas and I was climbing the walls. So I did what is called 'the production polish', where you are brought into the last two weeks on something that you are not emotionally invested in, where it is not your job to break the story, to come up with the moving parts and plot points. Basically, they just wanted some snappy dialogue for Sean Connery and Nicolas Cage. The first time I did it, actually, was for Schindler's List where no-one is looking for snappy dialogue, but the writer of that movie had gone on to direct a picture and there was a little more work that [director Steven Spielberg] wanted done before it went to Poland to begin shooting. He asked me to come in and do that, but you are obviously more interested in your own thing."
- Sir Tom Stoppard: Indiana Jones and the Last Crusade (1989), Sleepy Hollow (1999), and The Bourne Ultimatum (2007). On The Bourne Ultimatum, Stoppard said in October 2007, "I wrote a script for [director] Paul Greengrass. Some of the themes are still mine—but I don't think there's a single word of mine in the film." According to an April 2010 interview with The Guardian, Stoppard "does uncredited script-doctoring on Hollywood movies, 'about once a year': most recently he worked on Paul Greengrass's The Bourne Ultimatum. 'The second reason for doing it is that you get to work with people you admire. The first reason, of course, is that it's overpaid.' Once, hearing the phone ring at home while in the shower, he took a call from [director] Steven Spielberg on the set of Schindler's List, agonising over a scene in Steven Zaillian's script. Standing naked, Stoppard improvised a solution that was used in the movie. He remains bemused by this American habit of invisible script revision. 'I actually got quite angry with Spielberg, who was and is a good friend, and told him just to film Zaillian's script. But Steven, like a lot of other people in movies, tends to think one more opinion can't hurt.'" He also said, "I used to worry about it enormously, but it's a different culture. It's a moral issue, almost. A few years ago, I was invited to a film festival, as a freebie, because I'd done so much work on a movie that they said I should be there. And I said: 'I can't do that, because I'm not supposed to be on this film, and it's unfair to the chap whose name is on it.' But it just goes with the territory: these are the conditions one works under out there."
- Quentin Tarantino: It's Pat (1994) and Crimson Tide (1995).
- Robert Towne: Bonnie and Clyde (1967), The Godfather (1972), and Armageddon (1998). Author Peter Biskind writes in Easy Riders, Raging Bulls (1998) that Francis Ford Coppola asked Towne if he wanted credit for his contributions to the screenplay of The Godfather, and Towne replied: "Don't be ridiculous. I only wrote a couple of fuckin' scenes. If you win an Oscar, thank me." Coppola won the Academy Award for Best Writing (Adapted Screenplay) and thanked Towne.
- Joss Whedon: Speed (1994), The Quick and the Dead (1995), Waterworld (1995), Twister (1996), and X-Men (2000). In a September 2001 interview, Whedon said: "Most of the dialogue in Speed is mine, and a bunch of the characters", adding that he was arbitrated out of credit. He also spoke about Waterworld and X-Men: "I refer to myself as the world's highest-paid stenographer. This is a situation I've been in a bunch of times. [...] Waterworld was a good idea, and the script was the classic, 'They have a good idea, then they write a generic script and don't really care about the idea.' When I was brought in, there was no water in the last 40 pages of the script. It all took place on land, or on a ship, or whatever. I'm like, 'Isn't the cool thing about this guy that he has gills?' And no one was listening. I was there basically taking notes from [Kevin Costner], who was very nice, fine to work with, but he was not a writer. And he had written a bunch of stuff that they wouldn't let their staff touch. So I was supposed to be there for a week, and I was there for seven weeks, and I accomplished nothing. I wrote a few puns, and a few scenes that I can't even sit through because they came out so bad. It was the same situation with X-Men. They said, 'Come in and punch up the big climax, the third act, and if you can, make it cheaper.' That was the mandate on both movies, and my response to both movies was, 'The problem with the third act is the first two acts.' But, again, no one was paying attention. [...] And then, in X-Men, not only did they throw out my script and never tell me about it; they actually invited me to the read-through, having thrown out my entire draft without telling me."
- Steven E. de Souza: 48 Hrs. (1982) and Judge Dredd (1995). In a 2013 interview published by Den of Geek, de Souza acknowledged his role as a script doctor. "I still get brought on to fix screenplays that I had nothing to do with. When a movie is about to be shot and they hire me to come in and fix the script and punch it up at the last minute. In addition, I’m like a patient resuscitator who they can hire secretly after a movie has had a horrible test to rewrite some scenes and re-cut the movie so they can make it good enough to get to home video. That’s my secret identity."

== See also ==
- Ghostwriter
- Dramaturgy
