= Reddy Kilowatt =

Cartoon mascot

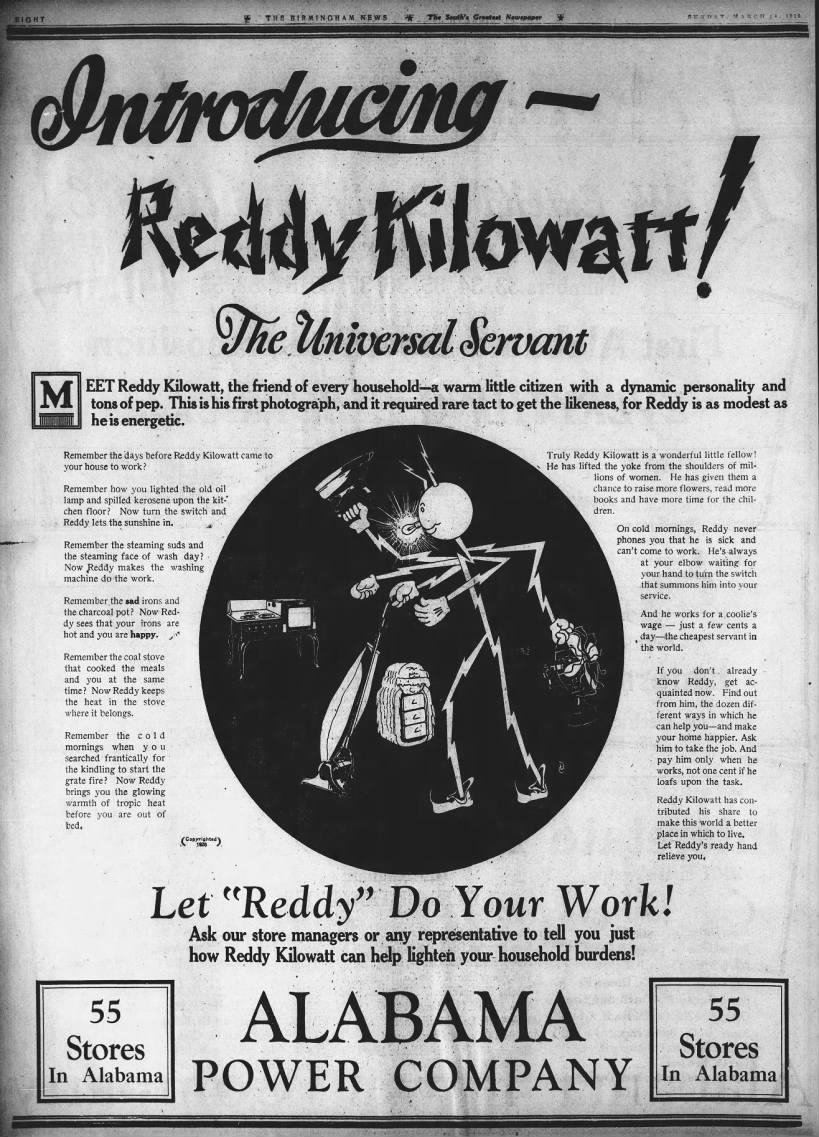
- Reddy Kilowatt's debut in a 1926 advertisement by the Alabama Power Company
- First appearance: March 14, 1926; 100 years ago
- Created by: Ashton B. Collins Sr.
- Portrayed by: Walter Tetley
- Company: Xcel Energy

In-universe information
- Nicknames: Your Electric Servant; The Mighty Atom
- Gender: Male
- Occupation: Electric utility ambassador

Reddy Kilowatt is a cartoon character that served as a corporate spokesman for electricity generation in the United States and other countries for over 100 years. Currently, the Reddy Kilowatt trademark is owned by Xcel Energy.

== Description ==
Reddy Kilowatt is drawn as a stick figure whose body, limbs, and hair are made of stylized lightning bolts and whose bulbous head has a light bulb for a nose and wall outlets for ears.

== Conception ==
Reddy Kilowatt made his first published appearance on March 14, 1926, in an advertisement in The Birmingham News for the Alabama Power Company (APC). The character was created by the company's 40-year-old commercial manager, Ashton B. Collins Sr.

Like other electric utilities of the period, APC was seeking to grow consumer demand for electrical power. Commercially viable AC generating stations had begun powering North American streets and homes by the end of the 19th century. By the mid-1920s, electric utilities had succeeded in bringing electricity to virtually all major cities and towns in North America; however, rural areas remained chronically underserved. In 1930, almost 90% of farms in the United States were still without access to electric service. Collins was convinced that the best way to win over new customers, including frugal small business owners and skeptical farmers and rural dwellers, was to give his mostly invisible new commodity a more human face.

According to corporate lore, Collins found his inspiration in a dramatic Alabama lightning storm. As he watched the electric discharges strike the ground, he imagined the dancing limbs of a powerful creature, one that could be harnessed in the service of the public. He turned to a colleague, APC engineer Dan Clinton, to create the first drawings of Reddy Kilowatt, an “electrical servant” with lightning bolt arms and legs, wearing safety gloves and shoes. He added a friendly face with a light bulb nose and wall outlets for ears. Reddy's original design had five arms, representing electricity's ability to be everywhere at once.

APC copyrighted the character on March 6, 1926. Over the next few years, Reddy appeared in print advertising for the company. He made his first three-dimensional appearance at the Alabama Electrical Exposition of 1926.

== 1930s to early 1940s ==
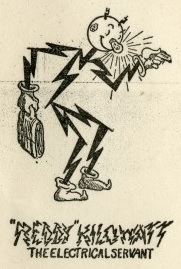
Image of Reddy Kilowatt, 1933: U.S. trademark 302,093

The onset of the Great Depression in 1929 would further suppress demand for new electric services and slow progress toward rural electrification. Collins remained convinced that the Reddy Kilowatt character could be a powerful promoter of electric power. A lifelong advocate for capitalism, Collins was alarmed by growing government intervention in the sector and also saw Reddy as an ambassador for investor-owned utility companies (IOUs).

In 1933, IOUs banded together to advance their interests, forming the Edison Electric Institute. Collins joined the new organization, traveling across the United States to promote the use of electrical energy. APC gave Collins the rights to the character he created. He asked a family friend, Dorothea Warren (1914–1999), to refine Reddy Kilowatt's image. On March 28, 1933, Collins was granted trademark number 302,093 by the U.S. Patent Office. Warren would go on to become a prolific commercial artist and author of children's books.

Under the umbrella of the Reddy Kilowatt Service (RKS), Collins used his interactions with other IOUs to promote what he called the “Reddy Kilowatt Program”. He entered into his first licensing agreement with the Philadelphia Electric Company in January 1934. Over the next couple of years, Collins would add several other major utilities including Ohio Edison Company, PPL Corporation, Duke Power, South Carolina Power Company and Tennessee Electric Power Company.

RKS entered into a contract with each licensee. The original 1934 version was amended in 1941, 1953, 1963, 1968, 1971 and 1976. In signing the contract, the licensing IOU promised to always represent Reddy Kilowatt as “genial, likeable, well-mannered [and] even-tempered” and to abide by “generally accepted standards of good taste.”

In exchange, the licensee was guaranteed a range of products and services by RKS. The most important of these came to be known as the Reddy Kilowatt Art Service Reproduction Proofs Book, a catalogue of Reddy Kilowatt images, applications and stock advertisements that could be used or customized by the utility to promote its electrical services. Using the Proofs Book as a guide, companies could order mat service sheets and layout art to meet their needs. By the time of its final edition in 1998, the book had grown to hundreds of pages, containing thousands of images. RKS also produced a periodical called the Reddy Bulletin, containing news and promotional ideas for licensees.

Collins recognized early that Reddy Kilowatt's appeal extended to other countries. He first sought and obtained trademark protection for the character in Canada in 1934 and subsequently in Argentina (1937), Great Britain (1938), and Mexico (1938). Over the years, Reddy would be licensed extensively in the Caribbean, South America, Australia, Africa, and Asia.

== Late 1940s to 1960s ==
With the impending end of hostilities in the final months of World War II, utility companies prepared to return to a consumer-driven economy, and to respond to 15 years of demand for new household appliances. Demand for electric power jumped 14% between 1946 and 1947 alone. An important driver was that, even as demand for electrical energy increased, the cost of energy continued to decline. When Reddy was created in the mid-1920s, a kilowatt-hour cost 55 cents (in 1992 dollars). By 1947, it had fallen to 19 cents, and it would continue to fall over the ensuing two decades. Ashton Collins saw that Reddy Kilowatt could play an important role in promoting electrical use in a period of post-war prosperity, but recognized a need to refine the character's image. As early as 1943, Collins approached American animator Walt Disney in a bid to adapt Reddy for film. However, the studio was heavily involved in producing films for the U.S. military at the time and the project did not proceed.

Reddy Kilowatt, 1946, as adapted by the Walter Lantz studio

Two years later, Collins approached another noted animator, Walter Lantz, with the idea of starring Reddy on the big screen. Lantz, whose characters like Woody Woodpecker and Andy Panda were well known to theatre-goers of the period, agreed, releasing the short film Reddy Made Magic in March 1946. Lantz and Collins shared producing credits on the film, which was directed by Dick Lundy, a former Disney animator. The screenplay, by Ben Hardaway and Milt Schaffer, featured the story of the creation of electricity as told by Reddy Kilowatt. In conjunction with the film version of Reddy Made Magic, Educational Comics produced a companion comic book with a cover price of five cents and the subtitle The amazing true story of electricity. Reddy's movie voice was provided by Walter Tetley, a voiceover actor who was in demand by producers needing a high-pitched, adolescent sound. Tetley's credits included the voice of Sherman in The Adventures of Rocky and Bullwinkle and Friends.

Lantz later made further contributions to the appearance of Reddy Kilowatt. Prior to 1946, Reddy Kilowatt was usually portrayed as a lanky and sometimes awkward-looking creature. Lantz's animators refined Reddy's look to make his body shorter and more proportional. Reddy's wide-cuffed, five-fingered safety gloves were replaced with four-fingered white gloves of the type traditionally worn by Mickey Mouse and other popular cartoon creatures. The Lantz artists broadened Reddy's grin and added whites to his eyes to increase his range of expression.

The Lantz film included a song, sung by Walter Tetley as Reddy. It was later used in advertising and commercial applications by licensees. Called simply “Reddy Kilowatt”, the song was written by jazz artist Del Porter and Oscar-nominated composer Darrell Calker. Its catchy lyric concluded:

I wash and dry your clothes, play your radios, I can heat your coffee pot, I am always there, with lots of power to spare, ’cause I’m REDDY KILOWATT!

In 1953, Collins incorporated RKS as Reddy Kilowatt, Inc., (RKI) establishing its head office in New York City. The company continued to provide a range of products and services to licensees. In addition to the Proofs Book, RKI produced a handbook with guidelines to assist utilities in using Reddy to their advantage. Around 1942, the Reddy News, a glossy periodical that highlighted successes and best practices of RKI licensees, replaced the Reddy Bulletin.

RKI continued to aggressively promote its Reddy Kilowatt trademarks worldwide. By 1957, 222 utility companies around the world had licensed use of the character. By the end of the '60s, it's estimated that the number of RKI licensees totalled about 300 worldwide.

Throughout this period, RKI was a prolific producer of promotional materials and incentives, broadly distributed by licensees. Trinkets ranging from men's and women's jewellery, writing instruments and lighters, to oven mitts, aprons and playing cards, featured Reddy Kilowatt's consistently smiling face. Collins’ prime objective remained unchanged: to provide a human, accessible face to the business of energy generation. The theme is evident in RKI art from the time: a winded Reddy running uphill to demonstrate the stress of rising costs; Reddy in hunting togs warning shooters away from power lines; a smiling Reddy framing a power bill as his “wages”.

Reddy Kilowatt explains an electricity bill, c. 1959

RKI continued to advance Collins' pro-capitalist ideology. The company encouraged licensees to spread this message to young people. Beginning in the late 1940s, utilities began to sponsor “Reddy Kilowatt Youth Clubs”, incorporating educational activities with capitalist messages. At the same time, RKI distributed stock advertisements with right-wing political messages for use by licensees. Among the promotions for electric heat and appliances were images of a visibly sweating Reddy warning that government ownership of utilities is “Socialism – the twin brother of Communism – and we don’t want either of those isms!”

RKI took steps to vigorously protect its intellectual property. In 1956, RKI sued the National Rural Electric Cooperative Association, an association of cooperative-owned utilities, for trademark infringement. Four years earlier, the organization had introduced Willie Wiredhand, a character with a body of electric cable and electric plug feet. On January 7, 1957, the court ruled the characters were different and dismissed the complaint.

In 1958, John Sutherland Productions updated Reddy Made Magic for the atomic age, producing the short film The Mighty Atom. The film incorporated some footage from Reddy Made Magic. As before, the film's release was followed by a companion comic book. The film updated the Reddy Kilowatt theme song to declare, "I'm in your T-V set with every show you get!"

A singing and dancing Reddy Kilowatt was featured in an animated show called “Holiday with Light” in the Tower of Light exhibit at the 1965 New York World's Fair (together with a lightbulb-shaped Benjamin Franklin).

In 1962, Collins turned the presidency of RKI over to son Ashton B. Collins Jr. (1932–2014), although the senior Collins remained chairman of RKI until his death in 1972. Much of the day-to-day work of RKI was led by the company's corporate secretary, Louise M. Bender (1917–2005). Ray Crosby served as the company's art director from 1934 to 1964. RKI employed about 30 people at its peak.

== Decline ==
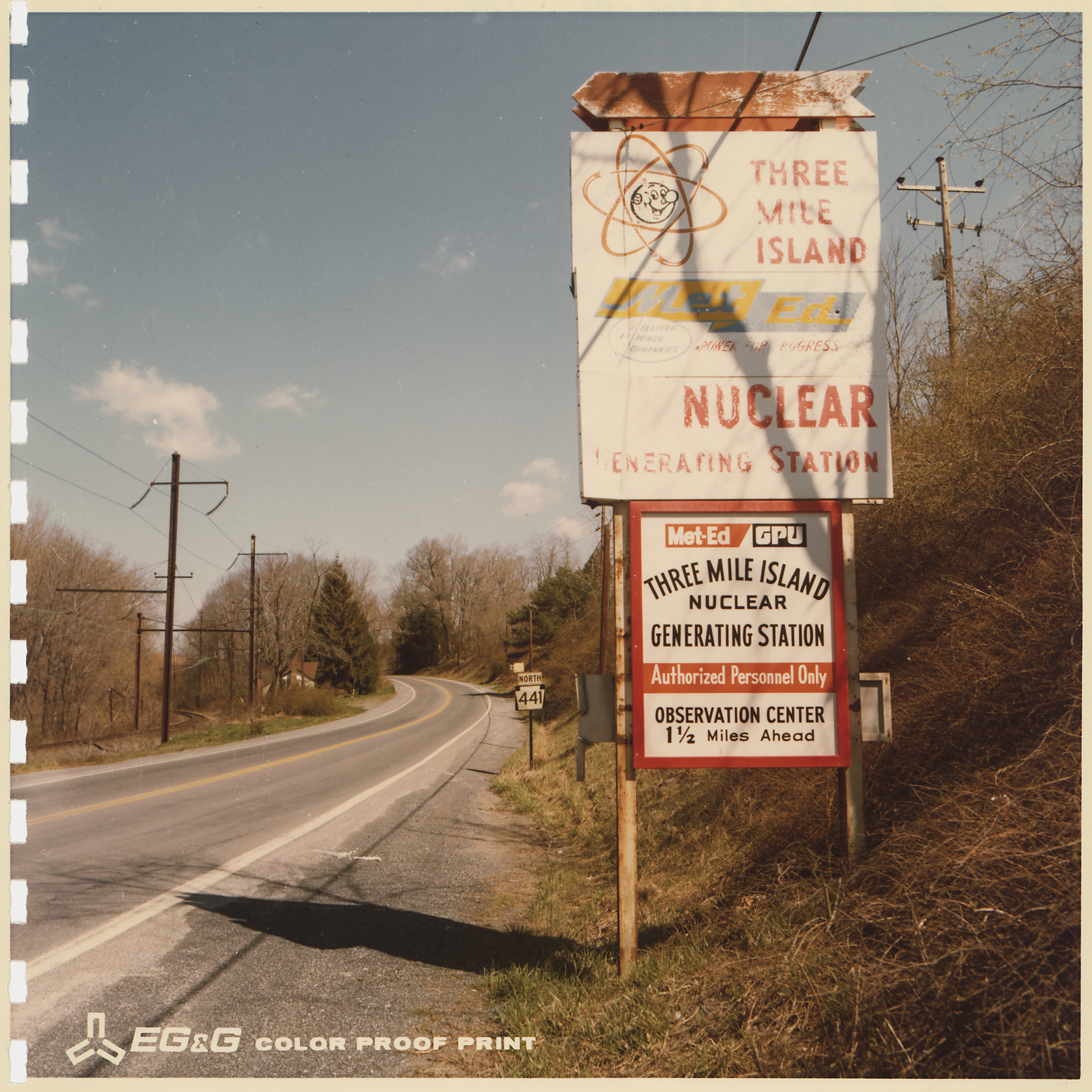
Reddy appeared on a sign along the south entrance to Three Mile Island Nuclear Generating Station, before it was removed after its 1979 accident.

50 years after the creation of Reddy, the corporate climate for electric utilities had changed considerably. The growing influence of the environmental movement in the late 1960s, coupled with the fuel shortages of the early 1970s, had directed the utilities’ focus away from expansion and toward conservation. RKI began to advise its licensees on environmental issues, urging them to use the character to advance a message of "environmental improvement." Reddy Kilowatt clip art began to depict the character in various “green” poses: planting seedlings and installing energy-efficient lighting, for example. In the late 1990s, Reddy's pointed-toed safety boots were replaced with track shoes.

In 1976, in an effort to broaden its range of marketable services, RKI would rebrand itself as Reddy Communications, Inc. (RCI), moving its headquarters to Greenwich, Connecticut.

"Reddy," insisted corporate secretary Louise Bender in 1978, "is the friend of the consumer," adding that urging users to keep their power consumption down was just fulfilling his mission; however, the character's updated image was not an easy fit. Reddy Kilowatt had acted as a cheerleader for energy consumption for more than half a century and his transformation to environmentalist was viewed skeptically by many. Conservation groups and editorial cartoonists began to appropriate the character in ironic and negative ways to satirize the energy industry, to the irritation of the company. In a 1979 case, RCI sued the Environmental Action Foundation (EAF) for its use of Reddy's image to criticize the industry in its publications. The court sided with the EAF and concluded that their parody of the character was fair use.

Reddy's decline was hastened further by skyrocketing energy prices in the late 20th century. The changing corporate environment led to mergers, consolidations and government takeovers of energy companies, running afoul of the company's decree that only investor-owned utilities could license the use of Reddy's image. In one example, the Province of Nova Scotia moved to acquire Nova Scotia Light and Power, a Reddy Kilowatt licensee since 1948. Immediately after the sale concluded in January 1972, company officials fanned out across the system to excise the character's image from signs, vehicles and structures. The corporate logo, which formerly featured a beaming Reddy Kilowatt gripping a placard with the company name, was reduced to an unadorned triangle, sometimes with Reddy's amputated fingers remaining as evidence of his passing.

A final nail in Reddy's coffin was the general fall from grace of fictional and animated characters as corporate spokespersons. Modern corporations have tended to favour abstract logos and wordmarks and celebrity endorsers to represent their brands.

In 1979, 140 American utility companies continued to license the Reddy Kilowatt trademark from RCI. By the late 1990s, only “a handful” of licensees remained worldwide including Oklahoma Gas & Electric, Kenya Power and Lighting Company and the Southeast Queensland Electricity Board. Deborah Dunagan, Chief Operating Officer of RCI, now based in Albuquerque, New Mexico, insisted that Reddy was still a “natural communicator for the information age.”

== Legacy ==
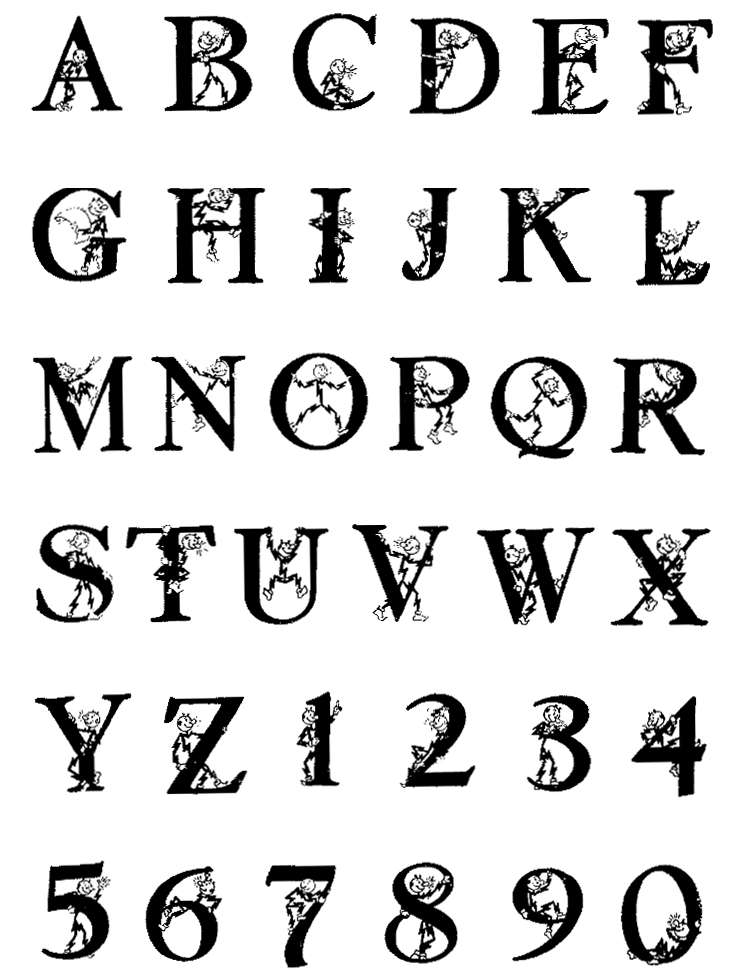
U.S. patent D112515, Alphabet with the Reddy Kilowatt character, created by Ashton Collins in 1938

In late 1998, Northern States Power Company (NSP), based in Minneapolis, agreed to purchase RCI and its trademarks from parent Collins Capital Corporation, now headed by Ashton Collins' son, Ash Collins Jr. NSP's CEO Jim Howard promised that Reddy would continue to be a strong ambassador for the company's electric operations together with a new companion, Reddy Flame, representing its natural gas division. Less than two years later, in August 2000, NSP merged with New Century Energies, Inc. to form Xcel Energy Inc.

As of 2024, few utilities are known to use Reddy Kilowatt under licence from Xcel Energy. One that continues to depict Reddy in its logo is Barbados Light and Power Company Limited (BLP) of Saint Michael, Barbados. For its centennial in 2011, BLP featured Reddy in a short animated film, Electricity and You.

Springdale Jr-Sr High School, in Springdale, PA, uses Reddy Kilowatt as their official school mascot. Springdale, which was home to a power generation facility until recently, has incorporated an "electrical theme" into their culture. This includes Reddy Kilowatt mascot, "Dynamos" for athletic team names, and lightning bolts in their various logos. Reddy Kilowatt, the mascot, celebrated its 100th birthday at Springdale Jr-Sr High School in March, 2026.

Several Reddy Kilowatt artifacts remain in the public eye elsewhere.

In Mount Pearl, Newfoundland and Labrador, Canada, a credit union originally formed to represent employees of a former licensee continues to bear Reddy Kilowatt's name.

Alabama Power Company, where Reddy originated in 1926, restored an historic neon sign including an early version of Reddy on its building in Attalla, Alabama.

In Ecuador, Reddy has been the mascot for Club Sport Emelec since 1929.

In Sioux City, Iowa, the SiouxLandmark preservation society restored a large neon Reddy which had greeted visitors to Sioux City for almost 40 years. The sign is on display in the Iowa State University Design West Studio building, a former power plant.

In York, Pennsylvania, the York County History Center restored an 18-foot Reddy Kilowatt sign which had been located at a nearby hydroelectric plant. The sign is displayed at the History Center's Agricultural and Industrial Museum.

In 2015, the southern Alberta community of Bighorn restored a Reddy Kilowatt image in inlaid linoleum which had been part of a floor at a former Calgary Power staff house for more than 50 years. Restored with the help of flooring manufacturer Armstrong World Industries, the 1.6 square metre image is now on display at the municipality's offices in Exshaw, Alberta.

The trade in Reddy Kilowatt collectibles and memorabilia, from signs to trinkets, remains popular in antique marketplaces and online auction sites. Because of the volume of such material produced by RKI and its licensees, prices for most items are modest, although some rare and unique pieces can command large amounts.

== In popular culture ==
A brief animated clip of Reddy Kilowatt appears in one of the first Star Wars short film parodies, Hardware Wars, produced by Ernie Fosselius and Michael Wiese in 1978. Reddy appears on a shipboard view screen to warn of a "dangerously overloaded octopus connection in sector five." William Gibson compares the logo of Singapore's People's Action Party to Reddy Kilowatt in his 1994 WIRED article on the city-state "Disneyland with the Death Penalty". Reddy Kilowatt was featured in a cameo in the 1994 video game-inspired film Double Dragon, starring Alyssa Milano.

A Reddy Kilowatt lamp was discovered in an abandoned storage locker in 2012 by Barry Weiss on episode 13 of the third season of Storage Wars, titled "Willkommen to the Dollhouse". Considered a valuable collector's item, the lamp and bulb featuring Reddy's likeness was retail valued at $3,000, but ultimately was sold for only $1,600. On the first album by The Grateful Dead, Phil Lesh referred to himself as Phil "Reddy Kilowatt" Lesh. He also used an image of Reddy Kilowatt on Phil Lesh and Friends tour posters and has subsequently used the alias Reddy Kilowatt regularly on Grateful Dead related message boards and on music sharing sites.

In 2018, Victoria, British Columbia, craft brewer Phillips Brewing featured a rendition of Reddy Kilowatt on its "Megahertz Belgium ESB" bottle label. Pulitzer Prize-winning author Connie Schultz mentions Reddy Kilowatt in several of her columns; her father, Chuck Schultz, worked for the Cleveland Electric Illuminating Company for many years. In 2022, a clip of Reddy, and later a parody version of Reddy, appeared on season 9, episode 11 of Last Week Tonight with John Oliver, which discussed investor-owned utilities and performance-based regulation.
