= Freude Bartlett =

American experimental film director

- Born: 1942
- Died: November 9, 2009; Oakland, California, U.S.
- Known for: Experimental film

Freude (Florence) Bartlett (1942 – November 9, 2009) also known as Freude Solomon-Bartlett, was an American experimental film director and founder of the Serious Business Company, a San Francisco-based film sales and film distribution company known for its collection of avant-garde, animation and women's films.

== Early years ==
Born in New York, Bartlett attended San Francisco State University and earned a degree in Information Sciences at University of California, Berkeley.

== Career ==
Bartlett started the company in 1972. She felt strongly about making experimental and women-made films more accessible and would often travel with curated film programs to educate the public about film and earn money for the artists she represented. The Serious Business Company distributed work made by Tom DeWitt, Gunvor Nelson, Chick Strand, Robert Breer, Suzan Pitt, George Griffin, Shirley Clarke, Kathy Rose and Robert Nelson, as well as many other artists. The company closed in 1983. In 1985 she founded Metropolis Media, a communications firm.

== Personal life ==
She married filmmaker Scott Bartlett in 1969. She had a daughter, Stevias Solomon and a son Elon Bartlett. She died in Oakland, California.

== Films ==
Prior to starting the Serious Business Company, Bartlett made lyrical autobiographical films that explored the connection between animals and humans and employed formal devises like superimposition and dissolves. Her films screened at Film Forum, Toronto International Women & Film Festival, Whitney Museum of American Art, and several International Women's Film Festivals.

- Folly (1972) color; 3 min.
- One & The Same (with Gunvor Nelson) (1972–73) color; 4 min.
- My Life In Art (1968–74) color; 36 min.
- Promise Her Anything But Give Her The Kitchen Sink (1968) color; 3 min.
- Shooting Star (1970) color; 5 min.
- Standup And Be Counted (with Scott Bartlett) (1969) color; 3 min.
- Sweet Dreams (1970) color; 3 min.
- Women and Children At Large (1972) color; 7 min.
- Red Heads on Parade (1974)
