= Schmeerguntz =

- Directed by: Gunvor Nelson; Dorothy Wiley
- Distributed by: Canyon Cinema
- Release date: December 31, 1965
- Running time: 15 minutes
- Country: United States
- Language: English

Schmeerguntz is a 1965 American avant-garde film by Gunvor Nelson and Dorothy Wiley. It is a collage film that contrasts messy depictions of domestic life with the pristine images of women found in media and advertising. The film was an inspiration for the Miss America protest that happened in 1968.

== Production ==
=== Photography ===
Nelson and Wiley decided to make a film before they had a subject in mind. Nelson had the idea while looking at the sink in her house and thinking about the contrast between how she actually spent her time and how images in media suggested people spend their time. Neither had worked with a camera before, so Nelson's husband Robert spent half an hour showing them how to operate one.

They shot footage of dirty or grimy objects around the house. As they were filming, they came to observe a contrast between the unpleasantness of their subjects and the appeal of seeing them documented visually. Wiley was pregnant while they were shooting, and Schmeerguntz shows her vomiting from morning sickness, struggling to fit into a garter belt, and wiping feces from her infant's behind.

=== Post-production ===
Nelson and Wiley had their footage developed and began editing Schmeerguntz. Since this was their first time working on a film, they did not provide any instructions to the lab for timing the film or other work. Their editing style consisted of rapid montage that combines their original footage with images from TV, movies, newsreels, and photo animations.

The soundtrack is similarly busy, incorporating music, dialogue, and voice-over narration. Nelson and Wiley cut between the different sources without any sound mixing.

The film's title comes from a nonsensical Germanic-sounding language Nelson's father used. In it, schmeerguntz referred to a sandwich.

== Reception and legacy ==
Schmeerguntz premiered on New Year's Eve 1965 in Sausalito, California. It screened at the 1966 Ann Arbor Film Festival, where it won first prize. The San Francisco International Film Festival also screened it and gave it an award. The 1977 Telluride Film Festival included it in a program called "The Erotic Woman".

The film was largely ignored by contemporary film critics. The only review from the time of its release was by Ernest Callenbach, who wrote in Film Quarterly that "Schmeerguntz is one long raucous belch in the face of the American Home…brash enough, brazen enough, and funny enough to purge the soul of every harried American married woman."

Carol Hanisch and members of New York Radical Women saw the film and had the idea to target a beauty pageant. Their idea was realized as the Miss America protest of 1968.

Renowned film director David Cronenberg has referred to Schmeerguntz as one of his biggest influences, describing it as “the most gross film you could imagine” It was conceived as a hallucinatory collage in which images of the messy, dirty domestic life of a pregnant woman are contrasted with pristine portraits of the families appearing in the media of the times. With a frenetic approach to editing, the film forms a grotesquely funny critique of the idealised American housewife — and was the inspiration behind the feminist “bra burning” protest against the Miss America pageant in 1968.

In 2025, Schmeerguntz was featured in the Sixties Surreal exhibition at the Whitney Museum, in which critic Ben Davis for "Art Net' declared, "Here is an artwork that legitimately can claim to have changed the world."
