= Willie Wiredhand =

- Willie Wiredhand, as designed by McLay
- First appearance: 1951
- Created by: Andrew "Drew" McLay

In-universe information
- Gender: Male
- Occupation: Rural electric cooperative ambassador

Willie Wiredhand is the cartoon mascot of the National Rural Electric Cooperative Association (NRECA), created in 1950 and still in use by co-op electricity companies. His figure consists of a lightbulb socket head, a wire torso, and a two-pronged power plug for his hips and legs. Willie was created as a rival for the corporate Reddy Kilowatt, which led to a lawsuit in 1956 alleging trademark infringement; the case was resolved in the NRECA's favor and Willie was granted his own trademark in 1957. The character has appeared in a wide range of advertising and merchandise, with a lull in popularity after the 1970s followed by a 2000s revival.

== Creation ==
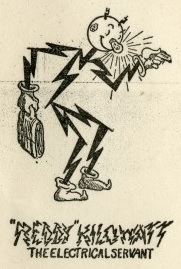
Reddy Kilowatt, the rival electrical mascot licensed by Ashton B. Collins Sr. to investor-owned utilities

Willie Wiredhand was created when the National Rural Electric Cooperative Association (NRECA) was unable to license the Reddy Kilowatt mascot from Ashton B. Collins Sr. Collins created his Reddy Kilowatt mascot in 1934 to promote private investor-owned utilities. These investor-owned utilities did not consider it sufficiently profitable to build electric infrastructure in rural areas. In 1936, the Rural Electrification Act provided federal loans for rural co-ops to build non-profit electric infrastructure through democratically-elected organizations. This program was part of Franklin D. Roosevelt's "New Deal", and later developed into the modern Rural Utilities Service in the United States Department of Agriculture. The NRECA was founded in 1942 as a trade organization to represent these rural co-ops and provide additional services which were too expensive individually. In 1948, Collins refused to license the Reddy Kilowatt character to rural electrical co-ops, on the grounds that it would harm the reputation of the investor-owned utilities to be associated with the federally-subsidized rural programs. In response, the NRECA had a contest to design their own mascot.

The mascot contest was announced in Rural Electrification Magazine in December 1948, with a $50 prize ($670.00 in 2025) for the best design. Freelance artist Andrew "Drew" McLay designed "Willie the Wired Hand", with the "birthday" of October 30, 1950. The name is a play on the phrase "hired hand", a common term for agricultural laborers. Willie's body is a wire, with the prongs of a plug as his legs, and a lightbulb socket with a push-button as his head and nose. He wears the thick gloves of a lineworker. This character, with the slightly revised name "Willie Wiredhand", was chosen as the contest winner in 1951. He advertised electricity as "the never-tiring, always available hired hand to help the nation's farmers."

== Lawsuit ==
Collins challenged NRECA's right to its own mascot as soon as the mascot design contest was announced, writing that he was "the originator and owner of figures symbolizing the use of electric energy". The first lawsuit was filed in 1953 in South Carolina's federal district court. This case was decided in the co-ops' favor in 1956, and Collins appealed to the U.S. Court of Appeals Fourth Circuit. The three judges unanimously ruled that the lower court's decision held, dismissing the complaint on January 7, 1957. The court held that there was no trademark confusion. The opinion, written by Judge Harry E. Watkins, stated that "[t]he names Reddy Kilowatt and Willie Wiredhand are entirely different. The two figures themselves do not look alike." The NRECA successfully countersued for their legal fees. Willie Wiredhand was granted his own trademark by the U.S. Patent Office in 1957.

== Appearances and uses ==
As an advertising mascot, Willie appeared consistently in advertisements and newsletters from NRECA's electrical companies. Beginning in 1956, Willie was the face of a cooperative group of electronics retailers, who could advertise as official "Willie Wiredhand Dealers". A political campaign, "Minutemen for Rural Electrification", included an image of Willie dressed as a Minuteman, which appeared on stage behind then-Senator John F. Kennedy at a 1959 NRECA event in Washington, D.C. In the 1960s, a family group of musicians known as "The Willie Wiredhand Serenaders" hosted a local television show in Oklahoma, Kansas, and Missouri. The show was sponsored by several electric co-ops, and the group also gave touring performances. Two comic books were published in 1967 and 1968, "Cousin Johnny Discovers Power in Rural America" and its sequel "It's Annual Meeting Time for the Davis Family," which starred Willie explaining rural co-op electrification and were distributed by the member co-ops. A five-foot (1.5 m) animatronic mascot at the office of the Electric Power Associations of Mississippi could move its arms and speak. Branded items, including Willie Wiredhand wristwatches and aprons, were given as prizes for sponsored local events.

There was a lull in Willie Wiredhand merchandise and branding after the late 1970s. By 1997, Willie was rarely seen. The Rural Electric Cooperative of Oklahoma, for example, switched to a less cartoonish logo some time before 2001. In the early 2000s, Willie Wiredhand iconography began to regain popularity. An animated neon sign of Willie in Sagle, Idaho, created in the 1950s and out of repair for decades, was restored in 2000 through a crowdfunding campaign. (Note: The sign could no longer be displayed outdoors and was installed above the reception desk.) The NRECA produces an annual Christmas ornament of Willie, and other items have included bobbleheads and handmade wooden pens.
