= The Final Solution (American band) =

American garage rock band

Background information
- Also known as: Earth Mother and the Final Solution
- Origin: San Francisco, California, United States
- Genres: Garage rock; psychedelic rock; folk rock
- Years active: 1965-1967
- Labels: Cream Puff War
- Past members: Ernie Fosselius; Bob Knickerbocker; John Yager; John Chance; Jerry Slick; Jane Dornacker

The Final Solution (also known as Earth Mother and the Final Solution) was an American garage rock band formed in San Francisco, California, in 1965. An early group in the development of what later became known as the San Francisco Sound, the Final Solution contradicted its contemporaries with their controversial name and grim lyrics composed by lead guitarist Ernie Fosselius and bassist Bob Knickerbocker. Although the group never released any recordings in their career, the band was pivotal in the San Francisco's live music scene. A recording of the Final Solution performing at the Matrix in 1966 exists and is available, particularly "So Long Goodbye", which appears on Pebbles, Volume 22.

== History ==
Established in 1965, the Final Solution's line-up featured Ernie Fosselius (lead guitar), John Yager (lead vocals, rhythm guitar), John Chance (drums), and Bob Knickerbocker (bass guitar), most of whom spent time at San Francisco State. Regarding the group's potentially offensive moniker, the Final Solution refers to the phrase "There is no final solution", a cryptic but otherwise meaningless statement. Music historian Alec Palao explained "With their solidly middle-class backgrounds, none of the group had any idea of the slogan's implications". Stylistically, the band bore the closest similarity to the Great Society with raga rock influences and minor-keyed melodies. However, in other aspects, the group made a concerted effort to remain apart from their San Franciscan contemporaries, performing downbeat material penned by Fosselius and Knickerbocker, and dressing in a way that did not exhibit the hippie vibe of the city.

The Final Solution, early on billed as Earth Mother and the Final Solution, opened for several bands in San Francisco in venues such as the Matrix and the Fillmore Auditorium throughout 1965 and 1966, completing approximately 50 live performances during their existence. In addition, the group was house band at the Red Dog Saloon for a month in 1966. After the Great Society disbanded in late 1966, drummer Jerry Slick joined the Final Solution, bringing with him some of his former group's material including "Grimly Forming" and "Father". In fact, the two compositions are partially featured on rehearsal tapes by the group, which survive and have since been bootlegged. The Final Solution did demo for Mainstream Records, a Chicago-based record label which released material by other Bay Area groups; however, they could not secure a contract. Discouraged, the group disbanded sometime in 1967, with Fosselius, Knickerbocker, and Slick all going on to work in filmmaking.

Despite never recording during their existence, the Final Solution has gained attention as psychedelic rock from San Francisco also received re-interest. In 1987, a live rendition of "So Long, Goodbye" appeared on Pebbles, Volume 22. Another song, "Bleeding Rose", is featured on a flexi-disc along with the first issue of the San Francisco fanzine Cream Puff War, in 1991. Tapes of the Final Solution live at the Matrix in 1966 circulated as a bootleg for many years before being officially released in 2025 on High Moon Records. Incidentally, the performance was almost not recorded as the group was a last-minute replacement for another band which cancelled the gig. Music historian Richie Unterberger wrote of the recordings: "Although not close to the upper echelon occupied by the best of their San Francisco peers, much of it's worthwhile, particularly their most folk-rock-aligned stuff, such as 'Just Like Gold' and 'Bleeding Rose'".
