= OffOn =

- Directed by: Scott Bartlett
- Release date: May 10, 1968
- Running time: 9 minutes
- Country: United States

OffOn is an experimental film created by Scott Bartlett made and released in 1968.

== Summary ==
It is most notable for being one of the first examples in which film and video technologies were combined. The nine-minute film combines a number of video loops which have been altered through re-photography or video colorization, and utilizes an electronic sound track to create its unique effect.

== Legacy ==
In 2004, the film was selected for preservation in the United States National Film Registry by the Library of Congress as being "culturally, historically, or aesthetically significant".

It also appeared on the 1979 ABC News special Mission: Mind Control and the 1990 Oscar-nominated documentary film Berkeley in the Sixties.

In 1980, Scott recreated the event in a video production class at UCLA called The Making of OffOn.

== See also ==
- Counterculture of the 1960s
- Television production
- Psychedelia
