= The Great Blondino =

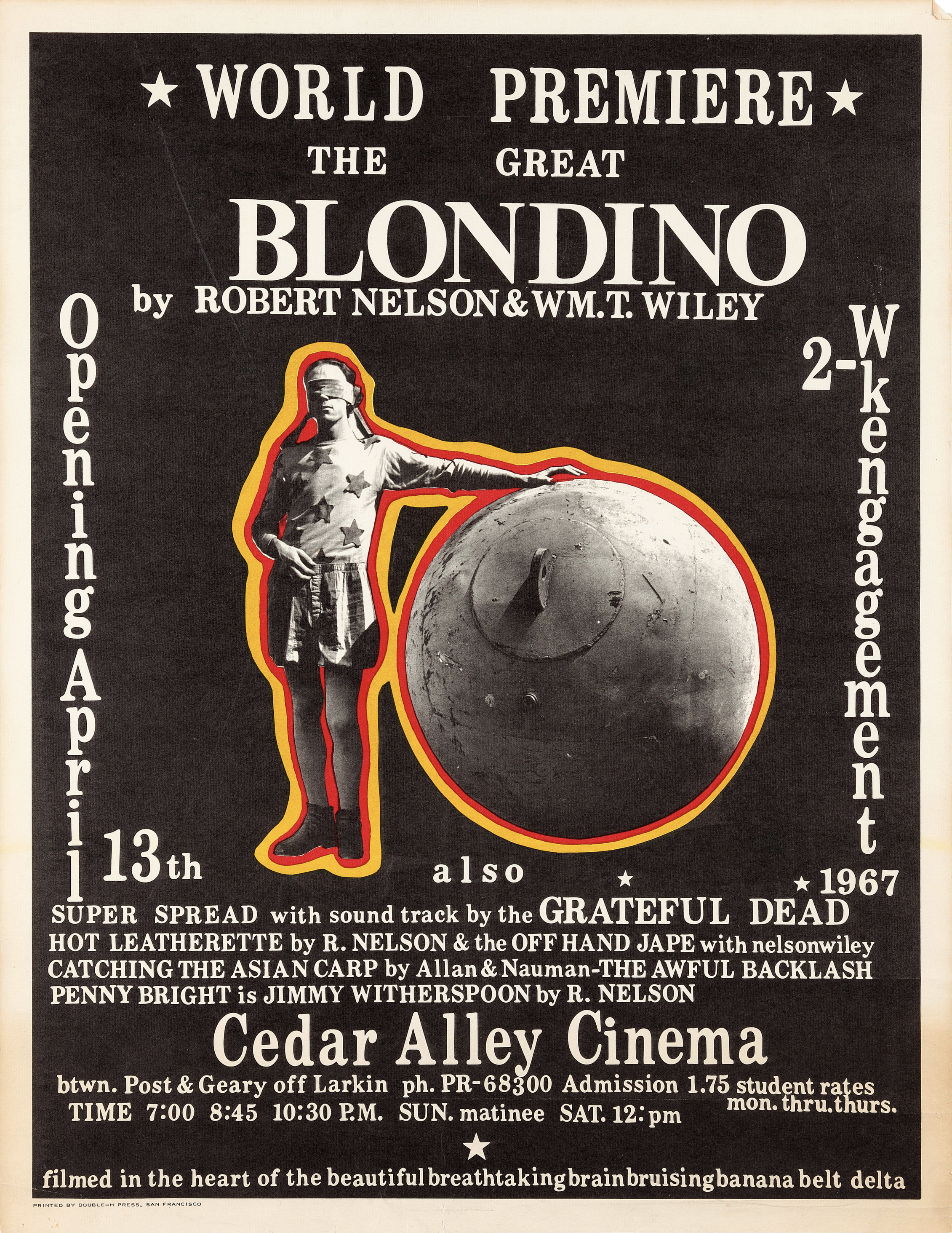
- Directed by: Robert Nelson; William T. Wiley
- Starring: Chuck Wiley
- Distributed by: Canyon Cinema
- Release date: April 13, 1967
- Running time: 42 minutes
- Country: United States
- Language: English
- Budget: $20,000

The Great Blondino is a 1967 American experimental film directed by Robert Nelson and William T. Wiley.

== Plot ==
Blondino is a naïve young man who wanders the streets dressed in medieval attire and pushing a wheelbarrow. He has series of adventures, all the while being pursued by a cop. These stories are mixed with sequences showing Blondino's dreams. Blondino eventually dies after falling from a tightrope but is revived in the film's conclusion.

== Production ==
The Great Blondino stars William's brother Chuck Wiley as Blondino, with Beat poet Lew Welch as the cop. The film was shot in San Francisco over the course of 6–8 sessions in 1966. Filming began with a Bell & Howell camera, but after it broke down, Nelson bought an Arriflex camera for $3,500 as a replacement. The protagonist and his climactic tightrope scene were inspired by tightrope walker Charles Blondin, who performed stunts while crossing the Niagara Gorge. The film's soundtrack was performed by Wiley's band Moving Van Walters and His Truck. Nelson recorded them one day in Richmond, California. The total production budget was roughly $20,000, a large cost for an underground film at the time.

== Release ==
The film premiered April 13, 1967 at the Cedar Alley Cinema in San Francisco. Later that year, it screened at the Brussels Experimental Film Festival. When The Great Blondino was sent to Australia, it was censored by the customs department. A scene of Blondino stroking a rhinoceros horn required review by the chief censor, who took issue with a separate scene in which a girl uses profane language.

The film is now part of Anthology Film Archives' Essential Cinema Repertory collection.

== Reception ==
According to Lenny Lipton, The Great Blondino "went over…like a lead balloon." Nevertheless, Lipton championed the film following its release and said that it was "decidedly worth seeing", commenting that its "variations on the theme of the interesting and different in a super technological society are interesting, and often beautiful." Film theorist Gene Youngblood called The Great Blondino his favorite piece by Nelson. P. Adams Sitney identified Nelson's The Grateful Dead and The Great Blondino as highlights of the 1967 Knokke-Le-Zoute Experimental Film Festival. In Roger Greenspun's review for The New York Times, he remarked, "Blondino is a kind of cosmic clown, and…I feel guilty about not liking him better than I do." Critic J. Hoberman wrote for The Village Voice that Nelson "tosses off more good visual ideas in 45 minutes than many filmmakers do in a lifetime".
