= Ashton B. Collins Sr. =

American inventor (1885–1976)

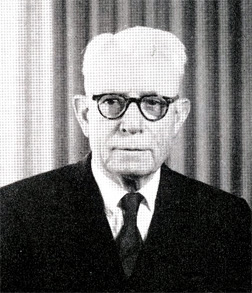
- Born: Ashton Budd Collins; September 14, 1885
- Died: December 16, 1976 (aged 91); Birmingham, Alabama, U.S.
- Occupations: Inventor, businessman
- Spouse: Hughie Beatty “Mez” Collins (m. 1931–1976)
- Children: Ashton B. Collins Jr. Croom Beatty Collins

Ashton Budd Collins Sr. (September 14, 1885 – December 16, 1976) was an American inventor and marketer. He was the creator of Reddy Kilowatt, a popular corporate trade symbol for the electric utility industry for much of the 20th century.

== Creation of Reddy Kilowatt ==
Collins was working as the commercial manager for the Alabama Power Company in 1926 when he was asked to create a display for the company at the Alabama Electrical Exposition. Like many utilities in the 1920s, the company was seeking to expand its reach into rural areas not yet connected to the electrical grid. Collins sought to humanize the service as a marketing and public relations tool. In later years, Collins described how he watched jagged bolts of lightning strike the ground during an electrical storm. The image inspired him to create a lanky stick figure with lightning bolts for arms and legs, a round head with a light bulb for a nose and wall sockets for ears, and a pair of sparks atop his head for hair (or possibly horns). Collins gave the character a pair of safety gloves and a jaunty smile and called his creation “Reddy Kilowatt”. Collins asked Dan Clinton, an Alabama Power engineer, to develop the first sketches of the character for the exhibition and related newspaper advertising. Alabama Power copyrighted Reddy on March 6, 1926, and the character first appeared in an advertisement in The Birmingham News eight days later.

== Marketing ==
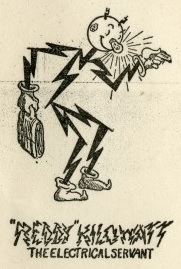
Reddy Kilowatt, US patent picture, 1933

In 1933, Collins left Alabama Power to join the fledgling Edison Electric Institute, an association set up to represent investor-owned utilities. Alabama Power allowed him to retain the rights to Reddy Kilowatt and he applied for a U.S. patent for the character in 1933.

A friend, Dorothea Warren, prepared several new renderings of Reddy to help him market the trademark under the banner of the “Reddy Kilowatt Service” to member utilities. While with the EEI Collins travelled the United States promoting the use of electrical energy. He used the opportunity to sell other companies on the value of humanizing their product. By the end of 1934 he had signed up at least six, including PPL Corporation. In 1957, Collins incorporated his business for the first time as Reddy Kilowatt, Inc.

Soon after introducing Reddy Kilowatt to the American marketplace, Collins began promoting the character in other countries, securing trademarks in Canada, the United Kingdom, Australia, Mexico, South America, the Caribbean and elsewhere. In 1957 the number of companies employing Reddy around the globe totaled 222. It is estimated that by the early 1970s, when the industry's focus shifted from expansion to conservation, Reddy had served as ambassador for more than 300 organizations.

In 1946, Collins was credited as producer on an animated film starring Reddy Kilowatt, created by the Walter Lantz Productions, called Reddy Made Magic.

== Advocate ==
Collins was a strong believer in capitalism and insisted that Reddy would be licensed only to publicly traded, tax-paying utility companies. Following World War II, Collins became increasingly concerned about the spread of government and cooperative-run electric companies. The Reddy Kilowatt Service began producing ads that equated such organizations with the spread of socialism. In 1950, he created the Grass Roots Impact Plan to advance the promotion of this theme. Collins was convinced of the importance of delivering his pro-capitalist message to young audiences, encouraging Reddy Kilowatt licensees to launch youth clubs in the late 1940s. In the middle of the dissent-filled 1960s, he developed a comprehensive education program to teach young people capitalist economic values. A supporting slide presentation, aimed at executives, called “Fission, Fertility, and the Future” emphasized the importance of reaching youth during times of social upheaval in order to protect the interests of investor-owned utilities. In 1956, Collins took aim at the National Rural Electric Cooperative Association, an association of cooperative-owned utilities. Members of that organization, unable to license the Reddy Kilowatt service mark, created their own in 1952. The Willie Wiredhand character featured a body of electric cable with electric plug feet. Reddy Kilowatt, Inc. filed suit against the cooperatives but on January 7, 1957, the court ruled the characters were different and dismissed the complaint.

== Personal life ==
In 1931, Collins married Hughie Beatty (1903–2001). The couple raised two children, Ashton Jr. (1932), and Croom Beatty (1936). After his release from the Air Force, Ash Collins Jr. joined Reddy Kilowatt, Inc., starting in the mailroom in 1956. In 1962, he became the president of the company while Ashton Sr. became the chairman of the Board of Directors. Beatty Collins also served on the company's board of directors. Reddy Kilowatt, Inc. was renamed Reddy Communications, Inc. in 1976. In 1998, the company and its trademarks were purchased by Northern States Power, now a subsidiary of Xcel Energy.

== See also ==
- Reddy Kilowatt
- Walter Lantz
