= My Name Is Oona =

1969 American short film directed by Gunvor Nelson

- Directed by: Gunvor Nelson
- Starring: Oona Nelson
- Distributed by: Canyon Cinema
- Release date: 1969
- Running time: 10 minutes
- Country: United States
- Language: English

My Name Is Oona is a 1969 American avant-garde short film directed by Gunvor Nelson. It uses footage of her daughter Oona that has been optically printed, with Oona's voice used for the soundtrack. In 2019, the film was selected for preservation in the National Film Registry by the Library of Congress.

== Summary ==
Footage of Gunvor's daughter Oona saying her name multiple times and days of the week edited into an expressive rhythmical structure that accompanies the visual structure of the film that plunges into the experience of a child.

== Production ==
My Name Is Oona began with footage of Oona that Gunvor optically printed. Inspiration for the film's soundtrack came when Nelson attended a Steve Reich concert. Gunvor recorded Oona saying her name in different ways, and after hearing about the project, Reich sent Gunvor a recording he had made of Oona saying the days of the week. Gunvor worked with Patrick Gleeson to create the audio track. Once that was complete, Nelson made a final cut of the film by editing the image track based on the audio.

== Reception and legacy ==
When My Name Is Oona screened at the Whitney Museum, Danny Weiss of Show Business Illustrated identified it as a standout, calling it a lyrical film that "ends leaving the viewer a little high." In The Village Voice, Amos Vogel declared it "one of the most perfect recent examples of poetic cinema."

In 2019, the film was selected by the U.S. Library of Congress for preservation in the National Film Registry for being "culturally, historically, or aesthetically significant".
