= Gunvor Nelson =

Swedish film director (1931–2025)

Gunvor Grundel Nelson
- Born: 28 July 1931; Kristinehamn, Sweden
- Died: 6 January 2025 (aged 93)
- Occupations: Experimental filmmaker; artist
- Known for: Avant-garde experimental films
- Awards: Guggenheim Fellowship

Gunvor Eleonora Grundel Nelson (28 July 1931 – 6 January 2025) was a Swedish artist. She began working as an experimental filmmaker since the 1960s. Some of her most widely known works were created while she lived in the Bay Area in the mid-1960s and early 1970s, where she became well established among other artists in the avant-garde film circles of the 1960s and to the present. As of 2006, she had to her credit 20 films, five videos, and one video installation (Holmlund, 67).

== Early life and education ==
Nelson was born in Kristinehamn, Sweden on 28 July 1931. She obtained a Master of Arts degree from Mills College in Oakland, California. Her teaching experience includes the San Francisco Art Institute from 1970 to 1992; she moved back to Sweden in 1993.

== Career ==
Additional positions she has held include a year at San Francisco State University from 1969 to 1970 and a semester in 1987 at the School of the Art Institute of Chicago. Her work has been featured in numerous European and North American festivals, one-woman shows, and she has been the recipient of several awards and grants. Some of these awards include: a Guggenheim Fellowship, two National Endowment for the Arts grants, as well as a Rockefeller Foundation grant (Holmlund, 84).

Nelson's films were shown quietly in the underground circuit on the West and East coasts of the United States, until the mid-70s when she began to get press from sources that ranged from Playboy editors to Pauline Kael. This increase in national press coverage of her films was in part due to the notable Take-Off, a memorable satire on the performance of the striptease.

== Death ==
Nelson died on 6 January 2025, at the age of 93.

== Legacy ==
In 2019, Gunvor's 1969 short film My Name Is Oona, an intricate study of her nine-year-old daughter, was selected by the U.S. Library of Congress for preservation in the National Film Registry for being "culturally, historically, or aesthetically significant".

== Films ==
In many of her major works she addresses subjects such as: childhood, memory, the idea of home/homeland and displacement, aging and death, and the symbolism of natural forces — particularly in relation to female beauty and power. Her talents for editing what is often dreamlike imagery, combined with fine attention to the effects of language and sound on the moving image, serve to enhance the consistent aesthetic of her experimental films.

Nelson often creates what she termed "personal films" rather than "experimental" or "avant-garde" films; on this matter she said "Everyone seemed unsure of what to call it. It is difficult. Are you really so "avant-garde"? Experimental films sounds like something incomplete. I have made both surrealistic and expressionistic films, but I prefer the term "personal film". That is what it is about. Even if many don't understand the meaning of the term. On the other hand, it can be easier to refer to them as avant-garde films. But I like the description "personal film" since it stems from one person. When you paint, the term you choose will be described by method; mural painters for instance and so on. But when it comes to film we lack [the capacity] to describe what we are really doing."

Her depictions of women's experiences and issues of identity are never overtly political in their agenda or simplistic in nature; often they explore the sensual and erotic, and critique society's portrayal of women yet she denies any specifically "feminist" agenda behind her art-making. Instead, she creates "feminist" works in the broader sense of the term, they seek to find a more universal resonance as they address the personal and: "what is original, instinctive, and natural in womankind". Nelson also prefers not to be referred to as a "woman" artist but simply an "artist".

Nelson's work often reveals her fascination with the visual translation and transformation of the world that a camera is capable of achieving. Commenting on her first film Schmeerguntz, a collaborative effort with Dorothy Wiley, Nelson said "I discovered how beautiful things look through the camera... A melon or dirty dishes, seen with a lens in close-up were translated into something else... The camera became like binoculars; you zero in on a small area and isolate it, and it becomes more precious because it's selected." (Holmlund, 78).

Her fascination with materials reflected in the titling of her work likely stems from her earlier artistic background as a painter. The visual transformations she obtains in the act of filming she typically modifies through painting and animation, then organizes through painstaking editing of images and sound.

== Filmography ==
- Schmeerguntz (with Dorothy Wiley), 1965 (15 min.): sound, black and white; 16mm
- Fog Pumas (with Dorothy Wiley), 1967 (25 min.): sound, color; 16mm
- Kirsa Nicholina, 1969 (16 min.): sound, color; 16mm
- My Name Is Oona, 1969 (10 min.): sound, black and white; 16mm
- Kirsa Nicholina, 1969 (16 min.): sound, color; 16mm
- Five Artists: BillBobBillBillBob (with Dorothy Wiley), 1971 (70 min.): sound, color; 16mm
- One and the Same (with Freude Solomon-Bartlett), 1972 (4 min.): sound, color; 16mm
- Take Off (with Magda), 1972 (10 min.): sound, black and white; 16mm
- Moon's Pool, 1973 (15 min.): sound, color; 16mm
- Trollstene, 1973-76 (120 min.): sound, color; 16mm
- Before Need* (with Dorothy Wiley), 1979 (75 min.): sound, color; 16mm
- Frame Line, 1984 (22 min.): sound, black and white; 16mm
- Red Shift, 1984 (50 min.): sound, black and white; 16mm
- Light Years, 1987 (28 min.): sound, color; 16mm
- Light Years Expanding, 1987 (25 min.): sound, color; 16mm
- Field Study #2, 1988 (25 min.): sound, color; 16mm
- Natural Features, 1990 (30 min.): sound, color; 16mm
- Time Being, 1991 (8 min.): silent, black and white; 16mm
- Old Digs, 1993 (20 min.): sound, color; 16mm
- Kristina's Harbor, 1993 (50 min.): sound, color; 16mm
- Before Need Redressed (with Dorothy Wiley), 1995 (42 min.): sound, color; 16 mm
- Tree-Line/Tradgrans, 1998 (8 min.): sound, color; video
- Bevismaterial:52 Veckor (Collected Evidence: 52 Weeks), 1998 (4x30 min.): installation
- Snowdrift (a.k.a. Snowstorm), 2001 (9 min.): sound, color; video
- Trace Elements, 2003 (9 min.): sound, color; video
- True to Life, 2006 (38 min.): video
- New Evidence, 2006 (22 min.): video

== Sources ==
- Holmlund, Chris. "Excavating Visual Fields, Layering Auditory Frames: Signature, Translation, Resonance, and Gunvor Nelson’s Films." Women's Experimental Cinema. Ed. Robin Blaetz. Duke University Press: Durham & London, 2007. 67–88.
