= Porklips Now =

1980 film by Ernie Fosselius

- Directed by: Ernie Fosselius
- Release date: 1980

Porklips Now is a short, low budget parody film, made in 1980 by the American director Ernie Fosselius, based on the 1979 motion picture Apocalypse Now.

It chronicles the journey of Dullard (played by William "Billy" Gray, most famous as "Bud" in the Father Knows Best TV series), a gardener and handyman, sent to Chinatown by two butchers to meet a business rival, Fred "Madman" Mertz, and "take care of business". The film incorporates references to signature elements of the film on which it is based, albeit in a somewhat conspicuously low-budget manner.

Echoing a widely held if erroneous belief about Apocalypse Now, the film features several alternate endings.

The film was included on the compilation VHS release Hardware Wars, and Other Film Farces from Warner Home Video and is currently available on VHS and DVD from Pyramid Direct Films.

== Complete credited cast ==
- Billy Gray – Dullard (credited as William Gray)
- Ernie Fosselius – Mertz/Kilroy
- John Brent – Head Butcher
- Leon Martell – Butcher's Aide
- Mark Lee – "Slick"
- Jim Turner – Rick
- Larry Walker – "Famous Italian Director"
- Tom Bullock – photographer

== DVD release ==
In 2009, Apprehensive Films released Porklips Now onto DVD.
