= Scott Bartlett =

American film director

- Born: 1943
- Died: September 29, 1990; San Francisco, United States
- Known for: Experimental film
- Notable work: OffOn

Scott Bartlett (1943 – September 29, 1990 in San Francisco, CA) was one of the premiere abstract/experimental cinematic artists of the late 1960s and the 1970s. His acclaimed works, such as Off/On and Moon 1969, were greatly admired by many movie directors, including Stanley Kubrick, Francis Ford Coppola and George Lucas. His notable abstract movies and visual avant-garde motion pictures includes Serpent, Medina, Metanomen, Lovemaking, and the poignant interior documentary 1970. His 1967-1972 experiment OffOn, shot on 16mm, was groundbreaking for its use of new video imagery technologies. A still from "OffOn" is the cover of the 1970 E.P. Dutton edition of "Expanded Cinema" by Gene Youngblood.

== Late career ==
His science fiction epic feature Interface was in pre-production for many years, having completed a pre-visualization version starring a then unknown William Hurt. The project was canceled during one of the many difficult periods for Francis Coppola's Zoetrope Studios. He continued to work in various artistic endeavors and was regularly consulted by special effects crews for large Hollywood movies including Altered States, and George Lucas hired him to create the "montage design" for the sequel More American Graffiti.

== Personal life ==
He graduated from the Illinois Institute of Technology. Scott Bartlett was married to filmmaker Freude Bartlett with whom he had a son, Adam. They were divorced. He died of complications from a kidney and liver transplant.

== Selected filmography ==
- Metanomen (1966)
- OffOn (1968) - National Film Registry inductee
- A Trip to the Moon (1968), black and white, 33 minutes
- Moon 1969 (1969), color 15 minutes
- Standup And Be Counted (with Freude Bartlett) (1969) color, 3 minutes
- Medina (1972)
- Heavy Metal (1979)
- The Making of OffOn (1980)
- Find Your Place (1990)
