= Robert Nelson (filmmaker) =

American film director

- Born: March 1, 1930; San Francisco
- Died: January 9, 2012 (aged 81)
- Occupation(s): Director, producer, cinematographer, writer
- Spouse: Gunvor Nelson

Robert Nelson (March 1, 1930; San Francisco – January 9, 2012; Laytonville, California) was an American experimental film director.

== Archive ==
The moving image collection of Robert Nelson is housed at the Academy Film Archive. The Academy Film Archive has preserved a number of Robert Nelson's films, including Grateful Dead, The Great Blondino, and Hot Leatherette.

== Selected filmography ==
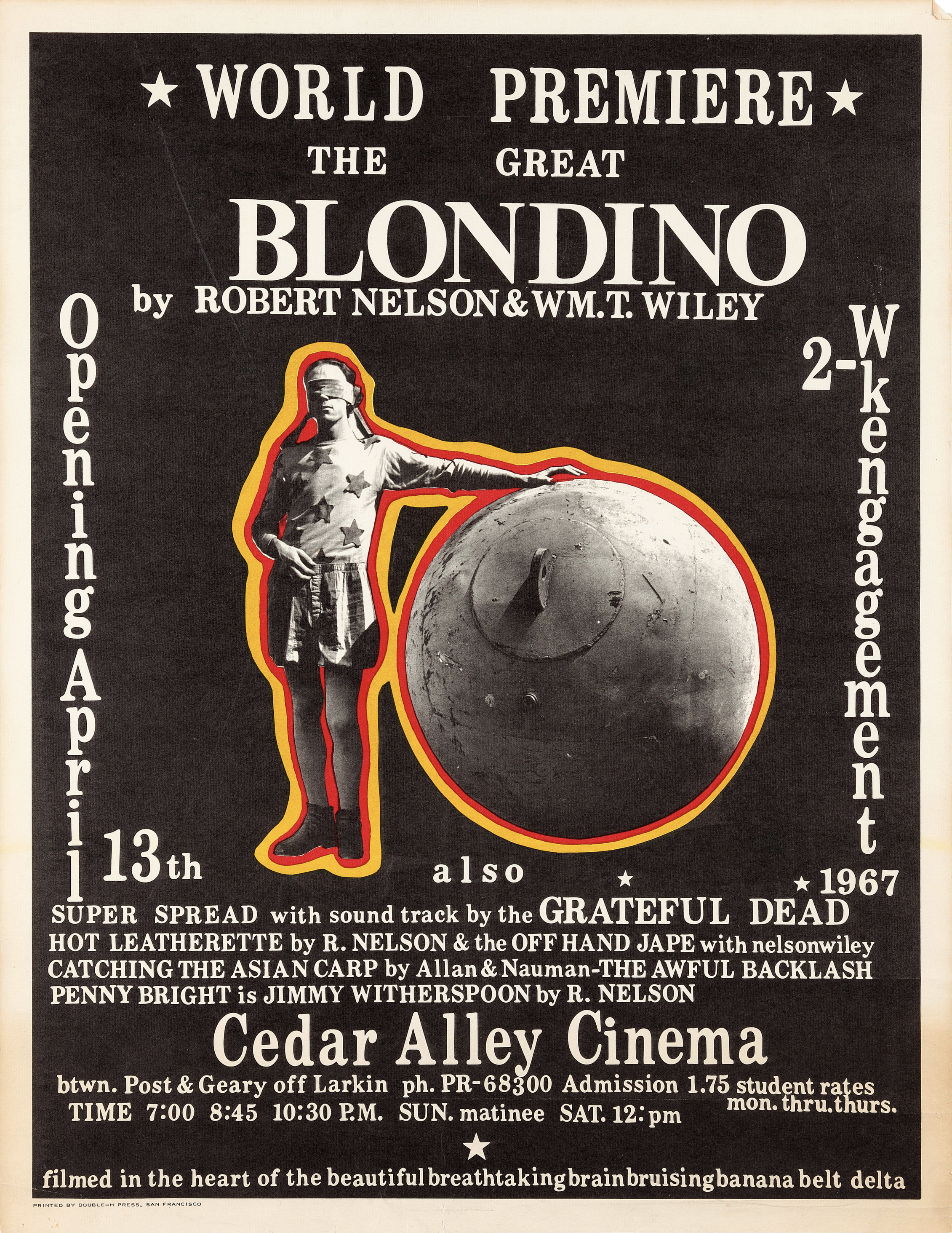
The Great Blondino (1967)

- Building Muir Beach House (1961, with Gunvor Nelson)
- Last Week at Oona's Bath (1962, with Gunvor Nelson)
- The Mystery of Amelia Air-Heart Solved (1962)
- King Ubu (1963)
- Plastic Haircut (1963, with William T. Wiley, R.G. Davis, Robert H. Hudson, Steve Reich)
- Oh Dem Watermelons (1965)
- Confessions of a Black Mother-Succuba (1965)
- Oily Peloso the Pumph Man (1965)
- Thick Pucker (1965)
- Sixty Lazy Dogs (1965)
- Half-Open and Lumpy (1967)
- Penny Bright and Jimmy Witherspoon (1967)
- Superspread (1967)
- The Beard (1967)
- Portrait of Gourley (1967)
- The Off Handed Jape (1967, with William T. Wiley)
- Hot Leatherette (1967)
- The Great Blondino (1967, with William T. Wiley)
- Grateful Dead (1967)
- The Awful Backlash (1967, with William Allan)
- War is Hell (1968, with William Allan)
- What Do You Talk About? (1969, with William T. Wiley)
- Bleu Shut (1970)
- King David (1970/73/2003, with Mike Henderson)
- R.I.P. (1970/74/2003)
- No-More (1971, with various students at Cornell University)
- Worldly Woman (1973, with Mike Henderson)
- Deep Westurn (1974)
- Suite California Stops & Passes Part 1: Tijuana to Hollywood Via Death Valley (1976)
- Suite California Stops & Passes Part 2: San Francisco to the Sierra Nevadas & Back Again (1978)
- Hamlet Act (1982)
- Limitations (1988)
- Curious Native Customs (1989)
- 199 L.la (1989)
- Hauling Toto Big (1997)
- Special Warning (1998)

== See also ==
- Canyon Cinema
