= Easy Riders, Raging Bulls =

1998 book by Peter Biskind

- Author: Peter Biskind
- Publisher: Simon & Schuster
- Publication date: 1998
- ISBN: 978-0684857084

Easy Riders, Raging Bulls: How the Sex-Drugs-and-Rock 'N Roll Generation Saved Hollywood is a book by Peter Biskind, published by Simon & Schuster in 1998, about ostensibly 1960s and 1970s Hollywood, a period of American film known for the production of such films such as The Godfather, The Godfather Part II, The French Connection, Chinatown, Taxi Driver, Jaws, Star Wars, The Exorcist, and The Last Picture Show. The book presents a comprehensive look into the people who influenced these pictures and who continue to influence modern day filmmaking. The title is taken from films which bookend the era: Easy Rider (1969) and Raging Bull (1980).

The book was the basis of a 2003 documentary film of the same title, directed by Kenneth Bowser and narrated by actor William H. Macy. The documentary was screened out of competition at the 2003 Cannes Film Festival. Rotten Tomatoes gives the film a score of 100%, aggregated from the input of eight contributors.

== Profiles and interviews ==
=== Profiled in the book ===
- Robert Altman
- Hal Ashby
- Luke Askew
- Gerald Ayres
- Warren Beatty
- Peter Bogdanovich
- Francis Ford Coppola
- Brian De Palma
- Robert Evans
- Peter Fonda
- William Friedkin
- Buck Henry
- Dennis Hopper
- Amy Irving
- George Lucas
- Marcia Lucas
- John Milius
- Jack Nicholson
- Polly Platt
- Bob Rafelson
- Bert Schneider
- Leonard Schrader
- Paul Schrader
- Martin Scorsese
- Cybill Shepherd
- Don Simpson
- Steven Spielberg
- Robert Towne

=== Interviewed in the film ===
- Dede Allen
- Peter Bart
- Tony Bill
- Karen Black
- Peter Bogdanovich
- Ellen Burstyn
- Roger Corman
- Micky Dolenz
- Richard Dreyfuss
- Peter Fonda
- Carl Gottlieb
- Jerome Hellman
- Monte Hellman
- Dennis Hopper
- Willard Huyck
- Stanley Jaffe
- Henry Jaglom
- Gloria Katz
- Margot Kidder
- Laszlo Kovacs
- Kris Kristofferson
- Mardik Martin
- Mike Medavoy
- Sylvia Miles
- John Milius
- Charles Mulvehill
- David Newman
- Arthur Penn
- Michael Phillips
- David Picker
- Polly Platt
- Albert S. Ruddy
- Jennifer Salt
- Andrew Sarris
- Paul Schrader
- Cybill Shepherd
- Jonathan Taplin
- Joan Tewkesbury
- Fred Weintraub
- Gordon Willis
- Rudy Wurlitzer
- Vilmos Zsigmond

== Response ==
Several of the film-makers profiled in the book have criticized Biskind, many rather harshly. Robert Altman denounced both the book and Biskind's methods, saying "It was hate mail. We were all lured into talking to this guy because people thought he was a straight guy but he was filling a commission from the publisher for a hatchet job. He's the worst kind of human being I know."

Francis Ford Coppola was highly critical, alleging that Biskind interviewed only people with negative opinions of him.

The Sundance festival came under heavy criticism in Biskind's book. He describes it as "little more than a means to save a land deal that was going wrong, by dragging some punters up to his [Robert Redford's] failing ski resort." The author bemoans Redford as "untouchable in America" where he's considered "as pure as the driven snow," having "the best press of any Hollywood figure ever." Biskind claims Sundance "has failed" if judged by its "original, loftier goal" to be "an institute to help outsiders." Redford responded by saying that he'd never seen Biskind at Sundance and that the festival's success speaks for itself.

Critic Roger Ebert reported Steven Spielberg saying of Easy Riders, Raging Bulls: "Every single word in that book about me is either erroneous or a lie." Ebert himself remarked that "Biskind has a way of massaging his stories to suit his agenda."

When asked about Biskind's portrayal of him as "a womanizer, a tyrant and a bully," director William Friedkin said: "I've actually never read the book, but I've talked to some of my friends who are portrayed in it, and we all share the opinion that it is partial truth, partial myth and partial out-and-out lies by mostly rejected girlfriends and wives." Peter Bogdanovich was "furious," saying: "I spent seven hours with that guy over a period of days, and he got it all wrong".

In a 2014 interview, Biskind stated he found the negative responses "very upsetting," saying, "Coppola...made three great movies, the two Godfathers and The Conversation. His place in film history is secure. If I had made those films, I wouldn’t give a damn what anyone wrote about me." He offered as a counterpoint William Friedkins' alleged reaction: "It's only a book." Biskind claimed he and Coppola made amends on a cruise in 2000, though eye witnesses in the cruise stated that Coppola "grilled" and "needled" Biskind with "hostile questions," rendering the author "visibly uncomfortable," and that the director concluded with the words "I forgive [you]" in the manner that, in Godfather II, Michael Corleone forgives his brother Fredo right before he has him murdered.

== See also ==
- A Decade Under the Influence, documentary about the New Hollywood (2003)
