= Ernie Fosselius =

American film director (born 1945)

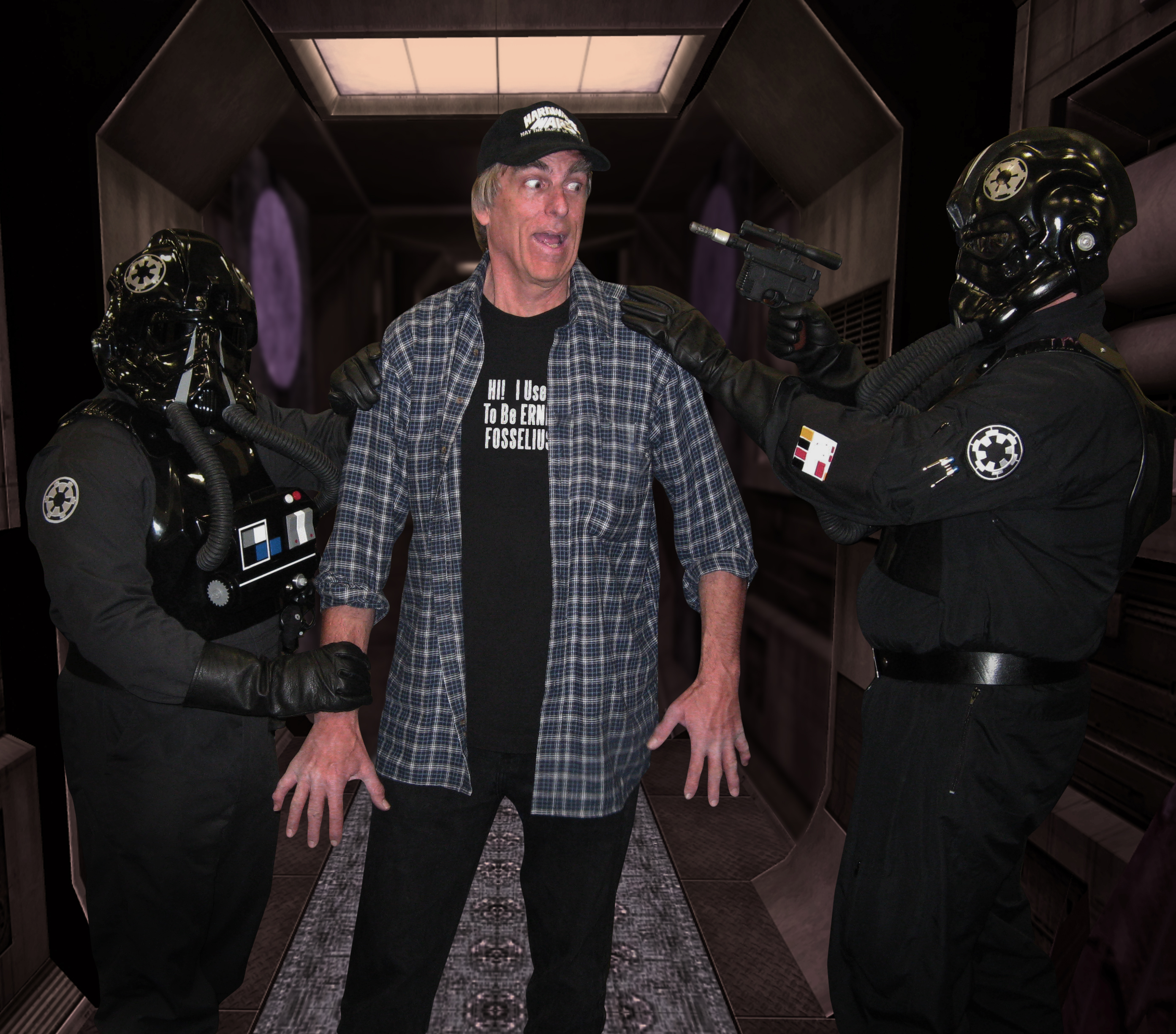
- Fosselius in 2010
- Born: October 23, 1945 (age 81); San Francisco, California, United States
- Occupations: Film director, screenwriter, film producer, animator, Foley editor
- Years active: 1970s–present

Carl Ernst Fosselius (born October 23, 1945), better known as Ernie Fosselius, is an American filmmaker. He is best known for his satirical spoofs of popular films, including the Star Wars parody Hardware Wars.

== Film career ==
Fosselius' film career began in the early 1970s when he co-created 20 original animated films for Sesame Street.

Fosselius is known for his satirical short films. The first one appeared in 1976 in Mother's Little Network, a Pythonesque sketch comedy show for WGBH-TV in Boston; it was The Hindenburger, in which a flying Big Mac burst into flames over New Jersey while a radio announcer (voiced by Fosselius) emotionally sobbed: "Oh, the humanity, oh, the cheese!"

Porklips Now was a send-up of Francis Ford Coppola's Apocalypse Now which starred Billy Gray of TV's Father Knows Best.

Fosselius was hired by Universal Studios to develop comedy screenplays. After working for many months on a script entitled Two Guys from Space, the studio pulled the plug on the project and offered him the directing job on Pee-wee's Big Adventure as a consolation. Fosselius passed on it and went back to Fantasy Studios in Berkeley, where he made his living as a sound effects and Foley editor on many feature films, including Ed Wood, Serial Mom, Dragon: The Bruce Lee Story, The Unbearable Lightness of Being, and Amadeus.

Fosselius continued to write screenplays (11 scripts that never went into production, including the Zippy the Pinhead movie) and work in the movie business as a director of "industrial" shorts, a special effects fabricator (including for RoboCop 2), an actor, sound editor, and voice actor.

Ben Burtt asked Fosselius to contribute unusual voices and vocal effects to several Lucasfilm productions, such as the two pilots in Indiana Jones and the Temple of Doom. He provided the voice of Poggle the Lesser in Star Wars: Episode II – Attack of the Clones and voiced the sobs of the Rancor Keepers, Malakili and Giran, in Return of the Jedi. He also contributed to the music score of Return of the Jedi and is credited with co-writing the song "Lapti Nek". Additionally, he voiced the "Ack Ack"s in Mars Attacks! and was also the voice of Trantor the Troll in Ernest Scared Stupid.

Fosselius directed the Eegah episode of Cinema Insomnia with Mr. Lobo and, staying true to his directing technique, also created many of the props. In 2009, Fosselius created a tribute to Ed Wood with his short film, Plan 9.1 from Outer Space, which featured hand-carved wooden puppets of the characters from Ed Wood's film, Plan 9 from Outer Space. The puppets acted out the scenes along with the edited soundtrack of the original film.

=== Hardware Wars ===
Fosselius' biggest hit was his 1978 parody Hardware Wars, a 13-minute parody of Hollywood coming attractions that took on the cultural juggernaut that was Star Wars.

Complete with cardboard sets and visible wires holding up ships which were various household appliances, the film was shot over 4 days with a budget of around $8,000. When released, the film became a hit on its own, grossing close to three million dollars over its lifetime, making it one of the most popular and profitable short films of all time, but Fosselius netted very little of that profit.

In later years, George Lucas called it his favorite Star Wars parody. Fosselius was honored by Lucasfilm when Hardware Wars was given the Pioneer Award at the 2003 Official Star Wars Fan Film Awards.

When Hardware Wars was re-released in 1997 with new special effects in a "Special Edition" to spoof the special editions of the original Star Wars trilogy, Fosselius was not involved, as he disagreed with the concept of adding actual digital effects to a film which satirized digital effects, and asked that a "Not Approved by Ernie" label be added to the release. The film was finally released on DVD in its original form in 2002. This time, Fosselius did participate, restoring the original stereo soundtrack, adding additional material and original outtakes, and recording a director's commentary that itself was a parody, poking fun at similarly self-indulgent tracks. However, Fosselius was reportedly flummoxed by the technicians who performed the telecine transfer and who made attempts to digitally remove the strings and wires and clean up the print, not realizing that the "defects" in the original were put there on purpose. Fosselius later teamed up with Apprehensive Films to release a 30th-anniversary DVD.

== Musical career ==
In the mid-1960s, Fosselius performed with the San Francisco band Earth Mother and the Final Solution. He was also a founding member of the band The Mystic Knights of the Oingo Boingo, for whom he wrote the song "Hipsters on Parade".

== Other works ==
Fosselius has continued to whittle mechanically animated carved caricatures and automata which he displays in traveling galleries called the "Marvelous Mechalodeon" and the "Crankabout Mechanical Theater", an entirely human-powered exhibit.

Fosselius was contracted by Earl Vickers of Atari to do the voices for the 1985 arcade game Gauntlet.
