= Hardware Wars =

1978 film by Ernie Fosselius

- Screenshot from the film. Counterclockwise from top left: Fluke Starbucker, Chewchilla the Wookiee Monster, Ham Salad, and Augie "Ben" Doggie
- Directed by: Ernie Fosselius
- Written by: Ernie Fosselius
- Produced by: Ernie Fosselius; Michael Wiese
- Starring: Scott Mathews; Cindy Furgatch (Freeling); Jeff Hale; Bob Knickerbocker; Frank Robertson
- Narrated by: Paul Frees
- Cinematography: John V. Fante; Michael Wiese
- Music by: Richard Wagner
- Distributed by: Pyramid Films
- Release date: October 16, 1978
- Running time: 13 minutes
- Country: United States
- Language: English
- Budget: $8,000
- Box office: $1 million

Hardware Wars is a 1978 American short science fiction parody film in the form of a teaser trailer for a fictitious science fiction film that parodies Star Wars. The 13-minute film, which was released almost 18 months after Star Wars, mainly consisted of inside jokes and visual puns that heavily depended upon audience familiarity with the original. The theme song is Richard Wagner's "Ride of the Valkyries".

== Synopsis ==
The film begins with a parody of the 20th Century Fox logo with "Fox" being replaced with "Foss" (a reference to filmmaker Ernie Fosselius) followed by the text "Meanwhile — in another part of the galaxy — later that same day" (parodying the Star Wars opening crawl "A long time ago in a galaxy far, far away....").

A household steam iron flies through space, fleeing a toaster, which fires toast at it, disabling it. Two robots named 4-Q-2 (resembling the Tin Man from The Wizard of Oz) and Artie-Deco (a canister vacuum cleaner) escape from the evil Empire. After launching from the ship (a cassette player) in an escape pod (a cassette tape), they land on a desert planet (a watermelon). They are found by young Fluke Starbucker, who finds a holographic message recorded in Artie-Deco's memory banks. It is a loop of Princess Anne-Droid saying "Help me, Augie Ben Doggie, you're my only hope." Upon meeting Augie "Ben" Doggie (of the venerable Red-Eye Knights, a pun on The Order of the Jedi Knights), Fluke receives his father's lightsaber (a flashlight). After tricking the Imperial Steam Trooper guards (steam cabinets) to let them into the city, they reach a cantina, which Fluke describes as "too weird". The cantina is a country-and-western bar, where they meet space renegade Ham Salad and Chewchilla the Wookiee Monster (a puppet that resembles an orange version of Cookie Monster from Sesame Street). Meanwhile, the villainous Darph Nader (a pun on Ralph Nader) is interrogating the princess. When she refuses to talk (because she can't understand him; his speech is muffled by his welder's mask), he destroys her peaceful home planet, Basketball (a basketball).

After a light-speed chase, Fluke, Ham, Augie, and the rest are sucked into the enemy base (a waffle iron) by a tractor beam. While the rest of the crew attempt to rescue the princess from the base, Augie tries to shut off the tractor beam, which requires going to an exposed pylon and lowering a switch next to an animated picture of a farm tractor. After they rescue the Princess, Augie Ben Doggie chooses to stay behind to battle Darph Nader, and the rest of the group dismiss him as a "martyr". Their spaceship is assaulted by bits of tin-foil trash, which makes Chewchilla jittery until he spies Princess Anne-Droid's hair whorls, which are cinnamon rolls worn on the sides of her head. He eats one as the princess looks on in disgust.

Fluke joins a squad of spaceships (corkscrews). He is told to "trust your feelings" by the ghostly voice of Augie. The climactic destruction of the enemy base is not shown. The film ends with the voiceover, "May the Farce be with you". The end of the credits state that the production was "filmed on location in space", followed by a statement beginning "All scenes depicting violence towards animals were deleted from the film.", reflecting the legal statement that was beginning to appear in film credits at that time.

== Cast ==
- Frank Robertson as 4-Q-2
- Artie Deco as himself
- Scott Mathews as Fluke Starbucker
- Jeff Hale as Augie "Ben" Doggie
- Cindy Furgatch (Freeling) as Princess Anne-Droid
- Bob Knickerbocker as Ham Salad
- Ernie Fosselius in miscellaneous roles

=== Voice cast ===
- Paul Frees as the narrator
- Sonny Buddy Jr.
- Cindy Furgatch
- Walt Kraemer
- Ernie Fosselius

== Production ==
Hardware Wars was written and directed by San Francisco native Ernie Fosselius and produced by Michael Wiese. It was structured as a mock movie trailer, and Fosselius secured narration from veteran voice-over artist Paul Frees. Fosselius capitalised on his budget limitations by using deliberately-ridiculous household objects as props; spaceships were represented by such items as steam irons, toasters and cassette recorders, and the lightsaber of Fluke Starbucker (Scott Mathews) was a flashlight. The characters, played by actors who were as low-budget as the props, were also parodied in name and appearance; Chewbacca the Wookiee was replaced by Chewchilla the Wookiee Monster (a Cookie Monster puppet dyed brown), and Darth Vader's counterpart Darph Nader (whose name parodied consumer protection advocate Ralph Nader) wore a welding helmet that distorted his voice so much that no one could understand anything he said. Other characters include Ham Salad, Augie "Ben" Doggie, Princess Anne-Droid, and the drones, 4-Q-2 (who resembles the Tin Woodman from The Wizard of Oz) and Arty-Deco (an antique canister vacuum cleaner).

=== Post-production ===
The visual-effects department consisted of John Allardice, Andy Lesniak, Glen David Miller, and Fred Tepper. Allardice later worked on films such as The Girl with the Dragon Tattoo. Lesniak worked on 2013's Man of Steel. Glen David Miller and Fred Tepper worked on 1997's Titanic together. Fosselius also did puppet work and was lead animator and lead editor. He became a sound recordist and editor whose credits include Dragon: The Bruce Lee Story and, coincidentally, Spaceballs.

== Soundtrack ==
The soundtrack for Hardware Wars was performed by the Württemberg Philharmonic Orchestra, conducted by Jonel Perlea, and only featured one song, Richard Wagner's "Ride of the Valkyries", which is quite ironic as this film is a spoof trailer while Wagner's music is world renowned as a marvel of opera. This song from Wagner's epic opera Der Ring des Nibelungen appears in famous films such as Apocalypse Now.

== Legacy ==
When Hardware Wars premiered in 1978, it was the first Star Wars parody. As noted in Shock Cinema Magazine, Hardware Wars "laid the groundwork for every DIY movie send up that now pops up on YouTube… Premiering when George Lucas's cash cow was still filling the theaters, it quickly became a pre-VCR, word-of-mouth phenomenon."

(Actually, the first Star Wars parody was in Donny & Marie, Season 3, episode 1, which was broadcast in 1977. That was, however, officially sanctioned, not a fanfic film. MAD Magazine's parody of Star Wars, Star Roars, which was unauthorized, although George Lucas subsequently wrote in a letter expressing his approval, also predates Hardware Wars as it appeared in their January 1978 issue.)

In 1978, the idea of a spoof film was uncommon. Star Wars spoofs became popular, and countless more parodies were created, notably including the Family Guy extended episode "Blue Harvest", George Lucas In Love, and Spaceballs. The creators of Hardware Wars, Ernie Fosselius and Michael Wiese, seemed to realize their influence on future Star Wars spoofs, particularly on Spaceballs. As noted by Salon, "After the success of 'Hardware Wars,' Wiese and Fosselius resisted the temptation to produce more sci-fi spoofs." "At one time, someone did offer to finance a full-length feature of 'Hardware Wars,' but we passed," Wiese says. "We always knew it was a one-joke movie and wouldn't sustain that length. Of course that didn't stop Mel Brooks from 'quoting' us—some might say ripping us off—with 'Spaceballs.'"

== Reception ==
According to Tested.com, Hardware Wars "was the first parody of Lucas' space opera (Star Wars)—and reportedly one he (George Lucas) enjoyed." According to the book Hollywood's Copyright Wars by Peter Decherney, Hardware Wars created an environment where "George Lucas and his company have acknowledged and embraced fans of their franchise" and have often showcased fan-made films, including Hardware Wars.

Hardware Wars won over 15 first-place film festival awards, including the award for Most Popular Short Film at the Chicago Film Festival. It was also named to the ALA Notable Children's Videos list in 1978. It is considered the most profitable short film of all time, grossing US$1,000,000; considering its paltry US$8,000 budget, its profit ratio was much better than Star Wars. George Lucas said in a 1999 interview on the UK's The Big Breakfast television show that Hardware Wars was his favorite Star Wars parody.

In 2003, the film was honored by Lucasfilm when it was given the Pioneer Award at that year's Official Star Wars Fan Film Awards. In August 2010, Time magazine listed it as one of the Top 10 Star Wars fan films.

In 2017, Rian Johnson paid tribute to it by referencing it in the Star Wars film The Last Jedi in a scene in which a robotic steam iron is briefly framed to resemble a landing spaceship. Johnson said that John Williams had enjoyed creating a bombastic music cue to match the iron descending on a uniform.

As Michael Wiese stated in the book Producers on Producing: The Making of Film and Television by Irv Broughton, "When Ernie Fosselius and I originally made the film we had no idea what to do with it. We just wanted to meet George Lucas, who had made Star Wars. That would have been fine."

In Time Out New York, critic Andrew Johnston wrote: "Thanks to Digital Domain, Hardware Wars now includes a fleet of Corkscrew Fighters as well as effects that parody Lucas's additions to the Tatooine sequence in the first film. The contrast between the slick new effects and the bargain-basement old ones adds a new level of satire to the film and nicely spoofs some of Lucas's less-than-seamless changes to his own film."

== Video releases ==
Hardware Wars had originally been available on film from Pyramid Films. It was first made available commercially on home video with the Warner Home Video release Hardware Wars, and Other Film Farces, which also included another Fosselius parody, Porklips Now. The tape also included Closet Cases of the Nerd Kind and the animated Bambi Meets Godzilla.

To spoof the 1997 "Special Edition" re-release of Star Wars, Hardware Wars was re-released with newly added digital effects. Fosselius did not participate in the new version and objected to the idea of adding polished digital effects to a film whose aesthetic depended on deliberately cheap practical effects. The original version was released on DVD in 2002.

The film was released on DVD in 2002 in its original form, with commentary tracks and other special features.

It was later released on DVD again by Apprehensive Films for its 30th anniversary. This release is approved and licensed from Ernie Fosselius.

On April 23, 2024, MVD Rewind Collection re-released the short on DVD, and for the first time on Blu-ray two weeks later on May 7 containing a 2024 remastered 2K transfer from a 16mm reversal release print created by Vinegar Syndrome. The Blu-ray also contains a 2K HD transfer made in 2012 from the original camera negative supervised by Ernie Fosselius.
