= Peter Biskind =

American historian, journalist and editor

- Born: 1940 (age 84–85)
- Occupations: Writer; critic; journalist

Peter Biskind (born 1940) is an American cultural critic, film historian, journalist and former executive editor of Premiere magazine from 1986 to 1996.

== Biography ==
He attended Swarthmore College and wrote several books depicting life in Hollywood, including Seeing Is Believing, Easy Riders, Raging Bulls, Down and Dirty Pictures, and Gods and Monsters, some of which were bestsellers. In 2010, he published a biography of director and actor Warren Beatty, entitled Star: How Warren Beatty Seduced America.

Biskind is a contributing editor at Vanity Fair. His work has appeared in publications such as Rolling Stone, The Washington Post, Paris Match, The Nation, The New York Times, The Times (London), and the Los Angeles Times, as well as in film journals such as Sight and Sound and Film Quarterly. He and his wife Elizabeth Hess were both on the editorial staff of Seven Days magazine in the late 1970s.

He served as the editor-in-chief of American Film from 1981 to 1986.

Biskind's books have been translated into more than thirty languages.

== Criticism ==
Roger Ebert had been critical of Biskind since the publications of Easy Riders, Raging Bulls and Down and Dirty Pictures, saying: "Biskind has a way of massaging his stories to suit his agenda." In particular, Ebert drew attention to an alleged encounter with director Todd Haynes at a film festival, where Haynes presented his film Poison. According to Biskind's claims, Ebert declared: "Who the hell is Todd Haynes?" when introduced to him and snatched his hand away from an offered handshake. Ebert denies this event ever took place, as did Christine Vachon, Biskind's alleged source of the anecdote.

== Selected bibliography ==
Books

- (1983). Seeing Is Believing: How Hollywood Taught Us to Stop Worrying and Love the Fifties. New York: Pantheon Books.
- (1990). The Godfather Companion: Everything You Ever Wanted To Know About All Three Godfather Films. New York, NY: HarperPerennial.
- (1998). Easy Riders, Raging Bulls: How the Sex-Drugs-and-Rock-'n'-Roll Generation Saved Hollywood. New York, NY: Simon & Schuster.
- (2004). Down and Dirty Pictures: Miramax, Sundance, and the Rise of Independent Film. New York: Simon & Schuster.
- (2004). Gods and Monsters: Thirty Years of Writing on Film and Culture From One of America's Most Incisive Writers. New York: Nation Books.
- (2010). Star: How Warren Beatty Seduced America. New York: Simon & Schuster.
- (2013). My Lunches With Orson: Conversations between Henry Jaglom and Orson Welles. New York: Metropolitan Books.
- (2018). The Sky is Falling: How Vampires, Zombies, Androids and Superheroes Made America Great For Extremism. New York: The New Press.
- (2023). Pandora's Box: How Guts, Guile, and Greed Upended TV. New York: William Morrow.

Essays

- Peter Biskind's "Foreword" and his essay "Inside Indiewood" (April 3, 2000) are included in: Bromley, C. (2000). Cinema Nation: The Best Writing on Film from 'The Nation,' 1913–2000. New York: Thunder Mouth Press/Nation Books.
- "Reconstructing Woody", Vanity Fair, December 2005.
- "Thunder on the Left: The Making of Reds", Vanity Fair, March 2006.
- "The Vietnam Oscars", Vanity Fair, March 2008.
- Biskind's Vanity Fair articles "Midnight Revolution" and "Thunder on the Left" are included in: Graydon Carter, editor (2008). Vanity Fair's Tales of Hollywood: Rebels, Reds, and Graduates and the Wild Stories Behind the Making of 13 Iconic Films. New York, N.Y.: Penguin Books.
