= South Great George's Street =

Street in central Dublin, Ireland

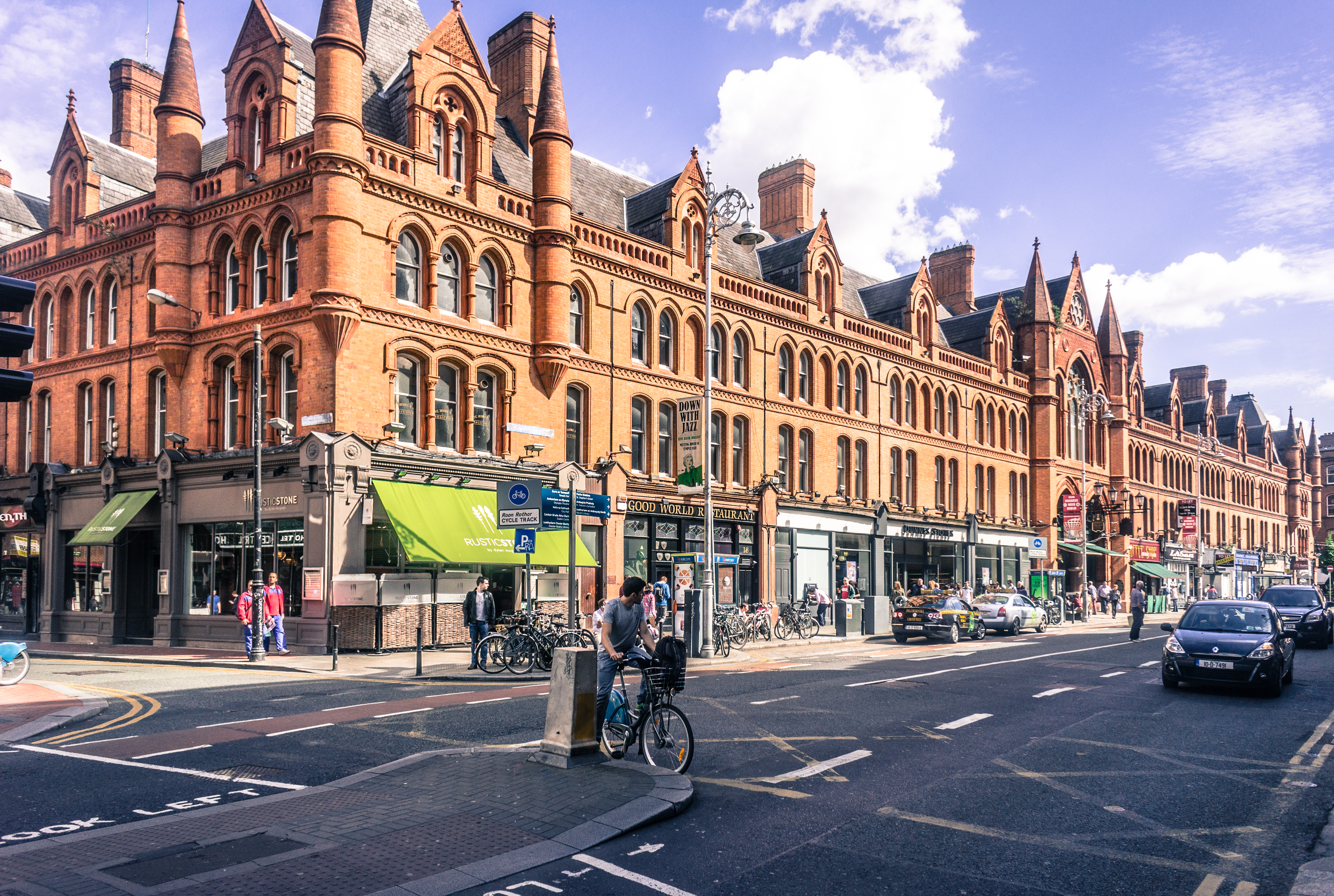
- Victorian-era shops and restaurants along George's Street, including the George's Street Arcade

- Location within Central Dublin
- Native name: Sráid Sheoirse Mhór Theas (Irish)
- Former name: George's Lane
- Namesake: St. George's Church
- Length: 300 m (980 ft)
- Width: 18 metres (59 ft)
- Location: Dublin, Ireland
- Postal code: D02
- Coordinates: 53.342792°N 6.264444°W
- north end: Dame Street
- south end: Aungier Street, Stephen Street

Other
- Known for: George's Street Arcade, The George gay community, restaurants

South Great George's Street (Irish: Sráid Sheoirse Mhór Theas) is a street in south-central Dublin, Ireland.

== History ==
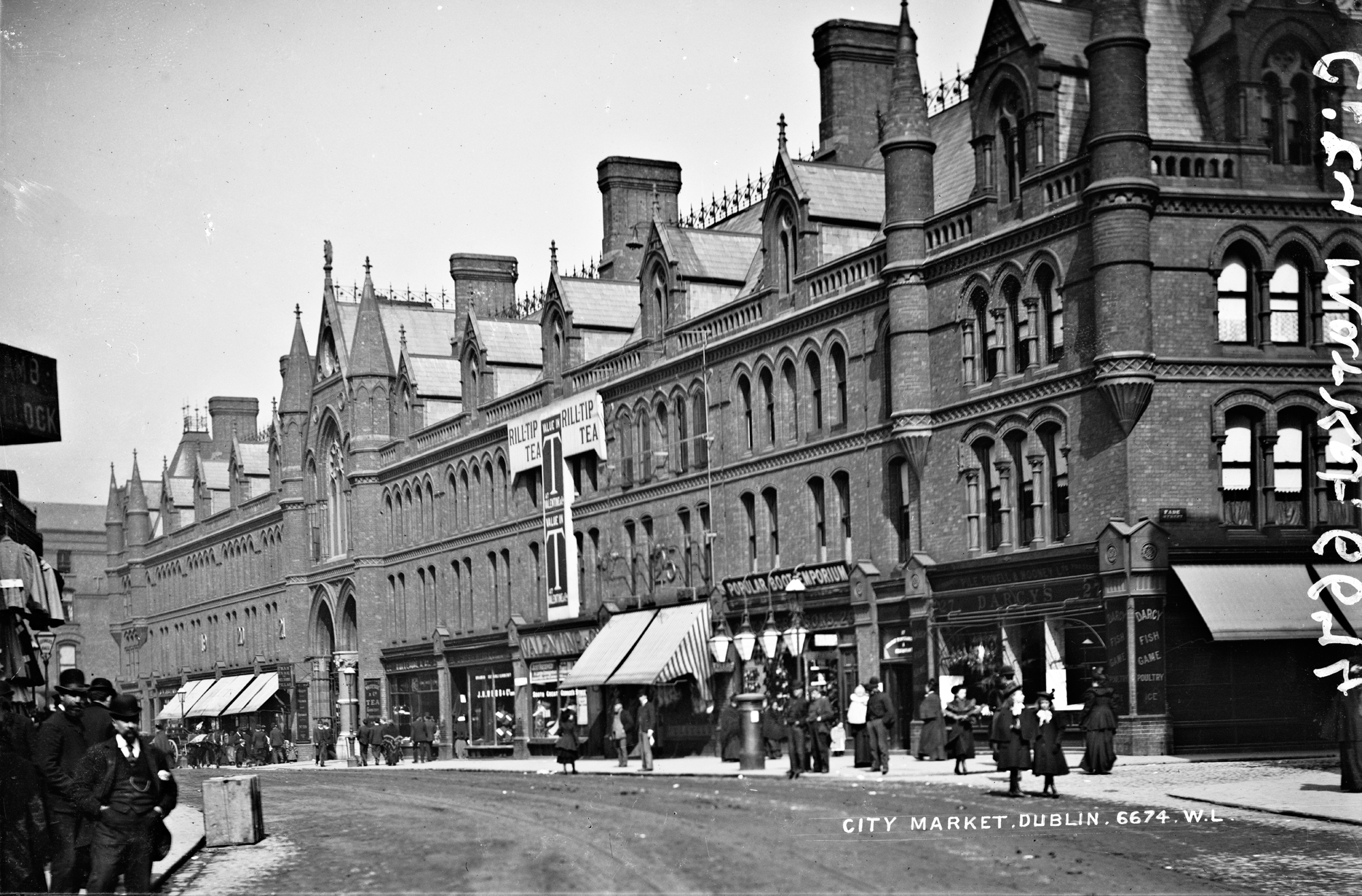
View of the South Great George's Street Market, c. 1895–99

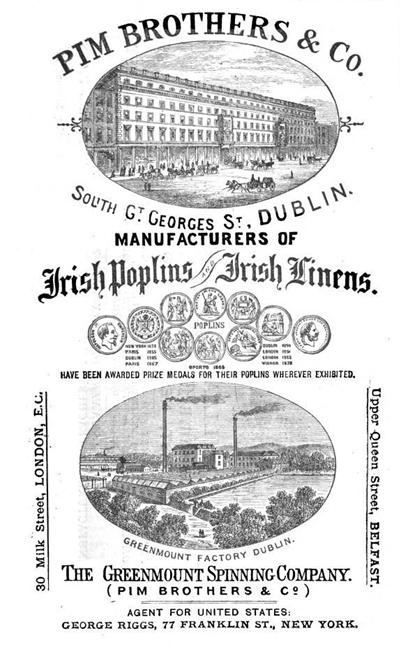
Pim Brothers South Great George's Street store in 1876

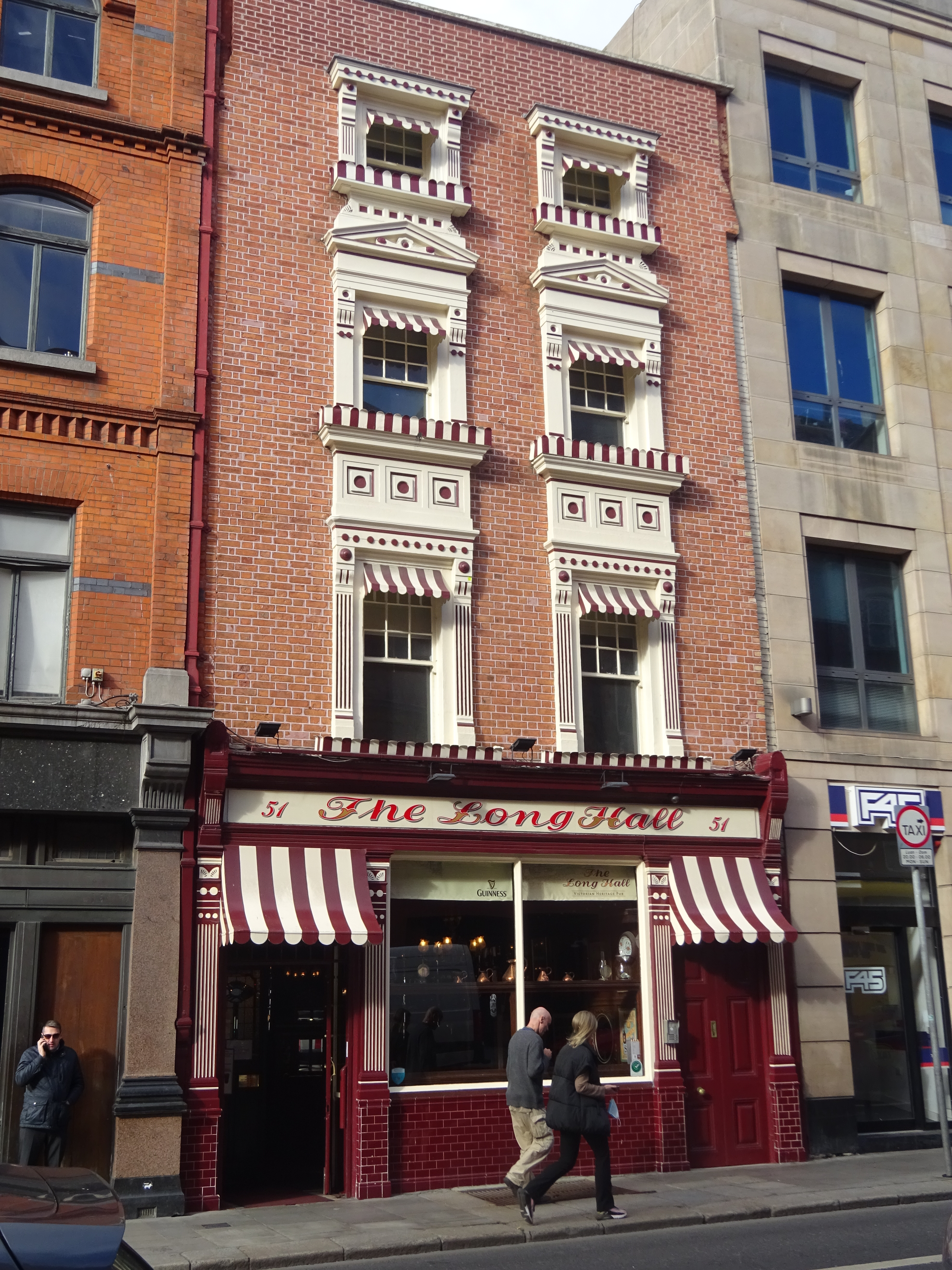
The Long Hall pub, 51 South Great George's Street

=== Early history and naming ===
The area around the street can trace human habitation as far back as at least Early Scandinavian Dublin. Four burials excavated near South Great George's Street were also associated with domestic habitations, suggesting that the deceased had been members of a settled Norse community, and not the fatalities suffered by a transient raiding party.

The street was originally later called St George's Lane and takes its name from a church dedicated to Saint George, patron of England and lepers, which stood here in 1181. The church was rebuilt in 1213 and stood until demolition in 1586.

The street is still referred to as St Georges Lane on John Speed's Map of Dublin (1610).

By 1766 it is being called St George's Street, but in 1773 the northern end still referred to as Lane.

It is thought that South Great George's Street follows the course of an early medieval route – or possibly even the eastern boundary of a longphort, assuming that there was a naval encampment along the eastern shore of the Black Pool (Dubh Linn) of Dublin at some stage in the settlement's early history.

=== 18th to 19th centuries ===
The acrobat Madame Violante opened a theatre on George's Lane in 1731. The building subsequently became the Dublin Lying-In Hospital in 1745, which was the first maternity hospital in the British Isles. Later, relocated, it became the Rotunda Hospital. The earlier premises subsequently became a hospital for treating venereal diseases until 1769; the treatment subsequently moved to the Westmoreland Lock Hospital.

The Castle Market was held here in the 18th century. In 1765, George's Lane hosted the first exhibition by the Society of Dublin Artists.

In the 1780s, the street was rebuilt by the Wide Streets Commission and renamed South Great George's Street (the name distinguishes it from North Great George's Street, located on the Northside).

Pim Brothers & Co. drapery store and warehouse opened on a building at the lower end of the street around 1843. It was refurbished ten years later by Sandham Symes. The premises closed in 1970 and is now a government office.

During Queen Victoria's 1849 visit, shortly after the Great Famine, a pharmacist on South Great George's Street flew a black flag with a crownless harp and black banners with the words "Famine" and "Pestilence"; these were removed by the Dublin Metropolitan Police.

The South City Markets (today George's Street Arcade) opened in 1881 and were designed by Lockwood and Mawson. One of the central landmarks the building is an ornate red brick and terracotta structure which originally housed a glass-covered marketplace. The market was gutted after a serious fire in 1892, and was replaced with intersecting arcades in a cruciform plan designed by William Henry Byrne. This interior has since been remodelled, but some original elements are still visible. Bewley's café opened in 1894 and remained on the street until 1999.

=== 20th to 21st centuries ===
Like many parts of Dublin in the 1960s and 1970s, parts of the street were redeveloped as office space. Known as "the two ugly sisters", Castle House and Wicklow House were built on the western side of the street. They were built on the site of the former Pim's department store using pre-cast concrete with aluminium-fronted retail spaces on the ground floor. They were designed by the London architecture firm Arthur Swift and Partners.

The Victorian interior of the Long Hall pub on the street was featured in the video for the 1982 song Old Town by Phil Lynott.

In the 20th century, the street became popular with homosexuals, despite homosexuality being illegal until 1993. The George, Dublin's premier gay bar, opened in 1985 and has become a centre of the LGBT community. The Dragon, a rival, opened in 2006.

== Cultural depictions ==
South Great George's Street appears several times in the work of James Joyce:

He paid twopence halfpenny to the slatternly girl and went out of the shop to begin his wandering again. He went into Capel Street and walked along towards the City Hall. Then he turned into Dame Street. At the corner of George's Street he met two friends of his and stopped to converse with them. He was glad that he could rest from all his walking. His friends asked him if had he seen Corley and what was the latest. He replied that he had spent the day with Corley. His friends talked very little. They looked vacantly after some figures in the crowd and sometimes made a critical remark. One said that he had seen Mac an hour before in Westmoreland Street. At this Lenehan said that he had been with Mac the night before in Egan's. The young man who had seen Mac in Westmoreland Street asked was it true that Mac had won a bit over a billiard match. Lenehan did not know: he said that Holohan had stood them drinks in Egan's.

He left his friends at a quarter to ten and went up George's Street. He turned to the left at the City Markets and walked on into Grafton Street.

— "Two Gallants" (Dubliners)

He had been for many years cashier of a private bank in Baggot Street. Every morning he came in from Chapelizod by tram. At midday, he went to Dan Burke's and took his lunch—a bottle of lager beer and a small trayful of arrowroot biscuits. At four o'clock he was set free. He dined in an eating-house in George's Street where he felt safe from the society of Dublin's gilded youth and where there was a certain plain honesty in the bill of fare. His evenings were spent either before his landlady's piano or roaming about the outskirts of the city. His liking for Mozart's music brought him sometimes to an opera or a concert: these were the only dissipations of his life.

[…]

One of his sentences, written two months after his last interview with Mrs Sinico, read: Love between man and man is impossible because there must not be sexual intercourse and friendship between man and woman is impossible because there must be sexual intercourse. He kept away from concerts lest he should meet her. His father died; the junior partner of the bank retired. And still, every morning he went into the city by tram and every evening walked home from the city after having dined moderately in George's Street and read the evening paper for dessert.

— "A Painful Case" (Dubliners)

Three and eleven she paid for those stockings in Sparrow's of George's street on the Tuesday, no the Monday before Easter and there wasn't a brack on them and that was what he was looking at, transparent, and not at her insignificant ones that had neither shape nor form (the cheek of her!) because he had eyes in his head to see the difference for himself.

— Ulysses

Annie Sparrow's shop was located at 16 South Great George's Street.

What also stimulated him in his cogitations?
The financial success achieved by Ephraim Marks and Charles A. James, the former by his 1d bazaar at 42 George's street, south, the latter at his 6 1/2d shop and world's fancy fair and waxwork exhibition at 30 Henry street, admission 2d, children 1d: and the infinite possibilities hitherto unexploited of the modern art of advertisement if condensed in triliteral monoideal symbols, vertically of maximum visibility (divined), horizontally of maximum legibility (deciphered) and of magnetising efficacy to arrest involuntary attention, to interest, to convince, to decide.

— Ulysses

== See also ==
- List of streets and squares in Dublin
