= Geoff Bennett (speedway rider) =

British motorcycle speedway rider

- Born: 24 February 1924; Birmingham, England
- Died: 24 June 2014 (aged 90); Stratford-upon-Avon, England
- Nationality: British (English)

Career history
- 1947–1954: Birmingham Brummies
- 1947, 1952: Cradley Heath Cubs

Team honours
- 1948: National Trophy (tier 2)
- 1948: Anniversary Cup (Div 2) winner

Geoffrey Edwin Bennett (24 February 1924 – 24 June 2014) was a motorcycle speedway rider from England.

== Biography ==
Bennett, born in Birmingham, was recruited by Tiger Stevenson of the Birmingham Brummies, after Bennett had ridden on continental tracks and had been demobbed from the British Army in 1947. He began his British leagues career riding for Birmingham and then Cradley Heath Cubs during the 1947 Speedway National League Division Three season, where he topped the team's averages.

The following year in 1948, Bennett rode for Birmingham, improving his average to 7.91 and winning the National Trophy (tier 2) with the team. The team moved up to the top league in 1949. He also reached the Championship round of the 1949 Individual Speedway World Championship.

In 1950, Bennett was a heat leader for the Brummies and rode 49 times for them during the season, averaging 8.19 and again reached the Championship round of the 1950 Individual Speedway World Championship.

The 1951 season started well, with Bennett being named the new Birmingham captain but then in April, he broke his leg racing at the Chapelizod Sports Stadium in Dublin and he would miss the entire season. The following season, he was named captain again for Birmingham but after just a few matches he injured his knee and it was clear that he had not fully recovered from his injuries. He returned to Cradley Heath on loan in division 2 for the season.

Bennett remained on Birmingham's books for both the 1953 and 1954 seasons, but only rode a few matches after changing his mind several times about retiring.
