= Ghost story =

Literary genre, work of literature featuring supernatural elements

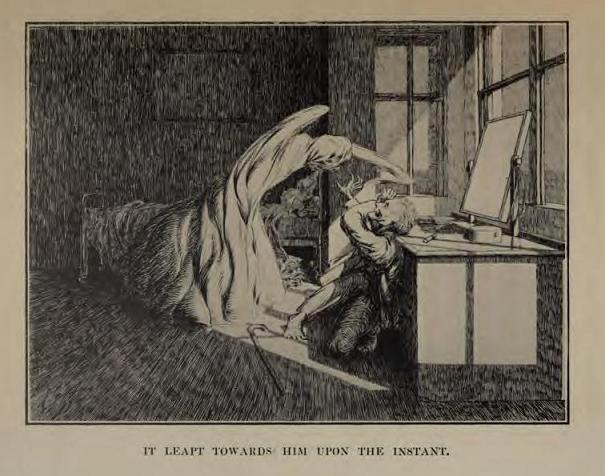
Illustration by James McBryde for M. R. James's story "Oh, Whistle, and I'll Come to You, My Lad" (1904).

A ghost story is any piece of fiction, or drama, that includes a ghost, or simply takes as a premise the possibility of ghosts or characters' belief in them. The "ghost" may appear of its own accord or be summoned by magic. Linked to the ghost is the idea of a "haunting", where a supernatural entity is tied to a place, object or person. Ghost stories are commonly examples of ghostlore.

Colloquially, the term "ghost story" can refer to any kind of scary story. In a narrower sense, the ghost story has been developed as a short story format, within genre fiction. It is a form of supernatural fiction and specifically of weird fiction, and is often a horror story.

While ghost stories are often explicitly meant to scare, they have been written to serve all sorts of purposes, from comedy to morality tales. Ghosts often appear in the narrative as sentinels or prophets of things to come.

== History ==
Fragment of a jar with the story Khonsuemheb and the Ghost written in Hieratic, between 1292 and 1076 BC (New Kingdom of Egypt). Museo Egizio, Turin.

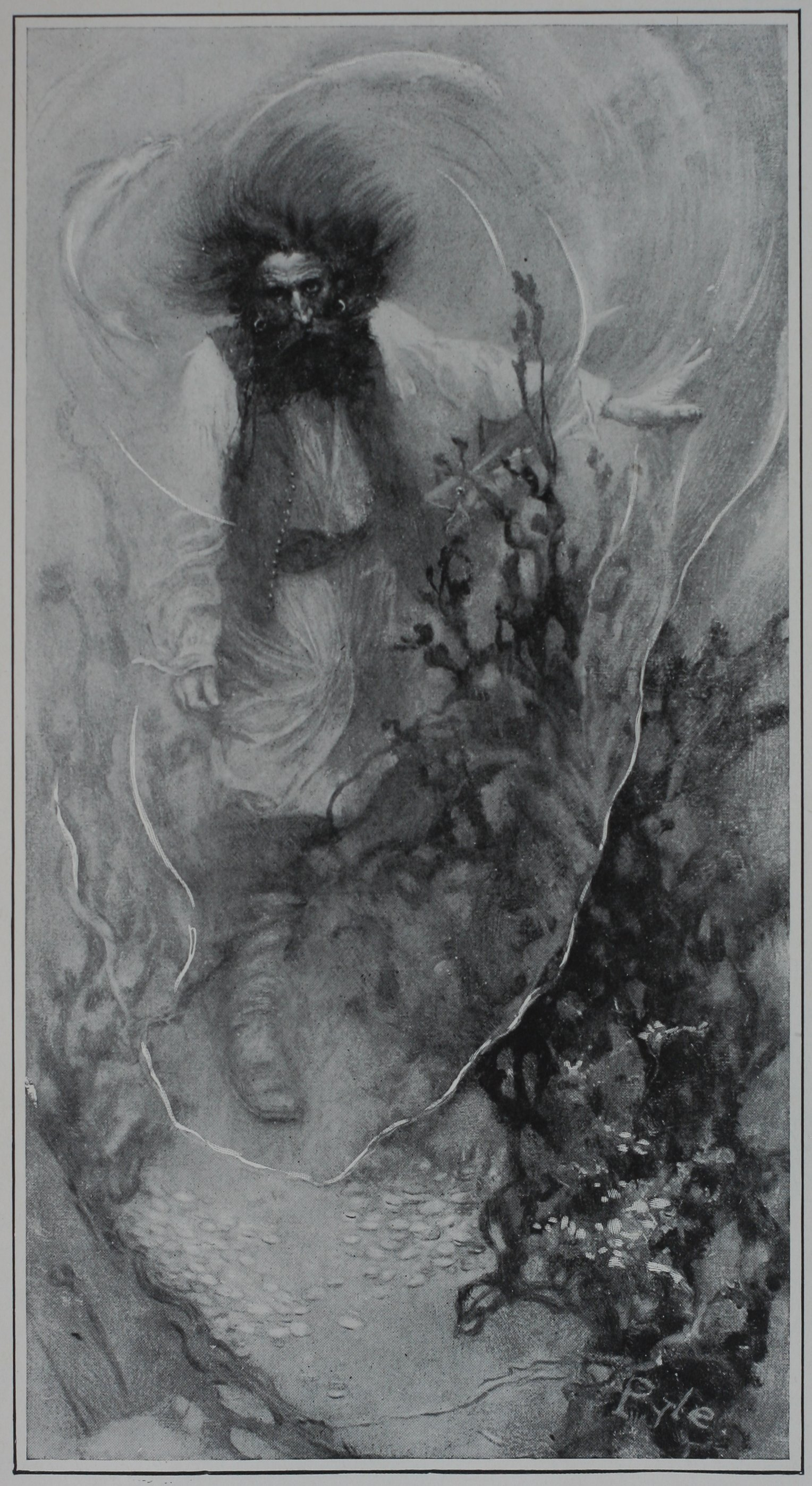
The ghost of a pirate, from Howard Pyle's Book of Pirates (1903)

A widespread belief concerning ghosts is that they are composed of a misty, airy, or subtle material. Anthropologists link this idea to early beliefs that ghosts were the person within the person (the person's spirit), most noticeable in ancient cultures as a person's breath, which upon exhaling in colder climates appears visibly as a white mist. Belief in ghosts is found in all cultures around the world, and thus ghost stories may be passed down orally or in written form.

The campfire story, a form of oral storytelling, often involves recounting ghost stories, or other scary stories. Some of the stories are decades old, with varying versions across multiple cultures. Many schools and educational institutions encourage ghost storytelling as part of literature.

In 1929, five key features of the English ghost story were identified in "Some Remarks on Ghost Stories" by M. R. James. As summarized by Frank Coffman for a course in popular imaginative literature, they were:

- The pretense of truth
- "A pleasing terror"
- No gratuitous bloodshed or sex
- No "explanation of the machinery"
- Setting: "those of the writer's (and reader's) own day"

== Literature ==
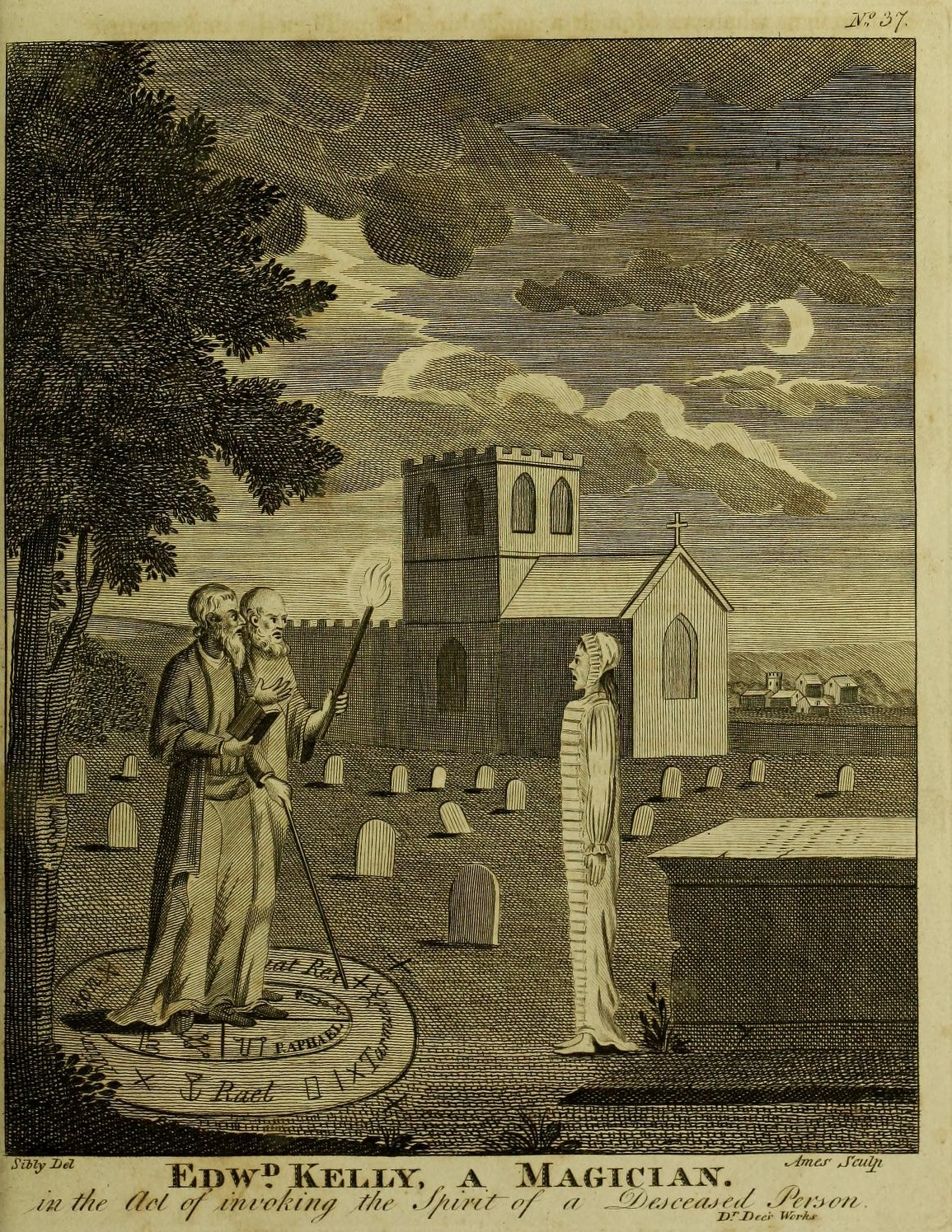
John Dee and Edward Kelley invoking the spirit of a deceased person (engraving from the Astrology by Ebenezer Sibly, 1806)

=== Early examples ===
Ghosts in the classical world often appeared in the form of vapor or smoke, but at other times they were described as being substantial, appearing as they had been at the time of death, complete with the wounds that killed them. Spirits of the dead appear in literature as early as Homer's Odyssey, which features a journey to the underworld and the hero encountering the ghosts of the dead, as well as the Old Testament in which the Witch of Endor calls the spirit of the prophet Samuel.

The play Mostellaria, by the Roman playwright Plautus, is the earliest known work to feature a haunted dwelling, and is sometimes translated as The Haunted House. Another early account of a haunted place comes from an account by Pliny the Younger (c. 50 AD). Pliny describes the haunting of a house in Athens by a ghost bound in chains, an archetype that would become familiar in later literature.

Ghosts often appeared in the tragedies of the Roman writer Seneca, who would later influence the revival of tragedy on the Renaissance stage, particularly Thomas Kyd and Shakespeare.

The One Thousand and One Nights, sometimes known as Arabian Nights, contains a number of ghost stories, often involving jinn (also spelled as djinn), ghouls and corpses. In particular, the tale of "Ali the Cairene and the Haunted House in Baghdad" revolves around a house haunted by jinns. Other medieval Arabic literature, such as the Encyclopedia of the Brethren of Purity, also contain ghost stories.

The 11th century Japanese work The Tale of Genji contains ghost stories, and includes characters being possessed by spirits.

=== English Renaissance theatre ===
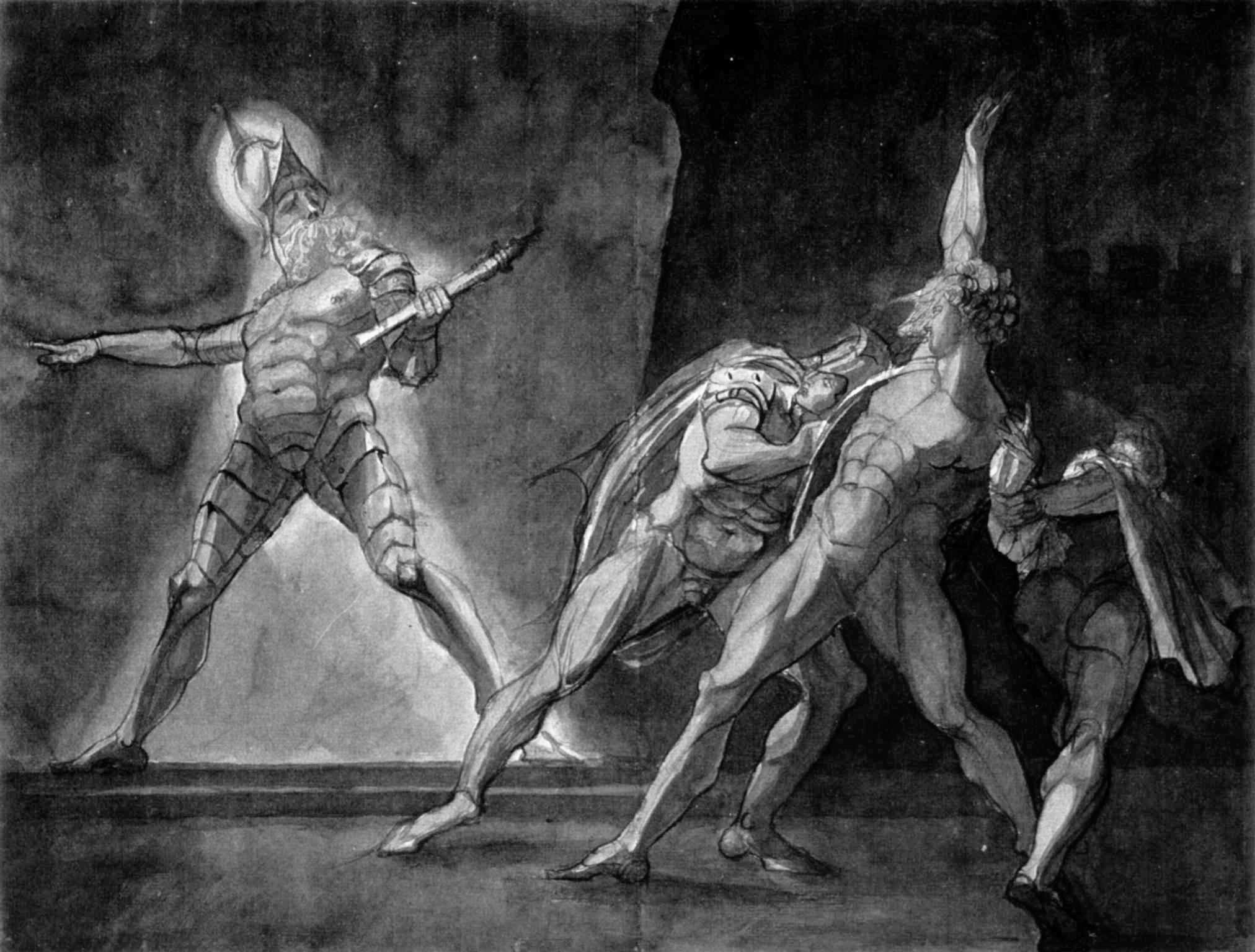
"Hamlet and his father's ghost" by Henry Fuseli (1780s drawing). The ghost is wearing stylised plate armour in 17th-century style, including a morion type helmet and tassets. Depicting ghosts as wearing armour, to suggest a sense of antiquity, was common in Elizabethan theatre.

In the mid-16th century, the works of Seneca were rediscovered by Italian humanists, and they became the models for the revival of tragedy. Seneca's influence is particularly evident in Thomas Kyd's The Spanish Tragedy and Shakespeare's Hamlet, both of which share a revenge theme, a corpse-strewn climax, and ghosts among the cast. The ghosts in Richard III also resemble the Senecan model, while the ghost in Hamlet plays a more complex role. The shade of Hamlet's murdered father in Hamlet has become one of the more recognizable ghosts in English literature. In another of Shakespeare's works, Macbeth, the murdered Banquo returns as a ghost to the dismay of the title character.

In English Renaissance theatre, ghosts were often depicted in the garb of the living and even in armour. Armour, being out-of-date by the time of the Renaissance, gave the stage ghost a sense of antiquity. The sheeted ghost began to gain ground on stage in the 1800s because an armoured ghost had to be moved about by complicated pulley systems or lifts, and eventually became clichéd stage elements and objects of ridicule. Ann Jones and Peter Stallybrass, in Renaissance Clothing and the Materials of Memory, point out, "In fact, it is as laughter increasingly threatens the Ghost that he starts to be staged not in armor but in some form of 'spirit drapery'." An interesting observation by Jones and Stallybrass is that "at the historical point at which ghosts themselves become increasingly implausible, at least to an educated elite, to believe in them at all it seems to be necessary to assert their immateriality, their invisibility. [...] The drapery of ghosts must now, indeed, be as spiritual as the ghosts themselves. This is a striking departure both from the ghosts of the Renaissance stage and from the Greek and Roman theatrical ghosts upon which that stage drew. The most prominent feature of Renaissance ghosts is precisely their gross materiality. They appear to us conspicuously clothed."

In Spain, the legend of Catalina Lercaro stands out, a young woman from the 16th century, who committed suicide so as not to have to marry a man she did not love. From here, many people claim to see her ghost.

=== Border ballads ===
Ghosts figured prominently in traditional British ballads of the 16th and 17th centuries, particularly the “Border Ballads” of the turbulent border country between England and Scotland. Ballads of this type include "The Unquiet Grave", "The Wife of Usher's Well", and "Sweet William's Ghost", which feature the recurring theme of returning dead lovers or children. In the ballad "King Henry", a particularly ravenous ghost devours the king's horse and hounds before forcing the king into bed. The king then awakens to find the ghost transformed into a beautiful woman. The Flying Dutchman was a ghost ship that became the subject of many ghost stories.

=== Romantic era ===
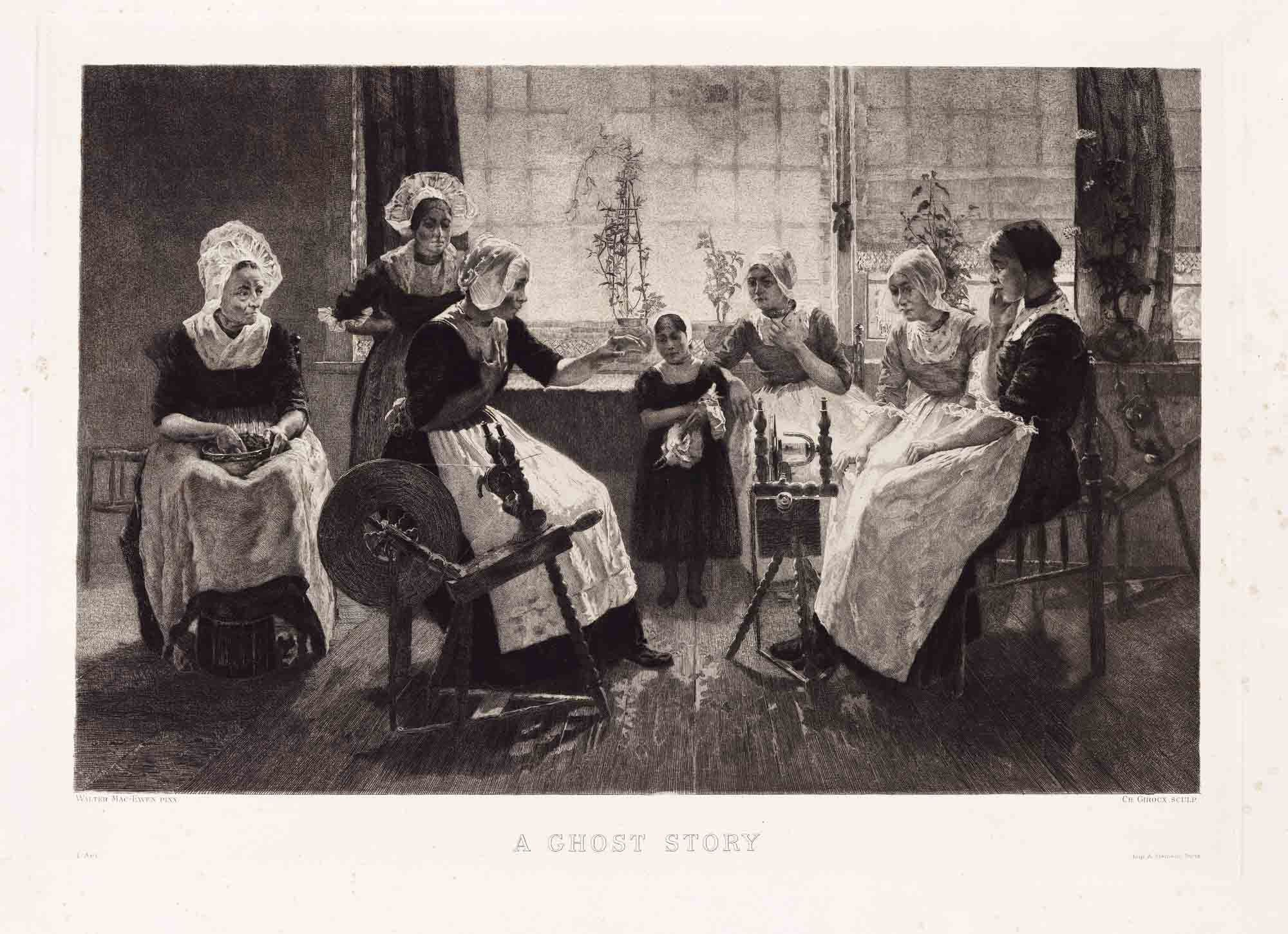
Depiction of a woman telling a ghost story.

One of the key early appearances by ghosts was The Castle of Otranto by Horace Walpole in 1764, considered to be the first gothic novel. However, although the ghost story shares the use of the supernatural with the Gothic novel, the two forms differ. Ghost stories, unlike Gothic fiction, usually take place in a time and location near to the audience of the story.

The modern short story emerged in Germany in the early decades of the 19th century. Kleist's "The Beggar Woman of Locarno", published in 1810, and several other works from the period lay claim to being the first ghost short stories of a modern type. E. T. A. Hoffmann's ghost stories include "The Elementary Spirit" and "The Mines of Falun".

The Russian equivalent of the ghost story is the bylichka. Notable examples of the genre from the 1830s include Gogol's "Viy" and Pushkin's "The Queen of Spades", although there were scores of other stories from lesser known writers, produced primarily as Christmas fiction. The Vosges mountain range is the setting for most ghost stories by the French writing team of Erckmann-Chatrian.

One of the earliest writers of ghost stories in English was Sir Walter Scott. His ghost stories, "Wandering Willie's Tale" (1824, first published as part of Redgauntlet) and The Tapestried Chamber (1828) eschewed the "Gothic" style of writing and helped set an example for later writers in the genre.

=== "Golden Age of the Ghost Story" ===
Historian of the ghost story Jack Sullivan has noted that many literary critics argue a "Golden Age of the Ghost Story" existed between the decline of the Gothic novel in the 1830s and the start of the First World War. Sullivan argues that the work of Edgar Allan Poe and Sheridan Le Fanu inaugurated this "Golden Age".

Irish author Sheridan Le Fanu was one of the most influential writers of ghost stories. Le Fanu's collections, such as In a Glass Darkly (1872) and The Purcell Papers (1880), helped popularise the short story as a medium for ghost fiction. Charlotte Riddell, who wrote fiction as Mrs. J. H. Riddell, created ghost stories which were noted for adept use of the haunted house theme.

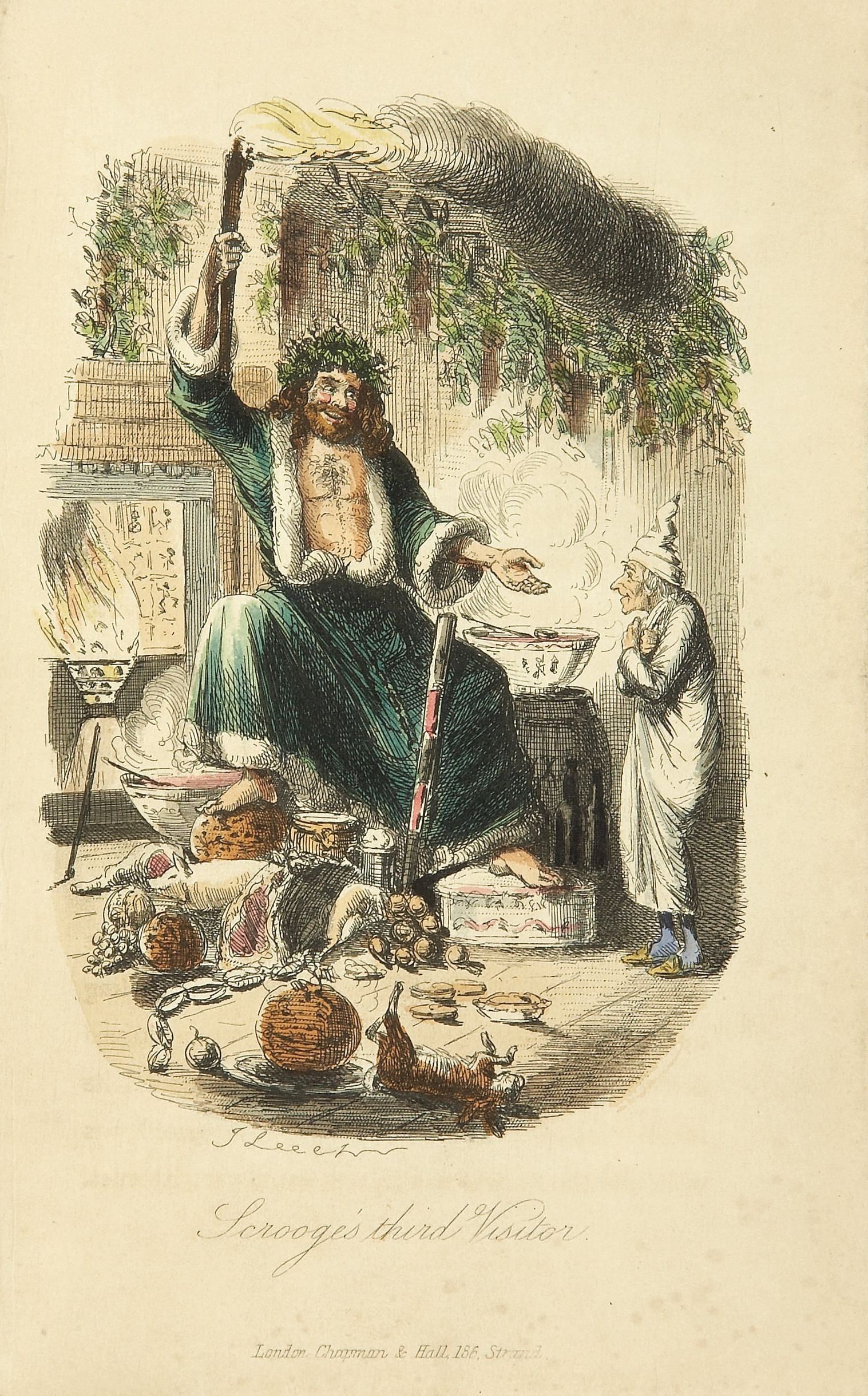
19th-century etching by John Leech of the Ghost of Christmas Present as depicted in Charles Dickens' A Christmas Carol

The "classic" ghost story arose during the Victorian period, and included authors such as M. R. James, Sheridan Le Fanu, Violet Hunt, and Henry James. Classic ghost stories were influenced by the gothic fiction tradition, and contain elements of folklore and psychology. M. R. James summed up the essential elements of a ghost story as, "Malevolence and terror, the glare of evil faces, 'the stony grin of unearthly malice', pursuing forms in darkness, and 'long-drawn, distant screams', are all in place, and so is a modicum of blood, shed with deliberation and carefully husbanded ...".

Famous literary apparitions from the Victorian period are the ghosts of A Christmas Carol, in which Ebenezer Scrooge is helped to see the error of his ways by the ghost of his former colleague Jacob Marley, and the ghosts of Christmas Past, Christmas Present and Christmas Yet to Come. In a precursor to A Christmas Carol Dickens published "The Story of the Goblins Who Stole a Sexton". Dickens also wrote "The Signal-Man", another work featuring a ghost.

==== Jamesian style ====
David Langford has described British author M. R. James as writing "the 20th century's most influential canon of ghost stories". James perfected a method of story-telling which has since become known as Jamesian, which involved abandoning many of the traditional Gothic elements of his predecessors. The classic Jamesian tale usually includes the following elements:

1. a characterful setting in an English village, seaside town or country estate; an ancient town in France, Denmark or Sweden; or a venerable abbey or university
2. a nondescript and rather naïve gentleman-scholar as protagonist (often of a reserved nature)
3. the discovery of an old book or other antiquarian object that somehow unlocks, calls down the wrath, or at least attracts the unwelcome attention of a supernatural menace, usually from beyond the grave

According to James, the story must "put the reader into the position of saying to himself, 'If I'm not very careful, something of this kind may happen to me!'" He also perfected the technique of narrating supernatural events through implication and suggestion, letting his reader fill in the blanks, and focusing on the mundane details of his settings and characters in order to throw the horrific and bizarre elements into greater relief. He summed up his approach in his foreword to the anthology Ghosts and Marvels (Oxford, 1924): "Two ingredients most valuable in the concocting of a ghost story are, to me, the atmosphere and the nicely managed crescendo. ... Let us, then, be introduced to the actors in a placid way; let us see them going about their ordinary business, undisturbed by forebodings, pleased with their surroundings; and into this calm environment let the ominous thing put out its head, unobtrusively at first, and then more insistently, until it holds the stage."

Another aspect James considered a requisite was "that the ghost should be malevolent or odious: amiable and helpful apparitions are all very well in fairy tales or in local legends, but I have no use for them in a fictitious ghost story."

Despite his suggestion in the essay "Stories I Have Tried to Write" that writers employ reticence in their work, many of James's tales depict scenes and images of savage and often disturbing violence.

=== 19th-century American writers ===
Influenced by British and German examples, American writers began to produce their own ghost stories. Washington Irving's short story "The Legend of Sleepy Hollow" (1820), based on an earlier German folktale, features a Headless Horseman. It has been adapted for film and television many times, such as Sleepy Hollow, a successful 1999 feature film. Irving also wrote "The Adventure of the German Student" and Edgar Allan Poe wrote some stories which contain ghosts, such as "The Masque of the Red Death" and "Morella".

In the later 19th century, mainstream American writers such as Edith Wharton, Mary E. Wilkins Freeman and F. Marion Crawford all wrote ghost fiction. Henry James also wrote ghost stories, including "The Jolly Corner" and The Turn of the Screw. The Turn of the Screw, his most famous ghost story, has appeared in a number of adaptations, notably a film, The Innocents, and an opera, Benjamin Britten's The Turn of the Screw.

The introduction of pulp magazines in the early 1900s created new avenues for ghost stories to be published, and they also began to appear in publications such as Good Housekeeping and The New Yorker.

=== Comedies and operas ===
Oscar Telgmann's opera Leo, the Royal Cadet (1885) includes "Judge's Song" about a ghost at the Royal Military College of Canada in Kingston, Ontario.

Oscar Wilde's comic short story "The Canterville Ghost" (1887) has been adapted for film and television on several occasions.

In the United States, prior to and during the First World War, folklorists Olive Dame Campbell and Cecil Sharp collected ballads from the people of the Appalachian Mountains, which included ghostly themes such as "The Cruel Ship's Carpenter", "The Suffolk Miracle", "The Unquiet Grave" and "The Wife of Usher's Well". The theme of these ballads was often the return of a dead lover. These songs were variants of traditional British ballads handed down by generations of mountaineers descended from the people of the Anglo-Scottish border region.

=== Psychological horror ===
In the Edwardian era, Algernon Blackwood (who combined the ghost story with nature mysticism), Oliver Onions (whose ghost stories drew on psychological horror), and William Hope Hodgson (whose ghost tales also contained elements of the sea story and science fiction) helped move the ghost story in new directions.

=== Kaidan ===
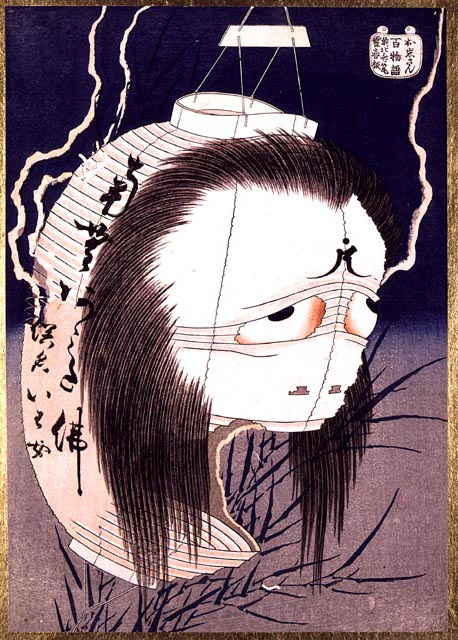
Print by Katsushika Hokusai. Illustration for a classical Japanese kaidan story Yotsuya from the series One Hundred Tales (Hyaku monogatari). The ghost of Oiwa manifesting herself as a lantern obake.

Kaidan (怪談), which literally means "supernatural tale" or "weird tale", is a form of Japanese ghost story. Kaidan entered the vernacular when a game called Hyakumonogatari Kaidankai became popular in the Edo period. The popularity of the game, as well as the acquisition of a printing press, led to the creation of a literary genre called Kaidanshu. Kaidan are not always horror stories, they can "be funny, or strange, or just telling about an odd thing that happened one time".

Lafcadio Hearn published Kwaidan: Stories and Studies of Strange Things in 1904 as a collection of Japanese ghost stories which was also adapted into a film. The book "is seen as the first introduction of Japanese superstition to European and American audiences".

=== Modern era (1920 onward) ===
Ghost Stories magazine, which contained almost nothing but ghost stories, was published from 1926 to 1932.

Beginning in the 1940s, Fritz Leiber wrote ghost tales set in modern industrial settings, such as "Smoke Ghost" (1941) and "A Bit of the Dark World" (1962). Shirley Jackson made an important contribution to ghost fiction with her novel The Haunting of Hill House (1959).

A noted modern British writer of ghost fiction is Ramsey Campbell. Susan Hill also produced The Woman in Black (1983), a ghost novel that has been adapted for stage, television and film.

Noël Coward's play Blithe Spirit, later made into a 1945 film, places a more humorous slant on the phenomenon of haunting of individuals and specific locations.

== Film ==
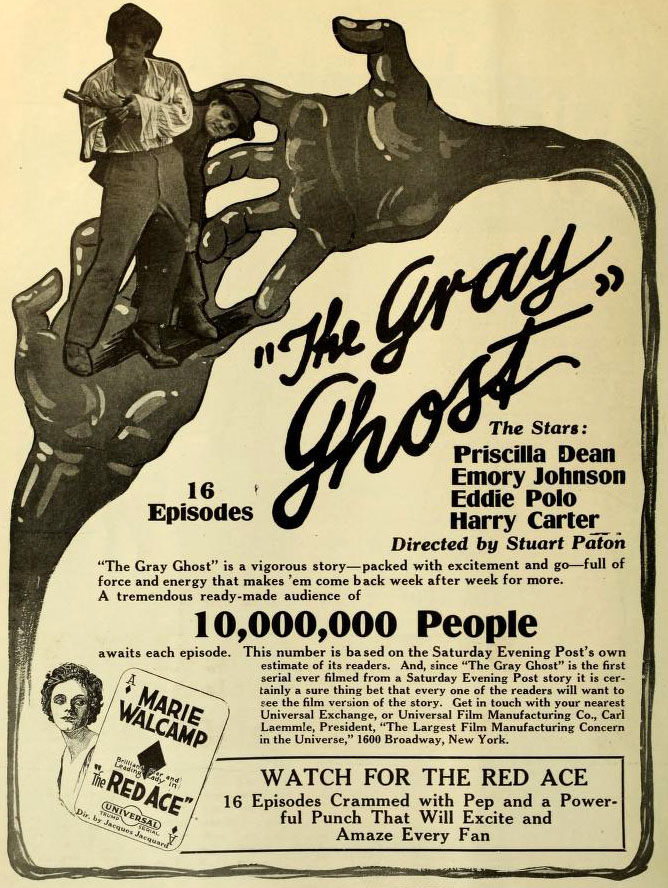
The Gray Ghost (1917).

During the late 1890s the depiction of ghosts and supernatural events appear in films. With the advent of motion pictures and television, screen depictions of ghosts became common, and spanned a variety of genres. The works of Shakespeare, Dickens and Wilde have all been made into cinematic versions, as well as adaptations of other playwrights and novelists. One of the well known short films was Haunted Castle directed by Georges Méliès in 1896. It is also considered as the first silent short film depicting ghost and supernatural events.

In 1926, the novel Topper by Thorne Smith was published, which created the modern American ghost. When the novel was adapted into the 1937 movie Topper, it initiated a new film genre and would also influence television. After the second World War, sentimental depictions of ghosts had become more popular in cinema than horror, and include the 1947 film The Ghost and Mrs. Muir, which was later adapted to television with a successful 1968–70 TV series. Genuine psychological horror films from this period include 1944's The Uninvited, and 1945's Dead of Night. The film Blithe Spirit, based on a play by Noël Coward, was also produced in this period. 1963 saw one of the first major adaptations of a ghost novel, The Haunting, based on the well known novel The Haunting of Hill House.

The 1970s saw screen depictions of ghosts diverge into distinct genres of the romantic and horror. A common theme in the romantic genre from this period is the ghost as a benign guide or messenger, often with unfinished business, such as 1989's Field of Dreams, the 1990 film Ghost, and the 1993 comedy Heart and Souls. In the horror genre, 1980's The Fog, and the A Nightmare on Elm Street series of films from the 1980s and 1990s are notable examples of the trend for the merging of ghost stories with scenes of physical violence. The 1990s saw a return to classic "gothic" ghosts, whose dangers were more psychological than physical. Examples of films are comedy and mystery from this period include 1984's Ghostbusters, 1999's The Sixth Sense and The Others. The 1990s also saw a lighthearted adaptation of the children's character Casper the Friendly Ghost, originally popular in cartoon form in the 1950s and early 1960s, in the feature film Casper.

Asian cinema has also produced horror films about ghosts, such as the 1998 Japanese film Ring (remade in the US as The Ring in 2002), and the Pang brothers' 2002 film The Eye. Indian ghost movies are popular not just in India, but in the Middle East, Africa, South East Asia and other parts of the world. Some Indian ghost movies such as the comedy / horror film Manichitrathazhu have been commercial successes, dubbed into several languages. Generally the films are based on the experiences of modern people who are unexpectedly exposed to ghosts, and usually draw on traditional Indian literature or folklore. In some cases the Indian films are remakes of western films, such as Anjaane, based on Alejandro Amenábar's ghost story The Others.

== Television ==
In fictional television programming, ghosts have been explored in series such as The Television Ghost, Ghost Whisperer, Medium, Supernatural, the television series adaptation of The Ghost and Mrs. Muir and Randall and Hopkirk (Deceased). In animated fictional television programming, ghosts have served as the central element in series such as Casper the Friendly Ghost, Danny Phantom, and Scooby-Doo, as well as minor roles in various other television shows.

Popularized in part by the 1984 comedy franchise Ghostbusters, ghost hunting has been popularized as a hobby wherein reportedly haunted places are explored. The ghost hunting theme has been featured in paranormal reality television series, such as A Haunting, Ghost Adventures, Ghost Hunters, Ghost Hunters International, Ghost Lab, and Most Haunted. It is also represented in children's television by such programs as The Ghost Hunter based on the book series of the same name and Ghost Trackers.

The Indian television series Aahat featured ghost and supernatural stories written by B. P. Singh. It was first aired on 5 October 1995 and ran for more than a decade, ending on 25 November 2010 with more than 450 episodes.

== See also ==
A ghost story
A narrative ghost story.

- Macabre
- Paranormal romance
- Ghost Stories (magazine)
