= Church of the Assumption, Howth =

Church in Howth, Fingal (County Dublin), Ireland

Church of the Assumption
- Church of the Assumption, Howth
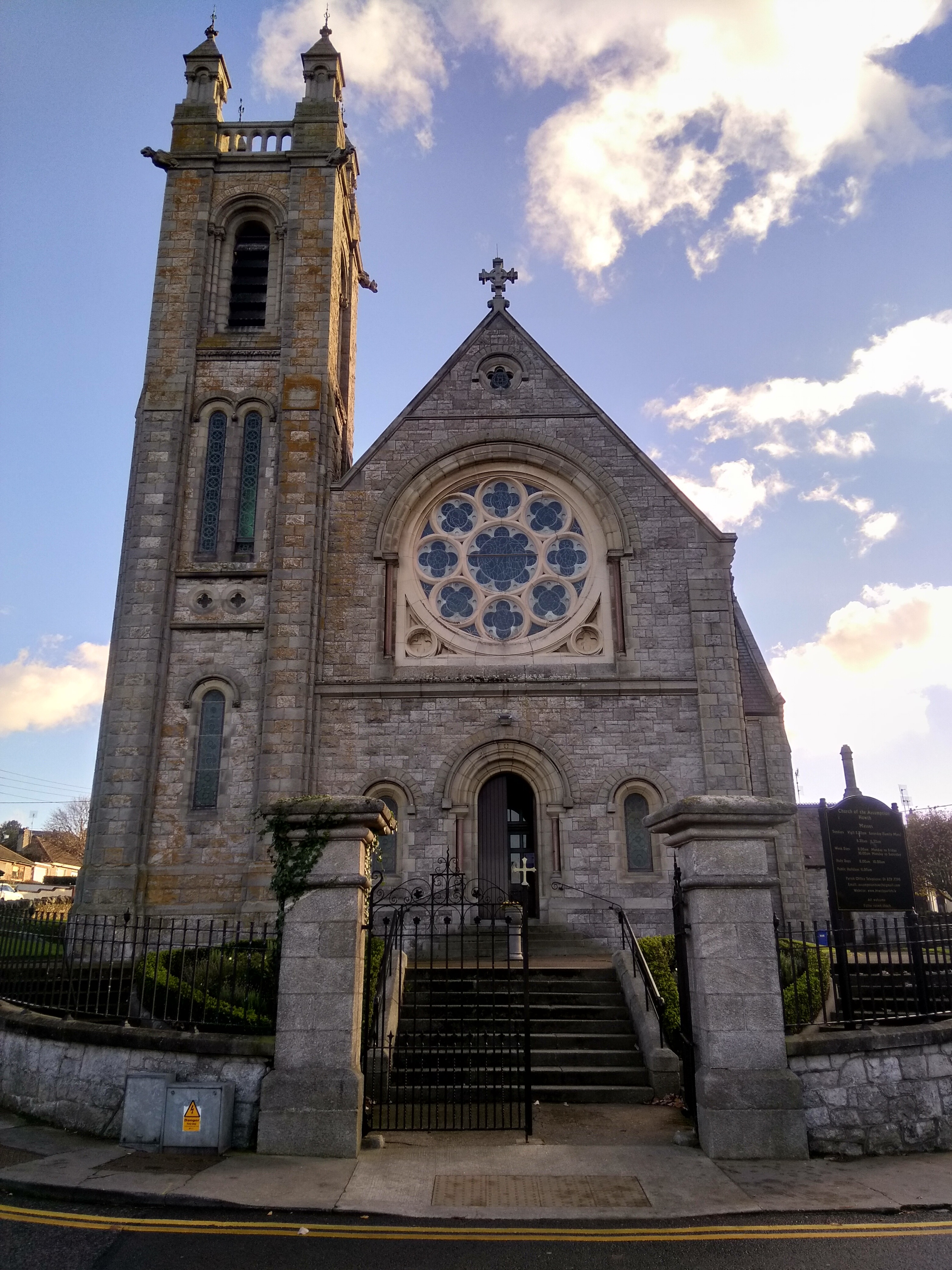
- Church of the Assumption
- 53.38475°N 6.06465°W
- Location: Howth; County Dublin
- Country: Ireland
- Denomination: Roman Catholic
- Website: howthparish.ie

History
- Dedication: Feast of the Assumption

Architecture
- Architect: William Henry Byrne

Administration
- Archdiocese: Dublin
- Deanery: Howth
- Parish: Howth

The Church of the Assumption, Howth is a Roman Catholic church in Howth, in Fingal in the traditional County Dublin.

The church is situated at the junction of Thormanby Road and Main Street, Howth, with St. Mary's Road, a short road joining the other two roads, behind. The roof is double pitched slate with decorative terracotta ridge tiles and cast iron rainwater goods. The walls are rockfaced granite with a limestone plinth, gargoyles and early Irish stone crosses.
