= Sheridan Le Fanu =

Irish writer of Gothic literature and journalist (1814–1873)

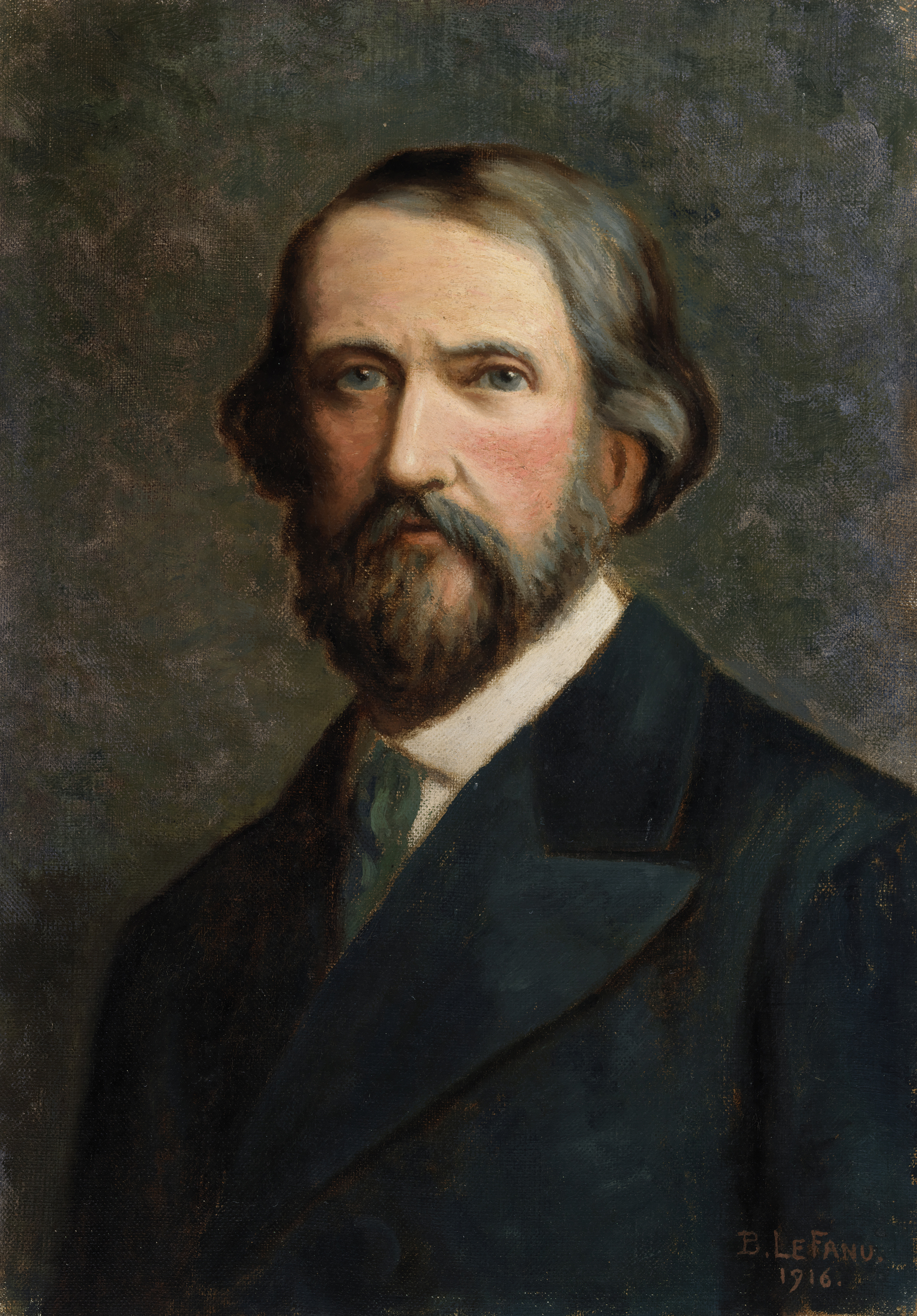
- Portrait by Brinsley Le Fanu, c. 1916
- Born: Joseph Thomas Sheridan Le Fanu; 28 August 1814; Dominick Street Lower, Dublin, Ireland
- Died: 7 February 1873 (aged 58); Dublin, Ireland
- Resting place: Mount Jerome Cemetery and Crematorium, Dublin
- Education: Trinity College Dublin (BA)
- Occupation: Writer
- Spouse: Susanna Bennett (m. 1844; died 1858)
- Children: Eleanor Le Fanu, Emma Lucretia Le Fanu, Thomas Philip Le Fanu, George Brinsley Le Fanu
- Relatives: Alicia Sheridan Le Fanu (grandmother); Richard Brinsley Sheridan (great-uncle); Nicola Le Fanu (great-great niece)
- Writing career
- Pen name: J. S. Le Fanu; Charles de Cresserons; Francis Purcell
- Language: English
- Years active: 1838–1872
- Period: Victorian era
- Genres: Gothic horror, mystery, vampire literature
- Notable works: The House by the Churchyard (1863); Uncle Silas (1864); Carmilla (1872); In a Glass Darkly (1872); The Purcell Papers (1880)
- Movement: Dark romanticism
- Website: The Le Fanu family

Joseph Thomas Sheridan Le Fanu (/ˈlɛfən.juː/; 28 August 1814 – 7 February 1873) was an Irish writer of Gothic literature, journalist and newspaper proprietor. Le Fanu is considered by literary critics to be among the greatest ghost story writers of the Victorian era, as several of his works were central to the development of the genre. He was the author of Gothic short stories and macabre poems, novels such as Uncle Silas (1864), and the collection of five stories In a Glass Darkly (1872), in which the novella Carmilla (1872) is significant as a foundational work of vampire literature.

Born into a family of writers, Le Fanu began writing poetry at the age of fifteen, using his father's personal library to educate himself. Due to severe financial constraints, his family were forced to sell the library and its books to settle some of their debts following the death of his father. In 1838, he began writing stories for the Dublin University Magazine to make money, which included his first ghost story, The Ghost and the Bone-Setter (1838). It was during this period that Le Fanu decided to focus on the ghost story genre, despite continuing to also write short stories and commentaries across other genres, and by 1840 he had become the owner of several local newspapers. Thirteen of his lesser-known Gothic short stories were published posthumously in The Purcell Papers (1880).

He also wrote The House by the Churchyard (1863), which became one of his best-known novels. Initially, his work fell into neglect following his death, and it was the efforts of later writers, such as Elizabeth Bowen and M. R. James, that brought the public's attention back to his novels. M. R. James, in particular, greatly admired his works and described Le Fanu as "absolutely in the first rank as a writer of ghost stories".

Le Fanu became a key figure in the dark romanticism movement during the 19th century, and had a major influence on later vampire and horror fictions such as Bram Stoker's Dracula (1897), among others. While several of his short stories, fictional novels, novellas, and horror pieces proved popular in his lifetime, he remains a central figure in vampire fiction largely due to the significance of Carmilla. Since his death, the novella has become one of the most influential works of vampire literature, having been adapted for films, operas, video games, Halloween plays, comics, songs, cartoons, and other media.

== Early life ==
Le Fanu was born on 28 August 1814 in Dominick Street Lower, Dublin, to Thomas Le Fanu, the curate of St Mary's, and Emma Lucretia Le Fanu (née Dobbin; died 1861). The second of three siblings of a middle-class Irish Protestant family of Huguenot descent, Le Fanu was the elder brother of the civil engineer William Richard. Both his grandmother Alicia Sheridan Le Fanu and his great-uncle Richard Brinsley Sheridan were playwrights. His mother was also a writer, producing a biography of Charles Orpen.

Within a year of his birth, his family moved to the Royal Hibernian Military School in the Phoenix Park, where his father, a Church of Ireland clergyman, was appointed to the chaplaincy of the establishment. The Phoenix Park and the adjacent village and parish church of Chapelizod would appear in Le Fanu's later stories. The folklore and landscapes that Le Fanu grew up surrounded by were a great source of inspiration for his writing, with him and his brother William becoming local authorities on the Irish countryside.

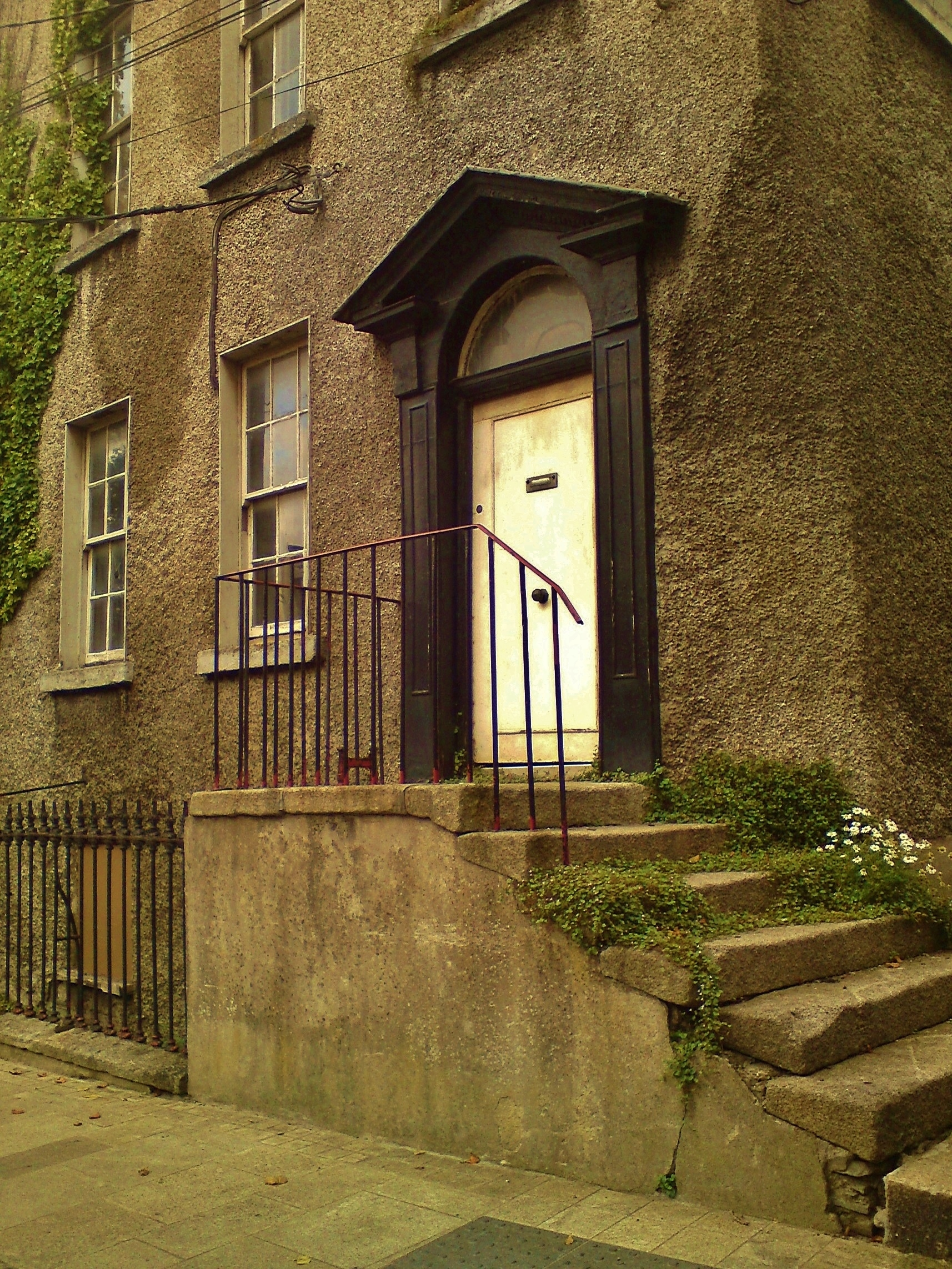
The inspiration for The House by the Churchyard: the childhood home of Sheridan Le Fanu in Chapelizod in Dublin

In 1826, the family moved to Abington, County Limerick, where Le Fanu's father Thomas took up his second rectorship in Ireland. Although he had a tutor, who, according to his brother William, taught them nothing and was finally dismissed in disgrace, Le Fanu used his father's library to educate himself. By the age of fifteen, Joseph was writing poetry which he shared with his mother and siblings but never with his father. His father was a stern Protestant churchman of the Church of Ireland.

In 1832, the disorders of the Tithe War (1831–36) affected the Abington region, reflecting the Catholic majority's resentments toward mandatory tithes for the upkeep of the Church of Ireland, which had few members. The following year the family moved back temporarily to Dublin, to Williamstown Avenue in the southern suburb of Blackrock, where Thomas was to work on a Government commission.

== Later life ==
Literary scholar Edmund Downey described Le Fanu as someone who left little behind in terms of personal writings or records, which made it difficult for biographers to create a full picture of his life outside of his published works. As such, many biographical details have had to be put together using references to him made in the writings of his contemporary family and friends, or from notes Le Fanu's son had written during his father's lifetime.

Throughout Sheridan Le Fanu's early life, his father's work as a rector and church Dean was the primary source of income for the family, by way of tithes and, eventually, government payments for clergy. On the elder Le Fanu's death in 1845, he had very little left to leave to his sons, and the family had to sell his library to pay off some of his debts. His widow went to stay with the younger son, William.

Sheridan Le Fanu studied law at Trinity College Dublin, where he was elected Auditor of the College Historical Society, and graduated in 1836. Under a system peculiar to Ireland he did not have to live in Dublin to attend lectures, but could study at home and take examinations at the university when necessary. He was called to the bar in 1839, but he never practised and soon abandoned law for journalism. In 1838 he began contributing stories to the Dublin University Magazine, including his first short story, entitled "The Ghost and the Bone-Setter" (1838), a reworking of an Irish folk tale. He became the owner of several newspapers from 1840, including the Dublin Evening Mail and the Warder.

On 18 December 1844, Le Fanu married Susan Bennett, the daughter of a leading Dublin barrister, George Bennett, and granddaughter of John Bennett, a justice of the Court of King's Bench. Susan Bennett's niece, Rhoda Broughton, would grow up to be a famed novelist in her own right. Future Home Rule League MP Isaac Butt was a witness. The couple then travelled to his parents' home in Abington for Christmas. They took a house in Warrington Place near the Grand Canal in Dublin. Their first child, Eleanor, was born in 1845, followed by Emma in 1846, Thomas in 1847 and George in 1854.

In 1847 Le Fanu supported John Mitchel and Thomas Francis Meagher in their campaign against the indifference of the government to the Irish Famine. Others involved in the campaign included Samuel Ferguson and Isaac Butt. Butt wrote a forty-page analysis of the national disaster for the Dublin University Magazine in 1847. His support cost him the nomination as Tory MP for County Carlow in 1852.

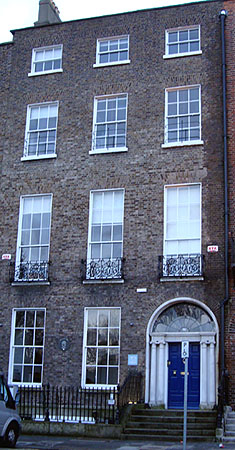
The house on Merrion Square where Le Fanu lived

Following her father's death in 1851, Susan and Joseph moved into her parent's former home in Merrion Square. This was the start of a very difficult period for the Le Fanu's as Susan mental health suffered after the death of her father. She had a crisis of faith and attended religious services at the nearby St. Stephen's Church. She also discussed religion with William, Le Fanu's younger brother, as Le Fanu had apparently stopped attending services. She suffered from anxiety after the deaths of several close relatives, including her father two years before, which may have led to marital problems.

In April 1858, she suffered an "hysterical attack" and died the following day in unclear circumstances. She was buried in the Bennett family vault in Mount Jerome Cemetery beside her father and brothers. The anguish of Le Fanu's diaries suggests that he felt guilt as well as loss. He removed himself from the public eye following this loss, earning the moniker "The Invisible Prince". He did not publish any fiction until the death of his mother in 1861. He turned to his cousin Lady Gifford for advice and encouragement, and she remained a close correspondent until her death at the end of the decade.

In 1861, Le Fanu became the editor and proprietor of the Dublin University Magazine, and he began to take advantage of double publication, first serialising in the Dublin University Magazine, then revising for the English market. He published both The House by the Churchyard and Wylder's Hand in this way. After lukewarm reviews of the former novel, set in the Phoenix Park area of Dublin, Le Fanu signed a contract with Richard Bentley, his London publisher, which specified that future novels be stories "of an English subject and of modern times", a step Bentley thought necessary for Le Fanu to satisfy the English audience. Le Fanu succeeded in this aim in 1864, with the publication of Uncle Silas, which he set in Derbyshire. In his last short stories, however, Le Fanu returned to Irish folklore as an inspiration and encouraged his friend Patrick Kennedy to contribute folklore to the D.U.M.

== Death ==
Le Fanu died in Dublin on 7 February 1873, at the age of 58. The circumstances surrounding his death have been described as "legendary", with his cause of death being highly contested. According to his daughter Emma Lucretia, he died peacefully at home after falling ill with bronchitis. However, a later account from S. M. Ellis suggests a more fragile state of mind, remembering that Le Fanu was afflicted with disturbing dreams during his final days. Russell Kirk instead wrote in his essay "A Cautionary Note on the Ghostly Tale" in The Surly Sullen Bell that Le Fanu "is believed to have literally died of fright", although Kirk does not elaborate on the circumstances.

There is a road and a park in Ballyfermot, near his childhood home in southwest Dublin, named after him.

== Work ==
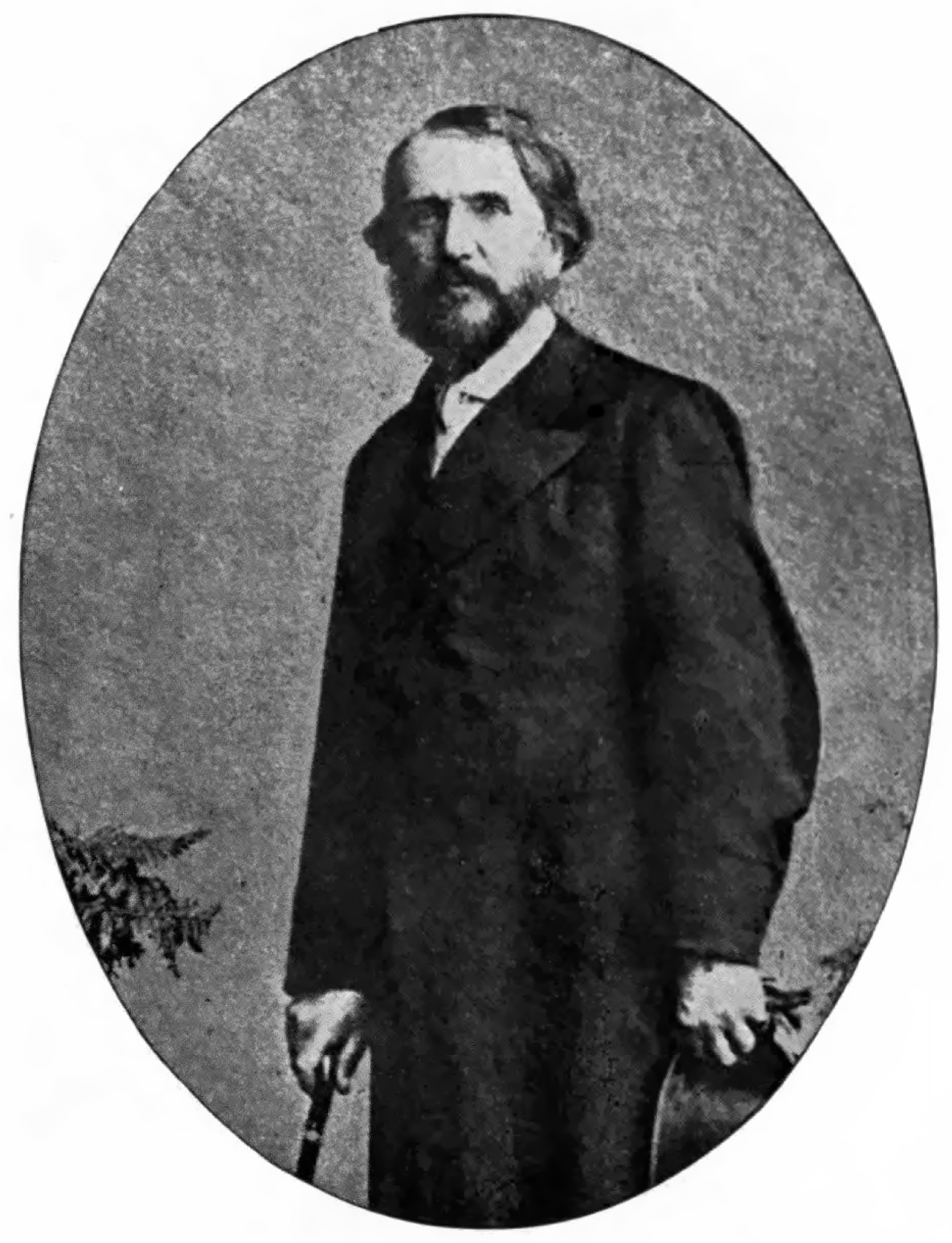
Le Fanu c. 1870

Le Fanu worked in many genres but remains best known for his horror fiction. He was a meticulous craftsman and frequently reworked plots and ideas from his earlier writing in subsequent pieces. Many of his novels, for example, are expansions and refinements of earlier short stories. He specialised in tone and effect rather than "shock horror" and liked to leave important details unexplained and mysterious. He avoided overt supernatural effects: in most of his major works, the supernatural is strongly implied but a "natural" explanation is also possible.

The demonic monkey in "Green Tea" could be a delusion of the story's protagonist, who is the only person to see it; in "The Familiar", Captain Barton's death seems to be supernatural but is not actually witnessed, and the ghostly owl may be a real bird. This technique influenced later horror artists, both in print and on film (see, for example, the film producer Val Lewton's principle of "indirect horror").

Though other writers have since chosen less subtle techniques, Le Fanu's finest tales, such as the vampire novella Carmilla and the short story "Schalken the Painter", remain some of the most powerful in the genre. He had an enormous influence on one of the 20th century's most important ghost story writers, M. R. James, and although his work fell out of favour in the early part of the 20th century, towards the end of the century interest in his work increased and remains comparatively strong.

=== The Purcell Papers ===
His earliest twelve short stories, written between 1838 and 1840, purport to be the literary remains of an 18th-century Catholic priest called Father Purcell. They were published in the Dublin University Magazine and were later collected as The Purcell Papers (1880). They are mostly set in Ireland, and are characterized as ranging from the genuinely spooky to spoofing the spooky. Oher themes include historical romance centering on the deposed Catholic aristocracy of Ireland. Some of the stories still often appear in anthologies:

1. The Ghost and the Bonesetter (January 1838), his first-published, jocular story
2. The Fortunes of Sir Robert Ardagh (March 1838), an enigmatic story which partially involves a Faustian pact and is set in the Gothic ambiance of a castle in rural Ireland
3. The Last Heir of Castle Connor (June 1838), a non-supernatural tale, exploring the decline and expropriation of the ancient Catholic gentry of Ireland under the Protestant Ascendancy
4. The Drunkard's Dream (August 1838), a haunting vision of Hell
5. Passage in the Secret History of an Irish Countess (November 1838), an early version of his later novel Uncle Silas
6. The Bridal of Carrigvarah (April 1839)
7. Strange Event in the Life of Schalken [sic] the Painter (May 1839), a disturbing version of the demon lover motif. This tale was inspired by the atmospheric candlelit scenes of the 17th-century Dutch painter Godfried Schalcken, who is the model for the story's protagonist. M. R. James stated that "'Schalken' conforms more strictly to my own ideals. It is indeed one of the best of Le Fanu's good things." It was adapted and broadcast for television as Schalcken the Painter by the BBC for Christmas 1979, starring Jeremy Clyde and John Justin.
8. Scraps of Hibernian Ballads (June 1839)
9. Jim Sulivan's Adventures in the Great Snow (July 1839)
10. A Chapter in the History of a Tyrone Family (October 1839), which may have influenced Charlotte Brontë's Jane Eyre. This story was later reworked and expanded by Le Fanu as The Wyvern Mystery (1869).
11. An Adventure of Hardress Fitzgerald, a Royalist Captain (February 1840)
12. The Quare Gander (October 1840)

Revised versions of Irish Countess (as The Murdered Cousin) and Schalken were reprinted in Le Fanu's first collection of short stories, titled Ghost Stories and Tales of Mystery (1851).

=== Spalatro ===
An anonymous novella Spalatro: From the Notes of Fra Giacomo, published in the Dublin University Magazine in 1843, was added to the Le Fanu canon as late as 1980, being recognised as Le Fanu's work by W. J. McCormack in his biography of that year. Spalatro has a typically Gothic Italian setting, featuring a bandit as the hero, as in Ann Radcliffe (whose 1797 novel The Italian includes a repentant minor villain of the same name).

More disturbing, however, is the hero Spalatro's necrophiliac passion for an undead blood-drinking beauty, who seems to be a predecessor of Le Fanu's later female vampire Carmilla. Like Carmilla, this undead femme fatale is not portrayed in an entirely negative way and attempts, but fails, to save the hero Spalatro from the eternal damnation that seems to be his destiny.

Le Fanu wrote this story after the death of his elder sister Catherine in March 1841. She had been ailing for about ten years, but her death came as a great shock to him.

=== Historical fiction ===
Le Fanu's first novels were historical, à la Sir Walter Scott, though with an Irish setting. Like Scott, Le Fanu was sympathetic to the old Jacobite cause:

- The Cock and Anchor (1845), a story of old Dublin. It was reissued with slight alterations as Morley Court in 1873.
- The Fortunes of Colonel Torlogh O'Brien (1847)
- The House by the Churchyard (1863), the last of Le Fanu's novels to be set in the past and, as mentioned above, the last with an Irish setting. It is noteworthy that here Le Fanu's historical style is blended with his later Gothic style, influenced by his reading of the classic writers of that genre, such as Ann Radcliffe. This novel, later cited by James Joyce in Finnegans Wake, is set in Chapelizod, where Le Fanu lived in his youth.

=== Sensation novels ===
Le Fanu published many novels in the contemporary sensation fiction style of Wilkie Collins and others:

- Wylder's Hand (1864)
- Guy Deverell (1865)
- All in the Dark (1866), satirising spiritualism
- The Tenants of Malory (1867)
- A Lost Name (1868), an adaptation of The Evil Guest
- Haunted Lives (1868)
- The Wyvern Mystery (1869), which formed the basis of a BBC TV miniseries in 2000
- Checkmate (1871)
- The Rose and the Key (1871), which describes the horrors of the private lunatic asylum, a classic Gothic theme
- Willing to Die (1872)

=== Major works ===
Le Fanu's best-known works, still widely read today, are:

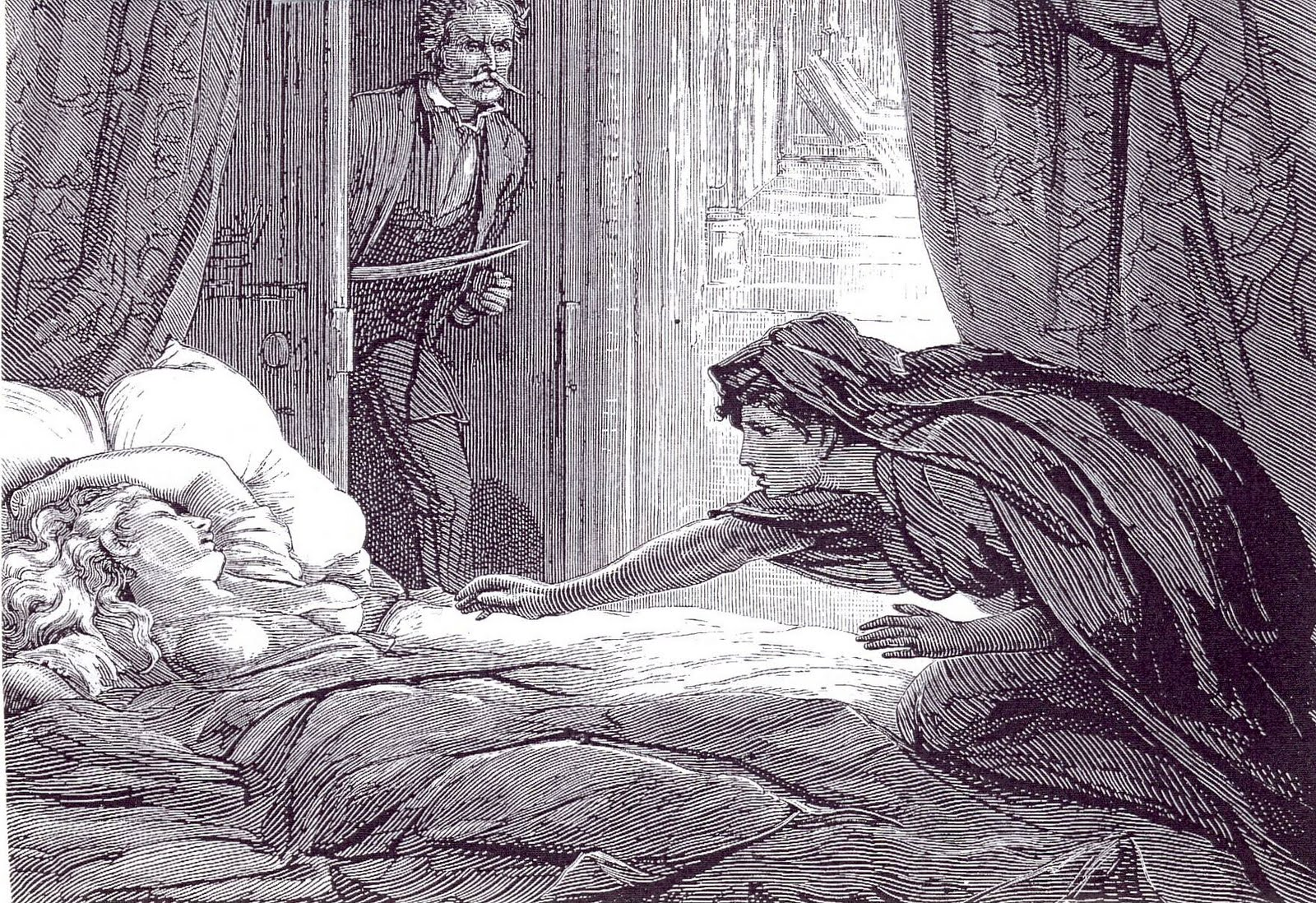
The seductive vampire Carmilla attacks the sleeping Bertha Rheinfeldt.

- Uncle Silas (1864), a macabre mystery novel and classic of gothic horror. It is a much-extended adaptation of his earlier short story "Passage in the Secret History of an Irish Countess", with the setting changed from Ireland to England. A film version under the same name was made by Gainsborough Studios in 1947, and a remake entitled The Dark Angel, starring Peter O'Toole as the title character, was made in 1989.
- In a Glass Darkly (1872), a collection of five short stories in the horror and mystery genres, presented as the posthumous papers of the occult detective Dr Hesselius:

- Green Tea, a haunting narrative of a man plagued by a demonic monkey.
- The Familiar, a slightly revised version of Le Fanu's 1847 tale The Watcher. M. R. James considered this to be the best ghost story ever written.
- Mr Justice Harbottle, another panorama of hell and much loved by M. R. James.
- The Room in the Dragon Volant, not a ghost story but a notable mystery story that includes the theme of premature burial.
- Carmilla, a compelling tale of a female vampire, set in central Europe. It has inspired several films, including Hammer's The Vampire Lovers (1970), Roger Vadim's Blood and Roses (1960), and Danish director Carl Theodor Dreyer's Vampyr (1932), as well as the character of Van Helsing in Bram Stoker's novel Dracula. Scholars like A. Asbjørn Jøn have also noted the important place that Carmilla holds in shifting the portrayal of vampires in modern fiction.

=== Other short-story collections ===
- Chronicles of Golden Friars (1871), a collection of three novellas set in the imaginary English village of Golden Friars:

- A Strange Adventure in the Life of Miss Laura Mildmay, incorporating the story Madam Crowl's Ghost
- The Haunted Baronet
- The Bird of Passage

- The Watcher and Other Weird Stories (1894), a posthumous collection of short stories; all but The Watcher were reprinted from The Purcell Papers:

- The Watcher
- Passage in the Secret History of an Irish Countess
- Strange Event in the Life of Schalken the Painter
- The Fortunes of Sir Robert Ardagh
- The Dream (from The Drunkard's Dream)
- A Chapter in the History of a Tyrone Family

- Madam Crowl's Ghost and Other Tales of Mystery (1923), uncollected short stories gathered from their original magazine publications and edited by M. R. James:

- Madam Crowl's Ghost (from All the Year Round), December 1870
- Squire Toby's Will, from Temple Bar, January 1868
- Dickon the Devil, from London Society, Christmas Number, 1872
- The Child That Went with the Fairies, from All the Year Round, February 1870
- The White Cat of Drumgunniol, from All the Year Round, April 1870
- An Account of Some Strange Disturbances in Aungier Street, from the Dublin University Magazine, January 1851
- Ghost Stories of Chapelizod, from the Dublin University Magazine, January 1851
- Wicked Captain Walshawe, of Wauling, from the Dublin University Magazine, April 1864
- Sir Dominick's Bargain, from All the Year Round, July 1872
- Ultor de Lacy, from the Dublin University Magazine, December 1861
- The Vision of Tom Chuff, from All the Year Round, October 1870
- Stories of Lough Guir, from All the Year Round, April 1870

The publication of this book, which has often been reprinted, led to the revival in interest in Le Fanu, which has continued to this day.

== Legacy and influence ==
Le Fanu is considered by many to be one of the foremost ghost story writers of the Victorian era, and Carmilla remains hugely popular in vampire fiction. In addition to M. R. James, several other writers have expressed strong admiration for Le Fanu's fiction. E. F. Benson stated that Le Fanu's stories "Green Tea", "The Familiar", and "Mr. Justice Harbottle" are "instinct with an awfulness which custom cannot stale, and this quality is due, as in The Turn of the Screw [by Henry James], to Le Fanu's admirably artistic methods in setting and narration". Benson added, "[Le Fanu's] best work is of the first rank, while as a 'flesh-creeper' he is unrivalled. No one else has so sure a touch in mixing the mysterious atmosphere in which horror darkly breeds."

Jack Sullivan has asserted that Le Fanu is "one of the most important and innovative figures in the development of the ghost story" and that Le Fanu's work has had "an incredible influence on the genre; [he is] regarded by M. R. James, E. F. Bleiler, and others as the most skilful writer of supernatural fiction in English."

Le Fanu's work influenced several later writers. Most famously, Carmilla influenced Bram Stoker in the writing of Dracula. M. R. James' ghost fiction was influenced by Le Fanu's work in the genre. Oliver Onions's supernatural novel The Hand of Kornelius Voyt (1939) was inspired by Le Fanu's Uncle Silas. His works had fallen into obscurity following his death, and it was the efforts of later horror writers, among them Elizabeth Bowen and M. R. James, that put the spotlight back on his writings.

== See also ==
- List of horror fiction writers
