= The House by the Churchyard =

1863 novel by Joseph Sheridan Le Fanu

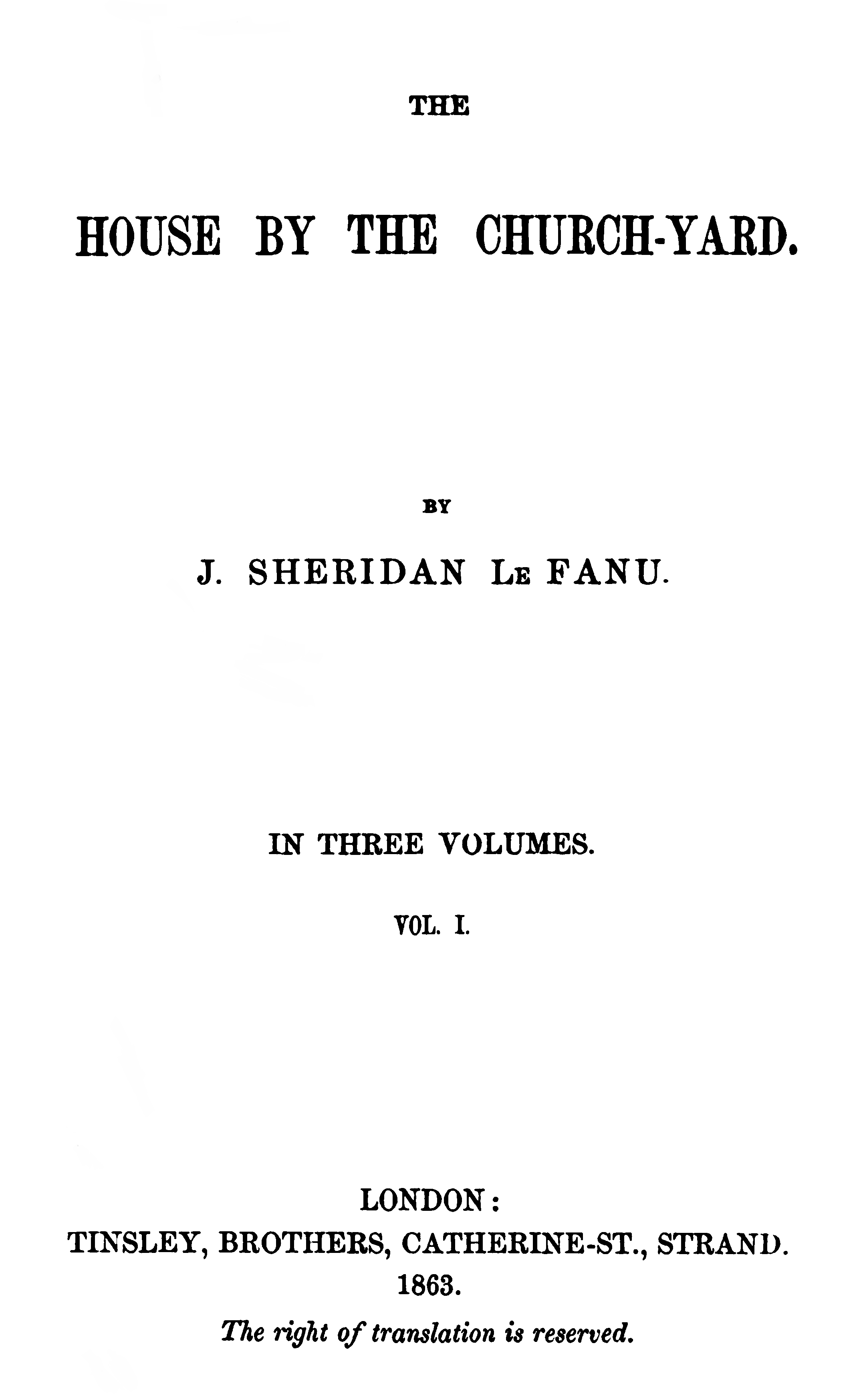
- First Edition title page (1863)
- Author: Joseph Sheridan Le Fanu
- Language: English
- Genre: Gothic fiction, psychological horror, suspense, mystery
- Publisher: William Tinsley
- Publication date: 1863
- Publication place: Ireland
- Pages: 560

The House by the Churchyard is an 1863 novel by the Irish writer Sheridan Le Fanu that combines elements of the mystery novel and the historical novel. Le Fanu uses the Gothic fiction plot to explore various themes related to death, suspense, mystery, the supernatural, and the darker aspects of human actions against the backdrop of 18th-century Irish village life. The work is one of Le Fanu's most popular novels, and was first published in London by William Tinsley.

The story revolves around a series of interconnected crimes, disappearances and murders, both in the past and the present, that disrupt the seemingly peaceful Irish rural life. A newly unearthed human skull with unusual injuries sparks both intrigue and investigation, bringing in supporting characters like the mysterious Barnaby Sturk and the young medical student Charles Wilder. The protagonist is Mervyn, whose father was unjustly convicted of murder, and he returns to Chapelizod seeking to clear his family's name and uncover the truth behind the unsolved crimes. The novel is also noted for its vivid and detailed descriptions of the Irish countryside and its villages, creating a haunting setting for the plot. The setting of the novel involves an actual real-life building, located in Chapelizod village. Although it has undergone many rounds of renovations, the overall appearance of the building remains similar to what it was during the late 19th century, when the novel was written.

The work inspired several later Irish writers, including James Joyce, M. R. James, and Bram Stoker, who drew upon its Gothic horror and suspense features for their own novels. It has been considered by many critics as a precursor to the psychological horror genre, and although it is credited with influencing the genre significantly, there have been no adaptations of the novel to date.

== Plot summary ==
The novel begins with a prologue in the voice of an old man, Charles de Cresseron, that is set in Chapelizod, Ireland, roughly a century after the events of the novel proper. This prologue details how, during an interment at the churchyard of the title, a skull is accidentally unearthed, which bears the marks of two crushing blows to the head and – even more disconcertingly – a small hole from a trepanning. The novel itself is Cresseron's reconstruction of the history related to this grisly item (though by and large his narratorial voice drops out and the novel is told from a conventional omniscient narrator's point of view).

The first chapter of the novel proper moves back to 1767, the period of the novel, and begins with another mysterious occurrence in the churchyard: the secretive burial of a coffin, with the occupant simply identified on the brass plaque as "R.D." But after this ominous opening the book turns (in its first half) to the careful and largely light-hearted elaboration of the social life and intrigues among the denizens of Chapelizod, from the powerful Lord Castlemallard to the soldiers in the local barracks under General Chattesworth, to the good Doctor Walsingham and his daughter Lily, to the gluttonous local Catholic priest Father Roach. The opening section of the novel is largely taken up by a farcical duel between two characters, Nutter and O'Flaherty, which arises from drunken misunderstanding and eventually is defused without any harm done. Le Fanu introduces hints of unease, though, with the advent of the mysterious Mr Mervyn, who takes up residence in the Tiled House, a building widely rumoured to be haunted. (At this point, Le Fanu interpolates a ghost story, "An Authentic Narrative of the Ghost of a Hand", which has often been separately anthologized.) Mervyn courts the daughter of the General, Gertrude Chattesworth, but has a rival in the scheming Mr Dangerfield, the trusted manager of the English estates of Lord Castlemallard who is visiting Chapelizod and who also has his eye on Gertrude. Dangerfield destroys the romance between Mervyn and Gertrude by setting into circulation vicious rumours about him and his family. Mervyn is in fact the son and heir of the late Lord Dunoran, who was found guilty of murdering a man named Beauclerc to whom he had lost a considerable sum at cards; Dunoran then committed suicide in his prison cell. (It was his coffin that was buried at the beginning of the book – the secrecy required because of the dubiousness of burying a suicide on consecrated ground.)

The centre of the novel is the dark web of intrigue surrounding Doctor Sturk, the military doctor (who is on the brink of bankruptcy) and Charles Nutter, the local agent for Lord Castlemallard, whom Sturk both hates and envies. Sturk is troubled by vague recollections about Dangerfield, and gradually realizes that he is in fact the wily and dangerous Charles Archer, who actually committed the murder of Beauclerc. (The only other person who knows about the identity of Charles Archer is Mr Irons, the church clerk, who was originally his accomplice.) Foolishly, Sturk tries to blackmail Dangerfield, and is later discovered in Phoenix Park with his head clubbed in. Sturk survives the attack but is left in a coma.

Confusing matters, however, is the simultaneous disappearance under a cloud of Nutter, who is being tormented by Mary Matchwell/Mary Duncan, a professional con artist and schemer who infiltrates the Nutter household by offering to tell Mrs Nutter's fortune. Mrs Matchwell accuses Nutter of bigamy, having married her long ago; he sets off to attempt to prove that she herself was already married at the time and that her husband is still living. Unfortunately, he ends up in the Park just at the time of Sturk's meeting with Dangerfield, and when he hears the sounds of the attack he runs to the scene; his footprints are thus later found at the scene of the crime and he becomes a suspect. Nutter disappears (after anonymously reporting the crime) and for a long time is assumed to have committed suicide, especially after a body is pulled from the river; but he is eventually discovered and put in jail, pending trial for the attack on Sturk.

At this point Dangerfield, who has befriended Mrs Sturk, decides to try to ensure Sturk's death (and perpetual silence) by having him trepanned, which he has been assured by medical experts is guaranteed to kill him. However, he is unfortunate enough to secure the services of "Black Dillon", a debt-ridden, alcoholic doctor from Dublin who is, however, an unusually capable surgeon. When Dillon is several hours late for the appointment at Sturk's house, Dangerfield gives up and leaves, but Dillon arrives and (in the absence of Dangerfield, and much to everybody's surprise) manages to succeed in the operation. Sturk dictates a deathbed account of Dangerfield's attack on him and the murder of Beauclerc; Irons, discovering that the game is up, adds his own story to the record. Shortly thereafter Sturk dies at last.

Dangerfield is apprehended after a violent scuffle with the authorities, and in the subsequent trial is found guilty. He contrives to avoid hanging by a strange stratagem: he seals off the ventilation in his cell and uses the charcoal brazier that is his bed-warmer to suffocate himself. Before his death he gives a full confession of his deeds to Mervyn (now acknowledged as Lord Dunoran).

Aside from the main outline of the suspense plot, there are countless other characters and subplots. Most of these are comical, such as Captain Cluffe's attempt to woo the elderly (and rich) Rebecca Chattesworth. There is one serious subplot: the ill-starred romance between the alcoholic but romantic rake Captain Devereux and the virtuous Lily Walsingham. Their romance is scuppered when he is accused of "ruining" a young girl and having promised to marry her (he denies the latter, at least). Lily turns down Devereux's offer of marriage, and eventually pines away and dies. Devereux makes attempts to reform himself, but it is too late.

The novel has influenced many later Irish authors since its publication. It has been considered by many critics as a precursor to the psychological horror genre, although there have been no adaptations for it till date.

== Building ==
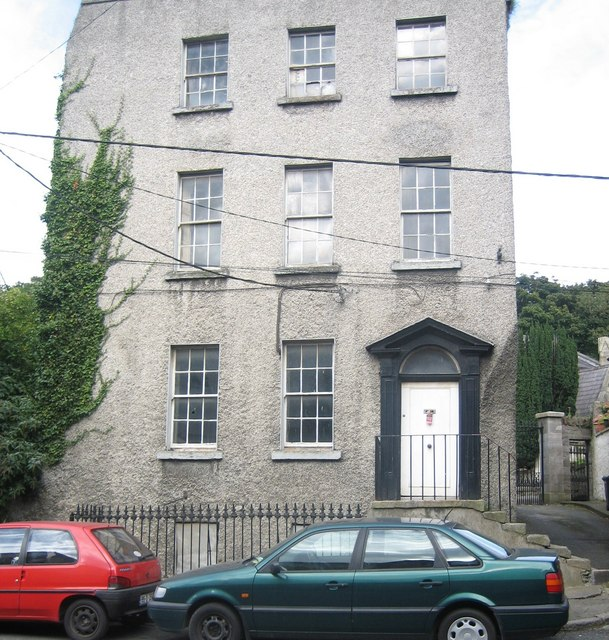
The House by the Churchyard at 34 Main Street, Chapelizod in 2007. The house was built around 1740.

The building, which was reputedly used as the basis for the titular house referred to in the book, is number 34 Main Street in Chapelizod village. While some restoration works were reputedly undertaken on the house in early 2021, the building was listed by An Taisce on its list of 'Top 10 Most-at-Risk' buildings nationally published in late 2021.
