= The Purcell Papers =

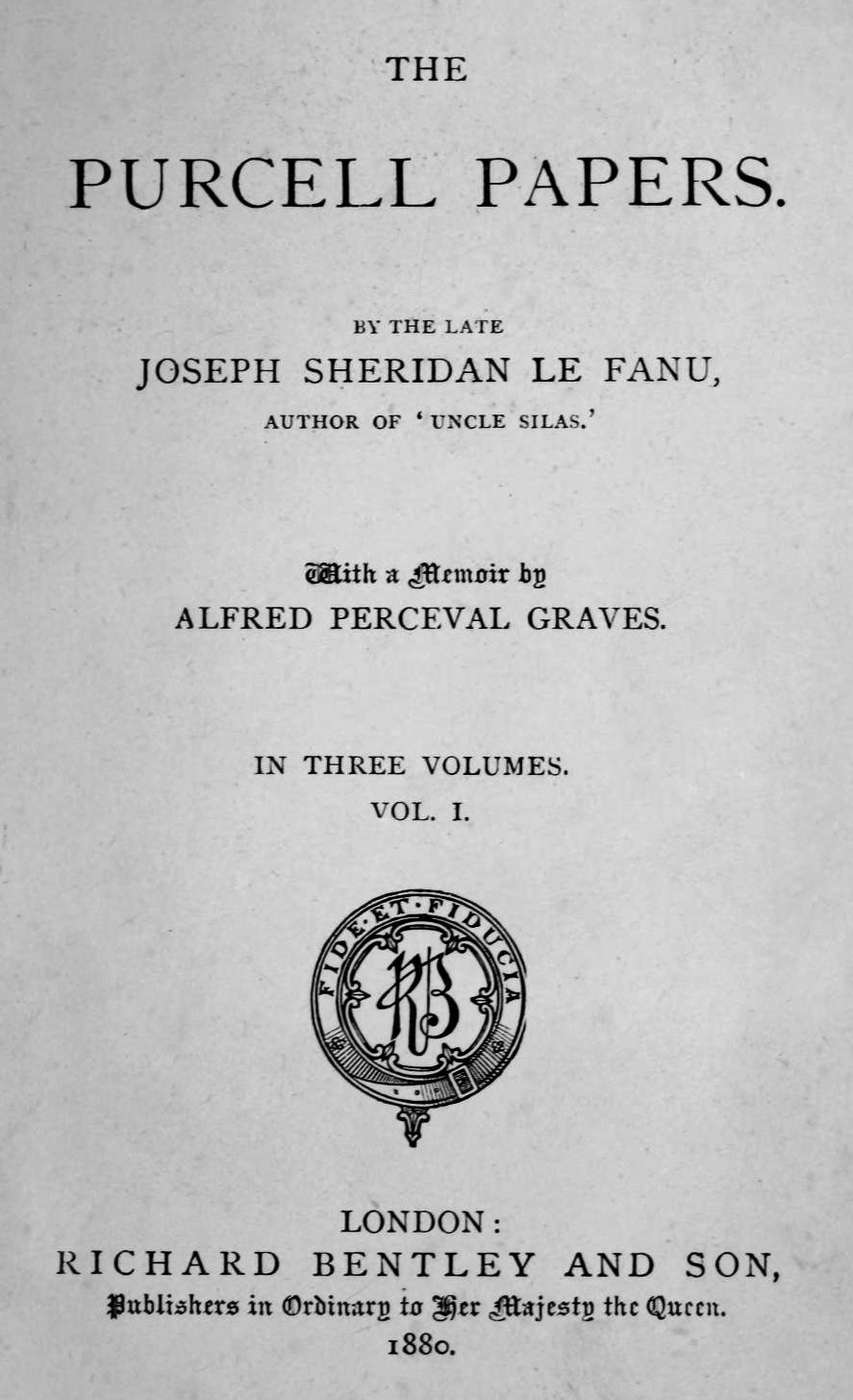
- First edition title page
- Author: Joseph Sheridan Le Fanu
- Publisher: Richard Bentley
- Publication date: 1880

The Purcell Papers (1880) are a collection of thirteen Gothic, supernatural, historical and humorous short stories by Joseph Sheridan Le Fanu (1814–73) originally written for the Dublin University Magazine. The first twelve were written between 1838–40 and purport to be extracts from the 'MS. Papers of the late Rev. Francis Purcell, of Drumcoolagh', a Catholic priest. The thirteenth and last tale on the collection, Billy Maloney's Taste of Love and Glory dates from 1850 and is not connected with Father Purcell. The tales comprise:

Vol 1

- The Ghost and the Bone-Setter (first published January 1838)
- The Fortunes of Sir Robert Ardagh (March 1838)
- The Last Heir of Castle Connor (June 1838)
- The Drunkard's Dream (August 1838)

Vol 2

- Passage in the Secret History of an Irish Countess (November 1838)
- The Bridal of Carrigvarah (April 1839)
- Strange Event in the Life of Schalken the Painter (May 1839)
- Scraps of Hibernian Ballads (June 1839)

Vol 3

- Jim Sulivan's Adventures in the Great Snow (July 1839)
- A Chapter in the History of a Tyrone Family (October 1839)
- An Adventure of Hardress Fitzgerald, a Royalist Captain (February 1840)
- The Quare Gander (October 1840)
- Billy Maloney's Taste of Love and Glory (June 1850)

== See also ==
- Ghost stories
