= George's Street Arcade =

Small historic shopping facility in central Dublin

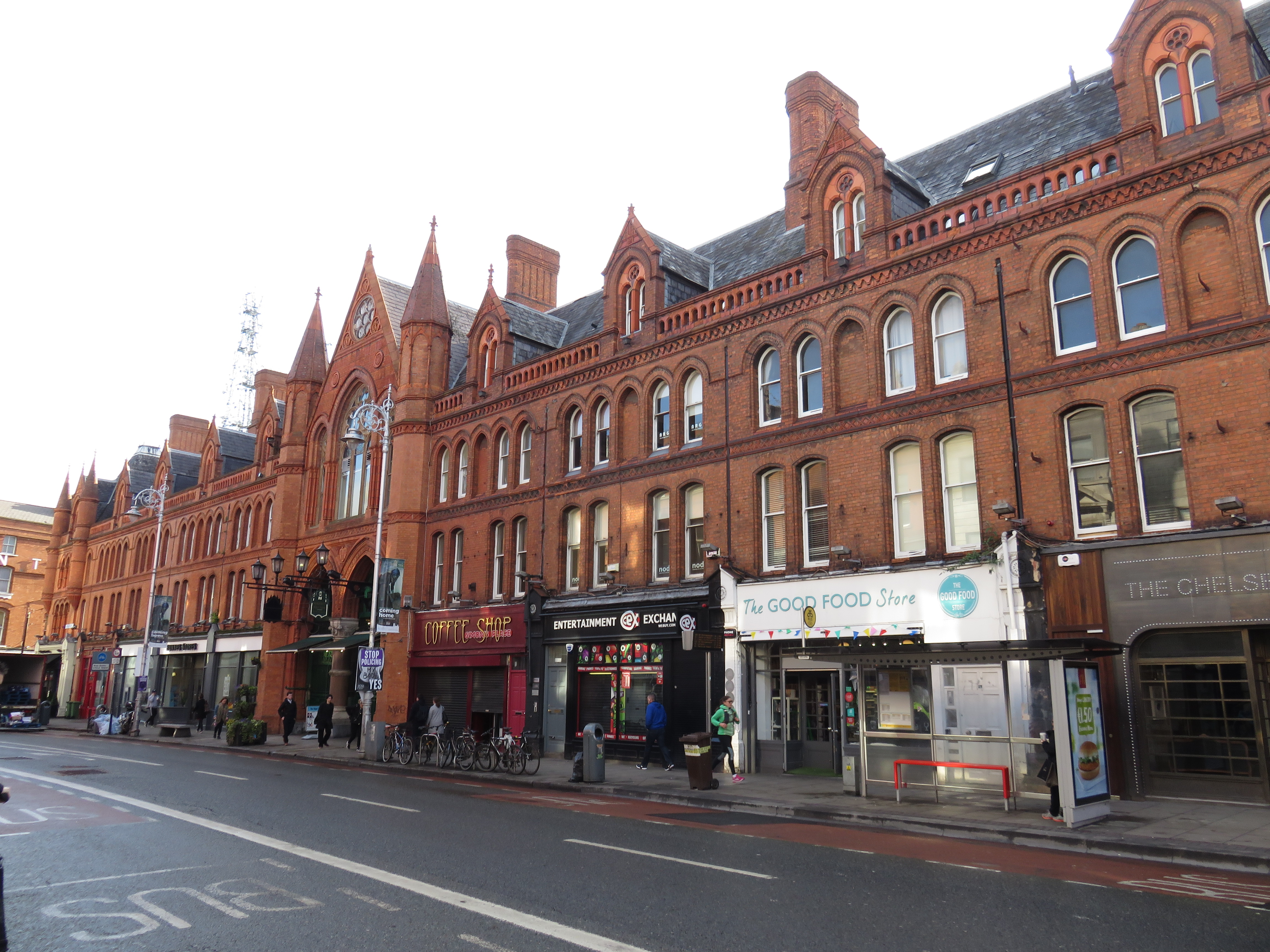
- George's Street Arcade exterior and entrance in 2018

- Location within Central Dublin
- Former names: South City Markets

General information
- Type: Indoor market / Shopping centre
- Architectural style: Victorian architecture
- Location: South Great George's Street, Dublin 2, Ireland
- Coordinates: 53.342618°N 6.264347°W
- Construction started: 1876; 150 years ago
- Inaugurated: 1881; 145 years ago
- Cost: 250,000 pounds sterling
- Owner: Layden Family Group

Design and construction
- Architecture firm: Lockwood & Mauson

Website
- www.georgesstreetarcade.ie

George's Street Arcade is a shopping centre on South Great George's Street in Dublin. It is a Victorian style red-bricked indoor market of stalls and stores. It opened in 1881 as the South City Markets.

== History ==
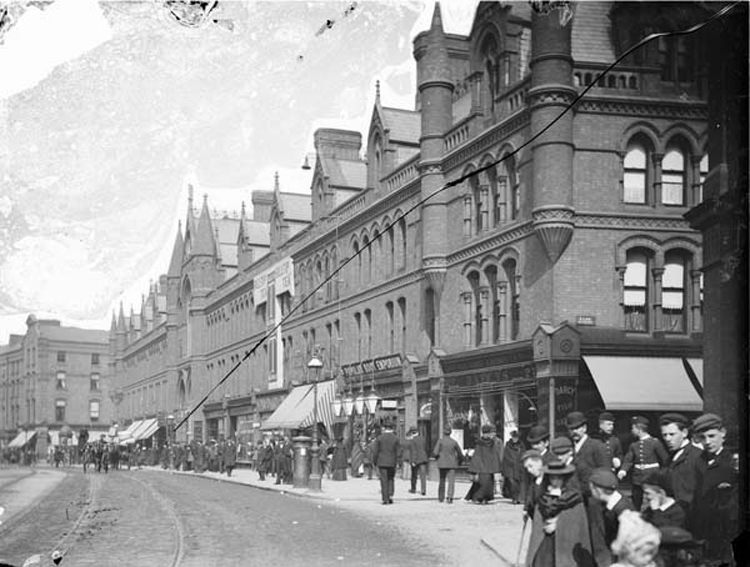
South City Market, George's Street, Dublin, 1897

The first purpose-built Victorian Shopping Centre in Dublin was South City Markets, commonly known now as George's Street Arcade. The City Market Company was incorporated in Dublin with a share capital of £200,000 and a loan capital of £50,000, for the establishment, maintenance and regulation of a market on the south side of the city in 1876. In order for the company to require the land necessary to develop the markets, an act of parliament was needed and acquired; this gave the company not only the power to acquire the lands but also the responsibility to widen and generally improve the surrounding streets. Noted British architects Lockwood & Mauson won the contract to design and build the market complex. In 1881, South City Markets was officially opened by the Lord Mayor Sir George Moyers after the development was heavily promoted by wealthy families with substantial property interests in the area. The opening was a grand occasion and was well attended by the invited guests who were entertained to luncheon by the market chairman Joseph Tod Hunter Pim. Notably, there were no native Dubliners on the guest list; this was received poorly by locals.

== 1892 Fire ==
Due in some part to the appointment of English builders and architects, the market was not initially popular with ordinary Dubliners. Tragedy struck the markets in August 1892 when the building was destroyed by fire. There were no fatalities, but this was devastating for all concerned with the shopkeepers losing their shops and overhead homes. However, the stall holders were hit worse because many had no insurance on their stock. Some of the original letters from the stall holders to the management detailing their losses still exist. After a flood of public sympathy, a relief fund was successfully established for the affected shop owners.

== Rebuilt ==
The markets were rebuilt in the same style with a remodelled interior designed by William Henry Byrne, this time using local labour and craftsmen. On 13 September 1894, they were open once again for business. On this occasion, all local dignitaries of any standing were invited to the opening and the George's Street Arcade has traded continually since then.

== Arcade today ==
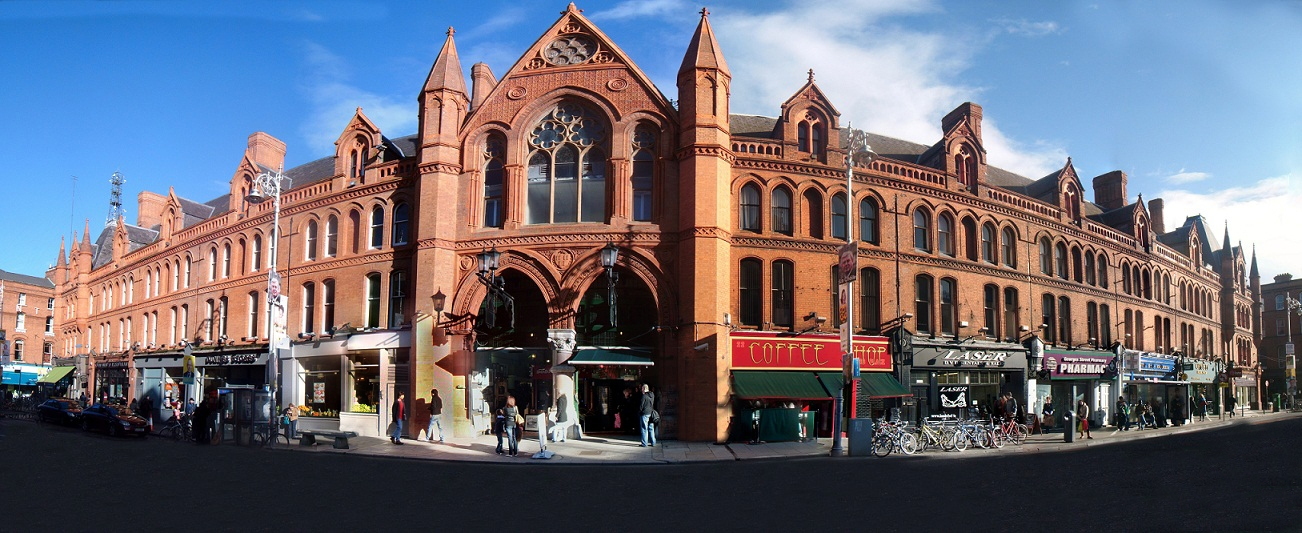
George's Street Arcade Dublin, a panoramic view

The property was acquired in 1992 by the current owners, the Layden Family Group from City Properties.
