= Church of Saint John the Evangelist, Kilkenny =

St. John's Church
- Church of Saint John the Evangelist
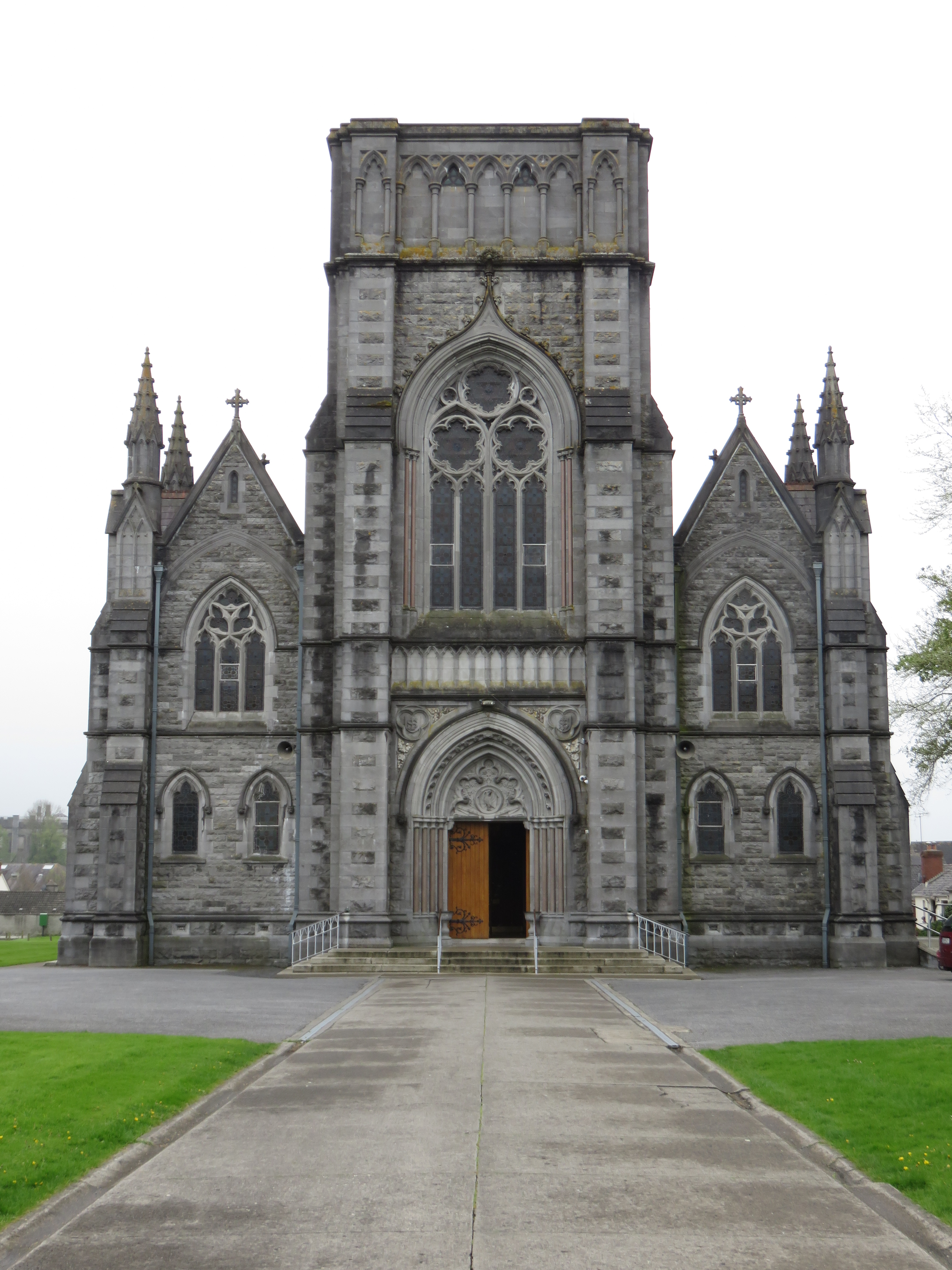
- St. John's Church
- 52°39′15″N 7°14′46″W
- Location: County Kilkenny
- Country: Ireland
- Denomination: Roman Catholic

History
- Former name: O'Loughlin Memorial Church
- Founded: 1903; 123 years ago
- Founder: O'Loughlin Family

Architecture
- Completed: 1908; 118 years ago

Administration
- Diocese: Diocese of Ossory

The Church of Saint John the Evangelist, or John's Church, is a Gothic Revival style church in Kilkenny, Ireland. The Church was designed by William Hague and built from 1903 to 1908 on the site of an earlier church located in the graveyard. The grounds contain trees and greenery.

== History ==
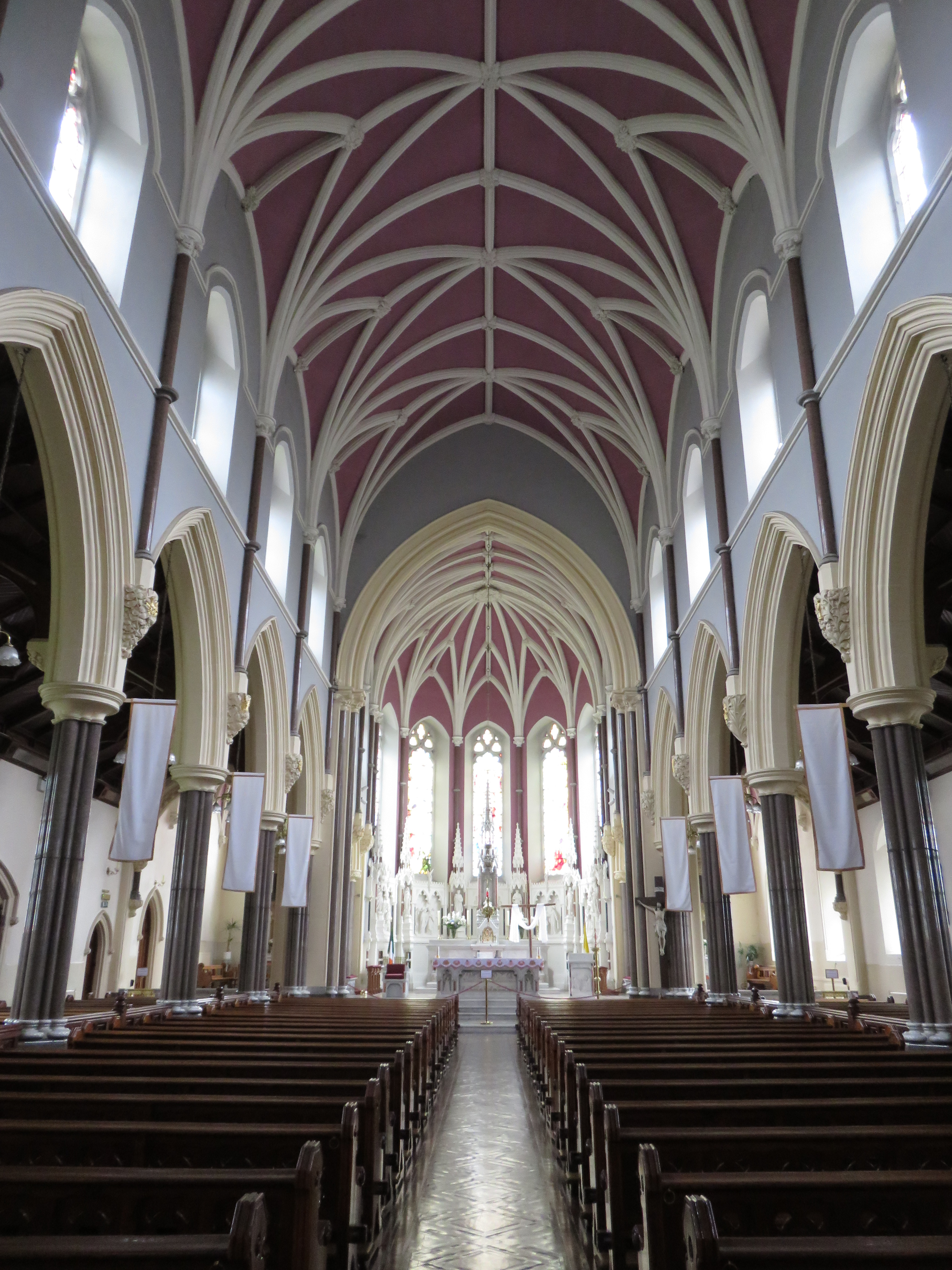
Interior of the church

It was built as the O'Loughlin Memorial Church by the O'Loughlin family of Sandford's Court. The site was donated by James Butler, the third Marquess of Ormonde. It was built to designs by William Hague (c.1840-99), under the supervision of William Henry Byrne (1866–1917).

== Architecture ==
The lack of ornamentation to the summit indicates that the additional stage and spire projected by Byrne in association with William Hogan was never executed.
