= William Henry Byrne =

Irish architect

- Born: May 17, 1844
- Died: April 28, 1917 (aged 72)
- Occupation: Architect

William Henry Byrne (17 May 1844 – 28 April 1917) was an Irish architect who mainly designed churches. He studied under James Joseph McCarthy before going into business with John O’Neill in 1869. He worked on his own after O'Neill's death in 1883. In 1902, he took his son Ralph Henry Byrne into partnership, operating as "W.H. Byrne & Son".

== Designs ==
Byrne mainly designed churches, though his main Dublin work was the South City Markets in George's Street. His work included:

- Mary Immaculate, Refuge of Sinners Church, Rathmines, Dublin, extended (date unknown) church (designed by Patrick Byrne, 1854)
- Church of the Sacred Heart, the Crescent, Limerick, 1868
- Design for interior of Chapel, St Patrick's College, Maynooth, entry was unsuccessful, 1888
- South City Markets, South Great George's Street, 1881
- Former Dockrells, South Great George's Street, Dublin, 1888
- Tholsel, Drogheda, County Louth, 1890 conversion of 1770 building by George Darley into a bank
- Sheil Hospital, Ballyshannon, County Donegal, 1891
- MacHale Memorial Church, Tubbernavine, County Mayo, 1891
- Church of the Three Patrons, Rathgar, Dublin, 1891 (facade for church built from 1860 to 1862 by Patrick Byrne)
- Church of the Immaculate Conception, Louth, County Louth, 1892
- De La Salle College Waterford, 1894
- Presbytery, Roscommon, County Roscommon, 1895
- Conciliation Hall, Burgh Quay, Dublin, 1897 (rebuild of 1843 building by Peter Martin as a concert hall)
- Holy Redeemer Church, Bray, 1898 (remodelling of 1852 church by Peter Byrne)
- Carmelite Abbey, Loughrea, County Galway, 1899
- Church of the Assumption, Howth, 1899
- Former bank, Thomas Street, Dublin, 1902
- Mary Immaculate College, Limerick, 1903
- St Joseph's Church, Terenure, 1904
- St John's Church, Dublin Road, Kilkenny, 1907
- No 58, Upper O'Connell Street, Dublin, 1922 (date rebuilt)
