= Chapelizod =

Suburb of Dublin, Ireland

Chapelizod Séipéal Iosóid
- Suburb (village core)
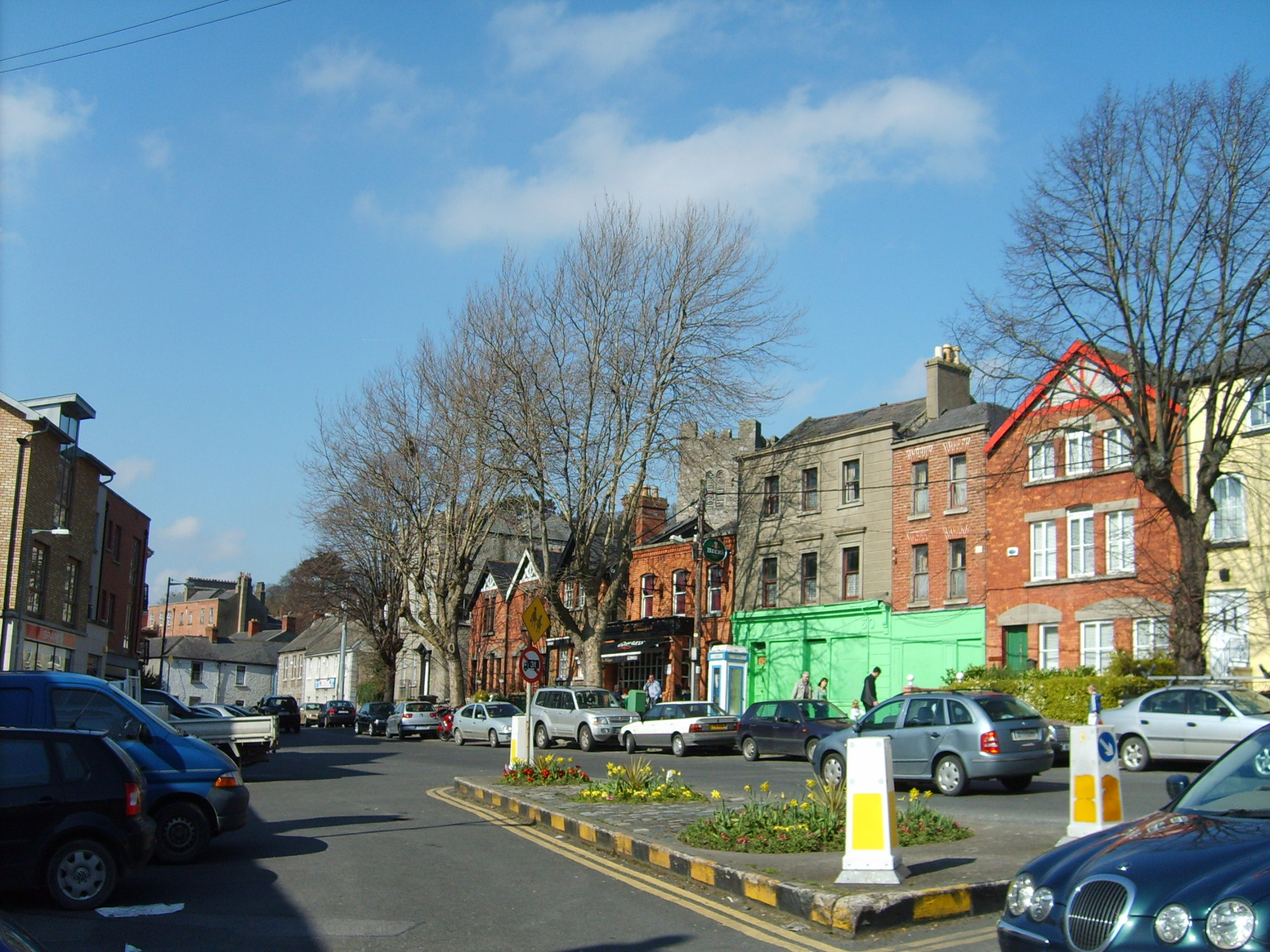
- Chapelizod village

- Location in Ireland
- Coordinates: 53.347°N 6.345°W
- Country: Ireland
- Province: Leinster
- Local authority: Dublin City Council
- Elevation: 10 m (33 ft)

Population (2016)
  - Total: 3,056
- Eircode routing key: D10, D20
- Irish Grid Reference: O236249

Chapelizod (Irish: Séipéal Iosóid, meaning 'Iseult's chapel') is a suburban village of Dublin, Ireland. It lies in the wooded valley of the River Liffey, near the Strawberry Beds and the Phoenix Park. The village is associated with Iseult of Ireland and the location of Iseult's chapel. Chapelizod is under the administration of Dublin City Council.

== Location ==
The civil parish of Chapelizod is part of the barony of Castleknock. The parish consists of a single townland of the same name. However, 465 acres are within the walls of the Phoenix Park while the village proper, outside the walls, contains only 67 acres. It is the only parish of the barony that lies outside the territory of the modern county of Fingal.

Chapelizod forms part of the local electoral area of Ballyfermot–Drimnagh within the Dublin City Council administrative area.

== History ==
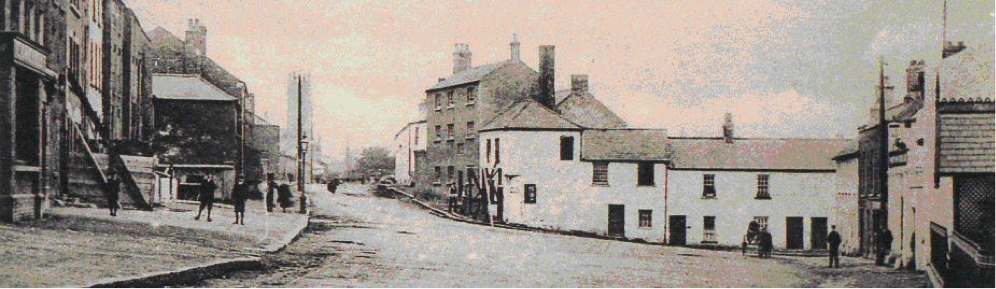
Chapelizod c.1900

There is evidence of Neolithic settlement between the southern ridge of the Phoenix Park and the Liffey and several burial mounds exist to the north of the village. Aerial photography has also revealed several prehistoric and early medieval settlements in the vicinity of the modern village. Aside from these archaeological remains, the etymology of the village indicates an association with Princess Iseult or Isolde from the Arthurian legend of Tristan and Isolde; the village derives its name from a chapel consecrated in her honour.

The historical record details the establishment of a manor by Hugh Tyrell after the Anglo-Norman invasion of 1169. In 1177, Tyrell, Baron of Castleknock, granted lands at Kilmainham to the Priory of St. John of Jerusalem (Knights Hospitallers). The grant included a portion of the land that now makes up Phoenix Park and Chapelizod. In 1200, the land in Chapelizod was leased by King John to Richard De La Field, and was leased by the family for 200 years. The area is referenced as 'capella Isolde' in 1228 in the Register Book of the Archbishops of Dublin.

During the 1500s, crown yeoman and chief sergeant of County Dublin, Robert Savage, lived in Chapelizod. In the 1600s, Sir John Davies, Attorney-General for Ireland, and Sir Henry Power lived in the area.

After the dissolution of the monasteries, the lands reverted to the Crown and from that time onward were used as a Royal seat. This was made explicit by the Duke of Ormonde after he successfully lobbied for the creation of an enclosed deer park outside Dublin in 1662. The King's House, a Royal Residence built by and used as an out-of-town residence by the Viceroy, formerly faced the millrace on the banks of the Liffey. It was used as the royal residence in Ireland until the mid-eighteenth century when the Viceregal Lodge was completed in the Phoenix Park.

In 1671, Colonel Richard Lawrence settled a number of Huguenots in the village with the intention of establishing a linen industry (with some success). Later, William III stayed during the Williamite Wars in Ireland, holding court and redressing grievances.

During much of the eighteenth and nineteenth centuries, Chapelizod was a prosperous village close to the centre of Dublin.

== Transport ==
Chapelizod is served by Dublin Bus route 80 which runs every 10-15 minutes throughout the day. Additionally, routes C5 and C6 run at night with a combined frequency of 30 minutes. The south-western portion of Chapelizod is served by Go-Ahead Ireland route L55 which runs hourly. There are no train or Luas stations in Chapelizod.

== Religion ==
=== Roman Catholic ===
Chapelizod is a parish in the Blanchardstown deanery of the Roman Catholic Archdiocese of Dublin.

In the 19th century, the parish of Blanchardstown in the Catholic Church encompassed much of the area now within the Dublin 15 postal district. Following the relaxation of the Penal Laws, it became possible for Catholics to consider the construction of additional churches and to repair the existing stock of religious buildings. St Brigid's Church Blanchardstown, not to be confused with a church of the Church of Ireland in nearby Castleknock, was constructed in 1837 upon the foundation of a church that had been built prior to 1731. It is the mother church of 12 other churches constituted out of the parish over the following 156 years. Among these was the church of the Nativity of the Blessed Virgin Mary. The parish separated from Blanchardstown in 1883. The eastern part of the new parish was, in turn, constituted out of Chapelizod in 1953 as the Navan Road parish of Our Lady Help of Christians.

=== Church of Ireland ===
In the Church of Ireland, St. Laurence's Church, with its 14th-century bell tower, is one of two churches that today form part of the parish of Crumlin, Dublin.

== In literature ==
The village is the setting of Joseph Sheridan Le Fanu's novel The House by the Churchyard and his short story "Ghost Stories of Chapelizod". The Georgian house, where Le Fanu lived during his early childhood, stands at the corner of Church Lane.

In James Joyce's short story "A Painful Case", published in Dubliners, it is the home of the unsociable protagonist James Duffy, who "lived in Chapelizod because he wished to live as far as possible from the city of which he was a citizen and because he found all the other suburbs of Dublin mean, modern and pretentious". It is the setting—as well as the scene of the home and hostelry of the protagonist Humphrey Chimpden Earwicker, his wife Anna Livia Plurabelle, and their family Shaun, Shem and Issy—in Joyce's final major work, Finnegans Wake.

== Sport ==
Chapelizod is home to Chapelizod Cricket Club (CCC). As of 2025, the club were the holders of the Kumasi Cup, the Toucan Cup and The Pierre Cup.

The Chapelizod Sports Stadium hosted greyhound racing from 1949 to 1961 and hosted speedway from 1950 to 1961.

Chapelizod is also home to Chapelizod F.C., an association football club which won the Sydney Bellow cup and league shield in 2013.

== Notable residents ==
- Garech Browne (1939–2018), art collector
- Henry Capell, Baron Capell of Tewkesbury (1638–1696), English politician
- Frank Harte (1933–2005), musician, song collector, lecturer.
- Alfred Harmsworth, 1st Viscount Northcliffe (1865–1922), newspaper owner
- Tim Healy (1855–1931), politician, writer, barrister, first governor-general of the Irish Free State
- Delia Murphy (1902–1971), singer and music collector
- Joseph Sheridan le Fanu (1814–1873), writer
- Karl Shiels (1972–2019), actor
- Ian Wiley (b.1968), slalom canoeist

== See also ==
- List of towns and villages in Ireland
