= Chapelizod Sports Stadium =

Former sporting venue in Dublin, Ireland

- Interactive map of Chapelizod Sports Stadium
- Location: Chapelizod Road, Chapelizod, Dublin, Ireland
- Coordinates: 53°20′49.3″N 6°20′34.4″W

Construction
- Opened: 1949
- Closed: c.1961

Chapelizod Sports Stadium was a greyhound racing and speedway stadium in Chapelizod Road, Chapelizod, Dublin, Ireland.

== History ==
=== Origins ===
Plans were drawn up during 1949 for a new Sports Stadium called the Chapelizod Sports Stadium, on an eight-acre site on the north bank of the River Liffey and south of Phoenix Park. The cost to construct the stadium was £30,000.

=== Greyhound racing ===
The greyhound racing started on 26 December 1949. The company responsible for the introduction of racing was the Dublin Greyhound Stadium Ltd, and the directors were I.Geller, J.T.Dixon, D.Geller, W.H.Kearney and J.K.P.Ingram. However, a licence could not be obtained from the Irish Coursing Club under the 50 miles rule (other tracks within 50 miles could object to a licence being granted for a new track). Harold's Cross Stadium agreed but Shelbourne Park refused, so therefore racing was unlicensed. The Irish Coursing Club also refused a licence to race during the winter of 1950 despite the other tracks closing for the season.

=== Speedway ===
The stadium also hosted speedway from 1950 to 1954 and 1961. The team raced as the Dublin Lizods, Dublin Eagles and Dublin Falcons at various promotions.

== Closure ==
The greyhound operation continued until around c.1960. The site was demolished and today is the Chapelizod Industrial Estate. The site should not be confused with the current Donore Harriers Athletics Stadium on the site of an old football pitch to the east of the former Chapelizod Stadium.
