= List of Wasians =

Notable people of mixed East Asian and white descent

This a list of Wasians, people of mixed East Asian and white descent.

== British Wasians ==
- Model Devon Aoki has a Japanese father (Hiroaki Aoki) and German/English mother
- Formula 1 driver Alex Albon has a British father (Nigel Albon) and a Thai mother
- Actress Kate Beckinsale has a Anglo-Burmese father (Richard Beckinsale) and English mother (Judy Loe)
- Youtuber Alex Burriss has a British father and Filipino mother
- Actress Christina Chong has a Chinese father and English mother
- Actor Tommy Chong has a Chinese-Canadian father and a mother of Scottish and Irish ancestry
- Model Alexa Chung has a Chinese father and English mother
- Actress Piper Curda has a Korean-American father and Scottish mother
- Diver Vicki Draves has a Filipino father and English mother
- Actor and musician William Gao has an English father and Chinese mother
- Actor Henry Golding has English and Malaysian heritage
- Model and beauty queen winner of the Miss Universe 2018 Catriona Gray has a Scottish-Australian father and Filipina mother
- Actor Remy Hii has a Chinese-Malaysian father and a British mother
- Actress and singer Vanessa Hudgens has an English father and Filipina mother
- Writer Naomi Ishiguro has a Japanese father Kazuo Ishiguro and Scottish mother
- NHL player Paul Kariya has a Japanese-Canadian father and Scottish mother
- Singer and actress Hayley Kiyoko has a father of English and Scottish ancestry (Jamie Alcroft) and a Canadian-Japanese mother (Sarah Kawahara)
- Actress Nancy Kwan was Cantonese (from her father) and British (from her mother)
- Actress Sara Malakul Lane has a Scottish father and Thai mother
- Musician Sean Lennon has a father of English, Welsh and Irish descent (John Lennon) and a Japanese mother (Yoko Ono)
- Model Charles Melton has an English father and Korean-American mother
- Actress Shay Mitchell has a father of Scottish and Irish descent and Filipina mother
- Singer and actress Nia Peeples has a father of Scottish, English, and Irish ancestry and Filipino mother
- Actress Cassie Steele has an English-Canadian father and Filipina mother
- Actor and stunt performer Lewis Tan has a Chinese Singaporean father and English mother

== Croatian Wasians ==
- Tennis player Lulu Sun has a Croatian father and Chinese mother

== Danish Wasians ==
- Retired United States Army Major General Bert Mizusawa has a Japanese-American father and Dutch mother
- Singer Mina Okabe has a Japanese father and Danish mother
- Actor, director, and scriptwriter David Sakurai has a Japanese father and Danish mother

== Dutch Wasians ==
- Actress Kristin Kreuk has a Dutch father and Chinese mother
- Dutch politician Mariko Peters has a Dutch father and Japanese mother
- Saartje Specx had a Dutch father (Jacques Specx) and a Japanese mother
- Musician Eddie Van Halen has a Dutch father and Euro-Indonesian mother
- Speed skater Kai Verbij has a Dutch father and Japanese mother

== French Wasians ==
- Actress Florence Faivre has a French father and Thai mother
- Actress Bérénice Marlohe has a father of Cambodian and Chinese descent and French mother
- Actress Mei Melançon has a father of Chinese and Japanese descent and French mother
- Director, model, and actress Noémie Nakai has a Japanese father and French mother
- Actress France Nuyen has a Vietnamese father and French mother
- Model Mika Schneider has a French father and Japanese mother.
- Musician and game developer Laura Shigihara has a Japanese father and a French American mother
- Actress Élodie Yung has a Cambodian father and French mother

== Greek Wasians ==
- Actor Dave Bautista has a Filipino father and Greek mother

== German Wasians ==
- Actress Lulu Antariksa has an Indonesian father and German mother
- Model Devon Aoki has a Japanese father (Hiroaki Aoki) and German/English mother
- Darren Criss's father was of English, German, and Irish descent and his mother is of Chinese, Filipino and Spanish descent
- Singer and model Ella Gross has a German-American father and South Korean mother.
- Singer Hueningkai has a German-American father and a South Korean mother
- YouTuber Markiplier has a German-American father and Korean mother
- Singer Wentz Eiji has a German-American father and Japanese mother
- Model and beauty queen winner Miss Universe 2015 Pia Wurtzbach has a German father and Filipina mother
- Online streamer and YouTuber Valkyrae has a German father and Filipina mother

== Hungarian Wasians ==
- Short track speed skaters Shaolin Sándor and Shaoang Liu have a Chinese father and a Hungarian mother

== Icelandic Wasians ==
- Singer Laufey has an Icelandic father and Chinese mother

== Italian Wasians ==
- Singer Ai has a Japanese (Native Okinawan) father and Italian-American mother
- Singer Angela Aki has a Japanese father and a Italian-American mother
- Singer Namie Amuro has a Japanese father and a mother of Italian ancestry
- Actress Natasha Liu Bordizzo has a Chinese father and Italian-Australian mother
- Model and beauty pageant crowned Miss Universe Philippines 2022 Celeste Cortesi has an Italian father and Filipino mother
- Racing driver Kei Cozzolino has an Italian father and Japanese mother
- Model Akemi Darenogare has a Japanese Brazilian father and Italian-Brazilian mother
- Actress and model Rosa Kato has an Italian father and Japanese mother
- Actor Alex Landi is half Italian, half Korean
- Model and actress Serena Motola has an Italian-American father and Japanese mother
- Actress and model Hikari Mori has a Japanese father and Italian-American mother

== Irish Wasians ==
- Actor Charlie Bushnell has an Irish father and Japanese-Costa Rican mother
- Actress Anna Cathcart has an Irish father and Chinese mother
- American far-right political activist Joey Gibson has an Irish father and Japanese-American mother
- Singer Conan Gray has an Irish father and Japanese mother
- Actress Megan Lawless has an Irish-American father and Taiwanese mother
- Actress Havana Rose Liu has a Chinese father and Irish mother
- Actor Bob Morley has an Irish-Australian father and Filipina mother
- Japanese politician Kimi Onoda has an Irish American father and Japanese mother

== Jewish Wasians ==
- Actress and beauty pageant winner 2012 Miss LA Chinatown Laur Allen has a Jewish father and Chinese mother
- Singer Brooke Alexx has a Jewish-American father and Japanese-American mother
- Dancer Cheryl Burke has a Ashkenazi Jewish father and Filipina mother
- Actor Rob Schneider has a Jewish father and a Catholic Filipino-American mother

== Lebanese Wasians ==
- Actress Jessy Mendiola has a Lebanese father and Filipino mother

== Norwegian Wasians ==
- Norwegian politician Naomi Ichihara Røkkum has a Norwegian father and Japanese mother

== Polish Wasians ==
- Speed skater J. R. Celski has a Polish-American father and Filipino-American mother
- Singer-songwriter Karen O has a Polish-American father and Korean mother
- Actress Maria Zhang has a Chinese father and a Polish mother

== Rusyn Wasians ==
- Professional tennis player Jessica Pegula has a father with Carpatho-Rusyn origins (Terry Pegula) and a mother with Korean and Japanese roots (Kim Pegula)

== Slovenian Wasians ==
- Footballer Marcel Petrov has a Slovenian father and a Chinese mother

== Spanish Wasians ==
- Singer Enrique Iglesias has a Spanish father (Julio Iglesias) and Spanish-Filipina mother (Isabel Preysler)
- Model and actress Marian Rivera has a Spanish father and Filipino mother
- Singer Yu Shirota has a Japanese father and Spanish mother
- Argentinian actress China Suárez's father has Spanish ancestry (from Galicia and Catalonia) while her mother has Japanese ancestry
- Model Anna Umemiya has a Japanese father (Tatsuo Umemiya) and Spanish-American mother

== Swedish Wasians ==
- Pianist Ingrid Fuzjko Hemming had a Swedish father (Gösta Georgii-Hemming) and Japanese mother
- Singer-songwriter Maia Hirasawa has a Japanese father and a Swedish mother
- Singer Megan Skiendiel has a Swedish-American father and Chinese Singaporean mother

== White South African Wasians ==
- Singer Anza Ohyama has a Japanese father and White South African mother

== Wasians of mixed white descent ==
- Actress Sonya Balmores has a Filipino father and mother of Irish and Native American descent
- Actor Darren Barnet has a father of German and Cherokee descent and Swedish-Japanese mother
- Actors Isa and Teo Briones have a Filipino father (Jon Jon Briones) and a mother of Swedish and Irish descent
- Actor Ross Butler has an English-Dutch father and Chinese-Malaysian mother
- Actor Johnny Yong Bosch has a father of Irish and German descent and Korean mother
- Actor Dean Cain has a Japanese-American father and a mother of Welsh, Irish, and French Canadian ancestry
- Businesswoman and former actress Phoebe Cates has a Russian-Jewish father and Chinese-Filipino mother
- Singer Jay Chang has an Irish-Hungarian father and Filipino-Chinese mother
- Actress Auliʻi Cravalho has a father of Chinese, Puerto Rican, Portuguese, and Irish descent and a Native Hawaiian mother
- Darren Criss's father was of English, German, and Irish descent and his mother is of Chinese, Filipino and Spanish descent
- Actor Ivan Dorschner has a German-Irish father and Filipino mother
- Actor James Duval has a father with Irish and Native American ancestry and Franco-Vietnamese mother
- Actress Midori Francis has a Japanese father and a mother of Irish and Italian descent
- Actress and singer Kimiko Glenn has a father of Scottish, Irish, and German descent and a Japanese mother
- Actor Mark-Paul Gosselaar has a father of German and Dutch Jewish ancestry and Dutch-Indonesian mother
- Musician Kirk Hammett has a father of English, German, Scottish, and Irish ancestry and a Filipino mother
- Brazilian politician Kim Kataguiri has a Japanese Brazilian father and Italian-Portuguese Brazilian mother
- Singer Elle King has a father of Jewish and Filipino ancestry (Rob Schneider) and a mother of English and Scottish ancestry
- Actress Pom Klementieff has a Russian-French father and Korean mother
- Writer María Kodama had a Japanese father and Argentine mother of Swiss-German, English and Spanish descent
- Actors and martial artists Brandon and Shannon Lee have a father of Chinese, Dutch Jewish, and English ancestry (Bruce Lee) and a mother of Swedish, Irish, and English descent (Linda Lee Cadwell)
- Actress Peyton Elizabeth Lee has a Chinese father and a mother of English, Irish and Italian descent
- Singer Bruno Mars has a father of Puerto Rican and Ashkenazi Jewish descent with Hungarian and Ukrainian ancestral roots and a Filipino mother
- YouTubers Veronica and Vanessa Merrell have a father of Irish and German descent and a mother of Spanish, Portuguese, Filipino, and Mexican descent
- Actor and director Max Minghella has an Italian father (Anthony Minghella) and a mother of Chinese, Indian Parsi and Jewish, English, Irish, and Swedish ancestry
- Actress Sonoya Mizuno has a Japanese father and British-Argentine mother
- Actress Olivia Munn has a father is of German, Irish, and English ancestry and a Vietnamese mother with Chinese ancestry
- Actress Janel Parrish has a father of German, Irish, and English descent and a Chinese-American mother
- Actor Lou Diamond Phillips has a father of Scots-Irish and Cherokee descent and a Filipina mother
- Actor and martial artist Ryan Potter has a Japanese father and a mother of mixed English, German, Swedish, Russian Jewish, and Ukrainian Jewish ancestry
- Actress Maggie Q has a father of Polish and Irish descent and a Vietnamese mother
- Actor Keanu Reeves has an American father of Chinese, Hawaiian, English, and Portuguese descent and an English mother
- YouTuber Lauren Riihimaki has a father of Finnish and Ukrainian descent and a Japanese mother
- Singer Olivia Rodrigo has a Filipino father and a mother of German and Irish heritage
- Singer Nicole Scherzinger has a Filipino father and a mother of Native Hawaiian, Polish, Russian, and Ukrainian descent
- Actresses Anne and Jasmine Curtis-Smith have a father of German, Italian, Irish, and English ancestry and a Filipina mother of Chinese and Spanish ancestry
- Academic and Barack Obama's half-sister Maya Soetoro-Ng has an Indonesian father (Lolo Soetoro) and an American mother of Swiss, German, Irish, Scottish, Welsh and English descent (Ann Dunham)
- Singer Jeon Somi has a father of German and Dutch descent and Korean mother
- Musicians Shannyn Sossamon and Jenny Lee Lindberg have a father of Dutch, English, German, French and Irish ancestry and a mother of Filipino and Hawaiian descent
- Basketball coach Erik Spoelstra has a father of Dutch and Irish descent and Filipino mother
- Actor Booboo Stewart has a father of Russian, Scottish and Native American descent and a mother of Japanese, Chinese, and Korean descent
- Model Chrissy Teigen has a father of Norwegian, German and Sinti descent and a Thai mother
- Actresses Jennifer and Meg Tilly have a Chinese-American father and a Canadian mother of Irish, Finnish, and Native American ancestry.
- Singer-songwriter mxmtoon has a German-Scottish father and Chinese-American mother
- Actor Hudson Williams has a father of British and Dutch descent and a Korean mother
- Actress Elizabeth Yu has a Korean father and a mother of German, Irish and Polish ancestry

== Wasians of unknown white descent ==
- YouTuber, comedian, actress, and filmmaker Anna Akana has a European American father and a mother of Japanese, Filipina, and Native Hawaiian descent
- Actresses Sydney and Siena Agudong have a Filipino father and a Caucasian American mother
- Former actress Nicole Gale Anderson has a white American father and a Filipina mother
- Actress Aubrey Anderson-Emmons has a European-American father and a Korean-American mother (Amy Anderson)
- Australian figure skater Hana Bath has a white Australian father and Japanese mother
- Actress and singer Chloe Bennet has a Chinese father and an Anglo-American mother
- Actress Moon Bloodgood has a white American father and Korean mother
- Actress Chelsea Clark has a white Canadian father and Filipina mother
- Actress Christina Chang has a Chinese-Filipino father and American mother
- Rugby player Andre Jin Coquillard has a European American father and a Korean mother
- YouTuber Jaiden Dittfach has a white Canadian father and Japanese-Canadian mother
- Actress Maya Erskine has a white American father (Peter Erskine) and Japanese-American mother
- Fashion designer and beauty queen winner of Miss Universe 2022 R'Bonney Gabriel has a Filipino father and white American mother
- Freestyle skier and model Eileen Gu has a white American father and Chinese mother
- American diplomat and retired United States Navy four-star admiral Harry B. Harris Jr. has a white American father and Japanese mother
- Actor Nico Hiraga has a Japanese father and white American mother
- Actress Celina Jade has an American father (Roy Horan) and Chinese mother
- Actress Mel Jarnson has a Thai father and Australian mother
- Actor Sean Kaufman has an American father and Japanese-American mother
- Fencer Lee Kiefer has a white American father and Filipino mother
- Stand-up comedian and actor Jo Koy has a white American father and Filipina mother
- Model Vanessa Lachey has a white American father and Filipino mother
- Baseball player Tim Lincecum has a white American father and Filipino mother
- Figure skater Alysa Liu has a Chinese father and anonymous white egg donor
- Singer Danielle Marsh has an Australian father and South Korean mother
- Actor Steven R. McQueen has a father of Filipino and Scottish ancestry (Chad McQueen) and a white American mother
- Fencer Gerek Meinhardt has a white American father and Taiwanese mother
- Model Kelsey Merritt has an American father and Filipina mother
- Actress Minnie Mills has a white Canadian father and Korean mother
- Musician Mitski has a white American father and Japanese mother
- Model Kiko Mizuhara has an American father and Japanese mother
- Chess grandmaster and streamer Hikaru Nakamura has a Japanese father and white American mother
- Singer Nancy has an American father and Korean mother
- Short-track speed skating and Olympic medalist Apolo Ohno has a Japanese father and European-American mother
- Filmmaker Toshi Seeger has a Japanese father and white American mother
- Actress Liza Soberano has a Filipino father and white American mother
- American inventor and politician Kinjiro Matsudaira had a Japanese father (Matsudaira Tadaatsu) and white American mother
- Actress and singer Lola Tung has a Eastern European father and Chinese-Swedish mother
- Visual artist and actress Lauren Tsai has a Chinese-American father and White-American mother
- Actress Chase Sui Wonders has a Chinese father and European American mother
- Businesswoman and fashion designer Sarah Miyazawa LaFleur has an American father (Christopher J. LaFleur), the former United States Ambassador to Malaysia, and Japanese mother (Keiko Miyazawa, who was the daughter of Kiichi Miyazawa, Prime Minister of Japan from 1991 to 1993), older sister of Emma Miyazawa
  - Tarento and actress Emma Miyazawa is the younger sister of Sarah Miyazawa LaFleur and is also the daughter of LaFleur and Miyazawa
- Actress and director Zelda Williams has a white American father (Robin Williams) and mother of Filipino and Finnish descent (Marsha Garces Williams)
- Rapper, singer, and songwriter Vernon has a Korean father and an American mother

== See also ==
- List of hāfu people
