= Emily Goss =

American actress (born 1990)

- Born: Emily Berlese Goss; April 1, 1990 (age 36)
- Occupation: Actress
- Years active: 2007–present

Emily Berlese Goss (born 1990) is an American actress who has played parts in theatre, television and film. She is also a voiceover artiste and a producer. She won three Best Actress awards for The House on Pine Street (2015). In Season of Love (2019) she played a queer character, and has played other queer parts in Snapshots (2018), in a web series, Dating in Place (2020–present), and in various other presentations.

== Early life ==
Goss grew up in San Mateo, California. She attended Crystal Springs Uplands School, where she played soccer, serving as the striker position. Among her teammates were Verónica Pérez, who later played soccer professionally, including with the Mexico women's national football team. Goss started studying theatre at Crystal Springs, after which she spent less time on soccer.

Goss graduated from the USC School of Dramatic Arts and spent twelve months at the London Academy of Music and Dramatic Art, receiving an MA in Classical Acting. According to Goss, the exchange programs available to her from USC did not interest her; instead she opted to pursue her own international studying.

Regarding her acting influences, she mentioned in an interview with Ferntv.ca that they should include Maggie Gyllenhaal, Viola Davis, and Jackie Chan, which last she particularly noted for his stunts.

== Career ==
In 2014, Goss portrayed the role of the main character Jennifer in The House on Pine Street, directed by the Keeling brothers. The film served as a breakout role for Goss, who, after filming, recalled, "I remember saying to friends in LA when I came back from Kansas, if nothing else happens, THAT just happened. And that's enough. It still is." The film made its world premiere at the Cinequest Film Festival, and Goss' role as Jennifer won her a Best Actress nomination and three Best Actress awards. Austin and Aaron Keeling, like Goss, were alumni of USC, but they did not work together there. They were certainly acquainted by the end of the filming, however, since the cast and crew were lodged at the house of the film's title while filming. She said that she loved living in the 1840s house, describing it as "like living in a museum". In the film she had to wear a pregnancy prosthetic, but still managed her own stunts.

She also won two Best Actress awards, including a Best Supporting Actress nod from the IFS Film Festival, for her role as Louise. The 2018 film Snapshots, which is set in the 1960s, has Rose (Shannon Collis), a younger woman, becoming romantically involved with Louise, a poetry-lover. An inspiration for this film was a 1930s affair between Louise, a photographer, and the mother of Jan Miller Corran who wrote and produced it. Goss had been a fan of Jane the Virgin, directed by Melanie Mayron, who also played Professor Donaldson in that film, and when she performed a chemistry read for Snapshots Goss was "starstruck" by Mayron, and subsequently auditioned for the part in Snapshots.

In 2019, Goss starred in Painting Anna as the fictional painter Anna Katz. The film, directed by Vanessa Pantley, was a "docu-narrative film", where she posed as Anna in real-world settings. She played Iris in the holiday lesbian romantic comedy Season of Love (2019). Iris′ lover is Mardou (Laur Allen), and they are one of three lesbian pairings in the film. Christin Baker was director, and it was released by Tello Films. The film was marketed by its creators as "the first queer women-centric holiday romantic comedy movie".

She had a role in the 2021 horror film Shook, whose theme was social media. It was released on the streaming service Shudder. Goss portrays Nicole, who calls on her influencer sister, protagonist Mia (Daisye Tutor), to watch her dog Chico while she sees a specialist regarding a hereditary disease.

Goss's debut as a director, producer, and writer is slated to be a short film titled A Little House in Aberdeen, in which she is also acting. The film details a story of a woman named Britney who, uncertain and confused about her future, receives an abortion, and banters on the subject of her experiences in a "stream of consciousness" manner with her medic while he performs the operation. The short film is being crowd-sourced by Film Independent, and will reprise a pairing of both Goss and her Season of Love fellow star Laur Allen. Alan Ng of the film website Film Threat noted that Goss's short film was about six-and-a-half minutes, which is "the length of a typical abortion procedure".

== Personal life ==
Regarding her support of the representation of LGBT people and people of color in film, Goss has stated, "The people need to hear the voices we don't hear. We need to welcome them into rooms they have been kept out of and given decision-making positions... But we mistake by thinking this is where the work ends... And we need to hold the productions and companies in our lives accountable."

== Theatre ==
- Forever Bound, Atwater Village Theatre; Atwater Village, Los Angeles, California, 2018
- Othello, A Noise Within; Pasadena, California, 2018-19
- Rosencrantz and Guildenstern Are Dead, A Noise Within; Pasadena, California, 2018-19
- The Cripple of Inishmaan, Antaeus Theatre Company; Glendale, California, 2019
- Trying, North Coast Repertory Theatre; Solana Beach, California, 2021
- 91505: Burband "True Sound", Antaeus Theatre Company; Glendale, California, 2021

== Filmography ==
=== Film ===
Year	Title	Role	Notes
2010	Kaka Nirvana	Hippie Girl	Short film
2012	The Good Fight	Emi	Short film; also writer
2015	The House on Pine Street	Jennifer	Lead role
2015	Zoe and the Prince	Princess Zoe Hartsinger	Short film; lead role
2015	He Said	Rachel	Short film
2016	American Bred	Katherine Daughtry	
2016	AKA Amber	Amber	Short film
2017	Finding No One		Short film; writer, director, narrator
2017	Suburbicon	Clinic Mom	Uncredited
2017	Blood Prose	Miriam Gladstone	Short film
2017	Herowood, CA	Lazer	Short film
2018	Snapshots	Louise	
2018	Jane and Emma	Emma Smith	
2018	Royal Shakespeare Company: Twelfth Night	Viola	
2019	Painting Anna	Anna Katz	
2019	The Chalice	Dana	
2019	The Thing Before the Thing	Ryann	
2019	The Case of Jonas Booker	Janet Sinclair	
2019	Season of Love	Iris	
2020	Where the Others Are	Maggie	
2021	Shook	Nicole	
2021	Habit	The Sister	Short film
2024	Traumatika	Alice	
2025	Fireflies in the Dusk	Charlotte	Short film
TBA	A Little House in Aberdeen	Britney	Post-production; short film; also writer, director, and producer

=== Television ===
Year	Title	Role	Notes
2015	Criminal Minds	Charlotte Jacobsen	Episode: "Breath Play"
2016	Castle	Naomi Fox	Episode: "Much Ado About Murder"
2016	The Hotel Barclay	Helen	Episode: "The New Friend"
2017	Future Man	Young Diane / Vanessa	Episode: "Operation: Natal Attraction"
2019	Arun Considers	Anna	Episode: "His Name"
2020	Black Hearted Killer	Emily	TV movie
2020	L.A.'s Finest	Young Gloria Walker	Episode: "Bad Company"
2020–present	Dating in Place	Jo	Web series

=== Other works ===
Year	Title	Role	Notes
2015	Princess Rap Battle	Goldilocks	Music video; Episode: "Cinderella vs. Belle"

== Awards ==
=== Blue Whiskey Independent Film Festival ===
Year	Nominated work	Category	Result	Ref.
2015	The House on Pine Street	Best Actress	Won	

=== Fargo Film Festival ===
Year	Nominated work	Category	Result	Ref.
2015	The House on Pine Street	Best Actress	Won	

=== Independent Filmmakers Showcase IFS Film Festival ===
Year	Nominated work	Category	Result	Ref.
2018	Snapshots	Best Supporting Actress	Won	

=== London International Film Awards ===
Year	Nominated work	Category	Result	Ref.
May 2018	Snapshots	Best Actress	Won	

=== NOLA Horror Film Festival ===
Year	Nominated work	Category	Result	Ref.
2015	The House on Pine Street	Best Actress	Nominated	

=== South Dakota Film Festival ===
Year	Nominated work	Category	Result	Ref.
2015	The House on Pine Street	Jury Award for Best Actress	Won	
