= I Hate New Year's =

American film

I Hate New Year's is a 2020 American musical romantic comedy film directed by Christin Baker, with a screenplay written by Kathryn Trammell. The film stars Dia Frampton, Ashley Argota, and Candis Cayne.

The film was produced in-house by Tello Films, which released it on their streaming platform on December 4, 2020.

== Synopsis ==
Layne Price has enjoyed a successful music career, however she's hit a creative roadblock that she's unable to overcome. Interpreting advice from a fortune-teller as meaning that she should revisit her roots, Layne sets out to return to her hometown of Nashville, Tennessee, for New Year's Eve. Her best friend Cassie is determined to confess her love to Layne, however Layne herself is more interested in finding one of her exes. As the two search, Layne finds herself starting to realize that she may be in love with Cassie as well.

== Cast ==
- Dia Frampton as Layne Price
- Ashley Argota as Cassie Holmes
- Candis Cayne as Zelena / Marley
- Andrew Brennan as Freddie
- Tamiko Robinson Steele as Toni

== Production ==
Following the release of the 2019 holiday film Season of Love, Tello Films announced I Hate New Year's in early 2020. Principal photography occurred in March 2020, and the film was shot on location in Nashville, Tennessee.

== Release ==
I Hate New Year's was released digitally on December 4, 2020.

== Reception ==
Critical reception for I Hate New Year's has been mixed and the film holds a rating of 60% on Rotten Tomatoes, based on 5 reviews. Common Sense Media gave the movie 1 out of 5 stars, writing that "It's not very good, and its production values aren't fancy, but I Hate New Year's may still be meaningful to LGBTQ+ teens who want to see themselves in onscreen love stories." Film Threat was more favorable, as they felt that "Director Christin Baker uses all the props of social media and the standard nuances of a classic New Year’s Eve night out to deliver a “happy and gay” comedic love story, one that will be happily rewatched every holiday season."
