= Cynthia Gouw =

American actress and TV host

Cynthia Gie-Kiok Gouw
- Born: May 30, 1963 (age 63); Pasadena, California, U.S.
- Occupations: Journalist, actress, model
- Years active: 1984–present

Cynthia Gouw (born May 30, 1963) is an American actress, model, and TV news anchor and host.

== Biography ==
One of Gouw's great grandfathers moved from Xiamen, China to Indonesia, where he started a department store chain. Her parents, both Chinese immigrants from Indonesia, went to university in the Netherlands and moved to California in 1961. In 1963, she became the first in her family to be born in the United States.

She grew up with her parents and brother in El Cerrito, California and graduated from the high school there in 1981. She then attended UCLA, where she majored in political science and international relations and minored in Asian American studies. She also edited Pacific Ties, UCLA's Asian-American newspaper and interned for Willie Brown. In 1991, she graduated from UCLA School of Law.

== Career ==
=== Modeling ===
She entered Miss LA Chinatown on an assignment for Pacific Ties in 1984 but ended up winning the pageant and moving on to win Miss Chinatown USA the following year. She won the Spokesmodel competition on Star Search in 1988, the first Asian American to do so.

In 2005, she placed third in the More Magazine and Wilhelmina 40+Model Search. She has been a spokesperson for L'Oréal.

=== Acting ===
She appeared as Romulan Ambassador Caithlin Dar in the movie Star Trek V: The Final Frontier. She also appeared in China Beach and Matlock.

=== Journalism and broadcasting ===
Throughout her career, Gouw has worked as a reporter and/or news anchor for KTVU, E!, Channel 26, Continental Cablevision, KXTV, KDFW, CBS, KERO-TV, KABC-TV, and NPR San Francisco. She was previously a reporter for Pacific Time and was KDFW's first Asian-American news anchor.

In 1996, while working for Channel 10 in Sacramento, she won a Regional Emmy for her feature Is Your Kid in a Gang?. She won another award the following year with photographer Mike Garza for their work on The Promised Land, a feature about illegal immigration.

In 1998, she won a third Emmy for Hong Kong: The California Connection in the current affairs programming category. She has also won 4 Society of Professional Journalism Awards and was honored with a "Best TV Talk Show Series in the State" nod from the Pennsylvania Association of Broadcasters. In Philadelphia, Gouw hosted Asian Outlook, a half-hour talk show focused on the affairs of the Pacific Rim for WYBE.

Gouw was named Member of the Year by the Chinese American Council and Honoree of the Year by the Asian Bar Association of Sacramento. She has also been recognized by the California State Legislature, and is on the Advisory Board of Stanford University's "Grade the News".

== Personal life ==
She has a daughter and two step-children. Her husband Doug Alexander is a businessman and was one of the original board members of Actua Corporation, and has been in senior management positions in a number of start-ups and Actua spinoffs. She briefly dated Andrew Mountbatten-Windsor in the 2000s.

== Filmography ==
Year	Title	Role	Notes
1986	The Serpent Warriors	Cult Extra	
1988	Freddy's Nightmares	Waitress	Episode: Saturday Night Special
1989	Kinjite: Forbidden Subjects	Japanese hostess	
1989	Big Man on Campus	Reporter #3	
1989	Matlock	Tami Fields	Episode: The Model
1989	Star Trek V: The Final Frontier	Caithlin Dar	
1989	Man Against the Mob: The Chinatown Murders	Lyn Chiang	Television film
1991	China Beach	Loretta	Episode: The Always Goodbye
1992	The Heart of Justice	Airline clerk	Television film
2019	KQED Newsroom	Guest Anchor	Episode: October 25, 2019
