= Snapshots (2018 film) =

2018 American film directed by Melanie Mayron

- Film poster
- Directed by: Melanie Mayron
- Written by: Jan Miller Corran; Katherine Cortez
- Story by: Jan Miller Corran
- Produced by: Jan Miller Corran; Leeanne Matusek
- Starring: Piper Laurie; Brooke Adams
- Cinematography: Michael Negrin
- Edited by: Josh Rifkin
- Music by: David Michael Frank
- Production company: Three Women in a Box Films
- Distributed by: Gravitas Ventures
- Release date: May 20, 2018 (Des Moines)
- Running time: 95 minutes
- Country: United States
- Language: English

Snapshots is a 2018 American independent drama film directed by Melanie Mayron and starring Piper Laurie and Brooke Adams.

== Cast ==
- Piper Laurie as Rose
- Emily Baldoni as Allison
- Brooke Adams as Patty
- Shannon Collis as Young Rose
- Emily Goss as Louise
- Brett Dier as Zee
- Max Adler as Joe
- Cathy DeBuono

== Reception ==
The film has a 71% rating on Rotten Tomatoes.

Guy Lodge of Variety gave the film a negative review and wrote, "Snapshots wallows a little too readily in cliché to be quite as stirring as its story - one drawn from Corran's own family history - sounds on paper."

Frank Scheck of The Hollywood Reporter gave the film a positive review and wrote, "And while the pacing can be a little too leisurely at times, it doesn't prevent Snapshots from being a mature, reflective drama that is all the more effective for its restraint."

Paul Parcellin of Film Threat also gave the film a positive review and wrote, "Fortunately, the film avoids taking us down a predictable path and instead provides what feels like a more true to life recollection of days gone by."
