= Miss Chinese International Pageant 2013 =

Beauty pageant

- Date: February 24, 2013
- Presenters: Eric Tsang, Sammy Leung, Sharon Chan
- Venue: TVB City, Hong Kong
- Broadcaster: TVB
- Entrants: 16
- Placements: 9
- Winner: Gloria Tang 鄧佩儀; Vancouver, Canada
- Congeniality: Lauren Weinberger 周慧倫; Los Angeles, United States

The 24th Miss Chinese International Pageant, Miss Chinese International Pageant 2013 was held on February 24, 2013. Miss Chinese International 2012 Kelly Cheung of Chicago, USA crowned her successor, Gloria Tang of Vancouver, British Columbia, Canada at the end of the pageant.

== Pageant information ==
The slogan to this year's pageant is "A Beautiful Revolution" 「美麗革命」. For the first time since 2007, when the pageant allowed Mainland Chinese delegates to enter, there was no Regional Competition for Mainland China, with only Foshan sending a delegate. With 16 delegates, this was the lowest turnout in pageant history until the 2016 iteration, with 14 contestant entries.

== Results ==
Placement	Contestant	City Represented	Country Represented
Miss Chinese International 2013	Gloria Tang 鄧佩儀	Vancouver	Canada
1st Runner-Up	Denise Tan 陳楚寰	Kuala Lumpur	Malaysia
2nd Runner-Up	Carat Cheung 張名雅	Hong Kong	Hong Kong
Top 5 Finalists	Boonyisa (Poppy) Chantrarachai 王思翊; Jessica Song 宋沁禕	Bangkok; Toronto	Thailand; Canada
Top 9 Semi-finalists	Lauren Weinberger 周慧倫; Jacky Cai 蔡潔; Samantha Chin 陳冠曄; Sunnia Liu 劉夢涵	Los Angeles; Melbourne; Seattle; Sydney	USA; Australia; USA; Australia

=== Special awards ===
Special Awards	Contestant	City/Region Represented	Country Represented
Miss Friendship	Lauren Weinberger 周慧倫	Los Angeles	USA
Star of Tomorrow Award	Jessica Song 宋沁禕	Toronto	Canada
Media Popularity Award	Jacky Cai 蔡潔	Melbourne	Australia

== Judges ==
- Dr. Wong Chi Ho, Jimmy SBS, MH
- Mr.Kenneth Ma
- Ms.Fala Chen
- Ms. TSUI Mei-wan, Josephine MH
- Mr.Lawrence Cheng

== Contestant list ==
No.	Contestant Name	Represented City	Represented Country	Age	Height
1	Catherine Ou Yang 歐陽可心	Auckland	New Zealand	20	5’ 7”
2	Boonyisa (Poppy) Chantrarachai 王思翊	Bangkok	Thailand	21	5’ 8.5”
3	Jessica Chen 湛雨	Chicago	USA	23	5’ 6”
4	Cynthia Qiu 邱芳思	Foshan	China	23	5’ 7.5”
5	Carat Cheung 張名雅	Hong Kong	Hong Kong	25	5’ 4”
6	Denise Tan 陳楚寰	Kuala Lumpur	Malaysia	20	5’ 6”
7	Lauren Weinberger 周慧倫	Los Angeles	USA	23	5’ 4”
8	Natasha Nicole Lee 李真真	Manila	Philippines	20	5’ 2.5”
9	Jacky Cai 蔡潔	Melbourne	Australia	24	5’ 7”
10	Liu Qing Qing Yang 楊柳青青	Montréal	Canada	18	5’ 11”
11	Vivian Li 李思禹	New York City	USA	21	5’ 5.5”
12	Samantha Chin 陳冠曄	Seattle	USA	23	5’ 7”
13	Stella Kae 曲斯云	Singapore	Singapore	23	5’ 5”
14	Sunnia Liu 劉夢涵	Sydney	Australia	23	5’ 6.5”
15	Jessica Song 宋沁禕	Toronto	Canada	23	5’ 5.5”
16	Gloria Tang 鄧佩儀	Vancouver	Canada	20	5’ 6.5”

== Crossovers ==
Contestants who previously competed or will be competing at other international beauty pageants:

Miss International

- 2011: Singapore: Stella KAE
