= Jane and Emma =

2018 film directed by Chantelle Squires

- Jane and Emma Movie Poster
- Directed by: Chantelle Squires
- Screenplay by: Melissa Leilani
- Story by: Tamu Smith; Zandra Vranes
- Starring: Danielle Deadwyler; Emily Goss
- Music by: Mauli Bonner
- Production company: Excel Entertainment
- Release date: 12 October 2018 (Los Angeles)
- Country: United States

Jane and Emma is a 2018 American period drama film following a fictionalized friendship between Emma Smith, the wife of Joseph Smith, and Jane Manning James. The film was directed by Chantelle Squires and written by Melissa Leilani, Tamu Smith, and Zandra Vranes.

It stars Danielle Deadwyler as Jane and Emily Goss as Emma, alongside Brad Schmidt as Joseph Smith.

== Plot ==
Jane is a Black pioneer in 1844 who walks hundreds of miles to return home to see Joseph Smith, the Prophet of the Church of Jesus Christ of Latter-day Saints. On her way to the Smith home Jane is attacked by bandits. She escapes and continues on her way.

Before Jane arrives, Joseph Smith is murdered. When Jane finally makes it to the Smith family home it is a dark and stormy night. She arrives to find Emma in the dark protecting the body of her late husband, Joseph.

Jane offers comfort and companionship to Emma in her darkest hour. The two women stay in the home with a loaded pistol and take turns keeping watch.

In the morning members from their church arrive to give help and prepare the body for burial.

== Cast ==
- Danielle Deadwyler as Jane
- Emily Goss as Emma
- Brad Schmidt as Joseph Smith
- K. Danor Gerald as Issac James
- Clotile Yanna as Angela Manning
- Yolanda Woods as Mama

== Production ==
=== Casting ===
Jeff Johnson, Robert Milo Andrus completed casting for the stars and main characters of the film. Gayle Minkevich-Jensen did casting for all extras.

=== Filming ===
Filming took place in Salt Lake City, Utah, and onsite in Nauvoo, Illinois.

== Release ==
The film was released in theaters on October 12, 2018, with a subsequent release to DVD, and streaming on Amazon Prime Video, Vudu, and Pluto.

== Reception ==
Sean P. Means of The Salt Lake Tribune gave the film 3/4 stars, describing it as an "intimate and intense approach to a historic event" that portrays an "abiding friendship" between two women. Means praised the director and screenwriter for their focus on historical accuracy and attention to detail. He also commended the lead actors for their understated intensity in their respective roles.

Matthew Brooks, a writer for KSL-FM, gave the film a positive review for its portrayal of the strong friendship between Jane and Emma. Brooks highlighted the clever script and solid acting as the movie's main strengths, with Danielle Deadwyler's portrayal of Jane Manning being particularly noteworthy. He also praised Emily Goss's acting and the film's balance in presenting Emma Smith as a gentle woman who must also be a community leader. He noted that the film's nonlinear narrative style may be a weakness, but ultimately found that the movie's emotional climax was fulfilling.
