= The House on Pine Street =

- Theatrical release poster
- Directed by: Aaron Keeling; Austin Keeling
- Written by: Natalie Jones; Aaron Keeling; Austin Keeling
- Produced by: Natalie Jones; Aaron Keeling; Austin Keeling
- Starring: Emily Goss; Taylor Bottles; Cathy Barnett; Jim Korinke; Natalie Pellegrini; Tisha Swart-Entwistle
- Cinematography: Juan Sebastian Baron
- Edited by: Austin Keeling
- Music by: Nathan Matthew David; Jeremy Lamb
- Production company: E3W Productions
- Release date: February 28, 2015 (Cinequest)
- Running time: 111 minutes
- Country: United States
- Language: English

The House on Pine Street is a 2015 independent psychological drama-horror film written by Aaron Keeling, Austin Keeling, and Natalie Jones, and directed by Aaron Keeling and Austin Keeling. The project was partially funded through a Kickstarter campaign. Principal photography took place over 19 days in the spring of 2014.

== Synopsis ==
After an unexpected mental breakdown, Jennifer Branagan regretfully returns to her hometown in Kansas at seven months pregnant. Jennifer fights to regain control of her life while dealing with her anxieties about childbirth, a tense marriage with her husband Luke, and the domineering influence of her own mother Meredith. Jennifer, however, starts to worry that their rented home might be haunted when odd things start happening there. As she tries to figure out what, if anything, is wrong with the house, Jennifer, who is alone in her beliefs, is forced to wonder if she is still sane.

== Cast ==
- Emily Goss as Jennifer
- Taylor Bottles as Luke
- Cathy Barnett as Meredith
- Jim Korinke as Walter
- Natalie Pellegrini as Lauren
- Keagon Ellison as Brad
- Tisha Swart-Entwistle as Marlene

== Production credits ==
- Directors: Aaron Keeling and Austin Keeling
- Producers: Natalie Jones, Aaron Keeling, and Austin Keeling
- Screenwriters: Natalie Jones, Aaron Keeling, and Austin Keeling
- Music: Nathan Matthew David and Jeremy Lamb
- Director of Photography: Juan Sebastian Baron
- Film Editor: Austin Keeling
- Production Designer: Monique Thomas
- Sound: C.J. Drumeller
- Colorist: Taylre Jones
- Hair and Makeup: Colleen Quinn Nosbish
- Stunt Coordinator: Mark Bedell
- Practical Effects Coordinator: Mark Bedell

== Release ==
The world premiere was on February 28, 2015 and was part of the Cinequest Film Festival in San Jose, California that featured over 200 films including 91 World, North American and U.S. Premieres from over 50 countries.

== Reception ==
The San Jose Mercury News named The House on Pine Street as one of the "Cinequest 2015: 6 Films You Need to See".

=== Accolades and awards ===
- Official Selection and World Premiere, Cinequest Film Festival - Silicon Valley
- Cinequest 2015: 6 Films You Need to See
- Audience Favorite for Encore Day Performance, 2015, Cinequest Film Festival, San Jose, California
- Winner, Best Actress, 2015, Emily Gross in The House on Pine Street, Fargo Film Festival, Fargo, North Dakota
- Honorable Mention, Best Narrative Feature, 2015, Fargo Film Festival, Fargo, North Dakota,
- Official Selection, 2015 Sonoma International Film Festival, Sonoma, California
- Official Selection, International Horror and Sci-Fi Film Festival, Phoenix, Arizona
- Encore Screening Selection, International Horror and Sci-Fi Film Festival, Phoenix, Arizona
- Opening Night Feature, FANT Film Festival 2015, Bilbao, Spain
- Non-competing Selection, Nocturna Madrid International Fantastic Film Festival 2015, Madrid, Spain,
- Official Selection, Blue Whiskey Independent Film Festival 2015, Palatine, IL
- Winner, Best Actress: Emily Goss, Blue Whiskey Independent Film Festival 2015, Palatine, IL
- Winner, Best Sound: C.J. Drumeller, Blue Whiskey Independent Film Festival 2015, Palatine, IL
- Winner, Best Effects: Brian Magarian and Matt O'Neill, Blue Whiskey Independent Film Festival 2015, Palatine, IL
- Winner, Promising Filmmakers: Aaron Keeling and Austin Keeling, Blue Whiskey Independent Film Festival 2015, Palatine, IL
- Official Selection, Lost Episode Festival Toronto 2015, Toronto, Canada
- Official Premier Selection, Macabro Festival Internacional de Cine de Horror 2015, Mexico City, Mexico
- Official Selection, NOLA Horror Film Festival 2015, New Orleans, LA
- Winner, Best Director: Aaron Keeling and Austin Keeling, NOLA Horror Film Festival 2015, New Orleans, LA<
- Winner, Best Feature Film, NOLA Horror Film Festival 2015, New Orleans, LA
- Nominated, Best Actress: Emily Goss, NOLA Horror Film Festival 2015, New Orleans, LA
- Nominated, Best Screenplay: Natalie Jones, Aaron Keeling, and Austin Keeling, NOLA Horror Film Festival 2015, New Orleans, LA
- Official Selection, Calgary International Film Festival 2015, Calgary, Canada
- Official Selection, South Dakota Film Festival 2015, Aberdeen, SD
- Best Narrative Feature Film, South Dakota Film Festival 2015, Aberdeen, SD
- Jury Award for Best Actress: Emily Goss, South Dakota Film Festival 2015, Aberdeen, SD
- Official Selection, Kansas International Film Festival 2015, Overland Park, KS
- Jury Award Winner, Best Narrative, Kansas International Film Festival 2015, Overland Park, KS
- Audience Award Winner, Best Narrative Feature Film, Kansas International Film Festival 2015, Overland Park, KS
- Official Selection, Festival de Cine de Terror de Molins de Rei 2015, Barcelona, Spain
