= Sandra Mae Frank =

American actress (born 1990)

- Born: March 21, 1990 (age 36); Louisville, Kentucky, US
- Education: Gallaudet University (BA)
- Occupation: Actress
- Years active: 2013–present
- Awards: Helen Hayes Award (2023); Ben Iden Payne Award (2023)

Sandra Mae Frank (born March 21, 1990) is an American film, television, and theatre actress.

She advocates for deaf actors to be cast on the same level as hearing actors. She is the only deaf actor (As of 26 June 2025) to perform in a lead role in a Broadway musical, having portrayed Wendla in Spring Awakening. Frank expresses her view on deaf acting in an article for the Washington Post. In this article, she uses the hashtag DeafTalent and explains its background.

She starred in the NBC drama series New Amsterdam as Dr. Elizabeth Wilder, which began in September 2018 and concluded in January 2023; she joined the main cast in season 5 after entering the show as a recurring character in season 4. She was also cast in the film The Silent Hour, which was produced in 2023.

Frank works at the Deaf Austin Theatre in Austin, Texas as production manager.

== Early life and education ==
Sandra Mae Frank was born on March 21, 1990, in Louisville, Kentucky. She attended the Louisville Deaf Oral School, now known as Heuser Hearing Institute and Learning Academy, and duPont Manual High School. While attending duPont Manual High School, Frank acted in the Youth Performing Arts School production of Crimes of the Heart.

She graduated from Gallaudet University with a degree in Theatre Arts in 2013.

== Career ==
In 2015, Frank acted in the role of Wendla in the Broadway musical Spring Awakening which included hearing and deaf actors, including Marlee Matlin. "(...) the young female protagonist, Wendla Bergmann, is played by the deaf Sandra Mae Frank, who uses sign language to deliver her lines" Director Michael Arden said "Frank has developed Wendla into a character with more depth and understanding of a girl living in the late 19th century." Frank sign-sang her role in cooperation with a hearing singer.

Frank acted as Hodel in Fiddler on the Roof at the Lyric Theatre of Oklahoma in 2016. Also in this performance, hearing and deaf actors acted together on stage. "Frank demonstrated the power of movement and facial expression as they performed without speaking while others spoke their lines for them. A truly poignant scene was the one where Perchik proposes to Hodel, then they ask for Tevye's blessings rather than his permission."

She was part of the cast in the horror film Soul to Keep in 2018. In the same year, she acted on the stage of Lyric Theatre of Oklahoma for Fun Home. In 2019, Frank appeared as Amy in the science-fiction film Multiverse as a member of a group of students who experiment with the connections between different versions of the universe. Also in this year, she acted in the romantic Christmas film Season of Love.

Frank had a guest appearance as the deaf student Abigail in the show Zoey's Extraordinary Playlist, in episode 9 of the first season, where she sign-singing interpreted Rachel Platten's "Fight Song" in ASL, while the voice is replaced by a cello.

In 2021, Frank entered the NBC TV show New Amsterdam at the beginning of season 4, joining the team of Dr. Goodwin (Ryan Eggold) in the role of deaf oncologist Dr. Elizabeth Wilder. Her role was promoted to main character in season 5 and participated until the ending of the show in January 2023. Again she worked together with Marlee Matlin, who appeared in a guest role. Eventually Frank's role inspires Dr. Goodwin to learn ASL.

She performed the ASL synchronization of the US national anthem and "America the Beautiful" at the 2022 56th Super Bowl in Inglewood, California.

In 2022 Frank was co-director of the musical The Music Man at the Olney Theatre. Her work was recognized with a Helen Hayes Award in 2023. "The fact that a production as ambitious as this works and runs so smoothly is due to the two directors Baron and Frank."

In March 2023, Frank acted in the title role of the Rodgers and Hammerstein musical Cinderella in a mixed deaf and hearing production of Zach Theatre in cooperation with Deaf Austin Theatre. She was awarded the B. Iden Payne Award for "Outstanding Lead Performer in a Musical". Frank was cast in 2022 for the 2023 film The Silent Hour in the role of Ava, co-starring with Joel Kinnaman, Mekhi Phifer and Mark Strong.

== Personal life ==
Frank is deaf, having lost her hearing at the age of three. In most of her performances, she acts using American Sign Language (ASL).

== Filmography ==
=== Film ===
Year	Title	Role	Notes
2014	Beautiful Sounds of Love	Kylie	
2015	Harmony		Short film
2016	The Sound of Fear	Ivy	Short film
2017	The Strength Within You	Woman	Short film
2017	Garage Heat	Zoe	Short film
2018	The Pastman	Woman	Short film
2018	Soul to Keep	Tara	
2019	Multiverse	Amy	Film first titled as Entangled
2019	Season of Love	Kenna	
2024	The Silent Hour	Ava	Cast announced as of January 17, 2023; release October 8, 2024

=== Television ===
Year	Title	Role	Notes
2015	Switched at Birth	Receptionist	
2018	Reverse Polarity	Mary	
2019	Daybreak	Victoria	
2020	Zoey's Extraordinary Playlist	Abigail	performance of "Fight Song", Season 1, episode 9 "Zoey's Extraordinary Silence"
2021–2023	New Amsterdam	Dr. Elizabeth Wilder	Recurring role in season 4, main role in season 5

== Theatre appearances and activities ==
Year	Title	Role	Notes
2015	Spring Awakening	Wendla	Broadway
2016	Fiddler on the Roof	Hodel	Lyric Theatre of Oklahoma
2018	Fun Home	Joan	Lyric Theatre of Oklahoma
2022	The Music Man	none	Co-director
2023	Cinderella	Cinderella	Zach Theatre with Deaf Austin Theatre

== Awards ==
Year	Award	Category	Theatre performance
2023	Helen Hayes Award	Co-direction	The Music Man
2023	B. Iden Payne Award	Outstanding Lead Performer in a Musical	Cinderella
