= Edmonston, Maryland =

- Town
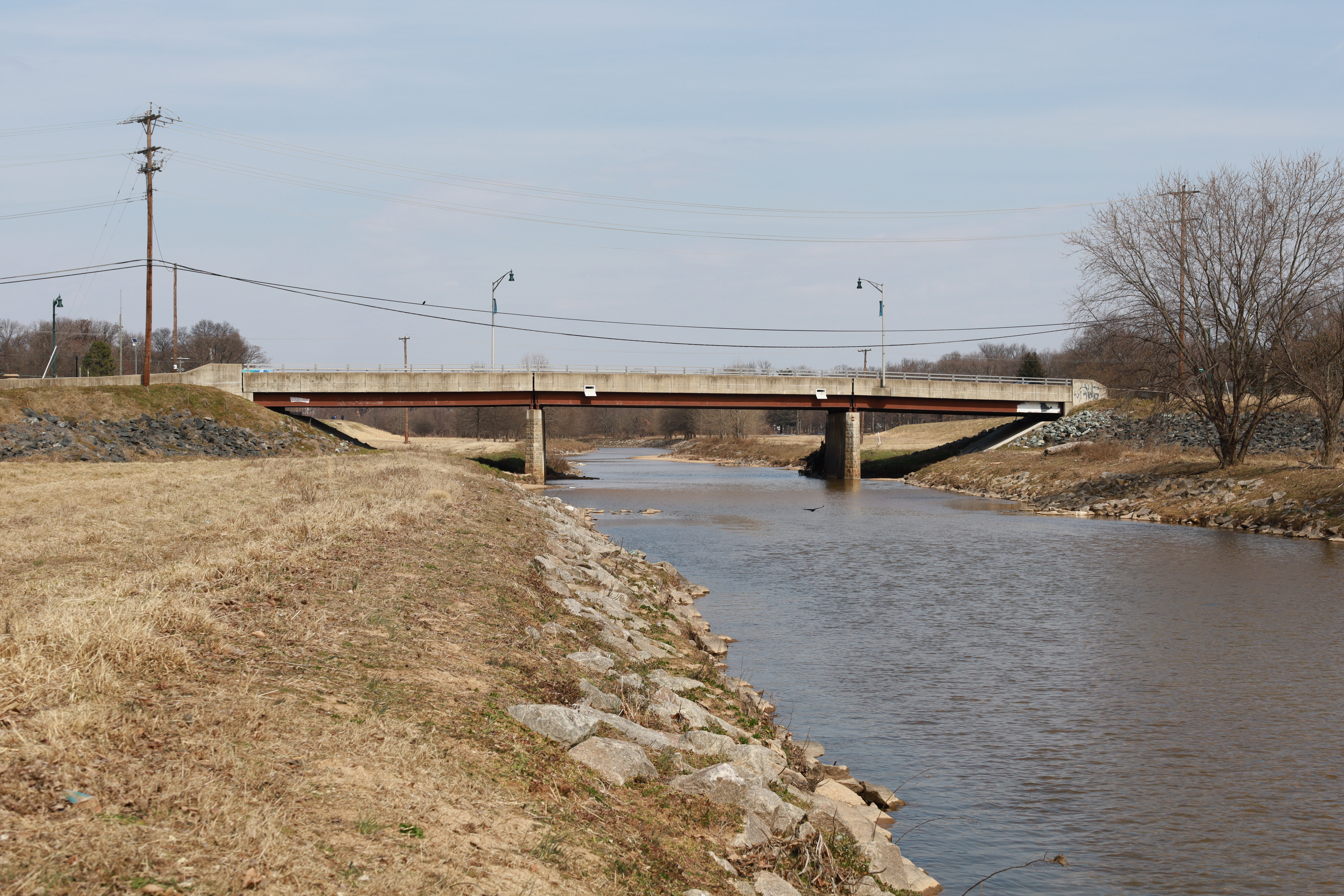
- A bridge crosses the Northeast Branch in Edmonston.

- Flag Seal

- Location of Edmonston, Maryland
- Coordinates: 38°57′3″N 76°56′0″W
- Country: United States of America
- State: Maryland
- County: Prince George's
- Incorporated: 1924

Government
  - Mayor: Julio (Alex) Maltez

Area
  - Total: 0.42 sq mi (1.09 km^{2})
  - Land: 0.41 sq mi (1.06 km^{2})
  - Water: 0.012 sq mi (0.03 km^{2})
- Elevation: 20 ft (6 m)

Population (2020)
  - Total: 1,617
  - Density: 3,959.2/sq mi (1,528.66/km^{2})
- Time zone: UTC-5 (Eastern (EST))
  - Summer (DST): UTC-4 (EDT)
- ZIP code: 20781
- Area codes: 301, 240
- FIPS code: 24-25425
- GNIS feature ID: 0597374
- Website: www.edmonstonmd.gov

Edmonston is a town in Prince George's County, Maryland, United States. As of the 2020 census, the town population was 1,617.

The community is located 2.5 miles (4.0 km) from Washington, D.C. Edmonston's ZIP code is 20781.

== History ==
The present-day Edmonston area probably acquired its name from Edmonston Road, the main road running along its southeast border, which was named for the Edmonston family who owned a great deal of land in the area. Members had been active in local Revolutionary War effort and were descendants of the Family Edmonstone of Duntreath Castle, Scotland.

The first modern settlers of the community were Adam Francis Plummer and his wife Emily Saunders Arnold Plummer, who the powerful Calvert family had enslaved on the Riversdale Plantation in present-day Riverdale Park. After the Civil War, Adam Plummer purchased ten acres of land for $1000, south of the plantation and sought out and recovered family members that had been sold during slavery to deep south plantations, thus establishing the settlement. A skilled horticulturalist, Plummer named the settlement Mt. Rose after his favorite plant and copious rose gardens. Notably, Adam Plummer kept a diary as an enslaved person which today is the only known living slave diary and is a featured exhibit of the Smithsonian Institution's Anacostia Community Museum.

Two subdivisions that would later comprise the town of Edmonston were platted in 1903: East Hyattsville and Palestine. The eastern section was developed in 1903 by J. Harris Rogers on two parcels of land he purchased in the 1880s and 1890s. Rogers platted 70 acres (280,000 m^{2}) into a subdivision of more than 170 lots known as East Hyattsville. The western half began with the subdivision of Dr. Charles A. Wells. Wells purchased the 90-acre (360,000 m^{2}) Palestine Farm from Benjamin Franklin Guy in 1878 and 1879 and continued the farm's dairy operations until 1903. That year, 25 of the farm's acres were subdivided into 62 building lots of various sizes. Within the first decade, 55 houses were constructed in both subdivisions, and many remain today. The earliest buildings were simple vernacular buildings such as the "I" house that were later adapted to the constraints of the narrow suburban building lot.

In the late 19th century, a pumping station in the Palestine subdivision supplied water to the city of Hyattsville. In 1920, operations were taken over by the Washington Suburban Sanitary Commission. Also in the Palestine subdivision was the first school to serve the future town of Edmonston. Constructed in 1915, the building has undergone several additions and alterations.

After World War I, East Hyattsville and Palestine residents began a movement toward incorporation to improve services. Compared to the established Hyattsville, incorporated in 1886, East Hyattsville contained more working class residents, more modest houses, and more immigrants. When incorporating in 1924, the residents chose a name that would give the town an identity independent from Hyattsville and chose "Edmonston" after a major north-south road adjacent to the town. By 1924, there were several hundred residents; at 49th Avenue and Decatur Street, there was a small neighborhood center with a few stores and a post office. Only the small grocery store remains today. The first items on the agenda for the new municipality were street paving and lighting, construction of a concrete bridge across the Anacostia River, and arrangement with the fledgling Washington Suburban Sanitary Commission to bring water and sewer pipes into the town.

Edmonston's mayor in 1927 was Kinjiro Matsudaira, the grandson of a Japanese feudal lord. His election received attention in the Philadelphia press at the time with the somewhat inaccurate lead, "Japanese Elected Mayor of American City for the First Time in History." His father, Tadaatsu, came to the United States in 1872 to study and stayed to marry an American woman and pursue a distinguished career in civil engineering. Kinjiro Matsudaira, born in Pennsylvania in 1885, was elected Mayor of Edmonston for a second time in 1943, during World War II.

In 1925, an undeveloped part of the original Palestine subdivision was platted as the Funkhouser subdivision. The land was divided into 40 lots, and Robert Funkhouser constructed a small bungalow on each. The houses were completed in 1926 and quickly sold. Throughout the 1930s and 1940s, development consisted of sporadic house construction on vacant lots within the established subdivisions. After World War II, the Edmonston Terrace subdivision was constructed, consisting of an organized development of 41 nearly identical two-story, brick side-gable houses. Residential construction during the 1950s and 1960s returned to infill. Also constructed during the 1960s was the Fountain Park apartment complex.

From 2003 to 2006, Edmonston struggled with a series of floods resulting from high volumes of stormwater and the now inadequate flood pumping station. The Town successfully advocated Prince George's County Government for a new state-of-the-art $6 million facility, which received recognition for its utilization of three massive Archimedes' screws, a flood pumping technology developed by the eponymous ancient Greek mathematician rarely utilized on such a scale in the United States.

In November 2009, the Town broke ground on its "Green Street" in a ceremony attended by US Environmental Protection Agency (EPA) Administrator Lisa Jackson. The completed project was dedicated in November 2010 with significant national attention for pioneering the combination of low impact development and complete street principles. The street features LED streetlights, a green power purchase agreement, elevated crosswalks, traffic calming bump-out raingardens and permeable pavement bike lanes that together capture nearly 100% of stormwater runoff. The project has received various awards and recognition, including an "Innovations in Infrastructure" award by the White House's Champions for Change Program and sparked the adoption of policies requiring complete green streets in municipalities nationwide.

== Government ==
Edmonston's town hall and police station

The Edmonston municipal government consists of four members of council and a mayor who, beginning in May 2008, are elected to three-year terms. Elected positions are essentially volunteer and are paid a small stipend for expenses. The structure of the government is a mostly "strong" mayor system, meaning that the mayor has administrative control over government operations and presents their budget each year for adoption. However, the appointment of department heads must meet the council's approval. Edmonston's mayor sits as president of the council, though can only vote to break a tie on the council.

=== Elected officials ===
As of June 2026, Julio Maltez is the mayor of Edmonston, having been elected in 2026. Members of the town council include Michelle Bonilla, Cameron Sherr, Monique Burton, and Walter Doyle.

=== Appointed officials ===
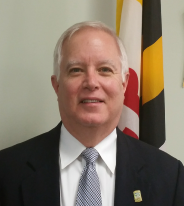
Rodney Barnes
Town Administrator

== Adjacent cities and towns ==
- Bladensburg (southeast)
- Riverdale Park (north)
- Hyattsville (northwest)

== Geography ==
Edmonston is located at 38°57′3″N 76°56′0″W (38.950793, -76.933423).

According to the United States Census Bureau, the town has a total area of 0.40 square miles (1.04 km^{2}), of which 0.39 square miles (1.01 km^{2}) is land and 0.01 square miles (0.03 km^{2}) is water.

== Demographics ==
Historical population
Census	Pop.	Note	%±
1930	717		—
1940	934		30.3%
1950	1,190		27.4%
1960	1,197		0.6%
1970	1,441		20.4%
1980	1,109		−23.0%
1990	851		−23.3%
2000	959		12.7%
2010	1,445		50.7%
2020	1,617		11.9%
U.S. Decennial Census

=== Racial and ethnic composition ===
Edmonston town, Maryland – Racial and ethnic composition Note: the US Census treats Hispanic/Latino as an ethnic category. This table excludes Latinos from the racial categories and assigns them to a separate category. Hispanics/Latinos may be of any race.
Race / Ethnicity (NH = Non-Hispanic)	Pop 2000	Pop 2010	Pop 2020	% 2000	% 2010	% 2020
White alone (NH)	353	236	179	36.81%	16.33%	11.07%
Black or African American alone (NH)	390	458	387	40.67%	31.70%	23.93%
Native American or Alaska Native alone (NH)	4	4	3	0.42%	0.28%	0.19%
Asian alone (NH)	13	28	10	1.36%	1.94%	0.62%
Native Hawaiian or Pacific Islander alone (NH)	0	0	2	0.00%	0.00%	0.12%
Other race alone (NH)	1	1	16	0.10%	0.07%	0.99%
Mixed race or Multiracial (NH)	14	20	59	1.46%	1.38%	3.65%
Hispanic or Latino (any race)	184	698	961	19.19%	48.30%	59.43%
Total	959	1,445	1,617	100.00%	100.00%	100.00%

=== 2020 census ===
As of the 2020 census, Edmonston had a population of 1,617. The median age was 33.3 years. 27.8% of residents were under the age of 18 and 8.2% of residents were 65 years of age or older. For every 100 females there were 102.1 males, and for every 100 females age 18 and over there were 99.1 males age 18 and over.

100.0% of residents lived in urban areas, while 0.0% lived in rural areas.

There were 467 households in Edmonston, of which 50.7% had children under the age of 18 living in them. Of all households, 45.0% were married-couple households, 21.8% were households with a male householder and no spouse or partner present, and 24.2% were households with a female householder and no spouse or partner present. About 19.3% of all households were made up of individuals and 6.6% had someone living alone who was 65 years of age or older.

There were 481 housing units, of which 2.9% were vacant. The homeowner vacancy rate was 0.8% and the rental vacancy rate was 1.9%.

=== 2010 census ===
As of the census of 2010, there were 1,445 people, 445 households, and 305 families residing in the town. The population density was 3,705.1 inhabitants per square mile (1,430.5/km^{2}). There were 483 housing units at an average density of 1,238.5 per square mile (478.2/km^{2}). The racial makeup of the town was 32.5% African American, 27.8% White, 0.6% Native American, 2.1% Asian, 0.3% Pacific Islander, 33.2% from other races, and 3.6% from two or more races. Hispanic or Latino of any race were 48.3% of the population.

There were 445 households, of which 44.5% had children under the age of 18 living with them, 43.4% were married couples living together, 14.2% had a female householder with no husband present, 11.0% had a male householder with no wife present, and 31.5% were non-families. 23.1% of all households were made up of individuals, and 5.3% had someone living alone who was 65 years of age or older. The average household size was 3.25 and the average family size was 3.73.

The median age in the town was 31. 28.1% of residents were under 18, 11.3% were between 18 and 24, 31.5% were 25 to 44, 23.6% were 45 to 64, and 5.6% were 65 years of age or older. The town's gender makeup was 52.1% male and 47.9% female.

=== 2000 census ===
As of the census of 2000, there were 959 people, 303 households, and 216 families residing in the town. The population density was 2,591.0 inhabitants per square mile (1,000.4/km^{2}). There were 330 housing units at an average density of 891.6 per square mile (344.2/km^{2}). The racial makeup of the town was 43.59% White, 41.08% African American, 0.52% Native American, 1.36% Asian, 10.32% from other races, and 3.13% from two or more races. Hispanic or Latino of any race were 19.19% of the population.

There were 303 households, out of which 37.3% had children under the age of 18 living with them, 47.2% were married couples living together, 16.2% had a female householder with no husband present, and 28.7% were non-families. 21.5% of all households were made up of individuals, and 7.3% had someone living alone who was 65 years of age or older. The average household size was 3.17 and the average family size was 3.69.

In the town, the population was spread out, with 31.0% under the age of 18, 8.4% from 18 to 24, 31.7% from 25 to 44, 21.2% from 45 to 64, and 7.7% who were 65 years of age or older. The median age was 34 years. For every 100 females, there were 94.9 males. For every 100 females age 18 and over, there were 96.4 males.

The median income for a household in the town was $52,813, and the median income for a family was $56,875. Males had a median income of $35,966 versus $33,846 for females. The per capita income for the town was $19,830. About 1.9% of families and 6.0% of the population were below the poverty line, including 1.0% of those under age 18 and 8.4% of those age 65 or over.

== Transportation ==
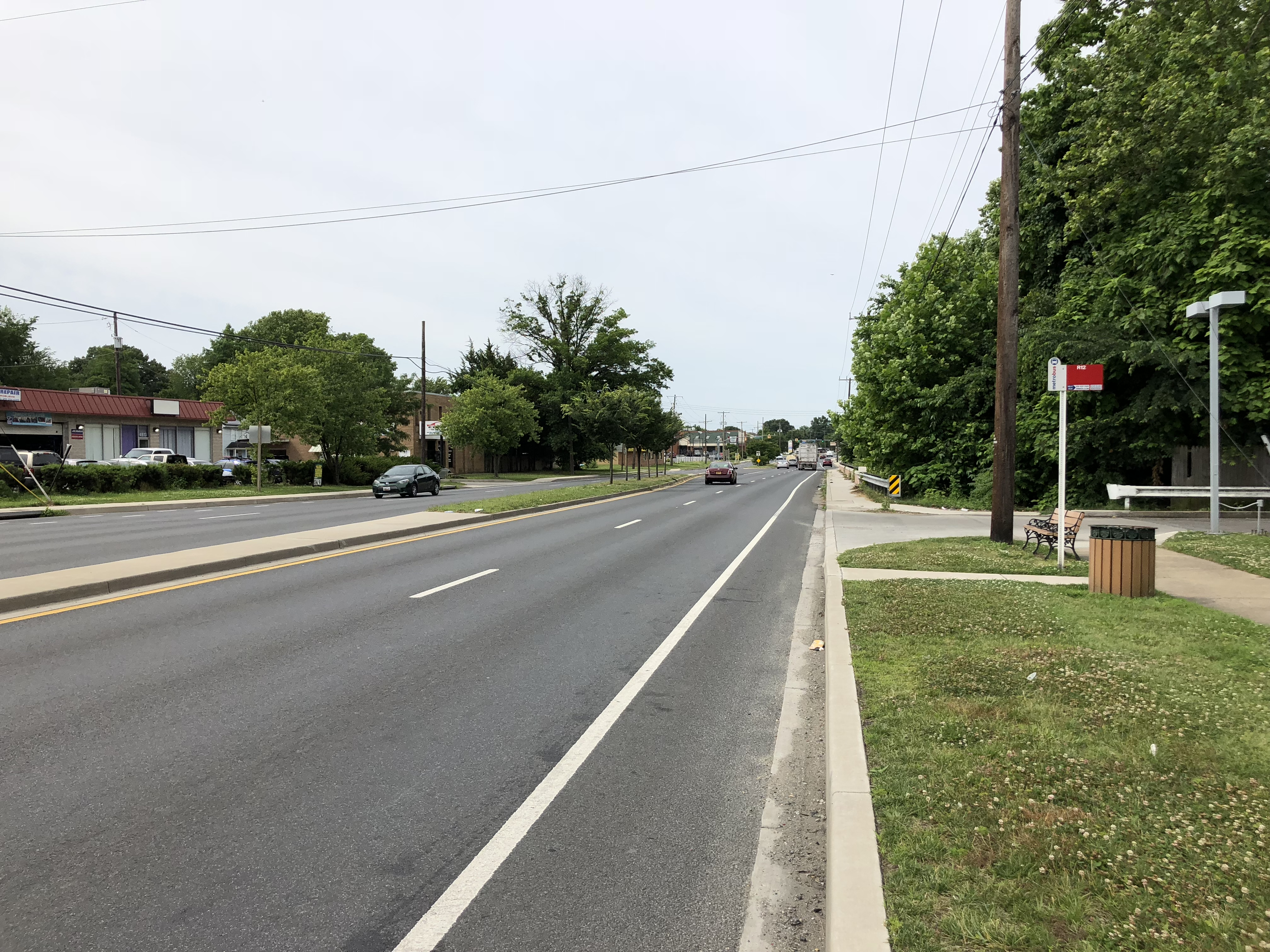
MD 201 southbound in Edmonston

The only signed state highway serving Edmonston is Maryland Route 201, Kenilworth Avenue. From Edmonston, MD 201 extends south to Washington, D.C., and north to Interstate 95/Interstate 495, the Capital Beltway.

== Education ==
Edmonston is zoned to Prince George's County Public Schools. Multiple schools have sections of the town in their attendance boundaries:

Elementary schools:

- Riverdale Elementary
- Rogers Heights Elementary School

Middle schools:

- William Wirt Middle School
- Hyattsville Middle School

Bladensburg High School is the sole zoned high school of Edmonston.
