= Ueda Domain =

Ueda Domain 上田藩
- under Tokugawa shogunate Japan
- 1600–1871
- Capital: Ueda Castle
- Area
  - Coordinates: 36.40413°N 138.24427°E
  - Type: Daimyō
- Historical era: Edo period
  - Established: 1600
  - Disestablished: 1871
- Today part of: part of Nagano Prefecture

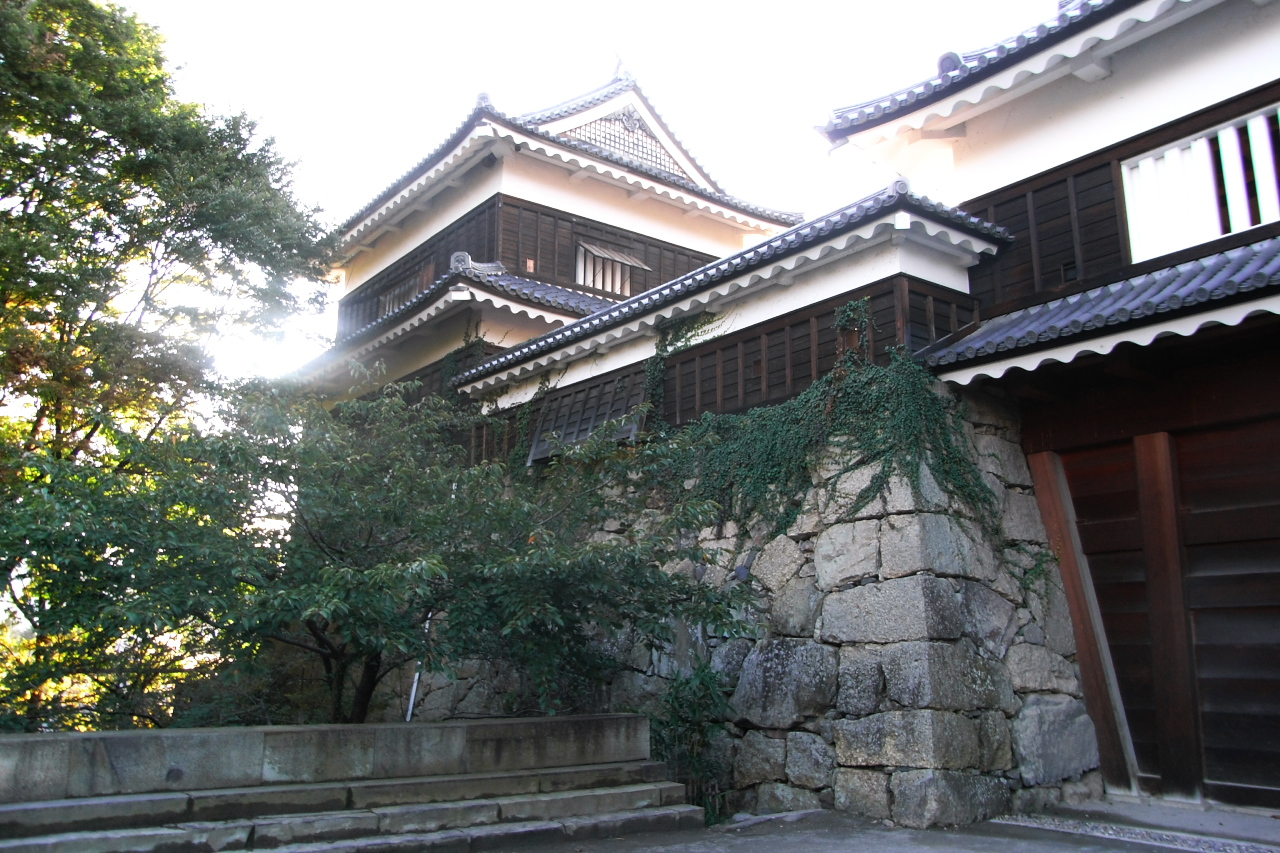
Ueda Castle, administrative centre of Ueda Domain

Ueda Domain (上田藩, Ueda-han) was a feudal domain under the Tokugawa shogunate of Edo period Japan. It is located in Shinano Province, Honshū. The domain was centered at Ueda Castle, located in what is now part of the city of Ueda in Nagano Prefecture.

== History ==
The Sanada clan had ruled Chiisagata District in Shinano Province during the Sengoku period under the Takeda clan and subsequently most of northern Shinano and Kōzuke Province as retainers of Toyotomi Hideyoshi. Ueda Castle was the site of two battles between the Sanada and the Tokugawa clan, notably the Siege of Ueda in 1600 when Sanada Masayuki with a force of 2000 men held off Tokugawa Hidetada's invading force of 38,000 men for so long that they arrived late for then Battle of Sekigahara. Following the establishment of the Tokugawa shogunate, Sanada Nobuyuki was confirmed as daimyō with Ueda Domain, with holdings assessed at 95,000 koku. However, in 1622 the clan was transferred to Matsushiro Domain.

The Sanada were replaced at Ueda by Sengoku Tadamasa, formerly of Komoro Domain, with a reduction to 60,000 koku. However, Tadamasa died in 1628 before his plans to rebuild Ueda castle were realised, and his son Sengoku Tadatoshi became embroiled in a dispute over land surveys. His son, Sengoku Masaakira reduced the domain by giving 2000 koku to his younger brother before he was transferred to Izushi Domain in Tajima Province in 1706.

Ueda Domain was then given to Matsudaira Tadachika, with an assessed kokudaka of 58,000 koku. Matsudaira Tadachika served in many important roles within the administration of Tokugawa Ieshige, including Kyoto shoshidai from 1717 through 1724 and rōjū in 1724, His son, Matsudaira Tadazane, gave 5000 koku to his younger brother, reducing the domain to 53,000 koku. The Matsudaira clan remained in control of the domain to the Meiji restoration.

During the Boshin War, the domain sided with the imperial side, and sent forces to fight in the Battle of Hokuetsu and Battle of Aizu. In July 1871, with the abolition of the han system, Ueda Domain briefly became Ueda Prefecture, and was merged into the newly created Nagano Prefecture. Under the new Meiji government, Matsudaira Tadanari, the last daimyo of Ueda Domain went to study at Rutgers University and was given the kazoku peerage title of shishaku (viscount).

== Bakumatsu period holdings ==
As with most domains in the han system, Ueda Domain consisted of several discontinuous territories calculated to provide the assigned kokudaka, based on periodic cadastral surveys and projected agricultural yields.

- Shinano Province
  - 5 villages in Sarashina District
  - 106 villages in Chiisagata District

== List of daimyō ==
#	Name	Tenure	Courtesy title	Court Rank	kokudaka	Notes
Sanada clan (tozama) 1600-1622
1	Sanada Nobuyuki (真田信之)	1600-1622	Izu-no-kami (伊豆守)	Lower 5th (従五位下)	95,000 koku	to Matsushiro Domain
Sengoku clan (tozama) 1622-1706
1	Sengoku Tadamasa (仙石忠政)	1622-1628	Hyōbu-no-daifu (兵部大輔)	Junior 5th Rank, Lower Grade (従五位下)	60,000 koku	from Komoro Domain
2	Sengoku Masatoshi (仙石政俊)	1628-1669	Echizen-no-kami (越前守)	Junior 5th Rank, Lower Grade (従五位下)	60,000 -> 58,000 koku	
3	Sengoku Masaakira (仙石政明)	1669-1706	Echizen-no-kami (越前守)	Junior 5th Rank, Lower Grade (従五位下)	58,000 koku	to Izushi Domain
Matsudaira clan (Fujii) (fudai) 1706-1871
1	Matsudaira Tadachika (松平忠周)	1706-1728	Iga-no-kami (伊賀守); Jijū (侍従)	Junior 4th Rank, Lower Grade (従四位下)	58,000 koku	from Izushi Domain
2	Matsudaira Tadazane (松平忠愛)	1728-1749	Iga-no-kami (伊賀守)	Junior 5th Rank, Lower Grade (従五位下)	58,000 koku	
3	Matsudaira Tadayori (松平忠順)	1749-1783	Iga-no-kami (伊賀守)	Junior 5th Rank, Lower Grade (従五位下)	58,000 koku	
4	Matsudaira Tadamasa (松平忠済)	1783-1812	Iga-no-kami (伊賀守)	Junior 5th Rank, Lower Grade (従五位下)	58,000 koku	
5	Matsudaira Tadasato (松平忠学)	1816-1830	Iga-no-kami (伊賀守)	Junior 5th Rank, Lower Grade (従五位下)	58,000->53,000 koku	
6	Matsudaira Tadakata (松平忠固)	1830-1858	Iga-no-kami (伊賀守); Jijū (侍従)	Junior 4th Rank, Lower Grade (従四位下)	53,000 koku	
7	Matsudaira Tadanari (松平忠礼)	1858-1871	Iga-no-kami (伊賀守)	Junior 5th Rank, Lower Grade (従五位下)	53,000 koku	

== See also ==
List of Han
