= Wasian =

Term for individuals of Asian and White descent

Wasians are people of mixed White and East Asian descent. The term Wasian is a colloquial portmanteau of both "White" and "Asian". Originating in the 2020s, the term especially gained traction in 2026 due to visibility of celebrities like Alysa Liu and Hudson Williams following commonplace usage by Generation Z on social media.

== Definition ==
The term is a portmanteau of "Asian" and "White." The term is usually defined as referring to people of mixed White and East Asian heritage. In the United States, "Asian" is usually understood as "East Asian".

Historically, other terms—like hāfu, hapa, Amerasian, and Eurasian—have been used to refer to people of White and Asian descent. Similar terms have been coined for people of other mixed ethnic backgrounds, such as Blasian ("Black" and "Asian").

== History ==
As TikTok became popular with younger generations in the 2020s, the platform spawned the trend #WasianCheck, which led to a proliferation of content about the experiences of people who are half East Asian and half White. Sociologist Rebecca Chiyoko King-O'Riain wrote in 2022 that the term "has emerged relatively quickly largely spread and institutionalised through social media interactions on digital platforms like TikTok" and supplanted terms like hapa (a word originating in Hawaiʻi). The popularity of Wasian in the 2020s has been associated more generally "the economic rise of Asia" and "greater international interest in Asian narratives".

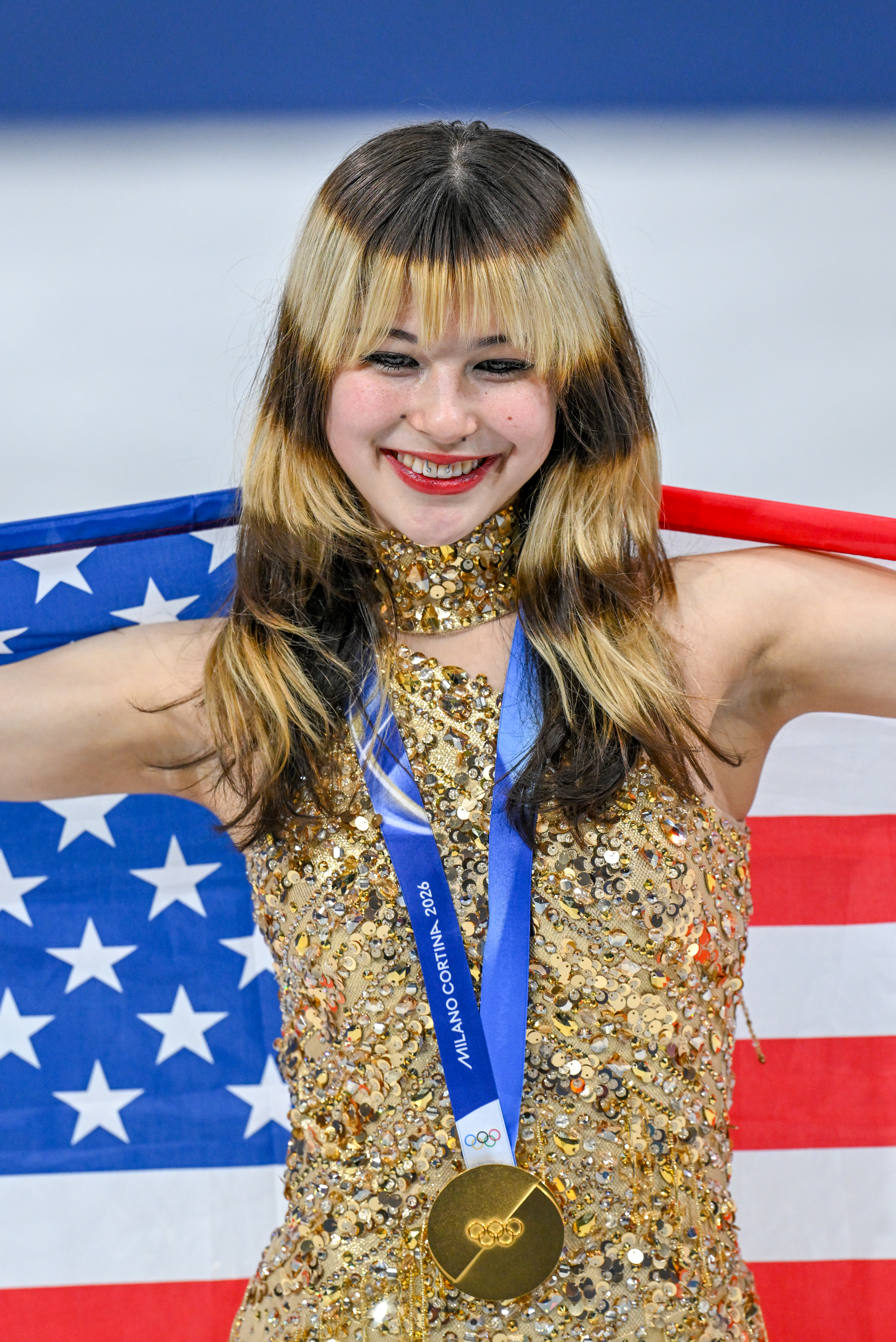
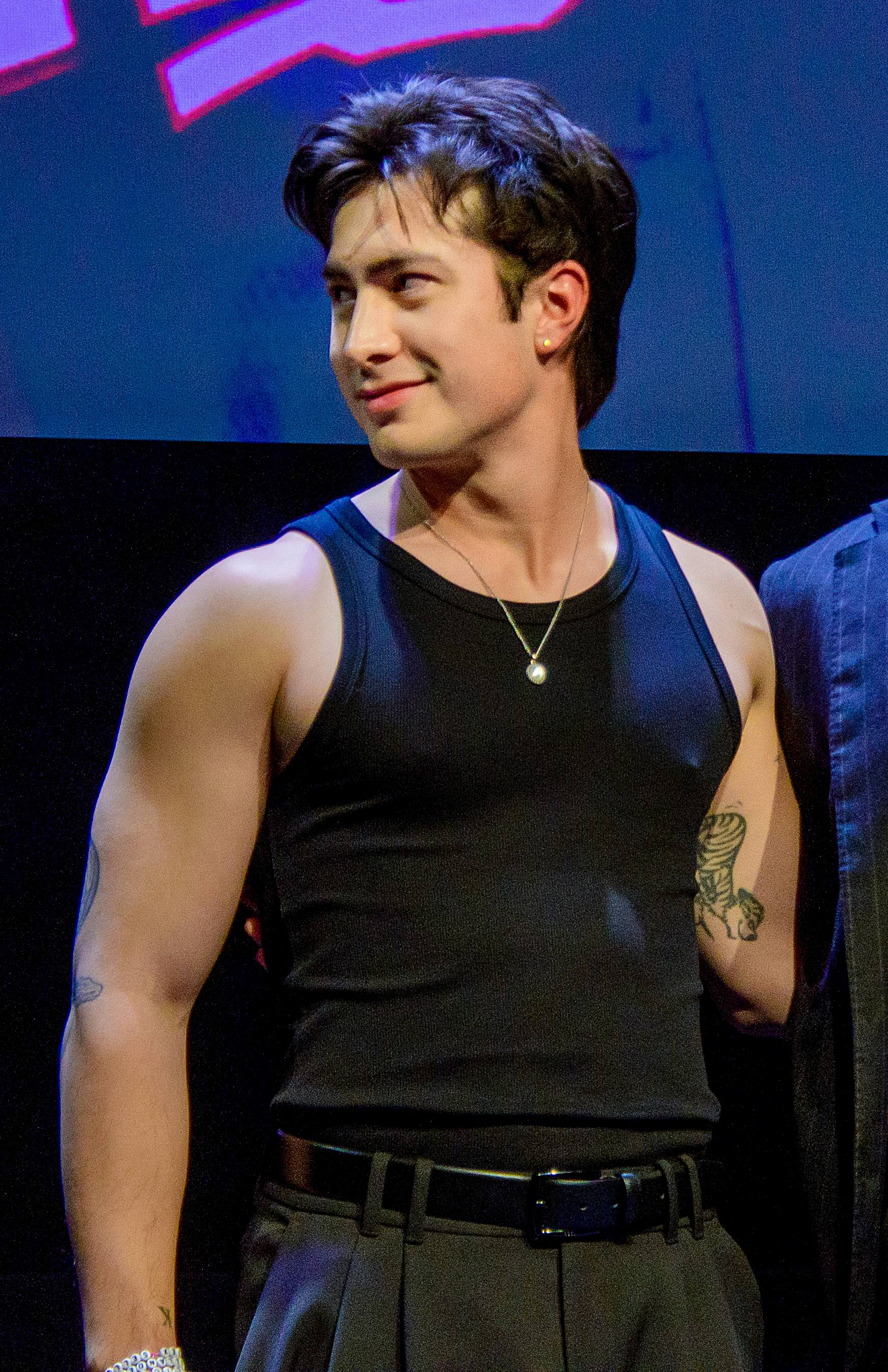
Media commentators have credited the popularity of American athlete Alysa Liu and Canadian actor Hudson Williams, among others, for increasing representation of people of mixed White and Asian heritage.

Keanu Reeves has been cited as an early point of Wasian representation in American media. In 2026, NPR's It's Been a Minute podcast reported on the increase in Wasian representation due to Alysa Liu's return to ice-skating at the 2026 Winter Olympics and Hudson Williams' role in Heated Rivalry. While the hosts acknowledged that "there are different waves of Wasians in U.S. history," tracing a history of the hapa term and White–Asian intermarriage in the twentieth century, they stated that "the one we're in right now is the most culturally powerful, let's say, of all of them."

The South China Morning Post noted that Liu and Williams, as well as Lola Tung, Eileen Gu, and Megan Skiendiel, "have all been the focus of heavy media attention" in 2026, thus leading to newly popular discourse that "has frequently fixated on their racial identity." The Huffington Post stated that the rising popularity of the term in 2026 is "an example of how attitudes around mixed-race identities are evolving". CNN noted that the term became popularized alongside a growing fascination with Asian culture in the west.

Popularity of the term spread beyond the United States including to Korea where Jeon Somi, Vernon, and Nancy are popular Wasian K-pop stars.

=== Meetups ===
'Wasian' meetups were held in Central Park, New York City and Dolores Park, San Francisco in May 2026. The first meetup, the 2026 Wasian Gathering, was a "mass convening of the half Asians" that occurred May 10, 2026 in Sheep Meadow in Central Park, drawing a crowd of more than 3,000.

The gatherings reportedly served as a third place for mixed race people who often felt excluded from white or Asian-dominated spaces. The events sparked extensive discussion on social media about "Wasian" identity and inclusion, the term Wasian itself, and inclusivity in the half-Asian community. Some mixed Asians, including Mad Tsai and Quentin Nguyen-Duy, criticized the events for allegedly excluding mixed Asians of non-white and non-East Asian descent.

== In culture and society ==
- "Madwoman", song by Laufey, a singer-songwriter of Icelandic and Chinese descent, with a music video starring only Wasian celebrities
- Wasia Project—English pop band consisting of two half-Chinese siblings

== See also ==
- List of Wasians
