= Dominique Provost-Chalkley =

British-Canadian actor (born 1990)

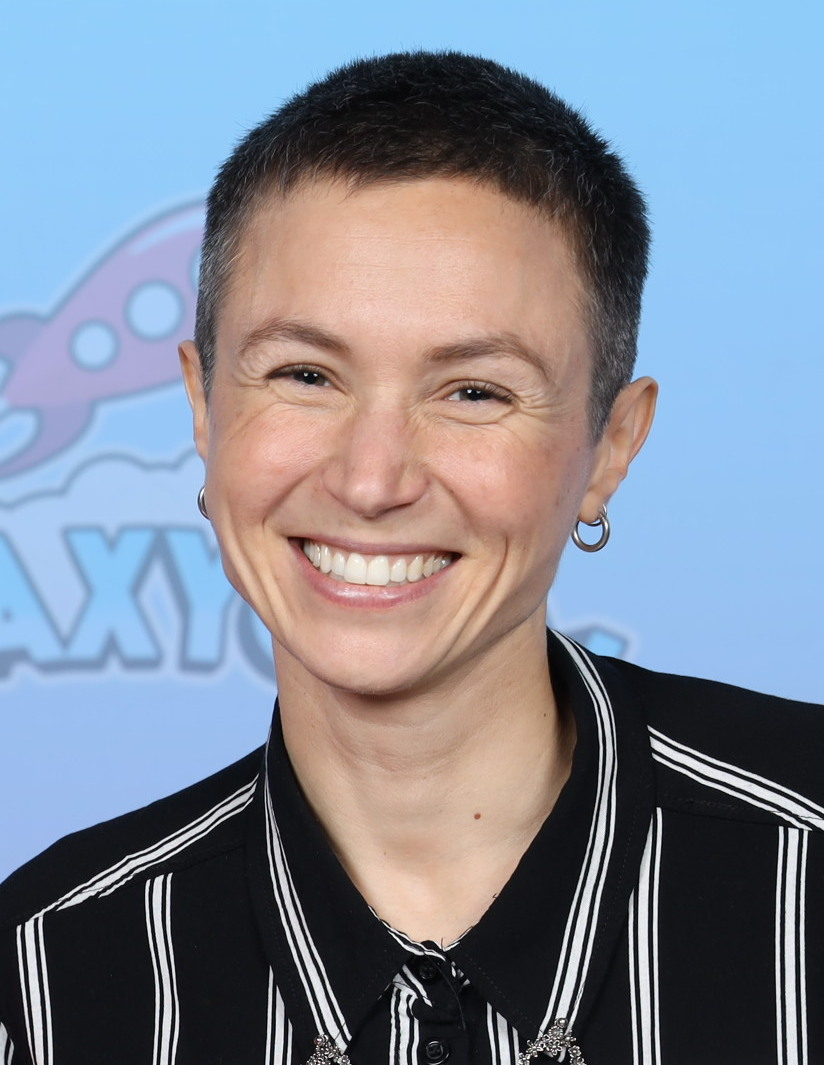
- Provost-Chalkley in 2023
- Born: 24 March 1990 (age 36); Bristol, England
- Other name: Dom P-C
- Occupations: Actor, activist, singer/songwriter
- Years active: 2008–present
- Known for: Acting in TV and films, Environmental activism
- Notable work: Wynonna Earp

Dominique Provost-Chalkley (born 24 March 1990) is a British-Canadian actor, best known for their role as Waverly Earp on the television series Wynonna Earp.

== Career ==
They began dancing at the age of four and, at the age of 16, began training as an actor and singer at the Laine Theatre Arts School.

Provost-Chalkley began appearing on television in 2008 as a dancer in the ITV series Britannia High. In 2010, they were an alternate in the West End hit musical Dirty Dancing. In 2012, they starred as Vanya in the British thriller film The Seasoning House and were featured in an episode of the E4's sitcom The Midnight Beast. In 2015, they played Zrinka in the Hollywood blockbuster film Avengers: Age of Ultron.

On stage, they played Holly in Viva Forever!, a jukebox musical about the Spice Girls that took place in West End from 2012 to 2013.

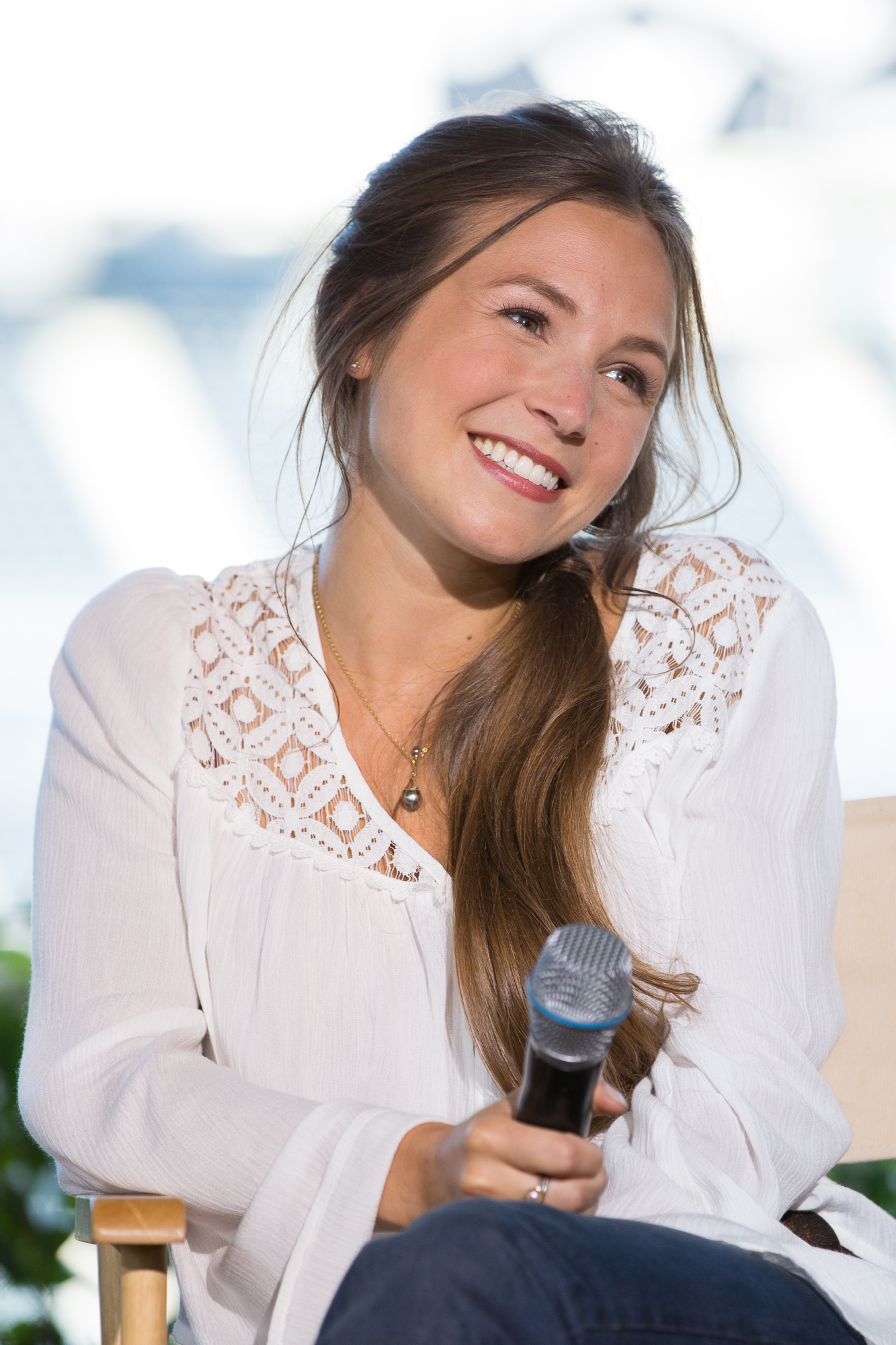
Provost-Chalkley in 2016

In 2016, they began playing Waverly Earp on the Canadian-American television series Wynonna Earp, a performance for which they received considerable fan attention; they have been noted for their performance of a queer character by the LGBT community. They originally auditioned for the lead role. In 2018, they, along with the cast of Wynonna Earp, received the People's Choice Award for best Sci-Fi show. The show won as a write-in candidate due to the show's fandom known as "Earpers". They have also played a variety of guest roles in other television series, including on Murdoch Mysteries (2016) and 12 Monkeys (2017)

In 2017, they played a supporting role in The Carmilla Movie, a feature film based on the popular web series Carmilla.

In 2019, they played the role of Sue in the queer holiday movie, Season of Love, where they performed a Billy Steinberg song, "Lift Your Spirit Up".

Wrote songs "Pride Liberates" and "Keeping Me Safe" which are sung by singer/songwriter and friend, Emy Taliana. Both songs can be heard on Emy Taliana's album, "Everything Is Love."

== Personal life ==
The child of Danielle Provost and Christopher Chalkley, an artist and activist, manager, founder and president of the People's Republic of Stokes Croft (PRSC), a collective that aims to enhance the neighborhood with art and local artists, Provost-Chalkley was born in Bristol, England. They are also Canadian, due to their Quebecois mother.

Provost-Chalkley came out, stating "I am queer. I am into ALL humans", on 24 March 2020, their 30th birthday, through an initiative called "Rainbow Waves" spawned from their organisation Start The Wave.

They are also the founder of “Start the Wave”, a non-profit organization. They have Raynaud syndrome and dyslexia.

In 2021, they came out as non-binary and genderfluid.

== Work ==
=== Film ===
Year	Title	Role	Notes
2012	The Seasoning House	Vanya	
2015	Avengers: Age of Ultron	Zrinka	Also uncredited work as one of Scarlett Johansson's stunt doubles
2016	Cannonball	Marley, age 16	Short film
2017	Beautiful Devils	Emmy	
2017	The Carmilla Movie	Elle Sheridan	
2017	The Curse of Buckout Road	Cleo Harris	
2018	Eat Jeremy	Julie	Short film
2019	Season of Love	Sue	
2021	Like a House on Fire	Therese	
2024	Wynonna Earp: Vengeance	Waverly Earp	tubi Original

=== Television ===
Year	Title	Role	Notes
2008	Britannia High	Ensemble dancer	9 episodes
2012	The Midnight Beast	Jenny	Episode: "Boyband"
2016–2021	Wynonna Earp	Waverly Earp	Main role, 49 episodes
2016	Murdoch Mysteries	Elizabeth Atherly	Episodes: "Great Balls of Fire: Part 1 & Part 2"
2017	12 Monkeys	Arianna	Episode: "Mother"
2017	NeverKnock	Grace	Television film
2018	Separated at Birth	Terri Marshall	Television film

=== Stage ===
Year	Title	Role	Notes
2010–2011	Dirty Dancing	Baby (alternate)	Aldwych Theatre
2012–2013	Viva Forever!	Holly	Piccadilly Theatre

== Awards ==
Year	Association	Category	Result
2019	Canadian Screen Awards	Audience Choice Award	Won
