= Lost Episode Festival Toronto =

Canadian film festival

Lost Episode Fest Toronto
- Official LEFT logo
- Status: Active
- Genre: Film festival
- Location: Toronto
- Country: Canada
- Organizer: Johnny Larocque
- Website: http://www.lostepisodefest.com/

Lost Episode Festival Toronto (also known as LEFT) is a publicly attended film festival showcasing horror, sci-fi, action, television, cult cinema, and indie film held annually in Toronto, Ontario, Canada. The festival screens a variety of feature-length and short-films as well as parody commercials and movie trailers from around the world including North America, Australia, and Europe. The festival also hosts the 50 Hour Film Competition - a time based film challenge where filmmakers are given just over two days to create a short film from concept to completion using a provided genre, prop, line of dialogue, and character.

== Past Festivals ==
=== LEFT 2013 ===
LEFT 2013 showcased 14 films, 1 feature film presentation and 13 short films. Notable films screened at the festival included BioCop by cult producers Astron-6, Channel 101 series Karate P.I., and the exclusive Canadian theatrical premiere of Star Trek Continues. The inaugural festival was held June 1–2, 2013, at the Bloor Cinema in Toronto, Ontario, Canada.

=== LEFT 2014 ===
LEFT 2014 showcased 9 films, 2 feature film presentations, and 7 short films. Notable films screened at the festival included the exclusive Canadian premieres of the films ANNA (a.k.a. MINDSCAPE), PATRICK: Evil Awakens, and NAKED ZOMBIE GIRL. The 2nd annual festival was held July 5–6, 2014 at the Bloor Cinema in Toronto, Ontario, Canada.

=== LEFT 2015 ===
LEFT 2015 showcased 28 films, 10 feature film presentations, and 18 short films. Notable films screened at the festival included the Canadian premiere of Inner Demon, Blood Punch, Lost After Dark, The Shells, and The House on Pine Street; Toronto premiere of Some Kind of Hate, Slumlord, and Bunny the Killer Thing. The 3rd annual festival was held August 7–9, 2015 at the Carlton Cinema in Toronto, Ontario, Canada.

=== LEFT 2016 ===
LEFT 2016 showcased 50 films, 10 feature film presentations, and 40 short films. Notable films screened at the festival included the Canadian premiere of Daylight's End, This Giant Papier Mache Boulder Is Actually Really Heavy, Vampyres, Sun Choke, Dry Blood, and Cord; Toronto premiere of Under the Shadow, The Barn, The Greasy Strangler, and Bad Blood - The Movie. The 4th annual festival was held August 5–7, 2016 at the Carlton Cinema in Toronto, Ontario, Canada.

=== LEFT 2017 ===
LEFT 2017 showcased 51 films, 10 feature film presentations, and 41 short films. Notable films screened at the festival included the Canadian theatrical premiere of Cherry 2000 and El ataúd de cristal (The Glass Coffin), and the Toronto premieres of 68 Kill, Sequence Break, Replace, Dead Shack, It Stains The Sands Red, and Ron Goossens Low Budget Stuntman. The 5th annual festival was held August 10–13, 2017 at the Carlton Cinema in Toronto, Ontario, Canada.

== See also ==
- List of fantastic and horror film festivals
- B movie
- Film festival

== Notes ==
- "Video interview with LEFT founder Johnny Larocque on the show InnerSpace" (Space)
- "MOVIE LOVERS! DON’T BE LEFT OUT!" (filmarmy)
- "The Lost Episode Festival Toronto" (BlogUT)
