= The Silent Hour =

2024 film by Brad Anderson

- Theatrical release poster
- Directed by: Brad Anderson
- Written by: Dan Hall
- Produced by: Eric Paquette
- Starring: Joel Kinnaman; Sandra Mae Frank; Mekhi Phifer; Mark Strong
- Cinematography: Daniel Aranyó
- Edited by: Matt Lyon
- Music by: Anton Sanko
- Production companies: AGC Studios; Meridian Pictures
- Distributed by: Republic Pictures
- Release date: October 11, 2024
- Running time: 99 minutes
- Country: United States
- Languages: English; American Sign Language
- Box office: $322,064

The Silent Hour is a 2024 American crime thriller film directed by Brad Anderson, written by Dan Hall, and starring Joel Kinnaman, Sandra Mae Frank, Mekhi Phifer, and Mark Strong.

The film was released in the United States on October 11, 2024, by Republic Pictures.

== Plot ==
Sixteen months after an on-the-job accident leaves him with deteriorating hearing loss, Boston police detective, Frank Shaw, is drawn into a life-threatening conflict. Two drug dealers have been killed, and the only witness is a deaf photographer, Ava Fremont.

Frank wasn't supposed to be on this case. In fact, when his former partner, Detective Doug Slater, finds Frank nursing a beer in his local bar, Frank is contemplating retirement. Slater pulls him in with a favour: the interpreter is unavailable, could Frank come with him to interview Ava? A reluctant 'yes' leads both men to Ava's derelict apartment building where Frank muddles through sign language and Ava lip reads. Not only has she witnessed the murder, she's recorded it. Frank and Slater take her phone as evidence and reassure her that they'll catch the perpetrators.

Frank leaves the interview cautiously hopeful that he can still work as a policeman, only to realise he left his phone, which controls the volume on his hearing aids, in Ava's apartment. When he returns, his skill and intuition as a cop is put to the test, as the murderers have found Ava.

After shooting one of the gunmen, Frank and Ava escape into the dilapidated apartment block. While they attempt to flee or get help, it's revealed that the gang, led by Lynch, are a team of crooks and corrupt cops determined to kill Ava to prevent her from testifying. What ensues is a tense standoff within the apartment complex.

== Cast ==
- Joel Kinnaman as Detective Frank Shaw
- Sandra Mae Frank as Ava Fremont
- Mekhi Phifer as Mason Lynch
- Mark Strong as Detective Doug Slater
- Michael Eklund as Angel Flores
- Djinda Kane as the medic
- Katrina Lupi as Sam Shaw

== Production ==
In October 2022, it was announced that Kinnaman was cast in the film. In November 2022, it was announced that Strong was cast in the film. In January 2023, it was announced that Frank and Phifer were added to the cast.

In February 2024, it was announced that Republic Pictures acquired North American and Asian pay TV distribution rights to the film, which was filmed in Malta and Toronto in 2023. In April 2023, filming took place in Downtown Kitchener, Ontario.

== Release ==
The film was released in the United States on October 11, 2024.

== Reception ==
The film has a 67% rating on Rotten Tomatoes based on 21 reviews, with an average rating of 5.7/10.
