= Shook (2021 film) =

2021 American horror film

- DVD cover
- Directed by: Jennifer Harrington
- Written by: Jennifer Harrington
- Story by: Alesia Glidewell; Jennifer Harrington
- Produced by: Tara L. Craig
- Production company: Squid Farm Productions
- Distributed by: Shudder
- Release date: February 18, 2021
- Running time: 88 minutes
- Country: United States
- Language: English

Shook is a 2021 American horror thriller film written and directed by Jennifer Harrington based on a story by Alesia Glidewell and Jennifer Harrington. It was produced by Tara L. Craig and Squid Farm Productions. Shook premiered on Shudder on February 18, 2021.

== Plot ==
When Mia, a social media influencer, becomes the target of an online terror campaign, she has to solve a series of games to prevent people she cares about from getting murdered. But is it real? Or is it just a game at her expense?

== Cast ==
- Daisye Tutor as Mia
- Emily Goss as Nicole
- Nicola Posener as Lani
- Grant Rosenmeyer as Kellan
- Stefanie Simbari as Jade

== Reception ==
On the review aggregator website Rotten Tomatoes, 53% of 15 critics' reviews are positive, with an average rating of 5.1/10. Metacritic, which uses a weighted average, assigned the film a score of 53 out of 100, based on 5 critics, indicating "mixed or average" reviews.
