= Matthew Currie Holmes =

Canadian actor, screenwriter, producer, and director (born 1974)

Matthew Currie
- Born: Matthew Joseph Currie; May 26, 1974 (age 52); North Bay, Ontario, Canada
- Occupations: Actor, Screenwriter, Director, Producer
- Years active: 2000–present
- Website: http://www.matthewcurrieholmes.com

Matthew Currie (born May 26, 1974) is a Canadian actor, screenwriter, producer, and director who has appeared in over 40 film and television projects.

== Filmography ==
=== As an actor and producer ===
Currie Holmes has appeared in the Canadian television series Godiva's and Edgemont. His feature film credits include Jet Boy (2001), Dawn of the Dead (2004), The Fog (2005), Firewall (2006), and Wrong Turn 2: Dead End (2007). Currie Holmes produced and starred in the short film My Charlotte (2009), which was chosen as an official Cinéfondation selection at the Cannes Film Festival.

Currie Holmes won the Leo award for Best Supporting Performance By A Male in a Dramatic Series in 2005, and was again nominated for the award in 2006.

=== As a writer and director ===
Currie Holmes has written and story edited dozens of projects for producers and directors in both Hollywood and Canada. Most recently, he co-wrote the action/horror film Demonology with X-men, X2, and Watchmen scribe David Hayter, which as of December 2011, is in development.

Currie Holmes has recently joined forces with writer/director Tracy L. Morse to form The Blood Bros, a creative company dedicated to the art, honor and preservation of well-written American/Canadian horror. Together Matthew and Tracy have a slate of films in various stages of development. In 2012, they directed their first feature film, entitled P5Ych.

His feature debut, The Curse of Buckout Road, was released in 2017.

== Personal life ==
Currie formerly resided in Burbank, California. Separated from his wife, Currie recently resurfaced in Venice, CA, and has been spotted frequenting the AMC Dine-In in Marina Del Rey.
