= Godiva's =

- Genre: Comedy drama
- Directed by: Gary Harvey; Scott Smith; Anne Wheeler
- Starring: Erin Karpluk; Stephen Lobo; Carmen Moore; Sonja Bennett; Leah Cairns; Noel Fisher
- Country of origin: Canada
- Original language: English
- No. of seasons: 2
- No. of episodes: 19 (list of episodes)

Production
- Production locations: Vancouver, British Columbia, Canada
- Running time: 60 minutes

Original release
- Network: Bravo! Citytv
- Release: 16 March 2005 – 12 June 2006

Godiva's is a Canadian television comedy-drama series created by Michael MacLennan with Julia Keatley of Keatley Entertainment. It debuted on Bravo! and Citytv in 2005 and was celebrated for its intelligent, fast-paced depiction of young Canadians in the restaurant industry. The series was nominated for numerous Gemini Awards including Best Series.

Although the series was critically well received, after completing a successful two-season run in 2006, it was not renewed for a third season by CHUM broadcasting.

== Plot ==
Set in Vancouver's Yaletown district, the series revolved around ten young friends working at the hip Godiva's bistro.

== Cast ==
- Erin Karpluk played Kate, the restaurant's manager. She is a transplant to Vancouver from Toronto. At the beginning of the series, she is engaged to Bruce, but they break up after she cheats on him with their realtor, Zach. After that, she goes through several brief relationships, and is eventually date-raped by Joe, a man who picks her up at a club. At the same time, she deals with fending off Garth, a property manager who is trying to buy the neighbourhood in which the Godiva's building is situated.
- Stephen Lobo played Ramir, the head chef. He is an East Indian chef who often has to deal with his overbearing parents, who are disappointed with his chosen career path (mainly because he frequently cooks meat). He is known as a player and has an on-and-off relationship with Jenna throughout the series, though he is more interested in the physical aspects of it than the emotional ones. He becomes engaged to Rajni, the daughter of family friends, who tells him that she is a lesbian. She convinces him to ask for her hand so they can satisfy their parents, but he abruptly leaves her during the middle of their wedding. This leads his father to disown him. Ramir consistently debates between continuing work at Godiva's and opening his own restaurant, at one point offering Martin the opportunity to become his partner in a potential new venture.
- Carmen Moore played Simone, the bartender. She is known for her sarcastic commentary and her wide-ranging knowledge of alcoholic drinks, which was likely gleaned during her period as an alcoholic. She throws out her back in the middle of the series and becomes addicted to her painkillers, but she quickly solves this by seeking acupuncture treatments from Victor. She has a daughter named Chantal, who shows up unexpectedly near the end of the series and ends up running away with T.J.
- Neil Grayston played Martin, the sous chef. He is Ramir's roommate and frequently has to deal with the "noises" coming from Ramir's bedroom. He shows almost zero interest in women at the beginning of the series and almost resigns himself to asexuality, though he eventually begins taking hormone treatments, whose side effects cause his budding relationship with a woman named Jane to fail miserably.
- Michael McMurtry played Cordell, the waiter. He is a flamboyant homosexual who often makes no secret of his effeminate nature, as proven when he tells Daisy, "Just don't expect me to put out." He has a fragile relationship with a man named Drew, who is more interested in monogamy than the more promiscuous Cordell. This catches up with Cordell when he fears that he may have contracted HIV. Though primarily a waiter, Cordell becomes the restaurant's sommelier with the instruction of Simone and a wine expert named Telmo, with whom he sleeps one night.
- Sonja Bennett played Daisy, the pastry chef. She is a devout vegetarian and the "peacemaker" of the group. She develops a close friendship with Victor after he begins his medical practice. She begins dating Sam, a local organic farmer, who runs the meditation group she joins after witnessing a harrowing death. His influence causes her to rename herself "Savitri" (Sanskrit for "daughter of the sun") and behave erratically in the kitchen. Daisy is fired from Godiva's after stealing from her co-workers in order to help the meditation group's charity project. After a particularly uncomfortable encounter with a fellow member and pressure from Cordell and Victor, she leaves the group and is allowed to return to her old job at Godiva's.
- Matthew Currie Holmes played Stick, the prep chef. He is considered the slacker of the kitchen crew, often seen with his surfboard at Wreck Beach, or smoking marijuana on the restaurant's loading dock. He comes from a wealthy Vancouver family that he generally tries to avoid, though their social influence helped him get out of jail for dealing drugs. He develops a crush on Jenna while she is having problems with Ramir, and later becomes her boyfriend.
- Rick Tae played Victor, the dishwasher. He was a doctor in his native China, but due to his poor English, he cannot get a medical license in Canada. For a short time, he offered medical treatment to patients at the back of the restaurant, but quickly halted his "practice" after a patient was killed. He lives with his wife, Su Fei, and their daughter, Anita.
- Noel Fisher played TJ, the busboy and the owner's son. He is often immature and rude to the fellow restaurant staff, which may stem from the constant absence of Godiva, his mother. He is sometimes seen with a group of hard-edged classmates, Coulter, Mitchell, and Dani, who at one point almost burn down the restaurant when he lets them in after closing. He eventually becomes a DJ, running a nightclub out of his apartment above the restaurant. At the close of the series, he runs away with Chantal, Simone's daughter — ironically, he had lost his virginity to Simone in a much earlier episode.
- Leah Cairns played Jenna, the waitress. She is an aspiring dancer who has trouble finding a role, once because of her age. She has a one-sided, mostly physical relationship with Ramir at the beginning of the show. She later gets together with the more romantic Stick.

== Episodes ==
#	Title	Airdate	Synopsis
101	"Begin It Now"	March 16, 2005	
102	"The Hungry Ghost"	March 23, 2005	
103	"Having Her Cake"	March 30, 2005	
104	"Masters of Delusion"	April 6, 2005	
105	"Fancy Footwork"	April 13, 2005	
106	"Fast and Loose"	April 20, 2005	
201	"Floodgates"	February 14, 2006	
202	"Flipping Switches"	February 21, 2006	
203	"Out the Door"	February 28, 2006	
204	"Champagne Kisses"	March 7, 2006	
205	"Dead Flowers"	March 12, 2006	
206	"Forbidden Fruit"	March 21, 2006	
207	"Rubbing Shoulders"	March 28, 2006	
208	"The Bigger Man"	April 4, 2006	
209	"Tempting the Spice"	April 15, 2006	
210	"Little Engines"	April 22, 2006	
211	"The Fifth Taste"	April 29, 2006	
212	"Inked"	May 6, 2006	
213	"Exit Strategies"	May 13, 2006	

== Reviews ==
- "Created by Michael MacLennan and Julia Keatley, the show throbs with style and confidence. It is, in a word, outstanding. [...] In the interest of balance, I tried, repeatedly, to come up with something negative but was stumped. One pompous chef describes Ramir's cooking as "assertive yet complex." You could say the same thing about this show." - Vinay Menon, Toronto Star
- "Godiva's looks as if it could be the most exciting opening act in Canadian TV drama since The Eleventh Hour." - Alex Strachan, National Post
- "The dialogue sparkles with wit and bite." - John Doyle, The Globe and Mail
- "The kudos are warranted. Godiva's [...] sharp writing, three-dimensional characters and moments of unexpected sensitivity make Godiva's air of jaded hipness ring with an authenticity foreign to most prime-time series. Deftly veering from comedy to drama, the show's ability to convey the subtle shadings of real life not only give it a grit and urgency, but it also makes us care about characters who—in a different format—would seem unlikable and off-putting. In the end, Godiva's edgy rock-and-roll attitude is a clever illusion. Deep down, this is a show about heart." - Joel Rubinoff, Hamilton Spectator

== Awards and nominations ==
=== Canadian Screen Awards ===
Year	Category	Nominee	Result	Ref
2005	Best Dramatic Series	Gigi Boyd, Michael MacLennan, Julia Keatley	Nominated	
2005	Best Performance by an Actor in a Featured Supporting Role in a Dramatic Series	Noel Fisher	Nominated	
2006	Best Performance by an Actor in a Featured Supporting Role in a Dramatic Series	Rick Tae	Nominated	
2006	Best Performance by an Actor in a Featured Supporting Role in a Dramatic Series	Michael McMurtry	Nominated	
2006	Best Performance by an Actress in a Continuing Leading Dramatic Role	Erin Karpluk	Nominated	

=== Directors Guild of Canada Awards ===
Year	Category	Nominee	Result	Ref
2007	Outstanding Television Series - Drama	Directing Team - Episode 212: Inked	Nominated	

=== Leo Awards ===
Year	Category	Nominee	Result	Ref
2005	Best Dramatic Series	Julia Keatley, Michael MacLennan, Gigi Boyd	Nominated	
2005	Best Screenwriting in a Dramatic Series	Michael MacLennan	Nominated	
2005	Best Picture Editing in a Dramatic Series	Mike Banas	Nominated	
2005	Best Musical Score in a Dramatic Series	James Jandrisch	Nominated	
2005	Best Supporting Performance by a Male in a Dramatic Series	Matthew Currie Holmes	Won	
2005	Best Supporting Performance by a Male in a Dramatic Series	Rick Tae	Nominated	
2005	Best Supporting Performance by a Female in a Dramatic Series	Sonja Bennett	Nominated	
2005	Best Lead Performance by a Female in a Dramatic Series	Erin Karpluk	Nominated	
2006	Best Direction in a Dramatic Series	Gary Harvey	Nominated	
2006	Best Direction in a Dramatic Series	Anthony Atkins	Nominated	
2006	Best Screenwriting in a Dramatic Series	Michael MacLennan	Nominated	
2006	Best Screenwriting in a Dramatic Series	Michael MacLennan, Abigail Kinch	Nominated	
2006	Best Picture Editing in a Dramatic Series	Mike Banas	Nominated	
2006	Best Guest Performance by a Female in a Dramatic Series	Veena Sood	Won	
2006	Best Supporting Performance by a Male in a Dramatic Series	Rick Tae	Won	
2006	Best Supporting Performance by a Male in a Dramatic Series	Matthew Currie Holmes	Nominated	
2006	Best Supporting Performance by a Male in a Dramatic Series	Neil Grayston	Nominated	
2006	Best Supporting Performance by a Female in a Dramatic Series	Carmen Moore	Nominated	
2006	Best Supporting Performance by a Female in a Dramatic Series	Sonja Bennett	Nominated	
2006	Best Supporting Performance by a Female in a Dramatic Series	Leah Cairns	Nominated	
2006	Best Lead Performance by a Male in a Dramatic Series	Stephen Lobo	Won	
2006	Best Lead Performance by a Female in a Dramatic Series	Erin Karpluk	Nominated	
