= Nguyen Qui Duc =

Vietnamese American radio broadcaster, writer, editor and translator (1958–2023)

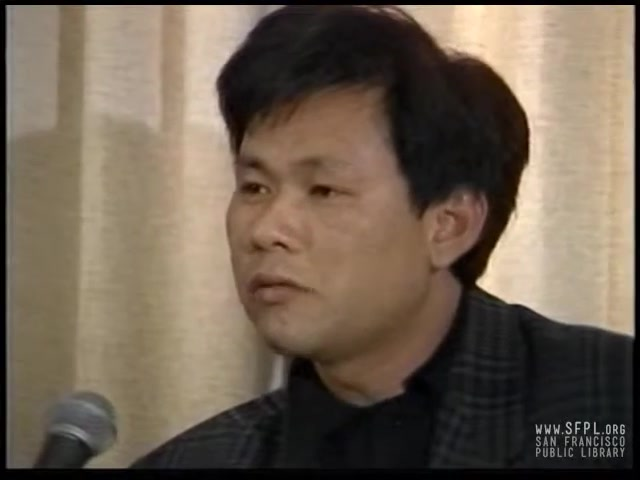
Image of Nguyen Qui Duc

Nguyen Qui Duc (Vietnamese: Nguyễn Quí Đức; 1958 – 22 November 2023) was a Vietnamese American radio broadcaster, writer, editor and translator.

== Biography ==
Born in Da Lat, Vietnam in 1958, he came to the United States in 1975, returning in the fall of 2006 to live in Hanoi, Vietnam. He was a radio producer and writer from 1979 onwards, working for the British Broadcasting Corporation in London and KALW-FM in San Francisco and as a commentator for National Public Radio. He was the host of Pacific Time, KQED-FM Public Radio's national program on Asian and Asian American Affairs, from 2000 to 2006. His essays have been published in The Asian Wall Street Journal Weekly, The New York Times Magazine, The San Francisco Examiner, The San Jose Mercury News and other newspapers. Other essays, poems, and short stories have appeared in City Lights Review, Salamander, Zyzzyva, Manoa Journal, Van, Van Hoc, and Hop Luu, as well as in several anthologies such as Under Western Eyes, Watermark, and Veterans of War, Veterans of Peace.

Nguyen Qui Duc was the author of Where the Ashes Are: The Odyssey of a Vietnamese Family, and the translator of the novella Behind The Red Mist by Ho Anh Thai, (Curbstone Press, 1997). He was also co-editor, with John Balaban, of Vietnam: A Traveler's Literary Companion (Whereabouts Press, 1995), and Once Upon A Dream, The Vietnamese American Experience, (Andrews and McMeel, 1995). His translation of The Time Tree, Poems by Huu Thinh, (Curbstone Press, 2004), with George Evans, was a finalist for the 2004 Translation Prize by the Northern California Book Reviewers Association.

Nguyen died from cancer of the brain, lungs and abdomen on 22 November 2023.

== Awards ==
Nguyen was awarded the Overseas Press Club's Citation of Excellence for his reports from Viet Nam for NPR in 1989, and in 1994, he was artist-in-residence at the Villa Montalvo Estates for the Arts, where he wrote the play A Soldier Named Tony D., based on a short story by Lê Minh Khuê, and produced in 1995 by EXIT Theatre at Knuth Hall, San Francisco. In 2001, Nguyen was named One of 30 Most Notable Asian Americans by A-Media. His documentary on Chinese youths, Shanghai Nights, was part of PBS Frontline/World series that was awarded the 2004 Edward R. Murrow Award of Excellence in Television Documentary from the Overseas Press Club of America, and the same year, he also received a fellowship for outstanding achievements from the Alexander Gerbode Foundation. In October 2006, he received the Distinguished Service Award for his contributions to journalism from the Society of Professional Journalists.
