= Matsudaira Tadanari =

Senior Fourth Rank Viscount Matsudaira Tadanari
- 松平 忠礼
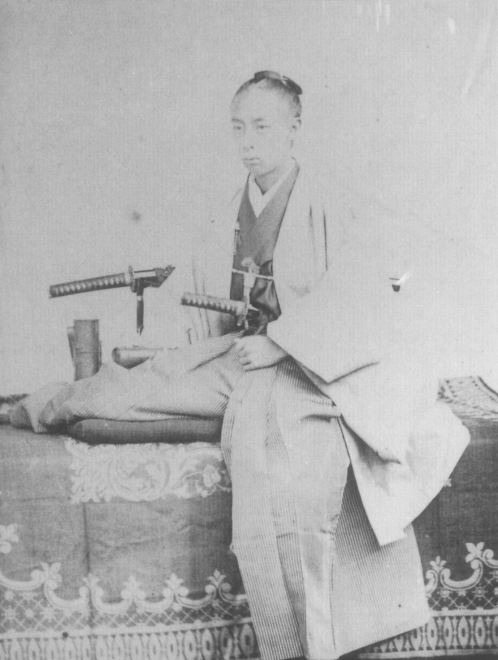
- Matudaira Tadanari in 1868

7th Daimyō of Ueda Domain
- In office 1859–1868
- Monarchs: Shōgun: Tokugawa Iemochi; Tokugawa Yoshinobu
- Preceded by: Matsudaira Tadakata
- Succeeded by: position abolished -

Imperial Governor of Ueda
- In office 1868–1871
- Monarch: Emperor Meiji

Personal details
- Born: July 22, 1850
- Died: March 19, 1895 (aged 44)
- Spouses: (1) Takarahime, daughter of Ōta Sukemoto of Kakegawa Domain; (2) Toyohime, daughter of Yamauchi Toshiyoshi of Tosa Domain
- Parent: Matsudaira Tadakata (father)

Viscount Matsudaira Tadanari (松平 忠礼, July 22, 1850 – March 19, 1895) was the 7th (and final) daimyō of Ueda Domain in Shinano Province, Honshū, Japan (modern-day Nagano Prefecture) and 9th hereditary chieftain of the Fujii-Matsudaira clan under the Bakumatsu period Tokugawa shogunate. His courtesy title before the Meiji restoration was Iga-no-kami, and his Court rank was Junior Fifth Rank, Lower Grade.

== Biography ==
Matsudaira Tadanari was the third son of Matsudaira Tadakata and became heir on the deaths both his elder brothers in infancy. He became daimyō in 1859 on the sudden death of his father. Due to his youth, he had difficulties in holding the clan together during the tumultuous Bakumatsu period. The domain sided with the imperial cause in the Boshin War of the Meiji restoration from 1868 and contributed its military forces to the Battle of Hokuetsu and Battle of Aizu, but its kokudaka was still reduced by the new Meiji government by 3000 koku. In June 1869, he was appointed imperial governor; however, only two months later faced a serious peasant's revolt in his domain which was suppressed only with difficulty. With the abolition of the han system in 1871, he relocated to Tokyo.

The following year, together with his younger brother, Matsudaira Tadaatsu, he travelled to the United States and attended Rutgers University, where he excelled in his studies and where he was inducted into the Phi Beta Kappa honor society. He returned to Japan in 1879. In 1880, he received a position at the Ministry of Foreign Affairs. In 1884 he was elevated to the title of viscount (shisaku) under the kazoku peerage system. In 1890, with the creation of the House of Peers in the Diet of Japan, he was appointed to a seat, but declined the honor. He died in 1895 at the age of 46. His court rank was posthumously elevated to Upper Fourth Rank.

Matsudaira Tadanari's wife was a younger daughter of Ōta Sukemoto of Kakegawa Domain. After her death, he remarried to a younger daughter of Yamauchi Toshiyoshi of Tosa Domain. He had no children, but adopted the son of his younger brother, Doi Tadanao, who took the name of Matsudaira Tadamasa (1886-1963).

His grave is at the Yanaka Cemetery in Tokyo.
