= The Curse of Buckout Road =

- Release poster
- Directed by: Matthew Currie Holmes
- Written by: Matthew Currie Holmes
- Produced by: Brad William Clark; John Gillespie
- Starring: Evan Ross; Henry Czerny; Dominique Provost-Chalkley; Danny Glover; Colm Feore
- Cinematography: Rudolf Blahacek
- Edited by: Lindsay Ljungkull
- Music by: Ryan Shore
- Production company: Trimuse Entertainment Inc.
- Distributed by: Vertical Entertainment
- Release dates: November 24, 2017 (Blood in the Snow Canadian Film Festival); September 27, 2019
- Running time: 97 minutes
- Country: Canada
- Language: English

The Curse of Buckout Road is a 2017 Canadian horror film written and directed by Matthew Currie Holmes and starring Evan Ross, Henry Czerny and Dominique Provost-Chalkley. It is Currie Holmes' directorial debut.

== Plot ==
Aaron Powell returns home from the Naval Postgraduate School to his grandfather, a brilliant psychiatrist, Lawrence Powell. Dr. Powell and his colleague, police detective Roy Harris, are investigating a recent suicide of college professor Stephanie Hancock, who suffered from nightmares that involved the infamous urban legends of Buckout Road. While they think she was mentally unstable, Mrs. Hancock's student Cleo Harris, who was working on an assignment about the Buckout Road urban myth, starts to show the same symptoms. Cleo and Aaron realize that they have to solve the mystery of how to stop the evil before it takes their souls as well.

== Cast ==
- Evan Ross as Aaron Powell
- Henry Czerny as Detective Roy Harris
- Dominique Provost-Chalkley as Cleo Harris
- Colm Feore as Reverend Mike Reagan
- Danny Glover as Dr. Lawrence Powell
- Mayko Nguyen as Professor Stephanie Hancock
- Kyle Mack as Eric Danzer
- Jim Watson as Derek Danzer

== Production ==
The film was shot in Greater Sudbury in 2016.

== Release ==
The film premiered at the Blood in the Snow Canadian Film Festival in 2017.

== Reception ==
The film has a 63% rating on Rotten Tomatoes. JimmyO of JoBlo.com gave the film a 7 out of 10.
