= Pacific Time (radio show) =

- Running time: ca. 29 min.
- Country of origin: United States
- Language: English
- Home station: KQED
- Hosted by: Oanh Ha
- Created by: Nguyen Qui Duc; George Lewinski; Nina Thorsen
- Written by: Oanh Ha
- Directed by: Nina Thorsen
- Produced by: Nina Thorsen
- Executive producer: Raul Ramirez
- Recording studio: San Francisco, California
- Original release: November 16, 2000 – October 11, 2007
- Audio format: Stereophonic
- Website: Official website

Pacific Time was a weekly radio program that covered a wide range of Asian American, East Asian and Southeast Asian issues, including economics, language, politics, public policy, business, the arts and sports. With news bureaus in Bangkok, Beijing, and Tokyo, it was the only public radio program devoted to Asian-American issues.

Produced by KQED in San Francisco, California, the show was syndicated by as many as 37 other public radio stations in markets around the United States. The show premiered in 2000 and was hosted by Nguyen Qui Duc until September, 2006, when Nguyen returned to Vietnam. After Nguyen's departure it was hosted by K. Oanh Ha. Citing financial difficulties, KQED cancelled the show and its last broadcast was October 11, 2007. At the time it was cancelled the program cost $500,000 per year to produce and had a weekly audience of 190,000.

== Stations ==
Stations carrying Pacific Time:

- KQED, San Francisco (producer)
- KAZU, Monterey, California
- KHSR, Crescent City, California
- KHSU, Arcata, California
- KIDE, Hoopa, California
- KIPO, Honolulu, Hawaii
- KPBS, San Diego, California
- KQEI-FM, Sacramento, California
- KQVO, Calexico, California
- KUOW-FM, Seattle, Washington
- WBAA-FM, West Lafayette, Indiana
- WETA, Washington, D.C.
- WGMS, Hagerstown, Maryland
- WILL, Urbana, Illinois
- WNYC, New York City, New York
- Hong Kong Radio Television 3, Hong Kong
