= Matsudaira Tadaatsu =

Japanese civil engineer (1851–1888)

Matsudaira Tadaatsu (松平忠厚) (September 19, 1851 – January 24, 1888) was a Japanese civil engineer. He was one of the few members of the Iwakura Mission who stayed in the United States after graduating from a college there. He worked in mines in the western United States and Pennsylvania.

== Early life and education ==
Matsudaira was born on September 19, 1851 Edo Castle, which is now part of the Imperial Palace in Tokyo. His father was Matsudaira Tadakata, and his older brother was Matsudaira Tadanari. He attended a Christian church in Tsukiji. In 1872, Matsudaira went to New York with Tadanari as part of the Iwakura Mission. They enrolled in Rutgers University in New Jersey. Matsudaira transferred to Harvard and graduated with a degree in civil engineering in 1877. Tadakata ordered both of his sons to return home in 1879, but only Tadanari returned. Matsudaira was one of the only members of the Iwakura Mission to remain in the United States.

== Career ==
After graduation Matsudaira worked for the Manhattan Elevated Railway. While working there, he invented the trigonometer, a surveying tool. He then moved to Wyoming and worked as an engineer at the Union Pacific Railroad. He later worked in mines in Idaho and Montana. He became the city engineer of Bradford, Pennsylvania in 1884. While living in Pennsylvania he married and had two children with Cary Sampson, the daughter of Archibald Sampson, a general in the United States Army. One of his children was Kinjiro Matsudaira, who would later serve as the mayor of Edmonston, Maryland.

Matsudaira contracted tuberculosis, and the family moved to Denver, Colorado in hopes that the dry climate would improve his health. Before he died, he made some maps of the state. He died on January 24, 1888. In 1952 several Japanese Colorodans erected a memorial in Riverside Cemetery in his name. However, even though the memorial stone says that he was the first Japanese person to live in Colorado, the federal census suggests that other Japanese people lived in Colorado before 1890.
