= Christin Baker =

American screenwriter

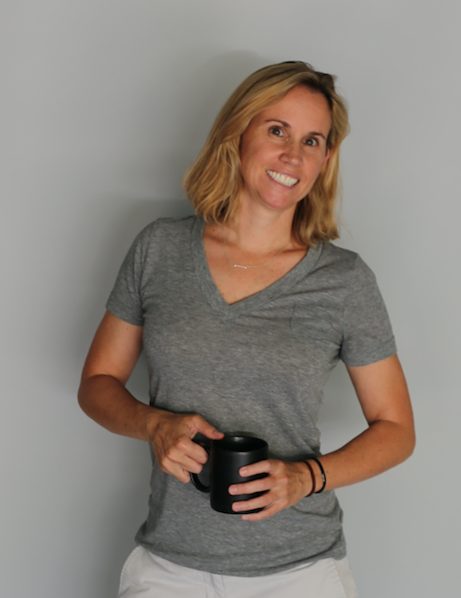
- Born: Danville, Indiana
- Other name: Christin Mell
- Occupations: Producer, director, screenwriter
- Years active: 2007–present
- Employer: Tello Films
- Notable work: Maybelle
- Board member of: Tello Films (CEO)
- Spouse: Deb Mell (m. 2011; div. 2014)
- Partner(s): Stacey Powell (2023–present; engaged)
- Awards: Best Director, London Raindance Film Festival
- Website: https://www.tellofilms.com

Christin Marie Baker is an American producer, director, and screenwriter from Nashville, Tennessee. She is the founder and CEO of Tello Films, a streaming network, production, and distribution company of films and web series with a lesbian focus.

== Early life and education ==
Baker is originally from Indiana but grew up in Nashville, Tennessee. She attended Middle Tennessee State University, where she graduated with a Bachelor of Arts in Television Production. In addition, Baker earned a Master's of Organizational Development and Management for Non-Profit Organizations from Springfield College.

== Career ==
Baker was interested in broadcast journalism and held an internship at a local station, but after a spell on a movie set as an extra shifted toward film-based storytelling. She worked for Regency Productions in Los Angeles, before moving to a television credits position with the Writers Guild of America. She worked for the YMCA of the USA, overseeing the arts and humanities programs.

In 2007, Baker co-founded Tello Films as an open platform that supported filmmakers who made content for the lesbian community. The site moved to a premium subscription service in 2009 and Baker started producing and directing content for it.

== Personal life ==
Baker married Deborah ("Deb") Mell, an American politician from Chicago, in 2011. They divorced in 2014.

In December 2023, Baker announced on Instagram she had gotten engaged to partner Stacey Powell.

== Filmography ==
=== Film ===
Year	Title	Director	Producer	Writer	Notes
2008	Human Potential	Yes	Yes		Short film (as Christin Mell)
2012	The Throwaways		Yes	Yes	
2014	God Des & She: Never Give Up	Yes	Yes		Short film, documentary (as Christin Mell)
2018	Alice & Iza	Yes	Yes		Short film
2019	Riley Parra: Better Angels	Yes	Yes		
2019	Season of Love	Yes	Yes		
2020	I Hate New Year's	Yes	Yes	Yes	
2021	Christmas at the Ranch	Yes	Yes	Yes	
2022	Merry and Gay	Yes			

=== Television ===
Year	Title	Director	Producer	Writer	Notes
2011	McManusLand		Yes		(as Christin Mell)
2011	Cowgirl Up	Yes	Yes		(as Christin Mell)
2012	I Hate Tommy Finch	Yes	Yes	Yes	TV movie
2013	Gay Street Therapy		Yes	Yes	
2013	The Neighbors	Yes	Yes		Mini-series (as Christin Mell)
2013	Roomies	Yes	Yes	Yes	(as Christin Mell)
2013	Nikki & Nora: The N&N Files		Yes		(as Christin Mell)
2014	The Pitch Show		Yes		Mini-series
2014	Rent Controlled		Yes		TV movie
2014–2015	#Hashtag: The Series	Yes	Yes		
2015	Plus One		Yes		Mini-series
2015	Maybelle	Yes	Yes		Nomination: International Academy of Web Television award for Best Writing (Bridget McManus), Best Original Score (Karman Kregloe); Won: London Raindance Film Festival award for Best Director (Christin Baker)
2016	Dana Goldberg Comedy Show	Yes	Yes		TV special
2016	Skirtchasers		Yes		TV movie
2016	Bridget McManus Comedy Special	Yes	Yes	Yes	
2016	Dagger Kiss		Yes		
2016	The List		Yes		TV movie
2016	Full Out		Yes		Mini-series
2017	secs & EXECS		Yes		Nomination: Emmy Award for Outstanding Actress in a Short Form Comedy or Drama Series (Mindy Sterling)
2017–2018	Riley Parra	Yes	Yes	Yes	
2019	Passage	Yes	Yes		
2019	Happy Wife, Happy Life: Marriage Advice from Happily Married Non-Experts	Yes			Talk show

== See also ==
- List of female film and television directors
- List of lesbian filmmakers
- List of LGBT-related films directed by women
