= Kinjiro Matsudaira =

American politician

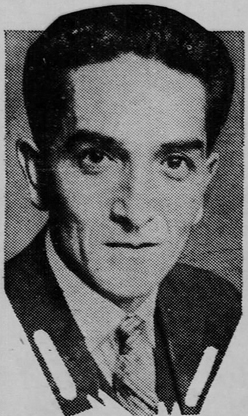
- Matsudaira c. 1928

Personal details
- Born: September 13, 1885 Pennsylvania, United States
- Died: October 1, 1963 (aged 78)
- Children: 3
- Parent(s): Matsudaira Tadaatsu; Carrie Sampson

Kinjiro Matsudaira (松平 欽次郎, Matsudaira Kinjirō; September 13, 1885 – October 1963) was an American inventor and politician who served as the mayor of Edmonston, Maryland in 1927 and 1943.

== Biography ==
Matsudaira was born in Pennsylvania on September 13, 1885, as the son of a Japanese father, Tadaatsu, and an American mother, Carrie Sampson. He was a descendant of the Fujii-Matsudaira clan. After his father's death, he lived with his maternal grandparents in Virginia. On May 1, 1912, Matsudaira filed for U.S. Patent 1,111,912 concerning the functions of a thermometric fire-detector. The patent was granted to him on September 29, 1914.

In 1925, Matsudaira sent a letter to the Embassy of Japan in Washington, D.C., asking whether he was related to Tsuneo Matsudaira, the Japanese Ambassador to the United States at the time.

Matsudaira was elected as the mayor of Edmonston, Maryland, in the summer of 1927. The election reportedly made him the first Asian American mayor in the United States. He was re-elected as mayor of Edmonston in 1943.
