= Miss LA Chinatown =

Miss Los Angeles Chinatown
- Formation: 1963
- Type: Beauty pageant
- Location: Los Angeles, California
- Website: lachinesechamber.org

Miss Los Angeles Chinatown (Chinese: 洛杉磯華埠小姐) 2026 is Victoria Yip. The pageant was started in 1963.

== Overview ==
The program is sponsored by the Chinese Chamber of Commerce of Los Angeles. Miss Los Angeles Chinatown will be responsible to select an organization(s) that is related to the cause they want to benefit for their year of reign. Together with the support of the CCCLA, they will be responsible to design a brand calendar for the year of events they will personally lead the court to participate in, to support that organization in a direct and impactful manner. Miss Los Angeles Chinatown will be responsible for launching an online blog hosted on the CCCLA website, where they can reflect on their charitable work, promote and educate the public about their cause, and rally support of the Chinese American community. Miss Chinatown and her court attend many events during the year, including the annual Golden Dragon New Year Parade.

== History ==
The pageant was started in 1963. In addition to the queen, four princesses and one Miss Friendship are chosen each year. In previous years, there were also a Miss Firecracker, Miss Personality, Miss Photogenic, Miss Teen Chinatown, and Miss Chinese New Year.

== Requirements ==
Eligibility of Applicants:

- Between the ages of 18 and 27 old on Pageant Date (previously 18 and 26)
- Single
- Education with High School Diploma or Equivalent Education (the California High School Proficiency Examination (CHSPE) and the General Educational Development (GED)), or Above
- 25% Chinese ancestry
- Must be fluent in English
- U.S. citizen or U.S. permanent resident
- Resident of the Greater Los Angeles area

== List of Miss Los Angeles Chinatown ==
Year	Name	Chinese	Notes
1962	Christine Lee		
1967	Schumarry Chao	趙曉美	
1968	Virginia Lee		
1969	Maresa Chan	陳嘉玲	
1970	May Low	劉美芳	
1971	Carole Wong	黃鳳蘭	
1972	Lai Fong Wong		
1973	Karen Chinn	陳歡笑	
1974	Betty Kym Young		
1975	Lisa Wong	黃麗詩	
1976	Donna Anne Lee	李藍月	
1977	Arlene Jue		
1978	Lucia Hwong	黃漢淇	
1979	Denise Shue	劉秀玲	
1980	Jacqueline Tom Quon	方美蘭	
1981	Cindy Pan		
1982	Sepherteen Jew	關秋月	
1983	Cynthia Gouw	吳義菊	
1984	Susan P. Wan	溫惠珍	
1985	Mary Chu	朱珩	
1986	Judy Wang	王琬婷	
1987	Sheryl Jung	朱妙蓮	
1988	Lisa Chen Kwong	陳毓英	
1989	Dale Wong		
1990	Christina Gong		
1991	Annie Liu		
1992	Ada Tai		
1993	Jeannie Chan Yee		
1994	Cindy Fong		
1995	Yennis Wong	黃欣娜	
1996	Emily Lau		
1997	Christina Wu	吳雅婷	
1998	Lisa Quon		
1999	Melody Liu	劉恭顯	
2000	Dana Yee	余美花	
2001	Lynn Liou	劉宣麟	
2002	Tiffany Liu	劉蒂蒂	
2003	Priscilla Tjio	蔣碧喜	
2004	Heidi Woan	溫海玓	
2005	Jessica Feng	馮倩	
2006	Melody Cheng	程子琪	
2007	Laurel Chung	鍾朗殷	
2008	Sharon Ha	柯彥竹	
2009	Lindsay Louie	雷華星	
2010	Jani Wang	汪敏潔	
2011	Xiayi Shirley Zhang	章夏怡	
2012	Lauren Zhou Weinberger	周慧倫	
2013	Wendy Shu	束雯	
2014	Katrina Lee	李玉薇	
2015	Alice Wong	黃嘉欣	
2016	Li Qu	曲里	
2017	Angela Liu	劉思延	
2018	Catherine Liang	梁瀅	
2019	Kellie Chin	陳楷麗	
2020	Corrie Chan	陳皓盈	
2024	Saerlaith Dunn	鄧安盈	
2025	Nina Koh	柯明君	
2026	Victoria Beverly Yip	葉美恆	

== List of Miss Los Angeles Chinatown - 1st Princess ==
Year	Name	Chinese	Notes
2017	Colleen Cheung		
2018	Joyce Lam		
2019	Isabelle Liu		
2020	Angela Zhou	周浩芝	
2022	Wendy Tu		
2024	Michelle Situ	司徒美笑	
2025	Ashley Gong	龔美美	
2026	Ashley Lai	黎涵姿	Daughter of 1994 Queen Cindy Fong

== List of Miss Los Angeles Chinatown - 2nd Princess ==
Year	Name	Chinese	Notes
2017			
2018	Jasmine Lam		
2019	Sela Wang		
2020	Catherine Hang	韓惠蓮	
2022	Shuru Han		
2024	Charlotte Peng	彭与涵	
2025	Jennitine Chang	張笙庭	
2026	Michelle Sheen	冼美珊	

== List of Miss Los Angeles Chinatown - 3rd Princess ==
Year	Name	Chinese	Notes
2017			
2018	Jaclyn Perry		
2019	Ashley Erin Thompson	美莉	
2020	Yiwa Lau	劉綺華	
2022	Kimberly Renee Low		
2024	Ashley Yao	姚嘉琳	
2025	Michelle Dupont	杜靜	
2026	Maggie Ly	李雨欣	

== List of Miss Los Angeles Chinatown - 4th Princess ==
Year	Name	Chinese	Notes
2022	Megan Anne Dalton Thompson		
2025	Terena Phan	潘佳美	
2026	Jinghan Kang	康静涵	

== List of Miss Los Angeles Chinatown - Miss Friendship ==
Year	Name	Chinese	Notes
2025	Jennitine Chang	張笙庭	
2026	Michelle Chang	張郁庭	

== Broadcast ==
The pageant was broadcast on KSCI (LA18), the local Public-access television cable TV channel.

Full shows of the 2025 and 2026 pageants can be found on the Official YouTube channel.

== See also ==
- Miss Chinatown USA
- Miss Chinese International
- Miss Chinese Toronto
- Miss Chinese Vancouver
- Miss NY Chinese
