= Season of Love (2019 film) =

- Directed by: Christin Baker
- Starring: Laur Allen; Jessica Clark; Sandra Mae Frank; Emily Goss; Dominique Provost-Chalkley; Janelle Marie Rodriguez
- Music by: Dominique Provost-Chalkley
- Distributed by: Tello Films
- Release date: 2019
- Running time: 105 minutes
- Country: United States

Season of Love is a 2019 American romantic comedy film directed by Christin Baker, from a screenplay written by Kathryn Trammell. Featuring an ensemble cast including Dominque Provost-Chalkley, Sandra Mae Frank, Laur Allen, Janelle Marie Rodriguez, Jessica Clark, and Emily Goss, the story follows three female couples as they fall in love over the holiday season. The film was described as "a Love, Actually for our [queer] community".

The film was produced in-house by Tello Films and released on the company's streaming platform on November 29, 2019.

== Plot ==
The story of a group of diverse women and their connected love lives who discover the meaning of love as they navigate the Christmas holiday season.

== Cast ==
- Dominique Provost-Chalkley as Sue
- Janelle Marie Rodriguez as Janey
- Jessica Clark as Lou
- Sandra Mae Frank as Kenna
- Emily Goss as Iris
- Laur Allen as Mardou
- Carlin James as Theo
- Matthew Bridges as Charlie
- Lily Richards as Candace

== Production ==
In response to conversations surrounding the lack of LGBTQ+ representation in holiday films (particularly for queer women), Tello Films announced a "Pitch to Production" contest in November 2018. Winners were selected at the beginning of 2019, and Season of Love entered pre-production soon afterwards. Principal photography began in May 2019 and concluded in June 2019.

Baker chose to focus on joyful themes for the film and after the film's release received messages from viewers who were pleased that it was an LGBT movie that did not focus on hardship and that they could watch with their families.

== Release ==
Season of Love had a limited theatrical release beginning November 22, 2019, and was released digitally on the Tello Films platform the following week.

== Reception ==
Critical reception in LGBT media was favorable. Autostraddle said it was "everything you could want from a cheesy holiday movie." Diva praised the film, stating that "It's rare that a film becomes an instant cult classic, but Season Of Love is an exception to that rule". GO wrote that it was "full of adorable little rom-com moments."
