= Laur Allen =

American actress and beauty pageant winner

- Born: March 9 Los Angeles, California, U.S.
- Other name: Lauren Zhou Weinberger
- Education: Vanderbilt University (BA)
- Occupations: Actress; beauty pageant winner
- Years active: 2012-present
- Known for: The Young and the Restless
- Title: Miss LA Chinatown 2012
- Awards: Miss Friendship

Laur Allen (born March 9) is an American actress and beauty pageant winner. She is known for playing Juliet Helton in the American television soap opera, The Young and the Restless.

== Early life ==
Laur Allen was born in Cedars-Sinai Medical Center in Los Angeles, California. She was raised in Pasadena, California.

Allen is the daughter of a Jewish father and a Chinese mother.

Allen attended Vanderbilt University in Nashville, Tennessee, and graduated with a bachelor's degree with a double major in communication studies and Spanish and a minor in corporate strategy. She moved back to Los Angeles and dove into production and behind-the-scenes aspect of acting.

== Beauty pageants ==
Allen won Miss Los Angeles Chinatown on January 14, 2012. She won the beauty pageant under the name Lauren Zhou Weinberger and became the first Miss Los Angeles Chinatown to have half-European and half-Chinese ancestry. She represented Los Angeles at the Miss Chinese International Pageant 2013 in Hong Kong, China. She did not win the title but was awarded Miss Friendship.

== Career ==
After minor acting roles, Allen was cast as Juliet on the American soap opera The Young and the Restless for an eight-episode run. She appeared in 92 episodes.

Allen starred in the 2021 holiday romance film Christmas at the Ranch, playing the character Haley Hollis.

== Filmography ==
=== Film ===
| Year | Title | Role | Notes |
|---|---|---|---|
| 2014 | Black Tiger: Hunter Hunted | Alina | Short |
| 2015 | Memory Transfer | Gena | |
| 2017 | Odious | Gun Range Girl | |
| 2017 | Aimee | Carmen | Short |
| 2018 | Faith Need Not Change Her Gown | Jewel | Short |
| 2019 | Season of Love | Mardou | |
| 2020 | Lumpia with a Vengeance | Anchor | Action comedy film |
| 2020 | Almost Super | Shade | Short |
| 2021 | Christmas at the Ranch | Haley Hollis | Romance film |
| 2023 | The Vigilante | Carmen | Thriller film |
| 2025 | I Love You More Than Dinosaurs | Jade | Short |

=== Television ===
| Year | Title | Role | Notes |
|---|---|---|---|
| 2012 | Stevie TV | | 3 episodes |
| 2016–2018 | Saturday Night Taped | Chelsea | |
| 2017–2018 | The Young and the Restless | Juliet Helton | 92 episodes |
| 2025 | Business People | Victoria Smart | 6 episodes |
