= List of Carmilla episodes =

Carmilla is a Canadian web series, based on the book of the same name, starring Elise Bauman and Natasha Negovanlis, which premiered on Vervegirl YouTube channel on August 19, 2014. The series follows Laura, a freshman student, as she narrates her investigation on the mysterious disappearance of her roommate through her camera, when she is suddenly assigned a mysterious new roommate named Carmilla.

The first season began on August 19, 2014 and concluded on December 2, 2014, consisting of a total of 36 episodes that have a length of three to seven minutes of running time. A Christmas special aired on December 24, 2014, with a length of 7 minutes. A second season was announced on December 9, 2014 and premiered on June 2, 2015; it consisted of 36 episodes and concluded on October 1, 2015, with the season finale earning a length of 16 minutes.

Following the conclusion of the second season, a Season Zero was announced, which premiered on October 22, 2015, on both Vervegirl and U by Kotex YouTube channels, and it is planned to contain 12 episodes, with the remaining episodes premiering on the U by Kotex channel. Season Zero takes place after season 2 but focus on events that transpired prior to the first two seasons.

As of November 17, 2015, 82 episodes of Carmilla, including the Christmas special, have premiered on Vervegirl and U by Kotex YouTube channels. Season Zero premiered on October 22, 2015, and concluded on November 24, 2015. The third and final season consists of 36 episodes and was split into three acts. Act I, which contains the first 17 episodes of the season, aired on September 15, 2016. Act II contains episodes 18-24 and aired on September 29, 2016. Act III contains episodes 25-36 and aired on October 13, 2016.

== Series overview ==
Season	Episodes	Originally released	
Season	Episodes	First released	Last released
1	36	August 19, 2014	December 2, 2014
Special		December 24, 2014	
2	36	June 2, 2015	October 1, 2015
0	12	October 22, 2015	November 24, 2015
3	36	September 15, 2016	October 13, 2016

== Episodes ==
=== Season 1 (2014) ===
No. overall	No. in season	Title	Running time (in minutes)	Original release date
1	1	"Disorientation"	2:37	August 19, 2014
Laura Hollis is three weeks into her first semester at Silas University, and working on a journalism project documenting the weirdness of the school. Her roommate, Betty convinces her to take the night off and attend a party. The next morning, Betty is missing. A slimy note left near her bed claims that she no longer attends the school.
2	2	"Missing"	3:25	August 19, 2014
Laura starts investigating Betty's disappearance. None of the partygoers remember seeing Betty the previous night, and the office of student affairs is completely unhelpful in the matter. Suddenly a girl enters Laura's room and starts making herself at home. She introduces herself as Carmilla, and claims to be Laura’s new roommate.
3	3	"The Roommate"	2:03	August 19, 2014
Laura starts living with Carmilla, who proves to be a terrible roommate. One day, she pours some of Carmilla's "soy milk" into a bowl of cereal and discovers it to be blood.
4	4	"Freak OUT"	1:48	August 19, 2014
Laura meets with her "official" and "unofficial" floor dons, Perry and LaFontaine. She shows them the blood and discusses getting rid of Carmilla. Perry, assuring her that Betty will probably return, reveals that other girls have also gone missing.
5	5	"Patterns"	4:55	August 19, 2014
Laura learns about the girls who have disappeared and then reappeared with no memory of the time in between. She interviews two of them, Sarah Jane and Natalie.
6	6	"Why Bother?"	2:45	August 19, 2014
Having recorded the events of the previous episodes on her webcam, Laura uploads the videos to the Silas University network to spread awareness of the disappearances. Immediately, alarms go off. Perry, running by the door of the room, tells Laura that a town hall meeting has been called.
7	7	"Town Hall"	5:10	August 21, 2014
Laura relays the events that transpired at the town hall meeting. Danny, Laura's lit TA, is also introduced, having joined in on the investigation. After Danny leaves, Kirsch and Will, two members of the Zeta Omega Mu fraternity enter, having declared themselves safety escorts.
8	8	"Pitsa i Thanato"	3:48	August 26, 2014
Kirsch and Will refuse to leave, putting Laura in an awkward position. Carmilla returns to the room and aggresses Kirsch so that he and Will leave.
9	9	"Nancy Drew"	3:57	August 28, 2014
Laura continues her investigation with Danny. Having the idea to talk to Sarah Jane and Natalie again, they discover that the two girls are now acting like party animals.
10	10	"The Real Betty"	3:06	September 2, 2014
Inspired by S.J and Natalie's change in behaviour, Laura looks into Betty's life pre-Silas and discovers that she was a very different person. Perry and LaFontaine then run in, warning of the arrival of the dean, who is there to speak with Carmilla.
11	11	"A Visit From The Dean"	4:18	September 4, 2014
Carmilla hints at her troubles with the Dean to Laura, who empathizes by virtue of having an overprotective father. Laura and Danny then continue investigating. By looking through photos of the parties, they discover that Carmilla has been present at all of them, and was close to the girls who disappeared.
12	12	"Evidence"	5:24	September 9, 2014
Laura summarizes the investigation so far. Danny, followed by Kirsch, enter the room, and nearly get into a fight before Laura talks them down. That night, Laura experiences a disturbing dream.
13	13	"I, Spy"	3:54	September 11, 2014
Laura has been continuing to have bad dreams, which bear a resemblance to the ones that Natalie was having before disappearing. Carmilla offers to get her something to help her sleep which turns out to be a dried bat wing on a bracelet.
14	14	"Research Trip"	5:07	September 16, 2014
Laura and LaFontaine relay how they crashed a Faculty Club meeting in an unsuccessful attempt to talk to the dean. Afterward, they headed to the library to try and follow up on a clue. Laura explains what they discovered: Carmilla shows up at Silas every twenty years under a different name, and each of her appearances coincides with the disappearance of several female students. LaFontaine confirms Laura's suspicions — Carmilla is a vampire.
15	15	"My Roommate, The Vampire"	2:08	September 18, 2014
The group discusses what to do about Carmilla. They decide to trap her to get answers from her, and LaFontaine proposes using Laura as bait.
16	16	"Best Laid Plans"	4:43	September 23, 2014
As the group tries to figure out a plan of action, Kirsch and Will show up. Laura recruits them and the Zetas for help. Later that night, Carmilla arrives in a pensive mood. Laura takes the opportunity to invite her to the Zetas' upcoming party.
17	17	"It's A Trap"	4:00	September 25, 2014
Carmilla decides to have a private party instead of going to the Zetas'. The tension between her and Laura is interrupted when Danny arrives with backup and tackles Carmilla. After an offscreen fight, Carmilla is bound and gagged. Then, Kirsch arrives with disastrous news: Natalie is missing, and Sarah Jane is dead.
18	18	"While You Weren't Watching"	3:35	September 30, 2014
Kirsch tells what happened before leaving to mourn. Laura and the gang discuss what to do with Carmilla. They remove the tape from her mouth, and Carmilla tells them she was not responsible for what happened to Sarah Jane or Natalie.
19	19	"Advanced Interrogation Techniques"	4:34	October 2, 2014
The gang keeps Carmilla tied up in her room for several days trying to get information out of her. Finally, Laura persuades Carmilla to tell her side of the story.
20	20	"Sock Puppets and European History"	7:08	October 7, 2014
Carmilla tells the story of her life as a human, her death and subsequent revival, and her life as a vampire, while Laura narrates with hand puppets. She reveals that the "mother" who revived her and directed the kidnapping schemes is none other than the dean of Silas.
21	21	"Strategic Planning"	3:58	October 9, 2014
The next night, Will arrives to free Carmilla. He is revealed to be another vampire working for the dean. He and Carmilla get into a fight over Laura, and Carmilla ends up punching him. He leaves, with Carmilla in pursuit.
22	22	"Afterbite"	2:24	October 14, 2014
Carmilla returns, having failed to catch Will, and prepares to flee Silas to avoid the wrath of the dean. Laura talks her out of it, arguing her best option is to stay.
23	23	"We Need To Talk About Carmilla"	3:50	October 16, 2014
Laura deals with failing her lit midterm and explains Carmilla's freedom to LaFontaine. Perry, having fled the room before hearing an explanation, returns with a fight-ready Danny.
24	24	"Breaking Up (With An Amazon) Is Hard To Do"	3:26	October 21, 2014
Carmilla quickly dispatches Danny and Laura gets them both to stand down. Danny and Laura get into an argument, which ends with Laura breaking off their tentative relationship.
25	25	"Basic Parasitology"	4:09	October 23, 2014
The next day, LaFontaine returns with the test results for the slime: it's cerebrospinal fluid, and contains parasites. Perry reaches a breaking point and demands that things be normal.
26	26	"The Standard Issue"	3:50	October 28, 2014
LaFontaine and Perry argue, and Perry leaves. Laura has another bad dream later, in which she sees an evil and hungry light. She, Carmilla, and LaFontaine head to the library for more research.
27	27	"Required Reading"	5:13	October 30, 2014
Laura, LaFontaine, and Carmilla are back from the library with an ancient book. They have also rescued J.P. Armitage, a records clerk from 1874 whose consciousness was sucked into the library catalogue and who now exists digitally on a flash drive. The next day, Perry bursts in looking for LaFontaine, who has vanished.
28	28	"Blame Enough For All"	4:46	November 4, 2014
Laura and Perry deal with feelings of guilt. Laura tries to warn Kirsch about Will, but he doesn't believe that Will is a danger.
29	29	"PTSD & Brownies"	3:47	November 6, 2014
Laura and Carmilla are woken up by Perry early in the morning and resume their research. They manage to find a hidden entry on the demonic light, Lophiiformes. Later LaFontaine reappears, with no memory of having vanished.
30	30	"Monsters, Lies & Videotapes"	3:30	November 11, 2014
An audio recording on LaFontaine's phone reveals that the kidnapped girls are alive and together somewhere, and that the ritual is scheduled for the new moon. LaFontaine starts to undergo the personality change associated with the parasites.
31	31	"Of Hearts And Holy Hand Grenades"	4:59	November 13, 2014
Laura has a talk with Danny that ends disastrously. J.P. finds information on a weapon called the Blade of Hastur, which is unreachable except to Carmilla. Meanwhile, Laura finds a necklace on her desk and, assuming it to be from Carmilla, puts it on. Later, she is possessed through it by the dean.
32	32	"Mommy Dearest"	5:15	November 18, 2014
The dean, acting through Laura, destroys J.P.'s flash drive then presents an offer to Carmilla: keep Laura from interfering, and she'll take Kirsch for the ritual instead. Refuse, and she'll take Laura away right then and there. Carmilla accepts her deal.
33	33	"Pep Rally"	4:46	November 20, 2014
Laura tries appealing to the student body at a school event, but it quickly turns sour. Afterward, she discovers the video of herself being possessed by the dean. She confronts Carmilla with it and turns her away.
34	34	"Do Not Go Into The Light"	3:39	November 25, 2014
Laura gets the idea to use LaFontaine to find the ritual. She, LaFontaine and Perry head off. Carmilla is viewing the footage of them later when Danny bursts in, having received a text for help. They head off to join the fight. Skipping to the aftermath of the fight, everyone but Carmilla is gathered in Laura's room. Laura tearfully says that they won, but Carmilla is dead.
35	35	"Heroic Vampire Bull****"	5:37	November 27, 2014
The characters take turns explaining the events of the climactic showdown.
36	36	"Life Goes On"	7:50	December 2, 2014
After another time skip, Laura is recording again to talk about the aftermath of the battle, including the return of Betty, strange tremors, and the discovery of J.P.'s backup. Perry enters to tell Laura that the Zetas have found Carmilla at the site of the battle, just before Danny enters carrying her. Laura revives Carmilla with the carton of blood, and they kiss. In a post-credits scene, LaFontaine bursts into the room in a panic. It becomes apparent that Lophiiformes is still very much alive, as evidenced by the tremors. The town hall alarms then go off.

=== Special (2014) ===
No. overall	Title	Running time (in minutes)	Original release date
37	"The Christmas Special"	7:20	December 24, 2014
Laura, Carmilla, LaFontaine and Perry have taken refuge at an old diner while fleeing from Silas. There, they encounter a strange and sinister baker who tries to turn them into gingerbread. Carmilla easily kills her and the group has a Christmas celebration.

=== Season 2 (2015) ===
No. overall	No. in season	Title	Running time (in minutes)	Original release date
38	1	"Brave New World"	5:58	June 2, 2015
Laura and co. are back at Silas, having been forced to turn back after facing many dangers in the wilderness. Laura recaps from their new place of residence while being interrupted by Carmilla and LaFontaine. Perry enters the room, her hands and lower arms covered in blood.
39	2	"The Voice Of Silas"	4:40	June 4, 2015
Perry talks about how she went to visit the school newspaper, the Voice of Silas, only to find everyone there brutally murdered. Laura resolves to find out what happened to them.
40	3	"SNN"	4:40	June 9, 2015
Laura creates the Silas News Network to report on campus happenings. With the campus divided into three territories — Zeta, Summer Society, and Alchemy Club — Laura calls representatives of the former two groups in for a meeting.
41	4	"War & Pieces"	4:10	June 11, 2015
Kirsch volunteers himself and Danny to represent the Zetas and Summer Society, respectively. After they leave, a shaken Perry enters, a bloody message cut into her stomach.
42	5	"Something Wicked"	5:46	June 16, 2015
Perry describes the dream she had before waking with the message. Laura and her friends attempt to go through the newspaper club's files. The next day, Laura receives a letter announcing that the Silas Board of Governors will be assembling on campus. The Chair of the Board then shows up at the door, introducing herself as Matska Belmonde.
43	6	"The Chair of the Board"	4:38	June 18, 2015
Upon her introduction, it is discovered that Matska, or "Mattie", is Carmilla's older sister. She is intent on killing Laura to avenge the Dean. Carmilla stops Matska from killing Laura and gets her to leave her alone. Matska says that the SNN broadcasts will have to be censored, then takes her leave.
44	7	"Arrangements For Living"	4:15	June 23, 2015
Mattie participates in an SNN broadcast while altering its messages. LaFontaine reports the disappearance of the library.
45	8	"Vanishing Act"	2:04	June 25, 2015
J.P. starts having power issues. Summers and Zetas arrive to protest the Board interfering in their activities, but Mattie cuts through their shouting with a painfully loud screech.
46	9	"Cutting Losses"	3:55	June 30, 2015
Mattie explains that the Board has been making cuts and selling off property to fund damage repair. According to the newspaper club's research, this includes the land around Lophiiformes, the demonic anglerfish. Meanwhile, Kirsch decides to help with the Summer Society's Adonis Hunt and J.P. continues to deteriorate. Perry suggests that Carmilla try to get more information out of Mattie.
47	10	"Sister Spycraft"	5:55	July 2, 2015
Mattie, chatting with Carmilla, comments that "the student body won't be a problem for much longer". Laura and her friends head to the anglerfish crater and find an excavation team from the Corvae Corporation looking for a "first gate". Kirsch bursts in, looking for a place to hide.
48	11	"Adonis Interrupted"	4:18	July 7, 2015
Kirsch describes how he was hunted in the Adonis Hunt. Mel enters, ready to loose an arrow at him, but Danny intervenes.
49	12	"Enter the Lugenbaron"	6:36	July 9, 2015
Laura meets with the Voice of Silas's inside source and member of the Silas Board, Baron Vordenberg. Perry then arrives, followed by someone who appears to be Will.
50	13	"Emergency Procedures"	4:43	July 14, 2015
LaFontaine explains that they managed to transfer J.P. into Will's body. Vordenberg expresses reluctance to help Laura, on account of her association with Carmilla.
51	14	"Sous Les Paves"	4:29	July 16, 2015
Laura and Danny try starting a student protest, but it goes nowhere. A cloud of crows swarms Perry. Mattie is confident in her power as the Board Chair, but J.P. brings up the Board's requirement of a student representative. Laura encourages Carmilla to become the representative, but she refuses.
52	15	"No Heroics"	6:50	July 21, 2015
Carmilla breaks up with Laura, unwilling to go against Mattie and fed up with Laura's expectations and seeming unwillingness to listen to her protests on the matter. Danny becomes the student representative on the Board.
53	16	"Old Habits"	4:09	July 23, 2015
Carmilla continues living in the apartment, her terrible roommate habits becoming apparent once more. Danny reports that Mattie is passing a vote tomorrow; with additional information from J.P., they infer that Mattie intends to sell off parts of the student body's bodies.
54	17	"The Great Debate Prep"	4:37	July 28, 2015
J.P. discovers that the Board Chair can be removed if "bested by another board member in conflict". They try to get Vordenberg ready for verbal debate, but success looks unlikely. Perry then comes in to share some new files she found.
55	18	"Coup De Grace"	5:32	July 30, 2015
During the debate, Laura blackmails Mattie with incriminating files, resulting in her defeat. Vordenberg takes her place as Board Chair, and subsequently orders the detainment of all known and suspected vampires.
56	19	"Dividing Lines"	5:59	August 4, 2015
Vordenberg's anti-vampire agenda gets followers from among the campus. Carmilla continues to act out. Perry laments the strange and dangerous events that she's caught up in; J.P. and LaFontaine console her. Mattie barges into the apartment carrying a wounded Carmilla.
57	20	"Damage Control"	4:19	August 6, 2015
Laura calls LaFontaine and J.P. to help Carmilla, and lets her and Mattie hide out at the apartment. In exchange for this, Mattie agrees that she and Carmilla will stop their predatory spree. Perry reports that Vordenberg's troops are on their way over.
58	21	"Prisoner's Dilemma"	5:11	August 11, 2015
Mattie and Carmilla hide under the floorboards to avoid being caught by Vordenberg's patrol. After they reemerge, Perry returns with holy water and starts throwing it on Mattie.
59	22	"Compulsory Violence"	5:55	August 13, 2015
Mattie knocks out Perry; Laura manages to stop her from doing anything more, almost getting strangled in the process. Later that night, Laura and Carmilla have a talk. Carmilla tells Laura about Mattie's weakness, in case Mattie tries to kill her again.
60	23	"Wild Kingdom"	4:54	August 18, 2015
Classes have resumed, with changes to the curriculum made by Vordenberg. Laura describes life with the three vampires as if narrating a wildlife documentary. Danny comes by alone, with a box of apples, which she shares with Laura. Fresh food has been scarce on campus since the events of the previous semester. Danny reveals that she has fallen out of favor with the Summer Society since interfering with the Adonis Hunt, and that she has nowhere to go, and expresses doubt about Vordenberg's leadership. LaFontaine appears, announcing that Vordenberg's minions have been rounding up the protestors around the anglerfish pit, and that it seems to be killing them.
61	24	"Hunger Games"	4:12	August 20, 2015
LaFontaine explains that Zetas and townsfolk were moving people away from the pit; this caused some of the protestors to go into fits. Danny and Laura try getting information out of Kirsch about the Zetas, but he doesn't know anything. Next, they turn to the vampires, offering them blood for information. Mattie claims not to know about Vordenberg's plans. Before they can get any further with her, J.P. gives in to his hunger and tackles LaFontaine.
62	25	"Bluster and Consequences"	4:09	August 25, 2015
Danny pulls J.P. off of LaFontaine. Laura continues interrogating Mattie. Mattie has the idea for her and Carmilla to sneak past the Baron's patrols to get a weapon, though she won't elaborate to Laura or the others. Laura, being untrusting of Mattie, divulges her secret weakness to Danny.
63	26	"Concerned Parties"	5:00	August 27, 2015
Mattie heads to the crater to drink the blood of Lophiiformes in hopes of gaining the power to fight Vordenberg and his forces. Laura rounds up the gang to stop her; they split up and head out, with Perry remaining behind in case Mattie returns, and expressing some concerns to Danny before she leaves.
64	27	"Zones of Friendship"	6:34	September 1, 2015
The search for Mattie turns up nothing. Kirsch asks Danny about their relationship and reports some equipment in the crater meant for killing the anglerfish. They decide that later that night, they will sneak down to the crater to sabotage the machine. Laura and Carmilla have a talk about their relationship before leaving. Perry, who stayed behind, is talking to Laura's webcam when Mattie appears behind her.
65	28	"Spilled Blood"	4:44	September 3, 2015
Laura and friends return to find Mattie passed out with blood on her hands and mouth, and Perry missing. They check the webcam footage to find out what happened: Mattie was talking about Perry being sent messages and dreams by someone, when Perry turned to her and started speaking a doomsday prophecy – the feed then cuts out. Vordenberg then walks in, having been led there by Danny after she found several Summers murdered.
66	29	"Godslayer"	4:56	September 8, 2015
Vordenberg reveals his ambition to kill the anglerfish god, despite having promised Danny to leave it alone. LaFontaine and Kirsch are momentarily possessed and speak of doomsday. Mattie reaches for Vordenberg but is stopped by Danny; she responds by twisting and breaking her arm. Danny snatches Mattie's locket – her weakness – and stomps on it.
67	30	"Co-Existence"	5:14	September 10, 2015
Mattie dies in Carmilla's arms and Carmilla warns Danny to run as she will kill her. Danny refuses to run but before Carmilla can attack, Laura steps in the way and reveals that she told Danny how to kill Mattie. Fueled with rage, Carmilla realizes she was a fool and tells everyone to stay away from her or she will kill them. She then leaves.
68	31	"Siege Tactics"	4:43	September 15, 2015
Perry returns to the manor, having no memory of what happened to her. Over the Silas PA system, Vordenberg announces the death of the anglerfish, and then has his army attack the manor, revealing Laura and the gang as traitors. Laura is completely distraught over betraying Carmilla and calls herself a hypocrite. Later on after a siege attempt, which Laura and the gang barely survive, Perry comes into the room with books and tells Laura that they need to do some research. Suddenly screams are heard as they witness Carmilla, in her giant black cat form, murdering people and making her way to the anglerfish crater.
69	32	"Radio Letter"	3:34	September 17, 2015
After witnessing Carmilla's failed attempt to get to the anglerfish crater, LaFontaine points out how Laura has been doing more pining then reporting. Realising this, Laura does another SNN report, in which she informs the students of Silas about how Vordenberg has been lying to them. Later on, the group are looking through reports trying to find anything about Vordenberg, but have nothing. When LaFontaine says about looking at the 1904 Board Meetings, where they discover that the Dean had put in a motion in killing the Anglerfish but was outvoted. Laura then realizes that Mattie had all the information in how to kill all the board members and that somewhere in the files is the key in defeating Vordenberg.
70	33	"Just In Case"	3:43	September 22, 2015
Perry suggests working with Corvae, and, when that idea is shot down, brings up the Silas Charter that gives the Board Chair their power. Theo and Mel call at that moment, asking for help in overturning Vordenberg. They offer to sneak Danny to the catacombs where hundreds of Silas students are being kept so that she can persuade them to fight; Theo and Mel would then go rally their own troops to fight as well. Though wary of it being a trap, Danny decides to go.
71	34	"Last Call"	5:16	September 24, 2015
Laura calls Carmilla to ask her to help, admitting that she was wrong to push her ideas of heroism on her. Carmilla hangs up on her, and Laura, accepting this, leaves to help Danny and the freed students. Carmilla calls back to ask what Laura wants her to do, but with Laura gone, Perry takes the call instead. Perry tells her that Laura doesn't want to speak to her, then hangs up and leaves.
72	35	"Not Afraid"	5:47	September 29, 2015
Laura and Danny bring an injured Kirsch back to the apartment, then Danny goes back into the hallway to fight. As she returns from victory to stand in the doorway, Theo stabs her in the back. He explains that Vordenberg offered the Zetas a deal to make them his right hand forces. Mel joins them just as Danny dies in Laura's arms. Laura tells her to surrender to spare the lives of the Summers, seeing as it's what Danny would've wanted. Mel accepts, in return for safe passage from the Zetas to bring Danny's body away for funeral rites. Later, Laura is sitting in the room alone when LaFontaine, Perry and J.P. return — she tells them about Danny's death. Over the PA, Vordenberg announces his victory and the impending execution of Carmilla. As the announcement ends, he appears in person at the doorway.
73	36	"The Execution of Carmilla Karnstein"	16:06	October 1, 2015
Vordenberg drags in a chained and cuffed Carmilla into the room and prepares to execute her. However, Perry hands Laura the Silas Charter, which, when destroyed, will disintegrate the Baron. Laura, prepared to do anything to protect Carmilla, threatens the Baron with the charter. Vordenberg dismisses her threats, claiming she would not do anything so foolish because as he puts it, he and Laura are the same: they believe not in the harsh truth in the world, but a good story, and killing him is not what a heroine does. Corvae will still get Silas, undoing everything she and her friends have fought and died for, and all of this will be in the name of saving Carmilla, harkening back to Laura's own refusal to accept that Carmilla changed her ways in the name of saving Laura and not the world. However, to everyone's shock, Laura makes good on her threats, destroying the charter, killing the Baron, and ultimately handing over the campus to Corvae. The group tries to evacuate through the secret passages, but in the chaos Perry disappears and J.P. stays behind to look for her. Only LaFontaine, Laura, and Carmilla manage to escape, hiding out in the remains of the library. As Carmilla comforts Laura over all they have lost over the past few months, it dawns on her that in the end everything worked out for her dead mother: the Silas Board is no longer a threat, Corvae controls the campus, and the angler fish is dead. Laura scoffs at the sheer absurdity of this, as the Dean is supposedly long-dead. However, Carmilla's stunned silence forces the two to realize that the Dean is still alive. After the credits, the Dean reveals herself to Laura's former audience as having possessed Perry, explaining the Floor Don's strange behavior since her return from the crater. She also confesses to the murders of the Voice of Silas staff and the Summers. She has Kirsch retrieve Danny from the funeral pyre, and, after, reciting an incantation, resurrects the former Summer Society member. Danny, now a vampire, starts drinking Kirsch's blood as the Dean mockingly warns the audience of what's to come. As the Dean recites the resurrection incantation, Mattie suddenly wakes up. She grasps for the locket she used to stay immortal, but quickly realizes it is gone.

=== Season Zero (2015) ===
It was announced on October 1, 2015, following the release of the season two finale, that a Season Zero would air on October 22, 2015 on the Vervegirl YouTube channel. It will be consisted of 12 episodes. The first episode premiered on the Vervegirl channel but the rest of the season premiered on the U by Kotex YouTube channel.

No. overall	No. in season	Title	Running time (in minutes)	Original release date
74	1	"Blast from the Past"	5:59	October 22, 2015
75	2	"A Bro's Tale"	5:15	October 22, 2015
76	3	"Lucy & Ethel"	5:25	October 27, 2015
77	4	"No One Expects"	4:45	October 29, 2015
78	5	"The Missing... Link"	4:47	November 3, 2015
79	6	"Suspicious Minds"	1:58	November 5, 2015
80	7	"Lock-in"	3:29	November 10, 2015
81	8	"Blood, Where Art Thou?"	4:08	November 12, 2015
82	9	"The Trouble With Tinkerbell"	4:33	November 17, 2015
83	10	"Wishin' & Hopin'"	3:47	November 19, 2015
84	11	"Clap If You Believe In…"	4:09	November 24, 2015
85	12	"Nothing To See Here"	6:34	November 24, 2015

=== Season 3 (2016) ===
It was announced in early September 2016 that the third season of Carmilla would be its last. It featured 36 episodes and, unlike previous seasons, airing of the episodes was split into three acts, with the first act containing the first 17 episodes announced to premiere on KindaTV's YouTube channel on September 15, 2016. Act II premiered on September 29, 2016 and Act III premiered on October 13, 2016 with the series' final episodes.

No. overall	No. in season	Title	Running time (in minutes)	Original release date
Act I
86	1	"I Know What You Didn't Do Last Summer"	6:30	September 15, 2016
87	2	"Bad Blood"	4:43	September 15, 2016
88	3	"Checkpoint"	5:36	September 15, 2016
89	4	"Relative Positions"	2:55	September 15, 2016
90	5	"Raiders of the Lost Heart"	5:10	September 15, 2016
91	6	"Best Laid Plans"	9:56	September 15, 2016
92	7	"By The Book"	5:25	September 15, 2016
93	8	"All The Rage"	3:49	September 15, 2016
94	9	"Meet The Parent"	5:45	September 15, 2016
95	10	"Crossroads"	6:15	September 15, 2016
96	11	"What Fresh Intel Is This?"	6:31	September 15, 2016
97	12	"Memory Lane"	10:44	September 15, 2016
98	13	"Warning Signs"	5:48	September 15, 2016
99	14	"Order of Magnitude"	4:51	September 15, 2016
100	15	"Risk Assessments"	6:33	September 15, 2016
101	16	"Regrets, I've Had A Few"	5:53	September 15, 2016
102	17	"Demon Summoning Made Simple"	8:26	September 15, 2016
Act II
103	18	"The Heart of The Matter"	6:25	September 29, 2016
104	19	"Coping Strategies"	11:06	September 29, 2016
105	20	"Circular Logic"	5:41	September 29, 2016
106	21	"The Exorcism of Lola Perry"	5:47	September 29, 2016
107	22	"Fun and Mind Games"	7:13	September 29, 2016
108	23	"Family Feud"	6:49	September 29, 2016
109	24	"Break On Through"	4:18	September 29, 2016
Act III
110	25	"… To The Other Side"	5:46	October 13, 2016
111	26	"Objects in the Rearview Mirror"	5:40	October 13, 2016
112	27	"If You're Lost, You Can Look"	7:25	October 13, 2016
113	28	"Time After Time"	5:00	October 13, 2016
114	29	"Back to the Total Lack of Future"	6:36	October 13, 2016
115	30	"Narrowing Paths"	5:05	October 13, 2016
116	31	"Long Goodbyes"	6:20	October 13, 2016
117	32	"Places to Go, People to See"	8:16	October 13, 2016
118	33	"A God Walks Into A Giant Pit…"	5:32	October 13, 2016
119	34	"They Blinded Me With Science"	4:22	October 13, 2016
120	35	"Hell Hath No Fury"	7:44	October 13, 2016
121	36	"Post Apocalypse"	13:16	October 13, 2016
