= In a Glass Darkly =

1872 collection of five short stories by Sheridan Le Fanu

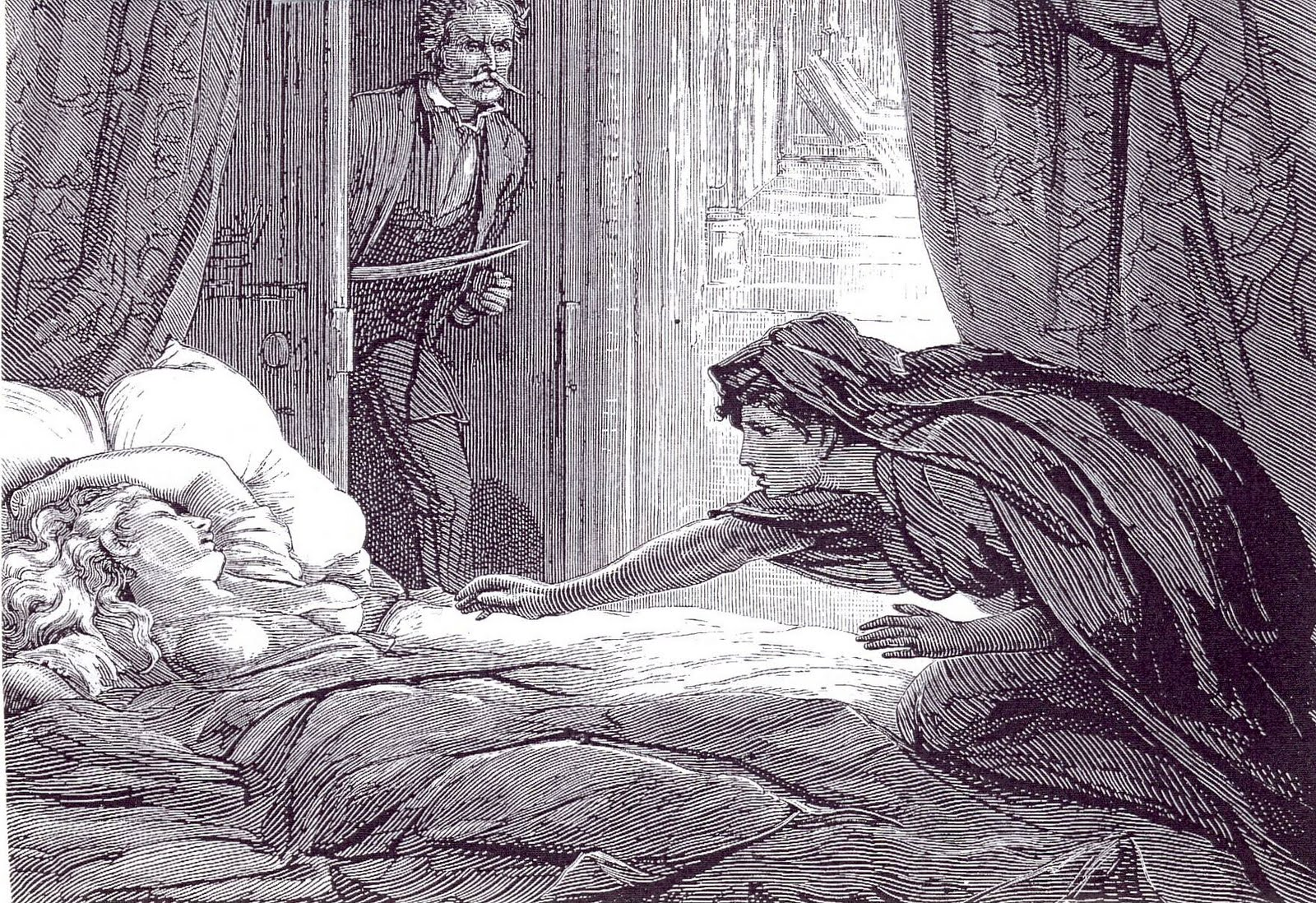
- Illustration of Carmilla from The Dark Blue by David Henry Friston, 1872.
- Author: Sheridan Le Fanu
- Language: English
- Genre: Gothic horror, mystery
- Publisher: Richard Bentley & Son
- Publication date: 1872
- Publication place: Ireland
- Media type: Paperback, Hardback
- Pages: 384
- Text: In a Glass Darkly at Wikisource

In a Glass Darkly is a collection of five stories by the Irish author Sheridan Le Fanu, first published in 1872, the year before his death. The second and third stories are revised versions of previously published stories. The first three stories are short stories, and the fourth and fifth are long enough to be called novellas (the fourth is over 44,500 words long, and the fifth is over 27,500 words long).

The five stories are related to the horror, mystery and suspense genre. In Green Tea, a man named Mr. Jennings begins seeing a monkey, which he believes is causing his madness. The Familiar follows a retired sea captain in Dublin who is stalked by a strangely familiar man for a sin in his past.

Mr. Justice Harbottle tells the story of a bad judge who faces supernatural punishment for his evil actions. The Room in the Dragon Volant is about an Englishman who gets caught up in a dangerous mystery involving a woman and a haunted room in France. Finally, Carmilla is one of the earliest known works of vampire literature, predating Bram Stoker's Dracula (1897) by 25 years.

The book's title is an allusion to 1 Corinthians 13:12, a Biblical passage which describes humanity as perceiving the world "through a glass, darkly".

== Stories ==
The stories, which belong to the Gothic horror and mystery genres, are presented as selections from the posthumous papers of the occult detective Dr. Martin Hesselius.

=== Green Tea ===
An English clergyman named Jennings confides to Hesselius that he is being followed by a demon in the form of an ethereal monkey, invisible to everyone else, which is trying to invade his mind and destroy his life. Hesselius writes letters to a Dutch colleague about the victim's condition, which gets steadily worse with time as the creature steps up its methods, all of which are purely psychological. The title refers to Hesselius' belief that green tea was what unsealed Jennings's "inner eye" and led to the haunting. Emanuel Swedenborg's book Arcana Cœlestia (1749) is cited on the power of demons.

=== The Familiar ===
A revised version of "The Watcher" (1851). A sea captain, living in Dublin, is stalked by "The Watcher", a strange dwarf who resembles a person from his past. He starts to hear accusatory voices all about him and eventually his fears solidify in the form of a sinister bird, a pet owl owned by his fiancée, Miss Montague.

=== Mr. Justice Harbottle ===
A cruel judge in the Court of Common Pleas, Elijah Harbottle, finds himself under attack by vengeful spirits, and in a disturbing dream he is condemned to death by a monstrous doppelgänger. The story is set between 1746 and 1748 and is retold by a Londoner, called Anthony Harman, from the account related in letters by an elderly friend.

=== The Room in the Dragon Volant ===
Not a ghost story but a notable mystery story, in 26 chapters, which includes the elements of drug-induced catalepsy and premature burial. A naïve young Englishman travelling in France attempts to save a beautiful and mysterious woman whom he is duped into believing to be the unhappily-married wife of the avaricious and sexagenarian count of St. Alyre. In the denouement it is revealed that the 'St. Alyres' belong to a gang of murderous thieves who bury their victims alive, having first paralysed them with a mysterious drug. The hero, young Richard Beckett, besotted with the gang's actress accomplice, narrowly escapes becoming the latest victim of their dastardly scheme. In the prologue Le Fanu describes the catalepsy-inducing drug employed by the St. Alyres as one of a class of 25 or so philtres known to mediaeval physicians, two of which are still used by the criminals of Dr. Hesselius’s day. The effects of the (fictional) drug, however, are curiously reminiscent of those of the alkaloid bulbocapnine, which occurs in the medicinal herb Corydalis cava, a plant known to mediaeval herbalists.

=== Carmilla ===
A tale of a female vampire, set in Styria, Austria. This story was of great influence on Bram Stoker in writing Dracula (1897). It also served as the basis for several works in other media, such as Danish director Carl Theodor Dreyer's film Vampyr (1932); Hammer's film The Vampire Lovers (1970); Carmilla, a Canadian web series starring Natasha Negovanlis and Elise Bauman; and The Curse of Styria (2014).

== Reception ==
In a letter to Sidney Colvin from W. E. Henley, Henley stated that his friend Robert Louis Stevenson admired the book. Henley said "In a Glass Darkly was a book for which R.L.S. had a profound respect." Henley also said that the book had inspired his and Stevenson's play, The Hanging Judge.
