= Carmilla (disambiguation) =

Carmilla is a Gothic novella by Joseph Sheridan Le Fanu.

Carmilla may also refer to:

== Comics ==
- Carmilla, a 1991 Aircel Comics miniseries by Steven Jones and John Ross
- Carmilla (web series), a Canadian web series based on the novella

=== Characters in comics ===
- Carmilla Black, Marvel Comics character
- Carmilla Carmine, Hazbin Hotel character
- Carmilla Frost, Marvel Comics character
- Carmilla (Re:Zero), a character in the light novel series Re:Zero − Starting Life in Another World
- Carmilla (Castlevania), a character in the Castlevania series
- Carmilla, a character in Vampire Hunter D
- Carmilla, an Assassin-class Servant appearing in Fate/Grand Order based on the eponymous character in Le Fanu's work

== Film ==
- Carmilla (film), a 2019 British film
- The Carmilla Movie, a 2017 Canadian film based on the web series

== Music ==
- "Carmilla", a single by Australian singer Jon English
- "Carmilla", a single by Japanese vocalist Kaya
- "Carmilla", a song by Italian band Theatres des Vampires, from Moonlight Waltz

== Other uses ==
- "Carmilla", episode of the 1989 TV series Nightmare Classics

== See also ==
- Carmila, Queensland
- Camilla (disambiguation)
