= Ellen Simpson =

Canadian writer

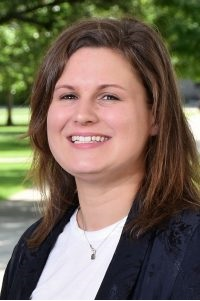
Ellen Simpson, University of Colorado Boulder Information Science PhD student

Ellen Simpson is an American writer and scholar. She is known for her work as story editor and social media writer for the web series Carmilla. She has published several novels with Ylva Publishing and scholarly articles in the areas of human computer interaction (HCI), queer theory in HCI and the impact of sociotechnical systems on behavior and identity. Simpson is a lesbian.

== Career ==
In 2014, Simpson developed the web series Carmilla with Jordan Hall for SmokeBomb Entertainment.

The series premiered on the Vervegirl (rebranded as 'KindaTV' as of January 2016) YouTube channel on August 19, 2014.U by Kotex is the executive producer of the web series. The series takes place at the fictional Silas University in Styria, Austria and is told through video journals (Vlogs) recorded by Laura, a first-year student. The first and second seasons each consist of 36 three to seven-minute episodes. A twelve-episode prequel mini-season, "season zero," was announced just after the release of the final episode of season 2. In 2016, the series won a Canadian Screen Award as well as Rockie Award for Branded Content at the Banff World Media Festival.

Simpson received their PhD from the department of Information Science at the University of Colorado Boulder, completed postdoctoral research with the Sloane Lab at the University of Virginia School of Data Science and is currently assistant professor of communication at the University of Alaska Southeast Ketchikan campus.
