= Camilla =

Camilla may refer to:

== People ==
- Camilla (given name), including a list of people with the name
- Queen Camilla (b. 1947), wife of Charles III, king of the Commonwealth realms

=== Characters ===
- Camilla (mythology), daughter of King Metabus and Casmilla in Roman mythology
- Camilla, a character in The Muppet Show

== Places ==
- Camilla, Georgia, US
- Hallyards Castle or Camilla Castle, Scotland
- 107 Camilla, an asteroid

== Arts and entertainment ==
- Camilla (1994 film)
- Camilla (1954 film)
- Camilla (Burney novel), 1796, by Frances Burney (mentioned in Jane Austen's novel Northanger Abbey)
- Camilla Dickinson, a.k.a. Camilla, a novel by Madeleine L'Engle
- "Camilla", a song by Basshunter from Now You're Gone – The Album

=== Opera ===
- Camilla (Bononcini), a 1706 opera by Giovanni Bononcini
- Camilla (Paer), 1799 opera by Ferdinando Paer
- Camilla (Fioravanti), 1801 opera by Valentino Fioravanti
- Il trionfo di Camilla, a 1696 or 1697 opera by Giovanni Bononcini

== Transportation and vehicles ==
- Camilla (spacecraft), proposed to visit 10199 Chariklo
- HMS Camilla, two ships of the Royal Navy
- MV Camilla Desgagnés, or Camilla, a freight ship

== Other uses ==
- Camilla (fly), genus of flies from the family Camillidae
- Camilla, preoccupied name for Camillina, a genus of spiders
- Camilla, a fashion brand launched by Camilla Franks

== See also ==
- Camellia, the genus that includes tea, Camellia sinensis
- Queen Camilla (disambiguation)
- Camille (disambiguation)
- Carmilla (disambiguation)
- Camila (disambiguation)
