= Camila =

Camila is the Portuguese and Spanish form of the given name Camilla and may refer to:

== Film and television ==
- Camila (TV series), a Mexican telenovela from 1998
- Camila (film), a 1984 Argentine film by María Luisa Bemberg

== Music ==
- Camila (band), Mexican band
- Camila (album), Camila Cabello's debut studio album released 2018
- "Camila, Camila", a song by Brazilian rock band Nenhum de Nós

== Other uses ==
- Camila (Pontus), a town of ancient Pontus, in Anatolia
- Camila (footballer) (born 1994), Brazilian footballer known by the mononym Camila
- Camila, brand name of a progestogen-only pill containing norethisterone (norethindrone)

== See also ==
- Camilla (disambiguation)
