= Carmilla (web series) =

Canadian web series

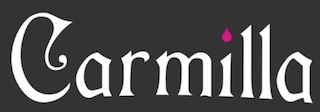
- Genre: Comedy-drama; Mystery
- Created by: Jordan Hall; Steph Ouaknine; Jay Bennett
- Based on: Carmilla by Joseph Sheridan Le Fanu
- Developed by: Jordan Hall; Ellen Simpson
- Written by: Jordan Hall (seasons 1–3); Ellen Simpson (season 0)
- Directed by: Spencer Maybee
- Starring: Elise Bauman; Natasha Negovanlis; Sharon Belle; K Alexander; Annie M. Briggs; Matt O'Connor; Aaron Chartrand; Nicole Stamp; Shannon Kook; Sophia Walker; Ian D. Clark
- Opening theme: "Love Will Have Its Sacrifices" performed by SOLES
- Country of origin: Canada
- No. of seasons: 3
- No. of episodes: 121 (list of episodes)

Production
- Executive producers: U by Kotex; Jay Bennett
- Producers: Ted Biggs; Stephanie Ouaknine
- Editor: Dillon Taylor
- Camera setup: Single-camera
- Running time: 3-16 minutes
- Production companies: Smokebomb Entertainment; Shift2

Original release
- Release: August 19, 2014 – October 13, 2016

Carmilla is a Canadian single-frame web series co-created by Jordan Hall, Steph Ouaknine, and Jay Bennett. The series stars Elise Bauman and Natasha Negovanlis, and is loosely based on the novella of the same name by Sheridan Le Fanu. The series premiered on the Vervegirl (rebranded as KindaTV as of January 2016) YouTube channel on August 19, 2014. U by Kotex is the executive producer of the web series. The series takes place at the fictional Silas University in Styria, Austria, and is told through vlogs recorded by Laura, a first-year student. When Laura begins investigating the disappearance of her roommate, she is assigned a new roommate named Carmilla.

The first and second seasons each consist of 36 one to seven-minute episodes. A twelve-episode prequel mini-season, "season zero," was announced just after the release of the final episode of season 2. On February 13, 2016, it was announced that Carmilla would air its third and final season in the summer of 2016. The third season was eventually released in September and October 2016, in three acts. On October 6, 2016, it was announced that there would be a movie that would take place five years after the end of the third season. The film, called The Carmilla Movie, was released in 2017. At the Canadian Screen Awards in 2018, it was announced by Elise Bauman that an unnamed prime time series was in development.

In 2016, the series won a Canadian Screen Award and a Rockie Award for Branded Content at the Banff World Media Festival. As of August 2017, Carmilla had generated over 70 million views on YouTube.

== Plot ==
=== Season 1 ===
The series is told through a fictional vlog broadcast by Laura Hollis, a freshman studying journalism who has decided to document her college experience. When her roommate Betty suddenly goes missing at a swim team party, Laura is assigned a new roommate, Carmilla Karnstein, whom Laura describes as "broody."

Laura, aided by her friends, discovers that her former roommate is not the only girl to have abruptly gone missing from Silas. The season follows Laura's investigation and her relationship with Carmilla, which progresses from hostile to romantic over the course of the season. Meanwhile, the university's mysterious dean is up to something that can't be good.

=== Story between seasons ===
Between the first and second seasons, series story editor Ellen Simpson published additional story content. Canon Twitter accounts under Laura, Carmilla, and LaFontaine's names relay the group's encounters with supernatural Styrian dangers while trying to escape the Silas campus.

Between stories on the Twitter accounts, a Christmas special was released detailing the group's not-so-pleasant encounter with a seemingly-pleasant Mama Klaus.

=== Season 2 ===
The second season begins with Laura, Carmilla, LaFontaine, and Perry's return to the Silas campus following the Dean's defeat. Laura decides to investigate the murder of several members of the newspaper staff. Other strange occurrences on campus draw the attention of Carmilla's adoptive sister Mattie and the Silas Board of Governors. Laura and her friends decide to launch an election to replace Mattie as the Chair of the Board with a kindly old baron.

New characters include:

- Matska "Mattie" Belmonde, Carmilla's adoptive vampiric sister and chair of the Silas Board of Governors.
- Baron Vordenberg, the descendant of a vampire hunter whose family was murdered by Carmilla 300 years prior.
- Melanippe "Mel" Callis, a sister in the Summer Society.
- Theodore "Theo" Straka, a brother in Zeta Omega Mu.

=== Season Zero ===
A teaser trailer announcing this season was released on October 1, 2015. This season consisted of 12 episodes instead of in previous, where there was 36 episodes. All the episodes except the first episode were released on U by Kotex's YouTube channel.

While Carmilla and Laura are trapped in the library, they watch VHS tapes that document interactions between Carmilla, Perry, and Mel while they are trapped in a room where U by Kotex brand tampons are stored. These events occur a year before Laura is a student at Silas University.

=== Season 3 ===
The series was renewed for a third and final season on February 13, 2016. It premiered on September 15, 2016 and finished on October 13, 2016.

This season's episodes were released differently than in previous seasons. Season three was released in three acts with several episodes released within each act. Act I consisted of episodes 1–17, Act II was episodes 18–24, and Act III was episodes 25–36.

Laura and her friends face the Dean yet again, who has now possessed Perry and intends to open the gates of Hell. Laura and her friends spend most their time hiding out in the sentient campus library, that has been mentioned in previous seasons. They are in search of a way, once and for all, to stop the Dean. New characters include Sherman Hollis, Laura's father.

Extra content from this season includes: Mel's transmissions from the pit. Thirteen podcasts of Mel, detailing the daily life and several different events that happen while the students of Silas University are trapped in the pit digging for the dean.

=== Film ===
A feature-length film based on the series was produced in 2017 and premiered on October 26, 2017 in theatres across Canada. It is available to stream via VHX. It also appeared on the platform Fullscreen before the site shut down.

A teaser trailer for the film was released on October 6, 2016, and an extended trailer was added at the end of the web series finale. A teaser trailer was released September 2, 2017. The movie is going to take place five years after the events of season three.

Natasha Negovanlis and Elise Bauman were confirmed to reprise their roles. This is the second film that the two have co-starred in, the first being Almost Adults, created by The Gay Women Channel, a channel on YouTube. According to news first reported by Variety, the following actresses and actors appeared in the film: Dominique Provost-Chalkley, Grace Lynn Kung, Cara Gee, Annie Briggs, K Alexander, Nicole Stamp, and Matt O'Connor.

The movie takes place five years after the final events on season three. Laura and Carmilla have moved in together in an apartment in Toronto, Ontario. Post-graduation, Laura has felt rather unsuccessful with her journalism career thus far. After experiencing lucid dreams in a Victorian setting, Laura notices supernatural events are occurring in her life again. Carmilla has once again become a vampire after a mysterious meeting with a supernatural-therapist. Perry and LaFontaine own a start-up, Danny is a vampire rights activist, and Mel and Kirsch have joined Laura in journalism. Laura and Carmilla, along with Perry, LaFontaine, Mel, and Kirsch travel back to Styria, Austria to the Victorian mansion Laura has been dreaming of. Along with the ghosts of Carmilla's former victims, they fight the ghost of Carmilla's ex-lover in order to regain Carmilla's humanity.

== Episodes ==
The first season of Carmilla consists of 36 episodes, which aired from August 19, 2014 to December 2, 2014. A Christmas special aired on December 24, 2014. The second season of Carmilla consists of 36 episodes, which aired from June 2, 2015 to October 1, 2015. The next season, titled Season Zero, consists of 12 episodes, which began airing on October 22, 2015 and concluded on November 24, 2015.

The third and final season of Carmilla consists of 36 episodes and was split into three acts. Act I, which contains the first 17 episodes of the season, aired on September 15, 2016. Act II contains episodes 18-24 and aired on September 29, 2016. Act III contains episodes 25-36 and aired on October 13, 2016.

== Cast and characters ==
Due to budgetary constraints, the actors cast in season one were not members of ACTRA, a Canadian labor union for artists and performers. During pre-production for the second season, it was announced that the show would be financially able to support its actors in joining ACTRA, and several actors of color had been cast as new characters.

=== Main characters ===
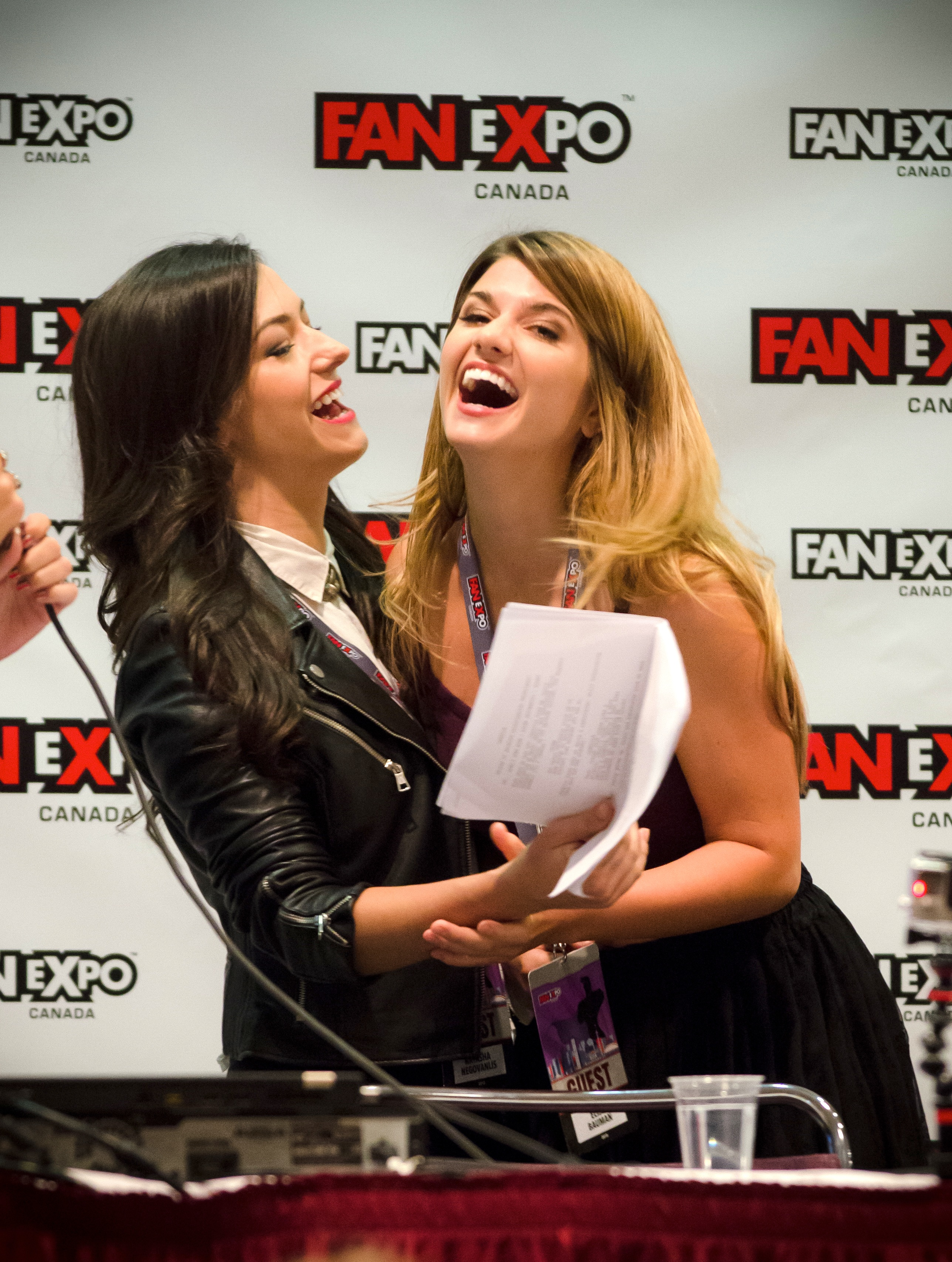
Negovanlis (left) and Bauman (right) at Fan Expo 2015

- Laura Eileen Hollis (played by Elise Bauman) is the sheltered and courageous protagonist. As the series begins, she is a 19-year-old journalism major at Silas. Despite her love of sugary foods, Laura is tiny and, as a child, was signed up for Krav Maga classes by her overprotective father so she, his only child, could learn how to defend herself. Though somewhat bookish and dorky, she is courageous and fiercely loyal to her friends. Laura enjoys various forms of pop culture, including Harry Potter, Buffy the Vampire Slayer and Doctor Who, and is deeply inspired by historical strong female icons. Laura does not hide her initial dislike towards Carmilla, but as the series progresses and after discovering who Carmilla truly is, she finds herself falling in love with her and the two enter into a relationship by season 2. They break up during that same season, but during season 3 are working towards getting back together. It is implied that Laura does not have a mother; if her family correlates with her character's family in the original novella, Laura's mother died when she was young. Little is known of her past and of Laura herself other than basic facts discovered in season 1, and the fact she is a lesbian.
- Countess Mircalla "Carmilla" von Karnstein (played by Natasha Negovanlis) is Laura's new roommate and the series' second protagonist. Born in Styria in 1680 as Mircalla Karnstein, the daughter of a Count, Carmilla was murdered at a ball and resurrected as a vampire, eternally aging her at 18. She is the "adopted" daughter of the Dean of Silas University, Lilita Morgan (also a vampire), who forces Carmilla to bring her girls to offer in sacrifice to the angler fish god in her cult. During the 1800s, Carmilla fell deeply in love with Elle, one of her mother's targets, and tried to prevent her sacrifice. When her mother revealed to Elle that Carmilla is a vampire, however, Elle rejected Carmilla. Carmilla was tortured and buried in a coffin full of blood for several decades, as punishment for disobeying her mother. She was freed during the Second World War when a bomb exploded and unearthed her coffin. Carmilla was eventually found by her mother and forced to continue entrapping girls. She was brought to Silas University and eventually becomes roommates with Laura Hollis, one of her mother's next targets. However, Carmilla becomes passionately drawn to Laura and vows not to let her mother harm her. Carmilla and Laura enter into a relationship by the end of season one, but it falls apart by the end of season 2. In season 3, the couple is working on rebuilding their trust. Carmilla is a strong willed, sarcastic, philosophy student who consistently fails to clean up after herself and often uses Laura's possessions without permission. She possesses supernatural strength and speed, pyrokinesis, and can transform into a giant black cat.
- Danielle "Danny" Lawrence (played by Sharon Belle) is a third year student and English Literature TA at Silas. She is a member of the Summer Society at the university and has a strong will to protect those she cares about. Danny is athletic and charming; from their first meeting she shows a romantic interest in Laura, which appeared to be returned; as season one progresses, however, Laura finds Danny's over-protectiveness to be suffocating and reminiscent of her father. Danny takes an immediate dislike to Carmilla, finding her to be rude and messy, but tries to hide this for Laura's sake. In Season 2, she and Laura's friendship is repaired and the two work together again. She becomes the Student Representative of the Board of Silas, but is later ostracized by the Summer Society when she protects Kirsch from the other Summers and later joins forces with Laura. During the finale of season 2, she is killed and then resurrected as a vampire under the Dean's orders. Initially, using Kirsch as human feeding bag, she offers him up to Laura and friends as a peace offering towards the end of season three.
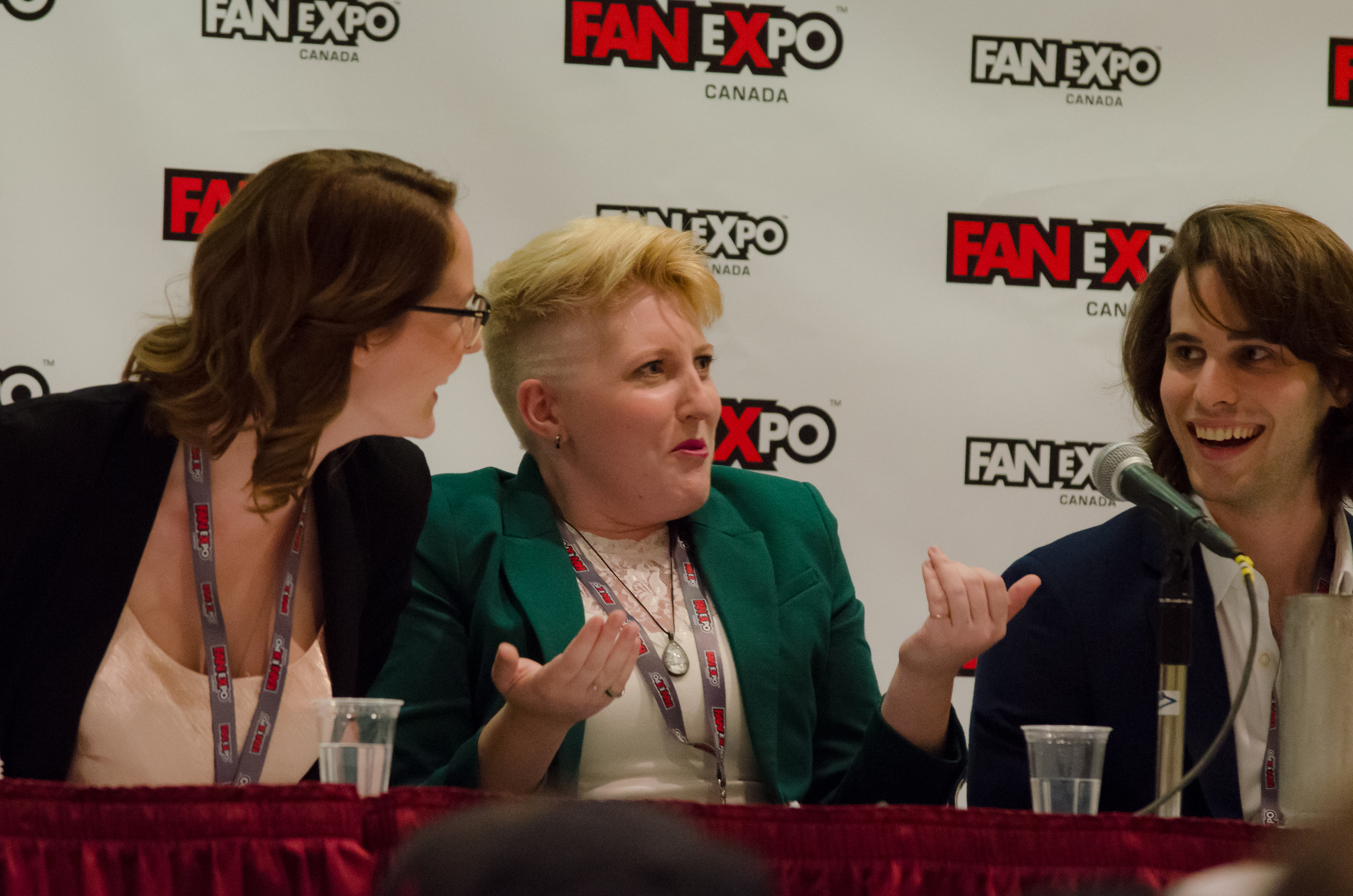
  Sharon Belle, K Alexander and Aaron Chartrand at Fan Expo 2015
- S. LaFontaine (played by K Alexander) is a non-binary student at Silas University and is Perry's best friend. They go by their last name, and are quick to correct anyone who calls them 'Susan'. After episode 26, creators and cast confirmed on tumblr that LaFontaine's pronouns are they/them/their. They are a biology major and one of the few characters not put off by the supernatural and strange aspects of Silas University. They are known to be a truth-speaker, being very observant, e.g. LaFontaine was the first to accuse Carmilla of being a vampire and concluded that the house Laura and Carmilla inhabited in Season Two was Carmilla's Mother's. During season 1, they were kidnapped by the Dean as a message to Laura. Laura mentions that she thinks LaFontaine and J.P. are dating, but it is never confirmed by either. In season 3, they clearly explicitly state they are non-binary. They lose an eye in the process of saving Perry from the Dean.
- Lola Perry (played by Annie M. Briggs) is a German major at Silas University, LaFontaine's roommate, and Laura and Carmilla's floor don. Regularly referred to as simply 'Perry', she is caring and nurturing, and often mothering her friends and classmates. She has a strong urge for constant order and fiercely believes in normality. She initially refuses to believe that Carmilla is a vampire, coming up with various excuses for Carmilla's strange behavior. She states in the Christmas Special that she celebrates Hanukkah, making her the only explicitly non-Christian character on the show to date. She's hinted to have feelings for LaFontaine, whom she's known since grade school. In Season Zero, set in 2012, Perry is shown to have an interest in the occult and new age practices, wearing flowers in her hair. In season 2, she has been possessed by Lilita Morgan, the Dean and Carmilla's adoptive mother, although this only becomes apparent towards the end of the season. She's rescued by Carmilla, Laura and Lafontaine at the end of season 3.
- Lilita Morgan (played by Sharon Belle, Elise Bauman and more commonly Annie M. Briggs) is the Dean of the Silas University and Carmilla's adoptive vampire mother. She is also revealed to be the Goddess Inanna during Season 3. She initially uses Carmilla to lure young girls to be her human sacrifice for the Angler Fish God. In Season 2, she possesses Perry and uses her in an attempt to open the gates of Hell to reunite with her former lover in Season 3.

=== Supporting characters ===
==== Series ====
- Wilson Kirsch (played by Matt O'Connor) is a student at Silas University and a member of the Zeta Omega Mu fraternity. Kirsch has a desire to protect others, and upon meeting Laura, nicknames her "Little Nerd" and designates himself as her "Zeta Omega Mu safety companion". He joins Laura and her friends in the search for the missing girls at Silas. In season 2 he's shown to have developed feelings for Danny, which she does not reciprocate, but he happily accepts being in the "friend zone". In season 3, he is being used as feeding bag for Danny, who is now a vampire. Despite being just sustenance for Danny, Kirsch is shown to still be a loyal friend to her.
- Will Luce (played by Aaron Chartrand) is a vampire, Zeta Omega Mu fraternity brother, and Kirsch's best friend. Also resurrected by the Dean, Will is Carmilla's younger brother. He refers to his sister as 'Kitty', and in return, is called 'Mama's Boy' for fulfilling the Dean's every request. Midway through season one, he attempts to attack Laura, but she is defended by Carmilla. He gets staked by Perry at the end of season one. His body is later used as shell to bring J.P. to life.
- Elizabeth "Betty" Anne Spielsdorf (played by Grace Glowicki) is Laura's original roommate. Betty, who initially appeared to be a care-free party girl was kidnapped by the Dean in the first episode of season one. After her disappearance, Laura vows to discover what happened to Betty. When Betty is finally rescued, it is revealed that she was brainwashed into coming to Silas, is very neat and intelligent, and was her high school valedictorian. After her return, she comes off as slightly rude and is attempting to transfer to Princeton University. In Season 3, she is seen as still following Laura's vlogs, and helps the group decipher some hieroglyphics written in a dead language.
- Sarah "SJ" Jane (played by Breton Lalama) is a pre-med student at Silas University. Sarah Jane was attending a swim team party when she went missing. She later reappeared, but couldn't remember what happened to her and eventually turned into a party animal. She began dating Kirsch, and while attending a party with him fell out of a third floor window during a botched attempt to summon her to the Dean. The fall resulted in her death.
- Natalie (played by Lisa Truong) is a student at Silas University and one of the girls who went missing. After initially returning, like Sarah Jane, she could not remember what happened to her and eventually turned into a party animal. She was attending the Peace Augsburg Luau when she went missing again. She was eventually saved by Laura and her friends at the end of season one.
- Elsie (played by Paige Haight) is a student at Silas University, Carmilla's 'study-buddy' in the beginning of the first season, and one of the girls who eventually went missing and was saved in season one. In season 3 she is seen again, being used as human labour for the Dean.
- J.P. Armitage (played by Dillon Taylor/Aaron Chartrand) is a student of Silas from the 1800s who was sucked into the computer system. J.P. originally resided in the library, but was transferred onto a flash drive by LaFontaine and is brought back to Laura's room. He aids Laura and her friends when they are researching information in order to find out how to stop the Dean's evil plan. His flash drive is destroyed by Carmilla's mother, The Dean, but later it is revealed that LaFontaine made a backup of J.P. on another flash drive. Laura mentions that she thinks LaFontaine and J.P. are dating at the end of season one, but this has yet to be confirmed by either of them. During the second season, the library disappears due to Matska taking charge at Silas and so does much of J.P. with it, until LaFontaine manages to bring him to life in Will's body after finding it on a trip to visit the Lustig crater. Due to the fact that the body J.P. inhabited is that of a vampire, he now possesses the same traits and abilities as the aforementioned supernatural. In Season 3, he is retained against his will by the Dean.
- Theodore "Theo" Straka (played by Shannon Kook) is a member of the Zeta Omega Mu fraternity and is introduced in the second season. He does not seem to get along well with the Summer Society, particularly with a Summer Society member called Mel, and is protective of his Zeta brothers. In Season 3, he joins the Corporation and starts working for the Dean.
- Melanippe "Mel" Callis (played by Nicole Stamp) is a member of the Summer Society and is introduced in the second season. In the second season, she is shown to be ambitious, fierce, loyal to her Summer Society sisters, brave, arrogant, and doesn't get along with Danny or the Zetas. Mel strives to claim the title of the president of the Summer Society the following year from Danny assuming her budding friendship with the Zetas and interactions with Laura and Carmilla will end up in her demotion once and for all. When Mel plans to kill Kirsch in the Adonis Hunt, Danny stops her, this allows Mel to win the election to become the president of the Summer Society, despite this she still takes orders from Danny who is the Student Representative of the Board of Silas. In Season Zero, set in 2012, Mel is shown to be shy and nerdy, wearing glasses and conservative clothing. In Season 3, she is trapped underground working for the Dean, and videoblogs her experience, in hopes of the troupe finding and rescuing her.
- Matska "Mattie" Belmonde (played by Sophia Walker) is the Chair of the Silas Board of Governors and was also resurrected by the Dean, making her Carmilla's older vampire sister. Her relationship with Carmilla is different than her mother and other siblings, where it shows the two have a great friendship and have had each other's backs for over 300 years. Despite this, Mattie often chides Carmilla over her relationship with Laura. When she loses her power as the Chair of the Silas Board to Vordenberg, she becomes a fugitive when Vordenberg orders the detainment of all known vampires. She is eventually killed by Danny, who only got the information to kill her from Laura who gained the information from Carmilla. Her death also sets Carmilla against Laura and the others. She is later revealed to be alive. In season three it is revealed that Mattie now has to work for a death goddess named Ereshkigal.
- Cornelius Hans Albrecht, Lugenbaron von Vordenberg (played by Ian D. Clark) was a member of the Silas Board of Governors. He is originally seen to be a kind old man who wishes to help Laura, but he has a great dislike for Carmilla, who murdered his ancestor's family over 300 years ago. When Laura helps Vordenberg become the Chair of the Silas Board, he reveals a more vindictive side of himself, when he orders the detainment of all known vampires. He was killed by Laura at the end of the second season.
- Sherman Hollis (played by Enrico Colantoni) is the father of Laura Hollis. He is an overprotective man whose main focus is protecting his daughter of all possible harm. At the beginning, he does not approve of Carmilla, who he thinks is the responsible for all the danger Laura has been put through during the last seasons. However, after a heart to heart talk that begins by him confronting her, Mr. Hollis comes to accept the vampire, even going as far as having a friendly discussion with her in which he narrates embarrassing stories of baby Laura. From then on, he starts helping the group.

==== Film ====
- Elle Sheridan (played by Dominique Provost-Chalkley) was the former lover of Carmilla Karnstein. Living in the mid-1800s in a Victorian manor, Elle fell in love with the girl her family had taken in, Carmilla Karnstein. After Carmilla's mother (who is revealed to be Lilita Morgan in the web series) reveals to Elle that Carmilla is a vampire, Elle becomes horrified and tricks Carmilla into revealing her true self to her. Elle leaves with Carmilla's mother, and from there is sacrificed to the angler fish god. Elle has been revealed by Steph Ouaknine to be the Laura in the original novel by J. Sheridan Le Fanu, who inspired the character's last name in the movie. She is the antagonist of the movie.
- Emily Brontë (played by Cara Gee) was a victim of Carmilla Karnstein, who murdered her before the events of the series took place. She appears in the Carmilla Movie, along with her sister, Charlotte, as a ghost in the old castle of the Sheridan family in Styria, Austria. Based on the poet of the same name, Emily appears to be welcoming and courteous to the new house guests. It is later revealed that all she wants is to pass away peacefully, and no longer be stuck in the 'nightmare land'. She works with Elle Sheridan in hopes that she will finally pass, but is tricked by her. At the end of the movie, she is able to finally pass.
- Charlotte Brontë (played by Grace Lynn Kung) was the sister of Emily Brontë, a victim of Carmilla Karnstein. She is also stuck in the ghost state that Carmilla's former victims were, despite not being a direct victim of the vampire. It is revealed in the movie that she was stuck in the same fate as her sister, as she died trying to save her. Charlotte, based on the poet of the same name, appears to be the less welcoming of the two Brontë sisters. She seems to be emotionless, until she forms a romantic bond with Mel. At the end of the movie, she is finally able to escape the 'nightmare land' she and the other ghosts were trapped in, and finally pass in peace.

== Reception ==
Carmilla has been praised by Dana Piccoli of AfterEllen for its near all-female cast and representation of various LGBT characters. In 2016, the series won a Canadian Screen Award and a Rockie Award for Branded Content at the Banff World Media Festival. Its use of LGBT characters and fantasy has earned it comparisons to the hit television show Buffy the Vampire Slayer.

=== Awards ===
Year	Award	Category	Result
2014	AfterEllen Visibility Awards	Favorite Web Series	Won
2015	Shorty Awards	Favorite Webshow	Nominated
2015	Streamy Awards	Best Drama	Nominated
2015	AfterEllen Visibility Awards	Favorite Lesbian/Bi TV Character	Won
2015	AfterEllen Visibility Awards	Favorite Fictional Lesbian Couple	Won
2015	AfterEllen Visibility Awards	Best Web Series	Won
2015	Digi Awards	Branded Content	Won
2016	Canadian Screen Awards	Digital Media Program/Series - Fiction	Won
2016	Banff Rockies Awards	Branded Content Award	Won
2018	MIPTV Media Market	Branded Content of the Year	Won

== Novelization ==
On May 7, 2019 a novelisation of the web series was released. The book Carmilla is written by Kim Turrisi.

== See also ==
- List of vampire television series
