= Queen Camilla (disambiguation) =

Queen Camilla (born 1947) is the consort of Charles III.

Queen Camilla may also refer to:

- Queen Camilla (novel), a 2006 novel by Sue Townsend
- Camilla (mythology), a character in Virgil's Aeneid

== See also ==
- Camilla (disambiguation)
