= Natasha Negovanlis =

Canadian actress and writer

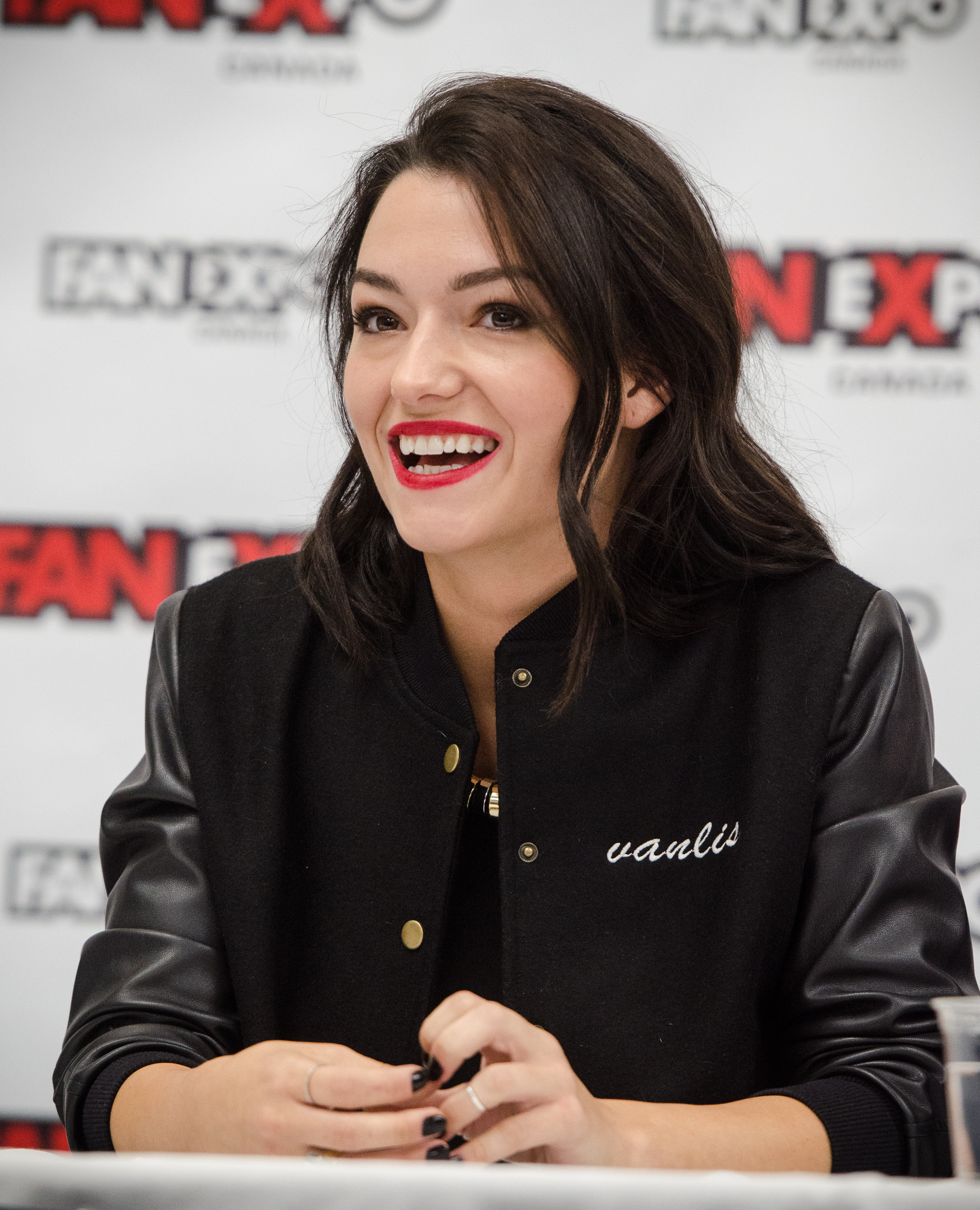
- Negovanlis in 2017
- Born: Toronto, Ontario, Canada
- Education: McGill University
- Occupations: Actress, writer, singer
- Years active: 2011–present
- Known for: Carmilla
- Website: Official website of Natasha Negovanlis

Natasha Negovanlis is a Canadian actress, writer, producer, and singer. She achieved international recognition for portraying Carmilla Karnstein in the YouTube web series Carmilla (2014–2016) and in the 2017 feature film based on the series.

== Career ==
Before acting professionally, Negovanlis studied musical theatre and film at the Wexford Collegiate School for the Arts in Toronto and Voice Performance at The Schulich School of Music at McGill University.

In 2014, Negovanlis was cast as the title role in the Canadian Screen Award winning web series Carmilla. In the series, which is based on the 1871-1872 gothic novella of the same name, Negovanlis portrays the vampire Carmilla Karnstein, who appears after her roommate's previous roommate vanishes. The series premiered on Vervegirl (rebranded as KindaTV as of February 2016) channel on August 19, 2014, and has achieved worldwide recognition and praise for its near all-female cast and positive representation of various LGBT characters.

In 2015, she also starred with her Carmilla co-star Elise Bauman in the feature film Almost Adults, which screened at several film festivals in 2016 before premiering on Netflix. Also that year, she appeared as herself in an episode of the Canadian anthology horror television series Slasher, and ranked 5th on AfterEllen's annual Hot 100 List.

At the 5th Canadian Screen Awards, Negovanlis won the Fan's Choice Award, reportedly receiving over two million votes, for her work on Carmilla. Her acceptance speech, in which she discussed the importance of queer representation, attracted media attention from various publications, including BuzzFeed and the Toronto Star.

In 2017, Negovanlis guest-starred in an episode of Murdoch Mysteries and reprised her role of Carmilla Karnstein in The Carmilla Movie, a spin-off feature film based on the series.

Later that year, alongside her Carmilla co-star Annie M. Briggs, Negovanlis successfully funded a digital series called CLAIREvoyant through an Independent Production Fund grant as well as an Indiegogo campaign that raised over US$25,000. The comedy was co-created, co-written, and co-produced by Negovanlis and Briggs, and it premiered on the KindaTV YouTube channel on May 16, 2018, and won an award at the New York Web Fest later that year.

In 2017, Negovanlis co-starred in her first American feature film, Freelancers Anonymous, which premiered at the historic Castro Theatre in San Francisco on June 15, 2018.

== Personal life ==
Negovanlis is of Macedonian and Greek descent on her father's side, while her mother is of mixed Irish, French, and Indigenous ancestry.

She has had relationships with both men and women and has publicly identified as queer, pansexual, or bisexual.

Negovanlis has an adopted rescue dog named Charlie.

== Filmography ==
Year	Title	Role	Notes
2014	The Way We Are	Sophie	Short film; lead role
2014	Carmilla	Mircalla "Carmilla" Karnstein	Web series; title role
2014	Canadian Star	Herself	Documentary
2015	March Family Letters	Sallie	Web series; 2 episodes
2015	Slasher	Natasha	1 episode
2016	Almost Adults	Cassie	Feature film; lead role
2016	Haunted or Hoax	Ellia Henderson	Web series; 27 episodes
2017	The Carmilla Movie	Mircalla "Carmilla" Karnstein	Feature film based on the series; title role
2017	Murdoch Mysteries	Mildred Preston	1 episode
2017	Seraphim	Sarah	2 episodes
2017	Darken	Victoria	Feature film; supporting role
2017	Haunters: The Musical	Penny	Web series; supporting role
2017	Barbelle	Ghost of girlfriends' past	Web series; 1 episode
2018	Freelancers Anonymous	Gayle	Lead role; feature film
2018	CLAIREvoyant	Claire Ganski	Web series; lead role; co-creator, writer, producer
2020	Band Ladies	Lauren	Web series

== Accolades ==
Year	Association	Category	Nominated work	Result
2012	Broadway World Awards	Best Performance by a Female in a Feature Role/Ensemble (Musical)	Off-Broadway on stage	Nominated
2015	Shorty Awards	Favorite Actress	Carmilla	Nominated
2015	Streamy Awards	Best Actress	Carmilla	Nominated
2016	Canadian Screen Awards	Fan's Choice, Top 3	Carmilla	Nominated
2016	NYC Web Fest	Best Ensemble Cast, along with Isabel Kanaan and Sydney Kondruss	Haunted or Hoax	Nominated
2017	Canadian Screen Awards	Fan's Choice	Carmilla	Won
2017	Streamy Awards	Best Acting in a Drama	Carmilla	Nominated
2017	Los Angeles Web Series Festival	Best Ensemble Cast, along with Isabel Kanaan and Sydney Kondruss	Haunted or Hoax	Nominated
2018	British LGBT Awards	Online Influencer	Self	Nominated
2018	Diva Awards	Social Media Influencer	Self	Nominated
2018	Toronto Web Fest Awards	Best Ensemble Performance	Haunters: The Musical	Won
2018	NYC Web Fest	Best Dynamic Duo, along with Annie M. Briggs	CLAIREvoyant	Won
