= Jordan Hall (writer) =

Canadian writer, playwright, web series creator

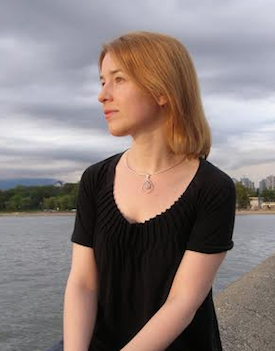
- Hall in 2012
- Born: Hamilton, Ontario, Canada
- Citizenship: Canadian
- Education: University of British Columbia
- Occupations: Playwright, writer, web series creator
- Writing career
- Notable work: Carmilla

Jordan Hall is a Canadian writer, playwright and web series creator, best known for creating the award-winning web series Carmilla.

== Early life ==
Hall was born in Hamilton, Ontario, Canada and attended McMaster University. After moving to the west coast, she joined the rank and file of the University of British Columbia in the Creative Writing MFA program.

== Career ==
=== Carmilla ===
In 2013, Jordan co-created the CSA-winning web series Carmilla for SmokeBomb Entertainment.

The series premiered on the Vervegirl (rebranded as 'KindaTV' as of January 2016) YouTube channel on August 19, 2014. U by Kotex is the executive producer of the web series. The series takes place at the fictional Silas University in Styria, Austria and is told through video journals (Vlogs) recorded by Laura, a first-year student. The first and second seasons each consist of 36 three to seven-minute episodes. A twelve-episode prequel mini-season, "season zero," was announced just after the release of the final episode of season 2.

On February 13, 2016, it was announced that Carmilla will air its third and final season in the summer of 2016. In 2016, the series won a Rockie Award for Branded Content at the Banff World Media Festival.

== Accolades ==
In 2011, Hall won the Crazy8s Short Film Production Competition.
