= Annie M. Briggs =

Canadian actress

Annie Briggs
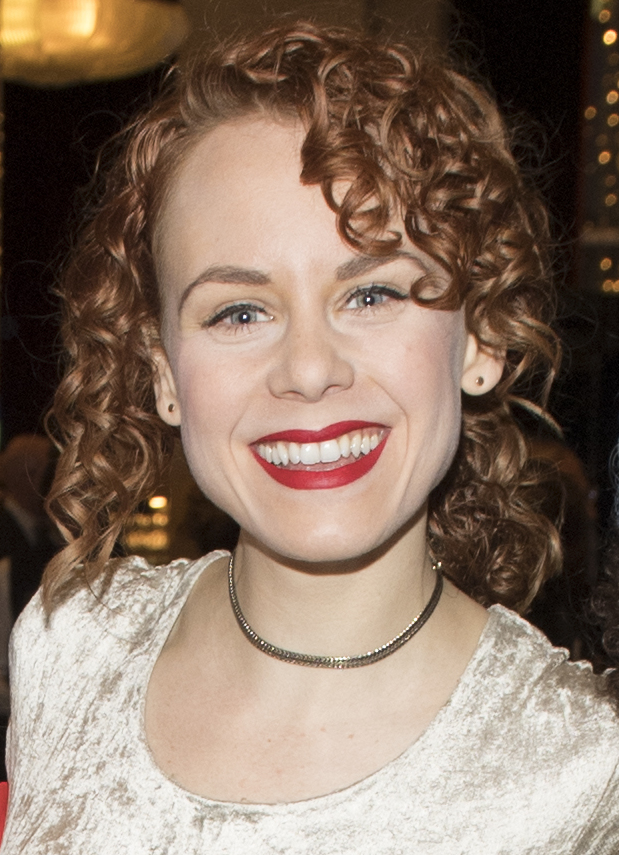
- Briggs in 2019
- Born: Annie Morgan Briggs; May 2, 1987 (age 38); Halifax, Nova Scotia, Canada
- Other names: Annie Briggs
- Occupation: Actress
- Years active: 2008–present

Annie Morgan Briggs is a Canadian actress. She is best known for her portrayal of Lola Perry in the web series Carmilla (2014–2016).

== Early life ==
Briggs grew up in Halifax, Nova Scotia and received her B.A.H. in Theatre from Queen's University. After graduating, she studied at the American Academy of Dramatic Arts in New York City. She later moved to Toronto, Ontario.

== Career ==
Briggs has appeared on stage in the Reach Ensemble Theatre and Single Thread Theatre. In 2014, she became famous for playing the character of Perry in the LGBT web series Carmilla. In 2015, Briggs was placed 73rd on AfterEllen's Hot 100 List. In 2016 she played the main antagonist—the Dean—in Carmilla as her character Perry was possessed by the Dean.

In 2017, along with her Carmilla co-star Natasha Negovanlis, Briggs launched her own web series called CLAIREvoyant; the series was successfully funded through the Independent Production Fund and an Indiegogo campaign that raised more than US$25,000.

== Filmography ==
Year	Title	Role	Notes
2014	Roundabout	Leda Calder	Main role
2014	Murdoch Mysteries	Eileen	TV series, 1 episode
2014–2016	Carmilla	Lola Perry	KindaTV Digital Series, Main role
2015	Canadian Star	Herself	Documentary
2016	Luvvie	Abby	Short film
2016	45	Jogger	Short film
2017	The Carmilla Movie	Lola Perry	Main role
2018	Fox, Kitten, Sparrow	Gala	
2018	Darken : Before the Dark	Kim	KindaTV Digital Series
2018	CLAIREVOYANT	Ruby	KindaTV Digital Series, Main Role, Co-Creator
2019	A Very Important Appointment	Audrey	Short film
2019	Murdoch Mysteries	Lucille Anderson	TV series, 1 episode
2019	Ruth	Ruth	Short film
2020	Wharf Rats		Web series, 6 episodes
2020	Transplant	Nicole Spencer	TV series, 1 episode
2020	Stardust	Jeanie Richardson	
2021–2023	Chucky	Rachel Fairchild	TV series, recurring

== Theatre ==
Year	Title	Role	Theatre	Location
2008	The Odyssey	Eurycleia	Modern Fuel Artist-Run Center	Kingston, Canada.
2009	The Seagull	Irina Arkadina	Drama Department	Kingston, Canada
2012	The Brightness of Heaven	Kathleen	Manhattan Repertory Theatre	New York, United States
2014	Much Ado About Nothing	Conrad	Spadina Museum, Single Thread Theatre Company	Toronto, Ontario
2014	Romeo and Juliet	Lady Capulet	Classical Theatre Project	Toronto, Ontario
2014	Hamlet	Gertrude	Winter Garden Theatre, Classical Theatre Project	Toronto, Ontario
2014	Macbeth	Witch / Fleance / Gentlewoman / Young Siward	Winter Garden Theatre	Toronto, Ontario
2014	The Memo	Alice	Unit 102 Theatre	Toronto, Ontario
2016	Schoolhouse	Mrs. Coyte, Mrs. Baptie	Festival Players of Prince Edward County	Wellington, Canada
