= HMS Camilla =

Two ships of the Royal Navy have borne the name HMS Camilla:

- HMS Camilla (1776) was a 20-gun sixth rate launched in 1776, used for harbour service from 1814 and sold in 1831.
- HMS Camilla (1847) was a 16-gun sloop launched in 1847 and lost in a typhoon in 1860.
