= Almost Adults =

2016 Canadian film directed by Sarah Rotella

- Directed by: Sarah Rotella
- Written by: Adrianna DiLonardo
- Produced by: Rebecca Swift
- Starring: Natasha Negovanlis; Elise Bauman; Justin Gerhard; Winny Clarke
- Cinematography: Ryan Glover
- Edited by: Haya Waseem
- Production company: Unsolicited Pictures
- Distributed by: Gravitas Ventures
- Release dates: May 28, 2016 (Toronto LGBT Film Festival); February 7, 2017
- Running time: 90 minutes
- Country: Canada
- Language: English

Almost Adults is a 2016 Canadian comedy film directed by Sarah Rotella starring Elise Bauman and Natasha Negovanlis. The film is a platonic love story about two lifelong best friends struggling to keep their friendship together as their lives head in different directions. It was written by Adrianna DiLonardo.

== Premise ==
The film follows two best friends in their final year of college while they transition into adulthood. One embraces her sexuality and tries to catch up on everything she has missed during her teenage years, while the other ends a long-term relationship with her boyfriend and discovers her life isn't going as planned. Both struggle to keep their friendship together as they begin growing apart.

== Cast ==
- Natasha Negovanlis as Cassie
- Elise Bauman as Mackenzie
- Justin Gerhard as Levi
- Winny Clarke as Elliot
- Mark Matechuk as Matthew
- Pujaa Pandey as Tasha
- Delphine Roussel as Diane
- Meredith Heinrich as Lisa
- Christina Song as Juliana
- Daryl Marks as John
- David J Phillips as Dr. Reese

== Production ==
The film was shot in Toronto, Ontario in 2015, over the course of 11 days.

== Release ==
Almost Adults was fully funded through Kickstarter in 2015, reaching 305% of its goal in 30 days. The film won IndieWire's Project Of The Year in 2015, and was a part of the Tribeca Film Institute Network. Almost Adults premiered at the Inside Out Film Festival where it won honourable mention in the Best Feature Film category and went on to screen at 12 more festivals worldwide. Almost Adults had its U.S. premiere at Outfest. The film was acquired by Gravitas Ventures and released on video on demand in 2017.

== Reception ==
BuzzFeed included Almost Adults in their list "25 Films That Have Made A Difference To The LGBT Community". Autostraddle praised the film for flipping the script on classic lesbian movie tropes, commenting that the story wasn't about either of the characters having feelings for the other, or Mack coming out and Cassie not accepting her, but rather that they were both "young and selfish and trying to figure out who they were and how they fit into each other's lives." Curve said the "film takes a light hearted and comedic approach at portraying the struggles all young adults face."

The Hollywood Reporter gave a positive review, stating that "... above all else, it excels at remaining inoffensive, which isn't always the best approach for an adult comedy dealing with high-stakes personal issues." The review went on to praise Negovanlis and Bauman's chemistry, but stated "the comedic quotient drops noticeably in scenes with mostly underwhelming supporting cast members." The review criticized how predictable the film was, but gave praise to Rotella for "[having] an eye for visual humor and comedic timing."

DorkShelf.com Casey Reid wrote a positive review in regards to the movie both by praising the movie itself and the director, "Almost Adults is a cohesive debut film that shows our digital age's love and relationships in a fresh way, signalling a promising career for Sarah Rotella." She continues, "what makes Almost Adults refreshing is that it's reflexive of contemporary queer culture, albeit white centric, in a way that signals a shift in queer cinema. While it does not quite touch on ideas of nostalgia so entrenched in queer cinema, it seems to directly reflect how young people connect and disconnect with themselves and each other." However she does mention how the films "lacks depth in certain areas."

== See also ==
- List of LGBT films directed by women
- Female gaze
