= The Carmilla Movie =

2017 film by Spencer Maybee

- Theatrical release poster
- Directed by: Spencer Maybee
- Screenplay by: Alejandro Alcoba; Jordan Hall
- Story by: Alejandro Alcoba
- Based on: Carmilla by Joseph Sheridan Le Fanu
- Produced by: Steph Ouaknine; Melanie Windle
- Starring: Elise Bauman; Natasha Negovanlis
- Cinematography: James Poremba
- Edited by: Jordan Crute
- Music by: Armen Bazarian
- Production companies: Eggplant Picture & Sound; Shaftesbury Films
- Release date: October 26, 2017 (Canada)
- Running time: 97 minutes
- Country: Canada
- Language: English

The Carmilla Movie is a 2017 Canadian vampire comedy film directed by Spencer Maybee, based on the web series of the same name (2014–2016). Both the film and the web series were adapted from the 1872 gothic novella Carmilla by Joseph Sheridan Le Fanu. The film received a limited theatrical release in Canada on October 26, 2017.

== Plot ==
Picking up five years after the series ends, Carmilla and Laura are now living in Toronto. Laura has been trying to start her career as a journalist, and Carmilla is enjoying the benefits of being human again. Laura has been having nightmares, revealed to be visions of Carmilla's past, and Carmilla's vampirism starts acting up. When Perry and LaFontaine look over Carmilla, it turns out Carmilla's humanity (dubbed "The Spark") is fading. Figuring there is a connection between this and Laura's dreams, Carmilla, Laura and their friends, Kirsch, Perry, LaFontaine, and Mel, make a trip to a mansion in Austria.

At the mansion, they are greeted by ghosts from Carmilla's past; the girls who were sacrificed in her mother's rituals and are unable to cross over into the afterlife. While they have no resentment for Carmilla's roles in their deaths, they explain that there is a ritual that can help them pass over; The Ash Moon Ritual; if Carmilla willingly sacrifices her mortality and human life, by channeling it into a gem and destroying said gem. After they celebrate at a masquerade party the ghosts are hosting, Carmilla channels her humanity into the gem, but it is stolen before it can be destroyed. The thief is revealed to be Carmilla's friend and love interest from centuries prior, Elle Sheridan, who previously betrayed Carmilla to her mother before her death.

Elle reveals she is the one behind Laura's nightmares, and that she has taken a sociopathic streak as a spirit; resenting the life Carmilla and Laura had together, and planning on stealing Carmilla's life for the purposes of restoring her own; all the while not caring that she's casting the other ghosts into the nightmare realm that once imprisoned them. Elle casts all but one of the ghosts into this dimension, along with LaFontaine, but is unable to leave the mansion. Elle stalks and picks off Laura and Carmilla's friends, sending them into the dimension as well, and tries to torment them into surrendering the last remaining ghost, Charlotte. Using Charlotte as a trap, a fight ensues with Ell, that sends them into the nightmare realm as well.

Laura discovers the nightmare realm to be a dimension forcing its captives to experience their worst memories constantly as a personal Hell. Still being pursued by Elle, Laura discovers Carmilla's worse memory to be of Elle's betrayal. After rescuing the other ghosts and their friends, Carmilla and Laura gather them to complete the Ash Moon ritual. Elle interrupts them yet again, holding a knife to Carmilla's throat and demanding the gem. Laura tries to appeal to Elle, to no avail, before Mel shoots Elle, subduing her and allowing the ritual to pass, freeing the ghosts to move on to the afterlife.

Returning home, Carmilla and Laura talk about how their relationship will progress with Carmilla being a vampire yet again. Laura states she doesn't see it as a problem and the two affirm their love for each other. Over the credits, Laura's career and further ventures with Carmilla, including their discovery of the Fountain of Youth, indicating that Laura will continue to live alongside Carmilla, as well as the two holding a baby. In an after credits scene, Carmilla is approached by the spirit of her sister Mattie, who warns her that the anglerfish entity from Silas was female and has laid eggs. Carmilla is immediately ready for the next adventure.

== Cast ==
- Elise Bauman as Laura Eileen Hollis
- Natasha Negovanlis as Mircalla "Carmilla" Karnstein
- Dominique Provost-Chalkley as Elle Sheridan
- Annie Briggs as Lola Perry
- K Alexander as S. Lafontaine
- Nicole Stamp as Melanippe "Mel" Callis
- Grace Lynn Kung as Charlotte Bronte
- Cara Gee as Emily Bronte
- Matt O'Connor as Wilson Kirsch
- Sophia Walker as Matska "Mattie" Belmonde
- Sharon Belle as Danielle "Danny" Lawrence

== Production ==
The film is based on the Canadian web series Carmilla. Both the film and the web series were adapted from the 1872 gothic novella Carmilla by Joseph Sheridan Le Fanu. In September 2017 a trailer of the film was shown at the 2017 New York Comic Con. Aside from the characters that had already appeared in the series, the film introduced one new character: Carmilla's first love Ell, who was played by Dominique Provost-Chalkley. While the web series was presented in five-minute segments viewed through the webcam of the main character, Laura Hollis, the film also shows the characters when Laura's camera is offline. The film was shot in 14 days in June 2017. The film stars the cast of the web series: Elise Bauman, Natasha Negovanlis, Annie Briggs, K Alexander, Nicole Stamp, and Matt O'Connor. Newly introduced cast members include Dominique Provost-Chalkley, Grace Lynn Kung, and Cara Gee.

Filming took place throughout the month of June 2017 in and around Toronto. 30% of financing for the film, which was made for less than $1 million, came from preselling the film via VHX to fans. Alejandro Alcoba and Jordan Hall wrote the script for the film.

== Release ==
The Carmilla Movie was released in Cineplex theatres across Canada for one night only on October 26, 2017, and was released via streaming on Fullscreen the following day.

The film had its television premiere on Hollywood Suite on January 3, 2018, along with the complete web series in an 18-hour marathon.

== Reception ==
Amy Zimmerman of The Daily Beast praises that the film does not focus on "pale men and their fawning female victims", but rather sapphic women who are not "portrayed through harmful stereotypes". According to Amy, "Carmilla's creative team actively avoids the tropes that have come to define queer women in pop culture". Jessica Oshanani of Her Campus thinks that the film is "incredible and worth watching". She believes that the cast, who bring their own unique personalities into the film, are one of the best things about the film.

Peter Knegt from CBC.ca felt that the film was made mainly for fans of the web series. Because he had not seen the web series first, he found it hard to follow the plot in the film. He also mentions that the film is "not just a lesbian vampire movie, but a whole world dominated by characters who are queer and/or female", and that it even has a non-binary character in LaFontaine. Karly Ko from Autostraddle says that The Carmilla Movie was even better than she expected as a fan of the web series. She praises the cast and the depiction of the characters' relationships. Aja Romano from Vox believes that The Carmilla Movie is mainly interesting to those who are happy to spend a few hours watching two beautiful women who are happy with each other in a simple and sweet love story.
