= Ameletos =

Town in ancient Pontus

Coordinates: 41°06′21″N 37°23′11″E

Ameletos or Camila was a town of ancient Pontus, not far from the coast, a little to the west of Polemonium.

Its site is located in Asiatic Turkey.
