= Carmilla =

1872 novella by Sheridan Le Fanu

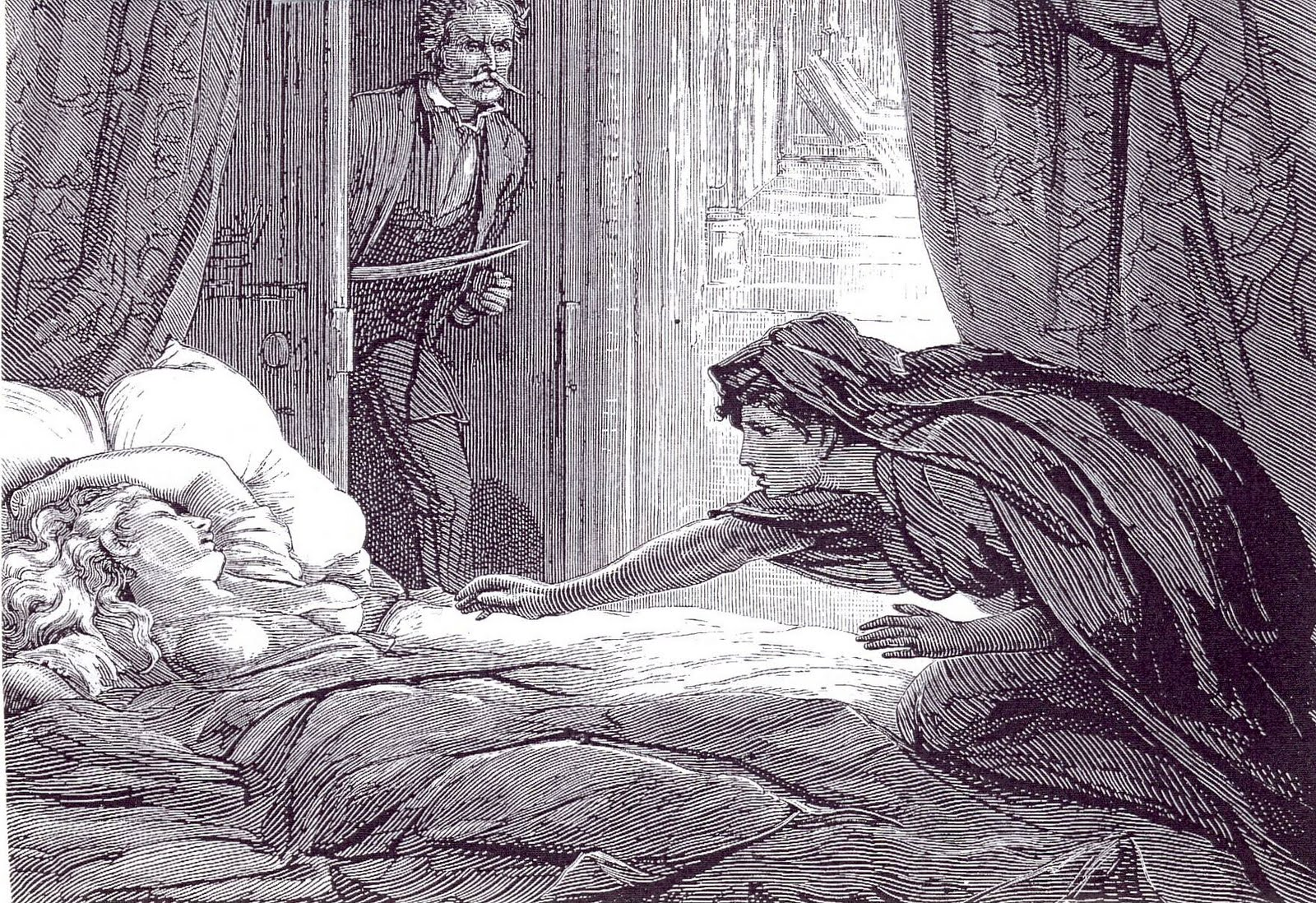
- Illustration from The Dark Blue by D. H. Friston (1872)
- Author: Joseph Sheridan Le Fanu
- Illustrator: D. H. Friston
- Language: English
- Series: The Dark Blue
- Genre: Gothic, horror, vampire literature
- Set in: Styria, 19th century
- Publisher: British & Colonial Publishing
- Publication date: 1871–1872
- Publication place: England
- Pages: 108
- Dewey Decimal: 823.8
- LC Class: PR4879 .L7
- Text: Carmilla at Wikisource

Carmilla is an 1872 Gothic novella by Irish author Joseph Sheridan Le Fanu. A foundational work of English-language vampire literature, it predated Bram Stoker's Dracula (1897) by 25 years. First published as a serial in The Dark Blue from 1871–72, the novella subsequently appeared in Le Fanu’s short story collection In a Glass Darkly in 1872. Set in 19th-century Styria, it is the story of a young woman who is pursued by the vampire Carmilla. Since its initial publication, Carmilla has often been regarded as one of the most influential vampire stories of all time; its title character is the literary prototype for the female and lesbian vampires in fiction.

The work is narrated by Laura, a young woman living in a secluded Austrian castle, who becomes the object of both affection and predation by the enigmatic Carmilla, leading to a complex and dangerous relationship marked by both romantic desires and vampiric violence. The narrative explores themes of sexual identity, the supernatural, and the tension between innocence and corruption, while maintaining a sense of dread and suspense.

Carmilla defined the vampire fiction genre and Gothic horror in general, and established Le Fanu as a major writer in the genre. The novella directly influenced later horror and mystery writers such as Bram Stoker, M. R. James, Henry James, and others. Due to its popularity, the work has been anthologised, having been adapted extensively for films, operas, video games, Halloween plays, comics, cartoons, radio, and other media since the late 19th century.

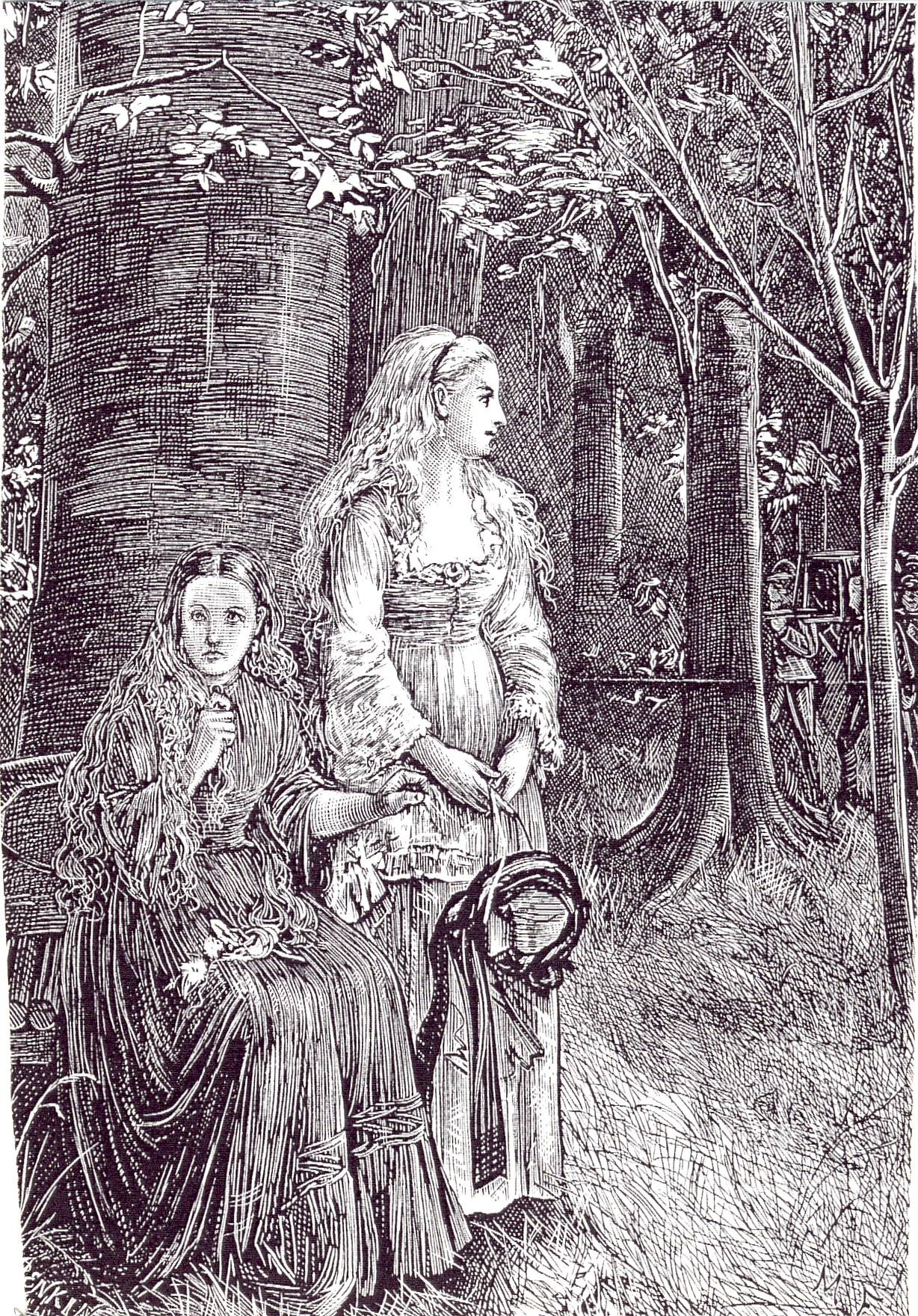
Illustration by Michael Fitzgerald for Le Fanu's story Carmilla in "The Dark Blue" (January 1872), electrotype after wood-engraving, reproduced in Best Ghost Stories, ed. Bleiler.

== Publication ==
Carmilla first appeared as a serial in the literary magazine The Dark Blue in late 1871 and early 1872. Within the same year of the serial's conclusion, the novella was reprinted in Le Fanu's short-story collection In a Glass Darkly (1872) with alterations, the most significant of which being an additional preface re-framing the story as a case file of Le Fanu's fictional occult detective, Doctor Martin Hesselius. Comparing the work of two illustrators of the story, David Henry Friston and Michael Fitzgerald (whose work appears in the original magazine article but not in modern printings of the book) reveals inconsistencies in the characters' depictions. Consequently, confusion has arisen relating the illustrations to the plot.

Carmilla has frequently been republished both in collections and as a standalone work. Due to the intimate relationship described between Laura and Carmilla, the novella has often been shared via private queer publications. It has also been translated into Spanish. Isabella Mazzanti illustrated the book's 2014 edition, which was published by Editions Soleil and translated by Gaid Girard.

The 2019 edition of Carmilla was edited and introduced by Carmen Maria Machado. Her introduction, a pastiche mirroring Le Fanu's 1872 "Hesselius" prologue, adds an additional (fictional) framing story to the narrative by introducing the scholarship of a non-existent professor called Dr. Jane Leight. "Leight," according to Machado, claims that the story in Carmilla copied and censored the story of a real romance between two women. Machado claims the story is based on under-studied letters from Veronika Hausle to Pierre Fontenot, purportedly detailing a romance between Hausle and Marcia Marén. (Note: This latter name is a pun poking fun at Carmilla's habit of choosing anagrams of her own name for pseudonyms; "Marcia Marén" is an anagram for "Carmen Maria.") The edition includes footnotes and limited textual changes by Machado, as well as illustrations by Robert Kraiza. These changes both modernize some of Le Fanu's dialogue and humanize Carmilla, aligning with an artistic tradition that reclaims queer villains. Major themes of the work include questioning authority, reading for truth in stories altered by heterosexism, and uncovering silenced voices.

== Plot summary ==
The story is presented as part of the casebook of Dr. Hesselius, (Note: Hesselius's departures from medical orthodoxy rank him as the first occult detective in literature.) which is being assembled by an unnamed assistant "for the laity."

A woman named Laura narrates, beginning with her childhood in a "picturesque and solitary" castle amid an extensive forest in Styria, where she lives with her father, a wealthy English widower retired from service to the Austrian Empire. Due to the remoteness of their "schloss," and because she is an only child, Laura has only her father, her governesses, and servants for company. She recounts that, when she was six, she had a vision of a beautiful visitor in her bedchamber. She recalls being punctured in her breast, although no wound was found. All the household assure Laura that it was just a dream, and there is no subsequent vision or visitation, but Laura insists that it was real.

Twelve years later, Laura's father tells her of a letter from his friend, General Spielsdorf. The General was supposed to visit them with his niece, Bertha Rheinfeldt, but she died under mysterious circumstances. The General promises to discuss the circumstances in detail when they meet later.

Laura, saddened by the loss of a potential friend, longs for a companion. A carriage accident outside Laura's home unexpectedly brings Carmilla, a girl of Laura's age, into the family's care. Though Carmilla appears injured after her carriage accident, her mysterious mother informs Laura's father that her journey is urgent and cannot be delayed. On Laura's urging, her father proposes that the woman leave Carmilla in his care until she can return for her in three months. The woman agrees, but warns that the "nervous, but quite sane" Carmilla will not disclose any information whatsoever about her family, her past, or herself. Both girls instantly recognise each other from the "dream" they both had when they were young.

Carmilla and Laura grow to be close, but Carmilla's odd behaviors unsettle Laura. On the one hand, she refuses to tell Laura anything about herself, despite Laura's burning curiosity. On the other, she sometimes makes romantic advances towards Laura which cause conflicted feelings of attraction and revulsion. In addition to this, she never joins the household in its prayers, she sleeps much of the day, she never eats, and she seems to sleepwalk outside at night.

When a shipment of restored heirloom paintings arrives, Laura finds a portrait of her ancestor Mircalla Karnstein, Countess Karnstein, dated 1698. The portrait resembles Carmilla exactly, down to the mole on her neck. Carmilla suggests that she, too, is descended from the Karnsteins, though the family died out centuries before.

During Carmilla's stay, Laura has nightmares of a large, cat-like beast entering her room. The beast springs onto the bed and Laura feels something like two needles, an inch or two apart, darting deep into her breast. The beast then takes the form of a female figure and disappears through the door without opening it. In another nightmare, Laura hears a voice say, "Your mother warns you to beware of the assassin," and a light reveals Carmilla standing at the foot of her bed, her nightdress drenched in blood. After a frantic search of the castle and the grounds, Laura discovers Carmilla in her bedroom as if nothing has happened. Laura's father suggests that she was sleepwalking; Carmilla admits that she sleepwalked as a child.

Laura's health declines, and her father has a doctor examine her. He finds a small, blue spot, an inch or two below her collar, where the creature in her dream bit her, and speaks privately with her father, only asking that Laura never be unattended. Laura asks what is wrong with her, but her father reassures her that she needn't worry.

The group plans a day trip to the ruined village of Karnstein, three miles distant. Laura and her father depart first, leaving a message behind asking Carmilla and a governess to follow once the perpetually late-sleeping Carmilla awakes. En route to Karnstein, Laura and her father encounter Spielsdorf, who tells them his story.

At a costume ball, Spielsdorf and Bertha had met a beautiful young woman named "Millarca" and her enigmatic mother. The mother convinced Spielsdorf that she was an old friend of his and asked that Millarca be allowed to stay with them for three weeks while she attended to a secret matter of great importance. Bertha was immediately taken with Millarca.

Bertha fell mysteriously ill, suffering the same symptoms as Laura. After consulting with a specially ordered priestly doctor, Spielsdorf realised that Bertha was being visited by a vampire. He hid with a sword and waited until a large, black creature crawled onto Bertha's bed and spread itself onto her throat. He leapt from his hiding place and attacked the creature, which had then taken the form of Millarca. She fled through the locked door, unharmed. Bertha died before the morning dawned.

Upon arriving at Karnstein, Spielsdorf asks a woodsman where he can find the tomb of Mircalla Karnstein. The woodman says the tomb was relocated long ago by a Moravian nobleman who vanquished the vampires haunting the region.

While Spielsdorf and Laura are alone in the ruined chapel, Carmilla appears. Spielsdorf attacks her with an axe. Carmilla disarms Spielsdorf and disappears. Spielsdorf explains that Carmilla is also Millarca, both anagrams for the original name of the vampire Mircalla, Countess Karnstein.

The party is joined by Baron Vordenburg, the descendant of the hero who rid the area of vampires. Vordenburg, an authority on vampires, has discovered that his ancestor was romantically involved with Mircalla before she died. Using his forefather's notes, he locates Mircalla's hidden tomb. An imperial commission exhumes the body of Mircalla. Immersed in blood, it seems to be breathing faintly, its heart beating, its eyes open. A stake is driven through its heart, and it gives a corresponding shriek; then, the head is struck off. The body and head are burned to ashes, which are thrown into a river.

Afterwards, Laura's father takes his daughter on a year-long tour through Italy to regain her health and recover from the trauma, but she never fully does.

== Motifs ==
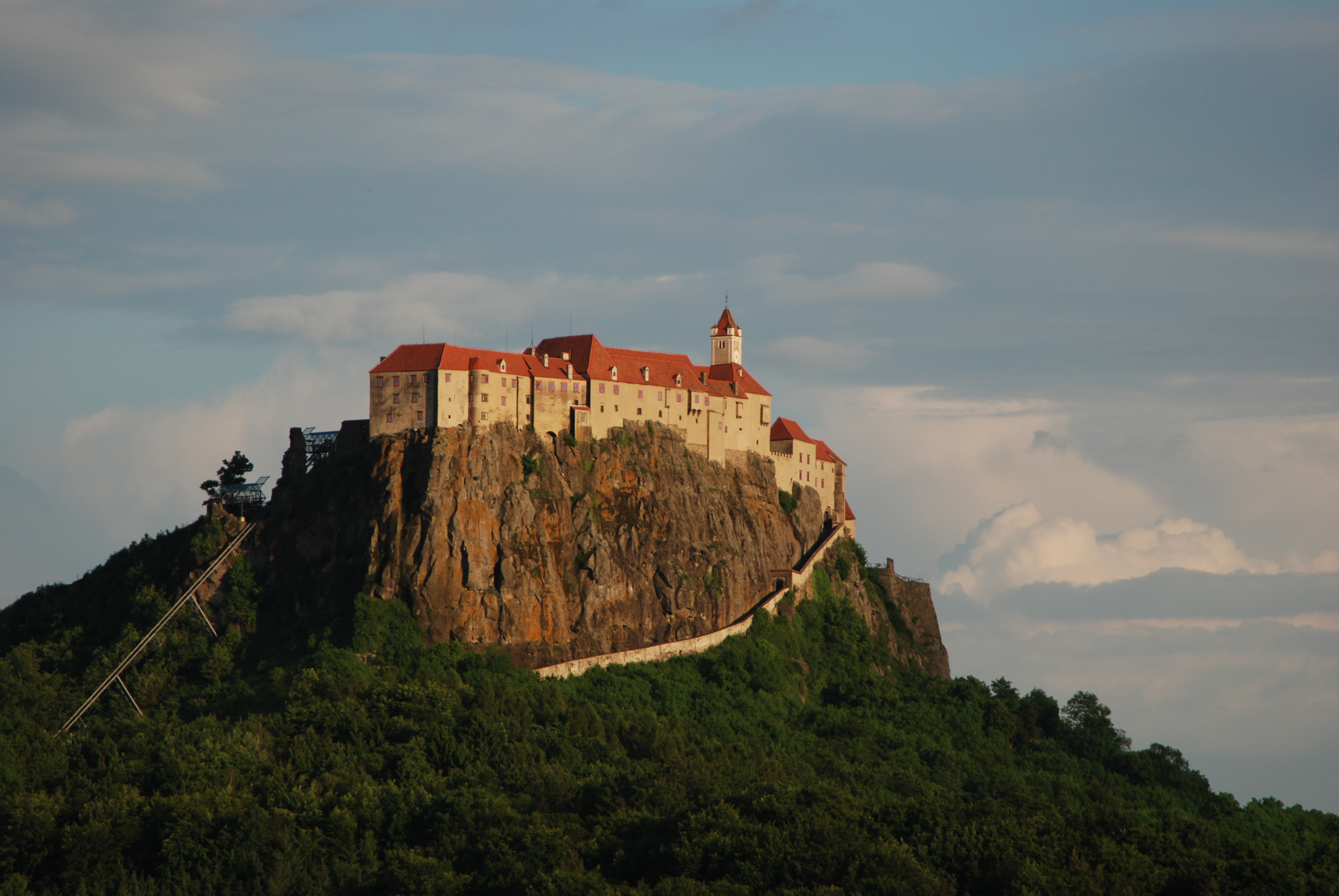
Riegersburg Castle, Styria, suggested as a possible inspiration for Laura's Schloss.

Carmilla exhibits the primary characteristics of Gothic fiction. It includes a supernatural figure, a dark setting of an old castle, a mysterious atmosphere, and ominous or superstitious elements.

In the novella, Le Fanu opposes the Victorian view of women as merely useful possessions of men, relying on men and needing their constant guardianship. The male characters of the story, such as Laura's father and General Spielsdorf, are exposed as being the opposite of the putative Victorian males—helpless and unproductive. The nameless father reaches an agreement with Carmilla's mother, whereas Spielsdorf cannot control the fate of his niece, Bertha. Both of these scenes portray women as equal, if not superior to men. This female empowerment is even more clear if we consider Carmilla's vampiric predecessors and their relationship with their prey. Carmilla is the opposite of those male vampires—she is actually involved with her victims both emotionally and (theoretically) sexually. Moreover, she is able to exceed even more limitations by dominating death. In the end, her immortality is suggested to be sustained by the river where her ashes had been scattered.

Le Fanu also departs from the negative idea of female parasitism and lesbianism by depicting a mutual and irresistible connection between Carmilla and Laura. The latter, along with other female characters, becomes a symbol of all Victorian women—restrained and judged for their emotional reflexes. The ambiguity of Laura's speech and behaviour reveals her struggles with being fully expressive of her concerns and desires.

Another important element of "Carmilla" is the concept of dualism presented through the juxtaposition of vampire and human, as well as lesbian and heterosexual. It is also vivid in Laura's irresolution, since she "feels both attraction and repulsion" towards Carmilla. The duality of Carmilla's character is suggested by her human attributes, the lack of predatory demeanour, and her shared experience with Laura. According to Gabriella Jönsson, Carmilla can be seen as a representation of the dark side of all mankind.

== Sources ==
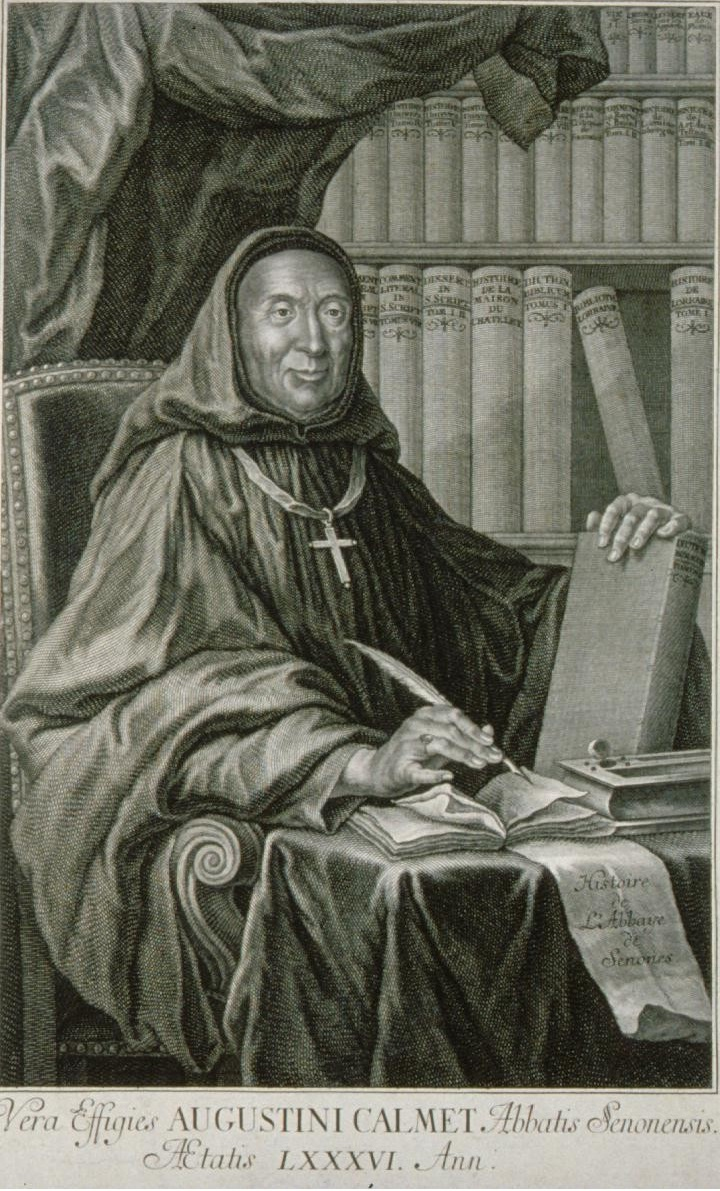
Dom Calmet

As with Dracula, critics have looked for the sources used in the writing of Carmilla. One source used was from a dissertation on magic, vampires, and the apparitions of spirits written by Dom Augustin Calmet entitled Traité sur les apparitions des esprits et sur les vampires ou les revenants de Hongrie, de Moravie, &c. (1751). This is evidenced by a report analysed by Calmet, from a priest who learned information of a town being tormented by a vampiric entity three years earlier. Having travelled to the town to investigate and collecting information of the various inhabitants there, the priest learned that a vampire had tormented many of the inhabitants at night by coming from the nearby cemetery and would haunt many of the residents on their beds. An unknown Hungarian traveller came to the town during this period and helped the town by setting a trap at the cemetery and decapitating the vampire that resided there, curing the town of their torment. This story was retold by Le Fanu and adapted into the thirteenth chapter of Carmilla.

According to Matthew Gibson, the Reverend Sabine Baring-Gould's The Book of Were-wolves (1863) and his account of Elizabeth Báthory, Coleridge's Christabel (Part 1, 1797 and Part 2, 1800), and Captain Basil Hall's Schloss Hainfeld; or a Winter in Lower Styria (London and Edinburgh, 1836) are other sources for Le Fanu's Carmilla. Hall's account provides much of the Styrian background and, in particular, a model for both Carmilla and Laura in the figure of Jane Anne Cranstoun, Countess Purgstall.

== Influence ==
Carmilla, the title character, is the literary prototype for the female and sapphic vampires in fiction. The accepted norms around platonic physical intimacy between women in the Victorian period make the nature of both Carmilla's and Laura's sexuality more ambiguous than modern readers may assume, and scholars have observed that it is entirely possible to read theirs as a story of platonic friendship, same-sex romantic attraction, or even maternal-filial care. However, many literary scholars and critics assert that lesbian attraction is the most prominent dynamic represented in the story.

One particular passage that is given as an example of the romantic reading of Carmilla comes from chapter 4:

Sometimes after an hour of apathy, my strange and beautiful companion would take my hand and hold it with a fond pressure, renewed again and again; blushing softly, gazing in my face with languid and burning eyes, and breathing so fast that her dress rose and fell with the tumultuous respiration. It was like the ardour of a lover; it embarrassed me; it was hateful and yet overpowering; and with gloating eyes she drew me to her, and her hot lips travelled along my cheek in kisses; and she would whisper, almost in sobs, "You are mine, you shall be mine, and you and I are one for ever." (Carmilla, Chapter 4).

As with later literary vampires from the 19th century, Carmilla reflects the cultural mores around not only sexuality, but also religious fears. In chapter six, the narrator remarks on the fact that she has never witnessed Carmilla praying:

I often wondered whether our pretty guest ever said her prayers. I certainly had never seen her upon her knees. In the morning she never came down until long after our family prayers were over, and at night she never left the drawing-room to attend our brief evening prayers in the hall. If it had not been that it had casually come out in one of our careless talks that she had been baptised, I should have doubted her being a Christian. Religion was a subject on which I had never heard her speak a word. If I had known the world better, this particular neglect or antipathy would not have so much surprised me. (Carmilla, Chapter 6).

Further, Carmilla is witnessed being harshly dismissive of funerary practices and hymns being sung in grief in an incident described in chapter four:

"You pierce my ears," said Carmilla, almost angrily, and stopping her ears with her tiny fingers. "Besides, how can you tell that your religion and mine are the same; your forms wound me, and I hate funerals. What a fuss! Why you' must die—everyone must die; and all are happier when they do. Come home." (Carmilla, Chapter 4).

Thus, while Carmilla is a story of feminine relationships, it is also making a clear link between her vampiric nature and her antipathy towards Christianity. This revulsion towards Christian religion, along with her shapeshifting, nocturnal habits, and sleeping in a coffin would all be shared with later vampires in fiction, including Bram Stoker's Dracula. However, unlike many later interpretations, Carmilla was unaffected by sunlight and is not depicted as being incapable of human emotions or attachments. Ultimately, these vampiric elements serve to further the novel's depiction of perverse temptation and metaphysical consequences for the narrator, which firmly root the story in the Gothic tradition.

Some critics, among them William Veeder, suggest that Carmilla, notably in its outlandish use of narrative frames, was an important influence on Henry James' The Turn of the Screw (1898).

=== Bram Stoker's Dracula ===
Le Fanu's work has been noted as an influence on Bram Stoker's masterwork of the genre, Dracula:

- Both stories are told in the first person. Dracula expands on the idea of a first person account by creating a series of journal entries and logs of different persons and creating a plausible background story for their having been compiled.
- Both authors indulge the air of mystery, though Stoker takes it further than Le Fanu by allowing the characters to solve the enigma of the vampire along with the reader.
- The descriptions of the title character in Carmilla and of Lucy in Dracula are similar. Additionally, both women sleepwalk.
- Stoker's Dr. Abraham Van Helsing is similar to Le Fanu's vampire expert Baron Vordenburg: both characters investigate and catalyze actions in opposition to the vampire.
- The symptoms described in Carmilla and Dracula are highly comparable.
- Both the titular antagonists—Carmilla and Dracula, respectively—pretend to be the descendants of much older nobles bearing the same names, but are eventually revealed to have the same identities. However, with Dracula, this is left ambiguous. Although it is stated by Van Helsing (a character with a slightly awkward grasp of the English language) that he "must, indeed, have been that Voivode Dracula who won his name against the Turk, over the great river on the very frontier of Turkey-land", the next statement begins with "If it be so", thereby leaving a thin margin of ambiguity.
- "Dracula's Guest", a short story by Stoker believed to have been a deleted prologue to Dracula, is also set in Styria, where an unnamed Englishman takes shelter in a mausoleum from a storm. There, he meets a female vampire, named Countess Dolingen von Gratz.

== In popular culture ==
=== Books ===
- The novella Carmilla and Laura by S.D. Simper is a reimagining of the original novella. In Carmilla and Laura, the two women develop a true romantic relationship.
- The novel Carmilla: The Wolves of Styria is a re-imagining of the original story. It is a derivative re-working, listed as being authored by J.S. Le Fanu and David Brian.
- Theodora Goss's 2018 novel European Travel for the Monstrous Gentlewoman (the second in The Extraordinary Adventures of the Athena Club series) features a heroic Carmilla and her partner Laura Jennings aiding The Athena Club in their fight against a villainous Abraham Van Helsing.
- Rachel Klein's 2002 novel The Moth Diaries features several excerpts from Carmilla, as the novel figures into the plot of Klein's story, and both deal with similar subject matter and themes. The book was adapted in a feature film in 2011 written and directed by Mary Harron.
- Undead Girl Murder Farce is a Japanese light novel series by Yugo Aosaki that began publication in 2015. Many of the characters in the series are from 19th-century European literature. Carmilla is a recurring antagonist. This also has manga and anime adaptations.
- An Education in Malice by S.T. Gibson retells Carmilla in Massachusetts at a 1960s college.
- Hungerstone (2025) by Kat Dunn tells the story of Lenore, a troubled Victorian wife, whose life is changed after meeting Carmilla. The book contains many elements from the original story.

=== Comics ===
- In 1991, Aircel Comics published a six-issue black and white miniseries of Carmilla by Steven Jones and John Ross. It was based on Le Fanu's story and billed as "The Erotic Horror Classic of Female Vampirism". The first issue was printed in February 1991. The first three issues adapted the original story, while the latter three were a sequel set in the 1930s.
- In 2023, Dark Horse Comics's Berger Books imprint published Carmilla: The First Vampire written by Amy Chu with art by Soo Lee and set in 1990s New York City. Snippets from the original story are used as the main character consults the original story while investigating a series of murders. The collected edition went on to win the Bram Stoker Award for Superior Achievement in a Graphic Novel

=== Film ===
- Danish director Carl Dreyer loosely adapted Carmilla for his film Vampyr (1932) but deleted any references to lesbian sexuality. The credits of the original film say that the film is based on In a Glass Darkly. This collection contains five tales, one of which is Carmilla. The film draws its central character, Allan Gray, from Le Fanu's Dr. Hesselius; and the scene in which Gray is buried alive is drawn from "The Room in the Dragon Volant".
- Dracula's Daughter (1936), Universal Pictures' sequel to 1931 Dracula film, was loosely based on Carmilla.
- French director Roger Vadim's Et mourir de plaisir (shown in the UK and US as Blood and Roses, 1960) is based on Carmilla. The Vadim film thoroughly explores the lesbian implications behind Carmilla's selection of victims, and boasts cinematography by Claude Renoir. The film's lesbian eroticism was, however, significantly cut for its US release. Annette Stroyberg, Elsa Martinelli and Mel Ferrer star in the film.
- A more-or-less faithful adaptation starring Christopher Lee was produced in Italy in 1963 under the title La cripta e l'incubo (Crypt of the Vampire in English). The character of Laura, played by Adriana Ambesi, fears herself possessed by the spirit of a dead ancestor, played by Ursula Davis (also known as Pier Anna Quaglia).
- The Vampire Lovers (1970), the first of film in The Karnstein Trilogy was based on the novel and featured Ingrid Pitt as Carmilla.
- The Blood Spattered Bride (1972) (La novia ensangrentada) is a 1972 Spanish horror film written and directed by Vicente Aranda, is based on the text. The film has reached cult status for its mix of horror, vampirism and seduction with lesbian overtones. British actress Alexandra Bastedo plays Mircalla Karnstein, and Maribel Martín is her victim.
- The 2000 Japanese anime film Vampire Hunter D: Bloodlust features Carmilla "the Bloody Countess" as its primary antagonist. Having been slain by Dracula for her vain and gluttonous tyranny, Carmilla's ghost attempts to use the blood of a virgin to bring about her own resurrection. She was voiced by Julia Fletcher in English and Beverly Maeda in Japanese.
- In the direct-to-video movie The Batman vs. Dracula (2005), Carmilla Karnstein is mentioned as Count Dracula's bride, who had been incinerated by sunlight years ago. Dracula hoped to revive her by sacrificing Vicki Vale's soul, but the ritual was stopped by the Batman.
- Carmilla is featured as the main antagonist in the movie Lesbian Vampire Killers (2009), a comedy starring Paul McGann and James Corden, with Silvia Colloca as Carmilla.
- The book is directly referenced several times in the 2011 film, The Moth Diaries, the film version of Rachel Klein's novel. There are conspicuous similarities between the characters in "Carmilla" and those in the film, and the book figures into the film's plot.
- The Unwanted (2014) from writer/director Brent Wood relocates the story to the contemporary southern United States, with Hannah Fierman as Laura, Christen Orr as Carmilla, and Kylie Brown as Millarca.
- The Curse of Styria (2014), alternately titled Angels of Darkness is an adaptation of the novel set in late 1980s with Julia Pietrucha as Carmilla and Eleanor Tomlinson as Lara.
- In 2017 The Carmilla Movie, based on the 2015 web series of the same name was released. Directed by Spencer Maybee and produced by Steph Ouaknine, the movie follows up the web series five years after the finale.
- Carmilla (2019), written and directed by Emily Harris, was inspired by the novella. Fifteen-year-old Lara (Hannah Rae) develops feelings for Carmilla (Devrim Lingnau), but her strict governess believes their strange houseguest is a vampire. Harris says she "stripped back" the supernatural layers to consider the story as a "derailed love story" and "a story about our tendency as humans to demonize the other".

=== Music ===
==== Opera ====
- A chamber opera version of Carmilla appeared in Carmilla: A Vampire Tale (1970), music by Ben Johnston, script by Wilford Leach. Seated on a sofa, Laura and Carmilla recount the story retrospectively in song.

==== Rock music ====
- Jon English released a song named "Carmilla", inspired by the short story, on his 1980 album Calm Before the Storm.
- The title track of the album Symphonies of the Night (2013), by the German/Norwegian band Leaves' Eyes, was inspired by Carmilla.

=== Periodicals ===
- A Japanese lesbian magazine is named after Carmilla, as Carmilla "draws hetero women into the world of love between women".

=== Radio ===
- The Columbia Workshop presented an adaptation (CBS, July 28, 1940, 30 min.). Lucille Fletcher's script, directed by Earle McGill, relocated the story to contemporary New York state and allows Carmilla (Jeanette Nolan) to claim her victim Helen (Joan Tetzel).
- In 1975, the CBS Radio Mystery Theater broadcast an adaptation by Ian Martin (CBS, July 31, 1975, rebroadcast December 10, 1975). Mercedes McCambridge played Laura Stanton, Marian Seldes played Carmilla.
- Vincent Price hosted an adaptation (reset to 1922 Vienna) by Brainard Duffield, produced and directed by Fletcher Markle, on the Sears Radio Theater (CBS, March 7, 1979), with Antoinette Bower and Anne Gibbon.
- BBC Radio 4 broadcast Don McCamphill's Afternoon Play dramatisation June 5, 2003, with Anne-Marie Duff as Laura, Brana Bajic as Carmilla and David Warner as Laura's father.

=== Stage ===
- A German language adaptation of Carmilla by Friedhelm Schneidewind, from Studio-Theatre Saarbruecken, toured Germany and other European countries (including Romania) from April 1994 until 2000.
- The Wildclaw Theater in Chicago performed a full-length adaptation of Carmilla by Aly Renee Amidei in January and February 2011.
- Zombie Joe's Underground Theater Group in North Hollywood performed an hour-long adaptation of Carmilla, by David MacDowell Blue, in February and March 2014.
- Carmilla was adapted into an award-winning one-act play called Carmilla: An American Gothic at the 2022 Orlando International Fringe Theater Festival.

=== Television ===
- In 1989, Gabrielle Beaumont directed Jonathan Furst's adaptation of Carmilla as an episode of the Showtime television series Nightmare Classics, featuring Meg Tilly as the vampire and Ione Skye as her victim Marie. Furst relocated the story to an American antebellum southern plantation.
- "Carmilla" directed by Janusz Kondratiuk was a television spectacle aired on Polish Television Channel 1 on 13 November 1980.
- Carmilla is a major antagonist in the Castlevania animated series, where she was first introduced in Season 2 as a secondary antagonist, acting as a sly and ambitious general on Dracula's War Council. Unlike her video-game counterpart, who is immensely faithful to her leader, Carmilla takes issue with Dracula's plan to kill off their only source of food and has designs to take Dracula's place and build her own army to subjugate humanity alongside her Council of Sisters, Lenore (inspired by Laura), Striga, and Morana. Her plans are bolstered by Dracula's death at the hands of his son, Alucard, and her kidnapping of the Devil Forgemaster, Hector. She is later personally confronted by Isaac, Dracula's other loyal Devil Forgemaster, when he and his Night Creature horde invade her castle in Styria to rescue Hector and put an end to her ambitions. After singlehandedly fighting him and his host of demons, she commits suicide in Season 4.

=== Web series ===
- Carmilla is a web series on YouTube starring Natasha Negovanlis as Carmilla and Elise Bauman as Laura. First released on August 19, 2014, it is a comedic, modern adaptation of the novella which takes place at a modern-day university, where both girls are students. They become roommates after Laura's first roommate mysteriously disappears and Carmilla moves in, taking her place. The final episode of the web series was released on October 13, 2016. In 2017, a movie was made based on the series. The Carmilla Movie was initially released on October 26, 2017, to Canadian audiences through Cineplex theatres for one night only. A digital streaming version was also pre-released on October 26, 2017, for fans who had pre-ordered the film on VHX. The following day the movie enjoyed a wide release on streaming platform Fullscreen.

=== Video games ===
- Carmilla is a recurring character in Castlevania, a gothic horror action-adventure video game series and media franchise about Dracula, created and developed by Konami. Castlevania has also been expanded into comic books and an animated television series.
- In the gacha mobile game Fate/Grand Order, Carmilla is a summonable 4 star servant in the Assassin class and one of the possible free starting servants.
- In the Japanese action game series Onechanbara, Carmilla is the matriarch of the Vampiric clan. She appears in the 2011 title Onechanbara Z ~ Kagura ~ as the manipulator & main antagonist of sister heroines Kagura and Saaya, first using them to attack her rivals before trying (and failing) to eliminate them as pawns.
- Carmilla is a playable character in Ravenswatch, a fantasy action game which features a variety of cultural and literary characters.
- In Limbus Company, one of the enemies the player can fight, called "Four-hundred Roses", references Carmilla. The references are both direct, as represented by the E.G.O. gifts related to said enemy that are called "Carmilla" and "Millarca", and indirect, as its abilities all revolve around blood.

== Censorship ==
During the 20th century, Spanish censors allowed Carmilla to be imported from Argentina in 1941 and republished in the 1960s and 1970s without requiring edits. The censors did not comment on erotic elements of the story or the book's illustrations of naked women in suggestive poses. Alberto Lázaro suggests that the censors did not perceive the book's lesbian themes. Lázaro states that displays of affection between women were unlikely to be perceived as sexual or romantic in Spain and England until later in the 20th century, in contrast to similar displays between men.

In April 2025, the Government of Belarus added the book to the list of printed publications containing information messages and materials, the distribution of which could harm the national interests of Belarus.
