= Elise Bauman =

Canadian actress, director, filmmaker and singer

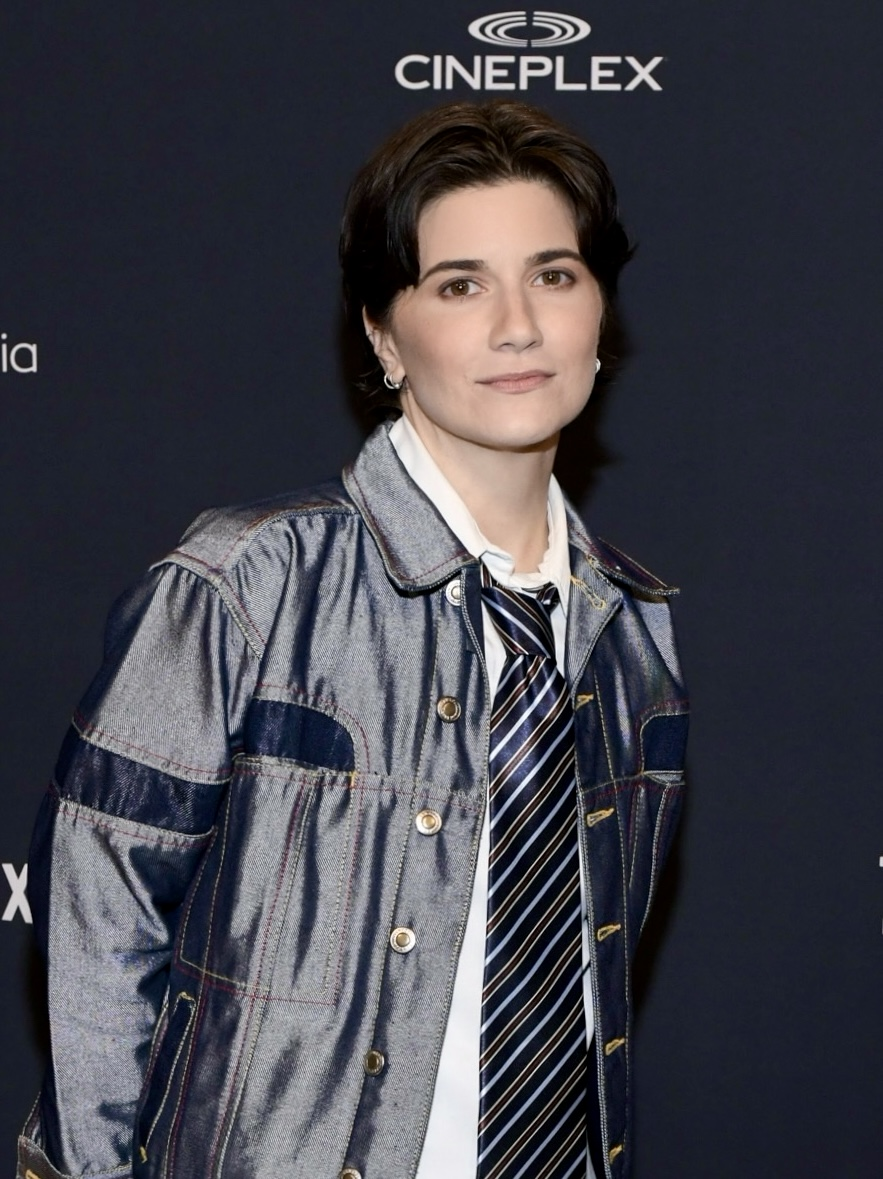
- Elise Bauman at the 13th Canadian Screen Awards
- Born: Elise Janae Bauman; Kitchener, Ontario, Canada
- Occupations: Actor, Director, Singer
- Years active: 2006–present

Elise Bauman is a Canadian actor, director and singer.

== Career ==
Bauman began working professionally in the theatre from an early age, and is a graduate of Circle in the Square Theatre School in New York City. Elise's theatre credits include Red One Theatre Collective's The Skriker, by Caryl Churchill, which garnered critical acclaim and was rated 5 N's in NOW Magazine.

Elise appears as a series regular in CBC's workplace comedy One More Time, playing olympic hopeful Jen Hauser, which was nominated for Best Ensemble Performance, Comedy at the 13th Canadian Screen Awards. Other credits include a starring role in Lifetime's first lesbian Holiday movie, Under The Christmas Tree, and recurring roles on popular comedies Letterkenny, and Workin' Moms.

Bauman is most widely known for portraying the lead role of Laura Hollis, in the web series Carmilla, based on the 1871 Gothic vampire novella of the same name by J. Sheridan Le Fanu, which amassed over 70 million views across its three season run worldwide. The series won the Canadian Screen Award for Best Digital Series, and Bauman won the Cogeco Fund Audience Choice Award at the 6th Canadian Screen Awards. Bauman reprised the role as Laura Hollis in The Carmilla Movie, a feature-length film based on the series, which was released in theatres across Canada.

== Filmography ==
Year	Title	Role	Notes	Refs.
2014	Worst Thing I Ever Did	Fallon	Episode: "For Love or Money"	
2014	The Skriker	Girl skriker		
2014	Young Badlands	Bunny	Webseries; 6 episodes	
2014–16	Carmilla	Laura Eileen Hollis	Webseries; lead role	
2015	Canadian Star	Herself	Documentary	
2015	Face the Music	Amanda	Episode: "The Abridged Pilot"	
2015	Everything's Gonna Be Pink	Theatre School Student	Feature film	
2016	Almost Adults	Mackenzie	Feature film; main role	
2016	Slasher	Elise	Episode: "Soon Your Own Eyes Will See"	
2016	Below Her Mouth	Bridget	Feature film; supporting role	
2017	Mandy Mayhem's Rapping with Actors	Herself	Episode: "Elise Bauman"	
2017	FOMO	Kris Ducksworth	Short film	
2017	The Carmilla Movie	Laura Eileen Hollis	Feature film; main role	
2017	Murdoch Mysteries	Abigail Liston	Episode: "The Accident"	
2017	The Inherent Traits of Connor James	Matilda	Short film	
2017	Becoming Burlesque	Becca		
2018	Paper Crane		Short film	
2018	The Handmaid's Tale	Jenny	Episode: "First Blood"	
2018	Frankie Drake Mysteries	Muriel Woods	Episode: "50 Shades of Greyson"	
2018	90/91	Mercedes	Short film;	
2019	Mary Kills People	Bronwyn	3 episodes	
2019	How to Buy a Baby	London	Episode: "Adopt-A-Class"	
2020	The Good Witch	Donna		
2021	Designed with Love	Maureen 'Mo' Ryder		
2021	Love in Translation	Lu Walters	Alternate Title: Speaking Your Language	
2021	Under the Christmas Tree	Alma Beltran		
2021	The Republic of Sarah	Sallie	Episode 'The Criminal It Deserves'	
2021	A New Year's Resolution	AJ		
2022	Workin' Moms	Rebecca Anderson	6 episodes	
2024	One More Time	Jen	Regular role	
2024	The Umbrella Academy	Fake Jennifer	Episode: "Jean and Gene"	
2025	The Institute	Michelle	Episode: "The Boy"	
2026	The Vampire Lestat	Russ	Episode: "Detroit"	
