= Vervegirl =

Canadian women's magazine

- Categories: Teen magazine
- Total circulation (December 2011): 145,785
- Founded: 2006
- First issue: March 2006
- Company: Youth Culture
- Country: Canada
- Based in: Toronto
- Language: English
- Website: www.vervegirl.com
- ISSN: 1714-5341

Vervegirl was a Canadian teen magazine published by Youth Culture, based in Toronto, for young women aged 13–24. The magazine engages young women through lifestyle, global causes, fashion, entertainment, career, health and beauty.

== Background ==
Published 5 times per year, Vervegirl was found in over 1,100 high schools in 600 markets.

Starting in 2005, they began releasing special issues exclusively through Wal-Mart Canada. Articles could also be found at its website, launched in June 2007, which serves as a social networking site for its readers. One article noted that sponsor Clinique had a "room" (group) in the site, but girls set up their own fan-run rooms for the same brand. The article noted how apprehensive brands were, to participate in a shift in the power dynamic between marketer and consumer.

The Toronto-based magazine launched Vervegirl Toronto, a digest-sized, city-specific publication marketed to a previously-untapped teen audience in March 2006. On March 5, 2007, the magazine announced a tour of eight Canadian high schools with Keshia Chanté, designed as a way to "connect with its readers using music" and provide "a platform for discussion on the importance of music programs in the high school curriculum." At least once, in 2007, the magazine published a supplement called Vervegirl Cause: Empower your Mind, Body and Spirit. They had a "Faces of Canada Model Search", to scout girls to pose in the magazine. Then in 2011, they teamed with Winners to host a styling contest created by Ogilvy and featuring Danny Fernandes and Mia Martina. Through an app on Facebook, contestants dressed up celebrity avatars to win a chance to style the celebrity in real life.

Those mentioned or featured in the magazine include Tyler Medeiros, Jaclyn Kenyon, Keshia Chanté, and Elise Estrada. Nina Dobrev and Lauren Collins of Degrassi: The Next Generation fame were featured in a special issue in 2007. In September 2009, the magazine featured Tracy Spiridakos to promote tween comedy series Majority Rules for Canadian network Teletoon.

Kaaren Whitney-Vernon was a president of Youth Culture Group. Xania Khan and Amanda Bloye were the editor at different points.

=== Sale to Family Communications Inc. and creation of shift2 ===
Vervegirl magazine was sold to Family Communications Inc. as of March 2014. Youthculture Inc. (the previous publisher) continued on in the youth field creating "shift2" a digital agency working with brands on YouTube.
