= Here & Queer =

Canadian web series

- Genre: Talk show, LGBTQ
- Created by: Peter Knegt
- Country of origin: Canada
- Original language: English
- No. of seasons: 6
- No. of episodes: 65

Original release
- Network: CBC
- Release: 2022

Here & Queer is a Canadian web series, which premiered in 2022 on CBC Gem. Hosted by Peter Knegt, the series is a talk show about LGBTQ arts and entertainment, with each episode centred around a conversation with one or two guests associated with a recent LGBTQ-related book, television, film or activism project.

The series won the Canadian Screen Award for Best Original Web Program or Series, Non-Fiction at the 12th Canadian Screen Awards in 2024. It won again in the same category at the 13th Canadian Screen Awards, as well as being nominated for Best Host, Web Program or Series for Knegt.

== Episodes ==
=== Season One (2022-23) ===
1. Billy Eichner on Bros
2. Tegan and Sara on High School
3. Luis De Filippis on Something You Said Last Night
4. Bilal Baig and Grace Lynn Kung on Sort Of
5. George Krissa on The Holiday Sitter
6. Matt Rogers on Have You Heard of Christmas?
7. Elegance Bratton on The Inspection
8. Chase Joynt on Framing Agnes
9. Pat Mills and Ayo Tsalithaba on their Heritage Minute about the life of Jackie Shane
10. Lido Pimienta on Lido TV

=== Season Two (2023) ===
1. Sasha Velour on The Big Reveal: An Illustrated Manifesto of Drag
2. Kristen Lovell on The Stroll
3. Elliot Page on Pageboy
4. Jordan Gavaris on The Lake
5. Ally Pankiw on I Used to Be Funny
6. Devery Jacobs on Reservation Dogs and This Place
7. Steve J. Adams and Sean Horlor on Satan Wants You
8. Vuk Lungulov-Klotz on Mutt
9. Joseph Amenta on Soft
10. Bruce LaBruce on Saint-Narcisse
11. Stephen Winter on Chocolate Babies

=== Season Three (2023-24) ===
1. Félix Maritaud and Théodore Pellerin on Solo
2. Vivek Shraya on How to Fail as a Popstar
3. Fenton Bailey on ScreenAge: How TV Shaped Our Reality, From Tammy Faye to RuPaul's Drag Race
4. Paul B. Preciado on Orlando, My Political Biography
5. Connor Jessup on Queer Was Always Here
6. Jinkx Monsoon and BenDeLaCreme on The Jinkx and DeLa Holiday Show
7. Amanda Cordner on Sort Of
8. Bruce Cohen on Rustin
9. Luke Gilford on National Anthem
10. Mark Clennon and M. H. Murray on I Don't Know Who You Are
11. Devery Jacobs and D. W. Waterson on Backspot
12. Deepa Mehta and Sirat Taneja on I Am Sirat
13. Vera Drew on The People's Joker

=== Season Four (2024-25) ===
1. Vivek Shraya and Christopher Sherman on Sex Is Sex
2. Robby Hoffman on First Theatre Tour
3. Fay Slift and Fluffy Soufflé on The Fabulous Show with Fay and Fluffy
4. Joel Kim Booster on Loot and Industry
5. Jordan Tannahill on The Listeners
6. Joshua Oppenheimer on The End
7. Rachel Morrison on The Fire Inside
8. Fabian Stumm on Sad Jokes
9. Sook-Yin Lee on Paying For It
10. J Stevens on Really Happy Someday

=== Season Five (2025-26) ===
1. Mae Martin on Wayward
2. Jeremy O. Harris and Pete Ohs on Erupcja
3. Alison Duke on Michelle Ross: Unknown Icon
4. Priyanka on Devastatia and We're Here
5. Brennan Clost on Loathe Thy Neighbor
6. Zackary Drucker on Transparent
7. Ratchapoom Boonbunchachoke on A Useful Ghost
8. Harrison Browne on Pink Light and Heated Rivalry
9. Eugene Hernandez on the Sundance Film Festival
10. Michel Ghanem on TV Scholar
11. Bretten Hannam on At the Place of Ghosts
12. Andrea Werhun and Nicole Bazuin on Modern Whore
13. Michelle Mama on Antidiva: The Carole Pope Confessions
14. Gay Jesus on Christmas in July
15. John Early on Maddie's Secret

=== Season Six (2026-27) ===
1. Karen Knox and Gwenlyn Cumyn on Slo Pitch
2. Guitarricadelafuente on La bola negra
3. Peaches on No Lube So Rude
4. Jordan Firstman on Club Kid
