= We Forgot to Break Up =

We Forgot to Break Up may refer to:

- We Forgot to Break Up (2017 film), a short film directed by Chandler Levack
- We Forgot to Break Up (2024 film), a feature film directed by Karen Knox
