= This Ain't the Rosedale Library =

Bookstore in Toronto, Canada

This Ain't the Rosedale Library was an independent bookstore located in Toronto, Ontario. Located for most of its history in the Church and Wellesley neighbourhood, the store moved to Kensington Market in May 2008, but closed in June 2010. Its name referred to Rosedale, an affluent neighbourhood of the city.

It was a general interest bookstore promoting small press publications, nontraditional and experimental fiction, LGBT literature, graphic novels, countercultural nonfiction and one of the largest selections of contemporary poetry in Canada. Because both owners were passionate about baseball, the store also had a reputation for its especially deep selection of baseball-related books; as well, the store was known for offering Toronto's largest selection of underground zines. The store had a longstanding policy of only carrying books that at least one of the owners or employees had personally read, in order to ensure that the store's values were reflected in its selection of titles.

The store was opened in 1979 by Charles Huisken, and Daniel Bazuin became co-owner in 1981. Originally located on Queen Street East between Church and Jarvis, it moved to its more familiar location near Church and Wellesley by the mid-1980s.

The bookstore had a rich history of author visits and readings, ranging from William S. Burroughs and Hunter S. Thompson to Alison Bechdel and Sarah Waters. Local scene members such as Stuart Ross, Joey Comeau, Leah Lakshmi Piepzna-Samarasinha and Marnie Woodrow made regular appearances to read and teach. The bookstore was also part of the "McSweeney's 100", the small selection of independent bookstores that were approved to sell Dave Eggers' literary magazine McSweeney's and his early novels.

In 2005, The Guardian's Jeremy Mercer named it Canada's best independent bookstore and the eighth best in the world, calling it a "model" for how an independent bookstore could survive in the changing retail climate. By this time, Bazuin and Huisken were sending signals that they were open to selling the store to a new buyer, although none materialized. At the time of their move to Kensington Market in 2008, Bazuin sold his share of the store to Huisken's son Jesse. Prior to the move, the store had considered opening the Kensington Market store as a second location while keeping the Church Street location open, but rejected the idea as financially unfeasible. Glad Day Bookshop then considered taking over the former This Ain't location on Church Street, although due to the high rent it did not do so. As one of his last major literary endeavours before selling his share of the store, Bazuin served on the jury for the 2008 Dayne Ogilvie Prize.

By 2010, however, the store was having difficulty paying its monthly rent at the new location, and it closed permanently in June of that year.

Dan Bazuin's daughter, Nicole Bazuin, is a filmmaker and photographer most noted for her collaborations with Andrea Werhun on book and film versions of Werhun's memoir Modern Whore.
