= Carlton Cuse =

American television producer and screenwriter (born 1959)

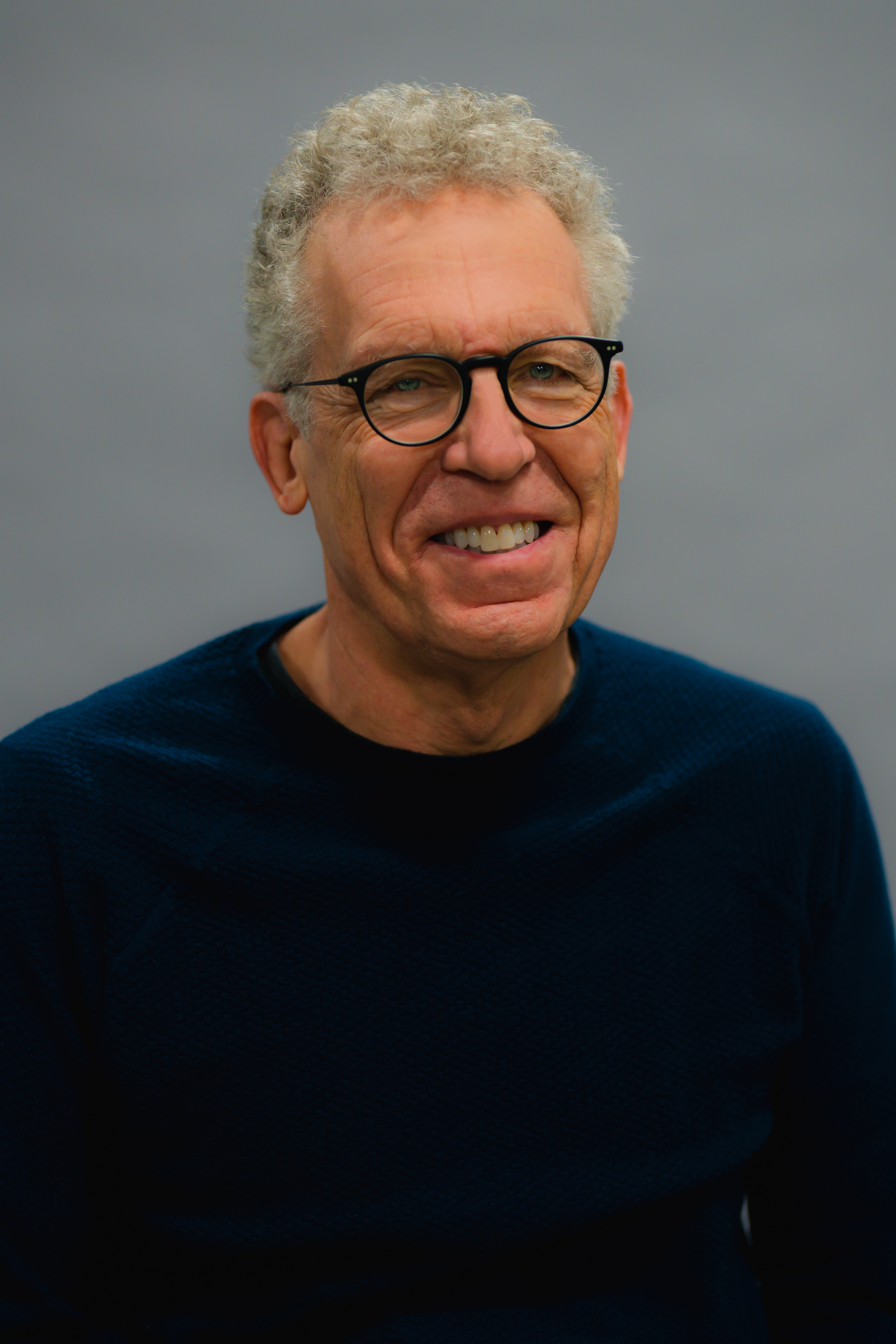
- Cuse in 2020
- Born: Arthur Carlton Cuse; March 22, 1959 (age 67); Mexico City, Mexico
- Education: Harvard University
- Occupations: Producer; screenwriter
- Years active: 1984–present
- Spouse: Christiane Hart (m. 1985)
- Children: 3

Arthur Carlton Cuse (born March 22, 1959) is an American screenwriter, showrunner, producer, and director, best known for the American television series Lost, for which he made the Time list of the 100 most influential people in the world in 2010.

== Early life and education ==
Arthur Carlton Cuse was born in Mexico City, Mexico. His father was working in Mexico for Cuse's grandfather, who had a machine-tool manufacturing business. Cuse's paternal grandfather was Latvian, of Baltic German heritage. After a few years in Mexico City, his parents moved to Boston, Massachusetts. A few years later, his father accepted a job in Tustin, California where Cuse attended El Dorado Private School, in Orange. Cuse was raised a Roman Catholic. He went to boarding school at the Putney School in Vermont. The school was on a working dairy farm, and placed a strong emphasis on an education in the arts, music, and the outdoors. At the Putney School, Cuse said that he realized he wanted to be a writer.

Cuse attended Harvard University (class of 1981) and was recruited at freshmen registration by Ted Washburn for the rowing team. In his words, he became "a hardcore athlete". Cuse's original plan was to attend medical school, but he instead majored in American history. During his junior year at Harvard, Cuse organized a test screening for the makers of the Paramount film Airplane!. The producers wanted to record the audience reaction to time the final cut of the jokes in the film. Cuse said then was when he started thinking about a career in film.

== Career ==
Cuse is known for his groundbreaking cross-genre storytelling, pioneering work in interactive media, collaborative achievements, and mentorship of many screenwriters who went on to become showrunners of television series.

=== Beginnings ===
Cuse teamed up with a Harvard classmate, Hans Tobeason, and made a documentary about rowing at Harvard called Power Ten. He convinced actor, writer, and fellow Harvard graduate George Plimpton to narrate the film. After graduating, Cuse headed for Hollywood, and worked as an assistant to a studio head, then as a script reader. By working as a reader, Cuse said he gained insight into what made good scripts work.

In 1984, Cuse took a job working as an assistant producer for Bernard Schwartz and then spent a year and a half working on Sweet Dreams, directed by Karel Reisz, starring Jessica Lange and Ed Harris. He described the experience as his version of film school. After helping a writer, David J. Burke, with a feature script, Cuse was hired as a writer on the Michael Mann series Crime Story, for which David J. Burke wrote the pilot. In 1986, Cuse wrote two teleplays for the series.

=== Film ===
Cuse formed a partnership with feature writer Jeffrey Boam, with whom he helped develop the films Lethal Weapon 2, Lethal Weapon 3, and Indiana Jones and the Last Crusade.

==== San Andreas (2015) ====
Cuse wrote the screenplay for the 2015 disaster film San Andreas. The film was directed by Brad Peyton, starred Dwayne Johnson, and was released in the United States on May 29, 2015. San Andreas was the #1 film for Warner Bros in 2015, grossing $473.5 million worldwide. In a 2026 industry analysis, Puck noted that San Andreas (2015) grossed $474.6 million worldwide on a $110 million budget and “reigns … as the top-earning live-action original to come out of Hollywood in the past decade.” The film was not based on pre-existing IP and, at the time of the report, remained one of the highest-grossing non-franchise live-action releases of its era.

==== Rampage (2018) ====
Cuse and Ryan Condal rewrote Ryan Engle's screenplay adaptation of the video game franchise Rampage. The film, reuniting Cuse and Condal with San Andreas director Brad Peyton, producer Beau Flynn, and star Dwayne Johnson, began production in early April 2017 for New Line/Warner Bros. The film premiered on April 13, 2018, and was the number-one film in the U.S. its opening weekend, earning $35.8 million. Its global gross was $426 million. Rampage also had one of the best showings ever for a video game adaptation.

=== Television ===
==== The Adventures of Brisco County, Jr. (1993–1994) ====
Because of his involvement with Indiana Jones and the Last Crusade, an executive at Fox, Robert Greenblatt, asked Cuse and Boam if they would be interested in doing a television version of the old movie serials. Cuse said yes and wrote The Adventures of Brisco County, Jr., about a Harvard-educated bounty hunter who wants to avenge the death of his father, the most famous lawman in the Old West. Fox gave the go-ahead for the series. Brisco also had a science-fiction element, in the form of a mysterious orb that appears in several episodes. Boam went back to making features, leaving Cuse to write and serve as sole showrunner of the critically acclaimed series. Afterwards, Cuse gave much of the credit for the show's success to actor Bruce Campbell, who played Brisco County, Jr., the lead character. Today, 32 years later, Brisco County, Jr. holds a 92% rating on Rotten Tomatoes—a testament to its lasting appeal, genre-bending creativity, and Bruce Campbell’s standout performance.

==== Nash Bridges (1996–2001) ====
After Brisco, Cuse met Don Johnson, who had a commitment from CBS to make a new series. With Johnson's blessing, Cuse went off and wrote the pilot for Nash Bridges. Johnson liked it and CBS did, too, ordering 14 episodes off the script without making a pilot. Nash Bridges was the first series that Les Moonves greenlit as the head of CBS. It ran for six seasons and 121 episodes. On November 27, 2021, USA Network aired a two-hour original Nash Bridges film, but Cuse was not involved in the revival.

==== Martial Law (1998) ====
The success of Nash Bridges prompted Cuse to sign an overall deal with 20th Century Fox Television. Cuse created and executive produced the CBS series Martial Law, starring Arsenio Hall and Sammo Hung Kam-Bo, one of martial arts legend Jackie Chan's closest friends and collaborators. Cuse adapted the world of Hong Kong cinema to American television in a story about a Shanghai cop who comes to the LAPD on an exchange program. A team of eight top Chinese stuntmen and coordinators from Hong Kong was hired. Stanley Tong, who had directed many of Jackie Chan's biggest Hong Kong features, directed the pilot. Cuse cast Hong Kong film star Sammo Hung, making him the first Chinese actor to star as the lead in an American TV series. Cuse was showrunning both Nash Bridges and the first season of Martial Law simultaneously, writing and producing 46 episodes of television in one network season. To reduce his workload to a manageable level, Cuse stepped back from the second season of Martial Law to focus exclusively on Nash Bridges.

==== Lost (2004–2010) ====
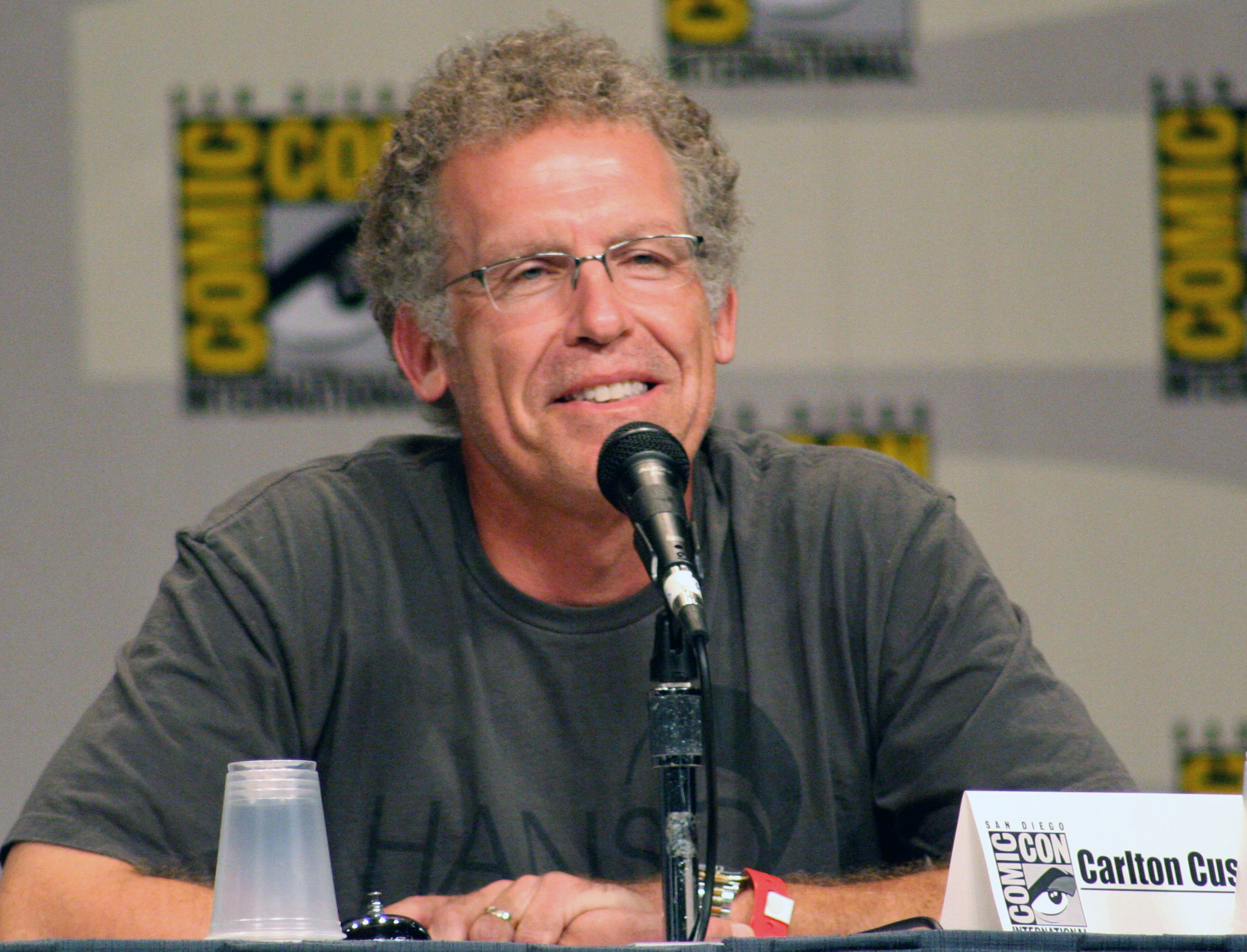
Cuse at the 2007 San Diego Comic-Con

Cuse was an executive producer and joint showrunner on Lost with Damon Lindelof. They met during the sixth season of Nash Bridges. Cuse hired Lindelof, giving him his first staff-writer job on a television series. A few years later, Lindelof and J. J. Abrams wrote the pilot for Lost. Shortly after it was shot, Abrams left the show to do Mission: Impossible III with Tom Cruise. Lindelof had no experience as a showrunner and called Cuse for showrunning advice on the side. Cuse's interest in the material and a conviction that he could turn Lost into a long-running series led him to opt out of a lucrative studio deal elsewhere to take the job as showrunner. He subsequently trained Lindelof to be his co-showrunner, and together they led the show for all of its six-year run.

The Cuse/Lindelof partnership was very productive. They wrote roughly a third of the episodes together, as well as showrunning the series in tandem, overseeing all the creative work on the series, including all story construction, rewrites, casting, production, editing, music, and marketing. The Ringer ranked a Lost episode, "The Constant" written by Cuse and Lindelof, as the top TV episode of the century.

While ostensibly about a group of plane crash survivors trying to return to civilization, Cuse and Lindelof said the show thematically was about people who are metaphorically lost in their lives and seeking to find themselves again. Cuse said that Lost "showed that it was possible on network TV to tell a highly complex, serialized narrative with intentional ambiguity‚ leaving the audience room to debate and discuss the meaning and intentions of the narrative‚ and still find a large audience."

Lost has regularly been ranked by critics as one of the greatest television series of all time. The first season had an estimated average of 16 million viewers per episode on ABC. During its sixth and final season, the show averaged over 11 million U.S. viewers per episode. Lost was the recipient of hundreds of industry award nominations throughout its run and won numerous of these awards, including the Emmy Award for Outstanding Drama Series in 2005, Best American Import at the British Academy Television Awards in 2005, the Golden Globe Award for Best Drama in 2006, and a Screen Actors Guild Award for Outstanding Ensemble in a Drama Series.

Lost was the first program with an official TV podcast, with the showrunners breaking down episodic details weekly. Lindelof and Cuse helped start the trend of showrunners becoming celebrities, often as prominent as the actors themselves in TV series.

Cuse says he wanted to use other media to tell stories that would never make it onto the network show. Cuse and Lindelof created the first alternative reality game (ARG) that connected as a narrative into a network TV show. Cuse believes this ARG redefined the way in which the internet and a TV show could be integrated, and broke new ground in how a TV show could be marketed. Lost was also the first TV network series show to create original content for mobile phones. Their last ARG, Dharma Wants You‚ won an Emmy in 2009 for Creative Achievement in Interactive Media.

The Writers Guild of America, in citing Lost as one of the 101 Best Written TV Series, described the show as "A pastiche of genres...co-mingled to intoxicating effect...[pushing] the idea of how much narrative ground you could cover in television...The ingenuous structure worked both as drama and metaphor. The emotional and psychological mapping of the characters conversed with the show's more elusive map, the one that would get the castaways off the island."

In May 2023, Cuse and Lindelof were accused of fostering a "toxic workplace" by several cast members and writers during their tenure on Lost. Lindelof acknowledged responsibility for creating the culture and apologized, citing his personal failings during this time period.

As Lost marked its 20th anniversary in September of 2024, numerous retrospectives highlighted the show's profound impact on television and its enduring success. The Wrap noted the innovative storytelling, the blend of high-concept mysteries and deep character development, which set new standards for TV narratives. In addition, USA Today wrote that Lost fundamentally altered the TV viewing experience and the way audience consumed television, saying, "These days, watching a show and then listening to podcasts, reading recaps and browsing subreddits that pick the episode apart is simply how we consume it. While certain aspects of that ritual existed before 2004, Lost played a significant role in cementing this process of consumption for the mainstream viewer." The 20th anniversary also brought a resurgence of popularity, The Hollywood Reporter notes Lost finishing the week of October 21-27, 2024 as the #1 show among library series on all the streaming services.

==== Bates Motel (2013–2017) ====
Cuse was the creator, writer, showrunner, and executive producer with Kerry Ehrin of the A&E series Bates Motel, which premiered on March 18, 2013, on the A&E Network. The series was described as a "contemporary prequel" to the 1960 film Psycho and follows the formative years of Norman Bates and his relationship with his mother, Norma, prior to the events portrayed in the Hitchcock film. The first season received critical praise, with Vera Farmiga (Norma Bates) being nominated for the Primetime Emmy Award for Outstanding Lead Actress in a Drama Series in 2013. The series followed Cuse and Ehrin's original plan to run for five seasons of 10 episodes each for a total of 50 episodes. An episode of Bates Motel in season 4, entitled "Forever", written by Cuse with Kerry Ehrin, made The New York Times' list of memorable 2016 TV episodes and The Hollywood Reporter's list of the best 2016 TV episodes. For its final season, Bates Motel also won 2017 People's Choice awards for Favorite Cable Drama, and Favorite Actor and Actress for Freddie Highmore and Vera Farmiga. In the fifth and final season, Cuse himself appeared in a cameo role, opposite R&B superstar Rihanna, as a highway patrol officer. Both Seasons 4 and 5 of Bates Motel have 100% perfect ratings on the rating site, Rotten Tomatoes.

==== The Strain (2014–2017) ====
Cuse was showrunner, executive producer, developer, and writer of The Strain, an FX drama series based on the vampire novel trilogy by co-authors Guillermo del Toro and Chuck Hogan. Del Toro co-wrote and directed the pilot episode. The Strain premiered on July 13, 2014. Cuse made his directorial debut with The Strain's third-season finale. Cuse and del Toro decided to end the series after the fourth season of their own accord, feeling it was the right time to bring the story to a close on their own terms. "The idea was always to do three seasons of the show when we sold it. Going into season four, it really felt like we needed to increase the storytelling velocity and finish the story." The 4th and final season has a 100% rating on Rotten Tomatoes. The editors concluded: "The Strain concludes on a high note with a climactic season that will remind viewers of the series' initial bite." Collider agreed, writing, "The Strain delivers propulsive drama and world building. In the final season, the talented cast, the gorgeous effects, and the singular cinematographic aesthetic are matched [by] bold narrative moves and satisfying character beats."

==== The Returned (2015) ====
Cuse was showrunner, co-developer, writer, and executive producer of The Returned, based on the popular and International Emmy Award-winning French suspense series Les Revenants, adapted by Fabrice Gobert and inspired by the feature film, They Came Back, directed by Robin Campillo. Raelle Tucker also served as showrunner and executive producer. The 10-episode first season premiered on March 9, 2015. The series focused on a small town that is turned upside down when several local people, who have been long presumed dead, suddenly reappear. The Returned was co-produced by A+E Studios and FremantleMedia North America in association with Haut et Court TV SAS, the producer of the French series. The show was cancelled after one season in June 2015.

==== Colony (2016–2018) ====
Cuse and Ryan Condal served as creators, showrunners, and executive producers of Colony for the USA Network, a co-production between Legendary Television and Universal Cable Prods. Colony "is a family drama/thriller about life in Los Angeles after a mysterious 'foreign' occupation, and the efforts by the proxy government to crush the growing resistance movement." Academy Award-winning Argentinian director Juan José Campanella directed the pilot. Colony stars Josh Holloway and Sarah Wayne Callies. The ten episode first season of Colony premiered on January 14, 2016. On February 4, 2016, USA Network renewed Colony for a second season, ordering thirteen episodes. Colony was among the Top 10 scripted first season dramas on ad-supported cable. In season 2, Colony was the number one cable scripted series on Thursday nights in total viewers. On April 4, 2017, Colony was renewed for a third season (which ended up being the last due to cancellation), with production moving from Los Angeles to Vancouver. Overall, Colony earned a 92% on Rotten Tomatoes for its three season run.

Despite declining viewership and its cancellation after three seasons, Colony has been retrospectively reassessed as an underappreciated science-fiction series. Author Stephen King praised the show during its original run, describing it as “smart, suspenseful, subversive… [and] thought-provoking.” In later interviews following the show’s cancellation, star Josh Holloway stated that the series was originally planned to run five or six seasons and would have culminated in a large-scale intergalactic conflict, noting that the abrupt ending was “heartbreaking,” while also acknowledging the show’s enduring following due to its writing quality.

==== Tom Clancy's Jack Ryan (2018–2023) ====
Cuse and writer Graham Roland created a TV series based on Jack Ryan, the CIA analyst character, created by novelist Tom Clancy in the 1980s. Cuse served as the showrunner for the first two seasons of the series. The show was an original story that borrowed from rather than adapting any of Clancy's work. The series stars John Krasinski as Ryan, "an up-and-coming CIA analyst as he uncovers a pattern in terrorist communication that launches him into the center of a dangerous gambit with a new breed of terrorism that threatens destruction on a global scale". Amazon Video gave the series an eight-episode, straight-to-series order. Cuse co-wrote, with Roland, five of the eight episodes for the first season and directed one. He co-wrote three episodes in season two.

As of the second season, Jack Ryan was the most-watched series ever on Amazon Prime Video, according to Nielsen.

In March 2019, Cuse announced he was stepping back from day-to-day showrunner duties of Jack Ryan after the second season to focus on other projects. He would remain involved in Jack Ryan as an executive producer.

Ahead of the third season, Amazon renewed the series for a fourth season which premiered on June 29, 2023 and concluded on July 14.

==== Locke & Key (2020–2022) ====
Cuse was showrunner, executive producer, developer, writer and director of Locke & Key, an adaptation of Joe Hill's comic-book series. Cuse's Genre Arts production company, and IDW Entertainment produced the series. The series was created by Hill and developed by Cuse, Aron Eli Coleite, and Meredith Averill. Locke & Key was a horror/fantasy series that revolves around three siblings, who after the gruesome murder of their father, move to their ancestral home in Massachusetts, only to find the house has magical keys that give them a vast array of powers and abilities. Little do they know, a devious demon also wants the keys, and will stop at nothing to attain them.

Netflix picked up Locke & Key, committing to a 10-episode order after Hulu passed in March 2018. For Netflix, Cuse redeveloped and recast the show and did not use any of an existing Hulu pilot. The show debuted on Netflix on February 7, 2020. Locke & Key was the top binge show on the TV time chart for the weeks ending February 16 and 23, 2020. In addition, Forbes reported that Locke and Key was number two on the list of most watched Netflix original and limited series of 2020. Locke & Key was renewed for a second season. Production began on September 21, 2020, in Toronto. On December 18, 2020, Locke & Key was renewed for Season 3 ahead of the Season 2 premiere. On January 19, 2021, Netflix CEO Ted Sarandos announced on a quarterly investor call that Locke & Key was a Top 10 show worldwide for 2020 based on Google search metrics. Season 2 premiered on October 22, 2021. With its Season 2 launch, Locke & Key was immediately back among the most popular titles on Netflix. Shortly after its debut, the series was in the No. 3 spot on Netflix's Top 10 TV shows list as well as the Top 10 overall list for movies and series. Season 2 surpassed the Season 1 ratings of 76% from certified Rotten Tomatoes critics, with an 86% score. One month after release Locke & Key was the number 2 most viewed show by minutes on Netflix with 1.07 billion.

==== Five Days at Memorial (2022) ====
Cuse and John Ridley together wrote all eight episodes of Five Days at Memorial. Cuse and Ridley jointly served as the showrunners for the eight hour limited series. Two episodes were directed by Cuse, three were directed by Ridley, and three were directed by Wendey Stanzler. It is based on the 2013 book Five Days at Memorial: Life and Death in a Storm-Ravaged Hospital by New York Times journalist Sheri Fink. Her original reporting for the Times and ProPublica, depicting the difficulties a New Orleans hospital endured after Hurricane Katrina made landfall on the city, led to her being awarded the Pulitzer Prize. The series stars Vera Farmiga as Dr. Anna Pou and Cherry Jones as Susan Mulderick. The first three episodes of Five Days at Memorial launched August 12, 2022, on AppleTV+, followed by a new one every Friday through September 16, 2022.

Critical reception was positive. The Guardian had this to say: "Set almost wholly within the increasingly fetid and hopeless confines of Memorial hospital – with each of the first five episodes devoted to a single one of the five fateful days in 2005 that unfolded after Hurricane Katrina made landfall – it is utterly brutal and utterly compelling. ...Every performance (especially Vera Farmiga as Dr Anna Pou, Julie Ann Emery as nurse Diane Robichaux and Raven Dauda as the daughter eventually forced to abandon her dying mother) is quietly brilliant." Rachel Syme wrote in The New Yorker, "If you have the stomach to dig into a nightmarish tale of systemic failure and murky medical ethics, you'll be rewarded with truly masterly performances. You'll also be filled with sorrow and rage." In Hollywood Life's Best Shows of 2022, they wrote, "Five Days At Memorial wasn't just one of the best shows of 2022, it's one of the most important series to come out in a long time."

==== Pulse (2025) ====
On February 29, 2024, the announcement came that Cuse would be the showrunner and executive producer of Netflix's first American medical series, Pulse. Zoe Robyn wrote the pilot. The greenlight for Pulse came after Cuse and Robyn, overseeing a writers room throughout 2023, guided the development of scripts.

The show examined the lives of the staff of Miami's busiest Level 1 Trauma Center, who navigate medical emergencies, and it followed young ER doc Danny Simms, who is unexpectedly promoted to Chief Resident amidst the fallout of her own provocative romantic relationship.

The show starred Willa Fitzgerald, Colin Woodell, Justina Machado, Jack Bannon, Jessie T. Usher, Chelsea Muirhead, Daniela Nieves, and Jessy Yates. Production began in March 2024. The first episode aired on April 3, 2025. The show was canceled after one season. On Netflix's July 2025 semi-annual viewership report, Pulse ranked #30 out of 7,514 listed titles on the service. But according to Deadline, despite solid initial viewership, Pulse may have been hurt by launching as the last of five new medical dramas within a six-month span, as well as by its central theme of workplace sexual harassment—considered too ambitious and provocative for viewers seeking a more escapist medical drama. The series marked Netflix’s first foray into American medical drama and showcased Cuse’s range in developing bold, genre-expanding projects.

==== The Secret of Secrets (2026) ====
In 2025, Cuse and Dan Brown were announced as co-creators and executive producers of a Netflix series based on The Secret of Secrets, the sixth Dan Brown novel featuring Robert Langdon. Cuse also serves as the series' writer and showrunner. In 2026, Morgan Spector was cast as Langdon, with Rebecca Hall as Katherine Solomon. Production began in September 2026.

==== Mentorship ====
Cuse is well known for his successful mentorship of other screenwriters. He has long advocated that working in collaboration with other writers is the best methodology of achieving creative success in television. Cuse has stated, "The idea that lone genius is the highest form of creativity is a myth. I believe that collaboration is at the foundation of most great creative achievements. The demands of showrunning are huge and, for me, the best creative work comes from working hand-in-hand with another writer."

Over 30 writers who have worked with Cuse have gone on to run their own shows, including Damon Lindelof, Shawn Ryan, Kerry Ehrin, Raelle Tucker, Meredith Averill, Pam Veasey, Ryan Condal and Graham Roland. In 2015, for his mentorship work Cuse was given Variety's Creative Leadership Award at their annual event for Hollywood's New Leaders, with the award being presented by Damon Lindelof.

==== Additional ====
The character of Carlton (Alfonso Ribeiro) on The Fresh Prince of Bel-Air, was named after Cuse. Andy and Susan Borowitz, the series's creators, were both friends and classmates of Cuse's at Harvard.

Following the January 2026 U.S. operation that captured Venezuelan president Nicolás Maduro, a clip from Tom Clancy’s Jack Ryan Season 2 (2019) circulated widely online, with commentators noting "prophetic" similarities between the season’s storyline and real-world events. The scene highlights Venezuela’s strategic importance, emphasizing its natural resources and geopolitical position. Cuse rejected characterizations of the season as “prophetic,” stating that the story came from "our desire to tell a fictional story about the forces at play, not from imagining an outcome," adding that it was developed in 2017–18 as a plausible geopolitical narrative based on existing conditions in Venezuela, including political instability, economic collapse, and international interest in its resources, rather than as a prediction of future events.

CNN’s Jake Tapper described the resemblance as “truth following fiction following truth,” attributing the parallels to long-standing geopolitical realities rather than foresight or coincidence.

During casting for the series, Bates Motel, Timothée Chalamet auditioned for the role of Norman Bates as a teenager. He was told the character was "a young Psycho," so he searched Netflix for the film — but the first result was American Psycho (2000). He prepared by watching that instead and later joked that his audition was a Patrick Bateman impression that was "way off tonally." The role went to Freddie Highmore.

== Filmography ==
=== Film ===
- San Andreas (2015)
- Rampage (2018)

=== Television ===
The numbers in directing and writing credits refer to the number of episodes.

| Title | Year | Credited as | | | | Network | Notes |
| Title | Year | Creator | Director | Writer | Executive producer | Network | Notes |
|---|---|---|---|---|---|---|---|
| Crime Story | 1986 | No | No | Yes (2) | No | NBC | |
| Headin' Home for the Holidays | 1986 | No | No | Yes | No | NBC | Amy Grant television special |
| A Promise to Keep | 1990 | No | No | Yes | Yes | NBC | Television film |
| The Adventures of Brisco County, Jr. | 1993–94 | Yes | No | Yes (8) | Yes | Fox | |
| Fortune Hunter | 1994 | No | No | Yes (2) | Yes | Fox | |
| Nash Bridges | 1996–2001 | Yes | No | Yes (35) | Yes | CBS | |
| Martial Law | 1998–2000 | Yes | No | Yes (3) | Yes | CBS | Executive producer for season 1 only |
| Black Sash | 2003 | No | No | Yes (3) | Yes | The WB | |
| Lost | 2004–10 | No | No | Yes (39) | Yes | ABC | |
| Lost: Missing Pieces | 2007–08 | No | No | Yes (2) | Yes | Verizon Wireless | Webisode series |
| Bates Motel | 2013–17 | Yes | No | Yes (13) | Yes | A&E | |
| The Strain | 2014–17 | No | Yes (1) | Yes (9) | Yes | FX | |
| The Returned | 2015 | developer | No | Yes (1) | Yes | A&E | |
| Colony | 2016–18 | Yes | No | Yes (3) | Yes | USA Network | |
| Tom Clancy's Jack Ryan | 2018–23 | Yes | Yes (1) | Yes (8) | Yes | Prime Video | |
| Locke & Key | 2020–22 | developer | Yes (1) | Yes (1) | Yes | Netflix | |
| Five Days at Memorial | 2022 | developer | Yes (2) | Yes (3) | Yes | Apple TV+ | |
| Pulse | 2025 | No | Yes (2) | Yes (2) | Yes | Netflix | |
| Secret of Secrets | 2026 | No | Yes | Yes | Yes | Netflix | |

=== Unsold television pilots ===
| Title | Year | Credited as | | Notes |
| Title | Year | Writer | Executive producer | Notes |
|---|---|---|---|---|
| The Witches of Eastwick | 1992 | Yes | Yes | |
| The Sixth Gun | 2013 | Yes | Yes | |
| Point of Honor | 2015 | Yes | Yes | Released as a television film on Prime Video |

== Awards and nominations ==
Cuse has been nominated for ten Primetime Emmy Awards for his work on Lost and has won twice: first in 2005 for Outstanding Drama Series, then in 2009 for Creative Achievement in Interactive Media. Cuse, along with Lindelof, received three nominations for Golden Globe Awards, including a win for Best Television Series – Drama in 2005. He has also received five nominations at Producers Guild of America Awards, with a win in 2006 for Television Producer of the Year Award in Episodic Drama; three nominations and wins from the American Film Institute; and twelve nominations at the Television Critics Association, including three wins in for Outstanding Achievement in Drama in 2005, 2006 and 2010, and a win for Outstanding New Program in 2005. Cuse received four nominations from the Writers Guild of America Awards, including a win in 2006 for Best Dramatic Series, and five Saturn Award nominations with four wins in 2004, 2005, 2007 and 2009 for Best Network Television Series. He also received nominations from the NAACP Image Awards, the Hugo Awards and the People's Choice Awards. In 2007, Cuse shared the British Academy Television Award for Best International Series for Lost.

In 2009, he won the Peabody Award, the Jules Verne Award, the Roma Fiction Fest Special Award, and a GQ 2009 Men of the Year Award. In 2010, Cuse was voted one of Time magazine's "100 Most Influential People in the World". He has also won the TV Guide Award for Martial Law, which was voted the Favorite New Series in 1999. In 2015, Cuse received Variety's Creative Leadership Award, following past recipients including Judd Apatow and Jerry Weintraub. That same year, Cuse won the Dan Curtis Legacy Award from the Academy of Science Fiction, Fantasy and Horror Films, for lifetime achievement. Bates Motel won the 2017 People's Choice Award for Favorite Cable TV Drama. On July 3, 2026, Carlton Cuse received the Maximo Excellence Award at the Italian Global Series (IGS) Festival in recognition of his immense contributions to serialized television. Emmy nomination, Outstanding Television Movie - 2026, Carlton Cuse, Executive Producer Tom Clancy’s Jack Ryan: Ghost War.
