= J Stevens =

Canadian cinematographer and filmmaker

J Stevens is a Canadian cinematographer, director, writer and producer. They have directed episodes of Astrid & Lilly Save the World, Sort Of, Stories From My Gay Grandparents, and are a co-creator of the streaming television comedy series Slo Pitch. Stevens is one of the first openly non-binary filmmakers in the Directors Guild of Canada, and Playback Magazine named them one of the "Top 10 Filmmakers to Watch" in 2022.

== Biography ==
J Stevens (they/them) was born and raised in Calgary, and identifies as non-binary. They attended Strathcona-Tweedsmuir School, and were an active athlete, participating in track and field, tennis, golf, cross–country running, basketball and volleyball. They were named the school's athlete of the year in junior high school, and additionally, they were on the honour roll and a school prefect. Stevens said they always thought they were going to be a professional athlete. When Stevens was in grade 10, they became interested in filmmaking when they took a film studies class. Their class project was a "one-minute, one-shot film about a blue dodge ball". Stevens recalls while filming the short video that "all of sudden it felt like all these different parts of my brain that had always worked in separate capacities just all worked as one". After graduation from high school, they worked for a local TV station and then studied filmmaking at the British Columbia Institute of Technology.

== Career ==
They started out directing and editing corporate commercials, social media content, and also worked on multiple short films. After moving to Toronto, Stevens directed episodes of the teen drama television series Astrid & Lilly Save the World, worked as a cinematographer for the short films Defund, Body So Fluorescent, Hazy Little Thing and Adult Adoption. Stevens also directed an episode of the television sitcom Sort Of in 2022.

In 2020, they co-created the web television comedy series Slo Pitch with Gwenlyn Cumyn, and Karen Knox. They also serve as a director and executive producer of the series. Stevens, Knox and Cumyn hired people for the cast and crew "who have traditionally been under-represented in the film and television industry". The majority of the cast and crew for the series are BIPOC, and individuals who identify as female, non-binary and LGBTQ+. In 2024, they directed all 10 episodes of Stories from My Gay Grandparents, and also finished production of their feature film directorial debut, Really Happy Someday, which they co-wrote and produced.

In 2022, Playback Magazine named them one of the "Top 10 Filmmakers to Watch", and they are one of the first openly non-binary filmmakers in the Directors Guild of Canada. They also received an Outstanding Directorial Achievement nomination for a comedy series at the 2022 Directors Guild of Canada Awards for Astrid & Lilly Save the World.

In 2024, Stevens received a nomination for the DGC Award for Best Direction in a Feature Film for Really Happy Someday. In January 2025, Stevens was announced as the recipient of the Toronto Film Critics Association's Jay Scott Prize for emerging filmmakers for 2024.

== Personal life ==
In 2023, they founded the non-profit organization Spindle Films Foundation, which features a program that mentors transgender, non-binary, two-spirit and gender-diverse Canadian filmmakers. They are also a member of the Canadian Society of Cinematographers, serving on the Advocacy/Outreach/Education team.

== Filmography ==
Year	Title	Notes	Ref.
2017	Soft Spot	Director	
2019	Barbelle	Cinematography	
2019	Samanthology	Director	
2020	Avocado Toast	Assistant cinematographer	
2020	Body So Fluorescent	Cinematography	
2020	Cons & Pros	Director	
2020	Hazy Little Thing	Cinematography	
2020	March	Cinematography	
2020	Slo Pitch	Co-creator, director and executive producer	
2021	Defund	Cinematography and editing	
2022	Adult Adoption	Cinematography	
2022	Alex	Cinematography and co-producer	
2022	Astrid & Lilly Save the World	Director (two episodes)	
2022	Sort Of	Director (one episode)	
2024	Stories from My Gay Grandparents	Director	
2024	Really Happy Someday	Director, producer and co-writer	
2025	The Z-Suite	Director	
