= Filial =

Filial may refer to:

- Filial church, a Roman Catholic church to which is annexed the cure of souls, but which remains dependent on another church
- Filial piety, one of the virtues in Confucian thought
- Filial hybrids, used in genetics (written as F1, F2, etc.)

== See also ==
- Filiation
