= Cuse =

Cuse may refer to:

== People ==
- Carlton Cuse (born 1959), American screenwriter, producer and director

== Places ==
- Cuse-et-Adrisans, France
- Syracuse, New York
  - Syracuse University, in the above city
  - Syracuse Orange, the university's athletic program
