= David Di Giovanni =

Canadian theatre director and playwright

David Di Giovanni is a Canadian theatre director and playwright, most noted as co-creator with Amanda Cordner of the stage play Body So Fluorescent.

Di Giovanni began his career as an actor. He appeared in early productions of Body So Fluorescent as Gary, although it later evolved into a solo show in which Cordner played all characters, including Gary, herself.

Body So Fluorescent was later adapted as a short film, for which Di Giovanni won the Emerging Canadian Artist award at the 2020 Inside Out Film and Video Festival. After it was published in book form in 2023, Cordner and Di Giovanni received a nomination for that year's Dayne Ogilvie Prize for LGBT literature.

Di Giovanni and Cordner also later collaborated on Wring the Roses.

Di Giovanni, who is out as gay, works as manager of cultural services for the Bradford West Gwillimbury Public Library.
