= Adult adoption =

Legal provision for transference of legal parentage of an adult

Adult adoption is a form of adoption between two or more adults in order to transfer inheritance rights and/or filiation. Adult adoption may be done for various reasons including: to establish intestate inheritance rights; to formalize a step-parent/step-child relationship or a foster parent/foster child relationship; or to restore the original legal relationship between a person and their biological parent(s), where that person had been adopted by other, adoptive parents previously (and usually as a child, and perhaps without the full/complete consent of the biological parent(s) due to circumstances at the time).

In Japan, adult adoption may be used in order to facilitate the continuance of a family business. This form of adoption is known as mukoyōshi ("son-in-law adoption").

Adult adoption also became a method to gain honours and hereditary titles in some jurisdictions, especially in Europe. However, such adoptions (especially where they occurred for reasons of financial need on the part of the adoptive parent) are oftentimes contested by others in the line of succession or by the family (or 'house', or 'dynasty') more generally. The Hohenzollern-Sigmaringen, Ascania and Sayn-Wittgenstein families, for example, have title-bearing adoptive members who are not recognized by other members within the dynasty.

Depending on the laws of the jurisdiction, adult adoption may not be available as a legal option. In the United Kingdom and many parts of the Commonwealth, only children (persons under the age of 18) may be adopted. The UK Adoption and Children Act 2002 states that an "application for an adoption order may only be made if the person to be adopted has not attained the age of 18 years on the date of the application."

In places where adult adoptions are permitted, such an adoption may or may not transfer filiation in addition to inheritance rights. For example, in Colorado, one can adopt an adult of age 21 or older for inheritance purposes, but filiation will remain unaffected. However, adoption of a person aged 18, 19 or 20 transfers both inheritance rights and filiation. In most other American states, both filiation and inheritance rights are transferred.

In some countries where same-sex couples have not received the same legal protections as heterosexual couples, adult adoption of a person's (life, or 'romantic', or de facto) partner has sometimes been used to try to ensure that property (in the form of a deceased's estate) can transfer to the surviving partner upon the death of the property-owner. In these cases inheritance by the adult adoptee can provide a backstop or secondary protection to implement the wishes of the deceased, even despite legal or cultural frameworks that are antagonistic to such marriage-type relationships, or hostile views of the deceased's other family members.

== Among same-sex couples ==
During the 1980s and 1990s, in absence of recognition of same-sex marriage, adult adoption was a method used by some persons who were a part of a same-sex partnership to let their surviving partner inherit their estate. The process however often involved a convoluted process of removing the former filial parent-child relationship (extant between the prospective adoptee and their biological parent(s)) and then applying for an adult adoption where their partner would be the adopter.

In the 2010 book Equality for Same-Sex Couples: The Legal Recognition of Gay Partnerships in Europe and the United States, author Yuval Merin called adult adoption among same-sex couples "problematic" and noted that it had not gained popularity as a means to "circumvent the impossibility of same-sex marriage" at that time in the U.S. It nevertheless is used as one possible strategy in some jurisdictions still, given the absence of alternatives in some places in certain periods, and given the hostility and discrimination faced by same-sex people seeking to provide for a loving partner who survives them.

== See also ==
- Adoption in Ancient Rome
- Adoptee rights
- Adult Adoption, a 2022 Canadian film
- Category: Adult adoptees
