= Couple-ish =

- Genre: Comedy-drama
- Created by: K Alexander
- Written by: K Alexander; RJ Lackie; Candice Hudson; Elizabeth Sutton
- Directed by: Christian Tribuzio; Corey Misquita
- Starring: K Alexander; Mercedes Morris; Sharon Belle; Nicholas Potter; Premika Leo
- Opening theme: "Fantasy Life" written and produced by Nicholas Potter and sung by K Alexander.
- Composer: Nicholas Potter
- Country of origin: Canada
- Original language: English
- No. of seasons: 2
- No. of episodes: 44

Production
- Executive producers: Annie Dally; Leah Dejong; Benjamin Irwin; Edna Phong; Chris Thornton; Rachel Zimmerman
- Producers: Yasmin Bertew; Kyle Dunbar; Yusuf Alvi; Jordan Lee-Tung
- Editor: Corey Misquita
- Running time: 3-10 minutes

Original release
- Release: December 9, 2015 – September 17, 2017

Couple-ish is a Canadian LGBTQ+ web series created by K Alexander, who stars alongside Mercedes Morris and Sharon Belle. The series revolves around Dee Warson, a non-binary artist, who is looking for a new roommate with the help of their sister, Amy Warson. Soon they are entangled in a government conspiracy so that their new roommate, Rachel Mannt, isn't forced to leave the country.

Couple-ish premiered on December 9, 2015 and ended on September 17, 2017, with a total of 44 episodes over the course of 2 seasons.

== Background and development ==
The series was made possible by the support of nearly 800 backers through the series Kickstarter campaign. An Indiegogo campaign was launched in November 2016 to fundraise a second season, with a fixed goal of $45,000 USD, which was successfully raised in under a month.

== Plot ==
The series begins with Dee Warson stressing out over their apartment which they cannot afford to pay rent for alone, having just lost the person who was helping with bills. Their sister, Amy Warson, suggests they get a roommate and after a little convincing, they interview several candidates. One being Rachel Mannt, an English woman who moved to Canada to attend university, who seems to meet the criteria they're looking for.

Eight months later, it comes to light that Rachel's visa will expire soon and in a desperate attempt to remain in the country, she has told the Canadian government that she and Dee are in a common law partnership. The series follows the two hosting a web show that flaunts their relationship so that when investigated, their relationship seems legitimate.

== Cast and characters ==
=== Main ===
- K Alexander as Dee Warson, a non-binary artist.
- Mercedes Morris as Amy Warson, Dee's sister.
- Sharon Belle as Rachel Mannt, Dee's roommate from London and internet girlfriend.
- Nicholas Potter as Edmond, Dee's boyfriend in season 1.
- Premika Leo as Cal, Dee's love interest in season 2

=== Supporting characters ===
- Diana Chrisman as Jamie, Rachel's co-worker.
- Tanya Filipopoulos as Lauren.
- Jaime Lujan as Cherie, Amy's friend-with-benefits.
- Stacey Iseman as Rita Warson, Dee and Amy's mother.
- Peter Mazzucco as Peter Warson, Dee and Amy's father..

== Episodes ==
=== Series overview ===
Season	Episodes	Originally released	
Season	Episodes	First released	Last released
1	22	December 9, 2015	March 9, 2016
2	22	April 29, 2017	September 17, 2017

=== Season 1 (2015–16) ===
No. overall	No. in series	Title	Running time	Original release date
1	1	"Roomie Oh Roomie"	6:45	December 9, 2015
Dee Warson is on the hunt for a roommate, having lost the other person who helps pay rent. Their sister, Amy Warson, suggests they interview candidates they find online. They meet Rachel Mannt, an English woman who came to Canada for university, and they decide she's the best fit. Eight months later, Dee finds out Rachel has applied them to be her sponsor in a common law partnership.
2	2	"Guilt Trip"	5:42	December 12, 2015
Rachel insists she only applied them for the sponsorship because her visa is ending soon and without a sponsor, she'll be deported back to London. Dee is visibly angry but Amy convinces them to go along with the lie.
3	3	"Oh, For the Love of...Mine"	3:55	December 16, 2015
The government wants to examine Dee and Rachel's supposed relationship. Dee, Amy and Rachel brainstorm over what to do and Amy suggests creating a couple's vlog.
4	4	"Channel Trailer"	2:24	December 19, 2015
Dee and Rachel create a channel trailer.
5	5	"Panic Mode"	3:49	December 23, 2015
Dee confronts Rachel about their feelings regarding work and their situation. Amy comes in with the news that their couple channel has gained considerate popularity.
6	6	"The Partner Tag"	3:08	December 26, 2015
Dee and Rachel do the Girlfriend Tag for their channel, which has over 5,000 subscribers.
7	7	"The Sense Games"	5:25	December 30, 2015
With Amy acting as the judge, Dee and Rachel play the Sense Game, where they have to find objects around the room that reminds them of each other.
8	8	"The Intervention"	4:39	January 2, 2016
Dee has a partner over, again. Rachel and Amy discuss how Dee is using sex to help them cope with events in their life. The two are interrupted by a man coming to their door scantily clothed telling them to keep it down. They decide to have an intervention for Dee.
9	9	"Lens Cap"	4:26	January 6, 2016
An attempt to play "Never Have I Ever" for their vlog ends in Dee getting their feelings hurt. Amy sees that Dee's pain comes from their recent break-up with their ex-girlfriend, Elena, who didn't respect Dee being non-binary and cheated on them. Rachel apologizes to Dee and they make amends.
10	10	"Cleaning Up"	6:19	January 9, 2016
Rachel gets fed up with Dee's messiness and decides to clean the apartment up. They enter Dee's room and find a shoe-box full of sentimental items Dee has kept of their ex. Dee discovers Rachel looking through their personal items.
11	11	"We Are Going To Have So Much Fun"	3:31	January 13, 2016
The two discuss their quarrel on a video for their channel. They work through their conflict.
12	12	"The Return of Cute Butt Guy"	4:07	February 3, 2016
Amy and Rachel discover Dee has been having the same guy over, who they refer to as 'Cute Butt Guy', several times. Dee introduces Edmond to Amy and Rachel. Edmond is told about the immigration lie.
13	13	"It's NB Deal"	4:03	February 6, 2016
Dee tells Ed that they identify as non-binary.
14	14	"C.S.Why"	4:23	February 10, 2016
Rachel admits she doesn't trust Ed. Amy suggests they interrogate Ed away from Dee.
15	15	"Terms of Endeerment"	5:54	February 13, 2016
With Dee and Ed becoming more serious, Rachel sees them being affectionate in public. Rachel explains why she can't go back to London and needs the sponsorship.
16	16	"It's My Party and I'll Lie If I Want To"	6:23	February 17, 2016
In order to have convincing photos to show the government, Dee and Rachel host a house party.
17	17	"Lie-stream"	3:34	February 20, 2016
Dee and Rachel host a livestream on their channel. Ed walks in during the stream and they all lie that Ed is Amy's boyfriend. All four of them play Truth or Dare together.
18	18	"One Time In Portland"	4:13	February 24, 2016
Dee, Amy, Rachel and Ed meet at the bar to quiz Dee and Rachel on facts about each other in light of an impending appointment to discuss their relationship. Back at the apartment, they play a drinking game and afterwards, Rachel and Amy share a kiss.
19	19	"Meet The Warsons"	8:12	February 27, 2016
After Dee and Amy's parents find the videos posted online, they invite all four to a dinner to get to know Rachel and Ed. Dee's parents misgender Dee often and after seeing Dee is visibly uncomfortable, Ed gets into an argument with the parents. The dinner quickly dissolves.
20	20	"In Another Universe"	9:38	March 2, 2016
Rachel and Amy discuss their differing past experiences and the possibility of a budding relationship between them. Amy prepares to ask Rachel out but before she can, she gets ominous text messages telling her to go outside. Outside, a woman begins to fight with Amy, claiming her husband is cheating on her with Amy. Amy comes to the conclusion that the woman was Ed's wife.
21	21	"Love is Patient, Love is Kind, Love isn't Married to Someone Else."	5:57	March 5, 2016
After being told about the woman, Dee confronts Ed about his wife, Lauren. Ed claims he tried to break off the marriage after finding Dee but regardless, the two break up. Ed tells Dee that he knew all along that they had true feelings for Rachel.
22	22	"I Don't Know If I Can Keep This Up"	8:16	March 9, 2016
Amy and Rachel discuss the fight outside the bar and how it'll affect Dee. Amy tries to ask Rachel out but puts it off yet again. Dee stumbles back into the apartment after a two day bender with cuts on their face. Rachel helps clean up Dee's face and it comes to light that Rachel has lost her job at the bar. Dee confesses their feelings to Rachel, admits that Ed was right, and they share a kiss. Amy walks in, flowers in hand, ready to ask Rachel out, only to see the pair together.

=== Season 2 (2017) ===
No. overall	No. in series	Title	Running time	Original release date
23	1	"Interview Pt. 2"	5:31	April 29, 2017
The episode starts off with Rachel Mannt and Dee Warson living in a new apartment. Several months have passed since the finale of Season 1 and Amy Warson is still not speaking with her sibling or with Rachel. Rachel is clearly distraught about this, but Dee reassures her that Amy will come around with time. Rachel begins looking for a job. Dee reaches out to their mom Rita to set Rachel up with a job at a flower shop. At first, Rita misgenders Dee but when Rachel corrects her, she switches to using they/them pronouns.
24	2	"A Formal Introduction"	3:53	May 6, 2017
Rachel has begun work at Anita Warson's flower shop. She seems slightly out of her depth in terms of both arranging flowers and dealing with customers. Her new coworker, Cal steps up to save the day.
25	3	"Fairytale Couple Seeking Audience"	4:37	May 13, 2017
Amy creates her own couple's YouTube channel called "Jaime & Amy" with her girlfriend Jaime. Jaime is a mutual friend of both Amy and Rachel's. Like Rachel, Jaime is British and works as a bartender. The two share the story of how they first met. Jaime reveals that Amy brought her flowers. While Jaime is unaware, it is clear that these were the flowers which Amy intended to give to Rachel at the end of Season 1.
26	4	"Chemistry"	4:15	May 20, 2017
Rachel and Dee find Amy's new YouTube channel. Rachel is irritated by this and asks Dee to film a vlog. Rachel starts the vlog by welcoming Jaime & Amy to the internet. She offers multiple pointers to create a successful couple's channel and is clearly throwing shade at the couple under the guise of being enthusiastically nice.
27	5	"Floral History"	5:37	May 27, 2017
Cal and Rachel are working at the flower shop. Amy enters the shop, unaware that Rachel is now working there. The two have a tense conversation. The conversation turns to an argument about their romantic history. After Amy leaves, Cal and Rachel bond over some whiskey in the back of the shop.
28	6	"A Lesson in Perspective"	32:41	June 3, 2017
Cal enters Dee's apartment looking for Rachel. She introduces herself to Dee who is working on a painting. The two have a flirtatious conversation and before she leaves, Cal gives Dee her number.
29	7	"Bottled Up Bygones"	4:21	June 10, 2017
Rachel returns to the apartment annoyed. When Dee asks if she's still up for filming, Rachel responds brusquely in the affirmative. They film a vlog together about making relationships last. Dee grins as they receive a text message. Rachel gets rid of a box of items that remind her of Amy.
30	8	"Jaimyrawfootage"	6:25	June 17, 2017
This episode is a collection of raw, unedited footage of Jaime and Amy filming a Q & A together which was accidentally uploaded to their YouTube channel. They reveal that their viewers have given them the ship name "Jaime with a Y." Amy shuts down any questions that ask about Dee, Rachel, or Ed but in doing so, she reveals that Dee and Rachel are faking their relationship in order to keep Rachel in the country. Filming is interrupted when Jaime is called into work early.
31	9	"Extremely Loud and Incredibly False"	3:09	June 24, 2017
Cal arrives at the flower shop to find Rachel and Amy arguing. Rachel accuses Amy of being desperate and of manipulating people, like Jaime, in order to get attention. After Amy leaves, Cal invites Rachel out for drinks, making a point to invite Dee as well.
32	10	"Bar Brawl"	3:25	July 1, 2017
Rachel coaxes Dee into going out for drinks with her and Cal. The bar is crowded but the two quickly find Cal who renders a starry-eyed Dee speechless. When the trio go up to the bartender to complain about a botched drink order, they run into Jaime and Amy.
33	11	"Mal de Mer"	5:21	July 1, 2017
Cal is ill at ease in the middle of the awkward meeting between Amy, Dee, and Rachel. Jaime is confused by the conflict. Dee is upset that Amy hasn't been speaking to them. Amy accuses Rachel of messing up what they had together. Jaime comes to the realization that she's Amy's rebound and that Amy hasn't been honest with her. Cal reassures Dee that the conflict between Amy and Rachel is not their issue. The two almost share a kiss before they are distracted and return to the ongoing conflict at the bar. Jaime threatens to reveal Rachel's ploy and have her deported. She breaks up with Amy. Dee takes a distraught Amy back to their apartment to spend the night.
34	12	"Siblings Doin' It for Themselves"	5:16	July 8, 2017
Dee and Amy share a heart-to-heart sibling make-up conversation. Dee apologizes for hurting Amy their poor decisions. Cal texts Dee to check in. When Amy asks, Dee shares that they don't want to drag anyone else into their mess. Dee tells Amy that Rachel has been pining over her. Cal shows up with coffee and asks Dee out on a date, kissing them on the cheek before leaving.
35	13	"Good Things Come in Threes"	3:54	July 15, 2017
Amy, Rachel, and Dee film a vlog together. Amy tells the internet that she and Jaime are no longer a couple. The three play a game comparing themselves to notable trios suggested by their followers. They then reveal to their fanbase that Rachel and Dee are now engaged.
36	14	"The Long Exposure"	4:36	July 22, 2017
Rita enters the flower shop while Rachel and Cal are working, visibly excited and flustered having seen Rachel and Dee's video announcing their engagement. While Rita and Rachel are speaking in the back of the store, Dee arrives with a gift for Cal. Dee's mother is happy to see them and despite slipping up, is purposefully making an effort to avoid misgendering Dee. Rachel tells Dee that Rita has seen their most recent channel video to both of their horrors. Rita is eager to begin wedding planning. Before leaving the shop, Cal kisses Dee on the cheek, unaware of the drama.
37	15	"InDeecision"	3:42	July 29, 2017
Cal and Dee are having a conversation about Dee's artwork. Dee reveals that their parents reacted badly to them coming out as non-binary. Despite Rita's recent efforts, Dee doesn't trust that their mom won't change her mind about supporting them. The two continue to flirt and almost kiss but are interrupted by Amy knocking at the door. Despite Amy's repeated knocks, Cal and Dee share a brief but meaningful kiss.
38	16	"One Day, One Night"	8:19	August 5, 2017
Rachel and Dee share a heartfelt conversation. Rachel says she's happy to be part of Dee's family and tells Dee that they don't have to go through with the wedding, which is in a week. Dee reassures Rachel that they're not walking out on her. Dee tells Rachel that she should tell Amy her true feelings. As Dee leaves, they run into Amy working up the courage to come in to see Rachel. Amy and Rachel awkwardly work on wedding preparations. Later in the evening they have a deep, heart-felt conversation. Rachel leans in for a kiss but Amy pulls back. They have a serious conversation about the potential of a relationship. After deciding to try and make it work, they share a tender kiss.
39	17	"In Too Deep with the Lemon Buttercream"	4:56	August 12, 2017
Rita, Amy, Rachel, and Dee are taste-testing wedding cakes at the flower shop after closing. Cal walks in from the utility closet where she's been developing photographs. It's revealed that Rachel and Dee are getting married. While Cal is struggling to figure out how to react, Rita asks her to help Dee find a suit for the wedding. Cal agrees despite clearly being hurt and furious with Dee, Rachel, and Amy.
40	18	"Well-Suited"	3:43	August 19, 2017
Cal helps Dee shop for a wedding suit. The two are awkward with each other. Dee tries to explain the situation to Cal and reassure her that they're not actually in a relationship with Rachel. Cal is confused as to why Dee would choose to marry someone they don't love romantically and becomes upset, arguing that Rachel should choose someone else rather than ruining Dee's life. Dee attempts to kiss Cal but Cal pushes them away in order to finish speaking. After begging Dee not to marry Rachel, Cal and Dee share a desperate kiss.
41	19	"Talking Points"	4:06	August 26, 2017
Rachel and Dee are having a serious conversation at the flower shop. Dee feels horrible for messing everything but Rachel points out that they're the type of person to always try and fix things and help other people. Rachel admits that for a while, around the time they kissed, she had feelings for Dee but has gotten over them. She tells Dee that she's serious about her feelings about Amy. Cal arrives to work and Dee apologizes to her. Cal shuts down any further conversation.
42	20	"Shield and Spear"	4:28	September 2, 2017
Rachel talks to Cal about Dee and their history together. She explains the whole story about the fake relationship and the YouTube channel. Cal is not impressed and tells Rachel that she's quitting her job and leaving town for a while. Rachel begs them to stay for Dee's sake but Cal wants to move on.
43	21	"I Know Who I Am"	8:40	September 9, 2017
It's the day of the rehearsal dinner. Amy and Rachel tell each other "I love you." Dee is trying to find Cal but Cal is aggressively avoiding them. They're ready to give up, but Rachel encourages them to keep trying. Rachel tells Dee that it's okay if they decide to back out. Mr. Warson doesn't show up, much to Rita's dismay and Amy's fury. Rita apologizes to Dee for not accepting their identity when they first came out and says she's proud of them. Amy delivers an emotional toast to Dee and Rachel. Cal storms out angrily and Dee follows. Dee begs Cal to wait out the six months until they can divorce Rachel but Cal says that she can't be dishonest like that. Dee moves forward to kiss Cal but Cal stops them, annoyed. Dee tells Cal that they choose her over Rachel. The two share a soft and tender moment.
44	22	"Something Bold, Something New"	14:25	September 17, 2017
It's the day of the wedding. Dee and Cal are packing to run away together. The two kiss before Cal heads out to play the role of innocent wedding photographer. At the wedding venue, Rachel and Amy excitedly make out before the wedding. Cal runs into Rita who has picked up on her feelings for Dee. Rita asks Cal to stay because she considers Cal to be family. Back at the apartment, Dee decides to attend the wedding instead of running away. They meet Cal in the utility closet at the flower shop and both of them agree that they can't go through with running away. They have to come up with a new plan. At the wedding venue, Rachel sits down with Rita and tells her the truth about everything. Rita asks to talk with Dee. She tells Dee that it's okay to walk away. Dee confesses they've been trying to tell their mom the truth but have been afraid of hurting her or losing their new relationship. Rita tells Dee that they and Cal make a lovely couple. Dee is visibly confused by this and surprised, but relieved, that Rita knows the truth. The wedding begins, with everyone taking a turn filming for the YouTube video. Dee kisses Cal on the cheek. Finally, it's revealed that Rachel is marrying Amy.

== Awards and nominations ==
In 2016, the series was nominated for a Streamy award, ultimately losing to Brooklyn Sound.
