= We Forgot to Break Up (2024 film) =

2024 Canadian drama film

- Film Onesheet
- Directed by: Karen Knox
- Written by: Noel S. Baker; Pat Mills; Zoe Whittall
- Based on: Heidegger Stairwell by Kayt Burgess
- Produced by: Nicole Hilliard-Forde
- Starring: Lane Webber; Daniel Gravelle; June Laporte
- Cinematography: Jordan Kennington
- Edited by: Anna Catley
- Music by: Torquil Campbell
- Production company: Motel Pictures
- Distributed by: Northern Banner Releasing
- Release date: March 17, 2024 (BFI Flare)
- Running time: 94 minutes
- Country: Canada
- Language: English

We Forgot to Break Up is a 2024 Canadian drama film directed by Karen Knox. Adapted from the novel Heidegger Stairwell by Kayt Burgess, the film centres on The New Normals, an indie rock band from a small town led by trans man singer Evan (Lane Webber), who move to Toronto in pursuit of stardom.

The cast also includes Daniel Gravelle, June Laporte, Jordan Dawson, Hallea Jones, Jade Hassouné, Xavier Lopez, Gwenlyn Cumyn, Nicolette Pearse, Keara Graves, Evan Buliung, Janelle Cooper, Nicolas Babin and Joe Drinkwalter.

== Production ==
A short film based on the novel, We Forgot to Break Up, was previously directed by Chandler Levack and released in 2017. The feature film version went into production in 2022 in North Bay, with its screenplay written by Noel S. Baker, Pat Mills and Zoe Whittall.

The film's soundtrack includes several original songs written by Torquil Campbell of the indie rock band Stars, as well as songs by Peaches, Gentleman Reg and The Hidden Cameras.

== Distribution ==
The film premiered on March 17, 2024, at BFI Flare, and had its Canadian premiere in May as the closing gala of the Inside Out Film and Video Festival.

== Critical response ==
Lindsay Clarke of Exclaim! rated the film 8 out of 10, writing that "the place where We Forgot to Break Up shines the most is in its ability to equally represent both the excitement and heartbreak of young adulthood — the pain of breaking up, of pining after someone, of taking what you have for granted. We Forgot to Break Up takes place over the span of a few short years, but by the end, Evan and the rest of the band have learned so much (and yet so little) that it feels like a lifetime of experiences."

== Awards ==
Knox was co-winner of the DGC Award for Best Direction in a Feature Film, alongside Fawzia Mirza for The Queen of My Dreams.
