= Kayt Burgess =

Canadian writer

- Born: Manitouwadge, Ontario, Canada
- Occupation: novelist
- Writing career
- Period: 2010s – present
- Notable work: Heidegger Stairwell

Kayt Burgess is a Canadian writer, who won the Three-Day Novel Contest in 2011 for her debut novel Heidegger Stairwell. Published by Arsenal Pulp Press in 2012, the novel was subsequently a shortlisted nominee for the 2013 ReLit Award in the fiction category. She was also a finalist in the 2012 Three-Day Novel Contest, but did not win, for the not-yet-published novel Fauvel.

Heidegger Stairwell, about a successful Canadian indie rock band on the verge of collapse due to internal tensions, is narrated by a former girlfriend of the band's lead guitarist who has recently come out as a trans man, and was noted for its unconventional narrative technique, including "editorial notes" from various characters disputing and contradicting the version of the story presented by the narrator. The novel was subsequently adapted by music journalist Chandler Levack for the short film We Forgot to Break Up in 2017; and by Karen Knox as the 2024 feature film We Forgot to Break Up.

Burgess has also published short stories in the literary journals The Pinch and Mosaic, and published a standalone short story, "The Soprano", with Found Press in 2013.

Born in Manitouwadge, Ontario and raised in Elliot Lake, Burgess was educated at Humber College, the University of Western Ontario and Bath Spa University. She currently lives in Aurora, Ontario.

== Works ==
- Heidegger Stairwell (2012, ISBN 978-1-55152-486-3)
- The Soprano (2013, ISBN 9781926998350)
- Connection at Newcombe (2021)
