= Thriving: A Dissociated Reverie =

2023 Canadian short film directed by Nicole Bazuin

- Directed by: Nicole Bazuin
- Written by: Nicole Bazuin; Kitoko Mai; Andrea Werhun
- Produced by: Nicole Bazuin; Andrea Werhun
- Starring: Kitoko Mai
- Cinematography: Ashley Iris Gill
- Edited by: Anna Catley
- Production company: Virgin Twins
- Release date: January 21, 2023 (Sundance)
- Running time: 10 minutes
- Country: Canada
- Language: English

Thriving: A Dissociated Reverie is a 2023 Canadian short documentary film, directed by Nicole Bazuin. The film profiles Kitoko Mai, a Black Canadian non-binary artist with dissociative identity disorder.

The film premiered at the 2023 Sundance Film Festival.

The film was named to TIFF's annual Canada's Top Ten list for 2023.
