= The Control =

- Film poster
- Directed by: Mike Stasko; Eric Schiller
- Written by: Mike Stasko; Eric Schiller
- Produced by: Mike Stasko; Eric Schiller; Ted Bezaire
- Starring: Mike Stasko; Eric Schiller; Sharon Belle
- Cinematography: Kyle Archibald
- Edited by: Mike Stasko
- Music by: The Growlers; Bardo Pond; Spirit Oak; Bloemfontein
- Release dates: April 26, 2018 (WorldFest-Houston); May 26, 2020
- Running time: 94 minutes
- Country: Canada
- Language: English

The Control is a 2018 sci-fi mystery thriller film by Mike Stasko and Eric Schiller. The film premiered at the 2018 WorldFest-Houston International Film Festival, where it won the Platinum Remi award.
