= Sharon Belle =

Canadian actress (born 1993)

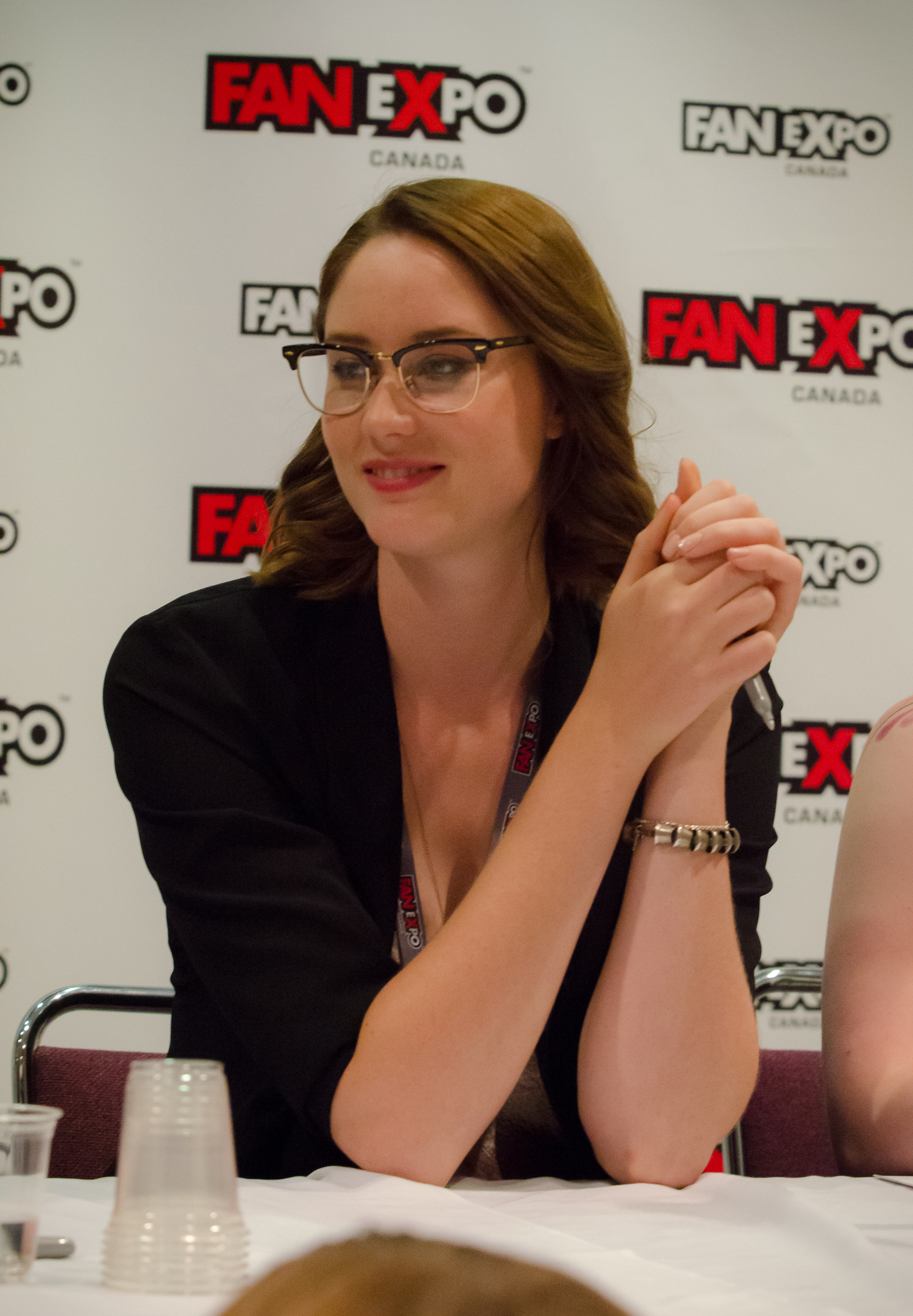
- Belle in 2015
- Born: May 7, 1993 (age 32); Keswick, Ontario, Canada
- Occupation: Actress
- Years active: 2013–present

Sharon Belle (born May 7, 1993) is a Canadian actress, best known for her role in the web series Carmilla and Couple-ish.

== Early life ==
Belle grew up in Keswick, Ontario. She later moved to Toronto and studied Acting on Film and Television at Humber College. After this she appeared in several films and on stage at the Alumnae Theatre and Buddies in Bad Times Theatre.

== Career ==
Belle first gained popularity in 2014 for her portrayal of Danny Lawrence in the web series Carmilla. In 2015, Belle was placed 46th on AfterEllen's Hot 100 List, beating stars like Emma Stone.

In 2016, Belle appeared in the web series Couple-ish. She played Rachel, a queer Londoner who wants to stay in Toronto although her visa has expired.

== Personal life ==
In addition to working as an actor, Belle also plays the guitar. She speaks French and English.

== Filmography ==
Year	Title	Role	Notes
2013	Paranormal Witness	Harpy	TV series, 1 episode
2014–16	Carmilla	Danny Lawrence	Web series, main role
2015	Rhapsody	Samantha	Short film by Samuel Dayomi
2015	Fuck Buddies	Elli	Short film by Nate Wilson
2015	Canadian Star	Herself	Documentary
2015–16	Couple-ish	Rachel Mannt	Web series, 20 episodes
2016	Operation Avalanche	Sharon	Film by Matthew Johnson
2016	The Control	Sophie	Film by Mike Stasko and Eric Schiller
2016	The Bookstore	Susan	Film by Alberto Diamante
2016	The Ghost Is a Lie	Watts	Film
2016	Defective	Saved Suit	Film
2016	Swerve	Elise	Web series, 27 episodes
2017	The Carmilla Movie	Danny Lawrence	Film
2017–present	Swift and Loose	Detective Harley Swift	Animated web series
2017–present	Allie & Lara Make A Horror Movie	Becca Michelle Gellar	Web series
2018–present	Step Sisters	Sharon	Web series, co-writer, co-creator
2021	Jupiter's Legacy	Iron Orchid	Episode: "By Dawn's Early Light"
2022	Wolves	Mother	Film
