= Perrie Voss =

Actress and web series co-creator

Perrie Voss is a Canadian actress, editor and writer, most noted as a co-creator and co-star of the web series Avocado Toast and Stories from My Gay Grandparents.

Born and raised in Toronto, Ontario, Voss first met her collaborator Heidi Lynch in 2015 when they acted together in a production of Peter Colley's play The Ghost Island Light. Lynch had recently come out as bisexual, while Voss was going through the recent announcement that her parents were divorcing, which ultimately formed the initial storyline for Avocado Toast.

Stories from My Gay Grandparents, which premiered in 2024, was created in collaboration with actor Scott Farley.

She has also appeared in the films Adult Adoption and Really Happy Someday, and has had guest roles in the television series Cold Blood, Taken, The Handmaid's Tale, The Boys, Murdoch Mysteries and Strays.

She is a Canadian Screen Award winner for Best Series - Web Program or Series for her series Stories from My Gay Grandparents and a two-time Canadian Screen Award nominee for Best Lead Performance in a Web Program or Series for Avocado Toast, receiving nods at the 9th Canadian Screen Awards in 2021 and at the 11th Canadian Screen Awards in 2023. At the 13th Canadian Screen Awards in 2025, she received nominations for Best Lead Performance in a Web Program or Series and Best Picture Editing in a Web Program or Series for Stories from My Gay Grandparents.
