= Stories from My Gay Grandparents =

Comedy web series from Canada

Stories from My Gay Grandparents is a Canadian comedy web series, which premiered in 2024 on KindaTV. The series stars Scott Farley and Perrie Voss as Mason and Rebecca Michelle Butters, queer siblings whose grandparents Russell (James Kall) and Barbara (Jane Moffatt) both come out as gay or lesbian themselves following a near-death experience, forcing Mason and Rebecca to introduce their grandparents to LGBTQ culture and community.

The cast also includes Alexander Nunez, Tricia Black, Brandon Ash-Mohammed, Jo Vannicola, Kirsten Rasmussen, Geoffrey Pounsett, Jonathan Tan, Antoine Yared, Paloma Nuñez, Colm Sawyer, Diana Leblanc, Aisha Evelyna, Liam Kinahan, Harrison Browne, David Ikeda, Talia Rockland, Nico Lidster and Alison Deon in supporting roles.

It was created by Farley and Voss, and directed by J Stevens.

In advance of its streaming premiere, the series was screened at the 2024 Inside Out Film and Video Festival.

== Awards ==
Award	Date of ceremony	Category	Recipient(s)	Result	Ref.
Canadian Screen Awards	2025	Best Original Program or Series, Fiction	Scott Farley, Perrie Voss, Andrew Nicholas McCann Smith, J Stevens, Ash DeVries	Won	
Canadian Screen Awards	2025	Best Lead Performance in a Web Program or Series	Scott Farley	Nominated	
Canadian Screen Awards	2025	Best Lead Performance in a Web Program or Series	Perrie Voss	Nominated	
Canadian Screen Awards	2025	Best Supporting Performance in a Web Program or Series	Tricia Black	Won	
Canadian Screen Awards	2025	Best Direction in a Web Program or Series	J Stevens	Nominated	
Canadian Screen Awards	2025	Best Picture Editing in a Web Program or Series	Perrie Voss "Dodging Balls"	Nominated	
T.O. Webfest	2024	Best Comedy Web Series		Won	
T.O. Webfest	2024	Best Ensemble in a Web Series		Won	
WGC Screenwriting Awards	2025	Best Writing in a Short Series	Perrie Voss, Scott Farley "Dodging Balls"	Nominated	
