= We Forgot to Break Up (2017 film) =

- Film poster
- Directed by: Chandler Levack
- Written by: Chandler Levack; Steven McCarthy
- Based on: Heidegger Stairwell by Kayt Burgess
- Produced by: Matt Hilliard-Forde; Nicole Hilliard-Forde
- Starring: Jesse Todd; Cara Gee; Grace Glowicki; Steven McCarthy; Mark Rendall
- Cinematography: Cabot McNenly
- Edited by: Bryan Atkinson
- Production companies: Motel Pictures; BravoFACT
- Release date: September 10, 2017 (TIFF)
- Running time: 16 minutes
- Country: Canada
- Language: English

We Forgot to Break Up is a 2017 Canadian short drama film directed by Chandler Levack.

== Background ==
Adapted from the novel Heidegger Stairwell by Kayt Burgess, the film centres on Evan (Jesse Todd), a former rock musician reintroducing himself to his ex-bandmates for the first time since abandoning the band and coming out as a trans man.

== Cast ==
The film's cast also includes Cara Gee, Grace Glowicki, Steven McCarthy, Mark Rendall, Dov Tiefenbach and Sofia Banzhaf.

== Release ==
The film premiered at the 2017 Toronto International Film Festival. It won the award for Best Canadian Short Film at the 2017 Whistler Film Festival.

== Feature film adaptation ==
A feature film adaptation of Burgess's novel, directed by Karen Knox, entered production in 2022, and was released in 2024.
