= Ellie Moon =

Canadian actor, playwright and screenwriter

- Born: 1993 or 1994 (age 32–33); Hong Kong
- Occupations: Actor, playwright, screenwriter
- Years active: 2016–present

Ellie Moon is a Canadian-British actress, playwright and screenwriter.

== Early life ==
Moon grew up in Kingsville, Ontario and attended Kingsville District High School. A dual citizen of the UK and Canada, Moon moved to England to work and study.

== Career ==
Moon acted in theatre in London, including productions at the Bush Theatre and the Tristan Bates Theatre (Off West End). In the mid-2010s she moved to Toronto, where she became a member of the acting company at Soulpepper Theatre Company in 2016–2017.

Moon acted in her playwriting debut, Asking For It, a verbatim theatre play dealing with issues of sexual consent, after the sexual harassment charges made against Jian Ghomeshi, inspired by an experience in Moon's own past, and much of which involved performers reading transcripts of interviews that Moon had conducted with various people about the issues, at Crow's Theatre and Nightwood Theatre in 2017.

Moon performed in theatre performances of A Doll's House, Part 2 at the Segal Centre for Performing Arts, It's a Wonderful Life at Soulpepper Theatre Company and Asking For It at Thousand Islands Playhouse. Moon acted in the 2019 feature film, The Last Porno Show and in the television series Pretty Hard Cases, Murdoch Mysteries, Quantico and The Lost Symbol. Moon narrated the audiobook for Claudia Dey's 2023 novel, Daughter.

Moon wrote What I Call Her, which premiered in 2018 at Crow's Theatre and This Was the World, which was performed in 2020 at Tarragon Theatre.

Moon wrote the screenplay for, and starred in, the 2022 feature film Adult Adoption, which was directed by Karen Knox and premiered at the Glasgow Film Festival in 2022. The film follows Rosy (Moon), an adult former foster child who was never adopted and turns to an online service in search of a parent figure.

Moon was a playwright-in-residence at the Tarragon Theatre for several years.

In 2026, Moon's second feature film as screenwriter and lead, Young Female Playwright, premiered. It played at the Toronto International Film Festival and Cinequest Film & Creativity Festival, where it won the New Visions Award. In 2026, Moon was announced as part of the cast of Everybody Wants to Fuck Me, a comedy-thriller starring Taron Egerton, produced by LuckyChap, which premiered at the Toronto International Film Festival. Also that year, Moon joined the cast of Sarah Polley’s adaption of Sylvia Plath’s The Bell Jar as Dodo Conway, the neighbour of Esther and Mrs. Greenwood, played by Billie Eilish and Carey Muligan.

== Reception ==
Simon Houpt, writing for The Globe and Mail, called Moon's Asking For It a "sly, intelligent piece of documentary theatre".

Martha Schabas, writing for The Globe and Mail, wrote What I Call Her was "something between insufferable and incredible", noting that "The real marvel here might be how good Moon is at getting under our skin. Her writing demands a kind of interpolation. ... [T]he way this intensity manipulates our understanding of the material, not to mention how it plays upon our sympathies, is the mark of some serious art." Carly Maga, writing for the Toronto Star, said that "Moon has something to say, and she's going to say it loud and fast. With some sculpting and restraint, she'll be a force".

Adult Adoption was named a Globe and Mail Critic's Pick and was later featured as one of their “favourite films of 2023".

Rachel Ho, reviewing Young Female Playwright for Exclaim!, wrote that "Moon's talents as a performer and screenwriter have been on display within Canada's indie film scene for a few years now, and her star will only continue to rise as she creates thoughtful and earnest work".

== Bibliography ==
=== Plays ===
- Asking For It, 2017
- What I Call Her, 2018
- This Was the World, 2020
- Essential, 2020

=== Film ===
- Adult Adoption, 2022
- Art Baby, 2024
- Young Female Playwright, 2026

=== Publications ===
- Asking For It and Other Plays: Asking For It and What I Call Her (2020)

== Other ==
Moon created the Secret Shakespeare Series in 2016.
