= Pulse (2025 TV series) =

- Genre: Medical drama
- Created by: Zoe Robyn
- Showrunners: Zoe Robyn; Carlton Cuse
- Starring: Willa Fitzgerald; Colin Woodell; Justina Machado; Jack Bannon; Jessie T. Usher; Daniela Nieves; Chelsea Muirhead; Jessy Yates
- Composer: Torin Borrowdale
- Country of origin: United States
- Original language: English
- No. of seasons: 1
- No. of episodes: 10

Production
- Executive producers: Zoe Robyn; Carlton Cuse; Bradley Gardner; Emma Forman; Michael Klick; Kate Dennis
- Production companies: Letter Zed; Genre Arts; Busy B Entertainment; MGM Television

Original release
- Network: Netflix
- Release: April 3, 2025

Pulse is an American medical drama television series created by Zoe Robyn. It premiered on Netflix on April 3, 2025, as the first Netflix original English-language medical drama. The series received mixed reviews. On July 2, 2025, the series was canceled after one season.

== Synopsis ==
Pulse is a hospital drama series that follows the personal and professional lives of emergency and surgical residents at Maguire Hospital, a level-one trauma center in Miami during the race for the position of Emergency Medicine Chief Resident. It shows the aftermath of a sexual harassment complaint while the city is hit with a hurricane and an influx of patients.

== Cast ==
- Willa Fitzgerald as Danielle "Danny" Simms, a third-year resident in Emergency Medicine at Maguire Hospital in Miami, Harper's older sister. She has deep empathy but can be brash and impulsive. She had a romantic relationship with Xander, however, after a series of circumstances, they broke up, and she reported him to HR for sexual harassment.
- Colin Woodell as Xander Phillips, Chief Resident of Emergency Medicine at Maguire Hospital. He is from one of Miami's most powerful and wealthy medical families with an influential lineage. He had a romantic relationship with Danny, however, after a series of circumstances, they broke up and he was reported to HR by Danny for sexual harassment.
- Jessie T. Usher as Sam Elijah, a third-year Emergency Medicine Resident, Danny's best friend, who is ambitious and competitive
- Justina Machado as Natalia Cruz, Chair of Surgery and Emergency Medicine
- Jack Bannon as Tom Cole, a British Junior Surgical Resident
- Daniela Nieves as Camila Perez, a third-year medical student who is very optimistic, doing her trauma rotation at the hospital
- Chelsea Muirhead as Sophie Chan, a surgical intern, under Tom's training, who is willing to endure anything in her quest to become a surgeon
- Jessy Yates as Harper Simms, a second-year Emergency Medicine resident and Danny's younger sister
- Néstor Carbonell as Ruben Soriano, a senior general surgeon attending who is Tom's mentor and teacher
- Jessica Rothe as Cass Himmelstein, a senior ER nurse, daughter of a golf pro, who is dating Tom
- Arturo Del Puerto as Luis, the ER charge nurse who is beloved by his staff and he is equally protective
- Ash Santos as Nia Washington, an EMT who is injured in the hurricane
- Santiago Segura as Gabriel Moreno, an ER nurse

== Episodes ==
No.	Title	Directed by	Written by	Original release date
1	"Abby"	Kate Dennis	Zoe Robyn	April 3, 2025
2	"Alone Time"	Kate Dennis	Zoe Robyn	April 3, 2025
3	"Power"	Sarah Boyd	Helen Childress	April 3, 2025
4	"Treat ‘Em and Street ‘Em"	Sarah Boyd	Shepard Boucher	April 3, 2025
5	"Nothing Personal"	S. J. Main Muñoz	Johanna Lee	April 3, 2025
6	"Homestead"	S. J. Main Muñoz	Ann Cherkis	April 3, 2025
7	"Choices"	Wendey Stanzler	Joshua Troke	April 3, 2025
8	"Retreat"	Wendey Stanzler	Fran Kuperberg & Zoe Robyn	April 3, 2025
9	"The Last Shift"	Carlton Cuse	Zoe Robyn & Carlton Cuse	April 3, 2025
10	"Kennedy"	Carlton Cuse	Carlton Cuse	April 3, 2025

== Production ==
=== Development ===
In February 2024, it was announced Netflix had given a series order to Pulse created by Zoe Robyn, who would also serve as showrunner and executive producer alongside Carlton Cuse. On July 2, 2025, Netflix canceled the series after one season.

=== Casting ===
Justina Machado was the first recurring cast member announced. In March 2024, it was announced Willa Fitzgerald and Colin Woodell had joined the series as the leads. Later that month it was announced Jack Bannon, Jessie T. Usher, Daniela Nieves, Chelsea Muirhead, and Jessy Yates had been added to the cast.

== Release ==
The series premiered on Netflix on April 3, 2025.

== Reception ==
On the review aggregator website Rotten Tomatoes, Pulse has an approval rating of 48% based on 27 critics' reviews, with an average rating of 5/10. The website's critics consensus reads, "Checking off all the trendy tropes of modern medical dramas with disorganized execution, Pulse has its finger on the genre's zeitgeist but pales in comparison to its contemporaries." Metacritic, which uses a weighted average, assigned a score of 48 out of 100, based on 12 critics, indicating "mixed or average" reviews.

A review in Variety said, "Despite the sound acting, the poorly formatted narrative, an appalling depiction of sexual harassment and a few insufferable characters don’t exactly make for a pleasurable watch". Time criticized the series' "underdeveloped" #MeToo-related storyline.

== Viewership ==
According to data from Showlabs, Pulse ranked seventh on Netflix in the United States during the week of 31 March–6 April 2025.
