= Scott Farley =

Canadian actor

- Born: Brantford, Ontario
- Education: George Brown College, The Second City, The Groundlings
- Occupation: Actor • Screenwriter

Scott Farley is a Canadian actor and screenwriter, best known for his performances as Carlin Caterpillar in the children's television series The Moblees, and Erney in Glowbies.

Born in Brantford, Ontario, and raised in the outlying community of St. George, he began his acting career in high school theatre productions at Paris District High School, and later studied theatre acting at George Brown College.

In 2022 he won a Voice Arts award from the Society of Voice Arts and Sciences for his work on a tourism commercial promoting Montreal's Gay Village. In addition to his voice acting work, he has also appeared in episodes of Baroness von Sketch Show, Schitt's Creek, The Handmaid's Tale and Murdoch Mysteries.

Farley and Perrie Voss co-created and starred in the 2024 comedy web series Stories from My Gay Grandparents, for which Farley received a Canadian Screen Award nomination for Best Lead Performance in a Web Program or Series at the 13th Canadian Screen Awards in 2025.

In 2025 he made a guest appearance as Lucian in the comedy web series Settle Down.
