= K Alexander =

Canadian actor (born 1992)

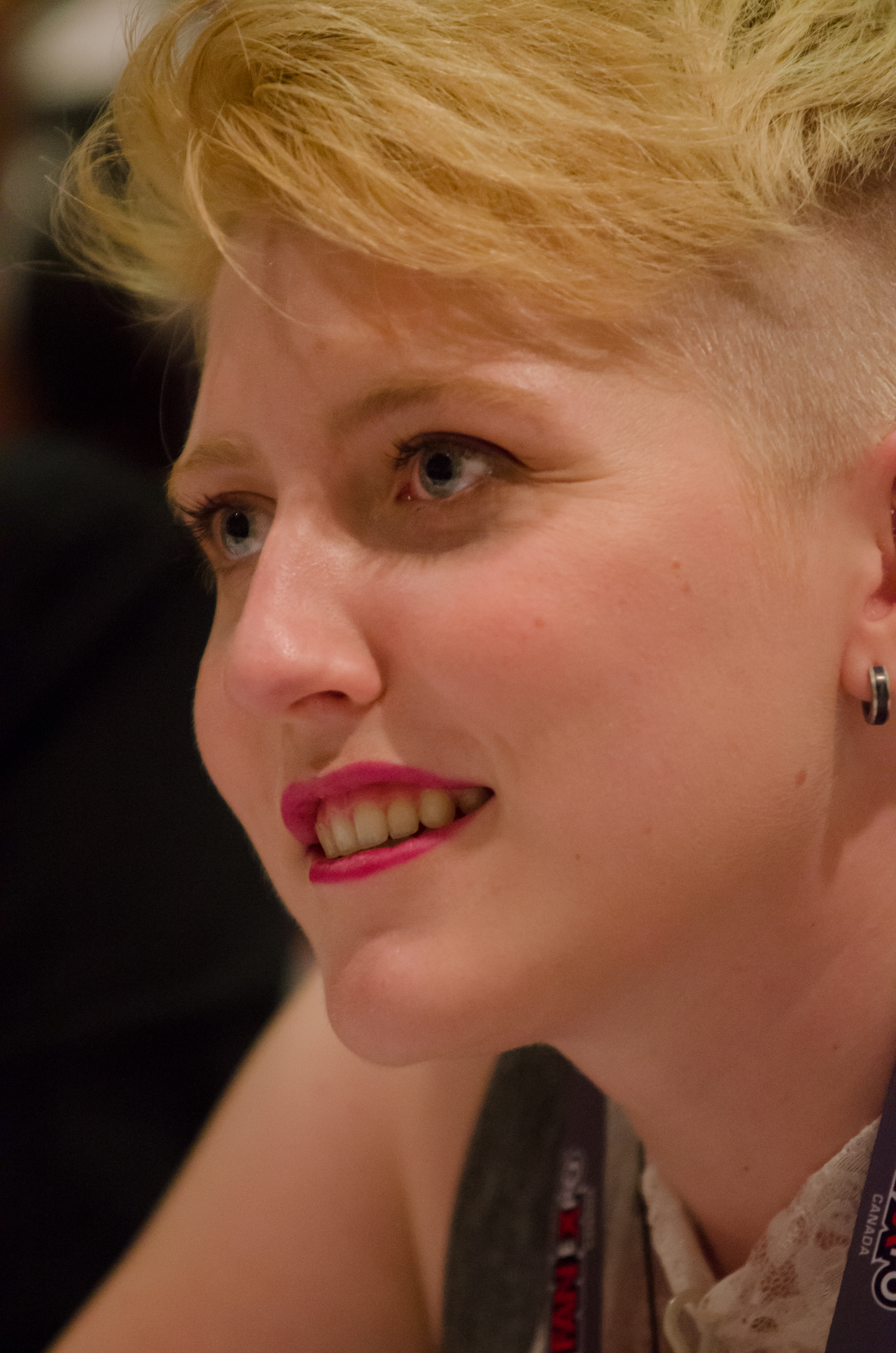
- Alexander in 2015
- Born: October 9, 1992 (age 33); Ottawa, Ontario, Canada
- Education: University of Toronto; Sheridan College
- Occupations: Actor, writer, web series creator, YouTube personality
- Years active: 2014–present

K Alexander (born October 9, 1992) is a Canadian actor, writer, web series creator and YouTube personality, best known as LaFontaine in the popular LGBT web series Carmilla (2014–2016). In 2016, their Kickstarter and Indiegogo-funded web series Couple-ish (2015–2017) was nominated for a Streamy Award.

== Early life ==
Alexander grew up in Ottawa, Ontario. As a child, they were very shy and found that a mandatory acting class led to improved self-confidence.

Alexander attended the University of Toronto Mississauga in conjunction with Sheridan College for Theatre and Drama Studies.

== Career ==
Alexander began a YouTube channel on June 15, 2011. Alexander's videos began to gain traction in 2014, when they became well known for playing LaFontaine in the web series Carmilla. In 2016, Alexander played Max in five episodes of Full Out. In the same year Alexander starred in the music video Melete by Laurence Made Me Cry.

In addition to working as an actor, Alexander is also a musician and a writer and is also the creator of the web series Couple-ish, in which Alexander acts as a main character, writer, producer and theme song singer. Alexander plays the lead role, Dee Warson, who is a non-binary and pansexual artist. The series was funded through a successful Kickstarter campaign, which raised over $29,000 CAD. In 2016, the series was nominated for a Streamy Award in the Best Indie category, but ultimately lost to Brooklyn Sound.

Another successful Indiegogo campaign was launched in November 2016 to fund a second season, with a fixed goal of $45,000 USD. The second season premiered on April 29, 2017.

=== Other work ===
On January 26, 2019, Alexander digitally released a debut EP titled Time Tells, produced by Erik Solarski (aka Soles), the co-writer of the Carmilla theme song "Love Will Have Its Sacrifices".

Alexander was also the co-host of the Orphan Black after-show podcast.

== Personal life ==
Alexander lives in Toronto, Ontario. They are queer and non-binary and use they/them pronouns. Alexander credited LaFontaine, the non-binary Carmilla character whom they played, with helping them to discover and accept their own identity.

== Filmography ==
Year	Title	Role	Notes
2014	Motives & Murders: Cracking the Case	Michelle	TV series, 1 episode
2014–2016	Carmilla	S. LaFontaine	KindaTV Digital Series, Main role
2016	Full Out	Max	TV Mini-Series, 5 episodes
2015–2017	Couple-ish	Deanne 'Dee' Warson	Web series, 44 episodes
2017	The Carmilla Movie	S. LaFontaine	
2019	The Bold Type	Cammy Hartman	TV series, 1 episode
2020	Slo Pitch		Web series
