= Nicole Bazuin =

Canadian photographer and documentary filmmaker

Nicole Bazuin is a Canadian photographer and documentary filmmaker, most noted for her creative collaborations with Andrea Werhun.

The daughter of Dan Bazuin, a former owner of the Toronto independent bookstore This Ain't the Rosedale Library, she began her career as a photographer and director of short films.

She first became widely known for her photographic illustrations in Werhun's book Modern Whore, a memoir of Werhun's time as a sex worker. She then collaborated with Werhun on the short films Modern Whore and Last Night at the Strip Club, which further documented Werhun's sex work.

In 2022, Werhun and Bazuin published an updated edition of the book version of Modern Whore.

In 2023 she directed Thriving: A Dissociated Reverie, a short documentary film about artist Kitoko Mai. The film was named to the Toronto International Film Festival's annual Canada's Top Ten list for 2023.

A full-length feature film expansion of Modern Whore premiered at the 2025 Toronto International Film Festival. In December 2025, Bazuin was named the recipient of the Documentary Organization of Canada's annual Vanguard Award for an emerging talent in Canadian documentary filmmaking.

At the 14th Canadian Screen Awards in 2026, Bazuin won the award for Best Editing in a Documentary, for Modern Whore.
