= Ted Washburn =

American politician

Member of the Montana House of Representatives from the 69th district
- In office January 6, 2009
- Preceded by: Jack Wells

Personal details
- Born: April 9, 1941 White Plains, New York, United States
- Died: September 28, 2019 (aged 78) Bozeman, Montana, United States
- Party: Republican
- Spouse: Claudia Washburn
- Profession: New York Wildlife Conservation Officer
- Website: www.tedwashburn.com

Ted Washburn (born April 9, 1941) is an American Republican politician. He is a member of the Montana Legislature, who serves to the House District 69.
