= Amanda Cordner =

Canadian actor

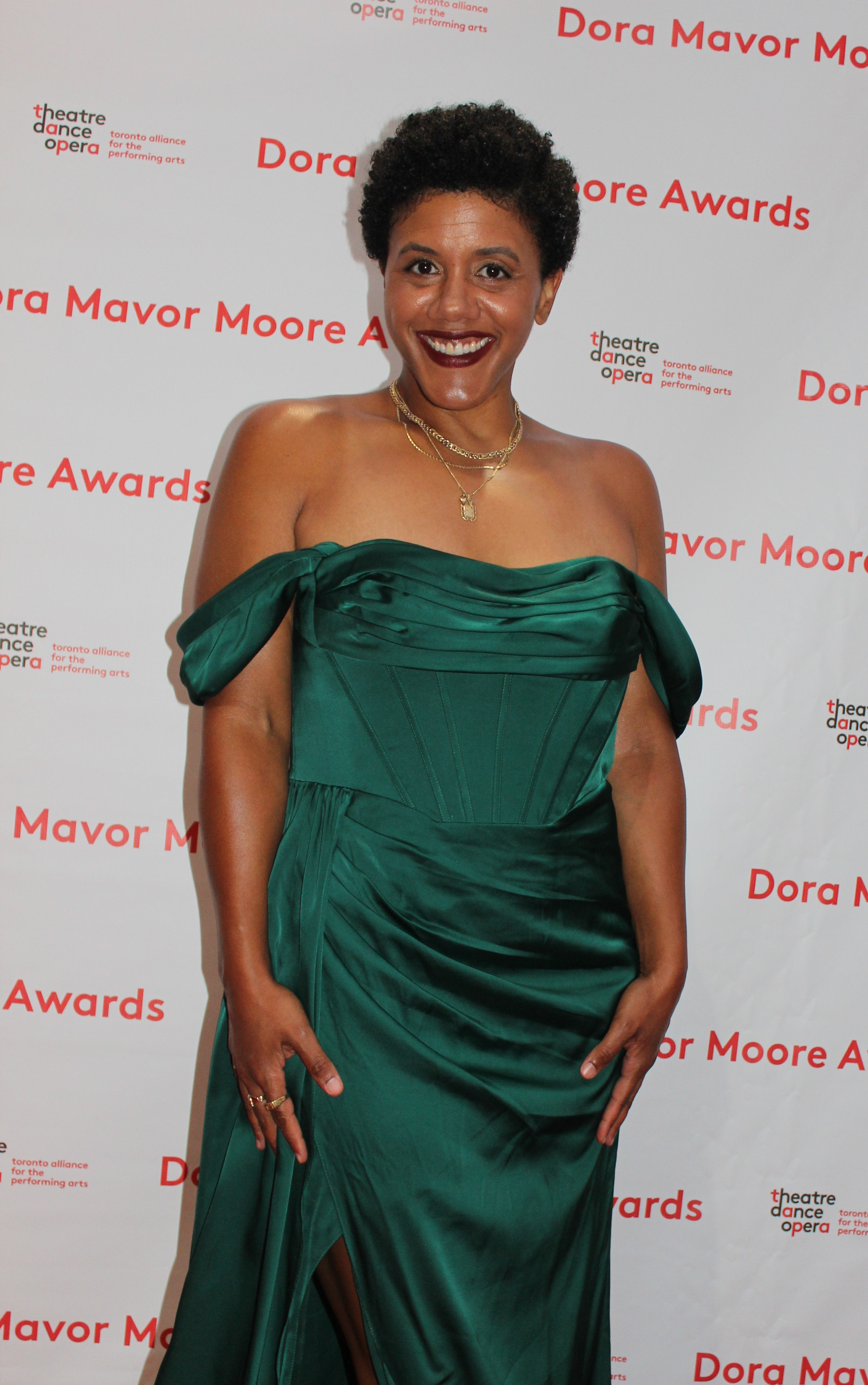
Amanda Cordner, attending the Dora Mavor Moore Awards in 2026

Amanda Cordner is a Canadian actor, most noted for their regular role as 7ven in the television series Sort Of.

Originally from Schomberg, Ontario, Cordner is a graduate of the theatre program at York University. They first became widely known for stage shows, including Body So Fluorescent and Wring the Roses, co-created with David Di Giovanni through the RISER Project.

They have also had supporting or guest roles in Baroness von Sketch Show, TallBoyz, The Expanse and Station Eleven, a starring role in the web series Slo Pitch, and played the lead role in "The Sender", Cheryl Foggo's contribution to the 21 Black Futures project.

They have received two Canadian Screen Award nomination for Best Supporting Performance in a Comedy Series for Sort Of, at the 11th Canadian Screen Awards in 2023 and the 12th Canadian Screen Awards in 2024.

After Body So Fluorescent was published in book form in 2023, it received a nomination for that year's Dayne Ogilvie Prize for LGBT literature.
