= Filiation =

Legal relationship between parent and child

Filiation is the legal term for the recognized legal status of the relationship between family members, or more specifically the legal relationship between parent and child. As described by the Government of Quebec:

Filiation is the relationship which exists between a child and the child’s parents, whether the parents are of the same or the opposite sex. The relationship can be established by blood, by law in certain cases, or by a judgment of adoption. Once filiation has been established, it creates rights and obligations for both the child and the parents, regardless of the circumstances of the child’s birth.

Filiation differs from, but impacts, both parental rights and inheritance.

An example of law regarding filiation is found in the Civil Code of Quebec, Book 2, Title 2 "Filiation", which details how filiation may be established, claimed, and transferred.

== Filiation and adoption ==
When an adoption takes place under the laws of the United States, Canada, New Zealand, Australia, and the United Kingdom, a complete transfer of filiation takes place. A standard example in U.S. adoption law is seen in the California State Code:

8616. After adoption, the adopted child and the adoptive parents shall sustain towards each other the legal relationship of parent and child and have all the rights and are subject to all the duties of that relationship.

In other nations, a form of "incomplete adoption" may allow filiation with the biological family to remain. An example of this is in French law, where two types of adoption exist: adoption plénière, where filiation is completely transferred, and adoption simple in which filiation to the adopting parents is added to, but does not replace, filiation with the biological family.

The legal transfer of filiation is evident in cases where adult adoptees have legally terminated their adoptions, resulting in filiation restored to their biological families. One example of this is the Satnam Parmar Adoption Termination Act (1990) that was passed in the provincial legislature of Alberta, Canada. Parts 2 and 3 of this Act state:

2 Satnam Parmar is hereby declared not to be the lawful child and heir of either Swarn Singh Parmar or Amarjit Parmar, and not to have any rights of inheritance from Swarn Singh Parmar or Amarjit Parmar that might otherwise devolve on him by law.

3 The filial relationship which existed between Satnam Parmar and his natural parents, Balbhadar Singh Parmar and Charan Kaur Parmar, prior to the Adoption Order, is hereby restored.

Another instance involving the legal transfer of filiation in adoption occurs in cases where adult adoptees and their biological families restore their original filiation via adult adoption.

== See also ==
- Fictive kinship
- Paternity (law)
