= Nicole Hilliard-Forde =

Canadian film producer

- Occupations: Casting Director, Producer
- Website: https://www.nicolehilliardforde.com/news

Nicole Hilliard-Forde is a Canadian film producer and casting director. She is most noted for her work on the 2020 film Akilla's Escape, for which she won the Canadian Screen Award for Best Casting in a Film at the 9th Canadian Screen Awards in 2021.

As a producer, her credits include the films The Other Half and We Forgot to Break Up. while her work as a casting director has included Touch of Pink, It's a Boy Girl Thing, Good Dog, Gavin Crawford's Wild West, The Animal Project, What We Have, Antibirth, Creeped Out and Malory Towers.

== Education ==
Hilliard-Forde completed the film program at the Canadian Film Centre in 2006.

== Career ==
Hilliard-Forde is head of the production company Motel Pictures.
