= Gwenlyn Cumyn =

Canadian actor, writer and producer

Gwenlyn Cumyn is a Canadian actor, writer, and producer. Her notable projects include the web television series Barbelle and Slo Pitch.

== Personal life ==
Cumyn lives in Toronto, and is bisexual and queer. Cumyn is a graduate of the George Brown Theatre School.

Cumyn has stated that it was in part due to a lack of quality queer representation that lead to the creation of her web series Barbelle.

== Career ==
As an actor, Cumyn has guest starred in Saving Hope, Paranormal Witness, and Forbidden: Dying for Love. In 2014, Cumyn appeared as Phebe in the Canstage production of As You Like It.

In 2015, she starred as Valentine in the feature film Chasing Valentine. She won the award for Best Actress in a Feature Film at the Milan International Filmmaker Festival for her performance in Chasing Valentine.

As a writer, Cumyn has worked on Barbelle (KindaTV), co-created with Karen Knox, and Slo Pitch, also co-created with Knox and J Stevens, as well the CBC Gem series, Homeschooled. Cumyn co-wrote and starred in the short film Cons & Pros with Knox, which debuted on Vice.com in January 2020.

In 2023, Cumyn was named a resident of the Canadian Film Centre's Acting Conservatory.

== Filmography ==
Year	Title	Role	Notes
2012	Motives & Murders: Cracking the Case	Terri Lynn Matthews/Nanine Grimes	Guest star (2 episodes)
2015	Chasing Valentine	Valentine	Feature film
2015	Paranormal Witness	Kerrie	Guest star
2016	Pure Pwnage	Emma	Feature film
2016	Almost Adults	Jesse	Feature film
2016	The Dwelling/Bed of the Dead	Nancy	Feature film
2016	Forbidden: Dying for Love	Michelle/Amina Said	Guest star (2 episodes)
2017	Saving Hope	Nadine	Guest star
2016–2018	All for One	Dorothy Castlemore	Digital series (ABC Spark)
2017–2019	Barbelle	Alice O'Hara	Digital series (KindaTV)
2020	Cons & Pros	Gwen	Short film (written by)
2020	Slo Pitch	Ann	Digital series (written by)
2022	Adult Adoption	Paula	Feature film
2024	We Forgot to Break Up	Kelly	Feature film
2026	Slo Pitch	Ann	
