= Really Happy Someday =

- Directed by: J Stevens
- Screenplay by: Breton Lalama; J Stevens
- Produced by: J Stevens
- Starring: Breton Lalama; Khadijah Roberts-Abdullah; Xavier Lopez; Ali Garrison; Katharine King So
- Cinematography: J Stevens
- Edited by: Perrie Voss
- Music by: T. Thomason; Joel Waddell
- Production company: Spindle Films
- Release date: September 8, 2024 (TIFF)
- Running time: 90 minutes
- Country: Canada
- Language: English

Really Happy Someday is a Canadian drama film directed by J Stevens, and released in 2024. The film stars Breton Lalama as Z, a trans man musical theatre actor who unexpectedly botches an audition for a role due to the effects of his gender transition on his singing voice, and must work with a vocal coach to retrain himself to sing in his new register.

The cast also includes Khadijah Roberts-Abdullah, Xavier Lopez, Ali Garrison, Katharine King So, Aisha Evelyna, Lauren Beatty, Perrie Voss, Lior Maharjan, Marley Kajan and Paloma Nuñez in supporting roles.

The film premiered in the Discovery program at the 2024 Toronto International Film Festival.

== Critical reception ==
The film received generally positive reviews.

Xtra Magazine's Pat Mullen wrote: "Really Happy Someday offers a striking metaphor for what it means to find one’s voice anew. Stevens creates an authentic portrait of this journey by working in close collaboration with Lalama, who co-wrote the script. The film taps into the vulnerability of baring oneself in a moment of change and self-doubt. In a film with no chance for reshoots, they capture Z’s story as Lalama’s own body evolves with testosterone treatment. In a way, Really Happy Someday is the Boyhood of a trans experience as audiences get to see first-hand how one person’s transition looks and sounds."

Drew Burnett Gregory in Autostraddle wrote: "Lalama’s performance anchors the film and his changing — and powerful — voice feels essential to the film...The soundtrack consists of a wide range of trans musicians with a variety of vocal registers. It’s a lovely touch that underlines the larger point that transness — and medical transition specifically — is not limiting but rather an opportunity to expand and rediscover oneself anew."

== Awards ==
The film was screened in the Borsos Competition program at the 2024 Whistler Film Festival, where it won the awards for best film and best screenplay.

Stevens received a nomination for the DGC Award for Best Direction in a Feature Film.

It won the award for Best Canadian Film at the 2025 Inside Out Film and Video Festival.
