= Slo Pitch =

Canadian web series

- poster
- Genre: Comedy
- Created by: J Stevens; Gwenlyn Cumyn; Karen Knox
- Written by: Gwenlyn Cumyn; Karen Knox
- Starring: Kirsten Rasmussen; Gwenlyn Cumyn; Karen Knox; Lane Webber; K Alexander; Khadijah Roberts-Abdullah; Amanda Cordner; Aisha Evelyna; Chelsea Muirhead
- Country of origin: Canada
- Original language: English

Production
- Executive producers: J Stevens; Gwenlyn Cumyn; Karen Knox; Michael Schram; Scott Garvie; Paige Haight; Christina Jennings

Slo Pitch is a Canadian comedy web series, co-created by J Stevens, Gwenlyn Cumyn, and Karen Knox. The series centres on the Brovaries, an underachieving softball team for LGBTQ women and non-binary players. Despite being perennial losers, most of whom are more concerned with drinking beer and meeting women at after-game parties than they are with the sport, they unexpectedly find themselves in the league championships playing against their arch-rival Toronto Blue Gays.

Slo Pitch features a fully female and/or non-binary led creative team, a key cast that is 50 percent BIPOC, 70% of the cast and crew identifying as female or non-binary, and 80% of key cast identifying as LGBTQ+. The cast includes Kirsten Rasmussen, Gwenlyn Cumyn, Karen Knox, Lane Webber, K Alexander, Khadijah Roberts-Abdullah, Amanda Cordner, Aisha Evelyna, and Chelsea Muirhead.

It premiered August 3, 2020 on OUTtvgo in Canada, and aired on OutTV's linear television channel in 2021. Slo Pitch was picked up by IFC (U.S. TV channel) and aired on their platform October 18, 2021.

Shortly after being picked up by IFC, Season Two premiered in June, 2022.

The series was produced by Shaftesbury Films (Paige Haight) and Boss & Co (Michael Schram, Cumyn, and Knox), with funding from the Independent Production Fund and the Bell Fund.

Co-writers Knox and Cumyn met 12 years ago at George Brown Theatre School where they started collaborating on plays.

The show’s theme song is called "Play the Field", by Partner.

== Plot ==
=== Season 1 ===
The show follows a queer female softball team trying to make it to the championships of their competitive beer league in Toronto, Canada. The mockumentary focuses on an overly invested coach named Joanne, played by Kirsten Rasmussen, and her attempts to take her underdog team The Brovaries all the way to championships. Co-creator J Stevens says they got the idea for the show after playing many team sports, and witnessing the amount of drama that comes from the players.

== Characters ==
- Joanne (played by Kirsten Rasmussen) is the arguably too devoted coach of the Brovaries She's engaged to her longtime girlfriend Sasha, and works as a data analyst.
- Sasha (played by Chelsea Muirhead) is Joanne’s fiance. She is a successful lawyer.
- Boris (played by Karen Knox) is a German immigrant to Canada, and the second best player on the team.
- Ann (played by Gwenlyn Cumyn) plays second base on the Brovaries. She lives in Joanne and Sasha’s basement, and is carrying on an affair with two members of their rival team, The Toronto Blue Gays.
- Lee (played by Lane Webber) is the resident “mischievous” rookie for the Brovaries.
- Mel (played by Amanda Cordner) is the so-called MVP of the Brovaries. A former pro-player, Mel has returned to Toronto and given up her professional softball career.
- Zari (played by Khadijah Roberts-Abdullah) is the only heterosexual member of the Brovaries. In the first season, she tries to “set Boris up with her friend, which turns out to be a huge mess, but she uses a peanut allergy as a means to discuss cultural appropriation.”

== Television series ==
In June 2025, the television series adaptation Slo Pitch for CTV and Crave was announced by Bell Media. The series is from Elliot Page, who executive produces under his company PageBoy Productions. J Stevens, Karen Knox and Gwenlyn Cumyn are the creators, with Katie Ford and Jane Cooper Ford developing the series. In October 2025, it was announced that Emily Hampshire and Jess Salgueiro would lead the cast, alongside the series' creators Knox and Cumyn, Emma Hunter, Chelsea Muirhead, Lane Webber, Khadijah Roberts-Abdullah and Amanda Cordner. The guest cast are led by Ayami Sato, Varun Saranga, Laura de Carteret, Don MacLean Jr., Carolyn Taylor, Chris Locke, Chris Sandiford, and Nadine Bhabha who is also a writer on the series. The series premiered on September 25, 2026.

== Awards ==
The series was nominated for the LGBTQ+ Spirit Award at the 2020 TOWebfest.
