= Chelsea Muirhead =

Canadian actress

- Born: Toronto, Canada
- Occupation: Actress
- Years active: 2010–present

Chelsea Muirhead is a Canadian actress. She is best known for playing Sasha in Slo Pitch, Yanmi in Warrior and Sophie Chan in Pulse.

== Early life ==
Muirhead was born in Toronto, Canada. She developed her love for acting in high school. She attended the Ryerson Theatre School branch of the Toronto Metropolitan University where she trained in acting for four years. Chelsea starred in several plays, such as Regan in Shakespeare's tragedy "King Lear," to more comedic contemporary roles, such as Loretta in George F. Walker's "Featuring Loretta."

== Career ==
Muirhead's first big role came as Sasha in the web series Slo Pitch.

Muirhead was then cast as Yan Mi in the martial arts crime drama Warrior. Her most recent role was as doctor Sophie Chan in the medical drama Pulse.

== Filmography ==
=== Film ===
Year	Title	Role	Notes
2019	Muse Room	Jenny	Short
2020	Kilalanin	Emma Marquez	Short
2020	Spare Parts	Jill	
2020	Somethings Missing	BBQ girl	Short
2020	Lola's Wake	The Aswang	Short
2021	Blackout City	Chelsey	
2022	Adult Adoption	Nola	
2022	Meet Me in New York	Emma	
2022	The Care Giver	Janet	Short
2022	Sappy Holiday	Cherrie	
2023	COLD	Serena	Short
2024	A Chef's Deadly Revenge	Megan	

=== Television ===
Year	Title	Role	Notes
2019	Impulse	Large girl	Episode: "Sofa's choice"
2020-2022	Slo Pitch	Sasha	19 episodes
2023	Warrior	Yan Mi	10 episodes
2024	Law & Order Toronto: Criminal Intent	Rachel Flowers	Episode: "The Sound of Silence"
2025	Pulse	Sophie Chan	10 episodes
