= Adult Adoption (film) =

Canadian independent film

- Directed by: Karen Knox
- Written by: Ellie Moon
- Produced by: Kristina Esposito
- Starring: Ellie Moon; Rebecca Northan; Michael Healey
- Cinematography: J Stevens
- Edited by: Mina Sewell Mancuso
- Music by: Torquil Campbell
- Release date: 2022
- Running time: 90 minutes
- Country: Canada
- Language: English

Adult Adoption is a 2022 independent Canadian feature film. The comedy-drama is Karen Knox's directorial feature debut and the debut screenplay from actor and playwright Ellie Moon, who also plays the lead.

== Plot ==
Adult Adoption follows Rosy (Moon), a 25-year-old bank teller who aged out of the foster care system at 18 and has since managed to build a stable albeit rudimentary and lonely life for herself; she dresses like a very young girl and eats nothing but Kraft Dinner.

Rosy runs out of a restorative yoga class after the instructor tries to reposition her while she is swaddled. A coworker, Helen (Leah Doz), who is very close to her own mother, suggests she try to find an older adult to adopt her.

Rosy reconnects with Nola (Chelsea Muirhead), with whom she lived in a group home, when Nola calls the bank to transfer money to her "new family". The new family's bank account seems to be a business account for a church, and Rosy suspects that it is a cult.

Rosy meets Brian (Michael Healey) through a website that connects younger adults looking for parent figures with older adults looking to adopt young adults, but Brian soon makes it clear he is interested in a dating relationship. She meets Jane (Rebecca Northan), a high school teacher estranged from her own daughter.

After seeing Jane on a "date" with another young woman, Rosy calls Jane, who doesn't pick up and doesn't return the call or emails. Soon after, Rosy learns Nola has been trying to get in touch, and a dangerous-seeming man shows up and pressures her to complete the money transfer to the church. Emotionally overwhelmed, she reaches out to multiple people, including Helen, and reacts to their responses in ways that threaten the relationships.

Rosy rescues Nola from the cult. Jane finally calls and asks Rosy to visit, but when Rosy shows up she finds Jane drunk. During the painful exchange, Rosy realizes Jane's limits as well as her own humanity. She has a normal human interaction with the owner of the coffeeshop in her building, reaches out to Helen to try to start mending the relationship, and returns to yoga class, where she allows the instructor to reposition her.

== Cast ==
- Ellie Moon (Rosy)
- Rebecca Northan (Jane)
- Leah Doz (Helen)
- Michael Healey (Brian)
- Chelsea Muirhead (Nola)
- Craig Lauzon (David)
- Donald MacLean Jr (Dan)

== Production ==
Filming was originally expected to begin March 25, 2020, but was delayed by the COVID-19 pandemic. It was filmed over 17 days on location in March 2021 in Toronto and London, Ontario. London Arts Council provided a grant to help with funding. Run time is 90 minutes.

== Release ==
The film premiered at the 2022 Glasgow Film Festival, and screened at the SOHO International Film Festival, the Whistler Film Festival, Forest City Film Festival, IndieBelgrade Film Festival, Vail Film Festival, Victoria Film Festival, and Atlantic International Film Festival. The film was a finalist for an Emerging Canadian Artist award at the Calgary International Film Festival.

== Reception ==
Tabassum Siddiqui, writing in The Globe & Mail, said that "for all its quirks, at its heart Adult Adoption is a thoughtful coming-of-age story that will have you rooting for its complicated heroine" and designated the film a "Critic's Pick". The paper included it in their list of best films of 2023.

Amber Wilkinson, writing for Screen Daily, said that the film "is scattered with many ... little lessons about connections found in unexpected places without labouring the point and embraces the often unexpectedly warm messiness of real life" and is "a showcase for Moon's onscreen abilities"; however, she thought that the film had perhaps "one plot strand too many" and that Moon's background as a writer for stage showed in the script, which "struggles to make the connecting moments between scenes flow freely", but that once the scene had changed, the script "strikes a good balance between everyday absurdity and underlying emotion".

Chris Knight, writing for the National Post, said that "[w]riter and star Ellie Moon crafts a fascinating story about relationships in all their oddity, messiness and necessity" but that the "plot is ultimately a little thin – the cult, for instance, feels a bit too spot-on Handmaid's Tale, and the resolution of that storyline oddly simple – but there is still much to admire". As of November 2023 the film had a 100% rating on Rotten Tomatoes.
