= Modern Whore =

- Directed by: Nicole Bazuin
- Screenplay by: Nicole Bazuin; Andrea Werhun
- Produced by: Lauren Grant; Nicole Bazuin; Andrea Werhun
- Starring: Andrea Werhun
- Cinematography: Nina Djacic
- Edited by: Nicole Bazuin
- Music by: Tom Third
- Production companies: Clique Pictures; Virgin Twins
- Distributed by: Quiver Distribution
- Release date: September 5, 2025 (TIFF)
- Running time: 80 minutes
- Country: Canada
- Language: English

Modern Whore is a Canadian documentary film, directed by Nicole Bazuin and released in 2025. Adapted from the 2018 memoir of the same name by Andrea Werhun, the film is a portrait of Werhun's time as a sex worker before turning to writing and filmmaking.

== Production ==
Bazuin originally collaborated with Werhun as the photographer for the original book. A short film version of Modern Whore premiered at the SXSW festival in 2020.

In 2024, Sean Baker was announced as executive producer of a feature film version of Modern Whore, after Werhun served as a creative consultant on the production of his 2024 film Anora.

In an essay for CBC Arts's Cutaway column, in which filmmakers talk about their creative process in making the film, Bazuin described the film as an effort to "combine the authenticity of documentary with the immersive storytelling of narrative cinema", and to serve as a manifesto for the rights and humanity of sex workers, "Playboy if it were run by the bunnies".

== Distribution ==
The film premiered on September 5, 2025, at the 2025 Toronto International Film Festival.

== Awards ==
Modern Whore won two major awards at the 14th Canadian Screen Awards in 2026 for Best Editing in a Documentary (Bazuin) and Best Original Music in a Documentary (Tom Third).
