= Andrea Werhun =

Canadian writer and actress (born 1989)

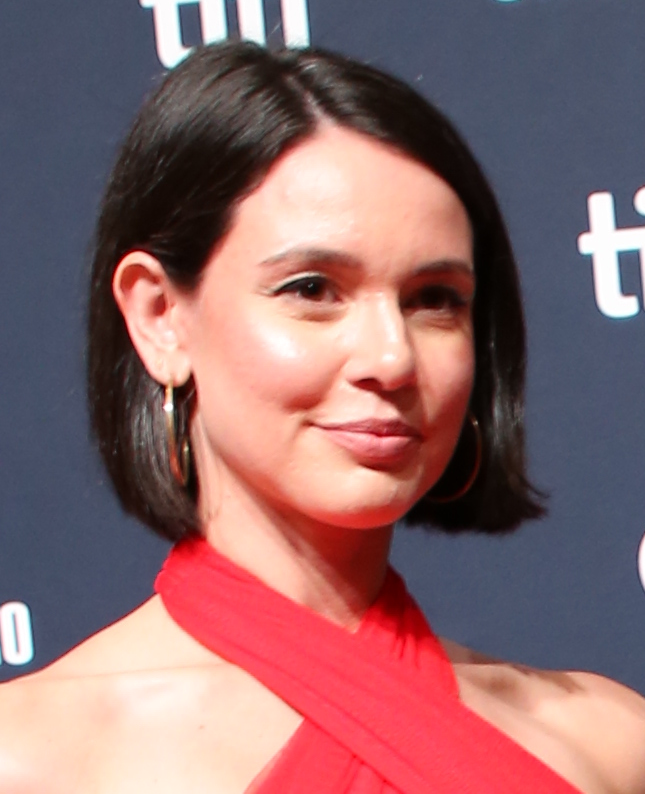
- Werhun in 2024
- Born: November 10, 1989 (age 36)
- Education: University of Toronto (BA)
- Notable work: Modern Whore
- Website: andreawerhun.com

Andrea Werhun is a Canadian writer and actress. She is most noted for her 2018 book Modern Whore, a memoir of her time as a sex worker prior to establishing herself as a creative professional. She studied at University of Toronto, majoring in English and minoring in religious studies.

Werhun worked as an escort and as an erotic dancer. After leaving that line of work she wrote and published Modern Whore, but remained active as an outreach worker helping to educate active sex workers on issues such as safer sex and protecting themselves from violent clients.

== Career ==
=== Sex work and Modern Whore ===
Werhun began working as a escort for an agency in 2011 at the age of twenty-one. In 2013 she retired from escorting.

Following her retirement, she moved with her boyfriend to St. Agatha, Ontario to work on an organic farm for two years. Following her two years in St. Agatha, she worked as a high school science tutor for the Cree Nation of Eastmain. After she returned to Toronto where she lived in her mom's home while briefly working as a production assistant in film and television.

Originally, Werhun and collaborator Nicole Bazuin agreed to call Modern Whore a "creative non-memoir" for the sake of not publicly outting Werhun as a sex worker. At book readings, Werhun would refer to the events as being possibly true without confirming their veracity. She slowly began coming-out as a former sex worker to people in her life. In 2016, she appeared in the CBC documentary Sugar Sisters in which she chose to be identified as an author and former call girl. Prior to the documentary airing, she came out publicly on Facebook.

In March 2017, she started working as a stripper at the age of twenty-seven. In September of that year, she quit to self-publish Modern Whore. Seven months after publishing the book, she returned to stripping as sales of the book had failed to turn a profit. While working as a stripper, Werhun started doing outreach work with Maggie's: The Toronto Sex Workers Action Project, where she worked to provide safe sex and drug kits for street workers.

In March 2020, due to the ongoing COVID-19 pandemic, the strip club Werhun worked at closed. Following the closure, Werhun moved to online sex work, where she created her business called "Hire-A-Muse". Her services offered included creative writing collaboration, reading novels to clients, and filming nude videos.

=== Film work ===
After publishing Modern Whore, she appeared in a short documentary film adaptation of the book, directed by Nicole Bazuin. An expanded edition of the book was published by Penguin Random House Canada in 2022.

In 2023, she was a producer of Bazuin's short film Thriving: A Dissociated Reverie.

In 2024, she served as a creative consultant on Sean Baker's film Anora, and had an acting role in Sook-Yin Lee's film Paying for It.

A feature film version of the documentary, directed by Bazuin and executive produced by Baker, entered production in 2024, and premiered at the 2025 Toronto International Film Festival.

== Personal life ==
Werhun identifies as polyamorous.

In 2019, Werhun sustained a concussion after a bicycle accident. She was scheduled to shoot the short film version of Modern Whore a month after the accident, but postponed her involvement until she had recovered. During that time she abstained from alcohol. She later saw a neurologist to discuss her concussion and ongoing seizures, where she was diagnosed with epilepsy. Following her doctor's advice, she quit drinking.

== Publications ==
In addition to Werhun's book, she has also co-written a journal article.

=== Books ===
- Werhun, Andrea (2022). Modern Whore: a Memoir. Photography by Nicole Bazuin. Toronto: Strange Light. ISBN 9780771098413.

=== Journal Articles ===
- Spring, Lauren; Wunderlee, Alice; Werhun, Andrea (Nov 2019). "Sex Workers as 'Concrete Others': Possibilities and Perils". Canadian Journal for the Study of Adult Education. 31 (2). ISSN 1925-993X.

== Bibliography ==
- Werhun, Andrea (2022). Modern Whore: a Memoir. Photography by Nicole Bazuin. Toronto: Strange Light. ISBN 9780771098413.
