= Karen Knox =

Canadian actor, writer, director, and producer

- Education: LAMDA
- Notable work: The Year of Staring at Noses, Adult Adoption, We Forgot to Break Up, Slo Pitch, Homeschooled

Karen Knox is a Canadian director, actor, and writer. She is the show runner of Slo Pitch, and Homeschooled on CBC, which she wrote, directed, and starred in. She received the DGC award for Outstanding Directorial Achievement for her sophomore feature film We Forgot to Break Up which was also nominated for two Canadian Screen Awards. She is a CSA nominated actress for her work on Wynonna Earp. Her directorial feature film debut, Adult Adoption, premiered at the 2022 Glasgow Film Festival prior to its theatrical release in North America with Level Film. Knox's notable roles include Mina in the Wynonna Earp reboot Vengeance, Ginger in Paramount's All I Didn't Want opposite Academy Award nominee Gabourey Sidibe, Holly Frost in Syfy's Letters to Satan Claus, Veronica Vale in KindaTV's Barbelle, and Boris in IFC (American TV channel) Slo Pitch.

== Early life ==
Karen Knox was born and raised in Orangeville, Ontario. She later moved to Toronto to pursue a career in acting. Knox is a graduate of the London Academy of Music and Dramatic Art.

== Career ==
Knox was the show runner for KindaTV's Barbelle, IFC's Slo Pitch, and CBC's Homeschooled, which she also wrote, directed, and appeared in.

Knox's feature film directorial debut Adult Adoption (written by and starring Ellie Moon) completed production in early 2021 and was acquired for distribution by levelFILM. The film had its premiere at the Glasgow Film Festival in 2022, where it received positive reviews.

In November 2022, Knox entered production on her second feature film We Forgot to Break Up, an adaptation of Kayt Burgess's novel Heidegger Stairwell which was previously adapted as a short film by Chandler Levack in 2017. The film premiered at BFI Flare in 2024.

Knox has written and directed several shorts with her company Boss & Co which have toured to festivals around the world, including Borderline which premiered at Dances With Films in 2022, and Case of the Massey Bodice Ripping which screened at the Canadian Film Festival in 2019. Knox co-wrote and starred in the short film Cons & Pros, alongside Gwenlyn Cumyn, which debuted on Vice in January 2020.

Knox's short film, The Year of Staring at Noses, which she co-directed alongside Matt Eastman, made its world premiere at the 2024 Slamdance film festival.

As an actor, Knox has had roles in Frankie Drake Mysteries, Save Me, Slo Pitch, and Murdoch Mysteries. Knox voices the character Shaid in Ubisoft's Starlink: Battle for Atlas. In 2015, Knox appeared in the world premiere of the John Patrick Shanley play, A Woman is a Secret.

She was co-winner, with Fawzia Mirza for The Queen of My Dreams, of the DGC Award for Best Direction in a Feature Film for We Forgot to Break Up.

== Filmography ==
Year	Title	Role	Notes	Additional Notes
2015	Murdoch Mysteries	Helen Conroy	Series	Episode: Toronto's Girl Problem
2017	That's My DJ	Becky	Series	Episode: Sam
2017	Case of The Massey Bodice Ripping	Director	Short film	
2018	The Fates	Clotho	Short film	Writer Credits
2018	Damage Control	Anna	Short film	Writer/Producer Credits
2019	Barbelle	Veronica Vale/19 Episodes	Series	Writer/Executive Producer Credits
2019	Save Me	Sparkle	Guest star	Episode: First Call
2020	Cons & Pros	Karen	Short film	Executive Producer/Writer Credits
2020	Slo Pitch	Boris/20 Episodes	Series	Executive Producer/Writer Credits
2020	Letters to Satan Claus	Holly Frost	Film	
2021	Frankie Drake Mysteries	Max Lister	Series	Episode: Life Is a Cabaret
	Borderline	Maggie	Short film	Director/Writer Credits
2022	Homeschooled	Ms. D/4 Episodes	Series	Director Credits
2022	All I Didn’t Want for Christmas	Ginger	Film	
2022	Adult Adoption	Director	Feature film	
2023	Slasher	Dominatrix	Series	Episode: The Painful Truth
2024	The Year of Staring at Noses	Samantha	Short film	Director/Writer Credits
2024	The Comics	Director	Short film	
2024	We Forgot to Break Up	Director	Feature film	
2024	Twin Lies	Director	Feature film	
2024	Wynonna Earp: Vengeance	Mina Starratt	Feature film	
2026	Slo Pitch	Boris		

== Video Games ==
Year	Title	Role	Notes
2015	Assassin's Creed: Syndicate	Additional Voices	Video Game
2016	Watch Dogs 2	Melanie	Video Game
2018	Starlink: Battle for Atlas	Shaid	Video Game
2018	Far Cry 5	Various	Video Game
2021	The Vale: Shadow of the Crown	Alex	Video Game
2023	Assassin's Creed Nexus VR	Additional Voices	Video Game
2023	Return to Grace	Adamari "Adie" Ito	Video Game
