= Goodbye in the Mirror =

- Still from Goodbye in the Mirror
- Directed by: Storm de Hirsch; Louis Brigante
- Written by: Storm de Hirsch
- Produced by: Storm de Hirsch
- Starring: Rosa Pradell; Franco Volpino; Diane Stainton; Barbara Apostal; Charlotte Bradley; Frederico Brook
- Cinematography: Giorgio Turi
- Edited by: Storm de Hirsch; Louis Brigante
- Music by: Pola Chapelle; Norman Blagman; Jeffrey Menkes; Steward Robb
- Distributed by: Bobina Productions; Film-Makers' Cooperative
- Release dates: 1964; May 27, 1965 (NY)
- Running time: 80 minutes
- Country: United States
- Language: English
- Budget: $20,000

Goodbye in the Mirror is a 1964 black-and-white experimental film produced and directed by Storm de Hirsch.

== Summary ==
Goodbye in the Mirror is de Hirsch's only feature-length film. It centers on the lives of three young women living in Rome who engage in a series of volatile relationships.

Maria, an American, shares an apartment with Berenice, an aspiring actress from England, and Ingrid, a Swedish singer. Maria becomes romantically involved with Marco, an Italian, who tries to show her what life is really like for his people. Maria continues to see other men. She becomes jealous of Berenice and Ingrid and evicts them from her apartment. Another American, Sarah, briefly stays with Maria; the two women develop an affection for one another, but Sarah suffers from homesickness and returns to America. One night Marco catches Maria with another man; he slaps her and tells her he had been planning to propose to her. They make up, but then Maria thoughtlessly asks him how they should travel to America together. Offended, Marco tells her she must remain in Italy if she is to be his wife. She finds herself unable to give him the answer he wants, so he leaves her.

According to de Hirsch, the film is about the girls' "restlessness and personal involvements in assuming the role of woman as hunter."

== Production ==
Part scripted and part improvised, the film was loosely based on a poem written by de Hirsch and on her own experiences. It was shot on location in Rome using a hand-held 16mm camera, and post-dubbed; the technical quality is crude. Aural masking effects are occasionally used as a counterpoint to the visuals. The total cost of production was $20,000.

It is available for rental from the Film-makers' Cooperative in 16mm format.

== Cast and crew ==
Cast:

- Rosa Pradell as Maria
- Franco Volpino as Marco
- Diane Stainton as Berenice
- Barbara Apostal as Ingrid
- Charlotte Bradley as Sarah
- Federico Brook as Federico

Also:

- Carlo De Sanctis
- Franco Morano
- Giovanni Calluci
- Aldo Bontempo
- Angela Starone
- Gino Pirelli

Crew:

- Harlan Frost, sound technician
- Nathan Malkin, technical assistant

De Hirsch's husband, Louis Brigante, served as associate director.

== Release ==
The film debuted at the Cannes Film Festival in Spring 1964. It was screened at the Locarno International Film Festival in Switzerland that summer, and at the Vancouver International Film Festival in 1966. Its first screening in the U.S. was in New York City on May 27, 1965. Originally released in 16mm, it was later converted to 35mm.

== Reception ==
Response to Goodbye in the Mirror has been mixed. It was criticized as uneven and overlong in a Variety review, and is characterized as "disappointing" in de Hirsch's biography by Cecile Starr. By contrast, Jonas Mekas said after seeing the film, "I couldn't believe what beauty struck my eyes, what sensuousness," and Gregory Markopoulos was impressed with its "visual wisdom." Wheeler Winston Dixon called the film "superb" in his profile of de Hirsch, and in a later article, wrote, "This transcendent and ambitious narrative film is only one example of early Feminist cinema that led to the later work of Yvonne Rainer, Jane Campion, Sally Potter, Julie Dash and others." Gwendolyn Audrey Foster called it "mesmerizing" and "a visual feast of experimentation" in her book on women film directors, and compared its visual effects to those of MTV.

In a discussion with de Hirsch on gender and art, Shirley Clarke called Goodbye in the Mirror the first "real woman's film" and noted:

In other words, for some reason, even so far, women film-makers have yet to deal with the subject of women. That usually, for instance, Varda's heroes are men. Her women may or may not be what brings them to their salvation, or whatever. In Zetterling's film, the women may be the enemy or the devil or the one who gets everything going. But so far in film, we have yet to have treated on the most basic level, very personal reactions of women. Because so far, we've had mostly men directors who, whether they've been very sensitive or not, have not really been able to deal with women this way. Just like when they write about women, they're writing from a certain separateness. Goodbye in the Mirror is dealing with women. And women's reactions to a series of events.

== See also ==
- List of American films of 1964
