= Whale Rock Light =

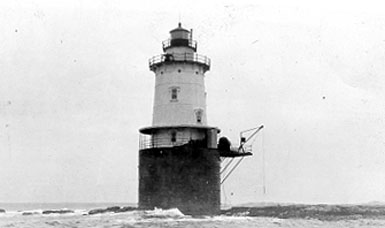
- Location: Whale Rock, Washington County, Rhode Island, United States
- Coordinates: 41°26′N 71°25′W

Tower
- Constructed: 1882
- Construction: bedrock (foundation), cast iron (tower)
- Shape: conical
- Markings: White (tower), black (lantern)

Light
- First lit: 1882
- Deactivated: 1938
- Lens: fourth order Fresnel lens

Whale Rock Light was a sparkplug lighthouse marking Whale Rock, a dangerous island in the entrance to the West Passage of Narragansett Bay in Washington County, Rhode Island.

The rock is now marked by Whale Rock Lighted Gong Buoy 3.

== History ==
The lighthouse was built on the rock in 1882.

It was destroyed in the New England hurricane of 1938 when it was dislodged from its foundation, killing keeper Walter Eberle.

Part of the lighthouse foundation remains and the remains of the lighthouse are underwater nearby.
