= Roger Sandall =

Australian anthropologist, essayist, cinematographer, and scholar

- Born: Frederick Roger Sandall; 18 December 1933; Christchurch, New Zealand
- Died: 11 August 2012 (aged 78); Australia
- Education: University of Auckland (BA); Columbia University (MFA)
- Writing career
- Subject: Anthropology
- Website: www.rogersandall.com

Frederick Roger Sandall (18 December 1933 – 11 August 2012) was a New Zealand-born Australian anthropologist, essayist, cinematographer, and scholar. He was a critic of romantic primitivism, which he called designer tribalism, and argued that this rooted Indigenous people in tradition and discouraged them to assimilate to Western culture.

== Early life ==
Sandall was born in Christchurch, New Zealand on 18 December 1933 and attended Takapuna Grammar School. He studied anthropology at University of Auckland (BA, 1956) and received his MFA (1962) from Columbia University. Among his teachers were Margaret Mead and Cecile Starr. He filmed Maíz as partial fulfilment of his MFA at Columbia in 1962. In 1965, he accepted a fellowship in anthropology at Columbia.

== Career ==
Sandall was finishing a librarianship course and taking photographs of the protests at Berkeley when MOMA's Willard Van Dyke recommended him to the Australian Institute of Aboriginal Studies (AIAS) as a "one-man film unit." Between 1966 and 1973, Sandall made a number of documentaries, oftentimes featuring sacred rituals that were shown only to small audiences in an effort to respect the privacy of these events. Despite this, he won the first prize for documentary at the Venice Film Festival in 1968 for his film Emu Ritual at Ruguri.

After leaving AIAS in the early 1970s, Sandall became a political activist for the rights of Indigenous Australians. In 1973, Sandall joined the anthropology department at the University of Sydney as a lecturer. He wrote for a number of journals including The American Interest, Art International, Commentary, The New Criterion, Merkur, Encounter, and Quadrant. He replaced Peter Coleman as the editor of Quadrant from March 1988 to January 1989, after which he quit due to a public political clash and difficulty in drumming up interest among writers. He retired from teaching in 1993. In 2001, he published The Culture Cult with an American firm after comments he had made at a conference years prior were "grossly distorted in a[n Australian] newspaper report." In 2003, the book won him a Centenary Medal.

Sandall was a strong critic of romantic primitivism. He coined the term designer tribalism to criticise Western anthropologists' perpetuation of the noble savage archetype and the "Disneyfication" of Indigenous people's relationship with nature by "forcing" them to continue practicing their ancestral traditions. He specifically criticises the Māori people for hunting practices that caused the extinction of the moa bird, which he felt was proof that these rituals were being maintained for Western tourism. He named Margaret Mead, Ruth Benedict, Robert Owen, and John Humphrey Noyes as part of the "culture cult" that kept designer tribalism alive. A quote from The Culture Cult reads: "If your traditional way of life has no alphabet, no writing, no books, and no libraries, and yet you are continually told that you have a culture which is 'rich', 'complex', and 'sophisticated', how can you realistically see your place in the scheme of things? If all such hyperbole were true, who would need books or writing? Why not hang up a 'Gone Fishing' sign and head for the beach?" He also felt that "repression, economic backwardness, endemic disease, religious fanaticism, and severe artistic constraints" were inherent within primitive Indigenous cultures. He believed that the White Australia policy and similar legislations improved the wellbeing of Indigenous Australians and supported cultural assimilation into what he called "modern civilisation".

== Personal life ==
Sandall was married to Bay Books publisher Philippa; they had two children, Richard and Emma. He died on 11 August 2012 in Australia.

== Bibliography ==
=== Books ===
- The culture cult : designer tribalism and other essays. Westview Press. 2001.

=== Essays ===
- "When I Hear the Word ‘Culture’: From Arnold to Anthropology" (1980), Encounter, 325, 84-92.
- "The Rise of the Anthropologue" (1986), Encounter, 70 (12): 66-71.
- "Kenneth James Maddock, 1937-2003". Quadrant. 47 (7–8 [398]): 56–57. July–August 2003.
- "Nihilism in the Middle East" (2004), Commentary, 118 (5): 38-44.
- "What Native Peoples Deserve" (2005), Commentary, 119 (5): 54-59.
- "The Culture Cult Revisited" (2008), Social Science and Modern Society, 45 (3): 233-238.

== Filmography ==
- Maíz (1962)
- Walbiri Ritual at Ngama (1966)
- Djungguan at Yirrkala (1966)
- The Mulga Seed Ceremony (1967)
- Emu Ritual at Ruguri (1967)
- Gunabibi: An Aboriginal Fertility Cult (1968)
- Walbiri Ritual at Gunadjarai (1969)
- Camels and the Pitjantjara (1969)
- Making a Bark Canoe (1969)
- Pintubi Revisit Yumari (1970)
- Pintubi Revisit Yaru-Yaru (1972)
- What You Thinkin' About, Little Horse? (1972)
- Coniston Munster: Scenes from a Stockman's Life (1972)
- Larwari and Walkara (1976)
- Weddings (1976)
- A Walbiri Fire Ceremony - Ngatjakula (1977)
- The Tragada Bhavai: A Rural Theater Troupe of Gujarat
- A Zenana Scenes and Recollections (1982)
- Nomads (1984)
- The Bharvad Predicament (1987)
- Close Encounters of No Kind (2002)
