= Storm de Hirsch =

American poet and film director (1912–2000)

- Born: Lillian Malkin; December 9, 1912; New Jersey, U.S.
- Died: 2000 (aged 87–88); New York City, U.S.
- Occupations: poet, filmmaker
- Notable work: Goodbye in the Mirror (1964); Divinations (1964); Peyote Queen (1965); The Tattooed Man (1969)

Storm de Hirsch (1912–2000) was an American poet and filmmaker. She was a key figure in the New York avant-garde film scene of the 1960s, and one of the founding members of the Film-Makers' Cooperative. Although often overlooked by historians, in recent years she has been recognized as a pioneer of underground cinema.

== Biography ==
Born Lillian Malkin in New Jersey in 1912, (Note: Different sources list different birth years for de Hirsch. The Foster book lists it as 1931. The biography by Cecile Starr in the St. James Women Filmmakers Encyclopedia (reprinted on FilmDirectorsSite.com) lists it as December 9, 1912.) Storm de Hirsch left home at an early age to pursue a career in the arts in New York City. There she married her first husband, an artist named de Hirsch. She later married Louis Brigante, a filmmaker and one of the early editors of Film Culture magazine. The marriage lasted until Brigante's death in 1975.

Like many experimental filmmakers at the time, de Hirsch did not begin her artistic career as a filmmaker; she was a poet who had published at least two collections by 1965. She turned to filmmaking because she wanted to find a new mode of expression for her thoughts that went beyond words on the page. In 1962 she made her first film and soon became active in the New York underground film movement, associating with filmmakers such as Stan Brakhage, Jonas Mekas, Shirley Clarke and others. In an interview with Jonas Mekas she mentioned Jack Smith, Ingmar Bergman, Gregory Markopoulos, Michelangelo Antonioni, Vittorio De Seta, Ken Jacobs, Federico Fellini and Jonas and Adolphus Mekas as her favorite filmmakers.

In addition to making films, de Hirsch taught at Bard College and New York's School of Visual Arts. After her husband's death she was forced to give up her studio, and stopped making films. She died in a Manhattan nursing home in 2000, following a long battle with Alzheimer's disease.

== Work ==
Much of de Hirsch's work is abstract and employs experimental techniques such as frame-by-frame etching and painting and metadiagetic editing. In an interview with Jonas Mekas on the making of Divinations she said,

"I wanted badly to make an animated short and had no camera available. I did have some old, unused film stock and several rolls of 16mm sound tape. So I used that — plus a variety of discarded surgical instruments and the sharp edge of a screwdriver — by cutting, etching, and painting directly on both film and [sound] tape."

Sometimes her animations are superimposed over live-action footage. Her films are clearly influenced by her poetic background; she referred to her series of short, silent films shot in the 1970s as "Cine-Sonnets," and she continued publishing poetry throughout her life. Her films also reveal an interest in eastern religious practices and rituals. Her work explores the possibilities of light and is concerned with spatial elements. In one film, Third Eye Butterfly, she used a two-screen projection with split-screen frames to create a kaleidoscopic effect.

Not all of de Hirsch's films are cheaply made animated shorts. One of her early films, Goodbye in the Mirror (1964), is a feature-length live-action film shot on location in Rome, with her husband, Louis Brigante, serving as assistant director. Part scripted, part improvised, the film centers on three young women living in Rome, searching for meaning in their lives. The film was shot on 16mm and later blown up to 35mm, at a cost of around $20,000.

Her films have been screened at the Museum of Modern Art, the Whitney Museum of American Art, the Cannes Film Festival, the Ann Arbor Film Festival, and elsewhere. They are available through the Canyon Cinema Cooperative and the Film-Makers' Cooperative.

=== Influence ===
According to the Museum of Computer Art as of 2014, de Hirsch's work "influences and anticipates the work of many later and current video artists." Her use of technical devices such as painting and etching directly on the film stock has been called pioneering, although those techniques had been used before by Len Lye, Stan Brakhage, and others. Tools and techniques aside, critics have characterized other aspects of her work as inventive or groundbreaking. Stan Vanderbeek called The Tattooed Man "a major work in terms of style, structure, graphic invention, image manipulation and symbolic ritual." Gwendolyn Foster cites Journey Around a Zero (1963) for its unusual treatment of male nudity, which reverses the cinematic tradition in which male filmmakers objectify the female body. Shirley Clarke, noting that Goodbye in the Mirror focuses on female characters and their reactions to a series of events, called it the first "real woman's film"; Wheeler Winston Dixon cites it as an "example of early Feminist cinema that led to the later work of Yvonne Rainer, Jane Campion, Sally Potter, Julie Dash and others."

=== Filmography ===
- Silently, Bearing Totem of a Bird (1962) 6:45 minutes, S8mm
- A Reticule of Love (1963) 3 1/2 minutes, B/W, S8mm
- Journey Around a Zero (1963) 3 minutes, 16mm
- Goodbye in the Mirror (1964) 80 minutes, B/W, 16mm or 35mm
- The Color of Ritual, the Color of Thought (trilogy) (1964-1966)

- Divinations (1964) 5 1/2 minutes, 16mm
- Peyote Queen (1965) 9 minutes, 16mm
- Shaman (1966) 12 minutes, 16mm

- Newsreel: Jonas in the Brig (1964) 5 minutes, B/W, silent, 16mm
- The Recurring Dream (1965) 4 minutes, S8mm
- Ives House-Woodstock (1965) 11 minutes, S8mm
- Malevich at the Guggenheim (1965) 5:45 minutes, S8mm
- Charlotte Moorman’s Avant-Garde Festival #9 (1965) 10 minutes, S8mm
- Deep in the Mirror Imbedded (1965) 14 minutes, S8mm
- Aristotle (1965) 3 1/2 minutes, S8mm
- Sing Lotus (1966) 14 minutes, 16mm
- Cayuga Run. Hudson River Diary: Book I (1967) 18 minutes, 16mm
- Third Eye Butterfly (1968) 10 minutes, 16mm
- Trap Dance (1968) 1 1/2 minutes, B/W, 16mm
- The Tattooed Man (1969) 35 minutes, 16mm
- Hudson River Diary at Gradiew (1970)
- An Experiment in Meditation (1971) 18 1/2 minutes, B/W, silent, 16mm
- Guger's Landing (1971)
- September Express (1973) 6 minutes, 16mm or S8mm
- Wintergarden. Hudson River Diary Book: III (1973) 5 minutes, 16mm
- River-Ghost. Hudson River Diary Book: IV (1973) 9 minutes, 16mm
- Lace of Summer (1973) 4 minutes, 16mm or S8mm
- Geometrics of the Kabbalah (1975) 11:15 minutes, 16mm

Undated:

- And Send My Love to the Wind
- Cruger's Landing
- Heathrow
- Hello Tree
- Swan's Way

She also appears in Piero Heliczer's Dirt (1965), Gregory Markopoulos's Galaxie (1966), and Jonas Mekas's Birth of a Nation (1997), and composed music for the soundtrack of Mekas's Film Magazine of the Arts (1963).

=== Poetry collections ===
- Alleh Lulleh Cockatoo and Other Poems, Brigant Press, 1955.
- Twilight Massacre and Other Poems, Folder Editions, 1964.
- The Shape of Change
- The Atlantean Poems

=== Awards ===
- The Tattooed Man (1969) was the winner of the American Film Institute's first independent film grant.
- Divinations (1964) was the recipient of the New York Women in Film & Television's Women's Film Preservation Fund in 2000. The grant was awarded to the Anthology Film Archives.
- In 2005 the National Film Preservation Foundation awarded grants to the Anthology Film Archives for the preservation of several of de Hirsch's films: Cayuga Run, Guger's Landing, Hudson River Diary at Gradiew, River Ghost and Wintergarden.
- Peyote Queen is included on Treasures IV: American Avant-Garde Film, 1947-1986, a DVD collection published by the National Film Preservation Foundation in 2008. The collection won the 2009 Film Heritage Award (National Society of Film Critics) and was named 2009 Best Avant-Garde Publication at Il Cinema Ritrovato Festival in Bologna.

== Feminist perspective ==
Often described as a feminist, de Hirsch believed that when it came to the creative process there was no distinction between men and women. In 1967, Film Culture published "A Conversation: Shirley Clarke and Storm de Hirsch," in which the two women discussed gender and art.

"I think it's questionable as to whether the biological structure makes that much difference in terms of art. I have my own little theories about this, and I feel that when it comes to art, there's a question of soul, of the inner world, that's a universal thing; and I feel that the soul is neither male nor female."

—Storm de Hirsch, "A Conversation"

In the same conversation, she noted that she often received written responses to manuscripts addressed to "Mr. Storm," and she suspected that her work was better received when magazine editors thought she was male.

== See also ==
- Experimental film
- New American Cinema
- Women's cinema
