= Peyote Queen =

- Still from Peyote Queen
- Directed by: Storm de Hirsch
- Release date: 1965
- Running time: 9 minutes
- Country: United States

Peyote Queen is an experimental short film by Storm de Hirsch, produced in 1965.

== Summary ==
Peyote Queen is the second and best known part of de Hirsch's trilogy, The Color of Ritual, the Color of Thought. It is preceded by Divinations (1964) and Shaman (1966). The film's imagery is abstract, consisting of both live action footage and animated sequences which de Hirsch created by painting and etching directly on the 16mm film stock. Split screens, kaleidoscopic lenses, and abstract animations are used to create a psychedelic effect. De Hirsch had a background in painting (she published an interview of the abstract expressionist painter, Willem de Kooning, in 1955), and her films of this period have been described as "painterly." The soundtrack consists of African drumming and singing interspersed with American pop music.

== Reception ==
As an independent film, Peyote Queen is not well known to the general public, but it has received some positive reviews. Jonas Mekas was enthusiastic, writing in the Village Voice, "Among my favorites ... beauty and excitement." Dominique Noguez, writing in La Nouvelle Revue Française, called it "a very beautiful work! The abstractions drawn directly on film are like the paintings of Miró moving at full speed to the rhythm of an African beat." Reviewers for DINCA and Dangerous Minds have called it "an avant-garde gem" and "a psychedelic classic."

The film is included on Treasures IV: American Avant-Garde Film, 1947-1986, a DVD collection published by the National Film Preservation Foundation in 2008. The collection won the 2009 Film Heritage Award (National Society of Film Critics) and was named 2009 Best Avant-Garde Publication at Il Cinema Ritrovato Festival in Bologna.

Parts of the film are said to be reminiscent of Len Lye's Free Radicals (1958), which also features a drum soundtrack and white-on-black animations created by scratching the film emulsion.

== See also ==
- List of American films of 1965
- Peyote
