= Whale Rock =

Island in Washington County, Rhode Island, United States

Coordinates: 41°26′37″N 71°25′25″W

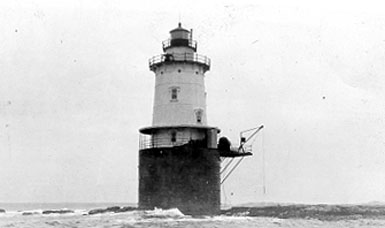
Whale Rock Light

Whale Rock or Submarine Rock is the smallest island in Narragansett Bay in Rhode Island. It is located in the West Passage of the bay in Narragansett, Washington County, Rhode Island, west of the Beavertail area on Conanicut Island. The island received its names because it is shaped like a whale's back or a submarine's bow. It was responsible for numerous shipwrecks prior to the construction of a lighthouse. Whale Rock Light was built on the rock in 1882; it was destroyed by the 1938 New England hurricane, which also claimed the life of keeper Walter Eberle. Part of the lighthouse's foundation can still be seen.

== References and external links ==
- Islands of Narragansett Bay
- Frederic Denlson, Narragansett Sea and Shore, (J.A. & R.A. Reid, Providence, RI., 1879)
- George L. Seavey, Rhode Island's Coastal Natural Areas.
