= Lee Burgess =

American film producer and director

Margaret Lee Burgess Dick (died 1970) was an American film producer and director of independent documentary and industrial films. She was one of the first women to work in the industry and may have been the first American woman with solo directing credits on a documentary film for The School in 1939.

== Personal life ==
Burgess graduated from Bryn Mawr College in 1930. She was an actress and founder of the Truro Tryout Theater in Provincetown, Massachusetts. She married photographer Sheldon Dick in 1933. She divorced Dick and married writer/producer Frank Beckwith in 1945. She died in Florida in 1970.

== Career ==
According to a biographer, Burgess worked as an unpaid assistant for Frontier Films (at which Helen Grayson and Jerome Hill worked as directors) in the 1930s. She produced and directed The School (1939) for her own company, Lee Dick, Inc. According to trade papers, it was "to be shown throughout the summer in the special theatre of the Science and Education Building at the New York World's Fair. . .and was made entirely at the Hessian Hills School at Croton-on-the-Hudson, New York." The quarterly Film Forum Review cited and commended the film's "extremely imaginative construction, its sparing, unobtrusive commentary, and well-recorded dialogue of children." She was one of the original members of the Association of Documentary Film Producers in 1939 and served in roles such as Chair of the Finance Committee.

In 1940, Burgess produced and directed Day After Day, about the visiting nurse services of the Henry Street Settlement House in New York, for Dial Films. She co-produced and directed the soundtrack for Men and Dust (1940), which was photographed, co-produced, and co-directed by her then husband, Sheldon Dick. The film was about the dangers of silicosis and produced for unions in the zinc- and lead-mining areas where Kansas, Missouri, and Oklahoma meet and was released by Thomas Brandon. One scholar of leftist American documentary film history called this film "a priceless, unknown little experimental documentary film that is among the best of the decade."

During WWII, she served as associate director of the Civilian Defense Volunteer Office Film Bureau and undertook with other volunteers from the Amateur Cinema League to produce a film to support a city-wide campaign for increased enrollment of Volunteer Nurses' Aides The Volunteer Nurses' Aide. Joe Comes Back is described as "On the need for industrial workers in war plants. Joe's ghost (montage) revisits the steel plant where Joe worked before he became a soldier and was killed. Being first impressed with the production of military equipment that he sees, he then notices unmanned machinery and an empty addition to the plant. Emphasizes that war work is as important as military service" with writer, Robert T. Furman.

Burgess worked as a director and editor for Willard Pictures for a number of years. She also directed a series on nursing and a State Department film called Rural Nursing. Her career in the 1930-50s spanned different genres within the nonfitional film world but has remained largely unexamined and underappreciated by film scholars.

== Filmography ==
- The City (1937), as production assistant, directed by Willard van Dyke
- The Candid Camera (1938), as assistant director under Edward Anhalt and Willard van Dyke, a one-reel promotional film for Zeiss Cameras
- The School (1939), as director, sponsored by the Progressive Education Association and the American Film Center
- Day After Day.(1940), as producer and director
- Men and Dust (1940), as director of commentary and co-producer
- The Volunteer Nurses' Aide (1942), as production supervisor
- Joe Comes Back (1943?), as director, for Willard Pictures for War Production Board
- Air Raid Wardens Report (194?), for Willard Pictures for Office of Civilian Defense
- Series on nursing (1945), as producer, for Willard Pictures for the US Office of Education
- The New Neighbor (1946) for Willard Pictures, Inc., for the International Motion Picture Division OIC Department of State, distributed by the US Information Service
- Operation Fast Freight (1950), as editor
- Lighted Windows (1954), as editor, for Girl Scouts of the United Stales of America
- Rural Nursing
