= 1938 New England hurricane =

Category 5 Atlantic hurricane

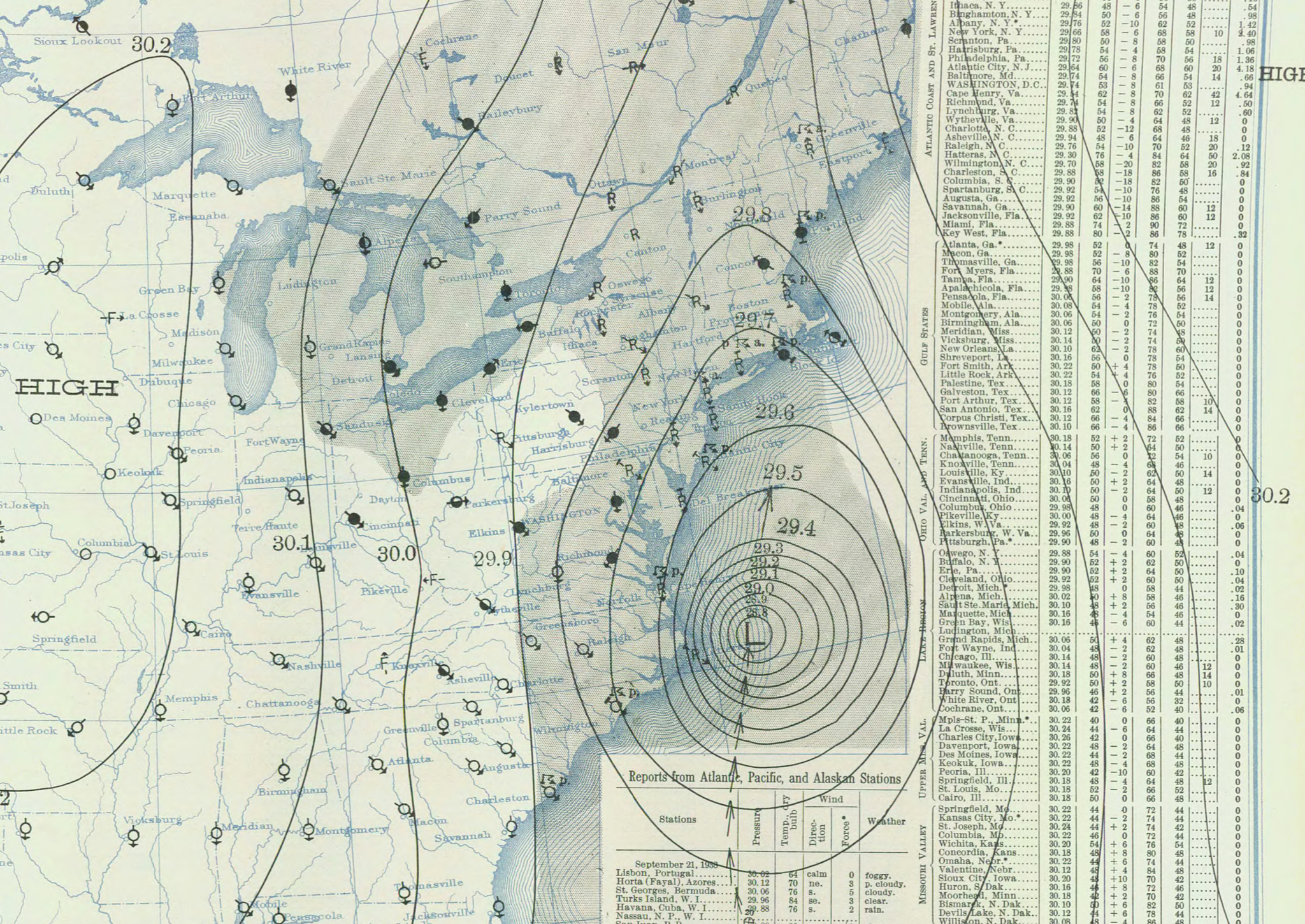
- Surface Weather map of the hurricane shortly before landfall on Long Island on September 21

Meteorological history
- Formed: September 9, 1938
- Extratropical: September 22, 1938
- Dissipated: September 23, 1938

Category 5 major hurricane
- 1-minute sustained (SSHWS/NWS)
- Highest winds: 160 mph (260 km/h)
- Lowest pressure: <940 mbar (hPa); <27.76 inHg

Overall effects
- Fatalities: 682 to 800 direct
- Damage: $306 million (1938 USD)
- Areas affected: Southeastern United States, Northeastern United States (particularly Connecticut, New York, Rhode Island, and Massachusetts), southwestern Quebec
- IBTrACS
- Part of the 1938 Atlantic hurricane season

The 1938 New England Hurricane (also referred to as the Great Long Island - New England Hurricane and the Long Island Express) was one of the deadliest and most destructive tropical cyclones to strike the United States. The storm formed near the coast of Africa on September 9, becoming a Category 5 hurricane on the Saffir–Simpson hurricane scale, before making landfall as a Category 3 hurricane on Long Island on Wednesday, September 21. It is estimated that the hurricane killed 682 people, damaged or destroyed more than 57,000 homes and caused property losses estimated at $306 million ($4.7 billion in 2024). Also, numerous others estimate the real damage between $347 million and almost $410 million. Damaged trees and buildings were still seen in the affected areas as late as 1951. It remains the most powerful and deadliest hurricane to ever strike New York State and New England in history, perhaps eclipsed in landfall intensity only by the Great Colonial Hurricane of 1635.

The storm developed into a tropical depression on September 9 off the coast of West Africa, but the United States Weather Bureau was unaware that a tropical cyclone existed until September 16 when ships reported strong winds and rough seas 350 miles northeast of San Juan; by then, it was already a well-developed hurricane and had tracked westward toward the southeastern Bahamas. It reached hurricane strength on September 15 and continued to strengthen to a peak intensity of 160 mph (260 km/h) near the southeastern Bahamas four days later, making it a Category 5-equivalent hurricane. (Note: The Saffir–Simpson hurricane wind scale was formulated in 1969.) The storm was propelled northward, rapidly paralleling the East Coast before making landfalls on Long Island and Connecticut as a Category 3 hurricane on September 21, with estimated sustained winds of 115–120 mph. After moving inland, it transitioned into an extratropical cyclone and dissipated over Ontario on September 23.

== Meteorological history ==
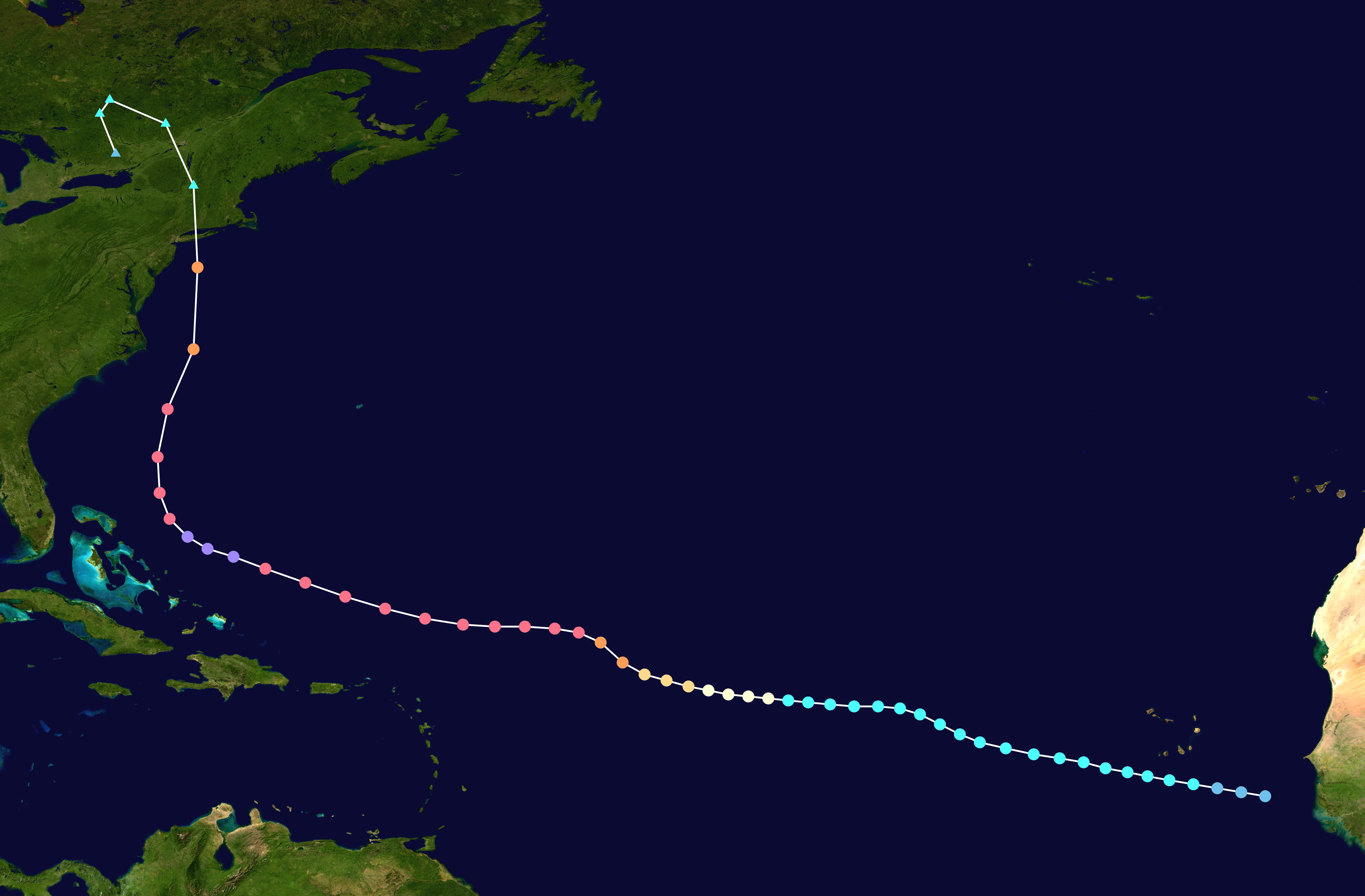
Map plotting the storm's track and intensity, according to the Saffir–Simpson scale Map key Saffir–Simpson scale Tropical depression (≤38 mph, ≤62 km/h) Tropical storm (39–73 mph, 63–118 km/h) Category 1 (74–95 mph, 119–153 km/h) Category 2 (96–110 mph, 154–177 km/h) Category 3 (111–129 mph, 178–208 km/h) Category 4 (130–156 mph, 209–251 km/h) Category 5 (≥157 mph, ≥252 km/h) Unknown Storm type Tropical cyclone Subtropical cyclone Extratropical cyclone, remnant low, tropical disturbance, or monsoon depression

The Atlantic hurricane reanalysis project analyzed the 1938 Atlantic hurricane season in 2012, and Weather Bureau forecaster Ivan Ray Tannehill noted that the knowledge of the storm's existence at the time remained tenuous until September 17 when the cyclone had already increased to a hurricane. Based on land and marine observations, the reanalysis project concluded that the 1938 hurricane began as a tropical depression just off the coast of West Africa at 12:00 UTC (8 a.m. Eastern Standard Time) on September 9, becoming the sixth tropical cyclone of the season. The depression gradually strengthened, becoming a tropical storm less than a day after tropical cyclogenesis. It was inferred to have reached hurricane intensity over the central Atlantic by September 15, though ship observations became increasingly sparse as the cyclone tracked farther away from land. The first definitive indication of a tropical cyclone at sea was a report from the Brazilian ship SS Alegrete which documented a barometric pressure of 958 mbar (hPa; 28.29 inHg) within hurricane-force winds on September 17. Based on this observation, the hurricane had maximum sustained winds of 125 mph (201 km/h), making it the equivalent of a high-end Category 3 hurricane on the Saffir–Simpson hurricane wind scale.

The hurricane continued to slowly strengthen and track westward at around 20 mph (32 km/h) about the southern periphery of a subtropical ridge centered over the Bermuda. On September 18, a strong extratropical cyclone developed just west of Chicago, generating a strong influx of cooler air from Canada into the eastern United States and thus forming a sharp cold front over the region; this frontal boundary resulted in a channel of moist, tropical air being steered northwards into New England. At 18:00 UTC (2 p.m. EST) on September 19, the tropical cyclone strengthened further into a Category 5-equivalent hurricane with sustained winds of 160 mph (260 km/h) while north of the Turks and Caicos; this figure remained unchanged in reanalysis and serves as the storm's peak strength, although the reanalysis project noted that "considerable uncertainty" remains regarding the magnitude of the storm's maximum intensity at sea. Concurrently, the hurricane began to interact with the cold front over the East Coast, causing the tropical cyclone to curve northward towards the northeastern United States; the presence of the subtropical ridge to the east and the stationary nature of the frontal boundary prevented the storm from continuing to curve out to sea.

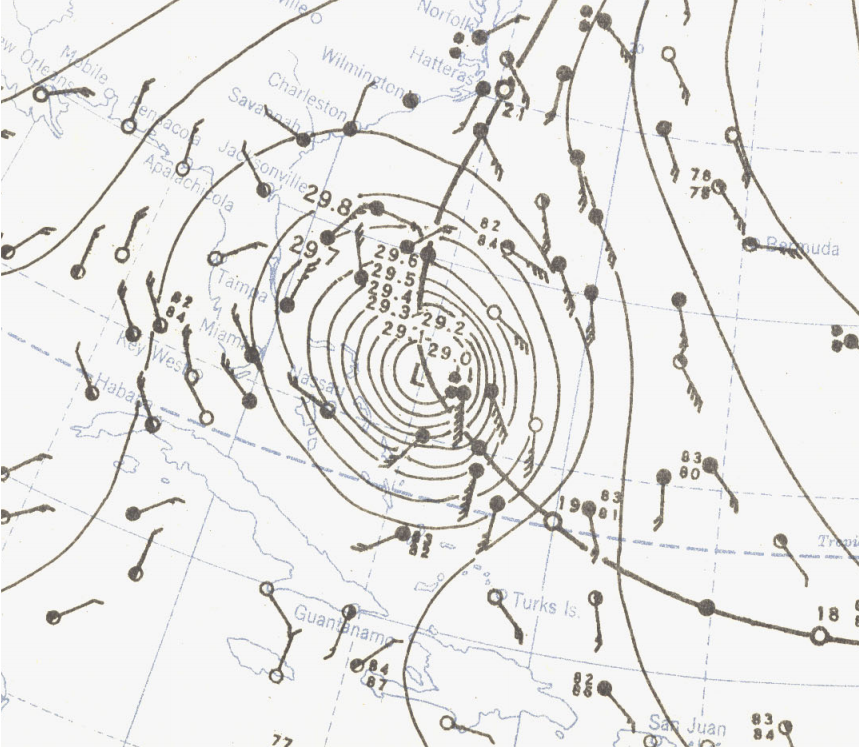
Surface weather analysis of the hurricane shortly after peak intensity on September 20, 1938.

As the hurricane accelerated northward, it gradually weakened. On the morning of September 21, it passed roughly 75 mi (121 km) east of Cape Hatteras. At 12:00 UTC (8 a.m. EST) that day, the storm was estimated to have a barometric pressure of 940 mbar (940 hPa; 28 inHg); this is the hurricane's lowest documented pressure. At 19:45 UTC (3:45 p.m. EST), the hurricane made landfall on Long Island over Bellport, New York with maximum sustained winds of 120 mph (190 km/h) and a pressure of 941 mbar (941 hPa; 27.8 inHg), making it the strongest tropical cyclone to hit the New York City area. It was moving rapidly northward at 47 mph (76 km/h), enhancing the intensity of the winds east of the center; in addition, its forward motion displaced its center of circulation 17 mi (27 km) away from the point of minimum barometric pressure. Weather Bureau forecaster Charles Pierce argued that the hurricane became extratropical off of the Outer Banks, though Charles J. Neumann, Frances P. Ho, and the Atlantic hurricane reanalysis project suggested that it was tropical but in the process of extratropical transition at landfall. Afterwards, it quickly tracked across Long Island and Long Island Sound before making a second and final landfall near New Haven, Connecticut as a slightly weaker hurricane with winds of 115 mph (185 km/h), making it one of only three recorded tropical cyclones to hit Connecticut as major hurricanes since 1900. (Note: A major hurricane is a storm that ranks as Category 3 or higher on the Saffir–Simpson hurricane wind scale. According to the Atlantic Oceanographic and Meteorological Laboratory, those three cyclones were the 1938 New England hurricane, the 1944 Great Atlantic hurricane, and Hurricane Carol in 1954.) The storm rapidly weakened, completing extratropical transition over Vermont by 00:00 UTC on September 22 (September 21, 8:00 p.m. EST). Following this transition, the remnants continued to weaken before they dissipated over southeastern Ontario on September 23.

Synoptic weather maps showing the progress and extratropical transition of the hurricane through September 16–22, 1938
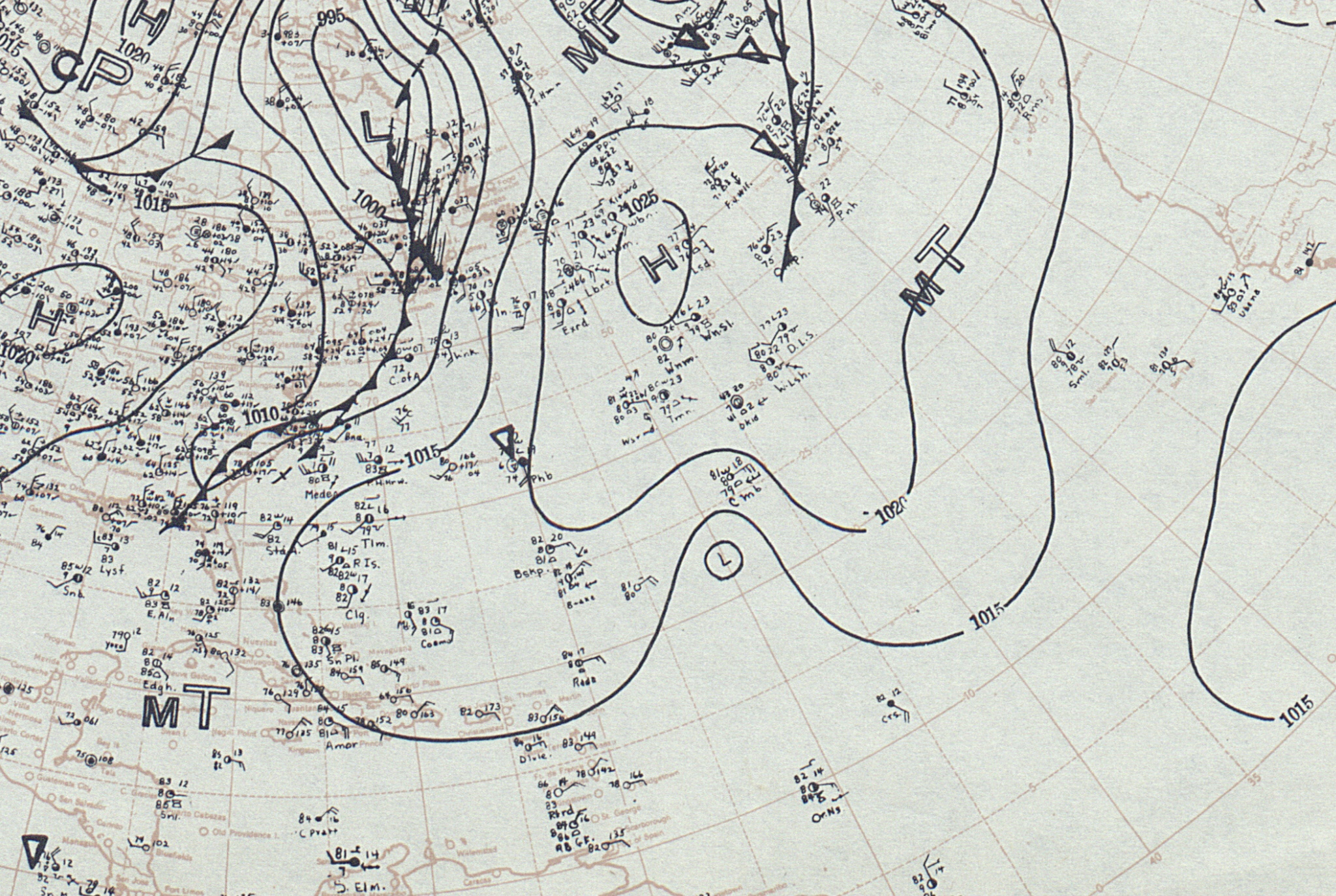
A subtropical ridge builds to the north of the storm, which allowed the hurricane to move west across the Atlantic Ocean on September 16

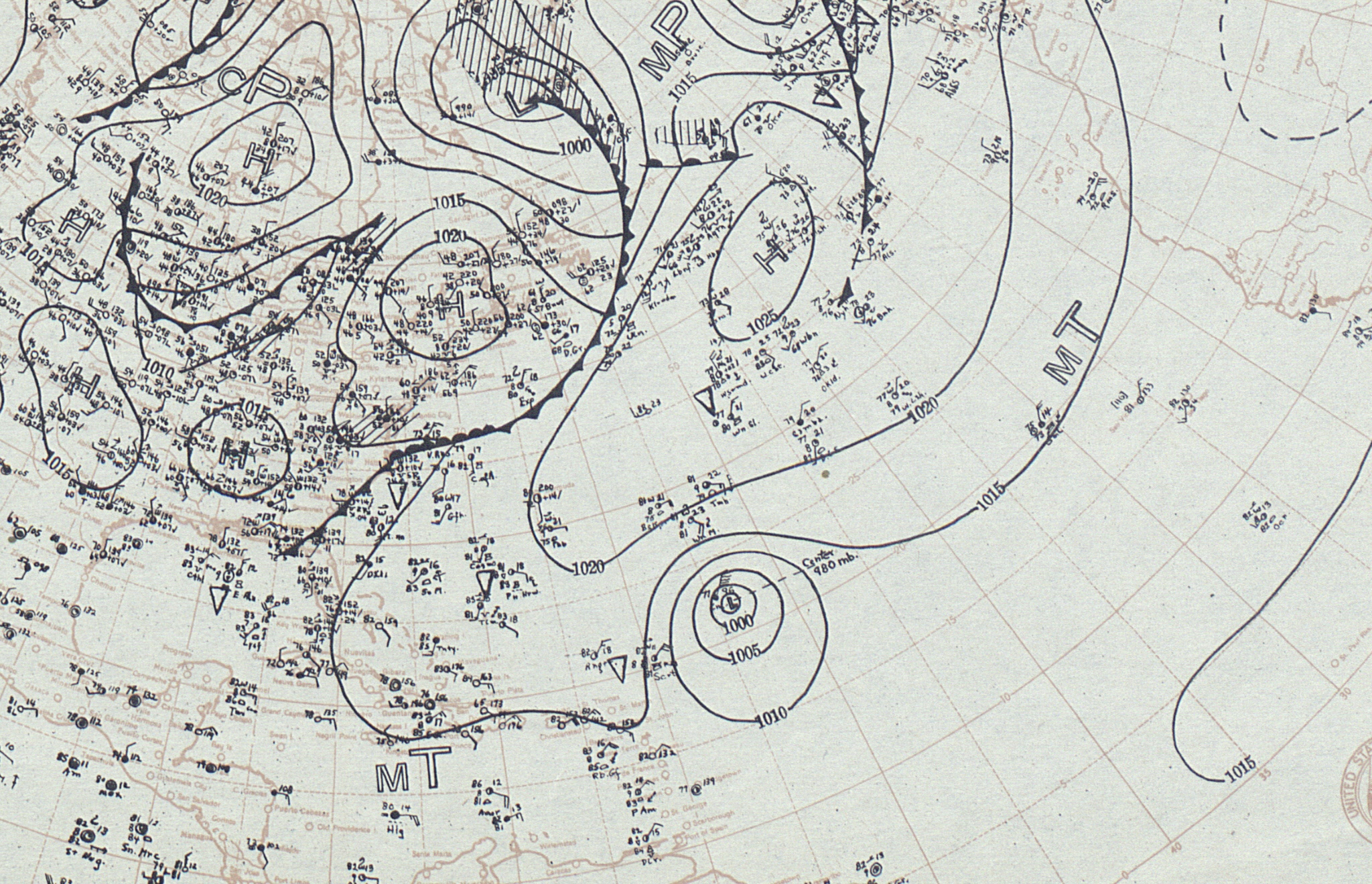
The hurricane intensifies as it continues moving quickly westward, where it would pass to the north of the Leeward Islands on September 17

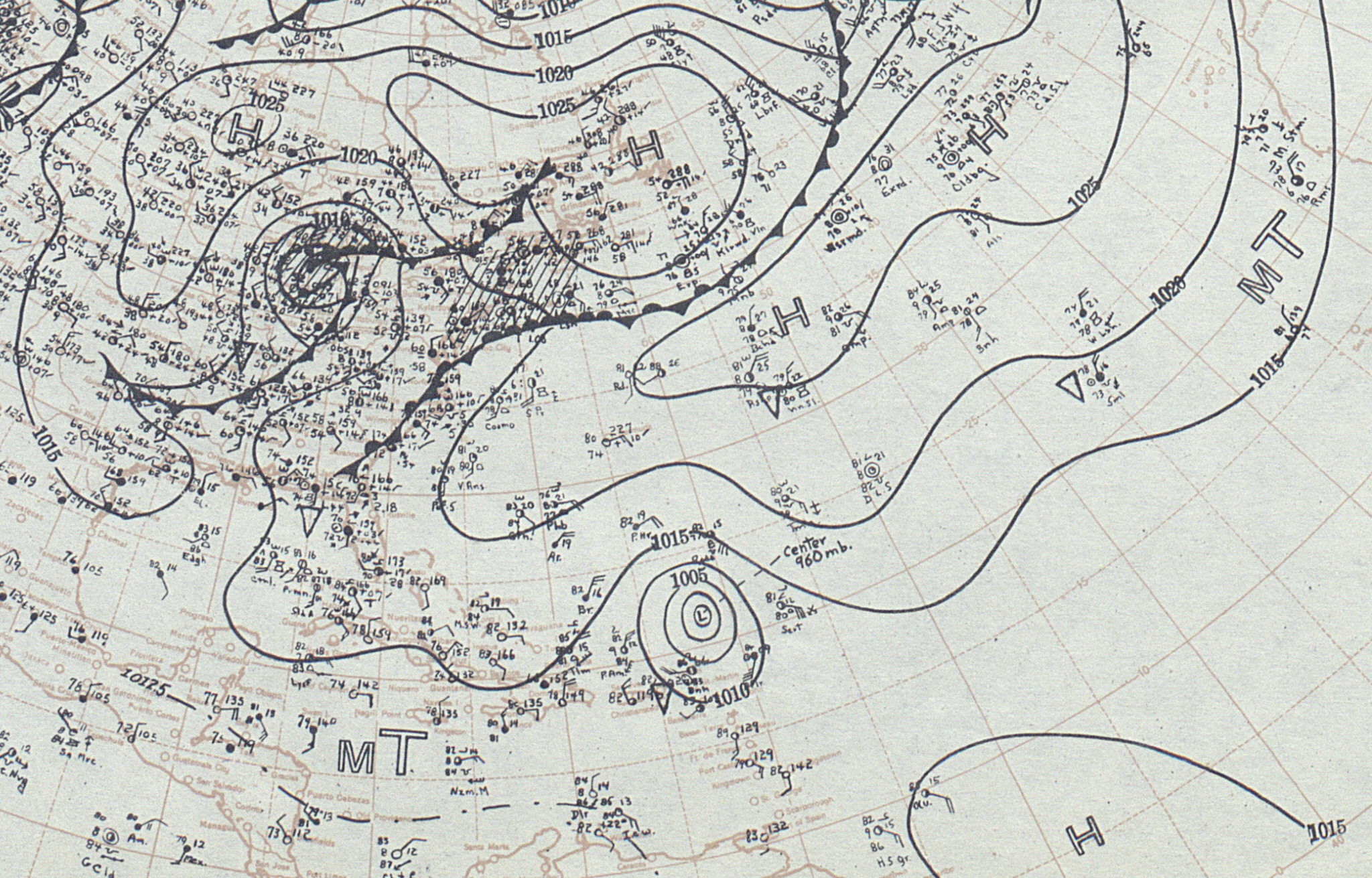
The strengthening of the subtropical ridge over Bermuda continues to steer the hurricane west, while an extratropical low forms over the Great Lakes on September 18

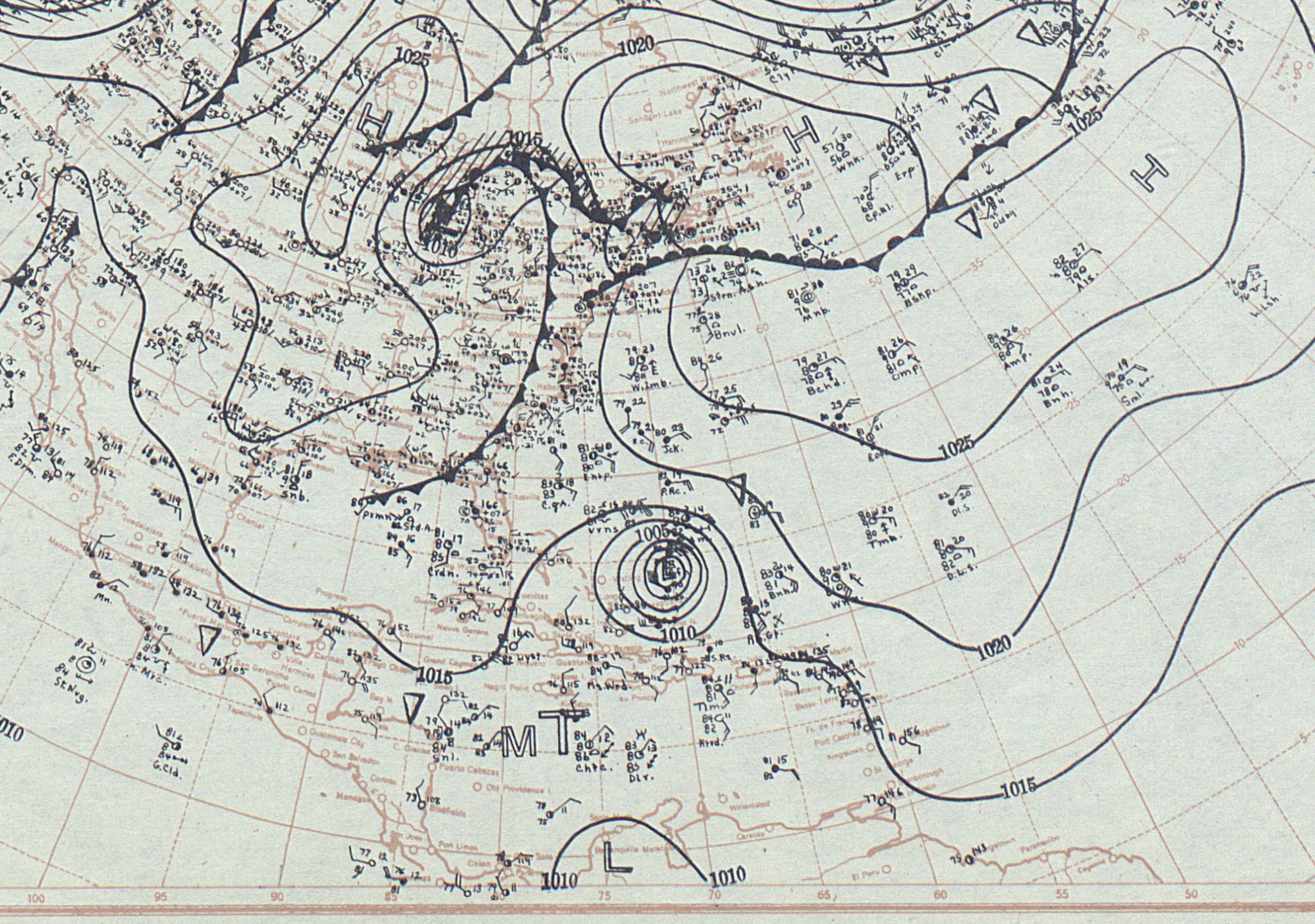
The extratropical low pulls in cold air from the north, allowing it to strengthen and develop a cold front over the Eastern United States on September 19

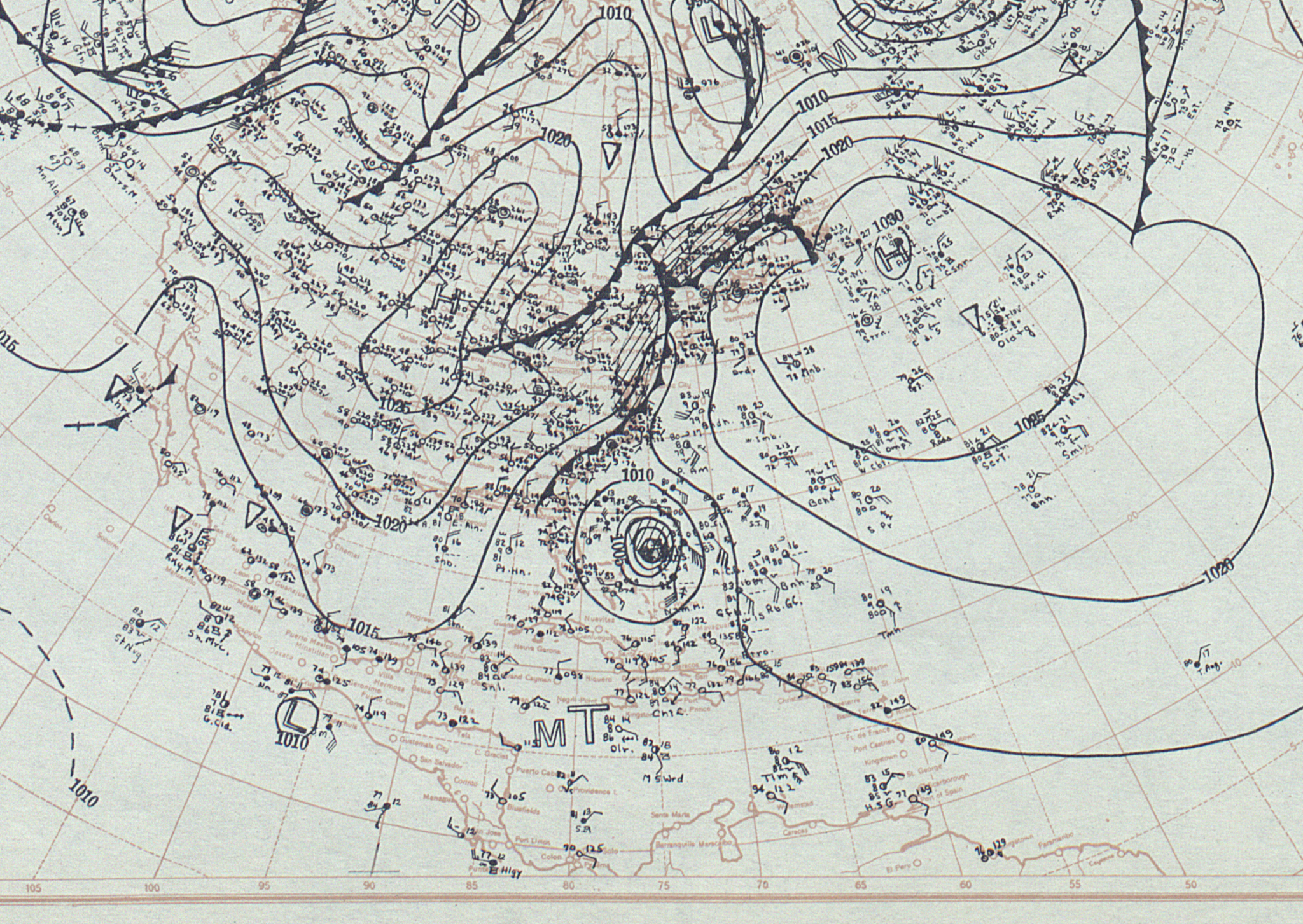
The hurricane begins to be pulled northward by the quasi-stationary cold front on September 20

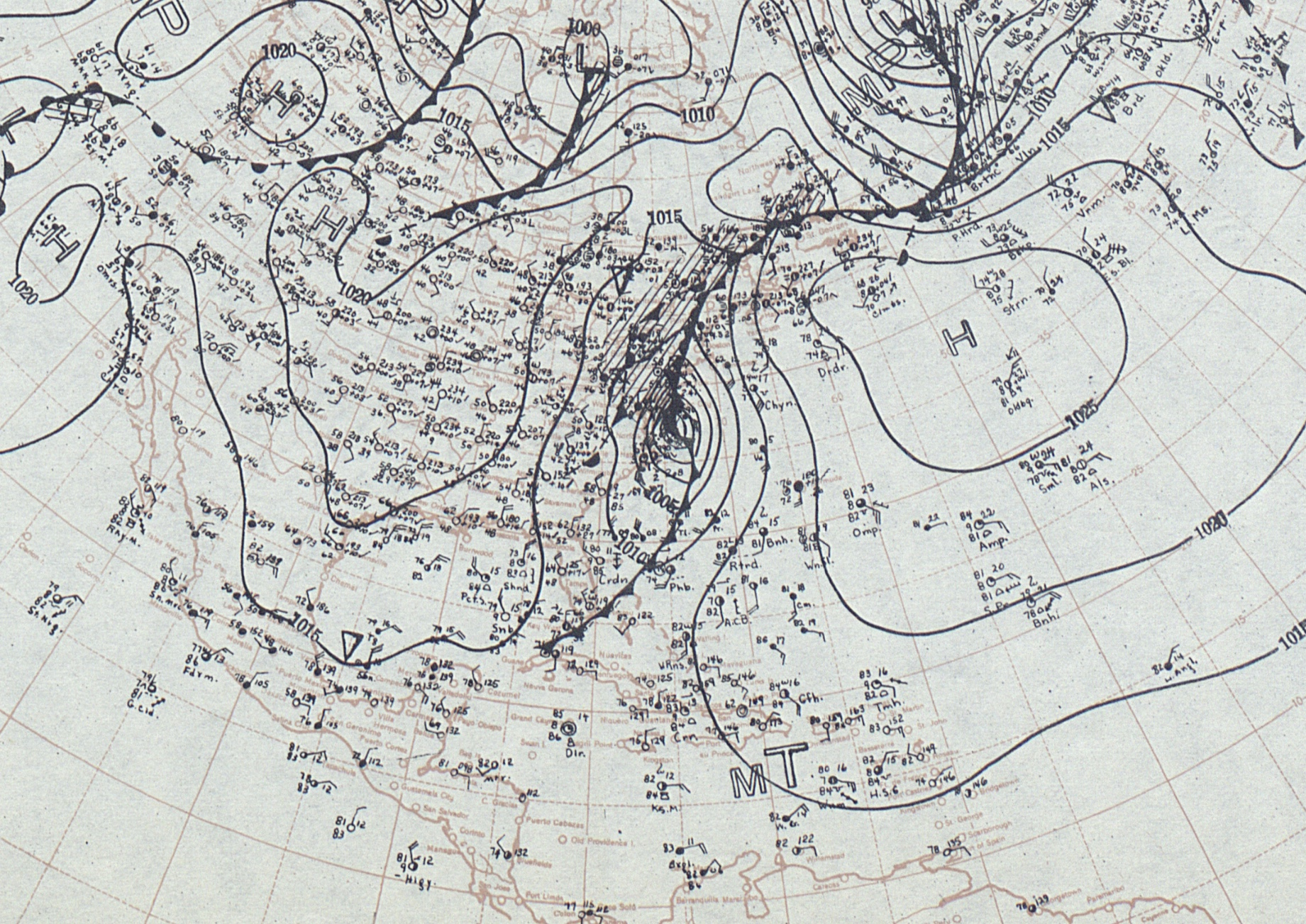
Extratropical transition gradually begins as the hurricane interacts with the frontal boundary on September 21, while also moving rapidly northward towards the Northeast United States

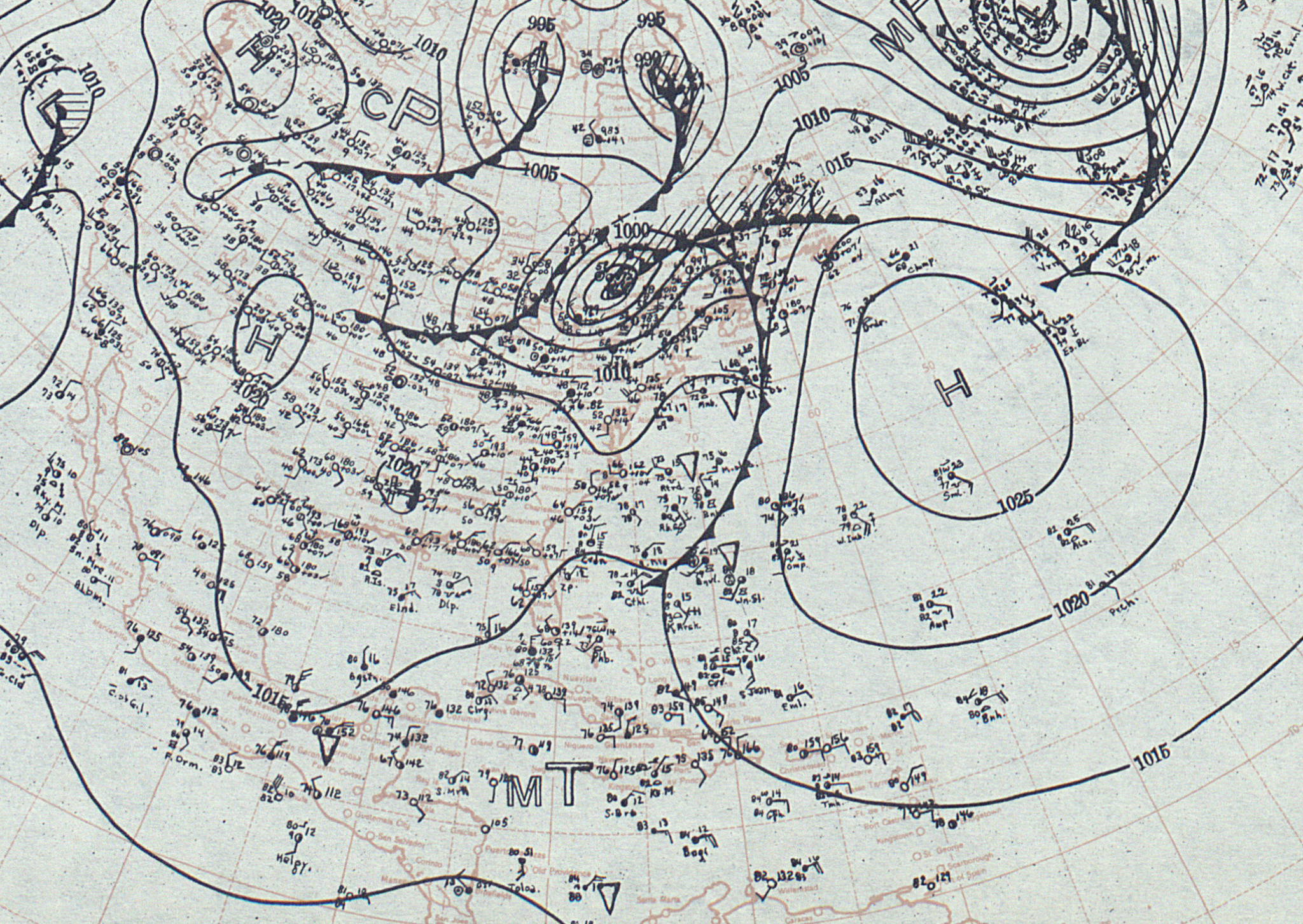
Following landfall, the storm merges with the trough of low-pressure, isolating it from tropical air and completing extratropical transition on September 22

== Forecasting the storm ==
The 1938 hurricane surprised the United States Weather Bureau in that it did not take the typical track as it approached the area of the southeastern Bahamas. Normally, tropical cyclones approach the eastern Bahamas then slowly recurve north and northeast off the United States East Coast and move out to sea. The Jacksonville, Florida, office of the weather bureau issued a warning on September 19 that a hurricane might hit Florida. Residents and authorities made extensive preparations, as they had endured the Labor Day Hurricane three years earlier. When the storm turned north, the office issued warnings for the Carolina coast and transferred authority to the bureau's headquarters in Washington. Both the Jacksonville and Washington, DC offices expected the cyclone to reach the ocean off North Carolina and then head harmlessly out to sea.

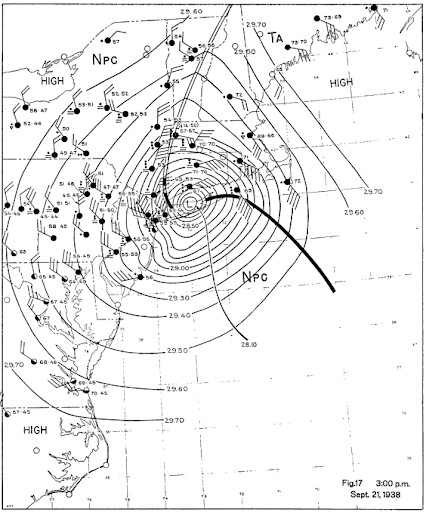
Surface weather map depicting the hurricane's first landfall on Long Island.

At 9:00 am EDT on September 21, the Washington office issued northeast storm warnings north of Atlantic City and south of Block Island, Rhode Island, and southeast storm warnings from Block Island to Eastport, Maine. The advisory, however, underestimated the storm's intensity and said that it was farther south than it actually was. The office had yet to forward any information about the hurricane to the New York City office. At 10:00 am EDT, the bureau downgraded the hurricane to a tropical storm. The 11:30 am advisory mentioned gale-force winds but nothing about a tropical storm or hurricane.

That day, 28 year-old rookie Charles Pierce was standing in for two veteran meteorologists. He concluded that the storm would be squeezed between a high-pressure area located to the west and a high-pressure area to the east, and that it would be forced to ride up a trough of low pressure into New England. A noon meeting was called and Pierce presented his conclusion, but he was overruled by chief forecaster Charles Mitchell and his senior staff. In Boston, meteorologist E.B. Rideout told his WEEI radio listeners – to the skepticism of his peers – that the hurricane would hit New England. At 2:00 pm, hurricane-force gusts were occurring on Long Island's South Shore and near hurricane-force gusts on the coast of Connecticut. The Washington office issued an advisory saying that the storm was 75 mi (120 km) east-southeast of Atlantic City and would pass over Long Island and Connecticut. Re-analysis of the storm suggests that the hurricane was farther north and just 50 mi (80 km) from Fire Island, and that it was stronger and larger than the advisory stated.

== Impact ==
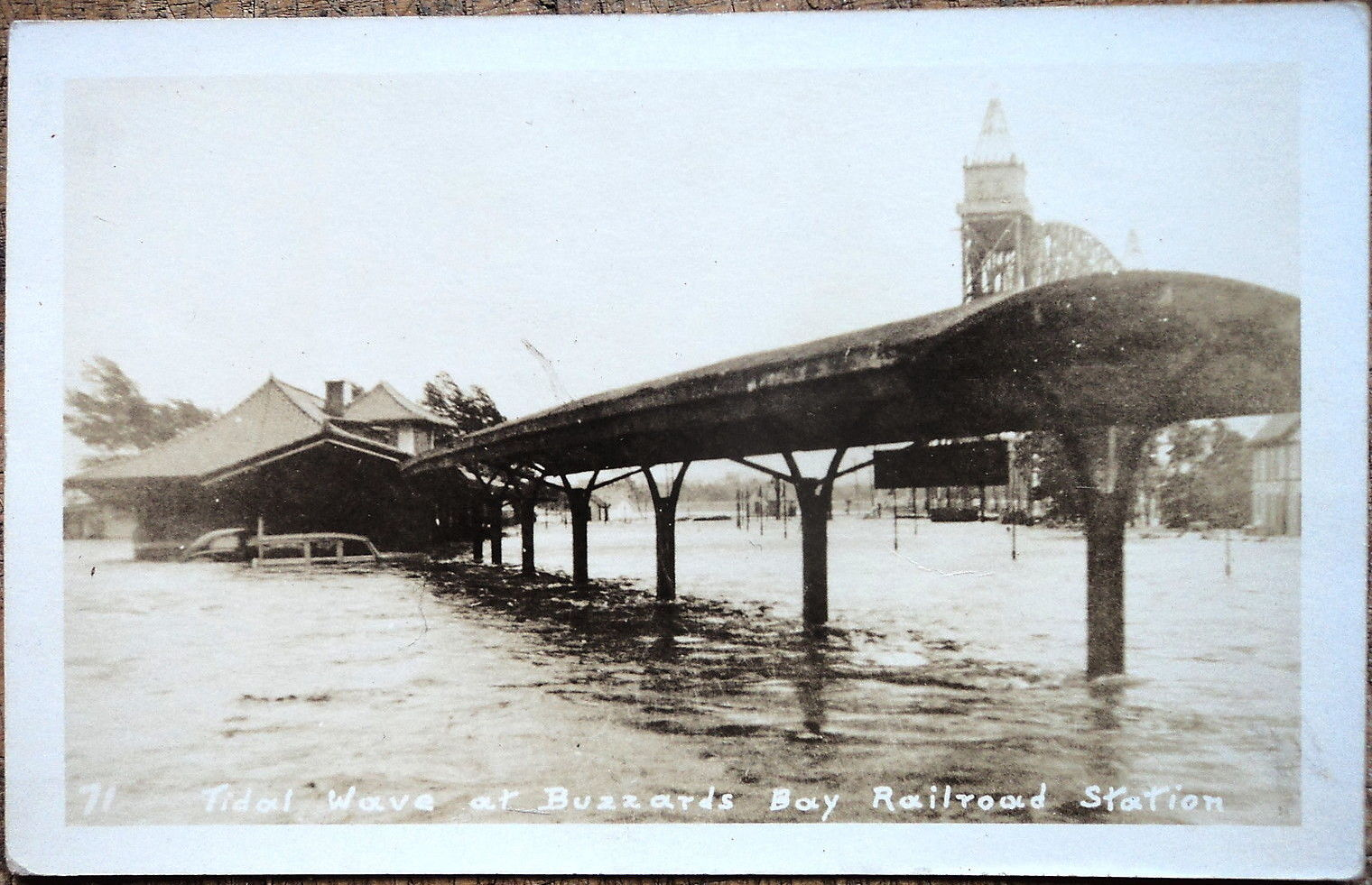
A postcard view of flooding from the hurricane at Buzzards Bay station

The majority of the storm damage was from storm surge and wind. Damage was estimated at $308 million (equivalent to $7.04 billion in 2025), making it among the most costly hurricanes to strike the U.S. mainland. It is estimated that, if an identical hurricane had struck in 2005, it would have caused $39.2 billion in damage due to changes in population and infrastructure.

Approximately 600 people died in the storm on Long Island, New York, and in Connecticut and Rhode Island. An additional 708 people were reported injured.

Loop of the path and storm surge associated with the 1938 New England hurricane

In total, 4,500 cottages, farms, and other homes were reported destroyed and 25,000 homes were damaged. Other damages included 26,000 automobiles destroyed and 20,000 electrical poles toppled. The hurricane also devastated the forests of the Northeast, knocking down an estimated two billion trees in New York and New England. Freshwater flooding was minimal, however, as the quick passage of the storm decreased local rainfall totals, with only a few small areas receiving over 10 inches (250 mm).

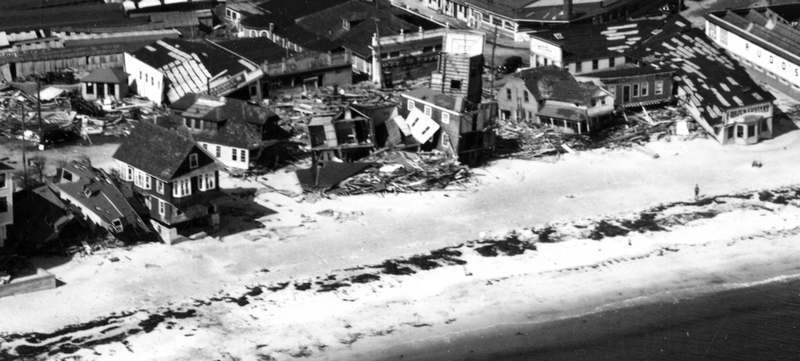
Damage at Ocean Beach Park after the Hurricane of 1938

Over 35% of New England's total forest area was affected. In all, over 2.7 billion board feet of trees fell because of the storm, although 1.6 billion board feet of the trees were salvaged. The Northeastern Timber Salvage Administration (NETSA) was established to deal with the extreme fire hazard that the fallen timber had created. In many locations, roads from the fallen tree removal were visible decades later, and some became trails still used today. The New York, New Haven and Hartford Railroad from New Haven to Providence was particularly hard hit, as countless bridges along the Shore Line were destroyed or flooded, severing rail connections to badly affected towns such as Westerly, Rhode Island. Due to the lack of technology in 1938, Long Island residents were not warned of the hurricane's arrival, leaving no time to prepare or evacuate. " The winds reached up to 150 mph (240 km/h), with waves surging to around 25–35 feet (7.6–10.7 m) high.

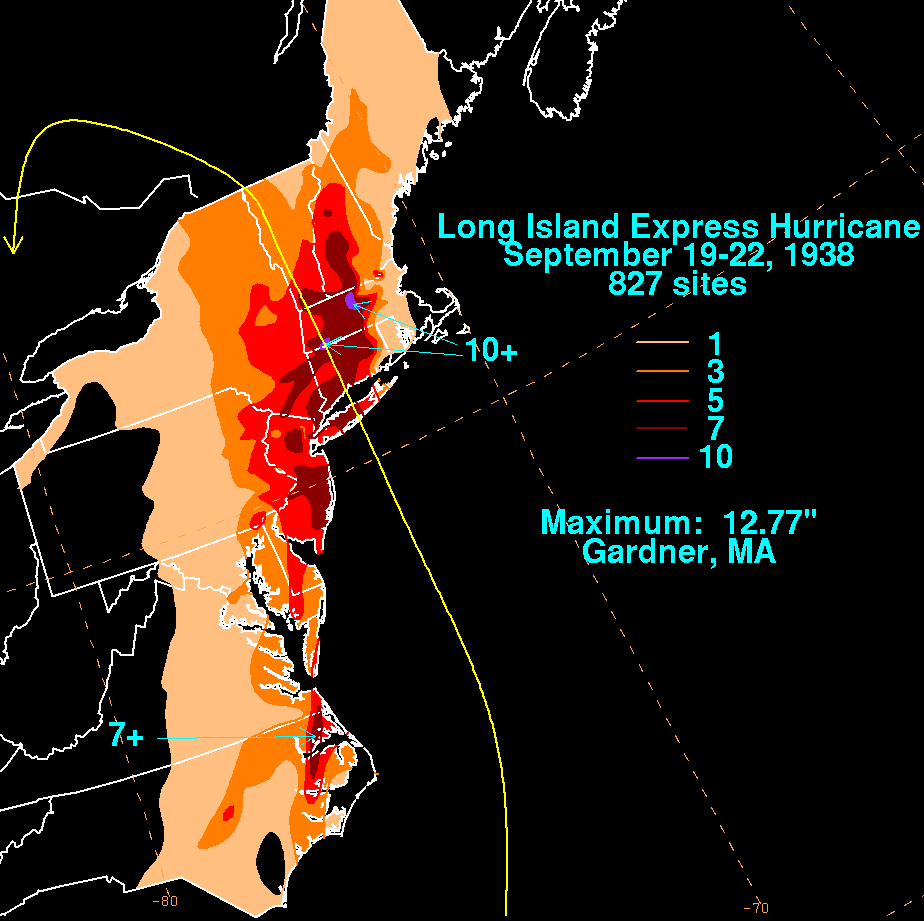
Map of the total precipitation from the hurricane across the Northeast United States

Yale and Harvard both owned large forests managed by their forestry departments, but both forests were wiped out by the hurricane. However, Yale had a backup forest at Great Mountain in northwestern Connecticut which was spared from the totality of the damages, and they were able to keep their forestry program running, which maintains operation today. Harvard's program, however, was reduced as a result.

=== New Jersey ===
The western side of the hurricane caused sustained tropical storm-force winds, high waves, and storm surge along the Jersey Shore and destroyed much of the boardwalk in Atlantic City. The Brigantine Bridge was destroyed over Absecon Inlet between Atlantic City and Brigantine, New Jersey. The surge inundated several coastal communities; Wildwood was under 3 feet (1 m) of water at the height of the storm, and the boardwalk was destroyed in Bay Head and dozens of cottages washed into the ocean. Crops sustained wind damage. The maximum recorded wind gust was 70 mph (110 km/h) at Sandy Hook.

=== New York City and western Long Island ===
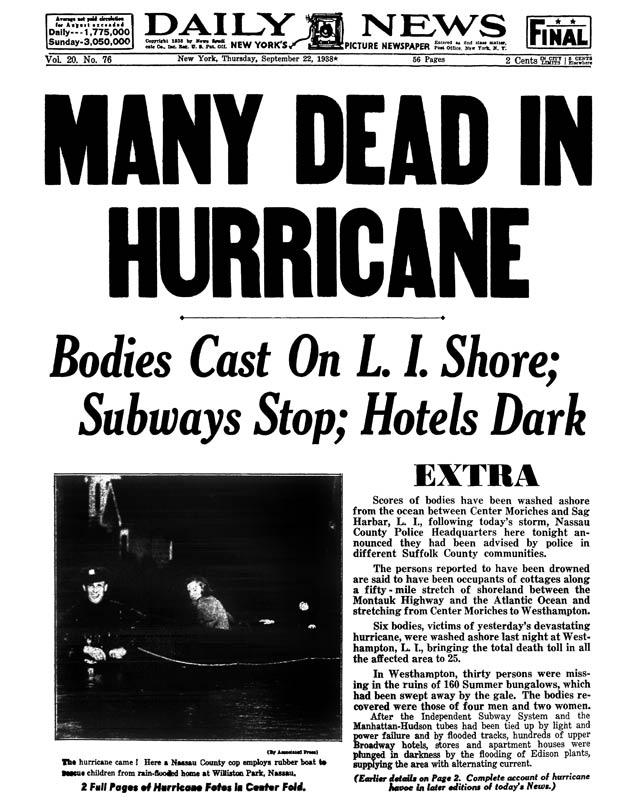
New York Daily News article on September 22, about the aftermath of the hurricane

The metropolitan area escaped the worst of the wind and storm surge because it was hit by the storm's weaker western side. Winds were recorded at 60 mph (97 km/h) at Central Park, Battery Park recorded sustained winds of 70 mph (110 km/h) with gusts to 80 mph (130 km/h), and a gust of 90 mph (140 km/h) was recorded 500 ft (150 m) above ground at the Daily News Building. Winds were estimated at 120 mph (190 km/h) on top of the Empire State Building. The highest winds were from the north to northwest on the back side of the storm. The storm surge was 8.5 ft (2.6 m) at the Battery and the Mean Low Water storm tide was 16.75 ft (5.11 m) at Willets Point. In New York Harbor, the waters rose 7 ft (2.1 m) in a half-hour. In New York City and Long Island, schools were dismissed early. Extensive street flooding occurred because debris blocked drains. The East River flowed three blocks and flooded a Consolidated Edison (Con Ed) plant at 133rd Street, causing power to fail in Manhattan north of 59th Street and in the Bronx for several minutes to a few hours. Railroad and ferry services were suspended for a time. The Staten Island Ferry boat Knickerbocker got stuck in the terminal with 200 passengers aboard. Bridges and tunnels into Manhattan were closed until the following afternoon. 95% of Nassau County lost power, where floods brought traffic to a halt.

During the hurricane, starting before it hit and continuing after, a citywide trucker strike occurred across both NYC and New Jersey, this led to some complications to the relief effort. However, the unions made critical exceptions for relief supplies. Moving food supplies to relief depots, ballots for the New York primary before the hurricane hit while people were evacuating, and manning 1,000 relief sanitation trucks deployed by Mayor La Guardia with supplies after the hurricane had hit.

In Manhasset Bay, almost 400 boats were ripped from their moorings and smashed or sunk, with more than 100 washing up on the beach by the Port Washington Yacht Club. Similar scenes occurred in other locations on the north shore. The J. P. Morgan estate in Glen Cove was heavily damaged. The wife of New York City mayor Fiorello La Guardia was forced to wait out the storm on the second floor of their Northport cottage. Mitchel Field army airfield was buffeted by winds of nearly 100 mph (160 km/h) and was under knee-deep water. In Williston Park, residents of 50 homes needed to be rescued by rowboat when heavy rain the previous few days combined with the rain from the hurricane to overflow a pond.

=== Eastern Long Island ===
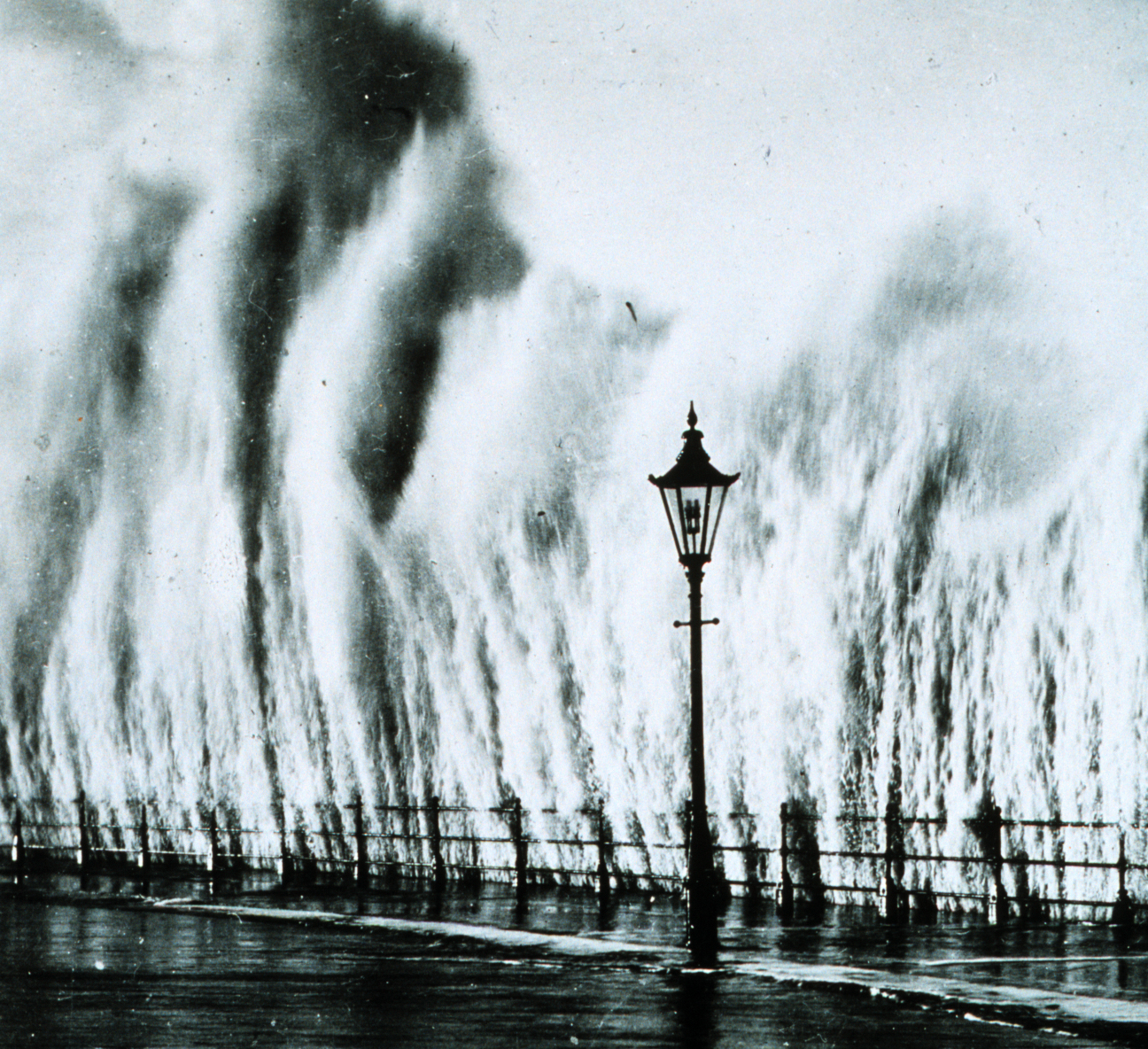
Storm surge from the hurricane hitting a seawall in the New England coast

The orientation of Eastern Long Island facing due south, made it extremely exposed to the storm surge and intense winds. The estimated peak storm tide in parts of eastern Long Island was 20 ft (6.1 m).

A mean low water storm tide of 8 ft (2.4 m) was recorded at Port Jefferson. About 50 people perished in the storm's wake. The Dune Road area of Westhampton Beach was obliterated, resulting in 29 deaths. There were 21 other deaths through the rest of the east end of Long Island. The storm surge temporarily turned Montauk into an island as it flooded across the South Fork at Napeague and obliterated the tracks of the Long Island Rail Road. Many other smaller roads were wiped away in the storm surge. So extensive were the storm surge and overwash on eastern Long Island, that rescue workers had to use utility maps to figure out where roads and homes had been.

Ten new inlets were created on eastern Long Island. The surge rearranged the sand at the Cedar Point Lighthouse so that the island became connected to what is now Cedar Point County Park. The surging water created the Shinnecock Inlet by carving out a large section of barrier island separating Shinnecock Bay from the Atlantic. The storm toppled the landmark steeple of the Old Whaler's Church, which was the tallest building in Sag Harbor. The steeple has not been rebuilt.

Wading River suffered substantial damage. The storm blew down the movie theater on Front Street in Greenport on the North Fork of Long Island. The fishing industry was destroyed, as was half of the apple crop.

=== Rhode Island ===
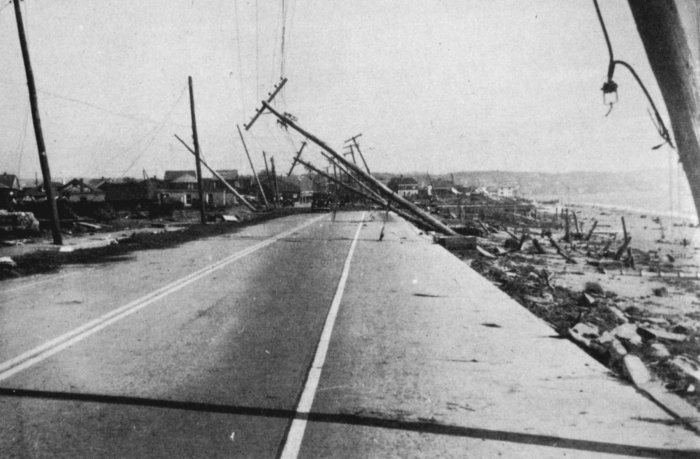
Damage in Island Park, Rhode Island

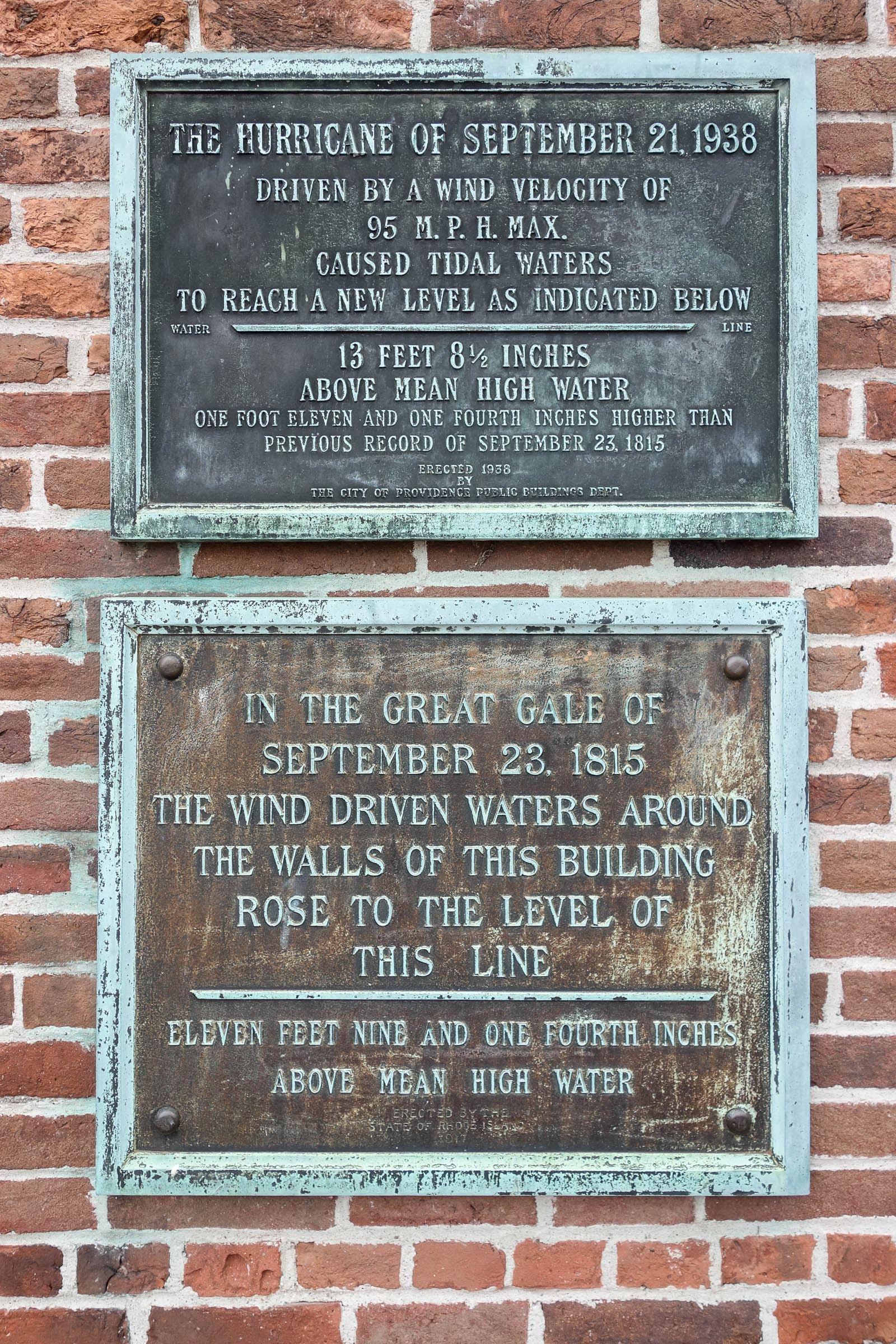
Water levels of the 1815 and 1938 hurricanes are marked at Old Market House, Providence

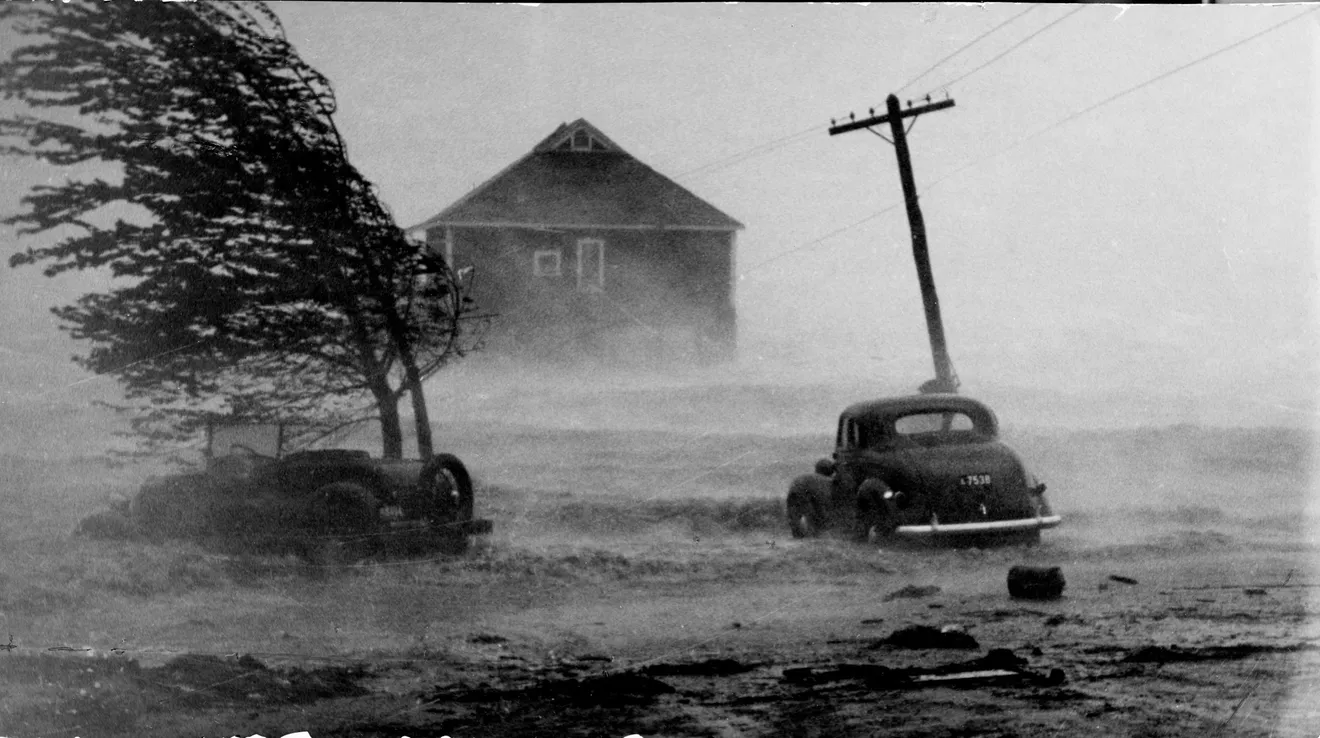
Storm surge flooding at the Washington Park Yacht Club in Providence, Rhode Island during the hurricane

Conditions in Rhode Island began to rapidly deteriorate in the early to mid afternoon. Winds at first blew from the southeast, but shifted to a southerly direction in Rhode Island once the hurricane made landfall on Long Island, just before 3:00 in the afternoon. This meant that the storm surge was sent directly into Narragansett Bay and the South Coast. As a result, the storm surge was especially violent along the Rhode Island coastline, sweeping hundreds of summer cottages out to sea. As the surge drove northward through Narragansett Bay, it was restricted by the Bay's funnel shape and rose to 15.8 ft (4.8 m) above normal spring tides, resulting in more than 13 feet (4.0 m) of water in some areas of downtown Providence. Several motorists were drowned in their automobiles. In Jamestown, seven children were killed when their school bus was blown into Mackerel Cove. Mobs looted stores in downtown Providence, often before the flood waters had fully subsided. The tide was higher than usual because of the autumnal equinox and full moon, and the hurricane produced storm tides of 14 to 18 feet (5 m) along most of the Connecticut coast, with 18 to 25-foot (8 m) tides from New London, Connecticut east to Cape Cod—including the entire coastline of Rhode Island.

Many homes and structures were destroyed along the coast, as well as many structures inland along the hurricane's path, and entire beach communities were obliterated on the coast. Napatree Point was completely swept away, a small cape that housed nearly 40 families between the Atlantic Ocean and Little Narragansett Bay just off of Watch Hill. Napatree is now a wildlife refuge with no human inhabitants. Concrete staircases and boardwalk bases destroyed by the hurricane can still be found when sand levels are low on some beaches. The boardwalk along Easton's Beach in Newport was completely destroyed by the storm.

A few miles from Conanicut Island, Whale Rock Light was swept off its base and into the waves, killing lighthouse keeper Walter Eberle. His body was never found. The Prudence Island Light suffered a direct blow from the storm surge, which measured 17 feet 5 inches (5.31 m) at Sandy Point. The masonry tower was slightly damaged, but the adjoining light keeper's home was utterly destroyed and washed out to sea. The light keeper's wife and son were both killed, as well as the former light keeper and a couple who left their summer cottages near the lighthouse and sought shelter in what they thought was the sturdier light keeper's home. Light keeper George T. Gustavus was thrown free from the wreckage of the house and was saved by an island resident who held a branch into the water from the cliffs farther down the coast. Gustavus and Milton Chase, the owner of the island's power plant, reactivated the light during the storm by running a cable from the plant to the light and installing a light bulb, marking the first time that it was illuminated with electricity.

The original parchment of the 1764 Charter of Brown University was washed clean of its text when its vault was flooded in a Providence bank. Newport recorded the highest water level of the storm at 11.5 feet (4 m) above mean sea level, according to a NOAA study. This storm level is 3 feet (1 m) above the SLOSH model of a 100-year storm, and one estimate is that this water level "reflects a storm occurring roughly once every 400 years." A study of sand deposits also gives evidence that this was the strongest hurricane to hit Rhode Island in over 300 years. The Fox Point Hurricane Barrier was completed in 1966 because of the massive flooding from the 1938 storm, and from the even higher 14.4-foot (4.4 m) storm surge that resulted from 1954's Hurricane Carol, in hopes of preventing extreme storm surges from ever again flooding downtown Providence.

=== Connecticut ===
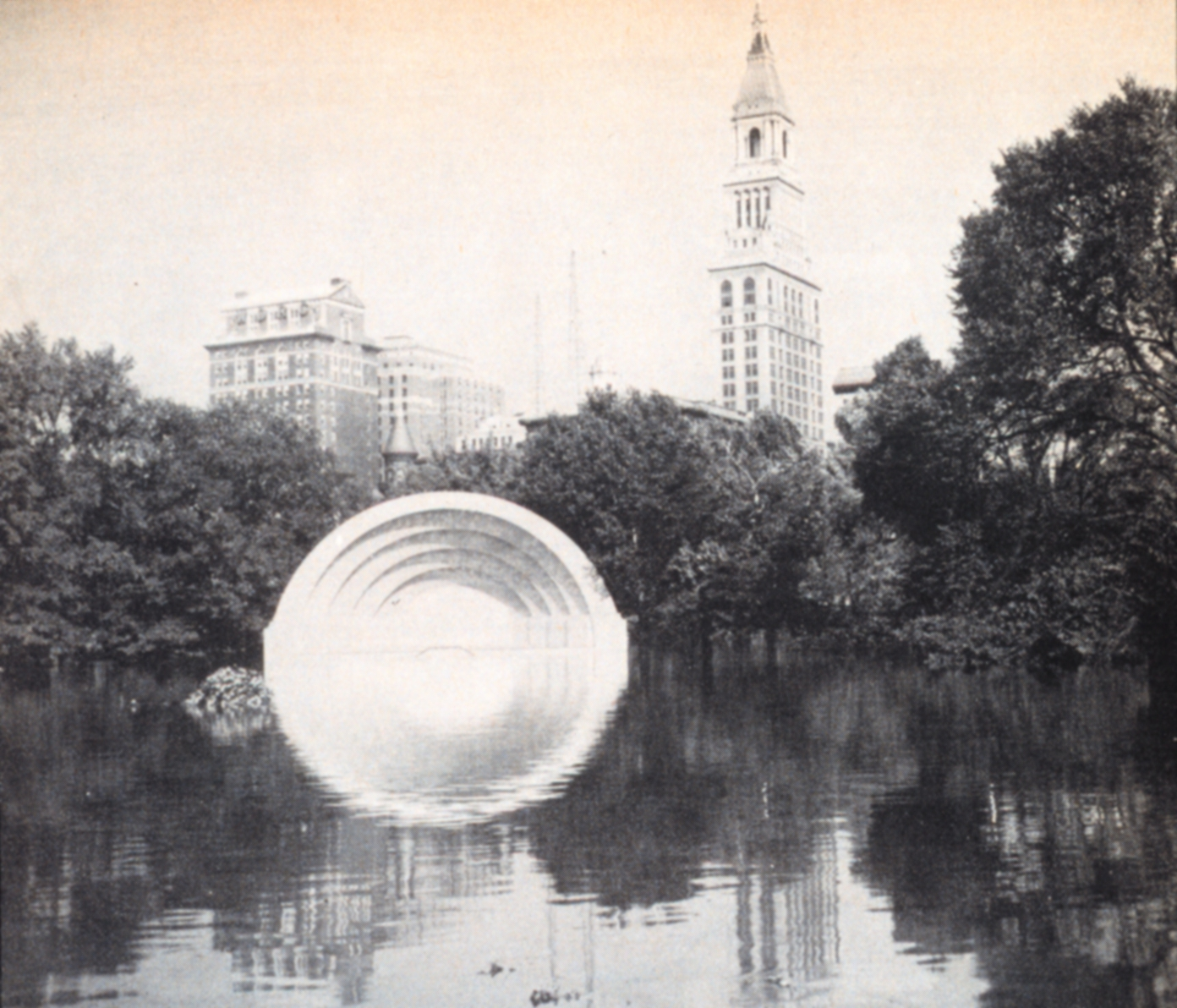
Flooding in Bushnell Park in Hartford, Connecticut in the aftermath of the hurricane; the Travelers Insurance Co. building appears in the back

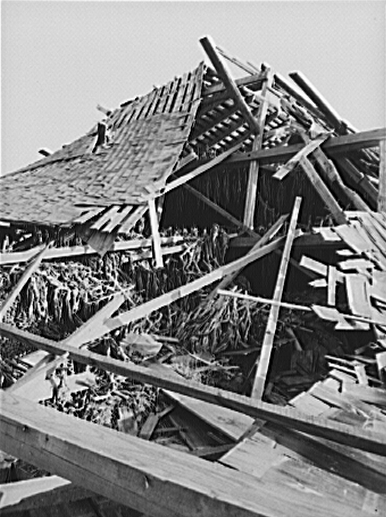
Tobacco barn in Connecticut, 1938, by Sheldon Dick

Eastern Connecticut was on the eastern side of the hurricane. Long Island acted as a buffer against large ocean surges, but the waters of Long Island Sound rose to great heights. Small shoreline towns to the east of New Haven experienced much destruction from the water and winds, and the 1938 hurricane holds the record for the worst natural disaster in Connecticut's 350-year history. The mean low-water storm tide was 14.1 ft (4.3 m) at Stamford, 12.8 ft (3.9 m) at Bridgeport, and 10.58 ft (3.22 m) at New London, which remains a record high.

In the shoreline towns of Madison, Clinton, Westbrook, and Old Saybrook, buildings were found as wreckage across coastal roads. Actress Katharine Hepburn waded to safety from her Old Saybrook beach home, narrowly escaping death. She stated in her 1991 book that 95% of her personal belongings were either lost or destroyed, including her first Oscar for her appearance in Morning Glory, which was later found intact. In Old Lyme, beach cottages were flattened or swept away. The NYNH&H passenger train Bostonian became stuck in debris at Stonington. Two passengers drowned while attempting to escape before the crew was able to clear the debris and get the train moving. Along the Stonington shorefront, buildings were swept off their foundations and found two miles (3.2 km) inland. Rescuers found live fish and crabs in kitchen drawers and cabinets while searching for survivors in the homes in Mystic.

New London was first swept by the winds and storm surge, after which the waterfront business district caught fire and burned out of control for 10 hours. Stately homes along Ocean Beach were leveled by the storm surge. The permanently anchored 240-ton lightship at the head of New London Harbor was found on a sand bar two miles (3.2 km) away. Interior sections of the state experienced widespread flooding as the hurricane's torrential rains fell on soil already saturated from previous storms. The Connecticut River was forced out of its banks, inundating cities and towns from Hartford to Middletown.

Ultimately the storm became the deadliest and costliest storm in Connecticut history.

=== Massachusetts ===
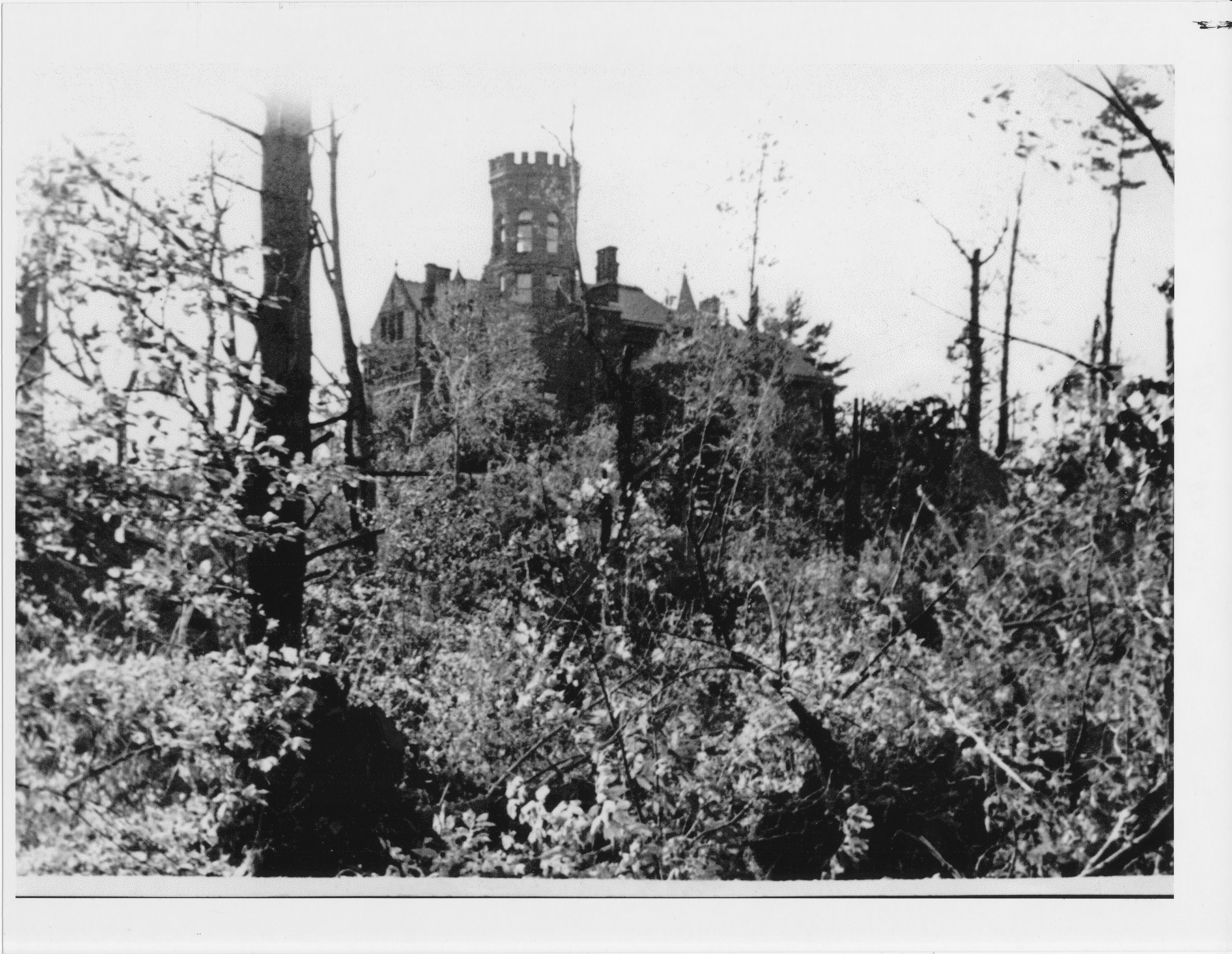
Devastated landscape around Marchmont on September 23, 1938

The eye of the storm followed the Connecticut River north into Massachusetts, where the winds and flooding killed 99 people. In Springfield, the river rose six to 10 feet (3 m) above flood stage, causing significant damage. Up to 6 in (150 mm) of rain fell across western Massachusetts, which combined with over 4 in (100 mm) that had fallen a few days earlier to produce widespread flooding. Flash flooding on the Chicopee River washed away the Chicopee Falls Bridge, while the Connecticut River flooded most of the Willimansett section. Residents of Ware were stranded for days and relied on air-dropped food and medicine. After the flood receded, the town's Main Street was a chasm in which sewer pipes could be seen.

To the east, the surge left Falmouth and New Bedford under eight feet of water. Two-thirds of the boats sank in New Bedford harbor. Several homes were washed away on Atlantic Boulevard in Fall River, and their foundations can still be found on the beach today. The Blue Hill Observatory registered sustained winds of 121 mph (195 km/h) and a peak gust of 186 mph (299 km/h), which is the strongest hurricane-related surface wind gust ever recorded in the United States. A 50 ft (15 m) wave, the tallest of the storm, was recorded at Gloucester. A Boston Braves game against the Chicago Cubs was called during the storm.

The storm filled in a former waterway between Winthrop's Point Shirley neighborhood and Boston's Deer Island with sand and dirt, creating an additional common border between Winthrop and Boston transforming Deer Island at the peninsula's southern tip into an island by name only.

=== Vermont ===
The storm entered Vermont as a Category 1 hurricane at approximately 6:00 pm EDT, reaching northern Vermont, Burlington, and Lake Champlain around 8:00 pm. Hurricane-force winds caused extensive damage to trees, buildings, and power lines. Over 2,000 miles (3,200 km) of public roads were blocked, and it took months for crews to reopen some of the roads. In Montpelier, 120 miles (190 km) from the nearest coast, salt spray was seen on windows. A train was derailed in Castleton. The storm killed five people in Vermont. Sugar maple groves were damaged. It is the only system on record to have entered the state as a tropical cyclone.

=== New Hampshire ===
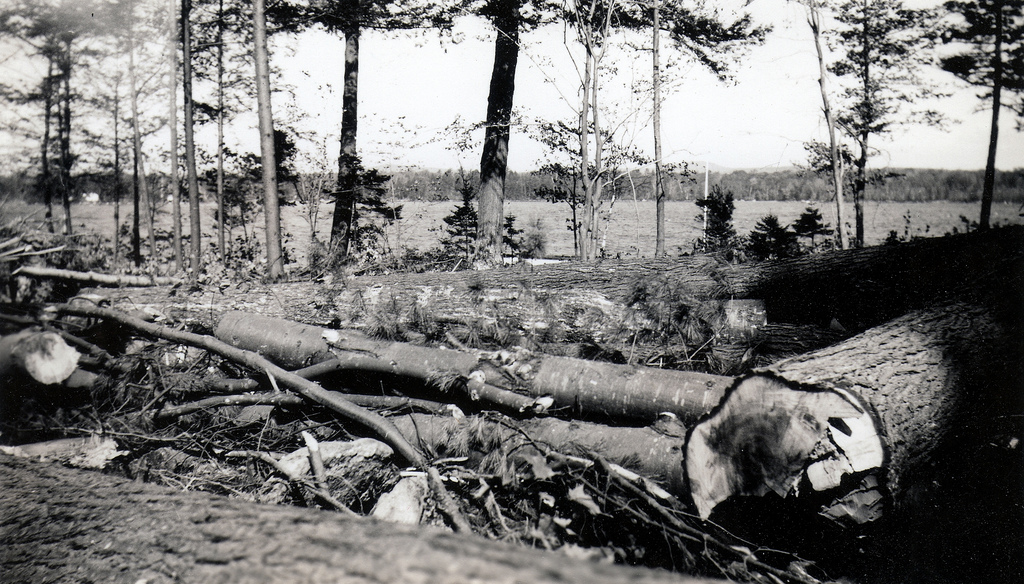
Damage done to pine forests in Wolfeboro, New Hampshire, 1938, by Peter Roome

Even though the storm center tracked further west, through Vermont, New Hampshire received considerable damage. As in Vermont, very high winds brought down numerous trees and electric lines, but rainfall totals in New Hampshire were significantly less than those in other states. Only 1 inch (25 mm) of rain fell in Concord. Damage at Peterborough was worse, however; total damage there was stated to be $500,000 ($11.4 million in 2025), which included the destruction of 10 bridges. Much of the lower downtown burned because floodwaters prevented firefighters from reaching and extinguishing the blaze. Other communities also suffered considerable damage to forest resources. In New Hampshire, 13 people perished. At Mt. Washington, winds gusted to 163 miles per hour (262 km/h) and knocked down part of a trestle on the Cog Railway.

=== Maine ===
In Maine, buildings and trees were damaged and power outages occurred. Storm surge was minimal, and winds remained below hurricane strength. The storm did not claim any lives in Maine.

=== Maryland and Delaware ===
The western periphery of the hurricane brought heavy rain and gusty winds to Delaware and southeastern Maryland. Damage, if any, is believed to have been minimal.

=== Quebec ===
As the hurricane was transitioning into an extratropical cyclone, it tracked into southern Quebec. By the time the system initially crossed into Canada, it continued to produce heavy rain and very strong winds, but interaction with land had caused the system to weaken significantly. Still, many trees were blown down. Otherwise, damage in this region was minimal.

== See also ==
- Hurricane Irene – A major hurricane that passed through New England in 2011, following its landfall
- Hurricane Sandy – A powerful storm that caused significant damage in the Northeastern United States in 2012, mostly as an extratropical cyclone
- List of Atlantic hurricanes
- List of Category 5 Atlantic hurricanes
- List of Delaware hurricanes
- List of New England hurricanes
- List of wettest tropical cyclones in Massachusetts
- List of disasters in Massachusetts by death toll
- List of disasters in New Hampshire by death toll

== Bibliography ==
- Goudsouzian, Aram (2004). The Hurricane of 1938. New England Remembers. Beverly, MA: Commonwealth Editions. ISBN 978-1-889833-75-0.
- Long, Stephen (2016). Thirty-Eight, The Hurricane that Transformed New England. Yale University Press. ISBN 978-0-300-20951-8.

Preceded by 1928 Okeechobee (San Felipe Segundo) (Tied with 1926 Great Miami)	Costliest Atlantic hurricanes on Record; 1938	Succeeded by Carol
