= Cecile Starr =

American film director and screenwriter

- Born: July 14, 1921; Nashville, Tennessee, U.S.
- Died: December 9, 2014 (aged 93)
- Spouse: Aram Boyajian

Cecile Starr (July 14, 1921 – December 2014) was an American film director, screenwriter, educator and author who taught and wrote about moving pictures.

She was born in Nashville, Tennessee. She married film producer Aram Boyajian in 1957. They had two children.

She was a founder and co-director of the Women's Independent Film Exchange. She conducted research for a documentary film on Mary Ellen Bute that she never completed.

In 2015, the New York Public Library hosted a tribute event in honor of her work.

== Early life and education ==
Starr was born in Nashville, Tennessee. She graduated from Louisiana State University in 1941 with a B.A. in Romance Languages. In 1952, Starr graduated from the Columbia University's Teacher College with a Masters in Adult Education. She worked in Columbia's graduate film department teaching film history and criticism from 1955 to 1961.

== Career ==
During World War II, Starr worked at the Australian News and Information Bureau, which was associated during that time with the Office of War Information.

Starting in 1949, Starr began working for the Saturday Review of Literature where she wrote film reviews.

From 1955 to 1961, Starr worked in Columbia's graduate film department teaching film history. Between 1967 and 1968, she helped create and coordinate school film programs for the Lincoln Center Education Department.

Starr was a contributing writer for Sight and Sound, a British film magazine, Film Quarterly and Filmmakers Newsletters. Her writing has contributed to bringing attention to women pioneers in filmmaking, such as Erica Anderson, Lee Burgess, Frances Flaherty, Helen Grayson, Osa Johnson, and Helen Levitt.

== Writings ==
- Experimental Animation: Origins of a New Art (1968), co-authored with Robert Russett
- Ideas on Film: A Handbook for the 16mm Film User (1971)
- Discovering the Movies: An Illustrated Introduction to the Moving Image (1972)
- "American Women: Early Filmmakers", Encyclopedia of the Documentary Film (2006)

== Filmography ==
- Rembrandt and the Bible (1967)
- Islamic Carpets (1970)
- Fellow Citizen: A. Lincoln (1972)
- Richter on Film (1972)
