= Helen Grayson =

American documentary film director (1902–1962)

Helen Grayson (1902–1962) was an American documentary cinematographer, screenwriter, and director. She was among the first female documentary film directors in the United States.

== Early life and education ==
Grayson was born in Philadelphia, Pennsylvania, in 1902 and was privately educated in France where she spent much of her pre-college years with her artist father, mother, and younger brother. She attended Bryn Mawr, where she performed in theater plays and graduated in 1926.

== Career ==
Grayson started her career as theatre costume designer, working as an advisor to the Federal Theatre Costume Workshop during the Depression. She entered the documentary world as assistant cutter to director John Ferno. Working with the Office of War Information, she then served as production manager on Salute to France (1944) with Jean Renoir, Burgess Meredith, Garson Kanin, and Maxwell Anderson. She also was delegated to lead a contingent of French journalists (including Jean-Paul Sartre) on a tour of the United States and informally to direct a short newsreel type film of the event.

She directed for the State Department two films about American history, one on early North American explorations and the other on colonial times. According to one article, "Richard Leacock, who filmed the State Department series on American history that Grayson directed, wrote that he and his assistant 'absolutely loved working for her' and found her 'imaginative... with extraordinary good taste... and responsive to the ideas of those she worked with.'"

Films Bryn Mawr College and A Letter of Thanks were Affiliated Film Productions. The Starting Line describes how the Illinois State Department of Public Health provides specialized care for premature babies for the Southern Educational Film Production Service, and presented by the Virginia State Department of Health in cooperation with the Illinois State Department of Public Health and the US Children's Bureau, Social Security Administration. During the 1950s, she possibly worked for the MCA-TV syndication division.

She was a member of the Screen Directors Guild in New York from 1946–62 and unofficial ambassador of US films in film festivals in France and the UK from 1955-59. She served on juries at the International Short Film Festival in Tours, France, and the Robert J. Flaherty Awards in documentary-film conducted by the Institute of Film Techniques of City College. The Annecy International Animation Film Festival awarded a "Helen Grayson award for a first film" in the 1960s, which included recipients such the film Clay or the Origin of Species by Eli Noyes in 1964.

== Filmography ==
- Salute to France (1944), as production manager
- Herr Kraber Ist Dagengen (Mr. Kraber is Against It), as director
- The Cummington Story (1945), as writer and director, produced by the Office of War Information, with music by Aaron Copland
- Starting Line (1947), as director and producer
- Bryn Mawr College (1947), as director
- The House in Sea Cliff (1947)
- A Letter of Thanks (1948), as writer and director, shows the work that the CARE organization is accomplishing via its food and other parcels to needy Europe, and also shows reaction of recipients to such parcels
- The New World (1951)
- To Freedom (1953)
