= List of female film and television directors =

This is a list of female film and television directors. Their works may include live action and/or animated features, shorts, documentaries, telemovies, TV programs, or videos.

== A ==
- Jennifer Abbott (Canada)
- Sarah Abbott (Canada)
- Jennifer Abod (USA)
- Marguerite Abouet (Ivory Coast)
- Abiola Abrams (USA)
- Mona Achache (France)
- Nan Achnas (Indonesia)
- Ally Acker (USA)
- Jill Ackles (USA)
- Kasia Adamik (Poland)
- Catlin Adams (USA)
- Joey Lauren Adams (USA)
- Perry Miller Adato (USA)
- Anita W. Addison (USA)
- Maren Ade (Germany)
- Harmony Adesola (Canada)
- Elvire Adjamonsi (Benin)
- Dianna Agron (USA)
- Yasmin Ahmad (Malaysia)
- Peggy Ahwesh (USA)
- Shirikiana Aina (USA)
- Kyōko Aizome (Japan)
- Omolola Ajao (Canada)
- Mania Akbari (Iran)
- Chantal Akerman (Belgium-France)
- Desiree Akhavan (USA)
- Zoya Akhtar (India)
- Nargis Akhter (Bangladesh)
- Atuat Akkitirq (Canada)
- Zaynê Akyol (Canada)
- Haifaa al-Mansour (Saudi Arabia)
- Gina Alajar (Philippines)
- Maite Alberdi (Chile)
- Barbara Albert (Austria)
- Karin Albou (France)
- Victoria Aleksanyan (Armenia)
- Lexi Alexander (USA)
- Debbie Allen (USA)
- Elizabeth Allen (USA)
- Jennifer Alleyn (Canada)
- Natalia Almada (Mexico-USA)
- Mairzee Almas (Canada)
- Chihiro Amano (Japan)
- Suzana Amaral (Brazil)
- Tata Amaral (Brazil)
- Barbra Amesbury (Canada)
- Ana Lily Amirpour (UK-USA)
- Bonnie Ammaq (Canada)
- Valerie Amponsah (Canada)
- Allison Anders (USA)
- Deborah Anderson (UK-USA)
- Erica Anderson (USA)
- Gillian Anderson (USA)
- Jane Anderson (USA)
- Laurie Anderson (USA)
- Madeline Anderson (USA)
- Sarah Pia Anderson (UK-USA)
- Sini Anderson (USA)
- Kamila Andini (Indonesia)
- Momoko Ando (Japan)
- Fern Andra (USA)
- Scilla Andreen (USA)
- Joanna Angel (USA)
- Irene Angelico (Canada)
- Lucia Aniello (USA)
- Jennifer Aniston (USA)
- Catherine Annau (Canada)
- Martha Ansara (Australia)
- Jessie Anthony (Canada)
- Lisa Rose Apramian (USA)
- Shamim Ara (Pakistan)
- Danielle Arbid (Lebanon)
- Louise Archambault (Canada)
- Francesca Archibugi (Italy)
- Fanny Ardant (France)
- Jane Arden (UK)
- Asia Argento (Italy)
- Allison Argo (USA)
- Kay Armatage (Canada)
- Aviva Armour-Ostroff (Canada)
- Franny Armstrong (UK)
- Gillian Armstrong (Australia)
- Alethea Arnaquq-Baril (Canada)
- Gwen Arner (USA)
- Andrea Arnold (UK)
- Patricia Arquette (USA)
- Rosanna Arquette (USA)
- Karen Arthur (USA)
- Natasha Arthy (Denmark)
- Larysa Artiugina (Ukraine)
- Ritva Arvelo (Finland)
- Dorothy Arzner (USA)
- Dinara Asanova (Soviet Union)
- Amma Asante (UK)
- Mari Asato (Japan)
- Katie Aselton (USA)
- Asinnajaq (Canada)
- Ratna Asmara (Indonesia)
- Dorothy A. Atabong (Canada)
- Daisy Aitkens (UK)
- Jacqueline Audry (France)
- Shona Auerbach (UK)
- Latesha Auger (Canada)
- Susan Avingaq (Canada)
- Ashley Avis (USA)
- Nurith Aviv (France)
- Ronit Avni (Canada)
- Tali Avrahami (Israel)
- Lisa Azuelos (France)

== B ==
- Beth B (US)
- Jamie Babbit (US)
- Iskra Babich (Soviet Union)
- Julia Bacha
- Yamina Bachir-Chouikh (Algeria)
- Marina Rice Bader (Canada)
- Cindy Baer (US)
- Jennifer Baichwal (Canada)
- Norma Bailey (Canada)
- Paule Baillargeon (Canada)
- Robin Bain
- Catherine Bainbridge (Canada)
- Josiane Balasko (France)
- Ruth Ann Baldwin (US)
- Lucille Ball (US)
- Marta Balletbò-Coll (Spain)
- Anne Bancroft (US)
- Rakhshan Bani-Etemad (Iran)
- Elizabeth Banks (US)
- Sofia Banzhaf (Canada)
- Manon Barbeau (Canada)
- Anaïs Barbeau-Lavalette (Canada)
- Laurence Ferreira Barbosa (France)
- Laura Bari
- Céline Baril (Canada)
- Neema Barnette (US)
- Roseanne Barr (US)
- Katherine Barrell (Canada)
- Cecilia Barriga (Chile)
- Drew Barrymore (US)
- Maria Basaglia (Italy)
- Svetlana Baskova (Russia)
- Angela Bassett (US)
- Michal Bat-Adam (Israel)
- Joy Batchelor (UK-US)
- Kathy Bates (US)
- Signe Baumane (Latvia-US)
- Janet Baus (US)
- Jordan Bayne (US) (Note: A film by: Argo)
- Amanda Bearse (US)
- Maria Beatty
- Marjorie Beaucage (Canada)
- Renée Beaulieu (Canada)
- Gabrielle Beaumont (UK-US)
- André-Line Beauparlant (Canada)
- Aida Begić (Bosnia and Herzegovina)
- Marcie Begleiter
- Fatma Begum
- Feryal Behzad (Iran)
- Nancy Beiman (Canada)
- Esther Bell (US)
- Jennifer Lyon Bell (Netherlands-US)
- Mary Lou Belli (US)
- Edet Belzberg
- María Luisa Bemberg (Argentina)
- Nicol Ruiz Benavides (Chile)
- Jessica Bendinger (US)
- Yamina Benguigui (Algeria-France)
- Sadie Benning (US)
- Denyse Benoit (Canada)
- Amber Benson (US)
- Emmanuelle Bercot (France)
- Amy J. Berg (US)
- Zaida Bergroth (Finland)
- Shari Springer Berman (US)
- Joyce Bernal (Philippines)
- Halle Berry (US)
- Juliet Berto (France)
- Diane Bertrand (France)
- Marguerite Bertsch (US)
- Julie Bertuccelli (France)
- Maïwenn Le Besco (France)
- Jane Marsh Beveridge
- Troy Beyer (US)
- Pooja Bhatt
- Natalie Bible' (US)
- Ric Esther Bienstock (Canada)
- Susanne Bier (Denmark)
- Kathryn Bigelow (US)
- Anna Biller (US)
- Patricia Birch (US)
- Antonia Bird (UK)
- Roshell Bissett (Canada)
- Sophie Bissonnette (Canada)
- Justine Bitagoye (Burundi)
- Simone Bitton (Morocco)
- Catherine Black (Canada, US)
- Marthe Blackburn (Canada)
- Annick Blanc (Canada)
- Sonia Blangiardo (US)
- Katja Blichfeld (US)
- Alexis Bloom (South Africa)
- Lidia Bobrova (Russia)
- Marusya Bociurkiw (Canada)
- Emily Kai Bock (Canada)
- Anna Boden (US)
- Sofia Bohdanowicz (Canada)
- Sonia Bonspille Boileau (Canada)
- Sophie Farkas Bolla (Canada)
- Icíar Bollaín (Spain)
- Natalya Bondarchuk (Soviet Union-Russia)
- Lisa Bonet (US)
- Sandrine Bonnaire (France)
- Manju Borah
- Uisenma Borchu (Mongolia)
- Lizzie Borden (US)
- Joyce Borenstein (Canada)
- Shonali Bose (India)
- Karen Boswall (UK)
- Leyla Bouzid
- Kansas Bowling (US)
- Muriel Box (UK)
- Maureen Bradley (Canada)
- Madeline Brandeis (US)
- Maryann Brandon (US)
- Netalie Braun (Israel)
- Janicza Bravo (US)
- Anja Breien (Norway)
- Catherine Breillat (France)
- Zabou Breitman (France)
- Pietra Brettkelly (New Zealand)
- Amit Breuer (Canada)
- Manon Briand (Canada)
- Zana Briski (UK)
- Tricia Brock (US)
- Beth Broderick (US)
- Sandrine Brodeur-Desrosiers (Canada)
- Katrina Holden Bronson (US)
- Katherine Brooks (US)
- Julie Brown (US)
- Christene Browne
- Frances Buss Buch (US)
- Miriam Bucher (US)
- Valerie Buhagiar
- Lee Burgess (US
- Kathy Burke (UK)
- Nanette Burstein (US)
- Mira Burt-Wintonick (Canada)
- Maria Burton (US)
- Sophia Bush (US)
- Akosua Busia (US)
- Andrea Bussmann (Canada)
- Mary Ellen Bute (US)
- Oksana Bychkova (Russia)

== C ==
- Dominique Cabrera (France)
- Sophia Cacciola (US)
- Anne-Marie Cadieux (Canada)
- Diane Cailhier (Canada)
- Liz Cairns (Canada)
- Terril Calder (Canada)
- Julia Cameron (US)
- Jessica Cameron (Canada)
- Leah Cameron (Canada)
- Peg Campbell (Canada)
- Tisha Campbell-Martin (US)
- Jane Campion (New Zealand)
- Kat Candler (US)
- Jordan Canning (Canada)
- Dyan Cannon (US)
- Kay Cannon (US)
- Dominique Cardona (Canada)
- Fernanda Cardoso (Brazil)
- Patricia Cardoso (Colombia-US)
- Maggie Carey (US)
- Edith Carlmar (Norway)
- Erin Lee Carr (US)
- Niki Caro (New Zealand)
- Ana Carolina (Brazil)
- Joan Carr-Wiggin (Canada)
- Albertina Carri (Argentina)
- Mélanie Carrier (Canada)
- Shelagh Carter (Canada)
- Kirsten Carthew (Canada)
- Alexandra Cassavetes (US)
- Zoe Cassavetes (US)
- Jacqueline Castel (Canada)
- Cecil Castellucci (US)
- Ruth Caudeli (Spain)
- Liliana Cavani (Italy)
- Jennifer Celotta (US)
- Thea Červenková (Czechoslovakia)
- Gurinder Chadha (UK)
- Lydia Chagoll (Belgium)
- Ilene Chaiken (US)
- Tanuja Chandra (India)
- Sylvia Chang (Taiwan)
- Karen Chapman (Canada)
- Lyne Charlebois (Canada)
- Miryam Charles (Canada)
- Martine Chartrand (Canada)
- Lilyan Chauvin (US)
- Shu Lea Cheang (Taiwan)
- Shirley Cheechoo (Canada)
- Joan Chen (China)
- Evelyn Spice Cherry (Canada)
- Mabel Cheung (China)
- Sagari Chhabra (India)
- Patricia Chica (Canada-El Salvador)
- Abigail Child (US)
- Aisling Chin-Yee (Canada)
- SJ Chiro (US)
- Karen Cho (Canada)
- Monia Chokri (Canada)
- Lisa Cholodenko (US)
- Joyce Chopra (US)
- Julian (Mei-Yu) Chou (Taiwan)
- Zero Chou (Taiwan)
- Deborah Chow (Canada)
- Věra Chytilová (Czech Republic)
- Katerina Cizek (Canada)
- Julie St. Claire (US)
- Shirley Clarke (US)
- Millefiore Clarkes (Canada)
- Maja Classen (Germany)
- Marie Clements (Canada)
- Jub Clerc (Australia)
- Susan Cohen (Canada)
- Yulie Cohen (Israel)
- Isabel Coixet (Spain)
- Giada Colagrande (Italy)
- Fabienne Colas (Canada)
- Laurie Colbert (Canada)
- Janis Cole (Canada)
- Cristina Comencini (Italy)
- Nicole Conn (US)
- Heather Connell (US)
- Lisa Connor (US)
- Janice Cooke-Leonard (US)
- Martha Coolidge (US)
- Nancy Cooperstein (US)
- Eleanor Coppola (US)
- Sofia Coppola (US)
- Cristina Kotz Cornejo (US-Argentina)
- Larissa Corriveau (Canada)
- Catherine Corsini (France)
- Helena Cortesina (Spain)
- Ghyslaine Côté (Canada)
- Michèle Cournoyer (Canada)
- Marie-Hélène Cousineau (Canada)
- Courteney Cox (US)
- Kelly Fremon Craig (US)
- Jill Craigie (UK)
- Barbara Cranmer (Canada)
- Judith Crawley (Canada)
- Leanna Creel (US)
- Jeanne Crépeau (Canada)
- Nancy Criss (US)
- Suzanne Crocker (Canada)
- Emma-Kate Croghan (Australia)
- Caitlin Cronenberg (Canada)
- Catherine Crouch (US)
- Fiona Cumming (UK)
- Carolynne Cunningham (Australia)
- Shelley Curtis (US)
- Thirza Cuthand (Canada)

== D ==
- Cherien Dabis (US)
- Nia DaCosta (US)
- Eva Dahr (Norway)
- Holly Dale (Canada)
- Marie-Julie Dallaire (Canada)
- Tamela D'Amico (US)
- Aimée Danis (Canada)
- Mireille Dansereau (Canada)
- Gia Darling
- Joan Darling (US)
- Rima Das (India)
- Julie Dash (US)
- Charlotte Dauphin (France)
- Byambasuren Davaa (Mongolia-Germany)
- Dorothy Davenport (US) (also as Mrs. Wallace Reid)
- Marie Davignon (Canada)
- Tamra Davis (US)
- Roxann Dawson (US)
- Deborah Day (Canada)
- Linda Day (US)
- Camille de Casabianca (France)
- Laura de Jonge (Canada)
- Maria de Medeiros (Portugal)
- Miranda de Pencier (Canada)
- Charlotte de Turckheim (France)
- Marina de Van (France)
- Autumn de Wilde (US)
- Rowan Deacon (UK)
- Josephine Decker (US)
- Tracey Deer (Canada)
- Regine Deforges (France)
- Donna Deitch (US)
- Katrina del Mar (US)
- Julie Delpy (France-US)
- Paula Delsol (France)
- Claire Denis (France)
- Pouran Derakhshandeh (Iran)
- Sophie Deraspe (Canada)
- Maya Deren (US)
- Dhvani Desai (India)
- Virginie Despentes (France)
- Arundhati Devi (India)
- Suprabha Devi (India)
- Aminder Dhaliwal (Canada)
- Aishwarya R. Dhanush (India)
- Ramona Diaz (US)
- Katherine Dieckmann (US)
- Susie Dietter (US)
- Molly Dineen (UK)
- Nia Dinata (Indonesia)
- Mati Diop (France)
- Zoe Dirse (Canada)
- Abigail Disney (US)
- Leila Djansi (US-Ghana)
- Assia Djebar (Algeria)
- Nana Djordjadze (Georgia)
- Shannen Doherty (US)
- Gail Dolgin (US)
- Trish Dolman (Canada)
- Mary Agnes Donoghue (US)
- Mia Donovan (Canada)
- Andrea Dorfman (Canada)
- Anita Doron (Canada)
- Doris Dörrie (Germany)
- Nicole Dorsey (Canada)
- Sara Dosa (US)
- Illeana Douglas (US)
- Elissa Down (Australia)
- Rosvita Dransfeld (Canada)
- Polly Draper (US)
- Fran Drescher (US)
- Marie Dressler (Canada)
- Mr. and Mrs. Sidney Drew
- Kate Drummond (Canada)
- Julia Ducournau (France)
- Germaine Dulac (France)
- Geneviève Dulude-De Celles (Canada)
- Alma Duncan (Canada)
- Lena Dunham (US)
- Jan Dunn (UK)
- Cheryl Dunye (Liberia-US)
- Sophie Dupuis (Canada)
- Marguerite Duras (France)
- Clea DuVall (US)
- Ava DuVernay (US)
- Gaëlle d'Ynglemare (Canada)

== E ==
- Christine Edzard (France)
- Blessing Effiom Egbe (Nigeria) (Note: A film by: The Women)
- Michelle Ehlen (US)
- Debra Eisenstadt (US)
- Jihan El-Tahri (Lebanon-France-Egypt)
- Jan Eliasberg (US)
- Phyllis Ellis (Canada)
- Bille Eltringham (UK-US)
- Sheri Elwood (Canada)
- Erma Elzy-Jones (US)
- Anne Émond (Canada)
- Esther Eng (US)
- Diane English (US)
- Jackie English (Canada)
- Ildikó Enyedi (Hungary)
- Nora Ephron (US)
- Marie Epstein (France)
- Abby Epstein (US)
- Anna Eriksson (Finland)
- Deniz Gamze Ergüven
- Sarah Erulkar (UK)
- Claudia Morgado Escanilla (Canada)
- Danishka Esterhazy (Canada)
- Bang Eun-jin (South Korea)
- Yasmin Evering-Kerr (Canada)
- Ewa Ewart (Poland)
- Valie Export (Austria)
- Tali Shalom Ezer (Israel)

== F ==
- Trey Fanjoy (US)
- Mitra Farahani (Iran)
- Danielle Faraldo (US)
- Coralie Fargeat (France)
- Valerie Faris (US)
- Marianne Farley (Canada)
- Vera Farmiga (US)
- Forough Farrokhzad (Iran)
- Sepideh Farsi (Iran)
- Safi Faye (Senegal)
- Daniela Fejerman (Argentina)
- Rachel Feldman (US)
- Emerald Fennell (UK)
- Lynne Fernie (Canada)
- Pascale Ferran (France)
- Pepita Ferrari (Canada)
- Sally Field (US)
- Chip Fields (US)
- Kim Fields (US)
- Martha Fiennes (UK)
- Sophie Fiennes (UK)
- Denise Filiatrault (Canada)
- Lee Filipovski (Canada)
- Roberta Findlay (US)
- Jeanie Finlay (UK)
- Frauke Finsterwalder (Germany)
- Jenna Fischer (US)
- Jennifer Flackett (US)
- Frances H. Flaherty (US)
- Tracy Flannigan (US)
- Luise Fleck (Austria)
- Ann Marie Fleming (Canada)
- Anne Fletcher (US)
- Shannon Flynn (US)
- Anna Foerster
- Susanna Fogel (US)
- Cheryl Foggo (Canada)
- Deanne Foley (Canada)
- Sheree Folkson
- Megan Follows (Canada)
- Anne Fontaine (Luxembourg)
- Maya Forbes (US)
- Amanda Forbis (Canada)
- Victoria Forester (Canada)
- Mira Fornay (Slovakia)
- Sadaf Foroughi (Iran)
- Kyllikki Forssell (Finland)
- Sarah Fortin (Canada)
- Amparo Fortuny (Spain)
- Gwendolyn Audrey Foster (US)
- Jodie Foster (US)
- Kathryn Foster (US)
- Lilibet Foster (US)
- Tori Foster (Canada)
- Beryl Fox (Canada)
- Jennifer Fox
- Sarain Fox (Canada)
- Rana Abu Fraihah (Palestine-Israel)
- Bonnie Franklin (US)
- Raquel Freire (Portugal)
- Camelia Frieberg (Canada)
- Liz Friedlander (US)
- Kim Friedman
- Vivi Friedman (Finland-US)
- Kim Friedman (US)
- Su Friedrich (US)
- Shirley Frimpong-Manso
- Grete Frische
- Sarah Frost (US)
- Soleil Moon Frye (US)
- Pamela Fryman (US)
- Kei Fujiwara (Japan)
- Belén Funes (Spain)
- Mellissa Fung (Canada)
- Kelly Fyffe-Marshall (Canada)

== G ==
- Bethany Joy Galeotti (US)
- Maya Gallus (Canada)
- Nisha Ganatra (Canada)
- Shruti Ganguly (India)
- Liz Garbus (US)
- Emmanuelle Schick Garcia (Canada)
- Nicole Garcia (French Algiers)
- Jennifer Garner (US)
- Jem Garrard (Canada)
- Katy Garretson (US)
- Jennie Garth (US)
- Sarah Baril Gaudet (Canada)
- Karen Gaviola (US)
- Julie Gavras (France)
- Sarah Gavron (UK)
- Katrin Gebbe (Germany)
- Ngardy Conteh George (Canada)
- Geretta Geretta
- Valeriya Gai Germanika (Russia)
- Greta Gerwig (US)
- Jennifer Getzinger (US)
- Tina Gharavi (Iran-US-UK-NZ)
- Coky Giedroyc (UK)
- Maria Giese (US)
- Melody Gilbert
- Melissa Gilbert (US)
- Leah Gilliam (US)
- Abby Ginzberg (US)
- Tess Girard (Canada)
- Lillian Gish (US)
- Ellen Gittelsohn (US)
- Rose Glass (UK)
- Lesli Linka Glatter (US)
- Delphine Gleize (France)
- Alesia Glidewell (US)
- Lana Gogoberidze (Soviet Union-Georgia)
- Dana Goldberg (Israel)
- Whoopi Goldberg (US)
- Valeria Golino (Italy)
- Sara Gómez (Cuba)
- Rosser Goodman (US)
- Dennie Gordon (US)
- Marleen Gorris (Netherlands)
- Rachel Goslins
- Lisa Gottlieb (US)
- Danis Goulet (Canada)
- Sophie Goyette (Canada)
- Marita Grabiak (US)
- Briar Grace-Smith (New Zealand)
- Debra Granik (US)
- Anais Granofsky (Canada)
- Lee Grant (US)
- Susannah Grant (US)
- Helen Grayson (US)
- Janet Greek (US)
- Lynnie Greene (US)
- Amy Greenfield
- Lauren Greenfield
- Maggie Greenwald (US)
- Ruby Grierson (Scotland)
- Annie Griffin (US-UK)
- Allison Grodner (US)
- Iveta Grófová (Slovakia)
- Esther Gronenborn
- Patricia Gruben (Canada)
- Aurora Guerrero (US)
- Gigi Saul Guerrero (Canada)
- Luce Guilbeault (Canada)
- Sonali Gulati (India-US)
- Xiaolu Guo
- Jasmine Guy (US)
- Alice Guy-Blaché (France-US)
- Maggie Gyllenhaal (US)

== H ==
- Alli Haapasalo (Finland)
- Joana Hadjithomas (Lebanon)
- Lucile Hadžihalilović (France)
- Mona Zandi Haghighi (Iran)
- Helen Haig-Brown (Canada)
- Randa Haines (US)
- Maha Haj (Palestine)
- Pam Hall (Canada)
- Sachi Hamano (Japan)
- Lisa Gay Hamilton (US)
- Sylvia Hamilton (Canada)
- Tanya Hamilton (US)
- Barbara Hammer (US)
- Sanaa Hamri (Morocco-US)
- Michelle Handelman (US)
- Kristin Hanggi (US)
- Teresa Hannigan (Canada)
- Marion Hänsel (Belgium)
- Mia Hansen-Løve (France)
- Banchi Hanuse (Canada)
- Neasa Hardiman (Ireland)
- Catherine Hardwicke (US)
- Mariska Hargitay (US)
- Alicia K. Harris (Canada)
- Danielle Harris (US)
- Emily Harris (United Kingdom) (Note: A film by: Carmilla)
- Mary Harron (Canada)
- Jackée Harry (US)
- Bobbi Jo Hart (Canada)
- Melissa Joan Hart (US)
- Phoebe Hart (Australia)
- Gail Harvey (Canada)
- Jessica Hausner (Austria)
- Goldie Hawn (US)
- Gwen Haworth (Canada)
- Salma Hayek (Mexico-US)
- Helaine Head (US)
- Leslye Headland (US)
- Julie Hébert (US)
- Anne Heche (US)
- Jen Heck (US)
- Amy Heckerling (US)
- Sian Heder (US)
- Birgit Hein (Germany)
- Manijeh Hekmat (Iran)
- Marielle Heller (US)
- Katherine Helmond (US)
- Heather Hemmens (US)
- Felicia D. Henderson (US)
- Maryam Henein (Canada)
- Jill Hennessy (Canada)
- Astrid Henning-Jensen (Denmark)
- Babette Henry (US)
- Kathleen Hepburn (Canada)
- Jennifer Love Hewitt (US)
- Rosemarie Hickson (US)
- Sachiko Hidari (Japan)
- Hikari (Japan)
- Heather Hill (US)
- Cheryl Hines (US)
- Ivy Ho (Hong Kong)
- Lyndall Hobbs (Australia-US)
- Victoria Hochberg (US)
- Tamar Simon Hoffs (US)
- Joanna Hogg (UK)
- Agnieszka Holland (Poland)
- Helen Holmes (US)
- Peggy Holmes (US)
- Nicole Holofcener (US)
- Mahboubeh Honarian (Iran-Canada)
- Solveig Hoogesteijn (Sweden-Venezuela)
- Zoe Leigh Hopkins (Canada)
- Gwyneth Horder-Payton (US)
- Rebecca Horn (Germany)
- Mars Horodyski (Canada)
- Anna Maria Horsford (US)
- Joan Horvath
- Sally El Hosaini (UK-Egypt)
- Dianne Houston (US)
- Bryce Dallas Howard (US)
- Tiffany Hsiung (Canada)
- Huang Hui-zhen (Taiwan)
- Huang Xi (Taiwan)
- Tasha Hubbard (Canada)
- Bronwen Hughes (Canada)
- Ann Hui (Hong Kong)
- Danielle Huillet (France)
- Bonnie Hunt (US)
- Courtney Hunt (US)
- Helen Hunt (US)
- Nicki Hunter (US)
- Tonya Hurley (US)
- Zora Neale Hurston (US)
- Anjelica Huston (US)
- Sophie Hyde (Australia)

== I ==
- Ansa Ikonen (Finland)
- Indrani (US-India)
- Dana Inkster (Canada)
- Laura Innes (US)
- Nyla Innuksuk (Canada)
- Diana Lee Inosanto (US)
- Bodil Ipsen (Denmark)
- Elisapie Isaac (Canada)
- Debbie Isitt (UK)
- Lula Ali Ismaïl (Canada)
- Madeline Ivalu (Canada)
- Julia Crawford Ivers (US)
- Sangita Iyer (Canada)

== J ==
- Mehreen Jabbar
- Annemarie Jacir
- Lisa Jackson (Canada)
- Katie Jacobs (US)
- Sarah Jacobson (US)
- Jeong Jae-eun (South Korea)
- Wanda Jakubowska (Poland)
- Anna Elizabeth James (US) (Note: A film by: Deadly Illusions)
- Annabel Jankel (UK-US)
- Agnès Jaoui (France)
- Sophie Jarvis (Canada)
- Kathleen Jayme (Canada)
- Marianne Jean-Baptiste (US)
- Christine Jeffs (New Zealand)
- Patty Jenkins (US)
- Tamara Jenkins (US)
- Caytha Jentis (US)
- Katherine Jerkovic (Canada)
- Slater Jewell-Kemker (Canada)
- Renuka Jeyapalan (Canada)
- Xiao Jiang (China)
- Liu Jiayin (China)
- Xu Jinglei (China)
- Stephanie Johnes (US)
- Amy Jo Johnson (Canada)
- Karen Johnson (US)
- Kirsten Johnson (US)
- Angelina Jolie (US)
- Stephanie Joline (Canada)
- Amy Holden Jones (US)
- G. B. Jones (Canada)
- Rachel Leah Jones (US-Israel)
- Meryam Joobeur (Canada)
- Hella Joof (Denmark)
- Yashira Jordán
- Mary Jordan (Canada-US)
- Elena Jordi (Spain)
- Nana Jorjadze (Soviet Union-Georgia)
- Suma Josson (India)
- Petra Joy
- Maureen Judge (Canada)
- Miranda July (US)
- July Jung (South Korea)
- Ingrid Jungermann (US)
- Marie-Ève Juste (Canada)

== K ==
- Wanuri Kahiu (Kenya)
- Shahnewaz Kakoli (Bangladesh)
- Kelley Kali (US)
- Alex Kalymnios (US)
- Deborah Kampmeier
- Ellie Kanner (US)
- Nelly Kaplan
- Betty Kaplan (Argentina)
- Deborah Kaplan (US)
- Prema Karanth (India)
- Niki Karimi (Iran)
- Anna Karina
- Alexa Karolinski (Germany)
- Matia Karrell (US)
- Nicole Kassell (US)
- Daphna Kastner (Canada)
- Nancy Kates (US)
- Sandra Kaudelka (Germany)
- Ish Amitoj Kaur
- Mariko Kawana
- Naomi Kawase (Japan)
- Diane Keaton (US)
- Elodie Keene (US)
- Paula Kehoe (Ireland)
- Alan Rowe Kelly (US)
- Jennifer Kent (Australia)
- Elza Kephart (Canada)
- Amanda Kernell (Sweden)
- Sarah Kernochan (US)
- Joanna Kerns (US)
- T'Keyah Crystal Keymáh (US)
- Dorota Kędzierzawska (Poland)
- Noura Kevorkian (Syria-Canada)
- Farah Khan (India)
- Callie Khouri (US)
- Judy Kibinge (Kenya)
- Beeban Kidron (UK)
- Kaleena Kiff (US)
- Ceyda Aslı Kılıçkıran
- Clare Kilner (US)
- Gina Kim (South Korea-US)
- Gloria Ui Young Kim (Canada)
- Jacqueline Kim
- So Yong Kim (South Korea-US)
- Regina King (US)
- Eilis Kirwan (Ireland)
- Eriko Kitagawa (Japan)
- Bonnie Sherr Klein (Canada)
- Karen Knox (Canada)
- Ana Kokkinos (Australia)
- Kathy Kolla (US)
- Frances Koncan (Canada)
- Larysa Kondracki (Canada)
- Sudha Kongara (India)
- Barbara Kopple (US)
- Torill Kove (Canada)
- Alexis Krasilovsky (US)
- Leonie Krippendorff (Germany)
- Ellen Kuras (US)
- Diane Kurys (France)
- Karyn Kusama (US)
- Ayten Kuyululu (Turkey-Sweden-Australia)
- Julia Kwan (Canada)
- Sandra Kybartas (Canada)

== L ==
- Melanie La Rosa (United States)
- Nadine Labaki (Lebanon)
- Vlasta Lah (Argentina)
- Christine Lahti (US)
- Kalpana Lajmi (India)
- Karen Lam (Canada)
- Evelyn Lambart (Canada)
- Alix Lambert (US)
- Mary Lambert (US)
- Micheline Lanctôt (Canada)
- Jessica Landaw (US)
- Valerie Landsburg (US)
- Samantha Lang (Australia)
- Yelena Lanskaya (US-Russia)
- Tanya Lapointe (Canada)
- Brie Larson (US)
- Michelle Latimer (Canada)
- Clara Law (China)
- Teza Lawrence (Canada)
- Tracie Laymon (US)
- Alexandra Lazarowich (Canada)
- Margaret Lazarus (US)
- Elizabeth Lazebnik (Canada)
- Lauren Lazin (US)
- Caroline Leaf (US-Canada)
- Jeanne Leblanc (Canada)
- Alexandra Leclère (France)
- Mimi Leder (US)
- Carinne Leduc (Canada)
- Georgia Lee (US)
- Helen Lee (Canada)
- Iara Lee (Brazil)
- Jennifer Lee (US)
- Karin Lee (Canada)
- Min Sook Lee (Canada)
- Sook-Yin Lee (Canada)
- Wendee Lee (US)
- Kat Lehmer (US)
- Nicole G. Leier (US)
- Jennifer Jason Leigh (US)
- Julia Leigh (Australia)
- Rita Leistner (Canada)
- Valérie Lemercier (France)
- Kasi Lemmons (US)
- Marquise Lepage (Canada)
- Glory Leppänen (Finland)
- Chloé Leriche (Canada)
- Mira Lesmana (Indonesia)
- Chandler Levack (Canada)
- Naomi Levine (US)
- Anne Lévy-Morelle (Belgium)
- Mary Lewis (Canada)
- Sharon Lewis (Canada)
- Li Yu (family name: Li) (China)
- Leslie Libman (US)
- Yin Lichuan (China)
- Allison Liddi-Brown (US)
- Rakel Liekki (Finland)
- Sharon Liese (US)
- Georgina Lightning (Canada)
- Nnegest Likké (US)
- Desiree Lim (Malaysia)
- Caroline Link (Germany)
- Tatyana Lioznova (Soviet Union)
- Christine Lipinska (France)
- Marion Lipschutz (US)
- Lynne Littman (US)
- Renata Litvinova (Russia)
- Jennie Livingston (US)
- Ma Liwen (China)
- Claudia Llosa (Peru)
- Phyllida Lloyd (UK)
- Jayne Loader (US)
- Sondra Locke (US)
- Barbara Loden (US)
- Julia Loktev (US)
- Brenda Longfellow (Canada)
- Kim Longinotto (UK)
- Kamala Lopez (US)
- Sophie Lorain (Canada)
- Ariane Louis-Seize (Canada)
- Juliana Luecking (US)
- Agnieszka Lukasiak (Sweden)
- Helena Lumbreras (Spain)
- Kátia Lund (Brazil)
- Luo Luo (China)
- Ida Lupino (US)
- Joy Lusco (US)
- Noémie Lvovsky (France)
- Lottie Lyell (Australia)
- Dorothy Lyman (US)
- Tucia Lyman (US)
- Jennifer Lynch (US)
- Lisbeth Lynghøft (Denmark)
- Gillian Lynne (UK)

== M ==
- Kate Maberly (UK)
- Tina Mabry (US)
- Angelina Maccarone (Germany)
- Hettie MacDonald (UK)
- Shauna MacDonald (Canada)
- Allison Mack (US)
- Michelle MacLaren (Canada-US)
- Barbie MacLaurin (UK)
- Alison Maclean (Canada)
- Aoife Madden
- Mary Madeiras (US)
- Madhumitha
- Madonna (US)
- Maria Maggenti (US)
- Adriana Maggs (US)
- Sharon Maguire (UK)
- Donatella Maiorca (Italy)
- Maïwenn (France)
- Taru Mäkelä (Finland)
- Hana Makhmalbaf (Iran)
- Samira Makhmalbaf (Iran)
- Sarah Maldoror (France)
- Yassamin Maleknasr
- Anna Malle
- Nancy Malone (US)
- Michelle Mama (Canada)
- Laura Mañá (Spain)
- Gail Mancuso (US)
- Babette Mangolte
- Suhasini Maniratnam (India)
- Ami Canaan Mann (US)
- Andrea Mann
- Émilie Mannering (Canada)
- Michelle Manning (US)
- Dinah Manoff (US)
- Auli Mantila (Finland)
- Alina Marazzi (Italy)
- Sophie Marceau (France)
- Joanne Marcotte (Canada)
- Frances Marion (US)
- Eisha Marjara (Canada)
- Giulia Marletta
- Guylaine Maroist (Canada)
- Liz Marshall (Canada)
- Penny Marshall (US)
- Tonie Marshall (France)
- Lucrecia Martel (Argentina)
- Catherine Martin (Canada)
- Darnell Martin (US)
- Aurora Martinez
- Marsha Mason (US)
- Laetitia Masson (France)
- Mary Stuart Masterson (US)
- Anna Mastro
- Yasmine Mathurin (Canada)
- Tomoko Matsunashi
- Gail Maurice (Canada)
- Elaine May (US)
- Juliet May (UK)
- Melanie Mayron (US)
- Patricia Mazuy (France)
- Rosine Mbakam (Cameroon)
- Trish McAdam (Ireland)
- Aoife McArdle (Ireland)
- Elske McCain
- Beth McCarthy-Miller (US)
- Claire McCarthy (Australia)
- Vera McCord (US)
- Naomi McCormack (Canada)
- Jennette McCurdy (US)
- Paulette McDonagh (Australia)
- Sally McDonald (US)
- Francine McDougall (Australia-US)
- Christine McGlade (Canada)
- Molly McGlynn (Canada)
- Mary McGuckian (Ireland-UK)
- Danica McKellar (US)
- Ashley McKenzie (Canada)
- Nancy McKeon (US)
- Gillian McKercher (Canada)
- Tawnia McKiernan (US)
- Sheila McLaughlin (US)
- Carolyn McMaster (Canada)
- Chelsea McMullan (Canada)
- Lucile McVey (2nd Mrs. Sidney Drew) (US)
- Nancy Meckler (UK)
- Ann Medina (Canada)
- Stella Meghie (Canada)
- Anisa Mehdi (Canada)
- Deepa Mehta (Canada-India)
- Vijaya Mehta (India)
- Hu Mei (China)
- Ursula Meier (France)
- Anna Melikian (Russia)
- Kay Mellor (UK)
- Linda Mendoza (US)
- Weyni Mengesha (Canada)
- Nina Menkes
- Anjali Menon (India)
- Melanie Merkosky (Canada)
- Natalya Merkulova (Russia)
- Agnès Merlet (France)
- Marzieh Meshkini (Iran)
- Márta Mészáros (Hungary)
- Leah Meyerhoff (US)
- Nancy Meyers (US)
- Liu Miaomiao (China)
- Maude Michaud (Canada)
- Vanessa Middleton (US)
- Anne-Marie Miéville (Switzerland)
- Ina Mihalache (Canada)
- Gia Milani (Canada)
- Tamineh Milani (Iran)
- Amy Miller (Canada)
- Elisa Miller
- Rebecca Miller (US)
- Sharron Miller (US)
- Jacquelyn Mills (Canada)
- Pilar Miró (Spain)
- Fawzia Mirza (Canada)
- Efrat Mishori (Israel)
- Adrienne Mitchell (Canada)
- Dorothea Mitchell (Canada)
- Martha Mitchell (US)
- Monika Mitchell (US-Canada) (Note: A film by: The Knight Before Christmas)
- Jill Mitwell (US)
- Ariane Mnouchkine (France)
- Siue Moffat (Canada)
- Tracey Moffat (Australia)
- Hengameh Mofid
- Michelle Mohabeer (Canada)
- Hillie Molenaar
- Josefina Molina (Spain)
- Karen Moncrieff (US)
- Nadine Monfils (Belgium)
- Caroline Monnet (Canada)
- Adriana Monti (Italy)
- Christine Moore (US)
- Jocelyn Moorhouse
- Laura Mora (Colombia)
- Soudabeh Moradian
- Jeanne Moreau (France)
- Yolande Moreau (Belgium)
- Wendy Morgan (Canada)
- Stephanie Morgenstern (Canada)
- Makoto Moriwaki (Japan)
- Carol Morley (UK)
- Judy Morris
- Dee Mosbacher
- Kim Moses (US)
- Emilia Mosquito
- Granaz Moussavi (Iran)
- Jasmin Mozaffari (Canada)
- Katharina Mückstein (Austria)
- Nimisha Mukerji (Canada)
- April Mullen (Canada)
- Kira Muratova (Soviet Union)
- Beth Murphy
- Colleen Murphy (Canada)
- Alison Murray (Canada-UK)
- Tosca Musk (Canada)
- Jinna Mutune (Kenya)
- Anna Muylaert (Brazil)
- Gloria Muzio (US)
- Toni Myers (Canada)
- Léa Mysius (France)

== N ==
- Dana Nachman (US)
- Fanta Régina Nacro
- Ruba Nadda (Canada)
- Janice Nadeau (Canada)
- Phyllis Nagy (US)
- Mira Nair (India)
- Najwa Najjar (Palestine)
- Laurel Nakadate (US)
- Shasha Nakhai (Canada)
- Isabelle Nanty (France)
- Darlene Naponse (Canada)
- Terre Nash (Canada)
- Sandra Nashaat
- Afia Nathaniel (Pakistan)
- Zarqa Nawaz (Canada)
- Anjali Nayar (Canada)
- Lynne Naylor (Canada)
- Mariam Ndagire (Uganda)
- Jennifer Yuh Nelson
- Laura Neri (Belgium) (Note: A film by: A Kiss on the Nose)
- Shirin Neshat
- Rosie Newman (UK)
- Jennifer Siebel Newsom (US)
- Carol Nguyen (Canada)
- Kim O. Nguyen (Vietnam-US)
- Nafiss Nia (Iran-The Netherlands)
- Jill Nicholls (UK)
- Lisa Niemi (US)
- Mary Nighy (UK)
- Jessica Nilsson (Swe/Den)
- Mika Ninagawa (Japan)
- Vijaya Nirmala (India)
- Miwa Nishikawa (Japan)
- Michelle Nolden (Canada)
- Peg Norman (Canada)
- Mabel Normand (US)
- Isabel Noronha (Mozambique)
- Elvira Notari (Italy)
- Lily Nottage (Canada)
- Maria Novaro (Mexico)
- Lynn Novick (US)
- Radda Novikova (Russia)
- Cherie Nowlan (Australia-UK)
- Marti Noxon (US)
- Tereza Nvotová (Slovakia)

== O ==
- Mipo O (Japan)
- Claire Oakley (UK)
- Melanie Oates (Canada)
- Kim O'Bomsawin (Canada)
- Katharine O'Brien (US)
- Shelagh O'Brien (Canada)
- Renee O'Connor (US)
- Alice O'Fredericks (Denmark)
- Eileen O'Meara (US)
- Alanis Obomsawin (Canada)
- Diane Obomsawin (Canada)
- Paula van der Oest (Netherlands)
- Naoko Ogigami (Japan)
- Mipo Oh (Japan)
- Linda Ohama (Canada)
- Annette K. Olesen (Denmark)
- Susan Oliver (US)
- Madeleine Olnek (US)
- Jenni Olson (US)
- Gulshat Omarova (Kazakhstan)
- Yoko Ono (US-Japan)
- Midi Onodera (Canada)
- Ngozi Onwurah (Nigeria-UK)
- Suemay Oram (UK-Brazil)
- Ruth Orkin (US)
- Renée Oro (Argentina)
- Katrin Ottarsdóttir (Faroe Islands)
- Ulrike Ottinger (Germany)
- Halima Ouardiri (Switzerland-Canada)
- Jackie Oudney (UK)
- Akosua Adoma Owusu (US)
- Jan Oxenberg (US)
- Kelly Oxford (Canada)

== P ==
- Nisha Pahuja (Canada)
- Indrani Pal-Chaudhuri (US, India, Canada, UK)
- Euzhan Palcy (Martinique)
- Gail Palmer
- Sai Paranjpye (India)
- Véréna Paravel (France)
- Megan Park (Canada)
- Claire Parker (US-France)
- Francine Parker (US)
- Gudrun Parker (Canada)
- Molly Parker (Canada)
- Pratibha Parmar (Kenya-UK)
- Laura Parnes
- Christine Pascal (France)
- Stacie Passon (US)
- Lesley Ann Patten (Canada)
- Paula Patton (US)
- Nelofer Pazira
- Barbara Peeters (US)
- Kimberly Peirce (US)
- Andrée Pelletier (Canada)
- Francine Pelletier (journalist) (Canada)
- Alexandra Pelosi (US)
- Nadine Pequeneza (Canada)
- Sumitra Peries
- Cristina Perincioli (Switzerland-Germany)
- Janet Perlman
- Ellen Perry (US)
- Donna Pescow (US)
- Kristine Peterson
- Lori Petty (US)
- Jennifer Phang (US)
- Carmine Pierre-Dufour (Canada)
- Ileana Pietrobruno (Canada)
- Lydia Dean Pilcher (US)
- Justine Pimlott (Canada)
- Carol Pineau
- Agnieszka Piotrowska (UK)
- Zuzana Piussi (Slovakia)
- Mary Kay Place (US)
- Jennifer Podemski (Canada)
- Amy Poehler (US)
- Anne Claire Poirier (Canada)
- Laura Poitras (US)
- Lindsey Pollard (Canada)
- Sarah Polley (Canada)
- Léa Pool (Switzerland-Canada)
- Leanne Pooley (New Zealand)
- Cynthia J. Popp (US)
- Dawn Porter (US)
- Lourdes Portillo (US-Mexico)
- Natalie Portman (Israel-US)
- Franka Potente (Germany)
- Sally Potter (UK)
- Brigitte Poupart (Canada)
- Deborah Pratt (US)
- Olga Preobrazhenskaya (Russian Empire-USSR)
- Ellen S. Pressman (US)
- Gaylene Preston (New Zealand)
- Carrie Preston (US)
- Claire Prieto (Canada)
- Gina Prince-Bythewood (US)
- Kardeisha Provo (Canada)
- Lkhagvadulam Purev-Ochir (Mongolia)

== Q ==
- Vivian Qu (China)
- Gracia Querejeta (Spain)
- Katell Quillévéré (France)
- Joanna Quinn (UK)

== R ==
- Tahani Rached (Canada)
- Deborah Raffin (US)
- Eliane Raheb (Lebanon)
- Rachel Raimist (US)
- Yvonne Rainer (US)
- Rajashree
- Soundarya Rajinikanth
- Peggy Rajski (US)
- Bhanumathi Ramakrishna
- Lynne Ramsay (UK)
- Suze Randall
- Roopa Rao (India)
- Jenny Raskin (US)
- Irma Raush (Soviet Union-Russia)
- Olga Rautenkranzová (Czechoslovakia)
- Trisha Ray
- Amy Redford (US)
- Cleo Reece (Canada)
- Jennifer Reeder (US)
- Dee Rees (US)
- Kelly Reichardt (US)
- Halina Reijn (Netherlands)
- Lotte Reiniger (Germany-UK)
- Catherine Reitman (Canada, US)
- Revathi (India)
- Shabnam Rezaei (US)
- Shonda Rhimes (US)
- Cloudy Rhodes (Australia)
- Andrea Giles Rich (US)
- Chantal Richard (France)
- Miranda Richardson (UK)
- Patricia Richardson (US)
- Salli Richardson (US)
- Yoruba Richen (US)
- Lisa Rideout (Canada)
- Leni Riefenstahl (Germany)
- Nicole Riegel (US)
- Patricia Riggen (Mexico-US)
- Diana Ringo (Finland)
- Tristan Risk (Canada)
- Marialy Rivas (Chile)
- Joan Rivers
- Chloé Robichaud (Canada)
- Angela Robinson (US)
- Jennifer Kaytin Robinson (US)
- Julie Anne Robinson (UK)
- Melanie Rodriga
- Lina Rodriguez (Canada)
- Rosemary Rodriguez (US)
- Gerry Rogers
- Juliana Rojas
- Sophy Romvari (Canada)
- Bethany Rooney (US)
- Jeanne Roques (aka Musidora) (France)
- Alison E. Rose (Canada)
- Lee Rose (US)
- Sue Rose (US)
- Elizabeth Allen Rosenbaum (US)
- Rose Rosenblatt (US)
- Tatia Rosenthal
- Theola Ross (Canada)
- Tracee Ellis Ross (US)
- Vanessa Roth
- Stephanie Rothman (US)
- Brigitte Roüan (France)
- Candida Royalle
- Patricia Rozema (Canada)
- Catarina Ruivo (Portugal)
- Marisa Ryan (US)
- Marja-Lewis Ryan (US)

== S ==
- Jocelyne Saab (Lebanon)
- Randa Chahal Sabag (Lebanon)
- Lynne Sachs (US)
- Jean Sagal (US)
- Leontine Sagan (Austria-Hungary)
- Michelle St. John (Canada)
- Annie St-Pierre (Canada)
- Marie-Josée Saint-Pierre (Canada)
- Tazuko Sakane (Japan)
- Gabriela Samper (Colombia)
- Helke Sander (Germany)
- Helma Sanders-Brahms (Germany)
- Isabel Sandoval (Philippines)
- Arlene Sanford (US)
- Sangeeta (Pakistan)
- Satarupa Sanyal (India)
- Shamim Sarif (UK)
- Valeria Sarmiento (Chile-France)
- Inoka Sathyangani (Sri Lanka)
- Shimako Satō (Japan)
- Marjane Satrapi (Iran-France)
- Tina Satter (US)
- Brigitte Sauriol (Canada)
- Savitri (India)
- Nancy Savoca (US)
- Lorene Scafaria (US)
- Lone Scherfig (Denmark)
- Suzanne Schiffman (France)
- Greta Schiller (US)
- Jillian Schlesinger (US)
- Roslyn Schwartz (Canada)
- Céline Sciamma (France)
- Jordan Scott (UK)
- Cynthia Scott (Canada)
- Nell Scovell (US)
- Beverly Sebastion (US)
- Lorraine Segato (Canada)
- Susan Seidelman (US)
- Amy Seimetz (US)
- Emma Seligman (Canada)
- Arna Selznick (Canada)
- Yoshiko Sembon (Japan)
- Aparna Sen (India)
- Lorraine Senna (US)
- Amy Serrano (Cuba-US)
- Coline Serreau (France)
- Mary Sexton (Canada)
- Beverly Shaffer (Canada-US)
- Lee Shallat-Chemel (US)
- Meher Afroz Shaon (Bangladesh)
- Kathleen Shannon (Canada)
- Madeline Sharafian (US)
- Jessica Sharzer (US)
- Helen Shaver (Canada-US)
- Tal Shefi (US-Israel)
- Adrienne Shelly (US)
- Angela Shelton (US)
- Lynn Shelton (US)
- Millicent Shelton (US)
- Tali Shemesh (Israel)
- Larisa Shepitko (Soviet Union)
- Kirsten Sheridan (Ireland)
- Amy Sherman-Palladino (US)
- Cindy Sherman (US)
- Domee Shi (Canada)
- Ann Shin (Canada)
- Sofia Shinas (Canada)
- Nell Shipman (Canada)
- Janell Shirtcliff (US)
- Tiffany Shlain (US)
- Tima Shomali (Jordan)
- Cate Shortland (Australia)
- Andrea Shreeman (US)
- Esfir Shub (Soviet Union)
- Mina Shum (Canada)
- Huang Shuqin (China)
- Mrs. Sidney Drew (US)
- Trish Sie (US)
- Evann Siebens (Canada)
- Lois Siegel (Canada)
- Floria Sigismondi (Canada)
- Joan Micklin Silver (US)
- Barbara Simmons (US)
- Carla Simón (Spain)
- Lisa Simon (US)
- Ellen Simpson (Canada)
- Madeleine Sims-Fewer (Canada)
- Anne-Marie Sirois (Canada)
- Thérèse Sita-Bella (Cameroon)
- Kari Skogland (Canada)
- Holly Goldberg Sloan (US)
- Alison Snowden (UK-Canada)
- Helena Solberg (Brazil)
- Yuliya Solntseva (Soviet Union)
- Frances-Anne Solomon (UK-Canada)
- Julia Solomonoff (Argentina)
- Mingmongkol Sonakul (Thailand)
- Celine Song (Canada)
- Safiya Songhai (US)
- Susan Sontag (US)
- Jen and Sylvia Soska (Canada)
- Jane Spencer (US)
- Penelope Spheeris (US)
- Jill Sprecher (US)
- Avigail Sperber (Israel)
- Sylvia Spring (Canada)
- Emily Squires (US)
- Yael Staav (Canada)
- Nicole Stamp (Canada)
- Wendey Stanzler (US)
- Casandra Stark (US)
- Cecile Starr (US)
- J.A. Steel (US)
- Paprika Steen (Denmark)
- Johanna Stein (Canada)
- Susan Steinberg (US)
- Jennifer Steinman (US) (Note: A film by: Desert Runners)
- Katherine Stenholm (US)
- Martha Stephens (US)
- Stella Stevens (US)
- Julie Stewart (Canada)
- Ginny Stikeman (Canada)
- Virginia L. Stone (US)
- Lynne Stopkewich (Canada)
- Brett Story (Canada)
- Barbra Streisand (US)
- Susan Strickler (US)
- Susan Stroman (US)
- Amanda Strong (Canada)
- Vera Stroyeva (Soviet Union)
- Sara Sugarman (UK)
- Sabiha Sumar (Pakistan)
- Vaishnavi Sundar (India)
- Divine Sung (South Korea)
- Elizabeth Sung (Hong Kong)
- Alla Surikova (Russia)
- Mouly Surya (Indonesia)
- Lela Swift (US)
- Brigitte Sy (France)
- Ramata-Toulaye Sy (France)
- Małgorzata Szumowska (Poland)

== T ==
- Elle-Máijá Tailfeathers (Canada)
- Rea Tajiri
- Lisa Takeba (Japan)
- Tanya Talaga (Canada)
- Rachel Talalay (US)
- Shashwati Talukdar
- Bhavna Talwar
- Amber Tamblyn (US)
- Yuki Tanada (Japan)
- Kinuyo Tanaka (Japan)
- Loveleen Tandan
- Cyndi Tang (US)
- Amanda Tapping (Canada-US)
- Nadia Tass (Macedonia)
- Heather Taylor
- Sharine Taylor (Canada)
- Sam Taylor-Wood (UK)
- Julie Taymor (US)
- Sakane Tazuko
- Valeria Bruni Tedeschi (Italy-France)
- Nathalie Teirlinck (Belgium)
- Suzie Templeton
- Angela Tessinari (US)
- Joan Tewkesbury (US)
- Lucy Thane
- Betty Thomas (US)
- Madison Thomas (Canada)
- May Miles Thomas
- Pam Thomas (US)
- Caroline Thompson (US)
- Danièle Thompson (France)
- Jessica M. Thompson (US-Australia)
- Jody Thompson (Canada)
- Lea Thompson (US)
- Ninja Thyberg (Sweden)
- Wendy Tilby (Canada)
- Ondi Timoner (US)
- Victory Tischler-Blue
- Stacy Title (US)
- Kamala Todd (Canada)
- Loretta Todd (Canada)
- Weronika Tofilska (Poland)
- Maria Sole Tognazzi (Italy)
- Pamela Tola (Finland)
- Farkhondeh Torabi
- Gariné Torossian
- Fina Torres (Venezuela)
- Pimpaka Towira (Thailand)
- Sarah Townsend (UK)
- Wendy Toye
- Mouna Traoré (Canada)
- Lindalee Tracey (Canada)
- Jackie Traverse (Canada)
- Margaret (Trudy) Carlile Travis (US)
- Julie Tremble (Canada)
- Monika Treut (Germany)
- Justine Triet (France)
- Nadine Trintignant (France)
- Lexie Findarle Trivundza (US)
- Anne Troake (Canada)
- Fien Troch (Belgium)
- Rose Troche (US)
- Alice Troughton (UK)
- Athina Rachel Tsangari (Greece)
- Susan Tully (UK)
- Marie-Hélène Turcotte (Canada)
- Guinevere Turner (US)
- Aisha Tyler (US)
- Hermína Týrlová (Czechoslovakia)

== U ==
- Liv Ullmann (Norway)
- Sima Urale (New Zealand-Samoa)
- Urszula Urbaniak (Poland)

== V ==
- Esther Valiquette (Canada)
- Agnès Varda (France; born in Belgium)
- Flore Vasseur (France)
- Pam Veasey (US)
- Nicole Védrès (France)
- Ajita Suchitra Veera (India)
- Norma Safford Vela (US)
- Ingrid Veninger (Canada)
- Katherena Vermette (Canada)
- Rhayne Vermette (Canada)
- Chris Vermorcken (Belgium)
- Myriam Verreault (Canada)
- Virginie Verrier (France)
- Sandrine Veysset (France)
- Manuela Viegas (Portugal)
- Teresa Villaverde (Portugal)
- Vidhu Vincent (India)
- Michal Vinik (Israel)
- Bárbara Virgínia (Portugal)
- Wiebke von Carolsfeld (Canada)
- Katja von Garnier (Germany)
- Daisy von Scherler Mayer (US)
- Margarethe von Trotta (Germany)
- Jürgen Vsych (US)
- Johanna Vuoksenmaa (Finland)

== W ==
- Louise Wadley (Australia)
- Kristina Wagenbauer (Canada)
- Maria Wagner (US)
- Sally Wainwright (UK)
- Lucy Walker (UK)
- Mary Walker-Sawka (Canada)
- Nancy Walker (US)
- Amei Wallach (US)
- Dahvi Waller (Canada)
- Aisling Walsh (Ireland)
- Dearbhla Walsh
- Shannon Walsh (Canada)
- Laura Wandel (Belgium)
- Aloha Wanderwell (Canada)
- Lulu Wang (US)
- Nanfu Wang (US)
- Rachel Ward (Australia)
- Sarah Watt (Australia)
- Kim Wayans (US)
- Dreya Weber (US)
- Lois Weber (US)
- Zhao Wei
- Claudia Weill (US)
- Leilah Weinraub (US)
- Andrea Weiss (US)
- Valerie Weiss (US)
- Aerlyn Weissman (Canada)
- Yvonne Welbon (US)
- Audrey Wells (US)
- Charlotte Wells (UK)
- Christine Welsh
- Jiang Wenli (China)
- Lina Wertmüller (Italy)
- Anne Wheeler (Canada)
- Sherry White (Canada)
- Susanna White (UK)
- Roxann Whitebean (Canada)
- Kanchi Wichmann (UK)
- Joyce Wieland (Canada)
- Nettie Wild (Canada)
- Olivia Wilde (US)
- Dawn Wilkinson (Canada)
- Dena Williams (Canada)
- JoBeth Williams (US)
- Tucky Williams (US)
- Georgina Willis (Australia)
- Elisabeth Wilms (Germany)
- Chandra Wilson (US)
- Lois Wilson (US)
- Margery Wilson (US)
- Sandy Wilson (Canada)
- Doris Wishman (US)
- Agnieszka Wojtowicz-Vosloo (US)
- Christie Will Wolf (Canada)
- Mariloup Wolfe (Canada)
- Joyce Wong (Canada)
- Victoria Wood (UK)
- Kate Woods (Australia-US)
- Jacqueline Wright
- Robin Wright (US)
- Alice Wu (US)
- Jane Wu (US-Taiwan)

== X ==
- Xue Xiaolu (China)

== Y ==
- Naoko Yamada (Japan)
- Tizuka Yamasaki (Brazil)
- Chikako Yamashiro (Japan)
- Yūki Yamato (Japan)
- Cathy Yan
- Ruby Yang (China)
- Yong-hi Yang
- Pamela Yates (US)
- Linda Yellen (US)
- Ning Ying (China)
- Suzi Yoonessi
- Yumi Yoshiyuki (Japan)
- Aleysa Young (Canada)
- Heather Young (Canada)
- Byun Young-joo
- Nathalie Younglai (Canada)
- Asia Youngman (Canada)
- Jessica Yu (US)

== Z ==
- Samia Zaman (Bangladesh)
- Sara Zandieh (Iran-US)
- Monica Zanetti (Australia) (Note: A film by: Ellie & Abbie (& Ellie's Dead Aunt))
- Yolande Zauberman (France)
- Jasmila Žbanić (Bosnia/Herzegovina)
- Ona Zee (US)
- Maryanne Zéhil (Canada)
- Mai Zetterling (Sweden)
- Chenyang Zhao (China)
- Chloé Zhao (China-US)
- Zhang Nuanxin (China)
- Binka Zhelyazkova (Bulgaria)
- Lydia Zimmermann (Spain)
- Sanja Živković (Serbia/Canada}
- Magdalena Zyzak (US)

== See also ==
- List of Female Academy Award winners and nominees for non-gendered categories
- List of lesbian filmmakers
- List of LGBT-related films directed by women
- Women's cinema
- List of film and television directors
