= Colombia in My Arms =

2000 Finnish documentary film

- Directed by: Jenni Kivistö; Jussi Rastas
- Produced by: Markku Tuurna
- Cinematography: Jussi Rastas
- Edited by: Jenni Kivistö; Jussi Rastas; Sully Reed; Antti Jääskeläinen
- Music by: Povl Kristian
- Production companies: Filmimaa; Hansen & Pedersen Film og Fjernsyn; Les Films d'un Jour; Medieoperatørene
- Release date: January 31, 2020
- Running time: 91 minutes
- Languages: Spanish, English

Colombia in My Arms is a 2020 documentary film directed by Jenni Kivistö and Jussi Rastas. The film follows the aftermath of the 2016 peace agreement between the Colombian government and the FARC guerrillas, exploring the reactions of various Colombian social groups to the peace accord.

== Synopsis ==
Colombia in My Arms is a documentary that follows the aftermath of the 2016 peace agreement between the Colombian government and the FARC guerrillas, which was supposed to end over 50 years of armed conflict. The film primarily focuses on Ernesto, a FARC ex-combatant, as he navigates the transition from armed resistance to political engagement. The peace accord throws the country into chaos, revealing deep societal polarization.

The documentary presents multiple perspectives from across the social spectrum, including those of FARC guerrillas, right-wing politicians, coca leaf farmers, and the old aristocracy. It does not attempt to explain the conflict directly but instead uses the stories of its characters to explore whether true peace is possible in a deeply divided society.

== Release and reception ==
Colombia in My Arms premiered at the 43rd Göteborg Film Festival in Sweden in February 2020, where it won the Dragon Award for Best Nordic Documentary. The jury praised the film for its curiosity in observing vastly different opposing groups, resulting in a "polyphonic portrait of a country in which peace doesn't seem welcome." The jury highlighted the precise use of photography and editing, which submerges the audience in the contrasting realities of political sensibilities at play in natural and urban environments, as well as poverty and luxury. They noted that the film transcends being just an intimate portrait of a country, and instead prompts reflection on colonialism and post-colonialism, capitalism and anti-capitalism, and what sustains humanity.

The film was well-received across the international film circuit. It was selected for notable international festivals, including the MOSTRA - São Paulo International Film Festival and Havana Film Festival. In addition to the Dragon Award for Best Nordic Documentary, other notable awards include the New Nordic Voice Award at the 31st Nordisk Panorama in Sweden and the Golden Owl for Best feature-length film at the 10th Balneário Camboriú International Film Festival in Brazil. By the end of 2021, Colombia in My Arms had been selected for 32 film festivals and had won 15 awards. According to the Finnish Film Foundation the film became the most widely distributed Finnish feature documentary in 2020.

In Finland, the directors Jenni Kivistö and Jussi Rastas were awarded with the Long Play Journalism Award in December 2021. The film was also distributed theatrically in Paris

== Awards and recognition ==
| Festival | Award | Result | Ref. |
|---|---|---|---|
| Göteborg Film Festival | Dragon Award - Best Nordic Documentary | Won | |
| MOSTRA - São Paulo International Film Festival | New Directors' Competition | Nominated | |
| Nordisk Panorama | New Nordic Voice | Won | |
| Havana Film Festival - Festival Internacional del Nuevo Cine Latinoamericano | Official Selection | | |
| Balneário Camboriú International Film Festival | Golden Owl - Best Feature-length Film | Won | |
| Movies that Matter | Camara Justitia Award | Nominated | |
| Thessaloniki Documentary Festival | Official Selection | | |
| Films From The South | Doc:Award - Best Documentary | Won | |
| Sucre International Human Rights Film Festival | International Eye Award | Won | |
| FIGRA | Special Mention | Won | |
| FIGRA | Prix Aïna Roger Esj Lille | Won | |
| Naples Human Rights Film Festival | Award of the Italian Cinema Federation | Won | |
| Naples Human Rights Film Festival | Human Rights Doc Award | Won | |
| Censurados Film Festival | Best International Feature-length Film | Won | |
| Festival Internacional de Cine - El Cine Suma Paz | Best Feature-length Film / Culture of Peace | Won | |
| HumanDOC | Special Award | Won | |
| MDOC - Melgaco International Documentary Film Festival | Jean Loup Passek Award - Special Mention | Won | |
| Râsnov Film and Histories Festival | Special Mention | Won | |
| Festival Ícaro | Honorific Mention | Won | |
| SEMINCI | Tiempo de Historia | Nominated | |

== Critical reception ==
Colombia in My Arms has garnered acclaim for its storytelling, style and its polyphonic exploration.

European critics, such as Tue Steen Müller, a former director of the European Documentary Network, described the film as "a fine documentary in aesthetics as well as in content", "an impressive documentary far from reportage style" with "a drama as good as any fiction." In a review by Modern Times Review, Nick Holdsworth considers the film as "a sensitive and balanced glimpse into the consequences of Colombia's much-heralded 2016 peace accord, having a dream-like quality, and discussing that healing the divisions will take much, much more than any political agreement". Marta Bałaga from Cineuropa criticized Colombia in My Arms for juggling too many perspectives and disjointed elements.

In Colombia, the film was praised for its respectful and balanced approach. Jerónimo Rivera-Betancur, a Colombian film critic, highlighted the "fluid and aesthetic narrative" and commended the directors for avoiding political pamphletism while presenting multiple perspectives of the conflict. He also praised the filmmakers for crafting a multi-layered narrative that steers clear of simplistic portrayals or propaganda, allowing the film's various voices to emerge authentically. The cinematography and editing were particularly noted for creating an immersive and thought-provoking experience. El País emphasized the film's critical distance, noting that it offers a multifaceted perspective on Colombia's polarized society, and praised the powerful cinematography and engaging narrative structure, with dynamic editing and a captivating soundtrack. The review also acknowledged the directors’ fresh perspective as outsiders, whose detached lens provided a broader view of the country's socio-political landscape. Laura Camila Arévalo Domínguez from El Espectador similarly remarked that the film portrays how individuals are shaped by the circumstances they live in, making it hard to find peace, and encourages viewers to "listen to opinions that have been blocked by indignation."

In Brazil, Luiz Zanin from Rede TVT noted the film's complexity, stating, "It is a film that doesn't cheapen the situation. It is complex. I like cinema that makes me think." Both João Francisco Milani from Outra Hora and Jorge Cruz Jr. from Apostila de Cinema gave positive critiques, both reflecting in depth on the film's content in relation to Latin American history and present day, with Cruz stating, "Colombia in My Arms is an important document on the current panorama of Colombian society." Alike Milani and Cruz, Celso Marconi from Vermelho and film critic Carlos Alberto Mattos appreciate the film, noting that the directors' perspective as foreigners adds a lot to the film.

In Finland, Helsingin Sanomat critic Tero Kartastenpää stated in his review that "the directors made an admirable sacrifice for art and documentary film", regretting the film didn't spark widespread attention in Finland. The Finnish Broadcasting Company indicates in its article that the COVID-19 pandemic affected the distribution in a negative way as the film premiered at the onset of the pandemic.
