= Agnieszka Lukasiak =

Film director based in Los Angeles, Stockholm and London

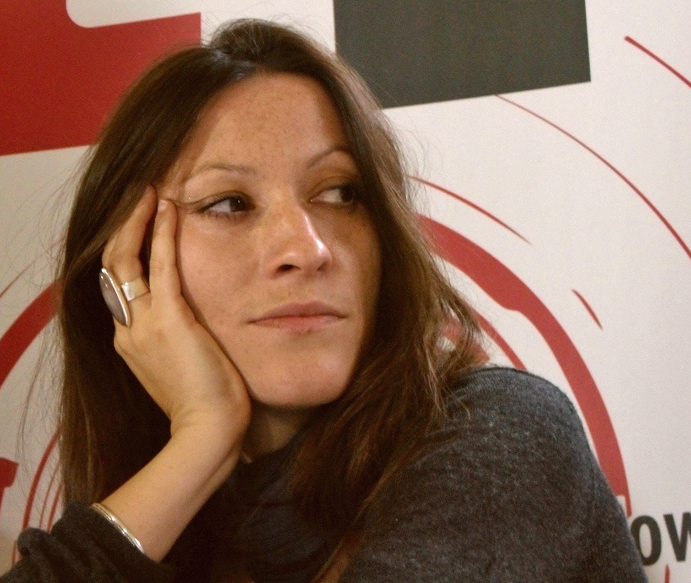
- Lukasiak in April 2011
- Born: 18 December 1984 (age 40); Wrocław, Poland
- Occupation: Director

Agnieszka Lukasiak (born 18 December 1984) is a film director based in Los Angeles, Stockholm and London. She began her career directing cinema-released feature documentaries, and is now directing feature films.

Lukasiak was born in Wrocław, Poland, and came to Sweden with her parents as refugees. She graduated from the directing department of the Polish National Film School in Łódź.

== Filmography ==
Year	Title	Notes
1988	Egzorcysta Pan Skowron	
2000	Murzynek bambo	
2003	Algeria: Drink, Smoke and Love	ASIN: B004YWSJQ2
2003	Algeria: The Nameless War	
2005	Bortglömda	English title: Forgotten
2011	Between Two Fires	
2019	Could this Be You?	
2022	Animal Within.	

Lukasiak's films have been shown at a number of film festivals around the world, including in Kraków (1998); München (1999); Amsterdam, Toronto, Washington, DC (2002); Gothenburg, Kazimierz, Chicago, New York City, Athens, Ljubljana, Stockholm, Thessaloniki, Malmö, Sweden (2003); Oslo (2006); North Carolina, Sofia, Zagreb, Barcelona, Lübeck, Reykjavik, Bucharest (2007); Busan (2010); Edinburgh, Goa, Warsaw, California, Prague, Dortmund, Wrocław, Tróia, Kraków, Murmansk, Ankara, Valladolid, Kaunas, Helsinki, Vienna (2011); Hong Kong, Seoul, Palić, and Göteborg (2012).

== Awards ==
Year	Award/honor	Awarding body	Work	Result	Ref
1998	Best Short Documentary	Kraków Film Festival		Won	
1999	Filmfest München	Best Documentary		Nominated	
2006	Nordic Documentary Award	Nordisk Panorama	Forgotten	Won	
2006	Best Documentary	International Images Film Festival for Women		Won	
2006	Humanitarian Award			Won	
2007	Best Documentary	Trieste Film Festival	Forgotten	Won	
2010	Critics Award	Festiwal Prowincjonalia		Won	
2010	Best Female Lead	Festiwal Prowincjonalia		Won	
2010	Interfilm Church Prize	Lübeck Nordic Film Days	Between Two Fires	Won	
2011	Best Feature	Guldbagge Awards		Nominated	
2011	Press Award	Festiwal Prowincjonalia	Between Two Fires	Won	
2011	Audience Award	Golden Carpathian Ploiesti European Film and Fair		Won	
2011	Young Jury Award	Festiwal Młodzi i Film		Won	
2011	Best Script	Festiwal Młodzi i Film		Won	
2011		Lübeck Nordic Film Days		Won	
