= Faraldo =

Faraldo is a surname. Notable people with the surname include:

- Claude Faraldo (1936–2008), French actor
- Dan-e-o (birthname Daniel Faraldo, born 1977), Canadian hip hop artist
- Danielle Faraldo (born 1966), American filmmaker
- Francesco Faraldo (born 1982), Italian judoka
- Toto Faraldo, dancer of Salon tango
