= Marletta =

Marletta is a surname. Notable people with the surname include:

- Giulia Marletta, Italian-born film producer, television producer, director, and entertainment executive
- Michael Marletta (born 1951), American biochemist

== See also ==
- Marietta (disambiguation)
