= Cloudy Rhodes =

Australian photographer and filmmaker

Cloudy Rhodes is an Australian photographer and filmmaker. Their short film, Lo Loves You, played alongside the American film First Girl I Loved in Australia in 2017. Both films explored LGBT issues. Rhodes has directed a music video for Sonic Youth. The video uses Australian landscape as a backdrop for homoerotic imagery. They are a photographer for Teen Vogue. Rhodes has been profiled for their surfing.

== Personal life ==
Rhodes was born in Palm Beach, Florida, to parents who were both painters, and grew up in Sydney, Australia. Their brother is also a filmmaker. Rhodes is lesbian and uses they/them pronouns.

== See also ==
- List of female film and television directors
- List of lesbian filmmakers
- List of LGBT-related films directed by women
