= Rana Abu Fraihah =

Bedouin-Palestinian documentary filmmaker

Rana Abu Fraiha
- رنا أبو فريحة
- Born: October 8, 1990 (age 35); Tel Sheva, Israel
- Citizenship: Israel
- Occupation: Documentary filmmaker

Rana Abu Fraihah (Arabic: رنا أبو فريحة, Hebrew: רנא אבו פריחה; born October 8, 1990) is an Israeli documentary filmmaker and videographer. Her best-known work is the film In Her Footsteps, which documents her family's story.

== Biography ==
Abu Fraiha was born in Tel Sheva, to Rudaina, an English teacher, and Awda, a transportation engineer. Her father, who is Bedouin, grew up in poverty, and was intended to become a shepherd. Her mother was an Israeli-Arab from the village Jatt in the Triangle area. She is one of five children. Her sister Yasmeen is a physician, social activist and entrepreneur, and her brother Ameer was a math prodigy, and works in the technology sector. Abu Fraiha also competed in mathematics competitions in middle school, and was selected to participate in a Ben Gurion University program for gifted students when she was in the fifth grade.

When she was 5, her family moved to the neighboring Jewish city of Omer, becoming one of the first two Bedouin families there (as of 2019, there are ten). According to Abu Fraiha, both her parents were revolutionary thinkers, and given that their home town had no kindergartens or day care options, the move was a radical solution. Omer was entirely Jewish, mostly Ashkenazi, and very nationalistic. Growing up there was difficult for her. She has said about it: "Today I understand how powerful this duality is. It is actually being able to see on the outside everything that is considered 'normal' and 'right', and at home what is supposed to be avoided. For years I distanced myself from the Arab, the Bedouin, the Palestinian identity. I did not want to speak the language, I was afraid to get near it. Thank God (and especially my film) that I'm not in that place today."

Abu Fraiha studied architecture, and then documentary filmmaking, at Bezalel Academy of Arts and Design. She works as a counselor for the Looking Forward Association, which works to identify outstanding youth from the geographical and social peripheries, and prepare them for higher education in film television and the arts.

== In Her Footsteps ==
While studying for her degree, Abu Fraiha continued to feel unsettled, like she did not belong anywhere, just as she felt in her childhood. She recalls that she would come home feeling angry, and blaming her parents for the choices they made. She began filming her family and everyday aspects of her life as an outlet for her feelings; she did not set out to be a filmmaker, but this activity turned into a deeply significant act for her.

When she was 13, Abu Fraiha's mother was diagnosed with breast cancer, and had been fighting the disease for years. Part of the impetus behind the filming was the knowledge that her mother was terminal, and that documenting her life and family was meaningful. However, the project soon changed its focus, and became a record of Rudaina's struggle to be buried in the town she lived in for over 20 years. In Israel, burial is governed by religious law, leading to strict segregation, and therefore, a Muslim woman cannot be buried in the Omer cemetery. The family's legal and social challenge in the face of Rudaina's death paralleled Abu Fraiha's struggle as a child in this community, of which she was a part, but also a perpetual outsider. The film is therefore also an examination of identity, and choices. "In my family, education was a top priority," says Abu Fraiha, whose father was the first-ever Bedouin engineer in Israel, "and [the move to Omer] was made for this purpose."

The film came out three years after the Rudaina's death. It premiered at the Jerusalem International Film Festival in 2017, where it won the Van Leer Award for best directing. It was then released in cinematheques throughout the country, and was also screened in various venues in the periphery – in Arab and Bedouin communities, and aroused widespread public discourse. The film later won a series of awards, among them the Best Documentary Award at the Berlin Jewish Film Festival, the Shulamit Aloni Prize for Human Rights, and the Ophir Award for Best Documentary.

== Filmography ==
- Zorouni (2014)
- My Land of Israel (student film, 2015)
- In Her Footsteps (2017)

== Awards ==
- 2018 Shulamit Aloni Prize, for In Her Footsteps
- "The Women Who Are Shaking Up Culture" list, Walla!, 2017
- Forbes "30 Under 30" list, 2019

Film Awards
Year	Work	Award	Category	Notes
2014	Zarouni	Aliza Shagrir Foundation	Young documentary filmmaker grant	
2017	In Her Footsteps	Van Leer	Best directing (documentary)	

== See also ==
- List of female film and television directors
