= Justine Bitagoye =

Filmmaker from Burundi

- Occupations: Film director, journalist
- Notable work: Rwagasore: vie, combat espoir

Justine Bitagoye is a Burundian journalist, film producer, screenwriter, and film director.

== Biography ==
Bitagoye is an independent filmmaker from Burundi, who works as a journalist for the National Television and Radio Broadcast Authority. She has a BA in history from the National University of Burundi, and an MA in environmental journalism from Karera University in Uganda.

== Filmography ==
Moussa (2005)

Documentary film; Bitagoye's first collaboration with Gaudiose Nininahazwe.

Mieux vaut mal vivre que mourir (2006)

Documentary film, created and directed with Burundian filmmaker Gaudiose Nininahazwe. The film follows the lives of people living in a city garbage dump, surviving on what they scavenge there. They live a difficult, sometimes violent, life.

The film was chosen for screening at festivals around the world, and received a special commendation at FESPACO and at the Monte Carlo International Film Festival.

Kazubaː le soleil se lève (2008)

Documentary film about Sybil Anita, who grew up as an orphan in rural Burundi. At age 11, she began participating in singing competitions, and eventually became an international artist, performing in multiple languages. She is also an activist for women's rights, and political reconciliation.

Rwagasoreː vie, combat, espoir (2012)

Biographical documentary, directed by Bitagoye and Pascal Capitolin.

The film was released in honor of the 50th anniversary of Burundi's independence, and tells the story of the man who became a symbol of the struggle against colonialism – Prince Louis Rwagasore, who the son of King Mwambutsa IV Bangilisenge. During his short political life, he gathered around him militant support for his vision: Complete liberation from Belgian colonization. in 1961, in Burundi's first free elections, his party, Union for National Progress (UPRONA), came out on top, and he was elected as prime minister. However, only a few days after he established his government, he was assassinated, on 13 October 1961, and did not live to see the day his country finally declared independence, on 1 July 1962.

The film is based mostly on personal witness accounts, as very little documentary footage exists about this leader of Burundi independence.

The film was selected for screening at many international film festivals, including:

- Afrika Filmfestival 2013
- AfricAvenir presents: "African Perspectives"
- Rwanda Film Festival 2013
- Jenseits von Europa XIII
- Au-delà de l'Europe
- Cologne African Film Festival 2014
- Afrika Filmfestival 2014
- Les mardis de Mémoires du Congo 2017

The film was also a finalist in the International Radio and Television Union (URTI) competition.

== See also ==
- List of female film and television directors
- IMDb
