= Grandmother (1922 film) =

1922 film

- Directed by: Thea Červenková
- Based on: Grandmother by Božena Němcová
- Starring: Ludmila Innemannová; Růžena Maturová
- Cinematography: Josef Brabec
- Production company: Filmový ústav
- Distributed by: Iris-Film
- Release date: 24 February 1922
- Country: Czechoslovakia
- Language: Czech

Grandmother (Czech: Babička) is a 1922 Czech drama film directed by Thea Červenková.

== Cast ==
- Ludmila Innemannová as Grandmother
- Anna Vaicová-Brabcová as Viktorka
- Růžena Maturová as Viktorka's mother
- Vojtěch Záhořík as Viktorka's father/Gamekeeper Beyer
- Liduška Innemannová as Barunka Prošková
- Josef Vraný as Gamekeeper
- Jiřina Janderová as Countess Kateřina Vilemína Zaháňská
- František Smolík as Emperor Josef II.
- Milada Smolíková as Grandmother (young)
- Arnošta Záhoříková as Beyer's wife
- Anči Jelínková as Kristla
