= Kanchi Wichmann =

British filmmaker (born 1974)

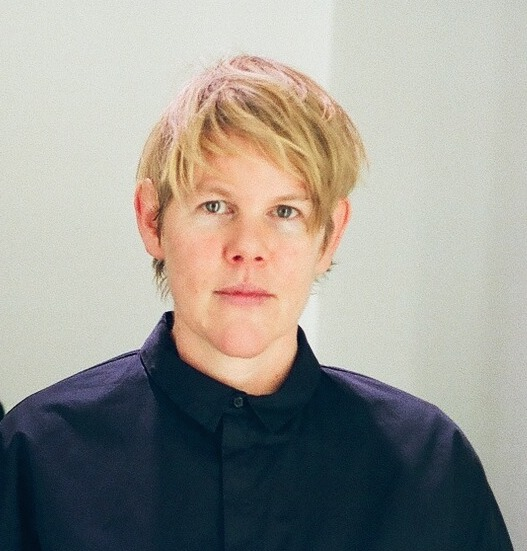
Kanchi Wichmann in 2016

Kanchi Wichmann (born 1974) is a British filmmaker, best known for the lesbian feature Break My Fall (2011), which was listed as one of ten great lesbian films to watch by the British Film Institute.

== Life and career ==
Wichmann was born in North Devon, to an English (Yorkshire) mother and a German father. She moved around in her childhood, settling in London at the age of 17. Her training including an HND in film and video at the Surrey Institute of Art and Design and TV & Video production, City & Guilds at the College of North East London, Tottenham.

At 18, Wichmann began making films using video and Super 8. She made her first 16mm narrative short film at the age of twenty-one (Travelling Light). Her first feature film, Break My Fall, was set in Hackney and released by Peccadillo Pictures in 2011. The film was distributed in over twenty territories worldwide via Paris-based sales agent Reel Suspects. As well as writing and directing her own films, she has worked in many film-related jobs, including film festivals, cinemas, and for other director,s most notably in the production office of the German director Ulrike Ottinger for her film Chamisso's Shadow (2015).

In 2016, Wichmann wrote an article that was published in the London-based feminist film journal Another Gaze, called Lesbian Films Don't Make Money. The article detailed Wichmann's struggle to raise finance on her second feature, which also featured a lesbian protagonist.

In 2017, Wichmann wrote and directed a ten-episode web series set in the Berlin queer scene called Mixed Messages, which was edited by LA-based filmmaker Cary Cronenwett and was released by Peccadillo Pictures.

As of 2014, Wichmann resides in Berlin, Germany.

== Filmography ==
- On Standby (2020)
- Vanilla (Das Musical) (2019)
- Mixed Messages (2017)
- Break My Fall (2011)
- I Don't Exist (2004)
- Travelling Light (1999)

== See also ==
- List of female film and television directors
- List of LGBT-related films directed by women
