= Helena Lumbreras =

Spanish filmmaker and screenwriter

Helena Lumbreras (Cuenca, 1935 - Barcelona, 1995) was a Spanish film director and screenwriter. She co-founded Colectivo Cine de Clase.

== Filmography ==
- España (1964)
- España 68 (1968)
- El cuarto poder (1970)
- El campo para el hombre (1975)
- O todos o ninguno (1976)
- A la vuelta del grito (1977)

== See also ==
- Cinema of Spain
- List of female film and television directors
