= Thea Červenková =

Czech film director and screenwriter

- Born: Terezie Císařová; 17 May 1878; Prague, Austria-Hungary
- Died: 1957 or 1961 (aged 78-83); São Paulo, Brazil
- Occupations: Film director, screenwriter, film producer, film actress, journalist
- Years active: 1918–1923

Terezie Císařová, known as Thea (or Tea) Červenková (17 May 1878 – 1957 or 1961), was a Czech film director, screenwriter, journalist, writer and actress. She was the second Czechoslovak woman film director (the first one is considered to be Olga Rautenkranzová).

During her short film career in Czechoslovakia (1918–1923), Červenková occupied several professions — she translated continuity intertitles, wrote eight scripts, directed eight movies, four of which were produced by her own company Filmový ústav, and wrote articles for the pioneering trade film magazine Československý film. She was known as the "lady crazy about the film".

== Early life ==
Thea Červenková was born to a butcher's family living on Klicperova (Záhřebská) Street in Vinohrady in Prague. It is assumed that she studied abroad, possibly at director Max Reinhardt's. There is no other extant evidence of her youth, connected to her private or professional life.

== Career ==
At first, Červenková was interested in literary work. She worked for a theatre, and she dramatized literary artworks, for example, her dramatization of the novel Hřích paní Hýrové by Václav Štech was performed by Prague theatre Uranie in 1915. She wrote also a memory book, Toulky moravským Slovenskem, in 1917.

The sources differ about the fact, when and how Červenková entered the film business. One version says that she shot together with her later frequent co-worker cinematographer Josef Brabec (1890–1977) a movie Láska a dřeváky (Love and Wooden Shoes) as early as 1914. But the movie is not preserved and the director has credited only Josef Brabec. Another version is that Červenková and Josef Brabec founded together the film company Slavia in June 1918.

After the coup for Czechoslovak independence in October 1918, Červenková sold Slavia to the Austrian firm Sascha-Film but remained being director of the company. The most probable version (according to Brabec's words) is that Červenková got her first job in the film business in Pragafilm company as a scriptwriter and editor of subtitles. There she met Brabec, who also worked for the company. After the 1918 coup, the branch was renamed to Slaviafilm. At that time, Slaviafilm operated in the film market as a film distributor, but soon it became also a film production company. Červenková helped initiate this change and became responsible for directing and scriptwriting.

=== Slaviafilm period ===
Shortly before the outbreak of the coup, Červenková wrote for Slaviafilm her first script according to the story by Jaroslav Kruis to a short movie Lásko třikrát svatá (Love Sacred Three Times, dir. Karel M. Klos, 1918). Immediately after the coup, she was accused of unpatriotic behavior by the press because of shooting the coup in the streets of Prague for purposes of the Austrian company. Her first movie as a director was a short film comedy Náměsíčný (Sleepwalker, 1919). After that, she wrote a story and script to comedy Ada se učí jezdit (Ada Learns to Drive, dir. Ada Karlovský, 1919). In the same year she directed further short comedies or grotesques: Monarchistické spiknutí (The Monarchist Conspiracy), Zloděj (The Thief) and Byl první máj (On the First of May). Zloděj and Byl první máj are the only Červenková's extant films from this period. In Zloděj Červenková also played a small role of a housemaid who was drugged by Baron, whose intention was to have free access to her landlady.

=== Červenková as a journalist ===
During the years 1919–1920 Červenková contributed to trade film magazine Československý film, for example Film, jeho význam a národnost (Film, Its Meaning and Nationality), Naše filmová dramaturgie (Our Film Dramaturgy), Prvá československá soutěž na domácí libreta (The First Czechoslovak Competition on National Librettos). In her articles is obvious ambition for increase the level of Czechoslovak film. She realized how important cinema could be for a nation: “Film is a deep well of knowledge, the film will become more influential than the press, the film is an art which mustn’t be profaned by flag-waving or turned into a cash cow… But the film is also a national credo, a declaration… and this mustn’t be forgotten.”

=== Filmový Ústav period ===
Conviction of the value of the film as art and the need for the development of "higher artistic film that would be an adaptation of valuable literary works" led to the establishment of Filmový ústav. Filmový ústav was founded by Červenková and Brabec in the second half of 1919 after they left Slaviafilm. It is possible that it was caused also by the change of Slaviafilm only to a distribution company. Filmový ústav was a family-character production company. Červenková built a workshop, studio and laboratory in her family house in Vinohrady, In the backyard of the house were shot interiors of her movies. Červenková and Brabec did not have a commercial plan with their company, they only wanted to earn money for their next movies. Filmový ústav produced Červenková's films: Babička (The Grandmother, 1921), Košile šťastného člověka (Happy Man Shirt, 1921), Ty petřínské stráně/ Bludička (The Slopes of Petřín, 1922) and Paličova dcéra (The Arsonist's Daughter, 1923). The company stood also behind documentaries about national figures and cultural features, for example Havlíček, jeho život a literární význam (Havlíček, His Life and Significance in Literature) and Křest sv. Vladimíra (Baptism of St. Vladimír). Most of the documentaries were shot by Červenková. In Filmový ústav debuted also directors J.T. Shaw (Rytíř bledé růže/ Knight of Light Rose, 1921) and Václav Wasserman (Kam s ním?/ Where to with Him?, 1922).

The most important Červenková's movie was Babička. It was the first film adaptation of a popular Czech literary classic by Božena Němcová. But Červenková's movies were not popular, neither commercially nor among critics. She was criticized mainly because of fast and low-budget production and lack of film education. But Červenková's contribution to the early Czechoslovak film business is obvious – at first, as the journalist who enforced the perception of moviemaking as part of creating a national identity and also was one of the pioneers who adapted literary and theatre works for movies. From this period are two movies extant: Babička and Pavličova dcéra.

Filmový ústav finished its activities because of the economic crisis in 1923. Červenková left for Brazil with her brothers. Since then, there is no evidence about her life and activities, either about her only son. She died in São Paulo in Brazil in 1961 (or in 1957, as some sources state).

== Filmography ==
As director:

- Paličova dcera (1923) (writer, director)
- Ty petřínské stráně (1922) (writer only)
- Babička (1921) (director only)
- Košile šťastného člověka (1921) (writer, director)
- Monarchistické spiknutí (1919) (director only)
- Náměsíčný (1919) (director only)
- Byl první máj (1919) (writer, director)
- Zloděj (1919) (writer, director, actress)
- Ada se učí jezdit (1919) (writer only)
- Lásko třikrát svatá (1918) (writer only)
