= Elisabeth Wilms =

German filmmaker (1905–1981)

Elisabeth Wilms was a German filmmaker born on July 22, 1905, in Lengerich, Westphalia. She filmed and edited several documentaries in Germany during and after World War II. She died on August 25, 1981, in Dortmund.

== Early life ==
Wilms grew up in Lengerich, Westphalia as the daughter of a butcher who ran a small sausage factory. She later moved to Dortmund in 1931 where she married Erich Wilms and helped him run his bakery. In 1941, she happened to see a neighbor screening an amateur 8 mm film and was fascinated by the technology. “It was completely new to me that you could make films yourself,” Wilms would later say about this occasion, “Before that, I seldom took photos, and when I did, I took insignificant pictures. I felt as if I was now close to fulfilling my most secret desires.” She then joined a film club in Dortmund where she quickly learned how to make her own 8 mm films.

== Career ==
In total, Wilms made over 150 short films from her discovery of filmmaking in 1943 until her death in 1981.

After Dortmund was devastated by a bombing run from Allied forces in 1944, Wilms filmed the aftermath, showing the destroyed streets and the distraught families in one of her most well-known documentaries, Alltag nach dem Krieg. These recordings were compiled by the Evangelical Relief Corporation and sent abroad to collect donations and care packages for Dortmund.

Her filmography also covered topics of reconstruction; such as Dortmunds neue Westfalenhalle, a documentary which covered the construction of the new Westfalenhallen in 1952 after it was previously destroyed during World War II.

Later in her career, Wilms would also be commissioned to make television advertisements, such as Flirt mit einer Maschine, a 10-minute advertisement for the new Constructa washing machine.

== Filmography ==
- Pumpernickel - 1942
- Der Weihnachtsbäcker - 1943
- Alltag nach dem Krieg - 1948
- Dortmunds neue Westfalenhalle - 1952
- Durch das Sonnenland Italien - 1955
- Flirt mit einer Maschine - 1955

== Legacy ==
For her work providing footage of the war in Alltag nach dem Krieg, Wilms received the Federal Cross of Merit in 1964

In 1980, Wilms and Erich participated in a documentary film by Jürgen Karl Klauß and Michael Lentz titled Brot und Filme - Das große Hobby der Elisabeth Wilms, where she provides retrospective commentary for some of her earlier films.

Her collection of films was transferred to the Westphalian State Museum of Art and Cultural History film archive in 2007.

== Bibliography ==
- Bredenbrock, Claus; Wilms, Elisabeth; Jakob, Volker (2011), Erich, lass mal laufen! Die Filme der Elisabeth Wilms (in German), Münster, ISBN 978-3-939974-16-1, OCLC 809187314

== See also ==
- List of female film and television directors
