= Mieux vaut mal vivre que mourir =

- Directed by: Justine Bitagoye, Gaudiose Nininahazwe
- Screenplay by: Gloriose Mbazumutima
- Produced by: RTNB
- Cinematography: Anatole Habonimana
- Edited by: Françoise Nzohabonayo, Cédric Nkurunziza
- Release date: 2007
- Running time: 52 minutes 26 minutes (internationally distributed version)
- Countries: Belgium; Burundi

Mieux vaut mal vivre que mourir (in English: "Almost Nothing Is Better Than Nothing At All") is a 2007 documentary film, directed by Justine Bitagoye and Gaudiose Nininahazwe. The literal translation of the film's title is "It is better to live badly than to die".

== Synopsis ==
The daily life of a young boy who lives off the dump, like all those surrounding him. This is the place he grew up in, that fed him and where he finds the articles he sells to survive. This film tenderly recounts the harsh and humble life of dump dwellers.

== Production and release ==
The film is a Belgium-Benin co-production, and the first collaboration between the co-directors Bitagoye and Nininahazwe. It was released in 2006 following a production workshop in which the two took part.

Mieux vaut mal vivre que mourir was screened at multiple international film festivals, including:

- 2008 Monte Carlo Television Festival - Special mention
- 2007 Leuven Afrika Film Festival - non competitive
- 2007 Afrique Taille XL - non competitive (Brussels)
- FESPACO 2007 - Special mention (Ouagadougou)
- African Film Festival of Cordoba-FCAT
- Festival de Cine Africano de Tarifa-Tánger
- Festival International du Film de Ouidah (Bénin)
- Festival de Musique, Esperanzah! ( "Cameras Sud") (Belgium)
- Afrikazabaldu
- Quintessence 2008

The film was included in the short film collection from East Africa, Short(s) of Africa - East African Shorts, release in 2010.
