= In Her Footsteps =

2017 documentary film directed by Rana Abu Fraihah

- אחרייך وَرائكِ
- Directed by: Rana Abu Fraihah
- Produced by: Ibtisam Mara'ana
- Release date: July 2017
- Running time: 70 minutes
- Country: Israel

In Her Footsteps (Arabic: وَرائكِ; Hebrew: אחרייך) is a 2017 documentary film by Israel-Arab director Rana Abu Fraihah, her first full-length work. The film was produced by Ibtisam Mara'ana.

== Synopsis ==
The film follows the story of Abu Fraihah's family, beginning and ending with the death of her mother, Rudainah. Events in the family's life from the 1980s are reenacted, showing Rudainah as a young woman from the Palestinian village Gath, in the Triangle area, who falls in love with Awda, a Bedouin from the south, and marries him, against her family's wishes. She moves to his hometown, Tel Sheva, which quickly becomes a prison for her - a place where women cannot go out unaccompanied, not even to the corner store.

Seeking a better life for her children, Rudainah and Awda move with their five children to Omer, the nearby Jewish town. Omer is entirely Jewish, mostly Ashkenazi, affluent, and very nationalistic; as opposed to Tel Sheva, which is township created by the Israeli government to force Bedouins to settle in permanent locations and is very poor. Abu Fraihah's family was one of two Bedouin families to move to Omer in a sort of social experiment. As a result, the children gained the same education as the Jewish children, spoke fluent Hebrew, and socialized with Jewish children - growing further and further from their roots.

Everything changes, however, when Rudainah is diagnosed with breast cancer. On her deathbed, she asks to be buried in the town she has lived in for decades but is faced with the religious bureaucracy that handles issues of burial in Israel and does not permit non-Jews to be buried in the local cemetery. Her children prefer to bury her in her birthplace, Gath, while her husband, Awda, wants to bury her in his hometown, Tel Sheva. Upon Rudainah's death, each one of them continues upon their separate ways.

== Production ==
In Her Footsteps was filmed over six years of the family's life. It was funded in part by the New Fund for Cinema and Television and YesDocu, and premiered at the Jerusalem Film Festival in July 2017.

== Critical reception ==
Tsipora Roman called the film "moving" and "fascinating". Rutha Koppfer emphasized how the film provides a rare glimpse into the inner workings of this non-hegemonic family. In her feature - part of a project where leading women in Israel pick other women to highlight - Abu Fraihah was chosen by activist and filmmaker Daphne Leef, "for her bravery in being willing to expose herself, in spite of the price she would pay." Ofra Ofer Oren found Rudaina "captivating", and wrote that her fierceness, humor and great love are exposed over and over in the film. She states that the burial issue is "of course, symbolic", and that the film is really about the many conflicts and issues facing this Arab family in Jewish society.

Maariv critic Doron Brosh wrote "'In Her Footsteps' is a fabulous film and I recommend you not miss it". Haaretz's Nirit Enderman called the film "unsettling", and remarked upon the irony of the brave feminist mother who dared to challenge social expectations in order to guarantee a better future for her children, only to "sentence them unwittingly to life in the shadow of a confusing, persistent and painful identity crisis." Rogel Alper called the film "remarkable", "sophisticated" and "suspensful". Analyzing the film, he concludes: "The [Abu Fraihaha] children are a challenge to the Israeli tribal and racist mentality. Not Arabs and not Jews, and certainly not Bedouins. These are Israelis. And so, they were condemned to live as outsiders. After all, even the Supreme Court ruled that the existence of an "Israeli" nationality had not yet been proven. The Abu Fraihaha family is the proof."

== Awards ==
Year	Award	Category	Result
2017	Jerusalem Film Festival	Van Leer Award - Best Documentary	Won
2018	Israeli Documentary Film Awards	Best Documentary	Nominated
2018	Berlin Jewish Film Festival	Best Director	Won
2018	Brandenberg Jewish Film Festival	Best Director	Won
2018	Awards of the Israeli Film Academy (Ophir Award)	Best Documentary	Nominated
