= Rosemarie Hickson =

American film director

Rosemarie Hickson was one of the first American women film editors and directors of documentary, educational, and industrial films.

== Biography ==
In 1952, Hickson was named head of the TV Film Production Department of Sterling Television Co. Her former affiliations were 20th Century-Fox, Caravel Productions (as supervisor of TV film production department), and the US State Department. Hickson became a film editor at Robert Lawrence Productions after serving in a variety of production jobs in the motion picture industry. In 1957, she noted that "Out of some 650 film editors n New York. close to one-third are women." Despite the relative obscurity nowadays of women editors during the 1930s and 1940s including Hickson, they played an important role in American filmmaking.

Hickson served as Secretary and on the Executive Board of the Motion Pictures Film Editors IATSE NY local in the 1940s.

== Filmography ==
- Caravans of Trade (1947), as editor, a 20th Century-Fox Production as part of the Our Land and People series, narrated by Nelson Case
- City Week End (1947), as editor, a 20th Century-Fox Production, narrated by Nelson Case
- Conservation Road (1947), as editor, a 20th Century-Fox Production, narrated by Nelson Case
- Land of Enchantment: Southwest USA (1948), as editor, an Affiliated Film production part of the American Scene series and was distributed by the Office of War Information (State Department)
- The Walking Machine (1949), as editor, for the American Foot Care Inc, narrated by Albert Grobe
- The Life of Christ (1950?), as photographer, produced by Atlantic Productions
- Union at work: this is TWUA (1950), as co-director with Lawrence Rogin, about the Textile Workers Union of America and narrated by Joseph Julian
- Mooney vs. Fowle (1961), as editor (under name Rosemary Hickson?), produced by Robert Drew, about the state high school football championship held at the Orange Bowl in Miami
