= Melanie La Rosa =

American filmmaker

Academic work
- Discipline: Film
- Institutions: Pace University

Melanie La Rosa is an American filmmaker and is currently a professor at Pace University in New York City. Her cinematic work has primarily opted for a documentarian approach that promotes social activism. Many of her films have been met with critical acclaim and applause at human rights festivals and organizations. La Rosa is currently working on her third feature-length documentary entitled Greenbreakers: How to Power a City. Her two previous films depict LGBT and women's rights issues in lieu of the misrepresentation of these figures.

== Education and early film experience ==
La Rosa has attained degrees from Temple University and the University of Michigan where she studied both film and politics. Following the completion of her studies she embedded herself within a number of social groups acting as a frontierswoman for social change. Her advocacy of contemporary issues during this time foreshadows her future work as a documentarian. It was in 1996 when she entered the film industry working mostly behind the scenes and garnering experience for her coming film endeavours. She has worked as a camerawoman, editor, and producer.

== Sir: Just a Normal Guy ==
La Rosa made her directorial debut in 2001 with "Sir: Just a Normal Guy" where she explored LGBT rights. Her film depicts transgender issues as she documents the transitional period of the female-to-male procedure and the search for social acceptance. As she follows Jay Snyder through the transformative phase and his assimilation into society. La Rosa documents Snyder as he searches for acceptance and personal identity. Her cinematic portrayal of Snyder's incredible endeavour evokes themes of identity and belonging that are recurrent within La Rosa's filmography.

"Sir: Just a Normal Guy" has premiered at a number of film festivals and LGBT rallies including OUTrageous: Santa Barbara LBGT Film Festival, IndieFest: The San Francisco Independent Film Festival, and TrannyFest San Francisco. The film has also been exhibited on a global scale and has received accolades for its activist undercurrents and its thoughtful representation of transgender issues.

== The Poetry Deal: A Film with Diane di Prima ==
Following the success of her inaugural film, for her sophomore effort La Rosa sought to inform audiences of the influential career of beatnik poet, Diane di Prima. La Rosa found herself enamoured and enveloped within di Prima's memoir, Recollections of My Life as a Woman. She believed it necessary that di Prima's journey and influence be documented for contemporary viewers unaware of the poet's story. Through her interest in di Prima's career, she was able to gain the artist's acquaintance in 2003 and the two agreed to collaborate on The Poetry Deal.

For her second film, La Rosa engages in the importance of proper representation for women who have acted as pioneers for the furthering of women's rights and advocates for gender equality. The film has received awards from the Michigan Womyn's Music Festival.

== Filmography ==
=== Film ===
Year	Title	Role	Notes
2001	Sir: Just a Normal Guy	Director	Short film
2007	Silent Choices	Cinematographer	
2008	America's Shadows: HIV Risk in Black & Latino Youth	Cinematographer	
2011	The Poetry Deal: A Film with Diane di Prima	Director; cinematographer	Short film
2018	Solar Libre: Family Affair	Director; editor	Short film
2019	How to Power A City: Highland Park	Director; editor	Short film
2024	How to Power A City	Director; producer; editor	
