= Gabriela Samper =

Colombian filmmaker

- Born: Gabriela Samper García; 31 March 1918; Bogotá, Colombia
- Died: 16 May 1974 (aged 56); Bogotá, Colombia
- Occupations: educator, theater producer, filmmaker
- Years active: 1941–1974

Gabriela Samper (31 March 1918 – 16 May 1974) was a Colombian teacher, puppet theater creator and documentary filmmaker. The first woman to participate in documentary filmmaking, she is remembered for her ethnographic short films which explored the diversity of Colombian culture. Winning numerous awards, her work is part of the collection of the Latin American Film Archive at the MOMA in Manhattan.

== Early life ==
Gabriela Samper García was born on 31 March 1918 in Bogotá, Colombia to Saturia García Alvarez and Pedro Miguel Samper Madrid. Her father was an attorney, originally from Madrid. From a well-to-do family, she was educated at home by her mother and maternal grandmother, Saturia Alvarez de García, who had trained in pedagogy. She also had lessons from Elizabeth Birmingham, her Irish governess. In 1928, she enrolled at the Gimnasio Femenino (Women's Gymnasium) in Bogotá, graduating in 1936. She traveled throughout Europe before enrolling in Columbia University in New York City to study English literature and take dance courses with Martha Graham. Later she enrolled in dance classes at the Bodenwiser Academy and lived in Trinidad, before returning to Colombia and enrolling in the National University of Colombia, studying philosophy and letters.

== Career ==
In 1941, Samper received her professorship and married Ulric de Verteuil. She began her career as a teacher of dance, English, and history at the Universidad de los Andes and the Free University of Colombia. During La Violencia, the period between 1948 and 1958 marked by dictatorship and violence in Colombia, Samper was actively involved in the political movements opposed to the conflict and civil unrest. In 1958, she joined the Grupo del Búho, a theater group, and was involved in producing works at the Open Air Theater "La Media Torta", the Teatro Colón and the Teatro Cultural. She directed performances at the Teatro El Burrito in 1960 and three years later was appointed director of the Cultural Theater of the National Park. In the early years of her career, Samper was involved in children's theater and puppetry, which is what she is most remembered for in her home country. She produce television shows and participated in dance and literary works before turning to film making in 1963.

With her third husband, Ray Witlin, Samper founded Cinta Limited, a film production company and the couple made documentary and publicity films in Colombia and the United States. Initially the two produced commercials, but in 1965, Samper wrote and directed El páramo de Cumanday (The Heights of Cumanday), a 22-minute film retelling a Colombian legend shot in the high Andes, as her first artistic film. It explored the fears and struggles of muleteers, fight against the elements and environment. El páramo de Cumanday won the third prize for short films in the 1965 Festival of Puerto Rico. Her ethnographic shorts, focus on the cultural diversity of Colombia. Her Historia de muchos años (History of Many Years, 1965) and Qué es Intercol (What is Intercol, 1965), respectively won the Catalina de Oro and a Gold Mention at the VII Festival of Cartagena. She made two films in the United States in 1967, Una máscara para ti, una máscara para mí (A Mask for You, a Mask for Me) and Ciudades en crisis ¿qué pasa? (Cities in Crisis, What’s Happening?).

Returning to Colombia, in 1969, Samper produced three films: Festival folclórico de Fomenque (Fomenque Folk Festival), Los santísimos hermanos (The Brotherhood of the Most Hoy), and El hombre de la sal (The Salt Maker). Los santísimos hermanos explores a religious sect which arose in the 1960s in the mountains of the Tolima Department, who reacted to the era's violence by withdrawing and seeking peace through penance. The documentary is preserved in the Museum of Modern Art's Latin American Film Archive in Manhattan. El hombre de la sal was an exploration by Samper of the conflict between traditional artistry and technology. The film won recognition at the Festival de Valencia in Valencia, Venezuela and took the Cruz de Málta at the First Latin American Film Festival in Córdoba, Argentina.

In 1972, while working as the director of cultural distribution at the Agustín Codazzi Institute, Samper was arrested and charged as a member of the National Liberation Army. Undergoing both physical and psychological torture, she was released after five months in prison, because of a lack of evidence. Leaving the country, she spent the next year and a half studying at Cornell University.

== Death and legacy ==
Diagnosed with cancer Samper died on 16 May 1974 in Bogotá. She is seen as one of the pioneering women in Colombian film production, as her ethnographic works inspired Marta Rodríguez, Jorge Silva and Gloria Triana to make films on marginalized populations in Colombia and document cultural traditions. Posthumously, a collection of her short stories, La Guandoca, which relates her experiences as a political prisoner was published. In 2009, the Aurelio Arturo Auditorium of the National Library hosted a cinematographic exhibition of the works of Gabriela and her daughter Mady, also a filmmaker. In 2014, Albeiro Pérez directed a performance at the Pequeño Teatro of Gilberto Martínez's adaptation of La Guandoca for the stage.
