= Lübeck Nordic Film Days =

The Lübeck Nordic Film Days (German: Nordische Filmtage Lübeck) is a film festival for movies from the Nordic and Baltic countries held annually in Lübeck, Germany, since 1956 on the first weekend in November. It is the only festival in Germany, and the only one in Europe apart from the Rouen Nordic Film Festival founded in Rouen, France, which is entirely devoted to the presentation of films from the North and Northeast of Europe. Thus is the most important festival for films from Scandinavia and the Baltic countries outside Scandinavia. The festival also presents films made in the state of Schleswig-Holstein in northern Germany.

Feature films, documentaries and short films from Denmark, Estonia, Finland, Iceland, Latvia, Lithuania, Norway and Sweden are presented at this five-day event every year at the beginning of November. In addition, there is an extensive children's and youth film programme and a retrospective devoted to important eras, specific genres or famous persons of film history. Accompanying the film programme are seminars, discussions and roundtable talks.

The Nordic Film Days Lübeck is both an audience festival and an important meeting place for the film industry in Germany and northern Europe. Many directors whose debut works were presented in Lübeck have gone on to earn fame around the world - such as Bille August, Lasse Hallström, Aki Kaurismäki or Fridrik Thór Fridriksson.

In October 2025, it was announced that Hanna Reifgerst will become the artistic director of the Nordic Film Days Lübeck, succeeding Thomas Hailer, who has held the position since 2021 and will step down at the end of March 2025.

The Nordic Film Days Lübeck is put on by the Hanseatic City of Lübeck in cooperation with the film institutes and foundations of Scandinavia as well as the corresponding film institutions in the Baltic countries. Patrons of the festival are the ambassadors of the Nordic countries in Germany. Honorary President is the Norwegian actress and film director Liv Ullmann. Media partner is the television and radio broadcaster Norddeutscher Rundfunk (NDR).
