= Emilia Mosquito =

Swedish film director

Emilia Mosquito, born January 25, 1982, in Stockholm is a Swedish film director whose short films have made headlines due to their often political and or ideological content. Cage Sickness was awarded for best documentary short at the New York Short 2008 – Expeditions in Film.

During 2009 she was working with artists in Stockholm and New York City in connection with a documentary project, The Main Stream [sic], which was finished in late 2010 and was awarded for best up comer at the Detroit Views 2011 Film Festival. Emilia Mosquito is currently finishing up a degree in law at the University of Stockholm.

== Selective filmography ==
- 2007: Cage Sickness
- 2008: Take Me Home
- 2009: Edgar Allan Poe's Never Bet the Devil Your Head
- 2010: The Main Stream [sic]

== Sources ==
- Internet Movie Database
- Sveriges Regissörer
- Svensk Filmdatabas
