= Paula Kehoe =

Irish-Australian film director

- Born: 1964 (age 61–62)
- Occupations: Producer, director, screenwriter, artist
- Website: paulamkehoe.com

Paula Kehoe (born 1964) is an Irish-Australian independent producer, director, and screenwriter from Naarm, Melbourne, working under her independent production company Saoi Media in Galway. She is a member of both the Screen Director's Guild Ireland and the Australian Director's Guild.

== Career ==
Kehoe is an Australian-born producer predominantly interested in social justice, the environment, native cultures, and pro-peace activism. Initially educated at RMIT University, Melbourne, she moved to Ireland and was additionally educated at The University of Galway. Her I Am Galway 2020 was Ireland's first filmpoem created with VR 360 software for an immersive experience.

Her artistic works explore cultural histories from minority voices. Assimilation received a few weeks of set filming in Australia and is a documentary about Aboriginal and Irish stories in Australia. With a particular focus on Irish history, Kehoe's An Diabhal Inti (The Devil's In Her) tells stories on witchcraft, nature, and the female experience. Debuted on International Women's Day 2022, the series "subtly interrogates and undermines" classic tropes about women and witches. In the same year Kehoe produced Cathair Na Mílte Grian (City of a Thousand Suns) to address the impacts of war. Inspired by Irish poetry, she investigates Hiroshima's cultural experience to underline the importance of peace and community.

== Achievements ==
In 2014, Kehoe won the Irish Radharc Award for An Dubh Ina Gheal: Assimilation, and was commended for the European Prix CIRCOM awards.

Her artwork in 2020 formed part of Galway's successful application to be the European Capital of Culture that year.

Kehoe's films have been viewed at the Irish Film Festival, Galway Film Festival, Hiroshima International Film Festival, Cork Film Festival, Irish Cultural Festival New York, and Female Eye Film Festival Toronto.

== Filmography ==
=== Films ===
Year	Title	Director	Producer	Screenwriter	Notes
2010	A Burning Question	Yes		Yes	Documentary
2015	Dearghúil: Anatomy of Passion	Yes	Yes	Yes	Documentary
2020	I Am Galway 2020	Yes	Yes	Yes	Short film
2020	Living Pages Experience				
2022	Cathair Na Mílte Grian (City of a Thousand Suns)	Yes	Yes	Yes	

=== Television ===
Year	Title	Director	Producer	Writer	Notes
	Blue List				Series
2010–2013	Garraí Glas	Yes			Series
2013	An Dubh Ina Gheal: Assimilation	Yes	Yes	Yes	TV movie; documentary
2001–2023	Eco Eye	Yes			Series (several episodes)
2019	SÍolscéalta (Seedstories)	Yes	Yes	Yes	Series
2022	An Diabhal Inti (The Devil's In Her)	Yes	Yes	Yes	Series; co-producer

=== Music video ===
Year	Title	Type	Artist	Role	Notes
2014	Flanagan	Song	Philippa Nihill and Paula Kehoe	Co-writer; co-producer; editor	
