= Chenyang Zhao =

Chinese director and screenwriter

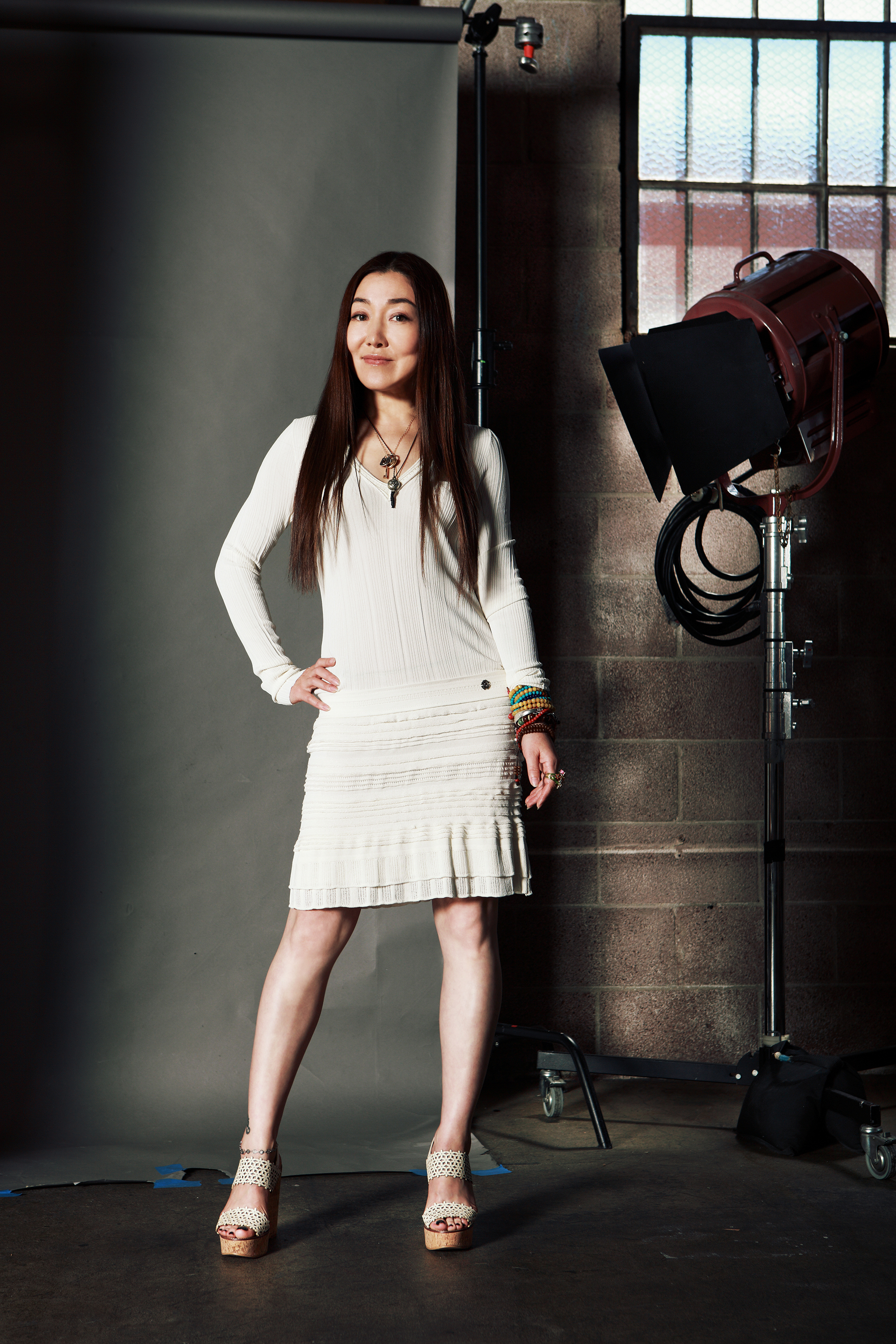
Zhao in 2015

Chenyang Zhao is a Chinese director and screenwriter. Some of Zhao's major works are Ten Month Pregnancy, The Lying Lover, Love till Eternity, AA lifestyle, The Marriages in Laomi Family, Companionate Couple, Marry to The West, Pretty Li Hui Zhen and so on. Zhao's artistic style focuses on the realistic theme of people's bittersweet, then turn it into the light and happy urban love stories in a bold attempt. Chenyang Zhao also supports the charity and encouraging the Sino-American Cooperation with her own brand KZ Grand Inc.

== Experience ==
In 2016, Zhao directed workplace comedy Beautiful Li Huizhen adapted from Korean drama She was Pretty.

== Personal life ==
In 2014, Zhao transformed her studio into Beijing Moni Shengshi Film & Television Media Co, Ltd.

== Major works ==
=== As director ===
| Time | Title | Screenwriter | Main Character |
| July 23, 2010 | The Lying Lover | Zhao Chenyang | Zhu Yuchen, Wang Qianyuan, Bai Baihe |
| April 1, 2012 | Love till Eternity | Zhao Chenyang | Guo Xiaodong, Zhao Ziqi, Liu Lili |
| April 2, 2012 | AA lifestyle | Zhao Chenyang | Li Xiaolu, Ren Chong, Ma Su |
| March 29, 2013 | The Marriages in Laomi Family | Cui Jie | Song Dandan, Zhang Hongjie, Fu Jing |
| February 8, 2015 | Companionate Couple | Kevin, Oranges, Kevin Studio | Jiang Wu, Yan Bingyan, Ma Li |
| 2015 | Marry to The West | Yuan Honglan | Yu Feihong, Jiang Wu, Yan Bingyan |
| January 2, 2017 | Pretty Li Hui Zhen | Lu to soft, Yang Qing | Dili Reba, Sheng Yi Lun, Li Xi Rui |

=== As screenwriter ===
| Premiere time | Title | Director | Main Character |
| February 10, 2006 | October Pregnant | Cao Baoping | Niu Li, Yang Tongshu, Xu Yajun |
| December 13200808 | Chun Cao | Zheng Xiaolong | Tao Hong, Wang Lei, Xi Meijuan |
| July 23, 2010 | The Lying Lover | Zhao Chenyang | Zhu Yuchen, Wang Qianyuan, Bai Baihe |
| December 14, 2010 | Paradise embroidery | Zhao Chenyang | Lu Yi, Han Zhihui, Liu Mu |
| April 1, 2012 | Love till Eternity | Zhao Chenyang | Guo Xiaodong, Zhao Ziqi, Liu Lili |
| April 2, 2012 | AA lifestyle | Zhao Chenyang | Li Xiaolu, Ren Chong, Ma Su |
| March 29, 2013 | The Marriages in Laomi Family | Zhao Chenyang | Song Dandan, Zhang Hongjie, Fu Jing |
| February 8, 2015 | Companionate Couple | Zhao Chenyang | Jiang Wu, Yan Bingyan, Ma Li |
| 2015 | Marry to The West | Zhao Chenyang | Yu Feihong, Jiang Wu, Yan Bingyan |
