= Andrea Shreeman =

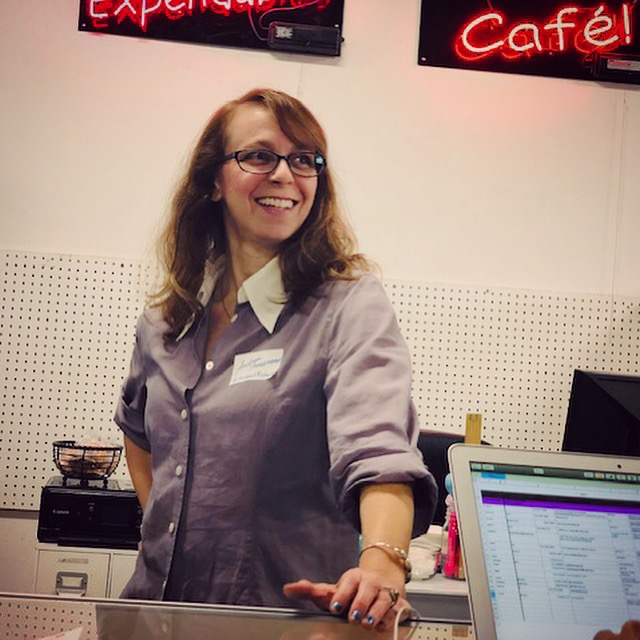
- Shreeman in 2019
- Education: The George Washington University, University of Southern California
- Occupations: Producer, Actress, Director, Writer

Andrea Shreeman (born March 12, 1969) is an American producer, actress, director, and writer. She has been on the team for eleven narrative feature films and seven documentary features, including as an executive producer on Fuel, which won the Audience Award for Best Documentary at Sundance. Shreeman's narrative film directing awards include Best Director, Best VFX, Best Actress, and Outstanding Achievement for a Thriller.

Her production company, Prudent Pictures, launched in 2016 and has been the home of film production, television development, and podcast production ever since.

Shreeman is a founding member of the comedy group No Time, which collaborated with director Darren Aronofsky on his thesis film for American Film Institute. No Time was born on the campus of The George Washington University in October 1990 and has continued under the name receSs for over 30 years.

Shreeman has been a producing partner in several large-scale events, most notably as a Founding Producer for Bhakti Fest and as Director of the Young Filmmakers Showcase for the Topanga Film Festival.

== Early life ==
Shreeman competed as a gymnast from a young age and landed a gymnastics scholarship at George Washington University. While in high school she booked her first professional acting jobs at Mill Mountain Playhouse in Roanoke, Virginia.

At GW, Shreeman majored in Radio and TV Broadcasting and performed in main-stage plays. She is a founding member of the sketch comedy group No Time, which changed its name to receSs and is still running on the GW campus today.

Following the death of Rosalind Wyman in 2022, Shreeman wrote a highly circulated article about her experiences with the politician while getting her Master's in Theatre at USC in the early 1990s.

== Career ==
=== 1993–2005: Early work ===
Shreeman worked as a personal assistant to comedy duo Renee Taylor and Joseph Bologna, which took her behind the scenes on The Nanny, Daddy Dearest and other network TV shows. She got her SAG card on Alcon Entertainment's first feature, Love is All There Is, directed by Taylor/Bologna. This propelled Shreeman into a decade-long acting career during which time she also flew between LA and DC to work on Standard Deviants TV, a long-running comedy educational series airing on PBS.

Shreeman produced a production of Amiri Baraka's Dutchman in 1999 that won three LA Weekly Awards. Shreeman's one person show, Bambi's Box, was an LA Weekly Theater Pick.

=== 2006–2015 Writing and Producing ===
Shreeman produced her first film in 2006, No Destination, starring John Savage and Brianna Brown. Next, she took on documentary producing with Sundance-winner, FUEL. And kept on from there with a dual track in narrative and documentary work. During this formative decade, Shreeman served as Head Writer on six short series for Mobile Magic Studios. She also produced two episodes of Modern Day Jesus for Comedy Central.

=== 2016– Directing debut and current ===
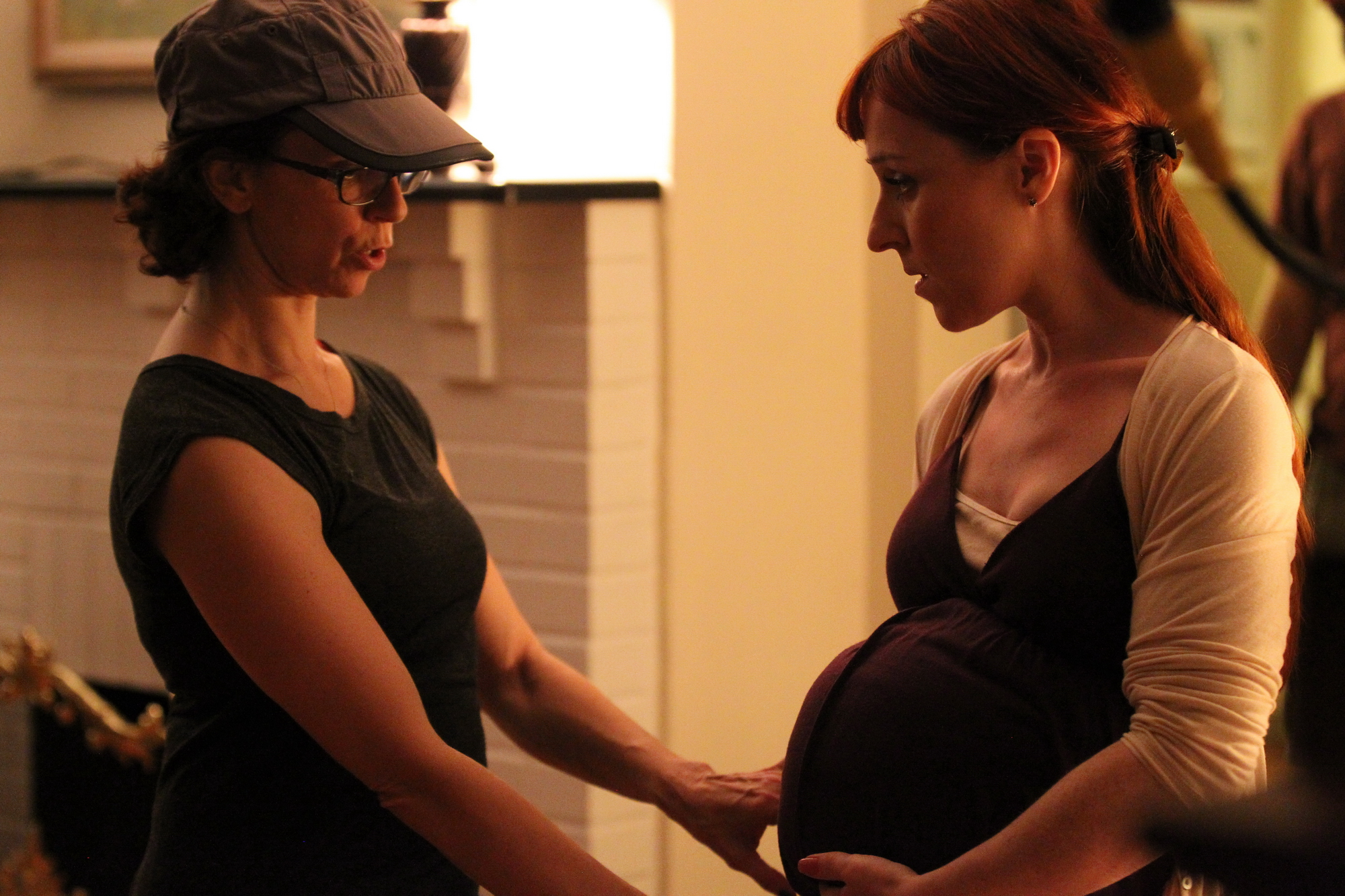
Andrea directs Ruth Connell as twins in Sienna Burning.

In 2015 Shreeman returned to her hometown of Roanoke to shoot her first short film as a writer/director, Sienna Burning, which starred Ruth Connell playing twin sisters. In building her directing career, Shreeman has shot music videos, live streams, commercial campaigns, a docuseries pilot for the legendary Dinah event in Palm Springs, and a host of short films, the most successful being Side Effect, a thriller written by Marty Lang about a psychiatrist who mysteriously exhibits the side effects of a drug she is over prescribing for financial gain.

In 2018 Shreeman was on the team for Amy Adrion's award-winning doc Half the Picture. In 2020 she produced the LA DOC award-winning feature, The Revolution Generation. In 2021, she landed a TV development deal with Insurrection Media, the subject of which became The Hero Maker Podcast..

In 2024 Shreeman optioned author Caeli Wolfson Widger's 2018 science fiction novel, Mother of Invention, to adapt for television. She is also finishing up two documentaries as an executive producer, both will be released in 2025.

== Podcast ==
While Shreeman was a student-athlete at GW, two athlete friends were victims of a brutal abduction that ended in their deaths. The adjudication of these crimes took 27 years, and their assailant turned out to be a prolific killer. In 2020 Shreeman went to work uncovering details of their story, interviewing individuals involved on both the criminal, and the justice side.

The Hero Maker Podcast Log Line: Vermont's Commissioner of Public Safety and her college buddy, a director/writer/executive producer based in LA, unpack the double homicide that binds them while distilling 35 years of law enforcement and criminal justice experience into nuggets of wisdom for the future.

Produced: 2 Seasons, 31 Episodes

== Event Production ==
Topanga Film Festival - Young Filmmakers Showcase (since 2020)

Topanga Talking Stick - Founding Producer

Death Happens: An Interactive Conversation with an Oncologist, Hospice Nurse, Pastor and Filmmaker

End of Life: A Community Conversation

Bhakti Fest - Founding Producer

Electric City - Producer

Art Party 911 - Producer
