= Olga Rautenkranzová =

Czech director and screenwriter

- Born: 22 September 1891; Prague, Austria-Hungary
- Died: 20th century
- Occupation(s): Actress, film director

Olga Rautenkranzová (22 September 1891 – ?) was a Czech actress and a pioneering film director active during the silent era. She is noted as being the first Czech woman director.

== Biography ==
Rautenkranzová began in the world of theater, studying under actress Marie Hübnerová. Her experience as an actress may have been why she was asked by production company Lucernafilm to direct the film Satyr, written by Quido Maria Vyskočil, in which she also played a lead role. She directed her next film with Lucernafilm as well, Učitel orientálních jazyků (The Oriental Languages Teacher). She then retired from film, and little is known about her life afterwards.

== Filmography ==
- Kozlonoh (Satyr) (1918)
- Učitel orientálních jazyků (The Oriental Languages Teacher) (1918)
