= Nordisk Panorama Film Festival =

- Location: Malmö, Sweden
- Founded: 1990
- Website: http://www.nordiskpanorama.com

Nordisk Panorama Film Festival is an annual film festival for Nordic short and documentary films, founded in 1990 and organized by Nordisk Panorama. From 1990 to 2012, the festival rotated between different cities in the five Nordic countries. Since 2013, it has taken place in Malmö, Sweden in September every year.

== Description ==
The festival is arranged by Nordisk Panorama, with support from the City of Malmö, Region Skåne and Film i Skåne, among others. During the festival, Nordisk Panorama offers film screenings and other audiovisual experiences in cinemas, museums, libraries, clubs and other venues in Malmö.

Nordisk Panorama highlights a selection of about 100 Nordic short and documentary films from new talents as well as established filmmakers. The festival is a platform for networking between film professionals from the Nordic countries and becomes a meeting place for the general audience and for filmmakers, producers, distributors and other professionals.

Nordisk Panorama consists of the annual festival and the two industry events Forum and Market. All year, the organization promotes Nordic short films and documentaries at international festivals and events, hosts workshops for filmmakers and presents seminars.

== History ==
Nordisk Panorama was founded in 1990 by the Danish organization Filmkontakt Nord. From 1990 to 2012, the festival took place in different Nordic cities each year under the name Nordisk Panorama – 5 Cities Film Festival. In 2013, there was a will to have a more permanent base for the festival and it is now held in Malmö in September every year.

From 2013 to 2018, the festival was a project under the City of Malmö, with support from Region Skåne and the Swedish Film Institute. Since 2018, Nordisk Panorama has been its own organization and consists of Filmkontakt Nord in Denmark and Film Festival Nord AB in Sweden, with financial support from the City of Malmö, Region Skåne, Film i Skåne and the Swedish Film Institute. It receives additional support from all Nordic film institutes, the Nordic Council of Ministers and the European Union MEDIA programme.

The cities hosting the festival from 1990 to 2012 were:

- 1990 Grimstad
- 1991 Aarhus
- 1992 Vaasa
- 1993 Kristianstad
- 1994 Reykjavík
- 1995 Bergen
- 1996 Copenhagen
- 1997 Helsinki
- 1998 Kiruna
- 1999 Reykjavík
- 2000 Bergen
- 2001 Aarhus
- 2002 Oulu
- 2003 Malmö
- 2004 Reykjavík
- 2005 Bergen
- 2006 Aarhus
- 2007 Oulu
- 2008 Malmö
- 2009 Reykjavík
- 2010 Bergen
- 2011 Aarhus
- 2012 Oulu

== Awards and programmes ==
=== Jury awards ===
The selected films compete in three sections, each with its own jury:

==== Best Nordic Documentary ====
- Sponsored by the Nordic public broadcasters DR, NRK, RUV, SVT and YLE.

==== Best Nordic Short Film ====
- Sponsored by the Nordic director's associations.
- The winning short film may qualify for consideration at the Academy Awards.

==== New Nordic Voice ====
- Introduces short films and documentaries by promising Nordic filmmakers.
- Sponsored by Film i Skåne and AVEK.

=== Audience awards ===
==== Young Nordic – Children's Choice Award ====
- Young Nordic is a programme aimed at children and youth.
- Sponsored by Nordisk Panorama.

==== City of Malmö's Audience Award ====
- All films in the main competition programmes are competing in this category.
- Sponsored by the City of Malmö.

=== Special Programme ===
In addition to the competition programmes, Nordisk Panorama has a special programme with films that do not compete in any of the award categories.

== Nordisk Panorama Forum ==
Nordisk Panorama Forum for Co-financing of Documentaries is an annual meeting place and funding event for industry professionals, open to filmmakers, decision makers, experts, observers and film school students. Forum is open to projects in any stage of production and the selected projects are pitched or presented to Nordic and international financiers and decision makers. To be eligible, a submitted project must qualify as an independent production, a Nordic or Baltic production, and have credible backing from a regional, national or international financier.

== Nordisk Panorama Market ==
Nordisk Panorama Market is open to distributors, buyers and film festivals. The market showcases new Nordic shorts and documentary films and consists of events, seminars and opportunities to network and promote new films. Market also arranges closed screenings for shorts and docs yet to premiere internationally, and a work-in-progress event for upcoming titles.
