= Danielle Faraldo =

American independent filmmaker

Danielle Faraldo (born June 21, 1966) is an American independent filmmaker.
