= Giulia Marletta =

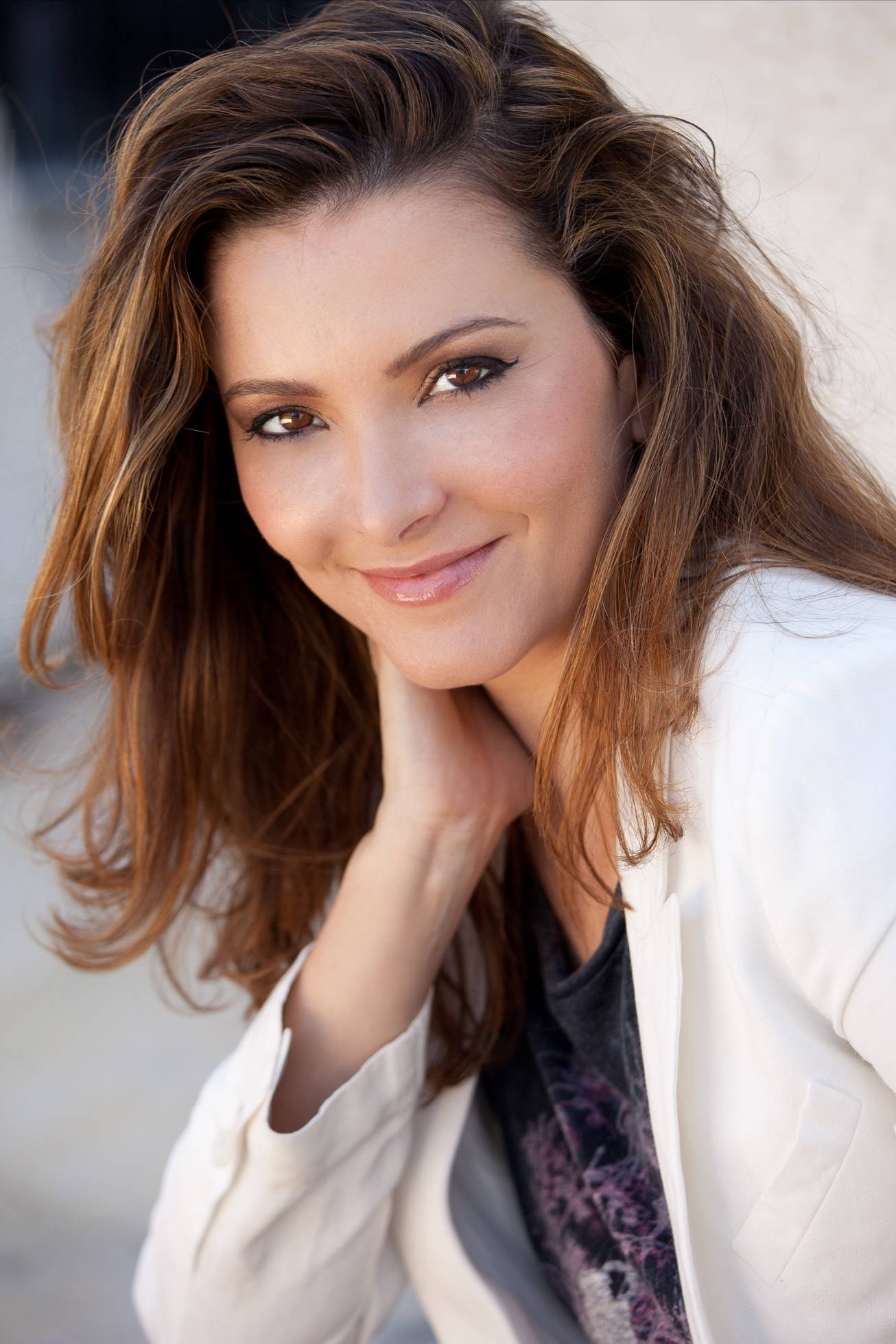
- Education: Kunstakademie Düsseldorf, Düsseldorf, Germany
- Alma mater: New York University Tisch School of the Arts (B.A.)
- Occupations: Film producer Film director
- Years active: 2000–present
- Parent: Franco Marletta (father)
- Website: marlettafilms.com

Giulia Marletta is an Italian-born film producer, television producer, director, and entertainment executive. She has been instrumental in establishing international financing for films in both the US and Europe. The films that she has preferred to produce have been director driven with complex and dark subject matter. During her career as a producer and executive producer, she has worked with directors including Dario Argento, David Lynch, Werner Herzog, and Al Pacino.

Early in her career, Marletta worked as a film director; she began to produce films in the early 2000s. Marletta has produced films that have been nominated for awards at major international film festivals. The last film that she executive produced, Wilde Salome, was directed by and starred Al Pacino, and won a Queer Lion award at the 2011 Venice Film Festival. The last television show produced was My Flipping Family which ran on HGTV in 2014.

Giulia Marletta was a promoter and board member of Film Investimenti Piemonte S.r.l. (FIP), a multinational mixed capital investment company established in Turin, Italy for the financing and production of international films. US-based funding for the company was provided through Endgame Entertainment. Giulia Marletta’s company Marletta Films, based in Los Angeles, currently develops, produces and funds international projects for film and television.

== Early life ==
The daughter of painter Franco Marletta, Giulia Marletta was raised in Turin, Italy, and left Italy at the age of eighteen. She attended the Kunstakademie Düsseldorf (Academy of Fine Arts) in Düsseldorf, Germany; and graduated with Honors from New York University Tisch School of the Arts with a B.A. in Film and TV Production. Marletta produced and directed the 2000 short film One Night, her thesis project at NYU, which began shooting in the Fall 1998, and which was later screened at the First Run Film Festival on March 31, 2005.

== Career ==
From 1999 to 2001 Marletta worked as an executive director and producer for the platform IndiePlanet at Urban Box Office Network (UBO) an online marketing and distributor conglomerate founded by George Jackson and Adam Kidron in New York City. She developed and oversaw projects at Urban Box Office, including “Artist to Artist”, which she co-created and directed with rapper Q-Tip. “Artist to Artist” starred Puff Daddy. From 2001 to 2003 Marletta partnered with Sylvain White in directing music video work for Michelle Williams of Destiny's Child.

From 2003 to 2005, Marletta consulted as a studio Business development executive for Lumiq Studios, an animation and digital production studio based in Turin, Italy. Marletta was an Executive Producer of the 3D character animated Spanish language film Donkey Xote co-produced with Filmax Animation in Spain. The film received a 2009 Gaudi Awards nomination for Best Animated Film, and also received a 2009 Goya Awards nomination for Best Animated Feature.

She was also a producer of the 2007 supernatural horror film, The Mother of Tears, third in The Three Mothers trilogy and directed by Dario Argento. A preview of the film was shown on May 17, 2007 at the Cannes Film Festival; the film debuted in Italy at the Rome Film Fest on October 24, 2007, and was released in the United States in June 2008.

Also in 2007, Marletta promoted the concept of creating the first mixed capital fund in Italy for the financing and production of international films. Endgame Entertainment provided US based funding for the project that was established in the Piedmont region of Italy. In 2008, the project took form as Film Investimenti Piemonte S.r.l. (FIP), with Marletta having served as an Executive Board Member until January, 2010.

In 2009, Marletta was co-executive producer for My Son, My Son, What Have Ye Done, working with producer David Lynch and with Werner Herzog, who directed the movie. Marletta was attracted to the film because of love for the work of Lynch and Herzog Herzog was nominated for a Golden Lion Award at the Venice Film Festival.

In 2011, Marletta worked as an executive producer for Wilde Salome, directed by Al Pacino. The film won a Queer Lion Award at the Venice Film Festival.

For television, Marletta was a co-executive producer for the HGTV reality show My Flipping Family. The show's first season was released in 2014.

== Filmography and accolades ==
=== As producer, director ===
| Year | Film Title | Involvement | Notes |
|---|---|---|---|
| 2000 | New York is Disappearing | assistant director | |
| 2000 | One Night | producer, director | |
| 2004 | Exit 8A | assistant director | |
| 2007 | Mother of Tears | producer | |
| 2007 | Donkey Xote | executive producer | Nominated – 2009 Goya Award Best Animation Film (Mejor Película de Animación); Nominated – 2009 Gaudi Award Best Animated Feature (Millor Pel.lícula d' Animació) |
| 2009 | My Son, My Son, What Have Ye Done | co-executive producer | Nominated – 2009 Venice Film Festival Golden Lion: Werner Herzog; Nominated – 2010 Casting Society of America Artios Award: Outstanding Achievement in Casting – Low Budget Feature – Drama/Comedy: Johanna Ray Jenny Jue |
| 2011 | Wilde Salome | executive producer | Won – 2011 Venice Film Festival Queer Lion Award |

=== As producer ===
| Year | Film Title | Involvement | Notes |
|---|---|---|---|
| 2014- | My Flipping Family | co-executive producer | |
