= A Million Happy Nows =

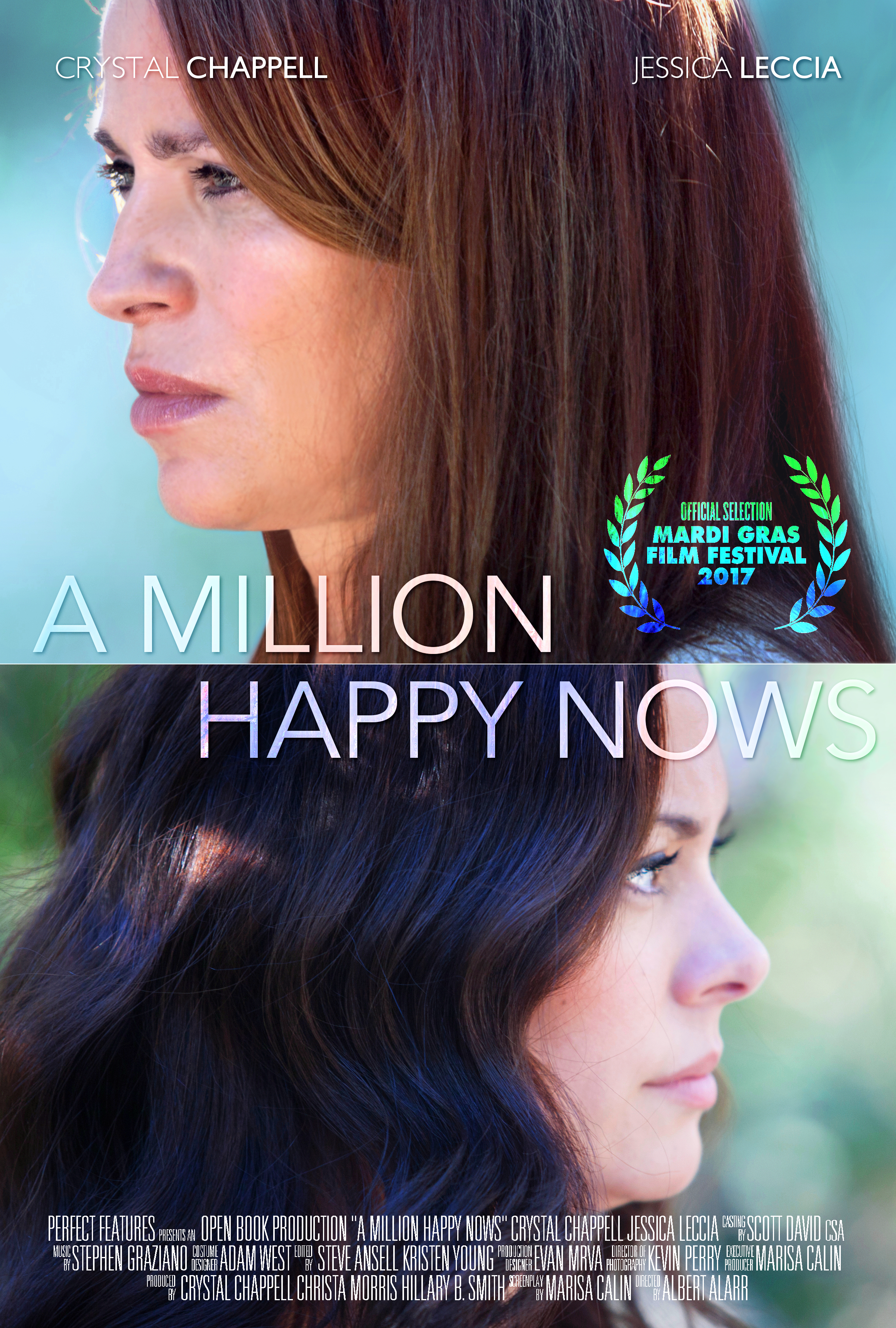
- Official theatrical poster
- Directed by: Albert Alarr
- Written by: Marisa Calin
- Produced by: Marisa Calin; Crystal Chappell; Christa Morris; Hillary B. Smith
- Starring: Crystal Chappell; Jessica Leccia; Hillary B. Smith; Dendrie Taylor
- Cinematography: Kevin Perry
- Edited by: Steve Ansell; Kristen Young
- Music by: Stephen Graziano
- Production companies: Perfect Features; Open Book Productions
- Release dates: March 15, 2017 (Roze Filmdagen); January 2018
- Running time: 80 minutes
- Country: United States
- Language: English

A Million Happy Nows is a 2017 American independent drama film written by Marisa Calin and directed by Albert Alarr. The film stars Crystal Chappell and Jessica Leccia as a lesbian couple dealing with the diagnosis of early onset Alzheimer's.

Veteran actress Lainey Allen (Chappell) is tired of being sidelined for younger talent on the soap she has starred in for twenty years. Coupled with finding it harder to retain her lines, she decides not to renew her contract, and she and her publicist and partner, Eva Morales (Leccia), move to a beach house overlooking the ocean on the Central California coast. The move highlights some small changes in Lainey’s personality – mild depression that Eva puts down to leaving the show. But when Lainey starts to forget more than can be attributed to stress, Eva insists on a visit to the doctor.

The film follows Lainey and Eva as they navigate Lainey’s early-onset Alzheimer’s diagnosis and adjust to a new dynamic where Eva becomes her primary caregiver.

== Cast ==
- Crystal Chappell as Lainey Allen
- Jessica Leccia as Eva Morales
- Hillary B. Smith as Val
- Dendrie Taylor as Julie
- Dan Gauthier as Jason
- Robert Gant as Dr. Hansen
- Marisa Calin as Kate
- Dale Raoul as Wendy
- Roberta Valderrama as Mindy
- Cuyle Carvin as Mike
- Andrew Dits as Bartender
- Michael Corbett as Aden
- Brett Weinstock as Press Guy
- Donnell Turner as Mr. Handsome
- Susan Seaforth Hayes as Katy
- Mark Hapka as Soap Actor
- Elissa Reilly Slater as Soap Actor

== Production ==
Stars Crystal Chappell and Jessica Leccia acquired a fanbase following their popular pairing as Olivia Spencer and Natalia Rivera Aitoro on CBS’ Guiding Light. Since airing in 2009, the storyline, given the portmanteau “Otalia”, which received critical acclaim and earned Chappell an Outstanding Lead Actress Daytime Emmy nomination has received around 30 million views on YouTube.

In response to the overwhelming global support and positive outpouring from the underrepresented LGBT community, Chappell (now a recipient of the Human Rights Campaign Ally Award) created her production company, Open Book Productions, to bring original programming to the screen, producing Venice: The Series, which received the 2011 Emmy for Outstanding Special Class Short Format Daytime - the first Emmy awarded to content produced for the web, and the 2014 Emmy for Outstanding New Approaches - Drama Series She continued to produce original and creatively uncensored programming with her latest series, LGBT themed political drama Beacon Hill, which was also nominated for the 2015 Outstanding New Approaches - Drama Series Emmy. Open Book Productions was approached by writer Marisa Calin in 2013 and began the collaboration to bring A Million Happy Nows to the screen with Calin's production company Perfect Features.

A Million Happy Nows represents the first big-screen pairing of Crystal Chappell and Jessica Leccia.

Principal photography took place in California over 20 days in late 2014. The majority of the film was shot in a house overlooking the ocean on the Malibu coast. Post-production was completed at Technicolor in New York in mid 2016.

== Release ==
A Million Happy Nows premiered on the festival circuit in January 2017, and was officially selected for most major LGBT festivals throughout the year including Mardi Gras Film Festival (Sydney), Inside Out Film and Video Festival (Toronto), FilmOut San Diego, Frameline (San Francisco), Outfest (Los Angeles) and Newfest (New York) In September 2016, Sales Agent Shoreline Entertainment picked up the rights to the film, and in November 2017, the distribution rights for Germany, Switzerland, Austria, Lichtenstein and Luxembourg were sold to German distributor, Pro-Fun Media. The film was released in those territories as Millionen Momente Voller Glückin in mid December, 2017 and ended the year at number 1 in the DVD category in LGBT films on Amazon.de. North American rights went to Gravitas Ventures in the same month. They released the film across most Video-on-Demand platforms, including iTunes and Amazon Video, in the U.S and Canada on January 23, 2018, under the title 1 Million Happy Nows. The film was released on DVD and Blu-ray in the U.S. in May, 2018. Releases followed in Taiwan, Vietnam, Cambodia and Malaysia by Creative Century Entertainment, in Bulgaria by Medialine, in Poland by Tongariro Releasing, and in Brazil by Encripta.

== Reception ==
Prominent magazine AfterEllen, which focuses on the portrayal of lesbian and bisexual women in the media, featured A Million Happy Nows at number 6 on their list of [13 best films of 2017]. In their review from May 2017, they described the film as ‘dramatic gold’. Curve Magazine also included the film at number 9 on their list of 10 best films of the year about LGBTIQ woman, alongside critical and commercial successes such as Battle of the Sexes starring Emma Stone. A Million Happy Nows was also the winner of Curve Magazine's Mystery Movie Poll to screen a film for audiences at ClexaCon, the first convention celebrating the LGBTQ community and its allies, born of the pairing of character from the CW's The 100, Clarke and Lexa. The film came away with the film festival's award for Best Feature.

A Million Happy Nows has received positive reviews across the board since its premiere at the Mardi Gras Film Festival in January 2017 with the Sydney Arts Guide writing “this film is a labour of love and it's there in every frame and every word... stay(s) with you long after you emerge into the outside glare.” The Hollywood Times described it as “Absolutely Phenomenal” celebrating the British invasion at Outfest in the form of opening night film God's Own Country, and British writer Marisa Calin's win for Best First Feature for A Million Happy Nows.

Film Festival Official Selections (A select few are listed)
The Mardi Gras Film Festival (Sydney, Australia)
Palm Beach International Film Festival
Inside Out Film and Video Festival Toronto LGBT Film Festival
Frameline Film Festival (San Francisco, California)
NewFest Film Festival (New York, New York)

== Accolades ==
Film Festival	Award
Desperado Film Festival (Phoenix)	Best Feature
ClexaCon Film Festival (Las Vegas)	Best Feature
Roze Filmdagen (Amsterdam)	Audience Award for Best Female Feature
Philadelphia Independent Film Festival	Best Feature
Philadelphia Independent Film Festival	Best Actress: Crystal Chappell
Philadelphia Independent Film Festival	Best Actress: Jessica Leccia
Philadelphia Independent Film Festival	Best Director: Albert Alarr
FilmOut San Diego	Best Feature
FilmOut San Diego	Best Actress: Crystal Chappell
FilmOut San Diego	Best Supporting Actress: Jessica Leccia
Freiburg Lesbian Film Festival	Audience Award, Golden Tanna for Best Film
Outfest (Los Angeles)	Audience Award for Best First U.S. Narrative Feature
QFilms Long Beach Film Festivals	Best Narrative Feature Jury Award
Fresno Reel Pride LGBTQ Film Festival	Best Feature
Out On Film (Atlanta, Georgia)	Audience Award for Best Female Feature
Out On Film (Atlanta, Georgia)	Best Actress: Crystal Chappell
Out At The Movies (Winston-salem, North Carolina)	Audience Award for Best Feature
Image Out (Rochester, New York)	Audience Award for Best Feature
Reel Q (Pittsburgh, Pennsylvania)	Favorite Feature Film
