= We're Getting Nowhere =

- Genre: Talk Show, Vlog
- Starring: Karman Kregloe, Jill Bennett, Dara Nai
- Original language: English

Production
- Executive producer: Sarah Warn
- Production location: Los Angeles

Original release
- Network: AfterEllen

Related
- Brunch With Bridget

We're Getting Nowhere The Terrible Three talk back to your TV is a vlog (video blog) that is posted Thursdays on AfterEllen where the three regular hosts Karman Kregloe, Jill Bennett and Dara Nai (a.k.a. The Terrible Three), talk about new episodes of various programs related mainly, but not exclusively to lesbian themed TV-shows. Series covered in the vlog include South of Nowhere, America's Next Top Model and The L Word. In the broadcasts episodes are recapped, re-enacting of various scenes with and without the use of sock puppets and other props may occur, relevant and irrelevant trivia and general opinions on the episode in question are shared with the audience. After recapping Season One of The L Word (when it premiered on Logo), WGN was retired.

== Location ==
Originally filmed in the bedroom of Jill Bennett's residence in Los Angeles, California, it has since been moved to her living room. A few episodes very early on in the show had taken place in Dara's living room as well.

== Guests on We're Getting Nowhere ==
Several actors, writers and comedians have been guests on the vlog. Guests have included:

- Maeve Quinlan
- Mandy Musgrave
- Matt Cohen
- Sarah Warn
- Lori Grant
- Bridget McManus
- Maile Flanagan
- Liz Feldman
- Jane Lynch
- Meredith Scott Lynn
- Coley Sohn
- Elizabeth Keener
