= And Then Came Lola =

2009 movie by Ellen Seidler and Megan Siler

- Directed by: Ellen Seidler; Megan Siler
- Screenplay by: Megan Siler
- Story by: Ellen Seidler; Megan Siler
- Produced by: Ellen Seidler; Megan Siler
- Starring: Ashleigh Sumner; Jill Bennett; Cathy DeBuono; Jessica Graham
- Cinematography: Jennifer Derbin
- Production company: Fast Girl Films
- Release date: June 19, 2009
- Running time: 71 minutes
- Country: United States
- Language: English

And Then Came Lola is a 2009 comedy-drama film jointly written, directed and produced by Ellen Seidler and Megan Siler.

== Premise ==
Lola is a photographer, who is ready to take things to the next level with her new girlfriend, Casey. Lola sets out to run an errand for Casey, involving delivering some crucial prints for a business meeting with Danielle, who is also Casey's ex. Lola runs out the door, and what follows is a series of high-speed encounters and obstacles that threaten to keep her from her destination. These encounters run the gamut from the mundane to the unlikely, sometimes repeating themselves with different results, each presented using different cinematic techniques that control the mood and pace.

== Cast ==
Actor	Character
Ashleigh Sumner	Lola
Jill Bennett	Casey
Cathy DeBuono	Danielle
Jessica Graham	Jen
Angelyna Martinez	Meter Maid
Candy Tolentino	Alex
Linda Ignazi	Seri
Jenoa Harlow	Speed Freak Girl
Lisa Dewey	Therapist / Motorcycle Woman
Kathy Domenici	Taxi Tourist
Buzz Halsing	Taxi Tourist (credited as Grant Halsing)
Laurie Graham	Taxi Driver
Chris Resciniti	Muni Boy
Christopher Sugarman	Muni Boy
Eileen Agas	Inside Bar Patron

== Release ==
The film premiered on June 19, 2009, at the San Francisco Frameline LGBT Film Festival, and went on to screen at over 100 additional festivals.

== Reception ==
After Ellen reviewer Danielle Riendeau called the film "a combination of Run Lola Run and Groundhog Day", that "plays out like a twisty, lighter Run Lola Run with a massive dose of queerness", and described some of the photographic sequences as "funny, campy and wildly imaginative". The CinemaQueer review likewise found the film "sweet and likable", and reviewer Michael D. Klemm felt that "first time filmmakers Ellen Seidler and Megan Siler undoubtedly had a ball making this film and it shows". Autostraddle called And Then Came Lola a "funny guilty pleasure indie flick set in the super gay-ed up streets of San Francisco".

== Awards ==
Year	Award	Category	Nominee(s)	Result
2009	Tampa International Gay and Lesbian Film Festival	Best Supporting Actress	Cathy DeBuono	Won
