= TheBacklot.com =

Culture website

TheBacklot
- Website type: Blog, news
- Available in: English
- Owner: Logo
- Creator: Sarah Warn
- Website: thebacklot.com
- Commercial: Commercial
- Registration: Optional
- Launched: January 2005
- Current status: Online (under Logo subsidiary NewNowNext.com)

TheBacklot.com (TheBacklot), founded in January 2005 as AfterElton (AfterElton.com), was a culture website that focused on the portrayal of gay and bisexual men in the media, and was the companion site of the lesbian-focused AfterEllen (AfterEllen.com). TheBacklot was dissolved in June 2015, and its content was merged with the website NewNowNext, owned by Logo TV.

== History ==
TheBacklot was originally known under the name AfterElton and was founded by Sarah Warn, Michael Jensen, and Brent Hartinger. Warn initially served as editor-in-chief of both AfterElton and AfterEllen. Jensen became Editor in Chief of AfterElton in November 2005 and served in the position until September 25, 2011. Dennis Ayers, formerly the site's managing editor, took over as Editor in Chief.

The site was not affiliated with Elton John, although its original name refers to the milestone for gay men when John publicly came out. The site featured television, film, music, books, and celebrity news. It published articles, regular columns, reviews, and recaps of television shows with gay and bisexual characters, and maintained several blogs, including the "Meme" by Ed Kennedy.

AfterElton (along with AfterEllen) was acquired by cable television channel Logo in 2006. On January 12, 2012, the site announced that Louis Virtel had been hired as its West Coast entertainment editor. On January 31, 2013, Dennis Ayers announced that AfterElton would be changing its name to TheBacklot.com in April. The change was motivated by a desire to separate the website from its "AfterEllen's little brother" origin and to reflect the general "focus on Hollywood and the film and television industry". The relaunch under the new name took place on April 17, 2013.

On June 29, 2015, Ayers announced that TheBacklot was merging with NewNowNext, an LGBT-themed entertainment website owned by Logo. TheBacklot name was discontinued and Dan Avery became Editor-in-Chief of the combined site.

== Hot 100 ==
The "Hot 100" was an annual readers poll, begun in 2007, of the "top names in film, television, music, sports and fashion".

Hot 100
Year	Winner	Top ten	Ref.
2007	Jake Gyllenhaal	2nd: Chris Evans; 3rd: Daniel Craig; 4th: Gale Harold; 5th: Taye Diggs; 6th: Ryan Reynolds; 7th: Hugh Jackman; 8th: T. R. Knight; 9th: Ryan Phillippe; 10th: John Barrowman	
2008	Jake Gyllenhaal	2nd: John Barrowman; 3rd: Luke Macfarlane; 4th: Cheyenne Jackson; 5th: Neil Patrick Harris; 6th: Gale Harold; 7th: Van Hansis; 8th: Chris Evans; 9th: Anderson Cooper; 10th: Ryan Reynolds	
2009	Neil Patrick Harris	2nd: John Barrowman; 3rd: Luke Macfarlane; 4th: Jake Gyllenhaal; 5th: Jensen Ackles; 6th: Chris Evans; 7th: Cheyenne Jackson; 8th: Hugh Jackman; 9th: Gale Harold; 10th: James Franco	
2010	Neil Patrick Harris	2nd: Scott Evans; 3rd: John Barrowman; 4th: Luke Macfarlane; 5th: Adam Lambert; 6th: Ricky Martin; 7th: Cheyenne Jackson; 8th: Jake Gyllenhaal; 9th: Van Hansis; 10th: Chris Evans	
2011	Darren Criss	2nd: Adam Lambert; 3rd: Chris Colfer; 4th: Neil Patrick Harris; 5th: John Barrowman; 6th: Luke Macfarlane; 7th: Jonathan Groff; 8th: Jensen Ackles; 9th: Anderson Cooper; 10th: Ricky Martin	
2012	Darren Criss	2nd: Chris Colfer; 3rd: Matt Bomer; 4th: Jared Padalecki; 5th: Neil Patrick Harris; 6th: Jensen Ackles; 7th: Chris Evans; 8th: John Barrowman; 9th: Harry Shum Jr.; 10th: Adam Lambert	
2013	Matt Bomer	2nd: Darren Criss; 3rd: Chris Colfer; 4th: Adam Lambert; 5th: Dylan O'Brien; 6th: Dan Feuerriegel; 7th: John Barrowman; 8th: Ryan Gosling; 9th: Tyler Hoechlin; 10th: Neil Patrick Harris	
