= 2 Minutes Later =

- Directed by: Robert Gaston
- Written by: Robert Gaston
- Produced by: Megan Mascena Gaspar; Robert Gaston; Farrel Lever; Lindsay Grow
- Starring: Michael Molina; Jessica Graham; Peter Stickles; Matt Cannon
- Cinematography: MJ Schirmer
- Edited by: Farrel Lever
- Music by: Houston Bernard
- Production company: 2ML Productions
- Distributed by: TLA Releasing
- Release date: 2007
- Running time: 71 minutes
- Country: United States
- Language: English

2 Minutes Later is a 2007 American mystery thriller film directed by Robert Gaston, starring Michael Molina, Jessica Graham, Peter Stickles and Matt Cannon.

== Cast ==
- Michael Molina as Michael/Kyle Damar
- Jessica Graham as Abigail Marks
- Peter Stickles as Victor
- Matt Cannon as Joey
- Jennifer Layne Park as Monique
- Mei-Yann Hwang as May
- Lyndon Tate as Tevin
- Grant Barker as Samuel
- Houston Bernard as Nico
- Liz Douglas as Kimmy
- Scott Spragg as Franz
- Kim Blackman as Kendle Darr
- Adam R. Deremer as Gio
- Greg Ratz as Conner
- Ben Sander as Emily Monroe
- Brooke Lewis Bellas as Allison

== Reception ==
Karmen Kregloe of AfterEllen praised the "great" characters, the "terrific" acting, the "tight" story and the "clever" dialogue. However, she criticised the editing, writing that "the opening credits are endless, and several of the scenes run long, as though the filmmaker was too much in love with his shot to know when to cut it." Andrew Gronvall of the Chicago Reader wrote that while the mystery is "never satisfactorily resolved" and "not all the actors show the same level of skill", the film is "enjoyable enough for the leads' easygoing, deadpan rapport, and the sight of Graham chasing bad guys in a metallic sheath and spiky heels is a hoot."

Steve Warren of the Windy City Times called the film a "decent time-waster you can watch and forget two minutes later." Warren praised the technical work but criticised the writing, direction and acting. Scotty McKellar of The Skinny wrote, "On a certain level this silly fluff is fun while it lasts, but two minutes later you won't remember a thing about it." Rob Salerno of Xtra Magazine criticised the "terrible" acting, the "poor" sound quality, the "lazy" cinematography, the script and the "ludicrously straightforward" plot. However, he wrote that while the film "fails in everything it sets out to do", its failure is "so spectacular that it's just a fun ride."

Matt Pais of the Chicago Tribune rated the film 1 star out of 5 and wrote that it is "needlessly long for something so badly written and performed."
