= Marisa Calin =

British actress

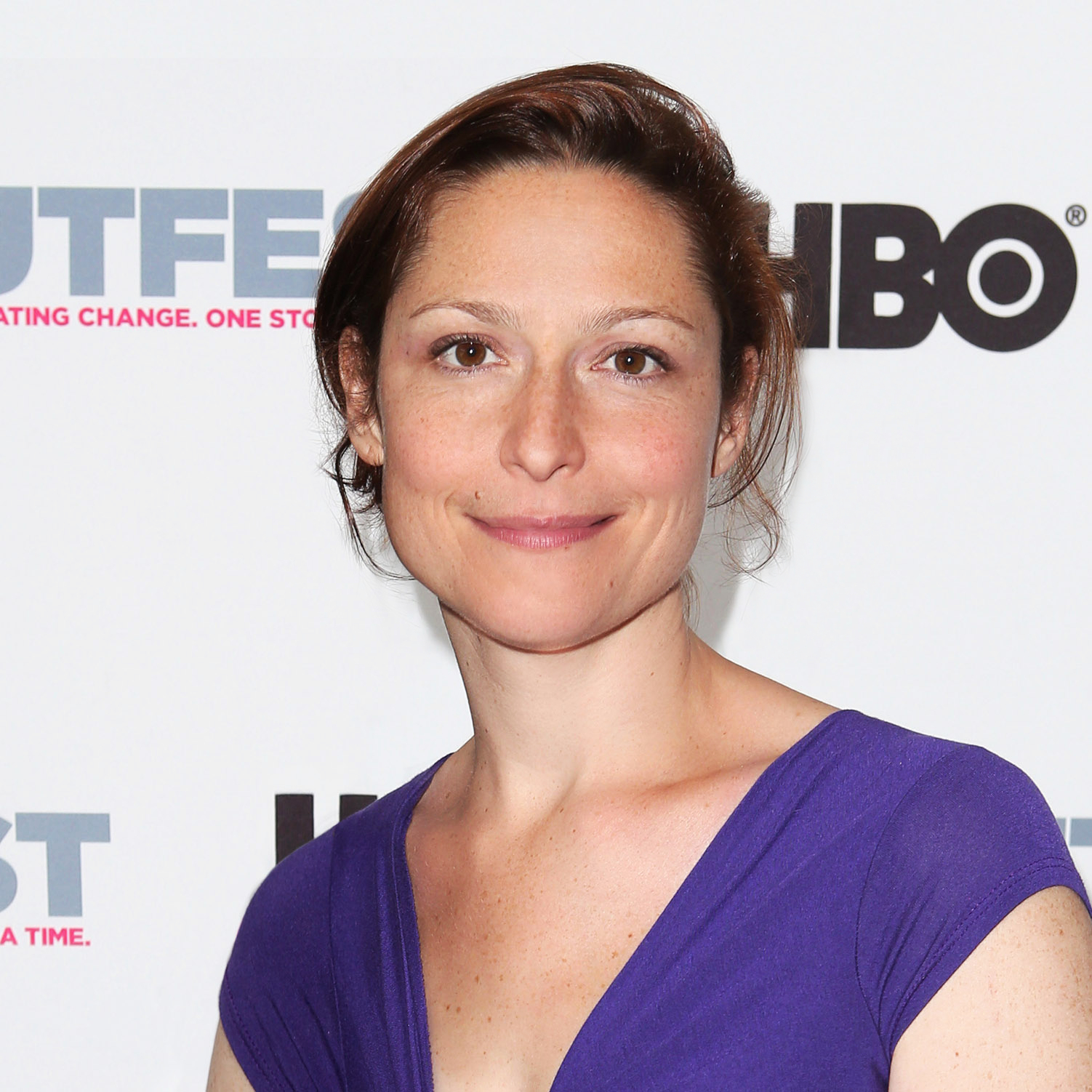
- Calin at the Outfest premiere of A Million Happy Nows, 2017
- Born: Marisa Calin; 5 January 1983 (age 43); California, U.S.
- Education: American Academy of Dramatic Arts
- Occupation: Actress
- Years active: 2017–present
- Website: marisacalin.com

Marisa Calin (born 5 January 1983) is an American-born English actor, writer and producer.

== Early life and education ==
A native of Bath, Somerset, Calin began her actor's training at the Junior Guildhall School of Music and Drama in London, and at 18 attended the American Academy of Dramatic Arts in New York.

== Career ==
=== Writing ===
Calin's debut book, the young adult novel Between You & Me, was published in 2012 by Bloomsbury. It earned positive reviews in Kirkus and Publishers' Weekly. Between You and Me was named a Kirkus Best Book of 2012 and was selected for the American Library Associations’ 2013 Rainbow Book List of quality books with authentic LGBT content.

=== Audiobook narration ===
As an audiobook narrator, Calin has earned an Audie Award nomination for full cast recording of Hans Christian Andersen’s Fairytales, and an Audie win for Sadie by Courtney Summers. Calin has earned AudioFile magazine's Earphones Awards for a variety of titles, including books by Garth Nix, Jennifer Robson, and Mary Calvi's Dear George, Dear Mary, for which she was featured on CBS in a behind-the-scenes look at the making of audiobooks. Her performance in Sophie McKenzie’s Close My Eyes received a Publishers Weekly Starred Review and made their 2013 Listen-Up Awards for Audiobooks of the year. She led an effects-full production of Teeth in the Mist by Dawn Kurtagich for Hachette Audio which was named by Paste Magazine as one of the 19 Best Audiobooks of 2019 So Far. Three titles she narrated in 2019 were selected for Yalsa's round up of Amazing Audiobooks. 2024 included a Society of Voice Arts and Sciences award nomination for Outstanding Audiobook Narration – Fiction – Best Voiceover.

=== Film ===
Calin wrote and produced the independent drama film A Million Happy Nows with her company Perfect Features. The film played primarily the LGBT festival circuit for the 2017 season, screening at more than 50 festivals including the Mardi Gras Film Festival, Frameline Film Festival, the Palm Beach International Film Festival and Outfest. The film won Outfest's Audience Award for Best First U.S. Narrative Feature. It also won Curve Magazine's poll to screen at the first ClexaCon film festival in Las Vegas in 2017, and came away with the award for Best Feature.

Research for the film led to Calin's advocacy for the Women's Brain Project and she was their guest at the International Forum on Women's Brain and Mental Health in Zurich, Switzerland in 2019.
