= Jessica Graham =

American actress

Jessica Graham is an American actress, producer and meditation teacher. She has acted in films such as Murder Made Easy, and 2 Minutes Later for which she won Best Actress Award at the Tampa International Gay and Lesbian Film Festival.

== Early life ==
Graham was born and raised in the Philadelphia area. She is the oldest of three sisters and has a half-brother and two step brothers. Her mother raises and trains Alpacas and also works as a gardener for an all-women's gardening company. Her stepfather is a carpenter and her father, who died, worked in an oil refinery. Graham spent part of her childhood living in a 400-year-old house in Ridley State Park without television. Graham is self-taught except for attending The School in Rose Valley from 4th through 6th grade. It was there that Graham performed in her first real play, Antigone, playing the title role.

== Career ==
Before moving to Los Angeles from Philadelphia, she was the Producing Artistic Director or Theater Catalyst. She also co-founded both Theater Catalyst's Eternal Spiral Project, and Stonegraham Productions, (producers of *girl*, a Philadelphia lesbian party). With the Eternal Spiral Project, she produced and acted in numerous plays including a collection of monologues by Joyce Carol Oates called, "I Stand Before You Naked", and Scab, by Sheila Callaghan.

Since moving to Los Angeles, she has appeared in a number of films including And Then Came Lola, Devil Girl and 2 Minutes Later which won her the Best Actress Award at the Tampa International Gay and Lesbian Film Festival. She has also appeared on the stage and her commercial credits include AOL, Southwest Airlines, and PETA. In 2013, Jessica produced Chasseur, written and directed by her frequent collaborator Christopher Soren Kelly, and starring Kelly and Joshua Bitton, which won Best Short at Fly Away Film Festival and Timecode:NOLA. In 2015, she produced and starred opposite Christopher Soren Kelly in the short film Monkeys, for which Kelly also directed. She will again be seen opposite Kelly in two new features, 'The Tangle and Murder Made Easy.

She is a member of SAG-AFTRA.

== Personal life ==
Graham is a meditation teacher and also writes about meditation. She is a contributing editor of the meditation blog, Deconstructing Yourself.

In an interview for the website AfterEllen.com, Graham described herself as an "out bisexual woman" and joked she was "70/30 women to men". She also said, "the real, honest truth is I have been madly in love with three women in my life, and had long-term relationships with them. Madly in love. Maybe a little too madly. And lived with women. But I've done the same thing with men. I've been in long-term relationships with men, and been madly in love with them, too." as well as "I'm interested when an actress comes out. I'm interested when somebody makes a comment about how they fantasize about other women...It's such a double-sided thing."

== Filmography ==
- My Father's Gun (2002) (TV) as Patrice
- Inclinations (2005) as The Muse
- Thirsty (2005) as Hannah (also writer and producer credits)
- The Coat Room (2005) as Kristin
- Rent Control (2006) as Lucy
- 2 Minutes Later (2007) as Abigail Marks
- Starting from Scratch (2007) as Kissing Girl
- Heart of the Jade Empress (2007) as Scarlet Guard 1
- Devil Girl (2007) as Fay
- Dire Straights (2007) as Bride
- Tremble & Spark (2007) as Veronica Anderson
- And Then Came Lola (2009) as Jen
- A Night at the Office (2012) as Lois
- She4Me (2014) as Actress
- Monkeys (2014) as Lilla
- Crazed (2015) as Jackie
- Doin' It (2017) as Sandra
- BnB HELL (2017) as Jackie
- Murder Made Easy (2017) as Joan
- The Tangle (2019) as Laurel
