= Anna Margarita Albelo =

Cuban-American filmmaker

Anna Margarita Albelo is a Cuban-American filmmaker, based in Los Angeles, USA and Paris, France. Her work is known for containing subject matter pertaining to post-modern conceptualizations of identity, namely feminist womanhood and sexuality. She was nominated for the John Cassavetes Spirit Awards in 2020 for producing "Wild Nights with Emily" by Madeleine Olnek, starring Molly Shannon.

== Biography ==
Born in Los Angeles, California, but raised in Miami, Florida, Anna Margarita Albelo is the daughter of Cuban exiles who settled in the United States in the mid-1950s. She attended Coral Gables Senior High School class of 1987, and was the captain of both the volleyball and softball team in her senior year. Albelo attended Florida State University and graduated in 1993 with a Bachelor of Arts in Media Production. In 1991, she earned FSU's first Bernard Sliger Presidential Scholarship to attend film school in London and a summer scholarship to the Institut Catholique de Paris.

Albelo moved to Paris, France in 1993 where she worked as an independent filmmaker, journalist, and prominent nightlife promoter under the pseudonym, "Anna La Chocha". Frequent collaborators include Canal+, Radio Nova, and Radio FG. In 2008, Albelo directed the short film The Turkey starring the famed French singer, Sheila. The film screened at the Cannes Film Festival's Critic's Week and the Clermont-Ferrand International Short Film Festival, as well as, broadcast as part of the series, "Ecrire pour un chanteur" on Canal+.

Albelo directed the 2013 lesbian film Who's Afraid of Vagina Wolf?, co-starring herself, Guinevere Turner, and Janina Gavankar. The film was met with praise in LGBT communities and film communities alike, winning multiple awards. Marcie Branco in Curve wrote that "[the film] is a contemplative yet comical take on a question the media says is plaguing women these days: Can we have it all?" In the London Evening Standard, the film's plot and the seductive nature of the character portrayed by Albelo was noted as "charmingly bizarre".

In addition to directing, Albelo established her own production company, Burning Bra Productions and produced the Madeleine Olnek biopic on Emily Dickinson, Wild Nights with Emily. Her recent production, Rosa written and directed by Palestinian-American independent filmmaker, Suha Araj starring Jackie Cruz (Orange Is The New Black) was a 2021 Oscar qualifying short action film and the 2018 pitch winner of the Through Her Lens Tribeca/ Channel Women’s Filmmaker Program. It was produced by Maryam Keshavarz's Marakesh Film and Albelo's Burning Bra Productions.

A longtime LGBTQ activist, Albelo created the Lesbian Culture Club which was launched on National Coming Out Day, October 11, 2016 in Los Angeles. The event was created in support of the Los Angeles LGBT Center's Audre Lorde Health Program and other Center programs and services for women and girls. In 2019, Albelo co-founded with Jose Atencio and Scott Bernardez the 501c organization, Wynwood Pride in Miami, Florida. At first, the creation of the new pride festival caused local controversy among existing LGBTQ organisations. The Miami New Times later reported, “Art and activism were prominently featured at Wynwood Pride, which included an artist showcase of local LGBTQ artists and a space organizers named the “Community Fun Village," where local nonprofits highlighted their work.” The 501c posted the results of the 2019 inaugural event with an estimated 50,000 people in attendance and a line-up composed of 135+ artist of which an estimated 83% were local, 78% were people of color, 77% identified as LGBTQ+, and 57% identified as female. The funds raised were dispersed in part to the 2019 non-profit partners: Pridelines, Astraea Lesbian Foundation for Justice, and Survivors' Pathways.

Due to the Covid 19 pandemic, the 2020 Wynwood Pride became a digital event attracting approximately 35,086 live viewers and featuring 138+ artists of which 72% were people of color, 54% identified as female, 38% identified as male, and 8% identified as non-binary. The online philanthropy, in partnership with Plus1.org was specifically geared in response to the ongoing black lives matter movement in direct support of: The Bail Project, Contigo Fund, Equal Justice Initiative, and Impact Justice.

== Filmography ==
=== Film ===
Year	Title	Acting Role	Notes
1996	Koko		Director; writer
2008	The Turkey/ La Dinde		Director; selection: Cannes Film Festival
2010	HOOTERS!	The Invstigator	Director; writer; producer
2010	The Owls		Director: producer:EPK
2014	Who's Afraid of Vagina Wolf?	Anna/George	Director; story by; producer
2015	Vagina is the Warmest Color	Vee	Director; writer; producer; short film
2018	Wild Nights with Emily		Producer, 2020 Spirit Award nominee
2020	The Never List		Producer
2020	Rosa		Producer; Oscar qualifying short action film

== See also ==
- Who's Afraid of Vagina Wolf?
