= Guinevere Turner =

American actress and screenwriter

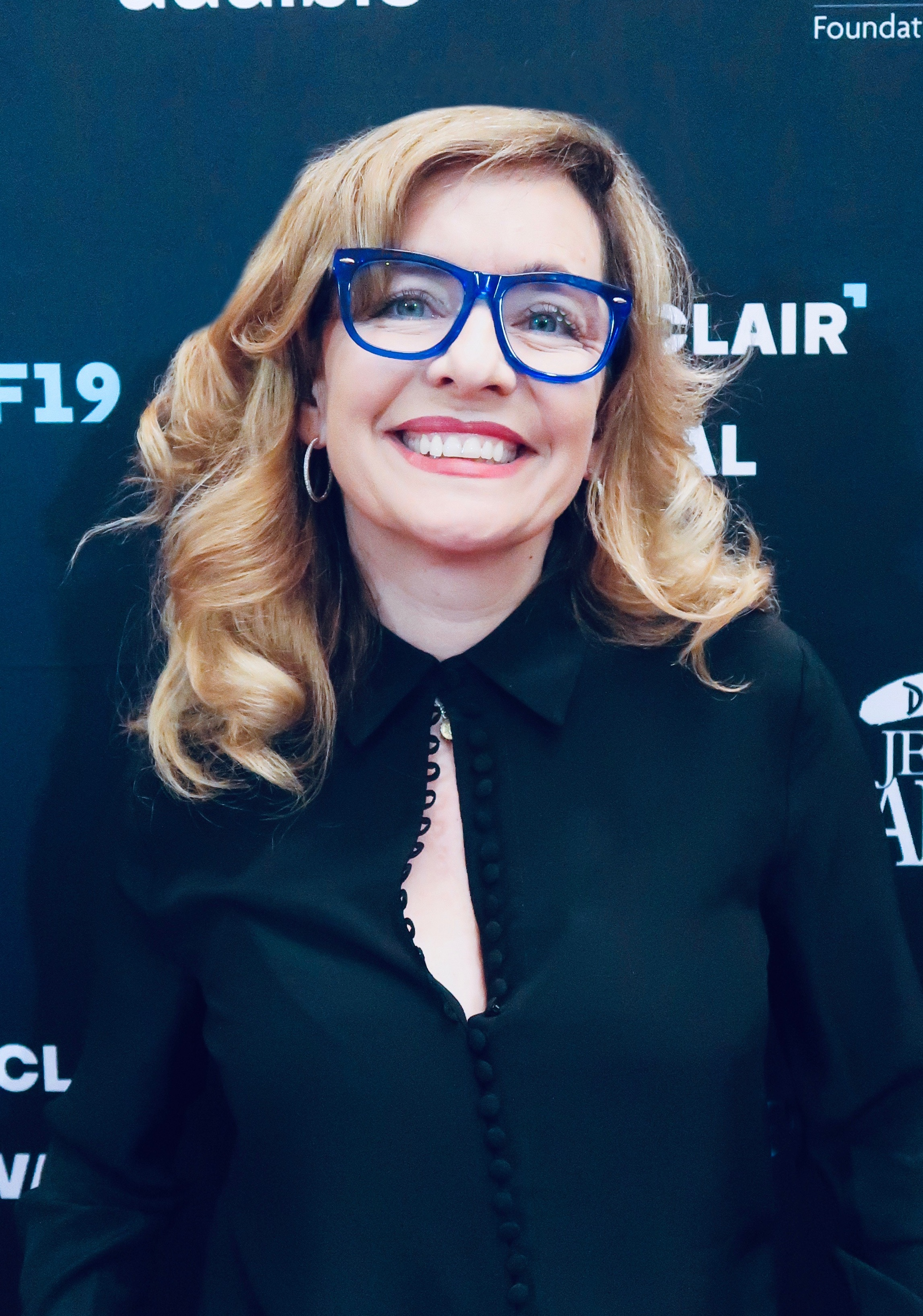
- Turner in 2019
- Born: Guinevere Jane Turner; May 23, 1968 (age 58); Boston, Massachusetts, U.S.
- Education: Sarah Lawrence College
- Occupations: Actress; screenwriter; film director
- Years active: 1994–present

Guinevere Jane Turner (born May 23, 1968) is an American actress, screenwriter, and film director. She co-wrote the films American Psycho and The Notorious Bettie Page with director Mary Harron, and she played the lead role of the dominatrix Tanya Cheex in Preaching to the Perverted. She was a story editor and played recurring character Gabby Deveaux on Showtime's The L Word.

== Early life ==
Turner was born in Boston and is the oldest of six children. Her maternal grandmother, Elizabeth Hobbs Turner, was a member of the United States Marine Corps in 1944 during World War II.

Turner spent the first eleven years of her life as part of the Lyman Family, raised in various communes around the U.S. with over 100 members who were devotees of Mel Lyman. In accordance with the customs of the Lyman Family, Turner was not raised by her mother, but she and her younger sister were eventually ejected from the Family after their mother chose to leave. Turner considered rejoining the group when she was 18, but eventually chose to attend college.

== Career ==
Turner co-wrote and co-produced her first film, 1994's Go Fish, with her then-girlfriend, director Rose Troche. Turner also starred in the film, portraying a young woman named Max whose friends help her find a new girlfriend, Ely, portrayed by VS Brodie. Director Kevin Smith was a fan of the movie, particularly a scene in it wherein, in an imagined sequence, some of a character's friends chastise her for "selling out" and sleeping with a man, and used it as an inspiration for his own take on a similar theme in his own film Chasing Amy. Turner has cameos in both Chasing Amy and Smith's later film Dogma. Smith also named Joey Lauren Adams' character in Smith's Mallrats after Turner. Another early film appearance was in Cheryl Dunye's 1996 independent film The Watermelon Woman.

Turner and I Shot Andy Warhol director Mary Harron wrote the screenplay for the film version of Bret Easton Ellis' American Psycho, which Harron directed. Turner has a small role in the film, in which she delivers the in-joke, "I'm not a lesbian!".

A writer and story editor for the first two seasons of The L Word, Turner also made several guest appearances on the show as Alice Pieszecki's screenwriter ex-girlfriend, Gabby.

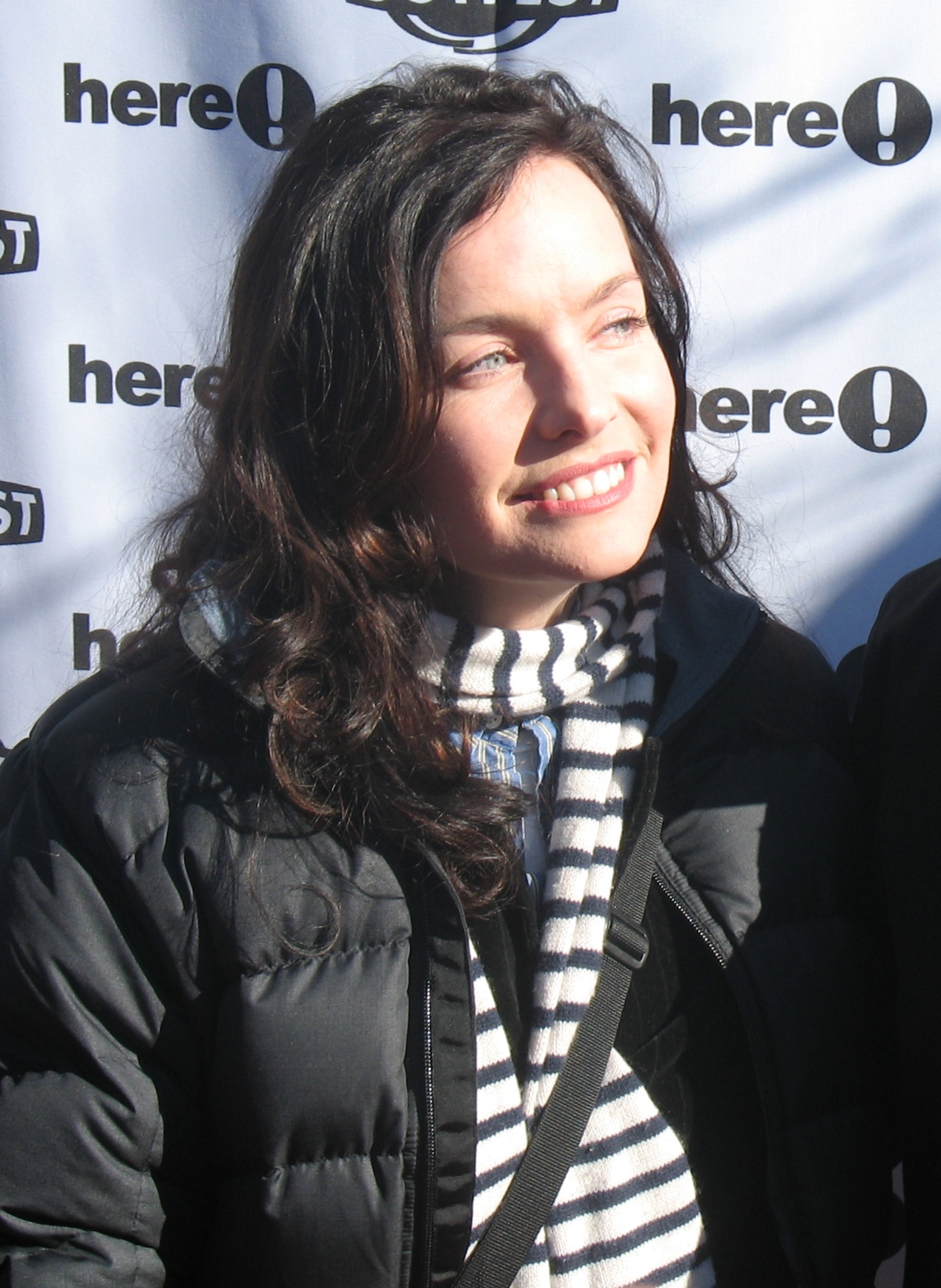
Turner in 2006

In 2005, Turner wrote the script for BloodRayne. It was nominated for a Golden Raspberry Award for Worst Screenplay in 2006. In the documentary Tales from the Script, she stated in an interview that director Uwe Boll only used about 20% of her screenplay. In 2005, she co-wrote the script for The Notorious Bettie Page with Mary Harron, who directed the film. Turner and Harron collaborated again as screenwriter and director, respectively, on the 2018 film Charlie Says.

Turner's first foray into web television was the 2008 online drama series, FEED, directed by Mel Robertson, launched on AfterEllen.com. In 2014, she appeared alongside Nayo Wallace, Candis Cayne and Cathy DeBuono in Jane Clark's horror comedy film Crazy Bitches.

Turner has directed several short films, such as Hummer and Hung, which have appeared in many international film festivals.

In 2019, The New Yorker published an essay by Turner entitled "My Childhood in a Cult," about growing up in the Lyman Family. Four years later, Turner published a memoir, When the World Didn't End, expanding greatly on the story of her youth, and continuing on to her adolescence in an abusive household. Kirkus Reviews called the book "a moving portrait of a bizarre childhood written with emotional nuance and bittersweet deliverance ... The author’s prose is reflective, vivid, and confessional, a rich combination full of striking imagery."

== Personal life ==
Turner is a lesbian. She currently teaches screenwriting courses at Syracuse University.

== Filmography ==
=== Film ===
- 1994: Go Fish (writer, actress)
- 1996: The Watermelon Woman (actress)
- 1997: Chasing Amy (actress)
- 1997: Latin Boys Go to Hell (actress)
- 1997: Preaching to the Perverted (actress)
- 1998: Dante's View (actress)
- 1999: Dogma (actress)
- 2000: American Psycho (writer, actress)
- 2001: The Fluffer (actress)
- 2001: Spare Me (short film, writer-director)
- 2002: Pipe Dream (actress)
- 2002: Stray Dogs (actress)
- 2004: Hummer (Short film, writer-director-actress)
- 2005: Dani and Alice (actress)
- 2005: BloodRayne (writer)
- 2005: Hung (short film, writer-director-actress)
- 2005: The Notorious Bettie Page (writer)
- 2005: Beyond Lovely (short film, actress)
- 2006: A Lez in Wonderland (Broute-minou à Palm Springs) (short film, actress)
- 2007: Itty Bitty Titty Committee (actress)
- 2008: Late (short film, writer-director)
- 2008: Little Mutinies (short film, actress)
- 2008: Quiet Please (short film, director)
- 2008: She Likes Girls 3 (video, director)
- 2010: The Owls (short film, actress)
- 2012: Breaking the Girls (writer)
- 2013: Who's Afraid of Vagina Wolf? (actress)
- 2014: Crazy Bitches (actress)
- 2016: Superpowerless (actress)
- 2017: Post-Apocalyptic Potluck (short film, writer-director)
- 2018: Charlie Says (writer)
- 2020: I Am Fear (actress)
- 2022: Candy Land (actress)
- 2024: Saint Clare (writer)

=== Television ===
- 2004–2005: The L Word (TV series, writer)
- 2016: Sugar (web series, director, episode: Chapter 5)

== See also ==
- List of female film and television directors
- List of lesbian filmmakers
- List of LGBT-related films directed by women
