= Air Force Two (disambiguation) =

Air Force Two is the call sign for any U.S. Air Force aircraft carrying the Vice President of the United States.

Air Force Two may also refer to:

- Boeing C-32, the Boeing 757-based aircraft most often used as Air Force Two
- In Her Line of Fire, a film known as Air Force Two in several countries
- Japanese Air Force Two

== See also ==
- Second Air Force (2AF), a USAF numbered air force
