= Crazy Bitches =

2014 film by Jane Clark

- Film poster
- Directed by: Jane Clark
- Written by: Jane Clark
- Produced by: Jane Clark; Johnny Carrillo; Tara Carbajal
- Starring: Samantha Colburn; Cathy DeBuono; Andy Gala; Liz McGeever; Victoria Profeta; Guinevere Turner; Nayo Wallace; Mary Jane Wells
- Cinematography: Cecilia Guerrero
- Edited by: Jane Clark
- Music by: Charlton Pettus
- Production company: FilmMcQueen Productions
- Distributed by: Gravitas Ventures
- Release dates: June 26, 2014 (Frameline); February 14, 2015
- Running time: 100 minutes
- Country: United States
- Language: English

Crazy Bitches is a 2014 American comedy horror slasher film written, directed, edited, and co-produced by Jane Clark. It stars an ensemble cast consisting of Samantha Colburn, Cathy DeBuono, Andy Gala, Liz McGeever, Victoria Profeta, Guinevere Turner, Nayo Wallace and Mary Jane Wells.

Crazy Bitches premiered at the Frameline Film Festival on June 26, 2014, and was released on DVD and Blu-ray on February 14, 2015.

It was re-cut and re-released as the first season, subtitled Live Vain, Die Ugly, of a web series of the same name, which premiered on August 16, 2019. Season two, subtitled Spa Days, was released later that same year.

== Plot ==
Vivianna is making out with ranch hand, Gareth. She receives a call from a man she is having an affair with. The man informs her that he wants to break up with her and that he has informed his wife Alice of his infidelity. It is hinted that Vivianna knows Alice. Vivianna tries to convince him to stay on the call but the man disconnects the call. Vivianna is attacked and murdered by a man dressed in black.

Belinda, Alice's sister is dropped to the airport by Eddie, who turns out to be Alice's husband. It is revealed that their marriage is in trouble and Alice would be joining her sister next day due Eddie's business. Meanwhile, four friends Cassie, Taylor, Dorri and Princess meet up at the airport and head for the ranch to spend weekend to celebrate Alice's birthday. They are not happy that Alice will be joining them one day late. At the ranch Gareth hits on all the girls and it is apparent that Princess is interested in him and Cassie doesn't like him.

BJ and Minnie are already in the cabin. They are soon joined by Cassie, Taylor, Dorri and Princess. Minnie has an Intuitive mind and she sense that Dorri might be suffering from relapse of cancer. BJ and the girls settle down for dinner and slowly secrets start to tumble out. It is revealed that Princess was in extra-marital relationship with Eddie. They also discuss Vivianna's absence but nobody seems to be interested in it. Cassie and BJ turn out to be homosexuals.

During dinner Taylor accidentally spills some wine over the carpet, when they start cleaning it. Blood stains can be seen on the floors under replacement carpets. BJ explains to the girls that 15 years earlier mass murder had occurred in the same house. The teenage girls murdered on that day were having a sleepover. The killer was dubbed "Vanity Killer" and he/she was never found.

Finally Belinda arrives at the ranch and they all decide to retire for the night. Gareth arrives at the ranch and has sex with Princess. Cassie tries to make out with Taylor, but Taylor rejects her advances. Next day morning the girls bicker again and this time it is revealed that Belinda was also in relationship with Eddie. Belinda and Cassie trade insults, Belinda gets angry and walks away into the woods, where she is attacked and murdered by the man dressed in black. The killer uses her high heel sandals to kill her.

Gareth comes back to warn the group about the incoming storm and hits on Taylor, she seems uninterested but this makes Princess jealous. The group goes out to the town to have lunch, Dorri opts out of it. The group returns to the ranch and find all of Belinda's stuff missing. Gareth comes back and again hits on Taylor, this causes Taylor and Princess to get into a physical fight but the girls finally make peace sharing their secrets. The group decides to retire for the night. Cassie again tries to make out with Taylor but is rebuked. It is now revealed that Cassie and Taylor had made out with Eddie. Princess is murdered by the killer at night and he cuts her scalp.

An angry Cassie meets Minnie on her way back and they make out. Alice finally arrives at the ranch and meets up with rest of the folks. Next day the girls decide to go an hike. They talk and it is revealed that Eddie has had sex with all her friends (including BJ) other than Cassie, Minnie and Dorri, causing both Dorri and Alice to freak out. They realize that Taylor is missing and the groups goes out to find her and they end up finding Belinda's dead body in the woods. They go back to the house, hoping they could get network there and call for help. Cassie finds Princess's scalp and the group feels that the Vanity Killer might be back.

Cassie decides to take horse to get help from the ranch hands. The rest of the group stays inside the house. At night the killer kills Taylor by making her swallow the pearls from her necklace. It is now revealed that there are two killers and not one. Next day the group finds Taylor dead and with no signs of forced entry into the house, they decide to hike their way out of the ranch. On the way they meet dying Gareth and they start suspecting Cassie.

Further up the way they meet bloodied Cassie on the way, thinking she is behind all the killings BJ hits her on the head killing her. A stressed out BJ applies his face cream which burns his face and kills him instantaneously. Finally Dorri reveals that she is responsible for killings that happen 15 years earlier and the ones happening now. She explains that the girls who came to the ranch 15 years earlier were rude to her and the ranch hand's son helped her take revenge. She further explains she killed all the friends because they cheated Alice by having sex with her husband. She did this because Alice was the only person who was kind to her during her childhood. She further reveals that she is dying and she wanted to clean things up before she dies. Dorri then goes on to kill herself.

A cop finally explains to Minnie and Alice that Cassie is dead. He further explains that both the homicides are related. Eddie tries to win Alice back but she decides to start her life afresh.

== Cast ==
- Samantha Colburn as Taylor
- Cathy DeBuono as Cassie
- Andy Gala as B.J.
- Liz McGeever as Minnie
- Victoria Profeta as Alice
- Guinevere Turner as Belinda
- Nayo Wallace as Dorri
- Cari Downey as Young Dorri
- Mary Jane Wells as Princess
- Blake Berris as Gareth
- Candis Cayne as Vivianna
- David Fumero as Eddie
- Johnny Carrillo as Gardner
- Curt Smith as Detective Neville
- Trey McCurley as Guy
- Eddie Daniels as Pamela
- Riley Berris as Sylvie
- Malaak Hattab as Farusa
- Alyssa Elle Steinacker as Molly
- Gabrielle Malmazada as Katie "Skateboard Katie"
- Jennifer Corday as Officer Daniels
- Shaeda Moghaddam as Shaeda
- Alex Miller as Young Guy

== Production ==
Shooting for the movie took place at Great Spirits Ranch, nestled in the mountains of Malibu.

== Reception ==
The film had its world premiere took place image June 26, 2014, during the Frameline Film Festival. The reviews for the film were mostly negative.

The movie won an award for the Best Ensemble Cast at QCinema's QAwards. The movie was nominated for Best Screenplay Award and Nayo Wallace was nominated for Best Supporting Actress Award at the Macabre Faire Film Festival. It was also nominated for the Best Film Award at the Fantasporto Film Festival.

Critical responses varied. Andrew Marshall of Starburst described the film as relatively low-key for a slasher and wrote that its focus on female relationships gave it a perspective often missing from the genre. Kim Hoffman of AfterEllen praised the film's whodunit structure and ensemble of LGBT performers, while Brent Simon of ShockYa criticized the film as a tonal misfire.

== Web series format and season two ==
The movie went on to be recut as season one of a web series and a new season two was produced. Returning cast members played new parts. Season two was filmed on location at the Klentner Ranch, California.

Both seasons of these short episodes were released in 2019.

== Cast of season two ==
- Guinevere Turner as Rhea Alcott Thomas
- Samantha Colburn as Taylor
- Cathy DeBuono as Teddi
- Jennifer Corday as Bessie
- John W McLaughlin as Liam
- Johnny Carrillo as Gardner
- Shaeda Moghaddam as Shaeda
- Mandahla Rose as Pandora
- Karl E Landler as Louis
- John-Paul Lavoisier as Charlie
- Jessica Graham as Eleni
- Lianna Taylor as Bethany
- Justin Klentner as Cam
- Rohvi Rodriguez as Stacey
- Sheila Ellis as Rhea's Driver
- Luke Klentner as Oliver
- Kari Alison Hodge as Aggie
- Buck Angel as David
- Tenn Buick as Bart
- Victoria Charters as Constance
- Drew Ochsner as Drew
