= Mandahla Rose =

Australian actress

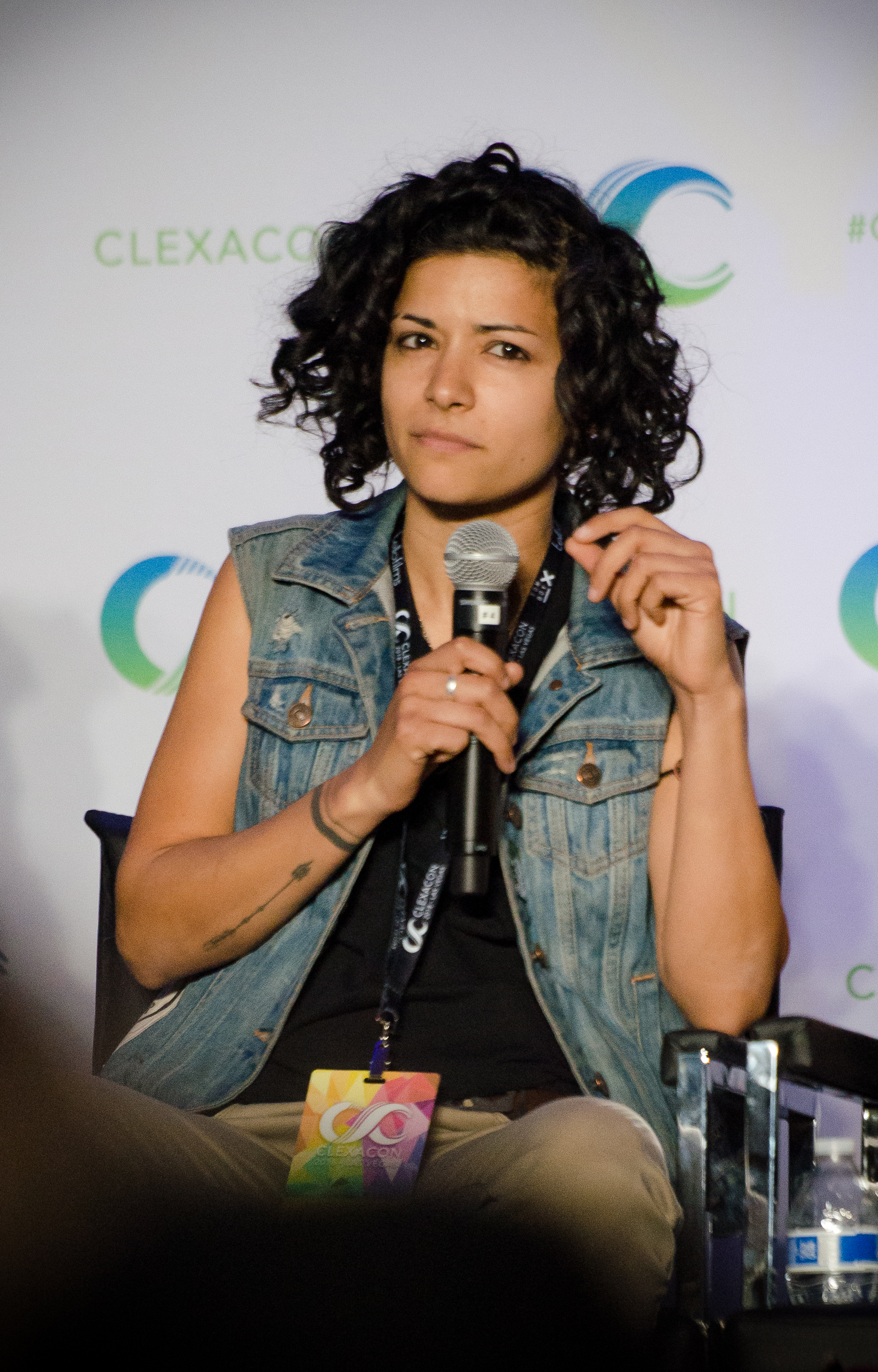
- Born: Mandahla Rose; Adelaide, Australia
- Occupation: Actress
- Years active: 2006–present

Mandahla Rose is an Australian actress best known for the films All About E (2015), Forever Not Maybe (2020), and For the Love of Jessee (2020). Her performances in Forever Not Maybe and the short film The Paradise Road (2024) earned her Best Actress awards in 2020 and 2024, respectively. Other notable credits include the Australian/British film Oranges and Sunshine (2010).

== Career ==
Rose's appearances in commercials and music videos led to minor film roles, including a part alongside Emily Watson in Oranges and Sunshine (2010). These opportunities eventually led to the lead role in Louise Wadley's 2015 independent film, All About E.

Following the success of All About E, Rose established professional connections in Los Angeles, moving there in 2016. Her career in California expanded to include lead roles in For the Love of Jessee (2020) and Forever Not Maybe (2020), with the latter earning her a Best Actress award at NoHo Cinefest.

Rose is recognized for her work in over 15 short films and 10 web series, often playing lesbian characters. Notable projects include Crazy Bitches (2019), the Emmy Award-winning Venice: the Series (2019–2025) and The Paradise Road (2024), for which she won Best Actress at the 10th Hollywood International Diversity Film Festival. In February 2025, Rose reprised her role as Zoë in season seven of Venice: the Series following the show's six-year hiatus.

Rose has several credits as crew on TV and film productions, usually serving as production assistant or first or second camera assistant.

== Early life ==
Rose lived in foster care from the age of six. Between the ages of eight and nineteen, she was in a long-term foster placement under two nuns from the Dominican Order.

== Personal life ==
Rose dates women. She was in a relationship with bisexual actress Nicole Pacent for five years after meeting at Clexacon and co-parents a son with her. Rose and Pacent appeared in the 2019 web series Passage.

== Selected filmography ==
=== Films ===
Year	Title	Role	Notes	Ref
2010	Oranges and Sunshine	Nurse	Feature film	
2015	All About E	Elmira 'E' Malouf	Feature film	
2015	A Month of Sundays	Young PA	Feature film	
2017	August in the City	Clementine	Short	
2018	Alice & Iza	Iza	Short	
2020	For the Love of Jessee	Sage Smith	Feature film	
2020	Forever Not Maybe	Sasha Austin	Feature film	
2022	Butch Pal for the Straight Gal	Sam	Short	
2024	The Paradise Road	Shae	Short	
2024	Scars	Amy Green	Feature film	
2025	Double Booking	Mia	Feature film	

=== Web series ===
Year	Title	Role	Notes	Ref
2019	Crazy Bitches	Pandora	Season 2	
2019	Passage	Diana Atwell		
2019 – 2025	Venice: The Series	Zoë	Season 6 & 7	
2019 – 2025	BIFL	Sarah	Season 1 & 2	
2020	Dating in Place	Denali		
2023	Scare BNB: The Hosts	June		
2024	As Love Goes	Elise		
