= Who's Afraid of Vagina Wolf? =

2013 film by Anna Margarita Albelo

- Film poster; shows the lead character Anna in a vagina suit on stage, backed by "the Vaginettes"
- Directed by: Anna Margarita Albelo
- Written by: Michael Urban
- Story by: Anna Margarita Albelo
- Produced by: Anna Margarita Albelo; Nicolas Brevière; Valerie Stadler; Christine Treibel
- Starring: Guinevere Turner; Carrie Preston; Agnes Albright; Janina Gavankar; Anna Margarita Albelo
- Cinematography: Alison Kelly
- Edited by: Aleshka Ferrero; Marian Jiménez; Agnès Mouchel
- Music by: Marc Tassel; Kailin Yong
- Production company: Burning Bra Productions
- Release date: June 23, 2013 (Frameline)
- Running time: 83 minutes
- Country: United States
- Languages: English; Spanish

Who's Afraid of Vagina Wolf? is a 2013 American romantic comedy film directed by Anna Margarita Albelo, in her feature directorial debut.

== Plot ==
The film opens with a quote from Virginia Woolf: "For beyond the difficulty of communicating oneself there is the supreme difficulty of being oneself". This introduces the viewer to charismatic filmmaker Anna, who is facing a midlife crisis on her 40th birthday. She has neither a job nor a girlfriend, and lives in her friend Charlie's garage in Los Angeles. She cannot get her narrative film projects off the ground, and leans on past glory as an independent filmmaker in France. She feels her never-ending search for love is what is distracting her. Wearing a vagina costume, Anna moonlights in a musical act with backup dancers the Vaginettes.

When she is about to throw in the towel, Anna meets Katia Amour, who becomes her muse. Seeking an excuse to spend more time with her young admirer, she announces that she is working on all-female remake of Who's Afraid of Virginia Woolf?, and asks Katia to star in it. As the project moves forward, Anna is forced to relinquish the role of Martha, which she wrote for herself, to diva Penelope, and take on the role of Georgie instead. Meanwhile, crew member Julia develops a crush on Anna. As the frenetic project proceeds, complications – and comedy – ensue.

== Cast ==
- Anna Margarita Albelo as Anna / George
- Guinevere Turner as Penelope / Martha
- Janina Gavankar as Katia Amour / The Stud
- Agnes Albright as Julia
- Carrie Preston as Chloe / Angel Tits
- Celeste Pechous as Charlie
- Drew Droege as Lonie
- Joel Michaely as Robert
- Jacqulynn Schmitz as property master

== Production ==
Albelo based the main character in the film, whom she portrayed, on herself. She wanted a Cuban-American filmmaker who is dedicated to lesbian and feminist culture, who (like herself) finds herself at age 40 without the means to live, and not knowing how to move her career forward. She had met Guinevere Turner in 2009, and the two became fast friends. Turner, who is both a writer and an actress, quickly got on board to help her bring her creation to life. The iconic vagina costume is actually a costume Albelo received as a gift, and used to wear for fun, to both positive and negative responses.

Albelo began writing the story in 2010, but it took two and a half additional years to create a screen-ready work. She collaborated with screenwriter Michael Urban on the script, and in 2011 launched a crowd-funding campaign. Shooting began in 2012, and post-production in 2013. According to Albelo, the film could have been done a year earlier on a lower budget, but it was important to her to create a "Hollywood grade" film, to combat the negative stereotypes that lesbian films are "niche" and "scrappy" low-budget productions, which in turn impact the ability of the genre to attract funding.

== Release ==
The film debuted in the United States on June 23, 2013, at the Frameline Film Festival, then went on to additional festivals in Europe. Who's Afraid of Vagina Wolf? was released to theaters in France on March 19, 2014. It garnered enthusiastic responses, and went on to additional screenings in the United States and around the world.

== Reception ==
In his Outfest review, Nicholas Bell proclaimed the film "anything but a flop", said that Albelo now adds "charming" to the list of adjectives describing her work, and that Who's Afraid of Vagina Wolf? works best with its witty playfulness, and sports a variety of hilarious sequences, including cameos from Joel Michaely and Drew Droege as potential producers, informing Anna that “gays and lesbians love the same shit as everyone else.” Even better are some fiercely fantastic supporting turns from the luminous Guinevere Turner, Carrie Preston as an amusing simpleton, and a sweetly believable Agnes Olech. FilmDoo's review stated: "There are some stellar performances here, touching without being corny, managing to avoid classic tropes of both rom-coms and LGBT cinema. Who’s Afraid of Vagina Wolf? is a charming and witty comedy".

Eye for Film gave the film two out of five stars, and said that other critics had panned it, but that the reviewer thought it was "competing" in the wrong categories, and as a rom-com it is "passable". GLAM Adelaide, however, found the film "clever and heartfelt", writing that "the sly, dry comedy shines throughout the movie with a lot of subtle acts and comments breaking the tension and bumping the film along. A variety of filming techniques are craftily used to separate certain moments in the film and add extra dimensions.... The costume work of the film is especially creative and impressive with a lot of thought for the smaller details, from Anna’s constantly colorful scarves through to the bling added to the vagina costume." It its Frameline review, Front Row Reviews said of the film, "Who’s Afraid of Vagina Wolf plots its story admirably. What pulls at the heartstrings of its audience is the genuine feelings these characters seem to have for each other, that the situations are at their basis not so far fetched that they are unbelievable, and most importantly that you want Anna to succeed."

== Awards ==
- Grand Jury Prize, Best Performance for Guinevere Turner at Outfest 2013
- Audience Award for Best Comedy Feature at QFEST
