= Care Bears: Welcome to Care-a-Lot =

2012 American animated TV series

- Title card
- Also known as: Welcome to Care-a-Lot
- Genre: Adventure; Musical
- Written by: Amy Keating Rogers; Cindy Morrow; Chara Campanella; Mike Yank
- Directed by: Jeff Gordon
- Voices of: David Lodge; Patty Mattson; Doug Erholtz; Stephanie Sheh; Nayo Wallace; Jenell Slack-Wilson; Michael Sinterniklaas; Michaela Dean
- Theme music composer: Chip Whitewood; Ashley Saunig
- Opening theme: "We'll Always Be There!"
- Composers: Richard Evans; Chip Whitewood
- Country of origin: United States
- Original language: English
- No. of seasons: 1
- No. of episodes: 26

Production
- Executive producers: Jeffrey Conrad; Sarah Finn; Mike Young; Nicolas Atlan
- Producers: Peter Anderson; Ryan Wiesbrock
- Running time: 22 minutes
- Production company: American Greetings

Original release
- Network: The Hub
- Release: June 2 – December 8, 2012

Related
- Care Bears: Adventures in Care-a-lot; Care Bears & Cousins

Care Bears: Welcome to Care-a-Lot is an American children's animated television series based on the Care Bears franchise for The Hub. Produced by American Greetings and animated by MoonScoop Entertainment, (Note: Animation outsourced to Xentrix Studios and Crest Animation Productions) the series centers on seven teddy bears named "Care Bears" who go on adventures throughout the magical land of Care-a-Lot, as well as helping children who have issues they need to solve.

This was the first television series in the franchise to be computer-animated, although several films had previously been animated this way before the show's announcement. The show ran for a single season of twenty-six episodes, which aired on The Hub weekly from June 2 until December 8, 2012.

Despite the series not being renewed for a second season after The Hub rebranded into Discovery Family, Netflix commissioned a continuation of the series titled Care Bears & Cousins, which ran for two six-episode seasons: the first season was released on November 6, 2015 and the second season was released on February 5, 2016. This series continues where Welcome to Care-a-Lot left off and reintroduces four of the Care Bear Cousins as central characters.

== Synopsis ==
Set in Care-a-Lot, a magical land in the clouds, Tenderheart Bear, Cheer Bear, Grumpy Bear, Share Bear, Harmony Bear, Funshine Bear and new playful, curious cub Wonderheart Bear all go on adventures that emphasize messages of caring and sharing. Human children from Earth often visit Care-a-Lot and participate in new adventures and valuable lessons learned. The Care Bears' mischievous King Beastly often attempts to make trouble for the bears.

== Characters ==
=== Main ===
- Tenderheart Bear (voiced by David Lodge) – The eldest and wisest of the Care Bears. Whether it's advice or understanding, a hug or a nudge, he knows just what kids need to help them share their feelings. His belly badge is perfect for the job: a red heart. The de facto leader of the Care Bears, he was granted the power of teleportation by the Great Giving Bear during the Great Giving Festival. He is Wonderheart Bear's uncle.
- Cheer Bear (voiced by Patty Mattson) – The happiest bear in Care-a-Lot. The resident cheerleader, she often displays a go-for-it attitude, makes up encouraging cheers right on the spot, and spreads joy among all who know her. When not helping her friends, she can often be found tending her garden. Her belly badge is a rainbow. She was once a member of the team, "Bear Power".
- Funshine Bear (voiced by Michael Sinterniklaas) – Having fun is Funshine's number one thing. He is active, athletic and competitive when it comes to sports, cycling, skating, surfing, hiking and hang gliding. Nothing makes him happier than hanging out with friends or going on wild adventures. He makes the brightest of his days with sunny optimism and a flair for being fearless. His belly badge reflects this spirit: a smiling, shining sun. He was a member of the team, "Bear Power," and also won the Care Bearathon once.
- Grumpy Bear (voiced by Doug Erholtz) – His sardonic and often sarcastic attitude usually gives way to his caring nature and heart, not unlike the rain cloud and heart shaped raindrops that make up his belly badge. Grumpy likes to remind kids who are having a bad day that they're always loved. He is a master builder and mechanic. He was once a member of the team, "Bear Power," is a sports fan who enjoys watching the "Honey Bowl," and is a big eater.
- Harmony Bear (voiced by Nayo Wallace) – A musical bear who sings, acts, and plays every instrument. Behind her sassy, sometimes diva-like exterior is a natural leader who is all about encouraging others to do their best, especially through music. Her belly badge depicts a single flower with different colored petals. It has the power to magically fix broken instruments and can also alert her of someone in trouble from a distance. She was once a member of the team "Bear Power".
- Share Bear (voiced by Stephanie Sheh) – If Share has it, she'll share it with anyone. Carefree and loving, Share is happiest whenever she's with her friends, serving tea or baking. Her belly badge depicts two crossed heart-shaped lollipops. She has a penchant for baking treats. She lives in a tree house in the Forest of Feelings.
- Wonderheart Bear (voiced by Michaela Dean) – Although one of the youngest Care Bears, Wonderheart always wants to take part in "big bear" adventures. She's playfully curious and never short on questions. Her belly badge features a heart within hearts motif, though she doesn't initially know its full power. She is often seen carrying a stuffed bunny named Floppy Bunny and is sometimes referred to by the nickname "Little Wonder." Wonderheart was the first all-new character created for Welcome to Care-a-Lot.

=== Recurring ===
- Amigo Bear (voiced by Mark Mercado) – A red-orange bear who speaks in Spanglish and runs his own chili shack. His belly badge features an Aztec-style sun.
- Baby Hugs Bear & Baby Tugs Bear (voiced by Olivia Hack and Stephanie Sheh) – Pale pink and pale blue Care Bear cubs respectively. Despite being younger than Wonderheart, they develop their belly badge powers before her, being allowed to be members of the Cub Bouts, the junior division of the Belly Badge Bouts. Unlike earlier incarnations of the franchise, Tugs' belly badge now features a red heart inside a yellow star, while Hugs' has a yellow star inside a pink heart. Both Cubs are now seen without their signature diapers.
- Bashful Heart Bear – A sea green bear who tends to appear in background roles. His belly badge is of a heart peeking out from behind a cloud with a rainbow extending outward. He does not have any speaking roles.
- Bedtime Bear (voiced by Michael Sinterniklaas) – A light blue bear who is active at night, but sleepy during the day. If he's awakened, he gets even more grouchy than Grumpy and if his blanket is taken, he can sleepwalk to try and find it. His belly badge is of a crescent moon and a star.
- Best Friend Bear (voiced by Olivia Hack) – An orchid-colored bear who is a member of a Belly Badge Bouts team. She tends to be used in background roles, and her belly badge features a rainbow linking a star to a heart.
- Birthday Bear (voiced by Michael Sinterniklaas) – A golden-yellow bear who likes to celebrate birthdays, and also tends to be used in background roles. His belly badge depicts a pink cupcake with a candle on top.
- Champ Bear (voiced by Doug Erholtz) is a dark blue bear who is athletic and excels at every sport, and is a rival to Funshine. His belly badge is a trophy adorned with a star.
- Good Luck Bear (voiced by Peter Anderson, one of the show's producers) – A green bear who believes that luck is within you, even with his power to provide good luck himself. He tends to be used as background filler, being part of two teams in two episodes – the Belly Badge Bouts and the Bear-a-Lots. He speaks in an Irish accent (the first time the character had such an accent since the 1980s series) and has a four leaf clover belly badge.
- Grams Bear (voiced by Jennifer Darling) – A turquoise elder Care Bear. She is portrayed differently and looks different in this series compared to previous incarnations of the character, being turquoise instead of lavender-gray, speaks in a stereotypical southern U.S. regional dialect and accent, wears glasses on the end of her nose and a pink shawl with yellow hearts around her shoulders, walks with a cane, and having her belly badge power (while retaining the rose tied with a yellow ribbon design) being able to restore other belly badges that are temporarily out of commission.
- Great Giving Bear (voiced by David Lodge) – A red bear who is the Care-a-Lot equivalent of Santa Claus. He has the ability to teleport to different places which he later teaches Tenderheart, and gives gifts to those who Care. His belly badge features a gift box with a heart inside.
- Laugh-A-Lot Bear (voiced by Stephanie Sheh) – An orange bear who enjoys laughter and making others laugh. She was once a member of the team, "Bear-a-Lots", and is also used as a background character, having only a very minor speaking role. Her belly badge depicts a giggling star.
- Love-A-Lot Bear (voiced by Nayo Wallace) – A pink bear who enjoys sharing love. She tends to be used as background filler, being part of two teams in two episodes – the Belly Badge Bouts and the Bear-a-Lots. Her belly badge is two overlapping hearts – one red and one pink.
- Secret Bear (voiced by Stephanie Sheh) – A magenta bear who is known for keeping secrets (hence why she speaks in a whisper). She is the co-detective of the Care Bear Detective Agency and is also used in several background roles. She has a heart-shaped lock belly badge.
- Shiver Me Timbear (voiced by David Lodge) – A brown bear resembling Tenderheart who is a legendary pirate captain and one of Tenderheart's Care Bear ancestors. His belly badge features a heart and crossbones.
- Surprise Bear (voiced by Melissa Mable) – A lavender bear who likes to surprise people. She makes very minor background roles in the series. Her belly badge depicts a star popping out of a heart-stamped jack-in-the-box.
- Sweet Dreams Bear (voiced by Olivia Hack) – A mauve bear (pale purple in merchandise) who has the power to send down sweet dreams one by one to each Care Bear and believes that all dreams, good or bad, are a natural part of the dreamscape. Sometimes, her power can be drained by a naturally occurring phenomenon known as the "plainbow," but can be restored using other Care Bears's belly badge powers. She speaks in a Southern American accent and her belly badge depicts a pink crescent moon nestled inside a cloud with a heart on it, which takes the form of a rainbow ray attached to a crescent moon.
- Thanks-A-Lot Bear (voiced by Melissa Mable) – A teal bear who is thankful for anything. She is the co-detective of the Care Bear Detective Agency and is also used in several background roles. Her catchphrase is "Thanks a lot!" and is sometimes said sarcastically. Her belly badge depicts a star riding on a rainbow.
- Wish Bear (voiced by Melissa Mable) – A light turquoise bear who enjoys making and granting wishes. Much like Good Luck and Love-A-Lot, she tends to be used as background filler, being part of two teams in two episodes – the Belly Badge Bouts and the Bear-a-Lots. Her belly badge depicts a smiling, shooting starbuddy.

=== Bears who only appear on merchandise ===
- Friend Bear – A light orange bear whose belly badge depicts two crossed sunflowers.
- Hopeful Heart Bear – A light magenta bear whose belly badge depicts a pink heart encircled by multicolored rays of light.

=== Other Care-a-Lot Residents ===
- King Beastly (voiced by Doug Erholtz) – A mischievous and arrogant beast who wears a crown, he likes to cause trouble in Care-a-Lot, but has natural talent if allowed to shine.
  - Beasties (voiced by Michael Sinterniklaas and Doug Erholtz) are Beastly's two minions.

=== Care Kids ===
- Penny (voiced by Katherine Shepler) – A girl who loves high speed.
- Phoebe (voiced by Isabella Briscoe) – A shy girl with a talent for singing.
- Clem (voiced by Sean-Ryan Petersen) – A boy with anger issues. He was later summoned to Care-a-Lot by Beastly.
- Hayden (voiced by Elle Labadie) – A young girl with an interest in baking. Loyal to Share Bear, she will keep quiet even if it means taking the blame for a friend's bad behavior. It is later revealed that she has a twin who is identical in appearance, though hardly identical in personality.
- Jayden (voiced by Katherine Shepler) – Hayden's twin sister, she seems to be somewhat more sporty and is at times competitive with Hayden.
- Zack (voiced by Mason Malina) – A boy who is into extreme sports. In one episode, he visits Care-a-Lot to compete in an annual competition.
- Riley (voiced by Katherine Shepler) – A girl who often makes things up.
- Olivia (voiced by Zoe Miner) – A girl who sometimes has trouble finding her courage.
- Joy (voiced by Rachel Albrecht) – A girl who appeared in the episode "Sad About You". She was upset when her best friend moved away; then, she swore off friendship, but the Care Bears helped her by empathizing with her feelings.
- Susan (voiced by Sami Staitman) – A girl with blonde hair who enjoys playing video games, but finds that work can be satisfying when she actually puts forth the effort.
- Kaylee (voiced by Olivia Hack) – A girl, who, in one episode, moved to a new school from Hawaii. She plays the ukulele, but is being bullied by a girl named Madison.
- Madison (voiced by Chiara Zanni) – A girl who plays the guitar. When Kaylee joined her class, she started bullying her because she felt jealous and felt that she had stolen her spotlight by playing the ukulele. Madison's voice actress, Chiara Zanni, voiced Wish Bear in the previous Care Bears series, Care Bears: Adventures in Care-a-lot
- Peter (voiced by Sam Adler) – A boy who is known to always follow rules and who lives by the guidelines of a written rule book. When he arrives in Care-a-Lot, Funshine Bear and Grumpy Bear encourage him to cut loose and he becomes a rebellious spirit with the declared intent of breaking all of Care-a-Lot's rules. After getting into a troubling situation, he learns an important lesson.
- Aiden (voiced by Colin Depaula) – A boy who uses a wheelchair because his legs haven't worked since birth. He enjoys a variety of sporting activities and loves trying out new ones. He prefers for anyone who might have questions about him or his wheelchair to simply ask, rather than avoid him or keep silent.
- Isabella (voiced by Katherine Shepler) – A young girl who has issues with responsibility, and only learns about its importance by helping Wonderheart.
- Ethan (voiced by Sean-Ryan Petersen) – A child actor who arrives with the intent of helping with the Great Giving day pageant, but ends up causing rebellion and turning it into a one person show about himself.
- Hannah (voiced by Sami Staitman) – A girl who knows a lot about camping, but is scared of actually doing it herself, for a number of reasons. She eventually earns an honorary Care Camping stamp.

== Episodes ==
No.	Title	Directed by	Written by	Storyboard by	Original release date	Prod. code
1	"Compassion – NOT!"	Jeff Gordon	Eugene Son	Jun Falkenstein, Dan Fausett and James Fujii	June 2, 2012	105
Grumpy Bear is on a quest for forbidden honey, which ends up with him being trapped, while Funshine Bear spends the day having fun with a girl named Penny, who Tenderheart Bear invites to Care-a-Lot.
2	"Show of Shyness"	Jeff Gordon	Evan Gore and Heather Lombard	Gloria Jenkins, John Dubiel and Phil Mosness	June 9, 2012	104
Harmony Bear loses her voice before a concert, and a shy girl named Phoebe must convince King Beastly not to disrupt the show.
3	"Sleuth of Bears"	Jeff Gordon	Steven Aranguren	Gloria Y. Jenkins, Kevin Frank and Joe Horne	June 16, 2012	108
A pumpkin carving slumber party is being held by the female Care Bears, but disaster strikes when Grumpy Bear's Care-O-Van gets attacked and the Ghost of Benafare has been unleashed!
4	"When the Bear's Away"	Jeff Gordon	Chara Campanella	Douglas McCarthy, Phil Mosness and Mary Hanley	June 23, 2012	107
Trouble strikes during Tenderheart Bear's vacation when King Beastly invites a troublesome child.
5	"Jealous Tea"	Jeff Gordon	Cindy Morrow	Julia Briemle, Doris Umschaden and Douglas McCarthy	June 30, 2012	102
When Grumpy Bear ends up making a successful baked goods business, Share Bear gets jealous and ends up causing her Care Kid friend Hayden to do lots of work for her.
6	"Shunshine"	Jeff Gordon	Cindy Morrow	Gloria Y. Jenkins	July 7, 2012	110
When Funshine Bear beats the other Bears in the Care Bearatlon, Funshine lets his ego get the better of him.
7	"Feeling Flu"	Jeff Gordon	Chara Campanella	Julia Briemle	July 14, 2012	111
Grumpy Bear, Share Bear, Cheer Bear, Funshine Bear, Wonderheart Bear, and King Beastly get an illness called the "Feeling Flu", which swaps their personalities with one another.
8	"Untruths and Consequences"	Jeff Gordon	Mike Yank	Phil Mosness, Douglas McCarthy and Kevin Frank	July 21, 2012	113
All the Bears think that the lies coming from a girl named Riley are true, but Wonderheart Bear ends up being the only one who knows that Wonderheart is lying.
9	"Bearied Treasure"	Jeff Gordon	Aaron Vattano	John Dubiel, Andrew Dickman and Joe Horne	July 28, 2012	114
The Bears attempt to find a treasure chest, but greed ends up becoming their main motivation for finding it.
10	"Cheeri No"	Jeff Gordon	Ross Berger	Julia Briemle and Doris Umschaden	August 4, 2012	120
Cheer Bear resorts to helping all the other Bears that Cheer doesn't have time to manage her own job!
11	"The Emerald Bridge"	Jeff Gordon	Amy Keating Rogers, Elana Lesser and Cliff Ruby	Gloria Jenkins, Julia Briemie, John Dubiel, Norma Klingler, Silke Bachmann, Gary Hurst and Ken Laramay	August 11, 2012	101
The Care Bears and a girl named Olivia attempt to find Care-a-Lot's trademark bridge after it goes missing.
12	"Holiday Hics"	Jeff Gordon	Corey Powell	Julia Briemle and Doris Umschaden	August 18, 2012	116
King Beastly causes Tenderheart Bear to get a curious case of hiccups that threaten to ruin the Great Giving Day.
13	"Sad About You"	Jeff Gordon	Amy Keating Rogers	John Dubiel, Kevin Frank and Gloria Jenkins	September 8, 2012	106
A girl named Joy visits Care-a-Lot, swearing off friendship when her old best friend moves away.
14	"Lazy Susan"	Jeff Gordon	Mike Yank	Doris Umschaden, Julia Briemle and Gloria Jenkins	September 15, 2012	112
A girl named Susan would rather prefer to play a video game than help Share Bear harvest rainbow leaves for a special tea.
15	"Share Squared"	Jeff Gordon	Evan Gore and Heather Lombard	Kevin Frank, Scott Jeralds and Patrick Gleeson	September 22, 2012	115
Share Bear accidentally duplicates herself when sorting out something, while Hayden's twin Jayden is proving to be quite trouble for her. Can Share Bear find a way to show them the error of their ways?
16	"Bully Exposed"	Jeff Gordon	Cindy Morrow	Julia Briemle and Doris Umschaden	September 29, 2012	124
Two girls are transported to Care-a-Lot and one of them turns out to be a bully.
17	"Over Bearing"	Jeff Gordon	Corey Powell	Mark Maxey and Joseph Garcia	October 6, 2012	109
Funshine Bear and Grumpy Bear attempt to make a boy named Peter break the rules of Care-a-Lot, but they accidentally turn him into a crazy monster!
18	"In a Flash"	Jeff Gordon	Mike Yank	Kevin Frank and Scott Jeralds	October 13, 2012	122
Wonderheart Bear is tired of not knowing what her Belly Badge power can do, so Grams Bear attempts to help her.
19	"Welcome to Grump-a-Lot"	Jeff Gordon	Chara Campanella	Julia Briemle and Doris Umschaden	October 20, 2012	125
Grumpy Bear's grumpier mood accidentally makes a storm that reverses everybody’s personalities!
20	"Cub Bouts"	Jeff Gordon	Corey Powell	Gloria Jenkins	October 27, 2012	121
Wonderheart Bear wants to join Baby Hugs Bear and Tugs Bear's Cub Bouts but is upset because Wonderheart can't activate her Belly Badge yet, so Wonderheart resorts to using Tenderheart Bear's Care 'n' Share Charms to help her fake her powers, which ends up backfiring on her.
21	"More Fun With Grumpy"	Jeff Gordon	Evan Gore and Heather Lombard	Gloria Jenkins	November 3, 2012	126
When Funshine Bear finds out that his playmate, a boy named Aiden, rides a wheelchair, Grumpy Bear is certain that Grumpy won't be any fun at all.
22	"Beaconing for Attention"	Jeff Gordon	Cindy Morrow	Mark Maxey, Joe Garcia and Phil Mosness	November 10, 2012	123
Wonderheart Bear uses her Belly Badge Beacon at the wrong time, but with a girl named Isabella, they learn the meaning of responsibility.
23	"Night Bears"	Jeff Gordon	Evan Gore and Heather Lombard	John Dubiel, Larry Scholl and Andrew Dickman	November 17, 2012	103
When Sweet Dreams accidentally sends out bad dreams into Care-a-Lot and creates a plainbow, the other Bears must stop them from becoming reality.
24	"Holi-Stage"	Jeff Gordon	Corey Powell	Gloria Jenkins	November 24, 2012	117
A showboy named Ethan almost ruins the Great Giving Holiday Pageant by attempting to take it over and making the show all about him.
25	"Cheering You Grump"	Jeff Gordon	Mike Yank	Kevin Frank, Phil Mosness and Gloria Jenkins	December 1, 2012	119
During the Belly Badge Scavenger Hunt, Grumpy Bear is resorted to teaming up with the delightful Cheer Bear.
26	"Care Campout"	Jeff Gordon	Chara Campanella	Phil Mosness, Joseph Garcia and John Dubiel	December 8, 2012	118
The Care Bears help a girl named Hannah conquer her fear of sleeping away from home and getting her Camping Badge.

== Movie ==
Care Bears: A Belly Badge for Wonderheart the Movie was released on home video formats on August 6, 2013. Though marketed as a direct-to-video feature-length film, the release consists of no newly produced material, but is rather a compilation of three previous installments of the television series featuring the character Wonderheart Bear, edited to run in sequence at feature length.

== Cast ==
- Michaela Dean as Wonderheart Bear
- Doug Erholtz as Grumpy Bear, Champ Bear, Beastly and Beastie #2
- David Lodge as Tenderheart Bear, Great Giving Bear and Shiver Me Timbear
- Patty Mattson as Cheer Bear
- Stephanie Sheh as Share Bear, Baby Tugs, Laugh-a-Lot Bear and Secret Bear
- Michael Sinterniklaas as Funshine Bear, Bedtime Bear, Birthday Bear and Beastie #1
- Nayo Wallace as Harmony Bear and Love-a-Lot Bear
- Peter Anderson - Good Luck Bear
- Jennifer Darling - Grams Bear
- Olivia Hack as Best Friend Bear, Baby Hugs, Sweet Dreams Bear and Kaylee
- Melissa Mable as Thanks-a-Lot Bear, Surprise Bear
- Katherine Shepler as Penny, Jayden, Riley, Isabella
- Isabella Briscoe as Phoebe
- Sean-Ryan Petersen as Clem and Ethan
- Mason Maliana as Zack
- Zoe Miner as Olivia
- Rachel Albrecht as Joy
- Sami Staitman as Susan and Hannah
- Chiara Zanni as Madison
- Sam Adler as Peter
- Collin Depula as Aiden

== Crew ==
- Michael Hack – Voice Director
- Joseph Garcia – Storyboard Artist
- Mark Maxey – Storyboard Artist
- Arun Roshan Jacob – line producer
- Liz Young – supervising producer

== Toyline ==
Partnering with American Greetings, Hasbro released a toy line based on the series in 2013. The license transitioned to Just Play in 2015, and the company produced a line of Care Bears plush (8" bean bag plush, 12" medium plush packaged with DVDs featuring episodes of the series, 16" jumbo plush, and Sing-along animatronic plush), action figures (five-packs exclusive to Toys 'R' Us, a 14-pack exclusive to Target stores, as well two-packs only released in the United Kingdom), and as of Spring 2018, six series of small blind bag figurines based on Welcome to Care-a-Lot and Care Bears and Cousins' style guide and characters. In the summer of 2016, Just Play's merchandise transitioned to the Care Bears & Cousins branding.

== Reception ==
The premiere of the series, along with Kaijudo: Rise of the Duel Masters, saw The Hub earn its best performances amongst targeted demographics in six months. In an early review of the series, Blogfully.net stated that "If you've never seen a Care Bear's [sic] episode on the Hub, you're missing out."

Cartoon Brew reported that "The Hub's earlier series, My Little Pony: Friendship Is Magic, sparked an unlikely following among adult males, otherwise known as the Brony phenomenon, but one fandom isn't enough for the Hub. They think their Care Bears show needs an adult male fanbase, too, and they're shamelessly encouraging it themselves." ComicsAlliance also said that "In case you're wondering, "Belly-Bros" is a term offered by the Hub as a potential name for the legions of male fans who'll enjoy this new Care Bears series as much as they do Friendship is Magic. If you're not feeling it, however, they're also suggesting "Care-Dudes," which sounds more like the way that William S. Preston would describe someone who works in an assisted living facility." In a statement in response to these articles, The Hub's Crystal Williams said, "...I came across your story on Cartoon Brew titled "The Hub Hopes Men Will Start Calling Themselves "Belly Bros" and "Care Dudes." In response, I wanted to let you know that this was an unapproved and unsanctioned pitch by our PR agency...The Hub TV Network nor American Greetings Properties had any knowledge of the pitch angle. It is not our intention to compare Care Bears to My Little Pony and/or the Brony community."
