= Cathy DeBuono =

American actress

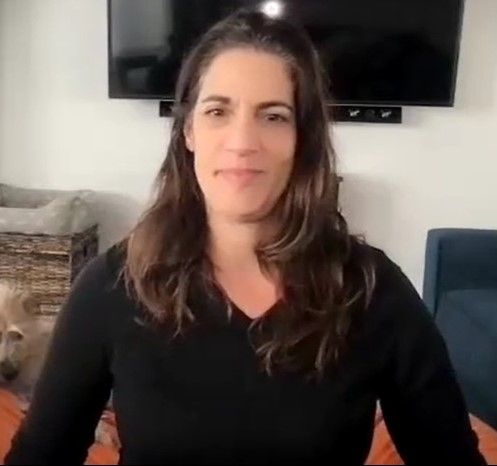
- De Buono in 2022
- Education: Antioch University Los Angeles
- Website: cathydebuono.com

Cathy DeBuono is an American actress and practicing psychotherapist.

== Biography ==
Starting in 1997, DeBuono appeared in the last three seasons of Star Trek: Deep Space Nine as M'Pella, a dabo girl in Quark's bar. DeBuono also worked on the series as a stand-in, photo double, and body double for Terry Farrell. DeBuono received no on-screen credits until her final appearance in the episode The Dogs of War. DeBuono also appeared as a background regular in several episodes of the television series Chicago Hope as a paramedic. DeBuono was involved in the comedy series Jenny, The Pretender, Pacific Blue, Martial Law, Becker and Exes and Oh's.

DeBuono is an out lesbian, and has appeared in the short film Gay Propaganda (2002), the award-winning Out at the Wedding (2007), the romantic comedy And Then Came Lola (2008), and the short drama Tremble & Spark (2008). For the 2007 short film, The Touch, she worked as associate producer and still photographer.

While working as an actress, DeBuono returned to studies at Antioch University Los Angeles. In 2003, she graduated with a Master's in Clinical Psychology, and is a member of the California Association of Marriage and Family Therapists, licensed in marriage and family therapy. Since 2011 she has hosted her own weekly radio program, Cathy Is In: The Cathy DeBuono Show, giving advice to call-in listeners on LA Talk Radio, Transformation Talk Radio and CBS New Sky Radio affiliates.

In the 2010s, DeBuono organized an effort to prevent convicted murderer Victor Paleologus from being paroled from prison. DeBuono reported that she had been approached by Paleologus in the early 2000s, and that he had pretended to be involved in casting a movie, a similar tactic to one that he used several years later to approach and assault several other women, culminating in his murder of makeup artist Kristi Johnson. DeBuono went so far as to correspond with, and then visit the imprisoned Paleologus to gather evidence against his potential release. The case, including DeBuono's activism with respect to it, was reported on Dateline in May 2024.

As of 2012, DeBuono was engaged to actress Jill Bennett, who she started dating when they co-starred in And Then Came Lola, with the two later working together on the Cathy Is In: The Cathy DeBuono Show. By 2013, the couple had split.

== Filmography ==
- Along Came Wanda (2021) as Wanda
- Crazy Bitches (2014) as Cassie, From Boxxpress
- Meth Head (2013) as Theresa Stevens
- Itsy Bitsy Spiders (2012) as Lucy (short film)
- A Perfect Ending (2012) as Dawn
- Bounty (2011 film) | Bounty (2011) as Dani Sanders (short film)
- We Have to Stop Now (2009 - 2010) as Dyna (15 episodes)
- Rose by Any Other Name... (2009) as Renee
- And Then Came Lola (2009) as Danielle
- Tremble and Spark (2009) as Charlie Frost (short film)
- 3Way (2008 - 2009) as Dr. Anglea Carlisi (2 episodes)
- Out at the Wedding (2007) as Risa
- Exes and Ohs (2007) as Becca (1 episode)
- Becker (2003) as Ms. Reynolds (1 episode)
- Gay Propaganda (2002) as Henria (short film)
- Command & Conquer: Tiberian Sun (1999) as Soldier (video game)
- Star Trek: Deep Space Nine (1997-1999) as M'Pella (16 episodes)
- Martial Law (1999) as Joy Waters (1 episode)
- Chicago Hope (1996 - 1998) as Paramedic (3 episodes)
- Pacific Blue (1998) as Matron Sara Dexter (1 episode)
- The Pretender (1998) as Staff Sergeant Alyssa Padilla (1 episode)
- Jenny (1998) as Women #1 (1 episode)
- Phoenix (1998) as Stripper
