= Louise Wadley =

Australian writer and producer

- Occupation: Filmmaker
- Notable work: All About E

Louise Wadley is an Australian film director, producer, writer, and cinematographer. She is best known for her piece All About E (2015), which she wrote and directed. Wadley is also a director and contributor to Girl’s Own Pictures, which released All About E as its debut film.

== Early life and education ==
Louise Wadley graduated from the National Film and Television School in the United Kingdom.

== Career ==
Wadley teaches film at both Sydney Film School and the city's University of Technology.

=== All About E ===
Louise Wadley describes the making of All About E (starring Mandahla Rose, Julie Billington and Brett Rogers) as somewhat of a feminist endeavor, stating the importance that "the focus is on her [E's] own journey and not just about her sexual or cultural identity." As well as being a large, ambitious-yet-low-budget production, this was also Wadley's first feature film. Wadley discusses the phenomenon of depressing films about lesbians, and that she had fun making a lesbian comedy instead. She cites inspiration from The Adventures of Priscilla, Queen of the Desert, and Muriel's Wedding.

== Personal life ==
Wadley is an out lesbian.

== Filmography ==
Year	Title	Director	Writer	Producer	Notes
1992	The Journey (documentary)	No	No	Yes	Also cinematographer
1994	Making the Break (documentary)	Yes	Yes	Yes	Also cinematographer
1996	Just A Little Crush (short)	Yes	Yes	Yes	
1997	Knickers (short)	Yes	Yes	Yes	
1998	Exporting Evil: Saddam's Hidden Weapons	No	No	Yes	
1999	To Russia With Love	Yes	Yes	No	Also co-cinematographer
2009	Panopticon	No	No	Yes	
2010	Beyond	No	No	Yes	
2011	Endure	No	No	Yes	
2014	Wayne Kerr	No	No	Yes	
2014	First Step Out	No	No	Yes	
2015	All About E	Yes	Yes	No	
2016	Burning Soul	No	No	Yes	

== Awards and nominations ==
The soundtrack of All About E was nominated for APRA Best Soundtrack Album in 2015. Wadley also won a Silver Clio Award in 2016 for To Russia With Love and "Best Short" at the Milan International Lesbian and Gay Festival for Just A Little Crush.

== See also ==
- List of Australian film directors
- List of female film and television directors
- List of lesbian filmmakers
- List of LGBT-related films directed by women
- List of Women Film Directors
