= ClexaCon =

Former annual fan convention

- Status: non-operational
- Genre: LGBTQ-focused fan convention
- Venue: Tropicana Las Vegas
- Locations: Las Vegas, Nevada
- Country: United States
- Inaugurated: March 3, 2017; 9 years ago
- Most recent: August 26–28, 2022
- Attendance: 4,100
- Organizer: Dash Productions

ClexaCon is a former annual fan convention focused on female members of the LGBTQ community. The convention is named after the "ship" name for Clarke and Lexa, characters on the CW series The 100. The inaugural ClexaCon was held at Bally's Hotel and Casino from March 3–5, 2017, in Las Vegas, Nevada.

== History ==
In 2016, the character Lexa on the CW series The 100 was killed, a move that was criticized as continuing the "dead lesbian syndrome" or "bury your gays" trope in film and television.

In response, Holly Winebarger, Nicole Hand and Emily Maroutian organized ClexaCon as an event to "move the conversation forward in a positive way." Initially planned as a gathering of roughly 100 people, word of mouth and social media allowed the convention to grow significantly larger. The original founders were later joined by Ashley Arnold and Danielle Jablonski, who presently co-own and direct the convention and its parent company, Dash Productions.

At the 2019 event, vendors, attendees, staff, and guests noticed a drastic plummet in both attendance, and quality of the show. This prompted vendors to write a letter to the new con-runners, which gained media attention from several online outlets. The term "Clexapocalypse" was coined as a result, with many drawing comparisons to DashCon.

=== Event history ===
Year	Location	Dates	Celebrity Guests	Attendance
2017	Bally's Hotel and Casino, Las Vegas, NV, U.S.	March 3–5	Amy Acker, Emily Andras, Katherine Barrell, Elise Bauman, Lynn Chen, Gabrielle Christian, Aasha Davis, Elizabeth Hendrickson, Hanan Kattan, Elizabeth Keener, Michelle Krusiac, Ali Liebert, Mandy Musgrave, Natasha Negovanlis, Jasika Nicole, Zoie Palmer, Dominique Provost-Chalkley, Eden Riegel, Shamim Sarif, Sarah Shahi, Rachel Skarsten, Alice Wu	2,200
2018	Tropicana Hotel, Las Vegas, NV, U.S.	April 5–9	Amy Acker, Emily Andras, Bryn Apprill, Marina Rice Bader, Christin Baker, Kia Barnes, Elesha Barnette, Katherine Barrell, Elise Bauman, Stephanie Beatriz, Sharon Belle, Germana Belo, Gloria Bigelow, Lucia Bollina, Crystal Chappell, Winny Clarke, Tamara Duerte, Mona Elyafi, Isabella Gomez, Caryn K. Hayes, Regina Y. Hicks, Rachel Hip-Flores, Lora Innes, Dot Marie Jones, Gloria Calderon Kellett, Chyler Leigh, Ana Paula Lima, Caity Lotz, Britta Lundin, Erica Luttrell, Elizabeth Maxwell, Bridget McManus, Natasha Negovanlis, Nicole Pacent, Zoie Palmer, Rachel Paulson, David J. Peterson, Vanessa Piazza, Dominique Provost-Chalkley, Maisie Richardson-Sellers, Mandahla Rose, Mike Royce, Rolla Selback, Sarah Shahi, Chelsea Shorte, Anna Silk, Rachel Skarsten, Haviland Stillwell, Emmanuelle Vaugier, Briana Venskus, Tina Cesa Ward, Nafessa Williams	4,100
2019	Tropicana Hotel, Las Vegas, NV, U.S.	April 11-15	Emily Andras, Ser Anzotegiu, Wendy Armitage, Marina Rice Bader, Christin Baker, Ariela Barer, Kia Barnes, Katherine Barrell, Elise Bauman, Amber Benson, Nadia Bjorlin, Lesley-Ann Brandt, Gloria Bigelow, Annie Briggs, Noelle Carbone, Wendy Jo Carlton, Crystal Chappell, Lisa Codileone, Christina Cox, Lagueria Davis, Stefani Deoul, Julia Eringer, Mona Elyafi, Erin Foley, Virginia Gardner, Isabella Gomez, Javier Grillo-Marxuach, Jess Harris-Distefano, Regina Y. Hicks, Kari Alison Hodge, Caryn K. Hayes, Dot Marie Jones, Emer Kinsella, Katrina Law, Gloria Calderon Kellett, Jessica Leccia, Caity Lotz, Jes Macallan, Laura Madalinski, Bridget McManus, Nami Melumad, Andrea Meyerson, Brent Miller, Natasha Negovanlis, Lyrica Okano, Nicole Pacent, Rachel Paulson, Dana Piccoli, Sheridan Pierce, Vanessa Piazza, Mishel Prada, Dominique Provost-Chalkley, Carolyn Ratteray, Diona Reasonover, Lily Richards, Mandahla Rose, Mike Royce, Sonia Sebastian, Hayland Stillwell, Clarissa Thibeaux, Chantal Thuy, Guinevere Turner, Briana Venskus, Liz Vassey, Nafessa Williams	

== Reception ==
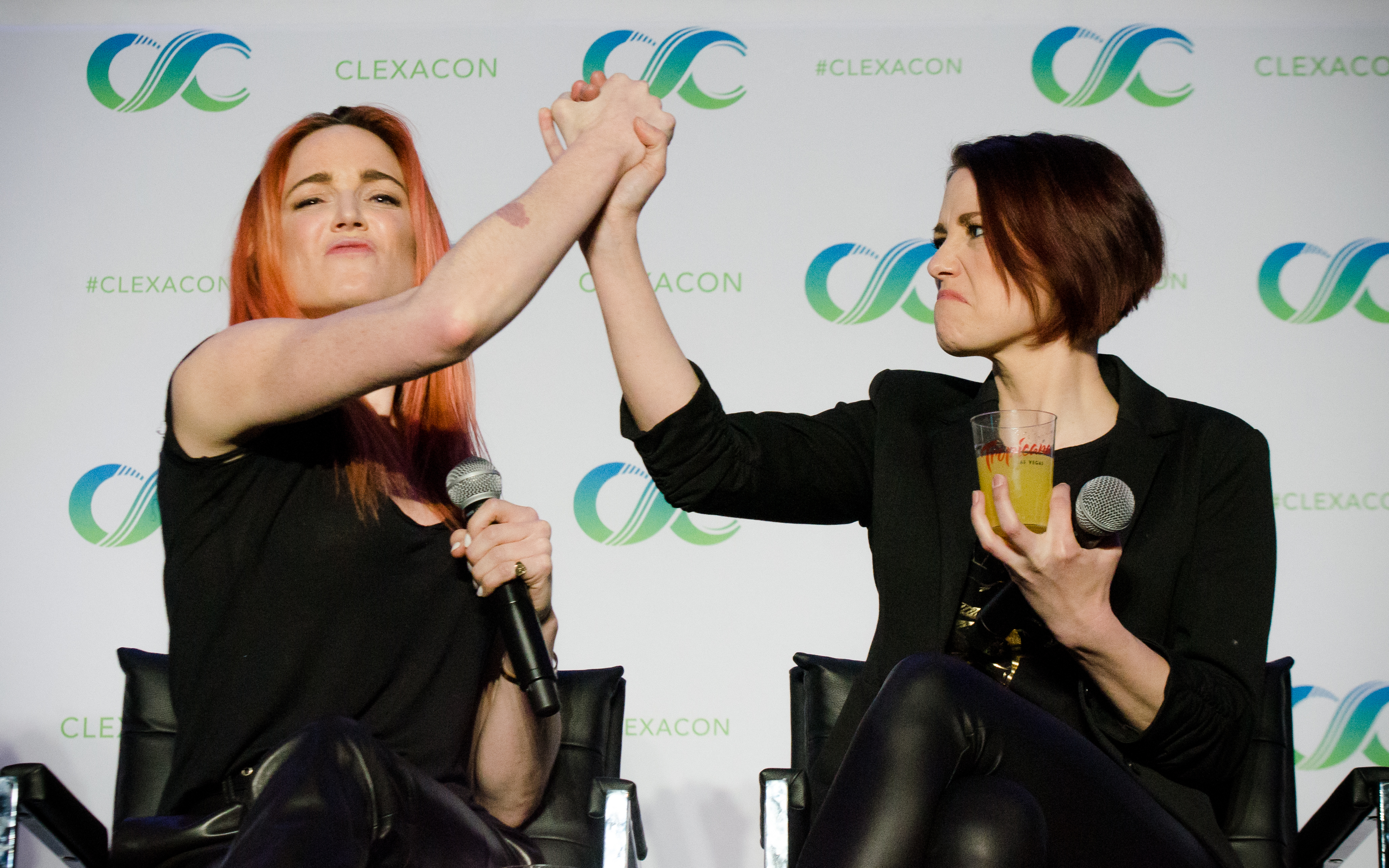
Actresses Caity Lotz and Chyler Leigh at ClexaCon 2018.

ClexaCon was met with a positive reception for its diversity in panels, its variety of guests, and its empowering workshops.

Convention organizers reported challenges in booking guests for ClexaCon's first year, as many talent agents feared the convention would either fail or be canceled. In an interview, organized recalled it taking between four and six months in order to secure certain guests, as the agents wanted to see if the convention was legitimate.

== See also ==
- GaymerX, an LGBTQ-focused video game convention
- Flame Con, an LGBTQ-focused comic convention
