= Nayo Wallace =

American actress

- Born: Detroit, Michigan, U.S.
- Occupation: Actress
- Years active: 1994–present
- Relatives: Vivian Dandridge (grandmother); Dorothy Dandridge (great-aunt)

Nayo Wallace is an American actress. She is best known for her roles on Speed Racer as Minx, scientist and girlfriend to Racer X and on the Hub Network's Care Bears: Welcome to Care-a-Lot as the voice of Harmony Bear from its premiere on June 2, 2012, until December 8, 2012. She also portrayed the character of Sarabi in The Lion King on Broadway.

== Personal life ==
Nayo Wallace was born in Detroit, Michigan. She is the granddaughter of Vivian Dandridge and the great-niece of Dorothy Dandridge. She graduated from Southfield High School.

== Filmography ==
=== Film ===
Film
Year	Film	Role	Notes
2001	The Brothers	Red the Stripper	
2008	Speed Racer	Minx	Credited as Nayo K. Wallace
2009	Reconciliation	Angela	
2011	The Notice	Ticket Buying Patron	Short
2011	Saints Row: The Third	Additional Voices	Video game
2012	Binary Domain	Rachael Townsend (English)	Video game
2012	Dark Tourist	Janita	
2012	Least Among Saints	Sandy Balek	
2013	Care Bears: Totally Sweet Adventures	Harmony Bear	
2014	A Life Taken	Gina Evans	
2014	Crazy Bitches	Dorri	
2017	Hater	Beverly	completed
2017	Stain	Jean	post-production

=== Television ===
Television
Year	Film	Role	Notes
2000	Passions	Flight Attendant	Two episodes: "Episode #1.332" and "Episode #1.329"
2004	The District	Young Colette Upshaw	One episode: "D.C. Confidential"
2006	Sleeper Cell	Sensor Operator	One episode: "Reunion"
2007	In Case of Emergency	Pink Thong Girl	One episode: "Your Goose Is Cooked" credited as Nayo K. Wallace
2009	Heroes	Med Tech	One episode: "Chapter Four: Cold Wars" credited as Nayo K. Wallace
2010	24	Female Reporter	One episode: "Day 8: 11:00 a.m.-12:00 p.m." credited as Nayo K. Wallace
2010	Two and a Half Men	Paulina	One episode: "Gumby with a Pokey"
2011	Blade	Tara Brooks (English)	Two episodes: "The Man, Blade" and "Childhood"
2011	Torchwood: Miracle Day	Wilson	One episode: "End of the Road"
2011	CSI: NY	Nora Boothe	One episode: "Crossroads"
2012	Southland	Lisa Hornby	One episode: "Identity"
2012	NCIS: Los Angeles	Political Analyst #1	One episode: "Dead Body Politic"
2012	Care Bears: Welcome to Care-a-Lot	Harmony Bear & Love-a-Lot Bear	26 episodes
2017	NCIS	Doctor	One episode: "M.I.A"
2018	Agents of S.H.I.E.L.D.	Estella	One episode: "The One Who Will Save Us All"
2019	The Rookie	Stacy	One episode: "Safety"
