= In Her Line of Fire =

- Theatrical release poster
- Directed by: Brian Trenchard-Smith
- Screenplay by: Sherry Admo; Paula Goldberg; Anna Lorenzo
- Produced by: Brian Trenchard-Smith
- Starring: Mariel Hemingway; David Keith; David Millbern; Jill Bennett
- Cinematography: Neil Cervin
- Edited by: Asim Nuraney
- Music by: David Reynolds
- Production companies: ApolloProMovie & Co. 1. Filmproduktion
- Distributed by: Regent Releasing; Here! Films
- Release date: April 21, 2006
- Running time: 90 minutes
- Country: United States
- Language: English
- Budget: $1.3 million
- Box office: $884,000

In Her Line of Fire (also known as Air Force Two) is a 2006 American action film directed by Brian Trenchard-Smith and starring Mariel Hemingway, David Keith, David Millbern and Jill Bennett.

In Her Line of Fire opened in limited release in the United States on April 21, 2006. The alternate version of the film distributed in other countries deleted all references to the homosexuality of the Lynn Delaney character. (Note: "...as the director, Brian Trenchard-Smith, has explained, there are two versions circulating, one being, if you will, a pink-reduced cut, which strips out all but the most subtle moments between the two women.")

== Plot ==
Air Force Two, carrying Vice President Walker and his staff, is flying over the South Pacific when it is suddenly damaged by an electrical storm. The plane is forced to ditch in the ocean off the coast of the (fictional) country of San Pietro, located near the Solomon Islands. As the few survivors make it onto the beach of a small off-shore island, one of them is shot dead by gunmen from a guerrilla camp. The remaining survivors, including the vice president, his Secret Service bodyguard Sergeant Major Lynn Delaney, and two members of the press corps, flee into the jungle and escape from the killers. It emerges that the shooters belong to a group of armed rebel forces intent on overthrowing San Pietro's dictatorial government. They are led by Armstrong, a ruthless American mercenary.

VP Walker, a former US Marine, and Delaney, an out lesbian ex-marine, served together in Kuwait during Desert Storm and fight off the rebels. One of the reporters is injured while running and tries to hide, but is caught and murdered by Armstrong. Walker is eventually caught, with orders from Armstrong to capture him alive because he plans to hold him for ransom. Before the catastrophe, Delaney and journalist Sharon Serrano had a tension-filled collaboration, and it now fell to them to infiltrate the rebel camp and save Walker. They are also captured after a gunfight. Armstrong orders that Delaney be put to death, but en route to the destination she is able to jump out of the jeep and escapes from her captors. She then sets out to rescue Walker and Sharon. Delaney sneaks into the guerrilla camp under cover of darkness and grabs weapons and explosives, placing landmine devices in strategic locations. The explosives create havoc in the camp, while she shoots and kills rebels from a distance.

Armstrong has arranged a buyer for VP Walker, flees the camp with him and Sharon, and heads to a boat anchored in the nearby river. Delaney, however, was lying in wait for Armstrong to arrive and when his henchman boards the boat the two engage in hand-to-hand combat. While heading towards the boat on a raft, Walker attacks Armstrong, they fall into the water, Sharon joins the fight, and Armstrong is drowned. Delaney kills the henchman with a speargun. Armstrong, though, had not drowned and as he rises from the water Delaney shoots him dead. Navy search and rescue helicopters spot the three, and Delaney and Sharon kiss passionately while Walker, who had earlier encouraged Delaney to "go for it" regarding Sharon, smiles.

In return for the VP's rescue and the cooperation of some of the rebel forces, the United States offers aid to San Pietro on condition that they agree to hold democratic elections.

== Cast ==
- Mariel Hemingway as Sergeant Major Lynn Delaney
- David Keith as Vice President Walker
- David Millbern as Armstrong
- Jill Bennett as Sharon Serrano

== Production ==
Filming took place over 12 days in various New Zealand locations, and 2 days in Vancouver, Canada.

Brian Trenchard-Smith had previously directed a gay-theme action film, Tides of War. He described In Her Line of Fire as:

A Lesbian Rambo movie ... a homage to 80's gun porn, starring Mariel Hemingway as the Vice President's sapphic secret service chief. This future Vice President, played by David Keith, in a utopian Washington where universal health care is passed by unanimous vote, actively encourages the seduction of one lesbian by another. "You're a marine. Go for it." ... The concept of a gay hero/heroine in the Harrison Ford role was the point.

In Her Line of Fire was produced for Here! Films as a feature-length movie for the Here TV premium network, and was marketed to a lesbian audience. The film poster included the tagline: "Behind enemy lines, No man can stop her. Only one woman can touch her."

== Critical reception ==
In his review for Variety, Dennis Harvey said the film was "passable action trash" and a "silly but serviceable" actioner, but described the performance by Mariel Hemingway as "a credible Sapphic Stallone".

== Box office ==
With a $1.3 million budget, it grossed $884K in its limited release.

== Home media ==
The film was released on DVD in Region 1 on January 16, 2007.
