= Jill Bennett (American actress) =

American actress

- Occupation(s): Actress, producer
- Known for: And Then Came Lola
- Website: www.jillbennett.com

Jill Bennett is an American actress. She is best known for her role in the 2009 lesbian film And Then Came Lola.

She co-starred on the television series Dante's Cove, as well as 3Way, a lesbian web series.

She has produced two different series, We Have to Stop Now which was shown at Frameline and Outfest LGBT film festivals, and Second Shot, which screened at The Dinah 2013, Outfest and won best feature at LFest in 2013.

The 2024 film Under the Influencer, which was shown at the Cannes Film Festival, was produced by Bennett.

== Personal life ==
Bennett is an out lesbian. She said "There are plenty of lesbians in Hollywood, but they're not out. And that's their choice, but I can't do that, it's too important to me".

== Filmography ==
Year	Title	Role	Notes
2003	Recipe for Disaster	Blind date girl	TV Movie
2003	Hideous Scream		Comedy short
2004	Tube	Heather	Comedy short
2004	Fish Out of Water	Betty	Comedy short
2005	The Pleasure Drivers	Marcy	
2005	The Benefits of Drinking Whiskey		Comedy short
2006	In Her Line of Fire	Sharon Serrano	
2006	Expiration Date	Alicia	
2006	Cause 4 Alarm	Gail	Comedy short
2007	Out at the Wedding	Wendy	
2007	X's & O's	Vivian	
2008	Shattered!	Mallory	
2009	And Then Came Lola	Casey	
2011	The Bounty	Maia Jacobs	Short Film

== Television ==
Year	Title	Role	Notes
2000	Beverly Hills, 90210	Darby Shahan	2 episodes: "I'm Using You 'Cause I Like You" & "Fertile Ground"
2000	The Others	Lara	2 episodes: "Luciferous" & "Theta"
2000	Zoe, Duncan, Jack & Jane	Penny	Episode: "Crossing the Line"
2007	Dante's Cove	Michelle	Regular role (season 3) (5 episodes)

== Other work ==
Year	Title	Role	Notes
2007–2008	We're Getting Nowhere	Herself	Video blog
2008	3Way	Andrea Bailey	Web series (12 episodes)
2009	The Gloves Are Off	Herself	Video blog
2009–2010	We Have to Stop Now	Kit	Web series (14 episodes)
2013	Second Shot	Kat McDonald	Web series (3 episodes)
