= Jennifer Corday =

American musician and singer-songwriter

Jennifer Corday is an American singer-songwriter known as Corday.

== Early life ==
Corday was born and raised in Long Beach, California. She graduated with honors from Wilson High School, where she enjoyed sports, music and drama and was the school mascot. After graduating, Corday started college at Long Beach City College, where she performed as a cellist in the chamber orchestra, and participated as an actress in several productions. She transferred to Chapman University in Orange, California, where she continued studying theater and music. She toured Alaska and Hawaii, performing as a cellist in the chamber and symphony orchestras and electric bassist in the jazz ensemble. She became interested in directing her senior year where she had the opportunity to produce and direct one-act plays for the public. She graduated with a B.A. in Communications, with minors in Music and English.

Corday later returned to Chapman University to study Education. She worked as a substitute teacher in the Orange Unified School District while she completed the program. After securing her Single Subject Clear Teaching Credential, Corday was hired to teach high school drama and English at Paramount High School, where she acted as Head of Department and the Cheerleading Advisor.

== Career ==
Around this time, Corday began performing as a singer-songwriter and guitarist on the coffee house circuit. She formed a duo with Renea McKee, which led to the all-female band Her Majesty. The group disbanded after releasing their first demo. Corday continued as a solo act, eventually forming another band, Corday and the Curious. She resigned from teaching, shortened the band name to Corday and founded Envy Records to produce and release her own records.

As of 2018, she has released six solo albums. Superhero was co-written, recorded, and produced in Corday's home studio. It is packaged in a double disc Digipack with a CD and DVD music video of the title track, and includes behind-the-scenes footage. Artwork on the album is by Jamie Kivisto. The Los Angeles Times described her first album Naked as lacking in musicianship, but said that Corday was a "wonderful storyteller". Her album Driven was described by Lesbian News as having a "scrumptious, textured variety of sounds" and compared her with Sheryl Crow.

Corday's earlier albums, Driven and Welcome to My Past, sold thousands of copies. Her song "Pie" was included on the MTV Undressed soundtrack and in numerous independent films. Corday wrote the soundtrack to Elena Undone.

Corday founded Venus Envy, an organization that donates profits from compilation CDs towards the fight against breast cancer, in memory of her mother Judy. The band Corday also performs at schools, presenting anti-drug and anti-tobacco concerts. In addition, she has toured overseas to perform for the troops.

She is openly gay with a large following in the community. In 1997, she was featured on the cover of Curve. Corday also blogs for SheWired.

== Discography ==
=== Albums ===
- Naked (1997) - Corday and the Curious
- Welcome to My Past (2000)
- Driven (2001)
- Kick Ash (2003)
- Superhero (2007)
- Weekend Warrior (2012)
- Tastiest Licks: Greatest Hits (2015)
- You Can't Change My DNA (2018)

=== Singles and EPs ===
- "Spiderwebs" (1998) - Corday and the Curious
- "Redneck Lesbo" (2006)
- "Riding A Rainbow" (2014)
- "Lock On My Heart" (2017)
- "Heartbeat" (2017)

=== Soundtracks ===
- Laughing Matters... More! (2006)
- Poppy's Foursome (2007)
- Elena Undone (2010)

== Band members ==
- Benj Clarke - bass
- Damien Smith - lead guitar
- Don E. Sachs - lead guitar
- Jorgen Ingmar - drums, percussion
- Krysta Carson - backing vocals

== Previous members ==
- Jon Grillo - bass
- Mike Quinn Buckels - bass
- Bart Davis - lead guitar
- Jorgen Ingmar - drums
- Don E Sachs - guitar
- Benj Clarke - bass
- Darren Bergdorf - drums
- Damien Smith - lead guitar
- Erik MacPherson - bass
- Brett Shuemaker - drums, backing vocals
- Joey Ancona - bass
- Rick Weller - lead guitar
- Kyle Zeiler - drums, backing vocals
- Robby Trujillo - bass, backing vocals
- Timothy John Ramirez - lead guitar

== Awards ==
- Winner: Best Live Band, Best Alternative Band, Best Female Performer at Orange County Music Awards
- Winner: KIIS FM Battle of the Bands
- Winner: Best Female Acoustic Act at Orange County Music Awards
- Nominated: Best Pop Rock Band - Southern California Music Awards
- Nominated: Best Pop Rock Band - 2004 Orange County Music Awards
- Nominated: Best Song - DIY Awards, Los Angeles, for "I Rule The World"
- Nominated: 2004 PRISM Awards, for "Inhale"
- Nominated: Best Orange County Act and Best Video - LA Music Awards
- Nominated: Video Of The Year - GLAMA Awards, for "Pie"
