= Sarah Warn =

American writer

- Born: United States
- Occupations: Writer, editor
- Writing career
- Genres: Entertainment, non-fiction
- Literary movement: LGBT, online

Sarah Warn is an American writer and the former editor of entertainment website AfterEllen.com.

== Biography ==
Warn graduated from Annie Wright Schools in Tacoma in 1992. She then attended Wellesley College in 1996 with a degree in women's studies, and received a master's degree in theological studies from Harvard University in 1998. She spent eight years in online marketing before selling her gay and lesbian entertainment websites AfterEllen.com and AfterElton.com to Logo in 2006. Warn stepped down as the Editor in Chief of AfterEllen.com, with Karman Kregloe stepping into the role in 2009. Warn is currently the Vice President of Growth at Seattle-based immigration startup Boundless Immigration.

Warn's extensive written work on lesbian and bisexual women in entertainment has been included or cited in numerous magazines, including Velvetpark, Curve and Lesbian News; in newspapers like USA Today, Los Angeles Times, and Emmy Magazine; and in books like BITCHfest: Ten Years of Cultural Criticism from the Pages of Bitch Magazine, Queer Popular Culture: Literature, Media, Film, and Television, Bisexual Women: Friendship & Social Organization, and News and Sexuality: Media Portraits of Diversity. Warn also wrote the introduction to the Reading the 'L' Word, a collection of essays by academics and journalists about the Showtime drama The L Word.

In November 2006, Warn was honored as one of the year's "10 Amazing Gay Women in Showbiz" by non-profit organization Power Up. In December 2006, she appeared on a panel with other notable LGBT actors and activists on Logo's Queer Year 2006 TV special. She was one of four co-hosts on the first season of the online lesbian talk show She Said What?

Warn currently co-hosts the entertainment news video blogs She Made Me Watch This and Who Thought THAT Was A Good Idea? with her partner Lori Grant, which runs weekly on AfterEllen.com.
