= AfterEllen =

Feminist news site

- Screenshot Screenshot of AfterEllen main page.
- Website type: Website, blog, news (entertainment, community, society), podcast
- Available in: English
- Owners: Lesbian Nation, LLC
- Creator: Sarah Warn
- Editors: Jocelyn Macdonald, Editor in Chief
- Website: afterellen.com
- Commercial: Yes
- Registration: Optional
- Launched: April 15, 2002; 24 years ago
- Current status: Online

AfterEllen is an American culture website founded in 2002, with a focus on entertainment, interviews, reviews, and news of interest to the lesbian and bisexual women's community. The site covers pop culture and lifestyle issues from a feminist perspective; and the political climate as it pertains to the community. AfterEllen is not affiliated with entertainer Ellen DeGeneres, although its name refers to her coming out, specifically when her character came out in "The Puppy Episode" (1997) on her eponymous sitcom.

AfterEllen originally reported on subjects of popular culture, such as celebrities, fashion, film, television, music, and books; publishing articles, regular columns, opinion pieces, interviews, reviews, recaps of television shows with lesbian and bisexual characters or subtextual content, and popularity contests. Weekly vlogs were a key feature, the more popular of which included "Brunch With Bridget", "Lesbian Love", and "Is This Awesome?" The site also featured popular web series such as the Streamy Award-winning and Webby Award-nominated Anyone But Me. AfterEllen later included news and politics affecting lesbians, bi women, and the general community. Its podcast, Let's Process, ran from 2014 to 2016, and was revived in 2020 as the AfterEllen Podcast. Ownership of the website changed hands in 2006 (Logo), 2014 (Evolve Media), and 2019 (Lesbian Nation).

== History ==
=== 2002–2005 (Erosion Media) ===
AfterEllen was founded April 15, 2002 by Sarah Warn and Lori Grant, under their corporation Erosion Media. A companion site focusing on the portrayal of gay and bisexual men in the media, AfterElton.com, was founded in January 2005. Its name was an homage to Elton John. The site rebranded as TheBacklot.com in April 2013, and was dissolved in June 2015.

=== 2006–2013 (Logo) ===
In 2006, AfterEllen and AfterElton were acquired by cable television channel Logo. (Note: AfterElton, AfterEllen's companion site for gay and bisexual men, was launched in January 2005 (later renamed TheBacklot.com).) In 2007, in response to the popular "Maxim Hot 100" readers contest for heterosexual men, the annual "AfterEllen Hot 100 List" poll of women in "film, television, music, sports and fashion" was created. The special feature ran until 2016.

In March 2008, AfterEllen was named one of "the world's 50 most powerful blogs" by British newspaper The Guardian for its "irreverent look at how the lesbian community is represented in the media. At the time considered the top website for lesbian women, that same year it averaged "over 700,000 readers" per month.

In October 2009, Sarah Warn announced that associate editor Karman Kregloe would take over as Editor in Chief. In June 2011, the site ranked as the second most popular LGBT website with 203,924 monthly visitors, after The Advocate.

=== 2014–2018 (Evolve Media) ===
In October 2014, Evolve Media acquired AfterEllen from Viacom Media Networks, the parent company of Logo, and made it a part of its TotallyHer Media subsidiary. Kregloe announced that managing editor Trish Bendix would be assuming the role of Editor in Chief. In November 2014, TotallyHer Media announced the launch of The Lphabet, an original AfterEllen online comedy series that would "demystify terms from the lesbian and bi community". According to Karman Kregloe, in 2015 AfterEllen "averaged 1.25 million readers" per month.

In September 2016, Trish Bendix announced her departure on her personal Tumblr blog and stated that AfterEllen was shutting down, with only its archive to be kept live. TotallyHer Media denied the allegation by Bendix, calling it a "false rumor", and on September 20, 2016, Evolve Media fired Bendix ahead of her scheduled departure. Bendix told The Advocate, "I share the feelings of the community at large that contributing to a site that is run by a cisgender, heterosexual male is not what we are looking for in a virtual home". Emrah Kovacoglu, General Manager of TotallyHer Media, explained that a drawback was triggered by the lack of "increased audience" and "enough advertiser support to justify continuing to invest at the same levels".

Memoree Joelle became Editor in Chief of AfterEllen in December 2016. Joelle promised readers that there would be a return to the website's original intention of maintaining a "feminist perspective" and staying "true to a lesbian/bi perspective", as well as "more racial diversity and age diversity". Soon afterwards, Joelle issued a statement in which she questioned the motives behind the increase in "attack" language directed at lesbians from members of the LGBT community, and the decline in interest within it "to hear the variety of perspectives in our community". Under her editorial direction, articles and essays of political nature became more frequent.

In December 2016, Joelle added her personal signature and endorsement statement to the "L is out of GBT" petition on Change.org:

I'm signing because I see the word lesbian becoming a bad word under lgbt, in a time when it's trendy to be pansexual or fluid, etc which are all newly invented terms. I don't agree with the word queer being applied to me under this acronym as it isn't accurate, and I don't agree with all of the gender politics the lgbt acronym focuses on. Further, I don't appreciate being lumped into an acronym where the only thing we have in common is being minorities, as it is more apparent that it erases lesbian identity rather than supporting/including it.

Former AfterEllen senior editor Heather Hogan criticized Joelle on Twitter for doing so, accusing Joelle of promoting a "lesbophobia" movement on AfterEllen which, according to Hogan, was a disguise for "anti-trans, anti-bi" rhetoric. Joelle denied Hogan's accusations and described her reasoning as "a FORM of activism".

In 2018 — after banning use of the controversial term "TERF" on its website and social media channels, publishing articles such as "Girl Dick, the Cotton Ceiling and the Cultural War on Lesbians, Girls and Women" by Miranda Yardley, and the op-ed "How I became the most hated lesbian in Baltimore" by Julia Beck, as well as for giving publicity to vloggers who criticized trans women activism in the lesbian community — AfterEllen (although not specifically mentioned) was by implication accused of transphobia in a general declaration titled "Not in our name" signed by representatives of nine lesbian and queer publications in which "trans misogynistic content" in "so-called lesbian publications" was condemned, including "male-owned media companies" that profited "from the traffic generated by [such] controversies". The trans-related controversy received coverage on NBC Out, the LGBTQ section of mainstream media NBC News. In response to NBC Out's news story, Joelle and AfterEllen colleagues described the "Not in our name" statement as "a continuation of a false narrative that's been created to perpetuate division and anxiety within the lesbian community", and denounced the backlash launched against AfterEllen for addressing issues such as "lesbians [being] called 'vagina fetishists' with 'genital preferences'"; (Note: Re "Vagina fetishists": Ditum, Sarah (11 July 2018). "Why were lesbians protesting at Pride? Because the LGBT coalition leaves women behind". New Statesman.; Heuchan, Claire (July 1, 2017). "The Vanishing Point: A Reflection Upon Lesbian Erasure". Sister Outrider.; Re "Genital preferences": Dash, Stacey (April 25, 2017). "New Thing To Be Wrong About: Having 'Genital Preferences' In Dating Is Transphobic". Patheos.; Last, Jonathan V. (February 6, 2018). "Ryan Anderson: Having Genital Preferences Is Now 'Transphobic'". The Weekly Standard. Archived from the original on July 28, 2018.) repudiating the "idea that lesbians are not allowed to have an opinion, or feel anything for that matter. That we can't have any autonomy. That we must bow to groupthink at every turn or be subjected to homophobic slurs, attacks on our jobs, doxing." It was also revealed that AfterEllen "was invited...to sign the statement as well, the day after it was released."

=== 2019–present (Lesbian Nation) ===
In March 2019, AfterEllen was bought by Lesbian Nation, a multimedia company owned by Memoree Joelle and business partner Gaye Chapman. With this change in ownership, articles and opinion pieces concerning controversies affecting lesbians and bisexual women increased, and by this point in its tenure the site had become primarily associated in queer spaces with "Terfism".

"AfterEllen does not use the word queer to describe lesbians" was announced in an editorial addendum to a March 2020 article. In September 2020, the site declared their stance on terms used for referring to females: "We will NEVER use the words 'womxn' or 'cis' or any other derogatory, insulting, abusive terms directed at females. Women are women."

In June 2020, Joelle announced the promotion of Jocelyn Macdonald, managing editor of AfterEllen, to Editor in Chief.

In November 2020, the website experienced technical difficulties and was inaccessible for a week, prompting Out to publish a hostile article speculating about AfterEllen's demise. Gaye Chapman, co-founder and chief executive officer of Lesbian Nation LLC, issued a rebuke through her Twitter account and announced that the site would "be back soon".

On February 18, 2021, AfterEllen announced that the business partnership between Gaye Chapman and Memoree Joelle had been dissolved, with Chapman retaining sole ownership of Lesbian Nation LLC and AfterEllen.

In April 2023, Gaye Chapman made it known that "almost 60,000 articles" were restored from the web server crash that occurred in November 2020. Chapman also announced that effective June 30, 2023, "new, paid content" was being suspended as a cost-cutting measure necessitated by the site's current financial situation. Chapman stated unequivocally that AfterEllen was not for sale, and she intended to "find new ways to put content up on the site" and compensate writers.

== Podcast ==
AfterEllen's official podcast, Let's Process, premiered on November 18, 2014, and continued until January 13, 2016. The podcast was relaunched under a new name, AfterEllen Podcast, on April 29, 2020.

== See also ==
- Autostraddle
- GO
- The Ladder
- Lesbian Connection
- Lesbian Tide
- Sinister Wisdom
- Velvetpark
- Vice Versa
- Feminist views on transgender topics
- Lesbian erasure
- Trans-exclusionary radical feminist
