= Yvonne Welbon =

American film director

- Born: April 21, 1967 (age 59); Chicago, Illinois, U.S.
- Occupation: Filmmaker

Yvonne Welbon (born April 21, 1967) is an American independent film director, producer, and screenwriter based in Chicago. She is known for her films, Living with Pride:Ruth C. Ellis @ 100 (1999), Sisters in Cinema (2003), and Monique (1992).

== Work ==
Welbon attended the School of the Art Institute of Chicago for the MFA program in film and video and Northwestern University for a Ph.D, in Radio, TV, and Film.

Welbon has directed nine films and produced fifteen others. Her work has been screened on PBS, Starz/Encore, TV-ONE, IFC, Bravo, BET, the Sundance Channel and in the Toronto International Film Festival, the Sundance Film Festival, the Berlin Film Festival, and over one hundred other film festivals around the world. Living with Pride:Ruth C. Ellis @ 100 won ten best documentary awards, including the GLAAD Media Award for Outstanding Documentary. Her ongoing Sundance Documentary Fellowship project is Sisters in Cinema, a documentary, website, and forthcoming book based on her doctoral dissertation about the history of African American women feature film directors and the personal struggles they face within the industry based on their identities.

She is also working on a web based online community project, Sisters in the Life: 25 Years of Out African American Lesbian Media-making (1986-2011), which includes a collection of essays, a documentary, an archive, and a mobile app.

Welbon's producer credits include: John Pierson's Split Screen, Zeinabu Irene Davis' Mother of the River and her Sundance dramatic competition feature Compensation, Cheryl Dunye's HBO film Stranger Inside, Thomas Allen Harris' Berlin International Film Festival award-winning documentary É Minha Cara (That's My Face), Liz Miller's The Water Front, Alex Juhasz's Scale, Andrew Nisker's GERBAGE! The Revolution Starts at Home, and Catherine Crouch's One Small Step and Stray Dogs.

== Biography ==
Having grown up as the daughter of a Chicago police officer, Welbon received an undergraduate degree in history from Vassar College. Thereafter, she spent six years in Taipei, Taiwan, where she taught English, learned Mandarin Chinese at the age of 23, and founded and published an alternative arts magazine. She ran the magazine for a total of five years.

After her return to the United States, Welbon completed a Masters of Fine Arts degree with the School of the Art Institute of Chicago and later received her PhD from Northwestern University in 2001. She also graduated from the American Film Institute's, Directing Workshop for Women.

Welbon is associate professor and department chair of the Department of Journalism and Media Studies at Bennett College for Women, an HBCU in Greensboro, North Carolina. Welbon has also been a visiting scholar at Duke University (2013-2014), and is working on a project to curate her "Sisters in Cinema" archive to allow it to become a resource for academic use.

Currently Welbon is the Interim Creative Director of Chicken and Egg Pictures and has produced a documentary, The New Black, by Yoruba Richen. She also has begun a web based community called Sisters in the Life: 25 Years of Out African American Lesbian Media-making (1986-2011).

== Filmography ==
=== Director ===
- Monique (film) (1992)
- The Cinematic Jazz of Julie Dash (1992)
- Sisters in the Life: First Love (1993)
- Missing Relations (1994)
- Remembering Wei-Yi Fang, Remembering Myself (1996)
- Split Screen (TV series, 1997)
- Living with Pride: Ruth C. Ellis @ 100 (1999)
- The Taste of Dirt (2003)
- Sisters in Cinema (2003)

=== Producer ===
- Monique (1992)
- Mother of the River (short, associate producer, 1995)
- Remembering Wei-Yi Fang, Remembering Myself (1996)
- Compensation (associate producer, 1999)
- One Small Step (1999)
- Living with Pride: Ruth C. Ellis @ 100 (1999)
- Stranger Inside (TV Movie, associate producer, 2001)
- That's My Face (co-producer, 2001)
- Stray Dogs (2002)
- Sisters in Cinema (2003)
- The Water Front (2007)
- Scale: Measuring Might in the Media Age (2007)
- Garbage! The Revolution Starts at Home (2007)
- The New Black (2013)

== See also ==
- List of female film and television directors
- List of lesbian filmmakers
- List of LGBT-related films directed by women
