= Cheryl Dunye =

Liberian-American actress and director

- Dunye at the Teddy Award 2026
- Born: May 13, 1966 (age 60); Monrovia, Liberia
- Education: Temple University (BA); Rutgers University (MFA)
- Occupations: Filmmaker; actress
- Years active: 1990–present
- Children: 2
- Awards: 1995: Media Production Award; National Endowment for the Arts etc
- Website: jingletownfilms.com

Cheryl Dunye (/duːnˈjeɪ/; born May 13, 1966) is a Liberian-American film director, producer, screenwriter, editor and actress. She is the daughter of Edith Irene Hamilton Dunye and George Kekura Dunye. She was born in Liberia, but shortly after, her family moved to Philadelphia. Dunye's work often concerns themes of race, sexuality, and gender, particularly issues relating to black lesbians. She is known as the first out black lesbian to ever direct a feature film with her 1996 film The Watermelon Woman. She runs the production company Jingletown Films based in Oakland, California.

== Early life ==
Dunye was born in Monrovia, Liberia and grew up in Philadelphia, Pennsylvania. She first attended Michigan State University, where she was in the political theory program due to her desire to make a change and have an impact on the world.

When she realized she could use media as a tool in her political activism, she ended up in the filmmaking program at Temple University in Philadelphia. She received her BA from Temple and her MFA from Rutgers University's Mason Gross School of Art. While at Temple University, Dunye made her first ever video project for her senior thesis which was a montage of images of things like newspapers that she had recorded and played over a reading of a poem by Sapphire called "Wild Thing."

== Career ==
Dunye began her filmmaking career in the early 1990s with a series of short films that blended documentary and narrative techniques, which she termed “Dunyementaries.” These works, produced between 1990 and 1994, explored themes of race, sexuality, and identity from the perspective of a Black lesbian filmmaker.

Her feature film debut, The Watermelon Woman (1996), brought her widespread recognition and is considered a landmark in independent cinema. The film, which Dunye wrote, directed, and starred in, addresses the absence of Black lesbian representation in film history and has been widely discussed in film scholarship.

In 2001, Dunye directed the HBO film Stranger Inside, a drama centered on the lives of incarcerated African American women. The production incorporated elements of realism, including casting formerly incarcerated individuals.

Dunye later directed the studio comedy My Baby's Daddy (2004), marking a shift into mainstream filmmaking, while continuing to work in independent cinema with projects such as The Owls (2010), which premiered at the Berlin International Film Festival.

Her subsequent work includes Mommy Is Coming (2012) and the short film Black Is Blue (2014), both of which continued her exploration of sexuality, identity, and marginalized communities.

In addition to filmmaking, Dunye has had a significant academic career, teaching at institutions including the University of California, Los Angeles, the California Institute of the Arts, and San Francisco State University.

In 2016, Dunye was awarded a Guggenheim Fellowship in the field of filmmaking, selected from nearly 3,000 applicants. That same year, she was invited to join the Academy of Motion Picture Arts and Sciences (AMPAS).

Dunye has also directed for television, contributing to series such as Queen Sugar and Dear White People, further expanding her work into episodic storytelling.

=== Academics ===
She has taught at the UCLA, UC Santa Cruz, Pitzer College, Claremont Graduate University, Pomona College, California Institute of the Arts, The New School of Social Research, the School of the Art Institute of Chicago and San Francisco State University.

=== The Early Works of Cheryl Dunye ===
Dunye began her career with six short films which have been collected on DVD as The Early Works of Cheryl Dunye. Most of these videos feature the use of mixed media, a blurring of fact and fiction and explored issues relating to the director's experience as a black lesbian filmmaker. These films are early examples of "Dunyementaries," a self-coined blend of narrative and documentary techniques that Dunye describes as "a mix of film, video, friends, and a lot of heart." These works, spanning from 1990 to 1994, explore themes of race, sexuality, family, relationships, whiteness, and the intricacies of white and black lesbian dating culture. Dunye's early works were produced with a low budget and often starred Dunye herself as lead actress.

==== Janine (1990) ====
Before Cheryl Dunye became a household name, she first blurred the lines between fact and fiction with the short film "Janine"(experimental documentary, 1990), the story of a black lesbian's relationship with a white, upper middle class high school girl." This experimental documentary follows Dunye's narration of her friendship with a high school classmate, Janine Sorelli. Dunye describes her crush on Janine that spanned from 9th to 12th grade. Dunye explains that Janine's wealthy middle class lifestyle made Dunye feel out of place and uncomfortable with her own identity. Their relationship ended after their senior year of high school when, after Dunye came out to Janine as gay, Janine's mother offered to pay for a doctor to "talk to somebody about [her] problems."

Dunye describes her experience working on Janine as an external expression of her personal struggles. Dunye says, "The issues I raise in Janine aren't easy ones, and I struggle with them daily. Rather than internalizing them, I put them in my videos." As Dunye says when discussing Janine, she finds it important to represent herself in her work "physically and autobiographically," and states that her work has two goals: to educate audiences unfamiliar with black lesbians and their communities and to empower and entertain other black lesbians through representation in her films.

==== She Don't Fade (1991) ====
(Experimental narrative, 1991) "A self-reflexive look at the sexuality of a young black lesbian." This film follows the sexual pursuits of Shae Clarke, an African American lesbian. Clarke, played by Dunye, defines and readily demonstrates her "new approach to women." The Criterion Channel describes it as "A smart, hilarious, and self-reflexive look at the sexuality of a young black lesbian." Electronic Arts Intermix says "Dunye cleverly combines humour and storytelling to relay a tale of adventure and conquest within the realm of sexuality.

==== Vanilla Sex (1992) ====
(Experimental documentary, 1992) "This four-minute experimental documentary features Dunye's voice in conversation with an offscreen character, played over photography and found footage. Dunye's narration describes the different meanings of the term vanilla sex which, to white lesbians, meant sex without toys while, to black lesbians, meant sex with white women. Dunye uses the opportunity to explore and discuss the different meanings of such a term in two different contexts between the white and black lesbian communities."

==== An Untitled Portrait (1993) ====
(Video montage, 1993) "Dunye's relationship with her brother is examined in this mixture of appropriated film footage, super 8mm home movies & Dunye's special brand of humor."

==== The Potluck and the Passion (1993) ====
(Experimental narrative, 1993) The Potluck and the Passion "paints a picture of a couple's one year anniversary, where they host a potluck, each inviting their own friends to enhance the evening." "Sparks fly as racial, sexual and social politics intermingle at a lesbian potluck."

==== Greetings from Africa (1994) ====
(Narrative, 1994) "Cheryl, playing herself, humorously experiences the mysteries of lesbian dating in the 90s." Greetings from Africa (1994) is a narrative short film featuring Dunye as Cheryl, a young adult black lesbian working to navigate the complicated world of lesbian dating in the 90s. The film opens with Cheryl narrating in front of a camera about her efforts to get back into the dating scene while attempting to avoid the common pitfall of lesbian serial monogamy. After this opening, Cheryl meets L, a white woman, at a party. L and Cheryl hit it off, and soon meet for a date. Before their date, Cheryl and a friend discuss L, mentioning that Cheryl's friend knew someone had recently seen L at the African American studies department office at a nearby school. Later, after Cheryl has not heard from L for a few days, she attends a party hoping to see L there. Cheryl strikes up a conversation with another black queer woman at the party. Cheryl is surprised to find the woman is not L's old roommate, as L had told Cheryl, but rather her girlfriend. The film concludes with Cheryl reading a greeting card from L with the tagline, "Greetings from Africa." The postcard reads that L has joined the Peace Corps and was currently living and working on the Ivory Coast in Africa. This film explores themes of black fetishization as L is depicted to have had multiple relationships with black women, also implied by her presence at the African American Studies Department and her final postcard labelled, "Greetings from Africa."

=== The Watermelon Woman (1996) ===
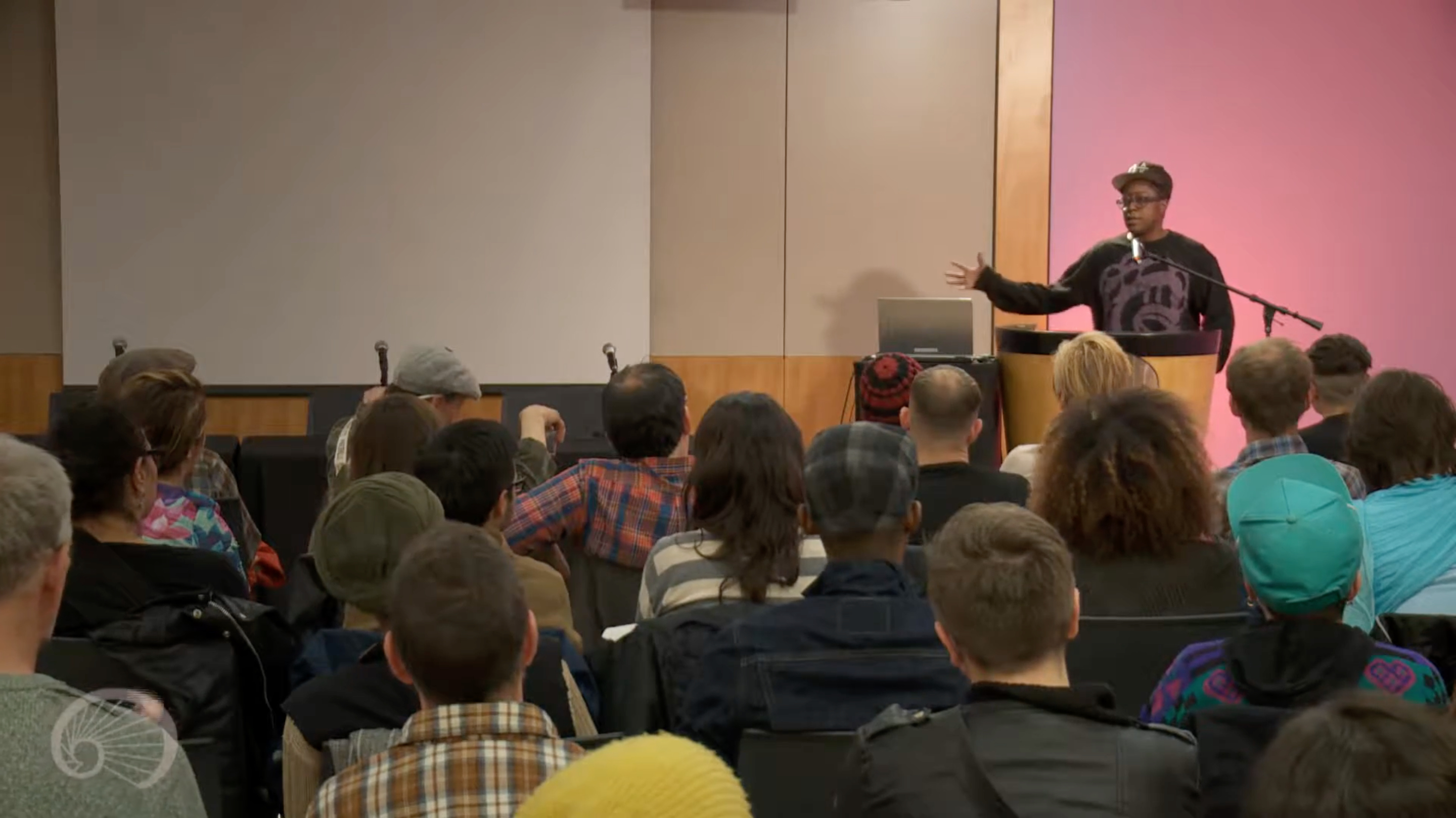
Dunye presenting The Watermelon Woman at Radar Reading Series at the San Francisco Public Library (2016)

Her feature film debut was The Watermelon Woman (1996), an exploration of the history of black women and lesbians in film. "[It] has earned a place in cinematic history as the first feature-length narrative film written and directed by out black lesbian about black lesbians." In 1993 Dunye was doing research for a class on black film history, by looking for information on black actresses in early films. Many times the credits for these women were left out of the film. Frustrated by a lack in the archives, Dunye created a fictional character, Fae Richards, and constructed an archive for that character. Thus, Dunye utilized fiction and the arts to address gaps she noted in official records. She decided that she was going to use her work to create a story for black women in early films. The film's title is a play on the Melvin Van Peebles's film The Watermelon Man (1970). Dunye then used the creative archival material to curate events to raise funds and show progress to donors.

In the film, the protagonist Cheryl, played by the director, is an aspiring black lesbian filmmaker attempting to bring about the history of black lesbians in cinematic history while attempting to produce her own work because "our stories have never been told." Cheryl the protagonist becomes fascinated by an actress she finds in a movie called Plantation Memories and decides she wants to learn everything there is to know about the actress listed only as "Watermelon Woman" in the credits of the film. The story explores the difficulty in navigating archival sources that either excludes or ignores black queer women working in Hollywood, particularly that of actress Fae Richards whose character bore the name that provides the title for the film. In conducting research for the film, Dunye utilized the Library of Congress and materials on Ira Jeffries in the Lesbian Herstory Archives, which was parodied as the Center for Lesbian Information and Technology (C.L.I.T.) in the film. Dunye and photographer Zoe Leonard collaborated to stage and construct The Fae Richards Photo Archive, 1993-1996 to be used in the film. The series was used to fundraise for the film's production through a sale at A.I.R. Gallery, and appeared in the 1997 Whitney Biennial. In 2016, the film was restored and rereleased widely for its 20th anniversary and resides in the permanent cinema collection at the Museum of Modern Art in New York City.

In 2021, The Watermelon Woman was selected for preservation in the United States National Film Registry by the Library of Congress as being "culturally, historically, or aesthetically significant." In July 2023, The Watermelon Woman was released by the Criterion Collection in a 2K digital restoration supervised by Dunye, making it one of the few films by a Black lesbian filmmaker to enter the collection.

==== Production ====
Dunye conceived of the film while conducting research for a class on black film history. Frustrated by the lack of archival material about Black actresses in early Hollywood, she created a fictional character, Fae Richards, and constructed an archive for that character. Dunye used fiction and the arts to address these gaps and tell the untold stories of Black women in film.

The film was produced on a modest budget of approximately $300,000, with funding from sources including the National Endowment for the Arts and private donors.B. Ruby Rich (2013). New Queer Cinema: The Director's Cut. Duke University Press. p. 249. ISBN 9780822354284. To help finance production, Dunye and photographer Zoe Leonard collaborated to create The Fae Richards Photo Archive, 1993-1996, which was used to stage fundraising events, including a sale at A.I.R. Gallery. The film was shot in Philadelphia and features a mix of documentary-style interviews and fictional storytelling.

==== Plot and themes ====
In the film, the protagonist Cheryl, played by Dunye, is an aspiring black lesbian filmmaker attempting to uncover the history of black lesbians in Hollywood. She becomes fascinated by an actress she finds in a 1930s film titled Plantation Memories, who is only credited as "Watermelon Woman" or as a "mammy." Cheryl embarks on a journey to uncover the actress's true identity, revealing the erasure of Black queer women from cinematic history. The film explores archival exclusion, Black lesbian identity, and the intersection of race, gender, and sexuality in film. While searching for the "Watermelon Woman," "She encounters her first archival limit, which scholars Sue McKemmish, Michael Piggott, Barbara Reed, Frank Upward, Jocelyn Fenton Stitt, and Sarah Tyson define as barriers created when documents pass into the hands of archival institutions from those who created them, inhibiting attempts to use records to tell family stories and circumscribing efforts to reclaim records about enslaved people.The film explores archival exclusion, Black lesbian identity, and the intersection of race, gender, and sexuality in film."

==== Reception and legacy ====
Upon its release, The Watermelon Woman received critical acclaim for its innovative storytelling and exploration of underrepresented identities. The film premiered at the Berlin International Film Festival and won the Teddy Award for Best Feature Film.

The film was praised for blending documentary and fiction to address historical erasure. Critics noted its self-reflexive approach to film history, with The New York Times calling it "a groundbreaking work of independent queer cinema." However, it also faced controversy; in 1996, the film was targeted by conservative politicians in the U.S. after it was revealed that the National Endowment for the Arts had partially funded its production.

==== Restoration and re-release ====
In 2016, to commemorate its 20th anniversary, The Watermelon Woman was restored in 2K resolution by the Outfest UCLA Legacy Project, with funding from the Andy Warhol Foundation and the Film Foundation. The restoration was screened at international film festivals and added to the permanent cinema collection at the Museum of Modern Art in New York City."Cheryl Dunye". Jingletown Films. The film continues to be widely taught in courses on film studies, gender studies, and African American studies, reinforcing its legacy as a landmark in queer and Black cinema.

=== Stranger Inside (2001) ===
Dunye's second feature, and first project after The Watermelon Woman, is the HBO-produced television movie Stranger Inside, based on the experiences of African-American lesbians in prison. The film had a budget of $2 million and was released in theaters as well as on their network.

The film deals with a young woman and juvenile offender named Treasure (Yolonda Ross), who seeks to build a relationship with her estranged mother by getting transferred to the same prison facility once she becomes an adult. In an interview with Peyton Robinson for Cinema Femme: The Magazine, Dunye revealed that the film used “real inmates and incarcerated folks to play themselves,” a choice inspired by her love of documentary and archive, calling it “[her] version of it”.

Dunye became interested in exploring motherhood within imprisonment in Stranger Inside by the birth of her daughter and Harriet Jacobs's Incidents in the Life of a Slave Girl. Additionally, Dunye was interested in the topic of incarcerated women through Angela Davis's work and the Critical Resistance's Creating Change conference at University of California, Berkeley. In a 2004 issue of Feminist Studies, Dunye discussed some of her inspiration and purpose for the film, particularly how these women make prison a home. "In approaching this piece," Dunye says, "I was interested in how connected a lot of these women are to the outside world and how they find that balance to being an inmate, being a mother, being a member of a family or a clan, or a group that got them in--one that they support or have to support. It puts these women in many different spaces at the same time. But one space that they have to call home is this institution: the prison." Dunye did extensive research into women's prisons and extended this research process to the cast and crew during preproduction, like visiting actual women's prisons.

Dunye conducted a screenwriting workshop modeled after Rhodessa Jones's Medea Project: Theater for Incarcerated Women during her research. The workshop consisted of Dunye working with 12 incarcerated women from the Shakopee Correctional Facility in Minnesota; this partnership was commissioned through the Walker Art Center during Dunye's time as the center's Artist in Residence. Catherine Opie took mug shots of the people involved in the film's production, though few of the photographs were actually featured in the final cut due to pressure from HBO. Dunye looked to understand the interpersonal relationships in prison and their use as a means of survival. The collaborative project of the script was then performed in live readings by the twelve workshop participants and presented at the prison. By the time of the release of the film, seven of these women were released and were able to attend a screening at the Walker Center. Those that had not yet completed their sentences were able to view the film at the Shakopee Women's Facility as the film was screened there as well. A live reading performed by professional actors was recorded by the Walker Centre and was showcased at festivals and contributed to the successful funding and production of the film.

Stranger Inside premiered at the Sundance Film Festival on January 24, 2001. Upon release, it won Audience Awards at the Seattle Lesbian & Gay Film Festival, the San Francisco International Film Festival, L.A. Outfest, and the Philadelphia Film Festival, as well as the Special Jury Award at the Miami Gay and Lesbian Film Festival. In 2002, the film received three Independent Spirit Award nominations including Best Director for Dunye, and five Black Reel Award nominations. Producer Effie T. Brown won the Independent Spirit Award for Producers Award.

=== Black Is Blue (2014) ===
Dunye's short film Black Is Blue (2014) screened at over 35 festivals, after great traction and funding from the Tribeca Film Institute. The short film tells the story of Black, an African American trans man, who works as a security guard inside an apartment complex in present-day Oakland, California. On the night of a 'stud party,' Black is forced to confront his pre-transition past, struggling to make his outside match his inside.

=== Other works ===
Taking a turn from self-written lesbian-focused films, she directed My Baby's Daddy starring Eddie Griffin, Michael Imperioli, and Anthony Anderson in 2004, although a character in the film turns out to be lesbian.

She directed The Owls, co-written with novelist Sarah Schulman, which made its debut at the Berlin International Film Festival. The film is about a group of "Older, Wiser Lesbians" (an acronym of which provides the title) who accidentally kill a younger woman and try to cover it up. The cast includes Guinevere Turner and V. S. Brodie, who had appeared together in the 1994 lesbian-themed film Go Fish and The Watermelon Woman, as well as Dunye, Lisa Gornick, Skyler Cooper, and Deak Evgenikos.

In 2010, Dunye's feature script Adventures in the 419, also co-written with Schulman, was selected as one of the works-in-progress films in the Tribeca All Access program during the 2010 Tribeca Film Festival. The film is set in Amsterdam and is about 419 scams among the immigrant community. A television adaptation of the film is currently in the works. Her romantic comedy Mommy is Coming was nominated for Best Feature Film at the 2012 Berlin Film Festival. She has expressed interest in adapting some literary works from Octavia Butler and Audre Lorde.

=== Television ===
In 2017, Dunye had her TV directorial debut with Ava DuVernay's Queen Sugar "as part of DuVernay's initiative to create opportunities for female film directors to enter the field of Television." She directed two episodes in its second season and in 2019 she served as the Producing Director of season 4. Her other episodic directing credits include Claws (TNT), The Fosters (Freeform), Love Is (OWN), The Chi (Showtime), Star (FOX), Dear White People (Netflix), David Makes Man (OWN), All Rise (CBS), Delilah (OWN), Lovecraft Country (HBO), Y: The Last Man (FX), and The Umbrella Academy (Netflix). and Bridgerton (Netflix), among others.

== Influences ==
Dunye cites numerous influences that have contributed to her work including that of Chantal Akerman, Woody Allen, Spike Lee, and Jean-Luc Godard but notes that Jim McBride's David Holzman's Diary (1967) and Charles Burnett's Killer of Sheep (1977) are some of the "most powerful" influences on her.

Her first video, Wild Thing, was an experimental adaptation of the live reading by the black lesbian author and poet Sapphire. Some of the other literary figures that Dunye recalls include Harriet Jacobs, Toni Morrison, Audre Lorde and Fannie Hurst. Notably she has remarked that her work often brings to mind, American experimental filmmaker Barbara Hammer. In terms of style and documentary filmmaking, she says that some of the most influential films for her are the works of Michelle Parkerson including her documentary about Audre Lorde and her film Stormé: The Lady of the Jewel Box. For Stranger Inside, Dunye has said that both the adaptations and the novel Imitation of Life played a major part in the mood of the film.

== Style ==
In Stranger Inside, Dunye mixes documentary and fiction, as some of the background actors were actual former inmates. The film was first conceived as a documentary feature, and it employs documentary techniques, but Dunye felt that a narrative approach would better suit the subject matter.

== Personal life ==
Dunye is a lesbian. She has two children. As of 2012, she resides with her spouse in Oakland, California. In 2018, Dunye created her production company, Jingletown Films, named after the neighborhood of Jingletown in Oakland that she once lived in. According to the company's website, its goal is to provide a platform for storytellers and filmmakers that are people of color and/or queer and to be a space for diverse artists to thrive and have their voices heard.

== Filmography ==
=== Film ===
Short film

Year	Title	Director	Writer	Producer	Editor	DoP
1990	Janine	Yes	No	No	No	No
1991	She Don't Fade	Yes	No	No	Yes	No
1992	Vanilla Sex	Yes	No	Yes	Yes	Yes
1993	An Untitled Portrait	Yes	No	No	No	No
1993	The Potluck and the Passion	Yes	No	No	No	No
1995	Greetings from Africa	Yes	No	Yes	No	No
2014	Black Is Blue	Yes	Yes	Yes	No	No
2014	Brother from Another Time	Yes	Yes	No	No	No

Feature film

Year	Title	Director	Writer	Producer
1996	The Watermelon Woman	Yes	Yes	Yes
2004	My Baby's Daddy	Yes	No	No
2010	The Owls	Yes	Yes	Yes
2012	Mommy Is Coming	Yes	Yes	Yes

Acting roles

Year	Title	Role
1991	She Don't Fade	Shae Clark
1995	Greetings from Africa	Cheryl
1996	The Watermelon Woman	Cheryl
2000	The New Women	Phaedra
2010	The Owls	Carol
2012	Mommy is Coming	Cabby
2018	Dropping Penny	Alpha Donna

==== Television ====
Year	Title	Director	Producer	Notes
2001	Stranger Inside	Yes	No	TV movie
2017–19	Queen Sugar	Yes	Yes	4 episodes
2018	The Fosters	Yes	No	Episode "Line in the Sand"
2018	Love Is	Yes	No	Episode "(His) Answers"
2018	Star	Yes	No	Episode "All Falls Down"
2018–21	Claws	Yes	No	2 episodes
2019	The Chi	Yes	No	Episode "A Leg Up"
2019	The Village	Yes	No	Episode "I Have Got You"
2019	Dear White People	Yes	No	Episode "Volume 3: Chapter V"
2019	David Makes Man	Yes	No	3 episodes
2019–21	All Rise	Yes	No	3 episodes
2020	Sacred Lies	Yes	No	2 episodes
2020	Lovecraft Country	Yes	No	Episode "Strange Case"
2021	Delilah	Yes	Yes	2 episodes
2021	Pride	Yes	No	Episode "1970s: The Vanguard of Struggle"
2021	Y: The Last Man	Yes	No	Episode "Peppers"
2022	Bridgerton	Yes	No	2 episodes
2022	The Umbrella Academy	Yes	No	2 episodes
2022	American Gigolo	Yes	No	Episode "Atomic"
2022	Manifest	Yes	No	Episode "Rendezvous"
2022–23	The Rookie: Feds	Yes	No	2 episodes
2022–24	The Equalizer	Yes	No	2 episodes
2024	Dead Boy Detectives	Yes	No	Episode "The Case of the Dandelion Shrine"
2025	You	Yes	No	Episode "Folie a Deux"
2025	The Hunting Wives	Yes	No	Episode "Not Her First Rodeo" and "Deep in the Heart of Texas"

== Awards ==
- 1991: Fine Cut Winner Independent Images: TV 12 WHYY Inc.
- 1995: Artist Mentor Residency Award Film Video Arts Inc.
- 1995: Media Production Award; National Endowment for the Arts
- 1995: Vito Russo Filmmaker Award; New York Lesbian, Gay, Bisexual, & Transgender Film Festival
- 1995: Ursula Award; Hamburg Lesbian & Gay Film Festival
- 1996: Audience Award at LA Outfest for Outstanding narrative feature - The Watermelon Woman
- 1996: Teddy Award at the Berlin International Film Festival for Best feature film - The Watermelon Woman
- 1996: Audience Award; Créteil International Women's Film Festival
- 1996: Audience Award; Torino International Gay & Lesbian Film Festival
- 1997: Biennial Anonymous Was A Woman Award
- 1998: The Rockefeller Foundation Award; The Rockefeller Foundation
- 2000: Best Director Award; Girlfriends
- 2001: Audience Award at LA Outfest
- 2001: Audience Award from the Philadelphia Film Festival, and the Audience Award from the San Francisco International Film Festival.
- 2001: Special Jury Award from the Miami Gay and Lesbian Film Festival - Stranger Inside
- 2001: Audience Award for best narrative feature - Stranger Inside
- 2002: Audience Award and Special Mention at the Créteil International Women's Film Festival for Stranger Inside
- 2002: London International Lesbian and Gay Film Festival; Best Feature Award
- 2002: Lifetime Achievement Award Girlfriends
- 2004: Community Vision Award; National Center for Lesbian Rights
- 2016: The Guggenheim Fellowship Award; John Simon Guggenheim Memorial Foundation
- 2019: José Muñoz Award from CLAGS: The Center for LGBTQ Studies at the CUNY Graduate Center
- 2020: Outstanding Directing in a Comedy Series; Black Reel Awards for Television - Dear White People
- 2022: Cinema Eye Legacy Award - The Watermelon Woman
- 2023: Brudner Prize, Yale University
- 2026: Career Achievement Award, 62nd Chicago International Film Festival

== See also ==
- List of female film and television directors
- List of lesbian filmmakers
- List of LGBT films directed by women
