= Netalie Braun =

Israeli poet, writer and filmmaker

Netalie Braun נטעלי בראון
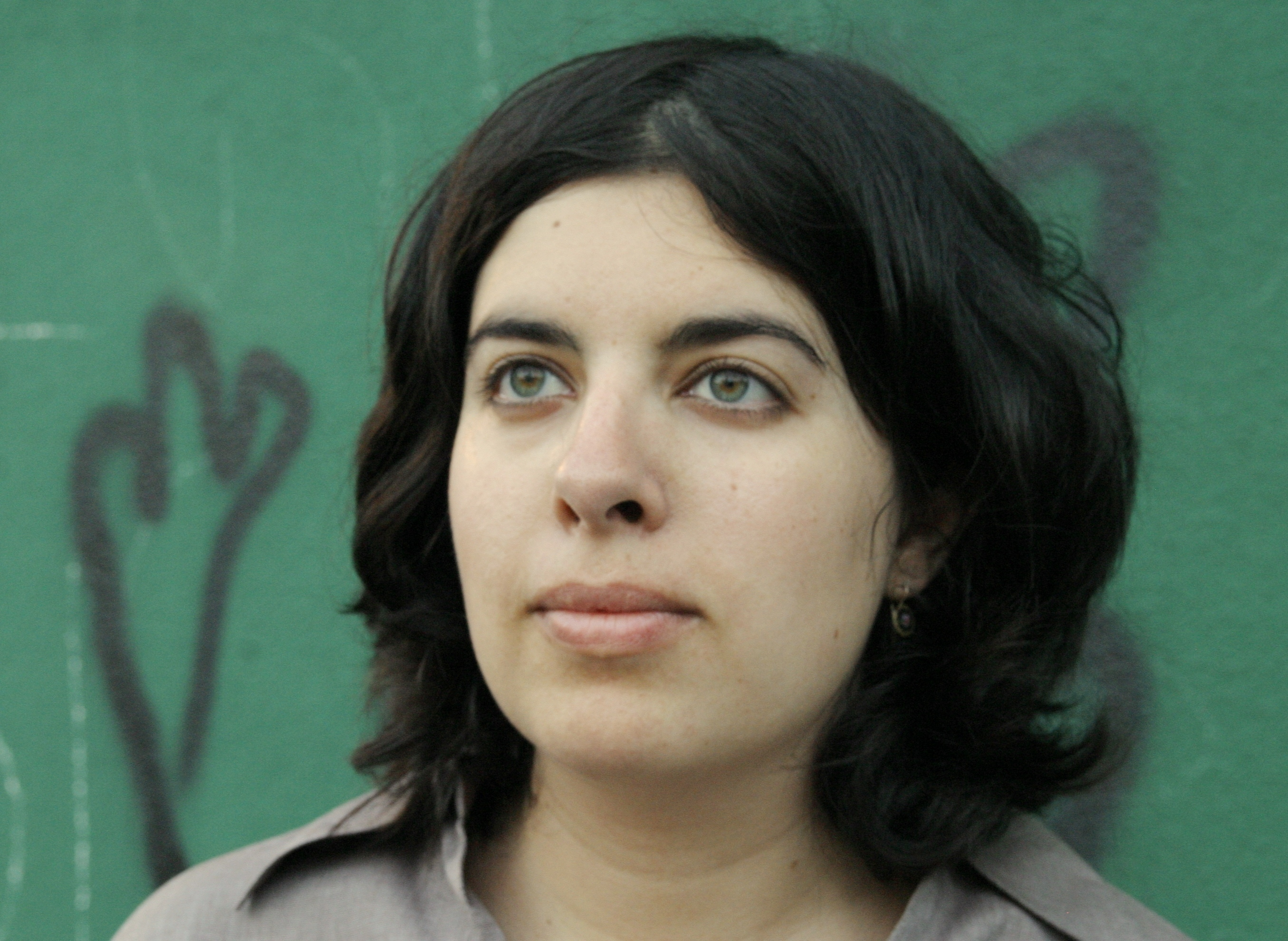
- Born: June 12, 1978 (age 47)
- Occupations: Filmmaker, poet

Netalie Braun (Hebrew: נטעלי בראון; born June 12, 1978) is an Israeli poet, writer and filmmaker. She won the 2017 Ophir Award for the best short documentary film.

== Career ==
Braun completed her BA in literature and philosophy, and an MA in film at Tel Aviv University. She also completed a poetry course at Helicon.

=== Film ===
Braun makes both documentary and narrative films. Her two short fiction films Tabur (2004) and The Last Supper of N. Braun (2005) were screened at film festivals in Israel and around the world.

Her documentary Metamorphosis (2006), which weaves together testimonies by women who were victims of rape with myths about sexual violence, was released to rave reviews. It premiered at the Jerusalem Film Festival and was shown at many international film festivals. It was broadcast on Israel's Channel One and at a United Nations convention on the status of women. Metamorphosis won the 2006 Aliza Shagrir Award for the best documentary film and the Association for the Study of Trauma and Dissociation's International Media Award.

Braun's short film Gevald (2008) had its international premiere in the Panorama section of the Berlin International Film Festival, followed by many international screenings. It won first place at the Tel Aviv LGBT Film Festival, at the Paris Queer Film Festival, and at the Goethe Institut's competition for films dealing with human rights.

Hatalyan, the documentary film that Braun produced and directed with Avigail Sperber, is about Adolf Eichmann's hangman Shalom Nagar. The film was broadcast on YES, and won first place at the Haifa International Film Festival of 2010. It was a finalist for the best short documentary at IDFA, and won the 2011 best documentary award at the Forum of Documentary Filmmakers competition.

Her short film Vow won the short independent film awards at the Jerusalem Film Festival of 2014, the best directing award in the Independent Films competition of the Student Film Festival (2015) and first prize at the Seoul International Women's Film Festival (2015).

Braun's documentary film, Hope I'm in the Frame, about director and actor Michal Bat-Adam, received a special mention at Docaviv film festival (2017), and the Ophir Award for best short documentary.

Braun was the art director for the International Women's Film Festival In Rehovot between 2011 and 2013.

In 2018, Braun was selected to participate in the first documentary filmmakers lab conducted by the Van Leer Jerusalem Institute, in cooperation with the Forum of Documentary Filmmakers, which will take place in 2019, to work on her documentary film about the movement to build the Third Temple.

=== Poetry ===
In 2005 Braun won first prize in the Tel Aviv municipality competition "Poetry Along the Way", in which poems are displayed in public areas such as bus stations and wall of buildings. One of the prizes was funding for publication of her first collection, To Kill and to Breathe, which was published in 2006.

== Personal life ==
Braun was in a relationship with Avigail Sperber, and they had one child. After they broke up, Braun remarried and had another child. They also collaborated on Metamorphosis, Gevald, and Hatalyan (The Hangman).

== Awards ==
Year	Nominated work	Category	Result	Notes
2004	Last Supper of N. Braun	Special mention, Jerusalem Film Festival	Won	
2004	Last Supper of N. Braun	Best Short Film, Tokyo Short Film Festival	Won	
2004	Last Supper of N. Braun	Best Short Film, VGIK Moscow Student Film Festival	Won	
2011	Gevald	Best Short Documentary, Paris Lesbian and Feminist Film Festival	Won	
2014	Vow	Best Independent Short Film, Jerusalem Film Festival	Won	
2014	Vow	Best Short Screenplay, Galilee Film Festival	Won	
2017	Hope I'm in the Frame	Special Honorable Mention, DocAviv Documentary Film Festival	Won	
2018	Hope I'm in the Frame	Best Documentary in Cinema, Master of Art Film Festival	Won	

== Filmography ==
Year	Title	Role	Notes
2004	Tabur	Director	Short film
2005	Last Supper of N. Braun	Director	Short film
2005	Metamorphosis	Director, writer	Short documentary
2008	Gevald	Director, producer, writer	Short documentary
2010	Hatalyan	Co-director (Avigail Sperber), producer	Documentary
2014	Vow	Director, producer, writer	Short film
2017	Hope I'm in the Frame	Director, producer, cinematographer	Documentary

== See also ==
- List of female film and television directors
- List of lesbian filmmakers
