= Shalom Nagar =

Israeli prison guard and executioner

- שלום נגר
- Shalom Nagar in 2010
- Born: 1936 or 1938; Yemen
- Died: 26 November 2024 (aged 86 or 88); Israel
- Occupations: Prison guard, kosher slaughterer
- Known for: Executing Adolf Eichmann
- Spouse: Ora Nagar
- Children: 4

Shalom Nagar (Hebrew: שלום נגר; 1936 or 1938 – 26 November 2024) was a Israeli prison guard best known for executing Nazi war criminal Adolf Eichmann by hanging.

Nagar immigrated to Israel in 1948 and served in the Israel Defense Forces' Paratroopers Brigade. At this time he abandoned his traditional Jewish beliefs and became secular. After leaving the army, Nagar worked for the Israel Border Police and subsequently joined the Israel Prison Service, where he was stationed at Ramla Prison. Here he became one of 22 guards assigned to Eichmann during his trial and imprisonment. He was selected to carry out Eichmann's execution, reportedly through a lottery, though this has been questioned by later commentators. Afterwards he suffered from post-traumatic stress disorder and nightmares. This led him to return to religion. His role as executioner was kept secret for 30 years due to security concerns and was revealed only in 1992.

Later, Nagar worked as a prison guard in Hebron and as a kosher butcher. He helped establish the Kiryat Arba settlement and was present at the Cave of the Patriarchs massacre, at which 29 Palestinians were killed. He left Kiryat Arba soon afterwards. His story was featured in the 2010 documentary The Hangman (התליין) and inspired the novel Eichmann's Executioner.

== Early life ==
Shalom Nagar was born into a religious Jewish family in Yemen in the mid-to-late 1930s. Sources differ as to the exact year: in their obituaries Haaretz and The Times of Israel report his year of birth as 1936, whereas The Jerusalem Post reports 1938.

The New York Times described details of Nagar's early childhood as "sketchy", but noted that in interviews he said his father died when he was seven. In a 2004 interview with the Jewish magazine Mishpacha, he recalled his father searching for caves in which to hide in the event of a Nazi invasion of Yemen.

In the same interview, Nagar recounted that after his father's death, his mother remarried, and her new husband did not fulfill a promise to take in her children. Some of his siblings were married off or taken in by other relatives, with Nagar mentioning three brothers and two sisters in total. Nagar consequently lived on the streets from the age of seven, according to his son Boaz. To avoid being forced to convert to Islam in a state-run orphanage, Nagar said that he "made sure to find shelter among the Jews," sleeping under market stalls in Sanaa, wrapped in his father's goat-skin tallit (a prayer shawl) and working odd jobs, including as a porter.

Nagar made his way to Israel in 1948, around the time of its declaration of statehood. He told Mishpacha that he and one brother traveled on foot through the desert to Aden, and covered each other with sand at night for warmth. In Aden they boarded airlifts organized by the Rescue Committee of the Jewish Agency. He recalled that his payot (sidelocks) were cut off as, he was told, in Israel there was no need for them to be used to distinguish Jews from Arabs.

Nagar and his brother were taken to Kibbutz Shefayim. He later said they were shocked at the lack of religious observance and gender separation, and feared it was an attempt to convert them away from Judaism. Describing his reaction, he said, "no washing, no brachot, no head coverings— what kind of Jews were these?" He and his brother ran away to the Rosh HaAyin transit camp, and Nagar was subsequently sent to Kfar Haroeh, a nearby religious Moshav. At the age of 16, Nagar joined the Israel Defense Forces, and two years later, he joined the army's elite Paratroopers Brigade. During this period, in the mid-1950s, he abandoned his traditional Jewish beliefs and became secular. While in the army he also worked as a sapper, dismantling landmines. After completing his military service, he worked for the border police and joined the Israel Prison Service.

== Execution of Adolf Eichmann ==
Adolf Eichmann was a high-ranking Nazi Party official who played a key role in planning and executing the Holocaust. As one of the architects of the Final Solution, Eichmann had been in charge of Jewish affairs and deportations. He organized the forced removal of hundreds of thousands of Jews from Germany and the occupied areas of Europe, arranging transport trains to ghettos and extermination camps. Eichmann coordinated with other Nazi officials to ensure the systematic deportation and murder of Jews, and was deeply involved in operations such as the deportation of 440,000 Hungarian Jews to Auschwitz in 1944.

Eichmann was held at Ayalon Prison in Ramla in the early 1960s during the trial for his role in the Holocaust. The prime minister at the time of the trial, David Ben-Gurion, ensured that the prison officers guarding Eichmann were not Ashkenazi Jews, instead selecting those whose ancestry could be traced to the Middle East, North Africa or Spain. He felt that those whose families had been killed in the Holocaust would be motivated to harm the prisoner. This was to be prevented as, in Nagar's words, the government wanted the "zechut" (privilege) of killing him. Ashkenazi guards and those who survived the concentration camps were banned from the prison's second floor, where Eichmann's cell was located. Nagar was working at the prison during this period, and was designated as one of 22 known as the "Eichmann guards", handpicked for duties in what they referred to as the prisoner's "apartment".

Nagar recalled that before it was made clear Ashkenazi guards were barred from the prison's second floor, he once swapped duties with a guard who had a identification tattoo on his arm. At the door of Eichmann's cell, the guard rolled up his sleeve and confronted Eichmann, who responded by shouting in German. From then on, Nagar later said, the instructions were clear: "no switching or we'd get court-martialed".

Legal scholar Itamar Mann has written that Nagar's selection because of his Mizrahi background aimed to make clear the distinction between criminal punishment and revenge. In the 2010 documentary The Hangman, Nagar said that as a Yemenite, he did not know who Eichmann was until he had to guard him.

Suicide watch was a key duty. These guards were also charged with testing food given to the prisoner, for fear someone would try to poison him. In The Hangman, Nagar said that when he asked his commander, "Why do I have to taste the food?", he was told that the death of one Yemenite would be "no great loss", but the death of Eichmann would be more significant because of the worldwide coverage of the trial. Mann gives this as an example of the need to try a perpetrator being given more importance than contemporary human life.

Nagar guarded Eichmann for six months, and was always in the presence of other guards. After Eichmann was sentenced to death in December 1961, according to Nagar, so many people wanted to be the executioner that a lottery was held to decide who would do the job. At the time he was selected, Nagar was on furlough and did not want the duty. According to Mann, the fact that Nagar did not want the role of executioner made him especially suited to it, again due to the distinction necessary between Eichmann's punishment and revenge. In 2004, he told Mishpacha magazine that he was the only one who refused the role, but was convinced to accept it after being shown pictures of Holocaust atrocities against children. He is quoted as saying, "I was so shaken that I agreed to whatever had to be done". In contrast, in The Hangman he said that ultimately he was ordered to carry out the execution, quoting his commander as saying "It's an order. The lot fell on you. You'll do it". In +972 Magazine, Batya Shimony questions whether a lottery was ever actually held, asking why it was so important to give the job to a Yemenite when there were many other volunteers. Mann reports that in conversation with Netalie Braun, director of The Hangman, Braun suggested that the lottery was a lie told to trick Nagar into carrying out the execution.

Mann believes that Nagar's role as executioner was the result of the "hierarchical relationship" between Ashkenazi and non-Ashkenazi guards; they knew that Nagar would be sacrificed by executing Eichmann, but that it did not matter because he was a Yemenite, and it was for the greater good of alleviating the trauma of the Holocaust's victims.

Such was the secrecy around the execution that, according to Nagar, his commander collected him for the duty by bundling him into a car while he was out walking with his wife, Ora Nagar, and their infant son in their Holon neighborhood. Nagar said he was concerned that she would believe he had been kidnapped, so he and his commander returned to say he had been called in as the prison was short-staffed.

The execution by hanging took place around midnight on 1 June 1962 in the Ayalon Prison. (Note: According to a 1963 eyewitness account from William Lovell Hull, the hanging took place at 12:02 am on 1 June. Contemporaneous reporting in The New York Times, written on 31 May and published on 1 June, describes it as taking place "just before last midnight". Obituaries of Nagar subsequently placed the time of execution between 30 May and 1 June.) This was the only judicial execution ever held in Israel. Nagar described arriving at the gallows when Eichmann already had the noose around his neck and was standing over a trapdoor. While an official account states that there were two people who pulled a lever simultaneously to carry out the execution, Nagar did not recall anyone else being there. He said that he looked into Eichmann's eyes before stepping behind a screen to pull the lever. After an hour, Nagar took the body down from the scaffold. He told Mishpacha that the loud gasping sound of air being released from the corpse's lungs made him feel that "the Angel of Death had come to take me too". Afterwards, it was Nagar's job to take the corpse for cremation in an oven symbolically built by a concentration camp survivor. He later said that he had difficulty walking unaided and trembled so much that the body rolled from side to side as he pushed it into the oven.

Eichmann's ashes were later scattered at sea, beyond Israel's territorial waters. According to Mishpacha, it was planned that Nagar would take them to the port of Jaffa, but he was so traumatized by the hanging that he was escorted home, and a police van transported the ashes. Nagar's clothes were bloodied from where the rope had torn Eichmann's skin. He recalled that his wife was hysterical at the sight of this, and thought he had been beaten up in a fight, saying that there is no blood at a hanging. Nagar responded, "Wait until morning and you'll hear the news". The following morning, Kol Yisrael broadcast a brief, one-line announcement of the execution, without naming Nagar.

Nagar was given a two-week vacation and sent to complete his high school equivalency exams, subsequently returning to work as the prison's switchboard operator. He had to pass Eichmann's cell to get to his office. Such was his fear of this that he said that he had two guards escort him every day. He once tried it alone, but fell down the stairs when he was startled by his own shadow on a glass door, thinking it was Eichmann's ghost. In the following years, Nagar suffered from post-traumatic stress disorder and nightmares, and feared Eichmann was following him. In The Hangman, Nagar said of this period: "After that I became religious. I started wearing a yarmulke and going to synagogue, praying, putting on tefillin, keeping the Sabbath. I went to study ritual slaughter. And I kept at it. I felt better".

Mann claims that after the execution, Nagar became aware of his "subjugation" as a Mizrahi. He explains that the separation of punishment and revenge relied on imposing the "dirty work" of execution on a disempowered member of society, casting them as an outsider whose membership in the Jewish community was dependent on detachment from "our founding trauma". Mann argues that Nagar functioned as a scapegoat: attempting to heal victims of the Holocaust resulted in the transfer of trauma to him. This, Mann argues, helps us understand the "circles of potential harms of criminal adjudication".

== Later years ==
After the Six-Day War in 1967, Nagar was transferred to the military compound in Hebron. Here he served as a security officer and later a prison administrator. He was one of the first Israelis to guard imprisoned Palestinians under the newly formed Israeli Military Administration. He later recounted that the wardens and officers there would sometimes physically abuse prisoners, and gave an example of when guards forced a father and son to physically fight. Discussing the incident in The Hangman, he said that this broke his heart, and incidents like that made him cry. As deputy warden at the prison, he dismissed guards involved in this activity, and recounted allowing the prisoners out in the yard against protocol. He said of the prisoners, "I pity them, even if they're terrorists ... Man shouldn't feel superior to his fellow man. Don't look down on even the simplest man".

During this period, Nagar developed close ties with the area's religious settlers. He was among the earliest settlers in Kiryat Arba, an urban Israeli settlement in the West Bank, where he purchased a plot of land and lived for several years with his wife. Nagar claimed to have been the first to suggest that settler leader Moshe Levinger and the 14 families who originally settled in Hebron be given living quarters converted from the former stables of King Hussein of Jordan.

In 1986, Nagar was asked if he would carry out the execution of Ivan Demjanjuk, a guard at Sobibor extermination camp. He refused, later saying he had "had enough trauma". Nagar retired from the Prison Service later that year, having worked there for at least 26 years. At this point, Nagar regrew his peyot and a beard, and was encouraged by Rabbi Amnon Yitzchak to join a kollel (an institute for Talmudic study). He then split his time between his studies and working as a certified shochet (kosher slaughterer). He slaughtered chickens for kapparos, and sheep for special occasions at Sephardi yeshivos across the country.

Nagar's identity as Eichmann's executioner was kept secret for 30 years due to fear of reprisals from neo-Nazis, until Israeli journalists discovered and revealed it in 1992. They had been researching a radio program on the anniversary of Eichmann's death, reviewing prison records and talking to former prison employees. He said that he was sworn to secrecy over the execution, but after Mossad chief Isser Harel had published a book about Eichmann's capture he felt he had nothing to fear, saying: "Besides, I was involved in the great mitzvah of wiping out Amalek", referring to a biblical commandment in Judaism to erase the memory of an enemy nation of the Israelites.

Nagar was present at the Cave of the Patriarchs massacre, in which 29 Palestinians were killed by far-right Zionist extremist Baruch Goldstein, in Hebron in 1994. In The Hangman, he describes hearing gunshots, picking up his weapon, and holding closed the door to Abraham's tomb while Goldstein tried to get him to open it. Soon after, he moved his family back to Holon, later saying that he was unwilling to continue to live "in that kind of situation". In The Hangman, Nagar said that he still did not understand why Goldstein carried out the shooting: "It pains him that Jews are being killed, but it doesn't pain him to kill Arabs? Arabs were created in God's image too."

According to the Jewish Herald-Voice, when a German media outlet asked to interview Nagar in 2004 he insisted that the interview take place in his kollel. The paper described the "Jewish study hall" as being "anything but quiet", scattered with books and filled with loud, argumentative voices. When the German reporter asked why he wanted to be interviewed in such a noisy environment, Nagar responded that he wanted any television interview, likely to be watched by millions of Germans, to show that the Jewish people were thriving on the values, culture and traditions that "Hitler and Eichmann ... wanted to decimate".

In 2012, fifty years after Eichmann's execution, Nagar was invited to the opening of an exhibition on Eichmann's capture at the Museum of the Jewish Diaspora. In an interview with NRG Ma'ariv, he remarked that he had not been invited to the Holocaust museum at Yad Vashem, and expressed the view that he would have received more recognition had he been Ashkenazi rather than Yemeni.

In his mid-seventies, Nagar was still working as a kosher slaughterer in Holon. Writing for Jewish News Syndicate, Gabriel Erem described Nagar as "soft-spoken" and "pious". Erem described in 2021 hearing of Nagar's poor medical condition and modest home, and rallying descendants of Holocaust families to finance "a suitable, medically supervised, first-rate senior home for the last living hero of an era". Nagar died on 26 November 2024, with reports placing his age at either 86 or 88. He was survived by his wife Ora and three of their four children; his son Noam had died following a cancer diagnosis.

== Depiction in media ==
Nagar was the subject of a 2010 documentary, The Hangman (התליין), by Avigail Sperber and Netalie Braun. The film was produced with support from the Foundation for Jewish Culture's Lynn and Jules Kroll Fund for Jewish Documentary Film. It won the Best Documentary award at the Haifa International Film Festival. It is dedicated to the memory of Nagar's son Noam, and includes footage from his funeral. Renee Ghert-Zand wrote for The Forward that after seeing The Hangman, she thought of Shalom Nagar as "the Forrest Gump of Israel". She explained: "Like the character played by Tom Hanks, Nagar improbably finds himself in the midst of historical events and meeting famous (infamous, really) people". She concluded that "the look in Nagar's eyes ... suggests more to this real-life character than religious platitudes and an affable nature". Legal scholar Itamar Mann describes the film as "an implicit critique of mass atrocity adjudication", situating it alongside critiques by Hannah Arendt and Shoshana Felman in his essay The Hangman's Perspective.

A German-language novelization of his story, Nagars Nacht ("Nagar's Night"), by Astrid Dehe and Achim Engstler, was published in 2014. It was translated into English by Helen MacCormac and Alyson Coombes, and published as Eichmann's Executioner in 2017. Library Journal said of the translation: "The weaving of past with present, fact with fiction brings Eichmann alive and even humanizes him, a feat that impressively expands our understanding of the Holocaust".
