= Avigail Sperber =

Israeli cinematographer, film director, and LGBTQ+ activist

Avigail Sperber אביגיל שפרבר
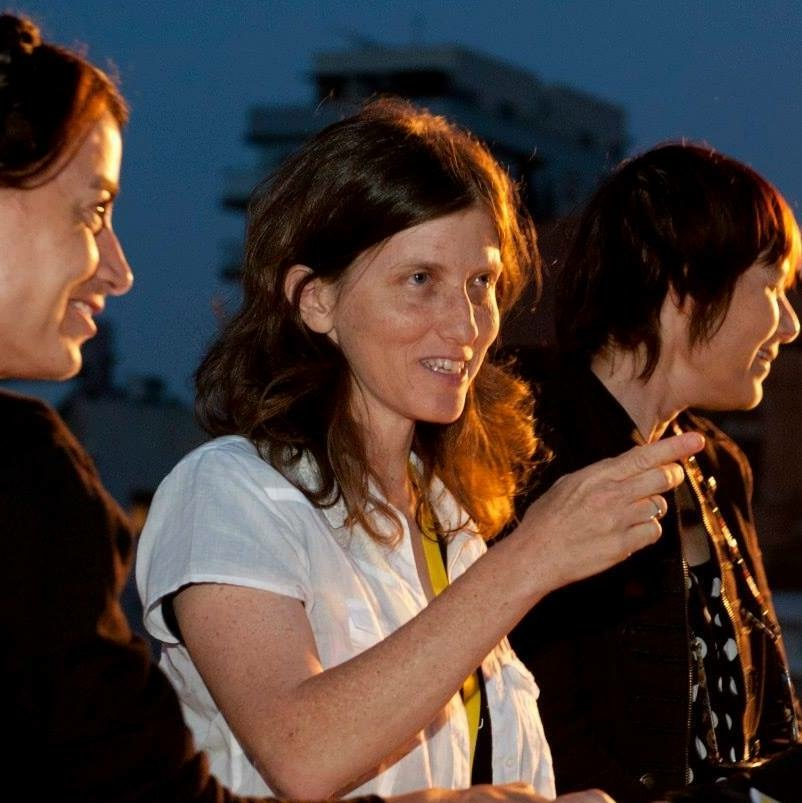
- Born: August 24, 1973 (age 52); Jerusalem
- Occupations: Film producer, cinematographer, film director

Avigail Sperber (Hebrew: אביגיל שפרבר; born August 24, 1973) is an Israeli cinematographer and film and television director. She is founder and owner of Pardes Film Productions. Sperber is also a social activist, and the founder of Bat Kol, a religious organization for lesbian Orthodox Jews.

== Biography ==
Sperber was born in the Katamon neighborhood of Jerusalem, the daughter of Hannah and Rabbi Daniel Sperber, winner of the Israel Prize for Talmudic study. She studied at the Horev Ulpana (girls' religious school) and did Sherut Leumi instead of mandatory military service.

In 1998 she completed her studies at Ma'aleh Film School. Her graduation film, Four Men Entered the Grove, won the best film award of her graduating class. Another film she directed, Yan's Tea House, won the best documentary film award at the Haifa International Film Festival.

In 1999, Sperber directed My Sister Benchia, the story of Benchia-Ariela, an Ethiopian girl she met during her national service, whom her family adopted. The film was broadcast on Channel 2.

Sperber worked on the production of the film Campfire, in casting and as the director, Yosef Cedar's, personal assistant, while studying screenwriting at Idit Schori's screenwriting school. Her graduation work was about religious lesbians. Following her work on this script, she founded Bat Kol, an organization for religious lesbians. It was the first religious LGBT organization in Israel. The organization provides support for religious lesbians. Sperber also founded Shoval, which is a dialogue and advocacy group that works for LGBT acceptance in religious society, and operates a support and counseling hotline. These organizations created a new discourse in religious circles, forcing the community to deal with the issue.

She was cinematographer on her ex-girlfriend Netalie Braun's short films Gevald and Metamorphosis; on the Ibtisam Mara'ana's film Badal; on Hannah Azoulay-Hasafri's documentary series My Tiny Empire. In 2008 she directed the film Halakeh, which premiered at the Jerusalem Film Festival and was broadcast on Channel 1. In 2010 she produced and directed Hatalyan with Netalie Braun, a documentary of the story of Shalom Nagar, Adolf Eichmann's executioner. The film won the Best Documentary award at the Haifa International Film Festival, and was one of three outstanding films at IDFA. In 2014, she directed Probation Time, a documentary about her break-up with her partner and their son's difficulties dealing with the new situation, and her family's coping with her adopted sister, who dealt with juvenile delinquency. The film won the DocAviv jury award, and Sperber also won the cinematography award. The film was broadcast on YES Docu as a mini-series.

In September 2017, Sperber was awarded the Minister of Education Award for Jewish Culture in the film category.

Sperber came out as a lesbian at age 25. She has two sons.

== Filmography ==
=== Director ===
| Title | Genre | Length | Year | Notes |
|---|---|---|---|---|
| Probation Time | Documentary series | 3 50-minute episodes | 2014 | Broadcast on YES Docu |
| Hatalyan | Documentary film | 60 minutes | 2010 | Haifa International Film Festival Best Documentary |
| Halakeh | Drama | 50 minutes | 2008 | Jerusalem Film Festival Best Picture; broadcast on Channel 1 |
| Hatikva | Short experimental film | | 2004 | Part of Hatikva (Hope) project at Haifa International Film Festival |
| Cyprus Meeting | Documentary film | 24 minutes | 2001 | Broadcast on Channel 2 |
| My Sister Benchia | Documentary film | 24 minutes | 1999 | Broadcast on Channel 2 |
| Four Men Entered the Grove | Student short film | 12 minutes | 1998 | Ma'aleh Film School |
| Yan's Tea House | Student short film | 24 minutes | 1998 | Ma'aleh Film School |

=== Production ===
| Title | Genre | Length | Year | Notes |
|---|---|---|---|---|
| Not Nice | Documentary film | 60 minutes | 2018 | |
| A Mirror for the Sun | Documentary film | 70 minutes | 2018 | Channel 10 |
| A Person's Self | Documentary film | 70 minutes | 2018 | YES Docu |
| Covered Up | Documentary film | 52 minutes | 2018 | YES Docu, DocAviv |
| Family Matters | Documentary film | 60 minutes | 2015 | YES Docu, New Film Fund |
| Hatalyan | Documentary film | 60 minutes | 2010 | Gesher Foundation, Rabinowitz Foundation |
| Four Men Entered the Grove | Student feature film | 12 minutes | 1998 | Ma'aleh Film School |

=== Cinematography ===
| Title | Genre | Length | Year | Notes |
|---|---|---|---|---|
| A Person's Self | Documentary film | 70 minutes | 2018 | YES Docu |
| Covered Up | Documentary film | 60 minutes | 2018 | YES Docu, DocAviv |
| HaTsarfoka'im | Documentary film | 60 minutes | 2018 | Ron Kachlili documentary series, YES Docu |
| The Youngest | Short film | | 2018 | |
| God Deserves a House | Documentary film | | 2018 | |
| Assumption | Video Art | | 2017 | Mekudeshet Festival |
| Armed | Documentary web series | | 2017 | Kan - Israeli Public Broadcasting Corporation |
| How to Mark Love | Documentary film | 75 minutes | | Channel 8 |
| Child Mother | Documentary film | 80 minutes | 2016 | Channel 8 |
| Golden Boys | Documentary film | 56 minutes | 2016 | Channel 8 |
| Achlu Li Shatu Li - Next Generation | TV documentary mini-series | | 2016 | Channel 8 |
| Blue Eyes: Brown Eyes | Documentary film | | 2016 | |
| Family Matters | Documentary film | 60 minutes | 2015 | YES Docu, New Film Fund |
| Arab Movie | Documentary film | 60 minutes | 2015 | |
| Probation Time | Documentary series | 3 50-minute episodes | 2014 | YES Docu |
| A Song of Loves - Rabi David Buzaglo | Documentary film | 60 minutes | 2014 | Channel 2 |
| Arsim and Frehot: The New Elites | TV documentary mini-series | 60 minutes | 2014 | 1 episode, Channel 8 |
| Superwomen | Documentary film | | 2012 | DocAviv Special Mention and Best Cinematography |
| The Dreamers | Documentary film | | 2011 | Directed by Efrat Shalom Danon |
| Hatalyan | Documentary film | 60 minutes | 2010 | |
| Queen Khantarisha | Documentary film | | 2009 | |
| Lashabiya | Video art | | 2009 | With Yechezkel Lazarov |
| Gevald | Short film | | 2009 | Berlin International Film Festival winner; directed by Netalie Braun |
| Two Legacies | Documentary film | | 2008 | Directed by Einat Kapah |
| Shahida | Documentary film | | 2008 | |
| Summer Camp | Video art | | 2007 | Yael Barthana; displayed in museums worldwide |
| Gole Sangam | Video documentary | | 2007 | Directed by Sarit Haimiyan |
| Metamorphosis | Video documentary | | 2006 | Directed by Netalie Braun |
| My Tiny Empire | TV documentary mini-series | | 2006 | Reshet |
| Pickles | Documentary film | | 2005 | Directed by Dalit Kimor |
| Badal | Documentary film | | 2005 | Directed by Ibtisam Mara'ana |
| Salma beneath two skies | Documentary film | | 2005 | Made for ZDF, Germany |
| Keep Not Silent | Documentary film | | 2004 | |
| She'Asani Kirtsono | Documentary film | | 2003 | Directed by Iris Rubin |
| Yam. Suf. | Documentary film | | 2002 | YES Docu; directed by Nurit Akabes |
| Profile | Video art | | 2000 | Yael Barthana |
| Kaddish for Naomi | Documentary film | | | Directed by Avi Hemi |
| She'Asani Isha | Documentary film | | | Directed by Yakov Friedland |
| Regards from Rhodes | Documentary film | | 1998 | |
| Anashim | Short film | | 1998 | |
| Bride's Wind | Short film | | 1998 | |

=== Awards ===
| Year | Nominated work | Category | Result | Notes |
|---|---|---|---|---|
| 2017 | | Minister of Education Award for Jewish Culture | Won | |
| 2014 | Probation Time | Best Film, DocAviv | Won | |
| 2014 | Probation Time | Best Cinematography, DocAviv | Won | |
| 2014 | Probation Time | Best Film, Forum of Documentary Filmmakers Awards | Won | |
| 2014 | Probation Time | Best Cinematography, Forum of Documentary Filmmakers Awards | Won | |
| 2013 | Superwomen | Best Cinematography, DocAviv | Won | |
| 2011 | Hatalyan | Best Film, Documentary Film Competition | Won | |
| 2011 | Hatalyan | Best Cinematography, Documentary Film Competition | Won | |
| 2010 | Hatalyan | Special Honorable Mention, IDFA | Won | |
| 2010 | Hatalyan | Best Documentary, Haifa International Film Festival | Won | |

== See also ==
- List of female film and television directors
- List of lesbian filmmakers
