= Yoruba Richen =

American film producer

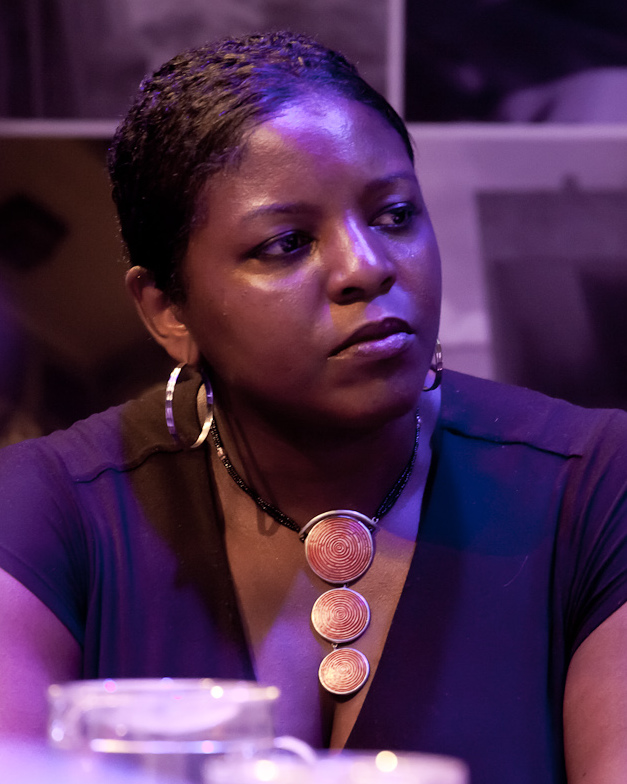
- Richen in 2012
- Born: 1972 (age 53–54); New York, New York
- Education: Brown University
- Occupations: Director, screenwriter, producer
- Known for: The New Black

Yoruba Richen (born 1972, in New York City, New York) is an American film director, screenwriter and producer. Her work has been featured on PBS, New York Times Op Doc, Frontline Digital, New York Magazine's website -The Cut, The Atlantic and Field of Vision. Her film The Green Book: Guide to Freedom was broadcast on the Smithsonian Channel to record audiences and was awarded the Henry Hampton Award for Excellence in Documentary Filmmaking.

== Work ==
Richen produced and directed The New Black (2013), which won the audience award at AFI Docs, Frameline Film Festival and Philly Q Fest. It also won best documentary at Urbanworld Film Festival. The New Black was nominated for an NAACP Image Award and a GLAAD Media Award for Outstanding Documentary.

Her film Promised Land received a Diverse Voices Co-Production fund award from the Corporation for Public Broadcasting and was broadcast on PBS's POV in 2010. In 2007, she won a Fulbright award in filmmaking and traveled to Brazil, where she began production on Sisters of the Good Death, a documentary about the oldest African women's association in the Americas and the annual festival they hold celebrating the end of slavery. Yoruba won a Clio award for her short film about the Grammy-nominated singer Andra Day.

Richen has also won Creative Promise Award at Tribeca All Access and was a Sundance Producers Fellow. She is a featured TED Speaker, a Fulbright fellow, a Guggenheim fellow and a 2016 recipient of the Chicken & Egg Breakthrough Filmmaker Award. Richen was chosen for the Root 100s list of African Americans 45 years old and younger who are responsible for the year's most significant moments and themes. She is the Founding Director of the Documentary Program at the Craig Newmark Graduate School of Journalism at CUNY.

== Education and early career ==
Richen is a graduate of Brown University, and lived in San Francisco for a time before moving back to New York City, where she worked for ABC News as an associate producer for the investigative unit of ABC News as well as a producer for the independent news program Democracy Now!.

== Filmography ==
Year	Film	Director	Producer	Co-producer	Other
2001	Take It From Me			Yes	
2004	Brother to Brother				Associate producer
2009	Promised Land	Yes	Yes		
2013	The New Black	Yes	Yes		Co-writer
2014	Out in the Night		Yes		
2019	The Green Book: Guide to Freedom	Yes			Author
2020	The Sit-In: Harry Belafonte Hosts the Tonight Show	Yes			Co-writer
2020	The Killing of Breonna Taylor	Yes	Yes		
2021	How It Feels To Be Free	Yes			
2022	American Reckoning			Yes	Co-director

== See also ==
- LGBT culture in New York City
- List of female film and television directors
- List of lesbian filmmakers
- List of LGBT-related films directed by women
- List of LGBT people from New York City
- NYC Pride March
