= Katrina del Mar =

American photographer and film director

- Occupations: Film director, producer, screenwriter, photographer
- Known for: Gang Girls 2000; Surf Gang; Hell on Wheels Gang Girls Forever
- Website: katrinadelmar.com

Katrina del Mar is a New York–based American photographer, video artist, writer and award-winning filmmaker. She is the recipient of numerous awards and fellowships, including the New York Foundation for the Arts (NYFA) Fellowship in Video, and her films have been screened at numerous festivals internationally. Del Mar has been described as "the lesbian Russ Meyer." Her aesthetic is informed by riot grrrl and 1970s punk.

== Early life ==
Del Mar grew up in Wisconsin and New Jersey. She is the daughter of American painter William P. Campbell.

== Career ==
Del Mar is an active singer and guitarist for New York-based punk/ queercore/ no-wave band The Shirtlifters, formed with Craig Flanagin of God Is My Co-Pilot, bassist Dan Whalen, drummer Genny Slag, and vocalist Normandy Sherwood. The group recently recorded an album with legendary punk producer Don Fury. She also creates zines.

Teaching credits include the University of Arts in Bremen, Germany, where Del Mar conducted the first ever "Queer Trash Feminist Film Workshop," in 2010. In 2012, she presented a series of films and photographs from the Golden Age of Performance Art (1988–2000) with Dona Ann McAdams at Warehouse 9, Copenhagen, Denmark.

Her portraits have been noted for their intensity of character and have been used by music labels (Sony, Polygram, V2), books, and other mediums.

Del Mar's work has included music videos that have been accepted to MTV/ Logo Networks: "Bringin Me Down" (2009) and "Brooklyn Girls" (2009) for groups GSX and Hooray for Goodbye respectively.

As a filmmaker her credits include (as producer/director) Surf Gang, Gang Girls 2000, Non Dairy Creamer and Nothin' Pretty. Her films have invited comparisons to American avant-garde filmmaker Kenneth Anger. Del Mar's film endeavor entitled Hell on Wheels, Gang Girls Forever was completed in 2009 and released in 2010 at Anthology Film Archives for a sold out premiere screening.

In 2014–2015, del Mar created an ongoing semi-surreal experimental documentary style web series called delMarvelous: A Day in the Life that American poet Eileen Myles described as "visual poems from a speedy person". Twenty episodes have been released so far.

Upcoming projects include her first feature narrative film; and An Artist Working as a Letter Carrier, a documentary film about her father, William P. Campbell.

== Personal life ==
Katrina del Mar is an out lesbian.

== Solo exhibitions ==
- 2017 "Feral Women & Filmed Portraits" Art on A, New York, NY.
- 2017 "Feral Women & Filmed Portraits" Leslie Lohman Museum – Prince Street Project Space New York, NY.
- 2016 "Hell No / Poster Child" Art Market Provincetown, Provincetown, MA
- 2016 "Feral Women & Filmed Portraits" Prince Street Project Space, New York, NY.
- 2015 "Feral Women" Twilight Gallery, Seattle, WA.
- 2014 "Summer Sang in Me" Strange Loop Gallery, New York NY
- 2014 "Summer Sang in Me" Art Market Provincetown, Provincetown, MA
- 2014 "Black Velvet White Leather" DeLuca Gallery, Provincetown, MA
- 2013 "GIRLS GIRLS GIRLS" Participant Inc. New York, NY.
- 2010 "Gangs of New York" Wrong Weather Gallery Porto, Portugal
- 2010 "Girl Gang Trilogy" Anthology Film Archives, New York NY
- 2009 "Katrina del Mar Retrospective" Red Rattler, Sydney Australia
- 2009 "Movie Mayhem" Cherry Bomb Comics, Auckland, NZ
- 2009 "Movie Mayhem" Gene Frankel Theatre, New York, NY
- 2007 "Movie Mayhem" Pioneer Theater, New York, NY
- 2003 "Ruff Trade" Miami Light Project, Miami, FL.
- 2001 "American Toughie" Intermedia Arts, Minneapolis, MN.
- 2000 "American Toughie and Gang Girls 2000" Photo /Film Installation. Spa, New York NY.
- 1999 "American Toughie" Photo and Film Installation. Clit Club, New York, NY.
- 1999 "American Toughie" Photo and Film Installation. Lust for Life, New York, NY.
- 1998 "Pseudo Kin" P.S. 122, New York, NY.
- 1998 "Chicks Trash and Rock & Roll" Photo Installation. Squeezebox, New York, NY.
- 1998 "Recent Photographs" Deepdale Gallery, New York NY.
- 1997 "Sweating Gasoline and Looking for a Match" Photo Installation, Clit Club, New York, NY.

== Group exhibitions ==
- 2016 Spring Break Art Show, Skylight at Moynihan Station, New York NY. "Cannibals" curated by Jo Shane & Maripol.
- 2015 "Trophy Art" Curated by Melissa McCaig-Welles AZArt New York, NY.
- 2014 "Push It" ArtNowNY, Joseph Gross Gallery, New York, NY
- 2014 (S)he is Still Her(e) Rivington Music, New York, NY
- 2013 "The Future is Now" Highline Loft, New York, NY
- 2013 "Social Change: Performance and Protest” The Schoolhouse Gallery, Provincetown, MA
- 2012 “On the Edge of Society: Deviant Performers at the End of the Millennium” Warehouse 9, Copenhagen
- 2011 “The Unseen” curated by Adela Leibowitz Torrance Museum of Art, Torrance California
- 2011 “Filmmakers Cooperative Summer Cinema Salon” Petit Versailles, New York, NY
- 2007 “If Everyone Had an Ocean/Nouvelles Vagues” film series, CAPC Museum, Bordeaux, France.
- 2007 "Womanizer" film series Deitch Projects, New York, NY.
- 2006 "The Process IV" BINZ 39, Zurich, Switzerland.
- 2004 "Mermaids" Barthelemy Gallery, Brooklyn, NY
- 2003 "Gen Art Miami" PT Studios, Soho Lounge & Oxygen, Miami, FL.
- 2002 "A Star is Born – Kembra Pfahler" American Fine Arts Co. New York, NY
- 2001 "Stimulata" University of Cardiff, Wales.
- 1999 "Illusion Delusion Denial" 450 Broadway Gallery, New York, NY.
- 1998 "Night of 100 Girls" Untitled warehouse space, New York, NY.
- 1996 "Tattoo" Studio Museum of Staten Island, New York, NY.
- 1996 "Picture This" CB's 313 Gallery, New York, NY.
- 1994 Untitled Group Show. Underground, West Palm Beach, FL.
- 1991 "Censorship in the Arts" University of Wisconsin, Madison.
- 1989 "Avantgarde-Arama" Performance Space 122, New York, NY.
- 1989 Untitled Program. State University of New York at Purchase.

== Selected awards and fellowships ==
- Top Ten Video of Click List MTV/Logo Networks broadcast to 26 million viewers worldwide: “I Got What I Came For” music video for GSX 2008
- Winner, Best Experimental Film, Planet Out Short Movie Awards 2006
- Change Inc./ The Rauschenberg Grant 2006
- Concordia Foundation Grant 2006
- Elephant Rock Foundation Grant 2005
- New York Foundation for the Arts (NYFA) Fellowship in Video 2004

== See also ==
- List of female film and television directors
- List of lesbian filmmakers
