= Go for Sisters =

- Directed by: John Sayles
- Written by: John Sayles
- Starring: Edward James Olmos; LisaGay Hamilton; Yolonda Ross
- Cinematography: Kathryn Westergaard
- Edited by: John Sayles
- Music by: Mason Daring
- Production companies: Anarchists' Convention; Olmos Productions; Go For Films
- Distributed by: Cinema Management Group
- Release date: March 11, 2013
- Running time: 123 minutes
- Country: United States
- Language: English

Go for Sisters is a 2013 American crime drama film written and directed by John Sayles. The title refers to the history of friendship between the two main characters: when they were in high school, the two African American women were so close they could "go for sisters". Sayles shot the film in 19 days, using 65 locations, for under a million dollars. The DVD was released in August 2014 and features a Director's Commentary in which Sayles talks at length about the art and craft of guerrilla film making.

== Plot ==
Bernice is a tough, no-nonsense parole officer whose son has gone missing. Fontayne is her old high school buddy whose brush with a possible parole violation lands her case on Bernice's desk. When Bernice discovers that her son is a possible murder suspect, she enlists Fontayne in a quest to rescue her son from what turns out to be Drug Lords and a Chinese Snakehead. Before they cross the border into Tijuana and Mexicali, Bernice also enlists the help of Freddy Suarez, a disgraced myopic ex-cop, whose nickname used to be "The Terminator".

As the story unfolds, Mahershala Ali, Isaiah Washington and Harold Perrineau each deliver brief but plot-twisting cameos.

== Cast ==
- LisaGay Hamilton as Bernice
- Edward James Olmos as Freddy Suarez
- Yolonda Ross as Fontayne
- Tessa Ferrer as Katrina
- Mahershala Ali as Dez
- Martha Higareda as Zeidy
- Harold Perrineau as Wiley
- Isaiah Washington as Vernell
- McKinley Belcher III as Rodney
- Elizabeth Sung as Mother Han
- Vanessa Martinez as Chula
- Manny Montana as Tenoch
- Héctor Elizondo as Jorge Moncal
- Don Patrick Harvey as Detective Mueller
- Brent Jennings as Dixon
- Jacob Vargas as Navajas
- Javier Calderón as Ramiro Chow
- Jessica Pimentel as La Mojada
- César Alejandro as Nestor
- Hilary Barraford as Cindy
- Sal Lopez as Morales
- Michael Piznarski as Vic
- Mary Portser as Margie
- Richard Coca as Rufo

== International distribution ==
The International distribution rights are being licensed by Cinema Management Group.

== Reception ==
On review aggregator website Rotten Tomatoes, the film has a rating of 74% based on 54 critics, with an average rating of 6.7/10. The site's consensus reads: "Meandering and diffuse, Go for Sisters proves a letdown for all but the most ardent John Sayles enthusiasts". On Metacritic, the film has a score of 59 out of 100 based on reviews from 24 critics, indicating "mixed or average" reviews.

Film critic Stephen Holden of The New York Times wrote in his review: "As a crime drama, Go for Sisters never gains traction. Like most of Mr. Sayles's films, Go for Sisters has a sociopolitical subtext — in this case, suggested by Fontayne: How is a parolee to avoid breaking the law by associating with drug dealers in an environment where they’re everywhere? She is trapped on a lower rung of the economic ladder."

Tim Grierson of Paste Magazine wrote "Go for Sisters is too slack in its storytelling to build up much suspense", while Jared Eisenstat of Film Comment wrote that "[the film] lopes along at a pace that at times verges on the pleasingly absurd: Bernice and Fontayne share a comical interlude with a cheerful, obtuse travel agent trying to sell them a trip to Baja; Suarez waxes on about his old rock 'n' roll band as he jams on an electric guitar; a car chase grinds to a halt when the trio stop at a gas station to refuel".

Writing for the Los Angeles Times, Sheri Linden commented "The actors' unforced chemistry defies the artifice. Olmos' delectable hamminess and Hamilton's unfussy performance convey volumes. Ross, guarded and resilient, is a revelation".

According to Ann Hornaday of The Washington Post, "Go For Sisters is worth the time if only to witness the terrific chemistry between Hamilton and Ross, the latter of whom delivers a break-through performance as a woman of uncommon, almost regal, composure, even as she struggles to stay on the righteous path".

Ignatiy Vishnevetsky of The A.V. Club called Go for Sisters "[an o]verlong, style-less, and dramatically undercooked", while Noel Murray of The Dissolve said "it feels like it's really gotten somewhere".

NPR's Tomas Hachard said "The deeper the plot takes us into a criminal underworld, the more Sayles grasps at plot points and appears plain bored".

Mick LaSalle of the San Francisco Chronicle have criticized the director for being "too talented, too authentic and too original to make a flat-out bad movie, but he flirts with it in Go for Sisters".

Bill Weber of Slant Magazine criticized the writing for the lead characters while respecting the actresses' performances, writing that "LisaGay Hamilton and Yolonda Ross persuasively embody modern urban feminine strength, but they're eventually stranded in a recycled road [film]". Marjorie Baumgarten of The Austin Chronicle added to the criticism "Go for Sisters goes down so many blind alleyways in its quest to find Bernice's son that the film sometimes feels more like an encyclopedia of social woes than a crime drama".

A similar distaste for the film was shared by David Fear of Time Out and Alan Scherstuhl of The Village Voice who also criticized the acting.

On the contrary, Rolling Stone's Peter Travers praised the acting, saying "With the help of Hamilton, Ross and Olmos, sublime actors who radiate grit and grace, Sayles has made Go for Sisters a movie that stays inside your head long after you see it".
