= Stranger Inside =

2001 television film by Cheryl Dunye

- Genre: Crime; Drama
- Written by: Catherine Crouch; Cheryl Dunye
- Directed by: Cheryl Dunye
- Starring: Yolonda Ross
- Music by: Mychael Danna; Andrew Lockington
- Country of origin: United States
- Original language: English

Production
- Producers: Effie Brown; Jim McKay; Michael Stipe
- Cinematography: Nancy Schreiber
- Editor: Cecily Rhett
- Running time: 97 minutes
- Production companies: C-Hundred Films Corporation; HBO Films; Stranger Baby Productions

Original release
- Network: HBO
- Release: June 23, 2001

Stranger Inside is a made-for-television crime drama film directed by Cheryl Dunye that premiered on cable television in 2001. The story primarily concerns African American women in prison. Michael Stipe, the lead singer of R.E.M., helped to produce it. In a 2004 issue of Feminist Studies, Dunye stated that she worked with actual female inmates to produce the script.

== Plot ==
Treasure Lee (Yolonda Ross) learns that her biological mother Brownie (Davenia McFadden) is incarcerated in an adult prison, so she purposely gets into trouble in order to be transferred from a juvenile facility to an adult women's facility in order to meet her. In the new prison, she reunites with an old friend Shadow (LaTanya Hagans). She meets new inmates, such as Leisha (Medusa), an aspiring rapper, and Doodle (Ella Joyce), a religious, homophobic woman who is involved with a male correctional officer.

When Treasure asks about Brownie, Leisha responds, "I'm about getting up out of here. I ain't about no Brownie." Later, Shadow points Brownie out to her on the basketball court. Brownie knocks a player down, injuring her, and demands that another person take her place. Treasure volunteers for the position. Back in the cells, Treasure approaches Brownie around her "prison family." She pulls out a photo of a woman and says to Brownie that she is her mother and her reason for being in prison. Brownie's "daughters" protest that the photograph is not of Brownie. Brownie asks the daughters to leave and yells at Treasure, stating it is her own fault she is in jail.

Treasure is playing cards with Leisha and Shadow when she begins flirting with an inmate named Sugar (Patrice Fisher). Kit (Rain Phoenix), Brownie's main daughter, chides the woman for not meeting her in the chapel for their usual sexual relations. A fight breaks out between Treasure and Kit that results in both being placed in solitary confinement. While confined, Brownie speaks through a wall telling Treasure that they should meet once she is released. Once back in the general population, Brownie meets with Treasure alone and states that she did not know about her because she was taken away at birth. She admits, "I failed you." Treasure cries on her shoulder.

As Treasure becomes a part of Brownie's prison family, Kit informs her that Brownie taught her how to survive in prison and demands that she sells drugs. Later, Brownie shoves a fork into Kit's thigh when Kit fails to bring in a certain amount of money from selling drugs. Meanwhile, Leisha is released from prison and Shadow admits that she wished she had never told Treasure about Brownie. Brownie tattoos the same ankh she has on Treasure's arm. Treasure suggests that she should be reassigned cells to be closer to the family and Brownie does nothing to make that happen. However, when Brownie eats food made by Treasure's new Asian cellmate (Emily Kuroda), she proposes that the new inmate should live near her.

Brownie mocks Kit when she sees Kit reading Nazi literature. Kit responds, "I am not jealous of you and Treasure because I know Brownie just cares about Brownie." Brownie then kicks her out of the prison family. In a later scene, a ranting Brownie grabs Treasure and comes close to maiming her with broken glass. Brownie approaches Treasure in the kitchen area where Treasure shows her obvious irritation with Brownie. Brownie tries to persuade Treasure that she needs to kill Kit, who now associates with a female neo-Nazi gang.

On the basketball court, Brownie slides a shank to Treasure. Treasure demands to play one-on-one basketball with Kit. Instead of playing, they immediately begin fighting. Treasure beats Kit badly but does not use the shank on her. Brownie pulls her to the side and demands that she kill Kit. As the two women leave their huddle, Kit approaches Brownie and puts a shank deep in her neck. All the inmates fall to the ground as correctional officers run out onto the court.

In a medical waiting area, Treasure sees Leisha, who is now in a wheelchair. Leisha, in a drowsy voice, states that the police caught her with drug paraphernalia again. When a medical worker calls Treasure's name, she dismisses her for not having matching blood. Treasure grabs the woman by the arm and demands to donate blood. A female correctional officer approaches the two and demands to read the file. The file reveals that Brownie is not Treasure's mother, but instead the woman who killed Treasure's mother.

The warden (Lee Garlington) has a meeting with Treasure in her office and says that she sympathizes with her. She offers to transfer Treasure if she will admit that Brownie and a male correctional officer have been working together to bring drugs to inmates.

At her new prison, a crew of inmates approach Treasure out of respect while she is outside smoking a cigarette. They ask her for her name and Treasure replies that her name is Brownie.

== Cast ==
- Yolonda Ross as Treasure Lee
- Davenia McFadden as "Brownie"
- Rain Phoenix as Kit
- Ella Joyce as "Doodle" Alderidge
- Conchata Ferrell as "Mama Cass"
- Lee Garlington as Warden Arnold
- LaTonya 'T' Hagans as "Shadow"
- Medusa as Leisha
- Marc Vann as Nelson
- Almayvonne Dixon as "Scar"
- Mary Mara as Tanya
- Karina Logue as Fran
- Emily Kuroda as Min

== Awards ==
In 2001, Stranger Inside won the Audience Awards at the Seattle Lesbian & Gay Film Festival, the San Francisco International Film Festival, L.A. Outfest and the Philadelphia Film Festival. It also won the award for Breakthrough Actor at the Gotham Awards (for Yolonda Ross) and the Special Jury Award at the Miami Gay and Lesbian Film Festival. In 2002, the film was nominated for several awards including a GLAAD Media Award, three Independent Spirit Awards and five Black Reel Awards. It won the Audience Award and Special mention at the Créteil International Women's Film Festival. For producing the film, Effie Brown won the Producer's Award at the 2003 Independent Spirit Awards.
