= List of lesbian filmmakers =

This is a list of lesbian filmmakers. The names listed include directors, producers, and screenwriters of feature films, television movies, documentaries and short films; and have received coverage or been recognized in reliable, authoritative media and academic sources.

== A–E ==
- Kasia Adamik (Poland)
- Jane Anderson (United States)
- Sini Anderson (United States)
- Chantal Akerman (Belgium)
- Dorothy Arzner (United States)
- Jamie Babbit (United States)
- Marina Rice Bader (United States)
- Christin Baker (United States)
- Janet Baus (United States)
- Sadie Benning (United States)
- Caroline Berler (United States)
- Katja Blichfeld (United States)
- Maureen Bradley (Canada)
- Netalie Braun (Israel)
- Katherine Brooks (United States)
- Nancy Cárdenas (Mexico)
- Dominique Cardona (Canada)
- Ruth Caudeli (Spain)
- Ilene Chaiken (United States)
- Lisa Cholodenko (United States)
- Zero Chou (Taiwan)
- Laurie Colbert (Canada)
- Janis Cole (Canada)
- Nicole Conn (United States)
- Catherine Corsini (France)
- Jeanne Crépeau (Canada)
- Catherine Crouch (United States)
- Holly Dale (Canada)
- Donna Deitch (United States)
- Katrina del Mar (United States)
- Virginie Despentes (France)
- Vicky Du (United States-Taiwan)
- Cheryl Dunye (Liberia)
- Clea DuVall (United States)
- Michelle Ehlen (United States)
- Esther Eng (United States)

== F–J ==
- Lynne Fernie (Canada)
- Jodie Foster (United States)
- Su Friedrich (United States)
- Maya Gallus (Canada)
- Nisha Ganatra (Canada)
- Dana Goldberg (Israel)
- Rosser Goodman (United States)
- Lisa Gornick (United Kingdom)
- Marleen Gorris (Netherlands)
- Catherine Gund (United States)
- Aurora Guerrero (United States)
- Sonali Gulati (United States)
- Jill Gutowitz (United States)
- Barbara Hammer (United States)
- Leslye Headland (United States)
- Alexandra Hedison (United States)
- Kate Herron (United States)
- Dianne Houston (United States)
- G. B. Jones (Canada)
- Ingrid Jungermann (United States)

== K–O ==
- Hayley Kiyoko (United States)
- Ana Kokkinos (Australia)
- Desiree Lim (Malaysia-China-Canada)
- Madeleine Lim (United States)
- Jennie Livingston (United States)
- Phyllida Lloyd (United Kingdom)
- Tucia Lyman (United States)
- Angelina Maccarone (Germany)
- Liz Marshall (Canada)
- Lucrecia Martel (Argentina)
- Sheila McLaughlin (United States)
- Fawzia Mirza (Canada)
- Cynthia Mort (United States)
- Dee Mosbacher (United States)
- Phyllis Nagy (United States)
- Brittani Nichols (United States)
- Tig Notaro (United States)
- Madeleine Olnek (United States)
- Jenni Olson (United States)
- Nneka Onuorah (United States)
- Ulrike Ottinger (Germany)
- Jan Oxenberg (United States)

== P–T ==
- Pratibha Parmar (United Kingdom)
- Stacie Passon (United States)
- Kimberly Peirce (United States)
- Cristina Perincioli (Switzerland)
- Justine Pimlott (Canada)
- Norma Bahia Pontes (Brazil)
- Léa Pool (Canada)
- Lourdes Portillo (United States-Mexico)
- Yvonne Rainer (United States)
- Dee Rees (United States)
- Yoruba Richen (United States)
- Marialy Rivas (Chile)
- Chloé Robichaud (Canada)
- Angela Robinson (United States)
- Patricia Rozema (Canada)
- Marja-Lewis Ryan (United States)
- Shamim Sarif (United Kingdom)
- Greta Schiller (United States)
- Céline Sciamma (France)
- Avigail Sperber (Israel)
- Ellen Spiro (United States)
- Monika Treut (Germany)
- Rose Troche (United States)
- Guinevere Turner (United States)

== U–Z ==
- Michal Vinik (Israel)
- Louise Wadley (Australia)
- Jane Wagner (United States)
- Lena Waithe (United States)
- Andrea Weiss (United States)
- Aerlyn Weissman (United States-Canada)
- Yvonne Welbon (United States)
- Tucky Williams (United States)
- Alice Wu (United States)
- Monica Zanetti (Australia)

== See also ==
- List of female film and television directors
- List of LGBT-related films directed by women
- List of gay, lesbian or bisexual people
- New Queer Cinema
- Sexuality and gender identity-based cultures
