= Ira Jeffries =

Ira L. Jeffries (20 March 1932–16 July 2010) was an American playwright, journalist, and actress. In 1985, she won the Audelco Theatre Award for excellence in playwriting. She received a Bachelor of Arts in communications at City College of New York in 1987. In 1992, she founded the Kaleidoscope Theater Company for issues relevant to the LGBT community. She produced plays at the company in association with WOW Café. She wrote 21 one-act and full-length plays. She both acted in The Watermelon Woman, a 1996 black lesbian romcom, and assisted in the production. She wrote for publications such as B & G Magazine, The New Harlem Magazine, New York Amsterdam News, Womanews and Sappho's Isle. Some of her papers are housed at the New York Public Library, and others in the Schomburg Center for Research in Black Culture's In the Life Archive.
