= Yolonda Ross =

American actress, writer and director

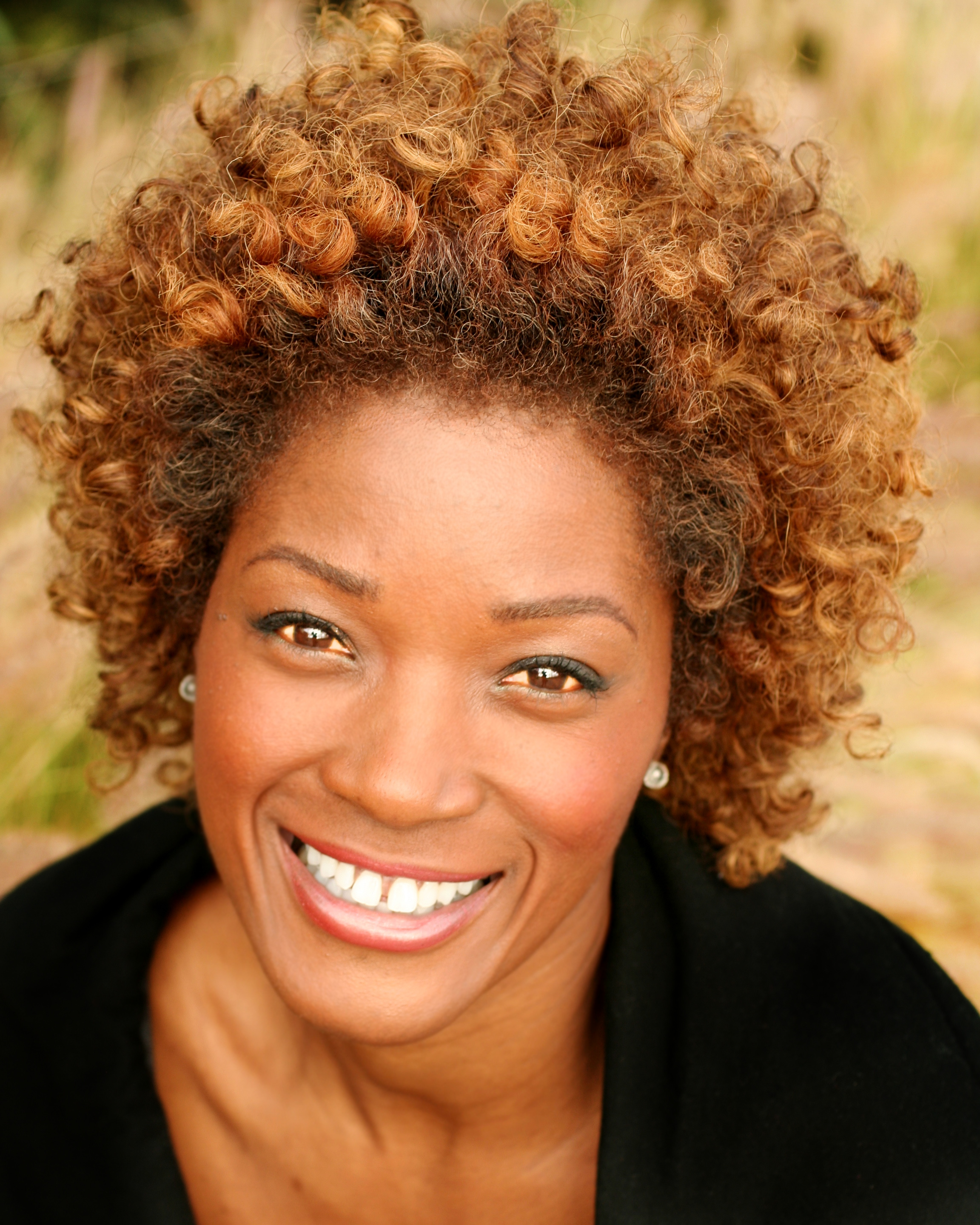
- Ross in 2012
- Born: Omaha, Nebraska, US
- Occupations: Actress, writer, director
- Years active: 1997–present

Yolonda Ross is an American actress, writer and director.

== Life and career ==
Ross was born and raised in Omaha, Nebraska. She began her acting career in New York, appearing in the episodes of television series New York Undercover and Third Watch. Before landing the leading role in the independent drama film, Stranger Inside (2001). The movie produced by HBO, first premiered on television, but Ross was nominated for an Independent Spirit Award for Best Debut Performance. She later had supporting roles in a number of independent productions and guest-starred on Law & Order and Law & Order: Criminal Intent, and in 2011 had a recurring role on HBO's Treme.

Ross co-starred alongside LisaGay Hamilton in the critically acclaimed 2013 independent drama film, Go for Sisters. She received Independent Spirit Award for Best Supporting Female nomination for her performance in film. She later was cast opposite Viola Davis in Lila & Eve. In 2015, Ross played Robyn Crawford, the friend, assistant, and reported girlfriend of Whitney Houston, in the Lifetime movie, Whitney directed by Angela Bassett.

In 2017, Ross had a recurring role opposite Viola Davis in the ABC legal thriller How to Get Away with Murder. The following year she was cast in a series regular role in the Showtime drama series, The Chi.

== Filmography ==
=== Film ===
| Year | Title | Role | Notes |
|---|---|---|---|
| 2001 | Stranger Inside | Treasure | TV movie |
| 2002 | Antwone Fisher | Nadine | |
| 2003 | The United States of Leland | Miranda | |
| 2003 | The Taste of Dirt | Mommy | Short |
| 2003 | Allergic to Nuts | Lavita | Short |
| 2004 | Mind the Gap | Deniese | |
| 2004 | Dense | Stacey | TV movie |
| 2004 | Thanksgiving | Yolonda | Short |
| 2005 | Dani and Alice | Alice | Short |
| 2005 | Hung | Roxy | Short |
| 2006 | Shortbus | Faustus | |
| 2006 | Slippery Slope | Ginger | |
| 2007 | Gardener of Eden | Jasmine | |
| 2007 | I'm Not There. | Angela Reeves | |
| 2008 | Choke | Teacher | |
| 2008 | Happy Birthday | Madeleine | Short |
| 2009 | Whatever Works | Boy's Mother | |
| 2009 | The Greims | Gabrielle | Short |
| 2009 | The Farm | Wade Dawson | TV movie |
| 2011 | Yelling to the Sky | Lorene O'Hara | |
| 2012 | Four | Mrs. Phillips | |
| 2012 | Breaking Night | Girl | Short |
| 2013 | Go for Sisters | Fontayne | |
| 2013 | Phil Spector | Kelly | TV movie |
| 2013 | All Roads Lead | Samantha Hollitt | |
| 2014 | Afronauts | Auntie Sunday | Short |
| 2014 | Just the Three of Us | Ivy | Short |
| 2014 | Of Darkness and Light | Ms. Littlefield | Short |
| 2015 | Whitney | Robyn Crawford | TV movie |
| 2015 | Lila & Eve | Patrice | |
| 2015 | Meadowland | Melanie | |
| 2015 | The Youth | Ishan | Short |
| 2015 | Kiss Me, Kill Me | Detective Annette Riley | |
| 2016 | Little Men | Arkadina | |
| 2016 | Woman Outside | - | Short |
| 2016 | Split | Alice | |
| 2016 | Walk for Me | Andrea | Short |
| 2016 | The Bad Batch | Maria | |
| 2016 | How to Disappear Completely | Cassandra | Short |
| 2017 | The Creed | Khadijah | Short |
| 2018 | O.G. | Beecher's Sister | |
| 2018 | She Got Game | Mom | Short |
| 2018 | Out of Blue | Janey Mac | |
| 2019 | Bull | Sheila | |
| 2021 | Desmond's Not Here Anymore | Abigail | Short |
| 2022 | The Bond | Cece | Short |
| 2024 | Absolution | Woman | |
| TBA | Samo Lives | | Post-production |

=== Television ===
| Year | Title | Role | Notes |
|---|---|---|---|
| 1997 | New York Undercover | Jackie | Episode: "The Solomon Papers" |
| 2000 | Third Watch | Patricia Ryder | Episode: "Nature or Nurture?" |
| 2001 | 24 | Jessie Hampton | Episode: "3:00 a.m.-4:00 a.m." |
| 2005 | Third Watch | Lynette | Episode: "Too Little, Too Late" |
| 2005 | Law & Order: Criminal Intent | Regina Alcarese | Episode: "Shibboleth" |
| 2007 | Law & Order: Criminal Intent | Patricia | Episode: "Flipped" |
| 2008 | New Amsterdam | Lily Mae Brown | Episode: "Golden Boy" |
| 2009 | The Unit | Nora | Episode: "Whiplash" |
| 2010 | Law & Order | P.O. Liz Canto | Episode: "Four Cops Shot" |
| 2010 | Lie to Me | Simone Askew | Episode: "Headlock" |
| 2011 | Treme | Dana Lyndsey | Recurring cast: season 2 |
| 2016 | The Get Down | Ms. Green | Recurring cast: season 1 |
| 2017 | How to Get Away with Murder | Claudia | Recurring cast: Season 3-4 |
| 2018 | Bull | Judge Knight | Episode: "Absolution" |
| 2018 | Chicago P.D. | Sarah Washington | Episode: "Black and Blue" |
| 2018–2026 | The Chi | Jada Washington | Main cast |
| 2022 | Terror Lake Drive | Shana | Main cast: season 2 |
| 2022 | American Gigolo | Lizzy | Recurring cast |

== Awards and nominations ==
| Work | Year | Awards | Category | Results |
|---|---|---|---|---|
| Stranger Inside | 2001 | Gotham Independent Film Awards | Breakthrough Actor | Won |
| Stranger Inside | 2002 | Black Reel Awards | Network/Cable - Best Actress | Nominated |
| Stranger Inside | 2002 | Independent Spirit Awards | Best Debut Performance | Nominated |
| Go for Sisters | 2014 | Independent Spirit Awards | Best Supporting Female | Nominated |
