= Frameline Film Festival =

LGBTQ film festival in California, USA

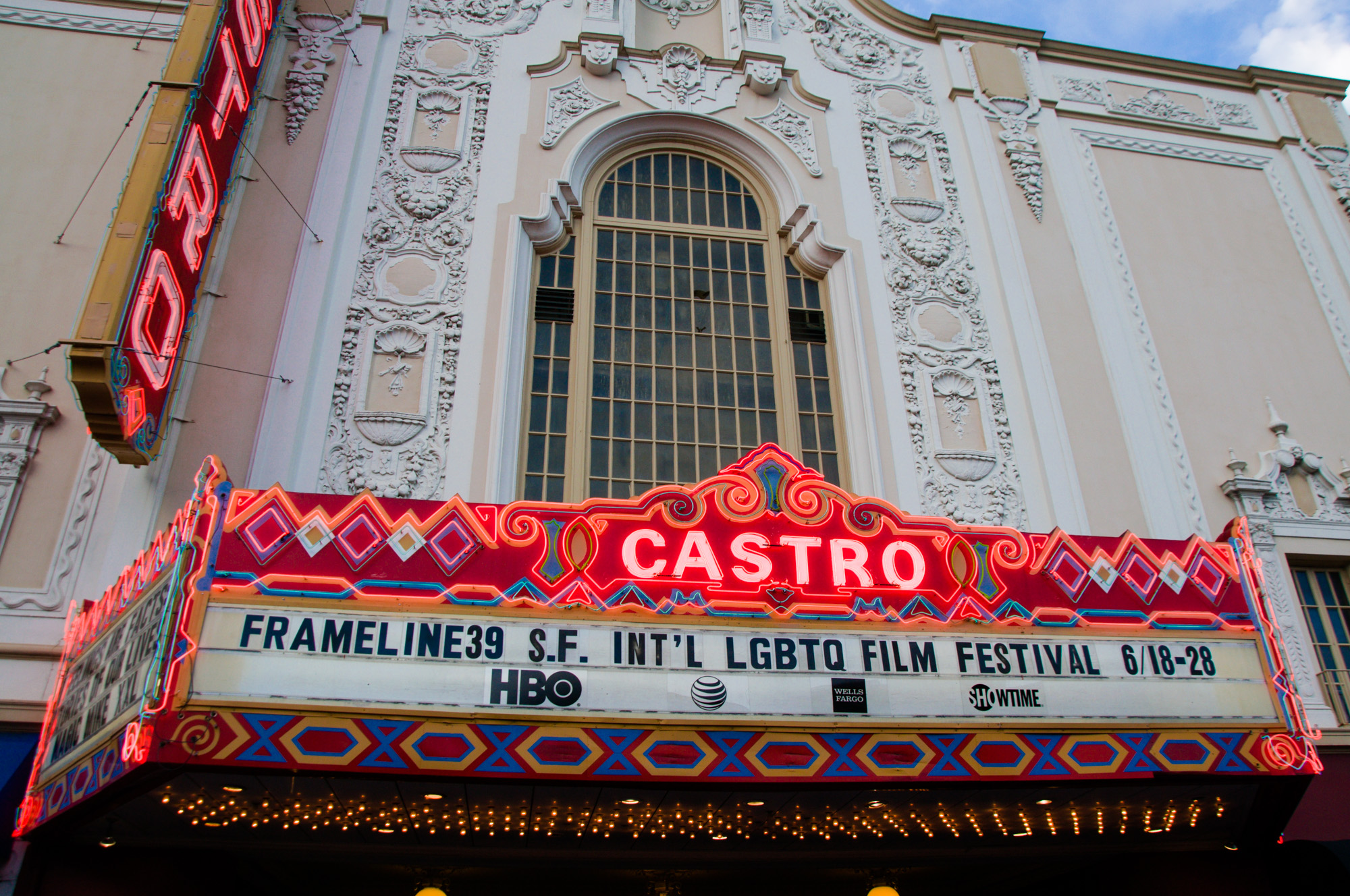
- Castro Theatre during Frameline 39 in June 2015
- Location: San Francisco and Oakland, California, USA
- Founded: 1977
- Most recent: June 18–28, 2025
- Awards: Frameline Award, Out in the Silence Award, audience and juried awards
- Hosted by: Frameline
- Website: frameline.org

The Frameline Film Festival (also known as San Francisco International LGBTQ+ Film Festival) is an annual event that screens and celebrates films by and about LGBTQ people, established in 1976. The festival is organized by Frameline, a nonprofit media arts organization whose mission statement is "to change the world through the power of queer cinema". Since 2024 the executive director of Frameline has been Allegra Madsen, formerly director of programming.

It is the oldest LGBTQ+ film festival in the world, (Note: Contrary to local legend the 1977 event in San Francisco was not the world's first gay film festival. That title goes to a "Festival of Gay Films" staged in Australia by the Sydney Filmmaker's Co-op in June 1976. However, that was a one-time event. The Australian Film Institute founded the "Gay and Lesbian Film Festival" that became the direct precursor to today's Mardi Gras Sydney Gay Film Festival two years later, in 1978. Frameline, started in 1977, is therefore the oldest continuous annual gay film festival in the world.) and with annual attendance ranging from 60,000 to 80,000, the largest LGBTQ+ film exhibition event. It is also the most well-attended LGBTQ+ arts event in the San Francisco Bay Area.

The festival is held over eleven days in late June (reduced in 2004 from eighteen), with the closing night coinciding with San Francisco's annual Gay Pride Day, which takes place on the last Sunday of the month. The Castro Theatre has traditionally been the main venue.

== History ==
The first festival was organized in 1976 and took place in 1977 at the Gay Community Center at 32 Page Street in San Francisco, under the names Persistence of Vision and the Gay Film Festival of Super-8 Films. It comprised experimental films, screened using a rented projector on a bedsheet pinned to a board. In 1982, the organizers incorporated under the name Frameline, and the festival became Frameline: San Francisco International Lesbian and Gay Film Festival. Michael Lumpkin joined the organization at that time; he became a full-time employee in 1986, molded it into a professional film festival, and retired in 2008 after many years as director. A film distribution arm was founded in 1982. In 1988, the festival received its first grant from the National Endowment for the Arts, but this funding was withdrawn in the 1990s under pressure from Republicans in Congress.

Because of the COVID-19 pandemic, a small virtual event was held in June and the 2020 Frameline was delayed to September and was online except for a drive-in screening. Frameline 45, in 2021, was a hybrid online and in-person event. In 2022, Frameline returned to in-person screenings but offered a home streaming option.

Frameline initially grew out of the gay liberation movement and was focused on gay men. "Lesbian" was added to the festival's name in 1982, but a riot led by lesbians at a screening of Midi Onodera's Ten Cents a Dance: Parallax at the Roxie Theater during the 1986 festival led the organization to work toward greater diversity in programming and create a fund to assist women and people of color in completing film projects. The festival was widely referred to as the San Francisco International Lesbian and Gay Film Festival until 2005, when it adopted the name San Francisco International LGBT Film Festival; it added a Q in 2015, but since 2004 the organization has referred to individual festivals simply as "Frameline" with an appended number. Objections by the transgender community led Frameline to pull Catherine Crouch's The Gendercator from the 2007 festival, leading to accusations of censorship from lesbians.

In 2020 Frameline was a partner, alongside Outfest Los Angeles, the New York Lesbian, Gay, Bisexual, & Transgender Film Festival and the Inside Out Film and Video Festival, in launching the North American Queer Festival Alliance, an initiative to further publicize and promote LGBT film. Films screened at the Frameline Film Festival have been donated to the Hormel Center at the San Francisco Public Library. An initial donation was made in 2005, and the library partnered with the Bay Area Video Coalition for conservation of video recordings.

== Awards ==
The festival's annual awards include the Frameline Award given to an individual who has played a key role in the history of LGBTQ+ cinema, the Out in the Silence Award for "an outstanding film project that highlights brave acts of visibility", audience awards for Best Feature, Best Documentary, Best Episodic, and Best Short, and juried awards for First Feature and Outstanding Documentary.

=== Frameline Award honorees ===
1986 Vito Russo
1987 Alexandra von Grote
1988 Divine
1989 Cinevista / Promovision
1990 Robert Epstein
1991 Elfi Mikesch
1992 Marlon Riggs
1993 Pratibha Parmar
1994 Christine Vachon
1995 Marcus Hu
1996 Peter Adair
1997 Channel Four Television
1998 Dolly Hall
1999 Stanley Kwan
2000 Barbara Hammer
2001 The Festival’s Founders
2002 Isaac Julien
2003 Fenton Bailey & Randy Barbato
2004 Rose Troche
2005 Gregg Araki
2006 François Ozon
2007 Andrea Sperling
2008 Michael Lumpkin
2009 George Kuchar & Mike Kuchar
2010 Wolfe Video
2011 Margaret Cho
2012 B. Ruby Rich
2013 Jamie Babbit
2014 George Takei
2015 Jeffrey Schwarz
2016 Bob Hawk
2017 Alan Cumming
2018 Debra Chasnoff
2019 Rodney Evans

== Notable people ==
- Mark Finch
- Jenni Olson

== See also ==
- Cinema of the United States
- List of LGBT film festivals
