= Catherine Crouch =

American film director

- Born: 13 August 1960 (age 65); Fort Benning, Georgia, United States
- Occupations: Film director, screenwriter

Catherine Crouch is an American film director, screenwriter, producer, cinematographer, and actor. She has been active in independent film-making for over two decades. Most of her work explores gender, race, and class in lesbian and queer lives. She is known for Stranger Inside (2001), Stray Dogs (2002), and The Gendercator (2007).

== The Gendercator controversy ==
The Gendercator is a 2007 short film described as "a satirical take on surgical body modification and gender. The story uses the 'Rip Van Winkle' model to extrapolate from the feminist 1970s to a frightening 2048 where politics and technology have conspired to mandate two gender 'choices': Macho male or Barbie babe. In this dystopian future, those whose gender presentation does not comply will be GENDERCATED." It is set in a future dystopic world where gender non-conformance is intolerable and genderqueerness is resolved with sex-change operations that align gender attributes with outer appearance; wherein masculinity is conformed with a male body and femininity with a female body.

It was scheduled to screen in the OUTer Limits section of the 2007 Frameline Film Festival, along with other futuristic and experimental films, but it was pulled from the program after several members and supporters of the transgender community criticized it as "transphobic" and took issue with its being included in the festival. Frameline yielded to an online petition published by the website Left on SF that described The Gendercator as a "hateful movie". Protesters complained about the use of the word "tranny" in the dialogue; they also objected to the director's statement in which Crouch spoke against body modification as a solution for all gender dissonance.

Crouch was invited to screen her film in San Francisco in the fall of 2007 by Ondine Kilker, co-chair of community initiative Center Women Present (CWP). In a 2008 interview for Sinister Wisdom, Crouch stated that her film spoke to an intracommunity queer issue where an over-reliance on gender norms was fast becoming a popular and too narrow way to interpret the vast diversity of queer gender and sex expressions.

The Gendercator is the first film pulled by Frameline from its festival due to controversy. Crouch maintains that gender pluralism was the core gender message, and that she was representing a lesbian and queer perspective about binary gender roles rather than a phobic response to the lived experiences of transgender and transsexual people. Aside from The Gendercator, other films by Crouch have been shown at the Frameline Film Festival.

== Filmography ==
=== Director ===
- Osco Bag (1996)
- Vanilla Lament - 16mm - (1997)
- One Small Step - 16mm - (1999)
- A Christmas Sacrifice (1999)
- Stray Dogs (2001). Stray Dogs is Crouch's first feature-length film. IMDB describes the film as: "A mother must choose between love and devotion to her sons and unborn child or staying with her sexy, maniacal husband and his patriarchal sister, who respectively fulfill her physical and emotional needs." The film starred Guinevere Turner.
- Pretty Ladies - super 8mm - (2002)
- The Gendercator - super 8mm, miniDV - (2007)
- Buttery Top - super 8mm, miniDV - (2009)
- A Pirate in Alphabet City - HD Animation - (2010)

=== Screenplays ===
- Slaves of the Saints (2011) Directed by Kelly Hayes; written by Catherine Crouch. "Slaves of the Saint is an ethnographic documentary about Afro-Brazilian religions, which combine elements of African religions, folk Catholicism, and Spiritualism...Eschewing an all-knowing narrator in favor of participants' own testimony--and featuring an interview with a bawdy pomba gira--Slaves of the Saint shows the importance of these spirits in the lives of their devotees and offers an inside account of popular but often maligned spiritual practices."
- The Taste of Dirt (2003) Directed by Yvonne Welbon; written by Catherine Crouch. The Taste of Dirt "depicts a young African American girl who struggles with the role race plays in her relationships"
- Stranger Inside (2001) Directed by Cheryl Dunye; Screenplay by Cheryl Dunye and Catherine Crouch; "A mother daughter reunion set in the harsh reality of a women's correctional facility" "In 2001, Stranger Inside won the Audience Awards at the Seattle Lesbian & Gay Film Festival, the San Francisco International Film Festival, L.A. Outfest and the Philadelphia Film Festival. It also won the Breakthrough Award at the Gotham Awards (for Yolonda Ross) and the Special Jury Award at the Miami Gay and Lesbian Film Festival. In 2002, the film was nominated for several awards including a GLAAD Media Award, three Independent Spirit Awards and five Black Reel Awards. It won the Audience Award and Special mention at the Créteil International Women's Film Festival. For producing the film, Effie Brown won the Producer's Award at the 2003 Independent Spirit Awards."

=== Cinematography and Sound ===
- Living with Pride: Ruth Ellis @ 100 (1999) Director & Producer: Yvonne Welbon; Camera & Sound: Catherine Crouch "Winner of 10 Best Documentary Awards, "Living With Pride: Ruth Ellis @ 100" is a one-hour documentary about the life and times of Ruth Ellis. Born July 23, 1899, in Springfield, Illinois, she was thought to be the oldest "out" African American lesbian known. In addition to exploring her rich past, the film offers a rare opportunity to experience a century of our history as lived by one inspiring woman. By example, Ruth Ellis shows us what is possible and what can be realized, if one not only lives long and ages well but also lives with pride."
- "The film was screened at film festivals worldwide, and won the Audience Award for Best Documentary at the San Francisco International Gay and Lesbian Film Festival in 1999."

=== Acting ===
- Ms. Stevens Hears the Mermaids Singing (2004) - Supporting, Dorthea Miller (directed by Linda Thornbug)
- The Undergrad (2003) - Featured, Revered Crouch (written and directed by Mahoney)
- Pretty Ladies (2002) - Supporting, The Priestess
- Vanilla Lament (1997)

== See also ==
- List of female film and television directors
- List of lesbian filmmakers
- List of LGBT-related films directed by women
