= Haifa International Film Festival =

Israeli film festival

- Location: Haifa, Israel
- Founded: 1983; 43 years ago
- Awards: Golden Anchor, Carmel Award, Lifetime Achievement Award
- Film titles: Approximately 27 features and documentaries (plus shorts and animations)
- Hosted by: Ethos – The Haifa Municipality Art, Culture and Sports Association Company
- Website: www.haifaff.co.il/eng

The Haifa International Film Festival (Hebrew: פסטיבל הסרטים הבינלאומי חיפה) is an annual film festival that takes place every autumn (between late September and late October), during the week-long holiday of Sukkot, in Haifa, Israel.

== History ==
The festival was inaugurated in 1983 and was the first of its kind in Israel. Over the years, it has become the country's major cinematic event.

The Haifa International Film Festival attracts a wide audience of film-goers and media professionals from Israel and abroad. Throughout the week, special screenings are held of c.170 new films. Apart from movies screened around the clock at seven theaters, the festival features open-air screenings. Film categories include feature films, documentaries, animation, short films, retrospectives and tributes.

== Awards ==
=== 2026: 42nd festival ===
On the opening day, 26 September, Avi Nesher received the Lifetime Achievement Award and his new film, Our Loves was screened.

=== 2025: 41st festival ===
The following awards were announced on October 12, 2025:

- Israeli Cinema Awards
  - Best Film: A Burning Man, directed by Eyal Halfon
  - Jury award for Best Narrative Feature: Of Dogs and Men, directed by Dani Rosenberg, and Some Notes on the Current Situation, directed by Eran Kolirin
  - Jury award for Best Documentary Film: Proud Jewish Boy, directed by Isri Halpern
  - Best debut film: Fadia, directed by Shady Srour
  - Best Screenplay Award for Narrative Feature: Shady Srour and Laurel Hunter for Fadia
  - Best Research for Documentary Film: Ilan Sheizaf, Dana Wolfe, and Ali Aadi UNraveling UNRWA
  - Best Acting Award in a Narrative Feature: Shai Avivi in A Burning Man
- Best Artistic Achievement Award: Einat Glazer-Zarhin for her editing of No Cakes from the Homefront

=== 2024: 40th festival ===
The following awards were announced on January 9, 2025:

- Israeli Cinema Awards
  - Real Estate: A Love Story, written and directed by Anat Maltz:
    - Best Film
    - Best Screenplay Award for a Narrative Feature for Anat Maltz
  - Jury award for Best Narrative Feature: Halisa, written and directed by Sophie Artus
  - Best Documentary Film: Kafka’s Last Trial, directed by Eliran Peled
  - Best Debut Film: My Missing Screw, directed by Nitsan Tal
  - Best Research for Documentary Film: Hagit Ben-Yaakov, Shani Bar David, and Efrat Shalom Danon for Abortion in the Holy Land
  - Best Acting Award in a Narrative Feature: Hili Yosef-Zada for the role of Shahar in Girls Like Us
- Best Artistic Achievement Award: cinematographer Saar Mizrahi and art director Barak Vazan for Cabaret Total
- The Israeli Short Film Competition
  - Best Independent Film (two films)
    - Aba, directed by Claudio Steinberg
    - The Event Horizon, directed by Shira Geffen
- Carmel – The International Cinema Competition
  - Best Film Award: The Brutalist, directed by Brady Corbet
  - Honorable Mention: The Seed of the Sacred Fig, directed by Mohammad Rasoulof

== See also ==
- Culture of Israel
- Cinema of Israel
